= Electoral results for the Higinbotham Province =

Victoria, Australia, district election results

This is a list of electoral results for the Higinbotham Province in Victorian state elections.

== Members for Higinbotham Province ==
Member 1	Party	Year		
James Kennedy	United Australia	1937	Member 2	Party
James Kennedy	United Australia	1940	James Disney	United Australia
James Kennedy	United Australia	1943	James Disney	United Australia
James Kennedy	Liberal	1945	James Disney	Liberal
James Kennedy	Liberal	1946	Arthur Warner	Liberal
James Kennedy	Liberal and Country	1949	Arthur Warner	Liberal and Country
James Kennedy	Liberal and Country	1949	Arthur Warner	Liberal and Country
James Kennedy	Liberal and Country	1952	Arthur Warner	Liberal and Country
Lindsay Thompson	Liberal and Country	1954	Arthur Warner	Liberal and Country
Lindsay Thompson	Liberal and Country	1955	Arthur Warner	Liberal and Country
Lindsay Thompson	Liberal and Country	1958	Arthur Warner	Liberal and Country
Lindsay Thompson	Liberal and Country	1961	Arthur Warner	Liberal and Country
Lindsay Thompson	Liberal and Country	1964	Baron Snider	Liberal and Country
Lindsay Thompson	Liberal	1965	Baron Snider	Liberal
Lindsay Thompson	Liberal	1967	Murray Hamilton	Liberal
William Fry	Liberal	1967	Murray Hamilton	Liberal
William Fry	Liberal	1970	Murray Hamilton	Liberal
William Fry	Liberal	1973	Murray Hamilton	Liberal
William Fry	Liberal	1976	Murray Hamilton	Liberal
Robert Lawson	Liberal	1979	Murray Hamilton	Liberal
Robert Lawson	Liberal	1982	Geoffrey Connard	Liberal
Robert Lawson	Liberal	1985	Geoffrey Connard	Liberal
Robert Lawson	Liberal	1988	Geoffrey Connard	Liberal
Chris Strong	Liberal	1992	Geoffrey Connard	Liberal
Chris Strong	Liberal	1996	John Ross	Liberal
Chris Strong	Liberal	1999	John Ross	Liberal
Chris Strong	Liberal	2002	Noel Pullen	Labor

== Election results ==
=== Elections in the 2000s ===
2002 Victorian state election: Higinbotham Province
Party	Candidate	Votes	%	±%
Liberal	Michael Heffernan	60,580	45.7	−10.1
Labor	Noel Pullen	52,445	39.6	+36.9
Greens	Tony McDermott	16,451	12.4	+12.4
Democrats	Derek Wilson	2,952	2.2	−39.1
Total formal votes		132,428	97.2	+0.3
Informal votes		3,845	2.8	−0.3
Turnout		136,273	92.7	
Two-party-preferred result
Labor	Noel Pullen	66,711	50.4	+6.5
Liberal	Michael Heffernan	65,717	49.6	−6.5
Labor gain from Liberal		Swing	+6.5	

=== Elections in the 1990s ===
1999 Victorian state election: Higinbotham Province
Party	Candidate	Votes	%	±%
Liberal	Chris Strong	69,024	56.4	−0.4
Democrats	Craig Tucker	53,414	43.6	+35.8
Total formal votes		122,438	96.9	−1.0
Informal votes		3,892	3.1	+1.0
Turnout		126,330	92.8	
Liberal hold		Swing	−4.4	

1996 Victorian state election: Higinbotham Province
Party	Candidate	Votes	%	±%
Liberal	John Ross	69,727	56.7	−5.3
Labor	Ken Wilson	42,032	34.2	+3.2
Democrats	Diane Barry	9,655	7.9	+7.9
Democratic Labor	Gail King	1,507	1.2	−1.5
Total formal votes		122,921	98.0	+1.6
Informal votes		2,549	2.0	−1.6
Turnout		125,470	94.2	
Two-party-preferred result
Liberal	John Ross	74,580	60.8	−3.9
Labor	Ken Wilson	48,149	39.2	+3.9
Liberal hold		Swing	−3.9	

1992 Victorian state election: Higinbotham Province
Party	Candidate	Votes	%	±%
Liberal	Chris Strong	74,382	62.0	+7.2
Labor	Thomas Hickie	37,182	31.0	−13.5
Natural Law	Edward Havard	5,088	4.2	+4.2
Democratic Labor	Gail de Rozario	3,288	2.7	+2.7
Total formal votes		119,940	96.4	−0.1
Informal votes		4,488	3.6	+0.1
Turnout		124,428	94.7	
Two-party-preferred result
Liberal	Chris Strong	77,462	64.7	+9.5
Labor	Thomas Hickie	42,345	35.3	−9.5
Liberal hold		Swing	+9.5	

=== Elections in the 1980s ===
1988 Victorian state election: Higinbotham Province
Party	Candidate	Votes	%	±%
Liberal	Geoffrey Connard	58,905	57.1	+4.7
Labor	Kevin McCosh	44,283	42.9	+1.7
Total formal votes		103,188	96.3	−0.9
Informal votes		4,011	3.7	+0.9
Turnout		107,199	91.6	−0.8
Liberal hold		Swing	+1.5	

1985 Victorian state election: Higinbotham Province
Party	Candidate	Votes	%	±%
Liberal	Robert Lawson	57,733	52.4	
Labor	Denis Oakley	45,329	41.2	
Democrats	Anton Hermann	7,039	6.4	
Total formal votes		110,101	97.3	
Informal votes		3,113	2.7	
Turnout		113,214	92.4	
Two-party-preferred result
Liberal	Robert Lawson	61,216	55.6	+2.3
Labor	Denis Oakley	48,885	44.4	−2.3
Liberal hold		Swing	+2.3	

1982 Victorian state election: Higinbotham Province
Party	Candidate	Votes	%	±%
Liberal	Geoffrey Connard	49,967	49.2	−5.5
Labor	Geoffrey Fleming	43,674	43.0	−2.3
Democrats	Barry Preston	7,821	7.7	+7.7
Total formal votes		101,462	97.6	+0.4
Informal votes		2,454	2.4	−0.4
Turnout		103,916	94.5	+1.1
Two-party-preferred result
Liberal	Geoffrey Connard	53,012	52.3	−2.4
Labor	Geoffrey Fleming	48,450	47.7	+2.4
Liberal hold		Swing	−2.4	

=== Elections in the 1970s ===
1979 Victorian state election: Higinbotham Province
Party	Candidate	Votes	%	±%
Liberal	Robert Lawson	55,703	54.7	−7.3
Labor	Geoffrey Fleming	46,031	45.3	+7.3
Total formal votes		101,734	97.2	−0.4
Informal votes		2,961	2.8	+0.4
Turnout		104,695	93.4	+0.5
Liberal hold		Swing	−7.3	

1976 Victorian state election: Higinbotham Province
Party	Candidate	Votes	%	±%
Liberal	Murray Hamilton	65,031	63.1	
Labor	Russell Shearn	39,696	37.9	
Total formal votes		104,727	97.6	
Informal votes		2,566	2.4	
Turnout		107,293	92.9	
Liberal hold		Swing		

1973 Victorian state election: Higinbotham Province
Party	Candidate	Votes	%	±%
Liberal	William Fry	68,273	55.6	+8.1
Labor	Henry Woodley	44,792	36.5	−3.2
Democratic Labor	Frederick Skinner	9,631	7.9	−4.9
Total formal votes		122,696	97.2	+0.2
Informal votes		3,524	2.8	−0.2
Turnout		126,220	93.6	−0.9
Two-party-preferred result
Liberal	William Fry		62.7	+3.6
Labor	Henry Woodley		37.3	−3.6
Liberal hold		Swing	+3.6	

- Two party preferred vote was estimated.

1970 Victorian state election: Higinbotham Province
Party	Candidate	Votes	%	±%
Liberal	Murray Hamilton	53,258	47.5	−5.7
Labor	Anthony Balmer	44,599	39.7	+6.3
Democratic Labor	Frederick Skinner	14,378	12.8	−0.6
Total formal votes		112,235	97.0	−0.2
Informal votes		3,479	3.0	+0.2
Turnout		115,714	94.5	+0.5
Two-party-preferred result
Liberal	Murray Hamilton	66,302	59.1	−6.2
Labor	Anthony Balmer	45,933	40.9	+6.2
Liberal hold		Swing	−6.2	

=== Elections in the 1960s ===
1967 Victorian state election: Higinbotham Province
Party	Candidate	Votes	%	±%
Liberal	William Fry	57,385	53.2	
Labor	Anthony Scarcella	36,071	33.4	
Democratic Labor	Ian Radnell	14,395	13.4	
Total formal votes		107,851	97.2	
Informal votes		3,119	2.8	
Turnout		110,970	94.0	
Two-party-preferred result
Liberal	William Fry		65.3	
Labor	Anthony Scarcella		34.7	
Liberal hold		Swing		

1967 Higinbotham Province state by-election
Party	Candidate	Votes	%	±%
Liberal and Country	Murray Hamilton	61,179	59.2	+6.2
Labor	Edward Benjamin	39,254	38.0	+3.9
Independent	Leslie Payne	2,946	2.9	+2.9
Total formal votes		103,379	98.4	+0.8
Informal votes		1,645	1.6	−0.8
Turnout		105,024	82.6	−11.0
Liberal and Country hold		Swing	N/A	

- This by-election was caused by the death of Baron Snider. Preferences were not distributed.

1964 Victorian state election: Higinbotham Province
Party	Candidate	Votes	%	±%
Liberal and Country	Baron Snider	59,791	53.0	+0.9
Labor	Colin Campbell	38,474	34.1	+4.0
Democratic Labor	Francis Sampson	14,635	13.0	−4.9
Total formal votes		112,900	97.6	+0.1
Informal votes		2,752	2.4	−0.1
Turnout		115,652	93.6	−0.5
Two-party-preferred result
Liberal and Country	Baron Snider		64.7	−1.7
Labor	Colin Campbell		35.3	+1.7
Liberal and Country hold		Swing	−1.7	

- Two party preferred vote was estimated.

1961 Victorian state election: Higinbotham Province
Party	Candidate	Votes	%	±%
Liberal and Country	Lindsay Thompson	57,948	52.1	−7.2
Labor	Eric Perryman	33,471	30.1	−4.8
Democratic Labor	Henry Moore	19,871	17.9	+17.9
Total formal votes		111,290	97.5	−0.7
Informal votes		2,885	2.5	+0.7
Turnout		114,175	94.1	+2.1
Two-party-preferred result
Liberal and Country	Lindsay Thompson		66.4	+4.1
Labor	Eric Perryman		33.6	−4.1
Liberal and Country hold		Swing	+4.1	

- Two party preferred vote was estimated.

=== Elections in the 1950s ===
1958 Victorian Legislative Council election: Higinbotham Province
Party	Candidate	Votes	%	±%
Liberal and Country	Arthur Warner	64,984	59.3	−40.7
Labor	Genevieve Mann	38,174	34.9	+34.9
Independent	Grace Stratton	6,345	5.9	+5.9
Total formal votes		109,503	98.2	
Informal votes		2,035	1.8	
Turnout		111,538	92.0	
Two-party-preferred result
Liberal and Country	Arthur Warner		62.3	
Labor	Genevieve Mann		37.7	
Liberal and Country hold		Swing	N/A	

- Two party preferred vote was estimated.
