= Candidates of the 1964 Victorian state election =

The 1964 Victorian state election was held on 27 June 1964.

== Retiring Members ==
=== Labor ===
- Bill Galvin MLA (Bendigo)

=== Liberal and Country ===
- Wilfred Mibus MLA (Lowan)
- Horace Petty MLA (Toorak)
- Gordon Scott MLA (Ballarat South)
- Sir Arthur Warner MLC (Higinbotham)

=== Country ===
- Richard Brose MLA (Rodney)
- Bill Fulton MLC (Gippsland)
- Dudley Walters MLC (Northern)

== Legislative Assembly ==
Sitting members are shown in bold text. Successful candidates are highlighted in the relevant colour. Where there is possible confusion, an asterisk (*) is also used.

Electorate	Held by	Labor candidates	LCP candidates	Country candidates	DLP candidates	Other candidates
Albert Park	Labor	**Keith Sutton**	Geoffrey Ryan		Albert Jones	
Ballarat North	LCP	John Hayes	**Tom Evans**		Walter Brown	
Ballarat South	LCP	Jack Jones	Bill Stephen		Francis Brown	
Balwyn	LCP	Tony Lamb	**Alex Taylor**		James Tighe	
Benalla	Country		Ewen Cameron	**Tom Trewin**	Christopher Cody	
Benambra	Country	Edwin Ure	Ronald Petty	**Tom Mitchell**	John Drummond	
Bendigo	Labor	Donald McIntyre	Robert Trethewey		Paul Brennan	
Box Hill	LCP	Race Mathews	**George Reid**		Edmund Burgi	
Brighton	LCP	Andrew Reid	**John Rossiter**		Edwin McSweeney	
Broadmeadows	Labor	**John Wilton**	Francis Robinson		James Marmion	
Brunswick East	Labor	**Leo Fennessy**	Neil McDonell		James Abikhair	Rex Mortimer (CPA)
Brunswick West	Labor	**Campbell Turnbull**	James Pond		John Flint	
Burwood	LCP	Mary Barnard	**Jim MacDonald**		Kenneth Abbott	
Camberwell	LCP	Dolph Eddy	**Vernon Wilcox**		John Rogers	
Caulfield	LCP	Robert Vernon	**Alexander Fraser**		Celia Laird	
Coburg	Labor	**Charlie Mutton**	John Knight		John Hardy	
Dandenong	LCP	Alan Lind	**Len Reid**		Kevin Leydon	Francis McGarry (CPA)
Dundas	LCP	Bob McClure	**Sir William McDonald**	Reginald Fogarty	James Eveston	
Elsternwick	LCP	Robert Garlick	**Richard Gainey**		Edward Preece	
Essendon	LCP	Richard Kirby	**Kenneth Wheeler**		Kevin Digby	
Evelyn	LCP	Donald King	**Russell Stokes**		Kevin Gould	
Fitzroy	Labor	**Denis Lovegrove**	Harley Price		Nino Randazzo	
Flemington	Labor	**Kevin Holland**	Neal Greig		Michael McMahon	
Footscray	Labor	**Bill Divers**	Roland Hapke		Robert O'Connor	David Davies (CPA)
Geelong	LCP	Robert Robertson	**Hayden Birrell**		Desmond Guinane	
Geelong West	LCP	Neil Trezise	**Max Gillett**		James Mahoney	
Gippsland East	Country		Rae Archibald	**Bruce Evans**	Frank Burns	
Gippsland South	Country		Peter Martin	**Sir Herbert Hyland**	Geoffrey Farrell	
Gippsland West	Country	Donald McLeod	Harry Marson	**Leslie Cochrane**	Kevin Scanlon	
Grant	Labor	**Roy Crick**	Francis Hunter		Robert Bainbridge	
Hampden	LCP	Arthur Solly	**Henry Bolte**		Francis O'Brien	
Hawthorn	LCP	Horrie Garrick	Walter Jona		Charles Murphy	Geoffrey Broomhall (CCP); **Peter Garrisson** (Ind Lib)
Ivanhoe	LCP	William Kelly	**Vernon Christie**		Cyril Cummins	
Kara Kara	LCP	George Jeffs	**Keith Turnbull**	Bill Phelan	Bruno d'Elia	
Kew	LCP	William Cooper	**Arthur Rylah**		Francis Duffy	
Lowan	LCP		Jim McCabe	Lloyd Atkin	Frits Albers	
Malvern	LCP	Adrianus Knulst	**John Bloomfield**		James Harkin	
Melbourne	Labor	**Arthur Clarey**	Bill Burns		Thomas Brennan	
Mentone	LCP	Harold Blair	**Edward Meagher**		George White	
Midlands	Labor	**Clive Stoneham**	Roger McArthur		John Timberlake	
Mildura	Country	Lance Fraser	Bruce Wright	**Milton Whiting**	Donald Delaney	
Moonee Ponds	LCP	Tom Edmunds	**Jack Holden**		Barry O'Brien	
Moorabbin	Independent	Ken Farrall	**Bob Suggett**		Thomas McDonald	
Mornington	LCP	Ken Stafford	**Roberts Dunstan**		John Cass	
Morwell	LCP	George Wragg	**Jim Balfour**	Ian Gibson	Bernard Shaw	
Mulgrave	LCP	Aubrey Walker	**Ray Wiltshire**		Ivan Frawley	
Murray Valley	Country		Thomas Gribben	**George Moss**	John Patterson	
Northcote	Labor	**Frank Wilkes**	Max Crellin		Jack Little	
Oakleigh	LCP	Val Doube	**Alan Scanlan**		Morris Kinnane	Jean McKeown (Ind)
Ormond	LCP	Kenneth Stone	**Joe Rafferty**		Robert Semmel	
Polwarth	LCP	Edwin Morris	**Tom Darcy**		Thomas Fleming	
Portland	LCP	George Gowty	**George Gibbs**	Leonard Mibus	John Russell	
Prahran	LCP	Robert Pettiona	**Sam Loxton**		Gordon Haberman	John Amurry (Ind)
Preston	Labor	**Charlie Ring**	Henry Newland		Michael Lucy	
Reservoir	Labor	**Harry Jenkins**	Peter Coupe		Frederick Whitling	William Barnes (CPA)
Richmond	Labor	**Clyde Holding**	Leon Bram		Sydney Tutton	
Ringwood	LCP	Graham Walsh	**Jim Manson**		Kevin Adamson	
Ripponlea	LCP	Anthony Fisher	**Edgar Tanner**		Joseph O'Leary	
Rodney	Country		John Quinn	Russell McDonald	Spencer Broom	
St Kilda	LCP	Juliet Dahlitz	Brian Dixon		John Hughes	
Sandringham	LCP	Russell Castley	**Murray Porter**		William Leech	John O'Mara (CPA)
Scoresby	LCP	Caroline Wilder	**Bill Borthwick**		Peter Tunstall	
Swan Hill	Country	Jack McLean	Bernard Treseder	Thomas Mellor; **Harold Stirling***	John McMahon	
Toorak	LCP	George Gahan	Philip Hudson		Rita McGuinness	
Williamstown	Labor	**Larry Floyd**	Robert Lawson		Kenneth Berrie	William Tregear (CPA)
Yarraville	Labor	**Roy Schintler**	Bernard Wallace		Alfred Gerrard	

== Legislative Council ==
Sitting members are shown in bold text. Successful candidates are highlighted in the relevant colour. Where there is possible confusion, an asterisk (*) is also used.

Province	Held by	Labor candidates	LCP candidates	Country candidates	DLP candidates
Ballarat	LCP	Gordon Campbell	**Murray Byrne**		William Bruty
Bendigo	Labor	**Arthur Smith**	Jock Granter		William Drechsler
Doutta Galla	Labor	**Samuel Merrifield**	Victor French		Peter McCabe
East Yarra	LCP	John Paterson	**Rupert Hamer**		John Hoare
Gippsland	Country		Archie Tanner	Arthur Hewson	John Hansen
Higinbotham	LCP	Colin Campbell	Baron Snider		Francis Sampson
Melbourne	Labor	**Jack O'Connell**	Donald Gibson		Leo Morison
Melbourne North	Labor	**John Walton**	Alan Jarman		Henry Darroch
Melbourne West	Labor	**Archie Todd**	Graham Strang		Bert Bailey
Monash	LCP	Brian Bourke	**Graham Nicol**		John Olle
Northern	Country		Laurence Troy	Michael Clarke	William Bond
North Eastern	Country		James Shannon	**Ivan Swinburne**	Michael Smyth
North Western	Country	Kevin Raymond	Kathleen Richardson	**Percy Byrnes**	Desmond Cotter
Southern	LCP	Geraldus Den Dulk	**Raymond Garrett**		Raymond Studham
South Eastern	LCP	Bruce Aitken	**Bill Mair**		Martin Curry
South Western	LCP	Gordon Scholes	**Geoffrey Thom**		Gerald Gleeson
Western	LCP	Bill Lewis	**Kenneth Gross**	Linden Cameron	Johannes Smoes
