= Electoral results for the district of Ballarat South =

Victoria, Australia, district election results

This is a list of electoral results for the electoral district of Ballarat South in Victorian state elections.

== Members for Ballarat South ==
Member	Party	Term
Gordon Scott	Liberal and Country	1955–1964
Bill Stephen	Liberal and Country	1964–1965
Bill Stephen	Liberal	1965–1979
Joan Chambers	Liberal	1979–1982
Frank Sheehan	Labor	1982–1992

== Election results ==
=== Elections in the 1980s ===
1988 Victorian state election: Ballarat South
Party	Candidate	Votes	%	±%
Labor	Frank Sheehan	14,320	46.47	−4.90
Liberal	Joan Chambers	13,385	43.44	−5.19
National	Donald Phelan	1,993	6.47	+6.47
Democrats	Phil Henseleit	1,116	3.62	+3.62
Total formal votes		30,814		
Informal votes				
Turnout				
Two-party-preferred result
Labor	Frank Sheehan	15,457	50.17	−1.20
Liberal	Joan Chambers	15,353	49.83	+1.20
Labor hold		Swing	−1.20	

1985 Victorian state election: Ballarat South
Party	Candidate	Votes	%	±%
Labor	Frank Sheehan	14,780	51.8	+2.6
Liberal	Clive Bubb	13,764	48.2	+2.7
Total formal votes		28,544	98.2	
Informal votes		518	1.8	
Turnout		29,062	94.7	
Labor hold		Swing	−0.4	

1982 Victorian state election: Ballarat South
Party	Candidate	Votes	%	±%
Labor	Frank Sheehan	13,069	48.76	+3.91
Liberal	Joan Chambers	12,291	45.86	+0.24
Democrats	Stuart Kelly	1,442	5.38	−0.86
Total formal votes		26,802	98.56	+0.63
Informal votes		391	1.44	−0.63
Turnout		27,193	95.03	+0.19
Two-party-preferred result
Labor	Frank Sheehan	13,916	51.92	+2.30
Liberal	Joan Chambers	12,886	48.08	−2.30
Labor gain from Liberal		Swing	+2.30	

=== Elections in the 1970s ===
1979 Victorian state election: Ballarat South
Party	Candidate	Votes	%	±%
Liberal	Joan Chambers	11,671	45.62	−8.52
Labor	Frank Sheehan	11,474	44.85	−1.01
Democrats	June Johnson	1,597	6.24	+6.24
Independent	Glendon Ludbrook	841	3.29	+3.29
Total formal votes		25,583	97.93	+0.51
Informal votes		542	2.07	−0.51
Turnout		26,125	94.84	+0.07
Two-party-preferred result
Liberal	Joan Chambers	12,889	50.38	−3.76
Labor	Frank Sheehan	12,694	49.62	+3.76
Liberal hold		Swing	−3.76	

1976 Victorian state election: Ballarat South
Party	Candidate	Votes	%	±%
Liberal	Bill Stephen	12,985	54.1	+11.4
Labor	Frank Sheehan	11,001	45.9	+4.1
Total formal votes		23,986	97.4	
Informal votes		635	2.6	
Turnout		24,621	94.8	
Liberal hold		Swing	+0.3	

1973 Victorian state election: Ballarat South
Party	Candidate	Votes	%	±%
Liberal	Bill Stephen	10,197	43.10	−1.10
Labor	Frank Sheehan	9,730	41.13	+1.86
Democratic Labor	John Parkin	2,117	8.95	−7.58
Country	Graeme Orr	1,613	6.82	+6.82
Total formal votes		23,657	97.31	−0.31
Informal votes		654	2.69	+0.31
Turnout		24,311	94.48	−1.24
Two-party-preferred result
Liberal	Bill Stephen	13,010	54.99	−1.10
Labor	Frank Sheehan	9,730	45.01	+1.10
Liberal hold		Swing	−1.10	

1970 Victorian state election: Ballarat South
Party	Candidate	Votes	%	±%
Liberal	Bill Stephen	9,530	44.20	+0.73
Labor	Tom Cullen	8,467	39.27	+0.10
Democratic Labor	Francis Brown	3,563	16.53	−0.83
Total formal votes		21,560	97.62	+0.27
Informal votes		525	2.38	−0.27
Turnout		22,085	95.72	+0.03
Two-party-preferred result
Liberal	Bill Stephen	12,094	56.09	+0.30
Labor	Tom Cullen	9,466	43.91	−0.30

=== Elections in the 1960s ===
1967 Victorian state election: Ballarat South
Party	Candidate	Votes	%	±%
Liberal	Bill Stephen	9,208	43.47	+1.19
Labor	Philip Gray	8,298	39.17	−0.77
Democratic Labor	Francis Brown	3,678	17.36	−0.41
Total formal votes		21,184	97.35	−0.45
Informal votes		576	2.65	+0.45
Turnout		21,760	95.69	+0.28
Two-party-preferred result
Liberal	Bill Stephen	11,818	55.79	+1.09
Labor	Philip Gray	9,366	44.21	−1.09
Liberal hold		Swing	+1.09	

1964 Victorian state election: Ballarat South
Party	Candidate	Votes	%	±%
Liberal and Country	Bill Stephen	8,635	42.28	+1.87
Labor	Jack Jones	8,158	39.94	−1.45
Democratic Labor	Francis Brown	3,630	17.77	−0.43
Total formal votes		20,423	97.80	−0.67
Informal votes		459	2.20	+0.67
Turnout		20,882	95.41	−0.24
Two-party-preferred result
Liberal and Country	Bill Stephen	11,172	54.70	−1.96
Labor	Jack Jones	9,251	45.30	+1.96
Liberal and Country hold		Swing	−1.96	

1961 Victorian state election: Ballarat South
Party	Candidate	Votes	%	±%
Labor	Ron Wilson	8,394	41.39	+6.43
Liberal and Country	Gordon Scott	8,194	40.41	+0.91
Democratic Labor	Francis Brown	3,691	18.20	−0.90
Total formal votes		20,279	98.47	+0.30
Informal votes		316	1.53	−0.30
Turnout		20,595	95.65	−0.57
Two-party-preferred result
Liberal and Country	Gordon Scott	11,491	56.66	−2.46
Labor	Ron Wilson	8,788	43.34	+2.46

=== Elections in the 1950s ===
1958 Victorian state election: Ballarat South
Party	Candidate	Votes	%	±%
Liberal and Country	Gordon Scott	7,988	39.50	−1.03
Labor	Max Pinkard	7,071	34.96	−7.80
Democratic Labor	Leslie D'Arcy	3,864	19.10	+2.39
Country	Arthur Philips	1,302	6.44	+6.44
Total formal votes		20,225	98.17	−0.48
Informal votes		377	1.83	+0.48
Turnout		20,602	96.22	+0.15
Two-party-preferred result
Liberal and Country	Gordon Scott	11,957	59.12	+5.11
Labor	Max Pinkard	8,268	40.88	−5.11
Liberal and Country hold		Swing	+5.11	

1955 Victorian state election: Ballarat South
Party	Candidate	Votes	%	±%
Labor	Jack Sheehan	8,317	42.76	
Liberal and Country	Gordon Scott	7,883	40.53	
Labor (A-C)	Alfred Purdue	3,249	16.71	
Total formal votes		19,449	98.65	
Informal votes		267	1.35	
Turnout		19,716	96.07	
Two-party-preferred result
Liberal and Country	Gordon Scott	10,506	54.01	
Labor	Jack Sheehan	8,943	45.99	
Liberal and Country win		(new seat)		
