= Candidates of the 1970 Victorian state election =

The 1970 Victorian state election was held on 30 May 1970.

== Retiring Members ==
=== Labor ===
- Bill Divers MLA (Footscray)
- Leo Fennessy MLA (Brunswick East)
- Charlie Ring MLA (Preston)
- Clive Stoneham MLA (Midlands)
- Keith Sutton MLA (Albert Park)
- Samuel Merrifield MLC (Doutta Galla)
- Archie Todd MLC (Melbourne West)

=== Liberal ===
- Sir John Bloomfield MLA (Malvern)
- Tom Darcy MLA (Polwarth)
- Murray Porter MLA (Sandringham)
- Geoffrey Thom MLC (South Western)

=== Country ===
- Leslie Cochrane MLA (Gippsland West)
- Sir Herbert Hyland MLA (Gippsland South)

== Legislative Assembly ==
Sitting members are shown in bold text. Successful candidates are highlighted in the relevant colour. Where there is possible confusion, an asterisk (*) is also used.

Electorate	Held by	Labor candidates	Liberal candidates	Country candidates	DLP candidates	Other candidates
Albert Park	Labor	Val Doube	Wallace Cameron		Monica McGeoch	
Ballarat North	Liberal	Kevin Flynn	**Tom Evans**		Walter Brown	
Ballarat South	Liberal	Tom Cullen	**Bill Stephen**		Francis Brown	
Balwyn	Liberal	Donald Phelan	**Alex Taylor**		John Hansen	
Bellarine	Liberal	Francis Brady	**Aurel Smith**		James Crockett	
Benalla	Country	John Coutts	Dulcie Brack	**Tom Trewin**	Christopher Cody	
Benambra	Country	Edwin Ure	Robert Prior	**Tom Mitchell**	Francis Keenan	John Hicks (Ind)
Bendigo	Liberal	Kevin Curran	**Robert Trethewey**		Paul Brennan	
Bennettswood	Liberal	Cyril Kennedy	**Ian McLaren**		James Tighe	
Bentleigh	Liberal	Kenneth Williams	**Bob Suggett**		Peter Madden	Noel Allen (Ind); Mary Ovenden (Ind)
Box Hill	Liberal	Maurice Sevior	**George Reid**		James Marmion	John Clarkson (Ind)
Brighton	Liberal	Peter Hansen	**John Rossiter**		Keith Linard	Malcolm Wallace-Mitchell (Ind)
Broadmeadows	Labor	**John Wilton**	Howard Thain		Francis Dowling	
Brunswick East	Labor	David Bornstein	James Guest		Anthony Staunton	
Brunswick West	Labor	**Campbell Turnbull**	Walter Dale		John Flint	
Camberwell	Liberal	Allan McDonald	**Vernon Wilcox**		Joseph Stanley	
Caulfield	Liberal	George Papadopoulos	**Sir Edgar Tanner**		Peter Grant	Evelyn Janover (Ind)
Coburg	Independent	Frank Cox	Joan Mathieson		Peter McCabe	**Jack Mutton** (Ind)
Dandenong	Labor	**Alan Lind**	Wallace Werrett		Kevin Leydon	
Deer Park	Labor	**Jack Ginifer**	Douglas Reinehr		John Cate	
Dromana	Liberal	Neil McIntosh	**Roberts Dunstan**		Josephus Gobel	
Dundas	Liberal	Edward Lewis	**Sir William McDonald**	Alexander McLennan	James Eveston	Alma Crouch (DGS); John Moodie (Ind)
Essendon	Liberal	Ronald Kennelly	**Kenneth Wheeler**		Kevin Digby	
Evelyn	Liberal	Raymond Donkin	**Russell Stokes**		Alfred Gerrard	Maurice Smith (Ind)
Footscray	Labor	Robert Fordham	Claus Brumm		Robin Thomas	
Frankston	Liberal	Mervyn Vogt	**Edward Meagher**		John Glynn	
Geelong	Liberal	John Woolfe	**Hayden Birrell**		John Timberlake	
Geelong North	Labor	**Neil Trezise**	Graeme Hawkins		James Jordan	
Gippsland East	Country	Philip Grech	Keith Mason	**Bruce Evans**	Frank Burns	
Gippsland South	Country	Thomas Matthews	James Taylor	John Vinall	John Condon	
Gippsland West	Country	James Hudson	Rob Maclellan	Robert Anderson	Michael Houlihan	
Gisborne	Liberal	Robert Harrison	**Julian Doyle**		Raymond Studham	Roy Hartley (Ind)
Glen Iris	Liberal	Douglas Gammon	**Jim MacDonald**		John Preece	
Glenhuntly	Liberal	Henry Pickard	**Joe Rafferty**		Raymond Murphy	
Greensborough	Liberal	Bob Fell	**Monte Vale**		Raymond Morrissey	Dorothy Frost (DGS)
Hampden	Liberal	Vincent Ayres	**Sir Henry Bolte**	Gilbert Anderson	Francis O'Brien	
Hawthorn	Liberal	David Andrews	**Walter Jona**		Bernard Gaynor	
Heatherton	Liberal	Kenneth Bathie	**Norman Billing**		Joseph O'Neill	Herman Crowther (Ind)
Ivanhoe	Liberal	Thomas Rich	**Vernon Christie**		Michael Lucy	
Kara Kara	Country	Esmond Curnow	Bruce Thornhill	**Bill Phelan**	Robert O'Connor	
Kew	Liberal	Rosslyn Ives	**Sir Arthur Rylah**		Francis Duffy	Dorothy Buchanan (Ind); Bertram Wainer (Ind)
Lowan	Country	Gustav Lehmann	Jim McCabe	**Ray Buckley**	John Giles	
Malvern	Liberal	Christopher Gaffney	Lindsay Thompson		Thomas O'Reilly	
Melbourne	Labor	**Arthur Clarey**	Allan Waite		Michael McMahon	
Mentone	Liberal	Henry Woodley	**Bill Templeton**		Kathleen Andrews	
Midlands	Labor	Les Shilton	William Turnor	Leston Laity	Francis Hill	
Mildura	Country	Lance Fraser	Kevin Coogan	**Milton Whiting**	John Conroy	
Mitcham	Liberal	John Hyslop	**Dorothy Goble**		Marianne Crowe	Ray Nilsen (DGS)
Monbulk	Liberal	James Simmonds	**Bill Borthwick**		George Noone	
Moonee Ponds	Labor	**Tom Edmunds**	John Williams		Barry O'Brien	
Moorabbin	Liberal	Harry Rourke	**Llew Reese**		Salvatore Pinzone	
Morwell	Liberal	Derek Amos	**Archie Tanner**	James Wyeth	Thomas Lawless	
Murray Valley	Country	Valda Reid	Robert Crosby	**George Moss**	John Patterson	
Narracan	Liberal	Wilfred Bartholomeusz	**Jim Balfour**	Reinhardt Reuter	Peter Saunders	
Northcote	Labor	**Frank Wilkes**			Albert Dowsey	
Oakleigh	Liberal	Anthony Scarcella	**Alan Scanlan**		Bernard Slattery	
Polwarth	Liberal	John O'Brien	Cec Burgin	Douglas Wade	Leonard Eyre	
Portland	Liberal	Bill Lewis	**Don McKellar**	Alma Uebergang	Adrian McInerney	
Prahran	Liberal	Ivan Trayling	**Sam Loxton**		John Johnston	James Banks (Ind); David Tuck (DGS)
Preston	Labor	Carl Kirkwood	Bruce Spicer		Maurice Horwood	
Reservoir	Labor	**Jim Simmonds**	Robert Pritchard		Joseph Fitzgerald	
Richmond	Labor	**Clyde Holding**	Ronald Turner		Terence Scully	George Samargis (Ind)
Ringwood	Liberal	Beatrice Rosindell	**Jim Manson**		Edmund Sablovs	
Rodney	Country	Doris Best	Ian Biggar	**Russell McDonald**	Patrick Hansen	
St Kilda	Liberal	David Bottomley	**Brian Dixon**		John Hughes	Lancelot Hutchinson (DGS); Neville Penton (Ind)
Sandringham	Liberal	Margaret Graham	Max Crellin		William Leech	
Scoresby	Liberal	Alan West	**Geoff Hayes**		Noel Clarke	
Shepparton	Country	Graham Romanes	Linton Laws	**Peter Ross-Edwards**	Bruno D'Elia	Bill Hunter (Ind)
Sunshine	Labor	**Denis Lovegrove**	Vaclav Ubl		Robert Charles	
Swan Hill	Country	Jack McLean	Laurence Troy	**Henry Broad**	Rodger Donohue	
Syndal	Liberal	Peter Setford	**Ray Wiltshire**		Daniel McCabe	
Warrnambool	Liberal	Donald Grossman	**Ian Smith**	Cyril Boyle	Francis Hasell	Robert McCosh (DGS)
Williamstown	Labor	**Larry Floyd**	Richard Groom		Norman Way	

== Legislative Council ==
Sitting members are shown in bold text. Successful candidates are highlighted in the relevant colour. Where there is possible confusion, an asterisk (*) is also used.

Province	Held by	Labor candidates	Liberal candidates	Country candidates	DLP candidates	Other candidates
Ballarat	Liberal	Jack Jones	**Murray Byrne**		William Bruty	
Bendigo	Liberal	Stewart Anderson	**Jock Granter**		William Drechsler	
Boronia	Liberal	Niall Brennan	Vernon Hauser		Edmund Burgi	
Doutta Galla	Labor	Dolph Eddy	William Pearce		Hubert Evans	
East Yarra	Liberal	Stanley Bannan	**Rupert Hamer**		John Rogers	
Gippsland	Country	Eric Kent	Dick Long	**Arthur Hewson**	Gregory Answorth	
Higinbotham	Liberal	Anthony Balmer	**Murray Hamilton**		Frederick Skinner	
Melbourne	Labor	**Jack O'Connell**	Norman Long		Gordon Haberman	
Melbourne North	Labor	**John Walton**	Jean Baldwin		Henry Darroch	
Melbourne West	Labor	Bunna Walsh	William McDonald		Kenneth Berrie	
Monash	Liberal	Donald Reeves	**Graham Nicol**		William Hoyne	Reginald Murphy (Ind)
Northern	Country	Trevor Monti	Albert Baker	**Michael Clarke**	James Bourke	
North Eastern	Country	Colin Sutherland	George Ikinger	**Ivan Swinburne**	Johannes Van Der Horst	
North Western	Country	Pamela Fowler	Heather Mitchell	**Bernie Dunn**	Stanley Croughan	
South Eastern	Labor	**Ian Cathie**	Roy Ward		John Launder	
South Western	Liberal	Stanley Nash	Glyn Jenkins	Bartus De Groot	William Bond	
Templestowe	Liberal	Neville Telfer	**Raymond Garrett**		Ernest Dobson	
Western	Liberal	Thomas Windsor	**Kenneth Gross**	Linden Cameron	Alan Beattie	
