= Electoral results for the district of Geelong West =

Victoria, Australia, district election results

This is a list of electoral results for the electoral district of Geelong West in Victorian state elections.

== Members ==
First incarnation (1859–1877, 2 members)
Member 1	Term	Member 2	Term
John Henry Brooke	1859 – 1864	James Harrison	1859 – 1860
John Henry Brooke	1859 – 1864	Nicholas Foott	1860^{[b]} – 1868^{[d]}
George Brown	1864 – 1865	Nicholas Foott	1860^{[b]} – 1868^{[d]}
Richard Heath	1866 – 1867	Nicholas Foott	1860^{[b]} – 1868^{[d]}
James Gattie Carr	1868 – 1870	Graham Berry	1868^{[b]} – 1877
Robert de Bruce Johnstone	1870^{[b]} – 1877	Graham Berry	1868^{[b]} – 1877

^{[d]} Foott died 24 September 1868, replaced by Graham Berry in October 1868.
Johnstone and Berry went on to represent the re-created Geelong from 1877.

Second incarnation (1955–1967)
Member	Party	Term
Colin MacDonald	Labor	1955–1958
Max Gillett	Liberal and Country	1958–1964
Neil Trezise	Labor	1964–1967

Third incarnation (1976–1985)
Member	Party	Term
Hayden Birrell	Liberal	1976–1982
Hayden Shell	Labor	1982–1985

== Election results ==
=== Elections in the 1980s ===
1982 Victorian state election: Geelong West
Party	Candidate	Votes	%	±%
Labor	Hayden Shell	11,814	49.6	+4.5
Liberal	Michael Henderson	10,367	43.5	−5.4
Democrats	Penelope Collet	1,662	7.0	+1.0
Total formal votes		23,843	98.1	+0.4
Informal votes		464	1.9	−0.4
Turnout		24,307	94.2	+0.4
Two-party-preferred result
Labor	Hayden Shell	12,610	52.9	+3.7
Liberal	Michael Henderson	11,233	47.1	−3.7
Labor gain from Liberal		Swing	+3.7	

=== Elections in the 1970s ===
1979 Victorian state election: Geelong West
Party	Candidate	Votes	%	±%
Liberal	Hayden Birrell	11,640	48.9	−6.3
Labor	Hayden Shell	10,725	45.1	+0.3
Democrats	Guenter Sahr	1,436	6.0	+6.0
Total formal votes		23,801	97.7	0.0
Informal votes		561	2.3	0.0
Turnout		24,362	93.8	−1.3
Two-party-preferred result
Liberal	Hayden Birrell	12,092	50.8	−4.4
Labor	Hayden Shell	11,709	49.2	+4.4
Liberal hold		Swing	−4.4	

1976 Victorian state election: Geelong West
Party	Candidate	Votes	%	±%
Liberal	Hayden Birrell	13,111	55.2	+10.9
Labor	Kevin Kirby	10,658	44.8	−0.6
Total formal votes		23,769	97.7	
Informal votes		551	2.3	
Turnout		24,320	95.1	
Liberal hold		Swing	+2.5	

=== Elections in the 1960s ===
1964 Victorian state election: Geelong West
Party	Candidate	Votes	%	±%
Labor	Neil Trezise	12,794	48.5	+0.5
Liberal and Country	Max Gillett	10,029	38.0	−0.6
Democratic Labor	James Mahoney	3,585	13.6	+0.2
Total formal votes		26,408	98.1	+0.1
Informal votes		508	1.9	−0.1
Turnout		26,916	95.5	+1.0
Two-party-preferred result
Labor	Neil Trezise	13,236	50.1	+0.3
Liberal and Country	Max Gillett	13,172	49.9	−0.3
Labor gain from Liberal and Country		Swing	+0.3	

1961 Victorian state election: Geelong West
Party	Candidate	Votes	%	±%
Labor	Neil Trezise	11,510	48.0	+0.5
Liberal and Country	Max Gillett	9,244	38.6	−0.8
Democratic Labor	James Mahoney	3,207	13.4	+0.3
Total formal votes		23,961	98.0	−0.5
Informal votes		496	2.0	+0.5
Turnout		24,457	94.5	+1.3
Two-party-preferred result
Liberal and Country	Max Gillett	12,032	50.2	+0.1
Labor	Neil Trezise	11,929	49.8	−0.1
Liberal and Country hold		Swing	+0.1	

=== Elections in the 1950s ===
1958 Victorian state election: Geelong West
Party	Candidate	Votes	%	±%
Labor	Colin MacDonald	10,107	47.5	
Liberal and Country	Max Gillett	8,388	39.4	
Democratic Labor	James Mahoney	2,797	13.1	
Total formal votes		21,292	98.5	
Informal votes		331	1.5	
Turnout		21,623	93.2	
Two-party-preferred result
Liberal and Country	Max Gillett	10,658	50.1	
Labor	Colin MacDonald	10,634	49.9	
Liberal and Country gain from Labor		Swing		

1955 Victorian state election: Geelong West
Party	Candidate	Votes	%	±%
Liberal and Country	Geoffrey Thom	8,237	38.2	
Labor	Colin MacDonald	6,921	32.1	
Independent	James Dunn	2,720	12.6	
Labor (A-C)	James Mahoney	2,359	10.9	
Independent	James Dowsett	1,315	6.1	
Total formal votes		21,552	97.4	
Informal votes		585	2.6	
Turnout		22,137	93.4	
Two-party-preferred result
Labor	Colin MacDonald	11,589	53.8	
Liberal and Country	Geoffrey Thom	9,963	46.2	
Labor hold		Swing		
