= Results of the 1964 Victorian state election (Legislative Council) =

Victorian state election, 27 June 1964 Legislative Council << 1961–1967 >>
Enrolled voters	1,635,311				
Votes cast	1,543,586		Turnout	94.4	–0.1
Informal votes	45,627		Informal	3.0	–0.2
Summary of votes by party
Party	Primary votes	%	Swing	Seats won	Seats held
Liberal and Country	600,600	40.1	+2.1	9	18
Labor	531,510	35.5	–3.4	4	8
Democratic Labor	232,445	15.5	–1.2	0	0
Country	133,403	8.9	+2.7	4	8
Total	1,497,958			17	34

This is a list of Legislative Council results for the Victorian 1964 state election. 17 of the 34 seats were contested.

== Results by province ==
=== Ballarat ===
1964 Victorian state election: Ballarat Province
Party	Candidate	Votes	%	±%
Liberal and Country	Murray Byrne	27,833	50.7	+10.4
Labor	Gordon Campbell	18,935	34.5	−7.8
Democratic Labor	William Bruty	8,134	14.8	−2.7
Total formal votes		54,902	98.2	+0.2
Informal votes		1,017	1.8	−0.2
Turnout		55,919	96.2	+0.4
Two-party-preferred result
Liberal and Country	Murray Byrne		64.0	+7.9
Labor	Gordon Campbell		36.0	−7.9
Liberal and Country hold		Swing	+7.9	

- Two party preferred vote was estimated.

=== Bendigo ===
1964 Victorian state election: Bendigo Province
Party	Candidate	Votes	%	±%
Labor	Arthur Smith	25,664	45.2	+1.2
Liberal and Country	Jock Granter	21,004	37.0	−1.2
Democratic Labor	William Drechsler	10,168	14.8	−3.6
Total formal votes		56,836	98.1	+0.3
Informal votes		1,123	1.9	−0.3
Turnout		57,959	95.4	−0.8
Two-party-preferred result
Liberal and Country	Jock Granter	30,092	52.9	−1.1
Labor	Arthur Smith	26,744	47.1	+1.1
Liberal and Country gain from Labor		Swing	−1.1	

=== Doutta Galla ===
1964 Victorian state election: Doutta Galla Province
Party	Candidate	Votes	%	±%
Labor	Samuel Merrifield	45,486	49.3	+0.6
Liberal and Country	Victor French	30,810	33.4	+2.0
Democratic Labor	Peter McCabe	15,886	17.2	−2.7
Total formal votes		92,182	95.6	+0.3
Informal votes		4,237	4.4	−0.3
Turnout		96,419	94.0	+0.4
Two-party-preferred result
Labor	Samuel Merrifield	47,120	51.1	+0.6
Liberal and Country	Victor French	45,062	48.9	−0.6
Labor hold		Swing	+0.6	

=== East Yarra ===
1964 Victorian state election: East Yarra Province
Party	Candidate	Votes	%	±%
Liberal and Country	Rupert Hamer	73,387	59.7	+2.3
Labor	John Paterson	33,075	26.9	−0.7
Democratic Labor	John Hoare	16,508	13.4	−1.6
Total formal votes		122,970	97.7	−0.1
Informal votes		2,883	2.3	+0.1
Turnout		125,853	93.2	−3.0
Two-party-preferred result
Liberal and Country	Rupert Hamer		71.8	+0.9
Labor	John Paterson		28.2	−0.9
Liberal and Country hold		Swing	+0.9	

=== Gippsland ===
1964 Victorian state election: Gippsland Province
Party	Candidate	Votes	%	±%
Country	Arthur Hewson	38,696	53.2	+18.9
Liberal and Country	Archie Tanner	18,910	26.0	+6.7
Democratic Labor	John Hansen	15,077	20.7	+6.5
Total formal votes		72,683	97.3	+0.1
Informal votes		2,008	2.7	−0.1
Turnout		74,691	94.5	+0.1
Country hold		Swing	N/A	

- Preferences were not distributed.

=== Higinbotham ===
1964 Victorian state election: Higinbotham Province
Party	Candidate	Votes	%	±%
Liberal and Country	Baron Snider	59,791	53.0	+0.9
Labor	Colin Campbell	38,474	34.1	+4.0
Democratic Labor	Francis Sampson	14,635	13.0	−4.9
Total formal votes		112,900	97.6	+0.1
Informal votes		2,752	2.4	−0.1
Turnout		115,652	93.6	−0.5
Two-party-preferred result
Liberal and Country	Baron Snider		64.7	−1.7
Labor	Colin Campbell		35.3	+1.7
Liberal and Country hold		Swing	−1.7	

- Two party preferred vote was estimated.

=== Melbourne ===
1964 Victorian state election: Melbourne Province
Party	Candidate	Votes	%	±%
Labor	Jack O'Connell	20,211	57.4	−3.0
Liberal and Country	Donald Gibson	8,647	24.6	+5.8
Democratic Labor	Leo Morrison	6,362	18.1	−2.6
Total formal votes		35,220	93.9	+0.4
Informal votes		2,275	6.1	−0.4
Turnout		37,495	91.9	+1.5
Two-party-preferred result
Labor	Jack O'Connell		59.2	−4.1
Liberal and Country	Donald Gibson		40.8	+40.8
Labor hold		Swing	N/A	

=== Melbourne North ===
1964 Victorian state election: Melbourne North Province
Party	Candidate	Votes	%	±%
Labor	John Walton	67,535	49.7	−2.5
Liberal and Country	Alan Jarman	42,904	31.6	+2.1
Democratic Labor	Henry Darroch	25,408	18.7	+0.4
Total formal votes		135,847	96.6	−0.1
Informal votes		4,792	3.4	+0.1
Turnout		140,639	94.9	−0.1
Two-party-preferred result
Labor	John Walton	69,128	50.9	−3.1
Liberal and Country	Alan Jarman	66,719	49.1	+3.1
Labor hold		Swing	−3.1	

=== Melbourne West ===
1964 Victorian state election: Melbourne West Province
Party	Candidate	Votes	%	±%
Labor	Archie Todd	52,700	60.6	−2.3
Liberal and Country	Graham Strang	18,135	20.9	+6.6
Democratic Labor	Bert Bailey	16,062	18.5	−4.4
Total formal votes		86,897	95.7	−1.0
Informal votes		3,934	4.3	+1.0
Turnout		90,831	94.2	−0.8
Two-party-preferred result
Labor	Archie Todd		62.5	−1.8
Liberal and Country	Graham Strang		37.5	+1.8
Labor hold		Swing	−1.8	

=== Monash ===
1964 Victorian state election: Monash Province
Party	Candidate	Votes	%	±%
Liberal and Country	Graham Nicol	41,769	50.1	+1.3
Labor	Brian Bourke	31,483	37.8	+7.2
Democratic Labor	John Olle	10,059	12.1	−2.6
Total formal votes		83,111	96.4	+1.8
Informal votes		3,115	3.6	−1.8
Turnout		86,426	91.7	+0.2
Two-party-preferred result
Liberal and Country	Graham Nicol		61.0	−5.3
Labor	Brian Bourke		39.0	+5.3
Liberal and Country hold		Swing	−5.3	

- Two party preferred vote was estimated.

=== Northern ===
1964 Victorian state election: Northern Province
Party	Candidate	Votes	%	±%
Country	Michael Clarke	27,453	53.1	+10.8
Liberal and Country	Laurence Troy	15,418	29.8	+7.6
Democratic Labor	William Bond	8,809	17.0	+3.9
Total formal votes		51,680	97.0	+0.1
Informal votes		1,621	3.0	−0.1
Turnout		53,301	95.6	−0.8
Country hold		Swing	N/A	

- Preferences were not distributed.

=== North-Eastern ===
1964 Victorian state election: North-Eastern Province
Party	Candidate	Votes	%	±%
Country	Ivan Swinburne	29,478	53.1	+7.2
Liberal and Country	James Shannon	10,704	22.4	+6.6
Democratic Labor	Michael Smyth	7,568	15.9	+1.8
Total formal votes		47,750	97.3	−0.1
Informal votes		1,309	2.7	+0.1
Turnout		49,059	94.8	−0.3
Country hold		Swing	N/A	

- Preferences were not distributed.

=== North-Western ===
1964 Victorian state election: North-Western Province
Party	Candidate	Votes	%	±%
Country	Percy Byrnes	25,410	57.7	+6.6
Labor	Kevin Raymond	7,905	17.9	−1.6
Liberal and Country	Kathleen Richardson	6,844	15.5	−3.0
Democratic Labor	Desmond Cotter	3,916	8.9	−1.9
Total formal votes		44,075	97.5	+0.6
Informal votes		45,206	95.8	−0.1
Turnout		45,206	95.8	−0.1
Two-party-preferred result
Country	Percy Byrnes		77.2	+2.7
Labor	Kevin Raymond		22.8	−2.7
Country hold		Swing	+2.7	

- Two party preferred vote was estimated.

=== Southern ===
1964 Victorian state election: Southern Province
Party	Candidate	Votes	%	±%
Liberal and Country	Raymond Garrett	106,429	43.8	−1.8
Labor	Geraldus Den Dulk	100,331	41.3	+2.4
Democratic Labor	Raymond Studham	36,258	14.9	−0.6
Total formal votes		243,018	97.0	+0.1
Informal votes		7,416	3.0	−0.1
Turnout		250,434	94.9	+0.3
Two-party-preferred result
Liberal and Country	Raymond Garrett	139,352	57.3	−2.0
Labor	Geraldus Den Dulk	103,666	42.7	+2.0
Liberal and Country hold		Swing	−2.0	

=== South-Eastern ===
1964 Victorian state election: South Eastern Province
Party	Candidate	Votes	%	±%
Liberal and Country	Bill Mair	60,956	48.7	+1.6
Labor	Bruce Aitken	47,546	38.0	+0.4
Democratic Labor	Martin Curry	16,741	13.4	−1.9
Total formal votes		125,243	97.5	+0.1
Informal votes		3,169	2.5	−0.1
Turnout		128,412	94.1	−0.6
Two-party-preferred result
Liberal and Country	Bill Mair	74,828	59.7	−0.2
Labor	Bruce Aitken	50,415	40.3	+0.2
Liberal and Country hold		Swing	−0.2	

=== South-Western ===
1964 Victorian state election: South Western Province
Party	Candidate	Votes	%	±%
Liberal and Country	Geoffrey Thom	37,359	47.9	+2.5
Labor	Gordon Scholes	26,644	34.1	−2.5
Democratic Labor	Gerald Gleeson	14,045	18.0	0.0
Total formal votes		78,048	97.7	+0.3
Informal votes		1,870	2.3	−0.3
Turnout		79,918	95.6	+0.8
Two-party-preferred result
Liberal and Country	Geoffrey Thom	46,740	59.9	−1.7
Labor	Gordon Scholes	31,308	40.1	+1.7
Liberal and Country hold		Swing	−1.7	

=== Western ===
1964 Victorian state election: Western Province
Party	Candidate	Votes	%	±%
Liberal and Country	Kenneth Gross	19,700	36.2	−8.7
Labor	Bill Lewis	15,521	28.5	−10.4
Country	Linden Cameron	12,366	22.7	+22.7
Democratic Labor	Johannes Smoes	6,809	12.5	−3.7
Total formal votes		54,396	98.2	−0.2
Informal votes		975	1.8	+0.2
Turnout		55,371	96.1	−0.3
Two-party-preferred result
Liberal and Country	Kenneth Gross	36,117	66.4	+7.1
Labor	Bill Lewis	18,279	33.6	−7.1
Liberal and Country hold		Swing	+7.1	

== See also ==
- 1964 Victorian state election
- Candidates of the 1964 Victorian state election
- Members of the Victorian Legislative Council, 1964–1967
