= Electoral results for the district of Lara =

Regional election result

This is a list of electoral results for the district of Lara in Victorian state elections.

== Members for Lara ==
Member	Party	Term
Peter Loney	Labor	2002–2006
John Eren	Labor	2006–2022
Ella George	Labor	2022–present

== Election results ==
=== Elections in the 2020s ===
==== 2022 ====
2022 Victorian state election: Lara
Party	Candidate	Votes	%	±%
Labor	Ella George	19,635	49.7	−8.2
Liberal	Ralph Krein	8,460	21.4	−2.7
Greens	Courtney Gardner	4,473	11.3	+3.8
Family First	Steve Rankine	1,775	4.5	+4.5
Liberal Democrats	Max Payne	1,688	4.3	+4.3
Animal Justice	Peter Kelly	1,502	3.8	−3.1
Ind. (Socialist Alliance)	Sarah Hathway	1,050	2.6	+2.6
Angry Victorians	Ash Taylor	938	2.4	+2.4
Total formal votes		39,512	93.7	–0.4
Informal votes		2,677	6.3	+0.4
Turnout		42,189	86.2	–1.5
Two-party-preferred result
Labor	Ella George	26,027	65.9	−3.3
Liberal	Ralph Krein	13,485	34.1	+3.3
Labor hold		Swing	−3.3	

=== Elections in the 2010s ===
==== 2018 ====
2018 Victorian state election: Lara
Party	Candidate	Votes	%	±%
Labor	John Eren	22,951	57.92	+1.99
Liberal	Melissa Di Pasquale	9,559	24.12	−4.78
Greens	Amber Forbes	2,966	7.49	−1.41
Animal Justice	Bronwen Baker	2,740	6.92	+6.92
Victorian Socialists	Dean Cardigan	1,408	3.55	+3.55
Total formal votes		39,624	94.14	−1.26
Informal votes		2,467	5.86	+1.26
Turnout		42,091	89.51	−4.02
Two-party-preferred result
Labor	John Eren	27,430	69.14	+2.03
Liberal	Melissa Di Pasquale	12,244	30.86	−2.03
Labor hold		Swing	+2.03	

==== 2014 ====
2014 Victorian state election: Lara
Party	Candidate	Votes	%	±%
Labor	John Eren	21,457	55.9	+2.9
Liberal	Tony McManus	11,090	28.9	−2.3
Greens	Gregory Lacey	3,413	8.9	+0.5
Family First	Rami Fosberry	1,256	3.3	−1.6
Country Alliance	George Reed	1,148	3.0	+0.8
Total formal votes		38,364	95.4	+0.9
Informal votes		1,851	4.6	−0.9
Turnout		40,215	93.5	+3.4
Two-party-preferred result
Labor	John Eren	25,746	67.1	+3.3
Liberal	Tony McManus	12,618	32.9	−3.3
Labor hold		Swing	+3.3	

==== 2010 ====
2010 Victorian state election: Lara
Party	Candidate	Votes	%	±%
Labor	John Eren	20,778	53.61	−5.59
Liberal	Robert Eyton	11,366	29.33	+3.39
Greens	Rob Leach	3,401	8.77	+2.12
Family First	Glenn Colla	2,324	6.00	−2.21
Country Alliance	Keith McDermott	889	2.29	+2.29
Total formal votes		38,758	94.23	+0.25
Informal votes		2,373	5.77	−0.25
Turnout		41,131	93.29	+0.68
Two-party-preferred result
Labor	John Eren	25,299	65.40	−2.53
Liberal	Robert Eyton	13,387	34.60	+2.53
Labor hold		Swing	−2.53	

=== Elections in the 2000s ===
==== 2006 ====
2006 Victorian state election: Lara
Party	Candidate	Votes	%	±%
Labor	John Eren	23,872	67.7	−4.6
Liberal	Angelo Kakouros	9,139	25.9	+0.3
Family First	Peter Haines	2,894	8.2	+8.2
Greens	Catherine Jones	2,344	6.7	+0.0
Total formal votes		35,237	94.0	−2.2
Informal votes		2,258	6.0	+2.2
Turnout		37,495	92.6	
Two-party-preferred result
Labor	John Eren	23,872	67.7	−4.6
Liberal	Angelo Kakouros	11,365	32.3	+4.6
Labor hold		Swing	−4.6	

==== 2002 ====
2002 Victorian state election: Lara
Party	Candidate	Votes	%	±%
Labor	Peter Loney	22,673	65.0	+2.7
Liberal	Linda Ristevski	8,921	25.6	−11.4
Greens	Kim Baranowski	2,341	6.7	+6.2
Socialist Alliance	Brigitte Ellery	965	2.8	+2.8
Total formal votes		34,900	96.2	−0.7
Informal votes		1,395	3.8	+0.7
Turnout		36,295	93.7	
Two-party-preferred result
Labor	Peter Loney	25,211	72.3	+9.6
Liberal	Linda Ristevski	9,638	27.7	−9.6
Labor hold		Swing	+9.6	
