= Electoral results for the district of Geelong North =

Victoria, Australia, district election results

This is a list of electoral results for the Electoral district of Geelong North in Victorian state elections.

== Members for Geelong North ==
| Member | Party | Term |
|---|---|---|
| Neil Trezise | Labor | 1967-1992 |
| Peter Loney | Labor | 1992-2002 |

== Election results ==
=== Elections in the 1990s ===
1999 Victorian state election: Geelong North
| Party | Candidate | Votes | % | ±% |
|---|---|---|---|---|
| Labor | Peter Loney | 19,000 | 60.9 | +2.9 |
| Liberal | Bryan Kennett | 12,176 | 39.1 | −2.9 |
| Total formal votes | | 31,176 | 96.4 | −0.6 |
| Informal votes | | 1,158 | 3.6 | +0.6 |
| Turnout | | 32,334 | 94.1 | −1.3 |
| Labor hold | | Swing | +2.9 | |

1996 Victorian state election: Geelong North
| Party | Candidate | Votes | % | ±% |
|---|---|---|---|---|
| Labor | Peter Loney | 18,042 | 58.1 | +5.9 |
| Liberal | Tony Ansett | 13,026 | 41.9 | +5.4 |
| Total formal votes | | 31,068 | 97.0 | +1.9 |
| Informal votes | | 961 | 3.0 | −1.9 |
| Turnout | | 32,029 | 95.4 | −0.4 |
| Labor hold | | Swing | −1.5 | |

1992 Victorian state election: Geelong North
| Party | Candidate | Votes | % | ±% |
|---|---|---|---|---|
| Labor | Peter Loney | 15,653 | 52.2 | −9.5 |
| Liberal | Jim Fidge | 10,965 | 36.6 | +2.9 |
| Geelong Community | Mae Dunstan | 3,360 | 11.2 | +11.2 |
| Total formal votes | | 29,978 | 95.1 | 0.0 |
| Informal votes | | 1,541 | 4.9 | 0.0 |
| Turnout | | 31,519 | 95.8 | |
Two-party-preferred result
| Labor | Peter Loney | 17,826 | 59.6 | −4.6 |
| Liberal | Jim Fidge | 12,102 | 40.4 | +4.6 |
| Labor hold | | Swing | −4.6 | |

=== Elections in the 1980s ===
1988 Victorian state election: Geelong North
| Party | Candidate | Votes | % | ±% |
|---|---|---|---|---|
| Labor | Neil Trezise | 16,802 | 61.61 | −4.14 |
| Liberal | Michael King | 9,230 | 33.84 | −0.41 |
| Call to Australia | Ernest Andrews | 1,240 | 4.55 | +4.55 |
| Total formal votes | | 27,272 | 94.81 | −1.80 |
| Informal votes | | 1,493 | 5.19 | +1.80 |
| Turnout | | 28,765 | 93.23 | −0.51 |
Two-party-preferred result
| Labor | Neil Trezise | 17,457 | 64.02 | −1.73 |
| Liberal | Michael King | 9,810 | 35.98 | +1.73 |
| Labor hold | | Swing | −1.73 | |

1985 Victorian state election: Geelong North
| Party | Candidate | Votes | % | ±% |
|---|---|---|---|---|
| Labor | Neil Trezise | 17,408 | 65.8 | −3.3 |
| Liberal | John Lucas | 9,068 | 34.2 | +3.3 |
| Total formal votes | | 26,476 | 96.6 | |
| Informal votes | | 929 | 3.4 | |
| Turnout | | 27,405 | 93.7 | |
| Labor hold | | Swing | −3.3 | |

1982 Victorian state election: Geelong North
| Party | Candidate | Votes | % | ±% |
|---|---|---|---|---|
| Labor | Neil Trezise | 18,831 | 68.1 | +2.9 |
| Liberal | Gregory Arrowsmith | 8,808 | 31.9 | −2.9 |
| Total formal votes | | 27,639 | 96.1 | +0.2 |
| Informal votes | | 1,117 | 3.9 | −0.2 |
| Turnout | | 28,756 | 94.8 | +0.9 |
| Labor hold | | Swing | +2.9 | |

=== Elections in the 1970s ===
1979 Victorian state election: Geelong North
| Party | Candidate | Votes | % | ±% |
|---|---|---|---|---|
| Labor | Neil Trezise | 16,645 | 65.2 | +2.6 |
| Liberal | John Dow | 8,870 | 34.8 | −2.6 |
| Total formal votes | | 25,515 | 95.9 | −0.9 |
| Informal votes | | 1,097 | 4.1 | +0.9 |
| Turnout | | 26,612 | 93.9 | +0.7 |
| Labor hold | | Swing | +2.6 | |

1976 Victorian state election: Geelong North
| Party | Candidate | Votes | % | ±% |
|---|---|---|---|---|
| Labor | Neil Trezise | 14,194 | 62.6 | +3.5 |
| Liberal | Stanley Yates | 8,464 | 37.4 | +5.2 |
| Total formal votes | | 22,658 | 96.8 | |
| Informal votes | | 759 | 3.2 | |
| Turnout | | 23,417 | 93.2 | |
| Labor hold | | Swing | +2.5 | |

1973 Victorian state election: Geelong North
| Party | Candidate | Votes | % | ±% |
|---|---|---|---|---|
| Labor | Neil Trezise | 15,489 | 59.4 | −0.3 |
| Liberal | David Roffey | 8,335 | 31.9 | +3.3 |
| Democratic Labor | James Jordan | 2,261 | 8.7 | −3.0 |
| Total formal votes | | 26,085 | 96.7 | −0.6 |
| Informal votes | | 877 | 3.3 | +0.6 |
| Turnout | | 26,962 | 93.9 | −1.2 |
Two-party-preferred result
| Labor | Neil Trezise | 15,828 | 60.7 | −0.8 |
| Liberal | David Roffey | 10,257 | 39.3 | +0.8 |
| Labor hold | | Swing | −0.8 | |

1970 Victorian state election: Geelong North
| Party | Candidate | Votes | % | ±% |
|---|---|---|---|---|
| Labor | Neil Trezise | 13,939 | 59.7 | +0.6 |
| Liberal | Graeme Hawkins | 6,678 | 28.6 | +0.4 |
| Democratic Labor | James Jordan | 2,725 | 11.7 | −1.0 |
| Total formal votes | | 22,703 | 97.3 | +0.2 |
| Informal votes | | 639 | 2.7 | −0.2 |
| Turnout | | 23,342 | 95.1 | +0.8 |
Two-party-preferred result
| Labor | Neil Trezise | 14,348 | 61.5 | +0.5 |
| Liberal | Graeme Hawkins | 8,994 | 38.5 | −0.5 |
| Labor hold | | Swing | +0.5 | |

=== Elections in the 1960s ===
1967 Victorian state election: Geelong North
| Party | Candidate | Votes | % | ±% |
|---|---|---|---|---|
| Labor | Neil Trezise | 12,746 | 59.1 | +9.4 |
| Liberal | Peter Lowe | 6,094 | 28.2 | −6.7 |
| Democratic Labor | William Bond | 2,740 | 12.7 | −2.8 |
| Total formal votes | | 21,580 | 97.1 | |
| Informal votes | | 651 | 2.9 | |
| Turnout | | 22,231 | 94.3 | |
Two-party-preferred result
| Labor | Neil Trezise | 13,157 | 61.0 | +9.4 |
| Liberal | Peter Lowe | 8,423 | 39.0 | −9.4 |
| Labor hold | | Swing | +9.4 | |
