= Results of the 1970 Victorian state election (Legislative Council) =

Australian state election results

Victorian state election, 30 May 1970 Legislative Council << 1967–1973 >>
Enrolled voters	1,827,595				
Votes cast	1,731,725		Turnout	94.8	+0.5
Informal votes	68,710		Informal	4.0	+0.3
Summary of votes by party
Party	Primary votes	%	Swing	Seats won	Seats held
Labor	698,213	42.0	+5.1	4	9
Liberal	625,739	37.6	–0.9	10	20
Democratic Labor	233,877	14.1	–0.2	0	0
Country	102,462	6.1	–3.4	4	7
Independent	2,724	0.2	–0.6	0	0
Total	1,663,015			18	36

This is a list of Legislative Council results for the Victorian 1970 state election. 18 of the 36 seats were contested.

== Results by province ==
=== Ballarat ===
1970 Victorian state election: Ballarat Province
Party	Candidate	Votes	%	±%
Liberal	Murray Byrne	27,013	47.8	+6.4
Labor	Jack Jones	22,349	39.6	+6.5
Democratic Labor	William Bruty	7,106	12.6	−2.1
Total formal votes		56,468	97.7	−0.5
Informal votes		1,313	2.3	+0.5
Turnout		57,781	95.9	−0.4
Two-party-preferred result
Liberal	Murray Byrne	33,568	59.5	−2.3
Labor	Jack Jones	22,900	40.5	+2.3
Liberal hold		Swing	−2.3	

=== Bendigo ===
1970 Victorian state election: Bendigo Province
Party	Candidate	Votes	%	±%
Labor	Stewart Anderson	27,702	47.0	+3.9
Liberal	Jock Granter	23,369	39.7	+9.8
Democratic Labor	William Drechsler	7,826	13.3	+1.2
Total formal votes		58,897	97.8	+0.3
Informal votes		1,349	2.2	−0.3
Turnout		60,246	95.3	+0.5
Two-party-preferred result
Liberal	Jock Granter	30,012	51.0	+0.9
Labor	Stewart Anderson	28,885	49.0	−0.9
Liberal hold		Swing	+0.9	

=== Boronia ===
1970 Victorian state election: Boronia Province
Party	Candidate	Votes	%	±%
Liberal	Vernon Hauser	61,198	43.7	−7.2
Labor	Niall Brennan	61,101	43.6	+7.6
Democratic Labor	Edmund Burgi	17,731	12.7	−0.5
Total formal votes		140,030	96.1	−1.0
Informal votes		5,588	3.9	+1.0
Turnout		145,618	95.7	+2.3
Two-party-preferred result
Liberal	Vernon Hauser	76,158	54.4	−8.3
Labor	Niall Brennan	63,872	45.6	+8.3
Liberal hold		Swing	−8.3	

=== Doutta Galla ===
1970 Victorian state election: Doutta Galla Province
Party	Candidate	Votes	%	±%
Labor	Dolph Eddy	60,974	54.7	+4.9
Liberal	William Pearce	33,348	29.9	−4.6
Democratic Labor	Hubert Evans	17,135	15.4	−0.3
Total formal votes		111,457	94.3	−0.3
Informal votes		6,786	5.7	+0.3
Turnout		118,243	93.7	+0.2
Two-party-preferred result
Labor	Dolph Eddy		56.2	+4.8
Liberal	William Pearce		43.8	−4.8
Labor hold		Swing	+4.8	

- Two party preferred vote was estimated.

=== East Yarra ===
1970 Victorian state election: East Yarra Province
Party	Candidate	Votes	%	±%
Liberal	Rupert Hamer	57,786	52.8	−4.1
Labor	Stanley Bannan	37,645	34.3	+5.5
Democratic Labor	John Rogers	14,083	12.9	−1.3
Total formal votes		109,514	96.9	−0.1
Informal votes		3,468	3.1	+0.1
Turnout		112,982	93.1	−0.3
Two-party-preferred result
Liberal	Rupert Hamer		64.4	−5.3
Labor	Stanley Bannan		35.6	+5.3
Liberal hold		Swing	−5.3	

- Two party preferred vote was estimated.

=== Gippsland ===
1970 Victorian state election: Gippsland Province
Party	Candidate	Votes	%	±%
Labor	Eric Kent	25,992	33.1	+3.9
Country	Arthur Hewson	21,037	26.8	−9.0
Liberal	Dick Long	20,758	26.4	+6.7
Democratic Labor	Gregory Answorth	10,839	13.8	−1.6
Total formal votes		78,626	96.8	−0.2
Informal votes		2,595	3.2	+0.2
Turnout		81,221	94.7	−0.1
Two-party-preferred result
Labor	Eric Kent	45,201	57.5	+22.9
Liberal	Dick Long	33,425	42.5	+42.5
Labor gain from Country		Swing	+22.9	

=== Higinbotham ===
1970 Victorian state election: Higinbotham Province
Party	Candidate	Votes	%	±%
Liberal	Murray Hamilton	53,258	47.5	−5.7
Labor	Anthony Balmer	44,599	39.7	+6.3
Democratic Labor	Frederick Skinner	14,378	12.8	−0.6
Total formal votes		112,235	97.0	−0.2
Informal votes		3,479	3.0	+0.2
Turnout		115,714	94.5	+0.5
Two-party-preferred result
Liberal	Murray Hamilton	66,302	59.1	−6.2
Labor	Anthony Balmer	45,933	40.9	+6.2
Liberal hold		Swing	−6.2	

=== Melbourne ===
1970 Victorian state election: Melbourne Province
Party	Candidate	Votes	%	±%
Labor	Jack O'Connell	48,201	50.6	−3.6
Liberal	Norman Long	29,617	31.1	+2.2
Democratic Labor	Gordon Haberman	17,462	18.3	+5.6
Total formal votes		95,280	93.4	−0.5
Informal votes		6,765	6.6	+0.5
Turnout		102,045	91.1	+0.8
Two-party-preferred result
Labor	Jack O'Connell		52.3	−5.3
Liberal	Norman Long		47.7	+5.3
Labor hold		Swing	−5.3	

- Two party preferred vote was estimated.

=== Melbourne North ===
1970 Victorian state election: Melbourne North Province
Party	Candidate	Votes	%	±%
Labor	John Walton	55,060	54.4	0.0
Liberal	Jean Baldwin	30,575	30.2	−0.9
Democratic Labor	Henry Darroch	15,608	15.4	+0.9
Total formal votes		101,243	94.5	+0.6
Informal votes		5,849	5.5	−0.6
Turnout		107,092	94.9	−0.3
Two-party-preferred result
Labor	John Walton		55.9	0.0
Liberal	Jean Baldwin		44.1	0.0
Labor hold		Swing	0.0	

- Two party preferred vote was estimated.

=== Melbourne West ===
1970 Victorian state election: Melbourne West Province
Party	Candidate	Votes	%	±%
Labor	Bunna Walsh	62,584	53.9	−4.0
Liberal	William McDonald	36,692	28.2	+7.1
Democratic Labor	Kenneth Berrie	20,865	18.0	−3.0
Total formal votes		120,141	93.8	−0.4
Informal votes		7,608	6.2	+0.4
Turnout		127,749	95.0	+1.1
Two-party-preferred result
Labor	Bunna Walsh		55.6	−4.4
Liberal	William McDonald		44.4	+4.4
Labor hold		Swing	−4.4	

- Two party preferred vote was estimated.

=== Monash ===
1970 Victorian state election: Monash Province
Party	Candidate	Votes	%	±%
Liberal	Graham Nicol	53,711	48.9	−3.3
Labor	Donald Reeves	38,220	34.8	+2.5
Democratic Labor	William Hoyne	15,137	13.8	−1.6
Independent	Reginald Murphy	2,724	2.5	+2.5
Total formal votes		109,792	96.5	0.0
Informal votes		4,661	3.5	0.0
Turnout		114,453	92.1	+0.8
Two-party-preferred result
Liberal	Graham Nicol	69,938	63.7	−1.6
Labor	Donald Reeves	39,854	36.3	+1.6
Liberal hold		Swing	−1.6	

=== Northern ===
1970 Victorian state election: Northern Province
Party	Candidate	Votes	%	±%
Country	Michael Clarke	23,672	42.8	−12.7
Liberal	Albert Baker	12,585	22.8	+4.7
Labor	Trevor Monti	12,201	22.1	+22.1
Democratic Labor	James Bourke	6,865	12.4	+1.7
Total formal votes		55,323	96.0	−0.5
Informal votes		2,284	4.0	+0.5
Turnout		57,607	96.3	−0.7
Two-candidate-preferred result
Country	Michael Clarke	35,813	64.7	
Liberal	Albert Baker	19,510	35.3	
Country hold		Swing	N/A	

=== North Eastern ===
1970 Victorian state election: North Eastern Province
Party	Candidate	Votes	%	±%
Country	Ivan Swinburne	21,704	42.8	−30.1
Labor	Colin Sutherland	12,718	25.2	+25.2
Liberal	George Ikinger	10,421	20.7	+6.2
Democratic Labor	Johannes Van Der Horst	5,587	12.4	−0.2
Total formal votes		50,430	96.4	−0.7
Informal votes		1,863	3.6	+0.7
Turnout		52,293	95.1	−0.2
Two-party-preferred result
Country	Ivan Swinburne	34,544	68.5	
Liberal	George Ikinger	15,886	31.5	
Country hold		Swing	N/A	

=== North Western ===
1970 Victorian state election: North Western Province
Party	Candidate	Votes	%	±%
Country	Bernie Dunn	18,749	42.6	−8.3
Labor	Pamela Fowler	11,825	26.9	+6.9
Liberal	Heather Mitchell	7,812	17.8	+0.8
Democratic Labor	Stanley Croughan	5,600	12.7	+0.6
Total formal votes		43,986	96.5	−0.4
Informal votes		1,599	3.5	+0.6
Turnout		45,585	96.0	+0.1
Two-party-preferred result
Country	Bernie Dunn	30,101	68.4	−2.9
Labor	Pamela Fowler	13,885	31.6	+2.9
Country hold		Swing	−2.9	

=== South Eastern ===
1970 Victorian state election: South Eastern Province
Party	Candidate	Votes	%	±%
Labor	Ian Cathie	64,291	46.8	+9.3
Liberal	Roy Ward	56,841	41.3	−8.6
Democratic Labor	John Launder	16,362	11.9	−0.7
Total formal votes		137,494	96.5	−0.2
Informal votes		4,970	3.5	+0.2
Turnout		142,464	94.9	0.0
Two-party-preferred result
Liberal	Roy Ward	69,995	50.9	−9.3
Labor	Ian Cathie	67,499	49.1	+9.3
Liberal hold		Swing	−9.3	

=== South Western ===
1970 Victorian state election: South Western Province
Party	Candidate	Votes	%	±%
Labor	Stanley Nash	35,619	40.2	+4.0
Liberal	Glyn Jenkins	34,396	38.9	−2.3
Democratic Labor	William Bond	12,746	14.4	−0.2
Country	Bartus De Groot	5,783	6.5	−1.5
Total formal votes		88,544	96.9	+0.4
Informal votes		2,864	3.1	−0.4
Turnout		91,408	95.6	+0.7
Two-party-preferred result
Liberal	Glyn Jenkins	48,524	54.8	−5.2
Labor	Stanley Nash	40,020	45.2	+5.2
Liberal hold		Swing	−5.2	

=== Templestowe ===
1970 Victorian state election: Templestowe Province
Party	Candidate	Votes	%	±%
Labor	Neville Telfer	59,093	43.3	+4.2
Liberal	Raymond Garrett	56,987	41.7	−5.1
Democratic Labor	Ernest Dobson	20,466	14.9	+0.7
Total formal votes		136,546	96.9	−0.2
Informal votes		4,349	3.1	+0.2
Turnout		140,895	94.9	+0.5
Two-party-preferred result
Liberal	Raymond Garrett	75,708	55.4	−3.9
Labor	Neville Telfer	60,838	44.6	+3.9
Liberal hold		Swing	−3.9	

=== Western ===
1970 Victorian state election: Western Province
Party	Candidate	Votes	%	±%
Liberal	Kenneth Gross	19,372	34.0	−3.1
Labor	Thomas Windsor	18,039	31.6	+4.8
Country	Linden Cameron	11,517	20.2	−2.2
Democratic Labor	Alan Beattie	8,081	14.2	+0.5
Total formal votes		57,009	97.7	+0.2
Informal votes		1,320	2.3	−0.2
Turnout		58,329	96.8	+0.1
Two-party-preferred result
Liberal	Kenneth Gross	31,271	54.9	−4.6
Labor	Thomas Windsor	25,738	45.1	+4.6
Liberal hold		Swing	−4.6	

== See also ==
- 1970 Victorian state election
- Candidates of the 1970 Victorian state election
- Members of the Victorian Legislative Council, 1970–1973
