= 1964 Victorian state election =

Australian state election

- 27 June 1964

All 66 seats in the Victorian Legislative Assembly and 17 (of the 34) seats in the Victorian Legislative Council 34 seats needed for a majority
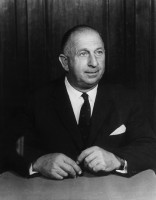

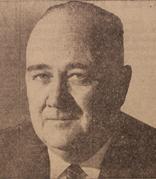

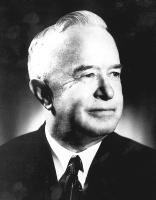
	First party	Second party	Third party
Leader	Henry Bolte	Clive Stoneham	Herbert Hyland
Party	Liberal and Country	Labor	Country
Leader since	3 June 1953	7 October 1958	20 April 1955
Leader's seat	Hampden	Midlands	Gippsland South
Last election	39	17	9
Seats won	38	18	10
Seat change	▼1	▲1	▲1
Popular vote	597,748	546,279	132,067
Percentage	39.63%	36.22%	8.76%
Swing	▲3.20	▼2.33	▲1.62
TPP	59.03%	40.97%
TPP swing	▲1.09	▼1.09
Premier before election
Henry Bolte
Liberal and Country
Premier after election
Henry Bolte
Liberal and Country

Elections were held in the Australian state of Victoria on 27 June 1964 to elect the 66 members of the state's Legislative Assembly and 17 members of the 34-member Legislative Council.

The Liberal and Country Party (LCP) government of Premier Henry Bolte won a fourth term in office.

== Key dates ==
Date	Event
6 May 1964	The Parliament was prorogued.
14 May 1964	Writs were issued by the Administrator to proceed with an election.
5 June 1964	Close of nominations.
27 June 1964	Polling day, between the hours of 8am and 6pm.
8 July 1964	The Bolte Ministry was reconstituted, with two new ministers sworn in.
14 July 1964	The writ was returned and the results formally declared.
14 July 1964	Parliament resumed for business.

== Results ==
=== Legislative Assembly ===
The election produced almost no change in the electoral balance.

Party	Votes	%	+/–	Seats	+/–
Liberal & Country	597,748	39.63	▲3.20	38	▼1
Labor	546,279	36.22	▼2.33	18	▲1
Democratic Labor	225,779	14.97	▼1.98	0	Steady
Country	132,067	8.76	▲1.62	10	▲1
Independents	2,533	0.17	▼0.49	0	▼1
Other	3,741	0.25	▼0.01	0	Steady
Total	1,508,147	100.00	–	66	–
Valid votes	1,508,147	97.69			
Invalid/blank votes	35,631	2.31	▼0.14		
Total votes	1,543,778	100.00	–		
Registered voters/turnout	1,635,311	94.40	▼0.01		
Two-party-preferred
Liberal	890,164	59.03	▲1.09		
Labor	617,873	40.97	▼1.09		
Total	1,508,037	100.00	–		

=== Legislative Council ===
Victorian state election, 27 June 1964 Legislative Council << 1961–1967 >>
Enrolled voters	1,635,311				
Votes cast	1,543,586		Turnout	94.4	–0.1
Informal votes	45,627		Informal	3.0	–0.2
Summary of votes by party
Party	Primary votes	%	Swing	Seats won	Seats held
Liberal and Country	600,600	40.1	+2.1	9	18
Labor	531,510	35.5	–3.4	4	8
Democratic Labor	232,445	15.5	–1.2	0	0
Country	133,403	8.9	+2.7	4	8
Total	1,497,958			17	34

== Seats changing hands ==
Seat	Pre-1964			Swing	Post-1964		
Seat	Party	Member	Margin	Swing	Margin	Member	Party
Bendigo	Labor	Bill Galvin	4.5	-6.3	1.8	Robert Trethewey	Liberal and Country
Geelong West	Liberal and Country	Max Gillett	0.2	-0.3	0.1	Neil Trezise	Labor
Kara Kara	Liberal and Country	Keith Turnbull	13.8	-15.1	1.3	Bill Phelan	Country
Moorabbin	Independent Liberal	Bob Suggett	8.7	N/A	11.0	Bob Suggett	Liberal and Country

- Members listed in italics did not recontest their seats.
- In addition, Labor retained the seat of Broadmeadows which it had won from the LCP at the 1962 by-election.

== Post-election pendulum ==
LCP seats (38)
Marginal
Bendigo	Robert Trethewey	LCP	1.8%
Lowan	Jim McCabe	LCP	1.8% v CP
Mentone	Edward Meagher	LCP	3.9%
Ballarat South	Bill Stephen	LCP	4.7%
Dandenong	Len Reid	LCP	5.6%
Morwell	Jim Balfour	LCP	5.6%
Fairly safe
Moonee Ponds	Jack Holden	LCP	6.0%
Hawthorn	Walter Jona	LCP	6.4%
Evelyn	Russell Stokes	LCP	6.7%
Essendon	Kenneth Wheeler	LCP	7.0%
Oakleigh	Alan Scanlan	LCP	7.5%
St Kilda	Brian Dixon	LCP	8.4%
Dundas	William McDonald	LCP	8.9%
Ripponlea	Edgar Tanner	LCP	9.6%
Safe
Geelong	Hayden Birrell	LCP	10.0%
Moorabbin	Bob Suggett	LCP	11.0%
Ivanhoe	Vernon Christie	LCP	11.4%
Scoresby	Bill Borthwick	LCP	11.6%
Ormond	Joe Rafferty	LCP	12.1%
Ringwood	Jim Manson	LCP	12.5%
Sandringham	Murray Porter	LCP	12.7%
Mulgrave	Ray Wiltshire	LCP	13.4%
Portland	George Gibbs	LCP	14.8%
Prahran	Sam Loxton	LCP	14.8%
Ballarat North	Tom Evans	LCP	15.6%
Box Hill	George Reid	LCP	17.8%
Toorak	Philip Hudson	LCP	18.3%
Caulfield	Alexander Fraser	LCP	18.4%
Mornington	Roberts Dunstan	LCP	19.5%
Camberwell	Vernon Wilcox	LCP	19.6%
Hampden	Henry Bolte	LCP	20.2%
Elsternwick	Richard Gainey	LCP	20.8%
Brighton	John Rossiter	LCP	22.0%
Polwarth	Tom Darcy	LCP	22.0%
Balwyn	Alex Taylor	LCP	22.6%
Kew	Arthur Rylah	LCP	22.6%
Burwood	Jim MacDonald	LCP	22.8%
Malvern	John Bloomfield	LCP	25.5%

Labor seats (18)
Marginal
Geelong West	Neil Trezise	ALP	0.1%
Broadmeadows	John Wilton	ALP	0.6%
Melbourne	Arthur Clarey	ALP	1.0%
Midlands	Clive Stoneham	ALP	1.1%
Brunswick West	Campbell Turnbull	ALP	5.5%
Fairly safe
Preston	Charlie Ring	ALP	8.5%
Northcote	Frank Wilkes	ALP	8.6%
Grant	Roy Crick	ALP	9.1%
Coburg	Charlie Mutton	ALP	9.7%
Flemington	Kevin Holland	ALP	9.8%
Albert Park	Keith Sutton	ALP	9.9%
Reservoir	Harry Jenkins	ALP	9.9%
Safe
Brunswick East	Leo Fennessy	ALP	10.7%
Richmond	Clyde Holding	ALP	16.0%
Fitzroy	Denis Lovegrove	ALP	17.0%
Yarraville	Roy Schintler	ALP	17.9%
Footscray	Bill Divers	ALP	18.9%
Williamstown	Larry Floyd	ALP	20.0%
Country seats (10)
Kara Kara	Bill Phelan	CP	1.3% v LCP
Rodney	Russell McDonald	CP	12.1% v LCP
Benalla	Tom Trewin	CP	12.5% v LCP
Murray Valley	George Moss	CP	13.5% v LCP
Gippsland West	Leslie Cochrane	CP	14.6% v LCP
Gippsland East	Bruce Evans	CP	16.9% v LCP
Mildura	Milton Whiting	CP	17.4%
Benambra	Tom Mitchell	CP	25.4%
Gippsland South	Herbert Hyland	CP	27.6% v DLP
Swan Hill	Harold Stirling	CP	28.7%

== See also ==
- Candidates of the 1964 Victorian state election
- Members of the Victorian Legislative Assembly, 1961–1964
- Members of the Victorian Legislative Assembly, 1964–1967
- Bolte Ministry
