= Robert Lawson (Victorian politician) =

Australian politician (born 1927)

Robert Lawson Victorian Legislative Council MP
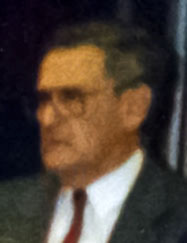

Member of the Victorian Parliament for Higinbotham Province
- In office 1979 – 3 October 1992
- Preceded by: Sir William Fry
- Succeeded by: Chris Strong

Personal details
- Born: 18 May 1927 Melbourne
- Died: 12 July 2024 (aged 97)
- Party: Liberal Party
- Spouse: Nancy Eunice Curtis (m. 1949)
- Children: 5

Robert Lawson (18 May 1927 – 12 July 2024) was an Australian politician.

== Life and career ==
Lawson was born on 19 May 1927 in Melbourne, to Leonard Langworthy Lawson, a builder, and Alice Dorothy. He attended local state schools and became the managing director of Lawsons Pty Ltd.

He joined the Liberal Party in 1950, and was elected to the Victorian Legislative Council in 1979 as a member for Higinbotham. He held the seat until his retirement in 1992, the year Liberal Party won government at the Victorian state election.

Lawson married charity worker Nancy Curtis in 1949. She died from pancreatic cancer in November 2009, at the age of 82.

Lawson died on 12 July 2024, aged 97.

Victorian Legislative Council
Preceded by Sir William Fry	Member for Higinbotham; 1979–1992; Served alongside: Murray Hamilton; Geoffrey Connard	Succeeded by Chris Strong
