= 1970 Victorian state election =

Australian state election

- 30 May 1970

All 73 seats in the Victorian Legislative Assembly and 18 (of the 36) seats in the Victorian Legislative Council 37 seats needed for a majority
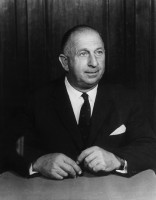

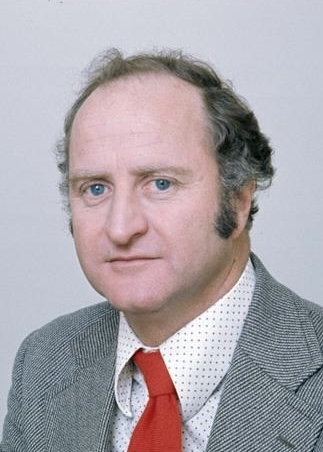

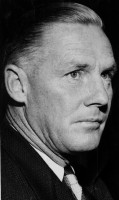
	First party	Second party	Third party
Leader	Sir Henry Bolte	Clyde Holding	George Moss
Party	Liberal	Labor	Country
Leader since	3 June 1953	15 May 1967	8 July 1964
Leader's seat	Hampden	Richmond	Murray Valley
Last election	44	16	12
Seats won	42	22	8
Seat change	▼2	▲6	▼4
Popular vote	614,094	693,105	107,011
Percentage	36.70%	41.42%	6.40%
Swing	▼0.79	▲3.52	▼2.25
TPP	54.15%	45.85%
TPP swing	▼4.21	▲4.21
- Results in each electorate.
Premier before election
Henry Bolte
Liberal
Elected Premier
Henry Bolte
Liberal

The 1970 Victorian state election, held on Saturday, 30 May 1970, was for the 45th Parliament of Victoria. It was held in the Australian state of Victoria to elect the 73 members of the state's Legislative Assembly and 18 members of the 36-member Legislative Council.

The incumbent Liberal government led by Henry Bolte was returned for a sixth term with a slightly reduced majority.

== Results ==
=== Legislative Assembly ===
Party	Votes	%	+/–	Seats	+/–
Labor	693,105	41.42	▲3.52	22	▲6
Liberal	614,094	36.70	▼0.79	42	▼2
Democratic Labor	222,591	13.30	▼0.99	0	Steady
Country	107,011	6.40	▼2.25	8	▼4
Defence of Government Schools	7,663	0.46	New	0	Steady
Independents	28,758	1.72	▲0.14	1	Steady
Total	1,673,222	100.00	–	73	–
Valid votes	1,673,222	96.81			
Invalid/blank votes	55,141	3.19	▲0.03		
Total votes	1,728,363	100.00	–		
Registered voters/turnout	1,827,595	94.57	▲0.30		
Two-party-preferred
Liberal	905,987	54.15	▼4.21		
Labor	767,055	45.85	▲4.21		
Total	1,673,042	100.00	–		

=== Legislative Council ===
Victorian state election, 30 May 1970 Legislative Council << 1967–1973 >>
Enrolled voters	1,827,595				
Votes cast	1,731,725		Turnout	94.8	+0.5
Informal votes	68,710		Informal	4.0	+0.3
Summary of votes by party
Party	Primary votes	%	Swing	Seats won	Seats held
Labor	698,213	42.0	+5.1	4	9
Liberal	625,739	37.6	–0.9	10	20
Democratic Labor	233,877	14.1	–0.2	0	0
Country	102,462	6.1	–3.4	4	7
Independent	2,724	0.2	–0.6	0	0
Total	1,663,015			18	36

== Seats changing hands ==
Seat	Pre-1970			Swing	Post-1970		
Seat	Party	Member	Margin	Swing	Margin	Member	Party
Dundas	Liberal	William McDonald	2.0	-5.6	3.6	Edward Lewis	Labor
Gippsland South	Country	Herbert Hyland	28.4	-34.7	6.3	James Taylor	Liberal
Gippsland West	Country	Leslie Cochrane	13.4	-16.0	2.6	Rob Maclellan	Liberal
Greensborough	Liberal	Monte Vale	3.3	-5.3	2.0	Bob Fell	Labor
Kara Kara	Country	Bill Phelan	12.6	-17.8	5.2	Esmond Curnow	Labor
Lowan	Country	Ray Buckley	2.7	-8.8	6.1	Jim McCabe	Liberal
Morwell	Liberal	Archie Tanner	1.3	-9.2	7.9	Derek Amos	Labor
Portland	Liberal	Don McKellar	3.6	-6.4	2.8	Bill Lewis	Labor

- Members listed in italics did not recontest their seats.
- In addition, Labor retained the seat of Dandenong, which was won at a by-election.

== Post-election pendulum ==
Liberal seats (42)
Marginal
Heatherton	Norman Billing	LIB	0.4%
Polwarth	Cec Burgin	LIB	0.4% v CP
Essendon	Kenneth Wheeler	LIB	0.7%
Narracan	Jim Balfour	LIB	0.8%
Mitcham	Dorothy Goble	LIB	2.3%
Bendigo	Robert Trethewey	LIB	2.4%
Gippsland West	Rob Maclellan	LIB	2.6%
Evelyn	Russell Stokes	LIB	3.9%
Ivanhoe	Vernon Christie	LIB	4.6%
Prahran	Sam Loxton	LIB	5.0%
Bennettswood	Ian McLaren	LIB	5.2%
Mentone	Bill Templeton	LIB	5.2%
St Kilda	Brian Dixon	LIB	5.9%
Fairly safe
Ballarat South	Bill Stephen	LIB	6.1%
Glenhuntly	Joe Rafferty	LIB	6.1%
Lowan	Jim McCabe	LIB	6.1% v CP
Scoresby	Geoff Hayes	LIB	6.1%
Gippsland South	James Taylor	LIB	6.3% v CP
Bellarine	Aurel Smith	LIB	6.6%
Hawthorn	Walter Jona	LIB	6.6%
Monbulk	Bill Borthwick	LIB	6.7%
Ringwood	Jim Manson	LIB	6.8%
Moorabbin	Llew Reese	LIB	7.3%
Geelong	Hayden Birrell	LIB	8.0%
Syndal	Ray Wiltshire	LIB	8.4%
Oakleigh	Alan Scanlan	LIB	8.6%
Bentleigh	Bob Suggett	LIB	8.7%
Warrnambool	Ian Smith	LIB	8.8%
Kew	Arthur Rylah	LIB	9.4%
Frankston	Edward Meagher	LIB	9.5%
Gisborne	Julian Doyle	LIB	9.8%
Safe
Sandringham	Max Crellin	LIB	10.1%
Box Hill	George Reid	LIB	11.0%
Caulfield	Edgar Tanner	LIB	12.9%
Glen Iris	Jim MacDonald	LIB	13.5%
Ballarat North	Tom Evans	LIB	13.8%
Dromana	Roberts Dunstan	LIB	14.1%
Camberwell	Vernon Wilcox	LIB	15.1%
Brighton	John Rossiter	LIB	15.6%
Hampden	Henry Bolte	LIB	15.8%
Balwyn	Alex Taylor	LIB	15.9%
Malvern	Lindsay Thompson	LIB	19.2%

Labor seats (22)
Marginal
Greensborough	Bob Fell	ALP	2.0%
Midlands	Les Shilton	ALP	2.8%
Portland	Bill Lewis	ALP	2.8%
Brunswick West	Campbell Turnbull	ALP	3.4%
Dandenong	Alan Lind	ALP	3.4%
Dundas	Edward Lewis	ALP	3.6%
Moonee Ponds	Tom Edmunds	ALP	4.8%
Kara Kara	Esmond Curnow	ALP	5.2%
Fairly safe
Preston	Carl Kirkwood	ALP	7.1%
Deer Park	Jack Ginifer	ALP	7.5%
Morwell	Derek Amos	ALP	7.9%
Reservoir	Jim Simmonds	ALP	8.0%
Albert Park	Val Doube	ALP	9.8%
Safe
Broadmeadows	John Wilton	ALP	11.0%
Northcote	Frank Wilkes	ALP	11.0%
Geelong North	Neil Trezise	ALP	11.5%
Brunswick East	David Bornstein	ALP	12.6%
Melbourne	Arthur Clarey	ALP	12.6%
Footscray	Robert Fordham	ALP	13.3%
Sunshine	Denis Lovegrove	ALP	13.3%
Williamstown	Larry Floyd	ALP	15.8%
Richmond	Clyde Holding	ALP	18.3%
Country seats (8)
Shepparton	Peter Ross-Edwards	CP	1.0% v IND
Benalla	Tom Trewin	CP	4.3% v LIB
Mildura	Milton Whiting	CP	5.6%
Murray Valley	George Moss	CP	11.8% v LIB
Gippsland East	Bruce Evans	CP	15.1% v LIB
Swan Hill	Henry Broad	CP	15.6% v LIB
Benambra	Tom Mitchell	CP	20.8%
Rodney	Russell McDonald	CP	26.2%
Crossbench seats (1)
Coburg	Jack Mutton	IND	8.8 v ALP

== See also ==
- Candidates of the 1970 Victorian state election
