= Warracknabeal Secondary College =

Location
- 5 Werrigar Street; Wimmera; Warracknabeal, Victoria, 3393; Australia

Information
- Type: Government, co-educational, day school
- Established: 1924
- Sister school: Warracknabeal Primary School, Warracknabeal Special Development School
- School number: 8430
- Principal: Casey Phelan
- Years offered: 7–12
- Gender: Mixed Gender Education
- Houses: Henty, Borung, Wimmera
- Colours: Navy blue, Maroon, Gold
- Website: warracksc.vic.edu.au

Warracknabeal Secondary College is an Australian high school in Warracknabeal, Victoria.

== History ==
In October 1923, the Education Department approved the establishment of a high school at Warracknabeal, provided that the community "contribute £630 in three years". Later that month the department of Education approved the site on which the new high school was to be built.

The Ballarat Star noted the establishment of Warracknabeal High School at the beginning of 1924, and the school submitted its first annual report at the end of that year. The school websites "History" page states the same opening year.

== Curriculum ==
Years 7–9 are based on AusVELS. Year 7 and 8 students study art, technology subjects (wood, metal, and food), media, and Japanese. Elective subjects begin in Year 9. VCE may begin in Year 10 in order to "increase subject options for students". However, Warracknabeal's Year 12 class may be as small as only two students. Therefore, the school supports virtual VCE classes and distance education. Students may also enter VCAL and VET programs (operated in Horsham).

As of 2016, on the completion of their secondary education, around 58% of students will enter the workforce. Around 35% of students will continue their education at university, while around 7% will go into TAFE programs.

== Extracurricular activities ==
The school offers private music classes for various instruments as well as sporting activities.

== Houses ==
The school has three houses.

- Henty – the Henty Highway travels through the town
- Wimmera – named for the Wimmera region in North-Western Victoria in which the school sits
- Borung – named for the Borung County

== Principals ==
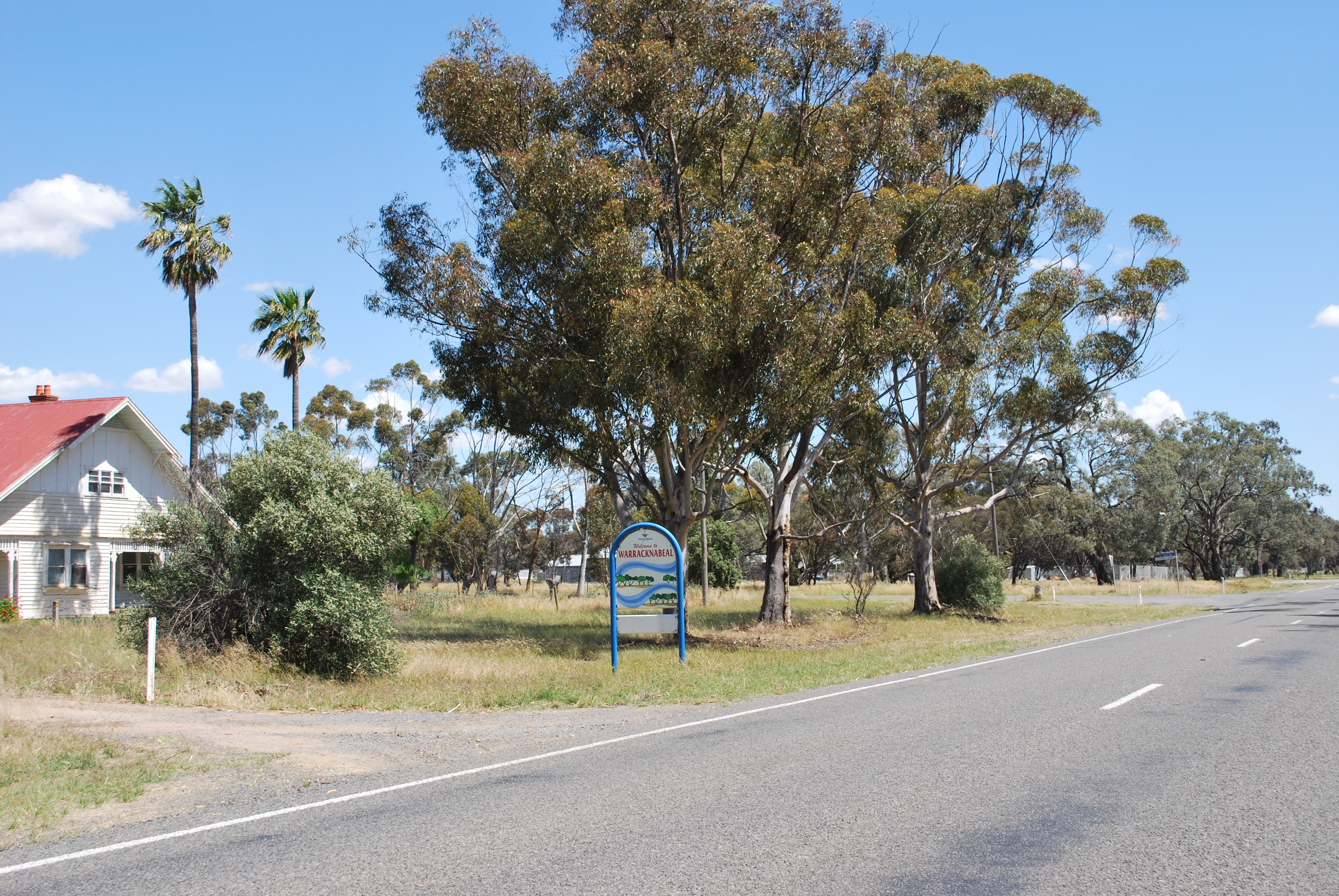
The Warracknabeal sign upon entrance to the town

Period	Name
1924–1933	F. Gallagher
1934–1938	A. House
1939–1951	E. N. Downe
1952–1955	A. L. Weaving
1956–1960	E. T. D. Graham
1961–1976	T. M. Palmer
1977–1982	B. A. Schache
1983–1994	A. J. Mansfield
1995–2007	Leo J. Casey
2007–2015	Anthony J. Fowler
2015–2018	Michael Briggs-Miller
2019-2022	Therese Allen
2022–Present	Casey Phelan

== Notable alumni ==
- Linden Cameron MC (1918–1986), Australian army officer
- Lauren Hewitt, Olympic track and field medalist
- Matt Rosa, AFL Footballer
- Chloe Bibby, WNBA (Indiana Fever)

== See also ==
- List of schools in Victoria
- List of high schools in Victoria
