= Colin MacDonald (politician) =

Australian politician

Colin Douglas MacDonald (24 August 1890 – 2 September 1975) was an Australian politician.

He was born in Balmain in Sydney to cabinet maker Colin MacDonald and Ellen Trinder. He was educated in Geelong but left school at the age of eleven to become a painter and later a tram driver. Around 1915 he married Alice May Hillier, with whom he had two sons. In 1955 he was elected to the Victorian Legislative Assembly as the Labor member for Geelong West, but he was defeated in 1958. MacDonald died in Geelong in 1975.

Victorian Legislative Assembly
New seat	Member for Geelong West; 1955–1958	Succeeded by Max Gillett
