= Electoral district of Lara =

State electoral district of Victoria, Australia

Lara Victoria—Legislative Assembly
- Interactive map of electoral district boundaries from the 2022 state election
- State: Victoria
- Created: 2002
- MP: Ella George
- Party: Labor Party
- Namesake: Lara, Victoria
- Electors: 47,026 (2018)
- Area: 702 km^{2} (271.0 sq mi)
- Demographic: Mixed urban and rural
Electorates around Lara:
Eureka	Eureka	Eureka
Eureka	Lara	Werribee
Geelong	Port Phillip Bay	Port Phillip Bay

Lara is a seat in the Victorian Legislative Assembly. It covers much of the area between the western suburbs of Melbourne and the regional city of Geelong. Most of the voters come from the very northern suburbs of Geelong, including Lara, Bell Post Hill and Corio. The district also includes the country towns of Anakie, Balliang and Little River but these add very few voters to the district.

The electorate was created at the 2002 state election, replacing the abolished Geelong North. A safe Labor seat like its predecessor, it was easily won by Peter Loney, formerly the MP for Geelong North. Loney faced a preselection challenge ahead of the 2006 election from upper house member John Eren, whose seat was being abolished as part of sweeping government reforms to the chamber. Facing certain defeat at the hands of the factionally connected Eren, Loney chose to retire. Eren faced little challenge in the general election, and was easily returned as the new member for Lara.

== Members for Lara ==
Member	Party	Term
Peter Loney	Labor	2002–2006
John Eren	Labor	2006–2022
Ella George	Labor	2022–present

== Election results ==
2022 Victorian state election: Lara
Party	Candidate	Votes	%	±%
Labor	Ella George	19,635	49.7	−8.2
Liberal	Ralph Krein	8,460	21.4	−2.7
Greens	Courtney Gardner	4,473	11.3	+3.8
Family First	Steve Rankine	1,775	4.5	+4.5
Liberal Democrats	Max Payne	1,688	4.3	+4.3
Animal Justice	Peter Kelly	1,502	3.8	−3.1
Ind. (Socialist Alliance)	Sarah Hathway	1,050	2.6	+2.6
Angry Victorians	Ash Taylor	938	2.4	+2.4
Total formal votes		39,512	93.7	–0.4
Informal votes		2,677	6.3	+0.4
Turnout		42,189	86.2	–1.5
Two-party-preferred result
Labor	Ella George	26,027	65.9	−3.3
Liberal	Ralph Krein	13,485	34.1	+3.3
Labor hold		Swing	−3.3	
