= Frank Sheehan (Australian politician) =

Australian politician (1937–2021)

Frank Sheehan OAM

Member of the Victorian Legislative Assembly for Ballarat South
- In office 3 April 1982 – 2 October 1992
- Preceded by: Joan Chambers
- Succeeded by: District abolished

Personal details
- Born: 17 August 1937 Ballarat, Victoria, Australia
- Died: 5 May 2021 (aged 83) Ballarat, Victoria, Australia
- Party: Labor
- Spouse: Rosalie Moroney (m. 1966)
- Education: University of Melbourne
- Occupation: Motor trades instructor

Francis Patrick Sheehan OAM (17 August 1937 – 5 May 2021) was an Australian politician and community advocate from Ballarat.

Sheehan was born in Ballarat to farmer Cornelius Joseph Sheehan and Kathleen Veronica O'Donohue. He attended local Catholic schools and became a motor trades instructor, with a Trained Trade Instructors Certificate and Diploma of Technical Education from Hawthorn State College. From 1964 to 1966 he was national president of Young Christian Workers; in 1967 he joined the Labor Party.

In 1982 Sheehan was elected to the Victorian Legislative Assembly as the member for Ballarat South. He served until 1992, when his seat was abolished and he was defeated in Ballarat East.

After losing his seat he continued working for the Overseas Service Bureau (now Australian Volunteers International). He was active in the Ballarat Diocesan Ecological Sustainability Group. Sheehan was also an outspoken advocate for victims of historical sexual abuse within the Catholic Church, founding the Moving Towards Justice support group.

In 2018 Sheehan was awarded the Medal of the Order of Australia for his service to the Ballarat community, he cited the creation of workplace laws as one of his greatest achievements.

Sheehan died in May 2021, aged 83.

Victorian Legislative Assembly
Preceded by Joan Chambers	Member for Ballarat South; 1982–1992	Abolished
