= Noel Pullen =

Australian politician (1944–2024)

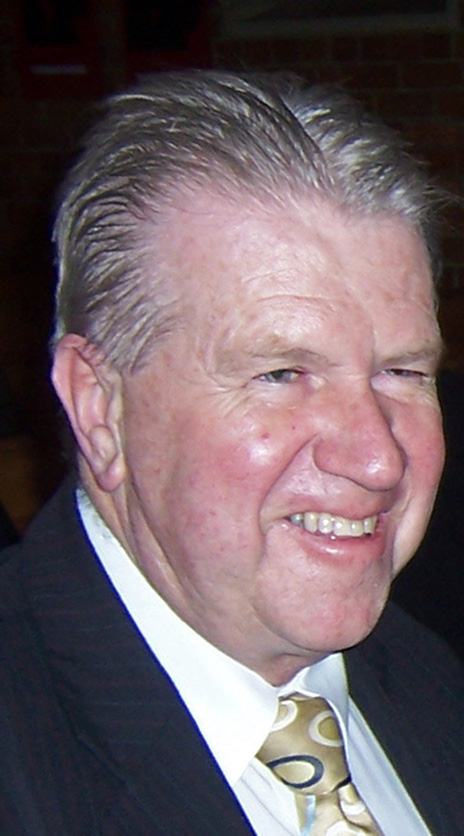
- Pullen in 2006

Personal details
- Born: 9 December 1944 Melbourne, Victoria, Australia
- Died: 23 August 2024 (aged 79)
- Party: Labor Party

Noel Pullen (9 December 1944 – 23 August 2024) was an Australian politician who was a member of the Victorian Legislative Council for the Australian Labor Party (ALP). Prior to becoming an MP, Pullen was a banker and was an Essendon Football Club supporter.

== Life and career ==
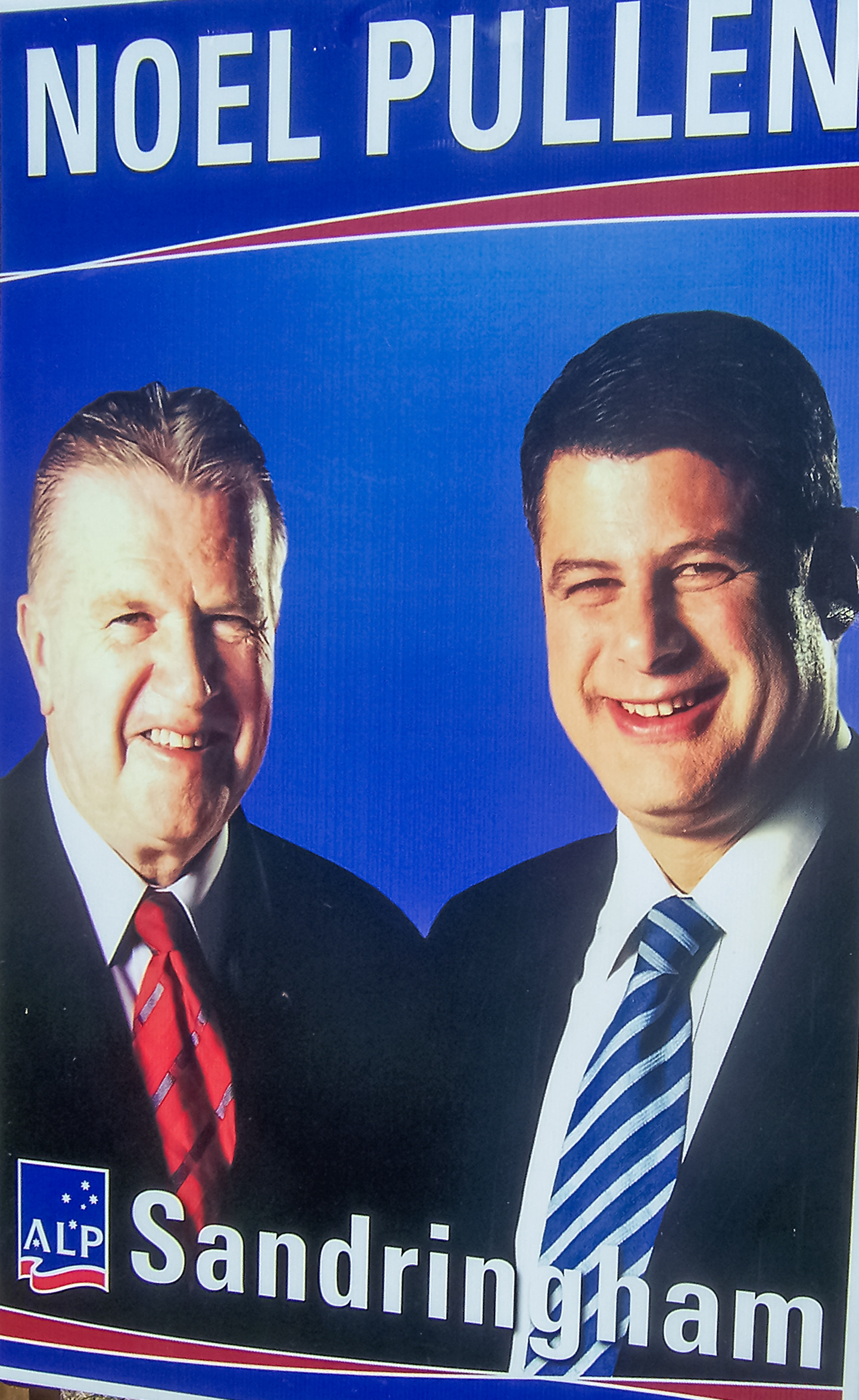
Pullen featured with then Victorian Premier Steve Bracks on a campaign sign in 2006 state election

Pullen was the only ALP representative ever elected to the seat of Higinbotham before it was abolished under the Legislative Council reforms carried out by the Bracks Labor government. During 2004, Pullen conducted a review related to the idea the Bracks Government had of introducing laws requiring car makers to offer an exchange vehicle or refund if a new car turned out to be a dud requiring repeated repairs to correct serious manufacturing defects. https://www.abc.net.au/news/2008-08-19/new-abortion-laws-introduced/482202 Pullen was not preselected for the new South Eastern Metropolitan Region of the Legislative Council for the 2006 state election, and instead chose to run against Liberal MP Murray Thompson in the Legislative Assembly seat of Sandringham. Pullen failed to be elected.

When the Bracks government intended to make legalising abortion a policy at the 2006 Victorian state election, Pullen supported an amendment proposed by Christine Campbell to consider the effects of late-term abortion. This was before abortion was legalised to birth in Victoria in 2008 by the Brumby government, John Brumby who replaced Steve Bracks as Premier of Victoria in 2007. Pullen died on 23 August 2024, at the age of 79. His funeral was held at St Joan of Arcs Church in Brighton Victoria. https://tobinbrothers.com.au/tribute/noel-pullen-2406566/
