= Ella George =

Australian politician

Member of the Victorian Legislative Assembly for Lara
- Incumbent
- Assumed office 26 November 2022
- Preceded by: John Eren

Personal details
- Political party: Labor

Ella George is an Australian politician who is the current member for the district of Lara in the Victorian Legislative Assembly. She is a member of the Labor Party and was elected in the 2022 state election, after replacing retiring MLA John Eren.
