= William Fry (Victorian politician) =

Australian politician (1909–2000)

Sir William Fry

13th President of the Victorian Legislative Council
- In office 29 June 1976 – 18 July 1979
- Preceded by: Sir Raymond Garrett
- Succeeded by: Fred Grimwade

Member of the Victorian Legislative Council for Higinbotham Province
- In office 29 April 1967 – 4 May 1979 Serving with Murray Hamilton
- Preceded by: Baron Snider
- Succeeded by: Robert Lawson

Personal details
- Born: William Gordon Fry; 12 June 1909 Ballarat, Victoria, Australia
- Died: 29 September 2000 (aged 91) Richmond, Victoria, Australia
- Party: Liberal
- Spouse: Lilian Gwendoline Macrae (m. 1936)
- Children: 4

Military service
- Allegiance: Australia
- Branch/service: Australian Army
- Years of service: 1940–1946
- Rank: Lieutenant colonel
- Commands: 47th Battalion

Sir William Gordon Fry (12 June 1909 – 29 September 2000) was an Australian politician.

He was born in Ballarat to engineer Alfred Gordon Fry and Edith Elizabeth Andrews. He attended state schools at Ballarat before studying at Melbourne University and becoming a schoolteacher. On 19 September 1936 he married Lilian Gwendoline Macrae, with whom he had four sons.

From 1940 to 1945 he served in the Australian Imperial Force, commanding the 47th Battalion in New Guinea and the Solomon Islands. He attained the rank of lieutenant-colonel and was mentioned in dispatches, and subsequently headed a commission investigating war crimes in the Pacific.

On his return he taught at Camperdown State School from 1946 to 1956, and was subsequently headmaster of Cheltenham, Windsor and Cheltenham Heights state schools.

He had joined the Liberal Party in 1947, and from 1963 to 1972 served on Moorabbin City Council; he was mayor from 1968 to 1969. In 1967 he was elected to the Victorian Legislative Council for Higinbotham Province. He was elected President of the Council in 1976, and retired from politics in 1979; he was knighted the following year, by which time he was living in Beaumaris.

Fry died at Richmond in 2000.

The Sir William Fry Reserve is an area of parkland named after him in 1985. It is located near the intersection of Nepean Highway and Bay Road in the Melbourne suburb of Highett.

Victorian Legislative Council
Preceded by Sir Raymond Garrett	President of the Victorian Legislative Council; 1976–1979	Succeeded by Fred Grimwade
Preceded by Baron Snider	Member for Higinbotham; 1967–1979; Served alongside: Murray Hamilton	Succeeded by Robert Lawson
