= John Eren =

Australian politician (born 1964)

The Honourable John Eren MP
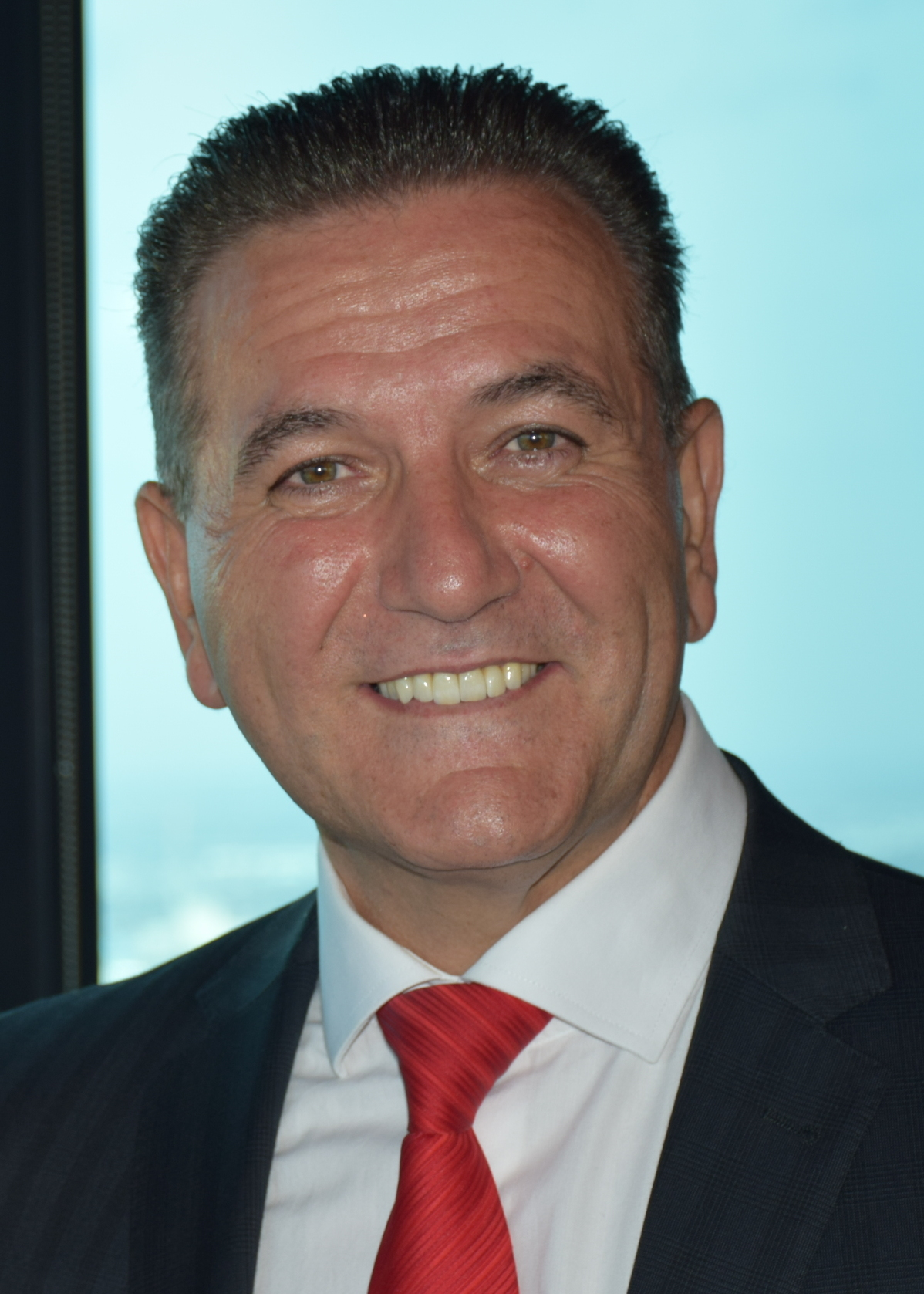

Member of the Victorian Legislative Assembly for Lara
- In office 25 November 2006 – 26 November 2022
- Preceded by: Peter Loney
- Majority: Ella George

Personal details
- Born: 15 March 1964 (age 62) İzmir, Turkey
- Party: Labor Party
- Spouse: Geraldine Eren
- Profession: Politician

John Hamdi Eren (born 15 March 1964) is an Australian former politician. He was a Labor Party member of the Parliament of Victoria from 2002 to 2022, representing Geelong Province in the Legislative Council from 2002 to 2006, and Lara in the Legislative Assembly from 2006 to 2022. Eren was the Minister for Tourism and Major Events, Minister for Sport and Minister for Veterans' Affairs in the First Andrews Ministry between 2014 and 2018.

== Early years ==
Eren was born in İzmir, Turkey. He came to Australia with his family (Father was a skilled migrant; fitter and turner) in 1970 and studied at a high school in the northern suburbs of Melbourne. Prior to entering Parliament, Eren worked in a variety of fields with the most prominent being on the assembly line at Ford in Geelong. At 21, Eren became the shop steward at Ford for the Vehicle Builders Union representing workers on the shop floor.

After Eren's time at Ford he was an electorate officer for Kelvin Thomson the Federal Member for Wills for over five years. Eren was elected as the State Member for Geelong Province in 2002.

== Political career ==
Eren was elected to the Legislative Council from 2002 to 2006 representing the Geelong Province. In 2006 he was elected to the Legislative Assembly as the Member for Lara and re-elected in 2010. In his first term in Parliament, John was a member of the Road Safety Committee and become the chair from 2007 to 2010. Eren has been a part of other committees including the Rural and Regional Committee and the Scrutiny of Acts and Regulations Committee. In 2011 Eren was elevated as the parliamentary secretary to the Deputy Leader of the Opposition. Eren was Minister for Tourism and Major Events, Minister for Sport and Minister for Veterans' Affairs in the First Andrews Ministry, but was not included in the Second Andrews Ministry since 2018.

Victorian Legislative Council
Preceded by Ian Cover	Member for Geelong Province; 2002–2006	Province abolished
Victorian Legislative Assembly
Preceded by Peter Loney	Member for Lara; 2006–2022	Incumbent
Political offices
Preceded by Louise Asher	Minister for Tourism and Major Events; 2014–2018	Succeeded by Martin Pakula
Preceded by Damian Drum	Minister for Sport; 2014–2018	Succeeded by Martin Pakula
Preceded by Damian Drum	Minister for Veterans' Affairs; 2014–2018	Succeeded by Robin Scott
