= Joan Chambers =

Australian politician (1930–2016)

Joan Heywood Chambers, née Murray (18 March 1930 – 29 August 2016) was an Australian politician.

Chambers was born in Elsternwick to company manager James McNab Murray and Annie Hale Shaw. She attended Ormond State School and Tintern Church of England Girls Grammar School before receiving a Bachelor of Arts (1950) and Diploma of Education (1951) from the University of Melbourne. She became a secondary schoolteacher at Kyabram in 1952, at Hampton in 1953, at Mortlake from 1968 to 1977 and at Ballarat from 1978 to 1979 and from 1982. On 21 November 1953, she married Major John Alexander Chambers, a soldier-turned-farmer; they had six children. Chambers joined the Liberal Party in 1969 and held a number of positions including secretary of the Alfredton branch (1978–81), a member of the federal electorate council for the Division of Wannon, and a member of the state executive (1977–78). In 1979, she was elected to the Victorian Legislative Assembly as the member for Ballarat South, but she was defeated in 1982. She unsuccessfully sought preselection for Warrnambool in 1983, and ran again for Ballarat South in 1988, losing narrowly and taking the result to the Court of Disputed Returns. She was an unsuccessful independent candidate for Ballarat West in 1992.

Victorian Legislative Assembly
Preceded by Bill Stephen	Member for Ballarat South; 1979–1982	Succeeded by Frank Sheehan
