= Gordon Scott (politician) =

Australian politician

Gordon Lincoln Scott (28 August 1908 – 28 August 1965) was an Australian politician.

He was born in Ballarat to baker John Scott and Elizabeth Rowe Hutton. He attended Ballarat College and became a baker, and subsequently an estate agent. On 16 April 1932 he married Jessie Margaret Symons, who would later be the first female mayor of Ballarat; they had three children. He was a member of Ballarat City Council from 1951 to 1961, and served as mayor from 1958 to 1959. In 1955 he was elected to the Victorian Legislative Assembly as the Liberal and Country Party member for Ballarat South. He served until his retirement in 1964. Scott died in Ballarat in 1965.

Victorian Legislative Assembly
New seat	Member for Ballarat South; 1955–1964	Succeeded by Bill Stephen
