= Arthur Warner =

English-born Australian businessman and politician

Sir Arthur George Warner KBE (31 July 1899 – 3 April 1966) was an English-born Australian businessman and politician.

He was born in London to manager Arthur Warner and Emily Cheeseman. He attended Sir George Monoux Grammar School and worked as a telephone mechanic before studying science at the University of London. During World War I he served in the Royal Navy and the Royal Flying Corps, and following the war he migrated to Australia and became a soldier settler in Scottsdale in Tasmania. He soon moved to Melbourne and, having qualified by correspondence, worked as an accountant. On 14 August 1920, he married Ethel Wakefield, with whom he had two sons.

From 1926, he ran the Radio Corporation which, by 1934, was the largest radio manufacturing firm in the country. In 1934, he applied for the first Australian television licence. In 1938, he founded Electronic Industries Ltd, which, as the manufacturer of the Astor range of products, dominated Australia's radio market in the 1930s.

In 1946, he was elected to the Victorian Legislative Council for Higinbotham Province, as an Independent Liberal, defeating the official Liberal Party candidate. He joined the Liberal Party soon after and, in 1947, was appointed Minister of Housing and Materials. He added the State Development Portfolio from 1948 to 1949, and Electrical Undertakings from 1949 to 1950, when the Liberal government was defeated. From 1951, he led the Liberals in the Legislative Council and was a supporter of Henry Bolte, as opposed to Thomas Hollway, in the party's leadership instability of the time.

When the Liberals were returned to government under Bolte in 1955, Warner was Minister of Transport until his resignation from the front bench in 1962. Created a Knight Bachelor in 1956, he was elevated to Knight Commander of the Order of the British Empire in 1962. Warner retired from politics in 1964 and died at Seymour in 1966.

He is the father of Peter Warner, the captain of a fishing boat who, in 1966, rescued six Tongan castaways on ʻAta Island, and later went on to win the line honours three times in the Sydney to Hobart yacht race.

Victorian Legislative Council
Preceded by James Disney	Member for Higinbotham; 1946–1964; Served alongside: James Kennedy; Lindsay Thompson	Succeeded by Baron Snider
