= Murray Hamilton (politician) =

Australian politician

Colonel Murray Hamilton ED

Member of the Victorian Legislative Council for Higinbotham
- In office May 1967 – June 1982 Serving with William Fry and Robert Lawson
- Preceded by: Lindsay Thompson
- Succeeded by: Geoffrey Connard

Personal details
- Born: 17 March 1918 Wonthaggi, Victoria
- Died: 17 May 2009 (aged 91)
- Party: Liberal Party
- Education: University of Melbourne (BComm)

Military service
- Allegiance: Australia
- Branch/service: Second Australian Imperial Force (1940–45); Citizen Military Forces (1948–68)
- Years of service: 1940–1945; 1948–1968
- Rank: Colonel
- Battles/wars: Second World War
- Awards: Efficiency Decoration; Mentioned in Despatches

Harold Murray Hamilton, ED (17 March 1918 – 17 May 2009) was an Australian politician.

Hamilton was born in Wonthaggi, Victoria, to Anglican minister Karl E. Hamilton and Alice Marion Trewartha. He was educated at Maffra, Orbost and Caulfield Grammar School, before studying at the University of Melbourne, graduating with a Bachelor of Commerce in 1948. From 1936 he worked for the Bank of New South Wales, and in 1940 he enlisted in the Second Australian Imperial Force. He served in the 2/2nd Pioneer Battalion until 1941, when he was transferred to the headquarters of the 20th Infantry Brigade. From 1944 he served with the 2/3rd Pioneer Battalion in the Middle East and New Guinea, winning promotion to major, being mentioned in despatches, and being awarded the Efficiency Decoration. After the war he remained in the Citizen Military Forces until 1968, achieving the rank of colonel. In 1953 he established an accountancy business at Dandenong, and later worked for a steel importing firm until 1963, when he entered an accountancy practice in Melbourne. In 1967 he won a by-election for the Victorian Legislative Council seat of Higinbotham, representing the Liberal Party. He held the seat until his resignation in 1982.

Hamilton married Judyth Margaret Thomas on 19 January 1968, with whom he had two children. After leaving politics he returned to accountancy. Hamilton died in 2009.

Victorian Legislative Council
Preceded by Lindsay Thompson	Member for Higinbotham; 1967–1982; Served alongside: William Fry and Robert Lawson	Succeeded by Geoffrey Connard
