= Linden Cameron =

Australian Army officer (1918–1986)

Linden Arthur Cameron
- Born: 17 March 1918; Warracknabeal, Victoria
- Died: 19 March 1986 (aged 68); Dunkeld, Victoria
- Military career
- Allegiance: Commonwealth of Australia
- Branch: Australian Army
- Service years: 1939–1948
- Rank: Captain
- Units: 2/5th Battalion (1939–1945): World War II; North Africa campaign; Battle of Greece; Syria-Lebanon campaign; New Guinea campaign; Aitape-Wewak campaign
- Awards: Military Cross & Bar

Linden Arthur Cameron MC & Bar (17 March 1918 – 19 March 1986) was an Australian army officer and farmer.

Cameron was born at Warracknabeal to farmer Finlay Cameron (later a member of the Victorian Legislative Assembly) and Victoria May Cameron, née Marshman. He attended Brim East State and Warracknabeal High schools before entering the public service as a taxation clerk on 7 March 1938. He studied from 1938 to 1939 at the University of Melbourne.

Cameron joined the militia forces (citizens) in December 1937. He enlisted in the Australian Imperial Force on 3 November 1939, being posted to the 2/5th Battalion. He was sent to the Middle East in April 1940 and trained in Cairo until his commission as a lieutenant on 30 March 1941. He was put in command of anti-aircraft defences on the transport ship City of London, which evacuated his battalion from Greece, in April, and then served as a platoon commander in Syria in June and July. Cameron's battalion left the Middle East in March 1942, returning to Australia in August before being sent to Papua in October.

In January 1943 the 2/5th was transported to Wau, New Guinea, and Cameron's platoon captured a ridge from the Japanese during the advance to Crystal Creek, earning Cameron the Military Cross. He was promoted captain in March. Cameron was wounded in July leading an attack on Mount Tambu, and did not return to his battalion until February 1944, by which time they had returned to Queensland. Cameron married Daphne Alice Grayling, a schoolteacher, on 29 July that year at the Methodist Church in Kaniva, Victoria.

In November 1944 Cameron's battalion was sent to Aitape; on 3 January 1945 Cameron's company was sent to clear an enemy ridge. Cameron's inspiring capture and defence of the position earned him a Bar to his Military Cross. When he returned to Australia in October he was assigned to the Directorate of Recruiting and Demobilization at Army Headquarters in Melbourne, and his appointment was terminated on 28 July 1948.

Cameron established a sheep farm at Dunkeld after the war and became active in the Victorian Farmers' Union. He contested four Legislative Council elections for the Country Party from 1964 to 1976, and stood as an independent Country candidate in several federal contests. In 1986, he died suddenly of myocardial infarction at his farm, two weeks prior to a planned trip overseas back to Egypt & Europe. He was cremated in Ballarat after a funeral service at the Dunkeld Uniting Church.
