= Chris Strong =

Christopher Arthur Strong (born 12 October 1941) is a former Australian politician.

Born in Brisbane, Queensland, he attended public schools at Rosebud in Victoria before becoming an Associate in Civil Engineering in 1964 (RMIT). From 1970 to 1983 he was a Project Management Consultant, and he held a senior management position with SECV from 1983 to 1992. He was a Brighton City Councillor 1975–78, and had a long history in the Liberal Party.

== Political career ==
On 3 October 1992, Strong was elected to the Victorian Legislative Council as a Liberal member for Higinbotham Province. He remained on the backbench for his entire political career. With the rearrangement of the Legislative Council in 2006, he lost Liberal preselection and retired. Strong in the Victorian Parliament once discussed a fist fight at the Brighton baths which involved Brighton Mayor John Locco and Baths manager Mark Greene. Strong is thought to have supported Louse Asher over Mitch Fifield for Brighton pre selection. Strong once stated that some victims do not obey the rules of court.
