= Max Gillett =

Australian politician

Robert Max Gillett (23 July 1927 – 24 October 2011) was an Australian politician.

He was born in Geelong, the son of farmer R. A. Gillett. He attended Geelong College and became a small business owner. In 1956 he became a farmer, and on 18 February 1956 he married Elizabeth Margot Simmons, with whom he had four children. On 31 May 1958 he was elected to the Victorian Legislative Assembly as the Liberal and Country Party member for Geelong West. He served until his defeat in 1964. Gillett returned to farming after politics and died in Geelong in 2011.

Victorian Legislative Assembly
Preceded by Colin MacDonald	Member for Geelong West; 1958–1964	Succeeded by Neil Trezise
