= Peter Loney =

Australian politician

Peter James Loney (born 3 February 1948 in Daylesford, Victoria) was an Australian politician. He was an Australian Labor Party member of the Victorian Legislative Assembly from 1992 to 2006, representing the electorates of Geelong North (1992–2002) and its successor Lara (2002–2006). He also served as Deputy Speaker of the Legislative Assembly.

Loney began his political career in 1992 as a shadow minister before serving on the Victorian Parliament's Public Accounts and Estimates Committee in 1997–2003. He was chair of the committee from 1999 to 2003 and chair of the Australasian Council of Work Accounts Committees from 2001 to 2003. He was also chair of La Trobe University's Public Sector Governance and Accountability Research Centre Advisory Council.

Loney retired before the 2006 state election. He had been facing a serious preselection challenge from MLC John Eren, whose seat of Geelong Province had been abolished by parliamentary reforms; Eren subsequently succeeded him in the seat.
