= Geoffrey Connard =

Australian politician (1925–2013)

Geoffrey Connard

Geoffrey Philip Connard AM (13 October 1925 – 27 January 2013) was the member for Higinbotham Province in the Parliament of Victoria, Australia from 1982 to 1996.

He played a crucial role in a number of Victorian, Australian and International health reforms and continued to work in the health sector following his retirement from parliamentary life.

His support was crucial to the passing of the legislation establishing VicHealth.

Geoffrey was inaugural chair of the Macfarlane Burnet Centre from 1986 to 1990 and was a member of the Burnet Institute Board until 2007.

He was chairman of the International Diabetes Institute from 1997 to 2000. In a tribute, the successor Baker IDI Heart and Diabetes Institute wrote, "As a Chairman of the former International Diabetes Institute, he worked tirelessly to ensure the Institute was a leading national and international centre for diabetes research, education and care."

== Honours ==
His honours included: Member of the Order of Australia in 2001; the Distinguished Service Medal, Pharmacy Guild of Australia in 1996; and he was a Knight of St John of Jerusalem, Knights Hospitaller.

In 2012, Monash University established The Honourable Geoffrey Connard AM travelling scholarship and award to young postdoctoral staff members or postgraduate students to pursue pharmacy research interest overseas.

== Community activity ==
He was very active in other community organisations including:

- Pharmacy Guild of Australia District No 1: honorary secretary 1965–81, board member 1974.
- After Care Hospital: honorary treasurer to 1984 and chairman 1985–88, board member and vice chairman 1994–96.
- St George's Hospital and Inner Eastern Geriatric Centre: board member 1982–96, chairman1987-90.
- Fairfield Infectious Diseases Hospital: board member 1982–96, Chairman1987-90.
- Peter MacCallum Cancer Institute: treasurer from 2000 to 2002.
- Travellers Aid Society of Victoria, president and long-term advisor.
- Leon Mow Charitable Trust: trustee from 1998.
- Australia Day Council: executive member from 1976.
- Victoria Day Council
- Australia Free China Association vice president from 1980.
- Brighton Historical Society
- Beaumaris Conservation Society].
- Sandringham Yacht Club.
- Lions Club of Mordialloc: member from 1964.

== Personal life ==
Geoffrey Connard was educated at Mordialloc State School, Mordialloc High School, Melbourne Grammar, and the Victorian College of Pharmacy. in 1957, he married the painter Judith Wills. They had three children: Jane, Phillip and Timothy. He worked as a pharmacist until his election to the Victorian Parliament in 1982.
