= Higinbotham Province =

Former electoral province of the Victorian Legislative Council, Australia

Higinbotham Victoria—Legislative Council
- State: Victoria
- Created: 1937
- Abolished: 2006
- Area: 108 km^{2} (41.7 sq mi)
- Demographic: Metropolitan

Higinbotham Province was an electorate of the Victorian Legislative Council. It existed as a two-member electorate from 1937 to 2006, with members serving alternating eight-year terms. It was considered a safe seat for the Liberal throughout its history, though it was won by Labor candidate Noel Pullen in Labor's landslide victory at the 2002 state election. It was abolished from the 2006 state election in the wake of the Bracks Labor government's reform of the Legislative Council.

It was located in the south-east of Melbourne. In 2002, when it was last contested, it covered an area of 108 km^{2} and included the suburbs of Bentleigh, Black Rock, Brighton, Cheltenham, Mentone, Moorabbin, Mordialloc and Sandringham.

== Members for Higinbotham Province ==
Member 1	Party	Year		
James Kennedy	United Australia	1937	Member 2	Party
James Kennedy	United Australia	1940	James Disney	United Australia
James Kennedy	United Australia	1943	James Disney	United Australia
James Kennedy	Liberal	1945	James Disney	Liberal
James Kennedy	Liberal	1946	Arthur Warner	Liberal
James Kennedy	Liberal and Country	1949	Arthur Warner	Liberal and Country
James Kennedy	Liberal and Country	1949	Arthur Warner	Liberal and Country
James Kennedy	Liberal and Country	1952	Arthur Warner	Liberal and Country
Lindsay Thompson	Liberal and Country	1954	Arthur Warner	Liberal and Country
Lindsay Thompson	Liberal and Country	1955	Arthur Warner	Liberal and Country
Lindsay Thompson	Liberal and Country	1958	Arthur Warner	Liberal and Country
Lindsay Thompson	Liberal and Country	1961	Arthur Warner	Liberal and Country
Lindsay Thompson	Liberal and Country	1964	Baron Snider	Liberal and Country
Lindsay Thompson	Liberal	1965	Baron Snider	Liberal
Lindsay Thompson	Liberal	1967	Murray Hamilton	Liberal
William Fry	Liberal	1967	Murray Hamilton	Liberal
William Fry	Liberal	1970	Murray Hamilton	Liberal
William Fry	Liberal	1973	Murray Hamilton	Liberal
William Fry	Liberal	1976	Murray Hamilton	Liberal
Robert Lawson	Liberal	1979	Murray Hamilton	Liberal
Robert Lawson	Liberal	1982	Geoffrey Connard	Liberal
Robert Lawson	Liberal	1985	Geoffrey Connard	Liberal
Robert Lawson	Liberal	1988	Geoffrey Connard	Liberal
Chris Strong	Liberal	1992	Geoffrey Connard	Liberal
Chris Strong	Liberal	1996	John Ross	Liberal
Chris Strong	Liberal	1999	John Ross	Liberal
Chris Strong	Liberal	2002	Noel Pullen	Labor

== Election results ==
2002 Victorian state election: Higinbotham Province
Party	Candidate	Votes	%	±%
Liberal	Michael Heffernan	60,580	45.7	−10.1
Labor	Noel Pullen	52,445	39.6	+36.9
Greens	Tony McDermott	16,451	12.4	+12.4
Democrats	Derek Wilson	2,952	2.2	−39.1
Total formal votes		132,428	97.2	+0.3
Informal votes		3,845	2.8	−0.3
Turnout		136,273	92.7	
Two-party-preferred result
Labor	Noel Pullen	66,711	50.4	+6.5
Liberal	Michael Heffernan	65,717	49.6	−6.5
Labor gain from Liberal		Swing	+6.5	
