= Electoral district of Geelong West =

Coordinates: 38°08′30″S 144°19′40″E

Geelong West Victoria—Legislative Assembly
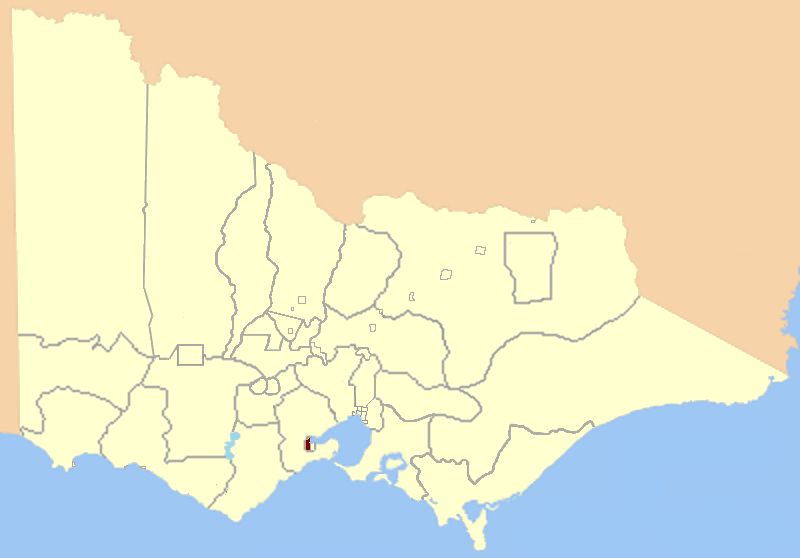
- Location in Victoria, 1859
- State: Victoria
- Dates current: 1859–1877, 1955–1985
- Demographic: Metropolitan

Geelong West was an electoral district of the Legislative Assembly in the Australian state of Victoria from 1859 to 1985. It was located west of the city of Geelong, defined in the Victorian Electoral Act, 1858 as:

Bounded on the north and north-west by a line drawn at a distance of 2 miles from the north-western angle of the town reserve of Geelong, as a centre from the western shore of Corio Bay, near Cowie's Creek, to a road leading to the River Barwon; on the west by that road; on the south-west and south by the River Barwon; and on the east by the western boundary of the town reserve of Geelong and the shores of Corio Bay, including the reserve at the junction of the Barwon and Moorabool.

Geelong West (along with Electoral district of Geelong East) was created when the four-member Electoral district of Geelong was abolished in 1859. Geelong West and Geelong East were abolished in 1877, replaced by a re-created 3-member district of Geelong. Geelong West was re-created in 1955.

== Members ==
First incarnation (1859–1877, 2 members)
Member 1	Term	Member 2	Term
John Henry Brooke	1859 – 1864	James Harrison	1859 – 1860
John Henry Brooke	1859 – 1864	Nicholas Foott	1860^{[b]} – 1868^{[d]}
George Brown	1864 – 1865	Nicholas Foott	1860^{[b]} – 1868^{[d]}
Richard Heath	1866 – 1867	Nicholas Foott	1860^{[b]} – 1868^{[d]}
James Gattie Carr	1868 – 1870	Graham Berry	1868^{[b]} – 1877
Robert de Bruce Johnstone	1870^{[b]} – 1877	Graham Berry	1868^{[b]} – 1877

^{[d]} Foott died 24 September 1868, replaced by Graham Berry in October 1868.
Johnstone and Berry went on to represent the re-created Geelong from 1877.

Second incarnation (1955–1967)
Member	Party	Term
Colin MacDonald	Labor	1955–1958
Max Gillett	Liberal and Country	1958–1964
Neil Trezise	Labor	1964–1967

Third incarnation (1976–1985)
Member	Party	Term
Hayden Birrell	Liberal	1976–1982
Hayden Shell	Labor	1982–1985
