= Baron Snider =

Australian politician

Baron David Snider (12 September 1917 – 29 December 1966) was an Australian politician.

Born in Caulfield to theatre proprietor Mendel Snider and Evelyn Myers, Snider attended Melbourne Grammar School and Melbourne University, and during World War II served in the Australian Military Forces. In 1940 he went to the United States to consult on ship building safety; while there he married Emily Frank, with whom he had a son Mark Garfield. In 1951 he returned to Australia, becoming a director of training for the Victorian Institute of Industrial Management. In 1955 he was elected to the Victorian Legislative Assembly as the Liberal and Country Party member for St Kilda. In 1964 he transferred to the Legislative Council, winning a seat in Higinbotham Province. He had married Claire Orson in 1959; they had one son Marshall Orson. Snider died in 1966 at Ivanhoe.

Victorian Legislative Assembly
Preceded by John Bourke	Member for St Kilda; 1955–1964	Succeeded by Brian Dixon
Victorian Legislative Council
Preceded by Sir Arthur Warner	Member for Higinbotham; 1964–1966; Served alongside: Lindsay Thompson	Succeeded by William Fry
