= Electoral district of Geelong North =

Coordinates: 38°08′S 144°20′E

Geelong North Victoria—Legislative Assembly
- State: Victoria
- Created: 1967
- Abolished: 2002
- Demographic: Metropolitan

The Electoral district of Geelong North was an electoral district of the Victorian Legislative Assembly. It was largely replaced by the district of Lara in the redistribution before the 2002 election.

== Members of Geelong North ==
Member	Party	Term
Neil Trezise	Labor	1967–1992
Peter Loney	Labor	1992–2002

== See also ==
- Parliaments of the Australian states and territories
- List of members of the Victorian Legislative Assembly
