= Electoral district of Ballarat South =

Former state electoral district of Victoria, Australia

Ballarat South Victoria—Legislative Assembly
- State: Victoria
- Created: 1955
- Abolished: 1992
- Demographic: Rural
- Coordinates: 37°35′00″S 143°51′45″E

Ballarat South was an electoral district of the Legislative Assembly in the Australian state of Victoria. It was created in the redistribution preceding the 1955 election, covering the southern suburbs and the rural areas south of Ballarat.

It was a marginal seat that was always won by the governing party throughout its existence.

Ballarat South was abolished in the redistribution preceding the 1992 election, and was mostly replaced by the new district of Ballarat East.

== Members for Ballarat South ==
Member	Party	Term
Gordon Scott	Liberal and Country	1955–1964
Bill Stephen	Liberal and Country	1964–1965
Bill Stephen	Liberal	1965–1979
Joan Chambers	Liberal	1979–1982
Frank Sheehan	Labor	1982–1992
