= Bill Stephen (politician) =

Australian politician

William Francis Stephen AM (23 July 1921 – 5 April 2013) was an Australian politician.

Stephen was born in Fremantle in Western Australia to blacksmith William Stephen and Vera May Pyke. He attended local state schools and became a timber worker and locomotive engineman before serving in the Royal Australian Air Force from 1942 to 1946. He was a traffic officer from 1946 to 1947 and a dairy farmer in 1948 before moving to Pakenham, where he was the foreman at a food factory from 1950 to 1952. In 1953 he was granted land at Meredith as a soldier settler, and he became a small seeds producer. He was active in the local Primary Producers' Union and in the local Liberal Party.

In 1964 Stephen was elected to the Victorian Legislative Assembly for Ballarat South. From 1973 he was Acting Speaker and Temporary Chairman of Committees, a position he held until his retirement in 1979. He remained active in the local community and was appointed a Member of the Order of Australia in 1999. Stephen died at East Melbourne in 2013.

Victorian Legislative Assembly
Preceded by Gordon Scott	Member for Ballarat South; 1964–1979	Succeeded by Joan Chambers
