= Neil Trezise =

Australian politician

Personal information
- Born: 8 February 1931; Ballarat, Victoria
- Died: 20 August 2006 (aged 75)
- Original team: Redan
- Debut: 16 July 1949, Geelong vs. Footscray, at Kardinia Park
- Height: 5 ft 7 in (170 cm)
- Weight: 11 st 5 lb (72 kg)

Playing career^{1}
Years	Club	Games (Goals)
1949–1959	Geelong	185 (272)

Coaching career
Years	Club	Games (W–L–D)
1963	Geelong	1 (0–1–0)
- ^{1} Playing statistics correct to the end of 1959.

Career highlights
- Geelong premiership sides 1951, 1952

Neil Benjamin "Nipper" Trezise AM (8 February 1931 – 20 August 2006) was an Australian rules footballer who represented Geelong in the Victorian Football League and later a politician who represented the Labor Party in the Victorian Legislative Assembly. He was of Cornish descent.

== Football career ==
Originally from Redan, Victoria, Trezise played 185 games for 272 goals between 1949 and 1959 at the Geelong Football Club in the VFL. He played in the 1951 and 1952 premiership sides, and in the second round of 1953 kicked eight goals against a champion Footscray defence, who would concede fewer points per match than any other team between 1919 and 2019. Following his retirement in 1959 (a year in which he was Geelong captain), Trezise continued his service to the club, coaching the reserves side, (Note: On 6 July 1963, on the single occasion that he coached the Geelong First XVIII, he was the coach of the team that were comprehensively and unexpectedly beaten by Fitzroy, 9.13 (67) to 3.13 (31) in the 1963 Miracle Match.) and then becoming club president in 1974.

Commonly called "Nipper", Trezise acquired the nickname as a young recruit at Geelong.

== Political career ==
After leaving football, Trezise pursued a political career with the Labor Party. He stood unsuccessfully for the Victorian Legislative Assembly seat of Geelong in 1961, but won the seat of Geelong West in 1964, and held the seat and its subsequent successor Geelong North until 1992. In 1982 he became Minister for Youth, Sport and Recreation (from 1985 just Minister for Sport and Recreation), a portfolio he held until 1992—throughout the entire terms of Premiers John Cain and Joan Kirner.

Trezise was made a Member of the Order of Australia (AM) in the 1993 Queen's Birthday Honours for "service to the Victorian Parliament and to sport".

His son, Ian Trezise, also entered politics, representing Geelong in the Victorian Legislative Assembly.

== Death ==
Trezise died of a heart attack on 20 August 2006, with his funeral held on 24 August.

== Notes ==
Victorian Legislative Assembly
Preceded by Max Gillett	Member for Geelong West; 1964–1967	District abolished
District created	Member for Geelong North; 1967–1992	Succeeded by Peter Loney
Political offices
Preceded by Brian Dixon	Minister for Youth, Sport and Recreation; 1982–1985	Youth portfolio abolished
Youth portfolio abolished	Minister for Sport and Recreation; 1985–1992	Succeeded by Tom Reynolds
