= Electoral results for the district of Footscray =

Victoria, Australia, district election results

This is a list of electoral results for the Electoral district of Footscray in Victorian state elections.

== Members for Footscray ==
First incarnation (1877–1904)
Member	Party	Term
Mark Last King	Unaligned	1877–1879
William Clark	Unaligned	1879–1894
John Hancock	Labor	1894–1899
Samuel Mauger	Independent	1900–1901
Jacob Fotheringham	Liberal	1901–1902
Alexander McDonald	Liberal	1902–1904
Second incarnation (1927–present)
Member	Party	Term
George Prendergast	Labor	1927–1937
Jack Mullens	Labor	1937–1945
Jack Holland	Labor	1945–1955
Roy Schintler	Labor	1955–1958
Ernie Shepherd	Labor	1958
Bill Divers	Labor	1958–1970
Robert Fordham	Labor	1970–1992
Bruce Mildenhall	Labor	1992–2006
Marsha Thomson	Labor	2006–2018
Katie Hall	Labor	2018–present

== Election results ==
=== Elections in the 2020s ===
2022 Victorian state election: Footscray
Party	Candidate	Votes	%	±%
Labor	Katie Hall	17,387	43.10	−11.70
Greens	Elena Pereyra	9,045	22.42	+2.22
Liberal	Emete Joesika	7,214	17.88	+0.78
Victorian Socialists	Jorge Jorquera	3,769	9.34	+9.34
Democratic Labour	Alan Williams	1,098	2.72	+2.72
Animal Justice	Shohre Mansouri Jajaee	989	2.45	−3.55
Family First	Russell Muir	838	2.08	+2.08
Total formal votes		40,340	96.06	+2.10
Informal votes		1,654	3.94	−2.10
Turnout		41,994	85.95	−0.27
Notional two-party-preferred count
Labor	Katie Hall	30,523	75.66	−3.04
Liberal	Emete Joesika	9,817	24.34	+3.04
Two-candidate-preferred result
Labor	Katie Hall	21,880	54.24	−24.46
Greens	Elena Pereyra	18,460	45.76	+45.76
Labor hold		Swing	N/A	

=== Elections in the 2010s ===
2018 Victorian state election: Footscray
Party	Candidate	Votes	%	±%
Labor	Katie Hall	23,877	57.12	+11.98
Liberal	Emete Joesika	7,753	18.55	−8.18
Greens	Angus McAlpine	6,996	16.74	−0.46
Animal Justice	Shan Sun	3,177	7.60	+7.60
Total formal votes		41,803	93.96	−0.17
Informal votes		2,686	6.04	+0.17
Turnout		44,489	86.22	−3.32
Two-party-preferred result
Labor	Katie Hall	32,642	78.11	+13.62
Liberal	Emete Joesika	9,147	21.89	−13.62
Labor hold		Swing	+13.62	

2014 Victorian state election: Footscray
Party	Candidate	Votes	%	±%
Labor	Marsha Thomson	17,542	45.1	−1.4
Liberal	Kim Vu	10,386	26.7	+1.9
Greens	Rod Swift	6,682	17.2	−0.6
Independent	Catherine Cumming	2,985	7.7	+0.5
Voice for the West	Ken Betts	1,272	3.3	+3.3
Total formal votes		38,867	94.1	+0.3
Informal votes		2,422	5.9	−0.3
Turnout		41,289	89.5	+2.2
Two-party-preferred result
Labor	Marsha Thomson	25,065	64.5	−1.4
Liberal	Kim Vu	13,802	35.5	+1.4
Labor hold		Swing	−1.4	

2010 Victorian state election: Footscray
Party	Candidate	Votes	%	±%
Labor	Marsha Thomson	14,611	42.61	−9.88
Liberal	Ken Betts	8,703	25.38	+8.67
Greens	Janet Rice	7,126	20.78	+8.67
Independent	Catherine Cumming	3,240	9.45	−5.45
Socialist Alliance	Margarita Windisch	614	1.79	+0.33
Total formal votes		34,294	94.52	+1.37
Informal votes		1,989	5.48	−1.37
Turnout		36,283	90.06	−0.27
Two-party-preferred result
Labor	Marsha Thomson	22,637	66.26	−8.41
Liberal	Ken Betts	11,529	33.74	+8.41
Labor hold		Swing	−8.41	

=== Elections in the 2000s ===
2006 Victorian state election: Footscray
Party	Candidate	Votes	%	±%
Labor	Marsha Thomson	16,471	52.49	−6.82
Liberal	Cam Nation	5,244	16.71	+1.74
Independent	Catherine Cumming	4,675	14.90	+4.51
Greens	Greg Ferrington	3,799	12.11	+1.96
Family First	Ron Berchy	734	2.34	+2.34
Socialist Alliance	Margarita Windisch	457	1.46	−1.25
Total formal votes		31,380	93.15	−0.20
Informal votes		2,306	6.85	+0.20
Turnout		33,686	90.33	+0.58
Two-party-preferred result
Labor	Marsha Thomson	23,428	74.67	−0.23
Liberal	Cam Nation	7,948	25.33	+0.23
Labor hold		Swing	−0.23	

2002 Victorian state election: Footscray
Party	Candidate	Votes	%	±%
Labor	Bruce Mildenhall	18,589	59.3	−7.5
Liberal	Conrad D'Souza	4,691	15.0	−17.0
Independent	Catherine Cumming	3,255	10.4	+10.4
Greens	Janet Rice	3,181	10.1	+10.1
Socialist Alliance	Justine Kamprad	848	2.7	+2.7
Independent	Martin Nguyen	778	2.5	+2.5
Total formal votes		31,342	93.3	−1.8
Informal votes		2,234	6.7	+1.8
Turnout		33,576	89.7	
Two-party-preferred result
Labor	Bruce Mildenhall	23,444	74.8	+7.0
Liberal	Conrad D'Souza	7,878	25.2	−7.0
Labor hold		Swing	+7.0	

=== Elections in the 1990s ===
1999 Victorian state election: Footscray
Party	Candidate	Votes	%	±%
Labor	Bruce Mildenhall	19,916	67.6	−0.4
Liberal	Dina Lynch	9,533	32.4	+2.6
Total formal votes		29,449	95.1	−0.7
Informal votes		1,503	4.9	+0.7
Turnout		30,952	90.6	
Labor hold		Swing	−1.8	

1996 Victorian state election: Footscray
Party	Candidate	Votes	%	±%
Labor	Bruce Mildenhall	19,770	68.0	+10.2
Liberal	David Sisson	8,661	29.8	+3.0
Natural Law	James Ryan	625	2.2	+2.2
Total formal votes		29,056	95.8	+3.1
Informal votes		1,261	4.2	−3.1
Turnout		30,317	91.1	
Two-party-preferred result
Labor	Bruce Mildenhall	20,142	69.4	+3.2
Liberal	David Sisson	8,897	30.6	−3.2
Labor hold		Swing	+3.2	

1992 Victorian state election: Footscray
Party	Candidate	Votes	%	±%
Labor	Bruce Mildenhall	16,408	57.9	−9.5
Liberal	Chris MacGregor	7,606	26.8	+1.0
Independent	Libby Krepp	2,123	7.5	+7.5
Independent	Hans Paas	1,060	3.7	+3.7
Independent	David Connolly	680	2.4	+2.4
Independent	Colleen Hartland	486	1.7	+1.7
Total formal votes		28,363	92.8	+0.8
Informal votes		2,207	7.2	−0.8
Turnout		30,570	93.7	
Two-party-preferred result
Labor	Bruce Mildenhall	18,719	66.2	−6.1
Liberal	Chris MacGregor	9,562	33.8	+6.1
Labor hold		Swing	−6.1	

=== Elections in the 1980s ===
1988 Victorian state election: Footscray
Party	Candidate	Votes	%	±%
Labor	Robert Fordham	17,635	68.52	−4.83
Liberal	Ernest Zanatta	6,370	24.75	−1.90
Independent	Elizabeth Doughney	1,732	6.73	+6.73
Total formal votes		25,737	91.77	−3.46
Informal votes		2,307	8.23	+3.46
Turnout		28,044	89.16	−2.24
Two-party-preferred result
Labor	Robert Fordham	18,967	73.70	+0.35
Liberal	Ernest Zanatta	6,767	26.30	−0.35
Labor hold		Swing	+0.35	

1985 Victorian state election: Footscray
Party	Candidate	Votes	%	±%
Labor	Robert Fordham	20,516	73.4	−2.7
Liberal	Hugh Cameron	7,455	26.6	+3.0
Total formal votes		27,971	95.2	
Informal votes		1,401	4.8	
Turnout		29,372	91.4	
Labor hold		Swing	−3.0	

1982 Victorian state election: Footscray
Party	Candidate	Votes	%	±%
Labor	Robert Fordham	19,018	76.3	+6.8
Liberal	John Huntington	5,915	23.7	−1.4
Total formal votes		24,933	94.8	+0.5
Informal votes		1,372	5.2	−0.5
Turnout		26,305	93.4	+0.9
Labor hold		Swing	+2.0	

=== Elections in the 1970s ===
1979 Victorian state election: Footscray
Party	Candidate	Votes	%	±%
Labor	Robert Fordham	17,010	69.5	−2.1
Liberal	John Huntington	6,153	25.1	−3.3
Socialist Workers	Peter Abrahamson	1,308	5.4	+5.4
Total formal votes		24,471	94.3	−1.2
Informal votes		1,474	5.7	+1.2
Turnout		25,945	92.5	0.0
Two-party-preferred result
Labor	Robert Fordham	18,187	74.3	+2.8
Liberal	John Huntington	6,284	25.7	−2.8
Labor hold		Swing	+2.8	

1976 Victorian state election: Footscray
Party	Candidate	Votes	%	±%
Labor	Robert Fordham	18,528	71.6	+10.4
Liberal	James Kapoudaglis	7,368	28.4	+1.8
Total formal votes		25,896	95.5	
Informal votes		1,216	4.5	
Turnout		27,112	92.5	
Labor hold		Swing	+8.9	

1973 Victorian state election: Footscray
Party	Candidate	Votes	%	±%
Labor	Robert Fordham	13,736	62.1	+0.7
Liberal	Edmond Murphy	5,790	26.2	−0.2
Democratic Labor	Albert Bailey	2,578	11.7	−0.6
Total formal votes		22,104	94.5	−0.2
Informal votes		1,276	5.5	+0.2
Turnout		23,380	94.3	−0.7
Two-party-preferred result
Labor	Robert Fordham	14,123	63.9	+0.6
Liberal	Edmond Murphy	7,981	36.1	−0.6
Labor hold		Swing	+0.6	

1970 Victorian state election: Footscray
Party	Candidate	Votes	%	±%
Labor	Robert Fordham	13,517	61.4	−2.8
Liberal	Claus Brumm	5,782	26.3	+8.7
Democratic Labor	Robin Thomas	2,706	12.3	−5.9
Total formal votes		22,005	94.7	−0.5
Informal votes		1,231	5.3	+0.5
Turnout		23,236	95.0	+0.2
Two-party-preferred result
Labor	Robert Fordham	13,923	63.3	−4.6
Liberal	Claus Brumm	8,082	36.7	+4.6
Labor hold		Swing	−4.6	

=== Elections in the 1960s ===
1967 Victorian state election: Footscray
Party	Candidate	Votes	%	±%
Labor	Bill Divers	14,433	65.2	+1.7
Democratic Labor	Robin Thomas	4,091	18.2	+5.2
Liberal	Graham Bungate	3,971	17.6	−1.9
Total formal votes		22,495	95.2	
Informal votes		1,145	4.8	
Turnout		23,640	94.8	
Two-party-preferred result
Labor	Bill Divers	15,047	67.9	−0.3
Liberal	Graham Bungate	7,448	32.1	+0.3
Labor hold		Swing	−0.3	

- The two candidate preferred vote was not counted between the Labor and DLP candidates for Footscray.

1964 Victorian state election: Footscray
Party	Candidate	Votes	%	±%
Labor	Bill Divers	11,316	62.1	−3.6
Liberal and Country	Roland Hapke	3,835	21.0	+7.6
Democratic Labor	Robert O'Connor	2,053	11.3	−9.6
Communist	David Davies	1,020	5.6	+5.6
Total formal votes		18,224	96.2	+0.3
Informal votes		720	3.8	−0.3
Turnout		18,944	94.5	−1.1
Two-party-preferred result
Labor	Bill Divers	12,542	68.9	0.0
Liberal and Country	Roland Hapke	5,682	31.1	0.0
Labor hold		Swing	0.0	

1961 Victorian state election: Footscray
Party	Candidate	Votes	%	±%
Labor	Bill Divers	12,196	65.7	−10.9
Democratic Labor	Walter Byrne	3,870	20.9	+8.8
Liberal and Country	Peter Oliver	2,485	13.4	+2.1
Total formal votes		18,551	95.9	−2.1
Informal votes		790	4.1	+2.1
Turnout		19,341	95.6	−0.4
Two-party-preferred result
Labor	Bill Divers	12,776	68.9	−9.5
Liberal and Country	Peter Oliver	5,775	31.1	+9.5
Labor hold		Swing	−9.5	

- The two candidate preferred vote was not counted between the Labor and DLP candidates for Footscray.

=== Elections in the 1950s ===
1958 Footscray state by election
Party	Candidate	Votes	%	±%
Labor	Bill Divers	unopposed		
Labor hold		Swing		

1958 Victorian state election: Footscray
Party	Candidate	Votes	%	±%
Labor	Ernie Shepherd	14,843	76.6	
Democratic Labor	Robert Kerr	2,343	12.1	
Liberal and Country	Bryan Tonkin	2,200	11.3	
Total formal votes		19,386	98.0	
Informal votes		404	2.0	
Turnout		19,790	96.0	
Two-party-preferred result
Labor	Ernie Shepherd	15,194	78.4	
Liberal and Country	Bryan Tonkin	4,192	21.6	
Labor hold		Swing		

- The two candidate preferred vote was not counted between the Labor and DLP candidates.

1955 Victorian state election: Footscray
Party	Candidate	Votes	%	±%
Labor	Roy Schintler	11,316	61.2	
Liberal and Country	George Punshon	3,725	20.1	
Labor (A-C)	William Lloyd	3,463	18.7	
Total formal votes		18,504	98.1	
Informal votes		350	1.9	
Turnout		18,854	95.1	
Two-party-preferred result
Labor	Roy Schintler	11,835	64.0	
Liberal and Country	George Punshon	6,669	36.0	
Labor hold		Swing		

1952 Victorian state election: Footscray
Party	Candidate	Votes	%	±%
Labor	Jack Holland	18,969	93.3	+20.6
Communist	Francis Johnson	1,362	6.7	+1.1
Total formal votes		20,331	96.3	−2.1
Informal votes		781	3.7	+2.1
Turnout		21,112	90.3	−4.0
Labor hold		Swing	N/A	

1950 Victorian state election: Footscray
Party	Candidate	Votes	%	±%
Labor	Jack Holland	16,902	72.7	+0.8
Liberal and Country	Leonard Gordon	5,061	21.8	−6.3
Communist	John Arrowsmith	1,295	5.6	+5.6
Total formal votes		23,258	98.4	−0.4
Informal votes		378	1.6	+0.4
Turnout		23,636	94.3	+1.4
Two-party-preferred result
Labor	Jack Holland	18,067	77.7	+5.8
Liberal and Country	Leonard Gordon	5,191	22.3	−5.8
Labor hold		Swing	+5.8	

=== Elections in the 1940s ===
1947 Victorian state election: Footscray
Party	Candidate	Votes	%	±%
Labor	Jack Holland	17,370	71.9	−28.1
Liberal	William Massey	6,782	28.1	+28.1
Total formal votes		24,152	98.8	
Informal votes		286	1.2	
Turnout		24,438	92.9	
Labor hold		Swing	N/A	

1945 Victorian state election: Footscray
Party	Candidate	Votes	%	±%
Labor	Jack Holland	unopposed		
Labor hold		Swing		

1943 Victorian state election: Footscray
Party	Candidate	Votes	%	±%
Labor	Jack Mullens	11,514	39.3	−60.7
Independent	Andrew Hansen	7,128	24.3	+24.3
Communist	Cecil Sharpley	5,614	19.2	+19.2
Independent	Alfred Lowe	3,349	11.4	+11.4
Independent	Robert Thorne	1,680	5.7	+5.7
Total formal votes		29,285	95.1	
Informal votes		1,498	4.9	
Turnout		30,783	90.1	
Two-candidate-preferred result
Labor	Jack Mullens	16,675	56.9	−43.1
Independent	Andrew Hansen	12,610	43.1	+43.1
Labor hold		Swing	N/A	

1940 Victorian state election: Footscray
Party	Candidate	Votes	%	±%
Labor	Jack Mullens	unopposed		
Labor hold		Swing		

=== Elections in the 1930s ===
1937 Victorian state election: Footscray
Party	Candidate	Votes	%	±%
Labor	Jack Mullens	13,857	54.9	−29.4
United Australia	Edward Hanmer	11,371	45.1	+45.1
Total formal votes		25,228	98.7	+2.8
Informal votes		323	1.3	−2.8
Turnout		25,551	96.1	+0.2
Labor hold		Swing	N/A	

1935 Victorian state election: Footscray
Party	Candidate	Votes	%	±%
Labor	George Prendergast	19,684	84.3	+22.0
Communist	Alfred Watt	3,674	15.7	+15.7
Total formal votes		23,358	95.9	−2.1
Informal votes		1,006	4.1	+2.1
Turnout		24,364	95.9	−0.8
Labor hold		Swing	N/A	

1932 Victorian state election: Footscray
Party	Candidate	Votes	%	±%
Labor	George Prendergast	14,325	62.3	−37.7
United Australia	John Toll	8,666	37.7	+37.7
Total formal votes		22,991	98.0	
Informal votes		402	2.0	
Turnout		23,393	96.7	
Labor hold		Swing	N/A	

=== Elections in the 1920s ===
1929 Victorian state election: Footscray
Party	Candidate	Votes	%	±%
Labor	George Prendergast	unopposed		
Labor hold		Swing		

1927 Victorian state election: Footscray
Party	Candidate	Votes	%	±%
Labor	George Prendergast	unopposed		
Labor hold		Swing		
