= Results of the 1964 Victorian state election (Legislative Assembly) =

Australian state election results

Victorian state election, 27 June 1964 Legislative Assembly << 1961–1967 >>
Enrolled voters	1,635,311				
Votes cast	1,543,778		Turnout	94.40	–0.01
Informal votes	35,631		Informal	2.31	–0.14
Summary of votes by party
Party	Primary votes	%	Swing	Seats	Change
Liberal and Country	597,748	39.63	+3.20	38	– 1
Labor	546,279	36.22	–2.33	18	+ 1
Democratic Labor	225,779	14.97	–1.98	0	± 0
Country	132,067	8.76	+1.62	10	+ 1
Other	3,741	0.25	–0.01	0	± 0
Independent	2,533	0.17	–0.49	0	– 1
Total	1,508,147			66	
Two-party-preferred
Liberal and Country	890,164	59.0	+1.1		
Labor	617,873	41.0	–1.1		

This is a list of electoral district results for the Victorian 1964 election.

== Results by electoral district ==
=== Albert Park ===
1964 Victorian state election: Albert Park
Party	Candidate	Votes	%	±%
Labor	Keith Sutton	8,184	56.8	+0.7
Liberal and Country	Geoffrey Ryan	3,256	22.6	+0.8
Democratic Labor	Albert Jones	2,963	20.6	−1.5
Total formal votes		14,403	96.6	
Informal votes		506	3.4	
Turnout		14,909	91.9	
Two-party-preferred result
Labor	Keith Sutton	8,678	59.9	+0.5
Liberal and Country	Geoffrey Ryan	5,725	40.1	−0.5
Labor hold		Swing	+0.5	

=== Ballarat North ===
1964 Victorian state election: Ballarat North
Party	Candidate	Votes	%	±%
Liberal and Country	Tom Evans	11,061	50.6	+14.7
Labor	John Hayes	6,940	31.8	−5.1
Democratic Labor	Walter Brown	3,857	17.6	−1.3
Total formal votes		21,858	98.7	+0.1
Informal votes		297	1.3	−0.1
Turnout		22,155	96.7	+1.0
Two-party-preferred result
Liberal and Country	Tom Evans	14,339	65.6	+5.8
Labor	John Hayes	7,519	34.4	−5.8
Liberal and Country hold		Swing	+5.8	

=== Ballarat South ===
1964 Victorian state election: Ballarat South
Party	Candidate	Votes	%	±%
Liberal and Country	Bill Stephen	8,635	42.3	+1.9
Labor	Jack Jones	8,158	39.9	−1.5
Democratic Labor	Francis Brown	3,630	17.8	−0.4
Total formal votes		20,423	97.8	−0.7
Informal votes		459	2.2	+0.7
Turnout		20,882	95.4	−0.2
Two-party-preferred result
Liberal and Country	Bill Stephen	11,172	54.7	−2.0
Labor	Jack Jones	9,251	45.3	+2.0
Liberal and Country hold		Swing	−2.0	

=== Balwyn ===
1964 Victorian state election: Balwyn
Party	Candidate	Votes	%	±%
Liberal and Country	Alex Taylor	16,397	62.3	−0.1
Labor	Tony Lamb	6,746	25.6	+1.3
Democratic Labor	James Tighe	3,168	12.0	−1.3
Total formal votes		26,311	98.6	+0.1
Informal votes		375	1.4	−0.1
Turnout		26,686	93.8	−0.3
Two-party-preferred result
Liberal and Country	Alex Taylor	19,090	72.6	−1.1
Labor	Tony Lamb	7,221	27.4	+1.1
Liberal and Country hold		Swing	−1.1	

=== Benalla ===
1964 Victorian state election: Benalla
Party	Candidate	Votes	%	±%
Country	Tom Trewin	11,713	59.4	+23.6
Liberal and Country	Ewen Cameron	4,872	24.7	+5.3
Democratic Labor	Christopher Cody	3,151	16.0	+0.6
Total formal votes		19,736	98.3	+0.3
Informal votes		338	1.7	−0.3
Turnout		20,074	95.2	−3.6
Two-candidate-preferred result
Country	Tom Trewin	12,343	62.5	−4.5
Liberal and Country	Ewen Cameron	7,393	37.5	+37.5
Country hold		Swing	−4.5	

=== Benambra ===
1964 Victorian state election: Benambra
Party	Candidate	Votes	%	±%
Country	Tom Mitchell	11,140	50.4	−0.3
Labor	Edwin Ure	4,646	21.0	−2.0
Democratic Labor	John Drummond	3,228	14.6	−1.5
Liberal and Country	Ronald Petty	3,101	14.0	+3.8
Total formal votes		22,115	97.9	−0.1
Informal votes		478	2.1	+0.1
Turnout		22,593	94.6	−0.1
Two-party-preferred result
Country	Tom Mitchell	16,677	75.4	+1.8
Labor	Edwin Ure	5,438	24.6	−1.8
Country hold		Swing	+1.8	

=== Bendigo ===
1964 Victorian state election: Bendigo
Party	Candidate	Votes	%	±%
Labor	Donald McIntyre	9,204	44.1	−8.0
Liberal and Country	Robert Trethewey	7,994	38.3	+6.8
Democratic Labor	Paul Brennan	3,675	17.6	+1.2
Total formal votes		20,873	98.6	−0.2
Informal votes		302	1.4	+0.2
Turnout		21,175	95.6	−1.0
Two-party-preferred result
Liberal and Country	Robert Trethewey	10,813	51.8	+6.3
Labor	Donald McIntyre	10,060	48.2	−6.3
Liberal and Country gain from Labor		Swing	+6.3	

=== Box Hill ===
1964 Victorian state election: Box Hill
Party	Candidate	Votes	%	±%
Liberal and Country	George Reid	19,356	55.0	−0.2
Labor	Race Mathews	10,555	30.0	+2.0
Democratic Labor	Edmund Burgi	5,300	15.0	−1.8
Total formal votes		35,211	98.4	+0.2
Informal votes		565	1.6	−0.2
Turnout		35,776	94.8	+0.9
Two-party-preferred result
Liberal and Country	George Reid	23,861	67.8	−1.7
Labor	Race Mathews	11,350	32.2	+1.7
Liberal and Country hold		Swing	−1.7	

=== Brighton ===
1964 Victorian state election: Brighton
Party	Candidate	Votes	%	±%
Liberal and Country	John Rossiter	11,727	61.0	+2.7
Labor	Andrew Reid	5,000	26.0	−1.7
Democratic Labor	Edwin McSweeney	2,481	12.9	−1.0
Total formal votes		19,208	98.4	+0.1
Informal votes		310	1.6	−0.1
Turnout		19,518	92.4	−1.3
Two-party-preferred result
Liberal and Country	John Rossiter	13,836	72.0	+1.8
Labor	Andrew Reid	5,372	28.0	−1.8
Liberal and Country hold		Swing	+1.8	

=== Broadmeadows ===
1964 Victorian state election: Broadmeadows
Party	Candidate	Votes	%	±%
Labor	John Wilton	24,101	49.0	+4.6
Liberal and Country	Francis Robinson	15,537	31.6	−2.7
Democratic Labor	James Marmion	9,520	19.4	+0.5
Total formal votes		49,158	97.5	0.0
Informal votes		1,026	2.5	0.0
Turnout		50,435	95.4	+0.3
Two-party-preferred result
Labor	John Wilton	24,856	50.6	+3.6
Liberal and Country	Francis Robinson	24,302	49.4	−3.6
Labor gain from Liberal and Country		Swing	+3.6	

=== Brunswick East ===
1964 Victorian state election: Brunswick East
Party	Candidate	Votes	%	±%
Labor	Leo Fennessy	7,574	55.4	−8.1
Liberal and Country	Neil McDonell	2,975	21.8	+7.9
Democratic Labor	James Abikhair	2,767	20.2	−2.4
Communist	Rex Mortimer	352	2.6	+2.6
Total formal votes		13,668	93.3	−0.9
Informal votes		977	6.7	+0.9
Turnout		14,645	92.9	+0.6
Two-party-preferred result
Labor	Leo Fennessy	8,306	60.7	−6.2
Liberal and Country	Neil McDonell	5,362	39.3	+6.2
Labor hold		Swing	−6.2	

=== Brunswick West ===
1964 Victorian state election: Brunswick West
Party	Candidate	Votes	%	±%
Labor	Campbell Turnbull	8,762	52.2	−0.1
Liberal and Country	James Pond	4,362	26.0	+2.6
Democratic Labor	John Flint	3,654	21.8	−2.5
Total formal votes		16,778	95.7	−0.1
Informal votes		755	4.3	+0.1
Turnout		17,533	94.9	+1.1
Two-party-preferred result
Labor	Campbell Turnbull	9,310	55.5	−0.5
Liberal and Country	James Pond	7,468	44.5	+0.5
Labor hold		Swing	−0.5	

=== Burwood ===
1964 Victorian state election: Burwood
Party	Candidate	Votes	%	±%
Liberal and Country	Jim MacDonald	12,272	61.2	+1.9
Labor	Mary Barnard	5,058	25.2	−0.9
Democratic Labor	Kenneth Abbott	2,715	13.5	−1.1
Total formal votes		20,045	98.4	0.0
Informal votes		318	1.6	0.0
Turnout		20,363	94.3	−0.4
Two-party-preferred result
Liberal and Country	Jim MacDonald	14,579	72.8	+1.1
Labor	Mary Barnard	5,466	27.2	−1.1
Liberal and Country hold		Swing	+1.1	

=== Camberwell ===
1964 Victorian state election: Camberwell
Party	Candidate	Votes	%	±%
Liberal and Country	Vernon Wilcox	10,856	58.1	+0.8
Labor	Dolph Eddy	5,304	28.4	+0.6
Democratic Labor	John Rogers	2,525	13.5	−1.4
Total formal votes		18,685	98.0	+0.1
Informal votes		373	2.0	−0.1
Turnout		19,058	92.5	−0.5
Two-party-preferred result
Liberal and Country	Vernon Wilcox	13,003	69.6	−0.4
Labor	Dolph Eddy	5,682	30.4	+0.4
Liberal and Country hold		Swing	−0.4	

=== Caulfield ===
1964 Victorian state election: Caulfield
Party	Candidate	Votes	%	±%
Liberal and Country	Alexander Fraser	11,093	57.1	+1.8
Labor	Robert Vernon	5,760	29.6	+3.0
Democratic Labor	Celia Laird	2,584	13.3	−4.7
Total formal votes		19,437	98.3	+0.4
Informal votes		336	1.7	−0.4
Turnout		19,773	92.8	+0.9
Two-party-preferred result
Liberal and Country	Alexander Fraser	13,290	68.4	−2.3
Labor	Robert Vernon	6,147	31.6	+2.3
Liberal and Country hold		Swing	−2.3	

=== Coburg ===
1964 Victorian state election: Coburg
Party	Candidate	Votes	%	±%
Labor	Charlie Mutton	10,989	56.9	−1.9
Liberal and Country	John Knight	4,629	24.0	+3.7
Democratic Labor	John Hardy	3,703	19.2	−1.7
Total formal votes		19,321	97.1	+0.1
Informal votes		569	2.9	−0.1
Turnout		19,890	94.9	−0.3
Two-party-preferred result
Labor	Charlie Mutton	11,544	59.7	−2.2
Liberal and Country	John Knight	7,777	40.3	+2.2
Labor hold		Swing	−2.2	

=== Dandenong ===
1964 Victorian state election: Dandenong
Party	Candidate	Votes	%	±%
Liberal and Country	Len Reid	17,953	43.2	+2.1
Labor	Alan Lind	16,558	39.9	−3.1
Democratic Labor	Kevin Leydon	6,518	15.7	−0.2
Communist	Francis McGarry	498	1.2	+1.2
Total formal votes		41,527	97.4	−0.5
Informal votes		1,099	2.6	+0.5
Turnout		42,626	94.6	0.0
Two-party-preferred result
Liberal and Country	Len Reid	23,090	55.6	+0.3
Labor	Alan Lind	18,437	44.4	−0.3
Liberal and Country hold		Swing	+0.3	

=== Dundas ===
1964 Victorian state election: Dundas
Party	Candidate	Votes	%	±%
Liberal and Country	William McDonald	7,324	35.7	−9.3
Labor	Bob McClure	7,080	34.5	−6.3
Country	Reginald Fogarty	3,941	19.2	+19.2
Democratic Labor	James Eveston	2,186	10.6	−3.6
Total formal votes		20,531	98.6	−0.3
Informal votes		281	1.4	+0.3
Turnout		20,812	96.2	−0.2
Two-party-preferred result
Liberal and Country	William McDonald	12,096	58.9	+3.6
Labor	Bob McClure	8,345	41.1	−3.6
Liberal and Country hold		Swing	+3.6	

=== Elsternwick ===
1964 Victorian state election: Elsternwick
Party	Candidate	Votes	%	±%
Liberal and Country	Richard Gainey	11,233	58.5	+2.9
Labor	Robert Garlick	5,196	27.1	−0.6
Democratic Labor	Edward Preece	2,756	14.4	−2.2
Total formal votes		19,185	98.0	+0.1
Informal votes		384	2.0	−0.1
Turnout		19,569	93.7	−0.9
Two-party-preferred result
Liberal and Country	Richard Gainey	13,575	70.8	+1.0
Labor	Robert Garlick	5,610	29.2	−1.0
Liberal and Country hold		Swing	+1.0	

=== Essendon ===
1964 Victorian state election: Essendon
Party	Candidate	Votes	%	±%
Liberal and Country	Kenneth Wheeler	9,893	41.9	+2.0
Labor	Richard Kirby	9,234	39.1	+0.4
Democratic Labor	Kevin Digby	4,504	19.1	−1.0
Total formal votes		23,631	98.0	+0.6
Informal votes		485	2.0	−0.6
Turnout		24,116	94.9	−0.5
Two-party-preferred result
Liberal and Country	Kenneth Wheeler	13,459	57.0	0.0
Labor	Richard Kirby	10,172	43.0	0.0
Liberal and Country hold		Swing	0.0	

=== Evelyn ===
1964 Victorian state election: Evelyn
Party	Candidate	Votes	%	±%
Liberal and Country	Russell Stokes	14,923	45.5	+2.2
Labor	Donald King	12,987	39.6	−0.6
Democratic Labor	Kevin Gould	4,851	14.8	−1.7
Total formal votes		32,761	98.4	+0.2
Informal votes		536	1.6	−0.2
Turnout		33,297	94.5	+0.6
Two-party-preferred result
Liberal and Country	Russell Stokes	18,574	56.7	+1.7
Labor	Donald King	14,187	43.3	−1.7
Liberal and Country hold		Swing	+1.7	

=== Fitzroy ===
1964 Victorian state election: Fitzroy
Party	Candidate	Votes	%	±%
Labor	Denis Lovegrove	8,976	64.5	+7.0
Liberal and Country	Harley Price	2,549	17.7	+2.1
Democratic Labor	Nino Randazzo	2,402	17.2	−9.7
Total formal votes		13,927	93.8	0.0
Informal votes		927	6.2	0.0
Turnout		14,854	92.3	+1.4
Two-party-preferred result
Labor	Denis Lovegrove	9,336	67.0	+5.5
Liberal and Country	Harley Price	4,591	33.0	−5.5
Labor hold		Swing	+5.5	

=== Flemington ===
1964 Victorian state election: Flemington
Party	Candidate	Votes	%	±%
Labor	Kevin Holland	9,534	57.1	−5.5
Liberal and Country	Neal Greig	4,141	24.8	+5.4
Democratic Labor	Michael McMahon	3,026	18.1	+0.1
Total formal votes		16,701	96.4	−0.2
Informal votes		631	3.6	+0.2
Turnout		17,332	94.2	+0.7
Two-party-preferred result
Labor	Kevin Holland	9,989	59.8	−5.5
Liberal and Country	Neal Greig	6,712	40.2	+5.5
Labor hold		Swing	−5.5	

=== Footscray ===
1964 Victorian state election: Footscray
Party	Candidate	Votes	%	±%
Labor	Bill Divers	11,316	62.1	−3.6
Liberal and Country	Roland Hapke	3,835	21.0	+7.6
Democratic Labor	Robert O'Connor	2,053	11.3	−9.6
Communist	David Davies	1,020	5.6	+5.6
Total formal votes		18,224	96.2	+0.3
Informal votes		720	3.8	−0.3
Turnout		18,944	94.5	−1.1
Two-party-preferred result
Labor	Bill Divers	12,542	68.9	0.0
Liberal and Country	Roland Hapke	5,682	31.1	0.0
Labor hold		Swing	0.0	

=== Geelong ===
1964 Victorian state election: Geelong
Party	Candidate	Votes	%	±%
Liberal and Country	Hayden Birrell	10,266	48.5	+2.3
Labor	Robert Robertson	8,180	38.7	+0.7
Democratic Labor	Desmond Guinane	2,698	12.8	−3.0
Total formal votes		21,144	98.3	+0.3
Informal votes		356	1.7	−0.3
Turnout		21,500	95.5	+1.7
Two-party-preferred result
Liberal and Country	Hayden Birrell	12,678	60.0	+0.8
Labor	Robert Robertson	8,466	40.0	−0.8
Liberal and Country hold		Swing	+0.8	

=== Geelong West ===
1964 Victorian state election: Geelong West
Party	Candidate	Votes	%	±%
Labor	Neil Trezise	12,794	48.5	+0.5
Liberal and Country	Max Gillett	10,029	38.0	−0.6
Democratic Labor	James Mahoney	3,585	13.6	+0.2
Total formal votes		26,408	98.1	+0.1
Informal votes		508	1.9	−0.1
Turnout		26,916	95.5	+1.0
Two-party-preferred result
Labor	Neil Trezise	13,236	50.1	+0.3
Liberal and Country	Max Gillett	13,172	49.9	−0.3
Labor gain from Liberal and Country		Swing	+0.3	

=== Gippsland East ===
1964 Victorian state election: Gippsland East
Party	Candidate	Votes	%	±%
Country	Bruce Evans	12,729	63.9	+26.6
Liberal and Country	Rae Archibald	4,289	21.5	−2.6
Democratic Labor	Frank Burns	2,885	14.5	−0.2
Total formal votes		19,903	97.8	0.0
Informal votes		453	2.2	0.0
Turnout		20,356	93.1	−0.5
Two-candidate-preferred result
Country	Bruce Evans	13,306	66.9	+4.6
Liberal and Country	Rae Archibald	6,597	33.1	−4.6
Country hold		Swing	+4.6	

=== Gippsland South ===
1964 Victorian state election: Gippsland South
Party	Candidate	Votes	%	±%
Country	Herbert Hyland	16,090	70.4	+15.1
Democratic Labor	Geoffrey Farrell	3,492	15.3	+1.7
Liberal and Country	Peter Martin	3,275	14.3	+4.3
Total formal votes		22,857	97.7	+0.5
Informal votes		546	2.3	−0.5
Turnout		23,403	94.5	+0.1
Two-candidate-preferred result
Country	Herbert Hyland	17,728	77.6	+0.9
Democratic Labor	Geoffrey Farrell	5,129	22.4	+22.4
Country hold		Swing	−2.7	

=== Gippsland West ===
1964 Victorian state election: Gippsland West
Party	Candidate	Votes	%	±%
Country	Leslie Cochrane	8,939	41.8	+2.2
Liberal and Country	Harry Marson	5,054	23.6	+2.1
Labor	Donald McLeod	4,814	22.5	−2.7
Democratic Labor	Kevin Scanlon	2,592	12.1	−1.6
Total formal votes		21,339	98.0	+0.4
Informal votes		442	2.0	−0.4
Turnout		21,841	95.5	+0.4
Two-party-preferred result
Country	Leslie Cochrane	15,691	73.3	−0.3
Labor	Donald McLeod	5,708	26.7	+0.3
Two-candidate-preferred result
Country	Leslie Cochrane	13,813	64.6	−9.0
Liberal and Country	Harry Marson	7,586	35.4	+35.4
Country hold		Swing	−9.0	

=== Grant ===
1964 Victorian state election: Grant
Party	Candidate	Votes	%	±%
Labor	Roy Crick	23,493	56.0	+0.6
Liberal and Country	Francis Hunter	9,940	23.7	+3.8
Democratic Labor	Robert Bainbridge	8,489	20.3	−1.7
Total formal votes		41,922	96.2	−1.2
Informal votes		1,664	3.8	+1.2
Turnout		43,586	94.4	−4.7
Two-party-preferred result
Labor	Roy Crick	24,766	59.1	−2.0
Liberal and Country	Francis Hunter	17,156	40.9	+2.0
Labor hold		Swing	−2.0	

=== Hampden ===
1964 Victorian state election: Hampden
Party	Candidate	Votes	%	±%
Liberal and Country	Henry Bolte	11,538	57.2	+4.9
Labor	Arthur Solly	5,539	27.5	−2.8
Democratic Labor	Francis O'Brien	3,100	15.4	−2.0
Total formal votes		20,177	99.0	+0.1
Informal votes		206	1.0	−0.1
Turnout		20,383	96.4	0.0
Two-party-preferred result
Liberal and Country	Henry Bolte	14,173	70.2	+3.1
Labor	Arthur Solly	6,004	29.8	−3.1
Liberal and Country hold		Swing	+3.1	

=== Hawthorn ===
1964 Victorian state election: Hawthorn
Party	Candidate	Votes	%	±%
Labor	Horrie Garrick	6,454	39.3	−0.6
Liberal and Country	Walter Jona	5,973	36.4	−6.0
Democratic Labor	Charles Murphy	2,112	12.9	−4.8
Independent Liberal	Peter Garrisson	1,505	9.2	+9.2
Centre	Geoffrey Broomhall	374	2.3	+2.3
Total formal votes		16,418	95.3	−1.8
Informal votes		812	4.7	+1.8
Turnout		17,230	92.8	+1.0
Two-party-preferred result
Liberal and Country	Walter Jona	9,242	56.4	−0.9
Labor	Horrie Garrick	7,156	43.6	+0.9
Liberal and Country hold		Swing	−0.9	

=== Ivanhoe ===
1964 Victorian state election: Ivanhoe
Party	Candidate	Votes	%	±%
Liberal and Country	Vernon Christie	10,492	47.9	−0.1
Labor	William Kelly	8,235	37.6	+0.7
Democratic Labor	Cyril Cummins	3,192	14.6	−0.5
Total formal votes		21,919	98.3	+0.2
Informal votes		383	1.7	−0.2
Turnout		22,302	94.1	−0.2
Two-party-preferred result
Liberal and Country	Vernon Christie	13,467	61.4	−0.2
Labor	William Kelly	8,452	38.6	+0.2
Liberal and Country hold		Swing	−0.2	

=== Kara Kara ===
1964 Victorian state election: Kara Kara
Party	Candidate	Votes	%	±%
Liberal and Country	Keith Turnbull	7,161	38.7	+5.2
Country	Bill Phelan	5,065	27.4	+1.1
Labor	George Jeffs	4,534	24.5	−4.1
Democratic Labor	Bruno D'Elia	1,736	9.4	−2.1
Total formal votes		18,496	98.9	+0.1
Informal votes		210	1.1	−0.1
Turnout		18,706	96.4	0.0
Two-candidate-preferred result
Country	Bill Phelan	9,482	51.3	+51.3
Liberal and Country	Keith Turnbull	9,014	48.7	−15.1
Country gain from Liberal and Country		Swing	N/A	

=== Kew ===
1964 Victorian state election: Kew
Party	Candidate	Votes	%	±%
Liberal and Country	Arthur Rylah	11,319	59.3	−0.2
Labor	William Cooper	4,785	25.1	+2.3
Democratic Labor	Francis Duffy	2,991	15.7	−0.2
Total formal votes		19,095	98.1	+0.5
Informal votes		378	1.9	−0.5
Turnout		19,473	91.0	−0.9
Two-party-preferred result
Liberal and Country	Arthur Rylah	13,861	72.6	−0.6
Labor	William Cooper	5,234	27.4	+0.6
Liberal and Country hold		Swing	−0.6	

=== Lowan ===
1964 Victorian state election: Lowan
Party	Candidate	Votes	%	±%
Country	Lloyd Atkin	9,167	45.7	+45.7
Liberal and Country	Jim McCabe	9,146	45.6	−13.7
Democratic Labor	Frits Albers	1,760	8.8	−1.8
Total formal votes		20,073	98.7	−0.1
Informal votes		261	1.3	+0.1
Turnout		20,334	96.2	+0.2
Two-candidate-preferred result
Liberal and Country	Jim McCabe	10,398	51.8	−16.5
Country	Lloyd Atkin	9,675	48.2	+48.2
Liberal and Country hold		Swing	−16.5	

=== Malvern ===
1964 Victorian state election: Malvern
Party	Candidate	Votes	%	±%
Liberal and Country	John Bloomfield	11,148	65.7	+2.4
Labor	Adrianus Knulst	3,859	22.7	+0.7
Democratic Labor	James Harkin	1,971	11.6	−3.2
Total formal votes		16,978	98.1	+0.3
Informal votes		321	1.9	−0.3
Turnout		17,299	91.2	+0.1
Two-party-preferred result
Liberal and Country	John Bloomfield	12,824	75.5	−0.3
Labor	Adrianus Knulst	4,154	24.5	+0.3
Liberal and Country hold		Swing	−0.3	

=== Melbourne ===
1964 Victorian state election: Melbourne
Party	Candidate	Votes	%	±%
Labor	Arthur Clarey	6,044	49.3	+1.3
Liberal and Country	Bill Burns	3,860	31.5	+3.2
Democratic Labor	Thomas Brennan	2,348	19.2	−2.8
Total formal votes		12,252	95.5	+1.9
Informal votes		575	4.5	−1.9
Turnout		12,827	90.2	+0.2
Two-party-preferred result
Labor	Arthur Clarey	6,248	51.0	−2.8
Liberal and Country	Bill Burns	6,004	49.0	+2.8
Labor hold		Swing	−2.8	

=== Mentone ===
1964 Victorian state election: Mentone
Party	Candidate	Votes	%	±%
Labor	Harold Blair	11,643	44.8	+3.4
Liberal and Country	Edward Meagher	10,689	41.2	−0.1
Democratic Labor	George White	3,635	14.0	−3.3
Total formal votes		25,967	98.4	+0.3
Informal votes		430	1.6	−0.3
Turnout		26,397	94.1	−0.3
Two-party-preferred result
Liberal and Country	Edward Meagher	14,006	53.9	−3.4
Labor	Harold Blair	11,961	46.1	+3.4
Liberal and Country hold		Swing	−3.4	

=== Midlands ===
1964 Victorian state election: Midlands
Party	Candidate	Votes	%	±%
Labor	Clive Stoneham	10,845	48.5	−3.3
Liberal and Country	Roger McArthur	8,120	36.3	+3.2
Democratic Labor	John Timberlake	3,387	15.2	0.0
Total formal votes		22,352	98.6	+0.3
Informal votes		318	1.4	−0.3
Turnout		22,670	94.9	−1.4
Two-party-preferred result
Labor	Clive Stoneham	11,420	51.1	−3.0
Liberal and Country	Roger McArthur	10,932	48.9	+3.0
Labor hold		Swing	−3.0	

=== Mildura ===
1964 Victorian state election: Mildura
Party	Candidate	Votes	%	±%
Country	Milton Whiting	9,827	50.4	−8.1
Labor	Lance Fraser	5,888	30.2	+6.9
Liberal and Country	Bruce Wright	1,911	9.8	+1.0
Democratic Labor	Donald Delaney	1,874	9.6	+0.2
Total formal votes		19,500	97.6	+0.2
Informal votes		485	2.4	−0.2
Turnout		19,985	95.3	−0.1
Two-party-preferred result
Country	Milton Whiting	13,141	67.4	−7.1
Labor	Lance Fraser	6,359	32.6	+7.1
Country hold		Swing	−7.1	

=== Moonee Ponds ===
1964 Victorian state election: Moonee Ponds
Party	Candidate	Votes	%	±%
Labor	Tom Edmunds	7,903	43.3	+1.8
Liberal and Country	Jack Holden	7,293	39.9	+1.1
Democratic Labor	Barry O'Brien	3,078	16.8	−1.3
Total formal votes		18,274	97.4	+0.2
Informal votes		481	2.6	−0.2
Turnout		18,755	93.9	−0.7
Two-party-preferred result
Liberal and Country	Jack Holden	10,224	56.0	+0.1
Labor	Tom Edmunds	8,050	44.0	−0.1
Liberal and Country hold		Swing	+0.1	

=== Moorabbin ===
1964 Victorian state election: Moorabbin
Party	Candidate	Votes	%	±%
Liberal and Country	Bob Suggett	15,477	48.7	+23.3
Labor	Ken Farrall	11,889	37.4	−1.0
Democratic Labor	Thomas McDonald	4,445	14.0	−0.5
Total formal votes		31,811	98.5	+0.1
Informal votes		479	1.5	−0.1
Turnout		32,290	95.0	−0.8
Two-party-preferred result
Liberal and Country	Bob Suggett	19,413	61.0	+61.0
Labor	Ken Farrall	12,398	39.0	−2.3
Liberal and Country gain from Independent Liberal		Swing	N/A	

=== Mornington ===
1964 Victorian state election: Mornington
Party	Candidate	Votes	%	±%
Liberal and Country	Roberts Dunstan	17,629	57.8	+0.3
Labor	Ken Stafford	8,678	28.5	+1.9
Democratic Labor	John Cass	4,196	13.8	−2.1
Total formal votes		30,503	98.0	−0.3
Informal votes		626	2.0	+0.3
Turnout		31,129	92.8	−0.4
Two-party-preferred result
Liberal and Country	Roberts Dunstan	21,195	69.5	−1.6
Labor	Ken Stafford	9,308	30.5	+1.6
Liberal and Country hold		Swing	−1.6	

=== Morwell ===
1964 Victorian state election: Morwell
Party	Candidate	Votes	%	±%
Labor	George Wragg	9,826	42.3	−1.2
Liberal and Country	Jim Balfour	8,722	37.6	+5.8
Democratic Labor	Bernard Shaw	2,844	12.2	−0.7
Country	Ian Gibson	1,826	7.9	−4.0
Total formal votes		23,218	98.1	+0.4
Informal votes		444	1.9	−0.4
Turnout		23,662	95.8	+0.7
Two-party-preferred result
Liberal and Country	Jim Balfour	12,915	55.6	+4.0
Labor	George Wragg	10,303	44.4	−4.0
Liberal and Country hold		Swing	+4.0	

=== Mulgrave ===
1964 Victorian state election: Mulgrave
Party	Candidate	Votes	%	±%
Liberal and Country	Ray Wiltshire	27,408	50.5	+2.7
Labor	Aubrey Walker	18,598	34.3	−2.1
Democratic Labor	Ivan Frawley	8,233	15.2	+0.7
Total formal votes		54,239	98.6	+0.3
Informal votes		790	1.4	−0.3
Turnout		55,029	94.8	−0.1
Two-party-preferred result
Liberal and Country	Ray Wiltshire	34,406	63.4	+1.8
Labor	Aubrey Walker	19,833	36.6	−1.8
Liberal and Country hold		Swing	+1.8	

=== Murray Valley ===
1964 Victorian state election: Murray Valley
Party	Candidate	Votes	%	±%
Country	George Moss	13,612	60.0	+11.4
Liberal and Country	Thomas Gribben	5,112	22.5	+12.7
Democratic Labor	John Patterson	3,978	17.5	+2.6
Total formal votes		22,702	97.2	−0.2
Informal votes		645	2.8	+0.2
Turnout		23,347	95.2	−0.6
Two-candidate-preferred result
Country	George Moss	14,408	63.5	−6.6
Liberal and Country	Thomas Gribben	8,294	36.5	+36.5
Country hold		Swing	−6.6	

=== Northcote ===
1964 Victorian state election: Northcote
Party	Candidate	Votes	%	±%
Labor	Frank Wilkes	9,973	56.0	−1.0
Liberal and Country	Max Crellin	4,772	26.8	+8.7
Democratic Labor	Jack Little	3,061	17.2	−7.7
Total formal votes		17,806	96.6	−0.2
Informal votes		617	3.4	+0.2
Turnout		18,423	94.7	−0.2
Two-party-preferred result
Labor	Frank Wilkes	10,432	58.6	−2.1
Liberal and Country	Max Crellin	7,374	41.4	+2.1
Labor hold		Swing	−2.1	

=== Oakleigh ===
1964 Victorian state election: Oakleigh
Party	Candidate	Votes	%	±%
Liberal and Country	Alan Scanlan	9,935	45.5	+5.6
Labor	Val Doube	8,946	41.0	−4.5
Democratic Labor	Morris Kinnane	2,733	12.5	−2.1
Independent	Jean McKeown	224	1.0	+1.0
Total formal votes		21,838	98.1	−0.3
Informal votes		427	1.9	+0.3
Turnout		22,265	95.4	+0.3
Two-party-preferred result
Liberal and Country	Alan Scanlan	12,559	57.5	+5.0
Labor	Val Doube	9,279	42.5	−5.0
Liberal and Country hold		Swing	+5.0	

=== Ormond ===
1964 Victorian state election: Ormond
Party	Candidate	Votes	%	±%
Liberal and Country	Joe Rafferty	12,035	50.9	+2.5
Labor	Kenneth Stone	8,500	35.9	+1.1
Democratic Labor	Robert Semmel	3,128	13.2	−3.6
Total formal votes		23,663	98.0	0.0
Informal votes		488	2.0	0.0
Turnout		24,151	94.6	−0.7
Two-party-preferred result
Liberal and Country	Joe Rafferty	14,694	62.1	−1.1
Labor	Kenneth Stone	8,969	37.9	+1.1
Liberal and Country hold		Swing	−1.1	

=== Polwarth ===
1964 Victorian state election: Polwarth
Party	Candidate	Votes	%	±%
Liberal and Country	Tom Darcy	15,128	59.9	+17.2
Labor	Edwin Morris	6,522	25.8	−0.2
Democratic Labor	Thomas Fleming	3,594	14.2	−1.3
Total formal votes		25,244	98.7	+0.3
Informal votes		322	1.3	−0.3
Turnout		25,566	96.1	+0.4
Two-party-preferred result
Liberal and Country	Tom Darcy	18,184	72.0	+0.4
Labor	Edwin Morris	7,060	28.0	−0.4
Liberal and Country hold		Swing	+0.4	

=== Portland ===
1964 Victorian state election: Portland
Party	Candidate	Votes	%	±%
Liberal and Country	George Gibbs	7,948	36.1	+3.0
Labor	George Gowty	6,784	30.8	−2.3
Democratic Labor	John Russell	3,730	16.9	−1.9
Country	Leonard Mibus	3,577	16.2	+1.1
Total formal votes		22,039	98.6	−0.1
Informal votes		313	1.4	+0.1
Turnout		22,352	95.8	+0.6
Two-party-preferred result
Liberal and Country	George Gibbs	14,289	64.8	+2.5
Labor	George Gowty	7,750	35.2	−2.5
Liberal and Country hold		Swing	+2.5	

=== Prahran ===
1964 Victorian state election: Prahran
Party	Candidate	Votes	%	±%
Liberal and Country	Sam Loxton	7,464	45.8	+4.1
Labor	Robert Pettiona	6,709	41.1	−4.2
Democratic Labor	Gordon Haberman	1,794	10.5	−2.5
Independent	John Amurry	430	2.6	+2.6
Total formal votes		16,307	96.6	−0.5
Informal votes		567	3.4	+0.5
Turnout		16,874	92.3	0.0
Two-party-preferred result
Liberal and Country	Sam Loxton	14,289	64.8	+2.5
Labor	Robert Pettiona	7,750	35.2	−2.5
Liberal and Country hold		Swing	+2.5	

=== Preston ===
1964 Victorian state election: Preston
Party	Candidate	Votes	%	±%
Labor	Charlie Ring	13,417	55.6	+0.8
Liberal and Country	Henry Newland	6,000	24.9	+3.2
Democratic Labor	Michael Lucy	4,695	19.5	−4.6
Total formal votes		24,112	97.6	+0.1
Informal votes		586	2.4	−0.1
Turnout		24,698	95.2	+0.4
Two-party-preferred result
Labor	Charlie Ring	14,121	58.5	+0.1
Liberal and Country	Henry Newland	9,991	41.5	−0.1
Labor hold		Swing	+0.1	

=== Reservoir ===
1964 Victorian state election: Reservoir
Party	Candidate	Votes	%	±%
Labor	Harry Jenkins	14,337	53.9	−0.9
Liberal and Country	Peter Coupe	6,645	25.0	+5.9
Democratic Labor	Frederick Whitling	4,618	17.4	−4.6
Communist	William Barnes	987	3.7	−0.4
Total formal votes		26,587	97.0	−0.1
Informal votes		810	3.0	+0.1
Turnout		27,397	95.6	−0.5
Two-party-preferred result
Labor	Harry Jenkins	15,918	59.9	−1.9
Liberal and Country	Peter Coupe	10,669	40.1	+1.9
Labor hold		Swing	−1.9	

=== Richmond ===
1964 Victorian state election: Richmond
Party	Candidate	Votes	%	±%
Labor	Clyde Holding	9,027	63.1	+2.1
Democratic Labor	Sydney Tutton	2,786	19.5	−6.3
Liberal and Country	Leon Bram	2,505	17.5	+9.4
Total formal votes		14,318	95.3	+0.9
Informal votes		704	4.7	−0.9
Turnout		15,022	92.9	+1.4
Two-party-preferred result
Labor	Clyde Holding	9,446	66.0	−3.5
Liberal and Country	Leon Bram	4,872	34.0	+3.5
Labor hold		Swing	−3.5	

- The two candidate preferred vote was not counted between the Labor and DLP candidates for Richmond

=== Ringwood ===
1964 Victorian state election: Ringwood
Party	Candidate	Votes	%	±%
Liberal and Country	Jim Manson	19,350	50.3	+2.7
Labor	Graham Walsh	13,580	35.3	−1.7
Democratic Labor	Kevin Adamson	5,512	14.3	−1.1
Total formal votes		38,442	98.5	+0.1
Informal votes		576	1.5	−0.1
Turnout		39,018	95.2	−0.8
Two-party-preferred result
Liberal and Country	Jim Manson	24,136	62.5	+1.0
Labor	Graham Walsh	14,306	37.5	−1.0
Liberal and Country hold		Swing	+1.0	

=== Ripponlea ===
1964 Victorian state election: Ripponlea
Party	Candidate	Votes	%	±%
Liberal and Country	Edgar Tanner	8,416	48.7	+1.0
Labor	Anthony Fisher	6,690	38.7	+3.6
Democratic Labor	Joseph O'Leary	2,165	12.5	−4.7
Total formal votes		17,271	96.5	−0.2
Informal votes		619	3.5	+0.2
Turnout		17,890	90.7	−0.1
Two-party-preferred result
Liberal and Country	Edgar Tanner	10,298	59.6	−0.8
Labor	Anthony Fisher	6,973	40.4	+0.8
Liberal and Country hold		Swing	−0.8	

=== Rodney ===
1964 Victorian state election: Rodney
Party	Candidate	Votes	%	±%
Country	Russell McDonald	12,854	58.8	+13.2
Liberal and Country	John Quinn	5,334	24.4	+2.1
Democratic Labor	Spencer Broom	3,683	16.8	−0.5
Total formal votes		21,871	97.9	+0.3
Informal votes		470	2.1	−0.3
Turnout		22,341	95.7	+0.1
Two-candidate-preferred result
Country	Russell McDonald	13,591	62.1	+6.0
Liberal and Country	John Quinn	8,750	37.9	−6.0
Country hold		Swing	+6.0	

=== St Kilda ===
1964 Victorian state election: St Kilda
Party	Candidate	Votes	%	±%
Liberal and Country	Brian Dixon	7,916	48.1	+1.6
Labor	Juliet Dahlitz	6,676	40.5	+1.5
Democratic Labor	John Hughes	1,883	11.4	−3.1
Total formal votes		16,475	96.6	−0.1
Informal votes		571	3.4	+0.1
Turnout		17,046	91.8	+1.5
Two-party-preferred result
Liberal and Country	Brian Dixon	9,626	58.4	0.0
Labor	Juliet Dahlitz	6,849	41.6	0.0
Liberal and Country hold		Swing	0.0	

=== Sandringham ===
1964 Victorian state election: Sandringham
Party	Candidate	Votes	%	±%
Liberal and Country	Murray Porter	13,488	52.2	+2.5
Labor	Russell Castley	8,732	33.8	−2.5
Democratic Labor	William Leech	3,124	12.1	−1.9
Communist	John O'Mara	474	1.8	+1.8
Total formal votes		25,818	98.4	−0.1
Informal votes		422	1.6	+0.1
Turnout		26,240	94.3	−1.4
Two-party-preferred result
Liberal and Country	Murray Porter	16,191	62.7	+0.2
Labor	Russell Castley	9,627	37.3	−0.2
Liberal and Country hold		Swing	+0.2	

=== Scoresby ===
1964 Victorian state election: Scoresby
Party	Candidate	Votes	%	±%
Liberal and Country	Bill Borthwick	17,207	51.5	+2.3
Labor	Caroline Wilder	12,228	36.6	−2.0
Democratic Labor	Peter Tunstall	4,004	12.0	−0.3
Total formal votes		33,439	97.9	−0.4
Informal votes		702	2.1	+0.4
Turnout		34,141	94.3	−0.5
Two-party-preferred result
Liberal and Country	Bill Borthwick	20,611	61.6	+1.8
Labor	Caroline Wilder	12,828	38.4	−1.8
Liberal and Country hold		Swing	+1.8	

=== Swan Hill ===
1964 Victorian state election: Swan Hill
Party	Candidate	Votes	%	±%
Country	Harold Stirling	7,182	38.7	+11.3
Country	Thomas Mellor	4,405	23.8	+23.8
Labor	Jack McLean	3,396	18.3	+5.2
Democratic Labor	John McMahon	2,118	11.4	−1.7
Liberal and Country	Bernard Treseder	1,438	7.8	−11.2
Total formal votes		18,539	96.4	−0.6
Informal votes		686	3.6	+0.6
Turnout		19,225	95.6	−0.8
Two-party-preferred result
Country	Harold Stirling	14,589	78.7	−6.7
Labor	Jack McLean	3,950	21.3	+6.7
Country hold		Swing	−6.7	

=== Toorak ===
1964 Victorian state election: Toorak
Party	Candidate	Votes	%	±%
Liberal and Country	Philip Hudson	10,112	60.8	−12.9
Labor	George Gahan	5,060	30.5	+30.5
Democratic Labor	Rita McGuiness	1,447	8.7	−17.6
Total formal votes		16,619	97.6	+6.6
Informal votes		402	2.4	−6.6
Turnout		17,021	90.0	+0.2
Two-party-preferred result
Liberal and Country	Philip Hudson	11,341	68.3	−5.4
Labor	George Gahan	5,278	31.7	+31.7
Liberal and Country hold		Swing	+7.8	

=== Williamstown ===
1964 Victorian state election: Williamstown
Party	Candidate	Votes	%	±%
Labor	Larry Floyd	11,145	65.7	−4.5
Liberal and Country	Robert Lawson	3,046	18.0	+6.9
Democratic Labor	Kenneth Berrie	2,351	13.9	−1.1
Communist	William Tregear	410	2.4	+2.4
Total formal votes		16,952	96.9	0.0
Informal votes		535	3.1	0.0
Turnout		17,487	94.5	+0.7
Two-party-preferred result
Labor	Larry Floyd	11,866	70.0	−5.4
Liberal and Country	Robert Lawson	5,086	30.0	+5.4
Labor hold		Swing	−5.4	

=== Yarraville ===
1964 Victorian state election: Yarraville
Party	Candidate	Votes	%	±%
Labor	Roy Schintler	12,694	65.2	−1.9
Democratic Labor	Alfred Gerrard	3,605	18.5	−3.9
Liberal and Country	Bernard Wallace	3,184	16.3	+5.8
Total formal votes		19,483	96.5	0.0
Informal votes		703	3.5	0.0
Turnout		20,186	94.9	−0.1
Two-party-preferred result
Labor	Roy Schintler	13,234	67.9	−2.6
Liberal and Country	Bernard Wallace	6,249	32.1	+2.6
Labor hold		Swing	−2.6	

- The two candidate preferred vote was not counted between the Labor and DLP candidates for Yarraville.

== See also ==
- 1964 Victorian state election
- Members of the Victorian Legislative Assembly, 1964–1967
