= Candidates of the 1961 Victorian state election =

The 1961 Victorian state election was held on 15 July 1961.

== Retiring Members ==
=== Liberal and Country ===
- Sir Thomas Maltby MLA (Geelong)
- Charles Bridgford MLC (South Eastern)

=== Country ===
- Frederick Cook MLA (Benalla)
- Sir Albert Lind MLA (Gippsland East)

== Legislative Assembly ==
Sitting members are shown in bold text. Successful candidates are highlighted in the relevant colour. Where there is possible confusion, an asterisk (*) is also used.

Electorate	Held by	Labor candidates	LCP candidates	Country candidates	DLP candidates	Other candidates
Albert Park	Labor	**Keith Sutton**	Thomas Merrett		Albert Jones	
Ballarat North	LCP	Philip Gray	**Tom Evans**	Alexander Hoffert	Walter Brown	
Ballarat South	LCP	Ron Wilson	**Gordon Scott**		Francis Brown	
Balwyn	LCP	Edmund Du Vergier	**Alex Taylor**		Leo Erwin	
Benalla	Country	Jack Ginifer	John Hanson	Tom Trewin	Bartholomew O'Dea	
Benambra	Country	Reginald Mortimer	Robert Kilpatrick	**Tom Mitchell**	William Findlay	
Bendigo	Labor	**Bill Galvin**	Thomas Flood		Paul Brennan	
Box Hill	LCP	William O'Grady	**George Reid**		Edmund Burgi	
Brighton	LCP	Geoffrey Blunden	**John Rossiter**		Edwin McSweeney	
Broadmeadows	LCP	Joseph Smith	**Harry Kane**		John Donnellon	Anthony van der Loo (Ind)
Brunswick East	Labor	**Leo Fennessy**	Warren Mills		Allan Swain	
Brunswick West	Labor	**Campbell Turnbull**	Norman Glass		John Flint	
Burwood	LCP	Peter Lynn	**Jim MacDonald**		John Duffy	
Camberwell	LCP	Anthony Giblett	**Vernon Wilcox**		Celia Laird	
Caulfield	LCP	Sydney Edwards	**Alexander Fraser**		Walter Culliford	
Coburg	Labor	**Charlie Mutton**	Bryce Pyatt		John Livingstone	
Dandenong	LCP	Alan Lind	**Len Reid**		John Simmons	
Dundas	LCP	Bob McClure	**Sir William McDonald**		James Eveston	
Elsternwick	LCP	George Smith	**Richard Gainey**		Edward Preece	
Essendon	LCP	Leslie Edmunds	**Kenneth Wheeler**		Kevin Digby	Norman McClure (Ind)
Evelyn	LCP	Donald King	**Russell Stokes**		Kevin Gould	
Fitzroy	Labor	**Denis Lovegrove**	Maxwell Lee		Bill Barry	
Flemington	Labor	**Kevin Holland**	John Marshall		Michael McMahon	
Footscray	Labor	**Bill Divers**	Peter Oliver		Walter Byrne	
Geelong	LCP	William King	Hayden Birrell		William Mithen	
Geelong West	LCP	Neil Trezise	**Max Gillett**		James Mahoney	
Gippsland East	Country	Neil Rosser	Rae Archibald	Bruce Evans	Frank Burns	
Gippsland South	Country	Albert Thexton	Leslie Horsfield	**Sir Herbert Hyland**	Geoffrey Farrell	Bryan Fitzgerald (Ind)
Gippsland West	Country	Eric Kent	Toni Garside	**Leslie Cochrane**	Kevin Scanlon	
Grant	Labor	**Roy Crick**	Max Crellin		Robert Bainbridge	William Wilson (CPA)
Hampden	LCP	George Price	**Henry Bolte**		Francis O'Brien	
Hawthorn	LCP	John Reeves	**Peter Garrisson**		Charles Murphy	
Ivanhoe	LCP	Norman Rothfield	**Vernon Christie**		Cyril Cummins	
Kara Kara	LCP	Cyril Sudholz	**Keith Turnbull**	Bill Phelan	Vincent Gervasoni	
Kew	LCP	William Cooper	**Arthur Rylah**		Francis Duffy	Eric Thornton (CPA)
Lowan	LCP	James Redford	**Wilfred Mibus**		Derek Williams	
Malvern	LCP	James McGarvin	**John Bloomfield**		Thomas Carty	
Melbourne	Labor	**Arthur Clarey**	Bill Burns		Tom Hayes	Henry Roche (Ind)
Mentone	LCP	Nola Barber	**Edward Meagher**		George White	
Midlands	Labor	**Clive Stoneham**	Keith Lewis		John Timberlake	
Mildura	Country	Douglas Burgess	Raymond Dixon	**Nathaniel Barclay**	William McInerney	
Moonee Ponds	LCP	Tom Edmunds	**Jack Holden**		Paul Gunn	Peter Kirchner (Ind)
Moorabbin	LCP	Les Coates	Llew Reese		James Healy	**Bob Suggett** (Ind Lib)
Mornington	LCP	Brian Pigott	**Roberts Dunstan**		John Cass	
Morwell	LCP	George Brown	**Jim Balfour**	John Vinall	Leslie Hilton	
Mulgrave	LCP	Vincent Scully	**Ray Wiltshire**		Leo Sparrow	
Murray Valley	Country	Ronald Kirby	Bruno Marmo	**George Moss**	John Patterson	
Northcote	Labor	**Frank Wilkes**	Julian Sullivan		Jack Little	
Oakleigh	Labor	**Val Doube**	Alan Scanlan		Morris Kinnane	
Ormond	LCP	Kenneth Stone	**Joe Rafferty**		Robert Semmel	
Polwarth	LCP	Edwin Morris	**Tom Darcy**	Lloyd Kidman	Alan Bruce	
Portland	LCP	George Gowty	**George Gibbs**	Stewart Price	John Russell	
Prahran	LCP	George Gahan	**Sam Loxton**		Gordon Haberman	
Preston	Labor	**Charlie Ring**	Colin Pritchard		Michael Lucy	
Reservoir	Labor	**Harry Jenkins**	David Welsh		Frederick Whitling	John Arrowsmith (CPA)
Richmond	Labor	**Bill Towers**	John Ridge		Leo Gardner	Harry Bocquet (CPA)
Ringwood	LCP	David Ould	**Jim Manson**		William Johnson	
Ripponlea	LCP	Steven Goldberg	**Edgar Tanner**		Michael Cunneen	
Rodney	Country	Neil Frankland	Francis Charlton	**Richard Brose**	Spencer Broom	
St Kilda	LCP	Leslie Atherton	**Baron Snider**		John Hughes	
Sandringham	LCP	Kenneth Farrall	**Murray Porter**		John Ryan	
Scoresby	LCP	Ronald Wanklin	**Bill Borthwick**		George Noone	
Swan Hill	Country	Clarence Wohlers	Gordon Harrison	Herbert Hilton; **Harold Stirling***	John McMahon	John Hipworth (Ind Lib)
Toorak	LCP		**Horace Petty**		John Speed	
Williamstown	Labor	**Larry Floyd**	Neil McNeill		John Twomey	William Smith (CPA)
Yarraville	Labor	**Roy Schintler**	Neal Greig		Alfred Gerrard	

== Legislative Council ==
Sitting members are shown in bold text. Successful candidates are highlighted in the relevant colour. Where there is possible confusion, an asterisk (*) is also used.

Province	Held by	Labor candidates	LCP candidates	Country candidates	DLP candidates	Other candidates
Ballarat	LCP	Jack Jones	**Pat Dickie**		William Bruty	
Bendigo	LCP	Patrick McMahon	**Thomas Grigg**		William Drechsler	
Doutta Galla	Labor	**John Tripovich**	Kenneth Jones		Barry O'Brien	
East Yarra	LCP	Leo Bartley	**Sir Ewen Cameron**		John Hoare	
Gippsland	Country	George Evans	Archie Tanner	**Bob May**	John Hansen	
Higinbotham	LCP	Eric Perryman	**Lindsay Thompson**		Henry Moore	
Melbourne	Labor	**Doug Elliot**	Reginald Cannon		Harold Powell	
Melbourne North	Labor	**John Galbally**	Alfred Carter		Kevin Daniel	
Melbourne West	Labor	**Buckley Machin**	Dudley Coombes		Bert Bailey	
Monash	LCP	Frederick Levin	**Charles Gawith**		Thomas Brennan	Arthur Bennett (Ind); Frank Power (Ind)
Northern	Country	John Cameron	Laurence Troy	**Percy Feltham**	Bernard Hallinan	
North Eastern	Country	Lorne Collins	Jim Plowman	**Keith Bradbury**	Arthur White	
North Western	Country	Thomas Gilhooley	Geoffrey Harding	**Arthur Mansell**	Michael Howley	
Southern	LCP	Stanley Willis	**Gilbert Chandler**		Raymond Studham	
South Eastern	LCP	Reginald Butler	Alan Hunt		Martin Curry	
South Western	LCP	Stanley Nash	**Sir Gordon McArthur**		Newell Barrett	
Western	LCP	James McIntyre	**Ronald Mack**		Geoffrey White	
