= Candidates of the 1958 Victorian state election =

The 1958 Victorian state election was held on 31 May 1958.

== Seat changes ==
There was a redistribution of boundaries in 1958. In consequence:

- Ascot Vale Labor MLA Ernie Shepherd contested Footscray.
- Carlton Labor MLA Denis Lovegrove contested Fitzroy.
- Caulfield LCP MLA Joe Rafferty contested Ormond.
- Caulfield East LCP MLA Alexander Fraser contested Caulfield.
- Collingwood Labor MLA Bill Towers contested Richmond.
- Dandenong LCP MLA Ray Wiltshire contested Mulgrave.
- Footscray Labor MLA Roy Schintler contested Yarraville.
- Hawthorn LCP MLA Jim Manson contested Ringwood.
- Pascoe Vale Labor MLA Arthur Drakeford contested Essendon.
- Port Melbourne Labor MLA Archie Todd contested the Legislative Council.

== Retiring Members ==
=== Liberal and Country ===
- Edward Guye MLA (Polwarth)

== Legislative Assembly ==
Sitting members are shown in bold text. Successful candidates are highlighted in the relevant colour. Where there is possible confusion, an asterisk (*) is also used.

Electorate	Held by	Labor candidates	LCP candidates	Country candidates	DLP candidates	Other candidates
Albert Park	Labor	**Keith Sutton**	Roy Schilling		Stan Corrigan	Vida Little (CPA)
Ballarat North	Country	Ronald House	Tom Evans	**Russell White**	James Meere	
Ballarat South	LCP	Maxwell Pinkard	**Gordon Scott**	Arthur Philips	Leslie D'Arcy	
Balwyn	LCP	John MacPherson	**Alex Taylor**		Leo Erwin	Frank Block (Ind)
Benalla	Country	Jack Ginifer	James Bennison	**Frederick Cook**	William Mithen	
Benambra	Country	Francis Taylor	James Shannon	**Tom Mitchell**	Henry Richards	
Bendigo	LCP	Bill Galvin	**John Stanistreet**	William Nicholls	James Brosnan	
Box Hill	LCP	William Betton	**George Reid**		Edmund Burgi	
Brighton	LCP	Reginald Hayes	**John Rossiter**			
Broadmeadows	LCP	Joseph Smith	**Harry Kane**		John Donnellon	
Brunswick East	Labor	**Leo Fennessy**	Bill Burns		Allan Swain	
Brunswick West	Labor	**Campbell Turnbull**	Alfred Wall		Peter Randles	
Burwood	LCP	Vincent Scully	**Jim MacDonald**			
Camberwell	LCP	George Blood	**Vernon Wilcox**		Leonora Lloyd	
Caulfield	LCP	Alan Brenton	**Alexander Fraser**		Celia Laird	
Coburg	Independent	**Charlie Mutton**	Peter Robertson		Kevin O'Dea	
Dandenong	LCP	Alan Lind	Len Reid		Reginald Kearney	
Dundas	LCP	Bob McClure	**Sir William McDonald**		John Peters	
Elsternwick	LCP	George Smith	**Richard Gainey**		Rex Keane	
Essendon	Labor	**Arthur Drakeford**	Kenneth Wheeler		Kevin Digby	
Evelyn	Labor	**Phillip Connell**	Russell Stokes		Kevin Gould	
Fitzroy	Labor	**Denis Lovegrove**	Charles Gillies		David Woodhouse	
Flemington	Labor	**Kevin Holland**	Norman Loader		Michael McMahon	
Footscray	Labor	**Ernie Shepherd**	Bryan Tonkin		Robert Kerr	
Geelong	LCP	George Poyser	**Sir Thomas Maltby**		George Taylor	Albert Woodward (Ind)
Geelong West	Labor	**Colin MacDonald**	Max Gillett		James Mahoney	
Gippsland East	Country		Rae Archibald	**Sir Albert Lind**	Frank Burns	
Gippsland South	Country			**Sir Herbert Hyland**	John Hansen	
Gippsland West	Country	James Longstaff	James Hosking	**Leslie Cochrane**	Kevin Scanlon	
Grant	Labor	**Roy Crick**	John Anderson		Maxwell Campbell	
Hampden	LCP	Fred Levin	**Henry Bolte**		Leo O'Brien	
Hawthorn	LCP	Jack Poke	Peter Garrisson		Charles Murphy	
Ivanhoe	LCP	David Walker	**Vernon Christie**		Cyril Cummins	
Kara Kara	LCP	Cyril Sudholz	**Keith Turnbull**	Allen Reseigh	Gerard Gilders	
Kew	LCP	Kevin Lynch	**Arthur Rylah**		John Buchanan	Ralph Gibson (CPA)
Lowan	LCP		**Wilfred Mibus**	Ian McCann	Edgar McMahon	
Malvern	LCP		**John Bloomfield**			Mascotte Brown (Ind)
Melbourne	Labor	**Arthur Clarey**	Martha Yuille		Tom Hayes	
Mentone	LCP	Alfred O'Connor	**Edward Meagher**		George White	
Midlands	Labor	**Clive Stoneham**	James Mactier		John Timberlake	
Mildura	Country	William Nicholas		**Nathaniel Barclay**	John Cotter	
Moonee Ponds	LCP	Thomas Moloney	**Jack Holden**		Paul Gunn	Lancelot Hutchinson (Ind)
Moorabbin	LCP	Les Coates	**Bob Suggett**		Desmond Ward	
Mornington	LCP	Gordon Anstee	**Roberts Dunstan**			
Morwell	LCP	Hector Stoddart	**Jim Balfour**		Alfred Gerrard	
Mulgrave	LCP	John Neal	**Ray Wiltshire**		Leo Sparrow	
Murray Valley	Country	Neil Frankland		**George Moss**	John Patterson	
Northcote	Labor	**Frank Wilkes**	Edward Wells		Thomas Walsh	
Oakleigh	Labor	**Val Doube**	William Downard		John Heffernan	
Ormond	LCP	Robert Flanagan	**Joe Rafferty**		Robert Semmel	Gilbert Smith (Ind)
Polwarth	LCP	William King	Tom Darcy	Ronald McDonough	Michael Finlay	
Portland	LCP	Malcolm Gladman	**George Gibbs**		John Russell	
Prahran	LCP	Robert Pettiona	**Sam Loxton**		Gordon Haberman	
Preston	Labor	**Charlie Ring**	Neville Crocker		Michael Lucy	
Reservoir	Labor	**William Ruthven**	Hubert Joelson		Frederick Whitling	
Richmond	DLP	**Bill Towers**	Nicholas Renton		**Frank Scully**	
Ringwood	LCP	William Webber	**Jim Manson**		Bruce Burne	
Ripponlea	LCP	Jack Kagan	**Edgar Tanner**		Dermot O'Neill	
Rodney	Country			**Richard Brose**	Spencer Broom	
St Kilda	LCP	Paul Fraser	**Baron Snider**		John Hughes	
Sandringham	LCP	Henry Fowler	**Murray Porter**		Thomas Ryan	
Scoresby	LCP	Reginald Robertson	**Sir George Knox**		George Noone	
Swan Hill	Country			**Harold Stirling**		John Hipworth (Ind Lib)
Toorak	LCP	George Gahan	**Horace Petty**			
Williamstown	Labor	**Larry Floyd**	Joy Head		Edward Purchase	William Tregear (CPA)
Yarraville	Labor	**Roy Schintler**	William Lovell		James Eudey	William Keily (Ind)

== See also ==
- 1958 Victorian Legislative Council election
