= Electoral results for the district of Sunshine =

Victoria, Australia, district election results

This is a list of electoral results for the Electoral district of Sunshine in Victorian state elections.

Sunshine was very safe Labor territory as the ALP has always won the seat with a primary vote.

In fact only on three occasions in 1967, 1992 and 1999 did the Labor primary vote fell below 60%.

Despite 1992 seeing the sitting Labor Government being swept away in a landslide, sitting member Ian Baker only suffered a minor swing against him on the two-party preferred basis.

In 1999, Baker was disendorsed by the ALP and ran unsuccessfully as an independent against the successful Labor candidate Telmo Languiller.

Baker as an independent won 14.2% of the vote and with Languiller winning 58.8% which equalled to more than 70% of the vote.

== Members for Sunshine ==
First incarnation (1945-1955)
Member	Party	Term
Ernie Shepherd	Labor Party	1945–1955
Second incarnation (1967-2002)
Denis Lovegrove	Labor Party	1967–1973
Bill Fogarty	Labor Party	1973–1988
Ian Baker	Labor Party	1988–1999
Telmo Languiller	Labor Party	1999–2002

== Election results ==
=== Elections in the 1990s ===
1999 Victorian state election: Sunshine
Party	Candidate	Votes	%	±%
Labor	Telmo Languiller	19,826	58.8	−8.8
Liberal	Simon Morgan	9,100	27.0	−2.7
Independent	Ian Baker	4,780	14.2	+14.2
Total formal votes		33,706	94.4	−0.8
Informal votes		1,987	5.6	+0.8
Turnout		35,693	92.7	
Two-party-preferred result
Labor	Telmo Languiller	23,643	70.1	+1.0
Liberal	Simon Morgan	10,062	29.9	−1.0
Labor hold		Swing	+1.0	

1996 Victorian state election: Sunshine
Party	Candidate	Votes	%	±%
Labor	Ian Baker	22,038	67.6	+9.0
Liberal	Mark Forytarz	9,665	29.7	+0.9
Natural Law	Paul Treacy	876	2.7	+2.7
Total formal votes		32,579	95.2	+3.0
Informal votes		1,637	4.8	−3.0
Turnout		34,216	92.9	
Two-party-preferred result
Labor	Ian Baker	22,499	69.1	+5.8
Liberal	Mark Forytarz	10,064	30.9	−5.8
Labor hold		Swing	+5.8	

1992 Victorian state election: Sunshine
Party	Candidate	Votes	%	±%
Labor	Ian Baker	17,918	58.7	−2.3
Liberal	Bernard Reilly	8,795	28.8	+0.9
Independent	Marion Martin	1,628	5.3	+5.3
Independent	Charles Skidmore	1,507	4.9	+4.9
Independent	Z. A. Derwinski	684	2.2	+2.2
Total formal votes		30,532	92.2	+1.7
Informal votes		2,583	7.8	−1.7
Turnout		33,115	94.4	
Two-party-preferred result
Labor	Ian Baker	19,296	63.3	−1.7
Liberal	Bernard Reilly	11,172	36.7	+1.7
Labor hold		Swing	−1.7	

=== Elections in the 1980s ===
1988 Victorian state election: Sunshine
Party	Candidate	Votes	%	±%
Labor	Ian Baker	16,285	66.40	−4.67
Liberal	Julie Reid	6,423	26.19	−2.74
Independent	Alan Finch	1,817	7.41	+7.41
Total formal votes		24,525	92.39	−3.15
Informal votes		2,020	7.61	+3.15
Turnout		26,545	90.71	−1.65
Two-party-preferred result
Labor	Ian Baker	17,513	71.49	+0.42
Liberal	Julie Reid	6,984	28.51	−0.42
Labor hold		Swing	+0.42	

1985 Victorian state election: Sunshine
Party	Candidate	Votes	%	±%
Labor	Bill Fogarty	19,032	71.1	−3.2
Liberal	Aldous Hicks	7,748	28.9	+6.8
Total formal votes		26,780	95.5	
Informal votes		1,251	4.5	
Turnout		28,031	92.4	
Labor hold		Swing	−5.1	

1982 Victorian state election: Sunshine
Party	Candidate	Votes	%	±%
Labor	Bill Fogarty	19,848	72.7	+0.6
Liberal	Mario De Bono	6,113	22.4	−0.9
Democrats	Algimantas Kacinskas	1,351	5.0	+0.4
Total formal votes		27,312	94.9	+0.6
Informal votes		1,474	5.1	−0.6
Turnout		28,786	94.8	0.0
Two-party-preferred result
Labor	Bill Fogarty	20,625	75.5	+1.0
Liberal	Mario De Bono	6,687	24.5	−1.0
Labor hold		Swing	+1.0	

=== Elections in the 1970s ===
1979 Victorian state election: Sunshine
Party	Candidate	Votes	%	±%
Labor	Bill Fogarty	19,188	72.1	+7.9
Liberal	Andreas Zafiropoulos	6,198	23.3	−1.9
Democrats	Algimantas Kacinskas	1,232	4.6	+4.6
Total formal votes		26,618	94.3	−1.0
Informal votes		1,620	5.7	+1.0
Turnout		28,238	94.8	+2.9
Two-party-preferred result
Labor	Bill Fogarty	19,832	74.5	+2.9
Liberal	Andreas Zafiropoulos	6,786	25.5	−2.9
Labor hold		Swing	+2.9	

1976 Victorian state election: Sunshine
Party	Candidate	Votes	%	±%
Labor	Bill Fogarty	16,715	64.2	−0.2
Liberal	David More	6,563	25.2	+0.6
Independent	Charles Skidmore	2,771	10.6	+10.6
Total formal votes		26,049	95.3	
Informal votes		1,282	4.7	
Turnout		27,331	91.9	
Two-party-preferred result
Labor	Bill Fogarty	18,651	71.6	+5.9
Liberal	David More	7,398	28.4	−5.9
Labor hold		Swing	+5.9	

1973 Victorian state election: Sunshine
Party	Candidate	Votes	%	±%
Labor	Bill Fogarty	15,362	62.1	+1.3
Liberal	Ian Ryan	6,311	25.5	+2.9
Democratic Labor	Mary Barnes	3,065	12.4	−4.2
Total formal votes		24,738	95.5	+0.6
Informal votes		1,177	4.5	−0.6
Turnout		25,915	93.7	−2.1
Two-party-preferred result
Labor	Bill Fogarty	15,821	64.0	+0.7
Liberal	Ian Ryan	8,917	36.0	−0.7
Labor hold		Swing	+0.7	

1970 Victorian state election: Sunshine
Party	Candidate	Votes	%	±%
Labor	Denis Lovegrove	13,976	60.8	+2.5
Liberal	Vaclav Ubl	5,202	22.6	+1.2
Democratic Labor	Robert Charles	3,808	16.6	+0.1
Total formal votes		22,986	94.9	−0.1
Informal votes		1,241	5.1	+0.1
Turnout		24,227	94.8	+1.7
Two-party-preferred result
Labor	Denis Lovegrove	14,548	63.3	+0.6
Liberal	Vaclav Ubl	8,438	36.7	−0.6
Labor hold		Swing	+0.6	

=== Elections in the 1960s ===
1967 Victorian state election: Sunshine
Party	Candidate	Votes	%	±%
Labor	Denis Lovegrove	13,223	58.3	−6.3
Liberal	Peter Ross	4,863	21.4	+2.5
Democratic Labor	Robert Charles	3,728	16.4	−0.2
Independent	Roy Hartley	854	3.8	+3.8
Total formal votes		22,668	95.0	
Informal votes		1,199	5.0	
Turnout		23,867	93.1	
Two-party-preferred result
Labor	Denis Lovegrove	14,209	62.7	−4.2
Liberal	Peter Ross	8,459	37.3	+4.2
Labor hold		Swing	−4.2	

=== Elections in the 1950s ===
1952 Victorian state election: Sunshine
Party	Candidate	Votes	%	±%
Labor	Ernie Shepherd	unopposed		
Labor hold		Swing		

1950 Victorian state election: Sunshine
Party	Candidate	Votes	%	±%
Labor	Ernie Shepherd	20,369	77.8	+8.8
Liberal and Country	Marguerite James	5,823	22.2	−8.8
Total formal votes		26,192	99.0	0.0
Informal votes		258	1.0	0.0
Turnout		26,450	95.1	+0.8
Labor hold		Swing	+8.8	

=== Elections in the 1940s ===
1947 Victorian state election: Sunshine
Party	Candidate	Votes	%	±%
Labor	Ernie Shepherd	16,474	69.0	−31.0
Liberal	Lindsay Smith	7,416	31.0	+31.0
Total formal votes		23,890	99.0	
Informal votes		238	1.0	
Turnout		24,128	94.3	
Labor hold		Swing	N/A	

1945 Victorian state election: Sunshine
Party	Candidate	Votes	%	±%
Labor	Ernie Shepherd	unopposed		
Labor hold		Swing		
