= Electoral results for the district of Moonee Ponds =

Australian district election results

This is a list of electoral results for the electoral district of Moonee Ponds in Victorian state elections.

== Members for Moonee Ponds ==
Member	Party	Term
Samuel Merrifield	Labor	1945–1955
Jack Holden	Liberal	1955–1967
Tom Edmunds	Labor	1967–1976

== Election results ==
=== Elections in the 1970s ===
1973 Victorian state election: Moonee Ponds
Party	Candidate	Votes	%	±%
Labor	Tom Edmunds	12,991	54.1	+1.5
Liberal	William Lawrence	8,282	34.5	+2.1
Democratic Labor	Michael McMahon	2,758	11.5	−3.6
Total formal votes		24,031	95.9	−0.2
Informal votes		1,017	4.1	+0.2
Turnout		25,048	94.5	−0.7
Two-party-preferred result
Labor	Tom Edmunds	13,405	55.8	+1.0
Liberal	William Lawrence	10,626	44.2	−1.0
Labor hold		Swing	+1.0	

1970 Victorian state election: Moonee Ponds
Party	Candidate	Votes	%	±%
Labor	Tom Edmunds	12,146	52.6	+5.0
Liberal	John Williams	7,485	32.4	−0.1
Democratic Labor	Barry O'Brien	3,479	15.0	0.0
Total formal votes		23,110	96.1	0.0
Informal votes		934	3.9	0.0
Turnout		24,044	95.2	+1.0
Two-party-preferred result
Labor	Tom Edmunds	12,668	54.8	+3.5
Liberal	John Williams	10,442	45.2	−3.5
Labor hold		Swing	+3.5	

=== Elections in the 1960s ===
1967 Victorian state election: Moonee Ponds
Party	Candidate	Votes	%	±%
Labor	Tom Edmunds	11,280	47.6	+1.4
Liberal	Jack Holden	7,716	32.5	−3.4
Democratic Labor	Barry O'Brien	3,554	15.0	−2.8
Independent	Lancelot Hutchinson	1,165	4.9	+4.9
Total formal votes		23,715	96.1	
Informal votes		960	3.9	
Turnout		24,675	94.2	
Two-party-preferred result
Labor	Tom Edmunds	12,168	51.3	+4.2
Liberal	Jack Holden	11,547	48.7	−4.2
Labor gain from Liberal		Swing	+4.2	

1964 Victorian state election: Moonee Ponds
Party	Candidate	Votes	%	±%
Labor	Tom Edmunds	7,903	43.3	+1.8
Liberal and Country	Jack Holden	7,293	39.9	+1.1
Democratic Labor	Barry O'Brien	3,078	16.8	−1.3
Total formal votes		18,274	97.4	+0.2
Informal votes		481	2.6	−0.2
Turnout		18,755	93.9	−0.7
Two-party-preferred result
Liberal and Country	Jack Holden	10,224	56.0	+0.1
Labor	Tom Edmunds	8,050	44.0	−0.1
Liberal and Country hold		Swing	+0.1	

1961 Victorian state election: Moonee Ponds
Party	Candidate	Votes	%	±%
Labor	Tom Edmunds	7,724	41.5	+3.8
Liberal and Country	Jack Holden	7,222	38.8	−3.1
Democratic Labor	Paul Gunn	3,360	18.1	−0.3
Independent	Peter Kirchner	306	1.6	+1.6
Total formal votes		18,612	97.2	−1.1
Informal votes		529	2.8	+1.1
Turnout		19,141	94.6	−0.3
Two-party-preferred result
Liberal and Country	Jack Holden	10,406	55.9	−4.5
Labor	Tom Edmunds	8,206	44.1	+4.5
Liberal and Country hold		Swing	−4.5	

=== Elections in the 1950s ===
1958 Victorian state election: Moonee Ponds
Party	Candidate	Votes	%	±%
Liberal and Country	Jack Holden	8,128	41.9	
Labor	Thomas Moloney	7,306	37.7	
Democratic Labor	Paul Gunn	3,565	18.4	
Independent	Lancelot Hutchinson	379	2.0	
Total formal votes		19,378	98.3	
Informal votes		328	1.7	
Turnout		19,706	94.9	
Two-party-preferred result
Liberal and Country	Jack Holden	11,694	60.4	
Labor	Thomas Moloney	7,684	39.6	
Liberal and Country hold		Swing		

1955 Victorian state election: Moonee Ponds
Party	Candidate	Votes	%	±%
Labor	Samuel Merrifield	9,389	46.0	
Liberal and Country	Jack Holden	6,846	33.5	
Labor (A-C)	Harold Hilbert	4,167	20.4	
Total formal votes		20,402	98.7	
Informal votes		272	1.3	
Turnout		20,674	93.9	
Two-party-preferred result
Liberal and Country	Jack Holden	10,633	52.1	
Labor	Samuel Merrifield	9,769	47.9	
Liberal and Country gain from Labor		Swing		

1952 Victorian state election: Moonee Ponds
Party	Candidate	Votes	%	±%
Labor	Samuel Merrifield	unopposed		
Labor hold		Swing		

1950 Victorian state election: Moonee Ponds
Party	Candidate	Votes	%	±%
Labor	Samuel Merrifield	14,073	56.0	+1.2
Liberal and Country	John Rossiter	7,902	31.4	−13.8
Independent	Brian O'Callaghan	3,154	12.6	+12.6
Total formal votes		25,129	99.1	0.0
Informal votes		228	0.9	0.0
Turnout		25,357	95.4	+0.5
Two-party-preferred result
Labor	Samuel Merrifield	14,388	57.2	+2.4
Liberal and Country	John Rossiter	10,741	42.8	−2.4
Labor hold		Swing	+2.4	

=== Elections in the 1940s ===
1947 Victorian state election: Moonee Ponds
Party	Candidate	Votes	%	±%
Labor	Samuel Merrifield	13,982	54.8	−45.2
Liberal	Wallace Crichton	11,534	45.2	+45.2
Total formal votes		25,516	99.1	
Informal votes		229	0.9	
Turnout		25,745	94.9	
Labor hold		Swing	N/A	

1945 Victorian state election: Moonee Ponds
Party	Candidate	Votes	%	±%
Labor	Samuel Merrifield	unopposed		
Labor hold		Swing		
