= Electoral results for the district of Yarraville =

Victoria, Australia, district election results

This is a list of electoral results for the electoral district of Yarraville in Victorian state elections.

== Members for Yarraville ==
Member	Party	Term
Roy Schintler	Labor	1958–1967

== Election results ==
=== Elections in the 1960s ===
1964 Victorian state election: Yarraville
Party	Candidate	Votes	%	±%
Labor	Roy Schintler	12,694	65.2	−1.9
Democratic Labor	Alfred Gerrard	3,605	18.5	−3.9
Liberal and Country	Bernard Wallace	3,184	16.3	+5.8
Total formal votes		19,483	96.5	0.0
Informal votes		703	3.5	0.0
Turnout		20,186	94.9	−0.1
Two-party-preferred result
Labor	Roy Schintler	13,234	67.9	−2.6
Liberal and Country	Bernard Wallace	6,249	32.1	+2.6
Labor hold		Swing	−2.6	

- The two candidate preferred vote was not counted between the Labor and DLP candidates for Yarraville.

1961 Victorian state election: Yarraville
Party	Candidate	Votes	%	±%
Labor	Roy Schintler	13,459	67.1	+4.4
Democratic Labor	Alfred Gerrard	4,488	22.4	+8.7
Liberal and Country	Neal Grieg	2,100	10.5	+1.2
Total formal votes		20,047	96.5	−1.2
Informal votes		718	3.5	+1.2
Turnout		20,765	95.0	−0.2
Two-party-preferred result
Labor	Roy Schintler	14,133	70.5	−7.1
Liberal and Country	Neal Grieg	5,914	29.5	+7.1
Labor hold		Swing	−7.1	

- The two candidate preferred vote was not counted between the Labor and DLP candidates for Yarraville.

=== Elections in the 1950s ===
1958 Victorian state election: Yarraville
Party	Candidate	Votes	%	±%
Labor	Roy Schintler	12,751	62.7	
Independent	William Keily	2,916	14.3	
Democratic Labor	James Eudey	2,782	13.7	
Liberal and Country	William Lovell	1,901	9.3	
Total formal votes		20,350	97.7	
Informal votes		484	2.3	
Turnout		20,834	95.2	
Two-party-preferred result
Labor	Roy Schintler	15,792	77.6	
Liberal and Country	William Lovell	4,558	22.4	
Labor hold		Swing		

- Two party preferred vote was estimated.
