= Electoral results for the district of Ascot Vale =

Australian district election results

This is a list of electoral results for the electoral district of Ascot Vale in Victorian state elections.

== Members for Ascot Vale ==
First incarnation (1955–1958)
| Member | Party | Term |
|---|---|---|
| Ernie Shepherd | Labor | 1955–1958 |

Second incarnation (1976–1985)
| Member | Party | Term |
|---|---|---|
| Tom Edmunds | Labor | 1976–1985 |

== Election results ==
=== Elections in the 1980s ===
1982 Victorian state election: Ascot Vale
| Party | Candidate | Votes | % | ±% |
|---|---|---|---|---|
| Labor | Tom Edmunds | 17,797 | 71.7 | +3.4 |
| Liberal | David Hayward | 7,012 | 28.3 | −3.4 |
| Total formal votes | | 24,809 | 95.4 | +0.2 |
| Informal votes | | 1,190 | 4.6 | −0.2 |
| Turnout | | 25,999 | 93.7 | +1.2 |
| Labor hold | | Swing | +3.4 | |

=== Elections in the 1970s ===
1979 Victorian state election: Ascot Vale
| Party | Candidate | Votes | % | ±% |
|---|---|---|---|---|
| Labor | Tom Edmunds | 16,901 | 68.3 | +5.0 |
| Liberal | Murray Kellam | 7,859 | 31.7 | −5.0 |
| Total formal votes | | 24,760 | 95.2 | −0.9 |
| Informal votes | | 1,241 | 4.8 | +0.9 |
| Turnout | | 26,001 | 92.5 | +0.1 |
| Labor hold | | Swing | +5.0 | |

1976 Victorian state election: Ascot Vale
| Party | Candidate | Votes | % | ±% |
|---|---|---|---|---|
| Labor | Tom Edmunds | 16,445 | 63.3 | +3.9 |
| Liberal | Edmond Murphy | 9,535 | 36.7 | +5.9 |
| Total formal votes | | 25,980 | 96.1 | |
| Informal votes | | 1,043 | 3.9 | |
| Turnout | | 27,023 | 92.4 | |
| Labor hold | | Swing | +2.9 | |

=== Elections in the 1950s ===
1955 Victorian state election: Ascot Vale
| Party | Candidate | Votes | % | ±% |
|---|---|---|---|---|
| Labor | Ernie Shepherd | 14,351 | 66.4 | |
| Liberal and Country | George Evans | 4,091 | 18.9 | |
| Labor (A-C) | Paul Gunn | 3,168 | 14.7 | |
| Total formal votes | | 21,610 | 98.2 | |
| Informal votes | | 399 | 1.8 | |
| Turnout | | 22,009 | 94.9 | |
Two-party-preferred result
| Labor | Ernie Shepherd | 14,826 | 68.6 | |
| Liberal and Country | George Evans | 6,784 | 31.4 | |
| Labor hold | | Swing | | |
