= 1958 Victorian state election =

Australian state election

- 31 May 1958

All 66 seats in the Victorian Legislative Assembly 34 seats needed for a majority
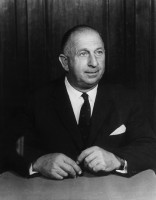

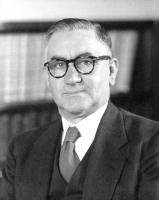

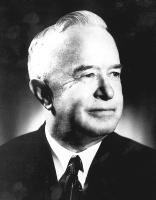
	First party	Second party	Third party
Leader	Henry Bolte	Ernie Shepherd	Herbert Hyland
Party	Liberal and Country	Labor	Country
Leader since	3 June 1953	9 August 1957	20 April 1955
Leader's seat	Hampden	Footscray	Gippsland South
Last election	33	20	11
Seats won	39	18	9
Seat change	▲6	▼2	▼2
Popular vote	508,678	515,638	127,228
Percentage	37.18%	37.69%	9.30%
Swing	▼0.60	▲5.12	▼0.24
TPP	57.76%	42.24%
TPP swing	▼0.16	▲0.16
Premier before election
Henry Bolte
Liberal and Country
Elected Premier
Henry Bolte
Liberal and Country

Elections were held in the Australian state of Victoria on Saturday 31 May 1958 to elect the 66 members of the state's Legislative Assembly. This was the last time Assembly elections were held separately from those for the Legislative Council.

The Liberal and Country Party (LCP) government of Premier Henry Bolte won a second term in office.

== Results ==
=== Legislative Assembly ===
Victorian state election, 31 May 1958 Legislative Assembly << 1955–1961 >>
Enrolled voters	1,478,065				
Votes cast	1,392,813		Turnout	94.23	+0.21
Informal votes	24,760		Informal	1.78	-0.42
Summary of votes by party
Party	Primary votes	%	Swing	Seats	Change
Labor	515,638	37.69	+5.12	18	−2
Liberal and Country	508,678	37.18	-0.60	39	+6
Democratic Labor	197,380	14.43	+1.82	0	−1
Country	127,228	9.30	-0.24	9	−2
Independent	17,770	1.30	-2.23	0	−1
Other	1,359	0.10	-0.40	0	±0
Total	1,368,053			66	
Two-party-preferred
Liberal and Country	790,149	57.8	–0.1		
Labor	577,904	42.2	+0.1		

== Seats changing party representation ==
There was a redistribution across Victoria prior to this election. The seat changes are as follows.

=== Abolished seats ===
Seat	Incumbent member	Party
Ascot Vale	Ernie Shepherd	Labor
Carlton	Denis Lovegrove	Labor
Caulfield East	Alexander Fraser	Liberal and Country
Collingwood	Bill Towers	Labor
Pascoe Vale	Arthur Drakeford	Labor
Port Melbourne	Archie Todd	Labor

=== New seats ===
Seat	Party	Elected member
Essendon	Liberal and Country	Kenneth Wheeler
Fitzroy	Labor	Denis Lovegrove
Mulgrave	Liberal and Country	Ray Wiltshire
Ormond	Liberal and Country	Joe Rafferty
Ringwood	Liberal and Country	Jim Manson
Yarraville	Labor	Roy Schintler

=== Seats changing hands ===
Seat	Incumbent member	Party	New member	Party
Bendigo	John Stanistreet	Liberal and Country	Bill Galvin	Labor
Coburg	Charlie Mutton	Independent	Charlie Mutton	Labor
Evelyn	Phillip Connell	Labor	Russell Stokes	Liberal and Country
Geelong West	Colin MacDonald	Labor	Max Gillett	Liberal and Country
Richmond	Frank Scully	Democratic Labor	Bill Towers	Labor

== See also ==
- Candidates of the 1958 Victorian state election
- 1958 Victorian Legislative Council election
