= Alexander McDonald (1845–1920) =

Alexander McDonald (1845 - 26 May 1920) was an Australian politician. He was a liberal member of the Victorian Legislative Assembly from 1902 to 1904, representing the electorate of Footscray.

McDonald was born in Inverness, Scotland and migrated to Victoria with his family in 1854, settling in Footscray, where he remained for the rest of his life. He was a contractor by trade, working as a carpenter on the Williamstown railway line and Bendigo railway line then as a builder at Footscray. He was a City of Footscray councillor from 1893 until his death and was mayor in 1901-02 and 1911-12.

McDonald was elected to the Legislative Assembly at a June 1902 by-election, defeating John Lemmon by 38 votes. The Footscray seat was abolished for the 1904 election, and McDonald instead unsuccessfully contested Flemington.

McDonald died at his home in Albert Street, Footscray, in 1920 and was buried at the Footscray Cemetery. Upon his death, The Independent described him as "perhaps the best-known figure in the district".

Victorian Legislative Assembly
Preceded by Jacob Fotheringham	Member for Footscray; 1902–1904	Succeeded by Electorate abolished
