= Bill Fogarty =

Australian politician (1922–2001)

William Francis "Bill" Fogarty
- Born: 1 June 1922; Birth place: Kingsville
- Died: 31 July 2001 (aged 79); Death Place: Spotswood
- Known for: Politician
- Term: 1973–1988
- Predecessor: Denis Lovegrove
- Successor: Ian Baker
- Spouse: Olive Mildred Mcintosh until Fogarty's death in 2001
- Children: 2

William Francis "Bill" Fogarty (1 June 1922 – 13 July 2001) was an Australian politician.

Fogarty was born in Kingsville, and served in the Royal Australian Navy from 1940 to 1946 as a signalman. From 1946 to 1954, he was a metalworker, subsequently working as an official in the Cold Storage and Meat Preserving Employees' Union from 1954 to 1972; he was federal secretary from 1965 to 1973. On 9 June 1945, he married Olive Mildred McIntosh; they had two children. From 1960 to 1972, he was a Footscray City Councillor, serving as mayor from 1963 to 1964.

In 1973, Fogarty was elected to the Victorian Legislative Assembly as the Labor member for Sunshine, where he became the parliamentary spokesman on agriculture until 1982. He retired from politics in 1988 and died in Spotswood in 2001.

Victorian Legislative Assembly
Preceded by Denis Lovegrove	Member for Sunshine; 1973–1988	Succeeded by Ian Baker
