= Jacob Fotheringham =

Australian politician (1865–1924)

Jacob Fotheringham (19 October 1865 – 20 June 1924) was an Australian politician. He was a liberal member of the Victorian Legislative Assembly from 1901 to 1902, representing the electorate of Footscray.

Fotheringham was born in Sebastopol, near Ballarat, and moved to Footscray with his family at the age of seven. He was educated at Hyde Street State School and Carlton College before leaving school at the age of 14. He worked for the firms of Patterson, Laing and Bruce and then Brooks, McGlashan and McClarg, rising through the ranks of the latter, and listed his profession as "salesman" at the time of his election. He held a series of prominent sporting roles: treasurer of the Footscray Football Club, secretary of the Footscray Rowing Club and secretary of the Victorian Football Association, and was heavily involved in the local branches of the Australian Natives Association.

Fotheringham was elected to the Legislative Assembly at a 1901 by-election for the seat of Footscray following Samuel Mauger's resignation to enter the inaugural federal parliament, winning by only 45 votes. During the campaign, he had declared that he was a "thorough protectionist", supported reform of the state parliament in light of Federation, opposed rural malapportionment of parliamentary seats, supported women's suffrage, and advocated for uniform national factory legislation. However, several months later, he moved to Sydney for business interests, and belatedly resigned his seat in May 1902 following criticism for not having done so sooner given that he had permanently moved out of the state.

Following his resignation, Fotheringham managed the millinery department for Sydney softgoods business W & A McArthur Ltd, and later became the firm's resident buyer in London. On 25 February 1917, he was on board the Cunard liner Laconia when it was torpedoed by German forces off the coast of Ireland during World War I with many fatalities. He was rescued after ten hours in a lifeboat, and was widely interviewed (including by The New York Times) about the horrors of the sinking. He contracted tuberculosis following the incident, which negatively affected his health for the rest of his life. In 1918, he was manager of the Australian Straw Hat Factory. In 1922, he went into business on his own, establishing millinery manufacturing and importing firm Fotheringhams Ltd., which he operated until his death.

Fotheringham died at his home in the Sydney suburb of Mosman in 1924 and was buried at the Northern Suburbs Cemetery (now Macquarie Park Cemetery and Crematorium).

Victorian Legislative Assembly
Preceded by Samuel Mauger	Member for Footscray; 1901–1902	Succeeded by Alexander McDonald
