= Robert Fordham =

Australian politician

The Honourable Robert Fordham AM

21st Deputy Premier of Victoria
- In office 8 April 1982 – 31 January 1989
- Premier: John Cain Jr.
- Preceded by: Bill Borthwick
- Succeeded by: Joan Kirner

Member of the Victorian Legislative Assembly for Footscray
- In office 30 May 1970 – 3 October 1992
- Preceded by: Bill Divers
- Succeeded by: Bruce Mildenhall

Personal details
- Born: Robert Clive Fordham; 10 February 1942 (age 84) Melbourne, Victoria, Australia
- Party: Labor Party
- Spouse: Susan Edna Wills (m. 1967)
- Education: University of Melbourne
- Occupation: Accountant, public servant

Robert Clive Fordham AM (born 10 February 1942) is an Australian former politician, who was a member of the Victorian Legislative Assembly representing the state seat of Footscray for the Labor Party from 1970 to 1992. He was Deputy Premier of Victoria in John Cain's government from 1982 to 1989.

== Early life and education ==
Fordham was born in Melbourne and attended Footscray North Primary School and Essendon High School before studying commerce and arts at the University of Melbourne. He worked as an accountant, and joined the Commonwealth Public Service Board in 1968. He is the brother of Jan Friedl (1947–2017), an actress known for her work as Matron Gribble on Round the Twist.

== Political career ==
Fordham unsuccessfully ran as a candidate for the electorate of Syndal in the 1967 Victorian election, but was elected as member for Footscray in the subsequent election in 1970. In that same year, he was made parliamentary spokesperson on fuel, power and the arts; later, for education and federal affairs. In 1977, he was made deputy leader of the Labor Party in Victoria and deputy opposition leader under Frank Wilkes and John Cain.

In the 1982 election, John Cain led Labor to victory after thirty years in opposition. Fordham became Deputy Premier, and was also given the portfolios of education and educational services in Cain's cabinet. After the 1985 election, Fordham and Ian Cathie swapped portfolios, with Fordham becoming Minister for Industry, Technology and Resources.

=== VEDC affair ===
As industry minister, Fordham oversaw the operation of the Victorian Economic Development Corporation (VEDC), a government agency originally established by Rupert Hamer's Liberal government in 1981, but which was restructured by the Labor government in 1984 to stimulate economic activity in Victoria by providing loan and equity funds to certain companies. In October 1987, the VEDC became involved in the proposed public float of Wallace International, a pharmaceutical company. Despite a global stock market slump following "Black Monday", Wallace proceeded with its float, which then failed, causing the float's underwriters to withdraw from their commitment. In early November 1987, Wallace applied to the VEDC to sub-underwrite the float, and received correspondence from Fordham agreeing to the VEDC acting as sub-underwriter, making further loans to the company, and purchasing $2 million worth of shares.

By the close of the float in January 1989, Wallace's failure to attract investors saw the company call up the VEDC's sub-underwriting agreement in February. The VEDC board met on 19 February, where they were informed of Fordham's agreement with the company for the first time, which it was required to endorse. Despite the funding injection from VEDC, Wallace recorded a loss of around $17.5 million, and in November 1988 the VEDC instituted legal action alleging misleading and deceptive conduct, and seeking the recovery of the $15 million it had invested.

The problems continued with several other VEDC clients going into receivership. The opposition seized upon the agency's failures, and called for Fordham's resignation and a royal commission into the affair. The government appointed accountant Fergus Ryan to conduct an inquiry into the VEDC's finances, management and investments. Ryan's report was released on 21 December 1988, finding that the VEDC had accumulated bad debts of $112 million. Fordham's appointments to the VEDC board were criticised, as were his agreements with Wallace which were seen to have caused the agency to have "entered into an agreement beyond its powers". An election had been held in October 1988 in which Cain's government had been re-elected, losing one lower house seat and control of the upper house. Cain re-shuffled his cabinet, moving Fordham to the Agriculture and Rural Affairs, and Arts portfolios.

Despite further opposition pressure over the VEDC affair, and speculation that Fordham would be forced to resign, Premier Cain backed his deputy, as did the Labor Unity faction of which Fordham was a member. During January, however, Fordham's support within the party dissipated. In particular, the Socialist Left faction had a cross-faction agreement to provide the next deputy premier, and worked actively to force Fordham to resign. He stood down on 31 January 1989, and a week later the caucus elected Joan Kirner to replace him as Deputy Premier.

Fordham served out the rest of his parliamentary term on the backbench, and did not contest the 1992 election.

== After politics ==
Since leaving politics, Fordham has worked as a consultant and has been active in several organisations in the East Gippsland region, including as Chairperson of East Gippsland Water and a council member of East Gippsland Institute of TAFE. Fordham was Chairman of Gippland Development Ltd from its inception in the mid-1990s.

Fordham was made a Member of the Order of Australia (AM) in the 2013 Australia Day Honours "For significant service to the Parliament of Victoria, to education, to the Anglican Church in Australia, and to tourism and economic development."

Victorian Legislative Assembly
Preceded by Bill Divers	Member for Footscray; 1970–1992	Succeeded by Bruce Mildenhall
Political offices
Preceded by Bill Borthwick	Deputy Premier of Victoria; 1982–1989	Succeeded by Joan Kirner
Preceded by Alan Hunt	Minister of Education; 1982–1985	Succeeded by Ian Cathie
Preceded by Norman Lacy	Minister of Educational Services; 1982–1984	Succeeded by [abolished]
Preceded by Ian Cathie	Minister for Industry, Technology and Resources; 1985–1988	Succeeded by Evan Walker
Preceded by Evan Walker	Minister for Agriculture and Rural Affairs; 1988–1989	Succeeded by Barry Pullen
Preceded by Race Mathews	Minister for the Arts; 1988–1989	Succeeded by Barry Pullen
