= Bruce Mildenhall =

Australian politician

The Honourable Bruce Mildenhall MP

Member of the Victorian Legislative Assembly for Footscray
- In office 3 October 1992 – 25 November 2006
- Preceded by: Robert Fordham
- Succeeded by: Marsha Thompson

Mayor of the City of Footscray
- In office 1987–1988

Councillor of the City of Footscray
- In office 1982–1991

Personal details
- Born: 27 March 1953 (age 73) Box Hill, Victoria, Australia
- Party: Labor
- Education: La Trobe University (BA)
- Occupation: Public servant Youth worker

Bruce Allan Mildenhall (born 27 March 1953 in Box Hill, Melbourne) is a retired Australian politician and a former member of the Victorian Legislative Assembly for the electoral district of Footscray.

Mildenhall was a youth worker, recreation officer and public servant before being elected to the Legislative Assembly for Footscray in October 1992. He held a number of shadow ministries until 1999 and was a parliamentary secretary until 2006.

Mildenhall retired from the Legislative Assembly at the 2006 state election.

Victorian Legislative Assembly
Preceded by Robert Fordham	Member for Footscray; 1992–2006	Succeeded by Marsha Thomson
