= Marsha Thomson =

Australian politician (born 1955)

The Honourable Marsha Thomson
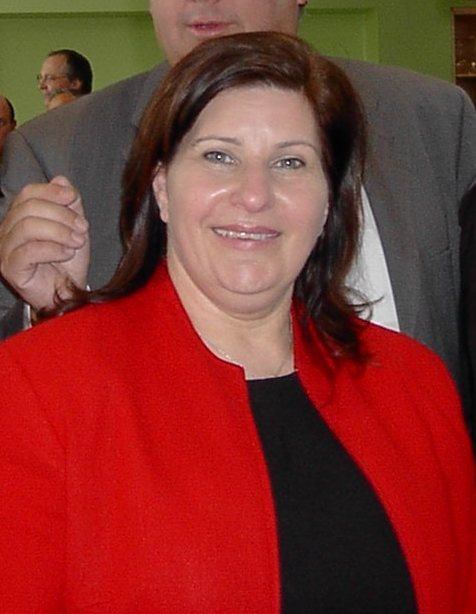

Member of the Victorian Legislative Assembly for Footscray
- In office 25 November 2006 – 24 November 2018
- Preceded by: Bruce Mildenhall
- Succeeded by: Katie Hall

Personal details
- Born: 21 December 1955 (age 70) Pascoe Vale, Victoria, Australia
- Party: Labor Party
- Spouse: Kelvin Thomson
- Children: Two
- Occupation: Political advisor

Marsha Rose Thomson (born 21 December 1955) is an Australian politician. She was a member of the Victorian Legislative Assembly, representing the electoral district of Footscray for the Labor Party from 2006 to 2018; she previously served in the Victorian Legislative Council from 1999 to 2006. She was the first female Jewish minister in Australia.

== Career ==
Thomson was an economic research officer, ministerial adviser, Implementation Manager with V/Line and Executive Officer of Youth Policy Development Council before being elected to the Legislative Council for Melbourne North Province in September 1999.

She was Minister for Consumer Affairs 1999–2002 and Minister for Small Business 1999–2005. She was Minister for Information and Communication Technology from February 2002 and Minister for Consumer Affairs from January 2005, until 2006.

Due to the Upper House reforms, her former electorate of Melbourne North Province was abolished. As a result of Bruce Mildenhall's retirement from politics, Thomson ran for and won his electorate of Footscray at the 2006 State Election. She was Parliamentary Secretary to the Premier and Parliamentary Secretary for the Arts until the 2010 state election.

== Personal life ==
Thomson was married to federal Labor MP Kelvin Thomson and they have two children. They separated in 2003.

Victorian Legislative Council
Preceded by Don Nardella	Member for Melbourne North Province; 1999–2006	Province abolished
Victorian Legislative Assembly
Preceded by Bruce Mildenhall	Member for Footscray; 2006–2018	Succeeded by Katie Hall
Political offices
New ministerial post	Minister for Consumer Affairs; 1999–2002	Succeeded by John Lenders
Preceded by Louise Asher	Minister for Small Business; 1999–2005	Succeeded by Andre Haermeyer
New ministerial post	Minister for Information and Communication Technology; 2002–2006	Succeeded by Tim Holding
Preceded by John Lenders	Minister for Consumer Affairs; 2005–2006	Succeeded by Daniel Andrews
