= Electoral district of Sunshine =

Former state electoral district of Victoria, Australia

Coordinates: 37°47′S 144°50′E

Sunshine Victoria—Legislative Assembly
- State: Victoria
- Dates current: 1945–1955, 1967–2002
- Namesake: Suburb of Sunshine
- Demographic: Metropolitan

The electoral district of Sunshine was an electoral district of the Legislative Assembly in the Australian state of Victoria.

== Members for Sunshine ==
First incarnation (1945–1955)
Member	Party	Term
Ernie Shepherd	Labor	1945–1955
Second incarnation (1967–2002)
Denis Lovegrove	Labor	1967–1973
Bill Fogarty	Labor	1973–1988
Ian Baker	Labor	1988–1999
Ian Baker	Independent	1999
Telmo Languiller	Labor	1999–2002
