= The Independent (Footscray) =

Former newspaper in Melbourne, Victoria

Page 1, Number 1 of The Independent

The Independent was an Australian newspaper published in Footscray, Melbourne, Victoria from 1883 to 1933.

== History ==
The Independent was first published on Saturday 31 March 1883 in Nicholson Street, Footscray. It described itself as a local newspaper for Footscray, Yarraville, Braybrook, Wyndham and The Plains. It was published each Saturday and cost 1 penny.
