= Katie Hall (Australian politician) =

Australian politician

Katie Hall MP
- Hall in 2026

Member of the Victorian Legislative Assembly for Footscray
- Incumbent
- Assumed office 24 November 2018
- Preceded by: Marsha Thomson

Personal details
- Born: 1981 or 1982 (age 43–44)
- Party: Labor Party
- Website: www.katiehallmp.com.au

Kathryn Ann Hall is an Australian politician serving as the elected member for the Electoral district of Footscray in the Victorian Legislative Assembly since 2018. She is a member of the Australian Labor Party. Hall is a sixth-generation resident of Melbourne’s inner west and a mother of two.

== Early career ==
After majoring in Sociology at Monash University, Hall was a corporate communications specialist, working at the ACTU, DonateLife, Victoria Police, City of Melbourne, and the North East Link Authority.

Hall was also an advisor to former Federal Attorney-General, Nicola Roxon, and worked for former Prime Minister, Julia Gillard.

== Political career ==
Hall was elected as member for Footscray at the 2018 Victorian state election after the retirement of Marsha Thomson, the former member for the district.

Hall has held the role of Parliamentary Secretary for Homes since December 2024 and Parliamentary Secretary for Creative Industries since June 2022. Previously, she was Parliamentary Secretary for Youth, Multicultural Affairs, Early Childhood, and Housing.

Originally a member of the Labor Right, Hall defected to the Labor Left along with six of her colleagues shortly after the 2022 Victorian state election; the defections meant that Labor Left constituted a majority of the state Labor caucus.

Hall was re-elected to a second term as the member for Footscray at the 2022 state election, defeating the Greens candidate Elena Pereyra.

== Political views ==
Hall is a member of Parliamentary Friends of Palestine and Labor for Housing.

Parliament of Victoria
Preceded by Marsha Thomson	Member for Footscray; 2018–present	Incumbent
