= Samuel Mauger =

Australian politician (1857-1936)

The Honourable Samuel Mauger
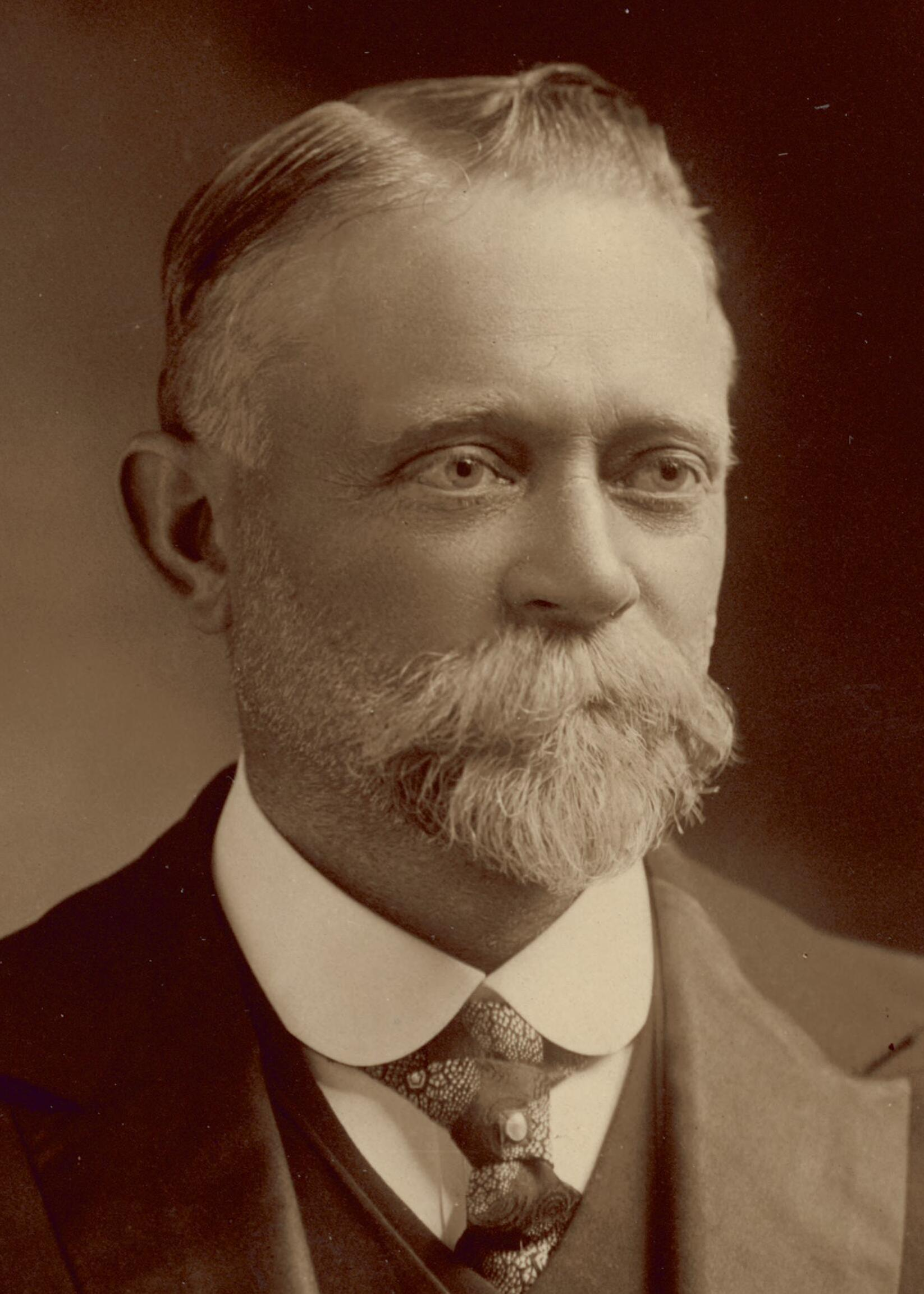
- Mauger, 1910s

Postmaster-General of Australia
- In office 30 July 1907 – 13 November 1908
- Prime Minister: Alfred Deakin
- Preceded by: Austin Chapman
- Succeeded by: Josiah Thomas

Member of the Australian Parliament for Maribyrnong
- In office 12 December 1906 – 13 April 1910
- Preceded by: New seat
- Succeeded by: James Fenton

Member of the Australian Parliament for Melbourne Ports
- In office 29 March 1901 – 12 December 1906
- Preceded by: New seat
- Succeeded by: James Mathews

Personal details
- Born: 12 November 1857 Geelong, Victoria, Australia
- Died: 26 June 1936 (aged 78) Elsternwick, Victoria, Australia
- Party: Protectionist (1901–09); Liberal (1909–10)
- Spouse: Hanna Rice (m. 1880)
- Occupation: Hat manufacturer

Samuel Mauger (pronounced "major"; 12 November 1857 – 26 June 1936) was an Australian social reformer and politician. He served in the Victorian Legislative Assembly (1900–1901) and the Australian House of Representatives (1901–1910), including as Postmaster-General in the Deakin government (1907–1908). He championed a number of political causes, including workers' rights, protectionism and temperance.

== Early life ==
Mauger was born in Geelong, Victoria, son of immigrants from Guernsey, Channel Islands, Samuel Mauger Senior and Caroline née Liz who migrated to Australia in the 1850s. Mauger junior was educated at the Geelong National School, but left school early to become an errand boy for a hat maker when his father contracted rheumatic fever. Mauger later owned the hat manufacturing business. Mauger was a Bible class teacher at St Mark's Church of England in Fitzroy. He later became the Sunday-school superintendent at St Paul's Congregational Church in North Fitzroy. On 13 May 1880, Mauger married Hanna Rice, whom he had met at St Mark's; they eventually had four sons and four daughters.

== Career ==
Mauger held various memberships to various organisations. He was a superintendent in the Fire Brigades' Association of Victoria and four times president of the Metropolitan Fire Brigades Board. Mauger was one of the founders and secretary of the National Anti-Sweating League from 1895. Mauger was on the Board enquiry for unemployment in 1899 and involved in the royal commission of Victorian factories and shops law in 1900.

Being a devout Christian of the Australian Church, Mauger was president of YMCA and president of the Melbourne Total Abstinence Society.

== Victorian politics ==
Mauger attempted to run for politics in various State electorates before becoming a Member of Parliament. He stood for the seat of Fitzroy in 1892, South Melbourne in 1896 and Portland in 1897. In 1899 he was a firefighter in the Melbourne suburb of Richmond. In 1900, Mauger was elected to the Victorian Legislative Assembly seat of Footscray. He held the seat of Footscray until May 1901, where he resigned from State politics and ran for Federal politics.

== Federal politics ==
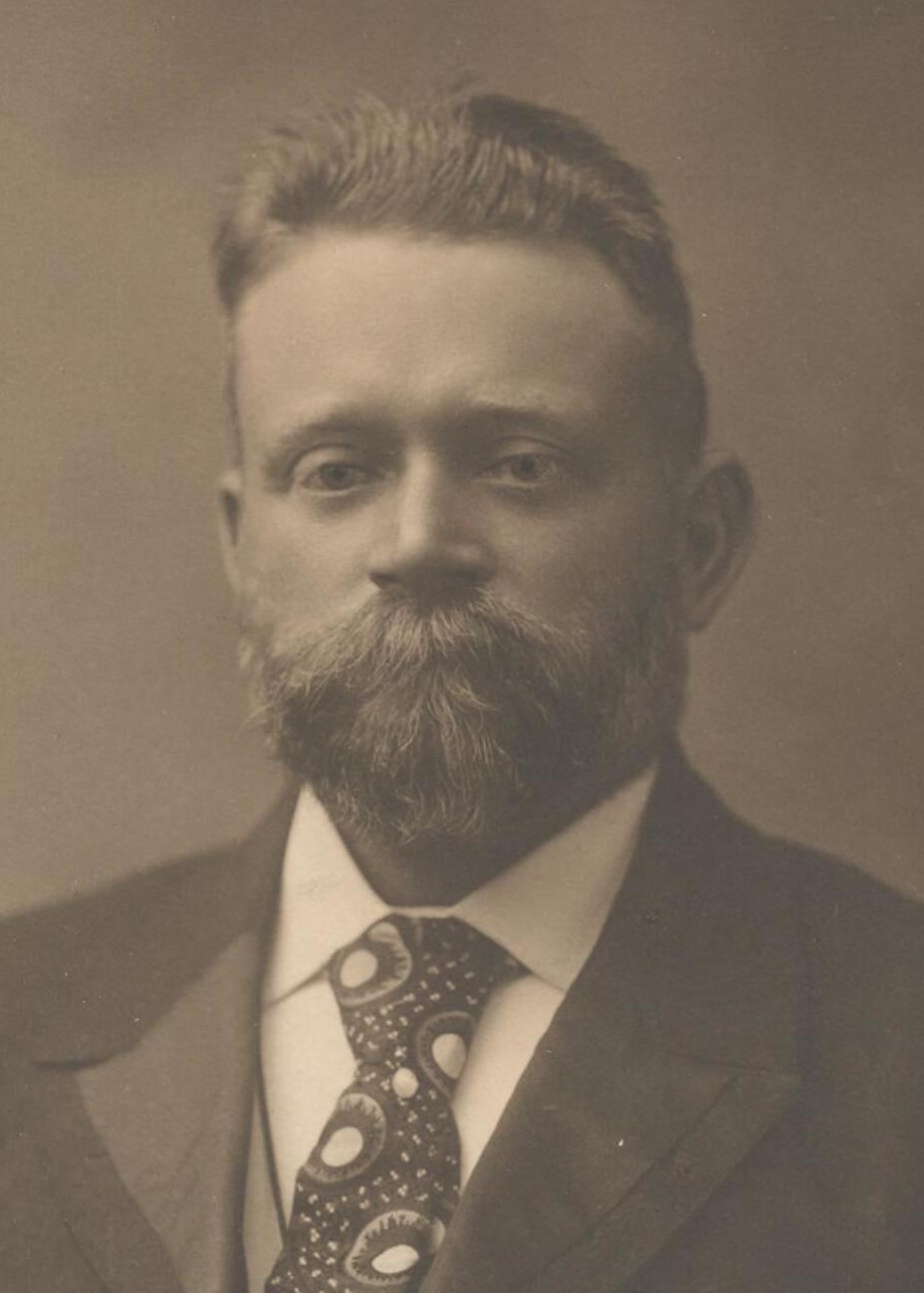
Studio portrait by Swiss Studios

Mauger served as the member for Melbourne Ports from 1901 to 1906. At the 1906 federal election, Mauger contested the newly created seat of Maribyrnong and became the electorate's first Federal Member of Parliament. He was a Minister without a Portfolio from 1906 until 1907 and then Postmaster-General until 1908. Mauger lost his seat of Maribyrnong to ALP candidate James Fenton in 1910.

Mauger ran for the Senate in 1913 and 1914, but failed to get elected.

== Legacy ==
In 1934 Mauger wrote a brochure on The Rise and Progress of the Metropolitan Fire Brigade, Victoria, Australia. Mauger died in Elsternwick, Victoria and is buried in the Melbourne General Cemetery. At his funeral, he was given a fire guard honour. Mauger was survived by his wife, two sons and four daughters.

Victorian Legislative Assembly
Preceded by John Hancock	Member for Footscray; 1900–1901	Succeeded by Jacob Fotheringham
Political offices
Preceded by Austin Chapman	Postmaster-General; 1907–1908	Succeeded by Josiah Thomas
Australian House of Representatives
Preceded by New Seat	Member for Melbourne Ports; 1901–1906	Succeeded by James Mathews
Preceded by New Seat	Member for Maribyrnong; 1906–1910	Succeeded by James Fenton
