= Ian Baker (politician) =

Australian politician

Ian Malcolm John Baker (born 13 May 1944) is an Australian former politician and journalist.

Baker was born in Werribee. A journalist from 1963, he was education writer and chief industrial reporter with The Age (1969–71), staff writer with Nation Review (1971–73), chief of reporting staff with ABC News Victoria (1975–76) and producer for This Day Tonight (1977). In 1978 he received a Bachelor of Education from La Trobe University and returned to ABC News as editor, serving until 1982. He received a Master of Business Administration from Melbourne University in 1983 and was appointed as a consultant to the Treasurer and executive director of the Committee of Enquiry into Victorian Workers' Compensation. From 1985 to 1988 he was Director of Insurance Policy and Management in the Department of Management and Budget, and from 1984 to 1988 he was a member of the Labor Party's Economic Policy Committee.

In 1988, Baker was elected to the Victorian Legislative Assembly as the Labor member for Sunshine. He quickly moved to the front bench, becoming Minister for Property Services in 1990 and moving to Agriculture in 1991. Following Labor's defeat in 1992 he was Shadow Treasurer (1992–94). He then went to the backbench after he was unsuccessful in his attempt to wrest the ALP leadership from John Brumby, the sitting leader. Baker lost the spill by a vote of 31 votes to Brumby to 8 for him. Despite being defeated by a wide margin it was believed that Baker had the numbers to beat Brumby thanks to a deal made by the Socialist Left and Labor Unity factions to install him as leader, a deal that was torn up when Brumby agreed to concessions made to the factions.

He lost Labor preselection for Sunshine to Telmo Languiller in 1999 and ran as an independent, but he was defeated.

Victorian Legislative Assembly
Preceded by Bill Fogarty	Member for Sunshine; 1988–1999	Succeeded by Telmo Languiller
