= Electoral district of Ascot Vale =

Former state electoral district of Victoria, Australia

Ascot Vale Victoria—Legislative Assembly
- State: Victoria
- Dates current: 1955–1958, 1976–1985
- Namesake: suburb of Ascot Vale
- Demographic: Metropolitan

Ascot Vale was an electoral district of the Legislative Assembly in the Australian state of Victoria.

Ascot Vale was created in the 1955 electoral district redistribution; several districts, including Electoral district of Essendon, were abolished in 1955. The district of Essendon was re-created in 1958 and Ascot Vale abolished. Ascot Vale was then re-created in 1976 after several districts, including Electoral district of Moonee Ponds were abolished that year.

== Members ==
First incarnation (1955–1958)
Member	Party	Term
Ernie Shepherd	Labor	1955–1958

Second incarnation (1976–1985)
Member	Party	Term
Tom Edmunds	Labor	1976–1985
