= Bill Divers =

Australian politician

William Thomas George Divers (1 September 1896 – 29 June 1978) was an Australian politician. He was an Australian Labor Party member of the Victorian Legislative Assembly from 1958 to 1970.

He was born in Collingwood to brushmaker William Clinton Divers and Annie May Cozens. He attended the local state school and was a child actor until 1910. From 1910 to 1914 he was in the merchant navy; he served in the Royal Australian Navy from 1914 to 1918 during World War I and then returned to the merchant navy until 1920. He was a long-serving official in the Municipal Employees Union from the 1920s, initially as an organiser (1925–1937) and industrial officer (1937–1946). During the 1930s, he clashed with the Australian Workers' Union over their handling of pay disputes for municipal employees. He was also a City of Essendon councillor from 1932 to 1946 and mayor from 1936 to 1937. During World War II, he served with the Royal Australian Air Force, serving in New Guinea and attaining the rank of sergeant.

He rose to higher office in the Municipal Employees Union following the war, serving as state secretary (1946–1958), federal vice-president (1948–1953) and federal president (1953–1958). In 1954, in the leadup to the 1955 Labor split, he was a key supporter of federal intervention in the Victorian Labor Party to disband the existing state executive and confront the hard right-wing Industrial Groups, and was a public spokesperson for the unions that supported federal leader H. V. Evatt's stance on the issue. He was also a member of the Local Authorities Superannuation Board from 1947 to 1958 and a director of the Industrial Printing and Publicity Company from 1948 to 1977.

In 1958 he was elected to the Victorian Legislative Assembly for Footscray. He served until his retirement in 1970.

Divers died in Footscray in 1978.

In 1924 he married Ethelwynne Bowen, with whom he had two children; a later marriage on 5 November 1955 was to Lorna Jean Peters, née Forbes.

Victorian Legislative Assembly
Preceded by Ernie Shepherd	Member for Footscray; 1958–1970	Succeeded by Robert Fordham
