= Jack Holden (politician) =

Australian politician

Jack Bruce Holden (10 April 1921 – 6 February 2002) was an Australian politician.

He was born in Moonee Ponds to produce merchant John Henry Holden and Ada Wanstall. He attended University High School and became a clerk with the Customs Department in 1935. During World War II he served with the Royal Australian Air Force. On 5 November 1943 he married Lisbeth Gilbertson Hutton, with whom he had three children; this marriage was later dissolved. After the war he succeeded his father as proprietor of the family produce firm. In 1955 he was elected to the Victorian Legislative Assembly as the Liberal and Country Party member for Moonee Ponds. He served until his defeat in 1967. He was subsequently a partner in an architects' firm, and on 11 June 1976 married Shirley Heather Dawn, who predeceased him. Holden retired in 1974 and on 17 August 1992 married Ella Winifred Hillier. He died in 2002 at Mandurah in Western Australia.

Victorian Legislative Assembly
Preceded by Samuel Merrifield	Member for Moonee Ponds; 1955–1967	Succeeded by Tom Edmunds
