= Tom Edmunds =

Australian politician

Cyril Thomas Edmunds AM (24 October 1925 – 2 February 2003) was an Australian politician.

Edmunds was born in Essendon to plumber Cyril Edmunds and Gertrude Victoria Jeffreys. He attended local state schools and served in the Royal Australian Air Force from 1943 to 1945, as a coxswain in the South Pacific Air Sea Rescue Service. On his return he became a lithographer, managing a printing factory. On 14 June 1952 he married Vivienne Amy Ballantine; they had three children. In 1952 he joined the Labor Party, and held several local offices.

In 1967 Edmunds was elected to the Victorian Legislative Assembly as the member for Moonee Ponds; he would serve until 1988, transferring to Ascot Vale in 1976 and Pascoe Vale in 1988. He was Opposition spokesman on housing and planning from 1972 to 1977 and on police and emergency services from 1977 to 1982, as well as Opposition whip from 1976 to 1979 and from 1980 to 1982. When Labor won government in 1982 he was elected Speaker, serving until his retirement from politics in 1988. The following year he was appointed a Member of the Order of Australia.

Victorian Legislative Assembly
Preceded by Jim Plowman	Speaker; 1982–1988	Succeeded by Ken Coghill
Preceded by Jack Holden	Member for Moonee Ponds; 1967–1976	Abolished
New seat	Member for Ascot Vale; 1976–1985	Abolished
New seat	Member for Pascoe Vale; 1985–1988	Succeeded by Kelvin Thomson
