= Ernie Shepherd (politician) =

Australian politician

The Honourable Ernie Shepherd
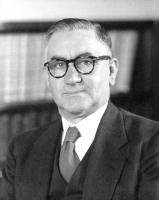

Leader of the Opposition of Victoria Elections: 1958
- In office 20 August 1957 – 12 September 1958
- Premier: Henry Bolte
- Deputy: Clive Stoneham
- Preceded by: John Cain Sr.
- Succeeded by: Clive Stoneham

Leader of the Labor Party in Victoria
- In office 9 August 1957 – 12 September 1958
- Deputy: Clive Stoneham
- Preceded by: John Cain Sr.
- Succeeded by: Clive Stoneham

Minister for Education
- In office 17 December 1952 – 7 June 1955
- Premier: John Cain Sr.
- Preceded by: Raymond Tovell
- Succeeded by: William Leggatt

Member of the Victorian Legislative Assembly for Footscray
- In office 31 May 1958 – 12 September 1958
- Preceded by: Roy Schintler
- Succeeded by: Bill Divers

Member of the Victorian Legislative Assembly for Ascot Vale
- In office 28 May 1955 – 18 April 1958
- Preceded by: Seat created
- Succeeded by: Seat abolished

Member of the Victorian Legislative Assembly for Sunshine
- In office 10 November 1945 – 22 April 1955
- Preceded by: Seat created
- Succeeded by: Seat abolished

Personal details
- Born: Alfred Ernest Shepherd; 6 January 1901 Bendigo, Victoria, Australia
- Died: 12 September 1958 (aged 57) West Footscray, Victoria, Australia
- Resting place: Fawkner Crematorium and Memorial Park
- Party: Labor Party
- Spouse: Beatrice Vera Hancock (m. 1926)
- Children: 2
- Occupation: Pattern-maker

Alfred Ernest Shepherd (6 January 1901 – 12 September 1958) was an Australian politician. He was an Australian Labor Party member of the Victorian Legislative Assembly for the electorates of Sunshine (1945–1955), Ascot Vale (1955–1958), and Footscray (1958). He was Minister for Education in the 1952-55 John Cain government and was leader of the Labor Party and Leader of the Opposition from 1957 until his death the following year.

== Early life and career ==
Shepherd was born in Bendigo, the son of Bendigo Trades Hall Council president Alfred Shepherd. He was educated at Violet Street State School, but left school at 14 to work for import firm Robert Harper & Co., continuing to study at night at the Bendigo School of Mines. He was a pattern-maker by trade, beginning as an apprentice at the Newport Railway Workshops at 17 and remaining there until his election to parliament in 1945, by which time he had risen to the role of sub-foreman. Shepherd was a City of Footscray councillor from 1943 to 1955 and mayor from 1948 to 1949. He was also founding director of the Footscray District Housing Co-operative Society in 1945 and a municipal representative on the Fairfield Infectious Diseases Hospital board from 1947 to 1956, serving as board chairman 1952-56.

Shepherd was also a keen sportsman, particularly in Australian rules football and swimming. He played football for the Footscray Football Club and North Melbourne Football Club seconds, was an umpire in the Victorian Football League second division, and was secretary of the Footscray Football Club in 1930 and the Footscray District Football League from 1933 to 1945. In swimming, he was secretary of the Footscray Swimming Club from 1918 to 1930, and a judge and registrar of the Victorian Amateur Swimming Association.

Shepherd was elected unopposed to the new seat of Sunshine at the 1945 election following his narrow victory in a hard-fought Labor preselection. When Labor won government under John Cain in 1952, he was promoted to Minister for Education, but the Cain government lost office in 1955 after only one term amidst the 1955 Labor split. His Sunshine electorate was abolished in a redistribution at the 1955 election, and he switched to the new seat of Ascot Vale.

Shepherd was promoted to deputy leader after Labor's 1955 defeat, at which his predecessor had lost his seat. When Cain died in 1957, Shepherd was elected unopposed as Labor leader and Leader of the Opposition. He shifted to the existing seat of Footscray in 1958 after the Ascot Vale seat was abolished in a redistribution.

== Death ==
Shepherd died in office in 1958. He had collapsed at the opening ceremony of a youth centre at West Footscray, and was rushed to nearby Footscray Hospital but was dead on arrival. He received a state funeral and was cremated.

== Legacy ==
Ern Shepherd Reserve in Maidstone, and the Shepherd Bridge, which carries Footscray Road over the Maribyrnong River, are both named for him.

Victorian Legislative Assembly
District created	Member for Sunshine; 1945–1955	District abolished
District created	Member for Ascot Vale; 1955–1958	District abolished
Preceded by Roy Schintler	Member for Footscray; 1958	Succeeded by Bill Divers
Political offices
Preceded by Raymond Tovell	Minister for Education; 1952–1955	Succeeded by William Leggatt
Preceded by John Cain, Sr.	Leader of the Opposition (Victoria); 1957–1958	Succeeded by Clive Stoneham
Party political offices
Preceded by John Cain, Sr.	Leader of the Labor Party in Victoria; 1957–1958	Succeeded by Clive Stoneham
