= Electoral district of Moonee Ponds =

Former state electoral district of Victoria, Australia

Coordinates: 37°46′S 144°55′E

Moonee Ponds Victoria—Legislative Assembly
- State: Victoria
- Created: 1945
- Abolished: 1976
- Namesake: Suburb of Moonee Ponds
- Demographic: Metropolitan

Electoral district of Moonee Ponds was an electoral district of the Legislative Assembly in the Australian state of Victoria.

Moonee Ponds was created in the redistribution of 1945, in which several districts were abolished including the Electoral district of Flemington. Moonee Ponds was abolished in the 1976 redistribution, Electoral district of Ascot Vale was created.

== Members for Moonee Ponds ==
Member	Party	Term
Samuel Merrifield	Labor	1945–1955
Jack Holden	Liberal	1955–1967
Tom Edmunds	Labor	1967–1976
