= Denis Lovegrove =

Australian politician (1904–1979)

The Honourable Denis Lovegrove
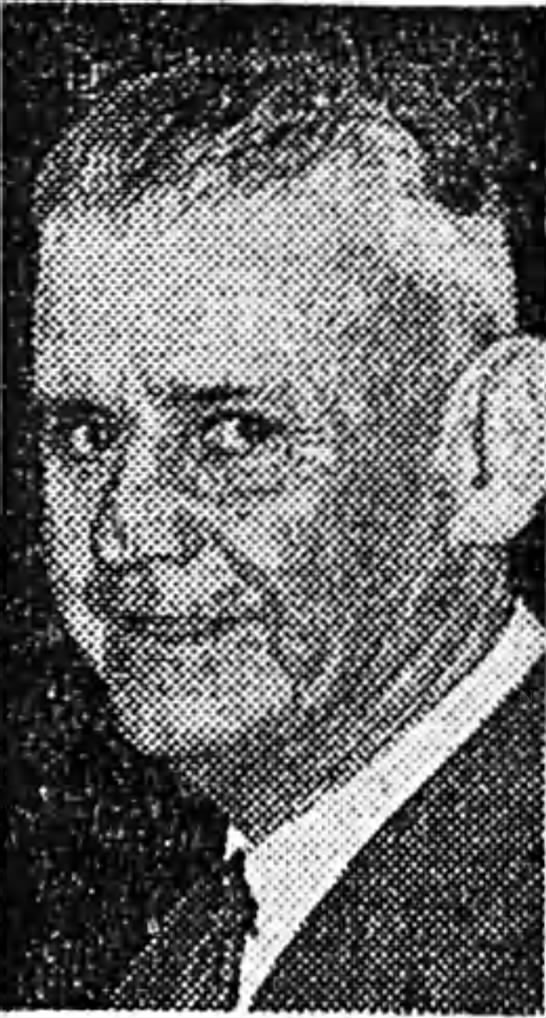

Deputy Leader of the Labor Party in Victoria
- In office 7 October 1958 – 15 May 1967
- Leader: Clive Stoneham
- Preceded by: Clive Stoneham
- Succeeded by: Frank Wilkes

Member of the Victorian Legislative Assembly for Sunshine
- In office 29 April 1967 – 17 April 1973
- Preceded by: Seat created
- Succeeded by: Bill Fogarty

Member of the Victorian Legislative Assembly for Fitzroy
- In office 31 May 1958 – 20 March 1967
- Preceded by: Seat created
- Succeeded by: Seat abolished

Member of the Victorian Legislative Assembly for Carlton
- In office 28 May 1955 – 18 April 1958
- Preceded by: Bill Barry
- Succeeded by: Seat abolished

Personal details
- Born: Denis Lovegrove; 25 September 1904 Carlton, Victoria, Australia
- Died: 25 January 1979 (aged 74) East Melbourne, Victoria, Australia
- Party: Labor Party
- Spouse(s): Irene Fratacis Chinn (m. 1927); Eileen Collins (m. 1950)
- Children: 2
- Profession: Union and party official

Denis ('Dinny') Lovegrove (25 September 1904 – 25 January 1979) was an Australian politician.

Born in Carlton (then a thoroughly working-class suburb of Melbourne), Lovegrove left school early, and held a variety of jobs including those of brass foundry worker, shipping office clerk and plasterer. In 1930 he joined the Communist Party of Australia, but he was expelled in 1933. Subsequently, when he publicly criticised the party, he was administered a severe thrashing in an attack carried out by communist thugs. He then joined the Labor Party and served on its state executive from 1938 to 1955 (holding the office of state president from 1943 to 1944). In addition, he was federal president of the ALP from 1953 to 1954. He was secretary of the Fibrous Plaster and Plaster Workers' Union (FPPWU) from 1935 to 1947 and its president 1955 to 1978, president of the Trades Hall Council in 1938, and a delegate to the Australian Council of Trade Unions. Until 1954, he was associated with the hardline anti-communist Industrial Groups; but in that year he decisively broke with them, and remained loyal to the ALP and its leader John Cain (Premier 1952–55) after the 'groupers' were forced out.

Lovegrove was elected to the Victorian Legislative Assembly in 1955 as the member for Carlton, transferring to Fitzroy three years later. From 1958 to 1967 he was Deputy Leader of the Opposition, which during those years was led by Clive Stoneham. He moved to the new seat of Sunshine in 1967, retired from the legislature in 1973, and died at East Melbourne in 1979.

Victorian Legislative Assembly
Preceded by Bill Barry	Member for Carlton; 1955–1958	Abolished
New seat	Member for Fitzroy; 1958–1967	Abolished
New seat	Member for Sunshine; 1967–1973	Succeeded by Bill Fogarty
