= Electoral district of Footscray =

State electoral district of Victoria, Australia

Footscray Victoria—Legislative Assembly
- Interactive map of electoral district boundaries from the 2022 state election
- State: Victoria
- Dates current: 1877–1904; 1927–present
- MP: Katie Hall
- Party: Labor Party
- Namesake: Footscray, Victoria
- Electors: 51,602 (2018)
- Area: 23 km^{2} (8.9 sq mi)
- Demographic: Inner metropolitan
- Coordinates: 37°48′S 144°52′E

The electoral district of Footscray is an electoral district of the Victorian Legislative Assembly. It lies just west of Melbourne, covering the suburbs of Footscray, Maidstone, Maribyrnong, Seddon, West Footscray, and parts of Yarraville.

The seat was first created by The Electoral Act Amendment Act 1876 taking effect at the 1877 elections. It was abolished in 1904 and recreated in 1927. In its current incarnation it has been held by the Labor Party for its entire existence. It has usually been a comfortably safe Labor seat, as it lies in Labor's traditional heartland of western and northern Melbourne.

== Members for Footscray ==
First incarnation (1877–1904)
Member	Party	Term
Mark Last King	Unaligned	1877–1879
William Clark	Unaligned	1879–1894
John Hancock	Labor	1894–1899
Samuel Mauger	Independent	1900–1901
Jacob Fotheringham	Liberal	1901–1902
Alexander McDonald	Liberal	1902–1904
Second incarnation (1927–present)
Member	Party	Term
George Prendergast	Labor	1927–1937
Jack Mullens	Labor	1937–1945
Jack Holland	Labor	1945–1955
Roy Schintler	Labor	1955–1958
Ernie Shepherd	Labor	1958
Bill Divers	Labor	1958–1970
Robert Fordham	Labor	1970–1992
Bruce Mildenhall	Labor	1992–2006
Marsha Thomson	Labor	2006–2018
Katie Hall	Labor	2018–present

== Election results ==
2022 Victorian state election: Footscray
Party	Candidate	Votes	%	±%
Labor	Katie Hall	17,387	43.1	−11.8
Greens	Elena Pereyra	9,045	22.4	+2.2
Liberal	Emete Joesika	7,214	17.9	+0.8
Victorian Socialists	Jorge Jorquera	3,769	9.3	+9.3
Democratic Labour	Alan Williams	1,098	2.7	+2.7
Animal Justice	Shohre Mansouri Jajaee	989	2.5	−3.5
Family First	Russell Muir	838	2.1	+2.1
Total formal votes		40,340	96.1	+1.5
Informal votes		1,654	3.9	−1.5
Turnout		41,994	86.0	+0.4
Notional two-party-preferred count
Labor	Katie Hall	30,523	75.7	−3.0
Liberal	Emete Joesika	9,817	24.3	+3.0
Two-candidate-preferred result
Labor	Katie Hall	21,880	54.2	−13.9
Greens	Elena Pereyra	18,460	45.8	+13.9
Labor hold		Swing	−13.9	

First preference vote history in Footscray since 1927 (Candidates under 5 per cent are excluded unless there are significance of candidacies at a given year) View source data.
Distribution of preference results in Footscray. View source data.
