= Electoral district of Yarraville =

Former state electoral district of Victoria

Coordinates: 37°49′S 144°53′E

Yarraville Victoria—Legislative Assembly
- State: Victoria
- Created: 1958
- Abolished: 1967
- Namesake: Suburb of Yarraville
- Demographic: Metropolitan

The electoral district of Yarraville was a district of the Legislative Assembly in the Australian state of Victoria.

== Members ==
Member	Party	Term
Roy Schintler	Labor	1958–1967
