= Roy Schintler =

Australian politician

George Roy Schintler OBE (14 June 1900 – 13 January 1977) was an Australian politician.

He was born in Adelong to miner George Edward Schintler and Matilda Julia Knight. He was educated at Corryong and Albury and served in the AIF during World War I. After the war he became a tram driver in Melbourne, and around 1921 he married Madelaine Pochon, with whom he had five children. He was an executive member of the Tramways Union and joined the Labor Party around 1929. From 1943 to 1956 he served on Footscray City Council; he was mayor from 1953 to 1954. On 7 September 1946 he married his second wife, Janet Emily Bryan. In 1955 he was elected to the Victorian Legislative Assembly as the member for Footscray, moving seats to Yarraville in 1958. He was a backbencher until his seat was abolished in 1967, whereupon he retired. Schintler died at Footscray in 1977.

Victorian Legislative Assembly
| Preceded by Jack Holland | Member for Footscray; 1955–1958 | Succeeded by Ernie Shepherd |
| New seat | Member for Yarraville; 1958–1967 | Abolished |
