= Electoral results for the Division of Wimmera =

Australian division election results

This is a list of electoral results for the Division of Wimmera in Australian federal elections from the division's creation in 1901 until its abolition in 1977.

== Members ==
Member	Party	Term
Pharez Phillips	Protectionist	1901–1906
Sydney Sampson	Ind. Protectionist	1906–1909
Sydney Sampson	Liberal	1909–1917
Sydney Sampson	Nationalist	1917–1919
Percy Stewart	Victorian Farmers/Country	1919–1926
Percy Stewart	Country Progressive	1926–1930
Percy Stewart	Independent Country	1930–1931
Hugh McClelland	Country	1931–1937
Alexander Wilson	Independent	1937–1945
Winton Turnbull	Country	1946–1949
William Lawrence	Liberal	1949–1958
Robert King	Country/National Country	1958–1977

== Election results ==
=== Elections in the 1970s ===
==== 1975 ====
1975 Australian federal election: Wimmera
Party	Candidate	Votes	%	±%
National Country	Robert King	28,275	58.8	+19.8
Labor	Brian Brooke	16,030	33.4	−3.5
Independent	Francis Petering	1,986	4.1	+4.1
Democratic Labor	Marjorie McOwan	1,762	3.7	−0.1
Total formal votes		48,053	98.7	
Informal votes		649	1.3	
Turnout		48,702	97.0	
Two-party-preferred result
National Country	Robert King		64.2	+2.6
Labor	Brian Brooke		35.8	−2.6
National Country hold		Swing	+2.6	

==== 1974 ====
1974 Australian federal election: Wimmera
Party	Candidate	Votes	%	±%
Country	Robert King	18,306	39.0	−8.0
Labor	Brian Brooke	17,338	36.9	−5.2
Liberal	Heather Mitchell	9,191	19.6	+19.6
Democratic Labor	Kevin Dunn	1,804	3.8	−3.3
Australia	Keith Sullivan	331	0.7	+0.7
Total formal votes		46,970	98.4	
Informal votes		758	1.6	
Turnout		47,728	96.9	
Two-party-preferred result
Country	Robert King	28,939	61.6	+6.0
Labor	Brian Brooke	18,031	38.4	−6.0
Country hold		Swing	+6.0	

==== 1972 ====
1972 Australian federal election: Wimmera
Party	Candidate	Votes	%	±%
Country	Robert King	20,512	47.0	+16.0
Labor	Brian Brooke	18,412	42.1	+4.6
Democratic Labor	Robert Hawks	3,113	7.1	+0.6
Independent	Ray Buckley	1,652	3.8	+3.8
Total formal votes		43,689	99.0	
Informal votes		422	1.0	
Turnout		44,111	97.2	
Two-party-preferred result
Country	Robert King	24,279	55.6	−2.4
Labor	Brian Brooke	19,410	44.4	+2.4
Country hold		Swing	−2.4	

=== Elections in the 1960s ===
==== 1969 ====
1969 Australian federal election: Wimmera
Party	Candidate	Votes	%	±%
Labor	Brian Brooke	16,534	37.5	+9.8
Country	Robert King	13,632	31.0	−4.6
Liberal	Miles Bourke	11,015	25.0	−2.9
Democratic Labor	Brian Cronin	2,851	6.5	−2.2
Total formal votes		44,032	98.4	
Informal votes		715	1.6	
Turnout		44,747	97.4	
Two-party-preferred result
Country	Robert King	25,531	58.0	+7.5
Labor	Brian Brooke	18,501	42.0	+42.0
Country hold		Swing	+7.5	

==== 1966 ====
1966 Australian federal election: Wimmera
Party	Candidate	Votes	%	±%
Country	Robert King	14,860	38.7	−4.3
Labor	George Jeffs	10,210	26.6	−1.7
Liberal	Wilson Bolton	10,139	26.4	+6.9
Democratic Labor	Bruno d'Elia	3,160	8.2	−1.1
Total formal votes		38,369	97.8	
Informal votes		858	2.2	
Turnout		39,227	97.2	
Two-party-preferred result
Country	Robert King	19,359	50.5	−18.7
Liberal	Wilson Bolton	19,010	49.5	+49.5
Country hold		Swing	−18.7	

==== 1963 ====
1963 Australian federal election: Wimmera
Party	Candidate	Votes	%	±%
Country	Robert King	16,772	43.0	+8.6
Labor	Thomas Windsor	11,023	28.3	−1.5
Liberal	Howard Rodda	7,599	19.5	−8.1
Democratic Labor	Adrian Cahill	3,610	9.3	+1.0
Total formal votes		39,004	99.2	
Informal votes		311	0.8	
Turnout		39,315	97.5	
Two-party-preferred result
Country	Robert King		69.2	+0.7
Labor	Thomas Windsor		30.8	−0.7
Country hold		Swing	+0.7	

==== 1961 ====
1961 Australian federal election: Wimmera
Party	Candidate	Votes	%	±%
Country	Robert King	13,364	34.4	+9.1
Labor	Thomas Windsor	11,567	29.8	+2.2
Liberal	William Lawrence	10,718	27.6	−10.6
Democratic Labor	Joseph Murphy	3,214	8.3	−0.6
Total formal votes		38,863	98.7	
Informal votes		515	1.3	
Turnout		39,378	96.9	
Two-party-preferred result
Country	Robert King	26,614	68.5	+12.6
Labor	Thomas Windsor	12,249	31.5	+31.5
Country hold		Swing	+12.6	

=== Elections in the 1950s ===
==== 1958 ====
1958 Australian federal election: Wimmera
Party	Candidate	Votes	%	±%
Liberal	William Lawrence	14,924	38.2	−20.4
Labor	Thomas Windsor	10,760	27.6	−2.5
Country	Robert King	9,866	25.3	+25.3
Democratic Labor	James McCaffrey	3,480	8.9	−2.4
Total formal votes		39,030	98.3	
Informal votes		658	1.7	
Turnout		39,688	96.9	
Two-party-preferred result
Country	Robert King	21,821	55.9	+55.9
Liberal	William Lawrence	17,209	44.1	−22.7
Country gain from Liberal		Swing	+22.7	

==== 1955 ====
1955 Australian federal election: Wimmera
Party	Candidate	Votes	%	±%
Liberal	William Lawrence	22,833	58.6	+15.1
Labor	Winston Lamb	11,745	30.1	−7.1
Labor (A-C)	Bernard Flanagan	4,413	11.3	+11.3
Total formal votes		38,991	98.3	
Informal votes		659	1.7	
Turnout		39,650	97.0	
Two-party-preferred result
Liberal	William Lawrence		66.8	+5.0
Labor	Winston Lamb		33.2	−5.0
Liberal hold		Swing	+5.0	

==== 1954 ====
1954 Australian federal election: Wimmera
Party	Candidate	Votes	%	±%
Liberal	William Lawrence	15,238	43.4	−19.6
Labor	Cyril Sudholz	11,671	33.3	−3.7
Country	Herbert Hilton	8,184	23.3	+23.3
Total formal votes		35,093	99.4	
Informal votes		201	0.6	
Turnout		35,294	96.7	
Two-party-preferred result
Liberal	William Lawrence	22,686	64.6	+1.6
Labor	Cyril Sudholz	12,407	35.4	−1.6
Liberal hold		Swing	+1.6	

==== 1951 ====
1951 Australian federal election: Wimmera
Party	Candidate	Votes	%	±%
Liberal	William Lawrence	22,005	63.0	+24.0
Labor	Cyril Sudholz	12,932	37.0	+5.3
Total formal votes		34,937	99.0	
Informal votes		358	1.0	
Turnout		35,295	96.9	
Liberal hold		Swing	−1.9	

=== Elections in the 1940s ===
==== 1949 ====
1949 Australian federal election: Wimmera
Party	Candidate	Votes	%	±%
Liberal	William Lawrence	13,761	39.0	+17.5
Labor	Cyril Sudholz	11,184	31.7	−6.8
Country	Harrie Wade	10,343	29.3	−10.7
Total formal votes		35,288	99.1	
Informal votes		308	0.9	
Turnout		35,596	97.0	
Two-party-preferred result
Liberal	William Lawrence	22,894	64.9	+64.9
Labor	Cyril Sudholz	12,394	35.1	−5.6
Liberal gain from Country		Swing	+5.6	

==== 1946 ====
1946 Australian federal election: Wimmera
Party	Candidate	Votes	%	±%
Country	Winton Turnbull	26,551	62.1	+3.1
Labor	Alfred Loveridge	16,216	37.9	+37.9
Total formal votes		42,767	98.6	
Informal votes		601	1.4	
Turnout		43,368	94.1	
Country hold		Swing	+3.1	

1946 Wimmera by-election
Party	Candidate	Votes	%	±%
Country	Winton Turnbull	15,284	43.1	+43.1
Country	Anthony Everett	6,724	19.0	+19.0
Independent Country	James Stoddart	6,361	17.9	+17.9
Independent Labor	John Smith	2,923	8.2	+8.2
Independent	Arnold Eberle	2,042	5.8	+5.8
Independent Labor	Frederick Arlington-Burke	1,824	5.1	+5.1
Independent	Louis Phillips	312	0.9	+0.9
Total formal votes		35,470	95.5	
Informal votes		1,692	4.5	
Turnout		37,162	82.9	
Two-party-preferred result
Country	Winton Turnbull	20,924	59.0	+59.0
Country	Anthony Everett	14,546	41.0	+41.0
Country gain from Independent		Swing	+59.0	

==== 1943 ====
1943 Australian federal election: Wimmera
Party	Candidate	Votes	%	±%
Independent	Alexander Wilson	26,479	62.3	+18.3
Independent Country	Reginald Skeat	10,976	25.8	+25.8
Independent Country	Albert Thompson	3,219	7.6	+7.6
Independent	Herbert Follett	1,449	3.4	+3.4
Independent Country	Eric Phillips	378	0.9	+0.9
Total formal votes		42,501	97.9	
Informal votes		930	2.1	
Turnout		43,431	96.6	
Two-party-preferred result
Independent	Alexander Wilson		67.2	+1.0
Independent Country	Reginald Skeat		32.8	+32.8
Independent hold		Swing	+1.0	

==== 1940 ====
1940 Australian federal election: Wimmera
Party	Candidate	Votes	%	±%
Independent	Alexander Wilson	19,915	44.0	−7.9
Country	Hugh McClelland	12,561	27.8	−20.3
Labor	Michael Nolan	11,222	24.8	+24.8
Independent	Robert Johnstone	1,523	3.4	+3.4
Total formal votes		45,221	98.6	
Informal votes		636	1.4	
Turnout		45,857	96.2	
Two-party-preferred result
Independent	Alexander Wilson	29,918	66.2	+14.3
Country	Hugh McClelland	15,303	33.8	−14.3
Independent hold		Swing	+14.3	

=== Elections in the 1930s ===
==== 1937 ====
1937 Australian federal election: Wimmera
Party	Candidate	Votes	%	±%
Independent	Alexander Wilson	24,179	51.9	+51.9
Country	Hugh McClelland	22,396	48.1	+14.8
Total formal votes		46,575	98.9	
Informal votes		541	1.1	
Turnout		47,116	96.1	
Independent gain from Country		Swing	+2.9	

==== 1934 ====
1934 Australian federal election: Wimmera
Party	Candidate	Votes	%	±%
Country	Hugh McClelland	16,509	33.3	−11.1
Independent Country	Les Simpson	16,488	33.2	+33.2
United Australia	William Morgan	8,788	17.7	−10.3
Single Tax League	Gordon Anderson	7,817	15.8	+15.8
Total formal votes		49,602	96.8	
Informal votes		1,662	3.2	
Turnout		51,264	94.2	
Two-party-preferred result
Country	Hugh McClelland	25,279	51.0	−10.8
Independent Country	Les Simpson	24,323	49.0	+49.0
Country hold		Swing	−10.8	

==== 1931 ====
1931 Australian federal election: Wimmera
Party	Candidate	Votes	%	±%
United Australia	William Morgan	12,763	28.0	+28.0
Independent	Alexander Dowsley	12,584	27.6	+27.6
Country	Hugh McClelland	12,071	26.5	+4.4
Country	Samuel Lockhart	5,233	11.5	+11.5
Country	William McCann	2,906	6.4	+6.4
Total formal votes		45,557	95.0	
Informal votes		2,377	5.0	
Turnout		47,934	95.8	
Two-party-preferred result
Country	Hugh McClelland	28,137	61.8	+21.8
Independent	Alexander Dowsley	17,420	38.2	+38.2
Country gain from Country Progressive		Swing	+21.8	

=== Elections in the 1920s ===
==== 1929 ====
1929 Australian federal election: Wimmera
Party	Candidate	Votes	%	±%
Country Progressive	Percy Stewart	27,942	60.0	+1.6
Country	John S. Harris	16,551	40.0	−1.6
Total formal votes		46,551	98.6	
Informal votes		650	1.4	
Turnout		47,201	94.9	
Country Progressive hold		Swing	+1.6	

==== 1928 ====
1928 Australian federal election: Wimmera
Party	Candidate	Votes	%	±%
Country Progressive	Percy Stewart	26,227	58.4	−30.6
Country	John S. Harris	18,716	41.6	+41.6
Total formal votes		44,943	97.6	
Informal votes		1,090	2.4	
Turnout		46,033	92.5	
Country Progressive gain from Independent Country		Swing	−30.6	

==== 1925 ====
1925 Australian federal election: Wimmera
Party	Candidate	Votes	%	±%
Independent Country	Percy Stewart	32,128	77.8	+77.8
Independent	Lucas de Garis	9,154	22.2	+22.2
Total formal votes		41,282	96.9	
Informal votes		1,312	3.1	
Turnout		42,594	87.7	
Independent Country gain from Country		Swing	+77.8	

==== 1922 ====
1922 Australian federal election: Wimmera
Party	Candidate	Votes	%	±%
Country	Percy Stewart	13,614	71.2	+11.7
United Country	Alfred Shaw	5,503	28.8	+28.8
Total formal votes		19,117	96.2	
Informal votes		765	3.8	
Turnout		19,882	46.9	
Country hold		Swing	+11.7	

=== Elections in the 1910s ===
==== 1919 ====
1919 Australian federal election: Wimmera
Party	Candidate	Votes	%	±%
Victorian Farmers	Percy Stewart	15,963	59.5	+59.5
Nationalist	Sydney Sampson	10,875	40.5	−59.5
Total formal votes		26,838	98.3	
Informal votes		476	1.7	
Turnout		27,314	73.0	
Victorian Farmers gain from Nationalist		Swing	+59.5	

==== 1917 ====
1917 Australian federal election: Wimmera
Party	Candidate	Votes	%	±%
Nationalist	Sydney Sampson	unopposed		
Nationalist hold		Swing		

==== 1914 ====
1914 Australian federal election: Wimmera
Party	Candidate	Votes	%	±%
Liberal	Sydney Sampson	unopposed		
Liberal hold		Swing		

==== 1913 ====
1913 Australian federal election: Wimmera
Party	Candidate	Votes	%	±%
Liberal	Sydney Sampson	18,030	71.0	+7.6
Labor	Thomas Carey	7,362	29.0	−6.6
Total formal votes		25,392	97.9	
Informal votes		548	2.1	
Turnout		25,940	73.7	
Liberal hold		Swing	+7.1	

==== 1910 ====
1910 Australian federal election: Wimmera
Party	Candidate	Votes	%	±%
Liberal	Sydney Sampson	11,488	66.0	−0.5
Labour	Richard Taffe	5,920	34.0	+10.8
Total formal votes		17,408	97.9	
Informal votes		366	2.1	
Turnout		17,774	57.3	
Liberal hold		Swing	+1.8	

=== Elections in the 1900s ===
==== 1906 ====
1906 Australian federal election: Wimmera
Party	Candidate	Votes	%	±%
Ind. Protectionist	Sydney Sampson	7,911	51.6	+14.6
Labour	Richard Taffe	3,554	23.2	+23.2
Ind. Anti-Socialist	Max Hirsch	2,002	13.0	+13.0
Ind. Protectionist	Herman Brauer	1,737	11.3	+11.3
Ind. Anti-Socialist	William Leslie	142	0.9	+0.9
Total formal votes		15,346	96.5	
Informal votes		560	3.5	
Turnout		15,906	57.0	
Ind. Protectionist gain from Protectionist		Swing	+14.6	

==== 1903 ====
1903 Australian federal election: Wimmera
Party	Candidate	Votes	%	±%
Protectionist	Pharez Phillips	3,263	39.0	−10.2
Free Trade	Max Hirsch	3,094	37.0	−1.0
Ind. Protectionist	John Gray	2,011	24.0	+24.0
Total formal votes		8,368	97.8	
Informal votes		185	2.2	
Turnout		8,553	51.2	
Protectionist hold		Swing	−4.6	

==== 1901 ====
1901 Australian federal election: Wimmera
Party	Candidate	Votes	%	±%
Protectionist	Pharez Phillips	2,372	49.2	+49.2
Free Trade	William Irvine	1,832	38.0	+38.0
Ind. Free Trade	Henry Williams	617	12.8	+12.8
Total formal votes		4,821	99.2	
Informal votes		39	0.8	
Turnout		4,860	49.1	
Protectionist win		(new seat)		
