= Electoral results for the district of Swan Hill =

Swan Hill elections

This is a list of electoral results for the Electoral district of Swan Hill in Victorian state elections.

== Members for Swan Hill ==
Member	Party	Term
John Gray	Ministerialist	1904–1917
John Gray	Independent	1904–1917
John Gray	Commonwealth Liberal	1904–1917
John Gray	Nationalist	1904–1917
Percy Stewart	Farmers Union	1917–1919
Francis Old	Farmers Union	1919–1945
Francis Old	Country	1919–1945
John Hipworth	Country	1945–1949
John Hipworth	Liberal	1949–1952
Harold Stirling	Country	1952–1968
Henry Broad	Country	1968–1973
Alan Wood	Liberal	1973–1983
Barry Steggall	National	1983–2002
Peter Walsh	National	2002–2014

== Election results ==
=== Elections in the 2010s ===
2010 Victorian state election: Swan Hill
Party	Candidate	Votes	%	±%
National	Peter Walsh	22,086	75.04	+27.61
Labor	Sharon Garrick	4,802	16.32	−2.19
Greens	Morgana Russell	1,326	4.51	+0.57
Family First	Garion Pearse	1,219	4.14	+0.81
Total formal votes		29,433	95.33	+0.00
Informal votes		1,441	4.67	+0.00
Turnout		30,874	93.35	−0.42
Two-party-preferred result
National	Peter Walsh	23,343	79.33	+5.93
Labor	Sharon Garrick	6,081	20.67	−5.93
National hold		Swing	+5.93	

=== Elections in the 2000s ===
2006 Victorian state election: Swan Hill
Party	Candidate	Votes	%	±%
National	Peter Walsh	14,302	47.4	+12.5
Liberal	Suellen Tomamichel	7,541	25.0	−1.6
Labor	Glenn Morrison	5,582	18.5	−7.9
Greens	Simon Roberts	1,189	3.9	−1.3
Family First	Martin Jones	1,004	3.3	+3.3
Citizens Electoral Council	Trudy Campbell	534	1.8	+1.8
Total formal votes		30,152	95.3	−1.5
Informal votes		1,476	4.7	+1.5
Turnout		31,628	93.8	
Two-party-preferred result
National	Peter Walsh	22,152	73.4	+9.2
Labor	Glenn Morrison	8,029	26.6	−9.2
National hold		Swing	+9.2	

2002 Victorian state election: Swan Hill
Party	Candidate	Votes	%	±%
National	Peter Walsh	11,066	34.9	−5.8
Liberal	Suellen Tomamichel	8,438	26.6	+18.7
Labor	Graeme Hill	8,384	26.4	+4.4
Independent	Rob Sonogan	2,217	7.0	+7.0
Greens	Jacquie Kelly	1,635	5.2	+5.2
Total formal votes		31,740	96.8	+0.2
Informal votes		1,038	3.2	−0.2
Turnout		32,778	94.6	
Two-party-preferred result
National	Peter Walsh	20,362	64.2	+2.2
Labor	Graeme Hill	11,378	35.8	−2.2
National hold		Swing	+2.2	

=== Elections in the 1990s ===
1999 Victorian state election: Swan Hill
Party	Candidate	Votes	%	±%
National	Barry Steggall	12,378	45.2	−13.8
Independent	Carl Ditterich	6,192	22.6	+22.6
Labor	Dallas Williams	5,511	20.1	+2.7
Independent	Bill Maher	1,435	5.2	+5.2
One Nation	Bill Croft	1,383	5.1	+5.1
Independent	Gerrit Schorel	257	0.9	+0.9
Independent	Leigh Bonney	219	0.8	+0.8
Total formal votes		27,375	96.3	−2.0
Informal votes		1,066	3.7	+2.0
Turnout		28,441	94.5	
Two-party-preferred result
National	Barry Steggall	16,864	61.4	−7.6
Labor	Dallas Williams	10,619	38.6	+7.6
Two-candidate-preferred result
National	Barry Steggall	14,450	52.8	−16.2
Independent	Carl Ditterich	12,925	47.2	+47.2
National hold		Swing	−16.2	

1996 Victorian state election: Swan Hill
Party	Candidate	Votes	%	±%
National	Barry Steggall	17,007	59.0	−16.4
Independent	Tom Bowles	6,270	21.8	+21.8
Labor	Vera Alcock	5,027	17.4	+0.6
Natural Law	Chris Hadzilias	505	1.8	+1.8
Total formal votes		28,809	98.3	+0.7
Informal votes		509	1.7	−0.7
Turnout		29,318	95.2	
Two-party-preferred result
National	Barry Steggall	19,782	69.0	−10.4
Labor	Vera Alcock	8,908	31.0	+10.4
National hold		Swing	−10.4	

1992 Victorian state election: Swan Hill
Party	Candidate	Votes	%	±%
National	Barry Steggall	22,361	75.4	+16.3
Labor	Vera Alcock	4,981	16.8	−3.4
Independent	Geoff Burnside	2,306	7.8	+7.8
Total formal votes		29,648	97.6	−0.6
Informal votes		731	2.4	+0.6
Turnout		30,379	96.3	
Two-party-preferred result
National	Barry Steggall	23,551	79.4	+1.9
Labor	Vera Alcock	6,092	20.6	−1.9
National hold		Swing	+1.9	

=== Elections in the 1980s ===
1988 Victorian state election: Swan Hill
Party	Candidate	Votes	%	±%
National	Barry Steggall	15,539	60.74	+2.38
Labor	Ronald Stanton	5,132	20.06	−0.64
Liberal	Daphne Wilkins	4,912	19.20	−1.74
Total formal votes		25,583	98.20	−0.29
Informal votes		468	1.80	+0.29
Turnout		26,051	92.99	−1.25
Two-party-preferred result
National	Barry Steggall	19,940	77.96	+2.17
Labor	Ronald Stanton	5,638	22.04	+22.04
National hold		Swing	+2.17	

1985 Victorian state election: Swan Hill
Party	Candidate	Votes	%	±%
National	Barry Steggall	15,192	58.4	+38.6
Liberal	Ian Ray	5,450	20.9	−35.7
Labor	Ronald Stanton	5,388	20.7	+0.5
Total formal votes		26,030	98.5	
Informal votes		398	1.5	
Turnout		26,428	94.2	
Two-party-preferred result
National	Barry Steggall	20,199	77.6	+3.7
Labor	Ronald Stanton	5,831	22.4	−3.7
National gain from Liberal		Swing	N/A	

- The two candidate preferred vote was not counted between the Liberal and National candidates for Swan Hill.

1983 Swan Hill state by-election
Party	Candidate	Votes	%	±%
National	Barry Steggall	10,444	44.2	+25.5
Liberal	William Richards	7,517	31.8	−26.9
Labor	Ronald Stanton	5,648	23.9	+4.7
Total formal votes		23,609	99.1	+0.8
Informal votes		203	0.9	−0.8
Turnout		23,812	88.3	−6.3
Two-candidate-preferred result
National	Barry Steggall	14,736	62.4	+62.4
Liberal	William Richards	8,873	37.6	−39.4
National gain from Liberal		Swing	N/A	

1982 Victorian state election: Swan Hill
Party	Candidate	Votes	%	±%
Liberal	Alan Wood	14,493	58.7	−0.3
Labor	Ian Hardie	4,748	19.2	+1.5
National	David Shannon	4,611	18.7	−4.7
Democrats	John Greig	858	3.5	+3.5
Total formal votes		24,710	98.3	−0.1
Informal votes		414	1.7	+0.1
Turnout		25,124	94.6	−0.9
Two-party-preferred result
Liberal	Alan Wood	19,024	77.0	+2.2
Labor	Ian Hardie	5,686	23.0	−2.2
Liberal hold		Swing	+2.2	

=== Elections in the 1970s ===
1979 Victorian state election: Swan Hill
Party	Candidate	Votes	%	±%
Liberal	Alan Wood	14,371	59.0	+10.7
National	Keith Warne	5,698	23.4	−11.9
Labor	Geoffrey Ferns	4,300	17.7	+3.4
Total formal votes		24,369	98.4	−0.2
Informal votes		394	1.6	+0.2
Turnout		24,763	95.5	+0.8
Two-party-preferred result
Liberal	Alan Wood	18,223	74.8	−8.4
Labor	Geoffrey Ferns	6,146	25.2	+8.4
Liberal hold		Swing	−8.4	

- The two candidate preferred vote was not counted between the Liberal and National candidates for Swan Hill.

1976 Victorian state election: Swan Hill
Party	Candidate	Votes	%	±%
Liberal	Alan Wood	11,318	48.3	+17.3
National	James Mitchell	8,258	35.3	−3.5
Labor	Graeme Lechte	3,352	14.3	−8.8
Democratic Labor	Daniel Mason	494	2.1	−5.0
Total formal votes		23,422	98.6	
Informal votes		331	1.4	
Turnout		23,753	94.7	
Two-candidate-preferred result
Liberal	Alan Wood	14,097	60.2	+9.2
National	James Mitchell	9,325	39.8	−9.2
Liberal hold		Swing	+9.2	

1973 Victorian state election: Swan Hill
Party	Candidate	Votes	%	±%
Country	Henry Broad	7,148	38.9	−1.0
Liberal	Alan Wood	5,965	32.5	+12.1
Labor	Patricia Fraser	3,958	21.5	−4.9
Democratic Labor	Rodger Donohue	1,305	7.1	−6.2
Total formal votes		18,376	97.6	+0.4
Informal votes		453	2.4	−0.4
Turnout		18,829	95.1	−0.7
Two-candidate-preferred result
Liberal	Alan Wood	9,421	51.3	+51.3
Country	Henry Broad	8,955	48.7	−21.6
Liberal gain from Country		Swing	N/A	

1970 Victorian state election: Swan Hill
Party	Candidate	Votes	%	±%
Country	Henry Broad	6,960	39.9	−17.3
Labor	Jack McLean	4,605	26.4	+11.7
Liberal	Laurence Troy	3,564	20.4	+8.9
Democratic Labor	Rodger Donohue	2,312	13.3	−3.3
Total formal votes		17,441	97.2	−0.4
Informal votes		495	2.8	+0.4
Turnout		17,936	95.8	+0.2
Two-party-preferred result
Country	Henry Broad	12,268	70.3	−11.4
Labor	Jack McLean	5,173	29.7	+11.4
Two-candidate-preferred result
Country	Henry Broad	11,437	65.6	−16.1
Liberal	Laurence Troy	6,004	34.4	+34.4
Country hold		Swing	−16.1	

=== Elections in the 1960s ===
1968 Swan Hill state by-election
Party	Candidate	Votes	%	±%
Country	Henry Broad	8,080	47.9	−9.3
Liberal	Gordon Harrison	4,424	26.3	+14.8
Labor	John McLean	4,350	25.8	+11.1
Total formal votes		16,854	98.6	+1.0
Informal votes		244	1.4	−1.0
Turnout		17,098	91.9	−3.7
Two-candidate-preferred result
Country	Henry Broad	9,492	56.3	
Liberal	Gordon Harrison	7,362	43.7	
Country hold		Swing	N/A	

1967 Victorian state election: Swan Hill
Party	Candidate	Votes	%	±%
Country	Harold Stirling	9,842	57.2	−0.8
Democratic Labor	John Carty	2,865	16.6	+5.5
Labor	Robert Dorning	2,522	14.7	−8.6
Liberal	Bernard Treseder	1,985	11.5	+3.9
Total formal votes		17,214	97.6	
Informal votes		417	2.4	
Turnout		17,631	95.6	
Two-party-preferred result
Country	Harold Stirling	14,064	81.7	+7.0
Labor	Robert Dorning	3,150	18.3	−7.0
Country hold		Swing	+7.0	

1964 Victorian state election: Swan Hill
Party	Candidate	Votes	%	±%
Country	Harold Stirling	7,182	38.7	+11.3
Country	Thomas Mellor	4,405	23.8	+23.8
Labor	Jack McLean	3,396	18.3	+5.2
Democratic Labor	John McMahon	2,118	11.4	−1.7
Liberal and Country	Bernard Treseder	1,438	7.8	−11.2
Total formal votes		18,539	96.4	−0.6
Informal votes		686	3.6	+0.6
Turnout		19,225	95.6	−0.8
Two-party-preferred result
Country	Harold Stirling	14,589	78.7	−6.7
Labor	Jack McLean	3,950	21.3	+6.7
Country hold		Swing	−6.7	

1961 Victorian state election: Swan Hill
Party	Candidate	Votes	%	±%
Country	Herbert Hilton	5,041	27.4	+27.4
Country	Harold Stirling	4,514	24.5	−42.9
Liberal and Country	Gordon Harrison	3,494	19.0	+19.0
Democratic Labor	John McMahon	2,415	13.1	+13.1
Labor	Clarence Wohlers	1,812	9.8	+9.8
Independent	John Hipworth	1,150	6.2	−26.4
Total formal votes		18,426	97.0	−0.9
Informal votes		566	3.0	+0.9
Turnout		18,992	96.4	+1.1
Two-party-preferred result
Country	Harold Stirling	15,740	85.4	−1.0
Labor	Clarence Wohlers	2,686	14.6	+1.0
Two-candidate-preferred result
Country	Harold Stirling	11,087	60.2	−7.2
Country	Herbert Hilton	7,339	39.8	+39.8
Country hold		Swing	N/A	

=== Elections in the 1950s ===
1958 Victorian state election: Swan Hill
Party	Candidate	Votes	%	±%
Country	Harold Stirling	12,402	67.4	
Independent	John Hipworth	6,006	32.6	
Total formal votes		18,408	97.9	
Informal votes		399	2.1	
Turnout		18,807	95.3	
Country hold		Swing		

1955 Victorian state election: Swan Hill
Party	Candidate	Votes	%	±%
Country	Harold Stirling	8,105	46.4	
Independent	Duncan Douglas	5,824	33.4	
Independent	John Hipworth	3,528	20.2	
Total formal votes		17,457	98.0	
Informal votes		348	2.0	
Turnout		17,805	94.5	
Two-candidate-preferred result
Country	Harold Stirling	9,472	54.2	
Independent	Duncan Douglas	7,985	45.8	
Country hold		Swing		

1952 Victorian state election: Swan Hill
Party	Candidate	Votes	%	±%
Country	Harold Stirling	5,171	39.1	−9.2
Electoral Reform	John Hipworth	4,082	30.9	+30.9
Independent	Duncan Douglas	3,970	30.0	+30.0
Total formal votes		13,223	97.9	−1.2
Informal votes		278	2.1	+1.2
Turnout		13,501	94.3	−0.1
Two-candidate-preferred result
Country	Harold Stirling	9,124	57.4	+9.1
Electoral Reform	John Hipworth	5,504	41.6	+41.6
Country gain from Liberal and Country		Swing	N/A	

1950 Victorian state election: Swan Hill
Party	Candidate	Votes	%	±%
Liberal and Country	John Hipworth	6,792	51.7	+51.7
Country	Samuel Lockhart	6,339	48.3	−16.6
Total formal votes		13,131	99.1	−0.2
Informal votes		124	0.9	+0.2
Turnout		13,255	94.4	0.0
Liberal and Country gain from Country		Swing	N/A	

=== Elections in the 1940s ===
1947 Victorian state election: Swan Hill
Party	Candidate	Votes	%	±%
Country	John Hipworth	8,324	64.9	+25.4
Labor	Philip Meehan	3,360	26.2	−4.3
Independent Country	Stanley Taylor	1,145	8.9	+8.9
Total formal votes		12,829	99.3	+1.1
Informal votes		90	0.7	−1.1
Turnout		12,919	94.4	+7.6
Country hold		Swing	N/A	

- Preferences were not distributed.

1945 Victorian state election: Swan Hill
Party	Candidate	Votes	%	±%
Independent Country	John Hipworth	4,515	39.5	
Labor	William Kent	3,493	30.5	
Country	Francis Old	3,429	30.0	
Total formal votes		11,437	98.2	
Informal votes		208	1.8	
Turnout		11,645	86.8	
Two-party-preferred result
Independent Country	John Hipworth	6,962	60.9	
Labor	William Kent	4,475	39.1	
Independent Country gain from Country		Swing		

1943 Victorian state election: Swan Hill
Party	Candidate	Votes	%	±%
Country	Francis Old	4,590	62.7	+3.5
Labor	William Kent	2,727	37.3	+37.3
Total formal votes		7,317	97.0	−1.4
Informal votes		223	3.0	+1.4
Turnout		7,540	84.6	−9.4
Country hold		Swing	N/A	

1940 Victorian state election: Swan Hill
Party	Candidate	Votes	%	±%
Country	Francis Old	5,030	59.2	−5.0
Country	Percy Byrnes	1,776	20.9	−5.1
Country	Launcelot Nind	1,686	19.8	+19.8
Total formal votes		8,492	98.4	−0.2
Informal votes		138	1.6	+0.2
Turnout		8,630	94.0	+0.9
Country hold		Swing	N/A	

- Preferences were not distributed.

=== Elections in the 1930s ===
1937 Victorian state election: Swan Hill
Party	Candidate	Votes	%	±%
Country	Francis Old	5,540	64.2	+21.6
Country	Percy Byrnes	2,246	26.0	+26.0
United Australia	Alfred Jager	842	9.8	+9.8
Total formal votes		8,628	98.6	+0.4
Informal votes		126	1.4	−0.4
Turnout		8,754	93.1	+1.1
Country hold		Swing	N/A	

- Preferences were not distributed.

1935 Victorian state election: Swan Hill
Party	Candidate	Votes	%	±%
Country	Francis Old	3,765	42.6	−12.5
Independent	Cyril Judd	2,631	29.8	+29.8
Independent	Robert Roberts	1,237	14.0	+14.0
Independent	William Sullivan	1,196	13.6	+13.6
Total formal votes		8,829	98.2	−0.6
Informal votes		164	1.8	+0.6
Turnout		8,993	92.0	−1.1
Two-candidate-preferred result
Country	Francis Old	4,496	50.9	−8.7
Independent	Cyril Judd	4,333	49.1	+49.1
Country hold		Swing	N/A	

1932 Victorian state election: Swan Hill
Party	Candidate	Votes	%	±%
Country	Francis Old	3,381	40.0	−16.7
Independent Country	Ernest Gray	1,958	23.2	+23.2
Independent	Phillip Purves	1,826	21.6	+21.6
Country	Walton McManus	1,278	15.1	+15.1
Total formal votes		8,443	98.8	−0.4
Informal votes		100	1.2	+0.4
Turnout		8,543	93.1	+2.3
Two-candidate-preferred result
Country	Francis Old	5,030	59.6	+2.9
Independent Country	Ernest Gray	3,413	40.4	+40.4
Country hold		Swing	N/A	

=== Elections in the 1920s ===
1929 Victorian state election: Swan Hill
Party	Candidate	Votes	%	±%
Country	Francis Old	4,706	56.7	+13.2
Country Progressive	Thomas Connellan	3,590	43.3	+16.2
Total formal votes		8,296	99.2	+2.3
Informal votes		71	0.8	−2.3
Turnout		8,367	90.8	+3.7
Country hold		Swing	N/A	

1927 Victorian state election: Swan Hill
Party	Candidate	Votes	%	±%
Country	Francis Old	3,245	43.5	
Independent	William Sullivan	2,190	29.4	
Country Progressive	Ernest Gray	2,021	27.1	
Total formal votes		7,456	96.9	
Informal votes		240	3.1	
Turnout		7,696	87.1	
Two-candidate-preferred result
Country	Francis Old	4,510	60.5	
Independent	William Sullivan	2,946	39.5	
Country hold		Swing		

1924 Victorian state election: Swan Hill
Party	Candidate	Votes	%	±%
Country	Francis Old	5,347	52.4	−20.7
Labor	Edward Nicholls	3,187	31.2	+31.2
Nationalist	Ernest Gray	1,663	16.3	−10.6
Total formal votes		10,197	98.0	−0.9
Informal votes		211	2.0	+0.9
Turnout		10,408	48.5	0.0
Two-party-preferred result
Country	Francis Old		66.2	−6.9
Labor	Edward Nicholls		33.8	+33.8
Country hold		Swing	N/A	

- Two party preferred vote was estimated.

1921 Victorian state election: Swan Hill
Party	Candidate	Votes	%	±%
Victorian Farmers	Francis Old	6,360	73.1	−2.9
Nationalist	Royden Patterson	2,340	26.9	+2.9
Total formal votes		8,700	98.9	+5.1
Informal votes		94	1.1	−5.1
Turnout		8,794	48.5	−2.4
Victorian Farmers hold		Swing	−2.9	

1920 Victorian state election: Swan Hill
Party	Candidate	Votes	%	±%
Victorian Farmers	Francis Old	6,386	76.0	+25.1
Nationalist	Frank Hughes	2,015	24.0	+0.7
Total formal votes		8,401	93.8	−2.5
Informal votes		559	6.2	+2.5
Turnout		8,960	50.9	−5.8
Victorian Farmers hold		Swing	N/A	

=== Elections in the 1910s ===
1919 Swan Hill state by-election
Party	Candidate	Votes	%	±%
Victorian Farmers	Francis Old	unopposed		
Victorian Farmers hold		Swing		

1917 Victorian state election: Swan Hill
Party	Candidate	Votes	%	±%
Victorian Farmers	Percy Stewart	3,877	50.9	
Independent	Hugh McClelland	1,972	25.9	
Nationalist	John Gray	1,774	23.3	
Total formal votes		7,623	96.3	−0.6
Informal votes		290	3.7	+0.6
Turnout		7,913	56.7	+11.2
Victorian Farmers gain from Nationalist		Swing	N/A	

- Two candidate preferred vote was not counted.

1914 Victorian state election: Swan Hill
Party	Candidate	Votes	%	±%
Liberal	John Gray	3,459	58.5	−41.5
Liberal	Hugh McClelland	2,449	41.5	+41.5
Total formal votes		5,908	96.9	
Informal votes		190	3.1	
Turnout		6,098	45.5	
Liberal hold		Swing	N/A	

1911 Victorian state election: Swan Hill
Party	Candidate	Votes	%	±%
Liberal	John Gray	unopposed		
Liberal hold		Swing		
