= Members of the Victorian Legislative Assembly, 1967–1970 =

- ←1964–1967 1970–1973→

This is a list of members of the Victorian Legislative Assembly from 1967 to 1970, as elected at the 1967 state election:

Name	Party	Electorate	Term in office
Hon Jim Balfour	Liberal	Narracan	1955–1982
Norman Billing	Liberal	Heatherton	1967–1979
Hayden Birrell	Liberal	Geelong	1961–1982
Hon Sir John Bloomfield	Liberal	Malvern	1953–1970
Hon Sir Henry Bolte	Liberal	Hampden	1947–1972
Bill Borthwick	Liberal	Monbulk	1960–1982
Henry Broad ^{[1]}	Country	Swan Hill	1968–1973
Ray Buckley	Country	Lowan	1967–1970
Hon Sir Vernon Christie	Liberal	Ivanhoe	1955–1973
Arthur Clarey	Labor	Melbourne	1955–1972
Leslie Cochrane	Country	Gippsland West	1950–1970
Tom Darcy	Liberal	Polwarth	1958–1970
Bill Divers	Labor	Footscray	1958–1970
Brian Dixon	Liberal	St Kilda	1964–1982
Julian Doyle	Liberal	Gisborne	1967–1971
Roberts Dunstan	Liberal	Dromana	1956–1982
Tom Edmunds	Labor	Moonee Ponds	1967–1988
Bruce Evans	Country	Gippsland East	1961–1992
Tom Evans	Liberal	Ballarat North	1960–1988
Leo Fennessy	Labor	Brunswick East	1955–1970
Larry Floyd	Labor	Williamstown	1955–1973
Jack Ginifer	Labor	Deer Park	1966–1982
Dorothy Goble	Liberal	Mitcham	1967–1976
Geoff Hayes	Liberal	Scoresby	1967–1982
Clyde Holding	Labor	Richmond	1962–1977
Hon Sir Herbert Hyland	Country	Gippsland South	1929–1970
Harry Jenkins Sr. ^{[2]}	Labor	Reservoir	1961–1969
Walter Jona	Liberal	Hawthorn	1964–1985
Alan Lind ^{[3]}	Labor	Dandenong	1952–1955, 1969–1979
Denis Lovegrove	Labor	Sunshine	1955–1973
Sam Loxton	Liberal	Prahran	1955–1979
Jim MacDonald	Liberal	Glen Iris	1955–1976
Hon Jim Manson	Liberal	Ringwood	1955–1973
Russell McDonald	Country	Rodney	1964–1973
Hon Sir William McDonald	Liberal	Dundas	1947–1952, 1955–1970
Don McKellar	Liberal	Portland	1967–1970, 1973–1985
Ian McLaren	Liberal	Bennettswood	1945–1947, 1965–1979
Edward Meagher	Liberal	Frankston	1955–1976
Tom Mitchell	Country	Benambra	1947–1976
Hon George Moss	Country	Murray Valley	1945–1973
Jack Mutton	Independent	Coburg	1967–1979
Bill Phelan	Country	Kara Kara	1964–1970
Hon Murray Porter	Liberal	Sandringham	1955–1970
Joe Rafferty	Liberal	Glenhuntly	1955–1979
Llew Reese	Liberal	Moorabbin	1967–1979
Hon George Reid	Liberal	Box Hill	1947–1952, 1955–1973
Len Reid ^{[3]}	Liberal	Dandenong	1958–1969
Charlie Ring	Labor	Preston	1955–1970
Peter Ross-Edwards	Country	Shepparton	1967–1991
Hon John Rossiter	Liberal	Brighton	1955–1976
Hon Sir Arthur Rylah	Liberal	Kew	1949–1971
Alan Scanlan	Liberal	Oakleigh	1961–1979
Jim Simmonds ^{[2]}	Labor	Reservoir	1969–1992
Aurel Smith	Liberal	Bellarine	1967–1982
Ian Smith	Liberal	Warrnambool	1967–1983, 1985–1999
Bill Stephen	Liberal	Ballarat South	1964–1979
Harold Stirling ^{[1]}	Country	Swan Hill	1952–1968
Russell Stokes	Liberal	Evelyn	1958–1973
Hon Clive Stoneham	Labor	Midlands	1942–1970
Bob Suggett	Liberal	Bentleigh	1955–1979
Hon Keith Sutton	Labor	Albert Park	1950–1970
Archie Tanner	Liberal	Morwell	1967–1970
Sir Edgar Tanner	Liberal	Caulfield	1955–1976
Alex Taylor	Liberal	Balwyn	1955–1973
Bill Templeton	Liberal	Mentone	1967–1985
Robert Trethewey	Liberal	Bendigo	1964–1973
Neil Trezise	Labor	Geelong North	1964–1992
Tom Trewin	Country	Benalla	1961–1982
Campbell Turnbull	Labor	Brunswick West	1955–1973
Monte Vale	Liberal	Greensborough	1967–1970, 1973, 1973–1977
Kenneth Wheeler	Liberal	Essendon	1958–1979
Milton Whiting	Country	Mildura	1962–1988
Hon Vernon Wilcox	Liberal	Camberwell	1956–1976
Frank Wilkes	Labor	Northcote	1957–1988
John Wilton	Labor	Broadmeadows	1962–1985
Ray Wiltshire	Liberal	Syndal	1955–1976

^{1} On 23 July 1968, the Country member for Swan Hill, Harold Stirling, died. Country candidate Henry Broad won the resulting by-election on 14 September 1968.
^{2} In September 1969, the Labor member for Reservoir, Harry Jenkins, Sr., resigned to contest the seat of Scullin at the 1969 federal election. Labor candidate Jim Simmonds was elected unopposed at the close of nominations at the resulting by-election on 27 October 1969.
^{3} In September 1969, the Liberal member for Dandenong, Len Reid, resigned to contest the seat of Holt at the 1969 federal election. Labor candidate Alan Lind won the resulting by-election on 6 December 1969.
