= Members of the Victorian Legislative Assembly, 1964–1967 =

- ←1961–1964 1967–1970→

This is a list of members of the Victorian Legislative Assembly from 1964 to 1967, as elected at the 1964 state election:

Name	Party	Electorate	Term in office
Hon Jim Balfour	Liberal	Morwell	1955–1982
Hayden Birrell	Liberal	Geelong	1961–1982
Hon John Bloomfield	Liberal	Malvern	1953–1970
Hon Henry Bolte	Liberal	Hampden	1947–1972
Bill Borthwick	Liberal	Scoresby	1960–1982
Vernon Christie	Liberal	Ivanhoe	1955–1973
Arthur Clarey	Labor	Melbourne	1955–1972
Leslie Cochrane	Country	Gippsland West	1950–1970
Roy Crick^{[2]}	Labor	Grant	1955–1966
Hon Tom Darcy	Liberal	Polwarth	1958–1970
Bill Divers	Labor	Footscray	1958–1970
Brian Dixon	Liberal	St Kilda	1964–1982
Roberts Dunstan	Liberal	Mornington	1956–1982
Bruce Evans	Country	Gippsland East	1961–1992
Tom Evans	Liberal	Ballarat North	1960–1988
Leo Fennessy	Labor	Brunswick East	1955–1970
Larry Floyd	Labor	Williamstown	1955–1973
Hon Alexander Fraser^{[1]}	Liberal	Caulfield	1950–1952; 1955–1965
Richard Gainey	Liberal	Elsternwick	1955–1967
George Gibbs	Liberal/Independent	Portland	1955–1967
Jack Ginifer^{[2]}	Labor	Grant	1966–1982
Jack Holden	Liberal	Moonee Ponds	1955–1967
Clyde Holding	Labor	Richmond	1962–1977
Kevin Holland	Labor	Flemington	1956–1967
Philip Hudson	Liberal	Toorak	1964–1967
Hon Sir Herbert Hyland	Country	Gippsland South	1929–1970
Harry Jenkins, Sr.	Labor	Reservoir	1961–1969
Walter Jona	Liberal	Hawthorn	1964–1985
Denis Lovegrove	Labor	Fitzroy	1955–1973
Sam Loxton	Liberal	Prahran	1955–1979
Jim McCabe	Country	Lowan	1964–1967, 1970–1979
Jim MacDonald	Liberal	Burwood	1955–1976
Russell McDonald	Country	Rodney	1964–1973
Hon Sir William McDonald	Liberal	Dundas	1947–1952; 1955–1970
Ian McLaren^{[1]}	Liberal	Caulfield	1945–1947, 1965–1979
Hon Jim Manson	Liberal	Ringwood	1955–1973
Hon Edward Meagher	Liberal	Mentone	1955–1976
Hon Tom Mitchell	Country	Benambra	1947–1976
Hon George Moss	Country	Murray Valley	1945–1973
Charlie Mutton	Labor	Coburg	1940–1967
Bill Phelan	Country	Kara Kara	1964–1970
Murray Porter	Liberal	Sandringham	1955–1970
Joe Rafferty	Liberal	Ormond	1955–1979
Hon George Reid	Liberal	Box Hill	1947–1952; 1955–1973
Len Reid	Liberal	Dandenong	1958–1969
Charlie Ring	Labor	Preston	1955–1970
Hon John Rossiter	Liberal	Brighton	1955–1976
Hon Arthur Rylah	Liberal	Kew	1949–1971
Alan Scanlan	Liberal	Oakleigh	1961–1979
Roy Schintler	Labor	Yarraville	1955–1967
Bill Stephen	Liberal	Ballarat South	1964–1979
Harold Stirling	Country	Swan Hill	1952–1968
Russell Stokes	Liberal	Evelyn	1958–1973
Clive Stoneham	Labor	Midlands	1942–1970
Bob Suggett	Liberal	Moorabbin	1955–1979
Keith Sutton	Labor	Albert Park	1950–1970
Edgar Tanner	Liberal	Ripponlea	1955–1976
Alex Taylor	Liberal	Balwyn	1955–1973
Robert Trethewey	Liberal	Bendigo	1964–1973
Tom Trewin	Country	Benalla	1961–1982
Neil Trezise	Labor	Geelong West	1964–1992
Campbell Turnbull	Labor	Brunswick West	1955–1973
Kenneth Wheeler	Liberal	Essendon	1958–1979
Milton Whiting	Country	Mildura	1962–1988
Hon Vernon Wilcox	Liberal	Camberwell	1956–1976
Frank Wilkes	Labor	Northcote	1957–1988
John Wilton	Labor	Broadmeadows	1962–1985
Ray Wiltshire	Liberal	Mulgrave	1955–1976

^{1} On 9 July 1965, the Liberal member for Caulfield, Alexander Fraser, died. Liberal candidate Ian McLaren won the resulting by-election on 18 September 1965.
^{2} On 19 August 1966, the Labor member for Grant, Roy Crick, died. Labor candidate Jack Ginifer won the resulting by-election on 8 October 1966.
