= Barry Steggall =

Australian politician

Member of Victorian Legislative Assembly for Swan Hill
- In office 7 May 1983 – 29 November 2002
- Preceded by: Alan Wood
- Succeeded by: Peter Walsh

Mayor of the City of Swan Hill
- In office 1980–1982

Councillor in the City of Swan Hill
- In office 1973–1983

Personal details
- Born: Barry Edward Hector Steggall; 19 August 1943 (age 82) Swan Hill, Victoria
- Party: National Party
- Spouse: Suzanne Margaret Harvey (m. 1972)
- Children: 1 son, 2 daughters
- Parent(s): Norman and Dorothy (née Horsefall) Steggall
- Occupation: Woolclasser

Barry Edward Hector Steggall (born 19 August 1943) is a former Australian politician. He was the National Party member for Swan Hill in the Victorian Legislative Assembly from 1983 to 2002.

Steggall was born in Swan Hill, Victoria, to primary producer Norman Henry Steggall and Dorothy Horsfall. He attended state schools at Canterbury, Fish Point and Swan Hill, and completed his education at Swan Hill High School. He received a Certificate of Wool Classing from the Gordon Institute of Technology in 1962, and embarked on a career in the wool industry. He was eventually president of APEX 1971–72. On 29 January 1972 he married Suzanne Margaret Harvey, with whom he had three children. He was a Swan Hill City Councillor 1973–83 (mayor 1980–82), and was the district president of the Country Party from 1976 to 1977.

In 1983, Steggall was elected as the National member for Swan Hill. He became Senior Parliamentary Secretary to the Premier in 1992 and Parliamentary Secretary for State Development in 1996. He was Secretary to the Coalition from 1992 to 1999, and following Jeff Kennett's defeat in 1999 became Shadow Minister for Agriculture and Deputy Leader of the National Party. He retired from politics in 2002.

Parliament of Victoria
| Preceded by Alan Wood | Member for Swan Hill; 1983–2002 | Succeeded by Peter Walsh |
