= 1946 Wimmera by-election =

9 February 1946
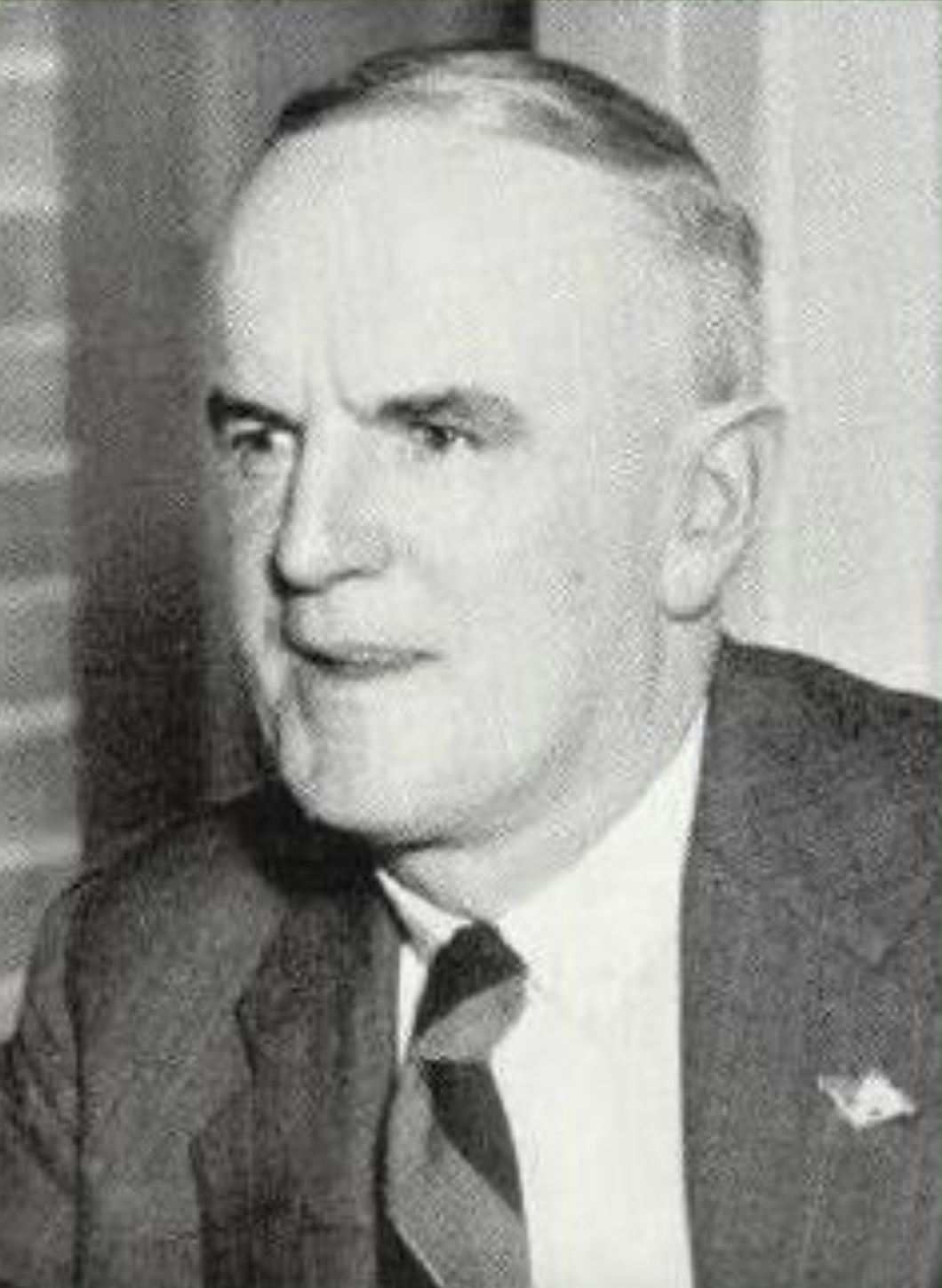
	First party	Second party	Third party
		CPA	IND
Candidate	Winton Turnbull	Cliff Everett	James Stoddart
Party	Country	Country	Independent Country
Popular vote	15,284	6,724	6,361
Percentage	43.09%	18.96%	17.93%
Swing	▲43.09pp	▲18.96pp	▲17.93pp
TPP	58.99%	41.01%
TPP Swing	▲58.99pp	▲41.01pp
MP before election
Alexander Wilson (Australian politician)
Independent
Elected MP
Winton Turnbull
Country

A by-election was held in the Wimmera electorate in regional Victoria on 9 February 1946, following the resignation of independent MP Alexander Wilson.

== Results ==
Wimmera by-election, 1946
Party	Candidate	Votes	%	±%
Country	Winton Turnbull	15,284	43.09	+43.09
Country	Cliff Everett	6,724	18.96	+18.96
Independent Country	James Stoddart	6,361	17.93	+17.93
Independent Labor	John Somerville Smith	2,923	8.24	+8.24
Independent	Arnold Eberle	2,042	5.71	+5.71
Independent Labor	Fred Arlington-Burke	1,824	5.14	+5.14
Independent	Louis Phillips	312	0.88	+0.88
Total formal votes		35,470	95.45	–2.41
Informal votes		1,692	4.55	+2.41
Turnout		37,162	82.89	–13.73
Two-party-preferred result
Country	Winton Turnbull	20,924	58.99	+58.99
Country	Cliff Everett	14,546	41.01	+41.01
Country gain from Independent Country		Swing	+16.24	
