= Alan Wood (Australian politician) =

Australian politician (1927–2005)

Alan Raymond Wood (18 June 1927 – 3 October 2005) was an Australian politician.

Wood was born at Swan Hill to real estate agent Henry Raymond Wood and Irene Elizabeth Faulkner. During World War II he served in the AIF, and on his return worked with the family real estate business. On 26 February 1954 he married (Dorothy) Joyce Wilkinson, with whom he had six children. From 1959 to 1974 he was a Swan Hill councillor, serving as the town's first mayor from 1964 to 1965.

In 1973 Wood was elected to the Victorian Legislative Assembly as the Liberal member for Swan Hill. In 1979 he was appointed Minister of Immigration and Ethnic Affairs, moving to Public Works and Property Services in December 1980. He resigned from parliament in March 1983.

Victorian Legislative Assembly
Preceded by Henry Broad	Member for Swan Hill; 1973–1983	Succeeded by Barry Steggall
