= Francis Old =

Australian politician

Francis Edward Old (24 November 1875 – 19 May 1950) was an Australian politician.

He was born in Dingee to farmer Thomas Spear Old and Charlotte Mitchell. He attended state schools at Dingee, and from 1892 was a farmer at Swan Hill. On 27 September 1903, he married Marion Richardson, with whom he had five children. From 1907 to 1919 he was based in Wakool in New South Wales, but from 1919 he returned to Swan Hill while retaining the New South Wales property.

He had been involved with the Farmers' and Settlers' Association in New South Wales and served on Wakool Shire Council from 1912 to 1913. In 1919 he won a by-election for the Victorian Legislative Assembly seat of Swan Hill, representing the Victorian Farmers' Union. He joined the Country Party on its formation and was Minister of Agriculture and Railways from 1923 to 1924 and Minister of Water Supply and Electrical Undertakings from 1935 to 1943; he was also Acting Premier from 1936 to 1937.

He was the Country Party's deputy leader twice, first from 1922 to 1924 and secondly from 1936 to 1937. Old was defeated in 1945 and died at Swan Hill in 1950.

Victorian Legislative Assembly
Preceded by Percy Stewart	Member for Swan Hill; 1919–1945	Succeeded by John Hipworth
