= Percy Stewart =

Australian politician (1885–1931)

The Honourable Percy Stewart
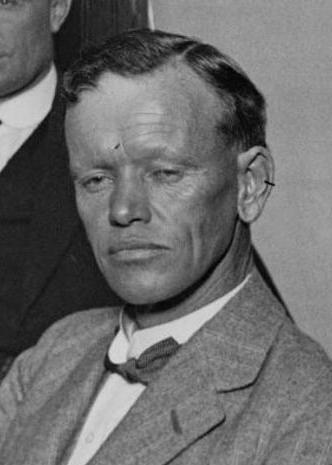
- Stewart in 1924

Minister for Works and Railways
- In office 9 February 1923 – 8 August 1924
- Prime Minister: Stanley Bruce
- Preceded by: Richard Foster
- Succeeded by: William Hill

Member of the Australian Parliament for Wimmera
- In office 13 December 1919 – 14 October 1931
- Preceded by: Sydney Sampson
- Succeeded by: Hugh McClelland

Personal details
- Born: 18 October 1885 Footscray, Victoria
- Died: 14 October 1931 (aged 45) Woomelang, Victoria
- Party: Country (1919–26); Country Progressive (1926–30); Independent (1930–31)
- Spouse: Edith Catherine Roberts
- Occupation: Farmer

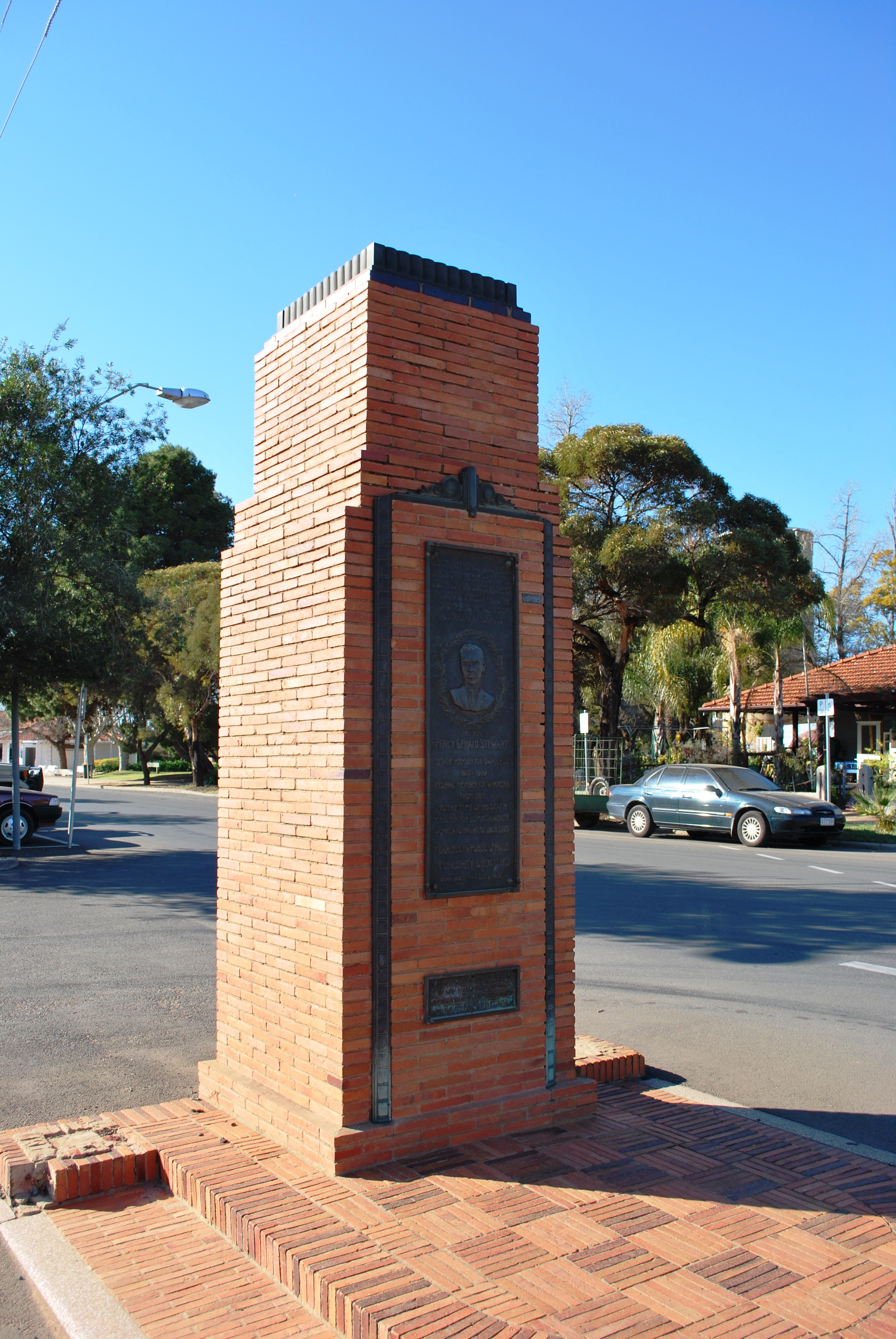
Memorial to Stewart at Red Cliffs, Victoria

Percy Gerald Stewart (18 October 1885 – 15 October 1931) was an Australian politician. He was an original member of the Victorian Farmers' Union and long a radical campaigner for farming interests. He helped bring down Stanley Bruce's government in 1929, but died soon after.

== Early life ==
Stewart was born in the Melbourne suburb of Footscray, Victoria and educated at Yarraville State School. He worked in Melbourne and western Victoria, including a period as a shepherd, and then went to sea. He gained a master's certificate, but gave up sailing after contracting malaria. He then travelled in Europe and Canada before returning to Australia in 1909. In 1913, he selected a block of land in the Mallee at Carwarp, but later sold it and moved to another farm at Carwarp West. In 1916 Stewart married Edith Catherine Roberts. During World War I, he volunteered three times for military service but was turned down on health grounds. He worked with the Victorian Department of Agriculture to develop new techniques to improve crops yields in the Mallee. He bought the Mildura Sunraysia Daily in 1924 and was its chairman until his death.

== Political career ==
=== Early involvement ===
Inspired by the Canadian grain growers' associations, Stewart helped found the Victorian Farmers' Union, which eventually developed into the Victorian branch of the Country Party. In September 1916, he was appointed to the VFU's central council and in November 1917 he won the Victorian Legislative Assembly seat of Swan Hill as one of four original VFU members. In parliament, he was highly independent and often voted with the Labor Party.

=== House of Representatives ===
Stewart resigned his state seat prior to the October 1919 federal election and won the seat of Wimmera, which he held to his death. He was one of five original members of the VFU in the House of Representatives and took a large part in negotiating the formation of the Bruce–Page coalition government in late 1922, and he became Minister for Works and Railways in the resulting ministry. As minister, he was also president of the River Murray Commission, which allowed him to press for the completion of the Hume Weir. He also helped to establish the irrigated citrus industry along the Murray River. On 28 August 1923, he turned the first sod on the construction of the provisional Parliament House in Canberra.

In August 1924, Stewart resigned his portfolio in protest at a deal between Bruce and Page that protected sitting members from opposition from coalition party candidates at elections, which he regarded as an unwarranted restriction on voters' choice. He and Albert Dunstan then established the Victorian Country Progressive Party, which held the balance of power in the Victorian Legislative Assembly in the late 1920s and sought to establish compulsory nationwide pools and guaranteed prices for wheat. This idea eventually led to the establishment of the Australian Wheat Board. Bruce campaigned against his re-election at the 1928 election and 1929 election, without success. In September 1929, he voted against Bruce's bill to abolish the Commonwealth Court of Conciliation and Arbitration, helping to bring down his government. After the election of the Scullin government in 1929, he worked closely with it and sought reduced tariffs and a range of government interventions to raise rural incomes.

In 1931 Stewart died of pneumonia at Woomelang survived by his wife.

== Notes ==
Victorian Legislative Assembly
Preceded by John Gray	Member for Swan Hill; 1917–1919	Succeeded by Francis Old
Parliament of Australia
Preceded by Sydney Sampson	Member for Wimmera; 1919–1931	Succeeded by Hugh McClelland
Political offices
Preceded by Richard Foster	Minister for Works and Railways; 1923–1924	Succeeded by William Hill
