= Pharez Phillips =

Australian politician

The Honourable Pharez Phillips
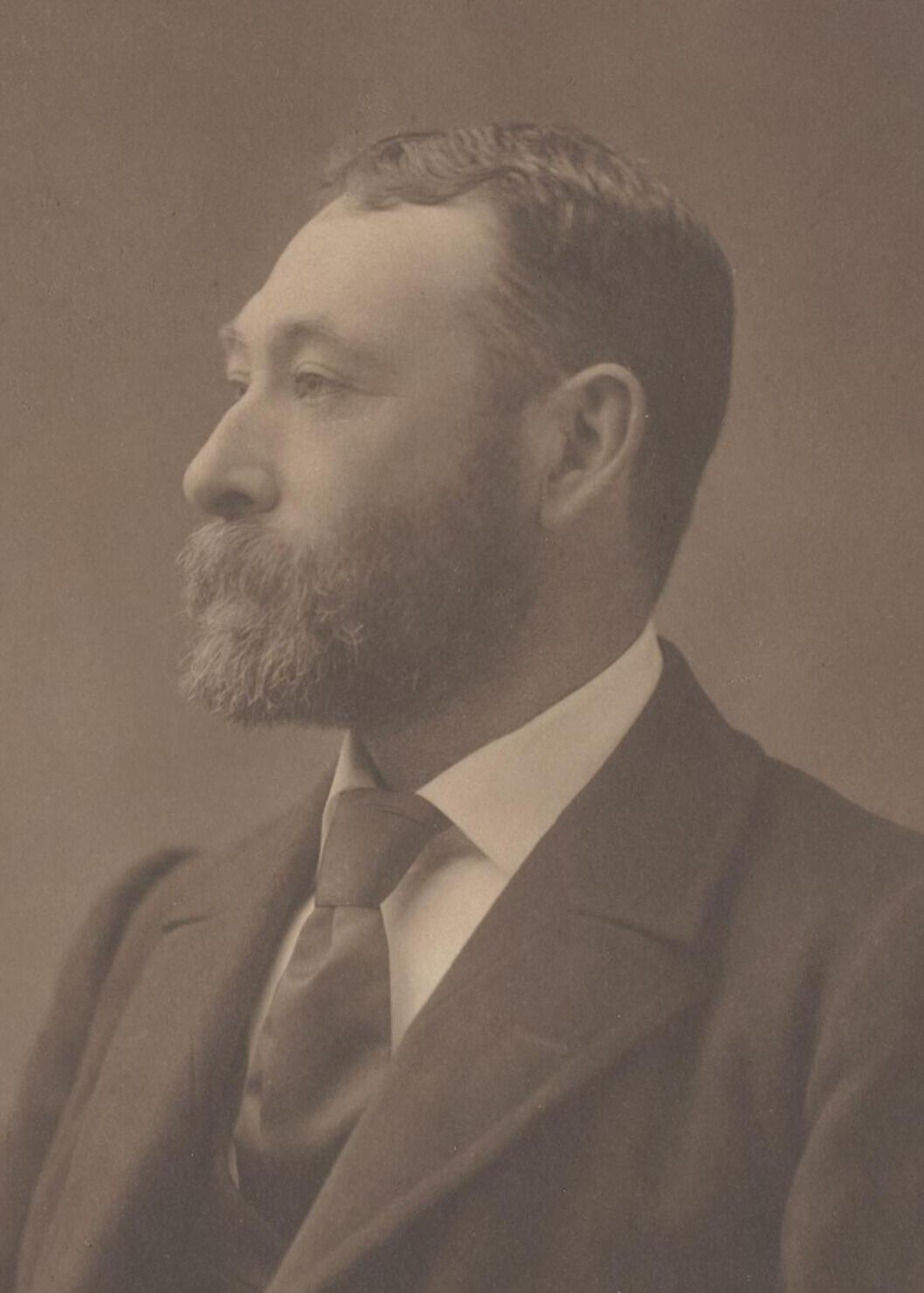

Member of the Australian Parliament for Wimmera
- In office 29 March 1901 – 8 November 1906
- Preceded by: New seat
- Succeeded by: Sydney Sampson

Personal details
- Born: 22 November 1855 Mount Blackwood, Victoria
- Died: 9 August 1914 (aged 58) Ayr, Scotland
- Party: Protectionist Party
- Occupation: Farmer

Pharez Phillips (22 November 1855 – 9 August 1914) was an Australian businessman and politician. He was a member of the House of Representatives from 1901 to 1906, representing the Victorian seat of Wimmera. He had earlier served in the Victorian Legislative Council from 1896 to 1901.

== Biography ==
Phillips was born on 22 November 1855 in Mount Blackwood, Victoria. He was of Jewish background.

Phillips was educated at Grenville College in Ballarat before becoming a shopkeeper, farmer, and St Arnaud Town Councillor where he was three times president. He was a notable community leader in the Wimmera area. In 1896, he was elected to the Victorian Legislative Council for North Western Province, and was made an Honorary Minister in 1900. He resigned this position in 1901 in order to contest the first federal election, winning the Australian House of Representatives seat of Wimmera for the Protectionist Party. He held the seat until his retirement in 1906. Phillips died in 1914 in Ayr, Scotland.

== Personal life ==
Phillips died on 9 August 1914 in Ayr, Scotland, aged 58. His estate was valued for probate at nearly £36,000 (equivalent to $4,200,000 in 2022).

Parliament of Australia
New division	Member for Wimmera; 1901–1906	Succeeded by Sydney Sampson
