= Winton Turnbull =

Australian politician (1899–1980)

Sir Winton Turnbull CBE
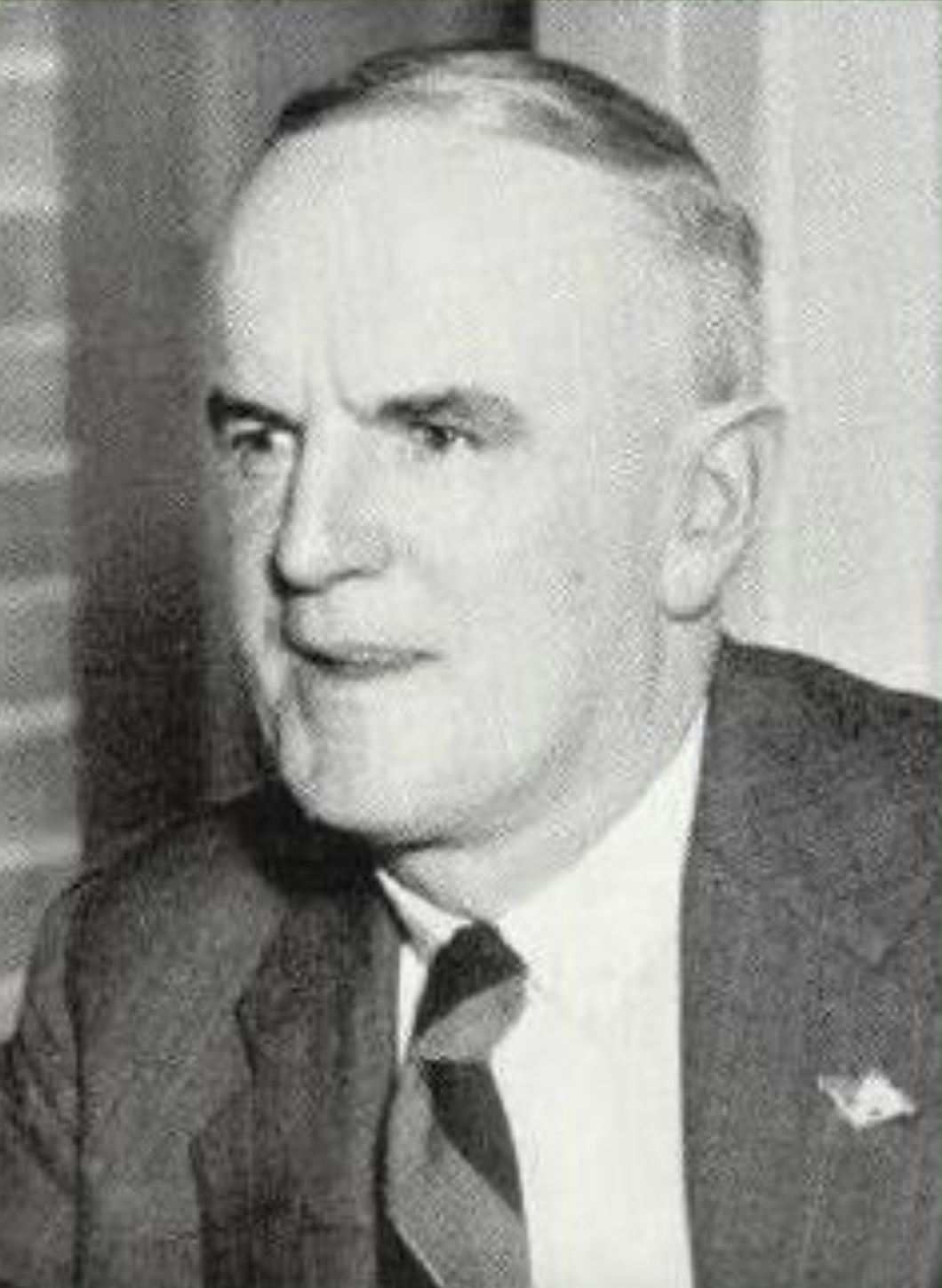

Member of the Australian Parliament for Wimmera
- In office 9 February 1946 – 10 December 1949
- Preceded by: Alexander Wilson
- Succeeded by: William Lawrence

Member of the Australian Parliament for Mallee
- In office 10 December 1949 – 2 November 1972
- Preceded by: New seat
- Succeeded by: Peter Fisher

Personal details
- Born: 13 December 1899 Hamilton, Victoria
- Died: 15 January 1980 (aged 80) Bendigo, Victoria
- Party: Australian Country Party
- Spouse: Beryl Bradley
- Occupation: Soldier

Sir Winton George Turnbull, CBE (13 December 1899 – 15 January 1980) was an Australian politician.

== Early life ==
Turnbull was born at Hamilton, Victoria to farmer Adam Beverly Turnbull and Georgina Agnes, née Drummond. He was mostly educated by his mother, although he did attend state schools for short periods. Following his father's death in 1922, Turnbull and his mother moved to Warracknabeal, where he was employed as an auctioneer. He took part in several public speaking competitions before he and his mother moved to Essendon 1933. During this time, he became interested in politics, joining the Country Party. He attempted to run for the Country Party in the House of Representatives seat of Bendigo in 1937, and attempted to take the Victorian Legislative Assembly seat of Lowan in 1940, but was unsuccessful in both.

In July 1940, Turnbull enlisted in the Australian Imperial Force and was sent to Malaya. He was captured at the 1942 fall of Singapore and was a prisoner of war for three and a half years at Changi, where he organised debates among the prisoners. At the end of the war he returned to Australia, unsuccessfully contesting the Legislative Assembly seat of Borung.

== Federal politics ==
In 1946, Turnbull was elected in a by-election to the federal seat of Wimmera for the Country Party. He was subsequently discharged from the army in order to sit in the Parliament. He married tailoress Beryl Bradley on 22 December 1947 at Essendon.

Turnbull was a dedicated parliamentarian who never missed a parliamentary sitting. After his home was transferred to the newly created Mallee in 1949; he transferred there and was easily elected. He was appointed Country Party whip in 1956, and in 1968 was appointed a CBE. He was knighted in 1972 and retired from parliament later that year. He died at Bendigo on 15 January 1980, survived by his wife; they had no children.

A story told about Turnbull's interactions with Gough Whitlam (perhaps apocryphal) is that during a noisy parliamentary moment, Turnbull said "After all I am a country member". To which Whitlam retorted "I remember".

Parliament of Australia
Preceded by Alexander Wilson	Member for Wimmera; 1946–1949	Succeeded by William Lawrence
Preceded by new seat	Member for Mallee; 1949–1972	Succeeded by Peter Fisher
