= Hugh McClelland (politician) =

Australian politician

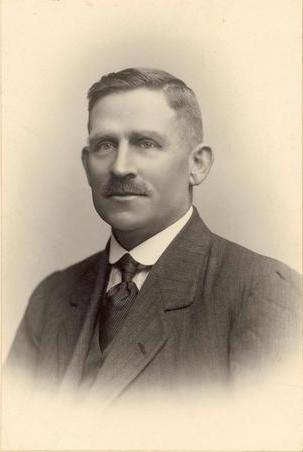

Member of the Australian Parliament for Wimmera
- In office 19 December 1931 – 23 October 1937
- Preceded by: Percy Stewart
- Succeeded by: Alexander Wilson

Personal details
- Born: 27 December 1875 Smeaton, Victoria
- Died: 14 December 1958 (aged 82)
- Party: Australian Country Party
- Occupation: Farmer

Hugh McClelland (27 December 1875 – 14 December 1958) was an Australian politician.

He was born in Smeaton, Victoria, his family reportedly having come to Victoria with the Henty family. He was educated at state schools before becoming a farmer at Berriwillock. He was president and a councillor of the Shire of Wycheproof, chairman of the Victorian Wheat Growers' Corporation, an executive member of the Chamber of Agriculture, and a member of the advisory committee to the Wheat Board. He was an unsuccessful candidate for the Victorian Legislative Assembly seat of Swan Hill at the 1914 state election and 1917 state election.

In 1931, he was elected to the Australian House of Representatives as the Country Party member for Wimmera, and was re-elected in 1934. In 1937, McClelland lost Country Party preselection for the 1937 election to Alexander Wilson, who unlike McClelland opposed the federal composite ministry. He recontested as an unendorsed candidate, and though federal Country Party leader Earle Page came to his electorate to campaign for him, was defeated by Wilson. McClelland died in 1958.

Parliament of Australia
Preceded by Percy Stewart	Member for Wimmera; 1931–1937	Succeeded by Alexander Wilson
