= Sydney Sampson =

Australian politician (1863–1948)

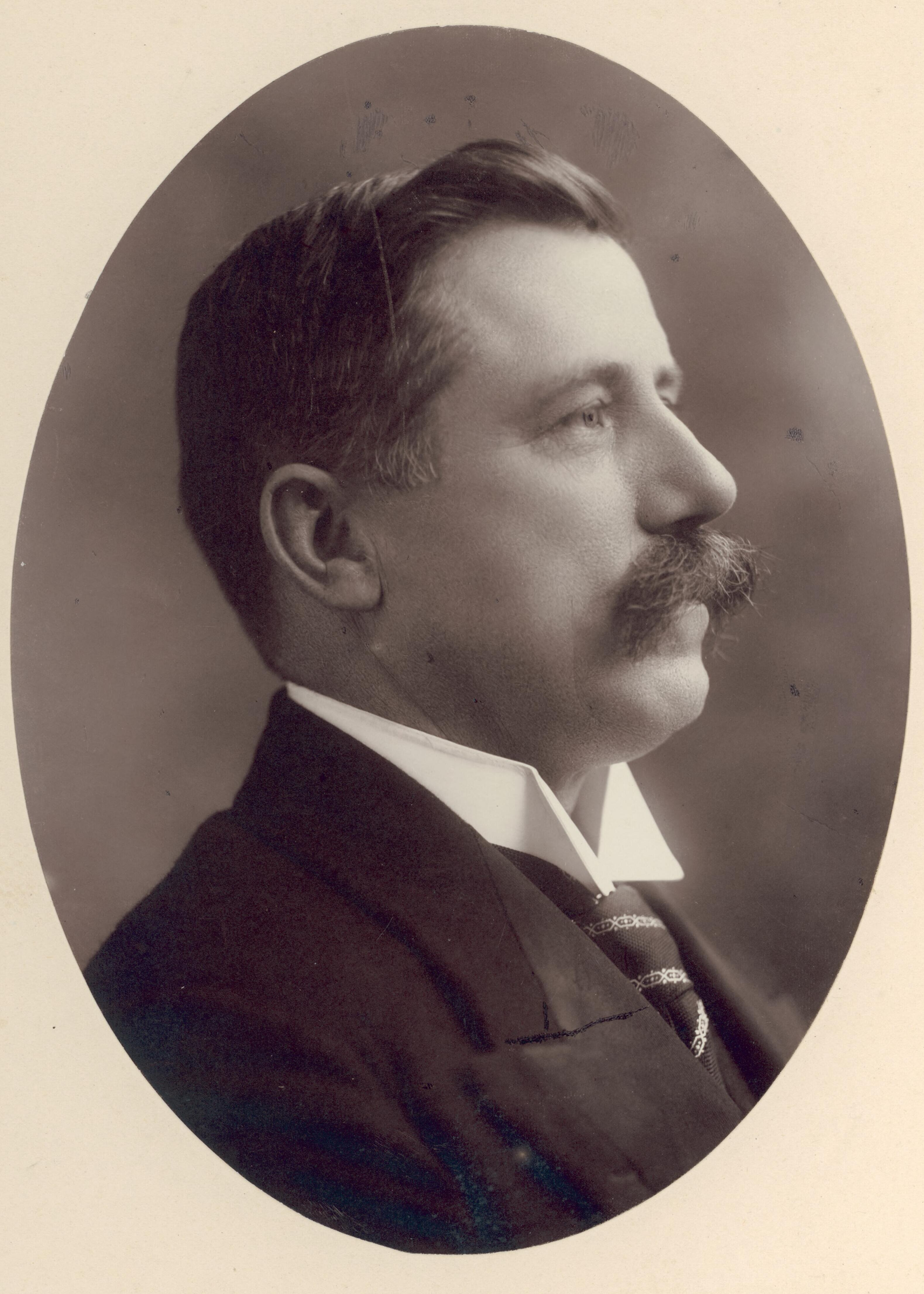

Member of the Australian Parliament for Wimmera
- In office 12 December 1906 – 13 December 1919
- Preceded by: Pharez Phillips
- Succeeded by: Percy Stewart

Personal details
- Born: 1863 Creswick, Victoria, Australia
- Died: 24 March 1948 (aged 84–85) Camberwell, Victoria, Australia
- Party: Ind. Protectionist (1906–09); Liberal (1909–17); Nationalist (1917–19)
- Spouse: Matilda Brewer (m. 1891)
- Relations: Robert Menzies (nephew); James Menzies (brother-in-law)

Sydney Sampson (1863 – 24 March 1948) was an Australian businessman and politician who served as a member of the House of Representatives from 1906 to 1919, representing the Division of Wimmera in Victoria. Outside of politics, he was a newspaper proprietor.

== Early life ==
Sampson was born in 1863 in Creswick, Victoria. He was the fourth of seven children born to Mary Jane (née Organ) and John Sampson.

Sampson's parents were both immigrants from Cornwall, lured by the Victorian gold rush. His mother died when he was about eight years old, and his father remarried to a widow with four children of her own; two children from that marriage brought his total number of siblings to twelve. Sampson's father worked initially as a gold miner and later as a wood carter. He was president of the Creswick Miners' Association, which he had helped found with William Spence, and later treasurer of the local branch of the Amalgamated Miners' Association. He was forced out of the industry by mine owners in response to his leadership of a strike.

Sampson moved to Warracknabeal, and farmed in the Mallee for several years. At the time of his first daughter's birth, which occurred in Birchip the following year, he listed his profession as "rabbit inspector". By 1893, Sampson was living in the small township of Jeparit, where he had bought the general store. He started a local newspaper, the Jeparit Leader, and soon sold the store to his brother-in-law James Menzies in order to concentrate on the paper. He eventually sold the Leader in 1899 and purchased the Warracknabeal Herald, which had a larger market.

== Politics ==
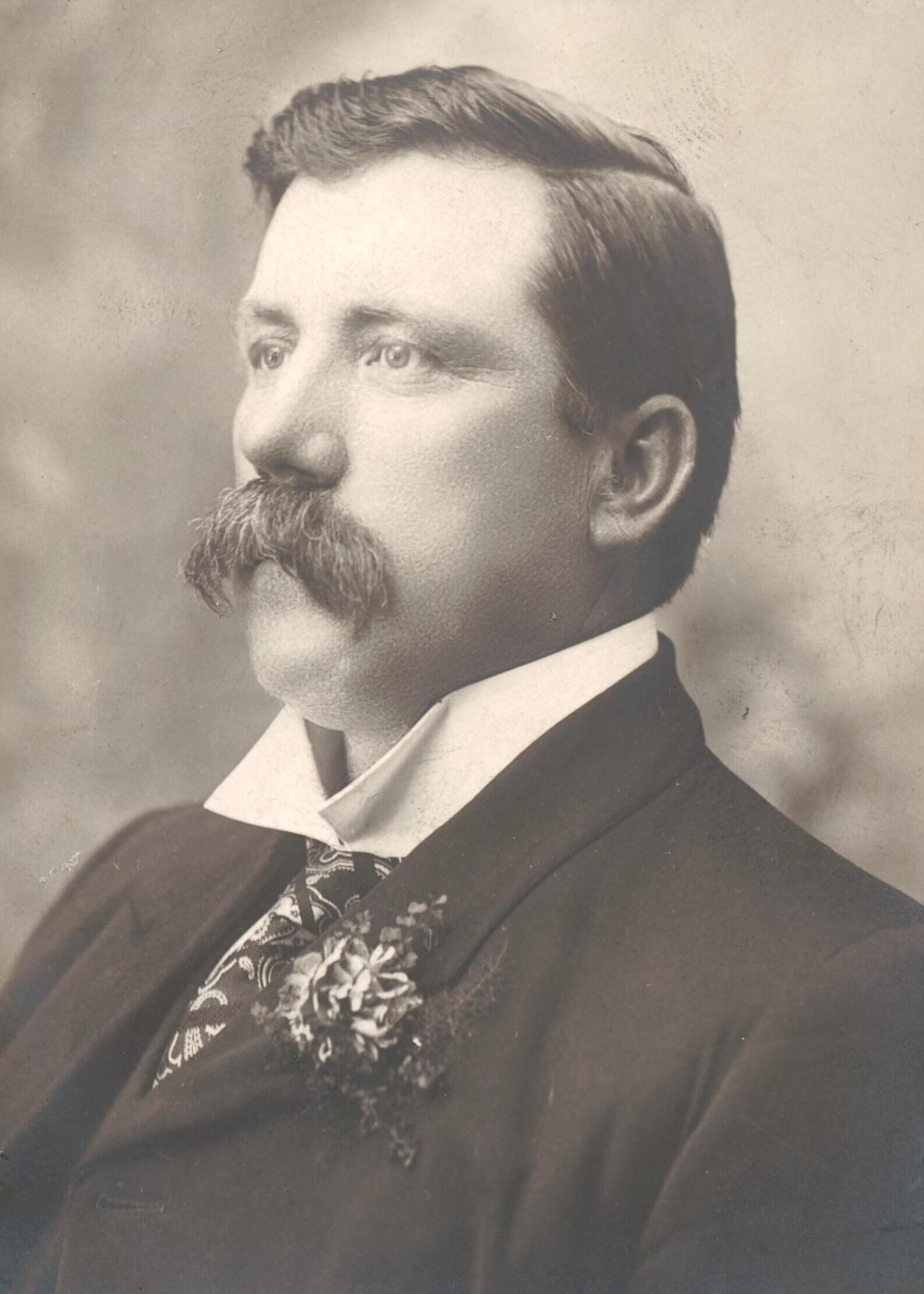
Sampson as a member of parliament

At the 1906 federal election, Sampson was elected to the House of Representatives in the Division of Wimmera, winning 51.6 percent of the vote against four other candidates. He won the endorsement of the local Protectionist Associations, but refused to guarantee support for the Deakin government and sat in parliament as an "independent Protectionist and anti-Socialist". Sampson eventually joined the new Commonwealth Liberal Party in 1909 and then the Nationalist Party in 1917. He was re-elected unopposed in 1914 and 1917, but in 1919 lost his seat to Percy Stewart of the Victorian Farmers' Union. Sampson was a member of the Committee on Public Works from 1914 to 1919, and served on three royal commissions. He was a supporter of compulsory voting, and proposed an amendment to that effect during the debate over what became the Commonwealth Electoral Act 1918. His amendment was defeated comfortably, but a similar amendment was passed in 1924 and is still in force.

== Later years ==
After losing his seat in parliament, Sampson returned to the newspaper trade, and was involved with various papers in Melbourne's eastern suburbs. He was a director of the Country Press Co-operative of Victoria, and also served on the boards of a pottery firm and a fire insurance company. He was a mentor to his nephew Robert Menzies, who followed him into politics and would become the longest-serving Prime Minister of Australia.

== Personal life ==
In 1891, Sampson married Matilda Brewer in St Arnaud; they had two daughters together. His daughter Beryl Trigellis-Smith was a pioneering nurse, psychologist and probation officer.

Sampson died at his home in Camberwell on 24 March 1948. He was buried at the Springvale Botanical Cemetery.

Parliament of Australia
Preceded by Pharez Phillips	Member for Wimmera; 1906–1919	Succeeded by Percy Stewart
