= City of Swan Hill =

Local government area in Victoria, Australia

Coordinates: 35°21′00″S 143°34′00″E

- Local government area
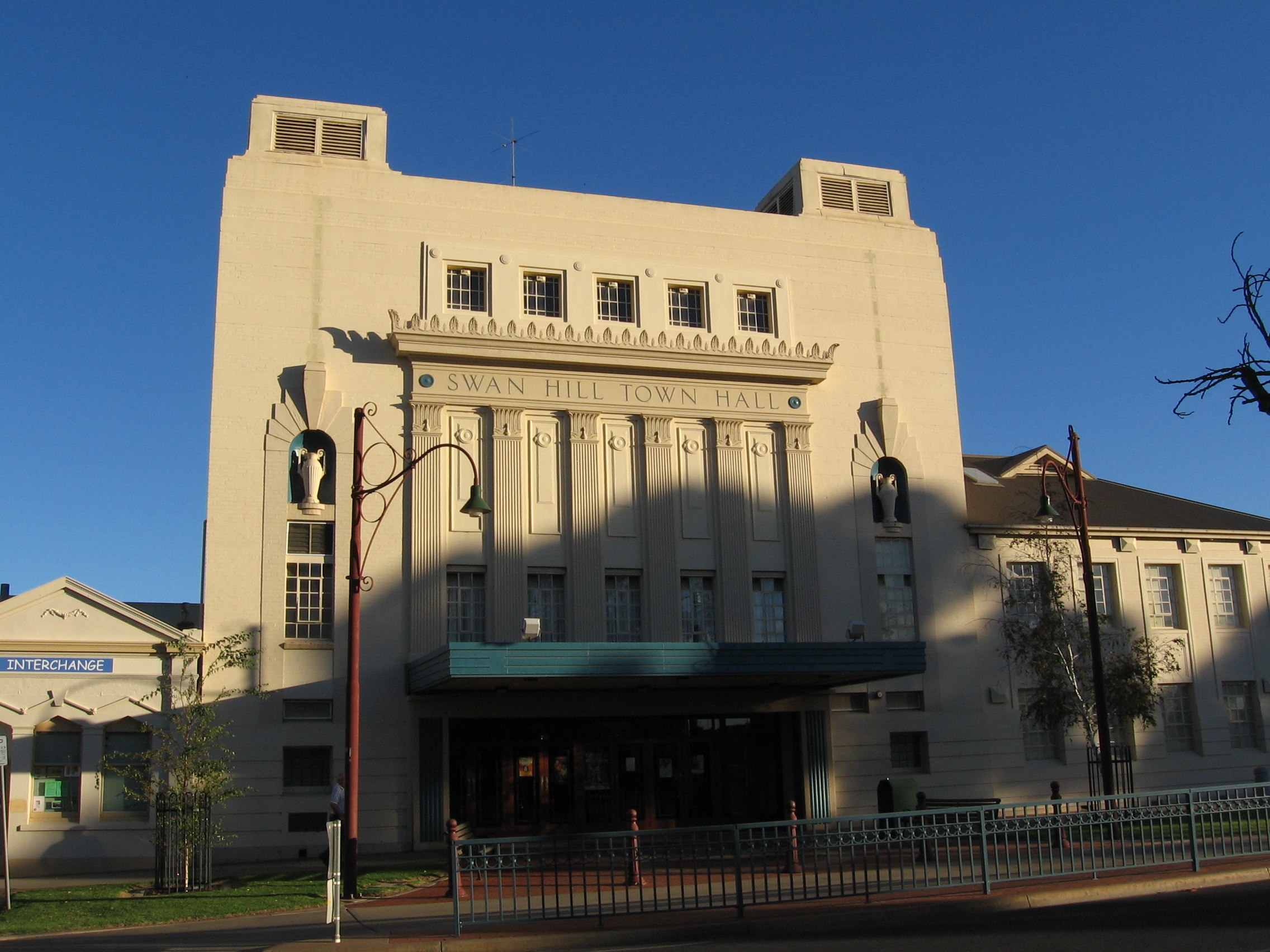
- Swan Hill Town Hall
- The City of Swan Hill as at its dissolution in 1995
- Country: Australia
- State: Victoria
- Region: Mallee
- Established: 1939
- Council seat: Swan Hill

Area
  - Total: 13.66 km^{2} (5.27 sq mi)

Population
  - Total(s): 9,750 (1992)
  - Density: 713.8/km^{2} (1,848.6/sq mi)
- County: Tatchera
LGAs around City of Swan Hill
Swan Hill (S)	City of Swan Hill	Murray River (NSW)

The City of Swan Hill was a local government area in northwestern Victoria, Australia, along the Murray River. The city covered an area of 13.66 square kilometres (5.27 sq mi), and existed from 1939 until 1995.

== History ==
Swan Hill was originally part of the Swan Hill Road District, which initially covered most of northwestern Victoria, and was incorporated in 1862. The Shire of Castle Donnington severed from the district on 30 May 1893, and on 31 May 1904, the Castle Donnington municipality was renamed and gazetted as the Shire of Swan Hill.

A small part of the shire, in and near the town of Swan Hill, severed on 31 May 1939, and was incorporated as the Borough of Swan Hill, which became the City of Swan Hill on 12 March 1965.

On 20 January 1995, the City of Swan Hill was abolished, and along with the Shire of Swan Hill and the Tresco district of the Shire of Kerang, was merged into the newly created Rural City of Swan Hill.

=== Wards ===
Swan Hill was not divided into wards, and its nine councillors represented all electors in the city.

== Population ==
Year	Population
1954	5,197
1958	5,930*
1961	6,186
1966	7,376
1971	7,712
1976	7,857
1981	8,398
1986	8,907
1991	9,357

* Estimate in the 1958 Victorian Year Book.
