= Robert King (Victorian politician) =

Australian politician

The Honourable Robert King OBE
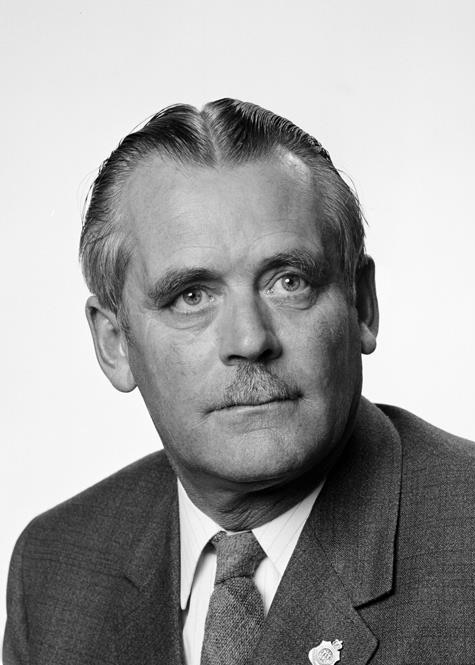
- King c. 1971

Member of the Australian Parliament for Wimmera
- In office 22 November 1958 – 10 November 1977
- Preceded by: William Lawrence
- Succeeded by: Division abolished

Assistant Minister for Primary Industry
- In office 5 October 1971 – 5 December 1972
- Prime Minister: William McMahon

Personal details
- Born: 22 March 1920 Warracknabeal, Victoria, Australia
- Died: 30 June 1991 (aged 71)
- Party: Australian Country Party
- Education: Carey Baptist Grammar School
- Occupation: Farmer

Robert Shannon King OBE (22 March 1920 – 30 June 1991) was an Australian politician. Born in Warracknabeal, Victoria, he attended Carey Baptist Grammar School in Melbourne before serving in the military 1940–45. He returned to Warracknabeal as a farmer and grazier, and became an official of the Victorian Country Party. In 1958, he was elected to the Australian House of Representatives as the Country Party member for Wimmera. On 5 October 1971 he was appointed Assistant Minister assisting the Minister for Primary Industry, holding that this position until the McMahon Government's defeat on 5 December 1972.

King's seat of Wimmera was abolished in 1977, and he retired from parliament. However his political activity continued, and he was campaign manager for Victorian State MP Bill McGrath in the 1979, 1982, 1985 and 1988 state elections. He was appointed an Officer of the Order of the British Empire (OBE) in the 1982 Birthday Honours. King died in 1991.

Parliament of Australia
Preceded by William Lawrence	Member for Wimmera; 1958 – 1977	Succeeded by Seat abolished
