= Division of Wimmera =

Former Australian federal electoral division

Wimmera Australian House of Representatives Division
- Created: 1901
- Abolished: 1977
- Namesake: Wimmera region

The Division of Wimmera was an Australian electoral division in the state of Victoria. It was named after the Wimmera region in which it was partially located. The division was proclaimed in 1900, and was one of the original 65 divisions to be contested at the first federal election.

It originally encompassed Mildura, Swan Hill and Warracknabeal. In 1949, the Division of Mallee took the seat's northern area.

By the time the seat was abolished on 31 October 1977, it had drifted south and grown smaller to only include Ararat, Horsham and Maryborough. It become part of the Division of Mallee, reuniting the two divisions.

== Members ==
Image	Member	Party	Term	Notes
	Pharez Phillips (1855–1914)	Protectionist	29 March 1901 – 8 November 1906	Previously a member of the Victorian Legislative Council. Retired
	Sydney Sampson (1863–1948)	Independent Protectionist	12 December 1906 – 26 May 1909	Lost seat
	Sydney Sampson (1863–1948)	Liberal	26 May 1909 – 17 February 1917	Lost seat
	Sydney Sampson (1863–1948)	Nationalist	17 February 1917 – 13 December 1919	Lost seat
	Percy Stewart (1885–1931)	Victorian Farmers' Union	13 December 1919 – 22 January 1920	Served as minister under Bruce. Died in office
	Percy Stewart (1885–1931)	Country	22 January 1920 – April 1926	Served as minister under Bruce. Died in office
	Percy Stewart (1885–1931)	Country Progressive	April 1926 – October 1930	Served as minister under Bruce. Died in office
	Percy Stewart (1885–1931)	Independent Country	October 1930 – 14 October 1931	Served as minister under Bruce. Died in office
	Hugh McClelland (1875–1958)	Country	19 December 1931 – 23 October 1937	Lost seat
	Alexander Wilson (1889–1954)	United Country Party of Victoria	23 October 1937 – 31 December 1945	Resigned to become Administrator of Norfolk Island
	Winton Turnbull (1899–1980)	Country	9 February 1946 – 10 December 1949	Transferred to the newly created Division of Mallee
	William Lawrence (1906–2004)	Liberal	10 December 1949 – 22 November 1958	Lost seat
	Robert King (1920–1991)	Country	22 November 1958 – 2 May 1975	Retired after Wimmera was abolished in 1977
	Robert King (1920–1991)	National Country	2 May 1975 – 10 November 1977	Retired after Wimmera was abolished in 1977
