= William Lawrence (Australian politician) =

Australian politician

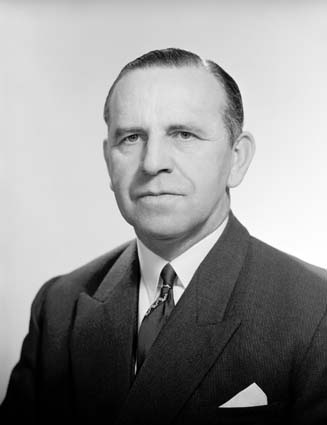

Member of the Australian Parliament for Wimmera
- In office 10 December 1949 – 22 November 1958
- Preceded by: Winton Turnbull
- Succeeded by: Robert King

Personal details
- Born: 28 July 1906 Horsham, Victoria
- Died: 13 January 2004 (aged 97)
- Party: Liberal
- Education: University of Melbourne
- Occupation: Dentist

William Robert Lawrence (28 July 1906 – 13 January 2004) was an Australian politician and dentist. He was a member of the House of Representatives from 1949 to 1958, representing the Victorian seat of Wimmera for the Liberal Party. Before his election to federal parliament he served as mayor of Horsham, Victoria.

== Early life ==
Lawrence was born on 28 July 1906 in Horsham, Victoria. He received his early education at Horsham State School. He subsequently moved to Melbourne to study dentistry, completing the degree of Bachelor of Dental Science at the University of Melbourne. He also obtained the Licence of Dental Surgery through the Faculty of Dental Surgery of the Royal College of Surgeons of England.

After obtaining his qualifications, Lawrence returned to Horsham and established his own dental practice. He was also a consulting dental surgeon at Horsham Base Hospital. He was elected to the Horsham Town Council in 1944. He was subsequently elected mayor of Horsham in 1947. He also served terms as president of the town's Apex Club and music club, and was a member of the state advisory committee for the Australian Broadcasting Commission (ABC).

== Politics ==
In February 1949, Lawrence was involved in the formation of the Liberal and Country Party, which was intended as a merger of the state branches of the Liberal Party and Country Party but saw only a handful of Country Party members join. He was elected to the party's state provisional committee.

Lawrence was elected to the House of Representatives at the 1949 federal election, winning the seat of Wimmerra for the Liberal Party following a redistribution which saw the incumbent Country Party MP Winton Turnbull swap seats. He retained Wimmera for the Liberal Party at the 1951, 1954 and 1955 elections.

In parliament, Lawrence served on the Joint Statutory Committee on Public Works from 1953 to 1958, including as chair from 1956. He was also a member of the National Capital Planning Committee. He was an unsuccessful candidate for the Coalition's nomination for Speaker of the House of Representatives in 1956, losing to John McLeay.

Lawrence was defeated by the Country Party candidate Robert King at the 1958 election, who received strong preference flows from the Australian Labor Party and Democratic Labor Party.

== Later life ==
Lawrence made an unsuccessful attempt to reclaim his seat at the 1961 election. He returned to dentistry and died on 13 January 2004, aged 97.

Parliament of Australia
Preceded by Winton Turnbull	Member for Wimmera; 1949–1958	Succeeded by Robert King
