= John Hipworth =

Australian politician

John Alexander Hipworth ED (18 May 1899 – 9 January 1979) was an Australian politician.

Hipworth was born in Mathoura in New South Wales to labourer Benjamin Hipworth and Margaret Tully McKenzie. During World War I he was an army instructor, and he was wounded in France in 1917. After the war he farmed near Kerang, and he remained in the military with the 17th Light Horse, becoming commanding officer in 1936. On 17 June 1921 he married Violet Bessie Mapson, with whom he had five children. During World War II he was a lieutenant-colonel.

Shortly after his return from the war in 1945, Hipworth was elected to the Victorian Legislative Assembly as the Country Party member for Swan Hill. He defected to the newly renamed Liberal and Country Party in 1949 and assumed the position of Assistant Minister of Public Works, Housing and Electrical Undertakings, which he held until 1950. He was a supporter of Thomas Hollway, and in 1952 was Minister of Lands, Soldier Settlement and Water Supply in Hollway's seventy-hour government. He lost his seat to a Country Party candidate in 1952, and contested it again as an independent Liberal in 1955, 1958 and 1961; on the last occasion he was formally expelled from the Liberal and Country Party for opposing an endorsed candidate. He worked as a real estate agent in Kerang until 1963, and served on Kerang Shire Council from 1960 to 1963. He retired to Bendigo in 1963 but returned to Kerang in 1973. Hipworth died at Kerang in 1979.

Victorian Legislative Assembly
Preceded by Francis Old	Member for Swan Hill; 1945–1952	Succeeded by Harold Stirling
