= Henry Broad =

Australian politician

Henry George Broad (4 May 1910 – 17 August 2001) was an Australian politician.

He was born at St Arnaud to farmer George William Broad and teaching assistant Frances Jane Evans, and attended state schools. He became a farmer of wheat and sheep at Woomelang, and was secretary of the local Country Party branch in 1936. On 29 October 1960 he married Heather Anne McLean, with whom he had two sons. He served on Wycheproof Shire Council from 1953, and was president from 1960 to 1961, 1967 to 1968 and 1979 to 1980. In 1968 he was elected to the Victorian Legislative Assembly for Swan Hill, winning a by-election for the seat. He was defeated by a Liberal candidate in 1973. Broad remained active in local politics and was president of his local Country Party branch. He died at Wycheproof in 2001.

Victorian Legislative Assembly
Preceded by Harold Stirling	Member for Swan Hill; 1968–1973	Succeeded by Alan Wood
