= Alexander Wilson (Australian politician) =

Australian wheat farmer and politician

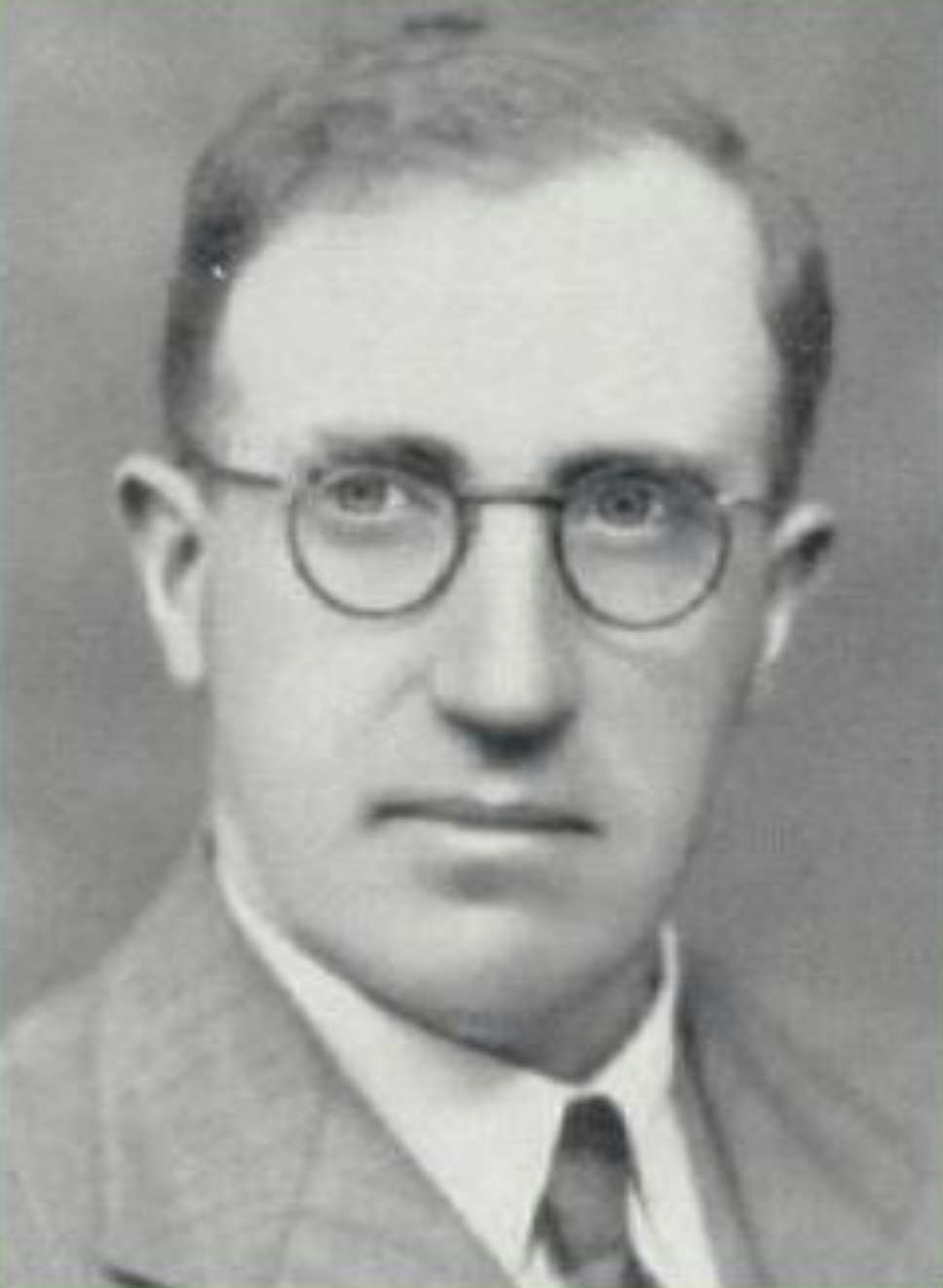

Member of the Australian Parliament for Wimmera
- In office 23 October 1937 – 31 December 1945
- Preceded by: Hugh McClelland
- Succeeded by: Winton Turnbull

Personal details
- Born: 7 June 1889 County Down, Ireland
- Died: 26 January 1954 (aged 64) Richmond, Victoria, Australia
- Party: United Country Party of Victoria
- Occupation: Farmer

Alexander Wilson (7 June 1889 – 26 January 1954) was an Australian wheat farmer and federal politician who played a key role in the downfall of the Fadden government in 1941.

== Biography ==
Born in County Down, Ulster, Ireland (now in Northern Ireland), Wilson was educated in Belfast and migrated to Australia in 1908, becoming a farmer at Ultima, Victoria.

Wilson was a prominent leader of Victorian wheat growers, becoming president of the Victorian Wheat Growers' Association. He successfully stood as the United Country Party (UCP) of Victoria candidate at the 1937 Australian election for the House of Representatives seat of Wimmera against the sitting Australian Country Party-endorsed member Hugh McClelland. Wilson and the Victorian UCP were opposed to the federal party's coalition with the United Australia Party. The Victorian UCP was not affiliated with the federal party at this time.

In parliament Wilson often voted with the opposition Australian Labor Party, and it was "common knowledge that Labor members were now working closely with Wilson".

Wilson easily retained his seat at the 1940 Australian election, remaining endorsed by the UCP of Victoria. Prime Minister Arthur Fadden of the Australian Country Party presided over a minority government, with Wilson and fellow cross-bencher Arthur Coles providing their support. The two independents held the balance of power in the House of Representatives.

In 1941, Wilson and Coles voted against the Budget, bringing down Fadden's government. Governor-General Lord Gowrie was reluctant to call an election for a Parliament barely a year old, especially given the international situation. He summoned Coles and Wilson and made them promise that if he named Labor leader John Curtin prime minister, they would support him for the remainder of the term to end the instability in government. The independents agreed, and Wilson supported the Curtin government from then on. Wilson retained his seat at the 1943 election, again endorsed by the UCP of Victoria. Around this time, the UCP re-established ties with the Australian Country Party.

Wilson remained in parliament until his retirement on 31 December 1945 to become the Administrator of Norfolk Island, a position he held until 1952. He retired to a farm at Swan Hill and died in 1954.

== Sources ==
- Abjorensen, N. (2016) The Manner of Their Going, Australian Scholarly Publishing: Kew. ISBN 978 1 925333 21 3.

Parliament of Australia
Preceded by Hugh McClelland	Member for Wimmera; 1937–1945	Succeeded by Winton Turnbull
Political offices
Preceded by Charles Rosenthal	Administrator of Norfolk Island; 1946–1952	Succeeded by Colin Hugh Boyd Norman
