= Harold Stirling =

Australian politician

Harold Victor Stirling (7 April 1904 – 23 July 1968) was an Australian politician.

Stirling was born at Carisbrook second child dairy farmer Henry Stirling and Phillis née Walker. He attended local schools and worked for the State Electricity Commission before assuming control of the family property at Mead in 1929. Around this time he married Philippa Kate "Kitty" Grills, with whom he had three sons and a daughter. Prominent in local agricultural circles, he served on Cohuna Shire Council from 1944 to 1959 (president 1949–50) and was national president of the Primary Producers' Union from 1949 to 1952.

In 1952 Stirling was elected to the Victorian Legislative Assembly as the Country Party member for Swan Hill. He served until his death at Kerang on 23 July 1968.

Victorian Legislative Assembly
| Preceded by John Hipworth | Member for Swan Hill; 1952–1968 | Succeeded by Henry Broad |
