= John Gray (Victorian politician, died 1925) =

Australian politician

John Gray (c. 1853 – 7 January 1925) was an Australian politician.

Born at Castlemaine to James and Anna Gray, he attended Dame School, Swan Hill State School and Brighton Grammar School before working near Swan Hill on farming stations. He was a mail contractor from Swan Hill to Euston in 1881 but established a stock agency in Swan Hill after eighteen months. In 1882 he married Annie Tuck, with whom he had five children. In 1891, having inherited his father's punting service across the Murray River, he erected a pontoon bridge. He was a Swan Hill Shire Councillor from 1885 to 1888 and from 1889 to 1893, serving as president from 1892 to 1893; he was then a Castle Donnington Shire Councillor (renamed Swan Hill in 1904) from 1893 to 1907, serving as president for three terms (1893–95, 1896–97, 1903–04). In 1904 he was elected to the Victorian Legislative Assembly as the member for Swan Hill, serving until 1917; he was a Liberal and then a Nationalist. He was a minister without portfolio from 1913 to 1917. Gray died in Swan Hill in 1925.
