= Electoral district of Swan Hill =

Former electoral district of Victoria, Australia

Swan Hill Victoria—Legislative Assembly
- State: Victoria
- Created: 1904
- Abolished: 2014
- Namesake: Swan Hill
- Electors: 33,073 (2010)
- Area: 28,093 km^{2} (10,846.8 sq mi)
- Demographic: Rural
- Coordinates: 35°0′S 142°30′E

The Electoral district of Swan Hill was a rural Lower House electoral district of the Victorian Parliament. It was located within the Northern Victoria Region of the Legislative Council.

The area had previously been part of the electoral districts of Wimmera (1851-89), Crowlands (1858-77), and Donald & Swan Hill (1889-1904).

At its beginning in 1904, the district spanned the Victorian Mallee region, covering not only Swan Hill and its surrounds, but also the Mildura area. This changed in 1927, with the creation of the electoral district of Mildura. It was held by a conservative party for its entire existence. For most of the time from 1917 onward, it was held by what became the National Party. The Liberals held the seat for most of the 1970s, during the height of their dominance in the state. However, the Nationals regained it in a 1983 by-election and held it until the seat was abolished in 2014.

At its end in 2014, the district included the towns of Birchip, Charlton, Donald, Kerang, Murtoa, St Arnaud, Sea Lake, Warracknabeal, Wedderburn and Wycheproof, as well as the titular city of Swan Hill. Natural features of the electorate included Lake Tyrrell and the Murray River, which was a popular tourist destination and the centre of a flourishing irrigation area. Farming and agriculture were important industries throughout the region.

Due to the region making up an increasingly smaller proportion of the state's population, in 2014 it became part of the electoral district of Murray Plains.

== Members for Swan Hill ==
Member	Party	Term
John Gray	Ministerialist	1904–1917
John Gray	Independent	1904–1917
John Gray	Commonwealth Liberal	1904–1917
John Gray	Nationalist	1904–1917
Percy Stewart	Farmers Union	1917–1919
Francis Old	Farmers Union	1919–1945
Francis Old	Country	1919–1945
John Hipworth	Country	1945–1949
John Hipworth	Liberal	1949–1952
Harold Stirling	Country	1952–1968
Henry Broad	Country	1968–1973
Alan Wood	Liberal	1973–1983
Barry Steggall	National	1983–2002
Peter Walsh	National	2002–2014

== Election results ==
2010 Victorian state election: Swan Hill
Party	Candidate	Votes	%	±%
National	Peter Walsh	22,086	75.04	+27.61
Labor	Sharon Garrick	4,802	16.32	−2.19
Greens	Morgana Russell	1,326	4.51	+0.57
Family First	Garion Pearse	1,219	4.14	+0.81
Total formal votes		29,433	95.33	+0.00
Informal votes		1,441	4.67	+0.00
Turnout		30,874	93.35	−0.42
Two-party-preferred result
National	Peter Walsh	23,343	79.33	+5.93
Labor	Sharon Garrick	6,081	20.67	−5.93
National hold		Swing	+5.93	

== See also ==
- Parliaments of the Australian states and territories
- List of members of the Victorian Legislative Assembly
