= Electoral results for the district of Broadmeadows =

Victoria, Australia, district election results

This is a list of electoral results for the Electoral district of Broadmeadows in Victorian state elections.

== Members for Broadmeadows ==
| Member | Party | Term |
|---|---|---|
| Harry Kane | Liberal and Country | 1955–1962 |
| John Wilton | Labor | 1962–1985 |
| Jack Culpin | Labor | 1985–1988 |
| Jim Kennan | Labor | 1988–1993 |
| John Brumby | Labor | 1993–2011 |
| Frank McGuire | Labor | 2011–2022 |
| Kathleen Matthews-Ward | Labor | 2022–present |

== Election results ==
=== Elections in the 2020s ===
2022 Victorian state election: Broadmeadows
| Party | Candidate | Votes | % | ±% |
|---|---|---|---|---|
| Labor | Kathleen Matthews-Ward | 15,899 | 45.7 | −10.8 |
| Liberal | Baris Duzova | 8,044 | 23.1 | +8.0 |
| Greens | Joe Aguilus | 2,908 | 8.4 | +0.5 |
| Victorian Socialists | Omar Hassan | 2,795 | 8.0 | +3.2 |
| Family First | Bienne Tam | 1,611 | 4.6 | +4.6 |
| Independent | Mohamad Elmustapha | 1,316 | 3.8 | +3.8 |
| Animal Justice | Candace Feild | 1,030 | 3.0 | +2.3 |
| Reason | Ben Sutter | 815 | 2.3 | +2.3 |
| Ind. (Socialist Alliance) | Arie Huybregts | 362 | 1.0 | +1.0 |
| Total formal votes | | 34,780 | 89.2 | −1.5 |
| Informal votes | | 4,198 | 10.8 | +1.5 |
| Turnout | | 38,978 | 80.5 | −3.5 |
Two-party-preferred result
| Labor | Kathleen Matthews-Ward | 22,781 | 65.5 | −9.7 |
| Liberal | Baris Duzova | 11,999 | 34.5 | +9.7 |
| Labor hold | | Swing | −9.7 | |

=== Elections in the 2010s ===
2018 Victorian state election: Broadmeadows
| Party | Candidate | Votes | % | ±% |
|---|---|---|---|---|
| Labor | Frank McGuire | 21,784 | 68.3 | +4.1 |
| Liberal | Jenny Dow | 5,257 | 16.5 | −0.7 |
| Greens | Sheriden Tate | 2,581 | 8.1 | +2.5 |
| Victorian Socialists | Jerome Small | 2,270 | 7.1 | +7.1 |
| Total formal votes | | 31,892 | 89.9 | −1.6 |
| Informal votes | | 3,589 | 10.1 | +1.6 |
| Turnout | | 35,481 | 81.3 | −6.8 |
Two-party-preferred result
| Labor | Frank McGuire | 25,876 | 80.3 | +2.5 |
| Liberal | Jenny Dow | 6,353 | 19.7 | −2.5 |
| Labor hold | | Swing | +2.5 | |

2014 Victorian state election: Broadmeadows
| Party | Candidate | Votes | % | ±% |
|---|---|---|---|---|
| Labor | Frank McGuire | 21,584 | 64.2 | +3.4 |
| Liberal | Evren Onder | 5,797 | 17.2 | −8.7 |
| Family First | Wayne Knight | 2,221 | 6.6 | +5.4 |
| Greens | Jaime De Loma-Osorio Ricon | 1,884 | 5.6 | −2.5 |
| Voice for the West | Mohamed Hassan | 1,642 | 4.9 | +4.9 |
| Independent | John Rinaldi | 508 | 1.5 | +1.5 |
| Total formal votes | | 33,636 | 91.5 | −0.8 |
| Informal votes | | 3,133 | 8.5 | +0.8 |
| Turnout | | 36,769 | 88.1 | −2.2 |
Two-party-preferred result
| Labor | Frank McGuire | 26,126 | 77.8 | +7.8 |
| Liberal | Evren Onder | 7,442 | 22.2 | −7.8 |
| Labor hold | | Swing | +7.8 | |

2011 Broadmeadows state by-election
| Party | Candidate | Votes | % | ±% |
|---|---|---|---|---|
| Labor | Frank McGuire | 14,305 | 53.4 | −8.9 |
| Independent | Celal Sahin | 5,396 | 20.2 | +20.2 |
| Greens | Graham Dawson | 1,626 | 6.1 | −1.4 |
| Independent | Graeme Marr | 1,620 | 6.1 | +6.1 |
| Democratic Labor | Mark Hobart | 1,501 | 5.6 | +3.1 |
| Sex Party | Merinda Davis | 1,343 | 5.0 | +5.0 |
| Independent | Peter Byrne | 530 | 2.0 | −0.4 |
| Independent | Joseph Kaliniy | 277 | 1.0 | +1.0 |
| Independent | Gerrit Schorel-Hlavka | 173 | 0.6 | +0.6 |
| Total formal votes | | 26,771 | 90.5 | −1.9 |
| Informal votes | | 2,810 | 9.5 | +1.9 |
| Turnout | | 29,581 | 78.5 | −10.3 |
Two-candidate-preferred result
| Labor | Frank McGuire | 18,704 | 69.9 | −1.1 |
| Independent | Celal Sahin | 8,067 | 30.1 | +30.1 |
| Labor hold | | Swing | −1.1 | |

2010 Victorian state election: Broadmeadows
| Party | Candidate | Votes | % | ±% |
|---|---|---|---|---|
| Labor | John Brumby | 19,125 | 62.29 | −5.35 |
| Liberal | Samli Ozturk | 7,761 | 25.28 | +12.38 |
| Greens | Jaime De Loma-Osorio | 2,304 | 7.50 | +0.90 |
| Democratic Labor | Kevin Butler | 778 | 2.53 | +2.53 |
| Independent | Peter Byrne | 737 | 2.40 | +2.40 |
| Total formal votes | | 30,705 | 92.42 | +0.68 |
| Informal votes | | 2,517 | 7.58 | −0.68 |
| Turnout | | 33,222 | 88.77 | −1.65 |
Two-party-preferred result
| Labor | John Brumby | 21,811 | 70.98 | −10.91 |
| Liberal | Samli Ozturk | 8,919 | 29.02 | +10.91 |
| Labor hold | | Swing | −10.91 | |

=== Elections in the 2000s ===
2006 Victorian state election: Broadmeadows
| Party | Candidate | Votes | % | ±% |
|---|---|---|---|---|
| Labor | John Brumby | 20,600 | 67.64 | −7.86 |
| Liberal | Daniel Parsons | 3,928 | 12.90 | −2.90 |
| Greens | Emily Taylor | 2,010 | 6.60 | +2.10 |
| Family First | Gerard Hines | 1,444 | 4.74 | +4.74 |
| Citizens Electoral Council | Sleirman Yohanna | 1,381 | 4.53 | +1.74 |
| People Power | Marlene Ebejer | 632 | 2.08 | +2.08 |
| Independent | Will Marshall | 459 | 1.51 | +1.51 |
| Total formal votes | | 30,454 | 91.74 | −2.66 |
| Informal votes | | 2,743 | 8.26 | +2.66 |
| Turnout | | 33,197 | 90.42 | +0.21 |
Two-party-preferred result
| Labor | John Brumby | 24,878 | 81.89 | +1.11 |
| Liberal | Daniel Parsons | 5,500 | 18.11 | −1.11 |
| Labor hold | | Swing | +1.11 | |

2002 Victorian state election: Broadmeadows
| Party | Candidate | Votes | % | ±% |
|---|---|---|---|---|
| Labor | John Brumby | 24,060 | 75.5 | +3.5 |
| Liberal | Bentleigh Gibson | 5,035 | 15.8 | −6.0 |
| Greens | Karin Geradts | 1,433 | 4.5 | +4.5 |
| Citizens Electoral Council | Sleirman Yohanna | 888 | 2.8 | +2.8 |
| Independent | Joseph Kaliniy | 453 | 1.4 | +0.6 |
| Total formal votes | | 31,869 | 94.4 | −0.1 |
| Informal votes | | 1,891 | 5.6 | +0.1 |
| Turnout | | 33,760 | 90.2 | |
Two-party-preferred result
| Labor | John Brumby | 25,736 | 80.8 | +5.9 |
| Liberal | Bentleigh Gibson | 6,123 | 19.2 | −5.9 |
| Labor hold | | Swing | +5.9 | |

=== Elections in the 1990s ===
1999 Victorian state election: Broadmeadows
| Party | Candidate | Votes | % | ±% |
|---|---|---|---|---|
| Labor | John Brumby | 22,768 | 71.7 | +0.0 |
| Liberal | Paul Tay | 6,889 | 21.7 | −1.7 |
| Independent | Graeme Marr | 1,022 | 3.2 | +3.2 |
| Independent | Abboud Haidar | 789 | 2.5 | +2.5 |
| Independent | Joseph Kaliniy | 269 | 0.8 | +0.8 |
| Total formal votes | | 31,687 | 94.3 | −2.7 |
| Informal votes | | 1,898 | 5.7 | +2.7 |
| Turnout | | 33,585 | 91.9 | |
Two-party-preferred result
| Labor | John Brumby | 23,651 | 74.7 | −0.4 |
| Liberal | Paul Tay | 8,019 | 25.3 | +0.4 |
| Labor hold | | Swing | −0.4 | |

1996 Victorian state election: Broadmeadows
| Party | Candidate | Votes | % | ±% |
|---|---|---|---|---|
| Labor | John Brumby | 22,249 | 71.7 | +11.9 |
| Liberal | Anthony Fernandez | 7,271 | 23.4 | −3.1 |
| Independent | Sue Phillips | 1,513 | 4.9 | +4.9 |
| Total formal votes | | 31,033 | 97.1 | +2.3 |
| Informal votes | | 942 | 2.9 | −2.3 |
| Turnout | | 31,975 | 92.7 | |
Two-party-preferred result
| Labor | John Brumby | 23,298 | 75.1 | +5.7 |
| Liberal | Anthony Fernandez | 7,712 | 24.9 | −5.7 |
| Labor hold | | Swing | +5.7 | |

1993 Broadmeadows state by-election
| Party | Candidate | Votes | % | ±% |
|---|---|---|---|---|
| Labor | John Brumby | 16,316 | 66.8 | +7.0 |
| Independent | S Rutherford | 4,973 | 20.4 | +20.4 |
| Independent | Sue Phillips | 1,357 | 5.6 | +5.6 |
| Independent | Joseph Kaliniy | 1,129 | 4.6 | +4.6 |
| Independent | B Young | 661 | 2.7 | +2.7 |
| Total formal votes | | 24,436 | 93.6 | −1.1 |
| Informal votes | | 1,667 | 6.4 | +1.1 |
| Turnout | | 26,103 | 81.4 | |
| Labor hold | | Swing | N/A | |

- Preferences were not distributed in this by-election.

1992 Victorian state election: Broadmeadows
| Party | Candidate | Votes | % | ±% |
|---|---|---|---|---|
| Labor | Jim Kennan | 16,380 | 59.8 | +1.8 |
| Liberal | Geoff Lutz | 7,259 | 26.5 | +4.6 |
| Independent | Lynda Blundell | 3,768 | 13.7 | +13.7 |
| Total formal votes | | 27,407 | 94.7 | +0.9 |
| Informal votes | | 1,523 | 5.3 | −0.9 |
| Turnout | | 28,930 | 93.8 | |
Two-party-preferred result
| Labor | Jim Kennan | 18,995 | 69.4 | +6.8 |
| Liberal | Geoff Lutz | 8,369 | 30.6 | −6.8 |
| Labor hold | | Swing | +6.8 | |

=== Elections in the 1980s ===
1988 Victorian state election: Broadmeadows
| Party | Candidate | Votes | % | ±% |
|---|---|---|---|---|
| Labor | Jim Kennan | 12,489 | 55.17 | −14.86 |
| Independent | Jack Culpin | 5,256 | 23.22 | +23.22 |
| Liberal | Carol Lutz | 4,892 | 21.61 | +21.61 |
| Total formal votes | | 22,637 | 93.50 | −1.62 |
| Informal votes | | 1,573 | 6.50 | +1.62 |
| Turnout | | 24,210 | 91.44 | −1.79 |
Two-party-preferred result
| Labor | Jim Kennan | 13,541 | 59.85 | −10.18 |
| Liberal | Carol Lutz | 9,085 | 40.15 | +10.18 |
| Labor hold | | Swing | −10.18 | |

- The two party preferred vote was not counted between the Labor and Independent candidates for Broadmeadows.

1985 Victorian state election: Broadmeadows
| Party | Candidate | Votes | % | ±% |
|---|---|---|---|---|
| Labor | Jack Culpin | 17,301 | 70.0 | −3.8 |
| Liberal | Mark Sinclair | 7,405 | 30.0 | +11.1 |
| Total formal votes | | 24,706 | 95.1 | |
| Informal votes | | 1,268 | 4.9 | |
| Turnout | | 25,974 | 93.2 | |
| Labor hold | | Swing | −6.8 | |

1982 Victorian state election: Broadmeadows
| Party | Candidate | Votes | % | ±% |
|---|---|---|---|---|
| Labor | John Wilton | 26,065 | 74.5 | +6.1 |
| Democrats | Barbara Duncan | 4,496 | 12.9 | −1.6 |
| Liberal | Ross Owen | 4,438 | 12.7 | −4.4 |
| Total formal votes | | 34,999 | 94.4 | +0.4 |
| Informal votes | | 2,093 | 5.6 | −0.4 |
| Turnout | | 37,092 | 94.9 | +1.5 |
Two-party-preferred result
| Labor | John Wilton | 28,650 | 81.9 | +6.3 |
| Liberal | Ross Owen | 6,349 | 18.1 | −6.3 |
| Labor hold | | Swing | +6.3 | |

- The two candidate preferred vote was not counted between the Labor and Democrat candidates for Broadmeadows.

=== Elections in the 1970s ===
1979 Victorian state election: Broadmeadows
| Party | Candidate | Votes | % | ±% |
|---|---|---|---|---|
| Labor | John Wilton | 21,000 | 68.4 | +5.2 |
| Liberal | Norman Walker | 5,255 | 17.1 | −19.7 |
| Democrats | Barbara Duncan | 4,462 | 14.5 | +14.5 |
| Total formal votes | | 30,717 | 94.0 | −1.3 |
| Informal votes | | 1,947 | 6.0 | +1.3 |
| Turnout | | 32,664 | 93.4 | +0.6 |
Two-party-preferred result
| Labor | John Wilton | 23,210 | 75.6 | +12.4 |
| Liberal | Norman Walker | 7,507 | 24.4 | −12.4 |
| Labor hold | | Swing | +12.4 | |

1976 Victorian state election: Broadmeadows
| Party | Candidate | Votes | % | ±% |
|---|---|---|---|---|
| Labor | John Wilton | 16,613 | 63.2 | +3.9 |
| Liberal | Ronald McClelland | 9,663 | 36.8 | +8.5 |
| Total formal votes | | 26,276 | 95.3 | |
| Informal votes | | 1,298 | 4.7 | |
| Turnout | | 27,574 | 92.8 | |
| Labor hold | | Swing | +2.6 | |

1973 Victorian state election: Broadmeadows
| Party | Candidate | Votes | % | ±% |
|---|---|---|---|---|
| Labor | John Wilton | 25,142 | 58.8 | +0.8 |
| Liberal | Claus Salger | 12,004 | 28.1 | +6.2 |
| Democratic Labor | Francis Dowling | 5,638 | 13.2 | −6.9 |
| Total formal votes | | 42,784 | 94.9 | +0.1 |
| Informal votes | | 2,316 | 5.1 | −0.1 |
| Turnout | | 45,100 | 94.7 | −0.9 |
Two-party-preferred result
| Labor | John Wilton | 25,988 | 60.7 | −0.3 |
| Liberal | Claus Salger | 16,796 | 39.3 | +0.3 |
| Labor hold | | Swing | −0.3 | |

1970 Victorian state election: Broadmeadows
| Party | Candidate | Votes | % | ±% |
|---|---|---|---|---|
| Labor | John Wilton | 18,270 | 58.0 | +2.9 |
| Liberal | Howard Thain | 6,884 | 21.9 | −4.5 |
| Democratic Labor | Francis Dowling | 6,332 | 20.1 | +1.6 |
| Total formal votes | | 31,486 | 94.8 | −1.1 |
| Informal votes | | 1,742 | 5.2 | +1.1 |
| Turnout | | 33,228 | 95.6 | +2.4 |
Two-party-preferred result
| Labor | John Wilton | 19,220 | 61.0 | +3.1 |
| Liberal | Howard Thain | 12,266 | 39.0 | −3.1 |
| Labor hold | | Swing | +3.1 | |

=== Elections in the 1960s ===
1967 Victorian state election: Broadmeadows
| Party | Candidate | Votes | % | ±% |
|---|---|---|---|---|
| Labor | John Wilton | 14,087 | 55.1 | −1.0 |
| Liberal | John Blaze | 6,746 | 26.4 | +1.9 |
| Democratic Labor | Francis Dowling | 4,721 | 18.5 | −0.9 |
| Total formal votes | | 25,554 | 95.9 | |
| Informal votes | | 1,091 | 4.1 | |
| Turnout | | 26,645 | 93.2 | |
Two-party-preferred result
| Labor | John Wilton | 14,795 | 57.9 | +0.2 |
| Liberal | John Blaze | 10,759 | 42.1 | −0.2 |
| Labor hold | | Swing | +0.2 | |

1964 Victorian state election: Broadmeadows
| Party | Candidate | Votes | % | ±% |
|---|---|---|---|---|
| Labor | John Wilton | 24,101 | 49.0 | +4.6 |
| Liberal and Country | Francis Robinson | 15,537 | 31.6 | −2.7 |
| Democratic Labor | James Marmion | 9,520 | 19.4 | +0.5 |
| Total formal votes | | 49,158 | 97.5 | 0.0 |
| Informal votes | | 1,026 | 2.5 | 0.0 |
| Turnout | | 50,435 | 95.4 | +0.3 |
Two-party-preferred result
| Labor | John Wilton | 24,856 | 50.6 | +3.6 |
| Liberal and Country | Francis Robinson | 24,302 | 49.4 | −3.6 |
| Labor gain from Liberal and Country | | Swing | +3.6 | |

1962 Broadmeadows state by-election
| Party | Candidate | Votes | % | ±% |
|---|---|---|---|---|
| Labor | John Wilton | 22,700 | 54.3 | +9.9 |
| Liberal and Country | Francis Robinson | 11,737 | 28.1 | −6.3 |
| Democratic Labor | John Donnellon | 7,185 | 17.2 | −1.8 |
| Independent | John Phillips | 217 | 0.5 | +0.5 |
| Total formal votes | | 41,839 | 98.4 | +0.9 |
| Informal votes | | 686 | 1.6 | −0.9 |
| Turnout | | 42,525 | 91.1 | −4.0 |
| Labor gain from Liberal and Country | | Swing | N/A | |

- Preferences were not distributed.

1961 Victorian state election: Broadmeadows
| Party | Candidate | Votes | % | ±% |
|---|---|---|---|---|
| Labor | Joseph Smith | 17,650 | 44.4 | −2.6 |
| Liberal and Country | Harry Kane | 13,651 | 34.3 | −2.9 |
| Democratic Labor | John Donnellon | 7,529 | 18.9 | +3.1 |
| Independent | Anthony van der Loo | 908 | 2.3 | +2.3 |
| Total formal votes | | 39,738 | 97.5 | −1.1 |
| Informal votes | | 1,026 | 2.5 | +1.1 |
| Turnout | | 40,764 | 95.1 | +1.0 |
Two-party-preferred result
| Liberal and Country | Harry Kane | 21,076 | 53.0 | +2.2 |
| Labor | Joseph Smith | 18,662 | 47.0 | −2.2 |
| Liberal and Country hold | | Swing | +2.2 | |

=== Elections in the 1950s ===
1958 Victorian state election: Broadmeadows
| Party | Candidate | Votes | % | ±% |
|---|---|---|---|---|
| Labor | Joseph Smith | 13,279 | 47.0 | |
| Liberal and Country | Harry Kane | 10,504 | 37.2 | |
| Democratic Labor | John Donnellon | 4,455 | 15.8 | |
| Total formal votes | | 28,238 | 98.6 | |
| Informal votes | | 399 | 1.4 | |
| Turnout | | 28,637 | 94.1 | |
Two-party-preferred result
| Liberal and Country | Harry Kane | 14,335 | 50.8 | |
| Labor | Joseph Smith | 13,903 | 49.2 | |
| Liberal and Country hold | | Swing | | |

1955 Victorian state election: Broadmeadows
| Party | Candidate | Votes | % | ±% |
|---|---|---|---|---|
| Labor | Joseph Smith | 11,043 | 42.9 | |
| Liberal and Country | Harry Kane | 9,572 | 37.1 | |
| Country | James Webster | 5,156 | 20.0 | |
| Total formal votes | | 25,771 | 98.5 | |
| Informal votes | | 394 | 1.5 | |
| Turnout | | 26,165 | 94.0 | |
Two-party-preferred result
| Liberal and Country | Harry Kane | 13,485 | 52.3 | |
| Labor | Joseph Smith | 12,286 | 47.7 | |
| Liberal and Country gain from Labor | | Swing | | |
