= List of elections in 1993 =

The following elections occurred in the year 1993.

== Africa ==
- 1993 Burundian legislative election
- 1993 Burundian presidential election
- 1993 Central African Republic general election
- 1993 Comorian legislative election
- 1993 Republic of the Congo parliamentary election
- 1993 Djiboutian presidential election
- 1993 Equatorial Guinean legislative election
- 1993 Gabonese presidential election
- 1993 Guinean presidential election
- 1993 Lesotho general election
- 1993 Malagasy parliamentary election
- 1992–1993 Malagasy presidential election
- 1993 Moroccan parliamentary election
- 1993 Nigerian presidential election
- 1993 Nigerien parliamentary election
- 1993 Nigerien presidential election
- 1993 Senegalese parliamentary election
- 1993 Senegalese presidential election
- 1993 Seychellois general election
- 1993 Swazi general election
- 1993 Togolese presidential election

== Asia ==
- 1993 Autonomous Region in Muslim Mindanao general election
- 1993 Azerbaijani presidential election
- 1993 Balochistan Provincial Assembly election
- 1993 Cypriot presidential election
- 1993 Iranian presidential election
- 1993 Israeli municipal elections
- 1993 Israeli presidential election
- 1993 Jordanian general election
- 1993 Maldivian presidential election
- 1993 Mongolian presidential election
- 1993 North Korean local elections
- 1993 Pakistani general election
- 1993 Pakistani presidential election
- 1993 Singaporean presidential election
- 1993 Yemeni parliamentary election
- 1993 Cambodian general election
- 1993 Japanese general election
- 1993 Sri Lankan presidential election
- 1993 Turkish presidential election

== Europe ==
- 1993 Andorran parliamentary election
- 1993 Azerbaijani presidential election
- 1993 Croatian Chamber of Counties election
- 1993 Croatian local elections
- 1993 Czech presidential election
- 1993 Danish local elections
- 1993 Greek legislative election
- 1993 Jersey general election
- 1993 Italian local elections
- 1993 Latvian parliamentary election
- 1993 Latvian presidential election
- February 1993 Liechtenstein general election
- October 1993 Liechtenstein general election
- 1993 Lithuanian presidential election
- 1993 Monegasque general election
- 1992–93 Montenegrin general election
- 1993 Northern Cypriot parliamentary election
- 1993 Norwegian parliamentary election
- 1993 Polish parliamentary election
- 1993 Portuguese local election
- 1993 San Marino general election
- 1993 Serbian parliamentary election
- 1993 Slovak presidential election
- 1993 Spanish general election
- 1993 Turkish presidential election

=== France ===
- 1993 French legislative election

=== Germany ===
- 1993 Hamburg state election

=== Russia ===
- 1993 Russian constitutional referendum
- 1993 Russian government referendum
- 1993 Russian legislative election

=== United Kingdom ===
- 1993 Christchurch by-election
- 1993 Northern Ireland local elections
- 1993 Millwall by-election
- 1993 Newbury by-election

==== United Kingdom local ====
- 1993 United Kingdom local elections

== North America ==
- 1993 Aruban general election
- 1993 Belizean legislative election
- 1993–1994 Belizean municipal elections
- 1993 Guatemalan presidential election
- 1993 Honduran general election

=== Canada ===
- 1993 Canadian federal election
- 1993 Alberta general election
- 1993 Newfoundland general election
- 1993 Nova Scotia general election
- 1993 Prince Edward Island general election

=== Caribbean ===
- 1993 Aruban general election
- 1993 Bermudian general election
- 1993 Cuban parliamentary election
- 1993 Jamaican general election
- 1993 Saint Kitts and Nevis general election

=== United States ===
- 1993 United States elections

==== United States lieutenant gubernatorial ====
- 1993 Arkansas lieutenant gubernatorial special election
- 1993 Virginia lieutenant gubernatorial election

==== United States gubernatorial ====
- 1993 New Jersey gubernatorial election
- 1993 Virginia gubernatorial election
- 1993 United States gubernatorial elections

==== United States House of Representatives ====
- 1993 United States House of Representatives elections
- 1993 California's 17th congressional district special election
- 1993 Michigan's 3rd congressional district special election
- 1993 Mississippi's 2nd congressional district special election
- 1993 Ohio's 2nd congressional district special election
- 1993 Wisconsin's 1st congressional district special election

==== United States Senate ====
- 1993 United States Senate elections
- 1993 United States Senate special election in Texas

==== United States mayoral elections ====
- 1993 Allentown mayoral election
- 1993 Atlanta mayoral election
- 1993 Boston mayoral election
- 1993 Buffalo mayoral election
- 1993 Burlington mayoral election
- 1993 Cleveland mayoral election
- 1993 Houston mayoral election
- 1993 Los Angeles mayoral election
- 1993 Manchester, New Hampshire, mayoral election
- 1993 New York City mayoral election
- 1993 Pittsburgh mayoral election
- 1993 St. Louis mayoral election
- 1993 Springfield, Massachusetts, mayoral election
- 1993 Toledo, Ohio mayoral election
- 1993 Worcester, Massachusetts mayoral election

== Oceania ==
- 1993 Micronesian general election
- 1993 New Zealand general election
- 1993 Niuean general election
- 1993 Solomon Islands general election
- 1993 Tauranga by-election
- 1993 Tongan general election
- September 1993 Tuvaluan general election
- November 1993 Tuvaluan general election

=== Australia ===
- 1993 Australian federal election
- 1993 Broadmeadows state by-election
- 1993 South Australian state election
- 1993 The Hills state by-election
- 1993 Western Australian state election

== South America ==
- 1993 Argentine legislative election
- 1993 Bolivian general election
- 1993 Chilean presidential election
- 1993 Falkland Islands general election
- 1993 Paraguayan general election
- 1993 Venezuelan general election
