= Electoral results for the district of Glenroy =

Victoria, Australia, district election results

This is a list of electoral results for the electoral district of Glenroy in Victorian state elections.

== Members for Glenroy ==
Member	Party	Term
Jack Culpin	Labor	1976–1985

== Election results ==
=== Elections in the 1980s ===
1982 Victorian state election: Glenroy
Party	Candidate	Votes	%	±%
Labor	Jack Culpin	18,118	71.2	+4.5
Liberal	Donald Roberts	7,314	28.8	−4.5
Total formal votes		24,363	95.8	−0.3
Informal votes		1,027	3.9	+0.3
Turnout		25,432	90.7	−3.7
Labor hold		Swing	+4.5	

=== Elections in the 1970s ===
1979 Victorian state election: Glenroy
Party	Candidate	Votes	%	±%
Labor	Jack Culpin	16,695	66.7	+7.8
Liberal	Donald McClelland	8,338	33.3	−7.8
Total formal votes		25,033	96.1	−0.2
Informal votes		1,027	3.9	+0.2
Turnout		26,060	94.4	+0.5
Labor hold		Swing	+7.8	

1976 Victorian state election: Glenroy
Party	Candidate	Votes	%	±%
Labor	Jack Culpin	14,804	58.9	+2.9
Liberal	Francis Mott	10,319	41.1	+10.4
Total formal votes		25,123	96.3	
Informal votes		970	3.7	
Turnout		26,093	93.9	
Labor hold		Swing	0.0	
