= 1993 Israeli municipal elections =

Local elections in several municipalities and councils in Israel

Municipal elections took place in Israel on 2 November 1993. They were the first in which Meretz and United Torah Judaism, who were founded after the previous round of municipal elections, stood candidates.

== Elections by Municipality ==
In Jerusalem, Incumbent Mayor Teddy Kollek had served as the city's mayor for 28 years. Kollek initially decided not to seek re-election due to his age. following political pressures, Kollek decided to seek re-election, facing Member of the Knesset and former Minister of Health Ehud Olmert. Meir Porush, who initially ran as a Haredi interests candidate, dropped out and endorsed Olmert. on election day, Haredi turnout was high, while Arab and Hiloni turnout was low. as a result, Olmert won the election with around 59% of the vote, against Kollek's 35%. In the City Council, the biggest list was United Torah Judaism with 7 seats, followed by Kollek's 'One Jerusalem' list with 6, Olmert's "United Jerusalem" with 5, Meretz-Greens with 4, Shas and Tzomet with 2, and Yehoram Gaon's list with one. after the election, Olmert established a coalition with United Torah Judaism, Shas, and Tzomet.

In Tel Aviv, candidate of the 'Lev' list Roni Milo defeated Labor candidate Avigdor Kahalani. In the City Council, Labor was the biggest party with 10 seats, Likud the second biggest with 6, 'Lev' with 5, Meretz and the Religious Front with 3 each, the 'I Care' list with 2, and Eliyahu Aminot's list, as well as the 'For Jaffa' list with 1 seat each. after the election Kahalani worked with Milo and served as his deputy.

In Haifa, Labor candidate Amram Mitzna won with about 56% of the vote. In the City Council, Labor won 13 seats, Likud won 5, the Youth List won 4, Meretz won 3, the List for Peace and the Religious List won 2 seats each, and the Torah List and Tzomet with one seat each.

In Beersheba, incumbent Mayor Yitzhak Rager was re-elected. In the City Council, "Capital of the Negev", led by Rager, won 5 Seats, "Our Beersheba" won 4, Labor won 3, Shas and United Torah Judaism won 2 seats each, "Path of the South" and "Eshel" won 2 seats each, while "Rise", Mafdal, and Meretz won 1 seat each. Tzomet did not cross the City Council's electoral threshold.

In Rishon LeZion, incumbent mayor Meir Nitzan was re-elected. he faced several candidates, including David Bitan, who ran as the candidate of the Likud, and won less than 7% of the vote. In the City Council, Labor won 8 seats, Likud won 6, Shas, "Lev" and the Religious Front won 2 seats, and Tzomet, One Rishon and the Waking Up Movement won 1 seat each.

In Ramat Gan, incumbent Mayor Zvi Bar was re-elected. his list, "Ramat Gan in the Lead", won 8 seats in the City Council. Labor won 6, the Likud won 4, Mafdal and Meretz won 2, and the Religious List, the Movement for the City and Tzomet won 1 seat each.

In Holon, incumbent Mayor Moshe Rom, a member of the Likud, was defeated by Labor candidate Moti Sasson, winning by a 4% vote margin. In the City Council, Labor won 11 seats, Likud won 6, Shas and Tzomet won 2 seats each, and Meretz, "Zehavi", the Religious List and "Alomg" won 1 seat each.

In Lod, Maxim Levy was elected mayor. in the City Council, 'One Lod', led by Levy, won 7 seats. "Unity" won 3 seats, Loyalists of Lod, The Arab List and "Together" won 2 seats each, and the Shas-Mafdal list won 1 seat.

In Ramla, Migdal HaEmek and Afula, incumbent Likud Mayors Yoel Lavi, Shaul Amor and Tzadok Nawi were re-elected.

In Kiryat Bialik, Incumbent Mayor Denni Jacque was re-elected with around half of the vote.

In Kiryat Shmona, incumbent Mayor Prosper Azran was re-elected.

In Arad, incumbent Head of the Council Bezalel Tabib was re-elected. His party won 8 seats in the Local Council, Likud won 4 seats, "Together" won 2 seats and Meretz won one seat.

In Gedera, Likud candidate Eliyahu Radia was elected in the second round. In Shlomi, Likud candidate Israel Okrat was elected.

In Ofakim, Local Candidate Michael Hermann defeated Likud-Mafdal candidate Yair Ashraf.

In Mitzpe Ramon, Labor-Meretz candidate Shmuel Shoshan was elected in the second round. His party won 4 seats in the Local Council, as did the "Matzpaim" list. The Likud won 3 seats.

Maccabim Re'ut held elections for a Local Council for the first time, which were won by Moshe Spector, who won around 57% of the vote and whose party won 5 out of 11 seats on the council.

In Kfar Shmaryahu, Shraga Milstein was elected unopposed.

In Azor, incumbent Head of the Council Amnon Zach was elected as a candidate of the Labor-Meretz list.

In Omer, incumbent Head of the Council Pini Badash was re-elected.

In Bu'eine Nujeidat, the candidate of the Labor PAarty was elected.

In Ghajar and Ramot HaShavim, no elections were held, as there was only one candidate for the Leadership of the council and only one list seeking election to the Local Council. in Isfiya, several lists ran in elections for the Local Council, but Labor's candidate for Head of the council was elected unopposed.
