= 1993 Broadmeadows state by-election =

By-election in the Victorian Legislative Assembly

- 18 September 1993

Electoral district of Broadmeadows in the Victorian Legislative Assembly
- Registered: 32,055
- Turnout: 81.4% (▼12.4)
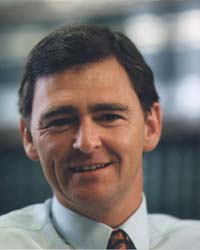
	First party	Second party
		IND
Candidate	John Brumby	Sonja Rutherford
Party	Labor	Independent
Popular vote	16,316	4,973
Percentage	66.8%	20.4%
Swing	▲7.0	▲20.4
MP before election
Jim Kennan
Labor
Elected MP
John Brumby
Labor

The 1993 Boardmeadows state by-election was held on 18 September 1993 to elect the next member for Boardmeadows in the Victorian Legislative Assembly, following the resignation of incumbent MP and opposition leader Jim Kennan on 29 June 1993.

The seat was retained for the Labor Party by candidate John Brumby. Ten days after the by-election, he was appointed Leader of the Opposition and subsequently served as Premier of Victoria from 2007 to 2010.

== Candidates ==
Candidates are listed in ballot paper order. The Liberal Party, which received 26.5% of first preference votes in Broadmeadows at the 1992 state election, did not contest the by-election.

Party	Candidate	Background
Labor	John Brumby	MLC for Doutta Galla (1993), Federal MP for Bendigo (1983–1990)
Independent	Sue Phillips	Independent candidate for Clayton at the 1992 state election
Independent	Sonja Rutherford	
Independent	Brian Young	
Independent	Joseph Kaliniy	

== Results ==
1993 Broadmeadows state by-election
Party	Candidate	Votes	%	±%
Labor	John Brumby	16,316	66.8	+7.0
Independent	Sonja Rutherford	4,973	20.4	+20.4
Independent	Sue Phillips	1,357	5.6	+5.6
Independent	Joseph Kaliniy	1,129	4.6	+4.6
Independent	Brian Young	661	2.7	+2.7
Total formal votes		24,436	93.6	−1.1
Informal votes		1,667	6.4	+1.1
Turnout		26,103	81.4	
Labor hold				

== See also ==
- List of Victorian state by-elections
