= Electoral district of Broadmeadows =

State electoral district of Victoria, Australia

Broadmeadows Victoria—Legislative Assembly
- Interactive map of electoral district boundaries from the 2022 state election
- State: Victoria
- Created: 1955
- MP: Kathleen Matthews-Ward
- Party: Labor Party
- Namesake: Broadmeadows, Victoria
- Electors: 43,657 (2018)
- Area: 47 km^{2} (18.1 sq mi)
- Demographic: Metropolitan

The electoral district of Broadmeadows is an electorate of the Victorian Legislative Assembly. It covers an area of 47 square kilometres (18 sq mi) in outer northern Melbourne, and includes the suburbs of Broadmeadows, Campbellfield, Coolaroo, Dallas, Fawkner, Glenroy, Hadfield, Jacana and Oak Park. It lies within the Northern Metropolitan Region of the upper house, the Legislative Council.

The seat was created in 1955, and though it was initially won by Liberal and Country member Harry Kane, has been a safe Labor seat for most of its history. Kane held the seat until his death in 1962, and was succeeded by Labor backbenchers John Wilton (1962–1985) and Jack Culpin (1985–1988).

In 1988 Culpin, a former member for abolished Glenroy, lost Labor preselection for Broadmeadows for that year's election to Jim Kennan, member of the Legislative Council and then Minister for Transport, who was attempting to switch to the Legislative Assembly. Culpin resigned from the Labor Party and contested Broadmeadows as an independent, but was defeated by Kennan at the election. Kennan served as Deputy Premier under Joan Kirner from 1990 to 1992, and succeeded Kirner as Leader of the Opposition from March to June 1993.

Kennan resigned as Opposition Leader and from parliament in June 1993, and was succeeded in Broadmeadows at the resulting by-election by John Brumby, a member of the Legislative Council and former federal MP, who like Kennan sought to switch to the Legislative Assembly. Brumby later served as Opposition Leader from 1993 to 1999, and Premier of Victoria from 2007 to 2010. He resigned from parliament in 2011, and was succeeded as member of Broadmeadows at the resulting by-election by Frank McGuire, journalist, business consultant and brother of broadcaster Eddie McGuire.

The 2021 Victorian federal redistribution saw the electorate gain Hadfield, Oak Park and the remainder of Glenroy from the electoral district of Pascoe Vale, and lose Meadow Heights and the remainder of Roxburgh Park, Somerton, and Westmeadows to the new electoral district of Greenvale.

== Members for Broadmeadows ==
Member	Party	Term
Harry Kane	Liberal and Country	1955–1962
John Wilton	Labor	1962–1985
Jack Culpin	Labor	1985–1988
Jack Culpin	Independent	1988
Jim Kennan	Labor	1988–1993
John Brumby	Labor	1993–2010
Frank McGuire	Labor	2011–2022
Kathleen Matthews-Ward	Labor	2022–present

== Election results ==
2022 Victorian state election: Broadmeadows
Party	Candidate	Votes	%	±%
Labor	Kathleen Matthews-Ward	15,899	45.7	−10.8
Liberal	Baris Duzova	8,044	23.1	+8.0
Greens	Joe Aguilus	2,908	8.4	+0.5
Victorian Socialists	Omar Hassan	2,795	8.0	+3.2
Family First	Bienne Tam	1,611	4.6	+4.6
Independent	Mohamad Elmustapha	1,316	3.8	+3.8
Animal Justice	Candace Feild	1,030	3.0	+2.3
Reason	Ben Sutter	815	2.3	+2.3
Ind. (Socialist Alliance)	Arie Huybregts	362	1.0	+1.0
Total formal votes		34,780	89.2	−1.5
Informal votes		4,198	10.8	+1.5
Turnout		38,978	80.5	−3.5
Two-party-preferred result
Labor	Kathleen Matthews-Ward	22,781	65.5	−9.7
Liberal	Baris Duzova	11,999	34.5	+9.7
Labor hold		Swing	−9.7	

Two-candidate-preferred vote results in Broadmeadows View source data.
