= Kathleen Matthews-Ward =

Australian politician

Kathleen Matthews-Ward MP
- Matthews-Ward in 2026

Member of the Victorian Legislative Assembly for Broadmeadows
- Incumbent
- Assumed office 26 November 2022
- Preceded by: Frank McGuire

Councillor of the City of Moreland for North-East Ward
- In office 26 November 2004 – 27 October 2012
- Preceded by: New ward
- Succeeded by: Helen Davidson

Personal details
- Party: Labor (since 1994)
- Other political affiliations: Independent (2010 to 2012)

Kathleen Matthews-Ward is an Australian politician who is the current member for the district of Broadmeadows in the Victorian Legislative Assembly. She is a member of the Labor Party and was elected in the 2022 state election, replacing retiring MP Frank McGuire.

== Career ==
Prior to entering parliament, she had worked in retail, hospitality, finance, advocacy and aged care, she had volunteered with many sports clubs, schools, kinders and local organisations, and served as a councillor on City of Moreland from 2004 until 2012. In May 2010, she was suspended from Labor for two years after not voting for another Labor member—Enver Erdogan—to become mayor of Merri-bek.

Victorian Legislative Assembly
Preceded by Frank McGuire	Member for Broadmeadows; 2022–present	Incumbent
