= 1993 Micronesian general election =

1993 Micronesian parliamentary election
- 2 March 1993

10 out of 14 seats in Congress

Parliamentary elections were held in the Federated States of Micronesia on 2 March 1993. All candidates for seats in Congress ran as independents.

== Results ==
Party	Votes	%	Seats
Independents		100	14
Invalid/blank votes		-	-
Total		100	14
Source: IPU
