= 2011 Broadmeadows state by-election =

Victorian Legislative Assembly by-election

A by-election for the Victorian Legislative Assembly district of Broadmeadows was conducted on 19 February 2011, and was retained by the Labor Party.

The by-election was triggered by the resignation on 21 December 2010 of John Brumby, the former Premier of Victoria whose 11-year incumbent Labor government was defeated at the 2010 election. Writs for the by-election were issued on 20 January 2011.

== Background ==
Primary votes in Broadmeadows at the 2010 election saw Labor win 62.3 percent and the Liberals win 25.3 percent, with a 71 percent two-party Labor vote. Being Labor's safest seat at that election, the Liberals chose not to contest the by-election. Labor chose to stand Frank McGuire, brother of Eddie McGuire as their candidate. Nine candidates stood at the by-election, with McGuire predicted to win.

== Results ==
Labor won the seat with a majority of primary votes alone. Turkish independent Celal Sahin made a show with a fifth of the primary vote and 30 percent of the two-candidate-preferred vote.

Broadmeadows state by-election, 2011
Party	Candidate	Votes	%	±%
Labor	Frank McGuire	14,305	53.4	–8.9
Independent	Celal Sahin	5,396	20.2	+20.2
Greens	Graham Dawson	1,626	6.1	–1.4
Independent	Graeme Marr	1,620	6.1	+6.1
Democratic Labor	Mark Hobart	1,501	5.6	+3.1
Sex Party	Merinda Davis	1,343	5.0	+5.0
Independent	Peter Byrne	530	2.0	–0.4
Independent	Joseph Kaliniy	277	1.0	+1.0
Independent	Gerrit Schorel-Hlavka	173	0.6	+0.6
Total formal votes		26,771	90.5	–1.9
Informal votes		2,810	9.5	+1.9
Turnout		29,581	78.5	–10.3
Two-candidate-preferred result
Labor	Frank McGuire	18,704	69.9	–1.1
Independent	Celal Sahin	8,067	30.1	+30.1
Labor hold		Swing	N/A	
