= Harry Kane (politician) =

Australian politician (1903–1962)

Harold Edward Kane (5 July 1903 – 30 May 1962) was an Australian politician.

He was born in Wangaratta to estate agent Daniel Kane and Martha Hannah Williams. He attended Essendon High School and worked for the Victorian Primary Producers Co-operative Society until around 1933, when he became a farmer at Diggers Rest and then Gisborne. On 16 December 1934, he married Beryl Irma Sanders, with whom he had three sons. He inherited his father's estate agency, and also served on Broadmeadows Shire Council from 1939 to 1946 (as president from 1945 to 1946). In 1955, he was elected to the Victorian Legislative Assembly as the Liberal and Country Party member for Broadmeadows. He served until his death at Essendon in 1962.

Victorian Legislative Assembly
New seat	Member for Broadmeadows; 1955–1962	Succeeded by John Wilton
