= Yoel Lavi =

Israeli mayor of Ramla

- יואל לביא
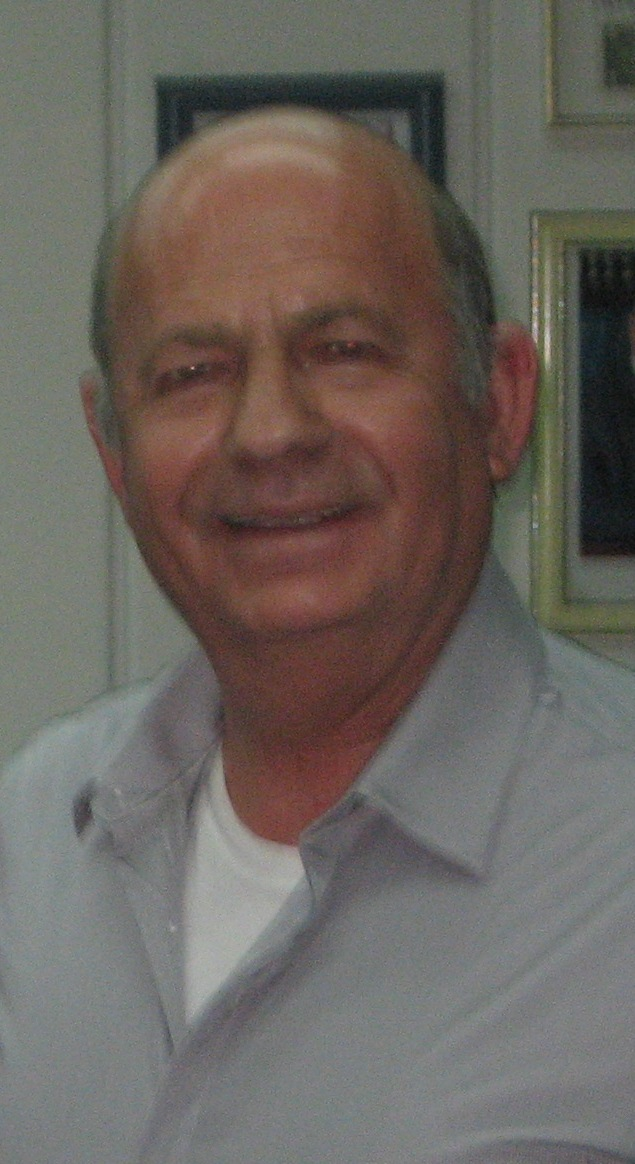

mayor of Ramla
- In office 1993–2017

Personal details
- Born: 8 February 1950
- Party: Kadima

Yoel Lavi (Hebrew: יואל לביא; born 8 February 1950) is an Israeli politician who was the mayor of Ramla in Israel.

Lavi was a member of Kadima, he was 114th on the party's list for the 2009 Knesset elections. He holds a B.Sc. degree in History from the Tel Aviv University and an M.A degree in Mathematics and Social Sciences, from the University of Haifa.
