= John Wilton (Australian politician) =

Australian politician

John Wilton OAM (31 January 1925 – 13 October 2002) was the member for Broadmeadows in the Victorian Legislative Assembly from 1962 to 1985. He was a member of the Labor Party.

Wilton was born in Penguin, Tasmania and was a member of the Second Australian Imperial Force 1942–1947, S.W. Pacific, Japan. He lived in Niddrie, Victoria from 1949; engine driver, first class, 1949–1956, Federated Engine Drivers' and Firemen's Association shop steward Newport Powerhouse; self-employed carrier 1956–1962. He was a member of Niddrie High School, Broadmeadows, Glenroy and Fawkner Technical College Councils, Niddrie State School committee, Airport West Progress Association; trustee Broadmeadows Hospital, Fawkner-Campbellfield Community Health Centre; founding member Victorian Vocational and Rehabilitation Centre 1971, chairman for 24 years; delegate to Constitutional Conventions. OAM June 1987. Keilor shire councillor 1958–1960.

Victorian Legislative Assembly
Previous: Harry Kane	Member for Broadmeadows; 1962–1985	Succeeded by Jack Culpin
