= 1993 United States House of Representatives elections =

1993 U.S. House of Representatives elections
- April 13th - December 7, 1993

5 (out of 435) seats in the U.S. House of Representatives 218 seats needed for a majority
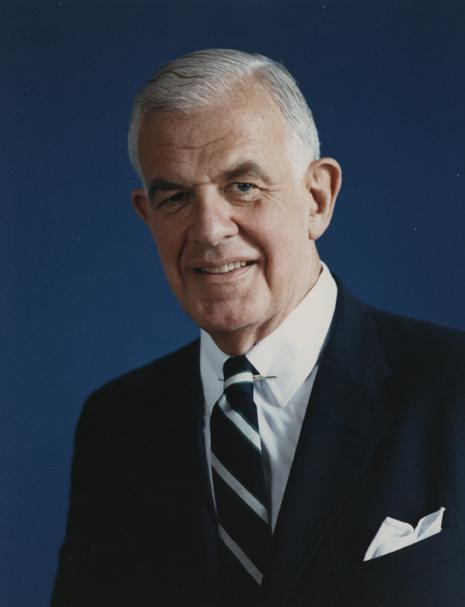

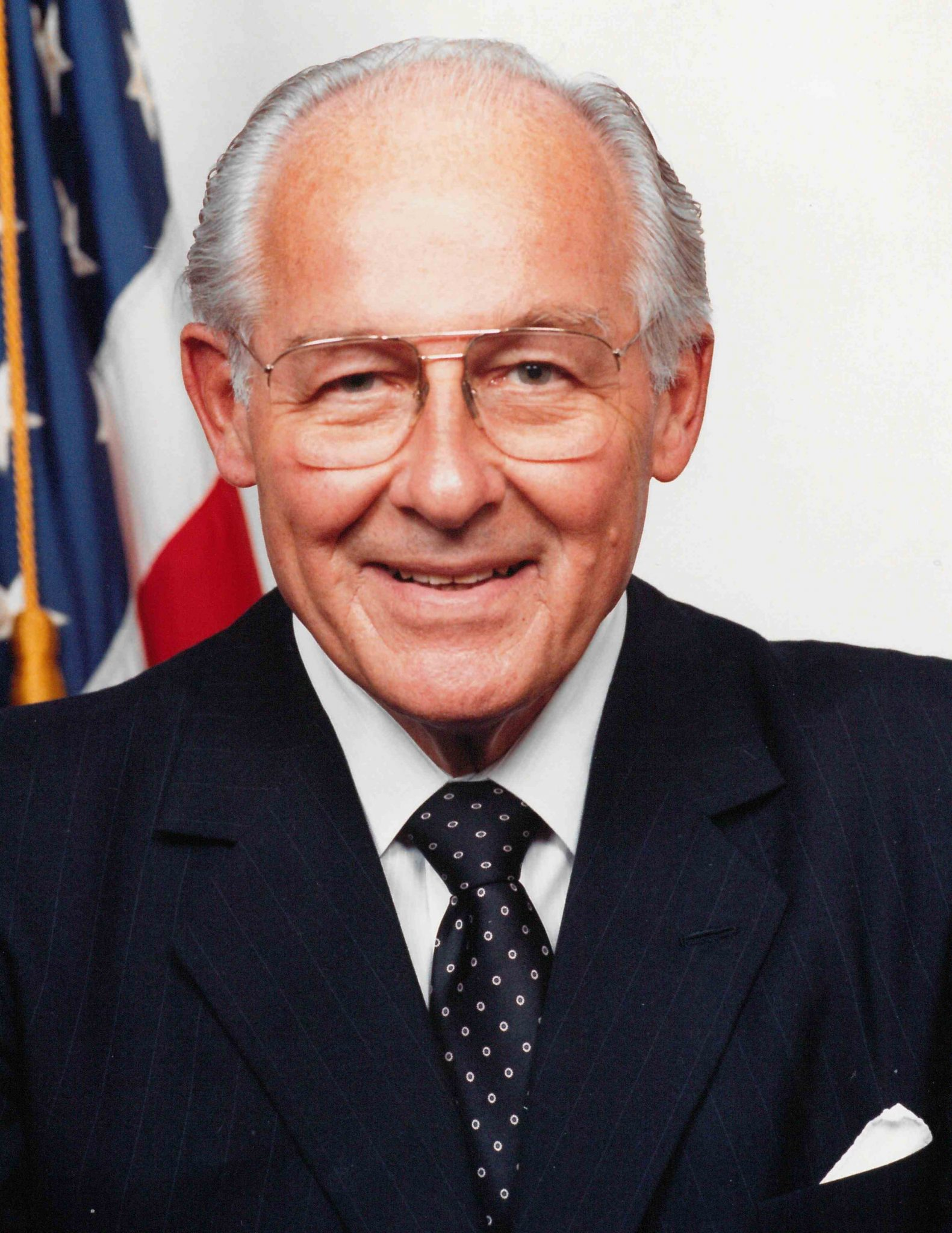
	Majority party	Minority party
Leader	Tom Foley	Bob Michel
Party	Democratic	Republican
Leader since	June 6, 1989	January 3, 1981
Leader's seat	Washington 5th	Illinois 18th
Last election	258 seats	176 seats
Seats won	258	176
Seat change	Steady	Steady

There were five special elections to the United States House of Representatives in 1993, during 103rd United States Congress.

== List of elections ==
Elections are listed by date and district.

District	Incumbent			This race	
District	Member	Party	First elected	Results	Candidates
Wisconsin 1	Les Aspin	Democratic	1970	Incumbent resigned January 20, 1993, to become U.S. Secretary of Defense. New member elected May 4, 1993. Democratic hold.	▌ ✓ Peter W. Barca (Democratic) 49.90%; ▌Mark Neumann (Republican) 49.29%; Others: ▌Edward J. Kozak (Libertarian) 0.34%; ▌Gary W. Thompson (Independent) 0.29%; ▌Karl Huebner (Independent) 0.18%
Mississippi 2	Mike Espy	Democratic	1986	Incumbent resigned January 22, 1993, to become U.S. Secretary of Agriculture. New member elected April 13, 1993. Democratic hold.	▌ ✓ Bennie Thompson (Democratic) 55.16%; ▌Hayes Dent (Republican) 44.84%
California 17	Leon Panetta	Democratic	1976	Incumbent resigned January 23, 1993, to become Director of the Office of Management and Budget. New member elected June 8, 1993. Democratic hold.	▌ ✓ Sam Farr (Democratic) 25.77%; ▌William W. Monning (Democratic) 18.62%; ▌Barbara Shipnuk (Democratic) 14.18%; ▌Bill McCampbell (Republican) 11.92%; ▌Jess Brown (Republican) 10.22%; ▌Bob Ernst (Republican) 5.60%; ▌Martin Vonnegut (Democratic) 3.26%; Others: ▌Barbara Honegger (Republican) 2.03%; ▌Lancelot C. McClair (Democratic) 1.54%}; ▌Richard J. Quigley (Libertarian) 0.45%; ▌Kevin G. Clark (Green) 0.35%; ▌Jerome "Jerry" McCready (American Independent) 0.32%; ▌Peter James (Independent) 0.18%; ▌James "Jimmy" Ogle (Independent) 0.13%
Ohio 2	Bill Gradison	Republican	1974	Incumbent resigned January 31, 1993, to become president of the Health Insurance Association of America. New member elected May 4, 1993. Republican hold.	▌ ✓ Rob Portman (Republican) 70.07%; ▌Lee Hornberger (Democratic) 29.93%
Michigan 3	Paul B. Henry	Republican	1984	Incumbent died July 31, 1993. New member elected December 7, 1993. Republican hold.	▌ ✓ Vern Ehlers (Republican) 66.62%; ▌Dale Robert Sprik (Democratic) 23.17%; ▌Dawn I. Krupp (Independent) 10.15%; ▌Write-ins 0.06%
