= 1989 Israeli municipal elections =

Local elections in several municipalities and councils in Israel

Municipal elections took place in Israel on 28 February 1989. They were originally meant to take place on 1 November 1988, but were delayed due to legislative elections taking place that day.

== Elections By Municipality ==
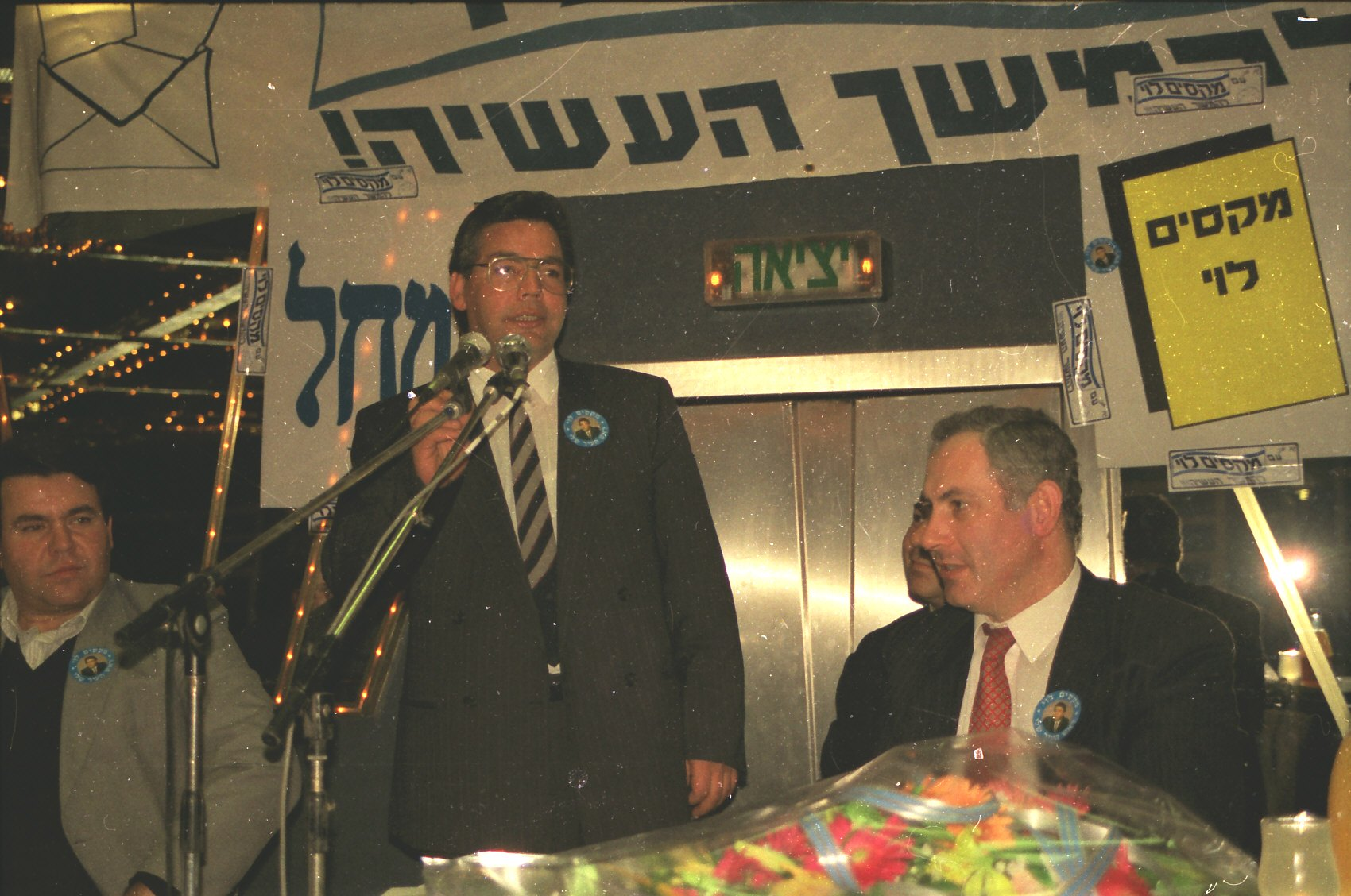
Mayor of Lod Maxim Levy and Deputy Minister of Foreign Affairs Benjamin Netanyahu at an election rally

In Jerusalem, incumbent Mayor Teddy Kollek was re-elected with 58.8% of the vote. Kollek's list won 11 seats in the City Council, the Ratz-Shinui list and the Likud list won 4 seats each, Degel HaTorah, Shas and Agudat Yisrael won 3 seats each, and Emuna won one seat.

In Tel Aviv, incumbent Likud Mayor Shlomo Lahat won re-electiom, defeating six candidates including Labor candidate Natan Woloch. Lahat won around 55% of the vote, while Woloch received around 19%. In the City Council, Likud won 12 seats, Labor won 8, the Religious List won 4, Ratz won 3, and Mapam, "There is only one Tel Aviv", Shinui and the Liberal Party won one seat each.

In Haifa, incumbent Alignment Mayor Aryeh Gur'el was re-elected with 42% of the vote, defeating Likud candidate Rami Dotan, who won 38% of the vote. in the City Council, Gurel's list won 10 seats, the Likud won 8, Shinui won 3, Ratz and the Religious front won 2 seats each, and Hadash and the Youth List won 1 seat each.

In Beersheba, Likud candidate Yitzhak Rager was elected Mayor with around 60% of the vote. In the City Council, Labor won 6 seats, Shas and "Traction for Beersheba" won 2 seats each, Ratz, a Future for Beersheba and Mafdal won 1 seat each, and Tehiya, Moledet and Shinui failed to cross the City Council's electoral threshold.

In Karmiel, 3 candidates ran for Mayor: Giora Rozental of the Independent List for Karmiel, Amos Ozani of the Likud and Adi Adler of the Alignment. Adler ultimately defeated Ozani in the second round.

In Netanya, incumbent Likud Mayor Yoel Alroy was re-elected with around 65% of the vote.

In Herzliya, incumbent Likud Mayor Eli Landau was re-elected with around two thirds of the vote. In the City Council, the Likud won 10 seats, Labor won 6, the Ratz-Shinui list won 2 and Mafdal-Shas won one.

In Holon, Likud candidate Moshe Rom defeated incumbent Alignment Mayor Haim Sharon. The Likud and the Alignment tied in the City Council, winning 9 seats each, "Oz" won 4, while Mafdal, Zehavi and Shas-Agudat Yisrael won one seat each.

In Givatayim, incumbent Alignment Mayor Yitzhak Yaron defeated Likud candidate Michael Rihuk, winning around 72% of the vote to Rihuk's 28%

In Rosh HaAyin, Likud candidate Yigal Yosef was elected.

In Tiberias, Likud candidate Yosef Peretz defeated incumbent Mafdal Mayor Yigal Bibi in the first round. In the City Council, the Likud won 5 seats, Shas 3, "For the Promotion of Tiberias", "Loyalists of Liberty", Mafdal and the Alignment won 2 seats each, the Target list won 1 seat and Mapam did not cross the City Council's electoral threshold.

In Arad, Alignment candidate and incumbent deputy Mayor Bezalel Tabib was elected.

In Azor, Alignment candidate Amnon Zakh was elected.

Kokhav Ya'ir held elections for the first time, which were won by David Rosh.

In Lod, incumbent Likud Mayor Maxim Levy was re-elected.
