= Frank McGuire (politician) =

Australian politician

Frank McGuire MP

Member of the Victorian Parliament for Broadmeadows
- In office 19 February 2011 – 26 November 2022
- Preceded by: John Brumby
- Succeeded by: Kathleen Matthews-Ward

Personal details
- Born: 16 June 1957 (age 69) Hamilton, Glasgow, Scotland
- Party: Labor Party
- Relatives: Eddie McGuire (brother)
- Occupation: Journalist
- Website: www.frankmcguire.com.au

Frank McGuire (born 16 June 1957) is an Australian politician who represented the Victorian Legislative Assembly seat of Broadmeadows for the Labor Party from the 2011 Broadmeadows by-election until the 2022 Victorian state election. McGuire was a journalist, political adviser, and business consultant prior to entering politics.

== Journalism ==
Prior to becoming a politician, McGuire was a journalist and the winner of two Walkley Awards for excellence in journalism. The first was in 1993, when he won the investigative report award for a segment called 'Deadly Force' that screened on ABC TV's Four Corners program in May 1992. In 2007, he won with fellow journalist Adam Shand, for a report on Nine Network's Sunday program, called "Force within a force" which was about alleged police corruption.

McGuire's experience includes being a news reporter at the Melbourne Herald (1976–1984); reporter/producer/deputy chief-of-staff on Ten News (1986–1990). He was a current affairs investigative and political reporter on The 7.30 Report (1990–1991) and on Four Corners (1992–1993).

== Local government taskforce ==
In 1999, McGuire was the founding chair of the City of Hume's Hume Safe City Taskforce, and served until 2004.

== Political career ==
McGuire served in several Parliamentary Secretary roles, including the Medical Research, Small Business, and Innovation portfolios.

In December 2021 he lost Labor preselection for the 2022 Victorian state election. He was succeeded by Kathleen Matthews-Ward.

== Honours and awards ==
- Walkley Award, 1993 and 2007
- Human Rights Television News and Current Affair Award, 1995
- Rotary International Paul Harris Fellow, 2003
- Hume City Council Award, 2010

== Personal life ==
McGuire was raised in Broadmeadows and lives in the inner Melbourne suburb of Fitzroy. McGuire and his brother, media personality and ex-Collingwood Football Club president, Eddie McGuire, were educated at Christian Brothers College in St Kilda on a scholarship.

McGuire is a keen follower of AFL football team, Essendon. McGuire has three children.

Victorian Legislative Assembly
Preceded by John Brumby	Member for Broadmeadows; 2011–2022	Succeeded by Kathleen Matthews-Ward
