= 1993 Cleveland mayoral election =

- November 2, 1993
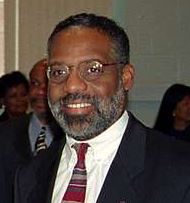

Candidate	Michael R. White	David Rock
Party	Nonpartisan	Nonpartisan
Popular vote	76,027	14,026
Percentage	84.43%	15.58%
Mayor before election
Michael R. White
Democratic
Elected mayor
Michael R. White
Democratic

The 1993 Cleveland mayoral election took place on November 2, 1993, to elect the Mayor of Cleveland, Ohio. It saw the reelection of Michael R. White to a second consecutive term. The election was officially nonpartisan.

White faced only token opposition.

== General election ==
Cleveland mayoral election, 1993
Candidate	Votes	%
Michael R. White (incumbent)	76,027	84.43%
David Rock	14,026	15.58%
Total votes	90,053	
