= 1993 Croatian local elections =

- 7 February 1993

On 7 February 1993, Croatia held its first local elections since it had declared independence from Yugoslavia. This was the time elections were held under the new law which abolished previous municipal categories Socio-Political Council, Council of Municipalities, Council of Associated Labor and introduced counties instead.

== Electoral system ==
Regional and local self-government elections were conducted so that half of the members of each county, city or municipal councils were elected through joint lists and the other half through individual constituencies. The electoral threshold was set at 5%. In constituencies where two or more candidates received the same number of votes the election was repeated. For each municipal council 16 councilors were elected, for each city council 26 councilors, and for each county assembly 40 councilors. The only exception was the City Assembly of Zagreb with 60 members. City and municipality mayors as well as county prefects are elected by the city, municipality and county council.

== Election results ==
=== Counties ===
Results of 1993 elections in Croatian counties
County	County council	
County	Plurality	Seats
Bjelovar-Bilogora	HDZ	15/42
Brod-Posavina	HDZ	31/42
Dubrovnik-Neretva	HDZ	23/40
Istria	IDS	35/40
Karlovac	HDZ	28/40
Koprivnica-Križevci	HSS	16/40
Krapina-Zagorje	HDZ	32/40
Lika-Senj	HDZ	35/40
Međimurje	HSLS, SDP, HNS, SDH	20/40
Osijek-Baranja	HDZ	26/40
Požega-Slavonia	HDZ	27/41
Primorje-Gorski Kotar	HSLS, SDP, HNS	25/40
Sisak-Moslavina	HDZ	27/41
Split-Dalmatia	HDZ	22/40
Šibenik	HDZ	22/43
Varaždin	HSLS, HNS, HKDU, SDP	16/40
Virovitica-Podravina	HDZ	29/42
Vukovar-Syrmia	HDZ	30/40
Zadar-Knin	HDZ	25/40
Zagreb County	HDZ	21/40
City of Zagreb	HDZ	36/60
Source: Election results

=== Cities ===
Results of 1993 elections in Croatian cities
	City Council	
City	Plurality	Seats
Beli Manastir	HDZ	26/26
Biograd na Moru	HDZ	11/26
Bjelovar	HSLS, HNS, SDP, HKDS, SRH	13/27
Buje	IDS	21/26
Buzet	IDS	23/26
Crikvenica	HSLS, HNS	17/26
Čabar	HSLS, SDP, HNS	14/26
Čakovec	HSLS, SDP, HNS, SDH	21/26
Daruvar	HSLS, HNS, HKDU, SDP	12/26
Drniš	HDZ	26/26
Dubrovnik	HDZ	14/26
Duga Resa	HDZ	15/26
Đakovo	HSS, HNS, SDP, HSLS, HKDU	13/26
Gospić	HDZ	25/26
Hvar	HDZ	12/26
Ilok	HDZ	26/26
Imotski	HDZ	16/26
Ivanić-Grad	HSLS	12/26
Karlovac	HDZ	14/31
Kaštela	HDZ	12/26
Knin	not held	
Koprivnica	HSLS, SDP, HNS	18/26
Korčula	HDZ	13/26
Krapina	HDZ	18/26
Križevci	HSS	12/26
Krk	HKDS, HSLS	9/26
Kutina	HSLS	12/27
Labin	IDS	24/26
Makarska	HDZ / SDP	11/26
Metković	HDZ	16/26
Našice	HSLS	16/28
Nova Gradiška	HDZ	18/26
Novi Vinodolski	SDH, SDP	14/26
Novska	HDZ	22/26
Ogulin	HDZ	17/26
Omiš	HDZ	10/25
Opatija	IDS	20/26
Osijek	HSLS	17/26
Otočac	HDZ	26/26
Pazin	IDS	18/26
Petrinja	HDZ	15/28
Ploče	HDZ	13/26
Podravska Slatina	HDZ / HSS, SDH	13/26
Poreč	IDS	23/26
Požega	HSLS	14/28
Pula	IDS	23/27
Rab	SDP, HNS, HSLS	14/26
Rijeka	HSLS, SDP, HNS	18/27
Rovinj	IDS	23/26
Samobor	HSLS, HNS, HKDS	15/26
Senj	HDZ	11/14^{1}
Sinj	HDZ	17/26
Sisak	HDZ	13/27
Slavonski Brod	HDZ	16/26
Slunj	HDZ	26/26
Solin	HDZ	18/26
Split	HSLS, HNS, HSS	13/26
Šibenik	HDZ	11/26
Trogir	HSLS	13/26
Valpovo	HDZ	14/26
Varaždin	HSLS, HNS, SDP, HKDU	19/26
Vinkovci	HDZ	16/26
Virovitica	HDZ	20/26
Vis	HDZ	16/26
Vukovar	HDZ	26/26
Zabok	HSLS	12/26
Zadar	HDZ	15/27
Zlatar	HDZ	23/26
Županja	HDZ	16/26
Source: Election results

1 Results available for 14 out of 26 seats.

== Elections in Capital ==
- 1993 Zagreb local elections
