= Electoral district of Glenroy =

Electoral district on Victoria, Australia

Glenroy Victoria—Legislative Assembly
- State: Victoria
- Created: 1976
- Abolished: 1985
- Namesake: Suburb of Glenroy
- Demographic: Metropolitan
- Coordinates: 37°42′S 144°55′E

Electoral district of Glenroy was an electoral district of the Legislative Assembly in the Australian state of Victoria.

== Members ==
Member	Party	Term
Jack Culpin	Labor	1976–1985
