= Jack Culpin =

Australian politician (1927–2014)

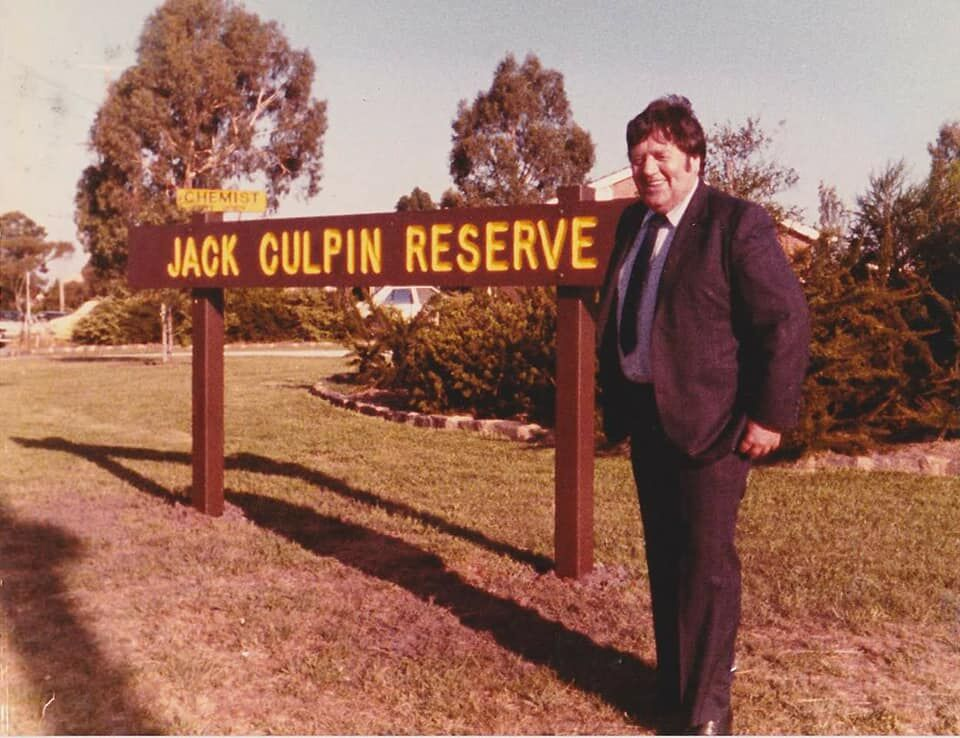

Member of the Victorian Legislative Assembly for Glenroy
- In office 20 March 1976 – 1 March 1985
- Preceded by: District created
- Succeeded by: District abolished

Member of the Victorian Legislative Assembly for Broadmeadows
- In office 2 March 1985 – 1 October 1988
- Preceded by: John Wilton
- Succeeded by: Jim Kennan

Personal details
- Born: John Albert Culpin; 4 October 1927 Collingwood, Victoria, Australia
- Died: 2 September 2014 (aged 86)
- Party: Independent (1988)
- Other political affiliations: Labor (until 1988)
- Spouse: June Marie Ballard (m. 1951)
- Profession: Electrical fitter

John Albert "Jack" Culpin (4 October 1927 – 2 September 2014) was an Australian politician.

Born in Collingwood to postal officer Albert Culpin and his wife Leura, he worked as an electrical fitter and was a shop steward with the Electrical Trades Union for twenty years. On 23 June 1951 he married June Marie Ballard (Deceased), with whom he had four sons Gary, Trevor, Rodney (Deceased) & Dale. In 1961 he was elected to Broadmeadows City Council, serving until 1978; he was mayor from 1965 to 1966. In 1976 he was elected to the Victorian Legislative Assembly as the Labor member for Glenroy, shifting to Broadmeadows in 1985. He resigned from the Labor Party in 1988 and was defeated as an independent candidate.

Jack Culpin died in Melbourne on 2 September 2014.
