= John Brumby =

Australian politician (born 1953)

The Honourable John Brumby AO
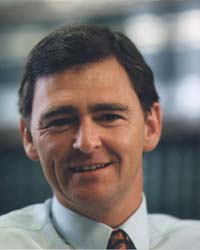

45th Premier of Victoria
- In office 30 July 2007 – 2 December 2010
- Monarch: Elizabeth II
- Governor: David de Kretser
- Deputy: Rob Hulls
- Preceded by: Steve Bracks
- Succeeded by: Ted Baillieu

8th Chancellor of La Trobe University
- Incumbent
- Assumed office 29 March 2019
- Preceded by: Richard Larkins

Leader of the Labor Party in Victoria
- In office 30 July 2007 – 3 December 2010
- Deputy: Rob Hulls
- Preceded by: Steve Bracks
- Succeeded by: Daniel Andrews
- In office 30 June 1993 – 19 March 1999
- Deputy: Bob Sercombe; Demetri Dollis; John Thwaites
- Preceded by: Jim Kennan
- Succeeded by: Steve Bracks

Leader of the Opposition in Victoria
- In office 28 September 1993 – 22 March 1999
- Premier: Jeff Kennett
- Deputy: Bob Sercombe; Demetri Dollis; John Thwaites
- Preceded by: Jim Kennan
- Succeeded by: Steve Bracks

Minister for Multicultural Affairs
- In office 30 July 2007 – 3 December 2010
- Premier: Himself
- Preceded by: Steve Bracks
- Succeeded by: Nicholas Kotsiras

Minister for Veterans' Affairs
- In office 30 July 2007 – 3 December 2010
- Premier: Himself
- Preceded by: Steve Bracks
- Succeeded by: Hugh Delahunty

Treasurer of Victoria
- In office 22 May 2000 – 3 August 2007
- Premier: Steve Bracks; Himself
- Preceded by: Steve Bracks
- Succeeded by: John Lenders

Minister for Regional and Rural Development
- In office 1 December 2006 – 3 August 2007
- Premier: Steve Bracks; Himself
- Preceded by: New position
- Succeeded by: Jacinta Allan

Minister for Innovation
- In office 12 February 2002 – 3 August 2007
- Premier: Steve Bracks; Himself
- Preceded by: New position
- Succeeded by: Gavin Jennings

Minister for State and Regional Development
- In office 20 October 1999 – 1 December 2006
- Premier: Steve Bracks
- Preceded by: Tom Reynolds
- Succeeded by: Theo Theophanous

Minister for Finance
- In office 20 October 1999 – 22 May 2000
- Premier: Steve Bracks
- Preceded by: Roger Hallam
- Succeeded by: Lynne Kosky

Member of the Victorian Legislative Assembly for Broadmeadows
- In office 18 September 1993 – 21 December 2010
- Preceded by: Jim Kennan
- Succeeded by: Frank McGuire

Member of the Victorian Legislative Council for Doutta Galla
- In office 20 February 1993 – 10 August 1993
- Preceded by: Bill Landeryou
- Succeeded by: Monica Gould

Member of the Australian Parliament for Bendigo
- In office 5 March 1983 – 24 March 1990
- Preceded by: John Bourchier
- Succeeded by: Bruce Reid

Personal details
- Born: John Mansfield Brumby; 21 April 1953 (age 73) Melbourne, Victoria, Australia
- Party: Labor
- Spouse: Rosemary McKenzie
- Children: 3
- Education: University of Melbourne
- Occupation: Teacher, union official
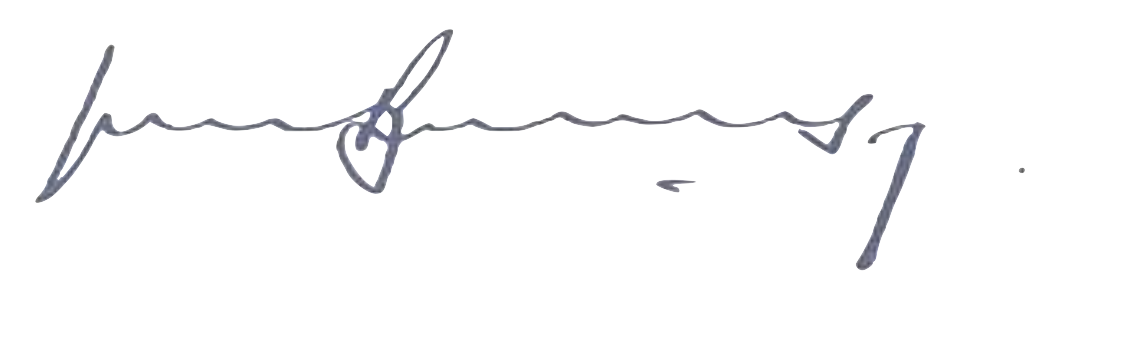
- Signature

John Mansfield Brumby AO (born 21 April 1953) is an Australian former politician and trade unionist who served as the 45th premier of Victoria from 2007 to 2010 and leader of the Victorian Labor Party from 1993 to 1999, and again from 2007 to 2010. He was the member of the Legislative Council for the district of Doutta Galla in 1993, and the member of the Legislative Assembly for the district of Broadmeadows from 1993 to 2010. Prior to state politics, Brumby had been the member of Parliament (MP) for the division of Bendigo from 1983 to 1990 and has served as the eighth chancellor of La Trobe University since his appointment in 2019.

He became premier of Victoria and leader of the Victorian Labor Party after the resignation of Premier Steve Bracks in 2007. Brumby has previously served as the Minister for Veterans' Affairs and the Minister for Multicultural Affairs. He contested his first election as premier at the November 2010 Victorian state election. His government was defeated by the Liberal/National Coalition led by Ted Baillieu. Brumby resigned as Labor leader after the election, on 30 November, to be replaced by Daniel Andrews. Within weeks of this leadership change, Brumby left parliament, with a Broadmeadows by-election taking place on 19 February 2011.

== Early life ==
Brumby was born in Melbourne on 21 April 1953. He is one of four children born to Alison Aird and Malcolm Brumby. His father was a World War II naval veteran and chartered accountant who became managing director of shoe retailer Ezywalkin. In the 1970s his parents relocated to a grazing property near Coleraine, Victoria, where his father served as president of the Wannon Shire Council in the 1990s.

Brumby grew up in the suburb of Ivanhoe. He was educated at Ivanhoe Grammar School and later Melbourne Grammar School. He graduated in commerce (BCom) at the University of Melbourne, in 1974; and he completed a Diploma of Education (DipEd) at the State College of Victoria at Rusden, in 1975.

Brumby was a teacher at Eaglehawk High School, in Bendigo, from 1976 to 1979. From 1979 to 1983, he was an employee of the Victorian Teachers Union. He was also active in the Labor Party.

== Political career ==
=== Federal MP ===
In 1983 Brumby was elected to the Australian House of Representatives for the seat of Bendigo, which he held until his defeat in 1990. A member of the Labor Unity faction, he was a strong supporter of Prime Minister Bob Hawke and an opponent of the Socialist Left faction, which historically had its stronghold in the Victorian branch of the Labor Party.

Brumby then worked as a consultant before being appointed chief of staff to the federal Minister for Resources and Tourism, Alan Griffiths with responsibility for the development of policy in areas such as energy, petroleum, minerals and tourism. He held this position until February 1993, when he was elected to the Victorian Legislative Council at a by-election for the seat of Doutta Galla Province in Melbourne's western suburbs.

=== State opposition leader ===
The Victorian Labor government of Joan Kirner was defeated at the October 1992 state elections by the Liberal Party led by Jeff Kennett. Kirner resigned as leader after a short period and was succeeded by her deputy Jim Kennan. When Kennan resigned from parliament in June 1993, Brumby was elected his successor. He resigned from the Legislative Council and was elected to the Victorian Legislative Assembly at a by-election for Kennan's seat of Broadmeadows in Melbourne's outer north.

In 1996, Brumby opposed the Kennett state government's proposed relocation of the State Museum to the Carlton Gardens site adjacent to the Royal Exhibition Building. At this time, Brumby first proposed that the Royal Exhibition Building and Carlton Gardens be nominated for World Heritage listing. The World Heritage nomination was opposed at the time by the Kennett Liberal state government. It was not until after the 1999 state election that the Bracks Labor government nominated and obtained World Heritage Listing for the site.

From 1993 to 1996, Brumby worked to restore Labor's fortunes in Victoria. The defeat of the federal Labor government in March 1996 prompted Kennett to call an early state election three weeks later. Labor only managed a net two-seat gain, leaving it 20 seats behind the Coalition. This defeat was claimed to have undermined Brumby's position as leader. Brumby was later replaced as Labor leader in March 1999, agreeing to resign in favour of Shadow Treasurer Steve Bracks.

=== Bracks government ===
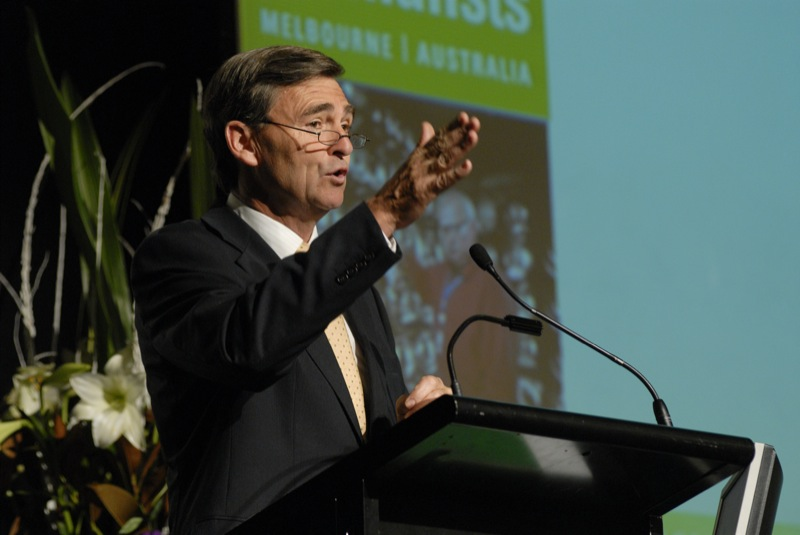
Brumby as Minister for Innovation giving a speech in April 2007

Steve Bracks narrowly won the state election called by Kennett in September 1999 and appointed Brumby as Minister for Finance, Assistant Treasurer and Minister for State and Regional Development. Brumby formed part of the core leadership team of senior ministers in the new government along with Bracks, Deputy Premier John Thwaites and Attorney-General Rob Hulls. Bracks initially served as treasurer and premier, assisted by Brumby who was responsible for Victoria's finances and most of the workload of the Treasury portfolio. On 22 May 2000, Brumby was appointed state treasurer.

As treasurer, Brumby presided over steady economic growth in Victoria, and his economic management was given some of the credit, along with the personal popularity of Bracks, for Labor's landslide re-elections in 2002 and 2006. Brumby ensured that the Labor Government maintained a budget surplus.

During 2004 Brumby was criticised by the state Liberal opposition for sharp increases in the rate of land tax in Victoria, which was criticised by many for potentially threatening the viability of many small businesses. Land tax rates were cut in the 2005 state budget. Faced with a choice of having to fund road infrastructure at the expense of the development of Victoria's schools, hospitals and public transport, Brumby decided to impose a toll on the new Scoresby Freeway (later known as EastLink) in eastern Melbourne. The decision, which broke a 2002 pre-election promise, provoked a hostile response from the Liberal Opposition and local community groups as well as caused the (Liberal) Federal Government to withhold its share of the funding for the project.

== Premier of Victoria ==
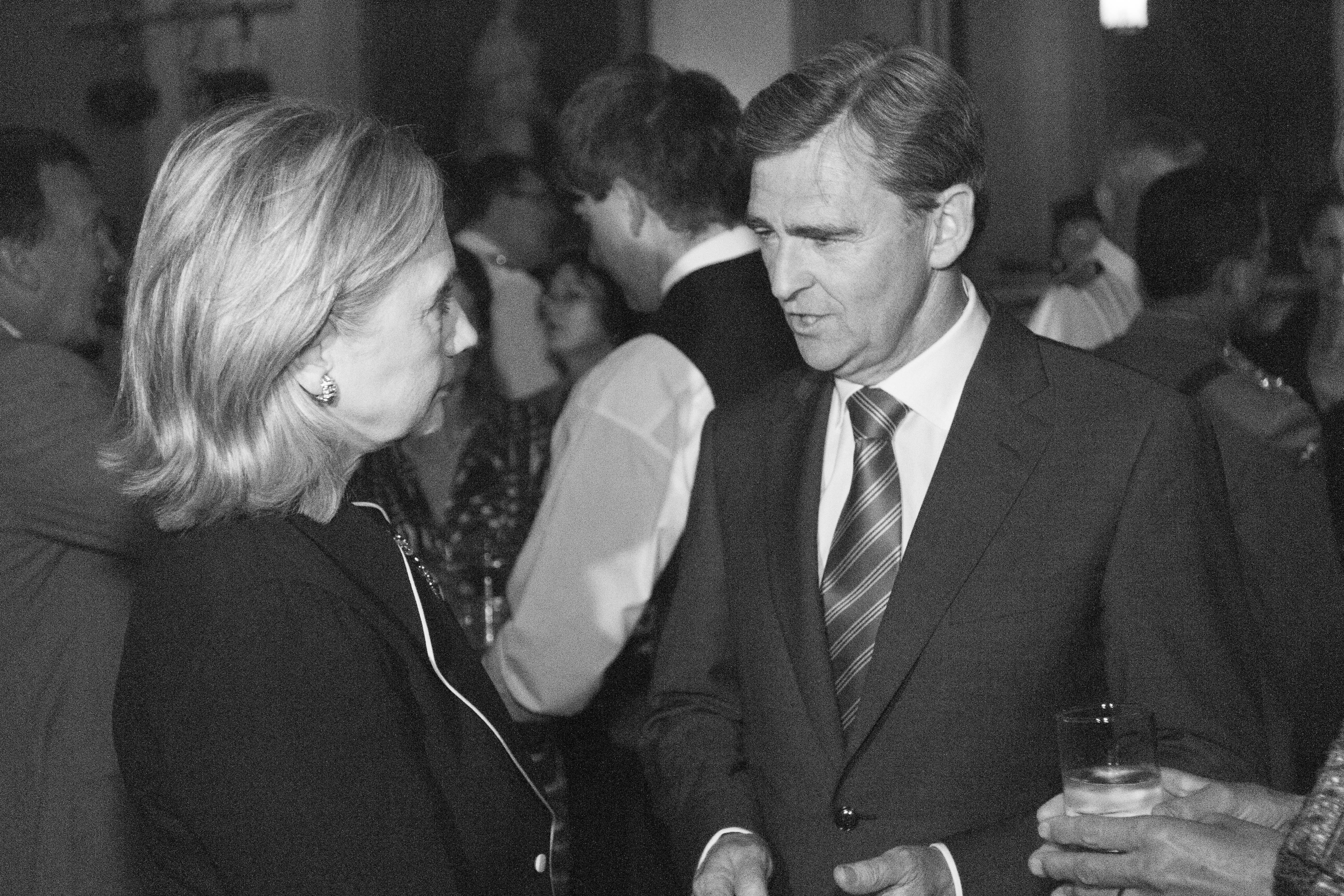
Brumby with U.S. Secretary of State Hillary Clinton

On 27 July 2007 the then Victorian premier, Steve Bracks, announced his retirement from politics, citing family reasons for the decision. Deputy Premier John Thwaites also announced his resignation later that day. On 30 July Brumby was elected unopposed as leader, and was sworn in as premier later that day with Attorney-General Rob Hulls as his deputy.

Brumby even gained the endorsement of Jeff Kennett, the man he made an unsuccessful attempt to oust as Premier at the 1996 election.

An early challenge occurred in November 2007 when State Labor MP Tammy Lobato publicly criticised Brumby over a decision by cabinet to allow genetically modified canola to be grown in Victoria. Other State Labor MPs were also said to be upset over Brumby's approach to the issue, and in particular, the way that he allegedly railroaded the policy through.

Brumby's response to a plan proposed by then Liberal Party Prime Minister John Howard for the federal government to assume control of the Murray-Darling Basin water catchment from the states was also an early issue. Under the previous Premier, Steve Bracks, Victoria had been the only state to refuse to accept Howard's plan. Following the election on 24 November 2007 of a new Australian Labor Party-controlled federal government Brumby agreed to commit Victoria to an amended plan on 26 March 2008.

In April 2008 he was widely applauded for his move to break up the Victorian poker machine gambling duopoly starting in 2012. The move was supported in particular by organisations such as the Interchurch Gambling Taskforce and the Australian Hotels Association. Some concerns, however, were raised that the decision could ultimately result in a A$1 billion compensation claim from the companies standing to lose their duopoly status as a result of the decision, Tattersalls and Tabcorp. The government, however, denied that any claim for compensation would be successful.

In May 2008, following the reporting of several episodes of violence in various Melbourne bars and clubs in the media, Brumby announced a 2am entry curfew on Melbourne city bars, pubs and clubs. The move sparked considerable opposition, with venue operators launching successful legal contests to the legislation, and patrons protesting outside State Parliament House. Brumby announced the dropping of the plan in November 2008, following an increase in violence which the legislation had been aimed at curbing. Critics of the curfew system called the plan populist and regressive, with little concern for the impact on the vast majority of club-goers that did not instigate violence. Subsequently, liquor licensing changes impacted live music venues, notably with The Tote Hotel (amongst others) claiming they had been forced into closure as the operator could no longer afford to support the extra staff required under changes to legislation. Critics argued that these types of venues were not often problem areas for police, and that legislative changes were poorly planned and implemented.

During 2008 Brumby's government passed an act decriminalising abortion.

He contested as Premier at the November 2010 Victorian state election and his government was narrowly defeated by the Liberal/National Coalition led by Ted Baillieu.

On 30 November, Brumby announced that he was standing down as Labor leader in Victoria, and that the parliamentary Labor Party would meet on 3 December to elect a new leader and shadow ministry. Ted Baillieu was sworn in as Premier on 2 December formally ending Brumby's tenure, with Brumby resigning from parliament on 21 December.

== Post-political career ==
Following his resignation from parliament, Brumby was appointed as a joint Vice Chancellor's Fellow at Monash University and the University of Melbourne, chairman of Motor Trades Association of Australia Superannuation Fund, member of the federal government's GST Distribution Review panel, and a director of Huawei in Australia. In 2017 he was appointed an Officer of the Order of Australia for distinguished service to the Parliament of Victoria, to economic management and medical biotechnology innovation, to improved rural and regional infrastructure, and to the community.

In February 2019, Brumby resigned from the Huawei board and in March 2019 took up his appointment as Chancellor of La Trobe University.

== Personal life ==
John Brumby is married to Rosemary McKenzie and has three children. His father, Malcolm Brumby, died from a stroke on 26 September 2010.

== See also ==
- Brumby Ministry

Parliament of Australia
Preceded by John Bourchier	Member for Bendigo; 1983–1990	Succeeded by Bruce Reid
Victorian Legislative Council
Preceded by Bill Landeryou	Member for Doutta Galla Province; 1993	Succeeded by Monica Gould
Victorian Legislative Assembly
Preceded by Jim Kennan	Member for Broadmeadows; 1993–2010	Succeeded by Frank McGuire
Party political offices
Preceded by Jim Kennan	Leader of the Australian Labor Party in Victoria; 1993–1999	Succeeded by Steve Bracks
Preceded by Steve Bracks	Leader of the Australian Labor Party in Victoria; 2007–2010	Succeeded by Daniel Andrews
Political offices
Preceded by Steve Bracks	Treasurer of Victoria; 2000–2007	Succeeded by John Lenders
Preceded by Steve Bracks	Premier of Victoria; 2007–2010	Succeeded by Ted Baillieu
Academic offices
Preceded by Richard Larkins	Chancellor of La Trobe University; 2019–present	Incumbent
