= Jim Kennan =

Australian politician (1946–2010)

The Honourable Jim Kennan SC

23rd Deputy Premier of Victoria
- In office 10 August 1990 – 6 October 1992
- Premier: Joan Kirner
- Preceded by: Joan Kirner
- Succeeded by: Pat McNamara

Leader of the Opposition of Victoria
- In office 22 March 1993 – 29 June 1993
- Premier: Jeff Kennett
- Deputy: Bob Sercombe
- Preceded by: Joan Kirner
- Succeeded by: John Brumby

Leader of the Labor Party in Victoria
- In office 22 March 1993 – 29 June 1993
- Deputy: Bob Sercombe
- Preceded by: Joan Kirner
- Succeeded by: John Brumby

Member of the Victorian Legislative Assembly for Broadmeadows
- In office 1 October 1988 – 29 June 1993
- Preceded by: Jack Culpin
- Succeeded by: John Brumby

Member of the Victorian Legislative Council for Thomastown
- In office 1 June 1982 – 23 August 1988
- Preceded by: Dolph Eddy
- Succeeded by: Abolished

Personal details
- Born: James Harley Kennan; 25 February 1946 Melbourne, Victoria, Australia
- Died: 4 August 2010 (aged 64)
- Party: Labor Party
- Spouse: Janet Alexander (m. 1969)
- Education: University of Melbourne
- Profession: Barrister

James Harley Kennan SC (25 February 1946 – 4 August 2010) was an Australian politician and later adjunct professor of law at Deakin University.

Kennan earned a Master of Laws from the University of Melbourne. He was a member of parliament between 1982 and 1993, initially in the Victorian Legislative Council, and then in the Legislative Assembly as the member for Broadmeadows and was Deputy Premier of Victoria from 1990 to 1992.

After the defeat of the Labor Party Government at the 1992 state election, and the later retirement of leader Joan Kirner in March 1993 he became the Leader of the Opposition. On 29 June 1993, Kennan announced his immediate resignation as party leader and retirement from parliament, stating that he did not have "the depth of commitment for politics that I think is required in this job". He was succeeded as leader and member for Broadmeadows by a former member of the Legislative Council, John Brumby. To date, Kennan is the last Victorian Labor leader who did not become Premier.

In the early 1990s, Kennan was identified as part of the informal "Victorian Independents" faction within the ALP, along with John Button, Michael Duffy and Barry Jones.

He worked as a Senior Counsel in the Victorian legal system, most notably representing Jack Thomas at his re-trial on terrorism charges in late 2008.

== Death ==
Kennan died on 4 August 2010, aged 64, after a battle with cancer.

Victorian Legislative Council
Preceded by Dolph Eddy	Member for Thomastown; June 1982 – August 1988	Succeeded by seat abolished
Political offices
Preceded by John Cain	Attorney-General of Victoria; 8 September 1983 – 13 December 1987	Succeeded by Andrew McCutcheon
Preceded by Andrew McCutcheon	Attorney-General of Victoria; 2 April 1990 – 5 October 1992	Succeeded by Jan Wade
Victorian Legislative Assembly
Preceded by Jack Culpin	Member for Broadmeadows; October 1988 – June 1993	Succeeded by John Brumby
Party political offices
Preceded by Joan Kirner	Leader of the Labor Party, Victoria; 1993	Succeeded by John Brumby
