= Electoral results for the district of Hawthorn =

Victoria, Australia, district election results

This is a list of electoral results for the district of Hawthorn in Victorian state elections.

== Members for Hawthorn ==
Member	Party	Term
Charles Taylor	Liberal	1889–1894
Robert Murray Smith	Conservative	1894–1900
Robert Barbour	Liberal	1900–1901
Robert Barbour	Ministerialist	1901–1902
George Swinburne	Ministerialist	1902–1907
George Swinburne	Independent	1907–1911
George Swinburne	Liberal	1911–1913
William Murray McPherson	Liberal	1913–1916
William Murray McPherson	Economy	1916–1917
William Murray McPherson	Nationalist	1917–1930
John Gray	Nationalist	1930–1931
John Gray	United Australia	1931–1939
Les Tyack	United Australia	1939–1940
Leslie Hollins	Independent	1940–1945
Fred Edmunds	Liberal	1945–1949
Fred Edmunds	Independent	1949–1950
Les Tyack	Liberal	1950–1952
Charles Murphy	Labor	1952–1955
Charles Murphy	Labor (Anti-Communist)	1955
Jim Manson	Liberal	1955–1958
Peter Garrisson	Liberal	1958–1963
Peter Garrisson	Independent	1963–1964
Walter Jona	Liberal	1964–1985
Phil Gude	Liberal	1985–1999
Ted Baillieu	Liberal	1999–2014
John Pesutto	Liberal	2014–2018
John Kennedy	Labor	2018–2022
John Pesutto	Liberal	2022–present

== Election results ==
=== Elections in the 2020s ===
==== 2022 ====
2022 Victorian state election: Hawthorn
Party	Candidate	Votes	%	±%
Liberal	John Pesutto	18,728	42.3	−1.8
Labor	John Kennedy	9,799	22.1	−10.9
Independent	Melissa Lowe	8,851	20.0	+20.0
Greens	Nick Savage	4,927	11.1	−6.4
Animal Justice	Faith Fuhrer	660	1.5	−0.7
Liberal Democrats	Richard Peppard	583	1.3	+1.3
Family First	Ken Triantafillis	408	0.9	+0.9
Democratic Labour	Stratton Bell	354	0.8	+0.8
Total formal votes		44,310	97.4	+1.0
Informal votes		1,178	2.6	−1.0
Turnout		45,488	90.8	+1.2
Two-party-preferred result
Liberal	John Pesutto	22,927	51.7	+2.3
Labor	John Kennedy	21,383	48.3	–2.3
Liberal gain from Labor		Swing	+2.3	

=== Elections in the 2010s ===
==== 2018 ====
2018 Victorian state election: Hawthorn
Party	Candidate	Votes	%	±%
Liberal	John Pesutto	17,231	43.89	−10.60
Labor	John Kennedy	12,646	32.21	+8.04
Greens	Nicholas Bieber	7,167	18.26	−3.07
Sustainable Australia	Sophie Paterson	960	2.45	+2.45
Animal Justice	Catherine Wright	885	2.25	+2.25
Independent	Richard Grummet	367	0.93	+0.93
Total formal votes		39,256	96.41	+0.16
Informal votes		1,462	3.59	−0.16
Turnout		40,718	90.83	−2.12
Two-party-preferred result
Labor	John Kennedy	19,793	50.42	+9.01
Liberal	John Pesutto	19,463	49.58	−9.01
Labor gain from Liberal		Swing	+9.01	

==== 2014 ====
2014 Victorian state election: Hawthorn
Party	Candidate	Votes	%	±%
Liberal	John Pesutto	20,551	54.5	−6.3
Labor	John McNally	9,117	24.2	+3.1
Greens	Tim Hartnett	8,042	21.3	+4.5
Total formal votes		37,710	96.2	−0.8
Informal votes		1,470	3.8	+0.8
Turnout		39,180	93.0	+1.9
Two-party-preferred result
Liberal	John Pesutto	22,041	58.6	−8.0
Labor	John McNally	15,577	41.4	+8.0
Liberal hold		Swing	−8.0	

==== 2010 ====
2010 Victorian state election: Hawthorn
Party	Candidate	Votes	%	±%
Liberal	Ted Baillieu	21,036	60.89	+4.83
Labor	John McNally	7,218	20.89	−4.81
Greens	Jenny Henty	5,883	17.03	+0.78
Family First	Peter Grounds	409	1.18	−0.80
Total formal votes		34,546	97.06	−0.36
Informal votes		1,046	2.94	+0.36
Turnout		35,593	91.85	+1.02
Two-party-preferred result
Liberal	Ted Baillieu	23,060	66.74	+4.48
Labor	John McNally	11,493	33.26	−4.48
Liberal hold		Swing	+4.48	

=== Elections in the 2000s ===
==== 2006 ====
2006 Victorian state election: Hawthorn
Party	Candidate	Votes	%	±%
Liberal	Ted Baillieu	18,860	56.1	+6.4
Labor	John McNally	8,647	25.7	−4.8
Greens	Lynda Birch	5,467	16.3	−3.5
Family First	Veronica Sidhu	667	2.0	+2.0
Total formal votes		33,641	97.4	+0.1
Informal votes		890	2.6	−0.1
Turnout		34,531	90.8	
Two-party-preferred result
Liberal	Ted Baillieu	20,941	62.3	+6.4
Labor	John McNally	12,694	37.7	−6.4
Liberal hold		Swing	+6.4	

==== 2002 ====
2002 Victorian state election: Hawthorn
Party	Candidate	Votes	%	±%
Liberal	Ted Baillieu	16,407	49.7	−12.9
Labor	Avis Meddings	10,082	30.5	−1.9
Greens	Tania Giles	6,544	19.8	+19.8
Total formal votes		33,033	97.3	−0.4
Informal votes		921	2.7	+0.4
Turnout		33,954	91.9	
Two-party-preferred result
Liberal	Ted Baillieu	18,458	55.9	−8.2
Labor	Avis Meddings	14,575	44.1	+8.2
Liberal hold		Swing	−8.2	

=== Elections in the 1990s ===
==== 1999 ====
1999 Victorian state election: Hawthorn
Party	Candidate	Votes	%	±%
Liberal	Ted Baillieu	20,548	62.6	+1.7
Labor	N. R. Wickiramasingham	10,635	32.4	+3.3
Hope	Kerry Dawborn	1,650	5.0	+5.0
Total formal votes		32,833	97.6	−1.1
Informal votes		792	2.4	+1.1
Turnout		33,625	91.0	
Two-party-preferred result
Liberal	Ted Baillieu	21,042	64.1	+0.5
Labor	N. R. Wickiramasingham	11,791	35.9	−0.5
Liberal hold		Swing	+0.5	

==== 1996 ====
1996 Victorian state election: Hawthorn
Party	Candidate	Votes	%	±%
Liberal	Phil Gude	20,251	60.9	−4.1
Labor	Ian Cleaver-Wilkinson	9,662	29.1	+3.5
Independent	Jenny Henty	2,744	8.3	+8.3
Natural Law	Lorna Scurfield	592	1.8	−7.6
Total formal votes		33,249	98.8	+1.7
Informal votes		406	1.2	−1.7
Turnout		33,655	94.4	
Two-party-preferred result
Liberal	Phil Gude	21,068	63.6	−4.8
Labor	Ian Cleaver-Wilkinson	12,077	36.4	+4.8
Liberal hold		Swing	−4.8	

==== 1992 ====
1992 Victorian state election: Hawthorn
Party	Candidate	Votes	%	±%
Liberal	Phil Gude	20,571	65.0	+6.4
Labor	Gordon McCaskie	8,096	25.6	−15.5
Natural Law	Lorna Scurfield	2,983	9.4	+9.4
Total formal votes		31,650	97.1	+0.2
Informal votes		933	2.9	−0.2
Turnout		32,583	94.0	
Two-party-preferred result
Liberal	Phil Gude	21,619	68.4	+9.6
Labor	Gordon McCaskie	9,984	31.6	−9.6
Liberal hold		Swing	+9.6	

=== Elections in the 1980s ===
==== 1988 ====
1988 Victorian state election: Hawthorn
Party	Candidate	Votes	%	±%
Liberal	Phil Gude	15,213	58.03	+2.28
Labor	Bridget Groves	11,001	41.97	−2.28
Total formal votes		26,214	96.82	−0.61
Informal votes		861	3.18	+0.61
Turnout		27,075	89.33	−1.15
Liberal hold		Swing	+2.28	

==== 1985 ====
1985 Victorian state election: Hawthorn
Party	Candidate	Votes	%	±%
Liberal	Phil Gude	15,605	55.7	+4.3
Labor	Jill Eastwood	12,387	44.3	+3.2
Total formal votes		27,992	97.4	
Informal votes		738	2.6	
Turnout		28,730	90.5	
Liberal hold		Swing	+1.5	

==== 1982 ====
1982 Victorian state election: Hawthorn
Party	Candidate	Votes	%	±%
Liberal	Walter Jona	11,509	50.0	−4.7
Labor	Jennifer Eastwood	9,889	42.9	+6.3
Democrats	Mark Harris	1,638	7.1	−1.6
Total formal votes		23,036	98.0	+0.4
Informal votes		461	2.0	−0.4
Turnout		23,497	90.9	+1.6
Two-party-preferred result
Liberal	Walter Jona	12,118	52.6	−7.2
Labor	Jennifer Eastwood	10,918	47.4	+7.2
Liberal hold		Swing	−7.2	

=== Elections in the 1970s ===
==== 1979 ====
1979 Victorian state election: Hawthorn
Party	Candidate	Votes	%	±%
Liberal	Walter Jona	12,903	54.7	+0.4
Labor	Kevin Zervos	8,620	36.6	−1.4
Democrats	Alberta Steegstra	2,050	8.7	+8.7
Total formal votes		23,573	97.6	−0.4
Informal votes		581	2.4	+0.4
Turnout		24,154	89.3	−1.3
Two-party-preferred result
Liberal	Walter Jona	14,102	59.8	−0.9
Labor	Kevin Zervos	9,471	40.2	+0.9
Liberal hold		Swing	−0.9	

==== 1976 ====
1976 Victorian state election: Hawthorn
Party	Candidate	Votes	%	±%
Liberal	Walter Jona	13,580	54.3	+1.0
Labor	Evan Walker	9,487	38.0	+2.9
Democratic Labor	Daniel Condon	1,556	6.2	−1.2
Independent	Jennifer Relf	361	1.4	+1.4
Total formal votes		24,984	98.0	
Informal votes		506	2.0	
Turnout		25,490	90.6	
Two-party-preferred result
Liberal	Walter Jona	15,161	60.7	−1.1
Labor	Evan Walker	9,823	39.3	+1.1
Liberal hold		Swing	−1.1	

==== 1973 ====
1973 Victorian state election: Hawthorn
Party	Candidate	Votes	%	±%
Liberal	Walter Jona	12,190	51.0	+5.0
Labor	Evan Walker	8,800	36.8	−4.9
Democratic Labor	Bernard Gaynor	1,785	7.5	−4.8
Australia	John Worcester	1,136	4.8	+4.8
Total formal votes		23,911	97.1	+0.3
Informal votes		703	2.9	−0.3
Turnout		24,614	89.6	−2.8
Two-party-preferred result
Liberal	Walter Jona	14,162	59.2	+2.6
Labor	Evan Walker	9,749	40.8	−2.6
Liberal hold		Swing	+2.6	

==== 1970 ====
1970 Victorian state election: Hawthorn
Party	Candidate	Votes	%	±%
Liberal	Walter Jona	10,285	46.0	−1.7
Labor	David Andrews	9,313	41.7	+6.2
Democratic Labor	Bernard Gaynor	2,749	12.3	−4.5
Total formal votes		22,347	96.8	0.0
Informal votes		734	3.2	0.0
Turnout		23,081	92.4	+0.6
Two-party-preferred result
Liberal	Walter Jona	12,652	56.6	−3.0
Labor	David Andrews	9,695	43.4	+3.0
Liberal hold		Swing	−3.0	

=== Elections in the 1960s ===
==== 1967 ====
1967 Victorian state election: Hawthorn
Party	Candidate	Votes	%	±%
Liberal	Walter Jona	10,722	47.7	+3.7
Labor	Dolph Eddy	7,968	35.5	−0.1
Democratic Labor	Daniel Condon	3,766	16.8	+3.3
Total formal votes		22,456	96.8	
Informal votes		738	3.2	
Turnout		23,194	93.0	
Two-party-preferred result
Liberal	Walter Jona	13,390	59.6	−0.6
Labor	Dolph Eddy	9,066	40.4	+0.6
Liberal hold		Swing	−0.6	

==== 1964 ====
1964 Victorian state election: Hawthorn
Party	Candidate	Votes	%	±%
Labor	Horrie Garrick	6,454	39.3	−0.6
Liberal and Country	Walter Jona	5,973	36.4	−6.0
Democratic Labor	Charles Murphy	2,112	12.9	−4.8
Independent Liberal	Peter Garrisson	1,505	9.2	+9.2
Centre	Geoffrey Broomhall	374	2.3	+2.3
Total formal votes		16,418	95.3	−1.8
Informal votes		812	4.7	+1.8
Turnout		17,230	92.8	+1.0
Two-party-preferred result
Liberal and Country	Walter Jona	9,242	56.4	−0.9
Labor	Horrie Garrick	7,156	43.6	+0.9
Liberal and Country hold		Swing	−0.9	

==== 1961 ====
1961 Victorian state election: Hawthorn
Party	Candidate	Votes	%	±%
Liberal and Country	Peter Garrisson	7,071	42.4	+1.2
Labor	John Reeves	6,657	39.9	−0.4
Democratic Labor	Charles Murphy	2,963	17.7	−0.7
Total formal votes		16,691	97.1	−0.7
Informal votes		496	2.9	+0.7
Turnout		17,187	91.8	−0.7
Two-party-preferred result
Liberal and Country	Peter Garrisson	9,568	57.3	+0.5
Labor	John Reeves	7,123	42.7	−0.5
Liberal and Country hold		Swing	+0.5	

=== Elections in the 1950s ===
==== 1958 ====
1958 Victorian state election: Hawthorn
Party	Candidate	Votes	%	±%
Liberal and Country	Peter Garrisson	7,469	41.2	
Labor	Jack Poke	7,308	40.3	
Democratic Labor	Charles Murphy	3,337	18.4	
Total formal votes		18,114	97.8	
Informal votes		404	2.2	
Turnout		18,518	92.5	
Two-party-preferred result
Liberal and Country	Peter Garrisson	10,295	56.8	
Labor	Jack Poke	7,819	43.2	
Liberal and Country hold		Swing		

==== 1955 ====
1955 Victorian state election: Hawthorn
Party	Candidate	Votes	%	±%
Liberal and Country	Jim Manson	7,247	44.2	
Labor	Jack Poke	5,097	31.1	
Labor (A-C)	Charles Murphy	3,739	22.8	
Henry George Justice	William Pitt	313	1.9	
Total formal votes		16,396	97.7	
Informal votes		390	2.3	
Turnout		16,786	94.7	
Two-party-preferred result
Liberal and Country	Jim Manson	8,518	52.0	
Labor	Jack Poke	7,878	48.0	
Liberal and Country gain from Labor		Swing		

==== 1952 ====
1952 Victorian state election: Hawthorn
Party	Candidate	Votes	%	±%
Labor	Charles Murphy	9,948	48.7	+6.8
Liberal and Country	Les Tyack	6,813	33.3	−6.5
Electoral Reform	Charles Calderwood	3,677	18.0	+18.0
Total formal votes		20,438	98.0	−1.1
Informal votes		409	2.0	+1.1
Turnout		20,847	94.2	+0.5
Two-party-preferred result
Labor	Charles Murphy	10,940	53.5	+7.8
Liberal and Country	Les Tyack	9,498	46.5	−7.8
Labor gain from Liberal and Country		Swing	+7.8	

==== 1950 ====
1950 Victorian state election: Hawthorn
Party	Candidate	Votes	%	±%
Labor	Charles Murphy	9,361	41.9	+6.7
Liberal and Country	Les Tyack	8,887	39.8	−12.0
Independent Liberal	Fred Edmunds	4,100	18.3	+18.3
Total formal votes		22,348	99.1	+0.3
Informal votes		203	0.9	−0.3
Turnout		22,551	93.7	+0.5
Two-party-preferred result
Liberal and Country	Les Tyack	12,134	54.3	−6.7
Labor	Charles Murphy	10,214	45.7	+6.7
Liberal and Country hold		Swing	−6.7	

=== Elections in the 1940s ===
==== 1947 ====
1947 Victorian state election: Hawthorn
Party	Candidate	Votes	%	±%
Liberal	Fred Edmunds	12,296	51.8	+19.1
Labor	Charles Murphy	8,337	35.2	−0.2
Independent	Leslie Hollins	3,088	13.0	−18.9
Total formal votes		23,721	98.8	+0.8
Informal votes		293	1.2	−0.8
Turnout		24,014	93.2	+5.6
Liberal hold		Swing	N/A	

- Preferences were not distributed.

==== 1945 ====
1945 Victorian state election: Hawthorn
Party	Candidate	Votes	%	±%
Labor	Charles Murphy	7,738	35.4	
Liberal	Fred Edmunds	7,139	32.7	
Independent	Leslie Hollins	6,975	31.9	
Total formal votes		21,852	98.0	
Informal votes		443	2.0	
Turnout		22,295	87.6	
Two-party-preferred result
Liberal	Fred Edmunds	12,062	55.2	
Labor	Charles Murphy	9,790	44.8	
Liberal gain from Independent		Swing		

==== 1943 ====
1943 Victorian state election: Hawthorn
Party	Candidate	Votes	%	±%
Independent	Leslie Hollins	15,560	63.2	+9.3
United Australia	Lyston Chisholm	9,065	36.8	−9.3
Total formal votes		24,625	97.6	−1.2
Informal votes		598	2.4	+1.2
Turnout		25,223	88.5	−5.2
Independent hold		Swing	+9.3	

==== 1940 ====
1940 Victorian state election: Hawthorn
Party	Candidate	Votes	%	±%
Independent	Leslie Hollins	12,918	53.9	+53.9
United Australia	Les Tyack	11,034	46.1	−14.4
Total formal votes		12,918	98.8	−0.1
Informal votes		301	1.2	+0.1
Turnout		24,253	93.7	+1.6
Independent gain from United Australia		Swing	N/A	

=== Elections in the 1930s ===
==== 1939 by-election ====
1939 Hawthorn state by-election
Party	Candidate	Votes	%	±%
Labor	Albert Nicholls	5,986	27.5	−12.0
United Australia	Les Tyack	5,769	26.5	−34.0
Independent	Leslie Hollins	3,428	15.8	+15.8
Ind. United Australia	John Chirnside	2,754	12.7	+12.7
Ind. United Australia	William Vaughan	2,193	10.1	+10.1
Progressive Independent	Benjamin Nicholson	1,606	7.4	+7.4
Total formal votes		21,736	95.8	−3.1
Informal votes		948	4.2	+3.1
Turnout		22,684	89.1	−3.0
Two-party-preferred result
United Australia	Les Tyack	11,757	54.1	−6.4
Labor	Albert Nicholls	9,979	45.9	+6.4
United Australia hold		Swing	−6.4	

==== 1937 ====
1937 Victorian state election: Hawthorn
Party	Candidate	Votes	%	±%
United Australia	John Gray	14,192	60.5	+6.4
Labor	Herbert Oke	9,275	39.5	+39.5
Total formal votes		23,467	98.9	+0.3
Informal votes		267	1.1	−0.3
Turnout		23,734	92.1	−2.4
United Australia hold		Swing	N/A	

==== 1935 ====
1935 Victorian state election: Hawthorn
Party	Candidate	Votes	%	±%
United Australia	John Gray	12,076	54.1	−45.9
Social Credit	Leslie Hollins	10,229	45.9	+45.9
Total formal votes		22,305	98.6	
Informal votes		325	1.4	
Turnout		22,630	94.5	
United Australia hold		Swing	N/A	

==== 1932 ====
1932 Victorian state election: Hawthorn
Party	Candidate	Votes	%	±%
United Australia	John Gray	unopposed		
United Australia hold		Swing		

==== 1930 by-election ====
The 1930 Hawthorn state by-election was held on 27 September 1930 following the resignation of incumbent MP William Murray McPherson. McPherson, who was Premier of Victoria from November 1928 until December 1929, had been defeated in a vote of no confidence following the 1929 state election. In August 1930, he announced his resignation as Nationalist Party leader and from politics.

1930 Hawthorn state by-election
Party	Candidate	Votes	%	±%
Nationalist	John Gray	12,430	63.6	+10.3
Labor	William Hulse	7,116	36.4	−10.3
Total formal votes		19,546	99.2	0.0
Informal votes		167	0.8	0.0
Turnout		19,713	89.0	−5.4
Nationalist hold		Swing	+10.3	

=== Elections in the 1920s ===
==== 1929 ====
1929 Victorian state election: Hawthorn
Party	Candidate	Votes	%	±%
Nationalist	William McPherson	10,978	53.3	−4.3
Labor	William Hulse	9,614	46.7	+4.3
Total formal votes		20,592	99.2	+0.5
Informal votes		167	0.8	−0.5
Turnout		20,759	92.9	−1.5
Nationalist hold		Swing	−4.3	

==== 1927 ====
1927 Victorian state election: Hawthorn
Party	Candidate	Votes	%	±%
Nationalist	William McPherson	11,610	57.6	
Labor	Edward Cummins	8,555	42.4	
Total formal votes		20,165	98.7	
Informal votes		268	1.3	
Turnout		20,433	94.4	
Nationalist hold		Swing		

==== 1924 ====
1924 Victorian state election: Hawthorn
Party	Candidate	Votes	%	±%
Nationalist	William McPherson	9,576	50.6	−49.4
Labor	Edward Cummins	6,545	34.6	+34.6
Independent Liberal	Horace Mason	2,812	14.8	+14.8
Total formal votes		18,933	98.6	
Informal votes		275	1.4	
Turnout		19,208	59.8	
Two-party-preferred result
Nationalist	William McPherson		63.9	−36.1
Labor	Edward Cummins		36.1	+36.1
Nationalist hold		Swing	N/A	

- Two party preferred vote was estimated.

==== 1921 ====
1921 Victorian state election: Hawthorn
Party	Candidate	Votes	%	±%
Nationalist	William McPherson	unopposed		
Nationalist hold		Swing		

==== 1920 ====
1920 Victorian state election: Hawthorn
Party	Candidate	Votes	%	±%
Nationalist	William McPherson	8,312	49.9	
Ind. Nationalist	Charles Smith	4,365	26.2	+26.2
Ind. Nationalist	Cecil Brack	3,996	24.0	+24.0
Total formal votes		16,673	91.3	
Informal votes		1,583	8.7	
Turnout		18,256	63.1	
Two-candidate-preferred result
Nationalist	William McPherson	10,284	61.7	
Ind. Nationalist	Charles Smith	6,389	38.3	
Nationalist hold		Swing	N/A	

=== Elections in the 1910s ===
==== 1917 ====
1917 Victorian state election: Hawthorn
Party	Candidate	Votes	%	±%
Nationalist	William McPherson	unopposed		
Nationalist hold		Swing		

==== 1914 ====
1914 Victorian state election: Hawthorn
Party	Candidate	Votes	%	±%
Liberal	William McPherson	6,187	76.1	+12.8
Independent	Frederick Dawborn	1,939	23.9	+14.5
Total formal votes		8,126	97.9	−0.6
Informal votes		171	2.1	+0.6
Turnout		8,297	34.5	−30.4
Liberal hold		Swing	N/A	

==== 1911 ====
1911 Victorian state election: Hawthorn
Party	Candidate	Votes	%	±%
Liberal	George Swinburne	8,344	63.3	+13.2
Labor	John Fraser	3,594	27.3	+27.3
Independent Liberal	Frederick Dawborn	1,238	9.4	−40.5
Total formal votes		13,356	98.5	−1.0
Informal votes		197	1.5	+1.0
Turnout		13,373	64.9	+17.3
Two-party-preferred result
Liberal	George Swinburne		70.9	
Labor	John Fraser		29.1	
Liberal hold		Swing	N/A	

- Two party preferred vote was estimated.
