= 1939 Hawthorn state by-election =

- 10 June 1939

Electoral district of Hawthorn in the Victorian Legislative Assembly
- Registered: 25,459
- Turnout: 89.1% (▼3.0)
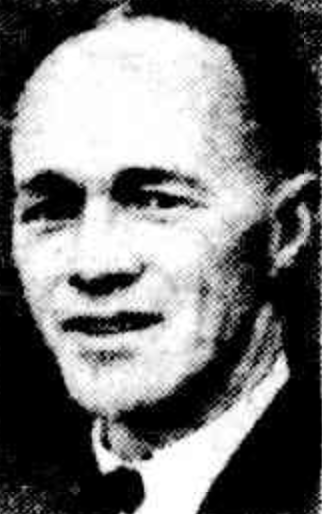

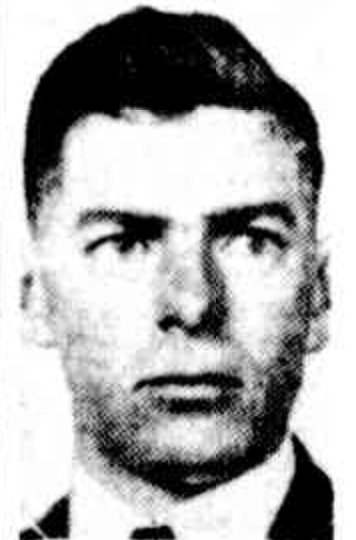

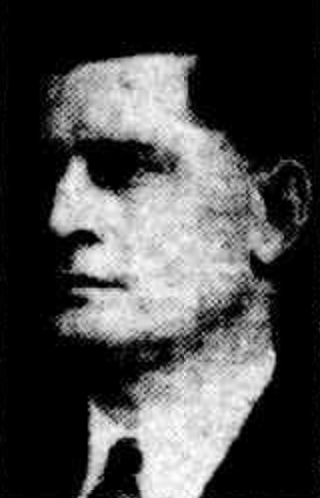
	First party	Second party	Third party
Candidate	Albert Nicholls	Les Tyack	Leslie Hollins
Party	Labor	United Australia	Independent
Primary vote	5,986	5,769	3,428
Percentage	27.5%	26.5%	15.8%
Swing	▼12.0	▼34.0	▲15.8
2PP	45.9%	54.1%
2PP swing	▲6.4	▼6.4
MP before election
John Gray
United Australia
Elected MP
Les Tyack
United Australia

The 1939 Hawthorn state by-election was held on 10 June 1939 to elect the member for Hawthorn in the Victorian Legislative Assembly, following the death of United Australia Party (UAP) MP John Gray.

Despite a 34% swing away from the UAP (two Independent UAP candidates were also contesting), Les Tyack won the seat for the UAP against Labor candidate Albert Nicholls with 54.1% of the two-party-preferred vote.

Tyack lost the seat one year later at the 1940 state election, when he was defeated by Leslie Hollins (who unsuccessfully contested the by-election as an independent). Tyack again won Hawthorn in 1950, but lost his seat in 1952.

== Key events ==
- 6 May 1939 – John Gray dies
- 17 May 1939 – Writ of election issued by the Speaker of the Legislative Assembly
- 29 May 1939 – Candidate nominations close
- 10 June 1939 – Polling day
- 12 June 1939 – Return of writ

== Candidates ==
Candidates are listed in the order they appeared on the ballot.

Party	Candidate	Background
Ind. United Australia	John Chirnside	Manager
Independent	Leslie Hollins	Automotive engineer
Labor	Albert Nicholls	Public accountant
Progressive Independent	Benjamin Nicholson	Former soldier who stood for UAP preselection
United Australia	Les Tyack	Hawthorn councillor
Ind. United Australia	William Vaughan	Printer and publisher

Additionally, L. H. Hagon declined to contest and William Hulse (Labor's candidate in 1929 and 1930) lost Labor preselection.

== Results ==
1939 Hawthorn state by-election
Party	Candidate	Votes	%	±%
Labor	Albert Nicholls	5,986	27.5	−12.0
United Australia	Les Tyack	5,769	26.5	−34.0
Independent	Leslie Hollins	3,428	15.8	+15.8
Ind. United Australia	John Chirnside	2,754	12.7	+12.7
Ind. United Australia	William Vaughan	2,193	10.1	+10.1
Progressive Independent	Benjamin Nicholson	1,606	7.4	+7.4
Total formal votes		21,736	95.8	−3.1
Informal votes		948	4.2	+3.1
Turnout		22,684	89.1	−3.0
Two-party-preferred result
United Australia	Les Tyack	11,757	54.1	−6.4
Labor	Albert Nicholls	9,979	45.9	+6.4
United Australia hold		Swing	−6.4	

== See also ==
- Electoral results for the district of Hawthorn
- List of Victorian state by-elections
