= Shenton House =

Shenton House may refer to:

- Shenton House, Victoria, a heritage-listed house in Melbourne, Victoria, Australia
- Shenton House, Western Australia, a heritage-listed house in Perth, Western Australia
