= Les Tyack =

Australian politician

Leslie Tyack MBE (17 December 1899 – 19 May 1970) was an Australian politician.

He was born in Melbourne and attended state school at Portarlington. He worked for the Sunshine Harvester Company, before serving in World War I in France. On his return he qualified as a chartered accountant and worked for the Victorian Crown Law Department. On 15 January 1927, he married schoolteacher Thelma Camille La Mascotte Kirkham, with whom he had one daughter. He worked as an accountant for various firms, and from 1930 to 1951 was a member of Hawthorn City Council, of which he was mayor from 1948 to 1949. In 1939 he was elected to the Victorian Legislative Assembly for Hawthorn, but he was defeated in 1940.

Tyack served during World War II as an amenities officer in Palestine and New Guinea, and was awarded the MBE in 1945. In 1950, he was re-elected to the seat of Hawthorn, but he lost again in 1952. He was briefly a Hawthorn City councillor again in 1954, but he then became a manager of Sir Arthur Warner's Universal Guarantee Company in Sydney, a position he held until 1963. He remarried, to Marjorie Elizabeth Miers, on 11 April 1953, and died in Sydney in 1970.

Victorian Legislative Assembly
Preceded by John Gray	Member for Hawthorn; 1939–1940	Succeeded by Leslie Hollins
Preceded by Fred Edmunds	Member for Hawthorn; 1950–1952	Succeeded by Charles Murphy
