= Jim Martin (Australian soldier) =

Australian Army soldier

James Martin
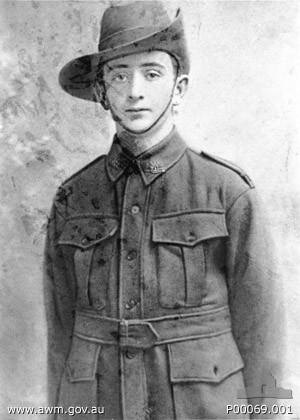
- Studio portrait of Private James Martin
- Born: 3 January 1901; Tocumwal, New South Wales, Australia
- Died: 25 October 1915 (aged 14) off ANZAC Cove, Gallipoli, Ottoman Turkey
- Burial place: At sea
- Military career
- Branch: Australian Imperial Force
- Rank: Private
- Nickname: Jim
- Conflicts: First World War; Gallipoli campaign
- Awards: 1914–15 Star; British War Medal; Victory Medal

James Charles Martin (3 January 1901 – 25 October 1915) was the youngest Australian known to have died in the First World War. He was only 14 years and nine months old when he succumbed to typhoid during the Gallipoli campaign. He was one of 20 Australian soldiers under the age of 18 known to have died in the First World War.

== Early life ==
James Martin was born to Amelia and Charles Martin on 3 January 1901 in Tocumwal, New South Wales. His father was born Charles Marks, in Auckland, New Zealand; however, after emigrating to Australia and settling in Tocumwal, he changed his name to Martin to avoid discrimination for being Jewish. Charles worked as a grocer, handyman and (horse-drawn) cab driver, while Amelia was born in Bendigo in 1876 to Thomas and Frances Park. Her parents had emigrated to Australia during the gold rush in the 1850s. The youngest of twelve children, she married Charles just before her 18th birthday. Martin's family moved to many different suburbs in and around Melbourne before finally settling in Hawthorn in 1910. He was the third of six children, and the only son. He attended Manningtree Road State School from 1910 to 1915, during which time he also received basic military training as a junior cadet under the compulsory training scheme.

== First World War ==
After the outbreak of the First World War, Martin enlisted in the Australian Imperial Force on 12 April 1915, against the wishes of his family. His parents finally agreed however when he made it clear that he would sign on under an assumed name and never write to them if they did not consent. He gave a false date of birth to the recruiting officer, claiming to be 18, when he was actually 14 years and three months. His father had earlier tried to enlist but had been rejected as being too old. Martin joined the 1st Reinforcements of the 21st Battalion as a private and trained in Broadmeadows and Seymour (later Puckapunyal) camps in Victoria before starting to board HMAT Berrima in June 1915 to deploy to Egypt, arriving there in late July.

In late August, following the failed August Offensive, he was sent to Gallipoli on the steamer HMT Southland, to take part in the fighting against the Turks, which had by that time developed into a bloody stalemate. En route, Southland was torpedoed by a German submarine off the island of Lemnos and Martin was rescued after spending four hours in the water. After being picked up, he rejoined his battalion at Mudros Island where they were transferred to the transport ship Abassieh on 7 September to resume their voyage to Gallipoli. The following morning, just before 2:00 am, Martin's platoon, 4 Platoon, landed at Watson's Pier in Anzac Cove. He then served in trenches around Courtney's Post, which was positioned on the ridge overlooking Monash Valley. During this time he wrote to his family telling them that "the Turks are still about 70 yards (64 m) away from us" and asked them not to worry about him as "I am doing splendid over here". Throughout his time in Gallipoli, although his family were writing to him, Martin did not receive any letters from home due to a breakdown in the mail system.

As the campaign dragged on, winter approached and the weather on the Gallipoli Peninsula began to take its toll on the soldiers in the trenches. Following a period of cold temperatures and heavy rain Martin contracted enteric fever in the trenches. After suffering mild symptoms for about a fortnight during which time he refused treatment, he was subsequently evacuated to the hospital ship Glenart Castle on 25 October 1915 after he developed diarrhoea. He died of heart failure that night, at the age of 14 and nine months, and was buried at sea the next day. At the time of his death only Martin's parents and his best friend, Cec Hogan—who was himself only 16—knew Martin's real age. Nevertheless, on 18 December 1915, Melbourne's Herald newspaper reported Martin's death in an article titled "Youngest Soldier Dies". Although he was the youngest known AIF soldier killed during the war, Martin was likely not the youngest soldier to have enlisted. Albert Dunnicliff is believed to have enlisted a week before his 14th birthday, and served for 16 months, including a period on the Western Front, before being discharged.

== Honours and awards ==
Martin was awarded the 1914–15 Star, the British War Medal, and the Victory Medal. His name is recorded on the Lone Pine Memorial to the missing at Gallipoli, and on the Australian War Memorial's Roll of Honour in Canberra.
