= Mrs Percy Russell =

Australian philanthropist (1870–1938)

Mrs Percy Russell OBE (5 April 1870 – 16 February 1938) was an Australian philanthropist, remembered for her work with the Australian Red Cross.

== History ==
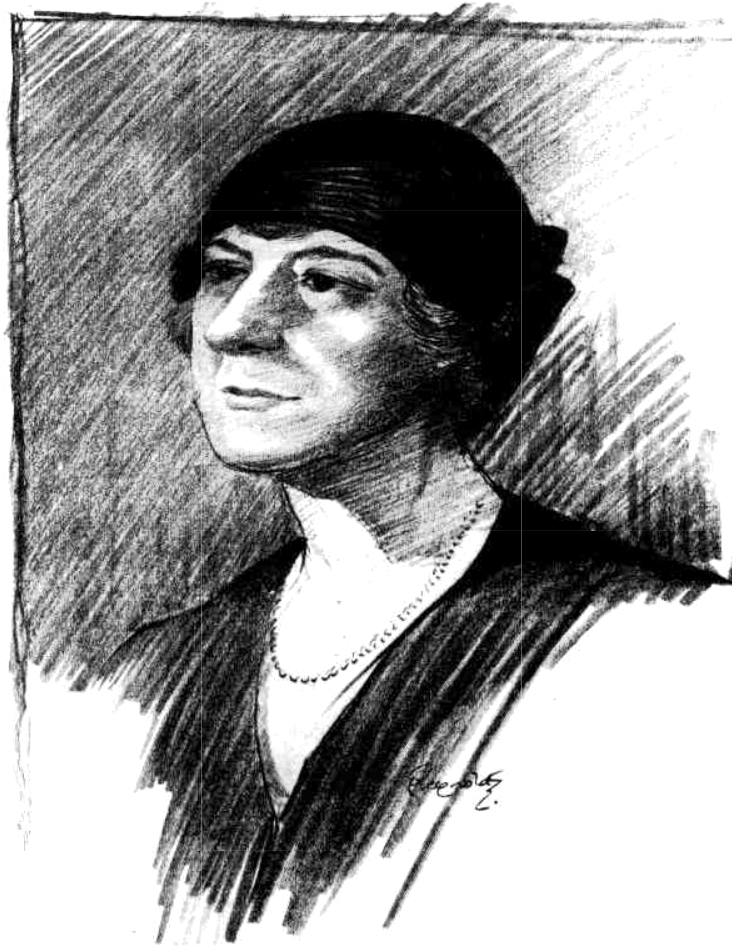
1930 portrait by L. F. Reynolds

Russell was born Delia Constance Law, eldest daughter of James D. Law, general manager of the Bank of Victoria in Melbourne.

During the First World War she helped establish Red Cross kitchen on St Kilda Road, and managed its operation through the War and the great influenza epidemic which followed. She saw the Society develop from a small coterie to a vast organisation of some 45,000 to 50,000 members. She was also involved in the V.A.D. and Junior Red Cross. She remained a member of the Victorian council of the Red Cross Society for the rest of her life.

In 1923 she married solicitor Percy Joseph Russell on 7 October 1923. As mayoress of Hawthorn, she was instrumental in founding the Talbot Colony for Epileptics, and remained a supporter of the charity.

She was a lifelong committee member of the Women's Hospital and its president 1932–1934.

She supported the Victorian Almoners' Association and the Playgrounds Association, and was a member of the Women's Centenary Council.

== Other interests ==
A dedicated music lover, she was a member of the Melbourne Music Club and other societies.

== Recognition ==
In 1920 Russell was awarded the Order of the British Empire.

She died after a long illness.

== Family ==
Delia Constance Law married solicitor Percy Joseph Russell on 7 October 1923. They had one son, L. Russell.
