= John Austin Gray =

Australian politician

Member of the Victorian Legislative Assembly for Hawthorn
- In office 27 September 1930 – 6 May 1939
- Preceded by: William McPherson
- Succeeded by: Les Tyack

Personal details
- Born: 16 April 1892 Warracknabeal, Victoria
- Died: 6 May 1939 (aged 47) Hawthorn, Victoria
- Party: Nationalist (1930–31); UAP (1931–39)
- Spouse: Jessie Millicent Harris
- Relations: Children: Gwenda, Hugh, Marjorie and Patty
- Nickname: Jack

Military service
- Allegiance: Australia
- Branch/service: Australian Army
- Years of service: 1914–1919
- Rank: Lieutenant
- Battles/wars: First World War
- Awards: Military Cross

John Austin Gray MC (16 April 1892 – 6 May 1939) was an Australian politician.

Gray was born in Warracknabeal to storekeeper Archibald Gray and Hannah Isabella Hutchinson. He attended state schools before working for the State Savings Bank of Victoria. During the First World War he served with the 6th Light Trench Mortar Battery, being awarded the Military Cross. On his return he became an accountant. On 3 November 1920 he married Jessie Millicent Harris, with whom he had four children. He served on Hawthorn City Council from 1927 to 1939 and was mayor from 1937 to 1938. A founding member and president of the Young Nationalists, he won a by-election for the Victorian Legislative Assembly seat of Hawthorn in September 1930. He was briefly a minister without portfolio from 20 May 1935 to 2 April 1935. Gray held his seat until his death in Hawthorn in 1939.

Victorian Legislative Assembly
| Preceded by William McPherson | Member for Hawthorn; 1930–1939 | Succeeded by Les Tyack |
