= Walter Jona =

Australian politician

- Born: 17 July 1926
- Died: 22 July 2007 (aged 81)
- Education: Scotch College, Melbourne; University of Melbourne
- Occupation: Australian politician
- Years active: 1964–1985
- Known for: member, Victorian Legislative Assembly
- Political party: Liberal Party
- Relatives: Lady (Anna) Cowen (cousin)

Walter Jona (17 July 1926 – 22 July 2007) was a Liberal Party member of the Victorian Legislative Assembly.

== Personal life ==
Jona went to school at the Scotch College, Melbourne before studying medicine at the University of Melbourne in 1944, and before he went to Scotch College Melbourne he went to Glenferrie Primary School. After spending 1945 in the Royal Australian Air Force, Jona returned to his medical course, but found his passion for politics after taking some politics units. This lead Jona to joining the Melbourne University Liberal Club and becoming active within the Liberal Party in his local area.

Jona was also active in many other groups including the Melbourne Apex Club, Melbourne Junior Chamber of Commerce and in 1958 he became President of the Victorian Association of Jewish Ex-Servicemen. Jona also served as President of the Hawthorn City Band from 1973 to 1988, overseeing the band win the Australian National Band Championships A-Grade competition eight times.

Until his death in 2007, he remained active in community life, serving as chairman for the Victorian Union for Progressive Judaism and as a patron of the Hawthorn Football Club.

Lady (Anna) Cowen, wife of Sir Zelman Cowen, a former Governor-General of Australia, is his cousin.

== Political career ==
In the lead up to the 1964 state election, Peter Garrisson, the Liberal member for Jona's local seat of Hawthorn was disendorsed because he was charged under the Companies Act. Jona won a hotly contested preselection against ten other candidates, and went on to win the seat despite challenges from Garrisson and from Labor (at the time, the seat of Hawthorn included parts of working class Richmond, making it less secure for the Liberals than today).

Jona served as the Chairman of a Select Committee on Road Safety between 1967 and 1973. This committee recommended the mandatory wearing of seatbelts in 1971, which was a world first.

From 1973 to 1976 Jona served as Parliamentary Secretary to cabinet before being promoted by Premier Rupert Hamer to be Victoria's first Ethnic Affairs Minister. From 1979 until the Liberals' defeat at the 1982 election, Jona served as Minister for Community Welfare Services. He also served as shadow Education Minister until his retirement in 1985.

Like many Liberal Party politicians from Victoria, Jona's political views were considered to be small-l liberal. After retirement, Jona criticized the government of Joh Bjelke-Petersen for its "contempt of parliament" and "exercising [of] absolute power" as well as criticizing the current federal Coalition government for its increasingly centralist style of government. .
