= Electoral district of Hawthorn =

State electoral district of Victoria, Australia

Hawthorn Victoria—Legislative Assembly
- Interactive map of electoral district boundaries from the 2022 state election
- State: Victoria
- Created: 1889
- MP: John Pesutto
- Party: Liberal
- Namesake: Hawthorn
- Electors: 44,828 (2018)
- Area: 21 km^{2} (8.1 sq mi)
- Demographic: Inner metropolitan
- Coordinates: 37°50′S 145°03′E
Electorates around Hawthorn:
Richmond	Kew	Box Hill
Richmond	Hawthorn	Box Hill
Malvern	Ashwood	Ashwood

Hawthorn is an electoral district of the Victorian Legislative Assembly. It was first proclaimed in 1888, taking effect at the 1899 election.

The seat is located in eastern Melbourne and is centred on the suburbs of Hawthorn and Hawthorn East. It also includes Camberwell and parts of Canterbury, Glen Iris, and Surrey Hills.

== History ==
Hawthorn has usually been a safe seat for the Liberal Party and its predecessors, having been held by a number of leaders and senior ministers. In the 1960s, the seat of Hawthorn included parts of working class Richmond, making it less secure for the Liberals than in recent decades.

With the exception of two occasions when Liberal MPs defected and sat as independents, it has only been held by non-Liberal MPs three times in its history: independent Leslie Hollins from 1940 to 1945, Labor-turned-Labor (Anti-Communist) MP Charles Murphy from 1952 to 1955, and Labor MP John Kennedy in 2018.

Kennedy's victory over Liberal MP John Pesutto at the 2018 state election was considered a shock, with Guardian Australia saying he had "little chance" going into the election. Pesutto was a panelist on ABC on election night when he was told on live television that he had lost his seat.

Pesutto re-contested Hawthorn at the 2022 state election, defeating Kennedy and teal independent candidate Melissa Lowe. He is the current member, as well as a former leader of the Victorian Liberal Party.

Notable former members for Hawthorn include former premiers Sir William McPherson and Ted Baillieu, as well as Walter Jona, a minister in the Hamer government.

== Members for Hawthorn ==
Image	Member	Party	Term	Notes
	Charles Taylor (1849–1898)	Liberal	1 April 1889 – 1 September 1894	
	Robert Murray Smith (1831–1921)	Conservative	1 October 1894 – 1 October 1900	
	Robert Barbour (1845–1914)	Liberal	1 November 1900 – 1901	
	Robert Barbour (1845–1914)	Ministerialist	1901 – 1 September 1902	
	George Swinburne (1861–1928)	Ministerialist	1 October 1902 – 1907	
	George Swinburne (1861–1928)	Independent	1907 – 1911	
	George Swinburne (1861–1928)	Liberal	1911 – 31 July 1913	
	William Murray McPherson (1865–1932)	Liberal	1 September 1913 – 1916	Premier of Victoria from 1928 until 1929
	William Murray McPherson (1865–1932)	Economy	1916 – 1917	Premier of Victoria from 1928 until 1929
	William Murray McPherson (1865–1932)	Nationalist	1917 – 1 August 1930	Premier of Victoria from 1928 until 1929
	John Austin Gray (1892–1939)	Nationalist	27 September 1930 – 15 September 1931	Died in office
	John Austin Gray (1892–1939)	United Australia	15 September 1931 – 6 May 1939	Died in office
	Les Tyack (1899–1970)	United Australia	10 June 1939 – 16 March 1940	Won by-election
	Leslie Hollins (1897–1984)	Independent	16 March 1940 – 10 November 1945	
	Fred Edmunds (1901–1985)	Liberal	10 November 1945 – 22 March 1949	Suspended (then expelled) from LCP party room for disloyalty. Briefly expelled as LCP member but readmitted and contested 1950 election without endorsement. Lost seat
	Fred Edmunds (1901–1985)	Liberal and Country	22 March 1949 – 10 February 1950	Suspended (then expelled) from LCP party room for disloyalty. Briefly expelled as LCP member but readmitted and contested 1950 election without endorsement. Lost seat
	Fred Edmunds (1901–1985)	Independent Liberal	10 February 1950 – 31 March 1950	Suspended (then expelled) from LCP party room for disloyalty. Briefly expelled as LCP member but readmitted and contested 1950 election without endorsement. Lost seat
	Fred Edmunds (1901–1985)	Independent	31 March 1950 – 1 April 1950	Suspended (then expelled) from LCP party room for disloyalty. Briefly expelled as LCP member but readmitted and contested 1950 election without endorsement. Lost seat
	Fred Edmunds (1901–1985)	Independent Liberal	1 April 1950 – 13 May 1950	Suspended (then expelled) from LCP party room for disloyalty. Briefly expelled as LCP member but readmitted and contested 1950 election without endorsement. Lost seat
	Les Tyack (1899–1970)	Liberal	13 May 1950 – 6 December 1952	
	Charles Murphy (1909–1997)	Labor	6 December 1952 – 30 March 1955	
	Charles Murphy (1909–1997)	Labor (Anti-Communist)	30 March 1955 – 27 May 1955	
	Jim Manson (1908–1974)	Liberal	27 May 1955 – 31 May 1958	
	Peter Garrisson (1923–2013)	Liberal	31 May 1958 – 1963	
	Peter Garrisson (1923–2013)	Independent	1963 – 27 June 1964	
	Walter Jona (1926–2007)	Liberal	27 June 1964 – 2 March 1985	
	Phil Gude (1941–)	Liberal	2 March 1985 – 18 September 1999	Deputy Liberal leader from 1991–1999
	Ted Baillieu (1953–)	Liberal	18 September 1999 – 29 November 2014	Premier of Victoria from 2010 until 2013
	John Pesutto (1970–)	Liberal	29 November 2014 – 24 November 2018	Lost seat
	John Kennedy (1947–)	Labor	24 November 2018 – 26 November 2022	Lost seat
	John Pesutto (1970–)	Liberal	26 November 2022 – present	Leader of the Opposition from 2022 until 2024. Incumbent

== Election results ==
2022 Victorian state election: Hawthorn
Party	Candidate	Votes	%	±%
Liberal	John Pesutto	18,728	42.3	−1.8
Labor	John Kennedy	9,799	22.1	−10.9
Independent	Melissa Lowe	8,851	20.0	+20.0
Greens	Nick Savage	4,927	11.1	−6.4
Animal Justice	Faith Fuhrer	660	1.5	−0.7
Liberal Democrats	Richard Peppard	583	1.3	+1.3
Family First	Ken Triantafillis	408	0.9	+0.9
Democratic Labour	Stratton Bell	354	0.8	+0.8
Total formal votes		44,310	97.4	+1.0
Informal votes		1,178	2.6	−1.0
Turnout		45,488	90.8	+1.2
Two-party-preferred result
Liberal	John Pesutto	22,927	51.7	+2.3
Labor	John Kennedy	21,383	48.3	–2.3
Liberal gain from Labor		Swing	+2.3	
