= George Swinburne =

Australian politician

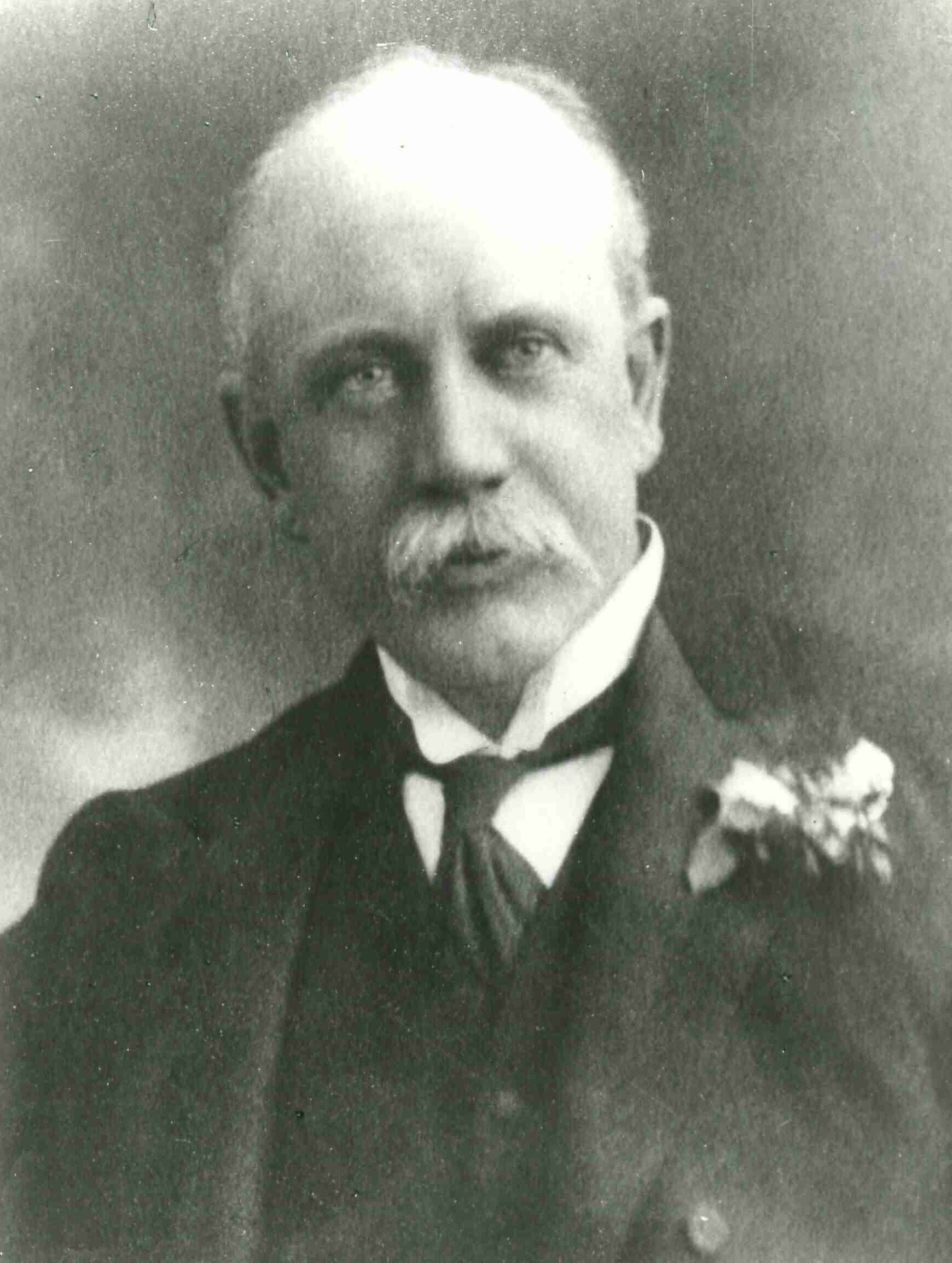

Member of the Victorian Legislative Assembly for Hawthorn
- In office 1 October 1902 – 31 July 1913
- Preceded by: Robert Barbour
- Succeeded by: William Murray McPherson

Personal details
- Born: 3 February 1861 Paradise, Tyne and Wear, England, United Kingdom
- Died: 4 September 1928 (aged 67) Melbourne, Victoria, Australia
- Spouse: Ethel "Sydney" Hamer (m. 1890)
- Children: Four daughters
- Occupation: Engineer; politician; philanthropist
- Known for: Swinburne University

George Swinburne (3 February 1861 – 4 September 1928) was an Australian engineer, politician and philanthropist. He founded the institution which later became Swinburne University of Technology.

== Early life and background ==
Swinburne was born at Paradise, near Newcastle-on-Tyne, England, son of Mark William Swinburne, and his wife Jane née Coates. His father was a draughtsman in the Armstrong works at Elswick, working for a salary of 27 shillings a week. Later, his father established his own business in 1892 as a brass-founder, engineer, and coppersmith and married Jane Coates in 1860.

George Swinburne was educated at the Royal Grammar School, Newcastle, and in 1874 was apprenticed to chemical merchants, J. Williamson & Co., and was appointed as a clerk in the same business (1880–82), and, in evening classes, studied engineering, shorthand and German before beginning work in the morning, and joined a debating society. On Sundays Swinburne taught a class in a Methodist Sunday school; he had music lessons and was an avid reader.

== Engineering career ==
=== In England ===
In September 1882 Swinburne went to London, finding employment in the gas and mechanical engineering business of his uncle, John Coates. In April 1885, Swinburne was taken into partnership and was able to put £300 of his own savings into the business. Swinburne's chief recreation was music and in June 1885 he was one of the choristers at the Handel festival held in the Crystal Palace. Politically, Swinburne was an ardent Gladstonian Liberal, in 1886 he became election agent for the Liberal candidate for St Pancras South, Sir Julian Goldsmid, 3rd Baronet, who was elected after a strenuous campaign. Swinburne found electioneering a great strain, "a game not worth playing—ended in weariness, sleepless nights and restless days". In December 1885 Coates had gone to Melbourne to start a business, Swinburne was left in charge in London. Coates found the prospects so good that Swinburne followed him and arrived in November 1886.

=== In Australia ===
Swinburne's role was to secure contracts for erecting gas plants for the firm of John Coates and Company. In 1887 the Melbourne Hydraulic Power Company was formed, supplying power to city buildings. In 1888 a similar company was established in Sydney. Swinburne was engineer and manager of the Melbourne company until 1897 and visited England in 1891 and withdrew most of his capital from Melbourne to help his father and brother to start a business; in doing so he practically escaped the effects the demise of the land boom and the resultant bank crisis of 1893. Swinburne visited the United States and Europe in 1897 to study the development of electricity in competition with gas and he decided that each would have its own place.

== Political career ==
Swinburne was elected a member of the Hawthorn municipal council in 1898 and in 1902 became mayor. In the same year, he was elected as the Member for Hawthorn in the Victorian Legislative Assembly, and sat as a supporter of W. H. Irvine. There had been a severe drought in Australia and the policy speech foreshadowed "important works for the conservation and distribution of water in the arid areas". The earlier experiments initiated by Alfred Deakin had not really been successful, and it was clear that their organization and principles would need careful revision. Swinburne had studied Victorian irrigation and realised the huge cost of storing the winter and spring rains for use summer; he believed that water charges should take the form of a rate payable, not only by those who used the water, but by all whose land was benefitted by irrigation. In November 1903 Irvine's health was so seriously affected by over-work that he was compelled to resign the premiership, and Thomas Bent who succeeded him gave Swinburne the portfolio of Minister of Water Supply (1904–08). At the time of his appointment, Swinburne was in England and he collected all the available literature on the subject and studied it on the voyage out. Following visits to irrigation sites with government officials, Swinburne coordinated the drafting of the water bill from June 1904 that involved the appointment of the State Rivers and Water Supply Commission of Victoria to undertake the control and management of all Victoria's water supply. On its first attempt, the bill passed through the Assembly however, was rejected by the Victorian Legislative Council and following some amendments, the bill was finally passed enacted in 1905; said by some to be Swinburne's greatest achievement.

Swinburne was appointed as the Minister for Agriculture in November 1904 and stressed the department's role to educate farmers. He was partially responsible for establishing academic chairs in agricultural science and veterinary science at The University of Melbourne, although the latter chair was subsequently abandoned. Swinburne was involved in the Murray River water-sharing arrangement, his draft agreement of 1906 was remarkably close to that finally accepted in 1915. In 1907 Bent visited England and Swinburne was leader of the Assembly during his absence. After Bent's return the ministry's position weakened, and Swinburne and four other ministers resigned on 31 October 1908. During the negotiations for the reconstruction of the ministry, an advance was made to Swinburne to take over the leadership of the party, and Bent offered to retire in his favour, but Swinburne, weary from overwork, could see no way of reconciling the conflicting interests in the party and declined the offer.

Swinburne also felt the strain of a censure motion that was moved in September, subsequently defeated by a large majority. Severe attacks by The Age were made on his probity and Swinburne successfully took legal action and in 1909 and was awarded £3,250 in damages and costs. The Age was unsuccessful of appeal on tow occasions in higher courts.

== Post-political career ==
On 31 July 1913 Swinburne retired from parliament to become a member of the Inter-State Commission appointed by the Australian government. A host of matters was referred to the commission, and Swinburne thought it right to resign from all his directorates and practically abandon the business career in which he had been so successful. Much work was done by the commission and it is due to a suggestion made by this body that the "Advisory Council of Science and Industry" (later to become the Commonwealth Scientific and Industrial Research Organisation) was eventually established. However, a reduction of powers of the commission after a judgment of the High Court resulted in Swinburne's decision to resign. During World War I, Swinburne was chairman of the board of business administration of the Defence Department, and later was civil and finance member of the military board. In 1919 when the electricity commission was instituted, Swinburne was appointed one of the four commissioners, with Sir John Monash as chairman. Swinburne resigned this position in 1925, when most of the initial difficulties of using brown coal for power generation had been surmounted.

At the 1922 federal election, he unsuccessfully sought election to the Senate.

Swinburne was a driving force in the establishment of the Eastern Suburbs Technical College at Hawthorn, and contributed over £15,000 to sustaining its future. Later, the college was renamed as the Swinburne Technical College, Swinburne Institute of Technology, and in 1992 it became the Swinburne University of Technology, now shortened as Swinburne University. Swinburne became a member of the council of public instruction after he left state politics, and especially encouraged decentralisation and technical education.

He served on the Council of The University of Melbourne and was a trustee of the State Library of Victoria and the National Gallery of Victoria, and became president of the Gallery trustees in April 1928. The same year, he was elected to the Victorian Legislative Council. On 4 September 1928 he was in his place in the Council chamber when he suddenly collapsed and died.

== Personal life ==
Swinburne was over six feet (180 cm) in height, thin, slightly angular. He was only a few years in parliament, but the influence of his work was felt long-term.

Swinburne was a modest man and a lifelong Methodist with strong Christian principles; for example, at his home, no games were played on Sundays. On 17 February 1890, Swinburne married Ethel Hamer, the daughter of Rev. D. J. Hamer, a former Minister of the Collins Street Independent Church. The couple spent most of their life living at Shenton in Hawthorn. He was survived by his wife and their four daughters. His second daughter, Gwendolen Hamer Swinburne, published A Source Book of Australian History (1919), and Womanhood in the Life of the Nations (1923).

Swinburne's bust by Paul Montford is at the National Gallery of Victoria.

Victorian Legislative Assembly
Preceded by Robert Barbour	Member for Hawthorn; 1902–1913	Succeeded by William McPherson
Political offices
Preceded by Donald McLeod	Minister for Water Supply; 1904–1908	Succeeded by Alfred Downward
Preceded by John Murray	Minister for Agriculture; 1904–1908	Succeeded by Alfred Downward
