= Percy Joseph Russell =

Australian politician (1861–1946)

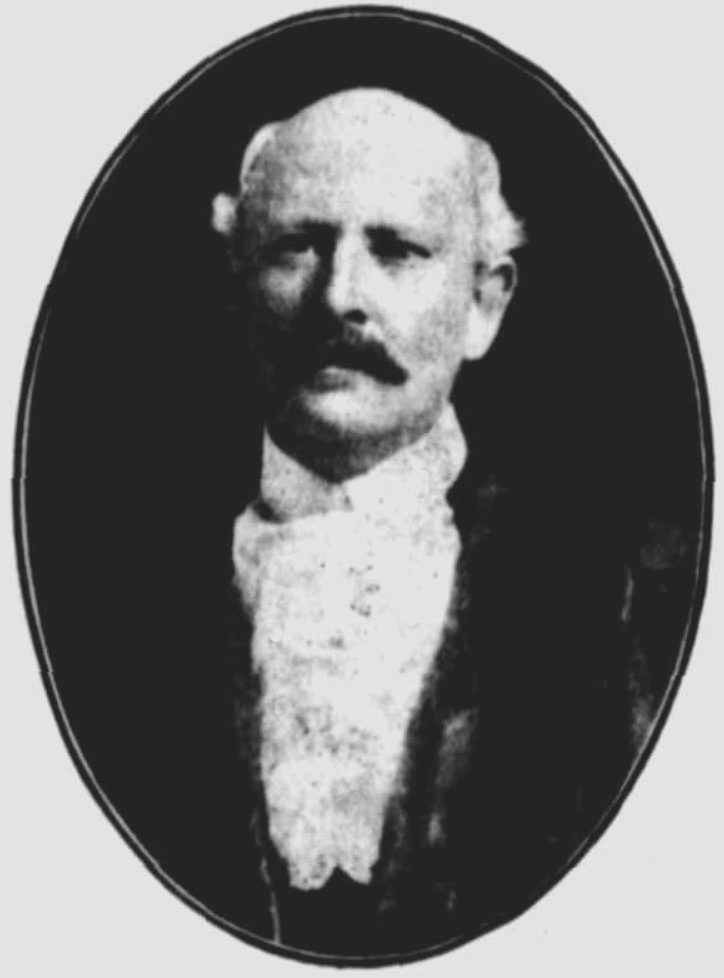

29th, 41st & 51st Mayor of Hawthorn
- In office 1894–1895
- Preceded by: Robert Hooke
- Succeeded by: Robert Barbour
- In office 1905–1906
- Preceded by: William Andrews
- Succeeded by: Charles Dalley
- In office 1915–1917
- Preceded by: Edward Rigby
- Succeeded by: Robert Lord

Personal details
- Born: 16 December 1861 Serpentine Station, Victoria, Australia
- Died: 24 September 1946 (aged 84) Sassafras, Victoria, Australia

Percy Joseph Russell (16 December 1861 – 24 September 1946) was an Australian politician who served as the mayor of Hawthorn.

Russell's father was Robert Russell, an English-born pastoralist who worked on the Serpentine station, and his mother was Maria Ievers McDonough who was born in Ireland. He was born at Serpentine station in 1861 and educated at Hawthorn Grammar and Wesley College.

On 1 June 1887 Russell became a licensed attorney, solicitor and proctor of the Supreme Court of Victoria and he received a large amount of work associated with the Melbourne land boom. In March 1890 he was elected as a councillor for Hawthorn unopposed and he held the position until August 1919. He was elected Mayor of Hawthorn for three terms in 1893, 1905, 1915, and 1916, and served as President of the Municipal Association of Victoria from 1904 to 1919. In 1893 he married Delia Constance Law and they had a son. In 1917 he was nominated to run for the seat of East Yarra in the Victorian Legislative Council.

Russell died in Sassafras in 1946 and was buried in Boroondara Cemetery.
