= Jim Manson (politician) =

Australian politician

James Williamson Manson (31 March 1908 – 30 August 1974) was a Scottish-born Australian politician.

Manson was born in Glasgow to drapery buyer Andrew Manson and Margaret Cranston Williamson Minto. He was educated in Scotland and worked for the cotton manufacturers J. & P. Coats Ltd, settling in Sydney in 1935. He served in the military during World War II, and on 12 September 1942 married Daphne Ruby Haines, with whom he had four children. He moved to Victoria, where he was public relations officer for the Liberal Party from 1949 to 1955.

In 1955 Manson was elected to the Victorian Legislative Assembly for Hawthorn, transferring to Ringwood in 1958. He was cabinet secretary from 1964 to 1965, a minister without portfolio from September to December 1965, Minister for State Development from 1965 to 1970, and Minister for Tourism from February to June 1970. Manson retired in 1973 and died at Heathmont in 1974.

Victorian Legislative Assembly
Preceded by Charles Murphy	Member for Hawthorn; 1955–1958	Succeeded by Peter Garrisson
New seat	Member for Ringwood; 1958–1973	Succeeded by Norman Lacy
