= Glenferrie Primary School =

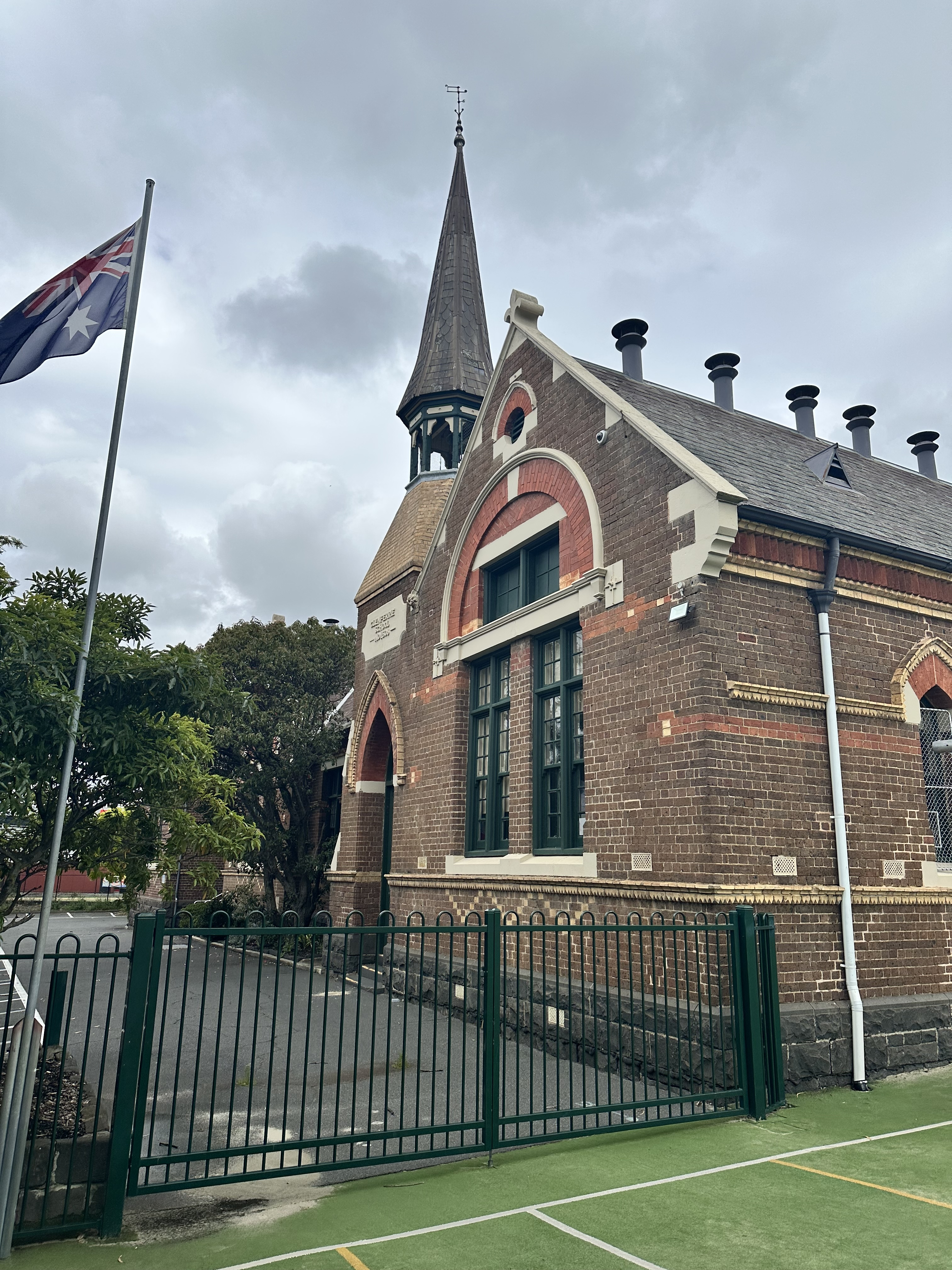

Location
- 78 - 98 Manningtree Road, Hawthorn, Victoria, Australia; 37°49′27″S 145°02′02″E

Information
- Former name: Manningtree Road School
- Type: Public
- Established: 1875; 151 years ago
- Principal: Tanya Gurney
- Years offered: Prep–Year 6
- Enrolment: 245 (2025)
- Website: glenferrieps.vic.edu.au

History
- Built: 1877

Site notes
- Architectural style: Victorian Gothic

Victorian Heritage Register
- Official name: Glenferrie Primary School (Primary School No. 1508)
- Type: Registered Place
- Designated: 20 August 1982
- Reference no.: VHR H1630
- Heritage overlay no.: HO095
- Category: Education

Glenferrie Primary School is a heritage-listed public co-educational primary school located in the Melbourne suburb of Hawthorn, Victoria, Australia. Established in 1875, the school opened in its current location 1877. It has also been known as the Hawthorn School, Manningtree Road School and Central School. In 1924 the school name was officially changed to Glenferrie State School. It is administered by the Victorian Department of Education with an enrolment of 245 students as of 2025.

The school was added to the Victorian Heritage Register on 20 August 1982 for its historical and architectural significance.

== History ==
The school opened in the Wesleyan Church Hall in Burwood Road in on 22 February 1875 with 300 pupils enrolled. The school moved to its current location in March 1877. To accommodate increasing enrolments extensions to the school were made in 1881 and 1887 with enrolments of nearly 900 by 1888. An infant school, consisting of six classrooms, a hall and sewered toilets, was opened in 1907.

The handcraft-based sloyd system was introduced to the school around 1907 and was initially housed in the infant school. Sloyd teachers were trained at the school and pupils came from neighbouring schools. An exhibition of sloyd handworks was held at the school in 1910 at which time there were 100 pupils enrolled in the sloyd class. A dedicated, stand-alone sloyd room was built in 1924 and opened by the then Minister of Education, Sir Alexander Peacock.

The school is historically significant and is a largely intact example of late nineteenth and early twentieth century school architecture. The original building is one of the most intact Victorian Gothic-style schools in Victoria, the sloyd room is one of the few remaining in the state, and the Federation arched shelter shed is possibly the only one remaining in the state.

The youngest Australian known to have died in World War I, James Martin, attended the school between 1910 and 1915; and one of the school houses was subsequently named in his honour. Part of the school was turned into a hospital during the influenza epidemic of 1919 with room for up to 100 beds.

In 1920, a needlework school was opened drawing pupils from surrounding schools and in 1938 a rural training school was opened. The sloyd centre, needlework centre, rural school and a cookery school (that had relocated from Swinburne Technical College) were all still in operation in 1969.

In 2014, the school was the subject of media attention with a report of an eight-year-old girl being attacked in the grounds of the school while waiting for her parents. The report was subsequently found to have been false.

== See also ==
- Education in Victoria
- List of government schools in Victoria, Australia
- List of places on the Victorian Heritage Register in the City of Boroondara
