= Shenton House, Victoria =

Heritage-listed house in Melbourne, Victoria, Australia

Shenton
- Location of the house in Greater Metropolitan Melbourne

General information
- Status: Completed
- Type: House (1890–1963); Migrant reception centre (1963–c. 1980s); House (since c. 1980s– )
- Location: 41 Kinkora Road, Hawthorn, City of Boroondara, Melbourne, Victoria, Australia
- Coordinates: 37°48′59″S 145°02′03″E
- Completed: 1890; 136 years ago
- Owner: John Shenton Gordon (1890–1897); Ethel and George Swinburne (1897–1963); Australian Department of Immigration (1963–c. 1980s); anor. (since c. 1980s)

Technical details
- Material: Red bricks; slate; timber
- Floor area: 491 m^{2} (5,290 sq ft)
- Grounds: 3,791 m^{2} (40,810 sq ft)

Design and construction
- Architecture firm: Reed, Smart and Tappin (attrib.)

Victorian Heritage Register
- Official name: Shenton
- Type: Registered place
- Designated: 20 August 1982
- Reference no.: VHR H0788
- Heritage overlay no.: HO77
- Category: Residential buildings (private)

Register of the National Estate
- Official name: Shenton and Garden
- Type: Defunct register
- Designated: undated
- Reference no.: 19920

Shenton is a house located at 41 Kinkora Road in Hawthorn, in the City of Boroondara, in the inner eastern suburbs of Melbourne, in Victoria, Australia.

Built in 1890 on the traditional lands of the Wurundjeri people, the house was added to the Victorian Heritage Register on 20 August 1982 in recognition of its historical and architectural significance; and was also added to the non-statutory and now defunct Register of the National Estate on an unknown date.

== History ==
Shenton was built in 1890 for the coal, chaff, and grain merchant John Shenton Gordon, on a subdivision of the Kinkora Estate.

In 1897, the house was purchased by George Swinburne, a prominent engineer, founder of the Melbourne Hydrauilic Co., commercial entrepreneur, politician and member of the Victorian Legislative Assembly. Together with his wife, Ethel, Swinburne was an advocate of technical education in Victoria. Their support enabled the opening of the Eastern Suburbs Technical School in 1908 (later the Swinburne Institute of Technology) and in the 1916 the opening of the first technical school for girls in Australia as a branch of the school. The Swinburne family occupied the house until its sale in 1963 to the Australian Department of Immigration for use as an migrant reception centre.

Set on 3,791 square metres (40,810 sq ft), the five bedroom house with three bathrooms, and space for five cars with a swimming pool, sold in 1999 for A$3.2 million.

== Description ==
Shenton is a two-storey mansion executed in red brick with restrained cream dressings. The roof is slate, and the main roof is integrated with the verandah roof. Prominent gable ends dominate the design with Gothic embellishment. A heavy timber verandah incorporates turned posts and fretwork brackets. The windows are particularly plain. The main gabled wing projects from the body of the house, and the adjoining verandah recedes to one side. On the opposite, an elaborate side entrance includes a shingled oriel to the first floor. The house is set in substantial grounds. Its design is attributed on stylistic grounds to Reed, Smart and Tappin.

The house is significant for the early use of red brick on an experimental mansion form; and is of outstanding significance for its long association with George Swinburne.

== See also ==
- Architecture of Melbourne
- List of places on the Victorian Heritage Register in the City of Boroondara
