= William Murray McPherson =

Australian politician (1865–1932)

Sir William McPherson KBE

31st Premier of Victoria
- In office 22 November 1928 – 12 December 1929
- Preceded by: Edmond Hogan
- Succeeded by: Edmond Hogan

Personal details
- Born: 17 September 1865 West Melbourne, Victoria, Australia
- Died: 26 July 1932 (aged 66) Melbourne, Victoria, Australia
- Resting place: Boroondara General Cemetery
- Party: Nationalist Party of Australia
- Spouse: Emily Jackson

Sir William Murray McPherson, KBE (17 September 1865 – 26 July 1932) was an Australian philanthropist and politician. He was the 31st Premier of Victoria.

== Early life and philanthropy ==
He was born in West Melbourne, the son of a prosperous Scottish-born merchant, and worked in his father's business, eventually becoming sole proprietor and managing director of McPherson's, a leading machinery firm. A very wealthy man by the early years of the 20th century, he was president of the Melbourne Chamber of Commerce 1907–1909. In 1892 he married Emily Jackson, with whom he had three children. In 1927 he donated £25,000 to found the Emily McPherson School of Domestic Economy, named for his wife (today, as Emily McPherson College, it is part of RMIT University). He also funded the Jessie McPherson section (named for his mother) of the now-demolished Queen Victoria Hospital. His son, W. E. McPherson, gifted Invergowrie to the Headmistresses' Association that created a hostel for girls in 1933. May Isabella Weatherly moved the homecraft hostel there to train future homemakers.

== Politics ==
McPherson was elected to the Victorian Legislative Assembly for the seat of Hawthorn in 1913. He was Treasurer in the Nationalist governments of John Bowser and Harry Lawson from 1917 to 1923, and developed a reputation as a very conservative manager of the state's finances. It was McPherson's refusal to provide funds for pensions for members of the Victoria Police that sparked the 1923 Victorian Police strike. He was appointed a Knight Commander of the Order of the British Empire (KBE) in 1923 for service as Treasurer.

=== Premier of Victoria ===
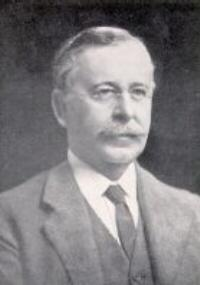
McPherson as premier

In 1927 McPherson succeeded Alexander Peacock as leader of the Nationalist Party. In November 1928 he moved a vote of no confidence against Ned Hogan's minority Labor Party government, which had lost the support of the independent members who were keeping it in office, and as a result he became Premier. His Cabinet included two bright young Nationalist politicians who were destined for higher things: Robert Menzies and Wilfrid Kent Hughes. But in July 1929 both these men joined a Cabinet revolt over McPherson's uncharacteristic agreement to offer an open-ended subsidy to rural meat-freezing works (this was a bid to win over rural independent MPs).

As a result of this and similar examples of unsustained government spending to buy off rural interest groups, Victoria by 1929 had amassed a public debt of over a million pounds, a huge amount at the time. This provoked McPherson into proposing cuts to public spending, which in turn led the country members who held the balance of power to withdraw their support from McPherson's government. As a result, he called an election at which the Nationalists won 17 seats and the Country Party 11, while Labor won 30, with seven independents.

== Later life ==
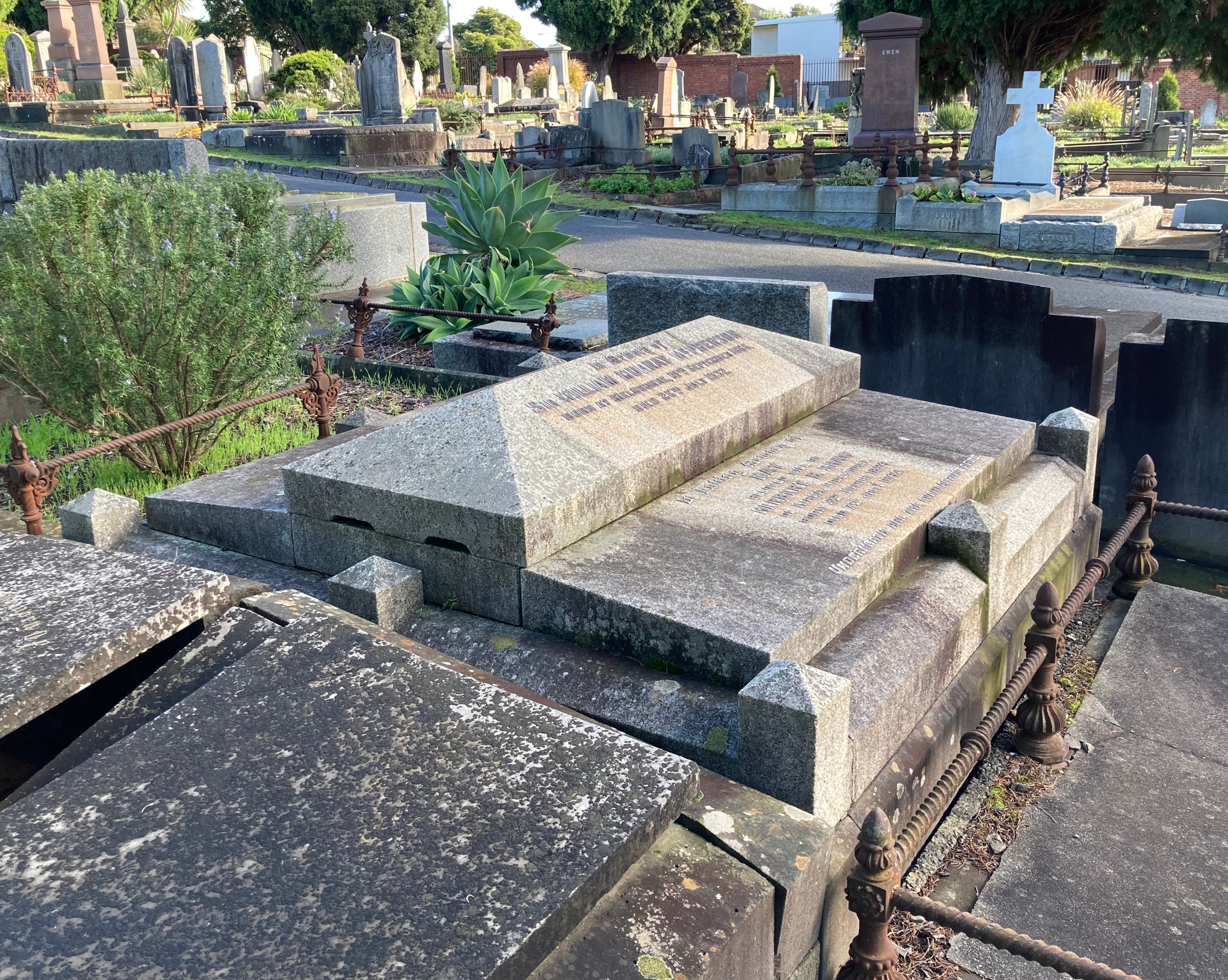
McPherson's grave at Boroondara General Cemetery

McPherson refused to resign, but was defeated in a vote of no confidence when the new Parliament met in December. Hogan then formed a new government. McPherson resigned as Nationalist leader, and from politics, in August 1930. A by-election for his seat was held on 27 September 1930.

He died suddenly in July 1932, aged 66, and was buried at Boroondara General Cemetery.

Victorian Legislative Assembly
Preceded by George Swinburne	Member for Hawthorn; 1913–1930	Succeeded by John Gray
Political offices
Preceded by Sir Alexander Peacock	Treasurer of Victoria; 1917–1923	Succeeded by Harry Lawson
Preceded by Edmond Hogan	Leader of the Opposition; 1927–1928	Succeeded by Edmond Hogan
Preceded by Edmond Hogan	Premier of Victoria; 1928–1929	Succeeded by Edmond Hogan
Preceded by Edmond Hogan	Leader of the Opposition; 1929–1930	Succeeded by Sir Stanley Argyle
Party political offices
Preceded by Sir Alexander Peacock	Leader of the Nationalist Party in Victoria; 1927–1930	Succeeded by Sir Stanley Argyle
