= Peter Garrisson =

Australian politician (1923–2013)

Peter Wolseley Garrisson (18 March 1923 – 20 April 2013) was an Australian politician.

He was born in Cremorne to American-born builder John Garrisson and Mina Dean Scott. He was educated in Sydney and worked for the Shell Oil Company before serving in the AIF during World War II. He worked for Shell in western New South Wales before becoming a director with Colliers Transport in 1949 and of Garrisson Motors from 1950.

In 1958 he was elected to the Victorian Legislative Assembly as the Liberal and Country Party member for Hawthorn. He resigned from the party in 1963 and was defeated as an independent on 26 June 1964. He was subsequently a property developer and real estate agent. Garrisson died in Melbourne on 20 April 2013.

Victorian Legislative Assembly
Preceded by Jim Manson	Member for Hawthorn; 1958–1964	Succeeded by Walter Jona
