= John Kennedy (Australian politician) =

Australian politician (born 1947)

Member of the Victorian Legislative Assembly for Hawthorn
- In office 24 November 2018 – 30 November 2022
- Preceded by: John Pesutto
- Succeeded by: John Pesutto

Personal details
- Born: John Ormond Kennedy; 16 November 1947 (age 78) Sydney
- Party: Labor
- Education: University of Sydney; University of Melbourne
- Occupation: Teacher, Principal

John Ormond Kennedy (born 16 November 1947) is an Australian politician and member of the Labor Party. He was elected as member of the Victorian Legislative Assembly in November 2018, representing the seat of Hawthorn until 2022.

Kennedy succeeded incumbent Liberal MP John Pesutto in November 2018. He is only the second Labor member ever to win this traditional blue-ribbon Liberal seat, and the first in 63 years.

Before entering politics Kennedy worked as a teacher and one of his students was Tony Abbott who would later go on to become Prime Minister of Australia. Kennedy served as the Founding Principal of Loyola College for nearly thirty years (1979–2008). He stood in the 2013 federal election for the blue-ribbon Liberal seat of Kooyong, losing to Liberal incumbent Josh Frydenberg.

Kennedy is a member of ABC Friends (previously Friends of the ABC), the Graduate Union of The University of Melbourne Inc, Labor for Refugees, and Labor for a Republic and a monthly contributor to Jesuit Social Services, Médecins Sans Frontières and the United Nations High Commissioner for Refugees (UNHCR). He is not a member of any Labor faction.

Kennedy has stated that his top policy priorities are education and public transport.

== Personal life ==
At the time of his 2018 election victory, Kennedy resided in a retirement village and did not have a smartphone. Kennedy commutes on public transport, as he has never obtained his drivers’ licence.

In December 2021, Kennedy suffered a heart attack while walking with his wife on a Sydney holiday. After being assisted by a doctor and off-duty police officer who happened to be walking past at the time, Kennedy spent six days in hospital but returned to work on 24 January.

At the 2022 Victorian state election, Kennedy recontested Hawthorn but eventually lost to predecessor John Pesutto who faced a strong challenge and received just 21.6 per cent of the primary vote.

Parliament of Victoria
Preceded by John Pesutto	Member for Hawthorn; 2018–2022	Succeeded by John Pesutto
