= Paradise, Tyne and Wear =

Coordinates: 54.967°N 1.636°W

Paradise
- Location within Tyne and Wear
- OS grid reference: NZ234636
  - London: 242 miles (389 km)
- Metropolitan borough: Newcastle upon Tyne
- Metropolitan county: Tyne and Wear
- Region: North East
- Country: England
- Sovereign state: United Kingdom
- Post town: NEWCASTLE UPON TYNE
- Postcode district: NE2
- Dialling code: 0191
- Police: Northumbria
- Fire: Tyne and Wear
- Ambulance: North East
- UK Parliament: Newcastle upon Tyne Central

Paradise is an area of Newcastle upon Tyne, Tyne and Wear, England. It is centred on the area at the bottom of Atkinson Road, where it used to meet Scotswood Road.

In the Old Ordnance Survey map of Elswick for 1913 Paradise is just a small part of South Benwell, comprising the north shore of the River Tyne just west of the Armstrong Elswick Works, running up to Paradise Street and Evelyn Gardens, and the bottom half of Atkinson Road.

It was also the location of the Paradise Pit also known as West Benwell Coillery, which opened in 1819. Although the mine closed in 1848, it was responsible for the deaths of 38 men on 30 March 1925, when a flooded working was broken into from the Montagu Pit in nearby Scotswood.

Paradise is mentioned in the 1862 North East folk song "Blaydon Races" by George Ridley.
