= Robert Barbour (Victorian politician) =

Australian politician (1845–1914)

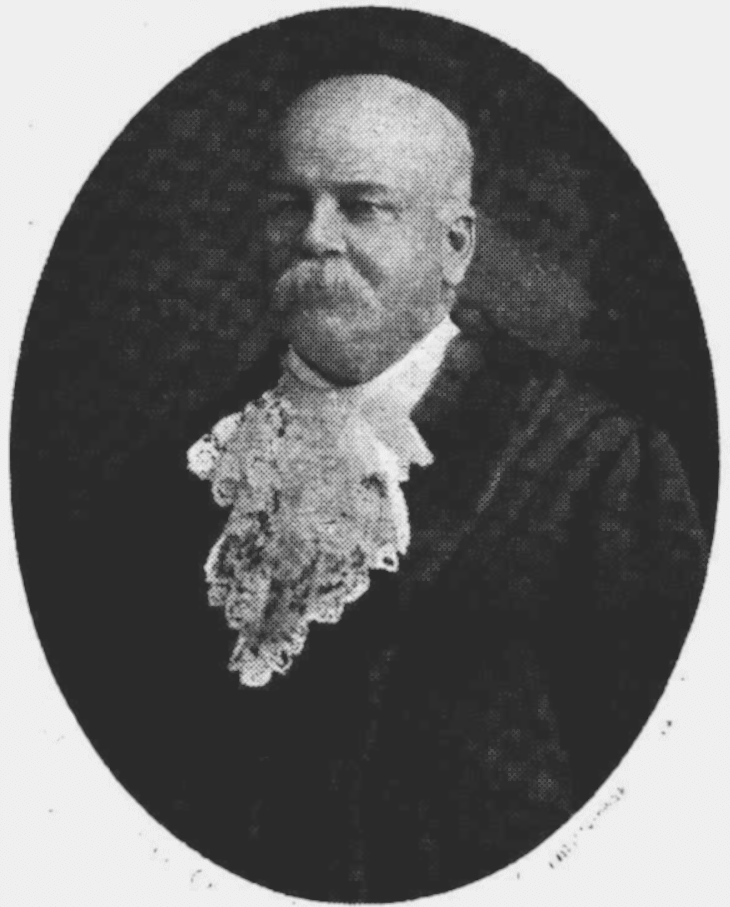

30th & 49th Mayor of Hawthorn
- In office 1894–1895
- Preceded by: Percy Joseph Russell
- Succeeded by: James Riddell
- In office 1913–1914
- Preceded by: John V. M. Wood
- Succeeded by: Edward Rigby

Member of the Victorian Legislative Assembly for Hawthorn
- In office 1 November 1900 – 1 September 1902
- Preceded by: Robert Murray Smith
- Succeeded by: George Swinburne

Personal details
- Born: 4 March 1845 Glasgow, Scotland
- Died: 14 November 1914 (aged 69) Hawthorn, Victoria, Australia

Robert Thomson Barbour (4 March 1845 – 29 November 1914) was an Australian politician.

Born in Glasgow to stonemason John Humphrey Barbour and Sarah Thomson, he arrived in Victoria in 1856 and became a clerk with the Public Works Department. He eventually became a quantity surveyor and a member of the Melbourne Tramways Trust, as well as a Hawthorn City Councillor (1891–1914, mayor 1894–95, 1913–14). On 4 March 1872, he married Agnes Crocket, with whom he had six children. In 1900 he was elected to the Victorian Legislative Assembly as the member for Hawthorn, serving until his defeat in 1902. Barbour died at Hawthorn in 1914.
