= Fred Edmunds =

Australian politician (1901–1985)

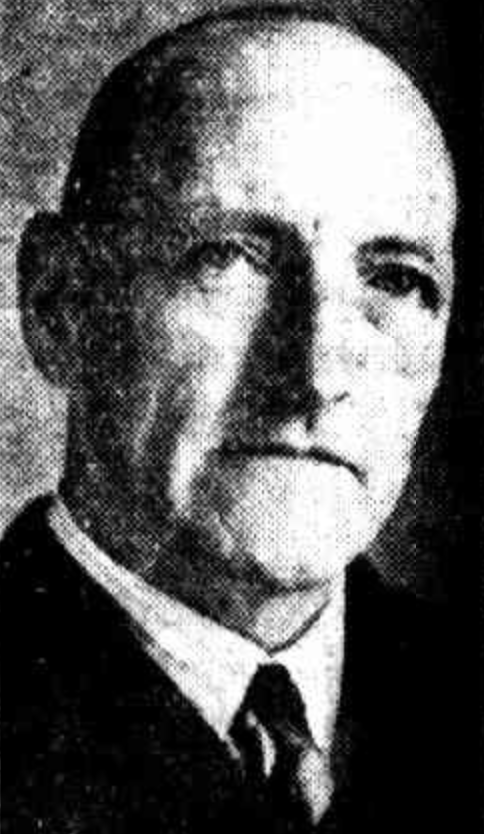
Fred Edmunds

Frederick Lewis Edmunds (12 April 1901 – 23 June 1985) was an Australian politician.

Born in Launceston, Tasmania, to schoolteacher Walter George Edmunds and Frances Jane Fysh (the niece of Sir Philip Fysh, a former member of the House of Representatives), he was educated at West Hawthorn State School, Scotch College and Melbourne University. On 22 October 1922 he married Lillian Florence Hore, with whom he had two daughters. He became an orchardist at Ringwood in 1924 and also taught at Fiji Methodist High School (1924–26), Ballarat College (1927–32) and Scotch College (1937–45). During World War II he served as a major in the Southern Command (1940–43).

Elected to the Victorian Legislative Assembly as the Liberal member for Hawthorn in 1945, he and fellow MP John Lechte were expelled from the party in February 1950 after criticising the Hollway Government. Edmunds was defeated at the election later that year. From 1950 to 1952 he was field secretary of the Queensland Temperance League, moving to the New South Wales Temperance Alliance in 1952 and becoming general secretary in 1954. Edmunds later retired to Melbourne and died in 1985.
