= Leslie Hollins =

Australian politician

Leslie Henry Hollins (12 September 1897 – 4 September 1984) was an Australian politician.

Born at Wonthaggi to farmer Henry Hollins and Lilian Mary Theresa Gardner, he attended local state schools before becoming an automotive engineer. He worked with the Melbourne General Omnibus Company in 1915 before serving in the Australian Imperial Force from 1916 to 1919. After the war he worked in England for a motor engineering firm before returning to Melbourne, establishing his own business, Hollins Motors, in 1921. On 26 December 1922 he married Rita Annie Payne, daughter of Senator Herbert Payne, with whom he had three children.

A social credit campaigner, he was elected to the Victorian Legislative Assembly in 1940 as the Independent member for Hawthorn. He was appointed Minister of Public Instruction and Labour in October 1945, but he was defeated at the election in November of that year. Hollins died in 1984 at Croydon.
