= Charles Murphy (Australian politician) =

Australian politician

Charles James Murphy (c.1909 – 6 January 1997) was an Australian politician who served as member for Hawthorn in the Victorian Legislative Assembly, representing the Labor Party from 1952–1955 and the Australian Labor Party (Anti-Communist) (Democratic Labor Party) from March–April 1955.
