= Electoral results for the district of Morwell =

Victoria, Australia, district election results

This is a list of electoral results for the Electoral district of Morwell in Victorian state elections.

== Members for Morwell ==
Member	Party	Term
Jim Balfour	Liberal	1955–1967
Archie Tanner	Liberal	1967–1970
Derek Amos	Labor	1970–1981
Valerie Callister	Labor	1981–1988
Keith Hamilton	Labor	1988–2002
Brendan Jenkins	Labor	2002–2006
Russell Northe	National	2006–2017
Russell Northe	Independent	2017–2022
Martin Cameron	National	2022–present

== Election results ==
=== Elections in the 2020s ===
2022 Victorian state election: Morwell
Party	Candidate	Votes	%	±%
Labor	Kate Maxfield	13,601	31.44	−6.76
National	Martin Cameron	9,902	22.89	+14.09
Liberal	Dale Harriman	6,710	15.51	+0.31
One Nation	Allan Hicken	2,648	6.12	+6.12
Independent	Sharon Gibson	2,515	5.81	+5.81
Shooters, Fishers, Farmers	David Snelling	2044	4.72	−1.08
Greens	Rochelle Hine	1,830	4.23	+0.43
Independent	Tracie Lund	1,206	2.79	+1.00
Freedom	Alex Maidana	900	2.08	+2.08
Family First	Brendan Clarke	749	1.73	+1.73
Animal Justice	Jessica McAuliffe	687	1.59	+1.59
Independent	Lisa Proctor	469	1.08	+1.08
Total formal votes		43,261	92.46	+0.34
Informal votes		3,526	7.54	−0.34
Turnout		46,787	86.99	−3.04
Two-party-preferred result
National	Martin Cameron	23,541	54.42	+8.42
Labor	Kate Maxfield	19,720	45.58	−8.42
National notional gain from Labor		Swing	+8.42	

=== Elections in the 2010s ===
2018 Victorian state election: Morwell
Party	Candidate	Votes	%	±%
Labor	Mark Richards	13,725	34.19	−1.40
Independent	Russell Northe	7,851	19.56	+19.56
Liberal	Dale Harriman	4,955	12.34	+12.34
National	Sheridan Bond	4,283	10.67	−33.75
Shooters, Fishers, Farmers	Ricky Muir	2,856	7.11	+7.11
Independent	Ray Burgess	2,388	5.95	+5.95
Greens	Daniel Caffrey	1,460	3.64	−1.08
Aussie Battler	Reece Diggins	892	2.22	+2.22
Independent	Tracie Lund	841	2.10	−8.81
Democratic Labour	Nathan Keen	654	1.63	+1.63
Independent	Christine Sindt	237	0.59	+0.59
Total formal votes		40,142	92.12	−2.50
Informal votes		3,436	7.88	+2.50
Turnout		43,578	90.03	−3.38
Two-party-preferred result
Labor	Mark Richards	21,037	52.41	+4.21
National	Sheridan Bond	19,105	47.59	−4.21
Two-candidate-preferred result
Independent	Russell Northe	20,808	51.84	+51.84
Labor	Mark Richards	19,334	48.16	−0.16
Independent gain from National		Swing	N/A	

2014 Victorian state election: Morwell
Party	Candidate	Votes	%	±%
National	Russell Northe	17,824	44.4	−4.9
Labor	Jadon Mintern	14,282	35.6	+4.3
Independent	Tracie Lund	4,377	10.9	+10.9
Greens	Dan Caffrey	1,894	4.7	−0.3
Country Alliance	Stewart Birkett	950	2.4	−1.3
Rise Up Australia	Peter Dorian	423	1.1	+1.1
Independent	Jacqueline Rose	380	0.9	+0.9
Total formal votes		40,130	94.6	−0.4
Informal votes		2,283	5.4	+0.4
Turnout		42,413	93.4	+1.4
Two-party-preferred result
National	Russell Northe	20,787	51.8	−11.5
Labor	Jadon Mintern	19,343	48.2	+11.5
National hold		Swing	−11.5	

2010 Victorian state election: Morwell
Party	Candidate	Votes	%	±%
National	Russell Northe	19,200	56.11	+28.52
Labor	Graeme Middlemiss	9,752	28.50	−12.07
Greens	Dan Jordan	1,645	4.81	−0.26
Country Alliance	Peter Kelly	1,226	3.58	+3.58
Independent	Lou Sigmund	968	2.83	+2.83
Independent	Glyn Baker	851	2.49	+2.49
Independent	Peter Gardner	574	1.68	+1.68
Total formal votes		34,216	94.90	−0.87
Informal votes		1,838	5.10	+0.87
Turnout		36,054	93.29	−0.41
Two-party-preferred result
National	Russell Northe	22,726	66.26	+14.14
Labor	Graeme Middlemiss	11,572	33.74	−14.14
National hold		Swing	+14.14	

=== Elections in the 2000s ===
2006 Victorian state election: Morwell
Party	Candidate	Votes	%	±%
Labor	Brendan Jenkins	13,347	40.6	−2.6
National	Russell Northe	9,077	27.6	+15.3
Liberal	Stephen Parker	4,608	14.0	−5.3
Independent	Lisa Proctor	2,938	8.9	+8.9
Greens	Jeffrey Wrathall	1,668	5.1	−0.8
Family First	Katy Koo	1,264	3.8	+3.8
Total formal votes		32,902	95.8	−0.5
Informal votes		1,455	4.2	+0.5
Turnout		34,357	93.7	
Two-party-preferred result
National	Russell Northe	17,173	52.2	+52.2
Labor	Brendan Jenkins	15,729	47.8	−7.1
National gain from Labor		Swing	N/A	

2002 Victorian state election: Morwell
Party	Candidate	Votes	%	±%
Labor	Brendan Jenkins	14,073	43.2	−12.4
Liberal	Diane Blackwood	6,289	19.3	−15.5
Independent	Brad Platschinda	4,733	14.5	+14.5
National	Jenny Hammett	4,014	12.3	+12.3
Greens	Catheryn Thompson	1,917	5.9	+5.9
Independent	Harry Alexander	1,521	4.7	+4.7
Total formal votes		32,547	96.3	−1.5
Informal votes		1,257	3.7	+1.5
Turnout		33,804	93.8	
Two-party-preferred result
Labor	Brendan Jenkins	17,855	54.9	−4.4
Liberal	Diane Blackwood	14,692	45.1	+4.4
Labor hold		Swing	−4.4	

=== Elections in the 1990s ===
1999 Victorian state election: Morwell
Party	Candidate	Votes	%	±%
Labor	Keith Hamilton	17,366	55.5	+4.0
Liberal	Peter Tyler	11,040	35.3	+35.3
Independent	Helen Hoppner	2,912	9.3	+9.3
Total formal votes		31,318	97.8	−0.1
Informal votes		700	2.2	+0.1
Turnout		32,018	94.9	
Two-party-preferred result
Labor	Keith Hamilton	18,457	58.9	+6.2
Liberal	Peter Tyler	12,856	41.1	+41.1
Labor hold		Swing	+6.2	

1996 Victorian state election: Morwell
Party	Candidate	Votes	%	±%
Labor	Keith Hamilton	16,080	51.5	+8.4
National	Helen Hoppner	14,094	45.1	+28.7
Natural Law	Michael Pollock	1,053	3.4	+2.8
Total formal votes		31,227	97.9	+0.6
Informal votes		673	2.1	−0.6
Turnout		31,900	95.1	
Two-party-preferred result
Labor	Keith Hamilton	16,452	52.7	−1.3
National	Helen Hoppner	14,746	47.3	+1.3
Labor hold		Swing	−1.3	

1992 Victorian state election: Morwell
Party	Candidate	Votes	%	±%
Labor	Keith Hamilton	13,524	43.1	+1.3
Liberal	Martin Hill	8,177	26.0	+5.9
National	Tom Wallace	5,169	16.5	+2.4
Independent	Barry Murphy	3,694	11.8	−0.7
Independent	Bill Mele	642	2.0	+2.0
Natural Law	Martin Kirsch	195	0.6	+0.6
Total formal votes		31,401	97.2	+0.6
Informal votes		889	2.8	−0.6
Turnout		32,290	96.4	
Two-party-preferred result
Labor	Keith Hamilton	16,906	54.0	+1.8
Liberal	Martin Hill	14,428	46.0	−1.8
Labor hold		Swing	+1.8	

=== Elections in the 1980s ===
1988 Victorian state election: Morwell
Party	Candidate	Votes	%	±%
Labor	Keith Hamilton	11,675	42.03	−10.68
Liberal	Norman Olsen	5,577	20.08	−5.53
Independent	Barry Murphy	3,687	13.27	+13.27
National	Alan Witchell	3,507	12.63	+4.23
Independent	Geoffrey Francis	2,597	9.35	+9.35
Democrats	James Richards	733	2.64	+2.64
Total formal votes		27,776	96.61	−1.20
Informal votes		975	3.39	+1.20
Turnout		28,751	94.28	+0.65
Two-party-preferred result
Labor	Keith Hamilton	14,654	52.79	−6.08
Liberal	Norman Olsen	13,105	47.21	+6.08
Labor hold		Swing	−6.08	

1985 Victorian state election: Morwell
Party	Candidate	Votes	%	±%
Labor	Valerie Callister	14,472	52.7	−7.9
Liberal	Graeme Bond	6,976	25.4	+1.3
Independent	Geoffrey Francis	3,701	13.5	+13.5
National	Terie Porter	2,305	8.4	−0.5
Total formal votes		27,454	97.8	
Informal votes		616	2.2	
Turnout		28,070	93.6	
Two-party-preferred result
Labor	Valerie Callister	15,759	57.4	−7.4
Liberal	Graeme Bond	11,695	42.6	+7.4
Labor hold		Swing	−7.4	

1982 Victorian state election: Morwell
Party	Candidate	Votes	%	±%
Labor	Valerie Callister	16,045	60.6	−0.2
Liberal	David Little	6,382	24.1	−1.3
National	Gordon Robertson	2,347	8.9	+1.5
Democrats	Ross Ollquist	1,713	6.5	+1.5
Total formal votes		26,487	97.8	+0.6
Informal votes		592	2.2	−0.6
Turnout		27,079	94.5	+0.3
Two-party-preferred result
Labor	Valerie Callister	17,265	65.2	−1.4
Liberal	David Little	9,222	34.8	+1.4
Labor hold		Swing	−1.4	

1981 Morwell state by-election
Party	Candidate	Votes	%	±%
Labor	Valerie Callister	14,383	61.7	+0.9
Liberal	Ian Lockwood	5,681	24.4	−1.0
Democrats	Ross Ollquist	2,178	9.4	+4.4
Democratic Labor	Gerard Madden	1,056	4.5	+4.5
Total formal votes		23,298	98.3	+1.1
Informal votes		408	1.7	−1.1
Turnout		23,706	85.0	−9.2
Two-party-preferred result
Labor	Valerie Callister		66.9	+0.3
Liberal	Ian Lockwood		33.1	−0.3
Labor hold		Swing	+0.3	

=== Elections in the 1970s ===
1979 Victorian state election: Morwell
Party	Candidate	Votes	%	±%
Labor	Derek Amos	14,946	60.8	−1.4
Liberal	Ian Lockwood	6,239	25.4	+2.1
National	Gary Black	1,808	7.3	+7.3
Democrats	Ross Ollquist	1,230	5.0	+5.0
Independent	Robert McCracken	372	1.5	+1.5
Total formal votes		24,595	97.2	−1.1
Informal votes		713	2.8	+1.1
Turnout		25,308	94.2	+0.4
Two-party-preferred result
Labor	Derek Amos	16,384	66.6	+3.0
Liberal	Ian Lockwood	8,211	33.4	−3.0
Labor hold		Swing	+3.0	

1976 Victorian state election: Morwell
Party	Candidate	Votes	%	±%
Labor	Derek Amos	14,832	62.2	+3.7
Liberal	Frank Hall	5,551	23.3	−1.6
National	James Davis	2,444	10.3	+0.6
Democratic Labor	John Mann	1,022	4.3	−2.6
Total formal votes		23,849	98.3	
Informal votes		409	1.7	
Turnout		24,258	93.8	
Two-party-preferred result
Labor	Derek Amos	15,178	63.6	+2.7
Liberal	Frank Hall	8,671	36.4	−2.7
Labor hold		Swing	+2.7	

1973 Victorian state election: Morwell
Party	Candidate	Votes	%	±%
Labor	Derek Amos	13,611	56.0	+7.0
Liberal	Desmond Bennett	5,988	24.6	−2.4
Country	John Vinall	3,073	12.6	−0.2
Democratic Labor	Leslie Hilton	1,636	6.7	−4.5
Total formal votes		24,308	97.8	+0.3
Informal votes		534	2.2	−0.3
Turnout		24,842	95.0	−0.1
Two-party-preferred result
Labor	Derek Amos	14,163	58.3	+0.4
Liberal	Desmond Bennett	10,145	41.7	−0.4
Labor hold		Swing	+0.4	

1970 Victorian state election: Morwell
Party	Candidate	Votes	%	±%
Labor	Derek Amos	10,923	49.0	+7.2
Liberal	Archie Tanner	6,012	27.0	+6.2
Country	James Wyeth	2,854	12.8	−11.3
Democratic Labor	Thomas Lawless	2,505	11.2	−2.1
Total formal votes		22,294	97.5	+0.2
Informal votes		578	2.5	−0.2
Turnout		22,872	95.1	−0.5
Two-party-preferred result
Labor	Derek Amos	12,915	57.9	+9.2
Liberal	Archie Tanner	9,379	42.1	−9.2
Labor gain from Liberal		Swing	+9.2	

=== Elections in the 1960s ===
1967 Victorian state election: Morwell
Party	Candidate	Votes	%	±%
Labor	Colin Pratt	8,804	41.8	+14.6
Country	John Vinall	5,070	24.1	−9.7
Liberal	Archie Tanner	4,373	20.8	−4.4
Democratic Labor	Thomas Lawless	2,808	13.3	−0.6
Total formal votes		21,055	97.3	
Informal votes		575	2.7	
Turnout		21,630	95.6	
Two-party-preferred result
Liberal	Archie Tanner	10,793	51.3	−13.5
Labor	Colin Pratt	10,262	48.7	+13.5
Liberal hold		Swing	−13.5	

1964 Victorian state election: Morwell
Party	Candidate	Votes	%	±%
Labor	George Wragg	9,826	42.3	−1.2
Liberal and Country	Jim Balfour	8,722	37.6	+5.8
Democratic Labor	Bernard Shaw	2,844	12.2	−0.7
Country	Ian Gibson	1,826	7.9	−4.0
Total formal votes		23,218	98.1	+0.4
Informal votes		444	1.9	−0.4
Turnout		23,662	95.8	+0.7
Two-party-preferred result
Liberal and Country	Jim Balfour	12,915	55.6	+4.0
Labor	George Wragg	10,303	44.4	−4.0
Liberal and Country hold		Swing	+4.0	

1961 Victorian state election: Morwell
Party	Candidate	Votes	%	±%
Labor	George Brown	9,267	43.5	−1.7
Liberal and Country	Jim Balfour	6,767	31.8	−9.9
Democratic Labor	Leslie Hilton	2,747	12.9	−0.2
Country	John Vinall	2,526	11.9	+11.9
Total formal votes		21,307	97.7	−0.8
Informal votes		509	2.3	+0.8
Turnout		21,816	95.1	+0.4
Two-party-preferred result
Liberal and Country	Jim Balfour	10,995	51.6	−1.1
Labor	George Brown	10,312	48.4	+1.1
Liberal and Country hold		Swing	−1.1	

=== Elections in the 1950s ===
1958 Victorian state election: Morwell
Party	Candidate	Votes	%	±%
Labor	Hector Stoddart	8,898	45.2	
Liberal and Country	Jim Balfour	8,223	41.7	
Democratic Labor	Alfred Gerrard	2,587	13.1	
Total formal votes		19,708	98.5	
Informal votes		300	1.5	
Turnout		20,008	94.7	
Two-party-preferred result
Liberal and Country	Jim Balfour	10,379	52.7	
Labor	Hector Stoddart	9,329	47.3	
Liberal and Country hold		Swing		

1955 Victorian state election: Morwell
Party	Candidate	Votes	%	±%
Labor	Hector Stoddart	7,933	41.3	
Liberal and Country	Jim Balfour	4,993	26.0	
Country	George Purvis	4,287	22.3	
Labor (A-C)	Gordon Green	1,979	10.3	
Total formal votes		19,192	98.4	
Informal votes		303	1.6	
Turnout		19,495	92.9	
Two-party-preferred result
Liberal and Country	Jim Balfour	10,198	53.1	
Labor	Hector Stoddart	8,994	46.9	
Liberal and Country gain from Labor		Swing		
