= Candidates of the 1967 Victorian state election =

The 1967 Victorian state election was held on 29 April 1967.

== Seat changes ==
- Burwood Liberal MLA Jim MacDonald contested Glen Iris.
- Caulfield Liberal MLA Ian McLaren contested Bennettswood.
- Fitzroy Labor MLA Denis Lovegrove contested Sunshine.
- Geelong West Labor MLA Neil Trezise contested Geelong North.
- Grant Labor MLA Jack Ginifer contested Deer Park.
- Mentone Liberal MLA Edward Meagher contested Frankston.
- Moorabbin Liberal MLA Bob Suggett contested Bentleigh.
- Mornington Liberal MLA Roberts Dunstan contested Dromana.
- Morwell Liberal MLA Jim Balfour contested Narracan.
- Mulgrave Liberal MLA Ray Wiltshire contested Syndal.
- Ormond Liberal MLA Joe Rafferty contested Glenhuntly.
- Ripponlea Liberal MLA Edgar Tanner contested Caulfield.
- Scoresby Liberal MLA Bill Borthwick contested Monbulk.
- Higinbotham Liberal MLC Lindsay Thompson contested Monash Province.
- Southern Liberal MLC Gilbert Chandler contested Boronia Province.

== Retiring Members ==
=== Labor ===
- Kevin Holland MLA (Flemington)
- Charlie Mutton MLA (Coburg)
- Roy Schintler MLA (Yarraville)

=== Liberal ===
- Richard Gainey MLA (Elsternwick)
- Philip Hudson MLA (Toorak)
- Charles Gawith MLC (Monash)
- Thomas Grigg MLC (Bendigo)

== Legislative Assembly ==
Sitting members are shown in bold text. Successful candidates are highlighted in the relevant colour. Where there is possible confusion, an asterisk (*) is also used.

Electorate	Held by	Labor candidates	Liberal candidates	Country candidates	DLP candidates	Other candidates
Albert Park	Labor	**Keith Sutton**	Constantine Kondos		Victor Coppens	
Ballarat North	Liberal	Kevin Flynn	**Tom Evans**		Walter Brown	
Ballarat South	Liberal	Philip Gray	**Bill Stephen**		Francis Brown	
Balwyn	Liberal	Richard Dunstan	**Alex Taylor**		Andrew Gyles	
Bellarine	Liberal	Francis Brady	Aurel Smith		James Crockett	
Benalla	Country	Nathaniel Robertson	Ian Bayles	**Tom Trewin**	Christopher Cody	
Benambra	Country	Tony Lamb	Henry Petty	**Tom Mitchell**	Francis Keenan	
Bendigo	Liberal	Donald McIntyre	**Robert Trethewey**	Allan Miles	Paul Brennan	
Bennettswood	Liberal	Cyril Kennedy	**Ian McLaren**		James Tighe	
Bentleigh	Liberal	Alexander McDonald	**Bob Suggett**		Robert Semmel	Harold Stevens (Ind)
Box Hill	Liberal	Frank Walsh	**George Reid**		Edmund Burgi	Rodney Northover (Ind)
Brighton	Liberal	Bill Walsh	**John Rossiter**		John Wagstaff	
Broadmeadows	Labor	**John Wilton**	John Blaze		Francis Dowling	
Brunswick East	Labor	**Leo Fennessy**	Anthony Wreford		Peter McCabe	John Daley (Ind)
Brunswick West	Labor	**Campbell Turnbull**	Victor French		John Flint	
Camberwell	Liberal	Adrianus Knulst	**Vernon Wilcox**		Joseph Stanley	
Caulfield	Liberal	Bob Hogg	**Edgar Tanner**		Peter Grant	
Coburg	Labor	Bill Brown	Charles Symons		John Hardy	Jack Mutton (Ind)
Dandenong	Liberal	Alan Lind	**Len Reid**		Kevin Leydon	
Deer Park	Labor	**Jack Ginifer**	Wallace More		James Marmion	Mervyn Kelly (Ind)
Dromana	Liberal	Barrie Rimmer	**Roberts Dunstan**	William Weston	Michael Kearney	
Dundas	Liberal	Jack Jones	**Sir William McDonald**	Reginald Fogarty	James Eveston	
Essendon	Liberal	Arthur Sanger	**Kenneth Wheeler**		Kevin Digby	Francis Zając (Ind)
Evelyn	Liberal	Arnold Hubbard	**Russell Stokes**	William Nankervis	Audrey Walsh	Henry Folan (Ind)
Footscray	Labor	**Bill Divers**	Graham Bungate		Robin Thomas	
Frankston	Liberal	Bruce Aitken	**Edward Meagher**		John Cass	
Geelong	Liberal	Ronald McKenzie	**Hayden Birrell**		John Timberlake	
Geelong North	Labor	**Neil Trezise**	Peter Lowe		William Bond	
Gippsland East	Country	Thomas Powell	Ronald Palmer	**Bruce Evans**	Frank Burns	
Gippsland South	Country	Derek Amos	Harold Suter	**Sir Herbert Hyland**	Geoffrey Farrell	John Mansfield (Ind); John Routledge (Ind)
Gippsland West	Country	Alastair MacKillop	Harry Marson	**Leslie Cochrane**	Michael Houlihan	Peter Milner (Ind)
Gisborne	Liberal	Michael Nolan	Julian Doyle	George Duncan	John McMahon	Peter Hatherley (Ind); Jeffrey Hatswell (Ind); Derek Hobler (Ind); Peter Kensett (Ind); Warren Nicol (Ind)
Glen Iris	Liberal	Allan McDonald	**Jim MacDonald**		Kenneth Abbott	
Glenhuntly	Liberal	Anthony Miller	**Joe Rafferty**		Raymond Studham	
Greensborough	Liberal	Bob Fell	Monte Vale		Bill Barry	
Hampden	Liberal	Fred Rowe	**Sir Henry Bolte**	Gilbert Anderson	Francis O'Brien	Ian McQuie (LRG); Glynne Wheler (Ind)
Hawthorn	Liberal	Dolph Eddy	**Walter Jona**		Daniel Condon	
Heatherton	Liberal	Keith Ewert	Norman Billing		Joseph O'Neill	
Ivanhoe	Liberal	Thomas Rich	**Vernon Christie**		Cyril Cummins	Bruce Graham (Ind)
Kara Kara	Country	George Jeffs	Alexander Lee	**Bill Phelan**	Bruno D'Elia	
Kew	Liberal	Eric Sibly	**Arthur Rylah**		Francis Duffy	
Lowan	Country	Roslyn Snow	**Jim McCabe**	Ray Buckley	Michael Grimes	
Malvern	Liberal	Thomas Evans	**Sir John Bloomfield**		John Olle	
Melbourne	Labor	**Arthur Clarey**	Anthony Gilligan		James Whitehead	
Mentone	Liberal	Nola Barber	Bill Templeton		George White	Clifford Baragwanath (Ind)
Midlands	Labor	**Clive Stoneham**	Douglas Johanson	Graham Brownbill	James Bourke	Arthur Bailey (Ind)
Mildura	Country	Lance Fraser	Bruce Wright	**Milton Whiting**	John Conroy	
Mitcham	Liberal	Graham Walsh	Dorothy Goble		Gerald Shinnick	
Monbulk	Liberal	Margaret Howells	**Bill Borthwick**		Noel Clarke	Ronald Pike (Ind)
Moonee Ponds	Liberal	Tom Edmunds	**Jack Holden**		Barry O'Brien	Lancelot Hutchinson (Ind)
Moorabbin	Liberal	Harry Rourke	Llew Reese		Richard Neilson	
Morwell	Liberal	Colin Pratt	Archie Tanner	John Vinall	Thomas Lawless	
Murray Valley	Country	Robert Cross	Albert Baker	**George Moss**	John Patterson	
Narracan	Liberal	George Wragg	**Jim Balfour**	Daniel Vaughan	Peter Saunders	
Northcote	Labor	**Frank Wilkes**	Peter Falconer		Jack Little	
Oakleigh	Liberal	Glenn Dudley	**Alan Scanlan**		Bernard Slattery	
Polwarth	Liberal	Alfred Cartwright	**Tom Darcy**	John McCue	Leonard Eyre	
Portland	Liberal	Bob McClure	Don McKellar	Clive Mitchell	Frederick Baulch	
Prahran	Liberal	John Dyer	**Sam Loxton**		Gavan Grimes	George Gahan (Ind); John Ketelhorn (Ind)
Preston	Labor	**Charlie Ring**	James Spicer		Maurice Horwood	
Reservoir	Labor	**Harry Jenkins**	Peter Allaway		Frederick Whitling	William Barnes (CPA); James Christie (Ind)
Richmond	Labor	**Clyde Holding**	Graham Jackson		James Abikhair	
Ringwood	Liberal	Norma Sweetman	**Jim Manson**		Graeme Madigan	
Rodney	Country	David Bornstein	Peter Gibson	**Russell McDonald**	Augustine McCormack	
St Kilda	Liberal	Brian Zouch	**Brian Dixon**		John Hughes	
Sandringham	Liberal	Kevin Vaughan	**Murray Porter**		William Leech	
Scoresby	Liberal	Caroline Wilder	Geoff Hayes		Barry Brindle	
Shepparton	Country	Neil Frankland	Thomas Gribben	Peter Ross-Edwards	Bruce Morison	Bill Hunter (Ind)
Sunshine	Labor	**Denis Lovegrove**	Peter Ross		Robert Charles	Roy Hartley (Ind)
Swan Hill	Country	Robert Dorning	Bernard Treseder	**Harold Stirling**	John Carty	
Syndal	Liberal	Robert Fordham	**Ray Wiltshire**		John Rose	
Warrnambool	Liberal	Vincent Ayres	Ian Smith	Cyril Boyle	Patrick Bourke	**George Gibbs** (Ind)
Williamstown	Labor	**Larry Floyd**	Robert Lawson		John Bacon	Ian Daykin (CPA)

== Legislative Council ==
Sitting members are shown in bold text. Successful candidates are highlighted in the relevant colour. Where there is possible confusion, an asterisk (*) is also used.

Province	Held by	Labor candidates	Liberal candidates	Country candidates	DLP candidates	Other candidates
Ballarat	Liberal	Kevin Healy	**Pat Dickie**	Robert Cooper	James Burns	
Bendigo	Liberal	Kevin Curran	Fred Grimwade	Kenneth McLennan	William Drechsler	
Boronia	Liberal	William French	**Gilbert Chandler**		Frederick Rosenbrock	
Doutta Galla	Labor	**John Tripovich**	Gabrielle Adams		Alfred Gerrard	
East Yarra	Liberal	James Lawson	**Bill Campbell**		John Rogers	
Gippsland	Country	Ivan Maddern	John Sullivan	**Bob May**	John Hansen	
Higinbotham	Liberal	Anthony Scarcella	William Fry		Ian Radnell	
Melbourne	Labor	**Doug Elliot**	Norman Long		Gordon Haberman	Frederick Levin (Ind)
Melbourne North	Labor	**John Galbally**	Walter Dale		Joseph O'Leary	
Melbourne West	Labor	**Alexander Knight**	Joseph Kadane		Kenneth Berrie	
Monash	Liberal	Graham Lacey	**Lindsay Thompson**		William Hoyne	
Northern	Country		Laurence Troy	Stuart McDonald	Peter Lawrence	**Percy Feltham** (Ind)
North Eastern	Country		George Ikinger	**Keith Bradbury**	William Findlay	
North Western	Country	Bruce Phayer	Walter Scown	**Arthur Mansell**	Daniel Cooper	
South Eastern	Liberal	Sydney Pargeter	**Alan Hunt**		William Scantlebury	
South Western	Liberal	John Woolfe	**Stan Gleeson**	Christian Edwards	Gerald Gleeson	
Templestowe	Liberal	Ian Stewart	Vasey Houghton		Leo Morison	
Western	Liberal	Edward Lewis	**Ronald Mack**	Linden Cameron	Alan Beattie	
