= Results of the 1967 Victorian state election (Legislative Assembly) =

Australian state election results

Victorian state election, 29 April 1967 Legislative Assembly << 1964–1970 >>
Enrolled voters	1,723,981				
Votes cast	1,625,239		Turnout	94.27	-0.13
Informal votes	51,384		Informal	3.16	+0.85
Summary of votes by party
Party	Primary votes	%	Swing	Seats	Change
Labor	596,520	37.90	+1.68	16	-2
Liberal	589,985	37.49	-2.14	44	+6
Democratic Labor	224,989	14.30	-0.68	0	±0
Country	136,126	8.65	-0.11	12	+2
Independent	24,792	1.58	+1.41	1	+1
Other	1,443	0.09	-0.16	0	±0
Total	1,573,855			73	
Two-party-preferred
Liberal	918,461	58.4	–0.6		
Labor	655,394	41.6	+0.6		

This is a list of electoral district results for the Victorian 1967 election.

== Results by electoral district ==
=== Albert Park ===
1967 Victorian state election: Albert Park
Party	Candidate	Votes	%	±%
Labor	Keith Sutton	12,662	59.9	−1.4
Liberal	Constantine Kondos	4,849	22.9	+1.0
Democratic Labor	Victor Coppens	3,631	17.2	−0.4
Total formal votes		21,142	95.3	
Informal votes		1,053	4.7	
Turnout		22,195	92.2	
Two-party-preferred result
Labor	Keith Sutton	13,206	62.5	−1.3
Liberal	Constantine Kondos	7,936	37.5	+1.3
Labor hold		Swing	−1.3	

=== Ballarat North ===
1967 Victorian state election: Ballarat North
Party	Candidate	Votes	%	±%
Liberal	Tom Evans	11,169	50.1	−0.5
Labor	Kevin Flynn	7,342	32.9	+1.2
Democratic Labor	Walter Brown	3,787	17.0	−0.7
Total formal votes		22,298	98.1	
Informal votes		431	1.9	
Turnout		22,729	96.7	
Two-party-preferred result
Liberal	Tom Evans	14,388	64.5	−1.1
Labor	Kevin Flynn	7,910	35.5	+1.1
Liberal hold		Swing	−1.1	

=== Ballarat South ===
1967 Victorian state election: Ballarat South
Party	Candidate	Votes	%	±%
Liberal	Bill Stephen	9,208	43.5	+1.3
Labor	Philip Gray	8,298	39.2	−0.9
Democratic Labor	Francis Brown	3,678	17.4	−0.3
Total formal votes		21,184	97.4	
Informal votes		576	2.6	
Turnout		21,760	95.7	
Two-party-preferred result
Liberal	Bill Stephen	11,818	55.6	−1.8
Labor	Philip Gray	9,366	44.4	+1.8
Liberal hold		Swing	+1.8	

=== Balwyn ===
1967 Victorian state election: Balwyn
Party	Candidate	Votes	%	±%
Liberal	Alex Taylor	14,004	58.0	−4.5
Labor	Richard Dunstan	7,248	30.0	+4.3
Democratic Labor	Andrew Gyles	2,910	12.0	+0.2
Total formal votes		24,162	98.0	
Informal votes		489	2.0	
Turnout		24,651	93.4	
Two-party-preferred result
Liberal	Alex Taylor	16,478	68.2	−4.4
Labor	Richard Dunstan	7,684	31.8	+4.4
Liberal hold		Swing	−4.4	

=== Bellarine ===
1967 Victorian state election: Bellarine
Party	Candidate	Votes	%	±%
Liberal	Aurel Smith	9,807	50.6	−6.0
Labor	Francis Brady	7,191	37.1	+4.8
Democratic Labor	James Crockett	2,392	12.3	+0.9
Total formal votes		19,390	97.9	
Informal votes		422	2.1	
Turnout		19,812	94.7	
Two-party-preferred result
Liberal	Aurel Smith	11,840	61.1	−5.0
Labor	Francis Brady	7,550	38.9	+5.0
Liberal hold		Swing	−5.0	

=== Benalla ===
1967 Victorian state election: Benalla
Party	Candidate	Votes	%	±%
Country	Tom Trewin	8,761	52.1	−8.0
Labor	Nathanial Robertson	3,179	18.9	+18.9
Liberal	Ian Bayles	2,898	17.2	−5.7
Democratic Labor	Christopher Cody	1,989	11.8	−5.2
Total formal votes		16,827	97.6	
Informal votes		412	2.4	
Turnout		17,239	96.1	
Two-party-preferred result
Country	Tom Trewin	13,059	77.6	+14.1
Labor	Nathanial Robertson	3,768	22.4	+22.4
Country hold		Swing	+14.1	

=== Benambra ===
1967 Victorian state election: Benambra
Party	Candidate	Votes	%	±%
Country	Tom Mitchell	9,440	54.7	+4.9
Labor	Tony Lamb	3,469	20.1	−2.1
Liberal	Henry Petty	2,177	12.6	−2.0
Democratic Labor	Francis Keenan	2,169	12.6	−0.8
Total formal votes		17,255	97.4	
Informal votes		467	2.6	
Turnout		17,722	95.4	
Two-party-preferred result
Country	Tom Mitchell	13,242	76.8	+1.6
Labor	Tony Lamb	4,013	23.2	−1.6
Country hold		Swing	+1.6	

=== Bendigo ===
1967 Victorian state election: Bendigo
Party	Candidate	Votes	%	±%
Labor	Donald McIntyre	8,598	40.3	−3.8
Liberal	Robert Trethewey	6,861	32.1	−6.2
Democratic Labor	Paul Brennan	3,151	14.7	−2.9
Country	Allan Miles	2,750	12.9	+12.9
Total formal votes		21,360	97.8	
Informal votes		482	2.2	
Turnout		21,842	95.8	
Two-party-preferred result
Liberal	Robert Trethewey	10,824	50.7	−1.1
Labor	Donald McIntyre	10,536	49.3	+1.1
Liberal hold		Swing	−1.1	

=== Bennettswood ===
1967 Victorian state election: Bennettswood
Party	Candidate	Votes	%	±%
Liberal	Ian McLaren	11,592	48.4	−0.1
Labor	Cyril Kennedy	9,300	38.9	+1.9
Democratic Labor	James Tighe	3,047	12.7	−1.8
Total formal votes		23,939	97.7	
Informal votes		550	2.3	
Turnout		24,489	95.1	
Two-party-preferred result
Liberal	Ian McLaren	14,378	60.1	−0.8
Labor	Cyril Kennedy	9,561	39.9	+0.8
Liberal hold		Swing	−0.8	

=== Bentleigh ===
1967 Victorian state election: Bentleigh
Party	Candidate	Votes	%	±%
Liberal	Bob Suggett	9,184	38.0	−11.0
Labor	Alexander McDonald	8,095	33.5	−3.9
Independent	Harold Stevens	4,305	17.8	+17.8
Democratic Labor	Robert Semmel	2,576	10.7	−2.9
Total formal votes		24,160	97.6	
Informal votes		584	2.4	
Turnout		24,744	94.9	
Two-party-preferred result
Liberal	Bob Suggett	15,018	62.2	+1.6
Labor	Alexander McDonald	9,142	37.8	−1.6
Liberal hold		Swing	+1.6	

=== Box Hill ===
1967 Victorian state election: Box Hill
Party	Candidate	Votes	%	±%
Liberal	George Reid	13,185	48.9	−3.8
Labor	Frank Walsh	8,714	32.3	+0.2
Democratic Labor	Edmund Burgi	4,205	15.6	+0.6
Independent	Rodney Northover	849	3.1	+3.1
Total formal votes		26,953	97.7	
Informal votes		641	2.3	
Turnout		27,594	94.6	
Two-party-preferred result
Liberal	George Reid	17,395	64.5	−1.2
Labor	Frank Walsh	9,558	35.5	+1.2
Liberal hold		Swing	−1.2	

=== Brighton ===
1967 Victorian state election: Brighton
Party	Candidate	Votes	%	±%
Liberal	John Rossiter	13,661	60.0	−5.0
Labor	Bill Walsh	6,106	26.8	+4.0
Democratic Labor	John Wagstaff	2,984	13.1	+0.9
Total formal votes		22,751	97.5	
Informal votes		584	2.5	
Turnout		23,335	93.4	
Two-party-preferred result
Liberal	John Rossiter	16,198	71.2	−4.2
Labor	Bill Walsh	6,553	28.8	+4.2
Liberal hold		Swing	−4.2	

=== Broadmeadows ===
1967 Victorian state election: Broadmeadows
Party	Candidate	Votes	%	±%
Labor	John Wilton	14,087	55.1	−1.0
Liberal	John Blaze	6,746	26.4	+1.9
Democratic Labor	Francis Dowling	4,721	18.5	−0.9
Total formal votes		25,554	95.9	
Informal votes		1,091	4.1	
Turnout		26,645	93.2	
Two-party-preferred result
Labor	John Wilton	14,795	57.9	+0.2
Liberal	John Blaze	10,759	42.1	−0.2
Labor hold		Swing	+0.2	

=== Brunswick East ===
1967 Victorian state election: Brunswick East
Party	Candidate	Votes	%	±%
Labor	Leo Fennessy	11,583	55.5	−0.4
Liberal	Anthony Wreford	4,952	23.7	+0.9
Democratic Labor	Peter McCabe	2,932	14.1	−5.8
Independent	John Daley	1,402	6.7	+6.7
Total formal votes		20,869	92.3	
Informal votes		1,737	7.7	
Turnout		22,606	92.7	
Two-party-preferred result
Labor	Leo Fennessy	12,773	61.0	+1.3
Liberal	Anthony Wreford	8,096	39.0	−1.3
Labor hold		Swing	+1.3	

=== Brunswick West ===
1967 Victorian state election: Brunswick West
Party	Candidate	Votes	%	±%
Labor	Campbell Turnbull	10,958	49.6	−0.1
Liberal	Victor French	6,877	31.2	+1.4
Democratic Labor	John Flint	4,245	19.2	−1.4
Total formal votes		22,080	95.8	
Informal votes		966	4.2	
Turnout		23,046	94.2	
Two-party-preferred result
Labor	Campbell Turnbull	11,304	51.2	−1.4
Liberal	Victor French	10,776	48.8	+1.4
Labor hold		Swing	−1.4	

=== Camberwell ===
1967 Victorian state election: Camberwell
Party	Candidate	Votes	%	±%
Liberal	Vernon Wilcox	13,508	59.7	−3.0
Labor	Adrianus Knulst	5,938	26.2	+2.2
Democratic Labor	Joseph Stanley	3,190	14.1	+0.8
Total formal votes		22,636	97.6	
Informal votes		548	2.4	
Turnout		23,184	92.8	
Two-party-preferred result
Liberal	Vernon Wilcox	16,219	71.7	−2.4
Labor	Adrianus Knulst	6,417	28.3	+2.4
Liberal hold		Swing	−2.4	

=== Caulfield ===
1967 Victorian state election: Caulfield
Party	Candidate	Votes	%	±%
Liberal	Edgar Tanner	11,834	50.9	−2.4
Labor	Bob Hogg	7,885	33.9	−0.4
Democratic Labor	Peter Grant	3,542	15.2	+3.6
Total formal votes		23,261	96.4	
Informal votes		870	3.6	
Turnout		24,131	91.9	
Two-party-preferred result
Liberal	Edgar Tanner	14,845	63.8	+0.1
Labor	Bob Hogg	8,416	36.2	−0.1
Liberal hold		Swing	+0.1	

=== Coburg ===
1967 Victorian state election: Coburg
Party	Candidate	Votes	%	±%
Labor	Bill Brown	8,680	39.8	−14.2
Liberal	Charles Symons	5,366	24.6	−1.7
Independent	Jack Mutton	4,548	20.9	+20.9
Democratic Labor	John Hardy	3,216	14.7	−5.0
Total formal votes		21,810	95.7	
Informal votes		982	4.3	
Turnout		22,792	95.5	
Two-party-preferred result
Labor	Bill Brown	12,940	59.3	−2.4
Liberal	Charles Symons	8,870	40.7	+2.4
Two-candidate-preferred result
Independent	Jack Mutton	12,480	58.8	+58.8
Labor	Bill Brown	8,727	41.2	−15.7
Independent gain from Labor		Swing	N/A	

=== Dandenong ===
1967 Victorian state election: Dandenong
Party	Candidate	Votes	%	±%
Labor	Alan Lind	10,632	43.0	+1.7
Liberal	Len Reid	10,294	41.6	0.0
Democratic Labor	Kevin Leydon	3,792	15.3	−0.7
Total formal votes		24,718	96.9	
Informal votes		781	3.1	
Turnout		25,499	95.5	
Two-party-preferred result
Liberal	Len Reid	13,158	53.2	−0.9
Labor	Alan Lind	11,560	46.8	+0.9
Liberal hold		Swing	−0.9	

=== Deer Park ===
1967 Victorian state election: Deer Park
Party	Candidate	Votes	%	±%
Labor	Jack Ginifer	14,265	53.2	+1.6
Liberal	Wallace More	7,101	26.5	+0.4
Democratic Labor	James Marmion	5,050	18.8	−3.6
Independent	Mervyn Kelly	398	1.5	+1.5
Total formal votes		26,814	94.5	
Informal votes		1,572	5.5	
Turnout		28,386	94.7	
Two-party-preferred result
Labor	Jack Ginifer	15,222	56.8	+2.0
Liberal	Wallace More	11,592	43.2	−2.0
Labor hold		Swing	+2.0	

=== Dromana ===
1967 Victorian state election: Dromana
Party	Candidate	Votes	%	±%
Liberal	Roberts Dunstan	9,949	55.3	−3.1
Labor	Barrie Rimmer	5,330	29.6	+1.9
Democratic Labor	Michael Kearney	1,710	9.5	−4.3
Country	William Weston	1,003	5.6	+5.6
Total formal votes		17,992	97.9	
Informal votes		376	2.1	
Turnout		18,368	94.1	
Two-party-preferred result
Liberal	Roberts Dunstan	12,306	68.4	−1.8
Labor	Barrie Rimmer	5,686	31.6	+1.8
Liberal hold		Swing	−1.8	

=== Dundas ===
1967 Victorian state election: Dundas
Party	Candidate	Votes	%	±%
Labor	Jack Jones	6,069	34.7	+12.3
Liberal	William McDonald	5,751	32.9	−4.6
Country	Reginald Fogarty	3,931	22.5	−7.3
Democratic Labor	James Eveston	1,753	10.0	−0.3
Total formal votes		17,504	98.2	
Informal votes		324	1.8	
Turnout		17,828	96.6	
Two-party-preferred result
Liberal	William McDonald	9,107	52.0	−15.6
Labor	Jack Jones	8,397	48.0	+15.6
Liberal hold		Swing	−15.6	

=== Essendon ===
1967 Victorian state election: Essendon
Party	Candidate	Votes	%	±%
Labor	Arthur Sanger	9,624	41.2	−1.2
Liberal	Kenneth Wheeler	9,216	39.5	+1.1
Democratic Labor	Kevin Digby	4,315	18.5	−0.8
Independent	Francis Zajac	181	0.8	+0.8
Total formal votes		23,986	98.2	
Informal votes		181	1.8	
Turnout		24,167	96.6	
Two-party-preferred result
Liberal	Kenneth Wheeler	12,929	55.4	+0.5
Labor	Arthur Sanger	10,407	44.6	−0.5
Liberal hold		Swing	+0.5	

=== Evelyn ===
1967 Victorian state election: Evelyn
Party	Candidate	Votes	%	±%
Liberal	Russell Stokes	7,457	41.7	−2.5
Labor	Arnold Hubbard	6,022	33.7	+3.1
Country	William Nankervis	2,352	13.1	+0.9
Democratic Labor	Audrey Walsh	1,633	9.1	−4.0
Independent	Henry Folan	433	2.4	+2.4
Total formal votes		17,897	96.7	
Informal votes		615	3.3	
Turnout		18,512	93.7	
Two-party-preferred result
Liberal	Russell Stokes	10,882	60.8	−4.2
Labor	Arnold Hubbard	7,015	39.2	+4.2
Liberal hold		Swing	−4.2	

=== Footscray ===
1967 Victorian state election: Footscray
Party	Candidate	Votes	%	±%
Labor	Bill Divers	14,433	65.2	+1.7
Democratic Labor	Robin Thomas	4,091	18.2	+5.2
Liberal	Graham Bungate	3,971	17.6	−1.9
Total formal votes		22,495	95.2	
Informal votes		1,145	4.8	
Turnout		23,640	94.8	
Two-party-preferred result
Labor	Bill Divers	15,047	67.9	−0.3
Liberal	Graham Bungate	7,448	32.1	+0.3
Labor hold		Swing	−0.3	

- The two candidate preferred vote was not counted between the Labor and DLP candidates for Footscray.

=== Frankston ===
1967 Victorian state election: Frankston
Party	Candidate	Votes	%	±%
Liberal	Edward Meagher	13,521	50.1	−3.1
Labor	Bruce Aitken	10,387	38.5	+4.8
Democratic Labor	John Cass	3,103	11.5	−1.7
Total formal votes		27,011	97.4	
Informal votes		714	2.6	
Turnout		27,725	94.4	
Two-party-preferred result
Liberal	Edward Meagher	16,159	59.8	−4.6
Labor	Bruce Aitken	10,852	40.2	+4.6
Liberal hold		Swing	−4.6	

=== Geelong ===
1967 Victorian state election: Geelong
Party	Candidate	Votes	%	±%
Liberal	Hayden Birrell	9,983	48.3	+0.8
Labor	Ronald McKenzie	7,944	38.4	−0.2
Democratic Labor	John Timberlake	2,761	13.4	−0.5
Total formal votes		20,688	97.7	
Informal votes		485	2.3	
Turnout		21,173	94.1	
Two-party-preferred result
Liberal	Hayden Birrell	12,326	59.6	−0.3
Labor	Ronald McKenzie	8,362	40.4	+0.3
Liberal hold		Swing	−0.3	

=== Geelong North ===
1967 Victorian state election: Geelong North
Party	Candidate	Votes	%	±%
Labor	Neil Trezise	12,746	59.1	+9.4
Liberal	Peter Lowe	6,094	28.2	−6.7
Democratic Labor	William Bond	2,740	12.7	−2.8
Total formal votes		21,580	97.1	
Informal votes		651	2.9	
Turnout		22,231	94.3	
Two-party-preferred result
Labor	Neil Trezise	13,157	61.0	+9.4
Liberal	Peter Lowe	8,423	39.0	−9.4
Labor hold		Swing	+9.4	

=== Gippsland East ===
1967 Victorian state election: Gippsland East
Party	Candidate	Votes	%	±%
Country	Bruce Evans	8,605	50.2	−13.4
Labor	Thomas Powell	3,683	21.5	+21.5
Liberal	Ronald Palmer	2,596	15.1	−6.4
Democratic Labor	Frank Burns	2,273	13.2	−1.7
Total formal votes		17,157	97.6	
Informal votes		423	2.4	
Turnout		17,580	94.1	
Two-party-preferred result
Country	Bruce Evans	12,874	75.0	+8.4
Labor	Thomas Powell	4,283	25.0	+25.0
Country hold		Swing	+8.4	

=== Gippsland South ===
1967 Victorian state election: Gippsland South
Party	Candidate	Votes	%	±%
Country	Herbert Hyland	9,716	57.3	−13.4
Labor	Derek Amos	3,075	18.1	+18.1
Liberal	Harold Suter	2,094	12.3	−2.2
Democratic Labor	Geoffrey Farrell	1,888	11.1	−3.7
Independent	John Mansfield	119	0.7	+0.7
Independent	John Routledge	69	0.4	+0.4
Total formal votes		16,961	96.6	
Informal votes		587	3.4	
Turnout		17,548	93.4	
Two-party-preferred result
Country	Herbert Hyland	13,299	78.4	+4.7
Labor	Derek Amos	3,662	21.6	+21.6
Country hold		Swing	+4.7	

=== Gippsland West ===
1967 Victorian state election: Gippsland West
Party	Candidate	Votes	%	±%
Country	Leslie Cochrane	5,862	34.9	−0.6
Liberal	Harry Marson	4,436	26.4	+0.8
Labor	Alastair MacKillop	4,337	25.8	0.0
Democratic Labor	Michael Houlihan	2,005	11.9	+0.4
Independent	Peter Milner	147	0.9	+0.9
Total formal votes		16,787	97.2	
Informal votes		491	2.8	
Turnout		17,278	95.6	
Two-party-preferred result
Country	Leslie Cochrane	11,882	71.0	+9.5
Labor	Alastair MacKillop	4,905	29.0	+29.0
Two-candidate-preferred result
Country	Leslie Cochrane	10,298	61.4	−0.1
Liberal	Harry Marson	6,489	38.6	+0.1
Country hold		Swing	−0.1	

=== Gisborne ===
1967 Victorian state election: Gisborne
Party	Candidate	Votes	%	±%
Liberal	Julian Doyle	7,398	42.2	+1.1
Labor	Michael Nolan	5,166	29.5	−5.8
Democratic Labor	John McMahon	2,872	16.4	−4.2
Country	George Duncan	1,847	10.5	+10.5
Independent	Peter Hatherley	61	0.4	+0.4
Independent	Derek Hobler	52	0.3	+0.3
Independent	Jeffrey Hatswell	49	0.3	+0.3
Independent	Warren Nicol	46	0.3	+0.3
Independent	Peter Kensett	25	0.1	+0.1
Total formal votes		17,516	94.9	
Informal votes		948	5.1	
Turnout		18,464	92.8	
Two-party-preferred result
Liberal	Julian Doyle	11,422	65.2	+3.4
Labor	Michael Nolan	6,094	34.8	−3.4
Liberal hold		Swing	+3.4	

=== Glen Iris ===
1967 Victorian state election: Glen Iris
Party	Candidate	Votes	%	±%
Liberal	Jim MacDonald	12,944	56.0	−6.5
Labor	Allan McDonald	6,779	29.4	+3.9
Democratic Labor	Kenneth Abbott	3,378	14.6	+2.6
Total formal votes		23,101	97.6	
Informal votes		565	2.4	
Turnout		23,666	94.2	
Two-party-preferred result
Liberal	Jim MacDonald	15,815	68.5	−4.3
Labor	Allan McDonald	7,286	31.5	+4.3
Liberal hold		Swing	−4.3	

=== Glenhuntly ===
1967 Victorian state election: Glenhuntly
Party	Candidate	Votes	%	±%
Liberal	Joe Rafferty	11,223	47.3	−4.1
Labor	Anthony Miller	9,108	38.4	+3.3
Democratic Labor	Raymond Studham	3,392	14.3	+0.9
Total formal votes		23,723	97.2	
Informal votes		678	2.8	
Turnout		24,401	93.6	
Two-party-preferred result
Liberal	Joe Rafferty	14,255	60.1	−2.8
Labor	Anthony Miller	9,468	39.9	+2.8
Liberal hold		Swing	−2.8	

=== Greensborough ===
1967 Victorian state election: Greensborough
Party	Candidate	Votes	%	±%
Labor	Bob Fell	11,487	42.8	+1.6
Liberal	Monte Vale	10,800	40.2	−2.9
Democratic Labor	Bill Barry	4,566	17.0	+1.3
Total formal votes		26,853	97.7	
Informal votes		629	2.3	
Turnout		27,482	94.3	
Two-party-preferred result
Liberal	Monte Vale	14,306	53.3	−1.7
Labor	Bob Fell	12,547	46.7	+1.7
Liberal hold		Swing	−1.7	

=== Hampden ===
1967 Victorian state election: Hampden
Party	Candidate	Votes	%	±%
Liberal	Henry Bolte	7,564	44.6	−9.1
Labor	Fred Rowe	4,201	24.8	−5.9
Country	Gilbert Anderson	2,876	17.0	+14.5
Democratic Labor	Francis O'Brien	1,629	9.6	−3.4
Liberal Reform Group	Ian McQuie	491	2.9	+2.9
Independent	Glynne Wheler	186	1.1	+1.1
Total formal votes		16,947	97.1	
Informal votes		508	2.9	
Turnout		17,455	96.6	
Two-party-preferred result
Liberal	Henry Bolte	12,164	71.8	+5.0
Labor	Fred Rowe	4,783	28.2	−5.0
Liberal hold		Swing	+5.0	

=== Hawthorn ===
1967 Victorian state election: Hawthorn
Party	Candidate	Votes	%	±%
Liberal	Walter Jona	10,722	47.7	+3.7
Labor	Dolph Eddy	7,968	35.5	−0.1
Democratic Labor	Daniel Condon	3,766	16.8	+3.3
Total formal votes		22,456	96.8	
Informal votes		738	3.2	
Turnout		23,194	93.0	
Two-party-preferred result
Liberal	Walter Jona	13,390	59.6	−0.6
Labor	Dolph Eddy	9,066	40.4	+0.6
Liberal hold		Swing	−0.6	

=== Heatherton ===
1967 Victorian state election: Heatherton
Party	Candidate	Votes	%	±%
Labor	Keith Ewert	10,467	42.7	−0.2
Liberal	Norman Billing	10,395	42.4	+2.3
Democratic Labor	Joseph O'Neill	3,663	14.9	−1.1
Total formal votes		24,525	96.8	
Informal votes		799	3.2	
Turnout		25,324	94.4	
Two-party-preferred result
Liberal	Norman Billing	13,196	53.8	+1.1
Labor	Keith Ewert	11,329	46.2	−1.1
Liberal hold		Swing	+1.1	

=== Ivanhoe ===
1967 Victorian state election: Ivanhoe
Party	Candidate	Votes	%	±%
Liberal	Vernon Christie	10,254	43.1	+0.7
Labor	Thomas Rich	9,545	40.1	−0.9
Democratic Labor	Cyril Cummins	3,365	14.1	−2.5
Independent	Bruce Graham	642	2.7	+2.7
Total formal votes		23,806	97.5	
Informal votes		604	2.5	
Turnout		24,410	94.2	
Two-party-preferred result
Liberal	Vernon Christie	13,604	57.2	+0.6
Labor	Thomas Rich	10,202	42.8	−0.6
Liberal hold		Swing	+0.6	

=== Kara Kara ===
1967 Victorian state election: Kara Kara
Party	Candidate	Votes	%	±%
Country	Bill Phelan	6,078	36.8	+8.0
Labor	George Jeffs	4,429	26.8	+2.0
Liberal	Alexander Lee	4,379	26.5	−9.9
Democratic Labor	Bruno D'elia	1,620	9.8	−0.2
Total formal votes		16,506	98.9	
Informal votes		191	1.1	
Turnout		16,697	96.3	
Two-party-preferred result
Country	Bill Phelan	11,393	69.0	
Labor	George Jeffs	5,113	31.0	
Two-candidate-preferred result
Country	Bill Phelan	10,325	62.6	+9.6
Liberal	Alexander Lee	6,181	37.4	−9.6
Country hold		Swing	+9.6	

=== Kew ===
1967 Victorian state election: Kew
Party	Candidate	Votes	%	±%
Liberal	Arthur Rylah	12,712	54.6	−3.3
Labor	Eric Sibly	6,261	26.9	+0.6
Democratic Labor	Francis Duffy	4,305	18.5	+2.7
Total formal votes		23,278	97.2	
Informal votes		664	2.8	
Turnout		23,942	93.4	
Two-party-preferred result
Liberal	Arthur Rylah	16,372	70.3	−1.1
Labor	Eric Sibly	6,906	29.7	+1.1
Liberal hold		Swing	−1.1	

=== Lowan ===
1967 Victorian state election: Lowan
Party	Candidate	Votes	%	±%
Liberal	Jim McCabe	7,181	40.1	+2.3
Country	Ray Buckley	6,024	33.6	−16.7
Labor	Roslyn Snow	3,715	20.7	+17.1
Democratic Labor	Michael Grimes	1,007	5.6	−2.7
Total formal votes		17,927	98.6	
Informal votes		260	1.4	
Turnout		18,187	96.9	
Two-party-preferred result
Country	Ray Buckley	13,439	75.0	
Labor	Roslyn Snow	4,488	25.0	
Two-candidate-preferred result
Country	Ray Buckley	9,448	52.7	−3.3
Liberal	Jim McCabe	8,479	47.3	+3.3
Country gain from Liberal		Swing	−3.3	

- In the redistribution, Lowan became a notionally Country party held seat.

=== Malvern ===
1967 Victorian state election: Malvern
Party	Candidate	Votes	%	±%
Liberal	John Bloomfield	14,703	63.6	−2.3
Labor	Thomas Evans	5,522	23.9	+0.6
Democratic Labor	John Olle	2,896	12.5	+1.6
Total formal votes		23,121	97.4	
Informal votes		610	2.6	
Turnout		23,731	91.1	
Two-party-preferred result
Liberal	John Bloomfield	17,164	74.2	−1.0
Labor	Thomas Evans	5,957	25.8	+1.0
Liberal hold		Swing	−1.0	

=== Melbourne ===
1967 Victorian state election: Melbourne
Party	Candidate	Votes	%	±%
Labor	Arthur Clarey	12,904	59.6	+2.7
Liberal	Anthony Gilligan	5,436	25.1	−0.4
Democratic Labor	James Whitehead	3,302	15.3	−2.3
Total formal votes		21,642	94.2	
Informal votes		1,329	5.8	
Turnout		22,971	88.7	
Two-party-preferred result
Labor	Arthur Clarey	13,399	61.9	+3.5
Liberal	Anthony Gilligan	8,243	38.1	−3.5
Labor hold		Swing	+3.5	

=== Mentone ===
1967 Victorian state election: Mentone
Party	Candidate	Votes	%	±%
Liberal	Bill Templeton	9,691	41.9	+4.3
Labor	Nola Barber	9,612	41.6	−6.5
Democratic Labor	George White	3,212	13.9	−0.4
Independent	Clifford Baragwanath	612	2.7	+2.7
Total formal votes		23,127	97.3	
Informal votes		635	2.7	
Turnout		23,762	94.7	
Two-party-preferred result
Liberal	Bill Templeton	12,789	55.3	+4.6
Labor	Nola Barber	10,338	44.7	−4.6
Liberal hold		Swing	+4.6	

=== Midlands ===
1967 Victorian state election: Midlands
Party	Candidate	Votes	%	±%
Labor	Clive Stoneham	9,615	46.1	−3.7
Liberal	Douglas Johanson	5,695	27.3	−8.8
Country	Graham Brownbill	3,148	15.1	+15.1
Democratic Labor	James Bourke	2,000	9.6	−4.2
Independent	Arthur Bailey	403	1.9	+1.9
Total formal votes		20,861	97.3	
Informal votes		573	2.7	
Turnout		21,434	93.0	
Two-party-preferred result
Labor	Clive Stoneham	10,634	51.0	−1.2
Liberal	Douglas Johanson	10,227	49.0	+1.2
Labor hold		Swing	−1.2	

=== Mildura ===
1967 Victorian state election: Mildura
Party	Candidate	Votes	%	±%
Country	Milton Whiting	8,514	50.5	+2.3
Labor	Lance Fraser	5,093	30.2	−2.0
Democratic Labor	John Conroy	1,749	10.4	+1.2
Liberal	Bruce Wright	1,506	8.9	−1.5
Total formal votes		16,862	97.1	
Informal votes		506	2.9	
Turnout		17,368	95.6	
Two-party-preferred result
Country	Milton Whiting	11,356	67.4	+2.0
Labor	Lance Fraser	5,506	32.6	−2.0
Country hold		Swing	+2.0	

=== Mitcham ===
1967 Victorian state election: Mitcham
Party	Candidate	Votes	%	±%
Liberal	Dorothy Goble	11,329	45.7	−4.2
Labor	Graham Walsh	10,203	41.2	+5.8
Democratic Labor	Gerald Shinnick	3,231	13.1	−1.6
Total formal votes		24,763	97.9	
Informal votes		534	2.1	
Turnout		25,297	95.2	
Two-party-preferred result
Liberal	Dorothy Goble	14,116	57.0	−5.5
Labor	Graham Walsh	10,647	43.0	+5.5
Liberal hold		Swing	−5.5	

=== Monbulk ===
1967 Victorian state election: Monbulk
Party	Candidate	Votes	%	±%
Liberal	Bill Borthwick	11,621	50.9	−2.6
Labor	Margaret Howells	8,290	36.3	+0.8
Democratic Labor	Noel Clarke	2,642	11.6	+0.5
Independent	Ronald Pike	290	1.3	+1.3
Total formal votes		22,843	96.8	
Informal votes		750	3.2	
Turnout		23,593	93.7	
Two-party-preferred result
Liberal	Bill Borthwick	14,012	61.3	−1.6
Labor	Margaret Howells	8,831	38.7	+1.6
Liberal hold		Swing	−1.6	

=== Moonee Ponds ===
1967 Victorian state election: Moonee Ponds
Party	Candidate	Votes	%	±%
Labor	Tom Edmunds	11,280	47.6	+1.4
Liberal	Jack Holden	7,716	32.5	−3.4
Democratic Labor	Barry O'Brien	3,554	15.0	−2.8
Independent	Lancelot Hutchinson	1,165	4.9	+4.9
Total formal votes		23,715	96.1	
Informal votes		960	3.9	
Turnout		24,675	94.2	
Two-party-preferred result
Labor	Tom Edmunds	12,168	51.3	+4.2
Liberal	Jack Holden	11,547	48.7	−4.2
Labor gain from Liberal		Swing	+4.2	

=== Moorabbin ===
1967 Victorian state election: Moorabbin
Party	Candidate	Votes	%	±%
Liberal	Llew Reese	11,104	46.1	−0.7
Labor	Harry Rourke	9,115	37.9	−1.4
Democratic Labor	Richard Neilson	3,860	16.0	+2.7
Total formal votes		24,079	97.5	
Informal votes		613	2.5	
Turnout		24,692	94.4	
Two-party-preferred result
Liberal	Llew Reese	14,658	60.9	+2.2
Labor	Harry Rourke	9,421	39.1	−2.2
Liberal hold		Swing	+2.2	

=== Morwell ===
1967 Victorian state election: Morwell
Party	Candidate	Votes	%	±%
Labor	Colin Pratt	8,804	41.8	+14.6
Country	John Vinall	5,070	24.1	−9.7
Liberal	Archie Tanner	4,373	20.8	−4.4
Democratic Labor	Thomas Lawless	2,808	13.3	−0.6
Total formal votes		21,055	97.3	
Informal votes		575	2.7	
Turnout		21,630	95.6	
Two-party-preferred result
Liberal	Archie Tanner	10,793	51.3	−13.5
Labor	Colin Pratt	10,262	48.7	+13.5
Liberal hold		Swing	−13.5	

=== Murray Valley ===
1967 Victorian state election: Murray Valley
Party	Candidate	Votes	%	±%
Country	George Moss	9,255	53.6	−7.4
Labor	Robert Cross	3,265	18.9	+12.5
Liberal	Albert Baker	2,580	14.9	+0.4
Democratic Labor	John Patterson	2,167	12.6	−5.5
Total formal votes		17,267	96.9	
Informal votes		543	3.1	
Turnout		17,810	94.5	
Two-party-preferred result
Country	George Moss	13,419	77.7	+7.2
Labor	Robert Cross	3,848	22.3	+22.3
Country hold		Swing	+7.2	

=== Narracan ===
1967 Victorian state election: Narracan
Party	Candidate	Votes	%	±%
Liberal	Jim Balfour	8,243	40.1	+5.6
Labor	George Wragg	6,267	30.5	0.0
Country	Daniel Vaughan	3,667	17.9	−4.2
Democratic Labor	Peter Saunders	2,367	11.5	−1.4
Total formal votes		20,544	97.6	
Informal votes		504	2.4	
Turnout		21,048	95.9	
Two-party-preferred result
Liberal	Jim Balfour	13,568	66.0	+0.5
Labor	George Wragg	6,976	34.0	−0.5
Liberal hold		Swing	+0.5	

=== Northcote ===
1967 Victorian state election: Northcote
Party	Candidate	Votes	%	±%
Labor	Frank Wilkes	12,121	54.1	+0.7
Liberal	Peter Falconer	6,748	30.1	−0.2
Democratic Labor	Jack Little	3,527	15.8	−0.5
Total formal votes		22,396	96.2	
Informal votes		877	3.8	
Turnout		23,273	94.7	
Two-party-preferred result
Labor	Frank Wilkes	12,650	56.5	+0.8
Liberal	Peter Falconer	9,746	43.5	−0.8
Labor hold		Swing	+0.8	

=== Oakleigh ===
1967 Victorian state election: Oakleigh
Party	Candidate	Votes	%	±%
Liberal	Alan Scanlan	10,598	46.1	+1.8
Labor	Glenn Dudley	9,310	40.5	−0.3
Democratic Labor	Bernard Slattery	3,066	13.4	−0.7
Total formal votes		22,974	97.3	
Informal votes		631	2.7	
Turnout		23,605	95.1	
Two-party-preferred result
Liberal	Alan Scanlan	13,327	58.0	+0.5
Labor	Glenn Dudley	9,647	42.0	−0.5
Liberal hold		Swing	+0.5	

=== Polwarth ===
1967 Victorian state election: Polwarth
Party	Candidate	Votes	%	±%
Liberal	Tom Darcy	8,201	48.8	−11.7
Labor	Alfred Cartwright	3,320	19.8	−4.3
Country	John McCue	3,168	18.9	+18.9
Democratic Labor	Leonard Eyre	2,112	12.6	−2.8
Total formal votes		16,801	97.7	
Informal votes		390	2.3	
Turnout		17,191	96.8	
Two-party-preferred result
Liberal	Tom Darcy	13,031	77.6	+3.9
Labor	Alfred Cartwright	3,770	22.4	−3.9
Liberal hold		Swing	+3.9	

=== Portland ===
1967 Victorian state election: Portland
Party	Candidate	Votes	%	±%
Labor	Bob McClure	5,638	32.7	−2.2
Liberal	Don McKellar	5,017	29.1	−3.3
Country	Clive Mitchell	4,966	28.8	+5.6
Democratic Labor	Frederick Baulch	1,641	9.5	0.0
Total formal votes		17,262	98.1	
Informal votes		338	1.9	
Turnout		17,600	96.6	
Two-party-preferred result
Liberal	Don McKellar	9,246	53.6	−5.2
Labor	Bob McClure	8,016	46.4	+5.2
Liberal hold		Swing	−5.2	

=== Prahran ===
1967 Victorian state election: Prahran
Party	Candidate	Votes	%	±%
Liberal	Sam Loxton	9,845	44.4	+0.1
Labor	John Dyer	7,902	35.6	−9.2
Independent	George Gahan	2,378	10.7	+10.7
Democratic Labor	Gavan Grimes	1,906	8.6	−2.3
Independent	John Ketelhorn	148	0.7	+0.7
Total formal votes		22,179	95.0	
Informal votes		1,159	5.0	
Turnout		23,338	89.6	
Two-party-preferred result
Liberal	Sam Loxton	11,934	53.8	+0.2
Labor	John Dyer	10,245	46.2	−0.2
Liberal hold		Swing	+0.2	

=== Preston ===
1967 Victorian state election: Preston
Party	Candidate	Votes	%	±%
Labor	Charlie Ring	11,395	50.8	−2.5
Liberal	James Spicer	6,936	30.9	+3.2
Democratic Labor	Maurice Horwood	4,115	18.3	−0.3
Total formal votes		22,446	95.6	
Informal votes		1,029	4.4	
Turnout		23,475	95.4	
Two-party-preferred result
Labor	Charlie Ring	12,013	53.5	−2.8
Liberal	James Spicer	10,433	46.5	+2.8
Labor hold		Swing	−2.8	

=== Reservoir ===
1967 Victorian state election: Reservoir
Party	Candidate	Votes	%	±%
Labor	Harry Jenkins	12,994	55.1	−0.1
Liberal	Peter Allaway	6,561	27.8	+3.6
Democratic Labor	Frederick Whitling	3,427	14.5	−2.6
Communist	William Barnes	444	1.9	−1.6
Independent	James Christie	148	0.6	+0.6
Total formal votes		23,574	95.8	
Informal votes		1,036	4.2	
Turnout		24,610	95.9	
Two-party-preferred result
Labor	Harry Jenkins	13,983	59.3	−0.8
Liberal	Peter Allaway	9,591	40.7	+0.8
Labor hold		Swing	−0.8	

=== Richmond ===
1967 Victorian state election: Richmond
Party	Candidate	Votes	%	±%
Labor	Clyde Holding	12,435	61.4	−1.9
Democratic Labor	James Abikhair	4,541	22.4	+3.6
Liberal	Graham Jackson	3,265	16.1	−1.0
Total formal votes		20,241	93.9	
Informal votes		1,308	6.1	
Turnout		21,549	91.3	
Two-party-preferred result
Labor	Clyde Holding	13,116	64.8	−1.6
Liberal	Graham Jackson	7,125	35.2	+1.6
Labor hold		Swing	−1.6	

- The two candidate preferred vote was not counted between the Labor and DLP candidates for Richmond.

=== Ringwood ===
1967 Victorian state election: Ringwood
Party	Candidate	Votes	%	±%
Liberal	Jim Manson	12,374	50.3	−2.6
Labor	Norma Sweetman	8,614	35.0	+1.4
Democratic Labor	Graeme Madigan	3,586	14.6	+1.1
Total formal votes		24,574	97.6	
Informal votes		607	2.4	
Turnout		25,181	94.4	
Two-party-preferred result
Liberal	Jim Manson	15,421	62.8	−1.7
Labor	Norma Sweetman	9,153	37.2	+1.7
Liberal hold		Swing	−1.7	

=== Rodney ===
1967 Victorian state election: Rodney
Party	Candidate	Votes	%	±%
Country	Russell McDonald	10,390	59.0	−0.8
Liberal	Peter Gibson	2,673	15.2	−10.1
Democratic Labor	Augustine McCormick	2,330	13.2	−1.7
Labor	David Bornstein	2,228	12.6	+12.6
Total formal votes		17,621	97.4	
Informal votes		461	2.6	
Turnout		18,082	96.9	
Two-party-preferred result
Country	Russell McDonald	14,777	83.9	+21.2
Labor	David Bornstein	2,844	16.1	+16.1
Country hold		Swing	+21.2	

- The two candidate preferred vote was not counted between the Country and Liberal candidates for Rodney.

=== St Kilda ===
1967 Victorian state election: St Kilda
Party	Candidate	Votes	%	±%
Liberal	Brian Dixon	11,906	51.5	+2.2
Labor	Brian Zouch	8,326	36.0	−1.8
Democratic Labor	John Hughes	2,870	12.4	−0.5
Total formal votes		23,102	95.9	
Informal votes		975	4.1	
Turnout		24,077	89.4	
Two-party-preferred result
Liberal	Brian Dixon	14,346	62.1	+1.8
Labor	Brian Zouch	8,756	37.9	−1.8
Liberal hold		Swing	+1.8	

=== Sandringham ===
1967 Victorian state election: Sandringham
Party	Candidate	Votes	%	±%
Liberal	Murray Porter	12,515	54.0	−1.2
Labor	Kevin Vaughan	7,515	32.4	+1.1
Democratic Labor	William Leech	3,144	13.6	+1.2
Total formal votes		23,174	97.7	
Informal votes		548	2.3	
Turnout		23,722	93.5	
Two-party-preferred result
Liberal	Murray Porter	15,188	65.5	−0.7
Labor	Kevin Vaughan	7,986	34.5	+0.7
Liberal hold		Swing	−0.7	

=== Scoresby ===
1967 Victorian state election: Scoresby
Party	Candidate	Votes	%	±%
Liberal	Geoff Hayes	12,078	44.7	−3.5
Labor	Caroline Wilder	10,320	38.2	+1.3
Democratic Labor	Barry Brindle	4,629	17.1	+2.2
Total formal votes		27,027	97.3	
Informal votes		735	2.7	
Turnout		27,762	94.9	
Two-party-preferred result
Liberal	Geoff Hayes	16,222	60.0	−0.9
Labor	Caroline Wilder	10,805	40.0	+0.9
Liberal hold		Swing	−0.9	

=== Shepparton ===
1967 Victorian state election: Shepparton
Party	Candidate	Votes	%	±%
Country	Peter Ross-Edwards	6,206	36.0	−19.2
Independent	Bill Hunter	3,042	17.7	+17.7
Labor	Neil Frankland	3,042	17.7	+17.7
Liberal	Thomas Gribben	2,969	17.2	−9.7
Democratic Labor	Bruce Morison	1,974	11.4	−6.5
Total formal votes		17,233	94.7	
Informal votes		958	5.3	
Turnout		18,191	96.1	
Two-party-preferred result
Country	Peter Ross-Edwards	13,374	77.6	
Labor	Neil Frankland	3,859	22.4	
Two-candidate-preferred result
Country	Peter Ross-Edwards	8,952	51.9	−6.9
Independent	Bill Hunter	8,281	48.1	+48.1
Country hold		Swing	−6.9	

=== Sunshine ===
1967 Victorian state election: Sunshine
Party	Candidate	Votes	%	±%
Labor	Denis Lovegrove	13,223	58.3	−6.3
Liberal	Peter Ross	4,863	21.4	+2.5
Democratic Labor	Robert Charles	3,728	16.4	−0.2
Independent	Roy Hartley	854	3.8	+3.8
Total formal votes		22,668	95.0	
Informal votes		1,199	5.0	
Turnout		23,867	93.1	
Two-party-preferred result
Labor	Denis Lovegrove	14,209	62.7	−4.2
Liberal	Peter Ross	8,459	37.3	+4.2
Labor hold		Swing	−4.2	

=== Swan Hill ===
1967 Victorian state election: Swan Hill
Party	Candidate	Votes	%	±%
Country	Harold Stirling	9,842	57.2	−0.8
Democratic Labor	John Carty	2,865	16.6	+5.5
Labor	Robert Dorning	2,522	14.7	−8.6
Liberal	Bernard Treseder	1,985	11.5	+3.9
Total formal votes		17,214	97.6	
Informal votes		417	2.4	
Turnout		17,631	95.6	
Two-party-preferred result
Country	Harold Stirling	14,064	81.7	+7.0
Labor	Robert Dorning	3,150	18.3	−7.0
Country hold		Swing	+7.0	

=== Syndal ===
1967 Victorian state election: Syndal
Party	Candidate	Votes	%	±%
Liberal	Ray Wiltshire	13,400	50.0	−4.0
Labor	Robert Fordham	9,634	35.9	+4.2
Democratic Labor	John Rose	3,761	14.0	−0.4
Total formal votes		26,795	97.9	
Informal votes		567	2.1	
Turnout		27,362	95.3	
Two-party-preferred result
Liberal	Ray Wiltshire	16,597	62.0	−4.3
Labor	Robert Fordham	10,198	38.0	+4.3
Liberal hold		Swing	−4.3	

=== Warrnambool ===
1967 Victorian state election: Warrnambool
Party	Candidate	Votes	%	±%
Liberal	Ian Smith	5,064	28.6	−13.9
Labor	Vincent Ayres	4,404	24.9	−2.3
Democratic Labor	Patrick Bourke	3,824	21.6	−0.2
Country	Cyril Boyle	2,655	15.0	+6.6
Independent	George Gibbs	1,759	9.9	+9.9
Total formal votes		17,706	98.0	
Informal votes		352	2.0	
Turnout		18,058	96.7	
Two-party-preferred result
Liberal	Ian Smith	12,285	69.4	+0.5
Labor	Vincent Ayres	5,421	30.6	−0.5
Liberal hold		Swing	+0.5	

=== Williamstown ===
1967 Victorian state election: Williamstown
Party	Candidate	Votes	%	±%
Labor	Larry Floyd	14,591	61.4	0.0
Democratic Labor	John Bacon	5,113	21.5	+3.9
Liberal	Robert Lawson	3,077	12.9	−7.2
Communist	Ian Daykin	999	4.2	+3.3
Total formal votes		23,780	95.2	
Informal votes		1,205	4.8	
Turnout		24,985	94.0	
Two-party-preferred result
Labor	Larry Floyd	16,257	68.4	+3.8
Liberal	Robert Lawson	7,523	31.6	−3.8
Labor hold		Swing	+3.8	

- The two candidate preferred vote was not counted between the Labor and DLP candidates for Williamstown.

== See also ==
- 1967 Victorian state election
- Members of the Victorian Legislative Assembly, 1967–1970
