= Results of the 1976 Victorian state election (Legislative Assembly) =

Australian state election results

Victorian state election, 20 March 1976 Legislative Assembly << 1973–1979 >>
Enrolled voters	2,267,282				
Votes cast	2,101,414		Turnout	92.68	-0.86
Informal votes	53,417		Informal	2.54	-0.36
Summary of votes by party
Party	Primary votes	%	Swing	Seats	Change
Liberal	939,481	45.87	+3.53	52	+6
Labor	869,021	42.43	+0.82	21	+3
National	144,818	7.07	+1.13	7	-1
Democratic Labor	52,765	2.58	-5.22	0	±0
Independent	35,408	1.73	+1.18	1	±0
Other	6,504	0.32	-1.43	0	±0
Total	2,047,997			81	
Two-party-preferred
Liberal	1,142,262	55.8	+0.6		
Labor	905,735	44.2	–0.6		

This is a list of electoral district results for the Victorian 1976 election.

== Results by electoral district ==
=== Albert Park ===
1976 Victorian state election: Albert Park
Party	Candidate	Votes	%	±%
Labor	Val Doube	16,518	63.1	+3.4
Liberal	Timothy Hinchcliffe	9,644	36.9	+4.1
Total formal votes		26,162	96.1	
Informal votes		970	3.9	
Turnout		27,132	85.7	
Labor hold		Swing	+2.5	

=== Ascot Vale ===
1976 Victorian state election: Ascot Vale
Party	Candidate	Votes	%	±%
Labor	Tom Edmunds	16,445	63.3	+3.9
Liberal	Edmond Murphy	9,535	36.7	+5.9
Total formal votes		25,980	96.1	
Informal votes		1,043	3.9	
Turnout		27,023	92.4	
Labor hold		Swing	+2.9	

=== Ballarat North ===
1976 Victorian state election: Ballarat North
Party	Candidate	Votes	%	±%
Liberal	Tom Evans	13,702	56.8	+4.1
Labor	Jeremy Harper	9,057	37.5	−1.5
Democratic Labor	Dennis O'Reilly	1,369	5.7	−2.3
Total formal votes		24,128	98.3	
Informal votes		416	1.7	
Turnout		24,544	95.3	
Two-party-preferred result
Liberal	Tom Evans	14,934	61.9	+1.9
Labor	Jeremy Harper	9,194	38.1	−1.9
Liberal hold		Swing	+1.9	

=== Ballarat South ===
1976 Victorian state election: Ballarat South
Party	Candidate	Votes	%	±%
Liberal	Bill Stephen	12,985	54.1	+11.4
Labor	Frank Sheehan	11,001	45.9	+4.1
Total formal votes		23,986	97.4	
Informal votes		635	2.6	
Turnout		24,621	94.8	
Liberal hold		Swing	+0.3	

=== Balwyn ===
1976 Victorian state election: Balwyn
Party	Candidate	Votes	%	±%
Liberal	Jim Ramsay	16,775	63.5	0.0
Labor	Paul Gibson	7,399	28.0	−2.2
Democratic Labor	John Hansen	1,190	4.5	−1.8
Australia	Peter King	1,053	4.0	+4.0
Total formal votes		26,417	98.4	
Informal votes		425	1.6	
Turnout		26,842	92.2	
Two-party-preferred result
Liberal	Jim Ramsay	18,299	69.3	+0.2
Labor	Paul Gibson	8,118	30.7	−0.2
Liberal hold		Swing	+0.2	

=== Benalla ===
1976 Victorian state election: Benalla
Party	Candidate	Votes	%	±%
National	Tom Trewin	10,160	44.1	+10.7
Labor	John Dennis	6,205	26.9	−3.6
Liberal	Leo Gorman	5,188	22.5	−3.9
Democratic Labor	Christopher Cody	1,495	6.5	−3.0
Total formal votes		23,048	98.4	
Informal votes		378	1.6	
Turnout		23,426	93.8	
Two-party-preferred result
National	Tom Trewin	16,156	70.1	+3.9
Labor	John Dennis	6,892	29.9	−3.9
National hold		Swing	+3.9	

=== Benambra ===
1976 Victorian state election: Benambra
Party	Candidate	Votes	%	±%
National	Bill Baxter	8,581	36.6	−6.2
Liberal	Lou Lieberman	6,107	26.0	+4.0
Labor	Ken Coghill	5,632	24.0	−3.9
Independent	Robert Wiltshire	2,729	11.6	+11.6
Democratic Labor	Kevin Redfern	420	1.8	−5.4
Total formal votes		23,469	97.8	
Informal votes		530	2.2	
Turnout		23,999	92.6	
Two-candidate-preferred result
Liberal	Lou Lieberman	12,167	51.8	+51.8
National	Bill Baxter	11,302	48.2	−21.7
Liberal gain from National		Swing	N/A	

=== Bendigo ===
1976 Victorian state election: Bendigo
Party	Candidate	Votes	%	±%
Liberal	Daryl McClure	13,021	53.6	+15.6
Labor	Esmond Curnow	11,290	46.4	−0.5
Total formal votes		24,625	98.7	
Informal votes		314	1.3	
Turnout		24,625	95.8	
Liberal hold		Swing	+1.6	

=== Bennettswood ===
1976 Victorian state election: Bennettswood
Party	Candidate	Votes	%	±%
Liberal	Ian McLaren	14,732	55.3	+2.1
Labor	Peter Bruce	10,471	39.3	−0.9
Democratic Labor	James Tighe	1,430	5.4	−1.2
Total formal votes		26,633	98.2	
Informal votes		477	1.8	
Turnout		27,110	94.2	
Two-party-preferred result
Liberal	Ian McLaren	16,019	60.1	+1.0
Labor	Peter Bruce	10,614	39.9	−1.0
Liberal hold		Swing	+1.0	

=== Bentleigh ===
1976 Victorian state election: Bentleigh
Party	Candidate	Votes	%	±%
Liberal	Bob Suggett	14,183	52.8	+0.1
Labor	Lindsay Thomas	10,434	38.9	−0.3
Democratic Labor	Peter Madden	1,532	5.7	−2.3
Workers	John Stoker	693	2.6	+2.6
Total formal votes		26,842	98.0	
Informal votes		539	2.0	
Turnout		27,381	94.2	
Two-party-preferred result
Liberal	Bob Suggett	15,917	59.3	−0.6
Labor	Lindsay Thomas	10,925	40.7	+0.6
Liberal hold		Swing	−0.6	

=== Berwick ===
1976 Victorian state election: Berwick
Party	Candidate	Votes	%	±%
Liberal	Rob Maclellan	12,454	50.1	−2.9
Labor	Judith Wallace	8,272	33.3	−0.9
National	Ronald Irwin	2,844	11.4	+6.4
Democratic Labor	Michael Houlihan	1,303	5.2	−1.9
Total formal votes		24,873	98.3	
Informal votes		439	1.7	
Turnout		25,312	92.1	
Two-party-preferred result
Liberal	Rob Maclellan	16,187	65.1	+1.3
Labor	Judith Wallace	8,686	34.9	−1.3
Liberal hold		Swing	+1.3	

=== Box Hill ===
1976 Victorian state election: Box Hill
Party	Candidate	Votes	%	±%
Liberal	Donald Mackinnon	14,089	53.8	+5.0
Labor	Howard Hodgens	10,191	38.9	−0.2
Democratic Labor	James Brosnan	1,890	7.2	+0.9
Total formal votes		26,170	97.9	
Informal votes		550	2.1	
Turnout		26,720	92.6	
Two-party-preferred result
Liberal	Donald Mackinnon	15,601	59.6	+2.5
Labor	Howard Hodgens	10,869	40.4	−2.5
Liberal hold		Swing	+2.5	

=== Brighton ===
1976 Victorian state election: Brighton
Party	Candidate	Votes	%	±%
Liberal	Jeannette Patrick	15,925	61.8	+3.9
Labor	Robert Gerrand	7,404	28.7	+0.3
Australia	Ian Mullins	1,267	4.9	+4.9
Democratic Labor	Peter Lawlor	1,168	4.5	−0.9
Total formal votes		25,764	98.1	
Informal votes		492	1.9	
Turnout		26,256	92.3	
Two-party-preferred result
Liberal	Jeannette Patrick	17,533	68.1	−0.3
Labor	Robert Gerrand	8,231	31.9	+0.3
Liberal hold		Swing	−0.3	

=== Broadmeadows ===
1976 Victorian state election: Broadmeadows
Party	Candidate	Votes	%	±%
Labor	John Wilton	16,613	63.2	+3.9
Liberal	Ronald McClelland	9,663	36.8	+8.5
Total formal votes		26,276	95.3	
Informal votes		1,298	4.7	
Turnout		27,574	92.8	
Labor hold		Swing	+2.6	

=== Brunswick ===
1976 Victorian state election: Brunswick
Party	Candidate	Votes	%	±%
Labor	Tom Roper	15,731	62.5	+4.2
Liberal	Alfredos Kouris	7,037	28.0	+0.3
Independent	Stephen Cope	744	3.0	+3.0
Independent	Marian Kermonde	314	1.3	+1.3
Independent	Grahame Kermonde	287	1.1	+1.1
Independent	Robert Douglas	282	1.1	+1.1
Independent	Leslie Johns	248	1.0	+1.0
Independent	Angelo Russo	238	1.0	+1.0
Independent	Anthony Errichiello	208	0.8	+0.8
Independent	Ronald Moran	65	0.3	+0.3
Total formal votes		25,154	94.3	
Informal votes		1,524	5.7	
Turnout		26,678	90.5	
Two-party-preferred result
Labor	Tom Roper	16,286	64.7	+2.7
Liberal	Alfredos Kouris	8,868	35.3	−2.7
Labor hold		Swing	+2.7	

=== Bundoora ===
1976 Victorian state election: Bundoora
Party	Candidate	Votes	%	±%
Labor	John Cain	14,030	53.3	+4.2
Liberal	Dorothy Baker	12,292	46.7	+8.9
Total formal votes		26,322	97.7	
Informal votes		625	2.3	
Turnout		26,947	93.9	
Labor hold		Swing	+0.6	

=== Burwood ===
1976 Victorian state election: Burwood
Party	Candidate	Votes	%	±%
Liberal	Jeff Kennett	14,926	57.8	−0.9
Labor	Douglas Bennett	8,761	34.0	+3.4
Democratic Labor	Joseph Stanley	1,680	6.5	−0.9
Workers	Michael Boffa	437	1.7	+1.7
Total formal votes		25,804	98.4	
Informal votes		412	1.6	
Turnout		26,216	92.9	
Two-party-preferred result
Liberal	Jeff Kennett	16,679	64.6	−2.2
Labor	Douglas Bennett	9,125	35.4	+2.2
Liberal hold		Swing	−2.2	

=== Carrum ===
1976 Victorian state election: Carrum
Party	Candidate	Votes	%	±%
Labor	Ian Cathie	14,137	55.0	+3.7
Liberal	Allan Coombes	11,572	45.0	+5.4
Total formal votes		25,709	97.2	
Informal votes		731	2.8	
Turnout		26,440	92.0	
Labor hold		Swing	+1.1	

=== Caulfield ===
1976 Victorian state election: Caulfield
Party	Candidate	Votes	%	±%
Liberal	Charles Francis	15,851	60.8	+6.3
Labor	Gilbert Wright	8,930	34.2	−4.0
Democratic Labor	Mary Lane	1,300	5.0	−1.3
Total formal votes		26,081	96.9	
Informal votes		821	3.1	
Turnout		26,902	89.1	
Two-party-preferred result
Liberal	Charles Francis	17,021	65.3	+4.7
Labor	Gilbert Wright	9,060	34.7	−4.7
Liberal hold		Swing	+4.7	

=== Coburg ===
1976 Victorian state election: Coburg
Party	Candidate	Votes	%	±%
Labor	Peter Gavin	11,324	43.3	−1.2
Independent	Jack Mutton	7,452	28.5	+8.6
Liberal	Nicholas Kosenko	6,044	23.1	−2.0
Democratic Labor	Helen Hart	1,336	5.1	−5.4
Total formal votes		26,156	96.6	
Informal votes		931	3.4	
Turnout		27,087	93.6	
Two-candidate-preferred result
Independent	Jack Mutton	14,478	55.3	+2.4
Labor	Peter Gavin	11,678	44.7	−2.4
Independent hold		Swing	+2.4	

=== Dandenong ===
1976 Victorian state election: Dandenong
Party	Candidate	Votes	%	±%
Labor	Alan Lind	15,568	55.2	+3.6
Liberal	James Grayling	12,637	44.8	+4.1
Total formal votes		28,205	96.8	
Informal votes		920	3.2	
Turnout		29,125	92.9	
Labor hold		Swing	+2.8	

=== Doncaster ===
1976 Victorian state election: Doncaster
Party	Candidate	Votes	%	±%
Liberal	Morris Williams	14,014	53.2	−1.6
Labor	Francis Smith	7,078	26.9	−5.3
Independent	Edward Ajani	4,331	16.4	+16.4
Democratic Labor	Margaret Coogan	915	3.5	−3.2
Total formal votes		26,338	96.8	
Informal votes		920	3.2	
Turnout		26,740	94.0	
Two-party-preferred result
Liberal	Morris Williams	17,360	65.9	+2.3
Labor	Francis Smith	8,978	34.1	−2.3
Liberal hold		Swing	+2.3	

=== Dromana ===
1976 Victorian state election: Dromana
Party	Candidate	Votes	%	±%
Liberal	Roberts Dunstan	14,895	59.6	+3.9
Labor	Geoffrey Eastwood	9,173	36.7	−0.2
Democratic Labor	John Cass	939	3.8	−1.2
Total formal votes		25,007	98.4	
Informal votes		415	1.6	
Turnout		25,422	90.7	
Two-party-preferred result
Liberal	Roberts Dunstan	15,740	62.9	+1.5
Labor	Geoffrey Eastwood	9,267	37.1	−1.5
Liberal hold		Swing	+1.5	

=== Essendon ===
1976 Victorian state election: Essendon
Party	Candidate	Votes	%	±%
Liberal	Kenneth Wheeler	13,197	50.05	+8.1
Labor	Barry Rowe	13,173	49.95	+5.7
Total formal votes		26,370	97.2	
Informal votes		748	2.8	
Turnout		27,118	93.9	
Liberal hold		Swing	−2.8	

=== Evelyn ===
1976 Victorian state election: Evelyn
Party	Candidate	Votes	%	±%
Liberal	Jim Plowman	13,081	52.0	+1.3
Labor	Warren Thomas	9,934	39.5	−2.1
Democratic Labor	Francis Feltham	1,115	4.4	−0.4
National	Errol Simon	1,103	4.0	+3.7
Total formal votes		25,143	98.0	
Informal votes		519	2.0	
Turnout		25,662	91.6	
Two-party-preferred result
Liberal	Jim Plowman	14,997	59.6	+3.1
Labor	Warren Thomas	10,146	40.4	−3.1
Liberal hold		Swing	+3.1	

=== Footscray ===
1976 Victorian state election: Footscray
Party	Candidate	Votes	%	±%
Labor	Robert Fordham	18,528	71.6	+10.4
Liberal	James Kapoudaglis	7,368	28.4	+1.8
Total formal votes		25,896	95.5	
Informal votes		1,216	4.5	
Turnout		27,112	92.5	
Labor hold		Swing	+8.9	

=== Forest Hill ===
1976 Victorian state election: Forest Hill
Party	Candidate	Votes	%	±%
Liberal	John Richardson	16,065	58.3	+4.1
Labor	Neville Gay	9,993	36.4	+2.0
Democratic Labor	Francis Poole	1,388	5.1	−1.4
Total formal votes		27,446	98.3	
Informal votes		470	1.7	
Turnout		27,916	93.8	
Two-party-preferred result
Liberal	John Richardson	17,314	63.1	+0.9
Labor	Neville Gay	10,132	36.9	−0.9
Liberal hold		Swing	+0.9	

=== Frankston ===
1976 Victorian state election: Frankston
Party	Candidate	Votes	%	±%
Liberal	Graeme Weideman	16,247	59.3	+7.2
Labor	Alison Ogden	10,005	36.5	−0.7
Democratic Labor	John Glynn	1,154	4.2	−0.9
Total formal votes		27,406	98.4	
Informal votes		446	1.6	
Turnout		27,852	92.2	
Two-party-preferred result
Liberal	Graeme Weideman	17,170	62.7	+3.3
Labor	Alison Ogden	10,236	37.3	−3.3
Liberal hold		Swing	+3.3	

=== Geelong East ===
1976 Victorian state election: Geelong East
Party	Candidate	Votes	%	±%
Liberal	Phil Gude	11,637	51.5	+6.6
Labor	Dennis O'Brien	10,971	48.5	+3.1
Total formal votes		22,608	97.0	
Informal votes		691	3.0	
Turnout		23,299	93.8	
Liberal hold		Swing	−1.4	

=== Geelong North ===
1976 Victorian state election: Geelong North
Party	Candidate	Votes	%	±%
Labor	Neil Trezise	14,194	62.6	+3.5
Liberal	Stanley Yates	8,464	37.4	+5.2
Total formal votes		22,658	96.8	
Informal votes		759	3.2	
Turnout		23,417	93.2	
Labor hold		Swing	+2.5	

=== Geelong West ===
1976 Victorian state election: Geelong West
Party	Candidate	Votes	%	±%
Liberal	Hayden Birrell	13,111	55.2	+10.9
Labor	Kevin Kirby	10,658	44.8	−0.6
Total formal votes		23,769	97.7	
Informal votes		551	2.3	
Turnout		24,320	95.1	
Liberal hold		Swing	+2.5	

=== Gippsland East ===
1976 Victorian state election: Gippsland East
Party	Candidate	Votes	%	±%
National	Bruce Evans	10,484	45.9	+7.1
Independent	Geoffrey Cox	6,419	28.1	+28.1
Liberal	Geoffrey Ramsden	4,899	21.4	−2.9
Democratic Labor	Robert McMahon	1,038	4.5	−1.5
Total formal votes		22,840	97.8	
Informal votes		505	2.2	
Turnout		23,345	92.4	
Two-candidate-preferred result
National	Bruce Evans	16,146	70.7	+3.3
Independent	Geoffrey Cox	6,694	29.3	+29.3
National hold		Swing	N/A	

=== Gippsland South ===
1976 Victorian state election: Gippsland South
Party	Candidate	Votes	%	±%
National	Neil McInnes	10,611	45.5	+15.1
Liberal	David Kallady	6,797	29.1	−10.0
Labor	Russel Wilson	4,851	20.8	−2.6
Democratic Labor	Leonard Carroll	1,083	4.6	−2.5
Total formal votes		23,342	98.1	
Informal votes		439	1.9	
Turnout		23,781	93.6	
Two-candidate-preferred result
National	Neil McInnes	11,964	51.3	−1.0
Liberal	David Kallady	11,378	48.7	+1.0
National hold		Swing	−1.0	

=== Gisborne ===
1976 Victorian state election: Gisborne
Party	Candidate	Votes	%	±%
Liberal	Athol Guy	13,159	52.5	+2.2
Labor	George Beardsley	8,669	34.6	−1.7
National	Robert Cooper	1,738	6.9	+3.0
Democratic Labor	Paul McManus	1,484	5.9	−3.4
Total formal votes		25,050	98.3	
Informal votes		439	1.7	
Turnout		25,489	94.1	
Two-party-preferred result
Liberal	Athol Guy	16,083	64.2	+2.3
Labor	George Beardsley	8,967	35.8	−2.3
Liberal hold		Swing	+2.3	

=== Glenhuntly ===
1976 Victorian state election: Glenhuntly
Party	Candidate	Votes	%	±%
Liberal	Joe Rafferty	13,183	51.9	+2.4
Labor	Gerard Vaughan	10,487	41.3	+1.9
Democratic Labor	Terence Farrell	1,751	6.9	−0.8
Total formal votes		25,421	97.5	
Informal votes		658	2.5	
Turnout		26,079	91.8	
Two-party-preferred result
Liberal	Joe Rafferty	14,759	58.1	+0.2
Labor	Gerard Vaughan	10,662	41.9	−0.2
Liberal hold		Swing	+0.2	

=== Glenroy ===
1976 Victorian state election: Glenroy
Party	Candidate	Votes	%	±%
Labor	Jack Culpin	14,804	58.9	+2.9
Liberal	Francis Mott	10,319	41.1	+10.4
Total formal votes		25,123	96.3	
Informal votes		970	3.7	
Turnout		26,093	93.9	
Labor hold		Swing	0.0	

=== Greensborough ===
1976 Victorian state election: Greensborough
Party	Candidate	Votes	%	±%
Liberal	Monte Vale	14,648	52.7	+10.4
Labor	Brian McKinlay	13,120	47.3	+2.8
Total formal votes		27,768	98.1	
Informal votes		531	1.9	
Turnout		28,299	93.1	
Liberal hold		Swing	+1.9	

=== Hawthorn ===
1976 Victorian state election: Hawthorn
Party	Candidate	Votes	%	±%
Liberal	Walter Jona	13,580	54.3	+1.0
Labor	Evan Walker	9,487	38.0	+2.9
Democratic Labor	Daniel Condon	1,556	6.2	−1.2
Independent	Jennifer Relf	361	1.4	+1.4
Total formal votes		24,984	98.0	
Informal votes		506	2.0	
Turnout		25,490	90.6	
Two-party-preferred result
Liberal	Walter Jona	15,161	60.7	−1.1
Labor	Evan Walker	9,823	39.3	+1.1
Liberal hold		Swing	−1.1	

=== Heatherton ===
1976 Victorian state election: Heatherton
Party	Candidate	Votes	%	±%
Liberal	Llew Reese	14,542	55.4	+5.7
Labor	Peter Spyker	11,690	44.6	+1.4
Total formal votes		26,232	96.9	
Informal votes		851	3.1	
Turnout		27,083	93.4	
Liberal hold		Swing	−0.3	

=== Ivanhoe ===
1976 Victorian state election: Ivanhoe
Party	Candidate	Votes	%	±%
Liberal	Bruce Skeggs	15,153	54.0	+7.2
Labor	John Lelleton	10,691	38.1	−0.5
Democratic Labor	Margaret Rush	2,196	7.8	−0.3
Total formal votes		28,040	98.1	
Informal votes		544	1.9	
Turnout		28,584	92.6	
Two-party-preferred result
Liberal	Bruce Skeggs	17,129	61.1	+6.2
Labor	John Lelleton	10,911	38.9	−6.2
Liberal hold		Swing	−6.2	

=== Keilor ===
1976 Victorian state election: Keilor
Party	Candidate	Votes	%	±%
Labor	Jack Ginifer	14,914	58.2	+1.3
Liberal	Vaclav Ubl	10,112	39.4	+6.5
Independent	Spyros Kokkinos	604	2.4	+2.4
Total formal votes		25,630	95.3	
Informal votes		1,273	4.7	
Turnout		26,903	92.9	
Two-party-preferred result
Labor	Jack Ginifer	15,418	60.2	+2.1
Liberal	Vaclav Ubl	10,212	39.8	−2.1
Labor hold		Swing	+2.1	

=== Kew ===
1976 Victorian state election: Kew
Party	Candidate	Votes	%	±%
Liberal	Rupert Hamer	15,379	57.7	−6.0
Labor	Gary Jungwirth	6,997	26.2	−1.7
Independent	Charles Barrington	1,713	6.4	+6.4
Independent	Margaret Tighe	1,455	5.5	+5.5
Democratic Labor	Francis Duffy	1,121	4.2	−4.1
Total formal votes		26,665	98.1	
Informal votes		516	1.9	
Turnout		27,181	91.6	
Two-party-preferred result
Liberal	Rupert Hamer	18,670	70.0	−1.1
Labor	Gary Jungwirth	7,995	30.0	+1.1
Liberal hold		Swing	−1.1	

=== Knox ===
1976 Victorian state election: Knox
Party	Candidate	Votes	%	±%
Labor	Steve Crabb	13,573	51.3	+5.7
Liberal	Bruce Fasham	12,874	48.7	+5.4
Total formal votes		26,447	97.4	
Informal votes		717	2.6	
Turnout		27,164	92.5	
Labor gain from Liberal		Swing	+2.1	

=== Lowan ===
1976 Victorian state election: Lowan
Party	Candidate	Votes	%	±%
Liberal	Jim McCabe	10,052	43.5	−0.1
National	Howard Ellis	6,174	26.7	+6.3
Labor	Brian Brooke	4,923	21.3	−6.8
Independent	Francis Petering	1,164	5.0	+5.0
Democratic Labor	Kevin Dunn	788	3.4	−1.5
Total formal votes		23,101	98.1	
Informal votes		451	1.9	
Turnout		23,552	95.3	
Two-candidate-preferred result
Liberal	Jim McCabe	14,249	61.7	−5.8
National	Howard Ellis	8,852	38.3	+38.3
Liberal hold		Swing	N/A	

=== Malvern ===
1976 Victorian state election: Malvern
Party	Candidate	Votes	%	±%
Liberal	Lindsay Thompson	17,225	65.7	+6.6
Labor	Evelyn Watson	7,496	28.6	−3.8
Democratic Labor	John Cotter	1,503	5.7	−0.7
Total formal votes		26,224	98.0	
Informal votes		530	2.0	
Turnout		26,754	90.5	
Two-party-preferred result
Liberal	Lindsay Thompson	18,578	70.8	+5.0
Labor	Evelyn Watson	7,646	29.2	−5.0
Liberal hold		Swing	+5.0	

=== Melbourne ===
1976 Victorian state election: Melbourne
Party	Candidate	Votes	%	±%
Labor	Barry Jones	15,104	62.4	+4.5
Liberal	Bruce Atkinson	8,415	34.7	+6.1
Independent	Lou-Anne Barker	696	2.9	+2.9
Total formal votes		24,215	95.9	
Informal votes		1,023	4.1	
Turnout		25,238	86.3	
Two-party-preferred result
Labor	Barry Jones	15,685	64.8	+3.0
Liberal	Bruce Atkinson	8,530	35.2	−3.0
Labor hold		Swing	+3.0	

=== Mentone ===
1976 Victorian state election: Mentone
Party	Candidate	Votes	%	±%
Liberal	Bill Templeton	14,777	55.9	+6.6
Labor	Barry Hirt	10,021	37.9	−3.6
Democratic Labor	Desmond Burke	1,650	6.2	−0.7
Total formal votes		26,448	98.2	
Informal votes		490	1.8	
Turnout		26,938	92.4	
Two-party-preferred result
Liberal	Bill Templeton	16,097	60.9	+4.8
Labor	Barry Hirt	10,351	39.1	−4.8
Liberal hold		Swing	+4.8	

=== Midlands ===
1976 Victorian state election: Midlands
Party	Candidate	Votes	%	±%
Liberal	Bill Ebery	9,294	40.2	−0.6
Labor	Donal Harvey	8,548	37.0	−7.7
National	Clarence Rodda	4,271	18.5	+10.3
Democratic Labor	Audrey Drechsler	1,010	4.4	−1.8
Total formal votes		23,123	98.5	
Informal votes		346	1.5	
Turnout		23,469	94.8	
Two-party-preferred result
Liberal	Bill Ebery	14,031	60.7	+7.5
Labor	Donal Harvey	9,092	39.3	−7.5
Liberal hold		Swing	+7.5	

=== Mildura ===
1976 Victorian state election: Mildura
Party	Candidate	Votes	%	±%
National	Milton Whiting	11,521	51.8	−7.2
Labor	Noel Treharne	5,197	23.4	−1.2
Liberal	Lloyd Beasy	4,773	21.5	+10.7
Democratic Labor	Stanley Croughan	752	3.4	−1.9
Total formal votes		22,243	97.9	
Informal votes		472	2.1	
Turnout		22,715	92.9	
Two-party-preferred result
National	Milton Whiting	16,494	74.2	+0.3
Labor	Noel Treharne	5,749	25.8	−0.3
National hold		Swing	+0.3	

=== Mitcham ===
1976 Victorian state election: Mitcham
Party	Candidate	Votes	%	±%
Liberal	George Cox	14,294	55.5	+9.7
Labor	Gordon Henderson	11,444	44.5	+2.4
Total formal votes		25,738	97.4	
Informal votes		693	2.6	
Turnout		26,431	93.6	
Liberal hold		Swing	+1.7	

=== Monbulk ===
1976 Victorian state election: Monbulk
Party	Candidate	Votes	%	±%
Liberal	Bill Borthwick	13,978	56.6	+5.0
Labor	Stuart Morris	10,704	43.4	+2.7
Total formal votes		24,682	97.8	
Informal votes		561	2.2	
Turnout		25,243	91.5	
Liberal hold		Swing	+0.1	

=== Morwell ===
1976 Victorian state election: Morwell
Party	Candidate	Votes	%	±%
Labor	Derek Amos	14,832	62.2	+3.7
Liberal	Frank Hall	5,551	23.3	−1.6
National	James Davis	2,444	10.3	+0.6
Democratic Labor	John Mann	1,022	4.3	−2.6
Total formal votes		23,849	98.3	
Informal votes		409	1.7	
Turnout		24,258	93.8	
Two-party-preferred result
Labor	Derek Amos	15,178	63.6	+2.7
Liberal	Frank Hall	8,671	36.4	−2.7
Labor hold		Swing	+2.7	

=== Murray Valley ===
1976 Victorian state election: Murray Valley
Party	Candidate	Votes	%	±%
National	Ken Jasper	10,812	46.4	+2.0
Labor	Abigail Donlon	5,934	25.5	−3.9
Liberal	Brian Lumsden	4,942	21.2	+4.0
Democratic Labor	Patrick Payne	1,590	6.8	−2.1
Total formal votes		23,278	97.6	
Informal votes		561	2.4	
Turnout		23,839	94.9	
Two-party-preferred result
National	Ken Jasper	16,776	72.1	+3.6
Labor	Abigail Donlon	6,502	27.9	−3.6
National hold		Swing	+3.6	

=== Narracan ===
1976 Victorian state election: Narracan
Party	Candidate	Votes	%	±%
Labor	Pat Bartholomeusz	8,897	37.6	−4.3
Liberal	Jim Balfour	8,443	35.6	−3.1
National	Arthur Hewson	5,331	22.5	+9.7
Democratic Labor	Brian Handley	1,020	4.3	−2.4
Total formal votes		23,691	98.6	
Informal votes		337	1.4	
Turnout		24,028	94.1	
Two-party-preferred result
Liberal	Jim Balfour	14,265	60.2	+3.8
Labor	Pat Bartholomeusz	9,426	39.8	−3.8
Liberal hold		Swing	+3.8	

=== Niddrie ===
1976 Victorian state election: Niddrie
Party	Candidate	Votes	%	±%
Labor	Jack Simpson	12,571	48.9	−4.0
Liberal	Peter Kirchner	11,067	43.0	+6.4
Independent	Lancelot Hutchinson	2,078	8.1	+8.1
Total formal votes		25,716	96.7	
Informal votes		876	3.3	
Turnout		26,592	95.8	
Two-party-preferred result
Labor	Jack Simpson	13,378	52.0	−2.1
Liberal	Peter Kirchner	12,338	48.0	+2.1
Labor hold		Swing	−2.1	

=== Noble Park ===
1976 Victorian state election: Noble Park
Party	Candidate	Votes	%	±%
Liberal	Peter Collins	15,462	56.1	+9.0
Labor	Tony Van Vliet	12,086	43.9	−2.5
Total formal votes		28,404	97.0	
Informal votes		856	3.0	
Turnout		28,404	93.5	
Liberal hold		Swing	+3.2	

=== Northcote ===
1976 Victorian state election: Northcote
Party	Candidate	Votes	%	±%
Labor	Frank Wilkes	16,809	64.2	+5.8
Liberal	Gillford Brown	9,388	35.8	+4.6
Total formal votes		26,197	96.3	
Informal votes		1,002	3.7	
Turnout		27,199	90.7	
Labor hold		Swing	+4.3	

=== Oakleigh ===
1976 Victorian state election: Oakleigh
Party	Candidate	Votes	%	±%
Liberal	Alan Scanlan	12,411	46.4	−2.6
Labor	Sam Papasavas	10,450	39.1	−2.7
Independent	Leslie Kausman	2,766	10.4	+10.4
Australia	Trevor Cooke	1,110	4.2	+2.4
Total formal votes		26,737	97.6	
Informal votes		658	2.4	
Turnout		27,395	93.4	
Two-party-preferred result
Liberal	Alan Scanlan	13,706	51.3	−5.2
Labor	Sam Papasavas	13,031	48.7	+5.2
Liberal hold		Swing	−5.2	

=== Polwarth ===
1976 Victorian state election: Polwarth
Party	Candidate	Votes	%	±%
Liberal	Cec Burgin	12,976	55.0	+0.6
Labor	Ronald Wheaton	5,018	21.3	−0.9
National	Frederick Sadler	4,455	18.9	+4.1
Democratic Labor	Thomas Fleming	1,132	4.8	−3.8
Total formal votes		23,581	98.4	
Informal votes		383	1.6	
Turnout		23,964	95.8	
Two-party-preferred result
Liberal	Cec Burgin	18,059	76.6	+2.3
Labor	Ronald Wheaton	5,522	23.4	−2.3
Liberal hold		Swing	+2.3	

=== Portland ===
1976 Victorian state election: Portland
Party	Candidate	Votes	%	±%
Liberal	Don McKellar	9,992	41.6	+3.5
Labor	Bill Lewis	7,839	32.7	−10.2
National	Clive Mitchell	5,246	21.8	+8.2
Democratic Labor	Patrick Healy	932	3.9	−1.5
Total formal votes		24,009	98.8	
Informal votes		290	1.2	
Turnout		24,299	95.5	
Two-party-preferred result
Liberal	Don McKellar	15,530	64.7	+11.1
Labor	Bill Lewis	8,479	35.3	−11.1
Liberal hold		Swing	+11.1	

=== Prahran ===
1976 Victorian state election: Prahran
Party	Candidate	Votes	%	±%
Liberal	Sam Loxton	12,414	51.5	+0.3
Labor	Morris Milder	9,760	40.5	−2.2
Independent	Michael Salvaris	1,086	4.5	+4.5
Workers	Paul Krutulis	858	3.6	+3.6
Total formal votes		24,118	97.0	
Informal votes		753	3.0	
Turnout		24,871	84.3	
Two-party-preferred result
Liberal	Sam Loxton	13,419	55.7	−0.8
Labor	Morris Milder	10,699	44.3	+0.8
Liberal hold		Swing	−0.8	

=== Preston ===
1976 Victorian state election: Preston
Party	Candidate	Votes	%	±%
Labor	Carl Kirkwood	16,869	65.8	+10.8
Liberal	John Miles	8,781	34.2	+2.4
Total formal votes		25,650	96.2	
Informal votes		1,009	3.8	
Turnout		26,659	91.9	
Labor hold		Swing	+7.1	

=== Reservoir ===
1976 Victorian state election: Reservoir
Party	Candidate	Votes	%	±%
Labor	Jim Simmonds	16,639	62.8	+8.6
Liberal	Tony De Domenico	8,904	33.6	+3.4
Independent	Matthew Curie	972	3.7	+3.7
Total formal votes		26,515	96.5	
Informal votes		949	3.5	
Turnout		27,464	93.0	
Two-party-preferred result
Labor	Jim Simmonds	17,007	64.1	+5.5
Liberal	Tony De Domenico	9,508	35.9	−5.5
Labor hold		Swing	+5.5	

=== Richmond ===
1976 Victorian state election: Richmond
Party	Candidate	Votes	%	±%
Labor	Clyde Holding	18,340	70.9	+6.3
Liberal	John Rush	6,804	26.3	+3.6
Independent	Andrew Jamieson	732	2.8	+2.8
Total formal votes		25,876	96.1	
Informal votes		1,050	3.9	
Turnout		26,926	87.5	
Two-party-preferred result
Labor	Clyde Holding	18,963	73.3	+6.8
Liberal	John Rush	6,913	26.7	−6.8
Labor hold		Swing	+6.8	

=== Ringwood ===
1976 Victorian state election: Ringwood
Party	Candidate	Votes	%	±%
Liberal	Peter McArthur	15,288	59.0	+9.7
Labor	Robert Wallace	10,637	41.0	+1.4
Total formal votes		25,925	97.5	
Informal votes		673	2.5	
Turnout		26,598	93.2	
Liberal hold		Swing	+2.4	

=== Ripon ===
1976 Victorian state election: Ripon
Party	Candidate	Votes	%	±%
Labor	Alexander Pope	9,277	38.4	−9.0
Liberal	Tom Austin	9,216	38.2	+4.8
National	Rob Borbidge	4,941	20.5	+6.5
Democratic Labor	Francis O'Brien	713	2.9	−2.3
Total formal votes		24,147	98.5	
Informal votes		366	1.5	
Turnout		24,513	95.4	
Two-party-preferred result
Liberal	Tom Austin	14,473	59.9	+10.3
Labor	Alexander Pope	9,674	40.1	−10.3
Liberal gain from Labor		Swing	+10.3	

=== Rodney ===
1976 Victorian state election: Rodney
Party	Candidate	Votes	%	±%
National	Eddie Hann	15,196	64.2	+11.7
Liberal	Graham Arthur	4,009	16.9	+0.7
Labor	Michael Smith	3,556	15.0	−6.5
Democratic Labor	David Kane	924	3.9	−6.0
Total formal votes		23,685	98.4	
Informal votes		372	1.6	
Turnout		24,057	95.1	
Two-party-preferred result
National	Eddie Hann	19,680	83.1	+6.9
Labor	Michael Smith	4,005	16.9	−6.9
National hold		Swing	+6.9	

=== Sandringham ===
1976 Victorian state election: Sandringham
Party	Candidate	Votes	%	±%
Liberal	Max Crellin	14,220	53.7	−0.5
Labor	Vivienne Brophy	11,177	42.2	+2.1
Democratic Labor	Salvatore Pinzone	1,069	4.0	−1.7
Total formal votes		26,466	98.3	
Informal votes		461	1.7	
Turnout		26,927	92.4	
Two-party-preferred result
Liberal	Max Crellin	15,182	57.4	−1.9
Labor	Vivienne Brophy	11,284	42.6	+1.9
Liberal hold		Swing	−1.9	

=== Shepparton ===
1976 Victorian state election: Shepparton
Party	Candidate	Votes	%	±%
National	Peter Ross-Edwards	12,753	54.1	+9.6
Liberal	Bill Hunter	5,099	21.6	−1.8
Labor	Stephen Fletcher	4,570	19.4	−3.8
Democratic Labor	Martha Bennetts	1,154	4.9	−4.0
Total formal votes		23,576	97.9	
Informal votes		497	2.1	
Turnout		24,073	95.3	
Two-party-preferred result
National	Peter Ross-Edwards	18,308	77.7	+5.6
Labor	Stephen Fletcher	5,268	22.3	−5.6
National hold		Swing	+5.6	

=== South Barwon ===
1976 Victorian state election: South Barwon
Party	Candidate	Votes	%	±%
Liberal	Aurel Smith	14,093	58.6	+4.2
Labor	Raymond Hughan	8,786	36.6	−0.2
Democratic Labor	James Jordan	1,159	4.8	−1.7
Total formal votes		24,038	98.2	
Informal votes		434	1.8	
Turnout		24,472	94.5	
Two-party-preferred result
Liberal	Aurel Smith	15,136	63.0	+0.9
Labor	Raymond Hughan	8,902	37.0	−0.9
Liberal hold		Swing	+0.9	

=== Springvale ===
1976 Victorian state election: Springvale
Party	Candidate	Votes	%	±%
Liberal	Norman Billing	13,737	54.4	+7.1
Labor	Kevin King	11,498	45.6	+1.1
Total formal votes		25,235	96.5	
Informal votes		926	3.5	
Turnout		26,161	93.3	
Liberal hold		Swing	+0.5	

=== St Kilda ===
1976 Victorian state election: St Kilda
Party	Candidate	Votes	%	±%
Liberal	Brian Dixon	13,430	52.6	+6.2
Labor	David Hardy	9,969	39.1	−5.0
Independent	Peter Lake	1,042	4.1	+4.1
Independent	Ronald Petersen	853	3.3	+3.3
Independent	Frederick Gray	217	0.9	+0.9
Total formal votes		25,511	96.6	
Informal votes		908	3.4	
Turnout		26,419	86.2	
Two-party-preferred result
Liberal	Brian Dixon	14,304	56.1	+2.7
Labor	David Hardy	11,207	43.9	−2.7
Liberal hold		Swing	+2.7	

=== Sunshine ===
1976 Victorian state election: Sunshine
Party	Candidate	Votes	%	±%
Labor	Bill Fogarty	16,715	64.2	−0.2
Liberal	David More	6,563	25.2	+0.6
Independent	Charles Skidmore	2,771	10.6	+10.6
Total formal votes		26,049	95.3	
Informal votes		1,282	4.7	
Turnout		27,331	91.9	
Two-party-preferred result
Labor	Bill Fogarty	18,651	71.6	+5.9
Liberal	David More	7,398	28.4	−5.9
Labor hold		Swing	+5.9	

=== Swan Hill ===
1976 Victorian state election: Swan Hill
Party	Candidate	Votes	%	±%
Liberal	Alan Wood	11,318	48.3	+17.3
National	James Mitchell	8,258	35.3	−3.5
Labor	Graeme Lechte	3,352	14.3	−8.8
Democratic Labor	Daniel Mason	494	2.1	−5.0
Total formal votes		23,422	98.6	
Informal votes		331	1.4	
Turnout		23,753	94.7	
Two-candidate-preferred result
Liberal	Alan Wood	14,097	60.2	+9.2
National	James Mitchell	9,325	39.8	−9.2
Liberal hold		Swing	+9.2	

=== Syndal ===
1976 Victorian state election: Syndal
Party	Candidate	Votes	%	±%
Liberal	Geoff Coleman	14,898	56.1	+7.5
Labor	John Perryman	11,638	43.9	+4.0
Total formal votes		26,536	97.3	
Informal votes		748	2.7	
Turnout		27,284	93.5	
Liberal hold		Swing	−1.0	

=== Wantirna ===
1976 Victorian state election: Wantirna
Party	Candidate	Votes	%	±%
Liberal	Geoff Hayes	16,600	60.9	+7.3
Labor	Christopher Miller	9,170	33.6	−0.8
Democratic Labor	Clement Elliot	1,491	5.5	+0.5
Total formal votes		27,261	98.3	
Informal votes		475	1.7	
Turnout		27,736	93.0	
Two-party-preferred result
Liberal	Geoff Hayes	17,942	65.8	+4.1
Labor	Christopher Miller	9,319	34.2	−4.1
Liberal hold		Swing	+4.1	

=== Warrandyte ===
1976 Victorian state election: Warrandyte
Party	Candidate	Votes	%	±%
Liberal	Norman Lacy	16,235	60.6	+8.4
Labor	Frederick Davis	10,553	39.4	+2.4
Total formal votes		26,788	97.9	
Informal votes		583	2.1	
Turnout		27,371	93.2	
Liberal hold		Swing	+1.6	

=== Warrnambool ===
1976 Victorian state election: Warrnambool
Party	Candidate	Votes	%	±%
Liberal	Ian Smith	11,036	46.8	+6.5
Labor	Vernon Delaney	7,365	31.2	−1.6
National	Murray Lane	3,556	15.1	−0.1
Democratic Labor	Peter Burke	1,643	7.0	−4.8
Total formal votes		23,600	98.7	
Informal votes		308	1.3	
Turnout		23,908	95.2	
Two-party-preferred result
Liberal	Ian Smith	15,387	65.2	+2.1
Labor	Vernon Delaney	8,213	34.8	−2.1
Liberal hold		Swing	+2.1	

=== Werribee ===
1976 Victorian state election: Werribee
Party	Candidate	Votes	%	±%
Labor	Anthony Robinson	12,422	48.8	0.0
Liberal	Neville Hudson	11,959	47.0	+7.2
Workers	Walter Lockhart	1,086	4.3	+4.3
Total formal votes		25,467	97.5	
Informal votes		647	2.5	
Turnout		26,114	91.7	
Two-party-preferred result
Liberal	Neville Hudson	12,745	50.05	+0.2
Labor	Anthony Robinson	12,722	49.95	−0.2
Liberal gain from Labor		Swing	+0.2	

=== Westernport ===
1976 Victorian state election: Westernport
Party	Candidate	Votes	%	±%
Liberal	Doug Jennings	11,237	46.2	−1.6
Labor	John Daley	7,812	32.1	−0.3
National	Michael Woods	4,429	18.2	+5.0
Democratic Labor	Kevin Leydon	866	3.6	−3.0
Total formal votes		24,344	98.1	
Informal votes		462	1.9	
Turnout		24,806	93.3	
Two-party-preferred result
Liberal	Doug Jennings	16,146	66.3	+1.6
Labor	John Daley	8,198	33.7	−1.6
Liberal hold		Swing	+1.6	

=== Williamstown ===
1976 Victorian state election: Williamstown
Party	Candidate	Votes	%	±%
Labor	Gordon Stirling	16,221	63.0	+2.7
Liberal	Wallace Feeney	9,514	37.0	+4.8
Total formal votes		25,735	94.1	
Informal votes		1,609	5.9	
Turnout		27,344	92.9	
Labor hold		Swing	+1.9	

== See also ==
- 1976 Victorian state election
- Members of the Victorian Legislative Assembly, 1976–1979
