= Members of the Victorian Legislative Assembly, 1979–1982 =

- ←1976–1979 1982–1985→

This is a list of members of the Victorian Legislative Assembly from 1979 to 1982, as elected at the 1979 state election:

Name	Party	Electorate	Term in office
Derek Amos ^{[2]}	Labor	Morwell	1970–1981
Hon Tom Austin	Liberal	Ripon	1972–1992
Hon Jim Balfour	Liberal	Narracan	1955–1982
Hayden Birrell	Liberal	Geelong West	1961–1982
Bill Borthwick	Liberal	Monbulk	1960–1982
Alan Brown	Liberal	Westernport	1979–1996
Cec Burgin	Liberal	Polwarth	1970–1985
John Cain	Labor	Bundoora	1976–1992
Valerie Callister ^{[2]}	Labor	Morwell	1981–1984, 1984–1988
Ian Cathie	Labor	Carrum	1976–1988
Joan Chambers	Liberal	Ballarat South	1979–1982
Ken Coghill	Labor	Werribee	1979–1996
Geoff Coleman	Liberal	Syndal	1976–1982, 1985–1999
Peter Collins	Liberal	Noble Park	1976–1982
George Cox	Liberal	Mitcham	1976–1982
Steve Crabb	Labor	Knox	1976–1992
Max Crellin	Liberal	Sandringham	1970–1982
Jack Culpin	Labor	Glenroy	1976–1988
Hon Brian Dixon	Liberal	St Kilda	1964–1982
Hon Roberts Dunstan	Liberal	Dromana	1956–1982
Bill Ebery	Liberal	Midlands	1973–1985
Tom Edmunds	Labor	Ascot Vale	1967–1988
Graham Ernst	Labor	Geelong East	1979–1992
Bruce Evans	National	Gippsland East	1961–1992
Tom Evans	Liberal	Ballarat North	1960–1988
Bill Fogarty	Labor	Sunshine	1973–1988
Robert Fordham	Labor	Footscray	1970–1992
Peter Gavin	Labor	Coburg	1979–1992
Jack Ginifer	Labor	Keilor	1966–1982
Hon Rupert Hamer ^{[3]}	Liberal	Kew	1971–1981
Eddie Hann	National	Rodney	1973–1989
Hon Geoff Hayes	Liberal	Wantirna	1967–1982
Gordon Hockley	Labor	Bentleigh	1979–1988
Ken Jasper	National	Murray Valley	1976–2010
Rob Jolly	Labor	Dandenong	1979–1992
Hon Walter Jona	Liberal	Hawthorn	1964–1985
Hon Jeff Kennett	Liberal	Burwood	1976–1999
Kevin King	Labor	Springvale	1979–1983
Carl Kirkwood	Labor	Preston	1970–1988
Hon Norman Lacy	Liberal	Warrandyte	1973–1982
Hon Lou Lieberman	Liberal	Benambra	1976–1992
Donald Mackinnon	Liberal	Box Hill	1976–1982
Hon Rob Maclellan	Liberal	Berwick	1970–2002
Race Mathews	Labor	Oakleigh	1979–1992
Bill McGrath	National	Lowan	1979–1999
Don McKellar	Liberal	Portland	1967–1970, 1973–1985
Peter McArthur	Liberal	Ringwood	1976–1982
Keith McCance	Liberal	Bennettswood	1979–1982
Daryl McClure	Liberal	Bendigo	1973–1982
Neil McInnes	National/Liberal ^{[1]}	Gippsland South	1973–1982
Bob Miller	Labor	Prahran	1979–1985
Jeannette Patrick	Liberal	Brighton	1976–1985
Hon Jim Plowman	Liberal	Evelyn	1973–1982, 1985–1999
Hon Jim Ramsay	Liberal	Balwyn	1973–1988
Keith Remington	Labor	Melbourne	1977–1988
Tom Reynolds	Liberal	Gisborne	1979–1999
John Richardson	Liberal	Forest Hill	1976–2002
Tom Roper	Labor	Brunswick	1973–1994
Peter Ross-Edwards	National	Shepparton	1967–1991
Barry Rowe	Labor	Essendon	1979–1992
Prue Sibree ^{[3]}	Liberal	Kew	1981–1988
Theo Sidiropoulos	Labor	Richmond	1977–1988
Jim Simmonds	Labor	Reservoir	1969–1992
Jack Simpson	Labor	Niddrie	1976–1988
Bruce Skeggs	Liberal	Ivanhoe	1973–1982
Aurel Smith	Liberal	South Barwon	1967–1982
Hon Ian Smith	Liberal	Warrnambool	1967–1983, 1985–1999
Peter Spyker	Labor	Heatherton	1979–1992
Gordon Stirling	Labor	Williamstown	1973–1988
Ted Tanner	Liberal	Caulfield	1979–1996
Bill Templeton	Liberal	Mentone	1967–1985
Hon Lindsay Thompson	Liberal	Malvern	1970–1982
Pauline Toner	Labor	Greensborough	1977–1989
Neil Trezise	Labor	Geelong North	1964–1992
Tom Trewin	National	Benalla	1961–1982
Gerard Vaughan	Labor	Glenhuntly	1979–1996
Bunna Walsh	Labor	Albert Park	1979–1992
Graeme Weideman	Liberal	Frankston	1976–1982, 1985–1996
Milton Whiting	National	Mildura	1962–1988
Frank Wilkes	Labor	Northcote	1957–1988
Morris Williams	Liberal	Doncaster	1973–1988
John Wilton	Labor	Broadmeadows	1962–1985
Alan Wood	Liberal	Swan Hill	1973–1983

^{1} Gippsland South MLA Neil McInnes was elected as a representative of the National Party, but defected to the Liberal Party in August 1980.
^{2} In April 1981, the Labor member for Morwell, Derek Amos, resigned due to ill health. Labor candidate Valerie Callister won the resulting by-election on 27 June 1981.
^{3} In July 1981, the Liberal member for Kew and Premier of Victoria, Rupert Hamer, resigned. Liberal candidate Prue Sibree won the resulting by-election on 15 August 1981.
