= Members of the Victorian Legislative Assembly, 1976–1979 =

- ←1973–1976 1979–1982→

This is a list of members of the Victorian Legislative Assembly from 1976 to 1979, as elected at the 1976 state election:

Name	Party	Electorate	Term in office
Derek Amos	Labor	Morwell	1970–1981
Hon Tom Austin	Liberal	Ripon	1972–1992
Hon Jim Balfour	Liberal	Narracan	1955–1982
Norman Billing	Liberal	Springvale	1967–1979
Hayden Birrell	Liberal	Geelong West	1961–1982
Bill Borthwick	Liberal	Monbulk	1960–1982
Cec Burgin	Liberal	Polwarth	1970–1985
John Cain	Labor	Bundoora	1976–1992
Ian Cathie	Labor	Carrum	1976–1988
Geoff Coleman	Liberal	Syndal	1976–1982, 1985–1999
Peter Collins	Liberal	Noble Park	1976–1982
George Cox	Liberal	Mitcham	1976–1982
Steve Crabb	Labor	Knox	1976–1992
Max Crellin	Liberal	Sandringham	1970–1982
Jack Culpin	Labor	Glenroy	1976–1988
Hon Brian Dixon	Liberal	St Kilda	1964–1982
Hon Val Doube	Labor	Albert Park	1950–1961, 1970–1979
Hon Roberts Dunstan	Liberal	Dromana	1956–1982
Bill Ebery	Liberal	Midlands	1973–1985
Tom Edmunds	Labor	Ascot Vale	1967–1988
Bruce Evans	National	Gippsland East	1961–1992
Tom Evans	Liberal	Ballarat North	1960–1988
Bill Fogarty	Labor	Sunshine	1973–1988
Robert Fordham	Labor	Footscray	1970–1992
Charles Francis	Liberal/Independent ^{[2]}	Caulfield	1976–1979
Jack Ginifer	Labor	Keilor	1966–1982
Phil Gude	Liberal	Geelong East	1976–1979, 1985–1999
Athol Guy ^{[5]}	Liberal	Gisborne	1971–1979
Hon Rupert Hamer	Liberal	Kew	1971–1981
Eddie Hann	National	Rodney	1973–1989
Hon Geoff Hayes	Liberal	Wantirna	1967–1982
Clyde Holding ^{[4]}	Labor	Richmond	1962–1977
Neville Hudson	Liberal	Werribee	1976–1979
Ken Jasper	National	Murray Valley	1976–2010
Doug Jennings	Liberal/Independent ^{[2]}	Westernport	1976–1979
Hon Walter Jona	Liberal	Hawthorn	1964–1985
Barry Jones ^{[3]}	Labor	Melbourne	1972–1977
Hon Jeff Kennett	Liberal	Burwood	1976–1999
Carl Kirkwood	Labor	Preston	1970–1988
Norman Lacy	Liberal	Warrandyte	1973–1982
Hon Lou Lieberman	Liberal	Benambra	1976–1992
Alan Lind	Labor	Dandenong	1952–1955, 1969–1979
Sam Loxton	Liberal	Prahran	1955–1979
Donald Mackinnon	Liberal	Box Hill	1976–1982
Hon Rob Maclellan	Liberal	Berwick	1970–2002
Peter McArthur	Liberal	Ringwood	1976–1982
Jim McCabe	National	Lowan	1964–1967, 1970–1979
Daryl McClure	Liberal	Bendigo	1973–1982
Neil McInnes	National	Gippsland South	1973–1982
Don McKellar	Liberal	Portland	1967–1970, 1973–1985
Ian McLaren	Liberal	Bennettswood	1945–1947, 1965–1979
Jack Mutton	Independent	Coburg	1967–1979
Jeannette Patrick	Liberal	Brighton	1976–1985
Jim Plowman	Liberal	Evelyn	1973–1982, 1985–1999
Hon Joe Rafferty	Liberal	Glenhuntly	1955–1979
Hon Jim Ramsay	Liberal	Balwyn	1973–1988
Llew Reese	Liberal	Heatherton	1967–1979
Keith Remington ^{[3]}	Labor	Melbourne	1977–1988
John Richardson	Liberal	Forest Hill	1976–2002
Tom Roper	Labor	Brunswick	1973–1994
Peter Ross-Edwards	National	Shepparton	1967–1991
Hon Alan Scanlan	Liberal	Oakleigh	1961–1979
Theo Sidiropoulos ^{[4]}	Labor	Richmond	1977–1988
Jim Simmonds	Labor	Reservoir	1969–1992
Jack Simpson	Labor	Niddrie	1976–1988
Bruce Skeggs	Liberal	Ivanhoe	1973–1982
Aurel Smith	Liberal	South Barwon	1967–1982
Hon Ian Smith	Liberal	Warrnambool	1967–1983, 1985–1999
Bill Stephen	Liberal	Ballarat South	1964–1979
Gordon Stirling	Labor	Williamstown	1973–1988
Bob Suggett	Liberal	Bentleigh	1955–1979
Bill Templeton	Liberal	Mentone	1967–1985
Hon Lindsay Thompson	Liberal	Malvern	1970–1982
Pauline Toner ^{[1]}	Labor	Greensborough	1977–1989
Neil Trezise	Labor	Geelong North	1964–1992
Tom Trewin	National	Benalla	1961–1982
Monte Vale ^{[1]}	Liberal	Greensborough	1967–1970, 1973, 1973–1977
Graeme Weideman	Liberal	Frankston	1976–1982, 1985–1996
Hon Sir Kenneth Wheeler	Liberal	Essendon	1958–1979
Milton Whiting	National	Mildura	1962–1988
Frank Wilkes	Labor	Northcote	1957–1988
Morris Williams	Liberal	Doncaster	1973–1988
John Wilton	Labor	Broadmeadows	1962–1985
Alan Wood	Liberal	Swan Hill	1973–1983

^{1} On 10 September 1977, the Liberal member for Greensborough, Monte Vale, died. Labor candidate Pauline Toner won the resulting by-election on 5 November 1977.
^{2} Two Liberal MLAs, Charles Francis (Caulfield) and Doug Jennings (Westernport) were expelled from the Liberal Party in September 1977 after abstaining on an opposition no-confidence motion over Housing Commission of Victoria land deals. Both MLAs served out their terms as independents.
^{3} In November 1977, the Labor member for Melbourne, Barry Jones, resigned to contest the federal seat of Lalor at the 1977 federal election. Labor candidate Keith Remington won the resulting by-election on 17 December 1977.
^{4} In November 1977, the Labor member for Richmond, Clyde Holding, resigned to contest the federal seat of Melbourne Ports at the 1977 federal election. Labor candidate Theo Sidiropoulos won the resulting by-election on 17 December 1977.
^{5} Gisborne Liberal MLA Athol Guy resigned due to ill health in March 1979. No by-election was held due to the imminent 1979 state election.
