= Electoral results for the district of Ormond =

Victoria, Australia, district election results

This is a list of electoral results for the electoral district of Ormond in Victorian state elections.

== Members for Ormond ==
Member	Party	Term
Joe Rafferty	Liberal	1958–1967

== Election results ==
=== Elections in the 1960s ===
1964 Victorian state election: Ormond
Party	Candidate	Votes	%	±%
Liberal and Country	Joe Rafferty	12,035	50.9	+2.5
Labor	Kenneth Stone	8,500	35.9	+1.1
Democratic Labor	Robert Semmel	3,128	13.2	−3.6
Total formal votes		23,663	98.0	0.0
Informal votes		488	2.0	0.0
Turnout		24,151	94.6	−0.7
Two-party-preferred result
Liberal and Country	Joe Rafferty	14,694	62.1	−1.1
Labor	Kenneth Stone	8,969	37.9	+1.1
Liberal and Country hold		Swing	−1.1	

1961 Victorian state election: Ormond
Party	Candidate	Votes	%	±%
Liberal and Country	Joe Rafferty	11,214	48.4	−1.0
Labor	Kenneth Stone	8,075	34.8	+1.1
Democratic Labor	Robert Semmel	3,896	16.8	+1.7
Total formal votes		23,185	98.0	−0.3
Informal votes		453	2.0	+0.3
Turnout		23,638	95.3	−0.1
Two-party-preferred result
Liberal and Country	Joe Rafferty	13,477	63.2	−0.9
Labor	Kenneth Stone	8,526	36.8	+0.9
Liberal and Country hold		Swing	−0.9	

=== Elections in the 1950s ===
1958 Victorian state election: Ormond
Party	Candidate	Votes	%	±%
Liberal and Country	Joe Rafferty	11,252	49.5	
Labor	Robert Flanagan	7,686	38.8	
Democratic Labor	Robert Semmel	3,435	15.1	
Independent	Gilbert Smith	342	1.5	
Total formal votes		22,758	98.3	
Informal votes		342	1.7	
Turnout		23,100	95.4	
Two-party-preferred result
Liberal and Country	Joe Rafferty	14,559	64.1	
Labor	Robert Flanagan	8,156	35.9	
Liberal and Country hold		Swing		
