= Electoral district of Ormond =

Former electoral district in Victoria, Australia

Coordinates: 37°50′S 145°02′E

Ormond Victoria—Legislative Assembly
- State: Victoria
- Created: 1958
- Abolished: 1967
- Namesake: Suburb of Ormond
- Demographic: Metropolitan

Electoral district of Ormond was an electoral district of the Legislative Assembly in the Australian state of Victoria.

Ormond was created in the 1958 redistribution, when Caulfield East (along with five others) were abolished. Ormond was abolished in 1967 when nineteen electorates, including Glenhuntly, were created.

== Members ==
Member	Party	Term
Joe Rafferty	Liberal	1958–1967

== See also ==
- Parliaments of the Australian states and territories
- List of members of the Victorian Legislative Assembly
