= Keith Hamilton (politician) =

Australian politician

Minister for Agriculture
- In office October 1999 – November 2002
- Preceded by: Pat McNamara
- Succeeded by: Bob Cameron
- Constituency: Morwell

Minister for Aboriginal Affairs
- In office October 1999 – November 2002
- Preceded by: Ann Henderson
- Succeeded by: Gavin Jennings

Personal details
- Born: 9 May 1936 (age 89) Ballarat, Victoria
- Party: Labor Party
- Spouse: Kath Hamilton
- Profession: Teacher; Lecturer

Keith Graeme Hamilton (born 9 May 1936 in Ballarat, Victoria) is the former Labor Party member for Morwell in the Victorian Legislative Assembly.

Hamilton served as the Member for Morwell from October 1988 until being succeeded by fellow Labor Party member Brendan Jenkins, in November 2002.

Hamilton served in the Bracks Government's first term as Minister for Agriculture and Minister for Aboriginal Affairs.

Hamilton attended Ballarat Teachers' College, a predecessor institution of the University of Ballarat, graduating in 1955. He sat on the Ballarat Teachers' College Library Group Committee, the Sports Committee and won awards for football and athletics in 1955.

Victorian Legislative Assembly
Preceded by Valerie Callister	Member for Morwell; 1988–2002	Succeeded by Brendan Jenkins
