= Brendan Jenkins =

Australian politician

- In office November 2002 – November 2006
- Preceded by: Keith Hamilton
- Succeeded by: Russell Northe
- Constituency: Morwell

Personal details
- Born: 1 October 1959 (age 66) Bendigo, Victoria
- Party: Labor Party
- Profession: Power Station Operator

Brendan James Jenkins (born 1 October 1959 in Bendigo, Victoria) is the former Labor Party member for Morwell in the Victorian Legislative Assembly. Jenkins lost his seat to Nationals candidate Russell Northe after a swing to the Nationals in the 2006 election.
