= Russell Northe =

Australian politician

The Honourable Russell Northe

Member of the Victorian Legislative Assembly for Morwell
- In office 25 November 2006 – 26 November 2022
- Preceded by: Brendan Jenkins
- Succeeded by: Martin Cameron

Personal details
- Born: Russell John Northe; 6 February 1966 (age 60) Traralgon, Victoria, Australia
- Party: Independent (2017–present); National (2006–2017)
- Profession: Business manager Footballer; Football coach

Russell John Northe (born 6 February 1966) is an Australian former politician who was a member of the Victorian Legislative Assembly for Morwell from 2006 until his retirement in 2022. Elected as a member of the National Party, he resigned from the party in August 2017 and served the remainder of his parliamentary career as an independent member of parliament.

In 2023, he was sentenced to 21 months' imprisonment after pleading guilty to two counts of misconduct in public office arising from the submission of false documents in relation to parliamentary electorate office funding, with the sentencing judge finding the conduct involved the misuse of public funds to support gambling; he was eligible to apply for parole after 12 months.

== Early life and education ==
Northe was born in Traralgon, Victoria and attended Traralgon High School, completing Year 11 in 1982. In 2006, Northe completed a Certificate IV in Business.

== Political and parliamentary career ==
At the 2010 state election, Northe achieved the biggest pro-Coalition swing in the state to transform Morwell into one of the National Party's safest Victorian seats, with a two-party-preferred margin of 16.29% against Labor. Northe won Morwell on the primary vote, polling 56.24% in his own right, and won every polling booth except the small Yallourn North booth, where Labor recorded a narrow majority. With the Liberal/Nationals Coalition winning government, Northe was also appointed as Parliamentary Secretary for Small Business.

In 2014, Northe was elevated to Cabinet as Minister for Energy and Resources and Minister for Small Business. He held those ministerial portfolios until the defeat of the Napthine/Ryan Coalition Government at the 2014 state election. After the election defeat and the resignation of long-serving Nationals leader Peter Ryan, Northe pursued the party deputy leadership, but lost to first-term MP Steph Ryan.

In 2017, Northe resigned from the National Party. According to media reports, he had accrued significant debts exceeding $750,000 owed to over thirty local businessmen, friends, constituents party members, and his own parliamentary leader Peter Walsh, partly due to gambling. Those who were persuaded by Northe to lend him money were said to include former employees in his electorate office and a retrenched power station worker who lost a large portion of his redundancy package.

During the 2018 campaign, local and metropolitan media reported further allegations regarding Northe's personal debts and borrowing from community members. Northe was narrowly re-elected, achieving 19.6% of the primary vote, but receiving enough preferences from the Liberal and National Parties to defeat the Labor candidate with a two-party preferred vote of 51.8%. He pledged to be a "conservative independent" member.

In July 2022, Northe announced he would not recontest Morwell at the 2022 Victorian state election.

== IBAC investigation and conviction ==
In October 2022, Northe was charged with 45 offences by Victoria's Independent Broad-based Anti-corruption Commission (IBAC), and on 25 October 2023, was sentenced to 21 months in prison after pleading guilty to two counts of misconduct in public office.

In sentencing remarks delivered on 25 October 2023, the County Court described the offending as involving the preparation and submission of false documents in support of claims for electorate office funding, including false invoices and false bank statements, which were provided to an auditor to obtain audit certification before being submitted for reimbursement. The sentencing judge found that the false claims totalled $173,424.93 across the two charges.

The sentencing judge stated that in 2019 Northe deposited $143,893 of Victorian Electoral Commission money into a Tabcorp account and $34,650 into a Ladbrokes account, and that account records showed large numbers of bets during that period. Northe was sentenced to a total effective term of 21 months' imprisonment, with a non-parole period of 12 months.

Victorian Legislative Assembly
Preceded by Brendan Jenkins	Member for Morwell; 2006–2022	Succeeded by Martin Cameron
