= Martin Cameron (Victorian politician) =

Australian politician

Member of the Victorian Legislative Assembly for Morwell
- Incumbent
- Assumed office 26 November 2022
- Preceded by: Russell Northe

Personal details
- Political party: National

Martin Cameron is an Australian politician who is the current member for the district of Morwell in the Victorian Legislative Assembly. He is a member of the Nationals and was elected in the 2022 state election, following the retirement of former member Russell Northe.

Cameron has stated that he was a plumber.
