= Valerie Callister =

Australian politician

Valerie Joy Callister (born 16 June 1950) is a former Australian politician.

She was born in Leongatha to farmer Herbert Charles Callister and Alma Joyce. She attended local state schools and received a Bachelor of Arts from the Gippsland Institute of Advanced Education, a Diploma of Education from the State College of Victoria, and a Graduate Diploma in Health Administration from La Trobe University. She worked as a schoolteacher, teaching at Traralgon from 1975 to 1981. She joined the Labor Party in 1976, and in a 1981 by-election was elected to the Victorian Legislative Assembly as the member for Morwell. She was briefly unseated on a technicality in 1984, but served until 1988, when she retired. Following her retirement she worked as the regional Gippsland coordinator for Alcohol and Drug Services (1989–92), the Victorian state director of Greening Australia (1989–91), manager of the Moe/Narracan and Traralgon Community Health Centres (1992–95), operations manager (1995–97) and CEO (1997–2003) of the Latrobe Community Health Centre, president of the Latrobe Regional Hospital Board (2000–02) and regional director of the Department of Human Services (from 2002).

Victorian Legislative Assembly
Preceded by Derek Amos	Member for Morwell; 1981–1988	Succeeded by Keith Hamilton
