= Archie Tanner =

Australian politician

Archie Lionel Tanner (18 April 1908 – 23 August 1975) was an Australian politician.

He was born in Beverley in Western Australia to publican Edgar Tanner and Emily Prosser. His family moved to Victoria and he attended All Saints Grammar School in St Kilda before becoming an accountant with the Commercial Bank of Australia. On 3 June 1933, he married Edna May Smith, with whom he had two daughters. During World War II, he served with the Royal Australian Air Force. Tanner was a lightweight amateur boxing champion, and was a referee at the Olympic Games in Melbourne in 1956, Rome in 1960, Tokyo in 1964 and Mexico City in 1968, as well as at the Commonwealth Games in Perth in 1962 and Kingston, Jamaica, in 1966. In 1967 he was elected to the Victorian Legislative Assembly as the Liberal member for Morwell, but he was defeated in 1970. He returned to banking and retired in 1973. His brother Sir Edgar Tanner and nephew Ted Tanner also served in the Victorian Parliament. Tanner died at Dandenong in 1975.

Victorian Legislative Assembly
Preceded by Jim Balfour	Member for Morwell; 1967–1970	Succeeded by Derek Amos
