= Joe Rafferty (Australian politician) =

Australian politician

Joseph Anstice Rafferty (10 January 1911 – 14 June 2000) was an Australian politician.

He was born in Launceston in Tasmania, the son of schoolteacher Col. R. A. Rafferty and Sarah Rose Anne Plummer. He was educated locally at both state and private schools and entered the public service in 1930. On 8 June 1940 he married Miriam Kathleen Richards, with whom he had two sons. He studied at the University of Tasmania, where he received a Bachelor of Arts in 1941. He had moved to Melbourne in 1940, where he studied law at the University of Melbourne. From 1945 he was personnel manager for Australian National Airways. A Liberal Party member, he was elected to the Victorian Legislative Assembly in 1955 as the member for Caulfield. He transferred to Ormond in 1958 and to Glenhuntly in 1967. In 1970 he was appointed Assistant Minister of Education (until 1972) as well as Minister of Labour and Industry. In 1973 he was further appointed Minister for Consumer Affairs, and in 1975 Minister for Federal Affairs. In 1976 he relinquished his previous portfolios to become Minister of Transport, a position he held until 1978. He was Chief Secretary until his retirement in 1979 to become Agent-General in London. Rafferty died in 2000.

Victorian Legislative Assembly
| Preceded by Alexander Dennett | Member for Caulfield; 1955–1958 | Succeeded by Alexander Fraser |
| New seat | Member for Ormond; 1958–1967 | Abolished |
| New seat | Member for Glenhuntly; 1976–1979 | Succeeded by Gerard Vaughan |
