= Derek Amos =

Australian politician

Derek Godfry Ian Amos OAM (born 5 August 1942) is an Australian politician.

Amos was born at Greenford, London, to carpenter Harold Arthur Edward Amos and Irene Mary. He attended Traralgon High School and worked as a painter from 1956. In 1962 he married Noela Matters, with whom he had three children. A painting contractor from 1963, he also worked as an insurance salesman and driver. In 1966, motivated by opposition to the Vietnam War, he joined the Labor Party, becoming treasurer of the Traralgon branch. In 1967 he was president of Latrobe Valley Young Labor.

In 1970 Amos was elected to the Victorian Legislative Assembly for Morwell. He was the party spokesman on state development from 1971 to 1973 and on minerals and energy from 1973 to 1981, and contested the leadership in 1976 without success. On 27 April 1981 he resigned due to ill health.

As part of the 2019 Queen's Birthday Honours, Amos was appointed a recipient of the Medal of the Order of Australia.

Victorian Legislative Assembly
| Preceded by Archie Tanner | Member for Morwell; 1970–1981 | Succeeded by Valerie Callister |
