= Electoral district of Morwell =

State electoral district of Victoria, Australia

Morwell Victoria—Legislative Assembly
- Interactive map of electoral district boundaries from the 2022 state election
- State: Victoria
- Created: 1955
- MP: Martin Cameron
- Party: National
- Namesake: Morwell
- Electors: 48,406 (2018)
- Area: 908 km^{2} (350.6 sq mi)
- Demographic: Rural
Electorates around Morwell:
Narracan	Narracan	Gippsland South
Narracan	Morwell	Gippsland South
Gippsland South	Gippsland South	Gippsland South

The electoral district of Morwell is an electoral district of the Victorian Legislative Assembly. It covers the regional centres of Moe, Morwell and Traralgon, as well as the surrounding rural areas in the middle of Gippsland.

Created in 1955, it was held by the Liberals until the 1970 election, when it was won by Labor. They held the seat until the 2006 election, when the Nationals gained the seat. In 2017, Nationals MP Russell Northe resigned from the party, becoming an independent. At the 2022 election, the Nationals regained the seat with Martin Cameron being elected.

== Members for Morwell ==
Member	Party	Term
Jim Balfour	Liberal	1955–1967
Archie Tanner	Liberal	1967–1970
Derek Amos	Labor	1970–1981
Valerie Callister	Labor	1981–1988
Keith Hamilton	Labor	1988–2002
Brendan Jenkins	Labor	2002–2006
Russell Northe	National	2006–2017
Russell Northe	Independent	2017–2022
Martin Cameron	National	2022–present

== Election results ==
2022 Victorian state election: Morwell
Party	Candidate	Votes	%	±%
Labor	Kate Maxfield	13,601	31.5	−6.8
National	Martin Cameron	9,902	22.9	+14.1
Liberal	Dale Harriman	6,710	15.5	+0.3
One Nation	Allan Hicken	2,648	6.1	+6.1
Independent	Sharon Gibson	2,515	5.8	+5.8
Shooters, Fishers, Farmers	David Snelling	2044	4.7	−1.1
Greens	Rochelle Hine	1,830	4.2	+0.5
Independent	Tracie Lund	1,206	2.8	+1.0
Freedom	Alex Maidana	900	2.1	+2.1
Family First	Brendan Clarke	749	1.7	+1.7
Animal Justice	Jessica McAuliffe	687	1.6	+1.6
Independent	Lisa Proctor	469	1.1	+1.1
Total formal votes		43,261	92.5	+0.1
Informal votes		3,526	7.5	−0.1
Turnout		46,787	87.0	−1.7
Two-party-preferred result
National	Martin Cameron	23,541	54.4	+8.4
Labor	Kate Maxfield	19,720	45.6	−8.4
National notional gain from Labor		Swing	+8.4	
