= Jim Balfour =

Australian politician

The Hon James Charles Murray Balfour MP
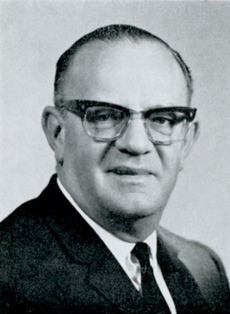

Minister for Minerals and Energy
- In office 24 August 1972 – 6 September 1977
- Premier: Rupert Hamer
- Preceded by: new ministry
- Succeeded by: Digby Crozier

Minister for Fuel & Power Minister of Mines
- In office 16 May 1967 – 4 June 1981
- Premier: Henry Bolte; Rupert Hamer
- Preceded by: George Reid (Fuel & Power); Thomas Darcy (Mines)
- Succeeded by: new ministry

Minister of Lands Minister of Soldier Settlement Minister for Conservation
- In office 14 July 1964 – 2 April 1967
- Premier: Henry Bolte
- Preceded by: Keith Turnbull
- Succeeded by: Bill Borthwick

Member of the Victorian Legislative Assembly for Narracan
- In office 29 April 1967 – 1 February 1982
- Preceded by: new seat
- Succeeded by: John Delzoppo

Member of the Victorian Legislative Assembly for Morwell
- In office 28 May 1955 – 2 April 1967
- Preceded by: new seat
- Succeeded by: Archie Tanner

Personal details
- Born: September 1914 Windsor, Victoria
- Died: 19 May 1990 (aged 75) Willow Grove, Victoria
- Party: Liberal Party
- Spouse: Mary Emma Savige
- Education: Geelong College

James Charles Murray Balfour, CBE (30 September 1914 – 19 May 1990) was a long-serving Member of Legislative Assembly (MLA) and Cabinet Minister in the Legislative Assembly, in the state Parliament of Victoria, Australia.

Born in the Melbourne suburb of Windsor to James Miller Balfour and his wife Katrine Elizabeth Alice (née Murray), Balfour was educated at Geelong College. He went on to become a dairy farmer, settling at Willow Grove near Trafalgar in the Latrobe Valley of Gippsland, Victoria.

On 6 February 1937 he married Mary Emma Savige, with whom he had five sons.

From 1946 to 1967, Balfour served on Narracan Shire Council, and served as President from 1946 to 1947, 1950–1951, and 1960–1961.

In 1955, he was elected to the Victorian Legislative Assembly for Morwell, representing the Liberal Party.

From 1958 to 1961 he was Government Whip, and from 1961 to 1964 Cabinet Secretary. In 1964, he entered Cabinet as Minister of Water Supply and Mines, a portfolio that was reorganised to become Lands, Soldier Settlement and Conservation a few months later. In 1967, he moved to the new seat of Narracan and became Minister of Fuel and Power and of Mines. In 1977 he became Minister for Minerals and Energy, a position from which he resigned on 3 February 1981, in readiness for his retirement at the 1982 election.

In 1981, his service was honoured with a Commander of the Most Excellent Order of the British Empire (CBE).

Following retirement from politics at the Victorian state election in 1982, he was involved in the regional Technical and Further Education (TAFE) program and other community activities, particularly in the Latrobe Valley. He died in 1990.

Victorian Legislative Assembly
New seat	Member for Morwell; 1955–1967	Succeeded by Archie Tanner
New seat	Member for Narracan; 1967–1982	Succeeded by John Delzoppo
