= Electoral district of Glenhuntly =

Glenhuntly Victoria—Legislative Assembly
- State: Victoria
- Created: 1967
- Abolished: 1985
- Namesake: Suburb of Glen Huntly
- Demographic: Metropolitan
- Coordinates: 37°54′S 145°03′E

Electoral district of Glenhuntly was an electoral district of the Legislative Assembly in the Australian state of Victoria.

== Members for Glenhuntly ==
Member	Party	Term
Joe Rafferty	Liberal	1967–1979
Gerard Vaughan	Labor	1979–1985
