= Members of the Victorian Legislative Assembly, 1982–1985 =

- ←1979–1982 1985–1988→

This is a list of members of the Victorian Legislative Assembly from 1982 to 1985, as elected at the 1982 state election:

Name	Party	Electorate	Term in office
Hon Tom Austin	Liberal	Ripon	1972–1992
Alan Brown	Liberal	Westernport	1979–1996
Cec Burgin	Liberal	Polwarth	1970–1985
Hon John Cain	Labor	Bundoora	1976–1992
Valerie Callister ^{[6]}	Labor	Morwell	1981–1988
Hon Ian Cathie	Labor	Carrum	1976–1988
Ken Coghill	Labor	Werribee	1979–1996
Hon Steve Crabb	Labor	Knox	1976–1992
Jack Culpin	Labor	Glenroy	1976–1988
John Delzoppo	Liberal	Narracan	1982–1996
Harley Dickinson	Liberal	South Barwon	1982–1992
Bill Ebery	Liberal	Midlands	1973–1985
Hon Tom Edmunds	Labor	Ascot Vale	1967–1988
Graham Ernst	Labor	Geelong East	1979–1992
Bruce Evans	National	Gippsland East	1961–1992
Tom Evans	Liberal	Ballarat North	1960–1988
Bill Fogarty	Labor	Sunshine	1973–1988
Hon Robert Fordham	Labor	Footscray	1970–1992
Peter Gavin	Labor	Coburg	1979–1992
Jack Ginifer ^{[1]}	Labor	Keilor	1966–1982
David Gray	Labor	Syndal	1982–1985
Eddie Hann	National	Rodney	1973–1989
John Harrowfield	Labor	Mitcham	1982–1992
David Hassett	Labor	Dromana	1982–1985
Jane Hill	Labor	Frankston	1982–1992
Lou Hill	Labor	Warrandyte	1982–1988
Gordon Hockley	Labor	Bentleigh	1979–1988
Graham Ihlein	Labor	Sandringham	1982–1985
Ken Jasper	National	Murray Valley	1976–2010
Hon Rob Jolly	Labor	Dandenong	1979–1992
Hon Walter Jona	Liberal	Hawthorn	1964–1985
Adam Kempton ^{[4]}	Liberal	Warrnambool	1983–1985
David Kennedy	Labor	Bendigo	1982–1992
Hon Jeff Kennett	Liberal	Burwood	1976–1999
Kevin King ^{[3]}	Labor	Springvale	1979–1983
Carl Kirkwood	Labor	Preston	1970–1988
Geoff Leigh^{[2]}	Liberal	Malvern	1982–2002
Hon Lou Lieberman	Liberal	Benambra	1976–1992
Hon Rob Maclellan	Liberal	Berwick	1970–2002
Hon Race Mathews	Labor	Oakleigh	1979–1992
Andrew McCutcheon	Labor	St Kilda	1982–1992
Max McDonald	Labor	Evelyn	1982–1992
Bill McGrath	National	Lowan	1979–1999
Don McKellar	Liberal	Portland	1967–1970, 1973–1985
Pat McNamara	National	Benalla	1982–2000
Eddie Micallef ^{[3]}	Labor	Springvale	1983–1999
Bob Miller	Labor	Prahran	1979–1985
Doug Newton	Labor	Bennettswood	1982–1985
Terry Norris	Labor	Noble Park	1982–1992
Jeannette Patrick	Liberal	Brighton	1976–1985
Neil Pope	Labor	Monbulk	1982–1992
Hon Jim Ramsay	Liberal	Balwyn	1973–1988
Margaret Ray	Labor	Box Hill	1982–1992
Keith Remington	Labor	Melbourne	1977–1988
Tom Reynolds	Liberal	Gisborne	1979–1999
John Richardson	Liberal	Forest Hill	1976–2002
Hon Tom Roper	Labor	Brunswick	1973–1994
Peter Ross-Edwards	National	Shepparton	1967–1991
Barry Rowe	Labor	Essendon	1979–1992
Don Saltmarsh	Liberal	Wantirna	1982–1985
George Seitz ^{[1]}	Labor	Keilor	1982–2010
Frank Sheehan	Labor	Ballarat South	1982–1992
Tony Sheehan	Labor	Ivanhoe	1982–1985, 1988–1998
Hayden Shell	Labor	Geelong West	1982–1992
Kay Setches	Labor	Ringwood	1982–1992
Prue Sibree	Liberal	Kew	1981–1988
Jim Simmonds	Labor	Reservoir	1969–1992
Theo Sidiropoulos	Labor	Richmond	1977–1988
Jack Simpson	Labor	Niddrie	1976–1988
Hon Ian Smith ^{[4]}	Liberal	Warrnambool	1967–1983, 1985–1999
Hon Peter Spyker	Labor	Heatherton	1979–1992
Barry Steggall ^{[5]}	National	Swan Hill	1983–2002
Gordon Stirling	Labor	Williamstown	1973–1988
Ted Tanner	Liberal	Caulfield	1979–1996
Bill Templeton	Liberal	Mentone	1967–1985
Hon Lindsay Thompson^{[2]}	Liberal	Malvern	1970–1982
Hon Pauline Toner	Labor	Greensborough	1977–1989
Neil Trezise	Labor	Geelong North	1964–1992
Gerard Vaughan	Labor	Glenhuntly	1979–1996
Tom Wallace	National	Gippsland South	1982–1992
Bunna Walsh	Labor	Albert Park	1979–1992
Milton Whiting	National	Mildura	1962–1988
Hon Frank Wilkes	Labor	Northcote	1957–1988
Morris Williams	Liberal	Doncaster	1973–1988
John Wilton	Labor	Broadmeadows	1962–1985
Hon Alan Wood ^{[5]}	Liberal	Swan Hill	1973–1983

^{1} In May 1982, the Labor member for Keilor, Jack Ginifer, resigned due to being diagnosed with a terminal illness. Labor candidate George Seitz won the resulting by-election on 17 July 1982.
^{2} In November 1982, the Liberal member for Malvern and former Premier of Victoria, Lindsay Thompson, resigned. Liberal candidate Geoff Leigh won the resulting by-election on 4 December 1982.
^{3} On 28 January 1983, the Labor member for Springvale, Kevin King, died. Labor candidate Eddie Micallef won the resulting by-election on 19 March 1983.
^{4} In March 1983, the Liberal member for Warrnambool, Ian Smith, resigned to contest Liberal preselection for the Wannon federal by-election (as it turned out, he lost to David Hawker). Liberal candidate Adam Kempton won the resulting by-election on 7 May 1983.
^{5} In March 1983, the Liberal member for Swan Hill, Alan Wood, resigned. Nationals candidate Barry Steggall won the resulting by-election on 7 May 1983.
^{6} The Court of Disputed Returns found in 1984 that the Labor member for Morwell, Valerie Callister, was a member of the Environment Council at the time of her election and the Solicitor-General advised that her seat had become vacant. However, a by-election was not held as the Legislative Assembly passed a resolution to excuse her under s.61A of the Constitution Act.
