= Results of the 1973 Victorian state election (Legislative Assembly) =

Australian state election results

Victorian state election, 19 May 1973 Legislative Assembly << 1970–1976 >>
Enrolled voters	2,088,984				
Votes cast	1,954,005		Turnout	93.54	-1.03
Informal votes	56,691		Informal	2.90	-0.29
Summary of votes by party
Party	Primary votes	%	Swing	Seats	Change
Liberal	803,382	42.34	+5.64	46	+4
Labor	789,561	41.61	+0.19	18	-4
Democratic Labor	147,890	7.79	-5.51	0	±0
Country	144,818	5.96	-0.44	8	±0
Independent	10,349	0.55	-1.17	1	±0
Other	33,103	1.74	+1.29	0	±0
Total	1,897,314			73	
Two-party-preferred
Liberal	1,048,100	55.2	+1.0		
Labor	849,214	44.8	–1.0		

This is a list of electoral district results for the Victorian 1973 election.

== Results by electoral district ==
=== Albert Park ===
1973 Victorian state election: Albert Park
Party	Candidate	Votes	%	±%
Labor	Val Doube	12,920	65.2	+7.4
Liberal	Norman Walker	5,290	26.7	−2.1
Democratic Labor	Monica McGeoch	1,620	8.2	−5.2
Total formal votes		19,830	96.0	+0.6
Informal votes		827	4.0	−0.6
Turnout		20,657	91.2	−1.2
Two-party-preferred result
Labor	Val Doube	13,163	66.4	+6.6
Liberal	Norman Walker	6,667	33.6	−6.6
Labor hold		Swing	+6.6	

=== Ballarat North ===
1973 Victorian state election: Ballarat North
Party	Candidate	Votes	%	±%
Liberal	Tom Evans	13,631	53.8	+4.3
Labor	Jim Caddy	9,513	37.6	+2.6
Democratic Labor	Moya Schaefer	2,171	8.6	−6.9
Total formal votes		25,315	98.1	0.0
Informal votes		495	1.9	0.0
Turnout		25,810	95.1	−1.1
Two-party-preferred result
Liberal	Tom Evans	15,477	61.1	−2.7
Labor	Jim Caddy	9,838	38.9	+2.7
Liberal hold		Swing	−2.7	

=== Ballarat South ===
1973 Victorian state election: Ballarat South
Party	Candidate	Votes	%	±%
Liberal	Bill Stephen	10,197	43.1	−1.1
Labor	Frank Sheehan	9,730	41.1	+1.9
Democratic Labor	John Parkin	2,117	8.9	−7.6
Country	Graeme Orr	1,613	6.8	+6.8
Total formal votes		23,657	97.3	−0.3
Informal votes		654	2.7	+0.3
Turnout		24,311	94.5	−1.2
Two-party-preferred result
Liberal	Bill Stephen	13,010	55.0	−1.1
Labor	Frank Sheehan	9,730	45.0	+1.1
Liberal hold		Swing	−1.1	

=== Balwyn ===
1973 Victorian state election: Balwyn
Party	Candidate	Votes	%	±%
Liberal	Jim Ramsay	17,009	62.9	+8.4
Labor	Joan Coxsedge	8,290	30.7	−1.4
Democratic Labor	James Marmion	1,729	6.4	−6.9
Total formal votes		27,028	98.3	+0.3
Informal votes		461	1.7	−0.3
Turnout		27,489	92.2	−1.2
Two-party-preferred result
Liberal	Jim Ramsay	18,478	68.4	+2.5
Labor	Joan Coxsedge	8,550	31.6	−2.5
Liberal hold		Swing	+2.5	

=== Bellarine ===
1973 Victorian state election: Bellarine
Party	Candidate	Votes	%	±%
Liberal	Aurel Smith	15,095	50.9	+4.4
Labor	Royston Lawson	12,231	41.3	−0.3
Democratic Labor	Ray Evans	2,323	7.8	−4.1
Total formal votes		29,649	98.1	0.0
Informal votes		586	1.9	0.0
Turnout		30,235	94.4	−1.2
Two-party-preferred result
Liberal	Aurel Smith	17,070	57.6	+1.0
Labor	Royston Lawson	12,579	42.4	−1.0
Liberal hold		Swing	+1.0	

=== Benalla ===
1973 Victorian state election: Benalla
Party	Candidate	Votes	%	±%
Country	Tom Trewin	8,990	48.8	+2.7
Labor	James Scott	4,236	23.0	+1.2
Liberal	Vernon Dawson	3,209	17.4	−2.8
Democratic Labor	Christopher Cody	1,971	10.7	−1.2
Total formal votes		18,406	97.6	+0.1
Informal votes		449	2.4	−0.1
Turnout		18,855	94.8	−1.1
Two-party-preferred result
Country	Tom Trewin	13,705	74.5	−0.9
Labor	James Scott	4,701	25.5	+0.9
Country hold		Swing	−0.9	

=== Benambra ===
1973 Victorian state election: Benambra
Party	Candidate	Votes	%	±%
Country	Tom Mitchell	9,462	49.4	+2.1
Labor	Ian Thomas	5,525	28.8	+3.7
Liberal	Henry Petty	2,748	14.3	+3.7
Democratic Labor	James Osmotherly	1,435	7.5	−2.8
Total formal votes		19,170	97.3	+1.0
Informal votes		528	2.7	−1.0
Turnout		19,698	94.4	−0.7
Two-party-preferred result
Country	Tom Mitchell	13,305	69.4	−1.4
Labor	Ian Thomas	5,865	30.6	+1.4
Country hold		Swing	−1.4	

=== Bendigo ===
1973 Victorian state election: Bendigo
Party	Candidate	Votes	%	±%
Labor	David Boyle	10,926	43.7	−0.9
Liberal	Daryl McClure	9,557	38.2	−1.8
Country	Peter Pritchard	2,512	10.0	+10.0
Democratic Labor	Raymond Peterson	2,037	8.1	−7.2
Total formal votes		25,032	98.3	−0.1
Informal votes		442	1.7	+0.1
Turnout		25,474	96.2	+0.3
Two-party-preferred result
Liberal	Daryl McClure	13,743	54.9	+2.5
Labor	David Boyle	11,289	45.1	−2.5
Liberal hold		Swing	+2.5	

=== Bennettswood ===
1973 Victorian state election: Bennettswood
Party	Candidate	Votes	%	±%
Liberal	Ian McLaren	14,756	51.6	+6.9
Labor	Cyril Kennedy	11,964	41.8	−2.0
Democratic Labor	James Tighe	1,900	6.6	−4.9
Total formal votes		28,620	98.1	+0.1
Informal votes		538	1.9	−0.1
Turnout		29,158	94.7	−0.6
Two-party-preferred result
Liberal	Ian McLaren	16,371	57.2	+2.0
Labor	Cyril Kennedy	12,249	42.8	−2.0
Liberal hold		Swing	+2.0	

=== Bentleigh ===
1973 Victorian state election: Bentleigh
Party	Candidate	Votes	%	±%
Liberal	Bob Suggett	13,944	52.4	+9.0
Labor	Alexander McDonald	10,454	39.3	+1.5
Democratic Labor	Peter Madden	2,226	8.4	−2.4
Total formal votes		26,624	98.0	+1.3
Informal votes		529	2.0	−1.3
Turnout		27,153	94.7	−0.8
Two-party-preferred result
Liberal	Bob Suggett	15,830	59.5	+0.8
Labor	Alexander McDonald	10,794	40.5	−0.8
Liberal hold		Swing	+0.8	

=== Box Hill ===
1973 Victorian state election: Box Hill
Party	Candidate	Votes	%	±%
Liberal	Morris Williams	22,201	52.2	+8.5
Labor	Keith Remington	14,667	34.5	−2.5
Democratic Labor	James Brosnan	3,180	7.5	−5.8
Australia	John Franceschini	2,459	5.8	+5.8
Total formal votes		42,507	97.9	+0.4
Informal votes		907	2.1	−0.4
Turnout		43,414	94.1	−1.2
Two-party-preferred result
Liberal	Morris Williams	25,886	60.9	−0.1
Labor	Keith Remington	16,619	39.1	+0.1
Liberal hold		Swing	−0.1	

=== Brighton ===
1973 Victorian state election: Brighton
Party	Candidate	Votes	%	±%
Liberal	John Rossiter	13,807	58.5	+14.8
Labor	Peter Hansen	6,372	27.0	−4.4
Australia	Frederick Funnell	2,150	9.1	+9.1
Democratic Labor	Peter Lawlor	1,285	5.4	−3.7
Total formal votes		23,614	98.0	+0.2
Informal votes		471	2.0	−0.2
Turnout		24,085	93.1	+0.1
Two-party-preferred result
Liberal	John Rossiter	15,975	67.7	+2.1
Labor	Peter Hansen	7,639	32.3	−2.1
Liberal hold		Swing	+2.1	

=== Broadmeadows ===
1973 Victorian state election: Broadmeadows
Party	Candidate	Votes	%	±%
Labor	John Wilton	25,142	58.8	+0.8
Liberal	Claus Salger	12,004	28.1	+6.2
Democratic Labor	Francis Dowling	5,638	13.2	−6.9
Total formal votes		42,784	94.9	+0.1
Informal votes		2,316	5.1	−0.1
Turnout		45,100	94.7	−0.9
Two-party-preferred result
Labor	John Wilton	25,988	60.7	−0.3
Liberal	Claus Salger	16,796	39.3	+0.3
Labor hold		Swing	−0.3	

=== Brunswick East ===
1973 Victorian state election: Brunswick East
Party	Candidate	Votes	%	±%
Labor	David Bornstein	11,878	59.1	−1.4
Liberal	William Marriott	5,200	25.9	+0.8
Democratic Labor	Anthony Staunton	1,647	8.2	−6.2
Australia	Jonathon Sutton	980	4.9	+4.9
Communist	George Zangalis	398	2.0	+2.0
Total formal votes		20,103	91.5	−1.8
Informal votes		1,874	8.5	+1.8
Turnout		21,977	91.1	−1.3
Two-party-preferred result
Labor	David Bornstein	13,072	65.0	+2.4
Liberal	William Marriott	7,031	35.0	−2.4
Labor hold		Swing	+2.4	

=== Brunswick West ===
1973 Victorian state election: Brunswick West
Party	Candidate	Votes	%	±%
Labor	Tom Roper	11,387	51.9	+0.7
Liberal	Salvatore Gandolfo	7,705	35.1	+1.3
Democratic Labor	John Flint	2,831	12.9	−2.1
Total formal votes		21,923	96.1	+0.3
Informal votes		887	3.9	−0.3
Turnout		22,810	95.0	0.0
Two-party-preferred result
Labor	Tom Roper	11,812	53.9	+0.5
Liberal	Salvatore Gandolfo	10,111	46.1	−0.5
Labor hold		Swing	+0.5	

=== Camberwell ===
1973 Victorian state election: Camberwell
Party	Candidate	Votes	%	±%
Liberal	Vernon Wilcox	14,678	61.9	+7.8
Labor	Colin MacLeod	7,190	30.3	−2.6
Democratic Labor	Joseph Stanley	1,829	7.7	−5.2
Total formal votes		23,697	98.2	+0.4
Informal votes		421	1.8	−0.4
Turnout		24,118	93.2	+0.4
Two-party-preferred result
Liberal	Vernon Wilcox	16,233	68.5	+3.4
Labor	Colin MacLeod	7,464	31.5	−3.4
Liberal hold		Swing	+3.4	

=== Caulfield ===
1973 Victorian state election: Caulfield
Party	Candidate	Votes	%	±%
Liberal	Sir Edgar Tanner	14,236	55.1	+6.7
Labor	John Graham	10,096	39.1	+7.5
Democratic Labor	Peter Grant	1,504	5.8	−6.5
Total formal votes		25,836	96.8	+0.9
Informal votes		843	3.2	−0.9
Turnout		26,679	90.9	−0.6
Two-party-preferred result
Liberal	Sir Edgar Tanner	15,515	60.0	−2.9
Labor	John Graham	10,321	40.0	+2.9
Liberal hold		Swing	−2.9	

=== Coburg ===
1973 Victorian state election: Coburg
Party	Candidate	Votes	%	±%
Labor	Frank Cox	8,581	39.8	+1.0
Independent	Jack Mutton	6,156	28.5	+1.2
Liberal	Louis Mingaars	5,046	23.4	+1.6
Democratic Labor	Timothy Gerrard	1,806	8.4	−3.9
Total formal votes		21,589	95.7	−0.1
Informal votes		967	4.3	+0.1
Turnout		22,556	95.6	+0.5
Two-candidate-preferred result
Independent	Jack Mutton	12,505	57.9	−1.0
Labor	Frank Cox	9,084	42.1	+1.0
Independent hold		Swing	−1.0	

=== Dandenong ===
1973 Victorian state election: Dandenong
Party	Candidate	Votes	%	±%
Labor	Alan Lind	20,241	51.0	−0.4
Liberal	Ivan Warner	16,331	41.1	+5.9
Democratic Labor	Kevin Leydon	3,141	7.9	−5.6
Total formal votes		39,713	96.6	−0.3
Informal votes		1,386	3.4	+0.3
Turnout		41,099	95.0	−0.8
Two-party-preferred result
Labor	Alan Lind	20,712	52.2	−1.2
Liberal	Ivan Warner	19,001	47.8	+1.2
Labor hold		Swing	−1.2	

=== Deer Park ===
1973 Victorian state election: Deer Park
Party	Candidate	Votes	%	±%
Labor	Jack Ginifer	25,857	59.8	+5.1
Liberal	Alan McGillivray	13,070	30.2	+3.6
Democratic Labor	Alfred Wisniewski	4,284	9.9	−8.8
Total formal votes		43,211	93.5	−0.1
Informal votes		2,997	6.5	+0.1
Turnout		46,208	94.4	−1.3
Two-party-preferred result
Labor	Jack Ginifer	26,499	61.3	+3.8
Liberal	Alan McGillivray	16,712	38.7	−3.8
Labor hold		Swing	+3.8	

=== Dromana ===
1973 Victorian state election: Dromana
Party	Candidate	Votes	%	±%
Liberal	Roberts Dunstan	14,666	54.8	+0.3
Labor	Jim Snow	10,144	37.9	+3.6
Democratic Labor	Elizabeth Barton	1,943	7.3	−3.9
Total formal votes		26,753	97.9	+0.1
Informal votes		583	2.1	−0.1
Turnout		27,336	92.4	−1.5
Two-party-preferred result
Liberal	Roberts Dunstan	16,318	61.0	−3.9
Labor	Jim Snow	10,435	39.0	+3.9
Liberal hold		Swing	−3.9	

=== Dundas ===
1973 Victorian state election: Dundas
Party	Candidate	Votes	%	±%
Labor	Edward Lewis	7,478	41.3	+7.1
Liberal	Bruce Chamberlain	6,780	37.4	+7.5
Country	Alexander McLennan	2,867	15.8	−4.7
Democratic Labor	Patrick Healy	1,008	5.6	−2.7
Total formal votes		18,113	98.0	+1.6
Informal votes		374	2.0	−1.6
Turnout		18,487	96.1	−0.6
Two-party-preferred result
Liberal	Bruce Chamberlain	9,699	53.6	+7.4
Labor	Edward Lewis	8,414	46.4	−7.4
Liberal gain from Labor		Swing	+7.4	

=== Essendon ===
1973 Victorian state election: Essendon
Party	Candidate	Votes	%	±%
Labor	Ronald Kennelly	11,514	42.7	−3.0
Liberal	Kenneth Wheeler	11,232	41.6	+4.2
Democratic Labor	John Moloney	2,483	9.2	−7.6
Australia	Stanley Bell	1,205	4.5	+4.5
Defence of Government Schools	Lancelot Hutchinson	555	2.1	+2.1
Total formal votes		26,989	96.0	−0.8
Informal votes		1,113	4.0	+0.8
Turnout		28,102	95.1	−0.3
Two-party-preferred result
Liberal	Kenneth Wheeler	14,377	53.3	+2.6
Labor	Ronald Kennelly	12,612	46.7	−2.6
Liberal hold		Swing	+2.6	

=== Evelyn ===
1973 Victorian state election: Evelyn
Party	Candidate	Votes	%	±%
Liberal	Jim Plowman	11,762	50.1	+5.5
Labor	Raymond Donkin	9,651	41.1	−2.0
Democratic Labor	Francis Feltham	1,330	5.7	−2.7
Australia	Dennis Lacey	718	3.1	+3.1
Total formal votes		23,461	97.6	+0.2
Informal votes		568	2.4	−0.2
Turnout		24,029	92.9	−1.7
Two-party-preferred result
Liberal	Jim Plowman	13,251	56.5	+2.6
Labor	Raymond Donkin	10,210	43.5	−2.6
Liberal hold		Swing	+2.6	

=== Footscray ===
1973 Victorian state election: Footscray
Party	Candidate	Votes	%	±%
Labor	Robert Fordham	13,736	62.1	+0.7
Liberal	Edmond Murphy	5,790	26.2	−0.2
Democratic Labor	Bert Bailey	2,578	11.7	−0.6
Total formal votes		22,104	94.5	−0.2
Informal votes		1,276	5.5	+0.2
Turnout		23,380	94.3	−0.7
Two-party-preferred result
Labor	Robert Fordham	14,123	63.9	+0.6
Liberal	Edmond Murphy	7,981	36.1	−0.6
Labor hold		Swing	+0.6	

=== Frankston ===
1973 Victorian state election: Frankston
Party	Candidate	Votes	%	±%
Liberal	Edward Meagher	22,182	50.5	+2.5
Labor	Donald Mercer	16,854	38.4	−0.7
Australia	David Heath	2,479	5.6	+5.6
Democratic Labor	John Glynn	2,392	5.5	−7.4
Total formal votes		43,907	97.9	+0.3
Informal votes		921	2.1	−0.3
Turnout		44,828	93.0	−1.0
Two-party-preferred result
Liberal	Edward Meagher	25,454	58.0	−1.5
Labor	Donald Mercer	18,453	42.0	+1.5
Liberal hold		Swing	−1.5	

=== Geelong ===
1973 Victorian state election: Geelong
Party	Candidate	Votes	%	±%
Liberal	Hayden Birrell	11,481	49.1	+3.3
Labor	John O'Brien	9,211	39.4	−1.4
Democratic Labor	John Timberlake	1,882	8.1	−5.4
Australia	Guenter Sahr	790	3.4	+3.4
Total formal votes		23,364	97.8	−0.1
Informal votes		531	2.2	+0.1
Turnout		23,895	93.2	−1.9
Two-party-preferred result
Liberal	Hayden Birrell	13,619	58.3	+0.3
Labor	John O'Brien	9,745	41.7	−0.3
Liberal hold		Swing	+0.3	

=== Geelong North ===
1973 Victorian state election: Geelong North
Party	Candidate	Votes	%	±%
Labor	Neil Trezise	15,489	59.4	−0.3
Liberal	David Roffey	8,335	31.9	+3.3
Democratic Labor	James Jordan	2,261	8.7	−3.0
Total formal votes		26,085	96.7	−0.6
Informal votes		877	3.3	+0.6
Turnout		26,962	93.9	−1.2
Two-party-preferred result
Labor	Neil Trezise	15,828	60.7	−0.8
Liberal	David Roffey	10,257	39.3	+0.8
Labor hold		Swing	−0.8	

=== Gippsland East ===
1973 Victorian state election: Gippsland East
Party	Candidate	Votes	%	±%
Country	Bruce Evans	7,821	40.5	+3.6
Labor	Geoffrey Cox	6,002	31.1	+5.1
Liberal	John Sheehan	4,285	22.2	−2.3
Democratic Labor	Robert McMahon	1,201	6.2	−6.3
Total formal votes		19,309	97.8	+0.5
Informal votes		442	2.2	−0.5
Turnout		19,751	93.9	−0.5
Two-party-preferred result
Country	Bruce Evans	12,994	67.3	−3.5
Labor	Geoffrey Cox	6,315	32.7	+3.5
Country hold		Swing	−3.5	

=== Gippsland South ===
1973 Victorian state election: Gippsland South
Party	Candidate	Votes	%	±%
Liberal	James Taylor	8,377	41.4	+14.3
Country	Neil McInnes	5,962	29.4	−8.3
Labor	Russel Wilson	4,380	21.6	−1.2
Democratic Labor	John Condon	1,527	7.5	−4.9
Total formal votes		20,246	97.9	+0.2
Informal votes		429	2.1	−0.2
Turnout		20,675	93.5	−1.0
Two-candidate-preferred result
Country	Neil McInnes	10,129	50.03	+6.4
Liberal	James Taylor	10,117	49.97	−6.4
Country gain from Liberal		Swing	+6.4	

=== Gippsland West ===
1973 Victorian state election: Gippsland West
Party	Candidate	Votes	%	±%
Liberal	Rob Maclellan	8,780	45.6	+10.8
Labor	Miles Cahill	5,812	30.2	+0.5
Country	William Belfrage	2,114	11.0	−13.1
Democratic Labor	Noel Gleeson	1,285	6.7	−4.7
Country	Hugh Hendry	1,254	6.5	+6.5
Total formal votes		19,245	97.5	−0.2
Informal votes		485	2.5	+0.2
Turnout		19,730	94.5	−0.9
Two-party-preferred result
Liberal	Rob Maclellan	13,052	67.8	+15.2
Labor	Miles Cahill	6,193	32.2	−15.2
Liberal hold		Swing	+15.2	

=== Gisborne ===
1973 Victorian state election: Gisborne
Party	Candidate	Votes	%	±%
Liberal	Athol Guy	14,810	47.2	0.0
Labor	Ernest Jamieson	12,579	40.1	+2.0
Democratic Labor	Maurice Flynn	2,736	8.7	−4.3
Country	Peter Holzgrefe	1,258	4.0	+4.0
Total formal votes		31,383	97.7	+0.6
Informal votes		736	2.3	−0.6
Turnout		32,119	92.7	−1.9
Two-party-preferred result
Liberal	Athol Guy	18,243	58.1	−1.7
Labor	Ernest Jamieson	13,140	41.9	+1.7
Liberal hold		Swing	−1.7	

=== Glenhuntly ===
1973 Victorian state election: Glenhuntly
Party	Candidate	Votes	%	±%
Liberal	Joe Rafferty	12,944	48.8	+3.4
Labor	Kathleen Foster	10,237	38.6	−1.0
Democratic Labor	Terence Farrell	2,232	8.4	−6.7
Australia	Richard Franklin	1,131	4.3	+4.3
Total formal votes		26,544	97.1	+0.6
Informal votes		793	2.9	−0.6
Turnout		27,337	92.9	−0.3
Two-party-preferred result
Liberal	Joe Rafferty	14,813	55.8	−0.3
Labor	Kathleen Foster	11,731	44.2	+0.3
Liberal hold		Swing	−0.3	

=== Glen Iris ===
1973 Victorian state election: Glen Iris
Party	Candidate	Votes	%	±%
Liberal	Jim MacDonald	13,690	56.5	+2.9
Labor	Douglas Gammon	7,064	29.2	−5.5
Democratic Labor	Edward Cleary	1,749	7.2	−4.4
Australia	Jack Hammond	1,731	7.1	+7.1
Total formal votes		24,234	98.3	+0.4
Informal votes		425	1.7	−0.4
Turnout		24,659	92.9	−0.5
Two-party-preferred result
Liberal	Jim MacDonald	15,869	65.5	+2.0
Labor	Douglas Gammon	8,365	34.5	−2.0
Liberal hold		Swing	+2.0	

=== Greensborough ===
1973 Victorian state election: Greensborough
Party	Candidate	Votes	%	±%
Labor	Bob Fell	19,155	43.8	−0.5
Liberal	Monte Vale	18,524	42.4	+6.8
Democratic Labor	Ernest Dobson	2,886	6.6	−5.6
Australia	Flora Miller	2,546	5.8	+5.8
Independent	David Close	590	1.4	+1.4
Total formal votes		43,701	97.7	−0.1
Informal votes		1,018	2.3	+0.1
Turnout		44,719	94.2	−1.2
Two-party-preferred result
Liberal	Monte Vale	21,853	50.01	+2.0
Labor	Bob Fell	21,848	49.99	−2.0
Liberal gain from Labor		Swing	+2.0	

- This result was declared void and a by-election was held on 13 October 1973, in which Monte Vale retained this seat for the Liberal party.

=== Hampden ===
1973 Victorian state election: Hampden
Party	Candidate	Votes	%	±%
Liberal	Tom Austin	7,948	44.4	+1.5
Labor	Raymond Blizzard	6,309	35.3	+4.2
Country	Alan Plant	2,491	13.9	−2.3
Democratic Labor	Francis O'Brien	1,132	6.3	−3.5
Total formal votes		17,880	98.9	+0.6
Informal votes		196	1.1	−0.6
Turnout		18,076	95.7	−0.4
Two-party-preferred result
Liberal	Tom Austin	11,086	62.0	−3.8
Labor	Raymond Blizzard	6,794	38.0	+3.8
Liberal hold		Swing	−3.8	

=== Hawthorn ===
1973 Victorian state election: Hawthorn
Party	Candidate	Votes	%	±%
Liberal	Walter Jona	12,190	51.0	+5.0
Labor	Evan Walker	8,800	36.8	−4.9
Democratic Labor	Bernard Gaynor	1,785	7.5	−4.8
Australia	John Worcester	1,136	4.8	+4.8
Total formal votes		23,911	97.1	+0.3
Informal votes		703	2.9	−0.3
Turnout		24,614	89.6	−2.8
Two-party-preferred result
Liberal	Walter Jona	14,162	59.2	+2.6
Labor	Evan Walker	9,749	40.8	−2.6
Liberal hold		Swing	+2.6	

=== Heatherton ===
1973 Victorian state election: Heatherton
Party	Candidate	Votes	%	±%
Liberal	Norman Billing	18,288	48.7	+10.9
Labor	John Wilson	16,805	44.8	−0.1
Democratic Labor	Brian Sherman	2,450	6.5	−6.2
Total formal votes		37,543	96.9	+0.6
Informal votes		1,181	3.1	−0.6
Turnout		38,724	94.2	−1.0
Two-party-preferred result
Liberal	Norman Billing	20,409	54.4	+4.0
Labor	John Wilson	17,134	45.6	−4.0
Liberal hold		Swing	+4.0	

=== Ivanhoe ===
1973 Victorian state election: Ivanhoe
Party	Candidate	Votes	%	±%
Labor	John Daley	11,401	43.6	−0.4
Liberal	Bruce Skeggs	11,095	42.4	+0.5
Democratic Labor	Kevin Barry	2,127	8.1	−6.0
Australia	Patricia Robinson	1,518	5.8	+5.8
Total formal votes		26,141	97.0	−0.4
Informal votes		799	3.0	+0.4
Turnout		26,940	93.6	−0.3
Two-party-preferred result
Liberal	Bruce Skeggs	13,158	50.3	−4.3
Labor	John Daley	12,983	49.7	+4.3
Liberal hold		Swing	−4.3	

=== Kara Kara ===
1973 Victorian state election: Kara Kara
Party	Candidate	Votes	%	±%
Labor	Esmond Curnow	7,330	44.0	+9.7
Liberal	John Radford	4,691	28.1	+1.0
Country	Roderick Boyd	3,739	22.4	−7.0
Democratic Labor	Robert O'Connor	917	5.5	−3.8
Total formal votes		16,677	98.3	0.0
Informal votes		287	1.7	0.0
Turnout		16,964	96.1	−0.9
Two-party-preferred result
Labor	Esmond Curnow	8,662	51.9	−3.3
Liberal	John Radford	8,015	48.1	+3.3
Labor hold		Swing	−3.3	

=== Kew ===
1973 Victorian state election: Kew
Party	Candidate	Votes	%	±%
Liberal	Rupert Hamer	16,018	64.7	+23.0
Labor	James Hilson	6,603	26.7	+0.9
Democratic Labor	Francis Duffy	2,148	8.7	−5.1
Total formal votes		24,769	98.0	+1.2
Informal votes		494	2.0	−1.2
Turnout		25,263	90.3	−2.7
Two-party-preferred result
Liberal	Rupert Hamer	17,844	72.0	+12.6
Labor	James Hilson	6,925	28.0	−12.6
Liberal hold		Swing	+12.6	

=== Lowan ===
1973 Victorian state election: Lowan
Party	Candidate	Votes	%	±%
Liberal	Jim McCabe	8,220	44.9	+11.0
Labor	Arthur Rowe	4,471	24.5	−2.1
Country	Graeme Smith	3,966	21.7	−10.8
Democratic Labor	Kevin Dunn	843	4.6	−2.4
Independent	Clifford Dodds	785	4.3	+4.3
Total formal votes		18,285	98.3	0.0
Informal votes		309	1.7	0.0
Turnout		18,594	95.4	−1.7
Two-party-preferred result
Liberal	Jim McCabe	13,260	72.5	+3.4
Labor	Arthur Rowe	5,025	27.5	−3.4
Liberal hold		Swing	+3.4	

=== Malvern ===
1973 Victorian state election: Malvern
Party	Candidate	Votes	%	±%
Liberal	Lindsay Thompson	16,219	65.9	+5.3
Labor	Andrew Homer	7,132	29.0	−0.3
Democratic Labor	Edward Preece	1,276	5.2	−4.9
Total formal votes		24,627	97.9	+0.6
Informal votes		519	2.1	−0.6
Turnout		25,146	90.8	+0.2
Two-party-preferred result
Liberal	Lindsay Thompson	17,303	70.3	+1.1
Labor	Andrew Homer	7,324	29.7	−1.1
Liberal hold		Swing	+1.1	

=== Melbourne ===
1973 Victorian state election: Melbourne
Party	Candidate	Votes	%	±%
Labor	Barry Jones	12,582	57.0	−3.5
Liberal	Michael Wallwork	6,244	28.3	+2.6
Democratic Labor	Anna Linard	1,682	7.6	−6.2
Australia	Michele Turner	1,558	7.1	+7.1
Total formal votes		22,066	94.4	+0.2
Informal votes		1,306	5.6	−0.2
Turnout		23,372	87.4	−3.4
Two-party-preferred result
Labor	Barry Jones	13,769	62.4	−0.2
Liberal	Michael Wallwork	8,297	37.6	+0.2
Labor hold		Swing	−0.2	

=== Mentone ===
1973 Victorian state election: Mentone
Party	Candidate	Votes	%	±%
Liberal	Bill Templeton	12,633	46.0	+4.7
Labor	Ian Cathie	12,189	44.4	+0.8
Democratic Labor	Daniel Condon	1,699	6.2	−8.9
Defence of Government Schools	Ian Black	946	3.4	+3.4
Total formal votes		27,467	97.8	+0.1
Informal votes		621	2.2	−0.1
Turnout		28,088	92.7	−1.3
Two-party-preferred result
Liberal	Bill Templeton	14,345	52.2	−3.0
Labor	Ian Cathie	13,122	47.8	+3.0
Liberal hold		Swing	−3.0	

=== Midlands ===
1973 Victorian state election: Midlands
Party	Candidate	Votes	%	±%
Liberal	Bill Ebery	10,959	46.2	+15.1
Labor	Les Shilton	10,851	45.7	+2.7
Democratic Labor	William Mannes	1,933	8.1	−5.0
Total formal votes		23,743	97.9	+0.1
Informal votes		503	2.1	−0.1
Turnout		24,246	94.5	+0.4
Two-party-preferred result
Liberal	Bill Ebery	12,674	53.4	+6.2
Labor	Les Shilton	11,069	46.6	−6.2
Liberal gain from Labor		Swing	+6.2	

=== Mildura ===
1973 Victorian state election: Mildura
Party	Candidate	Votes	%	±%
Country	Milton Whiting	8,536	46.7	+5.9
Labor	Lance Fraser	6,209	34.0	−5.7
Liberal	Kevin Coogan	2,179	11.9	+2.6
Democratic Labor	John Conroy	1,355	7.4	−2.8
Total formal votes		18,279	96.8	+0.3
Informal votes		601	3.2	−0.3
Turnout		18,880	94.3	−0.9
Two-party-preferred result
Country	Milton Whiting	11,753	64.3	+8.7
Labor	Lance Fraser	6,526	35.7	−8.7
Country hold		Swing	+8.7	

=== Mitcham ===
1973 Victorian state election: Mitcham
Party	Candidate	Votes	%	±%
Liberal	Dorothy Goble	14,278	47.3	+7.7
Labor	John Hyslop	12,156	40.3	−1.0
Democratic Labor	Marianne Crowe	1,637	5.4	−6.8
Australia	Ethel Beaumont	1,619	5.4	+5.4
Defence of Government Schools	Ray Nilsen	503	1.7	−5.2
Total formal votes		30,193	97.8	+0.6
Informal votes		692	2.2	−0.6
Turnout		30,885	93.3	−1.5
Two-party-preferred result
Liberal	Dorothy Goble	16,661	55.2	+2.9
Labor	John Hyslop	13,532	44.8	−2.9
Liberal hold		Swing	+2.9	

=== Monbulk ===
1973 Victorian state election: Monbulk
Party	Candidate	Votes	%	±%
Liberal	Bill Borthwick	17,494	51.7	+4.4
Labor	Vernon Allison	13,690	40.5	−1.4
Australia	David Barford	1,431	4.2	+4.2
Democratic Labor	Franciscus Hallewas	1,215	3.6	−7.2
Total formal votes		33,830	97.7	+0.6
Informal votes		788	2.3	−0.6
Turnout		34,618	92.2	−1.9
Two-party-preferred result
Liberal	Bill Borthwick	19,099	56.5	−0.2
Labor	Vernon Allison	14,731	43.5	+0.2
Liberal hold		Swing	−0.2	

=== Moonee Ponds ===
1973 Victorian state election: Moonee Ponds
Party	Candidate	Votes	%	±%
Labor	Tom Edmunds	12,991	54.1	+1.5
Liberal	William Lawrence	8,282	34.5	+2.1
Democratic Labor	Michael McMahon	2,758	11.5	−3.6
Total formal votes		24,031	95.9	−0.2
Informal votes		1,017	4.1	+0.2
Turnout		25,048	94.5	−0.7
Two-party-preferred result
Labor	Tom Edmunds	13,405	55.8	+1.0
Liberal	William Lawrence	10,626	44.2	−1.0
Labor hold		Swing	+1.0	

=== Moorabbin ===
1973 Victorian state election: Moorabbin
Party	Candidate	Votes	%	±%
Liberal	Llew Reese	14,301	51.3	+6.7
Labor	Harry Rourke	11,360	40.7	−0.7
Democratic Labor	Salvatore Pinzone	2,236	8.0	−6.0
Total formal votes		27,897	97.6	+0.2
Informal votes		695	2.4	−0.2
Turnout		28,592	94.0	−1.3
Two-party-preferred result
Liberal	Llew Reese	16,201	58.1	+0.8
Labor	Harry Rourke	11,696	41.9	−0.8
Liberal hold		Swing	+0.8	

=== Morwell ===
1973 Victorian state election: Morwell
Party	Candidate	Votes	%	±%
Labor	Derek Amos	13,611	56.0	+7.0
Liberal	Desmond Bennett	5,988	24.6	−2.4
Country	John Vinall	3,073	12.6	−0.2
Democratic Labor	Leslie Hilton	1,636	6.7	−4.5
Total formal votes		24,308	97.8	+0.3
Informal votes		534	2.2	−0.3
Turnout		24,842	95.0	−0.1
Two-party-preferred result
Labor	Derek Amos	14,163	58.3	+0.4
Liberal	Desmond Bennett	10,145	41.7	−0.4
Labor hold		Swing	+0.4	

=== Murray Valley ===
1973 Victorian state election: Murray Valley
Party	Candidate	Votes	%	±%
Country	Bill Baxter	7,927	40.1	+3.3
Labor	Donald Boag	5,463	27.6	+3.9
Liberal	Robert Crosby	4,808	24.3	−3.2
Democratic Labor	David Kane	1,591	7.9	−4.1
Total formal votes		19,789	97.5	+0.5
Informal votes		496	2.5	−0.5
Turnout		20,285	92.9	−1.6
Two-party-preferred result
Country	Bill Baxter	13,717	69.3	−3.6
Labor	Donald Boag	6,072	30.7	+3.6
Country hold		Swing	−3.6	

=== Narracan ===
1973 Victorian state election: Narracan
Party	Candidate	Votes	%	±%
Liberal	Jim Balfour	9,062	39.8	+3.4
Labor	Wilfred Bartholomeusz	8,992	39.5	+0.7
Country	Alfred Bush	3,163	13.9	+0.1
Democratic Labor	John Mann	1,524	6.7	−4.3
Total formal votes		22,741	98.0	+0.6
Informal votes		472	2.0	−0.6
Turnout		23,213	95.0	−0.4
Two-party-preferred result
Liberal	Jim Balfour	13,320	58.6	+7.8
Labor	Wilfred Bartholomeusz	9,421	41.4	−7.8
Liberal hold		Swing	+7.8	

=== Northcote ===
1973 Victorian state election: Northcote
Party	Candidate	Votes	%	±%
Labor	Frank Wilkes	13,438	58.7	−2.3
Liberal	Michael Galli	6,990	30.6	+30.6
Democratic Labor	Albert Dowsey	2,448	10.7	−28.3
Total formal votes		22,876	95.8	+1.6
Informal votes		1,013	4.2	−1.6
Turnout		23,889	93.4	−0.4
Two-party-preferred result
Labor	Frank Wilkes	13,805	60.3	−0.7
Liberal	Michael Galli	9,071	39.7	+0.7
Labor hold		Swing	−0.7	

=== Oakleigh ===
1973 Victorian state election: Oakleigh
Party	Candidate	Votes	%	±%
Liberal	Alan Scanlan	12,070	49.3	+1.5
Labor	Frank Slater	10,383	42.4	+3.0
Democratic Labor	Ralph Cleary	2,011	8.2	−4.7
Total formal votes		24,464	97.1	+0.3
Informal votes		730	2.9	−0.3
Turnout		25,194	94.0	−0.9
Two-party-preferred result
Liberal	Alan Scanlan	13,885	56.8	−1.8
Labor	Frank Slater	10,579	43.2	+1.8
Liberal hold		Swing	−1.8	

=== Polwarth ===
1973 Victorian state election: Polwarth
Party	Candidate	Votes	%	±%
Liberal	Cec Burgin	10,162	53.7	+13.5
Labor	Bill Pargeter	4,223	22.3	+0.8
Country	John Younis	3,123	16.5	−11.6
Democratic Labor	Michael Dwyer	1,403	7.4	−2.8
Total formal votes		18,911	98.3	+0.2
Informal votes		311	1.7	−0.2
Turnout		19,242	96.4	−0.5
Two-party-preferred result
Liberal	Cec Burgin	14,166	74.9	+24.5
Labor	Bill Pargeter	4,745	25.1	+25.1
Liberal hold		Swing	+24.5	

=== Portland ===
1973 Victorian state election: Portland
Party	Candidate	Votes	%	±%
Labor	Bill Lewis	7,754	41.7	+3.4
Liberal	Don McKellar	7,119	38.3	+6.1
Country	Diana Silvester	2,709	14.6	−6.1
Democratic Labor	Maurice Purcell	1,004	5.4	−3.3
Total formal votes		18,586	98.2	−0.3
Informal votes		333	1.8	+0.3
Turnout		18,919	95.6	−1.1
Two-party-preferred result
Liberal	Don McKellar	10,245	54.6	+7.4
Labor	Bill Lewis	8,341	45.4	−7.4
Liberal gain from Labor		Swing	+7.4	

=== Prahran ===
1973 Victorian state election: Prahran
Party	Candidate	Votes	%	±%
Liberal	Sam Loxton	11,306	48.1	+6.0
Labor	Murray Pearce	10,305	43.9	+4.1
Democratic Labor	John Johnston	1,891	8.1	−0.5
Total formal votes		23,502	96.7	+1.5
Informal votes		795	3.3	−1.5
Turnout		24,297	87.7	−1.0
Two-party-preferred result
Liberal	Sam Loxton	12,955	55.1	+0.1
Labor	Murray Pearce	10,547	44.9	−0.1
Liberal hold		Swing	+0.1	

=== Preston ===
1973 Victorian state election: Preston
Party	Candidate	Votes	%	±%
Labor	Carl Kirkwood	12,456	54.7	+0.2
Liberal	Gerard Clarke	7,728	33.9	+6.0
Democratic Labor	Maurice Horwood	1,786	7.8	−9.7
Independent	Timothy Galbally	814	3.6	+3.6
Total formal votes		22,784	95.2	−0.1
Informal votes		1,138	4.8	+0.1
Turnout		23,922	93.1	−1.6
Two-party-preferred result
Labor	Carl Kirkwood	13,130	57.6	+0.5
Liberal	Gerard Clarke	9,654	42.4	−0.5
Labor hold		Swing	+0.5	

=== Reservoir ===
1973 Victorian state election: Reservoir
Party	Candidate	Votes	%	±%
Labor	Jim Simmonds	15,856	56.8	+1.5
Liberal	Elizabeth McDonnell	8,388	30.0	+3.8
Democratic Labor	Joseph Fitzgerald	3,690	13.2	−5.2
Total formal votes		27,934	95.8	−0.1
Informal votes		1,231	4.2	+0.1
Turnout		29,165	94.1	−1.8
Two-party-preferred result
Labor	Jim Simmonds	16,410	58.7	+0.7
Liberal	Elizabeth McDonnell	11,524	41.3	−0.7
Labor hold		Swing	+0.7	

=== Richmond ===
1973 Victorian state election: Richmond
Party	Candidate	Votes	%	±%
Labor	Clyde Holding	11,612	64.4	+0.6
Liberal	Roger Frankel	4,001	22.2	+4.6
Democratic Labor	Henry Bader	2,426	13.4	−0.5
Total formal votes		18,039	94.1	+1.2
Informal votes		1,137	5.9	−1.2
Turnout		19,176	87.7	−4.2
Two-party-preferred result
Labor	Clyde Holding	11,976	66.4	−1.9
Liberal	Roger Frankel	6,063	33.6	+1.9
Labor hold		Swing	−1.9	

=== Ringwood ===
1973 Victorian state election: Ringwood
Party	Candidate	Votes	%	±%
Liberal	Norman Lacy	18,965	51.0	+3.7
Labor	Peter Fuller	13,739	36.9	−4.7
Australia	Dulcie Bethune	2,649	7.1	+7.1
Democratic Labor	Antonio De Sousa	1,840	5.0	−6.2
Total formal votes		37,193	98.2	+0.4
Informal votes		687	1.8	−0.4
Turnout		37,880	93.0	−2.2
Two-party-preferred result
Liberal	Norman Lacy	21,589	58.1	+1.3
Labor	Peter Fuller	15,604	41.9	−1.3
Liberal hold		Swing	+1.3	

=== Rodney ===
1973 Victorian state election: Rodney
Party	Candidate	Votes	%	±%
Country	Eddie Hann	10,800	55.3	+5.6
Labor	Alan Williams	3,919	20.1	−0.3
Liberal	James Nelms	2,831	14.5	−4.4
Democratic Labor	John Evans	1,995	10.2	−0.9
Total formal votes		19,545	97.8	+0.5
Informal votes		448	2.2	−0.5
Turnout		19,993	94.6	−1.9
Two-party-preferred result
Country	Eddie Hann	15,044	77.0	+0.8
Labor	Alan Williams	4,501	23.0	−0.8
Country hold		Swing	+0.8	

=== St Kilda ===
1973 Victorian state election: St Kilda
Party	Candidate	Votes	%	±%
Liberal	Brian Dixon	11,974	50.4	+4.4
Labor	Robin Beaumont	9,627	40.5	+0.2
Democratic Labor	John Hughes	1,220	5.1	−4.4
Australia	Beverley Broadbent	957	4.0	+4.0
Total formal votes		23,778	96.1	+1.1
Informal votes		975	3.9	−1.1
Turnout		24,753	89.6	−2.0
Two-party-preferred result
Liberal	Brian Dixon	13,394	56.3	+0.4
Labor	Robin Beaumont	10,384	43.7	−0.4
Liberal hold		Swing	+0.4	

=== Sandringham ===
1973 Victorian state election: Sandringham
Party	Candidate	Votes	%	±%
Liberal	Max Crellin	14,871	58.3	+7.2
Labor	Margaret Graham	9,310	36.5	−1.8
Democratic Labor	William Leech	1,325	5.2	−5.5
Total formal votes		25,506	98.4	+0.3
Informal votes		403	1.6	−0.3
Turnout		25,909	92.5	−1.6
Two-party-preferred result
Liberal	Max Crellin	15,998	62.7	+1.6
Labor	Margaret Graham	9,508	37.3	−1.6
Liberal hold		Swing	+1.6	

=== Scoresby ===
1973 Victorian state election: Scoresby
Party	Candidate	Votes	%	±%
Liberal	Geoff Hayes	27,562	49.6	+7.3
Labor	Alan West	21,431	38.6	−3.8
Australia	Murray Deerbon	3,513	6.3	+6.3
Democratic Labor	Michael McMahon	3,003	5.4	−9.9
Total formal votes		55,509	97.6	+0.1
Informal votes		1,337	2.4	−0.1
Turnout		56,846	94.0	−1.3
Two-party-preferred result
Liberal	Geoff Hayes	31,767	57.2	+1.1
Labor	Alan West	23,742	42.8	−1.1
Liberal hold		Swing	+1.1	

=== Shepparton ===
1973 Victorian state election: Shepparton
Party	Candidate	Votes	%	±%
Country	Peter Ross-Edwards	9,468	44.5	+2.9
Liberal	Bill Hunter	4,975	23.4	+12.6
Labor	Patrick Golden	4,925	23.2	+5.1
Democratic Labor	Arthur Garner	1,896	8.9	−1.2
Total formal votes		21,264	97.0	+1.2
Informal votes		658	3.0	−1.2
Turnout		21,922	95.6	−0.6
Two-party-preferred result
Country	Peter Ross-Edwards	15,422	72.6	−0.4
Labor	Patrick Golden	5,842	27.4	+0.4
Country hold		Swing	−0.4	

=== Sunshine ===
1973 Victorian state election: Sunshine
Party	Candidate	Votes	%	±%
Labor	Bill Fogarty	15,362	62.1	+1.3
Liberal	Ian Ryan	6,311	25.5	+2.9
Democratic Labor	Mary Barnes	3,065	12.4	−4.2
Total formal votes		24,738	95.5	+0.6
Informal votes		1,177	4.5	−0.6
Turnout		25,915	93.7	−2.1
Two-party-preferred result
Labor	Bill Fogarty	15,821	64.0	+0.7
Liberal	Ian Ryan	8,917	36.0	−0.7
Labor hold		Swing	+0.7	

=== Swan Hill ===
1973 Victorian state election: Swan Hill
Party	Candidate	Votes	%	±%
Country	Henry Broad	7,148	38.9	−1.0
Liberal	Alan Wood	5,965	32.5	+12.1
Labor	Patricia Fraser	3,958	21.5	−4.9
Democratic Labor	Rodger Donohue	1,305	7.1	−6.2
Total formal votes		18,376	97.6	+0.4
Informal votes		453	2.4	−0.4
Turnout		18,829	95.1	−0.7
Two-candidate-preferred result
Liberal	Alan Wood	9,421	51.3	+51.3
Country	Henry Broad	8,955	48.7	−21.6
Liberal gain from Country		Swing	N/A	

=== Syndal ===
1973 Victorian state election: Syndal
Party	Candidate	Votes	%	±%
Liberal	Ray Wiltshire	20,029	52.3	+5.6
Labor	Christopher Miller	13,386	35.0	−3.5
Democratic Labor	Daniel McCabe	2,724	7.2	−7.6
Australia	Kenneth Mylius	2,135	5.6	+5.6
Total formal votes		38,292	97.9	+0.1
Informal votes		801	2.1	−0.1
Turnout		39,093	94.4	−1.3
Two-party-preferred result
Liberal	Ray Wiltshire	23,217	60.6	+2.2
Labor	Christopher Miller	15,075	39.4	−2.2
Liberal hold		Swing	+2.2	

=== Warrnambool ===
1973 Victorian state election: Warrnambool
Party	Candidate	Votes	%	±%
Liberal	Ian Smith	8,796	43.7	+7.0
Labor	Ken Sanders	5,702	28.4	−0.2
Country	Harold Stephenson	3,033	15.1	+3.3
Democratic Labor	Francis Hasell	2,583	12.8	−6.2
Total formal votes		20,114	98.4	+0.2
Informal votes		320	1.6	−0.2
Turnout		20,434	96.3	−0.4
Two-party-preferred result
Liberal	Ian Smith	13,815	68.7	+9.9
Labor	Ken Sanders	6,299	31.7	−9.9
Liberal hold		Swing	+9.9	

=== Williamstown ===
1973 Victorian state election: Williamstown
Party	Candidate	Votes	%	±%
Labor	Gordon Stirling	16,744	59.8	−4.0
Liberal	John Coughlin	9,090	32.5	+9.5
Democratic Labor	Norman Way	2,146	7.7	−5.5
Total formal votes		27,980	95.4	−0.4
Informal votes		1,362	4.6	+0.4
Turnout		29,342	94.5	−0.1
Two-party-preferred result
Labor	Gordon Stirling	17,066	61.0	−4.8
Liberal	John Coughlin	10,914	39.0	+4.8
Labor hold		Swing	−4.8	

== See also ==
- 1973 Victorian state election
- Members of the Victorian Legislative Assembly, 1973–1976
