= Results of the 1970 Victorian state election (Legislative Assembly) =

Australian state election results

Victorian state election, 30 May 1970 Legislative Assembly << 1967–1973 >>
| Enrolled voters | 1,827,595 | | | | |
| Votes cast | 1,728,363 | | Turnout | 94.57 | +0.3 |
| Informal votes | 55,141 | | Informal | 3.19 | +0.03 |
Summary of votes by party
| Party | Primary votes | % | Swing | Seats | Change |
| Labor | 693,105 | 41.42 | +3.52 | 22 | +6 |
| Liberal | 614,094 | 36.70 | -0.79 | 42 | -2 |
| Democratic Labor | 222,591 | 13.30 | -0.99 | 0 | ±0 |
| Country | 107,011 | 6.40 | -2.25 | 8 | -4 |
| Independent | 28,758 | 1.72 | +0.14 | 1 | ±0 |
| Other | 7,663 | 0.46 | +0.37 | 0 | ±0 |
| Total | 1,673,222 | | | 73 | |
Two-party-preferred
| Liberal | 905,987 | 54.2 | –4.2 | | |
| Labor | 767,055 | 45.8 | +4.2 | | |

This is a list of electoral district results for the Victorian 1970 election.

== Results by electoral district ==
=== Albert Park ===
1970 Victorian state election: Albert Park
| Party | Candidate | Votes | % | ±% |
|---|---|---|---|---|
| Labor | Val Doube | 11,583 | 57.8 | −2.1 |
| Liberal | Wallace Cameron | 5,768 | 28.8 | +5.9 |
| Democratic Labor | Monica McGeoch | 2,692 | 13.4 | −3.8 |
| Total formal votes | | 20,043 | 95.4 | +0.1 |
| Informal votes | | 960 | 4.6 | −0.1 |
| Turnout | | 21,003 | 92.4 | +0.2 |
Two-party-preferred result
| Labor | Val Doube | 11,987 | 59.8 | −2.7 |
| Liberal | Wallace Cameron | 8,056 | 40.2 | +2.7 |
| Labor hold | | Swing | −2.7 | |

=== Ballarat North ===
1970 Victorian state election: Ballarat North
| Party | Candidate | Votes | % | ±% |
|---|---|---|---|---|
| Liberal | Tom Evans | 11,266 | 49.5 | −0.6 |
| Labor | Kevin Flynn | 7,971 | 35.0 | +2.1 |
| Democratic Labor | Walter Brown | 3,522 | 15.5 | −0.6 |
| Total formal votes | | 22,759 | 98.1 | −0.0 |
| Informal votes | | 447 | 1.9 | +0.0 |
| Turnout | | 23,206 | 96.1 | −0.5 |
Two-party-preferred result
| Liberal | Tom Evans | 14,350 | 63.8 | −0.7 |
| Labor | Kevin Flynn | 8,229 | 36.2 | +0.7 |
| Liberal hold | | Swing | −0.7 | |

=== Ballarat South ===
1970 Victorian state election: Ballarat South
| Party | Candidate | Votes | % | ±% |
|---|---|---|---|---|
| Liberal | Bill Stephen | 9,530 | 44.2 | +0.7 |
| Labor | Tom Cullen | 8,467 | 39.3 | +0.1 |
| Democratic Labor | Francis Brown | 3,563 | 16.5 | −0.8 |
| Total formal votes | | 21,560 | 97.6 | +0.3 |
| Informal votes | | 525 | 2.4 | −0.3 |
| Turnout | | 22,085 | 95.7 | +0.0 |
Two-party-preferred result
| Liberal | Bill Stephen | 12,094 | 56.1 | +0.3 |
| Labor | Tom Cullen | 9,466 | 43.9 | −0.3 |

=== Balwyn ===
1970 Victorian state election: Balwyn
| Party | Candidate | Votes | % | ±% |
|---|---|---|---|---|
| Liberal | Alex Taylor | 13,528 | 54.5 | −3.5 |
| Labor | Donald Phelan | 7,972 | 32.1 | +2.1 |
| Democratic Labor | John Hansen | 3,310 | 13.3 | +1.3 |
| Total formal votes | | 25,326 | 98.0 | 0.0 |
| Informal votes | | 516 | 2.0 | 0.0 |
| Turnout | | 25,326 | 93.4 | 0.0 |
Two-party-preferred result
| Liberal | Alex Taylor | 16,342 | 65.9 | −2.3 |
| Labor | Donald Phelan | 8,468 | 34.1 | +2.3 |
| Liberal hold | | Swing | −2.3 | |

=== Bellarine ===
1970 Victorian state election: Bellarine
| Party | Candidate | Votes | % | ±% |
|---|---|---|---|---|
| Liberal | Aurel Smith | 10,682 | 46.5 | −4.1 |
| Labor | Francis Brady | 9,547 | 41.6 | +4.5 |
| Democratic Labor | James Crockett | 2,740 | 11.9 | −0.4 |
| Total formal votes | | 22,969 | 98.1 | +0.2 |
| Informal votes | | 439 | 1.9 | −0.2 |
| Turnout | | 23,408 | 95.6 | +0.9 |
Two-party-preferred result
| Liberal | Aurel Smith | 12,999 | 56.6 | −3.5 |
| Labor | Francis Brady | 9,466 | 43.4 | +3.5 |
| Liberal hold | | Swing | −3.5 | |

=== Benalla ===
1970 Victorian state election: Benalla
| Party | Candidate | Votes | % | ±% |
|---|---|---|---|---|
| Country | Tom Trewin | 7,981 | 46.1 | −6.0 |
| Labor | John Coutts | 3,762 | 21.8 | +2.9 |
| Liberal | Dulcie Brack | 3,503 | 20.2 | +3.0 |
| Democratic Labor | Christopher Cody | 2,053 | 11.9 | +0.1 |
| Total formal votes | | 17,299 | 97.5 | −0.1 |
| Informal votes | | 438 | 2.5 | +0.1 |
| Turnout | | 17,737 | 95.9 | −0.2 |
Two-party-preferred result
| Country | Tom Trewin | 13,043 | 75.4 | −2.2 |
| Labor | John Coutts | 4,256 | 24.6 | +2.2 |
Two-candidate-preferred result
| Country | Tom Trewin | 9,399 | 54.3 | −23.3 |
| Liberal | Dulcie Brack | 7,900 | 45.7 | +45.7 |
| Country hold | | Swing | −2.2 | |

=== Benambra ===
1970 Victorian state election: Benambra
| Party | Candidate | Votes | % | ±% |
|---|---|---|---|---|
| Country | Tom Mitchell | 8,233 | 47.3 | −7.4 |
| Labor | Edwin Ure | 4,365 | 25.1 | +5.0 |
| Liberal | Robert Prior | 1,849 | 10.6 | −2.0 |
| Democratic Labor | Francis Keenan | 1,803 | 10.4 | −2.2 |
| Independent | John Hicks | 1,164 | 6.7 | +6.7 |
| Total formal votes | | 17,414 | 96.3 | −1.1 |
| Informal votes | | 663 | 3.7 | +1.1 |
| Turnout | | 18,077 | 95.1 | −0.3 |
Two-party-preferred result
| Country | Tom Mitchell | 12,334 | 70.8 | −6.0 |
| Labor | Edwin Ure | 5,080 | 29.2 | +6.0 |
| Country hold | | Swing | −6.0 | |

=== Bendigo ===
1970 Victorian state election: Bendigo
| Party | Candidate | Votes | % | ±% |
|---|---|---|---|---|
| Labor | Kevin Curran | 9,991 | 44.6 | +4.3 |
| Liberal | Robert Trethewey | 8,960 | 40.0 | +7.9 |
| Democratic Labor | Paul Brennan | 3,435 | 15.3 | +0.5 |
| Total formal votes | | 22,386 | 98.4 | +0.6 |
| Informal votes | | 360 | 1.6 | −0.6 |
| Turnout | | 22,746 | 95.9 | +0.1 |
Two-party-preferred result
| Liberal | Robert Trethewey | 11,740 | 52.4 | +1.7 |
| Labor | Kevin Curran | 10,646 | 47.6 | −1.7 |
| Liberal hold | | Swing | +1.7 | |

=== Bennettswood ===
1970 Victorian state election: Bennettswood
| Party | Candidate | Votes | % | ±% |
|---|---|---|---|---|
| Liberal | Ian McLaren | 11,463 | 44.7 | −3.7 |
| Labor | Cyril Kennedy | 11,225 | 43.8 | +4.9 |
| Democratic Labor | James Tighe | 2,946 | 11.5 | −1.2 |
| Total formal votes | | 25,634 | 98.0 | +0.3 |
| Informal votes | | 530 | 2.0 | −0.3 |
| Turnout | | 26,164 | 95.3 | +0.2 |
Two-party-preferred result
| Liberal | Ian McLaren | 14,152 | 55.2 | −4.9 |
| Labor | Cyril Kennedy | 11,482 | 44.8 | +4.9 |
| Liberal hold | | Swing | −4.9 | |

=== Bentleigh ===
1970 Victorian state election: Bentleigh
| Party | Candidate | Votes | % | ±% |
|---|---|---|---|---|
| Liberal | Bob Suggett | 10,689 | 43.4 | +5.4 |
| Labor | Kenneth Williams | 9,311 | 37.8 | +4.3 |
| Democratic Labor | Peter Madden | 2,655 | 10.8 | +0.1 |
| Independent | Noel Allen | 1,237 | 5.0 | +5.0 |
| Independent | Mary Ovenden | 719 | 2.9 | +2.9 |
| Total formal votes | | 24,611 | 96.7 | −0.9 |
| Informal votes | | 838 | 3.3 | +0.9 |
| Turnout | | 25,449 | 95.5 | +0.6 |
Two-party-preferred result
| Liberal | Bob Suggett | 14,452 | 58.7 | −3.5 |
| Labor | Kenneth Williams | 10,159 | 41.3 | +3.5 |
| Liberal hold | | Swing | −3.5 | |

=== Box Hill ===
1970 Victorian state election: Box Hill
| Party | Candidate | Votes | % | ±% |
|---|---|---|---|---|
| Liberal | George Reid | 15,356 | 45.6 | −3.3 |
| Labor | Maurice Sevior | 12,451 | 37.0 | +4.7 |
| Democratic Labor | James Marmion | 4,482 | 13.3 | −2.3 |
| Independent | John Clarkson | 1,365 | 4.1 | +4.1 |
| Total formal votes | | 32,792 | 97.5 | −0.2 |
| Informal votes | | 862 | 2.5 | +0.2 |
| Turnout | | 33,654 | 95.3 | +0.7 |
Two-party-preferred result
| Liberal | George Reid | 20,521 | 61.0 | −3.5 |
| Labor | Maurice Sevior | 12,271 | 39.0 | +3.5 |
| Liberal hold | | Swing | −3.5 | |

=== Brighton ===
1970 Victorian state election: Brighton
| Party | Candidate | Votes | % | ±% |
|---|---|---|---|---|
| Liberal | John Rossiter | 9,812 | 43.7 | −16.3 |
| Labor | Peter Hansen | 7,048 | 31.4 | +4.6 |
| Independent | Malcolm Wallace-Mitchell | 3,562 | 15.8 | +15.8 |
| Democratic Labor | Keith Linard | 2,053 | 9.1 | −4.0 |
| Total formal votes | | 22,475 | 97.8 | +0.3 |
| Informal votes | | 516 | 2.2 | −0.3 |
| Turnout | | 22,991 | 93.0 | −0.4 |
Two-party-preferred result
| Liberal | John Rossiter | 14,742 | 65.6 | −5.6 |
| Labor | Peter Hansen | 7,733 | 34.4 | +5.6 |
| Liberal hold | | Swing | −5.6 | |

=== Broadmeadows ===
1970 Victorian state election: Broadmeadows
| Party | Candidate | Votes | % | ±% |
|---|---|---|---|---|
| Labor | John Wilton | 18,270 | 58.0 | +2.9 |
| Liberal | Howard Thain | 6,884 | 21.9 | −4.5 |
| Democratic Labor | Francis Dowling | 6,332 | 20.1 | +1.6 |
| Total formal votes | | 31,486 | 94.8 | −1.1 |
| Informal votes | | 1,742 | 5.2 | +1.1 |
| Turnout | | 33,228 | 95.6 | +2.4 |
Two-party-preferred result
| Labor | John Wilton | 19,220 | 61.0 | +3.1 |
| Liberal | Howard Thain | 12,266 | 39.0 | −3.1 |
| Labor hold | | Swing | +3.1 | |

=== Brunswick East ===
1970 Victorian state election: Brunswick East
| Party | Candidate | Votes | % | ±% |
|---|---|---|---|---|
| Labor | David Bornstein | 12,384 | 60.5 | +5.0 |
| Liberal | James Guest | 5,151 | 25.1 | +1.4 |
| Democratic Labor | Anthony Staunton | 2,949 | 14.4 | +0.3 |
| Total formal votes | | 20,484 | 93.3 | +1.0 |
| Informal votes | | 1,463 | 6.7 | −1.0 |
| Turnout | | 21,947 | 92.4 | −0.3 |
Two-party-preferred result
| Labor | David Bornstein | 12,826 | 62.6 | +1.6 |
| Liberal | James Guest | 7,658 | 37.4 | −1.6 |
| Labor hold | | Swing | +1.6 | |

=== Brunswick West ===
1970 Victorian state election: Brunswick West
| Party | Candidate | Votes | % | ±% |
|---|---|---|---|---|
| Labor | Campbell Turnbull | 10,737 | 51.2 | +1.6 |
| Liberal | Walter Dale | 7,099 | 33.8 | +2.6 |
| Democratic Labor | John Flint | 3,153 | 15.0 | −4.2 |
| Total formal votes | | 20,989 | 95.8 | 0.0 |
| Informal votes | | 912 | 4.2 | 0.0 |
| Turnout | | 21,901 | 95.0 | +0.8 |
Two-party-preferred result
| Labor | Campbell Turnbull | 11,209 | 53.4 | +2.2 |
| Liberal | Walter Dale | 9,780 | 46.6 | −2.2 |
| Labor hold | | Swing | +2.2 | |

=== Camberwell ===
1970 Victorian state election: Camberwell
| Party | Candidate | Votes | % | ±% |
|---|---|---|---|---|
| Liberal | Vernon Wilcox | 12,159 | 54.1 | −5.6 |
| Labor | Allan McDonald | 7,392 | 32.9 | +6.7 |
| Democratic Labor | Joseph Stanley | 2,901 | 12.9 | −1.2 |
| Total formal votes | | 22,452 | 97.8 | +0.2 |
| Informal votes | | 496 | 2.2 | −0.2 |
| Turnout | | 22,948 | 92.8 | 0.0 |
Two-party-preferred result
| Liberal | Vernon Wilcox | 14,625 | 65.1 | −6.6 |
| Labor | Allan McDonald | 7,827 | 34.9 | +6.6 |
| Liberal hold | | Swing | −6.6 | |

=== Caulfield ===
1970 Victorian state election: Caulfield
| Party | Candidate | Votes | % | ±% |
|---|---|---|---|---|
| Liberal | Edgar Tanner | 11,334 | 48.4 | −2.5 |
| Labor | George Papadopoulos | 7,394 | 31.6 | −2.3 |
| Democratic Labor | Peter Grant | 2,872 | 12.3 | −2.9 |
| Independent | Evelyn Janover | 1,827 | 7.8 | +7.8 |
| Total formal votes | | 23,427 | 95.9 | −0.5 |
| Informal votes | | 1,006 | 4.1 | +0.5 |
| Turnout | | 24,433 | 91.5 | −0.4 |
Two-party-preferred result
| Liberal | Edgar Tanner | 14,738 | 62.9 | −0.9 |
| Labor | George Papadopoulos | 8,689 | 37.1 | +0.9 |
| Liberal hold | | Swing | −0.9 | |

=== Coburg ===
1970 Victorian state election: Coburg
| Party | Candidate | Votes | % | ±% |
|---|---|---|---|---|
| Labor | Frank Cox | 8,236 | 38.8 | −1.0 |
| Independent | Jack Mutton | 5,728 | 27.3 | +6.4 |
| Liberal | Joan Mathieson | 4,627 | 21.8 | −2.8 |
| Democratic Labor | Peter McCabe | 2,616 | 12.3 | −2.5 |
| Total formal votes | | 21,207 | 95.8 | +0.1 |
| Informal votes | | 931 | 4.2 | −0.1 |
| Turnout | | 22,138 | 95.1 | −0.4 |
Two-candidate-preferred result
| Independent | Jack Mutton | 12,480 | 58.8 | +0.4 |
| Labor | Frank Cox | 8,727 | 41.2 | −0.4 |
| Independent hold | | Swing | +0.4 | |

=== Dandenong ===
1970 Victorian state election: Dandenong
| Party | Candidate | Votes | % | ±% |
|---|---|---|---|---|
| Labor | Alan Lind | 15,627 | 51.4 | +8.4 |
| Liberal | Wallace Werrett | 10,706 | 35.2 | −6.4 |
| Democratic Labor | Kevin Leydon | 4,102 | 13.5 | −1.8 |
| Total formal votes | | 30,435 | 96.9 | 0.0 |
| Informal votes | | 983 | 3.1 | 0.0 |
| Turnout | | 31,418 | 95.8 | +0.3 |
Two-party-preferred result
| Labor | Alan Lind | 16,242 | 53.4 | +6.6 |
| Liberal | Wallace Werrett | 14,193 | 46.6 | −6.6 |
| Labor gain from Liberal | | Swing | +6.6 | |

=== Deer Park ===
1970 Victorian state election: Deer Park
| Party | Candidate | Votes | % | ±% |
|---|---|---|---|---|
| Labor | Jack Ginifer | 18,115 | 54.7 | +1.5 |
| Liberal | Douglas Reinehr | 8,800 | 26.6 | +0.1 |
| Democratic Labor | John Cate | 6,219 | 18.7 | −0.1 |
| Total formal votes | | 33,134 | 93.4 | −1.1 |
| Informal votes | | 2,355 | 6.6 | +1.1 |
| Turnout | | 35,489 | 95.7 | +1.0 |
Two-party-preferred result
| Labor | Jack Ginifer | 19,048 | 57.5 | +0.7 |
| Liberal | Douglas Reinehr | 14,086 | 42.5 | −0.7 |
| Labor hold | | Swing | +0.7 | |

=== Dromana ===
1970 Victorian state election: Dromana
| Party | Candidate | Votes | % | ±% |
|---|---|---|---|---|
| Liberal | Roberts Dunstan | 11,520 | 54.5 | −0.8 |
| Labor | Neil McIntosh | 7,239 | 34.3 | +4.7 |
| Democratic Labor | Josephus Gobel | 2,369 | 11.2 | +1.7 |
| Total formal votes | | 21,128 | 97.8 | −0.1 |
| Informal votes | | 484 | 2.2 | +0.1 |
| Turnout | | 21,612 | 93.9 | −0.2 |
Two-party-preferred result
| Liberal | Roberts Dunstan | 13,534 | 64.1 | −4.3 |
| Labor | Neil McIntosh | 7,594 | 35.9 | +4.3 |
| Liberal hold | | Swing | −4.3 | |

=== Dundas ===
1970 Victorian state election: Dundas
| Party | Candidate | Votes | % | ±% |
|---|---|---|---|---|
| Labor | Edward Lewis | 5,884 | 34.2 | −0.5 |
| Liberal | William McDonald | 5,145 | 29.9 | −3.0 |
| Country | Alexander McLennan | 3,530 | 20.5 | −2.0 |
| Democratic Labor | James Eveston | 1,424 | 8.3 | −1.7 |
| Defence of Government Schools | Alma Crouch | 1,045 | 6.1 | +6.1 |
| Independent | John Moodie | 159 | 0.9 | +0.9 |
| Total formal votes | | 17,187 | 96.4 | −1.8 |
| Informal votes | | 641 | 3.6 | +1.8 |
| Turnout | | 17,828 | 96.7 | +0.1 |
Two-party-preferred result
| Labor | Edward Lewis | 9,211 | 53.6 | +5.6 |
| Liberal | William McDonald | 7,976 | 46.4 | −5.6 |
| Labor gain from Liberal | | Swing | +5.6 | |

=== Essendon ===
1970 Victorian state election: Essendon
| Party | Candidate | Votes | % | ±% |
|---|---|---|---|---|
| Labor | Ronald Kennelly | 11,137 | 45.7 | +4.5 |
| Liberal | Kenneth Wheeler | 9,125 | 37.4 | −2.1 |
| Democratic Labor | Kevin Digby | 4,103 | 16.8 | −1.7 |
| Total formal votes | | 24,365 | 96.8 | −1.4 |
| Informal votes | | 815 | 3.2 | +1.4 |
| Turnout | | 25,180 | 95.4 | −1.2 |
Two-party-preferred result
| Liberal | Kenneth Wheeler | 12,342 | 50.7 | −4.7 |
| Labor | Ronald Kennelly | 12,023 | 49.3 | +4.7 |
| Liberal hold | | Swing | −4.7 | |

=== Evelyn ===
1970 Victorian state election: Evelyn
| Party | Candidate | Votes | % | ±% |
|---|---|---|---|---|
| Liberal | Russell Stokes | 8,711 | 44.6 | +2.9 |
| Labor | Raymond Donkin | 8,414 | 43.1 | +9.4 |
| Democratic Labor | Alfred Gerrard | 1,643 | 8.4 | −0.7 |
| Independent | Maurice Smith | 766 | 3.9 | +3.9 |
| Total formal votes | | 19,534 | 97.4 | +0.7 |
| Informal votes | | 528 | 2.6 | −0.7 |
| Turnout | | 20,062 | 94.6 | +0.7 |
Two-party-preferred result
| Liberal | Russell Stokes | 10,526 | 53.9 | −6.9 |
| Labor | Raymond Donkin | 9,008 | 46.1 | +6.9 |
| Liberal hold | | Swing | −6.9 | |

=== Footscray ===
1970 Victorian state election: Footscray
| Party | Candidate | Votes | % | ±% |
|---|---|---|---|---|
| Labor | Robert Fordham | 13,517 | 61.4 | −2.8 |
| Liberal | Claus Brumm | 5,782 | 26.3 | +8.7 |
| Democratic Labor | Robin Thomas | 2,706 | 12.3 | −5.9 |
| Total formal votes | | 22,005 | 94.7 | −0.5 |
| Informal votes | | 1,231 | 5.3 | +0.5 |
| Turnout | | 23,236 | 95.0 | +0.2 |
Two-party-preferred result
| Labor | Robert Fordham | 13,923 | 63.3 | −4.6 |
| Liberal | Claus Brumm | 8,082 | 36.7 | +4.6 |
| Labor hold | | Swing | −4.6 | |

=== Frankston ===
1970 Victorian state election: Frankston
| Party | Candidate | Votes | % | ±% |
|---|---|---|---|---|
| Liberal | Edward Meagher | 16,191 | 48.0 | −2.1 |
| Labor | Mervyn Vogt | 13,198 | 39.1 | +0.6 |
| Democratic Labor | John Glynn | 4,367 | 12.9 | +1.4 |
| Total formal votes | | 33,756 | 97.6 | +0.2 |
| Informal votes | | 845 | 2.4 | −0.2 |
| Turnout | | 34,601 | 94.0 | −0.4 |
Two-party-preferred result
| Liberal | Edward Meagher | 20,096 | 59.5 | −0.3 |
| Labor | Mervyn Vogt | 13,660 | 40.5 | +0.3 |
| Liberal hold | | Swing | −0.3 | |

=== Geelong ===
1970 Victorian state election: Geelong
| Party | Candidate | Votes | % | ±% |
|---|---|---|---|---|
| Liberal | Hayden Birrell | 9,823 | 45.8 | −2.5 |
| Labor | John Woolfe | 8,741 | 40.8 | +2.4 |
| Democratic Labor | John Timberlake | 2,884 | 13.4 | +0.1 |
| Total formal votes | | 21,448 | 97.9 | +0.2 |
| Informal votes | | 468 | 2.1 | −0.2 |
| Turnout | | 21,916 | 95.1 | +1.0 |
Two-party-preferred result
| Liberal | Hayden Birrell | 12,439 | 58.0 | −1.6 |
| Labor | John Woolfe | 9,009 | 42.0 | +1.6 |
| Liberal hold | | Swing | −1.6 | |

=== Geelong North ===
1970 Victorian state election: Geelong North
| Party | Candidate | Votes | % | ±% |
|---|---|---|---|---|
| Labor | Neil Trezise | 13,939 | 59.7 | +0.6 |
| Liberal | Graeme Hawkins | 6,678 | 28.6 | +0.4 |
| Democratic Labor | James Jordan | 2,725 | 11.7 | −1.0 |
| Total formal votes | | 22,703 | 97.3 | +0.2 |
| Informal votes | | 639 | 2.7 | −0.2 |
| Turnout | | 23,342 | 95.1 | +0.8 |
Two-party-preferred result
| Labor | Neil Trezise | 14,348 | 61.5 | +0.5 |
| Liberal | Graeme Hawkins | 8,994 | 38.5 | −0.5 |
| Labor hold | | Swing | +0.5 | |

=== Gippsland East ===
1970 Victorian state election: Gippsland East
| Party | Candidate | Votes | % | ±% |
|---|---|---|---|---|
| Country | Bruce Evans | 6,570 | 36.9 | −13.2 |
| Labor | Philip Grech | 4,628 | 26.0 | +4.5 |
| Liberal | Keith Mason | 4,367 | 24.5 | +9.4 |
| Democratic Labor | Frank Burns | 2,226 | 12.5 | −0.7 |
| Total formal votes | | 17,791 | 97.3 | −0.3 |
| Informal votes | | 498 | 2.7 | +0.3 |
| Turnout | | 18,289 | 94.4 | +0.3 |
Two-party-preferred result
| Country | Bruce Evans | 12,601 | 70.8 | −4.2 |
| Labor | Philip Grech | 5,190 | 29.2 | +4.2 |
Two-candidate-preferred result
| Country | Bruce Evans | 11,579 | 65.1 | −9.9 |
| Liberal | Keith Mason | 6,212 | 34.9 | +9.9 |
| Country hold | | Swing | −9.9 | |

=== Gippsland South ===
1970 Victorian state election: Gippsland South
| Party | Candidate | Votes | % | ±% |
|---|---|---|---|---|
| Country | John Vinall | 6,886 | 37.7 | −19.6 |
| Liberal | James Taylor | 4,944 | 27.1 | +14.8 |
| Labor | Thomas Matthews | 4,160 | 22.8 | +4.7 |
| Democratic Labor | John Condon | 2,252 | 12.4 | +1.3 |
| Total formal votes | | 18,242 | 97.7 | +1.1 |
| Informal votes | | 437 | 2.3 | −1.1 |
| Turnout | | 18,679 | 94.5 | +1.1 |
Two-party-preferred result
| Liberal | James Taylor | 12,904 | 70.7 | −7.7 |
| Labor | Thomas Matthews | 5,338 | 29.3 | +7.7 |
Two-candidate-preferred result
| Liberal | James Taylor | 10,273 | 56.3 | +56.3 |
| Country | John Vinall | 7,969 | 43.7 | −34.7 |
| Liberal gain from Country | | Swing | N/A | |

=== Gippsland West ===
1970 Victorian state election: Gippsland West
| Party | Candidate | Votes | % | ±% |
|---|---|---|---|---|
| Liberal | Rob Maclellan | 6,066 | 34.8 | +8.4 |
| Labor | James Hudson | 5,162 | 29.7 | +3.9 |
| Country | Robert Anderson | 4,195 | 24.1 | −10.8 |
| Democratic Labor | Michael Houlihan | 1,982 | 11.4 | −0.5 |
| Total formal votes | | 17,405 | 97.7 | +0.5 |
| Informal votes | | 407 | 2.3 | −0.5 |
| Turnout | | 17,812 | 95.4 | −0.2 |
Two-party-preferred result
| Liberal | Rob Maclellan | 9,161 | 52.6 | +16.0 |
| Labor | James Hudson | 8,244 | 47.4 | +47.4 |
| Liberal gain from Country | | Swing | N/A | |

=== Gisborne ===
1970 Victorian state election: Gisborne
| Party | Candidate | Votes | % | ±% |
|---|---|---|---|---|
| Liberal | Julian Doyle | 10,473 | 47.2 | +5.0 |
| Labor | Robert Harrison | 8,457 | 38.1 | +8.6 |
| Democratic Labor | Raymond Studham | 2,885 | 13.0 | −3.4 |
| Independent | Roy Hartley | 389 | 1.7 | +1.7 |
| Total formal votes | | 22,204 | 97.1 | +2.2 |
| Informal votes | | 658 | 2.9 | −2.2 |
| Turnout | | 22,862 | 94.6 | +1.8 |
Two-party-preferred result
| Liberal | Julian Doyle | 13,282 | 59.8 | −5.4 |
| Labor | Robert Harrison | 8,922 | 40.2 | +5.4 |
| Liberal hold | | Swing | −5.4 | |

=== Glen Iris ===
1970 Victorian state election: Glen Iris
| Party | Candidate | Votes | % | ±% |
|---|---|---|---|---|
| Liberal | Jim MacDonald | 12,261 | 53.6 | −2.4 |
| Labor | Douglas Gammon | 7,942 | 34.7 | +5.3 |
| Democratic Labor | John Preece | 2,657 | 11.6 | −3.0 |
| Total formal votes | | 22,860 | 97.9 | +0.3 |
| Informal votes | | 479 | 2.1 | −0.3 |
| Turnout | | 23,339 | 93.4 | −0.8 |
Two-party-preferred result
| Liberal | Jim MacDonald | 14,519 | 63.5 | −5.0 |
| Labor | Douglas Gammon | 8,341 | 36.5 | +5.0 |
| Liberal hold | | Swing | −5.0 | |

=== Glenhuntly ===
1970 Victorian state election: Glenhuntly
| Party | Candidate | Votes | % | ±% |
|---|---|---|---|---|
| Liberal | Joe Rafferty | 11,342 | 45.4 | −1.9 |
| Labor | Anthony Miller | 9,894 | 39.6 | +1.2 |
| Democratic Labor | Raymond Murphy | 3,770 | 15.1 | +0.8 |
| Total formal votes | | 25,006 | 96.5 | −0.7 |
| Informal votes | | 897 | 3.5 | +0.7 |
| Turnout | | 25,903 | 93.2 | −0.4 |
Two-party-preferred result
| Liberal | Joe Rafferty | 14,033 | 56.1 | −4.0 |
| Labor | Anthony Miller | 10,973 | 43.9 | +4.0 |
| Liberal hold | | Swing | −4.0 | |

=== Greensborough ===
1970 Victorian state election: Greensborough
| Party | Candidate | Votes | % | ±% |
|---|---|---|---|---|
| Labor | Bob Fell | 15,026 | 44.3 | +1.5 |
| Liberal | Monte Vale | 12,087 | 35.7 | −4.5 |
| Democratic Labor | Raymond Morrissey | 4,132 | 12.2 | −4.8 |
| Defence of Government Schools | Dorothy Frost | 2,661 | 7.9 | +7.9 |
| Total formal votes | | 33,906 | 97.8 | +0.1 |
| Informal votes | | 748 | 2.2 | −0.1 |
| Turnout | | 34,654 | 95.4 | +1.1 |
Two-party-preferred result
| Labor | Bob Fell | 17,642 | 52.0 | +5.3 |
| Liberal | Monte Vale | 16,264 | 48.0 | −5.3 |
| Labor gain from Liberal | | Swing | +5.3 | |

=== Hampden ===
1970 Victorian state election: Hampden
| Party | Candidate | Votes | % | ±% |
|---|---|---|---|---|
| Liberal | Henry Bolte | 7,292 | 42.9 | −1.7 |
| Labor | Vincent Ayres | 5,288 | 31.1 | +6.3 |
| Country | Gilbert Anderson | 2,746 | 16.2 | −0.8 |
| Democratic Labor | Francis O'Brien | 1,668 | 9.8 | +0.2 |
| Total formal votes | | 16,994 | 98.3 | +1.2 |
| Informal votes | | 295 | 1.7 | −1.2 |
| Turnout | | 17,289 | 96.1 | −0.5 |
Two-party-preferred result
| Liberal | Henry Bolte | 11,181 | 65.8 | −6.0 |
| Labor | Vincent Ayres | 5,813 | 34.2 | +6.0 |
| Liberal hold | | Swing | −6.0 | |

=== Hawthorn ===
1970 Victorian state election: Hawthorn
| Party | Candidate | Votes | % | ±% |
|---|---|---|---|---|
| Liberal | Walter Jona | 10,285 | 46.0 | −1.7 |
| Labor | David Andrews | 9,313 | 41.7 | +6.2 |
| Democratic Labor | Bernard Gaynor | 2,749 | 12.3 | −4.5 |
| Total formal votes | | 22,347 | 96.8 | 0.0 |
| Informal votes | | 734 | 3.2 | 0.0 |
| Turnout | | 23,081 | 92.4 | +0.6 |
Two-party-preferred result
| Liberal | Walter Jona | 12,652 | 56.6 | −3.0 |
| Labor | David Andrews | 9,695 | 43.4 | +3.0 |
| Liberal hold | | Swing | −3.0 | |

=== Heatherton ===
1970 Victorian state election: Heatherton
| Party | Candidate | Votes | % | ±% |
|---|---|---|---|---|
| Labor | Kenneth Bathie | 13,422 | 44.9 | +2.2 |
| Liberal | Norman Billing | 11,298 | 37.8 | −4.6 |
| Democratic Labor | Joseph O'Neill | 3,786 | 12.7 | −2.2 |
| Independent | Herman Crowther | 1,408 | 4.7 | +4.7 |
| Total formal votes | | 29,914 | 96.3 | −0.5 |
| Informal votes | | 1,142 | 3.7 | +0.5 |
| Turnout | | 31,056 | 95.2 | +0.8 |
Two-party-preferred result
| Liberal | Norman Billing | 15,069 | 50.4 | −3.4 |
| Labor | Kenneth Bathie | 14,845 | 49.6 | +3.4 |
| Liberal hold | | Swing | −3.4 | |

=== Ivanhoe ===
1970 Victorian state election: Ivanhoe
| Party | Candidate | Votes | % | ±% |
|---|---|---|---|---|
| Labor | Thomas Rich | 10,718 | 44.0 | +3.9 |
| Liberal | Vernon Christie | 10,211 | 41.9 | −1.2 |
| Democratic Labor | Michael Lucy | 3,444 | 14.1 | 0.0 |
| Total formal votes | | 24,373 | 97.4 | −0.1 |
| Informal votes | | 658 | 2.6 | +0.1 |
| Turnout | | 25,031 | 93.9 | −0.3 |
Two-party-preferred result
| Liberal | Vernon Christie | 13,312 | 54.6 | −2.6 |
| Labor | Thomas Rich | 11,061 | 45.4 | +2.6 |
| Liberal hold | | Swing | −2.6 | |

=== Kara Kara ===
1970 Victorian state election: Kara Kara
| Party | Candidate | Votes | % | ±% |
|---|---|---|---|---|
| Labor | Esmond Curnow | 5,508 | 34.3 | +7.5 |
| Country | Bill Phelan | 4,721 | 29.4 | −7.4 |
| Liberal | Bruce Thornhill | 4,352 | 27.1 | +0.6 |
| Democratic Labor | Robert O'Connor | 1,500 | 9.3 | −0.5 |
| Total formal votes | | 16,081 | 98.3 | −0.6 |
| Informal votes | | 282 | 1.7 | +0.6 |
| Turnout | | 16,363 | 97.0 | +0.7 |
Two-party-preferred result
| Labor | Esmond Curnow | 8,873 | 55.2 | +55.2 |
| Liberal | Bruce Thornhill | 7,208 | 44.8 | +7.4 |
| Labor gain from Country | | Swing | N/A | |

=== Kew ===
1970 Victorian state election: Kew
| Party | Candidate | Votes | % | ±% |
|---|---|---|---|---|
| Liberal | Arthur Rylah | 9,692 | 41.7 | −12.9 |
| Labor | Rosslyn Ives | 5,987 | 25.8 | −1.1 |
| Democratic Labor | Francis Duffy | 3,212 | 13.8 | −4.7 |
| Independent | Bertram Wainer | 2,624 | 11.3 | +11.3 |
| Independent | Dorothy Buchanan | 1,727 | 7.4 | +7.4 |
| Total formal votes | | 23,242 | 96.8 | −0.4 |
| Informal votes | | 756 | 3.2 | +0.4 |
| Turnout | | 23,998 | 93.0 | −0.4 |
Two-party-preferred result
| Liberal | Arthur Rylah | 13,808 | 59.4 | −10.9 |
| Labor | Rosslyn Ives | 9,434 | 40.6 | +10.9 |
| Liberal hold | | Swing | −10.9 | |

=== Lowan ===
1970 Victorian state election: Lowan
| Party | Candidate | Votes | % | ±% |
|---|---|---|---|---|
| Liberal | Jim McCabe | 6,008 | 33.9 | −6.2 |
| Country | Ray Buckley | 5,754 | 32.5 | −1.1 |
| Labor | Gustav Lehmann | 4,714 | 26.6 | +5.9 |
| Democratic Labor | John Giles | 1,240 | 7.0 | +1.4 |
| Total formal votes | | 17,716 | 98.3 | −0.3 |
| Informal votes | | 304 | 1.7 | +0.3 |
| Turnout | | 18,020 | 97.1 | +0.2 |
Two-party-preferred result
| Liberal | Jim McCabe | 12,241 | 69.1 | −5.9 |
| Labor | Gustav Lehmann | 5,475 | 30.9 | +5.9 |
Two-candidate-preferred result
| Liberal | Jim McCabe | 9,940 | 56.1 | +8.8 |
| Country | Ray Buckley | 7,776 | 43.9 | −8.8 |
| Liberal gain from Country | | Swing | +8.8 | |

=== Malvern ===
1970 Victorian state election: Malvern
| Party | Candidate | Votes | % | ±% |
|---|---|---|---|---|
| Liberal | Lindsay Thompson | 13,801 | 60.6 | −3.0 |
| Labor | Christopher Gaffney | 6,670 | 29.3 | +5.4 |
| Democratic Labor | Thomas O'Reilly | 2,303 | 10.1 | −2.4 |
| Total formal votes | | 22,774 | 97.3 | −0.1 |
| Informal votes | | 624 | 2.7 | +0.1 |
| Turnout | | 23,398 | 90.6 | −0.5 |
Two-party-preferred result
| Liberal | Lindsay Thompson | 15,759 | 69.2 | −5.0 |
| Labor | Christopher Gaffney | 7,015 | 30.8 | +5.0 |
| Liberal hold | | Swing | −5.0 | |

=== Melbourne ===
1970 Victorian state election: Melbourne
| Party | Candidate | Votes | % | ±% |
|---|---|---|---|---|
| Labor | Arthur Clarey | 12,768 | 60.5 | +0.9 |
| Liberal | Allan Waite | 5,428 | 25.7 | +0.6 |
| Democratic Labor | Michael McMahon | 2,908 | 13.8 | −1.5 |
| Total formal votes | | 21,104 | 94.2 | 0.0 |
| Informal votes | | 1,289 | 5.8 | 0.0 |
| Turnout | | 22,393 | 90.8 | +2.1 |
Two-party-preferred result
| Labor | Arthur Clarey | 13,204 | 62.6 | +0.7 |
| Liberal | Allan Waite | 7,900 | 37.4 | −0.7 |
| Labor hold | | Swing | +0.7 | |

=== Mentone ===
1970 Victorian state election: Mentone
| Party | Candidate | Votes | % | ±% |
|---|---|---|---|---|
| Labor | Henry Woodley | 10,772 | 43.6 | +2.0 |
| Liberal | Bill Templeton | 10,207 | 41.3 | −0.6 |
| Democratic Labor | Kathleen Andrews | 3,730 | 15.1 | +1.2 |
| Total formal votes | | 24,709 | 97.7 | +0.4 |
| Informal votes | | 593 | 2.3 | −0.4 |
| Turnout | | 25,302 | 94.0 | −0.7 |
Two-party-preferred result
| Liberal | Bill Templeton | 13,631 | 55.2 | −0.1 |
| Labor | Henry Woodley | 11,078 | 44.8 | +0.1 |
| Liberal hold | | Swing | −0.1 | |

=== Midlands ===
1970 Victorian state election: Midlands
| Party | Candidate | Votes | % | ±% |
|---|---|---|---|---|
| Labor | Les Shilton | 9,156 | 43.0 | −3.1 |
| Liberal | William Turnor | 6,617 | 31.1 | +3.8 |
| Democratic Labor | Francis Hill | 2,785 | 13.1 | +3.5 |
| Country | Leston Laity | 2,731 | 12.8 | −2.3 |
| Total formal votes | | 21,289 | 97.8 | +0.5 |
| Informal votes | | 478 | 2.2 | −0.5 |
| Turnout | | 21,767 | 94.1 | +1.1 |
Two-party-preferred result
| Labor | Les Shilton | 11,234 | 52.8 | +1.8 |
| Liberal | William Turnor | 10,055 | 47.2 | −1.8 |
| Labor hold | | Swing | +1.8 | |

=== Mildura ===
1970 Victorian state election: Mildura
| Party | Candidate | Votes | % | ±% |
|---|---|---|---|---|
| Country | Milton Whiting | 7,014 | 40.8 | −9.7 |
| Labor | Lance Fraser | 6,814 | 39.7 | +9.5 |
| Democratic Labor | John Conroy | 1,759 | 10.2 | −0.2 |
| Liberal | Kevin Coogan | 1,600 | 9.3 | +0.4 |
| Total formal votes | | 17,187 | 96.5 | −0.6 |
| Informal votes | | 614 | 3.5 | +0.6 |
| Turnout | | 17,801 | 95.2 | −0.4 |
Two-party-preferred result
| Country | Milton Whiting | 9,551 | 55.6 | −11.8 |
| Labor | Lance Fraser | 7,636 | 44.4 | +11.8 |
| Country hold | | Swing | −11.8 | |

=== Mitcham ===
1970 Victorian state election: Mitcham
| Party | Candidate | Votes | % | ±% |
|---|---|---|---|---|
| Labor | John Hyslop | 11,146 | 41.3 | +0.1 |
| Liberal | Dorothy Goble | 10,693 | 39.6 | −6.2 |
| Democratic Labor | Marianne Crowe | 3,294 | 12.2 | −0.8 |
| Defence of Government Schools | Ray Nilsen | 1,870 | 6.9 | +6.9 |
| Total formal votes | | 27,003 | 97.2 | −0.7 |
| Informal votes | | 774 | 2.8 | +0.7 |
| Turnout | | 27,777 | 94.8 | −0.4 |
Two-party-preferred result
| Liberal | Dorothy Goble | 14,122 | 52.3 | −4.7 |
| Labor | John Hyslop | 12,881 | 47.7 | +4.7 |
| Liberal hold | | Swing | −4.7 | |

=== Monbulk ===
1970 Victorian state election: Monbulk
| Party | Candidate | Votes | % | ±% |
|---|---|---|---|---|
| Liberal | Bill Borthwick | 12,582 | 47.3 | −3.6 |
| Labor | James Simmonds | 11,151 | 41.9 | +5.6 |
| Democratic Labor | George Noone | 2,865 | 10.8 | −0.8 |
| Total formal votes | | 26,598 | 97.1 | +0.3 |
| Informal votes | | 791 | 2.9 | −0.3 |
| Turnout | | 27,389 | 94.1 | +0.4 |
Two-party-preferred result
| Liberal | Bill Borthwick | 15,079 | 56.7 | −4.6 |
| Labor | James Simmonds | 11,519 | 43.3 | +4.6 |
| Liberal hold | | Swing | −4.6 | |

=== Moonee Ponds ===
1970 Victorian state election: Moonee Ponds
| Party | Candidate | Votes | % | ±% |
|---|---|---|---|---|
| Labor | Tom Edmunds | 12,146 | 52.6 | +5.0 |
| Liberal | John Williams | 7,485 | 32.4 | −0.1 |
| Democratic Labor | Barry O'Brien | 3,479 | 15.0 | 0.0 |
| Total formal votes | | 23,110 | 96.1 | 0.0 |
| Informal votes | | 934 | 3.9 | 0.0 |
| Turnout | | 24,044 | 95.2 | +1.0 |
Two-party-preferred result
| Labor | Tom Edmunds | 12,668 | 54.8 | +3.5 |
| Liberal | John Williams | 10,442 | 45.2 | −3.5 |
| Labor hold | | Swing | +3.5 | |

=== Moorabbin ===
1970 Victorian state election: Moorabbin
| Party | Candidate | Votes | % | ±% |
|---|---|---|---|---|
| Liberal | Llew Reese | 11,341 | 44.6 | −1.5 |
| Labor | Harry Rourke | 10,527 | 41.4 | +3.5 |
| Democratic Labor | Salvatore Pinzone | 3,562 | 14.0 | −2.0 |
| Total formal votes | | 25,340 | 97.4 | −0.1 |
| Informal votes | | 688 | 2.6 | +0.1 |
| Turnout | | 26,118 | 95.3 | +0.9 |
Two-party-preferred result
| Liberal | Llew Reese | 14,573 | 57.3 | −3.6 |
| Labor | Harry Rourke | 10,857 | 42.7 | +3.6 |
| Liberal hold | | Swing | −3.6 | |

=== Morwell ===
1970 Victorian state election: Morwell
| Party | Candidate | Votes | % | ±% |
|---|---|---|---|---|
| Labor | Derek Amos | 10,923 | 49.0 | +7.2 |
| Liberal | Archie Tanner | 6,012 | 27.0 | +6.2 |
| Country | James Wyeth | 2,854 | 12.8 | −11.3 |
| Democratic Labor | Thomas Lawless | 2,505 | 11.2 | −2.1 |
| Total formal votes | | 22,294 | 97.5 | +0.2 |
| Informal votes | | 578 | 2.5 | −0.2 |
| Turnout | | 22,872 | 95.1 | −0.5 |
Two-party-preferred result
| Labor | Derek Amos | 12,915 | 57.9 | +9.2 |
| Liberal | Archie Tanner | 9,379 | 42.1 | −9.2 |
| Labor gain from Liberal | | Swing | +9.2 | |

=== Murray Valley ===
1970 Victorian state election: Murray Valley
| Party | Candidate | Votes | % | ±% |
|---|---|---|---|---|
| Country | George Moss | 6,583 | 36.8 | −16.8 |
| Liberal | Robert Crosby | 4,909 | 27.5 | +12.6 |
| Labor | Valda Reid | 4,231 | 23.7 | +4.8 |
| Democratic Labor | John Patterson | 2,139 | 12.0 | −0.6 |
| Total formal votes | | 17,862 | 97.0 | +0.1 |
| Informal votes | | 557 | 3.0 | −0.1 |
| Turnout | | 18,419 | 94.5 | 0.0 |
Two-party-preferred result
| Country | George Moss | 13,016 | 72.9 | −4.8 |
| Labor | Valda Reid | 4,846 | 27.1 | +4.8 |
| Country hold | | Swing | −4.8 | |
Two-candidate-preferred result
| Country | George Moss | 11,041 | 61.8 | −15.9 |
| Liberal | Robert Crosby | 6,821 | 38.2 | +38.2 |
| Country hold | | Swing | −15.9 | |

=== Narracan ===
1970 Victorian state election: Narracan
| Party | Candidate | Votes | % | ±% |
|---|---|---|---|---|
| Labor | Wilfred Bartholomeusz | 8,125 | 38.8 | +8.3 |
| Liberal | Jim Balfour | 7,632 | 36.4 | −3.7 |
| Country | Reinhardt Reuter | 3,895 | 13.8 | −4.0 |
| Democratic Labor | Peter Saunders | 2,312 | 11.0 | −0.5 |
| Total formal votes | | 20,964 | 97.4 | −0.2 |
| Informal votes | | 554 | 2.6 | +0.2 |
| Turnout | | 21,518 | 95.4 | −0.5 |
Two-party-preferred result
| Liberal | Jim Balfour | 10,643 | 50.8 | −15.2 |
| Labor | Wilfred Bartholomeusz | 10,321 | 49.2 | +15.2 |
| Liberal hold | | Swing | −15.2 | |

=== Northcote ===
1970 Victorian state election: Northcote
| Party | Candidate | Votes | % | ±% |
|---|---|---|---|---|
| Labor | Frank Wilkes | 13,061 | 61.0 | +6.9 |
| Democratic Labor | Albert Dowsey | 8,338 | 39.0 | +23.2 |
| Total formal votes | | 21,399 | 94.3 | −1.9 |
| Informal votes | | 1,287 | 5.7 | +1.9 |
| Labor hold | | Swing | +4.5 | |

=== Oakleigh ===
1970 Victorian state election: Oakleigh
| Party | Candidate | Votes | % | ±% |
|---|---|---|---|---|
| Liberal | Alan Scanlan | 11,050 | 47.8 | +1.7 |
| Labor | Anthony Scarcella | 9,108 | 39.4 | −1.1 |
| Democratic Labor | Bernard Slattery | 2,978 | 12.9 | −0.5 |
| Total formal votes | | 23,136 | 96.8 | +1.7 |
| Informal votes | | 753 | 3.2 | −1.7 |
| Turnout | | 23,889 | 94.9 | −0.2 |
Two-party-preferred result
| Liberal | Alan Scanlan | 13,560 | 58.6 | +0.6 |
| Labor | Anthony Scarcella | 9,576 | 41.4 | −0.6 |
| Liberal hold | | Swing | +0.6 | |

=== Polwarth ===
1970 Victorian state election: Polwarth
| Party | Candidate | Votes | % | ±% |
|---|---|---|---|---|
| Liberal | Cec Burgin | 6,991 | 40.2 | −8.6 |
| Country | Douglas Wade | 4,891 | 28.1 | +9.2 |
| Labor | John O'Brien | 3,746 | 21.5 | +1.7 |
| Democratic Labor | Leonard Eyre | 1,777 | 10.2 | −2.4 |
| Total formal votes | | 17,405 | 98.1 | +0.4 |
| Informal votes | | 340 | 1.9 | −0.4 |
| Turnout | | 17,745 | 96.9 | +0.1 |
Two-party-preferred result
| Liberal | Cec Burgin | 10,213 | 58.7 | −18.9 |
| Labor | John O'Brien | 7,192 | 41.3 | +18.9 |
Two-candidate-preferred result
| Liberal | Cec Burgin | 8,771 | 50.4 | −27.2 |
| Country | Douglas Wade | 8,634 | 49.6 | +49.6 |
| Liberal hold | | Swing | N/A | |

=== Portland ===
1970 Victorian state election: Portland
| Party | Candidate | Votes | % | ±% |
|---|---|---|---|---|
| Labor | Bill Lewis | 6,807 | 38.3 | +5.6 |
| Liberal | Don McKellar | 5,726 | 32.2 | +3.1 |
| Country | Alma Uebergang | 3,681 | 20.7 | −8.1 |
| Democratic Labor | Adrian McInerney | 1,547 | 8.7 | −0.8 |
| Total formal votes | | 17,761 | 98.5 | +0.4 |
| Informal votes | | 272 | 1.5 | −0.4 |
| Turnout | | 18,033 | 96.7 | +0.1 |
Two-party-preferred result
| Labor | Bill Lewis | 9,371 | 52.8 | +6.4 |
| Liberal | Don McKellar | 8,390 | 47.2 | −6.4 |
| Labor gain from Liberal | | Swing | +6.4 | |

=== Prahran ===
1970 Victorian state election: Prahran
| Party | Candidate | Votes | % | ±% |
|---|---|---|---|---|
| Liberal | Sam Loxton | 9,188 | 42.1 | −2.3 |
| Labor | Ivan Trayling | 8,681 | 39.8 | +4.2 |
| Democratic Labor | John Johnston | 1,877 | 8.6 | 0.0 |
| Independent | James Banks | 1,460 | 6.7 | +6.7 |
| Defence of Government Schools | David Tuck | 601 | 2.8 | +2.8 |
| Total formal votes | | 21,807 | 95.2 | +0.2 |
| Informal votes | | 1,092 | 4.8 | −0.2 |
| Turnout | | 22,899 | 88.7 | −0.9 |
Two-party-preferred result
| Liberal | Sam Loxton | 11,983 | 55.0 | +1.2 |
| Labor | Ivan Trayling | 9,824 | 45.0 | −1.2 |
| Liberal hold | | Swing | +1.2 | |

=== Preston ===
1970 Victorian state election: Preston
| Party | Candidate | Votes | % | ±% |
|---|---|---|---|---|
| Labor | Carl Kirkwood | 11,958 | 54.5 | +3.7 |
| Liberal | Bruce Spicer | 6,127 | 27.9 | −3.0 |
| Democratic Labor | Maurice Horwood | 3,844 | 17.5 | −0.8 |
| Total formal votes | | 21,929 | 95.3 | −0.3 |
| Informal votes | | 1,071 | 4.7 | +0.3 |
| Turnout | | 23,000 | 94.7 | −0.7 |
Two-party-preferred result
| Labor | Carl Kirkwood | 12,534 | 57.1 | +3.6 |
| Liberal | Bruce Spicer | 9,395 | 42.9 | −3.6 |
| Labor hold | | Swing | +3.6 | |

=== Reservoir ===
1970 Victorian state election: Reservoir
| Party | Candidate | Votes | % | ±% |
|---|---|---|---|---|
| Labor | Jim Simmonds | 13,595 | 55.3 | +0.2 |
| Liberal | Robert Pritchard | 6,442 | 26.2 | −1.6 |
| Democratic Labor | Joseph Fitzgerald | 4,560 | 18.5 | +4.0 |
| Total formal votes | | 24,597 | 95.9 | +0.1 |
| Informal votes | | 1,053 | 4.1 | −0.1 |
| Turnout | | 25,650 | 95.9 | 0.0 |
Two-party-preferred result
| Labor | Jim Simmonds | 14,279 | 58.0 | −1.3 |
| Liberal | Robert Pritchard | 10,318 | 42.0 | +1.3 |
| Labor hold | | Swing | −1.3 | |

=== Richmond ===
1970 Victorian state election: Richmond
| Party | Candidate | Votes | % | ±% |
|---|---|---|---|---|
| Labor | Clyde Holding | 11,629 | 63.8 | +2.4 |
| Liberal | Ronald Turner | 3,204 | 17.6 | +1.5 |
| Democratic Labor | Terence Scully | 2,531 | 13.9 | −8.5 |
| Total formal votes | | 18,221 | 92.9 | −1.0 |
| Informal votes | | 1,381 | 7.1 | +1.0 |
| Turnout | | 19,602 | 91.9 | +0.6 |
Two-party-preferred result
| Labor | Clyde Holding | 12,437 | 68.3 | +3.5 |
| Liberal | Ronald Turner | 5,784 | 31.7 | −3.5 |
| Labor hold | | Swing | +3.5 | |

=== Ringwood ===
1970 Victorian state election: Ringwood
| Party | Candidate | Votes | % | ±% |
|---|---|---|---|---|
| Liberal | Jim Manson | 13,848 | 47.3 | −3.1 |
| Labor | Beatrice Rosindell | 12,166 | 41.6 | +6.6 |
| Democratic Labor | Edmund Sablovs | 3,268 | 11.2 | −3.4 |
| Total formal votes | | 29,282 | 97.8 | +0.2 |
| Informal votes | | 666 | 2.2 | −0.2 |
| Turnout | | 29,948 | 95.2 | +0.8 |
Two-party-preferred result
| Liberal | Jim Manson | 16,626 | 56.8 | −6.0 |
| Labor | Beatrice Rosindell | 12,656 | 43.2 | +6.0 |
| Liberal hold | | Swing | −6.0 | |

=== Rodney ===
1970 Victorian state election: Rodney
| Party | Candidate | Votes | % | ±% |
|---|---|---|---|---|
| Country | Russell McDonald | 8,972 | 49.7 | −9.3 |
| Labor | Doris Best | 3,677 | 20.4 | +7.8 |
| Liberal | Ian Biggar | 3,417 | 18.9 | +3.7 |
| Democratic Labor | Patrick Hansen | 2,002 | 11.1 | −2.1 |
| Total formal votes | | 18,068 | 97.3 | −0.1 |
| Informal votes | | 494 | 2.7 | +0.1 |
| Turnout | | 18,562 | 96.5 | −0.4 |
Two-party-preferred result
| Country | Russell McDonald | 13,776 | 76.2 | −7.7 |
| Labor | Doris Best | 4,292 | 23.8 | +7.7 |
| Country hold | | Swing | −7.7 | |

=== St Kilda ===
1970 Victorian state election: St Kilda
| Party | Candidate | Votes | % | ±% |
|---|---|---|---|---|
| Liberal | Brian Dixon | 10,318 | 46.0 | −5.5 |
| Labor | David Bottomley | 9,031 | 40.3 | +4.3 |
| Democratic Labor | John Hughes | 2,123 | 9.5 | −2.9 |
| Defence of Government Schools | Lancelot Hutchinson | 775 | 3.5 | +3.5 |
| Independent | Neville Penton | 180 | 0.8 | +0.8 |
| Total formal votes | | 22,427 | 95.0 | −0.9 |
| Informal votes | | 1,177 | 5.0 | +0.9 |
| Turnout | | 23,604 | 91.6 | +2.2 |
Two-party-preferred result
| Liberal | Brian Dixon | 12,541 | 55.9 | −6.2 |
| Labor | David Bottomley | 9,886 | 44.1 | +6.2 |
| Liberal hold | | Swing | −6.2 | |

=== Sandringham ===
1970 Victorian state election: Sandringham
| Party | Candidate | Votes | % | ±% |
|---|---|---|---|---|
| Liberal | Max Crellin | 12,093 | 51.1 | −2.9 |
| Labor | Margaret Graham | 9,061 | 38.3 | +5.9 |
| Democratic Labor | William Leech | 2,522 | 10.6 | −3.0 |
| Total formal votes | | 23,676 | 98.1 | +0.4 |
| Informal votes | | 462 | 1.9 | −0.4 |
| Turnout | | 24,138 | 94.1 | +0.6 |
Two-party-preferred result
| Liberal | Max Crellin | 14,237 | 60.1 | −5.4 |
| Labor | Margaret Graham | 9,439 | 39.9 | +5.4 |
| Liberal hold | | Swing | −5.4 | |

=== Scoresby ===
1970 Victorian state election: Scoresby
| Party | Candidate | Votes | % | ±% |
|---|---|---|---|---|
| Labor | Alan West | 15,937 | 42.4 | +4.2 |
| Liberal | Geoff Hayes | 15,932 | 42.3 | −2.4 |
| Democratic Labor | Noel Clarke | 5,757 | 15.3 | −1.8 |
| Total formal votes | | 37,626 | 97.5 | +0.2 |
| Informal votes | | 735 | 2.7 | −0.2 |
| Turnout | | 38,594 | 95.3 | +0.4 |
Two-party-preferred result
| Liberal | Geoff Hayes | 21,115 | 56.1 | −3.9 |
| Labor | Alan West | 16,511 | 43.9 | +3.9 |
| Liberal hold | | Swing | −3.9 | |

=== Shepparton ===
1970 Victorian state election: Shepparton
| Party | Candidate | Votes | % | ±% |
|---|---|---|---|---|
| Country | Peter Ross-Edwards | 7,676 | 41.6 | +5.6 |
| Independent | Bill Hunter | 3,586 | 19.4 | +1.7 |
| Labor | Graham Romanes | 3,332 | 18.1 | +0.4 |
| Liberal | Linton Laws | 1,995 | 10.8 | −6.4 |
| Democratic Labor | Bruno D'Elia | 1,875 | 10.1 | −1.3 |
| Total formal votes | | 18,464 | 95.8 | +1.1 |
| Informal votes | | 810 | 4.2 | −1.1 |
| Turnout | | 19,274 | 96.2 | +0.1 |
Two-party-preferred result
| Country | Peter Ross-Edwards | 13,479 | 73.0 | −4.6 |
| Labor | Graham Romanes | 4,985 | 27.0 | +4.6 |
Two-candidate-preferred result
| Country | Peter Ross-Edwards | 9,412 | 51.0 | −1.0 |
| Independent | Bill Hunter | 9,052 | 49.0 | +1.0 |
| Country hold | | Swing | −1.0 | |

=== Sunshine ===
1970 Victorian state election: Sunshine
| Party | Candidate | Votes | % | ±% |
|---|---|---|---|---|
| Labor | Denis Lovegrove | 13,976 | 60.8 | +2.5 |
| Liberal | Vaclav Ubl | 5,202 | 22.6 | +1.2 |
| Democratic Labor | Robert Charles | 3,808 | 16.6 | +0.1 |
| Total formal votes | | 22,986 | 94.9 | −0.1 |
| Informal votes | | 1,241 | 5.1 | +0.1 |
| Turnout | | 24,227 | 94.8 | +1.7 |
Two-party-preferred result
| Labor | Denis Lovegrove | 14,548 | 63.3 | +0.6 |
| Liberal | Vaclav Ubl | 8,438 | 36.7 | −0.6 |
| Labor hold | | Swing | +0.6 | |

=== Swan Hill ===
1970 Victorian state election: Swan Hill
| Party | Candidate | Votes | % | ±% |
|---|---|---|---|---|
| Country | Henry Broad | 6,960 | 39.9 | −17.3 |
| Labor | Jack McLean | 4,605 | 26.4 | +11.7 |
| Liberal | Laurence Troy | 3,564 | 20.4 | +8.9 |
| Democratic Labor | Rodger Donohue | 2,312 | 13.3 | −3.3 |
| Total formal votes | | 17,441 | 97.2 | −0.4 |
| Informal votes | | 495 | 2.8 | +0.4 |
| Turnout | | 17,936 | 95.8 | +0.2 |
Two-party-preferred result
| Country | Henry Broad | 12,268 | 70.3 | −11.4 |
| Labor | Jack McLean | 5,173 | 29.7 | +11.4 |
Two-candidate-preferred result
| Country | Henry Broad | 11,437 | 65.6 | −16.1 |
| Liberal | Laurence Troy | 6,004 | 34.4 | +34.4 |
| Country hold | | Swing | −16.1 | |

=== Syndal ===
1970 Victorian state election: Syndal
| Party | Candidate | Votes | % | ±% |
|---|---|---|---|---|
| Liberal | Ray Wiltshire | 15,341 | 46.7 | −3.3 |
| Labor | Peter Setford | 12,667 | 38.5 | +2.6 |
| Democratic Labor | Daniel McCabe | 4,872 | 14.8 | +0.8 |
| Total formal votes | | 32,880 | 97.8 | −0.1 |
| Informal votes | | 731 | 2.2 | +0.1 |
| Turnout | | 33,611 | 95.7 | +0.4 |
Two-party-preferred result
| Liberal | Ray Wiltshire | 19,210 | 58.4 | −3.6 |
| Labor | Peter Setford | 13,670 | 41.6 | +3.6 |
| Liberal hold | | Swing | −3.6 | |

=== Warrnambool ===
1970 Victorian state election: Warrnambool
| Party | Candidate | Votes | % | ±% |
|---|---|---|---|---|
| Liberal | Ian Smith | 6,650 | 36.7 | +8.1 |
| Labor | Donald Grossman | 5,181 | 28.6 | +3.7 |
| Democratic Labor | Francis Hasell | 3,448 | 19.0 | −2.6 |
| Country | Cyril Boyle | 2,138 | 11.8 | −3.2 |
| Defence of Government Schools | Robert McCosh | 711 | 3.9 | +3.9 |
| Total formal votes | | 18,128 | 98.2 | +0.2 |
| Informal votes | | 334 | 1.8 | −0.2 |
| Turnout | | 18,462 | 96.7 | 0.0 |
Two-party-preferred result
| Liberal | Ian Smith | 10,652 | 58.8 | −10.6 |
| Labor | Donald Grossman | 7,476 | 41.2 | +10.6 |
| Liberal hold | | Swing | −10.6 | |

=== Williamstown ===
1970 Victorian state election: Williamstown
| Party | Candidate | Votes | % | ±% |
|---|---|---|---|---|
| Labor | Larry Floyd | 16,322 | 63.8 | +2.4 |
| Liberal | Richard Groom | 5,880 | 23.0 | +10.1 |
| Democratic Labor | Norman Way | 3,389 | 13.2 | −8.3 |
| Total formal votes | | 25,591 | 95.8 | +0.6 |
| Informal votes | | 1,111 | 4.2 | −0.6 |
| Turnout | | 26,702 | 94.8 | +0.8 |
Two-party-preferred result
| Labor | Larry Floyd | 16,831 | 65.8 | −2.6 |
| Liberal | Richard Groom | 8,760 | 34.2 | +2.6 |
| Labor hold | | Swing | −2.6 | |

== See also ==
- 1970 Victorian state election
- Members of the Victorian Legislative Assembly, 1970–1973
