= Electoral results for the district of Springvale =

Australian district election results

This is a list of electoral results for the Electoral district of Springvale in Victorian state elections.

== Members for Springvale ==
Member	Party	Term
Norman Billing	Liberal Party	1976–1979
Kevin King	Labor Party	1979–1983
Eddie Micallef	Labor Party	1983–1999
Tim Holding	Labor Party	1999–2002

== Election results ==
=== Elections in the 1990s ===
1999 Victorian state election: Springvale
Party	Candidate	Votes	%	±%
Labor	Tim Holding	18,230	57.9	+2.9
Liberal	John Campbell	11,152	35.4	−2.7
Independent	Barbara Liu-Hyland	1,680	5.3	+5.3
Independent	Robert Bisset	398	1.3	+1.3
Total formal votes		31,460	95.5	−1.2
Informal votes		1,476	4.5	+1.2
Turnout		32,936	92.9	
Two-party-preferred result
Labor	Tim Holding	19,114	60.8	+2.9
Liberal	John Campbell	12,322	39.2	−2.9
Labor hold		Swing	+2.9	

1996 Victorian state election: Springvale
Party	Candidate	Votes	%	±%
Labor	Eddie Micallef	17,076	55.0	+3.3
Liberal	Miriam Hillenga	11,850	38.2	−1.3
Independent	Andrew Hooper-Nguyen	2,110	6.8	+6.8
Total formal votes		31,036	96.7	+2.5
Informal votes		1,054	3.3	−2.5
Turnout		32,090	94.1	
Two-party-preferred result
Labor	Eddie Micallef	17,941	57.9	−0.1
Liberal	Miriam Hillenga	13,066	42.1	+0.1
Labor hold		Swing	−0.1	

1992 Victorian state election: Springvale
Party	Candidate	Votes	%	±%
Labor	Eddie Micallef	15,569	51.7	−7.6
Liberal	Mario Dodic	11,902	39.5	+2.5
Independent	Lorna Stevenson	2,656	8.8	+8.8
Total formal votes		30,127	94.2	+1.3
Informal votes		1,842	5.8	−1.3
Turnout		31,969	95.2	
Two-party-preferred result
Labor	Eddie Micallef	17,420	58.0	−3.0
Liberal	Mario Dodic	12,603	42.0	+3.0
Labor hold		Swing	−3.0	

=== Elections in the 1980s ===
1988 Victorian state election: Springvale
Party	Candidate	Votes	%	±%
Labor	Eddie Micallef	14,900	52.86	−4.15
Liberal	Kieran Magee	10,479	39.68	−3.31
Call to Australia	Jodie Rickard	1,320	5.00	+5.00
National	Wernfried Klimek	650	2.46	+2.46
Total formal votes		26,409	92.73	−3.21
Informal votes		2,071	7.27	+3.21
Turnout		28,480	93.20	−0.57
Two-party-preferred result
Labor	Eddie Micallef	14,900	56.42	−0.59
Liberal	Kieran Magee	11,509	43.38	+0.59
Labor hold		Swing	−0.59	

1985 Victorian state election: Springvale
Party	Candidate	Votes	%	±%
Labor	Eddie Micallef	15,207	57.0	+3.0
Liberal	Therese Marley	11,465	43.0	+2.5
Total formal votes		26,672	95.9	
Informal votes		1,130	4.1	
Turnout		27,802	93.8	
Labor hold		Swing	−0.8	

1983 Springvale state by-election
Party	Candidate	Votes	%	±%
Labor	Eddie Micallef	16,682	57.3	+3.8
Liberal	Jordan Topalides	9,692	33.3	−4.8
DLP−Call to Australia	John Mulholland	1,921	6.6	+3.6
Social Democrats	Peter Allan	803	2.8	+2.8
Total formal votes		29,098	97.7	+0.8
Informal votes		681	2.3	−0.8
Turnout		29,779	87.9	−6.5
Two-party-preferred result
Labor	Eddie Micallef		60.0	+3.1
Liberal	Jordan Topalides		40.0	−3.1
Labor hold		Swing	+3.1	

1982 Victorian state election: Springvale
Party	Candidate	Votes	%	±%
Labor	Kevin King	15,798	53.5	+7.1
Liberal	Graeme Duggan	11,228	38.1	−4.7
Democrats	Morag Thorne	1,601	5.4	−2.3
Democratic Labor	Elaine Mulholland	885	3.0	+3.0
Total formal votes		29,512	96.9	+0.7
Informal votes		948	3.1	−0.7
Turnout		30,460	94.4	+0.1
Two-party-preferred result
Labor	Kevin King	16,808	56.9	+6.2
Liberal	Graeme Duggan	12,704	43.1	−6.2
Labor hold		Swing	+6.2	

=== Elections in the 1970s ===
1979 Victorian state election: Springvale
Party	Candidate	Votes	%	±%
Labor	Kevin King	12,781	46.4	+0.8
Liberal	Norman Billing	11,795	42.8	−11.6
Democrats	James Wright	2,111	7.7	+7.7
Independent	Edward Woods	887	3.2	+3.2
Total formal votes		27,574	96.2	−0.3
Informal votes		1,084	3.8	+0.3
Turnout		28,658	94.3	+1.0
Two-party-preferred result
Labor	Kevin King	13,980	50.7	+5.1
Liberal	Norman Billing	13,594	49.3	−5.1
Labor gain from Liberal		Swing	+5.1	

1976 Victorian state election: Springvale
Party	Candidate	Votes	%	±%
Liberal	Norman Billing	13,737	54.4	+7.1
Labor	Kevin King	11,498	45.6	+1.1
Total formal votes		25,235	96.5	
Informal votes		926	3.5	
Turnout		26,161	93.3	
Liberal hold		Swing	+0.5	
