= Members of the Victorian Legislative Assembly, 1988–1992 =

- ←1985–1988 1992–1996→

This is a list of members of the Victorian Legislative Assembly from 1988 to 1992, as elected at the 1988 state election:

Name	Party	Electorate	Term in office
Alex Andrianopoulos	Labor	St Albans	1985–2002
Hon Tom Austin	Liberal	Ripon	1972–1992
Hon Ian Baker	Labor	Sunshine	1988–1999
Ann Barker	Labor	Bentleigh	1988–1992, 1999–2014
Peter Batchelor ^{[3]}	Labor	Thomastown	1990–2010
Craig Bildstien	Liberal	Mildura	1988–1996
Alan Brown	Liberal	Gippsland West	1979–1996
Hon John Cain	Labor	Bundoora	1976–1992
Robert Clark	Liberal	Balwyn	1988–2018
Hon Ken Coghill	Labor	Werribee	1979–1996
Neil Cole	Labor	Melbourne	1988–1999
Geoff Coleman	Liberal	Syndal	1976–1982, 1985–1999
Robin Cooper	Liberal	Mornington	1985–2006
Hon Steve Crabb	Labor	Knox	1976–1992
David Cunningham	Labor	Derrimut	1985–1999
John Delzoppo	Liberal	Narracan	1982–1996
Harley Dickinson	Liberal/Independent ^{[5]}	South Barwon	1982–1992
Demetri Dollis	Labor	Richmond	1988–1999
Steve Elder	Liberal	Ballarat North	1988–1999
Graham Ernst	Labor	Bellarine	1979–1992
Bruce Evans	National	Gippsland East	1961–1992
Hon Robert Fordham	Labor	Footscray	1970–1992
Sherryl Garbutt ^{[2]}	Labor	Greensborough	1989–2006
Peter Gavin	Labor	Coburg	1979–1992
Beth Gleeson ^{[3]}	Labor	Thomastown	1985–1989
Phil Gude	Liberal	Hawthorn	1976–1979, 1985–1999
Keith Hamilton	Labor	Morwell	1988–2002
Eddie Hann ^{[1]}	National	Rodney	1973–1989
Hon John Harrowfield	Labor	Mitcham	1982–1992
Don Hayward	Liberal	Prahran	1985–1996
Vin Heffernan	Liberal	Ivanhoe	1985–1996
Jane Hill	Labor	Frankston North	1982–1992
Carolyn Hirsh	Labor	Wantirna	1985–1992
Phil Honeywood	Liberal	Warrandyte	1988–2006
Ken Jasper	National	Murray Valley	1976–2010
Michael John	Liberal	Bendigo East	1985–1999
Hon Rob Jolly	Labor	Doveton	1979–1992
Hon Jim Kennan	Labor	Broadmeadows	1988–1993
David Kennedy	Labor	Bendigo West	1982–1992
Hon Jeff Kennett	Liberal	Burwood	1976–1999
Don Kilgour ^{[4]}	National	Shepparton	1991–2002
Hon Joan Kirner	Labor	Williamstown	1988–1994
David Lea	Liberal	Sandringham	1985–1992
Geoff Leigh	Liberal	Malvern	1982–2002
Michael Leighton	Labor	Preston	1988–2006
Hon Lou Lieberman	Liberal	Benambra	1976–1992
Hon Rob Maclellan	Liberal	Berwick	1970–2002
Hon Race Mathews	Labor	Oakleigh	1979–1992
Noel Maughan ^{[1]}	National	Rodney	1989–2006
Hon Andrew McCutcheon	Labor	St Kilda	1982–1992
Max McDonald	Labor	Whittlesea	1982–1992
Bill McGrath	National	Lowan	1979–1999
John McGrath	National	Warrnambool	1985–1999
Pat McNamara	National	Benalla	1982–2000
Eddie Micallef	Labor	Springvale	1983–1999
Dr Denis Napthine	Liberal	Portland	1988–2015
Terry Norris	Labor	Dandenong	1982–1992
David Perrin	Liberal	Bulleen	1985–1999
Victor Perton	Liberal	Doncaster	1988–2006
Roger Pescott	Liberal	Bennettswood	1985–1997
Hon Jim Plowman	Liberal	Evelyn	1973–1982, 1985–1999
Hon Neil Pope	Labor	Monbulk	1982–1992
Margaret Ray	Labor	Box Hill	1982–1992
Tom Reynolds	Liberal	Gisborne	1979–1999
John Richardson	Liberal	Forest Hill	1976–2002
Hon Tom Roper	Labor	Brunswick	1973–1994
Peter Ross-Edwards ^{[4]}	National	Shepparton	1967–1991
Barry Rowe	Labor	Essendon	1979–1992
Hon Mal Sandon	Labor	Carrum	1988–1996
George Seitz	Labor	Keilor	1982–2010
Bob Sercombe	Labor	Niddrie	1988–1996
Frank Sheehan	Labor	Ballarat South	1982–1992
Hon Tony Sheehan	Labor	Northcote	1982–1985, 1988–1998
Hayden Shell	Labor	Geelong	1982–1992
Hon Kay Setches	Labor	Ringwood	1982–1992
Jim Simmonds	Labor	Reservoir	1969–1992
Hon Ian Smith	Liberal	Polwarth	1967–1983, 1985–1999
Ross Smith	Liberal	Glen Waverley	1985–2002
Hon Peter Spyker	Labor	Mentone	1979–1992
Barry Steggall	National	Swan Hill	1983–2002
Alan Stockdale	Liberal	Brighton	1985–1999
Ted Tanner	Liberal	Caulfield	1979–1996
Kelvin Thomson	Labor	Pascoe Vale	1988–1996
Hon Pauline Toner ^{[2]}	Labor	Greensborough	1977–1989
Neil Trezise	Labor	Geelong North	1964–1992
Gerard Vaughan	Labor	Clayton	1979–1996
Jan Wade	Liberal	Kew	1988–1999
Tom Wallace	National	Gippsland South	1982–1992
Bunna Walsh	Labor	Albert Park	1979–1992
Graeme Weideman	Liberal	Frankston South	1976–1982, 1985–1996
Dr Ron Wells	Liberal	Dromana	1985–1992
Jan Wilson	Labor	Dandenong North	1985–1999

^{1} In January 1989, the National member for Rodney, Eddie Hann, resigned. National candidate Noel Maughan won the resulting by-election on 4 March 1989.
^{2} On 28 February 1989, the Labor member for Greensborough, Pauline Toner, resigned due to ill health, and subsequently died of cancer on 3 March. Labor candidate Sherryl Garbutt won the resulting by-election on 15 April 1989.
^{3} On 16 December 1989, the Labor member for Thomastown, Beth Gleeson, died of cancer. Labor candidate Peter Batchelor won the resulting by-election on 3 February 1990.
^{4} On 20 August 1991, the National member for Shepparton, Peter Ross-Edwards, resigned. National candidate Don Kilgour won the resulting by-election on 19 October 1991.
^{5} On 20 May 1992, the member for South Barwon, Harley Dickinson, resigned from the Liberal Party after losing preselection to recontest his seat. He served for the remainder of his term as an independent.
