= Members of the Victorian Legislative Assembly, 1985–1988 =

- ←1982–1985 1988–1992→

This is a list of members of the Victorian Legislative Assembly from 1985 to 1988, as elected at the 1985 state election:

Name	Party	Electorate	Term in office
Alex Andrianopoulos	Labor	St Albans	1985–2002
Hon Tom Austin	Liberal	Ripon	1972–1992
Alan Brown	Liberal	Gippsland West	1979–1996
Hon John Cain	Labor	Bundoora	1976–1992
Valerie Callister	Labor	Morwell	1981–1984, 1984–1988
Hon Ian Cathie	Labor	Carrum	1976–1988
Ken Coghill	Labor	Werribee	1979–1996
Geoff Coleman	Liberal	Syndal	1976–1982, 1985–1999
Robin Cooper	Liberal	Mornington	1985–2006
Hon Steve Crabb	Labor	Knox	1976–1992
Digby Crozier	Liberal	Portland	1985–1988
Jack Culpin	Labor	Broadmeadows	1976–1988
David Cunningham	Labor	Derrimut	1985–1999
John Delzoppo	Liberal	Narracan	1982–1996
Harley Dickinson	Liberal	South Barwon	1982–1992
Hon Tom Edmunds	Labor	Pascoe Vale	1967–1988
Steve Elder ^{[2]}	Liberal	Ballarat North	1988–1999
Graham Ernst	Labor	Bellarine	1979–1992
Bruce Evans	National	Gippsland East	1961–1992
Tom Evans ^{[2]}	Liberal	Ballarat North	1960–1988
Bill Fogarty	Labor	Sunshine	1973–1988
Hon Robert Fordham	Labor	Footscray	1970–1992
Peter Gavin	Labor	Coburg	1979–1992
Beth Gleeson	Labor	Thomastown	1985–1989
Phil Gude	Liberal	Hawthorn	1976–1979, 1985–1999
Eddie Hann	National	Rodney	1973–1989
John Harrowfield	Labor	Mitcham	1982–1992
Don Hayward	Liberal	Prahran	1985–1996
Vin Heffernan	Liberal	Ivanhoe	1985–1996
Jane Hill	Labor	Frankston North	1982–1992
Lou Hill	Labor	Warrandyte	1982–1988
Carolyn Hirsh	Labor	Wantirna	1985–1992
Gordon Hockley	Labor	Bentleigh	1979–1988
Ken Jasper	National	Murray Valley	1976–2010
Michael John	Liberal	Bendigo East	1985–1999
Hon Rob Jolly	Labor	Doveton	1979–1992
David Kennedy	Labor	Bendigo West	1982–1992
Hon Jeff Kennett	Liberal	Burwood	1976–1999
Carl Kirkwood	Labor	Preston	1970–1988
David Lea	Liberal	Sandringham	1985–1992
Geoff Leigh	Liberal	Malvern	1982–2002
Hon Lou Lieberman	Liberal	Benambra	1976–1992
Hon Rob Maclellan	Liberal	Berwick	1970–2002
Hon Race Mathews	Labor	Oakleigh	1979–1992
Hon Andrew McCutcheon	Labor	St Kilda	1982–1992
Max McDonald	Labor	Whittlesea	1982–1992
Bill McGrath	National	Lowan	1979–1999
John McGrath	National	Warrnambool	1985–1999
Pat McNamara	National	Benalla	1982–2000
Eddie Micallef	Labor	Springvale	1983–1999
Terry Norris	Labor	Dandenong	1982–1992
David Perrin	Liberal	Bulleen	1985–1999
Roger Pescott	Liberal	Bennettswood	1985–1997
Hon Jim Plowman	Liberal	Evelyn	1973–1982, 1985–1999
Neil Pope	Labor	Monbulk	1982–1992
Hon Jim Ramsay	Liberal	Balwyn	1973–1988
Margaret Ray	Labor	Box Hill	1982–1992
Keith Remington	Labor	Melbourne	1977–1988
Tom Reynolds	Liberal	Gisborne	1979–1999
John Richardson	Liberal	Forest Hill	1976–2002
Hon Tom Roper	Labor	Brunswick	1973–1994
Peter Ross-Edwards	National	Shepparton	1967–1991
Barry Rowe	Labor	Essendon	1979–1992
George Seitz	Labor	Keilor	1982–2010
Frank Sheehan	Labor	Ballarat South	1982–1992
Hayden Shell	Labor	Geelong	1982–1992
Kay Setches	Labor	Ringwood	1982–1992
Prue Sibree ^{[1]}	Liberal	Kew	1981–1988
Jim Simmonds	Labor	Reservoir	1969–1992
Theo Sidiropoulos	Labor	Richmond	1977–1988
Jack Simpson	Labor	Niddrie	1976–1988
Hon Ian Smith	Liberal	Polwarth	1967–1983, 1985–1999
Ross Smith	Liberal	Glen Waverley	1985–2002
Hon Peter Spyker	Labor	Mentone	1979–1992
Barry Steggall	National	Swan Hill	1983–2002
Gordon Stirling	Labor	Williamstown	1973–1988
Alan Stockdale	Liberal	Brighton	1985–1999
Ted Tanner	Liberal	Caulfield	1979–1996
Hon Pauline Toner	Labor	Greensborough	1977–1989
Neil Trezise	Labor	Geelong North	1964–1992
Gerard Vaughan	Labor	Clayton	1979–1996
Jan Wade ^{[1]}	Liberal	Kew	1988–1999
Tom Wallace	National	Gippsland South	1982–1992
Bunna Walsh	Labor	Albert Park	1979–1992
Graeme Weideman	Liberal	Frankston South	1976–1982, 1985–1996
Dr Ron Wells	Liberal	Dromana	1985–1992
Milton Whiting	National	Mildura	1962–1988
Hon Frank Wilkes	Labor	Northcote	1957–1988
Morris Williams	Liberal	Doncaster	1973–1988
Jan Wilson	Labor	Dandenong North	1985–1999

^{1} The Liberal member for Kew, Prue Leggoe, resigned on 8 February 1988. Liberal candidate Jan Wade was elected to replace her at the by-election held on 19 March 1988.
^{2} The Liberal member for Ballarat North, Tom Evans, resigned on 9 May 1988. Liberal candidate Steve Elder was elected to replace him at the by-election held on 23 July 1988.
