= Electoral results for the district of Heatherton =

Victoria, Australia, district election results

This is a list of electoral results for the electoral district of Heatherton in Victorian state elections.

== Members for Heatherton ==
Member	Party	Term
Norman Billing	Liberal	1967–1976
Llew Reese	Liberal	1976–1979
Peter Spyker	Labor	1979–1985

== Election results ==
=== Elections in the 1980s ===
1982 Victorian state election: Heatherton
Party	Candidate	Votes	%	±%
Labor	Peter Spyker	16,746	55.3	+9.2
Liberal	Geoff Leigh	10,924	36.1	−6.3
Democrats	Michael Johnson	2,619	8.7	−2.8
Total formal votes		30,289	97.1	+0.6
Informal votes		902	2.9	−0.6
Turnout		31,191	95.3	+1.6
Two-party-preferred result
Labor	Peter Spyker	18,252	60.3	+9.3
Liberal	Geoff Leigh	12,037	39.7	−9.3
Labor hold		Swing	+9.3	

=== Elections in the 1970s ===
1979 Victorian state election: Heatherton
Party	Candidate	Votes	%	±%
Labor	Peter Spyker	12,897	46.1	+1.5
Liberal	Llew Reese	11,866	42.4	−13.0
Democrats	Sonia Sargood	3,201	11.5	+11.5
Total formal votes		27,964	96.5	−0.4
Informal votes		1,000	3.5	+0.4
Turnout		28,964	93.7	+0.3
Two-party-preferred result
Labor	Peter Spyker	14,276	51.0	+6.4
Liberal	Llew Reese	13,688	49.0	−6.4
Labor gain from Liberal		Swing	+6.4	

1976 Victorian state election: Heatherton
Party	Candidate	Votes	%	±%
Liberal	Llew Reese	14,542	55.4	+5.7
Labor	Peter Spyker	11,690	44.6	+1.4
Total formal votes		26,232	96.9	
Informal votes		851	3.1	
Turnout		27,083	93.4	
Liberal hold		Swing	−0.3	

1973 Victorian state election: Heatherton
Party	Candidate	Votes	%	±%
Liberal	Norman Billing	18,288	48.7	+10.9
Labor	John Wilson	16,805	44.8	−0.1
Democratic Labor	Brian Sherman	2,450	6.5	−6.2
Total formal votes		37,543	96.9	+0.6
Informal votes		1,181	3.1	−0.6
Turnout		38,724	94.2	−1.0
Two-party-preferred result
Liberal	Norman Billing	20,409	54.4	+4.0
Labor	John Wilson	17,134	45.6	−4.0
Liberal hold		Swing	+4.0	

1970 Victorian state election: Heatherton
Party	Candidate	Votes	%	±%
Labor	Kenneth Bathie	13,422	44.9	+2.2
Liberal	Norman Billing	11,298	37.8	−4.6
Democratic Labor	Joseph O'Neill	3,786	12.7	−2.2
Independent	Herman Crowther	1,408	4.7	+4.7
Total formal votes		29,914	96.3	−0.5
Informal votes		1,142	3.7	+0.5
Turnout		31,056	95.2	+0.8
Two-party-preferred result
Liberal	Norman Billing	15,069	50.4	−3.4
Labor	Kenneth Bathie	14,845	49.6	+3.4
Liberal hold		Swing	−3.4	

=== Elections in the 1960s ===
1967 Victorian state election: Heatherton
Party	Candidate	Votes	%	±%
Labor	Keith Ewert	10,467	42.7	−0.2
Liberal	Norman Billing	10,395	42.4	+2.3
Democratic Labor	Joseph O'Neill	3,663	14.9	−1.1
Total formal votes		24,525	96.8	
Informal votes		799	3.2	
Turnout		25,324	94.4	
Two-party-preferred result
Liberal	Norman Billing	13,196	53.8	+1.1
Labor	Keith Ewert	11,329	46.2	−1.1
Liberal hold		Swing	+1.1	
