= 1983 Springvale state by-election =

- 19 March 1983

Electoral district of Springvale in the Victorian Legislative Assembly
	First party	Second party
	ALP	LIB
Candidate	Eddie Micallef	Jordan Topalides
Party	Labor	Liberal
Popular vote	16,682	9,692
Percentage	57.3%	33.3%
Swing	▲3.8	▼4.8
TCP	60.0%	40.0%
TCP swing	▲3.1	▼3.1
MP before election
Kevin King
Labor
Elected MP
Eddie Micallef
Labor

The 1983 Springvale state by-election was held on 19 March 1983 to elect the next member for Springvale in the Victorian Legislative Assembly, following the death of incumbent Kevin King.

== Results ==
The seat was retained for Labor by Eddie Micallef.

Democratic Labor Party candidate John Mulholland ran as a "DLP-Call to Australia coalition" candidate.

1983 Springvale state by-election
Party	Candidate	Votes	%	±%
Labor	Eddie Micallef	16,682	57.3	+3.8
Liberal	Jordan Topalides	9,692	33.3	−4.8
DLP−Call to Australia	John Mulholland	1,921	6.6	+3.6
Social Democrats	Peter Allan	803	2.8	+2.8
Total formal votes		29,098	97.7	+0.8
Informal votes		681	2.3	−0.8
Turnout		29,779	87.9	−6.5
Two-party-preferred result
Labor	Eddie Micallef		60.0	+3.1
Liberal	Jordan Topalides		40.0	−3.1
Labor hold		Swing	+3.1	
