= Electoral district of Moorabbin =

Former electoral district in Australia

Coordinates: 37°56′S 145°03′E

Moorabbin Victoria—Legislative Assembly
- State: Victoria
- Created: 1955
- Abolished: 1976
- Namesake: Suburb of Moorabbin
- Demographic: Metropolitan

Electoral district of Moorabbin was an electoral district of the Legislative Assembly in the Australian state of Victoria.

== Members for Moorabbin ==
Member	Party	Term
Bob Suggett	Liberal	1955–1961
Bob Suggett	Independent Liberal	1961–1964
Bob Suggett	Liberal	1964–1967
Llew Reese	Liberal	1967–1976

== See also ==
- Parliaments of the Australian states and territories
- List of members of the Victorian Legislative Assembly
