= Kevin King (politician) =

Australian politician

Kevin Francis King (11 October 1922 – 28 January 1983) was an Australian politician.

King was born in Yarram to farmer George Edward King and Myrtle Daphne Green. He held a variety of jobs as a young man, and during World War II worked on the Alice Springs-Darwin road for the Commonwealth Construction Corps. He was also a motor mechanics instructor for the Netherlands East Indies Army. From 1945 to 1948 he worked for a sports car company in Brisbane, but he returned to Melbourne in 1948 to work in a store. In 1951 he joined the Labor Party, and that year married Rosalie Szabo, with whom he had a son. He qualified as a woolclasser, working in Victoria and Tasmania until 1961, when he became the manager of a Melbourne wool store.

In 1979 King was elected to the Victorian Legislative Assembly as the Labor member for Springvale. He held the seat until his death at Prahran in 1983.

Victorian Legislative Assembly
Preceded by Norman Billing	Member for Springvale; 1979–1983	Succeeded by Eddie Micallef
