= Llew Reese =

Australian politician (1919–1982)

William Frederick Llewellyn Reese (5 April 1919 – 22 September 1982) was an Australian politician.

He was born at Hamilton, Victoria, to schoolteachers William Reese and Euphemia Clark. He attended a variety of state schools before becoming an accountant, practising from 1937. From 1939 to 1942 he served in the 8th Battalion seconded to the Supply Department. On 19 December 1942, he married Mavis Jean Clark, with whom he had a daughter. From 1952, he was a director of Car Parts Sales Pty Ltd. A member of the Liberal Party, he was elected to the Victorian Legislative Assembly for Moorabbin in 1967. He transferred to Heatherton in 1976, but was defeated in 1979. Reese died, aged 63, at Moorabbin, Melbourne, in 1982.

Victorian Legislative Assembly
Preceded by Bob Suggett	Member for Moorabbin; 1967–1976	Abolished
Preceded by Norman Billing	Member for Heatherton; 1976–1979	Succeeded by Peter Spyker
