= Peter Spyker =

Australian politician

Peter Cornelis Spyker AM (born 7 June 1942) is a Dutch-born Australian politician.

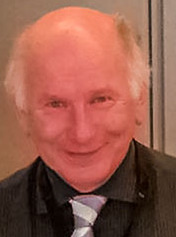

He was born in Amersfoort to baker Peter Cornelis Spyker and Cornelia, a factory worker. He emigrated with his family to Australia in 1953, and attended Bentleigh High School and Sandringham Technical School before becoming a fitter and turner. He worked for Freighter Industries from 1959 to 1974 and Dormans Pty Ltd from 1974 to 1979. He joined the Labor Party in 1963 and was secretary of the Cheltenham branch from 1969 to 1979. He was also an office holder with the Amalgamated Metal Workers and Shipwrights Union.

In 1979 he was elected to the Victorian Legislative Assembly as the member for Heatherton, switching to Mentone in 1985. From May to December 1982 he was Minister of Immigration, before holding the portfolios of Consumer Affairs (1982–87), Ethnic Affairs (1982–88), Property and Services (1987–88), Community Services (1988–90) and Transport (1990–92). His seat was abolished in 1992 and he contested Mordialloc, but he was defeated.

Spyker was made a Member of the Order of Australia (AM) in the 2006 Australia Day Honours for "service to the Victorian Parliament, particularly as a contributor to the development of multicultural affairs policies and as an advocate for consumer rights, health and welfare services, and migrant communities".

Victorian Legislative Assembly
Preceded by Llew Reese	Member for Heatherton; 1979–1985	Abolished
Preceded by Bill Templeton	Member for Mentone; 1985–1992	Abolished
