= Eddie Micallef =

Australian politician

Edward Joseph "Eddie" Micallef (born 1 August 1941) is a former Australian politician.

Micallef was born in Brunswick in Melbourne to Francis Emmanuel Micallef, a tradesman's assistant, and Rita Margaret, née Dali, who worked as a clothing machinist. He attended Catholic schools before studying at the Royal Melbourne Institute of Technology, becoming an apprentice fitter and turner in 1958. He completed his apprenticeship in 1963, becoming a turbine fitter in 1965.

In 1968 Micallef joined the Labor Party, and he became vice-president of the Reservoir branch from 1973 to 1974. In 1983 he was elected to the Victorian Legislative Assembly as the member for Springvale in a by-election. He was promoted to the front bench in 1992, serving as Shadow Minister for Industry Services and also assisting the Shadow Minister for Industrial Relations. Ethnic Affairs was added to his portfolio in 1994, but he stepped down from the front bench in 1997. Micallef lost preselection prior to the 1999 state election and retired from politics.

Victorian Legislative Assembly
Preceded by Kevin King	Member for Springvale; 1983–1999	Succeeded by Tim Holding
