= Norman Billing =

Australian politician

Norman Alexander William Billing (15 January 1913 – 1 November 1989) was an Australian politician.

Billing was born at Port Melbourne to plumber Henry Ernest Billing and Nellie Marquis. He attended state schools at Springvale and Dandenong, and entered the public service in 1928. During World War II he was a sergeant in the Field Ambulance; he was also a cricketer, playing for Prahran and Richmond from 1931 to 1947. From 1953 to 1976 he managed Springvale Community Hospital, and he was also closely involved with St John Ambulance. A member of the Liberal Party, he served on Dandenong Shire Council in 1955, on Springvale and Noble Park Shire Councils from 1955 to 1959 (as president from 1957 to 1958), and on Springvale City Council from 1962 to 1965.

In 1967 Billing was elected to the Victorian Legislative Assembly as the member for Heatherton. He moved seats to Springvale on 20 March 1976 but was defeated on 4 May 1979. Billing died on 1 November 1989.

Victorian Legislative Assembly
New seat	Member for Heatherton; 1967–1976	Succeeded by Llew Reese
New seat	Member for Springvale; 1976–1979	Succeeded by Kevin King
