= Electoral district of Heatherton =

Electoral district in Victoria, Australia

Coordinates: 37°57′S 145°06′E

Heatherton Victoria—Legislative Assembly
- State: Victoria
- Created: 1967
- Abolished: 1985
- Namesake: Suburb of Heatherton

The electoral district of Heatherton was an electoral district of the Legislative Assembly in the Australian state of Victoria.

== Members ==
| Member | Party | Term |
|---|---|---|
| Norman Billing | Liberal | 1967–1976 |
| Llew Reese | Liberal | 1976–1979 |
| Peter Spyker | Labor | 1979–1985 |
