= Electoral district of Reservoir =

Former state electoral district of Victoria, Australia

Coordinates: 37°43′S 145°43′E

Reservoir Victoria—Legislative Assembly
- State: Victoria
- Created: 1955
- Abolished: 1992
- Namesake: Suburb of Reservoir
- Demographic: Metropolitan

Electoral district of Reservoir was an electoral district of the Legislative Assembly in the Australian state of Victoria.

== Members ==
Member	Party	Term
William Ruthven	Labor	1955–1961
Dr Harry Jenkins Sr.	Labor	1961–1969
Jim Simmonds	Labor	1969–1992

== See also ==
- Parliaments of the Australian states and territories
- List of members of the Victorian Legislative Assembly
