= Jim Simmonds =

Australian politician

James Lionel Simmonds (9 October 1926 – 3 March 2007) was an Australian politician.

Simmonds was born in Melbourne to salesman Lionel William Simmonds and Myrtle Evelyn. He attended local state schools and became a toolmaker, with education from Melbourne Technical College. He was also involved in the union movement as a shop steward and branch secretary of the Amalgamated Metal Workers Union. A member of the Labor Party, he was secretary of the Heidelberg West branch and campaign director for the federal seat of Scullin. In 1969 he was elected in a by-election to the Victorian Legislative Assembly as the member for Reservoir. He was Labor spokesman on labour and industry from 1970 to 1982 and on consumer affairs from 1973 to 1977 and from 1981 to 1982. From 1982 to 1985 he was Minister for Employment and Training, moving to Local Government in 1985. He stepped down from the front bench in 1988 and retired from politics in 1992.

Victorian Legislative Assembly
| Preceded by Harry Jenkins | Member for Reservoir; 1969–1992 | Abolished |
