= Electoral district of Springvale =

Electoral district in Australia

Coordinates: 37°57′S 145°09′E

Springvale Victoria—Legislative Assembly
- State: Victoria
- Created: 1976
- Abolished: 2002
- Namesake: Suburb of Springvale
- Demographic: Metropolitan

The electoral district of Springvale was an electoral district of the Legislative Assembly in the Australian state of Victoria. It was replaced in 2002, by the electoral districts of Lyndhurst and Mulgrave.

== Members for Springvale ==
Member	Party	Term
Norman Billing	Liberal	1976–1979
Kevin King	Labor	1979–1983
Eddie Micallef	Labor	1983–1999
Tim Holding	Labor	1999–2002

== See also ==
- Parliaments of the Australian states and territories
- List of members of the Victorian Legislative Assembly
