= Results of the 1958 Victorian state election (Legislative Assembly) =

Australian state election results

Victorian state election, 31 May 1958 Legislative Assembly << 1955–1961 >>
Enrolled voters	1,478,065				
Votes cast	1,392,813		Turnout	94.23	+0.21
Informal votes	24,760		Informal	1.78	-0.42
Summary of votes by party
Party	Primary votes	%	Swing	Seats	Change
Labor	515,638	37.69	+5.12	18	−2
Liberal and Country	508,678	37.18	-0.60	39	+6
Democratic Labor	197,380	14.43	+1.82	0	−1
Country	127,228	9.30	-0.24	9	−2
Independent	17,770	1.30	-2.23	0	−1
Other	1,359	0.10	-0.40	0	±0
Total	1,368,053			66	
Two-party-preferred
Liberal and Country	790,149	57.8	–0.1		
Labor	577,904	42.2	+0.1		

This is a list of electoral district results for the Victorian 1958 election.

== Results by electoral district ==
=== Albert Park ===
1958 Victorian state election: Albert Park
Party	Candidate	Votes	%	±%
Labor	Keith Sutton	8,727	48.9	
Liberal and Country	Roy Schilling	4,411	24.7	
Democratic Labor	Stan Corrigan	4,250	23.8	
Communist	Vida Little	442	2.5	
Total formal votes		17,830	97.4	
Informal votes		480	2.6	
Turnout		18,310	92.3	
Two-party-preferred result
Labor	Keith Sutton	9,703	54.4	
Liberal and Country	Roy Schilling	8,127	45.6	
Labor hold		Swing		

- Two party preferred vote was estimated.

=== Ballarat North ===
1958 Victorian state election: Ballarat North
Party	Candidate	Votes	%	±%
Country	Russell White	7,151	34.3	
Labor	Ronald House	6,192	29.7	
Liberal and Country	Tom Evans	4,233	20.3	
Democratic Labor	James Meere	3,279	15.7	
Total formal votes		20,855	98.6	
Informal votes		304	1.4	
Turnout		21,159	96.3	
Two-party-preferred result
Country	Russell White	13,748	65.9	
Labor	Ronald House	7,107	34.1	
Two-candidate-preferred result
Country	Russell White	13,069	62.7	
Liberal and Country	Tom Evans	7,786	37.3	
Country hold		Swing		

=== Ballarat South ===
1958 Victorian state election: Ballarat South
Party	Candidate	Votes	%	±%
Liberal and Country	Gordon Scott	7,988	39.5	
Labor	Maxwell Pinkard	7,071	35.0	
Democratic Labor	Leslie D'Arcy	3,864	19.1	
Country	Arthur Philips	1,302	6.4	
Total formal votes		20,225	98.2	
Informal votes		377	1.8	
Turnout		20,602	96.2	
Two-party-preferred result
Liberal and Country	Gordon Scott	11,957	59.1	
Labor	Maxwell Pinkard	8,268	40.9	
Liberal and Country hold		Swing		

=== Balwyn ===
1958 Victorian state election: Balwyn
Party	Candidate	Votes	%	±%
Liberal and Country	Alex Taylor	14,351	60.7	
Labor	John MacPherson	5,321	22.5	
Democratic Labor	Leo Erwin	2,459	10.4	
Independent	Frank Block	1,508	6.4	
Total formal votes		23,639	98.6	
Informal votes		331	1.4	
Turnout		23,970	94.0	
Two-party-preferred result
Liberal and Country	Alex Taylor	17,723	75.0	
Labor	John MacPherson	5,916	25.0	
Liberal and Country hold		Swing		

- Two party preferred vote was estimated.

=== Benalla ===
1958 Victorian state election: Benalla
Party	Candidate	Votes	%	±%
Country	Frederick Cook	6,628	34.2	
Labor	Jack Ginifer	5,520	28.5	
Liberal and Country	James Bennison	4,651	24.0	
Democratic Labor	William Mithen	2,604	13.4	
Total formal votes		19,403	99.0	
Informal votes		188	1.0	
Turnout		19,591	94.8	
Two-party-preferred result
Country	Frederick Cook	13,028	67.1	
Labor	Jack Ginifer	6,375	32.9	
Two-candidate-preferred result
Country	Frederick Cook	11,810	60.9	
Liberal and Country	James Bennison	7,593	39.1	
Country hold		Swing		

- Two party preferred vote between Country and Labor was estimated.

=== Benambra ===
1958 Victorian state election: Benambra
Party	Candidate	Votes	%	±%
Country	Tom Mitchell	10,087	50.1	
Labor	Francis Taylor	4,172	20.7	
Democratic Labor	Henry Richards	3,247	16.1	
Liberal and Country	James Shannon	2,612	13.0	
Total formal votes		20,118	98.7	
Informal votes		258	1.3	
Turnout		20,376	94.2	
Two-party-preferred result
Country	Tom Mitchell	15,197	75.6	
Labor	Francis Taylor	4,921	24.4	
Country hold		Swing		

- Two party preferred vote was estimated.

=== Bendigo ===
1958 Victorian state election: Bendigo
Party	Candidate	Votes	%	±%
Labor	Bill Galvin	9,812	47.2	
Liberal and Country	John Stanistreet	5,699	27.4	
Democratic Labor	James Brosnan	2,691	12.9	
Country	William Nicholls	2,571	12.4	
Total formal votes		20,773	98.5	
Informal votes		307	1.5	
Turnout		21,080	96.4	
Two-party-preferred result
Labor	Bill Galvin	10,801	52.0	
Liberal and Country	John Stanistreet	9,972	48.0	
Labor gain from Liberal and Country		Swing		

=== Box Hill ===
1958 Victorian state election: Box Hill
Party	Candidate	Votes	%	±%
Liberal and Country	George Reid	13,013	58.2	
Labor	William Betton	6,774	30.3	
Democratic Labor	Edmund Burgi	2,556	11.4	
Total formal votes		22,343	98.7	
Informal votes		294	1.3	
Turnout		22,637	93.9	
Two-party-preferred result
Liberal and Country	George Reid	15,185	68.0	
Labor	William Betton	7,158	32.0	
Liberal and Country hold		Swing		

- Two party preferred vote was estimated.

=== Brighton ===
1958 Victorian state election: Brighton
Party	Candidate	Votes	%	±%
Liberal and Country	John Rossiter	13,250	67.0	
Labor	Reginald Hayes	6,537	33.0	
Total formal votes		19,787	98.4	
Informal votes		317	1.6	
Turnout		20,104	93.7	
Liberal and Country hold		Swing		

=== Broadmeadows ===
1958 Victorian state election: Broadmeadows
Party	Candidate	Votes	%	±%
Labor	Joseph Smith	13,279	47.0	
Liberal and Country	Harry Kane	10,504	37.2	
Democratic Labor	John Donnellon	4,455	15.8	
Total formal votes		28,238	98.6	
Informal votes		399	1.4	
Turnout		28,637	94.1	
Two-party-preferred result
Liberal and Country	Harry Kane	14,335	50.8	
Labor	Joseph Smith	13,903	49.2	
Liberal and Country hold		Swing		

=== Brunswick East ===
1958 Victorian state election: Brunswick East
Party	Candidate	Votes	%	±%
Labor	Leo Fennessy	9,565	57.9	
Liberal and Country	Bill Burns	3,944	23.9	
Democratic Labor	Allan Swain	3,018	18.3	
Total formal votes		16,527	97.2	
Informal votes		468	2.8	
Turnout		16,995	92.9	
Two-party-preferred result
Labor	Leo Fennessy	10,018	60.6	
Liberal and Country	Bill Burns	6,509	39.4	
Labor hold		Swing		

- Two party preferred vote was estimated.

=== Brunswick West ===
1958 Victorian state election: Brunswick West
Party	Candidate	Votes	%	±%
Labor	Campbell Turnbull	9,813	51.2	
Democratic Labor	Peter Randles	4,709	24.6	
Liberal and Country	Alfred Wall	4,649	24.3	
Total formal votes		19,171	97.6	
Informal votes		465	2.4	
Turnout		19,636	93.8	
Two-party-preferred result
Labor	Campbell Turnbull	10,519	54.9	
Liberal and Country	Alfred Wall	8,652	45.1	
Labor hold		Swing		

- Two party preferred vote was estimated.

=== Burwood ===
1958 Victorian state election: Burwood
Party	Candidate	Votes	%	±%
Liberal and Country	Jim MacDonald	14,125	70.0	
Labor	Vincent Scully	6,040	30.0	
Total formal votes		20,165	98.4	
Informal votes		322	1.6	
Turnout		20,487	94.8	
Liberal and Country hold		Swing		

=== Camberwell ===
1958 Victorian state election: Camberwell
Party	Candidate	Votes	%	±%
Liberal and Country	Vernon Wilcox	11,673	60.4	
Labor	George Blood	5,251	27.2	
Democratic Labor	Leonora Lloyd	2,411	12.5	
Total formal votes		19,335	98.3	
Informal votes		339	1.7	
Turnout		19,674	93.7	
Two-party-preferred result
Liberal and Country	Vernon Wilcox	13,722	72.0	
Labor	George Blood	5,613	28.0	
Liberal and Country hold		Swing		

- Two party preferred vote was estimated.

=== Caulfield ===
1958 Victorian state election: Caulfield
Party	Candidate	Votes	%	±%
Liberal and Country	Alexander Fraser	11,802	59.2	
Labor	Alan Brenton	5,501	27.6	
Democratic Labor	Celia Laird	2,641	13.2	
Total formal votes		19,944	98.5	
Informal votes		312	1.5	
Turnout		20,256	92.4	
Two-party-preferred result
Liberal and Country	Alexander Fraser	14,047	70.5	
Labor	Alan Brenton	5,897	29.5	
Liberal and Country hold		Swing		

- Two party preferred vote was estimated.

=== Coburg ===
1958 Victorian state election: Coburg
Party	Candidate	Votes	%	±%
Labor	Charlie Mutton	12,801	62.4	
Liberal and Country	Peter Robertson	4,623	22.5	
Democratic Labor	Kevin O'Dea	3,078	15.0	
Total formal votes		20,502	98.1	
Informal votes		399	1.9	
Turnout		20,901	95.4	
Two-party-preferred result
Labor	Charlie Mutton	13,263	64.7	
Liberal and Country	Peter Robertson	7,239	35.3	
Labor gain from Independent		Swing	N/A	

- Mutton was elected as an Independent in the 1955 election, but joined the Labor party in 1956.
- Two party preferred vote was estimated.

=== Dandenong ===
1958 Victorian state election: Dandenong
Party	Candidate	Votes	%	±%
Liberal and Country	Len Reid	11,741	43.8	
Labor	Alan Lind	11,177	41.7	
Democratic Labor	Reginald Kearney	3,869	14.4	
Total formal votes		27,278	98.2	
Informal votes		491	1.8	
Turnout		27,278	93.8	
Two-party-preferred result
Liberal and Country	Len Reid	14,326	53.5	
Labor	Alan Lind	12,461	46.5	
Liberal and Country hold		Swing		

=== Dundas ===
1958 Victorian state election: Dundas
Party	Candidate	Votes	%	±%
Liberal and Country	William McDonald	10,142	48.7	
Labor	Bob McClure	8,261	39.6	
Democratic Labor	John Peters	2,439	11.7	
Total formal votes		20,842	99.3	
Informal votes		143	0.7	
Turnout		20,985	96.2	
Two-party-preferred result
Liberal and Country	William McDonald	12,174	58.4	
Labor	Bob McClure	8,668	41.6	
Liberal and Country hold		Swing		

=== Elsternwick ===
1958 Victorian state election: Elsternwick
Party	Candidate	Votes	%	±%
Liberal and Country	Richard Gainey	11,638	58.9	
Labor	George Smith	5,108	25.8	
Democratic Labor	Rex Keane	3,025	15.3	
Total formal votes		19,771	98.2	
Informal votes		358	1.8	
Turnout		20,129	92.8	
Two-party-preferred result
Liberal and Country	Richard Gainey	14,209	71.9	
Labor	George Smith	5,562	28.1	
Liberal and Country hold		Swing		

- Two party preferred vote was estimated.

=== Essendon ===
1958 Victorian state election: Essendon
Party	Candidate	Votes	%	±%
Labor	Arthur Drakeford	9,737	44.9	
Liberal and Country	Kenneth Wheeler	8,270	38.1	
Democratic Labor	Kevin Digby	3,702	17.1	
Total formal votes		21,709	98.4	
Informal votes		343	1.6	
Turnout		22,052	95.7	
Two-party-preferred result
Liberal and Country	Kenneth Wheeler	11,181	51.5	
Labor	Arthur Drakeford	10,528	48.5	
Liberal and Country gain from Labor		Swing		

=== Evelyn ===
1958 Victorian state election: Evelyn
Party	Candidate	Votes	%	±%
Liberal and Country	Russell Stokes	10,376	43.7	
Labor	Phillip Connell	10,304	43.5	
Democratic Labor	Kevin Gould	3,035	12.8	
Total formal votes		23,715	98.5	
Informal votes		371	1.5	
Turnout		24,086	94.4	
Two-party-preferred result
Liberal and Country	Russell Stokes	12,817	54.1	
Labor	Phillip Connell	10,898	45.9	
Liberal and Country gain from Labor		Swing		

=== Fitzroy ===
1958 Victorian state election: Fitzroy
Party	Candidate	Votes	%	±%
Labor	Denis Lovegrove	11,092	64.8	
Democratic Labor	David Woodhouse	3,224	18.9	
Liberal and Country	Charles Gillies	2,793	16.3	
Total formal votes		17,109	96.0	
Informal votes		711	4.0	
Turnout		17,820	91.6	
Two-party-preferred result
Labor	Denis Lovegrove	11,575	67.6	
Liberal and Country	Charles Gillies	5,534	32.4	
Labor hold		Swing		

- Two party preferred vote was estimated.

=== Flemington ===
1958 Victorian state election: Flemington
Party	Candidate	Votes	%	±%
Labor	Kevin Holland	11,328	63.2	
Democratic Labor	Michael McMahon	3,585	20.0	
Liberal and Country	Norman Loader	3,015	16.8	
Total formal votes		17,928	97.8	
Informal votes		403	2.2	
Turnout		18,331	95.2	
Two-party-preferred result
Labor	Kevin Holland	11,865	66.2	
Liberal and Country	Norman Loader	6,063	33.8	
Labor hold		Swing		

- Two party preferred vote was estimated.

=== Footscray ===
1958 Victorian state election: Footscray
Party	Candidate	Votes	%	±%
Labor	Ernie Shepherd	14,843	76.6	
Democratic Labor	Robert Kerr	2,343	12.1	
Liberal and Country	Bryan Tonkin	2,200	11.3	
Total formal votes		19,386	98.0	
Informal votes		404	2.0	
Turnout		19,790	96.0	
Two-party-preferred result
Labor	Ernie Shepherd	15,194	78.4	
Liberal and Country	Bryan Tonkin	4,192	21.6	
Labor hold		Swing		

- Two party preferred vote was estimated.

=== Geelong ===
1958 Victorian state election: Geelong
Party	Candidate	Votes	%	±%
Liberal and Country	Thomas Maltby	8,444	43.4	
Labor	George Poyser	7,371	37.9	
Democratic Labor	George Taylor	2,305	11.9	
Independent	Albert Woodward	1,313	6.8	
Total formal votes		19,433	98.7	
Informal votes		255	1.3	
Turnout		19,688	92.8	
Two-party-preferred result
Liberal and Country	Thomas Maltby	10,954	56.4	
Labor	George Poyser	8,479	43.6	
Liberal and Country hold		Swing		

=== Geelong West ===
1958 Victorian state election: Geelong West
Party	Candidate	Votes	%	±%
Labor	Colin MacDonald	10,107	47.5	
Liberal and Country	Max Gillett	8,388	39.4	
Democratic Labor	James Mahoney	2,797	13.1	
Total formal votes		21,292	98.5	
Informal votes		331	1.5	
Turnout		21,623	93.2	
Two-party-preferred result
Liberal and Country	Max Gillett	10,658	50.1	
Labor	Colin MacDonald	10,634	49.9	
Liberal and Country gain from Labor		Swing		

=== Gippsland East ===
1958 Victorian state election: Gippsland East
Party	Candidate	Votes	%	±%
Country	Albert Lind	11,285	58.2	
Liberal and Country	Rae Archibald	4,465	23.0	
Democratic Labor	Frank Burns	3,650	18.8	
Total formal votes		19,400	98.5	
Informal votes		304	1.5	
Turnout		19,704	94.5	
Two-candidate-preferred result
Country	Albert Lind	13,110	67.6	
Liberal and Country	Rae Archibald	6,290	32.4	
Country hold		Swing		

- Two candidate preferred vote was estimated.

=== Gippsland South ===
1958 Victorian state election: Gippsland South
Party	Candidate	Votes	%	±%
Country	Herbert Hyland	15,600	76.8	
Democratic Labor	John Hansen	4,711	23.2	
Total formal votes		20,311	97.8	
Informal votes		466	2.2	
Turnout		20,777	94.9	
Country hold		Swing		

=== Gippsland West ===
1958 Victorian state election: Gippsland West
Party	Candidate	Votes	%	±%
Country	Leslie Cochrane	8,738	42.5	
Labor	James Longstaff	5,340	26.0	
Liberal and Country	James Hosking	4,050	19.7	
Democratic Labor	Kevin Scanlon	2,437	11.8	
Total formal votes		20,585	98.5	
Informal votes		309	1.5	
Turnout		20,894	95.3	
Two-party-preferred result
Country	Leslie Cochrane	14,502	70.4	
Labor	James Longstaff	6,083	29.6	
Country hold		Swing		

=== Grant ===
1958 Victorian state election: Grant
Party	Candidate	Votes	%	±%
Labor	Roy Crick	16,188	59.3	
Liberal and Country	John Anderson	6,759	24.8	
Democratic Labor	Maxwell Campbell	4,339	15.9	
Total formal votes		27,286	97.7	
Informal votes		636	2.3	
Turnout		27,922	94.6	
Two-party-preferred result
Labor	Roy Crick	16,839	61.7	
Liberal and Country	John Anderson	10,447	38.3	
Labor hold		Swing		

- Two party preferred vote was estimated.

=== Hampden ===
1958 Victorian state election: Hampden
Party	Candidate	Votes	%	±%
Liberal and Country	Henry Bolte	11,648	58.4	
Labor	Fred Levin	5,367	26.9	
Democratic Labor	Leo O'Brien	2,944	14.7	
Total formal votes		19,959	99.1	
Informal votes		175	0.9	
Turnout		20,134	96.6	
Two-party-preferred result
Liberal and Country	Henry Bolte	14,151	70.9	
Labor	Fred Levin	5,808	29.1	
Liberal and Country hold		Swing		

- Two party preferred vote was estimated.

=== Hawthorn ===
1958 Victorian state election: Hawthorn
Party	Candidate	Votes	%	±%
Liberal and Country	Peter Garrisson	7,469	41.2	
Labor	Jack Poke	7,308	40.3	
Democratic Labor	Charles Murphy	3,337	18.4	
Total formal votes		18,114	97.8	
Informal votes		404	2.2	
Turnout		18,518	92.5	
Two-party-preferred result
Liberal and Country	Peter Garrisson	10,295	56.8	
Labor	Jack Poke	7,819	43.2	
Liberal and Country hold		Swing		

=== Ivanhoe ===
1958 Victorian state election: Ivanhoe
Party	Candidate	Votes	%	±%
Liberal and Country	Vernon Christie	10,547	48.2	
Labor	David Walker	8,305	38.0	
Democratic Labor	Cyril Cummins	3,021	13.8	
Total formal votes		21,873	98.7	
Informal votes		289	1.3	
Turnout		22,162	93.7	
Two-party-preferred result
Liberal and Country	Vernon Christie	13,210	60.4	
Labor	David Walker	8,663	39.6	
Liberal and Country hold		Swing		

=== Kara Kara ===
1958 Victorian state election: Kara Kara
Party	Candidate	Votes	%	±%
Liberal and Country	Keith Turnbull	8,007	41.8	
Labor	Cyril Sudholz	5,714	29.9	
Country	Allen Reseigh	3,347	17.5	
Democratic Labor	Gerard Gilders	2,071	10.8	
Total formal votes		19,139	99.0	
Informal votes		199	1.0	
Turnout		19,338	96.8	
Two-party-preferred result
Liberal and Country	Keith Turnbull	12,286	64.2	
Labor	Cyril Sudholz	6,853	35.8	
Liberal and Country hold		Swing		

=== Kew ===
1958 Victorian state election: Kew
Party	Candidate	Votes	%	±%
Liberal and Country	Arthur Rylah	12,375	62.6	
Labor	Kevin Lynch	3,845	19.5	
Democratic Labor	John Buchanan	3,108	15.7	
Communist	Ralph Gibson	425	2.2	
Total formal votes		19,753	98.1	
Informal votes		372	1.9	
Turnout		20,125	92.1	
Two-party-preferred result
Liberal and Country	Arthur Rylah	15,058	76.2	
Labor	Kevin Lynch	4,695	23.8	
Liberal and Country hold		Swing		

- Two party preferred vote was estimated.

=== Lowan ===
1958 Victorian state election: Lowan
Party	Candidate	Votes	%	±%
Liberal and Country	Wilfred Mibus	10,679	54.5	
Country	Ian McCann	5,664	28.9	
Democratic Labor	Edgar McMahon	3,258	16.6	
Total formal votes		19,601	98.7	
Informal votes		257	1.3	
Turnout		19,858	96.4	
Two-candidate-preferred result
Liberal and Country	Wilfred Mibus	12,308	62.8	
Country	Ian McCann	7,293	37.2	
Liberal and Country hold		Swing		

- Two candidate preferred vote was estimated.

=== Malvern ===
1958 Victorian state election: Malvern
Party	Candidate	Votes	%	±%
Liberal and Country	John Bloomfield	12,109	69.5	
Independent	Mascotte Brown	5,306	30.5	
Total formal votes		17,415	95.1	
Informal votes		896	4.9	
Turnout		18,311	91.2	
Liberal and Country hold		Swing		

=== Melbourne ===
1958 Victorian state election: Melbourne
Party	Candidate	Votes	%	±%
Labor	Arthur Clarey	8,129	50.2	
Democratic Labor	Tom Hayes	4,430	27.3	
Liberal and Country	Martha Yuille	3,645	22.5	
Total formal votes		16,804	96.4	
Informal votes		600	3.6	
Turnout		16,804	89.0	
Two-candidate-preferred result
Labor	Arthur Clarey	8,793	54.3	
Liberal and Country	Martha Yuille	7,411	45.7	
Labor hold		Swing		

- Two party preferred vote was estimated.

=== Mentone ===
1958 Victorian state election: Mentone
Party	Candidate	Votes	%	±%
Liberal and Country	Edward Meagher	9,596	43.5	
Labor	Alfred O'Connor	8,776	39.8	
Democratic Labor	George White	3,687	16.7	
Total formal votes		22,059	98.4	
Informal votes		364	1.6	
Turnout		22,423	94.9	
Two-party-preferred result
Liberal and Country	Edward Meagher	12,601	57.1	
Labor	Alfred O'Connor	9,458	42.9	
Liberal and Country hold		Swing		

=== Midlands ===
1958 Victorian state election: Midlands
Party	Candidate	Votes	%	±%
Labor	Clive Stoneham	10,207	48.2	
Liberal and Country	James Mactier	8,103	38.2	
Democratic Labor	John Timberlake	2,877	13.6	
Total formal votes		21,187	99.1	
Informal votes		185	0.9	
Turnout		21,372	94.9	
Two-party-preferred result
Labor	Clive Stoneham	10,848	51.2	
Liberal and Country	James Mactier	10,339	48.4	
Labor hold		Swing		

=== Mildura ===
1958 Victorian state election: Mildura
Party	Candidate	Votes	%	±%
Country	Nathaniel Barclay	11,499	60.6	
Labor	William Nicholas	5,311	28.0	
Democratic Labor	John Cotter	2,174	11.4	
Total formal votes		18,984	98.7	
Informal votes		250	1.3	
Turnout		19,234	95.0	
Two-party-preferred result
Country	Nathaniel Barclay	13,348	70.3	
Labor	William Nicholas	5,636	29.7	
Country hold		Swing		

- Two party preferred vote was estimated.

=== Moonee Ponds ===
1958 Victorian state election: Moonee Ponds
Party	Candidate	Votes	%	±%
Liberal and Country	Jack Holden	8,128	41.9	
Labor	Thomas Moloney	7,306	37.7	
Democratic Labor	Paul Gunn	3,565	18.4	
Independent	Lancelot Hutchinson	379	2.0	
Total formal votes		19,378	98.3	
Informal votes		328	1.7	
Turnout		19,706	94.9	
Two-party-preferred result
Liberal and Country	Jack Holden	11,694	60.4	
Labor	Thomas Moloney	7,684	39.6	
Liberal and Country hold		Swing		

=== Moorabbin ===
1958 Victorian state election: Moorabbin
Party	Candidate	Votes	%	±%
Liberal and Country	Bob Suggett	11,939	48.7	
Labor	Les Coates	9,602	39.2	
Democratic Labor	Desmond Ward	2,966	12.1	
Total formal votes		24,507	98.4	
Informal votes		386	1.6	
Turnout		24,893	95.0	
Two-party-preferred result
Liberal and Country	Bob Suggett	14,552	59.4	
Labor	Les Coates	9,955	40.6	
Liberal and Country hold		Swing		

=== Mornington ===
1958 Victorian state election: Mornington
Party	Candidate	Votes	%	±%
Liberal and Country	Roberts Dunstan	13,728	63.5	
Labor	Gordon Anstee	7,897	36.5	
Total formal votes		21,625	98.4	
Informal votes		341	1.6	
Turnout		21,966	93.0	
Liberal and Country hold		Swing		

=== Morwell ===
1958 Victorian state election: Morwell
Party	Candidate	Votes	%	±%
Labor	Hector Stoddart	8,898	45.2	
Liberal and Country	Jim Balfour	8,223	41.7	
Democratic Labor	Alfred Gerrard	2,587	13.1	
Total formal votes		19,708	98.5	
Informal votes		300	1.5	
Turnout		20,008	94.7	
Two-party-preferred result
Liberal and Country	Jim Balfour	10,379	52.7	
Labor	Hector Stoddart	9,329	47.3	
Liberal and Country hold		Swing		

=== Mulgrave ===
1958 Victorian state election: Mulgrave
Party	Candidate	Votes	%	±%
Liberal and Country	Ray Wiltshire	14,776	49.9	
Labor	John Neal	10,957	37.0	
Democratic Labor	Leo Sparrow	3,884	13.1	
Total formal votes		29,617	98.4	
Informal votes		489	1.6	
Turnout		30,106	94.5	
Two-party-preferred result
Liberal and Country	Ray Wiltshire	17,906	60.5	
Labor	John Neal	11,711	39.5	
Liberal and Country hold		Swing		

=== Murray Valley ===
1958 Victorian state election: Murray Valley
Party	Candidate	Votes	%	±%
Country	George Moss	12,036	58.8	
Labor	Neil Frankland	5,471	26.7	
Democratic Labor	John Patterson	2,974	14.5	
Total formal votes		20,481	98.3	
Informal votes		345	1.7	
Turnout		20,826	95.1	
Two-party-preferred result
Country	George Moss	14,564	71.1	
Labor	Neil Frankland	5,917	28.9	
Country hold		Swing		

- Two party preferred vote was estimated.

=== Northcote ===
1958 Victorian state election: Northcote
Party	Candidate	Votes	%	±%
Labor	Frank Wilkes	11,980	59.9	
Democratic Labor	Thomas Walsh	4,631	23.1	
Liberal and Country	Edward Wells	3,394	17.0	
Total formal votes		20,005	98.0	
Informal votes		414	2.0	
Turnout		20,419	94.0	
Two-candidate-preferred result
Labor	Frank Wilkes	12,674	63.3	
Liberal and Country	Edward Wells	7,331	36.7	
Labor hold		Swing		

- Two party preferred vote was estimated.

=== Oakleigh ===
1958 Victorian state election: Oakleigh
Party	Candidate	Votes	%	±%
Labor	Val Doube	10,694	50.0	
Liberal and Country	William Downard	8,243	38.6	
Democratic Labor	John Heffernan	2,436	11.4	
Total formal votes		21,373	98.8	
Informal votes		264	1.2	
Turnout		21,637	95.5	
Two-party-preferred result
Labor	Val Doube	11,060	51.7	
Liberal and Country	William Downard	10,313	48.3	
Labor hold		Swing		

- Two party preferred vote was estimated.

=== Ormond ===
1958 Victorian state election: Ormond
Party	Candidate	Votes	%	±%
Liberal and Country	Joe Rafferty	11,252	49.5	
Labor	Robert Flanagan	7,686	38.8	
Democratic Labor	Robert Semmel	3,435	15.1	
Independent	Gilbert Smith	342	1.5	
Total formal votes		22,758	98.3	
Informal votes		342	1.7	
Turnout		23,100	95.4	
Two-party-preferred result
Liberal and Country	Joe Rafferty	14,559	64.1	
Labor	Robert Flanagan	8,156	35.9	
Liberal and Country hold		Swing		

=== Polwarth ===
1958 Victorian state election: Polwarth
Party	Candidate	Votes	%	±%
Liberal and Country	Tom Darcy	8,807	40.5	
Labor	William King	5,160	23.7	
Country	Ronald McDonough	5,086	23.4	
Democratic Labor	Michael Finlay	2,702	12.4	
Total formal votes		21,755	98.9	
Informal votes		249	1.1	
Turnout		22,004	95.7	
Two-party-preferred result
Liberal and Country	Tom Darcy	15,793	72.6	
Labor	William King	5,962	27.4	
Liberal and Country hold		Swing		

- Two party preferred vote was estimated.

=== Portland ===
1958 Victorian state election: Portland
Party	Candidate	Votes	%	±%
Liberal and Country	George Gibbs	9,741	46.4	
Labor	Malcolm Gladman	7,781	37.0	
Democratic Labor	John Russell	3,482	16.6	
Total formal votes		21,004	99.3	
Informal votes		155	0.7	
Turnout		21,159	96.1	
Two-party-preferred result
Liberal and Country	George Gibbs	12,603	60.0	
Labor	Malcolm Gladman	8,401	40.0	
Liberal and Country hold		Swing		

=== Prahran ===
1958 Victorian state election: Prahran
Party	Candidate	Votes	%	±%
Liberal and Country	Sam Loxton	7,798	43.7	
Labor	Robert Pettiona	7,734	43.3	
Democratic Labor	Gordon Haberman	2,325	13.0	
Total formal votes		17,857	97.9	
Informal votes		375	2.1	
Turnout		18,232	92.2	
Two-party-preferred result
Liberal and Country	Sam Loxton	9,794	54.9	
Labor	Robert Pettiona	8,063	45.1	
Liberal and Country hold		Swing		

=== Preston ===
1958 Victorian state election: Preston
Party	Candidate	Votes	%	±%
Labor	Charlie Ring	13,014	54.1	
Democratic Labor	Michael Lucy	5,708	23.7	
Liberal and Country	Neville Crocker	5,355	22.2	
Total formal votes		24,077	97.8	
Informal votes		534	2.2	
Turnout		24,611	94.8	
Two-party-preferred result
Labor	Charlie Ring	13,870	57.6	
Liberal and Country	Neville Crocker	10,207	42.4	
Labor hold		Swing		

- Two party preferred vote was estimated.

=== Reservoir ===
1958 Victorian state election: Reservoir
Party	Candidate	Votes	%	±%
Labor	William Ruthven	14,043	59.7	
Liberal and Country	Hubert Joelson	5,806	24.7	
Democratic Labor	Frederick Whitling	3,690	15.7	
Total formal votes		23,539	98.2	
Informal votes		428	1.8	
Turnout		23,967	95.2	
Two-party-preferred result
Labor	William Ruthven	14,596	62.0	
Liberal and Country	Hubert Joelson	8,943	38.0	
Labor hold		Swing		

- Two party preferred vote was estimated.

=== Richmond ===
1958 Victorian state election: Richmond
Party	Candidate	Votes	%	±%
Labor	Bill Towers	9,552	53.9	
Democratic Labor	Frank Scully	6,242	35.2	
Liberal and Country	Nicholas Renton	1,932	10.9	
Total formal votes		18,259	93.2	
Informal votes		533	2.9	
Turnout		18,259	93.2	
Two-candidate-preferred result
Labor	Bill Towers	10,488	59.2	
Democratic Labor	Frank Scully	7,238	40.8	
Labor gain from Democratic Labor		Swing		

- Two candidate preferred vote was estimated.

=== Ringwood ===
1958 Victorian state election: Ringwood
Party	Candidate	Votes	%	±%
Liberal and Country	Jim Manson	13,021	49.6	
Labor	William Webber	10,316	39.3	
Democratic Labor	Bruce Burne	2,917	11.1	
Total formal votes		26,244	98.7	
Informal votes		351	1.3	
Turnout		26,595	94.7	
Two-party-preferred result
Liberal and Country	Jim Manson	15,551	59.2	
Labor	William Webber	10,703	40.8	
Liberal and Country hold		Swing		

=== Ripponlea ===
1958 Victorian state election: Ripponlea
Party	Candidate	Votes	%	±%
Liberal and Country	Edgar Tanner	9,015	50.1	
Labor	Jack Kagan	6,250	34.7	
Democratic Labor	Dermot O'Neill	2,742	15.2	
Total formal votes		18,007	97.1	
Informal votes		536	2.9	
Turnout		536	2.9	
Two-party-preferred result
Liberal and Country	Edgar Tanner	11,346	63.0	
Labor	Jack Kagan	6,661	37.0	
Liberal and Country hold		Swing		

- Two party preferred vote was estimated.

=== Rodney ===
1958 Victorian state election: Rodney
Party	Candidate	Votes	%	±%
Country	Richard Brose	13,832	68.5	
Democratic Labor	Spencer Broom	6,371	31.5	
Total formal votes		20,203	97.9	
Informal votes		442	2.1	
Turnout		20,645	95.8	
Country hold		Swing		

=== St Kilda ===
1958 Victorian state election: St Kilda
Party	Candidate	Votes	%	±%
Liberal and Country	Baron Snider	8,312	46.9	
Labor	Paul Fraser	6,923	39.1	
Democratic Labor	John Hughes	2,484	14.0	
Total formal votes		17,719	97.1	
Informal votes		535	2.9	
Turnout		18,254	90.4	
Two-party-preferred result
Liberal and Country	Baron Snider	10,237	57.8	
Labor	Paul Fraser	7,482	42.2	
Liberal and Country hold		Swing		

=== Sandringham ===
1958 Victorian state election: Sandringham
Party	Candidate	Votes	%	±%
Liberal and Country	Murray Porter	12,251	52.4	
Labor	Henry Fowler	8,292	35.4	
Democratic Labor	Thomas Ryan	2,856	12.2	
Total formal votes		23,399	98.6	
Informal votes		324	1.4	
Turnout		23,723	94.0	
Two-party-preferred result
Liberal and Country	Murray Porter	14,678	62.7	
Labor	Henry Fowler	8,721	37.3	
Liberal and Country hold		Swing		

- Two party preferred vote was estimated.

=== Scoresby ===
1958 Victorian state election: Scoresby
Party	Candidate	Votes	%	±%
Liberal and Country	George Knox	13,677	57.7	
Labor	Reginald Robertson	7,701	32.5	
Democratic Labor	George Noone	2,330	9.8	
Total formal votes		23,708	98.6	
Informal votes		344	1.4	
Turnout		24,052	93.2	
Two-party-preferred result
Liberal and Country	George Knox	15,657	66.1	
Labor	Reginald Robertson	8,051	33.9	
Liberal and Country hold		Swing		

- Two party preferred vote was estimated.

=== Swan Hill ===
1958 Victorian state election: Swan Hill
Party	Candidate	Votes	%	±%
Country	Harold Stirling	12,402	67.4	
Independent	John Hipworth	6,006	32.6	
Total formal votes		18,408	97.9	
Informal votes		399	2.1	
Turnout		18,807	95.3	
Country hold		Swing		

=== Toorak ===
1958 Victorian state election: Toorak
Party	Candidate	Votes	%	±%
Liberal and Country	Horace Petty	10,664	61.5	
Labor	George Gahan	6,682	38.5	
Total formal votes		17,346	98.0	
Informal votes		399	2.1	
Turnout		18,807	95.3	
Liberal and Country hold		Swing		

=== Williamstown ===
1958 Victorian state election: Williamstown
Party	Candidate	Votes	%	±%
Labor	Larry Floyd	12,734	68.5	
Liberal and Country	Joy Head	2,728	14.7	
Democratic Labor	Edward Purchase	2,641	14.2	
Communist	William Tregear	492	2.7	
Total formal votes		18,595	97.9	
Informal votes		403	2.1	
Turnout		18,998	94.5	
Two-party-preferred result
Labor	Larry Floyd	13,573	73.0	
Liberal and Country	Joy Head	5,022	27.0	
Labor hold		Swing		

- Two party preferred vote was estimated.

=== Yarraville ===
1958 Victorian state election: Yarraville
Party	Candidate	Votes	%	±%
Labor	Roy Schintler	12,751	62.7	
Independent	William Keily	2,916	14.3	
Democratic Labor	James Eudey	2,782	13.7	
Liberal and Country	William Lovell	1,901	9.3	
Total formal votes		20,350	97.7	
Informal votes		484	2.3	
Turnout		20,834	95.2	
Two-party-preferred result
Labor	Roy Schintler	15,792	77.6	
Liberal and Country	William Lovell	4,558	22.4	
Labor hold		Swing		

- Two party preferred vote was estimated.

== See also ==
- 1958 Victorian state election
- Members of the Victorian Legislative Assembly, 1958–1961
