= Results of the 1955 Victorian state election (Legislative Assembly) =

Australian state election results

Victorian state election, 28 May 1955 Legislative Assembly << 1952–1958 >>
Enrolled voters	1,402,588				
Votes cast	1,318,934		Turnout	94.02	+0.44
Informal votes	28,955		Informal	2.19	+0.38
Summary of votes by party
Party	Primary votes	%	Swing	Seats	Change
Liberal and Country	487,408	37.78	+12.93	33	+22
Labor	420,197	37.57	−16.50	20	−17
Labor (A-C)	162,660	12.61	+12.61	1	+1
Country	122,999	9.53	+1.19	11	−1
Independent	45,570	3.53	−3.38	1	±0
Victorian Liberal	44,692	3.46	−6.13	0	−4
Communist	4,589	0.35	−0.88	0	±0
Henry George Justice	1,864	0.14	+0.14	0	±0
Total	1,318,934			66	
Two-party-preferred
Liberal and Country	755,917	57.9	+14.6		
Labor	549,233	42.1	–14.6		

This is a list of electoral district results for the Victorian 1955 election.

== Results by electoral district ==
=== Albert Park ===
1955 Victorian state election: Albert Park
Party	Candidate	Votes	%	±%
Labor	Keith Sutton	7,379	47.6	
Liberal and Country	Thomas Merrett	4,542	29.3	
Labor (A-C)	Albert Jones	3,569	23.1	
Total formal votes		15,490	97.7	
Informal votes		363	2.3	
Turnout		15,853	91.1	
Two-party-preferred result
Labor	Keith Sutton	7,867	50.8	
Liberal and Country	Thomas Merrett	7,623	49.2	
Labor hold		Swing		

=== Ascot Vale ===
1955 Victorian state election: Ascot Vale
Party	Candidate	Votes	%	±%
Labor	Ernie Shepherd	14,351	66.4	
Liberal and Country	George Evans	4,091	18.9	
Labor (A-C)	Paul Gunn	3,168	14.7	
Total formal votes		21,610	98.2	
Informal votes		399	1.8	
Turnout		22,009	94.9	
Two-party-preferred result
Labor	Ernie Shepherd	14,826	68.6	
Liberal and Country	George Evans	6,784	31.4	
Labor hold		Swing		

=== Ballarat North ===
1955 Victorian state election: Ballarat North
Party	Candidate	Votes	%	±%
Country	Russell White	7,405	37.9	
Labor	Jack Smethurst	4,840	24.8	
Labor (A-C)	Thomas Lane	3,996	20.4	
Liberal and Country	Arthur Nicholson	3,305	16.9	
Total formal votes		19,546	98.4	
Informal votes		313	1.6	
Turnout		19,859	96.4	
Two-party-preferred result
Country	Russell White	13,927	71.2	
Labor	Jack Smethurst	5,619	28.8	
Country hold		Swing		

=== Ballarat South ===
1955 Victorian state election: Ballarat South
Party	Candidate	Votes	%	±%
Labor	John Sheehan	8,317	42.8	
Liberal and Country	Gordon Scott	7,883	40.5	
Labor (A-C)	Alfred Purdue	3,249	16.7	
Total formal votes		19,449	98.6	
Informal votes		267	1.4	
Turnout		19,716	96.1	
Two-party-preferred result
Liberal and Country	Gordon Scott	10,506	54.0	
Labor	John Sheehan	8,943	46.0	
Liberal and Country gain from Labor		Swing		

=== Balwyn ===
1955 Victorian state election: Balwyn
Party	Candidate	Votes	%	±%
Liberal and Country	Alex Taylor	14,842	69.9	
Labor	Florence Rodan	6,394	30.1	
Total formal votes		21,236	98.8	
Informal votes		261	1.2	
Turnout		21,497	93.7	
Liberal and Country hold		Swing		

=== Benalla ===
1955 Victorian state election: Benalla
Party	Candidate	Votes	%	±%
Country	Frederick Cook	7,589	38.8	
Labor (A-C)	Ernest Straughair	6,028	30.8	
Liberal and Country	Jack Pennington	5,949	30.4	
Total formal votes		19,566	97.9	
Informal votes		423	2.1	
Turnout		19,989	94.7	
Two-candidate-preferred result
Country	Frederick Cook	12,804	65.4	
Labor (A-C)	Ernest Straughair	6,762	34.6	
Country hold		Swing		

=== Benambra ===
1955 Victorian state election: Benambra
Party	Candidate	Votes	%	±%
Country	Tom Mitchell	7,595	40.3	
Liberal and Country	Norman Attree	4,734	25.1	
Labor (A-C)	William Findlay	4,140	22.0	
Independent Country	James Prendergast	2,383	12.7	
Total formal votes		18,852	98.3	
Informal votes		329	1.7	
Turnout		19,181	93.9	
Two-candidate-preferred result
Country	Tom Mitchell	9,803	52.0	
Liberal and Country	Norman Attree	9,049	48.0	
Country hold		Swing		

=== Bendigo ===
1955 Victorian state election: Bendigo
Party	Candidate	Votes	%	±%
Labor	Bill Galvin	8,955	44.4	
Liberal and Country	John Stanistreet	5,627	27.9	
Labor (A-C)	Arthur Cook	3,036	15.0	
Country	Norman Oliver	2,564	12.7	
Total formal votes		20,182	98.5	
Informal votes		315	1.5	
Turnout		20,497	96.2	
Two-party-preferred result
Liberal and Country	John Stanistreet	10,097	50.03	
Labor	Bill Galvin	10,085	49.97	
Liberal and Country gain from Labor		Swing		

=== Box Hill ===
1955 Victorian state election: Box Hill
Party	Candidate	Votes	%	±%
Liberal and Country	George Reid	13,073	45.9	
Labor	Bob Gray	9,969	35.0	
Independent	Leslie McCredden	2,854	10.0	
Labor (A-C)	Maurice Weston	1,986	7.0	
Henry George Justice	Leslie Bawden	624	2.2	
Total formal votes		28,506	97.7	
Informal votes		668	2.3	
Turnout		29,174	94.0	
Two-party-preferred result
Liberal and Country	George Reid	16,166	56.7	
Labor	Bob Gray	12,340	43.3	
Liberal and Country gain from Labor		Swing		

=== Brighton ===
1955 Victorian state election: Brighton
Party	Candidate	Votes	%	±%
Liberal and Country	John Rossiter	9,363	53.3	
Victorian Liberal	Ray Tovell	4,947	28.1	
Independent Labor	Marcella Sullivan	3,269	18.6	
Total formal votes		17,579	98.1	
Informal votes		347	1.9	
Turnout		17,926	92.7	
Two-candidate-preferred result
Liberal and Country	John Rossiter	10,998	62.6	
Victorian Liberal	Ray Tovell	6,581	37.4	
Liberal and Country gain from Victorian Liberal		Swing		

=== Broadmeadows ===
1955 Victorian state election: Broadmeadows
Party	Candidate	Votes	%	±%
Labor	Joseph Smith	11,043	42.9	
Liberal and Country	Harry Kane	9,572	37.1	
Country	James Webster	5,156	20.0	
Total formal votes		25,771	98.5	
Informal votes		394	1.5	
Turnout		26,165	94.0	
Two-party-preferred result
Liberal and Country	Harry Kane	13,485	52.3	
Labor	Joseph Smith	12,286	47.7	
Liberal and Country gain from Labor		Swing		

=== Brunswick East ===
1955 Victorian state election: Brunswick East
Party	Candidate	Votes	%	±%
Labor	Leo Fennessy	9,277	54.9	
Liberal and Country	Alfred Wall	4,141	24.5	
Labor (A-C)	Joseph O'Carroll	3,492	20.7	
Total formal votes		16,910	97.5	
Informal votes		431	2.5	
Turnout		17,341	93.2	
Two-party-preferred result
Labor	Leo Fennessy	9,801	58.0	
Liberal and Country	Alfred Wall	7,109	42.0	
Labor hold		Swing		

=== Brunswick West ===
1955 Victorian state election: Brunswick West
Party	Candidate	Votes	%	±%
Labor	Campbell Turnbull	6,917	44.8	
Labor (A-C)	Peter Randles	4,455	28.9	
Liberal and Country	Alisa Gaston	4,060	26.3	
Total formal votes		15,432	98.0	
Informal votes		315	2.0	
Turnout		15,747	94.6	
Two-candidate-preferred result
Labor	Campbell Turnbull	7,757	50.3	
Labor (A-C)	Peter Randles	7,675	49.7	
Labor hold		Swing		

=== Burwood ===
1955 Victorian state election: Burwood
Party	Candidate	Votes	%	±%
Liberal and Country	Jim MacDonald	12,190	62.1	
Labor	Gwendolyn Noad	4,965	25.3	
Labor (A-C)	William Mahoney	1,954	9.9	
Henry George Justice	Ivan Robinson	530	2.7	
Total formal votes		19,639	98.3	
Informal votes		334	1.7	
Turnout		19,973	93.8	
Two-party-preferred result
Liberal and Country	Jim MacDonald	14,117	71.9	
Labor	Gwendolyn Noad	5,522	28.1	
Liberal and Country hold		Swing		

=== Camberwell ===
1955 Victorian state election: Camberwell
Party	Candidate	Votes	%	±%
Liberal and Country	Robert Whately	13,369	67.0	
Labor	Barry Jones	6,595	33.0	
Total formal votes		19,964	98.3	
Informal votes		336	1.7	
Turnout		20,300	92.9	
Liberal and Country hold		Swing		

=== Carlton ===
1955 Victorian state election: Carlton
Party	Candidate	Votes	%	±%
Labor	Denis Lovegrove	7,141	49.2	
Labor (A-C)	Bill Barry	4,809	33.1	
Liberal and Country	Francis Michaelson	1,998	13.8	
Communist	John Prescott	568	3.9	
Total formal votes		14,516	93.7	
Informal votes		975	6.3	
Turnout		15,491	91.1	
Two-candidate-preferred result
Labor	Denis Lovegrove	8,091	55.7	
Labor (A-C)	Bill Barry	6,425	44.3	
Labor hold		Swing		

=== Caulfield ===
1955 Victorian state election: Caulfield
Party	Candidate	Votes	%	±%
Liberal and Country	Joe Rafferty	8,505	54.4	
Victorian Liberal	Alexander Dennett	7,133	45.6	
Total formal votes		15,638	94.6	
Informal votes		900	5.4	
Turnout		16,538	90.8	
Liberal and Country gain from Victorian Liberal		Swing		

=== Caulfield East ===
1955 Victorian state election: Caulfield East
Party	Candidate	Votes	%	±%
Liberal and Country	Alexander Fraser	12,165	58.1	
Labor	Robert Flanagan	5,773	27.6	
Labor (A-C)	Bernard Tarpey	3,011	14.4	
Total formal votes		20,949	98.3	
Informal votes		353	1.7	
Turnout		21,302	93.5	
Two-party-preferred result
Liberal and Country	Alexander Fraser	14,725	70.3	
Labor	Robert Flanagan	6,224	29.7	
Liberal and Country hold		Swing		

=== Coburg ===
1955 Victorian state election: Coburg
Party	Candidate	Votes	%	±%
Progressive Labor	Charlie Mutton	11,809	53.2	
Liberal and Country	Donald Abernethy	5,711	25.7	
Labor (A-C)	Kevin Hayes	4,665	21.0	
Total formal votes		22,185	98.2	
Informal votes		415	1.8	
Turnout		22,600	94.8	
Two-candidate-preferred result
Progressive Labor	Charlie Mutton	12,975	58.5	
Liberal and Country	Donald Abernethy	9,210	41.5	
Progressive Labor hold		Swing		

=== Collingwood ===
1955 Victorian state election: Collingwood
Party	Candidate	Votes	%	±%
Labor	Bill Towers	8,906	63.4	
Labor (A-C)	William Livy	3,399	24.2	
Liberal and Country	Martha Yuille	1,746	12.4	
Total formal votes		14,051	97.8	
Informal votes		318	2.2	
Turnout		14,369	93.6	
Two-candidate-preferred result
Labor	Bill Towers	9,343	66.5	
Labor (A-C)	William Livy	4,708	33.5	
Labor hold		Swing		

=== Dandenong ===
1955 Victorian state election: Dandenong
Party	Candidate	Votes	%	±%
Liberal and Country	Ray Wiltshire	16,130	47.7	
Labor	John Tripovich	12,678	37.5	
Labor (A-C)	Reginald Kearney	4,997	14.8	
Total formal votes		33,805	98.2	
Informal votes		604	1.8	
Turnout		34,409	94.3	
Two-party-preferred result
Liberal and Country	Ray Wiltshire	19,651	58.1	
Labor	John Tripovich	14,154	41.9	
Liberal and Country gain from Labor		Swing		

=== Dundas ===
1955 Victorian state election: Dundas
Party	Candidate	Votes	%	±%
Labor	Bob McClure	7,238	39.7	
Liberal and Country	William McDonald	7,093	38.9	
Country	John O'Brien	2,024	11.1	
Labor (A-C)	John Peters	1,895	10.4	
Total formal votes		18,250	98.6	
Informal votes		264	1.4	
Turnout		18,514	96.7	
Two-party-preferred result
Liberal and Country	William McDonald	10,393	56.9	
Labor	Bob McClure	7,857	43.1	
Liberal and Country gain from Labor		Swing		

=== Elsternwick ===
1955 Victorian state election: Elsternwick
Party	Candidate	Votes	%	±%
Victorian Liberal	John Don	8,401	43.5	
Liberal and Country	Richard Gainey	6,918	35.8	
Independent Labor	Donald Tottey	4,002	20.7	
Total formal votes		19,321	97.6	
Informal votes		477	2.4	
Turnout		19,798	93.5	
Two-candidate-preferred result
Liberal and Country	Richard Gainey	9,950	51.5	
Victorian Liberal	John Don	9,371	48.5	
Liberal and Country gain from Victorian Liberal		Swing		

=== Evelyn ===
1955 Victorian state election: Evelyn
Party	Candidate	Votes	%	±%
Labor	Phillip Connell	11,519	38.9	
Liberal and Country	Arthur Ireland	11,070	37.3	
Labor (A-C)	Michael Lucy	7,048	23.8	
Total formal votes		29,637	98.2	
Informal votes		544	1.8	
Turnout		30,181	94.2	
Two-party-preferred result
Labor	Phillip Connell	16,212	54.7	
Liberal and Country	Arthur Ireland	13,425	45.3	
Labor hold		Swing		

=== Flemington ===
1955 Victorian state election: Flemington
Party	Candidate	Votes	%	±%
Labor	Jack Holland	9,376	63.3	
Labor (A-C)	John Hayes	5,443	36.7	
Total formal votes		14,819	96.0	
Informal votes		611	4.0	
Turnout		15,430	91.9	
Labor hold		Swing		

=== Footscray ===
1955 Victorian state election: Footscray
Party	Candidate	Votes	%	±%
Labor	Roy Schintler	11,316	61.2	
Liberal and Country	George Punshon	3,725	20.1	
Labor (A-C)	William Lloyd	3,463	18.7	
Total formal votes		18,504	98.1	
Informal votes		350	1.9	
Turnout		18,854	95.1	
Two-party-preferred result
Labor	Roy Schintler	11,835	64.0	
Liberal and Country	George Punshon	6,669	36.0	
Labor hold		Swing		

=== Geelong ===
1955 Victorian state election: Geelong
Party	Candidate	Votes	%	±%
Liberal and Country	Thomas Maltby	11,172	51.5	
Labor	George Poyser	8,069	37.2	
Independent	Norman Mackay	1,358	6.3	
Victorian Liberal	Charles Plummer	1,081	5.0	
Total formal votes		21,680	98.0	
Informal votes		436	2.0	
Turnout		22,116	93.7	
Two-party-preferred result
Liberal and Country	Thomas Maltby	13,367	61.7	
Labor	George Poyser	8,313	38.3	
Liberal and Country gain from Labor		Swing		

=== Geelong West ===
1955 Victorian state election: Geelong West
Party	Candidate	Votes	%	±%
Liberal and Country	Geoffrey Thom	8,237	38.2	
Labor	Colin MacDonald	6,921	32.1	
Independent	James Dunn	2,720	12.6	
Labor (A-C)	James Mahoney	2,359	10.9	
Independent	James Dowsett	1,315	6.1	
Total formal votes		21,552	97.4	
Informal votes		585	2.6	
Turnout		22,137	93.4	
Two-party-preferred result
Labor	Colin MacDonald	11,589	53.8	
Liberal and Country	Geoffrey Thom	9,963	46.2	
Labor hold		Swing		

=== Gippsland East ===
1955 Victorian state election: Gippsland East
Party	Candidate	Votes	%	±%
Country	Albert Lind	13,084	75.2	
Labor (A-C)	Frank Burns	4,323	24.8	
Total formal votes		17,407	98.3	
Informal votes		308	1.7	
Turnout		17,715	92.5	
Country hold		Swing		

=== Gippsland South ===
1955 Victorian state election: Gippsland South
Party	Candidate	Votes	%	±%
Country	Herbert Hyland	unopposed		
Country hold		Swing		

=== Gippsland West ===
1955 Victorian state election: Gippsland West
Party	Candidate	Votes	%	±%
Country	Leslie Cochrane	12,419	58.9	
Liberal and Country	Colin Ferres	6,938	32.9	
Communist	Walter Doig	1,716	8.2	
Total formal votes		21,073	97.4	
Informal votes		552	2.6	
Turnout		21,625	94.5	
Two-candidate-preferred result
Country	Leslie Cochrane	13,277	63.0	
Liberal and Country	Colin Ferres	7,796	37.0	
Country hold		Swing		

=== Grant ===
1955 Victorian state election: Grant
Party	Candidate	Votes	%	±%
Labor	Roy Crick	14,185	51.5	
Liberal and Country	Max Gillett	8,104	29.4	
Labor (A-C)	Leslie D'Arcy	5,275	19.1	
Total formal votes		27,564	98.0	
Informal votes		556	2.0	
Turnout		28,120	94.1	
Two-party-preferred result
Labor	Roy Crick	14,975	54.3	
Liberal and Country	Max Gillett	12,589	45.7	
Labor hold		Swing		

=== Hampden ===
1955 Victorian state election: Hampden
Party	Candidate	Votes	%	±%
Liberal and Country	Henry Bolte	10,968	58.7	
Labor	Ernie Morton	7,703	41.3	
Total formal votes		18,671	98.8	
Informal votes		231	1.2	
Turnout		18,902	96.2	
Liberal and Country hold		Swing		

=== Hawthorn ===
1955 Victorian state election: Hawthorn
Party	Candidate	Votes	%	±%
Liberal and Country	Jim Manson	7,247	44.2	
Labor	Jack Poke	5,097	31.1	
Labor (A-C)	Charles Murphy	3,739	22.8	
Henry George Justice	William Pitt	313	1.9	
Total formal votes		16,396	97.7	
Informal votes		390	2.3	
Turnout		16,786	94.7	
Two-party-preferred result
Liberal and Country	Jim Manson	8,518	52.0	
Labor	Jack Poke	7,878	48.0	
Liberal and Country gain from Labor		Swing		

=== Ivanhoe ===
1955 Victorian state election: Ivanhoe
Party	Candidate	Votes	%	±%
Liberal and Country	Vernon Christie	9,014	50.4	
Labor	David Walker	6,420	35.9	
Labor (A-C)	John O'Dwyer	2,447	13.7	
Total formal votes		17,881	98.7	
Informal votes		237	1.3	
Turnout		18,118	94.0	
Two-party-preferred result
Liberal and Country	Vernon Christie	11,093	62.0	
Labor	David Walker	6,788	38.0	
Liberal and Country gain from Labor		Swing		

=== Kara Kara ===
1955 Victorian state election: Kara Kara
Party	Candidate	Votes	%	±%
Liberal and Country	Keith Turnbull	9,233	54.8	
Country	Ian McCann	7,605	45.2	
Total formal votes		16,838	97.1	
Informal votes		509	2.9	
Turnout		17,347	95.9	
Liberal and Country hold		Swing		

=== Kew ===
1955 Victorian state election: Kew
Party	Candidate	Votes	%	±%
Liberal and Country	Arthur Rylah	14,152	71.6	
Labor	Norman Williams	4,883	24.7	
Communist	Ralph Gibson	731	3.7	
Total formal votes		19,766	98.0	
Informal votes		401	2.0	
Turnout		20,167	91.4	
Two-party-preferred result
Liberal and Country	Arthur Rylah	14,225	72.0	
Labor	Norman Williams	5,541	28.0	
Liberal and Country hold		Swing		

=== Lowan ===
1955 Victorian state election: Lowan
Party	Candidate	Votes	%	±%
Liberal and Country	Wilfred Mibus	11,546	68.1	
Country	Griffith Perkins	5,418	31.9	
Total formal votes		16,964	98.2	
Informal votes		316	1.8	
Turnout		17,280	96.3	
Liberal and Country hold		Swing		

=== Malvern ===
1955 Victorian state election: Malvern
Party	Candidate	Votes	%	±%
Liberal and Country	John Bloomfield	11,440	70.5	
Victorian Liberal	Mascotte Brown	4,796	29.5	
Total formal votes		16,236	95.4	
Informal votes		779	4.6	
Turnout		17,015	91.1	
Liberal and Country hold		Swing		

=== Melbourne ===
1955 Victorian state election: Melbourne
Party	Candidate	Votes	%	±%
Labor	Arthur Clarey	6,913	48.9	
Liberal and Country	Alan Etherington	3,703	26.2	
Labor (A-C)	Tom Hayes	3,520	24.9	
Total formal votes		14,136	95.9	
Informal votes		597	4.1	
Turnout		14,733	90.0	
Two-party-preferred result
Labor	Arthur Clarey	9,132	64.6	
Liberal and Country	Alan Etherington	5,004	35.4	
Labor hold		Swing		

=== Mentone ===
1955 Victorian state election: Mentone
Party	Candidate	Votes	%	±%
Liberal and Country	Edward Meagher	10,198	42.8	
Labor	Alfred O'Connor	8,259	34.7	
Labor (A-C)	George White	5,356	22.5	
Total formal votes		23,813	98.0	
Informal votes		475	2.0	
Turnout		24,288	94.5	
Two-party-preferred result
Liberal and Country	Edward Meagher	13,982	58.7	
Labor	Alfred O'Connor	9,431	41.3	
Liberal and Country gain from Labor		Swing		

=== Midlands ===
1955 Victorian state election: Midlands
Party	Candidate	Votes	%	±%
Labor	Clive Stoneham	11,320	53.6	
Liberal and Country	James Mactier	7,709	36.5	
Labor (A-C)	Alexander Lee	2,094	9.9	
Total formal votes		21,123	99.1	
Informal votes		200	0.9	
Turnout		21,323	95.5	
Two-party-preferred result
Labor	Clive Stoneham	11,634	55.1	
Liberal and Country	James Mactier	9,489	44.9	
Labor hold		Swing		

=== Mildura ===
1955 Victorian state election: Mildura
Party	Candidate	Votes	%	±%
Country	Nathaniel Barclay	9,356	52.2	
Labor	Alan Lind	8,579	47.8	
Total formal votes		17,935	99.1	
Informal votes		159	0.9	
Turnout		18,094	94.8	
Country gain from Labor		Swing		

=== Moonee Ponds ===
1955 Victorian state election: Moonee Ponds
Party	Candidate	Votes	%	±%
Labor	Samuel Merrifield	9,389	46.0	
Liberal and Country	Jack Holden	6,846	33.5	
Labor (A-C)	Harold Hilbert	4,167	20.4	
Total formal votes		20,402	98.7	
Informal votes		272	1.3	
Turnout		20,674	93.9	
Two-party-preferred result
Liberal and Country	Jack Holden	10,633	52.1	
Labor	Samuel Merrifield	9,769	47.9	
Liberal and Country gain from Labor		Swing		

=== Moorabbin ===
1955 Victorian state election: Moorabbin
Party	Candidate	Votes	%	±%
Liberal and Country	Bob Suggett	11,869	40.0	
Labor	Les Coates	11,673	39.4	
Labor (A-C)	Edward White	3,126	10.5	
Victorian Liberal	William Dawnay-Mould	2,985	10.1	
Total formal votes		29,653	98.0	
Informal votes		591	2.0	
Turnout		30,244	95.1	
Two-party-preferred result
Liberal and Country	Bob Suggett	17,185	57.9	
Labor	Les Coates	12,468	42.1	
Liberal and Country gain from Labor		Swing		

=== Mornington ===
1955 Victorian state election: Mornington
Party	Candidate	Votes	%	±%
Liberal and Country	William Leggatt	14,327	65.2	
Victorian Liberal	Fred Jarman	7,646	34.8	
Total formal votes		21,973	96.2	
Informal votes		870	3.8	
Turnout		28,843	92.5	
Liberal and Country hold		Swing		

=== Morwell ===
1955 Victorian state election: Morwell
Party	Candidate	Votes	%	±%
Labor	Hector Stoddart	7,933	41.3	
Liberal and Country	Jim Balfour	4,993	26.0	
Country	George Purvis	4,287	22.3	
Labor (A-C)	Gordon Green	1,979	10.3	
Total formal votes		19,192	98.4	
Informal votes		303	1.6	
Turnout		19,495	92.9	
Two-party-preferred result
Liberal and Country	Jim Balfour	10,198	53.1	
Labor	Hector Stoddart	8,994	46.9	
Liberal and Country gain from Labor		Swing		

=== Murray Valley ===
1955 Victorian state election: Murray Valley
Party	Candidate	Votes	%	±%
Country	George Moss	11,386	57.7	
Labor	Kenneth Lenne	5,001	25.3	
Labor (A-C)	Stewart Morvell	3,344	16.9	
Total formal votes		19,731	98.6	
Informal votes		278	1.4	
Turnout		20,009	95.0	
Two-party-preferred result
Country	George Moss	14,395	73.0	
Labor	Kenneth Lenne	5,336	27.0	
Country hold		Swing		

=== Northcote ===
1955 Victorian state election: Northcote
Party	Candidate	Votes	%	±%
Labor	John Cain	10,655	60.9	
Liberal and Country	Neil McKay	3,953	22.6	
Labor (A-C)	David Woodhouse	2,890	16.5	
Total formal votes		17,498	98.3	
Informal votes		294	1.7	
Turnout		17,792	92.7	
Two-party-preferred result
Labor	John Cain	11,089	63.4	
Liberal and Country	Neil McKay	6,409	36.6	
Labor hold		Swing		

=== Oakleigh ===
1955 Victorian state election: Oakleigh
Party	Candidate	Votes	%	±%
Labor	Val Doube	9,111	49.1	
Liberal and Country	Max Fox	7,564	40.8	
Labor (A-C)	Donald Murray	1,874	10.1	
Total formal votes		18,549	98.7	
Informal votes		247	1.3	
Turnout		18,796	95.1	
Two-party-preferred result
Labor	Val Doube	9,377	50.6	
Liberal and Country	Max Fox	9,172	49.4	
Labor hold		Swing		

=== Pascoe Vale ===
1955 Victorian state election: Pascoe Vale
Party	Candidate	Votes	%	±%
Labor	Arthur Drakeford	9,032	42.7	
Liberal and Country	Rudolph Reid	7,085	33.5	
Labor (A-C)	George Fewster	4,173	19.7	
Independent	Colin Portway	486	2.3	
Henry George Justice	Lancelot Hutchinson	397	1.9	
Total formal votes		21,173	2.4	
Informal votes		515	2.4	
Turnout		21,688	95.4	
Two-party-preferred result
Labor	Arthur Drakeford	12,680	59.9	
Liberal	Rudolph Reid	8,493	40.1	
Labor hold		Swing		

=== Polwarth ===
1955 Victorian state election: Polwarth
Party	Candidate	Votes	%	±%
Liberal and Country	Edward Guye	10,543	54.6	
Labor	Phillip Denning	4,817	24.9	
Country	Ronald Harris	3,963	20.5	
Total formal votes		19,323	98.9	
Informal votes		220	1.1	
Turnout		19,543	95.8	
Two-party-preferred result
Liberal and Country	Edward Guye	14,110	73.0	
Labor	Phillip Denning	5,213	27.0	
Liberal and Country hold		Swing		

=== Portland ===
1955 Victorian state election: Portland
Party	Candidate	Votes	%	±%
Labor	Malcolm Gladman	6,753	37.3	
Liberal and Country	George Gibbs	5,629	31.1	
Country	Cyril Brimblecombe	2,886	16.0	
Labor (A-C)	William O'Sullivan	2,818	15.6	
Total formal votes		18,086	98.5	
Informal votes		275	1.5	
Turnout		18,361	96.2	
Two-party-preferred result
Liberal and Country	George Gibbs	10,495	58.0	
Labor	Malcolm Gladman	7,591	42.0	
Liberal and Country hold		Swing		

=== Port Melbourne ===
1955 Victorian state election: Port Melbourne
Party	Candidate	Votes	%	±%
Labor	Archie Todd	7,701	50.1	
Labor (A-C)	Stan Corrigan	5,349	34.8	
Liberal and Country	John Talbot	1,972	12.8	
Communist	Laurence Troy	340	2.2	
Total formal votes		15,362	95.9	
Informal votes		657	4.1	
Turnout		16,019	93.1	
Two-candidate-preferred result
Labor	Archie Todd	8,492	55.3	
Labor (A-C)	Stan Corrigan	6,870	44.7	
Labor hold		Swing		

=== Prahran ===
1955 Victorian state election: Prahran
Party	Candidate	Votes	%	±%
Labor	Robert Pettiona	7,738	47.3	
Liberal and Country	Sam Loxton	5,847	35.7	
Labor (A-C)	James Johnson	2,238	13.7	
Independent	Leonard Bennett	553	3.4	
Total formal votes		16,376	96.6	
Informal votes		576	3.4	
Turnout		16,952	92.6	
Two-party-preferred result
Liberal and Country	Sam Loxton	8,195	50.04	
Labor	Robert Pettiona	8,181	49.96	
Liberal and Country gain from Labor		Swing		

=== Preston ===
1955 Victorian state election: Preston
Party	Candidate	Votes	%	±%
Labor	Charlie Ring	11,429	52.4	
Liberal and Country	Frank Block	6,881	31.5	
Labor (A-C)	Thomas Hartnedy	3,515	16.1	
Total formal votes		21,825	97.6	
Informal votes		542	2.4	
Turnout		22,367	95.5	
Two-party-preferred result
Labor	Charlie Ring	11,955	54.8	
Liberal and Country	Frank Block	9,870	45.2	
Labor hold		Swing		

=== Reservoir ===
1955 Victorian state election: Reservoir
Party	Candidate	Votes	%	±%
Labor	William Ruthven	12,247	55.1	
Liberal and Country	Frederick Capp	6,593	29.6	
Labor (A-C)	Edmund Morrissey	3,405	15.3	
Total formal votes		22,245	98.1	
Informal votes		427	1.9	
Turnout		22,672	96.1	
Two-party-preferred result
Labor	William Ruthven	12,758	57.3	
Liberal and Country	Frederick Capp	9,487	42.7	
Labor hold		Swing		

=== Richmond ===
1955 Victorian state election: Richmond
Party	Candidate	Votes	%	±%
Labor (A-C)	Frank Scully	6,159	40.4	
Labor	Patrick O'Connell	5,967	39.2	
Liberal and Country	Barry Dove	2,622	17.2	
Communist	Kenneth Miller	484	3.2	
Total formal votes		15,232	95.9	
Informal votes		647	4.1	
Turnout		15,879	95.2	
Two-candidate-preferred result
Labor (A-C)	Frank Scully	8,053	52.9	
Labor	Patrick O'Connell	7,179	47.1	
Labor (A-C) gain from Labor		Swing		

=== Ripponlea ===
1955 Victorian state election: Ripponlea
Party	Candidate	Votes	%	±%
Liberal and Country	Edgar Tanner	6,799	44.2	
Labor (A-C)	George Miller	4,121	26.8	
Victorian Liberal	Thomas Hollway	3,723	24.2	
Communist	Ted Laurie	750	4.9	
Total formal votes		15,393	94.3	
Informal votes		933	5.7	
Turnout		16,326	90.6	
Two-candidate-preferred result
Liberal and Country	Edgar Tanner	9,722	63.1	
Labor (A-C)	George Miller	5,671	36.9	
Liberal and Country gain from Victorian Liberal		Swing		

=== Rodney ===
1955 Victorian state election: Rodney
Party	Candidate	Votes	%	±%
Country	Richard Brose	12,157	61.8	
Liberal and Country	Leslie Lord	7,504	38.2	
Total formal votes		19,661	98.1	
Informal votes		380	1.9	
Turnout		20,041	95.0	
Country hold		Swing		

=== St Kilda ===
1955 Victorian state election: St Kilda
Party	Candidate	Votes	%	±%
Liberal and Country	Baron Snider	7,238	44.1	
Labor	John Bourke	6,967	42.4	
Victorian Liberal	Arnold Blashki	1,755	10.7	
Total formal votes		16,414	96.5	
Informal votes		589	3.5	
Turnout		17,003	91.8	
Two-party-preferred result
Liberal and Country	Baron Snider	8,768	53.4	
Labor	John Bourke	7,646	46.6	
Liberal and Country gain from Labor		Swing		

=== Sandringham ===
1955 Victorian state election: Sandringham
Party	Candidate	Votes	%	±%
Liberal and Country	Murray Porter	13,120	47.1	
Labor	Henry Fowler	9,526	34.2	
Labor (A-C)	John Ryan	3,740	13.4	
Independent	Alexander Steele	1,437	5.2	
Total formal votes		27,823	98.2	
Informal votes		510	1.8	
Turnout		28,333	94.3	
Two-party-preferred result
Liberal and Country	Murray Porter	17,404	62.6	
Labor	Henry Fowler	10,419	37.4	
Liberal and Country hold		Swing		

=== Scoresby ===
1955 Victorian state election: Scoresby
Party	Candidate	Votes	%	±%
Liberal and Country	George Knox	20,234	64.2	
Labor	Reginald Robertson	11,270	35.8	
Total formal votes		31,504	98.5	
Informal votes		483	1.5	
Turnout		31,987	93.6	
Liberal and Country hold		Swing		

=== Swan Hill ===
1955 Victorian state election: Swan Hill
Party	Candidate	Votes	%	±%
Country	Harold Stirling	8,105	46.4	
Independent Country	Duncan Douglas	5,824	33.4	
Independent Liberal	John Hipworth	3,528	20.2	
Total formal votes		17,457	98.0	
Informal votes		348	2.0	
Turnout		17,805	94.5	
Two-candidate-preferred result
Country	Harold Stirling	9,472	54.2	
Independent Country	Duncan Douglas	7,985	45.8	
Country hold		Swing		

=== Toorak ===
1955 Victorian state election: Toorak
Party	Candidate	Votes	%	±%
Liberal and Country	Horace Petty	10,408	64.2	
Independent Labor	George Gahan	3,578	22.1	
Victorian Liberal	Geoffrey Kiddle	2,225	13.7	
Total formal votes		16,211	95.9	
Informal votes		698	4.1	
Turnout		16,909	91.4	
Two-candidate-preferred result
Liberal and Country	Horace Petty	12,077	74.5	
Independent Labor	George Gahan	4,134	25.5	
Liberal and Country hold		Swing		

=== Williamstown ===
1955 Victorian state election: Williamstown
Party	Candidate	Votes	%	±%
Labor	Larry Floyd	11,690	63.3	
Liberal and Country	James Wilkie	3,918	21.2	
Labor (A-C)	Herbert Stackpoole	2,846	15.4	
Total formal votes		18,454	98.6	
Informal votes		263	1.4	
Turnout		18,717	94.9	
Two-party-preferred result
Labor	Larry Floyd	12,117	65.6	
Liberal and Country	James Wilkie	6,337	34.4	
Labor hold		Swing		

== See also ==
- 1955 Victorian state election
- Members of the Victorian Legislative Assembly, 1955–1958
