= Candidates of the 1955 Victorian state election =

The 1955 Victorian state election was held on 28 May 1955.

== Seat changes ==
There was a redistribution of boundaries in 1955. In consequence:

- Allandale Country MLA Russell White contested Ballarat North.
- Ballarat Labor MLA John Sheehan contested Ballarat South.
- Barwon LCP MLA Thomas Maltby contested Geelong.
- Borung LCP MLA Wilfred Mibus contested Lowan.
- Brunswick Anti-Communist MLA Peter Randles contested Brunswick West.
- Clifton Hill Anti-Communist MLA Joseph O'Carroll contested Brunswick East.
- Dandenong Labor MLA Les Coates contested Moorabbin.
- Essendon Anti-Communist MLA George Fewster contested Pascoe Vale.
- Footscray Labor MLA Jack Holland contested Flemington.
- Geelong Independent Labor MLA James Dunn contested Geelong West.
- Gippsland North Labor MLA Hector Stoddart contested Morwell.
- Glen Iris VLP MLA Thomas Hollway contested Ripponlea.
- Goulburn Labor MLA Joseph Smith contested Broadmeadows.
- Korong LCP MLA Keith Turnbull contested Kara Kara.
- Ivanhoe Anti-Communist MLA Michael Lucy contested Evelyn.
- Mernda Anti-Communist MLA Edmund Morrissey contested Reservoir.
- Preston Labor MLA William Ruthven contested Reservoir.
- Ripon Labor MLA Ernie Morton contested Hampden.
- Sunshine Labor MLA Ernie Shepherd contested Ascot Vale.
- Warrnambool Labor MLA Malcolm Gladman contested Portland.

== Retiring Members ==
=== Labor ===
- Robert Holt MLA (Portland)
- John Lemmon MLA (Williamstown)

=== Country ===
- William Buckingham MLA (Wonthaggi)
- Keith Dodgshun MLA (Rainbow)

== Legislative Assembly ==
Sitting members are shown in bold text. Successful candidates are highlighted in the relevant colour. Where there is possible confusion, an asterisk (*) is also used.

Electorate	Held by	Labor candidates	LCP candidates	Country candidates	Labor (A-C) candidates	Other candidates
Albert Park	Labor	**Keith Sutton**	Thomas Merrett		Albert Jones	
Ascot Vale	Labor	**Ernie Shepherd**	George Evans		Paul Gunn	
Ballarat North	Country	Jack Smethurst	Arthur Nicholson	**Russell White**	Thomas Lane	
Ballarat South	Labor	**John Sheehan**	Gordon Scott		Alfred Purdue	
Balwyn	LCP	Florence Rodan	Alex Taylor			
Benalla	Country		Jack Pennington	**Frederick Cook**	Ernest Straughair	
Benambra	Country		Norman Attree	**Tom Mitchell**	William Findlay	James Prendergast (Ind CP)
Bendigo	Labor	**Bill Galvin**	John Stanistreet	Norman Oliver	Arthur Cook	
Box Hill	Labor	**Bob Gray**	George Reid		Maurice Weston	Leslie Bawden (HGJP); Leslie McCredden (Ind)
Brighton	VLP		John Rossiter			Marcella Sullivan (Ind Lab); **Ray Tovell** (VLP)
Broadmeadows	Labor	**Joseph Smith**	Harry Kane	James Webster		
Brunswick East	Labor	Leo Fennessy	Alfred Wall		**Joseph O'Carroll**	
Brunswick West	Labor	Campbell Turnbull	Alisa Gaston		**Peter Randles**	
Burwood	LCP	Gwendolyn Noad	Jim MacDonald		William Mahoney	Ivan Robinson (HGJP)
Camberwell	LCP	Barry Jones	**Robert Whately**			
Carlton	Labor	Denis Lovegrove	Francis Michaelson		**Bill Barry**	John Prescott (CPA)
Caulfield	VLP		Joe Rafferty			**Alexander Dennett** (VLP)
Caulfield East	LCP	Robert Flanagan	Alexander Fraser		Bernard Tarpey	
Coburg	Ind Labor		Donald Abernethy		Kevin Hayes	**Charlie Mutton** (Ind Lab)
Collingwood	Labor	**Bill Towers**	Martha Yuille		William Livy	
Dandenong	Labor	John Tripovich	Ray Wiltshire		Reginald Kearney	
Dundas	Labor	**Bob McClure**	William McDonald	John O'Brien	John Peters	
Elsternwick	VLP		Richard Gainey			**John Don** (VLP); Donald Tottey (Ind Lab)
Evelyn	Labor	**Phillip Connell**	Arthur Ireland		**Michael Lucy**	
Flemington	Labor	**Jack Holland**			John Hayes	
Footscray	Labor	Roy Schintler	George Punshon		William Lloyd	
Geelong	Labor	George Poyser	**Thomas Maltby**			Norman MacKay (Ind); Charles Plummer (VLP)
Geelong West	Labor	Colin MacDonald	Geoffrey Thom		James Mahoney	James Dowsett (Ind); **James Dunn** (Ind)
Gippsland East	Country			**Sir Albert Lind**	Frank Burns	
Gippsland South	Country			**Sir Herbert Hyland**		
Gippsland West	Country		Colin Ferres	**Leslie Cochrane**		Walter Doig (CPA)
Grant	Labor	Roy Crick	Max Gillett		**Leslie D'Arcy**	
Hampden	LCP	**Ernie Morton**	**Henry Bolte**			
Hawthorn	Labor	Jack Poke	Jim Manson		**Charles Murphy**	William Pitt (HGJP)
Ivanhoe	Labor	David Walker	Vernon Christie		John O'Dwyer	
Kara Kara	LCP		**Keith Turnbull**	Ian McCann		
Kew	LCP	Norman Williams	**Arthur Rylah**			Ralph Gibson (CPA)
Lowan	LCP		**Wilfred Mibus**	Griffith Perkins		
Malvern	LCP		**John Bloomfield**			Mascotte Brown (VLP)
Melbourne	Labor	Arthur Clarey	Alan Etherington		**Tom Hayes**	
Mentone	Labor	Alfred O'Connor	Edward Meagher		**George White**	
Midlands	Labor	**Clive Stoneham**	James Mactier		Alexander Lee	
Mildura	Labor	**Alan Lind**		Nathaniel Barclay		
Moonee Ponds	Labor	**Samuel Merrifield**	Jack Holden		Harold Hilbert	
Moorabbin	Labor	**Les Coates**	Bob Suggett		Edward White	William Dawnay-Mould (VLP)
Mornington	LCP		**William Leggatt**			Fred Jarman (VLP)
Morwell	Labor	**Hector Stoddart**	Jim Balfour	George Purvis	Gordon Green	
Murray Valley	Country	Kenneth Lenne		**George Moss**	Stewart Morvell	
Northcote	Labor	**John Cain**	Neil McKay		David Woodhouse	
Oakleigh	Labor	**Val Doube**	Max Fox		Donald Murray	
Pascoe Vale	Labor	Arthur Drakeford	Rudolph Reid		**George Fewster**	Lancelot Hutchinson (HGJP); Colin Portway (Ind)
Polwarth	LCP	Phillip Denning	**Edward Guye**	Ronald Harris		
Portland	Labor	**Malcolm Gladman**	George Gibbs	Cyril Brimblecombe	William O'Sullivan	
Port Melbourne	Labor	Archie Todd	John Talbot		**Stan Corrigan**	Laurence Troy (CPA)
Prahran	Labor	**Robert Pettiona**	Sam Loxton		James Johnson	Leonard Bennett (Ind)
Preston	Labor	Charlie Ring	Frank Block		Thomas Hartnedy	
Reservoir	Labor	**William Ruthven**	Frederick Capp		**Edmund Morrissey**	
Richmond	Labor	Patrick O'Connell	Barry Dove		**Frank Scully**	Kenneth Miller (CPA)
Ripponlea	VLP		Edgar Tanner		George Miller	**Thomas Hollway** (VLP); Ted Laurie (CPA)
Rodney	Country		Leslie Lord	**Richard Brose**		
St Kilda	Labor	**John Bourke**	Baron Snider			Arnold Blashki (VLP)
Sandringham	LCP	Henry Fowler	Murray Porter		John Ryan	Alexander Steele (Ind)
Scoresby	LCP	Reginald Robertson	**Sir George Knox**			
Swan Hill	Country			**Harold Stirling**		Duncan Douglas (Ind CP); John Hipworth (Ind Lib)
Toorak	LCP		**Horace Petty**			George Gahan (Ind Lab); Geoffrey Kiddle (VLP)
Williamstown	Labor	Larry Floyd	James Wilkie		Herbert Stackpoole	

== See also ==
- 1955 Victorian Legislative Council election
