= Results of the 1961 Victorian state election (Legislative Assembly) =

Australian state election results

Victorian state election, 15 July 1961 Legislative Assembly << 1958–1964 >>
Enrolled voters	1,554,856				
Votes cast	1,554,856		Turnout	94.41	+0.18
Informal votes	35,937		Informal	2.45	+0.67
Summary of votes by party
Party	Primary votes	%	Swing	Seats	Change
Labor	552,015	38.55	+0.86	17	– 1
Liberal and Country	521,777	36.44	–0.74	39	± 0
Democratic Labor	242,753	16.95	+2.53	0	± 0
Country	102,184	7.14	–2.16	9	± 0
Other	3,722	0.26	+0.16	0	± 0
Independent	9,474	0.66	–0.64	1	+ 1
Total	1,431,925			66	
Two-party-preferred
Liberal and Country	829,977	57.9	+0.1		
Labor	602,493	42.1	–0.1		

This is a list of electoral district results for the Victorian 1961 election.

== Results by electoral district ==
=== Albert Park ===
1961 Victorian state election: Albert Park
Party	Candidate	Votes	%	±%
Labor	Keith Sutton	8,736	56.1	+7.2
Democratic Labor	Albert Jones	3,437	22.1	−1.7
Liberal and Country	Thomas Merrett	3,404	21.8	−2.9
Total formal votes		15,577	96.6	−0.8
Informal votes		554	3.4	+0.8
Turnout		16,131	92.6	+0.3
Two-party-preferred result
Labor	Keith Sutton	9,252	59.4	+5.0
Liberal and Country	Thomas Merrett	6,325	40.6	−5.0
Labor hold		Swing	+5.0	

- The two candidate preferred vote was not counted between the Labor and DLP candidates for Albert Park.

=== Ballarat North ===
1961 Victorian state election: Ballarat North
Party	Candidate	Votes	%	±%
Labor	Philip Gray	7,842	36.8	+7.1
Liberal and Country	Tom Evans	7,653	35.9	+15.6
Democratic Labor	Walter Brown	4,038	19.0	+3.2
Country	Alexander Hoffert	1,765	8.3	−26.0
Total formal votes		21,298	98.5	0.0
Informal votes		315	1.5	0.0
Turnout		21,613	95.7	−0.6
Two-party-preferred result
Liberal and Country	Tom Evans	12,732	59.8	+22.5
Labor	Philip Gray	8,566	40.2	+40.2
Liberal and Country gain from Country		Swing	N/A	

=== Ballarat South ===
1961 Victorian state election: Ballarat South
Party	Candidate	Votes	%	±%
Labor	Ron Wilson	8,394	41.4	+6.4
Liberal and Country	Gordon Scott	8,194	40.4	+0.9
Democratic Labor	Francis Brown	3,691	18.2	−0.9
Total formal votes		20,279	98.5	+0.3
Informal votes		316	1.5	−0.3
Turnout		20,595	95.7	−0.6
Two-party-preferred result
Liberal and Country	Gordon Scott	11,491	56.7	−2.5
Labor	Ron Wilson	8,788	43.3	+2.5
Liberal and Country hold		Swing	−2.5	

=== Balwyn ===
1961 Victorian state election: Balwyn
Party	Candidate	Votes	%	±%
Liberal and Country	Alex Taylor	15,653	62.4	+1.7
Labor	Edmund Du Vergier	6,104	24.3	+1.8
Democratic Labor	Leo Erwin	3,346	13.3	+2.9
Total formal votes		25,113	98.5	−0.1
Informal votes		380	1.5	+0.1
Turnout		25,493	94.1	+0.1
Two-party-preferred result
Liberal and Country	Alex Taylor	18,506	73.7	−1.3
Labor	Edmund Du Vergier	6,607	26.3	+1.3
Liberal and Country hold		Swing	−1.3	

=== Benalla ===
1961 Victorian state election: Benalla
Party	Candidate	Votes	%	±%
Country	Tom Trewin	7,007	35.8	+1.6
Labor	Jack Ginifer	5,758	29.5	+1.0
Liberal and Country	John Hanson	3,785	19.4	−4.6
Democratic Labor	Bartholomew O'Dea	3,000	15.4	+2.0
Total formal votes		19,550	98.0	−1.0
Informal votes		394	2.0	+1.0
Turnout		19,944	98.8	+4.0
Two-party-preferred result
Country	Tom Trewin	13,102	67.0	−0.1
Labor	Jack Ginifer	6,448	33.0	+0.1
Country hold		Swing	−0.1	

=== Benambra ===
1961 Victorian state election: Benambra
Party	Candidate	Votes	%	±%
Country	Tom Mitchell	10,835	50.7	+0.6
Labor	Reginald Mortimer	4,920	23.0	+2.3
Democratic Labor	William Findlay	3,445	16.1	0.0
Liberal and Country	Robert Kilpatrick	2,171	10.2	−2.8
Total formal votes		21,371	98.0	−0.7
Informal votes		435	2.0	+0.7
Turnout		21,806	94.7	+0.5
Two-party-preferred result
Country	Tom Mitchell	15,718	73.6	−2.0
Labor	Reginald Mortimer	5,653	26.4	+2.0
Country hold		Swing	−2.0	

=== Bendigo ===
1961 Victorian state election: Bendigo
Party	Candidate	Votes	%	±%
Labor	Bill Galvin	10,875	52.1	+4.9
Liberal and Country	Thomas Flood	6,579	31.5	+4.1
Democratic Labor	Paul Brennan	3,434	16.4	+3.4
Total formal votes		20,888	98.8	+0.3
Informal votes		263	1.2	−0.3
Turnout		21,151	96.6	+0.2
Two-party-preferred result
Labor	Bill Galvin	11,389	54.5	+2.5
Liberal and Country	Thomas Flood	9,499	45.5	−2.5
Labor hold		Swing	+2.5	

=== Box Hill ===
1961 Victorian state election: Box Hill
Party	Candidate	Votes	%	±%
Liberal and Country	George Reid	15,546	55.2	−3.0
Labor	William O'Grady	7,873	28.0	−2.3
Democratic Labor	Edmund Burgi	4,717	16.8	+5.4
Total formal votes		28,143	98.2	−0.5
Informal votes		525	1.8	+0.5
Turnout		28,661	93.9	0.0
Two-party-preferred result
Liberal and Country	George Reid	19,557	69.5	+1.5
Labor	William O'Grady	8,579	30.5	−1.5
Liberal and Country hold		Swing	+1.5	

=== Brighton ===
1961 Victorian state election: Brighton
Party	Candidate	Votes	%	±%
Liberal and Country	John Rossiter	11,218	58.3	−8.7
Labor	Geoffrey Blunden	5,333	27.7	−5.3
Democratic Labor	Edwin McSweeney	2,678	13.9	+13.9
Total formal votes		19,229	98.3	−0.1
Informal votes		323	1.7	+0.1
Turnout		19,552	93.7	0.0
Two-party-preferred result
Liberal and Country	John Rossiter	13,494	70.2	+3.2
Labor	Geoffrey Blunden	5,735	29.8	−3.2
Liberal and Country hold		Swing	+3.2	

=== Broadmeadows ===
1961 Victorian state election: Broadmeadows
Party	Candidate	Votes	%	±%
Labor	Joseph Smith	17,650	44.4	−2.6
Liberal and Country	Harry Kane	13,651	34.3	−2.9
Democratic Labor	John Donnellon	7,529	18.9	+3.1
Independent	Anthony van der Loo	908	2.3	+2.3
Total formal votes		39,738	97.5	−1.1
Informal votes		1,026	2.5	+1.1
Turnout		40,764	95.1	+1.0
Two-party-preferred result
Liberal and Country	Harry Kane	21,076	53.0	+2.2
Labor	Joseph Smith	18,662	47.0	−2.2
Liberal and Country hold		Swing	+2.2	

=== Brunswick East ===
1961 Victorian state election: Brunswick East
Party	Candidate	Votes	%	±%
Labor	Leo Fennessy	9,385	63.5	+5.6
Democratic Labor	Allan Swain	3,337	22.6	+4.3
Liberal and Country	Warren Mills	2,059	13.9	−10.0
Total formal votes		14,781	94.2	−3.0
Informal votes		902	5.8	+3.0
Turnout		15,683	92.3	−0.6
Two-party-preferred result
Labor	Leo Fennessy	9,896	66.9	+6.3
Liberal and Country	Warren Mills	4,885	33.1	−6.3
Labor hold		Swing	+6.3	

- The two candidate preferred vote was not counted between the Labor and DLP candidates for Brunswick East.

=== Brunswick West ===
1961 Victorian state election: Brunswick West
Party	Candidate	Votes	%	±%
Labor	Campbell Turnbull	9,159	52.3	+1.1
Democratic Labor	John Flint	4,251	24.3	−0.3
Liberal and Country	Norman Glass	4,094	23.4	−0.9
Total formal votes		17,504	95.8	−1.8
Informal votes		758	4.2	+1.8
Turnout		18,262	93.8	0.0
Two-party-preferred result
Labor	Campbell Turnbull	9,797	56.0	+1.1
Liberal and Country	Norman Glass	7,707	44.0	−1.1
Labor hold		Swing	+1.1	

- The two candidate preferred vote was not counted between the Labor and DLP candidates for Brunswick West.

=== Burwood ===
1961 Victorian state election: Burwood
Party	Candidate	Votes	%	±%
Liberal and Country	Jim MacDonald	11,929	59.3	−10.7
Labor	Peter Lynn	5,252	26.1	−3.9
Democratic Labor	John Duffy	2,944	14.6	+14.6
Total formal votes		20,125	98.4	0.0
Informal votes		319	1.6	0.0
Turnout		20,444	94.7	−0.1
Two-party-preferred result
Liberal and Country	Jim MacDonald	14,382	71.7	+1.6
Labor	Peter Lynn	5,743	28.3	−1.6
Liberal and Country hold		Swing	+1.6	

=== Camberwell ===
1961 Victorian state election: Camberwell
Party	Candidate	Votes	%	±%
Liberal and Country	Vernon Wilcox	10,773	57.3	−3.1
Labor	Anthony Giblett	5,218	27.8	+0.6
Democratic Labor	Celia Laird	2,808	14.9	+2.4
Total formal votes		18,799	97.9	−0.4
Informal votes		406	2.1	+0.4
Turnout		19,205	93.0	−0.7
Two-party-preferred result
Liberal and Country	Vernon Wilcox	13,160	70.0	−2.0
Labor	Anthony Giblett	5,639	30.0	+2.0
Liberal and Country hold		Swing	−2.0	

=== Caulfield ===
1961 Victorian state election: Caulfield
Party	Candidate	Votes	%	±%
Liberal and Country	Alexander Fraser	10,676	55.3	−3.9
Labor	Sydney Edwards	5,137	26.6	−1.0
Democratic Labor	Walter Culliford	3,474	18.0	+4.8
Total formal votes		19,287	97.9	−0.6
Informal votes		410	2.1	+0.6
Turnout		19,697	91.9	−0.5
Two-party-preferred result
Liberal and Country	Alexander Fraser	13,629	70.7	+0.2
Labor	Sydney Edwards	5,658	29.3	−0.2
Liberal and Country hold		Swing	+0.2	

=== Coburg ===
1961 Victorian state election: Coburg
Party	Candidate	Votes	%	±%
Labor	Charlie Mutton	11,658	58.8	−3.6
Democratic Labor	John Livingstone	4,149	20.9	+5.9
Liberal and Country	Bryce Pyatt	4,036	20.3	−2.2
Total formal votes		19,843	97.0	−1.1
Informal votes		617	3.0	+1.1
Turnout		20,460	95.2	−0.2
Two-party-preferred result
Labor	Charlie Mutton	12,280	61.9	−2.8
Liberal and Country	Bryce Pyatt	7,563	38.1	+2.8
Labor hold		Swing	−2.8	

- The two candidate preferred vote was not counted between the Labor and DLP candidates for Coburg.

=== Dandenong ===
1961 Victorian state election: Dandenong
Party	Candidate	Votes	%	±%
Labor	Alan Lind	14,949	43.0	+1.3
Liberal and Country	Len Reid	14,290	41.1	−2.7
Democratic Labor	John Simmons	5,538	15.9	+1.5
Total formal votes		34,777	97.9	−0.3
Informal votes		762	2.1	+0.3
Turnout		35,539	94.6	+0.8
Two-party-preferred result
Liberal and Country	Len Reid	19,232	55.3	+1.8
Labor	Alan Lind	15,545	44.7	−1.8
Liberal and Country hold		Swing	+1.8	

=== Dundas ===
1961 Victorian state election: Dundas
Party	Candidate	Votes	%	±%
Liberal and Country	William McDonald	9,344	45.0	−3.7
Labor	Bob McClure	8,463	40.8	+1.2
Democratic Labor	James Eveston	2,943	14.2	+2.5
Total formal votes		20,750	98.9	−0.4
Informal votes		237	1.1	+0.4
Turnout		20,987	96.4	+0.2
Two-party-preferred result
Liberal and Country	William McDonald	11,484	55.3	−3.1
Labor	Bob McClure	9,266	44.7	+3.1
Liberal and Country hold		Swing	−3.1	

=== Elsternwick ===
1961 Victorian state election: Elsternwick
Party	Candidate	Votes	%	±%
Liberal and Country	Richard Gainey	10,618	55.6	−3.3
Labor	George Smith	5,287	27.7	+1.9
Democratic Labor	Edward Preece	3,174	16.6	+1.3
Total formal votes		19,079	97.9	−0.3
Informal votes		407	2.1	+0.3
Turnout		19,486	94.6	+1.8
Two-party-preferred result
Liberal and Country	Richard Gainey	13,316	69.8	−2.1
Labor	George Smith	5,763	30.2	+2.1
Liberal and Country hold		Swing	−2.1	

=== Essendon ===
1961 Victorian state election: Essendon
Party	Candidate	Votes	%	±%
Liberal and Country	Kenneth Wheeler	9,054	39.9	+1.8
Labor	Leslie Edmunds	8,794	38.7	−6.2
Democratic Labor	Kevin Digby	4,564	20.1	+3.0
Independent	Norman McClure	294	1.3	+1.3
Total formal votes		22,706	97.4	−1.0
Informal votes		614	2.6	+1.0
Turnout		23,320	95.4	−0.3
Two-party-preferred result
Liberal and Country	Kenneth Wheeler	12,933	57.0	+5.5
Labor	Leslie Edmunds	9,773	43.0	−5.5
Liberal and Country hold		Swing	+5.5	

=== Evelyn ===
1961 Victorian state election: Evelyn
Party	Candidate	Votes	%	±%
Liberal and Country	Russell Stokes	12,302	43.3	−0.5
Labor	Donald King	11,424	40.2	−3.3
Democratic Labor	Kevin Gould	4,704	16.5	+3.7
Total formal votes		28,430	98.2	−0.3
Informal votes		516	1.8	+0.3
Turnout		28,946	93.9	−0.5
Two-party-preferred result
Liberal and Country	Russell Stokes	15,647	55.0	+0.9
Labor	Donald King	12,783	45.0	−0.9
Liberal and Country hold		Swing	+0.9	

=== Fitzroy ===
1961 Victorian state election: Fitzroy
Party	Candidate	Votes	%	±%
Labor	Denis Lovegrove	8,427	57.5	−7.3
Democratic Labor	Bill Barry	3,951	26.9	+8.1
Liberal and Country	Maxwell Lee	2,285	15.6	−0.7
Total formal votes		14,663	93.8	−2.2
Informal votes		970	6.2	+2.2
Turnout		15,633	90.9	−0.7
Two-party-preferred result
Labor	Denis Lovegrove	9,019	61.5	−6.1
Liberal and Country	Maxwell Lee	5,644	38.5	+6.1
Labor hold		Swing	−6.1	

- The two candidate preferred vote was not counted between the Labor and DLP candidates for Fitzroy.

=== Flemington ===
1961 Victorian state election: Flemington
Party	Candidate	Votes	%	±%
Labor	Kevin Holland	10,444	62.6	−0.6
Liberal and Country	John Marshall	3,232	19.4	+2.6
Democratic Labor	Michael McMahon	3,005	18.0	−2.0
Total formal votes		16,681	96.6	−1.2
Informal votes		593	3.4	+1.2
Turnout		17,274	93.5	−1.7
Two-party-preferred result
Labor	Kevin Holland	10,894	65.3	−0.9
Liberal and Country	John Marshall	5,787	34.7	+0.9
Labor hold		Swing	−0.9	

=== Footscray ===
1961 Victorian state election: Footscray
Party	Candidate	Votes	%	±%
Labor	Bill Divers	12,196	65.7	−10.9
Democratic Labor	Walter Byrne	3,870	20.9	+8.8
Liberal and Country	Peter Oliver	2,485	13.4	+2.1
Total formal votes		18,551	95.9	−2.1
Informal votes		790	4.1	+2.1
Turnout		19,341	95.6	−0.4
Two-party-preferred result
Labor	Bill Divers	12,776	68.9	−9.5
Liberal and Country	Peter Oliver	5,775	31.1	+9.5
Labor hold		Swing	−9.5	

- The two candidate preferred vote was not counted between the Labor and DLP candidates for Footscray.

=== Geelong ===
1961 Victorian state election: Geelong
Party	Candidate	Votes	%	±%
Liberal and Country	Hayden Birrell	9,241	46.2	+2.8
Labor	William King	7,590	38.0	+0.1
Democratic Labor	William Mithen	3,159	15.8	+3.9
Total formal votes		19,990	98.0	−0.7
Informal votes		411	2.0	+0.7
Turnout		20,401	93.8	+1.0
Two-party-preferred result
Liberal and Country	Hayden Birrell	11,839	59.2	+2.8
Labor	William King	8,151	40.8	−2.8
Liberal and Country hold		Swing	+2.8	

=== Geelong West ===
1961 Victorian state election: Geelong West
Party	Candidate	Votes	%	±%
Labor	Neil Trezise	11,510	48.0	+0.5
Liberal and Country	Max Gillett	9,244	38.6	−0.8
Democratic Labor	James Mahoney	3,207	13.4	+0.3
Total formal votes		23,961	98.0	−0.5
Informal votes		496	2.0	+0.5
Turnout		24,457	94.5	+1.3
Two-party-preferred result
Liberal and Country	Max Gillett	12,032	50.2	+0.1
Labor	Neil Trezise	11,929	49.8	−0.1
Liberal and Country hold		Swing	+0.1	

=== Gippsland East ===
1961 Victorian state election: Gippsland East
Party	Candidate	Votes	%	±%
Country	Bruce Evans	7,342	37.3	−20.9
Liberal and Country	Rae Archibald	4,752	24.1	+1.1
Labor	Neil Rosser	4,715	23.9	+23.9
Democratic Labor	Frank Burns	2,901	14.7	−4.1
Total formal votes		19,710	97.8	−0.7
Informal votes		441	2.2	+0.7
Turnout		20,151	93.6	−0.9
Two-party-preferred result
Country	Bruce Evans	14,085	71.5	−0.8
Labor	Neil Rosser	5,625	28.5	+28.5
Two-candidate-preferred result
Country	Bruce Evans	12,273	62.3	−10.0
Liberal and Country	Rae Archibald	7,437	37.7	+10.0
Country hold		Swing	−10.0	

=== Gippsland South ===
1961 Victorian state election: Gippsland South
Party	Candidate	Votes	%	±%
Country	Herbert Hyland	11,879	55.3	−21.5
Labor	Albert Thexton	4,181	19.5	+19.5
Democratic Labor	Geoffrey Farrell	2,918	13.6	−9.6
Liberal and Country	Leslie Horsfield	2,156	10.0	+10.0
Independent	Bryan Fitzgerald	340	1.6	+1.6
Total formal votes		21,474	97.2	−0.6
Informal votes		626	2.8	+0.6
Turnout		22,100	94.4	−0.5
Two-party-preferred result
Country	Herbert Hyland	16,471	76.7	−0.1
Labor	Albert Thexton	5,003	23.3	+23.3
Country hold		Swing	N/A	

=== Gippsland West ===
1961 Victorian state election: Gippsland West
Party	Candidate	Votes	%	±%
Country	Leslie Cochrane	8,224	39.6	−2.9
Labor	Eric Kent	5,237	25.2	−0.8
Liberal and Country	Toni Garside	4,463	21.5	+1.8
Democratic Labor	Kevin Scanlon	2,847	13.7	+1.9
Total formal votes		20,771	97.6	−0.9
Informal votes		508	2.4	+0.9
Turnout		21,279	95.1	−0.2
Two-party-preferred result
Country	Leslie Cochrane	15,284	73.6	+3.2
Labor	Eric Kent	5,487	26.4	−3.2
Country hold		Swing	+3.2	

=== Grant ===
1961 Victorian state election: Grant
Party	Candidate	Votes	%	±%
Labor	Roy Crick	19,305	55.4	−3.9
Democratic Labor	Robert Bainbridge	7,677	22.0	+6.1
Liberal and Country	Max Crellin	6,924	19.9	−4.9
Communist	William Wilson	940	2.7	+2.7
Total formal votes		35,381	97.4	−0.3
Informal votes		940	2.6	+0.3
Turnout		36,321	99.1	+4.5
Two-party-preferred result
Labor	Roy Crick	21,303	61.1	−0.6
Liberal and Country	Max Crellin	14,078	38.9	+0.6
Labor hold		Swing	−0.6	

- The two candidate preferred vote was not counted between the Labor and DLP candidates for Grant.

=== Hampden ===
1961 Victorian state election: Hampden
Party	Candidate	Votes	%	±%
Liberal and Country	Henry Bolte	10,442	52.3	−6.1
Labor	George Price	6,058	30.3	+3.4
Democratic Labor	Francis O'Brien	3,480	17.4	+2.7
Total formal votes		19,980	98.9	−0.2
Informal votes		231	1.1	+0.2
Turnout		20,211	96.4	−0.2
Two-party-preferred result
Liberal and Country	Henry Bolte	13,400	67.1	−3.8
Labor	George Price	6,580	32.9	+3.8
Liberal and Country hold		Swing	−3.8	

=== Hawthorn ===
1961 Victorian state election: Hawthorn
Party	Candidate	Votes	%	±%
Liberal and Country	Peter Garrisson	7,071	42.4	+1.2
Labor	John Reeves	6,657	39.9	−0.4
Democratic Labor	Charles Murphy	2,963	17.7	−0.7
Total formal votes		16,691	97.1	−0.7
Informal votes		496	2.9	+0.7
Turnout		17,187	91.8	−0.7
Two-party-preferred result
Liberal and Country	Peter Garrisson	9,568	57.3	+0.5
Labor	John Reeves	7,123	42.7	−0.5
Liberal and Country hold		Swing	+0.5	

=== Ivanhoe ===
1961 Victorian state election: Ivanhoe
Party	Candidate	Votes	%	±%
Liberal and Country	Vernon Christie	10,492	48.0	−0.2
Labor	Norman Rothfield	8,070	36.9	−1.1
Democratic Labor	Cyril Cummins	3,298	15.1	+1.3
Total formal votes		21,860	98.1	−0.6
Informal votes		413	1.9	+0.6
Turnout		22,273	94.3	+0.6
Two-party-preferred result
Liberal and Country	Vernon Christie	13,475	61.6	+1.2
Labor	Norman Rothfield	8,385	38.4	−1.2
Liberal and Country hold		Swing	+1.2	

=== Kara Kara ===
1961 Victorian state election: Kara Kara
Party	Candidate	Votes	%	±%
Liberal and Country	Keith Turnbull	6,224	33.5	−8.3
Labor	Cyril Sudholz	5,314	28.6	−1.3
Country	Bill Phelan	4,902	26.3	+8.8
Democratic Labor	Vincent Gervasoni	2,144	11.5	+0.7
Total formal votes		18,584	98.8	−0.2
Informal votes		225	1.2	+0.2
Turnout		18,809	96.4	−0.4
Two-party-preferred result
Liberal and Country	Keith Turnbull	11,864	63.8	−0.4
Labor	Cyril Sudholz	6,246	31.7	+0.4
Liberal and Country hold		Swing	−0.4	

=== Kew ===
1961 Victorian state election: Kew
Party	Candidate	Votes	%	±%
Liberal and Country	Arthur Rylah	11,452	59.5	−3.1
Labor	William Cooper	4,384	22.8	+3.3
Democratic Labor	Francis Duffy	3,068	15.9	+0.2
Communist	Eric Thornton	357	1.8	−0.4
Total formal votes		19,261	97.6	−0.5
Informal votes		466	2.4	+0.5
Turnout		19,727	91.9	−0.2
Two-party-preferred result
Liberal and Country	Arthur Rylah	14,096	73.2	−3.0
Labor	William Cooper	5,165	26.8	+3.0
Liberal and Country hold		Swing	−3.0	

=== Lowan ===
1961 Victorian state election: Lowan
Party	Candidate	Votes	%	±%
Liberal and Country	Wilfred Mibus	11,699	59.3	+4.8
Labor	James Redford	5,933	30.1	+30.1
Democratic Labor	Derek Williams	2,091	10.6	−6.0
Total formal votes		19,723	98.8	+0.1
Informal votes		245	1.2	−0.1
Turnout		19,968	96.0	−0.4
Two-party-preferred result
Liberal and Country	Wilfred Mibus	13,477	68.3	−0.7
Labor	James Redford	6,246	31.7	+0.7
Liberal and Country hold		Swing	−0.7	

=== Malvern ===
1961 Victorian state election: Malvern
Party	Candidate	Votes	%	±%
Liberal and Country	John Bloomfield	10,775	63.3	−6.2
Labor	James McGarvin	3,737	22.0	+22.0
Democratic Labor	Thomas Canty	2,513	14.8	+14.8
Total formal votes		17,025	97.8	+2.7
Informal votes		379	2.2	−2.7
Turnout		17,404	91.1	−0.1
Two-party-preferred result
Liberal and Country	John Bloomfield	13,011	75.8	−1.2
Labor	James McGarvin	4,014	24.2	+1.2
Liberal and Country hold		Swing	−1.2	

=== Melbourne ===
1961 Victorian state election: Melbourne
Party	Candidate	Votes	%	±%
Labor	Arthur Clarey	6,340	48.0	−2.2
Liberal and Country	Bill Burns	3,742	28.3	+5.8
Democratic Labor	Tom Hayes	2,909	22.0	−5.3
Independent	Henry Roche	209	1.6	+1.6
Total formal votes		13,200	93.6	−2.8
Informal votes		896	6.4	+2.8
Turnout		14,096	90.0	+1.0
Two-party-preferred result
Labor	Arthur Clarey	7,101	53.8	−0.5
Liberal and Country	Bill Burns	6,099	46.2	+0.5
Labor hold		Swing	−0.5	

=== Mentone ===
1961 Victorian state election: Mentone
Party	Candidate	Votes	%	±%
Labor	Nola Barber	10,019	41.4	+1.6
Liberal and Country	Edward Meagher	10,010	41.3	−2.2
Democratic Labor	George White	4,190	17.3	+0.6
Total formal votes		24,219	98.1	−0.3
Informal votes		475	1.9	+0.3
Turnout		24,694	94.4	−0.5
Two-party-preferred result
Liberal and Country	Edward Meagher	13,870	57.3	+0.2
Labor	Nola Barber	10,349	42.7	−0.2
Liberal and Country hold		Swing	+0.2	

=== Midlands ===
1961 Victorian state election: Midlands
Party	Candidate	Votes	%	±%
Labor	Clive Stoneham	11,424	51.8	+3.6
Liberal and Country	Keith Lewis	7,296	33.1	−5.1
Democratic Labor	John Timberlake	3,344	15.2	+1.6
Total formal votes		22,064	98.3	−0.8
Informal votes		377	1.7	+0.8
Turnout		22,441	96.3	+1.4
Two-party-preferred result
Labor	Clive Stoneham	11,925	54.1	+2.9
Liberal and Country	Keith Lewis	10,139	45.9	−2.9
Labor hold		Swing	+2.9	

=== Mildura ===
1961 Victorian state election: Mildura
Party	Candidate	Votes	%	±%
Country	Nathaniel Barclay	11,215	59.5	−1.1
Labor	Douglas Burgess	4,462	23.3	−4.7
Democratic Labor	William McInerney	1,809	9.4	−2.1
Liberal and Country	Raymond Dixon	1,696	8.8	+8.8
Total formal votes		19,182	97.4	−1.3
Informal votes		505	2.6	+1.3
Turnout		19,687	95.4	+0.4
Two-party-preferred result
Country	Nathaniel Barclay	14,279	74.5	+4.2
Labor	Douglas Burgess	4,903	25.5	−4.2
Country hold		Swing	+4.2	

=== Moonee Ponds ===
1961 Victorian state election: Moonee Ponds
Party	Candidate	Votes	%	±%
Labor	Tom Edmunds	7,724	41.5	+3.8
Liberal and Country	Jack Holden	7,222	38.8	−3.1
Democratic Labor	Paul Gunn	3,360	18.1	−0.3
Independent	Peter Kirchner	306	1.6	+1.6
Total formal votes		18,612	97.2	−1.1
Informal votes		529	2.8	+1.1
Turnout		19,141	94.6	−0.3
Two-party-preferred result
Liberal and Country	Jack Holden	10,406	55.9	−4.5
Labor	Tom Edmunds	8,206	44.1	+4.5
Liberal and Country hold		Swing	−4.5	

=== Moorabbin ===
1961 Victorian state election: Moorabbin
Party	Candidate	Votes	%	±%
Labor	Les Coates	11,164	38.4	−0.8
Liberal and Country	Llew Reese	7,389	25.4	−23.3
Independent Liberal	Bob Suggett	6,267	21.6	+21.6
Democratic Labor	James Healy	4,220	14.5	+2.4
Total formal votes		29,040	98.4	0.0
Informal votes		472	1.6	0.0
Turnout		29,512	95.8	+0.8
Two-candidate-preferred result
Independent Liberal	Bob Suggett	17,051	58.7	+58.7
Labor	Les Coates	11,989	41.3	+0.7
Independent Liberal gain from Liberal and Country		Swing	N/A	

=== Mornington ===
1961 Victorian state election: Mornington
Party	Candidate	Votes	%	±%
Liberal and Country	Roberts Dunstan	14,856	57.5	−6.0
Labor	Brian Pigott	6,854	26.6	−9.9
Democratic Labor	John Cass	4,108	15.9	+15.9
Total formal votes		25,818	98.3	−0.1
Informal votes		455	1.7	+0.1
Turnout		26,273	93.2	+0.2
Two-party-preferred result
Liberal and Country	Roberts Dunstan	18,148	71.1	+7.6
Labor	Brian Pigott	7,670	28.9	−7.6
Liberal and Country hold		Swing	+7.6	

=== Morwell ===
1961 Victorian state election: Morwell
Party	Candidate	Votes	%	±%
Labor	George Brown	9,267	43.5	−1.7
Liberal and Country	Jim Balfour	6,767	31.8	−9.9
Democratic Labor	Leslie Hilton	2,747	12.9	−0.2
Country	John Vinall	2,526	11.9	+11.9
Total formal votes		21,307	97.7	−0.8
Informal votes		509	2.3	+0.8
Turnout		21,816	95.1	+0.4
Two-party-preferred result
Liberal and Country	Jim Balfour	10,995	51.6	−1.1
Labor	George Brown	10,312	48.4	+1.1
Liberal and Country hold		Swing	−1.1	

=== Mulgrave ===
1961 Victorian state election: Mulgrave
Party	Candidate	Votes	%	±%
Liberal and Country	Ray Wiltshire	20,478	47.8	−2.1
Labor	Vincent Scully	15,610	36.4	−0.6
Democratic Labor	Leo Sparrow	6,840	15.9	+2.8
Total formal votes		42,928	98.3	−0.1
Informal votes		736	1.7	+0.1
Turnout		43,664	94.9	+0.4
Two-party-preferred result
Liberal and Country	Ray Wiltshire	26,456	61.6	+1.1
Labor	Vincent Scully	16,472	38.4	−1.1
Liberal and Country hold		Swing	+1.1	

=== Murray Valley ===
1961 Victorian state election: Murray Valley
Party	Candidate	Votes	%	±%
Country	George Moss	10,437	48.6	−10.2
Labor	Ronald Kirby	5,750	26.8	+0.1
Democratic Labor	John Patterson	3,194	14.9	+0.4
Liberal and Country	Bruno Marmo	2,116	9.8	+9.8
Total formal votes		21,497	97.4	−0.9
Informal votes		584	2.6	+0.9
Turnout		22,081	95.8	+0.7
Two-party-preferred result
Country	George Moss	15,078	70.1	−1.0
Labor	Ronald Kirby	6,419	29.9	+1.0
Country hold		Swing	−1.0	

=== Northcote ===
1961 Victorian state election: Northcote
Party	Candidate	Votes	%	±%
Labor	Frank Wilkes	10,551	57.0	−2.9
Democratic Labor	Jack Little	4,620	24.9	+1.7
Liberal and Country	Julian Sullivan	3,349	18.1	+1.1
Total formal votes		18,520	96.8	−1.2
Informal votes		614	3.2	+1.2
Turnout		19,134	94.9	+0.9
Two-party-preferred result
Labor	Frank Wilkes	11,244	60.7	−2.6
Liberal and Country	Julian Sullivan	7,276	39.3	+2.6
Labor hold		Swing	−2.6	

- The two candidate preferred vote was not counted between the Labor and DLP candidates for Northcote.

=== Oakleigh ===
1961 Victorian state election: Oakleigh
Party	Candidate	Votes	%	±%
Labor	Val Doube	9,842	45.5	−4.5
Liberal and Country	Alan Scanlan	8,648	39.9	+1.3
Democratic Labor	Morris Kinnane	3,165	14.6	+3.2
Total formal votes		21,655	98.4	−0.4
Informal votes		356	1.6	+0.4
Turnout		22,011	95.1	−0.4
Two-party-preferred result
Liberal and Country	Alan Scanlan	11,360	52.5	+4.2
Labor	Val Doube	10,295	47.5	−4.2
Liberal and Country gain from Labor		Swing	+4.2	

=== Ormond ===
1961 Victorian state election: Ormond
Party	Candidate	Votes	%	±%
Liberal and Country	Joe Rafferty	11,214	48.4	−1.0
Labor	Kenneth Stone	8,075	34.8	+1.1
Democratic Labor	Robert Semmel	3,896	16.8	+1.7
Total formal votes		23,185	98.0	−0.3
Informal votes		453	2.0	+0.3
Turnout		23,638	95.3	−0.1
Two-party-preferred result
Liberal and Country	Joe Rafferty	13,477	63.2	−0.9
Labor	Kenneth Stone	8,526	36.8	+0.9
Liberal and Country hold		Swing	−0.9	

=== Polwarth ===
1961 Victorian state election: Polwarth
Party	Candidate	Votes	%	±%
Liberal and Country	Tom Darcy	9,983	42.7	+2.2
Labor	Edwin Morris	6,066	26.0	+2.3
Country	Lloyd Kidman	3,673	15.7	−7.7
Democratic Labor	Alan Bruce	3,630	15.5	+3.1
Total formal votes		23,352	98.4	−0.5
Informal votes		380	1.6	+0.5
Turnout		23,732	95.7	0.0
Two-party-preferred result
Liberal and Country	Tom Darcy	16,718	71.6	−1.0
Labor	Edwin Morris	6,634	28.4	+1.0
Liberal and Country hold		Swing	−1.0	

=== Portland ===
1961 Victorian state election: Portland
Party	Candidate	Votes	%	±%
Labor	George Gowty	7,163	33.1	−3.9
Liberal and Country	George Gibbs	7,160	33.1	−13.3
Democratic Labor	John Russell	4,056	18.8	+2.2
Country	Stewart Price	3,255	15.1	+15.1
Total formal votes		21,634	98.7	−0.6
Informal votes		291	1.3	+0.6
Turnout		21,925	96.4	+0.3
Two-party-preferred result
Liberal and Country	George Gibbs	13,477	62.3	+2.3
Labor	George Gowty	8,157	37.7	−2.3
Liberal and Country hold		Swing	+2.3	

=== Prahran ===
1961 Victorian state election: Prahran
Party	Candidate	Votes	%	±%
Labor	George Gahan	7,430	45.3	+2.0
Liberal and Country	Sam Loxton	6,839	41.7	−2.0
Democratic Labor	Gordon Haberman	2,137	13.0	0.0
Total formal votes		16,406	97.1	−0.8
Informal votes		486	2.9	+0.8
Turnout		16,892	92.3	+0.1
Two-party-preferred result
Liberal and Country	Sam Loxton	8,648	52.7	−2.2
Labor	George Gahan	7,758	47.3	+2.2
Liberal and Country hold		Swing	−2.2	

=== Preston ===
1961 Victorian state election: Preston
Party	Candidate	Votes	%	±%
Labor	Charlie Ring	13,435	54.8	+0.7
Democratic Labor	Michael Lucy	5,904	24.1	+0.4
Liberal and Country	Colin Pritchard	5,168	21.1	−1.1
Total formal votes		24,507	97.5	−0.3
Informal votes		619	2.5	+0.3
Turnout		25,126	94.8	0.0
Two-party-preferred result
Labor	Charlie Ring	14,320	58.4	+0.8
Liberal and Country	Colin Pritchard	10,187	41.6	−0.8
Labor hold		Swing	+0.8	

- The two candidate preferred vote was not counted between the Labor and DLP candidates for Preston.

=== Reservoir ===
1961 Victorian state election: Reservoir
Party	Candidate	Votes	%	±%
Labor	Harry Jenkins	14,110	54.8	−4.9
Democratic Labor	Frederick Whitling	5,656	22.0	+6.3
Liberal and Country	David Welsh	4,909	19.1	−5.6
Communist	John Arrowsmith	1,066	4.1	+4.1
Total formal votes		25,741	97.1	−1.1
Informal votes		763	2.9	+1.1
Turnout		26,504	96.1	+0.9
Two-party-preferred result
Labor	Harry Jenkins	15,918	61.8	−0.2
Liberal and Country	David Welsh	9,823	38.2	+0.2
Labor hold		Swing	−0.2	

- The two candidate preferred vote was not counted between the Labor and DLP candidates for Reservoir.

=== Richmond ===
1961 Victorian state election: Richmond
Party	Candidate	Votes	%	±%
Labor	Bill Towers	9,281	61.0	+7.9
Democratic Labor	Leo Gardner	3,922	25.8	−9.4
Liberal and Country	John Ridge	1,236	8.1	−2.8
Communist	Harry Bocquet	789	5.2	+5.2
Total formal votes		15,228	94.4	−2.7
Informal votes		905	5.6	+2.7
Turnout		16,133	91.5	−1.7
Two-party-preferred result
Labor	Bill Towers	10,575	69.5	+10.3
Liberal and Country	John Ridge	4,653	30.5	−10.3
Labor hold		Swing	+10.3	

- The two candidate preferred vote was not counted between the Labor and DLP candidates for Richmond.

=== Ringwood ===
1961 Victorian state election: Ringwood
Party	Candidate	Votes	%	±%
Liberal and Country	Jim Manson	15,882	47.6	−2.0
Labor	David Ould	12,346	37.0	−2.3
Democratic Labor	William Johnson	5,134	15.4	+4.3
Total formal votes		33,362	98.4	−0.3
Informal votes		548	1.6	+0.3
Turnout		33,910	96.0	+1.3
Two-party-preferred result
Liberal and Country	Jim Manson	20,530	61.5	+2.3
Labor	David Ould	12,832	38.5	−2.3
Liberal and Country hold		Swing	+2.3	

=== Ripponlea ===
1961 Victorian state election: Ripponlea
Party	Candidate	Votes	%	±%
Liberal and Country	Edgar Tanner	8,166	47.7	−2.4
Labor	Steven Goldberg	6,009	35.1	+0.4
Democratic Labor	Michael Cunneen	2,946	17.2	+2.0
Total formal votes		17,121	96.7	−0.4
Informal votes		589	3.3	+0.4
Turnout		17,710	90.8	+0.5
Two-party-preferred result
Liberal and Country	Edgar Tanner	10,343	60.4	−2.6
Labor	Steven Goldberg	6,778	39.6	+2.6
Liberal and Country hold		Swing	−2.6	

=== Rodney ===
1961 Victorian state election: Rodney
Party	Candidate	Votes	%	±%
Country	Richard Brose	9,569	45.6	−22.9
Liberal and Country	Francis Charlton	4,683	22.3	+22.3
Democratic Labor	Spencer Broom	3,635	17.3	−14.2
Labor	Neil Frankland	3,100	14.7	+14.7
Total formal votes		20,987	97.6	−0.3
Informal votes		432	2.4	+0.3
Turnout		21,419	95.6	−0.2
Two-candidate-preferred result
Country	Richard Brose	11,765	56.1	−12.4
Liberal and Country	Francis Charlton	9,222	43.9	+43.9
Country hold		Swing	N/A	

=== St Kilda ===
1961 Victorian state election: St Kilda
Party	Candidate	Votes	%	±%
Liberal and Country	Baron Snider	7,537	46.5	−0.4
Labor	Leslie Atherton	6,329	39.0	−0.1
Democratic Labor	John Hughes	2,348	14.5	+0.5
Total formal votes		16,214	96.7	−0.4
Informal votes		557	3.3	+0.4
Turnout		16,771	90.3	−0.1
Two-party-preferred result
Liberal and Country	Baron Snider	9,466	58.4	+0.6
Labor	Leslie Atherton	6,748	41.6	−0.6
Liberal and Country hold		Swing	+0.6	

=== Sandringham ===
1961 Victorian state election: Sandringham
Party	Candidate	Votes	%	±%
Liberal and Country	Murray Porter	12,563	49.7	−2.7
Labor	Kenneth Farrall	9,181	36.3	+0.9
Democratic Labor	John Ryan	3,532	14.0	+1.8
Total formal votes		25,276	98.5	−0.1
Informal votes		383	1.5	+0.1
Turnout		25,659	95.7	+1.7
Two-party-preferred result
Liberal and Country	Murray Porter	15,797	62.5	−0.2
Labor	Kenneth Farrall	9,479	37.5	+0.2
Liberal and Country hold		Swing	−0.2	

=== Scoresby ===
1961 Victorian state election: Scoresby
Party	Candidate	Votes	%	±%
Liberal and Country	Bill Borthwick	14,023	49.2	−8.5
Labor	Ronald Wanklin	11,007	38.6	+6.1
Democratic Labor	George Noone	3,498	12.3	+2.5
Total formal votes		28,528	98.3	−0.3
Informal votes		504	1.7	+0.3
Turnout		29,032	94.8	+1.6
Two-party-preferred result
Liberal and Country	Bill Borthwick	17,060	59.8	−6.3
Labor	Ronald Wanklin	11,468	40.2	+6.3
Liberal and Country hold		Swing	−6.3	

=== Swan Hill ===
1961 Victorian state election: Swan Hill
Party	Candidate	Votes	%	±%
Country	Herbert Hilton	5,041	27.4	+27.4
Country	Harold Stirling	4,514	24.5	−42.9
Liberal and Country	Gordon Harrison	3,494	19.0	+19.0
Democratic Labor	John McMahon	2,415	13.1	+13.1
Labor	Clarence Wohlers	1,812	9.8	+9.8
Independent Liberal	John Hipworth	1,150	6.2	−26.4
Total formal votes		18,426	97.0	−0.9
Informal votes		566	3.0	+0.9
Turnout		18,992	96.4	+1.1
Two-party-preferred result
Country	Harold Stirling	15,740	85.4	−1.0
Labor	Clarence Wohlers	2,686	14.6	+1.0
Two-candidate-preferred result
Country	Harold Stirling	11,087	60.2	−7.2
Country	Herbert Hilton	7,339	39.8	+39.8
Country hold		Swing	N/A	

=== Toorak ===
1961 Victorian state election: Toorak
Party	Candidate	Votes	%	±%
Liberal and Country	Horace Petty	11,356	73.7	+12.2
Democratic Labor	John Speed	4,054	26.3	+26.3
Total formal votes		15,410	91.0	−7.0
Informal votes		1,428	9.0	+7.0
Turnout		16,838	89.8	−1.2
Liberal and Country hold		Swing	N/A	

=== Williamstown ===
1961 Victorian state election: Williamstown
Party	Candidate	Votes	%	±%
Labor	Larry Floyd	12,236	70.2	+1.7
Democratic Labor	John Twomey	2,703	15.5	+1.3
Liberal and Country	Neil McNeill	1,929	11.1	−3.6
Communist	William Smith	570	3.3	+0.6
Total formal votes		17,438	96.9	−1.0
Informal votes		563	3.1	+1.0
Turnout		18,001	93.8	−0.7
Two-party-preferred result
Labor	Larry Floyd	13,154	75.4	+2.4
Liberal and Country	Neil McNeill	4,284	24.6	−2.4
Labor hold		Swing	+2.4	

- The two candidate preferred vote was not counted between the Labor and DLP candidates for Williamstown.

=== Yarraville ===
1961 Victorian state election: Yarraville
Party	Candidate	Votes	%	±%
Labor	Roy Schintler	13,459	67.1	+4.4
Democratic Labor	Alfred Gerrard	4,488	22.4	+8.7
Liberal and Country	Neal Grieg	2,100	10.5	+1.2
Total formal votes		20,047	96.5	−1.2
Informal votes		718	3.5	+1.2
Turnout		20,765	95.0	−0.2
Two-party-preferred result
Labor	Roy Schintler	14,133	70.5	−7.1
Liberal and Country	Neal Grieg	5,914	29.5	+7.1
Labor hold		Swing	−7.1	

- The two candidate preferred vote was not counted between the Labor and DLP candidates for Yarraville.

== See also ==
- 1961 Victorian state election
- Members of the Victorian Legislative Assembly, 1961–1964
