= George Thomas Gahan =

Australian politician and Victorian amateur boxer

Cr. George Thomas Gahan JP
- Mayor George Gahan in 1965 with First Lady of Prahran Janet Irene Gahan née Sheppard, Herald & Weekly Times Limited portrait collection
- Born: 21 July 1912; Inglewood, Victoria, Australia
- Died: 24 June 1980 (aged 67); Prahran, Victoria
- Resting place: Springvale Botanical Cemetery
- Title: Mayor of Prahran
- Term: 1965-1966, 1970-1971
- Political party: Labor Party, Independent
- Board member of: Victorian Amateur Boxing Association

Cr. George Tomas Gahan JP (21 July 1912 – 24 June 1980) was an Australian politician and Victorian amateur boxer. He was born in Inglewood, Victoria to Benjamin Edward Gahan and Emma Gahan née Walker. The Gahan family later moved to the Melbourne suburb of Prahran where George became a building contractor.

At a young age George began training as an amateur boxer. In his mid 30s, Gahan attempted to join the Australian Army and defend his country in World War II. Despite being rejected by army due to a duodenal ulcer, Gahan applied a second time, only be to turned away again. This tenacious streak proved to be a valuable attribute as George again turned his focus towards amateur boxing, winning a Yarraville boxing competition and in 1949 in the final of the Welter division was beaten by the Australian champion Bill Seewitz.

George had his last fight at 42 years of age when he was stopped in the 2nd round by his opponent 20 years his junior. George's tenacity and fighting talent soon shifted from the boxing ring to the political arena, becoming known as Prahran's George the Giant Killer.

From 1957 to 1959, George Gahan was the president of the Prahran-South Yarra branch of the Helping Hand League of Victoria; now known as Inclusion Melbourne.

== Political career ==
=== City of Prahran ===
Councillor

- 1958–1973

Mayor

- 1965/66
- 1970/71

Determined to fight for a seat on the City of Prahran council to improve its service to the people of the area, George Gahan became the Labor Party candidate for the South Yarra Ward in 1954. His campaign slogan was Vote for George the Giant Killer – Vote George Gahan 1. Former mayor of Prahran Fred Farrall recalled:

Up until 1953 all appeared quiet on the Town Hall front ... But one morning when I was walking to the railway station along Osborne Street on my way to work, I noticed a Holden utility advertising a chap named George Gahan as the Labor candidate for the South Yarra ward in the forthcoming elections. It attracted me because of the working Vote for George the Giant Killer – Vote George Gahan 1. I thought that was great, and made up my mind there and then, or by the time I reached the station, that I would offer the 'Giant Killer' my support.

Gahan was defeated in 1954, and again in 1955, 1956, and 1957. In 1958, despite having lost the council election four times previously, Gahan's tenacity drove him to once again make an attempt to be elected by the residents of South Yarra ward; it was this last attempt that proved successful. For fifteen years Cr. George Gahan represented South Yarra on the Prahran City council. Gahan was elected mayor of Prahran twice, in 1965 and 1970.

=== Victorian State Parliament ===
==== 1955 Independent Candidate for Toorak ====
George Gahan ran as an Independent candidate for the seat of Toorak at the May 28 1955 Victorian State Election. The Australian Labor Party split of 1955 had triggered events that caused a state election in May that year. Neither the anti-communist 'Barry Labor' or the John Cain led Labor Party ran candidates in Toorak. Gahan came in second to the sitting Liberal and Country Party member Horace Petty, and beat the Victorian Liberal Party candidate Geoffrey Kiddle.

1955 Victorian state election: Toorak
Party	Candidate	Votes	%	±%
Liberal and Country	Horace Petty	10,408	64.2	
Independent	George Gahan	3,578	22.1	
Victorian Liberal	Geoffrey Kiddle	2,225	13.7	
Total formal votes		16,211	95.9	
Informal votes		698	4.1	
Turnout		16,909	91.4	
Two-candidate-preferred result
Liberal and Country	Horace Petty	12,077	74.5	
Independent	George Gahan	4,134	25.5	
Liberal and Country hold		Swing		

From Results of the Victorian state election, 1955 (Legislative Assembly L-Z)

==== 1961 Labor Candidate for Prahran ====
George Gahan was elected by the Labor Party to be their candidate for the 1961 Victorian Legislative Assembly seat of Prahran. Prahran had been held by the Liberal Party and Australian Cricket champion and Sam Loxton since 1955. On May Day 1961 George Gahan declared: "The hour is right for a dramatic rise of the Labor Party ready and willing to work for a new deal for workers".

Cr. Gahan campaigned in Prahran against the conservative Victorian government of Sir Henry Bolte and their record on housing and unemployment. In his May Day address Gahan declared:

The Premier is a very worried little man these days with the knowledge that 22 of his 30 seats in the House depend on the preferences of splinter groups. The hour is right for a dramatic rise of the Labor party ready and willing to work for a new deal for workers. The economy is going on to the rocks. Almost 100,000 workers are unemployed and thousands more are working part time. Prices are rising daily while wages remain at a low level.

George Gahan was not only concerned for the workers and unemployed, he actively campaigned for the many pensioners of Prahran, who he argued were facing rising rents and were increasingly being evicted from their homes. According to Gahan, "Some businessmen gave money to the Bolte government to enable it to assist they payment of pensioners rents and help it bluff its way through the elections".

On election day Labor's George Gahan received the largest number of votes, achieving 45.29% of the primary vote, ahead of the sitting Liberal Party member Sam Loxton whose primary vote fell to 41.69%. Despite winning the popular vote, George lost the election due to the preferential voting method used in Victorian state elections. The Liberal Party was aided by preferences from the Democratic Labor Party (DLP), which had broken away from the Labor Party during the 1950s claiming that the root organisation was too soft towards communism; fears of left-wing influence was causing great concern in Australian society at the time.

After DLP preferences were counted the Liberal Party's Sam Loxton won with a reduced two party preferred vote of 52.71%. While the hour may have indeed been right for a "dramatic rise of the Labor Party" in Victoria, George's vision was not realized until two years after his death when the Australian Labor Party regained the Victorian Government in 1982.

1961 Victorian state election: Prahran
Party	Candidate	Votes	%	±%
Labor	George Gahan	7,430	45.3	+2.0
Liberal and Country	Sam Loxton	6,839	41.7	−2.0
Democratic Labor	Gordon Haberman	2,137	13.0	0.0
Total formal votes		16,406	97.1	−0.8
Informal votes		486	2.9	+0.8
Turnout		16,892	92.3	+0.1
Two-party-preferred result
Liberal and Country	Sam Loxton	8,648	52.7	−2.2
Labor	George Gahan	7,758	47.3	+2.2
Liberal and Country hold		Swing	−2.2	

From Results of the Victorian state election, 1961 (Legislative Assembly L-Z)

Election Scandals

As the Cold War dragged on, the Australian Leftwing remained deeply divided and the split within the Australian Labor Party continued to grow. Labor Party candidates were not only being challenged by the conservative Liberal Party, but were facing a major challenge from their former comrades who had split and joined the increasingly powerful Democratic Labor Party. This provided fertile ground for a boisterous and scandalous 1961 Victorian State election campaign.

Several days before the 1961 Victorian election, the Victorian Premier Henry Bolte gave an address at a Liberal Party election forum being held in the Prahran Town Hall on Chapel Street. Just before the meeting at Prahran Town Hall opened, a Labor party 'street meeting' was held near the town hall. As the Premier began to address and audience of 500 citizens gathered at Prahran Town Hall, the meeting descended into chaos and speakers' voices were drowned out by continuous heckling. As Premier Bolte attempted to deliver his speech over the noise of hecklers, the public address system and national radio broadcast broke down. The Premier later declared that the radio and speaker systems had been victim to sabotage. As scuffles and arguments broke out at the public gathering, four policemen intervened with one man being escorted from the Prahran Town Hall by police. The Premier Henry Bolte declared it a wicked attempt to keep him off the air pointing the finger directly at the Labor Party of Prahran and suggesting that there were more Labor supporters at his meeting than had ever attended a meeting for the leader of the opposition Mr Stoneham. Sir Henry Bolte told the press:

Look at this rabbel, this is the Labor Party. They are here tonight to disrupt this meeting simply because they know that Sam Loxton will win Prahran. They are a poor lot of losers. The people of Victoria wouldn't hand over to this spectacle we have here...This is the element which would ask you to let them govern the state. They are booing everything that is decent.

Election Day Court Injunction

In 1961, the common understanding of the abbreviation L.C.P in Victoria was that of the Liberal and County Parties. On the day of the Victorian state election in 1961 how-to-vote cards baring the words Vote with the L.C.P and printed in the Liberal and Country Party colours of red, white and blue were distributed at polling booths in the seat of Prahran. However, instead of directing people to vote for the Liberal Country Parties' candidate Sam Loxton, they directed people to vote for Cr. George Gahan. The card also bore the words: Authorised by E. M. Bennett, 415 Malvern Road, Prahran, President of Ladies' Campaign Panel of Ratepayers' Association. Voters who were intending to vote for the Liberal and Country Parties' (L.C.P) candidate picked up the Ladies Campaign Panel card and voted instead for Labor's George Gahan.

After an hour and a quarter of voting a female voter at Prahran town hall made a complaint about the misleading how-to-vote cards. In an unprecedented move in Victorian electoral history, Justice Adam issued a court injunction restraining Mrs Bennett from publishing the misleading how-to-vote cards and ordered police to stop anyone distributing them. The Liberal Country Parties' candidate Sam Loxton said the injunction was too late and that much of the damage would have already been done.

Despite the Ladies Campaign Panel being a part of the "Prahran Ratepayers Association" of which George Gahan was the president, no link between the misleading how-to-vote cards and the Labor Party or George Gahan was ever proven. When asked about the incident all George Gahan said that it was only unfortunate that his name appeared first on the cards.

== Political descendants ==
Two of Gahan's sons became councillors on the City of Prahran, and his grandson was a known political lobbyist for lesbian and gay rights.

- Cr. Christopher Charles E. Gahan – Oldest son of Cr. George Gahan. Was first elected to Prahran City council in 1963. Chris Gahan was elected to Prahran City council again in 1966–1972 and in 1979–1994. Like his father, Chris Gahan was elected Mayor of Prahran twice, in 1969 and 1981. In 1996 Chris Gahan was elected to the newly formed City of Stonnington where he remained for twelve years until his retirement in 2008. He was elected the Mayor of Stonnington in 1998.
- Cr. Paul Stephen Andrew Gahan – Youngest son of Cr. George Gahan. He was elected to Prahran City council in 1976 and served one term as the representative of South Yarra Ward until 1979.

== Amateur boxing ==
George Gahan was a keen amateur boxer for 24 years and became known as George 'Grandpa' Gahan. At 39, Gahan was a finalist in the Gippsland Championships in Dandenong. In 1952, at 42 years of age, he competed in his last tournament, losing to Australian champion and British Empire Games silver medallist Bill Seewitz. Gahan was elected to the board of the Victorian Amateur Boxing Association and served on it for a number of years.

== Namesakes ==
George Gahan Centre, South Yarra

- George Gahan Centre, Osbourne Street, South Yarra, Victoria.
- Gahan Court, Toorak, Victoria.
