= Hector Stoddart =

Australian politician

Hector George Stoddart (15 February 1905 – 3 May 1964) was an Australian politician.

He was born in Collingwood to furrier Robert Patterson Stoddart and Mary Rosina Geddes. He took a commission in the Australian Military Forces from 1926 to 1929 and subsequently worked as a fitter for the State Electricity Commission at Yallourn. On 18 September 1934 he married Edith Grace Hill; they had three children. From 1947 he worked as a real estate agent at Moe. In 1952 he was elected to the Victorian Legislative Assembly as the Labor member for Gippsland North. His seat was abolished in 1955 and he was defeated running for Morwell. He had served on Narracan Shire Council from 1949 to 1955 and from 1955 to 1964 was on Moe Borough Council, serving as mayor from 1956 to 1957 and from 1961 to 1962. Stoddart died at Yallourn in 1964.

Victorian Legislative Assembly
| Preceded by Bill Fulton | Member for Gippsland North; 1952–1955 | Abolished |
