= 1955 Victorian state election =

Australian state election

- 28 May 1955

65 (of the 66) seats in the Victorian Legislative Assembly 34 seats needed for a majority
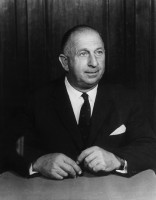

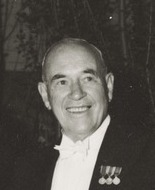

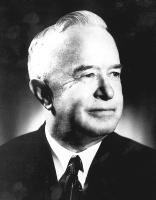
	First party	Second party
Leader	Henry Bolte	John Cain
Party	Liberal and Country	Labor
Leader since	3 June 1953	19 October 1937
Leader's seat	Hampden	Northcote
Last election	11 seats	37 seats
Seats won	33 seats	20 seats
Seat change	▲22	▼17
Popular vote	487,408	420,197
Percentage	37.78%	32.57%
Swing	▲12.93	▼16.50
TPP	57.92%	42.08%
TPP swing	▲14.64	▼14.64
	Third party	Fourth party
		(A-C)
Leader	Herbert Hyland	Bill Barry
Party	Country	Labor (A-C)
Leader since	20 April 1955	30 March 1955
Leader's seat	Gippsland South	Carlton
Last election	12 seats	New party
Seats won	11 seats	1 seat
Seat change	▼1	▲1
Popular vote	122,999	162,660
Percentage	9.53%	12.61%
Swing	▲1.19	▲12.61
Premier before election
John Cain
Labor
Elected Premier
Henry Bolte
Liberal and Country

The 1955 Victorian state election was held in the Australian State of Victoria on Saturday, 28 May 1955 to elect 65 (of the 66) members of the state's Legislative Assembly.

The incumbent Labor Party Government was defeated by the Liberal and Country Party (LCP) led by Henry Bolte with a swing of 14.6%.

The Liberal party would hold power until 1982.

== Background ==
John Cain had led the Labor Party in Victoria since 1937, and had been Premier since defeating John McDonald's Country Party led government at the 1952 election, forming the first majority Labor government in Victoria's history.

The leader of the opposition Liberal and Country Party, Trevor Oldham, had died on 2 May 1953 in a plane crash on his way to attend the coronation of Queen Elizabeth II. Oldham's deputy, Henry Bolte, succeeded him a few days later.

The election was triggered by events related to the Australian Labor Party split of 1955, in which followers of B. A. Santamaria's "Movement"—Catholic, anti-Communist, right-aligned members of the Labor Party—were accused by federal leader H. V. Evatt of contributing to his loss of the 1954 federal election to Robert Menzies. The federal executive set about expelling "disloyal" members who supported the Movement.

In the Victorian parliament, the anti-Communists were known as the Barry–Coleman group after the leaders of the faction: Bill Barry in the Legislative Assembly and Les Coleman in the Legislative Council. They were elected by the 17 Labor members suspended from the caucus at a meeting on 30 March 1955. In April 1955, Barry and Coleman wrote to Cain requesting a unity conference, but the request was rejected, with Cain telling the group that they could only achieve unity within the ALP, by accepting the authority of the Labor federal conference and executive, and the Victorian central executive.

On the night of 19 April, Bolte moved a motion of no-confidence against Cain's government in the Legislative Assembly. In the early hours of 20 April, following a twelve-hour debate, eleven anti-Communist Labor members crossed the floor to support Bolte's motion. With his government defeated, Cain sought and received a dissolution of parliament later that day.

== Key dates ==
Date	Event
20 April 1955	The Cain government was defeated in the Victorian Legislative Assembly by a motion of no-confidence.
22 April 1955	The Parliament was prorogued, and the Legislative Assembly dissolved.
26 April 1955	Writs were issued by the Governor to proceed with an election.
6 May 1955	Close of nominations.
28 May 1955	Polling day, between the hours of 8am and 6pm.
7 June 1955	Interim Bolte Ministry was sworn in.
8 June 1955	The remainder of the Bolte Ministry was sworn in.
15 June 1955	The writ was returned and the results formally declared.
15 June 1955	Parliament resumed for business.

== Results ==
=== Legislative Assembly ===
Victorian state election, 28 May 1955 Legislative Assembly << 1952–1958 >>
Enrolled voters	1,402,588				
Votes cast	1,318,934		Turnout	94.02	+0.44
Informal votes	28,955		Informal	2.19	+0.38
Summary of votes by party
Party	Primary votes	%	Swing	Seats	Change
Liberal and Country	487,408	37.78	+12.93	33	+22
Labor	420,197	32.57	−16.50	20	−17
Labor (A-C)	162,660	12.61	+12.61	1	+1
Country	122,999	9.53	+1.19	11	−1
Independent	45,570	3.53	−3.38	1	±0
Victorian Liberal	44,692	3.46	−6.13	0	−4
Communist	4,589	0.35	−0.88	0	±0
Henry George Justice	1,864	0.14	+0.14	0	±0
Total	1,289,979			66	
Two-party-preferred
Liberal and Country	755,917	57.9	+14.6		
Labor	549,233	42.1	–14.6		

Notes:

- The seat of Gippsland South was retained uncontested by Sir Herbert Hyland for the Country Party. Figures for enrolled voters and ballots cast are for contested seats only.
- The Victorian Liberal Party contested the previous election as the Electoral Reform League. The party was formed by a group of disaffected former Liberal and Country Party members who followed Thomas Hollway when he was expelled from the L&CP.
- Boundaries after the 1952 election had been redistributed, with every two state districts nesting into one federal electorate, reducing malapportionment.

== See also ==
- Candidates of the 1955 Victorian state election
- 1955 Victorian Legislative Council election
- Members of the Victorian Legislative Assembly, 1955–1958
- Members of the Victorian Legislative Council, 1955–1958
