= Malcolm Gladman =

Australian politician

Malcolm Joseph Gladman (1915 – 26 August 1987) was an Australian politician.

He was born in Warrnambool, and worked in a store and as a fruit picker and wharf labourer. He served in World War II and became a clerk with the Nestlé factory at Dennington. He was secretary of the local sub-branch of the cold storage union, and president of the Warrnambool branch of the Labor Party. In 1952 he was elected to the Victorian Legislative Assembly for Warrnambool, and from 1953 to 1955 was Assistant Minister of Lands, Soldier Settlement and Conservation. In 1955 his seat was abolished and he was defeated contesting Portland. Gladman died in 1987.

Victorian Legislative Assembly
Preceded by Ronald Mack	Member for Warrnambool; 1952–1955	Abolished
