= Electoral district of Brunswick West =

Former electoral district in the Victoria, Australia

Brunswick West Victoria—Legislative Assembly
- State: Victoria
- Created: 1955
- Abolished: 1976
- Namesake: Brunswick West
- Demographic: Metropolitan
- Coordinates: 37°46′S 144°57′E

The electoral district of Brunswick West was an electorate of the Legislative Assembly in the Australian state of Victoria.

== Members for Brunswick West ==
Member	Party	Term
Campbell Turnbull	Labor	1955–1973
Tom Roper	Labor	1973–1976

The electoral district of Brunswick was re-created in 1976 and Tom Roper became the member from 1976 to 1992.
