= Campbell Turnbull =

Australian politician

Campbell Turnbull (2 October 1898 – 18 April 1977) was an Australian politician.

He was born at Wedderburn to farmer Robert Turnbull and Jane Grauzer. After attending state schools he worked for Korong Shire Council until 1914, when he became a railway telegraph operator. He then joined the Crown Law Department, where he studied law and was called to the bar in 1931. On 26 July 1924 he married Marjorie Harriett Whyte, with whom he had two sons. He spent five years as Assistant Crown Solicitor, and specialised in industrial law. From 1952 to 1964 he served on Coburg City Council.

In 1955 Turnbull was elected to the Victorian Legislative Assembly as the Labor member for Brunswick West. He served until his retirement in 1973, and died at Brighton in 1977. His cousin Keith Turnbull was a Liberal politician.

Victorian Legislative Assembly
New seat	Member for Brunswick West; 1955–1973	Succeeded by Tom Roper
