= Jim MacDonald (politician) =

Australian politician

James David MacDonald (28 June 1917 – 6 March 1989) was an Australian politician.

Born in Bathurst, MacDonald married Valdree Mae Drewe, with whom he had three sons. He enlisted in the Australian Imperial Force in 1940, serving in New Guinea and the South Pacific until he was discharged in 1946. On his return he founded J. D. MacDonald Engineering Company, of which he was chairman and managing director. In 1955 he was elected to the Victorian Legislative Assembly as the Liberal member for Burwood, transferring to Glen Iris in 1967. He served as a parliamentary secretary from 1955 to 1976 and Chairman of Committees from 1969 to 1970. He left politics in 1976.
