= Leo Fennessy =

Australian politician

Leo Michael Fennessy (7 June 1907 – 14 February 1992) was an Australian politician.

Fennessy was born at Warrnambool to police superintendent Pierce Fennessy and Mary Kenafick. He attended St Thomas' Christian Brothers College at Clifton Hill and became a boot trader in 1922. He also farmed at Trayning, Western Australia, with his brother, until the Great Depression forced them to sell; he mined for gold at Wiluna until 1939, when he enlisted in the Australian Imperial Force, serving in the Mediterranean and Middle East Theatre from 1942 to 1944. He married Celestine Vosti on 17 February 1940, with whom he had a daughter. On his return in 1944 he was a public servant with the Navy Department until 1950, when he became an industrial officer with the Victorian Federated Clerks' Union. Fennessy increased his activity in the union movement, becoming a Trades Hall Council delegate (1950–54) and Secretary of the ACTU Commonwealth Public Service Steering Committee (1952–55). In 1955 he was elected to the Victorian Legislative Assembly as the Labor member for Brunswick East, serving as a backbencher until 1970. After leaving parliament he was Chairman of the Victorian Environment Protection Council (1970–78) and a member of the Develop Victoria Council (1972–78).
