= Electoral district of Ripponlea =

Coordinates: 37°53′S 145°00′E

Ripponlea Victoria—Legislative Assembly
- State: Victoria
- Created: 1955
- Abolished: 1967
- Namesake: Suburb of Ripponlea
- Demographic: Metropolitan

The Electoral district of Ripponlea was an electoral district of the Victorian Legislative Assembly located in the Melbourne south-east suburb of Ripponlea, Victoria. It was created in 1955 and abolished in 1967.

== Members ==
Member	Party	Term
Edgar Tanner	Liberal	1955–1967

Tanner represented Caulfield 1967 to 1976

== See also ==
- Parliaments of the Australian states and territories
- List of members of the Victorian Legislative Assembly
