= Candidates of the 1973 Victorian state election =

The 1973 Victorian state election, in Australia was held on 19 May 1973.

== Retiring Members ==
=== Labor ===
- Larry Floyd MLA (Williamstown)
- Denis Lovegrove MLA (Sunshine)
- Campbell Turnbull MLA (Brunswick West)

=== Liberal ===
- Sir Vernon Christie MLA (Ivanhoe)
- Jim Manson MLA (Ringwood)
- Sir George Reid MLA (Box Hill)
- Russell Stokes MLA (Evelyn)
- Alex Taylor MLA (Balwyn)
- Robert Trethewey MLA (Bendigo)
- Sir Gilbert Chandler MLC (Boronia)

=== Country ===
- Russell McDonald MLA (Rodney)
- George Moss MLA (Murray Valley)
- Arthur Mansell MLC (North Western)

== Legislative Assembly ==
Sitting members are shown in bold text. Successful candidates are highlighted in the relevant colour. Where there is possible confusion, an asterisk (*) is also used.

Electorate	Held by	Labor candidates	Liberal candidates	Country candidates	DLP candidates	Other candidates
Albert Park	Labor	**Val Doube**	Norman Walker		Monica McGeoch	
Ballarat North	Liberal	Jim Caddy	**Tom Evans**		Moya Schaefer	
Ballarat South	Liberal	Frank Sheehan	**Bill Stephen**	Graeme Orr	John Parkin	
Balwyn	Liberal	Joan Coxsedge	Jim Ramsay		James Marmion	
Bellarine	Liberal	Royston Lawson	**Aurel Smith**		Ray Evans	
Benalla	Country	James Scott	Vernon Dawson	**Tom Trewin**	Christopher Cody	
Benambra	Country	Ian Thomas	Henry Petty	**Tom Mitchell**	James Osmotherly	
Bendigo	Liberal	David Boyle	Daryl McClure	Peter Pritchard	Raymond Peterson	
Bennettswood	Liberal	Cyril Kennedy	**Ian McLaren**		James Tighe	
Bentleigh	Liberal	Alexander McDonald	**Bob Suggett**		Peter Madden	
Box Hill	Liberal	Keith Remington	Morris Williams		James Brosnan	John Franceschini (AP)
Brighton	Liberal	Peter Hansen	**John Rossiter**		Peter Lawlor	Frederick Funnell (AP)
Broadmeadows	Labor	**John Wilton**	Claus Salger		Francis Dowling	
Brunswick East	Labor	**David Bornstein**	William Marriott		Anthony Staunton	Jonathan Sutton (AP); George Zangalis (CPA)
Brunswick West	Labor	Tom Roper	Salvatore Gandolfo		John Flint	
Camberwell	Liberal	Colin MacLeod	**Vernon Wilcox**		Joseph Stanley	
Caulfield	Liberal	John Graham	**Sir Edgar Tanner**		Peter Grant	
Coburg	Independent	Frank Cox	Louis Mingaars		Timothy Gerrard	**Jack Mutton** (Ind)
Dandenong	Labor	**Alan Lind**	Ivan Warner		Kevin Leydon	
Deer Park	Labor	**Jack Ginifer**	Alan McGillivray		Alfred Wiśniewski	
Dromana	Liberal	Jim Snow	**Roberts Dunstan**		Elizabeth Barton	
Dundas	Labor	**Edward Lewis**	Bruce Chamberlain	Alexander McLennan	Patrick Healy	
Essendon	Liberal	Ronald Kennelly	**Kenneth Wheeler**		John Moloney	Stanley Bell (AP); Lancelot Hutchinson (DGS)
Evelyn	Liberal	Raymond Donkin	Jim Plowman		Francis Feltham	Dennis Lacey (AP)
Footscray	Labor	**Robert Fordham**	Edmond Murphy		Bert Bailey	
Frankston	Liberal	Donald Mercer	**Edward Meagher**		John Glynn	David Heath (AP)
Geelong	Liberal	John O'Brien	**Hayden Birrell**		John Timberlake	Guenter Sahr (AP)
Geelong North	Labor	**Neil Trezise**	David Roffey		James Jordan	
Gippsland East	Country	Geoffrey Cox	John Sheehan	**Bruce Evans**	Robert McMahon	
Gippsland South	Liberal	Russel Wilson	**James Taylor**	Neil McInnes	John Condon	
Gippsland West	Liberal	Miles Cahill	**Rob Maclellan**	William Belfrage; Hugh Hendry	Noel Gleeson	
Gisborne	Liberal	Ernest Jamieson	**Athol Guy**	Peter Holzgrefe	Maurice Flynn	
Glenhuntly	Liberal	Kathleen Foster	**Joe Rafferty**		Terence Farrell	Richard Franklin (AP)
Glen Iris	Liberal	Douglas Gammon	**Jim MacDonald**		Edward Cleary	Jack Hammond (AP)
Greensborough	Labor	**Bob Fell**	Monte Vale		Ernest Dobson	David Close (Ind); Flora Miller (AP)
Hampden	Liberal	Raymond Blizzard	**Tom Austin**	Alan Plant	Francis O'Brien	
Hawthorn	Liberal	Evan Walker	**Walter Jona**		Bernard Gaynor	John Worcester (AP)
Heatherton	Liberal	John Wilson	**Norman Billing**		Brian Sherman	
Ivanhoe	Liberal	John Daley	Bruce Skeggs		Kevin Barry	Patricia Robinson (AP)
Kara Kara	Labor	**Esmond Curnow**	John Radford	Roderick Boyd	Robert O'Connor	
Kew	Liberal	James Hilson	**Rupert Hamer**		Francis Duffy	
Lowan	Liberal	Arthur Rowe	**Jim McCabe**	Graeme Smith	Kevin Dunn	Clifford Dodds (Ind)
Malvern	Liberal	Andrew Homer	**Lindsay Thompson**		Edward Preece	
Melbourne	Labor	**Barry Jones**	Michael Wallwork		Anna Linard	Michele Turner (AP)
Mentone	Liberal	Ian Cathie	**Bill Templeton**		Daniel Condon	Ian Black (DGS)
Midlands	Labor	**Les Shilton**	Bill Ebery		William Mannes	
Mildura	Country	Lance Fraser	Kevin Coogan	**Milton Whiting**	John Conroy	
Mitcham	Liberal	John Hyslop	**Dorothy Goble**		Marianne Crowe	Ethel Beaumont (AP); Ray Nilsen (DGS)
Monbulk	Liberal	Vernon Allison	**Bill Borthwick**		Franciscus Hallewas	David Barford (AP)
Moonee Ponds	Labor	**Tom Edmunds**	William Lawrence		Michael McMahon	
Moorabbin	Liberal	Harry Rourke	**Llew Reese**		Salvatore Pinzone	
Morwell	Labor	**Derek Amos**	Desmond Bennett	John Vinall	Leslie Hilton	
Murray Valley	Country	Donald Boag	Robert Crosby	Bill Baxter	David Kane	
Narracan	Liberal	Wilfred Bartholomeusz	**Jim Balfour**	Alfred Bush	John Mann	
Northcote	Labor	**Frank Wilkes**	Michael Galli		Albert Dowsey	
Oakleigh	Liberal	Frank Slater	**Alan Scanlan**		Ralph Cleary	
Polwarth	Liberal	Bill Pargeter	**Cec Burgin**	John Younis	Michael Dwyer	
Portland	Labor	**Bill Lewis**	Don McKellar	Diana Silvester	Maurice Purcell	
Prahran	Liberal	Murray Pearce	**Sam Loxton**		John Johnston	
Preston	Labor	**Carl Kirkwood**	Gerard Clarke		Maurice Horwood	Timothy Galbally (Ind)
Reservoir	Labor	**Jim Simmonds**	Elizabeth McDonnell		Joseph Fitzgerald	
Richmond	Labor	**Clyde Holding**	Roger Frankel		Henry Bader	
Ringwood	Liberal	Peter Fuller	Norman Lacy		Antonio De Sousa	Dulcie Bethune (AP)
Rodney	Country	Alan Williams	James Nelms	Eddie Hann	John Evans	
St Kilda	Liberal	Robin Beaumont	**Brian Dixon**		John Hughes	Beverley Broadbent (AP)
Sandringham	Liberal	Margaret Graham	**Max Crellin**		William Leech	
Scoresby	Liberal	Alan West	**Geoff Hayes**		Michael McMahon	Murray Deerbon (AP)
Shepparton	Country	Patrick Golden	Bill Hunter	**Peter Ross-Edwards**	Arthur Garner	
Sunshine	Labor	Bill Fogarty	Ian Ryan		Mary Barnes	
Swan Hill	Country	Patricia Fraser	Alan Wood	**Henry Broad**	Rodger Donohue	
Syndal	Liberal	Christopher Miller	Ray Wiltshire		Daniel McCabe	Kenneth Mylius (AP)
Warrnambool	Liberal	Ken Sanders	**Ian Smith**	Harold Stephenson	Francis Hasell	
Williamstown	Labor	Gordon Stirling	John Coughlin		Norman Way	

== Legislative Council ==
Sitting members are shown in bold text. Successful candidates are highlighted in the relevant colour. Where there is possible confusion, an asterisk (*) is also used.

Province	Held by	Labor candidates	Liberal candidates	Country candidates	DLP candidates	Other candidates
Ballarat	Liberal	Ronald Corbett	**Vance Dickie**	Patrick Hope	William Griffin	
Bendigo	Liberal	Stewart Anderson	**Fred Grimwade**		William Drechsler	
Boronia	Liberal	Niall Brennan	Peter Block		Cornelius Gleeson	
Doutta Galla	Labor	**John Tripovich**	Frank Mott		Hubert Evans	
East Yarra	Liberal	Rosslyn Ives	**Bill Campbell**		Helen Hart	Harold Jeffrey (AP)
Gippsland	Country	Thomas Matthews	Dick Long	**Bob May**	Gregory Answorth	
Higinbotham	Liberal	Henry Woodley	**William Fry**		Frederick Skinner	
Melbourne	Labor	**Doug Elliot**	John Walsh		Gordon Haberman	
Melbourne North	Labor	**John Galbally**	Richard Alston		Christina Staunton	
Melbourne West	Labor	**Alexander Knight**	Neville Hudson		Robin Thomas	
Monash	Liberal	Jean McLean	**Charles Hider**		William Hoyne	
Northern	Country	John White	Albert Baker	**Stuart McDonald**	John Ryan	
North Eastern	Country	Edwin Ure	George Ikinger	**Keith Bradbury**	Maurice Smith	
North Western	Country	Margaret Davies	Heather Mitchell	Ken Wright	Stanley Croughan	
South Eastern	Liberal	David Bottomley	**Alan Hunt**		John Dougherty	
South Western	Liberal	Stanley Nash	**Stan Gleeson**	Gilbert Anderson	James Crockett	
Templestowe	Liberal	Frederick Davis	**Vasey Houghton**		Christopher Curtis	Geoffrey Loftus-Hills (AP)
Western	Country	Donald Grossman	Digby Crozier	**Clive Mitchell**	Alan Beattie	
