= Members of the Victorian Legislative Assembly, 1973–1976 =

- ←1970–1973 1976–1979→

This is a list of members of the Victorian Legislative Assembly from 1973 to 1976, as elected at the 1973 state election:

Name	Party	Electorate	Term in office
Derek Amos	Labor	Morwell	1970–1981
Tom Austin	Liberal	Hampden	1972–1992
Hon Jim Balfour	Liberal	Narracan	1955–1982
Bill Baxter	Country/National^{[1]}	Murray Valley	1973–1976
Norman Billing	Liberal	Heatherton	1967–1979
Hayden Birrell	Liberal	Geelong	1961–1982
David Bornstein ^{[3]}	Labor	Brunswick East	1970–1975
Bill Borthwick	Liberal	Monbulk	1960–1982
Cec Burgin	Liberal	Polwarth	1970–1985
Bruce Chamberlain	Liberal	Dundas	1973–1976
Max Crellin	Liberal	Sandringham	1970–1982
Esmond Curnow	Labor	Kara Kara	1970–1976
Hon Brian Dixon	Liberal	St Kilda	1964–1982
Hon Val Doube	Labor	Albert Park	1950–1961, 1970–1979
Hon Roberts Dunstan	Liberal	Dromana	1956–1982
Bill Ebery	Liberal	Midlands	1973–1985
Tom Edmunds	Labor	Moonee Ponds	1967–1988
Bruce Evans	Country/National	Gippsland East	1961–1992
Tom Evans	Liberal	Ballarat North	1960–1988
Bill Fogarty	Labor	Sunshine	1973–1988
Robert Fordham	Labor	Footscray	1970–1992
Jack Ginifer	Labor	Deer Park	1966–1982
Dorothy Goble	Liberal	Mitcham	1967–1976
Athol Guy	Liberal	Gisborne	1971–1979
Hon Rupert Hamer	Liberal	Kew	1971–1981
Eddie Hann	Country/National	Rodney	1973–1989
Geoff Hayes	Liberal	Scoresby	1967–1982
Clyde Holding	Labor	Richmond	1962–1977
Walter Jona	Liberal	Hawthorn	1964–1985
Barry Jones	Labor	Melbourne	1972–1977
Carl Kirkwood	Labor	Preston	1970–1988
Norman Lacy	Liberal	Ringwood	1973–1982
Alan Lind	Labor	Dandenong	1952–1955, 1969–1979
Sam Loxton	Liberal	Prahran	1955–1979
Jim MacDonald	Liberal	Glen Iris	1955–1976
Rob Maclellan	Liberal	Gippsland West	1970–2002
Ron McAlister ^{[3]}	Labor	Brunswick East	1975–1976
Jim McCabe	Country/National	Lowan	1964–1967, 1970–1979
Daryl McClure	Liberal	Bendigo	1973–1982
Neil McInnes	Country/National	Gippsland South	1973–1982
Don McKellar	Liberal	Portland	1967–1970, 1973–1985
Ian McLaren	Liberal	Bennettswood	1945–1947, 1965–1979
Edward Meagher	Liberal	Frankston	1955–1976
Tom Mitchell	Country/National	Benambra	1947–1976
Jack Mutton	Independent	Coburg	1967–1979
Jim Plowman	Liberal	Evelyn	1973–1982, 1985–1999
Hon Joe Rafferty	Liberal	Glenhuntly	1955–1979
Jim Ramsay	Liberal	Balwyn	1973–1988
Llew Reese	Liberal	Moorabbin	1967–1979
Tom Roper	Labor	Brunswick West	1973–1994
Peter Ross-Edwards	Country/National	Shepparton	1967–1991
Hon John Rossiter	Liberal	Brighton	1955–1976
Hon Alan Scanlan	Liberal	Oakleigh	1961–1979
Jim Simmonds	Labor	Reservoir	1969–1992
Bruce Skeggs	Liberal	Ivanhoe	1973–1982
Aurel Smith	Liberal	Bellarine	1967–1982
Hon Ian Smith	Liberal	Warrnambool	1967–1983, 1985–1999
Bill Stephen	Liberal	Ballarat South	1964–1979
Gordon Stirling	Labor	Williamstown	1973–1988
Bob Suggett	Liberal	Bentleigh	1955–1979
Sir Edgar Tanner	Liberal	Caulfield	1955–1976
Bill Templeton	Liberal	Mentone	1967–1985
Hon Lindsay Thompson	Liberal	Malvern	1970–1982
Neil Trezise	Labor	Geelong North	1964–1992
Tom Trewin	Country/National	Benalla	1961–1982
Monte Vale ^{[2]}	Liberal	Greensborough	1967–1970, 1973, 1973–1977
Hon Kenneth Wheeler	Liberal	Essendon	1958–1979
Milton Whiting	Country/National	Mildura	1962–1988
Hon Vernon Wilcox	Liberal	Camberwell	1956–1976
Frank Wilkes	Labor	Northcote	1957–1988
Morris Williams	Liberal	Box Hill	1973–1988
John Wilton	Labor	Broadmeadows	1962–1985
Ray Wiltshire	Liberal	Syndal	1955–1976
Alan Wood	Liberal	Swan Hill	1973–1983

^{1} The Victorian branch of the Country Party changed its name to the National Party during this parliamentary term.
^{2} The result in the electorate of Greensborough was extremely close at the 1973 election, with incumbent Liberal member Monte Vale defeating former Labor member Bob Fell by five votes. Fell appealed to the Court of Disputed Returns, which overturned the result in September. Vale defeated Fell by a larger margin at the resulting by-election on 13 October 1973.
^{3} In February 1975, the Labor member for Brunswick East, David Bornstein, resigned. Labor candidate Ron McAlister won the resulting by-election on 12 April 1975.
