= Members of the Victorian Legislative Assembly, 1970–1973 =

- ←1967–1970 1973–1976→

This is a list of members of the Victorian Legislative Assembly from 1970 to 1973, as elected at the 1970 state election:

| Name | Party | Electorate | Term in office |
|---|---|---|---|
| Derek Amos | Labor | Morwell | 1970–1981 |
| Tom Austin ^{[4]} | Liberal | Hampden | 1972–1992 |
| Hon Jim Balfour | Liberal | Narracan | 1955–1982 |
| Norman Billing | Liberal | Heatherton | 1967–1979 |
| Hayden Birrell | Liberal | Geelong | 1961–1982 |
| Hon Sir Henry Bolte ^{[4]} | Liberal | Hampden | 1947–1972 |
| David Bornstein | Labor | Brunswick East | 1970–1975 |
| Bill Borthwick | Liberal | Monbulk | 1960–1982 |
| Henry Broad | Country | Swan Hill | 1968–1973 |
| Cec Burgin | Liberal | Polwarth | 1970–1985 |
| Hon Sir Vernon Christie | Liberal | Ivanhoe | 1955–1973 |
| Arthur Clarey ^{[3]} | Labor | Melbourne | 1955–1972 |
| Max Crellin | Liberal | Sandringham | 1970–1982 |
| Esmond Curnow | Labor | Kara Kara | 1970–1976 |
| Brian Dixon | Liberal | St Kilda | 1964–1982 |
| Hon Val Doube | Labor | Albert Park | 1950–1961, 1970–1979 |
| Julian Doyle ^{[2]} | Liberal | Gisborne | 1967–1971 |
| Hon Roberts Dunstan | Liberal | Dromana | 1956–1982 |
| Tom Edmunds | Labor | Moonee Ponds | 1967–1988 |
| Bruce Evans | Country | Gippsland East | 1961–1992 |
| Tom Evans | Liberal | Ballarat North | 1960–1988 |
| Bob Fell | Labor | Greensborough | 1970–1973 |
| Robert Fordham | Labor | Footscray | 1970–1992 |
| Larry Floyd | Labor | Williamstown | 1955–1973 |
| Jack Ginifer | Labor | Deer Park | 1966–1982 |
| Dorothy Goble | Liberal | Mitcham | 1967–1976 |
| Athol Guy ^{[2]} | Liberal | Gisborne | 1971–1979 |
| Hon Rupert Hamer ^{[1]} | Liberal | Kew | 1971–1981 |
| Geoff Hayes | Liberal | Scoresby | 1967–1982 |
| Clyde Holding | Labor | Richmond | 1962–1977 |
| Walter Jona | Liberal | Hawthorn | 1964–1985 |
| Barry Jones ^{[3]} | Labor | Melbourne | 1972–1977 |
| Carl Kirkwood | Labor | Preston | 1970–1988 |
| Bill Lewis | Labor | Portland | 1970–1973 |
| Edward Lewis | Labor | Dundas | 1970–1973 |
| Alan Lind | Labor | Dandenong | 1952–1955, 1969–1979 |
| Denis Lovegrove | Labor | Sunshine | 1955–1973 |
| Sam Loxton | Liberal | Prahran | 1955–1979 |
| Jim MacDonald | Liberal | Glen Iris | 1955–1976 |
| Rob Maclellan | Liberal | Gippsland West | 1970–2002 |
| Hon Jim Manson | Liberal | Ringwood | 1955–1973 |
| Jim McCabe | Liberal | Lowan | 1964–1967, 1970–1979 |
| Russell McDonald | Country | Rodney | 1964–1973 |
| Ian McLaren | Liberal | Bennettswood | 1945–1947, 1965–1979 |
| Edward Meagher | Liberal | Frankston | 1955–1976 |
| Tom Mitchell | Country | Benambra | 1947–1976 |
| Hon George Moss | Country | Murray Valley | 1945–1973 |
| Jack Mutton | Independent | Coburg | 1967–1979 |
| Hon Joe Rafferty | Liberal | Glenhuntly | 1955–1979 |
| Llew Reese | Liberal | Moorabbin | 1967–1979 |
| Hon Sir George Reid | Liberal | Box Hill | 1947–1952, 1955–1973 |
| Peter Ross-Edwards | Country | Shepparton | 1967–1991 |
| Hon John Rossiter | Liberal | Brighton | 1955–1976 |
| Hon Sir Arthur Rylah ^{[1]} | Liberal | Kew | 1949–1971 |
| Alan Scanlan | Liberal | Oakleigh | 1961–1979 |
| Les Shilton | Labor | Midlands | 1970–1973 |
| Jim Simmonds | Labor | Reservoir | 1969–1992 |
| Aurel Smith | Liberal | Bellarine | 1967–1982 |
| Hon Ian Smith | Liberal | Warrnambool | 1967–1983, 1985–1999 |
| Bill Stephen | Liberal | Ballarat South | 1964–1979 |
| Russell Stokes | Liberal | Evelyn | 1958–1973 |
| Bob Suggett | Liberal | Bentleigh | 1955–1979 |
| Sir Edgar Tanner | Liberal | Caulfield | 1955–1976 |
| Alex Taylor | Liberal | Balwyn | 1955–1973 |
| James Taylor | Liberal | Gippsland South | 1970–1973 |
| Bill Templeton | Liberal | Mentone | 1967–1985 |
| Hon Lindsay Thompson | Liberal | Malvern | 1970–1982 |
| Robert Trethewey | Liberal | Bendigo | 1964–1973 |
| Neil Trezise | Labor | Geelong North | 1964–1992 |
| Tom Trewin | Country | Benalla | 1961–1982 |
| Campbell Turnbull | Labor | Brunswick West | 1955–1973 |
| Kenneth Wheeler | Liberal | Essendon | 1958–1979 |
| Milton Whiting | Country | Mildura | 1962–1988 |
| Hon Vernon Wilcox | Liberal | Camberwell | 1956–1976 |
| Frank Wilkes | Labor | Northcote | 1957–1988 |
| John Wilton | Labor | Broadmeadows | 1962–1985 |
| Ray Wiltshire | Liberal | Syndal | 1955–1976 |

^{1} On 5 March 1971, the Liberal member for Kew and Deputy Premier, Sir Arthur Rylah, resigned due to ill health. Liberal candidate and former East Yarra Province MLC Rupert Hamer won the resulting by-election on 17 April 1971.
^{2} In October 1971, the Liberal member for Gisborne, Julian Doyle, resigned. The Liberal candidate and former member of The Seekers, Athol Guy, won the resulting by-election in December.
^{3} On 9 May 1972, the Labor member for Melbourne, Arthur Clarey, died. Labor candidate Barry Jones was elected unopposed at the close of nominations for the resulting by-election on 9 June 1972.
^{4} On 23 August 1972, the Liberal member for Hampden and retiring Premier of Victoria, Sir Henry Bolte, resigned. Liberal candidate Tom Austin won the resulting by-election on 7 October 1972.
