= Electoral results for the district of Preston =

Victoria, Australia, district election results

This is a list of electoral results for the district of Preston in Victorian state elections.

== Members for Preston ==
Member	Party	Term
William Ruthven	Labor	1945–1955
Charlie Ring	Labor	1955–1970
Carl Kirkwood	Labor	1970–1988
Michael Leighton	Labor	1988–2006
Robin Scott	Labor	2006–2022
Nathan Lambert	Labor	2022–present

== Election results ==
=== Elections in the 2020s ===
==== 2022 ====
2022 Victorian state election: Preston
Party	Candidate	Votes	%	±%
Labor	Nathan Lambert	14,999	37.6	−14.7
Liberal	Amanda Paliouras	6,883	17.3	+0.6
Greens	Patchouli Paterson	6,027	15.1	+0.5
Independent	Gaetano Greco	5,473	13.7	+7.2
Victorian Socialists	Steph Price	2,458	6.2	+2.4
Freedom	Angelique Matias	1,150	2.9	+2.9
Reason	Carmen Lahiff-Jenkins	890	2.2	−0.7
Family First	Raouf Soliman	885	2.2	+2.2
Animal Justice	Rachel Unicomb	822	2.1	−0.8
Independent	Brian Sanaghan	270	0.7	+0.7
Total formal votes		39,857	92.2	−0.5
Informal votes		3,392	7.8	+0.5
Turnout		43,249	85.9	+0.3
Notional two-party-preferred count
Labor	Nathan Lambert	27,769	69.7	–8.6
Liberal	Amanda Paliouras	12,088	30.3	+8.6
Two-candidate-preferred result
Labor	Nathan Lambert	20,761	52.1	−19.2
Greens	Patchouli Paterson	19,096	47.9	+19.2
Labor hold		Swing	–19.2	

=== Elections in the 2010s ===
==== 2018 ====
2018 Victorian state election: Preston
Party	Candidate	Votes	%	±%
Labor	Robin Scott	19,409	51.97	+3.55
Liberal	Guido Lilio	6,083	16.29	−4.87
Greens	Susanne Newton	5,636	15.09	−1.05
Independent	Gaetano Greco	2,570	6.88	+6.88
Victorian Socialists	Stephanie Price	1,453	3.89	+3.89
Reason	Margee Glover	1,116	2.99	+2.99
Animal Justice	Nadine Richings	1,079	2.89	+2.89
Total formal votes		37,346	93.29	−1.39
Informal votes		2,687	6.71	+1.39
Turnout		40,033	88.46	−2.34
Two-party-preferred result
Labor	Robin Scott	29,318	78.50	+3.85
Liberal	Guido Lilio	8,028	21.50	−3.85
Two-candidate-preferred result
Labor	Robin Scott	26,372	70.70	−3.95
Greens	Susanne Newton	10,928	29.30	+3.95
Labor hold		Swing	−3.95	

==== 2014 ====
2014 Victorian state election: Preston
Party	Candidate	Votes	%	±%
Labor	Robin Scott	17,607	48.4	−5.5
Liberal	John Forster	7,694	21.2	−5.1
Greens	Rose Ljubicic	5,869	16.1	−3.0
Independent	Gaetano Greco	4,103	11.3	+11.3
Family First	Rachel Ward	1,091	3.0	+2.7
Total formal votes		36,364	94.7	+1.2
Informal votes		2,043	5.3	−1.2
Turnout		38,407	90.8	+0.2
Two-party-preferred result
Labor	Robin Scott	27,199	74.7	+4.5
Liberal	John Forster	9,235	25.3	−4.5
Labor hold		Swing	+4.5	

==== 2010 ====
2010 Victorian state election: Preston
Party	Candidate	Votes	%	±%
Labor	Robin Scott	17,400	52.65	−8.93
Liberal	Adin McGarvie	8,593	26.00	+5.67
Greens	Trent McCarthy	7,058	21.35	+7.67
Total formal votes		33,051	93.71	+0.49
Informal votes		2,219	6.29	−0.49
Turnout		35,270	91.23	+0.08
Two-party-preferred result
Labor	Robin Scott	23,250	70.38	−4.92
Liberal	Adin McGarvie	9,783	29.62	+4.92
Labor hold		Swing	−4.92	

=== Elections in the 2000s ===
==== 2006 ====
2006 Victorian state election: Preston
Party	Candidate	Votes	%	±%
Labor	Robin Scott	19,809	61.6	−5.1
Liberal	Peter Hammond	6,539	20.3	+1.5
Greens	Chris Chaplin	4,400	13.7	+0.4
Family First	Christopher Field	1,141	3.5	+3.5
Citizens Electoral Council	Robert Barwick	281	0.9	−0.3
Total formal votes		32,170	93.2	−2.3
Informal votes		2,339	6.8	+2.3
Turnout		34,509	91.2	
Two-party-preferred result
Labor	Robin Scott	24,222	75.3	−1.9
Liberal	Peter Hammond	7,944	24.7	+1.9
Labor hold		Swing	−1.9	

==== 2002 ====
2002 Victorian state election: Preston
Party	Candidate	Votes	%	±%
Labor	Michael Leighton	22,271	66.7	−0.5
Liberal	Lawrence Dean	6,267	18.8	−10.6
Greens	Chris Chaplin	4,458	13.3	+13.0
Citizens Electoral Council	Noelene Isherwood	415	1.2	+1.2
Total formal votes		33,411	95.5	−0.2
Informal votes		1,575	4.5	+0.2
Turnout		34,986	91.6	
Two-party-preferred result
Labor	Michael Leighton	25,785	77.2	+8.4
Liberal	Lawrence Dean	7,617	22.8	−8.4
Labor hold		Swing	+8.4	

=== Elections in the 1990s ===
==== 1999 ====
1999 Victorian state election: Preston
Party	Candidate	Votes	%	±%
Labor	Michael Leighton	20,087	67.2	+3.3
Liberal	Ruth Padgett	8,769	29.3	−4.6
Natural Law	Michael Dickins	1,052	3.5	+1.2
Total formal votes		29,908	95.7	−0.1
Informal votes		1,339	4.3	+0.1
Turnout		31,247	92.5	
Two-party-preferred result
Labor	Michael Leighton	20,522	68.6	+3.3
Liberal	Ruth Padgett	9,384	31.4	−3.3
Labor hold		Swing	+3.3	

==== 1996 ====
1996 Victorian state election: Preston
Party	Candidate	Votes	%	±%
Labor	Michael Leighton	18,890	63.8	+4.2
Liberal	Ruth Padgett	10,026	33.9	+1.7
Natural Law	Richard Barnes	685	2.3	+0.9
Total formal votes		29,601	95.8	+2.1
Informal votes		1,292	4.2	−2.1
Turnout		30,893	93.3	
Two-party-preferred result
Labor	Michael Leighton	19,332	65.3	−0.9
Liberal	Ruth Padgett	10,254	34.7	+0.9
Labor hold		Swing	−0.9	

==== 1992 ====
1992 Victorian state election: Preston
Party	Candidate	Votes	%	±%
Labor	Michael Leighton	17,403	59.6	−3.1
Liberal	George Prillwitz	9,382	32.1	+3.9
Independent	Rose-Marie Celestin	1,148	3.9	+3.9
Independent	Justin Armstrong	824	2.8	+2.8
Natural Law	Richard Barnes	427	1.5	+1.5
Total formal votes		29,184	93.7	+0.3
Informal votes		1,958	6.3	−0.3
Turnout		31,142	94.0	
Two-party-preferred result
Labor	Michael Leighton	19,278	66.2	−2.4
Liberal	George Prillwitz	9,854	33.8	+2.4
Labor hold		Swing	−2.4	

=== Elections in the 1980s ===
==== 1988 ====
1988 Victorian state election: Preston
Party	Candidate	Votes	%	±%
Labor	Michael Leighton	18,026	71.07	+1.50
Liberal	Peter Papaemmanouil	7,336	28.93	−1.50
Total formal votes		25,362	92.94	−2.84
Informal votes		1,928	7.06	+2.84
Turnout		27,290	90.40	−0.91
Labor hold		Swing	+1.50	

==== 1985 ====
1985 Victorian state election: Preston
Party	Candidate	Votes	%	±%
Labor	Carl Kirkwood	19,473	69.6	−1.5
Liberal	Mark Leaman	8,517	30.4	+20.0
Total formal votes		27,990	95.8	
Informal votes		1,234	4.2	
Turnout		29,224	91.3	
Labor hold		Swing	−5.3	

==== 1982 ====
1982 Victorian state election: Preston
Party	Candidate	Votes	%	±%
Labor	Carl Kirkwood	17,544	74.5	+3.0
Democrats	Kenneth Peak	6,015	25.5	+25.5
Total formal votes		23,559	94.6	−0.8
Informal votes		1,338	5.4	+0.8
Turnout		24,897	93.1	+1.3
Labor hold		Swing	+3.0	

=== Elections in the 1970s ===
==== 1979 ====
1979 Victorian state election: Preston
Party	Candidate	Votes	%	±%
Labor	Carl Kirkwood	17,295	71.5	+5.7
Liberal	Elie Obeid	6,890	28.5	−5.7
Total formal votes		24,185	95.4	−0.8
Informal votes		1,163	4.6	+0.8
Turnout		25,348	91.8	−0.1
Labor hold		Swing	+5.7	

==== 1976 ====
1976 Victorian state election: Preston
Party	Candidate	Votes	%	±%
Labor	Carl Kirkwood	16,869	65.8	+10.8
Liberal	John Miles	8,781	34.2	+2.4
Total formal votes		25,650	96.2	
Informal votes		1,009	3.8	
Turnout		26,659	91.9	
Labor hold		Swing	+7.1	

==== 1973 ====
1973 Victorian state election: Preston
Party	Candidate	Votes	%	±%
Labor	Carl Kirkwood	12,456	54.7	+0.2
Liberal	Gerard Clarke	7,728	33.9	+6.0
Democratic Labor	Maurice Horwood	1,786	7.8	−9.7
Independent	Timothy Galbally	814	3.6	+3.6
Total formal votes		22,784	95.2	−0.1
Informal votes		1,138	4.8	+0.1
Turnout		23,922	93.1	−1.6
Two-party-preferred result
Labor	Carl Kirkwood	13,130	57.6	+0.5
Liberal	Gerard Clarke	9,654	42.4	−0.5
Labor hold		Swing	+0.5	

==== 1970 ====
1970 Victorian state election: Preston
Party	Candidate	Votes	%	±%
Labor	Carl Kirkwood	11,958	54.5	+3.7
Liberal	Bruce Spicer	6,127	27.9	−3.0
Democratic Labor	Maurice Horwood	3,844	17.5	−0.8
Total formal votes		21,929	95.3	−0.3
Informal votes		1,071	4.7	+0.3
Turnout		23,000	94.7	−0.7
Two-party-preferred result
Labor	Carl Kirkwood	12,534	57.1	+3.6
Liberal	Bruce Spicer	9,395	42.9	−3.6
Labor hold		Swing	+3.6	

=== Elections in the 1960s ===
==== 1967 ====
1967 Victorian state election: Preston
Party	Candidate	Votes	%	±%
Labor	Charlie Ring	11,395	50.8	−2.5
Liberal	James Spicer	6,936	30.9	+3.2
Democratic Labor	Maurice Horwood	4,115	18.3	−0.3
Total formal votes		22,446	95.6	
Informal votes		1,029	4.4	
Turnout		23,475	95.4	
Two-party-preferred result
Labor	Charlie Ring	12,013	53.5	−2.8
Liberal	James Spicer	10,433	46.5	+2.8
Labor hold		Swing	−2.8	

==== 1964 ====
1964 Victorian state election: Preston
Party	Candidate	Votes	%	±%
Labor	Charlie Ring	13,417	55.6	+0.8
Liberal and Country	Henry Newland	6,000	24.9	+3.2
Democratic Labor	Michael Lucy	4,695	19.5	−4.6
Total formal votes		24,112	97.6	+0.1
Informal votes		586	2.4	−0.1
Turnout		24,698	95.2	+0.4
Two-party-preferred result
Labor	Charlie Ring	14,121	58.5	+0.1
Liberal and Country	Henry Newland	9,991	41.5	−0.1
Labor hold		Swing	+0.1	

==== 1961 ====
1961 Victorian state election: Preston
Party	Candidate	Votes	%	±%
Labor	Charlie Ring	13,435	54.8	+0.7
Democratic Labor	Michael Lucy	5,904	24.1	+0.4
Liberal and Country	Colin Pritchard	5,168	21.1	−1.1
Total formal votes		24,507	97.5	−0.3
Informal votes		619	2.5	+0.3
Turnout		25,126	94.8	0.0
Two-party-preferred result
Labor	Charlie Ring	14,320	58.4	+0.8
Liberal and Country	Colin Pritchard	10,187	41.6	−0.8
Labor hold		Swing	+0.8	

- The two candidate preferred vote was not counted between the Labor and DLP candidates for Preston.

=== Elections in the 1950s ===
==== 1958 ====
1958 Victorian state election: Preston
Party	Candidate	Votes	%	±%
Labor	Charlie Ring	13,014	54.1	
Democratic Labor	Michael Lucy	5,708	23.7	
Liberal and Country	Neville Crocker	5,355	22.2	
Total formal votes		24,077	97.8	
Informal votes		534	2.2	
Turnout		24,611	94.8	
Two-party-preferred result
Labor	Charlie Ring	13,870	57.6	
Liberal and Country	Neville Crocker	10,207	42.4	
Labor hold		Swing		

- Two party preferred vote was estimated.

==== 1955 ====
1955 Victorian state election: Preston
Party	Candidate	Votes	%	±%
Labor	Charlie Ring	11,429	52.4	
Liberal and Country	Frank Block	6,881	31.5	
Labor (A-C)	Thomas Hartnedy	3,515	16.1	
Total formal votes		21,825	97.6	
Informal votes		542	2.4	
Turnout		22,367	95.5	
Two-party-preferred result
Labor	Charlie Ring	11,955	54.8	
Liberal and Country	Frank Block	9,870	45.2	
Labor hold		Swing		

==== 1952 ====
1952 Victorian state election: Preston
Party	Candidate	Votes	%	±%
Labor	William Ruthven	unopposed		
Labor hold		Swing		

==== 1950 ====
1950 Victorian state election: Preston
Party	Candidate	Votes	%	±%
Labor	William Ruthven	17,007	64.0	+7.0
Liberal and Country	Vernon Hauser	9,561	36.0	−7.0
Total formal votes		26,568	99.2	−0.1
Informal votes		216	0.8	+0.1
Turnout		26,784	95.9	+0.3
Labor hold		Swing	+7.0	

=== Elections in the 1940s ===
==== 1947 ====
1947 Victorian state election: Preston
Party	Candidate	Votes	%	±%
Labor	William Ruthven	14,221	57.0	+9.7
Liberal	Frederick Lee	10,727	43.0	+43.0
Total formal votes		24,948	99.3	+0.8
Informal votes		174	0.7	−0.8
Turnout		25,122	95.6	+4.1
Labor hold		Swing	N/A	

==== 1945 ====
1945 Victorian state election: Preston
Party	Candidate	Votes	%	±%
Labor	William Ruthven	10,200	47.3	
Ministerial	Henry Zwar	9,779	45.3	
Independent	Albert Davis	1,590	7.4	
Total formal votes		21,569	98.5	
Informal votes		335	1.5	
Turnout		21,904	91.5	
Two-candidate-preferred result
Labor	William Ruthven	10,856	50.3	
Ministerial	Henry Zwar	10,713	49.7	
Labor gain from Liberal		Swing		
