= Electoral results for the district of Murray Valley =

Victoria, Australia, district election results

This is a list of electoral results for the Electoral district of Murray Valley in Victorian state elections.

== Members for Murray Valley ==
Member	Party	Term
George Moss	Country	1945–1973
Bill Baxter	Country	1973–1975
Bill Baxter	National Country	1975–1976
Ken Jasper	National Country	1976–1982
Ken Jasper	National	1982–2010
Tim McCurdy	National	2010–2014

== Election results ==
=== Elections in the 2010s ===
2010 Victorian state election: Murray Valley
Party	Candidate	Votes	%	±%
National	Tim McCurdy	18,357	53.83	+2.92
Labor	Lachlan Enshaw	7,065	20.72	−1.20
Independent	Roberto Paino	3,339	9.79	+9.79
Country Alliance	Peter Watson	2,668	7.82	+7.82
Greens	Doug Ralph	1,598	4.69	−0.75
Family First	Ray Hungerford	1,073	3.15	−1.00
Total formal votes		34,100	94.87	−1.43
Informal votes		1,845	5.13	+1.43
Turnout		35,945	93.75	+0.59
Two-party-preferred result
National	Tim McCurdy	23,604	69.04	−2.72
Labor	Lachlan Enshaw	10,587	30.96	+2.72
National hold		Swing	−2.72	

=== Elections in the 2000s ===
2006 Victorian state election: Murray Valley
Party	Candidate	Votes	%	±%
National	Ken Jasper	16,781	50.9	+7.8
Labor	Lauren O'Neill	7,224	21.9	−8.9
Liberal	Nick McHugh	5,795	17.6	−2.9
Greens	Carol Kunert	1,794	5.4	−0.1
Family First	Garry Duke	1,368	4.2	+4.2
Total formal votes		32,962	96.3	−0.8
Informal votes		1,265	3.7	+0.8
Turnout		34,227	93.2	
Two-party-preferred result
National	Ken Jasper	23,637	71.8	+7.9
Labor	Lauren O'Neill	9,302	28.2	−7.9
National hold		Swing	+7.9	

2002 Victorian state election: Murray Valley
Party	Candidate	Votes	%	±%
National	Ken Jasper	13,778	43.1	−22.3
Labor	Lauren O'Neill	9,846	30.8	−3.5
Liberal	Don Joyce	6,565	20.5	+20.2
Greens	Trisha Scott	1,764	5.5	+5.5
Total formal votes		31,953	97.1	+0.1
Informal votes		964	2.9	−0.1
Turnout		32,917	93.8	
Two-party-preferred result
National	Ken Jasper	20,416	63.9	−1.8
Labor	Lauren O'Neill	11,537	36.1	+1.8
National hold		Swing	−1.8	

=== Elections in the 1990s ===
1999 Victorian state election: Murray Valley
Party	Candidate	Votes	%	±%
National	Ken Jasper	20,899	65.9	−5.3
Labor	Zuvele Leschen	10,811	34.1	+8.4
Total formal votes		31,710	97.0	−1.4
Informal votes		990	3.0	+1.4
Turnout		32,700	94.0	
National hold		Swing	−6.5	

1996 Victorian state election: Murray Valley
Party	Candidate	Votes	%	±%
National	Ken Jasper	22,774	71.2	−2.8
Labor	Michelle MacDonald	8,230	25.7	−0.3
Natural Law	Patricia Jackson	974	3.0	+3.0
Total formal votes		31,978	98.4	+0.9
Informal votes		530	1.6	−0.9
Turnout		32,508	94.4	
Two-party-preferred result
National	Ken Jasper	23,154	72.4	−1.6
Labor	Michelle MacDonald	8,809	27.6	+1.6
National hold		Swing	−1.6	

1992 Victorian state election: Murray Valley
Party	Candidate	Votes	%	±%
National	Ken Jasper	22,744	74.0	+15.3
Labor	Maria Keller	7,999	26.0	+0.2
Total formal votes		30,743	97.4	−0.6
Informal votes		806	2.6	+0.6
Turnout		31,549	95.1	
National hold		Swing	+2.2	

=== Elections in the 1980s ===
1988 Victorian state election: Murray Valley
Party	Candidate	Votes	%	±%
National	Ken Jasper	17,354	58.17	−0.84
Labor	Jill Milthorpe	7,813	26.19	−0.49
Liberal	Diane Mathieson	4,664	15.63	+1.32
Total formal votes		29,831	98.09	−0.10
Informal votes		581	1.91	+0.10
Turnout		30,412	92.53	−1.57
Two-party-preferred result
National	Ken Jasper	21,286	71.37	−0.76
Labor	Jill Milthorpe	8,539	28.63	+0.76
National hold		Swing	−0.76	

1985 Victorian state election: Murray Valley
Party	Candidate	Votes	%	±%
National	Ken Jasper	16,880	59.0	+5.3
Labor	Jill Milthorpe	7,633	26.7	−3.8
Liberal	Bill Hunter	4,093	14.3	−1.3
Total formal votes		28,606	98.2	
Informal votes		526	1.8	
Turnout		29,132	94.1	
Two-party-preferred result
National	Ken Jasper	20,654	72.2	+3.9
Labor	Jill Milthorpe	7,952	27.8	−3.9
National hold		Swing	+3.9	

1982 Victorian state election: Murray Valley
Party	Candidate	Votes	%	±%
National	Ken Jasper	14,347	56.7	+6.9
Labor	Jill Millthorpe	7,685	30.4	+2.0
Liberal	William Scott	3,278	13.0	−8.9
Total formal votes		25,310	98.0	+1.6
Informal votes		512	2.0	−1.6
Turnout		25,822	95.0	+0.4
Two-party-preferred result
National	Ken Jasper	17,462	69.0	−1.5
Labor	Jill Millthorpe	7,848	31.0	+1.5
National hold		Swing	−1.5	

=== Elections in the 1970s ===
1979 Victorian state election: Murray Valley
Party	Candidate	Votes	%	±%
National	Ken Jasper	11,936	49.8	+3.4
Labor	Abigail Donlon	6,802	28.4	+2.9
Liberal	Brian Lumsden	5,242	21.9	+0.7
Total formal votes		23,980	96.4	−1.2
Informal votes		889	3.6	+1.2
Two-party-preferred result
National	Ken Jasper	16,895	70.5	−1.6
Labor	Abigail Donlon	7,085	29.5	+1.6
National hold		Swing	−1.6	

1976 Victorian state election: Murray Valley
Party	Candidate	Votes	%	±%
National	Ken Jasper	10,812	46.4	+2.0
Labor	Abigail Donlon	5,934	25.5	−3.9
Liberal	Brian Lumsden	4,942	21.2	+4.0
Democratic Labor	Patrick Payne	1,590	6.8	−2.1
Total formal votes		23,278	97.6	
Informal votes		561	2.4	
Turnout		23,839	94.9	
Two-party-preferred result
National	Ken Jasper	16,776	72.1	+3.6
Labor	Abigail Donlon	6,502	27.9	−3.6
National hold		Swing	+3.6	

1973 Victorian state election: Murray Valley
Party	Candidate	Votes	%	±%
Country	Bill Baxter	7,927	40.1	+3.3
Labor	Donald Boag	5,463	27.6	+3.9
Liberal	Robert Crosby	4,808	24.3	−3.2
Democratic Labor	David Kane	1,591	7.9	−4.1
Total formal votes		19,789	97.5	+0.5
Informal votes		496	2.5	−0.5
Turnout		20,285	92.9	−1.6
Two-party-preferred result
Country	Bill Baxter	13,717	69.3	−3.6
Labor	Donald Boag	6,072	30.7	+3.6
Country hold		Swing	−3.6	

1970 Victorian state election: Murray Valley
Party	Candidate	Votes	%	±%
Country	George Moss	6,583	36.8	−16.8
Liberal	Robert Crosby	4,909	27.5	+12.6
Labor	Valda Reid	4,231	23.7	+4.8
Democratic Labor	John Patterson	2,139	12.0	−0.6
Total formal votes		17,862	97.0	+0.1
Informal votes		557	3.0	−0.1
Turnout		18,419	94.5	0.0
Two-party-preferred result
Country	George Moss	13,016	72.9	−4.8
Labor	Valda Reid	4,846	27.1	+4.8
Country hold		Swing	−4.8	
Two-candidate-preferred result
Country	George Moss	11,041	61.8	−15.9
Liberal	Robert Crosby	6,821	38.2	+38.2
Country hold		Swing	−15.9	

=== Elections in the 1960s ===
1967 Victorian state election: Murray Valley
Party	Candidate	Votes	%	±%
Country	George Moss	9,255	53.6	−7.4
Labor	Robert Cross	3,265	18.9	+12.5
Liberal	Albert Baker	2,580	14.9	+0.4
Democratic Labor	John Patterson	2,167	12.6	−5.5
Total formal votes		17,267	96.9	
Informal votes		543	3.1	
Turnout		17,810	94.5	
Two-party-preferred result
Country	George Moss	13,419	77.7	+7.2
Labor	Robert Cross	3,848	22.3	+22.3
Country hold		Swing	+7.2	

1964 Victorian state election: Murray Valley
Party	Candidate	Votes	%	±%
Country	George Moss	13,612	60.0	+11.4
Liberal and Country	Thomas Gribben	5,112	22.5	+12.7
Democratic Labor	John Patterson	3,978	17.5	+2.6
Total formal votes		22,702	97.2	−0.2
Informal votes		645	2.8	+0.2
Turnout		23,347	95.2	−0.6
Two-candidate-preferred result
Country	George Moss	14,408	63.5	−6.6
Liberal and Country	Thomas Gribben	8,294	36.5	+36.5
Country hold		Swing	−6.6	

1961 Victorian state election: Murray Valley
Party	Candidate	Votes	%	±%
Country	George Moss	10,437	48.6	−10.2
Labor	Ronald Kirby	5,750	26.8	+0.1
Democratic Labor	John Patterson	3,194	14.9	+0.4
Liberal and Country	Bruno Marmo	2,116	9.8	+9.8
Total formal votes		21,497	97.4	−0.9
Informal votes		584	2.6	+0.9
Turnout		22,081	95.8	+0.7
Two-party-preferred result
Country	George Moss	15,078	70.1	−1.0
Labor	Ronald Kirby	6,419	29.9	+1.0
Country hold		Swing	−1.0	

=== Elections in the 1950s ===
1958 Victorian state election: Murray Valley
Party	Candidate	Votes	%	±%
Country	George Moss	12,036	58.8	
Labor	Neil Frankland	5,471	26.7	
Democratic Labor	John Patterson	2,974	14.5	
Total formal votes		20,481	98.3	
Informal votes		345	1.7	
Turnout		20,826	95.1	
Two-party-preferred result
Country	George Moss	14,564	71.1	
Labor	Neil Frankland	5,917	28.9	
Country hold		Swing		

1955 Victorian state election: Murray Valley
Party	Candidate	Votes	%	±%
Country	George Moss	11,386	57.7	
Labor	Kenneth Lenne	5,001	25.3	
Labor (A-C)	Stewart Morvell	3,344	16.9	
Total formal votes		19,731	98.6	
Informal votes		278	1.4	
Turnout		20,009	95.0	
Two-party-preferred result
Country	George Moss	14,395	73.0	
Labor	Kenneth Lenne	5,336	27.0	
Country hold		Swing		

1952 Victorian state election: Murray Valley
Party	Candidate	Votes	%	±%
Labor	William Findlay	6,846	44.8	+7.5
Country	George Moss	6,617	43.3	+4.1
Liberal and Country	James Mosbey	1,820	11.9	−11.6
Total formal votes		15,283	98.9	−0.3
Informal votes		171	1.1	+0.3
Turnout		15,454	93.9	−1.6
Two-party-preferred result
Country	George Moss	7,996	52.3	−6.9
Labor	William Findlay	7,287	47.7	+6.9
Country hold		Swing	−6.9	

1950 Victorian state election: Murray Valley
Party	Candidate	Votes	%	±%
Country	George Moss	5,697	39.2	−21.8
Labor	Neil Stewart	5,418	37.3	−1.7
Liberal and Country	James Tilson	3,423	23.5	+23.5
Total formal votes		14,538	99.2	0.0
Informal votes		113	0.8	0.0
Turnout		14,651	95.5	+2.5
Two-party-preferred result
Country	George Moss	8,609	59.2	−1.8
Labor	Neil Stewart	5,929	40.8	+1.8
Country hold		Swing	−1.8	

=== Elections in the 1940s ===
1947 Victorian state election: Murray Valley
Party	Candidate	Votes	%	±%
Country	George Moss	8,003	61.0	+24.1
Labor	Neil Stewart	5,117	39.0	−1.9
Total formal votes		13,120	99.2	+0.4
Informal votes		104	0.8	−0.4
Turnout		13,224	93.0	+7.5
Country hold		Swing	+6.3	

1945 Victorian state election: Murray Valley
Party	Candidate	Votes	%	±%
Labor	John McCabe	4,679	40.9	
Country	George Moss	4,224	36.9	
Independent Country	Percy Snowden	2,551	22.3	
Total formal votes		11,454	98.8	
Informal votes		137	1.2	
Turnout		11,591	85.5	
Two-party-preferred result
Country	George Moss	6,263	54.7	
Labor	John McCabe	5,191	45.3	
Country hold		Swing		
