= Electoral results for the district of Greensborough =

Australian district election results

This is a list of electoral results for the electoral district of Greensborough in Victorian state elections.

== Members for Greensborough ==
Member	Party	Term
Monte Vale	Liberal	1967–1970
Bob Fell	Labor	1970–1973
Monte Vale	Liberal	1973
Monte Vale	Liberal	1973–1977
Pauline Toner	Labor	1977–1989
Sherryl Garbutt	Labor	1989–1992

== Election results ==
=== Elections in the 1980s ===
1989 Greensborough state by-election
Party	Candidate	Votes	%	±%
Labor	Sherryl Garbutt	11,862	40.12	−15.95
Liberal	Margaret Brown	11,363	38.43	−5.50
Democrats	Peter Allan	4,671	15.80	+15.80
Democratic Labor	John Mulholland	706	2.39	+2.39
Independent	Barbara Gilchrist	479	1.62	+1.62
Independent	Lance Hutchinson	387	1.31	+1.31
Independent	Raelene Jones	100	0.34	+0.34
Total formal votes		29,568	96.94	+0.18
Informal votes		932	3.06	−0.18
Turnout		30,500	90.25	−3.67
Two-party-preferred result
Labor	Sherryl Garbutt	15,229	51.55	−4.52
Liberal	Margaret Brown	14,314	48.45	+4.52
Labor hold		Swing	−4.52	

1988 Victorian state election: Greensborough
Party	Candidate	Votes	%	±%
Labor	Pauline Toner	16,622	56.07	+0.98
Liberal	Robert Manuell	13,022	43.93	−0.98
Total formal votes		29,644	96.76	−1.05
Informal votes		992	3.24	+1.05
Turnout		30,636	93.92	+0.17
Labor hold		Swing	+0.98	

1985 Victorian state election: Greensborough
Party	Candidate	Votes	%	±%
Labor	Pauline Toner	14,632	55.1	+1.2
Liberal	Andrew Cove	11,930	44.9	+8.3
Total formal votes		26,562	97.8	
Informal votes		595	2.2	
Turnout		27,157	93.8	
Labor hold		Swing	−3.7	

1982 Victorian state election: Greensborough
Party	Candidate	Votes	%	±%
Labor	Pauline Toner	19,688	53.6	+5.5
Liberal	John Dobinson	13,667	37.2	−3.6
Democrats	Antony Siddons	3,373	9.2	−1.4
Total formal votes		36,728	98.6	+0.2
Informal votes		526	1.4	−0.2
Turnout		37,254	95.3	+2.4
Two-party-preferred result
Labor	Pauline Toner	21,627	58.9	+5.0
Liberal	John Dobinson	15,101	41.1	−5.0
Labor hold		Swing	+5.0	

=== Elections in the 1970s ===
1979 Victorian state election: Greensborough
Party	Candidate	Votes	%	±%
Labor	Pauline Toner	15,266	48.1	+0.8
Liberal	Ronald Turner	12,929	40.7	−12.0
Democrats	Leo Bates	3,369	10.6	+10.6
Australia	Dorothy Prout	161	0.5	+0.5
Total formal votes		31,725	98.4	+0.3
Informal votes		529	1.6	−0.3
Turnout		32,254	92.9	−0.2
Two-party-preferred result
Labor	Pauline Toner	17,091	53.9	+6.7
Liberal	Ronald Turner	14,634	46.1	−6.7
Labor gain from Liberal		Swing	+6.7	

1977 Greensborough state election
Party	Candidate	Votes	%	±%
Labor	Pauline Toner	11,551	42.7	−4.6
Liberal	William Foster	9,199	34.0	−18.6
Democrats	David Ross	4,744	17.5	+17.5
Democratic Labor	Christopher Curtis	1,591	5.9	+5.9
Total formal votes		27,085	98.6	+0.5
Informal votes		384	1.4	−0.5
Turnout		27,469	87.2	−5.9
Two-party-preferred result
Labor	Pauline Toner	14,519	53.6	+6.3
Liberal	William Foster	12,566	46.4	−6.3
Labor gain from Liberal		Swing	+6.3	

1976 Victorian state election: Greensborough
Party	Candidate	Votes	%	±%
Liberal	Monte Vale	14,648	52.7	+10.4
Labor	Brian McKinlay	13,120	47.3	+2.8
Total formal votes		27,768	98.1	
Informal votes		531	1.9	
Turnout		28,299	93.1	
Liberal hold		Swing	+1.9	

1973 Greensborough state by-election
Party	Candidate	Votes	%	±%
Liberal	Monte Vale	20,323	47.3	+4.9
Labor	Bob Fell	17,724	41.2	−2.6
Australia	Flora Miller	2,533	6.0	+0.2
Democratic Labor	Christopher Curtis	2,395	5.6	−1.0
Total formal votes		42,975	98.7	+1.0
Informal votes		559	1.3	−1.0
Turnout		43,534	88.2	−6.0
After distribution of preferences
Liberal	Monte Vale	22,269	51.8	
Labor	Bob Fell	18,053	42.0	
Australia	Flora Miller	2,653	6.2	
Liberal hold		Swing	N/A	

- Preferences were not distributed to completion.

1973 Victorian state election: Greensborough
Party	Candidate	Votes	%	±%
Labor	Bob Fell	19,155	43.8	−0.5
Liberal	Monte Vale	18,524	42.4	+6.8
Democratic Labor	Ernest Dobson	2,886	6.6	−5.6
Australia	Flora Miller	2,546	5.8	+5.8
Independent	David Close	590	1.4	+1.4
Total formal votes		43,701	97.7	−0.1
Informal votes		1,018	2.3	+0.1
Turnout		44,719	94.2	−1.2
Two-party-preferred result
Liberal	Monte Vale	21,853	50.01	+2.0
Labor	Bob Fell	21,848	49.99	−2.0
Liberal gain from Labor		Swing	+2.0	

- This result was declared void and a by-election was held on 13 October 1973, in which Monte Vale retained this seat for the Liberal party.

1970 Victorian state election: Greensborough
Party	Candidate	Votes	%	±%
Labor	Bob Fell	15,026	44.3	+1.5
Liberal	Monte Vale	12,087	35.7	−4.5
Democratic Labor	Raymond Morrissey	4,132	12.2	−4.8
Defence of Government Schools	Dorothy Frost	2,661	7.9	+7.9
Total formal votes		33,906	97.8	+0.1
Informal votes		748	2.2	−0.1
Turnout		34,654	95.4	+1.1
Two-party-preferred result
Labor	Bob Fell	17,642	52.0	+5.3
Liberal	Monte Vale	16,264	48.0	−5.3
Labor gain from Liberal		Swing	+5.3	

=== Elections in the 1960s ===
1967 Victorian state election: Greensborough
Party	Candidate	Votes	%	±%
Labor	Bob Fell	11,487	42.8	+1.6
Liberal	Monte Vale	10,800	40.2	−2.9
Democratic Labor	Bill Barry	4,566	17.0	+1.3
Total formal votes		26,853	97.7	
Informal votes		629	2.3	
Turnout		27,482	94.3	
Two-party-preferred result
Liberal	Monte Vale	14,306	53.3	−1.7
Labor	Bob Fell	12,547	46.7	+1.7
Liberal hold		Swing	−1.7	
