= Electoral results for the district of Midlands =

Victoria, Australia, district election results

This is a list of electoral results for the electoral district of Midlands in Victorian state elections.

== Members for Midlands ==
Member	Party	Term
Clive Stoneham	Labor	1945–1970
Les Shilton	Labor	1970–1973
Bill Ebery	Liberal	1973–1985

== Election results ==
=== Elections in the 1980s ===
1982 Victorian state election: Midlands
Party	Candidate	Votes	%	±%
Labor	Alan Calder	11,894	44.9	+4.0
Liberal	Bill Ebery	10,997	41.5	−7.6
National	Ian Richardson	2,172	8.2	+8.2
Democrats	George Hunter	1,421	5.4	−4.6
Total formal votes		26,484	98.2	−0.2
Informal votes		477	1.8	+0.2
Turnout		26,961	94.9	+0.8
Two-party-preferred result
Liberal	Bill Ebery	13,582	51.3	−3.7
Labor	Alan Calder	12,902	48.7	+3.7
Liberal hold		Swing	−3.7	

=== Elections in the 1970s ===
1979 Victorian state election: Midlands
Party	Candidate	Votes	%	±%
Liberal	Bill Ebery	12,069	49.1	+8.9
Labor	John Brumby	10,042	40.9	+3.9
Democrats	Janice Russell	2,457	10.0	+10.0
Total formal votes		24,568	98.4	−0.1
Informal votes		397	1.6	+0.1
Turnout		24,965	94.1	−0.7
Two-party-preferred result
Liberal	Bill Ebery	13,524	55.0	−5.7
Labor	John Brumby	11,044	45.0	+5.7
Liberal hold		Swing	−5.7	

1976 Victorian state election: Midlands
Party	Candidate	Votes	%	±%
Liberal	Bill Ebery	9,294	40.2	−0.6
Labor	Donal Harvey	8,548	37.0	−7.7
National	Clarence Rodda	4,271	18.5	+10.3
Democratic Labor	Audrey Drechsler	1,010	4.4	−1.8
Total formal votes		23,123	98.5	
Informal votes		346	1.5	
Turnout		23,469	94.8	
Two-party-preferred result
Liberal	Bill Ebery	14,031	60.7	+7.5
Labor	Donal Harvey	9,092	39.3	−7.5
Liberal hold		Swing	+7.5	

1973 Victorian state election: Midlands
Party	Candidate	Votes	%	±%
Liberal	Bill Ebery	10,959	46.2	+15.1
Labor	Les Shilton	10,851	45.7	+2.7
Democratic Labor	William Mannes	1,933	8.1	−5.0
Total formal votes		23,743	97.9	+0.1
Informal votes		503	2.1	−0.1
Turnout		24,246	94.5	+0.4
Two-party-preferred result
Liberal	Bill Ebery	12,674	53.4	+6.2
Labor	Les Shilton	11,069	46.6	−6.2
Liberal gain from Labor		Swing	+6.2	

1970 Victorian state election: Midlands
Party	Candidate	Votes	%	±%
Labor	Les Shilton	9,156	43.0	−3.1
Liberal	William Turnor	6,617	31.1	+3.8
Democratic Labor	Francis Hill	2,785	13.1	+3.5
Country	Leston Laity	2,731	12.8	−2.3
Total formal votes		21,289	97.8	+0.5
Informal votes		478	2.2	−0.5
Turnout		21,767	94.1	+1.1
Two-party-preferred result
Labor	Les Shilton	11,234	52.8	+1.8
Liberal	William Turnor	10,055	47.2	−1.8
Labor hold		Swing	+1.8	

=== Elections in the 1960s ===
1967 Victorian state election: Midlands
Party	Candidate	Votes	%	±%
Labor	Clive Stoneham	9,615	46.1	−3.7
Liberal	Douglas Johanson	5,695	27.3	−8.8
Country	Graham Brownbill	3,148	15.1	+15.1
Democratic Labor	James Bourke	2,000	9.6	−4.2
Independent	Arthur Bailey	403	1.9	+1.9
Total formal votes		20,861	97.3	
Informal votes		573	2.7	
Turnout		21,434	93.0	
Two-party-preferred result
Labor	Clive Stoneham	10,634	51.0	−1.2
Liberal	Douglas Johanson	10,227	49.0	+1.2
Labor hold		Swing	−1.2	

1964 Victorian state election: Midlands
Party	Candidate	Votes	%	±%
Labor	Clive Stoneham	10,845	48.5	−3.3
Liberal and Country	Roger McArthur	8,120	36.3	+3.2
Democratic Labor	John Timberlake	3,387	15.2	0.0
Total formal votes		22,352	98.6	+0.3
Informal votes		318	1.4	−0.3
Turnout		22,670	94.9	−1.4
Two-party-preferred result
Labor	Clive Stoneham	11,420	51.1	−3.0
Liberal and Country	Roger McArthur	10,932	48.9	+3.0
Labor hold		Swing	−3.0	

1961 Victorian state election: Midlands
Party	Candidate	Votes	%	±%
Labor	Clive Stoneham	11,424	51.8	+3.6
Liberal and Country	Keith Lewis	7,296	33.1	−5.1
Democratic Labor	John Timberlake	3,344	15.2	+1.6
Total formal votes		22,064	98.3	−0.8
Informal votes		377	1.7	+0.8
Turnout		22,441	96.3	+1.4
Two-party-preferred result
Labor	Clive Stoneham	11,925	54.1	+2.9
Liberal and Country	Keith Lewis	10,139	45.9	−2.9
Labor hold		Swing	+2.9	

=== Elections in the 1950s ===
1958 Victorian state election: Midlands
Party	Candidate	Votes	%	±%
Labor	Clive Stoneham	10,207	48.2	
Liberal and Country	James Mactier	8,103	38.2	
Democratic Labor	John Timberlake	2,877	13.6	
Total formal votes		21,187	99.1	
Informal votes		185	0.9	
Turnout		21,372	94.9	
Two-party-preferred result
Labor	Clive Stoneham	10,848	51.2	
Liberal and Country	James Mactier	10,339	48.4	
Labor hold		Swing		

1955 Victorian state election: Midlands
Party	Candidate	Votes	%	±%
Labor	Clive Stoneham	11,320	53.6	
Liberal and Country	James Mactier	7,709	36.5	
Labor (A-C)	Alexander Lee	2,094	9.9	
Total formal votes		21,123	99.1	
Informal votes		200	0.9	
Turnout		21,323	95.5	
Two-party-preferred result
Labor	Clive Stoneham	11,634	55.1	
Liberal and Country	James Mactier	9,489	44.9	
Labor hold		Swing		

1952 Victorian state election: Midlands
Party	Candidate	Votes	%	±%
Labor	Clive Stoneham	unopposed		
Labor hold		Swing		

1950 Victorian state election: Midlands
Party	Candidate	Votes	%	±%
Labor	Clive Stoneham	8,094	56.6	+6.4
Liberal and Country	Harold Boyle	5,054	35.3	+35.3
Country	John Wright	1,156	8.1	−41.7
Total formal votes		14,304	99.2	−0.2
Informal votes		113	0.8	+0.2
Turnout		14,417	96.6	+0.7
Two-party-preferred result
Labor	Clive Stoneham	8,210	57.4	+7.2
Liberal and Country	Harold Boyle	6,094	42.6	+42.6
Labor hold		Swing	+7.2	

=== Elections in the 1940s ===
1947 Victorian state election: Midlands
Party	Candidate	Votes	%	±%
Labor	Clive Stoneham	7,040	50.2	−9.4
Country	Thomas Grigg	6,979	49.8	+9.4
Total formal votes		14,019	99.4	+0.1
Informal votes		91	0.6	−0.1
Turnout		14,110	95.9	+5.0
Labor hold		Swing	−9.4	

1945 Victorian state election: Midlands
Party	Candidate	Votes	%	±%
Labor	Clive Stoneham	7,621	59.6	
Country	Thomas Grigg	5,166	40.4	
Total formal votes		12,787	99.3	
Informal votes		96	0.7	
Turnout		12,883	90.9	
Labor hold		Swing		
