= 1973 Victorian state election =

Australian state election

- 19 May 1973

All 73 seats in the Victorian Legislative Assembly and 18 (of the 36) seats in the Victorian Legislative Council 37 seats needed for a majority
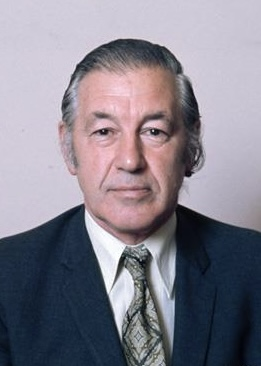

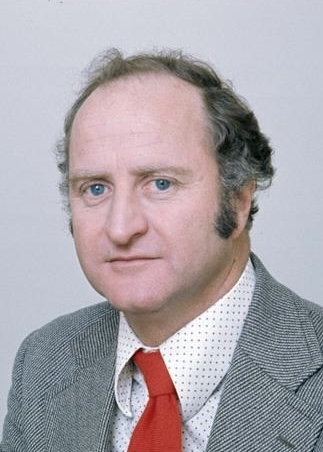

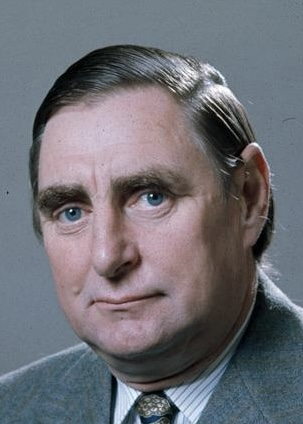
	First party	Second party	Third party
Leader	Rupert Hamer	Clyde Holding	Peter Ross-Edwards
Party	Liberal	Labor	Country
Leader since	23 August 1972	15 May 1967	17 June 1970
Leader's seat	Kew	Richmond	Shepparton
Last election	42	22	8
Seats won	46	18	8
Seat change	▲4	▼4	0
Popular vote	803,382	789,561	144,818
Percentage	42.34%	41.61%	5.96%
Swing	▲5.64	▲0.19	▼0.44
TPP	55.24%	44.76%
TPP swing	▲1.09	▼1.09
- Results in each electorate.
Premier before election
Rupert Hamer
Liberal
Elected Premier
Rupert Hamer
Liberal

The 1973 Victorian state election, held on Saturday, 19 May 1973, was for the 46th Parliament of Victoria. It was held in the Australian state of Victoria to elect the 73 members of the state's Legislative Assembly and 18 members of the 36-member Legislative Council.

Rupert Hamer succeeded Henry Bolte as Premier of Victoria on 23 August 1972. In 1972 a federal Labor government was elected, the first Labor government in 23 years. The incumbent Liberal government in Victoria led by Hamer was returned at the election with an increased vote of about 5%, largely at the expense of the Democratic Labor Party.

== Results ==
=== Legislative Assembly ===
Party	Votes	%	+/–	Seats	+/–
Liberal	803,382	41.65	▲5.64	46	▲4
Labor	789,561	40.93	▲0.19	18	▼4
Democratic Labor	147,890	7.67	▼5.51	0	Steady
Country	144,818	7.51	▼0.44	8	Steady
Australia	30,701	1.59	New	0	Steady
Defence of Government Schools	2,004	0.10	▼0.35	0	Steady
Communist	398	0.02	New	0	Steady
Independents	10,349	0.54	▼1.17	1	Steady
Total	1,929,103	100.00	–	73	–
Valid votes	1,929,103	97.15			
Invalid/blank votes	56,691	2.85	▼0.29		
Total votes	1,985,794	100.00	–		
Registered voters/turnout	2,088,984	95.06	▼1.03		
Two-party-preferred
Liberal	1,048,100	55.24	▲1.09		
Labor	849,214	44.76	▼1.09		
Total	1,897,314	100.00	–		

=== Legislative Council ===
Victorian state election, 19 May 1973 Legislative Council << 1970–1976 >>
Enrolled voters	2,088,984				
Votes cast	1,953,462		Turnout	93.5	–1.3
Informal votes	74,354		Informal	3.8	–0.2
Summary of votes by party
Party	Primary votes	%	Swing	Seats won	Seats held
Liberal	810,807	43.1	+5.5	11	21
Labor	766,181	40.8	–1.8	4	9
Democratic Labor	163,008	8.7	–5.4	0	0
Country	120,604	6.4	+0.3	3	6
Australia	18,508	1.0	+1.0	0	0
Total	1,879,108			18	36

== Seats changing hands ==
Seat	Pre-1973			Swing	Post-1973		
Seat	Party	Member	Margin	Swing	Margin	Member	Party
Dundas	Labor	Edward Lewis	3.8	-7.4	3.6	Bruce Chamberlain	Liberal
Gippsland South	Liberal	James Taylor	6.4	-6.4	0.03	Neil McInnes	Country
Greensborough	Labor	Bob Fell	2.0	-2.0	0.01*	Monte Vale	Liberal
Midlands	Labor	Leslie Shilton	2.8	-6.2	3.4	Bill Ebery	Liberal
Portland	Labor	Bill Lewis	2.8	-7.4	4.6	Don McKellar	Liberal
Swan Hill	Country	Henry Broad	20.3	-21.6	1.3	Alan Wood	Liberal

- The result for Greensborough was overturned by the Court of Disputed Returns and a by-election was called.

== Post-election pendulum ==
Liberal seats (46)
Marginal
Greensborough	Monte Vale	LIB	0.01%
Ivanhoe	Bruce Skeggs	LIB	0.3%
Swan Hill	Alan Wood	LIB	1.3% v CP
Mentone	Bill Templeton	LIB	2.2%
Essendon	Kenneth Wheeler	LIB	3.3%
Midlands	Bill Ebery	LIB	3.4%
Dundas	Bruce Chamberlain	LIB	3.6%
Heatherton	Norman Billing	LIB	4.4%
Portland	Don McKellar	LIB	4.6%
Bendigo	Daryl McClure	LIB	4.9%
Ballarat South	Bill Stephen	LIB	5.0%
Prahran	Sam Loxton	LIB	5.1%
Mitcham	Dorothy Goble	LIB	5.2%
Glenhuntly	Joe Rafferty	LIB	5.8%
Fairly safe
St Kilda	Brian Dixon	LIB	6.3%
Evelyn	Jim Plowman	LIB	6.5%
Monbulk	Bill Borthwick	LIB	6.5%
Oakleigh	Alan Scanlan	LIB	6.8%
Bennettswood	Ian McLaren	LIB	7.2%
Scoresby	Geoff Hayes	LIB	7.2%
Bellarine	Aurel Smith	LIB	7.6%
Frankston	Edward Meagher	LIB	8.0%
Gisborne	Athol Guy	LIB	8.1%
Moorabbin	Llew Reese	LIB	8.1%
Ringwood	Norman Lacy	LIB	8.1%
Geelong	Hayden Birrell	LIB	8.3%
Narracan	Jim Balfour	LIB	8.6%
Hawthorn	Walter Jona	LIB	9.2%
Bentleigh	Bob Suggett	LIB	9.5%
Safe
Caulfield	Edgar Tanner	LIB	10.0%
Syndal	Ray Wiltshire	LIB	10.6%
Box Hill	Morris Williams	LIB	10.9%
Dromana	Roberts Dunstan	LIB	11.0%
Ballarat North	Tom Evans	LIB	11.1%
Hampden	Tom Austin	LIB	12.0%
Sandringham	Max Crellin	LIB	12.7%
Glen Iris	Jim MacDonald	LIB	15.5%
Brighton	John Rossiter	LIB	17.7%
Gippsland West	Rob Maclellan	LIB	17.8%
Balwyn	Jim Ramsay	LIB	18.4%
Camberwell	Vernon Wilcox	LIB	18.5%
Warrnambool	Ian Smith	LIB	18.7%
Malvern	Lindsay Thompson	LIB	20.3%
Kew	Rupert Hamer	LIB	22.0%
Lowan	Jim McCabe	LIB	22.5%
Polwarth	Cec Burgin	LIB	24.9%

Labor seats (18)
Marginal
Kara Kara	Esmond Curnow	ALP	1.9%
Dandenong	Alan Lind	ALP	2.2%
Brunswick West	Tom Roper	ALP	3.9%
Moonee Ponds	Tom Edmunds	ALP	5.8%
Fairly safe
Preston	Carl Kirkwood	ALP	7.6%
Morwell	Derek Amos	ALP	8.3%
Reservoir	Jim Simmonds	ALP	8.7%
Safe
Northcote	Frank Wilkes	ALP	10.3%
Broadmeadows	John Wilton	ALP	10.7%
Geelong North	Neil Trezise	ALP	10.7%
Williamstown	Gordon Stirling	ALP	11.0%
Deer Park	Jack Ginifer	ALP	11.3%
Melbourne	Barry Jones	ALP	12.4%
Footscray	Robert Fordham	ALP	13.9%
Sunshine	Bill Fogarty	ALP	14.0%
Brunswick East	David Bornstein	ALP	15.0%
Albert Park	Val Doube	ALP	16.4%
Richmond	Clyde Holding	ALP	16.4%
Country seats (8)
Gippsland South	Neil McInnes	CP	0.03% v LIB
Mildura	Milton Whiting	CP	14.3%
Gippsland East	Bruce Evans	CP	17.3%
Murray Valley	Bill Baxter	CP	19.3%
Benambra	Tom Mitchell	CP	19.4%
Shepparton	Peter Ross-Edwards	CP	22.6%
Benalla	Tom Trewin	CP	24.5%
Rodney	Eddie Hann	CP	27.0%
Crossbench seats (1)
Coburg	Jack Mutton	IND	7.9% v ALP

== See also ==
- Candidates of the 1973 Victorian state election
