= Electoral results for the district of Brunswick East =

Victoria, Australia, district election results

This is a list of electoral results for the electoral district of Brunswick East in Victorian state elections.

== Members for Brunswick East ==
Member	Party	Term
Leo Fennessy	Labor	1955–1970
David Bornstein	Labor	1970–1975
Ron McAlister	Labor	1975–1976

== Election results ==
=== Elections in the 1970s ===
1975 Brunswick East state by-election
Party	Candidate	Votes	%	±%
Labor	Ron McAlister	10,366	60.5	+1.4
Liberal	John Coughlin	4,628	27.0	+0.1
Democratic Labor	Desmond Burke	1,378	8.0	−0.2
Australia	Hugh Jeffrey	777	4.5	−0.4
Total formal votes		17,149	94.8	+3.3
Informal votes		944	5.2	−3.3
Turnout		18,093	75.8	−15.3
Labor hold		Swing	N/A	

- Preferences were not distributed.

1973 Victorian state election: Brunswick East
Party	Candidate	Votes	%	±%
Labor	David Bornstein	11,878	59.1	−1.4
Liberal	William Marriott	5,200	26.9	+1.7
Democratic Labor	Anthony Staunton	1,647	8.2	−6.2
Australia	Jonathon Sutton	980	4.9	+4.9
Communist	George Zangalis	398	2.0	+2.0
Total formal votes		20,103	91.5	−1.8
Informal votes		1,874	8.5	+1.8
Turnout		21,977	91.1	−1.3
Two-party-preferred result
Labor	David Bornstein	13,072	65.0	+2.4
Liberal	William Marriott	7,031	35.0	−2.4
Labor hold		Swing	+2.4	

1970 Victorian state election: Brunswick East
Party	Candidate	Votes	%	±%
Labor	David Bornstein	12,384	60.5	+5.0
Liberal	James Guest	5,151	25.1	+1.4
Democratic Labor	Anthony Staunton	2,949	14.4	+0.3
Total formal votes		20,484	93.3	+1.0
Informal votes		1,463	6.7	−1.0
Turnout		21,947	92.4	−0.3
Two-party-preferred result
Labor	David Bornstein	12,826	62.6	+1.6
Liberal	James Guest	7,658	37.4	−1.6
Labor hold		Swing	+1.6	

=== Elections in the 1960s ===
1967 Victorian state election: Brunswick East
Party	Candidate	Votes	%	±%
Labor	Leo Fennessy	11,583	55.5	−0.4
Liberal	Anthony Wreford	4,952	23.7	+0.9
Democratic Labor	Peter McCabe	2,932	14.1	−5.8
Independent	John Daley	1,402	6.7	+6.7
Total formal votes		20,869	92.3	
Informal votes		1,737	7.7	
Turnout		22,606	92.7	
Two-party-preferred result
Labor	Leo Fennessy	12,773	61.0	+1.3
Liberal	Anthony Wreford	8,096	39.0	−1.3
Labor hold		Swing	+1.3	

1964 Victorian state election: Brunswick East
Party	Candidate	Votes	%	±%
Labor	Leo Fennessy	7,574	55.4	−8.1
Liberal and Country	Neil McDonell	2,975	21.8	+7.9
Democratic Labor	James Abikhair	2,767	20.2	−2.4
Communist	Rex Mortimer	352	2.6	+2.6
Total formal votes		13,668	93.3	−0.9
Informal votes		977	6.7	+0.9
Turnout		14,645	92.9	+0.6
Two-party-preferred result
Labor	Leo Fennessy	8,306	60.7	−6.2
Liberal and Country	Neil McDonell	5,362	39.3	+6.2
Labor hold		Swing	−6.2	

1961 Victorian state election: Brunswick East
Party	Candidate	Votes	%	±%
Labor	Leo Fennessy	9,385	63.5	+5.6
Democratic Labor	Allan Swain	3,337	22.6	+4.3
Liberal and Country	Warren Mills	2,059	13.9	−10.0
Total formal votes		14,781	94.2	−3.0
Informal votes		902	5.8	+3.0
Turnout		15,683	92.3	−0.6
Two-party-preferred result
Labor	Leo Fennessy	9,896	66.9	+6.3
Liberal and Country	Warren Mills	4,885	33.1	−6.3
Labor hold		Swing	+6.3	

- The two candidate preferred vote was not counted between the Labor and DLP candidates for Brunswick East.

=== Elections in the 1950s ===
1958 Victorian state election: Brunswick East
Party	Candidate	Votes	%	±%
Labor	Leo Fennessy	9,565	57.9	
Liberal and Country	Bill Burns	3,944	23.9	
Democratic Labor	Allan Swain	3,018	18.3	
Total formal votes		16,527	97.2	
Informal votes		468	2.8	
Turnout		16,995	92.9	
Two-party-preferred result
Labor	Leo Fennessy	10,018	60.6	
Liberal and Country	Bill Burns	6,509	39.4	
Labor hold		Swing		

- Two party preferred vote was estimated.

1955 Victorian state election: Brunswick East
Party	Candidate	Votes	%	±%
Labor	Leo Fennessy	9,277	54.9	
Liberal and Country	Alfred Wall	4,141	24.5	
Labor (A-C)	Joseph O'Carroll	3,492	20.7	
Total formal votes		16,910	97.5	
Informal votes		431	2.5	
Turnout		17,341	93.2	
Two-party-preferred result
Labor	Leo Fennessy	9,801	58.0	
Liberal and Country	Alfred Wall	7,109	42.0	
Labor hold		Swing		
