= Electoral results for the district of Balwyn =

Victoria, Australia, district election results

This is a list of electoral results for the electoral district of Balwyn in Victorian state elections.

== Members for Balwyn ==
Member	Party	Term
Alex Taylor	Liberal	1955–1973
Jim Ramsay	Liberal	1973–1988
Robert Clark	Liberal	1988–1992

== Election results ==
=== Elections in the 1980s ===
1988 Victorian state election: Balwyn
Party	Candidate	Votes	%	±%
Liberal	Robert Clark	16,816	64.28	−1.15
Labor	George Theodoridis	9,344	35.72	+1.15
Total formal votes		26,160	97.41	−0.65
Informal votes		696	2.59	+0.65
Turnout		26,856	90.98	−1.51
Liberal hold		Swing	−1.15	

1985 Victorian state election: Balwyn
Party	Candidate	Votes	%	±%
Liberal	Jim Ramsay	17,994	65.4	+8.2
Labor	Frank Pederick	9,509	34.6	−0.2
Total formal votes		27,503	98.1	
Informal votes		543	1.9	
Turnout		28,046	92.5	
Liberal hold		Swing	+4.9	

1982 Victorian state election: Balwyn
Party	Candidate	Votes	%	±%
Liberal	Jim Ramsay	15,047	58.1	−0.5
Labor	Nora Sparrow	8,857	34.2	+3.6
Democrats	Russel White	1,995	7.7	−3.1
Total formal votes		25,899	98.5	+0.4
Informal votes		385	1.5	−0.4
Turnout		26,284	93.4	+0.7
Two-party-preferred result
Liberal	Jim Ramsay	15,895	61.4	−4.6
Labor	Nora Sparrow	10,004	38.6	+4.6
Liberal hold		Swing	−4.6	

=== Elections in the 1970s ===
1979 Victorian state election: Balwyn
Party	Candidate	Votes	%	±%
Liberal	Jim Ramsay	15,206	58.6	−4.9
Labor	Ann Jackson	7,924	30.6	+2.6
Democrats	Ralph Corrie	2,800	10.8	+10.8
Total formal votes		25,930	98.1	−0.3
Informal votes		505	1.9	+0.3
Turnout		26,435	92.7	+0.5
Two-party-preferred result
Liberal	Jim Ramsay	17,112	66.0	−3.3
Labor	Ann Jackson	8,818	34.0	+3.3
Liberal hold		Swing	−3.3	

1976 Victorian state election: Balwyn
Party	Candidate	Votes	%	±%
Liberal	Jim Ramsay	16,775	63.5	0.0
Labor	Paul Gibson	7,399	28.0	−2.2
Democratic Labor	John Hansen	1,190	4.5	−1.8
Australia	Peter King	1,053	4.0	+4.0
Total formal votes		26,417	98.4	
Informal votes		425	1.6	
Turnout		26,842	92.2	
Two-party-preferred result
Liberal	Jim Ramsay	18,299	69.3	+0.2
Labor	Paul Gibson	8,118	30.7	−0.2
Liberal hold		Swing	+0.2	

1973 Victorian state election: Balwyn
Party	Candidate	Votes	%	±%
Liberal	Jim Ramsay	17,009	62.9	+8.4
Labor	Joan Coxsedge	8,290	30.7	−1.4
Democratic Labor	James Marmion	1,729	6.4	−6.9
Total formal votes		27,028	98.3	+0.3
Informal votes		461	1.7	−0.3
Turnout		27,489	92.2	−1.2
Two-party-preferred result
Liberal	Jim Ramsay	18,478	68.4	+2.5
Labor	Joan Coxsedge	8,550	31.6	−2.5
Liberal hold		Swing	+2.5	

1970 Victorian state election: Balwyn
Party	Candidate	Votes	%	±%
Liberal	Alex Taylor	13,528	54.5	−3.5
Labor	Donald Phelan	7,972	32.1	+2.1
Democratic Labor	John Hansen	3,310	13.3	+1.3
Total formal votes		25,326	98.0	0.0
Informal votes		516	2.0	0.0
Turnout		25,326	93.4	0.0
Two-party-preferred result
Liberal	Alex Taylor	16,342	65.9	−2.3
Labor	Donald Phelan	8,468	34.1	+2.3
Liberal hold		Swing	−2.3	

=== Elections in the 1960s ===
1967 Victorian state election: Balwyn
Party	Candidate	Votes	%	±%
Liberal	Alex Taylor	14,004	58.0	−4.5
Labor	Richard Dunstan	7,248	30.0	+4.3
Democratic Labor	Andrew Gyles	2,910	12.0	+0.2
Total formal votes		24,162	98.0	
Informal votes		489	2.0	
Turnout		24,651	93.4	
Two-party-preferred result
Liberal	Alex Taylor	16,478	68.2	−4.4
Labor	Richard Dunstan	7,684	31.8	+4.4
Liberal hold		Swing	−4.4	

1964 Victorian state election: Balwyn
Party	Candidate	Votes	%	±%
Liberal and Country	Alex Taylor	16,397	62.3	−0.1
Labor	Tony Lamb	6,746	25.6	+1.3
Democratic Labor	James Tighe	3,168	12.0	−1.3
Total formal votes		26,311	98.6	+0.1
Informal votes		375	1.4	−0.1
Turnout		26,686	93.8	−0.3
Two-party-preferred result
Liberal and Country	Alex Taylor	19,090	72.6	−1.1
Labor	Tony Lamb	7,221	27.4	+1.1
Liberal and Country hold		Swing	−1.1	

1961 Victorian state election: Balwyn
Party	Candidate	Votes	%	±%
Liberal and Country	Alex Taylor	15,653	62.4	+1.7
Labor	Edmund Du Vergier	6,104	24.3	+1.8
Democratic Labor	Leo Erwin	3,346	13.3	+2.9
Total formal votes		25,113	98.5	−0.1
Informal votes		380	1.5	+0.1
Turnout		25,493	94.1	+0.1
Two-party-preferred result
Liberal and Country	Alex Taylor	18,506	73.7	−1.3
Labor	Edmund Du Vergier	6,607	26.3	+1.3
Liberal and Country hold		Swing	−1.3	

=== Elections in the 1950s ===
1958 Victorian state election: Balwyn
Party	Candidate	Votes	%	±%
Liberal and Country	Alex Taylor	14,351	60.7	
Labor	John MacPherson	5,321	22.5	
Democratic Labor	Leo Erwin	2,459	10.4	
Independent	Frank Block	1,508	6.4	
Total formal votes		23,639	98.6	
Informal votes		331	1.4	
Turnout		23,970	94.0	
Two-party-preferred result
Liberal and Country	Alex Taylor	17,723	75.0	
Labor	John MacPherson	5,916	25.0	
Liberal and Country hold		Swing		

- Two party preferred vote was estimated.

1955 Victorian state election: Balwyn
Party	Candidate	Votes	%	±%
Liberal and Country	Alex Taylor	14,842	69.9	
Labor	Florence Rodan	6,394	30.1	
Total formal votes		21,236	98.8	
Informal votes		261	1.2	
Turnout		21,497	93.7	
Liberal and Country hold		Swing		
