= Electoral results for the district of Reservoir =

Victoria, Australia, district election results

This is a list of electoral results for the electoral district of Reservoir in Victorian state elections.

== Members for Reservoir ==
Member	Party	Term
William Ruthven	Labor	1955–1961
Dr Harry Jenkins, Snr.	Labor	1961–1969
Jim Simmonds	Labor	1969–1992

== Election results ==
=== Elections in the 1980s ===
1988 Victorian state election: Reservoir
Party	Candidate	Votes	%	±%
Labor	Jim Simmonds	14,352	55.49	−13.17
Liberal	Richard Michelsons	7,163	27.69	−3.65
Independent	Alan Hogan	4,350	16.82	+16.82
Total formal votes		25,865	93.13	−2.65
Informal votes		1,908	6.87	+2.65
Turnout		27,773	92.36	−1.47
Two-party-preferred result
Labor	Jim Simmonds	17,174	66.41	−2.25
Liberal	Richard Michelsons	8,688	33.59	+2.25
Labor hold		Swing	−2.25	

1985 Victorian state election: Reservoir
Party	Candidate	Votes	%	±%
Labor	Jim Simmonds	18,837	68.7	−2.2
Liberal	Rae Kennett	8,597	31.3	+2.4
Total formal votes		27,434	95.8	
Informal votes		1,209	4.2	
Turnout		28,643	93.8	
Labor hold		Swing	−2.4	

1982 Victorian state election: Reservoir
Party	Candidate	Votes	%	±%
Labor	Jim Simmonds	19,387	71.6	+4.2
Liberal	Rodney Blackwood	7,695	28.4	+1.7
Total formal votes		27,082	95.1	−0.5
Informal votes		1,391	4.9	+0.5
Turnout		28,473	94.9	+1.2
Labor hold		Swing	+0.6	

=== Elections in the 1970s ===
1979 Victorian state election: Reservoir
Party	Candidate	Votes	%	±%
Labor	Jim Simmonds	18,129	67.4	+4.6
Liberal	Hugh Luscombe	7,191	26.7	−6.9
Democrats	Arno Vann	1,589	5.9	+5.9
Total formal votes		26,909	95.6	−0.9
Informal votes		1,233	4.4	+0.9
Turnout		28,142	93.7	+0.7
Two-party-preferred result
Labor	Jim Simmonds	19,095	71.0	+6.9
Liberal	Hugh Luscombe	7,814	29.0	−6.9
Labor hold		Swing	+6.9	

1976 Victorian state election: Reservoir
Party	Candidate	Votes	%	±%
Labor	Jim Simmonds	16,639	62.8	+8.6
Liberal	Tony De Domenico	8,904	33.6	+3.4
Independent	Matthew Curie	972	3.7	+3.7
Total formal votes		26,515	96.5	
Informal votes		949	3.5	
Turnout		27,464	93.0	
Two-party-preferred result
Labor	Jim Simmonds	17,007	64.1	+5.5
Liberal	Tony De Domenico	9,508	35.9	−5.5
Labor hold		Swing	+5.5	

1973 Victorian state election: Reservoir
Party	Candidate	Votes	%	±%
Labor	Jim Simmonds	15,856	56.8	+1.5
Liberal	Elizabeth McDonnell	8,388	30.0	+3.8
Democratic Labor	Joseph Fitzgerald	3,690	13.2	−5.2
Total formal votes		27,934	95.8	−0.1
Informal votes		1,231	4.2	+0.1
Turnout		29,165	94.1	−1.8
Two-party-preferred result
Labor	Jim Simmonds	16,410	58.7	+0.7
Liberal	Elizabeth McDonnell	11,524	41.3	−0.7
Labor hold		Swing	+0.7	

1970 Victorian state election: Reservoir
Party	Candidate	Votes	%	±%
Labor	Jim Simmonds	13,595	55.3	+0.2
Liberal	Robert Pritchard	6,442	26.2	−1.6
Democratic Labor	Joseph Fitzgerald	4,560	18.5	+4.0
Total formal votes		24,597	95.9	+0.1
Informal votes		1,053	4.1	−0.1
Turnout		25,650	95.9	0.0
Two-party-preferred result
Labor	Jim Simmonds	14,279	58.0	−1.3
Liberal	Robert Pritchard	10,318	42.0	+1.3
Labor hold		Swing	−1.3	

=== Elections in the 1960s ===
1969 Reservoir state by-election
Party	Candidate	Votes	%	±%
Labor	Jim Simmonds	unopposed		
Labor hold		Swing		

1967 Victorian state election: Reservoir
Party	Candidate	Votes	%	±%
Labor	Harry Jenkins	12,994	55.1	−0.1
Liberal	Peter Allaway	6,561	27.8	+3.6
Democratic Labor	Frederick Whitling	3,427	14.5	−2.6
Communist	William Barnes	444	1.9	−1.6
Independent	James Christie	148	0.6	+0.6
Total formal votes		23,574	95.8	
Informal votes		1,036	4.2	
Turnout		24,610	95.9	
Two-party-preferred result
Labor	Harry Jenkins	13,983	59.3	−0.8
Liberal	Peter Allaway	9,591	40.7	+0.8
Labor hold		Swing	−0.8	

1964 Victorian state election: Reservoir
Party	Candidate	Votes	%	±%
Labor	Harry Jenkins	14,337	53.9	−0.9
Liberal and Country	Peter Coupe	6,645	25.0	+5.9
Democratic Labor	Frederick Whitling	4,618	17.4	−4.6
Communist	William Barnes	987	3.7	−0.4
Total formal votes		26,587	97.0	−0.1
Informal votes		810	3.0	+0.1
Turnout		27,397	95.6	−0.5
Two-party-preferred result
Labor	Harry Jenkins	15,918	59.9	−1.9
Liberal and Country	Peter Coupe	10,669	40.1	+1.9
Labor hold		Swing	−1.9	

1961 Victorian state election: Reservoir
Party	Candidate	Votes	%	±%
Labor	Harry Jenkins	14,110	54.8	−4.9
Democratic Labor	Frederick Whitling	5,656	22.0	+6.3
Liberal and Country	David Welsh	4,909	19.1	−5.6
Communist	John Arrowsmith	1,066	4.1	+4.1
Total formal votes		25,741	97.1	−1.1
Informal votes		763	2.9	+1.1
Turnout		26,504	96.1	+0.9
Two-party-preferred result
Labor	Harry Jenkins	15,918	61.8	−0.2
Liberal and Country	David Welsh	9,823	38.2	+0.2
Labor hold		Swing	−0.2	

- The two candidate preferred vote was not counted between the Labor and DLP candidates for Reservoir.

=== Elections in the 1950s ===
1958 Victorian state election: Reservoir
Party	Candidate	Votes	%	±%
Labor	William Ruthven	14,043	59.7	
Liberal and Country	Hubert Joelson	5,806	24.7	
Democratic Labor	Frederick Whitling	3,690	15.7	
Total formal votes		23,539	98.2	
Informal votes		428	1.8	
Turnout		23,967	95.2	
Two-party-preferred result
Labor	William Ruthven	14,596	62.0	
Liberal and Country	Hubert Joelson	8,943	38.0	
Labor hold		Swing		

- Two party preferred vote was estimated.

1955 Victorian state election: Reservoir
Party	Candidate	Votes	%	±%
Labor	William Ruthven	12,247	55.1	
Liberal and Country	Frederick Capp	6,593	29.6	
Labor (A-C)	Edmund Morrissey	3,405	15.3	
Total formal votes		22,245	98.1	
Informal votes		427	1.9	
Turnout		22,672	96.1	
Two-party-preferred result
Labor	William Ruthven	12,758	57.3	
Liberal and Country	Frederick Capp	9,487	42.7	
Labor hold		Swing		
