= 1989 Greensborough state by-election =

A by-election was held for the Victorian Legislative Assembly seat of Greensborough on 15 April 1989. The by-election was triggered by the resignation on 28 February of Pauline Toner, the sitting Labor member, who died on 3 March.

The election was won by the Labor candidate Sherryl Garbutt, despite a 16-point swing on first preferences. Garbutt was a former schoolteacher, while the Liberal candidate Margaret Brown ran a catering business. Her husband at the time was Neil Brown, a member of the federal shadow cabinet and a former deputy Liberal leader.

== Results ==
Greensborough by-election, 1989
Party	Candidate	Votes	%	±%
Labor	Sherryl Garbutt	11,862	40.12	−15.95
Liberal	Margaret Brown	11,363	38.43	−5.50
Democrats	Peter Allan	4,671	15.80	+15.80
Democratic Labor	John Mulholland	706	2.39	+2.39
Independent	Barbara Gilchrist	479	1.62	+1.62
Independent	Lance Hutchinson	387	1.31	+1.31
Independent	Raelene Jones	100	0.34	+0.34
Total formal votes		29,568	96.94	+0.18
Informal votes		932	3.06	−0.18
Turnout		30,500	90.25	−3.67
Two-party-preferred result
Labor	Sherryl Garbutt	15,229	51.55	−4.52
Liberal	Margaret Brown	14,314	48.45	+4.52
Labor hold		Swing	−4.52	
