= Electoral results for the district of Ovens Valley =

Victoria, Australia, district election results

This is a list of electoral results for the Electoral district of Ovens Valley in Victorian state elections.

== Members for Ovens Valley ==
Member	Party	Term
Tim McCurdy	National	2014–present

== Election results ==
=== Elections in the 2020s ===
2022 Victorian state election: Ovens Valley
Party	Candidate	Votes	%	±%
National	Tim McCurdy	21,057	52.1	+10.4
Labor	Zuvele Leschen	8,369	20.7	+0.0
Greens	Zoe Kromar	3,625	9.0	+4.3
Liberal Democrats	Julian Fidge	2,995	7.4	+7.4
Freedom	Mark Bugge	1,932	4.8	+4.8
Family First	Anna Wise	1,403	3.5	+3.5
Animal Justice	Aisha Slater	1,009	2.5	+2.5
Total formal votes		40,390	95.1	+0.4
Informal votes		2,101	4.9	−0.4
Turnout		42,491	88.3	
Two-party-preferred result
National	Tim McCurdy	27,495	68.0	+5.9
Labor	Zuvele Leschen	12,959	32.0	−5.9
National hold		Swing	+5.9	

=== Elections in the 2010s ===
2018 Victorian state election: Ovens Valley
Party	Candidate	Votes	%	±%
National	Tim McCurdy	16,646	44.46	−10.99
Labor	Kate Doyle	7,703	20.58	−1.58
Independent	Tammy Atkins	7,174	19.16	+19.16
Country	Julian Fidge	3,214	8.59	+8.59
Greens	Vicki Berry	1,687	4.51	−5.54
Independent	Ray Dyer	1,013	2.71	+2.71
Total formal votes		37,437	94.67	−0.84
Informal votes		2,108	5.33	+0.84
Turnout		39,545	91.54	−2.13
Two-party-preferred result
National	Tim McCurdy	23,500	62.63	−3.94
Labor	Kate Doyle	14,025	37.38	+3.94
National hold		Swing	−3.94	

2014 Victorian state election: Ovens Valley
Party	Candidate	Votes	%	±%
National	Tim McCurdy	20,394	55.5	−0.5
Labor	Gail Cholosznecki	8,147	22.2	+2.5
Greens	Jamie McCaffrey	3,694	10.0	+3.7
Country Alliance	Julian Fidge	3,442	9.4	+3.6
Independent	Ray Dyer	1,099	3.0	+3.0
Total formal votes		36,776	95.5	+0.3
Informal votes		1,730	4.5	−0.3
Turnout		38,506	93.7	+4.3
Two-party-preferred result
National	Tim McCurdy	24,502	66.6	−2.7
Labor	Gail Cholosznecki	12,305	33.4	+2.7
National hold		Swing	−2.7	
