= Charlie Ring =

Australian politician

Eugene Cornelius "Charlie" Ring (13 August 1899 – 29 October 1975) was an Australian politician. Born in Chiltern, his parents were Edward Ring (a butcher) and Louisa Grundmann. He worked for his father before becoming a tram driver at Preston. He married Katherine May Smith in 1927; they had one daughter. From 1942 to 1958 he served on the executive of the Tramways Union; he was also a Labor Party member from around 1936.

In 1955 Ring was elected to the Victorian Legislative Assembly for Preston. He served until his retirement in 1970. Ring died at Greensborough in 1975.

Victorian Legislative Assembly
Preceded by William Ruthven	Member for Preston; 1955–1970	Succeeded by Carl Kirkwood
