= Nathan Lambert =

Australian politician

Nathan Lambert MP

Member of the Victorian Legislative Assembly for Preston
- Incumbent
- Assumed office 26 November 2022
- Preceded by: Robin Scott

Personal details
- Party: Labor
- Children: 2
- Education: Oxford University (MBA); University of Melbourne (BCS)
- Occupation: Public servant Political staffer

Nathan Lambert is an Australian politician. He has been a Labor Party member of the Victorian Legislative Assembly since 2022, representing the seat of Preston.

== Early life ==
Before entering politics, Lambert studied computer science and creative arts at the University of Melbourne. He also served as a non-executive director at a Labor-aligned think tank, the Chifley Research Centre, as well as a brief tenure as an associate for McKinsey. From 2019 to 2022, Lambert served as both an assistant and executive director for the Department of Jobs, Precincts and Regions in the Victorian Government. He took leave to run for the Labor party's preselection for the district of Preston.

== Political career ==
Lambert challenged incumbent MP Robin Scott for the Australian Labor Party candidacy for the district of Preston. He was supported by the Shop, Distributive and Allied Employees Association as well as other factions within the Labor party supported by Deputy Prime Minister of Australia Richard Marles.

At the 2022 Victorian state election, Lambert was elected but with a heavy swing against him from the Australian Greens and independent candidate and former Mayor of the City of Darebin Gaetano Greco.

In his inaugural speech to Parliament, Nathan Lambert proposed to his partner Noah, but stated that he was unable to produce a ring due to the Victorian Parliament's restrictions on the use of props. Lambert later confirmed on social media that his partner accepted the proposal.
