= Clive Stoneham =

Australian politician (1909–1992)

The Honourable Clive Stoneham OBE
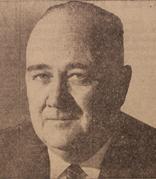

Leader of the Opposition of Victoria Elections: 1961, 1964, 1967
- In office 7 October 1958 – 15 May 1967
- Premier: Henry Bolte
- Deputy: Denis Lovegrove
- Preceded by: Ernie Shepherd
- Succeeded by: Clyde Holding

Leader of the Labor Party in Victoria
- In office 7 October 1958 – 15 May 1967
- Deputy: Denis Lovegrove
- Preceded by: Ernie Shepherd
- Succeeded by: Clyde Holding

Member of the Victorian Legislative Assembly for Midlands
- In office 10 November 1945 – 1 April 1970
- Preceded by: Seat created
- Succeeded by: Les Shilton

Member of the Victorian Legislative Assembly for Maryborough and Daylesford
- In office 28 November 1942 – 1 October 1945
- Preceded by: George Frost
- Succeeded by: Seat abolished

Personal details
- Born: Clive Philip Stoneham; 12 April 1909 Maryborough, Victoria, Australia
- Died: 3 July 1992 (aged 83)
- Party: Labor Party
- Spouse: Maisie Chesterfield (m. 1930)
- Occupation: Railways clerk

Clive Philip Stoneham (12 April 1909 – 3 July 1992) was an Australian politician. He was an ALP member of the Victorian Legislative Assembly for over 27 years from November 1942 to April 1970, representing the electorates of Maryborough and Daylesford (1942–1945) and Midlands (1945–1970). From 1958 to 1967 he was Opposition Leader; he lost the elections of 1961, 1964 and 1967 to the incumbent Liberal Premier Sir Henry Bolte.

== Family ==
Stoneham married Maisie Chesterfield in 1930.

His mother was the pioneer New Zealand unionist Ada Florence Whitehorn, and his father John Stoneham, a piano tuner.

Victorian Legislative Assembly
Preceded by George Frost	Member for Maryborough and Daylesford; 1942–1945	District abolished
District created	Member for Midlands; 1945–1970	Succeeded by Leslie Shilton
Political offices
Preceded by Ernie Shepherd	Leader of the Opposition (Victoria); 1958–1967	Succeeded by Clyde Holding
Party political offices
Preceded by Ernie Shepherd	Leader of the Labor Party in Victoria; 1958–1967	Succeeded by Clyde Holding
