= Ken Jasper =

Australian politician

Ken Jasper AM

Member of the Victorian Parliament for Murrary Valley
- In office 20 March 1976 – 27 November 2010
- Preceded by: Bill Baxter
- Succeeded by: Tim McCurdy

Personal details
- Born: Kenneth Stephen Jasper; 5 June 1938 (age 88) Rutherglen, Victoria, Australia
- Party: National
- Education: Wangaratta Technical College
- Profession: Motor mechanic

Kenneth Stephen Jasper AM (born 5 June 1938) is a former Nationals member for Murray Valley in the Victorian Legislative Assembly. He was first elected in 1976 and announced his retirement from the Legislative Assembly effective from the 2010 Victorian Legislative Assembly election.

== Career ==
He inherited the family automotive business as an apprentice motor mechanic and spray painter, professional used car salesman along with Sonny Petrie, and also major spokesman for crime and youth justice in the township of Rutherglen. He worked alongside local police and certain family members and also Rev of the local church, councillors (Sonny Downs) addressing offending behaviour by local youth being very persuasive to protect the community from Shanghai shooting individuals in Crime Prevention Strategy.

Jasper entered Parliament in 1976, succeeding Bill Baxter who, because of a redistribution, stood for the neighbouring seat of Benambra. Jasper went on to win the subsequent 10 elections. In the November 2006 Victorian Legislative Assembly election he won all 29 booths in the electorate of Murray Valley.

On 24 August 2009, he announced his intention to retire at the 2010 Victorian Legislative Assembly election after his wife was diagnosed with severe dementia.

Jasper publicly broke from his party when he endorsed independent candidate Cathy McGowan for the seat of Indi over the candidate of the Liberal party, Sophie Mirabella.

== Issues ==
- Gauge conversion of Oaklands branch railway

== Honours ==
On 11 June 2012, Jasper was named a Member of the Order of Australia for "service to the Parliament of Victoria, and to the community of the Murray Valley, through advocacy and support roles for the performing arts, multicultural, transport, health and emergency service organisations".

== Personal life ==
Jasper married Annette Joy Griffiths on 2 January 1971; together they have two children.

Victorian Legislative Assembly
| Preceded by Bill Baxter | Member for Murray Valley; 1976–2010 | Succeeded by Tim McCurdy |
