= Ron McAlister =

Australian politician

Ronald Graham Henry McAlister (20 September 1922 – 21 April 1996) was an Australian politician.

He was born in Carlton to labourer Graham Maxwell McAlister and Louise Violet Robinson. He worked as a mechanical engineer, and served in the Royal Australian Navy from 1939 to 1945. He was the principal consultant of an engineering firm, as well as a Labor Party member who served on the state administrative committee from 1971 to 1974. He was a Brunswick City councillor from 1965 to 1968. In 1975 he was elected to the Victorian Legislative Assembly in a by-election for Brunswick East; however, the seat was abolished prior to the 1976 state election, and McAlister contested preselection for Glenroy unsuccessfully. From 1976 ill health saw him in semi-retirement. He died in 1996.

Victorian Legislative Assembly
| Preceded by David Bornstein | Member for Brunswick East; 1975–1976 | Abolished |
