= Michael Leighton (politician) =

Australian politician (1954–2014)

Member of the Victorian Legislative Assembly for Preston
- In office 1 October 1988 – 24 November 2006
- Preceded by: Carl Kirkwood
- Succeeded by: Robin Scott

Personal details
- Born: Michael Andrew Leighton; 20 October 1954 Melbourne, Victoria, Australia
- Died: 8 November 2014 (aged 60) Melbourne, Victoria, Australia
- Party: Labor Party
- Education: Monash University
- Occupation: Psychiatric nurse, trade union official

Michael Andrew Leighton (20 October 1954 – 8 November 2014) was an Australian politician.

Born in Melbourne, Victoria, he attended Monash University 1972–76 and subsequently began practising as a psychiatric nurse. Having joined the Labor Party in 1976, he became a trade union official in 1981, and in 1980 became a City of Heidelberg councillor, serving until 1982. In 1988, he was elected to the Victorian Legislative Assembly as the Labor member for Preston. He held various positions in the shadow ministry from 1992–96, but was not included on the front bench when Labor won office in 1999. Leighton retired in 2006. He died, aged 60, on 8 November 2014.

Victorian Legislative Assembly
Preceded by Carl Kirkwood	Member for Preston; 1988–2006	Succeeded by Robin Scott
