= Pauline Toner =

Australian politician

The Honourable Pauline Toner

Minister for Community Welfare Services
- In office 8 April 1982 – 14 March 1985
- Premier: John Cain II
- Preceded by: Walter Jona
- Succeeded by: Caroline Hogg

Member of the Victorian Legislative Assembly for Greensborough
- In office 5 November 1977 – 28 February 1989
- Preceded by: Monte Vale
- Succeeded by: Sherryl Garbutt

Personal details
- Born: Pauline Therese Hoare; 16 March 1935 Horsham, Victoria, Australia
- Died: 3 March 1989 (aged 53) Melbourne, Victoria, Australia
- Party: Labor Party
- Spouse: Brian Toner (m. 1962)
- Education: University of Melbourne; La Trobe University
- Occupation: Schoolteacher

Pauline Therese Toner (16 March 1935 – 3 March 1989) was the first female cabinet minister in the Parliament of Victoria. A member of the Labor Party, she was elected to the Victorian Legislative Assembly in 1977 and was Minister for Community Welfare Services from 1982 to 1985. She resigned from Parliament in 1989 and died on 3 March 1989.

== Biography ==
Toner was born in Horsham, Victoria, the third child of William and Madge Hoare. After attending the Brigidine Convent in Horsham, she trained as a primary school teacher, then attended university, obtaining a Bachelor of Arts (University of Melbourne) and a Bachelor of Education (La Trobe University). In 1962, she married architect Brian Toner (d. 2008) and they had five children. Illness forced her resignation from parliament on 28 February 1989, and she died of cancer three days later on 3 March.

== Career ==
Following her early teaching career, Toner became a lecturer at the State College of Victoria. She joined the Labor Party (ALP) in 1968 and was elected to the Diamond Valley Shire Council in 1973, becoming shire president in 1977.

She was elected to the Victorian Legislative Assembly in a by-election in 1977, winning the seat of Greensborough for the ALP, and became the opposition spokeswoman on community services and women's affairs. When the ALP formed government in 1982, Toner became the Minister for Community Welfare Services, and the first woman to hold a ministerial position in the Victorian Parliament. She held that office until 1985, and continued to serve as a backbencher until her resignation in 1989.

Toner's work focussed on the rights of children, and her legacy includes the introduction of laws that made it easier for adoptees to obtain information about their adoption. She also implemented funding for Neighbourhood Houses.

In 1986 the Eltham Copper Butterfly (Paralucia pyrodiscus lucida), thought to be extinct, was rediscovered in the Greensborough electorate. Toner campaigned successfully to acquire land for the protection of this threatened species.

She was posthumously inducted onto the Victorian Honour Roll of Women in 2001.

Victorian Legislative Assembly
| Preceded by Monte Vale | Member for Greensborough; 1977–1989 | Succeeded by Sherryl Garbutt |
Political offices
| Preceded by Walter Jona | Minister for Community Welfare Services; 1982–1985 | Succeeded by Caroline Hogg as Minister for Community Services |
