= William Ruthven (Australian soldier) =

Australian politician

William Ruthven VC
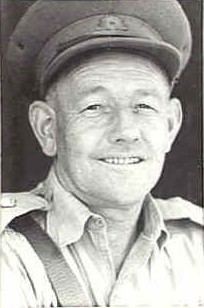
- Major Ruthven during the Second World War

Member of the Victorian Legislative Assembly for Reservoir
- In office 28 May 1955 – 14 July 1961
- Preceded by: New district
- Succeeded by: Harry Jenkins Sr.

Member of the Victorian Legislative Assembly for Preston
- In office 10 November 1945 – 27 May 1955
- Preceded by: New district
- Succeeded by: Charlie Ring

Mayor of Collingwood
- In office 1945–1946
- Preceded by: Bill Towers
- Succeeded by: R.L. Friend

Personal details
- Born: 21 May 1893 Collingwood, Victoria
- Died: 12 January 1970 (aged 76) Heidelberg, Victoria
- Party: Labor Party
- Nickname: Rusty

Military service
- Allegiance: Australia
- Branch/service: Australian Army
- Years of service: 1915–1918; 1941–1944
- Rank: Major
- Unit: 22nd Battalion
- Battles/wars: First World War; Gallipoli Campaign; Western Front; Battle of Fromelles; Second World War
- Awards: Victoria Cross

William "Rusty" Ruthven, VC (21 May 1893 – 12 January 1970) was an Australian soldier and state Labor politician. For actions in the First World War he was an Australian recipient of the Victoria Cross, the highest award for gallantry in the face of the enemy that can be awarded to British and Commonwealth forces.

== Early life ==
Born in Collingwood, Victoria, William Ruthven was educated locally at the Vere Street State School. He became a mechanical engineer and was employed in the timber industry prior to his enlistment in the Australian Imperial Force in April 1915 for service in the First World War. He stood only 168 centimetres (5 ft 6 in) tall, just above the minimum height requirement.

== First World War ==
Ruthven in WWI

Ruthven was 24 years old, and a sergeant in the 22nd Battalion, 2nd Division, when at Ville-sur-Ancre on 19 May 1918 the following deed took place for which he was awarded the Victoria Cross. The full citation for his actions appeared in a supplement to the London Gazette on 11 July 1918:

War Office, 11th July, 1918.

His Majesty the KING has been graciously pleased to approve of the award of the Victoria Cross to the undermentioned Officers and Non-Commissioned Officer: —

[...]

No. 1946 Sjt. William Ruthven, A.I.F.

For most conspicuous bravery and initiative in action. During the advance Sjt. Ruthven's company suffered numerous casualties, and his company commander was severely wounded. He thereupon assumed command of this portion of the assault, took charge of the company headquarters, and rallied the section in his vicinity.

As the leading wave approached its objective it was subjected to heavy fire from an enemy machine-gun at close range. Without hesitation he at once sprang out, threw a [Mills] bomb which landed beside the post, and rushed the position, bayoneting one of the crew and capturing the gun. He then encountered some of the enemy coming out of a shelter. He wounded two, captured six others in the same position, and handed them over to an escort from the leading wave, which had now reached the objective.

Sjt. Ruthven then reorganised the men in his vicinity and established a post in the second objective.

Observing enemy movement in a sunken road near by, he, without hesitation and armed only with a revolver, went over the open alone and rushed the position, shooting two enemy who refused to come out of their dug-outs.

He then single-handed mopped up this post and captured the whole of the garrison, amounting in all to thirty-two, and kept them until assistance arrived to escort them back to our lines.

During the remainder of the day this gallant non-commissioned officer set a splendid example of leadership, moving up and down his position under fire, supervising consolidation and encouraging his men.

Throughout the whole operation he showed the most magnificent courage and determination, inspiring everyone by his fine fighting spirit, his remarkable courage, and his dashing action.

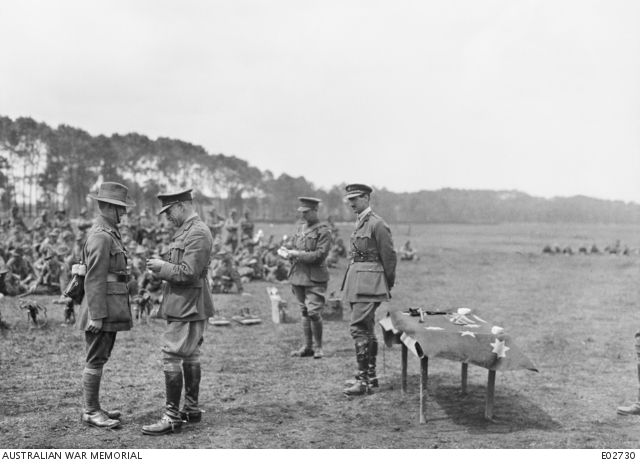
Second Lieutenant W. Ruthven, receiving the VC at a presentation ceremony held by Lieutenant General Sir John Monash, near Camon, France, July 1918.

He was wounded in June 1918 and in July was commissioned as a second lieutenant. Later in the war he returned to Australia and was promoted to lieutenant and campaigned with other VC winners on a recruiting drive. He was demobilised in December 1918. In early 1919, his VC was stolen from his home, along with several other items. Police arrested the culprits and the medal was returned with a note apologising for the theft.

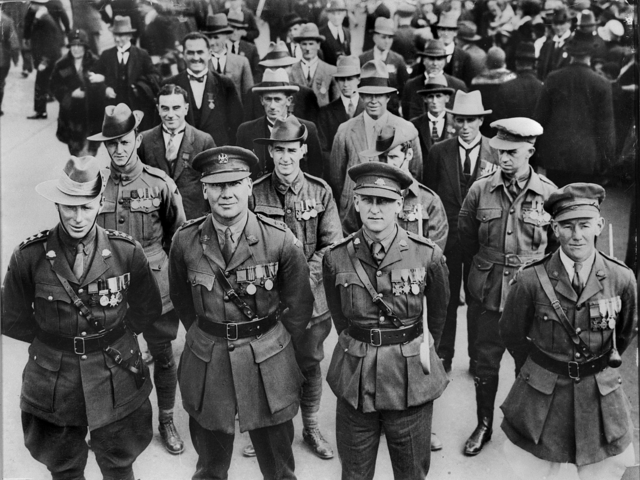
Ruthven (front, right) with other VC recipients in Melbourne Anzac Day 1927.

== Later years ==
Ruthven was the timekeeper for the Collingwood Football Club from 1939 until his death. His nephew Allan Ruthven played for Fitzroy.

During the Second World War, Ruthven served in Australia with several garrison units, including the 3rd Australian Garrison Battalion, and was based at Murchison, which was the largest prisoner of war camp in Victoria. He achieved the rank of major.

He was elected a councillor in the Melbourne municipality of Collingwood, and in 1945 was elected as mayor. He sat in the Victorian Legislative Assembly from 1945 until 1955 as the Labor Party member for the electoral district of Preston, then following a redistribution, represented the electoral district of Reservoir until his retirement in 1961.

His Victoria Cross is displayed at the Australian War Memorial in Canberra. The Ruthven Soldiers' Club in Broadmeadows was opened in his honour in 1959, and in 1963 the Ruthven railway station near Reservoir was named after him.

Victorian Legislative Assembly
New division	Member for Preston; 1945–1955	Succeeded by Charlie Ring
New division	Member for Reservoir; 1955–1961	Succeeded by Harry Jenkins Sr.
