= Tim McCurdy =

Australian politician

Tim McCurdy MP
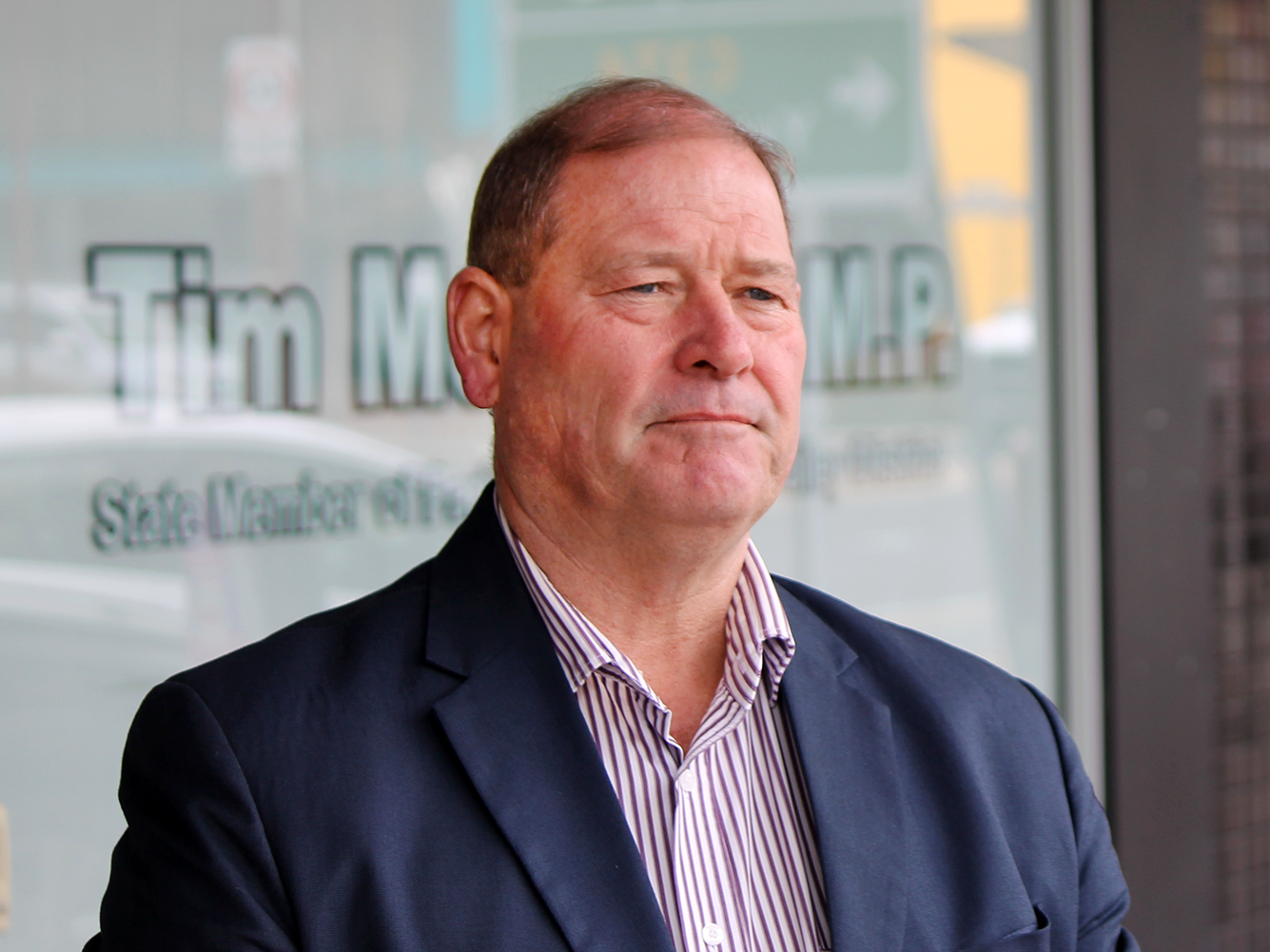
- McCurdy standing outside his Wangaratta office

Member of the Victorian Legislative Assembly for Ovens Valley
- Incumbent
- Assumed office 29 November 2014
- Preceded by: New seat

Member of the Victorian Legislative Assembly for Murray Valley
- In office 27 November 2010 – 29 November 2014
- Preceded by: Ken Jasper
- Succeeded by: Seat abolished

Personal details
- Born: 16 January 1963 (age 63) Dandenong, Victoria
- Party: National Party
- Children: 4
- Website: timmcurdy.com.au

Timothy Logan McCurdy (born 16 January 1963) is an Australian politician. He has been a member of the Victorian Legislative Assembly since 2010, representing Murray Valley until 2014 and Ovens Valley thereafter. He was the shadow minister for sport, veterans, gaming and liquor control until March 2018, stepping down in light of the decision of Victoria Police to formally charge McCurdy with fraud offences. The charges were dismissed in the Victorian County Court in April 2021 due to lack of evidence. McCurdy returned to the Shadow Cabinet after the 2022 Victorian Election as the Shadow Minister for Water, and Consumer Affairs, and Gaming and Liquor (in 2025).

== Legal controversies ==
In September 2014, PGW Agriservices issued a writ against McCurdy in the County Court of Victoria claiming damages in the sum of $375,741 for misleading and deceptive conduct and unconscionable conduct contrary to the Fair Trading Act. The claims pertain to McCurdy's pre-politics career as a real estate agent and commissions worth $375,741 he received in respect of the sale of two farms, the sale of 'Malmo' located 50 km north of Shepparton for $7.8 million in July 2009 and 'Pinegrove' in Katamatite for $3.9 million in December 2009. Both properties were sold to a Chinese purchaser, Xing Long International. The statement of claim alleged that McCurdy had forged the letterhead of his former colleague and employer, Andrew Gilmour, to profit from the sales after McCurdy had ceased his employment with PGG Wrightson and having told Gilmour that the sales had "fallen over" and "were not proceeding due to the lack of finance". McCurdy settled the civil claim against him later that year.

In October 2014, it was revealed that McCurdy had been accused by a long-serving former Nationals staffer, Jillian McGillivray, of harassment and bullying, with lawyers for McGillivray expecting her case to be listed before the Wangaratta Magistrates Court in November 2014. McCurdy denied any wrongdoing. After the legal entity responsible for employing parliamentary staff, the Department of Parliamentary Services, paid a confidential settlement sum to McGillivray to settle the court proceedings, McCurdy was subsequently threatened with defamation proceedings for falsely telling public meetings that McGillivray's case had been "thrown out of court" and allegedly calling McGillivray a "bitch".

McCurdy was criticised by Liberal MP Tim Smith in 2019 for employing his wife and one of his daughters in his electorate office at taxpayer expense, which Smith described as "totally unacceptable". However, unlike their federal counterparts, state MPs are not prohibited from employing family members in taxpayer-funded roles.

== Criminal trial ==
In July 2017, it was reported that McCurdy was being investigated by police for alleged fraud after complaints that, when working as a real estate agent in 2009, he had falsified documents to secure sales commissions worth about $375,000. Victoria Police searched McCurdy's office and residence as part of their investigation. In March 2018, police charged McCurdy with multiple fraud offences, and he stood down from his shadow ministry portfolios. In October 2018 it was announced that he would stand trial on ten fraud charges. In March 2019, the Crown successfully convinced the County Court to move the fraud trial from the Shepparton County Court (located near McCurdy's electorate) to the Melbourne County Court. McCurdy successfully delayed the trial until May 2020 due to the unavailability of his barrister, Ian Hill QC.

On 21 April 2021, judge George Georgiou dismissed the charges against McCurdy in the County Court, ruling that there was insufficient evidence to obtain a conviction after the main witness of the prosecution admitted that he falsified the document not Mr McCurdy.

Victorian Legislative Assembly
Preceded by Ken Jasper	Member for Murray Valley; 2010–2014	Abolished
New title	Member for Ovens Valley; 2014–present	Incumbent
