= Alex Taylor (Australian politician) =

Australian politician

Alexander William Taylor ED (23 October 1906 – 15 June 1976) was an Australian politician.

Taylor was born in Richmond to cutter Albert Alexander Taylor and Annie Barbara Turner. He attended Melbourne Technical College, and worked as a jackeroo and a ham and bacon curer. On 23 May 1936 he married Enid Mary Robinson, with whom he had five children. He served in World War II and attained the rank of major also Temporary Lieutenant Colonel - Brigade Commander Artillery]. He was awarded the Efficiency Decoration, and in 1944 commenced work with Commonwealth Food Control. From 1946 he was export and sales manager for Boston Canning Company, becoming a director in 1949 before beginning his own import/export business in 1950.

From 1953 to 1955 Taylor was on the state executive of the Liberal and Country Party, and in 1955 he was elected to the Victorian Legislative Assembly as the member for Balwyn. He did not attain a ministerial position, and was known as a prominent critic of party leader and premier Sir Henry Bolte. Taylor lost preselection for his seat in 1973 and retired from politics, becoming a farmer at Metung. He died in 1976 at Malvern.

Victorian Legislative Assembly
New seat	Member for Balwyn; 1955–1973	Succeeded by Jim Ramsay
