= George Moss (politician) =

Australian politician

The Honourable George Moss
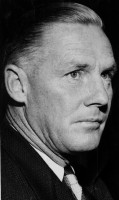

Member of the Victorian Legislative Assembly for Murray Valley
- In office 10 November 1945 – 17 April 1973
- Preceded by: Seat created
- Succeeded by: Bill Baxter

Personal details
- Born: George Colin Moss; 20 August 1913 Numurkah, Victoria
- Died: 27 May 1985 (aged 71) Numurkah
- Party: Country Party
- Spouse: Katrine Nancy Fankhauser (m. 1942)
- Occupation: Farmer

George Colin Moss (20 August 1913 – 27 May 1985) was an Australian politician.

He was born in Numurkah to farmer Frederick George Moss and schoolteacher Mary Jane McArthur. He attended local state schools and worked on the family farm until 1938, when he established a wheat farm of his own at Katunga. From 1940 he had a sheep and cattle farm, but during World War II he served in the military. On 13 June 1942 he married Katrine Nancy Fankhauser, with whom he had four daughters. He was elected to the Victorian Legislative Assembly in 1945 as the Country Party member for Murray Valley. From 1950 to 1952 he was Minister of Agriculture and Mines. In 1955 he became deputy leader of the party, succeeding to the leadership in 1964. He relinquished the leadership to Peter Ross-Edwards in 1970 and retired in 1973. Moss died at Numurkah in 1985.

Victorian Legislative Assembly
New seat	Member for Murray Valley; 1945–1973	Succeeded by Bill Baxter
Party political offices
Preceded by Sir Herbert Hyland	Leader of the Country Party in Victoria; 1964–1970	Succeeded by Peter Ross-Edwards
