= Monte Vale =

Australian politician

Roy Mountford "Monte" Vale (12 September 1912 – 10 September 1977) was an Australian politician.

Vale was born in Foster to schoolteacher William Mountford Vale and Flora Ethel Reddick. He attended state schools before studying at Melbourne Teachers' College and becoming a teacher from 1934. In 1949 he became seriously ill and lost a leg to amputation. He then worked as a laboratory assistant for Australian Paper Manufacturers.

Vale was a member of a political family; his great grandfather William Vale and his great grand-uncle Richard Vale were both members of the Victorian Legislative Assembly. A Liberal Party member, Vale was a member of Diamond Valley Shire Council from 1964 to 1969, and from 1970 to 1973, serving as president from 1971 to 1972. He was elected to the Victorian Legislative Assembly in 1967 as the member for Greensborough. Defeated at the 1970 state election, he was re-elected in 1973, but that election was declared void by the Court of Disputed Returns. Vale won the subsequent by-election.

Vale died at Heidelberg in 1977. His son Roger Vale was a member of the Northern Territory Legislative Assembly.

Victorian Legislative Assembly
New seat	Member for Greensborough; 1967–1970	Succeeded by Bob Fell
Preceded by Bob Fell	Member for Greensborough; 1973; 1973–1977	Succeeded by Pauline Toner
