= Jim Ramsay =

Australian politician

The Honourable Jim Ramsay

Member of the Victorian Legislative Assembly for Balwyn
- In office 19 May 1973 – 30 September 1988
- Preceded by: Alex Taylor
- Succeeded by: Robert Clark

Personal details
- Born: James Halford Ramsay; 12 February 1930 Camberwell, Victoria, Australia
- Died: 22 August 2013 (aged 83)
- Party: Liberal Party
- Spouse: Dorothy Gaze (m. 1953)
- Education: University of Melbourne
- Occupation: Printer and publisher

James Halford Ramsay (12 February 1930 – 22 August 2013) was an Australian politician. He was a Liberal Party member of the Victorian Legislative Assembly, representing the seat of Balwyn. He was also a minister in the cabinets of Dick Hamer and Lindsay Thompson.

== Personal life ==
James Halford Ramsay was born in Camberwell, Melbourne, on 12 February 1930, the third of four children of Australian-born parents, Alan William Ramsay, printer and publisher, and Beatrice Agnes Ramsay (née Kent), physiotherapist. He was raised with his siblings Tom, Mary and Bill in the family home in Chaucer Crescent, Canterbury, and educated at East Camberwell Primary School before secondary education at Scotch College, Hawthorn.

After working with his father Alan at publisher Ramsay Ware, Jim was elected to the Victorian parliament as the MLA for Balwyn in 1973 where he served for 15 years.

Victorian Legislative Assembly
Preceded by Alex Taylor	Member for Balwyn; 1973–1988	Succeeded by Robert Clark
Political offices
Preceded by Rob Maclellan	Minister of Labour and Industry; 1978–1982	Succeeded by Rob Jolly
Preceded by Rob Maclellan	Minister of Consumer Affairs; 1978–1981	Succeeded by Haddon Storey
Preceded by Ian Smith	Minister for Economic Development; 1981–1982	Succeeded by Bill Landeryou
