= Les Shilton =

Australian politician

Leslie Victor "Les" Shilton (4 November 1923 – 16 December 1995) was an Australian politician.

He was born in Traralgon to schoolteacher Harold Robert Charles Shilton and Alice May Sturgess. He served in New Guinea during World War II from 1941 to 1945, and on his return became a police officer, spending many years with the Criminal Investigation Branch. On 8 December 1945 he married Faye Sarll; they had two daughters. In 1965 he was elected to Seymour Shire Council; he was president from 1967 to 1968. In 1970 he was elected to the Victorian Legislative Assembly as the Labor member for Midlands, but he was defeated in 1973. After his defeat he became a bank officer. Shilton died in 1995.

Victorian Legislative Assembly
Preceded by Clive Stoneham	Member for Midlands; 1970–1973	Succeeded by Bill Ebery
