= Electoral district of Balwyn =

Former state electoral district of Victoria, Australia

Balwyn Victoria—Legislative Assembly
- State: Victoria
- Created: 1955
- Abolished: 1992
- Namesake: Balwyn
- Demographic: Metropolitan
- Coordinates: 37°49′S 145°5′E

Electoral district of Balwyn was an electoral district of the Legislative Assembly in the Australian state of Victoria. It centered on the eastern Melbourne suburb of Balwyn.

== Members for Balwyn ==
Member	Party	Term
Alex Taylor	Liberal	1955–1973
Jim Ramsay	Liberal	1973–1988
Robert Clark	Liberal	1988–1992
