= Bill Ebery =

Australian politician

William Thomas Ebery (31 August 1925 – 10 May 2017) was an Australian politician.

He was born at Castlemaine, the son of grazier Francis Hamilton Ebery. He was a farmer and grazier in the Castlemaine area. On 17 February 1951 he married Anne Lorraine Evans; they had two children. In 1962 he joined the Liberal Party, becoming president of his local Newstead branch in 1973. In that year he was elected to the Victorian Legislative Assembly as the member for Midlands. With the abolition of his seat ahead of the 1985 state election, he unsuccessfully sought preselection for Bendigo East before ultimately contesting the Legislative Council seat of North Western, losing to the sitting National Party member.

Victorian Legislative Assembly
| Preceded by Les Shilton | Member for Midlands; 1973–1985 | Abolished |
