= Electoral district of Brunswick East =

Brunswick East Victoria—Legislative Assembly
- State: Victoria
- Created: 1955
- Abolished: 1976
- Namesake: Brunswick East
- Demographic: Metropolitan
- Coordinates: 37°46′S 144°58′E

Electoral district of Brunswick East was an electoral district of the Legislative Assembly in the Australian state of Victoria.

== Members for Brunswick East ==
Member	Party	Term
Leo Fennessy	Labor	1955–1970
David Bornstein	Labor	1970–1975
Ron McAlister	Labor	1975–1976
