= Bill Baxter (Victorian politician) =

Australian politician (born 1946)

The Honourable Bill Baxter AM

Member of the Victorian Parliament for North Eastern Province
- In office February 1985 – 2006

Member of the Legislative Council of Victoria
- In office 1978 – November 1984
- Constituency: North Eastern Province

Member of the Legislative Assembly of Victoria
- In office 1973–1976
- Preceded by: George Moss
- Succeeded by: Ken Jasper
- Constituency: Murray Valley

Personal details
- Born: 3 November 1946 (age 79) Nathalia, Victoria
- Party: National Party
- Occupation: Farmer and grazier

William Robert Baxter AM (born 3 November 1946) is a former Australian politician and a former Victorian State President of The Nationals. He was the Nationals member of the Victorian Legislative Council representing North Eastern Province from June 1978 until November 2006 (excepting a four-month break in 1984–85). He also served one term in the Victorian Legislative Assembly from 1973 to 1976.

== Early life ==
Baxter was born and raised in the Nathalia area. He started high school in Nathalia, but completed his secondary schooling at the prestigious Scotch College, Melbourne, where he was a boarder in School House. He then returned to his family property at Picola, near Nathalia, and began working as a farmer and grazier. Around the same time, he began to pursue an interest in politics.

== Political career ==
In 1966, at the age of only twenty, he became the secretary of his local Country Party branch, and a delegate to the party conference. At the 1969 federal election, he was campaign director in Deputy Prime Minister Sir John McEwen's seat of Murray.

Baxter was elected to the Nathalia Shire Council in 1970, and in 1973 became the Shire President. In the same year, he stood as the National Party candidate for the relatively safe Legislative Assembly seat of Murray Valley, replacing the retiring member George Moss. Having been easily elected, he juggled the two commitments until 1975, when he ceased to be Shire President, although he remained on the council. Throughout this term, Baxter also served on the parliamentary Road Safety Committee. In the lead-up to the 1976 state election, the Murray Valley electorate underwent major boundary changes, and as a result, Baxter chose to contest the adjacent seat of Benambra. Baxter polled the most primary votes, but although it had been a National Party seat since 1932, Benambra fell to Lou Lieberman of the rival conservative Liberal Party on preferences.

After losing his seat in the Legislative Assembly, Baxter made a comeback in 1978, when he switched to the Legislative Council and successfully contested a by-election in the safe National Party seat of North Eastern Province. He received his first parliamentary position the following year, when he was appointed as Deputy Leader of the National Party in the Legislative Council and Party Whip. He was again returned in a regular election the following year. After the election, he nominated for a position on the Public Works Committee, and served there until 1982, when he switched to the Natural Resources and Environment Committee.

In 1984, Baxter resigned from the Legislative Council to contest the federal seat of Indi, challenging sitting Liberal member Ewen Cameron. The bid was unsuccessful, as Baxter came third behind Cameron and the ALP candidate, and Cameron was easily re-elected on Baxter's preferences. Baxter subsequently contested the by-election for his old seat in February 1985, and was once again elected to the Legislative Council. Over the next three years, he served on three more committees, responsible for Economic and Budget Review, WorkCare and Social Development.

Baxter retained his previous portfolios after being re-elected in 1985, and received another promotion in 1988, when he became Leader of the National Party in the Legislative Council. In 1990, he was made Shadow Minister for Roads and Ports as part of the Liberal-National coalition opposition. Two years later, Jeff Kennett led the coalition to an election victory, and Baxter became Minister for Roads and Ports in the new government. However, the 1996 election saw a changed ratio between the two parties, and the National Party lost one of its portfolios to the Liberals. As a result, Baxter returned to the backbenches, and instead took up a position as Chairman of the Parliament House Completion Authority, which oversaw the renovation of Parliament House in order to comply with the original architectural designs.

The coalition between the Liberal and National parties again fractured after the Kennett government suffered a surprise defeat at the 1999 election. This meant that a range of new portfolios had to be filled, in order to cover all the areas that had previously been overseen by members of the larger Liberal Party. When these were allocated after the 2002 election, Baxter once again was in line for promotion, obtaining the high-profile portfolios of the treasury, finance, industry, industrial relations and the financial services industry. In addition, he was also a member of the Legislative Council Privileges and Public Accounts and Estimates Committees.

Baxter was an active member of the Commonwealth Parliamentary Association for many years, having served on its executive committee and attended numerous conferences, going back as far as 1980. In September 2002, he made a bid for the position of executive committee chairman, but was defeated by Canada's Bob Speller.

As a result of reforms to the Legislative Council made after the 2002 election, Baxter's two-member electorate was abolished and replaced with a larger, five-member electorate. After fellow incumbent Damian Drum won the first spot on the National Party ticket, Baxter decided to transfer back to the Legislative Assembly, and he hoped to regain the seat of Benambra for the Nationals at the upcoming 2006 election. He polled third behind Bill Tilley of the Liberal Party and Labor candidate Lisa Mahood.

In early 2007 Baxter became the Victorian State President of The Nationals after the resignation of John Tanner, who became Federal President. After retiring from the presidency in 2009, Baxter was awarded life membership of the Victorian National Party.

In 2018, Baxter was inducted as a Member of the Order of Australia for services to the Victorian Parliament.
