= Bob Fell =

Australian politician (1930–2009)

Robert William Fell OAM (5 April 1930 – 28 September 2009) was an Australian politician.

== Biography ==
Robert William Fell was born in Melbourne to fitter and turner Arthur Erwin Fell and Stella May. He was a construction manager before entering politics, and served in the Citizen Military Forces from 1948 to 1950. On 23 February 1952 he married Dorothy Helen Finlay, with whom he had four children. He was a member of Diamond Valley Shire Council from 1964, serving as president from 1968 to 1969 and from 1976 to 1977.

In 1970 was Fell elected to the Victorian Legislative Assembly as the Labor member for Greensborough, but he was defeated in 1973 by only five votes. Fell appealed to the Court of Disputed Returns and succeeded in overturning the election result, but lost the resulting by-election by a larger margin. Fell was awarded the Medal of the Order of Australia in 1984. He died on 28 September 2009, at the age of 79.

Victorian Legislative Assembly
Preceded by Monte Vale	Member for Greensborough; 1970–1973	Succeeded by Monte Vale
