= Electoral district of Midlands =

Former state electoral district of Victoria, Australia

Midlands Victoria—Legislative Assembly
- State: Victoria
- Created: 1945
- Abolished: 1985
- Demographic: Rural
- Coordinates: 37°10′S 144°35′E

The Electoral district of Midlands was an electoral district of the Victorian Legislative Assembly.

It was created in the 1945 redistribution and mainly consisted of the abolished Bulla and Dalhousie and Castlemaine and Kyneton districts.

== Members for Midlands ==
Member	Party	Term
Clive Stoneham	Labor	1945–1970
Les Shilton	Labor	1970–1973
Bill Ebery	Liberal	1973–1985

== See also ==
- Parliaments of the Australian states and territories
- List of members of the Victorian Legislative Assembly
