= Electoral district of Preston =

State electoral district of Victoria, Australia

Preston Victoria—Legislative Assembly
- Interactive map of electoral district boundaries from the 2022 state election
- State: Victoria
- Created: 1945
- MP: Nathan Lambert
- Party: Labor Party
- Namesake: Suburb of Preston
- Electors: 45,253 (2018)
- Area: 27 km^{2} (10.4 sq mi)
- Demographic: Metropolitan

The electoral district of Preston is an electoral district of the Victorian Legislative Assembly. It currently centres on the northern Melbourne suburbs of Preston and Reservoir. It has always been a safe Labor Party seat.

The most prominent former member was Victoria Cross recipient William Ruthven. At the 2006 election Robin Scott was elected to succeed the retiring Michael Leighton who had been the member since the 1988 election. In 2022, Scott was succeeded by Nathan Lambert.

== Members for Preston ==
Image	Member	Party	Term	Notes
	William Ruthven (1893–1970)	Labor	10 November 1945 – 28 May 1955	
	Charlie Ring (1899–1975)	Labor	28 May 1955 – 30 May 1970	
	Carl Kirkwood (1929–2020)	Labor	30 May 1970 – 1 October 1988	
	Michael Leighton (1954–2014)	Labor	1 October 1988 – 25 November 2006	
	Robin Scott (1973–)	Labor	25 November 2006 – 26 November 2022	
	Nathan Lambert	Labor	26 November 2022 – present	Incumbent

== Election results ==
2022 Victorian state election: Preston
Party	Candidate	Votes	%	±%
Labor	Nathan Lambert	14,999	37.6	−14.7
Liberal	Amanda Paliouras	6,883	17.3	+0.6
Greens	Patchouli Paterson	6,027	15.1	+0.5
Independent	Gaetano Greco	5,473	13.7	+7.2
Victorian Socialists	Steph Price	2,458	6.2	+2.4
Freedom	Angelique Matias	1,150	2.9	+2.9
Reason	Carmen Lahiff-Jenkins	890	2.2	−0.7
Family First	Raouf Soliman	885	2.2	+2.2
Animal Justice	Rachel Unicomb	822	2.1	−0.8
Independent	Brian Sanaghan	270	0.7	+0.7
Total formal votes		39,857	92.2	−0.5
Informal votes		3,392	7.8	+0.5
Turnout		43,249	85.9	+0.3
Notional two-party-preferred count
Labor	Nathan Lambert	27,769	69.7	–8.6
Liberal	Amanda Paliouras	12,088	30.3	+8.6
Two-candidate-preferred result
Labor	Nathan Lambert	20,761	52.1	−19.2
Greens	Patchouli Paterson	19,096	47.9	+19.2
Labor hold		Swing	–19.2	
