= Electoral district of Murray Valley =

Former state electoral district of Victoria, Australia

Murray Valley Victoria—Legislative Assembly
- State: Victoria
- Created: 1945
- Abolished: 2014
- Electors: 38,342 (2010)
- Area: 5,020 km^{2} (1,938.2 sq mi)
- Demographic: Rural

The Electoral district of Murray Valley was an electoral district of the Victorian Legislative Assembly.

It contained the towns of Cobram, Numurkah, Rutherglen, Wangaratta and Yarrawonga, as well as many other smaller towns.

The electorate was created in 1945 and abolished in 2014. For the entirety of existence it was held by the National Party and its predecessors.

== Members for Murray Valley ==
Member	Party	Term
George Moss	Country	1945–1973
Bill Baxter	Country	1973–1975
Bill Baxter	National Country	1975–1976
Ken Jasper	National Country	1976–1982
Ken Jasper	National	1982–2010
Tim McCurdy	National	2010–2014

== Election results ==
2010 Victorian state election: Murray Valley
Party	Candidate	Votes	%	±%
National	Tim McCurdy	18,357	53.83	+2.92
Labor	Lachlan Enshaw	7,065	20.72	−1.20
Independent	Roberto Paino	3,339	9.79	+9.79
Country Alliance	Peter Watson	2,668	7.82	+7.82
Greens	Doug Ralph	1,598	4.69	−0.75
Family First	Ray Hungerford	1,073	3.15	−1.00
Total formal votes		34,100	94.87	−1.43
Informal votes		1,845	5.13	+1.43
Turnout		35,945	93.75	+0.59
Two-party-preferred result
National	Tim McCurdy	23,604	69.04	−2.72
Labor	Lachlan Enshaw	10,587	30.96	+2.72
National hold		Swing	−2.72	
