= Carl Kirkwood =

Scottish-born Australian politician (1929–2020)

Carl William Dunn Kirkwood (30 April 1929 – 26 March 2020) was a Scottish-born Australian former politician.

Kirkwood was born in Denny to jobbing iron moulder William Kirkwood and his wife Ellen. He completed his schooling in Scotland and then served in the British Army in Malaya and Singapore from 1946 to 1948. He worked as a jobbing moulder, coming to Australia in 1955. He was soon active both in the Moulders' Union and the Labor Party's Preston branch.

In 1970 Kirkwood was elected to the Victorian Legislative Assembly as the member for Preston. He became spokesman on local government immediately, adding lands from 1976 to 1977 and dropping his frontbench role entirely in 1981. Kirkwood retired in 1988.

Victorian Legislative Assembly
Preceded by Charlie Ring	Member for Preston; 1970–1988	Succeeded by Michael Leighton
