= David Bornstein (politician) =

Australian politician

David Leon Frank Bornstein (8 January 1940 – 27 October 2025) was an Australian politician. He was the Labor member for Brunswick East in the Victorian Legislative Assembly from May 1970 until his resignation in February 1975.

Bornstein was a journalist from 1959 until his election to politics in 1970. In 1967, he contested as the ALP candidate for the seat of Rodney but was not elected. On 10 January 1965, Bornstein married fellow ALP member Judith Swift. Their son is well-known union-advocate lawyer Josh Bornstein.
