= Electoral district of Greensborough =

Former state electoral district of Victoria, Australia

Greensborough Victoria—Legislative Assembly
- State: Victoria
- Created: 1967
- Abolished: 1992
- Namesake: Suburb of Greensborough
- Demographic: Outer metropolitan
- Coordinates: 37°41′S 144°07′E

Electoral district of Greensborough was an electoral district of the Legislative Assembly in the Australian state of Victoria.

== Members ==
Member	Party	Term
Monte Vale	Liberal	1967–1970
Bob Fell	Labor	1970–1973
Monte Vale	Liberal	1973
Monte Vale	Liberal	1973–1977
Pauline Toner	Labor	1977–1989
Sherryl Garbutt	Labor	1989–1992
