= Candidates of the 1985 Victorian state election =

The 1985 Victorian state election was held on 2 March 1985.

== Seat changes ==
A number of members contested different seats to the ones they held:

- A group of Liberal MLCs contested Legislative Assembly seats:
  - Boronia MLC Gracia Baylor contested Warrandyte.
  - Ballarat MLC Clive Bubb contested Ballarat South.
  - Western MLC Digby Crozier contested Portland.
  - Monash MLC Don Hayward contested Prahran.
- Liberal MLA Bill Ebery (Midlands) contested the Legislative Council province of North Western.
- Labor MLA Bob Miller (Prahran) contested the Legislative Council province of Monash.
- A number of MLAs contested different seats:
  - Ascot Vale Labor MLA Tom Edmunds contested Pascoe Vale.
  - Bendigo Labor MLA David Kennedy contested Bendigo West.
  - Dandenong Labor MLA Rob Jolly contested Doveton.
  - Dromana Labor MLA David Hassett contested Mornington.
  - Evelyn Labor MLA Max McDonald contested Whittlesea.
  - Frankston Labor MLA Jane Hill contested Frankston North.
  - Geelong East Labor MLA Graham Ernst contested Bellarine.
  - Geelong West Labor MLA Hayden Shell contested Geelong.
  - Glenhuntly Labor MLA Gerard Vaughan contested Clayton.
  - Glenroy Labor MLA Jack Culpin contested Broadmeadows.
  - Heatherton Labor MLA Peter Spyker contested Mentone.
  - Noble Park Labor MLA Terry Norris contested Dandenong.
  - Sandringham Labor MLA Graham Ihlein contested Evelyn.
  - Westernport Liberal MLA Alan Brown contested Gippsland West.

== Retiring Members ==
=== Labor ===
- John Wilton MLA (Broadmeadows)
- Glyde Butler MLC (Thomastown)
- Eric Kent MLC (Chelsea)

=== Liberal ===
- Cec Burgin MLA (Polwarth)
- Walter Jona MLA (Hawthorn)
- Don McKellar MLA (Portland)
- Jeannette Patrick MLA (Brighton)
- Don Saltmarsh MLA (Wantirna)
- Peter Block MLC (Nunawading)
- Vasey Houghton MLC (Templestowe)
- John Radford MLC (Bendigo)

== Legislative Assembly ==
Sitting members are shown in bold text. Successful candidates are highlighted in the relevant colour. Where there is possible confusion, an asterisk (*) is also used.

Electorate	Held by	Labor candidates	Liberal candidates	National candidates	Other candidates
Albert Park	Labor	**Bunna Walsh**	Barry Semmens		
Ballarat North	Liberal	Steve Bracks	**Tom Evans**		
Ballarat South	Labor	**Frank Sheehan**	Clive Bubb		
Balwyn	Liberal	Frank Pederick	**Jim Ramsay**		
Bellarine	Labor	**Graham Ernst**	Hugh McKenzie		
Benalla	National	Grant Triffett	Leonard Crocombe	**Pat McNamara**	
Benambra	Liberal	Virginia Coghill	**Lou Lieberman**		
Bendigo East	Liberal	John Reid	Michael John	Barry McNaught	
Bendigo West	Labor	**David Kennedy**	Alexander Sandner	Reginald Holt	
Bennettswood	Labor	**Doug Newton**	Roger Pescott		Ray Nilsen (Ind)
Bentleigh	Labor	**Gordon Hockley**	Peter Norman		
Berwick	Liberal	Philip Staindl	**Rob Maclellan**		
Box Hill	Labor	**Margaret Ray**	George Cox		Peter Allan (Ind)
Brighton	Liberal	Leslie Heimann	Alan Stockdale		
Broadmeadows	Labor	**Jack Culpin**	Mark Sinclair		
Brunswick	Labor	**Tom Roper**	Gregory Dinneen		
Bulleen	Liberal	John Scomparin	David Perrin		
Bundoora	Labor	**John Cain**	Alistair Urquhart		Frank Penhalluriack (WTP)
Burwood	Liberal	Eric Hobsbawn	**Jeff Kennett**		
Carrum	Labor	**Ian Cathie**	Bruce Bowie		
Caulfield	Liberal	Jack Diamond	**Ted Tanner**		
Clayton	Labor	**Gerard Vaughan**	Alan Sandbach		
Coburg	Labor	**Peter Gavin**	Antonino Boeti		
Dandenong	Labor	**Terry Norris**	Ian Fotheringham		
Dandenong North	Labor	Jan Wilson	George Grech		
Derrimut	Labor	David Cunningham	Helen Hurley		
Doncaster	Liberal	William Poppins	**Morris Williams**		
Doveton	Labor	**Rob Jolly**	Matthew Starr		
Dromana	Labor	Allison Ogden	Ron Wells		
Essendon	Labor	**Barry Rowe**	Brian Dodgson		
Evelyn	Labor	**Graham Ihlein**	Jim Plowman		Gaye Gelly (Ind)
Footscray	Labor	**Robert Fordham**	Hugh Cameron		
Forest Hill	Liberal	John Madden	**John Richardson**		
Frankston North	Labor	**Jane Hill**	Robert Garnett		Judy Hale (Ind)
Frankston South	Liberal	Geoffrey Holland	Graeme Weideman		
Geelong	Labor	**Hayden Shell**	Clive Pugh		
Geelong North	Labor	**Neil Trezise**	John Lucas		
Gippsland East	National	Clifford Harding	David McInnes	**Bruce Evans**	
Gippsland South	National	Max Semken	Neil McInnes	**Tom Wallace**	
Gippsland West	Liberal	Geoffrey Bull	**Alan Brown**	William Ronald	
Gisborne	Liberal	Douglas Bishop	**Tom Reynolds**		
Glen Waverley	Liberal	John Candappa	Ross Smith		
Greensborough	Labor	**Pauline Toner**	Andrew Cove		
Hawthorn	Liberal	Jill Eastwood	Phil Gude		
Ivanhoe	Labor	**Tony Sheehan**	Vin Heffernan		
Keilor	Labor	**George Seitz**	Graham Anderson		
Kew	Liberal	Annamaria Dierer	**Prue Sibree**		
Knox	Labor	**Steve Crabb**	Jill Hall		Thomas Tyrer (PTP)
Lowan	National	William Albon	John Mann	**Bill McGrath**	
Malvern	Liberal	Max Dumais	**Geoff Leigh**		
Melbourne	Labor	**Keith Remington**	Peter Jones		Janet Walk (PTP)
Mentone	Labor	**Peter Spyker**	**Bill Templeton**		
Mildura	National	Lindsay Leake	Diana Duck	**Milton Whiting**	
Mitcham	Labor	**John Harrowfield**	Bruce Camfield		
Monbulk	Labor	**Neil Pope**	Raymond Yates		
Mornington	Labor	**David Hassett**	Robin Cooper		
Morwell	Labor	**Valerie Callister**	Graeme Bond	Terie Porter	Geoffrey Francis (Ind)
Murray Valley	National	Jill Milthorpe	Bill Hunter	**Ken Jasper**	
Narracan	Labor	Robin Matthews	**John Delzoppo**	Julia Ettery	John McNamara (Ind)
Niddrie	Labor	**Jack Simpson**	Mark Pallett		
Northcote	Labor	**Frank Wilkes**	William Hamilton		
Oakleigh	Labor	**Race Mathews**	Norman Kennedy		Antonios Pashos (Ind)
Pascoe Vale	Labor	**Tom Edmunds**	Vincenzo D'Aquino		
Polwarth	Liberal	Jeffery Rootes	Ian Smith	David Seymour	
Portland	Liberal	William Sharrock	Digby Crozier	James Patterson	
Prahran	Liberal	Hendrik van Leeuwen	Don Hayward		Norman Long (Ind); Alan Parker (PTP)
Preston	Labor	**Carl Kirkwood**	Mark Leaman		
Reservoir	Labor	**Jim Simmonds**	Rae Kennett		
Richmond	Labor	**Theo Sidiropoulos**	John Sevior		
Ringwood	Labor	**Kay Setches**	Michael Dobson		
Ripon	Liberal	John McQuilten	**Tom Austin**		
Rodney	National	Denise MacDonald	John Adams	**Eddie Hann**	
St Albans	Labor	Alex Andrianopoulos	Martin Power		
St Kilda	Labor	**Andrew McCutcheon**	Richard Stevenson		
Sandringham	Liberal	Ann Corcoran	David Lea		
Shepparton	National	David Wauchope	Alan Fitzgerald	**Peter Ross-Edwards**	
South Barwon	Liberal	Harry Naylor	**Harley Dickinson**		
Springvale	Labor	**Eddie Micallef**	Therese Marley		
Sunshine	Labor	**Bill Fogarty**	Aldous Hicks		
Swan Hill	National	Ronald Stanton	Ian Ray	**Barry Steggall**	
Syndal	Labor	**David Gray**	Geoff Coleman		Edward Hawthorn (Ind)
Thomastown	Labor	Beth Gleeson	Adam Barr		
Wantirna	Labor	Carolyn Hirsh	Karen Dettmann		
Warrandyte	Labor	**Lou Hill**	Gracia Baylor		Timothy Connellan (Ind)
Warrnambool	Liberal	Peter Cox	**Adam Kempton**	John McGrath	
Werribee	Labor	**Ken Coghill**	Thomas Hudson		Robert Wolstenholme (WTP)
Whittlesea	Labor	**Max McDonald**	Haydn Gregson		
Williamstown	Labor	**Gordon Stirling**	David Allan		

== Legislative Council ==
Sitting members are shown in bold text. Successful candidates are highlighted in the relevant colour. Where there is possible confusion, an asterisk (*) is also used.

Province	Held by	Labor candidates	Liberal candidates	National candidates	Democrats candidates	Other candidates
Ballarat	Liberal	Roger Lowrey	**Dick de Fegely**		William Ross	
Boronia	Labor	Jean McLean	Gerald Clarke		Sid Spindler	
Central Highlands	Liberal	Peter Fennell	**Fred Grimwade**		Janet Powell	Brent Melville (CTA)
Chelsea	Labor	Maureen Lyster	Michael Herbst			
Doutta Galla	Labor	**David White**	Pamela Philpot			
East Yarra	Liberal	Bernard Ziegenbein	**Mark Birrell**		Margaret Cole	
Eumemmerring	Labor	Fred Van Buren	John Ferwerda			
Geelong	Labor	**Rod Mackenzie**	Joss Manders		Laurence Levy	
Gippsland	Liberal	Reginald Smith	**Dick Long**	Anthony Stewart	Catherine Stewart	Ben Buckley (Ind); Cornelius Gordyn (CTA)
Higinbotham	Liberal	Denis Oakley	**Robert Lawson**		Anton Hermann	
Jika Jika	Labor	George Crawford	David Gandolfo			
Melbourne	Labor	**Evan Walker**	Vincent Volpe		Simon James	
Melbourne North	Labor	**Giovanni Sgro**	Brett Pullyblank			
Melbourne West	Labor	**Joan Coxsedge**	Matthew Matich		Johannus Paas	
Monash	Labor	Bob Miller	Reg Macey		David Collyer	
North Eastern	National	Ewan Paterson	Stephen Blair	Bill Baxter		Michael Else (Ind)
North Western	National	Phillip Eddy	Bill Ebery	**Ken Wright**		
Nunawading	Labor	Bob Ives	Rosemary Varty		Michael Nardella	
South Eastern	Liberal	Bora Eric	**Alan Hunt**		Irene Fisher	
Templestowe	Liberal	Gary Greenway	John Miles		Kenneth Peak	
Waverley	Labor	**Cyril Kennedy**	Robert Clark		Jeffrey McAlpine	William Watson (CTA)
Western	Liberal	Brian Clarke	Henry Wyld	Roger Hallam		
