= Candidates of the 1982 Victorian state election =

The 1982 Victorian state election was held on 3 April 1982.

== Retiring Members ==
=== Labor ===
- Dolph Eddy MLC (Thomastown)
- Bon Thomas MLC (Melbourne West)
- Ivan Trayling MLC (Melbourne)
- John Walton MLC (Melbourne North)

=== Liberal ===
- Jim Balfour MLA (Narracan)
- Hayden Birrell MLA (Geelong West)
- Roberts Dunstan MLA (Dromana)
- Geoff Hayes MLA (Wantirna)
- Aurel Smith MLA (South Barwon)
- Murray Hamilton MLC (Higinbotham)

=== National ===
- Tom Trewin MLA (Benalla)

== Legislative Assembly ==
Sitting members are shown in bold text. Successful candidates are highlighted in the relevant colour. Where there is possible confusion, an asterisk (*) is also used.

Electorate	Held by	Labor candidates	Liberal candidates	National candidates	Democrats candidates	Other candidates
Albert Park	Labor	**Bunna Walsh**	Reg Macey		Ian Dawes	
Ascot Vale	Labor	**Tom Edmunds**	David Hayward			
Ballarat North	Liberal	Bill Horrocks	**Tom Evans**		William Ross	
Ballarat South	Liberal	Frank Sheehan	**Joan Chambers**		Stuart Kelly	
Balwyn	Liberal	Nora Sparrow	**Jim Ramsay**		Russel White	
Benalla	National	James Ure	Andrew Mein	Pat McNamara	Rita Dart	
Benambra	Liberal	Joe Murphy	**Lou Lieberman**	Charles Ross		
Bendigo	Liberal	David Kennedy	**Daryl McClure**		Ian Price	Joe Pearce (Ind); Christopher Stoltz (Ind); Richard Turner (Ind)
Bennettswood	Liberal	Doug Newton	**Keith McCance**		Alan Swindon	
Bentleigh	Labor	**Gordon Hockley**	Ronald Turner		Brian Kidd	William Horner (Ind)
Berwick	Liberal	Philip Staindl	**Rob Maclellan**			
Box Hill	Liberal	Margaret Ray	**Donald Mackinnon**		Reginald Jones	Peter Allan (Ind)
Brighton	Liberal	Garry Moore	**Jeannette Patrick**		George Dart	
Broadmeadows	Labor	**John Wilton**	Ross Owen		Barbara Duncan	
Brunswick	Labor	**Tom Roper**	Brian Tuohy		David Anderson	James Ferrari (Ind)
Bundoora	Labor	**John Cain**	Peter Clarke		Peter Shaw	
Burwood	Liberal	Paul Trewern	**Jeff Kennett**		Harold Jeffrey	
Carrum	Labor	**Ian Cathie**	Derek Bunyan		William Towers	
Caulfield	Liberal	Jack Diamond	**Ted Tanner**		Beverley Broadbent	
Coburg	Labor	**Peter Gavin**	Božidar Jovanović			Dr Peter Hadley (Ind)
Dandenong	Labor	**Rob Jolly**	Mario Dodic			
Doncaster	Liberal	Peter Cleeland	**Morris Williams**		Lynden Kenyon	
Dromana	Liberal	David Hassett	Ron Wells		Maurice Freeman	Ian Bendle (Ind); Kenneth Payne (Ind)
Essendon	Labor	**Barry Rowe**	Graeme Goodson		Alan Powell	Richard Wright (AP)
Evelyn	Liberal	Max McDonald	**Jim Plowman**		Bruce McFarlane	Peter Gompertz (Ind)
Footscray	Labor	**Robert Fordham**	John Huntington			
Forest Hill	Liberal	Anne Blackburn	**John Richardson**		Ross Larson	
Frankston	Liberal	Jane Hill	**Graeme Weideman**		Laurence Amor	
Geelong East	Labor	**Graham Ernst**	Raymond Carey		Robert Mann	James Jordan (DLP)
Geelong North	Labor	**Neil Trezise**	Gregory Arrowsmith			
Geelong West	Liberal	Hayden Shell	Michael Henderson		Penelope Collet	
Gippsland East	National	Dan Luscombe	John Riggall	**Bruce Evans**	Ian Glover	
Gippsland South	National	Reginald Smith	**Neil McInnes**	Tom Wallace	Wilma Western	
Gisborne	Liberal	Philip Coman	**Tom Reynolds**			Kottarammukallel Sebastian (Ind)
Glenhuntly	Labor	**Gerard Vaughan**	Peter Norman		Fred Ingamells	
Glenroy	Labor	**Jack Culpin**	Donald Roberts			
Greensborough	Labor	**Pauline Toner**	John Dobinson		Antony Siddons	
Hawthorn	Liberal	Jennifer Eastwood	**Walter Jona**		Mark Harris	
Heatherton	Labor	**Peter Spyker**	Geoff Leigh		Michael Johnson	
Ivanhoe	Liberal	Tony Sheehan	**Bruce Skeggs**		Harold Shepherd	
Keilor	Labor	**Jack Ginifer**	Graham Robertson			
Kew	Liberal	George Theodoridis	**Prue Sibree**		Veronica Lysaght	
Knox	Labor	**Steve Crabb**	Peter Evans		Dennis Ryan	
Lowan	National	David Drake-Feary	Robert Kosch	**Bill McGrath**	Zelma Furey	
Malvern	Liberal	Kenneth Penaluna	**Lindsay Thompson**		Brian Stockton	Joseph McCarthy (Ind)
Melbourne	Labor	**Keith Remington**	John Simmonds		Catherine Stewart	Cecil G. Murgatroyd (Ind); Roger Wilson (CPA)
Mentone	Liberal	David Tindal	**Bill Templeton**			
Midlands	Liberal	Alan Calder	**Bill Ebery**	Ian Richardson	George Hunter	
Mildura	National	Lindsay Leake	Ron Wilson	**Milton Whiting**	Donald Wilson	
Mitcham	Liberal	John Harrowfield	**George Cox**		Ross Roberts	Ada Kowal (DLP)
Monbulk	Liberal	Neil Pope	**Bill Borthwick**		Milton Blake	Jean Langworthy (Ind); Bert Wainer (Ind)
Morwell	Labor	**Valerie Callister**	David Little	Gordon Robertson	Ross Ollquist	
Murray Valley	National	Jill Millthorpe	William Scott	**Ken Jasper**		
Narracan	Liberal	Richard Gubbins	John Delzoppo	Douglas Hatfield	Nancye Yeates	Brian Handley (DLP)
Niddrie	Labor	**Jack Simpson**	Brian Dodgson		Frank Trifiletti	
Noble Park	Liberal	Terry Norris	**Peter Collins**		Geoffrey Earl	
Northcote	Labor	**Frank Wilkes**	Gerard Clarke			
Oakleigh	Labor	**Race Mathews**	Francis Callaghan		Malcolm Haddrick	John Mulholland (DLP)
Polwarth	Liberal	Angus McIvor	**Cec Burgin**		Douglas Mason	
Portland	Liberal	William Sharrock	**Don McKellar**			David Wilson (Ind)
Prahran	Labor	**Bob Miller**	Peter Thomson		Pamela Hoobin	Trevor McCandless (SPA)
Preston	Labor	**Carl Kirkwood**			Kenneth Peak	
Reservoir	Labor	**Jim Simmonds**	Rodney Blackwood			
Richmond	Labor	**Theo Sidiropoulos**	Jordan Topalides		Bruce Errol	
Ringwood	Liberal	Kay Setches	**Peter McArthur**		Michael Nardella	Robin Gardini (Ind); John Garratt (DLP); Wilfrid Thiele (Ind)
Ripon	Liberal	Ian Bryant	**Tom Austin**			
Rodney	National	Gregory Leeder	Clive Pilley	**Eddie Hann**	Douglas Linford	
St Kilda	Liberal	Andrew McCutcheon	**Brian Dixon**		Susanne McDougall	Daniel Condon (DLP); Joseph Johnson (AP)
Sandringham	Liberal	Graham Ihlein	**Max Crellin**		Nathan Crafti	
Shepparton	National	Marjorie Gillies	Bill Hunter	**Peter Ross-Edwards**		
South Barwon	Liberal	Eric Young	Harley Dickinson		Kenneth Oliver	
Springvale	Labor	**Kevin King**	Graeme Duggan		Morag Thorne	Elaine Mulholland (DLP)
Sunshine	Labor	**Bill Fogarty**	Mario De Bono		Gus Kacinskas	
Swan Hill	Liberal	Ian Hardie	**Alan Wood**	David Shannon	John Greig	
Syndal	Liberal	David Gray	**Geoff Coleman**		Fraser Hercus	Paul Carroll (DLP)
Wantirna	Liberal	Carolyn Hirsh	Don Saltmarsh		Colin Styring	
Warrandyte	Liberal	Lou Hill	**Norman Lacy**		Lynette Bartold	Peter Ferwerda (DLP); Diane Teasdale (Ind)
Warrnambool	Liberal	Paul Martin	**Ian Smith**		Kathleen May	
Werribee	Labor	**Ken Coghill**	John Kelly		Ivan Pollock	
Westernport	Liberal	Russell Joiner	**Alan Brown**		Leslie Reubens	Lester Wyatt (Ind)
Williamstown	Labor	**Gordon Stirling**	Paul Carter		Peter Dalton	

== Legislative Council ==
Sitting members are shown in bold text. Successful candidates are highlighted in the relevant colour. Where there is possible confusion, an asterisk (*) is also used.

Province	Held by	Labor candidates	Liberal candidates	National candidates	Democrats candidates	Other candidates
Ballarat	Liberal	Stephen Blomeley	**Rob Knowles**		June Johnson	
Bendigo	Liberal	Fabian Reid	**Bruce Reid**	Clarence Rodda	Marlene Gunn	
Boronia	Liberal	Judith Dixon	**Kevin Foley**		David Barter	Shane McCarthy (DLP)
Central Highlands	Liberal	Anthony Marshall	**Jock Granter**	Brian Trewin	David Johnston	
Chelsea	Liberal	Mal Sandon	**Neil Stacey**			
Doutta Galla	Labor	**Bill Landeryou**	Pamela Philpot			
East Yarra	Liberal	Doug Walpole	**Haddon Storey**		Keith Bruckner	
Geelong	Liberal	David Henshaw	**Glyn Jenkins**			Michael O'Keefe (DLP)
Gippsland	Liberal	Barry Murphy	**James Taylor**	John Vinall	James Gilbert	Bruce Ingle (Ind)
Higinbotham	Liberal	Geoffrey Fleming	Geoffrey Connard		Barry Preston	
Melbourne	Labor	Barry Pullen	Craig Baxter		Stephen Duthy	
Melbourne North	Labor	Caroline Hogg	Geoff Lutz			
Melbourne West	Labor	Joan Kirner	Matthew Matich		Darryl Carlton	Margaret Reed (DLP)
Monash	Liberal	Peter Bergin	**James Guest**		Theresa Cunningham	
North Eastern	National	Nicola Paola	Robert Crosby	**David Evans**		Brian Lumsden (Ind)
North Western	National	John Anderson	Ian Milburn	**Bernie Dunn**		
Nunawading	Liberal	Laurie McArthur	**Vernon Hauser**		Jeffrey McAlpine	
South Eastern	Liberal	Bora Eric	**Roy Ward**	Leslie Handley	Harold Fraser	
Templestowe	Liberal	Mike Arnold	**Ralph Howard**		Geoffrey Loftus-Hills	
Thomastown	Labor	Jim Kennan	Rae Kennett			
Waverley	Liberal	Tony Van Vliet	Brian Joyce		Kenneth Mylius	E.J. Woods (DLP)
Western	Liberal	Allan Sargent	**Bruce Chamberlain**			
