= Members of the Victorian Legislative Council, 1982–1985 =

- ←1979–1982 1985–1988→

This is a list of members of the Victorian Legislative Council between 1982 and 1985. As half of the Legislative Council's terms expired at each triennial election, half of these members were elected at the 1979 state election with terms expiring in 1985, while the other half were elected at the 1982 state election with terms expiring in 1988.

Name	Party	Province	Term expires	Term of office
Mike Arnold	Labor	Templestowe	1988	1982–1988
Bill Baxter^{[3]}	National	North Eastern	1985	1978–1984; 1985–2006
Gracia Baylor	Liberal	Boronia	1985	1979–1985
Mark Birrell ^{[2]}	Liberal	East Yarra	1985	1983–2002
Peter Block	Liberal	Nunawading	1985	1973–1985
Clive Bubb	Liberal	Ballarat	1985	1979–1985
Glyde Butler	Labor	Thomastown	1985	1979–1985
Bill Campbell ^{[2]}	Liberal	East Yarra	1985	1964–1983
Hon Bruce Chamberlain	Liberal	Western	1988	1976–2002
Geoffrey Connard	Liberal	Higinbotham	1988	1982–1996
Joan Coxsedge	Labor	Melbourne West	1985	1979–1992
Hon Digby Crozier	Liberal	Western	1985	1973–1985
Judith Dixon	Labor	Boronia	1988	1982–1988
Bernie Dunn	National	North Western	1988	1969–1988
David Evans	National	North Eastern	1988	1976–1996
Jock Granter	Liberal	Central Highlands	1988	1964–1988
Fred Grimwade	Liberal	Central Highlands	1985	1967–1987
James Guest	Liberal	Monash	1988	1976–1996
Don Hayward	Liberal	Monash	1985	1979–1985
David Henshaw	Labor	Geelong	1988	1982–1996
Caroline Hogg	Labor	Melbourne North	1988	1982–1999
Hon Vasey Houghton	Liberal	Templestowe	1985	1967–1985
Hon Alan Hunt	Liberal	South Eastern	1985	1961–1992
Jim Kennan	Labor	Thomastown	1988	1982–1988
Cyril Kennedy	Labor	Waverley	1985	1979–1992
Eric Kent	Labor	Chelsea	1985	1970–1976, 1979–1985
Joan Kirner	Labor	Melbourne West	1988	1982–1988
Hon Rob Knowles	Liberal	Ballarat	1988	1976–1999
Bill Landeryou	Labor	Doutta Galla	1988	1976–1992
Robert Lawson	Liberal	Higinbotham	1985	1979–1992
Dick Long	Liberal	Gippsland	1985	1973–1992
Laurie McArthur	Labor	Nunawading	1988	1982–1988
Rod Mackenzie	Labor	Geelong	1985	1979–1992
Brian Mier ^{[1]}	Labor	Waverley	1988	1982–1996
Barry Murphy	Labor	Gippsland	1988	1982–1988
Barry Pullen	Labor	Melbourne	1988	1982–1999
John Radford	Liberal	Bendigo	1985	1979–1985
Bruce Reid	Liberal	Bendigo	1988	1976–1988
Mal Sandon	Labor	Chelsea	1988	1982–1988
Giovanni Sgro	Labor	Melbourne North	1985	1979–1992
Hon Haddon Storey	Liberal	East Yarra	1988	1971–1996
Evan Walker	Labor	Melbourne	1985	1979–1992
Roy Ward	Liberal	South Eastern	1988	1970–1988
David White	Labor	Doutta Galla	1985	1976–1996
Ken Wright	National	North Western	1985	1973–1992

^{1} Labor candidate Tony Van Vliet was elected as the member for Waverley at the 1982 state election but died on 16 October 1982 before he could be sworn in. Labor candidate Brian Mier won the resulting by-election on 4 December 1982.
^{2} In April 1983, East Yarra Liberal MLC Bill Campbell resigned. Liberal candidate Mark Birrell won the resulting by-election on 7 May 1983.
^{3} In October 1984, North Eastern National MLC Bill Baxter resigned to contest the federal seat of Indi at the 1984 election. No by-election was held due to the proximity of the 1985 state election.

== Sources ==
- "Find a Member". State Government of Victoria.
