= Electoral results for the Boronia Province =

Victoria, Australia, district election results

This is a list of electoral results for the Boronia Province in Victorian state elections.

== Members for Boronia Province ==
Year	Member	Party	Member	Party
1967	Gilbert Chandler	Liberal		
1970	Gilbert Chandler	Liberal	Vernon Hauser	Liberal
1973	Peter Block	Liberal	Vernon Hauser	Liberal
1976	Peter Block	Liberal	Kevin Foley	Liberal
1979	Gracia Baylor	Liberal	Kevin Foley	Liberal
1982	Gracia Baylor	Liberal	Judith Dixon	Labor
1985	Jean McLean	Labor	Judith Dixon	Labor
1988	Jean McLean	Labor	Gerald Ashman	Liberal
1992			Gerald Ashman	Liberal

== Election results ==
=== Elections in the 1980s ===
1988 Victorian state election: Boronia Province
Party	Candidate	Votes	%	±%
Liberal	Gerald Ashman	56,754	51.2	+3.2
Labor	Judith Dixon	54,133	48.8	+3.2
Total formal votes		110,887	96.1	−1.4
Informal votes		4,514	3.9	+1.4
Turnout		115,401	94.2	−0.8
Liberal gain from Labor		Swing	+1.7	

1985 Victorian state election: Boronia Province
Party	Candidate	Votes	%	±%
Liberal	Gerald Clarke	51,150	48.0	
Labor	Jean McLean	48,531	45.6	
Democrats	Sid Spindler	6,831	6.4	
Total formal votes		106,512	97.5	
Informal votes		2,761	2.5	
Turnout		109,273	95.0	
Two-party-preferred result
Labor	Jean McLean	53,794	50.5	−1.6
Liberal	Gerald Clarke	52,712	49.5	+1.6
Labor gain from Liberal		Swing	−1.6	

1982 Victorian state election: Boronia Province
Party	Candidate	Votes	%	±%
Labor	Judith Dixon	61,642	48.2	+2.1
Liberal	Kevin Foley	51,024	39.9	−9.8
Democrats	David Barter	12,180	9.5	+9.5
Democratic Labor	Shane McCarthy	3,133	2.4	+2.4
Total formal votes		127,979	97.8	+0.6
Informal votes		2,870	2.2	−0.6
Two-party-preferred result
Labor	Judith Dixon	69,694	54.5	+6.5
Liberal	Kevin Foley	58,285	45.5	−6.5
Labor gain from Liberal		Swing	+6.5	

=== Elections in the 1970s ===
1979 Victorian state election: Boronia Province
Party	Candidate	Votes	%	±%
Liberal	Gracia Baylor	56,703	49.7	−7.7
Labor	Richard Coughlin	52,627	46.1	+3.5
Independent	Peter Brown	4,730	4.2	+4.2
Total formal votes		114,060	97.2	+0.1
Informal votes		3,266	2.8	−0.1
Turnout		117,326	94.2	+1.2
Two-party-preferred result
Liberal	Gracia Baylor	59,359	52.0	−5.4
Labor	Richard Coughlin	54,701	48.0	+5.4
Liberal hold		Swing	−5.4	

1976 Victorian state election: Boronia Province
Party	Candidate	Votes	%	±%
Liberal	Kevin Foley	59,075	57.4	
Labor	Stuart Russell	43,847	42.6	
Total formal votes		102,922	97.1	
Informal votes		3,032	2.9	
Turnout		105,954	93.0	
Liberal hold		Swing		

1973 Victorian state election: Boronia Province
Party	Candidate	Votes	%	±%
Liberal	Peter Block	93,740	52.8	+9.1
Labor	Niall Brennan	72,120	40.6	−3.0
Democratic Labor	Cornelius Gleeson	11,612	6.5	−6.2
Total formal votes		177,472	97.0	+0.9
Informal votes		5,439	3.0	−0.9
Turnout		182,911	93.7	−2.0
Two-party-preferred result
Liberal	Peter Block		58.7	+4.3
Labor	Niall Brennan		41.3	−4.3
Liberal hold		Swing	+4.3	

- Two party preferred vote was estimated.

1970 Victorian state election: Boronia Province
Party	Candidate	Votes	%	±%
Liberal	Vernon Hauser	61,198	43.7	−7.2
Labor	Niall Brennan	61,101	43.6	+7.6
Democratic Labor	Edmund Burgi	17,731	12.7	−0.5
Total formal votes		140,030	96.1	−1.0
Informal votes		5,588	3.9	+1.0
Turnout		145,618	95.7	+2.3
Two-party-preferred result
Liberal	Vernon Hauser	76,158	54.4	−8.3
Labor	Niall Brennan	63,872	45.6	+8.3
Liberal hold		Swing	−8.3	

=== Elections in the 1960s ===
1967 Victorian state election: Boronia Province
Party	Candidate	Votes	%	±%
Liberal	Gilbert Chandler	59,278	50.9	
Labor	William French	41,882	36.0	
Democratic Labor	Frederick Rosenbrock	15,196	13.1	
Total formal votes		116,356	97.1	
Informal votes		3,529	2.9	
Turnout		119,885	93.4	
Two-party-preferred result
Liberal	Gilbert Chandler		62.7	
Labor	William French		37.3	
Liberal hold		Swing		

- Two party preferred vote was estimated.
