= Members of the Victorian Legislative Council, 1979–1982 =

- ←1976–1979 1982–1985→

This is a list of members of the Victorian Legislative Council between 1979 and 1982. As half of the Legislative Council's terms expired at each triennial election, half of these members were elected at the 1976 state election with terms expiring in 1982, while the other half were elected at the 1979 state election with terms expiring in 1985.

Name	Party	Province	Term expires	Term of office
Bill Baxter	National	North Eastern	1985	1978–1984; 1985–2006
Gracia Baylor	Liberal	Boronia	1985	1979–1985
Peter Block	Liberal	Nunawading	1985	1973–1985
Clive Bubb	Liberal	Ballarat	1985	1979–1985
Glyde Butler	Labor	Thomastown	1985	1979–1985
Bill Campbell	Liberal	East Yarra	1985	1964–1983
Hon Bruce Chamberlain	Liberal	Western	1982	1976–2002
Joan Coxsedge	Labor	Melbourne West	1985	1979–1992
Hon Digby Crozier	Liberal	Western	1985	1973–1985
Bernie Dunn	National	North Western	1982	1969–1988
Dolph Eddy	Labor	Thomastown	1982	1970–1982
David Evans	National	North Eastern	1982	1976–1996
Kevin Foley	Liberal	Boronia	1982	1976–1982
Jock Granter	Liberal	Central Highlands	1982	1964–1988
Fred Grimwade	Liberal	Central Highlands	1985	1967–1987
James Guest	Liberal	Monash	1982	1976–1996
Murray Hamilton	Liberal	Higinbotham	1982	1967–1982
Vernon Hauser	Liberal	Nunawading	1982	1970–1982
Don Hayward	Liberal	Monash	1985	1979–1985
Hon Vasey Houghton	Liberal	Templestowe	1985	1967–1985
Ralph Howard	Liberal	Templestowe	1982	1976–1982
Hon Alan Hunt	Liberal	South Eastern	1985	1961–1992
Glyn Jenkins	Liberal	Geelong	1982	1970–1982
Cyril Kennedy	Labor	Waverley	1985	1979–1992
Eric Kent	Labor	Chelsea	1985	1970–1976, 1979–1985
Hon Rob Knowles	Liberal	Ballarat	1982	1976–1999
Bill Landeryou	Labor	Doutta Galla	1982	1976–1992
Robert Lawson	Liberal	Higinbotham	1985	1979–1992
Dick Long	Liberal	Gippsland	1985	1973–1992
Rod Mackenzie	Labor	Geelong	1985	1979–1992
John Radford	Liberal	Bendigo	1985	1979–1985
Bruce Reid	Liberal	Bendigo	1982	1976–1988
Don Saltmarsh	Liberal	Waverley	1982	1976–1982
Giovanni Sgro	Labor	Melbourne North	1985	1979–1992
Neil Stacey	Liberal	Chelsea	1982	1976–1982
Hon Haddon Storey	Liberal	East Yarra	1982	1971–1996
James Taylor	Liberal	Gippsland	1982	1976–1982
Bon Thomas	Labor	Melbourne West	1982	1970–1982
Ivan Trayling	Labor	Melbourne	1982	1972–1982
Evan Walker	Labor	Melbourne	1985	1979–1992
John Walton	Labor	Melbourne North	1982	1958–1982
Roy Ward	Liberal	South Eastern	1982	1970–1988
David White	Labor	Doutta Galla	1985	1976–1996
Ken Wright	National	North Western	1985	1973–1992

== Sources ==
- "Find a Member". State Government of Victoria.
