= Women in the Victorian Legislative Council =

There have been 60 women in the Victorian Legislative Council since its establishment in 1856. Women have had the right to vote in Victoria, Australia since 1908 and the right to stand as a candidate for the Victorian Legislative Council since 1923. In the 2022 Victorian election, there were 22 women elected to the 40 member Legislative Council, forming a majority of the chamber for the first time.

The first successful female candidates for the Legislative Council were Gracia Baylor and Joan Coxsedge of the Liberal and Labor parties respectively, who were elected in 1979. Since then there have continuously been female members in the Council. The first National Party female member was Jeanette Powell, elected in 1996.

== List of women in the Victorian Legislative Council ==
Names in bold indicate women who have been appointed as Ministers and Parliamentary Secretaries during their time in the Legislative Council. Names in italics indicate entry into Parliament through a by-election or by appointment and * symbolises members that have sat as members in both the Legislative Council and the Legislative Assembly.

#	Name	Party	Province/Region	Period of service
1	Gracia Baylor	Liberal	Boronia	5 May 1979 – 1 March 1985 (resigned)
1	Joan Coxsedge	Labor	Melbourne West	5 May 1979 – 3 October 1992 (retired)
3	**Caroline Hogg**	Labor	Melbourne North	3 April 1982 – 18 September 1999 (retired)
3	Judith Dixon	Labor	Boronia	3 April 1982 – 1 October 1988 (defeated)
3	**Joan Kirner***	Labor	Melbourne West	3 April 1982 – 1 October 1988 (transferred to LA)
6	**Maureen Lyster**	Labor	Chelsea	2 March 1985 – 3 October 1992 (defeated)
6	Jean McLean	Labor	Boronia; Melbourne West	2 March 1985 – 2 October 1992; 3 October 1992 – 18 September 1999 (retired)
8	**Rosemary Varty**	Liberal	Nunawading; Silvan	17 August 1985 – 2 October 1992; 3 October 1992 – 18 September 1999 (retired)
9	**Marie Tehan***	Liberal	Central Highlands	21 March 1987 – 2 October 1992 (transferred to LA)
10	Licia Kokocinski	Labor	Melbourne West	1 October 1988 – 30 March 1996 (retired)
11	**Louise Asher***	Liberal	Monash	3 October 1992 – 18 September 1999 (transferred to LA)
11	Sue Wilding	Liberal	Chelsea	3 October 1992 – 18 September 1999 (defeated)
13	**Monica Gould**	Labor	Doutta Galla	28 September 1993 – 24 November 2006 (retired)
14	Maree Luckins	Liberal	Waverley	30 March 1996 – 30 November 2002 (ran for LA)
14	Jeanette Powell*	National	North Eastern	30 March 1996 – 30 November 2002 (transferred to LA)
14	Wendy Smith	Liberal	Silvan	30 March 1996 – 30 November 2002 (defeated)
17	**Candy Broad**	Labor	Melbourne North; Northern Victoria	18 September 1999 – 25 November 2006; 25 November 2006 – 9 May 2014 (resigned)
17	**Elaine Carbines**	Labor	Geelong	18 September 1999 – November 2006 (defeated)
17	Andrea Coote	Liberal	Monash; Southern Metropolitan	18 September 1999 – 25 November 2006; 25 November 2006 – 29 November 2014 (retired)
17	**Kaye Darveniza**	Labor	Melbourne West; Northern Victoria	18 September 1999 – 25 November 2006; 25 November 2006 – 29 November 2014 (retired)
17	Dianne Hadden	Labor/Independent	Ballarat	18 September 1999 – 25 November 2006 (defeated)
17	**Jenny Mikakos**	Labor	Jika Jika; Northern Metropolitan	18 September 1999 – 25 November 2006; 25 November 2006 – 26 September 2020 (resigned)
17	Glenyys Romanes	Labor	Melbourne	18 September 1999 – 25 November 2006 (defeated)
17	**Marsha Thomson***	Labor	Melbourne North	18 September 1999 – 25 November 2006 (transferred to LA)
25	Lidia Argondizzo	Labor	Templestowe	30 November 2002 – 25 November 2006 (defeated)
25	Helen Buckingham	Labor	Koonung	30 November 2002 – 25 November 2006 (retired)
25	Carolyn Hirsh*	Labor/Independent	Silvan	30 November 2002 – 25 November 2006 (retired)
25	**Wendy Lovell**	Liberal	North Eastern; Northern Victoria	30 November 2002 – 25 November 2006; 25 November 2006 –
29	Colleen Hartland	Greens	Western Metropolitan	25 November 2006 – 8 February 2018 (resigned)
29	Jan Kronberg	Liberal	Eastern Metropolitan	25 November 2006 – 29 November 2014 (retired)
29	Sue Pennicuik	Greens	Southern Metropolitan	25 November 2006 – 24 November 2018 (defeated)
29	Donna Petrovich	Liberal	Northern Victoria	25 November 2006 – 1 July 2013 (resigned)
29	Inga Peulich*	Liberal	South Eastern Metropolitan	25 November 2006 – 24 November 2018 (defeated)
29	**Jaala Pulford**	Labor	Western Victoria	25 November 2006 –
29	**Gayle Tierney**	Labor	Western Victoria	25 November 2006 –
36	Jennifer Huppert	Labor	Southern Metropolitan	3 February 2009 – 27 November 2010 (defeated)
37	Georgie Crozier	Liberal	Southern Metropolitan	27 November 2010 –
38	Amanda Millar	Liberal	Northern Victoria	22 August 2013 – 29 November 2014 (defeated)
39	Marg Lewis	Labor	Northern Victoria	11 June 2014 – 29 November 2014 (retired)
40	Rachel Carling-Jenkins	DLP/Conservatives/Independent	Western Metropolitan	29 November 2014 – 24 November 2018 (ran for LA)
40	Samantha Dunn	Greens	Eastern Metropolitan	29 November 2014 – 24 November 2018 (defeated)
40	Margaret Fitzherbert	Liberal	Southern Metropolitan	29 November 2014 – 24 November 2018 (defeated)
40	Fiona Patten	Sex Party/Reason	Northern Metropolitan	29 November 2014 –
40	Harriet Shing	Labor	Eastern Victoria	29 November 2014 –
40	Nina Springle	Greens	South Eastern Metropolitan	29 November 2014 – 24 November 2018 (defeated)
40	**Jaclyn Symes**	Labor	Northern Victoria	29 November 2014 –
40	Mary Wooldridge*	Liberal	Eastern Metropolitan	29 November 2014 – 8 December 2019 (resigned)
48	Melina Bath	National	Eastern Victoria	16 April 2015 –
49	Samantha Ratnam	Greens	Northern Metropolitan	19 October 2017 –
50	Huong Truong	Greens	Western Metropolitan	21 February 2018 – 24 November 2018
51	Catherine Cumming	Justice	Western Metropolitan	24 November 2018 – 26 November 2022 (defeated)
51	Jane Garrett*	Labor	Eastern Victoria	24 November 2018 – 2 July 2022 (died)
51	Tania Maxwell	Justice	Northern Victoria	24 November 2018 –
51	Bev McArthur	Liberal	Western Victoria	24 November 2018 –
51	Ingrid Stitt	Labor	Western Metropolitan	24 November 2018 –
51	Nina Taylor	Labor	Southern Metropolitan	24 November 2018 – 26 November 2022 (transferred to LA)
51	Sonja Terpstra	Labor	Eastern Metropolitan	24 November 2018 –
51	Kaushaliya Vaghela	Labor	Western Metropolitan	24 November 2018 – 26 November 2022 (defeated)
59	Sheena Watt	Labor	Northern Metropolitan	13 October 2020 –
60	Cathrine Burnett-Wake	Liberal	Eastern Victoria	2 December 2021 –

== Proportion of women in the Council ==
Numbers and proportions are as they were directly after the beginning of Council terms and do not take into account deaths, resignations, appointments, defections or other changes in membership.

Term	Labor			Liberal			National			Greens			Others			Total		
Term	Women	Total	%	Women	Total	%	Women	Total	%	Women	Total	%	Women	Total	%	Women	Total	%
1979–1982	1	13	7.7%	1	27	3.7%	0	4	0.0%	0	0	0.0%	0	0	0.0%	2	44	4.5%
1982–1985	4	19	21.1%	1	21	4.8%	0	4	0.0%	0	0	0.0%	0	0	0.0%	5	44	11.4%
1985–1988	6	23	26.1%	0	16	0.0%	0	5	0.0%	0	0	0.0%	0	0	0.0%	6	44	13.6%
1988–1992	5	19	26.3%	2	19	10.5%	0	6	0.0%	0	0	0.0%	0	0	0.0%	7	44	15.9%
1992–1996	3	14	21.4%	3	24	12.5%	0	6	0.0%	0	0	0.0%	0	0	0.0%	6	44	13.6%
1996–1999	3	10	30.0%	6	28	21.4%	1	6	16.7%	0	0	0.0%	0	0	0.0%	9	44	20.5%
1999–2002	8	14	57.1%	3	24	12.5%	1	6	16.7%	0	0	0.0%	0	0	0.0%	12	44	27.3%
2002–2006	11	25	44.0%	2	14	14.3%	0	5	0.0%	0	0	0.0%	0	0	0.0%	13	44	29.6%
2006–2010	5	19	26.3%	5	15	33.3%	0	2	0.0%	2	3	66.7%	0	1	0.0%	12	40	30.0%
2010–2014	5	16	31.2%	6	18	33.3%	0	3	0.0%	2	3	66.7%	0	0	0.0%	13	40	32.5%
2014–2018	5	14	35.7%	5	14	35.7%	0	2	0.0%	4	5	80.0%	2	5	40.0%	16	40	40.0%
2018–2022	10	18	55.6%	4	10	40.0%	1	1	100.0%	1	1	100.0%	3	10	30.0%	19	40	47.5%
2022–	8	15	53.3%	6	12	50.0%	2	2	100.0%	3	4	75.0%	3	7	42.9%	22	40	55.0%
