= Results of the 1979 Victorian state election (Legislative Council) =

Australian state election results

Victorian state election, 5 May 1979 Legislative Council << 1976–1982 >>
Enrolled voters	2,350,407				
Votes cast	2,191,128		Turnout	93.22	+0.03
Informal votes	77,361		Informal	3.53	+0.41
Summary of votes by party
Party	Primary votes	%	Swing	Seats won	Seats held
Labor	958,158	45.33	+2.72	8	13
Liberal	924,525	43.74	–4.56	12	27
National	124,050	5.87	–1.98	2	4
Democrats	60,392	2.86	+2.86	0	0
Democratic Labor	3,212	0.15	–0.47	0	0
Independent	43,430	2.05	+1.56	0	0
Total	2,113,767			22	44

This is a list of Legislative Council results for the Victorian 1979 state election. 22 of the 44 seats were contested.

== Results by province ==
=== Ballarat ===
1979 Victorian state election: Ballarat Province
Party	Candidate	Votes	%	±%
Liberal	Clive Bubb	43,501	52.0	−6.9
Labor	David Williams	40,198	48.0	+6.9
Total formal votes		83,699	97.5	+0.1
Informal votes		2,154	2.5	−0.1
Turnout		85,853	94.9	−0.1
Liberal hold		Swing	−6.9	

- This seat was won by Labor in a 1978 by-election, but is recorded as a Liberal party hold.

=== Bendigo ===
1979 Victorian state election: Bendigo Province
Party	Candidate	Votes	%	±%
Labor	Alan Calder	29,159	36.1	+1.7
Liberal	John Radford	26,767	33.1	−0.3
National	Stuart McDonald	18,140	22.4	−5.7
Democrats	Douglas Linford	6,778	8.4	+8.4
Total formal votes		80,844	97.5	−0.5
Informal votes		2,039	2.5	+0.5
Turnout		82,883	94.8	−0.5
Two-party-preferred result
Liberal	John Radford	44,624	55.2	−5.6
Labor	Alan Calder	36,220	44.8	+5.6
Liberal hold		Swing	−5.6	

=== Boronia ===
1979 Victorian state election: Boronia Province
Party	Candidate	Votes	%	±%
Liberal	Gracia Baylor	56,703	49.7	−7.7
Labor	Richard Coughlin	52,627	46.1	+3.5
Independent	Peter Brown	4,730	4.2	+4.2
Total formal votes		114,060	97.2	+0.1
Informal votes		3,266	2.8	−0.1
Turnout		117,326	94.2	+1.2
Two-party-preferred result
Liberal	Gracia Baylor	59,359	52.0	−5.4
Labor	Richard Coughlin	54,701	48.0	+5.4
Liberal hold		Swing	−5.4	

=== Central Highlands ===
1979 Victorian state election: Central Highlands Province
Party	Candidate	Votes	%	±%
Liberal	Fred Grimwade	47,916	55.0	+5.7
Labor	Max McDonald	39,138	45.0	+8.7
Total formal votes		87,054	97.1	−0.3
Informal votes		2,039	2.5	+0.3
Turnout		89,666	92.5	+0.4
Liberal hold		Swing	−5.7	

=== Chelsea ===
1979 Victorian state election: Chelsea Province
Party	Candidate	Votes	%	±%
Labor	Eric Kent	59,381	51.2	+2.4
Liberal	Geoffrey Connard	55,684	48.8	−2.4
Total formal votes		115,065	96.3	−0.5
Informal votes		4,369	3.7	+0.5
Turnout		119,434	93.8	+1.3
Labor gain from Liberal		Swing	+2.4	

=== Doutta Galla ===
1979 Victorian state election: Doutta Galla Province
Party	Candidate	Votes	%	±%
Labor	David White	69,342	58.5	+4.9
Liberal	Claus Salger	49,192	41.5	−4.9
Total formal votes		118,534	95.0	+0.7
Informal votes		6,246	5.0	−0.7
Turnout		124,780	94.3	+0.5
Labor hold		Swing	+4.9	

=== East Yarra ===
1979 Victorian state election: East Yarra Province
Party	Candidate	Votes	%	±%
Liberal	Bill Campbell	56,302	56.3	−8.5
Labor	Jeanne Hendy	32,679	32.7	−2.5
Democrats	Michael McBride	11,075	11.1	+11.1
Total formal votes		100,056	97.6	−0.1
Informal votes		2,483	2.4	+0.1
Turnout		102,539	91.5	−0.3
Liberal hold		Swing	N/A	

- Preferences were not distributed.

=== Geelong ===
1979 Victorian state election: Geelong Province
Party	Candidate	Votes	%	±%
Labor	Rod Mackenzie	40,564	49.0	+1.5
Liberal	Gordon Hall	39,047	47.2	−5.3
Democratic Labor	James Jordan	3,212	3.9	+3.9
Total formal votes		82,823	97.0	+0.1
Informal votes		2,586	3.0	−0.1
Turnout		85,409	94.2	−1.5
Two-party-preferred result
Labor	Rod Mackenzie	42,133	50.9	+3.4
Liberal	Gordon Hall	40,690	49.1	−3.4
Labor gain from Liberal		Swing	+3.4	

=== Gippsland ===
1979 Victorian state election: Gippsland Province
Party	Candidate	Votes	%	±%
Labor	Thomas Matthews	30,624	40.2	+2.0
Liberal	Dick Long	24,874	32.7	+3.1
National	John King	12,678	16.7	−8.8
Democrats	Ian Goldie	6,232	8.2	+8.2
Independent	Bruce Ingle	1,718	2.3	+2.3
Total formal votes		76,126	95.9	−1.9
Informal votes		3,280	4.1	+1.9
Turnout		79,406	93.5	+0.2
Two-party-preferred result
Liberal	Dick Long	41,788	54.9	−2.5
Labor	Thomas Matthews	34,338	45.1	+2.5
Liberal hold		Swing	−2.5	

=== Higinbotham ===
1979 Victorian state election: Higinbotham Province
Party	Candidate	Votes	%	±%
Liberal	Robert Lawson	55,703	54.7	−7.3
Labor	Geoffrey Fleming	46,031	45.3	+7.3
Total formal votes		101,734	97.2	−0.4
Informal votes		2,961	2.8	+0.4
Turnout		104,695	93.4	+0.5
Liberal hold		Swing	−7.3	

=== Melbourne ===
1979 Victorian state election: Melbourne Province
Party	Candidate	Votes	%	±%
Labor	Evan Walker	56,565	62.5	+4.7
Liberal	Bill Stanley	33,917	37.5	−4.7
Total formal votes		90,482	94.8	−0.4
Informal votes		4,946	5.2	+0.4
Turnout		95,428	87.4	+1.6
Labor hold		Swing	+4.7	

=== Melbourne North ===
1979 Victorian state election: Melbourne North Province
Party	Candidate	Votes	%	±%
Labor	Giovanni Sgro	52,787	53.1	−10.5
Liberal	Geoff Lutz	26,222	26.4	−11.1
Independent	Eric Granger	20,496	20.6	+20.6
Total formal votes		99,955	94.7	−0.4
Informal votes		5,555	5.3	+0.4
Turnout		105,060	91.2	−0.4
Labor hold		Swing	N/A	

- Preferences were not distributed.

=== Melbourne West ===
1979 Victorian state election: Melbourne West Province
Party	Candidate	Votes	%	±%
Labor	Joan Coxsedge	54,263	52.8	−7.1
Liberal	Rino Baggio	29,842	29.0	−11.2
Independent	Alexander Knight	13,202	12.9	+12.9
Democrats	Ivan Pollock	5,466	5.3	+5.3
Total formal votes		102,773	94.7	−0.2
Informal votes		5,716	5.3	+0.2
Turnout		108,489	93.6	+1.4
Labor hold		Swing	N/A	

- Preferences were not distributed.

=== Monash ===
1979 Victorian state election: Monash Province
Party	Candidate	Votes	%	±%
Liberal	Don Hayward	57,361	59.6	−5.1
Labor	Howard Smith	38,798	40.4	+5.1
Total formal votes		96,159	96.9	0.0
Informal votes		3,112	3.1	0.0
Turnout		99,271	90.6	+0.7
Liberal hold		Swing	−5.1	

=== North Eastern ===
1979 Victorian state election: North Eastern Province
Party	Candidate	Votes	%	±%
National	Bill Baxter	33,686	40.8	−12.7
Liberal	Bill Hunter	24,157	29.3	+6.8
Labor	Nicholas Paola	20,090	24.3	+0.3
Democrats	Diane Teasdale	4,594	5.6	+5.6
Total formal votes		82,527	96.2	−1.1
Informal votes		3,218	3.8	+1.1
Turnout		85,745	94.5	+0.1
Two-candidate-preferred result
National	Bill Baxter	53,334	64.6	
Liberal	Bill Hunter	29,193	35.4	
National hold		Swing		

=== North Western ===
1979 Victorian state election: North Western Province
Party	Candidate	Votes	%	±%
National	Ken Wright	34,310	45.7	−5.5
Liberal	Ian Milburn	22,768	30.3	+0.4
Labor	Pamela Fowler	18,019	24.0	+5.1
Total formal votes		75,097	97.2	−0.5
Informal votes		2,193	2.8	+0.5
Turnout		77,290	95.2	+0.9
Two-candidate-preferred result
National	Ken Wright	47,267	62.9	−3.4
Liberal	Ian Milburn	27,830	37.1	+3.4
National hold		Swing	−3.4	

=== Nunawading ===
1979 Victorian state election: Nunawading Province
Party	Candidate	Votes	%	±%
Liberal	Peter Block	55,983	49.8	−10.4
Labor	Alan Wearne	43,709	38.9	−0.9
Democrats	Jeffrey McAlpine	12,644	11.3	+11.3
Total formal votes		112,336	97.6	0.0
Informal votes		2,706	2.4	0.0
Turnout		115,042	94.0	+0.4
Two-party-preferred result
Liberal	Peter Block	62,697	55.8	−4.4
Labor	Alan Wearne	49,639	44.2	+4.4
Liberal hold		Swing	−4.4	

=== South Eastern ===
1979 Victorian state election: South Eastern Province
Party	Candidate	Votes	%	±%
Liberal	Alan Hunt	40,278	46.1	+0.5
Labor	Norman Spencer	29,065	33.3	+4.3
National	Donald McRae	13,110	15.0	−4.6
Democrats	Stefan Taficsuk	4,790	5.5	+5.5
Total formal votes		87,243	97.5	−0.5
Informal votes		2,275	2.5	+0.5
Turnout		89,518	92.8	+0.2
Two-party-preferred result
Liberal	Alan Hunt	53,662	61.5	−4.9
Labor	Norman Spencer	33,581	38.5	+4.9
Liberal hold		Swing	−4.9	

=== Templestowe ===
1979 Victorian state election: Templestowe Province
Party	Candidate	Votes	%	±%
Liberal	Vasey Houghton	56,059	50.5	−7.3
Labor	Mike Arnold	54,881	49.5	+7.3
Total formal votes		110,940	97.4	−0.2
Informal votes		2,934	2.6	+0.2
Turnout		113,874	93.5	+0.5
Liberal hold		Swing	−7.3	

=== Thomastown ===
1979 Victorian state election: Thomastown Province
Party	Candidate	Votes	%	±%
Labor	Glyde Butler	75,172	68.4	+7.2
Liberal	Kathleen Mulraney	34,678	31.6	−7.2
Total formal votes		109,850	94.5	−1.0
Informal votes		6,395	5.5	+1.0
Turnout		116,245	93.8	+0.5
Labor hold		Swing	+7.2	

=== Waverley ===
1979 Victorian state election: Waverley Province
Party	Candidate	Votes	%	±%
Labor	Cyril Kennedy	49,097	44.8	+2.0
Liberal	William McDonald	48,309	44.1	−13.1
Democrats	Frederick Steinicke	8,813	8.1	+8.1
Independent	Stephen Buttery	3,284	3.0	+3.0
Total formal votes		109,503	95.9	−0.6
Informal votes		4,675	4.1	+0.6
Turnout		114,178	93.5	+0.2
Two-party-preferred result
Labor	Cyril Kennedy	55,376	50.6	+6.3
Liberal	William McDonald	54,127	49.4	−6.3
Labor gain from Liberal		Swing	+6.3	

=== Western ===
1979 Victorian state election: Western Province
Party	Candidate	Votes	%	±%
Liberal	Digby Crozier	39,262	50.8	+3.4
Labor	Henry Birrell	25,969	33.6	+4.0
National	Clive Mitchell	12,126	15.7	−7.3
Total formal votes		77,357	97.9	−0.5
Informal votes		1,640	2.1	+0.5
Turnout		78,997	95.2	0.0
Liberal hold		Swing	N/A	

- Preferences were not distributed.

== See also ==
- 1979 Victorian state election
- Members of the Victorian Legislative Council, 1979–1982
