= Results of the 1982 Victorian state election (Legislative Council) =

Australian state election results

Victorian state election, 3 April 1982 Legislative Council << 1979–1985 >>
Enrolled voters	2,453,642				
Votes cast	2,302,973		Turnout	93.86	+0.64
Informal votes	72,167		Informal	3.13	–0.40
Summary of votes by party
Party	Primary votes	%	Swing	Seats won	Seats held
Labor	1,105,650	49.56	+4.23	12	20
Liberal	874,736	39.21	–4.53	8	20
National	122,637	5.50	+0.37	2	4
Democrats	112,098	5.03	+2.17	0	0
Democratic Labor	11,780	0.53	+0.38	0	0
Independent	3,904	0.18	–1.87	0	0
Total	2,230,805			22	44

This is a list of Legislative Council results for the Victorian 1982 state election. 22 of the 44 seats were contested.

== Results by province ==
=== Ballarat ===
1982 Victorian state election: Ballarat Province
Party	Candidate	Votes	%	±%
Liberal	Rob Knowles	42,653	48.3	−3.7
Labor	Stephen Blomeley	39,352	44.6	−3.4
Democrats	June Johnson	6,319	7.2	+7.2
Total formal votes		88,234	98.0	+0.5
Informal votes		1,834	2.0	−0.5
Turnout		90,158	95.0	+0.1
Two-party-preferred result
Liberal	Rob Knowles	45,637	51.7	−0.3
Labor	Stephen Blomeley	42,687	48.3	+0.3
Liberal hold		Swing	−0.3	

=== Bendigo ===
1982 Victorian state election: Bendigo Province
Party	Candidate	Votes	%	±%
Labor	Fabian Reid	34,312	40.0	+3.9
Liberal	Bruce Reid	30,871	35.9	+2.8
National	Clarence Rodda	14,922	17.4	−5.0
Democrats	Marlene Gunn	5,788	6.7	−1.7
Total formal votes		85,893	97.9	+0.4
Informal votes		1,816	2.1	−0.4
Turnout		87,709	95.2	+0.4
Two-party-preferred result
Liberal	Bruce Reid	46,487	54.1	−1.1
Labor	Fabian Reid	39,406	45.9	+1.1
Liberal hold		Swing	−1.1	

=== Boronia ===
1982 Victorian state election: Boronia Province
Party	Candidate	Votes	%	±%
Labor	Judith Dixon	61,642	48.2	+2.1
Liberal	Kevin Foley	51,024	39.9	−9.8
Democrats	David Barter	12,180	9.5	+9.5
Democratic Labor	Shane McCarthy	3,133	2.4	+2.4
Total formal votes		127,979	97.8	+0.6
Informal votes		2,870	2.2	−0.6
Two-party-preferred result
Labor	Judith Dixon	69,694	54.5	+6.5
Liberal	Kevin Foley	58,285	45.5	−6.5
Labor gain from Liberal		Swing	+6.5	

=== Central Highlands ===
1982 Victorian state election: Central Highlands Province
Party	Candidate	Votes	%	±%
Labor	Anthony Marshall	43,119	44.2	−0.8
Liberal	Jock Granter	42,521	43.6	−11.4
National	Brian Trewin	6,162	6.3	+6.3
Democrats	David Johnston	5,771	5.9	+5.9
Total formal votes		97,573	97.6	+0.5
Informal votes		2,429	2.4	−0.5
Turnout		100,002	93.2	+0.7
Two-party-preferred result
Liberal	Jock Granter	49,655	50.9	−4.1
Labor	Anthony Marshall	47,918	49.1	+4.1
Liberal hold		Swing	−4.1	

=== Chelsea ===
1982 Victorian state election: Chelsea Province
Party	Candidate	Votes	%	±%
Labor	Mal Sandon	72,115	58.0	+6.4
Liberal	Neil Stacey	52,125	42.0	−6.4
Total formal votes		124,240	96.4	+0.1
Informal votes		4,686	3.6	−0.1
Turnout		128,926	93.8	0.0
Labor gain from Liberal		Swing	+6.4	

=== Doutta Galla ===
1982 Victorian state election: Doutta Galla Province
Party	Candidate	Votes	%	±%
Labor	Bill Landeryou	86,361	66.0	+7.5
Liberal	Pamela Philpot	44,518	34.0	−7.5
Total formal votes		130,879	95.1	+0.1
Informal votes		6,705	4.9	−0.1
Turnout		137,584	94.9	+0.6
Labor hold		Swing	+7.5	

=== East Yarra ===
1982 Victorian state election: East Yarra Province
Party	Candidate	Votes	%	±%
Liberal	Haddon Storey	52,671	53.7	−2.6
Labor	Doug Walpole	35,442	36.1	+3.4
Democrats	Keith Bruckner	9,985	10.2	−0.9
Total formal votes		98,098	97.8	+0.2
Informal votes		2,165	2.2	−0.2
Turnout		100,263	92.7	+1.2
Two-party-preferred result
Liberal	Haddon Storey		57.9	−4.5
Labor	Doug Walpole		42.1	+4.5
Liberal hold		Swing	−4.5	

- Two party preferred vote was estimated.

=== Geelong ===
1982 Victorian state election: Geelong Province
Party	Candidate	Votes	%	±%
Labor	David Henshaw	48,457	55.7	+6.7
Liberal	Glyn Jenkins	35,872	41.2	−5.9
Democratic Labor	Michael O'Keefe	2,711	3.1	−0.8
Total formal votes		87,040	97.2	+0.2
Informal votes		2,458	2.8	−0.2
Turnout		89,498	94.5	+0.3
Two-party-preferred result
Labor	David Henshaw		56.5	+5.6
Liberal	Glyn Jenkins		43.5	−5.6
Labor gain from Liberal		Swing	+5.6	

- Two party preferred vote was estimated.

=== Gippsland ===
1982 Victorian state election: Gippsland Province
Party	Candidate	Votes	%	±%
Labor	Barry Murphy	35,235	42.9	+2.7
Liberal	James Taylor	23,723	28.9	−2.8
National	John Vinall	16,053	19.6	+3.0
Democrats	James Gilbert	4,960	6.0	−2.2
Independent	Bruce Ingle	2,118	2.6	+0.3
Total formal votes		82,089	96.9	+1.0
Informal votes		2,591	3.1	−1.0
Turnout		84,680	93.8	+0.3
Two-party-preferred result
Labor	Barry Murphy	41,109	50.1	+5.0
Liberal	James Taylor	40,980	49.9	−5.0
Labor gain from Liberal		Swing	+5.0	

=== Higinbotham ===
1982 Victorian state election: Higinbotham Province
Party	Candidate	Votes	%	±%
Liberal	Geoffrey Connard	49,967	49.2	−5.5
Labor	Geoffrey Fleming	43,674	43.0	−2.3
Democrats	Barry Preston	7,821	7.7	+7.7
Total formal votes		101,462	97.6	+0.4
Informal votes		2,454	2.4	−0.4
Turnout		103,916	94.5	+1.1
Two-party-preferred result
Liberal	Geoffrey Connard	53,012	52.3	−2.4
Labor	Geoffrey Fleming	48,450	47.7	+2.4
Liberal hold		Swing	−2.4	

=== Melbourne ===
1982 Victorian state election: Melbourne Province
Party	Candidate	Votes	%	±%
Labor	Barry Pullen	55,348	61.2	−1.3
Liberal	Craig Baxter	27,935	30.9	−6.6
Democrats	Stephen Duthy	7,175	7.9	+7.9
Total formal votes		90,458	95.5	+0.7
Informal votes		4,245	4.5	−0.7
Turnout		94,703	89.0	+1.6
Two-party-preferred result
Labor	Barry Pullen		65.9	+3.4
Liberal	Craig Baxter		34.1	−3.4
Labor hold		Swing	+3.4	

- Two party preferred vote was estimated.

=== Melbourne North ===
1982 Victorian state election: Melbourne North Province
Party	Candidate	Votes	%	±%
Labor	Caroline Hogg	74,100	73.9	+20.8
Liberal	Geoffrey Lutz	26,229	26.1	−0.2
Total formal votes		100,329	94.7	0.0
Informal votes		5,578	5.3	0.0
Turnout		105,907	92.3	+1.1
Labor hold		Swing	+5.3	

=== Melbourne West ===
1982 Victorian state election: Melbourne West Province
Party	Candidate	Votes	%	±%
Labor	Joan Kirner	71,793	66.5	+13.7
Liberal	Matthew Matich	25,210	23.4	−5.6
Democrats	Darryl Carlton	8,607	8.0	+2.7
Democratic Labor	Margaret Reed	2,302	2.1	+2.1
Total formal votes		107,912	94.7	0.0
Informal votes		6,026	5.3	0.0
Turnout		113,938	93.9	+1.7
Two-party-preferred result
Labor	Joan Kirner		71.7	+6.8
Liberal	Matthew Matich		28.3	−6.8
Labor hold		Swing	+6.8	

- Two party preferred vote was estimated.

=== Monash ===
1982 Victorian state election: Monash Province
Party	Candidate	Votes	%	±%
Liberal	James Guest	49,420	51.9	−7.7
Labor	Peter Bergin	38,151	40.1	−0.3
Democrats	Theresa Cunningham	7,585	8.0	+8.0
Total formal votes		95,156	97.4	+0.5
Informal votes		2,527	2.6	−0.5
Turnout		97,683	92.1	+1.5
Two-party-preferred result
Liberal	James Guest		55.2	−4.4
Labor	Peter Bergin		44.8	+4.4
Liberal hold		Swing	−4.4	

- Two party preferred vote was estimated.

=== North Eastern ===
1982 Victorian state election: North Eastern Province
Party	Candidate	Votes	%	±%
National	David Evans	37,096	42.0	+1.2
Labor	Nicola Paola	26,280	29.8	+5.5
Liberal	Robert Crosby	23,116	26.2	−3.1
Independent	Brian Lumsden	1,786	2.0	+2.0
Total formal votes		88,278	97.5	+1.3
Informal votes		2,291	2.5	−1.3
Turnout		90,569	94.1	−0.4
Two-party-preferred result
National	David Evans	59,871	67.8	+3.2
Labor	Nicola Paola	28,407	32.2	+32.2
National hold		Swing	N/A	

=== North Western ===
1982 Victorian state election: North Western Province
Party	Candidate	Votes	%	±%
National	Bernie Dunn	38,371	49.9	+4.2
Labor	John Anderson	20,051	26.1	+2.1
Liberal	Ian Milburn	18,420	24.0	−6.3
Total formal votes		76,842	97.4	+0.2
Informal votes		2,010	2.6	−0.2
Turnout		78,852	94.6	−0.6
Two-party-preferred result
National	Bernie Dunn	55,984	72.9	+10.0
Labor	John Anderson	20,858	27.1	+27.1
National hold		Swing	N/A	

=== Nunawading ===
1982 Victorian state election: Nunawading Province
Party	Candidate	Votes	%	±%
Liberal	Vernon Hauser	53,096	45.7	−4.1
Labor	Laurie McArthur	51,895	44.7	+5.8
Democrats	Jeffrey McAlpine	11,179	9.6	−1.7
Total formal votes		116,170	97.9	+0.3
Informal votes		2,506	2.1	−0.3
Turnout		118,676	94.9	+0.9
Two-party-preferred result
Labor	Laurie McArthur	58,461	50.3	+6.1
Liberal	Vernon Hauser	57,709	49.7	−6.1
Labor gain from Liberal		Swing	+6.1	

=== South Eastern ===
1982 Victorian state election: South Eastern Province
Party	Candidate	Votes	%	±%
Liberal	Roy Ward	43,307	44.1	−2.1
Labor	Bora Eric	38,254	39.2	+5.9
National	Leslie Handley	10,033	10.3	−4.7
Democrats	Harold Fraser	5,913	6.1	+0.6
Total formal votes		97,507	97.7	+0.2
Informal votes		2,283	2.3	−0.2
Turnout		99,790	93.5	+0.7
Two-party-preferred result
Liberal	Roy Ward	53,932	55.3	−6.2
Labor	Bora Eric	43,575	44.7	+6.2
Liberal hold		Swing	−6.2	

=== Templestowe ===
1982 Victorian state election: Templestowe Province
Party	Candidate	Votes	%	±%
Labor	Mike Arnold	57,302	48.1	−1.4
Liberal	Ralph Howard	51,098	42.9	−7.6
Democrats	Geoffrey Loftus-Hills	10,701	9.0	+9.0
Total formal votes		119,901	97.7	+0.3
Informal votes		2,818	2.3	−0.3
Turnout		121,919	93.8	+0.3
Two-party-preferred result
Labor	Mike Arnold	62,946	52.9	+3.4
Liberal	Ralph Howard	56,155	47.1	−3.4
Labor gain from Liberal		Swing	+3.4	

=== Thomastown ===
1982 Victorian state election: Thomastown Province
Party	Candidate	Votes	%	±%
Labor	Jim Kennan	86,102	72.1	+3.7
Liberal	Rae Kennett	33,361	27.9	−3.7
Total formal votes		119,463	94.8	+0.3
Informal votes		6,488	5.2	−0.3
Turnout		125,951	94.7	+0.9
Labor hold		Swing	+3.7	

=== Waverley ===
1982 Victorian state election: Waverley Province
Party	Candidate	Votes	%	±%
Labor	Tony Van Vliet	57,047	48.9	+4.1
Liberal	Brian Joyce	47,938	41.2	−2.9
Democrats	Kenneth Mylius	8,114	6.9	−1.1
Democratic Labor	E.J. Woods	3,634	3.1	+3.1
Total formal votes		116,733	96.8	+0.9
Informal votes		3,843	3.2	−0.9
Turnout		120,576	94.7	+1.2
Two-party-preferred result
Labor	Tony Van Vliet	62,982	54.0	+3.4
Liberal	Brian Joyce	53,751	46.0	−3.4
Labor gain from Liberal		Swing	+3.4	

=== Western ===
1982 Victorian state election: Western Province
Party	Candidate	Votes	%	±%
Liberal	Bruce Chamberlain	49,661	62.6	+11.9
Labor	Allan Sargent	29,618	37.4	+3.8
Total formal votes		79,279	98.1	+0.2
Informal votes		1,545	1.9	−0.2
Turnout		80,824	95.2	0.0
Liberal hold		Swing	−1.4	

== See also ==
- 1982 Victorian state election
- Members of the Victorian Legislative Council, 1982–1985
