= Members of the Victorian Legislative Council, 1976–1979 =

- ←1973–1976 1979–1982→

This is a list of members of the Victorian Legislative Council between 1976 and 1979. As half of the Legislative Council's terms expired at each triennial election, half of these members were elected at the 1973 state election with terms expiring in 1979, while the other half were elected at the 1976 state election with terms expiring in 1982.

The 1975 redistribution, which created four new seats in Greater Melbourne and abolished one (Northern Province) in the country, came into effect during the term.

Name	Party	Province	Term expires	Term of office
Bill Baxter^{[2]}	National	North Eastern	1979	1978–1984; 1985–2006
Peter Block	Liberal	Boronia	1979	1973–1985
Keith Bradbury^{[2]}	National	North Eastern	1979	1953–1978
Bill Campbell	Liberal	East Yarra	1979	1964–1983
Bruce Chamberlain	Liberal	Western	1982	1976–2002
Digby Crozier	Liberal	Western	1979	1973–1985
Hon Vance Dickie^{[3]}	Liberal	Ballarat	1979	1956–1978
Bernie Dunn	National	North Western	1982	1969–1988
Dolph Eddy	Labor	Thomastown	1982	1970–1982
Doug Elliot	Labor	Melbourne	1979	1960–1979
David Evans	National	North Eastern	1982	1976–1996
Kevin Foley	Liberal	Boronia	1982	1976–1982
Hon William Fry	Liberal	Higinbotham	1979	1967–1979
John Galbally	Labor	Melbourne North	1979	1949–1979
Stan Gleeson	Liberal	South Western	1979	1965–1979
Jock Granter	Liberal	Central Highlands	1982	1964–1988
Fred Grimwade	Liberal	Bendigo	1979	1967–1987
James Guest	Liberal	Monash	1982	1976–1996
Vernon Hauser	Liberal	Nunawading	1982	1970–1982
Murray Hamilton	Liberal	Higinbotham	1982	1967–1982
Charles Hider	Liberal	Monash	1979	1970–1979
Hon Vasey Houghton	Liberal	Templestowe	1979	1967–1985
Ralph Howard	Liberal	Templestowe	1982	1976–1982
Hon Alan Hunt	Liberal	South Eastern	1979	1961–1992
Glyn Jenkins	Liberal	Geelong	1982	1970–1982
Alexander Knight	Labor/Independent	Melbourne West	1979	1963–1979
Rob Knowles	Liberal	Ballarat	1982	1976–1999
Bill Landeryou	Labor	Doutta Galla	1982	1976–1992
Dick Long	Liberal	Gippsland	1979	1973–1992
Stuart McDonald	National	Northern	1979	1967–1979
Bruce Reid	Liberal	Bendigo	1982	1976–1988
Don Saltmarsh	Liberal	Waverley	1982	1976–1982
Neil Stacey	Liberal	Chelsea	1982	1976–1982
Haddon Storey	Liberal	East Yarra	1982	1971–1996
James Taylor	Liberal	Gippsland	1982	1976–1982
Bon Thomas	Labor	Melbourne West	1982	1970–1982
Ivan Trayling	Labor	Melbourne	1982	1972–1982
John Tripovich^{[1]}	Labor	Doutta Galla	1979	1960–1976
John Walton	Labor	Melbourne North	1982	1958–1982
Roy Ward	Liberal	South Eastern	1982	1970–1988
David White^{[1]}	Labor	Doutta Galla	1979	1976–1996
David Williams^{[3]}	Labor	Ballarat	1979	1978–1979
Ken Wright	National	North Western	1979	1973–1992

^{1} On 6 August 1976, John Tripovich, Labor MLC for Doutta Galla, died. Labor candidate David White won the resulting by-election on 16 October 1976.
^{2} In April 1978, Keith Bradbury, National (Country) MLC for North Eastern, resigned. National candidate Bill Baxter won the resulting by-election on 24 June 1978.
^{3} In August 1978, Vance Dickie, Liberal MLC for Ballarat, resigned. Labor candidate David Williams won the resulting by-election on 28 October 1978.

== Sources ==
- "Find a Member". State Government of Victoria.
