= Electoral results for the Koonung Province =

Victoria, Australia, district election results

This is a list of electoral results for the Koonung Province in Victorian state elections.

== Members for Koonung Province ==
Member 1	Party	Year		
Bruce Atkinson	Liberal	1992	Member 2	Party
Bruce Atkinson	Liberal	1996	Gerald Ashman	Liberal
Bruce Atkinson	Liberal	1999	Gerald Ashman	Liberal
Bruce Atkinson	Liberal	2002	Helen Buckingham	Labor

== Election results ==
=== Elections in the 2000s ===
2002 Victorian state election: Koonung Province
Party	Candidate	Votes	%	±%
Labor	Helen Buckingham	64,757	47.2	+9.7
Liberal	Gerald Ashman	58,338	42.5	−11.4
Greens	Mick Kir	12,598	9.2	+6.2
Hope	Jenny Manassa	1,583	1.2	+1.2
Total formal votes		137,276	96.9	−0.4
Informal votes		4,421	3.1	+0.4
Turnout		141,697	94.2	
Two-party-preferred result
Labor	Helen Buckingham	74,853	54.5	+11.7
Liberal	Gerald Ashman	62,423	45.5	−11.7
Labor gain from Liberal		Swing	+11.7	

=== Elections in the 1990s ===
1999 Victorian state election: Koonung Province
Party	Candidate	Votes	%	±%
Liberal	Bruce Atkinson	71,158	53.3	−3.2
Labor	Kelvin Legg	51,052	38.2	+2.7
Democrats	Simone Alesich	6,908	5.2	−0.4
Total formal votes		133,598	97.2	−0.7
Informal votes		3,915	2.8	+0.7
Turnout		137,513	93.7	
Two-party-preferred result
Liberal	Bruce Atkinson	75,248	56.4	−3.2
Labor	Kelvin Legg	58,137	43.6	+3.2
Liberal hold		Swing	−3.2	

1996 Victorian state election: Koonung Province
Party	Candidate	Votes	%	±%
Liberal	Gerald Ashman	72,025	56.5	−1.4
Labor	Chrys Abraham	45,323	35.5	−1.3
Democrats	Damian Wise	7,066	5.5	+5.5
Democratic Labor	Paul Cahill	1,810	1.4	−3.9
Independent	Jill Bannan	1,336	1.0	+1.0
Total formal votes		127,560	97.8	+1.6
Informal votes		2,865	2.2	−1.6
Turnout		130,425	94.3	
Two-party-preferred result
Liberal	Gerald Ashman	75,800	59.6	−0.3
Labor	Chrys Abraham	51,431	40.4	+0.3
Liberal hold		Swing	−0.3	

1992 Victorian state election: Koonung Province
Party	Candidate	Votes	%	±%
Liberal	Bruce Atkinson	69,900	57.8	+7.4
Labor	Sharon Ellis	44,525	36.8	−12.8
Democratic Labor	Peter Ferwerda	6,429	5.3	+5.3
Total formal votes		120,854	96.2	0.0
Informal votes		4,830	3.8	0.0
Turnout		125,684	95.7	
Two-party-preferred result
Liberal	Bruce Atkinson	72,374	59.9	+9.5
Labor	Sharon Ellis	48,361	40.1	−9.5
Liberal gain from Labor		Swing	+9.5	
