= 1982 Victorian state election =

Australian state election

1982 Victoria state election
- 3 April 1982

All 81 seats in the Victorian Legislative Assembly and 22 (of the 44) seats in the Victorian Legislative Council 41 seats needed for a majority
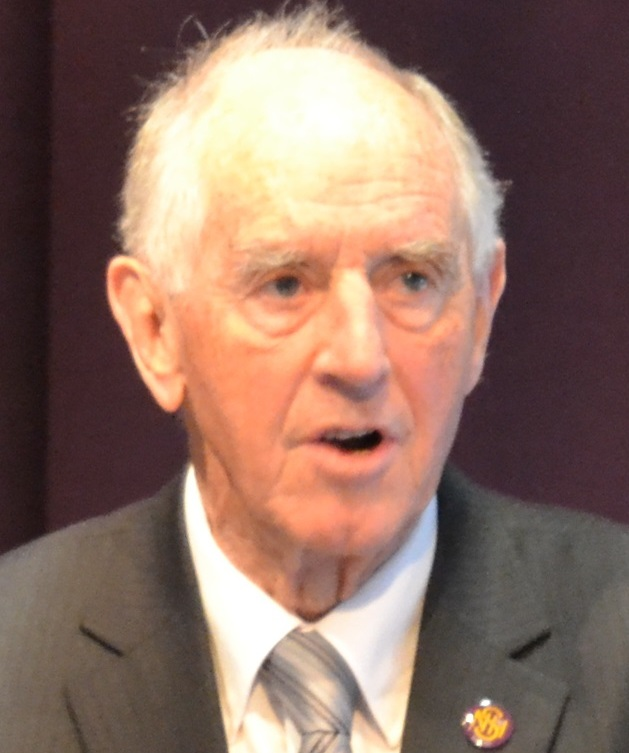

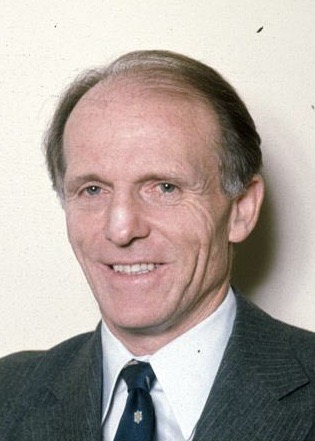

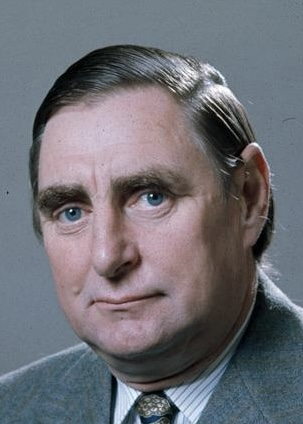
	First party	Second party	Third party
Leader	John Cain Jr.	Lindsay Thompson	Peter Ross-Edwards
Party	Labor	Liberal	National
Leader since	9 September 1981	5 June 1981	17 June 1970
Leader's seat	Bundoora	Malvern	Shepparton
Last election	32	41	8
Seats won	49	24	8
Seat change	▲17	▼17	0
Popular vote	1,122,887	860,669	111,579
Percentage	50.01%	38.33%	4.97%
Swing	▲4.77	▼3.11	▼0.64
TPP	53.78%	46.22%
TPP swing	▲4.25	▼4.25
- Results in each electorate.
Premier before election
Lindsay Thompson
Liberal
Elected Premier
John Cain Jr.
Labor

The 1982 Victoria state election was held on Saturday, 3 April 1982, for the 49th Parliament of Victoria to elect 81 members of the state's Legislative Assembly and 22 members of the 44-member Legislative Council.

Lindsay Thompson succeeded Rupert Hamer as Liberal Party leader and Premier on 5 June 1981, and John Cain Jr. replaced Frank Wilkes as Labor Party leader in September 1981. The incumbent Liberal government led by Lindsay Thompson was defeated by the Labor Party led by John Cain with a swing of 17 seats.

The ALP returned to government in Victoria for the first time in 27 years (1955).

== Results ==
=== Legislative Assembly ===
Party	Votes	%	+/–	Seats	+/–
Labor	1,122,887	50.01	▲4.77	49	▲17
Liberal	860,669	38.33	▼3.11	24	▼17
Democrats	119,083	5.30	▲0.10	0	Steady
National	111,579	4.97	▼0.64	8	Steady
Democratic Labour	7,635	0.34	▼0.17	0	Steady
Independents	23,648	1.05	▼0.37	0	Steady
Total	2,245,501	100.00	–	81	–
Valid votes	2,245,501	97.39			
Invalid/blank votes	60,272	2.61	▼0.40		
Total votes	2,305,773	100.00	–		
Registered voters/turnout	2,453,642	93.97	▼0.67		
Two-party-preferred
Labor	1,207,197	53.78	▲4.25		
Liberal	1,037,506	46.22	▼4.25		
Total	2,244,703	100.00	–		

=== Legislative Council ===
Victorian state election, 3 April 1982 Legislative Council << 1979–1985 >>
Enrolled voters	2,453,642				
Votes cast	2,302,973		Turnout	93.86	+0.64
Informal votes	72,167		Informal	3.13	–0.40
Summary of votes by party
Party	Primary votes	%	Swing	Seats won	Seats held
Labor	1,105,650	49.56	+4.23	12	20
Liberal	874,736	39.21	–4.53	8	20
National	122,637	5.50	+0.37	2	4
Democrats	112,098	5.03	+2.17	0	0
Democratic Labour	11,780	0.53	+0.38	0	0
Independent	3,904	0.18	–1.87	0	0
Total	2,230,805			22	44

== Seats changing hands ==
Seat	Pre-1982			Swing	Post-1982		
Seat	Party	Member	Margin	Swing	Margin	Member	Party
Ballarat South	Liberal	Joan Chambers	0.4	-2.3	1.9	Frank Sheehan	Labor
Bendigo	Liberal	Daryl McClure	1.2	-6.1	4.9	David Kennedy	Labor
Bennettswood	Liberal	Keith McCance	6.1	-6.5	0.4	Doug Newton	Labor
Box Hill	Liberal	Donald Mackinnon	3.6	-7.1	3.5	Margaret Ray	Labor
Dromana	Liberal	Ron Wells	6.7	-7.7	1.0	David Hassett	Labor
Evelyn	Liberal	Jim Plowman	3.8	-8.1	4.3	Max McDonald	Labor
Frankston	Liberal	Graeme Weideman	7.2	-7.3	0.1	Jane Hill	Labor
Geelong West	Liberal	Hayden Birrell	0.8	-3.7	2.9	Hayden Shell	Labor
Ivanhoe	Liberal	Bruce Skeggs	3.4	-3.9	0.5	Tony Sheehan	Labor
Mitcham	Liberal	George Cox	0.7	-4.6	3.9	John Harrowfield	Labor
Monbulk	Liberal	Bill Borthwick	2.2	-5.2	3.0	Neil Pope	Labor
Noble Park	Liberal	Peter Collins	1.0	-7.1	6.1	Terry Norris	Labor
Ringwood	Liberal	Peter McArthur	4.1	-6.2	2.1	Kay Setches	Labor
St Kilda	Liberal	Brian Dixon	0.2	-4.3	4.1	Andrew McCutcheon	Labor
Sandringham	Liberal	Max Crellin	1.8	-3.3	1.5	Graham Ihlein	Labor
Syndal	Liberal	Geoff Coleman	0.7	-4.5	3.8	David Gray	Labor
Warrandyte	Liberal	Norman Lacy	6.1	-8.1	2.0	Lou Hill	Labor

- Members listed in italics did not recontest their seats.

== Post-election pendulum ==
Labor seats (49)
Marginal
Frankston	Jane Hill	ALP	0.1%
Bennettswood	Doug Newton	ALP	0.4%
Ivanhoe	Tony Sheehan	ALP	0.5%
Dromana	David Hassett	ALP	1.0%
Sandringham	Graham Ihlein	ALP	1.5%
Ballarat South	Frank Sheehan	ALP	1.9%
Warrandyte	Lou Hill	ALP	2.0%
Ringwood	Kay Setches	ALP	2.1%
Geelong West	Hayden Shell	ALP	2.9%
Monbulk	Neil Pope	ALP	3.0%
Box Hill	Margaret Ray	ALP	3.5%
Prahran	Bob Miller	ALP	3.7%
Syndal	David Gray	ALP	3.8%
Mitcham	John Harrowfield	ALP	3.9%
St Kilda	Andrew McCutcheon	ALP	4.1%
Evelyn	Max McDonald	ALP	4.3%
Glenhuntly	Gerard Vaughan	ALP	4.6%
Bendigo	David Kennedy	ALP	4.9%
Bentleigh	Gordon Hockley	ALP	5.4%
Oakleigh	Race Mathews	ALP	5.9%
Fairly safe
Noble Park	Terry Norris	ALP	6.1%
Geelong East	Graham Ernst	ALP	6.3%
Springvale	Kevin King	ALP	6.9%
Greensborough	Pauline Toner	ALP	8.9%
Essendon	Barry Rowe	ALP	9.4%
Safe
Heatherton	Peter Spyker	ALP	10.3%
Knox	Steve Crabb	ALP	11.3%
Carrum	Ian Cathie	ALP	14.7%
Morwell	Valerie Callister	ALP	15.2%
Dandenong	Rob Jolly	ALP	15.3%
Albert Park	Bunna Walsh	ALP	16.3%
Bundoora	John Cain	ALP	16.6%
Niddrie	Jack Simpson	ALP	16.9%
Geelong North	Neil Trezise	ALP	18.1%
Werribee	Ken Coghill	ALP	18.9%
Melbourne	Keith Remington	ALP	19.4%
Glenroy	Jack Culpin	ALP	21.2%
Reservoir	Jim Simmonds	ALP	21.6%
Williamstown	Gordon Stirling	ALP	21.6%
Ascot Vale	Tom Edmunds	ALP	21.7%
Keilor	George Seitz	ALP	22.1%
Northcote	Frank Wilkes	ALP	23.5%
Preston	Carl Kirkwood	ALP	24.5% v DEM
Coburg	Peter Gavin	ALP	24.8%
Sunshine	Bill Fogarty	ALP	25.5%
Footscray	Robert Fordham	ALP	26.3%
Richmond	Theo Sidiropoulos	ALP	26.3%
Brunswick	Tom Roper	ALP	28.9%
Broadmeadows	John Wilton	ALP	31.9%

Liberal/National seats (32)
Marginal
Forest Hill	John Richardson	LIB	0.2%
Wantirna	Don Saltmarsh	LIB	0.8%
Gisborne	Tom Reynolds	LIB	0.9%
South Barwon	Harley Dickinson	LIB	1.1%
Berwick	Rob Maclellan	LIB	1.2%
Mentone	Bill Templeton	LIB	1.2%
Midlands	Bill Ebery	LIB	1.3%
Narracan	John Delzoppo	LIB	1.7%
Hawthorn	Walter Jona	LIB	2.6%
Westernport	Alan Brown	LIB	3.9%
Ripon	Tom Austin	LIB	4.7%
Ballarat North	Tom Evans	LIB	4.9%
Doncaster	Morris Williams	LIB	5.5%
Fairly safe
Burwood	Jeff Kennett	LIB	6.6%
Caulfield	Ted Tanner	LIB	7.0%
Gippsland South	Tom Wallace	NAT	8.6% v LIB
Portland	Don McKellar	LIB	8.8%
Safe
Kew	Prue Sibree	LIB	10.1%
Warrnambool	Ian Smith	LIB	11.3%
Balwyn	Jim Ramsay	LIB	11.4%
Brighton	Jeannette Patrick	LIB	11.9%
Benalla	Pat McNamara	NAT	13.4%
Malvern	Lindsay Thompson	LIB	13.6%
Gippsland East	Bruce Evans	NAT	14.1%
Mildura	Milton Whiting	NAT	16.7%
Benambra	Lou Lieberman	LIB	16.9%
Polwarth	Cec Burgin	LIB	16.9%
Shepparton	Peter Ross-Edwards	NAT	18.3%
Murray Valley	Ken Jasper	NAT	19.0%
Lowan	Bill McGrath	NAT	25.5%
Rodney	Eddie Hann	NAT	26.9%
Swan Hill	Alan Wood	LIB	27.0%

== See also ==
- Candidates of the 1982 Victorian state election
