= List of Australian politicians =

This article lists Australian politicians. It includes members of the Parliament of Australia and members of state and territory parliaments.

== Members of the Australian Parliament ==
For current members, see

- List of members of the Australian House of Representatives
- List of members of the Australian Senate

== Members of state and territory parliaments ==
For current members, see

- Members of the Australian Capital Territory Legislative Assembly, 2024–2028
- Members of the New South Wales Legislative Assembly, 2023–2027
- Members of the New South Wales Legislative Council, 2023–2027
- Members of the Northern Territory Legislative Assembly, 2024–2028
- Members of the Queensland Legislative Assembly, 2024–2028
- Members of the South Australian House of Assembly, 2026–2030
- Members of the South Australian Legislative Council, 2026–2030
- Members of the Tasmanian House of Assembly, 2024–2025
- Members of the Tasmanian Legislative Council, 2023–2029
- Members of the Victorian Legislative Assembly, 2022–2026
- Members of the Victorian Legislative Council, 2022–2026
- Members of the Western Australian Legislative Assembly, 2025–2029
- Members of the Western Australian Legislative Council, 2025–2029

== See also ==
- Politics of Australia
- Premiers of the Australian states
- List of Asian Australian politicians
- List of Australian actor-politicians
- List of Australian politicians of Indian origin
- List of Australian sportsperson-politicians
- List of Indigenous Australian politicians
