= 1985 Victorian state election =

Australian state election

- 2 March 1985

All 88 seats in the Victorian Legislative Assembly and 22 (of the 44) seats in the Victorian Legislative Council 45 seats needed for a majority
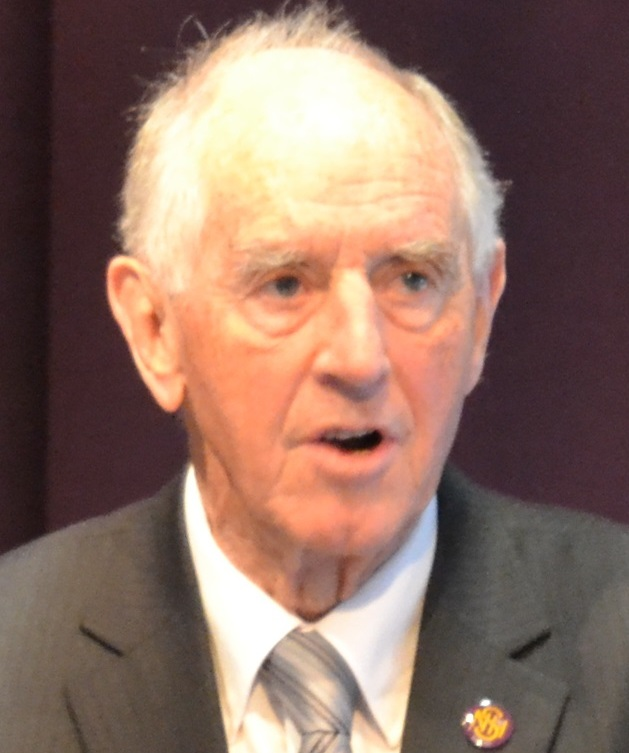

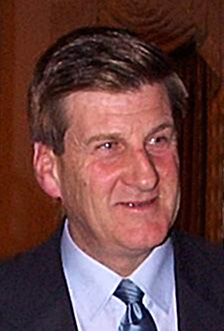

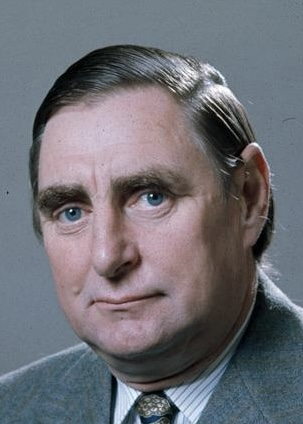
	First party	Second party	Third party
Leader	John Cain Jr.	Jeff Kennett	Peter Ross-Edwards
Party	Labor	Liberal	National
Leader since	9 September 1981	26 October 1982	17 June 1970
Leader's seat	Bundoora	Burwood	Shepparton
Last election	49	24	8
Seats won	47	31	10
Seat change	▼2	▲7	▲2
Popular vote	1,198,262	1,003,003	174,727
Percentage	50.01%	41.86%	7.29%
Swing	0.00	▲3.53	▲2.32
TPP	50.70%	49.30%
TPP swing	▼3.08	▲3.08
- Results in each electorate.
Premier before election
John Cain Jr.
Labor
Elected Premier
John Cain Jr.
Labor

The 1985 Victorian state election, held on Saturday, 2 March 1985, was for the 50th Parliament of Victoria. It was held in the Australian state of Victoria to elect all 88 members of the state's Legislative Assembly and 22 members of the 44-member Legislative Council. Since the previous election, the number of members of the Legislative Assembly was increased by seven to 88 seats in total.

Lindsay Thompson, who led the Liberal Party to a defeat at the 1982 election with a 17-seat swing against it, resigned the leadership of the party on 5 November 1982. He was succeeded by Jeff Kennett. At the election, the incumbent Labor Party government led by John Cain Jr. maintained its electoral support, though the Liberal Party did increase the number of seats. It was the first time since Federation that a Labor government had been reelected in Victoria. Although the Labor Party lost seats in the lower house it gained a majority in the upper house picking up 4 seats to hold 23 up from 19 at the last election meaning the Liberal/National Coalition no longer had sway on government policy.

== Results ==
=== Legislative Assembly ===
Party	Votes	%	+/–	Seats	+/–
Labor	1,198,262	50.01	0.00	47	▼2
Liberal	1,003,003	41.86	▲3.53	31	▲7
National	174,727	7.29	▲2.32	10	▲2
Weekend Trading	3,909	0.16	New	0	Steady
Public Transport	3,390	0.14	New	0	Steady
Independents	12,828	0.54	▼0.51	0	Steady
Total	2,396,119	100.00	–	88	–
Valid votes	2,396,119	97.32			
Invalid/blank votes	66,107	2.68	▲0.07		
Total votes	2,462,226	100.00	–		
Registered voters/turnout	2,641,477	93.21	▼0.76		
Two-party-preferred
Labor	1,214,832	50.70	▼3.08		
Liberal	1,181,287	49.30	▲3.08		
Total	2,396,119	100.00	–		

=== Legislative Council ===
Victorian state election, 2 March 1985 Legislative Council << 1982–1988 >>
Enrolled voters	2,641,477				
Votes cast	2,461,708		Turnout	93.19	–0.67
Informal votes	74,202		Informal	3.01	–0.12
Summary of votes by party
Party	Primary votes	%	Swing	Seats won	Seats held
Labor	1,128,747	47.28	–2.28	11	23
Liberal	982,418	41.15	+1.94	8	16
National	159,299	6.67	+1.17	3	5
Democrats	95,045	3.98	–1.05	0	0
Call to Australia	16,849	0.71	+0.71	0	0
Independent	5,148	0.22	+0.04	0	0
Total	2,387,506			22	44

== Seats changing hands ==
Seat	Pre-1985			Swing	Post-1985		
Seat	Party	Member	Margin	Swing	Margin	Member	Party
Bennettswood	Labor	Doug Newton	1.2	-2.0	0.8	Roger Pescott	Liberal
Dromana	Labor	David Hassett	1.4	-3.8	2.4	Ron Wells	Liberal
Evelyn	Labor	Max McDonald	1.3	-4.1	2.8	Jim Plowman	Liberal
Ivanhoe	Labor	Tony Sheehan	1.3	-2.7	1.6	Vin Heffernan	Liberal
Mornington	Labor	notional - new seat	1.4	-3.4	2.0	Robin Cooper	Liberal
Syndal	Labor	David Gray	0.1	-1.5	1.4	Geoff Coleman	Liberal
Warrnambool	Liberal	Adam Kempton	11.3	-17.8	6.5	John McGrath	National

- Members listed in italics did not recontest their seats.
- In addition, the National party retained the seat of Swan Hill, which it had won from the Liberals in a by-election.

=== Redistribution affected seats ===
Seat	1982 election			1984 redistribution			Swing	1985 election		
Seat	Party	Member	Margin	Party	Member	Margin	Swing	Margin	Member	Party
Mentone	Liberal	Bill Templeton	1.2	Labor	Notional	3.7	-1.7	2.0	Peter Spyker	Labor
Narracan	Liberal	John Delzoppo	1.7	Labor	Notional	1.4	1.8	0.4	John Delzoppo	Liberal
Prahran	Labor	Bob Miller	3.7	Liberal	Notional	1.7	5.1	6.8	Don Hayward	Liberal
Sandringham	Labor	Graham Ihlein	1.5	Liberal	Notional	2.6	2.3	4.9	David Lea	Liberal

== Post-election pendulum ==
Labor seats (47)
Marginal
Bentleigh	Gordon Hockley	ALP	0.1%
Warrandyte	Lou Hill	ALP	0.2%
Ballarat South	Frank Sheehan	ALP	1.8%
Mentone	Peter Spyker	ALP	2.0%
Box Hill	Margaret Ray	ALP	2.1%
Ringwood	Kay Setches	ALP	2.7%
St Kilda	Andrew McCutcheon	ALP	2.7%
Bellarine	Graham Ernst	ALP	3.0%
Mitcham	John Harrowfield	ALP	3.7%
Monbulk	Neil Pope	ALP	3.7%
Whittlesea	Max McDonald	ALP	4.6%
Greensborough	Pauline Toner	ALP	5.1%
Wantirna	Carolyn Hirsh	ALP	5.3%
Bendigo West	David Kennedy	ALP	5.7%
Fairly safe
Geelong	Hayden Shell	ALP	6.1%
Oakleigh	Race Mathews	ALP	6.1%
Werribee	Ken Coghill	ALP	6.2%
Springvale	Eddie Micallef	ALP	7.0%
Morwell	Valerie Callister	ALP	7.4%
Frankston North	Jane Hill	ALP	9.0%
Dandenong North	Jan Wilson	ALP	9.1%
Carrum	Ian Cathie	ALP	9.4%
Clayton	Gerard Vaughan	ALP	9.8%
Safe
Dandenong	Terry Norris	ALP	11.1%
Knox	Steve Crabb	ALP	11.4%
Pascoe Vale	Tom Edmunds	ALP	11.4%
Keilor	George Seitz	ALP	11.5%
Essendon	Barry Rowe	ALP	12.1%
Albert Park	Bunna Walsh	ALP	12.2%
Bundoora	John Cain	ALP	12.3%
Niddrie	Jack Simpson	ALP	13.0%
Doveton	Rob Jolly	ALP	14.9%
Melbourne	Keith Remington	ALP	15.2%
Derrimut	David Cunningham	ALP	15.6%
Geelong North	Neil Trezise	ALP	15.8%
Reservoir	Jim Simmonds	ALP	18.7%
Williamstown	Gordon Stirling	ALP	18.8%
Preston	Carl Kirkwood	ALP	19.6%
Broadmeadows	Jack Culpin	ALP	20.0%
Coburg	Peter Gavin	ALP	20.4%
Brunswick	Tom Roper	ALP	20.6%
St Albans	Alex Andrianopoulos	ALP	21.0%
Sunshine	Bill Fogarty	ALP	21.1%
Richmond	Theo Sidiropoulos	ALP	21.4%
Northcote	Frank Wilkes	ALP	21.8%
Footscray	Robert Fordham	ALP	23.4%
Thomastown	Beth Gleeson	ALP	23.9%

Liberal/National seats (41)
Marginal
Narracan	John Delzoppo	LIB	0.4%
Bennettswood	Roger Pescott	LIB	0.8%
Syndal	Geoff Coleman	LIB	1.4%
Ivanhoe	Vin Heffernan	LIB	1.6%
Mornington	Robin Cooper	LIB	2.0%
Dromana	Ron Wells	LIB	2.4%
Evelyn	Jim Plowman	LIB	2.8%
Berwick	Rob Maclellan	LIB	3.1%
South Barwon	Harley Dickinson	LIB	3.4%
Frankston South	Graeme Weideman	LIB	3.6%
Bendigo East	Michael John	LIB	3.9%
Forest Hill	John Richardson	LIB	3.9%
Sandringham	David Lea	LIB	4.9%
Burwood	Jeff Kennett	LIB	5.6%
Doncaster	Morris Williams	LIB	5.6%
Hawthorn	Phil Gude	LIB	5.7%
Fairly safe
Ripon	Tom Austin	LIB	6.5%
Warrnambool	John McGrath	NAT	6.5% v LIB
Prahran	Don Hayward	LIB	6.8%
Ballarat North	Tom Evans	LIB	7.1%
Caulfield	Ted Tanner	LIB	7.3%
Gisborne	Tom Reynolds	LIB	7.5%
Bulleen	David Perrin	LIB	7.8%
Malvern	Geoff Leigh	LIB	9.8%
Safe
Glen Waverley	Ross Smith	LIB	10.1%
Kew	Prue Sibree	LIB	10.2%
Brighton	Alan Stockdale	LIB	12.1%
Gippsland West	Alan Brown	LIB	12.1%
Portland	Digby Crozier	LIB	13.3%
Balwyn	Jim Ramsay	LIB	15.4%
Benalla	Pat McNamara	NAT	16.1%
Gippsland East	Bruce Evans	NAT	17.5%
Polwarth	Ian Smith	LIB	18.3%
Benambra	Lou Lieberman	LIB	19.6%
Gippsland South	Tom Wallace	NAT	21.8%
Murray Valley	Ken Jasper	NAT	22.2%
Shepparton	Peter Ross-Edwards	NAT	22.8%
Mildura	Milton Whiting	NAT	23.0%
Swan Hill	Barry Steggall	NAT	27.6%
Rodney	Eddie Hann	NAT	30.1%
Lowan	Bill McGrath	NAT	30.2%

== See also ==
- Candidates of the 1985 Victorian state election
