= Peter Collins (Victorian politician) =

Australian politician

Peter Charles Collins (born 7 October 1941) is an Australian politician. He was a Liberal Party member of the Victorian Legislative Assembly from 1976 to 1982, representing the electorate of Noble Park. He served as secretary to Cabinet from 1981 to 1982.

Collins was born in Bowness-on-Windermere in England, and he attended Tiffin Boys Grammar School in Kingston. He worked as a dry cleaning salesman, labourer, and in a plastics factory prior to migrating to Australia, and was involved in the first wave of the Ban the Bomb marches. He migrated to Australia in 1963, and worked as an encyclopedia salesman and then as a used car salesman from 1965 to 1972. He opened his own car sales business, Peter Collins Motors, in 1972, operating it until his election to parliament. He was a City of Springvale councillor from 1973 to 1979, became chairman of the Westernport Regional Council for Social Development in 1975, and became chairman of the Springvale and Noble Park sewerage authority in 1976.

Collins was elected to the Legislative Assembly at the 1976 state election, winning the new seat of Noble Park. A somewhat outspoken MP, he was a staunch opponent of massage parlors and had a strong interest in consumer affairs issues. He crossed the floor to vote with the National Party and Labor opposition in 1978 over a lack of parliamentary time set aside for discussing social welfare legislation. He was re-elected at the 1979 election. Collins had been floated as a potential minister during his second term, and when Lindsay Thompson ousted Rupert Hamer as Liberal leader and Premier in 1981, Thompson promoted Collins to cabinet secretary. In 1981, he travelled to Italy to locate any victims of the 1980 Irpinia earthquake who may have had family in Australia.

Collins faced a difficult race at the 1982 state election. He only held Noble Park by a 1% margin going into the election, and Labor had recruited Cop Shop actor Terry Norris (who left the successful TV series to enter politics) as their candidate for the seat. Norris soundly defeated Collins as the Cain Labor government came to power, and Collins did not run for office again. He worked as a consultant after leaving politics.

Parliament of Victoria
Preceded by New seat	Member for Noble Park; 1976–1982	Succeeded by Terry Norris
