= Public Transport Party =

- President: Rod Bryant
- Founded: 3 February 1985
- Dissolved: April 1985
- Ideology: Public transport advocacy

The Public Transport Party (PTP) was an Australian political party that contested the 1985 Victorian state election.

The party was formed in February 1985 as a result of protests from Labor Party rank-and-file members over the Cain government's reversal of public transport policies.

At the election, the party contested three seats in the Legislative Assembly − Knox (the seat of transport minister Steve Crabb), Melbourne and Prahran. Their best result came in Melbourne, where they won 6.9% of the vote.

== See also ==
- Transport Matters Party (2018−2023)
