= Kevin Foley (Victorian politician) =

Australian politician and academic

Kevin James Foley (born 9 August 1938) is an Australian politician and academic.

He was born at Mayfield in New South Wales to Patrick James and Hazel Marjorie Foley. He was educated at Raymond Terrace and then at East Sydney Technical College before studying at the University of New South Wales (UNSW), where he received a bachelor's and master's degree in commerce. From 1954 to 1960 he served in Singapore for the Royal Australian Air Force, subsequently serving as a flight instructor from 1962 to 1968. He was an economics lecturer at UNSW from 1966 to 1968, when he commenced his PhD at the Australian National University, completing it in 1972. He worked as a consultant for the Defence Department and from 1974 to 1975 was a senior research economist with the Australian Wool Corporation. In 1976 he was elected to the Victorian Legislative Council as a Liberal member for Boronia. He served until his defeat in 1982, after which he became chairman of the Industrial Research and Development Board. In 1988 he was appointed a foundation professor of economics at Bond University, and since 1997 he has been a professor at the Royal Melbourne Institute of Technology and at the University of Technology Sydney.

Victorian Legislative Council
Preceded by Vernon Hauser	Member for Boronia; 1976–1982; Served alongside: Peter Block; Gracia Baylor	Succeeded by Judith Dixon
