= Koonung Province =

Former electoral province of the Victorian Legislative Council, Australia

Koonung Victoria—Legislative Council
- State: Victoria
- Created: 1992
- Abolished: 2006
- Area: 134 km^{2} (51.7 sq mi)
- Demographic: Metropolitan

Koonung Province was an electorate of the Victorian Legislative Council. It existed as a two-member electorate from 1992 to 2006, with members serving alternating eight-year terms. It replaced the abolished Boronia Province. It was a safe seat for the Liberal Party for most of its history, but was won by Labor Party candidate Helen Buckingham in Labor's landslide victory at the 2002 state election. The electorate was abolished from the 2006 state election in the wake of the Bracks Labor government's reform of the Legislative Council.

It was located in the outer east of Melbourne. In 2002, when it was last contested, it covered an area of 134 km^{2} and included the suburbs of Blackburn, Boronia, Ferntree Gully, Mitcham, Nunawading, Rowville, Scoresby, Vermont and Wheelers Hill.

== Members for Koonung Province ==
Member 1	Party	Year		
Bruce Atkinson	Liberal	1992	Member 2	Party
Bruce Atkinson	Liberal	1996	Gerald Ashman	Liberal
Bruce Atkinson	Liberal	1999	Gerald Ashman	Liberal
Bruce Atkinson	Liberal	2002	Helen Buckingham	Labor

== Election results ==
2002 Victorian state election: Koonung Province
Party	Candidate	Votes	%	±%
Labor	Helen Buckingham	64,757	47.2	+9.7
Liberal	Gerald Ashman	58,338	42.5	−11.4
Greens	Mick Kir	12,598	9.2	+6.2
Hope	Jenny Manassa	1,583	1.2	+1.2
Total formal votes		137,276	96.9	−0.4
Informal votes		4,421	3.1	+0.4
Turnout		141,697	94.2	
Two-party-preferred result
Labor	Helen Buckingham	74,853	54.5	+11.7
Liberal	Gerald Ashman	62,423	45.5	−11.7
Labor gain from Liberal		Swing	+11.7	
