= Judith Dixon =

Australian politician

Judith Lorraine Dixon, née Bowins (born 28 April 1945) is a former Australian politician.

She was born in Melbourne to dairy farmer Cecil Bowins and Constance Chamberlain. She received a Bachelor of Arts from the University of Melbourne and a Diploma of Education from Monash University, spending ten years working as a schoolteacher. In 1969 she joined the Labor Party, and was involved in the peace and nuclear disarmament movements. In 1982 she was elected to the Victorian Legislative Council for Boronia Province, serving until her defeat in 1988.

Victorian Legislative Council
Preceded by Kevin Foley	Member for Boronia; 1982–1988; Served alongside: Gracia Baylor; Jean McLean	Succeeded by Gerald Ashman
