= Frank Wilkes =

Australian politician

The Honourable Frank Wilkes AM
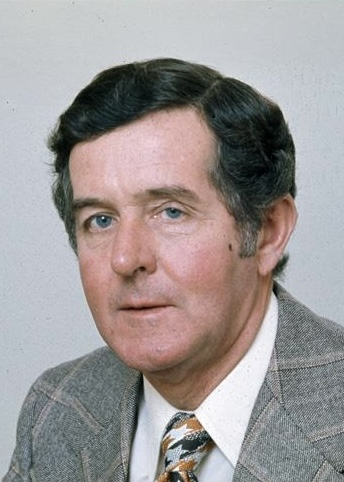
- Wilkes in 1974

Leader of the Opposition of Victoria Elections: 1979
- In office 29 June 1977 – 9 September 1981
- Premier: Rupert Hamer; Lindsay Thompson
- Deputy: Robert Fordham
- Preceded by: Clyde Holding
- Succeeded by: John Cain Jr.

Leader of the Labor Party in Victoria
- In office 29 June 1977 – 9 September 1981
- Deputy: Robert Fordham
- Preceded by: Clyde Holding
- Succeeded by: John Cain Jr.

Member of the Victorian Legislative Assembly for Northcote
- In office 21 September 1957 – 29 August 1988
- Preceded by: John Cain Sr.
- Succeeded by: Tony Sheehan

Personal details
- Born: Frank Noel Wilkes; 16 June 1922 Melbourne, Victoria, Australia
- Died: 20 August 2015 (aged 93) Melbourne, Victoria, Australia
- Party: Labor Party
- Spouse: Wilma Richards
- Children: Suzanne Jennifer Wilkes Helen Buckingham
- Education: RMIT University
- Profession: Furniture manufacturer

Military service
- Allegiance: Australia
- Branch/service: Australian Army
- Years of service: 1943–1945
- Rank: Signalman

Frank Noel Wilkes AM (16 June 1922 – 20 August 2015) was an Australian politician who served as the Leader of the Labor Opposition in Victoria from 1977 to 1981.

== Early life ==
Wilkes was born in Melbourne and educated at Northcote Primary and Secondary Schools and Preston Technical College. During the Second World War he served in the southwest Pacific in the Australian Army as a radio operator. After the war he studied accountancy, and worked in his father's furniture factory, of which he later became manager. In 1954 he was elected to Northcote City Council, which he almost completely dominated. Wilkes served as a Councillor until 1978, but he never became Mayor, as work commitments being both a councillor and a parliamentarian were too great.

== Political career ==
The state electorate of Northcote had been held since 1917 by John Cain Sr., leader of the Labor Party and three times Premier of Victoria. Wilkes became a protégé of Cain's and joined the Labor Party in 1948, despite his family background in business. He was Cain's campaign manager at the 1952 and 1955 state elections. Upon Cain's sudden death in 1957, Wilkes was elected to the Victorian Legislative Assembly at the subsequent by-election. He became Labor Whip in 1959, and Deputy Leader in 1967.

Wilkes was a loyal deputy to Clyde Holding, who led the ALP in opposition from 1967 to 1977 and lost three elections to the Liberal Party, first to Henry Bolte and then to Sir Rupert Hamer. When Holding resigned after the ALP's landslide defeat in 1976, Wilkes claimed the leadership by right of long and loyal service, rather than any outstanding ability. He was an uninspiring speaker and no match for the urbane Hamer in Parliament or on the hustings. Wilkes and Holding told diplomatic officials in 1974 of a "renovation" or "coup" they were staging within the Victorian Young Labor organisation to remove "pro-Arab" supporters.

Nevertheless, at the 1979 state election, Labor under Wilkes gained eleven seats, the party's best showing for 24 years. The ALP even won constituencies in eastern Melbourne, a region from which it had been shut out for a quarter-century. However, due to the uneven nature of the swing, Labor came up nine seats short of making Wilkes premier.

While Wilkes had brought Labor within striking distance of victory at the next election, few within the party thought that he could take the party further. John Cain Jr., son of the former Premier and a man whom most believed to be of greater ability than Wilkes, had been elected to Parliament in 1976 and by 1979 was among the leading ALP parliamentarians. During 1980 and 1981 Cain's supporters (such as Bill Landeryou) destabilized Wilkes's leadership and eventually forced his resignation.

When Cain led Labor to victory in 1982, Wilkes was made Minister for Local Government. He retired in 1988 from Parliament after more than 30 years of service. In the 1989 Queen's Birthday honours, he was made a Member of the Order of Australia for service to government and politics and to the Victorian parliament.

== Personal life ==
Wilkes' daughter Helen Buckingham was a Labor member of the Victorian Legislative Council from 2002 to 2006. Wilkes died on 20 August 2015, aged 93.

Victorian Legislative Assembly
Preceded by John Cain Sr.	Member for Northcote; 1957–1988	Succeeded by Tony Sheehan
Political offices
Preceded by Clyde Holding	Leader of the Opposition (Victoria); 1977–1981	Succeeded by John Cain Jr.
Preceded by Lou Lieberman	Minister for Local Government; 1982–1985	Succeeded by Jim Simmonds
Preceded by Ian Cathie	Minister for Housing; 1985–1987	Succeeded by Bunna Walsh
New ministerial post	Minister for Tourism; 1987–1988	Succeeded by Steve Crabb
Preceded by Andrew McCutcheon	Minister for Water Resources; 1987–1988	Succeeded by Bunna Walsh
Party political offices
Preceded by Clyde Holding	Leader of the Labor Party in Victoria; 1977–1981	Succeeded by John Cain Jr.
