= Clive Bubb =

Australian politician (1936–2004)

Clive Bubb (6 November 1936 – 11 October 2004) was an Australian politician.

Born in Geelong to textile worker Albert Bubb and Alice Richards, he attended public schools in Geelong before studying at the Gordon Institute of Technology, from which he received a Diploma of Commerce. On 28 February 1958 he married Monica Laker, with whom he had four children. An industrial relations manager, he worked for various companies in the Geelong area, and joined the local Liberal Party in 1973. In 1979 he was elected to the Victorian Legislative Council to represent Ballarat Province; he was the Opposition spokesman for industrial relations from 1982. In 1985 he resigned from the council to contest the Legislative Assembly seat of Ballarat South, but he was defeated.
