= Jean McLean (politician) =

Australian politician and activist (born 1934)

Jean McLean AM (born 3 October 1934) is an Australian activist in the causes of feminism, human rights, independence movements and for peace. She was an Australian socialist politician and served in government.

== Early life and education ==
McLean was born in London to high school principal Pauline Berezovsky and industrial scientist Arthur Marsden Crosland. She was home-schooled except for brief periods at public school.

== Career ==
=== Unionist ===
Having moved to Australia McLean joined the Labor Party in 1965, and became union director of the Prahran College of Advanced Education from 1974 to 1980.

=== Anti-conscription and Vietnam War activist ===
While living in Beaumaris and involved in the Beaumaris Art Group, McLean became concerned about conscription for the Vietnam War. She came to public notice as convenor of the Save our Sons Movement, which from 1965 to 1973 campaigned against conscription and Australia's involvement in the Vietnam War. She was also vice-chair of the Australian Vietnam Moratorium Movement.

In 1970 she became one of the 'Fairlea Five', a group of anti-conscription women who spent 14 days in Fairlea Women's Prison after being charged with trespass when they entered a building to hand out leaflets.

McLean's husband Eric was actively engaged in the People for Nuclear Disarmament movement.

=== Politician ===
A resident of Carrum, in 1973 McLean stood for the Australian Labor Party in the electorate of Monash Province, for the Victorian Legislative Council. In 1975 she joined the Federal Joint Committee on Foreign Affairs which, following the 1972 election, had broadened its scope to include defence, becoming the Joint Committee on Foreign Affairs and Defence. From 1981 to 1985 McLean was ACTU Arts Officer and was a federal conference delegate from 1976 to 1988. She has been, or conitnues as, a member of ALP Policy Committees including Aboriginal Affairs and Arts, and Media and Information, as well as Amnesty International, the Australia-Cuba Association, the Campaign for International Cooperation and Disarmament (CICD), and the Yarraville Arts and Culture Association.

In 1985 she was endorsed as the Labor candidate representing Boronia Province and when Democrat Sid Sindler's preferences were counted, they went to her and she was elected to the Victorian Legislative Council. When that seat was abolished in 1992 she moved to Melbourne West Province, which she represented until her retirement in 1999.

McLean had a prominent and sometimes controversial career as a politician and as an activist in support of a broad range of high profile public causes and expressed her opposition to identity cards. As a parliamentarian, she was particularly active on the Drugs and Crime Prevention Committee and the Law Reform Committee, which was responsible for reforming the jury system and developing witness protection. As an active member of the ALP she immersed herself in a range of international causes, including those of Namibia, West Papua and most notably East Timor. The Victorian government in 1989, through acting Premier Robert Fordham, tried to distance itself when with other members of Labor's Socialist Left faction George Crawford and Joan Coxsedge she left for Libya to meet its leader, Colonel Gaddafi.

=== East Timor ===
McLean involvement with East Timor has been extensive. She is a former chairperson and current deputy chairperson of the Australian East-Timor Association. She gave tireless support to the East Timorese resistance in their long struggle to achieve independence. She visited East Timor when it was under Indonesian occupation and subsequently leading up to and following independence. Her interventions have seen Victoria University become involved in the struggle for and independence of East Timor, and she has acted as a champion for the University's continued role in the development of Timor L'este and its people. As a Councillor of Victoria University for nine years, she has been a significant contributor to the development and advancement of the University.

== Awards ==
In recognition of her outstanding work as an activist, her extensive political career as a dedicated member of the Victorian Parliament and her significant contributions to Victoria University, in 2005 McLean was bestowed an honorary degree of Doctor of the University, honoris causa. She was later made an Honorary Fellow of the University.

In the 2019 Australian Day Honours McLean was awarded Member of the Order of Australia (AM) "for significant service to international relations, and to the Parliament of Victoria."

Victoria University established the 'Jean McLean Oration' in 2021 in recognition of the "significant contribution she has made to public life, in particular to Timor-Leste".

McLean is recognised in the Australian Living Peace Museum, The Honour Roll of Australian Conscientious Objectors, Draft Resisters and Peacemakers, and The Australians Women's Register.

In 2016 McLean received the Order of Timor-Leste from President Taur Matan Ruak.

== Personal life ==
McLean has two children and two grandchildren and continues her work as an activist.
