= Electoral district of Noble Park =

Former state electoral district of Victoria, Australia

Coordinates: 37°58′S 145°11′E

Noble Park Victoria—Legislative Assembly
- State: Victoria
- Created: 1976
- Abolished: 1985
- Namesake: Suburb of Noble Park
- Demographic: Metropolitan

The electoral district of Noble Park was an electoral district of the Legislative Assembly in the Australian state of Victoria.

== Members ==
Member	Party	Term
Peter Collins	Liberal	1976–1982
Terry Norris	Labor	1982–1985
