= 1979 Victorian state election =

Australian state election

1979 Victoria state election
- 5 May 1979

All 81 seats in the Victorian Legislative Assembly and 22 (of the 44) seats in the Victorian Legislative Council 41 seats needed for a majority
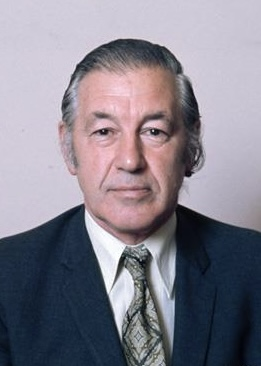

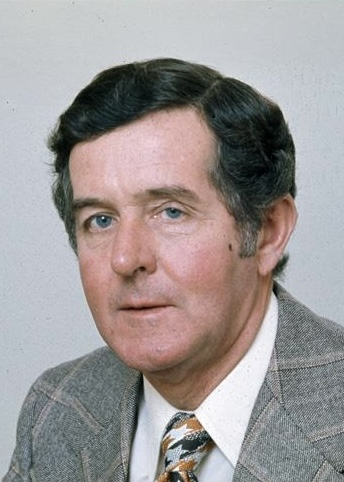

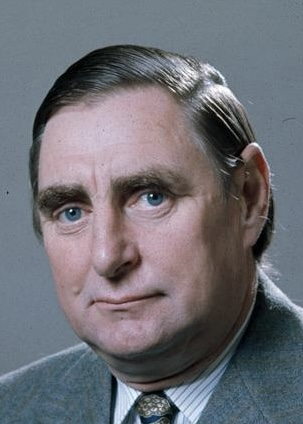
	First party	Second party	Third party
Leader	Rupert Hamer	Frank Wilkes	Peter Ross-Edwards
Party	Liberal	Labor	National
Leader since	23 August 1972	29 June 1977	17 June 1970
Leader's seat	Kew	Northcote	Shepparton
Last election	52	21	7
Seats won	41	32	8
Seat change	▼11	▲11	▲1
Popular vote	881,366	962,123	119,385
Percentage	41.44%	45.23%	5.61%
Swing	▼4.44	▲2.80	▼1.46
TPP	50.47%	49.53%
TPP swing	▼5.30	▲5.30
- Results in each electorate.
Premier before election
Rupert Hamer
Liberal
Elected Premier
Rupert Hamer
Liberal

The 1979 Victoria state election, held on Saturday, 5 May 1979, was for the 48th Parliament of Victoria. It was held in the Australian state of Victoria to elect 81 members of the state's Legislative Assembly and 22 members of the 44-member Legislative Council.

The incumbent Liberal government led by Rupert Hamer was returned with a significantly reduced majority. This was the ninth consecutive election win for the Liberals. as of 2026, no other party government has won a ninth consecutive election.

== Results ==
=== Legislative Assembly ===
Party	Votes	%	+/–	Seats	+/–
Labor	962,123	45.23	▲2.80	32	▲11
Liberal	881,366	41.44	▼4.44	41	▼11
National	119,385	5.61	▼1.46	8	▲1
Democrats	114,053	5.36	New	0	Steady
Democratic Labour	10,907	0.51	▼2.06	0	Steady
Australia	5,222	0.25	▲0.08	0	Steady
Communist	2,305	0.11	New	0	Steady
Socialist Workers	1,558	0.07	New	0	Steady
Independents	30,102	1.42	▼0.31	0	▼1
Total	2,127,021	100.00	–	81	–
Valid votes	2,127,021	96.99			
Invalid/blank votes	66,016	3.01	▲0.47		
Total votes	2,193,037	100.00	–		
Registered voters/turnout	2,350,407	93.30	▲0.62		
Two-party-preferred
Liberal	1,073,415	50.47	▼5.30		
Labor	1,053,606	49.53	▲5.30		
Total	2,127,021	100.00	–		

=== Legislative Council ===
Victorian state election, 5 May 1979 Legislative Council << 1976–1982 >>
Enrolled voters	2,350,407				
Votes cast	2,191,128		Turnout	93.22	+0.03
Informal votes	77,361		Informal	3.53	+0.41
Summary of votes by party
Party	Primary votes	%	Swing	Seats won	Seats held
Labor	958,158	45.33	+2.72	8	13
Liberal	924,525	43.74	–4.56	12	27
National	124,050	5.87	–1.98	2	4
Democrats	60,392	2.86	+2.86	0	0
Democratic Labour	3,212	0.15	–0.47	0	0
Independent	43,430	2.05	+1.56	0	0
Total	2,113,767			22	44

== Seats changing hands ==
Seat	Pre-1979			Swing	Post-1979		
Seat	Party	Member	Margin	Swing	Margin	Member	Party
Bentleigh	Liberal	Bob Suggett	9.3	-9.5	0.2	Gordon Hockley	Labor
Coburg	Independent	Jack Mutton	5.4	-6.6	1.2	Peter Gavin	Labor
Essendon	Liberal	Kenneth Wheeler	0.1	-1.6	1.5	Barry Rowe	Labor
Geelong East	Liberal	Phil Gude	1.5	-3.2	1.7	Graham Ernst	Labor
Glenhuntly	Liberal	Joe Rafferty	8.1	-9.7	1.6	Gerard Vaughan	Labor
Heatherton	Liberal	Llew Reese	5.4	-6.4	1.0	Peter Spyker	Labor
Lowan	Liberal	Jim McCabe	11.7	-12.2	0.5	Bill McGrath	National
Oakleigh	Liberal	Alan Scanlan	1.3	-3.0	1.7	Race Mathews	Labor
Prahran	Liberal	Sam Loxton	5.7	-6.6	0.9	Bob Miller	Labor
Springvale	Liberal	Norman Billing	4.4	-5.1	0.7	Kevin King	Labor
Werribee	Liberal	Neville Hudson	0.1	-8.2	8.1	Ken Coghill	Labor

- Members listed in italics did not recontest their seats.
- In addition, Labor retained the seat of Greensborough, which it had won from the Liberals in a by-election.

== Post-election pendulum ==
Liberal seats (41)
Marginal
St Kilda	Brian Dixon	LIB	0.2%
Ballarat South	Joan Chambers	LIB	0.4%
Mitcham	George Cox	LIB	0.7%
Syndal	Geoff Coleman	LIB	0.7%
Geelong West	Hayden Birrell	LIB	0.8%
Noble Park	Peter Collins	LIB	1.0%
Bendigo	Daryl McClure	LIB	1.2%
Sandringham	Max Crellin	LIB	1.6%
Gisborne	Tom Reynolds	LIB	2.0%
Monbulk	Bill Borthwick	LIB	2.2%
Ivanhoe	Bruce Skeggs	LIB	3.4%
Box Hill	Donald Mackinnon	LIB	3.6%
Caulfield	Ted Tanner	LIB	3.8%
Evelyn	Jim Plowman	LIB	3.8%
Ringwood	Peter McArthur	LIB	4.1%
Forest Hill	John Richardson	LIB	5.0%
Midlands	Bill Ebery	LIB	5.0%
Narracan	Jim Balfour	LIB	5.1%
Ripon	Tom Austin	LIB	5.2%
Fairly safe
Bennettswood	Keith McCance	LIB	6.1%
Warrandyte	Norman Lacy	LIB	6.1%
Ballarat North	Tom Evans	LIB	6.3%
Mentone	Bill Templeton	LIB	6.5%
South Barwon	Aurel Smith	LIB	6.6%
Dromana	Roberts Dunstan	LIB	6.7%
Frankston	Graeme Weideman	LIB	7.2%
Wantirna	Geoff Hayes	LIB	7.6%
Portland	Don McKellar	LIB	8.0%
Berwick	Rob Maclellan	LIB	8.2%
Burwood	Jeff Kennett	LIB	9.1%
Hawthorn	Walter Jona	LIB	9.8%
Westernport	Alan Brown	LIB	9.9%
Safe
Doncaster	Morris Williams	LIB	10.9%
Kew	Rupert Hamer	LIB	11.2%
Warrnambool	Ian Smith	LIB	12.4%
Brighton	Jeannette Patrick	LIB	12.7%
Malvern	Lindsay Thompson	LIB	15.0%
Balwyn	Jim Ramsay	LIB	16.0%
Polwarth	Cec Burgin	LIB	18.7%
Benambra	Lou Lieberman	LIB	19.1%
Swan Hill	Alan Wood	LIB	24.8%

Labor seats (32)
Marginal
Bentleigh	Gordon Hockley	ALP	0.2%
Springvale	Kevin King	ALP	0.7%
Prahran	Bob Miller	ALP	0.9%
Heatherton	Peter Spyker	ALP	1.0%
Coburg	Peter Gavin	ALP	1.2% v IND
Essendon	Barry Rowe	ALP	1.5%
Glenhuntly	Gerard Vaughan	ALP	1.6%
Geelong East	Graham Ernst	ALP	1.7%
Oakleigh	Race Mathews	ALP	1.7%
Greensborough	Pauline Toner	ALP	3.9%
Fairly safe
Dandenong	Rob Jolly	ALP	6.5%
Werribee	Ken Coghill	ALP	8.1%
Knox	Steve Crabb	ALP	8.4%
Niddrie	Jack Simpson	ALP	9.7%
Safe
Bundoora	John Cain	ALP	10.6%
Carrum	Ian Cathie	ALP	11.9%
Albert Park	Bunna Walsh	ALP	14.0%
Geelong North	Neil Trezise	ALP	15.2%
Keilor	Jack Ginifer	ALP	15.2%
Melbourne	Keith Remington	ALP	16.0%
Morwell	Derek Amos	ALP	16.6%
Glenroy	Jack Culpin	ALP	16.7%
Williamstown	Gordon Stirling	ALP	16.8%
Ascot Vale	Tom Edmunds	ALP	16.8%
Richmond	Theo Sidiropoulos	ALP	20.4%
Reservoir	Jim Simmonds	ALP	21.0%
Preston	Carl Kirkwood	ALP	21.5%
Northcote	Frank Wilkes	ALP	21.9%
Footscray	Robert Fordham	ALP	24.3%
Sunshine	Bill Fogarty	ALP	24.5%
Brunswick	Tom Roper	ALP	25.5%
Broadmeadows	John Wilton	ALP	25.6%
National seats (8)
Lowan	Bill McGrath	NAT	0.5% v LIB
Gippsland South	Neil McInnes	NAT	6.9% v LIB
Benalla	Tom Trewin	NAT	15.4%
Gippsland East	Bruce Evans	NAT	17.3%
Murray Valley	Ken Jasper	NAT	20.5%
Shepparton	Peter Ross-Edwards	NAT	20.8%
Mildura	Milton Whiting	NAT	22.3%
Rodney	Eddie Hann	NAT	28.4%

== See also ==
- Candidates of the 1979 Victorian state election
