= Gerald Ashman =

Australian politician

Gerald Barry Ashman (born 27 November 1941) is a former Australian politician. He was a Liberal member of the Victorian Legislative Council from 1988 to 2002, representing first Boronia and then Koonung Province.

Ashman was a businessman before entering politics, working as a business consultant throughout the early 1980s. Prior to entering Parliament He was executive director of the StateChamer of Commerce and Industry Secretary of the Congress of Employer Associations Executive Director of the Small Business Association of Victoria A long-term member of the Liberal Party, he was chairperson of the Aston Federal Electorate Committee in 1984 and 1988, and convenor of the Small Business and Public Works Policy Committee in 1986 and 1988. In 1979 he unsuccessfully contested the state seat of Knox.

In 1988, Ashman was elected to the Victorian Legislative Council for Boronia Province, which he held until its abolition in 1996, when he moved to Koonung Province. He was Chairman of the Economic Development Committee and Transport Committees. A backbencher, he served on several committees but never rose to become a minister. He was defeated in 2002.
