= John Radford (politician) =

Australian politician

John William Storrier Radford (14 February 1930 – 27 November 2001) was an Australian politician.

Radford was born in Cottesloe, Western Australia, and later studied at Melbourne University. He married Margaret Ada Hodgson, with whom he had three children. From 1954 he farmed at Gowar East, and he was later an executive member of the Victorian Farmers' Union's pastoral division and a Kara Kara shire councillor. A member of the Liberal Party, he was president of the St Arnaud branch from 1966 to 1975 and served on the electoral committees for the state seat of Ripon and the federal seat of Wimmera (the latter as vice-president). In 1979 he was elected to the Victorian Legislative Council for Bendigo Province, serving until 1985. He later made an attempt to enter federal parliament via the seat of Bendigo in 1987, but was defeated.
