= Electoral district of Westernport =

Former state electoral district of Victoria, Australia

Westernport Victoria—Legislative Assembly
- State: Victoria
- Created: 1976
- Abolished: 1985
- Namesake: Western Port
- Demographic: Outer metropolitan

The Electoral district of Westernport was an electoral district of the Victorian Legislative Assembly.

== Members ==
Member	Party	Term
Doug Jennings	Liberal/Independent	1976–1979
Alan Brown	Liberal	1979–1985

== See also ==
- Parliaments of the Australian states and territories
- List of members of the Victorian Legislative Assembly
