= Dick Long =

Australian politician (1924–2021)

Richard John Long (4 May 1924 – 28 July 2021) was an Australian politician.

Long was born in Leongatha, Victoria, to John Adrian Long and Doris May. He served in World War II as an RAAF pilot from 1943 to 1946, after which he received his Bachelor of Law from Melbourne University and became a solicitor. From 1950, he worked for the firm of Gray, Friend & Long in Warragul. A member of the Liberal Party, he was elected to the Victorian Legislative Council for Gippsland in 1973. He served until 1992, when he retired. He died on 28 July 2021 at the age of 97.

Victorian Legislative Council
Preceded by Bob May	Member for Gippsland; 1973–1992; Served alongside: Eric Kent; James Taylor; Barry Murphy; Peter Hall	Succeeded by Philip Davis
