= Barry Murphy (politician) =

Australian politician

Barry Alan Murphy (born 13 May 1939) is a former Australian politician.

Murphy was born in Bairnsdale to labourer Alan George Murphy and Nancy Loisa Eastwood. He attended local state schools before becoming an apprentice butcher from 1953 to 1958. In 1960 he became a form setter with the State Electricity Commission at Morwell. On 11 February 1961 he married Denielle Hughes, with whom he had two children; that year he also joined the Morwell branch of the Labor Party. He served in the Citizen Military Forces from 1961 to 1966 and was branch vice-president of the Federated Engine Drivers' and Firemen's Association from 1964 to 1967. In 1970 he was appointed country organiser of the Victorian Labor Party, leaving in 1973 to become a contractor for Victorian Railways. He sat on Morwell Shire Council from 1968 to 1971 and was chairman of the McMillan federal electorate assembly in 1979. In 1982 he was elected to the Victorian Legislative Council for Gippsland Province. He resigned from the Labor Party in 1988 and ran unsuccessfully as an independent candidate for the Legislative Assembly seat of Morwell in that year's state election, and again in the 1992 election.
