= Bob Miller (Australian politician) =

Australian politician (1941–2026)

Robert Henry Miller
- In office May 1979 – January 1985
- Preceded by: Sam Loxton
- Succeeded by: Don Hayward
- Constituency: Prahran

Personal details
- Born: 12 March 1941 Horsham, Victoria, Australia
- Died: 16 June 2026 (aged 85)
- Party: Labor
- Education: University of Melbourne, University of California, Yale University
- Profession: Barrister, lecturer
Australian rules football career
Personal information
- Height: 185 cm (6 ft 1 in)
- Weight: 83 kg (183 lb)
Playing career
Years	Club	Games (Goals)
1960–1965	Melbourne	69 (3)

Robert Henry Miller (12 March 1941 – 16 June 2026) was an Labor Party politician and Australian rules footballer who played for Melbourne in the Victorian Football League (VFL) during the early 1960s.

Miller, who was used mostly as a ruck-rover or defender, was recruited to the Melbourne Football Club from Horsham. He made his debut in 1961, for a Norm Smith coached team which had appeared in the previous seven VFL Grand Finals. Although Miller contested finals in his first three seasons, including a Preliminary Final loss in 1963, he never got to play in a premiership decider. Melbourne did make the 1964 VFL Grand Final, which they won, but Miller was not selected. He retired at the end of the 1965 season, having played 69 senior games with Melbourne.

In 1966–67, Miller was an assistant professor of law at the University of Western Ontario, Canada, and between 1967 and 1970 he was a human rights officer at the United Nations in New York. He became a barrister in 1971, signing the Victorian Bar Roll on 11 November 1971; he also lectured in law at Monash University between 1971 and 1979.

He joined the Australian Labor Party in 1970 and nine years later was elected to the Victorian Legislative Assembly for the Prahran. Miller served two terms. When his second term ended in 1985, Miller contested the seat of Monash in the Victorian Legislative Council but lost to the Liberal's Reg Macey.

Miller died on 16 June 2026, at the age of 85.
