= Andrew McCutcheon =

Australian politician (1931–2017)

Arthur Andrew McCutcheon (29 September 1931 – 16 December 2017) was an Australian politician who served as Attorney-General of Victoria from 1987 to 1990.

== Biography ==
McCutcheon was born in Melbourne to Sir Osborn McCutcheon, an architect, and Molly Buley. He attended Wesley College and then Melbourne University, from which he received a Bachelor of Architecture.

McCutcheon worked as an architect, including as an associate of the Royal Australian Institute of Architects, of which he was vice-president from 1973 to 1976. He was also involved in Methodist mission work, and was a minister in Collingwood from 1961 to 1969.

A member of the Labor Party from 1961, from 1965 to 1982 McCutcheon was a Collingwood City councillor, including a period as mayor from 1975 to 1976. In 1982 he was elected to the Victorian Legislative Assembly as the member for St Kilda. He was Minister for Water Resources and for Property and Services from 1985 to 1987 and Attorney-General from 1987 to 1990; he also held the portfolios of Local Government (1988–89), Ethnic Affairs (1989–90) and the Arts (1990). From 1990 to 1992 he was Minister for Planning and Urban Growth (later Planning and Housing). McCutcheon's seat was abolished in 1992 and he retired from politics.

McCutcheon ran a wine business "Ten Minutes by Tractor" in Main Ridge, Victoria; the property was planted with vines in 1993 and the first vintage was released in 2000.

In his senior years, he visited indigenous communities across Northern and Central Australia and promoted land rights through the Port Phillip Citizens for Reconciliation group.

Andrew McCutcheon died on 16 December 2017, aged 86.

Victorian Legislative Assembly
Preceded by Brian Dixon	Member for St Kilda; 1982–1992	District abolished
Political offices
Preceded by Jim Kennan	Attorney-General of Victoria; 1987–1990	Succeeded by Jim Kennan
