= Thomastown Province =

Former electoral province of the Victorian Legislative Council, Australia

Coordinates: 37.682°S 145.014°E

Thomastown Province Victoria—Legislative Council
- State: Victoria
- Created: 1976
- Abolished: 1988
- Demographic: Metropolitan

The Thomastown Province was an electorate of the Victorian Legislative Council (Australia), centred on Thomastown, Victoria. It was abolished in 1988.

== Members for Thomastown ==
Member 1	Party	Year		
Dolph Eddy	Labor	1976	Member 2	Party
Dolph Eddy	Labor	1979	Glyde Butler	Labor
Jim Kennan	Labor	1982	Glyde Butler	Labor

== Election results ==
1982 Victorian state election: Thomastown Province
Party	Candidate	Votes	%	±%
Labor	Jim Kennan	86,102	72.1	+3.7
Liberal	Rae Kennett	33,361	27.9	−3.7
Total formal votes		119,463	94.8	+0.3
Informal votes		6,488	5.2	−0.3
Turnout		125,951	94.7	+0.9
Labor hold		Swing	+3.7	

== See also ==
- Parliaments of the Australian states and territories
- List of members of the Victorian Legislative Council
