= Electoral district of Bundoora =

State electoral district of Victoria, Australia

Coordinates: 37.697°S 145.067°E

Bundoora Victoria—Legislative Assembly
- Interactive map of electoral district boundaries from the 2022 state election
- State: Victoria
- Created: 1976
- MP: Colin Brooks
- Party: Labor
- Namesake: Suburb of Bundoora
- Electors: 40,892 (2018)
- Area: 35 km^{2} (13.5 sq mi)
- Demographic: Metropolitan

Bundoora is an electoral district of the Victorian Legislative Assembly. It covers an area of 35 square kilometres (14 sq mi) in north-eastern Melbourne, encompassing the suburbs of Bundoora, Kingsbury, Watsonia and Watsonia North, and parts of Greensborough, Macleod, Mill Park and Yallambie. It also includes the central campus of La Trobe University. It lies within the North-Eastern Metropolitan Region of the upper house, the Legislative Council.

Bundoora has been a safe seat for the Labor Party throughout its history. It was first contested in 1976, and was won by John Cain, son of former premier John Cain. He rapidly rose through the parliamentary ranks to become Labor leader in 1981 and premier himself in 1982. Cain was comfortably re-elected throughout the 1980s, resigned as premier in 1990, and retired as member for Bundoora at the 1992 election.

Cain was succeeded by Sherryl Garbutt, formerly the member for the abolished Greensborough. Garbutt served as a shadow minister in opposition from 1993 to 1999, and after Labor regained government at the 1999 election served as a minister in the first two terms of the Bracks government. She respectively served as Minister for Women's Affairs (1999-2002), Minister for Environment and Conservation (1999-2002) and Minister for Community Services (2002-2006), before retiring at the 2006 election.

Following Garbutt's retirement announcement in 2005, Minister for Sport and Recreation and Minister for the Commonwealth Games Justin Madden, who held a seat in the Legislative Council, initially sought and won preselection for Bundoora. However, in October 2006, the month before the 2006 state election, the sudden retirement of Northcote MP Mary Delahunty resulted in a three-way deal that saw Fiona Richardson nominate for Northcote instead of the Legislative Council, Madden take Richardson's former place on the Legislative Council ticket, and former City of Banyule mayor Colin Brooks stand in Bundoora. Brooks had earlier challenged Madden for Bundoora preselection, but had withdrawn his nomination. Brooks won the seat, and was easily re-elected in 2010 and 2014.

== Members for Bundoora ==
Member	Party	Term
John Cain	Labor	1976–1992
Sherryl Garbutt	Labor	1992–2006
Colin Brooks	Labor	2006–present

== Election results ==
2022 Victorian state election: Bundoora
Party	Candidate	Votes	%	±%
Labor	Colin Brooks	19,288	47.8	−7.7
Liberal	Sahil Tomar	11,167	27.7	−1.8
Greens	Julie O'Brien	5,311	13.2	+5.1
Freedom	Andrew Lu	1,637	4.1	+4.1
Family First	Ethan Jones	1,294	3.2	+3.2
Animal Justice	Bella Holgate	1,231	3.1	+0.6
Ind. (Child Protection)	Eric Koelmeyer	408	1.0	+1.0
Total formal votes		40,336	94.8	+0.5
Informal votes		2,209	5.2	−0.5
Turnout		42,545	89.9	−0.3
Two-party-preferred result
Labor	Colin Brooks	25,288	62.7	−3.6
Liberal	Sahil Tomar	15,048	37.3	+3.6
Labor hold		Swing	−3.6	

Two-party-preferred vote results in Bundoora View source data.
