= Gracia Baylor =

Australian politician (1929–2025)

Hilda Gracia Baylor AM (8 October 1929 – 23 May 2025) was an Australian politician, who was one of the first two women elected to the Victorian Legislative Council in 1979, the other being Joan Coxsedge.

== Life and career ==
Baylor was born in Brisbane on 8 October 1929. Her father was in the military and the family eventually settled in Victoria. She studied fine art and teaching, and taught in secondary schools until she married. Following her first marriage, she worked as a law clerk and managed one of the three law practices of her husband, Richard Baylor.

She became interested in local government when she became aware of the lack of a kindergarten near her home. She was elected to the Healesville Shire Council in 1966, and was shire president from 1977 to 1978, becoming the first female shire president in Victoria.

At the 1979 Victorian election, she was elected to Boronia Province in the Victorian Legislative Council as a member of the Liberal Party, one of the first two women elected to the Council alongside Joan Coxsedge of the Australian Labor Party. Baylor held her seat until 1985 when she resigned to contest the Legislative Assembly electorate of Warrandyte, a bid that was unsuccessful.

She continued to be involved in women's issues, including a serving term as the president of the National Council of Women (1997–2000). She was inducted onto the Victorian Honour Roll of Women in 2003.

Baylor died on 23 May 2025, at the age of 95.
