= Boronia Province =

Former electoral province of the Victorian Legislative Council, Australia

Boronia Province was an electorate of the Victorian Legislative Council. It was abolished progressively in 1992 and 1996 and was replaced with Koonung Province.

== Members ==
Members for Boronia Province
| Year | Member | Party | Member | Party |
|---|---|---|---|---|
| 1967 | Gilbert Chandler | Liberal | | |
| 1970 | Gilbert Chandler | Liberal | Vernon Hauser | Liberal |
| 1973 | Peter Block | Liberal | Vernon Hauser | Liberal |
| 1976 | Peter Block | Liberal | Kevin Foley | Liberal |
| 1979 | Gracia Baylor | Liberal | Kevin Foley | Liberal |
| 1982 | Gracia Baylor | Liberal | Judith Dixon | Labor |
| 1985 | Jean McLean | Labor | Judith Dixon | Labor |
| 1988 | Jean McLean | Labor | Gerald Ashman | Liberal |
| 1992 | | | Gerald Ashman | Liberal |

== Election results ==
1988 Victorian state election: Boronia Province
| Party | Candidate | Votes | % | ±% |
|---|---|---|---|---|
| Liberal | Gerald Ashman | 56,754 | 51.2 | +3.2 |
| Labor | Judith Dixon | 54,133 | 48.8 | +3.2 |
| Total formal votes | | 110,887 | 96.1 | −1.4 |
| Informal votes | | 4,514 | 3.9 | +1.4 |
| Turnout | | 115,401 | 94.2 | −0.8 |
| Liberal gain from Labor | | Swing | +1.7 | |
