= Vernon Hauser =

Australian politician

Vernon Thomas Hauser (5 August 1928 – 11 September 2015), Australian politician, was a Member of the Victorian Legislative Council for Boronia Province from 1970–76 and for Nunawading Province from 1976-82 representing the Liberal Party. He was defeated at the 1982 election that saw the defeat of the Lindsay Thompson Liberal government and the election of a Labor Party (ALP) government led by John Cain Jr. (whom he went to school with and defeated at high school debates).

Hauser was educated at Carlton, Preston and Strathfieldsaye Primary Schools, Northcote High School, Bendigo High School; and at the Royal Military College, Duntroon. He was only 17 when his father died and had to leave Duntroon and return home to his family to support them. He started sweeping floors at Potter @ co in 1946 and was so diligent that Mr Potter (Ian) initialised his inclusion on the staff of his firm. He was subsequently elected a member of the Stock Exchange of Melbourne in 1960. He was president of Bell Potter Securities, and a member of many charitable committees, including the RSPCA.

He was President of the Victorian Young Liberals from 1950-52. In Parliament he was a member of the Standing Orders Committee from 1970–1973 and the Conservation of Energy Resources Committee from 1976-1982. He was an advocate of states rights and an opponent of greater powers to the federal government.

Hauser was married to Beverley Hogan (1929–1989). He has two sons – Stephen (1963–2010) and Simon (1964).
