= Peter Block (politician) =

Australian politician

Peter David Block (27 May 1935 – 19 October 1992) was an Australian politician.

Block was born in Melbourne to insurance executive Harry S. Bloch and Eva, née Davies. He attended Haileybury College before serving with the Royal Australian Air Force as part of national service from 1952 to 1953. From 1956 to 1958 he was a manager at A.S. Horn Pty Ltd, becoming the Australian manager of P.F. Collier Inc from 1961 to 1965. He also worked as an actor and professional golfer. In 1973 he was elected to the Victorian Legislative Council as a Liberal, representing Boronia Province; he transferred to Nunawading Province in 1979 and served until 1985.
