= Joan Coxsedge =

Australian politician and activist (1931–2024)

Member of the Victorian Legislative Council
- In office 5 May 1979 – 2 October 1992
- Constituency: Melbourne West Province

Personal details
- Born: Joan Marjorie Rochester; 5 January 1931 Ballarat, Victoria, Australia
- Died: 14 January 2024 (aged 93) Kew, Victoria, Australia
- Party: Labor
- Spouse: Cedric Coxsedge (m. 1953)

Joan Marjorie Coxsedge (5 January 1931 – 14 January 2024) was an Australian activist, politician, and artist. In 1979, she was one of the first two women elected to the Victorian Legislative Council.

== Biography ==
Born Joan Rochester, the daughter of Roy and Marjorie Rochester, she was a native of Ballarat. After leaving school, she worked as a professional artist, and married Cedric Coxsedge in 1953. She joined the Australian Labor Party (ALP) in 1967. A leading figure in the left wing of the Victorian ALP, she soon became involved with the Save Our Sons Movement, which opposed conscription for the Vietnam War. In 1971, along with four other members of the movement, she was imprisoned for anti-conscription activities. Two years later she was the founding chair of the Committee for the Abolition of Political Police.

Her first attempts at gaining parliamentary office were unsuccessful. She stood for election for the Victorian Legislative Assembly at the 1973 and 1976 state elections, but failed to win a seat. In 1979, she was elected to the Victorian Legislative Council for the Melbourne West Province, serving until 1992.

Coxsedge died on 14 January 2024, at the age of 93. She was survived by her three children and their families.
