= Electoral results for the Melbourne West Province =

Victoria, Australia, district election results

This is a list of electoral results for the Melbourne West Province in Victorian state elections.

== Members for Melbourne West Province ==
Member 1	Party	Year	Member 2	Party
John Aikman	Non-Labor	1904	William Edgar	Non-Labor
John Aikman	Non-Labor	1907	William Edgar	Non-Labor
John Aikman	Non-Labor	1910	William Edgar	Non-Labor
John Aikman	Non-Labor	1913	William Fielding	Labor
John Aikman	Non-Labor	1916	Arthur Disney	Labor
Daniel McNamara	Labor	1916	Arthur Disney	Labor
John Aikman	Non-Labor	1916	Arthur Disney	Labor
John Aikman	Nationalist	1917	Arthur Disney	Labor
John Aikman	Nationalist	1919	Arthur Disney	Labor
Robert Williams	Labor	1922	Arthur Disney	Labor
Robert Williams	Labor	1925	Arthur Disney	Labor
Robert Williams	Labor	1928	Arthur Disney	Labor
Robert Williams	Labor	1931	Arthur Disney	Labor
Robert Williams	Independent	1932	Arthur Disney	Labor
Robert Williams	Independent	1934	Arthur Disney	Labor
Robert Williams	Independent	1937	Arthur Disney	Labor
Pat Kennelly	Labor	1938	Arthur Disney	Labor
Pat Kennelly	Labor	1940	Arthur Disney	Labor
Pat Kennelly	Labor	1943	Arthur Disney	Labor
Pat Kennelly	Labor	1943	Les Coleman	Labor
Pat Kennelly	Labor	1946	Les Coleman	Labor
Pat Kennelly	Labor	1949	Les Coleman	Labor
Bert Bailey	Labor	1952	Les Coleman	Labor
Bert Bailey	Labor (A-C)	1955	Les Coleman	Labor (A-C)
Bert Bailey	Labor (A-C)	1955	Buckley Machin	Labor
Archie Todd	Labor	1958	Buckley Machin	Labor
Archie Todd	Labor	1961	Buckley Machin	Labor
Archie Todd	Labor	1963	Alexander Knight	Labor
Archie Todd	Labor	1964	Alexander Knight	Labor
Archie Todd	Labor	1967	Alexander Knight	Labor
Bunna Walsh	Labor	1970	Alexander Knight	Labor
Bon Thomas	Labor	1970	Alexander Knight	Labor
Bon Thomas	Labor	1973	Alexander Knight	Labor
Bon Thomas	Labor	1976	Alexander Knight	Labor
Bon Thomas	Labor	1979	Joan Coxsedge	Labor
Joan Kirner	Labor	1982	Joan Coxsedge	Labor
Joan Kirner	Labor	1985	Joan Coxsedge	Labor
Licia Kokocinski	Labor	1988	Joan Coxsedge	Labor
Licia Kokocinski	Labor	1992	Jean McLean	Labor
Sang Nguyen	Labor	1996	Jean McLean	Labor
Sang Nguyen	Labor	1999	Kaye Darveniza	Labor
Sang Nguyen	Labor	2002	Kaye Darveniza	Labor

== Election results ==
=== Elections in the 2000s ===
2002 Victorian state election: Melbourne West Province
Party	Candidate	Votes	%	±%
Labor	Sang Nguyen	78,617	60.4	−0.7
Liberal	Peter Hammond	32,350	24.9	−8.2
Greens	Andrew Ellis	15,007	11.5	+11.5
Democrats	Barry Thomas	4,123	3.2	−2.6
Total formal votes		130,097	95.4	−0.3
Informal votes		6,314	4.6	+0.3
Turnout		136,411	92.3	
Two-party-preferred result
Labor	Sang Nguyen	91,780	70.6	+5.7
Liberal	Peter Hammond	38,237	29.4	−5.7
Labor hold		Swing	+5.7	

=== Elections in the 1990s ===
1999 Victorian state election: Melbourne West Province
Party	Candidate	Votes	%	±%
Labor	Kaye Darveniza	79,460	60.8	+13.2
Liberal	Angela Borg	43,561	33.3	−0.2
Democrats	Diane Bames	7,682	5.9	+2.8
Total formal votes		130,703	95.8	−0.4
Informal votes		5,801	4.2	+0.4
Turnout		136,504	92.9	
Two-party-preferred result
Labor	Kaye Darveniza	84,297	64.5	+3.3
Liberal	Angela Borg	46,404	35.5	−3.3
Labor hold		Swing	+3.3	

1996 Victorian state election: Melbourne West Province
Party	Candidate	Votes	%	±%
Labor	Sang Nguyen	59,414	47.6	+2.7
Liberal	Chris MacGregor	41,861	33.5	+3.7
Independent	Les Twentyman	12,878	10.3	−12.6
Democratic Labor	Kevin Carroll	4,876	3.9	+1.6
Democrats	Alan Parker	3,867	3.1	+3.1
Natural Law	Panayiota Stamatopoulou	1,064	0.9	+0.9
Independent	Joe Santana	853	0.7	+0.7
Total formal votes		124,813	96.1	+1.4
Informal votes		5,053	3.9	−1.4
Turnout		129,866	93.7	
Two-party-preferred result
Labor	Sang Nguyen	76,203	61.2	+5.6
Liberal	Chris MacGregor	48,360	38.8	−5.6
Labor hold		Swing	+5.6	

1992 Victorian state election: Melbourne West Province
Party	Candidate	Votes	%	±%
Labor	Jean McLean	51,960	44.9	−18.2
Liberal	Patricia Vejby	34,543	29.9	−7.0
Independent	Les Twentyman	26,499	22.9	+22.9
Democratic Labor	Maurice Allen	2,693	2.3	+2.3
Total formal votes		115,695	94.7	+1.7
Informal votes		6,520	5.3	−1.7
Turnout		122,215	95.2	
Two-party-preferred result
Labor	Jean McLean	64,176	55.6	−7.5
Liberal	Patricia Vejby	51,199	44.4	+7.5
Labor hold		Swing	−7.5	

=== Elections in the 1980s ===
1988 Victorian state election: Melbourne West Province
Party	Candidate	Votes	%	±%
Labor	Licia Kokocinski	69,482	63.4	+0.5
Liberal	Darren Olney	40,123	36.6	+7.6
Total formal votes		109,605	92.9	−2.8
Informal votes		8,399	7.1	+2.8
Turnout		118,004	91.6	−0.9
Labor hold		Swing	−3.5	

1985 Victorian state election: Melbourne West Province
Party	Candidate	Votes	%	±%
Labor	Joan Coxsedge	68,229	62.9	
Liberal	Matthew Matich	31,474	29.0	
Democrats	Johannus Paas	8,821	8.1	
Total formal votes		108,524	95.7	
Informal votes		4,929	4.3	
Turnout		113,453	92.4	
Two-party-preferred result
Labor	Joan Coxsedge	72,603	66.9	−4.8
Liberal	Matthew Matich	35,921	33.1	+4.8
Labor hold		Swing	−4.8	

1982 Victorian state election: Melbourne West Province
Party	Candidate	Votes	%	±%
Labor	Joan Kirner	71,793	66.5	+13.7
Liberal	Matthew Matich	25,210	23.4	−5.6
Democrats	Darryl Carlton	8,607	8.0	+2.7
Democratic Labor	Margaret Reed	2,302	2.1	+2.1
Total formal votes		107,912	94.7	0.0
Informal votes		6,026	5.3	0.0
Turnout		113,938	93.9	+1.7
Two-party-preferred result
Labor	Joan Kirner		71.7	+6.8
Liberal	Matthew Matich		28.3	−6.8
Labor hold		Swing	+6.8	

- Two party preferred vote was estimated.

=== Elections in the 1970s ===
1979 Victorian state election: Melbourne West Province
Party	Candidate	Votes	%	±%
Labor	Joan Coxsedge	54,263	52.8	−7.1
Liberal	Rino Baggio	29,842	29.0	−11.2
Independent	Alexander Knight	13,202	12.9	+12.9
Democrats	Ivan Pollock	5,466	5.3	+5.3
Total formal votes		102,773	94.7	−0.2
Informal votes		5,716	5.3	+0.2
Turnout		108,489	93.6	+1.4
Labor hold		Swing	N/A	

- Preferences were not distributed.

1976 Victorian state election: Melbourne West Province
Party	Candidate	Votes	%	±%
Labor	Bon Thomas	60,144	59.9	
Liberal	Peter Stirling	40,339	40.2	
Total formal votes		100,483	94.9	
Informal votes		5,407	5.1	
Turnout		105,890	92.2	
Labor hold		Swing		

1973 Victorian state election: Melbourne West Province
Party	Candidate	Votes	%	±%
Labor	Alexander Knight	74,939	54.7	+0.8
Liberal	Neville Hudson	49,189	35.9	+7.7
Democratic Labor	Robin Thomas	12,874	9.4	−8.6
Total formal votes		137,002	93.9	−0.6
Informal votes		8,960	6.1	+0.6
Turnout		145,962	93.9	−1.0
Two-party-preferred result
Labor	Alexander Knight		55.6	0.0
Liberal	Neville Hudson		44.4	0.0
Labor hold		Swing	0.0	

- Two party preferred vote was estimated.

1970 Melbourne West Province state by-election
Party	Candidate	Votes	%	±%
Labor	Bon Thomas	67,552	67.3	+13.4
Defence of Government Schools	Raymond Nilsen	32,764	32.7	+32.7
Total formal votes		100,316	93.0	−0.8
Informal votes		7,575	7.0	+0.8
Turnout		107,891	80.8	−14.2
Labor hold		Swing	+11.7	

- This by-election was caused by the disqualification of Bunna Walsh.

1970 Victorian state election: Melbourne West Province
Party	Candidate	Votes	%	±%
Labor	Bunna Walsh	62,584	53.9	−4.0
Liberal	William McDonald	36,692	28.2	+7.1
Democratic Labor	Kenneth Berrie	20,865	18.0	−3.0
Total formal votes		120,141	93.8	−0.4
Informal votes		7,608	6.2	+0.4
Turnout		127,749	95.0	+1.1
Two-party-preferred result
Labor	Bunna Walsh		55.6	−4.4
Liberal	William McDonald		44.4	+4.4
Labor hold		Swing	−4.4	

- Two party preferred vote was estimated.

=== Elections in the 1960s ===
1967 Victorian state election: Melbourne West Province
Party	Candidate	Votes	%	±%
Labor	Alexander Knight	60,703	57.9	
Liberal	Joseph Kadane	22,161	21.1	
Democratic Labor	Kenneth Berrie	21,996	21.0	
Total formal votes		104,860	94.2	
Informal votes		6,407	5.8	
Turnout		111,267	93.9	
Two-party-preferred result
Labor	Alexander Knight		60.0	
Liberal	Joseph Kadane		40.0	
Labor hold		Swing		

- Two party preferred was estimated.

1964 Victorian state election: Melbourne West Province
Party	Candidate	Votes	%	±%
Labor	Archie Todd	52,700	60.6	−2.3
Liberal and Country	Graham Strang	18,135	20.9	+6.6
Democratic Labor	Bert Bailey	16,062	18.5	−4.4
Total formal votes		86,897	95.7	−1.0
Informal votes		3,934	4.3	+1.0
Turnout		90,831	94.2	−0.8
Two-party-preferred result
Labor	Archie Todd		62.5	−1.8
Liberal and Country	Graham Strang		37.5	+1.8
Labor hold		Swing	−1.8	

1961 Victorian state election: Melbourne West Province
Party	Candidate	Votes	%	±%
Labor	Buckley Machin	55,115	62.9	−8.4
Democratic Labor	Bert Bailey	20,055	22.9	−5.8
Liberal and Country	Dudley Coombes	12,511	14.3	+14.3
Total formal votes		87,681	95.6	−2.0
Informal votes		4,038	4.4	+2.0
Turnout		91,719	94.3	+1.9
Two-candidate-preferred result
Labor	Buckley Machin		64.3	−7.0
Democratic Labor	Bert Bailey		35.7	+7.0
Labor hold		Swing	−7.0	

- Two party preferred vote was estimated.

=== Elections in the 1950s ===
1958 Victorian Legislative Council election: Melbourne West Province
Party	Candidate	Votes	%	±%
Labor	Archie Todd	64,209	71.3	+1.4
Democratic Labor	Bert Bailey	25,797	28.7	−1.4
Total formal votes		90,006	97.6	+0.3
Informal votes		2,228	2.4	−0.3
Turnout		92,234	92.4	+0.1
Labor hold		Swing	+1.4	

- Bert Bailey was elected in 1952 as a member of Labor, then defected to the DLP in 1955.
