= Members of the Victorian Legislative Council, 1961–1964 =

- ←1958–1961 1964–1967→

This is a list of members of the Victorian Legislative Council between 1961 and 1964. As half of the Legislative Council's terms expired at each triennial election, half of these members were elected at the 1958 triennial election with terms expiring in 1964, while the other half were elected at the 1961 state election with terms expiring in 1967.

The 1961 election was the first conjoint election for the Legislative Assembly and half of the Legislative Council; from that point forward, the triennial election for the Council and the general election for the Assembly would always be held on the same day, although this was not provided for automatically until 1984.^{[1]}

Name	Party	Province	Term expires	Term of office
Keith Bradbury	Country	North Eastern	1967	1953–1978
Percy Byrnes	Country	North Western	1964	1942–1969
Murray Byrne	Liberal	Ballarat	1964	1958–1976
Hon Ewen Paul Cameron^{[3]}	Liberal	East Yarra	1967	1948–1964
Bill Campbell^{[3]}	Liberal	East Yarra	1967	1964–1983
Hon Gilbert Chandler	Liberal	Southern	1967	1935–1973
Vance Dickie	Liberal	Ballarat	1967	1956–1978
Doug Elliot	Labor	Melbourne	1967	1960–1979
Percy Feltham	Country	Northern	1967	1955–1967
Bill Fulton	Country	Gippsland	1964	1953–1964
John Galbally	Labor	Melbourne North	1967	1949–1979
Raymond Garrett	Liberal	Southern	1964	1958–1976
Charles Gawith	Liberal	Monash	1967	1955–1967
Thomas Grigg	Liberal	Bendigo	1967	1951–1967
Kenneth Gross	Liberal	Western	1964	1958–1976
Rupert Hamer	Liberal	East Yarra	1964	1958–1971
Alan Hunt	Liberal	South Eastern	1967	1961–1992
Alexander Knight^{[2]}	Labor	Melbourne West	1967	1963–1979
Hon Sir Gordon McArthur	Liberal	South Western	1967	1931–1965
Buckley Machin^{[2]}	Labor	Melbourne West	1967	1955–1963
Ronald Mack	Liberal	Western	1967	1955–1968
Bill Mair	Liberal	South Eastern	1964	1958–1964
Arthur Mansell	Country	North Western	1967	1952–1973
Bob May	Country	Gippsland	1967	1957–1973
Samuel Merrifield	Labor	Doutta Galla	1964	1958–1970
Graham Nicol	Liberal	Monash	1964	1958–1976
Jack O'Connell	Labor	Melbourne	1964	1958–1972
Arthur Smith	Labor	Bendigo	1964	1952–1964
Ivan Swinburne	Country	North Eastern	1964	1946–1976
Geoffrey Thom	Liberal	South Western	1964	1958–1970
Hon Lindsay Thompson	Liberal	Higinbotham	1967	1955–1970
Archie Todd	Labor	Melbourne West	1964	1958–1970
John Tripovich	Labor	Doutta Galla	1967	1960–1976
Hon Sir Arthur Warner	Liberal	Higinbotham	1964	1946–1964
Dudley Walters	Country	Northern	1964	1946–1964
John Walton	Labor	Melbourne North	1964	1958–1982

^{1} The 1943 state election and the 1943 triennial election were both held on 12 June 1943, and the same took place in 1904; however, these were not conjoint elections, as until 1950 the two elections had different franchise and separate rolls. See Taylor, Greg (2006). The Constitution of Victoria. Federation Press. p. 50. ISBN 1-86287-612-6.
^{2} On 20 June 1963, Buckley Machin, Labor MLC for Melbourne West Province, died. Labor candidate Alexander Knight won the resulting by-election on 10 August 1963.
^{3} On 18 January 1964, Ewen Paul Cameron, Liberal MLC for East Yarra Province, died. Liberal candidate Bill Campbell won the resulting by-election on 14 March 1964.

== Sources ==
- "Find a Member". State Government of Victoria.
- Victorian Year Book 1961–64
