= Members of the Victorian Legislative Council, 1970–1973 =

- ←1967–1970 1973–1976→

This is a list of members of the Victorian Legislative Council between 1970 and 1973. As half of the Legislative Council's terms expired at each triennial election, half of these members were elected at the 1967 state election with terms expiring in 1973, while the other half were elected at the 1970 state election with terms expiring in 1976. A redistribution in 1965 had created the new provinces of Boronia and Templestowe out of the former Southern Province; the full redistribution took effect at the 1970 election.

Name	Party	Province	Term expires	Term of office
Keith Bradbury	Country	North Eastern	1973	1953–1978
Hon Murray Byrne	Liberal	Ballarat	1976	1958–1976
Bill Campbell	Liberal	East Yarra	1973	1964–1983
Hon Sir Gilbert Chandler	Liberal	Boronia	1973	1935–1973
Michael Clarke	Country	Northern	1976	1964–1976
Hon Vance Dickie	Liberal	Ballarat	1973	1956–1978
Bernie Dunn	Country	North Western	1976	1969–1988
Dolph Eddy	Labor	Doutta Galla	1976	1970–1982
Doug Elliot	Labor	Melbourne	1973	1960–1979
Hon William Fry	Liberal	Higinbotham	1973	1967–1979
John Galbally	Labor	Melbourne North	1973	1949–1979
Raymond Garrett	Liberal	Templestowe	1976	1958–1976
Stan Gleeson	Liberal	South Western	1973	1965–1979
Jock Granter	Liberal	Bendigo	1976	1964–1988
Fred Grimwade	Liberal	Bendigo	1973	1967–1987
Kenneth Gross	Liberal	Western	1976	1958–1976
Hon Rupert Hamer^{[3]}	Liberal	East Yarra	1976	1958–1971
Vernon Hauser	Liberal	Boronia	1976	1970–1982
Murray Hamilton	Liberal	Higinbotham	1976	1967–1982
Charles Hider^{[1]}	Liberal	Monash	1973	1970–1979
Hon Vasey Houghton	Liberal	Templestowe	1973	1967–1985
Hon Alan Hunt	Liberal	South Eastern	1973	1961–1992
Glyn Jenkins	Liberal	South Western	1976	1970–1982
Eric Kent	Labor	Gippsland	1976	1970–1976, 1979–1985
Alexander Knight	Labor	Melbourne West	1973	1963–1979
Stuart McDonald	Country	Northern	1973	1967–1979
Arthur Mansell	Country	North Western	1973	1952–1973
Bob May	Country	Gippsland	1973	1957–1973
Clive Mitchell	Country	Western	1973	1968–1973
Graham Nicol	Liberal	Monash	1976	1958–1976
Jack O'Connell^{[4]}	Labor	Melbourne	1976	1958–1972
Haddon Storey^{[3]}	Liberal	East Yarra	1976	1971–1996
Ivan Swinburne	Country	North Eastern	1976	1946–1976
Bon Thomas^{[2]}	Labor	Melbourne West	1976	1970–1982
Ivan Trayling^{[4]}	Labor	Melbourne	1976	1972–1982
John Tripovich	Labor	Doutta Galla	1973	1960–1976
John Walton	Labor	Melbourne North	1976	1958–1982
Roy Ward	Liberal	South Eastern	1976	1970–1988
Bunna Walsh^{[2]}	Labor	Melbourne West	1976	1970

^{1} Charles Hider was elected at a by-election to fill the remaining three years of Lindsay Thompson's term in Monash Province, which was held on the same day as the 1970 elections.
^{2} Labor candidate Bunna Walsh, who won the Melbourne West Province seat at the 1970 election, was not admitted to the Council due to a conviction 20 years earlier for robbery with violence in the South Melbourne Children's Court. His election was then declared void in September 1970 by the Court of Disputed Returns, and Labor candidate Bon Thomas won the resulting by-election on 24 October 1970.
^{3} In March 1981, Rupert Hamer, Liberal MLC for East Yarra Province, resigned to contest the Legislative Assembly by-election in the seat of Kew. Liberal candidate Haddon Storey won the resulting by-election on 17 April 1971.
^{4} On 20 April 1972, Jack O'Connell, Labor MLC for Melbourne Province, died. Labor candidate Ivan Trayling was elected unopposed at the resulting by-election on 9 June 1972.

== Sources ==
- "Find a Member". State Government of Victoria.
