= Members of the Victorian Legislative Council, 1964–1967 =

- ←1961–1964 1967–1970→

This is a list of members of the Victorian Legislative Council between 1964 and 1967. As half of the Legislative Council's terms expired at each triennial election, half of these members were elected at the 1961 state election with terms expiring in 1967, while the other half were elected at the 1964 state election with terms expiring in 1970.

Name	Party	Province	Term expires	Term of office
Keith Bradbury	Country	North Eastern	1967	1953–1978
Sir Percy Byrnes	Country	North Western	1970	1942–1969
Murray Byrne	Liberal	Ballarat	1970	1958–1976
Bill Campbell	Liberal	East Yarra	1967	1964–1983
Ian Cathie^{[1]}	Labor	South Eastern	1970	1964–1970
Hon Gilbert Chandler	Liberal	Southern	1967	1935–1973
Michael Clarke	Country	Northern	1970	1964–1976
Hon Pat Dickie	Liberal	Ballarat	1967	1956–1978
Doug Elliot	Labor	Melbourne	1967	1960–1979
Percy Feltham	Country/Independent	Northern	1967	1955–1967
John Galbally	Labor	Melbourne North	1967	1949–1979
Raymond Garrett	Liberal	Southern	1970	1958–1976
Charles Gawith	Liberal	Monash	1967	1955–1967
Stan Gleeson^{[2]}	Liberal	South Western	1967	1965–1979
Jock Granter	Liberal	Bendigo	1970	1964–1988
Thomas Grigg	Liberal	Bendigo	1967	1951–1967
Kenneth Gross	Liberal	Western	1970	1958–1976
Hon Rupert Hamer	Liberal	East Yarra	1970	1958–1971
Murray Hamilton^{[3]}	Liberal	Higinbotham	1970	1967–1982
Arthur Hewson	Country	Gippsland	1970	1964–1970
Alan Hunt	Liberal	South Eastern	1967	1961–1992
Alexander Knight	Labor	Melbourne West	1967	1963–1979
Hon Sir Gordon McArthur^{[2]}	Liberal	South Western	1967	1931–1965
Hon Ronald Mack	Liberal	Western	1967	1955–1968
Bill Mair^{[1]}	Liberal	South Eastern	1970	1958–1964
Arthur Mansell	Country	North Western	1967	1952–1973
Bob May	Country	Gippsland	1967	1957–1973
Samuel Merrifield	Labor	Doutta Galla	1970	1958–1970
Graham Nicol	Liberal	Monash	1970	1958–1976
Jack O'Connell	Labor	Melbourne	1970	1958–1972
Baron Snider^{[3]}	Liberal	Higinbotham	1970	1964–1966
Ivan Swinburne	Country	North Eastern	1970	1946–1976
Geoffrey Thom	Liberal	South Western	1970	1958–1970
Hon Lindsay Thompson	Liberal	Higinbotham	1967	1955–1970
Archie Todd	Labor	Melbourne West	1970	1958–1970
John Tripovich	Labor	Doutta Galla	1967	1960–1976
John Walton	Labor	Melbourne North	1970	1958–1982

^{1} On 30 August 1964, Bill Mair, Liberal MLC for South Eastern Province, died. Labor candidate Ian Cathie won the resulting by-election on 10 October 1964.
^{2} On 10 August 1965, Sir Gordon McArthur, Liberal MLC for South Western Province, died. Liberal candidate Stan Gleeson won the resulting by-election on 18 September 1965.
^{3} On 29 December 1966, Baron Snider, Liberal MLC for Higinbotham Province, died. Liberal candidate Murray Hamilton won the resulting by-election on 25 February 1967.

== Sources ==
- "Find a Member". State Government of Victoria.
