= Results of the 1961 Victorian state election (Legislative Council) =

Australian state election results

Victorian state election, 15 July 1961 Legislative Council << 1958–1964 >>
Enrolled voters	1,554,856				
Votes cast	1,467,482		Turnout	94.3	+8.0
Informal votes	46,697		Informal	3.2	+1.5
Summary of votes by party
Party	Primary votes	%	Swing	Seats won	Seats held
Labor	552,075	38.9	–0.3	4	9
Liberal and Country	538,013	37.9	+2.1	9	17
Democratic Labor	237,464	16.7	+1.8	0	0
Country	88,416	6.2	+0.7	4	8
Independent	4,817	0.3	+0.3	0	0
Total	1,420,785			17	34

This is a list of Legislative Council results for the Victorian 1961 state election. 17 of the 34 seats were contested.

== Results by province ==
=== Ballarat ===
1961 Victorian state election: Ballarat Province
Party	Candidate	Votes	%	±%
Labor	Jack Jones	22,663	42.3	−1.3
Liberal and Country	Pat Dickie	21,603	40.3	+0.6
Democratic Labor	William Bruty	9,368	17.5	+6.8
Total formal votes		53,634	98.0	−0.7
Informal votes		1,092	2.0	+0.7
Turnout		54,726	95.8	−0.1
Two-party-preferred result
Liberal and Country	Pat Dickie	30,105	56.1	+5.2
Labor	Jack Jones	23,529	43.9	−5.2
Liberal and Country hold		Swing	+5.2	

=== Bendigo ===
1961 Victorian state election: Bendigo Province
Party	Candidate	Votes	%	±%
Labor	Patrick McMahon	24,790	43.9	−4.2
Liberal and Country	Thomas Grigg	21,575	38.2	−0.5
Democratic Labor	William Drechsler	10,157	18.0	+4.8
Total formal votes		56,522	97.8	−1.2
Informal votes		1,266	2.2	+1.2
Turnout		57,788	96.2	+2.0
Two-party-preferred result
Liberal and Country	Thomas Grigg	30,506	54.0	+4.9
Labor	Patrick McMahon	26,016	46.0	−4.9
Liberal and Country hold		Swing	+4.9	

=== Doutta Galla ===
1961 Victorian state election: Doutta Galla Province
Party	Candidate	Votes	%	±%
Labor	John Tripovich	44,708	48.7	−4.3
Liberal and Country	Kenneth Jones	28,895	31.4	+0.3
Democratic Labor	Barry O'Brien	18,300	19.9	+3.9
Total formal votes		91,903	95.3	−2.8
Informal votes		4,489	4.7	+2.8
Turnout		96,392	93.6	+1.6
Two-party-preferred result
Labor	John Tripovich	46,391	50.5	−5.7
Liberal and Country	Kenneth Jones	45,512	49.5	+5.7
Labor hold		Swing	−5.7	

=== East Yarra ===
1961 Victorian state election: East Yarra Province
Party	Candidate	Votes	%	±%
Liberal and Country	Ewen Cameron	68,916	57.4	+8.4
Labor	Leo Bartley	33,083	27.6	+27.6
Democratic Labor	John Hoare	17,978	15.0	−3.4
Total formal votes		119,977	97.7	−0.3
Informal votes		2,859	2.3	+0.3
Turnout		122,836	93.4	+0.9
Two-party-preferred result
Liberal and Country	Ewen Cameron		70.9	
Labor	Leo Bartley		29.1	
Liberal and Country hold		Swing	N/A	

- Two party preferred vote was estimated.

=== Gippsland ===
1961 Victorian state election: Gippsland Province
Party	Candidate	Votes	%	±%
Country	Bob May	23,659	34.3	−21.8
Labor	George Evans	22,246	32.3	+2.4
Liberal and Country	Archie Tanner	13,328	19.3	+19.3
Democratic Labor	John Hansen	9,781	14.2	+0.2
Total formal votes		69,014	97.2	−1.5
Informal votes		2,005	2.8	+1.5
Turnout		71,019	94.4	+1.0
Two-party-preferred result
Country	Bob May	43,306	62.7	−4.6
Labor	George Evans	25,708	37.3	+4.6
Country hold		Swing	−4.6	

=== Higinbotham ===
1961 Victorian state election: Higinbotham Province
Party	Candidate	Votes	%	±%
Liberal and Country	Lindsay Thompson	57,948	52.1	−7.2
Labor	Eric Perryman	33,471	30.1	−4.8
Democratic Labor	Henry Moore	19,871	17.9	+17.9
Total formal votes		111,290	97.5	−0.7
Informal votes		2,885	2.5	+0.7
Turnout		114,175	94.1	+2.1
Two-party-preferred result
Liberal and Country	Lindsay Thompson		66.4	+4.1
Labor	Eric Perryman		33.6	−4.1
Liberal and Country hold		Swing	+4.1	

- Two party preferred vote was estimated.

=== Melbourne ===
1961 Victorian state election: Melbourne Province
Party	Candidate	Votes	%	±%
Labor	Doug Elliot	22,982	60.4	−8.3
Democratic Labor	Harold Powell	7,884	20.7	−10.6
Liberal and Country	Reginald Cannon	7,156	18.8	+18.8
Total formal votes		38,022	93.5	−3.0
Informal votes		2,650	6.5	+3.0
Turnout		40,672	90.4	+2.1
Two-candidate-preferred result
Labor	Doug Elliot		63.3	−5.4
Democratic Labor	Harold Powell		36.7	+5.4
Labor hold		Swing	−5.4	

- Two party preferred vote was estimated.

=== Melbourne North ===
1961 Victorian state election: Melbourne North Province
Party	Candidate	Votes	%	±%
Labor	John Galbally	70,736	52.2	−0.6
Liberal and Country	Alfred Carter	40,020	29.5	+1.3
Democratic Labor	Kevin Daniel	24,877	18.3	−0.7
Total formal votes		135,633	96.7	−1.5
Informal votes		4,533	3.3	+1.5
Turnout		140,166	95.0	+2.1
Two-party-preferred result
Labor	John Galbally		54.0	−2.6
Liberal and Country	Alfred Carter		46.0	+2.6
Labor hold		Swing	−2.6	

- Two party preferred vote was estimated.

=== Melbourne West ===
1961 Victorian state election: Melbourne West Province
Party	Candidate	Votes	%	±%
Labor	Buckley Machin	55,115	62.9	−8.4
Democratic Labor	Bert Bailey	20,055	22.9	−5.8
Liberal and Country	Dudley Coombes	12,511	14.3	+14.3
Total formal votes		87,681	95.6	−2.0
Informal votes		4,038	4.4	+2.0
Turnout		91,719	94.3	+1.9
Two-candidate-preferred result
Labor	Buckley Machin		64.3	−7.0
Democratic Labor	Bert Bailey		35.7	+7.0
Labor hold		Swing	−7.0	

- Two party preferred vote was estimated.

=== Monash ===
1961 Victorian state election: Monash Province
Party	Candidate	Votes	%	±%
Liberal and Country	Charles Gawith	39,572	48.8	−0.8
Labor	Frederick Levin	24,859	30.6	−0.1
Democratic Labor	Thomas Brennan	11,906	14.7	−5.0
Independent	Arthur Bennett	3,612	4.5	+4.5
Independent	Frank Power	1,205	1.5	+1.5
Total formal votes		81,154	94.6	−3.2
Informal votes		4,606	5.4	+3.2
Turnout		85,760	91.5	+2.2
Two-party-preferred result
Liberal and Country	Charles Gawith	53,769	66.3	−0.6
Labor	Frederick Levin	27,385	33.7	+0.6
Liberal and Country hold		Swing	−0.6	

=== Northern ===
1961 Victorian state election: Northern Province
Party	Candidate	Votes	%	±%
Country	Percy Feltham	21,107	42.3	−57.7
Labor	John Cameron	11,183	22.4	+22.4
Liberal and Country	Laurence Troy	11,089	22.2	+22.2
Democratic Labor	Bernard Hallinan	6,528	13.1	+13.1
Total formal votes		49,907	96.9	
Informal votes		1,569	3.1	
Turnout		51,476	96.4	
Two-party-preferred result
Country	Percy Feltham		73.4	−26.6
Labor	John Cameron		26.6	+26.6
Country hold		Swing	N/A	

- Two party preferred vote was estimated.

=== North Eastern ===
1961 Victorian state election: North Eastern Province
Party	Candidate	Votes	%	±%
Country	Keith Bradbury	21,469	45.9	−54.1
Labor	Lorne Collins	11,308	24.2	+24.2
Liberal and Country	Jim Plowman	7,412	15.8	+15.8
Democratic Labor	Arthur White	6,593	14.1	+14.1
Total formal votes		46,782	97.4	
Informal votes		1,263	2.6	
Turnout		48,045	95.1	
Two-candidate-preferred result
Country	Keith Bradbury	25,141	53.7	−46.3
Liberal and Country	Jim Plowman	21,641	46.3	+46.3
Country hold		Swing	N/A	

=== North Western ===
1961 Victorian state election: North Western Province
Party	Candidate	Votes	%	±%
Country	Arthur Mansell	22,181	51.1	−23.5
Labor	Thomas Gilhooley	8,472	19.5	+19.5
Liberal and Country	Geoffrey Harding	8,040	18.5	+18.5
Democratic Labor	Michael Howley	4,701	10.8	+10.8
Total formal votes		43,394	96.9	−1.5
Informal votes		1,399	3.1	+1.5
Turnout		44,793	95.9	+2.0
Two-party-preferred result
Country	Arthur Mansell		74.5	−0.1
Labor	Thomas Gilhooley		25.5	+25.5
Country hold		Swing	N/A	

- Two party preferred vote was estimated.

=== Southern ===
1961 Victorian state election: Southern Province
Party	Candidate	Votes	%	±%
Liberal and Country	Gilbert Chandler	89,181	45.6	−1.3
Labor	Stanley Willis	76,060	38.9	−2.9
Democratic Labor	Raymond Studham	30,194	15.5	+4.2
Total formal votes		195,435	96.9	−1.6
Informal votes		6,182	3.1	+1.6
Turnout		201,617	94.6	+2.2
Two-party-preferred result
Liberal and Country	Gilbert Chandler	115,846	59.3	+2.5
Labor	Stanley Willis	79,589	40.7	−2.5
Liberal and Country hold		Swing	+2.5	

=== South Eastern ===
1961 Victorian state election: South Eastern Province
Party	Candidate	Votes	%	±%
Liberal and Country	Alan Hunt	53,599	47.1	−3.6
Labor	Reginald Butler	42,836	37.6	+3.0
Democratic Labor	Martin Curry	17,442	15.3	+0.5
Total formal votes		113,877	97.4	−1.0
Informal votes		3,064	2.6	+1.0
Turnout		116,941	94.7	+2.1
Two-party-preferred result
Liberal and Country	Alan Hunt	68,216	59.9	−3.4
Labor	Reginald Butler	45,661	40.1	+3.4
Liberal and Country hold		Swing	−3.4	

=== South Western ===
1961 Victorian state election: South Western Province
Party	Candidate	Votes	%	±%
Liberal and Country	Gordon McArthur	33,000	45.4	−1.0
Labor	Stanley Nash	26,654	36.6	−4.9
Democratic Labor	Newell Barrett	13,102	18.0	+5.9
Total formal votes		72,756	97.4	−1.7
Informal votes		1,936	2.6	+1.7
Turnout		74,692	94.8	+1.2
Two-party-preferred result
Liberal and Country	Gordon McArthur	44,818	61.6	+4.9
Labor	Stanley Nash	27,938	38.4	−4.9
Liberal and Country hold		Swing	+4.9	

=== Western ===
1961 Victorian state election: Western Province
Party	Candidate	Votes	%	±%
Liberal and Country	Ronald Mack	24,168	44.9	−2.3
Labor	James McIntyre	20,909	38.9	−0.6
Democratic Labor	Geoffrey White	8,727	16.2	+2.9
Total formal votes		53,804	98.4	−0.8
Informal votes		861	1.6	+0.8
Turnout		54,665	96.4	+0.9
Two-party-preferred result
Liberal and Country	Ronald Mack	31,894	59.3	+1.6
Labor	James McIntyre	21,910	40.7	−1.6
Liberal and Country hold		Swing	+1.6	

== See also ==
- 1961 Victorian state election
- Candidates of the 1961 Victorian state election
- Members of the Victorian Legislative Council, 1961–1964
