= Results of the 1973 Victorian state election (Legislative Council) =

Australian state election results

Victorian state election, 19 May 1973 Legislative Council << 1970–1976 >>
Enrolled voters	2,088,984				
Votes cast	1,953,462		Turnout	93.5	–1.3
Informal votes	74,354		Informal	3.8	–0.2
Summary of votes by party
Party	Primary votes	%	Swing	Seats won	Seats held
Liberal	810,807	43.1	+5.5	11	21
Labor	766,181	40.8	–1.8	4	9
Democratic Labor	163,008	8.7	–5.4	0	0
Country	120,604	6.4	+0.3	3	6
Australia	18,508	1.0	+1.0	0	0
Total	1,879,108			18	36

This is a list of Legislative Council results for the Victorian 1973 state election. 18 of the 36 seats were contested.

== Results by Province ==
=== Ballarat ===
1973 Victorian state election: Ballarat Province
Party	Candidate	Votes	%	±%
Liberal	Vance Dickie	27,500	44.8	−3.0
Labor	Ronald Corbett	24,259	39.5	−0.1
Democratic Labor	William Griffin	5,317	8.6	−4.0
Country	Patrick Hope	4,318	7.0	+7.0
Total formal votes		61,394	97.1	−0.6
Informal votes		1,862	2.9	+0.6
Turnout		63,256	95.0	−0.9
Two-party-preferred result
Liberal	Vance Dickie	35,871	58.4	−1.1
Labor	Ronald Corbett	25,523	41.6	+1.1
Liberal hold		Swing	−1.1	

=== Bendigo ===
1973 Victorian state election: Bendigo Province
Party	Candidate	Votes	%	±%
Labor	Stewart Anderson	29,789	45.5	−1.5
Liberal	Fred Grimwade	29,725	45.4	+5.7
Democratic Labor	William Drechsler	5,905	9.0	−4.3
Total formal votes		65,419	97.5	−0.3
Informal votes		1,656	2.5	+0.3
Turnout		67,075	95.3	0.0
Two-party-preferred result
Liberal	Fred Grimwade	34,707	53.0	+2.0
Labor	Stewart Anderson	30,712	47.0	−2.0
Liberal hold		Swing	+2.0	

=== Boronia ===
1973 Victorian state election: Boronia Province
Party	Candidate	Votes	%	±%
Liberal	Peter Block	93,740	52.8	+9.1
Labor	Niall Brennan	72,120	40.6	−3.0
Democratic Labor	Cornelius Gleeson	11,612	6.5	−6.2
Total formal votes		177,472	97.0	+0.9
Informal votes		5,439	3.0	−0.9
Turnout		182,911	93.7	−2.0
Two-party-preferred result
Liberal	Peter Block		58.7	+4.3
Labor	Niall Brennan		41.3	−4.3
Liberal hold		Swing	+4.3	

- Two party preferred vote was estimated.

=== Doutta Galla ===
1973 Victorian state election: Doutta Galla Province
Party	Candidate	Votes	%	±%
Labor	John Tripovich	67,210	51.9	−2.8
Liberal	Frank Mott	43,441	33.5	+3.6
Democratic Labor	Hubert Evans	18,850	14.6	−0.8
Total formal votes		129,501	94.1	−0.2
Informal votes		8,132	5.9	+0.2
Turnout		137,633	93.7	0.0
Two-party-preferred result
Labor	John Tripovich		53.3	−2.9
Liberal	Frank Mott		46.7	+2.9
Labor hold		Swing	−2.9	

- Two party preferred vote was estimated.

=== East Yarra ===
1973 Victorian state election: East Yarra Province
Party	Candidate	Votes	%	±%
Liberal	Bill Campbell	68,336	58.5	+5.7
Labor	Rosslyn Ives	31,799	27.2	−7.1
Democratic Labor	Helen Hart	8,837	7.6	−5.3
Australia	Harold Jeffrey	7,765	6.7	+6.7
Total formal votes		116,737	97.2	+0.3
Informal votes		3,399	2.8	−0.3
Turnout		120,136	91.8	−1.3
Two-party-preferred result
Liberal	Bill Campbell		68.0	+3.4
Labor	Rosslyn Ives		32.0	−3.4
Liberal hold		Swing	+3.4	

- Two party preferred vote was estimated.

=== Gippsland ===
1973 Victorian state election: Gippsland Province
Party	Candidate	Votes	%	±%
Labor	Thomas Matthews	29,543	34.5	+1.4
Liberal	Dick Long	25,392	29.6	+3.2
Country	Bob May	22,663	26.4	−0.4
Democratic Labor	Gregory Answorth	8,114	9.5	−4.3
Total formal votes		85,712	97.0	+0.2
Informal votes		2,630	3.0	−0.2
Turnout		88,342	94.3	−0.4
Two-party-preferred result
Liberal	Dick Long	51,813	60.4	+17.9
Labor	Thomas Matthews	33,899	39.6	−17.9
Liberal gain from Country		Swing	N/A	

=== Higinbotham ===
1973 Victorian state election: Higinbotham Province
Party	Candidate	Votes	%	±%
Liberal	William Fry	68,273	55.6	+8.1
Labor	Henry Woodley	44,792	36.5	−3.2
Democratic Labor	Frederick Skinner	9,631	7.9	−4.9
Total formal votes		122,696	97.2	+0.2
Informal votes		3,524	2.8	−0.2
Turnout		126,220	93.6	−0.9
Two-party-preferred result
Liberal	William Fry		62.7	+3.6
Labor	Henry Woodley		37.3	−3.6
Liberal hold		Swing	+3.6	

- Two party preferred vote was estimated.

=== Melbourne ===
1973 Victorian state election: Melbourne Province
Party	Candidate	Votes	%	±%
Labor	Doug Elliot	54,457	55.8	+5.2
Liberal	John Walsh	34,878	35.7	+4.6
Democratic Labor	Gordon Haberman	8,299	8.5	−9.8
Total formal votes		97.634	93.9	+0.5
Informal votes		6,286	6.1	−0.5
Turnout		103,920	88.8	−2.3
Two-party-preferred result
Labor	Doug Elliot		57.2	+4.9
Liberal	John Walsh		42.8	−4.9
Labor hold		Swing	+4.9	

- Two party preferred vote was estimated.

=== Melbourne North ===
1973 Victorian state election: Melbourne North Province
Party	Candidate	Votes	%	±%
Labor	John Galbally	58,954	55.3	+0.9
Liberal	Richard Alston	35,617	33.4	+3.2
Democratic Labor	Christina Staunton	12,029	11.3	−4.1
Total formal votes		106,600	94.1	−0.4
Informal votes		6,639	5.9	+0.4
Turnout		113,239	94.1	−0.8
Two-party-preferred result
Labor	John Galbally		56.6	+0.7
Liberal	Richard Alston		43.4	−0.7
Labor hold		Swing	+0.7	

- Two party preferred vote was estimated.

=== Melbourne West ===
1973 Victorian state election: Melbourne West Province
Party	Candidate	Votes	%	±%
Labor	Alexander Knight	74,939	54.7	+0.8
Liberal	Neville Hudson	49,189	35.9	+7.7
Democratic Labor	Robin Thomas	12,874	9.4	−8.6
Total formal votes		137,002	93.9	−0.6
Informal votes		8,960	6.1	+0.6
Turnout		145,962	93.9	−1.0
Two-party-preferred result
Labor	Alexander Knight		55.6	0.0
Liberal	Neville Hudson		44.4	0.0
Labor hold		Swing	0.0	

- Two party preferred vote was estimated.

=== Monash ===
1973 Victorian state election: Monash Province
Party	Candidate	Votes	%	±%
Liberal	Charles Hider	67,463	56.7	+7.8
Labor	Jean McLean	42,857	36.0	+1.2
Democratic Labor	William Hoyne	8,679	7.3	−6.5
Total formal votes		118,999	96.6	+0.1
Informal votes		4,203	3.4	−0.1
Turnout		123,202	92.0	−0.1
Two-party-preferred result
Liberal	Charles Hider		63.3	−0.4
Labor	Jean McLean		36.7	+0.4
Liberal hold		Swing	−0.4	

- Two party preferred vote was estimated.

=== Northern ===
1973 Victorian state election: Northern Province
Party	Candidate	Votes	%	±%
Country	Stuart McDonald	28,726	47.7	+4.9
Liberal	Albert Baker	13,546	22.5	−0.3
Labor	John White	12,967	21.5	−0.6
Democratic Labor	John Ryan	5,012	8.3	−4.1
Total formal votes		60,251	96.6	+0.6
Informal votes		2,095	3.4	−0.6
Turnout		62,346	95.0	−1.3
After distribution of preferences
Country	Stuart McDonald	32,460	53.9	
Liberal	Albert Baker	14,115	23.4	
Labor	John White	13,676	22.7	
Country hold		Swing	N/A	

=== North Eastern ===
1973 Victorian state election: North Eastern Province
Party	Candidate	Votes	%	±%
Country	Keith Bradbury	26,331	47.7	+4.9
Labor	Edwin Ure	14,469	26.2	+1.0
Liberal	George Ikinger	9,929	18.0	−2.7
Democratic Labor	Maurice Smith	4,444	8.0	−4.4
Total formal votes		55,173	97.0	+0.6
Informal votes		1,710	3.0	−0.6
Turnout		56,883	94.2	−0.9
After distribution of preferences
Country	Keith Bradbury	29,718	53.9	
Labor	Edwin Ure	14,932	27.1	
Liberal	George Ikinger	10,523	19.1	
Country hold		Swing	N/A	

=== North Western ===
1973 Victorian state election: North Western Province
Party	Candidate	Votes	%	±%
Country	Ken Wright	18,440	40.1	−2.5
Labor	Margaret Davies	11,787	25.6	−1.3
Liberal	Heather Mitchell	11,303	24.6	+6.8
Democratic Labor	Stanley Croughan	4,470	9.7	−3.0
Total formal votes		46,000	96.8	+0.3
Informal votes		1,521	3.2	−0.3
Turnout		47,521	95.1	−0.9
Two-party-preferred result
Country	Ken Wright	31,060	67.5	−0.9
Labor	Margaret Davies	14,940	32.5	+0.9
Country hold		Swing	−0.9	

=== South Eastern ===
1973 Victorian state election: South Eastern Province
Party	Candidate	Votes	%	±%
Liberal	Alan Hunt	85,285	49.9	+8.6
Labor	David Bottomley	74,070	43.3	−3.5
Democratic Labor	John Dougherty	11,625	6.8	−5.1
Total formal votes		170,980	96.7	+0.2
Informal votes		5,813	3.3	−0.2
Turnout		176,793	93.7	−1.2
Two-party-preferred result
Liberal	Alan Hunt	93,819	54.9	+4.0
Labor	David Bottomley	77,161	45.1	−4.0
Liberal hold		Swing	+4.0	

=== South Western ===
1973 Victorian state election: South Western Province
Party	Candidate	Votes	%	±%
Liberal	Stan Gleeson	45,418	45.0	+6.1
Labor	Stanley Nash	40,179	39.8	−0.4
Democratic Labor	James Crockett	7,994	7.9	−6.5
Country	Gilbert Anderson	7,401	7.3	+0.8
Total formal votes		100,992	96.5	−0.4
Informal votes		3,681	3.5	+0.4
Turnout		104,673	94.3	−1.3
Two-party-preferred result
Liberal	Stan Gleeson	58,678	58.1	+3.3
Labor	Stanley Nash	42,314	41.9	−3.3
Liberal hold		Swing	+3.3	

=== Templestowe ===
1973 Victorian state election: Templestowe Province
Party	Candidate	Votes	%	±%
Liberal	Vasey Houghton	78,711	47.6	+5.9
Labor	Frederick Davis	62,586	37.8	−5.5
Democratic Labor	Christopher Curtis	13,418	8.1	−6.8
Australia	Geoffrey Loftus-Hills	10,743	6.5	+6.5
Total formal votes		165,458	96.8	−0.1
Informal votes		5,408	3.2	+0.1
Turnout		170,866	93.6	−1.3
Two-party-preferred result
Liberal	Vasey Houghton		58.4	+3.0
Labor	Frederick Davis		41.6	−3.0
Liberal hold		Swing	+3.0	

=== Western ===
1973 Victorian state election: Western Province
Party	Candidate	Votes	%	±%
Liberal	Digby Crozier	23,061	37.8	+3.8
Labor	Donald Grossman	19,404	31.8	+0.2
Country	Clive Mitchell	12,725	20.8	+0.6
Democratic Labor	Alan Beattie	5,898	9.7	−4.5
Total formal votes		61,088	97.8	+0.1
Informal votes		1,396	2.2	−0.1
Turnout		62,484	95.9	−0.9
Two-party-preferred result
Liberal	Digby Crozier	38,562	63.1	+8.2
Labor	Donald Grossman	22,526	36.9	−8.2
Liberal gain from Country		Swing	N/A	

== See also ==
- 1973 Victorian state election
- Candidates of the 1973 Victorian state election
- Members of the Victorian Legislative Council, 1973–1976
