= Results of the 1967 Victorian state election (Legislative Council) =

Australian state election results

Victorian state election, 29 April 1967 Legislative Council << 1964–1970 >>
Enrolled voters	1,723,981				
Votes cast	1,625,371		Turnout	94.3	–0.1
Informal votes	59,895		Informal	3.7	+0.7
Summary of votes by party
Party	Primary votes	%	Swing	Seats won	Seats held
Liberal	602,546	38.5	–1.6	10	18
Labor	577,613	36.9	+1.4	4	9
Democratic Labor	223,590	14.3	–1.2	0	0
Country	148,943	9.5	+0.6	4	8
Independent	12,784	0.8	+0.8	0	0
Total	1,565,476			18	35

This is a list of Legislative Council results for the Victorian 1967 state election. 18 of the 35 seats were contested.

== Results by province ==
=== Ballarat ===
1967 Victorian state election: Ballarat Province
Party	Candidate	Votes	%	±%
Liberal	Pat Dickie	22,970	41.4	
Labor	Kevin Healy	18,755	33.1	
Democratic Labor	James Burns	8,118	14.7	
Country	Robert Cooper	5,626	10.1	
Total formal votes		55,469	98.2	
Informal votes		1,515	1.8	
Turnout		56,984	96.3	
Two-party-preferred result
Liberal	Pat Dickie	34,227	61.8	
Labor	Kevin Healy	21,192	38.2	
Liberal hold		Swing		

=== Bendigo ===
1967 Victorian state election: Bendigo Province
Party	Candidate	Votes	%	±%
Labor	Kevin Curran	24,789	43.1	
Liberal	Fred Grimwade	17,223	29.9	
Country	Kenneth McLennan	8,572	14.9	
Democratic Labor	William Drechsler	6,991	12.1	
Total formal votes		57,575	97.5	
Informal votes		1,486	2.5	
Turnout		59,061	94.8	
Two-party-preferred result
Liberal	Fred Grimwade	28,849	50.1	
Labor	Kevin Curran	28,726	49.9	
Liberal hold		Swing		

=== Boronia ===
1967 Victorian state election: Boronia Province
Party	Candidate	Votes	%	±%
Liberal	Gilbert Chandler	59,278	50.9	
Labor	William French	41,882	36.0	
Democratic Labor	Frederick Rosenbrock	15,196	13.1	
Total formal votes		116,356	97.1	
Informal votes		3,529	2.9	
Turnout		119,885	93.4	
Two-party-preferred result
Liberal	Gilbert Chandler		62.7	
Labor	William French		37.3	
Liberal hold		Swing		

- Two party preferred vote was estimated.

=== Doutta Galla ===
1967 Victorian state election: Doutta Galla Province
Party	Candidate	Votes	%	±%
Labor	John Tripovich	53,073	49.8	
Liberal	Gabrielle Adams	36,831	34.5	
Democratic Labor	Alfred Gerrard	16,731	15.7	
Total formal votes		106,635	94.6	
Informal votes		6,140	5.4	
Turnout		112,775	93.5	
Two-party-preferred result
Labor	John Tripovich	54,784	51.4	
Liberal	Gabrielle Adams	51,851	48.6	
Labor hold		Swing		

=== East Yarra ===
1967 Victorian state election: East Yarra Province
Party	Candidate	Votes	%	±%
Liberal	Bill Campbell	61,857	56.9	
Labor	James Lawson	31,410	28.9	
Democratic Labor	John Rogers	15,491	14.2	
Total formal votes		108,758	97.0	
Informal votes		3,358	3.0	
Turnout		112,116	93.4	
Two-party-preferred result
Liberal	Bill Campbell		69.7	
Labor	James Lawson		30.3	
Liberal hold		Swing		

- Two party preferred vote was estimated.

=== Gippsland Province ===
1967 Victorian state election: Gippsland Province
Party	Candidate	Votes	%	±%
Country	Bob May	27,009	35.8	
Labor	Ivan Maddern	21,989	29.2	
Liberal	John Sullivan	14,818	19.7	
Democratic Labor	John Hansen	11,593	15.4	
Total formal votes		75,409	97.0	
Informal votes		2,337	3.0	
Turnout		77,746	94.8	
Two-party-preferred result
Country	Bob May	49,349	65.4	
Labor	Ivan Maddern	26,060	34.6	
Country hold		Swing		

=== Higinbotham ===
1967 Victorian state election: Higinbotham Province
Party	Candidate	Votes	%	±%
Liberal	William Fry	57,385	53.2	
Labor	Anthony Scarcella	36,071	33.4	
Democratic Labor	Ian Radnell	14,395	13.4	
Total formal votes		107,851	97.2	
Informal votes		3,119	2.8	
Turnout		110,970	94.0	
Two-party-preferred result
Liberal	William Fry		65.3	
Labor	Anthony Scarcella		34.7	
Liberal hold		Swing		

=== Melbourne ===
1967 Victorian state election: Melbourne Province
Party	Candidate	Votes	%	±%
Labor	Douglas Elliot	54,443	54.2	
Liberal	Norman Long	29,000	28.9	
Democratic Labor	Gordon Haberman	12,749	12.7	
Independent	Frederick Levin	4,245	4.2	
Total formal votes		100,437	93.9	
Informal votes		6,511	6.1	
Turnout		106,948	90.3	
Two-party-preferred result
Labor	Douglas Elliot		57.6	
Liberal	Norman Long		42.4	
Labor hold		Swing		

- Two party preferred was estimated.

=== Melbourne North ===
1967 Victorian state election: Melbourne North Province
Party	Candidate	Votes	%	±%
Labor	John Galbally	56,378	54.4	
Liberal	Walter Dale	32,176	31.1	
Democratic Labor	Joseph O'Leary	15,003	14.5	
Total formal votes		103,557	95.5	
Informal votes		4,908	4.5	
Turnout		108,465	95.2	
Two-party-preferred result
Labor	John Galbally		55.9	
Liberal	Walter Dale		44.1	
Labor hold		Swing		

- Two party preferred was estimated.

=== Melbourne West ===
1967 Victorian state election: Melbourne West Province
Party	Candidate	Votes	%	±%
Labor	Alexander Knight	60,703	57.9	
Liberal	Joseph Kadane	22,161	21.1	
Democratic Labor	Kenneth Berrie	21,996	21.0	
Total formal votes		104,860	94.2	
Informal votes		6,407	5.8	
Turnout		111,267	93.9	
Two-party-preferred result
Labor	Alexander Knight		60.0	
Liberal	Joseph Kadane		40.0	
Labor hold		Swing		

- Two party preferred was estimated.

=== Monash ===
1967 Victorian state election: Monash Province
Party	Candidate	Votes	%	±%
Liberal	Lindsay Thompson	57,009	52.2	
Labor	Graham Lacey	35,266	32.3	
Democratic Labor	William Hoyne	17,046	15.6	
Total formal votes		109,321	96.5	
Informal votes		3,977	3.5	
Turnout		113,298	92.9	
Two-party-preferred result
Liberal	Lindsay Thompson		65.3	
Labor	Graham Lacey		34.7	
Liberal hold		Swing		

=== Northern ===
1967 Victorian state election: Northern Province
Party	Candidate	Votes	%	±%
Country	Stuart McDonald	30,259	55.5	
Liberal	Laurence Troy	9,874	18.1	
Independent	Percy Feltham	8,539	15.7	
Democratic Labor	Peter Lawrence	5,822	10.7	
Total formal votes		54,494	96.5	
Informal votes		1,969	3.5	
Turnout		56,463	97.0	
Country hold		Swing		

- Preferences were not distributed.

=== North-Eastern ===
1967 Victorian state election: North-Eastern Province
Party	Candidate	Votes	%	±%
Country	Keith Bradbury	36,001	72.9	
Liberal	George Ikinger	7,140	14.5	
Democratic Labor	William Findlay	6,225	12.6	
Total formal votes		47,750	97.1	
Informal votes		1,456	2.9	
Turnout		50,822	95.3	
Country hold		Swing		

- Preferences were not distributed.

=== North-Western ===
1967 Victorian state election: North-Western Province
Party	Candidate	Votes	%	±%
Country	Arthur Mansell	22,435	50.9	
Labor	Bruce Phayer	8,816	20.0	
Liberal	Walter Scown	7,474	17.0	
Democratic Labor	Daniel Cooper	5,337	12.1	
Total formal votes		44,062	96.9	
Informal votes		1,369	3.1	
Turnout		45,431	95.9	
Two-party-preferred result
Country	Arthur Mansell		71.3	
Labor	Walter Scown		29.7	
Country hold		Swing		

- Two party preferred vote was estimated.

=== South-Eastern ===
1967 Victorian state election: South-Eastern Province
Party	Candidate	Votes	%	±%
Liberal	Alan Hunt	58,302	49.9	
Labor	Sydney Pargeter	43,866	37.5	
Democratic Labor	William Scantlebury	14,752	12.6	
Total formal votes		116,920	96.7	
Informal votes		3,972	3.3	
Turnout		120,282	94.9	
Two-party-preferred result
Liberal	Alan Hunt	70,418	60.2	
Labor	Sydney Pargeter	46,502	39.8	
Liberal hold		Swing		

=== South-Western ===
1967 Victorian state election: South Western Province
Party	Candidate	Votes	%	±%
Liberal	Stan Gleeson	33,889	41.2	
Labor	John Woolfe	29,710	36.2	
Democratic Labor	Gerald Gleeson	11,970	14.6	
Country	Christian Edwards	6,610	8.0	
Total formal votes		82,179	96.5	
Informal votes		2,952	3.5	
Turnout		85,131	94.9	
Two-party-preferred result
Liberal	Stan Gleeson	49,304	60.0	
Labor	John Woolfe	32,875	40.0	
Liberal hold		Swing		

=== Templestowe ===
1967 Victorian state election: Templestowe Province
Party	Candidate	Votes	%	±%
Liberal	Vasey Houghton	54,559	46.8	
Labor	Ian Stewart	45,597	39.1	
Democratic Labor	Leo Morison	16,549	14.2	
Total formal votes		116,705	97.1	
Informal votes		3,457	2.9	
Turnout		120,162	94.4	
Two-party-preferred result
Liberal	Vasey Houghton	69,224	59.3	
Labor	Ian Stewart	47,481	40.8	
Liberal hold		Swing		

=== Western ===
1967 Victorian state election: Western Province
Party	Candidate	Votes	%	±%
Liberal	Ronald Mack	20,600	37.1	
Labor	Edward Lewis	14,865	26.8	
Country	Linden Cameron	12,431	22.4	
Democratic Labor	Alan Beattie	7,626	13.7	
Total formal votes		55,522	97.5	
Informal votes		1,433	2.5	
Turnout		56,955	96.7	
Two-party-preferred result
Liberal	Ronald Mack	33,094	59.6	
Labor	Edward Lewis	22,428	40.4	
Liberal hold		Swing		

== See also ==
- 1967 Victorian state election
- Candidates of the 1967 Victorian state election
- Members of the Victorian Legislative Council, 1967–1970
