= Members of the Victorian Legislative Council, 1967–1970 =

- ←1964–1967 1970–1973→

This is a list of members of the Victorian Legislative Council between 1967 and 1970. As half of the Legislative Council's terms expired at each triennial election, half of these members were elected at the 1964 state election with terms expiring in 1970, while the other half were elected at the 1967 state election with terms expiring in 1973.

A redistribution in 1965 saw Southern Province abolished and Boronia and Templestowe created in its place. The redistribution was carried out in a staggered manner so that in this term, there was one MLC for each of the abolished and new provinces, with the redistribution becoming complete at the 1970 election.

Name	Party	Province	Term expires	Term of office
Keith Bradbury	Country	North Eastern	1973	1953–1978
Sir Percy Byrnes^{[2]}	Country	North Western	1970	1942–1969
Hon Murray Byrne	Liberal	Ballarat	1970	1958–1976
Bill Campbell	Liberal	East Yarra	1973	1964–1983
Ian Cathie	Labor	South Eastern	1970	1964–1970
Hon Gilbert Chandler	Liberal	Boronia	1973	1935–1973
Michael Clarke	Country	Northern	1970	1964–1976
Hon Vance Dickie	Liberal	Ballarat	1973	1956–1978
Bernie Dunn^{[2]}	Country	North Western	1970	1969–1988
Doug Elliot	Labor	Melbourne	1973	1960–1979
William Fry	Liberal	Higinbotham	1973	1967–1979
John Galbally	Labor	Melbourne North	1973	1949–1979
Raymond Garrett	Liberal	Southern	1970	1958–1976
Stan Gleeson	Liberal	South Western	1973	1965–1979
Jock Granter	Liberal	Bendigo	1970	1964–1988
Fred Grimwade	Liberal	Bendigo	1973	1967–1987
Kenneth Gross	Liberal	Western	1970	1958–1976
Hon Rupert Hamer	Liberal	East Yarra	1970	1958–1971
Murray Hamilton	Liberal	Higinbotham	1970	1967–1982
Arthur Hewson	Country	Gippsland	1970	1964–1970
Vasey Houghton	Liberal	Templestowe	1973	1967–1985
Hon Alan Hunt	Liberal	South Eastern	1973	1961–1992
Alexander Knight	Labor	Melbourne West	1973	1963–1979
Stuart McDonald	Country	Northern	1973	1967–1979
Hon Sir Ronald Mack^{[1]}	Liberal	Western	1973	1955–1968
Arthur Mansell	Country	North Western	1973	1952–1973
Bob May	Country	Gippsland	1973	1957–1973
Samuel Merrifield	Labor	Doutta Galla	1970	1958–1970
Clive Mitchell^{[1]}	Country	Western	1973	1968–1973
Graham Nicol	Liberal	Monash	1970	1958–1976
Jack O'Connell	Labor	Melbourne	1970	1958–1972
Ivan Swinburne	Country	North Eastern	1970	1946–1976
Geoffrey Thom	Liberal	South Western	1970	1958–1970
Hon Lindsay Thompson^{[4]}	Liberal	Monash	1973	1955–1970
Archie Todd	Labor	Melbourne West	1970	1958–1970
John Tripovich	Labor	Doutta Galla	1973	1960–1976
John Walton	Labor	Melbourne North	1970	1958–1982

^{1} On 12 February 1968, Ronald Mack, Liberal MLC for Western Province, died. Country candidate Clive Mitchell won the resulting by-election on 6 April 1968.
^{2} In September 1969, Sir Percy Byrnes, Country MLC for North Western, resigned. Country candidate Bernie Dunn won the resulting by-election on 15 November 1969.
^{3} In May 1970, Lindsay Thompson resigned to contest the seat of Malvern in the Legislative Assembly. A by-election was held concurrently with the 1970 state election, which was won by Liberal candidate Charles Hider.

== Sources ==
- "Find a Member". State Government of Victoria.
