= Members of the Victorian Legislative Council, 1958–1961 =

- ←1955–1958 1961–1964→

This is a list of members of the Victorian Legislative Council between 1958 and 1961. As half of the Legislative Council's terms expired at each triennial election, half of these members were elected at the 1955 triennial election with terms expiring in 1961, while the other half were elected at the 1958 triennial election with terms expiring in 1964.

Name	Party	Province	Term expires	Term of office
Keith Bradbury	Country	North Eastern	1961	1953–1978
Charles Bridgford	Liberal	South Eastern	1961	1955–1961
Percy Byrnes	Country	North Western	1964	1942–1969
Murray Byrne	Liberal	Ballarat	1964	1958–1976
Hon Ewen Paul Cameron	Liberal	East Yarra	1961	1948–1964
Hon Gilbert Chandler	Liberal	Southern	1961	1935–1973
Vance Dickie	Liberal	Ballarat	1961	1956–1978
Doug Elliot^{[1]}	Labor	Melbourne	1961	1960–1979
Percy Feltham	Country	Northern	1961	1955–1967
Bill Fulton	Country	Gippsland	1964	1953–1964
John Galbally	Labor	Melbourne North	1961	1949–1979
Raymond Garrett	Liberal	Southern	1964	1958–1976
Charles Gawith	Liberal	Monash	1961	1955–1967
Thomas Grigg	Liberal	Bendigo	1961	1951–1967
Kenneth Gross	Liberal	Western	1964	1958–1976
Rupert Hamer	Liberal	East Yarra	1964	1958–1971
Hon Sir Gordon McArthur	Liberal	South Western	1961	1931–1965
Buckley Machin	Labor	Melbourne West	1961	1955–1963
Ronald Mack	Liberal	Western	1961	1955–1968
Bill Mair	Liberal	South Eastern	1964	1958–1964
Arthur Mansell	Country	North Western	1961	1952–1973
Bob May	Country	Gippsland	1961	1957–1973
Samuel Merrifield	Labor	Doutta Galla	1964	1958–1970
Graham Nicol	Liberal	Monash	1964	1958–1976
Jack O'Connell	Labor	Melbourne	1964	1958–1972
Hon Bill Slater^{[2]}	Labor	Doutta Galla	1961	1949–1960
Arthur Smith	Labor	Bendigo	1964	1952–1964
Ivan Swinburne	Country	North Eastern	1964	1946–1976
Geoffrey Thom	Liberal	South Western	1964	1958–1970
Fred Thomas^{[1]}	Labor	Melbourne	1961	1948–1960
Hon Lindsay Thompson	Liberal	Higinbotham	1961	1955–1970
Archie Todd	Labor	Melbourne West	1964	1958–1970
John Tripovich^{[2]}	Labor	Doutta Galla	1961	1960–1976
Hon Sir Arthur Warner	Liberal	Higinbotham	1964	1946–1964
Dudley Walters	Country	Northern	1964	1946–1964
John Walton	Labor	Melbourne North	1964	1958–1982

^{1} On 2 June 1960, Fred Thomas, Labor MLC for Melbourne Province, died. Labor candidate Doug Elliot won the resulting by-election on 6 August 1960.
^{2} On 18 June 1960, Bill Slater, Labor MLC for Doutta Galla Province, died. Labor candidate John Tripovich won the resulting by-election on 6 August 1960.

== Sources ==
- "Find a Member". State Government of Victoria.
- Victorian Year Book 1958–61
