= Members of the Victorian Legislative Council, 1955–1958 =

- ←1952–1955 1958–1961→

This is a list of members of the Victorian Legislative Council between 1955 and 1958. As half of the Legislative Council's terms expired at each triennial election, half of these members were elected at the 1952 triennial election with terms expiring in 1958, while the other half were elected at the 1955 triennial election with terms expiring in 1961.

Name	Party	Province	Term expires	Term of office
David Arnott	Labor	Western	1958	1952–1958
Bert Bailey	Anti-Communist/DLP	Melbourne West	1958	1952–1958
Keith Bradbury	Country	North Eastern	1961	1953–1978
Thomas Brennan	Anti-Communist/DLP	Monash	1958	1952–1958
Charles Bridgford	Liberal and Country	South Eastern	1961	1955–1961
Percy Byrnes	Country	North Western	1958	1942–1969
Ewen Paul Cameron	Liberal and Country	East Yarra	1961	1948–1960
Gilbert Chandler	Liberal and Country	Southern	1961	1935–1973
Pat Dickie^{[1]}	Liberal and Country	Ballarat	1961	1956–1978
Sir Clifden Eager	Independent	East Yarra	1958	1930–1958
Percy Feltham	Country	Northern	1961	1955–1967
Don Ferguson	Labor	South Western	1958	1952–1958
Bill Fulton	Country	Gippsland	1958	1953–1964
John Galbally	Labor	Melbourne North	1961	1949–1979
Charles Gawith	Liberal and Country	Monash	1961	1955–1967
Thomas Grigg	Liberal and Country	Bendigo	1961	1951–1967
Jack Jones	Labor	Ballarat	1958	1952–1958
Paul Jones	Anti-Communist/DLP	Doutta Galla	1958	1938–1958
Jack Little	Anti-Communist/DLP	Melbourne North	1958	1954–1958
Herbert Ludbrook^{[1]}	Liberal and Country	Ballarat	1961	1949–1956
Gordon McArthur	Liberal and Country	South Western	1961	1931–1965
William MacAulay^{[2]}	Country	Gippsland	1961	1937–1957
Buckley Machin	Labor	Melbourne West	1961	1955–1963
Ronald Mack	Liberal and Country	Western	1961	1955–1968
Arthur Mansell	Country	North Western	1961	1952–1973
Bob May^{[2]}	Country	Gippsland	1961	1957–1973
Roy Rawson	Labor	Southern	1958	1952–1958
Pat Sheehy	Anti-Communist/DLP	Melbourne	1958	1952–1958
Hon Bill Slater	Labor	Doutta Galla	1961	1949–1960
Arthur Smith	Labor	Bendigo	1958	1952–1964
Ivan Swinburne	Country	North Eastern	1958	1946–1976
Fred Thomas	Labor	Melbourne	1961	1948–1960
Lindsay Thompson	Liberal and Country	Higinbotham	1961	1955–1970
George Tilley	Labor	South Eastern	1958	1952–1958
Dudley Walters	Country	Northern	1958	1946–1964
Arthur Warner	Liberal and Country	Higinbotham	1958	1946–1964

^{1} On 15 January 1956, Herbert Ludbrook, Liberal MLC for Ballarat Province, died. Liberal candidate Pat Dickie won the resulting by-election on 3 March 1956.
^{2} On 17 May 1957, William MacAulay, Country MLC for Gippsland Province, died. Country candidate Bob May won the resulting by-election on 29 June 1957.

== Sources ==
- "Find a Member". State Government of Victoria.
