= Members of the Victorian Legislative Council, 1973–1976 =

- ←1970–1973 1976–1979→

This is a list of members of the Victorian Legislative Council between 1973 and 1976. As half of the Legislative Council's terms expired at each triennial election, half of these members were elected at the 1970 state election with terms expiring in 1976, while the other half were elected at the 1973 state election with terms expiring in 1979.

Name	Party	Province	Term expires	Term of office
Peter Block	Liberal	Boronia	1979	1973–1985
Keith Bradbury	Country	North Eastern	1979	1953–1978
Hon Murray Byrne	Liberal	Ballarat	1976	1958–1976
Bill Campbell	Liberal	East Yarra	1979	1964–1983
Michael Clarke	Country	Northern	1976	1964–1976
Digby Crozier	Liberal	Western	1979	1973–1985
Hon Vance Dickie	Liberal	Ballarat	1979	1956–1978
Bernie Dunn	Country	North Western	1976	1969–1988
Dolph Eddy	Labor	Doutta Galla	1976	1970–1982
Doug Elliot	Labor	Melbourne	1979	1960–1979
Hon William Fry	Liberal	Higinbotham	1979	1967–1979
John Galbally	Labor	Melbourne North	1979	1949–1979
Raymond Garrett	Liberal	Templestowe	1976	1958–1976
Stan Gleeson	Liberal	South Western	1979	1965–1979
Jock Granter	Liberal	Bendigo	1976	1964–1988
Fred Grimwade	Liberal	Bendigo	1979	1967–1987
Kenneth Gross	Liberal	Western	1976	1958–1976
Vernon Hauser	Liberal	Boronia	1976	1970–1982
Murray Hamilton	Liberal	Higinbotham	1976	1967–1982
Charles Hider	Liberal	Monash	1979	1970–1979
Hon Vasey Houghton	Liberal	Templestowe	1979	1967–1985
Hon Alan Hunt	Liberal	South Eastern	1979	1961–1992
Glyn Jenkins	Liberal	South Western	1976	1970–1982
Eric Kent	Labor	Gippsland	1976	1970–1976, 1979–1985
Alexander Knight	Labor	Melbourne West	1979	1963–1979
Dick Long	Liberal	Gippsland	1979	1973–1992
Stuart McDonald	Country	Northern	1979	1967–1979
Graham Nicol	Liberal	Monash	1976	1958–1976
Haddon Storey	Liberal	East Yarra	1976	1971–1996
Ivan Swinburne	Country	North Eastern	1976	1946–1976
Bon Thomas	Labor	Melbourne West	1976	1970–1982
Ivan Trayling	Labor	Melbourne	1976	1972–1982
John Tripovich	Labor	Doutta Galla	1979	1960–1976
John Walton	Labor	Melbourne North	1976	1958–1982
Roy Ward	Liberal	South Eastern	1976	1970–1988
Ken Wright	Country	North Western	1979	1973–1992

== Sources ==
- "Find a Member". State Government of Victoria.
