= Electoral results for the East Yarra Province =

Victoria, Australia, district election results

This is a list of electoral results for the East Yarra Province in Victorian state elections.

== Members for East Yarra Province ==
Member 1	Party	Year	Member 2	Party
James Balfour	Unaligned	1904	Edward Miller	Unaligned
James Balfour	Unaligned	1907	Edward Miller	Unaligned
James Balfour	Unaligned	1910	Edward Miller	Unaligned
James Balfour	Unaligned	1913	Robert Beckett	Non-Labor
James Merritt	Non-Labor	1913	Robert Beckett	Non-Labor
James Merritt	Non-Labor	1916	Robert Beckett	Non-Labor
James Merritt	Nationalist	1917	William Edgar	Nationalist
James Merritt	Nationalist	1919	William Edgar	Nationalist
James Merritt	Nationalist	1922	William Edgar	Nationalist
James Merritt	Nationalist	1925	William Edgar	Nationalist
George Swinburne	Nationalist	1928	William Edgar	Nationalist
Robert Menzies	Nationalist	1928	William Edgar	Nationalist
Clifden Eager	Nationalist	1930	William Edgar	Nationalist
Clifden Eager	Nationalist	1931	William Edgar	Nationalist
Clifden Eager	United Australia	1931	William Edgar	United Australia
Clifden Eager	United Australia	1934	William Edgar	United Australia
Clifden Eager	United Australia	1937	William Edgar	United Australia
Clifden Eager	United Australia	1940	William Edgar	United Australia
Clifden Eager	United Australia	1943	William Edgar	United Australia
Clifden Eager	Liberal	1945	William Edgar	Liberal
Clifden Eager	Liberal	1946	William Edgar	Liberal
Clifden Eager	Liberal	1948	Ewen Cameron	Liberal
Clifden Eager	Liberal and Country	1949	Ewen Cameron	Liberal and Country
Clifden Eager	Liberal and Country	1949	Ewen Cameron	Liberal and Country
Clifden Eager	Independent	1952	Ewen Cameron	Liberal and Country
Clifden Eager	Independent	1955	Ewen Cameron	Liberal and Country
Dick Hamer	Liberal and Country	1958	Ewen Cameron	Liberal and Country
Dick Hamer	Liberal and Country	1961	Ewen Cameron	Liberal and Country
Dick Hamer	Liberal and Country	1964	Bill Campbell	Liberal and Country
Dick Hamer	Liberal and Country	1964	Bill Campbell	Liberal and Country
Dick Hamer	Liberal	1965	Bill Campbell	Liberal
Dick Hamer	Liberal	1967	Bill Campbell	Liberal
Dick Hamer	Liberal	1970	Bill Campbell	Liberal
Haddon Storey	Liberal	1971	Bill Campbell	Liberal
Haddon Storey	Liberal	1973	Bill Campbell	Liberal
Haddon Storey	Liberal	1976	Bill Campbell	Liberal
Haddon Storey	Liberal	1979	Bill Campbell	Liberal
Haddon Storey	Liberal	1982	Bill Campbell	Liberal
Haddon Storey	Liberal	1983	Mark Birrell	Liberal
Haddon Storey	Liberal	1985	Mark Birrell	Liberal
Haddon Storey	Liberal	1988	Mark Birrell	Liberal
Haddon Storey	Liberal	1992	Mark Birrell	Liberal
David Davis	Liberal	1996	Mark Birrell	Liberal
David Davis	Liberal	1999	Mark Birrell	Liberal
David Davis	Liberal	2002	Richard Dalla-Riva	Liberal

== Election results ==
=== Elections in the 2000s ===
2002 Victorian state election: East Yarra by-election
Party	Candidate	Votes	%	±%
Liberal	Richard Dalla-Riva	58,145	45.8	−11.0
Labor	Will Fowles	43,964	34.6	+1.8
Greens	Wendy Salter	21,096	16.6	+16.6
Democrats	Ari Sharp	3,805	3.0	−7.4
Total formal votes		127,010	97.0	−0.5
Informal votes		3,933	3.0	+0.5
Turnout		130,943	92.6	
Two-party-preferred result
Liberal	Richard Dalla-Riva	65,500	51.5	−8.8
Labor	Will Fowles	61,634	48.5	+8.8
Liberal hold		Swing	−8.8	

This election followed the vacancy caused by the resignation of Mark Birrell, who resigned. The by-election was conducted on the same day as the 2002 election, but used the old electoral boundaries.

2002 Victorian state election: East Yarra Province
Party	Candidate	Votes	%	±%
Liberal	David Davis	60,379	45.6	−10.8
Labor	Tom Wilson	47,741	36.1	+2.9
Greens	Peter Campbell	20,311	15.3	+15.3
Democrats	Kent Winzer	2,097	1.6	−8.8
Independent	Bill French	1,003	0.8	+0.8
Hope	Ronald Haack	792	0.6	+0.6
Total formal votes		132,323	96.4	−1.0
Informal votes		4,940	3.6	+1.0
Turnout		137,263	92.9	
Two-party-preferred result
Liberal	David Davis	66,304	50.1	−9.9
Labor	Tom Wilson	66,019	49.9	+9.9
Liberal hold		Swing	−9.9	

=== Elections in the 1990s ===
1999 Victorian state election: East Yarra Province
Party	Candidate	Votes	%	±%
Liberal	Mark Birrell	72,041	56.8	−0.5
Labor	Doug Walpole	41,644	32.8	+2.6
Democrats	Pierre Harcourt	13,236	10.4	+1.5
Total formal votes		126,921	97.5	−0.8
Informal votes		3,308	2.5	+0.8
Turnout		130,229	92.1	
Two-party-preferred result
Liberal	Mark Birrell	76,560	60.3	−1.9
Labor	Doug Walpole	50,356	39.7	+1.9
Liberal hold		Swing	−1.9	

1996 Victorian state election: East Yarra Province
Party	Candidate	Votes	%	±%
Liberal	David Davis	72,536	57.3	−6.2
Labor	Morley Muralitharan	38,297	30.2	+0.1
Democrats	Pierre Harcourt	11,372	9.0	+9.0
Natural Law	Lesley Mendelson	2,335	1.8	+1.8
Democratic Labor	John Murphy	2,130	1.7	−4.7
Total formal votes		126,670	98.3	+1.5
Informal votes		2,199	1.7	−1.5
Turnout		128,869	94.0	
Two-party-preferred result
Liberal	David Davis	78,558	62.2	−4.2
Labor	Morley Muralitharan	47,736	37.8	+4.2
Liberal hold		Swing	−4.2	

1992 Victorian state election: East Yarra Province
Party	Candidate	Votes	%	±%
Liberal	Mark Birrell	78,005	63.5	+5.5
Labor	Rosemary Barker	37,038	30.1	−11.8
Democratic Labor	Margaret Reed	7,840	6.4	+6.4
Total formal votes		122,883	96.8	+0.3
Informal votes		4,068	3.2	−0.3
Turnout		126,951	94.5	
Two-party-preferred result
Liberal	Mark Birrell	81,579	66.4	+8.4
Labor	Rosemary Barker	41,191	33.6	−8.4
Liberal hold		Swing	+8.4	

=== Elections in the 1980s ===
1988 Victorian state election: East Yarra Province
Party	Candidate	Votes	%	±%
Liberal	Haddon Storey	62,522	60.3	+2.3
Labor	Terry Monagle	41,217	39.7	+5.4
Total formal votes		103,739	96.6	−1.1
Informal votes		3,604	3.4	+1.1
Turnout		107,343	90.8	−1.2
Liberal hold		Swing	−1.5	

1985 Victorian state election: East Yarra Province
Party	Candidate	Votes	%	±%
Liberal	Mark Birrell	63,782	58.0	
Labor	Bernard Ziegenbein	37,766	34.3	
Democrats	Margaret Cole	8,490	7.7	
Total formal votes		110,038	97.7	
Informal votes		2,616	2.3	
Turnout		112,654	92.0	
Two-party-preferred result
Liberal	Mark Birrell	68,003	61.8	+4.4
Labor	Bernard Ziegenbein	42,035	38.2	−4.4
Liberal hold		Swing	+3.4	

1983 East Yarra Province state by-election
Party	Candidate	Votes	%	±%
Liberal	Mark Birrell	48,460	56.9	+3.2
Labor	Bob Ives	34,549	40.6	+4.5
Independent	Isaac Lahav	2,100	2.5	+2.5
Total formal votes		85,109	98.6	+0.8
Informal votes		1,252	1.4	−0.8
Turnout		86,361	79.4	−13.3
Two-party-preferred result
Liberal	Mark Birrell		58.1	+0.2
Labor	Bob Ives		41.9	−0.2
Liberal hold		Swing	+0.2	

- This by-election was caused by the resignation of Bill Campbell. Two party preferred result was estimated.

1982 Victorian state election: East Yarra Province
Party	Candidate	Votes	%	±%
Liberal	Haddon Storey	52,671	53.7	−2.6
Labor	Doug Walpole	35,442	36.1	+3.4
Democrats	Keith Bruckner	9,985	10.2	−0.9
Total formal votes		98,098	97.8	+0.2
Informal votes		2,165	2.2	−0.2
Turnout		100,263	92.7	+1.2
Two-party-preferred result
Liberal	Haddon Storey		57.9	−4.5
Labor	Doug Walpole		42.1	+4.5
Liberal hold		Swing	−4.5	

- Two party preferred vote was estimated.

=== Elections in the 1970s ===
1979 Victorian state election: East Yarra Province
Party	Candidate	Votes	%	±%
Liberal	Bill Campbell	56,302	56.3	−8.5
Labor	Jeanne Hendy	32,679	32.7	−2.5
Democrats	Michael McBride	11,075	11.1	+11.1
Total formal votes		100,056	97.6	−0.1
Informal votes		2,483	2.4	+0.1
Turnout		102,539	91.5	−0.3
Liberal hold		Swing	N/A	

- Preferences were not distributed.

1976 Victorian state election: East Yarra Province
Party	Candidate	Votes	%	±%
Liberal	Haddon Storey	66,998	64.8	
Labor	Robert Gurry	36,306	35.2	
Total formal votes		103,304	97.7	
Informal votes		2,428	2.3	
Turnout		105,732	91.8	
Liberal hold		Swing		

1973 Victorian state election: East Yarra Province
Party	Candidate	Votes	%	±%
Liberal	Bill Campbell	68,336	58.5	+5.7
Labor	Rosslyn Ives	31,799	27.2	−7.1
Democratic Labor	Helen Hart	8,837	7.6	−5.3
Australia	Harold Jeffrey	7,765	6.7	+6.7
Total formal votes		116,737	97.2	+0.3
Informal votes		3,399	2.8	−0.3
Turnout		120,136	91.8	−1.3
Two-party-preferred result
Liberal	Bill Campbell		68.0	+3.4
Labor	Rosslyn Ives		32.0	−3.4
Liberal hold		Swing	+3.4	

- Two party preferred vote was estimated.

1971 East Yarra Province state by-election
Party	Candidate	Votes	%	±%
Liberal	Haddon Storey	51,415	55.6	+2.8
Labor	Stanley Bannan	23,749	25.7	−9.6
Defence of Government Schools	Lancelot Hutchinson	8,886	9.6	+9.6
Independent	Dorothy Buchanan	7,544	8.2	+8.2
Independent	I J Mackay	869	0.9	+0.9
Total formal votes		92,463	97.5	+0.6
Informal votes		2,336	2.5	−0.6
Turnout		94,799	79.3	−13.8
Two-party-preferred result
Liberal	Haddon Storey		61.8	−2.8
Labor	Stanley Bannan		38.2	+2.8
Liberal hold		Swing	−2.8	

- This by-election was caused by the resignation of Rupert Hamer, who successfully contested the 1971 Kew state by-election to move to the Lower House upon being elected as leader of the Liberal party. The two party preferred margin was estimated.

1970 Victorian state election: East Yarra Province
Party	Candidate	Votes	%	±%
Liberal	Rupert Hamer	57,786	52.8	−4.1
Labor	Stanley Bannan	37,645	34.3	+5.5
Democratic Labor	John Rogers	14,083	12.9	−1.3
Total formal votes		109,514	96.9	−0.1
Informal votes		3,468	3.1	+0.1
Turnout		112,982	93.1	−0.3
Two-party-preferred result
Liberal	Rupert Hamer		64.4	−5.3
Labor	Stanley Bannan		35.6	+5.3
Liberal hold		Swing	−5.3	

- Two party preferred vote was estimated.

=== Elections in the 1960s ===
1967 Victorian state election: East Yarra Province
Party	Candidate	Votes	%	±%
Liberal	Bill Campbell	61,857	56.9	
Labor	James Lawson	31,410	28.9	
Democratic Labor	John Rogers	15,491	14.2	
Total formal votes		108,758	97.0	
Informal votes		3,358	3.0	
Turnout		112,116	93.4	
Two-party-preferred result
Liberal	Bill Campbell		69.7	
Labor	James Lawson		30.3	
Liberal hold		Swing		

- Two party preferred vote was estimated.

1964 Victorian state election: East Yarra Province
Party	Candidate	Votes	%	±%
Liberal and Country	Rupert Hamer	73,387	59.7	+2.3
Labor	John Paterson	33,075	26.9	−0.7
Democratic Labor	John Hoare	16,508	13.4	−1.6
Total formal votes		122,970	97.7	−0.1
Informal votes		2,883	2.3	+0.1
Turnout		125,853	93.2	−3.0
Two-party-preferred result
Liberal and Country	Rupert Hamer		71.8	+0.9
Labor	John Paterson		28.2	−0.9
Liberal and Country hold		Swing	+0.9	

1964 East Yarra Province state by-election
Party	Candidate	Votes	%	±%
Liberal and Country	Bill Campbell	70,383	67.2	+9.8
Independent	C Calderwood	21,115	20.2	+20.2
Independent	Geoffrey Broomhall	6,936	6.6	+6.6
Independent	John Murray	6,294	6.0	+6.0
Total formal votes		104,728	96.2	−1.5
Informal votes		4,132	3.8	+1.5
Turnout		108,860	80.6	−12.8
Liberal and Country hold		Swing	N/A	

- This by-election was caused by the death of Ewen Cameron. Preferences were not distributed.

1961 Victorian state election: East Yarra Province
Party	Candidate	Votes	%	±%
Liberal and Country	Ewen Cameron	68,916	57.4	+8.4
Labor	Leo Bartley	33,083	27.6	+27.6
Democratic Labor	John Hoare	17,978	15.0	−3.4
Total formal votes		119,977	97.7	−0.3
Informal votes		2,859	2.3	+0.3
Turnout		122,836	93.4	+0.9
Two-party-preferred result
Liberal and Country	Ewen Cameron		70.9	
Labor	Leo Bartley		29.1	
Liberal and Country hold		Swing	N/A	

- Two party preferred vote was estimated.

=== Elections in the 1950s ===
Victorian Legislative Council election, 1958: East Yarra Province
Party	Candidate	Votes	%	±%
Liberal and Country	Rupert Hamer	57,238	49.0	−6.2
Independent	Clifden Eager	38,055	32.6	+32.6
Democratic Labor	John Hoare	21,495	18.4	+8.3
Total formal votes		116,788	98.0	+0.1
Informal votes		2,350	2.0	−0.1
Turnout		119,138	92.5	+1.1
Two-candidate-preferred result
Liberal and Country	Rupert Hamer	75,174	64.4	
Independent	Clifden Eager	41,614	35.6	
Liberal and Country gain from Independent		Swing	N/A	
