= Balwyn High School =

Location
- Buchanan Avenue, Balwyn North; Melbourne, Victoria, 3104; Australia; 37°47′54″S 145°04′33″E

Information
- Other names: BHS, Balwyn High
- Type: State school
- Motto: Latin: Constanter ac Fideliter (Constantly and Faithfully)
- Established: 1954; 72 years ago
- Principal: Deborah Harman
- Years: 7 to 12
- Gender: Co-educational
- Enrollment: 2,100+
- Colours: Navy blue, gold, bottle green
- Mascot: Lion
- Publication: The Lion (fortnightly online newsletter)
- Yearbook: The Buchanan
- School Song
- Website: www.balwynhs.vic.edu.au

Balwyn High School is a state-run high school (years 7–12) in the Melbourne suburb of North Balwyn, in Victoria, Australia. It was established in 1954. As of December 2024, it had 2184 students, making it among the largest secondary schools in Victoria. Since 2009, the school has been led by Principal Deborah Harman.

The postwar student population expanded. The school assembly hall was built with assistance from parents and is named after a former principal, Archibald M. Rogers. With the large class sizes of that era, the school developed a science education at senior levels that saw graduates pass into senior academic, government and private sector positions.

The school buildings were rebuilt in 1994 after merging with Greythorn High School. Since 1996, the school has housed international students as a part of their international student program.

== Academic achievements ==
In 2006 the median ENTER (precursor and equivalent to the current ATAR) was 85.70, 40.06% achieved an ENTER at or above 90 and 5.07% achieved an ENTER at or above 99. In 2004, 55 students attained ENTER scores in excess of 97 and the median ENTER was 86.95.

According to Better Education, Balwyn High School was ranked eighth out of all state secondary schools in Victoria based on VCE results in 2024. Through using statistics gathered from the VCE Honour Roll and elsewhere, Better Education found that in 2016, 22% of VCE students obtained a score above 40 and the median study score was 34; by 2024, these figures had decreased to 14.7% and 32, respectively. In 2025 61 students achieved an ATAR of 97 and above to be featured on the Honour Roll. 40% of the 400 Class of 2025 students achieved an ATAR of 90 and above. The median study score was 33 and 19.2% of study scores were 40 and above.

== Extracurricular programmes ==
The school runs co-curricular programmes, including music, sport, debating, cheerleading and community programs. Its music programme, which comprises many string orchestras, includes A-Strings (Beginner), Junior Strings (Junior), Intermediate Strings, Newitt Strings (Second Most Advanced) and Senior Strings (Most Advanced), concert bands Training (Beginner), Novice, Junior, Intermediate and Symphony (most advanced), choirs, stage bands, a full symphony orchestra, a smaller chamber orchestra and many other privately formed smaller groups.

Its chess teams have consistently reached state-level competitions, while the school's cheerleading squad, the Skyraiders, earned two gold medals in Pom and Stunt and finished second (Level 2 Cheerleading/Scholastic) at the 2007 National Cheerleading Championships.

== Sport ==
Balwyn High School has a sports faculty. It has many interschool sport teams representing the school in numerous sports, some at elite levels, like many other schools around Victoria.

== International Students Program ==
Balwyn High School runs an 'International Students Program'. In 2017, there were 100 international students at Balwyn High School, who pay $20,000 per year, compared with the local students' voluntary school fees of around $900 per year. Balwyn earned $1 million from those international students in 2017.

== Student services ==
Balwyn High School maintains staff including psychologists, counsellors, chaplain, and administrative staff for students' mental health and wellbeing.

== Other ==
The school has four houses – Wurun, Galada, Ngawan and Karawun (prior to 2025 named Churchill, Strathmore, Windsor and Edinburgh). It also introduced a "Safe School Policy" in 2008 against cyber-bullying. In 2009, the Victorian Budget 2009–2010 has allowed the school to commence "Stage 3" building project which will include art facilities and the replacement of two old blocks. The state government also allocated at that time $11.2 million for "school modernisation" in of the facilities.

== Notable alumni ==
- Peter Cullen – water scientist
- Steve Hooker – Olympic pole-vaulter
- Malcolm Speed – former CEO of ICC and Australian Cricket Board
- Connor Downie – Hawthorn Hawks player
- Robert Richter – Australian barrister
- Ramona Koval - broadcaster, writer and journalist
- Thomas Sewell – leader of the far-right White nationalist extremist groups National Socialist Network and European Australian Movement
- Reuben Kaye - Award winning comedian, singer, writer, podacaster, drag artist and cabaret performer.
- Lucy Bartholomew - Professional trail runner
