= Kaye Darveniza =

Australian politician (born 1955)

Member of the Victorian Legislative Council
- In office 18 September 1999 – 25 November 2006 Serving with Sang Nguyen
- Constituency: Melbourne West Province

Member of the Victorian Legislative Council
- In office 25 November 2006 – 29 November 2014
- Constituency: Northern Victoria Region

Personal details
- Born: 15 February 1955 (age 71) Mooroopna, Victoria
- Party: Labor Party
- Relations: Gail Gago (sister); Peter Gago (brother-in-law)
- Occupation: Nurse

Kaye Mary Darveniza (born 15 February 1955) is an Australian politician. She was a Labor Party member of the Victorian Legislative Council from 1999 to 2014, first representing Melbourne West Province. In the 2006 Victoria State election, she transferred to the Northern Victoria Region and was re-elected.

Darveniza was born in the town of Mooroopna and educated in Shepparton. She studied nursing, becoming a registered psychiatric nurse in 1975. She then left the workforce for six years, before returning in 1981. In 1986, Darveniza became involved with the trade union movement, becoming an organiser with the Health and Community Services Union. Three years later, she rose to become the union's state secretary—a position she held for ten years, until her election to parliament. She also acted as the national president of the Hospital Employees Federation of Australia from 1990 to 1991, and as the national vice president of the Health Services Union of Australia from 1991 to 1999.

At the 1999 state election, Darveniza shifted from the union movement into politics, winning Labor preselection for the seat of Melbourne West Province. After Labor won a surprise victory, the newly elected Darveniza was given a parliamentary secretary position. In her first term in office, she also served on both the Economic Development Committee and the Legislative Council Printing Committee from 1999 to 2002.

Darveniza is the sister of South Australian Labor MP Gail Gago.

Darveniza is a member of the Labor Unity faction.
