= Greythorn High School =

Coordinates: 37°47′31.5″S 145°05′54.5″E

Location
- Greythorn Road, Balwyn North; Melbourne, Victoria, 3104; Australia

Information
- Other names: GHS, Greythorn High, Greythorn Thorns
- Type: State school
- Motto: Latin: Ne quid nimis ("all things in moderation")
- Established: 1958
- Closed: 1992 (merged)
- Years: 7 to 12
- Gender: Co-educational
- Enrollment: None. School is now closed
- Colours: Red and Green

Greythorn High School was a state-run high school (years 7–12) in the suburb of Balwyn North, in Melbourne, Victoria, Australia. The school was established in February 1958, meeting for the first time at Balwyn High School as the new building at Greythorn Road was not completed at that time. After three days, the 81 students and 5 teachers transferred to temporary premises at St Silas Hall and the Scout Hall at Macleay Park. The school moved to the permanent Greythorn Road site in June 1958. The school was officially opened on Saturday 4 June 1960 by the Minister for Education, J. S. Bloomfield, MLA.

During the 1970s and 1980s the school had over 1,000 students and over 100 staff.

It was used for the filming of the children's series, Pugwall.

Student numbers dwindled during the 1990s. As from January 1992, the school merged with Balwyn High School which then operated the Greythorn Road site as a campus for year 9 and year 11 students. The Greythorn Road campus was closed in 1994 by the Kennett Government. The buildings were eventually demolished and the land converted to a new housing estate.

The school had a library and extensive sport facilities, including two large ovals.

The school was well known for teaching drama and producing school plays and musicals, with students such as Mary Coustas and Kate Ceberano moving on to successful careers in drama and music.

== Principals ==
- J Guthrie 1958–1961
- R Hodge 1962–1963
- E Cochrem 1964–1969
- J McLennan 1969–1982
- G Sullivan 1983–1986
- G Kingsland 1987–1991

G Rogerson was Acting Principal for a number of years during McLennan's period of illness. E Cochrem was also Principal between 1971 & 1973.

== Notable teachers ==
- Margaret Ray – teacher at Greythorn 1968–81 and Victorian State Politician
- Robert Ewins – teacher at Greythorn 1967–68

== Alumni ==
- Mary Coustas, 1977 – comedian and actor (stage name "Effie")
- Kate Ceberano, 1979 – singer
- Sang Nguyen – Victorian politician
- Steve Foley – Olympic Diver
