= Joan Kirner =

Premier of Victoria from 1990 to 1992

The Honourable Joan Kirner AC
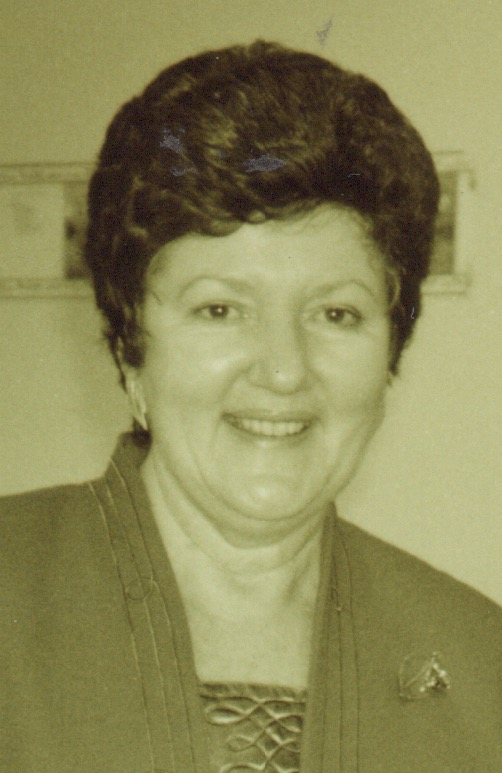
- Kirner in 1991

42nd Premier of Victoria
- In office 10 August 1990 – 6 October 1992
- Monarch: Elizabeth II
- Governor: Davis McCaughey; Richard McGarvie
- Deputy: Jim Kennan
- Preceded by: John Cain Jr.
- Succeeded by: Jeff Kennett

22nd Deputy Premier of Victoria
- In office 7 February 1989 – 10 August 1990
- Premier: John Cain Jr.
- Preceded by: Robert Fordham
- Succeeded by: Jim Kennan

Leader of the Opposition of Victoria
- In office 6 October 1992 – 22 March 1993
- Premier: Jeff Kennett
- Deputy: Jim Kennan
- Preceded by: Jeff Kennett
- Succeeded by: Jim Kennan

Leader of the Labor Party in Victoria
- In office 9 August 1990 – 22 March 1993
- Deputy: Jim Kennan
- Preceded by: John Cain Jr.
- Succeeded by: Jim Kennan

Member of the Victorian Legislative Assembly for Williamstown
- In office 1 October 1988 – 27 May 1994
- Preceded by: Gordon Stirling
- Succeeded by: Steve Bracks

Member of the Victorian Legislative Council for Melbourne West
- In office 3 April 1982 – 30 September 1988
- Preceded by: Bon Thomas
- Succeeded by: Licia Kokocinski

Personal details
- Born: Joan Elizabeth Hood; 20 June 1938 Essendon, Victoria, Australia
- Died: 1 June 2015 (aged 76) Melbourne, Victoria, Australia
- Party: Labor
- Spouse: Ronald George Kirner (m. 1960)
- Children: Michael, Kate and David
- Education: University of Melbourne
- Profession: Teacher
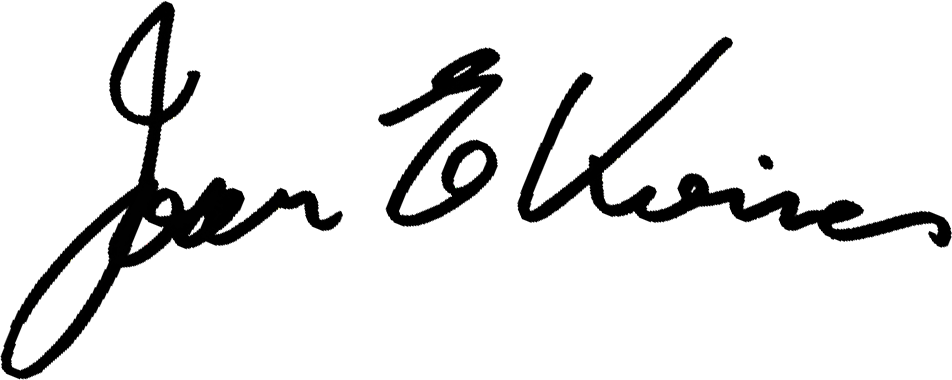
- Signature

Joan Elizabeth Kirner (née Hood; 20 June 1938 – 1 June 2015) was an Australian politician and teacher who served as 42nd premier of Victoria from 1990 to 1992 and leader of the Victorian Labor Party from 1990 to 1993. She was the member of the Legislative Council for the district of Melbourne West from 1982 to 1988, and a member of the Legislative Assembly (MP) for the district of Williamstown from 1988 to 1994. Kirner was the first woman to serve as Victorian premier, and the third woman in Australia to be the head of a state government.

== Early life and career ==
Born Joan Elizabeth Hood in Essendon, Melbourne, the only child of John Keith and Beryl Edith (née Cole) Hood, a fitter and turner and music teacher, respectively, Kirner was educated at state and private schools. She graduated in arts from the University of Melbourne, and completed a teaching qualification. She taught in state schools and became active in school and parents' organisations. In 1960 she married Ron Kirner, with whom she had three children. She was President of the Victorian Federation of States School Parents' Clubs, an influential education lobby from 1971 to 1977 and its executive officer from 1978 to 1982. She was appointed to several government advisory bodies on education.

== Entry into state politics ==
Kirner joined the Labor Party in 1978 and became a member of its Socialist Left faction. In 1982, she was elected as a Labor member of the Victorian Legislative Council, the upper house of the Victorian Parliament. In 1985, she was elected to the Cabinet of John Cain Jr.'s Labor government and became Minister for Conservation, Forests and Lands. She proposed the Flora and Fauna Guarantee Act 1988, the first Australian legislation, which gave legal protection to rare species. While Minister, and in association with Heather Mitchell from the Victorian Farmers' Federation, Kirner was instrumental in the formation of the first Landcare groups.

At the 1988 election, Kirner shifted to the Legislative Assembly, becoming MP for Williamstown, and was promoted to the Education portfolio. In this portfolio, Kirner carried out a series of controversial reforms aimed at reducing what Kirner saw as the class-based inequity of the education system, culminating in a new system of assessment, the Victorian Certificate of Education.

== Premiership ==
Later in 1988 Kirner was elected deputy leader of the party and became Deputy Premier of Victoria. When Cain resigned after a collapse in his political support in August 1990, Kirner was elected Labor leader and thus became Victoria's first female Premier. By this time the Labor government was in deep crisis, with some of the state's financial institutions on the brink of insolvency, the budget deficit unsustainably high and growing and the Labor Party deeply divided on how to respond to the situation. The party hoped that the elevation of a popular woman as its new leader would improve its position, but Kirner never succeeded in gaining control of the crisis into which the state had plunged. The conservative-leaning Melbourne newspaper, the Herald Sun, reacted unfavourably to a Premier from the Socialist Left, dubbing her "Mother Russia". She was lampooned alternatively as a sinister commissar and as a frumpy housewife in a polka-dot dress. She seemed unfazed by the Herald Sun and gradually won some respect, though she was unable to improve the government's standing significantly.

During 1991 and 1992, Kirner made several decisions to cut government spending and raise revenue to some extent, however her government failed to cut spending in many areas including education. Most of the Kirner Government attempts to cut spending were actively opposed by trade unions and some members of the government. The interest bill alone was $3.5 billion per year, the government sold off trains and trams and leased them back. Another decision was the sale of the state-owned State Bank of Victoria to the Commonwealth Bank in 1991.

Kirner went into 1992 knowing she faced a statutory general election, one which opinion polls gave her virtually no chance of winning. She waited as long as she could, finally calling an election for October. It was obvious as soon as the writs were dropped that Labor would not win a fourth term. Although she remained personally more popular than the Liberal Opposition Leader, Jeff Kennett, it was not nearly enough to overcome Victorians' growing anger at Labor. The Coalition's "Guilty Party" campaign did much to stoke this anger, targeting many Ministers in the Kirner Government and providing examples of concerns in their portfolios.

The campaign attracted controversy with ALP ads stating that if the Liberals won the election it would institute the same policies that were implemented in New Zealand by the then Fourth National Government. New Zealand Prime Minister Jim Bolger responded in reference to the campaign, "You know, they say that the show’s never over until the fat lady sings. Well, I think it was her we heard warming up in the wings this week".

The "fat lady" was in reference to Kirner being overweight. Bolger refused to apologise for this remark citing that he himself was overweight and did not want to make "an international incident" out of it. It did, however, anger women from Bolger's own National Party.

The Coalition won the election in a landslide, scoring a 19-seat swing—the second-worst defeat that a sitting government has ever suffered in Victoria. The Liberals actually won enough seats that they could have governed in their own right. Kirner remained Opposition Leader for a short period before resigning. She retired from Parliament in 1994 and was succeeded by one of her former aides for the electorate of Williamstown, future premier Steve Bracks.

A portrait of Kirner painted by Adelaide artist Annette Bezor in 1994 hangs in Queen's Hall at Parliament House Victoria.

== Life after Parliament ==
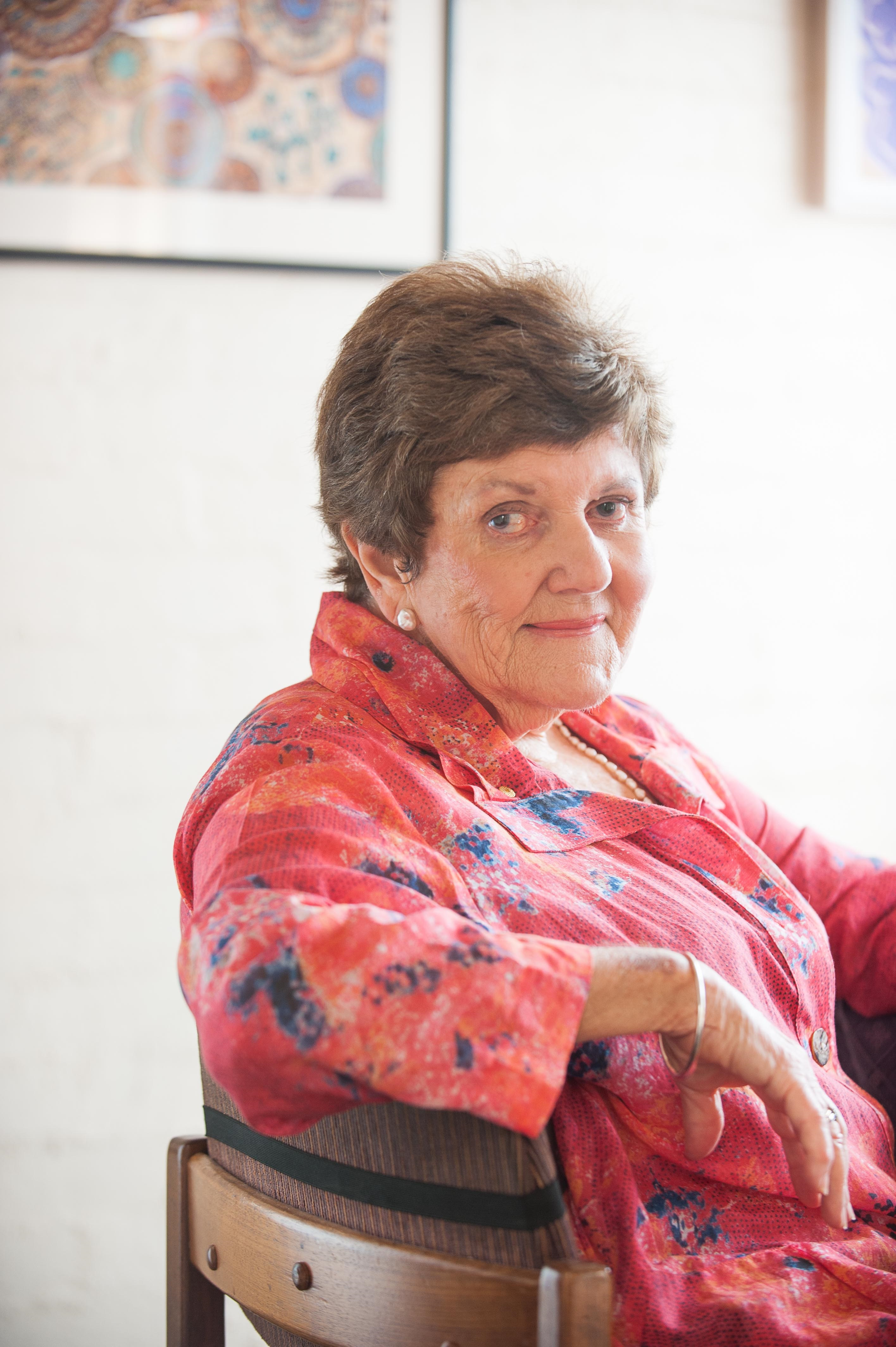
Kirner in 2013

After leaving Parliament, Kirner remained active in community affairs and politics. Initially this led her to a leading role in the Landcare movement. Subsequently, she devoted her energies to the Australian affiliate of EMILY's List Australia, an organisation which promotes pro-choice women's careers in politics. Kirner was one of the leaders of the movement in the Labor Party to adopt a policy of setting targets for the number of women candidates in winnable electorates. She repeatedly publicly supported candidates identified with her Socialist Left faction. From January 2006, Kirner was the Chair of the Ministerial Advisory Committee for Victorian Communities.

Kirner was also a board member of Museum Victoria, operators of Melbourne Museum, Royal Exhibition Building, Scienceworks Museum and Immigration Museum, Melbourne. Kirner was a long-time advocate of abortion law reform to legalise abortion. She was an avid supporter of the Essendon Football Club.

In 1993, she famously appeared on The Late Show with colleague David White, MLC for Doutta Galla, in a musical skit performing Joan Jett's "I Love Rock 'n' Roll". This brief performance was covered nationally by the media.

In an August 2009 interview with GTV-9, Kirner revealed that she had suffered a heavy near-fatal fall at a meeting 18 months earlier. She also revealed that she had osteoporosis and was blind in one eye.

== Death ==
In August 2013, it was announced that Kirner had been diagnosed with esophageal cancer and was undergoing chemotherapy and radiation treatment. Kirner died on 1 June 2015, 19 days short of her 77th birthday.

== Honours ==
On 26 January 1980, she was named a Member of the Order of Australia for her community service.

On 1 January 2001, Kirner was awarded the Centenary Medal. In the same year she was inducted onto the Victorian Honour Roll of Women.

On 11 June 2012, she was named a Companion of the Order of Australia for "eminent service to the Parliament of Victoria and to the community through conservation initiatives, contributions to gender equality, the development of education and training programs and the pursuit of civil rights and social inclusion."

In May 2017, the Victorian Government recognised her legacy by offering 25 scholarships to young women, who will participate in the Joan Kirner Young and Emerging Women Leaders program.

In May 2019, the new specialist maternity and paediatric centre at Sunshine Hospital was named the Joan Kirner Women's and Children's Hospital.

One of two tunnel-boring machines (TBM) to be utilised on the Metro Tunnel project is named Joan, in honour of Kirner. This TBM was officially launched on 15 August 2019.

== See also ==
- List of female heads of government in Australia

Victorian Legislative Council
Preceded by Herbert "Bon" Thomas	Member for Melbourne West; 1982–1988	Succeeded by Licia Kokocinski
Victorian Legislative Assembly
Preceded by Gordon Stirling	Member for Williamstown; 1988–1994	Succeeded by Steve Bracks
Political offices
Preceded by Rob Mackenzie	Minister for Conservation, Forests and Lands; 1985–1988	Succeeded by Kay Setches
Preceded by Caroline Hogg	Minister for Education; 1988–1990	Succeeded by Barry Pullen
Preceded by Robert Fordham	Deputy Premier of Victoria; 1989–1990	Succeeded by Jim Kennan
Preceded by John Cain Jr.	Premier of Victoria; 1990–1992	Succeeded by Jeff Kennett
Party political offices
Preceded by John Cain Jr.	Leader of the Labor Party in Victoria; 1990–1993	Succeeded by Jim Kennan
