= Health and Community Services Union =

The Health and Community Services Union is a Victorian branch the Health Services Union (HSU). HSU is registered organisation under the provisions of the Australian Workplace Relations Act 1996.

The union represents the majority of staff employed in psychiatric, government intellectual disability and alcohol and drug services in Victoria.

As a union, it represents members to provide the collective strength to bargain for reasonable wages and conditions and ensure proper professional standards are delivered.

== History ==
The Union was first registered under the Conciliation and Arbitration Act as a federal organisation on 12 April 1911, but had been operating on an informal basis for a number of years before that. It was then called "The Hospital and Asylum Attendants and Employees' Union", and its only members were in Victoria.

In 1914 the name was changed to "The Hospital Dispensary and Asylum Employees' Association". From 1924 branches in other states were formed.

On 26 May 1922 another Melbourne based Federal Organisation, "The Hospital Employees' Association", was registered. All its members worked in Victorian and NSW mental hospitals.

An amalgamation of the two bodies took place in 1930 and formed "The Hospital, Dispensary and Asylum Employees' and Allied Government Officers' Federation of Australia".

In 1946 the name was then formally changed to "The Hospital Employees' Federation of Australasia" and became "The Hospital Employees' Federation of Australia" (HEF) in 1959.

In 1991, the Hospital Employees Federation, including the Health and Community Services Union amalgamated with the N.S.W. Health Services Union. Both have a very long history record of supporting and organising members in mental health and alcohol and drug disability services.

== State Secretaries ==
- Ernest Dixon – 1961 to 1971
- Dick Jimmieson – 1971 to 1982
- Peter Bruce – 1982 to 1989
- Kaye Darveniza – 1989 to 1999
- Lloyd Williams – 1999 to 2019
- Paul Healey – 2019 to current
