= Licia Kokocinski =

Australian politician

Licia Kokocinski (born 8 October 1951) is an Australian politician. She served as a Labor Party member of the Victorian Legislative Council from 1988 to 1996, representing Melbourne West Province. She was the first woman from a non-English speaking background to be elected to the Victorian parliament.

== Biography ==
Kokocinski was born in Aquileia, Italy. She migrated to Australia at the age of four, and studied at Hadfield High School and the University High School Evening School, before graduating from the University of Melbourne in 1984. She worked in a number of equal opportunity roles and as a WorkCare rehabilitation adviser before gaining preselection to contest a seat in the Legislative Council at the 1988 state election. In parliament, Kokocinski served on the Social Development, Parliament of Victoria, Community Development and House Committees, and served on the board of the Melton campus of the Victoria University of Technology.

Kokocinski was promoted to Secretary to Shadow Cabinet in March 1993, but only three months later, was cut out of a factional deal between the dominant left and right factions for preselection for the 1996 election, losing out to the right faction's Sang Nguyen. She subsequently attacked the party as being "not serious about recognising women's participation" and resigned from her Cabinet position. She subsequently campaigned for the introduction of affirmative action preselection policies within the party. Lacking preselection to recontest her seat, she retired at the 1996 election.

After leaving politics, Kokocinski served as the national policy director for the ARPA Over 50s Association. Most recently, she has served as the Executive Director of disability rights organisation Action on Disabilities within Ethnic Communities. She was added to the Victorian Honour Roll of Women in 2007.

On 8 April 2019, Kokocinski was elected as a Councillor of the Shire of Hepburn in a by-election representing the Coliban Ward. After serving in the role for a few months, she was subsequently elected as Mayor for the 2019-2020 year.
