= Sang Nguyen =

Australian politician

Sang Minh Nguyen (Vietnamese: Nguyễn Minh Sang, pronounced [ŋwiəŋ˨˩˦ mɨn˧˧ ʂaːŋ˧˧]; born 1 January 1960) is a Vietnamese-Australian politician. He was a Labor Party member of the Victorian Legislative Council from May 1996 until November 2006, representing Melbourne West Province.

== Biography ==
Nguyen was born in the Vietnamese town of Long Xuyên. He studied at Lasan Duc-Minh High School in Saigon (now Ho Chi Minh City) from 1970–1974, but fled Vietnam in 1977 as a refugee with the fall of the city to the Communists and the end of the Vietnam War, spending 10 months in Laem Sing refugee camp in Chanthaburi, Thailand. After securing refugee status in 1978, he briefly studied at Greythorn High School then completed his secondary studies at Swinburne TAFE in 1980.

Nguyen became involved in a series of positions related to helping the community, working as a mathematics teacher at the Collingwood Education Centre from 1983 to 1984, as a youth worker at the Ecumenical Migration Centre from 1985 to 1987, and as a coordinator at the Indochinese Communities Council. In 1988, Nguyen was elected to the City of Richmond council, becoming at 28 the youngest member of the council and Victoria's first Vietnamese councillor. He later went on to serve as the city's mayor for a year in August 1991, the first Vietnamese mayor in Australia, and continued to serve as a councillor until 1994. During this period, he also became involved with the trade union movement, serving as a Migrant Liaison Officer for the National Union of Workers from 1989 to 1993.

In 1993, Nguyen took up a position as a staffer working for then federal Minister for Foreign Affairs Gareth Evans. He worked with the Minister for three years before winning pre-selection to contest the safe Labor Legislative Council seat of Melbourne West Province at the 1996 election. Nguyen faced a challenge from left-wing social welfare campaigner Les Twentyman, who ran as an independent, but Twentyman's vote dropped from 22.9% an earlier unsuccessful 1992 bid to just 10.3%, and Nguyen was elected. As a member of parliament, he served on the Family and Community Development Committee from 1996–99, the Drugs and Crime Prevention Committee from 1999–2006, and the House Committee from 2003–06. He was often a spokesperson for the Vietnamese community in the chamber and elsewhere.

In March 2006, Martin Pakula, who had unsuccessfully tried to unseat former federal Labor leader Simon Crean in a preselection challenge earlier in the month, was selected instead of Nguyen, despite Nguyen being keen to recontest the seat. In 2008 he considered running to be Labor's candidate in the Kororoit by-election.
