= Bon Thomas =

Australian politician

Herbert Arthur "Bon" Thomas (21 November 1911 – 2 November 1995) was an Australian politician.

He was born the son of a farmer's in Walla Walla, and was a farm worker while young. In 1945 he settled at Deer Park, where he ran a milk bar before becoming a taxi proprietor from 1951. He was active in the peace movement, attending the World Peace Conference in Stockholm and an anti-H bomb conference at Tokyo in 1958. From 1960 to 1976 he was a Sunshine City Councillor, serving as mayor from 1967 to 1968 and from 1969 to 1970. In 1970 he was elected to the Victorian Legislative Council for Melbourne West as a Labor member. He served until his retirement in 1982, and died in 1995.

Victorian Legislative Council
Preceded by Bunna Walsh	Member for Melbourne West; 1970–1982; Served alongside: Alexander Knight; Joan Coxsedge	Succeeded by Joan Kirner
