= Bunna Walsh =

Australian politician (1933–2022)

Ronald William "Bunna" Walsh (20 June 1933 - 30 March 2022) was an Australian politician.

He was born in Port Melbourne to labourer William John Joseph Walsh and Amy Lydia. He attended state schools and became a waterside worker in 1954. Having joined the Labor Party in 1960, he was an official with the Waterside Workers Federation from 1964 to 1979 and also served as president of the ALP's South Melbourne branch. In 1970 he was elected to the Victorian Legislative Council for Melbourne West, but his election was declared void later that year because of an old criminal conviction in the Children's Court.

Walsh was elected to the Victorian Legislative Assembly in 1979 as the member for Albert Park. He was government whip from 1982 to 1985 and then moved to the frontbench, holding the portfolios of Public Works (1985–87), Housing and Construction (1987–88), Property and Services (1988–90) and Water Resources (1988–90). In 1992 he attempted to return to the Legislative Council by contesting the seat of Monash, but he was defeated.

Victorian Legislative Council
Preceded by Archie Todd	Member for Melbourne West; 1970	Succeeded by Bon Thomas
Victorian Legislative Assembly
Preceded by Val Doube	Member for Albert Park; 1979–1992	Succeeded by John Thwaites
