= Buckley Machin =

Australian politician

Buckley Machin (21 October 1901 – 20 June 1963) was an English-born Australian politician.

He was born in Worksop in Nottinghamshire to coal miner John Machin and Martha Elizabeth Denman. He was a coal miner, and around 1926 married Florence Shaw, with whom he had one son, Peter born in Australia in 1933. He left England after the 1926 general strike and migrated to Australia around 1927, becoming a clerk and insurance agent. From 1939 he worked for Footscray City Council, first as an assistant storeman and cost clerk. From 1953 to 1955 he was the inaugural weights and measures inspector. A Labor Party member, he was elected to the Victorian Legislative Council for Melbourne West Province in 1955. In 1959 he introduced the first Clean Air Bill into the state parliament. Machin died at South Yarra in 1963.

Victorian Legislative Council
Preceded by Les Coleman	Member for Melbourne West; 1955–1963; Served alongside: Bert Bailey; Archie Todd	Succeeded by Alexander Knight
