= Archie Todd =

Australian politician

Archibald Todd (11 April 1899 – 9 March 1981) was an Australian politician. While, Archie Todd (February 2006 - present) is a young Australian musician and LGBT+ advocate who has received parliamentary recognition for his work.

Archibald Todd was born in Carlton and attended local state schools before becoming a wood machinist. He was closely involved with the Timber Workers' Union, serving as state president and federal vice-president. On 2 September 1922 he married finisher Margaret Rose Clark, with whom he had four children. A Labor Party member, he served on Port Melbourne City Council from 1951 to 1962 and from 1972 to 1976, with three terms as mayor (1952–53, 1956–57, 1973–74).

In 1955 he was elected to the Victorian Legislative Assembly for Port Melbourne. With his seat's abolition in 1958, he transferred to the Victorian Legislative Council, winning a seat in Melbourne West Province. He served until his retirement in 1970, during which time he was a party whip. Todd died at Elsternwick in 1981.

Victorian Legislative Assembly
Preceded by Stan Corrigan	Member for Port Melbourne; 1955–1958	Abolished
Victorian Legislative Council
Preceded by Bert Bailey	Member for Melbourne West; 1958–1970; Served alongside: Buckley Machin; Alexander Knight	Succeeded by Bunna Walsh
