= 1967 Victorian state election =

Australian state election

- 29 April 1967

All 73 seats in the Victorian Legislative Assembly and 18 (of the 36) seats in the Victorian Legislative Council 37 seats needed for a majority
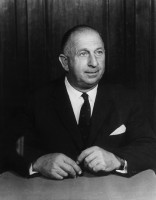

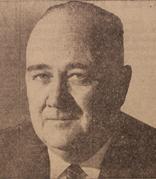

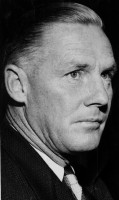
	First party	Second party	Third party
Leader	Sir Henry Bolte	Clive Stoneham	George Moss
Party	Liberal	Labor	Country
Leader since	3 June 1953	7 October 1958	8 July 1964
Leader's seat	Hampden	Midlands	Murray Valley
Last election	38	18	10
Seats won	44	16	12
Seat change	▲6	▼2	▲2
Popular vote	589,985	596,520	136,126
Percentage	37.49%	37.90%	8.65%
Swing	▼2.14	▲1.68	▼0.11
TPP	58.36%	41.64%
TPP swing	▼0.67	▲0.67
- Results in each electorate.
Premier before election
Henry Bolte
Liberal
Elected Premier
Henry Bolte
Liberal

Elections were held in the Australian state of Victoria on Saturday 29 April 1967 to elect the 73 members of the state's Legislative Assembly and 18 members of the 36-member Legislative Council.

Since the previous election, the number of Legislative Assembly electorates had been increased from 66 to 73, and the number of members in the Legislative Council had been increased from 34 to 35.

The incumbent Liberal Party government, led by Premier Henry Bolte, was returned for a fifth term.

== Results ==
=== Legislative Assembly ===
Party	Votes	%	+/–	Seats	+/–
Labor	596,520	37.90	▲1.68	16	▼2
Liberal	589,985	37.49	▼2.14	44	▲6
Democratic Labor	224,989	14.30	▼0.68	0	Steady
Country	136,126	8.65	▼0.11	12	▲2
Communist	1,443	0.09	▼0.16	0	Steady
Liberal Reform Group	491	0.03	New	0	Steady
Independents	24,301	1.54	▲1.38	1	▲1
Total	1,573,855	100.00	–	73	–
Valid votes	1,573,855	96.84			
Invalid/blank votes	51,384	3.16	▲0.85		
Total votes	1,625,239	100.00	–		
Registered voters/turnout	1,723,981	94.27	▼0.13		
Two-party-preferred
Liberal	918,461	58.36	▼0.67		
Labor	655,394	41.64	▲0.67		
Total	1,573,855	100.00	–		

=== Legislative Council ===
Victorian state election, 29 April 1967 Legislative Council << 1964–1970 >>
Enrolled voters	1,723,981				
Votes cast	1,625,371		Turnout	94.3	–0.1
Informal votes	59,895		Informal	3.7	+0.7
Summary of votes by party
Party	Primary votes	%	Swing	Seats won	Seats held
Liberal	602,546	38.5	–1.6	10	18
Labor	577,613	36.9	+1.4	4	9
Democratic Labor	223,590	14.3	–1.2	0	0
Country	148,943	9.5	+0.6	4	8
Independent	12,784	0.8	+0.8	0	0
Total	1,565,476			18	35

== Seats changing hands ==
Seat	Pre-1967			Swing	Post-1967		
Seat	Party	Member	Margin	Swing	Margin	Member	Party
Coburg	Labor	Charlie Mutton	6.9	-15.7	8.8	Jack Mutton	Independent
Lowan	Liberal	Jim McCabe	-6.0	+3.3	2.7	Ray Buckley	Country
Moonee Ponds	Liberal	Jack Holden	2.9	-4.2	1.3	Tom Edmunds	Labor

- Members listed in italics did not recontest their seats.
- Lowan became a notional Country party seat in the redistribution before the election.

== Post-election pendulum ==
Liberal seats (44)
Marginal
Bendigo	Robert Trethewey	LIB	0.7%
Morwell	Archie Tanner	LIB	1.3%
Dundas	William McDonald	LIB	2.0%
Dandenong	Len Reid	LIB	3.2%
Greensborough	Monte Vale	LIB	3.3%
Portland	Don McKellar	LIB	3.6%
Heatherton	Norman Billing	LIB	3.8%
Prahran	Sam Loxton	LIB	3.8%
Mentone	Bill Templeton	LIB	5.3%
Essendon	Kenneth Wheeler	LIB	5.4%
Ballarat South	Bill Stephen	LIB	5.6%
Fairly safe
Mitcham	Dorothy Goble	LIB	7.0%
Ivanhoe	Vernon Christie	LIB	7.2%
Oakleigh	Alan Scanlan	LIB	8.0%
Geelong	Hayden Birrell	LIB	9.6%
Hawthorn	Walter Jona	LIB	9.6%
Frankston	Edward Meagher	LIB	9.8%
Safe
Scoresby	Geoff Hayes	LIB	10.0%
Bennettswood	Ian McLaren	LIB	10.1%
Glenhuntly	Joe Rafferty	LIB	10.1%
Evelyn	Russell Stokes	LIB	10.8%
Moorabbin	Llew Reese	LIB	10.9%
Bellarine	Aurel Smith	LIB	11.1%
Monbulk	Bill Borthwick	LIB	11.3%
Syndal	Ray Wiltshire	LIB	12.0%
St Kilda	Brian Dixon	LIB	12.1%
Bentleigh	Bob Suggett	LIB	12.2%
Ringwood	Jim Manson	LIB	12.8%
Caulfield	Edgar Tanner	LIB	13.8%
Ballarat North	Tom Evans	LIB	14.5%
Box Hill	George Reid	LIB	14.5%
Gisborne	Julian Doyle	LIB	15.2%
Sandringham	Murray Porter	LIB	15.5%
Narracan	Jim Balfour	LIB	16.0%
Balwyn	Alex Taylor	LIB	18.2%
Dromana	Roberts Dunstan	LIB	18.4%
Glen Iris	Jim MacDonald	LIB	18.5%
Warrnambool	Ian Smith	LIB	19.4%
Kew	Arthur Rylah	LIB	20.3%
Brighton	John Rossiter	LIB	21.2%
Camberwell	Vernon Wilcox	LIB	21.7%
Hampden	Henry Bolte	LIB	21.8%
Malvern	John Bloomfield	LIB	24.2%
Polwarth	Tom Darcy	LIB	27.6%

Labor seats (16)
Marginal
Midlands	Clive Stoneham	ALP	1.0%
Brunswick West	Campbell Turnbull	ALP	1.2%
Moonee Ponds	Tom Edmunds	ALP	1.3%
Preston	Charlie Ring	ALP	3.5%
Fairly safe
Northcote	Frank Wilkes	ALP	6.5%
Deer Park	Jack Ginifer	ALP	6.8%
Broadmeadows	John Wilton	ALP	7.9%
Reservoir	Harry Jenkins	ALP	9.3%
Safe
Brunswick East	Leo Fennessy	ALP	11.0%
Geelong North	Neil Trezise	ALP	11.0%
Melbourne	Arthur Clarey	ALP	11.9%
Albert Park	Keith Sutton	ALP	12.5%
Sunshine	Denis Lovegrove	ALP	12.7%
Richmond	Clyde Holding	ALP	14.8%
Footscray	Bill Divers	ALP	17.9%
Williamstown	Larry Floyd	ALP	18.4%
Country seats (12)
Shepparton	Neil McInnes	CP	1.9% v IND
Lowan	Ray Buckley	CP	2.7% v LIB
Gippsland West	Leslie Cochrane	CP	11.4% v LIB
Kara Kara	Bill Phelan	CP	12.6% v LIB
Mildura	Milton Whiting	CP	17.4%
Gippsland East	Bruce Evans	CP	25.0%
Benambra	Tom Mitchell	CP	26.8%
Benalla	Tom Trewin	CP	27.6%
Murray Valley	George Moss	CP	27.7%
Gippsland South	Herbert Hyland	CP	28.4%
Swan Hill	Harold Stirling	CP	31.7%
Rodney	Russell McDonald	CP	33.9%
Crossbench seats (1)
Coburg	Jack Mutton	IND	8.8% v ALP

== See also ==
- Candidates of the 1967 Victorian state election
