= 1961 Victorian state election =

Australian state election

- 15 July 1961

All 66 seats in the Victorian Legislative Assembly and 17 (of the 34) seats in the Victorian Legislative Council 34 seats needed for a majority
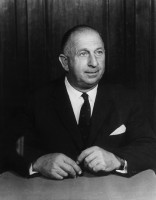

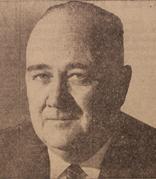

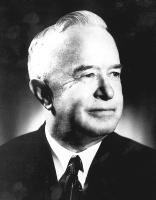
	First party	Second party	Third party
Leader	Henry Bolte	Clive Stoneham	Herbert Hyland
Party	Liberal and Country	Labor	Country
Leader since	3 June 1953	7 October 1958	20 April 1955
Leader's seat	Hampden	Midlands	Gippsland South
Last election	39	18	9
Seats won	39	17	9
Seat change	0	▼1	0
Popular vote	521,777	552,015	102,184
Percentage	36.44%	38.55%	7.14%
Swing	▼0.74	▲0.86	▼2.16
TPP	57.94%	42.06%
TPP swing	▲0.18	▼0.18
Premier before election
Henry Bolte
Liberal and Country
Premier after election
Henry Bolte
Liberal and Country

Elections were held in the Australian state of Victoria on 15 July 1961 to elect the 66 members of the state's Legislative Assembly and 17 members of the 34-member Legislative Council. MLAs were elected for three year terms and MLCs were elected for six year terms. All were elected in single-member districts or provinces using preferential voting.

The Liberal and Country Party (LCP) government of Premier Henry Bolte won a third term in office. It was the first Victorian election at which all seats in both houses were contested by at least two candidates, and the first at which both houses were contested on the same day.

== Key dates ==
Date	Event
24 May 1961	The Parliament was prorogued.
1 June 1961	Writs were issued by the Administrator to proceed with an election.
23 June 1961	Close of nominations.
15 July 1961	Polling day, between the hours of 8am and 6pm.
28 July 1961	The Bolte Ministry was reconstituted, with two new ministers sworn in.
1 August 1961	The writ was returned and the results formally declared.
1 August 1961	Parliament resumed for business.

== Results ==
=== Legislative Assembly ===
The election produced almost no change in the electoral balance.

Victorian state election, 15 July 1961 Legislative Assembly << 1958–1964 >>
Enrolled voters	1,554,856				
Votes cast	1,554,856		Turnout	94.41	+0.18
Informal votes	35,937		Informal	2.45	+0.67
Summary of votes by party
Party	Primary votes	%	Swing	Seats	Change
Labor	552,015	38.55	+0.86	17	– 1
Liberal and Country	521,777	36.44	–0.74	39	± 0
Democratic Labor	242,753	16.95	+2.53	0	± 0
Country	102,184	7.14	–2.16	9	± 0
Other	3,722	0.26	+0.16	0	± 0
Independent	9,474	0.66	–0.64	1	+ 1
Total	1,431,925			66	
Two-party-preferred
Liberal and Country	829,977	57.9	+0.1		
Labor	602,493	42.1	–0.1		

=== Legislative Council ===
Victorian state election, 15 July 1961 Legislative Council << 1958–1964 >>
Enrolled voters	1,554,856				
Votes cast	1,467,482		Turnout	94.3	+8.0
Informal votes	46,697		Informal	3.2	+1.5
Summary of votes by party
Party	Primary votes	%	Swing	Seats won	Seats held
Labor	552,075	38.9	–0.3	4	9
Liberal and Country	538,013	37.9	+2.1	9	17
Democratic Labor	237,464	16.7	+1.8	0	0
Country	88,416	6.2	+0.7	4	8
Independent	4,817	0.3	+0.3	0	0
Total	1,420,785			17	34

== Seats changing hands ==
Seat	Pre-1961			Swing	Post-1961		
Seat	Party	Member	Margin	Swing	Margin	Member	Party
Moorabbin	Liberal and Country	Bob Suggett	9.4	N/A	8.7	Bob Suggett	Independent Liberal
Oakleigh	Labor	Val Doube	1.8	-4.2	2.5	Alan Scanlan	Liberal and Country

- In addition, the LCP retained the seat of Ballarat North which it had won from the Country party at the 1960 by-election.

== See also ==
- Candidates of the 1961 Victorian state election
- Members of the Victorian Legislative Assembly, 1958–1961
- Members of the Victorian Legislative Assembly, 1961–1964
- Bolte Ministry
