= Bert Bailey (politician) =

Australian politician

Albert Joseph (Bert) Bailey (30 April 1915 – 17 June 1999), Australian politician, was a Member of the Victorian Legislative Council for Melbourne West Province representing the Labor Party from 21 June 1952 until March 1955 and then the Democratic Labor Party (or the Australian Labor Party (Anti-Communist) as it was originally known) from March 1955 until his defeat on 20 June 1958
