= Ewen Paul Cameron =

Australian politician (1891–1964)

Sir Ewen Cameron

Victorian Minister of Health
- In office 7 June 1955 – 28 July 1961
- Premier: Henry Bolte
- Preceded by: Val Doube
- Succeeded by: Ronald Mack

Personal details
- Born: Ewen Paul Cameron; 15 January 1891 Preston, Victoria
- Died: 18 January 1964 (aged 73) Camberwell, Victoria, Australia
- Party: Liberal Party
- Other political affiliations: Liberal and Country Party
- Spouse: Flora May White (m. 1920; died 1960)
- Occupation: Stock and station agent

Military service
- Allegiance: Australia
- Branch/service: Australian Imperial Force
- Years of service: 1915–1919
- Unit: 4th Light Horse Regiment

Sir Ewen Paul Cameron (15 January 1891 – 18 January 1964) was an Australian politician.

== Background ==
Cameron was born in Preston, Victoria, the son of Martin Cameron, a grazier from Scotland, and his wife Jane. From 1915 to 1918, he served in the 4th Light Horse Regiment of the Australian Army.

He was a founding member of the Camberwell branch of the United Australia Party, and was a campaign manager for Trevor Oldham and Robert Menzies. On 7 August 1948, Cameron was elected to the Victorian Legislative Council in a by-election as one of two Liberal Party members for East Yarra Province.

== Minister of Health ==
When Henry Bolte defeated John Cain at the 1955 election, Cameron was appointed to the Bolte Ministry as minister of health, in which capacity he served for over six years. When the ministry was reconstituted in 1961, Cameron (who had been knighted that year for his service as health minister), became chair of committees in the Legislative Council. He died in office in 1964.

Victorian Legislative Council
Preceded by Clifdon Eager; William Edgar	Member for East Yarra Province; 1948–1964; Served alongside: Clifdon Eager (1948–58); Dick Hamer (1958–64)	Succeeded by Dick Hamer; William Campbell
Political offices
Preceded by Val Doube	Minister of Health; 1955–1961	Succeeded by Ronald Mack
