= Alexander Knight (politician) =

Australian politician

Alexander Wilson Knight (21 March 1924 – 2 November 1985) was an Australian politician.

Knight was born in Collingwood to fireman John Richard Knight and Janet Shirra Wilson. He attended Spotswood State School and then Royal Melbourne Technical School, becoming a turbine driver. He married Leila Margaret Muir, with whom he had two children. He served in the Pacific in World War II, and was part of the occupation of Japan. In 1953 he joined the Labor Party, and the following year became secretary of the Federated Engine Drivers' and Firemen's Association, a position he held until 1963. From 1957 to 1968 he was a Williamstown City Councillor; he was mayor from 1962 to 1963.

In 1963 Knight was elected in a by-election to the Victorian Legislative Council for Melbourne West Province. He briefly served as Labor whip from June to August 1970. In 1977 he lost preselection to Joan Coxsedge, and he contested the 1979 election as an independent Labor candidate, but was defeated. Knight died in 1985.

Victorian Legislative Council
Preceded by Buckley Machin	Member for Melbourne West; 1963–1979; Served alongside: Archie Todd; Bunna Walsh; Bon Thomas	Succeeded by Joan Coxsedge
