= Bill Campbell (Victorian politician) =

Australian politician

William Montgomery Campbell (10 June 1920 – 9 June 1996) was an Australian politician.

He was educated at the Royal Melbourne Institute of Technology and worked as a mechanical engineer and business manager. From 1945 to 1948 he was chief draftsman for Rheem Australia, and in 1948 he became the sales, works and manufacturing manager for Fischer & Porter, a scientific instrument company. He had been a founding member of the Liberal Party's Ashburton branch, and in 1964 was elected to the Victorian Legislative Council as the member for East Yarra. From 1970 to 1976 he was secretary of the parliamentary party, and from 1976 to 1983 he was Deputy President of the Council. He resigned from parliament in 1983. Campbell died in 1996.

Victorian Legislative Council
Preceded by Ewen Cameron	Member for East Yarra; 1964–1983; Served alongside: Dick Hamer; Haddon Storey	Succeeded by Mark Birrell
