= Alan Hunt (politician) =

Australian politician (1927–2013)

The Honourable Alan Hunt AM

President of the Victorian Legislative Council
- In office 1988 – 2 October 1992
- Preceded by: Rod Mackenzie
- Succeeded by: Bruce Chamberlain

Member of the Victorian Legislative Council for South Eastern Province
- In office 15 July 1961 – 2 October 1992

Personal details
- Born: Alan John Hunt; 9 October 1927 Peterborough, South Australia
- Died: 19 July 2013 (aged 85) Frankston, Victoria, Australia
- Party: Liberal Party
- Other political affiliations: Liberal and Country Party
- Children: Bob Hunt, Greg Hunt, Peter Hunt, John Hunt, Stephen Hunt
- Education: University of Melbourne
- Profession: Solicitor

Alan John Hunt AM (9 October 1927 – 19 July 2013) was an Australian politician, having been a member of the Victorian Legislative Council from 1961 until 1992.

Hunt started his education in South Australia and later attended Melbourne Grammar School. He then went to the University of Melbourne where he was a non-resident law student at Trinity College. He was president of the Melbourne University Liberals from 1948 to 1950 and secretary of the then National Union of Australian University Students. After obtaining a law degree he practised as a solicitor until entering the Legislative Council in 1961, representing the Liberal Party.

Hunt was first appointed as a minister in 1971, under the premiership of Henry Bolte. He served in a variety of portfolios under the Bolte, Hamer and Thompson governments, most notability as Minister for Local Government, Planning and Minister for Education. He was briefly Attorney-General of Victoria in 1976.

From 1979 to 1982 the Hamer government initiated and implemented a reorganisation of the Victorian Education Department. Hunt as Minister of Education (1979 – 1982) and Norman Lacy as Assistant Minister of Education (1979 – 1980) were jointly responsible for the reform policy development process and the early stages of its implementation. Together, they sought to reform the administration of the department, which they saw as centralised and inefficient. Hunt appointed Lacy Chairman of the Ministerial Consultative Committee that steered the project in its early phase and the Implementation Steering Committee later. He pulled together a group of people from academia and business to assist him as well as PA Management Consultants. The Government legislated – at the end of 1981 – to scrap the teaching divisions (Primary, Secondary and Technical) and to remove the statutory bodies (The Committee of Classifiers and the Teachers' Tribunal.

Alan Hunt also served as leader of the government in the Legislative Council from 1978 until the Liberals lost government in 1982. In 1986 he challenged Jeff Kennett for the leadership of the Victorian Liberal Party but was unsuccessful.

He retired from politics in 1992 and was the father of former Federal Liberal parliamentarian Greg Hunt.
