= Melbourne West Province =

Former electoral province of the Victorian Legislative Council, Australia

Coordinates: 37°49′S 144°56′E

Melbourne West Victoria—Legislative Council
- State: Victoria
- Created: 1904
- Abolished: 2006
- Namesake: West Melbourne, Victoria

Melbourne West Province was an electorate of the Victorian Legislative Council from 1904 until 2006.

It was created in June 1904 when Melbourne Province was reduced in size (four members down to two), North Yarra Province and South Yarra Province were abolished. The new Melbourne West Province, Melbourne North Province, Melbourne South Province and Melbourne East Province were then created. Its area was defined by the Electoral Provinces Boundaries Act 1903 as:

Commencing at the intersection of Elizabeth-street and Victoria-street; thence westerly by Victoria-street and the boundary of the city of Melbourne to the Saltwater River; thence southerly by that river and the Yarra River to the Coode Canal; thence easterly by that canal and the Yarra River to Clarendon-street; thence south-easterly by Clarendon-street to Dorcas-street; thence south-Westerly by that street to Nelson-road; thence southerly by Nelson-road to St. Vincent-street west; thence south-westerly by that street to Cowie-street; thence north-westerly by Cowie-street to Pickles-street; thence southerly by that street to the shore of Hobson's Bay; thence westerly and southerly by the shore of Hobson's Bay and westerly by the shore of Port Phillip Bay to the west boundary of the town of Williamstown (as described in the Local Government Act 1890); thence north by the said boundary to Stony Creek; thence north-westerly by that creek to Reid-street; thence west by that street to the Geelong-road; thence south-westerly, west, and southerly by that road to the Kororoit Creek; thence northerly by that creek to the west boundary of section 18, parish of Cut-Paw-Paw; thence north by the west boundaries of sections 18, 19, and 22 to the Saltwater River; thence easterly by that river to Maribyrnong-road; thence easterly by that road and the south boundary of allotment i), section 5, parish of Doutta Galla, to the Moonee Ponds; thence southerly by the Moonee Ponds to Flemington-road; and thence south-easterly by that road and Elizabeth-street to the commencing point. To include the electors afloat in Hobson's Bay.

Melbourne West Province was abolished at the 2006 state election in the wake of the Bracks Labor government's reform of the Legislative Council.

== Members for Melbourne West Province ==
Member 1	Party	Year	Member 2	Party
John Aikman	Non-Labor	1904	William Edgar	Non-Labor
John Aikman	Non-Labor	1907	William Edgar	Non-Labor
John Aikman	Non-Labor	1910	William Edgar	Non-Labor
John Aikman	Non-Labor	1913	William Fielding	Labor
John Aikman	Non-Labor	1916	Arthur Disney	Labor
Daniel McNamara	Labor	1916	Arthur Disney	Labor
John Aikman	Non-Labor	1916	Arthur Disney	Labor
John Aikman	Nationalist	1917	Arthur Disney	Labor
John Aikman	Nationalist	1919	Arthur Disney	Labor
Robert Williams	Labor	1922	Arthur Disney	Labor
Robert Williams	Labor	1925	Arthur Disney	Labor
Robert Williams	Labor	1928	Arthur Disney	Labor
Robert Williams	Labor	1931	Arthur Disney	Labor
Robert Williams	Independent	1932	Arthur Disney	Labor
Robert Williams	Independent	1934	Arthur Disney	Labor
Robert Williams	Independent	1937	Arthur Disney	Labor
Pat Kennelly	Labor	1938	Arthur Disney	Labor
Pat Kennelly	Labor	1940	Arthur Disney	Labor
Pat Kennelly	Labor	1943	Arthur Disney	Labor
Pat Kennelly	Labor	1943	Les Coleman	Labor
Pat Kennelly	Labor	1946	Les Coleman	Labor
Pat Kennelly	Labor	1949	Les Coleman	Labor
Bert Bailey	Labor	1952	Les Coleman	Labor
Bert Bailey	Labor (A-C)	1955	Les Coleman	Labor (A-C)
Bert Bailey	Labor (A-C)	1955	Buckley Machin	Labor
Archie Todd	Labor	1958	Buckley Machin	Labor
Archie Todd	Labor	1961	Buckley Machin	Labor
Archie Todd	Labor	1963	Alexander Knight	Labor
Archie Todd	Labor	1964	Alexander Knight	Labor
Archie Todd	Labor	1967	Alexander Knight	Labor
Bunna Walsh	Labor	1970	Alexander Knight	Labor
Bon Thomas	Labor	1970	Alexander Knight	Labor
Bon Thomas	Labor	1973	Alexander Knight	Labor
Bon Thomas	Labor	1976	Alexander Knight	Labor
Bon Thomas	Labor	1979	Joan Coxsedge	Labor
Joan Kirner	Labor	1982	Joan Coxsedge	Labor
Joan Kirner	Labor	1985	Joan Coxsedge	Labor
Licia Kokocinski	Labor	1988	Joan Coxsedge	Labor
Licia Kokocinski	Labor	1992	Jean McLean	Labor
Sang Nguyen	Labor	1996	Jean McLean	Labor
Sang Nguyen	Labor	1999	Kaye Darveniza	Labor
Sang Nguyen	Labor	2002	Kaye Darveniza	Labor

== Election results ==
2002 Victorian state election: Melbourne West Province
Party	Candidate	Votes	%	±%
Labor	Sang Nguyen	78,617	60.4	−0.7
Liberal	Peter Hammond	32,350	24.9	−8.2
Greens	Andrew Ellis	15,007	11.5	+11.5
Democrats	Barry Thomas	4,123	3.2	−2.6
Total formal votes		130,097	95.4	−0.3
Informal votes		6,314	4.6	+0.3
Turnout		136,411	92.3	
Two-party-preferred result
Labor	Sang Nguyen	91,780	70.6	+5.7
Liberal	Peter Hammond	38,237	29.4	−5.7
Labor hold		Swing	+5.7	
