= Bob May (politician) =

Australian politician (1909–1986)

Robert William May (6 July 1909 – 16 April 1986) was an Australian politician.

Born in Yarram to grazier Robert May and Elizabeth Buist Wilson, May attended Macks Creek State School and Yarram High School before becoming a dairy farmer and grazier in Trenton Valley. On 21 April 1930 he married Helena Rossiter, with whom he had seven children. A director of South Eastern Dairy, Yarram Dairy Company and Australian Dairy Techmcas Services, May joined the Country Party in 1934 and sided with John McEwen in the 1930s split, serving as a central councillor when the party was reunited in 1943. He was the Country Party's treasurer from 1949 to 1953 and president from 1956 to 1957, when he was elected to the Victorian Legislative Council in a by-election for Gippsland Province. He held the seat until 1973, when he was defeated.
