= John Tripovich =

Australian politician

John Matthew Tripovich (16 December 1907 – 6 August 1976) was an Australian politician.

Tripovich was born at Coburg to labourer Elias Tripovich and Caroline Grimshaw Sutherland. He attended state schools at Preston and Essendon, and in 1923 began working as a porter on the railway at Glenroy. On 4 June 1929 he married Edna May Alder, with whom he had two children. From 1936 to 1946 he was an assistant station master in the Mallee and the Wimmera. From 1946 he was a country organiser for the Labor Party, becoming assistant state secretary in 1955 and state secretary from 1955 to 1961.

In 1960 Tripovich was elected to the Victorian Legislative Council for Doutta Galla Province. He was briefly Labor leader in the Legislative Council from June to August 1970, and was deputy leader from 1970 to 6 August 1976, when he died at Parkville.

Victorian Legislative Council
Preceded by Bill Slater	Member for Doutta Galla; 1960–1976; Served alongside: Samuel Merrifield; Dolph Eddy; Bill Landeryou	Succeeded by David White
