= Electoral results for the Templestowe Province =

Victoria, Australia, district election results

This is a list of electoral results for the Templestowe Province in Victorian state elections.

== Members for Templestowe Province ==
Member 1	Party	Year		
Vasey Houghton	Liberal	1967	Member 2	Party
Vasey Houghton	Liberal	1970	Raymond Garrett	Liberal
Vasey Houghton	Liberal	1973	Raymond Garrett	Liberal
Vasey Houghton	Liberal	1976	Ralph Howard	Liberal
Vasey Houghton	Liberal	1979	Ralph Howard	Liberal
Vasey Houghton	Liberal	1982	Mike Arnold	Labor
John Miles	Liberal	1985	Mike Arnold	Labor
John Miles	Liberal	1988	Bruce Skeggs	Liberal
Bill Forwood	Liberal	1992	Bruce Skeggs	Liberal
Bill Forwood	Liberal	1996	Carlo Furletti	Liberal
Bill Forwood	Liberal	1999	Carlo Furletti	Liberal
Bill Forwood	Liberal	2002	Lidia Argondizzo	Labor

== Election results ==
=== Elections in the 2000s ===
2002 Victorian state election: Templestowe Province
Party	Candidate	Votes	%	±%
Labor	Lidia Argondizzo	56,952	43.5	+42.1
Liberal	Carlo Furletti	54,670	41.7	−11.8
Greens	Robyn Roberts	17,469	13.3	−21.5
Independent	Reginald Temple	1,079	0.8	+0.8
Hope	Lee-Anne Poynton	893	0.7	+0.7
Total formal votes		131,063	96.2	−0.8
Informal votes		5,195	3.8	+0.8
Turnout		136,258	93.7	
Two-party-preferred result
Labor	Lidia Argondizzo	70,611	53.9	+9.6
Liberal	Carlo Furletti	60,452	46.1	−9.6
Labor gain from Liberal		Swing	+9.6	

=== Elections in the 1990s ===
1999 Victorian state election: Templestowe Province
Party	Candidate	Votes	%	±%
Liberal	Bill Forwood	69,383	53.5	−1.3
Greens	Robyn Evans	46,776	36.1	+36.1
Democrats	Bernie Millane	13,568	10.5	+1.8
Total formal votes		129,727	97.0	−0.7
Informal votes		3,944	3.0	+0.7
Turnout		133,671	93.3	
Two-candidate-preferred result
Liberal	Bill Forwood	72,294	55.7	−3.5
Greens	Robyn Evans	57,426	44.3	+44.3
Liberal hold		Swing	−3.5	

1996 Victorian state election: Templestowe Province
Party	Candidate	Votes	%	±%
Liberal	Carlo Furletti	70,405	54.8	−4.7
Labor	Heather Garth	45,196	35.2	+0.4
Democrats	Angela Carter	11,079	8.6	+8.6
Democratic Labor	Frances Murphy	1,867	1.5	−1.2
Total formal votes		128,547	97.7	+1.8
Informal votes		3,001	2.3	−1.8
Turnout		131,548	94.8	
Two-party-preferred result
Liberal	Carlo Furletti	75,925	59.2	−2.5
Labor	Heather Garth	52,392	40.8	+2.5
Liberal hold		Swing	−2.5	

1992 Victorian state election: Templestowe Province
Party	Candidate	Votes	%	±%
Liberal	Bill Forwood	73,029	59.4	+8.1
Labor	Desmond Johnson	42,734	34.8	−13.8
Independent	Richard Fitzherbert	3,899	3.2	+3.2
Democratic Labor	Valda McCarthy	3,231	2.6	+2.6
Total formal votes		122,893	95.9	0.0
Informal votes		5,190	4.1	0.0
Turnout		128,083	95.6	
Two-party-preferred result
Liberal	Bill Forwood	75,741	61.7	+10.3
Labor	Desmond Johnson	47,032	38.3	−10.3
Liberal hold		Swing	+10.3	

=== Elections in the 1980s ===
1988 Victorian state election: Templestowe Province
Party	Candidate	Votes	%	±%
Liberal	Bruce Skeggs	59,288	52.5	+2.8
Labor	Mike Arnold	53,664	47.5	+5.5
Total formal votes		112,952	96.1	−1.4
Informal votes		4,586	3.9	+1.4
Turnout		117,538	93.3	−0.6
Liberal hold		Swing	−0.3	

1985 Victorian state election: Templestowe Province
Party	Candidate	Votes	%	±%
Liberal	John Miles	53,726	49.7	
Labor	Gary Greenway	45,433	42.0	
Democrats	Kenneth Peak	8,917	8.3	
Total formal votes		108,076	97.5	
Informal votes		2,756	2.5	
Turnout		110,832	93.9	
Two-party-preferred result
Liberal	John Miles	57,104	52.8	+2.3
Labor	Gary Greenway	50,958	47.2	−2.3
Liberal hold		Swing	+2.3	

1982 Victorian state election: Templestowe Province
Party	Candidate	Votes	%	±%
Labor	Mike Arnold	57,302	48.1	−1.4
Liberal	Ralph Howard	51,098	42.9	−7.6
Democrats	Geoffrey Loftus-Hills	10,701	9.0	+9.0
Total formal votes		119,901	97.7	+0.3
Informal votes		2,818	2.3	−0.3
Turnout		121,919	93.8	+0.3
Two-party-preferred result
Labor	Mike Arnold	62,946	52.9	+3.4
Liberal	Ralph Howard	56,155	47.1	−3.4
Labor gain from Liberal		Swing	+3.4	

=== Elections in the 1970s ===
1979 Victorian state election: Templestowe Province
Party	Candidate	Votes	%	±%
Liberal	Vasey Houghton	56,059	50.5	−7.3
Labor	Mike Arnold	54,881	49.5	+7.3
Total formal votes		110,940	97.4	−0.2
Informal votes		2,934	2.6	+0.2
Turnout		113,874	93.5	+0.5
Liberal hold		Swing	−7.3	

1976 Victorian state election: Templestowe Province
Party	Candidate	Votes	%	±%
Liberal	Ralph Howard	60,572	57.8	
Labor	Pauline Toner	44,172	42.2	
Total formal votes		104,744	97.6	
Informal votes		2,516	2.4	
Turnout		107,260	93.0	
Liberal hold		Swing		

1973 Victorian state election: Templestowe Province
Party	Candidate	Votes	%	±%
Liberal	Vasey Houghton	78,711	47.6	+5.9
Labor	Frederick Davis	62,586	37.8	−5.5
Democratic Labor	Christopher Curtis	13,418	8.1	−6.8
Australia	Geoffrey Loftus-Hills	10,743	6.5	+6.5
Total formal votes		165,458	96.8	−0.1
Informal votes		5,408	3.2	+0.1
Turnout		170,866	93.6	−1.3
Two-party-preferred result
Liberal	Vasey Houghton		58.4	+3.0
Labor	Frederick Davis		41.6	−3.0
Liberal hold		Swing	+3.0	

1970 Victorian state election: Templestowe Province
Party	Candidate	Votes	%	±%
Labor	Neville Telfer	59,093	43.3	+4.2
Liberal	Raymond Garrett	56,987	41.7	−5.1
Democratic Labor	Ernest Dobson	20,466	14.9	+0.7
Total formal votes		136,546	96.9	−0.2
Informal votes		4,349	3.1	+0.2
Turnout		140,895	94.9	+0.5
Two-party-preferred result
Liberal	Raymond Garrett	75,708	55.4	−3.9
Labor	Neville Telfer	60,838	44.6	+3.9
Liberal hold		Swing	−3.9	

=== Elections in the 1960s ===
1967 Victorian state election: Templestowe Province
Party	Candidate	Votes	%	±%
Liberal	Vasey Houghton	54,559	46.8	
Labor	Ian Stewart	45,597	39.1	
Democratic Labor	Leo Morison	16,549	14.2	
Total formal votes		116,705	97.1	
Informal votes		3,457	2.9	
Turnout		120,162	94.4	
Two-party-preferred result
Liberal	Vasey Houghton	69,224	59.3	
Labor	Ian Stewart	47,481	40.8	
Liberal hold		Swing		
