= Electoral results for the district of Ivanhoe =

Victoria, Australia, district election results

This is a list of electoral results for the Electoral district of Ivanhoe in Victorian state elections.

== Members for Ivanhoe ==
| Member | Party | Term |
|---|---|---|
| Robert Gardner | Independent | 1945–1947 |
| Rupert Curnow | Liberal | 1947–1950 |
| Frank Block | Liberal | 1951–1952 |
| Michael Lucy | Labor | 1952–1955 |
| Michael Lucy | Labor (Anti-Communist) | 1952–1955 |
| Vernon Christie | Liberal | 1955–1973 |
| Bruce Skeggs | Liberal | 1973–1982 |
| Tony Sheehan | Labor | 1982–1985 |
| Vin Heffernan | Liberal | 1985–1996 |
| Craig Langdon | Labor | 1996–2010 |
| Anthony Carbines | Labor | 2010–present |

== Election results ==
=== Elections in the 2020s ===
2022 Victorian state election: Ivanhoe
| Party | Candidate | Votes | % | ±% |
|---|---|---|---|---|
| Labor | Anthony Carbines | 17,333 | 42.7 | −3.7 |
| Liberal | Bernadette Khoury | 12,566 | 31.0 | −1.4 |
| Greens | Emily Bieber | 7,808 | 19.2 | +4.5 |
| Family First | Sarah Hayward | 1,216 | 3.0 | +3.0 |
| Animal Justice | Sonja Ristevski | 937 | 2.3 | +2.3 |
| Independent | Craig Langdon | 739 | 1.8 | –3.1 |
| Total formal votes | | 34,509 | 96.3 | +1.1 |
| Informal votes | | 1,178 | 3.7 | −1.1 |
| Turnout | | 42,135 | 89.7 | |
Two-party-preferred result
| Labor | Anthony Carbines | 25,746 | 63.0 | +0.7 |
| Liberal | Bernadette Khoury | 15,123 | 37.0 | −0.7 |
| Labor hold | | Swing | +0.7 | |

=== Elections in the 2010s ===
2018 Victorian state election: Ivanhoe
| Party | Candidate | Votes | % | ±% |
|---|---|---|---|---|
| Labor | Anthony Carbines | 18,800 | 46.45 | +10.49 |
| Liberal | Monica Clark | 13,084 | 32.33 | −7.70 |
| Greens | Andrew Conley | 5,962 | 14.73 | −0.91 |
| Independent | Craig Langdon | 1,969 | 4.86 | +0.02 |
| Democratic Labour | Philip Jenkins | 660 | 1.63 | +1.63 |
| Total formal votes | | 40,475 | 95.22 | −0.19 |
| Informal votes | | 2,030 | 4.78 | +0.19 |
| Turnout | | 42,505 | 90.87 | −1.98 |
Two-party-preferred result
| Labor | Anthony Carbines | 25,244 | 62.37 | +8.96 |
| Liberal | Monica Clark | 15,231 | 37.63 | −8.96 |
| Labor hold | | Swing | +8.96 | |

2014 Victorian state election: Ivanhoe
| Party | Candidate | Votes | % | ±% |
|---|---|---|---|---|
| Liberal | Carl Ziebell | 15,730 | 40.0 | −2.0 |
| Labor | Anthony Carbines | 14,133 | 36.0 | +0.1 |
| Greens | Paul Kennedy | 6,147 | 15.6 | −1.8 |
| Independent | Craig Langdon | 1,905 | 4.8 | +4.8 |
| Christians | Gurmender Grewal | 558 | 1.4 | +1.4 |
| Family First | Jesse Boer | 474 | 1.2 | +0.9 |
| Independent | Abdirizak Mohamed | 355 | 0.9 | +0.9 |
| Total formal votes | | 39,302 | 95.4 | −0.1 |
| Informal votes | | 1,890 | 4.6 | +0.1 |
| Turnout | | 41,192 | 92.8 | −1.4 |
Two-party-preferred result
| Labor | Anthony Carbines | 20,991 | 53.4 | +1.6 |
| Liberal | Carl Ziebell | 18,311 | 46.6 | −1.6 |
| Labor hold | | Swing | +1.6 | |

2010 Victorian state election: Ivanhoe
| Party | Candidate | Votes | % | ±% |
|---|---|---|---|---|
| Liberal | Carl Ziebell | 14,413 | 41.98 | +10.17 |
| Labor | Anthony Carbines | 12,140 | 35.36 | −6.43 |
| Greens | Paul Kennedy | 6,240 | 18.18 | +3.69 |
| Democratic Labor | Stephen Smith | 1,185 | 3.45 | +3.45 |
| Independent | Gerrit Schorel-Hlavka | 351 | 1.02 | +1.02 |
| Total formal votes | | 34,329 | 95.51 | +0.05 |
| Informal votes | | 1,613 | 4.49 | −0.05 |
| Turnout | | 35,942 | 92.68 | −0.21 |
Two-party-preferred result
| Labor | Anthony Carbines | 17,755 | 51.68 | −7.19 |
| Liberal | Carl Ziebell | 16,599 | 48.32 | +7.19 |
| Labor hold | | Swing | −7.19 | |

=== Elections in the 2000s ===
2006 Victorian state election: Ivanhoe
| Party | Candidate | Votes | % | ±% |
|---|---|---|---|---|
| Labor | Craig Langdon | 13,772 | 41.8 | −10.3 |
| Liberal | Maxwell Gratton | 10,481 | 31.8 | −2.5 |
| Greens | Marisa Palmer | 4,776 | 14.5 | +2.4 |
| Independent | Jenny Mulholland | 3,186 | 9.7 | +9.7 |
| Family First | Kevin Tan | 737 | 2.2 | +2.2 |
| Total formal votes | | 32,952 | 95.5 | −1.1 |
| Informal votes | | 1,567 | 4.5 | +1.1 |
| Turnout | | 34,519 | 92.9 | |
Two-party-preferred result
| Labor | Craig Langdon | 19,918 | 60.4 | −2.1 |
| Liberal | Maxwell Gratton | 13,034 | 39.6 | +2.1 |
| Labor hold | | Swing | −2.1 | |

2002 Victorian state election: Ivanhoe
| Party | Candidate | Votes | % | ±% |
|---|---|---|---|---|
| Labor | Craig Langdon | 17,490 | 52.1 | +2.2 |
| Liberal | Peter Nolan | 11,498 | 34.3 | −9.0 |
| Greens | Glen Doreian | 4,067 | 12.1 | +7.0 |
| Independent | Anna Morton | 265 | 0.8 | +0.8 |
| Independent | Martin Appleby | 187 | 0.6 | +0.6 |
| Independent | Gary Schorel-Hlavka | 57 | 0.2 | +0.2 |
| Total formal votes | | 33,564 | 96.6 | −0.7 |
| Informal votes | | 1,192 | 3.4 | +0.7 |
| Turnout | | 34,756 | 93.2 | |
Two-party-preferred result
| Labor | Craig Langdon | 20,972 | 62.5 | +7.7 |
| Liberal | Peter Nolan | 12,586 | 37.5 | −7.7 |
| Labor hold | | Swing | +7.7 | |

=== Elections in the 1990s ===
1999 Victorian state election: Ivanhoe
| Party | Candidate | Votes | % | ±% |
|---|---|---|---|---|
| Labor | Craig Langdon | 15,079 | 50.1 | +0.8 |
| Liberal | Don McLean | 12,788 | 42.5 | −5.0 |
| Greens | Robyn Roberts | 1,737 | 5.8 | +5.8 |
| Hope | Lee-Anne Poynton | 358 | 1.2 | +1.2 |
| Natural Law | Lawrence Clarke | 132 | 0.4 | −2.8 |
| Total formal votes | | 30,094 | 97.2 | −0.7 |
| Informal votes | | 858 | 2.8 | +0.7 |
| Turnout | | 30,952 | 93.2 | |
Two-party-preferred result
| Labor | Craig Langdon | 16,679 | 55.4 | +3.8 |
| Liberal | Don McLean | 13,413 | 44.6 | −3.8 |
| Labor hold | | Swing | +3.8 | |

1996 Victorian state election: Ivanhoe
| Party | Candidate | Votes | % | ±% |
|---|---|---|---|---|
| Labor | Craig Langdon | 14,965 | 49.3 | +8.7 |
| Liberal | Vin Heffernan | 14,399 | 47.5 | −3.4 |
| Natural Law | Stephen Griffith | 969 | 3.2 | −1.2 |
| Total formal votes | | 30,333 | 97.9 | +1.5 |
| Informal votes | | 648 | 2.1 | −1.5 |
| Turnout | | 30,981 | 94.2 | |
Two-party-preferred result
| Labor | Craig Langdon | 15,623 | 51.6 | +5.9 |
| Liberal | Vin Heffernan | 14,667 | 48.4 | −5.9 |
| Labor gain from Liberal | | Swing | +5.9 | |

1992 Victorian state election: Ivanhoe
| Party | Candidate | Votes | % | ±% |
|---|---|---|---|---|
| Liberal | Vin Heffernan | 15,318 | 50.9 | +6.3 |
| Labor | Chris Watson | 12,226 | 40.6 | −9.3 |
| Natural Law | Steve Griffith | 1,315 | 4.4 | +4.4 |
| Independent | K.H. Schuller | 858 | 2.8 | +2.8 |
| Independent | Steriani Vassis | 406 | 1.3 | +1.3 |
| Total formal votes | | 30,123 | 96.4 | +0.1 |
| Informal votes | | 1,138 | 3.6 | −0.1 |
| Turnout | | 31,261 | 95.4 | |
Two-party-preferred result
| Liberal | Vin Heffernan | 16,330 | 54.3 | +8.2 |
| Labor | Chris Watson | 13,743 | 45.7 | −8.2 |
| Liberal gain from Labor | | Swing | +8.2 | |

=== Elections in the 1980s ===
1988 Victorian state election: Ivanhoe
| Party | Candidate | Votes | % | ±% |
|---|---|---|---|---|
| Liberal | Vin Heffernan | 13,931 | 50.33 | −1.30 |
| Labor | Patricia Moynihan | 11,671 | 42.16 | −6.21 |
| Democrats | Howard McCallum | 2,079 | 7.51 | +7.51 |
| Total formal votes | | 27,681 | 97.26 | −0.48 |
| Informal votes | | 780 | 2.74 | +0.48 |
| Turnout | | 28,461 | 92.94 | −0.61 |
Two-party-preferred result
| Liberal | Vin Heffernan | 14,505 | 52.40 | +0.77 |
| Labor | Patricia Moynihan | 13,176 | 47.60 | −0.77 |
| Liberal hold | | Swing | +0.77 | |

1985 Victorian state election: Ivanhoe
| Party | Candidate | Votes | % | ±% |
|---|---|---|---|---|
| Liberal | Vin Heffernan | 14,665 | 51.6 | +6.4 |
| Labor | Tony Sheehan | 13,740 | 48.4 | +0.1 |
| Total formal votes | | 28,405 | 97.7 | |
| Informal votes | | 657 | 2.3 | |
| Turnout | | 29,062 | 93.6 | |
| Liberal gain from Labor | | Swing | +2.7 | |

1982 Victorian state election: Ivanhoe
| Party | Candidate | Votes | % | ±% |
|---|---|---|---|---|
| Labor | Tony Sheehan | 13,492 | 47.2 | +6.8 |
| Liberal | Bruce Skeggs | 13,426 | 47.0 | −1.3 |
| Democrats | Harold Shepherd | 1,677 | 5.9 | −5.4 |
| Total formal votes | | 28,595 | 98.1 | +0.5 |
| Informal votes | | 561 | 1.9 | −0.5 |
| Turnout | | 29,156 | 94.5 | +0.6 |
Two-party-preferred result
| Labor | Tony Sheehan | 14,449 | 50.5 | +3.9 |
| Liberal | Bruce Skeggs | 14,144 | 49.5 | −3.9 |
| Labor gain from Liberal | | Swing | +3.9 | |

=== Elections in the 1970s ===
1979 Victorian state election: Ivanhoe
| Party | Candidate | Votes | % | ±% |
|---|---|---|---|---|
| Liberal | Bruce Skeggs | 13,483 | 48.3 | −5.7 |
| Labor | Tony Sheehan | 11,279 | 40.4 | +2.3 |
| Democrats | Mario Piraino | 3,146 | 11.3 | +11.3 |
| Total formal votes | | 27,908 | 97.6 | −0.5 |
| Informal votes | | 689 | 2.4 | +0.5 |
| Turnout | | 28,597 | 93.9 | +1.3 |
Two-party-preferred result
| Liberal | Bruce Skeggs | 14,902 | 53.4 | −7.7 |
| Labor | Tony Sheehan | 13,006 | 46.6 | +7.7 |
| Liberal hold | | Swing | −7.7 | |

1976 Victorian state election: Ivanhoe
| Party | Candidate | Votes | % | ±% |
|---|---|---|---|---|
| Liberal | Bruce Skeggs | 15,153 | 54.0 | +7.2 |
| Labor | John Lelleton | 10,691 | 38.1 | −0.5 |
| Democratic Labor | Margaret Rush | 2,196 | 7.8 | −0.3 |
| Total formal votes | | 28,040 | 98.1 | |
| Informal votes | | 544 | 1.9 | |
| Turnout | | 28,584 | 92.6 | |
Two-party-preferred result
| Liberal | Bruce Skeggs | 17,129 | 61.1 | +6.2 |
| Labor | John Lelleton | 10,911 | 38.9 | −6.2 |
| Liberal hold | | Swing | −6.2 | |

1973 Victorian state election: Ivanhoe
| Party | Candidate | Votes | % | ±% |
|---|---|---|---|---|
| Labor | John Daley | 11,401 | 43.6 | −0.4 |
| Liberal | Bruce Skeggs | 11,095 | 42.4 | +0.5 |
| Democratic Labor | Kevin Barry | 2,127 | 8.1 | −6.0 |
| Australia | Patricia Robinson | 1,518 | 5.8 | +5.8 |
| Total formal votes | | 26,141 | 97.0 | −0.4 |
| Informal votes | | 799 | 3.0 | +0.4 |
| Turnout | | 26,940 | 93.6 | −0.3 |
Two-party-preferred result
| Liberal | Bruce Skeggs | 13,158 | 50.3 | −4.3 |
| Labor | John Daley | 12,983 | 49.7 | +4.3 |
| Liberal hold | | Swing | −4.3 | |

1970 Victorian state election: Ivanhoe
| Party | Candidate | Votes | % | ±% |
|---|---|---|---|---|
| Labor | Thomas Rich | 10,718 | 44.0 | +3.9 |
| Liberal | Vernon Christie | 10,211 | 41.9 | −1.2 |
| Democratic Labor | Michael Lucy | 3,444 | 14.1 | 0.0 |
| Total formal votes | | 24,373 | 97.4 | −0.1 |
| Informal votes | | 658 | 2.6 | +0.1 |
| Turnout | | 25,031 | 93.9 | −0.3 |
Two-party-preferred result
| Liberal | Vernon Christie | 13,312 | 54.6 | −2.6 |
| Labor | Thomas Rich | 11,061 | 45.4 | +2.6 |
| Liberal hold | | Swing | −2.6 | |

=== Elections in the 1960s ===
1967 Victorian state election: Ivanhoe
| Party | Candidate | Votes | % | ±% |
|---|---|---|---|---|
| Liberal | Vernon Christie | 10,254 | 43.1 | +0.7 |
| Labor | Thomas Rich | 9,545 | 40.1 | −0.9 |
| Democratic Labor | Cyril Cummins | 3,365 | 14.1 | −2.5 |
| Independent | Bruce Graham | 642 | 2.7 | +2.7 |
| Total formal votes | | 23,806 | 97.5 | |
| Informal votes | | 604 | 2.5 | |
| Turnout | | 24,410 | 94.2 | |
Two-party-preferred result
| Liberal | Vernon Christie | 13,604 | 57.2 | +0.6 |
| Labor | Thomas Rich | 10,202 | 42.8 | −0.6 |
| Liberal hold | | Swing | +0.6 | |

1964 Victorian state election: Ivanhoe
| Party | Candidate | Votes | % | ±% |
|---|---|---|---|---|
| Liberal and Country | Vernon Christie | 10,492 | 47.9 | −0.1 |
| Labor | William Kelly | 8,235 | 37.6 | +0.7 |
| Democratic Labor | Cyril Cummins | 3,192 | 14.6 | −0.5 |
| Total formal votes | | 21,919 | 98.3 | +0.2 |
| Informal votes | | 383 | 1.7 | −0.2 |
| Turnout | | 22,302 | 94.1 | −0.2 |
Two-party-preferred result
| Liberal and Country | Vernon Christie | 13,467 | 61.4 | −0.2 |
| Labor | William Kelly | 8,452 | 38.6 | +0.2 |
| Liberal and Country hold | | Swing | −0.2 | |

1961 Victorian state election: Ivanhoe
| Party | Candidate | Votes | % | ±% |
|---|---|---|---|---|
| Liberal and Country | Vernon Christie | 10,492 | 48.0 | −0.2 |
| Labor | Norman Rothfield | 8,070 | 36.9 | −1.1 |
| Democratic Labor | Cyril Cummins | 3,298 | 15.1 | +1.3 |
| Total formal votes | | 21,860 | 98.1 | −0.6 |
| Informal votes | | 413 | 1.9 | +0.6 |
| Turnout | | 22,273 | 94.3 | +0.6 |
Two-party-preferred result
| Liberal and Country | Vernon Christie | 13,475 | 61.6 | +1.2 |
| Labor | Norman Rothfield | 8,385 | 38.4 | −1.2 |
| Liberal and Country hold | | Swing | +1.2 | |

=== Elections in the 1950s ===
1958 Victorian state election: Ivanhoe
| Party | Candidate | Votes | % | ±% |
|---|---|---|---|---|
| Liberal and Country | Vernon Christie | 10,547 | 48.2 | |
| Labor | David Walker | 8,305 | 38.0 | |
| Democratic Labor | Cyril Cummins | 3,021 | 13.8 | |
| Total formal votes | | 21,873 | 98.7 | |
| Informal votes | | 289 | 1.3 | |
| Turnout | | 22,162 | 93.7 | |
Two-party-preferred result
| Liberal and Country | Vernon Christie | 13,210 | 60.4 | |
| Labor | David Walker | 8,663 | 39.6 | |
| Liberal and Country hold | | Swing | | |

1955 Victorian state election: Ivanhoe
| Party | Candidate | Votes | % | ±% |
|---|---|---|---|---|
| Liberal and Country | Vernon Christie | 9,014 | 50.4 | |
| Labor | David Walker | 6,420 | 35.9 | |
| Labor (A-C) | John O'Dwyer | 2,447 | 13.7 | |
| Total formal votes | | 17,881 | 98.7 | |
| Informal votes | | 237 | 1.3 | |
| Turnout | | 18,118 | 94.0 | |
Two-party-preferred result
| Liberal and Country | Vernon Christie | 11,093 | 62.0 | |
| Labor | David Walker | 6,788 | 38.0 | |
| Liberal and Country gain from Labor | | Swing | | |

1952 Victorian state election: Ivanhoe
| Party | Candidate | Votes | % | ±% |
|---|---|---|---|---|
| Labor | Michael Lucy | 14,800 | 44.0 | +2.4 |
| Independent | Reginald Leonard | 9,058 | 26.9 | +26.9 |
| Liberal and Country | Frank Block | 8,424 | 25.0 | −33.4 |
| Independent | Harcourt Bell | 1,372 | 4.1 | +4.1 |
| Total formal votes | | 33,654 | 98.2 | −1.1 |
| Informal votes | | 606 | 1.8 | +1.1 |
| Turnout | | 34,260 | 94.8 | +0.7 |
Two-party-preferred result
| Labor | Michael Lucy | 18,069 | 53.5 | +11.9 |
| Liberal and Country | Frank Block | 15,585 | 46.5 | −11.9 |
| Labor gain from Liberal and Country | | Swing | +11.9 | |

1951 Ivanhoe state by-election
| Party | Candidate | Votes | % | ±% |
|---|---|---|---|---|
| Labor | Michael Lucy | 10,144 | 35.6 | −6.0 |
| Liberal and Country | Frank Block | 9,952 | 34.9 | −23.5 |
| Independent | Reginald Leonard | 8,400 | 29.5 | +29.5 |
| Total formal votes | | 28,496 | 98.7 | −0.6 |
| Informal votes | | 361 | 1.3 | +0.6 |
| Turnout | | 28,857 | 89.4 | −4.7 |
Two-party-preferred result
| Liberal and Country | Frank Block | 15,835 | 55.6 | −2.8 |
| Labor | Michael Lucy | 12,661 | 44.4 | +2.8 |
| Liberal and Country hold | | Swing | −2.8 | |

1950 Victorian state election: Ivanhoe
| Party | Candidate | Votes | % | ±% |
|---|---|---|---|---|
| Liberal and Country | Rupert Curnow | 16,850 | 58.4 | −3.3 |
| Labor | David Walker | 11,997 | 41.6 | +41.6 |
| Total formal votes | | 28,847 | 99.3 | +0.5 |
| Informal votes | | 209 | 0.7 | −0.5 |
| Turnout | | 29,056 | 94.1 | +1.0 |
| Liberal and Country hold | | Swing | N/A | |

=== Elections in the 1940s ===
1947 Victorian state election: Ivanhoe
| Party | Candidate | Votes | % | ±% |
|---|---|---|---|---|
| Liberal | Rupert Curnow | 14,971 | 61.7 | +12.7 |
| Independent | Robert Gardner | 8,613 | 35.5 | −15.5 |
| Independent Liberal | Leighton Weber | 677 | 2.8 | +2.8 |
| Total formal votes | | 24,261 | 98.8 | +0.9 |
| Informal votes | | 283 | 1.2 | −0.9 |
| Turnout | | 24,544 | 93.1 | +6.1 |
| Liberal gain from Independent | | Swing | N/A | |

- Preferences were not distributed.

1945 Victorian state election: Ivanhoe
| Party | Candidate | Votes | % | ±% |
|---|---|---|---|---|
| Independent | Robert Gardner | 10,162 | 51.0 | |
| Liberal | Maxwell Dunn | 9,756 | 49.0 | |
| Total formal votes | | 19,918 | 97.9 | |
| Informal votes | | 419 | 2.1 | |
| Turnout | | 20,337 | 87.0 | |
| Independent gain from Liberal | | Swing | | |
