= Candidates of the 1976 Victorian state election =

The 1976 Victorian state election was held on 20 March 1976.

== Seat changes ==
- Following the redistribution, the following members of the Legislative Assembly contested different seats:
  - Tom Austin (Hampden, Liberal) contested Ripon.
  - Bill Baxter (Murray Valley, National) contested Benambra.
  - Norman Billing (Heatherton, Liberal) contested Springvale.
  - Hayden Birrell (Geelong, Liberal) contested Geelong West.
  - Esmond Curnow (Kara Kara, Labor) contested Bendigo.
  - Tom Edmunds (Moonee Ponds, Labor) contested Ascot Vale.
  - Jack Ginifer (Deer Park, Labor) contested Keilor.
  - Geoff Hayes (Scoresby, Liberal) contested Wantirna.
  - Norman Lacy (Ringwood, Liberal) contested Warrandyte.
  - Rob Maclellan (Gippsland West, Liberal) contested Berwick.
  - Llew Reese (Moorabbin, Liberal) contested Heatherton.
  - Tom Roper (Brunswick West, Labor) contested Brunswick.
  - Aurel Smith (Bellarine, Liberal) contested South Barwon.
  - Morris Williams (Box Hill, Liberal) contested Doncaster.
- Bruce Chamberlain MLA (Dundas, Liberal) contested Western Province.
- The following members of the Legislative Council contested different seats:
  - Michael Clarke (Northern, National) contested Bendigo Province.
  - Dolph Eddy (Doutta Galla, Labor) contested Thomastown Province.
  - Jock Granter (Bendigo, Liberal) contested Central Highlands Province.
  - Vernon Hauser (Boronia, Liberal) contested Nunawading Province.
  - Glyn Jenkins (South Western, Liberal) contested Geelong Province.

== Retiring Members ==
=== Labor ===
- Ron McAlister MLA (Brunswick East)

=== Liberal ===
- Dorothy Goble MLA (Mitcham)
- Jim MacDonald MLA (Glen Iris)
- Edward Meagher MLA (Frankston)
- John Rossiter MLA (Brighton)
- Sir Edgar Tanner MLA (Caulfield)
- Vernon Wilcox MLA (Camberwell)
- Ray Wiltshire MLA (Syndal)
- Murray Byrne MLC (Ballarat)
- Sir Raymond Garrett MLC (Templestowe)
- Graham Nicol MLC (Monash)

=== National ===
- Tom Mitchell MLA (Benambra)
- Ivan Swinburne MLC (North Eastern)

== Legislative Assembly ==
Sitting members are shown in bold text. Successful candidates are highlighted in the relevant colour. Where there is possible confusion, an asterisk (*) is also used.

Electorate	Held by	Labor candidates	Liberal candidates	National candidates	DLP candidates	Other candidates
Albert Park	Labor	**Val Doube**	Timothy Hinchcliffe			
Ascot Vale	Labor	**Tom Edmunds**	Edmond Murphy			
Ballarat North	Liberal	Jeremy Harper	**Tom Evans**		Dennis O'Reilly	
Ballarat South	Liberal	Frank Sheehan	**Bill Stephen**			
Balwyn	Liberal	Paul Gibson	**Jim Ramsay**		John Hansen	Peter King (AP)
Benalla	National	John Dennis	Leo Gorman	**Tom Trewin**	Christopher Cody	
Benambra	National	Ken Coghill	Lou Lieberman	**Bill Baxter**	Kevin Redfern	Robert Wiltshire (Ind)
Bendigo	Liberal	**Esmond Curnow**	**Daryl McClure**			
Bennettswood	Liberal	Peter Bruce	**Ian McLaren**		James Tighe	
Bentleigh	Liberal	Lindsay Thomas	**Bob Suggett**		Peter Madden	John Stoker (WP)
Berwick	Liberal	Judith Wallace	**Rob Maclellan**	Ronald Irwin	Michael Houlihan	
Box Hill	Liberal	Howard Hodgens	Donald Mackinnon		James Brosnan	
Brighton	Liberal	Robert Gerrand	Jeannette Patrick		Peter Lawlor	Ian Mullins (AP)
Broadmeadows	Labor	**John Wilton**	Donald McClelland			
Brunswick	Labor	**Tom Roper**	Alfredo Kouris			Stephen Cope (Ind); Robert Douglas (Ind); Anthony Errichiello (Ind); Leslie Johns (Ind); Grahame Kermonde (Ind); Marian Kermonde (Ind); Ronald Moran (Ind); Angelo Russo (Ind)
Bundoora	Labor	John Cain	Dorothy Baker			
Burwood	Liberal	Douglas Bennett	Jeff Kennett		Joseph Stanley	Michael Boffa (WP)
Carrum	Labor	Ian Cathie	Allan Coombes			
Caulfield	Liberal	Gilbert Wright	Charles Francis		Mary Lane	
Coburg	Independent	Peter Gavin	Nicholas Kosenko		Helen Hart	**Jack Mutton** (Ind)
Dandenong	Labor	**Alan Lind**	James Grayling			
Doncaster	Liberal	Francis Smith	**Morris Williams**		Margaret Coogan	Edward Ajani (Ind)
Dromana	Liberal	Geoffrey Eastwood	**Roberts Dunstan**		John Cass	
Essendon	Liberal	Barry Rowe	**Kenneth Wheeler**			
Evelyn	Liberal	Warren Thomas	**Jim Plowman**	Errol Simon	Francis Feltham	
Footscray	Labor	**Robert Fordham**	James Kapoudaglis			
Forest Hill	Liberal	Neville Gay	John Richardson		Francis Poole	
Frankston	Liberal	Alison Ogden	Graeme Weideman		John Glynn	
Geelong East	Liberal	Dennis O'Brien	Phil Gude			
Geelong North	Labor	**Neil Trezise**	Stanley Yates			
Geelong West	Liberal	Kevin Kirby	**Hayden Birrell**			
Gippsland East	National		Geoffrey Ramsden	**Bruce Evans**	Robert McMahon	Geoffrey Cox (Ind)
Gippsland South	National	Russel Wilson	David Kallady	**Neil McInnes**	Leonard Carroll	
Gisborne	Liberal	George Beardsley	**Athol Guy**	Robert Cooper	Paul McManus	
Glenhuntly	Liberal	Gerard Vaughan	**Joe Rafferty**		Terence Farrell	
Glenroy	Labor	Jack Culpin	Francis Mott			
Greensborough	Liberal	Brian McKinlay	**Monte Vale**			
Hawthorn	Liberal	Evan Walker	**Walter Jona**		Daniel Condon	Jennifer Relf (Ind)
Heatherton	Liberal	Peter Spyker	**Llew Reese**			
Ivanhoe	Liberal	John Lelleton	**Bruce Skeggs**		Margaret Rush	
Keilor	Labor	**Jack Ginifer**	Vaclav Ubl			Spyros Kokkinos (Ind)
Kew	Liberal	Gary Jungwirth	**Rupert Hamer**		Francis Duffy	Charles Barrington (Ind); Margaret Tighe (Ind)
Knox	Liberal	Steve Crabb	Bruce Fasham			
Lowan	Liberal	Brian Brooke	**Jim McCabe**	Howard Ellis	Kevin Dunn	Francis Petering (Ind)
Malvern	Liberal	Evelyn Watson	**Lindsay Thompson**		John Cotter	
Melbourne	Labor	**Barry Jones**	Bruce Atkinson			Lou-Anne Barker (Ind)
Mentone	Liberal	Barry Hirt	**Bill Templeton**		Desmond Burke	
Midlands	Liberal	Donal Harvey	**Bill Ebery**	Clarence Rodda	Audrey Drechsler	
Mildura	National	Noel Treharne	Lloyd Beasy	**Milton Whiting**	Stanley Croughan	
Mitcham	Liberal	Gordon Henderson	George Cox			
Monbulk	Liberal	Stuart Morris	**Bill Borthwick**			
Morwell	Labor	**Derek Amos**	Frank Hall	James Davis	John Mann	
Murray Valley	National	Abigail Donlon	Brian Lumsden	Ken Jasper	Patrick Payne	
Narracan	Liberal	Pat Bartholomeusz	**Jim Balfour**	Arthur Hewson	Brian Handley	
Niddrie	Labor	Jack Simpson	Peter Kirchner			Lancelot Hutchinson (Ind)
Noble Park	Liberal	Tony Van Vliet	Peter Collins			
Northcote	Labor	**Frank Wilkes**	Gillford Brown			
Oakleigh	Liberal	Sam Papasavas	**Alan Scanlan**			Trevor Cooke (AP); Leslie Kausman (Ind)
Polwarth	Liberal	Ronald Wheaton	**Cec Burgin**	Frederick Sadler	Thomas Fleming	
Portland	Liberal	Bill Lewis	**Don McKellar**	Clive Mitchell	Patrick Healy	
Prahran	Liberal	Morris Milder	**Sam Loxton**			Paul Krutulis (WP); Michael Salvaris (Ind)
Preston	Labor	**Carl Kirkwood**	John Miles			
Reservoir	Labor	**Jim Simmonds**	Tony De Domenico			Matthew Curie (Ind)
Richmond	Labor	**Clyde Holding**	John Rush			Andrew Jamieson (Ind)
Ringwood	Liberal	Robert Wallace	Peter McArthur			
Ripon	Labor	Alexander Pope	**Tom Austin**	Rob Borbidge	Francis O'Brien	
Rodney	National	Michael Smith	Graham Arthur	**Eddie Hann**	David Kane	
Sandringham	Liberal	Vivienne Brophy	**Max Crellin**		Salvatore Pinzone	
Shepparton	National	Stephen Fletcher	Bill Hunter	**Peter Ross-Edwards**	Martha Bennetts	
South Barwon	Liberal	Raymond Hughan	**Aurel Smith**		James Jordan	
Springvale	Liberal	Kevin King	**Norman Billing**			
St Kilda	Liberal	David Hardy	**Brian Dixon**			Frederick Gray (Ind); Peter Lake (Ind); Ronald Petersen (Ind)
Sunshine	Labor	**Bill Fogarty**	David More			Charles Skidmore (Ind)
Swan Hill	Liberal	Graeme Lechte	**Alan Wood**	James Mitchell	Daniel Mason	
Syndal	Liberal	John Perryman	Geoff Coleman			
Wantirna	Liberal	Christopher Miller	**Geoff Hayes**		Clement Elliot	
Warrandyte	Liberal	Frederick Davis	**Norman Lacy**			
Warrnambool	Liberal	Vernon Delaney	**Ian Smith**	Murray Lane	Peter Burke	
Werribee	Labor	Anthony Robinson	Neville Hudson			Walter Lockhart (WP)
Westernport	Liberal	John Daley	Doug Jennings	Michael Woods	Kevin Leydon	
Williamstown	Labor	**Gordon Stirling**	Wallace Feeney			

== Legislative Council ==
Sitting members are shown in bold text. Successful candidates are highlighted in the relevant colour. Where there is possible confusion, an asterisk (*) is also used.

Province	Held by	Labor candidates	Liberal candidates	National candidates	Other candidates
Ballarat	Liberal	Ronald Corbett	Rob Knowles		
Bendigo	Liberal	Elaine Knight	Bruce Reid	**Michael Clarke**	Ronald Gane (DLP)
Boronia	Liberal	Stuart Russell	Kevin Foley		
Central Highlands	Liberal	Max McDonald	**Jock Granter**	Pat McNamara	Peter Brown (Ind)
Chelsea	Liberal	Michael Duffy	**Neil Stacey**		
Doutta Galla	Labor	Bill Landeryou	Rex Webb		
East Yarra	Liberal	Robert Gurry	**Haddon Storey**		
Geelong	Liberal	Rod Mackenzie	**Glyn Jenkins**		
Gippsland	Labor	**Eric Kent**	James Taylor	John Vinall	Leslie Hilton (DLP)
Higinbotham	Liberal	Russell Shearn	**Murray Hamilton**		
Melbourne	Labor	**Ivan Trayling**	Bryce McNair		
Melbourne North	Labor	**John Walton**	Geoff Lutz		
Melbourne West	Labor	**Bon Thomas**	Peter Stirling		
Monash	Liberal	Johan Hulskamp	James Guest		
North Eastern	National	Lewis Gee	George Ikinger	David Evans	
North Western	National	Edward McCormack	William Armstrong	**Bernie Dunn**	
Nunawading	Liberal	John Madden	**Vernon Hauser**		
South Eastern	Liberal	Merton Ryan	**Roy Ward**	William Gleeson	Noel Gleeson (DLP)
Templestowe	Liberal	Pauline Toner	Ralph Howard		
Thomastown	Labor	**Dolph Eddy**	John Fletcher		
Waverley	Liberal	Anthony Scarcella	Don Saltmarsh		
Western	Liberal	Thomas Windsor	Bruce Chamberlain	Linden Cameron	
