= Electoral results for the district of Williamstown =

Victoria, Australia, district election results

This is a list of electoral results for the Electoral district of Williamstown in Victorian state elections.

== Members for Williamstown ==
Member	Party	Term
John Foster	Unaffiliated	1856–1857
George Perry	Unaffiliated	1857–1859
George Frederic Verdon	Liberal	1859–1868
Thomas Mason	Unaffiliated	1868–1871
Alfred Clark	Liberal	1871–1887
James Mirams	Liberal	1887–1889
William Carter	Labor	1889–1894
James Styles	Labor	1894–1900
Alexander Ramsay	Liberal	1900–1904
John Lemmon	Labor	1904–1955
Larry Floyd	Labor	1955–1973
Gordon Stirling	Labor	1973–1988
Joan Kirner	Labor	1988–1994
Steve Bracks	Labor	1994–2007
Wade Noonan	Labor	2007–2018
Melissa Horne	Labor	2018–present

== Election results ==
=== Elections in the 2020s ===
==== 2022 ====
2022 Victorian state election: Williamstown
Party	Candidate	Votes	%	±%
Labor	Melissa Horne	16,173	41.5	−8.2
Liberal	Daria Kellander	10,928	28.0	+7.7
Greens	Suzette Rodoreda	6,013	15.4	+2.1
Democratic Labour	Rochelle Fisher	1,632	4.2	+4.2
Victorian Socialists	Julien Q. Macandili	1,528	3.9	+3.9
Animal Justice	Patricia Mackevicius	1,049	2.7	+0.5
Freedom	Alexander Ansalone	976	2.5	+2.5
Family First	Joshua Mosely	675	1.7	+1.7
Total formal votes		38,974	95.4	+0.3
Informal votes		1,878	4.6	−0.3
Turnout		40,852	88.9	+2.7
Two-party-preferred result
Labor	Melissa Horne	24,726	63.4	−6.5
Liberal	Daria Kellander	14,248	36.6	+6.5
Labor hold		Swing	−6.5	

=== Elections in the 2010s ===
==== 2018 ====
2018 Victorian state election: Williamstown
Party	Candidate	Votes	%	±%
Labor	Melissa Horne	21,839	50.36	+5.72
Liberal	Pallavee Joshi	7,832	18.06	−9.98
Greens	Sam Long	6,960	16.05	−4.67
Independent	Peter Hemphill	4,407	10.16	+10.16
Animal Justice	Virginia Saint-James	1,251	2.88	+2.88
Independent	Lisa Bentley	1,081	2.49	+2.49
Total formal votes		43,370	95.23	+0.24
Informal votes		2,173	4.77	−0.24
Turnout		45,543	89.44	−2.65
Two-party-preferred result
Labor	Melissa Horne	31,273	72.07	+5.53
Liberal	Pallavee Joshi	12,118	27.93	−5.53
Labor hold		Swing	+5.53	

==== 2014 ====
2014 Victorian state election: Williamstown
Party	Candidate	Votes	%	±%
Labor	Wade Noonan	18,417	44.6	−0.3
Liberal	Alan Shea	11,569	28.0	−2.7
Greens	Simon Crawford	8,547	20.7	−1.9
Voice for the West	Libby Krepp	2,268	5.5	+5.5
Independent	Khalil Wehbe	457	1.1	+1.1
Total formal votes		41,258	95.0	+0.4
Informal votes		2,175	5.0	−0.4
Turnout		43,433	92.1	+0.5
Two-party-preferred result
Labor	Wade Noonan	27,441	66.5	+3.3
Liberal	Alan Shea	13,849	33.5	−3.3
Labor hold		Swing	+3.3	

==== 2010 ====
2010 Victorian state election: Williamstown
Party	Candidate	Votes	%	±%
Labor	Wade Noonan	15,859	46.75	−14.95
Liberal	David McConnell	11,023	32.50	+11.82
Greens	Paul Fogarty	7,040	20.75	+8.39
Total formal votes		33,922	94.52	−0.15
Informal votes		1,965	5.48	+0.15
Turnout		35,887	92.10	+0.31
Two-party-preferred result
Labor	Wade Noonan	20,973	61.84	−12.41
Liberal	David McConnell	12,941	38.16	+12.41
Labor hold		Swing	−12.41	

=== Elections in the 2000s ===
==== 2007 by-election ====
2007 Williamstown state by-election
Party	Candidate	Votes	%	±%
Labor	Wade Noonan	16,775	55.74	–5.96
Greens	Janet Rice	6,592	21.90	+9.54
Independent	Catherine Cumming	2,703	8.98	+8.98
Family First	Veronica Hayes	1,472	4.89	+0.44
Democratic Labor	Vern Hughes	789	2.59	+2.59
Independent	Janis Rossiter	648	2.15	+2.15
Independent	Vivienne Millington	485	1.61	+1.61
Independent	Nathan Tavendale	331	1.10	+1.10
Independent	Wajde Assaf	311	1.03	+0.22
Total formal votes		30,111	93.21	–1.16
Informal votes		2,193	6.79	+1.16
Turnout		32,304	84.93	−6.86
Two-candidate-preferred result
Labor	Wade Noonan	19,278	64.10	−10.20
Greens	Janet Rice	10,797	35.90	+35.90
Labor hold		Swing	N/A	

==== 2006 ====
2006 Victorian state election: Williamstown
Party	Candidate	Votes	%	±%
Labor	Steve Bracks	20,010	61.7	−2.9
Liberal	Alan Evers-Buckland	6,706	20.7	+1.9
Greens	Michael Faltermaier	4,008	12.4	+2.2
Family First	Veronica Hayes	1,443	4.4	+4.4
Independent	Wajde Assaf	264	0.8	+0.8
Total formal votes		32,431	94.4	−2.2
Informal votes		1,933	5.6	+2.2
Turnout		34,364	91.8	
Two-party-preferred result
Labor	Steve Bracks	24,066	74.3	−1.4
Liberal	Alan Evers-Buckland	8,346	25.7	+1.4
Labor hold		Swing	−1.4	

==== 2002 ====
2002 Victorian state election: Williamstown
Party	Candidate	Votes	%	±%
Labor	Steve Bracks	21,600	64.6	−1.9
Liberal	Alan Evers-Buckland	6,274	18.8	−10.8
Greens	Michele Finey	3,422	10.2	+10.2
Independent	John Westbury	2,122	6.3	+6.3
Total formal votes		33,418	96.6	+0.2
Informal votes		1,178	3.4	−0.2
Turnout		34,596	92.2	
Two-party-preferred result
Labor	Steve Bracks	25,295	75.7	+7.6
Liberal	Alan Evers-Buckland	8,114	24.3	−7.6
Labor hold		Swing	+7.6	

=== Elections in the 1990s ===
==== 1999 ====
1999 Victorian state election: Williamstown
Party	Candidate	Votes	%	±%
Labor	Steve Bracks	20,468	66.7	+2.8
Liberal	Alan Evers-Buckland	8,877	28.9	−4.3
Independent	Noel Dyson	1,341	4.4	+4.4
Total formal votes		30,686	96.4	−0.2
Informal votes		1,155	3.6	+0.2
Turnout		31,841	92.3	
Two-party-preferred result
Labor	Steve Bracks	21,011	68.5	+2.9
Liberal	Alan Evers-Buckland	9,671	31.5	−2.9
Labor hold		Swing	+2.9	

==== 1996 ====
1996 Victorian state election: Williamstown
Party	Candidate	Votes	%	±%
Labor	Steve Bracks	19,440	63.9	+5.3
Liberal	Jeff Bird	10,116	33.3	+4.1
Natural Law	Yasmin Horsham	845	2.8	+2.8
Total formal votes		30,401	96.6	+2.3
Informal votes		1,069	3.4	−2.3
Turnout		31,470	92.7	
Two-party-preferred result
Labor	Steve Bracks	19,926	65.6	+1.4
Liberal	Jeff Bird	10,454	34.4	−1.4
Labor hold		Swing	+1.4	

==== 1994 by-election ====
1994 Williamstown state by-election
Party	Candidate	Votes	%	±%
Labor	Steve Bracks	15,362	57.5	−1.2
Democrats	Lyn Allison	6,252	23.4	+23.4
Independent	Chris McConville	5,109	19.1	+19.1
Total formal votes		26,723	94.1	−0.3
Informal votes		1,684	5.9	+0.3
Turnout		28,407	85.7	−9.0
Two-candidate-preferred result
Labor	Steve Bracks	16,309	61.0	−3.1
Democrats	Lyn Allison	10,410	39.0	+39.0
Labor hold		Swing	N/A	

==== 1992 ====
1992 Victorian state election: Williamstown
Party	Candidate	Votes	%	±%
Labor	Joan Kirner	17,167	58.7	−7.5
Liberal	Jeff Bird	8,543	29.2	+2.2
Independent	Vern Hughes	1,299	4.4	+4.4
Independent	Paul Holmes	1,218	4.2	+4.2
Independent	Daniel Cumming	1,038	3.5	+3.5
Total formal votes		29,265	94.3	+1.0
Informal votes		1,755	5.7	−1.0
Turnout		31,020	94.6	
Two-party-preferred result
Labor	Joan Kirner	18,734	64.2	−7.0
Liberal	Jeff Bird	10,465	35.8	+7.0
Labor hold		Swing	−7.0	

=== Elections in the 1980s ===
==== 1988 ====
1988 Victorian state election: Williamstown
Party	Candidate	Votes	%	±%
Labor	Joan Kirner	17,154	63.29	−5.48
Liberal	Stuart Mackley	8,181	30.18	−1.05
Independent	Richard Kirby	1,770	6.53	+6.53
Total formal votes		27,105	93.92	−2.27
Informal votes		1,756	6.08	+2.27
Turnout		28,861	92.41	−0.87
Two-party-preferred result
Labor	Joan Kirner	18,338	67.72	−1.05
Liberal	Stuart Mackley	8,743	32.28	+1.05
Labor hold		Swing	−1.05	

==== 1985 ====
1985 Victorian state election: Williamstown
Party	Candidate	Votes	%	±%
Labor	Gordon Stirling	19,014	68.8	+0.6
Liberal	David Allan	8,633	31.2	+5.3
Total formal votes		27,647	96.2	
Informal votes		1,094	3.8	
Turnout		28,741	93.3	
Labor hold		Swing	−2.8	

==== 1982 ====
1982 Victorian state election: Williamstown
Party	Candidate	Votes	%	±%
Labor	Gordon Stirling	18,245	68.2	+1.4
Liberal	Paul Carter	6,913	25.9	−7.3
Democrats	Peter Dalton	1,578	5.9	+5.9
Total formal votes		26,736	95.7	+0.8
Informal votes		1,198	4.3	−0.8
Turnout		27,934	94.3	+0.2
Two-party-preferred result
Labor	Gordon Stirling	19,152	71.6	+4.8
Liberal	Paul Carter	7,584	28.4	−4.8
Labor hold		Swing	+4.8	

=== Elections in the 1970s ===
==== 1979 ====
1979 Victorian state election: Williamstown
Party	Candidate	Votes	%	±%
Labor	Gordon Stirling	17,612	66.8	+3.8
Liberal	Peter Morris	8,758	33.2	−3.8
Total formal votes		26,370	94.9	+0.8
Informal votes		1,403	5.1	−0.8
Turnout		27,773	94.1	+1.2
Labor hold		Swing	+3.8	

==== 1976 ====
1976 Victorian state election: Williamstown
Party	Candidate	Votes	%	±%
Labor	Gordon Stirling	16,221	63.0	+2.7
Liberal	Wallace Feeney	9,514	37.0	+4.8
Total formal votes		25,735	94.1	
Informal votes		1,609	5.9	
Turnout		27,344	92.9	
Labor hold		Swing	+1.9	

==== 1973 ====
1973 Victorian state election: Williamstown
Party	Candidate	Votes	%	±%
Labor	Gordon Stirling	16,744	59.8	−4.0
Liberal	John Coughlin	9,090	32.5	+9.5
Democratic Labor	Norman Way	2,146	7.7	−5.5
Total formal votes		27,980	95.4	−0.4
Informal votes		1,362	4.6	+0.4
Turnout		29,342	94.5	−0.1
Two-party-preferred result
Labor	Gordon Stirling	17,066	61.0	−4.8
Liberal	John Coughlin	10,914	39.0	+4.8
Labor hold		Swing	−4.8	

==== 1970 ====
1970 Victorian state election: Williamstown
Party	Candidate	Votes	%	±%
Labor	Larry Floyd	16,322	63.8	+2.4
Liberal	Richard Groom	5,880	23.0	+10.1
Democratic Labor	Norman Way	3,389	13.2	−8.3
Total formal votes		25,591	95.8	+0.6
Informal votes		1,111	4.2	−0.6
Turnout		26,702	94.8	+0.8
Two-party-preferred result
Labor	Larry Floyd	16,831	65.8	−2.6
Liberal	Richard Groom	8,760	34.2	+2.6
Labor hold		Swing	−2.6	

=== Elections in the 1960s ===
==== 1967 ====
1967 Victorian state election: Williamstown
Party	Candidate	Votes	%	±%
Labor	Larry Floyd	14,591	61.4	0.0
Democratic Labor	John Bacon	5,113	21.5	+3.9
Liberal	Robert Lawson	3,077	12.9	−7.2
Communist	Ian Daykin	999	4.2	+3.3
Total formal votes		23,780	95.2	
Informal votes		1,205	4.8	
Turnout		24,985	94.0	
Two-party-preferred result
Labor	Larry Floyd	16,257	68.4	+3.8
Liberal	Robert Lawson	7,523	31.6	−3.8
Labor hold		Swing	+3.8	

- The two candidate preferred vote was not counted between the Labor and DLP candidates for Williamstown.

==== 1964 ====
1964 Victorian state election: Williamstown
Party	Candidate	Votes	%	±%
Labor	Larry Floyd	11,145	65.7	−4.5
Liberal and Country	Robert Lawson	3,046	18.0	+6.9
Democratic Labor	Kenneth Berrie	2,351	13.9	−1.1
Communist	William Tregear	410	2.4	+2.4
Total formal votes		16,952	96.9	0.0
Informal votes		535	3.1	0.0
Turnout		17,487	94.5	+0.7
Two-party-preferred result
Labor	Larry Floyd	11,866	70.0	−5.4
Liberal and Country	Robert Lawson	5,086	30.0	+5.4
Labor hold		Swing	−5.4	

==== 1961 ====
1961 Victorian state election: Williamstown
Party	Candidate	Votes	%	±%
Labor	Larry Floyd	12,236	70.2	+1.7
Democratic Labor	John Twomey	2,703	15.5	+1.3
Liberal and Country	Neil McNeill	1,929	11.1	−3.6
Communist	William Smith	570	3.3	+0.6
Total formal votes		17,438	96.9	−1.0
Informal votes		563	3.1	+1.0
Turnout		18,001	93.8	−0.7
Two-party-preferred result
Labor	Larry Floyd	13,154	75.4	+2.4
Liberal and Country	Neil McNeill	4,284	24.6	−2.4
Labor hold		Swing	+2.4	

- The two candidate preferred vote was not counted between the Labor and DLP candidates for Williamstown.

=== Elections in the 1950s ===
==== 1958 ====
1958 Victorian state election: Williamstown
Party	Candidate	Votes	%	±%
Labor	Larry Floyd	12,734	68.5	
Liberal and Country	Joy Head	2,728	14.7	
Democratic Labor	Edward Purchase	2,641	14.2	
Communist	William Tregear	492	2.7	
Total formal votes		18,595	97.9	
Informal votes		403	2.1	
Turnout		18,998	94.5	
Two-party-preferred result
Labor	Larry Floyd	13,573	73.0	
Liberal and Country	Joy Head	5,022	27.0	
Labor hold		Swing		

- Two party preferred vote was estimated.

==== 1955 ====
1955 Victorian state election: Williamstown
Party	Candidate	Votes	%	±%
Labor	Larry Floyd	11,690	63.3	
Liberal and Country	James Wilkie	3,918	21.2	
Labor (A-C)	Herbert Stackpoole	2,846	15.4	
Total formal votes		18,454	98.6	
Informal votes		263	1.4	
Turnout		18,717	94.9	
Two-party-preferred result
Labor	Larry Floyd	12,117	65.6	
Liberal and Country	James Wilkie	6,337	34.4	
Labor hold		Swing		

==== 1952 ====
1952 Victorian state election: Williamstown
Party	Candidate	Votes	%	±%
Labor	John Lemmon	16,673	64.9	−0.3
Independent	Ernest Jackson	5,472	21.3	+21.3
Communist	Alexander Dobbin	3,559	13.8	+4.9
Total formal votes		25,704	98.0	−0.8
Informal votes		525	2.0	+0.8
Turnout		26,229	94.0	−1.3
Two-candidate-preferred result
Labor	John Lemmon	18,453	71.8	−1.4
Independent	Ernest Jackson	7,251	28.2	+28.2
Labor hold		Swing	N/A	

==== 1950 ====
1950 Victorian state election: Williamstown
Party	Candidate	Votes	%	±%
Labor	John Lemmon	16,560	65.2	+1.8
Liberal and Country	Bruce Edwards	6,571	25.9	−0.8
Communist	Alex Dobbin	2,264	8.9	+8.9
Total formal votes		25,395	98.8	−0.2
Informal votes		308	1.2	+0.2
Turnout		25,703	95.3	+0.3
Two-party-preferred result
Labor	John Lemmon	18,598	73.2	+1.9
Liberal and Country	Bruce Edwards	6,797	26.8	−1.9
Labor hold		Swing	+1.9	

=== Elections in the 1940s ===
==== 1947 ====
1947 Victorian state election: Williamstown
Party	Candidate	Votes	%	±%
Labor	John Lemmon	15,901	63.4	+12.3
Liberal	Clifford Rankine	6,697	26.7	+5.1
Independent Labor	George Paine	2,492	9.9	+9.9
Total formal votes		25,090	99.0	+0.7
Informal votes		264	1.0	−0.7
Turnout		25,354	95.0	+5.1
Labor hold		Swing	N/A	

- Preferences were not distributed.

==== 1945 ====
1945 Victorian state election: Williamstown
Party	Candidate	Votes	%	±%
Labor	John Lemmon	11,421	51.1	
Communist	Alexander Dobbin	6,091	27.3	
Liberal	William Gray	4,828	21.6	
Total formal votes		22,340	98.3	
Informal votes		381	1.7	
Turnout		22,721	89.9	
Labor hold		Swing		

- Preferences were not distributed.

==== 1943 ====
1943 Victorian state election: Williamstown
Party	Candidate	Votes	%	±%
Labor	John Lemmon	13,526	57.9	−1.4
Independent	George Paine	9,846	42.1	+1.4
Total formal votes		23,372	98.4	−0.3
Informal votes		382	1.6	+0.3
Turnout		23,754	89.7	−3.7
Labor hold		Swing	−1.4	

==== 1940 ====
1940 Victorian state election: Williamstown
Party	Candidate	Votes	%	±%
Labor	John Lemmon	13,279	59.3	−1.7
Independent	George Payne	9,119	40.7	+40.7
Total formal votes		22,398	98.7	−0.3
Informal votes		303	1.3	+0.3
Turnout		22,701	93.4	−2.6
Labor hold		Swing	N/A	

=== Elections in the 1930s ===
==== 1937 ====
1937 Victorian state election: Williamstown
Party	Candidate	Votes	%	±%
Labor	John Lemmon	13,534	61.0	−39.0
United Australia	James Gray	8,660	39.0	+39.0
Total formal votes		22,194	99.0	
Informal votes		233	1.0	
Turnout		22,427	96.0	
Labor hold		Swing	N/A	

==== 1935 ====
1935 Victorian state election: Williamstown
Party	Candidate	Votes	%	±%
Labor	John Lemmon	unopposed		
Labor hold		Swing		

==== 1932 ====
1932 Victorian state election: Williamstown
Party	Candidate	Votes	%	±%
Labor	John Lemmon	11,367	55.7	−44.3
Independent	George Paine	6,161	30.2	+30.2
Independent	Ernest Jackson	2,874	14.1	+14.1
Total formal votes		20,402	98.1	
Informal votes		398	1.9	
Turnout		20,800	95.3	
Labor hold		Swing	N/A	

- Preferences were not distributed.

=== Elections in the 1920s ===
==== 1929 ====
1929 Victorian state election: Williamstown
Party	Candidate	Votes	%	±%
Labor	John Lemmon	unopposed		
Labor hold		Swing		

==== 1927 ====
1927 Victorian state election: Williamstown
Party	Candidate	Votes	%	±%
Labor	John Lemmon	13,626	71.7	
Nationalist	Francis Wilcher	5,375	28.3	
Total formal votes		19,001	99.0	
Informal votes		195	1.0	
Turnout		19,196	94.2	
Labor hold		Swing		

==== 1924 ====
1924 Victorian state election: Williamstown
Party	Candidate	Votes	%	±%
Labor	John Lemmon	unopposed		
Labor hold		Swing		

==== 1921 ====
1921 Victorian state election: Williamstown
Party	Candidate	Votes	%	±%
Labor	John Lemmon	unopposed		
Labor hold		Swing		

==== 1920 ====
1920 Victorian state election: Williamstown
Party	Candidate	Votes	%	±%
Labor	John Lemmon	unopposed		
Labor hold		Swing		

=== Elections in the 1910s ===
==== 1917 ====
1917 Victorian state election: Williamstown
Party	Candidate	Votes	%	±%
Labor	John Lemmon	6,565	72.3	
Nationalist	George Greenslade	2,517	27.7	
Total formal votes		9,082	95.3	
Informal votes		453	4.7	
Turnout		9,535	43.0	
Labor hold		Swing	N/A	

==== 1914 ====
1914 Victorian state election: Williamstown
Party	Candidate	Votes	%	±%
Labor	John Lemmon	unopposed		
Labor hold		Swing		

==== 1911 ====
1911 Victorian state election: Williamstown
Party	Candidate	Votes	%	±%
Labor	John Lemmon	7,020	74.3	−3.8
Liberal	John Packer	2,431	25.7	+3.8
Total formal votes		9,547	98.9	−0.8
Informal votes		106	1.1	+0.8
Turnout		9,557	59.4	+10.7
Labor hold		Swing	−3.8	
