= Results of the 1976 Victorian state election (Legislative Council) =

Australian state election results

Victorian state election, 20 March 1976 Legislative Council << 1973–1979 >>
Enrolled voters	2,267,282				
Votes cast	2,102,674		Turnout	92.7	–0.8
Informal votes	65,997		Informal	3.1	+0.7
Summary of votes by party
Party	Primary votes	%	Swing	Seats won	Seats held
Liberal	988,681	48.3	+5.2	15	26
Labor	872,076	42.6	+1.8	5	9
National	160,708	7.9	+1.5	2	5
Democratic Labor	12,601	0.6	–8.1	0	0
Australia	2,611	0.1	–0.9	0	0
Independent	10,127	0.5	*	0	0
Total	2,046,804			22	40

This is a list of Legislative Council results for the Victorian 1976 state election. 22 of the 40 seats were contested.

== Results by province ==
=== Ballarat ===
1976 Victorian state election: Ballarat Province
Party	Candidate	Votes	%	±%
Liberal	Rob Knowles	45,545	58.9	
Labor	Ronald Corbett	31,783	41.1	
Total formal votes		77,328	97.4	
Informal votes		2,056	2.6	
Turnout		79,384	95.0	
Liberal hold		Swing		

=== Bendigo ===
1976 Victorian state election: Bendigo Province
Party	Candidate	Votes	%	±%
Labor	Elaine Knight	26,652	34.4	
Liberal	Bruce Reid	25,863	33.4	
National	Michael Clarke	21,821	28.1	
Democratic Labor	Ronald Gane	3,206	4.1	
Total formal votes		77,542	98.0	
Informal votes		1,604	2.0	
Turnout		79,146	95.3	
Two-party-preferred result
Liberal	Bruce Reid	47,153	60.8	
Labor	Elaine Knight	30,389	39.2	
Liberal hold		Swing		

=== Boronia ===
1976 Victorian state election: Boronia Province
Party	Candidate	Votes	%	±%
Liberal	Kevin Foley	59,075	57.4	
Labor	Stuart Russell	43,847	42.6	
Total formal votes		102,922	97.1	
Informal votes		3,032	2.9	
Turnout		105,954	93.0	
Liberal hold		Swing		

=== Central Highlands ===
1976 Victorian state election: Central Highlands Province
Party	Candidate	Votes	%	±%
Liberal	Jock Granter	37,876	49.3	
Labor	Max McDonald	27,876	36.3	
National	Pat McNamara	8,465	11.0	
Independent	Peter Brown	2,611	3.4	
Total formal votes		76,828	97.4	
Informal votes		2,048	2.6	
Turnout		78,876	92.1	
Two-party-preferred result
Liberal	Jock Granter		60.7	
Labor	Max McDonald		39.3	
Liberal hold		Swing		

- Two party preferred vote was estimated.

=== Chelsea ===
1976 Victorian state election: Chelsea Province
Party	Candidate	Votes	%	±%
Liberal	Neil Stacey	53,970	51.2	
Labor	Michael Duffy	51,521	48.8	
Total formal votes		105,491	96.8	
Informal votes		3,512	3.2	
Turnout		109,003	92.5	
Liberal hold		Swing		

=== Doutta Galla ===
1976 Victorian state election: Doutta Galla Province
Party	Candidate	Votes	%	±%
Labor	Bill Landeryou	58,121	53.6	
Liberal	Rex Webb	50,384	46.4	
Total formal votes		108,505	95.7	
Informal votes		4,926	4.3	
Turnout		113,431	93.8	
Labor hold		Swing		

=== East Yarra ===
1976 Victorian state election: East Yarra Province
Party	Candidate	Votes	%	±%
Liberal	Haddon Storey	66,998	64.8	
Labor	Robert Gurry	36,306	35.2	
Total formal votes		103,304	97.7	
Informal votes		2,428	2.3	
Turnout		105,732	91.8	
Liberal hold		Swing		

=== Geelong ===
1976 Victorian state election: Geelong Province
Party	Candidate	Votes	%	±%
Liberal	Glyn Jenkins	41,401	52.5	
Labor	Rod Mackenzie	37,413	47.5	
Total formal votes		78,814	96.9	
Informal votes		2,544	3.1	
Turnout		81,358	95.7	
Liberal hold		Swing		

=== Gippsland ===
1976 Victorian state election: Gippsland Province
Party	Candidate	Votes	%	±%
Labor	Eric Kent	28,096	38.2	
Liberal	James Taylor	21,769	29.6	
National	John Vinall	18,796	25.5	
Democratic Labor	Leslie Hilton	4,941	6.7	
Total formal votes		73,602	97.8	
Informal votes		1,683	2.2	
Turnout		75,285	93.3	
Two-party-preferred result
Liberal	James Taylor	42,238	57.4	
Labor	Eric Kent	31,364	42.6	
Liberal gain from Labor		Swing		

=== Higinbotham ===
1976 Victorian state election: Higinbotham Province
Party	Candidate	Votes	%	±%
Liberal	Murray Hamilton	65,031	63.1	
Labor	Russell Shearn	39,696	37.9	
Total formal votes		104,727	97.6	
Informal votes		2,566	2.4	
Turnout		107,293	92.9	
Liberal hold		Swing		

=== Melbourne ===
1976 Victorian state election: Melbourne Province
Party	Candidate	Votes	%	±%
Labor	Ivan Trayling	58,113	57.8	
Liberal	Bryce McNair	42,483	42.2	
Total formal votes		100,596	95.2	
Informal votes		5,119	4.8	
Turnout		105,715	85.8	
Labor hold		Swing		

=== Melbourne North ===
1976 Victorian state election: Melbourne North Province
Party	Candidate	Votes	%	±%
Labor	John Walton	65,513	63.5	
Liberal	Geoff Lutz	37,629	36.5	
Total formal votes		103,142	95.1	
Informal votes		5,356	4.9	
Turnout		108,498	91.6	
Labor hold		Swing		

=== Melbourne West ===
1976 Victorian state election: Melbourne West Province
Party	Candidate	Votes	%	±%
Labor	Bon Thomas	60,144	59.9	
Liberal	Peter Stirling	40,339	40.2	
Total formal votes		100,483	94.9	
Informal votes		5,407	5.1	
Turnout		105,890	92.2	
Labor hold		Swing		

=== Monash ===
1976 Victorian state election: Monash Province
Party	Candidate	Votes	%	±%
Liberal	James Guest	65,408	64.7	
Labor	Johan Hulskamp	35,660	35.3	
Total formal votes		101,068	96.9	
Informal votes		3,189	3.1	
Turnout		104,257	89.9	
Liberal hold		Swing		

=== North Eastern ===
1976 Victorian state election: North Eastern Province
Party	Candidate	Votes	%	±%
National	David Evans	41,836	53.5	
Labor	Lewis Lee	18,782	24.0	
Liberal	George Ikinger	17,638	22.5	
Total formal votes		78,256	97.3	
Informal votes		2,208	2.7	
Turnout		80,464	94.4	
Two-party-preferred result
National	David Evans		72.6	
Labor	Lewis Gee		27.4	
National hold		Swing		

- Two party preferred vote was estimated.

=== North Western ===
1976 Victorian state election: North Western Province
Party	Candidate	Votes	%	±%
National	Bernie Dunn	37,083	51.2	
Liberal	William Armstrong	21,627	29.9	
Labor	Edward McCormack	13,686	18.9	
Total formal votes		72,396	97.7	
Informal votes		1,711	2.3	
Turnout		74,107	94.3	
Two-candidate-preferred result
National	Bernie Dunn		66.3	
Liberal	William Armstrong		33.7	
National hold		Swing		

- Two candidate preferred vote was estimated.

=== Nunawading ===
1976 Victorian state election: Nunawading Province
Party	Candidate	Votes	%	±%
Liberal	Vernon Hauser	65,006	60.2	
Labor	John Madden	43,049	39.8	
Total formal votes		108,055	97.6	
Informal votes		2,612	2.4	
Turnout		110,667	93.6	
Liberal hold		Swing		

=== South Eastern ===
1976 Victorian state election: South Eastern Province
Party	Candidate	Votes	%	±%
Liberal	Roy Ward	35,254	45.6	
Labor	Merton Ryan	22,434	29.0	
National	William Gleeson	15,159	19.6	
Democratic Labor	Noel Gleeson	4,454	5.8	
Total formal votes		77,301	98.0	
Informal votes		1,598	2.0	
Turnout		78,899	92.6	
Two-party-preferred result
Liberal	Roy Ward	51,347	66.4	
Labor	Merton Ryan	25,954	33.6	
Liberal hold		Swing		

=== Templestowe ===
1976 Victorian state election: Templestowe Province
Party	Candidate	Votes	%	±%
Liberal	Ralph Howard	60,572	57.8	
Labor	Pauline Toner	44,172	42.2	
Total formal votes		104,744	97.6	
Informal votes		2,516	2.4	
Turnout		107,260	93.0	
Liberal hold		Swing		

=== Thomastown ===
1976 Victorian state election: Thomastown Province
Party	Candidate	Votes	%	±%
Labor	Dolph Eddy	62,466	61.2	
Liberal	John Fletcher	39,546	38.8	
Total formal votes		102,012	95.5	
Informal votes		4,851	4.5	
Turnout		106,863	93.3	
Labor hold		Swing		

=== Waverley ===
1976 Victorian state election: Waverley Province
Party	Candidate	Votes	%	±%
Liberal	Don Saltmarsh	59,058	57.2	
Labor	Anthony Scarcella	44,146	42.8	
Total formal votes		103,204	96.5	
Informal votes		3,754	3.5	
Turnout		106,958	93.3	
Liberal hold		Swing		

=== Western ===
1976 Victorian state election: Western Province
Party	Candidate	Votes	%	±%
Liberal	Bruce Chamberlain	36,209	47.4	
Labor	Thomas Windsor	22,600	29.6	
National	Linden Cameron	17,548	23.0	
Total formal votes		76,357	98.4	
Informal votes		1,277	1.6	
Turnout		77,634	95.2	
Two-party-preferred result
Liberal	Bruce Chamberlain	52,214	68.4	
Labor	Thomas Windsor	24,143	31.6	
Liberal hold		Swing		

== See also ==
- 1976 Victorian state election
- Candidates of the 1976 Victorian state election
- Members of the Victorian Legislative Council, 1976–1979
