= Mike Arnold =

Australian politician

Michael John Arnold (born 13 February 1944) is a former Australian politician.

Arnold was born in Melbourne, Australia to fitter and turner Lewis William Arnold and Joyce Kathleen Miller. He attended St Joseph's School in West Brunswick and then Essendon Christian Brothers College before graduating from Melbourne University with a Bachelor of Law. He became a solicitor's clerk in Swan Hill in 1965 and was accepted as a solicitor in 1966, establishing a practice in inner Melbourne. On 29 April 1967 he married Kerrie Constance McNamara; they had three daughters, but they divorced in 1988. In 1969 Arnold joined the Labor Party, eventually becoming secretary of the Essendon branch and in 1982 he became president of the Heidelberg branch.

In 1982 Arnold was elected to the Victorian Legislative Council as the member for Templestowe, serving until his defeat in 1988. In 1987 he had gained a Diploma of Public Policy, and in 1990 he was appointed a Judge of the Accident Compensation Tribunal, serving until 1992. From 2000 to 2004 he was the National Panel Chair of the Insurance Ombudsman Service, and from 2004 to 2005 held the same position with the Financial Industry Complaints Service.

Victorian Legislative Council
Preceded by Ralph Howard	Member for Templestowe; 1982–1988; Served alongside: Vasey Houghton; John Miles	Succeeded by Bruce Skeggs
