= Vernon Christie =

Australian politician

Sir Vernon Howard Colville Christie (17 December 1909 – 4 November 1994) was an Australian politician.

Christie was born in Manly to accountant Colville Christie and Ilma Marion Allen. He was the grand-nephew of New South Wales politician Sir Arthur Renwick. The family travelled a great deal, and Christie was educated at Mount Morgan in Queensland, Hobart in Tasmania and at North Sydney Boys' High School. From 1928 he was a pastoral inspector for Australian Estates Company in west Queensland, becoming a sales manager from 1931. On 24 October 1936 he married Joyce Crozet Hamlin, with whom he had three children. He moved to Melbourne in 1939 and became executive assistant director of Aircraft Production; he was later director of Webb Brothers (from 1944) and Auto Cultivators Ltd (1944–45), as well as having a senior role in several other companies.

In 1955 Christie was elected to the Victorian Legislative Assembly as the Liberal and Country Party member for Ivanhoe. In 1956 he was Chairman of Committees, holding that post until 1961 and again from 1965 to 1967. He was elected Speaker in 1967, and held the post until his retirement from politics in 1973. Knighted in 1972, he retired to Queensland after leaving politics. Christie died in 1994.

Victorian Legislative Assembly
Preceded by Sir William McDonald	Speaker of the Victorian Legislative Assembly; 1967–1973	Succeeded by Kenneth Wheeler
Preceded by Michael Lucy	Member for Ivanhoe; 1955–1973	Succeeded by Bruce Skeggs
