= Robert Gardner (Victorian politician) =

Australian politician and community organiser

Robert Arthur Gardner (20 November 1916 – 2002) was an Australian politician and community organiser.

He was born in Carlton to accountant Robert Stanley Gardner and Dorothy Elizabeth Jones. He attended Melbourne High School and Melbourne University, becoming a journalist. He edited the Caulfield Mercury from 1937 to 1939 and in 1939 was inaugural general secretary of the Opportunity Club. On 2 May 1942 he married Joyce Olver, with whom he had three sons. In 1945 he was elected to the Victorian Legislative Assembly as the independent member for Ivanhoe, but he was defeated in 1947. He was later secretary of the Town and Country Planning Association of Victoria (1951–64, 1968–70) and its president from 1972 to 1975. He held a wide variety of other positions in local community and business groups.

Victorian Legislative Assembly
New seat	Member for Ivanhoe; 1945–1947	Succeeded by Rupert Curnow
