= 1976 Victorian state election =

State election in Australia

- 20 March 1976

All 81 seats in the Victorian Legislative Assembly and 22 (of the 44) seats in the Victorian Legislative Council 41 seats needed for a majority
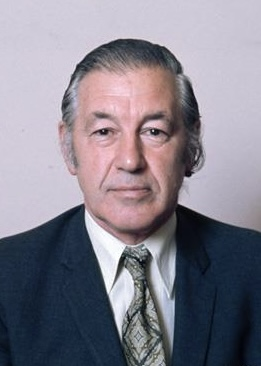

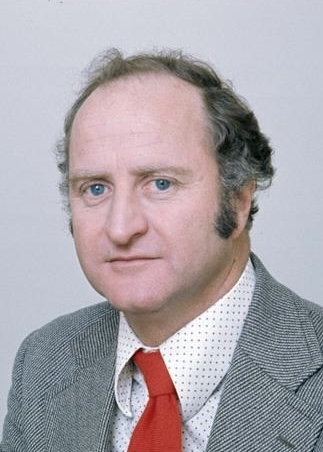

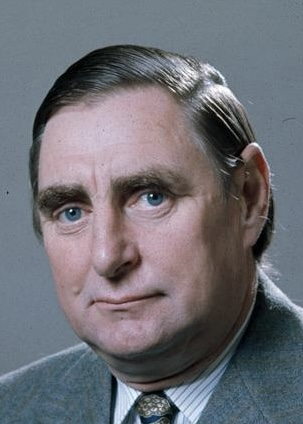
| | First party | Second party | Third party |
|---|---|---|---|
| Leader | Rupert Hamer | Clyde Holding | Peter Ross-Edwards |
| Party | Liberal | Labor | National |
| Leader since | 23 August 1972 | 15 May 1967 | 17 June 1970 |
| Leader's seat | Kew | Richmond | Shepparton |
| Last election | 46 | 18 | 8 |
| Seats won | 52 | 21 | 7 |
| Seat change | ▲6 | ▲3 | ▼1 |
| Popular vote | 939,481 | 869,021 | 144,818 |
| Percentage | 45.87% | 42.43% | 7.07% |
| Swing | ▲3.53 | ▲0.82 | ▲1.13 |
| TPP | 55.77% | 44.23% |
| TPP swing | ▲0.53 | ▼0.53 |
- Results in each electorate.
Premier before election
Rupert Hamer
Liberal
Elected Premier
Rupert Hamer
Liberal

The 1976 Victorian state election, held on Saturday, 20 March 1976, was for the 47th Parliament of Victoria. It was held in the Australian state of Victoria to elect 81 members of the state's Legislative Assembly and 22 members of the 44-member Legislative Council. Since the previous election, there was an increase in the number of members of the Legislative Assembly by 8 and in the number of Council members by 8, though only 4 were elected at the 1976 election.

Since the last election, the number of Legislative Assembly members was increased from 73 to 81 and the number of seats in the Legislative Council was increased from 36 to 44.

The incumbent Liberal government led by Rupert Hamer was returned with an increased majority. This was the eighth consecutive election win for the Liberals. As of 2026, no other party of government has won an eighth consecutive election.

Future Premier Jeff Kennett entered parliament at this election.

The Democratic Labor Party saw a further decrease in its support.

== Results ==
=== Legislative Assembly ===
| Party | Votes | % | +/– | Seats | +/– |
|---|---|---|---|---|---|
| Liberal | 939,481 | 45.87 | ▲3.53 | 52 | ▲6 |
| Labor | 869,021 | 42.43 | ▲0.82 | 21 | ▲3 |
| National | 144,818 | 7.07 | ▲1.13 | 7 | ▼1 |
| Democratic Labor | 52,765 | 2.58 | ▼5.22 | 0 | Steady |
| Australia | 3,430 | 0.17 | ▼1.45 | 0 | Steady |
| Workers | 3,074 | 0.15 | New | 0 | Steady |
| Independents | 35,408 | 1.73 | ▲1.18 | 1 | Steady |
| Total | 2,047,997 | 100.00 | – | 81 | – |
| Valid votes | 2,047,997 | 97.46 | | | |
| Invalid/blank votes | 53,417 | 2.54 | ▼0.36 | | |
| Total votes | 2,101,414 | 100.00 | – | | |
| Registered voters/turnout | 2,267,282 | 92.68 | ▼0.86 | | |
Two-party-preferred
| Liberal | 1,142,262 | 55.77 | ▲0.53 | | |
| Labor | 905,735 | 44.23 | ▼0.53 | | |
| Total | 2,047,997 | 100.00 | – | | |

=== Legislative Council ===
Victorian state election, 20 March 1976 Legislative Council << 1973–1979 >>
| Enrolled voters | 2,267,282 | | | | |
| Votes cast | 2,102,674 | | Turnout | 92.7 | –0.8 |
| Informal votes | 65,997 | | Informal | 3.1 | +0.7 |
Summary of votes by party
| Party | Primary votes | % | Swing | Seats won | Seats held |
| Liberal | 988,681 | 48.3 | +5.2 | 15 | 26 |
| Labor | 872,076 | 42.6 | +1.8 | 5 | 9 |
| National | 160,708 | 7.9 | +1.5 | 2 | 5 |
| Democratic Labor | 12,601 | 0.6 | –8.1 | 0 | 0 |
| Australia | 2,611 | 0.1 | –0.9 | 0 | 0 |
| Independent | 10,127 | 0.5 | * | 0 | 0 |
| Total | 2,046,804 | | | 22 | 40 |

== Seats changing hands ==
| Seat | Pre-1976 | | | Swing | Post-1976 | | |
| Seat | Party | Member | Margin | Swing | Margin | Member | Party |
|---|---|---|---|---|---|---|---|
| Benambra | National | Tom Mitchell | 19.9 | -21.7 | 1.8 | Lou Lieberman | Liberal |
| Knox | Liberal | notional - new seat | 0.8 | -2.1 | 1.3 | Steve Crabb | Labor |
| Ripon | Labor | notional - new seat | 0.4 | -10.3 | 9.9 | Tom Austin | Liberal |
| Werribee | Labor | notional - new seat | 0.2 | -0.2 | 0.05 | Neville Hudson | Liberal |

== Post-election pendulum ==
Liberal seats (52)
Marginal
| Essendon | Kenneth Wheeler | LIB | 0.05% |
| Werribee | Neville Hudson | LIB | 0.05% |
| Oakleigh | Alan Scanlan | LIB | 1.3% |
| Geelong East | Bruce Evans | LIB | 1.5% |
| Benambra | Lou Lieberman | LIB | 1.8% v NAT |
| Greensborough | Monte Vale | LIB | 2.7% |
| Bendigo | Daryl McClure | LIB | 3.6% |
| Ballarat South | Bill Stephen | LIB | 4.1% |
| Springvale | Norman Billing | LIB | 4.4% |
| Geelong West | Hayden Birrell | LIB | 5.2% |
| Heatherton | Llew Reese | LIB | 5.4% |
| Mitcham | George Cox | LIB | 5.5% |
| Prahran | Sam Loxton | LIB | 5.7% |
Fairly safe
| Noble Park | Peter Collins | LIB | 6.1% |
| St Kilda | Brian Dixon | LIB | 6.1% |
| Syndal | Geoff Coleman | LIB | 6.1% |
| Monbulk | Bill Borthwick | LIB | 6.6% |
| Sandringham | Max Crellin | LIB | 7.4% |
| Glenhuntly | Joe Rafferty | LIB | 8.1% |
| Ringwood | Peter McArthur | LIB | 9.0% |
| Bentleigh | Bob Suggett | LIB | 9.3% |
| Box Hill | Donald Mackinnon | LIB | 9.6% |
| Evelyn | Jim Plowman | LIB | 9.6% |
| Ripon | Tom Austin | LIB | 9.9% |
Safe
| Bennettswood | Ian McLaren | LIB | 10.1% |
| Narracan | Jim Balfour | LIB | 10.2% |
| Swin Hill | Alan Wood | LIB | 10.2% v NAT |
| Warrandyte | Norman Lacy | LIB | 10.6% |
| Hawthorn | Walter Jona | LIB | 10.7% |
| Midlands | Bill Ebery | LIB | 10.7% |
| Mentone | Bill Templeton | LIB | 10.9% |
| Ivanhoe | Bruce Skeggs | LIB | 11.1% |
| Lowan | Jim McCabe | LIB | 11.7% v NAT |
| Ballarat North | Tom Evans | LIB | 11.9% |
| Frankston | Graeme Weideman | LIB | 12.7% |
| Dromana | Roberts Dunstan | LIB | 12.9% |
| South Barwon | Aurel Smith | LIB | 13.0% |
| Forest Hill | John Richardson | LIB | 13.1% |
| Gisborne | Athol Guy | LIB | 14.2% |
| Burwood | Jeff Kennett | LIB | 14.6% |
| Portland | Don McKellar | LIB | 14.7% |
| Berwick | Rob Maclellan | LIB | 15.1% |
| Warrnambool | Ian Smith | LIB | 15.2% |
| Caulfield | Charles Francis | LIB | 15.3% |
| Wantirna | Geoff Hayes | LIB | 15.8% |
| Doncaster | Morris Williams | LIB | 15.9% |
| Westernport | Doug Jennings | LIB | 16.3% |
| Brighton | Jeannette Patrick | LIB | 18.1% |
| Balwyn | Jim Ramsay | LIB | 19.3% |
| Kew | Rupert Hamer | LIB | 20.0% |
| Malvern | Lindsay Thompson | LIB | 20.8% |
| Polwarth | Cec Burgin | LIB | 26.6% |

Labor seats (21)
Marginal
| Knox | Steve Crabb | ALP | 1.3% |
| Niddrie | Jack Simpson | ALP | 2.0% |
| Bundoora | John Cain | ALP | 3.3% |
| Carrum | Ian Cathie | ALP | 5.0% |
| Dandenong | Alan Lind | ALP | 5.2% |
Fairly safe
| Glenroy | Jack Culpin | ALP | 8.9% |
Safe
| Keilor | Jack Ginifer | ALP | 10.2% |
| Geelong North | Neil Trezise | ALP | 12.6% |
| Williamstown | Gordon Stirling | ALP | 13.0% |
| Albert Park | Val Doube | ALP | 13.1% |
| Broadmeadows | John Wilton | ALP | 13.2% |
| Ascot Vale | Tom Edmunds | ALP | 13.3% |
| Morwell | Derek Amos | ALP | 13.6% |
| Reservoir | Jim Simmonds | ALP | 14.1% |
| Northcote | Frank Wilkes | ALP | 14.2% |
| Brunswick | Tom Roper | ALP | 14.7% |
| Melbourne | Barry Jones | ALP | 14.8% |
| Preston | Carl Kirkwood | ALP | 15.8% |
| Footscray | Robert Fordham | ALP | 21.6% |
| Sunshine | Bill Fogarty | ALP | 21.6% |
| Richmond | Theo Sidiropoulos | ALP | 23.3% |
National seats (7)
| Gippsland South | Neil McInnes | NAT | 1.3% v LIB |
| Benalla | Tom Trewin | NAT | 20.1% |
| Gippsland East | Bruce Evans | NAT | 20.7% v IND |
| Murray Valley | Ken Jasper | NAT | 22.1% |
| Mildura | Milton Whiting | NAT | 24.2% |
| Shepparton | Peter Ross-Edwards | NAT | 27.7% |
| Rodney | Eddie Hann | NAT | 33.1% |
Crossbench seats (1)
| Coburg | Jack Mutton | IND | 5.3% v ALP |

== See also ==
- Candidates of the 1976 Victorian state election
