= 2007 Williamstown state by-election =

By-election in the Victorian Legislative Assembly

- 15 September 2007

Electoral district of Williamstown in the Victorian Legislative Assembly
- Registered: 38,034
- Turnout: 84.93% (▼6.86)

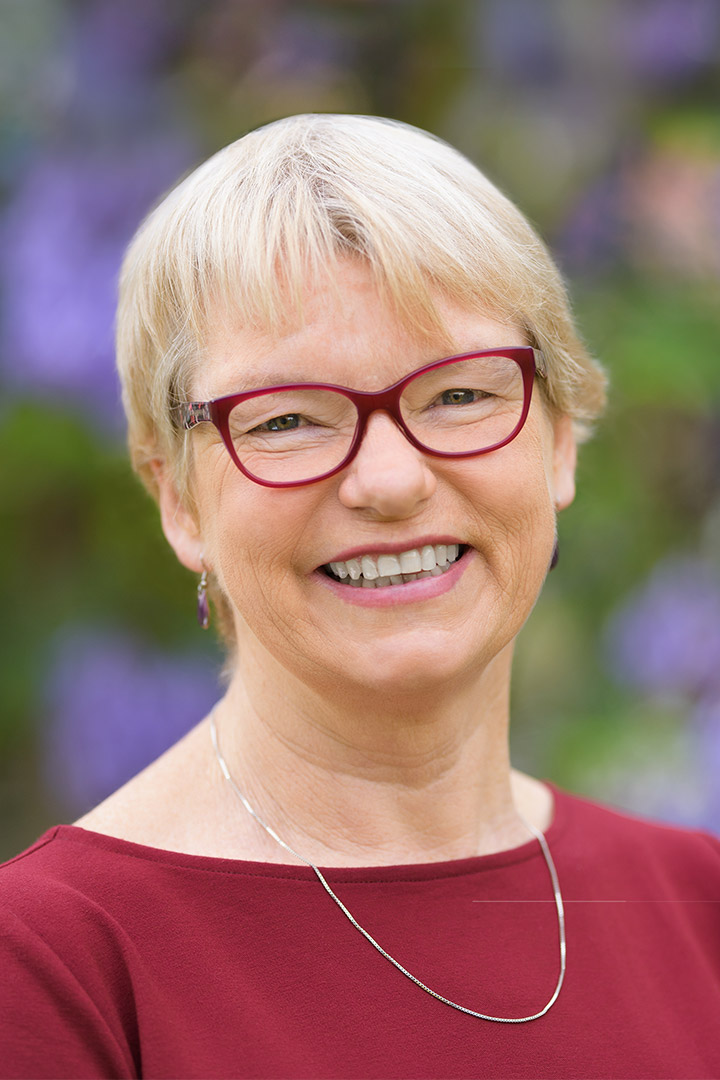

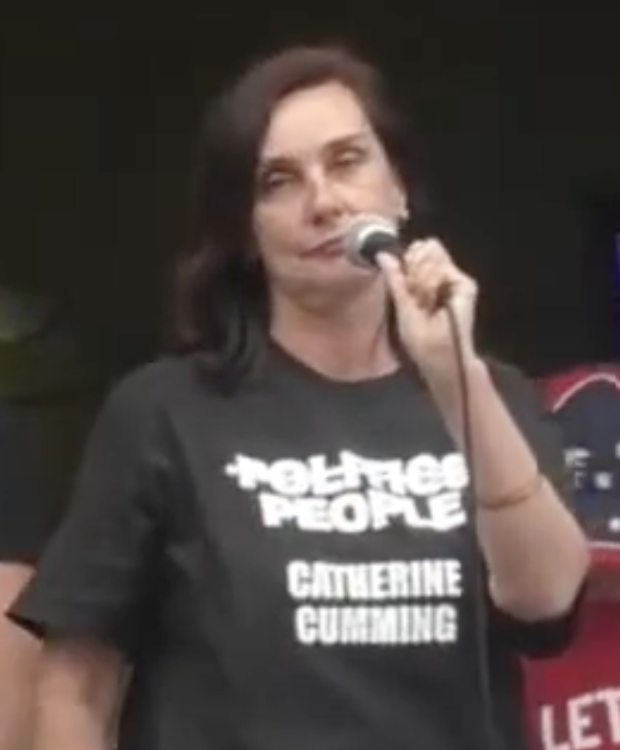
	First party	Second party	Third party
Candidate	Wade Noonan	Janet Rice	Catherine Cumming
Party	Labor	Greens	Independent
Primary vote	16,775	6,592	2,703
Percentage	55.74%	21.90%	8.98%
Swing	▼5.96	▲9.54	▲8.98
TCP	64.10%	35.90%
TCP swing	▼10.20	▲35.90
MP before election
Steve Bracks
Labor
Elected MP
Wade Noonan
Labor

The 2007 Williamstown state by-election was held on 15 September 2007 to elect the member for Williamstown in the Victorian Legislative Assembly, following the resignation of sitting MP and former premier Steve Bracks on 30 July 2007.

Bracks had held the seat since 1994, and had been leader of the state Labor Party since 1999, serving as Premier from 1999 to 2007. Williamstown is generally considered a safe seat for the ALP, and Bracks' predecessor in the seat, Joan Kirner, was also a former Premier.

With the resignation of Premier Steve Bracks on 30 July 2007, a by-election was required. On 4 August 2007 Janet Rice was confirmed to be the candidate for The Greens; the previous day (3 August 2007) the Liberal Party had confirmed that they would not run a candidate. This left Janet Rice as the person most likely to displace an ALP candidate, although she would need to greatly improve upon the vote that the Greens received in the 2006 state election. Former Transport Workers Union of Australia assistant secretary Wade Noonan held the seat for Labor.

== Results ==
2007 Williamstown state by-election
Party	Candidate	Votes	%	±%
Labor	Wade Noonan	16,775	55.74	–5.96
Greens	Janet Rice	6,592	21.90	+9.54
Independent	Catherine Cumming	2,703	8.98	+8.98
Family First	Veronica Hayes	1,472	4.89	+0.44
Democratic Labor	Vern Hughes	789	2.59	+2.59
Independent	Janis Rossiter	648	2.15	+2.15
Independent	Vivienne Millington	485	1.61	+1.61
Independent	Nathan Tavendale	331	1.10	+1.10
Independent	Wajde Assaf	311	1.03	+0.22
Total formal votes		30,111	93.21	–1.16
Informal votes		2,193	6.79	+1.16
Turnout		32,304	84.93	−6.86
Two-candidate-preferred result
Labor	Wade Noonan	19,278	64.10	−10.20
Greens	Janet Rice	10,797	35.90	+35.90
Labor hold		Swing	N/A	

== See also ==
- 1994 Williamstown state by-election
