= Lidia Argondizzo =

Australian politician (born 1960)

Lidia Serafina Argondizzo (born 13 October 1960) is an Australian politician. She was the Labor Party (ALP) member of the Victorian Legislative Council representing Templestowe Province from 2002 to 2006.

Argondizzo was born in Italy, but immigrated to Australia as a child. She attended Preston Girls' High School and received an MBA from the Royal Melbourne Institute of Technology. After graduating, she was employed by the Victorian Health Department for several years. It was during this period that Argondizzo was elected as a councillor in the City of Northcote in 1987. She left the Health Department the following year to take up a position as an electorate officer for Giovanni Sgro, an ALP member of the Legislative Council was also in the Party's left-wing.

In 1989, Argondizzo was elected mayor of the City of Northcote, and got a job as an electorate officer with ALP Senator Barney Cooney. She continued on as a councillor until 1993. During this period, she made several unsuccessful attempts to secure ALP preselection for a seat in either State or Federal parliament. At one time she was a member of the splinter Left faction the Pledge Left, where she appeared likely to obtain preselection partly due to the support she received from her brother Frank Argondizzo, a then official at the Vehicle Builders Union. Tensions emerged within the Pledge Left about her candidacy and she was not selected as a result. She returned to the Socialist Left faction soon after.

In 2002, she was chosen as the ALP candidate for the seat of Templestowe Province at the election due later that year. Templestowe was held by a margin of nearly six percent by Deputy Liberal Leader in the Upper House and Shadow Minister for Natural Resources and Energy Carlo Furletti. There was a large swing to the Labor Party at the state election and Argondizzo won as a result, making Furletti one of the major casualties of the election.

She was appointed as the Government Whip in the Legislative Council after the election. She has served on the Library, Legislative Council Standing Orders and Scrutiny of Acts and Regulations Committees.

The Legislative Council was substantially reformed in the leadup to the 2006 state election, and Argondizzo was one of eight incumbent Labor members forced to fit into one new, larger, electorate which would only return a maximum of three for Labor. As a relatively junior member of the government, she did not have priority for one of the winnable Legislative Council seats, and attempted to shift to the Legislative Assembly by contesting the Liberal-held marginal seat of electoral district of Doncaster, then held by the retiring Victor Perton. She was defeated by Mary Wooldridge.
