= Bill Forwood =

Australian politician (born 1946)

William Forwood (born 21 October 1946) was an Australian politician. He was the Liberal member of the Victorian Legislative Council from 1992 to 2006, representing Templestowe Province.

Forwood is now Strategic Counsel for CPR Communications and Public Relations.

== Origins ==
Forwood was born in Adelaide, and began his high school education there, but graduated from the prestigious Geelong Grammar School in Victoria. He studied at the University of Melbourne, and briefly became a journalist with the Herald and Weekly Times. He quickly changed careers however, becoming a manager at a grocery company for several years.

In 1975, Forwood moved to Canberra to work as a public servant. The following year, however, he again changed careers, moving to South Australia to work as a farmer. He returned to a business career in 1980, taking on a position as a merchant banker, and over the next twelve years, worked in a variety of management positions, including being Finance Director of the Victorian Liberal Party.

During the 1980s, Forwood also spent a two-year stint as one of two vice-presidents of the Northern Territory's Country Liberal Party. His stint in this role, shared with future Chief Minister Shane Stone, coincided with the ousting of Chief Minister Ian Tuxworth and the creation of the rival Northern Territory Nationals party, leaving them among those tasked with reuniting a fractured party organisation in its aftermath in 1986–87.

== Legislative Council ==
Forwood won pre-selection for the Legislative Council seat of Templestowe Province at the 1992 election, by defeating a low-profile sitting Liberal MLC, John Miles, and went on to win the seat. In his early years in office, he served stints on the Law Reform and Legislative Council Privileges Committees. In 1996, he was appointed as Chair of the Public Accounts and Estimates Committee, before receiving his first ministerial appointment in 1998, when he was appointed Parliamentary Secretary to the Premier. This was to be relatively short-lived, however, as Liberal Premier Jeff Kennett was defeated in a surprise result the following year.

After the election loss, Forwood was promoted to Shadow Minister for Aboriginal Affairs, Deputy Leader of the Opposition in the Legislative Council, Shadow Minister for Small Business and Consumer Affairs, and Shadow Minister for Tourism. He also continued in his work with the Public Accounts and Estimates Committee - albeit as Deputy Chairman. In 2000, he gained the portfolio of Rural and Regional Development at the expense of Aboriginal Affairs. In 2001, Forwood found himself promoted again, as he succeeded Mark Birrell as Leader of the Opposition in the Legislative Council, and was also made Shadow Minister for Industrial Relations.

The Liberal Party had not been tipped to win the 2002 election, but it became one of the worst results in the party's history, losing an array of seats, including several Shadow Ministers. Forwood was not up for re-election, but he was nevertheless a casualty of the election - in the aftermath of the devastating result, he was dumped as Leader in the Legislative Council in favor of Philip Davis, and also lost the Industrial Relations portfolio. After a brief spell as Shadow Minister for Conservation and Environment, he gained the portfolios of Energy Industries (since renamed to Resources and Energy) and WorkCover in 2002.

In addition to his shadow ministerial portfolios, Forwood was the Deputy Chair of the Public Accounts and Estimates Committee, and sat on the Legislative Council Privileges Committee.

Forwood retired at the 2006 state election.
