= Prince Henry's Hospital =

Prince Henry's Hospital may refer to:

- Prince Henry Hospital, Sydney, Australia, a former teaching hospital
- Prince Henry's Hospital, Melbourne, Australia, a former hospital and research institute
