= John Lemmon (politician) =

Australian politician

The Honourable John Lemmon
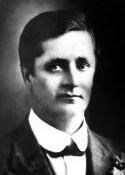

Member of the Victorian Legislative Assembly for Williamstown
- In office 1 June 1904 – 22 April 1955
- Preceded by: Alexander Ramsay
- Succeeded by: Larry Floyd

Minister of Education
- In office 12 December 1929 – 19 May 1932
- Premier: Edmond Hogan
- Preceded by: Henry Cohen
- Succeeded by: John Pennington
- In office 20 May 1927 – 22 November 1928
- Premier: Edmond Hogan
- Preceded by: Sir Alexander Peacock
- Succeeded by: Henry Cohen
- In office 18 July 1924 – 18 November 1924
- Premier: George Prendergast
- Preceded by: Richard Toutcher
- Succeeded by: Sir Alexander Peacock
- In office 9 December 1913 – 22 December 1913
- Premier: George Elmslie
- Preceded by: Sir Alexander Peacock
- Succeeded by: Sir Alexander Peacock

Personal details
- Born: John Lemmon; 15 July 1875 Carlton, Victoria
- Died: 28 October 1955 (aged 80) Hawthorn, Victoria, Australia
- Resting place: Springvale Botanical Cemetery
- Party: Labor Party
- Spouse: Edith Ruddock (m. 1905)
- Children: Nelson Lemmon
- Occupation: Carpenter, tailor

John Lemmon (15 July 1875 – 28 October 1955) was an Australian politician. He served as the Victorian Minister of Education four times. He also served the longest ever term as a member of the Victorian Parliament, being an MLA for over fifty years. This also makes him the longest-serving elected state-level politician in Australian history.

== Early years ==
Lemmon was born in Carlton in the Caretakers Cottage of the Trades Hall Council to English wood turner Samuel Lemmon and his Irish wife Matilda Thompson, Samuel and his wife had the Care Takers role for 50 years between them. Lemmon attended Rathdowne St Primary School, the Trades Hall School and then Working Men's College. He was a carpenter's apprentice for five years joining the Timber Workers' Union at the age of fifteen. Doing the same task on sash windows all the time, he realised that the apprenticeship scheme needed to improve. He changed trades to become a tailors cutter. He opened his own business, “Our Boys” Taylors in about 1901 in Footscray. He closed the business when he was elected to parliament.

On 25 April 1905 he married Edith Ruddock, at Dromana Wesley Church, with whom he had three children.

== Unions ==
Lemmon joined his first union at the age of 15 years. He was vice-president of the Cutters and Trimmers' Union in 1899 when it reorganised in 1899. He became the secretary and in 1905 was elected president of the Victorian Clothing Operatives' Union. From 1900–07 he was a delegate to the Trades Hall Council and from March 1900 he was secretary of the Trades Hall Organising Committee.

== Politics ==
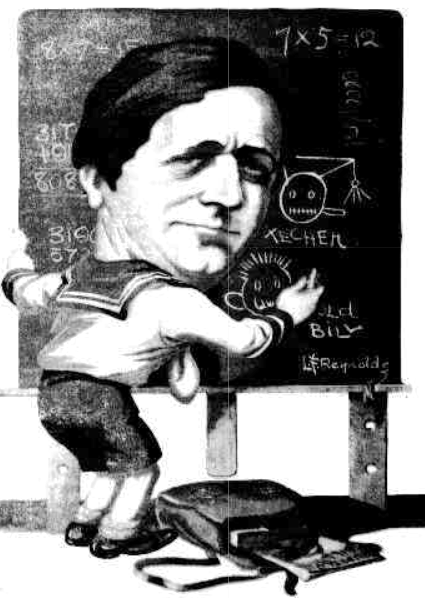

Lemmon sought endorsement as a Labor candidate for the Footscray Victorian Legislative Assembly electorate in 1901 and 1902 and then in 1903 preselection as a Senate candidate. He was unsuccessful in these but gained preselection by labour for the Williamstown electorate.

In 1904 he was elected to the Victorian Legislative Assembly as the Labor member for Williamstown. In December 1913 he was briefly Minister of Public Instruction and Labour, serving again from July to November 1924 and from May 1927 to November 1928. In December 1929 he resumed his old post, serving until March 1932. He was the secretary of the Parliamentary Labor Party from 1913 to 1938. Lemmon held the seat until 1955; the longest term of any member of the Victorian Parliament and in the British Commonwealth, at the time.

Lemmon served as a Royal Commissioner on the enquiry into Murray Waters 1910–11. He also served on the Inquiry into marketing and transportation of grain in 1911 and as a Royal Commissioner in the subsequent inquiry in 1912–13.

He achieved the passage of an Apprenticeship Bill in 1927 that set up an Apprenticeship authority to oversight apprentice training. Until this date apprentice training effectively remained optional for employers. Some did it well and others ignored it.

Lemmon's long term in parliament are attributed to his eye for detail, a strong focus on his parliamentary duties, his deep knowledge of parliamentary standing orders, the support of his wife and the recognition she received for her charitable work.

== Education ==
Education was a driver for himself and for others. If presentations were on offer his preference was a book on politics or economics. He received over 50 books in this way.

He was President of the Working Men's College in 1910 and was the Trade Hall Council representative on the Board until 1924. He was a Member of the University of Melbourne Council in 1932 to 1939. The abolition of school fees by the government he was a member of was one of his successes, but they still existed in High Schools. Lemmon had a long running dispute with the Director of Education, Martin Hansen, about fees and the strategy for delivery of education.

== Australian Natives' Association ==
Lemmon was a member of the Australian Natives' Association (ANA) Carlton Branch Number 49 when he was elected in 1902 to the ANA Board. He was an ANA Board member for 41 years and an ANA Trustee for 31 years. His political career caused him to move to Williamstown where he joined the local ANA Branch No.73. In 1906 he was Vice President and went to WA to promote the Association in Western Australia. In 1911 he was elected Chief President at Warrnambool Annual Conference. He was a member of the ANA for over 50 years.

He was also honorary secretary of the Victorian Association of Friendly Societies and a trustee of the Melbourne Cricket Ground.

== Later years ==
He died of cancer later that year at Hawthorn, His wife, two daughters and a son. His son, Nelson Lemmon, was a minister in the federal Chifley Labor government.

Victorian Legislative Assembly
Preceded by Alexander Ramsay	Member for Williamstown; 1904–1955	Succeeded by Larry Floyd
