= Craig Langdon =

Australian politician

Craig Anthony Cuffe Langdon (born 22 May 1957) is an Australian politician. He was a Labor Party member of the Victorian Legislative Assembly from 1996 until 2010, representing Ivanhoe. He was a social worker before entering politics.

Langdon resigned from the parliament on 25 August 2010, citing family and personal reasons in a statement, but also accusing a number of his colleagues of "disloyalty and betrayal".

Langdon was elected as the Mayor of the Banyule City Council in 2014. Langdon was a Banyule councillor representing Olympia Ward until he was defeated for re-election by Peter Dimarelos in 2020.

Victorian Legislative Assembly
| Preceded by Vin Heffernan | Member for Ivanhoe; 1996–2010 | Succeeded by Anthony Carbines |
