= Ralph Howard (politician) =

Australian politician (1931–2013)

Victorian Legislative Council member for Templestowe Province
- In office 1976–1982

Personal details
- Political party: Liberal Party
- Occupation: Politician, medical practitioner, business executive

Ralph William Howard (17 May 1931 – 19 December 2013) was an Australian politician, serving in the Victorian Legislative Council for Templestowe Province from 1976 to 1982. He also worked as a medical practitioner and business executive.

== Biography ==
He was born in Melbourne to carpenter William Howard and Hazel Ralph. He was educated at Balwyn and Box Hill before attending Scotch College and then Melbourne University, where he received a Master of Business and a Bachelor of Science.

He was a doctor at Footscray Hospital from 1957 to 1958 and at Prince Henry's Hospital from 1958 to 1959, thereafter becoming surgical register in 1959 and dermatologist in 1961. On 21 July 1961 he married Judith Elinor May Vertigan, with whom he had two sons. From 1962 to 1964 he was senior medical officer with the Royal Australian Air Force in Tottenham, and from 1964 to 1965 was assistant general secretary of the Australian Medical Association. From 1965 to 1976 he was medical director for a number of companies.

In 1976 he was elected to the Victorian Legislative Council for Templestowe Province representing the Liberal Party. He ran unsuccessfully for preselection for the lower house seat of Kew in 1981, and was defeated in Templestowe in 1982. He subsequently returned to business, in partnership with fellow defeated politician Graeme Weideman.

Howard died in 2013.

Victorian Legislative Council
Preceded by Raymond Garrett	Member for Templestowe; 1976–1982; Served alongside: Vasey Houghton	Succeeded by Mike Arnold
