= Frank Block (Australian politician) =

Australian politician

Arthur Francis Kelly "Frank" Block (21 June 1899 – 4 March 1971) was an Australian politician.

Born in Echuca to labourer Albert Alfred Block and Annie Kelly, he attended state schools and served in the Australian Imperial Force's 46th Battalion during World War I; he was wounded and sent home to Preston around 1915. Around 1919, he married Louisa Rubena Adelaide Davis, with whom he had six children; he would remarry around 1942 to Vida Winifred Ross. Block, who worked as a building contractor, was a member of the Labor Party in the 1930s but joined the Liberal Party at its formation. He was elected to the Victorian Legislative Assembly in 1951 in a by-election for the seat of Ivanhoe, but was defeated at the next election in 1952. Block died in 1971 at Preston.
