= Larry Floyd (politician) =

Australian politician

Larry Floyd OBE

Member of the Victorian Parliament for Williamstown
- In office 28 May 1955 – 1973
- Preceded by: John Lemmon
- Succeeded by: Gordon Stirling

Personal details
- Born: 13 July 1908 Broken Hill, New South Wales
- Died: 6 October 1999 (aged 91)
- Party: Labor Party
- Occupation: Compositor

William Laurence Floyd OBE (13 July 1908 – 6 October 1999) was an Australian politician.

Floyd was born in Broken Hill to miner William Lawrence Floyd and Jessie Ellen Hank. He was a compositor, and a member of Williamstown City Council from 1945 to 1962.

In 1955 he was elected to the Victorian Legislative Assembly as the Labor member for Williamstown. He was secretary of the parliamentary party from 1961 to 1970 and retired from politics in 1973, in which year he was appointed an Officer of the Order of the British Empire. Floyd, who was unmarried, died in 1999.

Floyd was also secretary of the Williamstown Football Club between 1935 and 1951, and secretary of the Carlton Football Club between 1951 and 1955.

Victorian Legislative Assembly
Preceded by John Lemmon	Member for Williamstown; 1955–1973	Succeeded by Gordon Stirling
