= Alexander Ramsay (Australian politician) =

Australian politician (1863-1925)

Member of the Victorian Legislative Assembly for Williamstown
- In office 1900 – 1 June 1904
- Preceded by: James Styles
- Succeeded by: John Lemmon

Personal details
- Born: 10 October 1863 Williamstown, Victoria
- Died: 2 August 1925 (aged 61) Williamstown, Victoria
- Party: Commonwealth Liberal
- Spouse: Louisa Blyth (m. 1886)
- Occupation: Mechanical engineer

Alexander Gordon Culbert Ramsay (10 October 1863 – 2 August 1925) was an Australian politician, who served in the Victorian Legislative Assembly.

Ramsay was born in Williamstown, Victoria to Scottish-born engineer Alexander Culbert Ramsay and Mary Jane Whan. He worked as a mechanical engineer in Western Australia before returning to Victoria to work for the Vacuum Oil Company. He later served as chairman of an oil company Ramsay and Treganowan, and as a sergeant in the Williamstown Artillery Battery. Around 1886 he married Florence Louisa Blyth.

In 1900 Ramsay was elected to the Victorian Legislative Assembly as the Liberal member for Williamstown, serving two terms until his defeat at the 1904 election. He was also President of the Williamstown Football Club from 1903 to 1906 and a Vice-President in 1907-08. Ramsay died in 1925 at Williamstown.
