= Vin Heffernan =

Australian politician

Vincent Patrick "Vin" Heffernan OAM (24 December 1935 – 15 November 2002) was an Australian politician. In 1983 he was awarded the Medal of the Order of Australia.

== Biography ==
He was born in Ivanhoe to William Francis Heffernan and Mary Ninoe, née Downing. He attended St Thomas Christian Brothers College in Clifton Hill before becoming a motor engineer, builder and property developer.

From 1966 to 1984 he was a Heidelberg City Councillor (he was mayor from 1979 to 1980), and in 1983 he was awarded the Medal of the Order of Australia for his work with youth. In 1985 he was elected to the Victorian Legislative Assembly as the Liberal member for Ivanhoe. He was assistant to the Opposition Leader on Youth Affairs from 1985 to 1988 and Shadow Minister for Small Business from 1991 to 1992 before becoming Minister for Small Business and Minister responsible for Youth Affairs in 1992. He lost his seat in 1996.

Heffernan died in Melbourne in 2002.

Victorian Legislative Assembly
Preceded by Tony Sheehan	Member for Ivanhoe; 1985–1996	Succeeded by Craig Langdon
