= Raymond Garrett =

Australian politician (1900–1994)

Sir Raymond Garrett AFC, AE

President of the Victorian Legislative Council
- In office 20 February 1968 – 19 March 1976
- Preceded by: Sir Ronald Mack
- Succeeded by: William Fry

Member of the Victorian Legislative Council for Templestowe
- In office 20 May 1970 – 19 March 1976 Serving with Vasey Houghton
- Preceded by: New constituency
- Succeeded by: Ralph Howard

Member of the Victorian Legislative Council for Southern
- In office 21 June 1958 – 20 May 1970 Serving with Gilbert Chandler
- Preceded by: Roy Rawson
- Succeeded by: Constituency abolished

Personal details
- Born: 19 October 1900 Kew, Victoria
- Died: 12 October 1994 (aged 93) Box Hill, Victoria
- Party: Liberal Party
- Education: University of Melbourne
- Civilian awards: Knight Bachelor

Military service
- Allegiance: Australia
- Branch/service: Royal Australian Air Force
- Years of service: 1927–1937; 1939–1945
- Rank: Group Captain
- Battles/wars: Second World War
- Military awards: Air Force Cross; Air Efficiency Award

Sir Raymond William Garrett, AFC, AE (19 October 1900 – 12 October 1994) was an Australian pilot, military officer, photographer, and politician. A member of the Liberal Party, Garrett served on the Victorian Legislative Council for eighteen years, and was knighted in 1973.

== Early life and career ==
Garrett was born in Kew, in Melbourne, Victoria. He was educated at Workingman's College (now RMIT University) and the University of Melbourne. At the age of 26, Garrett graduated from flying school at the Royal Australian Air Force base at Point Cook; he became a commercial pilot in 1927, and joined the Citizen Air Force. Garrett later became the first civilian instructor in the CAF. Garrett was as keen on gliding as he was on flying aeroplanes. In 1928, he set a British Empire record for gliding duration. In 1929, he founded the Gliding Club of Victoria.

In 1933, he began working in the Northern Territory for the Larkin Aircraft Company. Flying as the chief pilot for the company, Garrett ran the first Territory-wide mail route, and provided the air links between Darwin and other townships in the territory. In the mid-1930s, Garrett left the Northern Territory and returned to Melbourne, where he tried being a professional photographer. Garrett's interest in photography began in the 1920s, when he was one of the country's first aerial photographers. In 1934, Garrett married Vera Halliday Lugton, with whom he had four children.

When World War II broke out, Garrett was called up into the Royal Australian Air Force. Initially based at RAAF Base Laverton, he moved to Mascot to take up a post as commanding officer of the RAAF training school. He retired from the Air Force in 1945, having achieved the rank of group captain.

After the war, Garrett took his earlier love of photography and set up a successful business in Doncaster, manufacturing photographic chemicals. He later became Chairman of Ilford (Australia) Pty Ltd. Several of his descendants shared his passion, and became professional photographers.

== Politics ==
It was around this time that Garrett also began to dabble in politics, sitting on the council of the Shire of Doncaster and Templestowe for six years. In 1956, Garrett contested—and won—the seat of Southern Province for the Liberals. He served the electorate with distinction, and was elected President of the Victorian Legislative Council in 1968. Southern Province had, by that time, become over-large and difficult to represent, and, after some redistricting, Garrett joined fellow Liberal Vasey Houghton in representing Templestowe Province. He held a seat in Templestowe until his retirement from politics in 1976.

Victorian Legislative Council
Preceded by Roy Rawson	Member for Southern; 1958–1970; Served alongside: Gilbert Chandler	Constituency abolished
New constituency	Member for Templestowe; 1970–1976; Served alongside: Vasey Houghton	Succeeded by Ralph Howard
