= Michael Lucy =

Australian politician (1915–1971)

Michael Francis Lucy (6 November 1915 – 9 January 1971), Australian politician, was a Member of the Victorian Legislative Assembly for the Electoral district of Ivanhoe representing the Labor Party from 1952 to 1955 and the Australian Labor Party (Anti-Communist) (Democratic Labor Party) from March–April 1955.
