= Rupert Curnow =

Australian politician

Rupert Colman Curnow (30 October 1898 – 18 December 1950) was an Australian politician.

Born in Ballarat to schoolteacher Josiah Curnow and Florence Daws, he attended Ballarat Grammar School and studied medicine before he enlisted in the 8th Light Horse in 1914, serving in the Middle East until 1918, when he was wounded. Through the soldier settler program he became a grazier at Corryong, and on 16 November 1923 married Eileen Adeline Purcell, with whom he had two children. In 1934 he moved to Heidelberg, and from 1942 to 1946 was a member of the State Repatriation Board. He was active in the Returned and Services League, serving on the state council (1939–50), the state executive (1941–48), and as vice-president (1945–47). He also served on Upper Murray Shire Council from 1933 to 1935. In 1947 he was elected to the Victorian Legislative Assembly as the Liberal member for Ivanhoe, serving until 1950, when he died at Heidelberg.
