= Templestowe Province =

Former electoral province of the Victorian Legislative Council, Australia

Templestowe Victoria—Legislative Council
- State: Victoria
- Created: 1967
- Abolished: 2006
- Area: 123 km^{2} (47.5 sq mi)
- Demographic: Metropolitan

Templestowe Province was an electorate of the Victorian Legislative Council. It existed as a two-member electorate from 1967 to 2006, with members serving alternating eight-year terms. It was traditionally held by the Liberal Party, but was held by the Labor Party on two occasions: from 1982 to 1988 and again from 2002 to 2006. It was abolished from the 2006 state election in the wake of the Bracks Labor government's reform of the Legislative Council.

It was located in the north-east of Melbourne. In 2002, when it was last contested, it covered an area of 123 km^{2} and included the suburbs of Bulleen, Doncaster, Eltham, Heidelberg, Ivanhoe, Montmorency, Rosanna and Templestowe.

== Members for Templestowe Province ==
| Member 1 | Party | Year | | |
|---|---|---|---|---|
| Vasey Houghton | Liberal | 1967 | Member 2 | Party |
| Vasey Houghton | Liberal | 1970 | Raymond Garrett | Liberal |
| Vasey Houghton | Liberal | 1973 | Raymond Garrett | Liberal |
| Vasey Houghton | Liberal | 1976 | Ralph Howard | Liberal |
| Vasey Houghton | Liberal | 1979 | Ralph Howard | Liberal |
| Vasey Houghton | Liberal | 1982 | Mike Arnold | Labor |
| John Miles | Liberal | 1985 | Mike Arnold | Labor |
| John Miles | Liberal | 1988 | Bruce Skeggs | Liberal |
| Bill Forwood | Liberal | 1992 | Bruce Skeggs | Liberal |
| Bill Forwood | Liberal | 1996 | Carlo Furletti | Liberal |
| Bill Forwood | Liberal | 1999 | Carlo Furletti | Liberal |
| Bill Forwood | Liberal | 2002 | Lidia Argondizzo | Labor |

== Election results ==
2002 Victorian state election: Templestowe Province
| Party | Candidate | Votes | % | ±% |
|---|---|---|---|---|
| Labor | Lidia Argondizzo | 56,952 | 43.5 | +42.1 |
| Liberal | Carlo Furletti | 54,670 | 41.7 | −11.8 |
| Greens | Robyn Roberts | 17,469 | 13.3 | −21.5 |
| Independent | Reginald Temple | 1,079 | 0.8 | +0.8 |
| Hope | Lee-Anne Poynton | 893 | 0.7 | +0.7 |
| Total formal votes | | 131,063 | 96.2 | −0.8 |
| Informal votes | | 5,195 | 3.8 | +0.8 |
| Turnout | | 136,258 | 93.7 | |
Two-party-preferred result
| Labor | Lidia Argondizzo | 70,611 | 53.9 | +9.6 |
| Liberal | Carlo Furletti | 60,452 | 46.1 | −9.6 |
| Labor gain from Liberal | | Swing | +9.6 | |
