= Carlo Furletti =

Australian politician (born 1945)

Victorian Legislative Council
- In office May 1996 – November 2002
- Constituency: Templestowe Province

Personal details
- Born: 1 November 1945 (age 80) Fivizzano, Tuscany, Italy
- Party: Liberal Party
- Spouse: Kaye Mason
- Children: 3
- Occupation: lawyer

Carlo Angelo Furletti (Italian: [ˈkarlo ˈandʒelo furˈlɛtti]; born 1 November 1945) is a former Australian politician. He was a Liberal member of the Victorian Legislative Council from 1996 to 2002, representing Templestowe Province. Born in Italy, he arrived in Australia at the age of four.

He served as Parliamentary Secretary to the Shadow Minister for Multicultural Affairs from 1999 to 2002. He was a Member of the Law Reform Committee 1996-99 and the Legislative Council Privileges Committee 1999–2002.
