= Gordon Stirling =

Australian politician

Member of the Victorian Parliament for Williamstown
- In office 19 May 1973 – 1 August 1988
- Preceded by: Larry Floyd
- Succeeded by: Joan Kirner

Personal details
- Born: 28 December 1924 Geelong, Victoria
- Died: 11 June 1999 (aged 74) Werribee, Victoria
- Party: Labor Party
- Spouse: Betty June Wilson
- Children: Kay and David
- Occupation: Moulder; Naval Petty Officer; Oil refinery operator Union Official

Military service
- Allegiance: Australia
- Branch/service: Royal Australian Navy
- Years of service: 1946 – 1958
- Rank: Petty Officer
- Unit: HMAS Warramunga (I44)
- Battles/wars: Korean War

Gordon Francis Stirling (28 December 1924 – 11 June 1999) was an Australian politician. He was the Labor member for Williamstown in the Victorian Legislative Assembly from 1973 to 1988.

== Career ==
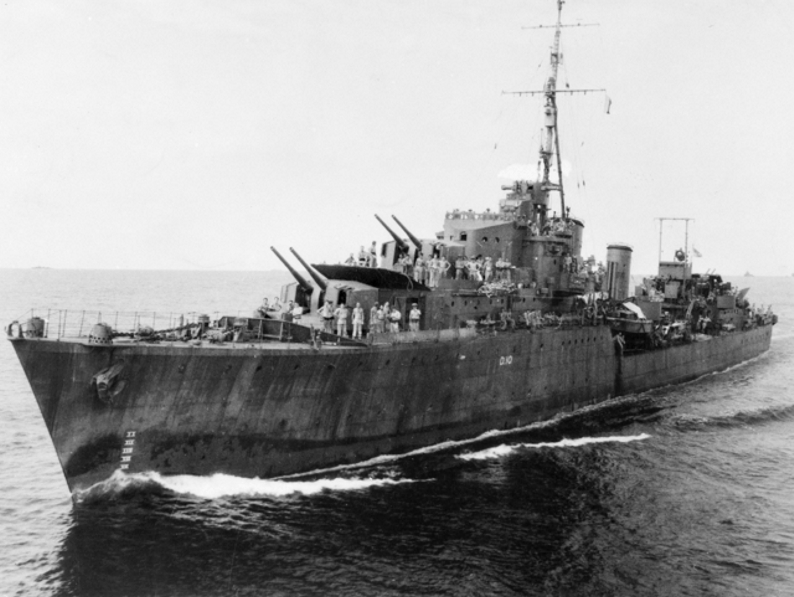
HMAS Warramunga, which Stirling served aboard during the Korean War.

Stirling worked as a moulder before joining the Royal Australian Navy in 1946. He served as an Able Seaman aboard HMAS Warramunga during the Korean War, reached the rank of Petty Officer, then completed his service in 1958. In 1962 he joined the Labor Party.

Stirling's political activity led to a career as a unionist, becoming an official of the Federated Storemen and Packers Union. He was a member of the Australia-USSR Friendship Society as well as the Congress for International Cooperation and Disarmament. He was also involved in the Williamstown Historical Society, the Williamstown branch of the Returned and Services League, and he was a member of the Williamstown Hospital board.

Stirling was elected to the Victorian Electoral district of Williamstown at the 1973 State election, won by the Liberal party under new leader Rupert Hamer. He served on Labor's Public Works Committee from 1976 to 1982 and the Salinity and Printing committees from 1974 to 1983, and was a member of the Victorian Institute of Marine Sciences board. He retired in August 1988, a month before John Cain II's narrow re-election to a third term.

Parliament of Victoria
Preceded by Larry Floyd	Member for Williamstown; 1973–1988	Succeeded by Joan Kirner
