= Electoral district of Williamstown =

State electoral district of Victoria, Australia

Williamstown Victoria—Legislative Assembly
- Interactive map of electoral district boundaries from the 2022 state election
- State: Victoria
- Created: 1856
- MP: Melissa Horne
- Party: Labor Party
- Namesake: Williamstown
- Electors: 45,965 (2022)
- Area: 51.54 km^{2} (19.9 sq mi)
- Demographic: Inner metropolitan

Williamstown is an electoral district of the Legislative Assembly in the Australian state of Victoria. It is a 51.54 km^{2} urban electorate in the inner south-western suburbs of Melbourne, encompassing the suburbs of Brooklyn, Newport, Spotswood, Williamstown, Williamstown North, South Kingsville, Seaholme, Altona and Yarraville. The electorate had a population of 54,426 as of the 2006 census.

Williamstown is one of only three electorates (along with Brighton and Richmond) to have been contested at every election since 1856. It is a very safe seat for the Labor Party, which has held it for all but two terms since 1889 and without interruption since 1904. Notable former members include John Lemmon, who held the seat for a Victorian record 51 years until his retirement in 1955, and former Premiers Joan Kirner and Steve Bracks.

Steve Bracks held the seat from a by-election in 1994 until his surprise resignation on 30 July 2007. A by-election was held on 15 September 2007, resulting in the election of Labor's Wade Noonan.

The seat is almost entirely within the equally safe federal seat of Gellibrand.

== Members for Williamstown ==
Member	Party	Term
John Foster	Independent	1856–1857
George Perry	Independent	1857–1859
George Verdon	Liberal	1859–1868
Thomas Mason	Independent	1868–1871
Alfred Clark	Liberal	1871–1887
James Mirams	Liberal	1887–1889
William Carter	Labor	1889–1894
James Styles	Labor	1894–1900
Alexander Ramsay	Commonwealth Liberal	1900–1904
John Lemmon	Labor	1904–1955
Larry Floyd	Labor	1955–1973
Gordon Stirling	Labor	1973–1988
Joan Kirner	Labor	1988–1994
Steve Bracks	Labor	1994–2007
Wade Noonan	Labor	2007–2018
Melissa Horne	Labor	2018–present

== Election results ==
2022 Victorian state election: Williamstown
Party	Candidate	Votes	%	±%
Labor	Melissa Horne	16,173	41.5	−8.2
Liberal	Daria Kellander	10,928	28.0	+7.7
Greens	Suzette Rodoreda	6,013	15.4	+2.1
Democratic Labour	Rochelle Fisher	1,632	4.2	+4.2
Victorian Socialists	Julien Q. Macandili	1,528	3.9	+3.9
Animal Justice	Patricia Mackevicius	1,049	2.7	+0.5
Freedom	Alexander Ansalone	976	2.5	+2.5
Family First	Joshua Mosely	675	1.7	+1.7
Total formal votes		38,974	95.4	+0.3
Informal votes		1,878	4.6	−0.3
Turnout		40,852	88.9	+2.7
Two-party-preferred result
Labor	Melissa Horne	24,726	63.4	−6.5
Liberal	Daria Kellander	14,248	36.6	+6.5
Labor hold		Swing	−6.5	

== Historical maps ==
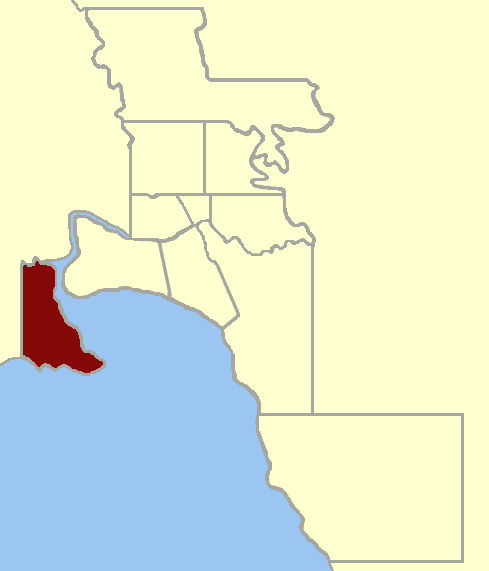
Location within Greater Melbourne area, 1859
