= Electoral district of Ivanhoe =

State electoral district of Victoria, Australia

Ivanhoe Victoria—Legislative Assembly
- Interactive map of electoral district boundaries from the 2022 state election
- State: Victoria
- Created: 1945
- MP: Anthony Carbines
- Party: Labor Party
- Namesake: Ivanhoe
- Electors: 46,777 (2018)
- Area: 31 km^{2} (12.0 sq mi)
- Demographic: Metropolitan

The electoral district of Ivanhoe is an electoral district of the Victorian Legislative Assembly. It is located in the north-eastern suburbs of Melbourne and includes the suburbs of Heidelberg, Heidelberg Heights, Heidelberg West, Bellfield, Ivanhoe, Ivanhoe East, Eaglemont, Rosanna, Viewbank, Yallambie and Macleod.

Formed in 1945 the seat had usually been fairly safe for the Liberal Party having only been won by Labor at its 1952 and 1982 landslides before the 1990s. However a redistribution prior to the 1992 election made the seat notionally Labor. Liberal candidate Vin Heffernan was able to win at that election, only to be one of just three sitting Liberals defeated at the 1996 election. Labor's Craig Langdon held the seat comfortably until he resigned from the parliament on 25 August 2010 - the seat subsequently won by Labor’s Anthony Carbines who has held it since.

== Members for Ivanhoe ==
Member	Party	Term
Robert Gardner	Independent	1945–1947
Rupert Curnow	Liberal	1947–1950
Frank Block	Liberal	1951–1952
Michael Lucy	Labor	1952–1955
Michael Lucy	Labor (Anti-Communist)	1952–1955
Vernon Christie	Liberal	1955–1973
Bruce Skeggs	Liberal	1973–1982
Tony Sheehan	Labor	1982–1985
Vin Heffernan	Liberal	1985–1996
Craig Langdon	Labor	1996–2010
Anthony Carbines	Labor	2010–present

== Election results ==
2022 Victorian state election: Ivanhoe
Party	Candidate	Votes	%	±%
Labor	Anthony Carbines	17,333	42.7	−3.7
Liberal	Bernadette Khoury	12,566	31.0	−1.4
Greens	Emily Bieber	7,808	19.2	+4.5
Family First	Sarah Hayward	1,216	3.0	+3.0
Animal Justice	Sonja Ristevski	937	2.3	+2.3
Independent	Craig Langdon	739	1.8	–3.1
Total formal votes		40,599	96.3	+1.1
Informal votes		1,536	3.7	−1.1
Turnout		42,135	89.7	+0.3
Two-party-preferred result
Labor	Anthony Carbines	25,476	62.8	+0.4
Liberal	Bernadette Khoury	15,123	37.2	−0.4
Labor hold		Swing	+0.4	
