= John Miles (Australian politician) =

Australian politician

John Gould Miles (5 March 1930 – 29 December 2010) was an Australian politician and member of the Victorian Legislative Council for Templestowe Province representing the Liberal Party from April 1985 until his retirement in August 1992. Miles was the grandson of Edward Miles, Tasmanian Free Trade Party politician, Minister for Mines, and Siam (Thailand) tin miner.

Miles was educated at Camberwell Grammar School and the University of Melbourne. He was Senior housemaster at Scotch College from 1954 to 1976. He subsequently served as a Management Consultant prior to entering Parliament. Miles was a life member and former captain and coach of the Hawthorn-East Melbourne Cricket Club.

Miles served on a number of Liberal Party internal committees before entering Parliament. These included the Elliot Committee of Review in 1980–81, the Steering Committee and Party Development Committee from 1981 to 1984 and the Area Conference Development Committee from 1981 to 1984. As a member of Parliament Miles served on the Mortuary Industry and Cemeteries Administration Committee from 1985 to 1988. Miles was an effective speaker. His major parliamentary contributions were related to sport and recreation and public works.
