= Vasey Houghton =

Australian politician, grazier, and conservationist

William Vasey Houghton MLC (3 January 1921 – 11 January 2001), better known as Vasey Houghton, was an Australian politician, grazier, and conservationist. He was one of the longest-serving members of the Victorian State Parliament, spending eighteen years as a Member of the Legislative Council, nine of them on the front bench. Houghton is remembered for his work cleaning up HM Prison Pentridge and the Yarra River.

== Life ==
Houghton was born in Melbourne, the son of solicitor William Sherwood Houghton and Doris Thackery. He attended Melbourne Grammar School and spent a year at the University of Melbourne studying law, but his studies were interrupted by the outbreak of World War II. At the time he had also been working as an articled clerk in his father's law firm, Mills, Oakley and McKay. From 1940 until 1945 he served in the Australian Imperial Force, earning promotion to the rank of Lieutenant in 1942. When he returned to Australia in 1945, he decided not to return to the law, instead setting up as a farmer near Yarra Glen. In 1948, he married Audrey Gourlay.

After retiring from politics in 1985, Houghton concentrated on his family and his work as a farmer. He died in 2001, eight days after his eightieth birthday. At Houghton's funeral, former Victorian Premier Lindsay Thompson praised him for his conservation work, telling mourners that "That probably proved to be the best $6 million the government spent that year because [Labor planning minister] Evan Walker took up the project and Southbank is now one of Melbourne's great assets." The funeral was held 16 January 2001 in St Peter's Chapel, at Melbourne Grammar.

The "Vasey Houghton Bridge," a bridge on the Melba Highway across the Yarra River, was named in his honour and opened on 23 January 1999.

== Political career ==
In 1967, Houghton ran for the Victorian Legislative Council, obtaining a seat in the new Templestowe Province. He served on the council for fifteen years, and in that time was Minister for Social Welfare (1973); Health (1976–1979); and, from 1980 to 1985, the portfolios of Conservation, Lands, and Soldier Settlement. He was also Parliamentary Secretary to the Cabinet before moving onto Social Welfare.

Today, Houghton is best-remembered for his work cleaning up HM Prison Pentridge and the Yarra River. As Minister for Social Welfare, he successfully worked to abolish "C" division of the gaol, which at the time was known as the "Hell division". He told reporters at the time, "Prisoners are not rough, tough hooligans. Most of the occupants of prison are inadequate, pitiful people." In 1980 he was appointed chairman of a parliamentary committee to investigate pollution in the Yarra River and the possible cleanup of what he described as the "depressed, ramshackle buildings" along the southern bank of the river. As a result of his work, the Victorian Government spent six million Australian dollars cleaning up the area.
