= Bruce Skeggs =

Australian politician

Bruce Albert Edward Skeggs OAM (11 October 1932 – 21 March 2013) was a longstanding Australian Victorian Parliamentarian who was equally famous for his career as a race-caller. He was a Liberal member of the Victorian Legislative Assembly from 1973 to 1982, representing Ivanhoe. He was the Liberal member of the Legislative Council from 1988 to 1996, representing Templestowe Province.

== Early life ==
Born in Cremorne, Sydney, Skeggs started singing professionally when he was a schoolboy. While a student at Katoomba, New South Wales, he learned voice production and microphone technique and enjoyed singing with bands conducted by his mother, Ethel. At age 11, he won a talent contest called Australia's Amateur Hour and the local paper ran a story likening him to Nelson Eddy. Bruce got singing engagements, mainly entertaining sick and wounded soldiers, during World War II. Following his mother's untimely death, Skeggs was raised by his mother's relatives in Sydney for at least two years, and then by his father's relatives in Adelaide. He attended Nailsworth Technical School in South Australia where he was educated to intermediate level. Through his uncle, Bob Skeggs, who trained pacers and trotters, Skeggs developed a lifelong interest in harness racing. He often assisted his uncle in training the horses on the beach. As a teenager he appeared on the Quiz Kids program, conducted by John Dees on the Adelaide radio station 5DN. At age 16, he won a cartooning contest run by the Adelaide News afternoon tabloid. He moved to Melbourne seeking work as a cartoonist with Smith's Weekly.

== Trotting & Harness Racing ==
In Melbourne, he met World War I veteran, Albert "Vic" Smith, editor of The Guide, a weekly racing and trotting form guide. Smith, a nephew of the Smith's Weekly publisher Sir Joynton Smith, hired Skeggs to work on the form guides, becoming like a second son. Skeggs' next big break came in the same year when he was covering a trotting meeting at Boort in Victoria. The course commentator failed to arrive for work and there was a call for a volunteer; Skeggs – being no stranger to microphones – offered his services.

As a trotting commentator from 1948–1982, and the official Trotting Control Board Victoria commentator from 1955–1982, Skeggs called 20 Inter Dominion Championships and a world record 34,000 trotting races. The Inter Dominion Hall of Fame website refers to him as the "“Voice of Victorian Trotting” for more than 30 years."

He was a winner of the Australian Harness Racing Awards Joseph Coulter Media Award.

Skeggs was a long-standing committeeman of the Cranbourne Harness Racing Club and was President from 1991 to 1997, with his name perpetuated by the running of the annual Bruce Skeggs Trotters Cup. He also served on the executive of the Victorian Country Clubs Association from 1991 to 1996 and was a foundation member and President of the Caduceus Club.

On the international stage, Skeggs was a Chairman of the World Publicity and Promotion Committee of the International Trotting Association from 1972 to 1987, edited the periodical World Trot Press, and also developed and promoted extensive international affiliations for Australian harness racing, particularly in Europe. He also served as Honorary Public Relations Officer for the AHRC from 1972 to 1997 and the Inter Dominion Harness Racing Council.

In 1995, Skeggs received the AHRC's Distinguished Service Award, and also a Media Award for radio commentaries, and in 1998 he was awarded the Inter Dominion Gold Medal.

In 2007, he was an inaugural inductee into HRA's Inter Dominion Hall of Fame, and in 2009 he was an inaugural inductee into the Victorian Harness Racing Media Association's Hall of Fame.

== Journalism ==
Skeggs worked as a journalist at The Argus and Farm and Home from 1950 to 1956, and was the founding editor of TV Week from 1956 to 1960. He established Cabon Publishing Company Pty Ltd in 1960, and was the chairman and managing director, and editor and publisher of the Year Book of Australian Trotting 1960–1961. He was also the editor of the Australian Trotting Register from 1960 to 2005.

== Politics and Parliamentary life ==
Skeggs became active in the Liberal Party in the 1950s. He was a Member of the Victorian State Executive 1960–1973, Secretary and Treasurer of the Liberal Speakers Group 1961–1971, President of the Liberal Speakers Group 1971–1976, Secretary of the Fawkner Park branch and the Fawkner Federal Ectorate committee 1962–1970. He was Chairman of the Batman Federal Electorate committee 1969–1973 and President of the Heidelberg branch from 1972–1973 and 1982–1988.

Skeggs was the political commentator on Radio 3XY between 1963 and 1974.

He ran as the Liberal candidate in the Batman Federal Electorate in 1961, 1963, and 1966.

He was elected Member of the Legislative Assembly (MLA) for Ivanhoe in 1973 and served till he was defeated in the 1982 election. His Committee service included Trustee Companies Bill Committee 1973–1974; Statute Law Revision committee 1976–1982; and the Library committee 1976–1979.

He was elected Member of the Legislative Council (MLC) for Templestowe in the 1988 election and served till he retired in 1996. A loyal monarchist, in 1992 he called on the newly elected Kennett Government to reinstate Royal Honours.

He was Deputy Chairman of the Scrutiny of Acts and Regulations Committee. He played an important role in the Review of the Equal Opportunity Act. and producing a consensus report later incorporated into legislation. Speaking in the Parliament about the balance he struck, he said,

The most contentious area of the legislation concerns lawful sexual activity. It is certainly difficult for a Parliament to legislate on moral grounds. Many people want Parliaments to do this, but I believe morals are largely regulated by the community: the family, church leaders and, to a somewhat disturbing extent, the media. In many cases the media influences public morality, and not always in a desirable manner. I say that as one who has had a lifetime experience in the media and is concerned by trends from time to time in the public media that have the capacity to change the moral outlook of society. The real test of a tolerant society must be whether something is just. Is it a just society; is it a just law? I do not recognise homosexual and lesbian relationships as an acceptable alternative lifestyle, but the issue is one of basic justice and human rights in general. Should homosexuals, lesbians or even heterosexuals suffering from discrimination be prevented from employment, accommodation or access to and services? All people should have the right to work and the right to shelter. If a person is refused the right to work, he or she is basically being denied the fundamental right to eat. If you cannot earn, you cannot eat – unless you are assisted by social services. That is not an acceptable way for many people to go through life. People want to have the right to work. In human rights terms it comes down to a matter of fundamental justice.

Skeggs sat on many inquiries including The Review of the Trade Unions Act 1958. Following a meeting at the House of Lords, Skeggs reported in a volume entitled Discussions with the Select Committee on the Scrutiny of Delegated Powers, House of Lords, Westminster

== Local Government ==
In local government Skeggs was a long term City of Heidelberg councillor, including a year as Mayor in 1990–91. In addition to these formal duties, Skeggs lent his weight to countless community projects, not the least being the establishment and management of the community radio station 96.5 Inner FM.

== Freedom and Human Rights ==
Very active in anti-communist and human rights movements, he was President of the Freedom Coalition from 1984 to 1994. He was the National President of the World Freedom League of Australia from 1994 to 2010. He served on the Executive of the World League for Freedom and Democracy (WLFD). During a WLFD conference in New York, Skeggs was witness to one of the biggest stories of the century: the 11 September terrorist attacks on the World Trade Centre. He watched the whole thing unfold from his hotel window about 3 kilometres away.

He was the Council Chairman of the Asian Pacific League for Freedom and Democracy (APLFD), an international private organisation founded in 1954 in Chinhae, South Korea, for the promotion of prosperity and peace in the region. Under his chairmanship, Australia hosted the APLFD annual conference three times: 1993 in Melbourne, 1997 in Melbourne and in 1999 in Brisbane. Through such international gatherings, he brought together the people of Australia, the Asians, and the Pacific island people into one big family of freedom loving people. He is indeed a champion of freedom and democracy.

In 1991, he exercised his conscience vote in the Victorian Parliament to vote against the Community Protection (Amendment) Bill otherwise known as the Garry David Bill. In his speech Skeggs said,

I am no apologist for Garry David, also known as Garry Webb, but I am a stoic defender of the pure principles of justice.... Fortunately the constitution of the Victorian Parliamentary Liberal Party gives each member of it the right to exercise a vote of conscience where a position of principle is conscientiously and sincerely held. Currently I am the president of both the Australian Chapter of the World Freedom League and the Freedom Coalition in Victoria. Both of those bodies are dedicated to upholding the principles of the United Nations Universal Declaration of Human Rights and to working for freedom and democracy in all nations. In short, they are dedicated to upholding the human rights of all peoples. Accordingly I cannot support any legislation that alienates the fundamental principles of justice.

In 1991, Skeggs participated in the UN World Conference on Human Rights in Vienna in 1993. Speaking in the Parliament in 1995, he said

A couple of years ago I had the opportunity of attending a United Nations conference on human rights in Vienna. I was absolutely appalled by what I heard and saw at one of the conference hearings on discrimination against women when evidence was given by many women who had undergone tremendous physical violence and sexual harassment. Many of the hundreds of people who heard that evidence were in tears as they listened to the horrific accounts by women from many countries. Even in Western countries, including the USA, England and other so-called enlightened democracies, women had been subjected to the most unbelievable harassment and indignities. Honourable members would really have to see the video of that session or read the evidence to understand what goes on behind some closed doors. It is almost impossible to believe women can suffer so much and be subjected to unspeakable indignities over long periods. I found that very moving indeed. It made me more convinced than ever to do all I could to ensure that sexual harassment within society was suppressed and that women's rights were given the recognition they deserve.

== Volunteer: Freemasonry, the Anglican Church and Other Causes ==
Bruce was a Freemason and served as Deputy Grand Master of the United Grand Lodge of Victoria.

Bruce served the vestry of St George’s Anglican Church, Ivanhoe where he compiled the Golden Jubilee history of the church.

For decades, Bruce was the Master of Ceremonies at the Ivanhoe RSL ANZAC day ceremony.

He served as the President of the Royal Society of St George (Australia)

He served as the Victorian Prior of the Sovereign Order of St John of Jerusalem.

== Honours ==
In addition to the racing honours mentioned above, Skeggs was awarded the Queen Elizabeth II Silver Jubilee Medal.

National recognition of Skeggs' contribution to the Australian community came in October 2000 when he was invested with the Medal of the Order of Australia (OAM) for "service to harness racing, to the Victorian Parliament and local government, and to the community."

Skeggs was also awarded the Friends of Overseas Chinese Medal by the Republic of China.

== Family ==
Bruce was married to Evelyn (née Gronn) in 1958. They had four children – Philip, Julie, Robbie and Margaret. In his last years, Skeggs was cared for in a Melbourne nursing home, and retained a love of racing and radio to the end.
