= Electoral results for the district of Rodney =

Australian district election results

This is a list of electoral results for the Electoral district of Rodney in Victorian state elections.

== Members for Rodney ==
Member	Party	Term
John Baragwanath	Unaligned	1856–1857
John Everard	Liberal	1858–1859
Wilson Gray	Liberal	1860–1862
John MacGregor	Unaligned	1862–1874
Simon Fraser	Unaligned	1874–1883
Duncan Gillies	Unaligned	1877–1889
James Shackell	Conservative	1883–1892
William Webb	Unaligned	1889–1897
Timothy Murphy	Liberal	1892–1894
Andrew White	Unaligned	1894–1897
John Mason	Liberal	1897–1902
John Morrissey	Liberal	1897–1904
Samuel Lancaster	Conservative	1902–1904
Hugh McKenzie	Independent	1904–1917
Hugh McKenzie	Commonwealth Liberal	1904–1917
Hugh McKenzie	Nationalist	1904–1917
John Allan	Country	1917–1936
William Dunstone	Country	1936–1944
Richard Brose	Country	1944–1964
Russell McDonald	Country	1964–1973
Eddie Hann	Country	1973–1975
Eddie Hann	National Country	1975–1982
Eddie Hann	National	1982–1989
Noel Maughan	National	1989–2006
Paul Weller	National	2006–2014

== Election results ==
=== Elections in the 2010s ===
2010 Victorian state election: Rodney
Party	Candidate	Votes	%	±%
National	Paul Weller	20,524	62.71	+22.55
Labor	Vanessa Langford	5,290	16.16	−1.97
Country Alliance	Gino D'Angelo	3,697	11.30	+11.30
Family First	Serena Moore	1,872	5.72	+2.33
Greens	Ian Christoe	1,348	4.12	+0.92
Total formal votes		32,731	95.59	+0.82
Informal votes		1,509	4.41	−0.82
Turnout		34,240	93.97	−0.34
Two-party-preferred result
National	Paul Weller	24,947	76.16	+21.96
Labor	Vanessa Langford	7,809	23.84	+23.84
National hold		Swing	+21.96	

=== Elections in the 2000s ===
2006 Victorian state election: Rodney
Party	Candidate	Votes	%	±%
National	Paul Weller	12,799	40.2	+5.9
Liberal	Neil Repacholi	10,135	31.8	+1.6
Labor	Nicola Castleman	5,778	18.1	−7.4
Family First	Paul Edward	1,079	3.4	+3.4
Greens	Beck Lowe	1,019	3.2	−1.2
Independent	Tony Murphy	681	2.1	+2.1
Independent	Jeff Simmons	377	1.2	+1.2
Total formal votes		31,868	94.8	−2.0
Informal votes		1,757	5.2	+2.0
Turnout		33,625	94.3	
Two-party-preferred result
National	Paul Weller	23,841	74.8	+8.4
Labor	Nicola Castleman	8,026	25.2	−8.4
Two-candidate-preferred result
National	Paul Weller	17,334	54.4	−5.6
Liberal	Neil Repacholi	14,534	45.6	+5.6
National hold		Swing	−5.6	

2002 Victorian state election: Rodney
Party	Candidate	Votes	%	±%
National	Noel Maughan	11,040	34.3	−22.1
Liberal	Simon Frost	9,723	30.2	+26.8
Labor	Malcolm McCullough	8,212	25.5	−4.6
Independent	Greg Toll	1,812	5.6	+5.6
Greens	Peter Williams	1,414	4.4	+4.2
Total formal votes		32,201	96.8	−1.0
Informal votes		1,071	3.2	+1.0
Turnout		33,272	94.6	
Two-party-preferred result
National	Noel Maughan	21,380	66.4	+2.1
Labor	Malcolm McCullough	10,807	33.6	−2.1
Two-candidate-preferred result
National	Noel Maughan	19,305	60.0	−4.3
Liberal	Simon Frost	12,896	40.0	+40.0
National hold		Swing	−4.3	

=== Elections in the 1990s ===
1999 Victorian state election: Rodney
Party	Candidate	Votes	%	±%
National	Noel Maughan	18,329	60.8	−2.8
Labor	Malcolm McCullough	8,565	28.4	+8.7
One Nation	Dorothy Hutton	3,257	10.8	+10.8
Total formal votes		30,151	97.8	−0.6
Informal votes		692	2.2	+0.6
Turnout		30,843	94.8	
Two-party-preferred result
National	Noel Maughan	19,793	65.6	−10.5
Labor	Malcolm McCullough	10,358	34.4	+10.5
National hold		Swing	−10.5	

1996 Victorian state election: Rodney
Party	Candidate	Votes	%	±%
National	Noel Maughan	19,464	63.6	−8.3
Labor	Jason Price	6,041	19.7	−0.9
Independent	Lynett Griffiths	5,091	16.6	+16.6
Total formal votes		30,596	98.4	+0.7
Informal votes		512	1.6	−0.7
Turnout		31,108	95.9	
Two-party-preferred result
National	Noel Maughan	23,266	76.1	+0.1
Labor	Jason Price	7,304	23.9	−0.1
National hold		Swing	+0.1	

1992 Victorian state election: Rodney
Party	Candidate	Votes	%	±%
National	Noel Maughan	21,404	72.0	+5.8
Labor	Jason Price	6,137	20.6	+0.4
Independent	Dennis Lacey	2,202	7.4	+7.4
Total formal votes		29,743	97.7	−0.7
Informal votes		710	2.3	+0.7
Turnout		30,453	96.4	
Two-party-preferred result
National	Noel Maughan	22,612	76.0	−2.3
Labor	Jason Price	7,128	24.0	+2.3
National hold		Swing	−2.3	

=== Elections in the 1980s ===
1989 Rodney state by-election
Party	Candidate	Votes	%	±%
National	Noel Maughan	17,217	66.33	−0.57
Liberal	Donald Oberin	8,741	33.67	+20.19
Total formal votes		25,958	93.46	−4.96
Informal votes		1,847	6.64	+4.96
Turnout		27,805	88.14	−6.43
National hold		Swing	−12.29	

1988 Victorian state election: Rodney
Party	Candidate	Votes	%	±%
National	Eddie Hann	19,330	66.57	−3.87
Labor	Leonard Blair	5,795	19.96	+0.73
Liberal	Margarita Dale	3,913	13.48	+3.15
Total formal votes		29,038	98.32	−0.31
Informal votes		496	1.68	+0.31
Turnout		29,534	94.57	−0.05
Two-party-preferred result
National	Eddie Hann	22,823	78.62	−1.30
Labor	Leonard Blair	6,208	21.38	+1.30
National hold		Swing	−1.30	

1985 Victorian state election: Rodney
Party	Candidate	Votes	%	±%
National	Eddie Hann	19,893	70.4	+8.2
Labor	Denise MacDonald	5,430	19.2	−0.4
Liberal	John Adams	2,917	10.3	−4.3
Total formal votes		28,240	98.6	
Informal votes		393	1.4	
Turnout		28,633	94.6	
Two-party-preferred result
National	Eddie Hann	22,620	80.1	+2.0
Labor	Denise MacDonald	5,620	19.9	−2.0
National hold		Swing	+2.0	

1982 Victorian state election: Rodney
Party	Candidate	Votes	%	±%
National	Eddie Hann	15,525	60.4	+1.8
Labor	Gregory Leeder	5,109	19.9	+3.1
Liberal	Clive Pilley	4,004	15.6	−1.4
Democrats	Douglas Linford	1,087	4.2	−3.4
Total formal votes		25,725	98.5	+0.9
Informal votes		395	1.5	−0.9
Turnout		16,120	95.5	+0.2
Two-party-preferred result
National	Eddie Hann	19,791	76.9	−1.5
Labor	Gregory Leeder	5,934	23.1	+1.5
National hold		Swing	−1.5	

=== Elections in the 1970s ===
1979 Victorian state election: Rodney
Party	Candidate	Votes	%	±%
National	Eddie Hann	14,226	58.6	−5.6
Liberal	Victor Kuhle	4,120	17.0	+0.1
Labor	Stephen Jones	4,089	16.8	+1.8
Democrats	Janet Powell	1,851	7.6	+7.6
Total formal votes		24,286	97.6	−0.8
Informal votes		603	2.4	+0.8
Turnout		24,889	95.3	+0.2
Two-party-preferred result
National	Eddie Hann	19,046	78.4	−4.7
Labor	Stephen Jones	5,240	21.6	+4.7
National hold		Swing	−4.7	

1976 Victorian state election: Rodney
Party	Candidate	Votes	%	±%
National	Eddie Hann	15,196	64.2	+11.7
Liberal	Graham Arthur	4,009	16.9	+0.7
Labor	Michael Smith	3,556	15.0	−6.5
Democratic Labor	David Kane	924	3.9	−6.0
Total formal votes		23,685	98.4	
Informal votes		372	1.6	
Turnout		24,057	95.1	
Two-party-preferred result
National	Eddie Hann	19,680	83.1	+6.9
Labor	Michael Smith	4,005	16.9	−6.9
National hold		Swing	+6.9	

1973 Victorian state election: Rodney
Party	Candidate	Votes	%	±%
Country	Eddie Hann	10,800	55.3	+5.6
Labor	Alan Williams	3,919	20.1	−0.3
Liberal	James Nelms	2,831	14.5	−4.4
Democratic Labor	John Evans	1,995	10.2	−0.9
Total formal votes		19,545	97.8	+0.5
Informal votes		448	2.2	−0.5
Turnout		19,993	94.6	−1.9
Two-party-preferred result
Country	Eddie Hann	15,044	77.0	+0.8
Labor	Alan Williams	4,501	23.0	−0.8
Country hold		Swing	+0.8	

1973 Victorian state election: Rodney
Party	Candidate	Votes	%	±%
Country	Eddie Hann	10,800	55.3	+5.6
Labor	Alan Williams	3,919	20.1	−0.3
Liberal	James Nelms	2,831	14.5	−4.4
Democratic Labor	John Evans	1,995	10.2	−0.9
Total formal votes		19,545	97.8	+0.5
Informal votes		448	2.2	−0.5
Turnout		19,993	94.6	−1.9
Two-party-preferred result
Country	Eddie Hann	15,044	77.0	+0.8
Labor	Alan Williams	4,501	23.0	−0.8
Country hold		Swing	+0.8	

1970 Victorian state election: Rodney
Party	Candidate	Votes	%	±%
Country	Russell McDonald	8,972	49.7	−9.3
Labor	Doris Best	3,677	20.4	+7.8
Liberal	Ian Biggar	3,417	18.9	+3.7
Democratic Labor	Patrick Hansen	2,002	11.1	−2.1
Total formal votes		18,068	97.3	−0.1
Informal votes		494	2.7	+0.1
Turnout		18,562	96.5	−0.4
Two-party-preferred result
Country	Russell McDonald	13,776	76.2	−7.7
Labor	Doris Best	4,292	23.8	+7.7
Country hold		Swing	−7.7	

=== Elections in the 1960s ===
1967 Victorian state election: Rodney
Party	Candidate	Votes	%	±%
Country	Russell McDonald	10,390	59.0	−0.8
Liberal	Peter Gibson	2,673	15.2	−10.1
Democratic Labor	Augustine McCormick	2,330	13.2	−1.7
Labor	David Bornstein	2,228	12.6	+12.6
Total formal votes		17,621	97.4	
Informal votes		461	2.6	
Turnout		18,082	96.9	
Two-party-preferred result
Country	Russell McDonald	14,777	83.9	+21.2
Labor	David Bornstein	2,844	16.1	+16.1
Country hold		Swing	+21.2	

- The two candidate preferred vote was not counted between the Country and Liberal candidates for Rodney.

1964 Victorian state election: Rodney
Party	Candidate	Votes	%	±%
Country	Russell McDonald	12,854	58.8	+13.2
Liberal and Country	John Quinn	5,334	24.4	+2.1
Democratic Labor	Spencer Broom	3,683	16.8	−0.5
Total formal votes		21,871	97.9	+0.3
Informal votes		470	2.1	−0.3
Turnout		22,341	95.7	+0.1
Two-candidate-preferred result
Country	Russell McDonald	13,591	62.1	+6.0
Liberal and Country	John Quinn	8,750	37.9	−6.0
Country hold		Swing	+6.0	

1961 Victorian state election: Rodney
Party	Candidate	Votes	%	±%
Country	Richard Brose	9,569	45.6	−22.9
Liberal and Country	Francis Charlton	4,683	22.3	+22.3
Democratic Labor	Spencer Broom	3,635	17.3	−14.2
Labor	Neil Frankland	3,100	14.7	+14.7
Total formal votes		20,987	97.6	−0.3
Informal votes		432	2.4	+0.3
Turnout		21,419	95.6	−0.2
Two-candidate-preferred result
Country	Richard Brose	11,765	56.1	−12.4
Liberal and Country	Francis Charlton	9,222	43.9	+43.9
Country hold		Swing	N/A	

=== Elections in the 1950s ===
1958 Victorian state election: Rodney
Party	Candidate	Votes	%	±%
Country	Richard Brose	13,832	68.5	
Democratic Labor	Spencer Broom	6,371	31.5	
Total formal votes		20,203	97.9	
Informal votes		442	2.1	
Turnout		20,645	95.8	
Country hold		Swing		

1955 Victorian state election: Rodney
Party	Candidate	Votes	%	±%
Country	Richard Brose	12,157	61.8	
Liberal and Country	Leslie Lord	7,504	38.2	
Total formal votes		19,661	98.1	
Informal votes		380	1.9	
Turnout		20,041	95.0	
Country hold		Swing		

1952 Victorian state election: Rodney
Party	Candidate	Votes	%	±%
Country	Richard Brose	8,827	65.7	+8.4
Liberal and Country	Morton Garner	4,615	34.3	−8.4
Total formal votes		13,442	96.5	−1.6
Informal votes		483	3.5	+1.6
Turnout		13,925	95.0	+0.1
Country hold		Swing	+8.4	

1950 Victorian state election: Rodney
Party	Candidate	Votes	%	±%
Country	Richard Brose	7,796	57.3	−13.5
Liberal and Country	Wollaston Heily	5,801	42.7	+13.5
Total formal votes		13,597	98.1	+2.7
Informal votes		263	1.9	−2.7
Turnout		13,860	94.9	−0.4
Country hold		Swing	−13.5	

=== Elections in the 1940s ===
1947 Victorian state election: Rodney
Party	Candidate	Votes	%	±%
Country	Richard Brose	9,269	70.8	+32.5
Liberal	Morton Garner	3,838	29.2	+29.2
Total formal votes		13,087	95.4	−3.4
Informal votes		628	4.6	+3.4
Turnout		13,087	95.3	+5.3
Country hold		Swing	N/A	

1945 Victorian state election: Rodney
Party	Candidate	Votes	%	±%
Country	Richard Brose	4,803	38.3	
Labor	George White	3,941	31.5	
Country	Wollaston Heily	2,370	18.9	
Independent	Morton Garner	1,416	11.3	
Total formal votes		12,530	98.8	
Informal votes		157	1.2	
Turnout		12,687	90.0	
Two-party-preferred result
Country	Richard Brose	7,867	62.8	
Labor	George White	4,663	37.2	
Country hold		Swing		

1944 Rodney state by-election
Party	Candidate	Votes	%	±%
Independent Country	Richard Brose	4,038	41.0	+41.0
Labor	William Cooper	2,545	25.9	−0.6
Country	James Brady	1,852	18.8	−25.8
Independent	Gordon Anderson	1,402	14.3	+14.3
Total formal votes		9,837	99.0	0.0
Informal votes		99	1.0	0.0
Turnout		9,936	84.1	−3.1
Two-candidate-preferred result
Independent Country	Richard Brose	6,163	62.7	
Labor	William Cooper	3,674	37.3	
Independent Country gain from Country		Swing	N/A	

- Richard Brose joined the Country Party after being elected to parliament.

1943 Victorian state election: Rodney
Party	Candidate	Votes	%	±%
Country	William Dunstone	4,489	44.6	−11.5
Independent	Gordon Anderson	2,918	29.0	+29.0
Labor	Algernon Roberts	2,670	26.5	+26.5
Total formal votes		10,077	99.0	+0.3
Informal votes		102	1.0	−0.3
Turnout		10,179	87.2	−5.7
Two-party-preferred result
Country	William Dunstone	5,209	51.7	−4.4
Independent	Gordon Anderson	4,868	48.3	+48.3
Country hold		Swing	N/A	

1940 Victorian state election: Rodney
Party	Candidate	Votes	%	±%
Country	William Dunstone	6,163	56.1	−43.9
Liberal Country	Archibald McFadyen	4,831	43.9	+43.9
Total formal votes		10,994	98.7	
Informal votes		148	1.3	
Turnout		11,142	92.9	
Country hold		Swing	N/A	

=== Elections in the 1930s ===
1937 Victorian state election: Rodney
Party	Candidate	Votes	%	±%
Country	William Dunstone	unopposed		
Country hold		Swing		

1936 Rodney state by-election
Party	Candidate	Votes	%	±%
Country	William Dunstone	3,647	34.9	+34.9
Country	Samuel Mitchell	3,360	32.2	+32.2
Country	Edward Sullivan	1,436	13.8	−3.1
Country	Thomas Roddis	1,228	11.8	+1.7
Independent	John Davis	769	7.4	+7.4
Total formal votes		10,430	97.6	−1.1
Informal votes		251	2.4	+1.1
Turnout		10,681	89.7	−5.9
Two-candidate-preferred result
Country	William Dunstone	5,579	53.5	
Country	Samuel Mitchell	4,851	46.5	
Country hold		Swing	N/A	

1935 Victorian state election: Rodney
Party	Candidate	Votes	%	±%
Country	John Allan	5,618	49.6	−50.4
Country	Samuel Lancaster	2,642	23.3	+23.3
Country	Edward Sullivan	1,916	16.9	+16.9
Country	Thomas Roddis	1,147	10.1	+10.1
Total formal votes		11,323	98.7	
Informal votes		144	1.3	
Turnout		11,467	95.6	
Country	John Allan	5,825	51.4	N/A
Country	Samuel Lancaster	3,197	28.2	N/A
Country	Edward Sullivan	2,301	20.3	N/A
Country hold		Swing	N/A	

- Preferences were not fully distributed.

1932 Victorian state election: Rodney
Party	Candidate	Votes	%	±%
Country	John Allan	unopposed		
Country hold		Swing		

=== Elections in the 1920s ===
1929 Victorian state election: Rodney
Party	Candidate	Votes	%	±%
Country	John Allan	6,199	58.5	−1.1
Country Progressive	Richard Doidge	4,391	41.5	+4.7
Total formal votes		10,590	99.5	+1.5
Informal votes		51	0.5	−1.5
Turnout		10,641	94.7	+2.6
Country hold		Swing	N/A	

1927 Victorian state election: Rodney
Party	Candidate	Votes	%	±%
Country	John Allan	5,836	59.6	
Country Progressive	Frederick Churches	3,601	36.8	
Australian Liberal	Percy Bryce	360	3.7	
Total formal votes		9,797	98.0	
Informal votes		204	2.0	
Turnout		10,001	92.1	
Country hold		Swing		

- Preferences were not distributed.

1924 Victorian state election: Rodney
Party	Candidate	Votes	%	±%
Country	John Allan	4,125	65.0	+6.9
Country	John Chanter	2,216	35.0	+35.0
Total formal votes		6,341	99.3	+0.2
Informal votes		43	0.7	−0.2
Turnout		6,384	57.0	−9.1
Country hold		Swing	N/A	

1921 Victorian state election: Rodney
Party	Candidate	Votes	%	±%
Victorian Farmers	John Allan	4,338	58.1	−10.3
Nationalist	Hugh McKenzie	3,125	41.9	+10.3
Total formal votes		7,463	99.1	+3.8
Informal votes		71	0.9	−3.8
Turnout		7,534	66.1	+1.6
Victorian Farmers hold		Swing	−10.3	

1920 Victorian state election: Rodney
Party	Candidate	Votes	%	±%
Victorian Farmers	John Allan	4,760	68.4	+30.2
Nationalist	William Thwaites	2,198	31.6	−8.4
Total formal votes		6,958	95.3	−2.4
Informal votes		345	4.7	+2.4
Turnout		7,303	64.5	−4.4
Victorian Farmers hold		Swing	+10.8	

=== Elections in the 1910s ===
1917 Victorian state election: Rodney
Party	Candidate	Votes	%	±%
Nationalist	Hugh McKenzie	2,786	40.0	−10.3
Victorian Farmers	John Allan	2,665	38.2	+38.2
Temperance Movement	William Day	1,520	21.8	+21.8
Total formal votes		6,971	97.7	0.0
Informal votes		166	2.3	0.0
Turnout		7,137	68.9	+0.6
Two-candidate-preferred result
Victorian Farmers	John Allan	4,016	57.6	+57.6
Nationalist	Hugh McKenzie	2,955	42.4	−13.3
Victorian Farmers gain from Nationalist		Swing	N/A	

1914 Victorian state election: Rodney
Party	Candidate	Votes	%	±%
Liberal	Hugh McKenzie	3,575	50.3	−1.9
Labor	Andrew White	3,149	44.3	+44.3
Independent	Richard Abbott	385	5.4	+5.4
Total formal votes		7,109	97.7	−1.2
Informal votes		171	2.3	+1.2
Turnout		7,280	68.3	−5.7
Two-party-preferred result
Liberal	Hugh McKenzie		54.7	+1.7
Labor	Andrew White		45.3	+45.3
Liberal hold		Swing	N/A	

- Two party preferred vote was estimated.

1911 Victorian state election: Rodney
Party	Candidate	Votes	%	±%
Liberal	Hugh McKenzie	3,392	52.2	N/A
Independent	Samuel Lancaster	3,109	47.8	+47.8
Total formal votes		6,501	98.9	
Informal votes		73	1.1	
Turnout		6,574	74.0	
Liberal hold		Swing	N/A	
