= Electoral results for the district of Evelyn =

Victoria, Australia, district election results

This is a list of electoral results for the Electoral district of Evelyn in Victorian state elections.

== Members for Evelyn ==
Member	Party	Term
John Charles King	Unaligned	1859–1859
William Bell	Unaligned	1859–1860
William Jones	Unaligned	1860–1863
John Thompson	Unaligned	1863–1865
William Watkins	Unaligned	1866–1874
Ewen Hugh Cameron	Conservative	1874–1909
Ewen Hugh Cameron	Comm Liberal	1909–1914
James Rouget	Comm Liberal	1914–1917
James Rouget	Nationalist	1917–1917
William Everard	Economy	1917–1918
William Everard	Nationalist	1918–1924
William Everard	Independent	1924–1924
William Everard	United Australia	1924–1945
William Everard	Liberal / LCP	1945–1950
Roland Leckie	LCP	1950–1952
Phillip Connell	Labor	1952–1958
Russell Stokes	LCP / Liberal	1958–1973
Jim Plowman	Liberal	1973–1982
Max McDonald	Labor	1982–1985
Jim Plowman	Liberal	1985–1999
Christine Fyffe	Liberal	1999–2002
Heather McTaggart	Labor	2002–2006
Christine Fyffe	Liberal	2006–2018
Bridget Vallence	Liberal	2018–present

== Election results ==
=== Elections in the 2020s ===
2022 Victorian state election: Evelyn
Party	Candidate	Votes	%	±%
Liberal	Bridget Vallence	20,385	46.7	−1.8
Labor	Lorna Dent	14,277	32.7	−8.0
Greens	Andrew Henley	4,052	9.3	−0.4
Family First	Jeanette Dobson	2,318	5.3	+5.3
Animal Justice	Jan Heald	1,819	4.2	+4.2
Independent	Nat De Francesco	448	1.0	+1.0
Independent	Rosalie De Francesco	366	0.8	+0.8
Total formal votes		43,665	95.1	+0.8
Informal votes		2,254	4.9	−0.8
Turnout		45,919	91.5	
Two-party-preferred result
Liberal	Bridget Vallence	24,114	55.2	+3.4
Labor	Lorna Dent	19,559	44.8	−3.4
Liberal hold		Swing	+3.4	

=== Elections in the 2010s ===
2018 Victorian state election: Evelyn
Party	Candidate	Votes	%	±%
Liberal	Bridget Vallence	18,566	49.49	−4.04
Labor	Gail Ritchie	15,166	40.42	+8.21
Greens	Brodie Everist	3,786	10.09	+3.44
Total formal votes		37,518	94.20	−0.08
Informal votes		2,311	5.80	+0.08
Turnout		39,829	92.28	−2.70
Two-party-preferred result
Liberal	Bridget Vallence	19,753	52.65	−6.94
Labor	Gail Ritchie	17,765	47.35	+6.94
Liberal hold		Swing	−6.94	

2014 Victorian state election: Evelyn
Party	Candidate	Votes	%	±%
Liberal	Christine Fyffe	19,258	53.5	−2.2
Labor	Peter Harris	11,588	32.2	+1.9
Greens	Sandra Betts	2,393	6.7	−0.9
Christians	Damien de Pyle	1,115	3.1	+3.1
Country Alliance	Glenn Williams	905	2.5	−0.3
Independent	Anthony McAleer	447	1.2	+1.2
Independent	Lawrence Mobsby	271	0.8	+0.8
Total formal votes		35,977	94.3	−1.1
Informal votes		2,182	5.7	+1.1
Turnout		38,159	95.0	+2.0
Two-party-preferred result
Liberal	Christine Fyffe	21,476	59.6	−3.0
Labor	Peter Harris	14,562	40.4	+3.0
Liberal hold		Swing	−3.0	

2010 Victorian state election: Evelyn
Party	Candidate	Votes	%	±%
Liberal	Christine Fyffe	20,612	56.77	+10.92
Labor	Peter Harris	10,677	29.41	−8.92
Greens	Tania Giles	2,799	7.71	+0.70
Family First	David Szabo	1,245	3.43	−3.96
Country Alliance	Craig Jenkin	972	2.68	+2.68
Total formal votes		36,305	95.45	−0.18
Informal votes		1,729	4.55	+0.18
Turnout		38,034	94.64	+0.33
Two-party-preferred result
Liberal	Christine Fyffe	23,095	63.48	+10.68
Labor	Peter Harris	13,286	36.52	−10.68
Liberal hold		Swing	+10.68	

=== Elections in the 2000s ===
2006 Victorian state election: Evelyn
Party	Candidate	Votes	%	±%
Liberal	Christine Fyffe	15,586	45.85	−0.26
Labor	Heather McTaggart	13,032	38.33	−3.77
Family First	Roger Williamson	2,513	7.39	+7.39
Greens	Justine Indigo-Rose	2,382	7.01	−1.39
People Power	Peter Byrne	483	1.42	+1.42
Total formal votes		33,996	95.63	−0.92
Informal votes		1,553	4.37	+0.92
Turnout		35,549	94.31	+0.84
Two-party-preferred result
Liberal	Christine Fyffe	17,970	52.80	+3.13
Labor	Heather McTaggart	16,061	47.20	−3.13
Liberal gain from Labor		Swing	+3.13	

2002 Victorian state election: Evelyn
Party	Candidate	Votes	%	±%
Liberal	Christine Fyffe	15,386	46.1	−13.0
Labor	Heather McTaggart	14,048	42.1	+8.7
Greens	Rob Hay	2,803	8.4	+8.4
Independent	Gabriela Byrne	1,129	3.4	+3.4
Total formal votes		33,366	96.6	−0.5
Informal votes		1,192	3.4	+0.5
Turnout		34,558	93.5	
Two-party-preferred result
Labor	Heather McTaggart	16,793	50.3	+12.6
Liberal	Christine Fyffe	16,573	49.7	−12.6
Labor gain from Liberal		Swing	+12.6	

=== Elections in the 1990s ===
1999 Victorian state election: Evelyn
Party	Candidate	Votes	%	±%
Liberal	Christine Fyffe	18,367	54.8	−5.1
Labor	Natasha Marquez-Bridger	11,480	34.2	+0.8
Independent	Rick Houlihan	1,862	5.6	+5.6
Independent	Colin Gillam	1,824	5.4	+5.4
Total formal votes		33,533	97.0	−0.6
Informal votes		1,042	3.0	+0.6
Turnout		34,575	94.1	
Two-party-preferred result
Liberal	Christine Fyffe	19,957	59.5	−3.2
Labor	Natasha Marquez-Bridger	13,571	40.5	+3.2
Liberal hold		Swing	−3.2	

1996 Victorian state election: Evelyn
Party	Candidate	Votes	%	±%
Liberal	Jim Plowman	19,044	59.9	+1.6
Labor	Di Moore	10,638	33.4	+3.4
Independent	Bruce Aumann	1,702	5.4	+5.4
Natural Law	Frank Youakim	425	1.3	+1.3
Total formal votes		31,809	97.5	+0.8
Informal votes		802	2.5	−0.8
Turnout		32,611	94.1	
Two-party-preferred result
Liberal	Jim Plowman	19,914	62.7	−2.5
Labor	Di Moore	11,842	37.3	+2.5
Liberal hold		Swing	−2.5	

1992 Victorian state election: Evelyn
Party	Candidate	Votes	%	±%
Liberal	Jim Plowman	17,445	58.3	+6.6
Labor	Lydia MacMichael	9,003	30.1	−14.3
Independent	Rick Houlihan	3,473	11.6	+11.6
Total formal votes		29,921	96.7	−0.5
Informal votes		1,016	3.3	+0.5
Turnout		30,937	95.6	
Two-party-preferred result
Liberal	Jim Plowman	19,485	65.2	+12.0
Labor	Lydia MacMichael	10,382	34.8	−12.0
Liberal hold		Swing	+12.0	

=== Elections in the 1980s ===
1988 Victorian state election: Evelyn
Party	Candidate	Votes	%	±%
Liberal	Jim Plowman	16,393	52.78	+2.88
Labor	Geoff Cooper	13,690	44.07	−1.15
Independent	Earle Keegel	978	3.15	+3.15
Total formal votes		31,061	97.30	−0.59
Informal votes		863	2.70	+0.59
Turnout		31,924	93.51	−0.24
Two-party-preferred result
Liberal	Jim Plowman	16,774	54.00	+1.17
Labor	Geoffrey Cooper	14,287	46.00	−1.17
Liberal hold		Swing	+1.17	

1985 Victorian state election: Evelyn
Party	Candidate	Votes	%	±%
Liberal	Jim Plowman	13,899	49.9	+6.6
Labor	Graham Ihlein	12,594	45.2	+0.3
Independent	Gaye Gelly	1,360	4.9	+4.9
Total formal votes		27,853	97.9	
Informal votes		601	2.1	
Turnout		28,454	93.8	
Two-party-preferred result
Liberal	Jim Plowman	13,899	52.8	+4.1
Labor	Graham Ihlein	13,137	47.2	−4.1
Liberal gain from Labor		Swing	+4.1	

1982 Victorian state election: Evelyn
Party	Candidate	Votes	%	±%
Labor	Max McDonald	16,858	49.0	+6.6
Liberal	Jim Plowman	14,224	41.4	−6.0
Democrats	Bruce McFarlane	2,264	6.6	−3.7
Independent	Peter Gompertz	1,042	3.0	+3.0
Total formal votes		34,388	98.0	+0.6
Informal votes		710	2.0	−0.6
Turnout		35,098	93.3	+0.5
Two-party-preferred result
Labor	Max McDonald	16,858	54.3	+8.1
Liberal	Jim Plowman	15,732	45.7	−8.1
Labor gain from Liberal		Swing	+8.1	

=== Elections in the 1970s ===
1979 Victorian state election: Evelyn
Party	Candidate	Votes	%	±%
Liberal	Jim Plowman	14,076	47.4	−4.6
Labor	William Thomas	12,591	42.4	+2.9
Democrats	John Couzens	3,044	10.3	+10.3
Total formal votes		29,711	97.4	−0.6
Informal votes		794	2.6	+0.6
Turnout		30,505	92.8	+1.2
Two-party-preferred result
Liberal	Jim Plowman	15,995	53.8	−5.8
Labor	William Thomas	13,716	46.2	+5.8
Liberal hold		Swing	−5.8	

1976 Victorian state election: Evelyn
Party	Candidate	Votes	%	±%
Liberal	Jim Plowman	13,081	52.0	+1.3
Labor	Warren Thomas	9,934	39.5	−2.1
Democratic Labor	Francis Feltham	1,115	4.4	−0.4
National	Errol Simon	1,103	4.0	+3.7
Total formal votes		25,143	98.0	
Informal votes		519	2.0	
Turnout		25,662	91.6	
Two-party-preferred result
Liberal	Jim Plowman	14,997	59.6	+3.1
Labor	Warren Thomas	10,146	40.4	−3.1
Liberal hold		Swing	+3.1	

1973 Victorian state election: Evelyn
Party	Candidate	Votes	%	±%
Liberal	Jim Plowman	11,762	50.1	+5.5
Labor	Raymond Donkin	9,651	41.1	−2.0
Democratic Labor	Francis Feltham	1,330	5.7	−2.7
Australia	Dennis Lacey	718	3.1	+3.1
Total formal votes		23,461	97.6	+0.2
Informal votes		568	2.4	−0.2
Turnout		24,029	92.9	−1.7
Two-party-preferred result
Liberal	Jim Plowman	13,251	56.5	+2.6
Labor	Raymond Donkin	10,210	43.5	−2.6
Liberal hold		Swing	+2.6	

1970 Victorian state election: Evelyn
Party	Candidate	Votes	%	±%
Liberal	Russell Stokes	8,711	44.6	+2.9
Labor	Raymond Donkin	8,414	43.1	+9.4
Democratic Labor	Alfred Gerrard	1,643	8.4	−0.7
Independent	Maurice Smith	766	3.9	+3.9
Total formal votes		19,534	97.4	+0.7
Informal votes		528	2.6	−0.7
Turnout		20,062	94.6	+0.7
Two-party-preferred result
Liberal	Russell Stokes	10,526	53.9	−6.9
Labor	Raymond Donkin	9,008	46.1	+6.9
Liberal hold		Swing	−6.9	

=== Elections in the 1960s ===
1967 Victorian state election: Evelyn
Party	Candidate	Votes	%	±%
Liberal	Russell Stokes	7,457	41.7	−2.5
Labor	Arnold Hubbard	6,022	33.7	+3.1
Country	William Nankervis	2,352	13.1	+0.9
Democratic Labor	Audrey Walsh	1,633	9.1	−4.0
Independent	Henry Folan	433	2.4	+2.4
Total formal votes		17,897	96.7	
Informal votes		615	3.3	
Turnout		18,512	93.7	
Two-party-preferred result
Liberal	Russell Stokes	10,882	60.8	−4.2
Labor	Arnold Hubbard	7,015	39.2	+4.2
Liberal hold		Swing	−4.2	

1964 Victorian state election: Evelyn
Party	Candidate	Votes	%	±%
Liberal and Country	Russell Stokes	14,923	45.5	+2.2
Labor	Donald King	12,987	39.6	−0.6
Democratic Labor	Kevin Gould	4,851	14.8	−1.7
Total formal votes		32,761	98.4	+0.2
Informal votes		536	1.6	−0.2
Turnout		33,297	94.5	+0.6
Two-party-preferred result
Liberal and Country	Russell Stokes	18,574	56.7	+1.7
Labor	Donald King	14,187	43.3	−1.7
Liberal and Country hold		Swing	+1.7	

1961 Victorian state election: Evelyn
Party	Candidate	Votes	%	±%
Liberal and Country	Russell Stokes	12,302	43.3	−0.5
Labor	Donald King	11,424	40.2	−3.3
Democratic Labor	Kevin Gould	4,704	16.5	+3.7
Total formal votes		28,430	98.2	−0.3
Informal votes		516	1.8	+0.3
Turnout		28,946	93.9	−0.5
Two-party-preferred result
Liberal and Country	Russell Stokes	15,647	55.0	+0.9
Labor	Donald King	12,783	45.0	−0.9
Liberal and Country hold		Swing	+0.9	

=== Elections in the 1950s ===
1958 Victorian state election: Evelyn
Party	Candidate	Votes	%	±%
Liberal and Country	Russell Stokes	10,376	43.7	
Labor	Phillip Connell	10,304	43.5	
Democratic Labor	Kevin Gould	3,035	12.8	
Total formal votes		23,715	98.5	
Informal votes		371	1.5	
Turnout		24,086	94.4	
Two-party-preferred result
Liberal and Country	Russell Stokes	12,817	54.1	
Labor	Phillip Connell	10,898	45.9	
Liberal and Country gain from Labor		Swing		

1955 Victorian state election: Evelyn
Party	Candidate	Votes	%	±%
Labor	Phillip Connell	11,519	38.9	
Liberal and Country	Arthur Ireland	11,070	37.3	
Labor (A-C)	Michael Lucy	7,048	23.8	
Total formal votes		29,637	98.2	
Informal votes		544	1.8	
Turnout		30,181	94.2	
Two-party-preferred result
Labor	Phillip Connell	16,212	54.7	
Liberal and Country	Arthur Ireland	13,425	45.3	
Labor hold		Swing		

1952 Victorian state election: Evelyn
Party	Candidate	Votes	%	±%
Labor	Phillip Connell	8,465	48.8	+14.4
Liberal and Country	Roland Leckie	6,589	38.0	−15.8
Electoral Reform	Lindsay Gown	1,477	8.5	+8.5
Independent	Lyndhurst Mullett	822	4.7	+4.7
Total formal votes		17,353	98.3	−0.5
Informal votes		304	1.7	+0.5
Turnout		17,657	92.8	−0.5
Two-party-preferred result
Labor	Phillip Connell	9,044	52.1	+7.1
Liberal	Roland Leckie	8,309	47.9	−7.1
Labor gain from Liberal and Country		Swing	+7.1	

1950 Victorian state election: Evelyn
Party	Candidate	Votes	%	±%
Liberal and Country	Roland Leckie	8,466	53.8	−7.1
Labor	John Dunbar	5,413	34.4	−1.3
Independent	Clifford Wolfe	1,863	11.8	+11.8
Total formal votes		15,742	98.8	+0.3
Informal votes		187	1.2	−0.3
Turnout		15,929	93.3	0.0
Two-party-preferred result
Liberal and Country	Roland Leckie	8,653	55.0	−8.9
Labor	John Dunbar	7,089	45.0	+8.9
Liberal and Country hold		Swing	−8.9	

=== Elections in the 1940s ===
1947 Victorian state election: Evelyn
Party	Candidate	Votes	%	±%
Liberal	William Everard	8,656	60.9	+31.5
Labor	Roderick Leeson	5,074	35.7	−3.6
Independent Country	Patrick McKie	474	3.3	+3.3
Total formal votes		14,204	98.5	0.0
Informal votes		213	1.5	0.0
Turnout		14,417	93.3	+5.7
Liberal hold		Swing	N/A	

- Preferences were not distributed.

1945 Victorian state election: Evelyn
Party	Candidate	Votes	%	±%
Labor	Clifford Wolfe	4,610	39.3	
Ministerial Liberal	William Everard	3,668	31.3	
Liberal	Frank Le Leu	3,445	29.4	
Total formal votes		11,723	98.5	
Informal votes		175	1.5	
Turnout		11,898	87.6	
Two-party-preferred result
Ministerial Liberal	William Everard	6,693	57.1	
Labor	Clifford Wolfe	5,030	42.9	
Ministerial Liberal gain from Liberal		Swing		

1943 Victorian state election: Evelyn
Party	Candidate	Votes	%	±%
United Australia	William Everard	6,942	62.4	−37.6
Labor	Jack Gill	4,183	37.6	+37.6
Total formal votes		11,125	98.3	
Informal votes		189	1.7	
Turnout		11,314	85.3	
United Australia hold		Swing	N/A	

1940 Victorian state election: Evelyn
Party	Candidate	Votes	%	±%
United Australia	William Everard	unopposed		
United Australia hold		Swing		

=== Elections in the 1930s ===
1937 Victorian state election: Evelyn
Party	Candidate	Votes	%	±%
United Australia	William Everard	6,315	58.5	−4.2
Independent	John Jessop	2,613	24.2	+24.2
Country	Thomas Mitchell	1,862	17.3	+17.3
Total formal votes		10,790	98.9	+0.4
Informal votes		119	1.1	−0.4
Turnout		10,909	93.5	+0.3
United Australia hold		Swing	N/A	

- Preferences were not distributed.

1935 Victorian state election: Evelyn
Party	Candidate	Votes	%	±%
United Australia	William Everard	6,531	62.7	+3.3
Independent	George Mott	2,378	22.8	+22.8
Independent	John Wood	1,513	14.5	+14.5
Total formal votes		10,422	98.5	+0.2
Informal votes		157	1.5	−0.2
Turnout		10,579	93.2	+0.9
United Australia hold		Swing	N/A	

- Preferences were not distributed.

1932 Victorian state election: Evelyn
Party	Candidate	Votes	%	±%
United Australia	William Everard	5,771	59.4	−1.5
Independent	Maurice Fergusson	3,944	40.6	+40.6
Total formal votes		9,715	98.3	−1.0
Informal votes		166	1.7	+1.0
Turnout		9,881	92.3	−0.7
United Australia hold		Swing	N/A	

=== Elections in the 1920s ===
1929 Victorian state election: Evelyn
Party	Candidate	Votes	%	±%
Nationalist	William Everard	5,622	60.9	+60.9
Labor	Edward Hodges	3,607	39.1	+10.3
Total formal votes		9,229	99.3	+1.9
Informal votes		65	0.7	−1.9
Turnout		9,294	93.0	+2.6
Nationalist gain from Ind. Nationalist		Swing	N/A	

1927 Victorian state election: Evelyn
Party	Candidate	Votes	%	±%
Ind. Nationalist	William Everard	4,468	53.4	
Labor	Edward Hodges	2,404	28.8	
Australian Liberal	Joseph Smith	1,487	17.8	
Total formal votes		8,359	97.4	
Informal votes		228	2.6	
Turnout		8,587	90.4	
Ind. Nationalist gain from Australian Liberal		Swing		

1924 Victorian state election: Evelyn
Party	Candidate	Votes	%	±%
Australian Liberal	William Everard	4,553	77.6	+77.6
Nationalist	Herbert Hewitt	1,317	22.4	−58.6
Total formal votes		5,870	99.4	0.0
Informal votes		34	0.6	0.0
Turnout		5,904	48.3	+1.0
Australian Liberal gain from Nationalist		Swing	N/A	

- William Everard was the sitting Nationalist MP for Evelyn.

1921 Victorian state election: Evelyn
Party	Candidate	Votes	%	±%
Nationalist	William Everard	4,624	81.0	+31.9
Labor	Arthur Jones	1,085	19.0	+3.9
Total formal votes		5,709	99.4	+6.1
Informal votes		37	0.6	−6.1
Turnout		5,746	47.3	−18.0
Nationalist hold		Swing	N/A	

1920 Victorian state election: Evelyn
Party	Candidate	Votes	%	±%
Nationalist	William Everard	3,575	49.1	+6.1
Nationalist	William Williams	1,516	20.8	+20.8
Labor	Arthur Jones	1,098	15.1	+15.1
Nationalist	James Rouget	1,096	15.0	−29.1
Total formal votes		7,285	93.3	−4.2
Informal votes		520	6.7	+4.2
Turnout		7,805	65.3	+19.7
After distribution of preferences
Nationalist	William Everard	3,805	52.2	
Nationalist	William Williams	2,303	31.6	
Labor	Arthur Jones	1,177	16.2	
Nationalist hold		Swing	N/A	

=== Elections in the 1910s ===
1917 Victorian state election: Evelyn
Party	Candidate	Votes	%	±%
Nationalist	James Rouget	2,102	44.1	+14.8
Nationalist	William Everard	2,047	43.0	+27.8
Nationalist	Reginald Kelly	616	12.9	+12.9
Total formal votes		4,765	97.5	+1.3
Informal votes		122	2.5	−1.3
Turnout		4,887	45.6	−7.1
Two-candidate-preferred result
Nationalist	William Everard	2,398	50.3	
Nationalist	James Rouget	2,367	49.7	
Nationalist hold		Swing	N/A	

1914 Victorian state election: Evelyn
Party	Candidate	Votes	%	±%
Liberal	James Rouget	1,546	29.3	+10.6
Labor	Edward Duncan	1,285	24.4	+10.7
Liberal	George Maxwell	935	17.7	+17.7
Liberal	William Everard	804	15.2	+15.2
Liberal	William Sell	370	7.0	−2.5
Liberal	Edward Skardon	331	6.3	+6.3
Total formal votes		5,271	96.2	−2.4
Informal votes		210	3.8	+2.4
Turnout		5,481	52.7	−4.1
Two-party-preferred result
Liberal	James Rouget	3,436	65.2	+0.5
Labor	Edward Duncan	1,835	34.8	−0.5
Liberal hold		Swing	+0.5	

1911 Victorian state election: Evelyn
Party	Candidate	Votes	%	±%
Liberal	Ewen Cameron	2,831	58.1	−1.9
Independent	James Rouget	909	18.7	−21.3
Labor	James Mirams	666	13.7	+13.7
Independent	William Sell	462	9.5	+9.5
Total formal votes		4,868	98.6	−0.9
Informal votes		71	1.4	+0.9
Turnout		4,939	56.8	+20.1
Liberal hold		Swing	N/A	

- Preferences were not distributed.
