= 1989 Rodney state by-election =

A by-election was held for the Victorian Legislative Assembly seat of Rodney on 4 March 1989. The by-election was triggered by the resignation on 25 January of sitting National Party MP Eddie Hann.

== Results ==
Rodney state by-election, 1989
Party	Candidate	Votes	%	±%
National	Noel Maughan	17,217	66.33	−0.57
Liberal	Donald Oberin	8,741	33.67	+20.19
Total formal votes		25,958	93.46	−4.96
Informal votes		1,847	6.64	+4.96
Turnout		27,805	88.14	−6.43
National hold		Swing	−12.29	
