= Electoral results for the district of Whittlesea =

Australian district election results

This is a list of electoral results for the electoral district of Whittlesea in Victorian state elections.

== Members for Whittlesea ==
Member	Party	Term
Max McDonald	Labor	1985–1992

== Election results ==
=== Elections in the 1980s ===
1988 Victorian state election: Whittlesea
Party	Candidate	Votes	%	±%
Labor	Max McDonald	18,279	54.70	+0.09
Liberal	Geoffrey Parsons	15,139	45.30	−0.09
Total formal votes		33,418	96.57	−1.14
Informal votes		1,186	3.43	+1.14
Turnout		34,604	93.84	−0.54
Labor hold		Swing	+0.09	

1985 Victorian state election: Whittlesea
Party	Candidate	Votes	%	±%
Labor	Max McDonald	15,209	54.6	+3.6
Liberal	Haydn Gregson	12,640	45.4	+2.8
Total formal votes		27,849	97.7	
Informal votes		652	2.3	
Turnout		28,501	94.4	
Labor hold		Swing	−1.1	
