= Vallence =

Vallence is a surname. Notable people with the surname include:

- Bridget Vallence, Australian politician
- Harry Vallence (1905–1991), Australian rules footballer
