= Electoral results for the district of Collingwood =

Victoria, Australia, district election results

This is a list of electoral results for the electoral district of Collingwood in Victorian state elections.

== Members for Collingwood ==
The district initially had two members, which was increased to three from 1859, reverted to two after 1877, and was represented by only one member from 1904.

| Member 1 | Term | Member 2 | Term | | |
|---|---|---|---|---|---|
| Thomas Embling | Nov 1856 – July 1861 | George Harker | Nov 1856 – Aug 1859 | Member 3 | Term |
| Thomas Embling | Nov 1856 – July 1861 | George Milner Stephen | Oct 1859 – July 1861 | Charles Jardine Don | Oct 1859 – Aug 1864 |
| Graham Berry | Aug 1861 – Dec 1865 | John Edwards | Aug 1861 – Dec 1867 | George Harker | Nov 1864 – Dec 1865 |
| Thomas Embling | Feb 1866 – Dec 1867 | John Edwards | Aug 1861 – Dec 1867 | Isaac Reeves | Feb 1866 – Oct 1869 |
| John Everard | Mar 1868 – Feb 1871 | William Bates | Mar 1868 – Mar 1874 | Isaac Reeves | Feb 1866 – Oct 1869 |
| George Harker | Apr 1871 – Mar 1874 | William Bates | Mar 1868 – Mar 1874 | William Vale | Oct 1869^{[b]} – Mar 1874 |
| John Everard | May 1874 – July 1874 | James Forester Sullivan | May 1874 – Feb 1876 | Albert Lee Tucker | May 1874 – Apr 1877 |
| George David Langridge | Aug 1874^{[b]} – Mar 1891 | | | | |
| George David Langridge | Aug 1874^{[b]} – Mar 1891 | James Mirams | Feb 1876 – Feb 1886 | | |
| George David Langridge | Aug 1874^{[b]} – Mar 1891 | William Guard Feild | Mar 1886 – Mar 1889 | | |
| John Hancock | Jun 1891^{[b]} – Apr 1892 | William Beazley | Apr 1889 – May 1904 | | |
| Edgar Wilkins | May 1892 – Dec 1908 | William Beazley | Apr 1889 – May 1904 | | |

Single Member District
| Member | Party | Term |
|---|---|---|
| Martin Hannah | Labor | 1904 – 1920 |
| Martin Hannah | Independent | 1920 – 1921 |
| Tom Tunnecliffe | Labor | 1921 – 1947 |
| Bill Towers | Labor | 1947^{[b]} – 1958 |

^{[b]} = by-election

== Election results ==
=== Elections in the 1950s ===
1955 Victorian state election: Collingwood
| Party | Candidate | Votes | % | ±% |
|---|---|---|---|---|
| Labor | Bill Towers | 8,906 | 63.4 | |
| Labor (A-C) | William Livy | 3,399 | 24.2 | |
| Liberal and Country | Martha Yuille | 1,746 | 12.4 | |
| Total formal votes | | 14,051 | 97.8 | |
| Informal votes | | 318 | 2.2 | |
| Turnout | | 14,369 | 93.6 | |
Two-candidate-preferred result
| Labor | Bill Towers | 9,343 | 66.5 | |
| Labor (A-C) | William Livy | 4,708 | 33.5 | |
| Labor hold | | Swing | | |

1952 Victorian state election: Collingwood
| Party | Candidate | Votes | % | ±% |
|---|---|---|---|---|
| Labor | Bill Towers | unopposed | | |
| Labor hold | | Swing | | |

1950 Victorian state election: Collingwood
| Party | Candidate | Votes | % | ±% |
|---|---|---|---|---|
| Labor | Bill Towers | 18,026 | 78.6 | +5.2 |
| Liberal and Country | Richard Taylor | 4,918 | 21.4 | −5.2 |
| Total formal votes | | 22,944 | 98.2 | +0.8 |
| Informal votes | | 430 | 1.8 | −0.8 |
| Turnout | | 23,374 | 91.1 | −0.4 |
| Labor hold | | Swing | +5.2 | |

=== Elections in the 1940s ===
1947 Victorian state election: Collingwood
| Party | Candidate | Votes | % | ±% |
|---|---|---|---|---|
| Labor | Bill Towers | 17,690 | 73.4 | −26.6 |
| Liberal | William Boughton | 6,420 | 26.6 | +26.6 |
| Total formal votes | | 24,110 | 97.4 | |
| Informal votes | | 653 | 2.6 | |
| Turnout | | 24,763 | 91.5 | |
| Labor hold | | Swing | N/A | |

1947 Collingwood state by-election
| Party | Candidate | Votes | % | ±% |
|---|---|---|---|---|
| Labor | Bill Towers | 13,273 | 65.7 | |
| Liberal | William Boughton | 4,067 | 20.1 | |
| Independent | James Baker | 1,615 | 8.0 | |
| Communist | Leslie Loye | 1,256 | 6.2 | |
| Total formal votes | | 20,211 | 96.6 | |
| Informal votes | | 713 | 3.4 | |
| Turnout | | 20,924 | 79.4 | |
| Labor hold | | Swing | N/A | |

- Preferences were not distributed.

1945 Victorian state election: Collingwood
| Party | Candidate | Votes | % | ±% |
|---|---|---|---|---|
| Labor | Tom Tunnecliffe | unopposed | | |
| Labor hold | | Swing | | |

1943 Victorian state election: Collingwood
| Party | Candidate | Votes | % | ±% |
|---|---|---|---|---|
| Labor | Tom Tunnecliffe | 9,032 | 46.1 | −2.2 |
| Independent Labor | James Baker | 4,838 | 24.7 | −10.3 |
| Communist | Ralph Gibson | 4,016 | 20.5 | +13.6 |
| Independent | William King | 1,694 | 8.6 | +8.6 |
| Total formal votes | | 19,580 | 93.7 | −2.0 |
| Informal votes | | 1,323 | 6.3 | +2.0 |
| Turnout | | 20,903 | 85.3 | −5.7 |
Two-candidate-preferred result
| Labor | Tom Tunnecliffe | 12,279 | 62.7 | |
| Independent Labor | James Baker | 7,301 | 37.3 | |
| Labor hold | | Swing | N/A | |

1940 Victorian state election: Collingwood
| Party | Candidate | Votes | % | ±% |
|---|---|---|---|---|
| Labor | Tom Tunnecliffe | 9,694 | 48.3 | −33.2 |
| Independent Labor | James Baker | 7,023 | 35.0 | +35.0 |
| United Australia | Frederick Dods | 1,950 | 9.7 | −8.8 |
| Communist | John Blake | 1,388 | 6.9 | +6.9 |
| Total formal votes | | 20,055 | 95.7 | −2.5 |
| Informal votes | | 893 | 4.3 | +2.5 |
| Turnout | | 20,948 | 91.0 | −1.6 |
Two-candidate-preferred result
| Labor | Tom Tunnecliffe | | 52.1 | |
| Independent | James Baker | | 47.9 | |
| Labor hold | | Swing | N/A | |

- Two candidate preferred vote was estimated.

=== Elections in the 1930s ===
1937 Victorian state election: Collingwood
| Party | Candidate | Votes | % | ±% |
|---|---|---|---|---|
| Labor | Tom Tunnecliffe | 17,286 | 81.5 | +15.3 |
| United Australia | Oliver Dixon | 3,915 | 18.5 | −3.4 |
| Total formal votes | | 21,201 | 98.2 | +1.0 |
| Informal votes | | 392 | 1.8 | −1.0 |
| Turnout | | 21,593 | 92.6 | +0.6 |
| Labor hold | | Swing | +4.5 | |

1935 Victorian state election: Collingwood
| Party | Candidate | Votes | % | ±% |
|---|---|---|---|---|
| Labor | Tom Tunnecliffe | 13,806 | 66.2 | −33.8 |
| United Australia | Robert Breen | 4,562 | 21.9 | +21.9 |
| Communist | Ernie Thornton | 2,501 | 12.0 | +12.0 |
| Total formal votes | | 20,869 | 97.2 | |
| Informal votes | | 602 | 2.8 | |
| Turnout | | 21,471 | 92.0 | |
Two-party-preferred result
| Labor | Tom Tunnecliffe | | 77.0 | −23.0 |
| United Australia | Robert Breen | | 23.0 | +23.0 |
| Labor hold | | Swing | N/A | |

- Two party preferred vote was estimated.

1932 Victorian state election: Collingwood
| Party | Candidate | Votes | % | ±% |
|---|---|---|---|---|
| Labor | Tom Tunnecliffe | unopposed | | |
| Labor hold | | Swing | | |

=== Elections in the 1920s ===
1929 Victorian state election: Collingwood
| Party | Candidate | Votes | % | ±% |
|---|---|---|---|---|
| Labor | Tom Tunnecliffe | unopposed | | |
| Labor hold | | Swing | | |

1927 Victorian state election: Collingwood
| Party | Candidate | Votes | % | ±% |
|---|---|---|---|---|
| Labor | Tom Tunnecliffe | 16,392 | 77.2 | |
| Nationalist | Ralph Stredwick | 4,843 | 22.8 | |
| Total formal votes | | 21,235 | 98.2 | |
| Informal votes | | 391 | 1.8 | |
| Turnout | | 21,626 | 90.6 | |
| Labor hold | | Swing | | |

1924 Victorian state election: Collingwood
| Party | Candidate | Votes | % | ±% |
|---|---|---|---|---|
| Labor | Tom Tunnecliffe | unopposed | | |
| Labor hold | | Swing | | |

1921 Victorian state election: Collingwood
| Party | Candidate | Votes | % | ±% |
|---|---|---|---|---|
| Labor | Tom Tunnecliffe | 5,313 | 56.4 | +8.8 |
| Independent Labor | Martin Hannah | 2,437 | 25.9 | −2.2 |
| Nationalist | Alexander Young | 876 | 9.3 | −15.0 |
| Independent | James Reid | 786 | 8.3 | +8.3 |
| Total formal votes | | 9,412 | 98.1 | +4.8 |
| Informal votes | | 183 | 1.9 | −4.8 |
| Turnout | | 9,595 | 64.9 | −4.3 |
Two-candidate-preferred result
| Labor | Tom Tunnecliffe | | 58.2 | +8.7 |
| Independent Labor | Martin Hannah | | 41.8 | −8.7 |
| Labor gain from Independent Labor | | Swing | +8.7 | |

- Two candidate preferred vote was estimated.

1920 Victorian state election: Collingwood
| Party | Candidate | Votes | % | ±% |
|---|---|---|---|---|
| Labor | Thomas McAllen | 4,732 | 47.6 | |
| Independent Labor | Martin Hannah | 2,793 | 28.1 | |
| Nationalist | Harry Evans | 2,417 | 24.3 | |
| Total formal votes | | 9,942 | 93.3 | |
| Informal votes | | 714 | 6.7 | |
| Turnout | | 10,656 | 69.2 | |
Two-candidate-preferred result
| Independent Labor | Martin Hannah | 5,017 | 50.5 | |
| Labor | Thomas McAllen | 4,925 | 49.5 | |
| Independent Labor gain from Labor | | Swing | N/A | |

=== Elections in the 1910s ===
1917 Victorian state election: Collingwood
| Party | Candidate | Votes | % | ±% |
|---|---|---|---|---|
| Labor | Martin Hannah | unopposed | | |
| Labor hold | | Swing | | |

1914 Victorian state election: Collingwood
| Party | Candidate | Votes | % | ±% |
|---|---|---|---|---|
| Labor | Martin Hannah | unopposed | | |
| Labor hold | | Swing | | |

1911 Victorian state election: Collingwood
| Party | Candidate | Votes | % | ±% |
|---|---|---|---|---|
| Labor | Martin Hannah | 5,227 | 66.5 | +25.3 |
| Liberal | Stanley Lewis | 2,632 | 33.5 | +10.4 |
| Total formal votes | | 7,859 | 98.5 | −1.1 |
| Informal votes | | 120 | 1.5 | +1.1 |
| Turnout | | 7,979 | 59.6 | −5.7 |
| Labor hold | | Swing | N/A | |

=== Elections in the 1900s ===
1908 Victorian state election: Collingwood
| Party | Candidate | Votes | % | ±% |
|---|---|---|---|---|
| Labor | Martin Hannah | 984 | 40.2 | +40.2 |
| Independent Ministerial | Edgar Wilkins | 816 | 33.1 | –23.7 |
| Liberal | Harry Evans | 565 | 23.1 | +23.1 |
| Victorian Socialist | Percy Laidler | 85 | 3.5 | +3.5 |
| Total formal votes | | 2,923 | 99.6 | |
| Informal votes | | 13 | 0.4 | |
| Turnout | | 2,936 | 65.3 | |
| Labor gain from Independent Ministerial | | Swing | +40.2 | |
