= William Webb (Victorian politician) =

Australian politician

The Honourable William Telford Webb
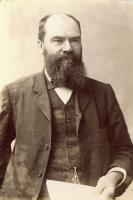
- Portrait of William Telford Webb

Commissioner of Public Works
- In office 23 January 1893 – 27 September 1894
- Premier: James Patterson
- Preceded by: George Graham MP
- Succeeded by: John Taverner MP

Minister of Agriculture
- In office 23 January 1893 – 27 September 1894
- Premier: James Patterson
- Preceded by: George Graham MP
- Succeeded by: John Taverner MP

Vice-President of the Board of Land and Works
- In office 23 January 1893 – 27 September 1894 Serving with Richard Baker
- Premier: James Patterson

Member of the Victorian Legislative Assembly for Mandurang
- In office 1 December 1903 – 1 May 1904
- Preceded by: Max Hirsch
- Succeeded by: Seat Abolished

Member of the Victorian Legislative Assembly for Rodney
- In office 1 April 1889 – 1 September 1897 Serving with James Shackell, Timothy Murphy, and Andrew White
- Preceded by: Simon Fraser and Timothy Murphy
- Succeeded by: John Mason and Duncan Gillies

Personal details
- Born: 28 July 1842 Tullamore, County Offaly, Ireland
- Died: 17 January 1911 (aged 68) St Kilda, Victoria
- Resting place: Rochester Cemetery, Rochester, Victoria
- Spouse(s): Elizabeth Alice Everitt, m. 24 October 1883, St Matthew's Church, Prahran
- Parents: Richard Webb (father); Maria, née Telford (mother)
- Occupation: Farmer; Irrigationist; Local government councillor; Local government head

William Telford Webb (1842–1911) was an Australian farmer and politician. Born in Tullamore, Ireland, he arrived to Melbourne, Australia on 28 January 1859 on the Black Eagle. In 1863, he went to the Dunstan goldfields in New Zealand but returned to Australia shortly after due an extreme snowstorm that affected the area.

== Career and politics ==
He first entered politics when he was elected as the farming representative in the Shire of Rochester from 1873 to 1892. He also served as the shire's president from 1877 to 1879. He ran as a candidate in the 1883 election for Electoral district of Rodney in the Legislative Assembly but was unsuccessful. He sought election again in the 1889 election and went on to become the member for Rodney alongside James Shackell, Timothy Murphy, and Andrew White. He held the seat up until 1 September 1897 and during that time, served as the Commissioner of Public Works, Minister of Agriculture, and Vice-President of the Board of Land and Works.

In 1889, Webb became an agent and grain-buyer for farmers, he ran a milling and butchering business, and started a yeomanry store on Mackie Street, Rochester. He also held a large share in Fresh Food and Frozen Storage Co. Ltd which ran creameries, butter factories and cool rooms throughout Victoria. The company was a subject and later censured by the 1905 Royal Commission on the butter industry.

He contested the Electoral district of Mandurang in the 1903 Mandurang by-election but lost the seat shortly after in the 1904 state election.

== Personal life ==
On 24 October 1883, he married Elizabeth Alice Everitt at St Matthew's Church in Prahran to which they had five daughters.

In 1909 he suffered a stroke in which he partially paralysed. He later died from heart failure while on holiday in St Kilda, Victoria on 17 January 1911.
