= Jim Plowman =

Australian politician

27th Speaker of the Victorian Legislative Assembly
- In office 29 May 1979 – 26 April 1982
- Preceded by: Sir Kenneth Wheeler
- Succeeded by: Tom Edmunds
- In office 14 May 1996 – 2 November 1999
- Preceded by: John Delzoppo
- Succeeded by: Alex Andrianopoulos

Member of the Victorian Legislative Assembly for Evelyn
- In office 19 May 1973 – 2 April 1982
- Preceded by: Russell Stokes
- Succeeded by: Max McDonald
- In office 2 March 1985 – 17 September 1999
- Preceded by: Max McDonald
- Succeeded by: Christine Fyffe

Personal details
- Born: Sidney James Plowman; 13 December 1934 Melbourne, Victoria, Australia
- Died: 3 May 2007 (aged 72)
- Party: Liberal Party
- Spouse: Prudence Sophie Manifold (m. 1970)
- Occupation: Farmer and grazier

Military service
- Allegiance: Australia
- Branch/service: Australian Army
- Years of service: 1957–1959
- Unit: Papua New Guinea Volunteer Rifles

Sidney James Plowman (13 December 1934 – 3 May 2007) was an Australian politician. A Liberal Party member of the Victorian Legislative Assembly, Plowman was Speaker of the Assembly on two occasions, from 1979 to 1982 and from 1996 to 1999.

== Early life ==
Plowman was born in Melbourne to Dr Sidney Plowman of Frankston and his wife Marjorie. He was educated at Geelong Grammar School, after which he was an executive trainee at a civil engineering company in Melbourne. After his national service, he moved to Papua New Guinea, where he worked on a coffee plantation and in a timber milling company. He served in the Papua New Guinea Volunteer Rifles, a battalion of Australia's Citizens Military Forces, from 1957 to 1959.

Upon his return to Australia, he worked as a jackaroo in Queensland and New South Wales. He was appointed as overseer of the "Nareen" property in Western Victoria, then owned by future Prime Minister Malcolm Fraser. He managed his own family's property at Benalla, before moving to Glenburn in 1964.

== Political career ==
In 1959, Plowman had joined the Benalla branch of the Liberal Party. He entered politics as a councillor on the Yea Shire Council in 1970, also marrying Prudence Manifold that year. Three years later, he was elected to state parliament as member of the Legislative Assembly for Evelyn. In 1979, he was elected Speaker of the Assembly, aged 44, he was the youngest Speaker up to that time. Plowman lost his seat at the 1982 state election, and returned to farming for a time until regaining Evelyn in 1985.

When the Liberals won government under Jeff Kennett in 1992, Plowman became Minister for Energy and Minerals (a portfolio he had held in Kennett's shadow cabinet) and Minister Assisting the Treasurer on State Owned Enterprises. He lost the ministry in a 1996 reshuffle, but was elected Speaker for a second time in May 1996, and served as such until his retirement in 1999.

Victorian Legislative Assembly
Preceded by Russell Stokes	Member for Evelyn; 1973–1982	Succeeded by Max McDonald
Preceded by Max McDonald	Member for Evelyn; 1985–1999	Succeeded by Christine Fyffe
Political offices
Preceded by Sir Kenneth Wheeler	Speaker of the Victorian Legislative Assembly; 1979–1982	Succeeded by Tom Edmunds
New ministry	Minister for Energy and Minerals; 1992–1996	Succeeded by Pat McNamara as Minister for Agriculture and Resources
Preceded by John Delzoppo	Speaker of the Victorian Legislative Assembly; 1996–1999	Succeeded by Alex Andrianopoulos
