= John MacGregor (Australian politician) =

Australian politician

John MacGregor (1828 – 27 March 1884) was a politician in colonial Victoria (Australia), and Minister of Mines.

MacGregor was the son of John Macgregor, and was born in the island of Skye, Scotland. He arrived in Victoria in 1840, was admitted a solicitor of the Supreme Court in 1855, and practised in Melbourne, in what was latterly the firm of MacGregor, Ramsay, & Brahe.

MacGregor unsuccessfully contested East Bourke in 1856 and 1861, but after the retirement of Wilson Gray in September 1862 MacGregor was returned for Rodney, for which district he sat in the Victorian Legislative Assembly till March 1874, when he retired from Parliament. MacGregor joined the first James McCulloch Government, and was Minister of Mines from July 1866 to May 1868. On the defeat of the John Alexander MacPherson Ministry in April 1870 MacGregor was asked by the Governor to form a Government, but he recommended that Sir James McCulloch should be sent for. MacGregor brought in, and for the first time carried, a Payment of Members Bill. He had long retired from public life when he died on 27 March 1884 at his home in Gipps street, East Melbourne, Victoria.

He built up a substantial collection of books during his lifetime. His library contained around 10,000 volumes and when it was sold in 1884 it was described as the, “largest private library which has yet been brought to the hammer in this colony.”

Victorian Legislative Assembly
| Preceded by Wilson Gray | Member for Rodney; Nov 1862 – Mar 1874 | Succeeded by Simon Fraser |
