= Speaker of the Victorian Legislative Assembly =

Presiding officer of the lower house of the Parliament of Victoria

Speaker of the Legislative Assembly
- Incumbent; The Honourable; Maree Edwards since 2 August 2022
- Style: The Honourable
- Appointer: Elected by the Victorian Legislative Assembly
- Inaugural holder: Francis Murphy
- Formation: 21 November 1856
- Deputy: Matt Fregon
- Website: Official website Party website

The Speaker of the Victorian Legislative Assembly is the presiding officer of the Victorian Legislative Assembly, the lower house of the Parliament of Victoria. The presiding officer of the upper house of the Parliament of Victoria, the Victorian Legislative Council, is the President of the Victorian Legislative Council.

A Speaker is elected at the beginning of each new parliamentary term by the Legislative Assembly from one of its members. The Assembly may re-elect an incumbent Speaker by passing a motion; otherwise, a secret ballot is held. The Assembly can dismiss the Speaker by a majority vote, and the Speaker can resign.

In practice, the Speaker is usually a member of the governing party or parties, who have the majority in the Assembly. The Speaker continues to be a member of a political party, and may or may not attend party meetings. The Speaker also continues to carry out ordinary electorate duties as a member of Parliament and must take part in an election campaign to be re-elected as a member of Parliament.

The Deputy Speaker, also elected by the Assembly, supports and assists the Speaker and fulfils the role as Speaker in their absence or during a vacancy in the position.

== Speakers of the Victorian Legislative Assembly ==
Speakers
No.	Name	Took office	Left office	Party	Time
1	Francis Murphy	21 November 1856	24 January 1871	—N/a	14 years, 64 days
2	Charles MacMahon	25 April 1871	April 1877	—N/a	6 years, 0 days
3	Charles Gavan Duffy	22 May 1877	9 February 1880	—N/a	2 years, 263 days
(2)	Charles McMahon	11 May 1880	29 June 1880	—N/a	49 days (6 years, 49 days)
4	Peter Lalor	22 July 1880	29 September 1887	—N/a	7 years, 69 days
5	Matthew Davies	4 October 1887	April 1892	—N/a	4 years, 183 days
6	Thomas Bent	11 May 1892	September 1894	—N/a	2 years, 123 days
7	Graham Berry	4 October 1894	September 1897	—N/a	2 years, 335 days
8	Francis Mason	25 October 1897	September 1902	—N/a	4 years, 335 days
9	Duncan Gillies	14 October 1902	12 September 1903	Liberal	333 days
10	William Beazley	16 September 1903	10 May 1904	Labor	237 days
11	Frank Madden	29 June 1904	October 1917	Liberal	13 years, 122 days
12	John Mackey	29 November 1917	6 April 1924	Nationalist	6 years, 129 days
13	John Bowser	30 April 1924	5 March 1927	Nationalist	2 years, 309 days
14	Oswald Snowball	6 July 1927	16 March 1928	Nationalist	254 days
15	Alexander Peacock	4 July 1928	7 October 1933	Nationalist	5 years, 95 days
15	Alexander Peacock	4 July 1928	7 October 1933	United Australia	5 years, 95 days
16	Maurice Blackburn	11 October 1933	1 August 1934	Labor	294 days
17	William Everard	2 August 1934	6 September 1937	United Australia	3 years, 35 days
18	Tom Tunnecliffe	19 October 1937	15 February 1940	Labor	2 years, 119 days
19	William Slater	1 May 1940	20 October 1942	Labor	2 years, 172 days
20	George Knox	21 October 1942	9 October 1947	United Australia	4 years, 353 days
20	George Knox	21 October 1942	9 October 1947	Liberal	4 years, 353 days
21	Thomas Maltby	2 December 1947	13 April 1950	Liberal	2 years, 132 days
22	Archie Michaelis	20 June 1950	31 October 1952	Liberal	2 years, 133 days
23	Keith Sutton	17 December 1952	22 April 1955	Labor	2 years, 126 days
24	William McDonald	15 June 1955	19 March 1967	Liberal	11 years, 277 days
25	Vernon Christie	16 May 1967	18 June 1973	Liberal	6 years, 33 days
26	Kenneth Wheeler	19 June 1973	28 May 1979	Liberal	5 years, 343 days
27	Jim Plowman	29 May 1979	26 April 1982	Liberal	2 years, 332 days
28	Tom Edmunds	27 April 1982	24 October 1988	Labor	6 years, 180 days
29	Ken Coghill	25 October 1988	26 October 1992	Labor	4 years, 1 day
30	John Delzoppo	27 October 1992	13 May 1996	Liberal	3 years, 199 days
(27)	Jim Plowman	14 May 1996	2 November 1999	Liberal	3 years, 172 days (6 years, 139 days)
31	Alex Andrianopoulos	3 November 1999	24 February 2003	Labor	3 years, 113 days
32	Judy Maddigan	25 February 2003	18 December 2006	Labor	3 years, 296 days
33	Jenny Lindell	19 December 2006	20 December 2010	Labor	4 years, 1 day
34	Ken Smith	21 December 2010	4 February 2014	Liberal	3 years, 45 days
35	Christine Fyffe	4 February 2014	22 December 2014	Liberal	321 days
36	Telmo Languiller	23 December 2014	25 February 2017	Labor	2 years, 64 days
37	Colin Brooks	7 March 2017	2 August 2022	Labor	5 years, 148 days
38	Maree Edwards	2 August 2022	Incumbent	Labor	4 years, 91 days
