= Phillip Connell =

Australian politician (1900–1980)

Phillip Patrick Connell (2 November 1900 – 6 June 1980) was an Australian politician.

He was born in Prahran to pickle manufacturer James Joseph Connell and Florence Evans. He attended a Catholic school in Oakleigh and became a pastry cook and grocer near Warburton. He married Susanna Louisa Bennett around 1924; they had five children. From around 1932 he was a life insurance agent. In 1952 he was elected to the Victorian Legislative Assembly as the Labor member for Evelyn. He was defeated in 1958. Around that time he married his second wife, Elsie Eveline Warren. From the 1970s he lived in Queensland, and around 1970 he married Marjorie Jane Bennett. Connell died at Healesville in 1980.

Victorian Legislative Assembly
| Preceded by Roland Leckie | Member for Evelyn; 1952–1958 | Succeeded by Russell Stokes |
