= Lorne, Nova Scotia =

Community in Nova Scotia, Canada

Coordinates: 45°25′39.84″N 62°41′39.01″W

Lorne in Nova Scotia

Lorne is a community in the Canadian province of Nova Scotia, located in Pictou County.

Lorne was originally known as "Big Brook". Sir Simon Fraser, a future Australian senator, was born in the area. His grandson Malcolm Fraser became Prime Minister of Australia.
