= Ewen Hugh Cameron =

Australian politician

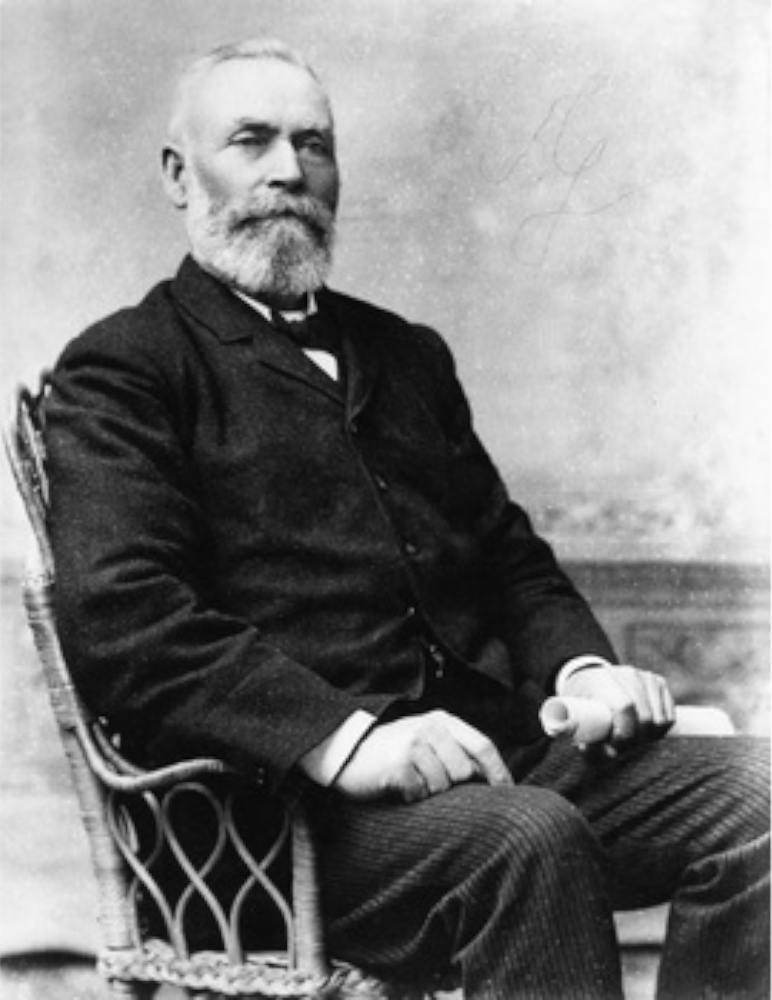
Ewen Hugh Cameron

Ewen Hugh Cameron (24 July 1831 – 27 September 1915) was a builder, store-keeper and politician in colonial Victoria (state of Victoria post 1901), member for Evelyn in the Victorian Legislative Assembly from 1874 to 1914.

Born in Kilmonivaig, Inverness-shire, Scotland, the son of Donald and Ann Cameron, Ewen Cameron arrived in Melbourne in 1853 and was engaged in the building industry with his brothers. He was a storekeeper at Anderson's Creek and Caledonia gold-diggings, a postmaster at Warrandyte in 1857 and farmed at Kangaroo Ground from 1860. Cameron was a member of the Castlemaine mining board and Eltham road board. He was the inaugural Eltham shire president in 1871 and president again later several times.

From 10 June 1902 to 16 February 1904, Cameron served as Minister of Mines and Water Supply. From 16 February 1904 to 31 October 1908, he also served as Minister of Public Health, Commissioner of Public Works, and Vice-President of the Board of Land & Works.

Victorian Legislative Assembly
| Preceded by William Watkins | Member for Evelyn; 1 May 1874 – 1 Nov 1914 | Succeeded by James Rouget |
