= Paul Weller (politician) =

Australian politician

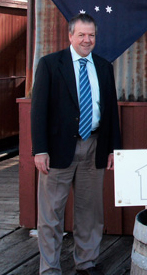
- Weller in 2009

Member of the Victorian Legislative Assembly for Rodney
- In office 25 November 2006 – 29 November 2014
- Preceded by: Noel Maughan
- Succeeded by: Seat abolished

Personal details
- Born: 3 April 1959 (age 67) Rochester, Victoria
- Party: National Party
- Children: 2
- Occupation: Former politician
- Website: paulweller.com.au

Paul Weller (born 3 April 1959) is an Australian politician and was the Nationals member for Rodney in the Victorian Legislative Assembly from 2006 to 2014.

Weller is a former dairy farmer from Lockington in Northern Victoria. Before entering Parliament he served as President of the Victorian Farmers Federation. Weller won pre-selection for Rodney after the retirement of Noel Maughan in 2006. Despite the Labor Party, preferencing his Liberal opponent, Weller won 40% of the primary vote and 54% of the two-party-preferred vote

In February 2014, he was elected Deputy Speaker of the Legislative Assembly under Christine Fyffe. His seat was abolished before the 2014 election and he contested the Legislative Council seat of Northern Victoria in the unwinnable fourth position on the Coalition ticket.

Victorian Legislative Assembly
Preceded by Noel Maughan	Member for Rodney; 2006–2014	Abolished
Preceded by Christine Fyffe	Deputy Speaker of the Legislative Assembly; 2014–present	Incumbent
