= Neville Fraser =

Australian cricketer (1890–1962)

Personal information
- Full name: John Neville Fraser
- Born: 6 August 1890; Toorak, Victoria, Australia
- Died: 23 January 1962 (aged 71); Lindfield, New South Wales, Australia
- Batting: Right-handed
- Bowling: Leg break googly

Domestic team information
- Years: Team
- 1912–1914: Oxford University

Career statistics
Competition	First-class
Matches	17
Runs scored	195
Batting average	11.47
100s/50s	–/–
Top score	33
Balls bowled	2,642
Wickets	59
Bowling average	23.57
5 wickets in innings	4
10 wickets in match	–
Best bowling	6/35
Catches/stumpings	13/–
- Source: Cricinfo, 19 May 2020

John Neville Fraser (6 August 1890 – 23 January 1962) was an Australian first-class cricketer, pastoralist and the father of Australian Prime Minister Malcolm Fraser.

== Early life ==
The son of the businessman, pastoralist, and politician Simon Fraser, he was born in the Melbourne suburb of Toorak in August 1890. He was educated at Melbourne Grammar School, before going up to Trinity College, Melbourne. From there he studied in England at Magdalen College, Oxford.

== Sporting career ==
While studying at Oxford, he played first-class cricket for Oxford University, making his debut against H. K. Foster's XI at Oxford in 1912. He played first-class cricket for Oxford until 1914, making a total of seventeen appearances. Playing primarily as a leg break googly bowler, he took a total of 59 wickets in his seventeen matches for Oxford, at an average of 23.57. He took a five wicket haul on four occasions, with best figures of 6 for 35 against H. D. G. Leveson Gower's XI. A less successful batsman, Fraser scored 195 runs with a high score of 33.

== Military service ==
Fraser was still in England when war was declared on Germany to mark the start of the First World War. He served in the British Army during the war, being commissioned as a second lieutenant in the Royal Artillery in November 1914. He was made a temporary lieutenant in January 1916, with him later seeing action in the Battle of the Somme. He was made an acting captain in December 1916, before taking part in the June 1917 Battle of Messines. He relinquished his acting rank of captain in August 1918, with Fraser relinquishing his commission following the war in January 1919, returning to Australia.

== Later life ==
His father died in July 1919, with Fraser inheriting his property at Balpool-Nyang sheep station of 15,000 hectares (37,000 acres) on the Edward River near Moulamein in the Riverina district of New South Wales. Despite being a trained lawyer, he decided to focus his attention to being a pastoralist, preferring the life of a grazier. He married Una Arnold (née Woolf) at St Mark's Church, Darling Point in 1926. The couple had two children, a daughter Lorraine and a son, Malcolm. He sold Balpool in 1944, moving to Nareen in the Western District of Victoria. Fraser died at the Sydney suburb of Lindfield in January 1962. His son would serve as the Prime Minister of Australia from 1975 to 1983.
