= Roland Leckie =

Australian politician and judge

Roland John Leckie (30 December 1917 – 16 April 1990) was an Australian politician and judge.

He was born in Hawthorn to John Leckie and Hattie Martha Knight. He studied at Scotch College and at Melbourne University, where he received a Bachelor of Arts and a Bachelor of Law. He served in the military from 1937 to 1942 and for the rest of World War II was a member of the Royal Australian Navy reserve. He was a solicitor from 1941 and a barrister from 1946. On 30 April 1949 he married Lesley Anne McCall, with whom he had two daughters. A vice-president of the Liberal and Country Party, he was elected to the Victorian Legislative Assembly for Evelyn in 1950, but was defeated in 1952. He was Crown Prosecutor from 1956 to 1965 and from 1965 served as a judge on the County Court. From 1970 to 1981 he was president of the Industrial Appeals Court of Victoria, and from 1978 to 1981 was president of the Market Court of Victoria. Leckie died in 1990.

Victorian Legislative Assembly
Preceded by William Everard	Member for Evelyn; 1950–1952	Succeeded by Phillip Connell
