= Christine Fyffe =

Australian politician

The Honourable Christine Fyffe MP

Speaker of the Victorian Legislative Assembly
- In office 4 February 2014 – 23 December 2014
- Deputy: Paul Weller
- Preceded by: Ken Smith
- Succeeded by: Telmo Languiller

Member of the Victorian Legislative Assembly for Evelyn
- In office 25 November 2006 – 24 November 2018
- Preceded by: Heather McTaggart
- Succeeded by: Bridget Vallence
- In office 17 September 1999 – 30 November 2002
- Preceded by: Jim Plowman
- Succeeded by: Heather McTaggart

Personal details
- Born: 10 December 1944 (age 81) Staffordshire, England, United Kingdom
- Party: Liberal Party
- Children: 5
- Website: christinefyffe.com.au

Christine Ann Fyffe (born 10 December 1944) is an Australian politician. She was a Liberal member of the Victorian Legislative Assembly from 1999 to 2002 and again from 2006 to 2018, representing Evelyn.

== Personal life ==
Fyffe was born in Staffordshire, England, and was educated at Oldfield Hall Girls' School in the United Kingdom. She arrived in Australia in 1967, later creating with her recently married husband David, the Yarra Burn Winery and Restaurant at Yarra Junction. She now has five children. She supports the Essendon Football Club.

== Political career ==
Fyffe was a vigneron before entering politics, and was appointed by the Kennett State Government as a Commissioner for the Yarra Ranges Shire for the period 1994–97. In 1999, she was selected as the Liberal candidate for Evelyn following the retirement of sitting member Jim Plowman.

In 2002, Fyffe was defeated by Labor candidate Heather McTaggart in the massive Labor landslide of that year. At the following election in 2006, Fyffe again contested Evelyn and defeated McTaggart.

In 2010, Fyffe was elected Deputy Speaker of the Legislative Assembly, under Speaker Ken Smith. When Smith resigned as Speaker on 4 February 2014, the Assembly voted Fyffe in as his replacement.

In October 2016 it was announced that Fyffe would be retiring from her seat at the 2018 election.

Victorian Legislative Assembly
Preceded by Jim Plowman	Member for Evelyn; 1999–2002	Succeeded by Heather McTaggart
Preceded by Heather McTaggart	Member for Evelyn; 2006–2018	Succeeded by Bridget Vallence
Preceded by Ken Smith	Speaker of the Victorian Legislative Assembly; 2014	Succeeded by Telmo Languiller
