= John Baragwanath =

Australian politician and miner

John Dunstan Baragwanath (1817 – 22 January 1885) was a miner and politician in colonial Victoria, a member of the Victorian Legislative Assembly.

Baragwanath was born in St Ives, Cornwall, England, the son of John Dunstan Baragwanath Senior and his wife Mary, nee Quick.

Baragwanath the younger arrived in Victoria in the early 1850s and worked on the goldfields. In November 1856, Baragwanath was elected to the Victorian Legislative Assembly for Rodney, a position he held until resigning in December 1857.

Baragwanath died in Inglewood, Victoria, on 22 January 1885.

Victorian Legislative Assembly
New district	Member for Rodney; November 1856 – December 1857	Succeeded by John Everard
