= Electoral district of Whittlesea =

Former state electoral district in Victoria, Australia

Coordinates: 37°31′S 145°07′E

Whittlesea Victoria—Legislative Assembly
- State: Victoria
- Created: 1985
- Abolished: 1992
- Namesake: Town of Whittlesea
- Demographic: Rural

The Electoral district of Whittlesea was an electoral district of the Legislative Assembly in the Australian state of Victoria.

== Members ==
Member	Party	Term
Max McDonald	Labor	1985–1992
