= James Rouget =

Australian politician

James Rouget (15 April 1866 – 10 June 1924) was an Australian politician.

He was born in Yering to farmer John Rouget and Susan Le Page, both of whom were from Guernsey. He grew up in Wandin and became an orchardist, and on 28 November 1894 married Anne Blanksby, with whom he had seven children. He later worked as a secretary at the Evelyn Preserving Company, rising to the position of general manager. He served on Lillydale Shire Council from 1901 to 1922, with three terms as president (1906–1907, 1909–1910, 1918–1919). In 1914 he was elected to the Victorian Legislative Assembly as the member for Evelyn, but he was defeated at the next election in 1917. He moved to St Kilda in 1922 to become a valuator, but he died in Murrumbeena in 1924.

Victorian Legislative Assembly
Preceded by Ewen Cameron	Member for Evelyn; 1914–1917	Succeeded by William Everard
