= Electoral district of Evelyn =

State electoral district of Victoria, Australia

Evelyn Victoria—Legislative Assembly
- Interactive map of electoral district boundaries from the 2022 state election
- State: Victoria
- Created: 1859
- MP: Bridget Vallence
- Party: Liberal Party
- Namesake: Mount Evelyn
- Electors: 43,159 (2018)
- Area: 255 km^{2} (98.5 sq mi)
- Demographic: Rural
- Coordinates: 37°45′S 145°22′E
Electorates around Evelyn:
Eildon	Eildon	Eildon
Croydon	Evelyn	Eildon
Bayswater	Monbulk	Eildon

The electoral district of Evelyn is an electorate of the Victorian Legislative Assembly covering the urban fringe north east of Melbourne. It was first proclaimed in 1859.

The seat has shrunk considerably in size as the eastern suburbs of Melbourne grew. It now includes the suburbs and towns of Coldstream, Gruyere, Lilydale, and Wonga Park.

The seat is usually safe for the Liberal Party but it was won by the Labor Party during their three landslide victories of 1952, 1982 and 2002.

At the 2006 election Christine Fyffe regained the seat for the Liberals, defeating Heather McTaggart. Fyffe was re-elected to the district at the 2010 and 2014 Victorian state elections.

== Members ==
Member	Party	Term
John Charles King	Unaligned	1859–1859
William Bell	Unaligned	1859–1860
William Jones	Unaligned	1860–1863
John Thomson	Unaligned	1863–1865
William Watkins	Unaligned	1866–1874
Ewen Hugh Cameron	Conservative	1874–1909
Ewen Hugh Cameron	Commonwealth Liberal	1909–1914
James Rouget	Commonwealth Liberal	1914–1917
James Rouget	Nationalist	1917–1917
William Everard	Economy	1917–1918
William Everard	Nationalist	1918–1924
William Everard	Independent	1924–1924
William Everard	United Australia	1924–1945
William Everard	Liberal	1945–1950
Roland Leckie	Liberal	1950–1952
Phillip Connell	Labor	1952–1958
Russell Stokes	Liberal	1958–1973
Jim Plowman	Liberal	1973–1982
Max McDonald	Labor	1982–1985
Jim Plowman	Liberal	1985–1999
Christine Fyffe	Liberal	1999–2002
Heather McTaggart	Labor	2002–2006
Christine Fyffe	Liberal	2006–2018
Bridget Vallence	Liberal	2018–present

== Election results ==
2022 Victorian state election: Evelyn
Party	Candidate	Votes	%	±%
Liberal	Bridget Vallence	20,385	46.7	−1.8
Labor	Lorna Dent	14,277	32.7	−8.0
Greens	Andrew Henley	4,052	9.3	−0.4
Family First	Jeanette Dobson	2,318	5.3	+5.3
Animal Justice	Jan Heald	1,819	4.2	+4.2
Independent	Nat De Francesco	448	1.0	+1.0
Independent	Rosalie De Francesco	366	0.8	+0.8
Total formal votes		43,664	95.1	+0.8
Informal votes		2,255	4.9	−0.8
Turnout		45,919	91.5	+2.6
Two-party-preferred result
Liberal	Bridget Vallence	24,190	55.4	+3.6
Labor	Lorna Dent	19,474	44.6	−3.6
Liberal hold		Swing	+3.6	

=== Graphical summary ===
Distribution of preference results in Evelyn. View source data.

== Historical maps ==
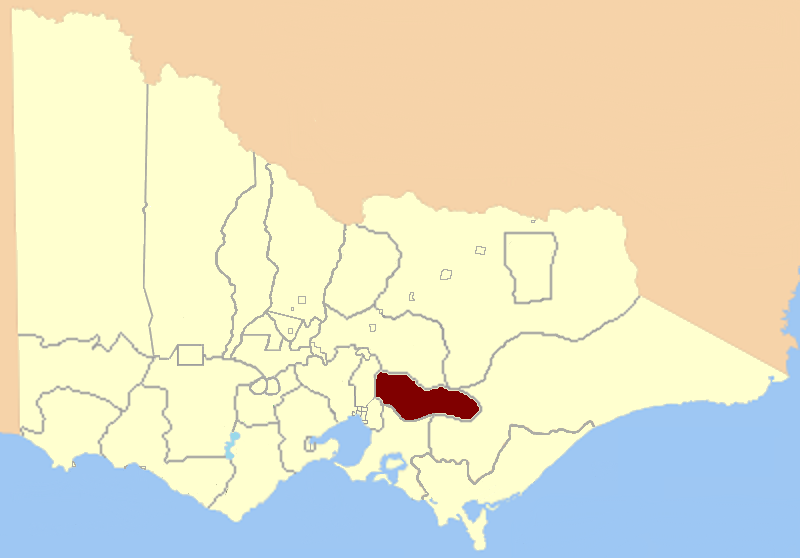
Location of Evelyn in 1859
