= James Shackell =

Australian politician (1833–1899)

Member of the Victorian Legislative Assembly for Rodney
- In office 1 February 1883 – 1 April 1892 Serving with Duncan Gillies and William Webb
- Preceded by: Simon Fraser
- Succeeded by: Timothy Murphy

Personal details
- Born: 12 January 1833 Bath, England
- Died: 25 April 1899 (aged 66) Armadale, Colony of Victoria

James Shackell (12 January 1833 – 25 April 1899) was an English-born Australian politician and merchant. He served as a member of the Victorian Legislative Assembly.

== Biography ==
James Shackell was born 12 January 1833 in Bath, England. He was the son of James Shackell and Ann Shackell (née Mills). He emigrated to Victoria, arriving in January 1853.

He held a business as a merchant on the goldfields, which he sold in 1858 to the Oriental Bank and travelled to England. While in Kent, he married Annie Littlewood. Upon returning to Australia in 1859, he worked as a sheep auctioneer in both Victoria and New South Wales. In 1863, he began working as a station agent and auctioneer in Echuca. He was a senior partner of the firm of cattle salesmen and auctioneers, Messrs Shackell, White, and Co.

In 1859, he was appointed a Justice of the Peace in Victoria. He was appointed in New South Wales in 1865 and in South Australia in 1881. He was Mayor of Echuca from 1878 to 1882, previously having been the President of the Shire of Echuca in 1877.

He contested the Electoral district of Rodney at the 1868 Victorian colonial election, the 1877 Victorian colonial election, and the 1877 Rodney colonial by-election, at all of which he was unsuccessful. The by-election was held because the results at the 1877 election were too close to be certain and Shackell challenged their validity. Shackell won election for Rodney at the 1883 Victorian colonial election as a Conservative member. In May 1889, Shackell wrote a letter to Premier Duncan Gillies advocating for the agricultural industry, including the community's desire for there to be a Minister for Agriculture. Until a few months prior, Gillies had been the other member for Rodney. Shackell lost his seat at the 1892 Victorian colonial election.

He died on 25 April 1899 in Armadale, aged 66, from complications related to gout.
