= Russell McDonald =

Australian politician

Russell Stanley Leslie McDonald (12 May 1913 – 20 January 1980) was an Australian politician.

== Biography ==
McDonald was born in Kyabram to labourer Donald Alexander Leslie McDonald and Jessie Taylor. He ran a service station in Echuca before entering politics, and was also a local councillor (1947–58) and mayor (1956–58). Around 1938 he married Barbara Catherine Hall, with whom he had three children. In 1964 he was elected to the Victorian Legislative Assembly as the Country Party member for Rodney. He held the seat until his retirement in 1973. McDonald died at Echuca in 1980.

Victorian Legislative Assembly
Preceded by Richard Brose	Member for Rodney; 1964–1973	Succeeded by Eddie Hann
