= John Charles King =

Australian politician

John Charles King (10 July 1817 – 26 January 1870) was a politician in colonial Victoria (Australia) who served as the Commissioner of Public Works in October and November 1859.

King was born in Dromara, County Down, Ireland, the son of Henry King (died 1840), a farmer, and his wife Martha Jane, née Henry.

King was educated at the Royal Belfast Academical Institution. He sailed for Australia in 1838. In Sydney, he was impressed with reports of the Port Phillip District. He returned to Ireland, married Elizabeth Johnston, of Annandale, Scotland, and again sailed for Australia with his parents and family. In January 1841, King arrived aboard the Salsette in Melbourne, where he became an auctioneer and commission agent in Elizabeth Street. Later he briefly served as a government auctioneer.

King was Town Clerk of Melbourne from the establishment of the municipality in 1842 until 1861, when he was sent to England as the agent of the Victorian branch of the Anti-Transportation Association. He sailed on April 3, and rendered good service in thwarting Earl Grey's policy as regarded the despatch of convicts to Tasmania and Moreton Bay in 1862. On his return to Melbourne he entered the Victorian Legislative Assembly for Evelyn, and joined the William Nicholson Ministry in October 1859. He served as the Vice-President of the Board of Land and Works and Commissioner of Public Works from 27 October 1859 to 25 November 1859.

King died at sea on 26 January 1870 while returning from a health visit to Tasmania; his death was due to chronic bronchitis and a liver complaint. King was buried in the Presbyterian section of the Old Melbourne Cemetery in Queen Street, survived by his wife, two sons and three daughters.
