= Eddie Hann =

Australian politician

Edward James "Eddie" Hann (8 May 1946 – 9 September 1990) was an Australian politician.

He was born in Rochester, Victoria, to Edward Albert Hann, a dairy farmer, and Kathleen Margaret Smith. He attended Lockington Consolidated School before becoming a dairy farmer in the Lockington area. He was deputy state president of Victorian Young Farmers from 1967 to 1968.

A member of the Country Party, Hann was elected to the Victorian Legislative Assembly in 1973 as the member for Rodney. During his tenure he was parliamentary spokesman on public works and youth affairs, dairying and housing, and education and the arts, as well as deputy leader. He resigned from parliament in 1989, and died the following year.

Victorian Legislative Assembly
Preceded by Russell McDonald	Member for Rodney; 1973–1989	Succeeded by Noel Maughan
