= Richard Brose =

Australian politician

Richard Keats Brose (6 May 1897 – 14 May 1969) was an Australian politician.

Brose was born in Colac to law clerk Joseph Frederick Brose and Ellen Elizabeth Catt. He was twice wounded serving with the AIF during World War I, and was a dairy farmer after the war and active in the Returned and Services League and the Country Party. On 20 October 1926 he married Audrey Dare. He served on Deakin Shire Council from 1939 to 1947.

In 1944 Brose won a by-election for the Victorian Legislative Assembly seat of Rodney; although not the endorsed Country Party candidate, he was president of the local branch of the party and joined it in parliament. From 1950 to 1952 he was Minister of Water Supply and Conservation. Brose retired from politics in 1964 and died at Echuca on 14 May 1969.

Victorian Legislative Assembly
Preceded by William Dunstone	Member for Rodney; 1944–1964	Succeeded by Russell McDonald
