= William Dunstone =

Australian politician

William Dunstone (27 October 1877 – 12 April 1944) was an Australian politician.

He was born in Newstead to farmer James Dunstone and Elizabeth Jane Winn. He grew up around Seymour, where he attended state schools and worked on his father's farm. In 1908 he married Victoria Elizabeth Greer, with whom he had a son. Dunstone acquired his own farm at Wanurp, and served on Rochester Shire Council from 1920 to 1942, with two terms as president (1923–24, 1933–34). A founding member of the Country Party, he won a by-election for the Victorian Legislative Assembly seat of Rodney in 1936. He was secretary of the parliamentary Country Party from 1942 to 1944, when he died in Bendigo.

Victorian Legislative Assembly
Preceded by John Allan	Member for Rodney; 1936–1944	Succeeded by Richard Brose
