= John Everard (Australian politician) =

Australian politician

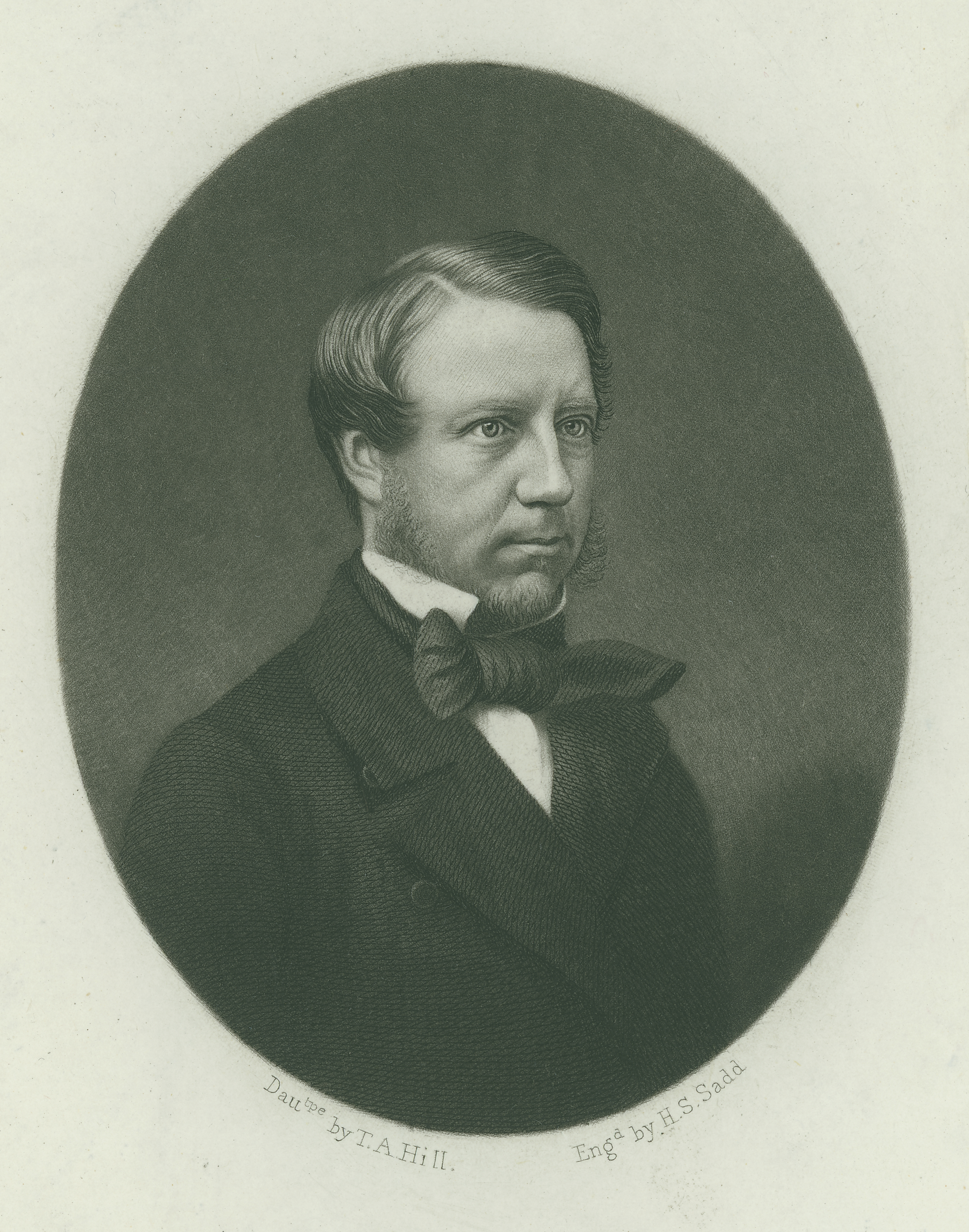
John Everard (1825-1886) by Henry Samuel Sadd in State Library, Victoria

John Everard (20 February 1825 – 29 August 1886) was an Australian politician, serving in the Victorian Legislative Assembly. He was baptised on 7 April 1825 at Ratby, Leicestershire, England.

Everard was born at Groby, Leicestershire, the son of Thomas Everard, farmer, and his wife Mary, née Breedon.

Everard emigrated to Australia aboard the Adelaide, arriving in Melbourne on 11 May 1853 (James McCulloch, later Premier of Victoria, was a fellow passenger).

Everard served in the Victorian Legislative Assembly as Member for the electoral districts of Rodney from January 1858 to December 1859; North Gippsland in August 1861 (elected, but not sworn in as he had become insolvent) and again from April 1864 to August 1864; and Collingwood March 1868 to January 1871 and again May 1874 to July 1874 (resigned because he had become insolvent again).

Everard was a tea merchant and also a stock and share broker. He was Chairman of the National Eight Hours League and also Chairman of the Victorian Industries Protection League. Everard died on 29 August 1886 at South Yarra.

Everard was the father of William Everard who served as a Member and also Speaker of the Victorian Legislative Assembly.

Political offices
Victorian Legislative Assembly
Preceded by John Baragwanath	Member for Rodney; Jan 1858 – Dec 1859	Succeeded by Wilson Gray
Preceded by George Mackay	Member for North Gippsland; Apr 1864 – Aug 1864	Succeeded by William Pearson, Sr.
Preceded by Thomas Embling	Member for Collingwood; Mar 1868 – Jan 1871; Served alongside: W. Bates, I. Reeves / G. Harker	Succeeded by William Vale
Preceded by William Vale	Member for Collingwood; May 1874 – Jul 1874; Served alongside: James Sullivan, Albert Tucker	Succeeded by George Langridge
