= Bridget Vallence =

Australian politician

Bridget Vallence MP

Member of the Victorian Legislative Assembly for Evelyn
- Incumbent
- Assumed office 24 November 2018
- Preceded by: Christine Fyffe

Personal details
- Party: Liberal Party

Bridget Vallence is an Australian politician. She was elected to the Victorian Parliament in November 2018 to represent the Evelyn District. She has served as Shadow Minister for Finance since January 2025, Shadow Minister for Jobs and Skills since November 2025, and Shadow Minister for Trade and Investment since January 2026.

Vallence previously served as Manager of Opposition Business from January to October 2025 and Shadow Minister for WorkSafe and the TAC from October to November 2025. From 2021 to 2025, she held a number of shadow portfolios including Manufacturing, Industry, Innovation, Skills and Training, Tertiary Education, Employment and Industrial Relations, and Trade and Investment.

From March 2020 to September 2021, Vallence served as Shadow Minister for Environment and Climate Change and Shadow Minister for Youth Affairs, as well as Shadow Minister for Equality from March to September 2021. She was Shadow Cabinet Secretary and Shadow Assistant Minister for Industry from December 2018 to March 2020.

Vallence has served on Parliament’s Public Accounts and Estimates Committee and has been a member of the Legislative Assembly Standing Orders Committee since February 2025. She is also a board member of VicHealth, a statutory foundation that promotes health and disease prevention.

Prior to entering Parliament, Vallence worked for 16 years in the automotive industry as a procurement professional in the manufacturing and retail sectors across Australian, Asian and global markets. She holds a Bachelor of Arts and Bachelor of Commerce (Honours) from the University of Melbourne.

Parliament of Victoria
| Preceded by Christine Fyffe | Member for Evelyn; 2018–present | Incumbent |
