= Max McDonald =

Australian politician (1927–2019)

Maxwell John McDonald (18 April 1927 – 28 August 2019) was an Australian politician.

He was born in Essendon, to RAAF officer Ewen McColl McDonald and Hilda Ferguson. He attended state and technical schools before becoming an electrical operations officer and electrician. He joined the Labor Party in 1952, and was three times president of the Eildon-Alexandra branch. In 1982 he was elected to the Victorian Legislative Assembly as the member for Evelyn, moving to Whittlesea in 1985. His seat was abolished in 1992 and he retired.

Victorian Legislative Assembly
Preceded by Jim Plowman	Member for Evelyn; 1979–1985	Succeeded by Jim Plowman
New seat	Member for Whittlesea; 1985–1992	Abolished
