= Andrew White (Australian politician) =

Australian politician

Andrew William Henry White (1859 – 3 November 1936) was an Australian politician.

Born in Emerald Hill, Victoria, White attended Williamstown Grammar School before becoming a clerk with the Colonial Bank in 1874, managing the Fitzroy branch from 1879 and the Echuca branch from 1883. He resigned from the bank in 1885 to join James Shackell in the Echuca auctioneering firm Shackell, White & Co. In 1886, he married Mary Leonard, with whom he had two sons. He was mayor of Echuca from 1893 to 1894 and from 1906 to 1907. In 1894 he was elected to the Victorian Legislative Assembly as the member for Rodney, serving until 1897. He purchased the Wharparilla station in 1907 and was Rochester shire president from 1919 to 1929. He died in Melbourne in 1936.
