= Electoral district of Rodney =

Former state electoral district of Victoria, Australia

Rodney Victoria—Legislative Assembly
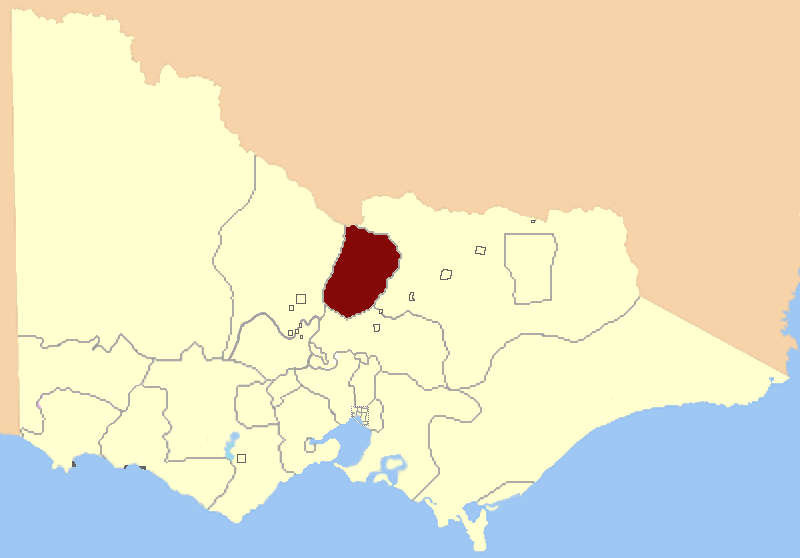
- Location in Victoria, 1856
- State: Victoria
- Created: 1856
- Abolished: 2014
- Electors: 36,437 (2010)
- Area: 7,808 km^{2} (3,014.7 sq mi)
- Demographic: Rural
- Coordinates: 36°20′S 144°55′E

The Electoral district of Rodney was a Victorian Legislative Assembly electorate in Northern Victoria.

The Rodney District covered an area of 7,808 square kilometres, including the towns of Echuca, Rochester, Nathalia, Cohuna, Heathcote, Gunbower, Kyabram, Rushworth and Stanhope.

At inception in 1856, the district boundaries include the Murray River and Goulburn River in the north and east; and the Campaspe River in the west. By 1956 the district had expanded further westward to include Cohuna.

In 2014, it was abolished and became part of the electoral district of Murray Plains.

== Electoral history ==
Until its abolition, Rodney was one of only four electorates (along with Brighton, Richmond and Williamstown) to have been contested at every election since 1856. It was held by the Victorian Farmers Union/Country/National Party from 1917. John Allan, who was the first Country Party Member for the district, became Australia's first Country Party Premier in 1924.

In the 2006 election, Paul Weller won the seat for the National Party with a margin of 4.39% against the Liberals. The Liberal Party did not run in this electorate in the 2010 election, leaving the Nationals with a much higher lead against the other parties.

== Members for Rodney ==
Member 1	Party	Term			
John Baragwanath	Unaligned	1856–1857			
John Everard	Liberal	1858–1859			
Wilson Gray	Liberal	1860–1862			
John MacGregor	Unaligned	1862–1874			
Simon Fraser	Ministerial	1874–1883	Member 2	Party	Term
Simon Fraser	Ministerial	1874–1883	Duncan Gillies	Ministerial	1877–1889
James Shackell	Conservative/Ministerial	1883–1892	William Webb	Ministerial	1889–1897
Timothy Murphy	Liberal	1892–1894	William Webb	Ministerial	1889–1897
Andrew White	Unaligned	1894–1897	William Webb	Ministerial	1889–1897
John Mason	Liberal	1897–1902	John Morrissey	Liberal	1897–1904
Samuel Lancaster	Conservative	1904–1904	John Morrissey	Liberal	1897–1904
Hugh McKenzie	Independent	1904–1917			
Hugh McKenzie	Commonwealth Liberal	1904–1917			
Hugh McKenzie	Nationalist	1904–1917			
John Allan	Country	1917–1936			
William Dunstone	Country	1936–1944			
Richard Brose	Country	1944–1964			
Russell McDonald	Country	1964–1973			
Eddie Hann	Country	1973–1975			
Eddie Hann	National Country	1975–1982			
Eddie Hann	National	1982–1989			
Noel Maughan	National	1989–2006			
Paul Weller	National	2006–2014			

== Election results ==
2010 Victorian state election: Rodney
Party	Candidate	Votes	%	±%
National	Paul Weller	20,524	62.71	+22.55
Labor	Vanessa Langford	5,290	16.16	−1.97
Country Alliance	Gino D'Angelo	3,697	11.30	+11.30
Family First	Serena Moore	1,872	5.72	+2.33
Greens	Ian Christoe	1,348	4.12	+0.92
Total formal votes		32,731	95.59	+0.82
Informal votes		1,509	4.41	−0.82
Turnout		34,240	93.97	−0.34
Two-party-preferred result
National	Paul Weller	24,947	76.16	+21.96
Labor	Vanessa Langford	7,809	23.84	+23.84
National hold		Swing	+21.96	

== See also ==
- Parliaments of the Australian states and territories
- List of members of the Victorian Legislative Assembly
