= Simon Fraser (Australian politician) =

Australian politician (1832–1919)

The Honourable Sir Simon Fraser
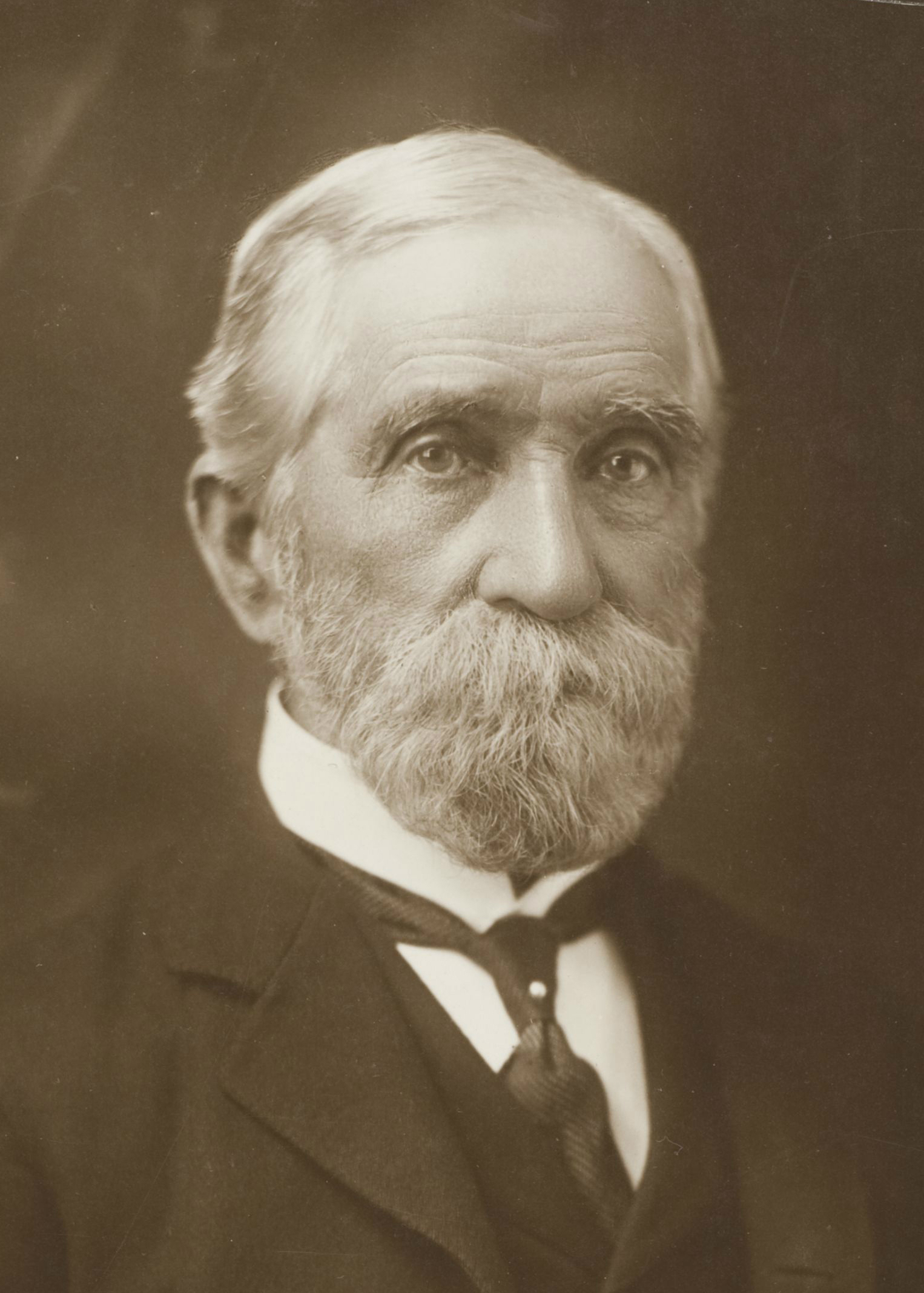

Senator for Victoria
- In office 29 March 1901 – 30 June 1913

Member of the Victorian Legislative Council
- In office August 1886 – March 1901
- Preceded by: James Graham
- Succeeded by: Edmund Smith
- Constituency: South Yarra

Member of the Victorian Legislative Assembly
- In office May 1874 – February 1883
- Preceded by: John MacGregor
- Succeeded by: James Shackell
- Constituency: Rodney

Personal details
- Born: 21 August 1832 Big Brook, Nova Scotia, Canada
- Died: 30 July 1919 (aged 86) Melbourne, Victoria, Australia
- Party: Protectionist (1901–06); Anti-Socialist (1906–09); Liberal (1909–13)
- Spouses: Margaret Bolger (m. 1865–1880) Anne Collins (m. 1885)
- Children: 5, inc. Neville and Simon Jr.
- Relatives: Robert Collins (brother-in-law); Malcolm Fraser (grandson)
- Occupation: Contractor, grazier

Sir Simon Fraser (21 August 1832 – 30 July 1919) was a Canadian-Australian businessman, pastoralist, and politician. He was a Senator for Victoria from 1901 to 1913, having previously been a member of the colonial Parliament of Victoria.

== Early life ==
Fraser was born on 21 August 1832 in Big Brook (now known as Lorne), a small rural township in Pictou County, Nova Scotia, Canada. He was the youngest son of Jane (née Fraser) and William Fraser. His parents shared the same surname, although no familial connection has been noted between the two. Fraser's father was born in Beauly, Inverness-shire, Scotland, and claimed descent from Clan Fraser of Lovat. He arrived in Nova Scotia in 1801, as a small child.

According to Fraser, his mother spoke fluent Canadian Gaelic and one of his grandfathers spoke "very little English". In 1906, he became the inaugural patron of the Gaelic Society of Victoria, an organisation devoted to keeping the Scottish Gaelic language and customs alive in Australia. In an address to the society, he said that he could speak only a few sentences of Gaelic, but that he could still understand most conversations.

In 1839, when Fraser was seven years old, his father was killed in a sawmilling accident. He began working on the family farm at a young age, and received limited formal schooling. Attracted by the Victorian gold rush, he immigrated to Australia at the age of 21, arriving in Melbourne in 1853. He immediately went to the goldfields at Bendigo, where he turned a profit selling supplies to miners.

== Business career ==
In 1855, Fraser moved to Melbourne and opened a store on Elizabeth Street, where he engaged in horse trading and imported produce from Sydney. He later expanded into construction and began tendering for government road, bridge and railway contracts. His business partners included Jenkin Collier and William McCulloch.

One of his more notable contracts was to supply ballast to the Deniliquin and Moama Railway Company, a privately owned railway which connected Moama on the Murray River to Deniliquin in southern New South Wales. Instead of supplying blue metal, Fraser supplied quartz from the slag heaps of Bendigo gold mines. It met the specifications of the contract, but was not what was expected by the owners of the railway.

In the mid-1860s, Fraser established the Squatting Investment Company with Thomas Craig, William Forrest, and George Simmie. The company acquired pastoral leases on the Dawson River in Central Queensland, which were consolidated into Mount Hutton Station, as well as Bundaleer and Thurulgoona in South West Queensland. Fraser later acquired further properties in the Riverina of New South Wales and the Western District of Victoria, becoming a leader of the wealthy wool-growing class known as the Squattocracy.

== Politics ==
Fraser was elected to the Victorian Legislative Assembly for the seat of Rodney in 1874, which he held until 1883. In 1886, he was elected to the Victorian Legislative Council, the traditional preserve of the squatters, representing South Yarra Province, and remained a member until 1901. He was a Minister without Portfolio from 1890 to 1892. He was a Victorian delegate to the 1894 Colonial Conference in Ottawa, and a member of the Constitutional Convention which drafted the Australian Constitution.

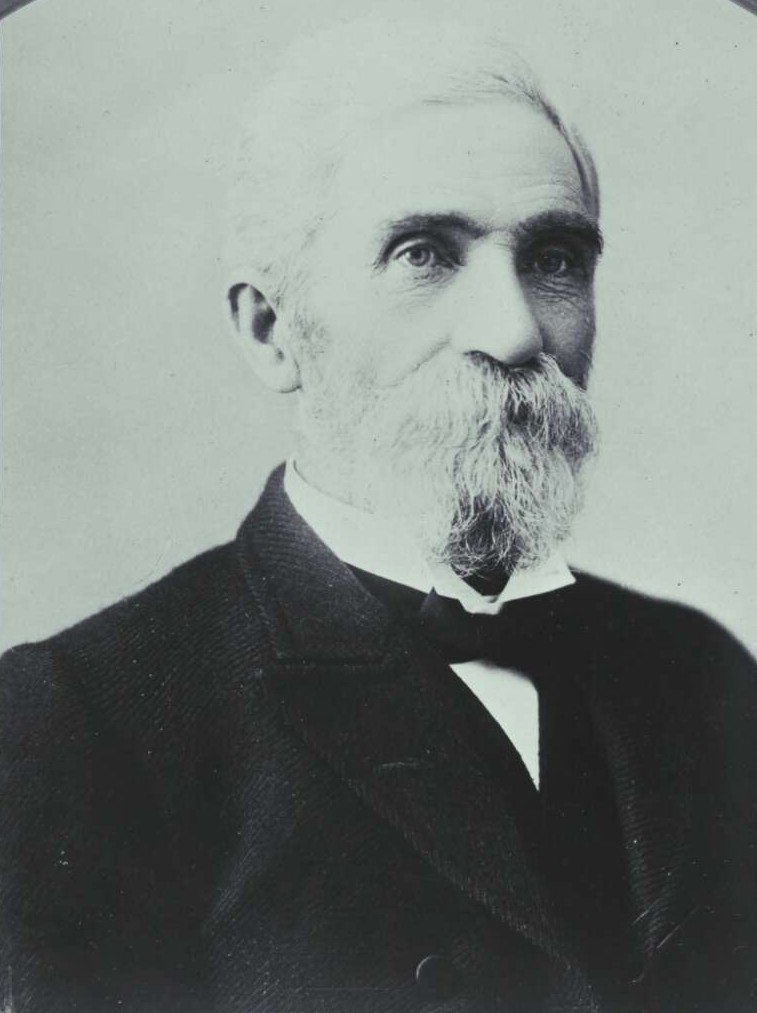
Fraser at the 1897-1898 Australasian Federal Convention

In 1901, following the federation of the Australian colonies, Fraser was elected as one of the first six Victorian members of the Australian Senate, remaining a senator until his retirement in 1913. When elected he was a supporter of prime minister Edmund Barton's Protectionist Party, but he was not favourable to Barton's more liberal successor, Alfred Deakin, and sat as an independent conservative until 1909, when he joined Deakin's new Commonwealth Liberal Party, although belonging to its conservative wing. He was awarded a knighthood in the 1918 New Year Honours, becoming Sir Simon Fraser.

== Personal life ==
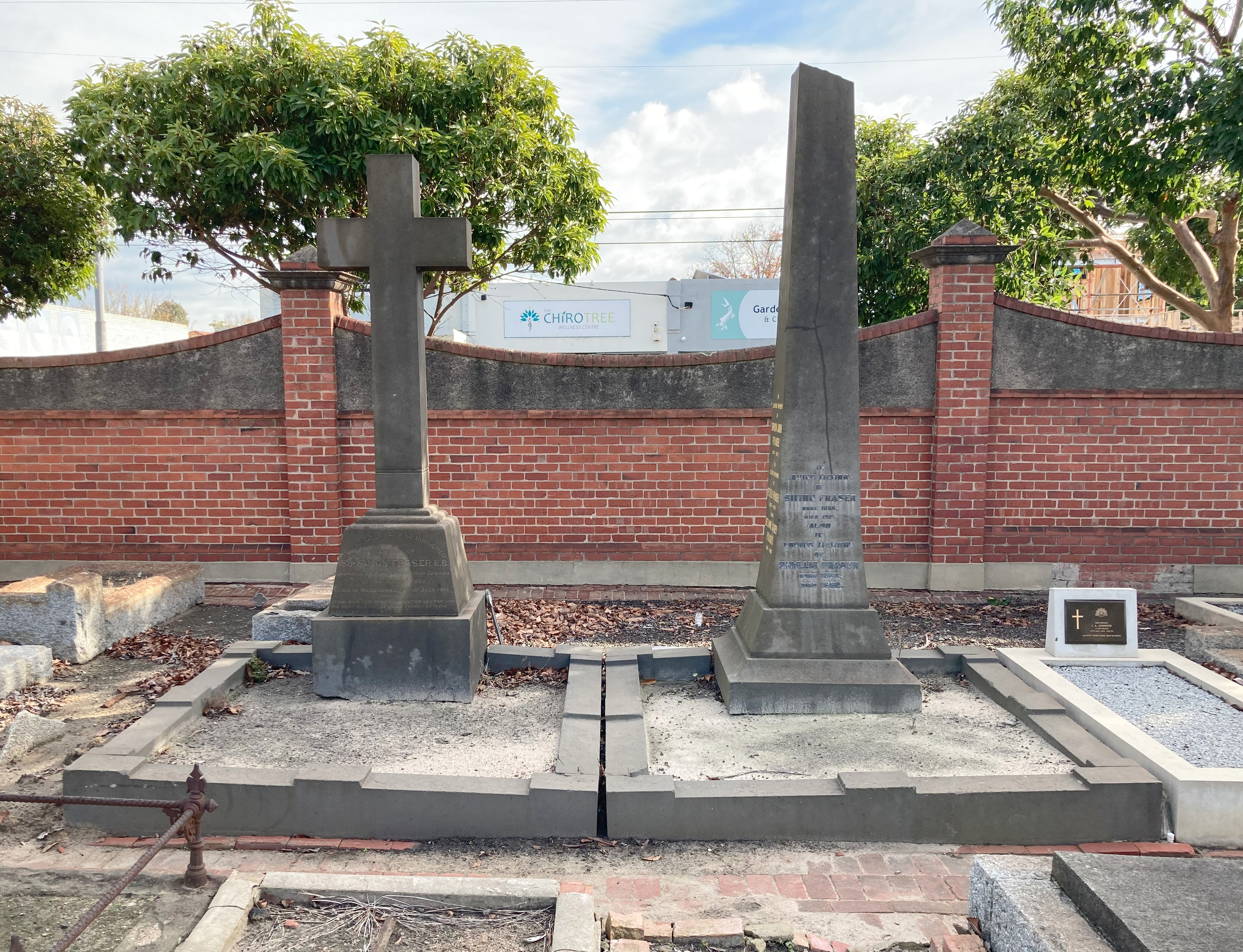
Graves of Fraser (left) and his son Simon Fraser Jr. (right) at Brighton General Cemetery

Fraser married Margaret Bolger in 1862, with whom he had two daughters. He was widowed in 1880 and remarried in 1885 to Anna Collins, the sister of Queensland MP Robert Martin Collins. He had three sons from his second marriage, including Simon and Neville who were both high-level athletes. Neville's son Malcolm Fraser was prime minister of Australia from 1975 to 1983.

Fraser died of bronchitis on 30 July 1919, aged 86, in Melbourne, and was buried at Brighton General Cemetery. He was survived by his wife, Anne, a daughter and two sons.
