= Noel Maughan =

Australian politician

Noel John Maughan OAM (born 20 December 1935) was an Australian politician and the Nationals member for Rodney in the Victorian Legislative Assembly from 1989 until 2006.

Prior to entering Parliament at a by-election in March 1989, Maughan was an active member of the agriculture sector. He was the Chairman of the Pig Council of the Victorian Farmers Federation, the spokesman on animal welfare for the Australian Pig Industry, a Member of the Australian Pork Producers' Federation, and of the Pig Research Council. He also served on the Minister for Agriculture's Animal Welfare Advisory Committee and on Melbourne University's School of Agriculture Animal Ethics Committee.

Maughan was a member of four All Party Parliamentary Committees during his time in office:

- Social Development Committee – Deputy Chair (1989–1992)
- Community Development Committee (1992–1996)
- Law Reform Committee (1996–1999)
- Law Reform Committee – Deputy Chair (1999–2006)

He served two terms as Temporary Chairman of Committees of the Legislative Assembly, was National Party Whip, and was a member of both the House Committee and the Privileges Committee of the Legislative Assembly.

Maughan served as a member of the Swinburne University Council 1992–98 and as a Director of Murray Goulburn Co-Op 1968–72.

He was a charter member of Pakenham Rotary Club and a member of both Shepparton and Echuca Rotary Clubs, and was a charter member and Club President of the Tongala Apex Club.

Maughan retired at the 2006 election and his seat was retained by the National Party. The final member was Paul Weller, as the district was abolished in 2014.

Maughan received the Medal of the Order of Australia (OAM) in the 2014 Australia Day Honours for "service to the Parliament of Victoria, to agriculture, and to rural health".

== See also ==
- List of Caulfield Grammar School people
