= Russell Stokes =

Australian politician (1903–1974)

Russell Newton Stokes (26 August 1903 – 6 July 1974) was an Australian politician.

Born in Ivanhoe to manufacturer Henry Richmond Stokes and Emma Rowdon Wippell. He attended Melbourne Grammar School and became a manufacturer with the family badge- and medallion-making firm, Stokes & Sons, based in Brunswick. He was the managing director and chairman of the company from 1932 to 1974.

Stokes also owned a 600-acre dairy and Angus property at Yarra Glen and further property at Yea. He married Margaret Black, with whom he had three children, on 16 November 1935. In 1944, he was the co-author of Political Rehabilitation in Australia, in which year he was also a foundation member of the Liberal Party. He sat on the member qualifications committee from 1954 to 1956, and in 1958 was elected to the Victorian Legislative Assembly as the member for Evelyn. He served until his retirement in 1973 and died in 1974 at Cairns. He is buried at Warringal Cemetery at Heidelberg.
