= Wilson Gray =

Australian politician (1813–1875)

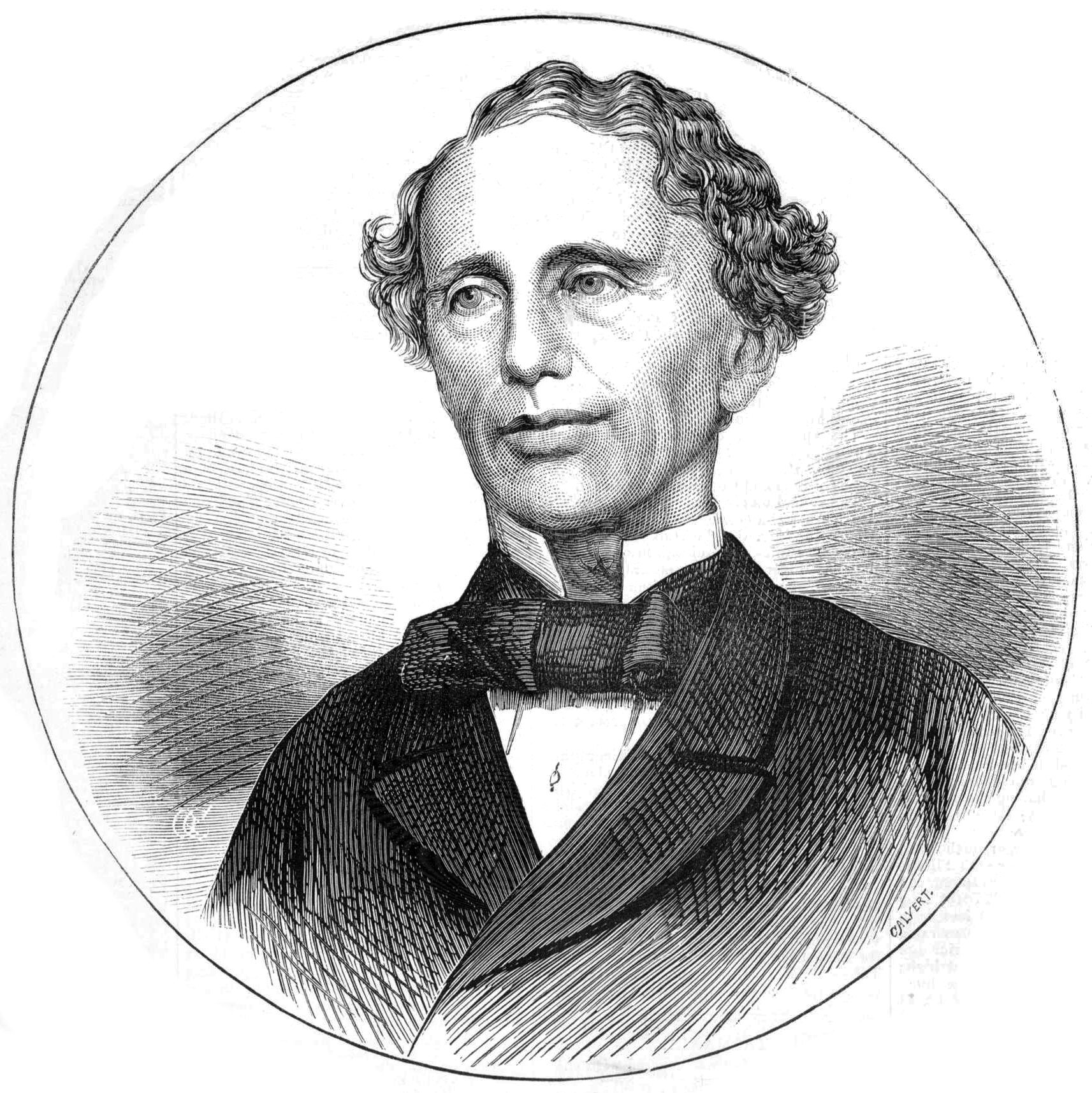
Wilson Gray, 1875 engraving

Moses Wilson Gray, known as Wilson Gray (1813 – 4 April 1875) was an Irish-born barrister, member of the Victorian Legislative Assembly and district judge in New Zealand.

Gray born in Claremorris, County Mayo, Ireland, the son of John Gray and his wife Elizabeth, née Wilson.

Gray decided to emigrate to Victoria (Australia), and with Charles Gavan Duffy, sailed in the Ocean Chief arriving in Melbourne in 1856. Gray took an active part in the solution of the land question on liberal lines, and was one of the founders of the Victoria Land League, under whose auspices was summoned a great assemblage of delegates from all parts of Victoria to discuss the land question with a view to promoting the settlement of a farming population on the public estate. The Land Convention, as it was called, met in Melbourne in 1857, and condemned the abortive Haines Land Bill then passing through the Lower House. Wilson Gray was elected the president of the Convention, which also passed resolutions in favour of manhood suffrage, equal electoral districts, abolition of property qualification, and payment of representatives.

Gray was member of the Victorian Legislative Assembly for Rodney from January 1860 to September 1862, when he went to Otago, New Zealand, and became a district court judge. He died in Lawrence, Otago, New Zealand on 4 April 1875.

The central Victorian goldrush town Graytown was named after Mr Gray in 1869.
