= William Everard (Victorian politician) =

Australian politician (1869–1950)

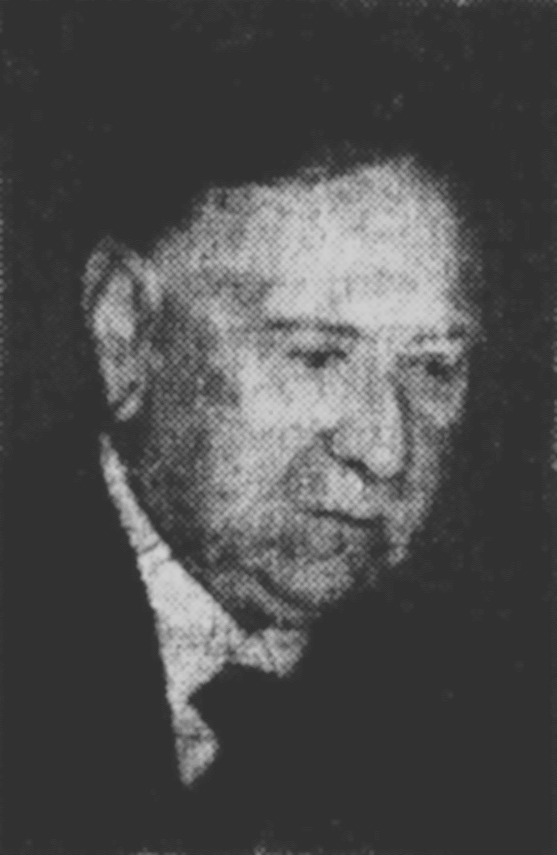
William H. Everard.

William Hugh Everard (28 Nov 1869 – 12 April 1950), Australian politician, was a Member of the Victorian Legislative Assembly for the Electoral district of Evelyn from 1917 until his retirement in 1950. He is the son of John Everard, who was a member of the Victorian Legislative Assembly holding non-contiguous terms between 1858 and 1874.

Everard was born in East Melbourne and was educated at Mornington Grammar School and Scotch College. He was a partner and eventually proprietor of the family firm, Everard Brothers, in business as tea merchants. Everard was Chairman of the Sir Colin Mackenzie Sanctuary, Healesville, from 1949–1950, President of Old Scotch Collegians and a founder and president of Old Scotch Football Club.

Everard represented the Nationalist Party, the United Australia Party, the Liberal Party and the Liberal and Country Party while a Member of Parliament. He was Speaker of the Legislative Assembly from 1934–1937. He was Minister of Lands and Forests in the Macfarlan government from October–November 1945.

Everard died on April 12, 1950. His wife, Hannah Clarissa Smith, died in 1943.
