= Results of the 1982 Victorian state election (Legislative Assembly) =

Australian state election results

Victorian state election, 3 April 1982 Legislative Assembly << 1979–1985 >>
Enrolled voters	2,453,642				
Votes cast	2,305,773		Turnout	93.97	−0.67
Informal votes	60,272		Informal	2.61	−0.40
Summary of votes by party
Party	Primary votes	%	Swing	Seats	Change
Labor	1,122,887	50.01	+4.77	49	+17
Liberal	860,669	38.33	−3.11	24	−17
Democrats	119,083	5.30	+0.10	0	±0
National	111,579	4.97	−0.64	8	±0
Democratic Labor	7,635	0.34	−0.17	0	±0
Independent	23,648	1.05	+1.05	0	±0
Total	2,245,501			81	
Two-party-preferred
Labor	1,207,197	53.8	+4.5		
Liberal	1,037,506	46.2	–4.5		

This is a list of electoral district results for the Victorian 1982 election.

== Results by electoral district ==
=== Albert Park ===
1982 Victorian state election: Albert Park
Party	Candidate	Votes	%	±%
Labor	Bunna Walsh	15,104	62.6	+2.9
Liberal	Reg Macey	7,476	31.0	+0.3
Democrats	Ian Dawes	1,546	6.4	−3.2
Total formal votes		24,126	96.8	+0.4
Informal votes		786	3.2	−0.4
Turnout		24,912	89.9	+1.5
Two-party-preferred result
Labor	Bunna Walsh	15,993	66.3	+2.3
Liberal	Reg Macey	8,133	33.7	−2.3
Labor hold		Swing	+2.3	

=== Ascot Vale ===
1982 Victorian state election: Ascot Vale
Party	Candidate	Votes	%	±%
Labor	Tom Edmunds	17,797	71.7	+3.4
Liberal	David Hayward	7,012	28.3	−3.4
Total formal votes		24,809	95.4	+0.2
Informal votes		1,190	4.6	−0.2
Turnout		25,999	93.7	+1.2
Labor hold		Swing	+3.4	

=== Ballarat North ===
1982 Victorian state election: Ballarat North
Party	Candidate	Votes	%	±%
Liberal	Tom Evans	13,873	52.9	−3.4
Labor	Bill Horrocks	11,107	42.4	−1.3
Democrats	William Ross	1,231	4.7	+4.7
Total formal votes		26,211	98.6	+0.9
Informal votes		383	1.4	−0.9
Turnout		26,594	94.2	−0.6
Two-party-preferred result
Liberal	Tom Evans	14,396	54.9	−1.4
Labor	Bill Horrocks	11,815	45.1	+1.4
Liberal hold		Swing	−1.4	

=== Ballarat South ===
1982 Victorian state election: Ballarat South
Party	Candidate	Votes	%	±%
Labor	Frank Sheehan	13,069	48.8	+3.9
Liberal	Joan Chambers	12,291	45.9	+0.2
Democrats	Stuart Kelly	1,442	5.4	−0.9
Total formal votes		26,802	98.6	+0.6
Informal votes		391	1.4	−0.6
Turnout		27,193	95.0	+0.2
Two-party-preferred result
Labor	Frank Sheehan	13,916	51.9	+2.3
Liberal	Joan Chambers	12,886	48.1	−2.3
Labor gain from Liberal		Swing	+2.3	

=== Balwyn ===
1982 Victorian state election: Balwyn
Party	Candidate	Votes	%	±%
Liberal	Jim Ramsay	15,047	58.1	−0.5
Labor	Nora Sparrow	8,857	34.2	+3.6
Democrats	Russel White	1,995	7.7	−3.1
Total formal votes		25,899	98.5	+0.4
Informal votes		385	1.5	−0.4
Turnout		26,284	93.4	+0.7
Two-party-preferred result
Liberal	Jim Ramsay	15,895	61.4	−4.6
Labor	Nora Sparrow	10,004	38.6	+4.6
Liberal hold		Swing	−4.6	

=== Benalla ===
1982 Victorian state election: Benalla
Party	Candidate	Votes	%	±%
National	Pat McNamara	9,027	36.7	−5.6
Labor	James Ure	8,291	33.7	+0.8
Liberal	Andrew Mein	6,303	25.6	+0.7
Democrats	Rita Dart	975	4.0	+4.0
Total formal votes		24,596	98.5	+0.7
Informal votes		382	1.5	−0.7
Turnout		24,978	93.5	+0.1
Two-party-preferred result
National	Pat McNamara	15,593	63.4	−2.0
Labor	James Ure	9,003	36.6	+2.0
National hold		Swing	−2.0	

=== Benambra ===
1982 Victorian state election: Benambra
Party	Candidate	Votes	%	±%
Liberal	Lou Lieberman	15,413	56.7	+4.2
Labor	Joe Murphy	8,679	32.0	+7.8
National	Charles Ross	3,071	11.3	−8.2
Total formal votes		27,163	97.7	+0.3
Informal votes		643	2.3	−0.3
Turnout		27,806	92.2	−0.7
Two-party-preferred result
Liberal	Lou Lieberman	18,177	66.9	−2.2
Labor	Joe Murphy	8,986	33.1	+2.2
Liberal hold		Swing	−2.2	

=== Bendigo ===
1982 Victorian state election: Bendigo
Party	Candidate	Votes	%	±%
Labor	David Kennedy	12,456	47.6	+5.4
Liberal	Daryl McClure	10,038	38.3	−4.3
Democrats	Ian Price	1,365	5.2	−10.0
Independent	Richard Turner	1,222	4.7	+4.7
Independent	Christopher Stoltz	726	2.8	+2.8
Independent	Joe Pearce	389	1.5	+1.5
Total formal votes		26,196	97.5	−0.7
Informal votes		682	2.5	+0.7
Turnout		26,878	95.7	+0.5
Two-party-preferred result
Labor	David Kennedy	14,372	54.9	+6.1
Liberal	Daryl McClure	11,824	45.1	−6.1
Labor gain from Liberal		Swing	+6.1	

=== Bennettswood ===
1982 Victorian state election: Bennettswood
Party	Candidate	Votes	%	±%
Liberal	Keith McCance	12,400	46.2	−3.9
Labor	Doug Newton	12,104	45.1	+5.6
Democrats	Alan Swindon	2,330	8.7	−1.7
Total formal votes		26,834	98.1	+0.1
Informal votes		509	1.9	−0.1
Turnout		27,343	95.4	+0.8
Two-party-preferred result
Labor	Doug Newton	13,517	50.4	+6.5
Liberal	Keith McCance	13,317	49.6	−6.5
Labor gain from Liberal		Swing	+6.5	

=== Bentleigh ===
1982 Victorian state election: Bentleigh
Party	Candidate	Votes	%	±%
Labor	Gordon Hockley	13,055	51.0	+0.8
Liberal	Ronald Turner	10,477	40.9	−8.9
Democrats	Brian Kidd	1,397	5.5	+5.5
Independent	William Horner	682	2.7	+2.7
Total formal votes		25,605	97.8	+0.6
Informal votes		577	2.2	−0.6
Turnout		26,182	95.7	+0.6
Two-party-preferred result
Labor	Gordon Hockley	14,199	55.4	+5.2
Liberal	Ronald Turner	11,412	44.6	−5.2
Labor hold		Swing	+5.2	

=== Berwick ===
1982 Victorian state election: Berwick
Party	Candidate	Votes	%	±%
Liberal	Rob Maclellan	18,621	51.2	−1.8
Labor	Philip Staindl	17,732	48.8	+11.0
Total formal votes		36,353	97.4	−0.2
Informal votes		965	2.6	+0.2
Turnout		37,318	93.8	+0.7
Liberal hold		Swing	−7.0	

=== Box Hill ===
1982 Victorian state election: Box Hill
Party	Candidate	Votes	%	±%
Labor	Margaret Ray	12,214	46.4	+6.3
Liberal	Donald Mackinnon	10,980	41.7	−5.7
Democrats	Reginald Jones	1,851	7.0	−5.4
Independent	Peter Allan	1,259	4.8	+4.8
Total formal votes		26,304	98.1	+0.3
Informal votes		510	1.9	−0.3
Turnout		26,814	94.4	+1.6
Two-party-preferred result
Labor	Margaret Ray	14,082	53.5	+7.1
Liberal	Donald Mackinnon	12,222	46.5	−7.1
Labor gain from Liberal		Swing	+7.1	

=== Brighton ===
1982 Victorian state election: Brighton
Party	Candidate	Votes	%	±%
Liberal	Jeannette Patrick	13,807	57.8	−4.9
Labor	Garry Moore	7,804	32.7	−4.6
Democrats	George Dart	2,263	9.5	+9.5
Total formal votes		23,874	98.3	+0.7
Informal votes		418	1.7	−0.7
Turnout		24,292	93.6	+2.2
Two-party-preferred result
Liberal	Jeannette Patrick	14,769	61.9	−0.8
Labor	Garry Moore	9,108	38.1	+0.8
Liberal hold		Swing	−0.8	

=== Broadmeadows ===
1982 Victorian state election: Broadmeadows
Party	Candidate	Votes	%	±%
Labor	John Wilton	26,065	74.5	+6.1
Democrats	Barbara Duncan	4,496	12.9	−1.6
Liberal	Ross Owen	4,438	12.7	−4.4
Total formal votes		34,999	94.4	+0.4
Informal votes		2,093	5.6	−0.4
Turnout		37,092	94.9	+1.5
Two-party-preferred result
Labor	John Wilton	28,650	81.9	+6.3
Liberal	Ross Owen	6,349	18.1	−6.3
Labor hold		Swing	+6.3	

- The two candidate preferred vote was not counted between the Labor and Democrat candidates for Broadmeadows.

=== Brunswick ===
1982 Victorian state election: Brunswick
Party	Candidate	Votes	%	±%
Labor	Tom Roper	19,092	75.7	+5.5
Liberal	Brian Tuohy	4,673	18.5	−4.9
Australia	David Anderson	1,014	4.0	+4.0
Independent	James Ferrari	430	1.7	+1.7
Total formal votes		25,209	95.7	+0.1
Informal votes		1,135	4.3	−0.1
Turnout		26,344	90.7	+0.9
Two-party-preferred result
Labor	Tom Roper	19,890	78.9	+3.4
Liberal	Brian Tuohy	5,319	21.1	−3.4
Labor hold		Swing	+3.4	

=== Bundoora ===
1982 Victorian state election: Bundoora
Party	Candidate	Votes	%	±%
Labor	John Cain	19,894	64.2	+4.6
Liberal	Peter Clarke	9,789	31.6	−5.3
Democrats	Peter Shaw	1,297	4.2	+4.2
Total formal votes		30,980	97.5	+0.4
Informal votes		777	2.5	−0.4
Turnout		31,757	94.6	+0.2
Two-party-preferred result
Labor	John Cain	20,623	66.6	+6.0
Liberal	Peter Clarke	10,357	33.4	−6.0
Labor hold		Swing	+6.0	

=== Burwood ===
1982 Victorian state election: Burwood
Party	Candidate	Votes	%	±%
Liberal	Jeff Kennett	12,809	52.6	−1.6
Labor	Paul Trewern	9,269	38.1	+2.5
Democrats	Harold Jeffrey	2,278	9.4	−0.8
Total formal votes		24,356	98.4	+0.1
Informal votes		388	1.6	−0.1
Turnout		24,744	94.1	+1.2
Two-party-preferred result
Liberal	Jeff Kennett	13,777	56.6	−2.5
Labor	Paul Trewern	10,579	43.4	+2.5
Liberal hold		Swing	−2.5	

=== Carrum ===
1982 Victorian state election: Carrum
Party	Candidate	Votes	%	±%
Labor	Ian Cathie	17,786	62.7	+7.2
Liberal	Derek Bunyan	9,599	33.8	−1.3
Democrats	William Towers	999	3.5	−5.0
Total formal votes		28,384	97.0	−0.3
Informal votes		837	3.0	+0.3
Turnout		29,221	93.2	0.0
Two-party-preferred result
Labor	Ian Cathie	18,360	64.7	+2.8
Liberal	Derek Bunyan	10,024	35.3	−2.8
Labor hold		Swing	+2.8	

=== Caulfield ===
1982 Victorian state election: Caulfield
Party	Candidate	Votes	%	±%
Liberal	Ted Tanner	12,909	53.5	+13.3
Labor	Jack Diamond	9,221	38.2	+7.6
Democrats	Beverley Broadbent	2,017	8.4	−2.2
Total formal votes		24,147	97.3	+0.6
Informal votes		640	2.7	−0.6
Turnout		24,787	91.9	+2.1
Two-party-preferred result
Liberal	Ted Tanner	13,766	57.0	+3.2
Labor	Jack Diamond	10,381	43.0	−3.2
Liberal hold		Swing	+3.2	

=== Coburg ===
1982 Victorian state election: Coburg
Party	Candidate	Votes	%	±%
Labor	Peter Gavin	18,656	70.2	+24.5
Liberal	Bozidar Jovanovic	5,464	20.5	+2.5
Independent	Ernest Hadley	2,476	9.3	+9.3
Total formal votes		26,596	96.1	+2.5
Informal votes		1,067	3.9	−2.5
Turnout		27,663	94.3	−0.5
Two-party-preferred result
Labor	Peter Gavin	19,894	74.8	+5.3
Liberal	Bozidar Jovanovic	6,702	25.2	−5.3
Labor hold		Swing	+5.3	

=== Dandenong ===
1982 Victorian state election: Dandenong
Party	Candidate	Votes	%	±%
Labor	Rob Jolly	23,360	65.3	+14.2
Liberal	Mario Dodic	12,406	34.7	−3.5
Total formal votes		35,766	95.9	−0.4
Informal votes		1,530	4.1	+0.4
Turnout		37,296	94.2	0.0
Labor hold		Swing	+8.8	

=== Doncaster ===
1982 Victorian state election: Doncaster
Party	Candidate	Votes	%	±%
Liberal	Morris Williams	16,026	51.9	−2.2
Labor	Peter Cleeland	12,242	39.7	+5.6
Democrats	Lynden Kenyon	2,594	8.4	−2.8
Total formal votes		30,862	98.0	+0.2
Informal votes		643	2.0	−0.2
Turnout		31,505	95.4	+0.7
Two-party-preferred result
Liberal	Morris Williams	17,128	55.5	−5.4
Labor	Peter Cleeland	13,734	44.5	+5.4
Liberal hold		Swing	−5.4	

=== Dromana ===
1982 Victorian state election: Dromana
Party	Candidate	Votes	%	±%
Liberal	Ron Wells	13,977	43.5	−5.0
Labor	David Hassett	13,788	42.9	+4.9
Democrats	Maurice Freeman	1,860	5.8	−1.3
Independent	Ian Bendle	1,463	4.6	+4.6
Independent	Kenneth Payne	1,026	3.2	+3.2
Total formal votes		32,114	97.7	+0.1
Informal votes		743	2.3	−0.1
Turnout		32,857	92.5	+0.2
Two-party-preferred result
Labor	David Hassett	16,380	51.0	+7.7
Liberal	Ron Wells	15,734	49.0	−7.7
Labor gain from Liberal		Swing	+7.7	

=== Essendon ===
1982 Victorian state election: Essendon
Party	Candidate	Votes	%	±%
Labor	Barry Rowe	14,396	57.3	+6.5
Liberal	Graeme Goodson	9,770	38.9	−2.5
Democrats	Alan Powell	780	3.1	+3.1
Australia	Richard Wright	176	0.7	+0.7
Total formal votes		25,122	97.2	−0.1
Informal votes		719	2.8	+0.1
Turnout		25,841	95.1	+0.7
Two-party-preferred result
Labor	Barry Rowe	14,932	59.4	+7.9
Liberal	Graeme Goodson	10,190	40.6	−7.9
Labor hold		Swing	+7.9	

=== Evelyn ===
1982 Victorian state election: Evelyn
Party	Candidate	Votes	%	±%
Labor	Max McDonald	16,858	49.0	+6.6
Liberal	Jim Plowman	14,224	41.4	−6.0
Democrats	Bruce McFarlane	2,264	6.6	−3.7
Independent	Peter Gompertz	1,042	3.0	+3.0
Total formal votes		34,388	98.0	+0.6
Informal votes		710	2.0	−0.6
Turnout		35,098	93.3	+0.5
Two-party-preferred result
Labor	Max McDonald	16,858	54.3	+8.1
Liberal	Jim Plowman	15,732	45.7	−8.1
Labor gain from Liberal		Swing	+8.1	

=== Footscray ===
1982 Victorian state election: Footscray
Party	Candidate	Votes	%	±%
Labor	Robert Fordham	19,018	76.3	+6.8
Liberal	John Huntington	5,915	23.7	−1.4
Total formal votes		24,933	94.8	+0.5
Informal votes		1,372	5.2	−0.5
Turnout		26,305	93.4	+0.9
Labor hold		Swing	+2.0	

=== Forest Hill ===
1982 Victorian state election: Forest Hill
Party	Candidate	Votes	%	±%
Liberal	John Richardson	14,816	46.9	−3.4
Labor	Anne Blackburn	14,286	45.2	+5.7
Democrats	Ross Larson	2,476	7.8	−1.9
Total formal votes		31,578	98.2	+0.2
Informal votes		581	1.8	−0.2
Turnout		32,159	95.2	+0.8
Two-party-preferred result
Liberal	John Richardson	15,842	50.2	−4.8
Labor	Anne Blackburn	15,736	49.8	+4.8
Liberal hold		Swing	−4.8	

=== Frankston ===
1982 Victorian state election: Frankston
Party	Candidate	Votes	%	±%
Liberal	Graeme Weideman	15,268	46.3	−5.8
Labor	Jane Hill	14,478	43.9	+4.8
Democrats	Laurence Amor	3,204	9.7	+0.9
Total formal votes		32,950	98.1	+0.2
Informal votes		640	1.9	−0.2
Turnout		33,590	93.6	+0.1
Two-party-preferred result
Labor	Jane Hill	16,513	50.1	+7.3
Liberal	Graeme Weideman	16,437	49.9	−7.3
Labor gain from Liberal		Swing	+7.3	

=== Geelong East ===
1982 Victorian state election: Geelong East
Party	Candidate	Votes	%	±%
Labor	Graham Ernst	13,726	53.6	+5.9
Liberal	Raymond Carey	9,977	39.0	−5.6
Democrats	Robert Mann	1,059	4.1	−0.6
Democratic Labor	James Jordan	855	3.3	+0.2
Total formal votes		25,617	97.9	0.0
Informal votes		561	2.1	0.0
Turnout		26,178	94.0	−0.5
Two-party-preferred result
Labor	Graham Ernst	14,421	56.3	+4.6
Liberal	Raymond Carey	11,196	43.7	−4.6
Labor hold		Swing	+4.6	

=== Geelong North ===
1982 Victorian state election: Geelong North
Party	Candidate	Votes	%	±%
Labor	Neil Trezise	18,831	68.1	+2.9
Liberal	Gregory Arrowsmith	8,808	31.9	−2.9
Total formal votes		27,639	96.1	+0.2
Informal votes		1,117	3.9	−0.2
Turnout		28,756	94.8	+0.9
Labor hold		Swing	+2.9	

=== Geelong West ===
1982 Victorian state election: Geelong West
Party	Candidate	Votes	%	±%
Labor	Hayden Shell	11,814	49.6	+4.5
Liberal	Michael Henderson	10,367	43.5	−5.4
Democrats	Penelope Collet	1,662	7.0	+1.0
Total formal votes		23,843	98.1	+0.4
Informal votes		464	1.9	−0.4
Turnout		24,307	94.2	+0.4
Two-party-preferred result
Labor	Hayden Shell	12,610	52.9	+3.7
Liberal	Michael Henderson	11,233	47.1	−3.7
Labor gain from Liberal		Swing	+3.7	

=== Gippsland East ===
1982 Victorian state election: Gippsland East
Party	Candidate	Votes	%	±%
National	Bruce Evans	11,202	43.6	+2.3
Labor	Dan Luscombe	8,370	32.6	+1.4
Liberal	John Riggall	5,029	19.6	−7.9
Democrats	Ian Glover	1,069	4.2	+4.2
Total formal votes		25,670	97.7	+1.1
Informal votes		612	2.3	−1.1
Turnout		26,282	92.9	+0.2
Two-party-preferred result
National	Bruce Evans	16,446	64.1	−3.2
Labor	Dan Luscombe	9,224	35.9	+3.2
National hold		Swing	−3.2	

=== Gippsland South ===
1982 Victorian state election: Gippsland South
Party	Candidate	Votes	%	±%
Liberal	Neil McInnes	9,269	36.0	−1.4
National	Tom Wallace	8,224	32.0	+1.7
Labor	Reginald Smith	6,734	26.2	+2.7
Democrats	Wilma Western	1,492	5.8	−3.0
Total formal votes		25,719	98.2	+0.9
Informal votes		462	1.8	−0.9
Turnout		26,181	93.8	+0.9
Two-party-preferred result
National	Tom Wallace	17,836	69.3	+2.2
Labor	Reginald Smith	7,883	30.7	−2.2
Two-candidate-preferred result
National	Tom Wallace	15,068	58.6	+1.7
Liberal	Neil McInnes	10,651	41.4	−1.7
National hold		Swing	+1.7	

=== Gisborne ===
1982 Victorian state election: Gisborne
Party	Candidate	Votes	%	±%
Liberal	Tom Reynolds	16,473	49.1	−2.9
Labor	Philip Coman	15,921	47.4	−0.6
Independent	Kottarammukallel Sebastian	1,189	3.5	+3.5
Total formal votes		33,583	98.4	+1.0
Informal votes		548	1.6	−1.0
Turnout		34,131	94.5	+0.3
Two-party-preferred result
Liberal	Tom Reynolds	17,092	50.9	−1.1
Labor	Philip Coman	16,491	49.1	+1.1
Liberal hold		Swing	−1.1	

=== Glenhuntly ===
1982 Victorian state election: Glenhuntly
Party	Candidate	Votes	%	±%
Labor	Gerard Vaughan	12,304	50.4	+4.3
Liberal	Peter Norman	10,326	42.3	−2.4
Democrats	Fred Ingamells	1,766	7.2	+7.2
Total formal votes		24,396	97.6	+0.6
Informal votes		590	2.4	−0.6
Turnout		24,986	93.1	0.0
Two-party-preferred result
Labor	Gerard Vaughan	13,319	54.6	+3.0
Liberal	Peter Norman	11,077	45.4	−3.0
Labor hold		Swing	+3.0	

=== Glenroy ===
1982 Victorian state election: Glenroy
Party	Candidate	Votes	%	±%
Labor	Jack Culpin	18,118	71.2	+4.5
Liberal	Donald Roberts	7,314	28.8	−4.5
Total formal votes		24,363	95.8	−0.3
Informal votes		1,027	3.9	+0.3
Turnout		25,432	90.7	−3.7
Labor hold		Swing	+4.5	

=== Greensborough ===
1982 Victorian state election: Greensborough
Party	Candidate	Votes	%	±%
Labor	Pauline Toner	19,688	53.6	+5.5
Liberal	John Dobinson	13,667	37.2	−3.6
Democrats	Antony Siddons	3,373	9.2	−1.4
Total formal votes		36,728	98.6	+0.2
Informal votes		526	1.4	−0.2
Turnout		37,254	95.3	+2.4
Two-party-preferred result
Labor	Pauline Toner	21,627	58.9	+5.0
Liberal	John Dobinson	15,101	41.1	−5.0
Labor hold		Swing	+5.0	

=== Hawthorn ===
1982 Victorian state election: Hawthorn
Party	Candidate	Votes	%	±%
Liberal	Walter Jona	11,509	50.0	−4.7
Labor	Jennifer Eastwood	9,889	42.9	+6.3
Democrats	Mark Harris	1,638	7.1	−1.6
Total formal votes		23,036	98.0	+0.4
Informal votes		461	2.0	−0.4
Turnout		23,497	90.9	+1.6
Two-party-preferred result
Liberal	Walter Jona	12,118	52.6	−7.2
Labor	Jennifer Eastwood	10,918	47.4	+7.2
Liberal hold		Swing	−7.2	

=== Heatherton ===
1982 Victorian state election: Heatherton
Party	Candidate	Votes	%	±%
Labor	Peter Spyker	16,746	55.3	+9.2
Liberal	Geoff Leigh	10,924	36.1	−6.3
Democrats	Michael Johnson	2,619	8.7	−2.8
Total formal votes		30,289	97.1	+0.6
Informal votes		902	2.9	−0.6
Turnout		31,191	95.3	+1.6
Two-party-preferred result
Labor	Peter Spyker	18,252	60.3	+9.3
Liberal	Geoff Leigh	12,037	39.7	−9.3
Labor hold		Swing	+9.3	

=== Ivanhoe ===
1982 Victorian state election: Ivanhoe
Party	Candidate	Votes	%	±%
Labor	Tony Sheehan	13,492	47.2	+6.8
Liberal	Bruce Skeggs	13,426	47.0	−1.3
Democrats	Harold Shepherd	1,677	5.9	−5.4
Total formal votes		28,595	98.1	+0.5
Informal votes		561	1.9	−0.5
Turnout		29,156	94.5	+0.6
Two-party-preferred result
Labor	Tony Sheehan	14,449	50.5	+3.9
Liberal	Bruce Skeggs	14,144	49.5	−3.9
Labor gain from Liberal		Swing	+3.9	

=== Keilor ===
1982 Victorian state election: Keilor
Party	Candidate	Votes	%	±%
Labor	Jack Ginifer	27,955	72.1	+6.9
Liberal	Graham Robertson	10,822	27.9	−6.9
Total formal votes		38,777	94.3	+0.3
Informal votes		2,345	5.7	−0.3
Turnout		41,122	94.9	+0.7
Labor hold		Swing	+6.9	

=== Kew ===
1982 Victorian state election: Kew
Party	Candidate	Votes	%	±%
Liberal	Prue Sibree	14,123	55.8	+1.4
Labor	George Theodoridis	8,615	34.0	+2.7
Democrats	Veronica Lysaght	2,569	10.2	+2.9
Total formal votes		25,307	98.1	+0.4
Informal votes		499	1.9	−0.4
Turnout		25,806	92.7	+1.5
Two-party-preferred result
Liberal	Prue Sibree	15,215	60.1	−1.1
Labor	George Theodoridis	10,092	39.9	+1.1
Liberal hold		Swing	−1.1	

=== Knox ===
1982 Victorian state election: Knox
Party	Candidate	Votes	%	±%
Labor	Steve Crabb	18,071	57.2	+1.1
Liberal	Peter Evans	11,272	35.7	−5.1
Democrats	Dennis Ryan	2,237	7.1	+7.1
Total formal votes		31,580	98.1	+0.4
Informal votes		621	1.9	−0.4
Turnout		32,201	95.3	+0.3
Two-party-preferred result
Labor	Steve Crabb	19,357	61.3	+2.9
Liberal	Peter Evans	12,223	38.7	−2.9
Labor hold		Swing	+2.9	

=== Lowan ===
1982 Victorian state election: Lowan
Party	Candidate	Votes	%	±%
National	Bill McGrath	12,508	52.2	+20.4
Liberal	Robert Kosch	5,701	23.8	−20.8
Labor	David Drake-Feary	5,354	22.3	−1.3
Democrats	Zelma Furey	402	1.7	+1.7
Total formal votes		23,965	98.5	0.0
Informal votes		352	1.5	0.0
Turnout		24,317	95.1	−0.1
Two-party-preferred result
National	Bill McGrath	18,095	75.5	+4.0
Labor	David Drake-Feary	5,870	24.5	−4.0
National hold		Swing	+4.0	

- The two candidate preferred vote was not counted between the National and Liberal candidates for Lowan.

=== Malvern ===
1982 Victorian state election: Malvern
Party	Candidate	Votes	%	±%
Liberal	Lindsay Thompson	14,980	60.8	+1.0
Labor	Kenneth Penaluna	8,068	32.7	0.0
Democrats	Brian Stockton	1,259	5.1	+5.1
Independent	Joseph McCarthy	333	1.4	+1.4
Total formal votes		24,640	98.2	+0.4
Informal votes		455	1.8	−0.4
Turnout		25,095	92.4	−2.2
Two-party-preferred result
Liberal	Lindsay Thompson	15,682	63.6	−1.4
Labor	Kenneth Penaluna	8,958	36.4	+1.4
Liberal hold		Swing	−1.4	

=== Melbourne ===
1982 Victorian state election: Melbourne
Party	Candidate	Votes	%	±%
Labor	Keith Remington	12,819	62.9	+4.1
Liberal	John Simmonds	5,102	25.0	−4.1
Democrats	Catherine Stewart	1,350	6.6	−2.0
Independent	Cecil Murgatroyd	626	3.1	+3.1
Communist	Roger Wilson	479	2.4	−1.1
Total formal votes		20,376	95.7	+1.4
Informal votes		911	4.3	−1.4
Turnout		21,287	90.0	+3.9
Two-party-preferred result
Labor	Keith Remington	14,147	69.4	+3.4
Liberal	John Simmonds	6,229	30.6	−3.4
Labor hold		Swing	+3.4	

=== Mentone ===
1982 Victorian state election: Mentone
Party	Candidate	Votes	%	±%
Liberal	Bill Templeton	13,480	51.2	−0.2
Labor	David Tindal	12,855	48.8	+6.2
Total formal votes		26,335	97.9	+0.1
Informal votes		557	2.1	−0.1
Turnout		26,892	94.1	+1.1
Liberal hold		Swing	−5.3	

=== Midlands ===
1982 Victorian state election: Midlands
Party	Candidate	Votes	%	±%
Labor	Alan Calder	11,894	44.9	+4.0
Liberal	Bill Ebery	10,997	41.5	−7.6
National	Ian Richardson	2,172	8.2	+8.2
Democrats	George Hunter	1,421	5.4	−4.6
Total formal votes		26,484	98.2	−0.2
Informal votes		477	1.8	+0.2
Turnout		26,961	94.9	+0.8
Two-party-preferred result
Liberal	Bill Ebery	13,582	51.3	−3.7
Labor	Alan Calder	12,902	48.7	+3.7
Liberal hold		Swing	−3.7	

=== Mildura ===
1982 Victorian state election: Mildura
Party	Candidate	Votes	%	±%
National	Milton Whiting	13,097	54.0	−2.1
Labor	Lindsay Leake	7,233	29.8	+4.3
Liberal	Ron Wilson	2,714	11.2	−7.2
Democrats	Donald Wilson	1,225	5.1	+5.1
Total formal votes		24,269	97.4	+0.9
Informal votes		635	2.6	−0.9
Turnout		24,904	93.0	−1.1
Two-party-preferred result
National	Milton Whiting	16,197	66.7	−5.6
Labor	Lindsay Leake	8,072	33.3	+5.6
National hold		Swing	−5.6	

=== Mitcham ===
1982 Victorian state election: Mitcham
Party	Candidate	Votes	%	±%
Labor	John Harrowfield	13,581	50.0	+5.7
Liberal	George Cox	11,075	40.8	−3.5
Democrats	Ross Roberts	1,702	6.3	−2.1
Democratic Labor	Ada Kowal	785	2.9	+2.9
Total formal votes		27,143	97.9	+0.1
Informal votes		573	2.1	−0.1
Turnout		27,716	95.3	+0.8
Two-party-preferred result
Labor	John Harrowfield	14,638	53.9	+4.6
Liberal	George Cox	12,505	46.1	−4.6
Labor gain from Liberal		Swing	+4.6	

=== Monbulk ===
1982 Victorian state election: Monbulk
Party	Candidate	Votes	%	±%
Labor	Neil Pope	12,477	41.8	0.0
Liberal	Bill Borthwick	11,727	39.3	−7.0
Independent	Bert Wainer	2,892	9.7	+9.7
Democrats	Milton Blake	2,001	6.7	−4.1
Independent	Jean Langworthy	737	2.5	+2.5
Total formal votes		29,834	97.5	0.0
Informal votes		748	2.5	0.0
Turnout		30,582	93.4	+1.0
Two-party-preferred result
Labor	Neil Pope	15,809	53.0	+5.2
Liberal	Bill Borthwick	14,025	47.0	−5.2
Labor gain from Liberal		Swing	+5.2	

=== Morwell ===
1982 Victorian state election: Morwell
Party	Candidate	Votes	%	±%
Labor	Valerie Callister	16,045	60.6	−0.2
Liberal	David Little	6,382	24.1	−1.3
National	Gordon Robertson	2,347	8.9	+1.5
Democrats	Ross Ollquist	1,713	6.5	+1.5
Total formal votes		26,487	97.8	+0.6
Informal votes		592	2.2	−0.6
Turnout		27,079	94.5	+0.3
Two-party-preferred result
Labor	Valerie Callister	17,265	65.2	−1.4
Liberal	David Little	9,222	34.8	+1.4
Labor hold		Swing	−1.4	

=== Murray Valley ===
1982 Victorian state election: Murray Valley
Party	Candidate	Votes	%	±%
National	Ken Jasper	14,347	56.7	+6.9
Labor	Jill Millthorpe	7,685	30.4	+2.0
Liberal	William Scott	3,278	13.0	−8.9
Total formal votes		25,310	98.0	+1.6
Informal votes		512	2.0	−1.6
Turnout		25,822	95.0	+0.4
Two-party-preferred result
National	Ken Jasper	17,462	69.0	−1.5
Labor	Jill Millthorpe	7,848	31.0	+1.5
National hold		Swing	−1.5	

=== Narracan ===
1982 Victorian state election: Narracan
Party	Candidate	Votes	%	±%
Labor	Richard Gubbins	11,909	44.4	+2.0
Liberal	John Delzoppo	10,503	39.2	−4.6
National	Douglas Hatfield	2,427	9.1	+0.1
Democratic Labor	Brian Handley	1,070	4.0	+4.0
Democrats	Nancye Yeates	922	3.4	−1.5
Total formal votes		26,831	97.7	−0.3
Informal votes		640	2.3	+0.3
Turnout		27,471	94.6	+0.2
Two-party-preferred result
Liberal	John Delzoppo	13,886	51.7	−3.4
Labor	Richard Gubbins	12,945	48.3	+3.4
Liberal hold		Swing	−3.4	

=== Niddrie ===
1982 Victorian state election: Niddrie
Party	Candidate	Votes	%	±%
Labor	Jack Simpson	17,395	61.6	+6.8
Liberal	Brian Dodgson	8,234	29.2	−4.2
Democrats	Frank Trifiletti	2,613	9.3	+3.8
Total formal votes		28,242	96.1	−0.1
Informal votes		1,146	3.9	+0.1
Turnout		29,388	95.9	+0.2
Two-party-preferred result
Labor	Jack Simpson	18,897	66.9	+7.2
Liberal	Brian Dodgson	9,345	33.1	−7.2
Labor hold		Swing	+7.2	

=== Noble Park ===
1982 Victorian state election: Noble Park
Party	Candidate	Votes	%	±%
Labor	Terry Norris	17,833	53.3	+4.3
Liberal	Peter Collins	14,017	41.9	−9.1
Democrats	Geoffrey Earl	1,581	4.7	+4.7
Total formal votes		33,431	97.0	+1.1
Informal votes		1,025	3.0	−1.1
Turnout		34,456	94.9	+0.5
Two-party-preferred result
Labor	Terry Norris	18,742	56.1	+7.1
Liberal	Peter Collins	14,689	43.9	−7.1
Labor gain from Liberal		Swing	+7.1	

=== Northcote ===
1982 Victorian state election: Northcote
Party	Candidate	Votes	%	±%
Labor	Frank Wilkes	19,113	73.5	+3.3
Liberal	Gerard Clarke	6,898	26.5	−0.2
Total formal votes		26,011	95.5	−0.4
Informal votes		1,217	4.5	+0.4
Turnout		27,228	92.6	+1.9
Labor hold		Swing	+1.6	

=== Oakleigh ===
1982 Victorian state election: Oakleigh
Party	Candidate	Votes	%	±%
Labor	Race Mathews	13,801	52.9	+6.6
Liberal	Francis Callaghan	10,227	39.2	−2.0
Democrats	Malcolm Haddrick	1,219	4.7	−2.7
Democratic Labor	John Mulholland	833	3.2	−0.3
Total formal votes		26,080	98.0	+1.0
Informal votes		522	2.0	−1.0
Turnout		26,602	94.5	+1.2
Two-party-preferred result
Labor	Race Mathews	14,585	55.9	+4.2
Liberal	Francis Callaghan	11,495	44.1	−4.2
Labor hold		Swing	+4.2	

=== Polwarth ===
1982 Victorian state election: Polwarth
Party	Candidate	Votes	%	±%
Liberal	Cec Burgin	15,241	63.1	+9.3
Labor	Angus McIvor	6,734	27.9	+2.2
Democrats	Douglas Mason	2,183	9.0	+3.7
Total formal votes		24,158	98.6	+0.5
Informal votes		350	1.4	−0.5
Turnout		24,508	95.8	−0.2
Two-party-preferred result
Liberal	Cec Burgin	16,169	66.9	−1.8
Labor	Angus McIvor	7,989	33.1	+1.8
Liberal hold		Swing	−1.8	

=== Portland ===
1982 Victorian state election: Portland
Party	Candidate	Votes	%	±%
Liberal	Don McKellar	13,903	55.5	+13.0
Labor	William Sharrock	9,606	38.4	+4.7
Independent	David Wilson	1,523	6.1	+6.1
Total formal votes		25,032	98.8	+0.2
Informal votes		315	1.2	−0.2
Turnout		25,347	95.6	+0.2
Two-party-preferred result
Liberal	Don McKellar	14,714	58.8	+0.8
Labor	William Sharrock	10,318	41.2	−0.8
Liberal hold		Swing	+0.8	

=== Prahran ===
1982 Victorian state election: Prahran
Party	Candidate	Votes	%	±%
Labor	Bob Miller	11,241	50.6	+4.5
Liberal	Peter Thomson	9,746	43.9	+0.3
Democrats	Pamela Hoobin	1,038	4.7	−4.3
Socialist	Trevor McCandless	195	0.9	+0.9
Total formal votes		22,220	97.6	+0.9
Informal votes		546	2.4	−0.9
Turnout		22,766	89.1	+0.9
Two-party-preferred result
Labor	Bob Miller	11,935	53.7	+2.8
Liberal	Peter Thomson	10,285	46.3	−2.8
Labor hold		Swing	+2.8	

=== Preston ===
1982 Victorian state election: Preston
Party	Candidate	Votes	%	±%
Labor	Carl Kirkwood	17,544	74.5	+3.0
Democrats	Kenneth Peak	6,015	25.5	+25.5
Total formal votes		23,559	94.6	−0.8
Informal votes		1,338	5.4	+0.8
Turnout		24,897	93.1	+1.3
Labor hold		Swing	+3.0	

=== Reservoir ===
1982 Victorian state election: Reservoir
Party	Candidate	Votes	%	±%
Labor	Jim Simmonds	19,387	71.6	+4.2
Liberal	Rodney Blackwood	7,695	28.4	+1.7
Total formal votes		27,082	95.1	−0.5
Informal votes		1,391	4.9	+0.5
Turnout		28,473	94.9	+1.2
Labor hold		Swing	+0.6	

=== Richmond ===
1982 Victorian state election: Richmond
Party	Candidate	Votes	%	±%
Labor	Theo Sidiropoulos	16,680	69.3	+4.5
Liberal	Jordan Topalides	4,473	18.6	−2.3
Democrats	Bruce Errol	2,915	12.1	−0.4
Total formal votes		24,068	95.9	+1.3
Informal votes		1,034	4.1	−1.3
Turnout		25,102	87.8	+0.4
Two-party-preferred result
Labor	Theo Sidiropoulos	18,354	76.3	+5.9
Liberal	Jordan Topalides	5,714	23.7	−5.9
Labor hold		Swing	+5.9	

=== Ringwood ===
1982 Victorian state election: Ringwood
Party	Candidate	Votes	%	±%
Labor	Kay Setches	13,659	46.3	+5.4
Liberal	Peter McArthur	12,123	41.1	−6.7
Democrats	Michael Nardella	2,091	7.1	−3.1
Independent	Robin Gardini	694	2.4	+2.4
Democratic Labor	John Garratt	655	2.2	+2.2
Independent	Wilfrid Thiele	271	0.9	+0.9
Total formal votes		29,493	97.8	+0.2
Informal votes		669	2.2	−0.2
Turnout		30,162	94.5	+0.4
Two-party-preferred result
Labor	Kay Setches	15,360	52.1	+6.2
Liberal	Peter McArthur	14,133	47.9	−6.2
Labor gain from Liberal		Swing	+6.2	

=== Ripon ===
1982 Victorian state election: Ripon
Party	Candidate	Votes	%	±%
Liberal	Tom Austin	13,974	54.7	+7.8
Labor	Ian Bryant	11,553	45.3	+2.7
Total formal votes		25,527	98.1	−0.1
Informal votes		485	1.9	+0.1
Turnout		26,012	95.2	−0.2
Liberal hold		Swing	−0.5	

=== Rodney ===
1982 Victorian state election: Rodney
Party	Candidate	Votes	%	±%
National	Eddie Hann	15,525	60.4	+1.8
Labor	Gregory Leeder	5,109	19.9	+3.1
Liberal	Clive Pilley	4,004	15.6	−1.4
Democrats	Douglas Linford	1,087	4.2	−3.4
Total formal votes		25,725	98.5	+0.9
Informal votes		395	1.5	−0.9
Turnout		16,120	95.5	+0.2
Two-party-preferred result
National	Eddie Hann	19,791	76.9	−1.5
Labor	Gregory Leeder	5,934	23.1	+1.5
National hold		Swing	−1.5	

=== St Kilda ===
1982 Victorian state election: St Kilda
Party	Candidate	Votes	%	±%
Labor	Andrew McCutcheon	11,701	50.9	+6.6
Liberal	Brian Dixon	9,406	40.9	−4.0
Democrats	Susanne McDougall	1,022	4.5	−1.4
Democratic Labor	Daniel Condon	703	3.1	−1.9
Australia	Joseph Johnson	143	0.6	+0.6
Total formal votes		22,975	95.9	+0.5
Informal votes		993	4.1	−0.5
Turnout		23,968	90.1	+2.6
Two-party-preferred result
Labor	Andrew McCutcheon	12,431	54.1	+4.3
Liberal	Brian Dixon	10,544	45.9	−4.3
Labor gain from Liberal		Swing	+4.3	

=== Sandringham ===
1982 Victorian state election: Sandringham
Party	Candidate	Votes	%	±%
Labor	Graham Ihlein	11,978	46.9	+4.5
Liberal	Max Crellin	11,354	44.5	−0.8
Democrats	Nathan Crafti	2,213	8.7	−3.5
Total formal votes		25,545	98.4	+0.3
Informal votes		421	1.6	−0.3
Turnout		25,966	94.5	+1.2
Two-party-preferred result
Labor	Graham Ihlein	13,169	51.5	+3.3
Liberal	Max Crellin	12,376	48.5	−3.3
Labor gain from Liberal		Swing	+3.3	

=== Shepparton ===
1982 Victorian state election: Shepparton
Party	Candidate	Votes	%	±%
National	Peter Ross-Edwards	13,021	48.2	−1.8
Labor	Marjorie Gillies	7,994	29.6	+2.9
Liberal	Bill Hunter	5,979	22.2	−1.1
Total formal votes		26,994	97.7	+1.6
Informal votes		635	2.3	−1.6
Turnout		27,629	95.0	−0.6
Two-party-preferred result
National	Peter Ross-Edwards	18,429	68.3	−2.5
Labor	Marjorie Gillies	8,565	31.7	+2.5
National hold		Swing	−2.5	

=== South Barwon ===
1982 Victorian state election: South Barwon
Party	Candidate	Votes	%	±%
Liberal	Harley Dickinson	14,536	49.2	−7.4
Labor	Eric Young	12,997	44.0	+0.6
Democrats	Kenneth Oliver	2,016	6.8	+6.8
Total formal votes		29,549	98.5	+0.6
Informal votes		452	1.5	−0.6
Turnout		30,001	94.3	−0.8
Two-party-preferred result
Liberal	Harley Dickinson	14,680	51.1	−5.5
Labor	Eric Young	14,055	48.9	+5.5
Liberal hold		Swing	−5.5	

=== Springvale ===
1982 Victorian state election: Springvale
Party	Candidate	Votes	%	±%
Labor	Kevin King	15,798	53.5	+7.1
Liberal	Graeme Duggan	11,228	38.1	−4.7
Democrats	Morag Thorne	1,601	5.4	−2.3
Democratic Labor	Elaine Mulholland	885	3.0	+3.0
Total formal votes		29,512	96.9	+0.7
Informal votes		948	3.1	−0.7
Turnout		30,460	94.4	+0.1
Two-party-preferred result
Labor	Kevin King	16,808	56.9	+6.2
Liberal	Graeme Duggan	12,704	43.1	−6.2
Labor hold		Swing	+6.2	

=== Sunshine ===
1982 Victorian state election: Sunshine
Party	Candidate	Votes	%	±%
Labor	Bill Fogarty	19,848	72.7	+0.6
Liberal	Mario De Bono	6,113	22.4	−0.9
Democrats	Algimantas Kacinskas	1,351	5.0	+0.4
Total formal votes		27,312	94.9	+0.6
Informal votes		1,474	5.1	−0.6
Turnout		28,786	94.8	0.0
Two-party-preferred result
Labor	Bill Fogarty	20,625	75.5	+1.0
Liberal	Mario De Bono	6,687	24.5	−1.0
Labor hold		Swing	+1.0	

=== Swan Hill ===
1982 Victorian state election: Swan Hill
Party	Candidate	Votes	%	±%
Liberal	Alan Wood	14,493	58.7	−0.3
Labor	Ian Hardie	4,748	19.2	+1.5
National	David Shannon	4,611	18.7	−4.7
Democrats	John Greig	858	3.5	+3.5
Total formal votes		24,710	98.3	−0.1
Informal votes		414	1.7	+0.1
Turnout		25,124	94.6	−0.9
Two-party-preferred result
Liberal	Alan Wood	19,024	77.0	+2.2
Labor	Ian Hardie	5,686	23.0	−2.2
Liberal hold		Swing	+2.2	

=== Syndal ===
1982 Victorian state election: Syndal
Party	Candidate	Votes	%	±%
Labor	David Gray	13,567	49.3	+4.4
Liberal	Geoff Coleman	11,153	40.5	−5.9
Democrats	Fraser Hercus	1,802	6.6	−2.1
Democratic Labor	Paul Carroll	1,008	3.7	+3.7
Total formal votes		27,530	97.8	+1.0
Informal votes		608	2.2	−1.0
Turnout		28,138	94.6	+0.6
Two-party-preferred result
Labor	David Gray	14,826	53.8	+4.5
Liberal	Geoff Coleman	12,704	46.2	−4.5
Labor gain from Liberal		Swing	+4.5	

=== Wantirna ===
1982 Victorian state election: Wantirna
Party	Candidate	Votes	%	±%
Liberal	Don Saltmarsh	18,899	46.5	−5.9
Labor	Carolyn Hirsh	17,922	44.1	+8.5
Democrats	Colin Styring	3,783	9.3	−1.3
Total formal votes		40,604	98.3	+0.4
Informal votes		698	1.7	−0.4
Turnout		41,302	94.7	+0.7
Two-party-preferred result
Liberal	Don Saltmarsh	20,653	50.8	−6.8
Labor	Carolyn Hirsh	19,971	49.2	+6.8
Liberal hold		Swing	−6.8	

=== Warrandyte ===
1982 Victorian state election: Warrandyte
Party	Candidate	Votes	%	±%
Labor	Lou Hill	14,697	44.1	+6.7
Liberal	Norman Lacy	14,444	43.3	−6.2
Democrats	Lynette Bartold	2,636	7.9	−4.5
Democratic Labor	Peter Ferwerda	842	2.5	+2.5
Independent	Diane Teasdale	716	2.2	+2.2
Total formal votes		33,335	98.3	0.0
Informal votes		569	1.7	0.0
Turnout		33,904	94.5	+0.6
Two-party-preferred result
Labor	Lou Hill	17,349	52.0	+8.1
Liberal	Norman Lacy	15,986	48.0	−8.1
Labor gain from Liberal		Swing	+8.1	

=== Warrnambool ===
1982 Victorian state election: Warrnambool
Party	Candidate	Votes	%	±%
Liberal	Ian Smith	14,640	58.9	+7.8
Labor	Paul Martin	8,780	35.3	+2.1
Democrats	Kathleen May	1,455	5.9	+5.9
Total formal votes		24,875	98.6	+0.8
Informal votes		353	1.4	−0.8
Turnout		25,228	95.2	−0.1
Two-party-preferred result
Liberal	Ian Smith	15,258	61.3	−1.1
Labor	Paul Martin	9,617	38.7	+1.1
Liberal hold		Swing	−1.1	

=== Werribee ===
1982 Victorian state election: Werribee
Party	Candidate	Votes	%	±%
Labor	Ken Coghill	24,932	64.7	+8.4
Liberal	John Kelly	10,782	28.0	−9.4
Democrats	Ivan Pollock	2,838	7.4	+7.4
Total formal votes		38,552	97.4	+0.1
Informal votes		1,044	2.6	−0.1
Turnout		39,596	94.3	+1.0
Two-party-preferred result
Labor	Ken Coghill	26,566	68.9	+10.8
Liberal	John Kelly	11,986	31.1	−10.8
Labor hold		Swing	+10.8	

=== Westernport ===
1982 Victorian state election: Westernport
Party	Candidate	Votes	%	±%
Liberal	Alan Brown	15,126	47.9	+14.4
Labor	Russell Joiner	13,153	41.6	+9.2
Independent	Lester Wyatt	1,944	6.2	+6.2
Democrats	Leslie Reubens	1,372	4.3	−0.6
Total formal votes		31,595	98.3	+0.6
Informal votes		546	1.7	−0.6
Turnout		32,141	93.4	−0.3
Two-party-preferred result
Liberal	Alan Brown	17,027	53.9	−6.0
Labor	Russell Joiner	14,568	46.1	+6.0
Liberal hold		Swing	−6.0	

=== Williamstown ===
1982 Victorian state election: Williamstown
Party	Candidate	Votes	%	±%
Labor	Gordon Stirling	18,245	68.2	+1.4
Liberal	Paul Carter	6,913	25.9	−7.3
Democrats	Peter Dalton	1,578	5.9	+5.9
Total formal votes		26,736	95.7	+0.8
Informal votes		1,198	4.3	−0.8
Turnout		27,934	94.3	+0.2
Two-party-preferred result
Labor	Gordon Stirling	19,152	71.6	+4.8
Liberal	Paul Carter	7,584	28.4	−4.8
Labor hold		Swing	+4.8	

== See also ==
- 1982 Victorian state election
- Members of the Victorian Legislative Assembly, 1982–1985
