= Electoral results for the district of Bennettswood =

Victoria, Australia, district election results

This is a list of electoral results for the electoral district of Bennettswood in Victorian state elections.

== Members for Bennettswood ==
Member	Party	Term
Ian McLaren	Liberal	1967–1979
Keith McCance	Liberal	1979–1982
Doug Newton	Labor	1982–1985
Roger Pescott	Liberal	1985–1992
Geoff Coleman	Liberal	1992–1999
Ron Wilson	Liberal	1999–2002

== Election results ==
=== Elections in the 1990s ===
1999 Victorian state election: Bennettswood
Party	Candidate	Votes	%	±%
Liberal	Ron Wilson	16,715	56.1	−2.0
Labor	Meryl Andrews	13,103	43.9	+4.4
Total formal votes		29,818	97.6	−0.5
Informal votes		733	2.4	+0.5
Turnout		30,551	93.1	
Liberal hold		Swing	−3.1	

1996 Victorian state election: Bennettswood
Party	Candidate	Votes	%	±%
Liberal	Geoff Coleman	17,685	58.0	+1.3
Labor	Ian Pirie	12,053	39.6	+5.7
Natural Law	Denis Quinlan	737	2.4	−1.1
Total formal votes		30,475	98.1	+1.8
Informal votes		580	1.9	−1.8
Turnout		31,055	94.4	
Two-party-preferred result
Liberal	Geoff Coleman	18,032	59.2	−2.6
Labor	Ian Pirie	12,415	40.8	+2.6
Liberal hold		Swing	−2.6	

1992 Victorian state election: Bennettswood
Party	Candidate	Votes	%	±%
Liberal	Geoff Coleman	17,256	56.8	+6.0
Labor	Jan Kennedy	10,306	33.9	−7.7
Natural Law	Denis Quinlan	1,066	3.5	+3.5
Independent	David Veitch	973	3.2	+3.2
Independent	Douglas Johnston	801	2.6	+2.6
Total formal votes		30,402	96.3	−0.7
Informal votes		1,172	3.7	+0.7
Turnout		31,574	95.2	
Two-party-preferred result
Liberal	Geoff Coleman	18,756	61.8	+8.5
Labor	Jan Kennedy	11,594	38.2	−8.5
Liberal hold		Swing	+8.5	

=== Elections in the 1980s ===
1988 Victorian state election: Bennettswood
Party	Candidate	Votes	%	±%
Liberal	Roger Pescott	14,159	50.25	+1.01
Labor	Nigel De Kretser	12,089	42.91	−5.38
Democrats	Geoff Carr	1,927	6.84	+6.84
Total formal votes		28,175	96.80	−0.88
Informal votes		931	3.20	+0.88
Turnout		29,106	93.88	−0.50
Two-party-preferred result
Liberal	Roger Pescott	14,710	52.22	+1.42
Labor	Nigel De Kretser	13,461	47.78	−1.42
Liberal hold		Swing	+1.42	

1985 Victorian state election: Bennettswood
Party	Candidate	Votes	%	±%
Liberal	Roger Pescott	14,266	49.2	+4.2
Labor	Doug Newton	13,993	48.3	+1.6
Independent	Ray Nilsen	716	2.5	+2.5
Total formal votes		28,975	97.7	
Informal votes		689	2.3	
Turnout		29,664	94.4	
Two-party-preferred result
Liberal	Roger Pescott	14,717	50.8	+2.0
Labor	Doug Newton	14,254	49.2	−2.0
Liberal gain from Labor		Swing	+2.0	

1982 Victorian state election: Bennettswood
Party	Candidate	Votes	%	±%
Liberal	Keith McCance	12,400	46.2	−3.9
Labor	Doug Newton	12,104	45.1	+5.6
Democrats	Alan Swindon	2,330	8.7	−1.7
Total formal votes		26,834	98.1	+0.1
Informal votes		509	1.9	−0.1
Turnout		27,343	95.4	+0.8
Two-party-preferred result
Labor	Doug Newton	13,517	50.4	+6.5
Liberal	Keith McCance	13,317	49.6	−6.5
Labor gain from Liberal		Swing	+6.5	

=== Elections in the 1970s ===
1979 Victorian state election: Bennettswood
Party	Candidate	Votes	%	±%
Liberal	Keith McCance	13,220	50.1	−5.2
Labor	Douglas Newton	10,426	39.5	+0.2
Democrats	Alan Swindon	2,749	10.4	+10.4
Total formal votes		26,395	98.1	−0.1
Informal votes		520	1.9	+0.1
Turnout		26,915	94.6	+0.4
Two-party-preferred result
Liberal	Keith McCance	14,806	56.1	−4.0
Labor	Douglas Newton	11,589	43.9	+4.0
Liberal hold		Swing	−4.0	

1976 Victorian state election: Bennettswood
Party	Candidate	Votes	%	±%
Liberal	Ian McLaren	14,732	55.3	+2.1
Labor	Peter Bruce	10,471	39.3	−0.9
Democratic Labor	James Tighe	1,430	5.4	−1.2
Total formal votes		26,633	98.2	
Informal votes		477	1.8	
Turnout		27,110	94.2	
Two-party-preferred result
Liberal	Ian McLaren	16,019	60.1	+1.0
Labor	Peter Bruce	10,614	39.9	−1.0
Liberal hold		Swing	+1.0	

1973 Victorian state election: Bennettswood
Party	Candidate	Votes	%	±%
Liberal	Ian McLaren	14,756	51.6	+6.9
Labor	Christopher Kennedy	11,964	41.8	−2.0
Democratic Labor	James Tighe	1,900	6.6	−4.9
Total formal votes		28,620	98.1	+0.1
Informal votes		538	1.9	−0.1
Turnout		29,158	94.7	−0.6
Two-party-preferred result
Liberal	Ian McLaren	16,371	57.2	+2.0
Labor	Christopher Kennedy	12,249	42.8	−2.0
Liberal hold		Swing	+2.0	

1970 Victorian state election: Bennettswood
Party	Candidate	Votes	%	±%
Liberal	Ian McLaren	11,463	44.7	−3.7
Labor	Cyril Kennedy	11,225	43.8	+4.9
Democratic Labor	James Tighe	2,946	11.5	−1.2
Total formal votes		25,634	98.0	+0.3
Informal votes		530	2.0	−0.3
Turnout		26,164	95.3	+0.2
Two-party-preferred result
Liberal	Ian McLaren	14,152	55.2	−4.9
Labor	Cyril Kennedy	11,482	44.8	+4.9
Liberal hold		Swing	−4.9	

=== Elections in the 1960s ===
1967 Victorian state election: Bennettswood
Party	Candidate	Votes	%	±%
Liberal	Ian McLaren	11,592	48.4	−0.1
Labor	Christopher Kennedy	9,300	38.9	+1.9
Democratic Labor	James Tighe	3,047	12.7	−1.8
Total formal votes		23,939	97.7	
Informal votes		550	2.3	
Turnout		24,489	95.1	
Two-party-preferred result
Liberal	Ian McLaren	14,378	60.1	−0.8
Labor	Christopher Kennedy	9,561	39.9	+0.8
Liberal hold		Swing	−0.8	
