= Candidates of the 1979 Victorian state election =

The 1979 Victorian state election was held on 5 May 1979.

== Seat changes ==
- Bendigo Liberal MLC Fred Grimwade contested Central Highlands.
- Boronia Liberal MLC Peter Block contested Nunawading.
- Monash Liberal MLC Charles Hider contested the lower house seat of Glenhuntly.
- Northern National MLC Stuart McDonald contested Bendigo.

== Retiring Members ==
- Note: Liberal MLA Athol Guy (Gisborne) had resigned prior to the election; no by-election was held.

=== Labor ===
- Val Doube MLA (Albert Park)
- Alan Lind MLA (Dandenong)
- Doug Elliot MLC (Melbourne)
- John Galbally MLC (Melbourne North)

=== Liberal ===
- Neville Hudson MLA (Werribee)
- Sam Loxton MLA (Prahran)
- Ian McLaren MLA (Bennettswood)
- Joe Rafferty MLA (Glenhuntly)
- Bill Stephen MLA (Ballarat South)
- Sir Kenneth Wheeler MLA (Essendon)
- William Fry MLC (Higinbotham)
- Stan Gleeson MLC (South Western)

== Legislative Assembly ==
Sitting members are shown in bold text. Successful candidates are highlighted in the relevant colour. Where there is possible confusion, an asterisk (*) is also used.

Electorate	Held by	Labor candidates	Liberal candidates	National candidates	Democrats candidates	Other candidates
Albert Park	Labor	Bunna Walsh	Donald Gillies		Marilyn Blair	
Ascot Vale	Labor	**Tom Edmunds**	Murray Kellam			
Ballarat North	Liberal	Bill Horrocks	**Tom Evans**			
Ballarat South	Liberal	Frank Sheehan	Joan Chambers		June Johnson	Glendon Ludbrook (Ind)
Balwyn	Liberal	Ann Jackson	**Jim Ramsay**		Ralph Corrie	
Benalla	National	Brian Cousins	Alan Jones	**Tom Trewin**		
Benambra	Liberal	Max Edgar	**Lou Lieberman**	John Bidgood		Dudley Schubert (Ind)
Bendigo	Liberal	Elaine Knight	**Daryl McClure**		Christopher Stoltz	
Bennettswood	Liberal	Doug Newton	Keith McCance		Alan Swindon	
Bentleigh	Liberal	Gordon Hockley	**Bob Suggett**			
Berwick	Liberal	Judith Wallace	**Rob Maclellan**		Grace Bayliss	
Box Hill	Liberal	Adrian Moore	**Donald Mackinnon**		Esther Poelman	
Brighton	Liberal	Christopher Kennedy	**Jeannette Patrick**			
Broadmeadows	Labor	**John Wilton**	Norman Walker		Barbara Duncan	
Brunswick	Labor	**Tom Roper**	Geoff Leigh			Philip Herington (CPA)
Bundoora	Labor	**John Cain**	Anthony Cree			Jamie Bogle (Ind)
Burwood	Liberal	Douglas Bennett	**Jeff Kennett**		Veronica Lysaght	
Carrum	Labor	**Ian Cathie**	Hugh Falconer		Wendy Kleeman	Brenda Heath (AP)
Caulfield	Liberal	Gilbert Wright	Ted Tanner		Allan Blankfield	**Charles Francis** (Ind)
Coburg	Independent	Peter Gavin	Nicholas Kosenko		Kenneth Goss	Raymond Berbling (Ind); John Flint (DLP); **Jack Mutton** (Ind)
Dandenong	Labor	Rob Jolly	Francis Holohan		Janice Bateman	Ruth Egg (SWP)
Doncaster	Liberal	Jean Downing	**Morris Williams**		Sydney Poulter	Max Mand (AP)
Dromana	Liberal	David Hassett	**Roberts Dunstan**	Kenneth Spunner	Laurence Amor	
Essendon	Liberal	Barry Rowe	Ian Hocking			Paul McManus (DLP)
Evelyn	Liberal	Warren Thomas	**Jim Plowman**		John Couzens	
Footscray	Labor	**Robert Fordham**	John Huntington			Peter Abrahamson (SWP)
Forest Hill	Liberal	Anne Blackburn	**John Richardson**		John Goodall	Wilhelm Kapphan (Ind)
Frankston	Liberal	Anna Stewart	**Graeme Weideman**		William Towers	
Geelong East	Liberal	Graham Ernst	**Phil Gude**		Reginald Swetten	Roderick Jordan (DLP)
Geelong North	Labor	**Neil Trezise**	John Dow			
Geelong West	Liberal	Hayden Shell	**Hayden Birrell**		Guenter Sahr	
Gippsland East	National	Graeme McIntyre	Philip Davis	**Bruce Evans**		
Gippsland South	National	Ronald Neal	David Kallady	**Neil McInnes**	Wilma Western	
Gisborne	Liberal	Ian Elliott	Tom Reynolds			
Glenhuntly	Liberal	Gerard Vaughan	Charles Hider			Gail Farrell (AP); John Mulholland (DLP)
Glenroy	Labor	**Jack Culpin**	Donald McClelland			
Greensborough	Labor	**Pauline Toner**	Ronald Turner		Leo Bates	Dorothy Prout (AP)
Hawthorn	Liberal	Kevin Zervos	**Walter Jona**		Albertus Steegstra	
Heatherton	Liberal	Peter Spyker	**Llew Reese**		Sonia Sargood	
Ivanhoe	Liberal	Tony Sheehan	**Bruce Skeggs**		Mario Piraino	
Keilor	Labor	**Jack Ginifer**	Vaclav Ubl			
Kew	Liberal	Wesley Blackmore	**Rupert Hamer**		Keith Bruckner	Stan Keon (DLP)
Knox	Labor	**Steve Crabb**	Gerald Ashman			Derek Kruse (Ind)
Lowan	Liberal	David Drake-Feary	**Jim McCabe**	Bill McGrath		
Malvern	Liberal	Kenneth Penaluna	**Lindsay Thompson**			Martin Cahill (Ind)
Melbourne	Labor	**Keith Remington**	John Campbell		Trevor Cooke	Roger Wilson (CPA)
Mentone	Liberal	Barry Hirt	**Bill Templeton**			Desmond Burke (DLP)
Midlands	Liberal	John Brumby	**Bill Ebery**		Janice Russell	
Mildura	National	Harry Sugars	David Mattiske	**Milton Whiting**		
Mitcham	Liberal	Michael Shatin	**George Cox**		Frank Andrewartha	Peter Allan (AP)
Monbulk	Liberal	Frank Cafarella	**Bill Borthwick**		Malcolm Matheson	Ian Wood (AP)
Morwell	Labor	**Derek Amos**	Ian Lockwood	Gary Black	Ross Ollquist	Robert McCracken (Ind)
Murray Valley	National	Abigail Donlon	Brian Lumsden	**Ken Jasper**		
Narracan	Liberal	William Rutherford	**Jim Balfour**	Douglas Hatfield	Alan Petschack	
Niddrie	Labor	**Jack Simpson**	Roslyn Crago		Bruce McNeill	Cecil Kirchner (Ind)
Noble Park	Labor	Tony Van Vliet	**Peter Collins**			
Northcote	Labor	**Frank Wilkes**	Lilian Heath			Ian Hughes (Ind)
Oakleigh	Liberal	Race Mathews	**Alan Scanlan**		Domenico Quadara	David Heath (AP); Elaine Mulholland (DLP)
Polwarth	Liberal	Ronald Wheaton	**Cec Burgin**	Gilbert Anderson	Kathleen May	
Portland	Liberal	Bill Lewis	**Don McKellar**	Roger Hallam		
Prahran	Liberal	Bob Miller	Tony De Domenico		Peter Bowden	Trevor McCandless (Ind)
Preston	Labor	**Carl Kirkwood**	Elie Obeid			
Reservoir	Labor	**Jim Simmonds**	Hugh Luscombe		Arno Vann	
Richmond	Labor	**Theo Sidiropoulos**	Wendy Leigh		Vivian Keating	Astridis Lalopoulos (Ind)
Ringwood	Liberal	Robert Wallace	**Peter McArthur**		Max Capon	Wilfrid Thiele (AP)
Ripon	Liberal	Alex Pope	**Tom Austin**	Robert Peck		
Rodney	National	Stephen Jones	Victor Kuhle	**Eddie Hann**	Janet Powell	
St Kilda	Liberal	David Hardy	**Brian Dixon**		Douglas Davidson	John Cotter (AP)
Sandringham	Liberal	Neville Garner	**Max Crellin**		Graeme Evans	
Shepparton	National	Marjorie Gillies	Haset Sali	**Peter Ross-Edwards**		
South Barwon	Liberal	Eric Young	**Aurel Smith**			
Springvale	Liberal	Kevin King	**Norman Billing**		James Wright	Edward Woods (Ind)
Sunshine	Labor	**Bill Fogarty**	Andreas Zafiropoulos		Algimantas Kacinskas	
Swan Hill	Liberal	Geoffrey Ferns	**Alan Wood**	Keith Warne		
Syndal	Liberal	Russell Oakley	**Geoff Coleman**		Christopher Prawdzic	
Wantirna	Liberal	Jeffrey Kaufman	**Geoff Hayes**		Colin Styring	John Benigno (AP)
Warrandyte	Liberal	Richard Davies	**Norman Lacy**		Robyn Barker	Dulcie Bethune (Ind)
Warrnambool	Liberal	Vernon Delaney	**Ian Smith**	Ian Symons		Gwenneth Trayling (Ind)
Werribee	Liberal	Ken Coghill	Stuart Southwick			Charles Skidmore (Ind)
Westernport	Liberal	Russell Joiner	Alan Brown	Lawrence Wintle	Ronald Bowman	**Doug Jennings** (Ind)
Williamstown	Labor	**Gordon Stirling**	Peter Morris			

== Legislative Council ==
Sitting members are shown in bold text. Successful candidates are highlighted in the relevant colour. Where there is possible confusion, an asterisk (*) is also used.

Province	Held by	Labor candidates	Liberal candidates	National candidates	Democrats candidates	Other candidates
Ballarat	Labor	**David Williams**	Clive Bubb			
Bendigo	Liberal	Alan Calder	John Radford	**Stuart McDonald**	Douglas Linford	
Boronia	Liberal	Richard Coughlin	Gracia Baylor			Peter Brown (Ind)
Central Highlands	Liberal	Max McDonald	**Fred Grimwade**			
Chelsea	Liberal	Eric Kent	Geoffrey Connard			
Doutta Galla	Labor	**David White**	Claus Salger			
East Yarra	Liberal	Jeanne Hendy	**Bill Campbell**		Michael McBride	
Geelong	Liberal	Rod Mackenzie	Gordon Hall			James Jordan (DLP)
Gippsland	Liberal	Thomas Matthews	**Dick Long**	John King	Ian Goldie	Bruce Ingle (Ind)
Higinbotham	Liberal	Geoffrey Fleming	Robert Lawson			
Melbourne	Labor	Evan Walker	Bill Stanley			
Melbourne North	Labor	Giovanni Sgro	Geoff Lutz			Eric Granger (Ind)
Melbourne West	Labor	Joan Coxsedge	Rino Baggio		Ivan Pollock	**Alexander Knight** (Ind)
Monash	Liberal	Howard Smith	Don Hayward			
North Eastern	National	Nicholas Paola	Bill Hunter	**Bill Baxter**	Diane Teasdale	
North Western	National	Pamela Fowler	Ian Milburn	**Ken Wright**		
Nunawading	Liberal	Alan Wearne	**Peter Block**		Jeffrey McAlpine	
South Eastern	Liberal	Norman Spencer	**Alan Hunt**	Donald McRae	Stefan Taficzuk	
Templestowe	Liberal	Mike Arnold	**Vasey Houghton**			
Thomastown	Labor	Glyde Butler	Kathleen Mulraney			
Waverley	Liberal	Cyril Kennedy	William McDonald		Frederick Steinicke	Stephen Buttery (Ind)
Western	Liberal	Henry Birrell	**Digby Crozier**	Clive Mitchell		
