= Results of the 1988 Victorian state election (Legislative Assembly) =

Australian state election results

Victorian state election, 1 October 1988 Legislative Assembly << 1985–1992 >>
Enrolled voters	2,739,614				
Votes cast	2,530,027		Turnout	92.35	-0.86
Informal votes	98,525		Informal	3.89	+1.21
Summary of votes by party
Party	Primary votes	%	Swing	Seats	Change
Labor	1,131,750	46.55	–3.46	46	– 1
Liberal	986,311	40.56	–1.30	33	+ 2
National	188,776	7.76	+0.47	9	– 1
Democrats	25,611	1.05	+1.05	0	± 0
Call to Australia	25,543	1.05	+1.05	0	± 0
Democratic Labour	6,018	0.25	+0.25	0	± 0
Independent	67,493	2.78	+1.94	0	± 0
Total	2,431,502			88	
Two-party-preferred
Labor	1,202,294	49.49	–1.21		
Liberal	1,227,295	50.51	+1.21		

This is a list of electoral district results for the Victorian 1988 election for the Legislative Assembly.

== Results by electoral district ==
=== Albert Park ===
1988 Victorian state election: Albert Park
Party	Candidate	Votes	%	±%
Labor	Bunna Walsh	11,939	51.15	−11.04
Liberal	Andrew Lindsay	7,542	32.31	−5.50
Independent	Anne Fahey	2,785	11.93	+11.93
Independent	Kathleen Brown	1,076	4.61	+4.61
Total formal votes		23,342	95.66	−1.07
Informal votes		1,060	4.34	+1.07
Turnout		24,402	85.47	−2.69
Two-party-preferred result
Labor	Bunna Walsh	13,733	58.88	−3.31
Liberal	Andrew Lindsay	9,589	41.12	+3.31
Labor hold		Swing	−3.31	

=== Ballarat North ===
1988 Victorian state election: Ballarat North
Party	Candidate	Votes	%	±%
Liberal	Steve Elder	14,183	47.50	−9.63
Labor	Steve Bracks	13,123	43.95	+1.08
National	Geoffrey Mark	1,903	6.37	+6.37
Independent	John Blanchard	653	2.19	+2.19
Total formal votes		29,862	98.21	−0.03
Informal votes		544	1.79	+0.03
Turnout		30,406	94.45	0.00
Two-party-preferred result
Liberal	Steve Elder	15,921	53.55	−3.58
Labor	Steve Bracks	13,810	46.45	+3.58
Liberal hold		Swing	−3.58	

=== Ballarat South ===
1988 Victorian state election: Ballarat South
Party	Candidate	Votes	%	±%
Labor	Frank Sheehan	14,320	46.47	−4.90
Liberal	Joan Chambers	13,385	43.44	−5.19
National	Donald Phelan	1,993	6.47	+6.47
Democrats	Phil Henseleit	1,116	3.62	+3.62
Total formal votes		30,814	97.55	−0.67
Informal votes		775	2.45	+0.67
Turnout		31,589	94.32	−0.40
Two-party-preferred result
Labor	Frank Sheehan	15,457	50.17	−1.20
Liberal	Joan Chambers	15,353	49.83	+1.20
Labor hold		Swing	−1.20	

=== Balwyn ===
1988 Victorian state election: Balwyn
Party	Candidate	Votes	%	±%
Liberal	Robert Clark	16,816	64.28	−1.15
Labor	George Theodoridis	9,344	35.72	+1.15
Total formal votes		26,160	97.41	−0.65
Informal votes		696	2.59	+0.65
Turnout		26,856	90.98	−1.51
Liberal hold		Swing	−1.15	

=== Bellarine ===
1988 Victorian state election: Bellarine
Party	Candidate	Votes	%	±%
Labor	Graham Ernst	13,865	46.07	−6.88
Liberal	Margaret Byrne	12,360	41.07	−5.98
National	John Foster	2,400	7.98	+7.98
Democrats	Laurie Levy	1,469	4.88	+4.88
Total formal votes		30,094	97.53	−0.62
Informal votes		763	2.47	+0.62
Turnout		30,857	93.51	−1.16
Two-party-preferred result
Labor	Graham Ernst	15,264	50.73	−2.22
Liberal	Margaret Byrne	14,822	49.27	+2.22
Labor hold		Swing	−2.22	

=== Benalla ===
1988 Victorian state election: Benalla
Party	Candidate	Votes	%	±%
National	Pat McNamara	12,004	42.54	−4.88
Labor	Barbara Stepan	8,394	29.75	−2.71
Liberal	Margaret Stribling	6,333	22.44	+2.32
Independent	Grant Triffett	909	3.22	+3.22
Call to Australia	Win Wise	576	2.04	+2.04
Total formal votes		28,216	97.76	−0.59
Informal votes		646	2.24	+0.59
Turnout		28,862	92.36	−0.25
Two-party-preferred result
National	Pat McNamara	19,173	67.95	+1.86
Labor	Barbara Stepan	9,043	32.05	−1.86
National hold		Swing	+1.86	

=== Benambra ===
1988 Victorian state election: Benambra
Party	Candidate	Votes	%	±%
Liberal	Lou Lieberman	16,424	56.54	−13.02
Labor	Julie Nelson	7,670	26.40	−4.04
National	Judith Brewer	4,955	17.06	+17.06
Total formal votes		29,049	97.66	−0.38
Informal votes		696	2.34	+0.38
Turnout		29,745	90.87	−0.38
Two-party-preferred result
Liberal	Lou Lieberman	20,788	71.59	+2.03
Labor	Julie Nelson	8,250	28.41	−2.03
Liberal hold		Swing	+2.03	

=== Bendigo East ===
1988 Victorian state election: Bendigo East
Party	Candidate	Votes	%	±%
Labor	Bob Cameron	12,179	41.09	−3.15
Liberal	Michael John	12,010	40.52	+1.82
National	Leon Waddington	3,908	13.19	−3.87
Call to Australia	Vic Upson	1,541	5.20	+5.20
Total formal votes		29,638	97.97	−0.45
Informal votes		614	2.03	+0.45
Turnout		30,252	93.75	−1.47
Two-party-preferred result
Liberal	Michael John	16,505	55.70	+1.81
Labor	Bob Cameron	13,127	44.30	−1.81
Liberal hold		Swing	+1.81	

=== Bendigo West ===
1988 Victorian state election: Bendigo West
Party	Candidate	Votes	%	±%
Labor	David Kennedy	13,881	44.97	−8.75
Liberal	William Maltby	9,534	30.89	−1.20
National	Peter McNaught	4,549	14.74	+0.55
Democrats	Peter Shaw-Truex	1,138	3.69	+3.69
Independent	Harold Hall	891	2.89	+2.89
Call to Australia	Graeme Furlong	876	2.84	+2.84
Total formal votes		30,869	97.39	−0.86
Informal votes		828	2.61	+0.86
Turnout		31,697	94.15	−0.80
Two-party-preferred result
Labor	David Kennedy	15,697	50.88	−8.76
Liberal	William Maltby	15,155	49.12	+8.76
Labor hold		Swing	−8.76	

=== Bennettswood ===
1988 Victorian state election: Bennettswood
Party	Candidate	Votes	%	±%
Liberal	Roger Pescott	14,159	50.25	+1.01
Labor	Nigel De Kretser	12,089	42.91	−5.38
Democrats	Geoff Carr	1,927	6.84	+6.84
Total formal votes		28,175	96.80	−0.88
Informal votes		931	3.20	+0.88
Turnout		29,106	93.88	−0.50
Two-party-preferred result
Liberal	Roger Pescott	14,710	52.22	+1.42
Labor	Nigel De Kretser	13,461	47.78	−1.42
Liberal hold		Swing	+1.42	

=== Bentleigh ===
1988 Victorian state election: Bentleigh
Party	Candidate	Votes	%	±%
Labor	Ann Barker	11,444	44.60	−5.51
Liberal	Peter Norman	11,130	43.41	−6.48
Democrats	Anne Martin	902	3.52	+3.52
Weekend Trading Party	Frank Penhalluriack	830	3.23	+3.23
Independent	Alan Salter	536	2.09	+2.09
Call to Australia	Phillip McGibbony	480	1.87	+1.87
Independent	Janette de San Sinforiano	329	1.28	+1.28
Total formal votes		25,660	95.88	−1.59
Informal votes		1,103	4.12	+1.59
Turnout		26,763	93.57	−0.70
Two-party-preferred result
Labor	Ann Barker	13,175	51.36	+1.25
Liberal	Peter Norman	12,475	48.64	−1.25
Labor hold		Swing	+1.25	

=== Berwick ===
1988 Victorian state election: Berwick
Party	Candidate	Votes	%	±%
Liberal	Rob Maclellan	16,777	49.49	−3.61
Labor	Philip Huggins	14,593	43.05	−3.85
Democrats	Jyan Mayfield	2,530	7.46	+7.46
Total formal votes		33,900	97.37	−0.29
Informal votes		915	2.63	+0.29
Turnout		34,815	93.21	−0.78
Two-party-preferred result
Liberal	Rob Maclellan	17,425	51.40	−1.70
Labor	Philip Huggins	16,475	48.60	+1.70
Liberal hold		Swing	−1.70	

=== Box Hill ===
1988 Victorian state election: Box Hill
Party	Candidate	Votes	%	±%
Labor	Margaret Ray	12,460	47.46	−3.32
Liberal	Helen Shardey	11,142	42.44	−2.26
Democrats	George Demetriou	1,128	4.30	+4.30
Call to Australia	William Watson	974	3.71	+3.71
Independent	Peter Allan	551	2.10	−2.42
Total formal votes		26,255	97.00	−1.08
Informal votes		812	3.00	+1.08
Turnout		27,067	92.90	−0.43
Two-party-preferred result
Labor	Margaret Ray	13,669	52.09	+0.24
Liberal	Helen Shardey	12,574	47.91	−0.24
Labor hold		Swing	+0.24	

=== Brighton ===
1988 Victorian state election: Brighton
Party	Candidate	Votes	%	±%
Liberal	Alan Stockdale	16,651	61.88	−0.22
Labor	Jennifer Huppert	9,642	35.83	−2.07
Independent	John Casley	617	2.29	+2.29
Total formal votes		26,910	97.14	−0.28
Informal votes		792	2.86	+0.28
Turnout		27,702	92.08	+0.14
Two-party-preferred result
Liberal	Alan Stockdale	16,968	63.05	+0.95
Labor	Jennifer Huppert	9,942	36.95	−0.95
Liberal hold		Swing	+0.95	

=== Broadmeadows ===
1988 Victorian state election: Broadmeadows
Party	Candidate	Votes	%	±%
Labor	Jim Kennan	12,489	55.17	−14.86
Independent	Jack Culpin	5,256	23.22	+23.22
Liberal	Carol Lutz	4,892	21.61	+21.61
Total formal votes		22,637	93.50	−1.62
Informal votes		1,573	6.50	+1.62
Turnout		24,210	91.44	−1.79
Two-party-preferred result
Labor	Jim Kennan	13,541	59.85	−10.18
Liberal	Carol Lutz	9,085	40.15	+10.18
Labor hold		Swing	−10.18	

- The two party preferred vote was not counted between the Labor and Independent candidates for Broadmeadows.

=== Brunswick ===
1988 Victorian state election: Brunswick
Party	Candidate	Votes	%	±%
Labor	Tom Roper	15,521	63.95	−6.93
Liberal	Louise Joyce	6,885	28.37	−1.05
Democratic Labor	Michael Rowe	1,863	7.68	+7.68
Total formal votes		24,269	92.88	−2.05
Informal votes		1,861	7.12	+2.05
Turnout		26,130	87.58	−2.24
Two-party-preferred result
Labor	Tom Roper	16,172	66.67	−3.91
Liberal	Louise Joyce	8,083	33.33	+3.91
Labor hold		Swing	−3.91	

=== Bulleen ===
1988 Victorian state election: Bulleen
Party	Candidate	Votes	%	±%
Liberal	David Perrin	16,588	59.22	+1.43
Labor	David Redfearn	11,424	40.78	−1.43
Total formal votes		28,012	95.54	−1.77
Informal votes		1,308	4.46	+1.77
Turnout		29,320	92.86	−1.23
Liberal hold		Swing	+1.43	

=== Bundoora ===
1988 Victorian state election: Bundoora
Party	Candidate	Votes	%	±%
Labor	John Cain	16,255	60.21	−0.35
Liberal	John Goodfellow	10,741	39.79	+7.18
Total formal votes		26,996	96.08	−1.92
Informal votes		1,100	3.92	+1.92
Turnout		28,096	93.13	−1.35
Labor hold		Swing	−2.69	

=== Burwood ===
1988 Victorian state election: Burwood
Party	Candidate	Votes	%	±%
Liberal	Jeff Kennett	13,759	52.90	−2.68
Labor	Eric Hobsbawn	10,938	42.06	−2.36
Call to Australia	Barbara McCrohan	1,310	5.04	+5.04
Total formal votes		26,007	97.58	−0.18
Informal votes		644	2.42	+0.18
Turnout		26,651	92.32	−0.81
Two-party-preferred result
Liberal	Jeff Kennett	14,458	55.59	+0.01
Labor	Eric Hobsbawn	11,549	44.41	−0.01
Liberal hold		Swing	+0.01	

=== Carrum ===
1988 Victorian state election: Carrum
Party	Candidate	Votes	%	±%
Labor	Mal Sandon	15,308	57.49	−1.94
Liberal	Marie McIntosh	11,320	42.51	+1.94
Total formal votes		26,628	95.94	−1.29
Informal votes		1,127	4.06	+1.29
Turnout		27,755	91.64	−1.47
Labor hold		Swing	−1.94	

=== Caulfield ===
1988 Victorian state election: Caulfield
Party	Candidate	Votes	%	±%
Liberal	Ted Tanner	13,531	55.10	−2.19
Labor	David Jackson	11,026	44.90	+2.19
Total formal votes		24,557	95.21	−1.64
Informal votes		1,235	4.79	+1.64
Turnout		25,792	89.30	−1.29
Liberal hold		Swing	−2.19	

=== Clayton ===
1988 Victorian state election: Clayton
Party	Candidate	Votes	%	±%
Labor	Gerard Vaughan	14,794	56.56	−3.27
Liberal	Lauris White	9,401	35.94	−4.23
Call to Australia	Daryl Esmore	1,482	5.67	+5.67
Independent	Stephen Bingle	477	1.82	+1.82
Total formal votes		26,154	94.36	−1.82
Informal votes		1,564	5.64	+1.82
Turnout		27,718	92.23	−1.73
Two-party-preferred result
Labor	Gerard Vaughan	15,412	58.94	−0.89
Liberal	Lauris White	10,737	41.06	+0.89
Labor hold		Swing	−0.89	

=== Coburg ===
1988 Victorian state election: Coburg
Party	Candidate	Votes	%	±%
Labor	Peter Gavin	15,353	61.27	−9.17
Liberal	Erdem Aydin	5,911	23.59	−5.97
Independent	Norma Willoughby	3,793	15.14	+15.14
Total formal votes		25,057	93.70	−2.35
Informal votes		1,685	6.30	+2.35
Turnout		26,742	91.16	−1.48
Two-party-preferred result
Labor	Peter Gavin	16,364	65.31	−5.13
Liberal	Erdem Aydin	8,691	34.69	+5.13
Labor hold		Swing	−5.13	

=== Dandenong ===
1988 Victorian state election: Dandenong
Party	Candidate	Votes	%	±%
Labor	Terry Norris	14,996	62.57	+1.50
Liberal	Poh Loh	8,971	37.43	−1.50
Total formal votes		23,967	93.12	−3.03
Informal votes		1,772	6.88	+3.03
Turnout		25,739	89.46	−2.52
Labor hold		Swing	+1.50	

=== Dandenong North ===
1988 Victorian state election: Dandenong North
Party	Candidate	Votes	%	±%
Labor	Jan Wilson	14,824	58.05	−1.06
Liberal	Peter McNeil	10,713	41.95	+1.06
Total formal votes		25,537	93.14	−3.38
Informal votes		1,882	6.86	+3.38
Turnout		27,419	92.16	−2.21
Labor hold		Swing	−1.06	

=== Derrimut ===
1988 Victorian state election: Derrimut
Party	Candidate	Votes	%	±%
Labor	David Cunningham	16,239	57.74	−7.88
Liberal	Helen Hurley	8,534	30.35	−4.03
Independent	Michael Newman	3,349	11.91	+11.91
Total formal votes		28,122	93.73	−2.66
Informal votes		1,880	6.27	+2.66
Turnout		30,002	93.01	−0.93
Two-party-preferred result
Labor	David Cunningham	17,759	63.27	−2.35
Liberal	Helen Hurley	10,310	36.73	+2.35
Labor hold		Swing	−2.35	

=== Doncaster ===
1988 Victorian state election: Doncaster
Party	Candidate	Votes	%	±%
Liberal	Victor Perton	14,885	52.95	−2.69
Labor	Steven Tsitas	11,163	39.71	−4.65
Independent	Wayne Wright	1,084	3.86	+3.86
Call to Australia	Guy Salthouse	977	3.48	+3.48
Total formal votes		28,109	96.41	−1.36
Informal votes		1,048	3.59	+1.36
Turnout		29,157	93.56	−0.93
Two-party-preferred result
Liberal	Victor Perton	16,143	57.43	+1.79
Labor	Steven Tsitas	11,964	42.57	−1.79
Liberal hold		Swing	+1.79	

=== Doveton ===
1988 Victorian state election: Doveton
Party	Candidate	Votes	%	±%
Labor	Rob Jolly	20,697	58.28	−6.60
Liberal	Rodney Lavin	14,816	41.72	+6.60
Total formal votes		35,513	94.41	−2.40
Informal votes		2,101	5.59	+2.40
Turnout		37,614	93.56	−0.39
Labor hold		Swing	−6.60	

=== Dromana ===
1988 Victorian state election: Dromana
Party	Candidate	Votes	%	±%
Liberal	Ron Wells	15,857	50.81	−1.62
Labor	Robert Reilly	14,013	44.90	−2.67
Independent	Cecil Gill	799	2.56	+2.56
Independent	Florence Bubb	541	1.73	+1.73
Total formal votes		31,210	97.48	−0.79
Informal votes		807	2.52	+0.79
Turnout		32,017	93.09	−0.55
Two-party-preferred result
Liberal	Ron Wells	16,175	51.83	−0.60
Labor	Robert Reilly	15,032	48.17	+0.60
Liberal hold		Swing	−0.60	

=== Essendon ===
1988 Victorian state election: Essendon
Party	Candidate	Votes	%	±%
Labor	Barry Rowe	13,862	55.55	−6.53
Liberal	Thomas Hilbert	10,404	41.70	+3.78
Call to Australia	Karl Benden	686	2.75	+2.75
Total formal votes		24,952	95.43	−1.26
Informal votes		1,194	4.57	+1.26
Turnout		26,146	89.57	−2.21
Two-party-preferred result
Labor	Barry Rowe	14,156	56.74	−5.34
Liberal	Thomas Hilbert	10,404	43.26	+5.34
Labor hold		Swing	−5.34	

=== Evelyn ===
1988 Victorian state election: Evelyn
Party	Candidate	Votes	%	±%
Liberal	Jim Plowman	16,393	52.78	+2.88
Labor	Geoff Cooper	13,690	44.07	−1.15
Independent	Earle Keegel	978	3.15	+3.15
Total formal votes		31,061	97.30	−0.59
Informal votes		863	2.70	+0.59
Turnout		31,924	93.51	−0.24
Two-party-preferred result
Liberal	Jim Plowman	16,774	54.00	+1.17
Labor	Geoffrey Cooper	14,287	46.00	−1.17
Liberal hold		Swing	+1.17	

=== Footscray ===
1988 Victorian state election: Footscray
Party	Candidate	Votes	%	±%
Labor	Robert Fordham	17,635	68.52	−4.83
Liberal	Ernest Zanatta	6,370	24.75	−1.90
Independent	Elizabeth Doughney	1,732	6.73	+6.73
Total formal votes		25,737	91.77	−3.46
Informal votes		2,307	8.23	+3.46
Turnout		28,044	89.16	−2.24
Two-party-preferred result
Labor	Robert Fordham	18,967	73.70	+0.35
Liberal	Ernest Zanatta	6,767	26.30	−0.35
Labor hold		Swing	+0.35	

=== Forest Hill ===
1988 Victorian state election: Forest Hill
Party	Candidate	Votes	%	±%
Liberal	John Richardson	14,557	52.88	−0.99
Labor	John Madden	12,971	47.12	+0.99
Total formal votes		27,528	96.07	−1.48
Informal votes		1,127	3.93	+1.48
Turnout		28,655	93.81	−0.90
Liberal hold		Swing	−0.99	

=== Frankston North ===
1988 Victorian state election: Frankston North
Party	Candidate	Votes	%	±%
Labor	Jane Hill	15,770	56.48	−1.41
Liberal	Olga Venables	10,379	37.17	−0.18
Independent	Mike Toldy	1,772	6.35	+6.35
Total formal votes		27,921	96.18	−1.34
Informal votes		1,110	3.82	+1.34
Turnout		29,031	92.58	−0.64
Two-party-preferred result
Labor	Jane Hill	16,427	58.83	−0.69
Liberal	Olga Venables	11,494	41.17	+0.69
Labor hold		Swing	−0.69	

=== Frankston South ===
1988 Victorian state election: Frankston South
Party	Candidate	Votes	%	±%
Liberal	Graeme Weideman	15,415	54.91	+1.29
Labor	Tony Moore	12,656	45.09	−1.29
Total formal votes		28,071	96.88	−0.81
Informal votes		903	3.12	+0.81
Turnout		28,974	92.16	−0.95
Liberal hold		Swing	+1.29	

=== Geelong ===
1988 Victorian state election: Geelong
Party	Candidate	Votes	%	±%
Labor	Hayden Shell	13,276	50.01	−6.05
Liberal	Ann Henderson	11,876	44.74	+0.80
Call to Australia	Ian Winter	1,394	5.25	+5.25
Total formal votes		26,546	97.15	−0.54
Informal votes		778	2.85	+0.54
Turnout		27,324	91.80	−0.97
Two-party-preferred result
Labor	Hayden Shell	13,941	52.52	−3.54
Liberal	Ann Henderson	12,601	47.48	+3.54
Labor hold		Swing	−3.54	

=== Geelong North ===
1988 Victorian state election: Geelong North
Party	Candidate	Votes	%	±%
Labor	Neil Trezise	16,802	61.61	−4.14
Liberal	Michael King	9,230	33.84	−0.41
Call to Australia	Ernest Andrews	1,240	4.55	+4.55
Total formal votes		27,272	94.81	−1.80
Informal votes		1,493	5.19	+1.80
Turnout		28,765	93.23	−0.51
Two-party-preferred result
Labor	Neil Trezise	17,457	64.02	−1.73
Liberal	Michael King	9,810	35.98	+1.73
Labor hold		Swing	−1.73	

=== Gippsland East ===
1988 Victorian state election: Gippsland East
Party	Candidate	Votes	%	±%
National	Bruce Evans	13,218	46.99	−2.63
Labor	Jan Devink	8,232	29.26	−1.40
Liberal	William Young	6,162	21.91	+2.19
Call to Australia	Robert Watson	518	1.84	+1.84
Total formal votes		28,130	97.91	−0.57
Informal votes		601	2.09	+0.57
Turnout		28,713	92.44	−0.27
Two-party-preferred result
National	Bruce Evans	19,384	69.42	+1.90
Labor	Jan Devink	8,538	30.58	−1.90
National hold		Swing	+1.90	

=== Gippsland South ===
1988 Victorian state election: Gippsland South
Party	Candidate	Votes	%	±%
National	Tom Wallace	13,951	48.00	−0.93
Labor	Keith Vardy	7,845	26.99	+1.57
Liberal	Anne-Marie McBeath	6,562	22.58	−3.07
Call to Australia	Leslie Howlett	709	2.44	+2.44
Total formal votes		29,067	97.99	−0.47
Informal votes		596	2.01	+0.47
Turnout		29,663	93.18	+0.12
Two-party-preferred result
National	Tom Wallace	20,375	70.17	+1.90
Labor	Keith Vardy	8,662	29.83	+29.83
National hold		Swing	+1.90	

=== Gippsland West ===
1988 Victorian state election: Gippsland West
Party	Candidate	Votes	%	±%
Liberal	Alan Brown	16,670	52.57	+3.28
Labor	Anwyn Martin	11,539	36.39	+0.47
National	Philip Westwood	3,500	11.04	−3.75
Total formal votes		31,709	97.65	−0.59
Informal votes		762	2.35	+0.59
Turnout		32,471	93.74	−1.03
Two-party-preferred result
Liberal	Alan Brown	19,832	62.58	+0.48
Labor	Anwyn Martin	11,859	37.42	−0.48
Liberal hold		Swing	+0.48	

=== Gisborne ===
1988 Victorian state election: Gisborne
Party	Candidate	Votes	%	±%
Liberal	Tom Reynolds	18,061	54.46	−3.06
Labor	Eric Dearricott	13,964	42.11	−0.37
Independent	Glenn Torney	1,138	3.43	+3.43
Total formal votes		33,163	97.46	−0.83
Informal votes		866	2.54	+0.83
Turnout		34,029	93.46	−1.28
Two-party-preferred result
Liberal	Tom Reynolds	18,697	56.38	−1.14
Labor	Eric Dearricott	14,466	43.62	+1.14
Liberal hold		Swing	−1.14	

=== Glen Waverley ===
1988 Victorian state election: Glen Waverley
Party	Candidate	Votes	%	±%
Liberal	Ross Smith	16,045	55.88	−4.20
Labor	Ronald Kirkwood	11,415	39.75	−0.17
Call to Australia	Peter Olney	1,254	4.37	+4.37
Total formal votes		28,714	96.53	−1.01
Informal votes		1,032	3.47	+1.01
Turnout		29,746	94.58	−0.95
Two-party-preferred result
Liberal	Ross Smith	16,787	58.46	−1.62
Labor	Ronald Kirkwood	11,927	41.54	+1.62
Liberal hold		Swing	−1.62	

=== Greensborough ===
1988 Victorian state election: Greensborough
Party	Candidate	Votes	%	±%
Labor	Pauline Toner	16,622	56.07	+0.98
Liberal	Robert Manuell	13,022	43.93	−0.98
Total formal votes		29,644	96.76	−1.05
Informal votes		992	3.24	+1.05
Turnout		30,636	93.92	+0.17
Labor hold		Swing	+0.98	

=== Hawthorn ===
1988 Victorian state election: Hawthorn
Party	Candidate	Votes	%	±%
Liberal	Phil Gude	15,213	58.03	+2.28
Labor	Bridget Groves	11,001	41.97	−2.28
Total formal votes		26,214	96.82	−0.61
Informal votes		861	3.18	+0.61
Turnout		27,075	89.33	−1.15
Liberal hold		Swing	+2.28	

=== Ivanhoe ===
1988 Victorian state election: Ivanhoe
Party	Candidate	Votes	%	±%
Liberal	Vin Heffernan	13,931	50.33	−1.30
Labor	Patricia Moynihan	11,671	42.16	−6.21
Democrats	Howard McCallum	2,079	7.51	+7.51
Total formal votes		27,681	97.26	−0.48
Informal votes		780	2.74	+0.48
Turnout		28,461	92.94	−0.61
Two-party-preferred result
Liberal	Vin Heffernan	14,505	52.40	+0.77
Labor	Patricia Moynihan	13,176	47.60	−0.77
Liberal hold		Swing	+0.77	

=== Keilor ===
1988 Victorian state election: Keilor
Party	Candidate	Votes	%	±%
Labor	George Seitz	18,601	57.86	−3.60
Liberal	Chris Dimitrijevic	11,346	35.30	−3.24
Democratic Labor	Shane McCarthy	1,274	3.96	+3.96
Independent	Charles Campagnac	925	2.88	+2.88
Total formal votes		32,146	94.22	−2.35
Informal votes		1,972	5.78	+2.35
Turnout		34,118	92.34	−2.13
Two-party-preferred result
Labor	George Seitz	19,726	61.39	−0.07
Liberal	Chris Dimitrijevic	12,404	38.61	+0.07
Labor hold		Swing	−0.07	

=== Kew ===
1988 Victorian state election: Kew
Party	Candidate	Votes	%	±%
Liberal	Jan Wade	15,715	61.00	+0.80
Labor	Tim Muffet	10,048	39.00	−0.80
Total formal votes		25,763	96.51	−0.58
Informal votes		932	3.49	+0.58
Turnout		26,695	90.37	−1.54
Liberal hold		Swing	+0.80	

=== Knox ===
1988 Victorian state election: Knox
Party	Candidate	Votes	%	±%
Labor	Steve Crabb	14,173	53.27	−6.05
Liberal	Bruce Bingham	10,311	38.75	+1.84
Call to Australia	Kenneth Morgan	1,077	4.05	+4.05
Independent	Stephen Gillies	1,047	3.93	+3.93
Total formal votes		26,608	96.66	−1.21
Informal votes		918	3.34	+1.21
Turnout		27,526	93.45	−0.73
Two-party-preferred result
Labor	Steve Crabb	14,896	55.99	−4.63
Liberal	Bruce Bingham	11,709	44.01	+4.63
Labor hold		Swing	−4.63	

=== Lowan ===
1988 Victorian state election: Lowan
Party	Candidate	Votes	%	±%
National	Bill McGrath	16,468	61.03	−2.13
Liberal	Roderick Coutts	6,003	22.25	+4.03
Labor	Robert Luciani	4,511	16.72	−1.90
Total formal votes		26,982	98.62	−0.29
Informal votes		377	1.38	+0.29
Turnout		27,359	95.42	−0.41
Two-party-preferred result
National	Bill McGrath	22,134	82.04	+2.17
Labor	Robert Luciani	4,845	17.96	−2.17
National hold		Swing	+2.17	

- The two party preferred vote was not counted between the National and Liberal candidates for Lowan.

=== Malvern ===
1988 Victorian state election: Malvern
Party	Candidate	Votes	%	±%
Liberal	Geoff Leigh	15,429	61.95	+2.14
Labor	Philip Cottier	9,478	38.05	−2.14
Total formal votes		24,907	96.81	−0.90
Informal votes		820	3.19	+0.90
Turnout		25,727	89.91	−1.05
Liberal hold		Swing	+2.14	

=== Melbourne ===
1988 Victorian state election: Melbourne
Party	Candidate	Votes	%	±%
Labor	Neil Cole	15,270	68.03	+7.07
Liberal	Catherine Dossetor	7,177	31.97	−0.19
Total formal votes		22,447	93.47	−2.22
Informal votes		1,569	6.53	+2.22
Turnout		24,016	84.87	−0.61
Labor hold		Swing	+4.71	

=== Mentone ===
1988 Victorian state election: Mentone
Party	Candidate	Votes	%	±%
Labor	Peter Spyker	12,971	48.58	−3.39
Liberal	Maxwell Read	11,976	44.85	−3.18
Democrats	Sarah Austin	1,240	4.64	+4.64
Independent	John Murray	515	1.93	+1.93
Total formal votes		26,702	97.00	−0.43
Informal votes		825	3.00	+0.43
Turnout		27,527	93.02	−0.66
Two-party-preferred result
Labor	Peter Spyker	13,989	52.40	+0.43
Liberal	Maxwell Read	12,707	47.60	−0.43
Labor hold		Swing	+0.43	

=== Mildura ===
1988 Victorian state election: Mildura
Party	Candidate	Votes	%	±%
National	John Arnold	10,594	38.26	−20.43
Liberal	Craig Bildstien	8,849	31.96	+13.54
Labor	Lindsay Leake	5,962	21.53	−1.36
Independent	David Caccianiga	2,287	8.26	+8.26
Total formal votes		27,692	97.52	−0.37
Informal votes		703	2.48	+0.37
Turnout		28,395	92.52	−0.08
Two-candidate-preferred result
Liberal	Craig Bildstien	14,096	50.96	+50.96
National	John Arnold	13,565	49.04	−26.55
Liberal gain from National		Swing	N/A	

=== Mitcham ===
1988 Victorian state election: Mitcham
Party	Candidate	Votes	%	±%
Labor	John Harrowfield	12,380	45.98	−7.73
Liberal	Matthew Starr	11,548	42.89	−3.40
Democrats	Louise Enders	1,830	6.80	+6.80
Call to Australia	Johan Elsmann	1,164	4.32	+4.32
Total formal votes		26,922	97.10	−0.42
Informal votes		805	2.90	+0.42
Turnout		27,727	93.72	−0.71
Two-party-preferred result
Labor	John Harrowfield	14,247	52.95	−0.76
Liberal	Matthew Starr	12,661	47.05	+0.76
Labor hold		Swing	−0.76	

=== Monbulk ===
1988 Victorian state election: Monbulk
Party	Candidate	Votes	%	±%
Labor	Neil Pope	14,384	51.89	−1.82
Liberal	Nola Vulling	12,167	43.89	−2.40
Call to Australia	Christopher Shirreff	1,168	4.21	+4.21
Total formal votes		27,719	97.26	−0.50
Informal votes		781	2.74	+0.50
Turnout		28,500	92.77	+0.14
Two-party-preferred result
Labor	Neil Pope	14,840	53.54	−0.17
Liberal	Nola Vulling	12,879	46.46	+0.17
Labor hold		Swing	−0.17	

=== Mornington ===
1988 Victorian state election: Mornington
Party	Candidate	Votes	%	±%
Liberal	Robin Cooper	16,363	49.93	−2.06
Labor	Barry Smith	14,017	42.77	−5.24
Democrats	Peter Carroll	2,393	7.30	+7.30
Total formal votes		32,773	96.77	−0.95
Informal votes		1,093	3.23	+0.95
Turnout		33,866	92.49	+0.11
Two-party-preferred result
Liberal	Robin Cooper	17,050	52.03	+0.04
Labor	Barry Smith	15,719	47.97	−0.04
Liberal hold		Swing	+0.04	

=== Morwell ===
1988 Victorian state election: Morwell
Party	Candidate	Votes	%	±%
Labor	Keith Hamilton	11,675	42.03	−10.68
Liberal	Norman Olsen	5,577	20.08	−5.53
Independent	Barry Murphy	3,687	13.27	+13.27
National	Alan Witchell	3,507	12.63	+4.23
Independent	Geoffrey Francis	2,597	9.35	+9.35
Democrats	James Richards	733	2.64	+2.64
Total formal votes		27,776	96.61	−1.20
Informal votes		975	3.39	+1.20
Turnout		28,751	94.28	+0.65
Two-party-preferred result
Labor	Keith Hamilton	14,654	52.79	−6.08
Liberal	Norman Olsen	13,105	47.21	+6.08
Labor hold		Swing	−6.08	

=== Murray Valley ===
1988 Victorian state election: Murray Valley
Party	Candidate	Votes	%	±%
National	Ken Jasper	17,354	58.17	−0.84
Labor	Jill Milthorpe	7,813	26.19	−0.49
Liberal	Diane Mathieson	4,664	15.63	+1.32
Total formal votes		29,831	98.09	−0.10
Informal votes		581	1.91	+0.10
Turnout		30,412	92.53	−1.57
Two-party-preferred result
National	Ken Jasper	21,286	71.37	−0.76
Labor	Jill Milthorpe	8,539	28.63	+0.76
National hold		Swing	−0.76	

=== Narracan ===
1988 Victorian state election: Narracan
Party	Candidate	Votes	%	±%
Labor	Neil Young	12,281	44.14	−2.18
Liberal	John Delzoppo	11,612	41.73	−1.87
National	Kenneth Ipsen	2,783	10.00	+3.01
Democrats	David White	1,148	4.13	+4.13
Total formal votes		27,824	97.50	−0.47
Informal votes		713	2.50	+0.47
Turnout		28,537	93.85	−0.63
Two-party-preferred result
Liberal	John Delzoppo	14,371	51.67	+1.31
Labor	Neil Young	13,443	48.33	−1.31
Liberal hold		Swing	+1.31	

=== Niddrie ===
1988 Victorian state election: Niddrie
Party	Candidate	Votes	%	±%
Labor	Bob Sercombe	14,717	54.23	−8.76
Liberal	Susan Feltham	10,336	38.09	+1.08
Independent	Lance Hutchinson	2,083	7.68	+7.68
Total formal votes		27,136	94.35	−2.06
Informal votes		1,625	5.65	+2.06
Turnout		28,761	93.91	−1.27
Two-party-preferred result
Labor	Bob Sercombe	15,763	58.11	−4.88
Liberal	Susan Feltham	11,365	41.89	+4.88
Labor hold		Swing	−4.88	

=== Northcote ===
1988 Victorian state election: Northcote
Party	Candidate	Votes	%	±%
Labor	Tony Sheehan	17,900	71.67	−0.17
Liberal	Ross Lane	7,075	28.33	+0.17
Total formal votes		24,975	93.10	−2.41
Informal votes		1,851	6.90	+2.41
Turnout		26,826	89.73	−1.02
Labor hold		Swing	−0.17	

=== Oakleigh ===
1988 Victorian state election: Oakleigh
Party	Candidate	Votes	%	±%
Labor	Race Mathews	12,645	50.41	−3.40
Liberal	Ian Pope	9,560	38.11	−4.91
Independent	Heather Norling	1,736	6.92	+6.92
Independent	Antonis Pashos	919	3.66	+0.49
Independent	Philip Mitchell	225	0.90	+0.90
Total formal votes		25,085	95.33	−1.82
Informal votes		1,228	4.67	+1.82
Turnout		26,313	91.54	−0.26
Two-party-preferred result
Labor	Race Mathews	14,353	57.26	+2.37
Liberal	Ian Pope	10,715	42.74	−2.37
Labor hold		Swing	+2.37	

=== Pascoe Vale ===
1988 Victorian state election: Pascoe Vale
Party	Candidate	Votes	%	±%
Labor	Kelvin Thomson	12,846	50.64	−10.71
Liberal	Geoff Lutz	9,013	35.53	−3.12
Independent	Cath Price	2,251	8.87	+8.87
Democratic Labor	Mark Beshara	1,255	4.95	+4.95
Total formal votes		25,365	96.08	−0.36
Informal votes		1,035	3.92	+0.36
Turnout		26,400	92.10	−2.16
Two-party-preferred result
Labor	Kelvin Thomson	13,803	54.44	−6.91
Liberal	Geoff Lutz	11,551	45.56	+6.91
Labor hold		Swing	−6.91	

=== Polwarth ===
1988 Victorian state election: Polwarth
Party	Candidate	Votes	%	±%
Liberal	Ian Smith	15,716	54.04	−0.42
Labor	Paul Kennelly	8,799	30.26	+0.89
National	Michael Evans	4,565	15.70	−0.47
Total formal votes		29,080	97.88	−0.56
Informal votes		630	2.12	+0.56
Turnout		29,710	94.64	−1.34
Two-party-preferred result
Liberal	Ian Smith	19,213	66.07	−1.60
Labor	Paul Kennelly	9,867	33.93	+1.60
Liberal hold		Swing	−1.60	

=== Portland ===
1988 Victorian state election: Portland
Party	Candidate	Votes	%	±%
Liberal	Denis Napthine	12,451	46.10	−4.16
Labor	Bill Sharrock	9,359	34.65	+0.39
National	Graeme Dawson	5,197	19.24	+3.76
Total formal votes		27,007	98.36	−0.22
Informal votes		451	1.64	+0.22
Turnout		27,458	93.56	−1.29
Two-party-preferred result
Liberal	Denis Napthine	16,527	61.22	−1.69
Labor	Bill Sharrock	9,359	38.78	+1.69
Liberal hold		Swing	−1.69	

=== Prahran ===
1988 Victorian state election: Prahran
Party	Candidate	Votes	%	±%
Liberal	Don Hayward	13,531	56.05	+2.62
Labor	Roman Jade	10,020	41.50	+0.28
Call to Australia	Neil Baluch	592	2.45	+2.45
Total formal votes		24,143	95.91	−1.28
Informal votes		1,029	4.09	+1.28
Turnout		25,172	86.46	−1.80
Two-party-preferred result
Liberal	Don Hayward	13,864	57.42	+0.48
Labor	Roman Jade	10,279	42.58	−0.48
Liberal hold		Swing	+0.48	

=== Preston ===
1988 Victorian state election: Preston
Party	Candidate	Votes	%	±%
Labor	Michael Leighton	18,026	71.07	+1.50
Liberal	Peter Papaemmanouil	7,336	28.93	−1.50
Total formal votes		25,362	92.94	−2.84
Informal votes		1,928	7.06	+2.84
Turnout		27,290	90.40	−0.91
Labor hold		Swing	+1.50	

=== Reservoir ===
1988 Victorian state election: Reservoir
Party	Candidate	Votes	%	±%
Labor	Jim Simmonds	14,352	55.49	−13.17
Liberal	Richard Michelsons	7,163	27.69	−3.65
Independent	Alan Hogan	4,350	16.82	+16.82
Total formal votes		25,865	93.13	−2.65
Informal votes		1,908	6.87	+2.65
Turnout		27,773	92.36	−1.47
Two-party-preferred result
Labor	Jim Simmonds	17,174	66.41	−2.25
Liberal	Richard Michelsons	8,688	33.59	+2.25
Labor hold		Swing	−2.25	

=== Richmond ===
1988 Victorian state election: Richmond
Party	Candidate	Votes	%	±%
Labor	Demetri Dollis	14,630	60.42	−10.99
Liberal	David Monk	5,452	22.51	−6.08
Democratic Labor	John Mulholland	1,626	6.71	+6.71
Independent	Bill Hampson	1,395	5.76	+5.76
Independent	Steve Florin	1,112	4.59	+4.59
Total formal votes		24,215	92.43	−2.80
Informal votes		1,984	7.57	+2.80
Turnout		26,199	86.11	−0.96
Two-party-preferred result
Labor	Demetri Dollis	16,273	67.28	−4.13
Liberal	David Monk	7,915	32.72	+4.13
Labor hold		Swing	−4.13	

=== Ringwood ===
1988 Victorian state election: Ringwood
Party	Candidate	Votes	%	±%
Labor	Kay Setches	13,203	46.90	−5.80
Liberal	Bruce Camfield	12,383	43.98	−3.32
Democrats	Sid Spindler	1,270	4.51	+4.51
Call to Australia	Mark Ansell	783	2.78	+2.78
Independent	James Cockell	515	1.83	+1.83
Total formal votes		28,154	97.10	−0.79
Informal votes		842	2.90	+0.79
Turnout		28,996	92.94	−0.94
Two-party-preferred result
Labor	Kay Setches	14,358	51.66	−1.04
Liberal	Bruce Camfield	13,606	48.34	+1.04
Labor hold		Swing	−1.04	

=== Ripon ===
1988 Victorian state election: Ripon
Party	Candidate	Votes	%	±%
Liberal	Tom Austin	16,120	56.90	+0.38
Labor	John McQuilten	12,208	43.10	−0.38
Total formal votes		28,328	97.59	−0.66
Informal votes		699	2.41	+0.66
Turnout		29,027	94.62	−0.88
Liberal hold		Swing	+0.38	

=== Rodney ===
1988 Victorian state election: Rodney
Party	Candidate	Votes	%	±%
National	Eddie Hann	19,330	66.57	−3.87
Labor	Leonard Blair	5,795	19.96	+0.73
Liberal	Margarita Dale	3,913	13.48	+3.15
Total formal votes		29,038	98.32	−0.31
Informal votes		496	1.68	+0.31
Turnout		29,534	94.57	−0.05
Two-party-preferred result
National	Eddie Hann	22,823	78.62	−1.30
Labor	Leonard Blair	6,208	21.38	+1.30
National hold		Swing	−1.30	

=== St Albans ===
1988 Victorian state election: St Albans
Party	Candidate	Votes	%	±%
Labor	Alex Andrianopoulos	16,296	59.94	−11.03
Liberal	George Korytsky	7,582	27.89	−1.14
Independent	Peter Portelli	3,308	12.17	+12.17
Total formal votes		27,186	90.28	−3.54
Informal votes		2,928	9.72	+3.54
Turnout		30,114	92.07	−1.35
Two-party-preferred result
Labor	Alex Andrianopoulos	17,041	62.71	−8.26
Liberal	George Korytsky	10,132	37.29	+8.26
Labor hold		Swing	−8.26	

=== St Kilda ===
1988 Victorian state election: St Kilda
Party	Candidate	Votes	%	±%
Labor	Andrew McCutcheon	11,652	49.83	−2.82
Liberal	John Callanan	9,988	42.72	−4.63
Democrats	Geoffrey Brooks	1,742	7.45	+7.45
Total formal votes		23,382	95.33	−1.12
Informal votes		1,146	4.67	+1.12
Turnout		24,528	87.10	−1.81
Two-party-preferred result
Labor	Andrew McCutcheon	12,993	55.57	+2.92
Liberal	John Callanan	10,389	44.43	−2.92
Labor hold		Swing	+2.92	

=== Sandringham ===
1988 Victorian state election: Sandringham
Party	Candidate	Votes	%	±%
Liberal	David Lea	14,476	54.78	−0.10
Labor	Ian Pugh	11,296	42.75	−2.37
Call to Australia	John Minty	652	2.47	+2.47
Total formal votes		26,424	97.53	−0.23
Informal votes		669	2.47	+0.23
Turnout		27,093	92.11	−0.66
Two-party-preferred result
Liberal	David Lea	14,891	56.36	+1.48
Labor	Ian Pugh	11,532	43.64	−1.48
Liberal hold		Swing	+1.48	

=== Shepparton ===
1988 Victorian state election: Shepparton
Party	Candidate	Votes	%	±%
National	Peter Ross-Edwards	15,570	54.68	−1.96
Labor	David Wauchope	7,581	26.62	+0.59
Liberal	John Menzies	5,323	18.69	+1.36
Total formal votes		28,474	97.56	−0.48
Informal votes		711	2.44	+0.48
Turnout		29,185	93.95	+0.15
Two-party-preferred result
National	Peter Ross-Edwards	20,353	71.50	−1.03
Labor	David Wauchope	8,112	28.50	+1.03
National hold		Swing	−1.03	

=== South Barwon ===
1988 Victorian state election: South Barwon
Party	Candidate	Votes	%	±%
Liberal	Harley Dickinson	14,821	52.11	−1.29
Labor	George Williams	11,848	41.66	−4.94
Call to Australia	Terry Winter	1,774	6.24	+6.24
Total formal votes		28,443	97.63	−0.40
Informal votes		690	2.37	+0.40
Turnout		29,133	93.47	−2.35
Two-party-preferred result
Liberal	Harley Dickinson	15,590	54.82	+1.42
Labor	George Williams	12,848	45.18	−1.42
Liberal hold		Swing	+1.42	

=== Springvale ===
1988 Victorian state election: Springvale
Party	Candidate	Votes	%	±%
Labor	Eddie Micallef	14,900	52.86	−4.15
Liberal	Kieran Magee	10,479	39.68	−3.31
Call to Australia	Jodie Rickard	1,320	5.00	+5.00
National	Wernfried Klimek	650	2.46	+2.46
Total formal votes		26,409	92.73	−3.21
Informal votes		2,071	7.27	+3.21
Turnout		28,480	93.20	−0.57
Two-party-preferred result
Labor	Eddie Micallef	14,900	56.42	−0.59
Liberal	Kieran Magee	11,509	43.38	+0.59
Labor hold		Swing	−0.59	

=== Sunshine ===
1988 Victorian state election: Sunshine
Party	Candidate	Votes	%	±%
Labor	Ian Baker	16,285	66.40	−4.67
Liberal	Julie Reid	6,423	26.19	−2.74
Independent	Alan Finch	1,817	7.41	+7.41
Total formal votes		24,525	92.39	−3.15
Informal votes		2,020	7.61	+3.15
Turnout		26,545	90.71	−1.65
Two-party-preferred result
Labor	Ian Baker	17,513	71.49	+0.42
Liberal	Julie Reid	6,984	28.51	−0.42
Labor hold		Swing	+0.42	

=== Swan Hill ===
1988 Victorian state election: Swan Hill
Party	Candidate	Votes	%	±%
National	Barry Steggall	15,539	60.74	+2.38
Labor	Ronald Stanton	5,132	20.06	−0.64
Liberal	Daphne Wilkins	4,912	19.20	−1.74
Total formal votes		25,583	98.20	−0.29
Informal votes		468	1.80	+0.29
Turnout		26,051	92.99	−1.25
Two-party-preferred result
National	Barry Steggall	19,940	77.96	+2.17
Labor	Ronald Stanton	5,638	22.04	+22.04
National hold		Swing	+2.17	

=== Syndal ===
1988 Victorian state election: Syndal
Party	Candidate	Votes	%	±%
Liberal	Geoff Coleman	11,905	46.23	−3.51
Labor	James Claven	11,241	43.65	−3.76
Democrats	Martin Maguire	1,575	6.12	+6.12
Call to Australia	Ronald Marshman	1,032	4.01	+4.01
Total formal votes		25,753	96.54	−0.96
Informal votes		922	3.46	+0.96
Turnout		26,675	93.24	−2.10
Two-party-preferred result
Liberal	Geoff Coleman	13,044	50.66	−0.69
Labor	James Claven	12,704	49.34	+0.69
Liberal hold		Swing	−0.69	

=== Thomastown ===
1988 Victorian state election: Thomastown
Party	Candidate	Votes	%	±%
Labor	Beth Gleeson	21,324	72.37	−1.53
Liberal	Michael Fusco	8,141	27.63	+1.53
Total formal votes		29,465	91.91	−3.45
Informal votes		2,595	8.09	+3.45
Turnout		32,060	92.66	−1.83
Labor hold		Swing	−1.53	

=== Wantirna ===
1988 Victorian state election: Wantirna
Party	Candidate	Votes	%	±%
Labor	Carolyn Hirsh	14,696	51.70	−3.56
Liberal	Rob Llewellyn	12,585	44.27	−0.47
Call to Australia	John Taylor	1,144	4.02	+4.02
Total formal votes		28,425	96.72	−0.62
Informal votes		965	3.28	+0.62
Turnout		29,390	94.67	−0.69
Two-party-preferred result
Labor	Carolyn Hirsh	15,048	52.94	−2.32
Liberal	Rob Llewellyn	13,374	47.06	+2.32
Labor hold		Swing	−2.32	

=== Warrandyte ===
1988 Victorian state election: Warrandyte
Party	Candidate	Votes	%	±%
Liberal	Phil Honeywood	14,268	47.22	+0.79
Labor	Lou Hill	13,007	43.04	−5.70
Democrats	David Ball	1,391	4.60	+4.60
Call to Australia	Nelleke Arnold	820	2.71	+2.71
Independent	Harold Collins	375	1.24	+1.24
Independent	Joy Lane	358	1.18	+1.18
Total formal votes		30,219	97.25	−0.95
Informal votes		854	2.75	+0.95
Turnout		31,073	93.93	−0.46
Two-party-preferred result
Liberal	Phil Honeywood	15,555	51.49	+1.65
Labor	Lou Hill	14,655	48.51	−1.65
Liberal gain from Labor		Swing	+1.65	

=== Warrnambool ===
1988 Victorian state election: Warrnambool
Party	Candidate	Votes	%	±%
National	John McGrath	14,838	52.44	+20.25
Liberal	Eda Ritchie	7,244	25.60	−15.84
Labor	Peter Steele	6,213	21.96	−4.41
Total formal votes		28,295	98.62	−0.35
Informal votes		397	1.38	+0.35
Turnout		28,692	94.94	+0.21
Two-party-preferred result
National	John McGrath	21,866	77.28	
Labor	Peter Steele	6,429	22.72	
National hold		Swing		

- The two party preferred vote was not counted between the National and Liberal candidates for Warrnambool.

=== Werribee ===
1988 Victorian state election: Werribee
Party	Candidate	Votes	%	±%
Labor	Ken Coghill	18,788	56.21	+2.42
Liberal	Alexander Mather	10,509	31.44	−6.98
Independent	John Gibbons	4,125	12.34	+12.34
Total formal votes		33,421	96.22	−1.71
Informal votes		1,350	3.88	+1.71
Turnout		34,772	94.10	+1.25
Two-party-preferred result
Labor	Ken Coghill	20,204	60.51	+4.05
Liberal	Alexander Mather	13,187	39.49	−4.05
Labor hold		Swing	+4.05	

=== Whittlesea ===
1988 Victorian state election: Whittlesea
Party	Candidate	Votes	%	±%
Labor	Max McDonald	18,279	54.70	+0.09
Liberal	Geoffrey Parsons	15,139	45.30	−0.09
Total formal votes		33,418	96.57	−1.14
Informal votes		1,186	3.43	+1.14
Turnout		34,604	93.84	−0.54
Labor hold		Swing	+0.09	

=== Williamstown ===
1988 Victorian state election: Williamstown
Party	Candidate	Votes	%	±%
Labor	Joan Kirner	17,154	63.29	−5.48
Liberal	Stuart Mackley	8,181	30.18	−1.05
Independent	Richard Kirby	1,770	6.53	+6.53
Total formal votes		27,105	93.92	−2.27
Informal votes		1,756	6.08	+2.27
Turnout		28,861	92.41	−0.87
Two-party-preferred result
Labor	Joan Kirner	18,338	67.72	−1.05
Liberal	Stuart Mackley	8,743	32.28	+1.05
Labor hold		Swing	−1.05	

== See also ==
- 1988 Victorian state election
- Members of the Victorian Legislative Assembly, 1988–1992
