= Electoral results for the district of Syndal =

Victoria, Australia, district election results

This is a list of electoral results for the electoral district of Syndal in Victorian state elections.

== Members for Syndal ==
Member	Party	Term
Ray Wiltshire	Liberal	1967–1976
Geoff Coleman	Liberal	1976–1982
David Gray	Labor	1982–1985
Geoff Coleman	Liberal	1985–1992

== Election results ==
=== Elections in the 1980s ===
1988 Victorian state election: Syndal
Party	Candidate	Votes	%	±%
Liberal	Geoff Coleman	11,905	46.23	−3.51
Labor	James Claven	11,241	43.65	−3.76
Democrats	Martin Maguire	1,575	6.12	+6.12
Call to Australia	Ronald Marshman	1,032	4.01	+4.01
Total formal votes		25,753	96.54	−0.96
Informal votes		922	3.46	+0.96
Turnout		26,675	93.24	−2.10
Two-party-preferred result
Liberal	Geoff Coleman	13,044	50.66	−0.69
Labor	James Claven	12,704	49.34	+0.69
Liberal hold		Swing	−0.69	

1985 Victorian state election: Syndal
Party	Candidate	Votes	%	±%
Liberal	Geoff Coleman	13,492	49.7	+6.3
Labor	David Gray	12,862	47.4	+0.8
Independent	Edward Hawthorn	773	2.9	+2.9
Total formal votes		27,127	97.5	
Informal votes		696	2.5	
Turnout		27,823	95.3	
Two-party-preferred result
Liberal	Geoff Coleman	13,929	51.4	+1.5
Labor	David Gray	13,198	48.6	−1.5
Liberal gain from Labor		Swing	+1.5	

1982 Victorian state election: Syndal
Party	Candidate	Votes	%	±%
Labor	David Gray	13,567	49.3	+4.4
Liberal	Geoff Coleman	11,153	40.5	−5.9
Democrats	Fraser Hercus	1,802	6.6	−2.1
Democratic Labor	Paul Carroll	1,008	3.7	+3.7
Total formal votes		27,530	97.8	+1.0
Informal votes		608	2.2	−1.0
Turnout		28,138	94.6	+0.6
Two-party-preferred result
Labor	David Gray	14,826	53.8	+4.5
Liberal	Geoff Coleman	12,704	46.2	−4.5
Labor gain from Liberal		Swing	+4.5	

=== Elections in the 1970s ===
1979 Victorian state election: Syndal
Party	Candidate	Votes	%	±%
Liberal	Geoff Coleman	12,586	46.4	−9.7
Labor	Russell Oakley	12,183	44.9	+1.0
Democrats	Christopher Prawdzic	2,354	8.7	+8.7
Total formal votes		27,123	96.8	−0.5
Informal votes		881	3.2	+0.5
Turnout		28,004	94.0	+0.5
Two-party-preferred result
Liberal	Geoff Coleman	13,752	50.7	−5.4
Labor	Russell Oakley	13,371	49.3	+5.4
Liberal hold		Swing	−5.4	

1976 Victorian state election: Syndal
Party	Candidate	Votes	%	±%
Liberal	Geoff Coleman	14,898	56.1	+7.5
Labor	John Perryman	11,638	43.9	+4.0
Total formal votes		26,536	97.3	
Informal votes		748	2.7	
Turnout		27,284	93.5	
Liberal hold		Swing	−1.0	

1973 Victorian state election: Syndal
Party	Candidate	Votes	%	±%
Liberal	Ray Wiltshire	20,029	52.3	+5.6
Labor	Christopher Miller	13,386	35.0	−3.5
Democratic Labor	Daniel McCabe	2,724	7.2	−7.6
Australia	Kenneth Mylius	2,135	5.6	+5.6
Total formal votes		38,292	97.9	+0.1
Informal votes		801	2.1	−0.1
Turnout		39,093	94.4	−1.3
Two-party-preferred result
Liberal	Ray Wiltshire	23,217	60.6	+2.2
Labor	Christopher Miller	15,075	39.4	−2.2
Liberal hold		Swing	+2.2	

1970 Victorian state election: Syndal
Party	Candidate	Votes	%	±%
Liberal	Ray Wiltshire	15,341	46.7	−3.3
Labor	Peter Setford	12,667	38.5	+2.6
Democratic Labor	Daniel McCabe	4,872	14.8	+0.8
Total formal votes		32,880	97.8	−0.1
Informal votes		731	2.2	+0.1
Turnout		33,611	95.7	+0.4
Two-party-preferred result
Liberal	Ray Wiltshire	19,210	58.4	−3.6
Labor	Peter Setford	13,670	41.6	+3.6
Liberal hold		Swing	−3.6	

=== Elections in the 1960s ===
1967 Victorian state election: Syndal
Party	Candidate	Votes	%	±%
Liberal	Ray Wiltshire	13,400	50.0	−4.0
Labor	Robert Fordham	9,634	35.9	+4.2
Democratic Labor	John Rose	3,761	14.0	−0.4
Total formal votes		26,795	97.9	
Informal votes		567	2.1	
Turnout		27,362	95.3	
Two-party-preferred result
Liberal	Ray Wiltshire	16,597	62.0	−4.3
Labor	Robert Fordham	10,198	38.0	+4.3
Liberal hold		Swing	−4.3	
