= Sir Robert Menzies Lecture =

Annual event in Melbourne, Australia

The Sir Robert Menzies Lecture is an annual lecture delivered in Melbourne, by a prominent politician, academic or other noteworthy individual, about various aspects of modern liberalism. The lectures have been held annually since 1978, and are named in honour of Sir Robert Menzies, Australia's longest-serving prime minister.

== History ==
The lecture was first proposed by the Monash University Liberal Club in 1976, when the president of the club was Michael Kroger, and it was held in its early years at the Clayton campus of the university. The inaugural speaker was the then Prime Minister Malcolm Fraser. The 1981 appearance of Margaret Thatcher drew strong protests from students; at the same time, Thatcher's lecture was one of the best-remembered of the series - receiving coverage on the front page of The Times in London as Thatcher rebuked former Tory prime minister Edward Heath and his call for a consensus government.

After the first lecture, the Sir Robert Menzies Lecture Trust was established to ensure the year-to-year running of the finances and organisation of the lecture. The inaugural chairman of the Trust was Dr Alan Gregory AM (1978 to 2010). Since 2010, Ron Wilson has been chairman of the Trust.

The lecture is now held each year at various locations in Melbourne, including Parliament House, Melbourne. The Monash University Liberal Club continues to be involved with the Trust in the operation of the lecture.

John Howard is the only person to have given the lecture on two occasions (in 1980 when he was the Federal Treasurer, and again in 1996 after he had become Prime Minister).

== Patrons ==
Sir Robert Menzies willingly agreed to lend his name to the Trust, but died before the inaugural lecture was delivered. The founding patron of the lecture was Sir Robert's widow, Dame Pattie Menzies, and the current patron is their daughter Mrs Heather Henderson AM.

== Lecturers ==
Year	Lecturer	Position	Venue
1978	Malcolm Fraser	Prime Minister	Monash University, Clayton Campus
1979	Andrew Peacock	Minister for Foreign Affairs	Monash University, Clayton Campus
1980	John Howard	Treasurer	Monash University, Clayton Campus
1981	Margaret Thatcher	Prime Minister of the United Kingdom	Robert Blackwood Hall, Monash University
1982	Sir Garfield Barwick	Former Chief Justice of Australia and Former Attorney-General	Monash University, Clayton Campus
1983	Sir Shridath (Sonny) Ramphal	Commonwealth Secretary-General	Monash University, Clayton Campus
1984	Sir Robert Muldoon	Prime Minister of New Zealand	Mannix College, Monash University
1985	Professor David Kemp	Professor of Politics, Monash University	Monash University, Clayton Campus
1986	Hugh Morgan	CEO of Western Mining Corporation	Monash University, Clayton Campus
1987	Dame Leonie Kramer	Professor of English, University of Sydney and former ABC Chair	Monash University, Clayton Campus
1988	Don Mazankowski	Deputy Prime Minister of Canada	Monash University, Clayton Campus
1989	Sir Paul Hasluck	Former Governor-General	Monash University, Clayton Campus
1990	John Hewson	Leader of the Liberal Party	Monash University, Clayton Campus
1991	Emeritus Professor Geoffrey Blainey	Former Dean of Arts at the University of Melbourne	Monash University, Clayton Campus
1992	Jeff Kennett	Premier of Victoria	Monash University, Clayton Campus
1993	Sir Harry Gibbs	Former Chief Justice of Australia	Monash University, Clayton Campus
1994	Professor Allan Martin	Professor of History, Australian National University	Monash University, Clayton Campus
1995	Sir Zelman Cowen	Former Governor-General	Monash University, Clayton Campus
1996	John Howard	Prime Minister	Monash University, Caulfield Campus
1997	Peter Costello	Treasurer	Monash University, Caulfield Campus
1998	Don Argus	CEO of National Australia Bank	Monash University, Caulfield Campus
1999	Petro Georgiou	Member of Parliament (Sir Robert Menzies's former seat of Kooyong)	Monash University, Caulfield Campus
2000	Claude Smadja	Managing director of the World Economic Forum	Parliament of Victoria
2001	Chris Patten	UK Member of the European Commission	Parliament of Victoria
2002	Alexander Downer	Minister for Foreign Affairs	Parliament of Victoria
2003	Tony Abbott	Minister for Health and Ageing	Parliament of Victoria
2004	Philip Ruddock	Attorney-General	Parliament of Victoria
2005	Michael Thawley	Australian Ambassador to the United States	Parliament of Victoria
2006	Julie Bishop	Minister for Education, Science and Training	Parliament of Victoria
2007	Richard Alston	Australian High Commissioner to the United Kingdom	Naval and Military Club, Melbourne
2008	Gerard Henderson	Executive Director of the Sydney Institute	Parliament of Victoria
2009	Malcolm Turnbull	Leader of the Liberal Party	Parliament of Victoria
2010	Lecture Postponed due to ill health of lecturer		
2011	Noel Pearson	Director, Cape York Institute	Parliament of Victoria
2012	Jeff Bleich	United States Ambassador to Australia	Parliament of Victoria
2013	Lecture Postponed due to Federal election		
2014	Josh Frydenberg	Member of Parliament (Sir Robert Menzies's former seat of Kooyong)	Parliament of Victoria
2015	Christopher Pyne	Minister for Education and Training	Hotel Windsor, Melbourne
2016	Paul Kelly	Editor, The Australian	Hotel Windsor, Melbourne
2017	Robert Doyle	Lord Mayor of Melbourne	Melbourne Town Hall
2018	Lecture Postponed due to change in Federal leadership		
2019	Scott Morrison	Prime Minister	Ernst & Young, Melbourne
2022	Sir Peter Cosgrove	Former Governor-General	Deloitte, Melbourne
