= Roger Pescott =

Australian politician (born 1946)

Roger Pescott (born 30 May 1946) is a former Australian diplomat and politician.

He was born in Melbourne and graduated with a Master of Arts from the Australian National University in 1970. In 1971 he became a diplomat, with postings to New Delhi (1971–1972), East Berlin (1975–1976), Brussels (1976–1979) and London (1979–1980). He was also a member of the Australian delegation to the United Nations General Assembly in 1972 and a member of the 2nd NPT Review Conference in Geneva in 1980.

In 1981 he left the diplomatic service to become a managing director.

A member of the Liberal Party, he was elected to the Victorian Legislative Assembly in 1985 as the member for Bennettswood, transferring to Mitcham in 1992. Immediately after his election he was appointed Secretary to the Shadow Cabinet, and he quickly rose to the front bench as Shadow Minister for Consumer Affairs and Tourism. In 1989 he moved to Transport and also became Deputy Leader of the Opposition, but in 1990 he lost those roles and was Shadow Minister for Manufacturing Industry and Commerce. Following the 1992 state election, which was won by the Coalition, Pescott became Minister for Industry Services, serving until 1996.

Pescott resigned his seat in 1997, ‘in protest at the undermining, as Pescott saw it, of the power of the Auditor General and a belief the AG would no longer be able to fulfil an independent watchdog role.’. Pescott’s final speech in parliament featured a blistering attack on Premier, Jeff Kennett who he accused of not listening to advice and not fostering debate within the party room.

The seat of Mitcham was lost by the Liberal Party and won by Tony Robinson for the Labor Party. Pescott's resignation from Parliament is widely referenced as the beginning of the end of the Kennett Government.

Victorian Legislative Assembly
Preceded by Doug Newton	Member for Bennettswood; 1985–1992	Succeeded by Geoff Coleman
Preceded by John Harrowfield	Member for Mitcham; 1992–1997	Succeeded by Tony Robinson
