= Ron Wilson (Australian politician) =

Australian politician

Ronald Charles Wilson (born 16 June 1958) is an Australian former politician. He was the Liberal member for Bennettswood in the Victorian Legislative Assembly from 1999 to 2002.

Wilson was born in Mildura, Victoria to Ronald Ernest Wilson and Jane Davidson Forbes. He attended Catholic schools in Ballarat, before completing year 12 in 1976 at another Catholic school, Mazenod College in Mulgrave. He received his Bachelor of Arts in 1980 from Monash University, and had a long history with the Liberal Party. In 1984, Wilson became research assistant to the Deputy President of the Senate. In 1990, Wilson became senior policy advisor to Rod Atkinson, the federal member for Isaacs, and in 1992, moved to the office of the state Minister for Housing and Aged Care and to the Minister for Health in 1996. He had run for the state seat of Mildura unsuccessfully in 1982.

In 1999, Wilson was elected as the Liberal member for Bennettswood in the Victorian Parliament. In 2001, he was made Opposition Parliamentary Secretary for Industry and Industrial Relations, and in 2002, was promoted to the shadow ministry as Shadow Minister for Health. However, in 2002 his seat was abolished, and he was defeated running for the new seat of Mount Waverley. Following his defeat, he became Chief of Staff to the Opposition Leader in the Parliament of Victoria. Since 2014 he has been CEO of Navy Health and prior to that he was the executive director of the Health Insurance Restricted Membership Association of Australia (HIRMAA), serving in that role from 2006 to 2014. Since 2010, Wilson has been chairman of the Sir Robert Menzies Lecture Trust.

His daughter Jess Wilson was elected to the seat of Kew for the Liberal Party at the 2022 Victorian state election. Then in 2025, she was elected to the leadership of the Victorian Liberal Party, becoming Leader of the Opposition.

Parliament of Victoria
Preceded by Geoff Coleman	Member for Bennettswood; 1999–2002	Succeeded by Seat abolished
