= Ian McLaren =

Australian politician

Ian Francis McLaren (30 March 1912 – 17 April 2000) OBE, F.R.H.S.V., was an Australian politician, accountant, businessman, historian, bibliographer and book-collector.

== Early life ==
McLaren was born at Launceston in Tasmania to draper Alexander Morrison McLaren and Elsie Elizabeth Gibbins. He attended Caulfield Grammar School and the University of Melbourne, becoming an accountant. In 1938 he embarked on a world tour, returning in 1939. He served in the Royal Australian Navy, from 1942 to 1945, and attained the rank of lieutenant. After the war he returned to Melbourne, where he became a partner in the accountancy firm Harris & McLaren.

On 16 April 1941 he married Eileen Porter, with whom he had four children.

== Political career ==
From 1945 to 1947 he was the independent member for Glen Iris in the Victorian Legislative Assembly. Following his defeat he joined the Liberal Party, and served on Malvern City Council from 1951 to 1953.

In 1965, he returned to the Legislative Assembly as the Liberal member for Caulfield, changing seats to Bennettswood in 1967. He served on 22 committees in the house. From 1973, he was deputy speaker. McLaren retired from politics in 1979.

== Historian, bibliographer and book collector ==
He was a long-standing member of the Royal Historical Society of Victoria (RHSV). He served as its President (1956–1959) and contributed to its journal, Victorian Historical Magazine, and to other history and cultural periodicals. He also wrote thirteen entries for the Australian Dictionary of Biography.

He was a prolific bibliographer and produced numerous published bibliographies, including "major contributions to Australian bibliography". His first was Local Histories of Australia (1954). Others dealt with the Latrobe Valley, Burke & Wills, Australian aviation, Australian exploration, the Parliament of Victoria, Marcus Clarke and C.J. Dennis. He was appointed the honorary bibliographer at Melbourne University (Baillieu) Library in 1976. He was a contributor to the Bibliography of Australia (1941–1969).

McLaren was a noted book-collector specialising in Australiana. He was a member of the Book Collectors Society of Australia and served a term as president of that organisation. He began collecting in 1943 and by 1974 he owned 40,000 books. The book collection grew so large that he had to sell his home in Malvern and buy a bigger house in the same suburb to accommodate his library. His collection of Australiana books was extensive, "totalling about 35,000 volumes". It was presented to the University of Melbourne where it is housed in the Special Collections (rare books) Department of the Baillieu Library. A further 5,000 volumes of "local histories, church histories, business histories and organisational histories" were donated to the National Library of Australia in 1965.

== Other activities ==
As a businessman, McLaren was Deputy Chairman of Kiwi International and a director of the Gas and Fuel Corporation of Victoria (1963–1965).

From 1946 to 1957 he was the Chairman of the Wyperfeld National Park, President of the Youth Hostels Association of Victoria (1947–48), President of the Good Neighbour Council of Victoria (1950s), a delegate to the Australian Constitutional Conventions (1973–78), a member of the Estate Agents Committee (1956–65) a member of the Melbourne University Council (1977–79), chairman of the Australian Wool Authority and a member of the History Advisory Council of Victoria (1977–79).

He was President of the Australian YMCA (1957–1963) and Vice-President of the World YMCA (1961–1969).

== Personal life ==
McLaren died in Prahran, Victoria on 17 April 2000. He was survived by his wife Eileen (Chun) to whom he had been married "for 59 years" and their four children.

== Honours ==
McLaren was awarded the OBE in 1959.

In 1964, was made a Fellow of the Royal Historical Society of Victoria.

He was presented with an honorary Doctorate of Literature by the University of Melbourne in 1996.

At the time of his death Lindsay Thompson, the former Premier of Victoria, wrote of him,

During the 88 years of his life he achieved as much as an average citizen might be expected to achieve in two lifetimes

Another obituary noted,

He spoke with vigour, clarity and concisenesses. And with all these qualities and qualifications Mr McLaren mixed integrity, friendliness and courtesy in his relations with others.

== Bibliography ==
- Local History in Australia, Melbourne, s.n., 1954.
- Australian Aviation : A Bibliographical Survey, [Melbourne] : Privately printed, 1958.
- The Victorian Exploring Expedition and Relieving Expeditions, 1860–61 : The Burke and Wills Tragedy, [Melbourne] : Royal Historical Society of Victoria, 1960.
- C.J. Dennis: His Life and Work, Melbourne : Hall's Book Store, 1961.
- William John Willis 1834–1861, Prahran, Vic. : Hall's Book Store, Printers, [1961].
- The McEvoy Gold Mine Disaster, 1895, [Melbourne? : s.n., 1962].
- Edward Edgar Pescott, 1872–1954, [Melbourne : Victorian Historical Society, 1965].
- McLaren Collection, [Canberra : National Library of Australia, ca. 1966]; followed by: McLaren Collection Catalogue: Supplement, 1966.
- The Library of Ian F. McLaren, Melbourne : Hawthorn Press, 1974.
- C.J. Dennis : A Chronological Checklist of Contributions to Journals, [Adelaide] : Libraries Board of S.A., 1976.
- C.J. Dennis, A Comprehensive Bibliography Based on the Collection of the Compiler, Adelaide : Libraries Board of South Australia, 1979.
- C.J. Dennis in the Herald and Weekly Times, Melbourne : Dalriada Press, 1981.
- Marcus Clarke, An Annotated Bibliography, Melbourne : Library Council of Victoria, 1982.
- Talking About C.J. Dennis, Melbourne : English Department, Monash University, 1982.
- C.J. Dennis : A Supplement to a Comprehensive Bibliography, Together with a Consolidated Index to the Compiler's Dennis Publications, Adelaide : Libraries Board of South Australia, 1983.
- John Dunmore Lang : A Comprehensive Bibliography of a Turbulent Australian Scot, Parkville, Vic. : University of Melbourne Library, 1985.
- Whitcombe's Story Books : A Trans-Tasman Survey, Parkville : University of Melbourne Library, 1984. Joint author: George J. Griffiths. Followed by: Whitcombe's Story Books : A Trans-Tasman Survey, 1987.
- The Chinese in Victoria : Official Reports and Documents, Ascot Vale [Vic.] : Red Rooster Press, 1985.
- Adam Lindsay Gordon : A Comprehensive Bibliography, Parkville : University of Melbourne Library, 1986.
- Cabinet Photographs and Postcards relating to Adam Lindsay Gordon, [Parkville, Vic. : Ian Francis McLaren], c. 1986.
- Grace Jennings Carmichael, from Croajingolong to London : with an Annotated Bibliography, Parkville (Vic.] : University of Melbourne Library, 1986.
- Index to the Weekly Times Annual 1911–1934 : With a Bibliography of Charles Leslie Barrett, Parkville [Vic.] : University of Melbourne Library, 1986.
- Mary Gaunt, A Cosmopolitan Australian : An Annotated Bibliography, Parkville [Vic.] : University of Melbourne Library, 1986.
- Henry Kendall : A Comprehensive Bibliography, Parkville [Vic.] : University of Melbourne Library, 1987.
- Towards a Comprehensive Bibliography of Henry Kendall, Melbourne : Dalriada Press, 1987.
- Aireys Inlet from Anglesea to Cinema Point : History Based on Material Prepared by Ian F. McLaren, [Anglesea, Vic.] : Anglesea & District Historical Society for Aireys Inlet District Association, 1988.
- Australian Explorers by Sea, Land and Air, 1788–1988, Parkville, Vic. : University of Melbourne Library, 1988–1991.
- Henry Tolman Dwight : Bookseller and Publisher, Parkville [Vic.] : University of Melbourne Library, 1989.
- James Lionel Michael : A Comprehensive Bibliography, Parkville [Vic.] : University of Melbourne Library, 1989.
- The Caxton Press of Christchurch, New Zealand : Annotated Bibliography, 1933–1977 of Items Mainly held in the Collection of the Compiler, Melbourne : Dalriada Press, 1993.
- Laperouse in the Pacific, including Searches by d'Entrecasteaux, Dillon, Dumont d'Urville : An Annotated Bibliography, Parkville [Vic.] : University of Melbourne Library, 1993.
- The Literature of Malvern, Victoria : A Bibliography, Malvern, [Vic.] : City of Malvern, 1993.
- Representative Government in Victoria, 1851–1993 : A Bibliography, Melbourne : Library Committee, Parliament of Victoria, 1993.
- Australian Air Power : An Annotated Bibliography, Melbourne : Dalriada Press, 1994.
- Australian Civil Aviation : An Annotated Bibliography, Melbourne : Dalriada Press, 1994.
- United States Air Power in Australia and the South Pacific : An Annotated bibliography, Melbourne : Dalriada Press, 1994.
- Frank William Boreham (1871–1959) : A Select Bibliography, Parkville, Vic. : Whitley College, University of Melbourne, 1997.

Victorian Legislative Assembly
New seat	Member for Glen Iris; 1945–1947	Succeeded by Les Norman
Preceded by Alexander Fraser	Member for Caulfield; 1965–1967	Succeeded by Edgar Tanner
New seat	Member for Bennettswood; 1967–1979	Succeeded by Keith McCance
