= David Gray (Australian politician) =

Australian politician

David James Frederick Gray (born 8 February 1956) is an Australian politician.

He was born in Sunshine to draughtsman James Thomson Gray and Beverley Gladys Mary Richards. He attended Deer Park State School, Sunshine West High School and then Monash University, where he received a Bachelor of Arts and a Bachelor of Laws. He later studied at the Beijing Language Institute and at Wuhan University. He joined the Labor Party while at Monash and was president of the student ALP Club from 1976 to 1977, and president of the National Council of ALP Students from 1977 to 1978.

He worked as an inspector for the Victorian Public Service Board from 1980 to 1981 and was then an articled clerk, before being called to the bar in 1982. He was also secretary of the Syndal Labor branch and later president of the Notting Hill branch. In 1982 he was elected to the Victorian Legislative Assembly as the Labor member for Syndal, but he was defeated in 1985.

Gray was president of the Creswick branch of the Labor Party from 2003 to 2005. He later became a prosecutor with the Office of Public Prosecutions in Victoria, before switching to a role managing the newly emerging area of Proceeds of Crime confiscations. In 2012 he was recruited by the Australian Federal Police to establish a Proceeds of Crime litigation function to enforce national proceeds of crime legislation.

Victorian Legislative Assembly
Preceded by Geoff Coleman	Member for Syndal; 1982–1985	Succeeded by Geoff Coleman
