= Keith McCance =

Australian politician

Keith Robert McCance (28 November 1929 – 2 January 2008) was an Australian politician.

He was born in Ascot Vale to schoolteacher Robert Norman McLeod McCance and Ivy Emily McGill. He was educated at Korumburra, Kew East and Box Hill before graduating from Wesley College in 1947. He worked in a variety of jobs and in 1946 joined the Kew branch of the Liberal Party. On 7 February 1953 he married Joy Myra Cullis; they had two children. McCance eventually became a share registrar, managing share companies from 1960 to 1979. In 1979 he was elected to the Victorian Legislative Assembly for Bennettswood, but he was defeated after a single term in 1982. He subsequently worked as a consultant for Composite Insurance Services, before working for the Australian office of the London Stock Exchange from 1986 to 1995. McCance died in 2008.

Victorian Legislative Assembly
Preceded by Ian McLaren	Member for Bennettswood; 1979–1982	Succeeded by Doug Newton
