= Doug Newton =

Australian politician

Douglas Richard Newton (born 5 July 1950) is an Australian politician.

Newton was born at Ivanhoe to clerk Cecil James Newton and Gwendaline Clare Bowden. He attended La Trobe University, where he received a Bachelor of Science, and later Hawthorn State College for a Diploma of Education. From 1973 to 1975 he worked as a research assistant in the Victorian Forest Commission's fire research section, moving to Melbourne University's Westernport Bay Environmental Study Group from 1975 to 1978. From 1979 to 1982 he taught at Preston East Technical School. On 27 December 1980 he married fellow schoolteacher Helen Frances Eldridge; they had one daughter. A Labor Party member since 1974, he was vice-president of the Ashwood branch and directed the campaign for the federal seat of Chisholm in 1980.

In 1982 Newton was elected to the Victorian Legislative Assembly as the Labor member for Bennettswood; he was defeated in 1985.

Victorian Legislative Assembly
| Preceded by Keith McCance | Member for Bennettswood; 1982–1985 | Succeeded by Roger Pescott |
