= Electoral district of Bennettswood =

Former electoral district of Victoria, Australia

Bennettswood Victoria—Legislative Assembly
- State: Victoria
- Created: 1967
- Abolished: 2002
- Coordinates: 37°51′00″S 145°07′10″E

Electoral district of Bennettswood was an electoral district of the Legislative Assembly in the Australian state of Victoria.

== Members for Bennetswood ==
Member	Party	Term
Ian McLaren	Liberal	1967–1979
Keith McCance	Liberal	1979–1982
Doug Newton	Labor	1982–1985
Roger Pescott	Liberal	1985–1992
Geoff Coleman	Liberal	1992–1999
Ron Wilson	Liberal	1999–2002

McLaren had represented Caulfield 1965–1967.
