= Electoral district of Syndal =

Former state electoral district of Victoria

Coordinates: 37°52′S 145°09′E

Syndal Victoria—Legislative Assembly
- State: Victoria
- Created: 1967
- Abolished: 1992
- Namesake: Suburb of Syndal
- Demographic: Metropolitan

Electoral district of Syndal was an electoral district of the Legislative Assembly in the Australian state of Victoria.

== Members ==
Member	Party	Term
Ray Wiltshire	Liberal	1967–1976
Geoff Coleman	Liberal	1976–1982
David Gray	Labor	1982–1985
Geoff Coleman	Liberal	1985–1992
