= Geoff Coleman =

Australian politician

Charles Geoffrey "Geoff" Coleman (born 1 October 1938) is a former Australian politician.

== Early life ==
Coleman was born in Melbourne. He was a livestock and real estate agent before entering parliament.

== Political career ==
In 1976 he was elected to the Victorian Legislative Assembly as the Liberal member for Syndal. Defeated in 1982, he returned in 1985 and was appointed Shadow Minister for Natural Resources in 1990. In 1992 his seat was abolished and he moved to the seat of Bennettswood. With the Coalition's victory in that election, Coleman was appointed Minister for Natural Resources, serving until 1996. He retired from parliament in 1999.

Victorian Legislative Assembly
Preceded by Ray Wiltshire	Member for Syndal; 1976–1982	Succeeded by David Gray
Preceded by David Gray	Member for Syndal; 1985–1992	Abolished
Preceded by Roger Pescott	Member for Bennettswood; 1992–1999	Succeeded by Ron Wilson
