= Electoral results for the district of Polwarth =

Victoria, Australia, district election results

This is a list of electoral results for the Electoral district of Polwarth in Victorian state elections.

== Members for Polwarth ==
Member	Party	Term
Charles Forrest	Unaligned	1889–1894
Thomas Baker	Unaligned	1894–1897
Charles Forrest	Unaligned	1897–1911
John Johnstone	Comm. Liberal	1911–1917
James McDonald	Nationalist	1917–1929
James McDonald	Economy	1929–1931
James McDonald	United Australia	1931–1933
Allan McDonald	United Australia	1933–1940
Edward Guye	Country	1940–1950
Edward Guye	LCP	1950–1958
Tom Darcy	LCP / Liberal	1958–1970
Cec Burgin	Liberal	1970–1985
Ian Smith	Liberal	1985–1999
Terry Mulder	Liberal	1999–2015
Richard Riordan	Liberal	2015–present

== Election results ==
=== Elections in the 2020s ===
2022 Victorian state election: Polwarth
Party	Candidate	Votes	%	±%
Liberal	Richard Riordan	19,540	42.5	−3.3
Labor	Hutch Hussein	13,484	29.3	−1.4
Greens	Hilary McAllister	7,661	16.7	+6.0
Independent	Denes C. Borsos	2,017	4.4	+4.4
Family First	Hollie Hunter	1,166	2.5	+2.5
Animal Justice	Elisha Atchison	1,101	2.4	−1.3
Justice	Joseph Vincent Remenyi	1,033	2.3	+2.3
Total formal votes		46,002	95.8	+0.6
Informal votes		1,949	3.8	−0.6
Turnout		47,951	90.4	
Two-party-preferred result
Liberal	Richard Riordan	23,823	51.8	−0.4
Labor	Hutch Hussein	22,179	48.2	+0.4
Liberal hold		Swing	−0.4	

=== Elections in the 2010s ===
2018 Victorian state election: Polwarth
Party	Candidate	Votes	%	±%
Liberal	Richard Riordan	20,629	51.14	−4.26
Labor	Douglas Johnston	13,338	33.06	+5.08
Greens	Courtney Gardner	3,949	9.79	−1.24
Animal Justice	Damien Pitts	1,636	4.06	+4.06
Victorian Socialists	Brendan Murphy	788	1.95	+1.95
Total formal votes		40,340	95.00	−1.10
Informal votes		2,122	5.00	+1.10
Turnout		42,462	92.52	−2.36
Two-party-preferred result
Liberal	Richard Riordan	22,360	55.40	−5.24
Labor	Douglas Johnston	17,999	44.60	+5.24
Liberal hold		Swing	−5.24	

2015 Polwarth state by-election
Party	Candidate	Votes	%	±%
Liberal	Richard Riordan	17,760	49.7	−5.7
Greens	Joe Miles	5,689	15.9	+4.9
National	David O'Brien	4,287	12.0	+12.0
Democratic Labour	Carmel Kavanagh	2,900	8.1	+8.1
Sex Party	Meredith Doig	2,135	6.0	+6.0
Country	Melinda Cass	2,039	5.7	+0.1
Christians	Geoff Rogers	574	1.6	+1.6
Independent	Brendan Eckel	373	1.0	+1.0
Total formal votes		35,757	94.8	−1.3
Informal votes		1,948	5.2	+1.3
Turnout		37,705	86.0	(−8.9)
After distribution of preferences
Liberal	Richard Riordan	17,976	50.3	n/a
Greens	Joe Miles	5,829	16.3	n/a
National	David O'Brien	4,409	12.3	n/a
Democratic Labour	Carmel Kavanagh	3,115	8.7	n/a
Sex Party	Meredith Doig	2,246	6.3	n/a
Country	Melinda Cass	2,182	6.1	n/a
Liberal hold		Swing	n/a	

2014 Victorian state election: Polwarth
Party	Candidate	Votes	%	±%
Liberal	Terry Mulder	21,861	55.4	−0.5
Labor	Libby Coker	11,045	28.0	+1.1
Greens	Simon Northeast	4,352	11.0	+2.8
Country Alliance	Philip Edge	2,206	5.6	+1.7
Total formal votes		39,464	96.1	−0.1
Informal votes		1,599	3.9	+0.1
Turnout		41,063	94.9	+1.8
Two-party-preferred result
Liberal	Terry Mulder	23,944	60.6	−3.2
Labor	Libby Coker	15,541	39.4	+3.2
Liberal hold		Swing	−3.2	

2010 Victorian state election: Polwarth
Party	Candidate	Votes	%	±%
Liberal	Terry Mulder	21,245	55.31	+1.79
Labor	Brian Crook	10,432	27.16	−1.76
Greens	Natalie Atherden	3,235	8.42	−1.19
Country Alliance	Garry Kerr	1,502	3.91	+3.91
Family First	John Modra	1,211	3.15	−1.11
Independent	Grant Beale	784	2.04	+2.04
Total formal votes		38,409	96.15	−0.34
Informal votes		1,539	3.85	+0.34
Turnout		39,948	94.94	+1.00
Two-party-preferred result
Liberal	Terry Mulder	24,351	63.29	+2.60
Labor	Brian Crook	14,127	36.71	−2.60
Liberal hold		Swing	+2.60	

=== Elections in the 2000s ===
2006 Victorian state election: Polwarth
Party	Candidate	Votes	%	±%
Liberal	Terry Mulder	19,598	53.5	+5.2
Labor	Darren Cheeseman	10,665	29.1	−1.9
Greens	Natalie Atherden	3,520	9.6	+0.8
Family First	Trevor Pearce	1,561	4.3	+4.3
National	Charles Neal	1,276	3.5	−6.8
Total formal votes		36,620	96.5	+0.3
Informal votes		1,334	3.5	−0.3
Turnout		37,954	93.9	
Two-party-preferred result
Liberal	Terry Mulder	22,220	60.7	+1.2
Labor	Darren Cheeseman	14,394	39.3	−1.2
Liberal hold		Swing	+1.2	

2002 Victorian state election: Polwarth
Party	Candidate	Votes	%	±%
Liberal	Terry Mulder	17,342	48.3	+5.0
Labor	Steve Gartland	11,141	31.0	+8.3
National	Doug Chant	3,700	10.3	−6.6
Greens	Natalie Atherden	3,163	8.8	+5.2
Independent	Andrew Mitchell	570	1.6	+1.6
Total formal votes		35,916	96.2	−1.5
Informal votes		1,416	3.8	+1.5
Turnout		37,332	95.3	
Two-party-preferred result
Liberal	Terry Mulder	21,413	59.5	−3.5
Labor	Steve Gartland	14,557	40.5	+3.5
Liberal hold		Swing	−3.5	

=== Elections in the 1990s ===
1999 Victorian state election: Polwarth
Party	Candidate	Votes	%	±%
Liberal	Terry Mulder	12,668	41.0	−10.0
Labor	Steve Gartland	7,393	23.9	−4.5
National	Paul Couch	5,116	16.6	+16.6
Independent	Brian Crook	4,574	14.8	−3.8
Greens	Sally-Anne Brown	1,161	3.8	+3.8
Total formal votes		30,912	97.8	−0.3
Informal votes		686	2.2	+0.3
Turnout		31,598	95.1	
Two-party-preferred result
Liberal	Terry Mulder	18,675	60.4	+2.3
Labor	Steve Gartland	12,237	39.6	−2.3
Liberal hold		Swing	+2.3	

1996 Victorian state election: Polwarth
Party	Candidate	Votes	%	±%
Liberal	Ian Smith	15,631	50.9	−14.9
Labor	Fran Lehmann	8,715	28.4	−5.7
Independent	Brian Crook	5,719	18.6	+18.6
Natural Law	Leah Rust	616	2.0	+2.0
Total formal votes		30,681	98.1	+1.3
Informal votes		582	1.9	−1.3
Turnout		31,263	95.4	
Two-party-preferred result
Liberal	Ian Smith	17,747	58.1	−7.7
Labor	Fran Lehmann	12,779	41.9	+7.7
Liberal hold		Swing	−7.7	

1992 Victorian state election: Polwarth
Party	Candidate	Votes	%	±%
Liberal	Ian Smith	19,764	65.8	+12.7
Labor	Fran Lehmann	10,252	34.2	+1.7
Total formal votes		30,016	96.9	−1.0
Informal votes		971	3.1	+1.0
Turnout		30,987	95.9	
Liberal hold		Swing	+1.7	

=== Elections in the 1980s ===
1988 Victorian state election: Polwarth
Party	Candidate	Votes	%	±%
Liberal	Ian Smith	15,716	54.04	−0.42
Labor	Paul Kennelly	8,799	30.26	+0.89
National	Michael Evans	4,565	15.70	−0.47
Total formal votes		29,080	97.88	−0.56
Informal votes		630	2.12	+0.56
Turnout		29,710	94.64	−1.34
Two-party-preferred result
Liberal	Ian Smith	19,213	66.07	−1.60
Labor	Paul Kennelly	9,867	33.93	+1.60
Liberal hold		Swing	−1.60	

1985 Victorian state election: Polwarth
Party	Candidate	Votes	%	±%
Liberal	Ian Smith	16,907	54.5	−6.7
Labor	Jeffery Rootes	8,401	29.4	−1.0
National	David Seymour	4,626	16.2	+16.2
Total formal votes		28,608	98.4	
Informal votes		453	1.6	
Turnout		29,061	96.0	
Two-party-preferred result
Liberal	Ian Smith	19,539	68.3	+3.3
Labor	Jeffery Rootes	9,069	31.7	−3.3
Liberal hold		Swing	+3.3	

1982 Victorian state election: Polwarth
Party	Candidate	Votes	%	±%
Liberal	Cec Burgin	15,241	63.1	+9.3
Labor	Angus McIvor	6,734	27.9	+2.2
Democrats	Douglas Mason	2,183	9.0	+3.7
Total formal votes		24,158	98.6	+0.5
Informal votes		350	1.4	−0.5
Turnout		24,508	95.8	−0.2
Two-party-preferred result
Liberal	Cec Burgin	16,169	66.9	−1.8
Labor	Angus McIvor	7,989	33.1	+1.8
Liberal hold		Swing	−1.8	

=== Elections in the 1970s ===
1979 Victorian state election: Polwarth
Party	Candidate	Votes	%	±%
Liberal	Cec Burgin	12,751	53.8	−1.2
Labor	Ronald Wheaton	6,084	25.7	+4.4
National	Gilbert Anderson	3,593	15.2	−3.7
Democrats	Kathleen May	1,254	5.3	+5.3
Total formal votes		23,682	98.1	−0.3
Informal votes		467	1.9	+0.3
Turnout		24,149	96.0	+0.2
Two-party-preferred result
Liberal	Cec Burgin	16,264	68.7	−7.9
Labor	Ronald Wheaton	7,418	31.3	+7.9
Liberal hold		Swing	−7.9	

1976 Victorian state election: Polwarth
Party	Candidate	Votes	%	±%
Liberal	Cec Burgin	12,976	55.0	+0.6
Labor	Ronald Wheaton	5,018	21.3	−0.9
National	Frederick Sadler	4,455	18.9	+4.1
Democratic Labor	Thomas Fleming	1,132	4.8	−3.8
Total formal votes		23,581	98.4	
Informal votes		383	1.6	
Turnout		23,964	95.8	
Two-party-preferred result
Liberal	Cec Burgin	18,059	76.6	+2.3
Labor	Ronald Wheaton	5,522	23.4	−2.3
Liberal hold		Swing	+2.3	

1973 Victorian state election: Polwarth
Party	Candidate	Votes	%	±%
Liberal	Cec Burgin	10,162	53.7	+13.5
Labor	Bill Pargeter	4,223	22.3	+0.8
Country	John Younis	3,123	16.5	−11.6
Democratic Labor	Michael Dwyer	1,403	7.4	−2.8
Total formal votes		18,911	98.3	+0.2
Informal votes		311	1.7	−0.2
Turnout		19,242	96.4	−0.5
Two-party-preferred result
Liberal	Cec Burgin	14,166	74.9	+24.5
Labor	Bill Pargeter	4,745	25.1	+25.1
Liberal hold		Swing	+24.5	

1970 Victorian state election: Polwarth
Party	Candidate	Votes	%	±%
Liberal	Cec Burgin	6,991	40.2	−8.6
Country	Douglas Wade	4,891	28.1	+9.2
Labor	John O'Brien	3,746	21.5	+1.7
Democratic Labor	Leonard Eyre	1,777	10.2	−2.4
Total formal votes		17,405	98.1	+0.4
Informal votes		340	1.9	−0.4
Turnout		17,745	96.9	+0.1
Two-party-preferred result
Liberal	Cec Burgin	10,213	58.7	−18.9
Labor	John O'Brien	7,192	41.3	+18.9
Two-candidate-preferred result
Liberal	Cec Burgin	8,771	50.4	−27.2
Country	Douglas Wade	8,634	49.6	+49.6
Liberal hold		Swing	N/A	

=== Elections in the 1960s ===
1967 Victorian state election: Polwarth
Party	Candidate	Votes	%	±%
Liberal	Tom Darcy	8,201	48.8	−11.7
Labor	Alfred Cartwright	3,320	19.8	−4.3
Country	John McCue	3,168	18.9	+18.9
Democratic Labor	Leonard Eyre	2,112	12.6	−2.8
Total formal votes		16,801	97.7	
Informal votes		390	2.3	
Turnout		17,191	96.8	
Two-party-preferred result
Liberal	Tom Darcy	13,031	77.6	+3.9
Labor	Alfred Cartwright	3,770	22.4	−3.9
Liberal hold		Swing	+3.9	

1964 Victorian state election: Polwarth
Party	Candidate	Votes	%	±%
Liberal and Country	Tom Darcy	15,128	59.9	+17.2
Labor	Edwin Morris	6,522	25.8	−0.2
Democratic Labor	Thomas Fleming	3,594	14.2	−1.3
Total formal votes		25,244	98.7	+0.3
Informal votes		322	1.3	−0.3
Turnout		25,566	96.1	+0.4
Two-party-preferred result
Liberal and Country	Tom Darcy	18,184	72.0	+0.4
Labor	Edwin Morris	7,060	28.0	−0.4
Liberal and Country hold		Swing	+0.4	

1961 Victorian state election: Polwarth
Party	Candidate	Votes	%	±%
Liberal and Country	Tom Darcy	9,983	42.7	+2.2
Labor	Edwin Morris	6,066	26.0	+2.3
Country	Lloyd Kidman	3,673	15.7	−7.7
Democratic Labor	Alan Bruce	3,630	15.5	+3.1
Total formal votes		23,352	98.4	−0.5
Informal votes		380	1.6	+0.5
Turnout		23,732	95.7	0.0
Two-party-preferred result
Liberal and Country	Tom Darcy	16,718	71.6	−1.0
Labor	Edwin Morris	6,634	28.4	+1.0
Liberal and Country hold		Swing	−1.0	

=== Elections in the 1950s ===
1958 Victorian state election: Polwarth
Party	Candidate	Votes	%	±%
Liberal and Country	Tom Darcy	8,807	40.5	
Labor	William King	5,160	23.7	
Country	Ronald McDonough	5,086	23.4	
Democratic Labor	Michael Finlay	2,702	12.4	
Total formal votes		21,755	98.9	
Informal votes		249	1.1	
Turnout		22,004	95.7	
Two-party-preferred result
Liberal and Country	Tom Darcy	15,793	72.6	
Labor	William King	5,962	27.4	
Liberal and Country hold		Swing		

1955 Victorian state election: Polwarth
Party	Candidate	Votes	%	±%
Liberal and Country	Edward Guye	10,543	54.6	
Labor	Phillip Denning	4,817	24.9	
Country	Ronald Harris	3,963	20.5	
Total formal votes		19,323	98.9	
Informal votes		220	1.1	
Turnout		19,543	95.8	
Two-party-preferred result
Liberal and Country	Edward Guye	14,110	73.0	
Labor	Phillip Denning	5,213	27.0	
Liberal and Country hold		Swing		

1952 Victorian state election: Polwarth
Party	Candidate	Votes	%	±%
Liberal and Country	Edward Guye	8,340	57.6	0.0
Labor	Clair Larson	6,142	42.4	+9.9
Total formal votes		14,482	99.0	−0.5
Informal votes		146	1.0	+0.5
Turnout		14,628	95.3	−0.6
Liberal and Country hold		Swing	−8.9	

1950 Victorian state election: Polwarth
Party	Candidate	Votes	%	±%
Liberal and Country	Edward Guye	8,094	57.6	−9.3
Labor	Edwin Morris	4,575	32.5	−0.6
Country	John Horne	1,391	9.9	+9.9
Total formal votes		14,060	99.5	+0.1
Informal votes		68	0.5	−0.1
Turnout		14,128	95.9	+0.8
Two-party-preferred result
Liberal and Country	Edward Guye	9,346	66.5	−0.4
Labor	Edwin Morris	4,714	33.5	+0.4
Liberal and Country hold		Swing	−0.4	

=== Elections in the 1940s ===
1947 Victorian state election: Polwarth
Party	Candidate	Votes	%	±%
Country	Edward Guye	9,028	66.9	+4.3
Labor	Edwin Morris	4,462	33.1	−4.3
Total formal votes		13,490	99.4	+0.3
Informal votes		79	0.6	−0.3
Turnout		13,569	95.1	+5.7
Country hold		Swing	+4.3	

1945 Victorian state election: Polwarth
Party	Candidate	Votes	%	±%
Country	Edward Guye	7,625	62.6	
Labor	Thomas Carmody	4,555	37.4	
Total formal votes		12,180	99.1	
Informal votes		111	0.9	
Turnout		12,291	89.4	
Country hold		Swing		

1943 Victorian state election: Polwarth
Party	Candidate	Votes	%	±%
Country	Edward Guye	6,911	66.6	+25.0
Labor	Arthur Jackson	3,466	33.4	+33.4
Total formal votes		10,377	99.4	+0.3
Informal votes		57	0.6	−0.3
Turnout		10,434	87.8	−6.6
Country gain from United Australia		Swing	N/A	

1940 Polwarth state by-election
Party	Candidate	Votes	%	±%
United Australia	Keith McGarvie	3,955	36.2	−22.2
Country	Edward Guye	3,521	32.2	−9.4
Labor	Arthur Jackson	3,445	31.5	+31.5
Total formal votes		10,921	99.5	+0.4
Informal votes		53	0.5	−0.4
Turnout		10,974	90.3	−4.1
Two-candidate-preferred result
Country	Edward Guye	6,395	58.5	+16.9
United Australia	Keith McGarvie	4,526	41.5	−16.9
Country gain from United Australia		Swing	+16.9	

1940 Victorian state election: Polwarth
Party	Candidate	Votes	%	±%
United Australia	Allan McDonald	6,494	58.4	+2.6
Country	Leonard Parker	4,623	41.6	−2.6
Total formal votes		11,117	99.1	−0.3
Informal votes		98	0.9	+0.3
Turnout		11,215	94.4	−0.8
United Australia hold		Swing	+2.6	

=== Elections in the 1930s ===
1937 Victorian state election: Polwarth
Party	Candidate	Votes	%	±%
United Australia	Allan McDonald	6,220	55.8	−44.2
Country	Leonard Parker	4,923	44.2	+44.2
Total formal votes		11,143	99.4	
Informal votes		63	0.6	
Turnout		11,206	95.2	
United Australia hold		Swing	N/A	

1935 Victorian state election: Polwarth
Party	Candidate	Votes	%	±%
United Australia	Allan McDonald	unopposed		
United Australia hold		Swing		

1933 Polwarth state by-election
Party	Candidate	Votes	%	±%
United Australia	Allan McDonald	4,343	41.4	−25.0
Labor	John Dedman	3,409	32.5	+32.5
Country	George Howey	2,728	26.0	−7.6
Total formal votes		10,480	99.4	+1.1
Informal votes		62	0.6	−1.1
Turnout		10,542	92.1	−2.5
Two-party-preferred result
United Australia	Allan McDonald	6,388	61.0	−5.4
Labor	John Dedman	4,092	39.0	+39.0
United Australia hold		Swing	N/A	

1932 Victorian state election: Polwarth
Party	Candidate	Votes	%	±%
United Australia	James McDonald	6,981	66.4	+11.5
Country	Leonard Parker	3,535	33.6	+33.6
Total formal votes		10,516	98.3	−1.5
Informal votes		183	1.7	+1.5
Turnout		10,699	94.6	−0.5
United Australia hold		Swing	N/A	

=== Elections in the 1920s ===
1929 Victorian state election: Polwarth
Party	Candidate	Votes	%	±%
Nationalist	James McDonald	5,843	54.9	−45.1
Labor	Phillip Hill	4,800	45.1	+45.1
Total formal votes		10,643	99.8	
Informal votes		23	0.2	
Turnout		10,666	95.1	
Nationalist hold		Swing	N/A	

1927 Victorian state election: Polwarth
Party	Candidate	Votes	%	±%
Nationalist	James McDonald	unopposed		
Nationalist hold		Swing		

1924 Victorian state election: Polwarth
Party	Candidate	Votes	%	±%
Nationalist	James McDonald	4,112	56.1	−3.2
Labor	William Nichol	3,217	43.9	+3.2
Total formal votes		7,329	99.7	+0.3
Informal votes		26	0.3	−0.3
Turnout		7,355	64.0	−0.6
Nationalist hold		Swing	−3.2	

1921 Victorian state election: Polwarth
Party	Candidate	Votes	%	±%
Nationalist	James McDonald	4,311	59.3	+16.2
Labor	John Linahan	2,955	40.7	+4.7
Total formal votes		7,266	99.4	+3.7
Informal votes		43	0.6	−3.7
Turnout		7,309	64.6	−7.5
Nationalist hold		Swing	+2.3	

1920 Victorian state election: Polwarth
Party	Candidate	Votes	%	±%
Nationalist	James McDonald	3,259	43.1	−22.3
Labor	John Linahan	2,729	36.0	+1.4
Victorian Farmers	John Black	1,583	20.9	+20.9
Total formal votes		7,571	95.7	−1.9
Informal votes		342	4.3	+1.9
Turnout		7,913	72.1	+9.1
Two-party-preferred result
Nationalist	James McDonald	4,313	57.0	−1.9
Labor	John Linahan	3,258	43.0	+1.9
Nationalist hold		Swing	−1.9	

=== Elections in the 1910s ===
1917 Victorian state election: Polwarth
Party	Candidate	Votes	%	±%
Nationalist	James McDonald	2,964	44.1	
Labor	Edward Smith	2,327	34.6	−2.4
Nationalist	John Hancock	1,128	16.8	
Nationalist	Edgar Churches	305	4.5	
Total formal votes		6,724	97.6	+0.2
Informal votes		169	2.4	−0.2
Turnout		6,893	63.0	−1.4
Two-party-preferred result
Nationalist	James McDonald	3,963	58.9	−4.1
Labor	Edward Smith	2,761	41.1	+4.1
Nationalist hold		Swing	−4.1	

1917 Polwarth state by-election
Party	Candidate	Votes	%	±%
Nationalist	James McDonald	2,071	56.0	N/A
Nationalist	Charles Meredith	1,629	44.0	N/A
Total formal votes		3,700	98.3	+0.9
Informal votes		63	1.7	−0.9
Turnout		3,763	33.1	−31.3
Nationalist hold		Swing	N/A	

1914 Victorian state election: Polwarth
Party	Candidate	Votes	%	±%
Liberal	John Johnstone	4,389	63.0	+0.5
Labor	John Considine	2,576	37.0	−0.5
Total formal votes		6,965	97.4	−1.9
Informal votes		189	2.6	+1.9
Turnout		7,154	64.4	−12.4
Liberal hold		Swing	+0.5	

1911 Victorian state election: Polwarth
Party	Candidate	Votes	%	±%
Liberal	John Johnstone	5,046	62.5	+3.2
Labor	John McDonald	3,021	37.5	+5.9
Total formal votes		8,067	99.3	−0.4
Informal votes		54	0.7	+0.4
Turnout		8,121	76.8	+18.7
Liberal hold		Swing	N/A	
