= Electoral results for the district of Warrnambool =

Victoria, Australia, district election results

This is a list of electoral results for the electoral district of Warrnambool in Victorian state elections.

== Members for Warrnambool ==
First incarnation (1856–1955)
Member	Party	Term
George Horne		1856–1861
Thomas Manifold		1861
John Wood		1861–1864
John Dane		1864–1865
William Plummer		1866–1874
Sir James McCulloch		1874–1878
James Francis		1878–1884
John Murray		1884–1916
James Deany	Nationalist/Economy Party	1916–1927
Henry Bailey	Labor	1927–1932
James Fairbairn	United Australia	1932–1933
Keith McGarvie	United Australia	1933–1935
Henry Bailey	Country	1935–1950
Sir Ronald Mack	Liberal	1950–1952
Malcolm Gladman	Labor	1952–1955
Second incarnation (1967–2002)
Ian Smith	Liberal	1967–1983
Adam Kempton	Liberal	1983–1985
John McGrath	National	1985–1999
John Vogels	Liberal	1999–2002

== Election results ==
=== Elections in the 1990s ===
1999 Victorian state election: Warrnambool
Party	Candidate	Votes	%	±%
Liberal	John Vogels	12,739	40.2	+40.2
Labor	Roy Reekie	9,993	31.5	+2.9
National	Greg Walsh	5,550	17.5	−40.3
Independent	Maggie Lindop	1,864	5.9	−6.7
Greens	Gillian Blair	740	2.3	+2.3
Independent	Robert O'Brien	435	1.4	+1.4
Reform	Barry Wilson	379	1.2	+1.2
Total formal votes		31,700	97.1	−1.1
Informal votes		962	2.9	+1.1
Turnout		32,662	95.4	
Two-party-preferred result
Liberal	John Vogels	18,682	58.9	+58.9
Labor	Roy Reekie	13,018	41.1	+4.9
Liberal gain from National		Swing	N/A	

1996 Victorian state election: Warrnambool
Party	Candidate	Votes	%	±%
National	John McGrath	18,357	57.8	−18.0
Labor	Peter Steele	9,071	28.6	+4.4
Independent	Maggie Lindop	3,986	12.6	+12.6
Natural Law	Lee Kenos	320	1.0	+1.0
Total formal votes		31,734	98.2	+0.2
Informal votes		595	1.8	−0.2
Turnout		32,329	95.9	
Two-party-preferred result
National	John McGrath	20,188	63.8	−12.0
Labor	Peter Steele	11,448	36.2	+12.0
National hold		Swing	−12.0	

1992 Victorian state election: Warrnambool
Party	Candidate	Votes	%	±%
National	John McGrath	23,400	75.8	+25.8
Labor	William Thompson	7,454	24.2	+2.5
Total formal votes		30,854	97.9	−0.6
Informal votes		649	2.1	+0.6
Turnout		31,503	97.1	
National hold		Swing	−1.4	

=== Elections in the 1980s ===
1988 Victorian state election: Warrnambool
Party	Candidate	Votes	%	±%
National	John McGrath	14,838	52.44	+20.25
Liberal	Eda Ritchie	7,244	25.60	−15.84
Labor	Peter Steele	6,213	21.96	−4.41
Total formal votes		28,295	98.62	−0.35
Informal votes		397	1.38	+0.35
Turnout		28,692	94.94	+0.21
Two-party-preferred result
National	John McGrath	21,866	77.28	
Labor	Peter Steele	6,429	22.72	
National hold		Swing		

- The two party preferred vote was not counted between the National and Liberal candidates for Warrnambool.

1985 Victorian state election: Warrnambool
Party	Candidate	Votes	%	±%
Liberal	Adam Kempton	11,417	41.4	−17.7
National	John McGrath	8,871	32.2	+32.2
Labor	Peter Cox	7,265	26.4	−8.6
Total formal votes		27,553	99.0	
Informal votes		288	1.0	
Turnout		27,841	94.7	
Two-party-preferred result
National	John McGrath	18,130	65.8	+0.7
Labor	Peter Cox	9,423	34.2	−0.7
Two-candidate-preferred result
National	John McGrath	15,578	56.5	+56.5
Liberal	Adam Kempton	11,975	43.5	−21.6
National gain from Liberal		Swing	N/A	

1983 Warrnambool state by-election
Party	Candidate	Votes	%	±%
National	John McGrath	9,114	37.2	+37.2
Liberal	Adam Kempton	7,797	31.8	−27.1
Labor	Peter Cox	7,595	31.0	−4.3
Total formal votes		24,506	99.2	+0.6
Informal votes		208	0.8	−0.6
Turnout		24,714	91.6	−3.6
Two-candidate-preferred result
Liberal	Adam Kempton	13,676	55.8	−5.5
National	John McGrath	10,830	44.2	+5.5
Liberal hold		Swing	N/A	

1982 Victorian state election: Warrnambool
Party	Candidate	Votes	%	±%
Liberal	Ian Smith	14,640	58.9	+7.8
Labor	Paul Martin	8,780	35.3	+2.1
Democrats	Kathleen May	1,455	5.9	+5.9
Total formal votes		24,875	98.6	+0.8
Informal votes		353	1.4	−0.8
Turnout		25,228	95.2	−0.1
Two-party-preferred result
Liberal	Ian Smith	15,258	61.3	−1.1
Labor	Paul Martin	9,617	38.7	+1.1
Liberal hold		Swing	−1.1	

=== Elections in the 1970s ===
1979 Victorian state election: Warrnambool
Party	Candidate	Votes	%	±%
Liberal	Ian Smith	12,258	51.1	+4.3
Labor	Vernon Delaney	7,975	33.2	+2.0
National	Ian Symons	3,051	12.7	−2.4
Independent	Gwenneth Trayling	708	3.0	+3.0
Total formal votes		23,992	97.8	−0.9
Informal votes		536	2.2	+0.9
Turnout		24,528	95.3	+0.1
Two-party-preferred result
Liberal	Ian Smith	14,983	62.4	−2.8
Labor	Vernon Delaney	9,009	37.6	+2.8
Liberal hold		Swing	−2.8	

1976 Victorian state election: Warrnambool
Party	Candidate	Votes	%	±%
Liberal	Ian Smith	11,036	46.8	+6.5
Labor	Vernon Delaney	7,365	31.2	−1.6
National	Murray Lane	3,556	15.1	−0.1
Democratic Labor	Peter Burke	1,643	7.0	−4.8
Total formal votes		23,600	98.7	
Informal votes		308	1.3	
Turnout		23,908	95.2	
Two-party-preferred result
Liberal	Ian Smith	15,387	65.2	+2.1
Labor	Vernon Delaney	8,213	34.8	−2.1
Liberal hold		Swing	+2.1	

1973 Victorian state election: Warrnambool
Party	Candidate	Votes	%	±%
Liberal	Ian Smith	8,796	43.7	+7.0
Labor	Ken Sanders	5,702	28.4	−0.2
Country	Harold Stephenson	3,033	15.1	+3.3
Democratic Labor	Francis Hasell	2,583	12.8	−6.2
Total formal votes		20,114	98.4	+0.2
Informal votes		320	1.6	−0.2
Turnout		20,434	96.3	−0.4
Two-party-preferred result
Liberal	Ian Smith	13,815	68.7	+9.9
Labor	Ken Sanders	6,299	31.7	−9.9
Liberal hold		Swing	+9.9	

1970 Victorian state election: Warrnambool
Party	Candidate	Votes	%	±%
Liberal	Ian Smith	6,650	36.7	+8.1
Labor	Donald Grossman	5,181	28.6	+3.7
Democratic Labor	Francis Hasell	3,448	19.0	−2.6
Country	Cyril Boyle	2,138	11.8	−3.2
Defence of Government Schools	Robert McCosh	711	3.9	+3.9
Total formal votes		18,128	98.2	+0.2
Informal votes		334	1.8	−0.2
Turnout		18,462	96.7	0.0
Two-party-preferred result
Liberal	Ian Smith	10,652	58.8	−10.6
Labor	Donald Grossman	7,476	41.2	+10.6
Liberal hold		Swing	−10.6	

=== Elections in the 1960s ===
1967 Victorian state election: Warrnambool
Party	Candidate	Votes	%	±%
Liberal	Ian Smith	5,064	28.6	−13.9
Labor	Vincent Ayres	4,404	24.9	−2.3
Democratic Labor	Patrick Bourke	3,824	21.6	−0.2
Country	Cyril Boyle	2,655	15.0	+6.6
Independent	George Gibbs	1,759	9.9	+9.9
Total formal votes		17,706	98.0	
Informal votes		352	2.0	
Turnout		18,058	96.7	
Two-party-preferred result
Liberal	Ian Smith	12,285	69.4	+0.5
Labor	Vincent Ayres	5,421	30.6	−0.5
Liberal hold		Swing	+0.5	

=== Elections in the 1950s ===
1952 Victorian state election: Warrnambool
Party	Candidate	Votes	%	±%
Labor	Malcolm Gladman	7,256	51.1	+9.3
Liberal and Country	Ronald Mack	6,957	48.9	+14.8
Total formal votes		14,213	99.4	0.0
Informal votes		87	0.6	0.0
Turnout		14,300	96.1	−0.3
Labor gain from Liberal and Country		Swing	+2.1	

1950 Victorian state election: Warrnambool
Party	Candidate	Votes	%	±%
Labor	James Farrell	5,804	41.8	+1.2
Liberal and Country	Ronald Mack	4,745	34.1	+34.1
Country	Henry Bailey	3,349	24.1	−35.3
Total formal votes		13,898	99.4	0.0
Informal votes		89	0.6	0.0
Turnout		13,987	96.4	+0.4
Two-party-preferred result
Liberal and Country	Ronald Mack	7,102	51.1	+51.1
Labor	James Farrell	6,796	48.9	+8.3
Liberal and Country gain from Country		Swing	N/A	

=== Elections in the 1940s ===
1947 Victorian state election: Warrnambool
Party	Candidate	Votes	%	±%
Country	Henry Bailey	8,204	59.4	+7.8
Labor	Fred Reid	5,607	40.6	−7.8
Total formal votes		13,811	99.4	+0.6
Informal votes		80	0.6	−0.6
Turnout		13,891	96.0	+6.1
Country hold		Swing	+7.8	

1945 Victorian state election: Warrnambool
Party	Candidate	Votes	%	±%
Country	Henry Bailey	6,358	51.6	
Labor	James Farrell	5,973	48.4	
Total formal votes		12,331	98.8	
Informal votes		143	1.2	
Turnout		12,474	89.9	
Country hold		Swing		

1943 Victorian state election: Warrnambool
Party	Candidate	Votes	%	±%
Country	Henry Bailey	6,725	62.2	−1.6
Labor	John McDonald	4,090	37.8	+37.8
Total formal votes		10,815	97.2	−1.7
Informal votes		313	2.8	+1.7
Turnout		11,128	88.3	−6.7
Country hold		Swing	N/A	

1940 Victorian state election: Warrnambool
Party	Candidate	Votes	%	±%
Country	Henry Bailey	7,557	63.8	+5.8
United Australia	Keith McGarvie	4,284	36.2	−5.8
Total formal votes		11,841	98.9	−0.4
Informal votes		137	1.1	+0.4
Turnout		11,978	95.0	−0.9
Country hold		Swing	+5.8	

=== Elections in the 1930s ===
1937 Victorian state election: Warrnambool
Party	Candidate	Votes	%	±%
Country	Henry Bailey	6,795	58.0	+18.0
United Australia	Keith McGarvie	4,928	42.0	+5.9
Total formal votes		11,723	99.3	0.0
Informal votes		82	0.7	0.0
Turnout		11,805	95.9	+0.6
Country hold		Swing	+0.6	

1935 Victorian state election: Warrnambool
Party	Candidate	Votes	%	±%
Country	Henry Bailey	4,649	40.0	+40.0
United Australia	Keith McGarvie	4,188	36.1	−19.0
Labor	Frederick Gill	2,775	23.9	+23.9
Total formal votes		11,612	99.3	−0.1
Informal votes		81	0.7	+0.1
Turnout		11,693	96.5	0.0
Two-party-preferred result
Country	Henry Bailey	6,671	57.4	+57.4
United Australia	Keith McGarvie	4,941	42.6	−12.5
Country gain from United Australia		Swing	N/A	

1933 Warrnambool state by-election
Party	Candidate	Votes	%	±%
Independent	Henry Bailey	3,820	35.2	−9.7
United Australia	Keith McGarvie	3,061	28.2	−26.9
Country	Robert Glasgow	2,451	22.6	+22.6
Labor	Frederick Gill	1,518	14.0	+14.0
Total formal votes		10,850	98.9	−0.5
Informal votes		117	1.1	+0.5
Turnout		10,967	92.5	−4.0
Two-candidate-preferred result
United Australia	Keith McGarvie	5,589	51.5	−3.6
Independent	Henry Bailey	5,261	48.5	+48.5
United Australia hold		Swing	N/A	

1932 Victorian state election: Warrnambool
Party	Candidate	Votes	%	±%
United Australia	James Fairbairn	6,060	55.1	+55.1
Premiers' Plan Labor	Henry Bailey	4,930	44.9	+44.9
Total formal votes		10,990	99.4	+0.4
Informal votes		62	0.6	−0.4
Turnout		11,052	96.5	+1.1
United Australia gain from Labor		Swing	N/A	

=== Elections in the 1920s ===
1929 Victorian state election: Warrnambool
Party	Candidate	Votes	%	±%
Labor	Henry Bailey	6,146	62.3	+9.2
Australian Liberal	William Downing	3,726	37.7	+32.7
Total formal votes		9,872	99.0	−0.1
Informal votes		95	1.0	+0.1
Turnout		9,967	95.4	+1.3
Labor hold		Swing	N/A	

1927 Victorian state election: Warrnambool
Party	Candidate	Votes	%	±%
Labor	Henry Bailey	4,947	53.1	
Nationalist	James Swan	3,904	41.9	
Australian Liberal	William Downing	466	5.0	
Total formal votes		9,317	99.1	
Informal votes		83	0.9	
Turnout		9,400	94.1	
Two-party-preferred result
Labor	Henry Bailey		53.6	
Nationalist	James Swan		46.4	
Labor gain from Nationalist		Swing		

- Two party preferred vote was estimated.

1924 Victorian state election: Warrnambool
Party	Candidate	Votes	%	±%
Nationalist	James Deany	3,188	50.1	−10.1
Independent Labor	Harold Lawson	2,288	36.0	+36.0
Labor	Laurence Bolton	888	13.9	−25.9
Total formal votes		6,364	99.3	−0.2
Informal votes		47	0.7	+0.2
Turnout		6,411	68.1	+2.7
Two-party-preferred result
Nationalist	James Deany		52.4	−7.8
Independent Labor	Harold Lawson		47.6	+47.6
Nationalist hold		Swing	N/A	

- Two candidate preferred vote was estimated.

1921 Victorian state election: Warrnambool
Party	Candidate	Votes	%	±%
Nationalist	James Deany	3,541	60.2	+18.6
Labor	Fred Katz	2,336	39.8	+2.0
Total formal votes		5,877	99.5	+4.9
Informal votes		27	0.5	−4.9
Turnout		5,904	65.4	−6.9
Nationalist hold		Swing	+4.3	

1920 Victorian state election: Warrnambool
Party	Candidate	Votes	%	±%
Nationalist	James Deany	2,661	41.6	−21.4
Labor	George Heather	2,415	37.8	+0.8
Victorian Farmers	John Clark	1,318	20.6	+20.6
Total formal votes		6,394	94.6	−3.1
Informal votes		364	5.4	+3.1
Turnout		6,758	72.3	+9.9
Two-party-preferred result
Nationalist	James Deany	3,575	55.9	−7.1
Labor	George Heather	2,819	44.1	+7.1
Nationalist hold		Swing	−7.1	

=== Elections in the 1910s ===
1917 Victorian state election: Warrnambool
Party	Candidate	Votes	%	±%
Nationalist	James Deany	3,489	63.0	+0.1
Labor	James McMeel	2,046	37.0	−0.1
Total formal votes		5,535	97.7	+0.5
Informal votes		128	2.3	−0.5
Turnout		5,663	62.4	+8.1
Nationalist hold		Swing	+0.1	

1916 Warrnambool state by-election
Party	Candidate	Votes	%	±%
Labor	Alfred Pearce	2,152	35.5	−1.6
Liberal	Desmond Dunne	1,566	25.8	N/A
Liberal	James Deany	1,190	19.6	N/A
Liberal	Percy Webb	1,155	19.0	N/A
Total formal votes		6,063	N/A	N/A
Informal votes		N/A	N/A	N/A
Turnout		N/A	N/A	N/A
Two-party-preferred result
Liberal	James Deany	3,574	58.9	−4.0
Labor	Alfred Pearce	2,490	41.1	+4.0
Liberal hold		Swing	−4.0	

1914 Victorian state election: Warrnambool
Party	Candidate	Votes	%	±%
Liberal	John Murray	3,715	62.9	−3.9
Labor	Alfred Pearce	2,195	37.1	+3.9
Total formal votes		5,910	97.2	−2.1
Informal votes		173	2.8	+2.1
Turnout		6,083	54.3	−17.8
Liberal hold		Swing	−3.9	

1911 Victorian state election: Warrnambool
Party	Candidate	Votes	%	±%
Liberal	John Murray	4,144	66.8	+0.9
Labor	Richard Morrison	2,063	33.2	−0.9
Total formal votes		6,207	99.3	−0.2
Informal votes		47	0.7	+0.2
Turnout		6,254	72.1	+14.9
Liberal hold		Swing	+0.9	
