= Results of the 1985 Victorian state election (Legislative Assembly) =

Australian state election results

Victorian state election, 2 March 1985 Legislative Assembly << 1982–1988 >>
| Enrolled voters | 2,641,477 | | | | |
| Votes cast | 2,462,226 | | Turnout | 93.21 | −0.76 |
| Informal votes | 66,107 | | Informal | 2.68 | +0.07 |
Summary of votes by party
| Party | Primary votes | % | Swing | Seats | Change |
| Labor | 1,198,262 | 50.01 | 0.00 | 47 | -2 |
| Liberal | 1,003,003 | 41.86 | +3.53 | 31 | +7 |
| National | 174,727 | 7.29 | +2.32 | 10 | +2 |
| Independent | 12,828 | 0.54 | +0.54 | 0 | ±0 |
| Other | 7,299 | 0.30 | | 0 | ±0 |
| Total | 2,396,119 | | | 88 | |
Two-party-preferred
| Labor | 1,214,832 | 50.7 | –3.1 | | |
| Liberal | 1,181,287 | 49.3 | +3.1 | | |

This is a list of electoral district results for the Victorian 1985 election for the Legislative Assembly.

== Results by electoral district ==
=== Albert Park ===
1985 Victorian state election: Albert Park
| Party | Candidate | Votes | % | ±% |
|---|---|---|---|---|
| Labor | Bunna Walsh | 15,186 | 62.2 | +0.6 |
| Liberal | Barry Semmens | 9,616 | 37.8 | +5.8 |
| Total formal votes | | 25,432 | 96.7 | |
| Informal votes | | 860 | 3.3 | |
| Turnout | | 26,292 | 88.2 | |
| Labor hold | | Swing | −3.5 | |

=== Ballarat North ===
1985 Victorian state election: Ballarat North
| Party | Candidate | Votes | % | ±% |
|---|---|---|---|---|
| Liberal | Tom Evans | 16,497 | 57.1 | +5.0 |
| Labor | Steve Bracks | 12,377 | 42.9 | −0.5 |
| Total formal votes | | 28,874 | 98.2 | |
| Informal votes | | 518 | 1.8 | |
| Turnout | | 29,392 | 94.5 | |
| Liberal hold | | Swing | +3.2 | |

=== Ballarat South ===
1985 Victorian state election: Ballarat South
| Party | Candidate | Votes | % | ±% |
|---|---|---|---|---|
| Labor | Frank Sheehan | 14,780 | 51.8 | +2.6 |
| Liberal | Clive Bubb | 13,764 | 48.2 | +2.7 |
| Total formal votes | | 28,544 | 98.2 | |
| Informal votes | | 518 | 1.8 | |
| Turnout | | 29,062 | 94.7 | |
| Labor hold | | Swing | −0.4 | |

=== Balwyn ===
1985 Victorian state election: Balwyn
| Party | Candidate | Votes | % | ±% |
|---|---|---|---|---|
| Liberal | Jim Ramsay | 17,994 | 65.4 | +8.2 |
| Labor | Frank Pederick | 9,509 | 34.6 | −0.2 |
| Total formal votes | | 27,503 | 98.1 | |
| Informal votes | | 543 | 1.9 | |
| Turnout | | 28,046 | 92.5 | |
| Liberal hold | | Swing | +4.9 | |

=== Bellarine ===
1985 Victorian state election: Bellarine
| Party | Candidate | Votes | % | ±% |
|---|---|---|---|---|
| Labor | Graham Ernst | 14,738 | 53.0 | +1.4 |
| Liberal | Hugh McKenzie | 13,098 | 47.0 | +6.0 |
| Total formal votes | | 27,836 | 98.1 | |
| Informal votes | | 526 | 1.9 | |
| Turnout | | 28,362 | 94.7 | |
| Labor hold | | Swing | −2.2 | |

=== Benalla ===
1985 Victorian state election: Benalla
| Party | Candidate | Votes | % | ±% |
|---|---|---|---|---|
| National | Pat McNamara | 13,031 | 47.4 | +13.4 |
| Labor | Grant Triffett | 8,922 | 32.5 | −1.7 |
| Liberal | Leonard Crocombe | 5,529 | 20.1 | −7.7 |
| Total formal votes | | 27,482 | 98.3 | |
| Informal votes | | 460 | 1.7 | |
| Turnout | | 27,942 | 92.6 | |
Two-party-preferred result
| National | Pat McNamara | 18,163 | 66.1 | +3.2 |
| Labor | Grant Triffett | 9,319 | 33.9 | −3.2 |
| National hold | | Swing | +3.2 | |

=== Benambra ===
1985 Victorian state election: Benambra
| Party | Candidate | Votes | % | ±% |
|---|---|---|---|---|
| Liberal | Lou Lieberman | 18,525 | 69.6 | +11.3 |
| Labor | Virginia Coghill | 8,105 | 30.4 | −2.0 |
| Total formal votes | | 26,630 | 98.0 | |
| Informal votes | | 533 | 2.0 | |
| Turnout | | 27,163 | 91.3 | |
| Liberal hold | | Swing | +3.1 | |

=== Bendigo East ===
1985 Victorian state election: Bendigo East
| Party | Candidate | Votes | % | ±% |
|---|---|---|---|---|
| Labor | John Reid | 12,493 | 44.2 | +1.9 |
| Liberal | Michael John | 10,929 | 38.7 | −2.8 |
| National | Barry McNaught | 4,819 | 17.1 | +13.2 |
| Total formal votes | | 28,241 | 98.4 | |
| Informal votes | | 452 | 1.6 | |
| Turnout | | 28,693 | 95.2 | |
Two-party-preferred result
| Liberal | Michael John | 15,218 | 53.9 | +2.6 |
| Labor | John Reid | 13,023 | 46.1 | −2.6 |
| Liberal hold | | Swing | +2.6 | |

=== Bendigo West ===
1985 Victorian state election: Bendigo West
| Party | Candidate | Votes | % | ±% |
|---|---|---|---|---|
| Labor | David Kennedy | 15,687 | 53.7 | +4.0 |
| Liberal | Alexander Sandner | 9,371 | 32.1 | −6.0 |
| National | Reginald Holt | 4,142 | 14.2 | +9.2 |
| Total formal votes | | 29,200 | 98.2 | |
| Informal votes | | 520 | 1.8 | |
| Turnout | | 29,720 | 95.0 | |
Two-party-preferred result
| Labor | David Kennedy | 16,264 | 55.7 | +1.0 |
| Liberal | Alexander Sandner | 12,936 | 44.3 | −1.0 |
| Labor hold | | Swing | +1.0 | |

=== Bennettswood ===
1985 Victorian state election: Bennettswood
| Party | Candidate | Votes | % | ±% |
|---|---|---|---|---|
| Liberal | Roger Pescott | 14,266 | 49.2 | +4.2 |
| Labor | Doug Newton | 13,993 | 48.3 | +1.6 |
| Independent | Ray Nilsen | 716 | 2.5 | +2.5 |
| Total formal votes | | 28,975 | 97.7 | |
| Informal votes | | 689 | 2.3 | |
| Turnout | | 29,664 | 94.4 | |
Two-party-preferred result
| Liberal | Roger Pescott | 14,717 | 50.8 | +2.0 |
| Labor | Doug Newton | 14,254 | 49.2 | −2.0 |
| Liberal gain from Labor | | Swing | +2.0 | |

=== Bentleigh ===
1985 Victorian state election: Bentleigh
| Party | Candidate | Votes | % | ±% |
|---|---|---|---|---|
| Labor | Gordon Hockley | 13,758 | 50.1 | +0.2 |
| Liberal | Peter Norman | 13,696 | 49.9 | +8.0 |
| Total formal votes | | 27,454 | 97.5 | |
| Informal votes | | 713 | 2.5 | |
| Turnout | | 28,167 | 94.3 | |
| Labor hold | | Swing | −4.4 | |

=== Berwick ===
1985 Victorian state election: Berwick
| Party | Candidate | Votes | % | ±% |
|---|---|---|---|---|
| Liberal | Rob Maclellan | 15,144 | 53.1 | +0.8 |
| Labor | Philip Staindl | 13,378 | 46.9 | −0.8 |
| Total formal votes | | 28,522 | 97.7 | |
| Informal votes | | 684 | 2.3 | |
| Turnout | | 29,206 | 94.0 | |
| Liberal hold | | Swing | +0.8 | |

=== Box Hill ===
1985 Victorian state election: Box Hill
| Party | Candidate | Votes | % | ±% |
|---|---|---|---|---|
| Labor | Margaret Ray | 14,336 | 50.8 | +2.3 |
| Liberal | George Cox | 12,621 | 44.7 | +4.5 |
| Independent | Peter Allan | 1,277 | 4.5 | +0.8 |
| Total formal votes | | 28,234 | 98.1 | |
| Informal votes | | 553 | 1.9 | |
| Turnout | | 28,787 | 93.3 | |
Two-party-preferred result
| Labor | Margaret Ray | 14,710 | 52.1 | −3.4 |
| Liberal | George Cox | 13,524 | 47.9 | +3.4 |
| Labor hold | | Swing | −3.4 | |

=== Brighton ===
1985 Victorian state election: Brighton
| Party | Candidate | Votes | % | ±% |
|---|---|---|---|---|
| Liberal | Alan Stockdale | 17,301 | 62.1 | +4.0 |
| Labor | Leslie Heimann | 10,560 | 37.9 | +6.0 |
| Total formal votes | | 27,861 | 97.4 | |
| Informal votes | | 737 | 2.6 | |
| Turnout | | 28,598 | 91.9 | |
| Liberal hold | | Swing | +3.8 | |

=== Broadmeadows ===
1985 Victorian state election: Broadmeadows
| Party | Candidate | Votes | % | ±% |
|---|---|---|---|---|
| Labor | Jack Culpin | 17,301 | 70.0 | −3.8 |
| Liberal | Mark Sinclair | 7,405 | 30.0 | +11.1 |
| Total formal votes | | 24,706 | 95.1 | |
| Informal votes | | 1,268 | 4.9 | |
| Turnout | | 25,974 | 93.2 | |
| Labor hold | | Swing | −6.8 | |

=== Brunswick ===
1985 Victorian state election: Brunswick
| Party | Candidate | Votes | % | ±% |
|---|---|---|---|---|
| Labor | Tom Roper | 18,371 | 70.6 | −1.1 |
| Liberal | Gregory Dinncen | 7,657 | 29.4 | +8.9 |
| Total formal votes | | 26,028 | 94.9 | |
| Informal votes | | 1,389 | 5.1 | |
| Turnout | | 27,417 | 89.8 | |
| Labor hold | | Swing | −6.7 | |

=== Bulleen ===
1985 Victorian state election: Bulleen
| Party | Candidate | Votes | % | ±% |
|---|---|---|---|---|
| Liberal | David Perrin | 15,645 | 57.8 | +7.9 |
| Labor | John Scomparin | 11,429 | 42.2 | +0.4 |
| Total formal votes | | 27,074 | 97.3 | |
| Informal votes | | 749 | 2.7 | |
| Turnout | | 27,823 | 94.1 | |
| Liberal hold | | Swing | +3.4 | |

=== Bundoora ===
1985 Victorian state election: Bundoora
| Party | Candidate | Votes | % | ±% |
|---|---|---|---|---|
| Labor | John Cain | 16,184 | 60.6 | −0.2 |
| Liberal | Alistair Urquhart | 8,713 | 32.6 | −0.9 |
| Weekend Trading | Frank Penhalluriack | 1,826 | 6.8 | +6.8 |
| Total formal votes | | 26,723 | 98.0 | |
| Informal votes | | 545 | 2.0 | |
| Turnout | | 27,268 | 94.5 | |
Two-party-preferred result
| Labor | John Cain | 16,648 | 62.3 | −2.0 |
| Liberal | Alistair Urquhart | 10,075 | 37.7 | +2.0 |
| Labor hold | | Swing | −2.0 | |

=== Burwood ===
1985 Victorian state election: Burwood
| Party | Candidate | Votes | % | ±% |
|---|---|---|---|---|
| Liberal | Jeff Kennett | 15,117 | 55.6 | +6.2 |
| Labor | Eric Hobsbawn | 12,083 | 44.4 | +3.0 |
| Total formal votes | | 27,200 | 97.8 | |
| Informal votes | | 622 | 2.2 | |
| Turnout | | 27,822 | 93.1 | |
| Liberal hold | | Swing | +2.5 | |

=== Carrum ===
1985 Victorian state election: Carrum
| Party | Candidate | Votes | % | ±% |
|---|---|---|---|---|
| Labor | Ian Cathie | 15,440 | 59.4 | +0.5 |
| Liberal | Bruce Bowie | 10,540 | 40.6 | +2.3 |
| Total formal votes | | 25,980 | 97.2 | |
| Informal votes | | 740 | 2.8 | |
| Turnout | | 26,720 | 93.1 | |
| Labor hold | | Swing | −1.5 | |

=== Caulfield ===
1985 Victorian state election: Caulfield
| Party | Candidate | Votes | % | ±% |
|---|---|---|---|---|
| Liberal | Ted Tanner | 15,460 | 57.3 | +8.6 |
| Labor | Jack Diamond | 11,527 | 42.7 | −0.5 |
| Total formal votes | | 26,987 | 96.8 | |
| Informal votes | | 877 | 3.2 | |
| Turnout | | 27,864 | 90.6 | |
| Liberal hold | | Swing | +4.1 | |

=== Clayton ===
1985 Victorian state election: Clayton
| Party | Candidate | Votes | % | ±% |
|---|---|---|---|---|
| Labor | Gerard Vaughan | 16,303 | 59.8 | +1.2 |
| Liberal | Alan Sandbach | 10,945 | 40.2 | +7.2 |
| Total formal votes | | 27,248 | 96.2 | |
| Informal votes | | 1,083 | 3.8 | |
| Turnout | | 28,331 | 94.0 | |
| Labor hold | | Swing | −2.7 | |

=== Coburg ===
1985 Victorian state election: Coburg
| Party | Candidate | Votes | % | ±% |
|---|---|---|---|---|
| Labor | Peter Gavin | 19,235 | 70.4 | −2.4 |
| Liberal | Antonino Boeti | 8,070 | 29.6 | +11.7 |
| Total formal votes | | 27,305 | 96.0 | |
| Informal votes | | 1,124 | 4.0 | |
| Turnout | | 28,429 | 92.6 | |
| Labor hold | | Swing | −5.3 | |

=== Dandenong ===
1985 Victorian state election: Dandenong
| Party | Candidate | Votes | % | ±% |
|---|---|---|---|---|
| Labor | Terry Norris | 15,970 | 61.1 | +3.9 |
| Liberal | Ian Fotheringham | 10,182 | 38.9 | −0.7 |
| Total formal votes | | 26,152 | 96.1 | |
| Informal votes | | 1,046 | 3.9 | |
| Turnout | | 27,198 | 92.0 | |
| Labor hold | | Swing | +2.2 | |

=== Dandenong North ===
1985 Victorian state election: Dandenong North
| Party | Candidate | Votes | % | ±% |
|---|---|---|---|---|
| Labor | Jan Wilson | 15,436 | 59.1 | +0.6 |
| Liberal | George Grech | 10,679 | 40.9 | +3.3 |
| Total formal votes | | 26,115 | 96.5 | |
| Informal votes | | 942 | 3.5 | |
| Turnout | | 27,057 | 94.4 | |
| Labor hold | | Swing | −2.6 | |

=== Derrimut ===
1985 Victorian state election: Derrimut
| Party | Candidate | Votes | % | ±% |
|---|---|---|---|---|
| Labor | David Cunningham | 17,326 | 65.6 | −3.3 |
| Liberal | Helen Hurley | 9,078 | 34.4 | +9.2 |
| Total formal votes | | 26,404 | 96.4 | |
| Informal votes | | 989 | 3.6 | |
| Turnout | | 27,393 | 93.9 | |
| Labor hold | | Swing | −8.1 | |

=== Doncaster ===
1985 Victorian state election: Doncaster
| Party | Candidate | Votes | % | ±% |
|---|---|---|---|---|
| Liberal | Morris Williams | 14,635 | 55.6 | +5.5 |
| Labor | William Poppins | 11,666 | 44.4 | +3.8 |
| Total formal votes | | 26,301 | 97.8 | |
| Informal votes | | 600 | 2.2 | |
| Turnout | | 26,901 | 94.5 | |
| Liberal hold | | Swing | +1.4 | |

=== Doveton ===
1985 Victorian state election: Doveton
| Party | Candidate | Votes | % | ±% |
|---|---|---|---|---|
| Labor | Rob Jolly | 17,116 | 64.9 | +1.6 |
| Liberal | Matthew Starr | 9,264 | 35.1 | −0.7 |
| Total formal votes | | 26,380 | 96.8 | |
| Informal votes | | 870 | 3.2 | +0.4 |
| Turnout | | 27,250 | 94.0 | |
| Labor hold | | Swing | +0.4 | |

=== Dromana ===
1985 Victorian state election: Dromana
| Party | Candidate | Votes | % | ±% |
|---|---|---|---|---|
| Liberal | Ron Wells | 14,523 | 52.4 | +9.7 |
| Labor | Allison Ogden | 13,179 | 47.6 | +3.0 |
| Total formal votes | | 27,702 | 98.3 | |
| Informal votes | | 487 | 1.7 | |
| Turnout | | 28,189 | 93.6 | |
| Liberal gain from Labor | | Swing | +3.8 | |

=== Essendon ===
1985 Victorian state election: Essendon
| Party | Candidate | Votes | % | ±% |
|---|---|---|---|---|
| Labor | Barry Rowe | 16,964 | 62.1 | −1.8 |
| Liberal | Brian Dodgson | 10,360 | 37.9 | +3.7 |
| Total formal votes | | 27,324 | 96.7 | |
| Informal votes | | 935 | 3.3 | |
| Turnout | | 28,259 | 91.8 | |
| Labor hold | | Swing | −2.9 | |

=== Evelyn ===
1985 Victorian state election: Evelyn
| Party | Candidate | Votes | % | ±% |
|---|---|---|---|---|
| Liberal | Jim Plowman | 13,899 | 49.9 | +6.6 |
| Labor | Graham Ihlein | 12,594 | 45.2 | +0.3 |
| Independent | Gaye Gelly | 1,360 | 4.9 | +4.9 |
| Total formal votes | | 27,853 | 97.9 | |
| Informal votes | | 601 | 2.1 | |
| Turnout | | 28,454 | 93.8 | |
Two-party-preferred result
| Liberal | Jim Plowman | 13,899 | 52.8 | +4.1 |
| Labor | Graham Ihlein | 13,137 | 47.2 | −4.1 |
| Liberal gain from Labor | | Swing | +4.1 | |

=== Footscray ===
1985 Victorian state election: Footscray
| Party | Candidate | Votes | % | ±% |
|---|---|---|---|---|
| Labor | Robert Fordham | 20,516 | 73.4 | −2.7 |
| Liberal | Hugh Cameron | 7,455 | 26.6 | +3.0 |
| Total formal votes | | 27,971 | 95.2 | |
| Informal votes | | 1,401 | 4.8 | |
| Turnout | | 29,372 | 91.4 | |
| Labor hold | | Swing | −3.0 | |

=== Forest Hill ===
1985 Victorian state election: Forest Hill
| Party | Candidate | Votes | % | ±% |
|---|---|---|---|---|
| Liberal | John Richardson | 14,543 | 53.9 | +7.2 |
| Labor | John Madden | 12,452 | 46.1 | +1.4 |
| Total formal votes | | 26,995 | 97.5 | |
| Informal votes | | 679 | 2.5 | |
| Turnout | | 27,674 | 94.7 | |
| Liberal hold | | Swing | +3.3 | |

=== Frankston North ===
1985 Victorian state election: Frankston North
| Party | Candidate | Votes | % | ±% |
|---|---|---|---|---|
| Labor | Jane Hill | 15,712 | 57.9 | +0.7 |
| Liberal | Robert Garnett | 10,139 | 37.3 | +0.8 |
| Independent | Judy Hale | 1,292 | 4.8 | +4.8 |
| Total formal votes | | 27,143 | 97.5 | |
| Informal votes | | 690 | 2.5 | |
| Turnout | | 27,833 | 93.2 | |
Two-party-preferred result
| Labor | Jane Hill | 16,014 | 59.0 | −2.9 |
| Liberal | Robert Garnett | 11,129 | 41.0 | +2.9 |
| Labor hold | | Swing | −2.9 | |

=== Frankston South ===
1985 Victorian state election: Frankston South
| Party | Candidate | Votes | % | ±% |
|---|---|---|---|---|
| Liberal | Graeme Weideman | 14,384 | 53.6 | +4.1 |
| Labor | Geoffrey Holland | 12,441 | 46.4 | +5.2 |
| Total formal votes | | 26,825 | 97.7 | |
| Informal votes | | 635 | 2.3 | |
| Turnout | | 27,460 | 93.1 | |
| Liberal hold | | Swing | +1.4 | |

=== Geelong ===
1985 Victorian state election: Geelong
| Party | Candidate | Votes | % | ±% |
|---|---|---|---|---|
| Labor | Hayden Shell | 15,946 | 56.1 | +4.6 |
| Liberal | Clive Pugh | 12,501 | 43.9 | +2.7 |
| Total formal votes | | 28,447 | 97.7 | |
| Informal votes | | 672 | 2.3 | |
| Turnout | | 29,119 | 92.8 | |
| Labor hold | | Swing | +1.2 | |

=== Geelong North ===
1985 Victorian state election: Geelong North
| Party | Candidate | Votes | % | ±% |
|---|---|---|---|---|
| Labor | Neil Trezise | 17,408 | 65.8 | −3.3 |
| Liberal | John Lucas | 9,068 | 34.2 | +3.3 |
| Total formal votes | | 26,476 | 96.6 | |
| Informal votes | | 929 | 3.4 | |
| Turnout | | 27,405 | 93.7 | |
| Labor hold | | Swing | −3.3 | |

=== Gippsland East ===
1985 Victorian state election: Gippsland East
| Party | Candidate | Votes | % | ±% |
|---|---|---|---|---|
| National | Bruce Evans | 13,078 | 49.6 | +5.5 |
| Labor | Clifford Harding | 8,081 | 30.7 | −1.7 |
| Liberal | David McInnes | 5,196 | 19.7 | +0.4 |
| Total formal votes | | 26,355 | 98.5 | |
| Informal votes | | 406 | 1.5 | |
| Turnout | | 26,761 | 92.7 | |
Two-party-preferred result
| National | Bruce Evans | 17,794 | 67.5 | +3.3 |
| Labor | Clifford Harding | 8,561 | 32.5 | −3.3 |
| National hold | | Swing | +3.3 | |

=== Gippsland South ===
1985 Victorian state election: Gippsland South
| Party | Candidate | Votes | % | ±% |
|---|---|---|---|---|
| National | Tom Wallace | 13,592 | 48.9 | +16.4 |
| Liberal | Neil McInnes | 7,125 | 25.6 | −10.3 |
| Labor | Max Semken | 7,061 | 25.4 | −0.6 |
| Total formal votes | | 27,778 | 98.5 | |
| Informal votes | | 435 | 1.5 | |
| Turnout | | 28,213 | 93.1 | |
Two-party-preferred result
| National | Tom Wallace | 19,945 | 71.8 | +3.5 |
| Labor | Max Semken | 7,833 | 28.2 | −3.5 |
Two-candidate-preferred result
| National | Tom Wallace | 18,960 | 68.3 | |
| Liberal | Neil McInnes | 8,812 | 31.7 | |
| National hold | | Swing | | |

=== Gippsland West ===
1985 Victorian state election: Gippsland West
| Party | Candidate | Votes | % | ±% |
|---|---|---|---|---|
| Liberal | Alan Brown | 14,561 | 49.3 | −0.8 |
| Labor | Geoffrey Bull | 10,611 | 35.9 | −0.5 |
| National | William Ronald | 4,368 | 14.8 | +11.2 |
| Total formal votes | | 29,540 | 98.2 | |
| Informal votes | | 529 | 1.8 | |
| Turnout | | 30,069 | 94.8 | |
Two-party-preferred result
| Liberal | Alan Brown | 18,343 | 62.1 | +2.0 |
| Labor | Geoffrey Bull | 11,196 | 37.9 | −2.0 |
| Liberal hold | | Swing | +2.0 | |

=== Gisborne ===
1985 Victorian state election: Gisborne
| Party | Candidate | Votes | % | ±% |
|---|---|---|---|---|
| Liberal | Tom Reynolds | 16,400 | 57.5 | +10.5 |
| Labor | Douglas Bishop | 12,114 | 42.5 | −2.8 |
| Total formal votes | | 28,514 | 98.3 | |
| Informal votes | | 495 | 1.7 | |
| Turnout | | 29,009 | 94.7 | |
| Liberal hold | | Swing | +6.5 | |

=== Glen Waverley ===
1985 Victorian state election: Glen Waverley
| Party | Candidate | Votes | % | ±% |
|---|---|---|---|---|
| Liberal | Ross Smith | 16,502 | 60.1 | +8.2 |
| Labor | John Candappa | 10,963 | 39.9 | +1.0 |
| Total formal votes | | 27,465 | 97.5 | |
| Informal votes | | 694 | 2.5 | |
| Turnout | | 28,159 | 95.5 | |
| Liberal hold | | Swing | +4.3 | |

=== Greensborough ===
1985 Victorian state election: Greensborough
| Party | Candidate | Votes | % | ±% |
|---|---|---|---|---|
| Labor | Pauline Toner | 14,632 | 55.1 | +1.2 |
| Liberal | Andrew Cove | 11,930 | 44.9 | +8.3 |
| Total formal votes | | 26,562 | 97.8 | |
| Informal votes | | 595 | 2.2 | |
| Turnout | | 27,157 | 93.8 | |
| Labor hold | | Swing | −3.7 | |

=== Hawthorn ===
1985 Victorian state election: Hawthorn
| Party | Candidate | Votes | % | ±% |
|---|---|---|---|---|
| Liberal | Phil Gude | 15,605 | 55.7 | +4.3 |
| Labor | Jill Eastwood | 12,387 | 44.3 | +3.2 |
| Total formal votes | | 27,992 | 97.4 | |
| Informal votes | | 738 | 2.6 | |
| Turnout | | 28,730 | 90.5 | |
| Liberal hold | | Swing | +1.5 | |

=== Ivanhoe ===
1985 Victorian state election: Ivanhoe
| Party | Candidate | Votes | % | ±% |
|---|---|---|---|---|
| Liberal | Vin Heffernan | 14,665 | 51.6 | +6.4 |
| Labor | Tony Sheehan | 13,740 | 48.4 | +0.1 |
| Total formal votes | | 28,405 | 97.7 | |
| Informal votes | | 657 | 2.3 | |
| Turnout | | 29,062 | 93.6 | |
| Liberal gain from Labor | | Swing | +2.7 | |

=== Keilor ===
1985 Victorian state election: Keilor
| Party | Candidate | Votes | % | ±% |
|---|---|---|---|---|
| Labor | George Seitz | 16,636 | 61.5 | −5.4 |
| Liberal | Graham Andersen | 10,432 | 38.5 | +8.2 |
| Total formal votes | | 27,068 | 96.6 | |
| Informal votes | | 962 | 3.4 | |
| Turnout | | 28,030 | 94.5 | |
| Labor hold | | Swing | −7.5 | |

=== Kew ===
1985 Victorian state election: Kew
| Party | Candidate | Votes | % | ±% |
|---|---|---|---|---|
| Liberal | Prue Sibree | 16,403 | 60.2 | +4.4 |
| Labor | Annamaria Dierer | 10,843 | 39.8 | +5.8 |
| Total formal votes | | 27,246 | 97.1 | |
| Informal votes | | 818 | 2.9 | |
| Turnout | | 28,064 | 91.9 | |
| Liberal hold | | Swing | −0.3 | |

=== Knox ===
1985 Victorian state election: Knox
| Party | Candidate | Votes | % | ±% |
|---|---|---|---|---|
| Labor | Steve Crabb | 15,236 | 59.3 | +1.2 |
| Liberal | Jill Hall | 9,480 | 36.9 | +1.9 |
| Public Transport | Thomas Tyrer | 967 | 3.8 | +3.8 |
| Total formal votes | | 25,683 | 97.9 | |
| Informal votes | | 559 | 2.1 | |
| Turnout | | 26,242 | 94.2 | |
Two-party-preferred result
| Labor | Steve Crabb | 15,769 | 61.4 | −0.7 |
| Liberal | Jill Hall | 9,914 | 38.6 | +0.7 |
| Labor hold | | Swing | −0.7 | |

=== Lowan ===
1985 Victorian state election: Lowan
| Party | Candidate | Votes | % | ±% |
|---|---|---|---|---|
| National | Bill McGrath | 17,138 | 63.2 | +14.8 |
| Labor | William Albon | 5,052 | 18.6 | −3.7 |
| Liberal | John Mann | 4,944 | 18.2 | −9.0 |
| Total formal votes | | 27,134 | 98.9 | |
| Informal votes | | 300 | 1.1 | |
| Turnout | | 27,434 | 95.8 | |
Two-party-preferred result
| National | Bill McGrath | 21,761 | 80.2 | +4.5 |
| Labor | William Albon | 5,373 | 19.8 | −4.5 |
| National hold | | Swing | +4.5 | |

=== Malvern ===
1985 Victorian state election: Malvern
| Party | Candidate | Votes | % | ±% |
|---|---|---|---|---|
| Liberal | Geoff Leigh | 15,920 | 59.8 | +4.3 |
| Labor | Max Dumais | 10,697 | 40.2 | +2.8 |
| Total formal votes | | 26,617 | 97.7 | |
| Informal votes | | 624 | 2.3 | |
| Turnout | | 27,241 | 2.3 | |
| Liberal hold | | Swing | +0.5 | |

=== Melbourne ===
1985 Victorian state election: Melbourne
| Party | Candidate | Votes | % | ±% |
|---|---|---|---|---|
| Labor | Keith Remington | 15,155 | 61.0 | −3.4 |
| Liberal | Peter Jones | 7,996 | 32.2 | +7.9 |
| Public Transport | Janet Walk | 1,709 | 6.9 | +6.9 |
| Total formal votes | | 24,860 | 95.7 | |
| Informal votes | | 1,121 | 4.3 | |
| Turnout | | 25,981 | 85.5 | |
Two-party-preferred result
| Labor | Keith Remington | 16,209 | 65.2 | −6.1 |
| Liberal | Peter Jones | 8,651 | 34.8 | +6.1 |
| Labor hold | | Swing | −6.1 | |

=== Mentone ===
1985 Victorian state election: Mentone
| Party | Candidate | Votes | % | ±% |
|---|---|---|---|---|
| Labor | Peter Spyker | 14,406 | 52.0 | +0.1 |
| Liberal | Bill Templeton | 13,315 | 48.0 | −4.9 |
| Total formal votes | | 27,721 | 97.4 | |
| Informal votes | | 731 | 2.6 | |
| Turnout | | 28,452 | 93.7 | |
| Labor notional hold | | Swing | −1.7 | |

=== Mildura ===
1985 Victorian state election: Mildura
| Party | Candidate | Votes | % | ±% |
|---|---|---|---|---|
| National | Milton Whiting | 15,283 | 58.7 | +4.7 |
| Labor | Lindsay Leake | 5,959 | 22.9 | −6.9 |
| Liberal | Diana Duck | 4,796 | 18.4 | +7.2 |
| Total formal votes | | 26,038 | 97.9 | |
| Informal votes | | 560 | 2.1 | |
| Turnout | | 26,598 | 92.3 | |
Two-party-preferred result
| National | Milton Whiting | 19,008 | 73.0 | +5.7 |
| Labor | Lindsay Leake | 7,050 | 27.0 | −5.7 |
| National hold | | Swing | +5.7 | |

=== Mitcham ===
1985 Victorian state election: Mitcham
| Party | Candidate | Votes | % | ±% |
|---|---|---|---|---|
| Labor | John Harrowfield | 14,928 | 53.7 | +4.9 |
| Liberal | Bruce Camfield | 12,868 | 46.3 | +5.6 |
| Total formal votes | | 27,796 | 97.5 | |
| Informal votes | | 708 | 2.5 | |
| Turnout | | 28,504 | 94.4 | |
| Labor hold | | Swing | +0.1 | |

=== Monbulk ===
1985 Victorian state election: Monbulk
| Party | Candidate | Votes | % | ±% |
|---|---|---|---|---|
| Labor | Neil Pope | 14,239 | 53.7 | +12.3 |
| Liberal | Raymond Yates | 12,270 | 46.3 | +7.1 |
| Total formal votes | | 26,509 | 97.8 | |
| Informal votes | | 608 | 2.2 | |
| Turnout | | 27,117 | 92.6 | |
| Labor hold | | Swing | +0.9 | |

=== Mornington ===
1985 Victorian state election: Mornington
| Party | Candidate | Votes | % | ±% |
|---|---|---|---|---|
| Liberal | Robin Cooper | 14,376 | 52.0 | +7.6 |
| Labor | David Hassett | 13,275 | 48.0 | +3.8 |
| Total formal votes | | 27,651 | 97.7 | |
| Informal votes | | 644 | 2.3 | |
| Turnout | | 28,295 | 92.4 | |
| Liberal gain from Labor | | Swing | +3.4 | |

=== Morwell ===
1985 Victorian state election: Morwell
| Party | Candidate | Votes | % | ±% |
|---|---|---|---|---|
| Labor | Valerie Callister | 14,472 | 52.7 | −7.9 |
| Liberal | Graeme Bond | 6,976 | 25.4 | +1.3 |
| Independent | Geoffrey Francis | 3,701 | 13.5 | +13.5 |
| National | Terie Porter | 2,305 | 8.4 | −0.5 |
| Total formal votes | | 27,454 | 97.8 | |
| Informal votes | | 616 | 2.2 | |
| Turnout | | 28,070 | 93.6 | |
Two-party-preferred result
| Labor | Valerie Callister | 15,759 | 57.4 | −7.4 |
| Liberal | Graeme Bond | 11,695 | 42.6 | +7.4 |
| Labor hold | | Swing | −7.4 | |

=== Murray Valley ===
1985 Victorian state election: Murray Valley
| Party | Candidate | Votes | % | ±% |
|---|---|---|---|---|
| National | Ken Jasper | 16,880 | 59.0 | +5.3 |
| Labor | Jill Milthorpe | 7,633 | 26.7 | −3.8 |
| Liberal | Bill Hunter | 4,093 | 14.3 | −1.3 |
| Total formal votes | | 28,606 | 98.2 | |
| Informal votes | | 526 | 1.8 | |
| Turnout | | 29,132 | 94.1 | |
Two-party-preferred result
| National | Ken Jasper | 20,654 | 72.2 | +3.9 |
| Labor | Jill Milthorpe | 7,952 | 27.8 | −3.9 |
| National hold | | Swing | +3.9 | |

=== Narracan ===
1985 Victorian state election: Narracan
| Party | Candidate | Votes | % | ±% |
|---|---|---|---|---|
| Labor | Robin Matthews | 12,619 | 46.3 | +0.4 |
| Liberal | John Delzoppo | 11,880 | 43.6 | +5.8 |
| National | Julia Ettery | 1,905 | 7.0 | −1.8 |
| Independent | John McNamara | 842 | 3.1 | +3.1 |
| Total formal votes | | 27,246 | 98.0 | |
| Informal votes | | 564 | 2.0 | |
| Turnout | | 27,810 | 94.5 | |
Two-party-preferred result
| Liberal | John Delzoppo | 13,716 | 50.4 | +1.8 |
| Labor | Robin Matthews | 13,522 | 49.6 | −1.8 |
| Liberal notional gain from Labor | | Swing | +1.8 | |

=== Niddrie ===
1985 Victorian state election: Niddrie
| Party | Candidate | Votes | % | ±% |
|---|---|---|---|---|
| Labor | Jack Simpson | 17,177 | 63.0 | +0.6 |
| Liberal | Mark Pallett | 10,094 | 37.0 | +9.0 |
| Total formal votes | | 27,271 | 96.4 | |
| Informal votes | | 1,016 | 3.6 | |
| Turnout | | 28,287 | 95.2 | |
| Labor hold | | Swing | −5.2 | |

=== Northcote ===
1985 Victorian state election: Northcote
| Party | Candidate | Votes | % | ±% |
|---|---|---|---|---|
| Labor | Frank Wilkes | 19,120 | 71.8 | −2.8 |
| Liberal | William Hamilton | 7,495 | 28.2 | +2.8 |
| Total formal votes | | 26,615 | 95.5 | |
| Informal votes | | 1,252 | 4.5 | |
| Turnout | | 27,867 | 90.8 | |
| Labor hold | | Swing | −2.8 | |

=== Oakleigh ===
1985 Victorian state election: Oakleigh
| Party | Candidate | Votes | % | ±% |
|---|---|---|---|---|
| Labor | Race Mathews | 14,374 | 53.8 | −0.6 |
| Liberal | Norman Kennedy | 11,493 | 43.0 | +5.1 |
| Independent | Antonios Pashos | 846 | 3.2 | +3.2 |
| Total formal votes | | 26,713 | 97.1 | |
| Informal votes | | 783 | 2.9 | |
| Turnout | | 27,496 | 91.8 | |
Two-party-preferred result
| Labor | Race Mathews | 14,986 | 56.1 | −3.0 |
| Liberal | Norman Kennedy | 11,727 | 43.9 | +3.0 |
| Labor hold | | Swing | −3.0 | |

=== Pascoe Vale ===
1985 Victorian state election: Pascoe Vale
| Party | Candidate | Votes | % | ±% |
|---|---|---|---|---|
| Labor | Tom Edmunds | 16,783 | 61.4 | +1.3 |
| Liberal | Vincenzo D'Aquino | 10,571 | 38.6 | +2.3 |
| Total formal votes | | 27,354 | 96.4 | |
| Informal votes | | 1,011 | 3.6 | |
| Turnout | | 28,365 | 94.3 | |
| Labor hold | | Swing | 0.0 | |

=== Polwarth ===
1985 Victorian state election: Polwarth
| Party | Candidate | Votes | % | ±% |
|---|---|---|---|---|
| Liberal | Ian Smith | 16,907 | 54.5 | −6.7 |
| Labor | Jeffery Rootes | 8,401 | 29.4 | −1.0 |
| National | David Seymour | 4,626 | 16.2 | +16.2 |
| Total formal votes | | 28,608 | 98.4 | |
| Informal votes | | 453 | 1.6 | |
| Turnout | | 29,061 | 96.0 | |
Two-party-preferred result
| Liberal | Ian Smith | 19,539 | 68.3 | +3.3 |
| Labor | Jeffery Rootes | 9,069 | 31.7 | −3.3 |
| Liberal hold | | Swing | +3.3 | |

=== Portland ===
1985 Victorian state election: Portland
| Party | Candidate | Votes | % | ±% |
|---|---|---|---|---|
| Liberal | Digby Crozier | 13,562 | 50.3 | −5.4 |
| Labor | William Sharrock | 9,244 | 34.3 | −4.2 |
| National | James Patterson | 4,176 | 15.5 | +15.5 |
| Total formal votes | | 26,982 | 98.6 | |
| Informal votes | | 388 | 1.4 | |
| Turnout | | 27,370 | 94.9 | |
Two-party-preferred result
| Liberal | Digby Crozier | 17,080 | 63.3 | +4.7 |
| Labor | William Sharrock | 9,902 | 36.7 | −4.7 |
| Liberal hold | | Swing | +4.7 | |

=== Prahran ===
1985 Victorian state election: Prahran
| Party | Candidate | Votes | % | ±% |
|---|---|---|---|---|
| Liberal | Don Hayward | 14,582 | 53.4 | +3.9 |
| Labor | Hendrik van Leeuwen | 11,250 | 41.2 | −3.4 |
| Independent | Norman Long | 746 | 2.7 | +2.7 |
| Public Transport | Alan Parker | 714 | 2.6 | +2.6 |
| Total formal votes | | 27,292 | 97.2 | |
| Informal votes | | 788 | 2.8 | |
| Turnout | | 28,080 | 88.3 | |
Two-party-preferred result
| Liberal | Don Hayward | 15,502 | 56.8 | +5.1 |
| Labor | Hendrik van Leeuwen | 11,790 | 43.2 | −5.1 |
| Liberal hold | | Swing | +5.1 | |

=== Preston ===
1985 Victorian state election: Preston
| Party | Candidate | Votes | % | ±% |
|---|---|---|---|---|
| Labor | Carl Kirkwood | 19,473 | 69.6 | −1.5 |
| Liberal | Mark Leaman | 8,517 | 30.4 | +20.0 |
| Total formal votes | | 27,990 | 95.8 | |
| Informal votes | | 1,234 | 4.2 | |
| Turnout | | 29,224 | 91.3 | |
| Labor hold | | Swing | −5.3 | |

=== Reservoir ===
1985 Victorian state election: Reservoir
| Party | Candidate | Votes | % | ±% |
|---|---|---|---|---|
| Labor | Jim Simmonds | 18,837 | 68.7 | −2.2 |
| Liberal | Rae Kennett | 8,597 | 31.3 | +2.4 |
| Total formal votes | | 27,434 | 95.8 | |
| Informal votes | | 1,209 | 4.2 | |
| Turnout | | 28,643 | 93.8 | |
| Labor hold | | Swing | −2.4 | |

=== Richmond ===
1985 Victorian state election: Richmond
| Party | Candidate | Votes | % | ±% |
|---|---|---|---|---|
| Labor | Theo Sidiropoulos | 18,396 | 71.4 | +2.1 |
| Liberal | John Sevior | 7,366 | 28.6 | +10.0 |
| Total formal votes | | 25,762 | 95.2 | |
| Informal votes | | 1,290 | 4.8 | |
| Turnout | | 27,052 | 87.1 | |
| Labor hold | | Swing | −6.5 | |

=== Ringwood ===
1985 Victorian state election: Ringwood
| Party | Candidate | Votes | % | ±% |
|---|---|---|---|---|
| Labor | Kay Setches | 14,466 | 52.7 | +5.5 |
| Liberal | Michael Dobson | 12,986 | 47.3 | +6.8 |
| Total formal votes | | 27,452 | 97.9 | |
| Informal votes | | 593 | 2.1 | |
| Turnout | | 28,045 | 93.9 | |
| Labor hold | | Swing | +0.1 | |

=== Ripon ===
1985 Victorian state election: Ripon
| Party | Candidate | Votes | % | ±% |
|---|---|---|---|---|
| Liberal | Tom Austin | 15,861 | 56.5 | +2.1 |
| Labor | John McQuilten | 12,204 | 43.5 | −2.0 |
| Total formal votes | | 28,065 | 98.2 | |
| Informal votes | | 501 | 1.8 | |
| Turnout | | 28,566 | 95.5 | |
| Liberal hold | | Swing | +2.0 | |

=== Rodney ===
1985 Victorian state election: Rodney
| Party | Candidate | Votes | % | ±% |
|---|---|---|---|---|
| National | Eddie Hann | 19,893 | 70.4 | +8.2 |
| Labor | Denise MacDonald | 5,430 | 19.2 | −0.4 |
| Liberal | John Adams | 2,917 | 10.3 | −4.3 |
| Total formal votes | | 28,240 | 98.6 | |
| Informal votes | | 393 | 1.4 | |
| Turnout | | 28,633 | 94.6 | |
Two-party-preferred result
| National | Eddie Hann | 22,620 | 80.1 | +2.0 |
| Labor | Denise MacDonald | 5,620 | 19.9 | −2.0 |
| National hold | | Swing | +2.0 | |

=== St Albans ===
1985 Victorian state election: St Albans
| Party | Candidate | Votes | % | ±% |
|---|---|---|---|---|
| Labor | Alex Andrianopoulos | 19,642 | 71.0 | −5.1 |
| Liberal | Martin Power | 8,033 | 29.0 | +6.4 |
| Total formal votes | | 27,675 | 93.8 | |
| Informal votes | | 1,823 | 6.2 | |
| Turnout | | 29,498 | 93.4 | |
| Labor hold | | Swing | −6.2 | |

=== St Kilda ===
1985 Victorian state election: St Kilda
| Party | Candidate | Votes | % | ±% |
|---|---|---|---|---|
| Labor | Andrew McCutcheon | 13,918 | 52.7 | +3.6 |
| Liberal | Richard Stevenson | 12,518 | 47.3 | +4.4 |
| Total formal votes | | 26,436 | 96.4 | |
| Informal votes | | 973 | 3.6 | |
| Turnout | | 27,409 | 88.9 | |
| Labor hold | | Swing | +0.2 | |

=== Sandringham ===
1985 Victorian state election: Sandringham
| Party | Candidate | Votes | % | ±% |
|---|---|---|---|---|
| Liberal | David Lea | 15,330 | 54.9 | +4.9 |
| Labor | Ann Corcoran | 12,603 | 45.1 | +1.3 |
| Total formal votes | | 27,933 | 97.8 | |
| Informal votes | | 640 | 2.2 | |
| Turnout | | 28,573 | 92.8 | |
| Liberal gain from Labor | | Swing | +2.3 | |

=== Shepparton ===
1985 Victorian state election: Shepparton
| Party | Candidate | Votes | % | ±% |
|---|---|---|---|---|
| National | Peter Ross-Edwards | 15,428 | 56.6 | +9.0 |
| Labor | David Wauchope | 7,090 | 26.0 | −4.0 |
| Liberal | Alan Fitzgerald | 4,721 | 17.3 | −5.0 |
| Total formal votes | | 27,239 | 98.0 | |
| Informal votes | | 545 | 2.0 | |
| Turnout | | 27,784 | 93.8 | |
Two-party-preferred result
| National | Peter Ross-Edwards | 19,830 | 72.8 | +4.9 |
| Labor | David Wauchope | 7,409 | 27.2 | −4.9 |
| National hold | | Swing | +4.9 | |

=== South Barwon ===
1985 Victorian state election: South Barwon
| Party | Candidate | Votes | % | ±% |
|---|---|---|---|---|
| Liberal | Harley Dickinson | 14,218 | 53.4 | +3.8 |
| Labor | Harry Naylor | 12,406 | 46.6 | +2.8 |
| Total formal votes | | 26,224 | 98.0 | |
| Informal votes | | 535 | 2.0 | |
| Turnout | | 27,159 | 95.8 | |
| Liberal hold | | Swing | +1.0 | |

=== Springvale ===
1985 Victorian state election: Springvale
| Party | Candidate | Votes | % | ±% |
|---|---|---|---|---|
| Labor | Eddie Micallef | 15,207 | 57.0 | +3.0 |
| Liberal | Therese Marley | 11,465 | 43.0 | +2.5 |
| Total formal votes | | 26,672 | 95.9 | |
| Informal votes | | 1,130 | 4.1 | |
| Turnout | | 27,802 | 93.8 | |
| Labor hold | | Swing | −0.8 | |

=== Sunshine ===
1985 Victorian state election: Sunshine
| Party | Candidate | Votes | % | ±% |
|---|---|---|---|---|
| Labor | Bill Fogarty | 19,032 | 71.1 | −3.2 |
| Liberal | Aldous Hicks | 7,748 | 28.9 | +6.8 |
| Total formal votes | | 26,780 | 95.5 | |
| Informal votes | | 1,251 | 4.5 | |
| Turnout | | 28,031 | 92.4 | |
| Labor hold | | Swing | −5.1 | |

=== Swan Hill ===
1985 Victorian state election: Swan Hill
| Party | Candidate | Votes | % | ±% |
|---|---|---|---|---|
| National | Barry Steggall | 15,192 | 58.4 | +38.6 |
| Liberal | Ian Ray | 5,450 | 20.9 | −35.7 |
| Labor | Ronald Stanton | 5,388 | 20.7 | +0.5 |
| Total formal votes | | 26,030 | 98.5 | |
| Informal votes | | 398 | 1.5 | |
| Turnout | | 26,428 | 94.2 | |
Two-party-preferred result
| National | Barry Steggall | 20,199 | 77.6 | +3.7 |
| Labor | Ronald Stanton | 5,831 | 22.4 | −3.7 |
| National gain from Liberal | | Swing | N/A | |

- The two candidate preferred vote was not counted between the Liberal and National candidates for Swan Hill.

=== Syndal ===
1985 Victorian state election: Syndal
| Party | Candidate | Votes | % | ±% |
|---|---|---|---|---|
| Liberal | Geoff Coleman | 13,492 | 49.7 | +6.3 |
| Labor | David Gray | 12,862 | 47.4 | +0.8 |
| Independent | Edward Hawthorn | 773 | 2.9 | +2.9 |
| Total formal votes | | 27,127 | 97.5 | |
| Informal votes | | 696 | 2.5 | |
| Turnout | | 27,823 | 95.3 | |
Two-party-preferred result
| Liberal | Geoff Coleman | 13,929 | 51.4 | +1.5 |
| Labor | David Gray | 13,198 | 48.6 | −1.5 |
| Liberal gain from Labor | | Swing | +1.5 | |

=== Thomastown ===
1985 Victorian state election: Thomastown
| Party | Candidate | Votes | % | ±% |
|---|---|---|---|---|
| Labor | Beth Gleeson | 19,802 | 73.9 | −1.0 |
| Liberal | Adam Barr | 6,994 | 26.1 | +11.4 |
| Total formal votes | | 26,796 | 95.4 | |
| Informal votes | | 1,303 | 4.6 | |
| Turnout | | 28,099 | 94.5 | |
| Labor hold | | Swing | −6.6 | |

=== Wantirna ===
1985 Victorian state election: Wantirna
| Party | Candidate | Votes | % | ±% |
|---|---|---|---|---|
| Labor | Carolyn Hirsh | 14,624 | 55.3 | +3.1 |
| Liberal | Karen Dettmann | 11,838 | 44.7 | +5.5 |
| Total formal votes | | 26,462 | 97.3 | |
| Informal votes | | 724 | 2.7 | |
| Turnout | | 27,186 | 95.4 | |
| Labor hold | | Swing | −2.1 | |

=== Warrandyte ===
1985 Victorian state election: Warrandyte
| Party | Candidate | Votes | % | ±% |
|---|---|---|---|---|
| Labor | Lou Hill | 12,879 | 48.7 | +3.1 |
| Liberal | Gracia Baylor | 12,270 | 46.4 | +4.8 |
| Independent | Timothy Connellan | 1,275 | 4.8 | +4.8 |
| Total formal votes | | 26,424 | 98.2 | |
| Informal votes | | 483 | 1.8 | |
| Turnout | | 26,907 | 94.4 | |
Two-party-preferred result
| Labor | Lou Hill | 13,254 | 50.2 | −4.5 |
| Liberal | Gracia Baylor | 13,167 | 49.8 | +4.5 |
| Labor hold | | Swing | −4.5 | |

=== Warrnambool ===
1985 Victorian state election: Warrnambool
| Party | Candidate | Votes | % | ±% |
|---|---|---|---|---|
| Liberal | Adam Kempton | 11,417 | 41.4 | −17.7 |
| National | John McGrath | 8,871 | 32.2 | +32.2 |
| Labor | Peter Cox | 7,265 | 26.4 | −8.6 |
| Total formal votes | | 27,553 | 99.0 | |
| Informal votes | | 288 | 1.0 | |
| Turnout | | 27,841 | 94.7 | |
Two-party-preferred result
| National | John McGrath | 18,130 | 65.8 | +0.7 |
| Labor | Peter Cox | 9,423 | 34.2 | −0.7 |
Two-candidate-preferred result
| National | John McGrath | 15,578 | 56.5 | +56.5 |
| Liberal | Adam Kempton | 11,975 | 43.5 | −21.6 |
| National gain from Liberal | | Swing | N/A | |

=== Werribee ===
1985 Victorian state election: Werribee
| Party | Candidate | Votes | % | ±% |
|---|---|---|---|---|
| Labor | Ken Coghill | 14,376 | 53.8 | −8.6 |
| Liberal | Thomas Hudson | 10,268 | 38.4 | +8.4 |
| Weekend Trading | Robert Wolstenholme | 2,083 | 7.8 | +7.8 |
| Total formal votes | | 26,727 | 97.8 | |
| Informal votes | | 592 | 2.2 | |
| Turnout | | 27,319 | 92.9 | |
Two-party-preferred result
| Labor | Ken Coghill | 15,021 | 56.2 | −10.4 |
| Liberal | Thomas Hudson | 11,706 | 43.8 | +10.4 |
| Labor hold | | Swing | −10.4 | |

=== Whittlesea ===
1985 Victorian state election: Whittlesea
| Party | Candidate | Votes | % | ±% |
|---|---|---|---|---|
| Labor | Max McDonald | 15,209 | 54.6 | +3.6 |
| Liberal | Haydn Gregson | 12,640 | 45.4 | +2.8 |
| Total formal votes | | 27,849 | 97.7 | |
| Informal votes | | 652 | 2.3 | |
| Turnout | | 28,501 | 94.4 | |
| Labor hold | | Swing | −1.1 | |

=== Williamstown ===
1985 Victorian state election: Williamstown
| Party | Candidate | Votes | % | ±% |
|---|---|---|---|---|
| Labor | Gordon Stirling | 19,014 | 68.8 | +0.6 |
| Liberal | David Allan | 8,633 | 31.2 | +5.3 |
| Total formal votes | | 27,647 | 96.2 | |
| Informal votes | | 1,094 | 3.8 | |
| Turnout | | 28,741 | 93.3 | |
| Labor hold | | Swing | −2.8 | |

== See also ==
- 1985 Victorian state election
- Members of the Victorian Legislative Assembly, 1985–1988
