= Richard Riordan (disambiguation) =

Richard Riordan (1930–2023) was an American businessman and the 39th mayor of Los Angeles, California

Richard Riordan may also refer to:

- Rick Riordan (born 1964), American author
- Richard Riordan (Australian politician) (born 1972), member of the Victorian Legislative Assembly for Polwarth
