= John Francis McGrath =

John Francis McGrath may refer to:

- John McGrath (New South Wales politician) (1893–1971)
- John McGrath (Victorian politician) (1939–2021)
