= James Deany =

Australian politician

James Davidson Deany (28 September 1877 – 20 March 1927) was an Australian politician.

He was born in Dennington to carpenter John Simpson Deany and Jane Davidson. He attended the local state school and became a shop assistant before working for Warrnambool Town Council as a sanitary fees collector. Around 1899 he married Isobel Jane Burall, with whom he had three children. He ran a bookshop and newsagency from around 1903. From 1911 to 1917 he was a member of Warrnambool City Council, serving as mayor from 1915 to 1916. In 1916 he won a by-election for the Victorian Legislative Assembly seat of Warrnambool, and soon joined the Economy faction of the Nationalist Party. He held his seat until his death in Warrnambool in 1927.

Victorian Legislative Assembly
| Preceded by John Murray | Member for Warrnambool; 1916–1927 | Succeeded by Henry Bailey |
