= James McDonald (Victorian Nationalist politician) =

Australian politician

James McDonald (20 May 1856 – 1933) was an Australian politician.

McDonald was born in Geelong to mason John McDonald and Catherine McIntyre (who were both born in Scotland). He was educated in Winchelsea and became a contractor and then a butcher at Inverleigh. He also ran orchards at Inverleigh and Colac. He served on Bannockburn Shire Council from 1888 to 1917, with four terms as president (1893–95, 1900–01, 1911–12, 1916–17).

In 1917 McDonald was elected to the Victorian Legislative Assembly for Polwarth, representing the Economy Party faction of the Nationalists. He was a minister without portfolio from 1924 to 1927. He held his seat until his death at Inverleigh on 15 August 1933. His nephew Allan McDonald succeeded him in the seat.

Victorian Legislative Assembly
Preceded by John Johnstone	Member for Polwarth; 1917–1933	Succeeded by Allan McDonald
