= Keith McGarvie =

Australian politician (1891–1969)

Keith McGarvie (13 March 1891 – 5 October 1969) was an Australian politician. He was a United Australia Party member of the Victorian Legislative Assembly from 1933 to 1935, representing the electorate of Warrnambool.

== Early life and election to parliament ==
McGarvie was born in Colac and educated at Pomborneit State School and Camperdown Grammar School. He fought in World War I, serving with the 8th battalion of the First Australian Imperial Force during the Gallipoli Campaign, and attaining the rank of sergeant. He was subsequently invalided home, and served as a recruiting officer at Camperdown. In 1922, McGarvie and his brother David inherited Greenwood, a 1200-acre Jersey cattle stud at Pomberneit. He was active in dairy and pastoral causes, serving as president of the Victorian branch of the Australian Jersey Herd Society, president of the Camperdown Pastoral and Agricultural Society, chairman of the Camperdown Glenormiston Dairy Company, the Western District Cooperative Company and the Co-operative Insurance Company of Australia, and as chief dairy cattle steward for the Royal Agricultural Society of Victoria.

McGarvie was a Shire of Heytesbury councillor from 1930 to 1936, and its president from 1935 to 1936. In November 1933, he was elected to the Victorian Legislative Assembly in a by-election for the seat of Warrnambool, following the resignation of James Fairbairn to enter federal politics. He defeated independent candidate and former Labor MP Henry Bailey after a tight flow of Country Party preferences. He had campaigned upon staunch support of the Argyle ministry, support for the Premiers' Plan, supporting private enterprise and decreasing taxation.

== In parliament ==
In 1934, there was some controversy around McGarvie's party membership prior to his 1933 preselection by the United Australia Party, when it was alleged by the Country Party that he had been a member of their party up until that time. McGarvie acknowledged that he had been receiving the party's newspaper and stated that he had been approached to stand for the Country Party at the previous election, but that he had declined the approach and denied the allegation that he had been a party member. McGarvie's denial of membership was disputed by the secretary of the local Country Party branch, who in turn denied that any approach had been made to McGarvie to stand for the previous election.

In parliament, McGarvie raised concerns about the need for unemployment relief and vocational education for young people, supported the protection of the Otway Ranges rainforest as a water catchment, advocated for water supply improvements to the Western District, and was dismissive of concerns about restoration of public service wages following the Great Depression. He raised concerns on a number of occasions about the welfare of those in the Aboriginal community at Framlingham, and advocated land tenure for residents there on individual acreage, a higher level of sustenance, and "a local committee of experienced farmers and other residents to control and advise the blacks in forming their allotments".

McGarvie ran for re-election at the 1935 state election, and while supporting the policies of the Argyle government, stated that he would "continue to exercise his freedom of thought on vital public questions". During his campaign, he raised issues about the state of public buildings in rural areas, suggested their renovation could be used as unemployment relief, and argued for temporary, rather than permanent, tariff protection for farmers, more freedom for private enterprise, and reiterated his continuing advocacy for a water supply scheme for the Western District. He was defeated by former member Bailey, who had stood as a Country Party candidate, making McGarvie one of only two sitting United Australia Party MPs to lose at that election.

== Later years ==
He unsuccessfully contested five further elections following his 1935 defeat: the 1937 and 1940 state elections in Warrnambool, a 1940 by-election in Polwarth, the 1952 election in Hampden, and the 1952 Legislative Council election in South Western Province.

In 1939, he suffered severe injuries to both legs when he fell from a buggy at Kennedys Creek after its horses bolted.

He died at Colac in 1969 and was buried at Camperdown Cemetery.

Victorian Legislative Assembly
Preceded by James Fairbairn	Member for Warrnambool; 1933–1935	Succeeded by Henry Bailey
