= Richard Riordan (Australian politician) =

Australian politician and businessman (born 1972)

Richard Riordan MP
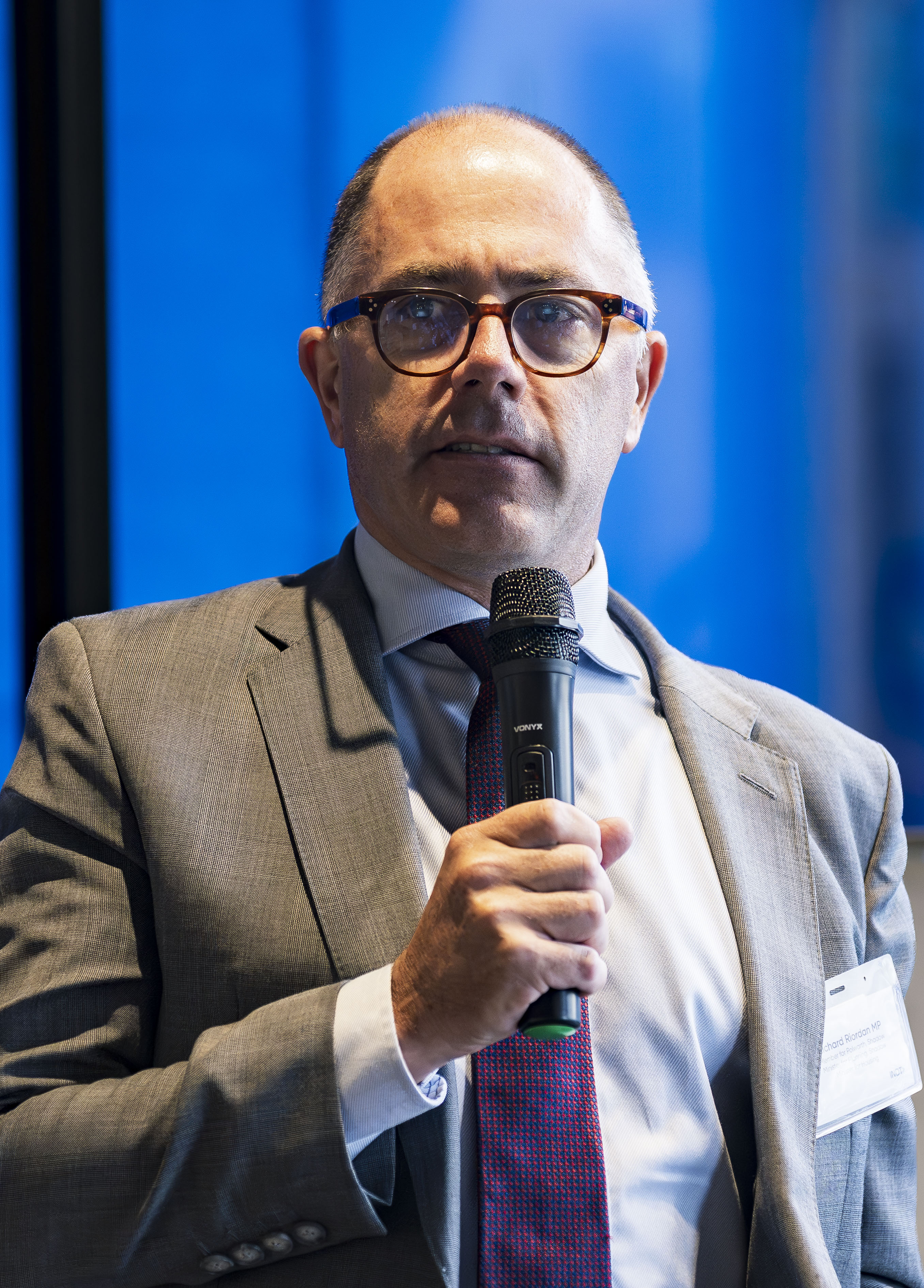

Member of the Victorian Legislative Assembly for Polwarth
- Incumbent
- Assumed office 31 October 2015
- Preceded by: Terry Mulder

Personal details
- Born: Richard Vincent Riordan; 11 April 1972 (age 54) Colac, Victoria
- Party: Liberal Party
- Spouse: Catherine Riordan (m. 1995)
- Children: 4
- Education: Monash University
- Website: richardriordan.com.au

Richard Vincent Riordan (born 11 April 1972) is an Australian politician and businessman. He was elected to the Victorian Legislative Assembly as a Liberal Party member for Polwarth, at a by-election held on 31 October 2015.

In 1989, he completed his Year 12 education in Calgary (Alberta, Canada) as a Rotary Exchange Student and, in 1990, completed his Victorian Certificate of Education at Trinity College Colac, where he was a prefect. He was admitted to Monash University to undertake a Bachelor of Business Management, where he was active in university politics, as well as the Young Liberal Movement.

After completing his studies in 1994, he was appointed managing director of his family's hardware business. In 1999, Riordan was nominated for Liberal Party pre-selection in the seat of Polwarth, being vacated by Ian Smith, but was defeated by Terry Mulder.

Riordan experienced another pre-selection defeat in 2010, but was successful in 2015, and won the by-election which followed the resignation of Mulder. Riordan was re-elected at the 2018 state election. Despite the Liberal Party experiencing a swing against it, Riordan slightly increased his primary vote, receiving in excess of 50% of the vote. After the election, he was appointed Assistant Shadow Minister for Agriculture and Regional Development and Deputy Chair of The Public Accounts and Estimates Committee.

Riordan has been a critic of wire rope barriers on county roads. In November 2019, he faced criticism for his comments after the death of a truck driver in accident on the Princes Highway when he was accused of using a fatality for political gain. However, his views were supported by some road transport groups.

Riordan was managing director of his family company, which had varied retail interests, and has previously served as director of the board of Colac Area Health. After the Liberal Party loss during the 2022 Victorian state election, Riordan announced his candidacy for the leadership of the party, but withdrew a few day later and announced his support for Brad Battin as leader.

Victorian Legislative Assembly
Preceded by Terry Mulder	Member for Polwarth; 2015–present	Incumbent
