= Allan McDonald (Australian politician) =

Australian politician (1888–1953)

The Honourable Allan McDonald DFC
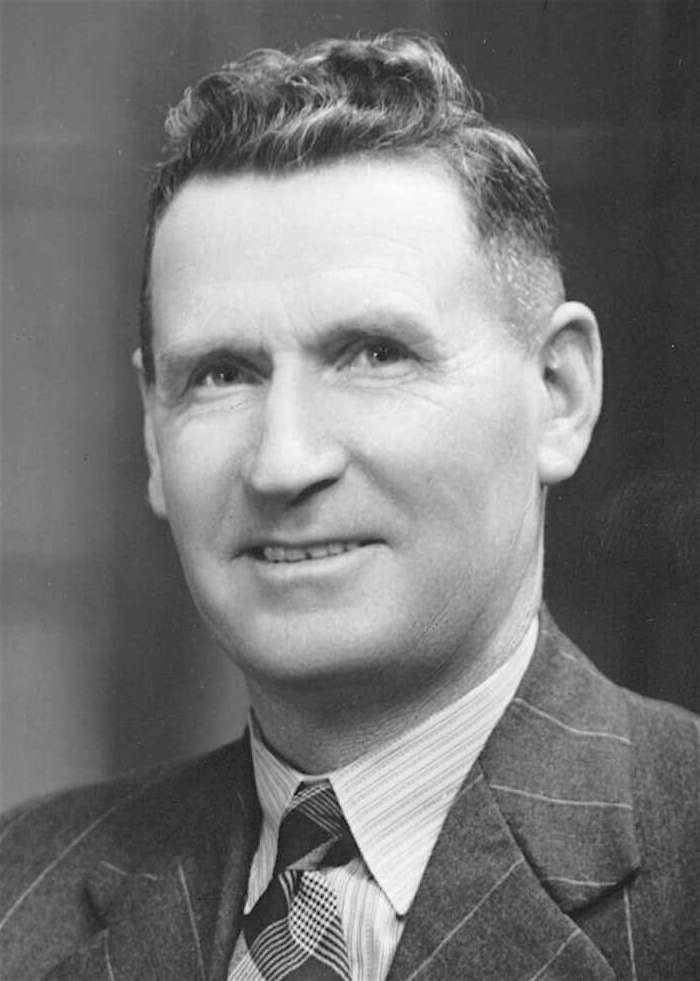

Minister for External Territories
- In office 26 June 1941 – 7 November 1941
- Prime Minister: Robert Menzies; Arthur Fadden
- Preceded by: Thomas Collins
- Succeeded by: James Fraser

Member of the Australian House of Representatives
- In office 21 September 1940 – 10 June 1953
- Preceded by: Geoffrey Street
- Succeeded by: Dan Mackinnon
- Constituency: Corangamite

Member of the Victorian Legislative Assembly
- In office 16 September 1933 – 23 August 1940
- Preceded by: James McDonald
- Succeeded by: Edward Guye
- Constituency: Polwarth

Personal details
- Born: 4 July 1888 Winchelsea, Victoria
- Died: 10 June 1953 (aged 64) Winchelsea, Victoria
- Party: UAP (to 1945); Liberal (from 1945)
- Spouse: Sarah May Farquharson
- Occupation: Soldier

Allan McKenzie McDonald, DFC (4 July 1888 – 10 June 1953) was an Australian politician who served in the House of Representatives from 1940 until his death in 1953. He served as Minister for External Territories in the Menzies and Fadden governments in 1941. McDonald represented the United Australia Party until 1945, when he joined the new Liberal Party. Before entering federal politics he had previously served in the Victorian Legislative Assembly from 1933 to 1940.

== Early life ==
McDonald was born on 4 July 1888 in Winchelsea, Victoria. He was the fourth child born to Elizabeth (née McKenzie) and Allan McDonald, both of whom were originally from Geelong. His uncle James McDonald was also a member of parliament. McDonald grew up on the family farm and attended the Winchelsea State School, subsequently working as a farm labourer and then acquiring his own property, "The Isles". His father was a member of the Winchelsea Shire Council until his death in 1914. He succeeded him on the council.

McDonald married Sarah Mary Farquharson at Birregurra on 17 September 1913. The couple had six children together, one of whom died in 1924 at a young age.

== Military service ==
McDonald enlisted in the Australian Imperial Force (AIF) in April 1916, with the rank of private. He left Melbourne in September aboard HMAT Port Sydney, and joined the 14th Battalion in France in December. McDonald was shot in the arm during the first attack on Bullecourt in April 1917. He spent several months in hospital, but subsequently participated in the Battle of Polygon Wood and was promoted sergeant. He later returned to Australia due to his injury and was discharged from the AIF in October 1918. On his journey home, he narrowly escaped being drowned when his boat was torpedoed.

== Politics ==
McDonald continued as a councillor on Winchelsea Shire Council, and unsuccessfully contested the House of Representatives seat of Corangamite in the 1919 Australian federal election and 1922 elections, representing the Nationalist Party. He gained political experience as a party organiser, and succeeded his deceased uncle James to the Victorian Legislative Assembly seat of Polwarth in 1933, representing the United Australia Party. Although considered a possible Victorian party leader, he resigned in 1940 to contest the federal election.

McDonald was successful in winning Corangamite for the UAP in 1940. He was minister for external territories in the governments of Robert Menzies and Arthur Fadden in 1941, and contested the UAP leadership in 1941 and 1943; he lost the 1941 ballot to Billy Hughes by one vote. McDonald was known as an advocate of benefits for returned servicemen. He joined the new Liberal Party in 1945, and was Chief Opposition Whip from 1946 to 1949. When the Coalition returned to power in 1949, he stepped back from prominence, confining himself to party room discussion; this may have been due to his ill health.

A devout Presbyterian and monarchist, McDonald died of cancer on 10 June 1953 at Winchelsea. He was given a state funeral.

Parliament of Victoria
Preceded by James McDonald	Member for Polwarth; 1933–1940	Succeeded by Edward Guye
Parliament of Australia
Preceded by Geoffrey Street	Member for Corangamite; 1940–1953	Succeeded by Dan Mackinnon
