= Electoral district of Warrnambool =

Former state electoral district of Victoria, Australia

Warrnambool Victoria—Legislative Assembly
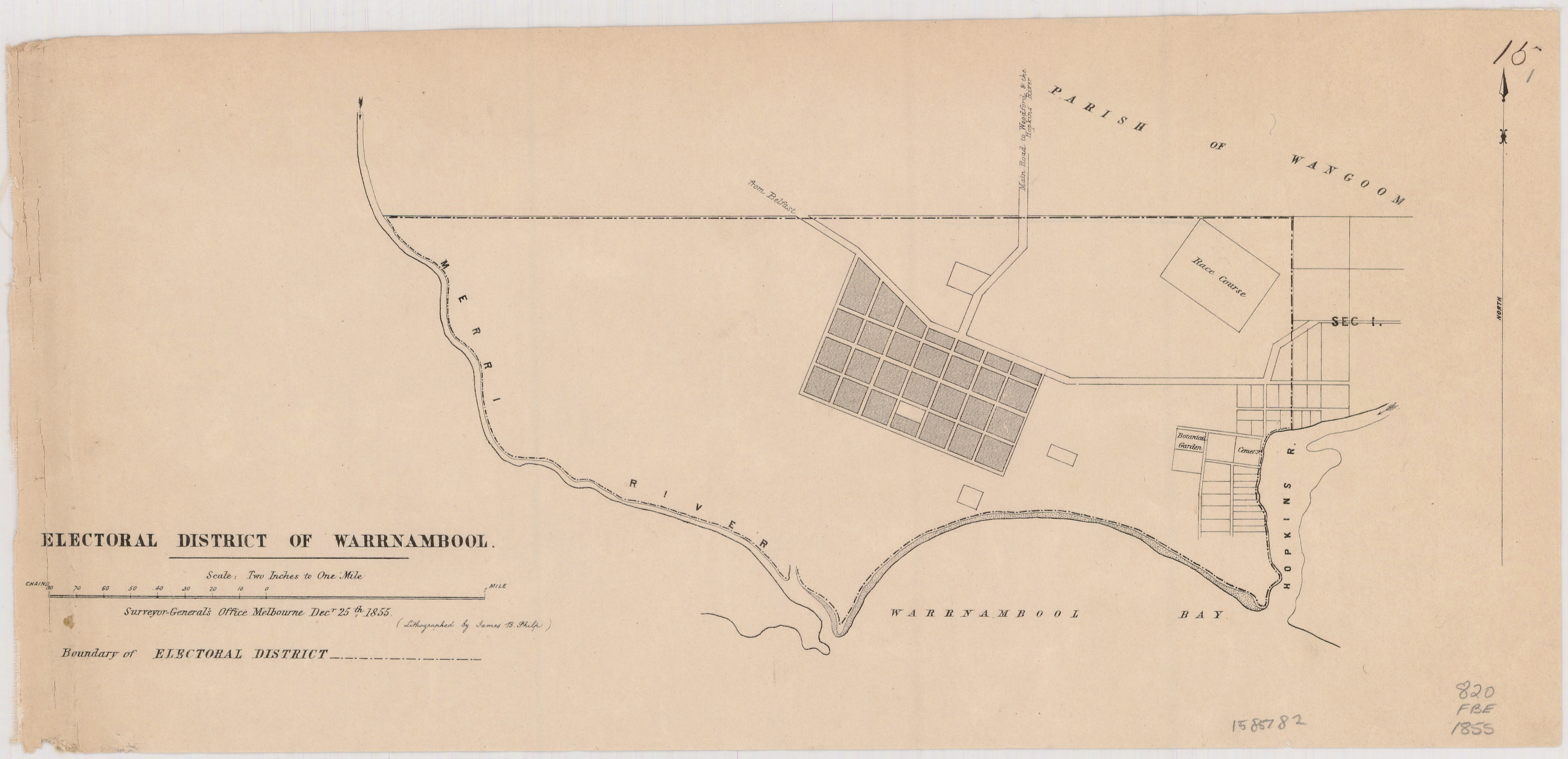
- Electoral District of Warrnambool, 1856
- State: Victoria
- Dates current: 1856–1955, 1967–2002
- Demographic: Urbanised Rural
- Coordinates: 38°23′S 142°29′E

The Electoral district of Warrnambool was an electoral district of the Victorian Legislative Assembly.

Between 1955 and 1967 the district was abolished and distributed between the Electoral district of Portland, Electoral district of Hampden and the Electoral district of Polwarth.

The city of Warrnambool was absorbed by the Electoral district of Portland

== Members for Warrnambool ==
First incarnation (1856–1955)
Member	Party	Term
George Horne		1856–1861
Thomas Manifold		1861
John Wood		1861–1864
John Dane		1864–1865
William Plummer		1866–1874
Sir James McCulloch		1874–1878
James Francis		1878–1884
John Murray		1884–1916
James Deany	Nationalist/Economy Party	1916–1927
Henry Bailey	Labor	1927–1932
James Fairbairn	United Australia	1932–1933
Keith McGarvie	United Australia	1933–1935
Henry Bailey	Country	1935–1950
Ronald Mack	Liberal	1950–1952
Malcolm Gladman	Labor	1952–1955
Second incarnation (1967–2002)
Ian Smith	Liberal	1967–1983
Adam Kempton	Liberal	1983–1985
John McGrath	National	1985–1999
John Vogels	Liberal	1999–2002

== See also ==
- Parliaments of the Australian states and territories
- List of members of the Victorian Legislative Assembly
