= Cec Burgin =

Australian politician

Cecil William John (Cec) Burgin (19 May 1923 – 1 November 2003) was an Australian politician. He was a Liberal Party member of the Victorian Legislative Assembly from 1970 to 1985, representing the electorate of Polwarth.

Burgin was born in Horsham, and attended Pimpinio State School and the Ballarat School of Mines, where he studied agricultural engineering. He worked on his family's property at Pimpinio after leaving school, but joined the Royal Australian Air Force during World War II. He trained in Canada and England, attaining the rank of flying officer, and served in India and South East Asia. He became a grazier at Port Campbell after the war. He was a Shire of Heytesbury councillor from 1953 to 1963, including a term as shire president in 1960.

Burgin was heavily involved in both his local community and the pastoral industry prior to entering politics. He was an active member of the Timboon Returned and Services League, captain of the local fire brigade, and a member of the local hospital board. In his industry, he was a delegate for the Australian Wool and Meat Producers Federation from 1966 to 1970, chairman of the Australian Prime Lamb Industry Panel until 1970, and chairman of the Victorian Prime Lamb Committee.

Burgin was elected to the Legislative Assembly at the 1970 state election, succeeding Tom Darcy in the safely conservative seat. He served on the Road Safety Committee from 1973 to 1979, the State Development Committee from 1979 to 1982, and the Natural Resources and Environment Committee from 1983 to 1985. He retired at the 1985 state election.

Burgin died in November 2003 in Tewantin, Queensland.

Parliament of Victoria
Preceded by Tom Darcy	Member for Polwarth; 1970–1985	Succeeded by Ian Smith
