= Tom Darcy (Australian politician) =

Australian politician

Thomas Anthony Darcy (18 May 1893 – 27 December 1979) was an Australian politician. He was a Liberal Party member of the Victorian Legislative Assembly from 1958 to 1970, representing the electorate of Polwarth. He was Minister of Water Supply and Minister of Mines in the Bolte government from 1964 to 1967.

Darcy was born at Murroon, near Birregurra. He was educated at Murroon State School, and became a farmer and grazier there after leaving school. He served for four years overseas in World War I, in Syria with the 4th Light Horse Regiment, and was a company commander of the Volunteer Defence Corps' 19th battalion in World War II. In his industry, he served as Victorian state president and national vice-president of the Australian Primary Producers Union, and was an employers' representative for the Pastoral and Agricultural Wages Board. Locally, he was a Shire of Winchelsea councillor from 1929 to 1959, serving as shire president three times, was president of the Winchelsea Returned and Services League and was a member of the local Soldier Settlement Advisory Commission.

Darcy was elected to the Legislative Assembly for the safe Liberal seat of Polwarth at the 1958 state election, and was re-elected in 1961, 1964 and 1967. He was appointed Minister of Water Supply and Minister of Mines in the Bolte government in 1964, serving until the 1967 election. He also served on the Population Distribution Committee from 1961 to 1963. Darcy retired at the 1970 state election.

Darcy died at Colac in December 1979, and was buried at Warncoort Cemetery.

Parliament of Victoria
Preceded by Edward Guye	Member for Polwarth; 1958–1970	Succeeded by Cec Burgin
