= Terry Mulder =

Australian politician

The Honourable Terry Mulder

Minister for Public Transport
- In office 2 December 2010 – 4 December 2014
- Premier: Ted Baillieu; Denis Napthine
- Preceded by: Martin Pakula
- Succeeded by: Jacinta Allan

Minister for Roads
- In office 2 December 2010 – 4 December 2014
- Premier: Ted Baillieu; Denis Napthine
- Preceded by: Tim Pallas
- Succeeded by: Luke Donnellan

Member of the Victorian Parliament for Polwarth
- In office 18 September 1999 – 3 September 2015
- Preceded by: Ian Smith
- Succeeded by: Richard Riordan

Personal details
- Born: Terence Wynn Mulder; 16 August 1952 (age 74) Colac, Victoria, Australia
- Party: Liberal Party
- Spouse: Susan Mulder

Terence Wynn Mulder (born 16 August 1952) is a former Australian politician. He was a Liberal member of the Victorian Legislative Assembly from 1999 to 2015, representing the Colac-based electorate of Polwarth. He served as Minister for Public Transport and Minister for Roads in the Baillieu and Napthine governments from 2010 to 2014.

Mulder was born in Colac, and attended Trinity College, but did not complete high school and began working as a laborer. He was employed by the Postmaster General's Office from 1967 to 1978 before going into business, serving as managing director of a property management company from 1978 to 1999. Mulder also worked as a consultant from 1994 to 1999.

== Political background ==
Mulder joined the Liberal Party in 1992, and was an active member of his local branch thereafter, serving as its vice-president from 1993 to 1995 and president from 1995 to 1999. He subsequently won preselection to contest the safe seat of Polwarth upon the resignation of long-serving Ian Smith. He was easily elected, and was a popular backbencher for most of his first term. Mulder was promoted to the ministry in a reshuffle ahead of the 2002 election, serving as Shadow Minister for Water Resources.

Mulder was easily re-elected at the 2002 election, despite a statewide routing of the Liberal Party and a challenge from renowned Geelong football player Paul Couch, who ran in Polwarth as a National Party candidate. The defeat of several shadow ministers opened up a number of vacancies in the shadow cabinet after the election, and Mulder was promoted to the position of Shadow Minister for Transport and Shadow Minister for Ports.

As Shadow Minister for Transport, Mulder became one of the highest-profile members of the opposition, leading attacks on cost blow-outs over the Regional Fast Rail project and the rebuilding of Spencer Street station, the badly delayed Craigieburn railway line extension and the controversial siting of the Marshall railway station. With the party continuing to generally struggle, however, Mulder began to be seen as a potential replacement for leader Robert Doyle.

Mulder was seen as an outside chance to become leader throughout 2005 and early 2006, and briefly emerged as a contender to succeed Doyle when he stepped down in May 2006. He was endorsed by Doyle as his chosen replacement, but withdrew when it became clear that Ted Baillieu, Doyle's chief rival, had the numbers to succeed him. Following the 2010 state election, In 2008 Mulder was one of the Liberal MPs to oppose the legalised abortion act introduced by the Brumby Government which saw abortion legal up to twenty four weeks and up to the moment of birth if two doctors grant approval.

=== Minister for Public Transport and Roads ===
Mulder was appointed the Minister for Public Transport and Minister for Roads in 2010.

As Minister for Public Transport, Mulder oversaw the Taxi Industry Inquiry, the creation of Public Transport Victoria, construction of the Regional Rail Link and new railway stations at Waurn Ponds and Epsom, the removal of five level crossings in Springvale, Mitcham and Sunshine, orders for 15 new X'Trapolis 100 trains and 43 V/Line VLocity railcars, the Bayside Rail upgrade, and the addition of more than 10,000 extra weekly train, tram and bus trips on the public transport network.

As Minister for Roads, Mulder introduced tougher penalties for hoon, drink and drug driving as part of a new Road Safety Strategy, abolished registration stickers on vehicles, established the Country Roads and Bridges Program, oversaw construction of the Ballarat West Link Road, Dingley Bypass and Koo Wee Rup Bypass and oversaw planning and upgrades of the Princes Highway between Traralgon and Sale, and between Geelong and Colac, the M80 Ring Road and the Western Highway (Victoria) between Ballarat and Ararat. Mulder also oversaw planning and development of the East West Link project.

=== Opposition and resignation ===
The 2014 Victorian state election saw the Coalition government defeated by the Labor Party after one term in government, while Mulder was re-elected for his fifth term as member for Polwarth. Along with seven other former ministers, he went to the backbench and did not take a position on the Coalition's shadow ministry. On 31 August 2015, Mulder announced that he would resign from the Victorian Parliament on 3 September, which triggered a by-election in his seat. Former Premier Denis Napthine had announced his resignation earlier on the same day.

Victorian Legislative Assembly
Preceded by Ian Smith	Member for Polwarth; 1999–2015	Succeeded by Richard Riordan
Political offices
Preceded by Martin Pakula	Minister for Public Transport; 2010–2014	Succeeded by Jacinta Allan
Preceded by Tim Pallas	Minister for Roads; 2010–2014	Succeeded by Luke Donnellan
