= Edward Guye =

Australian politician (1887–1960)

Minister of Transport
- In office 15 December 1949 – 27 June 1950
- Premier: Thomas Hollway
- Preceded by: Thomas Hollway
- Succeeded by: Herbert Hyland

Member of the Victorian Legislative Assembly for Polwarth
- In office 2 November 1940 – 18 April 1958
- Preceded by: Allan McDonald
- Succeeded by: Tom Darcy

Personal details
- Born: 12 November 1887 Brentford, Middlesex, England, United Kingdom
- Died: 4 July 1960 (aged 72) Winchelsea, Victoria, Australia
- Resting place: Winchelsea Cemetery
- Party: Country Party; Liberal and Country Party
- Spouse: Violet Wenden (m. 1906)
- Relations: Denis Guye (brother)

Military service
- Allegiance: Australia
- Branch/service: Australian Imperial Force
- Years of service: 1914–1918
- Rank: Corporal
- Unit: 8th Battalion
- Battles/wars: Gallipoli Campaign

Edward Fritz Guye (12 November 1887 – 4 July 1960) was an Australian politician who sat in the Victorian Legislative Assembly from 1940 to 1958.

Guye was born in Brentford, England, the son of Fritz Guye and his wife Gertrude Percy Ashton Glover. His father was a Swiss watchmaker who had settled in London. His father died in 1901 and Guye emigrated to Australia at the beginning of the 20th century. He enlisted in the AIF on 2 September 1914, and was sent to Europe in October. He returned to Australia in 1916.

In 1940, Guye was elected as Country Party representative for the Electoral district of Polwarth in the Victorian Legislative Assembly. In March 1949, Guye was one of six Country MPs to defect to the Liberal and Country Party established by Thomas Hollway as the Victorian division of the Liberal Party. In December 1949, he became Minister of Transport and a Vice-President of the Board of Land and Works.

Guye's brother Denis Guye, who remained in England, was an Olympic rower.

Victorian Legislative Assembly
Preceded by Allan McDonald	Member for Polwarth; 1940–1958	Succeeded by Tom Darcy
Political offices
Preceded by Thomas Hollway	Minister of Transport; 1949–1950	Succeeded by Herbert Hyland
