= 2015 Polwarth state by-election =

- 31 October 2015

Electoral district of Polwarth in the Victorian Legislative Assembly

	First party	Second party	Third party
Candidate	Richard Riordan	Joe Miles	David O'Brien
Party	Liberal	Greens	National
Popular vote	17,798	5,715	4,292
Percentage	49.6%	15.9%	12.0%
Swing	▼5.7pp	▲4.9pp	▲12.0pp
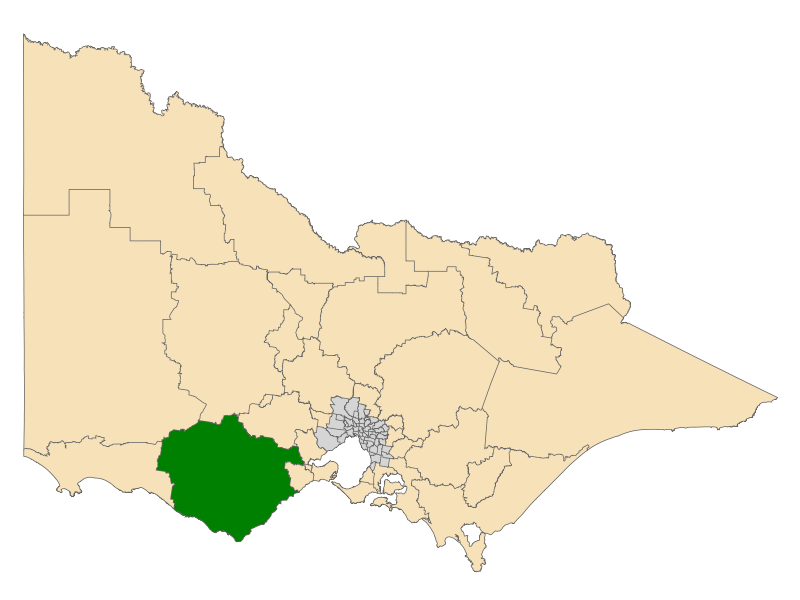
- The electoral district of Polwarth in south-west rural Victoria, west of Geelong, covers the Colac Otway and Corangamite local government areas (LGA), parts of the Moyne, Golden Plains and Surf Coast LGAs, and slivers of the Ararat and Greater Geelong LGAs, running along the Great Ocean Road.
MP before election
Terry Mulder
Liberal
Elected MP
Richard Riordan
Liberal

A by-election for the seat of Polwarth in the Victorian Legislative Assembly was held on 31 October 2015. The by-election was triggered by the resignation of Terry Mulder on 3 September 2015. Former Premier of Victoria, Denis Napthine, resigned his seat representing the adjacent district of South-West Coast on the same day as Mulder. The by-election for South-West Coast was held on the same day.

== Candidates ==
8 candidates in ballot paper order
Party	Candidate	Background
Greens	Joe Miles	Welfare officer & disability support, anti-fracking organiser in Victoria's South West & Barwon region.
Democratic Labour	Carmel Kavanagh	Leads a charity providing refugee advocacy, housing and resettlement assistance.
Country	Melinda Cass	Farmer from Cressy.
National	David O'Brien	Former member of the Victorian Legislative Council for Western Victoria Region.
Independent	Brendan Eckel	A Ballarat-based psychiatric nurse.
Sex Party	Meredith Doig	Company director and management consultant. Member of the university council for Federation University Australia. President of the Rationalist Society of Australia.
Liberal	Richard Riordan	Colac businessman, owner of Riordan Colac Hire, board member of the Corangamite Catchment Management Authority, former chairman of Colac Area Health board.
Christians	Geoff Rogers	Candidate for federal seat of Lalor at the 2013 federal election.

The Labor government did not contest the by-elections in the safe Liberal seats of Polwarth and South-West Coast.

== How-to-vote cards ==
Candidate volunteers attempt to distribute how-to-vote cards to voters at polling booths which show the candidate's suggested preference allocation. Candidates and parties which suggested preferences are shown in each column of the table below. The Australian Sex Party ran an open card at this by-election.

	Greens	DLP	Country	National	Eckel	Sex	Liberal	Christians
Greens	1	8	8	8	No card		6	7
DLP	7	1	3	4	No card		5	2
Country	6	4	1	7	No card		3	5
National	4	5	7	1	No card		2	3
Eckel	5	3	2	6	No card		7	6
Sex	2	7	4	5	No card	1	8	8
Liberal	3	6	6	2	No card		1	4
Christians	8	2	5	3	No card		4	1

== Result ==
Polwarth state by-election, 2015
Party	Candidate	Votes	%	±%
Liberal	Richard Riordan	17,798	49.6	−5.7
Greens	Joe Miles	5,715	15.9	+4.9
National	David O'Brien	4,292	12.0	+12.0
Democratic Labour	Carmel Kavanagh	2,911	8.1	+8.1
Sex Party	Meredith Doig	2,140	6.0	+6.0
Country	Melinda Cass	2,043	5.7	+0.1
Christians	Geoff Rogers	575	1.6	+1.6
Independent	Brendan Eckel	373	1.0	+1.0
Total formal votes		35,847	94.8	−1.3
Informal votes		1,950	5.2	+1.3
Turnout		37,797	86.2	−8.7
After distribution of preferences
Liberal	Richard Riordan	18,015	50.3	n/a
Greens	Joe Miles	5,855	16.3	n/a
National	David O'Brien	4,414	12.3	n/a
Democratic Labour	Carmel Kavanagh	3,126	8.7	n/a
Sex Party	Meredith Doig	2,251	6.3	n/a
Country	Melinda Cass	2,168	6.1	n/a
Liberal hold		Swing	n/a	

The VEC distributed preliminary preferences until a candidate exceeded 50 per cent of the vote, in this case Liberal candidate Richard Riordan.

== See also ==
- 2015 South-West Coast state by-election
- List of Victorian state by-elections
