= John Johnstone (Australian politician) =

Australian politician

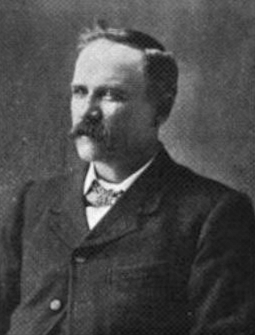

Member of the Victorian Legislative Assembly
- In office 1911–1917
- Constituency: Polwarth

Personal details
- Born: John Glass Johnstone; 20 May 1857 Geelong, Victoria, Australia
- Died: 2 October 1931 (aged 74) Colac, Victoria, Australia
- Political party: Nationalist
- Spouse: Jane Thomson Wilson (m. 1882)
- Children: 5

John Glass Johnstone (20 May 1857 – 2 October 1931) was an Australian politician.

== Biography ==
He was born in Geelong to saddler John Johnstone and Margaret Nicol. The family moved to Colac in 1867 and Johnstone was apprenticed to his father as a saddler. He soon purchased a tannery, and on 8 June 1882 married Jane Thomson Wilson, with whom he had five children. In 1883 he established an auctioneering, stock and station agency, and from 1901 to 1902 he served on Colac Shire Council. In 1911 he was elected to the Victorian Legislative Assembly as the Liberal member for Polwarth. He served until his resignation in 1917. Johnstone died in Colac in 1931.

Victorian Legislative Assembly
Preceded by Charles Forrest	Member for Polwarth; 1911–1917	Succeeded by James McDonald
