= Henry Bailey (Australian politician) =

Australian politician (1876–1962)

Henry Stephen Bailey (9 September 1876 – 26 July 1962) was an Australian politician. He was a member of the Victorian Legislative Assembly from 1914 to 1932 and from 1935 to 1950, representing the electorates of Port Fairy (1914–27) and Warrnambool (1927–32, 1935–50). Initially an Australian Labor Party member, he served as Minister for Lands and Water Supply in the Prendergast and Hogan governments of 1924, 1927–28 and 1929–32, but was expelled from the party in 1932 during the 1931-32 Labor split and defeated at that year's election. He joined the Country Party in 1934 and won his old seat back for his new party in 1935, subsequently serving as Minister Without Portfolio (1935–36), Minister of Labour (1936), Chief Secretary (1936–43) and Attorney-General (1938–43) in the Dunstan government.

== Early life and career ==
Bailey was born in Ballarat East to stoker Thomas William Bailey and Margaret Kemple, and was educated at a state school and St Patrick's College. He became a law clerk at Ballarat, but enlisted to fight in the Second Boer War in South Africa as a lieutenant with the Australian Commonwealth Horse 4th Battalion during 1902; in 1903, he moved to Port Fairy and continued his former business. He was a councillor of the Borough of Port Fairy from 1906 to 1915 and its mayor from 1912 to 1913 and secretary of the Port Fairy Racing Club and the Port Fairy and District Agricultural and Pastoral Association. He was also president of the local Political Labor Council and district council and a several-time member of the state executive of the Labor Party.

He married Blanche Mary Nicholson in February 1902, but she died in February 1914, four days after giving birth to twin sons. He remarried to Elizabeth Gibson in August 1928 and had two more sons and a daughter.

== Labor Party MP and minister ==
In 1914 he was elected to the Victorian Legislative Assembly as the Labor member for Port Fairy, moving to Warrnambool in 1927 after Port Fairy's abolition in a redistribution. In July 1924 he was appointed Minister of Lands and Water Supply, serving until November and again from May 1927 to November 1928 and from December 1929 to May 1932.

== Loss of Labor endorsement, defeat, expulsion and independent candidacy ==
Bailey was a firm ally of Premier Edmond Hogan, who supported the controversial Premiers' Plan involving austerity measures as a response to the Great Depression. The plan split the party federally and in most states (the 1931-32 Labor split), and when it was opposed by much of the Victorian party in 1932, Bailey stood with Hogan, declaring that he was "four square with Mr. Hogan on the Premiers' Plan" and cabling Hogan to tell him of his "unswerving loyalty". The state party retracted its endorsement of his candidacy for that year's election on 28 April, and he stood as an independent Labor candidate at the May election, but was defeated by James Fairbairn. Immediately following the party's disastrous result, the state executive required Bailey to show cause why he should not be expelled, and carried out that penalty later in the year.

Bailey applied for reinstatement at the party's January 1933 state conference, during which he pledged not to challenge an endorsed Labor candidate if rejected, but met with strong union resistance and was unsuccessful by a vote of 117–62. Fairbairn, who had defeated Bailey in 1932, resigned in 1933 to enter federal politics, and Bailey contested the resulting by-election as an independent. Bailey declared that his "great offence in the eyes of the political bosses" had been that he "placed his country before party" and had "committed the terrible crime of defying the bosses"; he denied having broken or infringed upon the Labor platform or policies. The Labor Party responded that he had "wilfully adopted a policy contrary to the decision of the ALP". Bailey had been a favourite to win the bitter by-election contest, but was defeated by Keith McGarvie. Following the result, Bailey lashed out at Labor voters for "practically giving the seat to anti-Labor" after underperforming on Labor preferences.

== Country Party MP and minister ==
Bailey joined the Country Party in 1934 and unsuccessfully contested the 1934 federal election in the seat of Wannon for his new party.

Bailey was re-elected to the Legislative Assembly for Warrnambool in 1935, being immediately appointed minister without portfolio. He was given the Labour portfolio in June 1936 and was promoted to Attorney-General in April 1938, serving until September 1943. He was being touted as a potential candidate for federal politics in 1948, but was badly defeated at the 1950 election, finishing third.

He later served as a trustee of the Melbourne Cricket Ground. Bailey died at St Kilda in 1962 and was buried at St Kilda Cemetery.
