= Adam Kempton =

Australian politician

Adam Kidman Kempton (born 20 October 1957) is a former Member of the Parliament of Victoria. He represented the electoral district of Warrnambool in the State of Victoria as a Liberal Member of the Legislative Assembly from 1983 to 1985.

Prior to entering Parliament, he had been admitted as a Barrister & Solicitor.

Subsequent to Parliament, he has remained active in business and public life. He was the Chairman of Commissioners of the City of Manningham from 1994 to 1997.

A campaigner on disability issues, Kempton is a board member of Realise Enterprises, a support group which provides training for people with a disability.

He lives in Warrnambool and is married to Janne Kempton.

Parliament of Victoria
Preceded by Ian Smith	Member for Warrnambool; 1983–1985	Succeeded by John McGrath
