= John McGrath (Victorian politician) =

Australian politician (1939–2021)

John Francis McGrath AM (7 September 1939 – 4 July 2021) was an Australian politician.

He was born in Victoria at Port Fairy, only son to Jack and Mollie. He grew up, with sisters Mary and Cath, on a dairy farm in Killarney and attended St. Brigids Primary School Crossley and St. Joseph's Christian Brothers College in Warrnambool. He married Eileen Barling in 1961 and they had 5 children, Darren, Shane, Sherry, Karen and Joanne. From 1963 he was a credit manager, becoming a commercial retail manager in 1967 and a small business operator in 1972. He was presented with a Warrnambool City Council Citizenship award in 1983 for service to the Community as Chair of the Foreshore Committee of Management, Chair of South West Credit Union, Chair of CBC School Council, Chair of Western Region Alcohol and Drug Centre. As a member of the National Party, he was elected to the Victorian Legislative Assembly in 1985 as the member for Warrnambool. In that year he was appointed National Party Spokesman for Housing, moving to Transport and Labour in 1988 with the additional responsibility of Party Whip. In 1992 he was appointed Deputy Speaker and Chairman of Committees, a post he held until his retirement from politics in 1999. His two sons were both impacted by mental health, his elder son Darren is today successfully living with the challenges of his mental health, but his younger son Shane died by suicide in 1993. These life experiences have seen John become engaged in advocating for families at state and national levels. He was the inaugural chair of Mental Health Australia, founding director and deputy chair of Beyond Blue, inaugural chair of the Mental Health Professionals Network, patron and former chair of the Victorian Mental Health Carers network (Tandem), board director of headspace and On the Line. Other involvements included Australian Health Ministers Advisory Council, Royal Australian and New Zealand College of Psychiatry, Private Psychiatric Services, Carers Victoria, Carers Australia, National Advisory Council for Suicide Prevention and Australian Rotary Health Foundation. John remarried in 1996, to Lyn Myers. John was made a Member of the Order of Australia in 2008 for services to mental health, Victorian Parliament and National Party of Australia.

McGrath died on 4 July 2021.

Victorian Legislative Assembly
Preceded by Adam Kempton	Member for Warrnambool; 1985–1999	Succeeded by John Vogels
