= Ian Smith (Australian politician) =

Australian politician

Ian Smith MLA

Member of the Legislative Assembly for Electoral district of Warrnambool
- In office 1967–1983
- Preceded by: New seat
- Succeeded by: Adam Kempton

Member of the Legislative Assembly for Electoral district of Polwarth
- In office 1985–1999
- Preceded by: Cec Burgin
- Succeeded by: Terry Mulder

Personal details
- Born: 25 November 1939 (age 86) Terang, Victoria
- Party: Liberal Party
- Education: Geelong Grammar School

Ian Winton Smith (born 25 November 1939) is a former Australian Liberal Party politician. He represented the Electoral district of Warrnambool in the State of Victoria as a Member of the Legislative Assembly (MLA) from 1967 until 1983. He resigned to contest Liberal Party pre-selection unsuccessfully for the Federal Division of Wannon, even though he would have been required to resign from the State Parliament only if he had been successful in the pre-selection. He later re-entered the Victorian Parliament as an MLA for the Electoral district of Polwarth from 1985 to 1999.

== Biography ==
Smith was born at Terang, Victoria, and educated at Terang Primary and Secondary Schools and Geelong Grammar School. He has a farming background, living at the "Gwinganna" family farm near Terang until his first marriage in 1967, when he purchased and moved to another farm, "Jingella", near Camperdown. He sold that farm in 1988 and moved, living in both Lorne and Melbourne. He joined the Liberal Party in 1957. He has been married twice, first to Jennifer Louise Bartlam with whom he has two sons, Edward and James. His second marriage to Anne Michelle Renshaw produced two daughters, Victoria and Jacqueline. He later produced a son with Cheryl Harris.

== Political career ==
His political career includes: Minister of Water Supply, 1970; Minister for Social Welfare, which he established and reformed child care 1970–1973; Minister for Youth, Sport and Recreation, which he established 1972–1973; Minister for Agriculture, 1973–1980, where he undertook many market reforms; Minister for Economic Development, which he established, 1980–1981; Minister for State Development, Decentralization and Tourism, 1980; Minister for Finance, 1992–1995, where he undertook many reforms to privatize public sector assets, reduce the public sector workforce by 23% and reduce state debt and liabilities.

Always a controversial MP, Smith was once seen as a future leader of the Liberal Party. He was sacked from Rupert Hamer's Cabinet, then reinstated three days later. In June 1981 Smith played a major role in forcing Hamer to leave the premiership. When Jeff Kennett became premier in a 1992 landslide, Smith was appointed Minister for Finance, but resigned from the Kennett cabinet because of legal action brought against him by Cheryl Harris who was pregnant with his child. He later won that legal action but retired from politics in 1999.

== Post-politics ==
Since politics, Smith has built a successful business career with company directorships and an agribusiness consultancy. In 2009, he was elected to the voluntary position of Chairman of the Corangamite Federal Electorate Council of the Liberal Party of Australia, Victorian Division.

Parliament of Victoria
| Preceded by New seat | Member for Warrnambool; 1967–1983 | Succeeded by Adam Kempton |
| Preceded by Cec Burgin | Member for Polwarth; 1985–1999 | Succeeded by Terry Mulder |
