= Electoral district of Polwarth =

State electoral district of Victoria, Australia

Polwarth Victoria—Legislative Assembly
- Interactive map of electoral district boundaries from the 2022 state election
- State: Victoria
- Created: 1889
- MP: Richard Riordan
- Party: Liberal
- Namesake: County of Polwarth
- Electors: 45,895 (2018)
- Area: 8,860 km^{2} (3,420.9 sq mi)
- Demographic: Rural
Electorates around Polwarth:
Lowan	Ripon	Eureka
South-West Coast	Polwarth	South Barwon; Bass Strait
Great Australian Bight	Bass Strait	Bass Strait

The electoral district of Polwarth is an electoral district of the Victorian Legislative Assembly. It is located in south-west rural Victoria, west of Geelong, and covers the Colac and Corangamite local government areas (LGA), parts of the Moyne, Golden Plains and Surf Coast LGAs, and slivers of the Ararat and Greater Geelong LGAs, running along the Great Ocean Road taking in Anglesea, Cape Otway, Peterborough, Aireys Inlet, Lorne, Wye River, Apollo Bay and Port Campbell, covering the inland towns of Winchelsea, Colac, Camperdown and Terang along the Princes Highway, and Inverleigh, Cressy, Lismore and Mortlake on the Hamilton Highway, and finally, includes the Otway Ranges and Lake Corangamite.

The seat has existed since 1889 and has always been held by conservative parties. The Liberal Party has held the seat continuously since 1970, although the Nationals have provided strong challenges on occasions, such as at the 1999 election when election night figures suggested retired AFL Footballer Paul Couch would win the seat. Ultimately, however, Couch failed to finish ahead of the Labor Party candidate and the Liberal candidate, Terry Mulder, won after receiving preferences from Couch.

The 2014 Victorian election saw the Liberal Terry Mulder retain his seat, with a 3.2% swing to Labor. Mulder resigned from parliament on 3 September 2015. The subsequent by-election, held on 31 October, saw Richard Riordan elected as the new member.

== Members for Polwarth ==
Member	Party	Term
Charles Forrest	Unaligned	1889–1894
Thomas Baker	Unaligned	1894–1897
Charles Forrest	Unaligned	1897–1911
John Johnstone	Commonwealth Liberal	1911–1917
James McDonald	Nationalist	1917–1929
James McDonald	Economy	1929–1931
James McDonald	United Australia	1931–1933
Allan McDonald	United Australia	1933–1940
Edward Guye	Country	1940–1950
Edward Guye	Liberal and Country	1950–1958
Tom Darcy	Liberal and Country	1958–1959
Tom Darcy	Liberal	1959–1970
Cec Burgin	Liberal	1970–1985
Ian Smith	Liberal	1985–1999
Terry Mulder	Liberal	1999–2015
Richard Riordan	Liberal	2015–

== Election results ==
2022 Victorian state election: Polwarth
Party	Candidate	Votes	%	±%
Liberal	Richard Riordan	19,540	42.5	−3.3
Labor	Hutch Hussein	13,484	29.3	−1.4
Greens	Hilary McAllister	7,661	16.7	+6.0
Ind. (Australia One)	Denes C. Borsos	2,017	4.4	+4.4
Family First	Hollie Hunter	1,166	2.5	+2.5
Animal Justice	Elisha Atchison	1,101	2.4	−1.3
Justice	Joseph Vincent Remenyi	1,033	2.3	+2.3
Total formal votes		46,002	95.8	+0.7
Informal votes		1,949	4.1	−0.7
Turnout		47,951	90.4	+8.3
Two-party-preferred result
Liberal	Richard Riordan	23,823	51.8	−0.2
Labor	Hutch Hussein	22,179	48.2	+0.2
Liberal hold		Swing	−0.2	

== Historical maps ==
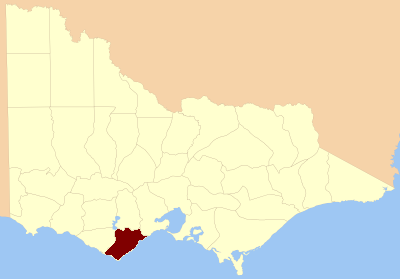
Location of Polwarth in Victoria, circa 1889

== See also ==
- 2015 Polwarth state by-election
