= Electoral results for the district of Box Hill =

Victoria, Australia, district election results

This is a list of electoral results for the Electoral district of Box Hill in Victorian state elections.

== Members for Box Hill ==
Member	Party	Term
Bob Gray	Labor	1945–1947
George Reid	Liberal	1947–1952
Bob Gray	Labor	1952–1955
(Sir) George Reid	Liberal	1955–1973
Morris Williams	Liberal	1973–1976
Donald Mackinnon	Liberal	1976–1982
Margaret Ray	Labor	1982–1992
Robert Clark	Liberal	1992–2018
Paul Hamer	Labor	2018–present

== Election results ==
=== Elections in the 2020s ===
2022 Victorian state election: Box Hill
Party	Candidate	Votes	%	±%
Labor	Paul Hamer	18,340	41.3	+0.4
Liberal	Nicole Werner	15,593	35.2	−8.9
Greens	Joanne Shan	6,267	14.1	+0.7
Democratic Labour	Paul Dean	1,083	2.4	+2.4
Animal Justice	Sebastian Folloni	824	1.9	+1.2
Family First	Gary Ong	809	1.8	+1.8
Freedom	Alicia Riera	541	1.2	+1.2
Independent	Wayne Tseng	464	1.0	+1.0
Independent	Cameron Liston	436	1.0	+1.0
Total formal votes		44,357	96.4	+0.8
Informal votes		1,635	3.6	−0.8
Turnout		45,992	90.5	+2.3
Two-party-preferred result
Labor	Paul Hamer	25,383	57.2	+4.1
Liberal	Nicole Werner	18,973	42.8	−4.1
Labor hold		Swing	+4.1	

=== Elections in the 2010s ===
2018 Victorian state election: Box Hill
Party	Candidate	Votes	%	±%
Liberal	Robert Clark	17,352	45.25	−5.89
Labor	Paul Hamer	15,360	40.05	+9.38
Greens	Sophia Sun	5,639	14.70	+0.22
Total formal votes		38,351	95.40	−0.85
Informal votes		1,850	4.60	+0.85
Turnout		40,201	91.40	−2.00
Two-party-preferred result
Labor	Paul Hamer	19,982	52.10	+7.80
Liberal	Robert Clark	18,369	47.90	−7.80
Labor gain from Liberal		Swing	+7.80	

2014 Victorian state election: Box Hill
Party	Candidate	Votes	%	±%
Liberal	Robert Clark	19,944	51.1	−2.4
Labor	Stefanie Perri	11,964	30.7	+1.8
Greens	Bill Pemberton	5,649	14.5	+0.3
Christians	Frank Reale	978	2.5	+2.5
Independent	Geoffrey Stokie	470	1.2	+1.2
Total formal votes		39,005	96.2	−0.5
Informal votes		1,520	3.8	+0.5
Turnout		40,525	93.4	−0.4
Two-party-preferred result
Liberal	Robert Clark	21,744	55.7	−3.7
Labor	Stefanie Perri	17,298	44.3	+3.7
Liberal hold		Swing	−3.7	

2010 Victorian state election: Box Hill
Party	Candidate	Votes	%	±%
Liberal	Robert Clark	20,415	58.31	+8.82
Labor	Peter Chandler	8,978	25.64	−7.11
Greens	Timothy Baxter	4,952	14.14	+0.03
Family First	Gary Ong	666	1.90	−0.76
Total formal votes		35,011	96.81	+0.13
Informal votes		1,155	3.19	−0.13
Turnout		36,166	92.98	+0.11
Two-party-preferred result
Liberal	Robert Clark	22,346	63.80	+8.58
Labor	Peter Chandler	12,677	36.20	−8.58
Liberal hold		Swing	+8.58	

=== Elections in the 2000s ===
2006 Victorian state election: Box Hill
Party	Candidate	Votes	%	±%
Liberal	Robert Clark	16,872	49.49	+2.70
Labor	Robert Chong	11,165	32.75	−4.76
Greens	Peter Campbell	4,809	14.11	−1.59
Family First	Gary Ong	908	2.66	+2.66
People Power	Christine Cummins	339	0.99	+0.99
Total formal votes		34,093	96.68	−0.63
Informal votes		1,171	3.32	+0.63
Turnout		35,264	92.87	−0.53
Two-party-preferred result
Liberal	Robert Clark	18,827	55.22	+4.13
Labor	Robert Chong	15,267	44.78	−4.13
Liberal hold		Swing	+4.13	

2002 Victorian state election: Box Hill
Party	Candidate	Votes	%	±%
Liberal	Robert Clark	15,935	46.79	−9.34
Labor	Robert Chong	12,777	37.51	−1.96
Greens	Helen Harris	5,347	15.70	+15.70
Total formal votes		34,059	97.31	−0.56
Informal votes		943	2.69	+0.56
Turnout		35,002	93.40	+1.05
Two-party-preferred result
Liberal	Robert Clark	17,424	51.19	−6.41
Labor	Robert Chong	16,614	48.81	+6.41
Liberal hold		Swing	−6.41	

=== Elections in the 1990s ===
1999 Victorian state election: Box Hill
Party	Candidate	Votes	%	±%
Liberal	Robert Clark	17,299	56.1	−3.0
Labor	Claire Thorn	12,166	39.5	+1.2
Hope	June Walters	1,356	4.4	+4.4
Total formal votes		30,821	97.9	−0.4
Informal votes		671	2.1	+0.4
Turnout		31,492	92.4	
Two-party-preferred result
Liberal	Robert Clark	17,754	57.6	−2.7
Labor	Claire Thorn	13,067	42.4	+2.7
Liberal hold		Swing	−2.7	

1996 Victorian state election: Box Hill
Party	Candidate	Votes	%	±%
Liberal	Robert Clark	18,270	59.1	−1.2
Labor	Rod Beecham	11,826	38.3	+5.6
Natural Law	Graeme Browne	798	2.6	+2.6
Total formal votes		30,894	98.3	+1.0
Informal votes		541	1.7	−1.0
Turnout		31,435	93.7	
Two-party-preferred result
Liberal	Robert Clark	18,623	60.3	−2.9
Labor	Rod Beecham	12,243	39.7	+2.9
Liberal hold		Swing	−2.9	

1992 Victorian state election: Box Hill
Party	Candidate	Votes	%	±%
Liberal	Robert Clark	18,547	60.3	+5.1
Labor	Margaret Ray	10,066	32.7	−8.7
Independent	John Baird	1,843	6.0	+6.0
Independent	David Shimmins	307	1.0	+1.0
Total formal votes		30,763	97.3	+0.2
Informal votes		850	2.7	−0.2
Turnout		31,613	95.3	
Two-party-preferred result
Liberal	Robert Clark	19,423	63.2	+6.2
Labor	Margaret Ray	11,298	36.8	−6.2
Liberal hold		Swing	+6.2	

=== Elections in the 1980s ===
1988 Victorian state election: Box Hill
Party	Candidate	Votes	%	±%
Labor	Margaret Ray	12,460	47.46	−3.32
Liberal	Helen Shardey	11,142	42.44	−2.26
Democrats	George Demetriou	1,128	4.30	+4.30
Call to Australia	William Watson	974	3.71	+3.71
Independent	Peter Allan	551	2.10	−2.42
Total formal votes		26,255	97.00	−1.08
Informal votes		812	3.00	+1.08
Turnout		27,067	92.90	−0.43
Two-party-preferred result
Labor	Margaret Ray	13,669	52.09	+0.24
Liberal	Helen Shardey	12,574	47.91	−0.24
Labor hold		Swing	+0.24	

1985 Victorian state election: Box Hill
Party	Candidate	Votes	%	±%
Labor	Margaret Ray	14,336	50.8	+2.3
Liberal	George Cox	12,621	44.7	+4.5
Independent	Peter Allan	1,277	4.5	+0.8
Total formal votes		28,234	98.1	
Informal votes		553	1.9	
Turnout		28,787	93.3	
Two-party-preferred result
Labor	Margaret Ray	14,710	52.1	−3.4
Liberal	George Cox	13,524	47.9	+3.4
Labor hold		Swing	−3.4	

1982 Victorian state election: Box Hill
Party	Candidate	Votes	%	±%
Labor	Margaret Ray	12,214	46.4	+6.3
Liberal	Donald Mackinnon	10,980	41.7	−5.7
Democrats	Reginald Jones	1,851	7.0	−5.4
Independent	Peter Allan	1,259	4.8	+4.8
Total formal votes		26,304	98.1	+0.3
Informal votes		510	1.9	−0.3
Turnout		26,814	94.4	+1.6
Two-party-preferred result
Labor	Margaret Ray	14,082	53.5	+7.1
Liberal	Donald Mackinnon	12,222	46.5	−7.1
Labor gain from Liberal		Swing	+7.1	

=== Elections in the 1970s ===
1979 Victorian state election: Box Hill
Party	Candidate	Votes	%	±%
Liberal	Donald Mackinnon	12,426	47.4	−6.4
Labor	Adrian Moore	10,504	40.1	+1.2
Democrats	Esther Poelman	3,255	12.4	+12.4
Total formal votes		26,185	97.8	−0.1
Informal votes		583	2.2	+0.1
Turnout		26,768	92.8	+0.2
Two-party-preferred result
Liberal	Donald Mackinnon	14,035	53.6	−6.0
Labor	Adrian Moore	12,150	46.4	+6.0
Liberal hold		Swing	−6.0	

1976 Victorian state election: Box Hill
Party	Candidate	Votes	%	±%
Liberal	Donald Mackinnon	14,089	53.8	+5.0
Labor	Howard Hodgens	10,191	38.9	−0.2
Democratic Labor	James Brosnan	1,890	7.2	+0.9
Total formal votes		26,170	97.9	
Informal votes		550	2.1	
Turnout		26,720	92.6	
Two-party-preferred result
Liberal	Donald Mackinnon	15,601	59.6	+2.5
Labor	Howard Hodgens	10,869	40.4	−2.5
Liberal hold		Swing	+2.5	

1973 Victorian state election: Box Hill
Party	Candidate	Votes	%	±%
Liberal	Morris Williams	22,201	52.2	+8.5
Labor	Keith Remington	14,667	34.5	−2.5
Democratic Labor	James Brosnan	3,180	7.5	−5.8
Australia	John Franceschini	2,459	5.8	+5.8
Total formal votes		42,507	97.9	+0.4
Informal votes		907	2.1	−0.4
Turnout		43,414	94.1	−1.2
Two-party-preferred result
Liberal	Morris Williams	25,886	60.9	−0.1
Labor	Keith Remington	16,619	39.1	+0.1
Liberal hold		Swing	−0.1	

1970 Victorian state election: Box Hill
Party	Candidate	Votes	%	±%
Liberal	George Reid	15,356	45.6	−3.3
Labor	Maurice Sevior	12,451	37.0	+4.7
Democratic Labor	James Marmion	4,482	13.3	−2.3
Independent	John Clarkson	1,365	4.1	+4.1
Total formal votes		32,792	97.5	−0.2
Informal votes		862	2.5	+0.2
Turnout		33,654	95.3	+0.7
Two-party-preferred result
Liberal	George Reid	20,521	61.0	−3.5
Labor	Maurice Sevior	12,271	39.0	+3.5
Liberal hold		Swing	−3.5	

=== Elections in the 1960s ===
1967 Victorian state election: Box Hill
Party	Candidate	Votes	%	±%
Liberal	George Reid	13,185	48.9	−3.8
Labor	Frank Walsh	8,714	32.3	+0.2
Democratic Labor	Edmund Burgi	4,205	15.6	+0.6
Independent	Rodney Northover	849	3.1	+3.1
Total formal votes		26,953	97.7	
Informal votes		641	2.3	
Turnout		27,594	94.6	
Two-party-preferred result
Liberal	George Reid	17,395	64.5	−1.2
Labor	Frank Walsh	9,558	35.5	+1.2
Liberal hold		Swing	−1.2	

1964 Victorian state election: Box Hill
Party	Candidate	Votes	%	±%
Liberal and Country	George Reid	19,356	55.0	−0.2
Labor	Charles Mathews	10,555	30.0	+2.0
Democratic Labor	Edmund Burgi	5,300	15.0	−1.8
Total formal votes		35,211	98.4	+0.2
Informal votes		565	1.6	−0.2
Turnout		35,776	94.8	+0.9
Two-party-preferred result
Liberal and Country	George Reid	23,861	67.8	−1.7
Labor	Charles Mathews	11,350	32.2	+1.7
Liberal and Country hold		Swing	−1.7	

1961 Victorian state election: Box Hill
Party	Candidate	Votes	%	±%
Liberal and Country	George Reid	15,546	55.2	−3.0
Labor	William O'Grady	7,873	28.0	−2.3
Democratic Labor	Edmund Burgi	4,717	16.8	+5.4
Total formal votes		28,143	98.2	−0.5
Informal votes		525	1.8	+0.5
Turnout		28,661	93.9	0.0
Two-party-preferred result
Liberal and Country	George Reid	19,557	69.5	+1.5
Labor	William O'Grady	8,579	30.5	−1.5
Liberal and Country hold		Swing	+1.5	

=== Elections in the 1950s ===
1958 Victorian state election: Box Hill
Party	Candidate	Votes	%	±%
Liberal and Country	George Reid	13,013	58.2	
Labor	William Betton	6,774	30.3	
Democratic Labor	Edmund Burgi	2,556	11.4	
Total formal votes		22,343	98.7	
Informal votes		294	1.3	
Turnout		22,637	93.9	
Two-party-preferred result
Liberal and Country	George Reid	15,185	68.0	
Labor	William Betton	7,158	32.0	
Liberal and Country hold		Swing		

1955 Victorian state election: Box Hill
Party	Candidate	Votes	%	±%
Liberal and Country	George Reid	13,073	45.9	
Labor	Bob Gray	9,969	35.0	
Independent	Leslie McCredden	2,854	10.0	
Labor (A-C)	Maurice Weston	1,986	7.0	
Independent	Leslie Bawden	624	2.2	
Total formal votes		28,506	97.7	
Informal votes		668	2.3	
Turnout		29,174	94.0	
Two-party-preferred result
Liberal and Country	George Reid	16,166	56.7	
Labor	Bob Gray	12,340	43.3	
Liberal and Country gain from Labor		Swing		

1952 Victorian state election: Box Hill
Party	Candidate	Votes	%	±%
Labor	Bob Gray	17,661	52.2	+7.6
Liberal and Country	George Reid	12,987	38.3	−17.1
Independent	Lyndhurst Mullett	3,218	9.5	+9.5
Total formal votes		33,866	98.4	−0.8
Informal votes		560	1.6	+0.8
Turnout		34,426	93.4	−1.0
Two-party-preferred result
Labor	Bob Gray	18,305	54.0	+9.4
Liberal and Country	George Reid	15,561	46.0	−9.4
Labor gain from Liberal and Country		Swing	+9.4	

1950 Victorian state election: Box Hill
Party	Candidate	Votes	%	±%
Liberal and Country	George Reid	15,942	55.4	+11.2
Labor	Bob Gray	12,819	44.6	+5.8
Total formal votes		28,761	99.2	+0.2
Informal votes		220	0.8	−0.2
Turnout		28,981	94.4	+0.7
Liberal and Country hold		Swing	−3.0	

=== Elections in the 1940s ===
1947 Victorian state election: Box Hill
Party	Candidate	Votes	%	±%
Liberal	George Reid	11,260	44.2	+6.5
Labor	Bob Gray	9,872	38.8	−12.2
Independent Liberal	Reginald Cooper	4,346	17.1	+17.1
Total formal votes		25,478	99.0	+0.5
Informal votes		267	1.0	−0.5
Turnout		25,745	93.7	+5.4
Two-party-preferred result
Liberal	George Reid	14,885	58.4	
Labor	Bob Gray	10,593	41.6	
Liberal gain from Labor		Swing	N/A	

1945 Victorian state election: Box Hill
Party	Candidate	Votes	%	±%
Labor	Bob Gray	11,204	51.0	
Liberal	Ronald Emerson	8,287	37.7	
Independent	Ivy Weber	2,490	11.3	
Total formal votes		21,981	98.8	
Informal votes		259	1.2	
Turnout		22,240	88.3	
Labor hold		Swing		

- Preferences were not distributed.
