= Electoral results for the district of Werribee =

Victoria, Australia, district election results

This is a list of electoral results for the district of Werribee in Victorian state elections.

== Members for Werribee ==
First incarnation (1976–2002)
Member	Party	Term
Neville Hudson	Liberal	1976–1979
Ken Coghill	Labor	1979–1996
Mary Gillett	Labor	1996–2002
Second incarnation (2014–present)
Member	Party	Term
Tim Pallas	Labor	2014–2025
John Lister	Labor	2025–present

== Election results ==
=== Elections in the 2020s ===
==== 2025 by-election ====
2025 Werribee state by-election
Party	Candidate	Votes	%	±%
Liberal	Steve Murphy	12,207	28.98	+3.65
Labor	John Lister	12,168	28.89	−16.47
Independent	Paul Hopper	6,134	14.56	+8.66
Greens	Rifai A. Raheem	3,190	7.57	+0.80
Victorian Socialists	Sue Munro	3,008	7.14	+3.54
Legalise Cannabis	Xavier Menta	2,316	5.50	+5.50
Family First	Matt Emerson	1,827	4.34	+1.84
Animal Justice	Shohre Mansouri Jajaee	401	0.95	−0.94
Independent	Munish Joshi	352	0.84	+0.84
Independent	Aidan McLindon	270	0.64	+0.64
Independent	Aijaz Moinuddin	164	0.39	+0.39
Independent	Kodei Mulcahy	80	0.19	+0.19
Total formal votes		42,117	93.34	+3.06
Informal votes		3,003	6.66	−3.06
Turnout		45,120	79.91	−5.67
Two-party-preferred result
Labor	John Lister	21,405	50.82	−10.10
Liberal	Steve Murphy	20,712	49.18	+10.10
Labor hold		Swing	−10.10	

==== 2022 ====
2022 Victorian state election: Werribee
Party	Candidate	Votes	%	±%
Labor	Tim Pallas	17,512	45.4	−0.6
Liberal	Mia Shaw	9,779	25.3	+8.7
Greens	Jack Boddeke	2,613	6.8	+0.3
Independent	Paul Hopper	2,278	5.9	+5.9
Victorian Socialists	Sue Munro	1,391	3.6	+3.6
Family First	Matthew Emerson	964	2.5	+2.5
Democratic Labour	Kathryn Breakwell	767	2.0	−1.2
Animal Justice	Josh Segrave	730	1.9	+1.9
Justice	Patricia Anne Wicks	709	1.8	+1.8
Freedom	Mark Strother	663	1.7	+1.7
Transport Matters	Trevor Russell Collins	360	0.9	+0.9
New Democrats	Prashant Tandon	319	0.8	+0.8
Health Australia	Karen Hogan	260	0.7	+0.7
Independent	Patrizia Barcatta	213	0.6	+0.6
Independent	Heni Cazlynn Kwan	45	0.1	+0.1
Total formal votes		38,603	90.3	−2.9
Informal votes		4,156	9.7	+2.9
Turnout		42,759	85.6	+4.5
Two-party-preferred result
Labor	Tim Pallas	23,517	60.9	−2.4
Liberal	Mia Shaw	15,086	39.1	+2.4
Labor hold		Swing	−2.4	

=== Elections in the 2010s ===
==== 2018 ====
2018 Victorian state election: Werribee
Party	Candidate	Votes	%	±%
Labor	Tim Pallas	17,539	45.41	−11.20
Independent	Joe Garra	7,685	19.90	+19.90
Liberal	Gayle Murphy	6,641	17.19	−11.55
Greens	Jay Dessi	2,522	6.53	−1.96
Independent	Rachel Carling-Jenkins	2,086	5.40	+5.40
Democratic Labour	Kathryn Breakwell	1,175	3.04	+3.04
Independent	Pratibha Sharma	628	1.63	+1.63
Independent	Thanh Nga Ly	346	0.90	+0.90
Total formal votes		38,622	93.25	−0.38
Informal votes		2,796	6.75	+0.38
Turnout		41,418	89.49	−3.25
Two-party-preferred result
Labor	Tim Pallas	24,209	62.55	−3.10
Liberal	Gayle Murphy	14,494	37.45	+3.10
Two-candidate-preferred result
Labor	Tim Pallas	22,701	58.78	−6.92
Independent	Joe Garra	15,921	41.22	+41.22
Labor hold		Swing	N/A	

==== 2014 ====
2014 Victorian state election: Werribee
Party	Candidate	Votes	%	±%
Labor	Tim Pallas	20,338	56.6	+8.1
Liberal	Tarun Singh	10,327	28.7	−3.7
Greens	Bro Sheffield-Brotherton	3,049	8.5	−0.9
Christians	Anne Okumu	1,167	3.2	+3.2
Voice for the West	Nhan Hoang Tran	1,045	2.9	+2.9
Total formal votes		35,926	93.6	−0.6
Informal votes		2,446	6.4	+0.6
Turnout		38,372	92.7	−1.0
Two-party-preferred result
Labor	Tim Pallas	23,607	65.7	+4.2
Liberal	Tarun Singh	12,349	34.4	−4.2
Labor hold		Swing	+4.2	

=== Elections in the 1990s ===
==== 1999 ====
1999 Victorian state election: Werribee
Party	Candidate	Votes	%	±%
Labor	Mary Gillett	22,652	59.1	+12.8
Liberal	David McLaren	14,120	36.9	−6.7
Greens	Cynthia Manson	913	2.4	+2.4
Independent	Gary Impson	353	0.9	+0.9
Independent	Batman Backhouse	258	0.7	+0.7
Total formal votes		38,296	96.9	−0.6
Informal votes		1,221	3.1	+0.6
Turnout		39,517	94.9	
Two-party-preferred result
Labor	Mary Gillett	23,540	61.5	+10.7
Liberal	David McLaren	14,754	38.5	−10.7
Labor hold		Swing	+10.7	

==== 1996 ====
1996 Victorian state election: Werribee
Party	Candidate	Votes	%	±%
Labor	Mary Douglas	16,395	46.4	−2.2
Liberal	Trish Vejby	15,396	43.6	+8.8
Independent	Dennis McIntosh	3,560	10.1	+10.1
Total formal votes		35,351	97.5	+0.4
Informal votes		908	2.5	−0.4
Turnout		36,259	95.1	
Two-party-preferred result
Labor	Mary Douglas	17,943	50.8	−7.5
Liberal	Trish Vejby	17,386	49.2	+7.5
Labor hold		Swing	−7.5	

==== 1992 ====
1992 Victorian state election: Werribee
Party	Candidate	Votes	%	±%
Labor	Ken Coghill	14,857	48.6	−6.8
Liberal	Anne Canterbury	10,632	34.8	+3.3
Independent	Shane Bourke	5,102	16.7	+16.7
Total formal votes		30,591	97.1	+0.5
Informal votes		927	2.9	−0.5
Turnout		31,518	96.5	
Two-party-preferred result
Labor	Ken Coghill	17,797	58.3	−1.7
Liberal	Anne Canterbury	12,729	41.7	+1.7
Labor hold		Swing	−1.7	

=== Elections in the 1980s ===
==== 1988 ====
1988 Victorian state election: Werribee
Party	Candidate	Votes	%	±%
Labor	Ken Coghill	18,788	56.21	+2.42
Liberal	Alexander Mather	10,509	31.44	−6.98
Independent	John Gibbons	4,125	12.34	+12.34
Total formal votes		33,421	96.22	−1.71
Informal votes		1,350	3.88	+1.71
Turnout		34,772	94.10	+1.25
Two-party-preferred result
Labor	Ken Coghill	20,204	60.51	+4.05
Liberal	Alexander Mather	13,187	39.49	−4.05
Labor hold		Swing	+4.05	

==== 1985 ====
1985 Victorian state election: Werribee
Party	Candidate	Votes	%	±%
Labor	Ken Coghill	14,376	53.8	−8.6
Liberal	Thomas Hudson	10,268	38.4	+8.4
Weekend Trading	Robert Wolstenholme	2,083	7.8	+7.8
Total formal votes		26,727	97.8	
Informal votes		592	2.2	
Turnout		27,319	92.9	
Two-party-preferred result
Labor	Ken Coghill	15,021	56.2	−10.4
Liberal	Thomas Hudson	11,706	43.8	+10.4
Labor hold		Swing	−10.4	

==== 1982 ====
1982 Victorian state election: Werribee
Party	Candidate	Votes	%	±%
Labor	Ken Coghill	24,932	64.7	+8.4
Liberal	John Kelly	10,782	28.0	−9.4
Democrats	Ivan Pollock	2,838	7.4	+7.4
Total formal votes		38,552	97.4	+0.1
Informal votes		1,044	2.6	−0.1
Turnout		39,596	94.3	+1.0
Two-party-preferred result
Labor	Ken Coghill	26,566	68.9	+10.8
Liberal	John Kelly	11,986	31.1	−10.8
Labor hold		Swing	+10.8	

=== Elections in the 1970s ===
==== 1979 ====
1979 Victorian state election: Werribee
Party	Candidate	Votes	%	±%
Labor	Ken Coghill	17,653	56.3	+7.5
Liberal	Stuart Southwick	11,728	37.4	−9.6
Independent	Charles Skidmore	1,962	6.3	+6.3
Total formal votes		31,343	97.3	−0.2
Informal votes		880	2.7	+0.2
Turnout		32,223	93.3	+1.6
Two-party-preferred result
Labor	Ken Coghill	18,214	58.1	+8.2
Liberal	Stuart Southwick	13,129	41.9	−8.2
Labor gain from Liberal		Swing	+8.2	

==== 1976 ====
1976 Victorian state election: Werribee
Party	Candidate	Votes	%	±%
Labor	Anthony Robinson	12,422	48.8	0.0
Liberal	Neville Hudson	11,959	47.0	+7.2
Workers	Walter Lockhart	1,086	4.3	+4.3
Total formal votes		25,467	97.5	
Informal votes		647	2.5	
Turnout		26,114	91.7	
Two-party-preferred result
Liberal	Neville Hudson	12,745	50.05	+0.2
Labor	Anthony Robinson	12,722	49.95	−0.2
Liberal gain from Labor		Swing	+0.2	
