= Results of the 1979 Victorian state election (Legislative Assembly) =

Australian state election results

Victorian state election, 5 May 1979 Legislative Assembly << 1976–1982 >>
| Enrolled voters | 2,350,407 | | | | |
| Votes cast | 2,193,037 | | Turnout | 93.30 | 0.62 |
| Informal votes | 66,016 | | Informal | 3.01 | 0.47 |
Summary of votes by party
| Party | Primary votes | % | Swing | Seats | Change |
| Labor | 962,123 | 45.23 | +2.80 | 32 | +11 |
| Liberal | 881,366 | 41.44 | -4.44 | 41 | -11 |
| National | 119,385 | 5.61 | -1.46 | 8 | +1 |
| Democrats | 114,053 | 5.36 | * | 0 | ±0 |
| Independent | 30,102 | 1.42 | -0.31 | 0 | -1 |
| Democratic Labor | 10,907 | 0.51 | -2.06 | 0 | ±0 |
| Other | 9,085 | 0.43 | +0.11 | 0 | ±0 |
| Total | 2,127,021 | | | 81 | |
Two-party-preferred
| Liberal | 1,073,415 | 50.5 | –5.3 | | |
| Labor | 1,053,606 | 49.5 | +5.3 | | |

This is a list of electoral district results for the 1979 Victoria, Australia, election.

== Results by electoral district ==
=== Albert Park ===
1979 Victorian state election: Albert Park
| Party | Candidate | Votes | % | ±% |
|---|---|---|---|---|
| Labor | Bunna Walsh | 14,212 | 59.7 | −3.4 |
| Liberal | Donald Gillies | 7,302 | 30.7 | −6.2 |
| Democrats | Marilyn Blair | 2,278 | 9.6 | +9.6 |
| Total formal votes | | 23,792 | 96.4 | +0.3 |
| Informal votes | | 879 | 3.6 | −0.3 |
| Turnout | | 24,671 | 88.4 | +2.7 |
Two-party-preferred result
| Labor | Bunna Walsh | 15,237 | 64.0 | +0.9 |
| Liberal | Donald Gillies | 8,555 | 36.0 | −0.9 |
| Labor hold | | Swing | +0.9 | |

=== Ascot Vale ===
1979 Victorian state election: Ascot Vale
| Party | Candidate | Votes | % | ±% |
|---|---|---|---|---|
| Labor | Tom Edmunds | 16,901 | 68.3 | +5.0 |
| Liberal | Murray Kellam | 7,859 | 31.7 | −5.0 |
| Total formal votes | | 24,760 | 95.2 | −0.9 |
| Informal votes | | 1,241 | 4.8 | +0.9 |
| Turnout | | 26,001 | 92.5 | +0.1 |
| Labor hold | | Swing | +5.0 | |

=== Ballarat North ===
1979 Victorian state election: Ballarat North
| Party | Candidate | Votes | % | ±% |
|---|---|---|---|---|
| Liberal | Tom Evans | 14,324 | 56.3 | −0.5 |
| Labor | Bill Horrocks | 11,108 | 43.7 | +6.1 |
| Total formal votes | | 25,432 | 97.6 | −0.7 |
| Informal votes | | 616 | 2.4 | +0.7 |
| Turnout | | 26,048 | 94.9 | −0.5 |
| Liberal hold | | Swing | −5.6 | |

=== Ballarat South ===
1979 Victorian state election: Ballarat South
| Party | Candidate | Votes | % | ±% |
|---|---|---|---|---|
| Liberal | Joan Chambers | 11,671 | 45.6 | −8.5 |
| Labor | Frank Sheehan | 11,474 | 44.9 | −1.0 |
| Democrats | June Johnson | 1,597 | 6.2 | +6.2 |
| Independent | Glendon Ludbrook | 841 | 3.3 | +3.3 |
| Total formal votes | | 25,583 | 97.9 | +0.5 |
| Informal votes | | 542 | 2.1 | −0.5 |
| Turnout | | 26,125 | 94.8 | +0.1 |
Two-party-preferred result
| Liberal | Joan Chambers | 12,889 | 50.4 | −3.8 |
| Labor | Frank Sheehan | 12,694 | 49.6 | +3.8 |
| Liberal hold | | Swing | −3.8 | |

=== Balwyn ===
1979 Victorian state election: Balwyn
| Party | Candidate | Votes | % | ±% |
|---|---|---|---|---|
| Liberal | Jim Ramsay | 15,206 | 58.6 | −4.9 |
| Labor | Ann Jackson | 7,924 | 30.6 | +2.6 |
| Democrats | Ralph Corrie | 2,800 | 10.8 | +10.8 |
| Total formal votes | | 25,930 | 98.1 | −0.3 |
| Informal votes | | 505 | 1.9 | +0.3 |
| Turnout | | 26,435 | 92.7 | +0.5 |
Two-party-preferred result
| Liberal | Jim Ramsay | 17,112 | 66.0 | −3.3 |
| Labor | Ann Jackson | 8,818 | 34.0 | +3.3 |
| Liberal hold | | Swing | −3.3 | |

=== Benalla ===
1979 Victorian state election: Benalla
| Party | Candidate | Votes | % | ±% |
|---|---|---|---|---|
| National | Tom Trewin | 9,991 | 42.3 | −1.8 |
| Labor | Brian Cousins | 7,768 | 32.9 | +6.0 |
| Liberal | Alan Jones | 5,883 | 24.9 | +2.4 |
| Total formal votes | | 23,642 | 97.8 | −0.6 |
| Informal votes | | 522 | 2.2 | +0.6 |
| Turnout | | 24,164 | 93.4 | −0.4 |
Two-party-preferred result
| National | Tom Trewin | 15,460 | 65.4 | −4.7 |
| Labor | Brian Cousins | 8,182 | 34.6 | +4.7 |
| National hold | | Swing | −4.7 | |

=== Benambra ===
1979 Victorian state election: Benambra
| Party | Candidate | Votes | % | ±% |
|---|---|---|---|---|
| Liberal | Lou Lieberman | 13,382 | 52.5 | +26.5 |
| Labor | Max Edgar | 6,164 | 24.2 | +0.2 |
| National | John Bidgood | 4,966 | 19.5 | −17.1 |
| Independent | Dudley Schubert | 959 | 3.8 | +3.8 |
| Total formal votes | | 25,501 | 97.3 | −0.5 |
| Informal votes | | 693 | 2.7 | +0.5 |
| Turnout | | 26,164 | 92.9 | +0.3 |
Two-party-preferred result
| Liberal | Lou Lieberman | 17,626 | 69.1 | −0.7 |
| Labor | Max Edgar | 7,875 | 30.9 | +0.7 |
| Liberal hold | | Swing | −0.7 | |

=== Bendigo ===
1979 Victorian state election: Bendigo
| Party | Candidate | Votes | % | ±% |
|---|---|---|---|---|
| Liberal | Daryl McClure | 10,829 | 42.6 | −11.0 |
| Labor | Elaine Knight | 10,742 | 42.2 | −4.2 |
| Democrats | Christopher Stoltz | 3,861 | 15.2 | +15.2 |
| Total formal votes | | 25,432 | 98.2 | −0.5 |
| Informal votes | | 467 | 1.8 | +0.5 |
| Turnout | | 25,899 | 95.2 | −0.6 |
Two-party-preferred result
| Liberal | Daryl McClure | 13,016 | 51.2 | −2.4 |
| Labor | Elaine Knight | 12,416 | 48.8 | +2.4 |
| Liberal hold | | Swing | −2.4 | |

=== Bennettswood ===
1979 Victorian state election: Bennettswood
| Party | Candidate | Votes | % | ±% |
|---|---|---|---|---|
| Liberal | Keith McCance | 13,220 | 50.1 | −5.2 |
| Labor | Doug Newton | 10,426 | 39.5 | +0.2 |
| Democrats | Alan Swindon | 2,749 | 10.4 | +10.4 |
| Total formal votes | | 26,395 | 98.1 | −0.1 |
| Informal votes | | 520 | 1.9 | +0.1 |
| Turnout | | 26,915 | 94.6 | +0.4 |
Two-party-preferred result
| Liberal | Keith McCance | 14,806 | 56.1 | −4.0 |
| Labor | Doug Newton | 11,589 | 43.9 | +4.0 |
| Liberal hold | | Swing | −4.0 | |

=== Bentleigh ===
1979 Victorian state election: Bentleigh
| Party | Candidate | Votes | % | ±% |
|---|---|---|---|---|
| Labor | Gordon Hockley | 12,949 | 50.2 | +11.3 |
| Liberal | Bob Suggett | 12,853 | 49.8 | −3.0 |
| Total formal votes | | 25,802 | 97.2 | −0.8 |
| Informal votes | | 736 | 2.8 | +0.8 |
| Turnout | | 26,538 | 95.1 | +0.9 |
| Labor gain from Liberal | | Swing | +9.5 | |

=== Berwick ===
1979 Victorian state election: Berwick
| Party | Candidate | Votes | % | ±% |
|---|---|---|---|---|
| Liberal | Rob Maclellan | 15,942 | 53.0 | +2.9 |
| Labor | Judith Wallace | 11,383 | 37.8 | +4.5 |
| Democrats | Grace Bayliss | 2,754 | 9.2 | +9.2 |
| Total formal votes | | 30,079 | 97.6 | −0.7 |
| Informal votes | | 738 | 2.4 | +0.7 |
| Turnout | | 30,817 | 93.1 | +1.0 |
Two-party-preferred result
| Liberal | Rob Maclellan | 17,509 | 58.2 | −6.9 |
| Labor | Judith Wallace | 12,570 | 41.8 | +6.9 |
| Liberal hold | | Swing | −6.9 | |

=== Box Hill ===
1979 Victorian state election: Box Hill
| Party | Candidate | Votes | % | ±% |
|---|---|---|---|---|
| Liberal | Donald Mackinnon | 12,426 | 47.4 | −6.4 |
| Labor | Adrian Moore | 10,504 | 40.1 | +1.2 |
| Democrats | Esther Poelman | 3,255 | 12.4 | +12.4 |
| Total formal votes | | 26,185 | 97.8 | −0.1 |
| Informal votes | | 583 | 2.2 | +0.1 |
| Turnout | | 26,768 | 92.8 | +0.2 |
Two-party-preferred result
| Liberal | Donald Mackinnon | 14,035 | 53.6 | −6.0 |
| Labor | Adrian Moore | 12,150 | 46.4 | +6.0 |
| Liberal hold | | Swing | −6.0 | |

=== Brighton ===
1979 Victorian state election: Brighton
| Party | Candidate | Votes | % | ±% |
|---|---|---|---|---|
| Liberal | Jeannette Patrick | 15,260 | 62.7 | +0.9 |
| Labor | Christopher Kennedy | 9,062 | 37.3 | +8.6 |
| Total formal votes | | 24,322 | 97.6 | −0.5 |
| Informal votes | | 598 | 2.4 | +0.5 |
| Turnout | | 24,920 | 91.4 | −0.9 |
| Liberal hold | | Swing | −5.4 | |

=== Broadmeadows ===
1979 Victorian state election: Broadmeadows
| Party | Candidate | Votes | % | ±% |
|---|---|---|---|---|
| Labor | John Wilton | 21,000 | 68.4 | +5.2 |
| Liberal | Norman Walker | 5,255 | 17.1 | −19.7 |
| Democrats | Barbara Duncan | 4,462 | 14.5 | +14.5 |
| Total formal votes | | 30,717 | 94.0 | −1.3 |
| Informal votes | | 1,947 | 6.0 | +1.3 |
| Turnout | | 32,664 | 93.4 | +0.6 |
Two-party-preferred result
| Labor | John Wilton | 23,210 | 75.6 | +12.4 |
| Liberal | Norman Walker | 7,507 | 24.4 | −12.4 |
| Labor hold | | Swing | +12.4 | |

=== Brunswick ===
1979 Victorian state election: Brunswick
| Party | Candidate | Votes | % | ±% |
|---|---|---|---|---|
| Labor | Tom Roper | 17,268 | 70.2 | +7.7 |
| Liberal | Geoff Leigh | 5,762 | 23.4 | −4.6 |
| Communist | Philip Herington | 1,580 | 6.4 | +6.4 |
| Total formal votes | | 24,610 | 95.6 | +1.3 |
| Informal votes | | 1,128 | 4.4 | −1.3 |
| Turnout | | 25,738 | 89.8 | −0.7 |
Two-party-preferred result
| Labor | Tom Roper | 18,570 | 75.5 | +10.8 |
| Liberal | Geoff Leigh | 6,040 | 24.5 | −10.8 |
| Labor hold | | Swing | +10.8 | |

=== Bundoora ===
1979 Victorian state election: Bundoora
| Party | Candidate | Votes | % | ±% |
|---|---|---|---|---|
| Labor | John Cain | 16,957 | 59.6 | +6.3 |
| Liberal | Anthony Cree | 10,509 | 36.9 | −9.8 |
| Independent | Jamie Bogle | 1,005 | 3.5 | +3.5 |
| Total formal votes | | 28,471 | 97.1 | −0.6 |
| Informal votes | | 837 | 2.9 | +0.6 |
| Turnout | | 29,308 | 94.4 | +0.5 |
Two-party-preferred result
| Labor | John Cain | 17,251 | 60.6 | +7.3 |
| Liberal | Anthony Cree | 11,220 | 39.4 | −7.3 |
| Labor hold | | Swing | +7.3 | |

=== Burwood ===
1979 Victorian state election: Burwood
| Party | Candidate | Votes | % | ±% |
|---|---|---|---|---|
| Liberal | Jeff Kennett | 13,599 | 54.2 | −3.6 |
| Labor | Douglas Bennett | 8,938 | 35.6 | +1.6 |
| Democrats | Veronica Lysaght | 2,548 | 10.2 | +10.2 |
| Total formal votes | | 25,085 | 98.3 | −0.1 |
| Informal votes | | 428 | 1.7 | +0.1 |
| Turnout | | 25,513 | 92.9 | 0.0 |
Two-party-preferred result
| Liberal | Jeff Kennett | 14,815 | 59.1 | −5.5 |
| Labor | Douglas Bennett | 10,270 | 40.9 | +5.5 |
| Liberal hold | | Swing | −5.5 | |

=== Carrum ===
1979 Victorian state election: Carrum
| Party | Candidate | Votes | % | ±% |
|---|---|---|---|---|
| Labor | Ian Cathie | 15,198 | 55.5 | +0.5 |
| Liberal | Hugh Falconer | 9,613 | 35.1 | −9.9 |
| Democrats | Wendy Kleeman | 2,321 | 8.5 | +8.5 |
| Australia | Brenda Heath | 250 | 0.9 | +0.9 |
| Total formal votes | | 27,382 | 97.3 | +0.1 |
| Informal votes | | 750 | 2.7 | −0.1 |
| Turnout | | 28,132 | 93.2 | +1.2 |
Two-party-preferred result
| Labor | Ian Cathie | 16,936 | 61.9 | +6.9 |
| Liberal | Hugh Falconer | 10,446 | 38.1 | −6.9 |
| Labor hold | | Swing | +6.9 | |

=== Caulfield ===
1979 Victorian state election: Caulfield
| Party | Candidate | Votes | % | ±% |
|---|---|---|---|---|
| Liberal | Ted Tanner | 9,752 | 40.2 | −20.6 |
| Labor | Gilbert Wright | 7,419 | 30.6 | −3.6 |
| Independent | Charles Francis | 4,510 | 18.6 | +18.6 |
| Democrats | Allan Blankfield | 2,573 | 10.6 | +10.6 |
| Total formal votes | | 24,254 | 96.7 | −0.2 |
| Informal votes | | 834 | 3.3 | +0.2 |
| Turnout | | 25,088 | 89.8 | +0.7 |
Two-party-preferred result
| Liberal | Ted Tanner | 13,043 | 53.8 | −11.5 |
| Labor | Gilbert Wright | 11,211 | 46.2 | +11.5 |
| Liberal hold | | Swing | −11.5 | |

=== Coburg ===
1979 Victorian state election: Coburg
| Party | Candidate | Votes | % | ±% |
|---|---|---|---|---|
| Labor | Peter Gavin | 11,647 | 45.7 | +2.4 |
| Independent | Jack Mutton | 7,183 | 28.2 | −0.3 |
| Liberal | Nicholas Kosenko | 4,602 | 18.0 | −5.1 |
| Democrats | Kenneth Goss | 840 | 3.3 | +3.3 |
| Democratic Labor | John Flint | 801 | 3.1 | −2.0 |
| Independent | Raymond Berbling | 439 | 1.7 | +1.7 |
| Total formal votes | | 25,512 | 93.6 | −3.0 |
| Informal votes | | 1,751 | 6.4 | +3.0 |
| Turnout | | 27,263 | 94.8 | +1.2 |
Two-party-preferred result
| Labor | Peter Gavin | 17,731 | 69.5 | +3.0 |
| Liberal | Nicholas Kosenko | 7,781 | 30.5 | −3.0 |
Two-candidate-preferred result
| Labor | Peter Gavin | 13,072 | 51.2 | +6.6 |
| Independent | Jack Mutton | 12,440 | 48.8 | −6.6 |
| Labor gain from Independent | | Swing | +6.6 | |

=== Dandenong ===
1979 Victorian state election: Dandenong
| Party | Candidate | Votes | % | ±% |
|---|---|---|---|---|
| Labor | Rob Jolly | 16,692 | 51.1 | −4.1 |
| Liberal | Francis Holohan | 12,469 | 38.2 | −6.6 |
| Democrats | Janice Bateman | 3,244 | 9.9 | +9.9 |
| Socialist Workers | Ruth Egg | 250 | 0.8 | +0.8 |
| Total formal votes | | 32,655 | 96.3 | −0.5 |
| Informal votes | | 1,236 | 3.7 | +0.5 |
| Turnout | | 33,891 | 94.2 | +1.3 |
Two-party-preferred result
| Labor | Rob Jolly | 18,444 | 56.5 | +1.3 |
| Liberal | Francis Holohan | 14,211 | 43.5 | −1.3 |
| Labor hold | | Swing | +1.3 | |

=== Doncaster ===
1979 Victorian state election: Doncaster
| Party | Candidate | Votes | % | ±% |
|---|---|---|---|---|
| Liberal | Morris Williams | 15,268 | 54.1 | +0.9 |
| Labor | Jean Downing | 9,629 | 34.1 | +7.2 |
| Democrats | Sydney Poulter | 3.166 | 11.2 | +11.2 |
| Australia | Max Mand | 147 | 0.5 | +0.5 |
| Total formal votes | | 28,210 | 97.8 | −0.7 |
| Informal votes | | 632 | 2.2 | +0.7 |
| Turnout | | 28,842 | 94.7 | +0.7 |
Two-party-preferred result
| Liberal | Morris Williams | 17,191 | 60.9 | −5.0 |
| Labor | Jean Downing | 11,019 | 39.1 | +5.0 |
| Liberal hold | | Swing | −5.0 | |

=== Dromana ===
1979 Victorian state election: Dromana
| Party | Candidate | Votes | % | ±% |
|---|---|---|---|---|
| Liberal | Roberts Dunstan | 13,911 | 48.5 | −11.1 |
| Labor | David Hassett | 10,878 | 38.0 | +1.3 |
| Democrats | Laurence Amor | 2,043 | 7.1 | +7.1 |
| National | Kenneth Spunner | 1,835 | 6.4 | +6.4 |
| Total formal votes | | 28,667 | 97.6 | −0.8 |
| Informal votes | | 708 | 2.4 | +0.8 |
| Turnout | | 29,375 | 92.3 | +1.6 |
Two-party-preferred result
| Liberal | Roberts Dunstan | 16,254 | 56.7 | −6.2 |
| Labor | David Hassett | 12,413 | 43.3 | +6.2 |
| Liberal hold | | Swing | −6.2 | |

=== Essendon ===
1979 Victorian state election: Essendon
| Party | Candidate | Votes | % | ±% |
|---|---|---|---|---|
| Labor | Barry Rowe | 12,864 | 50.8 | +0.8 |
| Liberal | Ian Hocking | 10,487 | 41.4 | −8.6 |
| Democratic Labor | Paul McManus | 1,993 | 7.9 | +7.9 |
| Total formal votes | | 25,344 | 97.3 | +0.1 |
| Informal votes | | 702 | 2.7 | −0.1 |
| Turnout | | 26,046 | 94.4 | +0.5 |
Two-party-preferred result
| Labor | Barry Rowe | 13,045 | 51.5 | +1.6 |
| Liberal | Ian Hocking | 12,299 | 48.5 | −1.6 |
| Labor gain from Liberal | | Swing | +1.6 | |

=== Evelyn ===
1979 Victorian state election: Evelyn
| Party | Candidate | Votes | % | ±% |
|---|---|---|---|---|
| Liberal | Jim Plowman | 14,076 | 47.4 | −4.6 |
| Labor | William Thomas | 12,591 | 42.4 | +2.9 |
| Democrats | John Couzens | 3,044 | 10.3 | +10.3 |
| Total formal votes | | 29,711 | 97.4 | −0.6 |
| Informal votes | | 794 | 2.6 | +0.6 |
| Turnout | | 30,505 | 92.8 | +1.2 |
Two-party-preferred result
| Liberal | Jim Plowman | 15,995 | 53.8 | −5.8 |
| Labor | William Thomas | 13,716 | 46.2 | +5.8 |
| Liberal hold | | Swing | −5.8 | |

=== Footscray ===
1979 Victorian state election: Footscray
| Party | Candidate | Votes | % | ±% |
|---|---|---|---|---|
| Labor | Robert Fordham | 17,010 | 69.5 | −2.1 |
| Liberal | John Huntington | 6,153 | 25.1 | −3.3 |
| Socialist Workers | Peter Abrahamson | 1,308 | 5.4 | +5.4 |
| Total formal votes | | 24,471 | 94.3 | −1.2 |
| Informal votes | | 1,474 | 5.7 | +1.2 |
| Turnout | | 25,945 | 92.5 | 0.0 |
Two-party-preferred result
| Labor | Robert Fordham | 18,187 | 74.3 | +2.8 |
| Liberal | John Huntington | 6,284 | 25.7 | −2.8 |
| Labor hold | | Swing | +2.8 | |

=== Forest Hill ===
1979 Victorian state election: Forest Hill
| Party | Candidate | Votes | % | ±% |
|---|---|---|---|---|
| Liberal | John Richardson | 14,745 | 50.3 | −8.0 |
| Labor | Anne Blackburn | 11,576 | 39.5 | +3.1 |
| Democrats | John Goodall | 2,841 | 9.7 | +9.7 |
| Independent | Wilhelm Kapphan | 177 | 0.6 | +0.6 |
| Total formal votes | | 29,339 | 98.0 | −0.3 |
| Informal votes | | 594 | 2.0 | +0.3 |
| Turnout | | 29,933 | 94.4 | +0.6 |
Two-party-preferred result
| Liberal | John Richardson | 16,131 | 55.0 | −8.1 |
| Labor | Anne Blackburn | 13,208 | 45.0 | +8.1 |
| Liberal hold | | Swing | −8.1 | |

=== Frankston ===
1979 Victorian state election: Frankston
| Party | Candidate | Votes | % | ±% |
|---|---|---|---|---|
| Liberal | Graeme Weideman | 15,706 | 52.1 | −7.2 |
| Labor | Archibald Stewart | 11,774 | 39.1 | +2.6 |
| Democrats | William Towers | 2,649 | 8.8 | +8.8 |
| Total formal votes | | 30,129 | 97.9 | −0.5 |
| Informal votes | | 646 | 2.1 | +0.5 |
| Turnout | | 30,775 | 93.5 | +1.2 |
Two-party-preferred result
| Liberal | Graeme Weideman | 17,235 | 57.2 | −5.5 |
| Labor | Archibald Stewart | 12,894 | 42.8 | +5.5 |
| Liberal hold | | Swing | −5.5 | |

=== Geelong East ===
1979 Victorian state election: Geelong East
| Party | Candidate | Votes | % | ±% |
|---|---|---|---|---|
| Labor | Graham Ernst | 11,713 | 47.7 | −0.8 |
| Liberal | Phil Gude | 10,953 | 44.6 | −6.9 |
| Democrats | Reginald Swetten | 1,153 | 4.7 | +4.7 |
| Democratic Labor | Roderick Jordan | 752 | 3.1 | +3.1 |
| Total formal votes | | 24,571 | 97.9 | +0.9 |
| Informal votes | | 534 | 2.1 | −0.9 |
| Turnout | | 25,105 | 94.5 | +0.7 |
Two-party-preferred result
| Labor | Graham Ernst | 12,702 | 51.7 | +3.2 |
| Liberal | Phil Gude | 11,869 | 48.3 | −3.2 |
| Labor gain from Liberal | | Swing | +3.2 | |

=== Geelong North ===
1979 Victorian state election: Geelong North
| Party | Candidate | Votes | % | ±% |
|---|---|---|---|---|
| Labor | Neil Trezise | 16,645 | 65.2 | +2.6 |
| Liberal | John Dow | 8,870 | 34.8 | −2.6 |
| Total formal votes | | 25,515 | 95.9 | −0.9 |
| Informal votes | | 1,097 | 4.1 | +0.9 |
| Turnout | | 26,612 | 93.9 | +0.7 |
| Labor hold | | Swing | +2.6 | |

=== Geelong West ===
1979 Victorian state election: Geelong West
| Party | Candidate | Votes | % | ±% |
|---|---|---|---|---|
| Liberal | Hayden Birrell | 11,640 | 48.9 | −6.3 |
| Labor | Hayden Shell | 10,725 | 45.1 | +0.3 |
| Democrats | Guenter Sahr | 1,436 | 6.0 | +6.0 |
| Total formal votes | | 23,801 | 97.7 | 0.0 |
| Informal votes | | 561 | 2.3 | 0.0 |
| Turnout | | 24,362 | 93.8 | −1.3 |
Two-party-preferred result
| Liberal | Hayden Birrell | 12,092 | 50.8 | −4.4 |
| Labor | Hayden Shell | 11,709 | 49.2 | +4.4 |
| Liberal hold | | Swing | −4.4 | |

=== Gippsland East ===
1979 Victorian state election: Gippsland East
| Party | Candidate | Votes | % | ±% |
|---|---|---|---|---|
| National | Bruce Evans | 9,807 | 41.3 | −4.6 |
| Labor | Graeme McIntyre | 7,421 | 31.2 | +31.2 |
| Liberal | Philip Davis | 6,549 | 27.5 | +6.0 |
| Total formal votes | | 23,777 | 96.6 | −1.2 |
| Informal votes | | 844 | 3.4 | +1.2 |
| Turnout | | 24,621 | 92.7 | +0.3 |
Two-party-preferred result
| National | Bruce Evans | 16,005 | 67.3 | −3.4 |
| Labor | Graeme McIntyre | 7,919 | 32.9 | +32.9 |
| National hold | | Swing | −3.4 | |

=== Gippsland South ===
1979 Victorian state election: Gippsland South
| Party | Candidate | Votes | % | ±% |
|---|---|---|---|---|
| Liberal | David Kallady | 8,998 | 37.4 | +8.3 |
| National | Neil McInnes | 7,293 | 30.3 | −15.2 |
| Labor | Ronald Neal | 5,660 | 23.5 | +2.7 |
| Democrats | Wilma Western | 2,110 | 8.8 | +8.8 |
| Total formal votes | | 24,061 | 97.3 | −0.8 |
| Informal votes | | 657 | 2.7 | +0.8 |
| Turnout | | 24,718 | 92.9 | −0.7 |
Two-party-preferred result
| National | Neil McInnes | 16,142 | 67.1 | −9.0 |
| Labor | Ronald Neal | 7,919 | 32.9 | +9.0 |
Two-candidate-preferred result
| National | Neil McInnes | 13,688 | 56.9 | +5.6 |
| Liberal | David Kallady | 10,373 | 43.1 | −5.6 |
| National hold | | Swing | +5.6 | |

=== Gisborne ===
1979 Victorian state election: Gisborne
| Party | Candidate | Votes | % | ±% |
|---|---|---|---|---|
| Liberal | Tom Reynolds | 15,284 | 52.0 | −0.5 |
| Labor | Ian Elliott | 14,098 | 48.0 | +13.4 |
| Total formal votes | | 29,382 | 97.4 | −0.9 |
| Informal votes | | 774 | 2.6 | +0.9 |
| Turnout | | 30,156 | 94.2 | +0.1 |
| Liberal hold | | Swing | −12.2 | |

=== Glenhuntly ===
1979 Victorian state election: Glenhuntly
| Party | Candidate | Votes | % | ±% |
|---|---|---|---|---|
| Labor | Gerard Vaughan | 11,078 | 46.1 | +4.8 |
| Liberal | Charles Hider | 10,751 | 44.7 | −7.2 |
| Australia | Gail Farrell | 1,190 | 5.0 | +5.0 |
| Democratic Labor | John Mulholland | 1,023 | 4.3 | −2.9 |
| Total formal votes | | 24,042 | 97.0 | −0.5 |
| Informal votes | | 734 | 3.0 | +0.5 |
| Turnout | | 24,776 | 93.1 | +1.3 |
Two-party-preferred result
| Labor | Gerard Vaughan | 12,396 | 51.6 | +9.7 |
| Liberal | Charles Hider | 11,646 | 48.4 | −9.7 |
| Labor gain from Liberal | | Swing | +9.7 | |

=== Glenroy ===
1979 Victorian state election: Glenroy
| Party | Candidate | Votes | % | ±% |
|---|---|---|---|---|
| Labor | Jack Culpin | 16,695 | 66.7 | +7.8 |
| Liberal | Donald McClelland | 8,338 | 33.3 | −7.8 |
| Total formal votes | | 25,033 | 96.1 | −0.2 |
| Informal votes | | 1,027 | 3.9 | +0.2 |
| Turnout | | 26,060 | 94.4 | +0.5 |
| Labor hold | | Swing | +7.8 | |

=== Greensborough ===
1979 Victorian state election: Greensborough
| Party | Candidate | Votes | % | ±% |
|---|---|---|---|---|
| Labor | Pauline Toner | 15,266 | 48.1 | +0.8 |
| Liberal | Ronald Turner | 12,929 | 40.7 | −12.0 |
| Democrats | Leo Bates | 3,369 | 10.6 | +10.6 |
| Australia | Dorothy Prout | 161 | 0.5 | +0.5 |
| Total formal votes | | 31,725 | 98.4 | +0.3 |
| Informal votes | | 529 | 1.6 | −0.3 |
| Turnout | | 32,254 | 92.9 | −0.2 |
Two-party-preferred result
| Labor | Pauline Toner | 17,091 | 53.9 | +6.7 |
| Liberal | Ronald Turner | 14,634 | 46.1 | −6.7 |
| Labor gain from Liberal | | Swing | +6.7 | |

=== Hawthorn ===
1979 Victorian state election: Hawthorn
| Party | Candidate | Votes | % | ±% |
|---|---|---|---|---|
| Liberal | Walter Jona | 12,903 | 54.7 | +0.4 |
| Labor | Kevin Zervos | 8,620 | 36.6 | −1.4 |
| Democrats | Alberta Steegstra | 2,050 | 8.7 | +8.7 |
| Total formal votes | | 23,573 | 97.6 | −0.4 |
| Informal votes | | 581 | 2.4 | +0.4 |
| Turnout | | 24,154 | 89.3 | −1.3 |
Two-party-preferred result
| Liberal | Walter Jona | 14,102 | 59.8 | −0.9 |
| Labor | Kevin Zervos | 9,471 | 40.2 | +0.9 |
| Liberal hold | | Swing | −0.9 | |

=== Heatherton ===
1979 Victorian state election: Heatherton
| Party | Candidate | Votes | % | ±% |
|---|---|---|---|---|
| Labor | Peter Spyker | 12,897 | 46.1 | +1.5 |
| Liberal | Llew Reese | 11,866 | 42.4 | −13.0 |
| Democrats | Sonia Sargood | 3,201 | 11.5 | +11.5 |
| Total formal votes | | 27,964 | 96.5 | −0.4 |
| Informal votes | | 1,000 | 3.5 | +0.4 |
| Turnout | | 28,964 | 93.7 | +0.3 |
Two-party-preferred result
| Labor | Peter Spyker | 14,276 | 51.0 | +6.4 |
| Liberal | Llew Reese | 13,688 | 49.0 | −6.4 |
| Labor gain from Liberal | | Swing | +6.4 | |

=== Ivanhoe ===
1979 Victorian state election: Ivanhoe
| Party | Candidate | Votes | % | ±% |
|---|---|---|---|---|
| Liberal | Bruce Skeggs | 13,483 | 48.3 | −5.7 |
| Labor | Tony Sheehan | 11,279 | 40.4 | +2.3 |
| Democrats | Mario Piraino | 3,146 | 11.3 | +11.3 |
| Total formal votes | | 27,908 | 97.6 | −0.5 |
| Informal votes | | 689 | 2.4 | +0.5 |
| Turnout | | 28,597 | 93.9 | +1.3 |
Two-party-preferred result
| Liberal | Bruce Skeggs | 14,902 | 53.4 | −7.7 |
| Labor | Tony Sheehan | 13,006 | 46.6 | +7.7 |
| Liberal hold | | Swing | −7.7 | |

=== Keilor ===
1979 Victorian state election: Keilor
| Party | Candidate | Votes | % | ±% |
|---|---|---|---|---|
| Labor | Jack Ginifer | 20,648 | 65.2 | +7.0 |
| Liberal | Vaclav Ubl | 11,006 | 34.8 | −4.6 |
| Total formal votes | | 31,654 | 94.0 | −1.3 |
| Informal votes | | 2,036 | 6.0 | +1.3 |
| Turnout | | 33,690 | 94.2 | +1.3 |
| Labor hold | | Swing | +5.0 | |

=== Kew ===
1979 Victorian state election: Kew
| Party | Candidate | Votes | % | ±% |
|---|---|---|---|---|
| Liberal | Rupert Hamer | 14,096 | 54.4 | −3.3 |
| Labor | Wesley Blackmore | 8,102 | 31.3 | +5.1 |
| Democrats | Keith Bruckner | 1,894 | 7.3 | +7.3 |
| Democratic Labor | Stan Keon | 1,827 | 7.1 | +2.9 |
| Total formal votes | | 25,919 | 97.7 | −0.4 |
| Informal votes | | 597 | 2.3 | +0.4 |
| Turnout | | 26,516 | 91.2 | −0.4 |
Two-party-preferred result
| Liberal | Rupert Hamer | 15,875 | 61.2 | −8.8 |
| Labor | Wesley Blackmore | 10,044 | 38.8 | +8.8 |
| Liberal hold | | Swing | −8.8 | |

=== Knox ===
1979 Victorian state election: Knox
| Party | Candidate | Votes | % | ±% |
|---|---|---|---|---|
| Labor | Steve Crabb | 16,187 | 56.1 | +4.3 |
| Liberal | Gerald Ashman | 11,772 | 40.8 | −7.9 |
| Independent | Derek Kruse | 922 | 3.2 | +3.2 |
| Total formal votes | | 28,881 | 97.7 | +0.3 |
| Informal votes | | 669 | 2.3 | −0.3 |
| Turnout | | 29,550 | 95.0 | +2.5 |
Two-party-preferred result
| Labor | Steve Crabb | 16,876 | 58.4 | +7.1 |
| Liberal | Gerald Ashman | 12,005 | 41.6 | −7.1 |
| Labor hold | | Swing | +7.1 | |

=== Lowan ===
1979 Victorian state election: Lowan
| Party | Candidate | Votes | % | ±% |
|---|---|---|---|---|
| Liberal | Jim McCabe | 10,564 | 44.6 | +1.1 |
| National | Bill McGrath | 7,535 | 31.8 | +5.1 |
| Labor | David Drake-Feary | 5,599 | 23.6 | +2.3 |
| Total formal votes | | 23,698 | 98.5 | +0.4 |
| Informal votes | | 353 | 1.5 | −0.4 |
| Turnout | | 24,051 | 95.2 | −0.1 |
Two-party-preferred result
| National | Bill McGrath | 16,941 | 71.5 | −3.0 |
| Labor | David Drake-Feary | 6,757 | 28.5 | +3.0 |
Two-candidate-preferred result
| National | Bill McGrath | 11,976 | 50.5 | +12.2 |
| Liberal | Jim McCabe | 11,722 | 49.5 | −12.2 |
| National gain from Liberal | | Swing | +12.2 | |

=== Malvern ===
1979 Victorian state election: Malvern
| Party | Candidate | Votes | % | ±% |
|---|---|---|---|---|
| Liberal | Lindsay Thompson | 15,167 | 59.7 | −6.0 |
| Labor | Kenneth Penaluna | 8,295 | 32.7 | +4.1 |
| Independent | Martin Cahill | 1,921 | 7.6 | +7.6 |
| Total formal votes | | 25,383 | 97.8 | −0.2 |
| Informal votes | | 560 | 2.2 | +0.2 |
| Turnout | | 25,943 | 90.2 | −0.3 |
Two-party-preferred result
| Liberal | Lindsay Thompson | 16,506 | 65.0 | −5.8 |
| Labor | Kenneth Penaluna | 8,875 | 35.0 | +5.8 |
| Liberal hold | | Swing | −5.8 | |

=== Melbourne ===
1979 Victorian state election: Melbourne
| Party | Candidate | Votes | % | ±% |
|---|---|---|---|---|
| Labor | Keith Remington | 12,129 | 58.8 | −3.6 |
| Liberal | John Campbell | 6,001 | 29.1 | −5.7 |
| Democrats | Trevor Cooke | 1,769 | 8.6 | +8.6 |
| Communist | Roger Wilson | 725 | 3.5 | +3.5 |
| Total formal votes | | 20,624 | 94.3 | −1.6 |
| Informal votes | | 1,247 | 5.7 | +1.6 |
| Turnout | | 21,871 | 86.1 | −0.2 |
Two-party-preferred result
| Labor | Keith Remington | 13,608 | 66.0 | +1.2 |
| Liberal | John Campbell | 7,016 | 34.0 | −1.2 |
| Labor hold | | Swing | +1.2 | |

=== Mentone ===
1979 Victorian state election: Mentone
| Party | Candidate | Votes | % | ±% |
|---|---|---|---|---|
| Liberal | Bill Templeton | 13,491 | 51.4 | −4.5 |
| Labor | Barry Hirt | 11,190 | 42.6 | +4.7 |
| Democratic Labor | Desmond Burke | 1,589 | 6.0 | −0.2 |
| Total formal votes | | 26,270 | 97.8 | −0.4 |
| Informal votes | | 590 | 2.2 | +0.4 |
| Turnout | | 26,860 | 93.0 | +0.6 |
Two-party-preferred result
| Liberal | Bill Templeton | 14,851 | 56.5 | −4.4 |
| Labor | Barry Hirt | 11,419 | 43.5 | +4.4 |
| Liberal hold | | Swing | −4.4 | |

=== Midlands ===
1979 Victorian state election: Midlands
| Party | Candidate | Votes | % | ±% |
|---|---|---|---|---|
| Liberal | Bill Ebery | 12,069 | 49.1 | +8.9 |
| Labor | John Brumby | 10,042 | 40.9 | +3.9 |
| Democrats | Janice Russell | 2,457 | 10.0 | +10.0 |
| Total formal votes | | 24,568 | 98.4 | −0.1 |
| Informal votes | | 397 | 1.6 | +0.1 |
| Turnout | | 24,965 | 94.1 | −0.7 |
Two-party-preferred result
| Liberal | Bill Ebery | 13,524 | 55.0 | −5.7 |
| Labor | John Brumby | 11,044 | 45.0 | +5.7 |
| Liberal hold | | Swing | −5.7 | |

=== Mildura ===
1979 Victorian state election: Mildura
| Party | Candidate | Votes | % | ±% |
|---|---|---|---|---|
| National | Milton Whiting | 13,033 | 56.1 | +4.3 |
| Labor | Harry Sugars | 5,912 | 25.5 | +2.1 |
| Liberal | David Mattiske | 4,269 | 18.4 | −3.1 |
| Total formal votes | | 23,214 | 96.5 | −1.4 |
| Informal votes | | 843 | 3.5 | +1.4 |
| Turnout | | 24,057 | 94.1 | +1.2 |
Two-party-preferred result
| National | Milton Whiting | 16,794 | 72.3 | −1.9 |
| Labor | Harry Sugars | 6,420 | 27.7 | +1.9 |
| National hold | | Swing | −1.9 | |

=== Mitcham ===
1979 Victorian state election: Mitcham
| Party | Candidate | Votes | % | ±% |
|---|---|---|---|---|
| Liberal | George Cox | 11,807 | 44.3 | −11.2 |
| Labor | Michael Shatin | 11,799 | 44.3 | −0.2 |
| Democrats | Frank Andrewartha | 2,227 | 8.4 | +8.4 |
| Australia | Peter Allan | 801 | 3.0 | +3.0 |
| Total formal votes | | 26,634 | 97.8 | +0.4 |
| Informal votes | | 607 | 2.2 | −0.4 |
| Turnout | | 27,241 | 94.5 | +0.9 |
Two-party-preferred result
| Liberal | George Cox | 13,512 | 50.7 | −4.8 |
| Labor | Michael Shatin | 13,122 | 49.3 | +4.8 |
| Liberal hold | | Swing | −4.8 | |

=== Monbulk ===
1979 Victorian state election: Monbulk
| Party | Candidate | Votes | % | ±% |
|---|---|---|---|---|
| Liberal | Bill Borthwick | 12,619 | 46.3 | −10.3 |
| Labor | Francesco Cafarella | 11,400 | 41.8 | −1.6 |
| Democrats | Malcolm Matheson | 2,938 | 10.8 | +10.8 |
| Australia | Ian Wood | 301 | 1.1 | +1.1 |
| Total formal votes | | 27,258 | 97.5 | −0.3 |
| Informal votes | | 693 | 2.5 | +0.3 |
| Turnout | | 27,951 | 92.4 | +0.9 |
Two-party-preferred result
| Liberal | Bill Borthwick | 14,224 | 52.2 | −4.4 |
| Labor | Francesco Cafarella | 13,034 | 47.8 | +4.4 |
| Liberal hold | | Swing | −4.4 | |

=== Morwell ===
1979 Victorian state election: Morwell
| Party | Candidate | Votes | % | ±% |
|---|---|---|---|---|
| Labor | Derek Amos | 14,946 | 60.8 | −1.4 |
| Liberal | Ian Lockwood | 6,239 | 25.4 | +2.1 |
| National | Gary Black | 1,808 | 7.3 | +7.3 |
| Democrats | Ross Ollquist | 1,230 | 5.0 | +5.0 |
| Independent | Robert McCracken | 372 | 1.5 | +1.5 |
| Total formal votes | | 24,595 | 97.2 | −1.1 |
| Informal votes | | 713 | 2.8 | +1.1 |
| Turnout | | 25,308 | 94.2 | +0.4 |
Two-party-preferred result
| Labor | Derek Amos | 16,384 | 66.6 | +3.0 |
| Liberal | Ian Lockwood | 8,211 | 33.4 | −3.0 |
| Labor hold | | Swing | +3.0 | |

=== Murray Valley ===
1979 Victorian state election: Murray Valley
| Party | Candidate | Votes | % | ±% |
|---|---|---|---|---|
| National | Ken Jasper | 11,936 | 49.8 | +3.4 |
| Labor | Abigail Donlon | 6,802 | 28.4 | +2.9 |
| Liberal | Brian Lumsden | 5,242 | 21.9 | +0.7 |
| Total formal votes | | 23,980 | 96.4 | −1.2 |
| Informal votes | | 889 | 3.6 | +1.2 |
Two-party-preferred result
| National | Ken Jasper | 16,895 | 70.5 | −1.6 |
| Labor | Abigail Donlon | 7,085 | 29.5 | +1.6 |
| National hold | | Swing | −1.6 | |

=== Narracan ===
1979 Victorian state election: Narracan
| Party | Candidate | Votes | % | ±% |
|---|---|---|---|---|
| Liberal | Jim Balfour | 11,023 | 43.8 | +8.2 |
| Labor | William Rutherford | 10,675 | 42.4 | +4.8 |
| National | Douglas Hatfield | 2,275 | 9.0 | −13.5 |
| Democrats | Alan Petschack | 1,221 | 4.9 | +4.9 |
| Total formal votes | | 25,194 | 98.0 | −0.6 |
| Informal votes | | 521 | 2.0 | +0.6 |
| Turnout | | 25,715 | 94.4 | +0.3 |
Two-party-preferred result
| Liberal | Jim Balfour | 13,878 | 55.1 | −5.1 |
| Labor | William Rutherford | 11,316 | 44.9 | +5.1 |
| Liberal hold | | Swing | −5.1 | |

=== Niddrie ===
1979 Victorian state election: Niddrie
| Party | Candidate | Votes | % | ±% |
|---|---|---|---|---|
| Labor | Jack Simpson | 14,701 | 54.8 | +5.9 |
| Liberal | Roslyn Crago | 8,974 | 33.4 | −9.6 |
| Independent | Cecil Kirchner | 1,692 | 6.3 | +6.3 |
| Democrats | Bruce McNeill | 1,476 | 5.5 | +5.5 |
| Total formal votes | | 26,843 | 96.2 | −0.5 |
| Informal votes | | 1,057 | 3.8 | +0.5 |
| Turnout | | 27,900 | 95.7 | −0.1 |
Two-party-preferred result
| Labor | Jack Simpson | 16,020 | 59.7 | +7.7 |
| Liberal | Roslyn Crago | 10,823 | 40.3 | −7.7 |
| Labor hold | | Swing | +7.7 | |

=== Noble Park ===
1979 Victorian state election: Noble Park
| Party | Candidate | Votes | % | ±% |
|---|---|---|---|---|
| Liberal | Peter Collins | 14,947 | 51.0 | −5.1 |
| Labor | Tony Van Vliet | 14,352 | 49.0 | +5.1 |
| Total formal votes | | 29,299 | 95.9 | −1.1 |
| Informal votes | | 1,259 | 4.1 | +1.1 |
| Turnout | | 30,558 | 94.4 | +0.9 |
| Liberal hold | | Swing | −5.1 | |

=== Northcote ===
1979 Victorian state election: Northcote
| Party | Candidate | Votes | % | ±% |
|---|---|---|---|---|
| Labor | Frank Wilkes | 17,897 | 70.2 | +6.0 |
| Liberal | Lilian Heath | 6,821 | 26.7 | −9.1 |
| Independent | Ian Hughes | 793 | 3.1 | +3.1 |
| Total formal votes | | 25,511 | 95.9 | −0.4 |
| Informal votes | | 1,103 | 4.1 | +0.4 |
| Turnout | | 26,614 | 90.7 | 0.0 |
Two-party-preferred result
| Labor | Frank Wilkes | 18,336 | 71.9 | +7.7 |
| Liberal | Lilian Heath | 7,175 | 28.1 | −7.7 |
| Labor hold | | Swing | +7.7 | |

=== Oakleigh ===
1979 Victorian state election: Oakleigh
| Party | Candidate | Votes | % | ±% |
|---|---|---|---|---|
| Labor | Race Mathews | 12,072 | 46.3 | +7.1 |
| Liberal | Alan Scanlan | 10,753 | 41.2 | −5.2 |
| Democrats | Domenico Quadara | 1,921 | 7.4 | +7.4 |
| Democratic Labor | Elaine Mulholland | 910 | 3.5 | +3.5 |
| Australia | David Heath | 433 | 1.7 | −2.5 |
| Total formal votes | | 26,089 | 97.0 | −0.6 |
| Informal votes | | 816 | 3.0 | +0.6 |
| Turnout | | 26,905 | 93.3 | −0.1 |
Two-party-preferred result
| Labor | Race Mathews | 13,497 | 51.7 | +3.0 |
| Liberal | Alan Scanlan | 12,592 | 48.3 | −3.0 |
| Labor gain from Liberal | | Swing | +3.0 | |

=== Polwarth ===
1979 Victorian state election: Polwarth
| Party | Candidate | Votes | % | ±% |
|---|---|---|---|---|
| Liberal | Cec Burgin | 12,751 | 53.8 | −1.2 |
| Labor | Ronald Wheaton | 6,084 | 25.7 | +4.4 |
| National | Gilbert Anderson | 3,593 | 15.2 | −3.7 |
| Democrats | Kathleen May | 1,254 | 5.3 | +5.3 |
| Total formal votes | | 23,682 | 98.1 | −0.3 |
| Informal votes | | 467 | 1.9 | +0.3 |
| Turnout | | 24,149 | 96.0 | +0.2 |
Two-party-preferred result
| Liberal | Cec Burgin | 16,264 | 68.7 | −7.9 |
| Labor | Ronald Wheaton | 7,418 | 31.3 | +7.9 |
| Liberal hold | | Swing | −7.9 | |

=== Portland ===
1979 Victorian state election: Portland
| Party | Candidate | Votes | % | ±% |
|---|---|---|---|---|
| Liberal | Don McKellar | 10,294 | 42.5 | +0.9 |
| Labor | Bill Lewis | 8,166 | 33.7 | +1.0 |
| National | Roger Hallam | 5,765 | 23.8 | +2.0 |
| Total formal votes | | 24,225 | 98.6 | −0.2 |
| Informal votes | | 24,569 | 95.4 | −0.1 |
| Turnout | | 24,569 | 95.4 | −0.1 |
Two-party-preferred result
| Liberal | Don McKellar | 14,063 | 58.0 | −6.7 |
| Labor | Bill Lewis | 10,162 | 42.0 | +6.7 |
| Liberal hold | | Swing | −6.7 | |

=== Prahran ===
1979 Victorian state election: Prahran
| Party | Candidate | Votes | % | ±% |
|---|---|---|---|---|
| Labor | Bob Miller | 10,517 | 46.1 | +5.6 |
| Liberal | Tony De Domenico | 9,960 | 43.6 | −7.9 |
| Democrats | Peter Bowden | 2,059 | 9.0 | +9.0 |
| Independent | Trevor McCandless | 291 | 1.3 | +1.3 |
| Total formal votes | | 22,827 | 96.7 | −0.3 |
| Informal votes | | 780 | 3.3 | +0.3 |
| Turnout | | 23,607 | 88.2 | +3.9 |
Two-party-preferred result
| Labor | Bob Miller | 11,630 | 50.9 | +6.6 |
| Liberal | Tony De Domenico | 11,197 | 49.1 | −6.6 |
| Labor gain from Liberal | | Swing | +6.6 | |

=== Preston ===
1979 Victorian state election: Preston
| Party | Candidate | Votes | % | ±% |
|---|---|---|---|---|
| Labor | Carl Kirkwood | 17,295 | 71.5 | +5.7 |
| Liberal | Elie Obeid | 6,890 | 28.5 | −5.7 |
| Total formal votes | | 24,185 | 95.4 | −0.8 |
| Informal votes | | 1,163 | 4.6 | +0.8 |
| Turnout | | 25,348 | 91.8 | −0.1 |
| Labor hold | | Swing | +5.7 | |

=== Reservoir ===
1979 Victorian state election: Reservoir
| Party | Candidate | Votes | % | ±% |
|---|---|---|---|---|
| Labor | Jim Simmonds | 18,129 | 67.4 | +4.6 |
| Liberal | Hugh Luscombe | 7,191 | 26.7 | −6.9 |
| Democrats | Arno Vann | 1,589 | 5.9 | +5.9 |
| Total formal votes | | 26,909 | 95.6 | −0.9 |
| Informal votes | | 1,233 | 4.4 | +0.9 |
| Turnout | | 28,142 | 93.7 | +0.7 |
Two-party-preferred result
| Labor | Jim Simmonds | 19,095 | 71.0 | +6.9 |
| Liberal | Hugh Luscombe | 7,814 | 29.0 | −6.9 |
| Labor hold | | Swing | +6.9 | |

=== Richmond ===
1979 Victorian state election: Richmond
| Party | Candidate | Votes | % | ±% |
|---|---|---|---|---|
| Labor | Theo Sidiropoulos | 15,495 | 64.8 | −6.1 |
| Liberal | Wendy Leigh | 4,987 | 20.9 | −5.4 |
| Democrats | Vivian Keating | 2,995 | 12.5 | +12.5 |
| Independent | Astridis Lalopoulos | 430 | 1.8 | +1.8 |
| Total formal votes | | 23,907 | 94.6 | −1.5 |
| Informal votes | | 1,356 | 5.4 | +1.5 |
| Turnout | | 25,263 | 87.4 | −0.1 |
Two-party-preferred result
| Labor | Theo Sidiropoulos | 16,830 | 70.4 | −2.9 |
| Liberal | Wendy Leigh | 7,077 | 29.6 | +2.9 |
| Labor hold | | Swing | −2.9 | |

=== Ringwood ===
1979 Victorian state election: Ringwood
| Party | Candidate | Votes | % | ±% |
|---|---|---|---|---|
| Liberal | Peter McArthur | 13,364 | 47.8 | −11.2 |
| Labor | Robert Wallace | 11,435 | 40.9 | −0.1 |
| Democrats | Max Capon | 2,841 | 10.2 | +10.2 |
| Australia | Wilfrid Thiele | 332 | 1.2 | +1.2 |
| Total formal votes | | 27,972 | 97.6 | +0.1 |
| Informal votes | | 683 | 2.4 | −0.1 |
| Turnout | | 28,655 | 94.1 | +0.9 |
Two-party-preferred result
| Liberal | Peter McArthur | 15,141 | 54.1 | −4.9 |
| Labor | Robert Wallace | 12,831 | 45.9 | +4.9 |
| Liberal hold | | Swing | −4.9 | |

=== Ripon ===
1979 Victorian state election: Ripon
| Party | Candidate | Votes | % | ±% |
|---|---|---|---|---|
| Liberal | Tom Austin | 11,738 | 46.9 | +8.7 |
| Labor | Alex Pope | 10,664 | 42.6 | +4.2 |
| National | Robert Peck | 2,637 | 10.5 | −10.0 |
| Total formal votes | | 25,039 | 98.2 | −0.3 |
| Informal votes | | 446 | 1.8 | +0.3 |
Two-party-preferred result
| Liberal | Tom Austin | 13,819 | 55.2 | −4.7 |
| Labor | Alex Pope | 11,220 | 44.8 | +4.7 |
| Liberal hold | | Swing | −4.7 | |

=== Rodney ===
1979 Victorian state election: Rodney
| Party | Candidate | Votes | % | ±% |
|---|---|---|---|---|
| National | Eddie Hann | 14,226 | 58.6 | −5.6 |
| Liberal | Victor Kuhle | 4,120 | 17.0 | +0.1 |
| Labor | Stephen Jones | 4,089 | 16.8 | +1.8 |
| Democrats | Janet Powell | 1,851 | 7.6 | +7.6 |
| Total formal votes | | 24,286 | 97.6 | −0.8 |
| Informal votes | | 603 | 2.4 | +0.8 |
| Turnout | | 24,889 | 95.3 | +0.2 |
Two-party-preferred result
| National | Eddie Hann | 19,046 | 78.4 | −4.7 |
| Labor | Stephen Jones | 5,240 | 21.6 | +4.7 |
| National hold | | Swing | −4.7 | |

=== St Kilda ===
1979 Victorian state election: St Kilda
| Party | Candidate | Votes | % | ±% |
|---|---|---|---|---|
| Liberal | Brian Dixon | 10,112 | 44.9 | −7.7 |
| Labor | David Hardy | 9,977 | 44.3 | +5.2 |
| Democrats | Douglas Davidson | 1,327 | 5.9 | +5.9 |
| Democratic Labor | John Cotter | 1,125 | 5.0 | +5.0 |
| Total formal votes | | 22,541 | 95.4 | −1.2 |
| Informal votes | | 1,088 | 4.6 | +1.2 |
| Turnout | | 23,629 | 87.5 | +1.3 |
Two-party-preferred result
| Liberal | Brian Dixon | 11,312 | 50.2 | −5.9 |
| Labor | David Hardy | 11,229 | 49.8 | +5.9 |
| Liberal hold | | Swing | −5.9 | |

=== Sandringham ===
1979 Victorian state election: Sandringham
| Party | Candidate | Votes | % | ±% |
|---|---|---|---|---|
| Liberal | Max Crellin | 11,638 | 45.3 | −8.4 |
| Labor | Neville Garner | 10,892 | 42.4 | +0.2 |
| Democrats | Graeme Evans | 3,142 | 12.2 | +12.2 |
| Total formal votes | | 25,672 | 98.1 | −0.2 |
| Informal votes | | 498 | 1.9 | +0.2 |
| Turnout | | 26,170 | 93.3 | +0.9 |
Two-party-preferred result
| Liberal | Max Crellin | 13,304 | 51.6 | −5.8 |
| Labor | Neville Garner | 12,368 | 48.2 | +5.8 |
| Liberal hold | | Swing | −5.8 | |

=== Shepparton ===
1979 Victorian state election: Shepparton
| Party | Candidate | Votes | % | ±% |
|---|---|---|---|---|
| National | Peter Ross-Edwards | 12,362 | 50.0 | −4.1 |
| Labor | Marjorie Gillies | 6,598 | 26.7 | +7.3 |
| Liberal | Haset Sali | 5,756 | 23.3 | +1.7 |
| Total formal votes | | 24,716 | 96.1 | −1.8 |
| Informal votes | | 993 | 3.9 | +1.8 |
| Turnout | | 25,709 | 95.6 | +0.3 |
Two-party-preferred result
| National | Peter Ross-Edwards | 17,502 | 70.8 | −6.9 |
| Labor | Marjorie Gillies | 7,214 | 29.2 | +6.9 |
| National hold | | Swing | −6.9 | |

=== South Barwon ===
1979 Victorian state election: South Barwon
| Party | Candidate | Votes | % | ±% |
|---|---|---|---|---|
| Liberal | Aurel Smith | 15,310 | 56.6 | −2.0 |
| Labor | Eric Young | 11,728 | 43.4 | +6.8 |
| Total formal votes | | 27,038 | 97.9 | −0.3 |
| Informal votes | | 566 | 2.1 | +0.3 |
| Turnout | | 27,604 | 95.1 | +0.6 |
| Liberal hold | | Swing | −6.4 | |

=== Springvale ===
1979 Victorian state election: Springvale
| Party | Candidate | Votes | % | ±% |
|---|---|---|---|---|
| Labor | Kevin King | 12,781 | 46.4 | +0.8 |
| Liberal | Norman Billing | 11,795 | 42.8 | −11.6 |
| Democrats | James Wright | 2,111 | 7.7 | +7.7 |
| Independent | Edward Woods | 887 | 3.2 | +3.2 |
| Total formal votes | | 27,574 | 96.2 | −0.3 |
| Informal votes | | 1,084 | 3.8 | +0.3 |
| Turnout | | 28,658 | 94.3 | +1.0 |
Two-party-preferred result
| Labor | Kevin King | 13,980 | 50.7 | +5.1 |
| Liberal | Norman Billing | 13,594 | 49.3 | −5.1 |
| Labor gain from Liberal | | Swing | +5.1 | |

=== Sunshine ===
1979 Victorian state election: Sunshine
| Party | Candidate | Votes | % | ±% |
|---|---|---|---|---|
| Labor | Bill Fogarty | 19,188 | 72.1 | +7.9 |
| Liberal | Andreas Zafiropoulos | 6,198 | 23.3 | −1.9 |
| Democrats | Algimantas Kacinskas | 1,232 | 4.6 | +4.6 |
| Total formal votes | | 26,618 | 94.3 | −1.0 |
| Informal votes | | 1,620 | 5.7 | +1.0 |
| Turnout | | 28,238 | 94.8 | +2.9 |
Two-party-preferred result
| Labor | Bill Fogarty | 19,832 | 74.5 | +2.9 |
| Liberal | Andreas Zafiropoulos | 6,786 | 25.5 | −2.9 |
| Labor hold | | Swing | +2.9 | |

=== Swan Hill ===
1979 Victorian state election: Swan Hill
| Party | Candidate | Votes | % | ±% |
|---|---|---|---|---|
| Liberal | Alan Wood | 14,371 | 59.0 | +10.7 |
| National | Keith Warne | 5,698 | 23.4 | −11.9 |
| Labor | Geoffrey Ferns | 4,300 | 17.7 | +3.4 |
| Total formal votes | | 24,369 | 98.4 | −0.2 |
| Informal votes | | 394 | 1.6 | +0.2 |
| Turnout | | 24,763 | 95.5 | +0.8 |
Two-party-preferred result
| Liberal | Alan Wood | 18,223 | 74.8 | −8.4 |
| Labor | Geoffrey Ferns | 6,146 | 25.2 | +8.4 |
| Liberal hold | | Swing | −8.4 | |

- The two candidate preferred vote was not counted between the Liberal and National candidates for Swan Hill.

=== Syndal ===
1979 Victorian state election: Syndal
| Party | Candidate | Votes | % | ±% |
|---|---|---|---|---|
| Liberal | Geoff Coleman | 12,586 | 46.4 | −9.7 |
| Labor | Russell Oakley | 12,183 | 44.9 | +1.0 |
| Democrats | Christopher Prawdzic | 2,354 | 8.7 | +8.7 |
| Total formal votes | | 27,123 | 96.8 | −0.5 |
| Informal votes | | 881 | 3.2 | +0.5 |
| Turnout | | 28,004 | 94.0 | +0.5 |
Two-party-preferred result
| Liberal | Geoff Coleman | 13,752 | 50.7 | −5.4 |
| Labor | Russell Oakley | 13,371 | 49.3 | +5.4 |
| Liberal hold | | Swing | −5.4 | |

=== Wantirna ===
1979 Victorian state election: Wantirna
| Party | Candidate | Votes | % | ±% |
|---|---|---|---|---|
| Liberal | Geoff Hayes | 17,840 | 52.4 | −8.5 |
| Labor | Jeffrey Kaufman | 12,131 | 35.6 | +2.0 |
| Democrats | Colin Styring | 3,602 | 10.6 | +10.6 |
| Australia | John Benigno | 482 | 1.4 | +1.4 |
| Total formal votes | | 34,055 | 97.9 | −0.4 |
| Informal votes | | 714 | 2.1 | +0.4 |
| Turnout | | 34,769 | 94.0 | +1.0 |
Two-party-preferred result
| Liberal | Geoff Hayes | 19,618 | 57.6 | −8.2 |
| Labor | Jeffrey Kaufman | 14,437 | 42.4 | +8.2 |
| Liberal hold | | Swing | −8.2 | |

=== Warrandyte ===
1979 Victorian state election: Warrandyte
| Party | Candidate | Votes | % | ±% |
|---|---|---|---|---|
| Liberal | Norman Lacy | 14,644 | 49.5 | −11.1 |
| Labor | Richard Davies | 11,057 | 37.4 | −2.0 |
| Democrats | Robyn Barker | 3,669 | 12.4 | +12.4 |
| Independent | Dulcie Bethune | 203 | 0.7 | +0.7 |
| Total formal votes | | 29,573 | 98.3 | +0.4 |
| Informal votes | | 522 | 1.7 | −0.4 |
| Turnout | | 30,095 | 93.9 | +0.7 |
Two-party-preferred result
| Liberal | Norman Lacy | 16,586 | 56.1 | −4.5 |
| Labor | Richard Davies | 12,987 | 43.9 | +4.5 |
| Liberal hold | | Swing | −4.5 | |

=== Warrnambool ===
1979 Victorian state election: Warrnambool
| Party | Candidate | Votes | % | ±% |
|---|---|---|---|---|
| Liberal | Ian Smith | 12,258 | 51.1 | +4.3 |
| Labor | Vernon Delaney | 7,975 | 33.2 | +2.0 |
| National | Ian Symons | 3,051 | 12.7 | −2.4 |
| Independent | Gwenneth Trayling | 708 | 3.0 | +3.0 |
| Total formal votes | | 23,992 | 97.8 | −0.9 |
| Informal votes | | 536 | 2.2 | +0.9 |
| Turnout | | 24,528 | 95.3 | +0.1 |
Two-party-preferred result
| Liberal | Ian Smith | 14,983 | 62.4 | −2.8 |
| Labor | Vernon Delaney | 9,009 | 37.6 | +2.8 |
| Liberal hold | | Swing | −2.8 | |

=== Werribee ===
1979 Victorian state election: Werribee
| Party | Candidate | Votes | % | ±% |
|---|---|---|---|---|
| Labor | Ken Coghill | 17,653 | 56.3 | +7.5 |
| Liberal | Stuart Southwick | 11,728 | 37.4 | −9.6 |
| Independent | Charles Skidmore | 1,962 | 6.3 | +6.3 |
| Total formal votes | | 31,343 | 97.3 | −0.2 |
| Informal votes | | 880 | 2.7 | +0.2 |
| Turnout | | 32,223 | 93.3 | +1.6 |
Two-party-preferred result
| Labor | Ken Coghill | 18,214 | 58.1 | +8.2 |
| Liberal | Stuart Southwick | 13,129 | 41.9 | −8.2 |
| Labor gain from Liberal | | Swing | +8.2 | |

=== Westernport ===
1979 Victorian state election: Westernport
| Party | Candidate | Votes | % | ±% |
|---|---|---|---|---|
| Liberal | Alan Brown | 9,589 | 33.5 | −12.7 |
| Labor | Russell Joiner | 9,271 | 32.4 | +0.3 |
| Independent | Doug Jennings | 6,819 | 23.8 | +23.8 |
| National | Lawrence Wintle | 1,574 | 5.5 | −12.7 |
| Democrats | Ronald Bowman | 1,404 | 4.9 | +4.9 |
| Total formal votes | | 28,657 | 97.7 | −0.4 |
| Informal votes | | 684 | 2.3 | +0.4 |
| Turnout | | 29,341 | 93.7 | +0.4 |
Two-party-preferred result
| Liberal | Alan Brown | 17,172 | 59.9 | −6.4 |
| Labor | Russell Joiner | 11,485 | 40.1 | +6.4 |
| Liberal hold | | Swing | −6.4 | |

=== Williamstown ===
1979 Victorian state election: Williamstown
| Party | Candidate | Votes | % | ±% |
|---|---|---|---|---|
| Labor | Gordon Stirling | 17,612 | 66.8 | +3.8 |
| Liberal | Peter Morris | 8,758 | 33.2 | −3.8 |
| Total formal votes | | 26,370 | 94.9 | +0.8 |
| Informal votes | | 1,403 | 5.1 | −0.8 |
| Turnout | | 27,773 | 94.1 | +1.2 |
| Labor hold | | Swing | +3.8 | |

== See also ==
- 1979 Victorian state election
- Members of the Victorian Legislative Assembly, 1979–1982
