= Electoral results for the district of Doncaster =

Victoria, Australia, district election results

This is a list of electoral results for the Electoral district of Doncaster in Victorian state elections.

== Members for Doncaster ==
Member	Party	Term
Morris Williams	Liberal	1976–1988
Victor Perton	Liberal	1988–2006
Mary Wooldridge	Liberal	2006–2014

== Election results ==
=== Elections in the 2010s ===
2010 Victorian state election: Doncaster
Party	Candidate	Votes	%	±%
Liberal	Mary Wooldridge	20,417	62.73	+12.18
Labor	Charles Pick	8,500	26.12	−6.55
Greens	Nick Carson	2,616	8.04	+0.64
Family First	Ken Smithies	1,015	3.12	−1.16
Total formal votes		32,548	95.28	−0.73
Informal votes		1,614	4.72	+0.73
Turnout		34,162	93.54	+0.00
Two-party-preferred result
Liberal	Mary Wooldridge	22,020	67.61	+9.49
Labor	Charles Pick	10,549	32.39	−9.49
Liberal hold		Swing	+9.49	

=== Elections in the 2000s ===
2006 Victorian state election: Doncaster
Party	Candidate	Votes	%	±%
Liberal	Mary Wooldridge	16,127	50.55	+2.57
Labor	Lidia Argondizzo	10,423	32.67	−10.08
Greens	Chris Gymer	2,360	7.40	−1.87
Independent	Irene Goonan	1,628	5.10	+5.10
Family First	Dot Peak	1,367	4.28	+4.28
Total formal votes		31,905	96.01	−0.86
Informal votes		1,325	3.99	+0.86
Turnout		33,230	93.54	+0.48
Two-party-preferred result
Liberal	Mary Wooldridge	18,541	58.12	+7.35
Labor	Lidia Argondizzo	13,359	41.88	−7.35
Liberal hold		Swing	+7.35	

2002 Victorian state election: Doncaster
Party	Candidate	Votes	%	±%
Liberal	Victor Perton	15,324	48.0	−11.8
Labor	Kate Dunn	13,652	42.7	+9.4
Greens	Kerry Dawborn	2,960	9.3	+4.4
Total formal votes		31,936	96.9	−0.3
Informal votes		1,033	3.1	+0.3
Turnout		32,969	93.1	
Two-party-preferred result
Liberal	Victor Perton	16,213	50.8	−11.5
Labor	Kate Dunn	15,723	49.2	+11.5
Liberal hold		Swing	−11.5	

=== Elections in the 1990s ===
1999 Victorian state election: Doncaster
Party	Candidate	Votes	%	±%
Liberal	Victor Perton	19,707	60.8	−3.1
Labor	Jessie McCallum	10,579	32.6	−0.3
Greens	Sam Fyfield	1,497	4.6	+4.6
Hope	Geoff Dawe	629	1.9	+1.9
Total formal votes		32,412	97.3	−0.3
Informal votes		915	2.7	+0.3
Turnout		33,327	92.8	
Two-party-preferred result
Liberal	Victor Perton	20,518	63.3	−1.7
Labor	Jessie McCallum	11,892	36.7	+1.7
Liberal hold		Swing	−1.7	

1996 Victorian state election: Doncaster
Party	Candidate	Votes	%	±%
Liberal	Victor Perton	20,472	63.9	−4.1
Labor	Kevin Jensen	10,547	32.9	+1.0
Natural Law	George Rose	1,003	3.1	+3.1
Total formal votes		32,022	97.6	+1.5
Informal votes		795	2.4	−1.5
Turnout		32,817	94.6	
Two-party-preferred result
Liberal	Victor Perton	20,783	65.0	−3.1
Labor	Kevin Jensen	11,215	35.0	+3.1
Liberal hold		Swing	−3.1	

1992 Victorian state election: Doncaster
Party	Candidate	Votes	%	±%
Liberal	Victor Perton	20,997	68.1	+10.6
Labor	Chris Nisiforou	9,848	31.9	−10.6
Total formal votes		30,845	96.1	−0.3
Informal votes		1,248	3.9	+0.3
Turnout		32,093	95.6	
Liberal hold		Swing	+10.6	

=== Elections in the 1980s ===
1988 Victorian state election: Doncaster
Party	Candidate	Votes	%	±%
Liberal	Victor Perton	14,885	52.95	−2.69
Labor	Steven Tsitas	11,163	39.71	−4.65
Independent	Wayne Wright	1,084	3.86	+3.86
Call to Australia	Guy Salthouse	977	3.48	+3.48
Total formal votes		28,109	96.41	−1.36
Informal votes		1,048	3.59	+1.36
Turnout		29,157	93.56	−0.93
Two-party-preferred result
Liberal	Victor Perton	16,143	57.43	+1.79
Labor	Steven Tsitas	11,964	42.57	−1.79
Liberal hold		Swing	+1.79	

1985 Victorian state election: Doncaster
Party	Candidate	Votes	%	±%
Liberal	Morris Williams	14,635	55.6	+5.5
Labor	William Poppins	11,666	44.4	+3.8
Total formal votes		26,301	97.8	
Informal votes		600	2.2	
Turnout		26,901	94.5	
Liberal hold		Swing	+1.4	

1982 Victorian state election: Doncaster
Party	Candidate	Votes	%	±%
Liberal	Morris Williams	16,026	51.9	−2.2
Labor	Peter Cleeland	12,242	39.7	+5.6
Democrats	Lynden Kenyon	2,594	8.4	−2.8
Total formal votes		30,862	98.0	+0.2
Informal votes		643	2.0	−0.2
Turnout		31,505	95.4	+0.7
Two-party-preferred result
Liberal	Morris Williams	17,128	55.5	−5.4
Labor	Peter Cleeland	13,734	44.5	+5.4
Liberal hold		Swing	−5.4	

=== Elections in the 1970s ===
1979 Victorian state election: Doncaster
Party	Candidate	Votes	%	±%
Liberal	Morris Williams	15,268	54.1	+0.9
Labor	Jean Downing	9,629	34.1	+7.2
Democrats	Sydney Poulter	3.166	11.2	+11.2
Australia	Max Mand	147	0.5	+0.5
Total formal votes		28,210	97.8	−0.7
Informal votes		632	2.2	+0.7
Turnout		28,842	94.7	+0.7
Two-party-preferred result
Liberal	Morris Williams	17,191	60.9	−5.0
Labor	Jean Downing	11,019	39.1	+5.0
Liberal hold		Swing	−5.0	

1976 Victorian state election: Doncaster
Party	Candidate	Votes	%	±%
Liberal	Morris Williams	14,014	53.2	−1.6
Labor	Francis Smith	7,078	26.9	−5.3
Independent	Edward Ajani	4,331	16.4	+16.4
Democratic Labor	Margaret Coogan	915	3.5	−3.2
Total formal votes		26,338	96.8	
Informal votes		920	3.2	
Turnout		26,740	94.0	
Two-party-preferred result
Liberal	Morris Williams	17,360	65.9	+2.3
Labor	Francis Smith	8,978	34.1	−2.3
Liberal hold		Swing	+2.3	
