= 2025 Werribee state by-election =

- 8 February 2025

Electoral district of Werribee in the Victorian Legislative Assembly
- Registered: 56,464
- Turnout: 45,120 (79.9% ▼5.7)

	First party	Second party	Third party
Candidate	John Lister	Steve Murphy	Paul Hopper
Party	Labor	Liberal	Independent
Primary vote	12,168	12,207	6,134
Percentage	28.89%	28.98%	14.56%
Swing	▼16.47	▲3.65	▲8.66
TPP	50.82	49.18
TPP swing	▼10.10	▲10.10
- Location of the electoral district of Werribee
MP before election
Tim Pallas
Labor
Elected MP
John Lister
Labor

The 2025 Werribee state by-election was held on 8 February 2025 to elect the member for Werribee in the Victorian Legislative Assembly, following the resignation of Labor MP Tim Pallas. It took place on the same day as a by-election for Prahran.

On 19 February 2025, the Victorian Electoral Commission (VEC) declared Labor candidate John Lister as the winner of the by-election by 0.82% or 693 votes.

== Background ==
=== Seat details ===
Werribee is located in the rapidly growing outer south west suburbs of Melbourne, covering the suburbs of Werribee, Wyndham Vale, and the rural areas surrounding these suburbs to the south and west. The seat, along with the electoral districts of Tarneit and Lara which covered the seat's area between 2002 and 2014, has been continuously held by Labor since 1979.

At the time of the 2021 Australian census, the seat had a median weekly personal income of $784, lower than the state ($803) and national ($805) averages. Less than a quarter of residents hold a bachelor's degree or higher (24.1%), a figure lower than the state (29.2%) and national (26.3%) figures, and the median age of residents (34) is slightly younger than both the state and national rates (38).

=== 2022 election results ===
2022 Victorian state election: Werribee
Party	Candidate	Votes	%	±%
Labor	Tim Pallas	17,512	45.4	−0.6
Liberal	Mia Shaw	9,779	25.3	+8.7
Greens	Jack Boddeke	2,613	6.8	+0.3
Independent	Paul Hopper	2,278	5.9	+5.9
Victorian Socialists	Sue Munro	1,391	3.6	+3.6
Family First	Matthew Emerson	964	2.5	+2.5
Democratic Labour	Kathryn Breakwell	767	2.0	−1.2
Animal Justice	Josh Segrave	730	1.9	+1.9
Justice	Patricia Anne Wicks	709	1.8	+1.8
Freedom	Mark Strother	663	1.7	+1.7
Transport Matters	Trevor Russell Collins	360	0.9	+0.9
New Democrats	Prashant Tandon	319	0.8	+0.8
Health Australia	Karen Hogan	260	0.7	+0.7
Independent	Patrizia Barcatta	213	0.6	+0.6
Independent	Heni Cazlynn Kwan	45	0.1	+0.1
Total formal votes		38,603	90.3	−2.9
Informal votes		4,156	9.7	+2.9
Turnout		42,759	85.6	+4.5
Two-party-preferred result
Labor	Tim Pallas	23,517	60.9	−2.4
Liberal	Mia Shaw	15,086	39.1	+2.4
Labor hold		Swing	−2.4	

== Key events ==
- 6 January 2025 − Tim Pallas resigns
- 13 January 2025 − Close of electoral roll
- 23 January 2025 – Candidate nominations close for registered parties
- 24 January 2025 – Candidate nominations close for independents
- 29 January 2025 − Early voting begins
- 8 February 2025 − Polling day

== Candidates ==
Candidates are listed in the order they appeared on the ballot.

Party	Candidate	Background
Greens	Rifai A. Raheem	Community activist and union organiser
Liberal	Steve Murphy	Real estate agent and former police officer
Family First	Matt Emerson	Community volunteer and small business IT professional
Legalise Cannabis	Xavier Menta	Horticulturist
Independent	Munish Joshi	
Victorian Socialists	Sue Munro	Community activist and agency-enrolled nurse
Animal Justice	Shohre Mansouri Jajaee	Software engineer and charity worker
Independent	Kodei Mulcahy	Community activist and childcare educator
Independent	Aidan McLindon	Mayor of Whittlesea and former Queensland MP
Independent	Paul Hopper	Candidate for Werribee in 2022 and co-founder of unregistered West Party
Labor	John Lister	Teacher and CFA volunteer firefighter
Independent	Aijaz Moinuddin	Founder of unregistered United People's Party

=== Labor ===
Labor announced on 23 December 2024 that John Lister, a local school teacher and Country Fire Authority (CFA) volunteer firefighter, would be its candidate for the by-election.

=== Liberal ===
On 22 December 2024, the Liberal Party publicly confirmed that they indicated to contest the by-election. On 11 January 2025, the party announced its candidate would be Steve Murphy, a real estate agent and former police officer who resides in Essendon West.

=== Others ===
The Victorian Greens announced on 10 January 2025 that Rifai A. Raheem, a community activist and union organiser, would be its candidate.

== How-to-vote cards ==
Candidates can provide how-to-vote cards with recommendations for voters on how to preference other parties. Kodei Mulcahy and Paul Hopper did not recommend any preferences, while Aidan McLindon only suggested preferencing Hopper second. Additionally, the Victorian Trades Hall Council registered a how-to-vote card, calling for Liberal candidate Steve Murphy to be preferenced last.

Candidate	How-to-vote card (read column top down)											
Candidate	GRN	LIB	FFP	LCV	Jos.	VS	AJP	Mul.	McL.	Hop.	ALP	Moi.
Rifai A. Raheem (GRN)	1	10	12	3	11	2	4				2	7
Steve Murphy (LIB)	6	1	2	9	3	8	9				8	11
Matt Emerson (FFP)	12	2	1	12	10	9	11				9	4
Xavier Menta (LCV)	4	9	11	1	9	4	2				3	8
Munish Joshi (Ind.)	8	5	6	5	1	10	6				10	3
Sue Munro (VS)	2	11	9	7	5	1	3				5	6
Shohre Mansouri Jajaee (AJP)	5	8	10	2	7	3	1				4	5
Kodei Mulcahy (Ind.)	11	12	7	10	4	11	12	1			12	12
Aidan McLindon (Ind.)	10	3	3	11	8	12	10		1		11	9
Paul Hopper (Ind.)	7	4	4	8	12	7	8		2	1	6	2
John Lister (ALP)	3	7	8	6	2	5	7				1	10
Aijaz Moinuddin (Ind.)	9	6	5	4	6	6	5				7	1

== Results ==
2025 Werribee state by-election
Party	Candidate	Votes	%	±%
Liberal	Steve Murphy	12,207	28.98	+3.65
Labor	John Lister	12,168	28.89	−16.47
Independent	Paul Hopper	6,134	14.56	+8.66
Greens	Rifai A. Raheem	3,190	7.57	+0.80
Victorian Socialists	Sue Munro	3,008	7.14	+3.54
Legalise Cannabis	Xavier Menta	2,316	5.50	+5.50
Family First	Matt Emerson	1,827	4.34	+1.84
Animal Justice	Shohre Mansouri Jajaee	401	0.95	−0.94
Independent	Munish Joshi	352	0.84	+0.84
Independent	Aidan McLindon	270	0.64	+0.64
Independent	Aijaz Moinuddin	164	0.39	+0.39
Independent	Kodei Mulcahy	80	0.19	+0.19
Total formal votes		42,117	93.34	+3.06
Informal votes		3,003	6.66	−3.06
Turnout		45,120	79.91	−5.67
Two-party-preferred result
Labor	John Lister	21,405	50.82	−10.10
Liberal	Steve Murphy	20,712	49.18	+10.10
Labor hold		Swing	−10.10	
