= John Lister (Victorian politician) =

MP for Werribee from 2025

- Lister in 2026

Member of the Victorian Legislative Assembly for Werribee
- Incumbent
- Assumed office 8 February 2025
- Preceded by: Tim Pallas

Personal details
- Party: Labor
- Occupation: Politician; Teacher

John Francis William Lister is an Australian politician serving as the MP for Werribee following the 2025 Werribee state by-election. He is a member of the Victorian Labor Party.

== Political career ==
Following the resignation off Tim Pallas who had been the MP for Werribee since 2006, Lister was preselected as the Labor candidate for the 2025 Werribee state by-election. Lister successfully held the seat despite a heavy swing against him. Shortly after his election, Lister spoke in parliament as "someone who was very recently on teacher wages" to argue that "our teacher wages match what we are doing".

== Personal life ==
Lister lives in Werribee with his partner. Prior to his election to Parliament, Lister was a teacher at Wyndham Central College, where he taught English and served as year 10 co-ordinator. He is a volunteer for the Werribee Country Fire Authority and previously worked as a ministerial adviser.

Victorian Legislative Assembly
| Preceded by Tim Pallas | Member for Werribee; 2025–present | Incumbent |
