= Margaret Ray (Australian politician) =

Australian politician

Margaret Ray AM

Member of the Victorian Legislative Assembly for Box Hill
- In office 3 April 1982 – 3 October 1992
- Preceded by: Donald Mackinnon
- Succeeded by: Robert Clark

Personal details
- Born: Margaret Elizabeth Vercoe; 15 July 1933 Melbourne, Victoria, Australia
- Died: 31 May 2017 (aged 83) Blackburn, Victoria, Australia
- Party: Labor Party
- Spouse: George Wilson Ray
- Children: 4
- Education: University of Melbourne
- Profession: Schoolteacher

Margaret Elizabeth Ray AM, née Vercoe (15 July 1933 – 31 May 2017) was an Australian politician.

She was born in Melbourne to Edward Leslie Vercoe, a Methodist minister, and Thelma Alice Tickner. She attended state schools and then Melbourne University, where she acquired a Bachelor of Arts (Honours) and a Diploma of Education and became a schoolteacher. She taught at Wangaratta from 1956 to 1957 and at Greythorn High School from 1968 to 1981.

She joined the Labor Party in 1971 and held a number of positions including president of the Blackburn branch. In 1982 she was elected to the Victorian Legislative Assembly as the member for Box Hill. She held the seat until her defeat in 1992.

Following her political career, Ray was mostly involved in the Uniting Church, including as chair of the congregation at St David's Uniting Church in Canterbury.

She was appointed a Member of the Order of Australia in 2004.

Victorian Legislative Assembly
Preceded by Donald Mackinnon	Member for Box Hill; 1982–1992	Succeeded by Robert Clark
