= George Reid (Victorian politician) =

Australian politician

Sir George Reid

Attorney-General of Victoria
- In office 9 May 1967 – 30 May 1973
- Monarch: Elizabeth II
- Premier: Henry Bolte (1967–72); Rupert Hamer (1972–73)
- Preceded by: Arthur Rylah
- Succeeded by: Vernon Wilcox

Minister of Immigration
- In office 9 May 1967 – 15 December 1970
- Premier: Henry Bolte
- Preceded by: Vernon Wilcox
- Succeeded by: Pat Dickie

Minister of Labour and Industry
- In office 14 February 1956 – 1 December 1965
- Premier: Henry Bolte
- Preceded by: John Bloomfield
- Succeeded by: Vernon Wilcox

Member for Box Hill
- In office 28 May 1955 – 18 May 1973
- Preceded by: Bob Gray
- Succeeded by: Morris Williams

Member for Box Hill
- In office 8 November 1947 – 5 December 1952
- Preceded by: Bob Gray
- Succeeded by: Bob Gray

Personal details
- Born: George Oswald Reid; 22 July 1903 Hawthorn, Victoria
- Died: 18 February 1993 (aged 89) Macleod, Victoria
- Party: Liberal Country Party
- Education: University of Melbourne (LLB)

Military service
- Allegiance: Australia
- Branch/service: Royal Australian Air Force
- Years of service: 1940–1946
- Rank: Wing Commander
- Battles/wars: Second World War

Sir George Oswald Reid, QC (22 July 1903 – 18 February 1993) was an Australian politician.

Reid was born in Hawthorn, Victoria, to railway officer George Watson Reid and Lillias Margaret Easton. He attended Camberwell Grammar School and Scotch College, Melbourne, and studied law at the University of Melbourne and in 1926 was admitted as a barrister and solicitor, practising at the bar until 1927 and as a solicitor thereafter. In 1947 he was elected to the Victorian Legislative Assembly as the Liberal member for Box Hill. He was party whip from 1950 to 1952, when he was defeated. Returned in 1955, he became cabinet secretary and minister without portfolio. In 1956 he became Minister of Labour and Industry, moving to Fuel and Power in 1965, and to Immigration (until 1970) and Attorney-General in 1967. He was leader of the Assembly from 1971 to 1972. Reid retired in 1973, having taken silk in 1971 and been knighted in 1972. He died in 1993.

Victorian Legislative Assembly
Preceded by Bob Gray	Member for Box Hill; 1947–1952	Succeeded by Bob Gray
Preceded by Bob Gray	Member for Box Hill; 1955–1973	Succeeded by Morris Williams
