= Neville Hudson =

Australian politician

The Honourable Neville Hudson MP

Member of the Victorian Legislative Assembly for Werribee
- In office 1 March 1976 – 1 March 1979
- Preceded by: New seat
- Succeeded by: Ken Coghill

Personal details
- Born: Neville Read Hudson; 29 July 1923 Brighton, Victoria, Australia
- Died: 29 July 1980 (aged 57)
- Party: Liberal
- Spouse: Valda Ellis (1947; until his death)
- Children: Three
- Education: Brighton Grammar School
- Occupation: Dry cleaning proprietor

Neville Read Hudson DFC (10 October 1923 – 29 July 1980) was an Australian politician.

== Early life and family ==
Neville Hudson was born in Brighton to accountant William Read Hudson and Nellie Frances Marion Downe. He attended Brighton Grammar School, and from 1941 to 1945 was a heavy bomber pilot with the Royal Australian Air Force, receiving the Distinguished Service Cross. From 1945 to 1947 he worked with the CSIRO, and from 1948 ran a dry cleaning business in Werribee. On 19 December 1947 he married Valda Ellis, with whom he had three sons. He had a farm at Bega from 1964 to 1970, after which he returned to Werribee.

== Political career ==
A member of the Liberal Party, he was a Werribee Shire Councillor from 1961 to 1964 and from 1971 to 1978, serving as president from 1975 to 1976. In 1976 he was elected to the Victorian Legislative Assembly as the member for Werribee. His health declined from 1978 and he did not re-contest in 1979, dying at Werribee the following year.

Victorian Legislative Assembly
New seat	Member for Werribee; 1976–1979	Succeeded by Ken Coghill
