= Paul Hamer =

Australian politician

The Honourable Paul Hamer MP
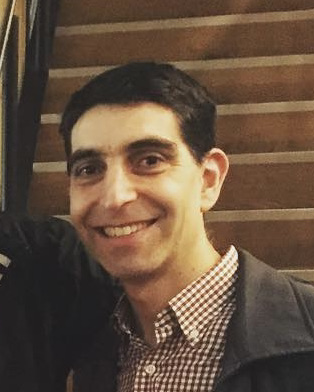

Minister for Roads and Road Safety
- Incumbent
- Assumed office 4 August 2026
- Premier: Ben Carroll
- Preceded by: Ros Spence
Other ministerial offices
Minister for Local Government
In office 15 April 2026 – 4 August 2026
Premier	Jacinta Allan
Preceded by	Nick Staikos
Succeeded by	Tim Richardson
Minister for Corrections
In office 15 April 2026 – 4 August 2026
Premier	Jacinta Allan
Preceded by	Enver Erdogan
Succeeded by	Ros Spence
Minister for Youth Justice
In office 15 April 2026 – 4 August 2026
Premier	Jacinta Allan
Preceded by	Enver Erdogan
Succeeded by	Ros Spence

Member of the Victorian Legislative Assembly for Box Hill
- Incumbent
- Assumed office 24 November 2018
- Preceded by: Robert Clark

Personal details
- Party: Labor
- Website: paulhamermp.com.au

Paul Hamer is an Australian politician. He has been a Labor Party member of the Victorian Legislative Assembly since November 2018, representing the seat of Box Hill.

== Early life ==
Hamer grew up in the eastern suburbs of Melbourne. He is Jewish. His father is a survivor of the Holocaust, and in his first speech to Parliament Hamer said, "after the horrors of the Holocaust it was Australia that gave my family a home".

Hamer went to school in Burwood. He attended Mount Scopus Memorial College and Bialik College.

Hamer was a civil engineer before his election in 2018. He is the first member of his family to be a member of a political party.

== Political career ==
Hamer was elected as the State MP for the seat of Box Hill in November 2018. He was the first Labor candidate to win the seat in 26 years.

In October 2019, Hamer gained attention for publicly raising the flag of China over the Box Hill police station on the National Day of the People's Republic of China.

In April 2026, Hamer was elevated to a cabinet position, becoming state minister for Local Government; Corrections; and Youth Justice. Following Jacinta Allan's resignation and Ben Carroll's subsequent election as premier, Hamer was appointed Minister for Roads and Road Safety on 4 August 2026.

== Personal life ==
Hamer is married with two children.

Parliament of Victoria
Preceded by Robert Clark	Member for Box Hill; 2018–present	Incumbent
