= Bob Gray (Australian politician) =

Australian politician

Robert John Gray (8 March 1898 – 2 August 1978) was an Australian politician.

He was born in Brunswick to farmer Matthew Gray and Susan Jane Saggers. He served in World War I with the AIF, and after the war studied commerce in London. In 1920 he married Emily Myrtle Ireland, with whom he had four children. He worked for Nunawading Shire Council and Box Hill City Council as a health inspector. In 1943 he was elected to the Victorian Legislative Assembly in a by-election for the seat of Nunawading, representing the Labor Party. He transferred to Box Hill in 1945, but was defeated in 1947. He returned to the Assembly in 1952 and was briefly a minister without portfolio in 1955, in which year he was defeated for a second time. Gray had been widowed and married Mary Byrne in 1952. He died at Heidelberg in 1978.

Victorian Legislative Assembly
| Preceded by Ivy Weber | Member for Nunawading; 1943–1945 | Abolished |
| New seat | Member for Box Hill; 1945–1947 | Succeeded by George Reid |
| Preceded by George Reid | Member for Box Hill; 1952–1955 | Succeeded by George Reid |
