= Robert Clark (Australian politician) =

Australian politician (born 1957)

The Honourable Robert Clark
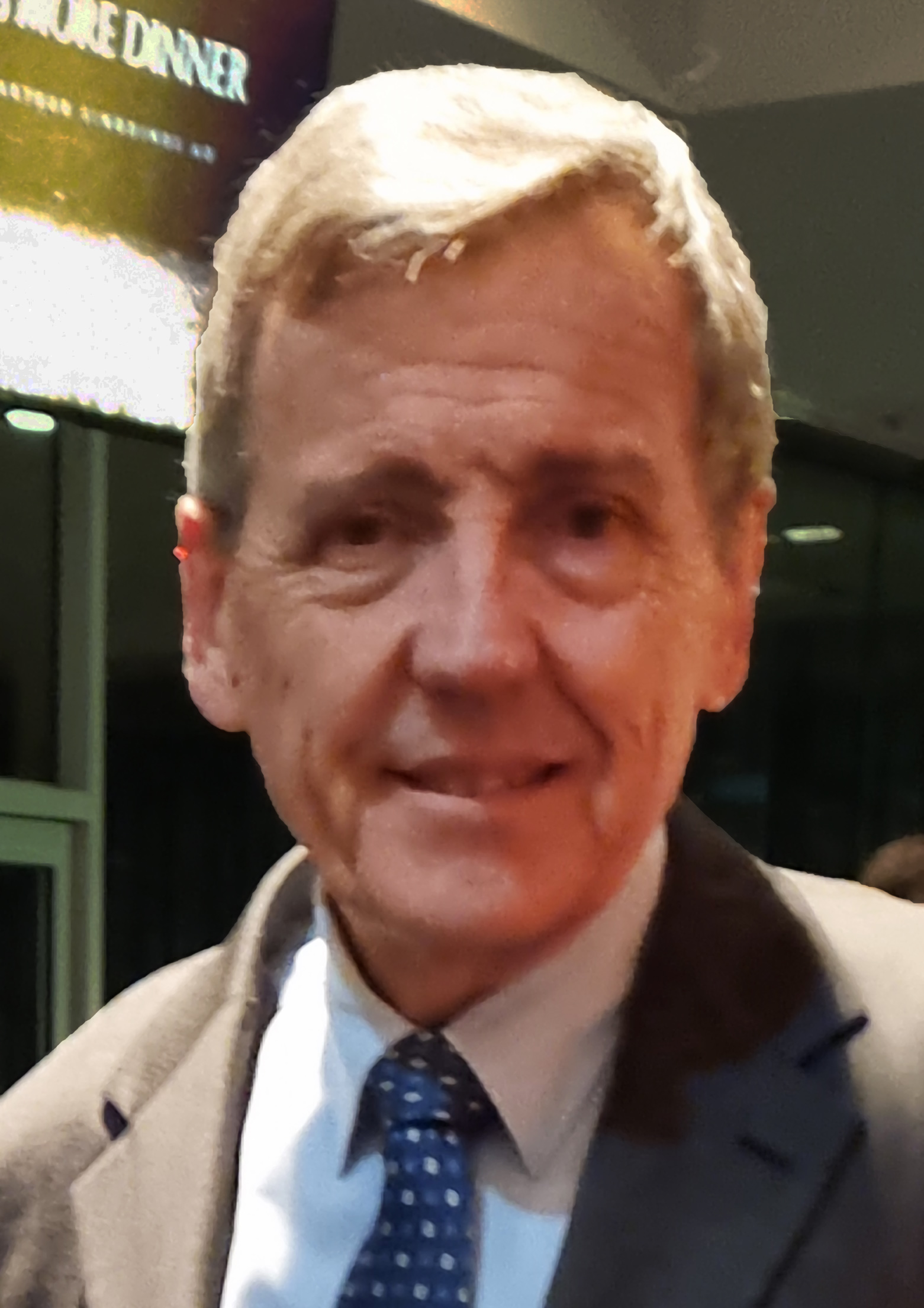

52nd Attorney-General of Victoria
- In office 2 December 2010 – 4 December 2014
- Premier: Denis Napthine
- Preceded by: Rob Hulls
- Succeeded by: Martin Pakula

Member of the Victorian Parliament for Box Hill
- In office 3 October 1992 – 24 November 2018
- Preceded by: Margaret Ray
- Succeeded by: Paul Hamer

Member of the Victorian Parliament for Balwyn
- In office 1 October 1988 – 2 October 1992
- Preceded by: Jim Ramsay
- Succeeded by: Seat abolished

Personal details
- Born: 11 March 1957 (age 69) Melbourne, Australia
- Party: Liberal

Robert William Clark (born 11 March 1957) is an Australian former politician. He was a Liberal Party member of the Victorian Legislative Assembly from 1988 to 2018, representing the electorates of Balwyn (1988–1992) and Box Hill (1992–2018). He served as Attorney-General and Minister for Finance in the Baillieu Ministry and Napthine Ministry from 2010 to 2014, and also served as Minister for Industrial Relations under Napthine from 2013 to 2014. He had previously served as Parliamentary Secretary to the Treasurer (1992–1996) and Parliamentary Secretary for Treasury and Multimedia (1996–1999) during the Kennett government.

== Early life ==
Having attended both St. Albans High School and University High School, Clark undertook his tertiary education at the University of Melbourne, obtaining his BCom (Hons) in 1980, an LLB in 1982 and a BA in 1986.

== Student activism ==
Whilst at university, Clark became active in both the Melbourne University Liberal Club and the Australian Liberal Students' Federation, serving as the president (1979–81) and vice-president (1981–82) respectively of those organisations.

While serving also as the treasurer of the Melbourne University Students' Representative Council (1976–77), Clark was responsible for legal proceedings brought against the university concerning the collection of the student service fee. The action challenged the right of the University Council to award such funds to the SRC, and the subsequent right of the SRC to allocate those funds to the Australian Union of Students.

In what was called the Kaye Judgement, the court ruled that the Student Service Fee was not a fee for services provided but was essentially a tax or charge. It was further ruled that the University of Melbourne was a "public authority exercising legislative powers", in that the university was unduly exercising a power in the absence of legislative approval from Parliament. Clark's instrumental role in these actions resulted in significant changes to the law relating to student unionism in Victoria.

== Entry into politics ==
Clark joined the Liberal Party in 1976. He was an executive member of the Victorian Young Liberal Movement in 1986 and was vice-chairman of the Deakin Electorate Committee from 1986 to 1988. He has also been a member of the Party's Constitutional Committee since 1987.

== Member of Victorian State Parliament ==
After working as a solicitor practicing in commercial, financial and labour law from 1983 to 1988, Clark was elected to the Victorian Legislative Assembly seat of Balwyn on 1 October 1988. Following the division of electorate boundaries in 1991, Clark successfully sought re-election in the seat of Box Hill and subsequently assumed the role of Parliamentary Secretary to the Victorian Treasurer, Alan Stockdale, in 1992.

From 1992 to 1999 he convened the Parliamentary Coalition's Treasury and Finance Committee. He was a member of the Coalition's Attorney-General's Committee 1992–1999, Education Committee 1992–1996, Tertiary Education Committee 1996–1999 and Multimedia Committee 1996–1999.

Following the 1996 Victorian state election, Clark was appointed as Parliamentary Secretary, Treasury and Multimedia, a position he held until the Coalition lost Government in October 1999.

From October 1999 until September 2001, Clark was Shadow Minister for Planning (including Major Projects) and Shadow Minister for WorkCover, from September 2001 to August 2002 was Shadow Treasurer, Shadow Minister for Finance and Shadow Minister for WorkCover and from August 2002 to November 2002 was Shadow Minister for Finance, Shadow Assistant Treasurer, Shadow Minister for WorkCover and Shadow Minister for Gaming. In November 2002, Clark assumed the post of Shadow Treasurer and held the position until December 2006.

In December 2006, Clark was appointed as Shadow Attorney General, Shadow Minister for Industrial Relations, Shadow Minister for Information and Communication Technology and Shadow Minister for Energy and Resources. Following the Coalition's win at the 2010 state election, Clark was appointed Attorney-General of Victoria on 2 December 2010. After the defeat of the Coalition at the 2014 state election, Clark unsuccessfully contested the deputy leadership of the Liberal Party.

Clark lost his seat in the 2018 election, suffering a nearly 8-point swing against him. Clark had held the seat or its predecessor for three decades. Shortly after his defeat, the Victorian branch of the Liberal Party elected him as its president, succeeding Michael Kroger.

Clark led a group of party moderates dedicated to stamping out religious right influences on the party and accused them of branch stacking. Former Victorian premier Jeff Kennett indicated that there were widespread internal issues within the Victorian Liberal Party under Clark's presidency. In response to Kennett's move against him, Clark's supporters attempted to talk up his standing in the party.

Victorian Legislative Assembly
Preceded by Jim Ramsay	Member for Balwyn; 1988–1992	Seat abolished
Preceded by Margaret Ray	Member for Box Hill; 1992–2018	Succeeded by Paul Hamer
Political offices
Preceded by Rob Hulls	Attorney-General of Victoria; 2010–2014	Succeeded by Martin Pakula
