= Electoral district of Doncaster =

Former state electoral district of Victoria, Australia

Doncaster Victoria—Legislative Assembly
- State: Victoria
- Created: 1976
- Abolished: 2014
- Electors: 36,523 (2010)
- Area: 25 km^{2} (9.7 sq mi)
- Demographic: Metropolitan

The Electoral district of Doncaster was a metropolitan electorate of the Victorian Legislative Assembly, located approximately 13 kilometres north-east of Melbourne. It was part of the Upper House Eastern Metropolitan Region and sat entirely within the City of Manningham. It was abolished and divided between the Electoral district of Bulleen and the Electoral district of Warrandyte The seat was abolished due to new boundary changes in preparation for the 2014 election.

== Profile ==
Doncaster covered 25 square kilometres and comprised the majority of the suburbs of Doncaster, Doncaster East and Donvale, excluding portions of the northern parts of these suburbs, which all lie within the City of Manningham in Melbourne's eastern suburbs. A residential suburban electorate, Doncaster was a moderately hilly area north of the Koonung Creek and west of the Mullum Mullum Creek. Its urban features included predominantly low-density suburban dwellings, gardens and reserves, shopping centres and an abundance of sports amenities.

== History ==
Prior to 1976, the area of Doncaster/Templestowe was included in the seats of South Bourke, Evelyn, Mernda and Box Hill. In 1976, rapidly increasing population led to the split-up of the seat of Box Hill into Doncaster and Box Hill.

== Members for Doncaster ==
Member	Party	Term
Morris Williams	Liberal	1976–1988
Victor Perton	Liberal	1988–2006
Mary Wooldridge	Liberal	2006–2014

== Election results ==
2010 Victorian state election: Doncaster
Party	Candidate	Votes	%	±%
Liberal	Mary Wooldridge	20,417	62.73	+12.18
Labor	Charles Pick	8,500	26.12	−6.55
Greens	Nick Carson	2,616	8.04	+0.64
Family First	Ken Smithies	1,015	3.12	−1.16
Total formal votes		32,548	95.28	−0.73
Informal votes		1,614	4.72	+0.73
Turnout		34,162	93.54	+0.00
Two-party-preferred result
Liberal	Mary Wooldridge	22,020	67.61	+9.49
Labor	Charles Pick	10,549	32.39	−9.49
Liberal hold		Swing	+9.49	
