= Ken Coghill =

Australian politician

The Honourable Dr Ken Coghill MP
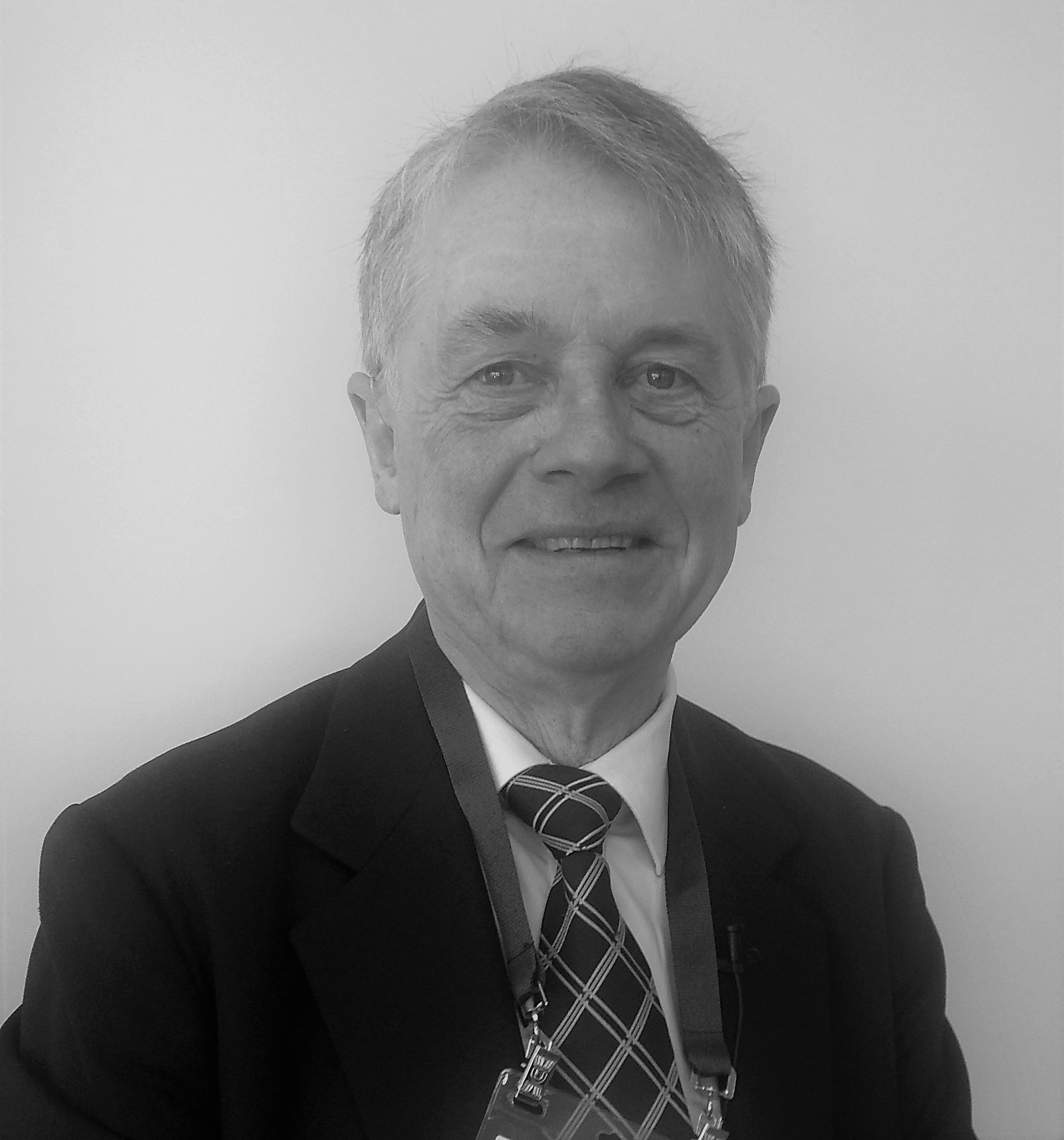

Speaker of the Victorian Legislative Assembly
- In office 25 October 1988 – 26 October 1992
- Premier: John Cain
- Preceded by: Tom Edmunds
- Succeeded by: John Delzoppo

Member of the Victorian Legislative Assembly for Werribee
- In office 5 May 1979 – 30 March 1996
- Preceded by: Neville Hudson
- Succeeded by: Mary Gillett

Personal details
- Born: Kenneth Alistair Coghill; 10 November 1944 (age 81) Mansfield, Victoria, Australia
- Party: Labor
- Spouse(s): Judith Wakeman (m.1969; div.2007); Julia Thornton (m.2008)
- Children: One
- Education: Monash University (PhD); University of Melbourne (BVSc)

Kenneth Alistair Coghill (born 10 November 1944 in Mansfield, Victoria) is a former Australian politician.

== Life and career ==
Educated at Caulfield Grammar School, Coghill studied veterinary science at the University of Melbourne and worked as a veterinarian before serving on the Wodonga City Council. He entered the Victorian Legislative Assembly as a Labor Party Member for Werribee in the 1979 State elections, and served as the Speaker of the Victorian Legislative Assembly from 1988 to 1992.

After retiring from Parliament in 1995, he earned a Ph.D. from the University of Melbourne. He is currently an associate professor at Monash University.

== See also ==
- List of Caulfield Grammar School people
