= Electoral district of Box Hill =

State electoral district of Victoria, Australia

Coordinates: 37.81°S 145.12°E

Box Hill Victoria—Legislative Assembly
- Interactive map of electoral district boundaries from the 2022 state election
- State: Victoria
- Created: 1945
- MP: Paul Hamer
- Party: Labor
- Namesake: Suburb of Box Hill
- Electors: 48,260 (2022)
- Area: 29 km^{2} (11.2 sq mi)
- Demographic: Metropolitan
Electorates around Box Hill:
Kew	Bulleen	Warrandyte
Hawthorn	Box Hill	Ringwood
Ashwood	Ashwood	Glen Waverley

The electoral district of Box Hill is an electoral district of the Victorian Legislative Assembly, covering an area of 29 square kilometres (11 sq mi) in eastern Melbourne. It contains the suburbs of Box Hill, Box Hill North, Box Hill South, Mont Albert, Mont Albert North, most of Blackburn, Blackburn North, and Blackburn South, and parts of Balwyn North, Burwood, Burwood East, and Surrey Hills.

It lies within the Eastern Metropolitan Region in the upper house, the Legislative Council.

== Electoral boundary changes ==
The electoral district of Doncaster was split off from Box Hill and created in 1976 due to population growth.

A redistribution of electorate boundaries in 1991 abolished the Balwyn electorate and incorporated most of it into Box Hill. A large part of the Box Hill electorate (with 17,290 electors) was also transferred to Mitcham. These changes took effect at the 1992 Victorian state election.

For the 2014 election, the boundaries of Box Hill moved eastwards. Balwyn North was moved to the electorate of Kew and part of Surrey Hills were moved to Burwood and Hawthorn. The former electorate of Mitcham was abolished so Blackburn, Nunawading and part of Forest Hill were moved into Box Hill. The Liberal margin in Box Hill was estimated to fall from 13.8 percentage points to an estimated 9.4.

== Members for Box Hill ==
Member	Party	Term
Bob Gray	Labor	1945–1947
George Reid	Liberal	1947–1952
Bob Gray	Labor	1952–1955
(Sir) George Reid	Liberal	1955–1973
Morris Williams	Liberal	1973–1976
Donald Mackinnon	Liberal	1976–1982
Margaret Ray	Labor	1982–1992
Robert Clark	Liberal	1992–2018
Paul Hamer	Labor	2018–present

== Election results ==
2022 Victorian state election: Box Hill
Party	Candidate	Votes	%	±%
Labor	Paul Hamer	18,340	41.3	+0.4
Liberal	Nicole Werner	15,593	35.2	−8.9
Greens	Joanne Shan	6,267	14.1	+0.7
Democratic Labour	Paul Dean	1,083	2.4	+2.4
Animal Justice	Sebastian Folloni	824	1.9	+1.2
Family First	Gary Ong	809	1.8	+1.8
Freedom	Alicia Riera	541	1.2	+1.2
Independent	Wayne Tseng	464	1.0	+1.0
Independent	Cameron Liston	436	1.0	+1.0
Total formal votes		44,357	96.4	+0.8
Informal votes		1,635	3.6	−0.8
Turnout		45,992	90.5	+2.3
Two-party-preferred result
Labor	Paul Hamer	25,383	57.2	+4.1
Liberal	Nicole Werner	18,973	42.8	−4.1
Labor hold		Swing	+4.1	

Two-party-preferred vote results in Box Hill View source data.
