= Electoral district of Werribee =

State electoral district of Victoria, Australia

Coordinates: 37°55′S 144°40′E

Werribee Victoria—Legislative Assembly
- Interactive map of electoral district boundaries from the 2022 state election
- State: Victoria
- Dates current: 1976–2002; 2014–present
- MP: John Lister
- Party: Labor
- Namesake: Suburb of Werribee
- Electors: 46,282 (2018)
- Area: 339 km^{2} (130.9 sq mi)
- Demographic: Outer metropolitan

The electoral district of Werribee is an electoral district of the Legislative Assembly in the Australian state of Victoria. It has existed in two incarnations, first from 1976 to 2002, and was created again in the 2013 redistribution and came into effect at the 2014 state election.

Based on the rapidly growing outer south west suburbs of Melbourne, it takes in areas from Tarneit and Lara. It covers the suburbs of Werribee, Wyndham Vale, and the rural areas surrounding these suburbs to the south and west.

Werribee was estimated to be a safe Labor seat with a margin of 11.4%, and was held by Labor with a further 4.2% swing towards them at the 2014 state election.

It was held for over a decade by former Treasurer Tim Pallas, but since the 2025 Werribee state by-election, the division has been held by Labor’s John Lister.

== Members for Werribee ==
=== First incarnation (1976–2002) ===
Image	Member	Party	Term	Notes
	Neville Hudson (1923–1980)	Liberal	20 March 1976 – 5 May 1979	
	Ken Coghill (1944–)	Labor	5 May 1979 – 30 March 1996	Speaker of the Legislative Assembly between 1988 and 1992. Retired
	Mary Gillett (1958–)	Labor	30 March 1996 – 30 November 2002	Moved to Tarneit after seat abolished

=== Second incarnation (2014–present) ===
Image	Member	Party	Term	Notes
	Tim Pallas (1960–)	Labor	29 November 2014 – 6 January 2025	Previously member for Tarneit. Treasurer of Victoria from 2014 until 2024. Resigned
	John Lister	Labor	8 February 2025 – present	Won by-election. Incumbent

== Election results ==
2025 Werribee state by-election
Party	Candidate	Votes	%	±%
Liberal	Steve Murphy	12,207	28.98	+3.65
Labor	John Lister	12,168	28.89	−16.47
Independent	Paul Hopper	6,134	14.56	+8.66
Greens	Rifai A. Raheem	3,190	7.57	+0.80
Victorian Socialists	Sue Munro	3,008	7.14	+3.54
Legalise Cannabis	Xavier Menta	2,316	5.50	+5.50
Family First	Matt Emerson	1,827	4.34	+1.84
Animal Justice	Shohre Mansouri Jajaee	401	0.95	−0.94
Independent	Munish Joshi	352	0.84	+0.84
Independent	Aidan McLindon	270	0.64	+0.64
Independent	Aijaz Moinuddin	164	0.39	+0.39
Independent	Kodei Mulcahy	80	0.19	+0.19
Total formal votes		42,117	93.34	+3.06
Informal votes		3,003	6.66	−3.06
Turnout		45,120	79.91	−5.67
Two-party-preferred result
Labor	John Lister	21,405	50.82	−10.10
Liberal	Steve Murphy	20,712	49.18	+10.10
Labor hold		Swing	−10.10	
