= Donald James Mackinnon =

English-born Australian politician

Donald James Mackinnon (1 November 1928 – 1 October 2017) was an English-born Australian politician.

He was born in London to the business executive and diplomat Donald Mackinnon (son of politician Donald Mackinnon) and Mary Hindle James. His uncle, Dan Mackinnon, became an Australian federal politician in the 1950s. Mackinnon was educated at St George's College in Buenos Aires and then at Geelong Grammar School. He attended the University of Melbourne, where he received a Bachelor of Science degree. He received a second such degree from Oxford University in 1953. From 1954, he worked as an executive with the Shell Oil Company. In 1976, he was elected to the Victorian Legislative Assembly for Box Hill for the Liberal Party. He was defeated in 1982.

Victorian Legislative Assembly
Preceded by Morris Williams	Member for Box Hill; 1976–1982	Succeeded by Margaret Ray
