= Morris Williams (politician) =

Australian politician

Morris Thomas Williams (10 April 1924 – 28 October 1995) was an Australian politician.

He was born in Swan Hill to farmer Leslie George Williams and Anna Louisa Morris. He attended local state schools and then studied at Melbourne University, earning a Bachelor of Commerce and a Bachelor of Arts (Honours). From 1945 to 1946 he was a research assistant in the public service, and then with the Institute of Public Affairs. On 29 November 1950 he married Agnes Turner; they had a daughter; Heather Agnes on 26 November 1951. An economist, Williams was a Shire of Doncaster councillor from 1962 to 1968 and from 1970 to 1973, serving as mayor from 1965 to 1966.

In 1973 he was elected to the Victorian Legislative Assembly as the Liberal member for Box Hill, transferring to Doncaster in 1976. He was a backbencher until his retirement in 1988.

Victorian Legislative Assembly
Preceded by George Reid	Member for Box Hill; 1973–1976	Succeeded by Donald Mackinnon
New seat	Member for Doncaster; 1976–1988	Succeeded by Victor Perton
