= John Mullahy =

Australian politician

John Mullahy MP

Member of the Victorian Legislative Assembly for Glen Waverley
- Incumbent
- Assumed office 26 November 2022

Personal details
- Born: 14 December 1982 (age 43) Geelong, Victoria, Australia
- Party: Labor
- Children: 1
- Committees: Legislative Assembly Economy and Infrastructure Committee
- Website: johnmullahy.com.au

John Mullahy (born 14 December 1982) is an Australian politician. He has been a member of the Victorian Legislative Assembly since November 2022, and is the first Labor Member to represent Glen Waverley District.

Since his election, Mullahy has overseen and advocated for major investment into the Glen Waverley District, including in schools, open space and the Suburban Rail Loop.

Mullahy has also been appointed as a member of the Legislative Assembly Economy and Infrastructure Committee.

== Political Involvement ==
Mullahy first became involved in the Australian Labor Party during the Abbott Government, citing strong dissatisfaction with the government's divisive and right wing politics. He initially became a member of the Waverley West Branch of the Labor Party, volunteering on campaigns for Anna Burke and Matt Fregon.

Upon Matt Fregon's surprise victory at the 2018 Victorian State Election, Mullahy decided to work full time as an electorate officer, providing constituency services to the then Mount Waverley District.

== Member for Glen Waverley District ==
In the lead up to the 2022 Victorian State Election, the Victorian Electoral Commission divided the District of Mount Waverley into two new Districts – Ashwood and Glen Waverley. Matt Fregon MP became Labor's Candidate for Ashwood, while Mullahy became the Labor Candidate for Glen Waverley.

The Glen Waverley District is also composed of parts of the previous Forest Hill District, and was contested by Neil Angus MP, the three-term incumbent Liberal Member for Forest Hill. Mullahy won Glen Waverley following an 8% collapse in the Liberal primary vote, and a 4% swing to Labor, on a two-party preferred basis.

Since his election, Mullahy has been appointed as a member of the Legislative Assembly Economy and Infrastructure Committee. He voiced strong support for investment in local schools such as Brentwood Secondary, Glen Waverley Secondary, Vermont Secondary and Forest Hill College. Mullahy advocated for the Andrews Government's dedicated public elective surgical centre in Blackburn and the expansion of free, extended hours Priority Primary Care Clinics into his electorate.

Both during the election campaign, and in his term as Member of the Victorian Legislative Assembly, John has been actively supportive of the Suburban Rail Loop, which will connect Glen Waverley Station with employment, education and health precincts across Melbourne.

In his inaugural speech, Mullahy highlighted his Irish heritage in shaping his progressive views. He is a vocal supporter of LGBTIQ+ rights, strong climate action and women's reproductive rights, and has spoken against the negative consequences of gambling.

== Personal life ==
Mullahy was born in Geelong to Irish immigrant parents. He grew up in regional Victoria with his four siblings on his parents' farm near Meredith, and attended school in both Ballarat and Geelong. In the years after his secondary schooling, he moved to Melbourne to pursue studies in physics and business. During this period he worked as both a labourer and administrator in his father's construction business before going on to create a small business of his own, focussed on IT and telecommunications. He was the Chief Financial Officer of the business until 2018.

Mullahy was campaign manager of Matt Fregon's successful 2018 run for the Mount Waverley District in the Victorian Parliament. As such from 2019 he decided to serve the community as an electorate officer for Fregon.

Mullahy lives in Glen Waverley, in his electorate.

Victorian Legislative Assembly
New seat	Member for Glen Waverley; 2022–present	Incumbent
