= Electoral results for the district of Forest Hill =

Australian district election results

This is a list of electoral results for the Electoral district of Forest Hill in Victorian state elections.

== Members for Forest Hill ==
Member	Party	Term
John Richardson	Liberal	1976–2002
Kirstie Marshall	Labor	2002–2010
Neil Angus	Liberal	2010–2022

== Election results ==
=== Elections in the 2010s ===
2018 Victorian state election: Forest Hill
Party	Candidate	Votes	%	±%
Liberal	Neil Angus	16,970	48.61	−1.11
Labor	Manoj Kumar	14,164	40.57	+5.37
Greens	Naresh Bhalla	3,083	8.83	−0.08
Independent	Claude Bai	696	1.99	+1.99
Total formal votes		34,913	95.44	−0.29
Informal votes		1,670	4.57	+0.29
Turnout		36,583	91.85	−2.17
Two-party-preferred result
Liberal	Neil Angus	17,858	51.15	−3.67
Labor	Manoj Kumar	17,055	48.85	+3.67
Liberal hold		Swing	−3.67	

2014 Victorian state election: Forest Hill
Party	Candidate	Votes	%	±%
Liberal	Neil Angus	18,340	49.7	+0.9
Labor	Pauline Richards	12,984	35.2	−3.0
Greens	Brewis Atkinson	3,289	8.9	+1.1
Animal Justice	Kane Rogers	999	2.7	+2.7
Christians	Lynne Maddison	561	1.5	+1.5
Family First	Wendy Ross	508	1.4	−0.6
Country Alliance	Melissa Trotter	211	0.6	+0.6
Total formal votes		36,892	95.7	−0.6
Informal votes		1,646	4.3	+0.6
Turnout		38,538	94.0	−1.1
Two-party-preferred result
Liberal	Neil Angus	20,286	54.8	+1.3
Labor	Pauline Richards	16,717	45.2	−1.3
Liberal hold		Swing	+1.3	

2010 Victorian state election: Forest Hill
Party	Candidate	Votes	%	±%
Liberal	Neil Angus	16,043	48.62	+4.28
Labor	Kirstie Marshall	12,796	38.78	−3.29
Greens	Andrew Henley	2,501	7.58	−1.06
Family First	Ivan Stratov	632	1.92	−3.03
Sex Party	Daniel Irwin	614	1.86	+1.86
Democratic Labor	James Fung	411	1.25	+1.25
Total formal votes		32,997	96.29	−0.09
Informal votes		1,271	3.71	+0.09
Turnout		34,268	94.11	−0.06
Two-party-preferred result
Liberal	Neil Angus	17,550	53.17	+3.94
Labor	Kirstie Marshall	15,458	46.83	−3.94
Liberal gain from Labor		Swing	+3.94	

=== Elections in the 2000s ===
2006 Victorian state election: Forest Hill
Party	Candidate	Votes	%	±%
Liberal	Neil Angus	14,757	44.34	+5.68
Labor	Kirstie Marshall	14,002	42.07	−5.05
Greens	Mick Kir	2,874	8.64	−0.27
Family First	Stella Collins	1,648	4.95	+4.95
Total formal votes		33,281	96.38	−0.45
Informal votes		1,250	3.62	+0.45
Turnout		34,531	94.17	+0.03
Two-party-preferred result
Labor	Kirstie Marshall	16,920	50.82	−4.96
Liberal	Neil Angus	16,375	49.18	+4.96
Labor hold		Swing	−4.96	

2002 Victorian state election: Forest Hill
Party	Candidate	Votes	%	±%
Labor	Kirstie Marshall	16,105	47.1	+4.9
Liberal	Vasan Srinivasan	13,213	38.7	−16.7
Greens	Adam Pepper	3,045	8.9	+8.9
Independent	Noel Spurr	1,105	3.2	+3.2
Independent	Rodney Campbell	708	2.1	+2.1
Total formal votes		34,176	96.8	−0.6
Informal votes		1,118	3.2	+0.6
Turnout		35,294	94.1	
Two-party-preferred result
Labor	Kirstie Marshall	19,063	55.8	+12.0
Liberal	Vasan Srinivasan	15,113	44.2	−12.0
Labor gain from Liberal		Swing	+12.0	

=== Elections in the 1990s ===
1999 Victorian state election: Forest Hill
Party	Candidate	Votes	%	±%
Liberal	John Richardson	17,583	55.9	−3.8
Labor	Julie Buxton	12,895	41.0	+3.3
Hope	Sandra Hardiman	1,000	3.2	+3.2
Total formal votes		31,478	97.5	−0.6
Informal votes		816	2.5	+0.6
Turnout		32,294	93.5	
Two-party-preferred result
Liberal	John Richardson	17,974	57.1	−3.4
Labor	Julie Buxton	13,503	42.9	+3.4
Liberal hold		Swing	−3.4	

1996 Victorian state election: Forest Hill
Party	Candidate	Votes	%	±%
Liberal	John Richardson	18,637	59.6	−5.7
Labor	David Finnerty	11,766	37.6	+3.0
Natural Law	Deborah Shay	853	2.7	+2.7
Total formal votes		31,256	98.1	+2.1
Informal votes		608	1.9	−2.1
Turnout		31,864	94.8	
Two-party-preferred result
Liberal	John Richardson	18,793	60.5	−4.8
Labor	David Finnerty	12,271	39.5	+4.8
Liberal hold		Swing	−4.8	

1992 Victorian state election: Forest Hill
Party	Candidate	Votes	%	±%
Liberal	John Richardson	19,989	65.3	+11.9
Labor	Helen Zenkis	10,600	34.7	−11.9
Total formal votes		30,589	96.0	−0.2
Informal votes		1,287	4.0	+0.2
Turnout		31,876	95.5	
Liberal hold		Swing	+11.9	

=== Elections in the 1980s ===
1988 Victorian state election: Forest Hill
Party	Candidate	Votes	%	±%
Liberal	John Richardson	14,557	52.88	−0.99
Labor	John Madden	12,971	47.12	+0.99
Total formal votes		27,528	96.07	−1.48
Informal votes		1,127	3.93	+1.48
Turnout		28,655	93.81	−0.90
Liberal hold		Swing	−0.99	

1985 Victorian state election: Forest Hill
Party	Candidate	Votes	%	±%
Liberal	John Richardson	14,543	53.9	+7.2
Labor	John Madden	12,452	46.1	+1.4
Total formal votes		26,995	97.5	
Informal votes		679	2.5	
Turnout		27,674	94.7	
Liberal hold		Swing	+3.3	

1982 Victorian state election: Forest Hill
Party	Candidate	Votes	%	±%
Liberal	John Richardson	14,816	46.9	−3.4
Labor	Anne Blackburn	14,286	45.2	+5.7
Democrats	Ross Larson	2,476	7.8	−1.9
Total formal votes		31,578	98.2	+0.2
Informal votes		581	1.8	−0.2
Turnout		32,159	95.2	+0.8
Two-party-preferred result
Liberal	John Richardson	15,842	50.2	−4.8
Labor	Anne Blackburn	15,736	49.8	+4.8
Liberal hold		Swing	−4.8	

=== Elections in the 1970s ===
1979 Victorian state election: Forest Hill
Party	Candidate	Votes	%	±%
Liberal	John Richardson	14,745	50.3	−8.0
Labor	Anne Blackburn	11,576	39.5	+3.1
Democrats	John Goodall	2,841	9.7	+9.7
Independent	Wilhelm Kapphan	177	0.6	+0.6
Total formal votes		29,339	98.0	−0.3
Informal votes		594	2.0	+0.3
Turnout		29,933	94.4	+0.6
Two-party-preferred result
Liberal	John Richardson	16,131	55.0	−8.1
Labor	Anne Blackburn	13,208	45.0	+8.1
Liberal hold		Swing	−8.1	

1976 Victorian state election: Forest Hill
Party	Candidate	Votes	%	±%
Liberal	John Richardson	16,065	58.3	+4.1
Labor	Neville Gay	9,993	36.4	+2.0
Democratic Labor	Francis Poole	1,388	5.1	−1.4
Total formal votes		27,446	98.3	
Informal votes		470	1.7	
Turnout		27,916	93.8	
Two-party-preferred result
Liberal	John Richardson	17,314	63.1	+0.9
Labor	Neville Gay	10,132	36.9	−0.9
Liberal hold		Swing	+0.9	
