= Electoral results for the district of Glen Waverley =

Victoria, Australia, district election results

This is a list of electoral results for the district of Glen Waverley in Victorian state elections.

== Members for Glen Waverley ==
First incarnation (1985–2002)
Ross Smith	Liberal	1985–2002
Second incarnation (2022–present)
John Mullahy	Labor	2022–present

== Election results ==
=== Elections in the 2020s ===
==== 2022 ====
2022 Victorian state election: Glen Waverley
Party	Candidate	Votes	%	±%
Labor	John Mullahy	18,153	40.6	−1.5
Liberal	Neil Angus	17,941	40.2	−8.0
Greens	Steph Partridge	4,270	9.6	+1.3
Democratic Labour	Scott Marsh	1,856	4.1	+3.9
Family First	Kristeen Huisman	972	2.2	+2.2
Animal Justice	Maddy Hance	802	1.8	+1.8
Freedom	Joyce Maree Harris	664	1.5	+1.5
Total formal votes		44,667	96.7	+1.5
Informal votes		1,529	3.3	−1.5
Turnout		46,196	90.9	−3.0
Two-party-preferred result
Labor	John Mullahy	23,809	53.3	+4.2
Liberal	Neil Angus	20,858	46.7	−4.2
Labor notional gain from Liberal		Swing	+4.2	

=== Elections in the 1990s ===
==== 1999 ====
1999 Victorian state election: Glen Waverley
Party	Candidate	Votes	%	±%
Liberal	Ross Smith	18,410	63.2	−1.6
Labor	Robert Dalby	10,738	36.8	+4.0
Total formal votes		29,148	97.6	−0.6
Informal votes		714	2.4	+0.6
Turnout		29,862	93.4	−1.4
Liberal hold		Swing	−2.5	

==== 1996 ====
1996 Victorian state election: Glen Waverley
Party	Candidate	Votes	%	±%
Liberal	Ross Smith	19,212	64.8	−2.2
Labor	Pam Pritchard	9,738	32.8	+5.5
Natural Law	Michael Soos	705	2.4	+2.4
Total formal votes		29,655	98.2	+1.4
Informal votes		556	1.8	−1.4
Turnout		30,211	94.8	−1.0
Two-party-preferred result
Liberal	Ross Smith	19,457	65.7	−3.8
Labor	Pam Pritchard	10,172	34.3	+3.8
Liberal hold		Swing	−3.8	

==== 1992 ====
1992 Victorian state election: Glen Waverley
Party	Candidate	Votes	%	±%
Liberal	Ross Smith	19,774	67.0	+13.0
Labor	Ben Moon	8,081	27.4	−12.2
Independent	Peter Olney	1,652	5.6	+2.8
Total formal votes		29,507	96.8	+0.1
Informal votes		991	3.2	−0.1
Turnout		30,498	95.8	
Two-party-preferred result
Liberal	Ross Smith	20,477	69.5	+12.3
Labor	Ben Moon	8,969	30.5	−12.3
Liberal hold		Swing	+12.3	

=== Elections in the 1980s ===
==== 1988 ====
1988 Victorian state election: Glen Waverley
Party	Candidate	Votes	%	±%
Liberal	Ross Smith	16,045	55.88	−4.20
Labor	Ronald Kirkwood	11,415	39.75	−0.17
Call to Australia	Peter Olney	1,254	4.37	+4.37
Total formal votes		28,714	96.53	−1.01
Informal votes		1,032	3.47	+1.01
Turnout		29,746	94.58	−0.95
Two-party-preferred result
Liberal	Ross Smith	16,787	58.46	−1.62
Labor	Ronald Kirkwood	11,927	41.54	+1.62
Liberal hold		Swing	−1.62	

==== 1985 ====
1985 Victorian state election: Glen Waverley
Party	Candidate	Votes	%	±%
Liberal	Ross Smith	16,502	60.1	+8.2
Labor	John Candappa	10,963	39.9	+1.0
Total formal votes		27,465	97.5	
Informal votes		694	2.5	
Turnout		28,159	95.5	
Liberal hold		Swing	+4.3	
