= Electoral results for the district of Mount Waverley =

Australian district election results

This is a list of electoral results for the Electoral district of Mount Waverley in Victorian state elections.

== Members for Mount Waverley ==
Member	Party	Term
Maxine Morand	Labor	2002–2010
Michael Gidley	Liberal	2010–2018
Matt Fregon	Labor	2018–2022

== Election results ==
=== Elections in the 2010s ===
2018 Victorian state election: Mount Waverley
Party	Candidate	Votes	%	±%
Liberal	Michael Gidley	15,495	46.03	−5.12
Labor	Matt Fregon	14,722	43.74	+7.00
Greens	Justin McCarthy	3,444	10.23	+0.67
Total formal votes		33,661	94.94	−1.25
Informal votes		1,795	5.06	+1.25
Turnout		35,456	91.06	−2.23
Two-party-preferred result
Labor	Matt Fregon	17,453	51.85	+6.44
Liberal	Michael Gidley	16,208	48.15	−6.44
Labor gain from Liberal		Swing	+6.44	

2014 Victorian state election: Mount Waverley
Party	Candidate	Votes	%	±%
Liberal	Michael Gidley	18,357	51.2	−1.4
Labor	Jennifer Yang	13,184	36.7	+3.3
Greens	Perky Raj Khangure	3,432	9.6	+2.0
Christians	Stephen Chong Zheng	915	2.6	+2.5
Total formal votes		35,888	96.2	−0.1
Informal votes		1,422	3.8	+0.1
Turnout		37,310	93.3	−1.7
Two-party-preferred result
Liberal	Michael Gidley	19,489	54.6	−4.0
Labor	Jennifer Yang	16,211	45.4	+4.0
Liberal hold		Swing	−4.0	

2010 Victorian state election: Mount Waverley
Party	Candidate	Votes	%	±%
Liberal	Michael Gidley	17,126	51.34	+6.96
Labor	Maxine Morand	11,420	34.23	−7.58
Greens	Josh Fergeus	2,548	7.64	−0.38
Family First	John Canavan	815	2.44	−1.02
Sex Party	Lisa Chevallier	578	1.73	+1.73
Democratic Labor	Des Kelly	535	1.60	+1.60
Independent	Ali Khan	336	1.01	+1.01
Total formal votes		33,358	96.28	+0.19
Informal votes		1,289	3.72	−0.19
Turnout		34,647	93.85	−0.38
Two-party-preferred result
Liberal	Michael Gidley	19,177	57.45	+7.81
Labor	Maxine Morand	14,204	42.55	−7.81
Liberal gain from Labor		Swing	+7.81	

=== Elections in the 2000s ===
2006 Victorian state election: Mount Waverley
Party	Candidate	Votes	%	±%
Liberal	Michael Gidley	14,711	44.4	−0.2
Labor	Maxine Morand	13,858	41.8	−2.6
Greens	John Poppins	2,657	8.0	−0.5
Family First	John Boland	1,147	3.5	+3.5
People Power	Kali Paxinos	574	1.7	+1.7
Independent	N H Smith	198	0.6	+0.6
Total formal votes		33,145	96.1	−0.9
Informal votes		1,347	3.9	+0.9
Turnout		34,492	94.2	
Two-party-preferred result
Labor	Maxine Morand	16,675	50.3	−2.0
Liberal	Michael Gidley	16,470	49.7	+2.0
Labor hold		Swing	−2.0	

2002 Victorian state election: Mount Waverley
Party	Candidate	Votes	%	±%
Liberal	Ron Wilson	14,984	44.6	−14.2
Labor	Maxine Morand	14,902	44.4	+3.6
Greens	John Poppins	2,849	8.5	+8.5
Democrats	Therese Bennett	560	1.7	+1.7
Independent	Matthew Bond	284	0.8	+0.8
Total formal votes		33,579	97.0	−0.6
Informal votes		1,036	3.0	+0.6
Turnout		34,615	94.2	
Two-party-preferred result
Labor	Maxine Morand	17,559	52.3	+11.3
Liberal	Ron Wilson	16,020	47.7	−11.3
Labor gain from Liberal		Swing	+11.3	
