= Electoral results for the district of Ashwood =

Electoral ward results

This is a list of electoral results for the district of Ashwood in Victorian state elections.

== Members for Ashwood ==
Member	Party	Term
Matt Fregon	Labor	2022–present

== Election results ==
=== Elections in the 2020s ===
==== 2022 ====
2022 Victorian state election: Ashwood
Party	Candidate	Votes	%	±%
Labor	Matt Fregon	18,014	40.3	−0.1
Liberal	Asher Judah	16,618	37.2	−7.1
Greens	Peter Morgan	6,612	14.8	+2.7
Animal Justice	Milton Griffiths	880	2.0	+0.5
Family First	Keith Geyer	847	1.9	+1.9
Independent	Lynnette Saloumi	704	1.6	+1.6
Freedom	Norman F. Baker	568	1.3	+1.3
Independent	Michael Doyle	467	1.0	+1.0
Total formal votes		44,710	96.6	+0.7
Informal votes		1,565	3.4	−0.7
Turnout		46,275	90.4	–0.0
Two-party-preferred result
Labor	Matt Fregon	25,106	56.2	+4.2
Liberal	Asher Judah	19,604	43.8	−4.2
Labor hold		Swing	+4.2	
