= Eddie Shaw (Australian footballer) =

Australian rules footballer, born 1903

Personal information
- Full name: Edgar Clarence Shaw
- Born: 10 July 1903; Elsternwick, Victoria
- Died: 25 May 1981 (aged 77); Burwood East, Victoria
- Original team: Elsternwick Amateurs
- Position: Wing

Playing career^{1}
Years	Club	Games (Goals)
1927	Melbourne	1 (0)
- ^{1} Playing statistics correct to the end of 1927.

Edgar Clarence Shaw (10 July 1903 – 25 May 1981) was an Australian rules footballer who played with Melbourne in the Victorian Football League (VFL).

== Family ==
The son of James Shaw (1869-1952), and Harriet Mary Ann Shaw (1875-1965), née Hanson, Edgar Clarence Shaw was born at Elsternwick, Victoria on 10 July 1903.

He married Elsa Elizabeth "Beth" Theobald at Surrey Hills, Victoria on 17 March 1934.

== Education ==
He was educated at the Elsternwick State School.

== Football ==
Shaw commenced his football career playing for the Elsternwick Football Club in the Metropolitan Amateur Football Association, where he played from 1921 until 1926.

In 1927 he was granted a permit to play with Melbourne, but he only played a single senior game, in which he was not a great success. He returned to Elsternwick by July.

== Death ==
He died at the Rosden Private Nursing Home in Burwood East, Victoria on 25 May 1981.
