= Charlie Rose (politician) =

American politician (1939–2012)

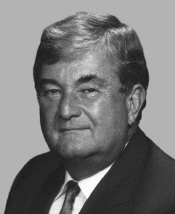

Chair of the House Administration Committee
- In office 1991–1995
- Preceded by: Frank Annunzio
- Succeeded by: Bill Thomas

Member of the U.S. House of Representatives from North Carolina's 7th district
- In office January 3, 1973 – January 3, 1997
- Preceded by: Alton Asa Lennon
- Succeeded by: Mike McIntyre

Personal details
- Born: Charles Grandison Rose III; August 10, 1939 Fayetteville, North Carolina, U.S.
- Died: September 3, 2012 (aged 73) Albertville, Alabama, U.S.
- Party: Democratic
- Spouses: Sara Richardson (m. 1962; div. 1982) Joan Teague (m. 1982; div. 1995) Stacye Hefner (m. 1995)
- Children: 4
- Education: Davidson College (LLB); University of North Carolina at Chapel Hill (JD)
- Charlie Rose's voice Rose speaks on funding for congressional committees Recorded March 30, 1993

Charles Grandison Rose III (August 10, 1939 – September 3, 2012) was an American attorney and politician who served as a member of the United States House of Representatives for North Carolina's 7th congressional district from 1973 to 1997.

== Early life and education ==
Rose was born in Fayetteville, North Carolina. He earned a Bachelor of Laws from Davidson College and a Juris Doctor from the University of North Carolina at Chapel Hill. As an undergraduate, he was a photographer for The News and Observer.

== Career ==
For several years, Rose practiced as a lawyer, and in 1967, he became a prosecutor for Fayetteville district courts. In 1970, Rose unsuccessfully challenged incumbent Congressman Alton Lennon in the Democratic primary, claiming over 40% of the vote.

=== Congress ===
In 1972, when Lennon stepped down, Rose beat back a primary bid by a Lennon-endorsed candidate, State Senator Hector McGeachy, claiming the nomination and ultimate victory.

Rose represented a district stretching from Fayetteville to Wilmington on the coast. Rose was a liberal, populist Democrat, which seemingly made him an odd fit for his conservative coastal district. However, he remained popular because he was viewed as a champion of farmers, especially tobacco farmers.

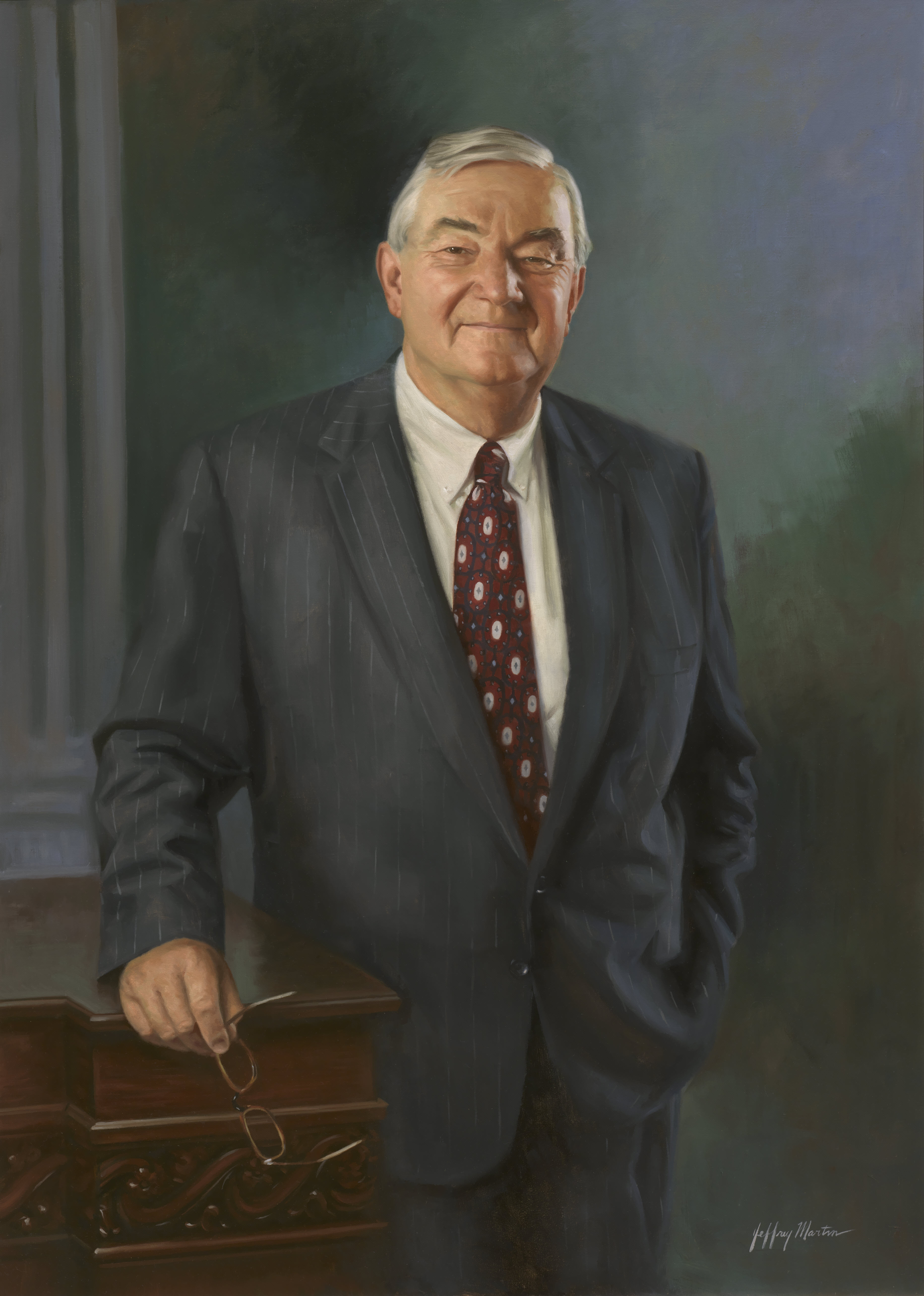
Official House portrait of Rose

He was a member of the Intelligence and Agriculture Committees. He also served as chairman of the United States House Committee on House Administration from 1991 to 1994, a post which helped earn him the nickname "mayor of the Capitol".

From his early photography days he had had an interest in cutting-edge technology and, according to friend and former chief of staff John Merritt (public servant), "pushed the House of Representatives to televise its activities on C-SPAN, helped bring computers and fiber optics to Congress and was 'behind just about every tech advancement Congress made while he was there'". He also had an electric car in the 1970s.

In 1991, Rose chaired the House Committee investigation of the George H. W. Bush administration's role in selling military supplies to Iraq.

After Democrats lost control of Congress in the 1994 Republican Revolution, Rose challenged incumbent House Democratic Leader Dick Gephardt for the post of minority leader, but lost 150–50.

=== Career after Congress ===
He retired from the House the next year and became a lobbyist, working alongside his third wife, Stacye, the daughter of fellow North Carolina Congressman Bill Hefner. Rose's former intern Mike McIntyre succeeded Rose in 1997, and held the seat until the 2014 election.

== Personal life ==
Rose married Sara Louise Richardson on June 30, 1962; they had three children. Charles Grandison Rose, IV born December 14, 1965. Louise Rose (Pacini), born October 19, 1973. Irene Cowan Rose, born November 9, 1975. Irene died in infancy of a congenital heart defect on January 28, 1976. Sara and Charlie divorced in September 1982. Rose then married Joan Ray Teague in 1982 on Bald Head Island, North Carolina. Together they adopted a baby girl, Kelly Josephine (born October 1, 1987). The couple divorced in 1995. Rose then married Stacye Hugh Hefner in May 1995 near Washington, D.C. The couple have one daughter, Parker Delaney (born October 19, 1999).

=== Death ===
In 2009, Rose moved to Albertville, Alabama, to be near Stacye's mother. Rose largely gave up his lobbying work with the move. Rose died of complications related to Parkinson's disease at a hospital in northern Alabama near their home.
