= FHC =

FHC may refer to:

== Education ==
- Father Henry Carr Catholic Secondary School, in Etobicoke, Ontario, Canada
- Flat Hat Club, an American fraternity
- Forest Hill College, in Australia
- Forest Hills Central High School, in Grand Rapids, Michigan, United States
- Francis Howell Central High School, in St. Charles, Missouri, United States

== Other uses ==
- Family History Center (LDS Church), a branch of the Family History Library of the Church of Jesus Christ of Latter-day Saints
- Fernando Henrique Cardoso (born 1931), 34th President of Brazil from 1995 to 2003
- Field Hockey Canada, a sports organization
- Financial holding company, a bank holding company or company which owns several finance-industry companies
- Fitz-Hugh–Curtis syndrome, a complication of pelvic inflammatory disease
- Fixed-head coupé, an automobile form
- Flying Heritage Collection, an American aviation museum
- Free Hugs Campaign, a social movement
- Frölunda HC, a Swedish ice hockey club
- Ferritin heavy chain (FTH1), an enzyme
- Fremont Hotel and Casino, in Las Vegas
