= Electoral district of Ashwood =

Electoral district of the Victorian Legislative Assembly in Australia

Ashwood Victoria—Legislative Assembly
- Interactive map of electoral district boundaries from the 2022 state election
- State: Victoria
- Created: 2022
- MP: Matt Fregon
- Party: Labor
- Namesake: Suburb of Ashwood
- Electors: 51,209 (2022)
- Area: 29.44 km^{2} (11.4 sq mi)
- Demographic: Urban
Electorates around Ashwood:
Hawthorn	Box Hill	Glen Waverley
Malvern	Ashwood	Glen Waverley
Malvern	Oakleigh	Mulgrave

The electoral district of Ashwood is an electorate of the Victorian Legislative Assembly in Melbourne, Australia. It was created in the redistribution of electoral boundaries in 2021, and came into effect at the 2022 Victorian state election.

Ashwood covers areas of the abolished districts of Burwood and Mount Waverley with its boundaries being Burke Road to the west, the Monash Freeway to the south, Burwood Highway and Toorak Road to the north, and Blackburn Road to the east. The seat contains the suburbs of Ashburton, Ashwood, Chadstone, Glen Iris, Mount Waverley, and parts of Burwood, Burwood East, and Camberwell.

The abolished seats of Burwood and Mount Waverley were held by Labor MPs Will Fowles and Matt Fregon respectively.

== Members for Ashwood ==
Image	Member	Party	Term	Notes
	Matt Fregon	Labor	26 November 2022 – present	Previously member for Mount Waverley. Incumbent

== Election results ==
2022 Victorian state election: Ashwood
Party	Candidate	Votes	%	±%
Labor	Matt Fregon	18,014	40.3	−0.1
Liberal	Asher Judah	16,618	37.2	−7.1
Greens	Peter Morgan	6,612	14.8	+2.7
Animal Justice	Milton Griffiths	880	2.0	+0.5
Family First	Keith Geyer	847	1.9	+1.9
Independent	Lynnette Saloumi	704	1.6	+1.6
Freedom	Norman F. Baker	568	1.3	+1.3
Independent	Michael Doyle	467	1.0	+1.0
Total formal votes		44,710	96.6	+0.7
Informal votes		1,565	3.4	−0.7
Turnout		46,275	90.4	–0.0
Two-party-preferred result
Labor	Matt Fregon	25,106	56.2	+4.2
Liberal	Asher Judah	19,604	43.8	−4.2
Labor hold		Swing	+4.2	

== See also ==
- Parliaments of the Australian states and territories
- List of members of the Victorian Legislative Assembly
