= Ross Smith (politician) =

Australian politician (1938–2023)

Ernest Ross Smith (24 January 1938 – 22 June 2023) was an Australian politician. He was the Liberal member for Glen Waverley in the Victorian Legislative Assembly from 1985 to 2002.

== Personal life ==
Smith was born on 24 January 1938, in Southport, Queensland, to Allen and Leila Smith. He attended Fort Street Boys' High School and Balmain Teachers' College (both in Sydney) from which he graduated in 1956. Ross married Sarah (Craig) Spencer on 12 December 1987. Sarah Spencer is English and had two sons prior to their marriage, and one son together.

== Professional life ==
Ross taught at Tarcutta Primary School and Albury High School, both in New South Wales, from 1957 to 1959 before working at the Immigration Department at Australia House in London in 1960. In 1961, he became a journalist, writing for the Daily Telegraph and the Sydney Sun. In 1964, he enlisted in the army and served two tours of duty in Vietnam. He later rose to the rank of lieutenant colonel. In 1964, he also joined the Liberal Party.

Smith left the army in 1984, and in 1985 was elected to the Victorian Legislative Assembly as the Liberal member for the new seat of Glen Waverley. He became Government Whip in 1996, and Opposition Whip in 1999 when the Coalition lost government. He retired in 2002, when his seat was abolished.

Parliament of Victoria
Preceded by New seat	Member for Glen Waverley; 1985–2002	Succeeded by Seat abolished
