= Michael Gidley =

Australian politician

Michael Gidley MP
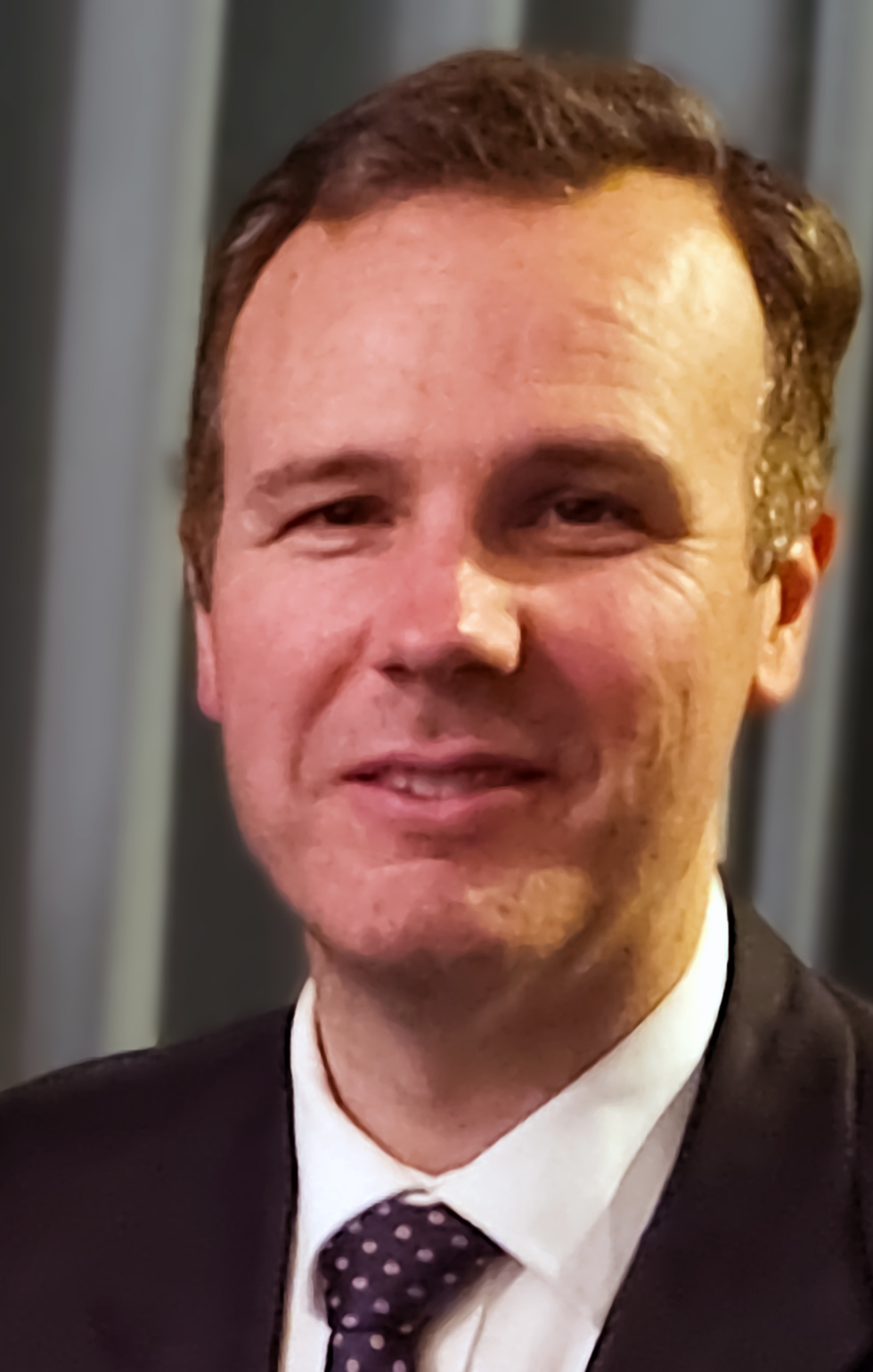

Member of the Victorian Parliament for Mount Waverley
- In office 2 December 2010 – 24 November 2018
- Preceded by: Maxine Morand
- Succeeded by: Matt Fregon

Personal details
- Born: 11 October 1976 (age 50)
- Party: Liberal Party

Michael Xavier Charles Gidley (born 11 October 1976) is an Australian politician, and was the Liberal member for Mount Waverley in the Victorian Legislative Assembly from 2010 to 2018.

== Career ==
Gidley is an accountant and former Young Liberals president. He ran for Mount Waverley at the 2006 election, and also contested the safe Labor seat of Thomastown at the 1999 election.

Gidley is anti-abortion. In October 2014 he took part in the March for the Babies alongside Jan Kronberg. in 2015 Gidley voted against banning anti abortion protesters from protesting outside abortion clinics. Gidley is a supporter of the Monarchy.

Prior to gaining his party's nomination for the seat of Mount Waverley, Gidley had nominated for Liberal MP Kim Wells' seat of Scoresby.

Gidley opposed legalizing euthanasia. Gidley lost his seat in the 2018 Victorian election and subsequently went on to join an Internet gambling firm.

Gidley in 2014 was denounced by Former Victorian Premier Ted Baillieu in a leaked recording.

== Personal life ==
Gidley was educated at Xavier College and he is married and has three children.

Victorian Legislative Assembly
Preceded by Maxine Morand	Member for Mount Waverley; 2010–2018	Succeeded by Matt Fregon
