= Kirstie Marshall =

Australian skier and politician

Kirstie Claire Marshall OAM MP

Member of the Victorian Legislative Assembly for Forest Hill
- In office 30 November 2002 – 27 November 2010
- Preceded by: John Richardson
- Succeeded by: Neil Angus

Personal details
- Born: Kirstie Claire Marshall; 21 April 1969 (age 57) Melbourne, Victoria, Australia
- Party: Labor Party
- Children: 2
- Occupation: Olympic skier
- Sports career
Medal record
Women's freestyle skiing
Representing Australia
FIS Freestyle World Ski Championships
Gold medal – first place	1997 Iizuna Kogen	Aerials
Bronze medal – third place	1995 La Clusaz	Aerials

Kirstie Claire Marshall (born 21 April 1969) is an Australian aerial skier and Victorian state politician.

Marshall was an ex-gymnast who became an aerial skier at Mount Buller, Victoria. During her skiing career Marshall won over 40 World Cup medals, including 17 World Cup gold medals. Marshall competed in aerial skiing as a demonstration sport at the 1992 Albertville Winter Olympics, and as a medal event at the 1994 Lillehammer and 1998 Nagano games, where she came sixth and fourteenth, respectively.

In December 2002, aged 33, Marshall was elected as a Member of Parliament in the Victorian Legislative Assembly for the Labor Party.

On 26 February 2003, she was ejected from the Lower House chamber for breastfeeding her 11-day-old baby, Charlotte Louise. A section of the Parliamentary rules, namely Standing Order 30, states: "Unless by order of the House, no Member of this House shall presume to bring any stranger into any part of the House appropriated to the Members of this House while the House, or a Committee of the whole House, is sitting." As there is no age limit to 'strangers in the House' (non-elected persons), only MPs and certain parliamentary staff are allowed in the House during sitting times.

Subsequently, the Speaker of the House set aside a room in which female MPs can feed their children without violating the Standing Orders.

== Early life and sporting career ==
Marshall was born in Melbourne on 21 April 1969 and grew up in the Melbourne suburb of Black Rock with parents, Ron and Anne, older sister, Sascha and younger brother, Carey. She attended Black Rock Primary school (Prep - Yr 6), then Mentone Girls High School (now Mentone Secondary College) before transferring to Firbank Girls' Grammar School in Yr 9. She moved to Taylors College for year 12.

Marshall, along with her siblings, started skiing from the age of 4 at the Mount Baw Baw ski resort in Victoria, Australia. In 1981 the family became regular skiers at the Mount Buller ski resort, one of the largest ski resorts in Victoria. In 1987 she joined Team Buller, a Freestyle ski team run by Geoff Lipshut, Peter Braun, Eyal Talmore, Tim Skate and David Freedman based on Mount Buller.

The creation of a skier-exchange program for Freestyle Aerialists saw three Japanese skiers spend the 1987 winter in Mount Buller one of whom, Takayo Yokoyama, was nearing the end of his career and was interested in becoming an International coach. With little prospects in his native country, the chance meeting in Australia saw Marshall being offered a four-month scholarship in Inawashiro, Listel Ski Fantasia, the centre for Freestyle Skiing in Japan, with Takayo as her coach.

Following the 1988 Australian Freestyle competition where she placed first, Marshall decided to follow the European winter and compete on the four-month World Cup Season. Sponsored by a Melbourne-based travel company, she headed overseas as the only Australian representative in either Aerials, Moguls or Ballet (Acrobatics).

While not truly competitive with her single back layout and single front tuck, she completed her rookie season finishing in 10th position, at that time one of the highest placing by an Australian winter athlete, male or female, in any winter sport other than Lyn Gross (La Clusaz World Cup Aerials). Malcolm Milne (World Cup Downhill) Steve Lee (World Cup Downhill) Zali Steggall (World Cup Slalom). In 1990 Marshall won her first World Cup event. In 1992, she was crowned World Champion, with six World Cup victories, and competed in aerial skiing as a demonstration sport at the 1992 Albertville Winter Olympics. She was Australia's flag bearer at the 1994 Lillehammer Winter Olympics, where she was placed sixth in the women's aerial skiing event – the nation's best Olympic result at the time. She also competed in the 1998 Nagano Winter Olympics. Marshall set several world records over the course of her skiing career, including becoming the first woman in history to score over 100 points on a single competition jump, with a score of 104.37. Her 17th career World Cup gold medal in 1998 tied her for the all-time record for career World Cup aerial victories with Canadian skier Marie Claude Asselin, who retired in 1984. She has been a board member of the Olympic Winter Institute of Australia since her retirement from skiing.

Marshall discovered current Australian aerial skier, David Morris, while attending a gymnastics display at his local club, which is within her electorate of Forest Hill.

== Political career ==
On 3 September 2002, Victorian State Premier Steve Bracks announced that Marshall had been nominated for preselection as a Labor candidate in the Victorian state seat of Forest Hill. In the election that followed, she won the seat of Forest Hill with a swing of more than 10%.

On 27 February 2003, twelve days after giving birth to her first child, daughter Charlotte Louise, Marshall attended the first sitting of parliament following the 2002 election. When official proceedings commenced whilst she was still breastfeeding her newborn, the Speaker of the House ejected Charlotte (and therefore her mother) from the chamber as "only MPs and certain parliamentary staff are allowed in the House during sitting times". The controversy that followed was headline news and led to widespread debate in the community regarding the merits of women breastfeeding in public or at workplaces.

Marshall was re-elected for the seat of Forest Hill in the 2006 state election. She lost her seat in 2010, with local residents citing her choice to live in Richmond rather than the electorate and media reportage of avoiding interviews as key reasons. A statement issued by her office on election day stated "Kirstie will not be doing any interviews today or tonight. She will not be having any (photo) shots done during the day or at her function tonight."

== Honours ==
Marshall received an Australian Sports Medal in 2000 and a Medal of the Order of Australia in 2003. She was inducted into the Sport Australia Hall of Fame in 2010.

Victorian Legislative Assembly
Preceded by John Richardson	Member for Forest Hill; 2002–2010	Succeeded by Neil Angus
