= Electoral district of Forest Hill =

State electoral district of Victoria, Australia

Forest Hill Victoria—Legislative Assembly
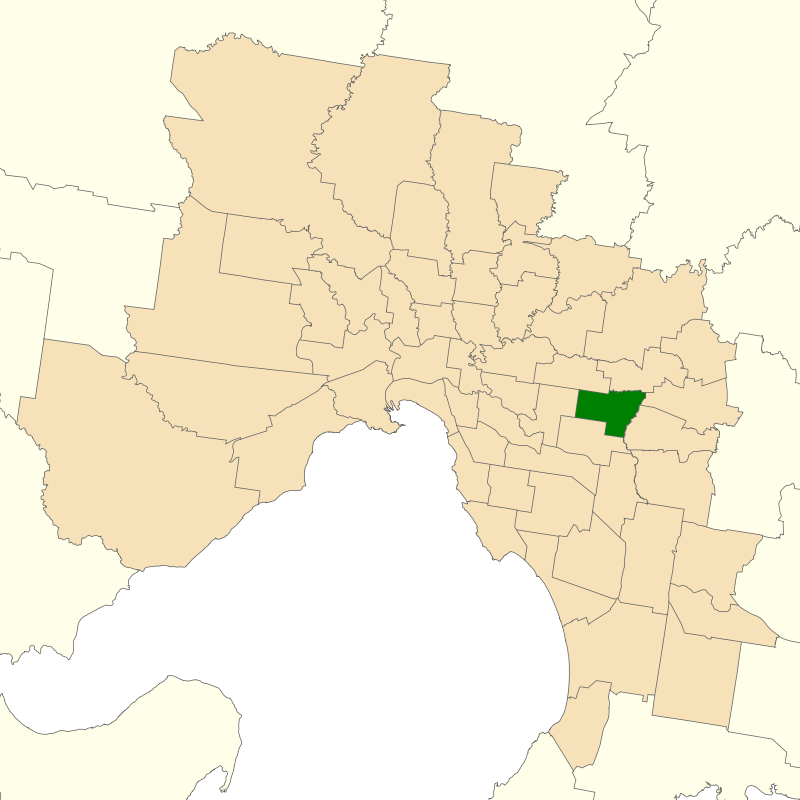
- Location of Forest Hill (dark green) in Greater Melbourne
- State: Victoria
- Created: 1976
- Abolished: 2022
- MP: Neil Angus
- Party: Liberal Party
- Electors: 39,830 (2018)
- Area: 25 km^{2} (9.7 sq mi)
- Demographic: Outer metropolitan

Forest Hill was an electoral district of the Legislative Assembly in the Australian state of Victoria. It was a 25 km^{2} electorate located in the eastern suburbs of Melbourne, encompassing the suburbs of Blackburn South, Burwood East and Vermont South and parts of Forest Hill and Vermont. The electorate had a population of 50,163 as of the 2006 census.

Forest Hill was created as a relatively safe Liberal seat in 1976, and was won by Liberal candidate John Richardson at the election that year. Richardson was re-elected at six consecutive elections, surviving some close races against Labor candidates at the height of the Cain government in the 1980s, and held the seat with a comfortable margin of over 7% when he retired at the 2002 election. However, Labor nominated high-profile skier and Winter Olympics medallist Kirstie Marshall as their candidate at that election, which combined with a statewide Labor landslide and the loss of Richardson's personal vote saw Labor easily win the seat for the first time. Marshall suffered a sharp swing back to the Liberal Party at the 2006 election, and held the seat by a margin of only 0.78%. At the 2010 election, Marshall was defeated by Liberal candidate Neil Angus, who then held onto the seat for the remainder of its existence.

The seat was abolished by the Electoral Boundaries Commission ahead of the 2022 election and largely replaced by the electoral district of Glen Waverley.

== Members for Forest Hill ==
Member	Party	Term
John Richardson	Liberal	1976–2002
Kirstie Marshall	Labor	2002–2010
Neil Angus	Liberal	2010–2022

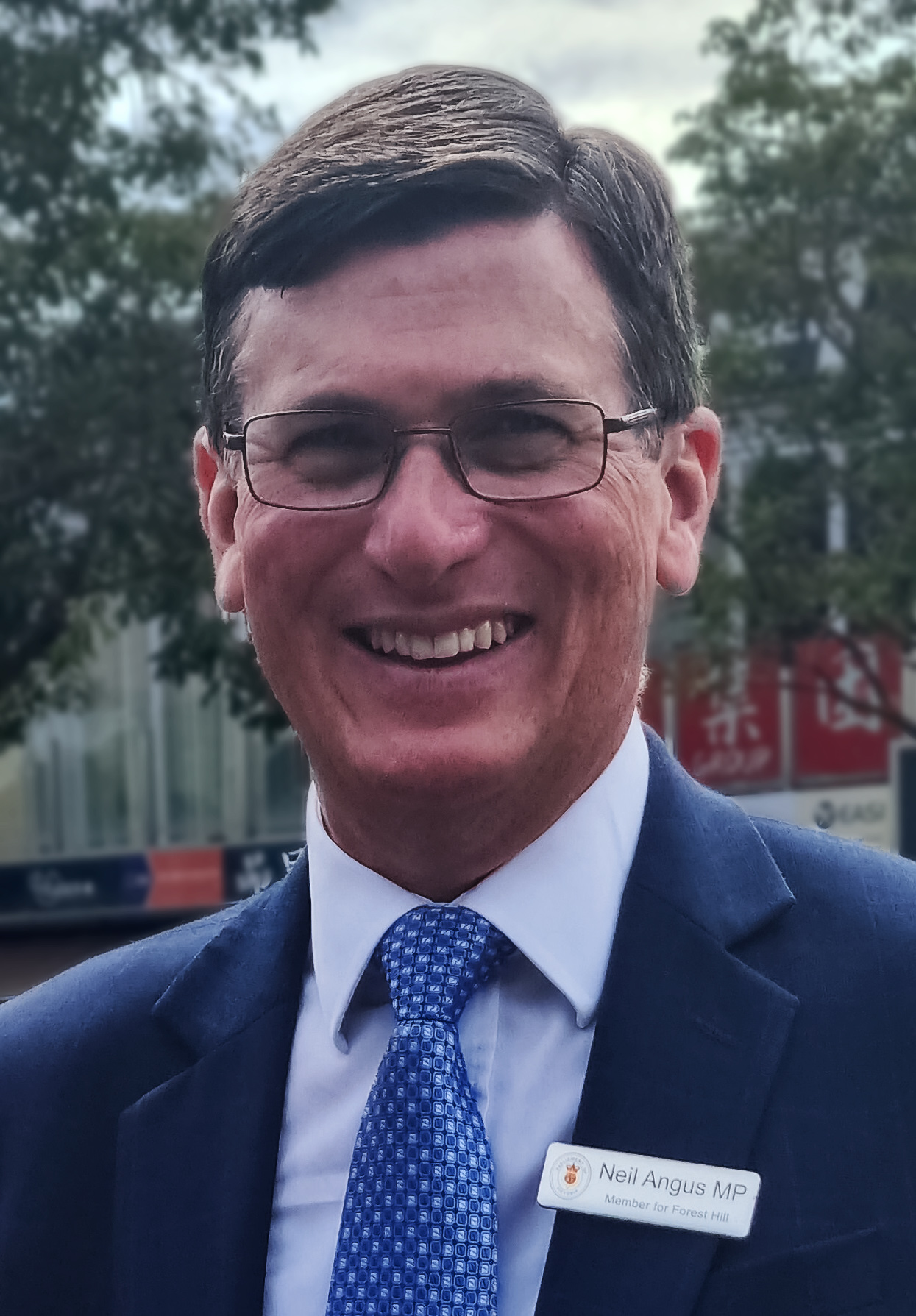
Last member for Forest Hill Neil Angus

== Election results ==
2018 Victorian state election: Forest Hill
Party	Candidate	Votes	%	±%
Liberal	Neil Angus	16,970	48.61	−1.11
Labor	Manoj Kumar	14,164	40.57	+5.37
Greens	Naresh Bhalla	3,083	8.83	−0.08
Independent	Claude Bai	696	1.99	+1.99
Total formal votes		34,913	95.44	−0.29
Informal votes		1,670	4.57	+0.29
Turnout		36,583	91.85	−2.17
Two-party-preferred result
Liberal	Neil Angus	17,858	51.15	−3.67
Labor	Manoj Kumar	17,055	48.85	+3.67
Liberal hold		Swing	−3.67	
