= Forest Hill College =

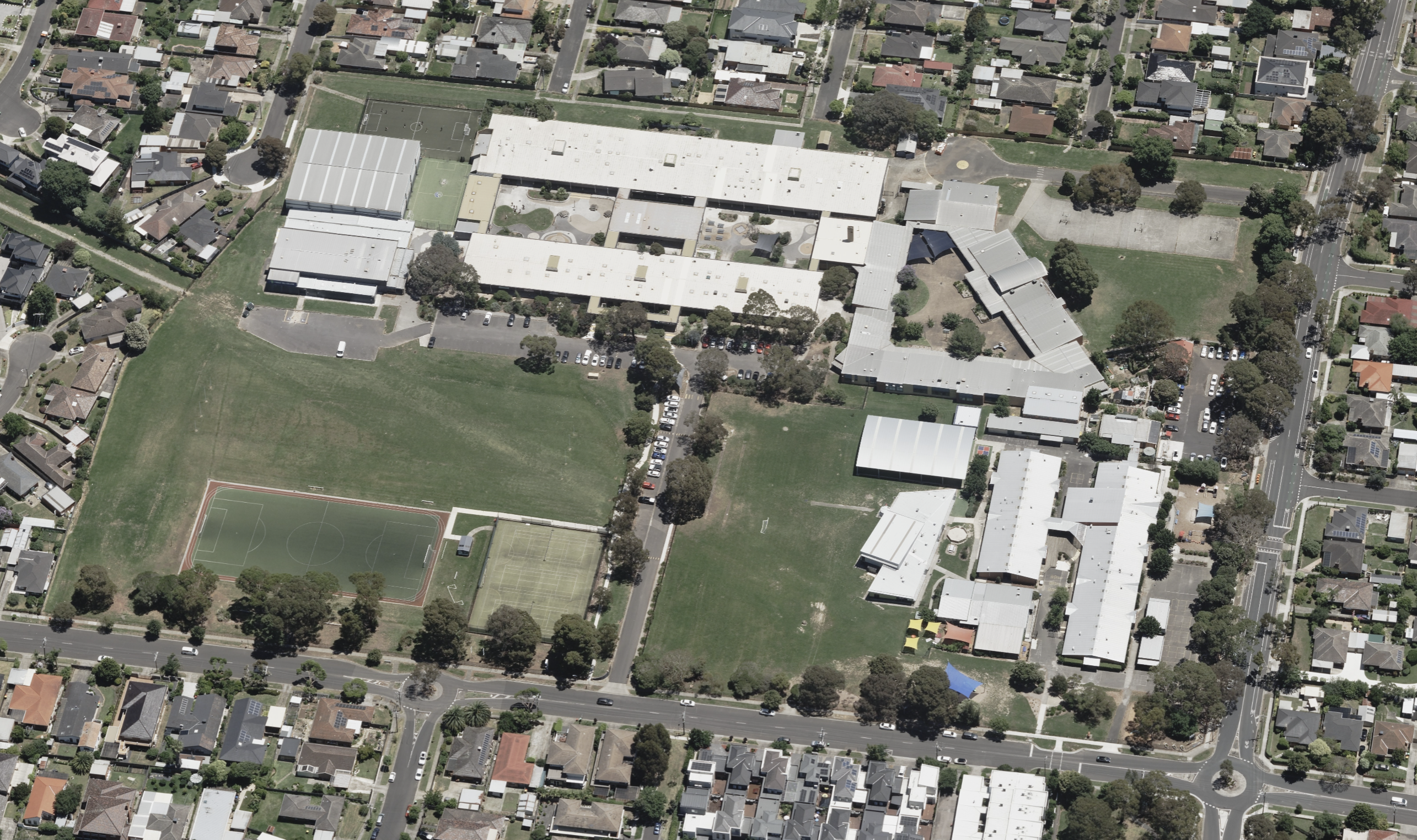

Location
- 178–180 Mahoneys Road; Burwood East, Victoria 3131; Australia; 37.8485°S 145.1620°E

Information
- Former name: Burwood Heights (1969–1990)
- Type: Public
- Motto: Connect, Explore, Aspire
- Established: 1990
- School number: 8724
- Principal: Nicky Buckingham (Acting Principal) Jesse Blowers (Acting Vice) David Rogers (Former 2007–2024)
- Teaching staff: 45
- Years offered: 7–12
- Gender: Co-educational
- Enrolment: 377 (2026) 602 (2019); 750 (2006); 504 (1974)
- Colours: Navy blue, green, white
- Website: www.fhc.vic.edu.au

Forest Hill College is a co-educational state secondary college in Burwood East, Victoria, Australia. It was originally established in 1970 as Burwood Heights Secondary College, later re-opening as Forest Hill College in 1990.

== History ==
=== Planning ===
The 1954 Melbourne & Metropolitan Planning Scheme rezoned a large section of land in then-rural Burwood East, paving the way for residential development. During the post-war housing boom, thousands of new residents settled in the area.

In response to the area's increasing population, the State Government acquired part of an old orchard at Mahoneys Road to establish public education facilities. Burwood Heights Primary School opened in 1965, followed by Burwood Heights High School (now Forest Hill College) in 1969.

=== Opening and early years ===
Principal Miss J.R. McLennan and a staff of three opened Burwood Heights High School on 3 February 1970. The initial class of 28 Year 7 students were temporarily taught at Glen Waverley Primary School, moving into the permanent campus on 8 June 1970.The manual arts block, boiler room and locker bays were built a few months later.

By April 1974, enrolments had reached 504 students. However, due to a planning oversight, the general classroom and administrative buildings were still incomplete—only the foundations had been laid. As an interim measure, additional portables were installed until the permanent structures were finished. The campus was completed by 1975, with landscaping designed by Public Works Department architect J. J. Weston.

=== Reopening as Forest Hill College ===
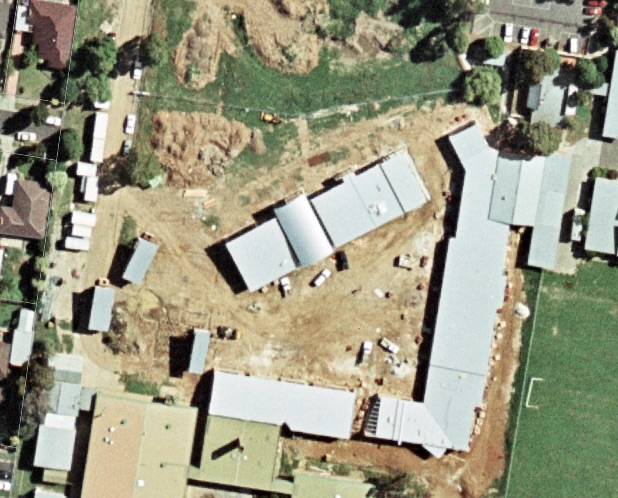
Under construction, 1996

In 1990, Burwood Heights merged with Nunawading High and Blackburn South High to become Forest Hill (Secondary) College. The Nunawading and Blackburn South schools were designated as junior campuses, and Burwood Heights became the senior campus. This configuration continued until the junior campuses closed by 1997 and its students were moved to the recently expanded Mahoneys Road (ex-Burwood Heights) campus; where the school remains today. This was officially opened by John Richardson on 20 October 1996.

Up until 2010, Forest Hill College was divided into 2 sub-schools, Junior (Year 7-9), and Senior (Year 10-12), with a courtyard for Year 7–9, a courtyard for Year 10, and another courtyard for VCE Year 11–12.

== Upgrades ==
In 2022, Forest Hill College received $10.9 million in funding from the state government to upgrade key areas of the school, including the Science, Arts, IT, and Food Technology facilities, as well as the canteen and toilet blocks. Construction began in 2024 and was successfully completed in January 2026, marking a major improvement to the school’s learning environment and overall facilities.

The refurbishment project focused on Blocks A, B, D, and M, delivering significant upgrades across each space. Blocks A and B were transformed with the addition of four state-of-the-art science laboratories and two modern food technology classrooms, all designed to support hands-on, practical learning with updated equipment and improved layouts. These spaces now provide students with a more advanced and engaging environment for both science and food studies. Block D was also fully upgraded and now includes a refurbished canteen along with modernised and more accessible toilet facilities, improving both comfort and functionality for students.

Block M was originally planned to open alongside the other refurbished buildings and was designed to include four light-filled art and craft rooms, as well as an outdoor art deck to encourage creativity and outdoor learning. However, due to unexpected construction issues, the building had to be demolished before completion. As a result, the original plans for Block M were abandoned, and the future use of the site remains undecided.

Looking ahead, the school also has future plans to continue improving its facilities, with refurbishments to Blocks K and L already being considered as part of the next stage of development.

== Major Developments ==
Over the years, the College has undergone a number of major building and refurbishment projects. Previous developments include:

Southern and Middle Court Yard Refurbishment and Landscaping - 2019 - 2020

Barak Centre Refurbishment - 2018

STEAM Centre Refurbishment - 2017

Administration Building Refurbishment - 2014

Middle Years Building Refurbishment - 2013

Science Building Refurbishment - 2013

Construction of Soccer Field and Tennis Courts - 2010

== Specialist programs ==
Deaf Facility International Student Program STEAM (Science, Technology, Engineering, Arts and Mathematics)

== VCE Subjects Offered ==
Performing / Visual Arts - Media - Visual Communication & Design - Music

Mathematics - General Mathematics - Mathematical Methods - Specialist Mathematics

Design Technologies - Food Studies

English - English - English (EAL) - English (Language) - Literature

Science - Biology - Chemistry - Physics - Psychology

Business & Economics - Accounting - Business Management - Legal Studies

VCE Vocational Major - VCE VM Literacy - VCE VM Numeracy - VCE VM Work Related Skills - VCE VM Personal Development Skills

== Student Life ==
Year 12 Cup Forest Hill College runs the Year 12 Cup, an annual competition where Year 12 students compete against teachers in a range of sporting and recreational activities. One activity is held each month throughout the school year, with points awarded based on the results of each event. At the end of the year, the team with the most points is awarded the Year 12 Cup. The competition provides an opportunity for students and staff to interact outside the classroom and is a popular activity within the College community.

Formal Club The Formal Club is a student group responsible for helping plan and organise the annual Year 11 and Year 12 formal. Students involved in the club work together to contribute ideas and assist with decisions regarding the event, including its theme, decorations and activities.

Year 12 Video Each year, a team of Year 12 students comes together to create the annual Year 12 video. Students contribute by sharing ideas, planning scenes, filming, editing and participating in the video. The completed video is shown at the Year 12 graduation assembly and provides a fun opportunity for students to celebrate their final year at the College and look back on their time together.

== Wellbeing ==
Forest Hill College provides a range of wellbeing programs and support services for students, with wellbeing staff available to assist students with their academic, social and personal needs. The College places a particular focus on supporting students during their senior years and VCE, with initiatives including breakfast and snack programs, special food events and other activities designed to support student wellbeing throughout the school day.

The College also provides dedicated wellbeing spaces, including a wellbeing corner within the library and a wellbeing office where students can access support in a quieter environment. The wellbeing office includes facilities such as a hammock, providing students with a space to relax and take time away from the demands of the school day.

The wellbeing program also supports students in areas such as study skills, mindfulness, meditation and managing stress. Staff are available to provide guidance and support to students experiencing difficulties, while wellbeing initiatives throughout the year aim to promote positive mental health, connection and engagement within the school community.

== Houses ==
The four houses are:

- Kookaburra – Blue
- Wallaby – Yellow
- Dingo – Red
- Crocodile – Green

== Student Leadership ==
Student Leadership - Forest Hill College now runs a program called Leadership Connect, which meets once a week during an hour when other classes have homegroup. Students involved in Leadership Connect, drawn from all year levels, participate in a dedicated session to focus on school improvement and student wellbeing. During these sessions, leadership students conduct surveys, gather student suggestions, and address any issues raised within the school community. They also carry out Connect Visits, visiting homegroups to collect feedback and discuss concerns. In addition, leadership students organise and oversee key school events such as assemblies and the annual Basketball Marathon, ensuring student voices are actively represented in the life of the College.

Leos Club (Former) - The Forest Hill College Leos Club is a student-run organisation affiliated with the Lions Club Nunawading, dedicated to raising funds and supporting charitable causes. All proceeds from events are donated to charity. The club organises a wide range of activities, including bake sales, BBQs, fun runs, trivia nights, and more. The Leos Club is managed by a board of directors, which includes roles such as President, Vice President, Secretary, Treasurer, Activity Director, Fun Director, and Fundraising Director. General meetings are held every fortnight, with board meetings held as needed in between. In addition to fundraising, the club actively participates in volunteering projects, including clothing, food, and book drives, tree planting, Clean Up Australia Day, and supporting sick children. The club operates under the guidance of 2–3 teacher advisors, while remaining fully student-run.

Houses - Forest Hill College has four houses, named Kookaburra (Blue), Dingo (Red), Wallaby (Yellow), and Crocodile (Green). Each tribe has a designated House Captain or leader responsible for guiding their members and overseeing various activities.

== Academies ==
Academies at Forest Hill College conduct training sessions every morning from approximately 9:00 to 10:00. In addition to sports, Forest Hill College is among the first schools to offer a 21st-century STEAM Academy, providing students with opportunities in Science, Technology, Engineering, Arts, and Mathematics.

STEAM

Performing Arts

Soccer

Australian Rules Football (Former)

Basketball (Former)

Netball (Former)

Tennis (Former)

Golf (Former)

== Historical images ==
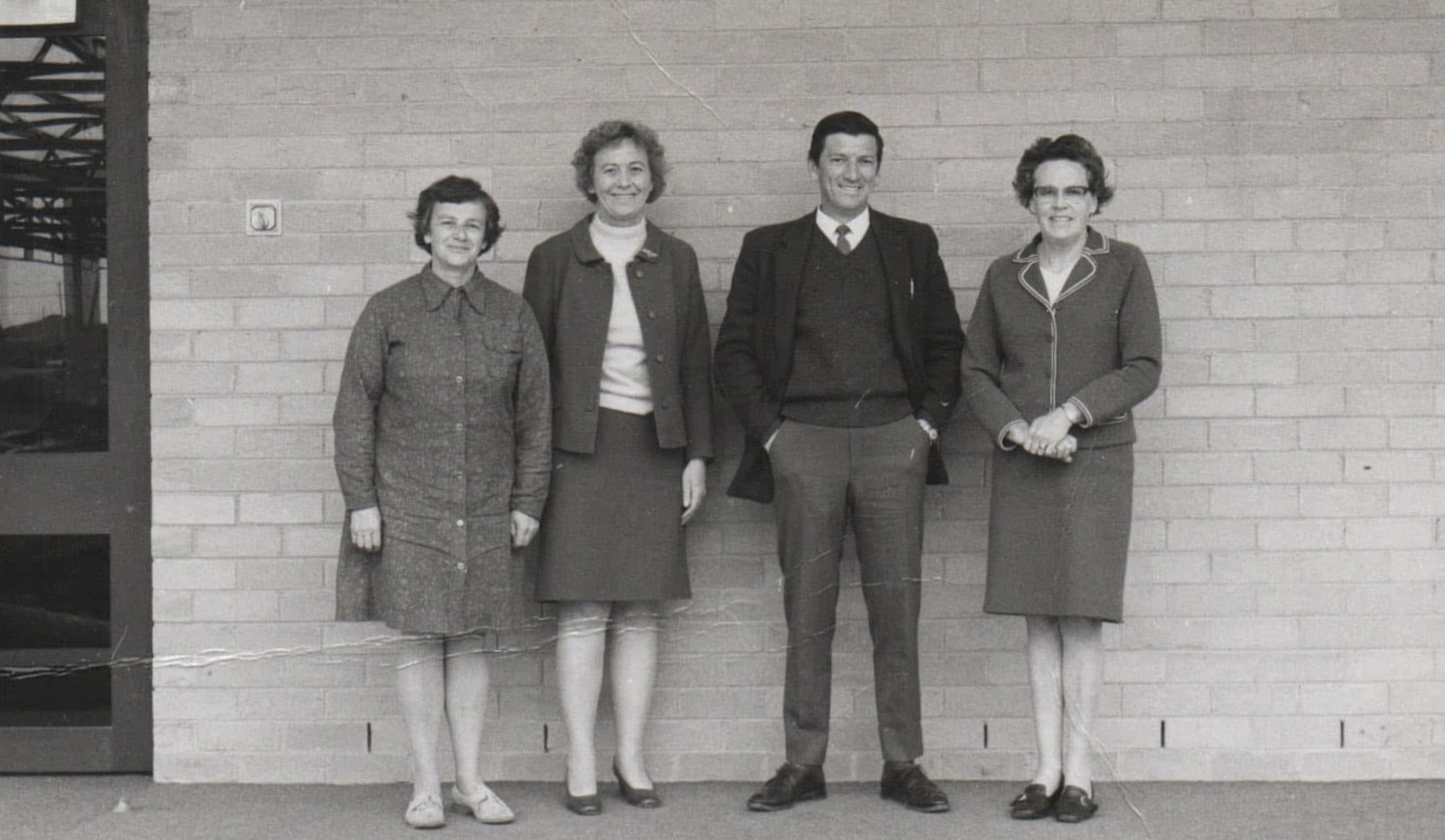
First staff (1970)

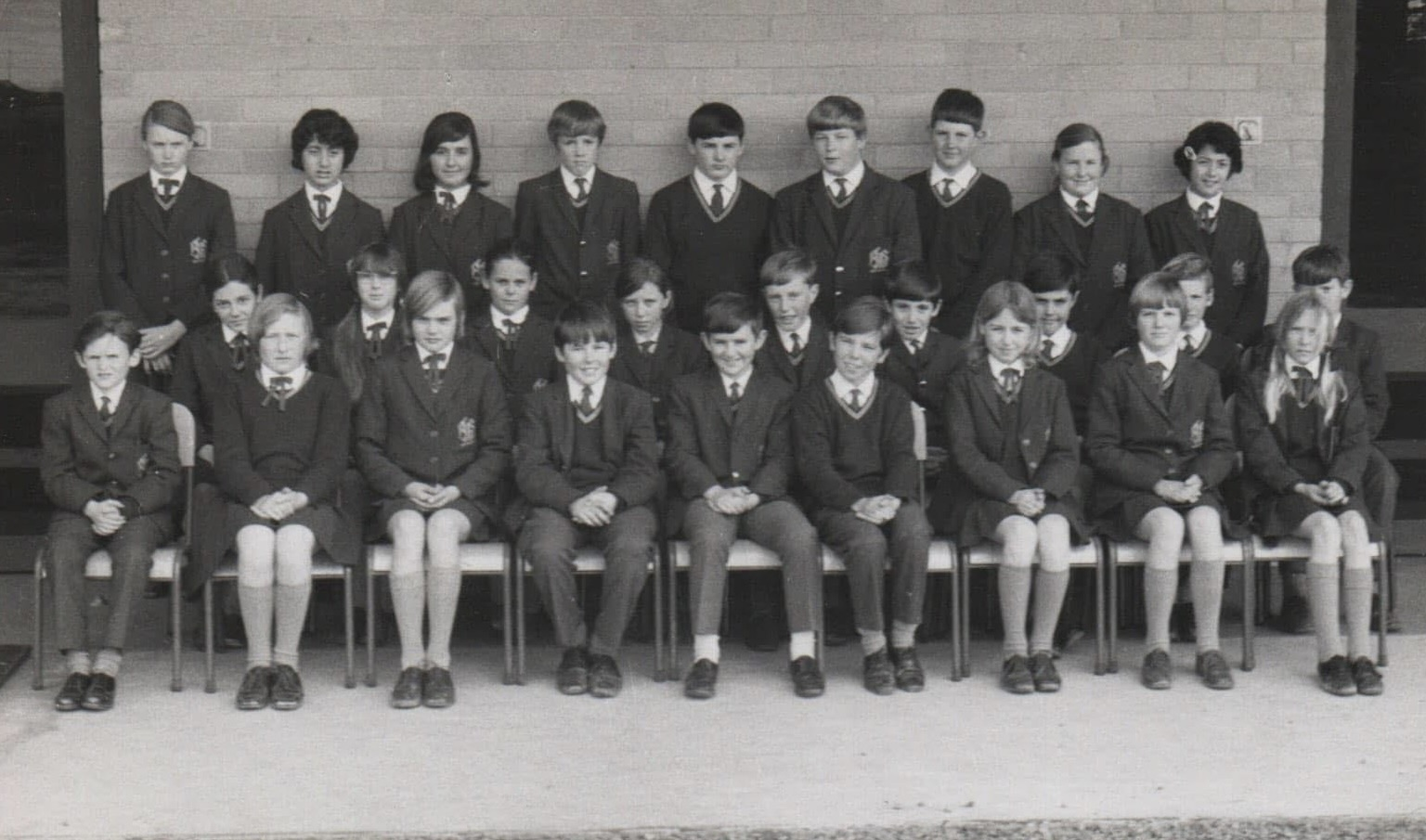
First students (1970)

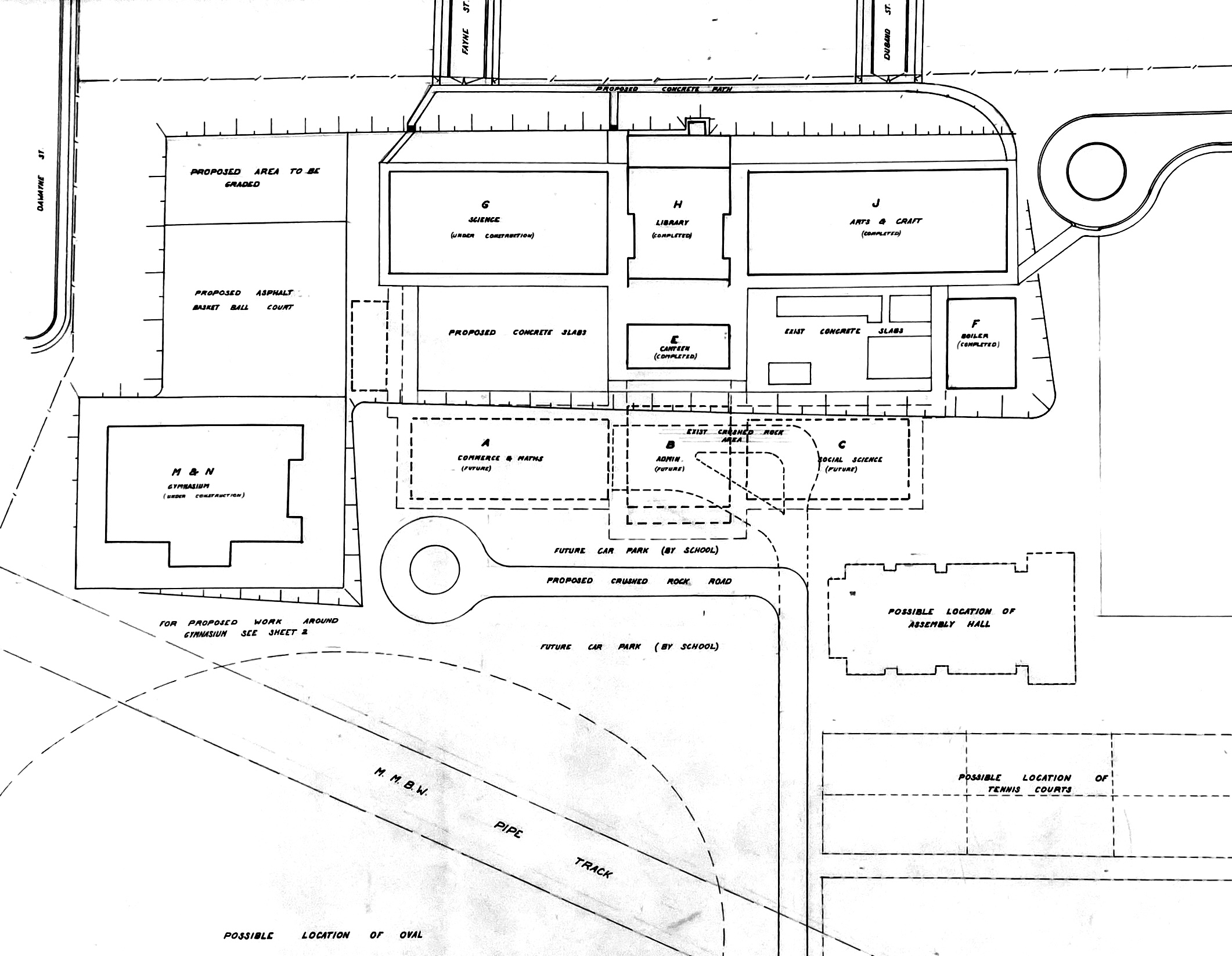
Development plan (1969)

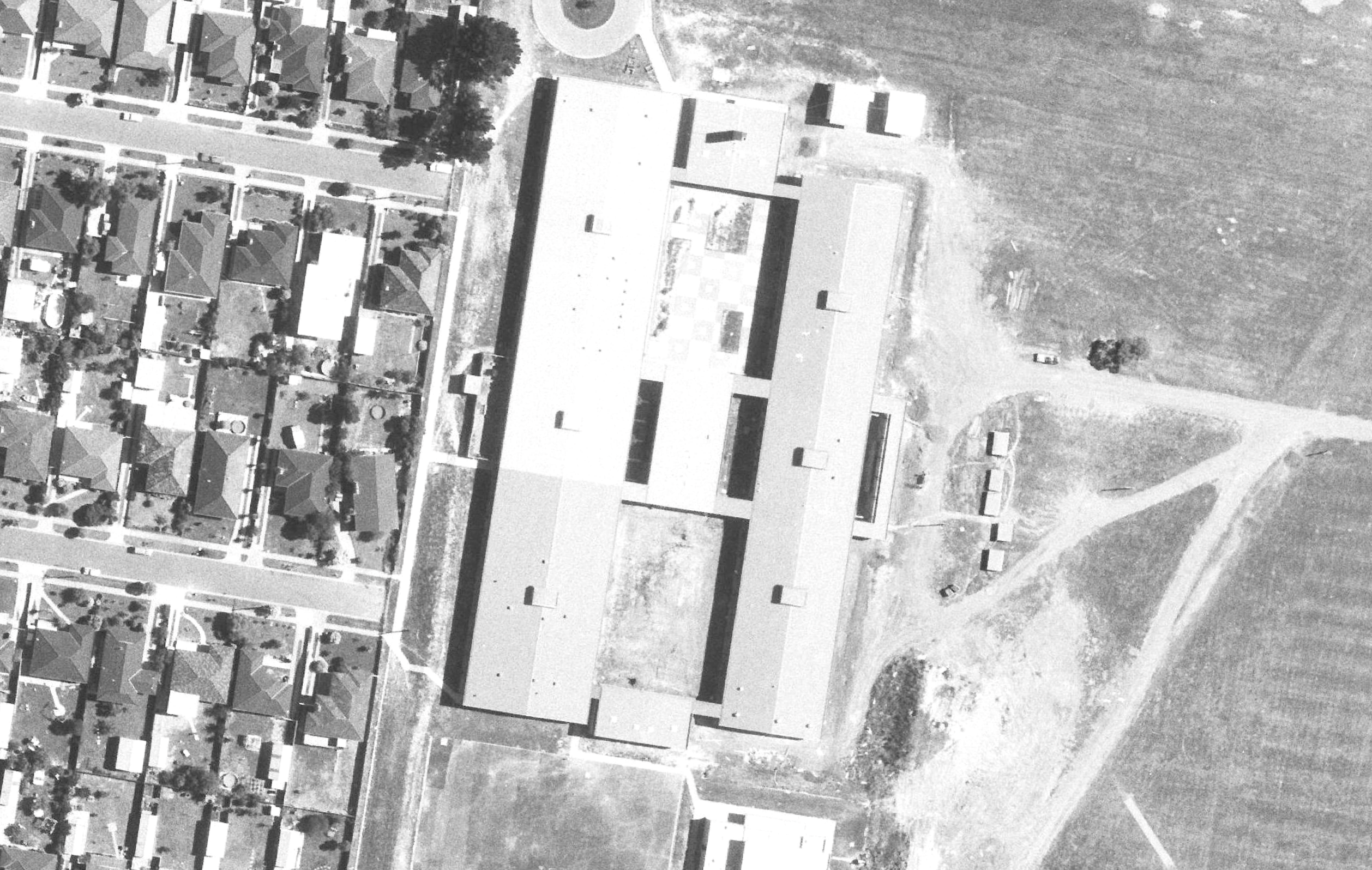
Aerial view (1975)

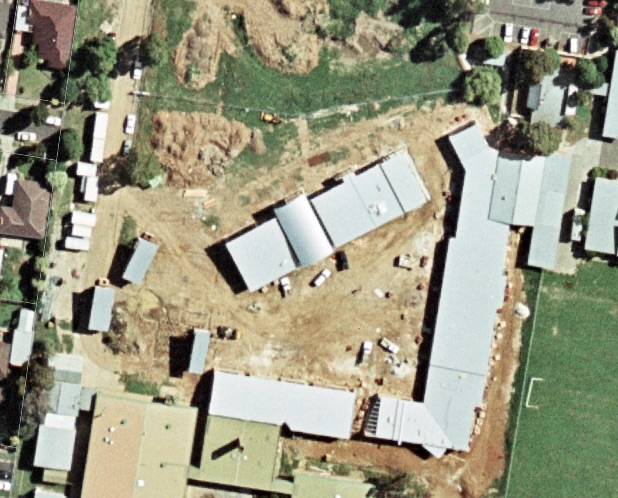
Aerial view (1996)
