= Maxine Morand =

Australian politician

Maxine Morand AM

Member of the Victorian Parliament for Mount Waverley
- In office 30 November 2002 – 27 November 2010
- Preceded by: new seat
- Succeeded by: Michael Gidley

Victorian Minister for Children and Early Childhood Development
- In office July 2007 – 2 December 2010
- Preceded by: Lisa Neville
- Succeeded by: Wendy Lovell

Personal details
- Born: 30 January 1959 (age 67) Sydney, New South Wales
- Party: Labor Party
- Spouse: John Merritt
- Profession: Nurse, researcher, academic

Maxine Veronica Morand AM (born 30 January 1959) is an Australian academic, advocate for cancer patients, and former politician. Morand has a current academic appointment at Monash University where she is a professorial fellow in the School of Public Health and Preventive Medicine. In addition she is a board director at Inner East Community Health and is the chair of the Peter MacCallum Cancer Centre.

Morand served as the chief executive officer of Breast Cancer Network Australia (BCNA) between 2011 and 2014. Prior to joining BCNA, Morand was Minister for Children and Early Childhood Development and Minister for Women's Affairs in the Brumby Ministry, and held the Victorian Legislative Assembly seat of Mount Waverley. Before being elected to Parliament, she was a researcher at Cancer Council Victoria and ministerial adviser. Prior to entering politics she was a nurse and transplant coordinator.

Morand lives in Melbourne with her husband, John Merritt, and two children. Morand was diagnosed with breast cancer in 2011.

== Career ==
Morand has a background in health, research and politics. After commencing her career as a general nurse, Morand was one of the first organ transplant coordinators in Victoria. After a career break with the birth of her two children, Morand returned to university and completed her Arts degree at La Trobe University with an honours year in Sociology, majoring in statistics. This led to a research role at the Centre for Behavioural Research at the Cancer Council Victoria and work on a diverse range of projects including evaluation of the Quit program and cancer patient needs. Morand went on to become an advisor to John Thwaites, the newly elected Victorian Minister for Health and Deputy Premier, working across a range of public health policies and programs and health practitioner regulation.

In March 2020 Morand was inducted into the Victorian Honour Roll of Women.

=== Political career ===
Morand ran unsuccessfully as the Australian Labor Party (ALP) candidate for the federal electorate of Kooyong in the 1998 election, achieving a 2.4% swing towards the ALP.

She won the Liberal-held Victorian Legislative Assembly seat of Mount Waverley in the 2002 election, at the age of 43. During her time in Parliament, she served for four years on the board of the Victorian Health Promotion Foundation (VicHealth) and held a range of senior government positions including Parliamentary Secretary for Health.

On 2 August 2007, newly appointed Premier John Brumby announced a cabinet reshuffle in which Morand was elevated to the newly created portfolio of Children and Early Childhood Development. A role which included responsibilities for a wide range of servies related to maternal and child health, including early intervention services for children with disabilities. The same year, she was also appointed Minister for Women's Affairs, where she used her position to advocate for equal opportunity, prevention of violence against women, and to lead a major legislative reform focused on women's healthcare.

In 2008, Morand introduced the Abortion Law Reform Bill. The passage of the bill decriminalised abortion in Victoria up to twenty four weeks and up to the moment of birth if two doctors grant approval. As a consequence of her pro-choice advocacy she was targeted by Right to Life organisations before and during the campaign for the 2010 Victorian election. At that election, she lost her seat to the Liberal candidate, Michael Gidley.

=== Breast Cancer Network Australia ===
Maxine served as CEO of Breast Cancer Network Australia (BCNA) between 2011 and 2014. Maxine was diagnosed and treated for breast cancer in 2011, giving her personal insight into the impact and management of a cancer diagnosis.

Morand has been a member of the Peter MacCallum Cancer Centre board of directors since 2015.

Victorian Legislative Assembly
Preceded by Seat created	Member for Mount Waverley; 2002–2010	Succeeded by Michael Gidley
