= John Merritt (public servant) =

Personal details
- Born: 1959 (age 66–67)
- Spouse: Maxine Morand
- Occupation: Public servant

John Merritt (born 1959) is an Australian retired public servant from Victoria. He was appointed Chief Executive of VicRoads in May 2014 and announced in October 2017 that he would step down from the role in December 2017.

== Life and career ==
After completing a Bachelor of Economics at Monash University, John attended the London School of Economics on a British Council Scholarship conducting post graduate research. John then returned to Australia and continued his career as an Industrial Officer and Advocate where he had significant involvement in award restructuring.

Merritt was Executive Director of Health and Safety at WorkSafe Victoria from 2001 to 2009. As an Executive Director, John led a major transformation of the organisation. He also took leadership of a statewide change program about occupational health and safety which featured social marketing and award-winning media campaigns.

In April 2014, Merritt was appointed as the Chief Executive Officer of VicRoads. Merritt left VicRoads on 20 December 2017.
