= Electoral district of Glen Waverley =

State electoral district in Victoria, Australia

Glen Waverley Victoria—Legislative Assembly
- Interactive map of electoral district boundaries from the 2022 state election
- State: Victoria
- Dates current: 1985–2002; 2022–present
- MP: John Mullahy
- Party: Labor
- Namesake: Suburb of Glen Waverley
- Electors: 51,403
- Area: 36 km^{2} (13.9 sq mi)
- Demographic: Metropolitan
- Coordinates: 37°50′S 145°10′E

The electoral district of Glen Waverley is an electoral district of the Legislative Assembly in the Australian state of Victoria.

It was originally created for the 1985 Victorian state election and was abolished at the 2002 election.

At the 2021 redistribution, it was re-created following the abolition of the districts of Forest Hill and Mount Waverley, covering eastern Melbourne suburbs.

It contains the suburbs of Glen Waverley, Vermont South, most of Forest Hill and Vermont, and parts of Blackburn South, Burwood East, and Wheelers Hill.

== Members for Glen Waverley ==
First incarnation (1985-2002)
Member	Party	Term
Ross Smith	Liberal	1985-2002

Second incarnation (2022–present)
John Mullahy	Labor	2022-present

== Election results ==
2022 Victorian state election: Glen Waverley
Party	Candidate	Votes	%	±%
Labor	John Mullahy	18,153	40.6	−1.5
Liberal	Neil Angus	17,941	40.2	−8.0
Greens	Steph Partridge	4,270	9.6	+1.3
Democratic Labour	Scott Marsh	1,856	4.1	+3.9
Family First	Kristeen Huisman	972	2.2	+2.2
Animal Justice	Maddy Hance	802	1.8	+1.8
Freedom	Joyce Maree Harris	664	1.5	+1.5
Total formal votes		44,667	96.7	+1.5
Informal votes		1,529	3.3	−1.5
Turnout		46,196	90.9	−3.0
Two-party-preferred result
Labor	John Mullahy	23,809	53.3	+4.2
Liberal	Neil Angus	20,858	46.7	−4.2
Labor notional gain from Liberal		Swing	+4.2	
