= John Richardson (Australian politician) =

Australian politician

John Ingles Richardson (born 15 March 1938) is a former Australian politician. He was the Liberal member for Forest Hill in the Victorian Legislative Assembly from 1976 to 2002.

Richardson was born in Shepparton to shopkeeper William Richardson and his wife Ethelwyn Ingles Smith. He attended public schools in Kerang before attending Ivanhoe Grammar School and finally Bendigo Teachers' College, from which he graduated as a primary teacher in 1957. He became a schoolteacher in Braybrook Primary School and a lecturer at Footscray Technical College; finally, in 1963, he received a Bachelor of Commerce from Melbourne University. On 11 May 1963, he married Alice Mary Salmon, with whom he had two children. In 1967, he became the manager of James Bennett Booksellers and Publishers; he was also a script-writer for the children's shows Magic Circle Club and Adventure Island, as well as the author of five children's books.

In 1976, Richardson was elected to the Victorian Parliament for Forest Hill as a member of the Liberal Party. In 1982 he became Shadow Minister for Educational Services, but later that year was moved to Consumer Affairs, with the additional portfolio of Assistant to the Leader of the Opposition. In 1983, he moved to Ethnic Affairs, but left the front bench in 1985. In 1989 he returned as Shadow Minister for Education, moving to Community Services, Housing and Aboriginal Affairs in 1990. He left the front bench again in 1991. Richardson remained a backbencher until his retirement in 2002.

== Publications ==
Richardson published five children's books:

- Wilfred the Wombat
- Gendarme the Police Horse
- Gendarme at Work
- Suey the Sheep Dog
- Ace the Guard Dog

Parliament of Victoria
Preceded by New seat	Member for Forest Hill; 1976–2002	Succeeded by Kirstie Marshall
