= Electoral district of Mount Waverley =

State electoral district of Victoria, Australia

Mount Waverley Victoria—Legislative Assembly
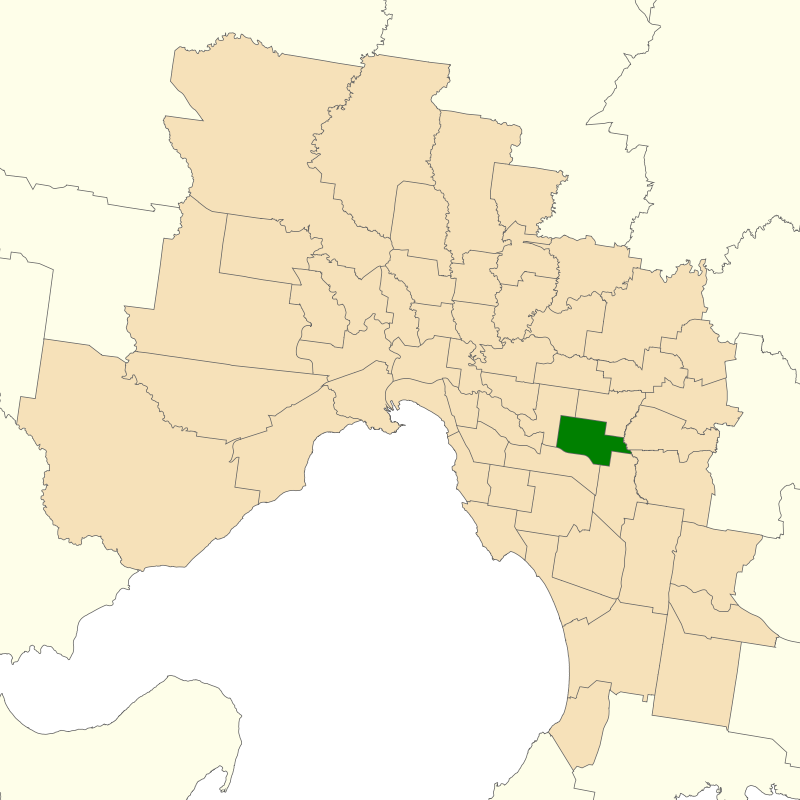
- Location of Mount Waverley (dark green) in Greater Melbourne
- State: Victoria
- Created: 2002
- Abolished: 2022
- Electors: 38,937 (2018)
- Area: 26 km^{2} (10.0 sq mi)
- Demographic: Metropolitan

The electoral district of Mount Waverley was an electoral district of the Victorian Legislative Assembly. It was located in the south-eastern suburbs of Melbourne and contained the suburbs of Glen Waverley and Mount Waverley.

The seat was created prior to the 2002 election replacing the normally safe Liberal seat of Glen Waverley. When created, Mount Waverley had a notional Liberal margin of 9.1% but it was won by Labor's Maxine Morand at the 2002 election in a swing of 11.4%. It was one of four seats won by Labor on Green preferences after trailing the Liberals on the primary vote results. Liberal candidate Michael Gidley won the seat at the 2010 state election with a swing of 7.4%. Gidley held the seat until being defeated by Labor's Matt Fregon at the 2018 state election.

The seat was abolished by the Electoral Boundaries Commission ahead of the 2022 election and split into the electoral districts of Glen Waverley and Ashwood.

== Members for Mount Waverley ==
Member	Party	Term
Maxine Morand	Labor	2002–2010
Michael Gidley	Liberal	2010–2018
Matt Fregon	Labor	2018–2022

== Election results ==
2018 Victorian state election: Mount Waverley
Party	Candidate	Votes	%	±%
Liberal	Michael Gidley	15,495	46.03	−5.12
Labor	Matt Fregon	14,722	43.74	+7.00
Greens	Justin McCarthy	3,444	10.23	+0.67
Total formal votes		33,661	94.94	−1.25
Informal votes		1,795	5.06	+1.25
Turnout		35,456	91.06	−2.23
Two-party-preferred result
Labor	Matt Fregon	17,453	51.85	+6.44
Liberal	Michael Gidley	16,208	48.15	−6.44
Labor gain from Liberal		Swing	+6.44	
