= Neil Angus =

Australian politician (born 1961)

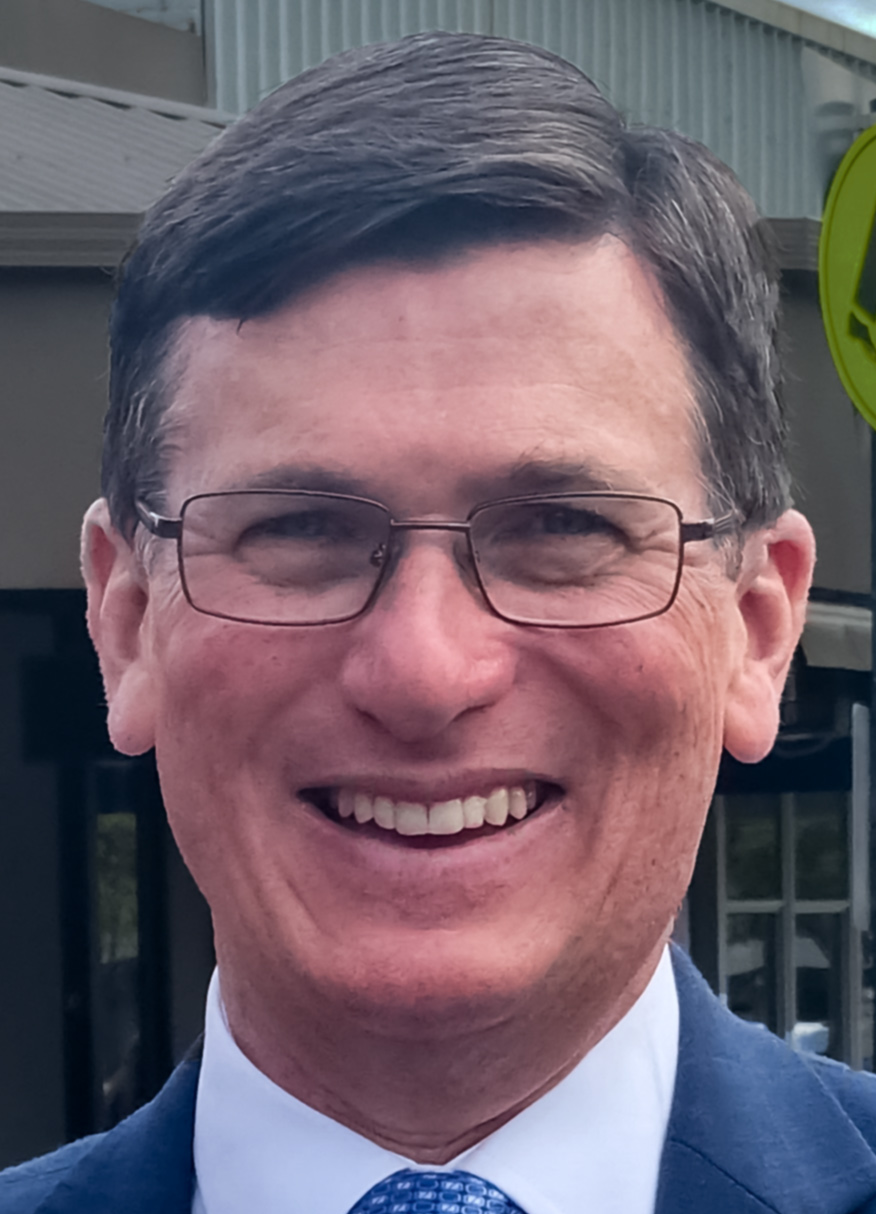

Member of the Victorian Parliament for Forest Hill
- In office 2 December 2010 – 26 November 2022
- Preceded by: Kirstie Marshall
- Succeeded by: Seat abolished

Personal details
- Born: 24 March 1961 (age 65) Melbourne, Victoria, Australia
- Party: Liberal Party
- Education: Carey Baptist Grammar School
- Alma mater: Swinburne University of Technology; Edith Cowan University
- Profession: Accountant
- Website: neilangus.com

Neil Andrew Warwick Angus (born 24 March 1961) is a former Member of the Victorian Legislative Assembly, representing the electoral district of Forest Hill. He was elected in 2010, and reelected in the 2014 and 2018 elections, before being defeated at the 2022 Victorian state election. While in Parliament, Angus variously held the shadow portfolios of Citizenship and Multicultural Affairs, Consumer Affairs, and Assistant Treasurer.

== Early life and education ==
Angus underwent his high school education at Carey Baptist Grammar School. His tertiary education includes a Bachelor of Business in Accounting from Swinburne University of Technology, and a Graduate Certificate in Financial investment from Edith Cowan University.

Angus worked as a Registered Company Auditor from 1992-2010 and a Certified Fraud Examiner from 2005–2012.

== Politics ==
Angus finished runner-up to Alan Tudge in the Liberal preselection ballot for the Division of Aston prior to the 2010 federal election.

=== State parliament ===
Angus was first elected in 2010 and re-elected in 2014 and 2018.

He served as a Shadow Minister from 2018 to 2021, but was dropped from the shadow minister on Matthew Guy’s return to the Liberal leadership.

In 2022, Angus was the only member of the Legislative Assembly who was not vaccinated against COVID-19, stating in late 2021 that he was ‘unwilling’ to have the vaccine, despite scientific consensus and official support from the Liberal opposition for vaccinations. Seeking preselection ahead of the 2022 election, Angus lobbied Liberal Party members to postpone the vote, to avoid him being excluded from it after unvaccinated people were banned from attending.

At the 2022 Victorian state election, Angus ran for the newly created seat of Glen Waverley after his seat, Forest Hill, was abolished in the 2021 redistribution. He was defeated by Labor’s John Mullahy.

In 2023, Angus sought a return to state parliament, nominating for Liberal preselection to fill a vacancy in the Legislative Council, following the announced retirement of Matthew Bach, however was unsuccessful.

== Personal life ==
Neil is married, has four children, and three grandchildren.

Victorian Legislative Assembly
Preceded by Kirstie Marshall	Member for Forest Hill; 2010–2022	Succeeded by Seat abolished
