= Burwood East =

- Suburb
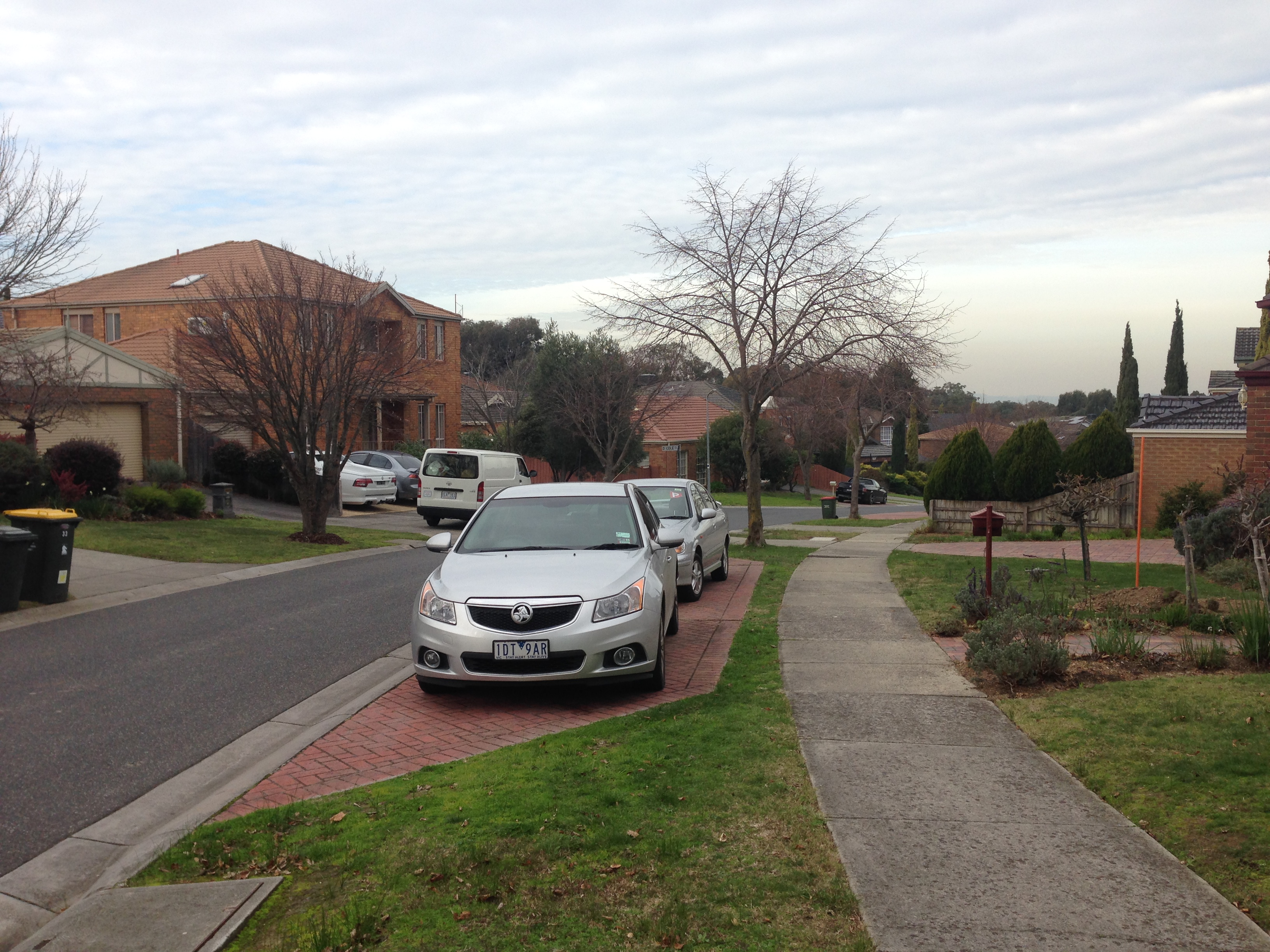
- Robinson Drive, Burwood East

- Interactive map of Burwood East
- Coordinates: 37.852°S 145.15°E
- Country: Australia
- State: Victoria
- City: Melbourne
- LGA: City of Whitehorse
- Location: 17 km (11 mi) from Melbourne

Government
  - State electorates: Ashwood; Box Hill; Glen Waverley
  - Federal divisions: Chisholm; Deakin

Area
  - Total: 4.3 km^{2} (1.7 sq mi)
- Elevation: 125 m (410 ft)

Population
  - Total: 10,675 (SAL 2021)
- Postcode: 3151
Suburbs around Burwood East
Box Hill South	Blackburn South	Forest Hill
Burwood	Burwood East	Vermont South
Chadstone	Mount Waverley	Glen Waverley

Red Williams Pear

Burwood East is a suburb of Melbourne, Victoria, Australia, located 17 km (11 mi) east of Melbourne's central business district, located within the City of Whitehorse local government area. Burwood East recorded a population of 10,675 at the 2021 census.

Burwood East is bounded by Springvale Road to the east, Middleborough Road to the west, Eley Road and Hawthorn Road to the north and Highbury Road to the south.

== History ==
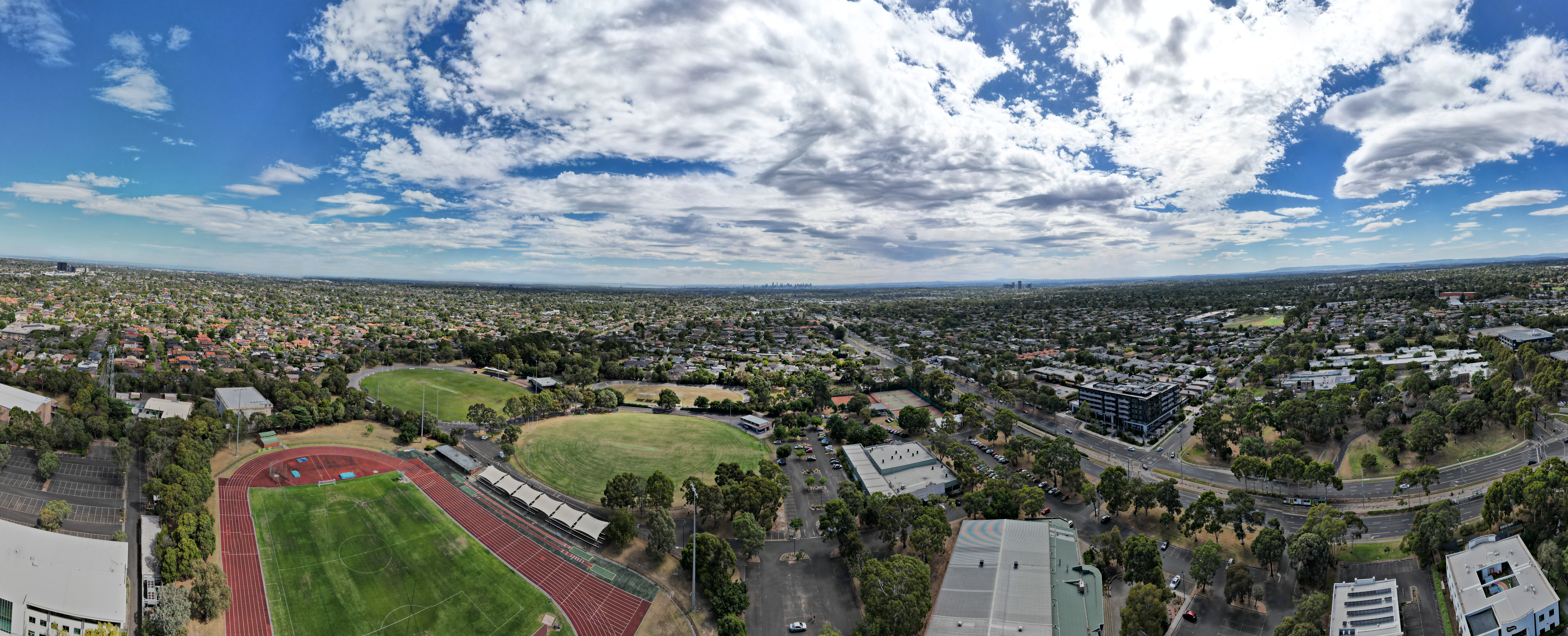
Burwood East aerial panorama facing the city

The Wurundjeri Aboriginal clan, one of four Koorie clans that inhabited the Port Phillip region, were the original occupants of the area now occupied by East Burwood. To the east of present-day Middleborough Road, much of the land was initially not very attractive to European squatters for settlement and parts were mostly covered with open forests, consisting of red stringybark, red box, long-leaved box, candlebark and manna gum. Highbury Park contains some of the few remaining stands of remnant vegetation, including the locally uncommon Shiny Wallaby-grass (Austrodanthonia induta).

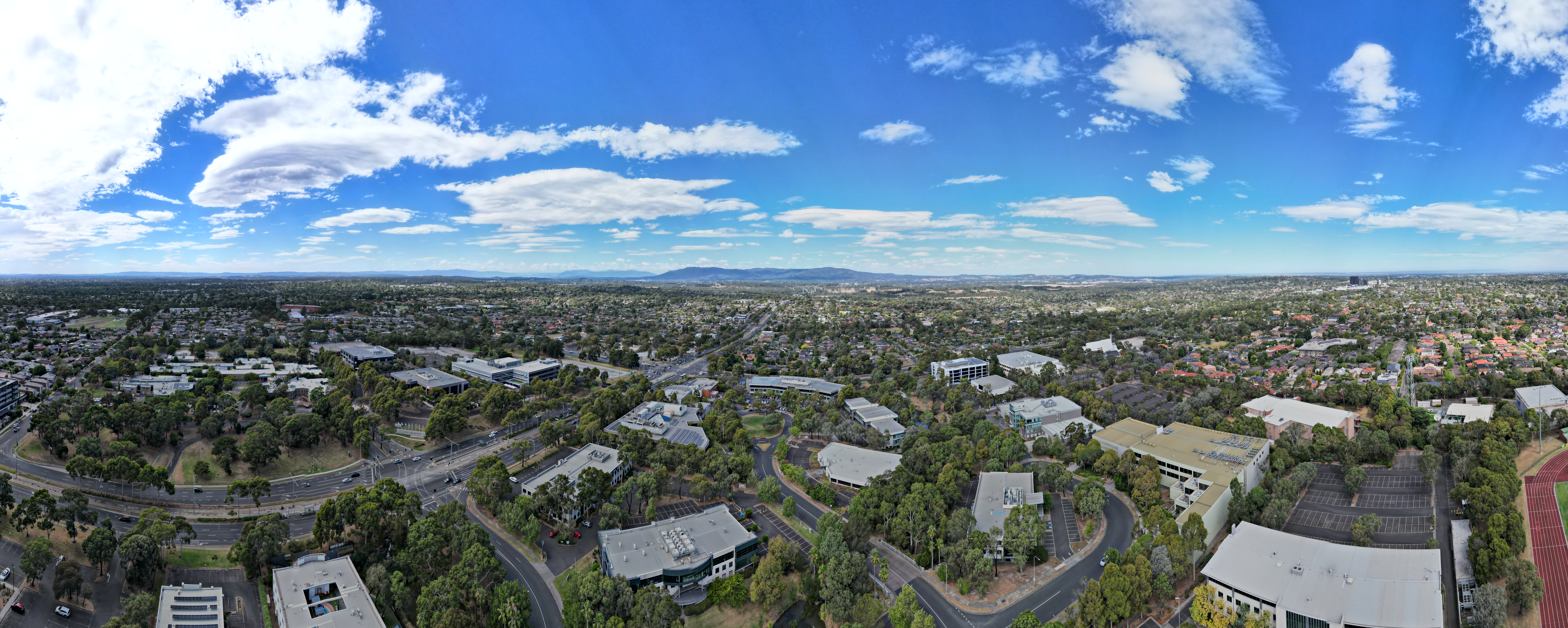
Burwood East facing the Dandenong Ranges to the East

By the mid 19th century, East Burwood and the surrounding districts were under cultivation and local horticulturists were supplying Melbourne's markets, including the Victoria Markets, with cut flowers and produce. Jonquils and Daffodils were harvested in the area well into the 1950s. Apple, cherry and pear groves covered the hill slopes for close to a century. The earliest orchardist was James Tainton who placed 50 acres of land under cultivation in the 1880s. Another orchardist Walter Mock developed the Red Williams' pear variety in East Burwood during the 1930s. The "Reds" found favour and the variety was exported to Europe and North America. However little more than thirty years later, the last of the orchards located in East Burwood had been ripped up or relocated in one case, to Bacchus Marsh.

== Commercial activity ==
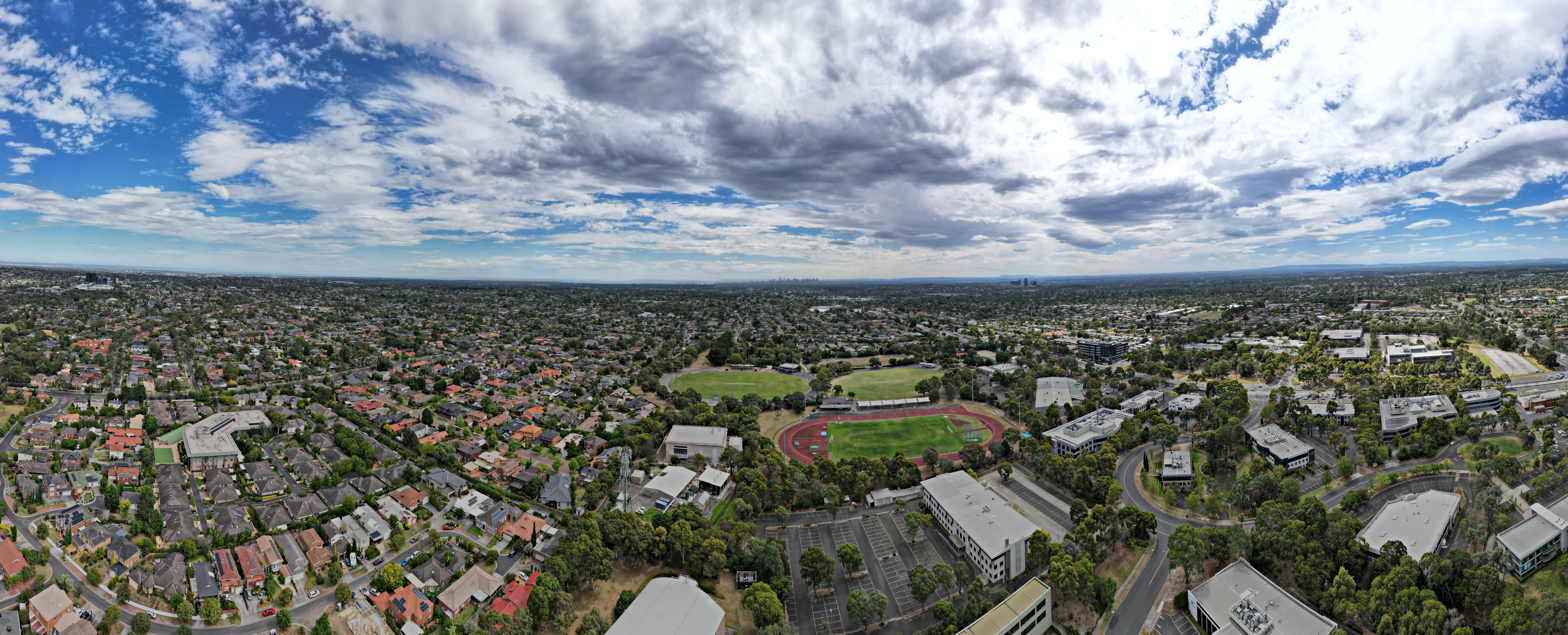
Aerial panorama of Burwood East reserve facing the city skyline

Burwood East is notable as the site of the first Kmart department store in Australia. The Kmart Plaza store opened in 1969, at the intersection of Burwood Road (now Highway) and Blackburn Road. It was the first 24-hour Kmart store and proved very popular with locals, frustrated with the limited shopping hours on offer at the time. Burwood East Kmart is the second largest in Australia, with a gross leasable area of 8,444 m^{2} (90,890 sq ft).

The Tally Ho Business Park, on the corner of Burwood Highway and Springvale Road, hosts the headquarters of many corporations and organisations, including the Country Fire Authority and former regional headquarters of VicRoads and Yokogawa. The site of the Tally Ho Business Park and its surrounds was previously occupied by the Tally Ho Boys' Home, which was established on land provided at a reduced price to the Methodist Church by Abel Hoadley, the inventor of the Violet Crumble chocolate bar. The Violet Crumble was supposedly manufactured in a Cottage where the ABC now stands.

On the north side of Burwood Highway, there are additional business buildings including a HP building, expanding the business park beyond the boundary of the original Tally Ho Boys' Home.

Vision Drive (located adjacent to the Tally Ho Business Park) is the current location of World Vision Australia's National Office, The GPT Group and the National Archives of Australia (Melbourne Repository).

== Population ==
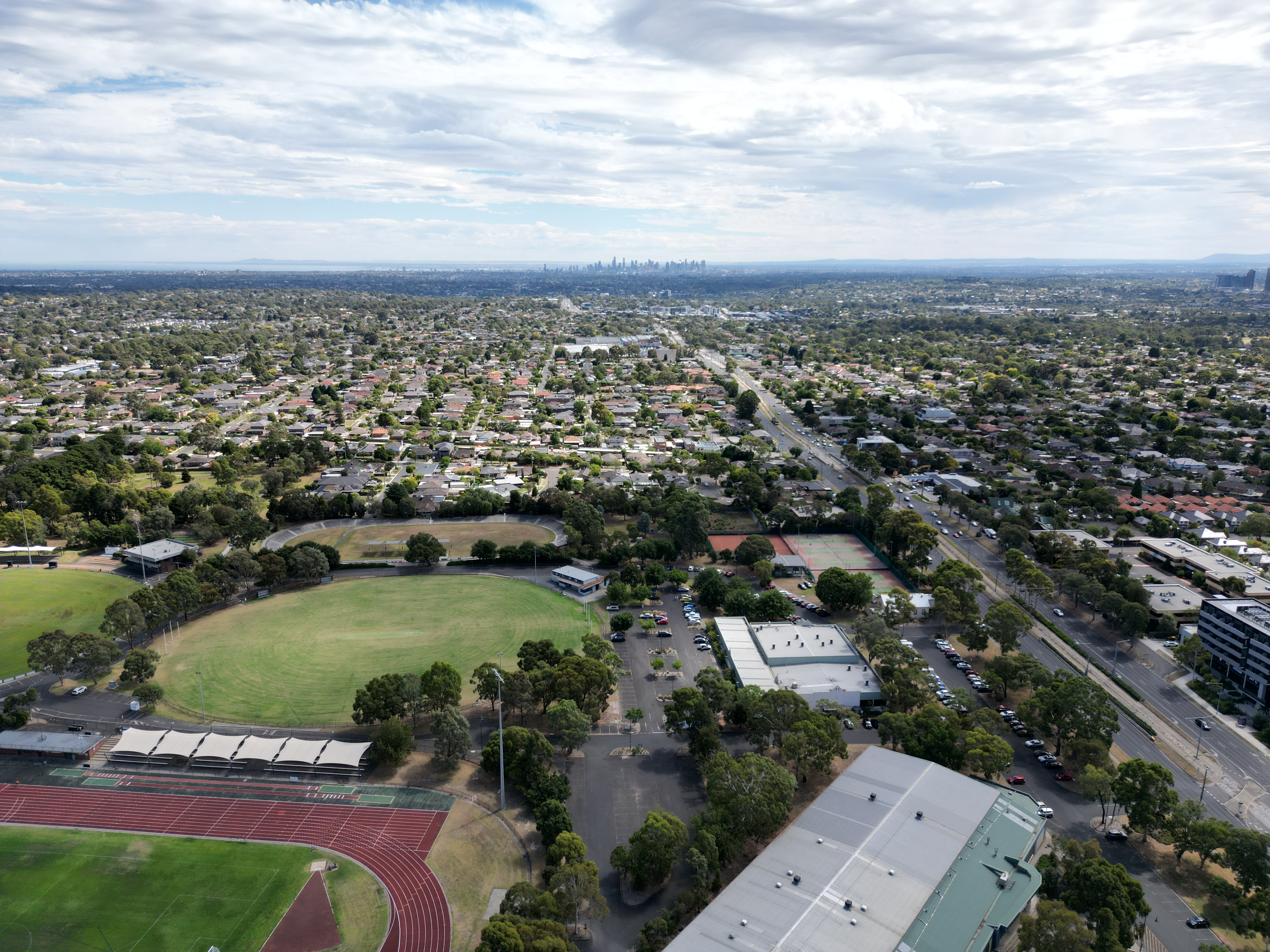
Aerial perspective of Burwood East reserve facing west to the city skyline

In the 2016 Census, there were 10,273 people in Burwood East. 48.1% of people were born in Australia. The next most common countries of birth were China 14.8%, Greece 4.1%, India 3.6%, Sri Lanka 3.2% and Malaysia 2.7%. 44.6% of people spoke only English at home. Other languages spoken at home included Mandarin 15.7%, Greek 8.9%, Cantonese 6.0%, Vietnamese 2.3% and Sinhalese 2.2%. The most common responses for religion were No Religion 32.3%, Catholic 17.8%, Eastern Orthodox 10.4% and Buddhism 7.3%.

== Transport ==
Burwood East is serviced by public transport:

- 703 Middle Brighton – Blackburn via Bentleigh Station, Clayton, Monash University, Syndal Station (every day). Operated by Ventura Bus Lines.
- 732 Box Hill – Upper Ferntree Gully via Vermont South, Westfield Knox (every day). Operated by Ventura Bus Lines.
- 735 Box Hill – Nunawading via Forest Hill Chase (every day). Operated by Ventura Bus Lines.
- 736 Mitcham – Blackburn via Vermont South, Glen Waverley Station, Forest Hill Chase (every day). Operated by Ventura Bus Lines.

Burwood Highway is part of Melbourne's Tram Network. Tram Route 75 originally terminated at the intersection of Blackburn Road and Burwood Highway until July 2005, with the completion of the 3 km line extension to Hartland Road in Vermont South. Also, with the introduction of the new Myki ticketing system, the tram zone boundaries have also been extended. This is good news for Route 75 passengers travelling across Zone 1+2, as they now only need to pay Zone 1 fares.

== Sport ==
Burwood East is home to the Nunawading Basketball Centre, Nunawading Velodrome, East Burwood/Bennettswood Cricket Club and East Burwood Football Club, on Burwood Highway.

Football has been played in Burwood East since 1915 and local fruit and flower growers produced an abundance of footballers. The club has built a family tradition and families names such as Fankhauser, Tainton and Mullens. Today the club competes in the Eastern Football League.

== Education ==
Schools in the suburb include:

- Forest Hill College
- Burwood East Primary School
- Burwood Heights Primary School
- Blackburn English Language School
- Burwood East Special Developmental School

== Local churches ==
- Burwood Heights Uniting Church
- Anglican Church of the Ascension
- Crossway

== Tally Ho ==
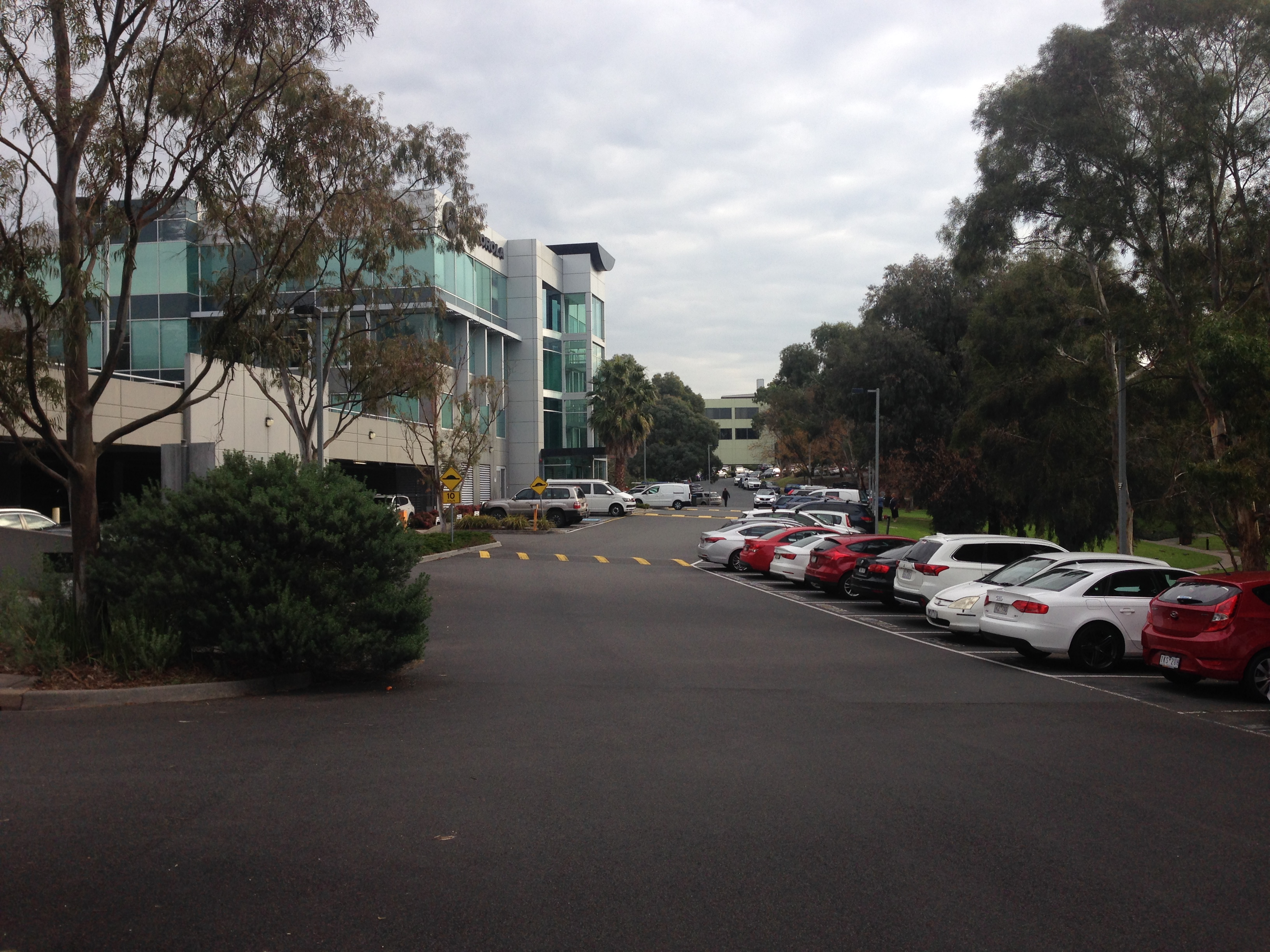
Tally Ho Business Park in June 2018

Tally Ho is an unbounded locality within Burwood East centred (37.857°S 145.166°E) on the intersection of Burwood Highway and Springvale Road and is approximately 18 km east of the Melbourne Central Business District. Originally a rural area, the neighbourhood is named after a hotel which stood beside a shop on the corner of Blackburn Road and Highbury Road during the 1870s and 1880s. Opposite the hotel a primitive racecourse was constructed, and although the roads were considered in poor repair, activities there attracted large crowds. In October 1888 the hotel was destroyed by fire but later rebuilt but in 1922 moves were made to close the hotel along with a number of others A small shopping centre now occupies the area where the hotel once stood.

The Tally Ho Boys Home was established nearby by the Wesley Mission of the Methodist Church in 1902. Later closed, it became the Tally Ho Business Park.

== Current and future developments ==
The State Government has declared the Burwood Heights area as a 'Major Activity Centre' because of the easy access to public transport, current uses and the potential for significant development. In March 2008 Whitehorse Council approved a development plan that will see housing for up to 1000 residents at the old brickworks site in East Burwood.

The development will comprise over 25,000sqm of retail floorspace, multiscreen cinemas, up to 700 dwellings, leisure and entertainment and community facilities, all based around "main street" retail/entertainment precinct and urban plaza. The project is scheduled for completion in 2015. Details of the Burwood Heights Activity Center Project are listed . However, the progress of the project is stalled or very slow.

Kmart Plaza has also undergo a facelift, with renovations scheduled to start early 2010. The owners of the Kmart Plaza, also known as the East Burwood Plaza, will double the size of the complex, on the corner of Burwood Highway and Blackburn Road, from 15,000 square metres to 30,000 square metres. The new leasing floor plan can be viewed here.

Pomeroy Pacific development manager Paul Chiodo said the $35 million extension will add about 30 speciality shops, a 5,500-square-metre (59,000 sq ft) Coles Supermarket, a 333-seat restaurant, gymnasium and a First Choice bottle shop. The extension will be built over an existing car park, on the western side of the 6.3-hectare (16-acre) site.

German discount supermarket chain Aldi has leased the 2,981-square-metre (32,090 sq ft) supermarket space currently occupied by Coles. Kmart, which occupies about 8,444 square metres (90,890 sq ft) of space and trades 24-hours a day, will not relocate. Construction work is currently underway, with stage 1 completed in 2011, and the centre is named to be 'Burwood One' .

RSPCA (Royal Society for the Prevention of Cruelty to Animals) Burwood East is the largest RSPCA animal shelter in Victoria and features an animal adoption centre, animal shelter, veterinary clinic, animal behaviour training, grooming and education centre. Animal ambulance services also operate out of the Burwood East location. The site is undergoing a substantial re-development, scheduled for completion is mid-2013.

On 10 December 2019, the shopping centre development at the old brickworks site, called Burwood Brickworks, officially opened. Burwood Brickworks notably has a 2,000-square-metre (22,000 sq ft) rooftop farm to service an in house Acre Farm and Eatery restaurant, along with housing a Woolworths store. The centre aims to meet the Living Building Challenge requirements, in terms of having zero carbon footprint, no waste, non toxic materials, growing 20% of the food used, and net generation of electricity and water, aimed to be what the developer describes as "the most sustainable shopping centre in the world". Despite this, in July 2022, ABC News reported that the Brickworks establishment had been given approval to allow untreated stormwater to run into Gardiners Creek. The developer, Frasers Property, originally had plans to build a wetland with support from Melbourne Water, but they later reversed their support, calling the proposal unsafe. Environmentalist Karin Traeger has expressed concerns that this decision will result in more pollution ending up in Gardiners Creek, and consequently the Yarra River. She also said that polluted stormwater is one of the main issues affecting the river's health. The developer is instead paying $220,000 in stormwater offsets to meet their obligations.

The adjacent residences are to be completed some time in mid-2021.

== See also ==
- City of Nunawading – Burwood East was previously within this former local government area.
