= Matt Fregon =

Australian politician

Matt Fregon MP

Member of the Victorian Legislative Assembly for Ashwood
- Incumbent
- Assumed office 26 November 2022
- Preceded by: constituency established

Member of the Victorian Legislative Assembly for Mount Waverley
- In office 24 November 2018 – 26 November 2022
- Preceded by: Michael Gidley

Personal details
- Party: Labor Party
- Education: Deakin University
- Website: www.mattfregon.com.au

Matthew John Fregon is an Australian politician. He has been a Labor Party member of the Victorian Legislative Assembly since November 2018, representing the seat of Mount Waverley from 2018 to 2022 and Ashwood from 2022 onwards.

Before his election, Fregon owned and managed a small IT firm. Fregon completed a Bachelor of Business (Computing) at Deakin University in 1992.

On 20 December 2022, Fregon was elected as Deputy Speaker of the Legislative Assembly.

Parliament of Victoria
Preceded by Michael Gidley	Member for Mount Waverley; 2018–2022	District abolished
District created	Member for Ashwood; 2022–present	Incumbent
