= Results of the 1924 Victorian state election (Legislative Assembly) =

Australian state election results

Victorian state election, 26 June 1924 Legislative Assembly << 1921–1927 >>
| Enrolled voters | 626,250 | | | | |
| Votes cast | 370,963 | | Turnout | 59.24 | +1.97 |
| Informal votes | 3,739 | | Informal | 1.01 | +0.23 |
Summary of votes by party
| Party | Primary votes | % | Swing | Seats | Change |
| Nationalist | 143,379 | 39.04 | −6.55 | 19 | −9 |
| Labor | 128,056 | 34.87 | −0.79 | 27 | +4 |
| Country | 43,961 | 11.97 | −2.04 | 13 | 0 |
| Australian Liberal | 23,062 | 6.28 | +8.84 | 5 | +5 |
| Progressive Liberal | 16,986 | 4.62 | +4.62 | 0 | 0 |
| Independent | 11,780 | 3.21 | −1.52 | 1 | 0 |
| Total | 367,224 | | | 65 | |

This is a list of electoral district results for the 1924 Victorian state election.

== Results by electoral district ==
=== Abbotsford ===
1924 Victorian state election: Abbotsford
| Party | Candidate | Votes | % | ±% |
|---|---|---|---|---|
| Labor | Gordon Webber | unopposed | | |
| Labor hold | | Swing | | |

=== Albert Park ===
1924 Victorian state election: Albert Park
| Party | Candidate | Votes | % | ±% |
|---|---|---|---|---|
| Labor | Arthur Wallace | 7,262 | 61.6 | +8.3 |
| Nationalist | John Atkinson | 2,550 | 21.6 | −25.1 |
| Independent Liberal | Selwyn Neale | 1,748 | 14.8 | +14.8 |
| Independent Liberal | Thomas Craine | 2,550 | 1.9 | +1.9 |
| Total formal votes | | 11,788 | 97.6 | −2.1 |
| Informal votes | | 286 | 2.4 | +2.1 |
| Turnout | | 12,074 | 59.1 | +5.8 |
Two-party-preferred result
| Labor | Arthur Wallace | | 63.3 | +10.0 |
| Nationalist | John Atkinson | | 36.7 | −10.0 |
| Labor hold | | Swing | +10.0 | |

- Two party preferred vote was estimated.

=== Allandale ===
1924 Victorian state election: Allandale
| Party | Candidate | Votes | % | ±% |
|---|---|---|---|---|
| Nationalist | Alexander Peacock | unopposed | | |
| Nationalist hold | | Swing | | |

=== Ballarat East ===
1924 Victorian state election: Ballarat East
| Party | Candidate | Votes | % | ±% |
|---|---|---|---|---|
| Nationalist | Robert McGregor | 3,533 | 48.9 | −10.3 |
| Labor | William McAdam | 3,403 | 47.1 | +6.3 |
| Independent Labor | Alfred Elliott | 290 | 4.0 | +4.0 |
| Total formal votes | | 7,226 | 98.7 | −0.5 |
| Informal votes | | 97 | 1.3 | +0.5 |
| Turnout | | 7,323 | 75.1 | +3.9 |
Two-party-preferred result
| Labor | William McAdam | 3,613 | 50.0 | +9.2 |
| Nationalist | Robert McGregor | 3,609 | 50.0 | −9.2 |
| Labor gain from Nationalist | | Swing | +9.2 | |

=== Ballarat West ===
1924 Victorian state election: Ballarat West
| Party | Candidate | Votes | % | ±% |
|---|---|---|---|---|
| Nationalist | Matthew Baird | 4,286 | 57.5 | −9.7 |
| Labor | Mark Lazarus | 3,163 | 42.5 | +9.7 |
| Total formal votes | | 7,449 | 99.4 | −0.2 |
| Informal votes | | 42 | 0.6 | +0.2 |
| Turnout | | 7,491 | 75.1 | +7.7 |
| Nationalist hold | | Swing | −9.7 | |

=== Barwon ===
1924 Victorian state election: Barwon
| Party | Candidate | Votes | % | ±% |
|---|---|---|---|---|
| Nationalist | Edward Morley | 5,086 | 69.5 | +29.5 |
| Labor | Alicia Katz | 2,228 | 30.5 | +11.4 |
| Total formal votes | | 7,314 | 99.3 | +0.8 |
| Informal votes | | 53 | 0.7 | −0.8 |
| Turnout | | 7,367 | 69.6 | +4.1 |
| Nationalist hold | | Swing | N/A | |

=== Benalla ===
1924 Victorian state election: Benalla
| Party | Candidate | Votes | % | ±% |
|---|---|---|---|---|
| Country | John Carlisle | 2,397 | 61.6 | −3.2 |
| Nationalist | Alexander Mitchell | 1,494 | 38.4 | +3.2 |
| Total formal votes | | 3,891 | 99.5 | +0.7 |
| Informal votes | | 19 | 0.5 | −0.7 |
| Turnout | | 3,910 | 55.0 | −2.4 |
| Country hold | | Swing | −3.2 | |

=== Benambra ===
1924 Victorian state election: Benambra
| Party | Candidate | Votes | % | ±% |
|---|---|---|---|---|
| Nationalist | Henry Beardmore | 2,714 | 74.8 | −25.2 |
| Country | John Hall | 914 | 25.2 | +25.2 |
| Total formal votes | | 3,627 | 99.3 | |
| Informal votes | | 27 | 0.7 | |
| Turnout | | 3,654 | 54.5 | |
| Nationalist hold | | Swing | N/A | |

=== Bendigo East ===
1924 Victorian state election: Bendigo East
| Party | Candidate | Votes | % | ±% |
|---|---|---|---|---|
| Labor | Luke Clough | 3,327 | 60.2 | +0.2 |
| Nationalist | John Michelsen | 2,202 | 39.8 | −0.2 |
| Total formal votes | | 5,529 | 99.5 | +0.2 |
| Informal votes | | 28 | 0.5 | −0.2 |
| Turnout | | 5,557 | 67.7 | +5.8 |
| Labor hold | | Swing | +0.2 | |

=== Bendigo West ===
1924 Victorian state election: Bendigo West
| Party | Candidate | Votes | % | ±% |
|---|---|---|---|---|
| Labor | Arthur Cook | 3,425 | 51.3 | +3.9 |
| Nationalist | Edwin Ham | 3,247 | 48.7 | −3.9 |
| Total formal votes | | 6,672 | 99.1 | −0.4 |
| Informal votes | | 58 | 0.9 | +0.4 |
| Turnout | | 6,730 | 74.6 | +8.5 |
| Labor gain from Nationalist | | Swing | +3.9 | |

=== Boroondara ===
1924 Victorian state election: Boroondara
| Party | Candidate | Votes | % | ±% |
|---|---|---|---|---|
| Nationalist | Edmund Greenwood | 17,670 | 63.1 | −36.9 |
| Independent Liberal | Philip Jacobs | 10,348 | 36.9 | +36.9 |
| Total formal votes | | 28,018 | 99.6 | |
| Informal votes | | 127 | 0.4 | |
| Turnout | | 28,145 | 44.6 | |
| Nationalist hold | | Swing | N/A | |

=== Borung ===
1924 Victorian state election: Borung
| Party | Candidate | Votes | % | ±% |
|---|---|---|---|---|
| Country | David Allison | 1,901 | 51.2 | −1.4 |
| Country | Edwin Reseigh | 932 | 25.1 | +25.1 |
| Country | George Clyne | 878 | 23.7 | +23.7 |
| Total formal votes | | 3,711 | 98.7 | −0.8 |
| Informal votes | | 51 | 1.3 | +0.8 |
| Turnout | | 3,762 | 47.9 | −23.9 |
| Country hold | | Swing | N/A | |

=== Brighton ===
1924 Victorian state election: Brighton
| Party | Candidate | Votes | % | ±% |
|---|---|---|---|---|
| Australian Liberal | Oswald Snowball | 10,692 | 64.6 | +64.6 |
| Nationalist | Henry Crowther | 5,869 | 35.4 | −64.6 |
| Total formal votes | | 16.561 | 99.5 | |
| Informal votes | | 88 | 0.5 | |
| Turnout | | 16,649 | 54.5 | |
| Member changed to Australian Liberal from Nationalist | | Swing | N/A | |

=== Brunswick ===
1924 Victorian state election: Brunswick
| Party | Candidate | Votes | % | ±% |
|---|---|---|---|---|
| Labor | James Jewell | unopposed | | |
| Labor hold | | Swing | | |

=== Bulla ===
1924 Victorian state election: Bulla
| Party | Candidate | Votes | % | ±% |
|---|---|---|---|---|
| Labor | Ralph Hjorth | 3,301 | 45.6 | +45.6 |
| Nationalist | Andrew Robertson | 2,359 | 32.6 | −67.4 |
| Country | Henry Pickering | 1,577 | 21.8 | +21.8 |
| Total formal votes | | 7,237 | 98.2 | |
| Informal votes | | 133 | 1.8 | |
| Turnout | | 7,370 | 62.4 | |
Two-party-preferred result
| Labor | Ralph Hjorth | 3,695 | 51.1 | +51.1 |
| Nationalist | Andrew Robertson | 3,542 | 48.9 | −51.1 |
| Labor gain from Nationalist | | Swing | N/A | |

=== Carlton ===
1924 Victorian state election: Carlton
| Party | Candidate | Votes | % | ±% |
|---|---|---|---|---|
| Labor | Robert Solly | unopposed | | |
| Labor hold | | Swing | | |

=== Castlemaine and Maldon ===
1924 Victorian state election: Castlemaine and Maldon
| Party | Candidate | Votes | % | ±% |
|---|---|---|---|---|
| Nationalist | Harry Lawson | 3,075 | 68.0 | −6.2 |
| Labor | William Webber | 1,450 | 32.0 | +6.2 |
| Total formal votes | | 4,525 | 99.8 | +0.3 |
| Informal votes | | 9 | 0.2 | −0.3 |
| Turnout | | 4,534 | 72.6 | +7.1 |
| Nationalist hold | | Swing | −6.2 | |

=== Collingwood ===
1924 Victorian state election: Collingwood
| Party | Candidate | Votes | % | ±% |
|---|---|---|---|---|
| Labor | Tom Tunnecliffe | unopposed | | |
| Labor hold | | Swing | | |

=== Dalhousie ===
1924 Victorian state election: Dalhousie
| Party | Candidate | Votes | % | ±% |
|---|---|---|---|---|
| Labor | Reg Pollard | 2,232 | 40.8 | +40.8 |
| Nationalist | Angus McNab | 1,796 | 32.9 | −67.1 |
| Country | Gerald McKenna | 1,438 | 26.3 | +26.3 |
| Total formal votes | | 5,466 | 99.4 | |
| Informal votes | | 36 | 0.6 | |
| Turnout | | 5,502 | 82.1 | |
Two-party-preferred result
| Labor | Reg Pollard | 2,857 | 52.3 | +52.3 |
| Nationalist | Angus McNab | 2,609 | 47.7 | −52.3 |
| Labor gain from Nationalist | | Swing | N/A | |

=== Dandenong ===
1924 Victorian state election: Dandenong
| Party | Candidate | Votes | % | ±% |
|---|---|---|---|---|
| Nationalist | Frank Groves | 5,227 | 52.8 | −15.9 |
| Labor | Roy Beardsworth | 3,128 | 31.6 | +0.3 |
| Independent | Henry Harris | 1,545 | 15.6 | +15.6 |
| Total formal votes | | 9,900 | 98.1 | −1.3 |
| Informal votes | | 193 | 1.9 | +1.3 |
| Turnout | | 10,093 | 51.7 | +6.0 |
Two-party-preferred result
| Nationalist | Frank Groves | | 60.6 | −8.1 |
| Labor | Roy Beardsworth | | 39.4 | +8.1 |
| Nationalist hold | | Swing | −8.1 | |

- Two party preferred vote was estimated.

=== Daylesford ===
1924 Victorian state election: Daylesford
| Party | Candidate | Votes | % | ±% |
|---|---|---|---|---|
| Labor | James McDonald | 2,668 | 52.3 | +10.4 |
| Nationalist | Roderick McLeod | 2,435 | 47.7 | −10.4 |
| Total formal votes | | 5,103 | 99.7 | +0.1 |
| Informal votes | | 17 | 0.3 | −0.1 |
| Turnout | | 5,120 | 82.8 | +20.7 |
| Labor gain from Nationalist | | Swing | +10.4 | |

=== Dundas ===
1924 Victorian state election: Dundas
| Party | Candidate | Votes | % | ±% |
|---|---|---|---|---|
| Labor | Bill Slater | 3,282 | 54.0 | −5.5 |
| Nationalist | Albert Borella | 2,795 | 46.0 | +5.5 |
| Total formal votes | | 6,077 | 99.8 | +0.8 |
| Informal votes | | 15 | 0.2 | −0.8 |
| Turnout | | 6,092 | 73.8 | +4.9 |
| Labor hold | | Swing | −5.5 | |

=== Eaglehawk ===
1924 Victorian state election: Eaglehawk
| Party | Candidate | Votes | % | ±% |
|---|---|---|---|---|
| Country | Albert Dunstan | 2,747 | 83.4 | +46.1 |
| Nationalist | Albert Hodsworth | 546 | 16.6 | −4.7 |
| Total formal votes | | 3,293 | 99.5 | +1.4 |
| Informal votes | | 16 | 0.5 | −1.4 |
| Turnout | | 3,309 | 56.5 | −20.0 |
| Country hold | | Swing | N/A | |

=== East Melbourne ===
1924 Victorian state election: East Melbourne
| Party | Candidate | Votes | % | ±% |
|---|---|---|---|---|
| Labor | George Hooper | 2,625 | 47.5 | +1.8 |
| Australian Liberal | Alfred Farthing | 2,542 | 46.0 | +46.0 |
| Independent | William Carnegie | 363 | 6.5 | +6.5 |
| Total formal votes | | 5,530 | 97.2 | −2.2 |
| Informal votes | | 161 | 2.8 | +2.2 |
| Turnout | | 5,691 | 52.0 | +9.4 |
Two-candidate-preferred result
| Australian Liberal | Alfred Farthing | 2,826 | 51.1 | +51.1 |
| Labor | George Hooper | 2,704 | 48.9 | +3.2 |
| Australian Liberal gain from Nationalist | | Swing | N/A | |

=== Essendon ===
1924 Victorian state election: Essendon
| Party | Candidate | Votes | % | ±% |
|---|---|---|---|---|
| Labor | Frank Keane | 12,375 | 55.0 | +10.9 |
| Nationalist | Thomas Ryan | 10,106 | 45.0 | −10.9 |
| Total formal votes | | 22,481 | 99.6 | −0.1 |
| Informal votes | | 96 | 0.4 | +0.1 |
| Turnout | | 22,577 | 61.0 | +2.9 |
| Labor gain from Nationalist | | Swing | +10.9 | |

=== Evelyn ===
1924 Victorian state election: Evelyn
| Party | Candidate | Votes | % | ±% |
|---|---|---|---|---|
| Australian Liberal | William Everard | 4,553 | 77.6 | +77.6 |
| Nationalist | Herbert Hewitt | 1,317 | 22.4 | −58.6 |
| Total formal votes | | 5,870 | 99.4 | 0.0 |
| Informal votes | | 34 | 0.6 | 0.0 |
| Turnout | | 5,904 | 48.3 | +1.0 |
| Australian Liberal gain from Nationalist | | Swing | N/A | |

- William Everard was the sitting Nationalist MP for Evelyn.

=== Fitzroy ===
1924 Victorian state election: Fitzroy
| Party | Candidate | Votes | % | ±% |
|---|---|---|---|---|
| Labor | John Billson | unopposed | | |
| Labor hold | | Swing | | |

=== Flemington ===
1924 Victorian state election: Flemington
| Party | Candidate | Votes | % | ±% |
|---|---|---|---|---|
| Labor | Edward Warde | unopposed | | |
| Labor hold | | Swing | | |

=== Geelong ===
1924 Victorian state election: Geelong
| Party | Candidate | Votes | % | ±% |
|---|---|---|---|---|
| Labor | William Brownbill | 6,197 | 55.6 | +0.8 |
| Nationalist | Thomas Maltby | 4,943 | 44.4 | −0.8 |
| Total formal votes | | 11,140 | 99.7 | +0.4 |
| Informal votes | | 37 | 0.3 | −0.4 |
| Turnout | | 11,177 | 72.5 | +7.3 |
| Labor hold | | Swing | +0.8 | |

=== Gippsland East ===
1924 Victorian state election: Gippsland East
| Party | Candidate | Votes | % | ±% |
|---|---|---|---|---|
| Country | Albert Lind | unopposed | | |
| Country hold | | Swing | | |

=== Gippsland North ===
1924 Victorian state election: Gippsland North
| Party | Candidate | Votes | % | ±% |
|---|---|---|---|---|
| Independent Labor | James McLachlan | 4,533 | 70.6 | −7.3 |
| Labor | David O'Donnell | 1,401 | 21.8 | −0.3 |
| Country | Matthew Boland | 484 | 7.5 | +7.5 |
| Total formal votes | | 6,481 | 99.0 | −0.2 |
| Informal votes | | 68 | 1.0 | +0.2 |
| Turnout | | 6,486 | 68.0 | +8.8 |
Two-candidate-preferred result
| Independent Labor | James McLachlan | | 77.9 | 0.0 |
| Labor | David O'Donnell | | 22.1 | 0.0 |
| Independent Labor hold | | Swing | 0.0 | |

- Two candidate preferred vote was estimated.

=== Gippsland South ===
1924 Victorian state election: Gippsland South
| Party | Candidate | Votes | % | ±% |
|---|---|---|---|---|
| Nationalist | Walter West | unopposed | | |
| Nationalist hold | | Swing | | |

=== Gippsland West ===
1924 Victorian state election: Gippsland West
| Party | Candidate | Votes | % | ±% |
|---|---|---|---|---|
| Country | Arthur Walter | 2,830 | 47.6 | +47.6 |
| Nationalist | Ernest Bremner | 1,602 | 27.0 | −73.0 |
| Labor | John McKellar | 1,510 | 25.4 | +25.4 |
| Total formal votes | | 5,942 | 99.1 | |
| Informal votes | | 53 | 0.9 | |
| Turnout | | 5,995 | 63.9 | |
Two-candidate-preferred result
| Country | Arthur Walter | 3,966 | 66.8 | +66.8 |
| Nationalist | Ernest Bremner | 1,976 | 33.2 | −66.8 |
| Country gain from Nationalist | | Swing | N/A | |

=== Glenelg ===
1924 Victorian state election: Glenelg
| Party | Candidate | Votes | % | ±% |
|---|---|---|---|---|
| Labor | William Thomas | 3,465 | 50.9 | −2.2 |
| Nationalist | Hugh MacLeod | 2,555 | 37.5 | −9.4 |
| Country | Charles Waters | 787 | 11.6 | +11.6 |
| Total formal votes | | 6,807 | 98.5 | −1.0 |
| Informal votes | | 106 | 1.5 | +1.0 |
| Turnout | | 6,913 | 76.6 | +1.3 |
Two-party-preferred result
| Labor | William Thomas | | 52.1 | −1.0 |
| Nationalist | Hugh MacLeod | | 47.9 | +1.0 |
| Labor hold | | Swing | −1.0 | |

- Two party preferred vote was estimated.

=== Goulburn Valley ===
1924 Victorian state election: Goulburn Valley
| Party | Candidate | Votes | % | ±% |
|---|---|---|---|---|
| Country | Murray Bourchier | unopposed | | |
| Country hold | | Swing | | |

=== Grenville ===
1924 Victorian state election: Grenville
| Party | Candidate | Votes | % | ±% |
|---|---|---|---|---|
| Labor | Arthur Hughes | 1,735 | 54.8 | +10.2 |
| Country | David Gibson | 792 | 25.0 | +0.7 |
| Nationalist | George Burchett | 638 | 20.2 | −10.1 |
| Total formal votes | | 3,165 | 98.5 | −0.5 |
| Informal votes | | 47 | 1.5 | +0.5 |
| Turnout | | 3,212 | 75.5 | +0.6 |
Two-party-preferred result
| Labor | Arthur Hughes | | 56.8 | +1.7 |
| Country | David Gibson | | 43.2 | +43.2 |
| Labor hold | | Swing | +1.7 | |

- Two party preferred vote was estimated.

=== Gunbower ===
1924 Victorian state election: Gunbower
| Party | Candidate | Votes | % | ±% |
|---|---|---|---|---|
| Australian Liberal | Henry Angus | 3,289 | 55.2 | +55.2 |
| Country | William McCann | 2,664 | 44.8 | +1.2 |
| Total formal votes | | 5,953 | 98.9 | −0.5 |
| Informal votes | | 64 | 1.1 | +0.5 |
| Turnout | | 6,017 | 65.6 | −3.7 |
| Australian Liberal gain from Nationalist | | Swing | N/A | |

- Henry Angus was the sitting Nationalist MP for Gunbower.

=== Hampden ===
1924 Victorian state election: Hampden
| Party | Candidate | Votes | % | ±% |
|---|---|---|---|---|
| Nationalist | David Oman | 3,860 | 60.6 | +5.4 |
| Labor | John Coustley | 2,509 | 39.4 | +12.7 |
| Total formal votes | | 6,369 | 99.3 | +0.8 |
| Informal votes | | 45 | 0.7 | −0.8 |
| Turnout | | 6,414 | 55.4 | −5.3 |
| Nationalist hold | | Swing | −8.2 | |

=== Hawthorn ===
1924 Victorian state election: Hawthorn
| Party | Candidate | Votes | % | ±% |
|---|---|---|---|---|
| Nationalist | William McPherson | 9,576 | 50.6 | −49.4 |
| Labor | Edward Cummins | 6,545 | 34.6 | +34.6 |
| Independent Liberal | Horace Mason | 2,812 | 14.8 | +14.8 |
| Total formal votes | | 18,933 | 98.6 | |
| Informal votes | | 275 | 1.4 | |
| Turnout | | 19,208 | 59.8 | |
Two-party-preferred result
| Nationalist | William McPherson | | 63.9 | −36.1 |
| Labor | Edward Cummins | | 36.1 | +36.1 |
| Nationalist hold | | Swing | N/A | |

- Two party preferred vote was estimated.

=== Jika Jika ===
1924 Victorian state election: Jika Jika
| Party | Candidate | Votes | % | ±% |
|---|---|---|---|---|
| Labor | John Cain | 14,927 | 65.2 | +10.7 |
| Nationalist | Philip Mayer | 7,949 | 34.8 | −10.7 |
| Total formal votes | | 22,876 | 99.7 | +0.1 |
| Informal votes | | 75 | 0.3 | −0.1 |
| Turnout | | 22,951 | 55.2 | +4.2 |
| Labor hold | | Swing | +10.7 | |

=== Kara Kara ===
1924 Victorian state election: Kara Kara
| Party | Candidate | Votes | % | ±% |
|---|---|---|---|---|
| Nationalist | John Pennington | unopposed | | |
| Nationalist hold | | Swing | | |

=== Korong ===
1924 Victorian state election: Korong
| Party | Candidate | Votes | % | ±% |
|---|---|---|---|---|
| Country | Isaac Weaver | 2,791 | 67.5 | +5.6 |
| Nationalist | John O'Brien | 1,342 | 32.5 | −5.6 |
| Total formal votes | | 4,133 | 99.7 | +0.3 |
| Informal votes | | 12 | 0.3 | −0.3 |
| Turnout | | 4,145 | 63.6 | −3.8 |
| Country hold | | Swing | +5.6 | |

=== Lowan ===
1924 Victorian state election: Lowan
| Party | Candidate | Votes | % | ±% |
|---|---|---|---|---|
| Country | Marcus Wettenhall | 2,959 | 42.9 | −7.3 |
| Nationalist | James Menzies | 2,400 | 34.8 | −14.8 |
| Country | Harold Glowrey | 1,152 | 16.7 | +16.7 |
| Nationalist | William Bolwell | 392 | 5.7 | +5.7 |
| Total formal votes | | 6,903 | 98.5 | +0.8 |
| Informal votes | | 107 | 1.5 | −0.8 |
| Turnout | | 7,010 | 66.9 | −2.8 |
Two-candidate-preferred result
| Country | Marcus Wettenhall | 3,877 | 56.2 | +6.0 |
| Nationalist | James Menzies | 3,026 | 43.8 | −6.0 |
| Country hold | | Swing | +6.0 | |

=== Maryborough ===
1924 Victorian state election: Maryborough
| Party | Candidate | Votes | % | ±% |
|---|---|---|---|---|
| Labor | George Frost | 3,207 | 68.3 | +12.3 |
| Independent Liberal | Thomas Richards | 1,488 | 31.7 | +31.7 |
| Total formal votes | | 4,695 | 99.4 | −0.2 |
| Informal votes | | 31 | 0.6 | +0.2 |
| Turnout | | 4,726 | 74.3 | −2.0 |
| Labor hold | | Swing | N/A | |

=== Melbourne ===
1924 Victorian state election: Melbourne
| Party | Candidate | Votes | % | ±% |
|---|---|---|---|---|
| Labor | Tom Hayes | 3,385 | 76.7 | −23.3 |
| Nationalist | Wilfred Kent Hughes | 1,030 | 23.3 | +23.3 |
| Total formal votes | | 4,415 | 99.5 | |
| Informal votes | | 23 | 0.5 | |
| Turnout | | 4,438 | 57.3 | |
| Labor hold | | Swing | N/A | |

=== Mornington ===
1924 Victorian state election: Mornington
| Party | Candidate | Votes | % | ±% |
|---|---|---|---|---|
| Labor | William Dowling | 3,733 | 41.2 | +41.2 |
| Country | Alfred Downward | 2,298 | 25.4 | −22.0 |
| Nationalist | Frederick Hagelthorn | 1,019 | 11.2 | −20.6 |
| Country | Milton Wettenhall | 843 | 9.3 | +9.3 |
| Independent | William Easton | 820 | 9.0 | +9.0 |
| Independent | Percy Thompson | 347 | 3.8 | +3.8 |
| Total formal votes | | 9,060 | 96.5 | −1.0 |
| Informal votes | | 328 | 3.5 | +1.0 |
| Turnout | | 9,388 | 55.0 | +7.1 |
Two-party-preferred result
| Country | Alfred Downward | 4,865 | 53.7 | +1.6 |
| Labor | William Dowling | 4,195 | 46.3 | +46.3 |
| Country hold | | Swing | N/A | |

=== North Melbourne ===
1924 Victorian state election: North Melbourne
| Party | Candidate | Votes | % | ±% |
|---|---|---|---|---|
| Labor | George Prendergast | unopposed | | |
| Labor hold | | Swing | | |

=== Ovens ===
1924 Victorian state election: Ovens
| Party | Candidate | Votes | % | ±% |
|---|---|---|---|---|
| Australian Liberal | Alfred Billson | 1,986 | 56.4 | +56.4 |
| Labor | John Price | 1,533 | 43.6 | +43.6 |
| Total formal votes | | 3,519 | 98.8 | |
| Informal votes | | 43 | 1.2 | |
| Turnout | | 3,562 | 73.0 | |
| Australian Liberal gain from Nationalist | | Swing | N/A | |

- Alfred Billson was the sitting Nationalist MP for Ovens.

=== Polwarth ===
1924 Victorian state election: Polwarth
| Party | Candidate | Votes | % | ±% |
|---|---|---|---|---|
| Nationalist | James McDonald | 4,112 | 56.1 | −3.2 |
| Labor | William Nichol | 3,217 | 43.9 | +3.2 |
| Total formal votes | | 7,329 | 99.7 | +0.3 |
| Informal votes | | 26 | 0.3 | −0.3 |
| Turnout | | 7,355 | 64.0 | −0.6 |
| Nationalist hold | | Swing | −3.2 | |

=== Port Fairy ===
1924 Victorian state election: Port Fairy
| Party | Candidate | Votes | % | ±% |
|---|---|---|---|---|
| Labor | Henry Bailey | unopposed | | |
| Labor hold | | Swing | | |

=== Port Melbourne ===
1924 Victorian state election: Port Melbourne
| Party | Candidate | Votes | % | ±% |
|---|---|---|---|---|
| Labor | James Murphy | unopposed | | |
| Labor hold | | Swing | | |

=== Prahran ===
1924 Victorian state election: Prahran
| Party | Candidate | Votes | % | ±% |
|---|---|---|---|---|
| Labor | Arthur Jackson | 6,316 | 51.6 | +2.6 |
| Nationalist | Richard Fetherston | 3,957 | 32.4 | −18.2 |
| Independent Liberal | Alfred Woodfull | 1,850 | 15.1 | +15.1 |
| Independent Labor | Harold Croughnan | 106 | 0.9 | +0.9 |
| Total formal votes | | 12,229 | 97.6 | −1.7 |
| Informal votes | | 307 | 2.4 | +1.7 |
| Turnout | | 12,536 | 64.5 | +9.7 |
Two-party-preferred result
| Labor | Arthur Jackson | | 53.5 | +4.1 |
| Nationalist | Richard Fetherston | | 46.5 | −4.1 |
| Labor gain from Nationalist | | Swing | +4.1 | |

- Two party preferred vote was estimated.

=== Richmond ===
1924 Victorian state election: Richmond
| Party | Candidate | Votes | % | ±% |
|---|---|---|---|---|
| Labor | Ted Cotter | unopposed | | |
| Labor hold | | Swing | | |

=== Rodney ===
1924 Victorian state election: Rodney
| Party | Candidate | Votes | % | ±% |
|---|---|---|---|---|
| Country | John Allan | 4,125 | 65.0 | +6.9 |
| Country | John Chanter | 2,216 | 35.0 | +35.0 |
| Total formal votes | | 6,341 | 99.3 | +0.2 |
| Informal votes | | 43 | 0.7 | −0.2 |
| Turnout | | 6,384 | 57.0 | −9.1 |
| Country hold | | Swing | N/A | |

=== St Kilda ===
1924 Victorian state election: St Kilda
| Party | Candidate | Votes | % | ±% |
|---|---|---|---|---|
| Nationalist | Frederic Eggleston | unopposed | | |
| Nationalist hold | | Swing | | |

=== Stawell and Ararat ===
1924 Victorian state election: Stawell and Ararat
| Party | Candidate | Votes | % | ±% |
|---|---|---|---|---|
| Nationalist | Richard Toutcher | 3,331 | 56.8 | −0.4 |
| Labor | Francis Brophy | 2,533 | 43.2 | +0.4 |
| Total formal votes | | 5,864 | 99.6 | +0.1 |
| Informal votes | | 21 | 0.4 | −0.1 |
| Turnout | | 5,885 | 74.4 | +5.7 |
| Nationalist hold | | Swing | −0.4 | |

=== Swan Hill ===
1924 Victorian state election: Swan Hill
| Party | Candidate | Votes | % | ±% |
|---|---|---|---|---|
| Country | Francis Old | 5,347 | 52.4 | −20.7 |
| Labor | Edward Nicholls | 3,187 | 31.2 | +31.2 |
| Nationalist | Ernest Gray | 1,663 | 16.3 | −10.6 |
| Total formal votes | | 10,197 | 98.0 | −0.9 |
| Informal votes | | 211 | 2.0 | +0.9 |
| Turnout | | 10,408 | 48.5 | 0.0 |
Two-party-preferred result
| Country | Francis Old | | 66.2 | −6.9 |
| Labor | Edward Nicholls | | 33.8 | +33.8 |
| Country hold | | Swing | N/A | |

- Two party preferred vote was estimated.

=== Toorak ===
1924 Victorian state election: Toorak
| Party | Candidate | Votes | % | ±% |
|---|---|---|---|---|
| Nationalist | Stanley Argyle | 7,741 | 66.9 | −33.1 |
| Labor | Charles Cope | 3,826 | 33.1 | +33.1 |
| Total formal votes | | 11,567 | 99.2 | |
| Informal votes | | 89 | 0.8 | |
| Turnout | | 11,656 | 47.7 | |
| Nationalist hold | | Swing | N/A | |

=== Upper Goulburn ===
1924 Victorian state election: Upper Goulburn
| Party | Candidate | Votes | % | ±% |
|---|---|---|---|---|
| Labor | John Minogue | 2,137 | 38.3 | +4.4 |
| Country | Edwin Mackrell | 1,889 | 33.8 | 0.0 |
| Nationalist | Robert McAlpin | 1,556 | 27.9 | −4.4 |
| Total formal votes | | 5,582 | 98.7 | +0.5 |
| Informal votes | | 73 | 1.3 | −0.5 |
| Turnout | | 5,655 | 72.9 | +7.8 |
Two-party-preferred result
| Country | Edwin Mackrell | 3,257 | 58.3 | −3.4 |
| Labor | John Minogue | 2,325 | 41.7 | +3.4 |
| Country hold | | Swing | −3.4 | |

=== Walhalla ===
1924 Victorian state election: Walhalla
| Party | Candidate | Votes | % | ±% |
|---|---|---|---|---|
| Nationalist | Samuel Barnes | 2,219 | 53.4 | −46.6 |
| Labor | James Bermingham | 1,936 | 46.6 | +46.6 |
| Total formal votes | | 4,155 | 99.5 | |
| Informal votes | | 22 | 0.5 | |
| Turnout | | 4,177 | 53.6 | |
| Nationalist hold | | Swing | N/A | |

=== Wangaratta ===
1924 Victorian state election: Wangaratta
| Party | Candidate | Votes | % | ±% |
|---|---|---|---|---|
| Country | John Bowser | unopposed | | |
| Country hold | | Swing | | |

=== Waranga ===
1924 Victorian state election: Waranga
| Party | Candidate | Votes | % | ±% |
|---|---|---|---|---|
| Nationalist | John Gordon | unopposed | | |
| Nationalist hold | | Swing | | |

=== Warrenheip ===
1924 Victorian state election: Warrenheip
| Party | Candidate | Votes | % | ±% |
|---|---|---|---|---|
| Labor | Edmond Hogan | unopposed | | |
| Labor hold | | Swing | | |

=== Warrnambool ===
1924 Victorian state election: Warrnambool
| Party | Candidate | Votes | % | ±% |
|---|---|---|---|---|
| Nationalist | James Deany | 3,188 | 50.1 | −10.1 |
| Independent Labor | Harold Lawson | 2,288 | 36.0 | +36.0 |
| Labor | Laurence Bolton | 888 | 13.9 | −25.9 |
| Total formal votes | | 6,364 | 99.3 | −0.2 |
| Informal votes | | 47 | 0.7 | +0.2 |
| Turnout | | 6,411 | 68.1 | +2.7 |
Two-party-preferred result
| Nationalist | James Deany | | 52.4 | −7.8 |
| Independent Labor | Harold Lawson | | 47.6 | +47.6 |
| Nationalist hold | | Swing | N/A | |

- Two candidate preferred vote was estimated.

=== Williamstown ===
1924 Victorian state election: Williamstown
| Party | Candidate | Votes | % | ±% |
|---|---|---|---|---|
| Labor | John Lemmon | unopposed | | |
| Labor hold | | Swing | | |

== See also ==
- 1924 Victorian state election
- Candidates of the 1924 Victorian state election
- Members of the Victorian Legislative Assembly, 1924–1927
