= Candidates of the 1917 Victorian state election =

The 1917 Victorian state election was held on 15 November 1917.

Since the previous election, the Liberal Party had absorbed pro-conscription Labor defectors and become the Nationalist Party. However, the Nationalists contested this election as three competing factions: Ministerialists, the supporters of Alexander Peacock's government; the "Economy Party", supporters of John Bowser; and the National Labor Party, for those ex-Labor members now supporting the anti-Labor side of politics.

== Retiring Members ==
=== Nationalist ===
- Robert McCutcheon MLA (St Kilda)
- James Membrey MLA (Jika Jika)

==== National Labor ====
- John Chatham MLA (Grenville)

== Legislative Assembly ==
Sitting members are shown in bold text. Successful candidates are highlighted in the relevant colour. Where there is possible confusion, an asterisk (*) is also used.

Electorate	Held by	Labor candidates	Nationalist candidates			VFU candidates	Other candidates
			Ministerial	Economy	National Labor		
Abbotsford	Labor	**Gordon Webber**					
Albert Park	Labor	**George Elmslie**		John Baragwanath			
Allandale	Nationalist		Sir Alexander Peacock	Walter Grose			
Ballarat East	Nationalist	Andrew McKissock	Robert McGregor				
Ballarat West	Nationalist			**Matthew Baird**			
Barwon	Nationalist			**James Farrer**; Duncan McLennan*		Lemuel Griffiths	
Benalla	Nationalist	Laurence Corboy		**John Carlisle***; Thomas Kennedy			
Benambra	Nationalist			**Henry Beardmore***; George Jephcott; Leslie Sambell			
Bendigo East	Labor	**Luke Clough**		Thomas Currie; Walter McRobert			
Bendigo West	Labor	Arthur Cook			**David Smith**		
Boroondara	Nationalist			Frederick Francis; Edmund Greenwood*; Walter Hiscock; **Sir Frank Madden**			
Borung	Nationalist		William Hutchinson			Edwin Reseigh	
Brighton	Nationalist	Arthur Roth		Frederick Leveson; **Oswald Snowball***			
Brunswick	Labor	**James Jewell**		John March			James Davis (Ind Nat)
Bulla	Nationalist			James Gilchrist; **Andrew Robertson***		James Cunningham	
Carlton	Labor	**Robert Solly**					
Castlemaine and Maldon	Nationalist		Harry Lawson				
Collingwood	Labor	**Martin Hannah**					
Dalhousie	Nationalist	Joseph O'Connor	Allan Cameron	Reginald Argyle; Alexander Wilson			
Dandenong	Nationalist			Frank Groves*; **William Keast**			
Daylesford	Nationalist	Joseph Hannigan	Donald McLeod				
Dundas	Nationalist	Bill Slater		Edward Dobson; **William Smith**			
Eaglehawk	Labor	**Tom Tunnecliffe**		Thomas Hicks		William Hill	
East Melbourne	Nationalist	Sydney Walker		**Alfred Farthing***; George Kemp			John Barrett (Temp)
Essendon	Labor	**Maurice Blackburn**		Thomas Ryan			
Evelyn	Nationalist		James Rouget	William Everard*; Reginald Kelly			
Fitzroy	Labor	**John Billson**					
Flemington	Labor	**Edward Warde**		Thomas Ivory			
Geelong	Nationalist	William Brownbill		**Robert Purnell**			
Gippsland East	Nationalist	Gordon Holmes	James Cameron	James Bayliss			
Gippsland North	Labor				**James McLachlan**		
Gippsland South	Nationalist		Thomas Livingston	Thomas McGalliard		James McQueen	
Gippsland West	Nationalist			**John Mackey**			
Glenelg	Nationalist	William Thomas	Hugh Campbell			Walter Watson	
Goulburn Valley	Nationalist			Thomas Lyons; **John Mitchell***			
Grenville	Labor	Frederick Hower		George Meudell; Henry Vernon		David Gibson	
Gunbower	Nationalist			**Henry Angus**			
Hampden	Nationalist	Patrick McMahon		**David Oman**			
Hawthorn	Nationalist			**William McPherson**			
Jika Jika	Nationalist	**John Cain**		Samuel Dennis; Arthur May			George Jewell (Ind Lab)
Kara Kara	Nationalist		John Pennington			John Hall	
Korong	Nationalist			**Achilles Gray**		Isaac Weaver	
Lowan	Nationalist			**James Menzies**			
Maryborough	Labor	Thomas Jude		Robert Laidlaw	**Alfred Outtrim**		
Melbourne	Labor	**Alexander Rogers**					
Mornington	Nationalist			Robert Anderson; **Alfred Downward***			
North Melbourne	Labor	**George Prendergast**		John Vroland			
Ovens	Nationalist	William Gribble		**Alfred Billson***; Erle Evans			
Polwarth	Nationalist	Edward Smith		Edgar Churches; John Hancock; **James McDonald***			
Port Fairy	Labor	**Henry Bailey**		Alfred Noar			
Port Melbourne	Labor	James Murphy		James Crichton			Henry Sanderson (Ind Lab); **Owen Sinclair** (Ind Lab)
Prahran	Nationalist	Harry Smith		**Donald Mackinnon**			
Richmond	Labor	**Ted Cotter**					
Rodney	Nationalist		Hugh McKenzie			John Allan	William Day (Temp)
St Kilda	Nationalist	George McGowan		John Macfarlan; Agar Wynne*			
Stawell and Ararat	Nationalist	William Tibbles		**Richard Toutcher**			
Swan Hill	Nationalist		John Gray			Percy Stewart	Hugh McClelland (Ind VFU)
Toorak	Nationalist			**Norman Bayles***; Alfred Darroch			
Upper Goulburn	Nationalist			Thomas Hunt; **Malcolm McKenzie***			
Walhalla	Nationalist	Edward Nichols	Samuel Barnes				
Wangaratta	Nationalist			**John Bowser**			
Waranga	Nationalist	Leon Villiers		**John Gordon**			
Warrenheip	Labor	**Edmond Hogan**		Garnett Durham			
Warrnambool	Nationalist	James McMeel		**James Deany**			
Williamstown	Labor	**John Lemmon**		George Greenslade			

== See also ==
- 1916 Victorian Legislative Council election
