= Candidates of the 1924 Victorian state election =

The 1924 Victorian state election was held on 26 June 1924.

== Retiring Members ==
=== Labor ===
- Alexander Rogers MLA (Melbourne)

=== Nationalist ===
- David Smith MLA (Bendigo West)

== Legislative Assembly ==
Sitting members are shown in bold text. Successful candidates are highlighted in the relevant colour. Where there is possible confusion, an asterisk (*) is also used.

Electorate	Held by	Labor candidates	Nationalist candidates	Country candidates	Other candidates
Abbotsford	Labor	**Gordon Webber**			
Albert Park	Labor	**Arthur Wallace**	John Atkinson		Thomas Craine (Ind Lib); Selwyn Neale (Ind Lib)
Allandale	Nationalist		**Sir Alexander Peacock**		
Ballarat East	Nationalist	William McAdam	**Robert McGregor**		Alfred Elliott (Ind Lab)
Ballarat West	Nationalist	Mark Lazarus	**Matthew Baird**		
Barwon	Nationalist	Alicia Katz	**Edward Morley**		
Benalla	Country		Alexander Mitchell	**John Carlisle**	
Benambra	Nationalist		**Henry Beardmore**	John Hall	
Bendigo East	Labor	**Luke Clough**	John Michelsen		
Bendigo West	Nationalist	Arthur Cook	Edwin Ham		
Boroondara	Nationalist		**Edmund Greenwood**		Philip Jacobs (Ind Lib)
Borung	Country			**David Allison***; George Clyne; Edwin Reseigh	
Brighton	Nationalist		Henry Crowther		**Oswald Snowball** (Lib)
Brunswick	Labor	**James Jewell**			
Bulla	Nationalist	Ralph Hjorth	**Andrew Robertson**	Henry Pickering	
Carlton	Labor	**Robert Solly**			
Castlemaine and Maldon	Nationalist	William Webber	**Harry Lawson**		
Collingwood	Labor	**Tom Tunnecliffe**			
Dalhousie	Labor	**Reg Pollard**	Angus McNab	Gerald McKenna	
Dandenong	Nationalist	Roy Beardsworth	**Frank Groves**		Henry Harris (Ind)
Daylesford	Nationalist	James McDonald	**Roderick McLeod**		
Dundas	Labor	**Bill Slater**	Albert Borella		
Eaglehawk	Country		Albert Holdsworth	**Albert Dunstan**	
East Melbourne	Nationalist	George Hooper			William Carnegie (Ind); **Alfred Farthing*** (Lib)
Essendon	Nationalist	Frank Keane	**Thomas Ryan**		
Evelyn	Nationalist		Herbert Hewitt		**William Everard** (Lib)
Fitzroy	Labor	**John Billson**			
Flemington	Labor	**Edward Warde**			
Geelong	Labor	**William Brownbill**	Thomas Maltby		
Gippsland East	Country			**Albert Lind**	
Gippsland North	Independent	David O'Donnell		Matthew Boland	**James McLachlan** (Ind Lab)
Gippsland South	Nationalist		**Walter West**		
Gippsland West	Country	John McKellar	Ernest Bremner	**Arthur Walter**	
Glenelg	Labor	**William Thomas**	Hugh MacLeod	Charles Waters	
Goulburn Valley	Country			**Murray Bourchier**	
Grenville	Labor	**Arthur Hughes**	George Burchett	David Gibson	
Gunbower	Nationalist			William McCann	**Henry Angus** (Lib)
Hampden	Nationalist	John Coustley	**David Oman**		
Hawthorn	Nationalist	Edward Cummins	**Sir William McPherson**		Horace Mason (Ind Lib)
Jika Jika	Labor	**John Cain**	Philip Mayer		
Kara Kara	Nationalist		**John Pennington**		
Korong	Country		John O'Brien	**Isaac Weaver**	
Lowan	Country		William Bolwell; James Menzies	Harold Glowrey; **Marcus Wettenhall***	
Maryborough	Labor	**George Frost**			Thomas Richards (Ind Lib)
Melbourne	Labor	Tom Hayes	Wilfred Kent Hughes		
Mornington	Country	William Dowling	Frederick Hagelthorn	**Alfred Downward***; Milton Wettenhall	William Easton (Ind); Percy Thompson (Ind)
North Melbourne	Labor	**George Prendergast**			
Ovens	Nationalist	John Price			**Alfred Billson** (Lib)
Polwarth	Nationalist	William Nichol	**James McDonald**		
Port Fairy	Labor	**Henry Bailey**			
Port Melbourne	Labor	**James Murphy**			
Prahran	Nationalist	Arthur Jackson	**Richard Fetherston**		Harold Croughnan (Ind Lab); Alfred Woodfull (Ind Lib)
Richmond	Labor	**Ted Cotter**			
Rodney	Country			**John Allan***; John Chanter	
St Kilda	Nationalist		**Frederic Eggleston**		
Stawell and Ararat	Nationalist	Francis Brophy	**Richard Toutcher**		
Swan Hill	Country	Edward Nicholls	Ernest Gray	**Francis Old**	
Toorak	Nationalist	Charles Cope	**Stanley Argyle**		
Upper Goulburn	Country	John Minogue	Robert McAlpin	**Edwin Mackrell**	
Walhalla	Nationalist	James Bermingham	**Samuel Barnes**		
Wangaratta	Country			**John Bowser**	
Waranga	Nationalist		**John Gordon**		
Warrenheip	Labor	**Edmond Hogan**			
Warrnambool	Nationalist	Laurence Bolton	**James Deany**		Harold Lawson (Ind Lab)
Williamstown	Labor	**John Lemmon**			

== See also ==
- 1925 Victorian Legislative Council election
