= Electoral results for the district of Kara Kara =

Australian district election results

This is a list of electoral results for the electoral district of Kara Kara in Victorian state elections.

== Members for Kara Kara ==
First Incarnation 1877–1927
Member	Party	Term
John Dow	None	1877 – 1893
Andrew Anderson	None	1893^{#} – 1897
Sir Peter McBride	None	1897^{#} – 1913
John Pennington	Liberal	1913^{#} – 1917
John Hall	VFU	1917 – 1918
John Pennington	Nationalist	1918 – 1927

Kara Kara was abolished in 1927, the Electoral district of Kara Kara and Borung was created 1927 and existed until 1945. Pennington was member for Kara Kara and Borung from 1927 to 1935.

Second Incarnation 1955–1976
Member	Party	Term
Keith Turnbull	Liberal and Country	1955 – 1964
Bill Phelan	Country	1964 – 1970
Esmond Curnow	Labor	1970 – 1976

1. = by-election

== Election results ==
=== Elections in the 1970s ===
1973 Victorian state election: Kara Kara
Party	Candidate	Votes	%	±%
Labor	Esmond Curnow	7,330	44.0	+9.7
Liberal	John Radford	4,691	28.1	+1.0
Country	Roderick Boyd	3,739	22.4	−7.0
Democratic Labor	Robert O'Connor	917	5.5	−3.8
Total formal votes		16,677	98.3	0.0
Informal votes		287	1.7	0.0
Turnout		16,964	96.1	−0.9
Two-party-preferred result
Labor	Esmond Curnow	8,662	51.9	−3.3
Liberal	John Radford	8,015	48.1	+3.3
Labor hold		Swing	−3.3	

1970 Victorian state election: Kara Kara
Party	Candidate	Votes	%	±%
Labor	Esmond Curnow	5,508	34.3	+7.5
Country	Bill Phelan	4,721	29.4	−7.4
Liberal	Bruce Thornhill	4,352	27.1	+0.6
Democratic Labor	Robert O'Connor	1,500	9.3	−0.5
Total formal votes		16,081	98.3	−0.6
Informal votes		282	1.7	+0.6
Turnout		16,363	97.0	+0.7
Two-party-preferred result
Labor	Esmond Curnow	8,873	55.2	+55.2
Liberal	Bruce Thornhill	7,208	44.8	+7.4
Labor gain from Country		Swing	N/A	

=== Elections in the 1960s ===
1967 Victorian state election: Kara Kara
Party	Candidate	Votes	%	±%
Country	Bill Phelan	6,078	36.8	+8.0
Labor	George Jeffs	4,429	26.8	+2.0
Liberal	Alexander Lee	4,379	26.5	−9.9
Democratic Labor	Bruno D'elia	1,620	9.8	−0.2
Total formal votes		16,506	98.9	
Informal votes		191	1.1	
Turnout		16,697	96.3	
Two-party-preferred result
Country	Bill Phelan	11,393	69.0	
Labor	George Jeffs	5,113	31.0	
Two-candidate-preferred result
Country	Bill Phelan	10,325	62.6	+9.6
Liberal	Alexander Lee	6,181	37.4	−9.6
Country hold		Swing	+9.6	

1964 Victorian state election: Kara Kara
Party	Candidate	Votes	%	±%
Liberal and Country	Keith Turnbull	7,161	38.7	+5.2
Country	Bill Phelan	5,065	27.4	+1.1
Labor	George Jeffs	4,534	24.5	−4.1
Democratic Labor	Bruno D'Elia	1,736	9.4	−2.1
Total formal votes		18,496	98.9	+0.1
Informal votes		210	1.1	−0.1
Turnout		18,706	96.4	0.0
Two-candidate-preferred result
Country	Bill Phelan	9,482	51.3	+51.3
Liberal and Country	Keith Turnbull	9,014	48.7	−15.1
Country gain from Liberal and Country		Swing	N/A	

1961 Victorian state election: Kara Kara
Party	Candidate	Votes	%	±%
Liberal and Country	Keith Turnbull	6,224	33.5	−8.3
Labor	Cyril Sudholz	5,314	28.6	−1.3
Country	Bill Phelan	4,902	26.3	+8.8
Democratic Labor	Vincent Gervasoni	2,144	11.5	+0.7
Total formal votes		18,584	98.8	−0.2
Informal votes		225	1.2	+0.2
Turnout		18,809	96.4	−0.4
Two-party-preferred result
Liberal and Country	Keith Turnbull	11,864	63.8	−0.4
Labor	Cyril Sudholz	6,246	31.7	+0.4
Liberal and Country hold		Swing	−0.4	

=== Elections in the 1950s ===
1958 Victorian state election: Kara Kara
Party	Candidate	Votes	%	±%
Liberal and Country	Keith Turnbull	8,007	41.8	
Labor	Cyril Sudholz	5,714	29.9	
Country	Allen Reseigh	3,347	17.5	
Democratic Labor	Gerard Gilders	2,071	10.8	
Total formal votes		19,139	99.0	
Informal votes		199	1.0	
Turnout		19,338	96.8	
Two-party-preferred result
Liberal and Country	Keith Turnbull	12,286	64.2	
Labor	Cyril Sudholz	6,853	35.8	
Liberal and Country hold		Swing		

1955 Victorian state election: Kara Kara
Party	Candidate	Votes	%	±%
Liberal and Country	Keith Turnbull	9,233	54.8	
Country	Ian McCann	7,605	45.2	
Total formal votes		16,838	97.1	
Informal votes		509	2.9	
Turnout		17,347	95.9	
Liberal and Country hold		Swing		

=== Elections in the 1920s ===
1924 Victorian state election: Kara Kara
Party	Candidate	Votes	%	±%
Nationalist	John Pennington	unopposed		
Nationalist hold		Swing		

1921 Victorian state election: Kara Kara
Party	Candidate	Votes	%	±%
Nationalist	John Pennington	2,436	48.8	−5.7
Victorian Farmers	Alexander Cameron	1,583	31.7	−13.8
Labor	Alfred Pearce	973	19.5	+19.5
Total formal votes		4,992	99.1	+0.6
Informal votes		48	0.9	−0.6
Turnout		5,040	82.9	+4.3
Two-candidate-preferred result
Nationalist	John Pennington	2,675	53.6	−0.9
Victorian Farmers	Alexander Cameron	2,317	46.4	+0.9
Nationalist hold		Swing	−0.9	

1920 Victorian state election: Kara Kara
Party	Candidate	Votes	%	±%
Nationalist	John Pennington	2,679	54.5	+4.3
Victorian Farmers	John Hall	2,236	45.5	−4.3
Total formal votes		4,915	98.5	+3.4
Informal votes		73	1.5	−3.4
Turnout		4,988	78.6	+9.4
Nationalist hold		Swing	+4.3	

=== Elections in the 1910s ===
1917 Victorian state election: Kara Kara
Party	Candidate	Votes	%	±%
Nationalist	John Pennington	2,245	50.2	−15.2
Victorian Farmers	John Hall	2,230	49.8	+49.8
Total formal votes		4,475	95.1	−3.1
Informal votes		232	4.9	+3.1
Turnout		4,707	69.2	−4.6
Nationalist hold		Swing	N/A	

1914 Victorian state election: Kara Kara
Party	Candidate	Votes	%	±%
Liberal	John Pennington	3,545	65.4	−34.6
Labor	Richard Taafe	1,872	34.6	+34.6
Total formal votes		5,275	98.2	
Informal votes		232	1.8	
Turnout		5,507	73.8	
Liberal hold		Swing	N/A	

1911 Victorian state election: Kara Kara
Party	Candidate	Votes	%	±%
Liberal	Peter McBride	unopposed		
Liberal hold		Swing		
