= Electoral results for the district of Gippsland North =

List of electoral results for the electoral district of Gippsland North

This is a list of electoral results for the electoral district of Gippsland North in Victorian state elections.

== Members for Gippsland North ==
One member initially, two from 1877, One member again from 1889 when the new Electoral district of Gippsland Central was created.

North Gipps Land (Two members 1877–1889)
Member 1	Term		
John Johnson (Knud Olai Boe)	Oct 1859 – July 1861		
John Everard	Aug 1861 – Aug 1861^{[d]}		
George Mackay	Nov 1861^{[b]} – Apr 1864		
John Everard	Apr 1864^{[b]} – Aug 1864		
William Pearson, Sr.	Nov 1864 – Dec 1867		
Frederick Leopold Smyth	Mar 1868 – Mar? 1875		
James McKean	May 1875^{[b]} – July 1876^{[x]}	Member 2	Term
Charles Gavan Duffy	Aug 1876^{[b]} – Feb 1880	Frederick Leopold Smyth	May 1877 – Feb 1880
Allan McLean	May 1880 – Mar 1889	James McKean	May 1880 – Feb 1883
Allan McLean	May 1880 – Mar 1889	Albert Harris	Feb 1883 – Mar 1889

Single Member District
Member	Party	Term
Allan McLean		1889 – 1901
Hubert Keogh		1901 – 1908
James McLachlan	Labor	1908 – 1916
James McLachlan	National Labor	1916 – 1917
James McLachlan	Independent	1917 – 1938
Alexander Borthwick	Country	1938 – 1942
Bill Fulton	Country	1942 – 1945
James Johns	Labor	1945 – 1947
Bill Fulton	Country	1947 – 1952
Hector Stoddart	Labor	1952 – 1955

== Election results ==
=== Elections in the 1950s ===
1952 Victorian state election: Gippsland North
Party	Candidate	Votes	%	±%
Labor	Hector Stoddart	8,840	52.5	+4.2
Country	Bill Fulton	7,992	47.5	+16.1
Total formal votes		16,832	99.0	−0.1
Informal votes		169	1.0	+0.1
Turnout		17,001	92.4	+0.1
Labor gain from Country		Swing	+2.9	

1950 Victorian state election: Gippsland North
Party	Candidate	Votes	%	±%
Labor	James Johns	7,179	48.3	+0.5
Country	Bill Fulton	4,658	31.4	−20.8
Liberal and Country	Donald Fowler	3,018	20.3	+20.3
Total formal votes		14,855	99.1	−0.2
Informal votes		141	0.9	+0.2
Turnout		14,996	92.3	−1.9
Two-party-preferred result
Country	Bill Fulton	7,487	50.4	−1.8
Labor	James Johns	7,368	49.6	+1.8
Country hold		Swing	−1.8	

=== Elections in the 1940s ===
1947 Victorian state election: Gippsland North
Party	Candidate	Votes	%	±%
Country	Bill Fulton	6,880	52.2	+28.6
Labor	James Johns	6,304	47.8	−2.5
Total formal votes		13,184	99.3	+0.8
Informal votes		97	0.7	−0.8
Turnout		13,281	94.2	
Country gain from Labor		Swing	N/A	

1945 Victorian state election: Gippsland North
Party	Candidate	Votes	%	±%
Labor	James Johns	5,807	50.3	
Country	Bill Fulton	2,728	23.6	
Country	William Moncur	2,499	21.6	
Independent	David White	506	4.4	
Total formal votes		11,540	98.5	
Informal votes		177	1.5	
Turnout		11,717	89.9	
Labor gain from Country		Swing		

- Preferences were not distributed.

1943 Victorian state election: Gippsland North
Party	Candidate	Votes	%	±%
Country	Bill Fulton	5,575	57.4	+11.7
Labor	Reuben Basham	4,141	42.6	+8.8
Total formal votes		9,716	99.0	+0.1
Informal votes		93	1.0	−0.1
Turnout		9,809	87.7	−4.4
Country hold		Swing	−2.5	

1942 Gippsland North state by-election
Party	Candidate	Votes	%	±%
Labor	Reuben Basham	3,895	42.2	+8.4
Country	Bill Fulton	3,704	40.1	−5.6
Independent	Roy Mawley	1,626	17.6	+17.6
Total formal votes		9,225	98.8	−0.1
Informal votes		108	1.2	+0.1
Turnout		9,333	82.9	−9.2
Two-party-preferred result
Country	Bill Fulton	4,946	53.6	−6.3
Labor	Reuben Basham	4,279	46.4	+6.3
Country hold		Swing	−6.3	

1940 Victorian state election: Gippsland North
Party	Candidate	Votes	%	±%
Country	Alexander Borthwick	4,592	45.7	+24.2
Labor	Albert Ainsworth	3,402	33.8	+14.8
Liberal Country	Stephen Ashton	2,060	20.5	+20.5
Total formal votes		10,054	98.9	0.0
Informal votes		108	1.1	0.0
Turnout		10,162	92.1	−2.0
Two-party-preferred result
Country	Alexander Borthwick	6,027	59.9	+11.9
Labor	Albert Ainsworth	4,027	40.1	+40.1
Country gain from Independent		Swing	N/A	

=== Elections in the 1930s ===
1938 Gippsland North state by-election
Party	Candidate	Votes	%	±%
Labor	Michael Cullinan	3,086	30.3	+11.3
Country	Alexander Borthwick	3,079	30.2	+8.7
Independent	Archibald Gilchrist	1,720	16.9	+16.9
United Australia	Donald Manson	1,714	16.8	+16.8
Independent Labor	Jack Glover	578	5.7	+5.7
Total formal votes		10,356	98.3	−0.6
Informal votes		175	1.7	+0.6
Turnout		10,531	94.1	0.0
Two-party-preferred result
Country	Alexander Borthwick	6,130	60.3	+12.3
Labor	Michael Cullinan	4,047	39.7	+39.7
Country gain from Independent		Swing	N/A	

1937 Victorian state election: Gippsland North
Party	Candidate	Votes	%	±%
Independent	James McLachlan	4,038	38.8	−23.6
Country	William Heath	2,239	21.5	−0.9
Independent	Archibald Gilchrist	2,164	20.8	+20.8
Labor	Alexander McAdam	1,977	19.0	+19.0
Total formal votes		10,418	98.9	+0.3
Informal votes		113	1.1	−0.3
Turnout		10,531	94.1	−1.3
Two-candidate-preferred result
Independent	James McLachlan	5,418	52.0	
Country	William Heath	5,000	48.0	
Independent hold		Swing	N/A	

1935 Victorian state election: Gippsland North
Party	Candidate	Votes	%	±%
Independent	James McLachlan	6,416	62.4	+3.8
Country	William Kelly	2,304	22.4	−0.2
United Australia	Stephen Ashton	1,563	15.2	−3.6
Total formal votes		10,283	98.6	−0.5
Informal votes		144	1.4	+0.5
Turnout		10,427	95.4	+1.3
Independent hold		Swing	N/A	

- Preferences were not distributed.

1932 Victorian state election: Gippsland North
Party	Candidate	Votes	%	±%
Independent	James McLachlan	5,859	58.6	−41.4
Country	Rowland Harrison	2,266	22.6	+22.6
United Australia	Stephen Ashton	1,877	18.8	+18.8
Total formal votes		10,002	99.1	
Informal votes		93	0.9	
Turnout		10,095	94.1	
Two-candidate-preferred result
Independent	James McLachlan		60.4	
Country	Rowland Harrison		39.6	
Independent hold		Swing	N/A	

- Preferences were estimated.

=== Elections in the 1920s ===
1929 Victorian state election: Gippsland North
Party	Candidate	Votes	%	±%
Independent	James McLachlan	unopposed		
Independent hold		Swing		

1927 Victorian state election: Gippsland North
Party	Candidate	Votes	%	±%
Independent	James McLachlan	7,655	84.3	
Country	John Buchan	1,419	15.6	
Total formal votes		9,063	98.9	
Informal votes		105	1.1	
Turnout		9,168	92.0	
Independent hold		Swing		

1924 Victorian state election: Gippsland North
Party	Candidate	Votes	%	±%
Independent Labor	James McLachlan	4,533	70.6	−7.3
Labor	David O'Donnell	1,401	21.8	−0.3
Country	Matthew Boland	484	7.5	+7.5
Total formal votes		6,481	99.0	−0.2
Informal votes		68	1.0	+0.2
Turnout		6,486	68.0	+8.8
Two-candidate-preferred result
Independent Labor	James McLachlan		77.9	0.0
Labor	David O'Donnell		22.1	0.0
Independent Labor hold		Swing	0.0	

- Two candidate preferred vote was estimated.

1921 Victorian state election: Gippsland North
Party	Candidate	Votes	%	±%
Independent	James McLachlan	4,171	77.9	+4.2
Labor	James Bermingham	1,183	22.1	+22.1
Total formal votes		5,354	99.2	+5.2
Informal votes		43	0.8	−5.2
Turnout		5,397	59.2	−10.8
Independent hold		Swing	N/A	

1920 Victorian state election: Gippsland North
Party	Candidate	Votes	%	±%
Independent	James McLachlan	4,436	73.7	
Independent	Anthony Brennan	1,583	26.3	+26.3
Total formal votes		6,019	94.0	
Informal votes		382	6.0	
Turnout		6,401	70.0	
Independent gain from National Labor		Swing	N/A	

=== Elections in the 1910s ===
1917 Victorian state election: Gippsland North
Party	Candidate	Votes	%	±%
National Labor	James McLachlan	unopposed		
National Labor gain from Labor		Swing	N/A	

1914 Victorian state election: Gippsland North
Party	Candidate	Votes	%	±%
Labor	James McLachlan	3,622	65.3	+7.1
Liberal	Francis Minchin	1,121	20.2	−21.6
Liberal	Walter Lyon	802	14.5	+14.5
Total formal votes		5,545	98.3	−0.5
Informal votes		95	1.7	+0.5
Turnout		5,640	60.0	−11.1
Two-party-preferred result
Labor	James McLachlan		66.7	+8.5
Liberal	Francis Minchin		33.3	−8.5
Labor hold		Swing	+8.5	

- Two party preferred vote was estimated.

1911 Victorian state election: Gippsland North
Party	Candidate	Votes	%	±%
Labor	James McLachlan	3,366	58.2	+13.8
Liberal	William Trenwith	2,422	41.8	+0.7
Total formal votes		5,788	98.8	−0.2
Turnout		5,861	71.1	+8.4
Labor hold		Swing	N/A	
