= Electoral results for the district of Daylesford =

Australian election results

This is a list of electoral results for the electoral district of Daylesford in Victorian state elections.

== Members for Daylesford ==
Member	Party	Term
James Wheeler	Unaligned	1889–1900
Donald McLeod	Liberal	1900–1917
Donald McLeod	Nationalist	1917–1923
James McDonald	Labor	1923*
Roderick McLeod	Nationalist	1923–1924
James McDonald	Labor	1924–1927

- In the 1923 by-election, James McDonald of Labor was initially declared the winner, but a later recount established that Roderick McLeod had won.

== Election results ==
=== Elections in the 1920s ===
1924 Victorian state election: Daylesford
Party	Candidate	Votes	%	±%
Labor	James McDonald	2,668	52.3	+10.4
Nationalist	Roderick McLeod	2,435	47.7	−10.4
Total formal votes		5,103	99.7	+0.1
Informal votes		17	0.3	−0.1
Turnout		5,120	82.8	+20.7
Labor gain from Nationalist		Swing	+10.4	

1923 Daylesford state by-election
Party	Candidate	Votes	%	±%
Labor	James McDonald	1,933	45.2	+3.3
Nationalist	Roderick McLeod	1,696	39.7	−18.4
Country	Edward Trembath	645	15.1	+15.1
Total formal votes		4,274	98.6	−1.0
Informal votes		62	1.4	+1.0
Turnout		4,336	68.8	+6.7
Two-party-preferred result
Nationalist	Roderick McLeod	2,125	50.1	−8.0
Labor	James McDonald	2,120	49.9	+8.0
Nationalist hold		Swing	−8.0	

- The initial result of 2,138 to McDonald and 2,136 to McLeod was overturned, and McLeod was awarded the seat.

1921 Victorian state election: Daylesford
Party	Candidate	Votes	%	±%
Nationalist	Donald McLeod	2,300	58.1	−5.2
Labor	James McDonald	1,657	41.9	+41.9
Total formal votes		3,957	99.6	+3.8
Informal votes		18	0.4	−3.8
Turnout		3,975	62.1	−1.1
Nationalist hold		Swing	N/A	

1920 Victorian state election: Daylesford
Party	Candidate	Votes	%	±%
Nationalist	Donald McLeod	2,433	63.2	+7.3
Nationalist	Henry Taylor	1,419	36.8	+36.8
Total formal votes		3,852	95.8	−1.1
Informal votes		171	4.2	+1.1
Turnout		4,023	63.2	−6.2
Nationalist hold		Swing	N/A	

=== Elections in the 1910s ===
1917 Victorian state election: Daylesford
Party	Candidate	Votes	%	±%
Nationalist	Donald McLeod	2,530	55.9	−10.2
Labor	Joseph Hannigan	1,998	44.1	+44.1
Total formal votes		4,528	96.9	−1.6
Informal votes		147	3.1	+1.6
Turnout		4,675	69.4	+5.3
Nationalist hold		Swing	N/A	

1914 Victorian state election: Daylesford
Party	Candidate	Votes	%	±%
Liberal	Donald McLeod	3,011	66.1	+12.0
Independent	Morton Dunlop	1,547	33.9	+33.9
Total formal votes		4,558	98.5	−0.4
Informal votes		68	1.5	+0.4
Turnout		4,626	64.1	−23.3
Liberal hold		Swing	N/A	

1911 Victorian state election: Daylesford
Party	Candidate	Votes	%	±%
Liberal	Donald McLeod	3,102	54.1	+5.6
Labor	John Hannan	2,637	45.9	+16.6
Total formal votes		5,739	98.9	−0.5
Informal votes		65	1.1	+0.5
Turnout		5,804	78.4	+14.3
Liberal hold		Swing	N/A	
