= Electoral results for the district of Grenville =

Victoria, Australia, district election results

This is a list of electoral results for the electoral district of Grenville in Victorian state elections.

== Members for Grenville ==
Two members initially, one from 1904.

Member 1	Term	Member 2 (until 1904)	Term
Robert Gillespie	Oct 1859 – Jul 1861	Richard Henry Lock	Oct 1859 – Jul 1861
Robert Gillespie	Aug 1861 – Mar 1862	Alfred Arthur O'Connor	Aug 1861 – Aug 1864
Mark Pope^{[b]}	Mar 1862 – Dec 1865	Thomas Randall	Nov 1864 – Dec 1865
Henry Henty	Feb 1866 – Dec 1867	Sir Francis Murphy	Feb 1866 – Jan 1871
Thomas Russell	Mar 1868 – Jan 1873	Sir Francis Murphy	Feb 1866 – Jan 1871
Thomas Russell	Mar 1868 – Jan 1873	William Clarke	Apr 1871 – Apr 1877
John Montgomery^{[b]}	May 1873 – Mar 1874	William Clarke	Apr 1871 – Apr 1877
Mark Pope	May 1874 – Jul 1874 ^{[d]}	William Clarke	Apr 1871 – Apr 1877
Richard Henry Lock	Aug 1874 – Apr 1877	William Clarke	Apr 1871 – Apr 1877
John Bird	May 1877 – Feb 1880	David Davies	May 1877 – Jun 1894
Alexander Young	May 1880 – Sep 1894	David Davies	May 1877 – Jun 1894
George Russell^{[b]}	July 1894 – Apr 1900	David Kerr	Oct 1894 – Sep 1897
George Russell^{[b]}	July 1894 – Apr 1900	Michael Stapleton	Oct 1897 – Nov 1899
James Sadler^{[b]}	June 1900 – Aug 1902	David Kerr^{[b]}	Dec 1899 – May 1904
Austin Austin	Oct 1902 – May 1904	David Kerr^{[b]}	Dec 1899 – May 1904

Single Member District 1904–1927
Member	Party	Term
Charles McGrath	Labor	1904–1913
John Chatham^{[b]}	Labor	1913–1916
John Chatham^{[b]}	Independent	1916–1917
David Gibson	VFU	1917–1921
Arthur Hughes	Labor	1921–1927

^{[b]} = elected in a by-election
^{[d]} = died in office

== Election results ==
=== Elections in the 1920s ===
1924 Victorian state election: Grenville
Party	Candidate	Votes	%	±%
Labor	Arthur Hughes	1,735	54.8	+10.2
Country	David Gibson	792	25.0	+0.7
Nationalist	George Burchett	638	20.2	−10.1
Total formal votes		3,165	98.5	−0.5
Informal votes		47	1.5	+0.5
Turnout		3,212	75.5	+0.6
Two-party-preferred result
Labor	Arthur Hughes		56.8	+1.7
Country	David Gibson		43.2	+43.2
Labor hold		Swing	+1.7	

- Two party preferred vote was estimated.

1921 Victorian state election: Grenville
Party	Candidate	Votes	%	±%
Labor	Arthur Hughes	1,593	44.6	−2.1
Nationalist	George Turner	1,111	31.1	+31.1
Victorian Farmers	David Gibson	868	24.3	−29.0
Total formal votes		3,572	99.0	+3.3
Informal votes		36	1.0	−3.3
Turnout		3,608	74.9	−6.5
Two-party-preferred result
Labor	Arthur Hughes	1,968	55.1	+8.4
Nationalist	George Turner	1,604	44.9	+44.9
Labor gain from Victorian Farmers		Swing	N/A	

1920 Victorian state election: Grenville
Party	Candidate	Votes	%	±%
Victorian Farmers	David Gibson	2,048	53.3	+25.2
Labor	James Scullin	1,792	46.7	+4.3
Total formal votes		3,627	95.7	−2.4
Informal votes		174	4.3	+2.4
Turnout		4,014	81.4	+13.6
Victorian Farmers hold		Swing	+0.6	

=== Elections in the 1910s ===
1917 Victorian state election: Grenville
Party	Candidate	Votes	%	±%
Labor	Frederick Hower	1,538	42.4	−16.3
Victorian Farmers	David Gibson	1,021	28.1	+28.1
Nationalist	Henry Vernon	816	22.5	−18.8
Nationalist	George Meudell	252	7.0	+7.0
Total formal votes		3,627	98.1	+0.2
Informal votes		72	1.9	−0.2
Turnout		3,699	67.8	−1.3
Two-party-preferred result
Victorian Farmers	David Gibson	1,911	52.7	
Labor	Frederick Hower	1,716	47.3	
Victorian Farmers gain from Labor		Swing	N/A	

1914 Victorian state election: Grenville
Party	Candidate	Votes	%	±%
Labor	John Chatham	2,496	58.7	−5.9
Liberal	Nicholas Howell	1,758	41.3	+5.9
Total formal votes		4,254	97.9	−0.7
Informal votes		92	2.1	+0.7
Turnout		4,346	69.1	−2.9
Labor hold		Swing	−5.9	

1911 Victorian state election: Grenville
Party	Candidate	Votes	%	±%
Labor	Charles McGrath	3,168	64.6	−7.4
Liberal	David Poynton	1,738	35.4	+7.4
Total formal votes		4,906	98.6	−0.2
Informal votes		71	1.4	+0.2
Turnout		4,977	72.0	+8.8
Labor hold		Swing	−7.4	
