= Electoral results for the district of Glenelg (Victoria) =

Australian district election results

This is a list of electoral results for the electoral district of Glenelg in Victorian state elections.

== Members for Glenelg ==
Member	Party	Term
Ewen Cameron	Unaligned	1904–1906
Hugh Campbell	Liberal	1906–1917
Hugh Campbell	Nationalist	1917–1920
William Thomas	Labor	1920–1924
Ernie Bond	Labor	1924–1927

== Election results ==
=== Elections in the 1920s ===
1924 Glenelg state by-election
Party	Candidate	Votes	%	±%
Labor	Ernie Bond	4,066	55.8	+4.9
Nationalist	Hugh MacLeod	3,222	44.2	+6.7
Total formal votes		7,288	99.5	+1.0
Informal votes		35	0.5	−1.0
Turnout		7,323	75.0	−1.6
Labor hold		Swing	+3.7	

1924 Victorian state election: Glenelg
Party	Candidate	Votes	%	±%
Labor	William Thomas	3,465	50.9	−2.2
Nationalist	Hugh MacLeod	2,555	37.5	−9.4
Country	Charles Waters	787	11.6	+11.6
Total formal votes		6,807	98.5	−1.0
Informal votes		106	1.5	+1.0
Turnout		6,913	76.6	+1.3
Two-party-preferred result
Labor	William Thomas		52.1	−1.0
Nationalist	Hugh MacLeod		47.9	+1.0
Labor hold		Swing	−1.0	

- Two party preferred vote was estimated.

1921 Victorian state election: Glenelg
Party	Candidate	Votes	%	±%
Labor	William Thomas	3,526	53.1	+9.0
Nationalist	Hugh Campbell	3,111	46.9	+14.5
Total formal votes		6,637	99.5	+3.6
Informal votes		34	0.5	−3.6
Turnout		6,671	75.3	−0.3
Labor hold		Swing	+2.7	

1920 Victorian state election: Glenelg
Party	Candidate	Votes	%	±%
Labor	William Thomas	2,892	44.1	+2.9
Nationalist	Hugh Campbell	2,121	32.4	−9.6
Victorian Farmers	William Williamson	1,538	23.5	+3.8
Total formal votes		6,551	95.9	−1.7
Informal votes		277	4.1	+1.7
Turnout		6,828	75.6	+9.5
Two-party-preferred result
Labor	William Thomas	3,301	50.4	+1.1
Nationalist	Hugh Campbell	3,250	49.6	−1.1
Labor gain from Nationalist		Swing	+1.1	

=== Elections in the 1910s ===
1917 Victorian state election: Glenelg
Party	Candidate	Votes	%	±%
Nationalist	Hugh Campbell	2,478	42.0	−16.1
Labor	William Thomas	2,433	41.2	−0.7
Victorian Farmers	Walter Watson	989	16.8	+16.8
Total formal votes		5,900	97.6	+0.9
Informal votes		147	2.4	−0.9
Turnout		6,047	66.1	+0.1
Two-party-preferred result
Nationalist	Hugh Campbell	2,992	50.7	−7.4
Labor	William Thomas	2,908	49.3	+7.4
Nationalist hold		Swing	−7.4	

1914 Victorian state election: Glenelg
Party	Candidate	Votes	%	±%
Liberal	Hugh Campbell	3,449	58.1	−0.3
Labor	Charles Paramor	2,491	41.9	+0.3
Total formal votes		5,940	96.7	−1.5
Informal votes		200	3.3	+1.5
Turnout		6,140	66.0	−8.8
Liberal hold		Swing	−0.3	

1911 Victorian state election: Glenelg
Party	Candidate	Votes	%	±%
Liberal	Hugh Campbell	3,626	58.4	N/A
Labor	Charles French	2,585	41.6	+41.6
Total formal votes		6,211	98.2	
Informal votes		114	1.8	
Turnout		6,325	74.8	
Liberal hold		Swing	N/A	
