= Electoral results for the district of Borung =

Victoria, Australia, district election results

This is a list of electoral results for the electoral district of Borung in Victorian state elections.

== Members for Borung ==
=== First incarnation (1889–1927) ===
Member	Party	Term
Walter Duncan		1889–1892
John Dyer		1892–1902
William Hutchinson	Ministerialist	1902–1917
William Hutchinson	Nationalist	1917–1920
David Allison	Victorian Farmers' Union	1920–1927

=== Second incarnation (1945–1955) ===
Member	Party	Term
Wilfred Mibus	Country	1945–1949
Wilfred Mibus	Liberal and Country	1949–1955

== Election results ==
=== Elections in the 1950s ===
1952 Victorian state election: Borung
Party	Candidate	Votes	%	±%
Liberal and Country	Wilfred Mibus	8,174	61.9	+5.5
Labor	Lionel Reid	5,030	38.1	+38.1
Total formal votes		13,204	99.3	+0.2
Informal votes		99	0.7	−0.2
Turnout		13,303	95.6	−0.5
Liberal and Country hold		Swing	N/A	

1950 Victorian state election: Borung
Party	Candidate	Votes	%	±%
Liberal and Country	Wilfred Mibus	7,354	56.4	+56.4
Country	Rupert Levitzke	5,644	43.6	−20.9
Total formal votes		13,031	99.1	0.0
Informal votes		123	0.9	0.0
Turnout		13,154	96.1	−0.1
Liberal and Country gain from Country		Swing	N/A	

=== Elections in the 1940s ===
1947 Victorian state election: Borung
Party	Candidate	Votes	%	±%
Country	Wilfred Mibus	8,225	64.5	+37.2
Independent Country	Finlay Cameron	4,521	35.5	+19.9
Total formal votes		12,746	99.1	+0.6
Informal votes		121	0.9	−0.6
Turnout		12,867	96.2	+5.9
Country hold		Swing	N/A	

1945 Victorian state election: Borung
Party	Candidate	Votes	%	±%
Labor	Arthur Ackland	3,680	31.8	
Country	Wilfred Mibus	3,159	27.3	
Independent Country	Winton Turnbull	2,273	19.7	
Country	Finlay Cameron	1,808	15.6	
Independent	Florence Rodan	645	5.6	
Total formal votes		11,565	98.5	
Informal votes		172	1.5	
Turnout		11,737	90.3	
Two-party-preferred result
Country	Wilfred Mibus	6,794	58.7	
Labor	Arthur Ackland	4,771	41.3	
Country hold		Swing		

=== Elections in the 1920s ===
1924 Victorian state election: Borung
Party	Candidate	Votes	%	±%
Country	David Allison	1,901	51.2	−1.4
Country	Edwin Reseigh	932	25.1	+25.1
Country	George Clyne	878	23.7	+23.7
Total formal votes		3,711	98.7	−0.8
Informal votes		51	1.3	+0.8
Turnout		3,762	47.9	−23.9
Country hold		Swing	N/A	

1921 Victorian state election: Borung
Party	Candidate	Votes	%	±%
Victorian Farmers	David Allison	2,938	52.6	+0.4
Nationalist	William Hutchinson	2,652	47.4	−0.4
Total formal votes		5,590	99.5	+1.6
Informal votes		31	0.5	−1.6
Turnout		5,621	71.8	+1.0
Victorian Farmers hold		Swing	+0.4	

1920 Victorian state election: Borung
Party	Candidate	Votes	%	±%
Victorian Farmers	David Allison	2,788	52.2	+3.8
Nationalist	William Hutchinson	2,557	47.8	−3.8
Total formal votes		5,345	97.9	+1.3
Informal votes		114	2.1	−1.3
Turnout		5,459	70.8	+9.7
Victorian Farmers gain from Nationalist		Swing	+3.8	

=== Elections in the 1910s ===
1917 Victorian state election: Borung
Party	Candidate	Votes	%	±%
Nationalist	William Hutchinson	2,266	51.6	
Victorian Farmers	Edwin Reseigh	2,127	48.4	
Total formal votes		4,393	96.6	
Informal votes		156	3.4	
Turnout		4,549	61.1	
Nationalist hold		Swing	N/A	

1914 Victorian state election: Borung
Party	Candidate	Votes	%	±%
Liberal	William Hutchinson	unopposed		
Liberal hold		Swing		

1911 Victorian state election: Borung
Party	Candidate	Votes	%	±%
Liberal	William Hutchinson	unopposed		
Liberal hold		Swing		
