= Electoral results for the district of Jika Jika =

Victoria, Australia, district election results

This is a list of electoral results for the electoral district of Jika Jika in Victorian state elections.

== Members for Jika Jika ==
| Member | Party | Term |
|---|---|---|
| Henry Beard | Labor | 1904–1907 |
| James Membrey | Ministerialist/Comm. Lib./Nationalist | 1907–1917 |
| John Cain I | Labor | 1917–1927 |

== Election results ==
=== Elections in the 1920s ===
1924 Victorian state election: Jika Jika
| Party | Candidate | Votes | % | ±% |
|---|---|---|---|---|
| Labor | John Cain | 14,927 | 65.2 | +10.7 |
| Nationalist | Philip Mayer | 7,949 | 34.8 | −10.7 |
| Total formal votes | | 22,876 | 99.7 | +0.1 |
| Informal votes | | 75 | 0.3 | −0.1 |
| Turnout | | 22,951 | 55.2 | +4.2 |
| Labor hold | | Swing | +10.7 | |

1921 Victorian state election: Jika Jika
| Party | Candidate | Votes | % | ±% |
|---|---|---|---|---|
| Labor | John Cain | 9,668 | 54.5 | −5.0 |
| Nationalist | Joseph Eller | 8,060 | 45.5 | +5.0 |
| Total formal votes | | 17,728 | 99.6 | +0.5 |
| Informal votes | | 80 | 0.4 | −0.5 |
| Turnout | | 17,808 | 51.0 | −12.8 |
| Labor hold | | Swing | −5.0 | |

1920 Victorian state election: Jika Jika
| Party | Candidate | Votes | % | ±% |
|---|---|---|---|---|
| Labor | John Cain | 12,993 | 59.5 | +12.2 |
| Nationalist | Arthur May | 8,851 | 40.5 | +10.5 |
| Total formal votes | | 21,844 | 99.1 | +1.9 |
| Informal votes | | 191 | 0.9 | −1.9 |
| Turnout | | 22,035 | 63.8 | +8.7 |
| Labor hold | | Swing | +8.9 | |

=== Elections in the 1910s ===
1917 Victorian state election: Jika Jika
| Party | Candidate | Votes | % | ±% |
|---|---|---|---|---|
| Labor | John Cain | 7,654 | 47.3 | +3.4 |
| Nationalist | Arthur May | 4,856 | 30.0 | −26.1 |
| Nationalist | Samuel Dennis | 3,283 | 20.8 | +20.8 |
| Independent Labor | George Jewell | 403 | 2.5 | +2.5 |
| Total formal votes | | 16,196 | 97.2 | −1.0 |
| Informal votes | | 476 | 2.8 | +1.0 |
| Turnout | | 16,672 | 55.1 | +3.9 |
Two-party-preferred result
| Labor | John Cain | 8,119 | 50.6 | +6.7 |
| Nationalist | Arthur May | 7,997 | 49.4 | −6.7 |
| Labor gain from Nationalist | | Swing | +6.7 | |

1914 Victorian state election: Jika Jika
| Party | Candidate | Votes | % | ±% |
|---|---|---|---|---|
| Liberal | James Membrey | 7,177 | 56.1 | −1.0 |
| Labor | Francis Morgan | 5,623 | 43.9 | +1.0 |
| Total formal votes | | 12,800 | 98.2 | −0.9 |
| Informal votes | | 232 | 1.8 | +0.9 |
| Turnout | | 13,032 | 51.2 | −14.7 |
| Liberal hold | | Swing | −1.0 | |

1911 Victorian state election: Jika Jika
| Party | Candidate | Votes | % | ±% |
|---|---|---|---|---|
| Liberal | James Membrey | 6,852 | 57.1 | +2.5 |
| Labor | William Miller | 5,139 | 42.9 | −2.5 |
| Total formal votes | | 11,991 | 99.1 | −0.6 |
| Informal votes | | 104 | 0.9 | +0.6 |
| Turnout | | 12,095 | 65.9 | +18.2 |
| Liberal hold | | Swing | +2.5 | |
