= Electoral results for the district of Kara Kara and Borung =

Victoria, Australia, district election results

This is a list of electoral results for the electoral district of Kara Kara and Borung in Victorian state elections.

== Members for Kara Kara and Borung ==
Member	Party	Term
John Pennington	Nationalist	1927–1931
John Pennington	United Australia	1931–1935
Finlay Cameron	Country	1935–1945

== Election results ==
=== Elections in the 1940s ===
1943 Victorian state election: Kara Kara and Borung
Party	Candidate	Votes	%	±%
Country	Finlay Cameron	5,147	60.9	+10.7
Labor	Arthur Ackland	3,302	39.1	+39.1
Total formal votes		8,449	99.1	0.0
Informal votes		78	0.9	0.0
Turnout		8,527	88.6	−6.7
Country hold		Swing	N/A	

1940 Victorian state election: Kara Kara and Borung
Party	Candidate	Votes	%	±%
Country	Finlay Cameron	5,117	50.2	−10.2
Country	Patrick Toohey	2,678	26.3	+26.3
Independent	John Green	2,390	23.5	−16.1
Total formal votes		10,185	99.1	−0.3
Informal votes		94	0.9	+0.3
Turnout		10,279	95.3	+1.2
Two-candidate-preferred result
Country	Finlay Cameron		56.1	−4.3
Country	Patrick Toohey		43.9	+43.9
Country hold		Swing	N/A	

- Two candidate preferred vote was estimated.

=== Elections in the 1930s ===
1937 Victorian state election: Kara Kara and Borung
Party	Candidate	Votes	%	±%
Country	Finlay Cameron	6,248	60.4	+32.8
Independent	John Green	4,093	39.6	+22.5
Total formal votes		10,341	99.4	+0.8
Informal votes		145	1.4	−0.8
Turnout		10,405	94.1	−0.6
Country hold		Swing	N/A	

1935 Victorian state election: Kara Kara and Borung
Party	Candidate	Votes	%	±%
United Australia	John Pennington	4,187	40.3	−33.2
Country	Finlay Cameron	2,867	27.6	+27.6
Independent	John Green	1,777	17.1	+17.1
Country	William Pearse	1,560	15.0	+15.0
Total formal votes		10,391	98.6	−0.9
Informal votes		145	1.4	+0.9
Turnout		10,536	94.7	−1.3
Two-candidate-preferred result
Country	Finlay Cameron	5,455	52.5	+52.5
United Australia	John Pennington	4,936	47.5	−26.0
Country gain from United Australia		Swing	N/A	

1932 Victorian state election: Kara Kara and Borung
Party	Candidate	Votes	%	±%
United Australia	John Pennington	7,370	73.5	+14.0
Labor	Carl Adler	2,661	26.5	+26.5
Total formal votes		10,031	99.5	0.0
Informal votes		54	0.5	0.0
Turnout		10,085	96.0	+4.4
United Australia hold		Swing	N/A	

=== Elections in the 1920s ===
1929 Victorian state election: Kara Kara and Borung
Party	Candidate	Votes	%	±%
Nationalist	John Pennington	5,915	59.5	+14.2
Country Progressive	Alexander Dowsley	4,026	40.5	+11.2
Total formal votes		9,941	99.5	+2.1
Informal votes		56	0.5	−2.1
Turnout		9,997	91.6	+0.8
Nationalist hold		Swing	+5.1	

1927 Victorian state election: Kara Kara and Borung
Party	Candidate	Votes	%	±%
Nationalist	John Pennington	4,217	45.3	
Country Progressive	Finlay Cameron	2,732	29.3	
Country	William Pearce	2,368	25.4	
Total formal votes		9,317	97.4	
Informal votes		250	2.6	
Turnout		9,567	90.8	
Two-candidate-preferred result
Nationalist	John Pennington	5,068	54.4	
Country Progressive	Finlay Cameron	4,249	45.6	
Nationalist hold		Swing		
