= Electoral district of Glenelg =

The Electoral district of Glenelg may refer to:

- Electoral district of Glenelg (South Australia), a district of the South Australian House of Assembly, 1938–1985
- Electoral district of Glenelg (Victoria), a district of the Victorian Legislative Assembly, 1904–1927
