= Redistribution Liberals =

Former political party in Victoria, Australia

The Redistribution Liberals were a loosely structured political party active in the Australian state of Victoria from 1924 to 1926. They were a group of disaffected Nationalists who opposed Sir Alexander Peacock's proposed redistribution bill.

The Liberals split from the Nationalists in May 1924, when five MPs spoke openly against the government's redistribution bill: Henry Angus, Alfred Billson, Oswald Snowball, Alfred Farthing and William Everard. They opposed the proposed redistribution, which entrenched smaller country seats compared to metropolitan ones, although for varied reasons. Billson, Angus and Farthing were concerned by the proposed abolition of their own rural seats, while Snowball and Everard were aggrieved that a promised reduction in the number of seats had not occurred. At the 1924 state election, all five Liberals were returned, although Snowball and Everard had to defeat endorsed Nationalist opponents.

After the election, the Liberals opposed the Nationalist government and attempted to form a coalition with the Country Party; this led to the advent of a Labor government under George Prendergast. The Liberals subsequently agreed to support a Country-Nationalist government, led by Country Party leader John Allan.

By 1925 the Liberals, although maintaining a separate identity, were attending Nationalist party meetings, where they advocated redistribution reform and a recommitment to "liberal" values. They supported a 1925 redistribution bill that continued rural malapportionment, but soon fell out again with the Nationalists and began to work more closely with Labor. In early 1926 they raised questions about the redistribution bill and the government was in danger of defeat, but divisions within their own ranks intervened. Angus, whose seat was no longer threatened, distanced himself; Snowball and Everard joined with Labor to oppose the redistribution; Farthing was offered Nationalist endorsement for the seat of Caulfield and accepted; and Billson's position was unclear due to his illness. At this time the Liberals ceased to operate as a distinct group. At the 1927 state election, Billson retired, Farthing was an endorsed Nationalist, and Snowball, Everard and Angus were re-elected as independent Nationalists. A new Australian Liberal Party filled the resulting gap.
