= Roderick McLeod (politician) =

Australian politician

Roderick Hugh McLeod (22 December 1862 – 26 November 1924) was an Australian politician.

== Early life ==
He was born in Daylesford to Donald McLeod and Annie Rennie. He was a teacher and journalist, having graduated with a Bachelor of Arts from the University of Melbourne. He taught at Wesley College and was also a sporting coach at Melbourne University. Around 1885 he married Molly Heffernan, with whom he had one son.

== Political career ==
In 1923 he contested a by-election for the Victorian Legislative Assembly seat of Daylesford, which had been vacated on his father's death. Running as a Nationalist candidate, he was initially defeated by the Labor candidate James McDonald, but was then declared elected after a recount. He lost his seat to McDonald at the 1924 state election, and died later that year at South Yarra.

Victorian Legislative Assembly
Preceded by James McDonald	Member for Daylesford; 1923–1924	Succeeded by James McDonald
