= 1918 Flinders by-election =

- 11 May 1918
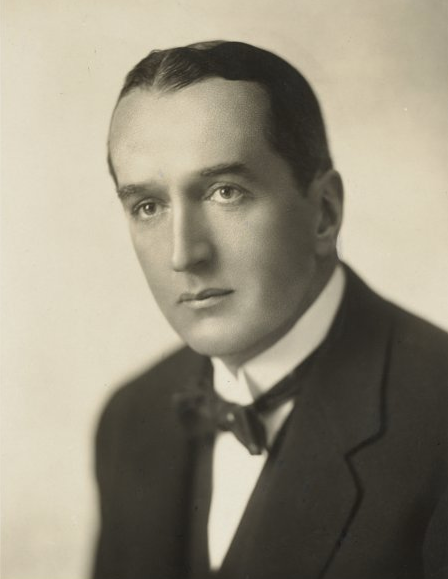
	First party	Second party
		ALP
Candidate	Stanley Bruce	Gordon Holmes
Party	Nationalist	Labor
Popular vote	14,455	7,740
Percentage	64.0%	34.3%
Swing	▲2.8pp	▼4.5pp
MP before election
William Irvine
Nationalist
Elected MP
Stanley Baldwin
Nationalist

A by-election was held for the Australian House of Representatives seat of Flinders on 11 May 1918. This was triggered by the resignation of Nationalist MP Sir William Irvine to become Chief Justice of the Supreme Court of Victoria.

The Victorian Farmers' Union withdrew their candidate after extracting a promise from the Nationalist government to introduce preferential voting, although his name remained on the ballot paper. The by-election was won by Nationalist candidate and future Prime Minister Stanley Bruce.

== Results ==
Flinders by-election, 1918
Party	Candidate	Votes	%	±%
Nationalist	Stanley Bruce	14,445	64.0	+2.8
Labor	Gordon Holmes	7,740	34.3	−4.5
Victorian Farmers	John Hall	382	1.7	+1.7
Total formal votes		22,567	99.1	
Informal votes		203	0.9	
Turnout		22,770	56.6	
Nationalist hold		Swing	+3.7	
