= John Chatham (politician) =

Australian politician

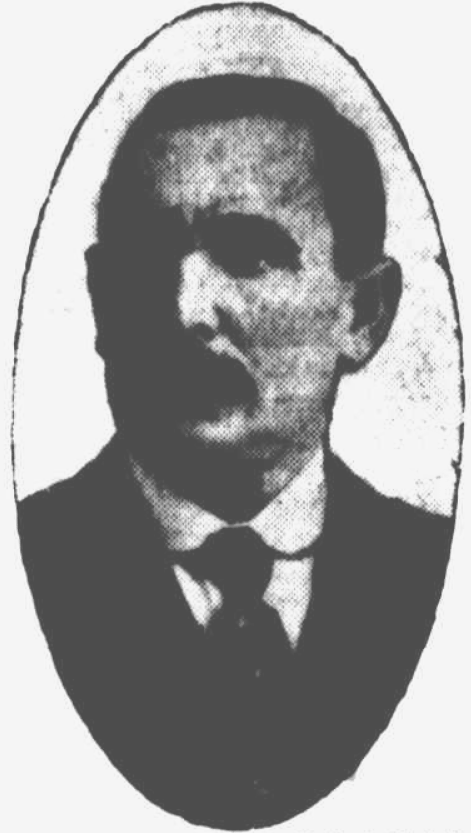
John Chatham.

John Chatham (16 October 1866 – 28 February 1925) was an Australian politician.

He was born in Napoleons to farmer James Chatham and Margaret Hanlon. He worked in various sawmills and as a contractor before buying land at Rokewood Junction and becoming a leading wheat farmer. On 25 August 1897 he married Ellen McGrath, with whom he had four children. He was elected to the Victorian Legislative Assembly at a by-election in 1913, representing Grenville as a member of the Labor Party. He was expelled for supporting conscription in the 1916 Labor split, and did not run for re-election in 1917. Chatham died in 1925 in Ballarat.

Victorian Legislative Assembly
| Preceded by Charles McGrath | Member for Grenville; 1913–1917 | Succeeded by David Gibson |
