= Ewen Cameron (Victorian politician) =

Australian politician

Ewen Cameron (10 April 1860 – 30 March 1906) was a politician, member of the Victorian Legislative Assembly.

Cameron was born in Morgiana near Hamilton, Victoria, the son of John Cameron and his wife Barbara Taylor. He was a grazier outside of politics, managing his family's property after his father's death, managing a property at Paschendale (then known as Struan) for five years, then at "Cloverdale", near Condah and Sinclair estate at Drumborg. He was elected to the Victorian Legislative Assembly on 1 November 1900, serving until his death in office in 1906.

Cameron married Emma Harriet, née Nunn, and had four children. Maud Cameron became a teacher and school headmistress; Winifred became a doctor; and Edith became a nurse and served in Europe in World War I.

Victorian Legislative Assembly
| Preceded by Donald Norman McLeod | Member for Portland; 1 Nov 1900 – 1 May 1904 | Abolished |
| New seat | Member for Glenelg; 1 Jun 1904 – 1 Mar 1906 | Succeeded by Hugh Campbell |
