= James Johns (politician) =

Australian politician

James Arthur Johns (3 August 1893 – 17 August 1959) was a New Zealand-born Australian politician.

He was born at Millers Flat, Otago, to storekeeper Ezekiel Johns and Annie Cousins. He attended Otago High School and qualified as a pharmacist in 1912. In 1914 he migrated to Sydney, and served with the Australian Imperial Force. After a year working as a pharmacist in Britain, he returned to Australia, and on 7 April 1920 married Gladys May Fort, with whom he had a daughter. He worked as a pharmacist and in 1929 moved to Maffra in Victoria. From 1942 to 1954 he served on Maffra Shire Council. Although initially a member of the Country Party, in 1945 he joined the Labor Party and was elected to the Victorian Legislative Assembly for Gippsland North. He was defeated in 1947. Johns retired from work in 1957 and died in Maffra in 1959.

Victorian Legislative Assembly
| Preceded by Bill Fulton | Member for Gippsland North; 1945–1947 | Succeeded by Bill Fulton |
