= Alexander Borthwick =

Australian politician

Alexander Hay Borthwick (27 May 1884 – 5 May 1942) was an Australian politician.

He was born in Maffra to banker William Borthwick and Ada Maud Bell. He worked for the Standard Bank of South Africa for a decade after leaving school, and in 1911 returned to Victoria to farm at Fulham. During World War I he served with the 8th Light Horse Regiment at Gallipoli and was wounded at the battle of the Nek; he also lost an arm in Palestine at the battle of Romani. Around 1916 he married Eve Sage, with whom he had seven children. After the war he farmed at Kilmany and in 1926 co-founded a stock and station agency based in Sale. In 1938 he won a by-election for the Victorian Legislative Assembly seat of Gippsland North, representing the Country Party. He served until his death in Sale in 1942.

Victorian Legislative Assembly
Preceded by James McLachlan	Member for Gippsland North; 1938–1942	Succeeded by Bill Fulton
