= Andrew Anderson (Australian politician) =

Australian politician

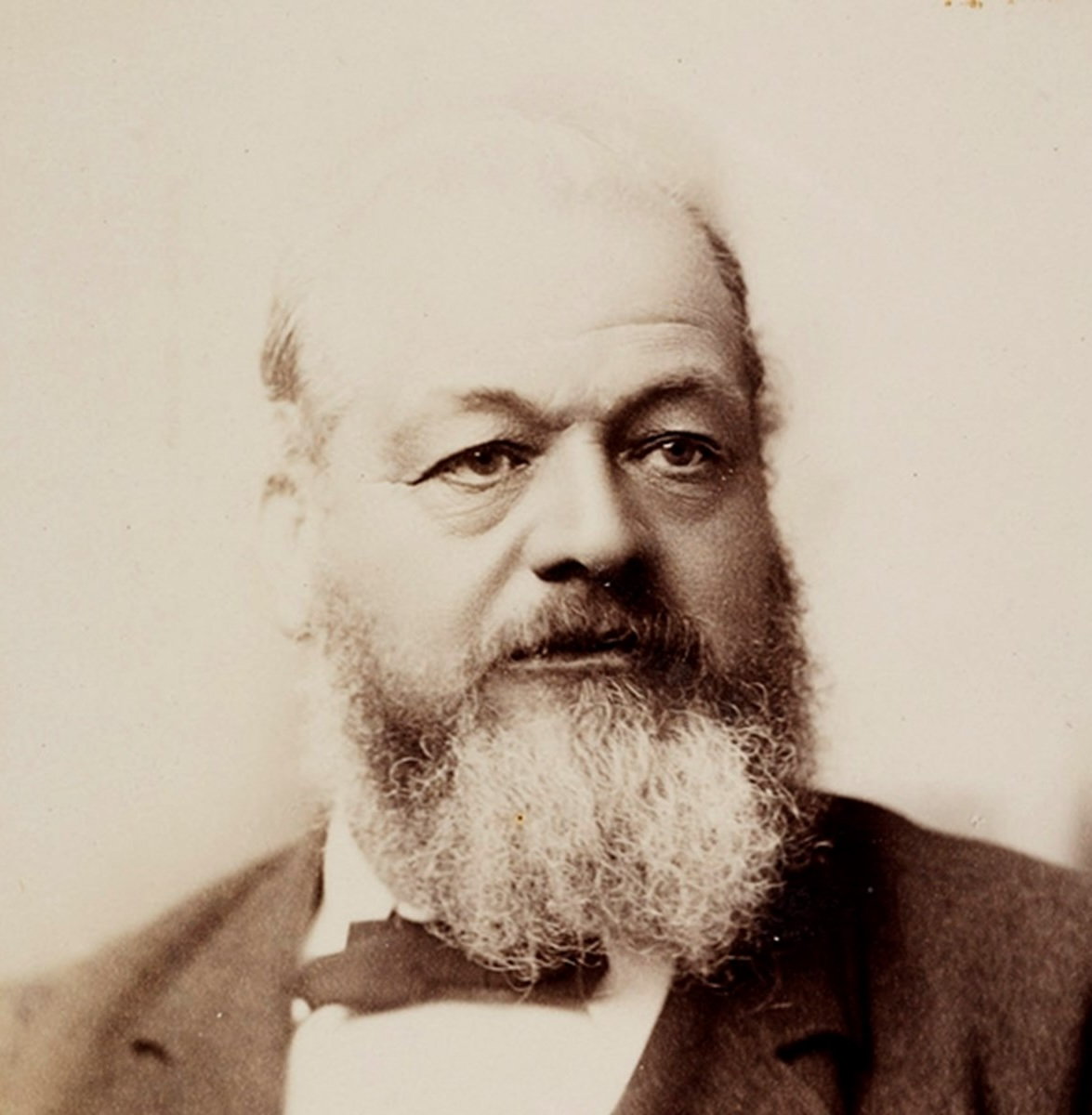

Member of the Victorian Legislative Assembly for Electoral district of Kara Kara
- In office June 1893 – 10 April 1897
- Preceded by: John Dow
- Succeeded by: Peter McBride

Personal details
- Born: fl. 1838 Glasgow, Scotland
- Died: 10 April 1897 St Arnaud, Victoria

Andrew Anderson (fl. 1838 – 10 April 1897) was an Australian politician in the Victorian Legislative Assembly. Anderson served as the member for Kara Kara between 1893 and 1897.
