= Bill Phelan =

Australian politician and businessman

William Phelan (16 July 1915 – 22 December 1973) was an Australian politician.

Phelan was born in Maryborough to ironmonger Sydney Clifford Phelan and Letitia Ellen Chellew. He attended the local high school and, on 22 October 1938, married Hazel Patten, with whom he had four children. He worked in the family firm and in 1939 succeeded his father as managing director. He expanded the firm until in 1950 it had become the largest in Maryborough. From 1944 to 1961, he served on Maryborough Council, with a term as mayor from 1954 to 1955.

In 1964, Phelan was elected to the Victorian Legislative Assembly as a Country Party member for Kara Kara. He served until his defeat in 1970. Phelan died at Maryborough in 1973.

Victorian Legislative Assembly
Preceded by Keith Turnbull	Member for Kara Kara; 1964–1970	Succeeded by Esmond Curnow
