= Esmond Curnow =

Australian politician

Esmond Julian Curnow (27 October 1946 - 28 May 2025) was an Australian politician. He was born in Bendigo to factory manager Thomas William Curnow and Esma Jean Cook. He attended Bendigo High School and became the manager of a bedding store.

He joined the Labor Party in 1962 and was a member of the Castlemaine and Moonee Ponds branches. In 1970, he was elected to the Victorian Legislative Assembly for Kara Kara, serving until his seat was abolished in 1976.

After leaving politics he became a publican, and also the secretary of the Bendigo Trades Hall Council from 1981 to 1983. From 1983 to 1985, he was a training officer with the Trade Union Training Authority, and from 1985 he was a National Union of Workers official. He married Jennifer Diane Freeman on 23 January 1976 and they were divorced in 1984.

Victorian Legislative Assembly
Preceded by Bill Phelan	Member for Kara Kara; 1970–1976	Abolished
