= Keith Turnbull =

Australian politician and farmer

Keith Hector Turnbull (28 December 1907 – 4 September 1978) was an Australian politician.

Turnbull was born in Bendigo to farmer Walter Turnbull and Margaret Gunning. He attended the local state school and became a farmer at Wedderburn. He served in the AIF during World War II and around 1940 married Olive Jean Mellis, with whom he had five children.

In 1950 Turnbull was elected to the Victorian Legislative Assembly as the Liberal and Country Party member for Korong. He transferred to Kara Kara in 1955 and became Minister of Lands and Soldier Settlement; he added the Conservation portfolio in 1961. In 1964 he was defeated by a Country Party candidate and retired from politics. His cousin Campbell Turnbull and son-in-law Charles Hider were also members of the Victorian Parliament. After politics he was chairman of the Grain Elevators Board from 1965 to 1977. Turnbull died at Ascot Vale in 1978.

Victorian Legislative Assembly
Preceded by Sir Albert Dunstan	Member for Korong; 1950–1955	Abolished
New seat	Member for Kara Kara; 1955–1964	Succeeded by Bill Phelan
