= Bill Fulton (Victorian politician) =

Australian politician (1891–1975)

William Oliver Fulton (24 February 1891 – 27 August 1975) was an Australian politician.

Fulton was born in Mooroopna to butcher George Fulton and Caroline Eatwell. Educated locally, he became a blacksmith at Charlton and Wonthaggi, and served with the 13th Light Horse Regiment in World War I. On 24 April 1915 he married Mary Emma Lancaster, with whom he had five children. In 1921 he settled at Maffra, where he became a manufacturer of agricultural implements. In June 1955 he had married Marjorie Beryl Moss, née Cowden.

In 1942 Fulton was elected to the Victorian Legislative Assembly as the Country Party member for Gippsland North. Defeated in 1945, he was returned in 1947. In 1950 he was appointed Minister of Health in the Country Party government, but he lost his seat in 1952. In 1953 he won a by-election for Gippsland Province in the Victorian Legislative Council, where he served until his retirement in 1964. Fulton died in Maffra in 1975.

Victorian Legislative Assembly
Preceded by Alexander Borthwick	Member for Gippsland North; 1942–1945	Succeeded by James Johns
Preceded by James Johns	Member for Gippsland North; 1947–1952	Succeeded by Hector Stoddart
Victorian Legislative Council
Preceded by Trevor Harvey	Member for Gippsland; 1953–1964; Served alongside: William MacAulay; Bob May	Succeeded by Arthur Hewson
