= James McKean (Australian politician) =

Australian politician

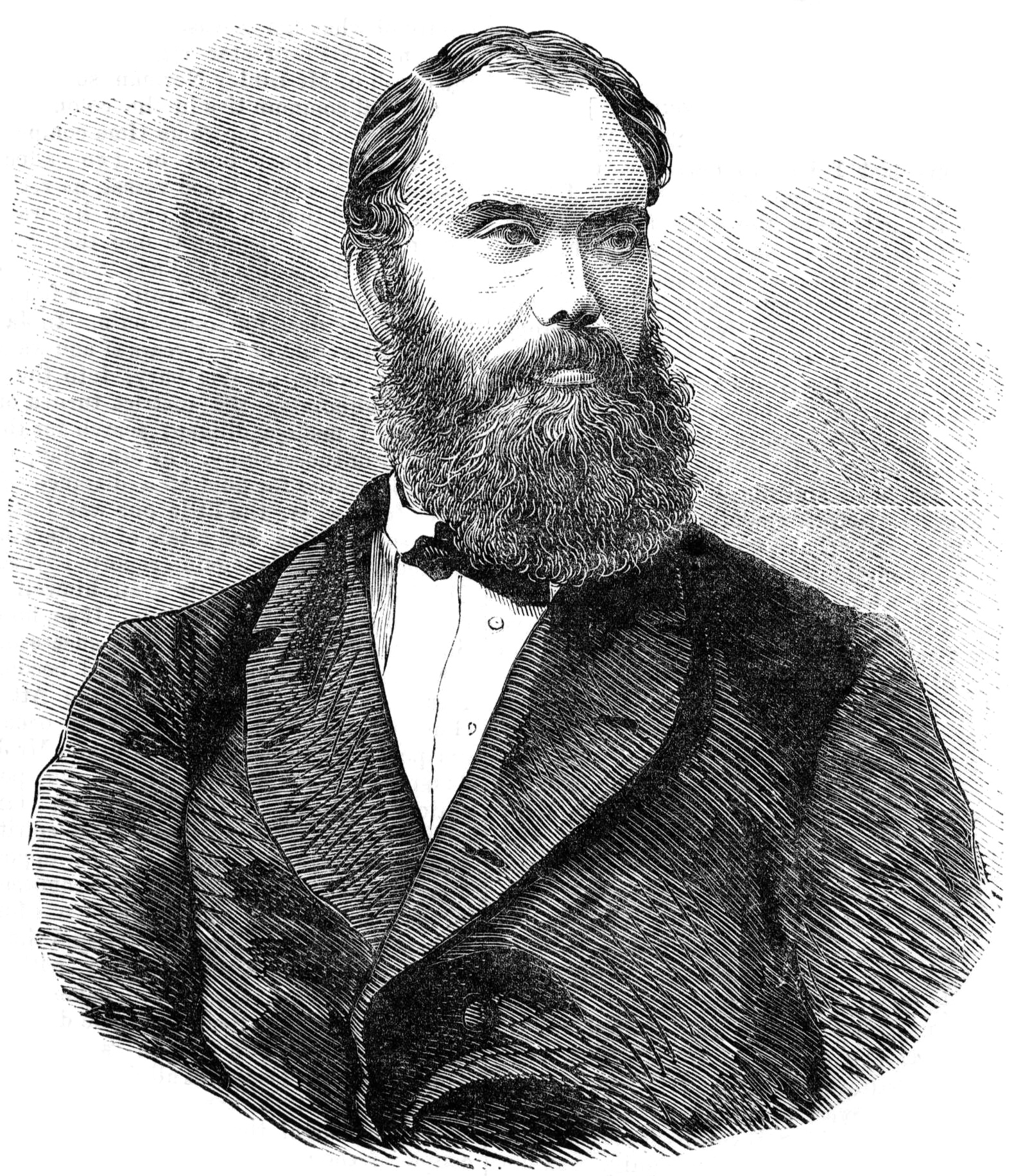
James McKean, 1869 engraving

James McKean (24 April 1832 – 12 June 1901) was a solicitor and politician in colonial Victoria (Australia), a member of the Victorian Legislative Assembly, President of the Board of Land & Works and commissioner Crown Lands and Survey from 1869 to 1870.

McKean was born in Belfast, Ireland, the son of Rev. David McKean and his wife Sarah, née Smith.

McKean emigrated to Victoria about 1854, and experienced a variety of the ups and downs of colonial life. In 1863 he was admitted a solicitor of the Supreme Court of Victoria, and practised in Melbourne. Mackay was returned to the Victorian Assembly for Maryborough in February 1866, holding the seat until January 1871, and was President of the Board of Land & Works and commissioner Crown Lands and Survey from 20 September 1869 to 9 April 1870 in the John Alexander MacPherson Ministry.

McKean was elected to North Gipps Land in a May 1875 by-election. During the prevalence of the "Stonewall" agitation, in 1876, McKean was committed to the custody of the Serjeant-at-Arms for disorderly conduct in defying the closure rule, and was ultimately expelled the House in June 1876 for some uncomplimentary references to his fellow-members of the Assembly, made whilst conducting a police court case. McKean was subsequently again elected for North Gipps Land in May 1880, but was defeated at the general election in February 1883, and did not re-enter parliament, though he contested Collingwood in June 1892 and 1894.

McKean died in East Melbourne on 12 June 1901.
