= Finlay Cameron =

Australian politician

Finlay Arthur Cameron (22 June 1886 – 21 February 1959) was an Australian politician.

He was born in Wauraltee in South Australia to farmer George Muir Cameron and Elizabeth Jane Miller. His family moved to Victoria in 1891 and Cameron attended state schools before inheriting property at Bangerang in 1909. In 1911 he married May Victoria Marshman, with whom he had seven children. As a farmer he was an executive member of the Victorian Wheatgrowers' Association from 1927 to 1932. A member of the Country Progressive Party in the 1920s, he was elected to the Victorian Legislative Assembly in 1935 as the Country Party member for Kara Kara and Borung. He supported the party executive against Albert Dunstan in 1939. Cameron's seat was abolished in 1945 and he was defeated contesting Borung. He moved to Cheltenham in 1948 and served on Moorabbin City Council from 1949 to 1952. Cameron died in Cheltenham in 1959.

Victorian Legislative Assembly
Preceded by John Pennington	Member for Kara Kara and Borung; 1935–1945	Abolished
