= Arthur Hughes (politician) =

Australian politician

Member of the Victorian Legislative Assembly for Hampden
- In office 9 April 1927 – 30 November 1929
- Preceded by: David Oman
- Succeeded by: Chester Manifold

Member of the Victorian Legislative Assembly for Grenville
- In office 30 August 1921 – 9 April 1927
- Preceded by: David Gibson
- Succeeded by: Seat abolished

Personal details
- Born: 25 October 1885 Broomfield, Victoria
- Died: 1 February 1968 (aged 82) Ballarat, Victoria
- Party: Labor Party

Military service
- Allegiance: Australia
- Branch/service: Australian Army
- Years of service: 1915–1917; 1940–1943
- Rank: Lieutenant
- Battles/wars: First World War; Second World War
- Awards: Military Cross

Arthur Hughes MC (25 October 1885 – 1 February 1968) was an Australian politician.

He was born in Broomfield to miner David Solomon Hughes and Esther Vickers. He was a schoolteacher in Ballarat, and during World War I served with the Australian Imperial Force in Egypt and France; wounded in 1916, he was invalided home and awarded the Military Cross. A Labor Party member, he was active in the campaign against military conscription. After the war, he was a soldier settler at Newlyn, and in 1921 he was elected to the Victorian Legislative Assembly as the Labor member for Grenville. He transferred to Hampden in 1927, but was defeated in 1929. In 1932, he left the Labor Party, feeling that it was insufficiently anti-communist. Hughes died in Ballarat in 1968.

Victorian Legislative Assembly
Preceded by David Gibson	Member for Grenville; 1921–1927	Abolished
Preceded by David Oman	Member for Hampden; 1927–1929	Succeeded by Chester Manifold
