= Hugh Campbell (Australian politician) =

Australian politician

Hugh John Munro Campbell (c. 1854 – 20 October 1921) was an Australian politician.

Campbell was born in Melbourne to merchant William Munro Campbell and Christina Matheson. He grew up in Portland from the age of eight, and was an apprentice grocer before entering the family business. On 21 January 1880 he married Harriett Jarrett, with whom he had three children; he would later remarry on 9 June 1920, to Ethel May Waddell. In May 1906 he won a by-election for the Victorian Legislative Assembly seat of Glenelg. A Liberal, he was a minister without portfolio in the Nationalist government from 1918 to 1920. He lost his seat to a Labor candidate in 1920 and was unsuccessful in attempting to regain it in 1921. Campbell died at St Kilda on 20 October 1921.

Victorian Legislative Assembly
Preceded by Ewen Cameron	Member for Glenelg; 1906–1920	Succeeded by William Thomas
