= Donald McLeod (Victorian state politician) =

Australian politician

Donald McLeod (1837 – 8 July 1923), was an Australian politician, member of the Victorian Legislative Assembly.

McLeod was born in Caithness, Scotland and arrived in Australia in 1847. In November 1900 he was elected to the Victorian Legislative Assembly for Daylesford, a seat he held until his death. McLeod was Minister without Portfolio from June 1902 to February 1904; Minister of Mines and of Forests from 16 Feb 1904 to 8 January 1909; Minister of Water Supply from March to April 1904, Chief Secretary and Minister of Public Health from November 1915 to November 1917. He was a member of the Railways Electrification committee 1912 and was chairman of the Electricity Supply committee 1922.

McLeod died in Middle Park, Melbourne, Victoria, Australia, survived by his wife and seven of their ten children.

Victorian Legislative Assembly
Preceded by James Wheeler	Member for Daylesford; Nov. 1900 – July 1923	Succeeded by James McDonald
