= William Hutchinson (Victorian politician) =

Australian politician

William Hutchinson (31 May 1864 – 18 December 1924) was an Australian politician.

Hutchinson was born in Stawell to miner William Hutchinson and Mary née McKay. He attended state school and then night school while working on his uncle's farm. He was a shop assistant in Murtoa until 1885, when he became a watchmaker and jeweller at Warracknabeal. On 7 September 1898 he married Janet Mackay, with whom he had four children.

In October 1902 Hutchinson was elected to the Victorian Legislative Assembly as the member for Borung. A Country Liberal who opposed Thomas Bent, he was Minister of Water Supply and Agriculture from 22 December 1913 to 9 November 1915, Commissioner of Crown Lands and Survey from 9 November 1915 - 29 November 1917, and Minister of Public Instruction and Forests from 1918 to 1920. He was defeated by David Allison, a Victorian Farmers' Union candidate in 1920. Hutchinson, who had sold his Warracknabeal business in 1907 and resided in Melbourne, died in East Malvern in 1924. His nephew John Austin Gray was later a member of the Victorian Parliament.

Victorian Legislative Assembly
Preceded by John Dyer	Member for Borung; 1902–1920	Succeeded by David Allison
