= James Membrey =

Australian politician

James George Membrey (23 March 1862 – 12 November 1940) was an Australian politician.

He was born in Buninyong to storekeeper James Membrey and Mary Anne Hadley, but he grew up in Napoleons and Ballarat. He worked as a plasterer at Northcote and from 1891 was a valuer and collector for Northcote Town Council. On 27 April 1886 he married Elizabeth Pearse Carvosse, with whom he had five children. In 1907 he was elected to the Victorian Legislative Assembly for Jika Jika. Although he was a Liberal, he opposed Thomas Bent's government in 1908. He served as a minister without portfolio from 1914 to 1917, when he left parliament. Membrey died in Preston in 1940.

Victorian Legislative Assembly
Preceded by Henry Beard	Member for Jika Jika; 1907–1917	Succeeded by John Cain
