= Electoral district of Borung =

Former state electoral district of Victoria, Australia

Coordinates: 36°36′S 142°30′E

Borung Victoria—Legislative Assembly
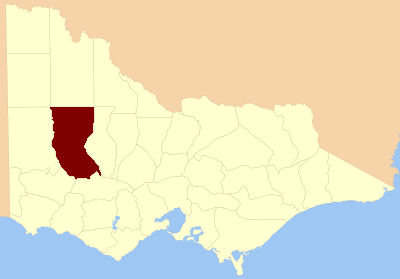
- County of Borung, approximately the electoral district
- State: Victoria
- Dates current: 1889–1927, 1945–1955
- Demographic: Rural

The electoral district of Borung was an electorate of the Victorian Legislative Assembly in the Australian colony (state from 1901) of Victoria, which existed in two incarnations, from 1889 to 1927, and then from 1945 to 1955.

Borung was created in 1889 as a single-member electorate, its area was defined in The Electoral Act Amendment Act, 1888 as "Commencing on the north boundary of the county of Borung, at the north-east angle of the parish of Joop; thence southerly by the east boundaries of the parishes of Joop, Batyik, Tarranyurk. Katyil, and Dimboola; easterly by the south boundaries of the parishes of Kewell West and Kewell East to the Yarriambiac Creek; southerly up that creek to the three-chain road from Pimpinio to St. Arnaud; easterly by that road to the east boundary of the parish or Ashens; south by the east boundary to the south-east angle of the same; east by the north boundary of the parish of Marma to the road on the east of allotments 91, 88, and 83; south by that road to the south boundary of that parish; east by the south boundaries of the parishes of Marma and Wirchilleba to the south-east angle of allotment 192, parish of Wirchilleba; north to Richardson River; down that river and the Avon River to Lake Buloke; by the eastern shore of the lake to the south boundary of the parish of Corack; east by the south boundary of that parish and by the eastern boundaries of the parishes of Corack and Narraport to the three-chain road on the east of allotments 49 and 32; northerly, west and north by that road to the north boundary of the county of Borung, at the north-west angle of allotment 6, parish of Narraport; westerly by the county boundary to the commencing point."

Borung had four separate members until it was abolished in a redistribution and became the electoral district of Kara Kara and Borung in 1927.

The district was re-created in 1945, when the electoral district of Kara Kara and Borung was renamed in a redistribution, and the Dimboola and Horsham subdivisions of Lowan were subsumed into the new district. The district reverted to its original name of Lowan in 1955. The second incarnation of Borung only had one member—the sitting member for Lowan at its creation, Wilfred "Mick" Mibus—who was still the member for the district when it reverted to Lowan.

== Members for Borung ==
=== First incarnation (1889–1927) ===
Member	Party	Term
Walter Duncan		1889–1892
John Dyer		1892–1902
William Hutchinson	Ministerialist	1902–1917
William Hutchinson	Nationalist	1917–1920
David Allison	Victorian Farmers' Union	1920–1927

=== Second incarnation (1945–1955) ===
Member	Party	Term
Wilfred Mibus	Country	1945–1949
Wilfred Mibus	Liberal and Country	1949–1955

== See also ==
- Electoral district of Kara Kara and Borung
- Electoral district of Lowan
