= David Allison (Australian politician) =

Australian politician

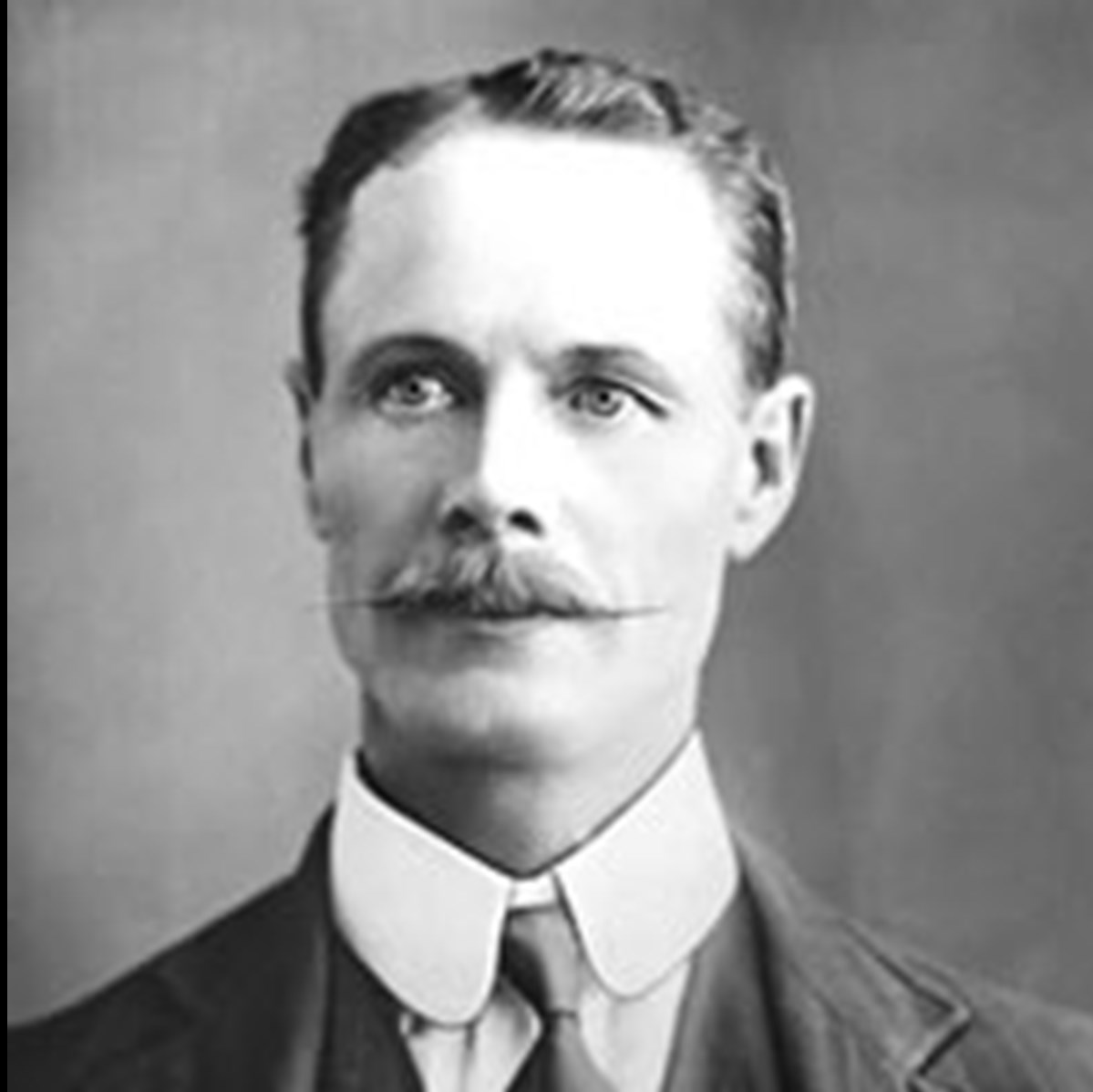
Portrait of David Allison

David Allison (23 July 1865 – 27 June 1928) was an Australian politician.

He was born at Coomoora near Daylesford to farmer David Allison and Alison Duff. He was a pioneer at Watchupga, where he ran a general store and had wheat and grazing lands. Around 1895 he married Harriett Sophia Pickering, with whom he had six children. From 1907 to 1922 he served on Birchip Shire Council, with a term as president in 1918–19.

In 1920 he was elected to the Victorian Legislative Assembly for Borung as a member of the Victorian Farmers' Union, which soon became the Country Party. Allison served until his retirement in 1927, and died the following year in Hawthorn.

Victorian Legislative Assembly
Preceded by William Hutchinson	Member for Borung; 1920–1927	Abolished
