= William Thomas (Victorian politician) =

Australian politician

William Edward Thomas (7 April 1869 – 11 July 1924) was an Australian politician.

Thomas was born in Portland to stonemason William Thomas and Grace Bossence (both born in Cornwall). He worked with his father before becoming an engine driver at the Broken Hill mines. On 12 September 1890 he married Eliza Tassicker, with whom he had four children. He returned to Portland around 1906, and became a farmer at Heywood.

In 1920 Thomas was elected to the Victorian Legislative Assembly as the Labor member for Glenelg. He was re-elected in 1924 but died in Heywood later that year; the by-election to replace him was won by his son-in-law, Ernie Bond.

Victorian Legislative Assembly
Preceded by Hugh Campbell	Member for Glenelg; 1920–1924	Succeeded by Ernie Bond
