= Electoral district of Jika Jika =

Jika Jika Victoria—Legislative Assembly
- State: Victoria
- Created: 1904
- Abolished: 1927
- Namesake: Shire of Jika Jika
- Demographic: Metropolitan
- Coordinates: 37°45′S 145°01′E

The electoral district of Jika Jika was an electoral district of the Legislative Assembly in the Australian state of Victoria. The district was defined by the Electoral Districts Boundaries Act 1903:

Commencing at the intersection of Nicholson-street and Scotchmer-street; thence east by Scotchmer-street to Falconer-street; thence north-easterly by that street to the Merri Creek; thence easterly and southerly by that creek to the Yarra River; thence easterly and north-easterly by the Yarra River to the Plenty River; thence northerly by that river to the south boundary of section 17, parish of Keelbundora; thence west by that boundary and the south boundaries of sections 16 and 15 to the Whittlesea-road; thence north-easterly by that road to the north boundary of section 15; thence west by the north boundaries of sections 15, 14, and 13 to the Merri Creek; thence southerly by that creek to the north boundary of the parish of Jika Jika; thence east by that boundary to the east boundary of section 148 in the last-named parish; thence south by that boundary and James-street to Bell-street; thence west by Bell-street to the Merri Creek; thence southerly by that creek to the north boundary creek to the north boundary of the parish of Jika Jika; thence east by that boundary to the east boundary of section 148 in the last-named parish; thence south by that boundary and James-street to Bell-street; thence west by Bell-street to the Merri Creek; thence southerly by that creek to the north boundary of portion of 93; thence west by that boundary to Nicholson-street to the commencing point.

The district was abolished in a redistribution in 1927, replaced by the electoral district of Northcote.

== Members for Jika Jika ==
Member	Party	Term
Henry Beard	Labor	1904–1907
James Membrey	Ministerialist/Comm. Lib./Nationalist	1907–1917
John Cain I	Labor	1917–1927
