= Electoral district of Kara Kara =

Former state electoral district in Victoria, Australia

Coordinates: 36°33′S 143°37′E

Kara Kara Victoria—Legislative Assembly
- State: Victoria
- Dates current: 1877–1927, 1955–1976
- Demographic: Rural

Kara Kara was an electoral district of the Legislative Assembly in the Australian state of Victoria from 1877 to 1927, and 1955 to 1976. It was based in north-western Victoria and included the subdivisions of Donald, Charlton, Minyip, Murtoa, St. Arnaud, Wedderburn, Inglewood, Dunnolly, Landsborough, Avoca, Maryborough and Carisbrook.

Kara Kara was abolished in 1976 and replaced by the electoral district of Ripon.

== Members for Kara Kara ==
First Incarnation 1877–1927
Member	Party	Term
John Dow	None	1877 – 1893
Andrew Anderson	None	1893^{#} – 1897
Sir Peter McBride	None	1897^{#} – 1913
John Pennington	Liberal	1913^{#} – 1917
John Hall	VFU	1917 – 1918
John Pennington	Nationalist	1918 – 1927

Kara Kara was abolished in 1927 and the district of Kara Kara and Borung was created, which existed until 1945. Pennington was the member for Kara Kara and Borung from 1927 to 1935.

Second Incarnation 1955–1976
Member	Party	Term
Keith Turnbull	Liberal and Country	1955 – 1964
Bill Phelan	Country	1964 – 1970
Esmond Curnow	Labor	1970 – 1976

^{#} = by-election
