= James McLachlan (Victorian politician) =

Australian politician

James Weir McLachlan (16 August 1862 – 18 September 1938) was an Australian politician.

McLachlan was born in Harcourt to saddler William Ramsay McLachlan and Mary Weir. He attended state schools and was a pupil teacher before inheriting the family's Sale saddlery. He worked as a journalist for the Gippsland Times. In 1908 he was elected to the Victorian Legislative Assembly as the Labor member for Gippsland North. He married Celia Sarah Hearn on 23 December 1912; they had two children. He resigned from the Labor Party over conscription in 1916 and was a member of the National Labor Party, but he did not join the Nationalist Party and remained in the Assembly as an independent. Known for his eccentricity, he supported governments of all three parties at various times. McLachlan held his seat until his death in 1938 from a heart attack.

Victorian Legislative Assembly
Preceded by Hubert Keogh	Member for Gippsland North; 1908–1938	Succeeded by Alexander Borthwick
