= Electoral district of Kara Kara and Borung =

Former state electoral district of Victoria, Australia

Coordinates: 36°38′S 142°50′E

Kara Kara and Borung Victoria—Legislative Assembly
- State: Victoria
- Created: 1927
- Abolished: 1945
- Namesake: County of Kara Kara, County of Borung
- Demographic: Rural

The Electoral district of Kara Kara and Borung was an electoral district of the Victorian Legislative Assembly.

== Members for Kara Kara and Borung ==
Member	Party	Term
John Pennington	Nationalist	1927–1931
John Pennington	United Australia	1931–1935
Finlay Cameron	Country	1935–1945

== See also ==
- Parliaments of the Australian states and territories
- List of members of the Victorian Legislative Assembly
