= Electoral district of Grenville =

Former state electoral district of Victoria, Australia

Coordinates: 37°50′S 143°40′E

Grenville Victoria—Legislative Assembly
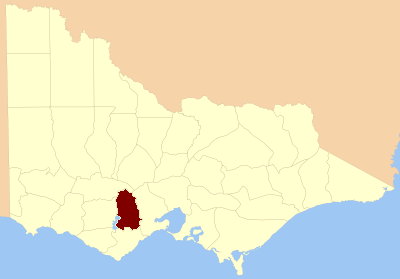
- District of Grenville
- State: Victoria
- Created: 1859
- Abolished: 1927
- Namesake: County of Grenville
- Demographic: Rural

Grenville was an electoral district of the Legislative Assembly in the Australian state of Victoria from 1859 to 1927. It was located in western Victoria, south of Ballarat.

== Members ==
Two members initially, one from 1904.

Member 1	Term	Member 2 (until 1904)	Term
Robert Gillespie	Oct 1859 – Jul 1861	Richard Henry Lock	Oct 1859 – Jul 1861
Robert Gillespie	Aug 1861 – Mar 1862	Alfred Arthur O'Connor	Aug 1861 – Aug 1864
Mark Pope^{[b]}	Mar 1862 – Dec 1865	Thomas Randall	Nov 1864 – Dec 1865
Henry Henty	Feb 1866 – Dec 1867	Sir Francis Murphy	Feb 1866 – Jan 1871
Thomas Russell	Mar 1868 – Jan 1873	Sir Francis Murphy	Feb 1866 – Jan 1871
Thomas Russell	Mar 1868 – Jan 1873	William Clarke	Apr 1871 – Apr 1877
John Montgomery^{[b]}	May 1873 – Mar 1874	William Clarke	Apr 1871 – Apr 1877
Mark Pope	May 1874 – Jul 1874 ^{[d]}	William Clarke	Apr 1871 – Apr 1877
Richard Henry Lock	Aug 1874 – Apr 1877	William Clarke	Apr 1871 – Apr 1877
John Bird	May 1877 – Feb 1880	David Davies	May 1877 – Jun 1894
Alexander Young	May 1880 – Sep 1894	David Davies	May 1877 – Jun 1894
George Russell^{[b]}	July 1894 – Apr 1900	David Kerr	Oct 1894 – Sep 1897
George Russell^{[b]}	July 1894 – Apr 1900	Michael Stapleton	Oct 1897 – Nov 1899
James Sadler^{[b]}	June 1900 – Aug 1902	David Kerr^{[b]}	Dec 1899 – May 1904
Austin Austin	Oct 1902 – May 1904	David Kerr^{[b]}	Dec 1899 – May 1904

Single Member District 1904–1927
Member	Party	Term
Charles McGrath	Labor	1904–1913
John Chatham^{[b]}	Labor	1913–1916
John Chatham^{[b]}	Independent	1916–1917
David Gibson	VFU	1917–1921
Arthur Hughes	Labor	1921–1927

^{[b]} = elected in a by-election
^{[d]} = died in office

Grenville was preceded by the "Electoral district of Polwarth, Ripon, Hampden and South Grenville" and "Electoral district of North Grenville" which were both original districts of the first Legislative Assembly of 1856 and was abolished in 1859.

The Electoral district of Warrenheip and Grenville was created in 1927 after Grenville was abolished.

Arthur Hughes, the last member for Grenville, represented Electoral district of Hampden from April 1927.
