= John Pennington (politician) =

Australian politician

John Warburton Pennington CBE (29 August 1870 – 5 April 1945) was an Australian politician.

Pennington was born in Navarre to hotelier and grazier Daniel Pennington and Helen Creamer. He attended Queen's College, Melbourne, and worked for a St Arnaud storekeeper before establishing his own store at Bealiba. In 1894 he married Ellen Sara Tantau, with whom he had five children. He served on Bet Bet Shire Council from 1900 to 1907 and was president from 1906 to 1907.

In 1913 Pennington won a by-election for the Victorian Legislative Assembly seat of Kara Kara. He was defeated in 1917, but on a recount was reseated in early 1918. He transferred to Kara Kara and Borung in 1927. He was Assistant Minister of Agriculture from November 1920 to February 1921 and from July 1921 to September 1923, and then Minister of Forests, Agriculture, Markets and Immigration from 1928 to 1929 and Minister of Public Instruction from 1932 to 1935. He was appointed a Commander of the Order of the British Empire in 1926. Pennington lost his seat in 1935, and died in Paradise in 1945.

Victorian Legislative Assembly
Preceded by Sir Peter McBride	Member for Kara Kara; 1913–1917	Succeeded by John Hall
Preceded by John Hall	Member for Kara Kara; 1918–1927	Abolished
New seat	Member for Kara Kara and Borung; 1927–1935	Succeeded by Finlay Cameron
