= Electoral district of Gippsland North =

State electoral district of Victoria, Australia

Coordinates: 37°30′S 148°0′E

Gippsland North Victoria—Legislative Assembly
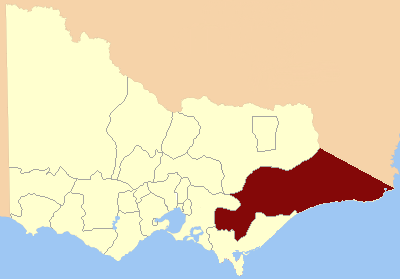
- Location in Victoria, 1859
- State: Victoria
- Created: 1859
- Abolished: 1955
- Namesake: Gippsland
- Demographic: Rural

Gippsland North (North Gipps Land or North Gippsland until 1889) was an electoral district of the Legislative Assembly in the Australian state of Victoria located in northern Gippsland from 1859 to 1955.

In 1859, the Electoral district of Gippsland was abolished and new districts of Electoral district of North Gipps Land and South Gipps Land were created. The district of North Gipps Land was defined in the Victorian Electoral Act, 1858 as:

Bounded on the south and east by the sea; on the north by a line bearing west from Cape Howe to the source of the nearest tributary of the Murray, and by the Alps; and on the west by the Alps and the counties of Evelyn and Mornington, excepting the country comprised in the Electoral District of South Gipps Land

== Members ==
One member initially, two from 1877, One member again from 1889 when the new Electoral district of Gippsland Central was created.

North Gipps Land (Two members 1877–1889)
Member 1	Term		
John Johnson (Knud Olai Boe)	Oct 1859 – July 1861		
John Everard	Aug 1861 – Aug 1861^{[d]}		
George Mackay	Nov 1861^{[b]} – Apr 1864		
John Everard	Apr 1864^{[b]} – Aug 1864		
William Pearson, Sr.	Nov 1864 – Dec 1867		
Frederick Leopold Smyth	Mar 1868 – Mar? 1875		
James McKean	May 1875^{[b]} – July 1876^{[x]}	Member 2	Term
Charles Gavan Duffy	Aug 1876^{[b]} – Feb 1880	Frederick Leopold Smyth	May 1877 – Feb 1880
Allan McLean	May 1880 – Mar 1889	James McKean	May 1880 – Feb 1883
Allan McLean	May 1880 – Mar 1889	Albert Harris	Feb 1883 – Mar 1889

Single Member District
Member	Party	Term
Allan McLean		1889 – 1901
Hubert Keogh		1901 – 1908
James McLachlan	Labor	1908 – 1916
James McLachlan	National Labor	1916 – 1917
James McLachlan	Independent	1917 – 1938
Alexander Borthwick	Country	1938 – 1942
Bill Fulton	Country	1942 – 1945
James Johns	Labor	1945 – 1947
Bill Fulton	Country	1947 – 1952
Hector Stoddart	Labor	1952 – 1955

== Election Auditors ==
John Lightfoot Esquire, a resident of Sale, was re-appointed as the Election Auditor for the district of North Gipps Land in July 1859.

== Elections ==
At the 1859 election for North Gipps Land, Mr Boyd Cuninghame nominated Mr Johnson of Mewburn Park. Mr Johnson was a long time resident and his political views were well known. The nomination was seconded by Mr P. McArdell. No other candidate was nominated and therefore Mr Johnson was duly declared elected.

== Notes ==
^{b} = by-election
^{d} = disqualified
^{x} = expelled
