= John Hall (Victorian politician) =

Australian politician and journalist

- Born: 18 February 1884; Eaglehawk, Victoria, Australia
- Died: 30 June 1949 (aged 65); Richmond, Victoria, Australia
- Occupations: politician, journalist
- Known for: member, Victorian Legislative Assembly
- Notable work: editor, Farmer's Advocate, Morning Post, Leader
- Political party: Nationalist Party of Australia
- Spouse: Clarissa Jessamine Snell (m. 1907)
- Children: 6
- Parents: Joseph Hall (father); Isabella Hall, née Gray (mother)

John Joseph Hall (18 February 1884 – 30 June 1949) was an Australian politician and journalist.

He was born in Eaglehawk to miner and tea merchant Joseph Hall and Isabella, née Gray. He attended state school before becoming a booking clerk with Victorian Railways and a journalist with the Bendigo Advertiser; he was also mining correspondent for The Argus. He married Clarissa Jessamine Snell on 26 December 1907, with whom he had six children. Active in the Kyabram Reform Movement, he was a founder of the Victorian Farmers' Union (VFU) in 1916 and served as its general secretary from 1916 to 1918. In 1917 he was elected to the Victorian Legislative Assembly as the member for Kara Kara, but he was defeated on a recount in February 1918. He was subsequently the VFU's candidate for the 1918 federal Flinders by-election, but withdrew after extracting a promise from the Nationalist Party to introduce preferential voting. Despite several attempts, Hall never re-entered parliament. He remained a journalist, editing the Farmer's Advocate (1917–1924), the Morning Post (1924–1927) and the Leader (1946–1949). Hall died in 1949 in Richmond.
