= Electoral district of Daylesford =

Former electoral district of the Victorian Legislative Assembly, Australia

Coordinates: 37°21′S 144°09′E

Daylesford Victoria—Legislative Assembly
- State: Victoria
- Created: 1889
- Abolished: 1927
- Namesake: Town of Daylesford
- Demographic: Rural

The Electoral district of Daylesford was an electoral district of the Victorian Legislative Assembly. It included the town of Daylesford, around 155 km north-west of Melbourne.

It was merged, along with Maryborough, into the Electoral district of Maryborough and Daylesford in 1927.

== Members for Daylesford ==
Member	Party	Term
James Wheeler	Unaligned	1889–1900
Donald McLeod	Liberal	1900–1917
Donald McLeod	Nationalist	1917–1923
James McDonald	Labor	1923*
Roderick McLeod	Nationalist	1923–1924
James McDonald	Labor	1924–1927

- In the 1923 by-election, James McDonald of Labor was initially declared the winner, but a later recount established that Roderick McLeod had won.

== See also ==
- Parliaments of the Australian states and territories
- List of members of the Victorian Legislative Assembly
