= Electoral district of Glenelg (Victoria) =

Former state electoral district of Victoria, Australia

Coordinates: 38°00′S 141°30′E

Glenelg Victoria—Legislative Assembly
- State: Victoria
- Created: 1904
- Abolished: 1927
- Demographic: Rural

Glenelg was an electoral district of the Legislative Assembly in the Australian state of Victoria based in far south-western Victoria from 1904 to 1927.

It was created after the Electoral district of Normanby was abolished by the Victorian Electoral Districts Boundaries Act 1903.

== Members for Glenelg ==
Member	Party	Term
Ewen Cameron	Unaligned	1904–1906
Hugh Campbell	Liberal	1906–1917
Hugh Campbell	Nationalist	1917–1920
William Thomas	Labor	1920–1924
Ernie Bond	Labor	1924–1927

After Glenelg was abolished in 1927, a new district, the Electoral district of Port Fairy and Glenelg was created. Ernest Bond, the last member for Glenelg, represented the new district of Port Fairy and Glenelg from 1927 to 1943.
