= James McDonald (Victorian Labor politician) =

Australian politician

James McDonald (13 August 1889 – 11 January 1938) was an Australian politician.

Born in Wallan, Victoria, to storekeeper John Roderick McDonald and Marion Frances Menere, he grew up in Wallan and farmed in the Kyneton-Woodend area dating back to 1910. During World War I, he served for two years with the Australian Imperial Force, during which time he was seriously wounded; after his return, he became president of the Woodend Returned and Services League. In August 1923, he was elected to the Victorian Legislative Assembly in a by-election for the seat of Daylesford, representing the Labor Party, but in September, he was defeated in a recount. At the 1924 state election, he won the seat again, but it was abolished in 1927 and McDonald tried but failed to win Mildura. From 1929 on, he lived in Adelaide, where he died after a long period of poor health in 1938.
