= David Gibson (Victorian politician) =

Australian politician

David Havelock Gibson (7 February 1873 – 27 April 1940) was an Australian politician.

Born in Havelock, Victoria to farmer David Gibson and Grace Gerrand, both Scottish-born, he was a wheat farmer and grazier for thirty-four years. His brother, William Gibson, was a prominent federal politician. Around 1909 he married Margaret Barbara McKenzie, with whom he had one daughter. From 1910 to 1922 he was a Leigh Shire councillor, serving as president from 1911 to 1913. In 1917 he was elected to the Victorian Legislative Assembly as the member for Grenville, a member of the newly political Victorian Farmers' Union, of which he became parliamentary secretary and whip. Joining the Country Party at its foundation in 1920, he was defeated in 1921 and became director of the Victorian Wheatgrowers' Corporation, a position he held until his death in 1940.
