= 1917 Victorian state election =

Australian state election

- 15 November 1917

All 65 seats in the Victorian Legislative Assembly 33 seats needed for a majority
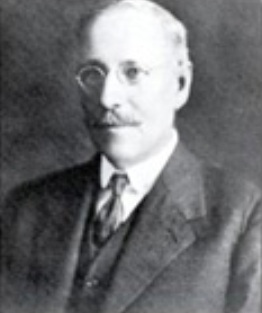

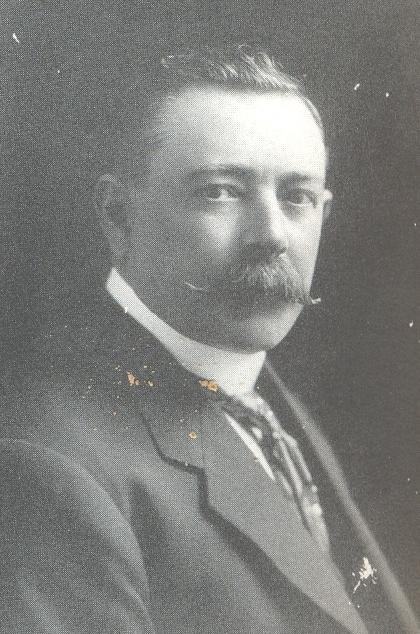

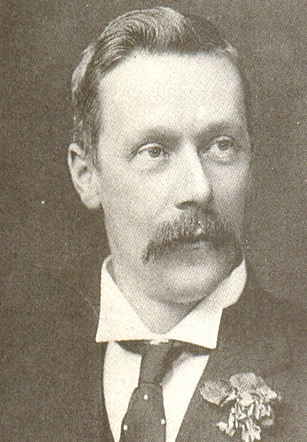
	First party	Second party	Third party
Leader	John Bowser	George Elmslie	Alexander Peacock
Party	Nationalist	Labor	Ministerialist
Leader since	November 1917	September 1913	June 1914
Leader's seat	Wangaratta	Albert Park	Allandale
Last election	New party	22 seats	43
Seats won	30	24	9 seats
Seat change	▲30	▲2	▼34
Percentage	49.95	32.29%	7.03
Swing	▲49.95	▼7.29	▼49.86
Premier before election
Alexander Peacock
Ministerial
Elected Premier
John Bowser
Nationalist

The 1917 Victorian state election was held in the Australian state of Victoria on Thursday 15 November 1917 for the state's Legislative Assembly. 51 of the 65 Legislative Assembly seats were contested.

== Background ==
By 1917, World War I was placing an enormous strain on the Victorian economy. While the Liberal party had won the 1914 election with a large majority, many in the party were becoming increasingly dissatisfied with the government's actions on difficulties in the rural areas. The Victorian Farmers' Union emerged as a party, was gathering support and ran candidates for the first time.

The Labor Party had undergone a split in 1916 over the Conscription debate and some of its pro-conscription members led by Prime Minister Billy Hughes left the party and joined with the Liberals to form the Nationalist Party. At the state level, however, some of these members ran as National Labor candidates.

The breaking point for the Nationalist government was Premier Alexander Peacock's decision to increase rail fares to rural areas. The party split into a pro-Peacock Ministerialist faction (mostly composed of city-based members), and an opposition faction led by John Bowser, composed mostly of country members. The two factions ran candidates against each other in most Nationalist seats. This did not effectively split the vote, as Victoria had introduced compulsory preferential voting for this election, and most of the preferences resulting from multiple Nationalist candidates were kept within the party. After the election, on 29 November, the rural faction of the Nationalist government led by Bowser won control of the party, ousting Peacock.

== Results ==
Fourteen seats were uncontested at this election, and were retained by the incumbent parties:

- Nationalist (7): Ballarat West, Castlemaine and Maldon, Gippsland West, Gunbower, Hawthorn, Lowan, Wangaratta
- Labor (6): Abbotsford, Carlton, Collingwood, Fitzroy, Melbourne, Richmond
- National Labor (1): Gippsland North

Legislative Assembly (IRV/CV)
Party	Votes	%	Swing	Seats	Change
Nationalist	172,837	49.95	+49.95	30	▲30
Labor	111,637	32.29	–7.29	24	▲2
Ministerialist	24,199	7.03	–49.86	9	▼34
Victorian Farmers	21,183	6.13	+6.13	4	▲4
National Labor	7,747	2.24	+2.24	4	▲4
Independent Labor	3,100	0.90	+0.90	0	Steady
Temperance	2,097	0.61	+0.61	0	Steady
Progressive Farmers	1,972	0.57	+0.57	0	Steady
Independent Nationalist	908	0.26	+0.26	0	Steady
Progressive Labor	74	0.02	+0.02	0	Steady
Formal votes	343,657	96.85			
Informal votes	11,245	3.15	+0.88		
Total	354,902	100.00		65	
Registered voters / turnout	658,488	54.21	+0.29		

== Aftermath ==
As the Bowser faction had won the most seats within the Nationalist party factions, Alexander Peacock resigned as Premier and John Bowser took his place. The previous government's increase on rail fares was reversed, but the issue of how the railways were to be financed remained unresolved. The opposition parties defeated a railway estimates bill in March 1918, and Bowser resigned as Premier in response, having little taste for the office. Bowser then eventually left the Nationalist party for the Victorian Farmers' Union. Peacock supporter Harry Lawson became Premier, after which the factions reunited and formed majority government with 40 of the 65 seats.

== See also ==
- Members of the Victorian Legislative Assembly, 1917–1920
- Candidates of the 1917 Victorian state election
