= 1924 Victorian state election =

Australian state election

- 26 June 1924

All 65 seats in the Victorian Legislative Assembly 33 seats needed for a majority
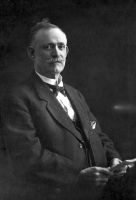

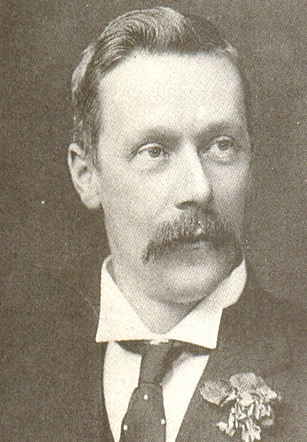

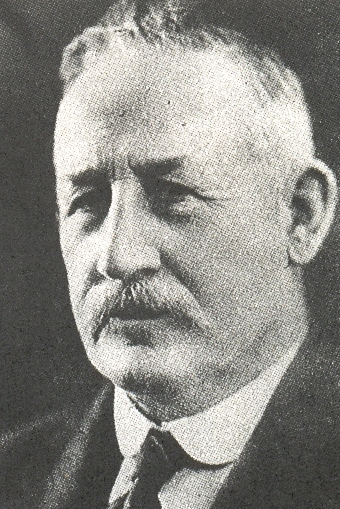
	First party	Second party	Third party
Leader	George Prendergast	Sir Alexander Peacock	John Allan
Party	Labor	Nationalist	Country
Leader since	18 June 1918	28 April 1924
Leader's seat	North Melbourne	Clunes and Allandale	Rodney
Last election	21 seats	31 seats	10 seats
Seats before	23 seats	28 seats	11 seats
Seats won	27 seats	19 seats	11 seats
Seat change	▲4	▼9	0
Percentage	34.87%	39.04%	8.83%
Swing	▼0.79	▼6.55	▼2.04
Premier before election
Sir Alexander Peacock
Nationalist
Elected Premier
George Prendergast
Labor

The 1924 Victorian state election was held in the Australian state of Victoria on Thursday 26 June 1924 to elect the 65 members of the state's Legislative Assembly.

== Background ==
=== Seat changes ===
There had been four by-elections in Nationalist-held seats during the previous parliamentary term: Labor had won the seats of Daylesford on 9 August 1923 and Dalhousie on 31 January 1924. The Nationalists retained the seat of Gippsland South on 18 August 1922, but lost Gippsland West to the Country Party.

== Results ==
=== Legislative Assembly ===
1924 Victorian state election Legislative Assembly << 1921–1927 >>
Enrolled voters	626,250				
Votes cast	370,963		Turnout	59.24	+1.97
Informal votes	3,739		Informal	1.01	+0.23
Summary of votes by party
Party	Primary votes	%	Swing	Seats	Change
Nationalist	143,379	39.04	−6.55	19	−9
Labor	128,056	34.87	−0.79	27	+4
Country	43,961	11.97	−2.04	13	0
Australian Liberal	23,062	6.28	+8.84	5	+5
Progressive Liberal	16,986	4.62	+4.62	0	0
Independent	11,780	3.21	−1.52	1	0
Total	367,224			65	

Notes:

- Twenty seats were uncontested at this election, and were retained by the incumbent parties:
  - Labor (12): Abbotsford, Brunswick, Carlton, Collingwood, Fitzroy, Flemington, North Melbourne, Port Fairy, Port Melbourne, Richmond, Warrenheip, Williamstown
  - Nationalist (5): Allandale, Gippsland South, Kara Kara, St Kilda, Waranga
  - Country (3): Gippsland East, Goulburn Valley, Wangaratta

== Outcome ==
The Peacock minority government was defeated; a minority Labor Government led by George Prendergast took office but was defeated in Parliament in November 1924 by the Allan Coalition Government.

== See also ==
- Candidates of the 1924 Victorian state election
- Members of the Victorian Legislative Assembly, 1924–1927
