= Results of the 1921 Victorian state election (Legislative Assembly) =

Australian state election results

Victorian state election, 30 August 1921 Legislative Assembly << 1920–1924 >>
Enrolled voters	569,704				
Votes cast	326,227		Turnout	57.26	−6.44
Informal votes	2,555		Informal	0.78	−3.61
Summary of votes by party
Party	Primary votes	%	Swing	Seats	Change
Nationalist	147,569	45.59	−2.36	31	+1
Labor	115,432	34.87	+6.38	21	+1
Victorian Farmers	45,348	14.01	−0.40	12	−1
Independent	15,323	4.73	−1.52	1	0
Total	326,227			65	

This is a list of electoral district results for the 1921 Victorian state election.

== Results by electoral district ==
=== Abbotsford ===
1921 Victorian state election: Abbotsford
Party	Candidate	Votes	%	±%
Labor	Gordon Webber	unopposed		
Labor hold		Swing		

=== Albert Park ===
1921 Victorian state election: Albert Park
Party	Candidate	Votes	%	±%
Labor	Arthur Wallace	5,882	53.3	−3.2
Nationalist	William Hug	5,164	46.7	+46.7
Total formal votes		11,046	99.7	+0.8
Informal votes		30	0.3	−0.8
Turnout		11,076	53.3	−8.2
Labor hold		Swing	N/A	

=== Allandale ===
1921 Victorian state election: Allandale
Party	Candidate	Votes	%	±%
Nationalist	Alexander Peacock	2,538	72.1	−27.9
Labor	Robert Miller	984	27.9	+27.9
Total formal votes		3,522	99.4	
Informal votes		23	0.6	
Turnout		3,545	64.8	
Nationalist hold		Swing	N/A	

=== Ballarat East ===
1921 Victorian state election: Ballarat East
Party	Candidate	Votes	%	±%
Nationalist	Robert McGregor	4,055	59.2	+5.1
Labor	John Kean	2,797	40.8	−5.1
Total formal votes		6,852	99.2	+1.7
Informal votes		53	0.8	−1.7
Turnout		6,905	71.2	−3.5
Nationalist hold		Swing	+5.1	

=== Ballarat West ===
1921 Victorian state election: Ballarat West
Party	Candidate	Votes	%	±%
Nationalist	Matthew Baird	4,622	67.2	+9.7
Labor	Thomas Wilson	2,255	32.8	+32.8
Total formal votes		6,877	99.7	+0.4
Informal votes		23	0.3	−0.4
Turnout		6,900	67.4	−8.9
Nationalist hold		Swing	N/A	

=== Barwon ===
1921 Victorian state election: Barwon
Party	Candidate	Votes	%	±%
Nationalist	Edward Morley	3,117	40.0	+4.7
Ind. Nationalist	Duncan McLennan	1,789	23.0	+23.0
Labor	Herbert Wookey	1,484	19.1	+19.1
Victorian Farmers	James Farrer	1,375	17.7	−4.7
Total formal votes		7,765	98.5	+3.7
Informal votes		122	1.5	−3.7
Turnout		7,887	65.5	−3.8
Two-candidate-preferred result
Nationalist	Edward Morley	4,486	63.9	+14.3
Ind. Nationalist	Duncan McLennan	3,279	36.1	−14.3
Nationalist gain from Ind. Nationalist		Swing	+14.3	

- Edward Morley was elected in the 1920 election as an Independent Nationalist, but joined the Nationalists before this election.

=== Benalla ===
1921 Victorian state election: Benalla
Party	Candidate	Votes	%	±%
Victorian Farmers	John Carlisle	2,912	64.8	−1.2
Nationalist	Alfred Manning	1,582	35.2	+1.2
Total formal votes		4,494	98.8	+3.3
Informal votes		55	1.2	−3.3
Turnout		4,549	57.4	−1.9
Victorian Farmers hold		Swing	−1.2	

=== Benambra ===
1921 Victorian state election: Benambra
Party	Candidate	Votes	%	±%
Nationalist	Henry Beardmore	unopposed		
Nationalist hold		Swing		

=== Bendigo East ===
1921 Victorian state election: Bendigo East
Party	Candidate	Votes	%	±%
Labor	Luke Clough	3,250	60.0	+1.4
Nationalist	Tom Brennan	2,163	40.0	−1.4
Total formal votes		5,413	99.3	+1.0
Informal votes		39	0.7	−1.0
Turnout		5,452	61.9	−9.1
Labor hold		Swing	+1.4	

=== Bendigo West ===
1921 Victorian state election: Bendigo West
Party	Candidate	Votes	%	±%
Nationalist	David Smith	3,259	52.6	+14.1
Labor	Thomas Jude	2,937	47.4	+10.5
Total formal votes		6,196	99.5	+4.2
Informal votes		34	0.5	−4.2
Turnout		6,230	66.1	−5.6
Nationalist hold		Swing	+1.7	

=== Boroondara ===
1921 Victorian state election: Boroondara
Party	Candidate	Votes	%	±%
Nationalist	Edmund Greenwood	unopposed		
Nationalist hold		Swing		

=== Borung ===
1921 Victorian state election: Borung
Party	Candidate	Votes	%	±%
Victorian Farmers	David Allison	2,938	52.6	+0.4
Nationalist	William Hutchinson	2,652	47.4	−0.4
Total formal votes		5,590	99.5	+1.6
Informal votes		31	0.5	−1.6
Turnout		5,621	71.8	+1.0
Victorian Farmers hold		Swing	+0.4	

=== Brighton ===
1921 Victorian state election: Brighton
Party	Candidate	Votes	%	±%
Nationalist	Oswald Snowball	unopposed		
Nationalist hold		Swing		

=== Brunswick ===
1921 Victorian state election: Brunswick
Party	Candidate	Votes	%	±%
Labor	James Jewell	7,369	64.2	+0.9
Nationalist	John March	4,104	35.8	−0.9
Total formal votes		11,473	99.4	+0.5
Informal votes		67	0.6	−0.5
Turnout		11,540	46.1	−15.2
Labor hold		Swing	+0.9	

=== Bulla ===
1921 Victorian state election: Bulla
Party	Candidate	Votes	%	±%
Nationalist	Andrew Robertson	unopposed		
Nationalist hold		Swing		

=== Carlton ===
1921 Victorian state election: Carlton
Party	Candidate	Votes	%	±%
Labor	Robert Solly	unopposed		
Labor hold		Swing		

=== Castlemaine and Maldon ===
1921 Victorian state election: Castlemaine and Maldon
Party	Candidate	Votes	%	±%
Nationalist	Harry Lawson	3,201	74.2	+6.2
Labor	Percy Clarey	1,113	25.8	−6.2
Total formal votes		4,314	99.5	+0.6
Informal votes		23	0.5	−0.6
Turnout		4,337	65.5	−7.8

=== Collingwood ===
1921 Victorian state election: Collingwood
Party	Candidate	Votes	%	±%
Labor	Tom Tunnecliffe	5,313	56.4	+8.8
Independent Labor	Martin Hannah	2,437	25.9	−2.2
Nationalist	Alexander Young	876	9.3	−15.0
Independent	James Reid	786	8.3	+8.3
Total formal votes		9,412	98.1	+4.8
Informal votes		183	1.9	−4.8
Turnout		9,595	64.9	−4.3
Two-candidate-preferred result
Labor	Tom Tunnecliffe		58.2	+8.7
Independent Labor	Martin Hannah		41.8	−8.7
Labor gain from Independent Labor		Swing	+8.7	

- Two candidate preferred vote was estimated.

=== Dalhousie ===
1921 Victorian state election: Dalhousie
Party	Candidate	Votes	%	±%
Nationalist	Allan Cameron	unopposed		
Nationalist hold		Swing		

=== Dandenong ===
1921 Victorian state election: Dandenong
Party	Candidate	Votes	%	±%
Nationalist	Frank Groves	5,538	68.7	+13.3
Labor	Roy Beardsworth	2,519	31.3	+6.4
Total formal votes		8,057	99.4	+8.2
Informal votes		48	0.6	−8.2
Turnout		8,105	45.7	−10.4
Nationalist hold		Swing	−4.5	

=== Daylesford ===
1921 Victorian state election: Daylesford
Party	Candidate	Votes	%	±%
Nationalist	Donald McLeod	2,300	58.1	−5.2
Labor	James McDonald	1,657	41.9	+41.9
Total formal votes		18	0.4	+3.8
Informal votes		18	0.4	−3.8
Turnout		3,975	62.1	−1.1
Nationalist hold		Swing	N/A	

=== Dundas ===
1921 Victorian state election: Dundas
Party	Candidate	Votes	%	±%
Labor	Bill Slater	3,335	59.5	−5.0
Nationalist	Sidney Officer	2,267	40.5	+5.0
Total formal votes		5,602	99.0	+3.9
Informal votes		57	1.0	−3.9
Turnout		5,659	68.9	−1.5
Labor hold		Swing	−5.0	

=== Eaglehawk ===
1921 Victorian state election: Eaglehawk
Party	Candidate	Votes	%	±%
Victorian Farmers	Albert Dunstan	1,795	37.3	+4.4
Labor	Thomas Gamboni	1,484	30.8	−16.4
Nationalist	Edward Heitmann	1,027	21.3	+1.5
Independent	William Wallace	419	8.7	+8.7
Independent	William Dunstan	91	1.9	+1.9
Total formal votes		4,816	98.1	+2.5
Informal votes		92	1.9	−2.5
Turnout		4,908	76.5	−1.2
Two-party-preferred result
Victorian Farmers	Albert Dunstan	3,077	63.9	+13.8
Labor	Thomas Gamboni	1,739	36.1	−13.8
Victorian Farmers hold		Swing	+13.8	

=== East Melbourne ===
1921 Victorian state election: East Melbourne
Party	Candidate	Votes	%	±%
Nationalist	Alfred Farthing	2,810	54.3	−22.8
Labor	Michael Collins	2,363	45.7	+5.1
Total formal votes		5,173	99.4	+6.5
Informal votes		29	0.6	−6.5
Turnout		5,202	42.6	−12.6
Nationalist hold		Swing	N/A	

=== Essendon ===
1921 Victorian state election: Essendon
Party	Candidate	Votes	%	±%
Nationalist	Thomas Ryan	10,254	55.9	−1.4
Labor	Alexander Taylor	8,093	44.1	+1.4
Total formal votes		18,347	99.7	+0.7
Informal votes		58	0.3	−0.7
Turnout		18,405	58.1	−7.2
Nationalist hold		Swing	−1.4	

=== Evelyn ===
1921 Victorian state election: Evelyn
Party	Candidate	Votes	%	±%
Nationalist	William Everard	4,624	81.0	+31.9
Labor	Arthur Jones	1,085	19.0	+3.9
Total formal votes		5,709	99.4	+6.1
Informal votes		37	0.6	−6.1
Turnout		5,746	47.3	−18.0
Nationalist hold		Swing	N/A	

=== Fitzroy ===
1921 Victorian state election: Fitzroy
Party	Candidate	Votes	%	±%
Labor	John Billson	3,946	67.0	−5.9
Nationalist	Albert Kemp	1,940	33.0	+5.9
Total formal votes		5,886	99.3	+1.7
Informal votes		40	0.7	−1.7
Turnout		5,926	40.2	−18.5
Labor hold		Swing	−5.9	

=== Flemington ===
1921 Victorian state election: Flemington
Party	Candidate	Votes	%	±%
Labor	Edward Warde	6,447	65.2	
Nationalist	Francis Clarey	3,433	34.8	
Total formal votes		9,880	99.1	
Informal votes		91	0.9	
Turnout		9,971	42.0	
Labor hold		Swing	N/A	

=== Geelong ===
1921 Victorian state election: Geelong
Party	Candidate	Votes	%	±%
Labor	William Brownbill	5,316	54.8	−1.8
Nationalist	William Thwaites	4,391	45.2	+1.8
Total formal votes		9,707	99.3	+4.0
Informal votes		73	0.7	−4.0
Turnout		9,780	65.2	−9.3
Labor hold		Swing	−1.8	

=== Gippsland East ===
1921 Victorian state election: Gippsland East
Party	Candidate	Votes	%	±%
Victorian Farmers	Albert Lind	2,659	62.9	+19.7
Nationalist	John Jeffers	1,567	37.1	+1.0
Total formal votes		4,226	99.4	+5.5
Informal votes		25	0.6	−5.5
Turnout		4,251	69.2	+4.2
Victorian Farmers hold		Swing	+2.6	

=== Gippsland North ===
1921 Victorian state election: Gippsland North
Party	Candidate	Votes	%	±%
Independent	James McLachlan	4,171	77.9	+4.2
Labor	James Bermingham	1,183	22.1	+22.1
Total formal votes		5,354	99.2	+5.2
Informal votes		43	0.8	−5.2
Turnout		5,397	59.2	−10.8
Independent gain from Nationalist		Swing	N/A	

=== Gippsland South ===
1921 Victorian state election: Gippsland South
Party	Candidate	Votes	%	±%
Nationalist	Thomas Livingston	2,980	63.3	+5.5
Victorian Farmers	David White	1,725	36.7	−5.5
Total formal votes		4,705	99.6	+3.0
Informal votes		19	0.4	−3.0
Turnout		4,724	48.7	−10.7
Nationalist hold		Swing	+5.5	

=== Gippsland West ===
1921 Victorian state election: Gippsland West
Party	Candidate	Votes	%	±%
Nationalist	John Mackey	unopposed		
Nationalist hold		Swing		

=== Glenelg ===
1921 Victorian state election: Glenelg
Party	Candidate	Votes	%	±%
Labor	William Thomas	3,526	53.1	+9.0
Nationalist	Hugh Campbell	3,111	46.9	+14.5
Total formal votes		6,637	99.5	+3.6
Informal votes		34	0.5	−3.6
Turnout		6,671	75.3	−0.3
Labor hold		Swing	+2.7	

=== Goulburn Valley ===
1921 Victorian state election: Goulburn Valley
Party	Candidate	Votes	%	±%
Victorian Farmers	Murray Bourchier	3,482	53.0	+2.5
Nationalist	John Mitchell	3,089	47.0	−2.5
Total formal votes		6,571	99.5	+4.7
Informal votes		33	0.5	−4.7
Turnout		6,604	74.5	+5.2
Victorian Farmers hold		Swing	+2.5	

=== Grenville ===
1921 Victorian state election: Grenville
Party	Candidate	Votes	%	±%
Labor	Arthur Hughes	1,593	44.6	−2.1
Nationalist	George Turner	1,111	31.1	+31.1
Victorian Farmers	David Gibson	868	24.3	−29.0
Total formal votes		3,572	99.0	+3.3
Informal votes		36	1.0	−3.3
Turnout		3,608	74.9	−6.5
Two-party-preferred result
Labor	Arthur Hughes	1,968	55.1	+8.4
Nationalist	George Turner	1,604	44.9	+44.9
Labor gain from Victorian Farmers		Swing	N/A	

=== Gunbower ===
1921 Victorian state election: Gunbower
Party	Candidate	Votes	%	±%
Nationalist	Henry Angus	3,479	56.4	−2.1
Victorian Farmers	Ogilvie Watson	2,692	43.6	+2.1
Total formal votes		6,171	99.4	+2.9
Informal votes		38	0.6	−2.9
Turnout		6,209	69.3	−3.8
Nationalist hold		Swing	−2.1	

=== Hampden ===
1921 Victorian state election: Hampden
Party	Candidate	Votes	%	±%
Nationalist	David Oman	3,743	55.2	−5.7
Labor	Hugh Meagher	1,812	26.7	+26.7
Victorian Farmers	Martin Brennan	1,231	18.1	−21.0
Total formal votes		6,786	98.5	+4.1
Informal votes		107	1.5	−4.1
Turnout		6,893	60.7	−0.4
Two-party-preferred result
Nationalist	David Oman		68.8	
Labor	Hugh Meagher		31.2	
Nationalist hold		Swing	N/A	

- Two party preferred vote was estimated.

=== Hawthorn ===
1921 Victorian state election: Hawthorn
Party	Candidate	Votes	%	±%
Nationalist	William McPherson	unopposed		
Nationalist hold		Swing		

=== Jika Jika ===
1921 Victorian state election: Jika Jika
Party	Candidate	Votes	%	±%
Labor	John Cain	9,668	54.5	−5.0
Nationalist	Joseph Eller	8,060	45.5	+5.0
Total formal votes		17,728	99.6	+0.5
Informal votes		80	0.4	−0.5
Turnout		17,808	51.0	−12.8
Labor hold		Swing	−5.0	

=== Kara Kara ===
1921 Victorian state election: Kara Kara
Party	Candidate	Votes	%	±%
Nationalist	John Pennington	2,436	48.8	−5.7
Victorian Farmers	Alexander Cameron	1,583	31.7	−13.8
Labor	Alfred Pearce	973	19.5	+19.5
Total formal votes		4,992	99.1	+0.6
Informal votes		48	0.9	−0.6
Turnout		5,040	82.9	+4.3
Two-candidate-preferred result
Nationalist	John Pennington	2,675	53.6	−0.9
Victorian Farmers	Alexander Cameron	2,317	46.4	+0.9
Nationalist hold		Swing	−0.9	

=== Korong ===
1921 Victorian state election: Korong
Party	Candidate	Votes	%	±%
Victorian Farmers	Isaac Weaver	2,835	61.9	−18.8
Nationalist	Peter Hansen	1,742	38.1	+18.8
Total formal votes		4,577	99.4	+5.1
Informal votes		30	0.6	−5.1
Turnout		4,607	67.4	+3.7
Victorian Farmers hold		Swing	−18.8	

=== Lowan ===
1921 Victorian state election: Lowan
Party	Candidate	Votes	%	±%
Victorian Farmers	Marcus Wettenhall	3,320	50.2	−4.4
Nationalist	James Menzies	3,295	49.8	+4.4
Total formal votes		6,615	99.3	+2.4
Informal votes		45	0.7	−2.4
Turnout		6,657	69.7	+2.0
Victorian Farmers hold		Swing	−4.4	

=== Maryborough ===
1921 Victorian state election: Maryborough
Party	Candidate	Votes	%	±%
Labor	George Frost	2,837	56.0	+7.4
Nationalist	James Holland	2,229	44.0	+9.5
Total formal votes		5,066	99.6	+5.6
Informal votes		20	0.4	−5.6
Turnout		5,086	76.3	+2.7
Labor hold		Swing	+4.4	

=== Melbourne ===
1921 Victorian state election: Melbourne
Party	Candidate	Votes	%	±%
Labor	Alexander Rogers	unopposed		
Labor hold		Swing		

=== Mornington ===
1921 Victorian state election: Mornington
Party	Candidate	Votes	%	±%
Victorian Farmers	Alfred Downward	3,485	47.4	−12.7
Nationalist	William Cook	2,333	31.8	−8.1
Ind. Nationalist	Albert Sambell	1,526	20.8	+20.8
Total formal votes		7,344	97.5	+3.3
Informal votes		192	2.5	−3.3
Turnout		7,536	47.9	−8.7
Two-candidate-preferred result
Victorian Farmers	Alfred Downward	3,827	52.1	−8.0
Nationalist	Arthur Leadbeater	3,356	39.9	+8.0
Victorian Farmers hold		Swing	−8.0	

=== North Melbourne ===
1921 Victorian state election: North Melbourne
Party	Candidate	Votes	%	±%
Labor	George Prendergast	unopposed		
Labor hold		Swing		

=== Ovens ===
1921 Victorian state election: Ovens
Party	Candidate	Votes	%	±%
Nationalist	Alfred Billson	unopposed		
Nationalist hold		Swing		

=== Polwarth ===
1921 Victorian state election: Polwarth
Party	Candidate	Votes	%	±%
Nationalist	James McDonald	4,311	59.3	+16.2
Labor	John Linahan	2,955	40.7	+4.7
Total formal votes		7,266	99.4	+3.7
Informal votes		43	0.6	−3.7
Turnout		7,309	64.6	−7.5
Nationalist hold		Swing	+2.3	

=== Port Fairy ===
1921 Victorian state election: Port Fairy
Party	Candidate	Votes	%	±%
Labor	Henry Bailey	3,438	73.8	−26.2
Nationalist	William Downing	1,222	26.2	+26.2
Total formal votes		4,660	99.3	
Informal votes		35	0.7	
Turnout		4,695	58.3	
Labor hold		Swing	N/A	

=== Port Melbourne ===
1921 Victorian state election: Port Melbourne
Party	Candidate	Votes	%	±%
Labor	James Murphy	unopposed		
Labor hold		Swing		

=== Prahran ===
1921 Victorian state election: Prahran
Party	Candidate	Votes	%	±%
Nationalist	Richard Fetherston	5,815	50.6	+2.1
Labor	Alexander Parker	5,668	49.4	−2.1
Total formal votes		11,483	99.3	+0.2
Informal votes		86	0.7	−0.2
Turnout		11,569	54.8	−6.0
Nationalist gain from Labor		Swing	+2.1	

=== Richmond ===
1921 Victorian state election: Richmond
Party	Candidate	Votes	%	±%
Labor	Ted Cotter	unopposed		
Labor hold		Swing		

=== Rodney ===
1921 Victorian state election: Rodney
Party	Candidate	Votes	%	±%
Victorian Farmers	John Allan	4,338	58.1	−10.3
Nationalist	Hugh McKenzie	3,125	41.9	+10.3
Total formal votes		7,463	99.1	+3.8
Informal votes		71	0.9	−3.8
Turnout		7,534	66.1	+1.6
Victorian Farmers hold		Swing	−10.3	

=== St Kilda ===
1921 Victorian state election: St Kilda
Party	Candidate	Votes	%	±%
Nationalist	Frederic Eggleston	10,104	74.8	+49.1
Labor	Walter Gorman	3,399	25.2	+3.5
Total formal votes		13,503	99.6	+6.5
Informal votes		55	0.4	−6.5
Turnout		13,558	39.8	−15.1
Nationalist hold		Swing	N/A	

=== Stawell and Ararat ===
1921 Victorian state election: Stawell and Ararat
Party	Candidate	Votes	%	±%
Nationalist	Richard Toutcher	3,115	57.2	−4.2
Labor	Francis Brophy	2,333	42.8	+4.2
Total formal votes		5,448	99.5	+5.4
Informal votes		30	0.5	−5.4
Turnout		5,478	68.7	+1.2
Nationalist hold		Swing	−4.2	

=== Swan Hill ===
1921 Victorian state election: Swan Hill
Party	Candidate	Votes	%	±%
Victorian Farmers	Francis Old	6,360	73.1	−2.9
Nationalist	Royden Patterson	2,340	26.9	+2.9
Total formal votes		8,700	98.9	+5.1
Informal votes		94	1.1	−5.1
Turnout		8,794	48.5	−2.4
Victorian Farmers hold		Swing	−2.9	

=== Toorak ===
1921 Victorian state election: Toorak
Party	Candidate	Votes	%	±%
Nationalist	Stanley Argyle	unopposed		
Nationalist hold		Swing		

=== Upper Goulburn ===
1921 Victorian state election: Upper Goulburn
Party	Candidate	Votes	%	±%
Labor	Christopher Gleeson	1,757	33.9	−1.6
Victorian Farmers	Edwin Mackrell	1,750	33.8	−0.2
Nationalist	John Leckie	1,678	32.4	+1.9
Total formal votes		5,185	98.2	+3.3
Informal votes		97	1.8	−3.3
Turnout		5,282	65.1	+1.7
Two-party-preferred result
Victorian Farmers	Edwin Mackrell	3,198	61.7	+3.6
Labor	Christopher Gleeson	1,987	38.3	−3.6
Victorian Farmers hold		Swing	+3.6	

=== Walhalla ===
1921 Victorian state election: Walhalla
Party	Candidate	Votes	%	±%
Nationalist	Samuel Barnes	unopposed		
Nationalist hold		Swing		

=== Wangaratta ===
1921 Victorian state election: Wangaratta
Party	Candidate	Votes	%	±%
Victorian Farmers	John Bowser	unopposed		
Victorian Farmers hold		Swing		

=== Waranga ===
1921 Victorian state election: Waranga
Party	Candidate	Votes	%	±%
Nationalist	John Gordon	unopposed		
Nationalist hold		Swing		

=== Warrenheip ===
1921 Victorian state election: Warrenheip
Party	Candidate	Votes	%	±%
Labor	Edmond Hogan	2,325	63.6	−36.4
Nationalist	James Ryan	1,330	36.4	+36.4
Total formal votes		3,655	98.8	
Informal votes		44	1.2	
Turnout		3,699	65.4	
Labor hold		Swing	N/A	

=== Warrnambool ===
1921 Victorian state election: Warrnambool
Party	Candidate	Votes	%	±%
Nationalist	James Deany	3,541	60.2	+18.6
Labor	Fred Katz	2,336	39.8	+2.0
Total formal votes		5,877	99.5	+4.9
Informal votes		27	0.5	−4.9
Turnout		5,904	65.4	−6.9
Nationalist hold		Swing	+4.3	

=== Williamstown ===
1921 Victorian state election: Williamstown
Party	Candidate	Votes	%	±%
Labor	John Lemmon	unopposed		
Labor hold		Swing		

== See also ==
- 1921 Victorian state election
- Candidates of the 1921 Victorian state election
- Members of the Victorian Legislative Assembly, 1921–1924
