= Results of the 1920 Victorian state election (Legislative Assembly) =

Australian state election results

1920 Victorian state election Legislative Assembly << 1917–1921 >>
Enrolled voters	735,054				
Votes cast	468,223		Turnout	63.70	+9.49
Informal votes	20,593		Informal	4.40	+1.25
Summary of votes by party
Party	Primary votes	%	Swing	Seats	Change
Nationalist	214,650	47.95	−9.03	30	–10
Labor	131,083	29.28	–3.00	20	+2
Victorian Farmers	64,500	14.41	+8.28	13	+9
Ind. Nationalist	22,448	5.01	*	1	+1
Independent	14,949	3.34	+0.98	1	+1
Total	447,630			65	

This is a list of electoral district results for the 1920 Victorian state election.

== Results by electoral district ==
=== Abbotsford ===
1920 Victorian state election: Abbotsford
Party	Candidate	Votes	%	±%
Labor	Gordon Webber	unopposed		
Labor hold		Swing		

=== Albert Park ===
1920 Victorian state election: Albert Park
Party	Candidate	Votes	%	±%
Labor	Arthur Wallace	7,396	56.5	−0.8
Independent	James Morris	5,705	43.5	+43.5
Total formal votes		13,101	98.9	+2.7
Informal votes		145	1.1	−2.7
Turnout		13,246	61.5	+2.3
Labor hold		Swing	N/A	

=== Allandale ===
1920 Victorian state election: Allandale
Party	Candidate	Votes	%	±%
Nationalist	Alexander Peacock	unopposed		
Nationalist hold		Swing		

=== Ballarat East ===
1920 Victorian state election: Ballarat East
Party	Candidate	Votes	%	±%
Nationalist	Robert McGregor	3,952	54.1	−1.2
Labor	Walter Dalton	3,357	45.9	+1.2
Total formal votes		7,309	97.5	+0.5
Informal votes		189	2.5	−0.5
Turnout		7,498	74.7	+4.1
Nationalist hold		Swing	−1.2	

=== Ballarat West ===
1920 Victorian state election: Ballarat West
Party	Candidate	Votes	%	±%
Nationalist	Matthew Baird	4,567	57.5	
Independent	Charles Brind	3,372	42.5	+42.5
Total formal votes		7,939	99.3	
Informal votes		59	0.7	
Turnout		7,998	76.3	
Nationalist hold		Swing	N/A	

=== Barwon ===
1920 Victorian state election: Barwon
Party	Candidate	Votes	%	±%
Ind. Nationalist	Edward Morley	3,281	42.3	+42.3
Nationalist	Duncan McLennan	2,743	35.3	−3.8
Victorian Farmers	Herbert Lumb	1,739	22.4	−10.0
Total formal votes		7,763	94.8	−1.4
Informal votes		424	5.2	+1.4
Turnout		8,187	69.3	+20.0
Two-candidate-preferred result
Ind. Nationalist	Edward Morley	3,912	50.4	+50.4
Nationalist	Duncan McLennan	3,851	49.6	−0.5
Ind. Nationalist gain from Nationalist		Swing	N/A	

=== Benalla ===
1920 Victorian state election: Benalla
Party	Candidate	Votes	%	±%
Victorian Farmers	John Carlisle	2,937	66.0	+66.0
Nationalist	Robert Lewers	1,512	34.0	−28.3
Total formal votes		4,449	95.5	−1.8
Informal votes		208	4.5	+1.8
Turnout		4,657	59.3	−4.0
Victorian Farmers gain from Nationalist		Swing	N/A	

- John Carlisle was the sitting Nationalist MP for Benalla, but changed to the Victorian Farmers Union before this election.

=== Benambra ===
1920 Victorian state election: Benambra
Party	Candidate	Votes	%	±%
Nationalist	Henry Beardmore	2,928	86.5	+37.5
Ind. Nationalist	Edward Clutterbuck	455	13.5	+13.5
Total formal votes		3,383	91.4	−5.2
Informal votes		320	8.6	+5.2
Turnout		3,703	56.0	+4.8
Nationalist hold		Swing	N/A	

=== Bendigo East ===
1920 Victorian state election: Bendigo East
Party	Candidate	Votes	%	±%
Labor	Luke Clough	3,409	58.6	+3.5
Nationalist	Edwin Ham	2,410	41.4	−3.5
Total formal votes		5,819	98.3	+0.6
Informal votes		103	1.7	−0.6
Turnout		5,922	71.0	+5.1
Labor hold		Swing	+3.5	

=== Bendigo West ===
1920 Victorian state election: Bendigo West
Party	Candidate	Votes	%	±%
Nationalist	David Smith	2,408	38.4	−21.4
Labor	Thomas Jude	2,322	37.1	−3.1
Independent	David Andrew	1,537	24.5	+24.5
Total formal votes		6,267	95.3	−2.4
Informal votes		308	4.7	+2.4
Turnout		6,575	71.7	+11.4
Two-party-preferred result
Nationalist	David Smith	3,173	50.9	−8.9
Labor	Thomas Jude	3,058	49.1	+8.9
Nationalist hold		Swing	−8.9	

=== Boroondara ===
1920 Victorian state election: Boroondara
Party	Candidate	Votes	%	±%
Nationalist	Edmund Greenwood	16,885	61.5	+18.6
Nationalist	George Palmer	6,721	24.5	+24.5
Labor	William Wilcock	3,858	14.0	+14.0
Total formal votes		27,464	93.6	−3.2
Informal votes		573	6.4	+3.2
Turnout		29,340	60.5	+14.8
Nationalist hold		Swing	N/A	

=== Borung ===
1920 Victorian state election: Borung
Party	Candidate	Votes	%	±%
Victorian Farmers	David Allison	2,788	52.2	+3.8
Nationalist	William Hutchinson	2,557	47.8	−3.8
Total formal votes		5,345	97.9	+1.3
Informal votes		114	2.1	−1.3
Turnout		5,459	70.8	+9.7
Victorian Farmers gain from Nationalist		Swing	+3.8	

=== Brighton ===
1920 Victorian state election: Brighton
Party	Candidate	Votes	%	±%
Nationalist	Oswald Snowball	8,658	64.9	−9.0
Nationalist	Robert Stephenson	4,685	35.1	+35.1
Total formal votes		13,343	94.0	−2.7
Informal votes		851	6.0	+2.7
Turnout		14,194	54.7	+6.7
Nationalist hold		Swing	N/A	

=== Brunswick ===
1920 Victorian state election: Brunswick
Party	Candidate	Votes	%	±%
Labor	James Jewell	9,764	63.3	−3.9
Nationalist	Albert Batley	5,663	36.7	+9.9
Total formal votes		15,427	98.9	+2.1
Informal votes		165	1.1	−2.1
Turnout		15,592	61.3	+12.1
Labor hold		Swing	−8.5	

=== Bulla ===
1920 Victorian state election: Bulla
Party	Candidate	Votes	%	±%
Nationalist	Andrew Robertson	4,118	67.0	+1.8
Victorian Farmers	Michael McGuinness	2,030	33.0	−1.8
Total formal votes		6,148	92.6	−5.0
Informal votes		490	7.4	+5.0
Turnout		6,638	58.4	+8.8
Nationalist hold		Swing	+1.8	

=== Carlton ===
1920 Victorian state election: Carlton
Party	Candidate	Votes	%	±%
Labor	Robert Solly	unopposed		
Labor hold		Swing		

=== Castlemaine and Maldon ===
1920 Victorian state election: Castlemaine and Maldon
Party	Candidate	Votes	%	±%
Nationalist	Harry Lawson	3,258	68.0	
Labor	Christopher Bennett	1,531	32.0	+32.0
Total formal votes		4,789	98.9	
Informal votes		53	1.1	
Turnout		4,842	73.3	
Nationalist hold		Swing	N/A	

=== Collingwood ===
1920 Victorian state election: Collingwood
Party	Candidate	Votes	%	±%
Labor	Thomas McAllen	4,732	47.6	
Independent Labor	Martin Hannah	2,793	28.1	
Nationalist	Harry Evans	2,417	24.3	
Total formal votes		9,942	93.3	
Informal votes		714	6.7	
Turnout		10,656	69.2	
Two-candidate-preferred result
Independent Labor	Martin Hannah	5,017	50.5	
Labor	Thomas McAllen	4,925	49.5	
Independent Labor gain from Labor		Swing	N/A	

=== Dalhousie ===
1920 Victorian state election: Dalhousie
Party	Candidate	Votes	%	±%
Nationalist	Allan Cameron	2,482	47.0	+10.9
Victorian Farmers	Thomas Paterson	1,927	36.5	+36.5
Ind. Nationalist	Robert Mitchell	875	16.5	+16.5
Total formal votes		5,284	95.0	−2.5
Informal votes		280	5.0	+2.5
Turnout		5,564	78.9	+4.2
Two-candidate-preferred result
Nationalist	Allan Cameron	2,857	54.1	
Victorian Farmers	Thomas Paterson	2,427	45.9	
Nationalist hold		Swing	N/A	

=== Dandenong ===
1920 Victorian state election: Dandenong
Party	Candidate	Votes	%	±%
Nationalist	Frank Groves	4,982	55.4	−3.2
Labor	Roy Beardsworth	2,236	24.9	+24.9
Victorian Farmers	Peter Gleeson	1,778	19.8	+19.8
Total formal votes		8,996	91.2	−6.1
Informal votes		864	8.8	+6.1
Turnout		9,860	56.1	+12.6
Two-party-preferred result
Nationalist	Frank Groves		73.2	
Labor	Roy Beardsworth		26.8	
Nationalist hold		Swing	N/A	

- Two party preferred was estimated.

=== Daylesford ===
1920 Victorian state election: Daylesford
Party	Candidate	Votes	%	±%
Nationalist	Donald McLeod	2,433	63.2	+7.3
Nationalist	Henry Taylor	1,419	36.8	+36.8
Total formal votes		3,852	95.8	−1.1
Informal votes		171	4.2	+1.1
Turnout		4,023	63.2	−6.2
Nationalist hold		Swing	N/A	

=== Dundas ===
1920 Victorian state election: Dundas
Party	Candidate	Votes	%	±%
Labor	Bill Slater	3,560	64.5	+17.7
Victorian Farmers	William Nankervis	1,963	35.5	+35.5
Total formal votes		5,523	95.1	−1.3
Informal votes		287	4.9	+1.3
Turnout		5,810	70.4	+12.8
Labor hold		Swing	+13.8	

=== Eaglehawk ===
1920 Victorian state election: Eaglehawk
Party	Candidate	Votes	%	±%
Labor	Tom Tunnecliffe	2,302	47.2	+2.6
Victorian Farmers	Albert Dunstan	1,604	32.9	+5.4
Nationalist	William Watkins	967	19.8	−8.0
Total formal votes		4,996	95.6	−2.5
Informal votes		224	4.4	+2.5
Turnout		5,097	77.7	+4.9
Two-party-preferred result
Victorian Farmers	Albert Dunstan	2,441	50.1	+50.1
Labor	Tom Tunnecliffe	2,432	49.9	−1.5
Victorian Farmers gain from Labor		Swing	+1.5	

=== East Melbourne ===
1920 Victorian state election: East Melbourne
Party	Candidate	Votes	%	±%
Labor	Michael Collins	2,506	40.6	+10.5
Nationalist	Alfred Farthing	1,940	31.5	−3.0
Nationalist	George Kemp	1,722	27.9	+3.2
Total formal votes		6,168	92.9	−3.5
Informal votes		474	7.1	+3.5
Turnout		6,642	55.2	+7.9
Two-party-preferred result
Nationalist	Alfred Farthing	3,133	50.8	
Labor	Michael Collins	3,035	49.2	
Nationalist hold		Swing	N/A	

=== Essendon ===
1920 Victorian state election: Essendon
Party	Candidate	Votes	%	±%
Nationalist	Thomas Ryan	11,607	57.3	+2.2
Labor	Joseph Murphy	8,661	42.7	−2.2
Total formal votes		20,268	99.0	+1.7
Informal votes		210	1.0	−1.7
Turnout		20,478	65.3	+2.1
Nationalist hold		Swing	+2.2	

=== Evelyn ===
1920 Victorian state election: Evelyn
Party	Candidate	Votes	%	±%
Nationalist	William Everard	3,575	49.1	+6.1
Nationalist	William Williams	1,516	20.8	+20.8
Labor	Arthur Jones	1,098	15.1	+15.1
Nationalist	James Rouget	1,096	15.0	−29.1
Total formal votes		7,285	93.3	−4.2
Informal votes		520	6.7	+4.2
Turnout		7,805	65.3	+19.7
After distribution of preferences
Nationalist	William Everard	3,805	52.2	
Nationalist	William Williams	2,303	31.6	
Labor	Arthur Jones	1,177	16.2	
Nationalist hold		Swing	N/A	

=== Fitzroy ===
1920 Victorian state election: Fitzroy
Party	Candidate	Votes	%	±%
Labor	John Billson	6,162	72.9	
Nationalist	Albert Fraser	2,296	27.1	+27.1
Total formal votes		8,458	97.6	
Informal votes		208	2.4	
Turnout		8,666	58.7	
Labor hold		Swing	N/A	

=== Flemington ===
1920 Victorian state election: Flemington
Party	Candidate	Votes	%	±%
Labor	Edward Wade	unopposed		
Labor hold		Swing		

=== Geelong ===
1920 Victorian state election: Geelong
Party	Candidate	Votes	%	±%
Labor	William Brownbill	5,839	56.6	+7.4
Nationalist	Robert Purnell	4,471	43.4	−7.4
Total formal votes		10,310	95.3	−2.3
Informal votes		513	4.7	+2.3
Turnout		10,823	74.5	+5.6
Labor gain from Nationalist		Swing	+7.4	

=== Gippsland East ===
1920 Victorian state election: Gippsland East
Party	Candidate	Votes	%	±%
Victorian Farmers	Albert Lind	1,624	43.3	+43.3
Nationalist	James Cameron	1,352	36.1	−31.3
Labor	Thomas Rickards	772	20.6	−12.0
Total formal votes		3,748	93.9	−3.5
Informal votes		242	6.1	+3.5
Turnout		3,990	65.0	+6.0
Two-candidate-preferred result
Victorian Farmers	Albert Lind	2,272	60.6	N/A
Nationalist	James Cameron	1,476	39.4	N/A
Victorian Farmers gain from Nationalist		Swing	N/A	

=== Gippsland North ===
1920 Victorian state election: Gippsland North
Party	Candidate	Votes	%	±%
Independent	James McLachlan	4,436	73.7	
Independent	Anthony Brennan	1,583	26.3	+26.3
Total formal votes		6,019	94.0	
Informal votes		382	6.0	
Turnout		6,401	70.0	
Independent hold		Swing	N/A	

=== Gippsland South ===
1920 Victorian state election: Gippsland South
Party	Candidate	Votes	%	±%
Nationalist	Thomas Livingston	3,212	57.8	+3.3
Victorian Farmers	Thomas McGalliard	2,346	42.2	+22.5
Total formal votes		5,558	96.6	−0.5
Informal votes		198	3.4	+0.5
Turnout		5,756	59.4	+11.8
Nationalist hold		Swing	N/A	

=== Gippsland West ===
1920 Victorian state election: Gippsland West
Party	Candidate	Votes	%	±%
Nationalist	John Mackey	unopposed		
Nationalist hold		Swing		

=== Glenelg ===
1920 Victorian state election: Glenelg
Party	Candidate	Votes	%	±%
Labor	William Thomas	2,892	44.1	+2.9
Nationalist	Hugh Campbell	2,121	32.4	−9.6
Victorian Farmers	William Williamson	1,538	23.5	+3.8
Total formal votes		6,551	95.9	−1.7
Informal votes		277	4.1	+1.7
Turnout		6,828	75.6	+9.5
Two-party-preferred result
Labor	William Thomas	3,301	50.4	+1.1
Nationalist	Hugh Campbell	3,250	49.6	−1.1
Labor gain from Nationalist		Swing	+1.1	

=== Goulburn Valley ===
1920 Victorian state election: Goulburn Valley
Party	Candidate	Votes	%	±%
Victorian Farmers	Murray Bourchier	2,878	50.5	+50.5
Nationalist	John Mitchell	2,818	49.5	−18.3
Total formal votes		5,696	94.8	−0.4
Informal votes		313	5.2	+0.4
Turnout		6,009	69.3	+26.0
Victorian Farmers gain from Nationalist		Swing	N/A	

=== Grenville ===
1920 Victorian state election: Grenville
Party	Candidate	Votes	%	±%
Victorian Farmers	David Gibson	2,048	53.3	+25.2
Labor	James Scullin	1,792	46.7	+4.3
Total formal votes		3,627	95.7	−2.4
Informal votes		174	4.3	+2.4
Turnout		4,014	81.4	+13.6
Victorian Farmers hold		Swing	+0.6	

=== Gunbower ===
1920 Victorian state election: Gunbower
Party	Candidate	Votes	%	±%
Nationalist	Henry Angus	3,708	58.5	
Victorian Farmers	William McCann	2,625	41.5	+41.5
Total formal votes		6,333	96.5	
Informal votes		231	3.5	
Turnout		6,564	73.1	
Nationalist hold		Swing	N/A	

=== Hampden ===
1920 Victorian state election: Hampden
Party	Candidate	Votes	%	±%
Nationalist	David Oman	3,992	60.9	−2.1
Victorian Farmers	George Hucker	2,561	39.1	+39.1
Total formal votes		6,553	94.4	−0.9
Informal votes		390	5.6	+0.9
Turnout		6,943	61.1	+5.1
Nationalist hold		Swing	N/A	

=== Hawthorn ===
1920 Victorian state election: Hawthorn
Party	Candidate	Votes	%	±%
Nationalist	William McPherson	8,312	49.9	
Ind. Nationalist	Charles Smith	4,365	26.2	+26.2
Ind. Nationalist	Cecil Brack	3,996	24.0	+24.0
Total formal votes		16,673	91.3	
Informal votes		1,583	8.7	
Turnout		18,256	63.1	
Two-candidate-preferred result
Nationalist	William McPherson	10,284	61.7	
Ind. Nationalist	Charles Smith	6,389	38.3	
Nationalist hold		Swing	N/A	

=== Jika Jika ===
1920 Victorian state election: Jika Jika
Party	Candidate	Votes	%	±%
Labor	John Cain	12,993	59.5	+12.2
Nationalist	Arthur May	8,851	40.5	+10.5
Total formal votes		21,844	99.1	+1.9
Informal votes		191	0.9	−1.9
Turnout		22,035	63.8	+8.7
Labor hold		Swing	+8.9	

=== Kara Kara ===
1920 Victorian state election: Kara Kara
Party	Candidate	Votes	%	±%
Nationalist	John Pennington	2,679	54.5	+4.3
Victorian Farmers	John Hall	2,236	45.5	−4.3
Total formal votes		4,915	98.5	+3.4
Informal votes		73	1.5	−3.4
Turnout		4,988	78.6	+9.4
Nationalist hold		Swing	+4.3	

=== Korong ===
1920 Victorian state election: Korong
Party	Candidate	Votes	%	±%
Victorian Farmers	Isaac Weaver	3,314	80.7	+25.6
Nationalist	Charles Kelly	794	19.3	−25.6
Total formal votes		4,108	94.3	−2.9
Informal votes		250	5.7	+2.9
Turnout		4,358	63.7	+3.0
Victorian Farmers hold		Swing	+25.6	

=== Lowan ===
1920 Victorian state election: Lowan
Party	Candidate	Votes	%	±%
Victorian Farmers	Marcus Wettenhall	3,246	54.6	+54.6
Nationalist	James Menzies	2,853	45.4	
Total formal votes		6,279	96.9	
Informal votes		201	3.1	
Turnout		6,480	67.7	
Victorian Farmers gain from Nationalist		Swing	N/A	

=== Maryborough ===
1920 Victorian state election: Maryborough
Party	Candidate	Votes	%	±%
Labor	George Frost	2,319	48.6	+7.8
Nationalist	Alfred Outtrim	1,649	34.5	−5.4
Victorian Farmers	Robert Laidlaw	806	16.9	+16.9
Total formal votes		4,774	94.0	−4.0
Informal votes		305	6.0	+4.0
Turnout		5,079	73.6	+6.4
Two-party-preferred result
Labor	George Frost	2,466	51.6	+8.2
Nationalist	Alfred Outtrim	2,308	48.4	−8.2
Labor gain from Nationalist		Swing	+8.2	

=== Melbourne ===
1920 Victorian state election: Melbourne
Party	Candidate	Votes	%	±%
Labor	Alexander Rogers	4,037	80.9	
Nationalist	Alfred Buchanan	951	19.1	+19.1
Total formal votes		4,988	98.4	
Informal votes		79	1.6	
Turnout		5,067	57.2	
Labor hold		Swing	N/A	

=== Mornington ===
1920 Victorian state election: Mornington
Party	Candidate	Votes	%	±%
Victorian Farmers	Alfred Downward	5,062	60.1	
Nationalist	Arthur Leadbeater	3,356	39.9	
Total formal votes		8,418	94.2	−2.6
Informal votes		517	5.8	+2.6
Turnout		8,935	56.6	+14.3
Victorian Farmers gain from Nationalist		Swing	N/A	

- Alfred Downward was the sitting Nationalist MP for Mornington, but changed to the Victorian Farmers Union before this election.

=== North Melbourne ===
1920 Victorian state election: North Melbourne
Party	Candidate	Votes	%	±%
Labor	George Prendergast	7,359	67.8	+1.4
Nationalist	Henry Raphael	3,496	32.2	−1.4
Total formal votes		10,855	98.6	+2.4
Informal votes		152	1.4	−2.4
Turnout		11,007	62.7	+10.1
Labor hold		Swing	+1.4	

=== Ovens ===
1920 Victorian state election: Ovens
Party	Candidate	Votes	%	±%
Nationalist	Alfred Billson	unopposed		
Nationalist hold		Swing		

=== Polwarth ===
1920 Victorian state election: Polwarth
Party	Candidate	Votes	%	±%
Nationalist	James McDonald	3,259	43.1	−22.3
Labor	John Linahan	2,729	36.0	+1.4
Victorian Farmers	John Black	1,583	20.9	+20.9
Total formal votes		7,571	95.7	−1.9
Informal votes		342	4.3	+1.9
Turnout		7,913	72.1	+9.1
Two-party-preferred result
Nationalist	James McDonald	4,313	57.0	−1.9
Labor	John Linahan	3,258	43.0	+1.9
Nationalist hold		Swing	−1.9	

=== Port Fairy ===
1920 Victorian state election: Port Fairy
Party	Candidate	Votes	%	±%
Labor	Henry Bailey	unopposed		
Labor hold		Swing		

=== Port Melbourne ===
1920 Victorian state election: Port Melbourne
Party	Candidate	Votes	%	±%
Labor	James Murphy	7,062	67.9	+13.6
Independent	Owen Sinclair	3,337	32.1	+10.0
Total formal votes		10,399	98.6	+1.7
Informal votes		151	1.4	−1.7
Turnout		10,550	65.8	+5.0
Labor hold		Swing	N/A	

=== Prahran ===
1920 Victorian state election: Prahran
Party	Candidate	Votes	%	±%
Labor	Alexander Parker	6,408	51.5	+10.6
Nationalist	Donald Mackinnon	6,048	48.5	−10.6
Total formal votes		12,456	99.1	+2.0
Informal votes		118	0.9	−2.0
Turnout		12,574	60.8	+15.4
Labor gain from Nationalist		Swing	+10.6	

=== Richmond ===
1920 Victorian state election: Richmond
Party	Candidate	Votes	%	±%
Labor	Ted Cotter	unopposed		
Labor hold		Swing		

=== Rodney ===
1920 Victorian state election: Rodney
Party	Candidate	Votes	%	±%
Victorian Farmers	John Allan	4,760	68.4	+30.2
Nationalist	William Thwaites	2,198	31.6	−8.4
Total formal votes		6,958	95.3	−2.4
Informal votes		345	4.7	+2.4
Turnout		7,303	64.5	−4.4
Victorian Farmers hold		Swing	+10.8	

=== St Kilda ===
1920 Victorian state election: St Kilda
Party	Candidate	Votes	%	±%
Nationalist	Frederic Eggleston	4,472	25.7	
Labor	Walter Gorman	3,782	21.7	−2.5
Nationalist	Alban Morley	3,317	19.0	
Nationalist	Henry Barnet	2,859	16.4	
Nationalist	Albert Sculthorpe	1,621	9.3	
Nationalist	Anthony O'Dwyer	1,371	7.9	
Total formal votes		17,422	93.1	−3.6
Informal votes		1,300	6.9	+3.6
Turnout		18,722	54.9	+6.7
Two-candidate-preferred result
Nationalist	Frederic Eggleston	11,065	63.5	
Nationalist	Alban Morley	6,357	36.5	
Nationalist hold		Swing	N/A	

=== Stawell and Ararat ===
1920 Victorian state election: Stawell and Ararat
Party	Candidate	Votes	%	±%
Nationalist	Richard Toutcher	3,135	61.4	+3.3
Labor	Francis Brophy	1,968	38.6	−3.3
Total formal votes		5,103	94.1	−2.8
Informal votes		323	5.9	+2.8
Turnout		5,426	67.5	+8.1
Nationalist hold		Swing	+3.3	

=== Swan Hill ===
1920 Victorian state election: Swan Hill
Party	Candidate	Votes	%	±%
Victorian Farmers	Francis Old	6,386	76.0	+25.1
Nationalist	Frank Hughes	2,015	24.0	+0.7
Total formal votes		8,401	93.8	−2.5
Informal votes		559	6.2	+2.5
Turnout		8,960	50.9	−5.8
Victorian Farmers hold		Swing	N/A	

=== Toorak ===
1920 Victorian state election: Toorak
Party	Candidate	Votes	%	±%
Nationalist	Stanley Argyle	5,528	41.3	+41.3
Labor	Victor Stout	2,968	22.1	+22.1
Nationalist	James Barrett	2,519	18.8	+18.8
Nationalist	Alfred Darroch	2,381	17.8	−17.9
Total formal votes		13,396	93.1	−2.1
Informal votes		988	6.9	+2.1
Turnout		14,384	58.2	+18.6
Two-candidate-preferred result
Nationalist	Stanley Argyle	8,182	61.1	
Nationalist	James Barrett	5,214	38.9	
Nationalist hold		Swing	N/A	

=== Upper Goulburn ===
1920 Victorian state election: Upper Goulburn
Party	Candidate	Votes	%	±%
Labor	Christopher Gleeson	1,746	35.5	+35.5
Victorian Farmers	Edwin Mackrell	1,669	34.0	+34.0
Nationalist	William Whiting	1,499	30.5	
Total formal votes		4,914	94.9	−3.1
Informal votes		267	5.1	+3.1
Turnout		5,181	63.4	+10.0
Two-party-preferred result
Victorian Farmers	Edwin Mackrell	2,857	58.1	+58.1
Labor	Christopher Gleeson	2,057	41.9	+41.9
Victorian Farmers gain from Nationalist		Swing	N/A	

=== Walhalla ===
1920 Victorian state election: Walhalla
Party	Candidate	Votes	%	±%
Nationalist	Samuel Barnes	2,212	66.2	−1.3
Labor	Richard Bowers	1,129	33.8	+1.3
Total formal votes		3,341	95.8	−1.8
Informal votes		148	4.2	+1.8
Turnout		3,489	54.4	+11.9
Nationalist hold		Swing	−1.3	

=== Wangaratta ===
1920 Victorian state election: Wangaratta
Party	Candidate	Votes	%	±%
Victorian Farmers	John Bowser	unopposed		
Victorian Farmers gain from Nationalist		Swing	N/A	

- John Bowser was the sitting Nationalist MP for Wangaratta, but changed to the Victorian Farmers Union before this election.

=== Waranga ===
1920 Victorian state election: Waranga
Party	Candidate	Votes	%	±%
Nationalist	John Gordon	3,102	66.6	+0.9
Labor	Thomas McKendrick	1,554	33.4	−0.9
Total formal votes		4,656	93.5	−2.4
Informal votes		324	6.5	+2.4
Turnout		4,980	70.5	+7.4
Nationalist hold		Swing	+0.9	

=== Warrenheip ===
1920 Victorian state election: Warrenheip
Party	Candidate	Votes	%	±%
Labor	Edmond Hogan	unopposed		
Labor hold		Swing		

=== Warrnambool ===
1920 Victorian state election: Warrnambool
Party	Candidate	Votes	%	±%
Nationalist	James Deany	2,661	41.6	−21.4
Labor	George Heather	2,415	37.8	+0.8
Victorian Farmers	John Clark	1,318	20.6	+20.6
Total formal votes		6,394	94.6	−3.1
Informal votes		364	5.4	+3.1
Turnout		6,758	72.3	+9.9
Two-party-preferred result
Nationalist	James Deany	3,575	55.9	−7.1
Labor	George Heather	2,819	44.1	+7.1
Nationalist hold		Swing	−7.1	

=== Williamstown ===
1920 Victorian state election: Williamstown
Party	Candidate	Votes	%	±%
Labor	John Lemmon	unopposed		
Labor hold		Swing		

== See also ==
- 1920 Victorian state election
- Candidates of the 1920 Victorian state election
- Members of the Victorian Legislative Assembly, 1920–1921
