= Candidates of the 1921 Victorian state election =

The 1921 Victorian state election was held on 30 August 1921.

== Retiring Members ==
No members retired at this election.

== Legislative Assembly ==
Sitting members are shown in bold text. Successful candidates are highlighted in the relevant colour. Where there is possible confusion, an asterisk (*) is also used.

Electorate	Held by	Labor candidates	Nationalist candidates	VFU candidates	Other candidates
Abbotsford	Labor	**Gordon Webber**			
Albert Park	Labor	**Arthur Wallace**	William Hug		
Allandale	Nationalist	Robert Miller	**Sir Alexander Peacock**		
Ballarat East	Nationalist	John Kean	**Robert McGregor**		
Ballarat West	Nationalist	Thomas Wilson	**Matthew Baird**		
Barwon	Nationalist	Herbert Wookey	**Edward Morley**	James Farrer	Duncan McLennan (Ind Nat)
Benalla	VFU		Alfred Manning	**John Carlisle**	
Benambra	Nationalist		**Henry Beardmore**		
Bendigo East	Labor	**Luke Clough**	Tom Brennan		
Bendigo West	Nationalist	Thomas Jude	**David Smith**		
Boroondara	Nationalist		**Edmund Greenwood**		
Borung	VFU		William Hutchinson	**David Allison**	
Brighton	Nationalist		**Oswald Snowball**		
Brunswick	Labor	**James Jewell**	John March		
Bulla	Nationalist		**Andrew Robertson**		
Carlton	Labor	**Robert Solly**			
Castlemaine and Maldon	Nationalist	Percy Clarey	**Harry Lawson**		
Collingwood	Independent Labor	Tom Tunnecliffe	Alexander Young		**Martin Hannah** (Ind Lab); James Reid (Ind)
Dalhousie	Nationalist		**Allan Cameron**		
Dandenong	Nationalist	Roy Beardsworth	**Frank Groves**		
Daylesford	Nationalist	James McDonald	**Donald McLeod**		
Dundas	Labor	**Bill Slater**	Sidney Officer		
Eaglehawk	VFU	Thomas Gamboni	Edward Heitmann	**Albert Dunstan**	William Dunstan (Ind); William Wallace (Ind)
East Melbourne	Nationalist	Michael Collins	**Alfred Farthing**		
Essendon	Nationalist	Alexander Taylor	**Thomas Ryan**		
Evelyn	Nationalist	Arthur Jones	**William Everard**		
Fitzroy	Labor	**John Billson**	Albert Kemp		
Flemington	Labor	**Edward Warde**	Francis Clarey		
Geelong	Labor	**William Brownbill**	William Thwaites		
Gippsland East	VFU		John Jeffers	**Albert Lind**	
Gippsland North	Nationalist	James Bermingham			**James McLachlan** (Ind Lab)
Gippsland South	Nationalist		**Thomas Livingston**	David White	
Gippsland West	Nationalist		**Sir John Mackey**		
Glenelg	Labor	**William Thomas**	Hugh Campbell		
Goulburn Valley	VFU		John Mitchell	**Murray Bourchier**	
Grenville	VFU	Arthur Hughes	George Turner	**David Gibson**	
Gunbower	Nationalist		**Henry Angus**	Ogilvie Watson	
Hampden	Nationalist	Hugh Meagher	**David Oman**	Martin Brennan	
Hawthorn	Nationalist		**William McPherson**		
Jika Jika	Labor	**John Cain**	Joseph Eller		
Kara Kara	Nationalist	Alfred Pearce	**John Pennington**	Alexander Cameron	
Korong	VFU		Peter Hansen	**Isaac Weaver**	
Lowan	VFU		James Menzies	**Marcus Wettenhall**	
Maryborough	Labor	**George Frost**	James Holland		
Melbourne	Labor	**Alexander Rogers**			
Mornington	VFU		William Cook	**Alfred Downward**	Albert Sambell (Ind Nat)
North Melbourne	Labor	**George Prendergast**			
Ovens	Nationalist		**Alfred Billson**		
Polwarth	Nationalist	John Linahan	**James McDonald**		
Port Fairy	Labor	**Henry Bailey**	William Downing		
Port Melbourne	Labor	**James Murphy**			
Prahran	Labor	**Alexander Parker**	Richard Fetherston		
Richmond	Labor	**Ted Cotter**			
Rodney	VFU		Hugh McKenzie	**John Allan**	
St Kilda	Nationalist	Walter Gorman	**Frederic Eggleston**		
Stawell and Ararat	Nationalist	Francis Brophy	**Richard Toutcher**		
Swan Hill	VFU		Royden Patterson	**Francis Old**	
Toorak	Nationalist		**Stanley Argyle**		
Upper Goulburn	VFU	Christopher Gleeson	John Leckie	**Edwin Mackrell**	
Walhalla	Nationalist		**Samuel Barnes**		
Wangaratta	VFU			**John Bowser**	
Waranga	Nationalist		**John Gordon**		
Warrenheip	Labor	**Edmond Hogan**	James Ryan		
Warrnambool	Nationalist	Fred Katz	**James Deany**		
Williamstown	Labor	**John Lemmon**			

== See also ==
- 1922 Victorian Legislative Council election
