= Results of the 1917 Victorian state election (Legislative Assembly) =

Australian state election results

1917 Victorian state election Legislative Assembly << 1914–1920 >>
Enrolled voters	658,488				
Votes cast	356,999		Turnout	54.21	+0.29
Informal votes	11,245		Informal	3.15	+0.88
Summary of votes by party
Party	Primary votes	%	Swing	Seats	Change
Nationalist	197,036	56.99	+0.10	40	– 3
Labor	111,637	32.29	–7.29	18	– 4
Victorian Farmers	21,183	6.13	*	4	+ 4
National Labor	7,747	2.24	*	3	+ 3
Independent	8,161	2.36	*	0	± 0
Total	345,754			65	

This is a list of electoral district results for the 1917 Victorian state election.

While the Nationalist party was split into the Ministerialist Peacock and Economy Bowser factions, statistical records show the Nationalist vote combined. The affiliation of each Nationalist candidate is present on the Candidates page.

Election was conducted in 65 single-member districts using First past the post where only two candidates were in the running and instant-runoff voting where more than two candidates were in the running.

== Results by electoral district ==
=== Abbotsford ===
1917 Victorian state election: Abbotsford
Party	Candidate	Votes	%	±%
Labor	Gordon Webber	unopposed		
Labor hold		Swing		

=== Albert Park ===
1917 Victorian state election: Albert Park
Party	Candidate	Votes	%	±%
Labor	George Elmslie	6,039	57.3	
Nationalist	John Baragwanath	4,499	42.7	
Total formal votes		10,538	96.2	
Informal votes		412	3.8	
Turnout		10,950	59.2	
Labor hold		Swing	N/A	

=== Allandale ===
1917 Victorian state election: Allandale
Party	Candidate	Votes	%	±%
Nationalist	Alexander Peacock	2,444	74.0	
Nationalist	Walter Grose	859	26.0	
Total formal votes		3,303	97.6	
Informal votes		83	2.4	
Turnout		3,386	59.2	
Nationalist hold		Swing	N/A	

=== Ballarat East ===
1917 Victorian state election: Ballarat East
Party	Candidate	Votes	%	±%
Nationalist	Robert McGregor	3,788	55.3	+1.7
Labor	Andrew McKissock	3,064	44.7	−1.7
Total formal votes		6,852	97.0	−1.5
Informal votes		211	3.0	+1.5
Turnout		7,063	70.6	+0.4
Nationalist hold		Swing	+1.7	

=== Ballarat West ===
1917 Victorian state election: Ballarat West
Party	Candidate	Votes	%	±%
Nationalist	Matthew Baird	unopposed		
Nationalist hold		Swing		

=== Barwon ===
1917 Victorian state election: Barwon
Party	Candidate	Votes	%	±%
Nationalist	Duncan McLennan	2,169	39.1	+39.1
Victorian Farmers	Lemuel Griffiths	1,799	32.4	+32.4
Nationalist	James Farrer	1,576	28.4	−31.0
Total formal votes		4,344	96.2	−0.8
Informal votes		219	3.8	+0.8
Turnout		5,763	49.3	−7.5
Two-candidate-preferred result
Nationalist	Duncan McLennan	2,777	50.1	
Victorian Farmers	Lemuel Griffiths	2,767	49.9	
Nationalist hold		Swing	N/A	

=== Benalla ===
1917 Victorian state election: Benalla
Party	Candidate	Votes	%	±%
Nationalist	John Carlisle	2,688	55.1	−11.3
Labor	Laurence Corboy	1,840	37.7	+4.1
Nationalist	Thomas Kennedy	353	7.2	+7.2
Total formal votes		4,881	97.3	−0.7
Informal votes		139	2.7	+0.7
Turnout		5,020	63.3	+10.4
Two-party-preferred result
Nationalist	John Carlisle		61.6	−4.8
Labor	Laurence Corboy		38.4	+4.8
Nationalist hold		Swing	−4.8	

- Two party preferred vote was estimated.

=== Benambra ===
1917 Victorian state election: Benambra
Party	Candidate	Votes	%	±%
Nationalist	Henry Beardmore	1,626	49.0	
Nationalist	Leslie Sambell	1,065	32.1	
Nationalist	George Jephcott	630	19.0	
Total formal votes		3,321	96.6	−1.6
Informal votes		116	3.4	+1.6
Turnout		3,437	51.2	−10.4
Two-candidate-preferred result
Nationalist	Henry Beardmore	2,100	63.2	
Nationalist	Leslie Sambell	1,221	36.8	
Nationalist hold		Swing	N/A	

=== Bendigo East ===
1917 Victorian state election: Bendigo East
Party	Candidate	Votes	%	±%
Labor	Luke Clough	3,112	55.1	−2.7
Nationalist	Walter McRobert	1,640	29.1	
Nationalist	Thomas Currie	892	15.8	
Total formal votes		5,634	97.7	+0.6
Informal votes		132	2.3	−0.6
Turnout		5,766	65.9	+6.8
Two-party-preferred result
Labor	Luke Clough		56.7	−1.1
Nationalist	Walter McRobert		43.3	+1.1
Labor hold		Swing	−1.1	

- Two party preferred vote was estimated.

=== Bendigo West ===
1917 Victorian state election: Bendigo West
Party	Candidate	Votes	%	±%
National Labor	David Smith	3,344	59.8	+26.7
Labor	Arthur Cook	2,244	40.2	+16.9
Total formal votes		5,588	97.2	−0.4
Informal votes		161	2.8	+0.4
Turnout		5,749	60.3	−4.4
National Labor gain from Independent		Swing	N/A	

=== Boroondara ===
1917 Victorian state election: Boroondara
Party	Candidate	Votes	%	±%
Nationalist	Edmund Greenwood	7,461	42.9	
Nationalist	Frank Madden	4,839	27.8	
Nationalist	Frederick Francis	2,654	15.2	
Nationalist	Walter Hiscock	2,450	14.1	
Total formal votes		17,404	96.8	−1.5
Informal votes		573	3.2	+1.5
Turnout		17,977	45.7	+6.8
Two-candidate-preferred result
Nationalist	Edmund Greenwood	11,258	66.7	
Nationalist	Frank Madden	6,146	33.3	
Nationalist hold		Swing	N/A	

=== Borung ===
1917 Victorian state election: Borung
Party	Candidate	Votes	%	±%
Nationalist	William Hutchinson	2,266	51.6	
Victorian Farmers	Edwin Reseigh	2,127	48.4	
Total formal votes		4,393	96.6	
Informal votes		156	3.4	
Turnout		4,549	61.1	
Nationalist hold		Swing	N/A	

=== Brighton ===
1917 Victorian state election: Brighton
Party	Candidate	Votes	%	±%
Nationalist	Oswald Snowball	7,442	73.9	+1.6
Labor	Arthur Roth	1,814	18.0	−9.7
Nationalist	Frederick Leveson	815	8.1	+8.1
Total formal votes		10,071	96.7	−1.4
Informal votes		345	3.3	+1.4
Turnout		10,416	48.0	+6.8
Two-party-preferred result
Nationalist	Oswald Snowball		80.3	+8.0
Labor	Arthur Roth		19.7	−8.0
Nationalist hold		Swing	+8.0	

- Two party preferred vote was estimated.

=== Brunswick ===
1917 Victorian state election: Brunswick
Party	Candidate	Votes	%	±%
Labor	James Jewell	7,575	67.2	+5.1
Nationalist	John March	3,141	27.8	−10.1
Ind. Nationalist	James Davis	563	5.0	+5.0
Total formal votes		11,279	96.8	−0.4
Informal votes		377	3.2	+0.4
Turnout		11,656	49.2	+1.0
Two-party-preferred result
Labor	James Jewell		71.8	+9.7
Nationalist	John March		28.2	−9.7
Labor hold		Swing	+9.7	

- Two party preferred vote was estimated.

=== Bulla ===
1917 Victorian state election: Bulla
Party	Candidate	Votes	%	±%
Nationalist	Andrew Robertson	2,875	54.2	−8.0
Victorian Farmers	James Cunningham	1,847	34.8	+34.8
Nationalist	James Gilchrist	586	11.0	+11.0
Total formal votes		5,308	97.6	−0.2
Informal votes		175	2.4	+0.2
Turnout		5,483	49.6	−6.3
Two-candidate-preferred result
Nationalist	Andrew Robertson		59.7	−2.5
Victorian Farmers	James Cunningham		40.3	+40.3
Nationalist hold		Swing	N/A	

- Two candidate preferred vote was estimated.

=== Carlton ===
1917 Victorian state election: Carlton
Party	Candidate	Votes	%	±%
Labor	Robert Solly	unopposed		
Labor hold		Swing		

=== Castlemaine and Maldon ===
1917 Victorian state election: Castlemaine and Maldon
Party	Candidate	Votes	%	±%
Nationalist	Harry Lawson	unopposed		
Nationalist hold		Swing		

=== Collingwood ===
1917 Victorian state election: Collingwood
Party	Candidate	Votes	%	±%
Labor	Martin Hannah	unopposed		
Labor hold		Swing		

=== Dalhousie ===
1917 Victorian state election: Dalhousie
Party	Candidate	Votes	%	±%
Nationalist	Reginald Argyle	2,232	42.7	−4.4
Nationalist	Allan Cameron	1,888	36.1	−16.8
Labor	Joseph O'Connor	868	16.6	+16.6
Nationalist	Alexander Wilson	244	4.7	+4.7
Total formal votes		5,232	97.5	−0.4
Informal votes		136	2.5	+0.4
Turnout		5,368	74.7	+2.9
Two-candidate-preferred result
Nationalist	Allan Cameron	2,708	51.8	−1.1
Nationalist	Reginald Argyle	2,524	48.2	+1.1
Nationalist hold		Swing	N/A	

=== Dandenong ===
1917 Victorian state election: Dandenong
Party	Candidate	Votes	%	±%
Nationalist	Frank Groves	3,914	58.6	
Nationalist	William Keast	2,764	41.4	
Total formal votes		6,678	97.3	
Informal votes		186	2.7	
Turnout		6,864	43.5	
Nationalist hold		Swing	N/A	

=== Daylesford ===
1917 Victorian state election: Daylesford
Party	Candidate	Votes	%	±%
Nationalist	Donald McLeod	2,530	55.9	−10.2
Labor	Joseph Hannigan	1,998	44.1	+44.1
Total formal votes		4,528	96.9	−1.6
Informal votes		147	3.1	+1.6
Turnout		4,675	69.4	+5.3
Nationalist hold		Swing	N/A	

=== Dundas ===
1917 Victorian state election: Dundas
Party	Candidate	Votes	%	±%
Labor	Bill Slater	2,182	46.8	+2.3
Nationalist	William Smith	1,668	35.8	−4.7
Nationalist	Edward Dobson	813	17.4	+17.4
Total formal votes		4,663	96.4	−1.9
Informal votes		175	3.6	+1.9
Turnout		4,838	57.6	−13.7
Two-party-preferred result
Labor	Bill Slater	2,364	50.7	+1.1
Nationalist	William Smith	2,299	49.3	−1.1
Labor gain from Nationalist		Swing	+1.1	

=== Eaglehawk ===
1917 Victorian state election: Eaglehawk
Party	Candidate	Votes	%	±%
Labor	Tom Tunnecliffe	2,278	44.6	−7.7
Nationalist	Thomas Hicks	1,422	27.8	−19.9
Victorian Farmers	William Hill	1,407	27.5	+27.5
Total formal votes		5,107	98.1	−0.3
Informal votes		101	1.9	+0.3
Turnout		5,208	72.8	+20.7
Two-party-preferred result
Labor	Tom Tunnecliffe	2,625	51.4	−0.9
Nationalist	Thomas Hicks	2,482	48.6	+0.9
Labor hold		Swing	−0.9	

=== East Melbourne ===
1917 Victorian state election: East Melbourne
Party	Candidate	Votes	%	±%
Nationalist	Alfred Farthing	1,854	34.5	+5.9
Labor	Sydney Walker	1,615	30.1	+2.3
Nationalist	George Kemp	1,325	24.7	+24.7
Temperance Movement	John Barrett	577	10.7	+10.7
Total formal votes		5,371	96.4	+0.3
Informal votes		203	3.6	−0.3
Turnout		5,574	47.3	−4.8
Two-candidate-preferred result
Nationalist	Alfred Farthing	3,157	58.8	
Nationalist	George Kemp	2,214	41.2	
Nationalist hold		Swing	N/A	

=== Essendon ===
1917 Victorian state election: Essendon
Party	Candidate	Votes	%	±%
Nationalist	Thomas Ryan	9,551	55.1	+7.5
Labor	Maurice Blackburn	7,782	44.9	−7.5
Total formal votes		17,333	97.3	−1.3
Informal votes		473	2.7	+1.3
Turnout		17,806	63.2	+7.1
Nationalist gain from Labor		Swing	+7.5	

=== Evelyn ===
1917 Victorian state election: Evelyn
Party	Candidate	Votes	%	±%
Nationalist	James Rouget	2,102	44.1	+14.8
Nationalist	William Everard	2,047	43.0	+27.8
Nationalist	Reginald Kelly	616	12.9	+12.9
Total formal votes		4,765	97.5	+1.3
Informal votes		122	2.5	−1.3
Turnout		4,887	45.6	−7.1
Two-candidate-preferred result
Nationalist	William Everard	2,398	50.3	
Nationalist	James Rouget	2,367	49.7	
Nationalist hold		Swing	N/A	

=== Fitzroy ===
1917 Victorian state election: Fitzroy
Party	Candidate	Votes	%	±%
Labor	John Billson	unopposed		
Labor hold		Swing		

=== Flemington ===
1917 Victorian state election: Flemington
Party	Candidate	Votes	%	±%
Labor	Edward Warde	7,062	69.7	
Nationalist	Thomas Ivory	3,072	30.3	
Total formal votes		10,134	95.7	
Informal votes		455	4.3	
Turnout		10,589	47.8	
Labor hold		Swing	N/A	

=== Geelong ===
1917 Victorian state election: Geelong
Party	Candidate	Votes	%	±%
Nationalist	Robert Purnell	4,868	50.8	
Labor	William Brownbill	4,717	49.2	
Total formal votes		9,585	97.6	
Informal votes		234	2.4	
Turnout		9,819	68.9	
Nationalist gain from Labor		Swing	N/A	

=== Gippsland East ===
1917 Victorian state election: Gippsland East
Party	Candidate	Votes	%	±%
Nationalist	James Cameron	1,925	52.5	+6.5
Labor	Gordon Holmes	1,194	32.6	−12.6
Nationalist	James Bayliss	548	14.9	+14.9
Total formal votes		3,667	97.4	−0.3
Informal votes		98	2.6	+0.3
Turnout		3,765	59.0	−0.3
Two-party-preferred result
Nationalist	James Cameron		65.9	+13.4
Labor	Gordon Holmes		34.1	−13.4
Nationalist hold		Swing	+13.4	

- Two party preferred vote was estimated.

=== Gippsland North ===
1917 Victorian state election: Gippsland North
Party	Candidate	Votes	%	±%
National Labor	James McLachlan	unopposed		
National Labor gain from Labor		Swing	N/A	

=== Gippsland South ===
1917 Victorian state election: Gippsland South
Party	Candidate	Votes	%	±%
Nationalist	Thomas Livingston	2,533	54.5	
Nationalist	Thomas McGalliard	1,203	25.9	
Victorian Farmers	James McQueen	915	19.7	
Total formal votes		4,651	97.1	
Informal votes		141	2.9	
Turnout		4,792	47.6	
Nationalist hold		Swing		

- Preferences were not distributed.

=== Gippsland West ===
1917 Victorian state election: Gippsland West
Party	Candidate	Votes	%	±%
Nationalist	John Mackey	unopposed		
Nationalist hold		Swing		

=== Glenelg ===
1917 Victorian state election: Glenelg
Party	Candidate	Votes	%	±%
Nationalist	Hugh Campbell	2,478	42.0	−16.1
Labor	William Thomas	2,433	41.2	−0.7
Victorian Farmers	Walter Watson	989	16.8	+16.8
Total formal votes		5,900	97.6	+0.9
Informal votes		147	2.4	−0.9
Turnout		6,047	66.1	+0.1
Two-party-preferred result
Nationalist	Hugh Campbell	2,992	50.7	−7.4
Labor	William Thomas	2,908	49.3	+7.4
Nationalist hold		Swing	−7.4	

=== Goulburn Valley ===
1917 Victorian state election: Goulburn Valley
Party	Candidate	Votes	%	±%
Nationalist	John Mitchell	2,432	67.8	+30.3
Nationalist	Thomas Lyons	1,555	32.2	+11.7
Total formal votes		3,497	95.2	−3.2
Informal votes		181	4.8	+3.2
Turnout		3,768	43.3	−15.6
Nationalist hold		Swing	N/A	

=== Grenville ===
1917 Victorian state election: Grenville
Party	Candidate	Votes	%	±%
Labor	Frederick Hower	1,538	42.4	−16.3
Victorian Farmers	David Gibson	1,021	28.1	+28.1
Nationalist	Henry Vernon	816	22.5	−18.8
Nationalist	George Meudell	252	7.0	+7.0
Total formal votes		3,627	98.1	+0.2
Informal votes		72	1.9	−0.2
Turnout		3,699	67.8	−1.3
Two-party-preferred result
Victorian Farmers	David Gibson	1,911	52.7	
Labor	Frederick Hower	1,716	47.3	
Victorian Farmers gain from Labor		Swing	N/A	

=== Gunbower ===
1917 Victorian state election: Gunbower
Party	Candidate	Votes	%	±%
Nationalist	Henry Angus	unopposed		
Nationalist hold		Swing		

=== Hampden ===
1917 Victorian state election: Hampden
Party	Candidate	Votes	%	±%
Nationalist	David Oman	3,889	63.0	+2.9
Labor	Patrick McMahon	2,283	37.0	−2.9
Total formal votes		6,172	95.3	−2.2
Informal votes		307	4.7	+2.2
Turnout		6,479	56.0	−3.7
Nationalist hold		Swing	+2.9	

=== Hawthorn ===
1917 Victorian state election: Hawthorn
Party	Candidate	Votes	%	±%
Nationalist	William McPherson	unopposed		
Nationalist hold		Swing		

=== Jika Jika ===
1917 Victorian state election: Jika Jika
Party	Candidate	Votes	%	±%
Labor	John Cain	7,654	47.3	+3.4
Nationalist	Arthur May	4,856	30.0	−26.1
Nationalist	Samuel Dennis	3,283	20.8	+20.8
Independent Labor	George Jewell	403	2.5	+2.5
Total formal votes		16,196	97.2	−1.0
Informal votes		476	2.8	+1.0
Turnout		16,672	55.1	+3.9
Two-party-preferred result
Labor	John Cain	8,119	50.6	+6.7
Nationalist	Arthur May	7,997	49.4	−6.7
Labor gain from Nationalist		Swing	+6.7	

=== Kara Kara ===
1917 Victorian state election: Kara Kara
Party	Candidate	Votes	%	±%
Nationalist	John Pennington	2,245	50.2	−15.2
Victorian Farmers	John Hall	2,230	49.8	+49.8
Total formal votes		4,475	95.1	−3.1
Informal votes		232	4.9	+3.1
Turnout		4,707	69.2	−4.6
Nationalist hold		Swing	N/A	

=== Korong ===
1917 Victorian state election: Korong
Party	Candidate	Votes	%	±%
Victorian Farmers	Isaac Weaver	2,306	55.1	+55.1
Nationalist	Achilles Gray	1,876	44.9	−18.7
Total formal votes		4,182	97.1	0.0
Informal votes		123	2.9	0.0
Turnout		4,305	60.7	+2.0
Victorian Farmers gain from Nationalist		Swing	N/A	

=== Lowan ===
1917 Victorian state election: Lowan
Party	Candidate	Votes	%	±%
Nationalist	James Menzies	unopposed		
Nationalist hold		Swing		

=== Maryborough ===
1917 Victorian state election: Maryborough
Party	Candidate	Votes	%	±%
Labor	Thomas Jude	1,929	40.8	−21.8
National Labor	Alfred Outtrim	1,886	39.9	+39.9
Nationalist	Robert Laidlaw	908	19.2	−18.2
Total formal votes		4,723	98.0	−0.3
Informal votes		99	2.0	+0.3
Turnout		4,822	67.2	+7.0
Two-party-preferred result
National Labor	Alfred Outtrim	2,672	56.6	+56.6
Labor	Thomas Jude	2,051	43.4	−19.2
National Labor gain from Labor		Swing	N/A	

=== Melbourne ===
1917 Victorian state election: Melbourne
Party	Candidate	Votes	%	±%
Labor	Alexander Rogers	unopposed		
Labor hold		Swing		

=== Mornington ===
1917 Victorian state election: Mornington
Party	Candidate	Votes	%	±%
Nationalist	Alfred Downward	3,373	55.5	
Nationalist	Robert Anderson	2,701	44.5	
Total formal votes		6,074	96.8	+0.3
Informal votes		200	3.2	−0.3
Turnout		6,274	42.3	−2.5
Nationalist hold		Swing	N/A	

=== North Melbourne ===
1917 Victorian state election: North Melbourne
Party	Candidate	Votes	%	±%
Labor	George Prendergast	5,731	66.4	−3.1
Nationalist	John Vroland	2,899	33.6	+3.1
Total formal votes		8,630	96.2	−0.6
Informal votes		341	3.8	+0.6
Turnout		8,971	52.6	+7.6
Labor hold		Swing	−3.1	

=== Ovens ===
1917 Victorian state election: Ovens
Party	Candidate	Votes	%	±%
Nationalist	Alfred Billson	1,580	46.7	−5.7
Labor	William Gribble	1,026	30.3	−17.3
Nationalist	Erle Evans	776	22.9	+22.9
Total formal votes		3,382	95.9	−2.0
Informal votes		146	4.1	+2.0
Turnout		3,528	58.9	−7.3
Two-party-preferred result
Nationalist	Alfred Billson	2,022	59.8	+7.4
Labor	William Gribble	1,360	40.2	−7.4
Nationalist hold		Swing	+7.4	

=== Polwarth ===
1917 Victorian state election: Polwarth
Party	Candidate	Votes	%	±%
Nationalist	James McDonald	2,964	44.1	
Labor	Edward Smith	2,327	34.6	−2.4
Nationalist	John Hancock	1,128	16.8	
Nationalist	Edgar Churches	305	4.5	
Total formal votes		6,724	97.6	+0.2
Informal votes		169	2.4	−0.2
Turnout		6,893	63.0	−1.4
Two-party-preferred result
Nationalist	James McDonald	3,963	58.9	−4.1
Labor	Edward Smith	2,761	41.1	+4.1
Nationalist hold		Swing	−4.1	

=== Port Fairy ===
1917 Victorian state election: Port Fairy
Party	Candidate	Votes	%	±%
Labor	Henry Bailey	3,517	67.5	+15.0
Nationalist	Alfred Noar	1,691	32.5	−15.0
Total formal votes		5,208	98.6	+0.9
Informal votes		75	1.4	−0.9
Turnout		5,283	67.7	−3.5
Labor hold		Swing	+15.0	

=== Port Melbourne ===
1917 Victorian state election: Port Melbourne
Party	Candidate	Votes	%	±%
Labor	James Murphy	5,242	54.3	
Nationalist	James Crichton	2,202	22.8	
Independent Labor	Owen Sinclair	2,134	22.1	
Independent Labor	Henry Sanderson	74	0.8	
Total formal votes		9,652	96.9	
Informal votes		306	3.1	
Turnout		9,958	60.8	
Two-party-preferred result
Labor	James Murphy		71.5	
Nationalist	James Crichton		28.5	
Labor hold		Swing	N/A	

- Two party preferred vote was estimated.

=== Prahran ===
1917 Victorian state election: Prahran
Party	Candidate	Votes	%	±%
Nationalist	Donald Mackinnon	5,291	59.1	+6.7
Labor	Harry Smith	3,659	40.9	−6.7
Total formal votes		8,950	97.1	−0.6
Informal votes		265	2.9	+0.6
Turnout		9,215	45.4	−1.9
Nationalist hold		Swing	+6.7	

=== Richmond ===
1917 Victorian state election: Richmond
Party	Candidate	Votes	%	±%
Labor	Ted Cotter	unopposed		
Labor hold		Swing		

=== Rodney ===
1917 Victorian state election: Rodney
Party	Candidate	Votes	%	±%
Nationalist	Hugh McKenzie	2,786	40.0	−10.3
Victorian Farmers	John Allan	2,665	38.2	+38.2
Temperance Movement	William Day	1,520	21.8	+21.8
Total formal votes		6,971	97.7	0.0
Informal votes		166	2.3	0.0
Turnout		7,137	68.9	+0.6
Two-candidate-preferred result
Victorian Farmers	John Allan	4,016	57.6	+57.6
Nationalist	Hugh McKenzie	2,955	42.4	−13.3
Victorian Farmers gain from Nationalist		Swing	N/A	

=== St Kilda ===
1917 Victorian state election: St Kilda
Party	Candidate	Votes	%	±%
Nationalist	Agar Wynne	5,309	38.0	
Nationalist	John Macfarlan	5,279	37.8	
Labor	George McGowan	3,374	24.2	−11.3
Total formal votes		13,962	96.7	−1.7
Informal votes		470	3.3	+1.7
Turnout		14,432	48.2	+11.0
Two-candidate-preferred result
Nationalist	Agar Wynne	7,126	51.0	
Nationalist	John Macfarlan	6,836	49.0	
Nationalist hold		Swing	N/A	

=== Stawell and Ararat ===
1917 Victorian state election: Stawell and Ararat
Party	Candidate	Votes	%	±%
Nationalist	Richard Toutcher	3,029	58.1	+2.7
Labor	William Tibbles	2,182	41.9	−2.7
Total formal votes		5,211	96.9	−1.2
Informal votes		165	3.1	+1.2
Turnout		5,376	59.4	−3.6
Nationalist hold		Swing	+2.7	

=== Swan Hill ===
1917 Victorian state election: Swan Hill
Party	Candidate	Votes	%	±%
Victorian Farmers	Percy Stewart	3,877	50.9	
Independent	Hugh McClelland	1,972	25.9	
Nationalist	John Gray	1,774	23.3	
Total formal votes		7,623	96.3	−0.6
Informal votes		290	3.7	+0.6
Turnout		7,913	56.7	+11.2
Victorian Farmers gain from Nationalist		Swing	N/A	

- Two candidate preferred vote was not counted.

=== Toorak ===
1917 Victorian state election: Toorak
Party	Candidate	Votes	%	±%
Nationalist	Norman Bayles	5,756	64.3	−12.5
Nationalist	Alfred Darroch	3,190	35.7	+35.7
Total formal votes		8,946	95.2	−2.8
Informal votes		453	4.8	+2.8
Turnout		9,399	39.6	−2.6
Nationalist hold		Swing	N/A	

=== Upper Goulburn ===
1917 Victorian state election: Upper Goulburn
Party	Candidate	Votes	%	±%
Nationalist	Malcolm McKenzie	2,630	61.0	+1.0
Nationalist	Thomas Hunt	1,678	39.0	+39.0
Total formal votes		4,308	98.0	+1.3
Informal votes		87	2.0	−1.3
Turnout		4,395	53.4	−4.1
Nationalist hold		Swing	N/A	

=== Walhalla ===
1917 Victorian state election: Walhalla
Party	Candidate	Votes	%	±%
Nationalist	Samuel Barnes	1,776	67.5	+3.6
Labor	Edward Nichols	856	32.5	−3.6
Total formal votes		2,632	97.6	−0.4
Informal votes		65	2.4	+0.4
Turnout		2,697	42.5	−1.0
Nationalist hold		Swing	+3.6	

=== Wangaratta ===
1917 Victorian state election: Wangaratta
Party	Candidate	Votes	%	±%
Nationalist	John Bowser	unopposed		
Nationalist hold		Swing		

=== Waranga ===
1917 Victorian state election: Waranga
Party	Candidate	Votes	%	±%
Nationalist	John Gordon	2,811	65.7	−8.0
Labor	Leon Villiers	1,465	34.3	+8.0
Total formal votes		4,276	95.9	−2.1
Informal votes		183	4.1	+2.1
Turnout		4,459	63.1	−4.5
Nationalist hold		Swing	−8.0	

=== Warrenheip ===
1917 Victorian state election: Warrenheip
Party	Candidate	Votes	%	±%
Labor	Edmond Hogan	2,426	62.4	+9.4
Nationalist	Garnett Durham	1,460	37.6	−9.4
Total formal votes		3,886	98.1	+0.6
Informal votes		76	1.9	−0.6
Turnout		3,962	62.4	−10.2
Labor hold		Swing	+9.4	

=== Warrnambool ===
1917 Victorian state election: Warrnambool
Party	Candidate	Votes	%	±%
Nationalist	James Deany	3,489	63.0	+0.1
Labor	James McMeel	2,046	37.0	−0.1
Total formal votes		5,535	97.7	+0.5
Informal votes		128	2.3	−0.5
Turnout		5,663	62.4	+8.1
Nationalist hold		Swing	+0.1	

=== Williamstown ===
1917 Victorian state election: Williamstown
Party	Candidate	Votes	%	±%
Labor	John Lemmon	6,565	72.3	
Nationalist	George Greenslade	2,517	27.7	
Total formal votes		9,082	95.3	
Informal votes		453	4.7	
Turnout		9,535	43.0	
Labor hold		Swing	N/A	

== See also ==
- 1917 Victorian state election
- Candidates of the 1917 Victorian state election
- Members of the Victorian Legislative Assembly, 1917–1920
