= Candidates of the 1920 Victorian state election =

The 1920 Victorian state election was held on 21 October 1920.

== Retiring Members ==
=== Nationalist ===
- Norman Bayles MLA (Toorak)
- Malcolm McKenzie MLA (Upper Goulburn)
- Agar Wynne MLA (St Kilda)

== Legislative Assembly ==
Sitting members are shown in bold text. Successful candidates are highlighted in the relevant colour. Where there is possible confusion, an asterisk (*) is also used.

Electorate	Held by	Labor candidates	Nationalist candidates	VFU candidates	Other candidates
Abbotsford	Labor	**Gordon Webber**			
Albert Park	Labor	**Arthur Wallace**			James Morris (Ind)
Allandale	Nationalist		**Sir Alexander Peacock**		
Ballarat East	Nationalist	Walter Dalton	**Robert McGregor**		
Ballarat West	Nationalist		**Matthew Baird**		Charles Brind (Ind Nat)
Barwon	Nationalist		**Duncan McLennan**	Herbert Lumb	Edward Morley (Ind Nat)
Benalla	Nationalist		Robert Lewers	**John Carlisle**	
Benambra	Nationalist		**Henry Beardmore**		Edward Clutterbuck (Ind Nat)
Bendigo East	Labor	**Luke Clough**	Edwin Ham		
Bendigo West	Nationalist	Thomas Jude	**David Smith**		David Andrew (Ind)
Boroondara	Nationalist	William Wilcock	**Edmund Greenwood***; George Palmer		
Borung	Nationalist		**William Hutchinson**	David Allison	
Brighton	Nationalist		**Oswald Snowball**		Robert Stephenson (Ind Nat)
Brunswick	Labor	**James Jewell**	Albert Batley		
Bulla	Nationalist		**Andrew Robertson**	Michael McGuinness	
Carlton	Labor	**Robert Solly**			
Castlemaine and Maldon	Nationalist	Christopher Bennett	**Harry Lawson**		
Collingwood	Labor	Thomas McAllen	Harry Evans		**Martin Hannah** (Ind Lab)
Dalhousie	Nationalist		**Allan Cameron**	Thomas Paterson	Robert Mitchell (Ind Nat)
Dandenong	Nationalist	Roy Beardsworth	**Frank Groves**	Peter Gleeson	
Daylesford	Nationalist		**Donald McLeod**		Henry Taylor (Ind Nat)
Dundas	Labor	**Bill Slater**		William Nankervis	
Eaglehawk	Labor	**Tom Tunnecliffe**	William Watkins	Albert Dunstan	
East Melbourne	Nationalist	Michael Collins	**Alfred Farthing***; George Kemp		
Essendon	Nationalist	Joseph Murphy	**Thomas Ryan**		
Evelyn	Nationalist	Arthur Jones	**William Everard***; James Rouget; William Williams		
Fitzroy	Labor	**John Billson**	Albert Fraser		
Flemington	Labor	**Edward Warde**			
Geelong	Nationalist	William Brownbill	**Robert Purnell**		
Gippsland East	Nationalist	Thomas Rickards	**James Cameron**	Albert Lind	
Gippsland North	Nationalist		**James McLachlan**		Anthony Brennan (Ind)
Gippsland South	Nationalist		**Thomas Livingston**	Thomas McGalliard	
Gippsland West	Nationalist		**John Mackey**		
Glenelg	Nationalist	William Thomas	**Hugh Campbell**	William Williamson	
Goulburn Valley	Nationalist		**John Mitchell**	Murray Bourchier	
Grenville	VFU	James Scullin		**David Gibson**	
Gunbower	Nationalist		**Henry Angus**	William McCann	
Hampden	Nationalist		**David Oman**	George Hucker	
Hawthorn	Nationalist		**William McPherson***; Charles Smith		Cecil Brack (Ind Nat)
Jika Jika	Labor	**John Cain**	Arthur May		
Kara Kara	Nationalist		**John Pennington**	John Hall	
Korong	VFU		Charles Kelly	**Isaac Weaver**	
Lowan	Nationalist		**James Menzies**	Marcus Wettenhall	
Maryborough	Nationalist	George Frost	**Alfred Outtrim**	Robert Laidlaw	
Melbourne	Labor	**Alexander Rogers**	Alfred Buchanan		
Mornington	Nationalist		Arthur Leadbeater	**Alfred Downward**	
North Melbourne	Labor	**George Prendergast**	Henry Raphael		
Ovens	Nationalist		**Alfred Billson**		
Polwarth	Nationalist	John Linahan	**James McDonald**	John Black	
Port Fairy	Labor	**Henry Bailey**			
Port Melbourne	Labor	**James Murphy**			Owen Sinclair (Ind)
Prahran	Nationalist	Alexander Parker	**Donald Mackinnon**		
Richmond	Labor	**Ted Cotter**			
Rodney	VFU		William Thwaites	**John Allan**	
St Kilda	Nationalist	Walter Gorman	Henry Barnet; Frederic Eggleston*; Alban Morley; Anthony O'Dwyer; Albert Sculthorpe		
Stawell and Ararat	Nationalist	Francis Brophy	**Richard Toutcher**		
Swan Hill	VFU		Frank Hughes	**Francis Old**	
Toorak	Nationalist	Victor Stout	Stanley Argyle*; Sir James Barrett; Alfred Darroch		
Upper Goulburn	Nationalist	Christopher Gleeson	William Whiting	Edwin Mackrell	
Walhalla	Nationalist	Richard Bowers	**Samuel Barnes**		
Wangaratta	Nationalist			**John Bowser**	
Waranga	Nationalist	Thomas McKendrick	**John Gordon**		
Warrenheip	Labor	**Edmond Hogan**			
Warrnambool	Nationalist	George Heather	**James Deany**	John Clark	
Williamstown	Labor	**John Lemmon**			

== See also ==
- 1919 Victorian Legislative Council election
