= Electoral results for the district of Barwon (Victoria) =

Victoria, Australia, district election results

This is a list of electoral results for the electoral district of Barwon in Victorian state elections.

== Members for Barwon ==
Member	Party	Term
Jonas Levien	Unaligned	1877
John Ince	Unaligned	1877–1880
Jonas Levien	Unaligned	1880–1906
James Farrer	Liberal	1906–1917
Duncan McLennan	Nationalist	1917–1920
Edward Morley	Independent Nationalist	1920–1921
Edward Morley	Nationalist	1921–1929
Thomas Maltby	Nationalist	1929–1931
Thomas Maltby	UAP	1931–1945
Thomas Maltby	Independent Liberal	1945–1946
Thomas Maltby	Liberal	1946–1949
Thomas Maltby	Liberal and Country	1949–1955

== Election results ==
=== Elections in the 1950s ===
1952 Victorian state election: Barwon
Party	Candidate	Votes	%	±%
Liberal and Country	Thomas Maltby	8,483	51.7	−48.3
Labor	Charles Plummer	7,915	48.3	+48.3
Total formal votes		16,398	99.0	
Informal votes		172	1.0	
Turnout		16,570	93.8	
Liberal and Country hold		Swing	N/A	

1950 Victorian state election: Barwon
Party	Candidate	Votes	%	±%
Liberal and Country	Thomas Maltby	unopposed		
Liberal and Country hold		Swing		

=== Elections in the 1940s ===
1947 Victorian state election: Barwon
Party	Candidate	Votes	%	±%
Liberal	Thomas Maltby	9,449	65.7	+49.2
Labor	Don Ferguson	4,933	34.3	0.0
Total formal votes		14,382	98.9	+0.6
Informal votes		155	1.1	−0.1
Turnout		14,537	94.1	+2.5
Liberal gain from Independent Liberal		Swing	N/A	

1945 Victorian state election: Barwon
Party	Candidate	Votes	%	±%
Labor	Don Ferguson	4,291	34.3	
Ministerial Liberal	Thomas Maltby	3,557	28.4	
Country	James Henderson	2,605	20.8	
Liberal	Robert Shirra	2,068	16.5	
Total formal votes		12,521	98.3	
Informal votes		213	1.7	
Turnout		12,734	89.2	
Two-party-preferred result
Ministerial Liberal	Thomas Maltby	7,511	60.0	
Labor	Don Ferguson	5,010	40.0	
Ministerial Liberal gain from Liberal		Swing		

1943 Victorian state election: Barwon
Party	Candidate	Votes	%	±%
United Australia	Thomas Maltby	7,413	61.2	−38.8
Labor	George Gorrie	4,701	38.8	+38.8
Total formal votes		12,114	99.1	
Informal votes		107	0.9	
Turnout		12,221	88.4	
United Australia hold		Swing	N/A	

1940 Victorian state election: Barwon
Party	Candidate	Votes	%	±%
United Australia	Thomas Maltby	unopposed		
United Australia hold		Swing		

=== Elections in the 1930s ===
1937 Victorian state election: Barwon
Party	Candidate	Votes	%	±%
United Australia	Thomas Maltby	7,259	60.4	+4.3
Country	Warwick Cayley	4,757	39.6	+39.6
Total formal votes		12,016	98.9	+0.3
Informal votes		134	1.1	−0.3
Turnout		12,150	94.8	−0.1
United Australia hold		Swing	N/A	

1935 Victorian state election: Barwon
Party	Candidate	Votes	%	±%
United Australia	Thomas Maltby	6,573	56.1	−43.9
Independent	Thomas Ellis	2,701	23.1	+23.1
Labor	Sydney Gerson	2,438	20.8	+20.8
Total formal votes		11,712	98.6	
Informal votes		165	1.4	
Turnout		11,877	94.9	
United Australia hold		Swing	N/A	

- Preferences were not distributed.

1932 Victorian state election: Barwon
Party	Candidate	Votes	%	±%
United Australia	Thomas Maltby	unopposed		
United Australia hold		Swing		

=== Elections in the 1920s ===
1929 Victorian state election: Barwon
Party	Candidate	Votes	%	±%
Nationalist	Thomas Maltby	6,821	61.6	−2.6
Labor	John Bond	4,246	38.4	+2.6
Total formal votes		11,067	99.3	+0.7
Informal votes		78	0.7	−0.7
Turnout		11,145	96.2	+4.6
Nationalist hold		Swing	−2.6	

1929 Barwon state by-election
Party	Candidate	Votes	%	±%
Nationalist	Thomas Maltby	5,256	50.7	−13.5
Ind. Nationalist	John Black	2,789	26.9	+26.9
Ind. Nationalist	Alan Belcher	2,311	22.3	+22.3
Total formal votes		10,356	98.8	+0.2
Informal votes		131	1.2	−0.2
Turnout		10,487	91.4	−0.2
Nationalist hold		Swing	N/A	

- Preferences were not distributed.

1927 Victorian state election: Barwon
Party	Candidate	Votes	%	±%
Nationalist	Edward Morley	6,637	64.2	
Labor	John Jensen	3,703	35.8	
Total formal votes		10,340	98.6	
Informal votes		146	1.4	
Turnout		10,486	91.6	
Nationalist hold		Swing		

1924 Victorian state election: Barwon
Party	Candidate	Votes	%	±%
Nationalist	Edward Morley	5,086	69.5	+29.5
Labor	Alicia Katz	2,228	30.5	+11.4
Total formal votes		7,314	99.3	+0.8
Informal votes		53	0.7	−0.8
Turnout		7,367	69.6	+4.1
Nationalist hold		Swing	N/A	

1921 Victorian state election: Barwon
Party	Candidate	Votes	%	±%
Nationalist	Edward Morley	3,117	40.0	+4.7
Ind. Nationalist	Duncan McLennan	1,789	23.0	+23.0
Labor	Herbert Wookey	1,484	19.1	+19.1
Victorian Farmers	James Farrer	1,375	17.7	−4.7
Total formal votes		7,765	98.5	+3.7
Informal votes		122	1.5	−3.7
Turnout		7,887	65.5	−3.8
Two-candidate-preferred result
Nationalist	Edward Morley	4,486	63.9	+14.3
Ind. Nationalist	Duncan McLennan	3,279	36.1	−14.3
Nationalist gain from Ind. Nationalist		Swing	+14.3	

- Edward Morley was elected in the 1920 election as an Independent Nationalist, but joined the Nationalists before this election.

1920 Victorian state election: Barwon
Party	Candidate	Votes	%	±%
Ind. Nationalist	Edward Morley	3,281	42.3	+42.3
Nationalist	Duncan McLennan	2,743	35.3	−3.8
Victorian Farmers	Herbert Lumb	1,739	22.4	−10.0
Total formal votes		7,763	94.8	−1.4
Informal votes		424	5.2	+1.4
Turnout		8,187	69.3	+20.0
Two-candidate-preferred result
Ind. Nationalist	Edward Morley	3,912	50.4	+50.4
Nationalist	Duncan McLennan	3,851	49.6	−0.5
Ind. Nationalist gain from Nationalist		Swing	N/A	

=== Elections in the 1910s ===
1917 Victorian state election: Barwon
Party	Candidate	Votes	%	±%
Nationalist	Duncan McLennan	2,169	39.1	+39.1
Victorian Farmers	Lemuel Griffiths	1,799	32.4	+32.4
Nationalist	James Farrer	1,576	28.4	−31.0
Total formal votes		4,344	96.2	−0.8
Informal votes		219	3.8	+0.8
Turnout		5,763	49.3	−7.5
Two-candidate-preferred result
Nationalist	Duncan McLennan	2,777	50.1	
Victorian Farmers	Lemuel Griffiths	2,767	49.9	
Nationalist hold		Swing	N/A	

1914 Victorian state election: Barwon
Party	Candidate	Votes	%	±%
Liberal	James Farrer	3,711	59.4	+22.9
Labor	Alexander Parker	2,533	40.6	+2.9
Total formal votes		6,244	97.0	−1.4
Informal votes		194	3.0	+1.4
Turnout		6,438	56.8	−12.7
Liberal hold		Swing	−1.5	

1911 Victorian state election: Barwon
Party	Candidate	Votes	%	±%
Labor	William Brownbill	2,676	37.7	+1.1
Liberal	James Farrer	2,529	36.5	−3.3
Independent Liberal	William Kendell	1,831	25.8	+25.8
Total formal votes		7,099	98.4	−1.0
Informal votes		112	1.6	+1.0
Turnout		7,211	69.5	+18.6
Two-party-preferred result
Liberal	James Farrer	4,326	60.9	N/A
Labor	William Brownbill	2,773	39.1	N/A
Liberal hold		Swing	N/A	
