= Electoral results for the district of Wangaratta =

Australian district election results

This is a list of electoral results for the electoral district of Wangaratta in Victorian state elections.

== Members of Wangaratta ==
John Bowser was member for Wangaratta and Rutherglen until the 1904 election.

Member	Party	Term
Sir John Bowser	Unaligned	1904–1916
Sir John Bowser	Nationalist	1916–1921
Sir John Bowser	Country	1921–1927

== Election results ==
=== Elections in the 1920s ===
1924 Victorian state election: Wangaratta
Party	Candidate	Votes	%	±%
Country	John Bowser	unopposed		
Country hold		Swing		

1921 Victorian state election: Wangaratta
Party	Candidate	Votes	%	±%
Victorian Farmers	John Bowser	unopposed		
Victorian Farmers hold		Swing		

1920 Victorian state election: Wangaratta
Party	Candidate	Votes	%	±%
Victorian Farmers	John Bowser	unopposed		
Victorian Farmers gain from Nationalist		Swing	N/A	

- John Bowser was the sitting Nationalist MP for Wangaratta, but changed to the Victorian Farmers Union before this election.

=== Elections in the 1910s ===
1917 Victorian state election: Wangaratta
Party	Candidate	Votes	%	±%
Nationalist	John Bowser	unopposed		
Nationalist hold		Swing		

1914 Victorian state election: Wangaratta
Party	Candidate	Votes	%	±%
Liberal	John Bowser	3,269	70.8	−29.2
Labor	William Phillips	1,347	29.2	+29.2
Total formal votes		4,616	98.3	
Informal votes		78	1.7	
Turnout		4,694	55.1	
Liberal hold		Swing	N/A	

1911 Victorian state election: Wangaratta
Party	Candidate	Votes	%	±%
Liberal	John Bowser	unopposed		
Liberal hold		Swing		
