= Electoral results for the district of Eaglehawk =

Australian district election results

This is a list of electoral results for the electoral district of Eaglehawk in Victorian state elections.

== Members for Eaglehawk ==
Member	Party	Term
Henry Williams	Unaligned	1889–1902
Hay Kirkwood	Ministerial	1902–1907
Tom Tunnecliffe	Labor	1907–1920
Albert Dunstan	Vic. Farmers/ Country	1920–1927

== Election results ==
=== Elections in the 1920s ===
1924 Victorian state election: Eaglehawk
Party	Candidate	Votes	%	±%
Country	Albert Dunstan	2,747	83.4	+46.1
Nationalist	Albert Hodsworth	546	16.6	−4.7
Total formal votes		3,293	99.5	+1.4
Informal votes		16	0.5	−1.4
Turnout		3,309	56.5	−20.0
Country hold		Swing	N/A	

1921 Victorian state election: Eaglehawk
Party	Candidate	Votes	%	±%
Victorian Farmers	Albert Dunstan	1,795	37.3	+4.4
Labor	Thomas Gamboni	1,484	30.8	−16.4
Nationalist	Edward Heitmann	1,027	21.3	+1.5
Independent	William Wallace	419	8.7	+8.7
Independent	William Dunstan	91	1.9	+1.9
Total formal votes		4,816	98.1	+2.5
Informal votes		92	1.9	−2.5
Turnout		4,908	76.5	−1.2
Two-party-preferred result
Victorian Farmers	Albert Dunstan	3,077	63.9	+13.8
Labor	Thomas Gamboni	1,739	36.1	−13.8
Victorian Farmers hold		Swing	+13.8	

1920 Victorian state election: Eaglehawk
Party	Candidate	Votes	%	±%
Labor	Tom Tunnecliffe	2,302	47.2	+2.6
Victorian Farmers	Albert Dunstan	1,604	32.9	+5.4
Nationalist	William Watkins	967	19.8	−8.0
Total formal votes		4,996	95.6	−2.5
Informal votes		224	4.4	+2.5
Turnout		5,097	77.7	+4.9
Two-party-preferred result
Victorian Farmers	Albert Dunstan	2,441	50.1	+50.1
Labor	Tom Tunnecliffe	2,432	49.9	−1.5
Victorian Farmers gain from Labor		Swing	+1.5	

=== Elections in the 1910s ===
1917 Victorian state election: Eaglehawk
Party	Candidate	Votes	%	±%
Labor	Tom Tunnecliffe	2,278	44.6	−7.7
Nationalist	Thomas Hicks	1,422	27.8	−19.9
Victorian Farmers	William Hill	1,407	27.5	+27.5
Total formal votes		5,107	98.1	−0.3
Informal votes		101	1.9	+0.3
Turnout		5,208	72.8	+20.7
Two-party-preferred result
Labor	Tom Tunnecliffe	2,625	51.4	−0.9
Nationalist	Thomas Hicks	2,482	48.6	+0.9
Labor hold		Swing	−0.9	

1914 Victorian state election: Eaglehawk
Party	Candidate	Votes	%	±%
Labor	Tom Tunnecliffe	2,783	52.3	−0.8
Liberal	William Wallace	2,536	47.7	+0.8
Total formal votes		5,319	98.4	−0.7
Informal votes		87	1.6	+0.7
Turnout		5,406	52.1	−19.2
Labor hold		Swing	−0.8	

1911 Victorian state election: Eaglehawk
Party	Candidate	Votes	%	±%
Labor	Tom Tunnecliffe	3,052	53.1	−0.6
Liberal	William Richards	2,696	46.9	+0.6
Total formal votes		5,748	99.1	−0.7
Informal votes		51	0.9	+0.7
Turnout		5,799	71.3	+4.6
Labor hold		Swing	−0.6	
