= Flinders Deal =

Political deal in Australia

The Flinders Deal was a deal created in 1918 between the major political parties of the time to introduce a system of preferential voting for use on a federal level for the House of Representatives in Australia. The deal was introduced as an attempt by the Hughes Government to prevent the right-of-centre parties from splitting their support to the benefit of the Labor party.

The deal receives its name from the by-election responsible for its creation. In 1918 the Victorian electorate of Flinders had a by-election after the resignation of Nationalist MP Sir William Irvine. The Victorian Farmers Union had proposed to run a spoiler candidate to stop the Nationalist Party candidate, Stanley Bruce from winning the election. To prevent this, the Nationalist party formed a deal with the Victorian Farmers Union to introduce preferential voting so long as the Victorian Farmers Union party did not run a candidate. The Victorian Farmers Union kept to the agreement and in October of 1918, after witnessing the devastating affects to the Nationalist Party vote at the Swan by-election, the Hughes government swiftly introduced preferential voting which allowed for the first Victorian Farmers Union candidate to be elected to the House of Representatives on preferences, despite having 4000 fewer primary votes than the Labor candidate James Scullin.
