= Town and Country Planning Association (Victoria) =

The Town and Country Planning Association (Victoria) is a planning organization established on the model of the original English Town and Country Planning Association, which itself evolved out of the Garden city movement. It is a non-profit organisation funded by members' subscriptions.

The Victorian Town Planning and Parks Association was formed in Melbourne in 1914 with Dr. (later Sir) J. W. Barrett as its first president. The objects of the association were: to give the town a bit of the country, and the country a bit of the town, to secure better housing, to protect existing parks, to safeguard native animals, plants and erect memorials to explorers. Its current objectives include promoting ecological sustainability, encouraging environmental planning and an effective strategic planning framework, and educating and inspiring popular support for environmental planning.

The Association adopted a new constitution and was incorporated in 1994. Among its presidents have been businessman Ken Myer (1953–1958), and the academic and architectural historian Miles Lewis.

As of 2016, it was the only organisation of its kind in Australia, and the only way that can trace its lineage to the Garden City Association founded by Ebenezer Howard.

== See also ==
- Urban planning in Australia
