= Electoral district of Wangaratta and Rutherglen =

Former state electoral district of Victoria, Australia

Coordinates: 36°12′S 146°25′E

Wangaratta and Rutherglen Victoria—Legislative Assembly
- State: Victoria
- Created: 1889
- Abolished: 1904
- Demographic: Rural

Wangaratta and Rutherglen was an electoral district of the Legislative Assembly in the Australian state of Victoria from 1889 to 1904. It was located around the towns of Wangaratta and Rutherglen. When it was abolished in 1904, the new Electoral district of Wangaratta was created; John Bowser was the last member for Wangaratta and Rutherglen and the first for Wangaratta.

== Members ==
Member	Term
Henry Parfitt	Apr. 1889 – Apr. 1892
George Phillipson	May 1892 – Sep. 1894
John Bowser	Oct. 1894 – May 1904
