= Jonas Levien =

Australian politician

Jonas Felix Australia Levien (28 March 1840 – 24 May 1906) was an Australian politician, a member of the Victorian Legislative Assembly from 1871 to 1877 and from 1880 until his death.

Born in Williamstown, Colony of New South Wales to Benjamin Goldsmith Levien and Eliza Lindo (who both arrived in the Colony of New South Wales from England in 1839), he attended Geelong Grammar School before becoming a farmer at Drysdale. He served as a director for several companies, and his own was a major grower in the Mildura area. On 15 March 1871 he married Clara (née Levien) in Sydney, with whom he had four children. He was a Bellarine Shire Councillor from 1869 to 1975 and president from 1870 to 1872.

In April 1871 Levien was elected to the Victorian Legislative Assembly as the member for South Grant; he transferred to Barwon in 1877 but was unseated in December of that year on the grounds that he had paid canvassers. He served as the member for Barwon again from 1880 to 1906. Levien was Minister of Mines and Agriculture from 8 March 1883 to 18 February 1886. He died in St Kilda on 24 May 1906.

Victorian Legislative Assembly
Preceded by Peter Lalor; William Stutt	Member for South Grant; Apr 1871 – Apr 1877; Served alongside: John Rout Hopkins	Succeeded by seat abolished
Preceded by new creation	Member for Barwon; May 1877 – Dec 1877	Succeeded by John Ince
Preceded by John Ince	Member for Barwon; May 1880 – May 1906	Succeeded by James Farish Farrer
