= Fred Katz =

Australian politician

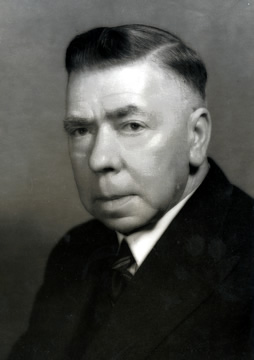

Senator for Victoria
- In office 1 July 1947 – 19 March 1951

Personal details
- Born: Frederick Carl Katz; 21 May 1877 Adelaide, South Australia
- Died: 13 December 1960 (aged 83) Albert Park, Victoria, Australia
- Party: Australian Labor Party
- Other party: Victorian Socialist Party
- Spouse: Alicia Watkins (m. 1900)
- Occupation: Clerk, unionist

Frederick Carl Katz (21 May 1877 – 13 December 1960) was an Australian trade unionist and politician. He had a long association with the Australian labour movement, holding senior leadership positions with the Federated Clerks' Union, Federal Miscellaneous Workers' Union, and the Melbourne Trades Hall. He served as a Senator for Victoria from 1947 to 1951, representing the Australian Labor Party (ALP).

== Early life ==
Katz was born on 21 May 1877 in Adelaide, South Australia. He was the son of Jane (née Wiltshire) and Carl August Katz. His father was a goldsmith and jeweller of German ethnicity, although he was born in France; he had arrived in Australia in 1876. Katz and his family moved to Melbourne when he was a boy. By 1899 he was living in Fitzroy and working as a packer. He married Alicia Watkins in April 1900, with whom he had one daughter.

== Labour movement ==
Katz was a member of the Social Democratic Party of Victoria before joining the Victorian Socialist Party (VSP), a Marxist organisation, upon its formation in 1906. He spoke regularly at party meetings, and was a vocal opponent of electoral cooperation with the Australian Labor Party (ALP). In 1909, Katz was elected assistant secretary of the Federated Carters' and Drivers' Industrial Union. He moved to Tasmania in 1911, in order to re-organise the local branch of the union, and succeeded in increasing its membership from 30 to more than 400 within a few months. While in Tasmania, he was responsible for introducing John Curtin – a fellow VSP member – to his future wife Elsie. Katz led successful strikes in Hobart and Launceston, but enthusiasm later declined and he resigned his positions in January 1914 in order to return to Melbourne.

During World War I, Katz was assistant state secretary of the Federated Clerks' Union. He was an opponent of conscription, and in 1915 he successful moved that the Melbourne Trades Hall ignore correspondence sent by the Federal Parliamentary War Committee. As a result of that, and likely also due to his German background, he was publicly tarred and feathered on 22 December 1915 by several men in military uniform, outside his office in Little Collins Street. A military inquiry was established but was unable to determine the identity of those involved.

Katz was federal secretary of the Federated Clerks' Union of Australia from 1920 to 1940, and was also state president. He also served as state secretary and general secretary of the Federated Miscellaneous Workers' Union of Australia (1922–1927), and president of the Melbourne Trades Hall Council (1937–1938). During World War II, he represented the unions on the Cargo Control Committee, and was a deputy member of the Victorian Industrial Court of Appeals.

== Politics ==
Katz rescinded his earlier opposition to the ALP after World War I and served on the state executive for a number of years. He stood for Warrnambool at the 1921 Victorian state election, for the Division of Henty at the 1931 federal election, and at the 1934 Nunawading state by-election, on each occasion unsuccessfully. He was also an unsuccessful candidate for the South Melbourne City Council in 1935. The Age jokingly labeled him "de facto president of the Defeated Candidates' Association".

=== Senate ===
Katz was elected to the Senate at the 1946 federal election, in what was seen as a reward for years of service. His term began on 1 July 1947, just over a month after his 70th birthday. He was a member of the Senate Standing Committee on Regulations and Ordinances and in 1951 served as chairman of the Select Committee on the Commonwealth Bank Bill. In 1949, Katz was one of only four ALP members to oppose the Chifley government's National Emergency (Coal Strike) Bill, which made it an offence for unions to use their funds to support the New South Wales coal strike. By the time he reached the Senate he had become an anti-communist, although he opposed the Menzies Government's attempts to ban the Communist Party of Australia as he believed they were counter-productive.

== Later life ==
Katz lost his seat at the 1951 federal election, following a double dissolution. He died at his home in Albert Park on 13 December 1960, aged 83.
