= John Ince (Australian politician) =

Australian politician

John Ince (c.1831 – 14 May 1897), was an Australian politician, member of the Victorian Legislative Assembly.

Ince was born in Ballynotan, Queen's County, Ireland, son of Robert Ince and his wife Mary, née Barrett. He arrived in Melbourne around 1854, and established a provision store in Geelong, Victoria, circa 1857. Later, Ince became a stock dealer. He was a Councillor for West Geelong 1875 to 1878, 1881 to 1890; and was mayor 1884 to 1885 and 1888 to 1889. Ince was member of the Victorian Legislative Assembly for Barwon from December 1877 to February 1880.

Ince died in Geelong on 14 May 1897.
