= James Barrett (academic) =

Australian ophthalmologist and academic administrator (1862–1945)

Sir James Barrett KBE CB CMG
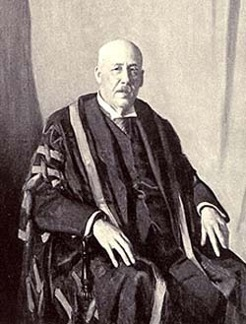
- James Barrett c. 1914
- Born: 27 February 1862; South Melbourne, Victoria, Australia
- Died: 6 April 1945 (aged 83)
- Education: University of Melbourne; King's College London
- Military career
- Allegiance: Australia
- Branch: Australian Imperial Force; Australian Red Cross Society
- Service years: 1914–1919
- Rank: Lieutenant colonel
- Conflicts: First World War; Gallipoli campaign

Sir James William Barrett, KBE, CB, CMG (27 February 1862 – 6 April 1945) was an Australian ophthalmologist and academic administrator.

Born in South Melbourne, Victoria, Australia, he was educated at the University of Melbourne and King's College London.

During World War I he organised a successful open-air hospital in the grounds of Luna Park, Cairo, for military casualties from the Gallipoli landings.

He served as Vice-Chancellor of the University of Melbourne from 1931 to 1934, and then as Chancellor from 1935 to 1939. He was President of the British Medical Association from 1935 to 1936, and the inaugural president of the Victorian Town Planning and Parks Association, now the Town and Country Planning Association. He was a notable supporter of Jewish refugee migration to Australia by persons fleeing Nazism.

== Bibliography ==
- The Australian medical corps in Egypt (1918)
- The twin ideals: An educated Commonwealth (1918)
- The war work of the Y.M.C.A. In Egypt (1919)
- A vision of the possible (1919)
- The diary of an Australian soldier (1921)
- Save Australia (1925)

Academic offices
Preceded by Sir John Monash	Vice-Chancellor of the University of Melbourne; 1931–1934	Succeeded by Sir Raymond Priestley
Preceded by Sir John MacFarland	Chancellor of the University of Melbourne; 1935–1939	Succeeded by Sir John Greig Latham
