= Martin Hannah =

Australian politician

Martin Hannah (28 February 1865 – 27 March 1953) was an Australian politician. He was a member of the Victorian Legislative Assembly from 1902 to 1906 (for Railway Officers) and from 1908 to 1921 (for Collingwood). He was a member of the Australian Labor Party for most of his career; he was briefly expelled for several months in 1910 and then permanently expelled in 1920 after losing preselection and recontesting as an independent candidate, sitting as an independent for the remainder of his career.

== Early life and union movement ==
Hannah was born in Whroo, Victoria. He left school aged eleven and worked in a cordial factory, then as an alluvial miner and contractor near Murchison. He moved to Melbourne at sixteen, initially working as a bread carter before entering the bricklaying trade. He held a number of prominent positions in the labour movement, including secretary of the Victorian Operative Bricklayers Society, president of the Melbourne Trades Hall Council, inaugural president of the Political Labour Council, secretary of the Vigilance Committee of Building Trades and president and secretary of the May Day Celebration Committee. He was also an enthusiastic supporter of women's suffrage organisations. Hannah was the unsuccessful Labor candidate for Bourke at the 1901 and 1903 federal elections.

Around 1886 he married Elizabeth Ann May, with whom he had four children. She died on 19 January 1918. He then married Jane Elizabeth Satchell in 1920.

== Political career ==
In 1902, he was elected to the Victorian Legislative Assembly as the Labor member for Railway Officers. The Railway Officers seat was abolished in 1906, and Hannah unsuccessfully contested Prahran. However, he returned to parliament when he won the Collingwood seat in 1908.

In August 1910, he was expelled from the Labor Party for co-founding the Commonwealth Protectionist Association, but after continuing opposition to the expulsion from various branches was readmitted following a special state conference to deal with the issue in November 1910.

He was minister without portfolio in the first Labor government in Victoria, the two-week Elmslie government of December 1913.

In June 1920, Hannah lost preselection to recontest Collingwood at the 1920 election to T. A. McAllen, state vice-president of the Victorian Liquor Trades Association. Hannah contested the election as an independent, resulting in his expulsion from the party, and defeated McAllen. He attempted to win a second term as an independent at the 1921 election, but was soundly defeated by Labor candidate and future party leader Tom Tunnecliffe.

He made two unsuccessful attempts to return to parliament, both times as an independent: at the 1922 federal election for the seat of Batman and at a 1928 state by-election for Brighton, losing his deposit on the latter occasion.

== Later life ==
In later years, Hannah was often described as an expert on forestry and the uses of Australian wood. He frequently undertook lecture tours on the subject of promoting and developing the Australian forestry industry (including a visit to the United States in 1926) and would often handmake gifts for prominent figures from Australian wood to promote its use, with recipients including Douglas MacArthur. In 1930, he arranged an exhibition of Australian timber at Australia House in London during the Imperial Conference. In 1935, he organised the Australian Art and Commerce Exhibition in Melbourne to promote the commercial uses of Australian timbers. Following the exhibition, he was fined nine pounds after relocating a "bark hut" from the exhibition to Little Collins Street to serve as an unauthorised one-man continuation of the effort. He was chairman of the Youth Unemployment Council in 1935, and in 1935–36, campaigned for a scheme of unemployment relief that would retrain unemployed youth in an expanded forestry industry.

Hannah also remained politically active until his death. In 1931, Hannah was the honorary secretary of the Anti-Sweating League. In 1944, Hannah succeeded Maurice Blackburn as president of the No-Conscription Campaign. In 1949, as spokesperson for group United Protestant Action, Hannah protested a state amendment that would have defined obscenity to include material seen as blasphemous, opposing the bill on the basis that it was an attack on freedom of speech. In 1950, Hannah proposed a scheme to resettle 500,000 Scottish migrants in east Gippsland.

Hannah died in 1953, aged 88, following a short illness and was buried at the Coburg Cemetery.
