= James Farrer (Australian politician) =

Australian politician

James Farish Farrer (6 January 1876 – 6 July 1967) was an Australian politician.

Farrer was born in Modewarre, where he attended state school before qualifying as a woolclasser. He became a grazier at Modewarre and later at Pirron Yallock, and on 28 February 1914 married Alice Annie Jenkins, with whom he had two sons. In June 1906 he won a by-election for the Victorian Legislative Assembly seat of Barwon. A Liberal, he served until his defeat in October 1917. Farrer retired around 1929 and died in Richmond in 1967.

Victorian Legislative Assembly
Preceded by Jonas Levien	Member for Barwon; 1906–1917	Succeeded by Duncan McLennan
