= Edward Morley (politician) =

Australian politician

Edward Morley (7 February 1873 – 5 June 1929) was an Australian politician.

Morley was born in Malmsbury, Victoria to quarryman George Morley and Mary Cahill. He was a storekeeper at Sorrento then a publican at Numurkah before becoming an estate agent/auctioneer in Melbourne with an affiliate office in Temora NSW. Around 1896 he married Maggie Emmerson, with whom he had a son (Reginald). During World War I he was a captain in the Australian Imperial Force, and was wounded and invalided home.

In 1920 Morley was elected to the Victorian Legislative Assembly for Barwon as an independent Nationalist, but he was an official Nationalist from 1921. He was Assistant Minister of Public Works from 22 November 1928 until his death in Brighton in 1929. Morley was captain of Sorrento Football Club for at least 4 years (sometimes referred to as The Terrible Morlie Maru a prolific poet) until 1906. Contrary to newspaper reports claiming a fire razed his double-story limestone building in 1908, it survives to this day. Morley was more interested in establishing a lawn bowls club during his 5-year stay in Numurkah (1906–11). The Bowls Club gave him a grand farewell.

Malmsbury Cemetery online records show no Edward Morley despite a very public burial attended by politicians. Instead it records an Edwin Morley with same birth and death details as Edward. The cemetery trust has been advised.

Victorian Legislative Assembly
Preceded by Duncan McLennan	Member for Barwon; 1920–1929	Succeeded by Thomas Maltby
