= 1920 Victorian state election =

Australian state election

- 21 October 1920

All 65 seats in the Victorian Legislative Assembly 33 seats needed for a majority
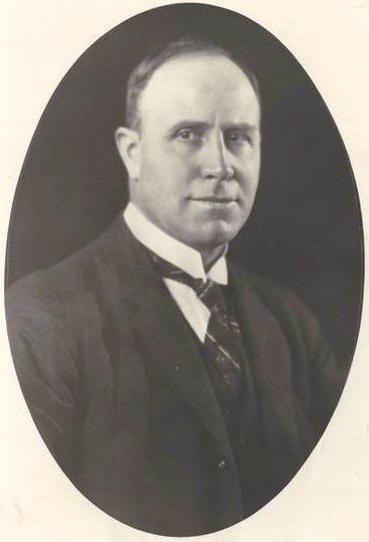

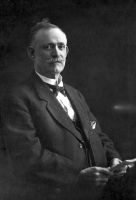

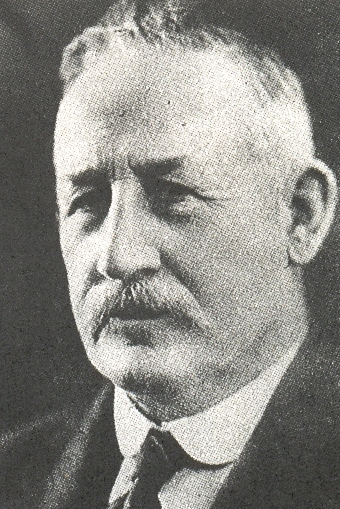
	First party	Second party	Third party
Leader	Harry Lawson	George Prendergast	John Allan
Party	Nationalist	Labor	Victorian Farmers
Leader since	May 1918	18 June 1918
Leader's seat	Castlemaine and Maldon	North Melbourne	Rodney
Last election	40 seats	18 seats	4 seats
Seats won	30 seats	20 seats	13 seats
Seat change	▼10	▲2	▲9
Percentage	47.95%	29.28%	14.41%
Swing	▼9.03	▼3.00	▲8.28
Premier before election
Harry Lawson
Nationalist
Elected Premier
Harry Lawson
Nationalist

The 1920 Victorian state election was held in the Australian state of Victoria on Thursday 21 October 1920 to elect the 65 members of the state's Legislative Assembly.

== Background ==
The Nationalist party had reunited after the 1917 election in which the Nationalist members supporting John Bowser defeated those supporting the former premier Alexander Peacock over his decision to increase country rail fares, and formed a majority government with 40 members. Bowser resigned as premier in March 1918, having little taste for the office, and was replaced by Peacock supporter Harry Lawson.

Meanwhile, in rural Victoria, the Victorian Farmers' Union had been gathering support and was looking to gain more seats from the Nationalists in these regions. This election would be their debut as a major force in Victorian politics where neither the Nationalists and their successors or Labor could form government without their support (or that of their successors, the Country Party) until 1952.

== Results ==
=== Legislative Assembly ===
1920 Victorian state election Legislative Assembly << 1917–1921 >>
Enrolled voters	735,054				
Votes cast	468,223		Turnout	63.70	+9.49
Informal votes	20,593		Informal	4.40	+1.25
Summary of votes by party
Party	Primary votes	%	Swing	Seats	Change
Nationalist	214,650	47.95	−9.03	30	–10
Labor	131,083	29.28	–3.00	20	+2
Victorian Farmers	64,500	14.41	+8.28	13	+9
Ind. Nationalist	22,448	5.01	*	1	+1
Independent	14,949	3.34	+0.98	1	+1
Total	447,630			65	

Notes:

- Eleven seats were uncontested at this election, and were retained by the incumbent parties:
  - Nationalist (3): Allandale, Gippsland West, Ovens
  - Labor (7): Abbotsford, Carlton, Flemington, Port Fairy, Richmond, Warrenheip, Williamstown
  - VFU (1): Wangaratta

== See also ==
- Candidates of the 1920 Victorian state election
- Members of the Victorian Legislative Assembly, 1920–1921
- 1919 Victorian Legislative Council election
