= Electoral district of Eaglehawk =

Former electoral district of Victoria, Australia

Eaglehawk Victoria—Legislative Assembly
- State: Victoria
- Created: 1889
- Abolished: 1927
- Namesake: Eaglehawk, Victoria
- Demographic: Rural
- Coordinates: 36°43′S 144°15′E

Electoral district of Eaglehawk was an electoral district of the Legislative Assembly in the Australian state of Victoria. It was created by the Electoral Act Amendment Act 1888, taking effect at the 1889 elections. It was abolished by the Electoral Districts Act 1926 (taking effect at the 1927 elections) when several new districts were created.

== Members for Eaglehawk ==
Member	Party	Term
Henry Williams	Unaligned	1889–1902
Hay Kirkwood	Ministerial	1902–1907
Tom Tunnecliffe	Labor	1907–1920
Albert Dunstan	Vic. Farmers/ Country	1920–1927
