= Electoral district of Barwon (Victoria) =

Former state electoral district in Victoria, Australia

Barwon Victoria—Legislative Assembly
- State: Victoria
- Created: 1877
- Abolished: 1955
- Namesake: Barwon river
- Demographic: Rural
- Coordinates: 38°12′S 144°20′E

Barwon was an electoral district of the Legislative Assembly in the Australian state of Victoria from 1877 to 1955.

== Members ==
Member	Party	Term
Jonas Levien	Unaligned	1877
John Ince	Unaligned	1877–1880
Jonas Levien	Unaligned	1880–1906
James Farrer	Liberal	1906–1917
Duncan McLennan	Nationalist	1917–1920
Edward Morley	Independent Nationalist	1920–1921
Edward Morley	Nationalist	1921–1929
Thomas Maltby	Nationalist	1929–1931
Thomas Maltby	UAP	1931–1945
Thomas Maltby	Independent Liberal	1945–1946
Thomas Maltby	Liberal	1946–1949
Thomas Maltby	Liberal and Country	1949–1955

== Area ==
THE ELECTORAL DISTRICT OF BARWON. Commencing at a point on the Barwon River where the north boundary of the St. Leonards pre-emptive section abuts thereon; thence east and north by the south and east boundaries of the parish of Carrung-e-murnong to the north-west angle of section 10 parish of Gnarwarre; thence easterly by a road to a point in the west boundary of section 14 parish of Barrarbool; thence south by that section and section 4 to the Waurn Ponds; thence easterly by the Waurn Ponds to the east boundary of section 7; thence north by that section section 11 and a road to the north-east angle of section 25; thence west by a road to the Barwon River aforesaid; thence by that river downwards to the road forming the west boundary of section 3 parish of Moolap; thence north by that road to Corio Bay; thence north-easterly southerly and south-westerly by the shores of that bay Geelong Harbor Port Phillip Bay and Bass Strait to the Salt Creek; thence north-westerly by that creek the boundary between the parishes of Wormbete and Wensleydale and Hopkins' Creek to the Barwon River aforesaid; and thence again by that river downwards to the commencing point: including Mud Island and the electors in the lighthouses and ships off the coast.
