= Tom Tunnecliffe =

Australian politician

The Honourable Tom Tunnecliffe
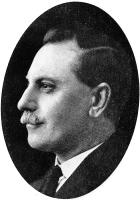

Leader of the Opposition of Victoria Elections: 1932, 1935, 1937
- In office 13 July 1932 – 2 April 1935
- Premier: Sir Stanley Argyle
- Deputy: John Cain Sr.
- Preceded by: Sir Stanley Argyle
- Succeeded by: Sir Stanley Argyle

Leader of the Labor Party in Victoria
- In office 13 July 1932 – 19 October 1937
- Deputy: John Cain Sr.
- Preceded by: Edmond Hogan
- Succeeded by: John Cain Sr.

Member of the Victorian Legislative Assembly for Collingwood
- In office 30 August 1921 – 30 July 1947
- Preceded by: Martin Hannah
- Succeeded by: Bill Towers

Member of the Victorian Legislative Assembly for Eaglehawk
- In office 15 March 1907 – 21 October 1920
- Preceded by: Hay Kirkwood
- Succeeded by: Albert Dunstan

Member of the Victorian Legislative Assembly for West Melbourne
- In office 21 December 1903 – 11 May 1904
- Preceded by: William Maloney
- Succeeded by: Seat abolished

Personal details
- Born: 13 July 1869 Ascot, Victoria
- Died: 2 February 1948 (aged 78) Clifton Hill, Victoria, Australia
- Party: Labor Party
- Spouse(s): Florence Bertha Bishop (1907–1911; her death); Bertha Louise Gross (1912–1948; his death)
- Children: 2
- Occupation: Bootmaker, union official and publicist

Thomas Tunnecliffe (13 July 1869 – 2 February 1948) was an Australian politician. Representing the Australian Labor Party, he was a member of the Victorian Legislative Assembly for the electorates of West Melbourne (1903–1904), Eaglehawk (1907–1920) and Collingwood (1921–1947).

Tunnecliffe was a bootmaker by trade, and became president of the Victorian Operative Bootmakers' Union in the 1880s. He was heavily involved in a number of radical political organisations around the turn of the century, including the Victorian Socialist League. He also served as president of the Victorian Trades Hall Council and the Eight Hours Committee. In 1903, representing the Labor Party, he won a by-election for the Legislative Assembly seat of West Melbourne. However, the electorate was abolished six months later following a redistribution, and Tunnecliffe did not return to the Victorian parliament until 1907, when he won the seat of Eaglehawk in the Bendigo region. After his defeat in 1920 by the Country Party candidate, Albert Dunstan, Tunnecliffe went back to Melbourne and was elected to the Assembly in 1921 as the member for Collingwood, a seat he held for the next 26 years.

In 1924, he served as Chief Secretary in the brief Labor ministry of George Prendergast, and was elected by his parliamentary colleagues as deputy leader in 1926. When the Hogan Labor government came to power a year later, Tunnecliffe was appointed Minister for Railways and Electrical Undertakings. In the second Hogan ministry, formed after the 1929 state election, he was once again made Chief Secretary.

In February 1932, at the height of the Great Depression, Premier Hogan travelled to London to talk to the banks about Victoria's desperate economic plight. While he was away, Tunnecliffe was acting Premier, and was much more willing than Hogan to reject the Premiers' Plan, which demanded stringent reductions in government spending. As a result, the Country Party withdrew its support from the minority Labor government and, in April, the government was defeated in a confidence vote.

Tunnecliffe, as acting leader, led the Labor campaign in the May 1932 state election, now completely rejecting the Premiers' Plan, which was the main issue at the election. The Labor Party Executive expelled everyone who had supported the Plan, including Hogan, although Labor did not run a candidate against him. Tunnecliffe was elected leader of the party. At the election, the newly-formed United Australia Party (UAP) won 31 seats to Labor's 16 and the reunited Country Party's 14. Hogan and one of his ex-ministers were elected as "Premiers' Plan Labor" candidates. The UAP leader, Stanley Argyle, became Premier of Victoria.

Tunnecliffe was Opposition leader until the 1935 state election, when Labor won only 17 seats and finished with third-party status, thereby not even qualifying as the official Opposition. Due to the weighting of country votes, the United Country Party polled only 13.7% of the popular vote and won 20 seats, whereas Labor's 37.9% only garnered it 17 seats.

Tunnecliffe was a close friend of the businessman and gambling boss John Wren. In the view of some, Tunnecliffe was under Wren's control. Wren was also very close to Albert Dunstan, who was now the leader of the United Country Party. It has been claimed that, due to Wren's influence, Labor supported Dunstan's minority government from 1935 until 1943.

Following the 1937 state election, Tunnecliffe was succeeded as leader of the Labor Party in Victoria by John Cain, Snr. Tunnecliffe was Speaker of the Legislative Assembly from 1937 to 1940, and continued as the member for Collingwood until July 1947, when he resigned due to ill-health. He died six months later.

Victorian Legislative Assembly
Preceded by William Maloney	Member of the Legislative Assembly for West Melbourne; 1903–1904	Succeeded by District abolished
Preceded by Hay Kirkwood	Member of the Legislative Assembly for Eaglehawk; 1907–1920	Succeeded by Albert Dunstan
Preceded by Martin Hannah	Member of the Legislative Assembly for Collingwood; 1921–1947	Succeeded by William Towers
Party political offices
Preceded by Edmond Hogan	Leader of the Labor Party in Victoria; 1932–1937	Succeeded by John Cain (senior)
Political offices
Preceded by Sir Stanley Argyle	Leader of the Opposition of Victoria; 1932–1935	Succeeded by Sir Stanley Argyle
Preceded by William Everard	Speaker of the Victorian Legislative Assembly; 1937–1940	Succeeded by Bill Slater
