= Duncan McLennan =

Australian politician

Duncan McLennan (17 September 1861 – 21 May 1946) was an Australian politician.

He was born in Strathalbyn in South Australia to farmer Kenneth McLennan and Margaret McGregor. The family moved to Ailsa in Victoria around 1873, and McLennan became a farmer in the area. Around 1890 he married Willena McDonald, with whom he had three children. He served on Dimboola Shire Council from 1889 to 1890. He moved to Geelong in 1910, where he was director of Federal Woollen Mills and from 1913 to 1937 Melbourne Harbour Trust commissioner. He was closely involved with non-Labor politics as a founding chairman of the People's Party, and in 1917 was elected to the Victorian Legislative Assembly for Barwon for the Nationalist Party's Economy faction. He was defeated in 1920 and failed in an attempt to return to the parliament in 1921. McLennan died in Geelong in 1946.

Victorian Legislative Assembly
Preceded by James Farrer	Member for Barwon; 1917–1920	Succeeded by Edward Morley
