= 1921 Victorian state election =

Australian state election

- 30 August 1921

All 65 seats in the Victorian Legislative Assembly 33 seats needed for a majority
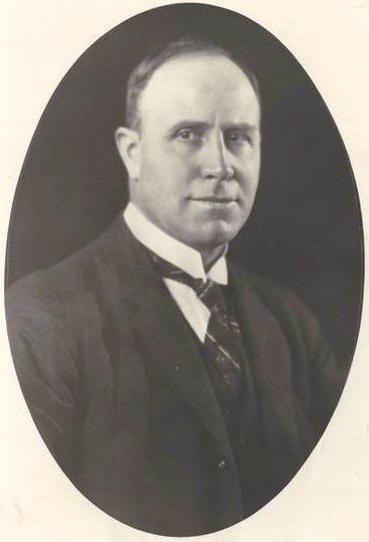

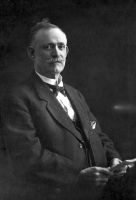

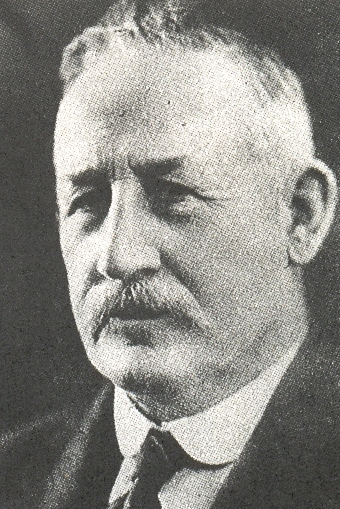
| | First party | Second party | Third party |
|---|---|---|---|
| Leader | Harry Lawson | George Prendergast | John Allan |
| Party | Nationalist | Labor | Victorian Farmers |
| Leader since | May 1918 | 18 June 1918 |
| Leader's seat | Castlemaine and Maldon | North Melbourne | Rodney |
| Last election | 30 seats | 20 seats | 13 seats |
| Seats won | 31 seats | 21 seats | 12 seats |
| Seat change | ▲1 | ▲1 | ▼1 |
| Percentage | 45.59% | 35.69% | 14.01% |
| Swing | ▼2.36 | ▲6.38 | ▼0.40 |
Premier before election
Harry Lawson
Nationalist
Elected Premier
Harry Lawson
Nationalist

The 1921 Victorian state election was held in the Australian state of Victoria on Tuesday 30 August 1921 to elect the 65 members of the state's Legislative Assembly.

== Background ==
The trigger for the 1921 Victorian election was a dissolution of parliament caused by the Victorian Farmers' Union voting with Labor to defeat Harry Lawson's minority Nationalist government after Lawson, who was also the agriculture minister, had abolished the compulsory wheat pool operating in the state.

== Results ==
=== Legislative Assembly ===
1921 Victorian state election Legislative Assembly << 1920–1924 >>
| Enrolled voters | 569,704 | | | | |
| Votes cast | 326,227 | | Turnout | 57.26 | −6.44 |
| Informal votes | 2,555 | | Informal | 0.78 | −3.61 |
Summary of votes by party
| Party | Primary votes | % | Swing | Seats | Change |
| Nationalist | 147,569 | 45.59 | −2.36 | 31 | +1 |
| Labor | 115,432 | 35.69 | +6.38 | 21 | +1 |
| Victorian Farmers | 45,348 | 14.01 | −0.40 | 12 | −1 |
| Independent | 15,323 | 4.73 | −1.52 | 1 | 0 |
| Total | 323,672 | | | 65 | |

Notes:

- Nineteen seats were uncontested at this election, and were retained by the incumbent parties:
  - Nationalist (11): Benambra, Boroondara, Brighton, Bulla, Dalhousie, Gippsland West, Hawthorn, Ovens, Toorak, Walhalla, Waranga
  - Labor (7): Abbotsford, Carlton, Melbourne, North Melbourne, Port Melbourne, Richmond, Williamstown
  - Victorian Farmers' Union (1): Wangaratta

== See also ==
- Candidates of the 1921 Victorian state election
- Members of the Victorian Legislative Assembly, 1921–1924
- 1922 Victorian Legislative Council election
