= John Bowser =

Australian politician

Sir John Bowser
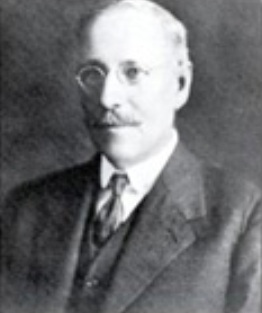

26th Premier of Victoria
- In office 29 November 1917 – 21 March 1918
- Preceded by: Alexander Peacock
- Succeeded by: Harry Lawson

13th Speaker of the Victorian Legislative Assembly
- In office 30 April 1924 – 5 March 1927
- Preceded by: John Mackey
- Succeeded by: Oswald Snowball

Personal details
- Born: 2 September 1856 Islington, London, England, UK
- Died: 10 June 1936 (aged 79) Wangaratta, Victoria, Australia
- Party: Nationalist
- Spouse: Frances Rogers (m. 1914)
- Education: University of Edinburgh

Sir John Bowser (2 September 1856 – 10 June 1936), Australian politician, was the 26th Premier of Victoria. He was born in London, the son of an army officer, and arrived in Melbourne as a child with his family. He grew up at Bacchus Marsh and when he left school got a job with the Bacchus Marsh Express. As a young man he went to Scotland and worked on newspapers while studying at University of Edinburgh. Returning to Australia, he settled in Wangaratta, where he farmed and managed the Wangaratta Chronicle, which he eventually bought.

In October 1894, Bowser was elected to the Victorian Legislative Assembly for Wangaratta and Rutherglen. Wangaratta and Rutherglen was renamed to Electoral district of Wangaratta in 1906, and was renamed again to Electoral district of Wangaratta and Ovens in 1927. Bowser held the seat until November 1929. In total Bowser represented Wangaratta, in its different names, for 35 years. He was Minister of Public Instruction in the Liberal government of Thomas Bent in 1908–1909, but thereafter did not hold office again until he became Premier. He emerged as one of the leaders of the conservative rural faction of the Liberal Party, known as the Economy Party, concerned with getting roads and railways to their districts, cutting government expenditure, and keeping country areas over-represented in the Assembly.

In 1917, the Liberal Premier, Alexander Peacock, increased country rail fares, arguing that the Victorian Railways would otherwise become insolvent. In protest, Bowser led his faction into opposition, and at the election in November, Bowser's followers won 27 seats, to Labor's 18, the Peacock Liberals' 12 and the Victorian Farmers Union's four. Peacock resigned and Bowser became Premier. He rescinded Peacock's rail fares increases, but had no answer to the larger problem of railway finances. In May 1918, he was defeated in the Assembly when all the other parties voted against a railways estimates bill.

Bowser, who had little taste for office, immediately resigned, and a Peacock Liberal, Harry Lawson, formed a composite ministry of the various Liberal factions, with Bowser as Chief Secretary and Minister for Public Health, posts he held until 1919. In 1921, he joined the newly formed Country Party. In 1924, he was elected Speaker of the Victorian Legislative Assembly, which was becoming a traditional honour for former Premiers. He was knighted in 1927 and retired from politics in 1929.

In 1922, a railway station just north of Wangaratta was named after him.

Political offices
Preceded by Alexander Peacock	Premier of Victoria; 1917–1918	Succeeded by Harry Lawson
Victorian Legislative Assembly
Preceded by George Phillipson	Member for Wangaratta and Rutherglen; 1894–1904	District abolished
District created	Member for Wangaratta; 1904–1927	District abolished
District created	Member for Wangaratta and Ovens; 1927–1929	Succeeded by Lot Diffey
Preceded by Sir John Mackey	Speaker of the Victorian Legislative Assembly; 1924–1927	Succeeded by Oswald Snowball
