= Electoral district of Wangaratta =

Former state electoral district of Victoria, Australia

Coordinates: 36°21′S 146°20′E

Wangaratta Victoria—Legislative Assembly
- State: Victoria
- Created: 1904
- Abolished: 1927
- Namesake: Town of Wangaratta
- Demographic: Rural

The Electoral district of Wangaratta was an electoral district of the Victorian Legislative Assembly. It was created in the redistribution of 1904, the Electoral district of Wangaratta and Rutherglen being abolished.

The district of Wangaratta was defined in the Electoral District Boundaries Act 1903, parts of the boundary included: "the junction of the Indigo Creek with the Murray River ... north boundary of the parish of Chiltern ... the Ovens River; thence south easterly by that river to the west boundary of the parish of Whorouly; ... the south boundaries of the parishes of Whorouly and Myrtleford to the Buffalo River; thence southerly by that river to Mount Howitt; thence north-westerly by a direct line to a point on the west branch of the King River ... the boundary of the township of Glenrowen [sic]..."

Wangaratta was abolished in the redistribution of 1927, a new Electoral district of Wangaratta and Ovens was created at that time. John Bowser represented Wangaratta and Ovens from July 1927, retiring from parliament in 1929.

== Members of Wangaratta ==
John Bowser was member for Wangaratta and Rutherglen until the 1904 election.

Member	Party	Term
Sir John Bowser	Unaligned	1904–1916
Sir John Bowser	Nationalist	1916–1921
Sir John Bowser	Country	1921–1927

== See also ==
- Parliaments of the Australian states and territories
- Members of the Victorian Legislative Assembly
