= Victorian Farmers' Union =

Association of farmers in Victoria, Australia

The Victorian Farmers' Union (VFU) was an association of farmers and primary producers formed in 1914 in the Australian state of Victoria. Although initially formed as an "absolutely non-political" entity, the VFU became a political party in 1916, and nominated candidates for the 1917 state election and subsequent elections. In later years it used the names Victorian Country Party, then United Country Party and is now the National Party of Australia – Victoria. At the 1917 election, because the support for the VFU was concentrated in rural seats, it won four of the 11 seats in the Victorian Legislative Assembly it contested, gaining about 6% of the vote statewide. In 1918 it also won its first seat in the federal parliament, after preferential voting was introduced. At the 1920 state election the VFU vote increased to 8% and the number of seats to 13, giving the VFU the balance of power in the state Legislative Assembly.

The VFU was a precursor to the Country Party in Victoria, which merged with other state parties to become the federal Country Party, later the National Party of Australia.

== Proposal and formation ==
The proposal to form the Union was made in a meeting of several farmers at Thorburn's Hotel in Woodend on 18 April 1914.

The attendees at the meeting agreed upon the following resolutions regarding the formation of the association:

1. That a Victorian Farmers' Union be formed.
2. That the qualification of membership be that they are legitimate farmers.
3. That the basis of union be absolutely non-political in the party sense.

The meeting also outlined the union's objectives:

1. To safeguard and promote the common interests of all primary producers in the State.
2. To meet labour unionism in industrial disputes with the spirit of reason and justice, and at the same time place ourselves in the best position to resist any unfair demands or unreasonable conditions being placed upon us.
3. By the application of the co-operative principle on safe and economic lines, we propose to guard against the withering influence of monopolistic combinations of every form.

The VFU was inaugurated, and held its first public meeting at Newham on 5 June 1914. While its first executive officers were appointed at this time, the VFU did little active organisation over the next two years due to the outbreak of World War I. In 1916, the VFU merged with the Farmers' Union of Victoria, an organisation with a similar name and objective, which had formed in the northern districts and was based in Melbourne. At the time of the merger, "party politics" were still prohibited as per the original resolutions, although the VFU agreed to formulate a political policy in its first conference held during Show Week later in the year. At the conference, which began on 26 September, the executive recommended that the VFU gain a parliamentary presence by admitting existing members of parliament. The proposal was rejected by the delegates, and instead it was agreed that members must join the VFU before being endorsed and nominated to stand for parliament at the next state election.

== Growth and political activity ==
At the time of the inaugural conference, the VFU consisted of 130 branches and 2,836 members, drawing its most enthusiastic (and militant) support from farmers in the wheat-growing districts of the Mallee region. From 1917 to 1920, the VFU rapidly accumulated members from amongst graziers, dairy farmers and orchardists, and by 1920 had 547 branches and 14,817 members.

On 26 September 1917, at its conference in Geelong, the VFU passed a motion to change the name of its political wing from the Victorian Farmers' Union Party to the Country Party. The party fought the 1917 Victorian state election as the Farmers' Union. It contested eleven seats in the Legislative Assembly, of which it won four: Grenville, Korong, Rodney and Swan Hill. At the 1920 state election the Farmers' Union's vote increased to 8% and the number of seats to 13, giving the Union the balance of power in the Legislative Assembly. In 1921, the Union caused the dissolution of Parliament after it voted with Labor against the Nationalist government, over the issue of abolishing the state-run wheat-marketing system which had been introduced during World War I, and which benefited small farmers by keeping wheat prices high. At the 1921 state election, the Union increased its vote to 14% but the number of seats dropped to 12, and it continued to hold the balance of power. It would retain that position until 1952.

In September 1923, Harry Lawson formed a composite ministry, Victoria's first conservative coalition, and bringing the VFU into government, with five members, with John Allan as Deputy Premier. The VFU, however, refused to support the coalition and voted it down at its annual conference in March 1924, forcing Lawson to dismiss the Country ministers and form a Nationalist cabinet.

== Splits and reconciliations ==
In 1925, the VFU suffered a major setback when John Hall (the party's candidate in the Flinders by-election), and its former core support base of Mallee wheat farmers, split from the VFU and formed a new organisation, the Primary Producers' Union (PPU). Hall, as the PPU general secretary, stated that the PPU was formed due to the lack of political unity within the VFU, as well as the failure of the parliamentary party to pursue the group's objectives, including compulsory organised marketing of primary products, reduction of tariff duties, establishment of a rural bank, and resisting centralisation.

The PPU announced it would contest all electorates in Victoria's northern wheat belt at the 1927 state election as the Country Progressive Party. At its annual conference in late March 1927, the VFU responded by changing its name to the Victorian Country Party. The new party had a broader membership, which included all "bona fide country residents" of any occupation, whereas membership of VFU had been restricted to primary producers only. At the 1927 election, the Victorian Country Party won 10 seats, while the Country Progressive Party won four. The Progressives and one independent supported Edmond Hogan's Labor party into government. In 1928 the support was withdrawn and the Nationalists formed government with VCP support. Labor won the 1929 state election, and the two Country parties eventually reconciled and merged to form the United Country Party in 1930.

Another split in the UCP took place in 1937, following the expulsion of Victorian federal MP John McEwen for supporting the federal Coalition government. McEwen's supporters formed the Liberal Country Party in Victoria and were loyal to the federal party, while the UCP remained loyal to the state party and the Victorian United Country Party Premier Albert Dunstan. The breach was resolved by 1943.

== Federal activities ==
The VFU also made several forays into federal politics. The VFU nominated John Hall for the Flinders by-election held in May 1918, as a "spoiler" strategy, threatening to split the non-Labor vote. After gaining a promise from the Nationalist Party led by Billy Hughes to replace the first-past-the-post electoral system with preferential voting, the VFU made a "strategic defeat", withdrawing Hall from the campaign. Hall's name remained on the ballot paper and he received 382 votes (1.7 per cent). After seeing the impact of a split conservative vote at the Western Australian Swan by-election held in October 1918, the federal Nationalist government quickly introduced preferential voting in time for the Corangamite by-election held in December 1918, enabling the VFU's candidate, William Gibson, to defeat the Labor candidate (future Prime Minister James Scullin) on preferences despite being over 4,000 behind on primary votes, thereby gaining the VFU its first member of the federal House of Representatives.

It gained a second member in the 1919 federal election, when Robert Cook ousted the Nationalist incumbent in Indi. In 1920, Gibson and Cook joined other rural MPs from New South Wales and Western Australia in forming the Australian Country Party led by William McWilliams from Tasmania, who held pro-rural views though not previously nominated by a state related rural party. At the time the Country Party had 11 members. Following the 1922 federal election, the Nationalists lost its majority in the House of Representatives and formed a Coalition government with the Country Party, now with 14 members, which obtained five ministers in an 11-member cabinet.
