= Results of the 1937 Victorian state election (Legislative Assembly) =

Australian state election results

Victorian state election, 2 October 1937 Legislative Assembly << 1935–1940 >>
Enrolled voters	848,680				
Votes cast	786,492		Turnout	93.96	−0.46
Informal votes	10,938		Informal	1.37	−0.28
Summary of votes by party
Party	Primary votes	%	Swing	Seats	Change
Labor	322,699	41.03	+3.10	20	+2
United Australia	311,168	39.56	+3.39	21	−3
United Country	89,286	11.35	−2.36	20	±0
Communist	5,700	0.72	−0.39	0	±0
Independent	57,639	7.33	−3.75	4	+1
Total	786,492			65	

This is a list of electoral district results for the Victorian 1937 election.

== Results by electoral district ==
=== Albert Park ===
1937 Victorian state election: Albert Park
Party	Candidate	Votes	%	±%
Labor	John Chapple	8,755	40.1	−0.5
United Australia	William Haworth	7,151	32.7	−20.7
Ind. United Australia	Harry Drew	4,117	18.8	+18.8
Independent	Leah Kloot	1,834	8.4	+8.4
Total formal votes		21,857	96.3	−1.1
Informal votes		838	3.7	+1.1
Turnout		22,695	94.2	+1.1
Two-party-preferred result
United Australia	William Haworth	11,641	53.3	−2.6
Labor	John Chapple	10,216	46.7	+2.6
United Australia hold		Swing	−2.6	

=== Allandale ===
1937 Victorian state election: Allandale
Party	Candidate	Votes	%	±%
Labor	Patrick Denigan	4,661	47.8	+5.7
Country	Russell White	2,664	27.3	+0.9
United Australia	Edward Montgomery	2,434	24.9	−6.6
Total formal votes		9,759	99.1	+0.3
Informal votes		86	0.9	−0.3
Turnout		9,845	96.1	−0.3
Two-party-preferred result
Labor	Patrick Denigan	4,925	50.6	+2.0
Country	Russell White	4,834	49.4	+49.4
Labor gain from United Australia		Swing	+2.0	

=== Ballarat ===
1937 Victorian state election: Ballarat
Party	Candidate	Votes	%	±%
United Australia	Thomas Hollway	11,363	66.5	+10.9
Labor	Arthur Loft	5,722	33.5	−10.9
Total formal votes		17,085	99.2	−0.1
Informal votes		142	0.8	+0.1
Turnout		17,227	95.3	+0.1
United Australia hold		Swing	+10.9	

=== Barwon ===
1937 Victorian state election: Barwon
Party	Candidate	Votes	%	±%
United Australia	Thomas Maltby	7,259	60.4	+4.3
Country	Warwick Cayley	4,757	39.6	+39.6
Total formal votes		12,016	98.9	+0.3
Informal votes		134	1.1	−0.3
Turnout		12,150	94.8	−0.1
United Australia hold		Swing	N/A	

=== Benalla ===
1937 Victorian state election: Benalla
Party	Candidate	Votes	%	±%
Independent	Frederick Cook	4,126	38.5	+38.5
Labor	Jack Devlin	3,836	35.8	+35.8
Country	Mervyn Huggins	2,762	25.8	−74.2
Total formal votes		10,724	98.9	
Informal votes		117	1.1	
Turnout		10,841	95.0	
Two-candidate-preferred result
Independent	Frederick Cook	5,806	54.1	+54.1
Labor	Jack Devlin	4,918	45.9	+45.9
Independent gain from Country		Swing	N/A	

=== Benambra ===
1937 Victorian state election: Benambra
Party	Candidate	Votes	%	±%
Country	Roy Paton	5,072	60.4	+7.6
United Australia	Thomas Mitchell	3,329	39.6	−7.6
Total formal votes		8,401	99.3	+0.9
Informal votes		61	0.7	−0.9
Turnout		8,462	94.5	+0.8
Country hold		Swing	+7.6	

=== Bendigo ===
1937 Victorian state election: Bendigo
Party	Candidate	Votes	%	±%
Labor	Arthur Cook	unopposed		
Labor hold		Swing		

=== Boroondara ===
1937 Victorian state election: Boroondara
Party	Candidate	Votes	%	±%
United Australia	Trevor Oldham	unopposed		
United Australia hold		Swing		

=== Brighton ===
1937 Victorian state election: Brighton
Party	Candidate	Votes	%	±%
United Australia	Ian MacFarlan	21,539	82.0	+30.9
Communist	Gerald O'Day	4,737	18.0	+18.0
Total formal votes		26,276	97.8	−0.6
Informal votes		593	2.2	+0.6
Turnout		26,869	92.7	−2.3
United Australia hold		Swing	N/A	

=== Brunswick ===
1937 Victorian state election: Brunswick
Party	Candidate	Votes	%	±%
Labor	James Jewell	18,144	74.0	−26.0
United Australia	Charles Hartley	6,384	26.0	+26.0
Total formal votes		24,528	98.6	
Informal votes		355	1.4	
Turnout		24,883	94.1	
Labor hold		Swing	N/A	

=== Bulla and Dalhousie ===
1937 Victorian state election: Bulla and Dalhousie
Party	Candidate	Votes	%	±%
United Australia	Harry White	4,243	45.4	−0.6
Labor	Charlie Mutton	2,866	30.6	−3.3
Country	John Milligan	2,241	24.0	+3.9
Total formal votes		9,350	98.9	−0.1
Informal votes		102	1.1	+0.1
Turnout		9,452	93.6	−0.8
Two-party-preferred result
United Australia	Harry White	5,262	56.3	−2.6
Labor	Charles Mutton	4,088	43.7	+2.6
United Australia hold		Swing	−2.6	

=== Carlton ===
1937 Victorian state election: Carlton
Party	Candidate	Votes	%	±%
Labor	Bill Barry	unopposed		
Labor hold		Swing		

=== Castlemaine and Kyneton ===
1937 Victorian state election: Castlemaine and Kyneton
Party	Candidate	Votes	%	±%
United Australia	Clive Shields	5,404	51.7	−2.9
Labor	Jessie Satchell	5,051	48.3	+2.9
Total formal votes		10,455	99.4	0.0
Informal votes		59	0.6	0.0
Turnout		10,514	94.4	−1.2
United Australia hold		Swing	−2.9	

=== Caulfield ===
1937 Victorian state election: Caulfield
Party	Candidate	Votes	%	±%
United Australia	Harold Cohen	unopposed		
United Australia hold		Swing		

=== Clifton Hill ===
1937 Victorian state election: Clifton Hill
Party	Candidate	Votes	%	±%
Labor	Bert Cremean	15,113	67.8	+6.3
United Australia	Rhys Davies	7,167	32.2	−6.3
Total formal votes		22,280	98.5	+0.2
Informal votes		340	1.5	−0.2
Turnout		22,620	93.0	−1.4
Labor hold		Swing	+6.3	

=== Coburg ===
1937 Victorian state election: Coburg
Party	Candidate	Votes	%	±%
Labor	Frank Keane	16,218	62.8	+1.6
United Australia	Henry Richards	9,613	37.2	−1.6
Total formal votes		25,831	99.0	+0.7
Informal votes		268	1.0	−0.7
Turnout		26,099	95.2	+1.2
Labor hold		Swing	+1.6	

=== Collingwood ===
1937 Victorian state election: Collingwood
Party	Candidate	Votes	%	±%
Labor	Tom Tunnecliffe	17,286	81.5	+15.3
United Australia	Oliver Dixon	3,915	18.5	−3.4
Total formal votes		21,201	98.2	+1.0
Informal votes		392	1.8	−1.0
Turnout		21,593	92.6	+0.6
Labor hold		Swing	+4.5	

=== Dandenong ===
1937 Victorian state election: Dandenong
Party	Candidate	Votes	%	±%
Labor	Frank Field	14,374	50.6	+8.8
United Australia	Frank Groves	14,064	49.4	−8.8
Total formal votes		28,438	98.7	+0.3
Informal votes		363	1.3	−0.3
Turnout		28,801	94.4	0.0
Labor gain from United Australia		Swing	+8.8	

=== Dundas ===
1937 Victorian state election: Dundas
Party	Candidate	Votes	%	±%
Labor	Bill Slater	unopposed		
Labor hold		Swing		

=== Essendon ===
1937 Victorian state election: Essendon
Party	Candidate	Votes	%	±%
United Australia	James Dillon	12,999	54.7	+2.9
Labor	Arthur Clarey	10,752	45.3	−2.9
Total formal votes		23,751	98.9	−0.3
Informal votes		262	1.1	+0.3
Turnout		24,013	96.7	+0.3
United Australia hold		Swing	+2.9	

=== Evelyn ===
1937 Victorian state election: Evelyn
Party	Candidate	Votes	%	±%
United Australia	William Everard	6,315	58.5	−4.2
Independent	John Jessop	2,613	24.2	+24.2
Country	Thomas Mitchell	1,862	17.3	+17.3
Total formal votes		10,790	98.9	+0.4
Informal votes		119	1.1	−0.4
Turnout		10,909	93.5	+0.3
United Australia hold		Swing	N/A	

- Preferences were not distributed.

=== Flemington ===
1937 Victorian state election: Flemington
Party	Candidate	Votes	%	±%
Labor	Jack Holland	13,953	65.9	−2.8
United Australia	Malcolm Fenton	7,214	34.1	+2.8
Total formal votes		21,167	98.5	+0.3
Informal votes		334	1.5	−0.3
Turnout		21,501	96.1	+2.1
Labor hold		Swing	−2.8	

=== Footscray ===
1937 Victorian state election: Footscray
Party	Candidate	Votes	%	±%
Labor	Jack Mullens	13,857	54.9	−29.4
United Australia	Edward Hanmer	11,371	45.1	+45.1
Total formal votes		25,228	98.7	+2.8
Informal votes		323	1.3	−2.8
Turnout		25,551	96.1	+0.2
Labor hold		Swing	N/A	

=== Geelong ===
1937 Victorian state election: Geelong
Party	Candidate	Votes	%	±%
Labor	William Brownbill	unopposed		
Labor hold		Swing		

=== Gippsland East ===
1937 Victorian state election: Gippsland East
Party	Candidate	Votes	%	±%
Country	Albert Lind	unopposed		
Country hold		Swing		

=== Gippsland North ===
1937 Victorian state election: Gippsland North
Party	Candidate	Votes	%	±%
Independent	James McLachlan	4,038	38.8	−23.6
Country	William Heath	2,239	21.5	−0.9
Independent	Archibald Gilchrist	2,164	20.8	+20.8
Labor	Alexander McAdam	1,977	19.0	+19.0
Total formal votes		10,418	98.9	+0.3
Informal votes		113	1.1	−0.3
Turnout		10,531	94.1	−1.3
Two-candidate-preferred result
Independent	James McLachlan	5,418	52.0	
Country	William Heath	5,000	48.0	
Independent hold		Swing	N/A	

=== Gippsland South ===
1937 Victorian state election: Gippsland South
Party	Candidate	Votes	%	±%
Country	Herbert Hyland	unopposed		
Country hold		Swing		

=== Gippsland West ===
1937 Victorian state election: Gippsland West
Party	Candidate	Votes	%	±%
Country	Matthew Bennett	unopposed		
Country hold		Swing		

=== Goulburn Valley ===
1937 Victorian state election: Goulburn Valley
Party	Candidate	Votes	%	±%
Country	John McDonald	unopposed		
Country hold		Swing		

=== Grant ===
1937 Victorian state election: Grant
Party	Candidate	Votes	%	±%
United Australia	Frederick Holden	unopposed		
United Australia hold		Swing		

=== Gunbower ===
1937 Victorian state election: Gunbower
Party	Candidate	Votes	%	±%
Country	Norman Martin	unopposed		
Country hold		Swing		

=== Hampden ===
1937 Victorian state election: Hampden
Party	Candidate	Votes	%	±%
United Australia	William Cumming	4,516	43.0	+10.1
Labor	Michael Nolan	3,394	32.3	−5.7
Country	Thomas Moore	2,599	24.7	+24.7
Total formal votes		10,509	99.1	+0.2
Informal votes		92	0.9	−0.2
Turnout		10,601	94.9	0.0
Two-party-preferred result
United Australia	William Cumming	6,219	59.1	+1.3
Labor	Michael Nolan	4,290	40.9	−1.3
United Australia hold		Swing	+1.3	

=== Hawthorn ===
1937 Victorian state election: Hawthorn
Party	Candidate	Votes	%	±%
United Australia	John Gray	14,192	60.5	+6.4
Labor	Herbert Oke	9,275	39.5	+39.5
Total formal votes		23,467	98.9	+0.3
Informal votes		267	1.1	−0.3
Turnout		23,734	92.1	−2.4
United Australia hold		Swing	N/A	

=== Heidelberg ===
1937 Victorian state election: Heidelberg
Party	Candidate	Votes	%	±%
United Australia	Henry Zwar	14,666	52.3	−2.5
Labor	Morton Dunlop	13,387	47.7	+2.5
Total formal votes		28,053	99.3	+0.5
Informal votes		209	0.7	−0.5
Turnout		28,262	95.1	−1.2
United Australia hold		Swing	−2.5	

=== Kara Kara and Borung ===
1937 Victorian state election: Kara Kara and Borung
Party	Candidate	Votes	%	±%
Country	Finlay Cameron	6,248	60.4	+32.8
Independent	John Green	4,093	39.6	+22.5
Total formal votes		10,341	99.4	+0.8
Informal votes		145	1.4	−0.8
Turnout		10,405	94.1	−0.6
Country hold		Swing	N/A	

=== Kew ===
1937 Victorian state election: Kew
Party	Candidate	Votes	%	±%
United Australia	Wilfrid Kent Hughes	17,053	68.1	+2.2
Labor	Arthur Kyle	8,002	31.9	−2.2
Total formal votes		25,055	98.8	+0.1
Informal votes		315	1.2	−0.1
Turnout		25,370	92.0	−1.5
United Australia hold		Swing	+2.2	

=== Korong and Eaglehawk ===
1937 Victorian state election: Korong and Eaglehawk
Party	Candidate	Votes	%	±%
Country	Albert Dunstan	8,395	77.5	−22.5
United Australia	Archibald Moses	2,431	22.5	+22.5
Total formal votes		10,826	99.4	
Informal votes		63	0.6	
Turnout		10,889	93.7	
Country hold		Swing	N/A	

=== Lowan ===
1937 Victorian state election: Lowan
Party	Candidate	Votes	%	±%
Country	Hamilton Lamb	7,514	65.8	+10.8
United Australia	Jabez Potts	3,899	34.2	+34.2
Total formal votes		11,413	99.3	−0.2
Informal votes		78	0.7	+0.2
Turnout		11,491	94.4	−0.1
Country hold		Swing	N/A	

=== Maryborough and Daylesford ===
1937 Victorian state election: Maryborough and Daylesford
Party	Candidate	Votes	%	±%
Labor	George Frost	unopposed		
Labor hold		Swing		

=== Melbourne ===
1937 Victorian state election: Melbourne
Party	Candidate	Votes	%	±%
Labor	Tom Hayes	10,902	63.0	−1.5
United Australia	Reginald Archer	6,407	37.0	+1.5
Total formal votes		17,309	97.0	−2.6
Informal votes		537	3.0	+2.6
Turnout		17,846	88.4	−6.9
Labor hold		Swing	−1.5	

=== Mildura ===
1937 Victorian state election: Mildura
Party	Candidate	Votes	%	±%
Country	Albert Allnutt	7,152	59.3	+4.8
Labor	John Egan	4,913	40.7	+40.7
Total formal votes		12,065	98.9	+3.8
Informal votes		133	1.1	−3.8
Turnout		12,198	92.8	+3.0
Country hold		Swing	N/A	

=== Mornington ===
1937 Victorian state election: Mornington
Party	Candidate	Votes	%	±%
United Australia	Alfred Kirton	6,554	53.1	+0.6
Country	George Bowden	5,780	46.9	−0.6
Total formal votes		12,334	99.3	+0.8
Informal votes		86	0.7	−0.8
Turnout		12,420	92.3	−0.6
United Australia hold		Swing	+0.6	

=== Northcote ===
1937 Victorian state election: Northcote
Party	Candidate	Votes	%	±%
Labor	John Cain	16,513	71.4	+3.7
United Australia	Jonas Holt	6,591	28.6	−3.7
Total formal votes		23,104	99.1	+0.7
Informal votes		216	0.9	−0.7
Turnout		23,320	94.8	−0.9
Labor hold		Swing	+3.7	

=== Nunawading ===
1937 Victorian state election: Nunawading
Party	Candidate	Votes	%	±%
United Australia	William Boyland	6,717	29.9	−13.4
Independent	Ivy Weber	5,970	26.6	+26.6
Labor	Arthur Lewis	5,430	24.2	−4.2
Independent	John Mahony	4,335	19.3	+19.3
Total formal votes		22,452	97.4	−1.3
Informal votes		600	2.6	+1.3
Turnout		23,052	94.1	−1.0
Two-candidate-preferred result
Independent	Ivy Weber	12,095	53.8	+53.8
United Australia	William Boyland	10,357	46.1	−15.3
Independent gain from United Australia		Swing	N/A	

=== Oakleigh ===
1937 Victorian state election: Oakleigh
Party	Candidate	Votes	%	±%
Labor	Squire Reid	15,751	52.3	+2.6
United Australia	James Smith	14,340	47.7	−2.6
Total formal votes		30,091	99.2	+0.3
Informal votes		258	0.8	−0.3
Turnout		30,349	93.9	−0.9
Labor gain from United Australia		Swing	+2.6	

=== Ouyen ===
1937 Victorian state election: Ouyen
Party	Candidate	Votes	%	±%
Country	Albert Bussau	unopposed		
Country hold		Swing		

=== Polwarth ===
1937 Victorian state election: Polwarth
Party	Candidate	Votes	%	±%
United Australia	Allan McDonald	6,220	55.8	−44.2
Country	Leonard Parker	4,923	44.2	+44.2
Total formal votes		11,143	99.4	
Informal votes		63	0.6	
Turnout		11,206	95.2	
United Australia hold		Swing	N/A	

=== Port Fairy and Glenelg ===
1937 Victorian state election: Port Fairy and Glenelg
Party	Candidate	Votes	%	±%
Independent Labor	Ernie Bond	8,814	78.0	−22.0
Independent	Robert Roberts	2,487	22.0	+22.0
Total formal votes		11,301	99.4	
Informal votes		71	0.6	
Turnout		11,372	94.8	
Independent Labor hold		Swing	N/A	

=== Port Melbourne ===
1937 Victorian state election: Port Melbourne
Party	Candidate	Votes	%	±%
Labor	James Murphy	15,014	76.2	+2.4
Independent	Mary Jones	4,703	23.8	−2.4
Total formal votes		19,717	98.2	+0.9
Informal votes		354	1.8	−0.9
Turnout		20,071	93.8	+0.9
Labor hold		Swing	+2.4	

=== Prahran ===
1937 Victorian state election: Prahran
Party	Candidate	Votes	%	±%
United Australia	John Ellis	13,243	55.5	−1.9
Labor	Archibald Fraser	10,599	44.5	+1.9
Total formal votes		23,842	98.9	+0.3
Informal votes		259	1.1	−0.3
Turnout		24,101	94.2	+0.6
United Australia hold		Swing	−1.9	

=== Richmond ===
1937 Victorian state election: Richmond
Party	Candidate	Votes	%	±%
Labor	Ted Cotter	15,996	69.8	−2.8
Independent	Cecil Lee-Archer	6,908	30.2	+30.2
Total formal votes		22,904	98.4	+0.8
Informal votes		384	1.6	−0.8
Turnout		23,288	92.7	−1.8
Labor hold		Swing	−2.8	

=== Rodney ===
1937 Victorian state election: Rodney
Party	Candidate	Votes	%	±%
Country	William Dunstone	unopposed		
Country hold		Swing		

=== St Kilda ===
1937 Victorian state election: St Kilda
Party	Candidate	Votes	%	±%
United Australia	Archie Michaelis	17,559	66.7	+12.1
Labor	Marks Feinberg	8,783	33.3	+33.3
Total formal votes		26,342	98.2	+0.3
Informal votes		476	1.8	−0.3
Turnout		26,818	92.5	−3.8
United Australia hold		Swing	N/A	

=== Stawell and Ararat ===
1937 Victorian state election: Stawell and Ararat
Party	Candidate	Votes	%	±%
Country	Alec McDonald	unopposed		
Country hold		Swing		

=== Swan Hill ===
1937 Victorian state election: Swan Hill
Party	Candidate	Votes	%	±%
Country	Francis Old	5,540	64.2	+21.6
Country	Percy Byrnes	2,246	26.0	+26.0
United Australia	Alfred Jager	842	9.8	+9.8
Total formal votes		8,628	98.6	+0.4
Informal votes		126	1.4	−0.4
Turnout		8,754	93.1	+1.1
Country hold		Swing	N/A	

- Preferences were not distributed.

=== Toorak ===
1937 Victorian state election: Toorak
Party	Candidate	Votes	%	±%
United Australia	Stanley Argyle	15,110	67.5	−32.5
Labor	Frederick Botsman	7,278	32.5	+32.5
Total formal votes		22,388	98.3	
Informal votes		399	1.7	
Turnout		22,787	91.6	
United Australia hold		Swing	N/A	

=== Upper Goulburn ===
1937 Victorian state election: Upper Goulburn
Party	Candidate	Votes	%	±%
Country	Edwin Mackrell	unopposed		
Country hold		Swing		

=== Upper Yarra ===
1937 Victorian state election: Upper Yarra
Party	Candidate	Votes	%	±%
United Australia	George Knox	unopposed		
United Australia hold		Swing		

=== Walhalla ===
1937 Victorian state election: Walhalla
Party	Candidate	Votes	%	±%
Country	William Moncur	4,937	46.9	−12.1
Independent Labor	Arthur Fewster	3,029	28.8	+28.8
Independent Country	Daniel White	1,437	13.7	−27.3
United Australia	Claude Lewis	1,120	10.6	+10.6
Total formal votes		10,523	97.9	−0.1
Informal votes		227	2.1	+0.1
Turnout		10,750	93.8	−1.3
After distribution of preferences
Country	William Moncur	5,435	51.6	
Independent Labor	Arthur Fewster	3,164	30.1	
Independent Country	Daniel White	1,924	18.3	
Country hold		Swing	N/A	

- Preferences were not distributed to completion.

=== Wangaratta and Ovens ===
1937 Victorian state election: Wangaratta and Ovens
Party	Candidate	Votes	%	±%
Country	Lot Diffey	unopposed		
Country hold		Swing		

=== Waranga ===
1937 Victorian state election: Waranga
Party	Candidate	Votes	%	±%
Country	Ernest Coyle	unopposed		
Country hold		Swing		

=== Warrenheip and Grenville ===
1937 Victorian state election: Warrenheip and Grenville
Party	Candidate	Votes	%	±%
Country	Edmond Hogan	5,560	56.1	+56.1
United Australia	Fred Edmunds	4,356	43.9	+43.9
Total formal votes		9,916	97.6	−0.5
Informal votes		244	2.4	+0.5
Turnout		10,160	95.5	+0.7
Country gain from Independent		Swing	N/A	

=== Warrnambool ===
1937 Victorian state election: Warrnambool
Party	Candidate	Votes	%	±%
Country	Henry Bailey	6,795	58.0	+18.0
United Australia	Keith McGarvie	4,928	42.0	+5.9
Total formal votes		11,723	99.3	0.0
Informal votes		82	0.7	0.0
Turnout		11,805	95.9	+0.6
Country hold		Swing	+0.6	

=== Williamstown ===
1937 Victorian state election: Williamstown
Party	Candidate	Votes	%	±%
Labor	John Lemmon	13,534	61.0	−39.0
United Australia	James Gray	8,660	39.0	+39.0
Total formal votes		22,194	99.0	
Informal votes		233	1.0	
Turnout		22,427	96.0	
Labor hold		Swing	N/A	

=== Wonthaggi ===
1937 Victorian state election: Wonthaggi
Party	Candidate	Votes	%	±%
Labor	William McKenzie	8,334	89.6	+31.3
Communist	Alfred Watt	963	10.4	+2.4
Total formal votes		9,297	98.9	−0.1
Informal votes		101	1.1	+0.1
Turnout		9,398	93.7	−1.8
Labor hold		Swing	N/A	

== See also ==
- 1937 Victorian state election
- Candidates of the 1937 Victorian state election
- Members of the Victorian Legislative Assembly, 1937–1940
