= Results of the 1935 Victorian state election (Legislative Assembly) =

Australian state election results

Victorian state election, 2 March 1935 Legislative Assembly << 1932–1937 >>
Enrolled voters	904,191				
Votes cast	853,470		Turnout	94.39	+0.19
Informal votes	14,150		Informal	1.65	+0.24
Summary of votes by party
Party	Primary votes	%	Swing	Seats	Change
Labor	318,390	37.93	+2.79	17	+1
United Australia	303,626	36.17	−3.95	25	−4
United Country	115,064	13.71	+1.38	20	+3
Communist	9,301	1.11	+0.97	0	±0
Independent	92,939	11.08	+1.37	3	±0
Total	839,320			65	

This is a list of electoral district results for the Victorian 1935 election.

== Results by electoral district ==
=== Albert Park ===
1935 Victorian state election: Albert Park
Party	Candidate	Votes	%	±%
United Australia	Harry Drew	11,167	53.4	−10.6
Labor	John Chapple	8,500	40.6	+4.6
Independent	George Brown	1,247	6.0	+6.0
Total formal votes		20,914	97.4	−0.9
Informal votes		564	2.6	+0.9
Turnout		21,478	93.1	+2.0
Two-party-preferred result
United Australia	Harry Drew		55.9	−8.1
Labor	John Chapple		44.1	+8.1
United Australia hold		Swing	−8.1	

- Two party preferred vote was estimated.

=== Allandale ===
1935 Victorian state election: Allandale
Party	Candidate	Votes	%	±%
Labor	Patrick Denigan	4,187	42.1	+42.1
United Australia	Thomas Parkin	3,135	31.5	−69.5
Country	Ord Glen	2,633	26.4	+26.4
Total formal votes		9,955	98.8	
Informal votes		125	1.2	
Turnout		10,080	96.4	
Two-party-preferred result
United Australia	Thomas Parkin	5,116	51.4	−48.6
Labor	Patrick Denigan	4,839	48.6	+48.6
United Australia hold		Swing	N/A	

=== Ballarat ===
1935 Victorian state election: Ballarat
Party	Candidate	Votes	%	±%
United Australia	Thomas Hollway	9,856	55.6	−1.1
Labor	William McAdam	7,646	44.4	+1.1
Total formal votes		17,232	99.3	+0.2
Informal votes		122	0.7	−0.2
Turnout		17,354	95.2	−0.9
United Australia hold		Swing	−1.1	

=== Barwon ===
1935 Victorian state election: Barwon
Party	Candidate	Votes	%	±%
United Australia	Thomas Maltby	6,573	56.1	−43.9
Independent	Thomas Ellis	2,701	23.1	+23.1
Labor	Sydney Gerson	2,438	20.8	+20.8
Total formal votes		11,712	98.6	
Informal votes		165	1.4	
Turnout		11,877	94.9	
United Australia hold		Swing	N/A	

- Preferences were not distributed.

=== Benalla ===
1935 Victorian state election: Benalla
Party	Candidate	Votes	%	±%
Country	Edward Clearly	unopposed		
Country hold		Swing		

=== Benambra ===
1935 Victorian state election: Benambra
Party	Candidate	Votes	%	±%
Country	Roy Paton	4,397	52.8	+52.8
United Australia	Tom Mitchell	3,928	47.2	−52.8
Total formal votes		8,325	98.4	
Informal votes		133	1.6	
Turnout		8,458	93.7	
Country hold		Swing	N/A	

=== Bendigo ===
1935 Victorian state election: Bendigo
Party	Candidate	Votes	%	±%
Labor	Arthur Cook	10,457	61.7	+10.1
United Australia	Albert Staples	6,502	38.3	+12.3
Total formal votes		16,959	99.2	+0.3
Informal votes		135	0.8	−0.3
Turnout		17,094	95.1	−0.4
Labor hold		Swing	+7.9	

=== Boroondara ===
1935 Victorian state election: Boroondara
Party	Candidate	Votes	%	±%
United Australia	Trevor Oldham	unopposed		
United Australia hold		Swing		

=== Brighton ===
1935 Victorian state election: Brighton
Party	Candidate	Votes	%	±%
United Australia	Ian Macfarlan	12,786	51.1	−48.9
Independent	Edmund Herring	12,258	48.9	+48.9
Total formal votes		25,044	98.4	
Informal votes		398	1.6	
Turnout		25,442	95.0	
United Australia hold		Swing	N/A	

=== Brunswick ===
1935 Victorian state election: Brunswick
Party	Candidate	Votes	%	±%
Labor	James Jewell	unopposed		
Labor hold		Swing		

=== Bulla and Dalhousie ===
1935 Victorian state election: Bulla and Dalhousie
Party	Candidate	Votes	%	±%
United Australia	Harry White	4,353	46.0	+15.1
Labor	Charlie Mutton	3,206	33.9	−8.2
Country	John Ryan	1,905	20.1	−7.0
Total formal votes		9,464	99.0	0.0
Informal votes		93	1.0	0.0
Turnout		9,557	94.4	+1.6
Two-party-preferred result
United Australia	Harry White	5,573	58.9	+4.6
Labor	Charlie Mutton	3,891	41.1	−4.6
United Australia hold		Swing	+4.6	

=== Carlton ===
1935 Victorian state election: Carlton
Party	Candidate	Votes	%	±%
Labor	Bill Barry	11,397	60.3	−1.7
United Australia	Francis Nelson	5,166	27.2	−10.7
Communist	Gerald O'Day	2,340	12.4	+12.4
Total formal votes		18,903	96.8	−0.4
Informal votes		629	3.2	+0.4
Turnout		19,532	91.9	+0.6
Two-party-preferred result
Labor	Bill Barry		71.5	+9.5
United Australia	Francis Nelson		29.5	−9.5
Labor hold		Swing	+9.5	

- Two party preferred vote was estimated.

=== Castlemaine and Kyneton ===
1935 Victorian state election: Castlemaine and Kyneton
Party	Candidate	Votes	%	±%
United Australia	Clive Shields	5,620	54.6	+2.2
Labor	Reg Pollard	4,665	45.4	−2.2
Total formal votes		10,285	99.4	+0.3
Informal votes		64	0.6	−0.3
Turnout		10,349	95.6	−0.5
United Australia hold		Swing	+2.2	

=== Caulfield ===
1935 Victorian state election: Caulfield
Party	Candidate	Votes	%	±%
United Australia	Harold Cohen	13,098	54.9	−20.3
Independent	Edgar Morton	10,772	45.1	+45.1
Total formal votes		23,870	97.7	−1.3
Informal votes		561	2.3	+1.3
Turnout		24,431	95.6	+1.3
United Australia hold		Swing	N/A	

=== Clifton Hill ===
1935 Victorian state election: Clifton Hill
Party	Candidate	Votes	%	±%
Labor	Herbert Cremean	13,636	61.5	+13.1
United Australia	Harold Holt	8,531	38.5	+0.7
Total formal votes		22,167	98.3	+0.2
Informal votes		379	1.7	−0.2
Turnout		22,546	94.4	+1.9
Labor hold		Swing	+7.7	

=== Coburg ===
1935 Victorian state election: Coburg
Party	Candidate	Votes	%	±%
Labor	Frank Keane	14,633	61.2	+8.4
United Australia	Henry Stubbs	9,294	38.8	+3.4
Total formal votes		23,927	98.4	+0.9
Informal votes		384	1.6	−0.9
Turnout		24,311	94.0	−1.9
Labor hold		Swing	+4.9	

=== Collingwood ===
1935 Victorian state election: Collingwood
Party	Candidate	Votes	%	±%
Labor	Tom Tunnecliffe	13,806	66.2	−33.8
United Australia	Robert Breen	4,562	21.9	+21.9
Communist	Ernie Thornton	2,501	12.0	+12.0
Total formal votes		20,869	97.2	
Informal votes		602	2.8	
Turnout		21,471	92.0	
Two-party-preferred result
Labor	Tom Tunnecliffe		77.0	−23.0
United Australia	Robert Breen		23.0	+23.0
Labor hold		Swing	N/A	

- Two party preferred vote was estimated.

=== Dandenong ===
1935 Victorian state election: Dandenong
Party	Candidate	Votes	%	±%
United Australia	Frank Groves	15,104	58.2	−1.0
Labor	Edward Stewart	10,862	41.8	+1.0
Total formal votes		25,966	98.4	−0.6
Informal votes		430	1.6	+0.6
Turnout		26,396	94.4	+0.3
United Australia hold		Swing	−1.0	

=== Dundas ===
1935 Victorian state election: Dundas
Party	Candidate	Votes	%	±%
Labor	Bill Slater	6,462	58.7	+8.6
United Australia	Athol Cooper	4,541	41.3	−8.6
Total formal votes		11,003	99.4	0.0
Informal votes		62	99.4	0.0
Turnout		11,065	95.4	−0.5
Labor hold		Swing	+8.6	

=== Essendon ===
1935 Victorian state election: Essendon
Party	Candidate	Votes	%	±%
United Australia	James Dillon	11,746	51.8	−1.1
Labor	Alan Bird	10,921	48.2	+1.1
Total formal votes		22,667	99.2	+0.1
Informal votes		193	0.8	−0.1
Turnout		22,860	96.4	0.0
United Australia hold		Swing	−1.1	

=== Evelyn ===
1935 Victorian state election: Evelyn
Party	Candidate	Votes	%	±%
United Australia	William Everard	6,531	62.7	+3.3
Independent	George Mott	2,378	22.8	+22.8
Independent	John Wood	1,513	14.5	+14.5
Total formal votes		10,422	98.5	+0.2
Informal votes		157	1.5	−0.2
Turnout		10,579	93.2	+0.9
United Australia hold		Swing	N/A	

- Preferences were not distributed.

=== Flemington ===
1935 Victorian state election: Flemington
Party	Candidate	Votes	%	±%
Labor	Jack Holland	14,131	68.7	+9.1
United Australia	Douglas Knight	6,423	31.3	+5.9
Total formal votes		20,554	98.2	+0.2
Informal votes		381	1.8	−0.2
Turnout		20,935	94.0	−1.1
Labor hold		Swing	+1.1	

=== Footscray ===
1935 Victorian state election: Footscray
Party	Candidate	Votes	%	±%
Labor	George Prendergast	19,684	84.3	+22.0
Communist	Alfred Watt	3,674	15.7	+15.7
Total formal votes		23,358	95.9	−2.1
Informal votes		1,006	4.1	+2.1
Turnout		24,364	95.9	−0.8
Labor hold		Swing	N/A	

=== Geelong ===
1935 Victorian state election: Geelong
Party	Candidate	Votes	%	±%
Labor	William Brownbill	9,567	54.1	+10.5
United Australia	Edward Austin	8,112	45.9	+13.2
Total formal votes		17,679	99.1	+0.3
Informal votes		157	0.9	−0.3
Turnout		17,836	95.6	+0.3
Labor gain from United Australia		Swing	+6.0	

=== Gippsland East ===
1935 Victorian state election: Gippsland East
Party	Candidate	Votes	%	±%
Country	Albert Lind	5,494	73.6	−26.4
Labor	Arnold Holst	1,968	26.4	+26.4
Total formal votes		7,462	99.3	
Informal votes		50	0.7	
Turnout		7,512	93.9	
Country hold		Swing	N/A	

=== Gippsland North ===
1935 Victorian state election: Gippsland North
Party	Candidate	Votes	%	±%
Independent	James McLachlan	6,416	62.4	+3.8
Country	William Kelly	2,304	22.4	−0.2
United Australia	Stephen Ashton	1,563	15.2	−3.6
Total formal votes		10,283	98.6	−0.5
Informal votes		144	1.4	+0.5
Turnout		10,427	95.4	+1.3
Independent hold		Swing	N/A	

- Preferences were not distributed.

=== Gippsland South ===
1935 Victorian state election: Gippsland South
Party	Candidate	Votes	%	±%
Country	Herbert Hyland	unopposed		
Country hold		Swing		

=== Gippsland West ===
1935 Victorian state election: Gippsland West
Party	Candidate	Votes	%	±%
Country	Matthew Bennett	7,861	74.2	−25.8
Independent	George Burhop	2,739	25.8	+25.8
Total formal votes		10,600	98.3	
Informal votes		183	1.7	
Turnout		10,783	94.4	
Country hold		Swing	N/A	

=== Goulburn Valley ===
1935 Victorian state election: Goulburn Valley
Party	Candidate	Votes	%	±%
Country	Murray Bourchier	unopposed		
Country hold		Swing		

=== Grant ===
1935 Victorian state election: Grant
Party	Candidate	Votes	%	±%
United Australia	Frederick Holden	5,657	60.1	+22.4
Labor	Ralph Hjorth	3,755	39.9	+3.0
Total formal votes		9,412	99.0	0.0
Informal votes		100	1.0	0.0
Turnout		9,512	93.2	+0.1
United Australia hold		Swing	+1.3	

=== Gunbower ===
1935 Victorian state election: Gunbower
Party	Candidate	Votes	%	±%
Country	Norman Martin	unopposed		
Country hold		Swing		

=== Hampden ===
1935 Victorian state election: Hampden
Party	Candidate	Votes	%	±%
Labor	Harry McCorkell	3,977	38.0	+38.0
United Australia	William Cumming	3,439	32.9	−67.1
United Australia	Roderick McRae	3,042	29.1	+29.1
Total formal votes		10,458	98.9	
Informal votes		113	1.1	
Turnout		10,571	94.9	
Two-party-preferred result
United Australia	William Cumming	6,045	57.8	−42.2
Labor	Harry McCorkell	4,413	42.2	+42.2
United Australia hold		Swing	N/A	

=== Hawthorn ===
1935 Victorian state election: Hawthorn
Party	Candidate	Votes	%	±%
United Australia	John Gray	12,076	54.1	−45.9
Social Credit	Leslie Hollins	10,229	45.9	+45.9
Total formal votes		22,305	98.6	
Informal votes		325	1.4	
Turnout		22,630	94.5	
United Australia hold		Swing	N/A	

=== Heidelberg ===
1935 Victorian state election: Heidelberg
Party	Candidate	Votes	%	±%
United Australia	Henry Zwar	14,577	54.8	+9.8
Labor	Gordon Webber	12,021	45.2	+3.8
Total formal votes		26,598	98.8	+0.6
Informal votes		318	1.2	−0.6
Turnout		26,916	96.3	+2.7
United Australia hold		Swing	−0.2	

=== Kara Kara and Borung ===
1935 Victorian state election: Kara Kara and Borung
Party	Candidate	Votes	%	±%
United Australia	John Pennington	4,187	40.3	−33.2
Country	Finlay Cameron	2,867	27.6	+27.6
Independent	John Green	1,777	17.1	+17.1
Country	William Pearse	1,560	15.0	+15.0
Total formal votes		10,391	98.6	−0.9
Informal votes		145	1.4	+0.9
Turnout		10,536	94.7	−1.3
Two-candidate-preferred result
Country	Finlay Cameron	5,455	52.5	+52.5
United Australia	John Pennington	4,936	47.5	−26.0
Country gain from United Australia		Swing	N/A	

=== Kew ===
1935 Victorian state election: Kew
Party	Candidate	Votes	%	±%
United Australia	Wilfrid Kent Hughes	15,641	65.9	−11.4
Labor	Thomas Botsman	8,090	34.1	+11.4
Total formal votes		23,731	98.7	−0.2
Informal votes		305	1.3	+0.2
Turnout		24,036	93.5	+1.4
United Australia hold		Swing	−11.4	

=== Korong and Eaglehawk ===
1935 Victorian state election: Korong and Eaglehawk
Party	Candidate	Votes	%	±%
Country	Albert Dunstan	unopposed		
Country hold		Swing		

=== Lowan ===
1935 Victorian state election: Lowan
Party	Candidate	Votes	%	±%
Country	Hamilton Lamb	6,173	55.0	+55.0
Country	Marcus Wettenhall	5,043	45.0	−17.3
Total formal votes		11,216	99.5	+1.4
Informal votes		57	0.5	−1.4
Turnout		11,273	94.5	−2.1
Country hold		Swing	N/A	

=== Maryborough and Daylesford ===
1935 Victorian state election: Maryborough and Daylesford
Party	Candidate	Votes	%	±%
Labor	George Frost	6,237	57.4	+6.7
United Australia	Stanley Bevan	2,419	22.3	−27.0
Country	Henry Bromfield	2,201	20.3	+20.3
Total formal votes		10,857	99.6	0.0
Informal votes		48	0.4	0.0
Turnout		10,905	95.3	−1.2
Two-party-preferred result
Labor	George Frost		59.4	+8.7
United Australia	Stanley Bevan		40.6	−8.7
Labor hold		Swing	+8.7	

- Two party preferred vote was estimated.

=== Melbourne ===
1935 Victorian state election: Melbourne
Party	Candidate	Votes	%	±%
Labor	Tom Hayes	11,320	64.5	+9.4
United Australia	Charles Lucas	6,239	35.5	−3.7
Total formal votes		17,559	96.7	−0.6
Informal votes		600	3.3	+0.6
Turnout		18,159	87.5	−2.8
Labor hold		Swing	+4.3	

=== Mildura ===
1935 Victorian state election: Mildura
Party	Candidate	Votes	%	±%
Country	Albert Allnutt	6,027	54.5	−3.1
Independent	William Ellison	1,682	15.2	+15.2
Country	James Lochhead	1,274	11.5	+11.5
Country	James Power	1,070	9.7	+9.7
Country	George Hardie	1,006	9.1	+9.1
Total formal votes		11,059	95.1	−3.2
Informal votes		566	4.9	+3.2
Turnout		11,625	89.8	+2.6
Country hold		Swing	N/A	

- Preferences were not distributed.

=== Mornington ===
1935 Victorian state election: Mornington
Party	Candidate	Votes	%	±%
United Australia	Alfred Kirton	6,361	52.5	+1.1
Country	George Bowden	5,758	47.5	+10.7
Total formal votes		12,119	98.5	−0.3
Informal votes		179	1.5	+0.3
Turnout		12,298	92.9	+2.1
United Australia hold		Swing	−4.8	

=== Northcote ===
1935 Victorian state election: Northcote
Party	Candidate	Votes	%	±%
Labor	John Cain	15,108	67.7	+8.2
United Australia	Fred Edmunds	7,191	32.3	−8.2
Total formal votes		22,299	98.4	−0.5
Informal votes		362	1.6	+0.5
Turnout		22,661	95.7	+2.1
Labor hold		Swing	+8.2	

=== Nunawading ===
1935 Victorian state election: Nunawading
Party	Candidate	Votes	%	±%
United Australia	William Boyland	9,277	43.3	−56.7
Labor	Arthur Lewis	6,078	28.4	+28.4
Independent	Edmund Greenwood	6,043	28.2	+28.2
Total formal votes		21,398	98.7	
Informal votes		282	1.3	
Turnout		21,680	95.1	
Two-party-preferred result
United Australia	William Boyland	13,133	61.4	−38.6
Labor	Arthur Lewis	8,265	38.6	+38.6
United Australia hold		Swing	N/A	

=== Oakleigh ===
1935 Victorian state election: Oakleigh
Party	Candidate	Votes	%	±%
United Australia	James Vinton Smith	13,978	50.3	+23.9
Labor	Squire Reid	13,813	49.7	+9.4
Total formal votes		27,791	98.9	0.0
Informal votes		272	1.1	0.0
Turnout		28,063	94.8	+0.2
United Australia gain from Independent		Swing	N/A	

=== Ouyen ===
1935 Victorian state election: Ouyen
Party	Candidate	Votes	%	±%
Country	Albert Bussau	7,289	72.2	+20.0
Labor	Wilhelm Kruse	2,804	27.8	+27.8
Total formal votes		10,093	99.2	0.0
Informal votes		81	0.8	0.0
Turnout		10,174	92.0	−1.8
Country hold		Swing	N/A	

=== Polwarth ===
1935 Victorian state election: Polwarth
Party	Candidate	Votes	%	±%
United Australia	Allan McDonald	unopposed		
United Australia hold		Swing		

=== Port Fairy and Glenelg ===
1935 Victorian state election: Port Fairy and Glenelg
Party	Candidate	Votes	%	±%
Independent	Ernie Bond	unopposed		
Independent hold		Swing		

=== Port Melbourne ===
1935 Victorian state election: Port Melbourne
Party	Candidate	Votes	%	±%
Labor	James Murphy	14,844	73.8	−26.2
Independent	Mary Jones	5,258	26.2	+26.2
Total formal votes		20,102	97.3	
Informal votes		567	2.7	
Turnout		20,669	92.9	
Labor hold		Swing	N/A	

=== Prahran ===
1935 Victorian state election: Prahran
Party	Candidate	Votes	%	±%
United Australia	John Ellis	13,478	57.4	−2.1
Labor	Archibald Fraser	10,016	42.6	+20.4
Total formal votes		23,494	98.6	+0.9
Informal votes		331	1.4	−0.9
Turnout		23,825	93.6	+2.3
United Australia hold		Swing	−6.7	

=== Richmond ===
1935 Victorian state election: Richmond
Party	Candidate	Votes	%	±%
Labor	Ted Cotter	16,268	72.6	−27.4
United Australia	Cecil Lee-Archer	6,147	27.4	+27.4
Total formal votes		22,415	97.6	
Informal votes		560	2.4	
Turnout		22,975	94.5	
Labor hold		Swing	N/A	

=== Rodney ===
1935 Victorian state election: Rodney
Party	Candidate	Votes	%	±%
Country	John Allan	5,618	49.6	−50.4
Country	Samuel Lancaster	2,642	23.3	+23.3
Country	Edward Sullivan	1,916	16.9	+16.9
Country	Thomas Roddis	1,147	10.1	+10.1
Total formal votes		11,323	98.7	
Informal votes		144	1.3	
Turnout		11,467	95.6	
Country hold		Swing	N/A	

- Preferences were not distributed.

=== St Kilda ===
1935 Victorian state election: St Kilda
Party	Candidate	Votes	%	±%
United Australia	Archie Michaelis	13,582	54.6	−1.3
Independent	Cyril Nelson	11,317	45.4	+45.4
Total formal votes		24,899	97.9	−1.1
Informal votes		546	2.1	+1.1
Turnout		25,445	96.3	+1.5
United Australia hold		Swing	−1.3	

=== Stawell and Ararat ===
1935 Victorian state election: Stawell and Ararat
Party	Candidate	Votes	%	±%
Labor	Morton Dunlop	4,631	41.2	+41.2
Country	Alec McDonald	4,160	37.0	−12.2
United Australia	Thomas Austin	2,456	21.8	−29.0
Total formal votes		11,247	99.0	+0.4
Informal votes		112	1.0	−0.4
Turnout		11,359	96.5	+0.8
Two-party-preferred result
Country	Alec McDonald	6,224	55.3	+6.1
Labor	Morton Dunlop	5,023	44.7	+44.7
Country gain from United Australia		Swing	N/A	

=== Swan Hill ===
1935 Victorian state election: Swan Hill
Party	Candidate	Votes	%	±%
Country	Francis Old	3,765	42.6	−12.5
Independent	Cyril Judd	2,631	29.8	+29.8
Independent	Robert Roberts	1,237	14.0	+14.0
Independent	William Sullivan	1,196	13.6	+13.6
Total formal votes		8,829	98.2	−0.6
Informal votes		164	1.8	+0.6
Turnout		8,993	92.0	−1.1
Two-candidate-preferred result
Country	Francis Old	4,496	50.9	−8.7
Independent	Cyril Judd	4,333	49.1	+49.1
Country hold		Swing	N/A	

=== Toorak ===
1935 Victorian state election: Toorak
Party	Candidate	Votes	%	±%
United Australia	Stanley Argyle	unopposed		
United Australia hold		Swing		

=== Upper Goulburn ===
1935 Victorian state election: Upper Goulburn
Party	Candidate	Votes	%	±%
Country	Edwin Mackrell	5,620	61.8	+15.9
Labor	Edward Withers	3,476	38.2	+5.5
Total formal votes		9,096	99.2	+0.4
Informal votes		75	0.8	−0.4
Turnout		9,171	94.4	+0.5
Country hold		Swing	−3.0	

=== Upper Yarra ===
1935 Victorian state election: Upper Yarra
Party	Candidate	Votes	%	±%
United Australia	George Knox	unopposed		
United Australia hold		Swing		

=== Walhalla ===
1935 Victorian state election: Walhalla
Party	Candidate	Votes	%	±%
Country	William Moncur	5,925	59.0	−0.1
Independent	Daniel White	4,113	41.0	+25.1
Total formal votes		10,038	98.0	−1.0
Informal votes		208	2.0	+1.0
Turnout		10,246	95.1	+2.7
Country hold		Swing	N/A	

=== Wangaratta and Ovens ===
1935 Victorian state election: Wangaratta and Ovens
Party	Candidate	Votes	%	±%
Country	Lot Diffey	5,601	53.6	−46.4
Labor	Paul Jones	4,853	46.4	+46.4
Total formal votes		10,454	99.1	
Informal votes		93	0.9	
Turnout		10,547	94.1	
Country hold		Swing	N/A	

=== Waranga ===
1935 Victorian state election: Waranga
Party	Candidate	Votes	%	±%
Country	Ernest Coyle	5,824	64.4	+21.2
Independent	William Cochrane	1,854	20.5	+20.5
United Australia	David Thomas	1,370	15.1	−41.7
Total formal votes		9,048	98.9	+0.1
Informal votes		100	1.1	−0.1
Turnout		9,148	95.5	+1.1
Country gain from United Australia		Swing	N/A	

- Coyle was elected as a UAP member for Waranga in the 1932 election, but joined the Country party in 1933.

=== Warrenheip and Grenville ===
1935 Victorian state election: Warrenheip and Grenville
Party	Candidate	Votes	%	±%
Independent Labor	Edmond Hogan	5,578	55.9	−44.1
Labor	Ernest Kent	4,404	44.1	+44.1
Total formal votes		9,982	98.1	
Informal votes		195	1.9	
Turnout		10,177	94.8	
Independent Labor hold		Swing		

=== Warrnambool ===
1935 Victorian state election: Warrnambool
Party	Candidate	Votes	%	±%
Country	Henry Bailey	4,649	40.0	+40.0
United Australia	Keith McGarvie	4,188	36.1	−19.0
Labor	Frederick Gill	2,775	23.9	+23.9
Total formal votes		11,612	99.3	−0.1
Informal votes		81	0.7	+0.1
Turnout		11,693	96.5	0.0
Two-party-preferred result
Country	Henry Bailey	6,671	57.4	+57.4
United Australia	Keith McGarvie	4,941	42.6	−12.5
Country gain from United Australia		Swing	N/A	

=== Williamstown ===
1935 Victorian state election: Williamstown
Party	Candidate	Votes	%	±%
Labor	John Lemmon	unopposed		
Labor hold		Swing		

=== Wonthaggi ===
1935 Victorian state election: Wonthaggi
Party	Candidate	Votes	%	±%
Labor	William McKenzie	5,754	58.3	+6.2
Country	Francis Minchin	3,335	33.8	−5.5
Communist	Ralph Gibson	786	8.0	+8.0
Total formal votes		9,875	99.0	−0.1
Informal votes		104	1.0	+0.1
Turnout		9,979	95.5	+0.7
Two-party-preferred result
Labor	William McKenzie		64.6	+10.6
Country	Francis Minchin		35.4	−10.6
Labor hold		Swing	+10.6	

- Two party preferred vote was estimated.

== See also ==
- 1935 Victorian state election
- Candidates of the 1935 Victorian state election
- Members of the Victorian Legislative Assembly, 1935–1937
