= Candidates of the 1935 Victorian state election =

The 1935 Victorian state election was held on 2 March 1935.

== Retiring Members ==
=== United Australia ===
- Sir Harold Luxton MLA (Caulfield)
- Chester Manifold MLA (Hampden)
- Millie, Lady Peacock MLA (Allandale)
- Richard Toutcher MLA (Stawell and Ararat)

== Legislative Assembly ==
Sitting members are shown in bold text. Successful candidates are highlighted in the relevant colour. Where there is possible confusion, an asterisk (*) is also used.

| Electorate | Held by | Labor candidates | UAP candidates | Country candidates | Other candidates |
|---|---|---|---|---|---|
| Albert Park | UAP | John Chapple | **Harry Drew** | | George Brown (Ind) |
| Allandale | UAP | Patrick Denigan | Thomas Parkin | Ord Glen | |
| Ballarat | UAP | William McAdam | **Thomas Hollway** | | |
| Barwon | UAP | Sydney Gerson | **Thomas Maltby** | | Thomas Ellis (Ind) |
| Benalla | Country | | | **Edward Cleary** | |
| Benambra | Country | | Tom Mitchell | **Roy Paton** | |
| Bendigo | Labor | **Arthur Cook** | Albert Staples | | |
| Boroondara | UAP | | **Trevor Oldham** | | |
| Brighton | UAP | | **Ian Macfarlan** | | Edmund Herring (Ind) |
| Brunswick | Labor | **James Jewell** | | | |
| Bulla and Dalhousie | UAP | Charlie Mutton | **Harry White** | John Ryan | |
| Carlton | Labor | **Bill Barry** | Francis Nelson | | Gerald O'Day (CPA) |
| Castlemaine and Kyneton | UAP | Reg Pollard | **Clive Shields** | | |
| Caulfield | UAP | | Harold Cohen | | Edgar Morton (Ind) |
| Clifton Hill | Labor | **Bert Cremean** | Harold Holt | | |
| Coburg | Labor | **Frank Keane** | Henry Stubbs | | |
| Collingwood | Labor | **Tom Tunnecliffe** | Robert Breen | | Ernie Thornton (CPA) |
| Dandenong | UAP | Edward Stewart | **Frank Groves** | | |
| Dundas | Labor | **Bill Slater** | Athol Cooper | | |
| Essendon | UAP | Alan Bird | **James Dillon** | | |
| Evelyn | UAP | | **William Everard** | | George Mott (Ind); John Wood (Ind) |
| Flemington | Labor | **Jack Holland** | Douglas Knight | | |
| Footscray | Labor | **George Prendergast** | | | Alfred Watt (CPA) |
| Geelong | UAP | William Brownbill | **Edward Austin** | | |
| Gippsland East | Country | Arnold Holst | | **Albert Lind** | |
| Gippsland North | Independent | | Stephen Ashton | William Kelly | **James McLachlan** (Ind) |
| Gippsland South | Country | | | **Herbert Hyland** | |
| Gippsland West | Country | | | **Matthew Bennett** | George Burhop (Ind) |
| Goulburn Valley | Country | | | **Murray Bourchier** | |
| Grant | UAP | Ralph Hjorth | **Frederick Holden** | | |
| Gunbower | Country | | | **Norman Martin** | |
| Hampden | UAP | Harry McCorkell | William Cumming*; Roderick McRae | | |
| Hawthorn | UAP | | **John Gray** | | Leslie Hollins (SC) |
| Heidelberg | UAP | Gordon Webber | **Henry Zwar** | | |
| Kara Kara and Borung | UAP | | **John Pennington** | Finlay Cameron*; William Pearse | John Green (Ind) |
| Kew | UAP | Thomas Botsman | **Wilfrid Kent Hughes** | | |
| Korong and Eaglehawk | Country | | | **Albert Dunstan** | |
| Lowan | Country | | | Hamilton Lamb*; **Marcus Wettenhall** | |
| Maryborough and Daylesford | Labor | **George Frost** | Stanley Bevan | Henry Bromfield | |
| Melbourne | Labor | **Tom Hayes** | Charles Lucas | | |
| Mildura | Country | | | **Albert Allnutt***; George Hardie; James Lochhead; James Power | William Ellison (Ind) |
| Mornington | UAP | | **Alfred Kirton** | George Bowden | |
| Northcote | Labor | **John Cain** | Fred Edmunds | | |
| Nunawading | UAP | Arthur Lewis | **William Boyland** | | Edmund Greenwood (Ind) |
| Oakleigh | Independent | Squire Reid | **James Vinton Smith** | | |
| Ouyen | Country | Wilhelm Kruse | | **Albert Bussau** | |
| Polwarth | UAP | | **Allan McDonald** | | |
| Port Fairy and Glenelg | Independent | | | | **Ernie Bond** (Ind) |
| Port Melbourne | Labor | **James Murphy** | | | Mary Jones (Ind) |
| Prahran | UAP | Archibald Fraser | **John Ellis** | | |
| Richmond | Labor | **Ted Cotter** | Cecil Lee-Archer | | |
| Rodney | Country | | | **John Allan***; Samuel Lancaster; Thomas Roddis; Edward Sullivan | |
| St Kilda | UAP | | **Archie Michaelis** | | Cyril Nelson (Ind) |
| Stawell and Ararat | UAP | Morton Dunlop | Thomas Austin | Alec McDonald | |
| Swan Hill | Country | | | **Francis Old** | Cyril Judd (Ind); Robert Roberts (Ind); William Sullivan (Ind) |
| Toorak | UAP | | **Sir Stanley Argyle** | | |
| Upper Goulburn | Country | Edward Withers | | **Edwin Mackrell** | |
| Upper Yarra | UAP | | **George Knox** | | |
| Walhalla | Country | | | **William Moncur** | Daniel White (Ind) |
| Wangaratta and Ovens | Country | Paul Jones | | **Lot Diffey** | |
| Waranga | UAP | | David Thomas | **Ernest Coyle** | William Cochrane (Ind) |
| Warrenheip and Grenville | Independent | Ernest Kent | | | **Edmond Hogan** (Ind Lab) |
| Warrnambool | UAP | Frederick Gill | **Keith McGarvie** | Henry Bailey | |
| Williamstown | Labor | **John Lemmon** | | | |
| Wonthaggi | Labor | **William McKenzie** | Francis Minchin | | Ralph Gibson (CPA) |

== See also ==
- 1934 Victorian Legislative Council election
