= Candidates of the 1937 Victorian state election =

The 1937 Victorian state election was held on 2 October 1937.

== Retiring members ==
George Prendergast (Labor, Footscray) died shortly before the election. No by-election was held.

No members retired at this election.

== Legislative Assembly ==
Sitting members are shown in bold text. Successful candidates are highlighted in the relevant colour. Where there is possible confusion, an asterisk (*) is also used.

Electorate	Held by	Labor candidates	UAP candidates	Country candidates	Other candidates
Albert Park	UAP	John Chapple	William Haworth		**Harry Drew** (Ind UAP); Leah Kloot (Ind)
Allandale	Labor	**Patrick Denigan**	Edward Montgomery	Russell White	
Ballarat	UAP	Arthur Loft	**Thomas Hollway**		
Barwon	UAP		**Thomas Maltby**	Warwick Cayley	
Benalla	Independent	Jack Devlin		Mervyn Huggins	**Frederick Cook** (Ind)
Benambra	Country		Tom Mitchell	**Roy Paton**	
Bendigo	Labor	**Arthur Cook**			
Boroondara	UAP		**Trevor Oldham**		
Brighton	UAP		**Ian Macfarlan**		Gerald O'Day (CPA)
Brunswick	Labor	**James Jewell**	Charles Hartley		
Bulla and Dalhousie	UAP	Charlie Mutton	**Harry White**	John Milligan	
Carlton	Labor	**Bill Barry**			
Castlemaine and Kyneton	UAP	Jessie Satchell	**Clive Shields**		
Caulfield	UAP		**Harold Cohen**		
Clifton Hill	Labor	**Bert Cremean**	Rhys Davies		
Coburg	Labor	**Frank Keane**	Henry Richards		
Collingwood	Labor	**Tom Tunnecliffe**	Oliver Dixon		
Dandenong	UAP	Frank Field	**Frank Groves**		
Dundas	Labor	**Bill Slater**			
Essendon	UAP	Arthur Clarey	**James Dillon**		
Evelyn	UAP		**William Everard**	Thomas Mitchell	John Jessop (Ind)
Flemington	Labor	**Jack Holland**	Malcolm Fenton		
Footscray	Labor	Jack Mullens	Edward Hanmer		
Geelong	Labor	**William Brownbill**			
Gippsland East	Country			**Albert Lind**	
Gippsland North	Independent	Alexander McAdam		William Heath	Archibald Gilchrist (Ind); **James McLachlan*** (Ind)
Gippsland South	Country			**Herbert Hyland**	
Gippsland West	Country			**Matthew Bennett**	
Goulburn Valley	Country			**John McDonald**	
Grant	UAP		**Frederick Holden**		
Gunbower	Country			**Norman Martin**	
Hampden	UAP	Michael Nolan	**William Cumming**	Thomas Moore	
Hawthorn	UAP	Herbert Oke	**John Gray**		
Heidelberg	UAP	Morton Dunlop	**Henry Zwar**		
Kara Kara and Borung	Country			**Finlay Cameron**	John Green (Ind)
Kew	UAP	Arthur Kyle	**Wilfrid Kent Hughes**		
Korong and Eaglehawk	Country		Archibald Moses	**Albert Dunstan**	
Lowan	Country		Jabez Potts	**Hamilton Lamb**	
Maryborough and Daylesford	Labor	**George Frost**			
Melbourne	Labor	**Tom Hayes**	Reginald Archer		
Mildura	Country	John Egan		**Albert Allnutt**	
Mornington	UAP		**Alfred Kirton**	George Bowden	
Northcote	Labor	**John Cain**	Jonas Holt		
Nunawading	UAP	Arthur Lewis	**William Boyland**		John Mahony (Ind); Ivy Weber* (Ind)
Oakleigh	UAP	Squire Reid	**James Vinton Smith**		
Ouyen	Country			**Albert Bussau**	
Polwarth	UAP		**Allan McDonald**	Leonard Parker	
Port Fairy and Glenelg	Independent				**Ernie Bond*** (Ind Lab); Robert Roberts (Ind)
Port Melbourne	Labor	**James Murphy**			Mary Jones (Ind)
Prahran	UAP	Archibald Fraser	**John Ellis**		
Richmond	Labor	**Ted Cotter**			Cecil Lee-Archer (Ind)
Rodney	Country			**William Dunstone**	
St Kilda	UAP	Marks Feinberg	**Archie Michaelis**		
Stawell and Ararat	Country			**Alec McDonald**	
Swan Hill	Country	Alfred Jager		Percy Byrnes; **Francis Old***	
Toorak	UAP	Frederick Botsman	**Sir Stanley Argyle**		
Upper Goulburn	Country			**Edwin Mackrell**	
Upper Yarra	UAP		**George Knox**		
Walhalla	Country		Claude Lewis	**William Moncur**	Arthur Fewster (Ind Lab); Daniel White (Ind CP)
Wangaratta and Ovens	Country			**Lot Diffey**	
Waranga	Country			**Ernest Coyle**	
Warrenheip and Grenville	Country		Fred Edmunds	**Edmond Hogan**	
Warrnambool	Country		Keith McGarvie	**Henry Bailey**	
Williamstown	Labor	**John Lemmon**	James Gray		
Wonthaggi	Labor	**William McKenzie**			Alfred Watt (CPA)

== See also ==
- 1937 Victorian Legislative Council election
