= Electoral results for the district of Allandale =

Australian district election results

This is a list of electoral results for the electoral district of Allandale in Victorian state elections.

== Members for Allandale ==
Member	Party	Term
Alexander Peacock	Ministerial	1904–1911
Alexander Peacock	Fusion Liberal	1911–1916
Alexander Peacock	Nationalist	1916–1931
Alexander Peacock	United Australia	1931–1933
Millie Peacock	United Australia	1933–1935
Thomas Parkin	United Australia	1935–1936
Patrick Denigan	Labor	1936–1945
Russell White	Country	1945–1955

== Election results ==
=== Elections in the 1950s ===
1952 Victorian state election: Allandale
Party	Candidate	Votes	%	±%
Country	Russell White	7,620	51.1	+17.0
Labor	Patrick Denigan	7,277	48.9	+5.8
Total formal votes		14,897	98.8	−0.5
Informal votes		183	1.2	+0.5
Turnout		15,080	94.7	−1.0
Country hold		Swing	−4.2	

1950 Victorian state election: Allandale
Party	Candidate	Votes	%	±%
Labor	Stanley Glover	6,274	43.1	+1.8
Country	Russell White	4,973	34.2	−7.1
Liberal and Country	Thomas Grigg	3,314	22.8	+4.4
Total formal votes		14,561	99.3	−0.1
Informal votes		109	0.7	+0.1
Turnout		14,670	95.7	+0.3
Two-party-preferred result
Country	Russell White	8,058	55.3	−1.5
Labor	Stanley Glover	6,503	44.7	+1.5
Country hold		Swing	−1.5	

=== Elections in the 1940s ===
1947 Victorian state election: Allandale
Party	Candidate	Votes	%	±%
Country	Russell White	5,911	41.3	+10.6
Labor	Thomas Powell	4,771	40.3	−8.2
Liberal	Hector Alcock	2,640	18.4	−2.4
Total formal votes		14,322	99.4	+0.3
Informal votes		79	0.6	−0.3
Turnout		14,401	95.4	+5.2
Two-party-preferred result
Country	Russell White	8,142	56.8	+6.5
Labor	Thomas Powell	6,180	43.2	−6.5
Country hold		Swing	+6.5	

1945 Victorian state election: Allandale
Party	Candidate	Votes	%	±%
Labor	Patrick Denigan	6,257	48.5	
Country	Russell White	3,965	30.7	
Liberal	Albert Woodward	2,692	20.8	
Total formal votes		12,914	99.1	
Informal votes		117	0.9	
Turnout		13,031	90.2	
Two-party-preferred result
Country	Russell White	6,498	50.3	
Labor	Patrick Denigan	6,416	49.7	
Country gain from Labor		Swing		

1943 Victorian state election: Allandale
Party	Candidate	Votes	%	±%
Labor	Patrick Denigan	4,051	48.2	−10.8
Country	Arthur Boustead	2,394	28.5	+0.5
United Australia	Allen Driscoll	1,967	23.4	+23.4
Total formal votes		8,412	99.4	+0.5
Informal votes		50	0.6	−0.5
Turnout		8,462	89.2	−6.1
Two-party-preferred result
Labor	Patrick Denigan	4,317	51.3	
Country	Arthur Boustead	4,095	48.7	
Labor hold		Swing	N/A	

1940 Victorian state election: Allandale
Party	Candidate	Votes	%	±%
Labor	Patrick Denigan	5,533	59.0	+11.2
Country	Albert Hocking	2,624	28.0	+0.7
Liberal Country	William Chapman	1,218	13.0	+13.0
Total formal votes		9,375	98.9	−0.2
Informal votes		109	1.1	+0.2
Turnout		9,484	95.3	−0.8
Two-party-preferred result
Labor	Patrick Denigan		61.2	
Country	Albert Hocking		38.8	
Labor hold		Swing	+10.6	

- Two party preferred vote was estimated.

=== Elections in the 1930s ===
1937 Victorian state election: Allandale
Party	Candidate	Votes	%	±%
Labor	Patrick Denigan	4,661	47.8	+5.7
Country	Russell White	2,664	27.3	+0.9
United Australia	Edward Montgomery	2,434	24.9	−6.6
Total formal votes		9,759	99.1	+0.3
Informal votes		86	0.9	−0.3
Turnout		9,845	96.1	−0.3
Two-party-preferred result
Labor	Patrick Denigan	4,925	50.6	+2.0
Country	Russell White	4,834	49.4	+49.4
Labor gain from United Australia		Swing	+2.0	

1936 Allandale state by-election
Party	Candidate	Votes	%	±%
Labor	Patrick Denigan	3,780	39.3	−2.8
United Australia	David Baird	3,105	32.2	+0.8
Country	Ord Glen	2,737	28.4	+2.0
Total formal votes		9,622	99.1	+0.3
Informal votes		86	0.9	−0.3
Turnout		9,708	94.0	−2.4
Two-party-preferred result
Labor	Patrick Denigan	4,971	51.7	+3.1
United Australia	David Baird	4,651	48.3	−3.1
Labor gain from United Australia		Swing	+3.1	

1935 Victorian state election: Allandale
Party	Candidate	Votes	%	±%
Labor	Patrick Denigan	4,187	42.1	+42.1
United Australia	Thomas Parkin	3,135	31.5	−69.5
Country	Ord Glen	2,633	26.4	+26.4
Total formal votes		9,955	98.8	
Informal votes		125	1.2	
Turnout		10,080	96.4	
Two-party-preferred result
United Australia	Thomas Parkin	5,116	51.4	−48.6
Labor	Patrick Denigan	4,839	48.6	+48.6
United Australia hold		Swing	N/A	

1933 Allandale state by-election
Party	Candidate	Votes	%	±%
United Australia	Millie Peacock	5,370	58.5	
Labor	William McAdam	3,807	41.5	
Total formal votes		9,177	99.2	
Informal votes		76	0.8	
Turnout		9,253	91.2	
United Australia hold		Swing	N/A	

1932 Victorian state election: Allandale
Party	Candidate	Votes	%	±%
United Australia	Alexander Peacock	unopposed		
United Australia hold		Swing		

=== Elections in the 1920s ===
1929 Victorian state election: Allandale
Party	Candidate	Votes	%	±%
Nationalist	Alexander Peacock	unopposed		
Nationalist hold		Swing		

1927 Victorian state election: Allandale
Party	Candidate	Votes	%	±%
Nationalist	Alexander Peacock	5,053	56.2	
Labor	William McGrath	3,938	43.8	
Total formal votes		8,991	97.0	
Informal votes		275	3.0	
Turnout		9,266	95.4	
Nationalist hold		Swing		

1924 Victorian state election: Allandale
Party	Candidate	Votes	%	±%
Nationalist	Alexander Peacock	unopposed		
Nationalist hold		Swing		

1921 Victorian state election: Allandale
Party	Candidate	Votes	%	±%
Nationalist	Alexander Peacock	2,538	72.1	−27.9
Labor	Robert Miller	984	27.9	+27.9
Total formal votes		3,522	99.4	
Informal votes		23	0.6	
Turnout		3,545	64.8	
Nationalist hold		Swing	N/A	

1920 Victorian state election: Allandale
Party	Candidate	Votes	%	±%
Nationalist	Alexander Peacock	unopposed		
Nationalist hold		Swing		

=== Elections in the 1910s ===
1917 Victorian state election: Allandale
Party	Candidate	Votes	%	±%
Nationalist	Alexander Peacock	2,444	74.0	
Nationalist	Walter Grose	859	26.0	
Total formal votes		3,303	97.6	
Informal votes		83	2.4	
Turnout		3,386	59.2	
Nationalist hold		Swing	N/A	

1914 Victorian state election: Allandale
Party	Candidate	Votes	%	±%
Liberal	Alexander Peacock	unopposed		
Liberal hold		Swing		

1911 Victorian state election: Allandale
Party	Candidate	Votes	%	±%
Liberal	Alexander Peacock	3,762	78.4	N/A
Labor	Walter Miller	1,035	21.6	+21.6
Total formal votes		4,627	98.4	
Informal votes		79	1.6	
Turnout		4,706	72.7	
Liberal hold		Swing	N/A	
