= Electoral results for the district of Gunbower =

Victoria, Australia, district election results

This is a list of electoral results for the electoral district of Gunbower in Victorian state elections.

== Members for Gunbower ==
Member	Party	Term
James McColl		1889–1901
John Cullen	Ministerialist	1901–1911
Henry Angus	Fusion Liberal	1911–1916
Henry Angus	Nationalist	1916–1931
Henry Angus	United Australia	1931–1934
Norman Martin	Country	1934–1945

== Election results ==
=== Elections in the 1940s ===
1943 Victorian state election: Gunbower
Party	Candidate	Votes	%	±%
Country	Norman Martin	unopposed		
Country hold		Swing		

1940 Victorian state election: Gunbower
Party	Candidate	Votes	%	±%
Country	Norman Martin	unopposed		
Country hold		Swing		

=== Elections in the 1930s ===
1937 Victorian state election: Gunbower
Party	Candidate	Votes	%	±%
Country	Norman Martin	unopposed		
Country hold		Swing		

1935 Victorian state election: Gunbower
Party	Candidate	Votes	%	±%
Country	Norman Martin	unopposed		
Country hold		Swing		

1934 Gunbower state by-election
Party	Candidate	Votes	%	±%
Independent Country	Norman Martin	5,655	54.5	+54.5
Country	James Matheson	4,728	45.5	+2.0
Total formal votes		10,448	99.7	+0.6
Informal votes		31	0.3	−0.6
Turnout		10,479	95.3	0.0
Independent Country gain from United Australia		Swing	N/A	

- Norman Martin joined the Country Party upon being elected to parliament.

1932 Victorian state election: Gunbower
Party	Candidate	Votes	%	±%
United Australia	Henry Angus	5,864	56.5	−8.6
Country	James Matheson	4,522	43.5	+8.6
Total formal votes		10,386	99.1	−0.3
Informal votes		93	0.9	+0.3
Turnout		10,479	95.3	+2.6
United Australia hold		Swing	−8.6	

=== Elections in the 1920s ===
1929 Victorian state election: Gunbower
Party	Candidate	Votes	%	±%
Nationalist	Henry Angus	6,627	65.1	+65.1
Country Progressive	Edward McNicol	3,555	34.9	−3.7
Total formal votes		10,182	99.4	+0.6
Informal votes		58	0.6	−0.6
Turnout		10,240	92.7	+2.2
Nationalist gain from Ind. Nationalist		Swing	N/A	

1927 Victorian state election: Gunbower
Party	Candidate	Votes	%	±%
Independent	Henry Angus	5,889	61.4	
Country Progressive	Farquhar Matheson	3,696	38.6	
Total formal votes		9,585	98.8	
Informal votes		118	1.2	
Turnout		9,703	90.5	
Independent gain from Australian Liberal		Swing		

1924 Victorian state election: Gunbower
Party	Candidate	Votes	%	±%
Australian Liberal	Henry Angus	3,289	55.2	+55.2
Country	William McCann	2,664	44.8	+1.2
Total formal votes		5,953	98.9	−0.5
Informal votes		64	1.1	+0.5
Turnout		6,017	65.6	−3.7
Australian Liberal gain from Nationalist		Swing	N/A	

- Henry Angus was the sitting Nationalist MP for Gunbower.

1921 Victorian state election: Gunbower
Party	Candidate	Votes	%	±%
Nationalist	Henry Angus	3,479	56.4	−2.1
Victorian Farmers	Ogilvie Watson	2,692	43.6	+2.1
Total formal votes		6,171	99.4	+2.9
Informal votes		38	0.6	−2.9
Turnout		6,209	69.3	−3.8
Nationalist hold		Swing	−2.1	

1920 Victorian state election: Gunbower
Party	Candidate	Votes	%	±%
Nationalist	Henry Angus	3,708	58.5	
Victorian Farmers	William McCann	2,625	41.5	+41.5
Total formal votes		6,333	96.5	
Informal votes		231	3.5	
Turnout		6,564	73.1	
Nationalist hold		Swing	N/A	

=== Elections in the 1910s ===
1917 Victorian state election: Gunbower
Party	Candidate	Votes	%	±%
Nationalist	Henry Angus	unopposed		
Nationalist hold		Swing		

1914 Victorian state election: Gunbower
Party	Candidate	Votes	%	±%
Liberal	Henry Angus	unopposed		
Liberal hold		Swing		

1911 Victorian state election: Gunbower
Party	Candidate	Votes	%	±%
Liberal	Henry Angus	2,883	51.0	+51.0
Liberal	John Cullen	2,771	49.0	N/A
Total formal votes		5,654	97.0	
Informal votes		178	3.0	
Turnout		5,832	74.3	
Liberal hold		Swing	N/A	
