= Electoral results for the district of Nunawading =

Victoria, Australia, district election results

This is a list of electoral results for the electoral district of Nunawading in Victorian state elections.

== Members for Nunawading ==
| Member | Party | Term |
|---|---|---|
| Edmund Greenwood | Nationalist | 1927–1929 |
| Robert Menzies | Nationalist | 1929–1931 |
| Robert Menzies | United Australia | 1931–1934 |
| William Boyland | United Australia | 1934–1937 |
| Ivy Weber | Independent | 1937–1943 |
| Bob Gray | Labor | 1943–1945 |

== Election results ==
=== Elections in the 1940s ===
1943 Nunawading state by-election
| Party | Candidate | Votes | % | ±% |
|---|---|---|---|---|
| Labor | Bob Gray | 11,021 | 43.9 | +7.0 |
| United Australia | Oliver Norman | 4,580 | 18.3 | −5.4 |
| Ind. United Australia | John Hogan | 3,162 | 12.6 | −11.1 |
| Independent | Fred Edmunds | 2,315 | 9.2 | +9.2 |
| Independent | Claude Robertson | 1,763 | 7.0 | +7.0 |
| Independent | Lila Monsbourgh | 1,526 | 6.1 | +6.1 |
| Independent | Walter Fordham | 709 | 2.8 | +2.8 |
| Total formal votes | | 25,167 | 97.3 | +0.4 |
| Informal votes | | 707 | 2.7 | −0.4 |
| Turnout | | 25,874 | 84.0 | −4.0 |
After distribution of preferences
| Labor | Bob Gray | 12,736 | 50.6 | |
| United Australia | Oliver Norman | 6,371 | 25.3 | |
| Ind. United Australia | John Hogan | 5,960 | 23.7 | |
| Labor gain from Independent | | Swing | N/A | |

- Preferences were not fully distributed.

1943 Victorian state election: Nunawading
| Party | Candidate | Votes | % | ±% |
|---|---|---|---|---|
| Labor | Bob Gray | 9,498 | 36.9 | +7.4 |
| Independent | Ivy Weber | 8,665 | 33.7 | −0.9 |
| United Australia | John Hogan | 6,085 | 23.7 | −8.0 |
| Independent | Clifford Wolfe | 1,480 | 5.8 | +5.8 |
| Total formal votes | | 25,728 | 96.9 | −1.1 |
| Informal votes | | 813 | 3.1 | +1.1 |
| Turnout | | 26,541 | 88.0 | −5.5 |
Two-candidate-preferred result
| Independent | Ivy Weber | 14,492 | 56.3 | +0.2 |
| Labor | Bob Gray | 11,236 | 43.7 | +43.7 |
| Independent hold | | Swing | N/A | |

1940 Victorian state election: Nunawading
| Party | Candidate | Votes | % | ±% |
|---|---|---|---|---|
| United Australia | William Dimmick | 8,591 | 35.7 | +5.8 |
| Independent | Ivy Weber | 8,368 | 34.8 | +8.2 |
| Labor | Thomas Brennan | 7,097 | 29.5 | +5.7 |
| Total formal votes | | 24,056 | 98.0 | +0.6 |
| Informal votes | | 492 | 2.0 | −0.6 |
| Turnout | | 24,548 | 93.5 | −0.6 |
Two-candidate-preferred result
| Independent | Ivy Weber | 13,505 | 56.1 | +2.3 |
| United Australia | William Dimmick | 10,551 | 43.9 | −2.3 |
| Independent hold | | Swing | +2.3 | |

=== Elections in the 1930s ===
1937 Victorian state election: Nunawading
| Party | Candidate | Votes | % | ±% |
|---|---|---|---|---|
| United Australia | William Boyland | 6,717 | 29.9 | −13.4 |
| Independent | Ivy Weber | 5,970 | 26.6 | +26.6 |
| Labor | Arthur Lewis | 5,430 | 24.2 | −4.2 |
| Independent | John Mahony | 4,335 | 19.3 | +19.3 |
| Total formal votes | | 22,452 | 97.4 | −1.3 |
| Informal votes | | 600 | 2.6 | +1.3 |
| Turnout | | 23,052 | 94.1 | −1.0 |
Two-candidate-preferred result
| Independent | Ivy Weber | 12,095 | 53.8 | +53.8 |
| United Australia | William Boyland | 10,357 | 46.1 | −15.3 |
| Independent gain from United Australia | | Swing | N/A | |

1935 Victorian state election: Nunawading
| Party | Candidate | Votes | % | ±% |
|---|---|---|---|---|
| United Australia | William Boyland | 9,277 | 43.3 | −56.7 |
| Labor | Arthur Lewis | 6,078 | 28.4 | +28.4 |
| Independent | Edmund Greenwood | 6,043 | 28.2 | +28.2 |
| Total formal votes | | 21,398 | 98.7 | |
| Informal votes | | 282 | 1.3 | |
| Turnout | | 21,680 | 95.1 | |
Two-party-preferred result
| United Australia | William Boyland | 13,133 | 61.4 | −38.6 |
| Labor | Arthur Lewis | 8,265 | 38.6 | +38.6 |
| United Australia hold | | Swing | N/A | |

1934 Nunawading state by-election
| Party | Candidate | Votes | % | ±% |
|---|---|---|---|---|
| United Australia | David Robertson | 4,882 | 25.0 | |
| Labor | Fred Katz | 4,761 | 24.3 | |
| United Australia | William Boyland | 4,447 | 22.7 | |
| United Australia | Edmund Greenwood | 3,261 | 16.7 | |
| United Australia | George Reid | 2,203 | 11.3 | |
| Total formal votes | | 19,554 | 95.9 | |
| Informal votes | | 843 | 4.1 | |
| Turnout | | 20,397 | 90.5 | |
Two-candidate-preferred result
| United Australia | William Boyland | 10,189 | 52.1 | |
| United Australia | David Robertson | 9,365 | 47.9 | |
| United Australia hold | | Swing | N/A | |

1932 Victorian state election: Nunawading
| Party | Candidate | Votes | % | ±% |
|---|---|---|---|---|
| United Australia | Robert Menzies | unopposed | | |
| United Australia hold | | Swing | | |

=== Elections in the 1920s ===
1929 Victorian state election: Nunawading
| Party | Candidate | Votes | % | ±% |
|---|---|---|---|---|
| Nationalist | Robert Menzies | 10,932 | 55.4 | −0.8 |
| Labor | John McKellar | 8,793 | 44.6 | +10.7 |
| Total formal votes | | 19,725 | 99.2 | +1.5 |
| Informal votes | | 151 | 0.8 | −1.5 |
| Turnout | | 19,876 | 94.5 | +1.4 |
| Nationalist hold | | Swing | −3.7 | |

1927 Victorian state election: Nunawading
| Party | Candidate | Votes | % | ±% |
|---|---|---|---|---|
| Nationalist | Edmund Greenwood | 8,044 | 46.5 | |
| Labor | John Toohey | 5,866 | 33.9 | |
| Nationalist | Garnet Soilleux | 1,674 | 9.7 | |
| Australian Liberal | Stephen Thompson | 1,095 | 6.3 | |
| Australian Liberal | Robert Halliday | 602 | 3.5 | |
| Total formal votes | | 17,281 | 97.7 | |
| Informal votes | | 410 | 2.3 | |
| Turnout | | 17,691 | 93.1 | |
Two-party-preferred result
| Nationalist | Edmund Greenwood | 10,209 | 59.1 | |
| Labor | John Toohey | 7,072 | 40.9 | |
| Nationalist hold | | Swing | | |
