= Electoral results for the district of Stawell and Ararat =

Victoria, Australia, district election results

This is a list of electoral results for the electoral district of Stawell and Ararat in Victorian state elections.

== Members for Stawell and Ararat ==
Member	Party	Term
Richard Toutcher	Comm. Liberal	1904–1935
Alec McDonald	Country	1935–1945

== Election results ==
=== Elections in the 1940s ===
1943 Victorian state election: Stawell and Ararat
Party	Candidate	Votes	%	±%
Country	Alec McDonald	5,155	52.0	−2.1
Labor	Ernie Morton	4,763	48.0	+2.1
Total formal votes		9,918	99.4	+0.3
Informal votes		60	0.6	−0.3
Turnout		9,978	89.3	−5.4
Country hold		Swing	−2.1	

1940 Victorian state election: Stawell and Ararat
Party	Candidate	Votes	%	±%
Country	Alec McDonald	5,970	54.1	−45.9
Labor	Stanley Freeland	5,067	45.9	+45.9
Total formal votes		11,037	99.1	
Informal votes		102	0.9	
Turnout		11,139	94.7	
Country hold		Swing	N/A	

=== Elections in the 1930s ===
1937 Victorian state election: Stawell and Ararat
Party	Candidate	Votes	%	±%
Country	Alec McDonald	unopposed		
Country hold		Swing		

1935 Victorian state election: Stawell and Ararat
Party	Candidate	Votes	%	±%
Labor	Morton Dunlop	4,631	41.2	+41.2
Country	Alec McDonald	4,160	37.0	−12.2
United Australia	Thomas Austin	2,456	21.8	−29.0
Total formal votes		11,247	99.0	+0.4
Informal votes		112	1.0	−0.4
Turnout		11,359	96.5	+0.8
Two-party-preferred result
Country	Alec McDonald	6,224	55.3	+6.1
Labor	Morton Dunlop	5,023	44.7	+44.7
Country gain from United Australia		Swing	N/A	

1932 Victorian state election: Stawell and Ararat
Party	Candidate	Votes	%	±%
United Australia	Richard Toutcher	5,404	50.8	−1.2
Country	Alec McDonald	5,238	49.2	+49.2
Total formal votes		10,642	98.6	−0.6
Informal votes		155	1.4	+0.6
Turnout		10,797	95.7	+0.8
United Australia hold		Swing	N/A	

=== Elections in the 1920s ===
1929 Victorian state election: Stawell and Ararat
Party	Candidate	Votes	%	±%
Nationalist	Richard Toutcher	5,415	52.0	−3.8
Labor	Frank Brophy	5,006	48.0	+3.8
Total formal votes		10,421	99.2	+1.3
Informal votes		84	0.8	−1.3
Turnout		10,505	94.9	+2.1
Nationalist hold		Swing	−3.8	

1927 Victorian state election: Stawell and Ararat
Party	Candidate	Votes	%	±%
Nationalist	Richard Toutcher	5,520	55.8	
Labor	Robert McCracken	4,366	44.2	
Total formal votes		9,886	97.9	
Informal votes		209	2.1	
Turnout		10,095	92.8	
Nationalist hold		Swing		

1924 Victorian state election: Stawell and Ararat
Party	Candidate	Votes	%	±%
Nationalist	Richard Toutcher	3,331	56.8	−0.4
Labor	Francis Brophy	2,533	43.2	+0.4
Total formal votes		5,864	99.6	+0.1
Informal votes		21	0.4	−0.1
Turnout		5,885	74.4	+5.7
Nationalist hold		Swing	−0.4	

1921 Victorian state election: Stawell and Ararat
Party	Candidate	Votes	%	±%
Nationalist	Richard Toutcher	3,115	57.2	−4.2
Labor	Francis Brophy	2,333	42.8	+4.2
Total formal votes		5,448	99.5	+5.4
Informal votes		30	0.5	−5.4
Turnout		5,478	68.7	+1.2
Nationalist hold		Swing	−4.2	

1920 Victorian state election: Stawell and Ararat
Party	Candidate	Votes	%	±%
Nationalist	Richard Toutcher	3,135	61.4	+3.3
Labor	Francis Brophy	1,968	38.6	−3.3
Total formal votes		5,103	94.1	−2.8
Informal votes		323	5.9	+2.8
Turnout		5,426	67.5	+8.1
Nationalist hold		Swing	+3.3	

=== Elections in the 1910s ===
1917 Victorian state election: Stawell and Ararat
Party	Candidate	Votes	%	±%
Nationalist	Richard Toutcher	3,029	58.1	+2.7
Labor	William Tibbles	2,182	41.9	−2.7
Total formal votes		5,211	96.9	−1.2
Informal votes		165	3.1	+1.2
Turnout		5,376	59.4	−3.6
Nationalist hold		Swing	+2.7	

1914 Victorian state election: Stawell and Ararat
Party	Candidate	Votes	%	±%
Liberal	Richard Toutcher	3,124	55.4	−3.8
Labor	William Tibbles	2,520	44.6	+3.8
Total formal votes		5,644	98.1	−1.0
Informal votes		110	1.9	+1.0
Turnout		5,754	63.0	−12.8
Liberal hold		Swing	−3.8	

1911 Victorian state election: Stawell and Ararat
Party	Candidate	Votes	%	±%
Liberal	Richard Toutcher	3,598	59.2	+14.6
Labor	William Sewell	2,484	40.8	+8.1
Total formal votes		6,084	99.1	−0.5
Informal votes		54	0.9	+0.5
Turnout		6,138	75.8	+12.0
Liberal hold		Swing	N/A	
