= Electoral results for the district of Ballarat North =

Australian district election results

This is a list of electoral results for the electoral district of Ballarat North in Victorian state elections.

== Members for Ballarat North ==
Member	Party	Term
Russell White	Country	1955-1960
Tom Evans	Liberal and Country	1960-1965
Tom Evans	Liberal	1965-1988
Steve Elder	Liberal	1988-1992

== Election results ==
=== Elections in the 1980s ===
1988 Victorian state election: Ballarat North
Party	Candidate	Votes	%	±%
Liberal	Steve Elder	14,183	47.50	−9.63
Labor	Steve Bracks	13,123	43.95	+1.08
National	Geoffrey Mark	1,903	6.37	+6.37
Independent	J. Blanchard	653	2.19	+2.19
Total formal votes		29,862	98.21	
Informal votes		544	1.79	
Turnout		30,406	94.45	
Two-party-preferred result
Liberal	Steve Elder	15,921	53.55	−3.58
Labor	Steve Bracks	13,810	46.45	+3.58
Liberal hold		Swing	−3.58	

1988 Ballarat North state by-election
Party	Candidate	Votes	%	±%
Liberal	Steve Elder	12,831	46.25	−10.88
Labor	Steve Bracks	11,513	41.50	−1.37
National	Geoffrey Mark	3,396	12.24	+12.24
Total formal votes		27,740	98.29	
Informal votes		483	1.71	
Turnout		28,223	89.86	
Two-party-preferred result
Liberal	Steve Elder	15,715	56.65	−0.48
Labor	Steve Bracks	12,025	43.35	+0.48
Liberal hold		Swing	−0.48	

1985 Victorian state election: Ballarat North
Party	Candidate	Votes	%	±%
Liberal	Tom Evans	16,497	57.1	+5.0
Labor	Steve Bracks	12,377	42.9	−0.5
Total formal votes		28,874	98.2	
Informal votes		518	1.8	
Turnout		29,392	94.5	
Liberal hold		Swing	+3.2	

1982 Victorian state election: Ballarat North
Party	Candidate	Votes	%	±%
Liberal	Tom Evans	13,873	52.93	−3.39
Labor	Bill Horrocks	11,107	42.38	−1.30
Democrats	W.A. Ross	1,231	4.70	+4.70
Total formal votes		26,211	98.56	+0.92
Informal votes		383	1.44	−0.92
Turnout		26,594	94.25	−0.60
Two-party-preferred result
Liberal	Tom Evans	14,396	54.92	−1.40
Labor	Bill Horrocks	11,815	45.08	+1.40
Liberal hold		Swing	−1.40	

=== Elections in the 1970s ===
1979 Victorian state election: Ballarat North
Party	Candidate	Votes	%	±%
Liberal	Tom Evans	14,324	56.32	−0.47
Labor	Bill Horrocks	11,108	43.68	+6.14
Total formal votes		25,432	97.64	−0.67
Informal votes		616	2.36	+0.67
Turnout		26,048	94.85	−0.46
Liberal hold		Swing	−5.57	

1976 Victorian state election: Ballarat North
Party	Candidate	Votes	%	±%
Liberal	Tom Evans	13,702	56.8	+4.1
Labor	Jeremy Harper	9,057	37.5	−1.5
Democratic Labor	Dennis O'Reilly	1,369	5.7	−2.3
Total formal votes		24,128	98.3	
Informal votes		416	1.7	
Turnout		24,544	95.3	
Two-party-preferred result
Liberal	Tom Evans	14,934	61.9	+1.9
Labor	Jeremy Harper	9,194	38.1	−1.9
Liberal hold		Swing	+1.9	

1973 Victorian state election: Ballarat North
Party	Candidate	Votes	%	±%
Liberal	Tom Evans	13,631	53.84	+4.34
Labor	Jim Caddy	9,513	37.58	+2.56
Democratic Labor	Moya Schaefer	2,171	8.58	−6.90
Total formal votes		25,315	98.08	+0.01
Informal votes		495	1.92	−0.01
Turnout		25,810	95.09	−1.05
Two-party-preferred result
Liberal	Tom Evans	15,477	61.14	−2.70
Labor	Jim Caddy	9,838	38.86	+2.70
Liberal hold		Swing	−2.70	

1970 Victorian state election: Ballarat North
Party	Candidate	Votes	%	±%
Liberal	Tom Evans	11,266	49.50	−0.59
Labor	Kevin Flynn	7,971	35.02	+2.09
Democratic Labor	Walter Brown	3,522	15.48	−0.60
Total formal votes		22,759	98.07	−0.03
Informal votes		447	1.93	+0.03
Turnout		23,206	96.14	−0.54
Two-party-preferred result
Liberal	Tom Evans	14,350	63.84	−0.69
Labor	Kevin Flynn	8,229	36.16	+0.69
Liberal hold		Swing	−0.69	

=== Elections in the 1960s ===
1967 Victorian state election: Ballarat North
Party	Candidate	Votes	%	±%
Liberal	Tom Evans	11,169	50.09	−0.51
Labor	Kevin Flynn	7,342	32.93	+1.18
Democratic Labor	Walter Brown	3,787	16.98	−0.66
Total formal votes		22,298	98.10	−0.56
Informal votes		431	1.90	+0.56
Turnout		22,729	96.68	−0.01
Two-party-preferred result
Liberal	Tom Evans	14,388	64.53	−1.07
Labor	Kevin Flynn	7,910	35.47	+1.07
Liberal hold		Swing	−1.07	

1964 Victorian state election: Ballarat North
Party	Candidate	Votes	%	±%
Liberal and Country	Tom Evans	11,061	50.60	+14.67
Labor	John Hayes	6,940	31.75	−5.07
Democratic Labor	Walter Brown	3,857	17.64	−1.32
Total formal votes		21,858	98.66	+0.12
Informal votes		297	1.34	−0.12
Turnout		22,155	96.69	+0.99
Two-party-preferred result
Liberal and Country	Tom Evans	14,339	65.60	+5.82
Labor	John Hayes	7,519	34.40	−5.82
Liberal and Country hold		Swing	+5.82	

1961 Victorian state election: Ballarat North
Party	Candidate	Votes	%	±%
Labor	Philip Gray	7,842	36.82	+7.13
Liberal and Country	Tom Evans	7,653	35.93	+15.63
Democratic Labor	Walter Brown	4,038	18.96	+3.24
Country	Alexander Hoffert	1,765	8.29	−26.00
Total formal votes		21,298	98.54	−0.02
Informal votes		315	1.46	+0.02
Turnout		21,613	95.70	−0.57
Two-party-preferred result
Liberal and Country	Tom Evans	12,732	59.78	+22.45
Labor	Philip Gray	8,566	40.22	+40.22
Liberal and Country gain from Country		Swing	+22.45	

1960 Ballarat North state by-election
Party	Candidate	Votes	%	±%
Labor	Philip Gray	6,870	33.55	+3.86
Liberal and Country	Tom Evans	5,617	27.43	+7.13
Country	Alexander Hoffert	3,891	19.00	−15.29
Democratic Labor	Walter Brown	3,423	16.71	+0.99
Independent	Albert Woodward	673	3.28	+3.28
Total formal votes		20,474	98.14	−0.42
Informal votes		389	1.86	+0.42
Turnout		20,863	93.92	−2.35
Two-party-preferred result
Liberal and Country	Tom Evans	12,069	58.95	+21.62
Labor	Philip Gray	8,405	41.05	+41.05
Liberal and Country gain from Country		Swing	+21.62	

=== Elections in the 1950s ===
1958 Victorian state election: Ballarat North
Party	Candidate	Votes	%	±%
Country	Russell White	7,151	34.29	−3.61
Labor	Ron House	6,192	29.69	+4.93
Liberal and Country	Tom Evans	4,233	20.30	+3.40
Democratic Labor	James Meere	3,279	15.72	−4.72
Total formal votes		20,855	98.56	+0.14
Informal votes		304	1.44	−0.14
Turnout		21,159	96.27	−0.12
Two-candidate-preferred result
Country	Russell White	13,069	62.67	−8.58
Liberal and Country	Tom Evans	7,786	37.33	+37.33
Country hold		Swing	−8.58	

1955 Victorian state election: Ballarat North
Party	Candidate	Votes	%	±%
Country	Russell White	7,405	37.90	
Labor	Jack Smethurst	4,840	24.76	
Labor (A-C)	Thomas Lane	3,996	20.44	
Liberal and Country	Arthur Nicholson	3,305	16.90	
Total formal votes		19,546	98.42	
Informal votes		313	1.58	
Turnout		19,859	96.39	
Two-party-preferred result
Country	Russell White	13,927	71.25	
Labor	Jack Smethurst	5,619	28.75	
Country win		(new seat)		
