= Electoral results for the district of Maryborough and Daylesford =

Victoria, Australia, district election results

This is a list of electoral results for the electoral district of Maryborough and Daylesford in Victorian state elections.

== Members for Maryborough and Daylesford ==
Member	Party	Term
George Frost	Labor	1927–1942
Clive Stoneham	Labor	1942–1945

== Election results ==
=== Elections in the 1940s ===
1943 Victorian state election: Maryborough and Daylesford
Party	Candidate	Votes	%	±%
Labor	Clive Stoneham	5,806	60.0	−40.0
Country	Powley Smith	3,866	40.0	+40.0
Total formal votes		9,672	99.3	
Informal votes		66	0.7	
Turnout		9,738	91.1	
Labor hold		Swing	N/A	

1942 Maryborough and Daylesford state by-election
Party	Candidate	Votes	%	±%
Labor	Clive Stoneham	4,414	47.4	−52.6
Country	Alexander Anson	1,475	15.8	+15.8
Independent	Clement Frost	1,357	14.6	+14.6
Independent	Thomas Powell	1,156	12.4	+12.4
United Australia	Ian Duncan	910	9.8	+9.8
Total formal votes		9,312	98.3	
Informal votes		160	1.7	
Turnout		9,472	87.7	
Two-party-preferred result
Labor	Clive Stoneham	5,179	55.6	
Country	Alexander Anson	4,133	44.4	
Labor hold		Swing	N/A	

1940 Victorian state election: Maryborough and Daylesford
Party	Candidate	Votes	%	±%
Labor	George Frost	unopposed		
Labor hold		Swing		

=== Elections in the 1930s ===
1937 Victorian state election: Maryborough and Daylesford
Party	Candidate	Votes	%	±%
Labor	George Frost	unopposed		
Labor hold		Swing		

1935 Victorian state election: Maryborough and Daylesford
Party	Candidate	Votes	%	±%
Labor	George Frost	6,237	57.4	+6.7
United Australia	Stanley Bevan	2,419	22.3	−27.0
Country	Henry Bromfield	2,201	20.3	+20.3
Total formal votes		10,857	99.6	0.0
Informal votes		48	0.4	0.0
Turnout		10,905	95.3	−1.2
Two-party-preferred result
Labor	George Frost		59.4	+8.7
United Australia	Stanley Bevan		40.6	−8.7
Labor hold		Swing	+8.7	

- Two party preferred vote was estimated.

1932 Victorian state election: Maryborough and Daylesford
Party	Candidate	Votes	%	±%
Labor	George Frost	5,315	50.7	−49.3
United Australia	John Prictor	5,158	49.3	+49.3
Total formal votes		10,473	99.6	
Informal votes		42	0.4	
Turnout		10,515	96.5	
Labor hold		Swing	N/A	

=== Elections in the 1920s ===
1929 Victorian state election: Maryborough and Daylesford
Party	Candidate	Votes	%	±%
Labor	George Frost	unopposed		
Labor hold		Swing		

1927 Victorian state election: Maryborough and Daylesford
Party	Candidate	Votes	%	±%
Labor	George Frost	5,914	60.7	
Nationalist	Edmund Jowett	3,830	39.3	
Total formal votes		9,744	98.8	
Informal votes		121	1.2	
Turnout		9,865	74.3	
Labor hold		Swing		
