= Steve Elder =

Australian politician

Steve Elder OAM

Member of the Victorian Legislative Assembly for Ballarat North
- In office 23 August 1988 – 2 October 1992
- Preceded by: Tom Evans
- Succeeded by: District abolished

Member of the Victorian Legislative Assembly for Ripon
- In office 3 October 1992 – 17 September 1999
- Preceded by: Tom Austin
- Succeeded by: Joe Helper

Personal details
- Born: Stephen Noel Elder; 29 September 1956 (age 69)
- Party: Liberal

Stephen Noel Elder OAM (born 29 September 1956) is an Australian former politician, who was the executive director of the Catholic Education Office Melbourne in Victoria, Australia from 2006 to 2018.

He represented the Liberal Party and was the member of the Legislative Assembly of the Parliament of Victoria for Ballarat North from August 1988 to October 1992. After the seat was abolished in a redistribution, he was elected as the member for Ripon from October 1992 to August 1999, when he lost the seat in the rural landslide against the Kennett Government. Elder served as the Parliamentary Secretary for Education in the Victorian Government from 1992 to 1999.

He was also a member of the Senate of the Australian Catholic University, a member of the National Catholic Education Commission, a director of Catholic Network Australia Ltd, on the Board of Management of Church Resources and Mercy Health Foundation, a member of the Boards of the Catholic Development Fund, and the Victorian Registration and Qualifications Authority and a Director and Company Secretary of Catholic Capital Grants (Vic) Ltd.

In late 2018, Elder resigned as executive director of the Catholic Education Office, during the investigation of an unspecified workplace complaint. Despite overseeing the securing of billions of dollars of extra government funding for the Catholic education sector, there were concerns that he had created a rift between Catholic and independent schools, which had usually worked together to get more funding for their organisations.

Prior to serving as a parliamentarian, Elder had been a teacher and community worker.

Victorian Legislative Assembly
Preceded by Tom Evans	Member for Ballarat North; 1988–1992	District abolished
Preceded by Tom Austin	Member for Ripon; 1992–1999	Succeeded by Joe Helper
