= Tom Evans (Victorian politician) =

Australian politician (1917–2009)

Alexander Thomas Evans (14 February 1917 – 30 August 2009) was an Australian politician.

Evans was born in Creswick and attended Smeaton State School and Ballarat High School before entering the family business, then becoming a trainee manager at Woolworths. He joined the Liberal Party in 1946, and was a Creswick Shire Councillor from 1956 to 1962. He married Dawn Sim on 11 July 1970.

In 1960 Evans was elected to the Victorian Legislative Assembly as the member for Ballarat North. He served as a backbencher until his retirement in 1988. Evans served as Deputy Speaker of the Legislative Assembly (1 January 1979 – 1 December 1982) and died in Creswick on 30 August 2009.

Victorian Legislative Assembly
Preceded by Russell White	Member for Ballarat North; 1960–1988	Succeeded by Steve Elder
