= Ivy Weber =

Australian Politician

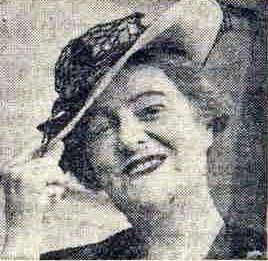

Member of the Victorian Legislative Assembly for Nunawading
- In office 2 October 1937 – 18 July 1943
- Preceded by: William Boyland
- Succeeded by: Bob Gray

Personal details
- Born: Ivy Lavinia Filshie; 7 June 1892 Captains Flat, New South Wales
- Died: 6 March 1976 (aged 83) Camberwell, Melbourne, Victoria, Australia
- Party: Independent
- Spouses: Thomas Mitchell (m. 1915; died 1917) Clarence Weber (m. 1919; died 1930)
- Occupation: Physical culturist, political organiser, politician

Ivy Lavinia Weber (7 June 1892 – 6 March 1976) was an Australian politician.

Born at Captains Flat in New South Wales to schoolteacher John Filshie and his wife Elizabeth Seaman, she was educated at the local schools, eventually becoming a physical culturist and organiser. On 11 December 1915 in Sydney she married Thomas Mitchell, a stock and station agent, with whom she had one son. They moved to Melbourne, but Thomas was killed in World War I in 1917. She married her second husband, fellow physical culturist Clarence Weber, on 7 March 1919; they had one son and two daughters.

Following her husband's death in 1930, she experimented with several occupations, including as a lecturer on health and diet and a Country Party organiser. In 1937, she was elected to the Victorian Legislative Assembly for Nunawading, as an independent. She generally supported Country Party Premier Albert Dunstan in the Assembly. She resigned from the Assembly in 1943 to contest the federal seat of Henty in the election of that year; she came fifth in a field of six candidates with 3.9% of the vote, and the seat was won by another independent, Arthur Coles.

Weber contested Box Hill unsuccessfully in 1945 and held various positions subsequently; in 1943 she had been president of the Victorian section of Women for Canberra. From 1950 to 1952 she was organising secretary for the women's section of the Victorian Country Party. After an unsuccessful stint as a guest house operator, she organised for Blind Babies Homes in 1955 and then became organising secretary of the Australian Women's Movement against Socialism. She died in 1976 at Camberwell, and was cremated at Springvale Crematorium.

She was the first woman elected at a general election in Victoria (Millie Peacock had previously won the seat of Allandale at a by-election), and the first woman in Australia to win a seat as an independent.

== Awards ==
Weber was inducted into the Victorian Honour Roll of Women in 2001.

Victorian Legislative Assembly
Preceded by William Boyland	Member for Nunawading; 1937–1943	Succeeded by Bob Gray
