= Henry Angus (politician) =

Australian politician

Henry Angus (16 February 1865 – 2 April 1934) was an Australian politician.

He was born at Duneed near Geelong to farmer Joseph Armstrong Angus and Sarah Scott. His family moved to Mystic Park in 1874, and Angus became a farmer at Mincha West. On 26 October 1887 he married Margaret Wilson, with whom he had four sons. He purchased land at Mystic Park in 1897 but was forced to sell by drought in 1900; he then relocated to Tresco. From 1901 to 1912 he served on Kerang Shire Council (president 1909–10).

In 1911 he was elected to the Victorian Legislative Assembly as the member for Gunbower. Eventually a Nationalist, he was part of the Economy Party faction and served as a minister without portfolio from 1917 to 1918. He was again minister without portfolio from 1920 to 1923, but in 1924 was disendorsed after voting against a redistribution bill. He was readmitted after the election and from 1928 to 1929 was Minister of Lands and Water Supply. Angus remained in parliament until his death at Tresco in 1934.

Victorian Legislative Assembly
Preceded by John Cullen	Member for Gunbower; 1911–1934	Succeeded by Norman Martin
