= Alexander Peacock =

Australian politician (1861–1933)

The Honourable Sir Alexander Peacock KCMG
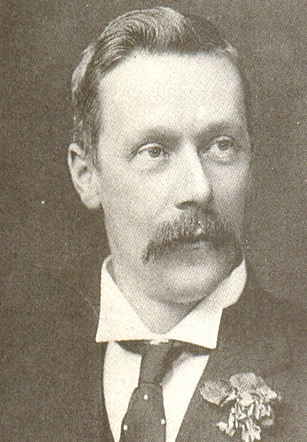

20th Premier of Victoria
- In office 12 February 1901 – 10 June 1902
- Constituency: Clunes and Allandale
- Preceded by: George Turner
- Succeeded by: William Irvine
- In office 18 June 1914 – 29 November 1917
- Preceded by: William Watt
- Succeeded by: John Bowser
- Constituency: Allandale
- In office 28 April 1924 – 18 July 1924
- Preceded by: Harry Lawson
- Succeeded by: George Prendergast
- Constituency: Allandale

15th Speaker of the Victorian Legislative Assembly
- In office 4 July 1928 – 7 October 1933
- Preceded by: Oswald Snowball
- Succeeded by: Maurice Blackburn

Personal details
- Born: Alexander James Peacock; 11 June 1861 Creswick, Victoria, British Empire
- Died: 7 October 1933 (aged 72) Creswick, Victoria, Australia
- Spouse: Millie Gertrude Holden

Sir Alexander James Peacock KCMG (11 June 1861 – 7 October 1933) was an Australian politician who served as the 20th Premier of Victoria.

== Early years ==
Peacock was born of Scottish descent at Creswick, the first Victorian Premier born after the gold rush of the 1850s and the attainment of self-government in Victoria. He was the eldest of five children of James Henry Peacock, draper and later tailor from Suffolk, England, and his wife Mary Jane Murphy from Cork, Ireland. His primary education was at Creswick State School, and his secondary at Mrs. Fiddian's Grammar School, as a pupil-teacher – an apprentice teacher taking classes by day and studying by night. He told an interviewer in 1902 that his mother 'with warm maternal affection, endeavoured to give her son the best education obtainable', but that his father's business suffered 'heavy losses', forcing him to give up plans to study at Melbourne University and to take a job in a grocery, where he worked from 9.00 in the morning to 8.00 at night. His interviewer commented that 'This short, sharp experience made a vivid impression upon him, and doubtless formed the flame of rebellion against sweaters and sweating'.

Peacock's lack of tertiary qualifications did not hamper his career. He found employment as a junior clerk in a legal mining manager's office in Creswick – another kind of apprenticeship. After a few years, he established his firm, managing the legal affairs of some of the richest gold-mining companies in Victoria. By 1889 he was president of the Legal Managers' Institute of Victoria, and he remained in the business for most of his life.

He was distantly related to the family of the politician Andrew Peacock. He was prominent in the Australian Natives' Association and the movement for Australian federation in the 1880s and '90s.

He was a man whom it was difficult to dislike. A biographer has described him as 'tall, imposing, jovial and moustached', a man who 'did all the right things as representative of the district, had a suave word for everybody, patted children on the head and was extremely popular'. He was famous for having what Webb called a laugh 'of appalling noisiness'.

== Entry in Parliament ==
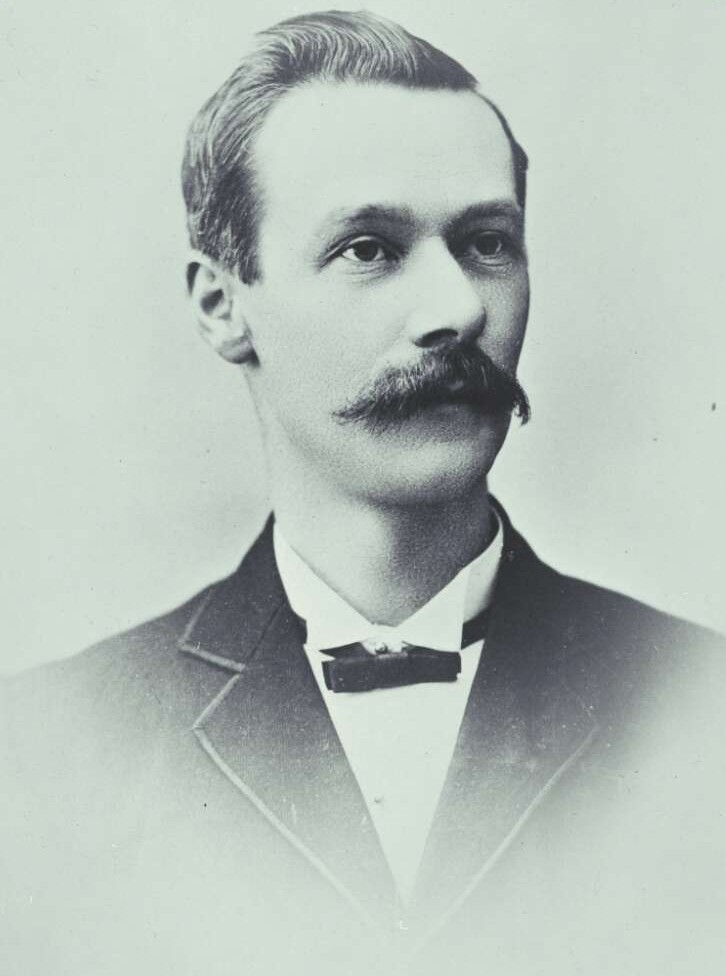
Peacock in 1898.

In 1889 Peacock was elected to the Victorian Legislative Assembly for the seat of Clunes and Allendale, near Ballarat, which he held for 43 years. Although he was a moderate liberal, he was a minister without portfolio in the conservative government of James Munro (1890–1892), and Minister of Public Instruction in the Shiels government (1892–1893) and Postmaster-General 15 November 1892 to 23 January 1893. He was Chief Secretary in both the governments of Sir George Turner from 1894 to 1899 and 1900 to 1901, being also Minister for Public Instruction in the first and Minister for Labour in the second.

In 1897 Peacock was elected as one of the Victorian delegates to the Constitutional Convention which wrote the Australian Constitution.

== Premier for the first time ==
In 1901, he chose not to stand for new Parliament of Australia. This was partly because the federal electorate covering the area he represented, the seat of Ballaarat, was being contested by Alfred Deakin. Instead, he stayed in Victorian politics and when Premier Turner resigned to contest the first federal elections, Peacock succeeded him and became Premier.

But by this time public support for the liberals was waning, and the new conservative leader, William Irvine, mounted a public campaign for "retrenchment"—reduction in the size of the Parliament and the public service, and cuts to government spending. Peacock as a good liberal resisted this campaign, but in June 1902 Irvine carried a vote of no-confidence in Peacock's government and at the subsequent election the liberals and their Labor allies were heavily defeated. He was made a Knight Commander of the Order of St Michael and St George in 1902.

Peacock stayed in opposition during Irvine's ministry, but in 1907 he returned to office as Chief Secretary and Minister for Labour in the government of Thomas Bent. By this time the distinction between liberals and conservatives was fading in the face of the rising challenge of the Labor Party, and from about this time the non-Labor members became officially the Liberal Party.

== Premier for the second time ==
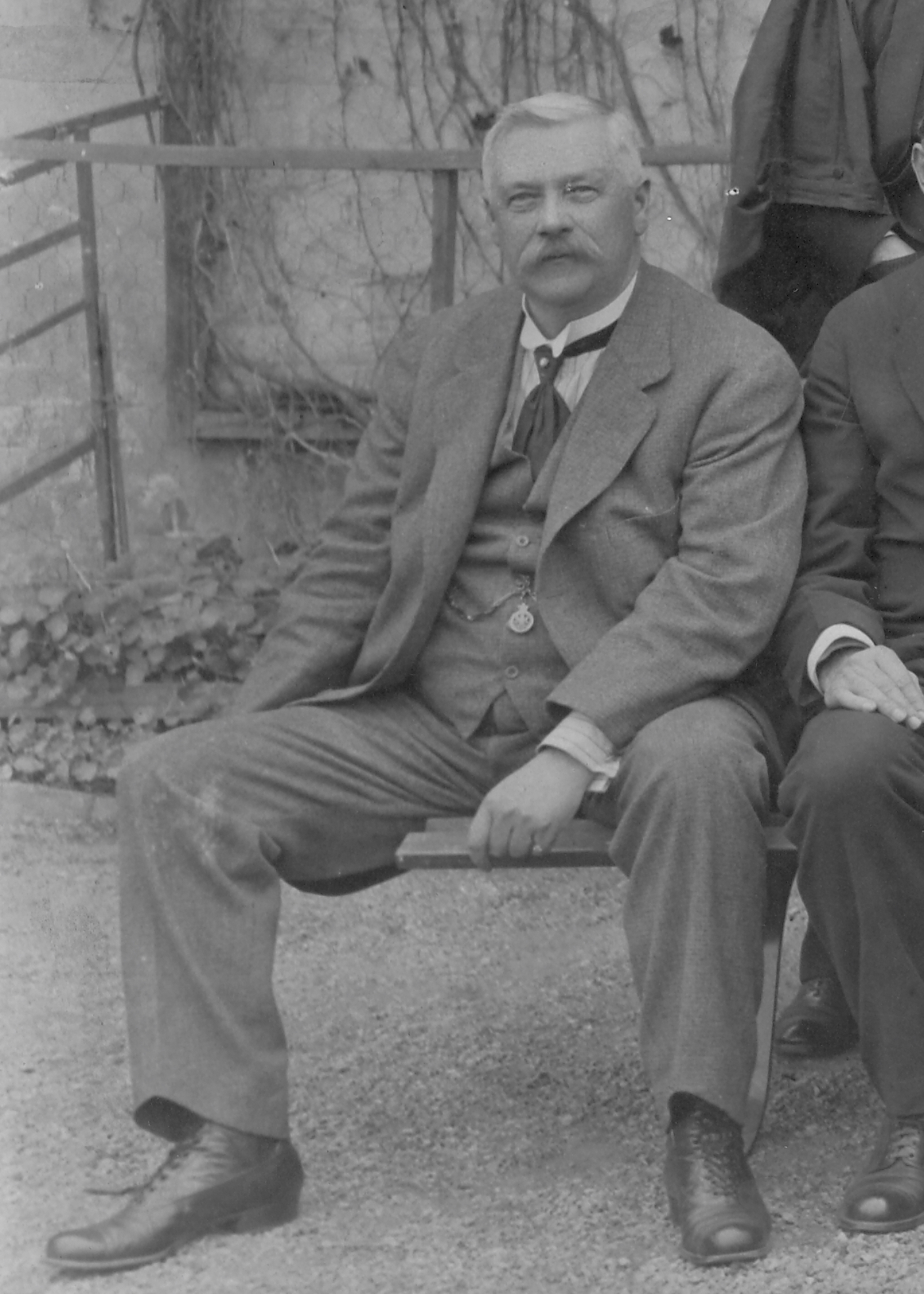
Peacock at the 1916 Premiers' Conference in Adelaide

Peacock was Minister for Public Instruction in the government of William Watt in 1913, and in June 1914 Watt resigned so he contest a seat in Federal Parliament, Peacock once again became Premier, and also Treasurer, at the head of a Liberal government.

Soon afterwards, World War I broke out, and Peacock's government joined the initial enthusiastic response to the war. By 1916, however, the war was placing increasing strain on the Victorian economy, as labour shortages hit its important rural industries. This caused increased opposition to the Liberals in rural areas, led by the Victorian Farmers Union (which later became the Country Party). In 1917 the Liberals were renamed the Nationalist Party. At the November 1917 elections, the Nationalists were split into pro and anti-Peacock factions, and the anti-Peacock group swept the country seats. The anti-Peacock leader John Bowser then became Premier.

Peacock was a very durable politician, however, and by 1920 he was back in office, as Minister for Public Instruction and Minister for Labour in Harry Lawson's Nationalist government, positions he held until 1924.

== Premier for the third time ==
The coalition government that Lawson formed broke down in March 1924 when the Country Party made demands Lawson would not accept. The Country Party ministers resigned, and then united with Labor, ending Lawson's term. Lawson resigned and Peacock was again chosen as leader of the Nationalist Party and became Premier for the third time. He immediately brought in a bill to reduce the disproportionate representation of country areas. Dissent grew from within the party and Peacock called an election, at which Labor emerged as the largest party, though well short of a majority. Peacock resigned again, and was succeeded by a minority Labor government led by George Prendergast.

Peacock returned as Minister for Public Instruction and Minister for Labour in John Allan's Country Party government, holding these positions until 1927, when he left ministerial office for the last time. In 1928 he was elected Speaker, a position he held until his death in 1933.

== Personal life ==
In January 1901, Peacock married Millie Gertrude Holden in Port Fairy. Millie, Lady Peacock was active in community organisations like the Red Cross, and carried much of her husband's local electoral work, earning the title 'the deputy member for Allandale'. When Alex Peacock died in 1933 Lady Peacock was persuaded to stand for his seat in a by-election, becoming the first woman member of the Victorian parliament. Her maiden speech – recalling her husband's legislation on worker's wages and conditions – was her last; she announced her retirement before the next election, in 1935.

== Australian Natives' Association ==
Alex Peacock joined the Creswick branch of the Australian Natives' Association in 1881, and became branch secretary in 1882, a position he held until 1901. In 1884 he was elected to the ANA board of directors, and in the following year was appointed Chief President. He was three times the Chief President, in 1885-1887 and 1893–1894, and a member of the board until 1904. He was always an active office holder in the association, expanding its membership and branches in the 1880s, and leading it into an increasingly public role in the 1890s, especially in area of Federation.

Peacock's high-profile within the Australian Natives Association assisted his parliamentary career. As a benefit society the ANA was banned from undertaking party political activity, but in the late 1880s and the 1890s ANA members formed the backbone of the organisations supporting Liberal candidates in the electorates. Peacock learnt his brand of 'advanced Liberalism' in ANA lectures and debates: a commitment to full democracy, including woman suffrage, and to active state intervention in the interests of public welfare. Beatrice Webb described him as having neither 'intellectual conviction nor intellectual prejudices', but 'ready to try any plausible remedy for actual suffering'.

== Mason ==
Peacock served as Grand Master of the United Grand Lodge of Victoria of Freemasons from 1900 to 1905. At age 39 he was the youngest person ever to obtain that position in Australian Freemasonry, before or since. He pleaded heavy parliamentary commitments when he retired as Grand Master in 1905.

Victorian Legislative Assembly
District created	Member for Clunes and Allandale; 1889–1904	District abolished
District created	Member for Allandale; 1904–1933	Succeeded by Millie Peacock
Preceded by Oswald Snowball	Speaker of the Victorian Legislative Assembly; 1928–1933	Succeeded by Maurice Blackburn
Political offices
Preceded by Sir Frederick Sargood	Minister of Public Instruction; 1892–1893	Succeeded by James Campbell
Preceded by James Patterson	Chief Secretary of Victoria; 1894–1899	Succeeded by Allan McLean
Preceded by Richard Baker	Minister of Public Instruction; 1894–1899	Succeeded by James McCay
Preceded by Allan McLean	Chief Secretary of Victoria; 1900–1901	Succeeded by William Trenwith
Preceded by Alfred Billson	Minister of Public Instruction; 1913	Succeeded by Thomas Livingston
Preceded by George Turner	Premier of Victoria; 1901–1902	Succeeded by William Irvine
Preceded by William Watt	Premier of Victoria; 1914–1917	Succeeded by John Bowser
Preceded by Harry Lawson	Premier of Victoria; 1924	Succeeded by George Prendergast
Masonic offices
Preceded by The Lord Brassey	Grand Master of the United Grand Lodge of Victoria; 1900-1905	Succeeded by Doctor Walter Balls-Headley
