= Electoral district of Clunes and Allandale =

Former electoral district of Victoria

Clunes and Allandale Victoria—Legislative Assembly
- State: Victoria
- Created: 1889
- Abolished: 1904
- Namesake: Towns of Clunes & Allendale
- Demographic: Rural
- Coordinates: 37°20′S 143°52′E

The Electoral district of Clunes and Allandale was an electoral district of the Victorian Legislative Assembly. It was created by the Electoral Act Amendment Act 1888, taking effect at the 1889 elections. It was abolished by the Victorian Electoral Districts Boundaries Act 1903 (taking effect at the 1904 elections) when several new districts were created.

== Members ==
Member	Party	Term
Sir Alexander Peacock	Unaligned	April 1889 – May 1904

== See also ==
- Parliaments of the Australian states and territories
- List of members of the Victorian Legislative Assembly
