= Electoral district of Ballarat North =

Former state electoral district of Victoria, Australia

Ballarat North Victoria—Legislative Assembly
- State: Victoria
- Created: 1955
- Abolished: 1992
- Namesake: Ballarat
- Demographic: Rural
- Coordinates: 37°32′30″S 143°51′45″E

Ballarat North was an electoral district of the Legislative Assembly in the Australian state of Victoria. It was created in the redistribution preceding the 1955 election, covering the northern suburbs and the rural areas north of Ballarat.

Its mostly a safe seat for the Liberal Party, although Labor candidate and future Premier Steve Bracks came close to winning it in the 1988 election.

It was abolished in the redistribution preceding the 1992 election, mostly being replaced by the new district of Ballarat West.

== Members for Ballarat North ==
Member	Party	Term
Russell White	Country	1955–1960
Tom Evans	Liberal and Country	1960–1965
Tom Evans	Liberal	1965–1988
Steve Elder	Liberal	1988–1992
