= Millie Peacock =

Australian politician

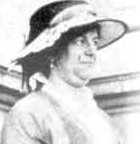

Member of the Victorian Legislative Assembly for Allandale
- In office 1 November 1933 – 1 February 1935
- Preceded by: Alexander Peacock
- Succeeded by: Thomas Parkin

Personal details
- Born: Millie Gertrude Holden; 3 August 1870 East Framlingham, Victoria, Australia
- Died: 7 February 1948 (aged 77) Creswick, Victoria, Australia
- Resting place: Creswick cemetery
- Party: UAP
- Other political affiliations: AWNL
- Spouse: Alexander Peacock (m. 1901; died 1933)

Millie Gertrude Peacock, Lady Peacock (née Holden; 3 August 1870 – 7 February 1948), was the first woman elected to the Parliament of Victoria. She was the wife of Sir Alexander Peacock, a three-time Premier of Victoria. Upon his death in 1933, Lady Peacock won the by-election to replace him in parliament. She served only a single term, retiring at the 1935 state election.

== Early life ==
Millie Gertrude Holden was the second of two daughters born in East Framlingham, Victoria, to Marianne (née Arnold) and John Bryson Holden.

Her parents were born in Ireland. Her father, originally from County Antrim, had arrived in Victoria in 1855, and became a successful land agent and auctioneer in Port Fairy. Her mother died when she was a few months old, and her father remarried Millie's maternal aunt Jane Ellen Arnold. Millie was given eight half-brothers and half-sisters from this union, and Jane was referred to as her mother throughout her life.

Holden attended Methodist Ladies' College, Melbourne. She was first introduced to politician Alexander Peacock in 1899, when her family hosted members of the Australian Natives' Association during a conference. They married on 1 January 1901, when she was 30 and he was 38. After her husband's knighthood the following year she was known as "Lady Peacock".

Lady Peacock was the President of the Creswick Red Cross from 1914–1918, and a member of the Ladies Benevolent Society, Children's Welfare Association, and Royal Victorian Institute for the Blind Auxiliary.

The Peacocks did not have any children. They appear to have stayed close to Millie's family, especially Millie's only full sibling Agnes (Nellie) and her husband, solicitor Charles Jonas Horsfall. When Sir Alexander Peacock died on 7 October 1933, Charles was named an executor of his will.

== Parliament ==
Following Sir Alexander Peacock's death in 1933, Robert Menzies encouraged Lady Peacock to stand in the by-election for her husband's seat of Allandale. She did so reluctantly and, because she was mourning her husband's death, made no speeches. She was elected and sworn in as the first woman member of the Victorian Legislative Assembly on 21 November 1933.

Lady Peacock only gave one speech in parliament, on the third reading of the Factories Act Bill. She spoke on her husband's role in forming the bill.

She retired from politics at the end of her term in 1935, saying that representing a country electorate in parliament was no place for a woman. She stated that her constituents were unwilling to discuss their concerns with a woman. Nonetheless she felt that she had "broken the ice" for women to enter the Victorian parliament.

== Death ==
Lady Peacock continued her community work at Creswick. She died in 1948, and is buried next to her husband.

== Recognition ==
Peacock was posthumously inducted onto the Victorian Honour Roll of Women in 2002.

A tunnel boring machine used in Victoria is named after her.

Victorian Legislative Assembly
Preceded by Sir Alexander Peacock	Member for Allandale; 1933–1935	Succeeded by Thomas Parkin
