= Richard Toutcher =

Australian politician

Richard Frederick Toutcher (27 May 1861 – 6 September 1941) was an Australian politician.

Toutcher was born in Maryborough to Charles and Ellen Toutcher and attended the local grammar school. He became a civil servant in the Postal Department and was active in the campaign for Federation. Considered a Deakinite Liberal, he was elected to the Victorian Legislative Assembly for Ararat in 1897, transferring to Stawell and Ararat in 1904. He was Minister of Public Instruction and Forests from April to July 1924. He continued in the Assembly until 1935, serving as a member of the Nationalist and United Australia parties. Toutcher died in Elsternwick in 1941.

Victorian Legislative Assembly
Preceded by William McLellan	Member for Ararat; 1897–1904	Abolished
New seat	Member for Stawell and Ararat; 1904–1935	Succeeded by Alec McDonald
