= 1937 Victorian state election =

State election in Victoria, Australia

- 2 October 1937

45 (of the 65) seats in the Victorian Legislative Assembly 33 seats needed for a majority
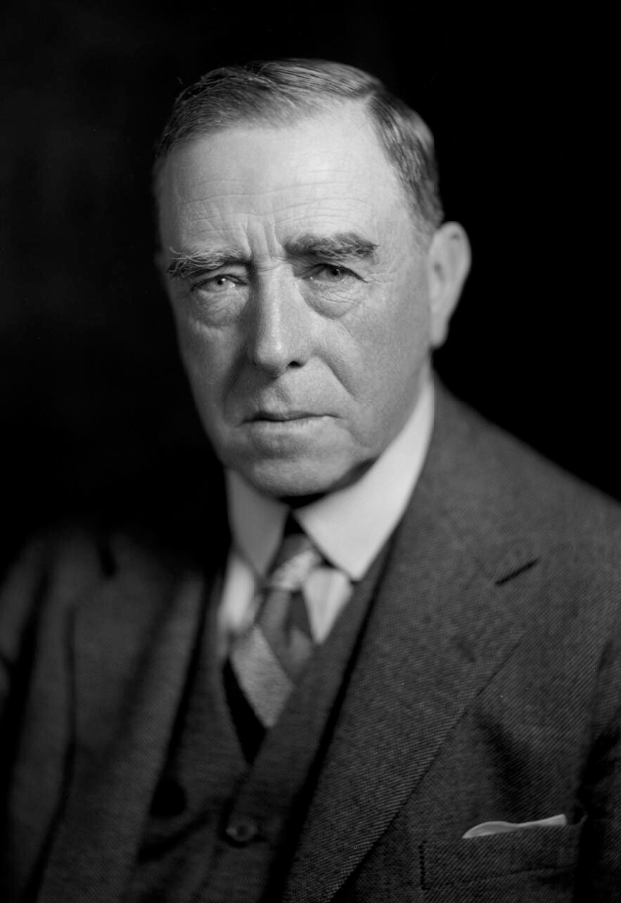

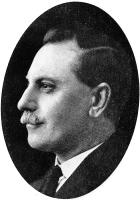

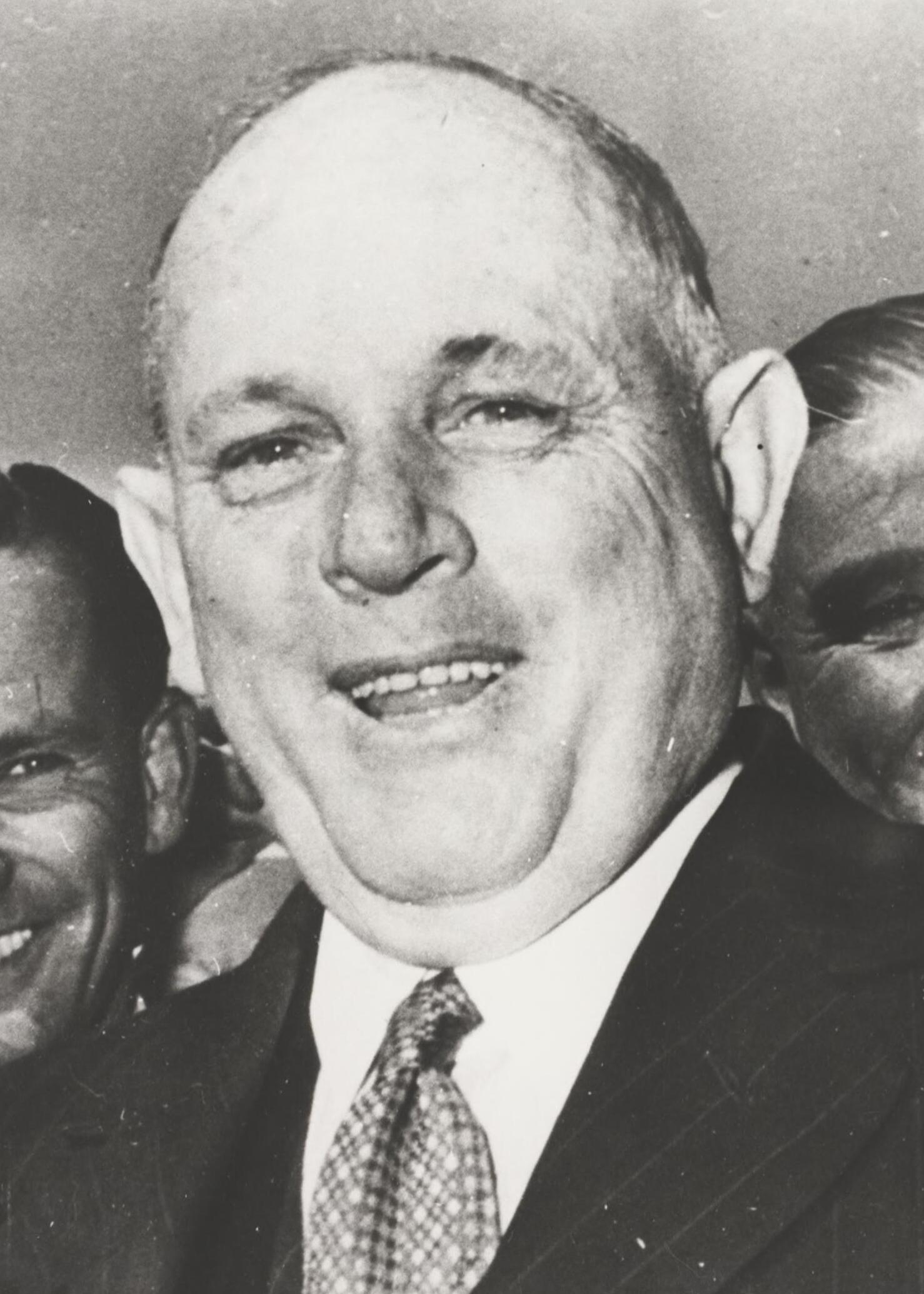
	First party	Second party	Third party
Leader	Sir Stanley Argyle	Tom Tunnecliffe	Albert Dunstan
Party	United Australia	Labor	United Country
Leader since	3 September 1930	14 July 1932	14 March 1935
Leader's seat	Toorak	Collingwood	Korong and Eaglehawk
Last election	25 seats	17 seats	20 seats
Seats before	24 seats	18 seats	20 seats
Seats won	21 seats	20 seats	20 seats
Seat change	▼3	▲2	0
Percentage	39.56%	41.03%	11.35%
Swing	▲3.39	▲3.10	▼2.36
Premier before election
Albert Dunstan
United Country
Elected Premier
Albert Dunstan
United Country

The 1937 Victorian state election was held in the Australian state of Victoria on Saturday 2 October 1937 to elect 45 of the 65 members of the state's Legislative Assembly.

== Background ==
On 21 March 1936, Patrick Denigan of the Labor Party won the seat of Allandale in a by-election following the death of UAP member Thomas Parkin. This changed the number of seats in the assembly to UAP 24, Labor 18.

== Results ==
=== Legislative Assembly ===
Victorian state election, 2 October 1937 Legislative Assembly << 1935–1940 >>
Enrolled voters	848,680				
Votes cast	786,492		Turnout	93.96	−0.46
Informal votes	10,938		Informal	1.37	−0.28
Summary of votes by party
Party	Primary votes	%	Swing	Seats	Change
Labor	322,699	41.03	+3.10	20	+2
United Australia	311,168	39.56	+3.39	21	−3
United Country	89,286	11.35	−2.36	20	±0
Communist	5,700	0.72	−0.39	0	±0
Independent	57,639	7.33	−3.75	4	+1
Total	786,492			65	

== See also ==
- Candidates of the 1937 Victorian state election
- 1937 Victorian Legislative Council election
