= Thomas Parkin =

Australian politician

Thomas Parkin (7 April 1870 – 29 January 1936) was an Australian politician.

He was born in Kingston to grazier John Parkin and Bridget Malone. He attended Creswick Grammar School and Geelong Grammar School and then worked for a Geelong wool firm. He served with the Victorian Mounted Rifles in the Second Boer War, in which he was wounded. He was a grazier and served on Creswick Shire Council from 1903 to 1936, with three terms as president (1908–09, 1917–18, 1926–27). In 1935 he was elected to the Victorian Legislative Assembly as the United Australia Party member for Allandale, but he died less than a year later at Kingston.

Victorian Legislative Assembly
Preceded by Millie Peacock	Member for Allandale; 1935–1936	Succeeded by Patrick Denigan
