= Electoral district of Allandale =

Former state electoral district of Victoria, Australia

Coordinates: 37°30′S 143°40′E

Allandale Victoria—Legislative Assembly
- State: Victoria
- Created: 1904
- Abolished: 1955
- Demographic: Rural

The electoral district of Allandale was an electoral district of the Legislative Assembly in the Australian state of Victoria, located north-west of Ballarat.

The district was bounded by the city of Ballarat, Lake Burrumbeet and Burrumbeet Creek. The district was created in the electoral redistribution which came into effect in 1904, when 42 districts were abolished, including the Electoral district of Clunes and Allandale. Alexander Peacock was the last member for Clunes and Allandale.

Allandale was abolished in the electoral redistribution which came into effect in 1955, 19 new districts including Ballarat North and Ballarat South were created. Russell White, the last member for Allandale went on to represent Ballarat North 1955–1960.

== Members ==
Member	Party	Term
Alexander Peacock	Ministerial	1904–1911
Alexander Peacock	Fusion Liberal	1911–1916
Alexander Peacock	Nationalist	1916–1931
Alexander Peacock	United Australia	1931–1933
Millie Peacock	United Australia	1933–1935
Thomas Parkin	United Australia	1935–1936
Patrick Denigan	Labor	1936–1945
Russell White	Country	1945–1955
