= Russell White (Australian politician) =

Australian politician

Russell Thomas White CBE (19 June 1895 – 3 September 1981) was an Australian politician.

White was born at Windermere, Victoria to farmer William Nicholas White and Ellen Janet Banfield. He attended Grenville College in Ballarat and became a dairy farmer at Cardigan. On 20 December 1917 he married Isabel Wade, with whom he had three children. He was the founding president of the local branch of the Country Party, and served on Ballarat Shire Council from 1928–46, with two periods as president (1934–37, 1942–43).

In 1945 White was elected to the Victorian Legislative Assembly for Allandale. From 29 March 1951 to 20 May 1952 he was minister without portfolio and cabinet secretary in the Country Party government.

On 20 May 1952, White assumed the State Development portfolio. In December 1952 the government was defeated and White moved to the back bench. In May 1955 his seat of Allandale was abolished and he won the new seat of Ballarat North. He resigned from parliament in September 1960 to become chairman of the Trotting Control Board. He was appointed a Commander of the Order of the British Empire in 1966.

White retired in 1973 and died at Ballarat on 3 September 1981.

Victorian Legislative Assembly
Preceded by Patrick Denigan	Member for Allandale; 1945–1955	Abolished
New seat	Member for Ballarat North; 1955–1960	Succeeded by Tom Evans
