= Electoral district of Stawell and Ararat =

Former state electoral district of Victoria, Australia

Coordinates: 37°10′S 142°50′E

Stawell and Ararat Victoria—Legislative Assembly
- State: Victoria
- Created: 1904
- Abolished: 1945
- Demographic: Rural

The Electoral district of Stawell and Ararat was an electoral district of the Victorian Legislative Assembly. It was created from the Electoral district of Stawell and Electoral district of Ararat which were abolished in 1904.

== Members ==
Member	Party	Term
Richard Toutcher	Comm. Liberal	1904–1935
Alec McDonald	Country	1935–1945

== See also ==
- Parliaments of the Australian states and territories
- List of members of the Victorian Legislative Assembly
