= William Boyland (Australian politician) =

Australian politician

William James Boyland (1 June 1885 – 25 July 1967) was an Australian politician.

He was born in Richmond to grocer William Boyland and Emma Rebecca Payne. He was an auctioneer before serving with the 37th Battalion during World War I. On 8 November 1921 he married Ella Mary Mates. He became a company director and owned land at Box Hill. He served on Nunawading Shire Council from 1922 to 1925 and on Box Hill City Council from 1928 to 1947 (mayor 1933–35, 1939–40). In 1934 he won a by-election for the Victorian Legislative Assembly seat of Nunawading, representing the United Australia Party; he held the seat until his defeat in 1937. During World War II he was a manpower officer with the 10th Brigade. Boyland died in Box Hill in 1967.

Victorian Legislative Assembly
Preceded by Robert Menzies	Member for Nunawading; 1934–1937	Succeeded by Ivy Weber
