= Norman Martin =

Australian politician

Sir Norman Angus Martin (24 April 1893 – 8 October 1979) was an Australian politician.

Martin was born in Port Melbourne to grazier Angus Martin and Ruth Gale. After serving as an artilleryman in World War I, he became a farmer at Cohuna. On 29 January 1919 he married nurse Gladys (Anne) Barrett, with whom he had two children. He served on Cohuna Shire Council from 1922 to 1945 and was twice president (1930–31, 1939–40).

In 1934 Martin won a by-election for the Victorian Legislative Assembly seat of Gunbower; although he defeated the endorsed Country Party candidate, he was admitted to the parliamentary Country Party when parliament next sat. He was party whip from 1937 to 1938. Martin was a minister without portfolio from 1938 to 1943, Minister of Agriculture from 1943 to 1945 and Minister of Mines in 1943. He resigned in 1945 to become Victoria's Agent-General in London; he retired from that post in 1949 and was knighted. He moved to Melbourne and became a businessman, holding the chairmanship of several company boards. From 1958 to 1973 he was chairman of the Inland Meat Authority. Martin died at East Melbourne in 1979.

Victorian Legislative Assembly
| Preceded by Henry Angus | Member for Gunbower; 1934–1945 | Abolished |
