= Alec McDonald (politician) =

Australian politician

Alexander McDonald (12 June 1878 – 9 September 1956) was an Australian politician.

He was born in Ararat to farmer Hugh McDonald and Annie Poison. He attended state school and became a grazier at Chrocan near Mount Ararat. In 1913 he married Jemima Bain, with whom he had a son; around 1950 he married Mary Cairns Forsyth. He served on Ararat Shire Council from 1924 to 1955, with two terms as president (1928–29, 1937–38). In 1935 he was elected to the Victorian Legislative Assembly as the Country Party member for Stawell and Ararat. He served until 1945, when his seat was abolished and he was defeated contesting Ripon. McDonald moved to Ballarat in 1956, but died in Ararat that year.

Victorian Legislative Assembly
Preceded by Richard Toutcher	Member for Stawell and Ararat; 1935–1945	District abolished
