= Electoral district of Nunawading =

Former state electoral district of Victoria, Australia

Coordinates: 37.817°S 145.177°E

Nunawading Victoria—Legislative Assembly
- State: Victoria
- Created: 1927
- Abolished: 1945
- Namesake: Suburb of Nunawading
- Demographic: Outer metropolitan

The electoral district of Nunawading was an electoral district of the Legislative Assembly in the Australian state of Victoria, located in the eastern Melbourne suburb of Nunawading. A notable former member was future Prime Minister, Robert Menzies.

It was abolished in 1945, replaced by Box Hill.

== Members for Nunawading ==
Member	Party	Term
Edmund Greenwood	Nationalist	1927–1929
Robert Menzies	Nationalist	1929–1931
Robert Menzies	United Australia	1931–1934
William Boyland	United Australia	1934–1937
Ivy Weber	Independent	1937–1943
Bob Gray	Labor	1943–1945
