= Electoral district of Maryborough and Daylesford =

Former electoral district of the Victorian Legislative Assembly, Australia

Coordinates: 37°12′S 143°55′E

Maryborough and Daylesford Victoria—Legislative Assembly
- State: Victoria
- Created: 1927
- Abolished: 1945
- Namesake: Town of Maryborough, Town of Daylesford
- Demographic: Rural

The Electoral district of Maryborough and Daylesford was an electoral district of the Victorian Legislative Assembly. It included the towns of Maryborough and Daylesford, around 168 km and 155 km north-west of Melbourne respectively.

It was created when the electoral districts of Maryborough and Daylesford were combined in 1927; George Frost was the last member for Maryborough.

== Members for Maryborough and Daylesford ==
Member	Party	Term
George Frost	Labor	1927–1942
Clive Stoneham	Labor	1942–1945

== See also ==
- Parliaments of the Australian states and territories
- List of members of the Victorian Legislative Assembly
