= George Frost (Australian politician) =

Australian politician

George Clement Frost (24 February 1869 – 29 October 1942) was an English-born Australian politician.

He was born in Lowestoft in Suffolk to master mariner George Frost and Mary Ann Harding Moore. He left school at nine and began work as a baker's assistant. He migrated to Victoria in 1889 and worked for a baker in Maryborough; he bought the bakery in 1894. Around 1893 he married Christina Ogilvie, with whom he had eight children. From 1913 to 1927 he served on Maryborough Borough Council, with three terms as mayor (1917–18, 1923–24, 1926–27). He sold his bakery in 1919 and in 1920 was elected to the Victorian Legislative Assembly as the Labor member for Maryborough. He transferred to Maryborough and Daylesford in 1927, and served until his death in Maryborough in 1942.

Victorian Legislative Assembly
Preceded by Alfred Outtrim	Member for Maryborough; 1920–1927	Abolished
New seat	Member for Maryborough and Daylesford; 1927–1942	Succeeded by Clive Stoneham
