= Patrick Denigan =

Australian politician (1879–1962)

Patrick Louis Denigan (4 June 1879 – 1 November 1962) was an Australian politician.

He was born at Glendonald near Creswick to farmer Thomas Denigan and Mary Agnes Downing. He was a gold miner at Allandale before becoming a farmer at Bridgewater. On 12 October 1910 he married dressmaker Annie Smith, with whom he had a daughter. He served on Marong Shire Council from 1924 to 1927 and from 1929 to 1936, and was president from 1932 to 1933.

In 1936 Denigan won a by-election for the Victorian Legislative Assembly seat of Allandale, representing the Labor Party. He held his seat until 1945, when he was defeated. He subsequently moved to Clunes and then to Ballarat, where he died in 1962.

Victorian Legislative Assembly
Preceded by Thomas Parkin	Member for Allandale; 1936–1945	Succeeded by Russell White
