= Electoral district of Gunbower =

Former state electoral district of Victoria, Australia

Gunbower Victoria—Legislative Assembly
- State: Victoria
- Created: 1889
- Abolished: 1945
- Namesake: Town of Gunbower
- Demographic: Rural
- Coordinates: 36°58′S 144°22′E

The Electoral district of Gunbower was an electoral district of the Victorian Legislative Assembly. It was created by The Electoral Act Amendment Act 1888 taking effect at the 1889 elections. The district was bound by the County of Bendigo and the Loddon, Murray and Campaspe Rivers.

== Members ==
Member	Party	Term
James McColl		1889–1901
John Cullen	Ministerialist	1901–1911
Henry Angus	Fusion Liberal	1911–1916
Henry Angus	Nationalist	1916–1931
Henry Angus	United Australia	1931–1934
Norman Martin	Country	1934–1945

== See also ==
- Parliaments of the Australian states and territories
- List of members of the Victorian Legislative Assembly
