= 1935 Victorian state election =

Regional elections in Australia

- 2 March 1935

53 (of the 65) seats in the Victorian Legislative Assembly 33 seats needed for a majority
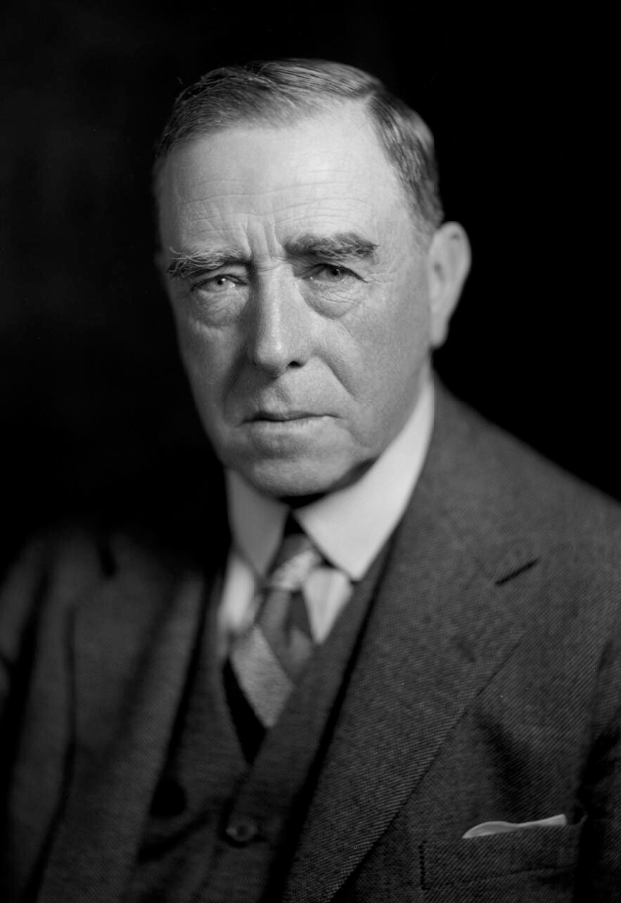

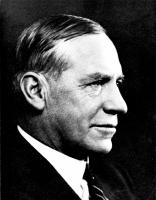

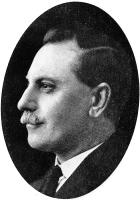
	First party	Second party	Third party
Leader	Sir Stanley Argyle	Murray Bourchier	Tom Tunnecliffe
Party	United Australia	United Country	Labor
Leader since	3 September 1930	27 June 1933	14 July 1932
Leader's seat	Toorak	Goulburn Valley	Collingwood
Last election	31 seats	14 seats	16 seats
Seats before	29 seats	17 seats	16 seats
Seats won	25 seats	20 seats	17 seats
Seat change	▼4	▲3	▲1
Percentage	36.17%	13.71%	37.93%
Swing	▼3.95	▲1.38	▲2.79
Premier before election
Sir Stanley Argyle
United Australia
Elected Premier
Sir Stanley Argyle
United Australia

The 1935 Victorian state election was held in the Australian state of Victoria on Saturday 2 March 1935 to elect 53 of the 65 members of the state's Legislative Assembly. 12 seats were uncontested.

== Background ==
At the 1932 state election, the United Australia Party won 31 seats, the United Country Party won 16 seats, and the Australian Labor Party won 14 seats. Since the election the UAP had lost two seats to the UCP in by-elections: Benambra on 15 October 1932, and Gunbower on 1 May 1934.

On 16 May 1933, the UAP member for Waranga, Ernest Coyle, resigned from that party and defected to the UCP.

James Vinton Smith was unendorsed by the UAP at the time of the 1932 election, and won the seat of Oakleigh as an Independent, but was fully endorsed by the party at the 1935 election.

At the end of the Parliament, the United Australia Party held 29 seats (down from 31), the United Country Party held 19 seats (up from 16), and the ALP held 14 seats (unchanged).

== Results ==
=== Legislative Assembly ===
Victorian state election, 2 March 1935 Legislative Assembly << 1932–1937 >>
Enrolled voters	904,191				
Votes cast	853,470		Turnout	94.39	+0.19
Informal votes	14,150		Informal	1.65	+0.24
Summary of votes by party
Party	Primary votes	%	Swing	Seats	Change
Labor	318,390	37.93	+2.79	17	+1
United Australia	303,626	36.17	−3.95	25	−4
United Country	115,064	13.71	+1.38	20	+3
Communist	9,301	1.11	+0.97	0	±0
Independent	92,939	11.08	+1.37	3	±0
Total	839,320			65	

Notes:

- Twelve seats were uncontested at this election, and were retained by the incumbent parties:
  - UAP (4): Boroondara, Polwarth, Toorak, Upper Yarra
  - United Country (5): Benalla, Gippsland South, Goulburn Valley, Gunbower, Korong and Eaglehawk
  - Labor (2): Brunswick, Williamstown.
  - Independent (1): Port Fairy and Glenelg

== Subsequent events ==
The United Australia Party and the United Country Party had entered the election as a Coalition. The coalition won a comfortable majority, winning a total 44 seats in the 65 seat assembly. UAP leader Sir Stanley Argyle was confirmed as Premier, and formed what was known as the National Ministry, which included three members of the Country Party (Albert Dunstan, John Allan and George Goudie).

On 5 March, rumours began to appear which suggested that the Country Party would demand a greater proportion of the ministry, including the Deputy Premiership, four of the eight full portfolios and at least one Honorary Minister, and it was suggested that they would challenge the UAP on the floor of the Assembly if this was not granted.

On 15 March, the United Country Party overthrew leader Murray Bourchier, and replaced him with Albert Dunstan.

On 19 March, a joint conference of the Country Party's central council and the parliamentary party voted in a secret ballot to discontinue the party's association with Argyle's National Ministry, and Dunstan, Allan and Goudie resigned from Argyle's cabinet the next day.

At 10.30pm on Thursday 28 March, after a spirited sixteen-hour debate, Dunstan moved a motion of no confidence against Argyle's government. With the support of the Country Party, the Labor Party and three independents, the motion was carried on division by 40 votes to 23.

Argyle informed the Governor of Victoria, Lord Huntingfield, of his ministry's resignation on 29 March. The Governor sought a meeting with Dunstan, but postponed the decision to commission him as Premier until the following Tuesday (2 April), due to his doubts about Dunstan's ability to form a stable ministry with Labor support. Dunstan was appointed Premier on 2 April 1935 and formed a minority Country Party government with Labor Party support in return for some legislative concessions. This Country-Labor minority government would last until 1943.

== See also ==
- Candidates of the 1935 Victorian state election
- 1934 Victorian Legislative Council election
