= List of elections in Victoria =

This is a list of state elections in Victoria for the bicameral Parliament of Victoria, Australia. Consisting of the House of Assembly (lower house) and the Legislative Council (upper house).

No =	Parliament number
MLA =	Members of the Victorian Legislative Assembly, yyyy–zzzz
MLC =	Members of the Victorian Legislative Council, yyyy–zzzz

No	Election date/year	Candidates	MLA	MLC	Results	Pendulum
60	26 November 2022	candidates	MLA	MLC	Results: Legislative Assembly; Legislative Council	Pendulum
59	24 November 2018	candidates	MLA	MLC	Results: Legislative Assembly; Legislative Council	Pendulum
58	29 November 2014	candidates	MLA	MLC	Results: Legislative Assembly; Legislative Council	Pendulum
57	27 November 2010	candidates	MLA	MLC	Results: Legislative Assembly; Legislative Council	Pendulum
56	25 November 2006	candidates	MLA	MLC	Results: Legislative Assembly, Legislative Council	Pendulum
55	30 November 2002	candidates	MLA	MLC	Results: Legislative Assembly, Legislative Council	Pendulum
54	18 September 1999	candidates	MLA	MLC	Results: Legislative Assembly, Legislative Council	Pendulum
53	30 March 1996	candidates	MLA	MLC	Results: Legislative Assembly, Legislative Council	Pendulum
52	3 October 1992	candidates	MLA	MLC	Results: Legislative Assembly, Legislative Council	Pendulum
51	1 October 1988	candidates	MLA	MLC	Results: Legislative Assembly, Legislative Council	Pendulum
50	2 March 1985	candidates	MLA	MLC	Results: Legislative Assembly, Legislative Council	Pendulum
49	3 April 1982	candidates	MLA	MLC	Results: Legislative Assembly, Legislative Council	Pendulum
48	5 May 1979	candidates	MLA	MLC	Results: Legislative Assembly, Legislative Council	Pendulum
47	20 March 1976	candidates	MLA	MLC	Results: Legislative Assembly, Legislative Council	Pendulum
46	19 May 1973	candidates	MLA	MLC	Results: Legislative Assembly, Legislative Council	Pendulum
45	30 May 1970	candidates	MLA	MLC	Results: Legislative Assembly, Legislative Council	Pendulum
44	29 April 1967	candidates	MLA	MLC	Results: Legislative Assembly, Legislative Council	Pendulum
43	27 June 1964	candidates	MLA	MLC	Results	Pendulum
42	15 July 1961	candidates	MLA	MLC	Results	Pendulum
41	31 May 1958	candidates	MLA	MLC	Results	Pendulum
40	28 May 1955	candidates	MLA	MLC	Results	Pendulum
39	6 December 1952	candidates	MLA	MLC	Results	Pendulum
38	13 May 1950	candidates	MLA		Results	Pendulum
	1949	candidates		MLC	Results	Pendulum
37	8 November 1947	candidates	MLA		Results	Pendulum
	1946	candidates		MLC	Results	Pendulum
36	10 November 1945	candidates	MLA		Results	Pendulum
35	12 June 1943	candidates	MLA	MLC	Results	Pendulum
34	16 March 1940	candidates	MLA	MLC	Results	Pendulum
33	2 October 1937	candidates	MLA	MLC	Results	Pendulum
32	2 March 1935	candidates	MLA		Results	Pendulum
	1934	candidates		MLC	Results	Pendulum
31	14 May 1932	candidates	MLA		Results	Pendulum
	1931	candidates		MLC	Results	Pendulum
30	30 November 1929	candidates	MLA		Results	Pendulum
29	2 June 1928	candidates		MLC	Results	Pendulum
28	Saturday; 9 April 1927	candidates	MLA		Results	Pendulum
	4 June 1925	candidates		MLC	Results	Pendulum
27	Thursday; 26 June 1924	candidates	MLA		Results	Pendulum
26	Tuesday; 30 August 1921	candidates	MLA		Results	Pendulum
25	Thursday; 21 October 1920	candidates	MLA		Results	Pendulum
24	Thursday; 15 November 1917	candidates	MLA		Results	Pendulum
23	Thursday; 26 November 1914	candidates	MLA		Results	Pendulum
22	16 November 1911	candidates	MLA		Results	Pendulum
21	29 December 1908	candidates	MLA		Results	Pendulum
20	Friday, 15 March 1907	candidates	MLA		Results	Pendulum
19	1 June 1904	candidates	MLA		Results	Pendulum
18	1 October 1902	candidates	MLA		Results	Pendulum
17	1 November 1900	candidates	MLA		Results	Pendulum
16	14 October 1897	candidates	MLA		Results	Pendulum
15	20 September 1894	candidates	MLA		Results	Pendulum
14	20 April 1892	candidates	MLA		Results	Pendulum
13	28 March 1889	candidates	MLA		Results	Pendulum
12	5 March 1886	candidates	MLA		Results	Pendulum
11	23 February 1883	candidates	MLA		Results	Pendulum
	14 July 1880	candidates	MLA		Results	Pendulum
	20 March – 14 July 1880	candidates		MLC	Results	Pendulum
10	28 February 1880	candidates	MLA		Results	Pendulum
	17 August – 16 September 1878	candidates		MLC	Results	Pendulum
9	11 May 1877	candidates	MLA		Results	Pendulum
8	25 March; 9, 22 April 1874	candidates	MLA		Results	Pendulum
7	14 February; 3, 16 March 1871	candidates	MLA		Results	Pendulum
6	21 January; 7, 20 February 1868	candidates	MLA		Results	Pendulum
5	30 December 1865, 15 and 29 January 1866	candidates	MLA		Results	Pendulum
4	5 & 21 October; 3 November 1864	candidates	MLA		Results	Pendulum
3	2–19 August 1861	candidates	MLA		Results	Pendulum
2	26 August – 26 September 1859	candidates	MLA		Results	Pendulum
1	23 September – 24 October 1856	candidates	MLA		Results	Pendulum

== See also ==
- Electoral districts of Victoria
- Members of the Victorian Legislative Assembly
- Members of the Victorian Legislative Council
- Timeline of Australian elections
