= Members of the Victorian Legislative Assembly, 1908–1911 =

- ←1907–1908 1911–1914→

This is a list of members of the Victorian Legislative Assembly as elected at the 29 December 1908 election and subsequent by-elections up to the election of 16 November 1911.

Note the "Term in Office" refers to that members term(s) in the Assembly, not necessarily for that electorate.

Name	Party	Electorate	Term in Office
Frank Anstey ^{[a]}	Labor	Brunswick	1902–1910
Reginald Argyle	Anti-Socialist	Dalhousie	1900–1914
Samuel Barnes ^{[c]}	VFU	Walhalla	1910–1927
Norman Bayles	Anti-Socialist	Toorak	1906–1920
William Beazley	Labor	Abbotsford	1889–1912
Thomas Bent ^{[b]}	Anti-Socialist / Reform	Brighton	1871–1894; 1900–1909
Alfred Billson	Anti-Socialist	Ovens	1901–1902; 1904–1927
John Billson	Labor	Fitzroy	1900–1924
John Bowser	Anti-Socialist	Wangaratta	1894–1929
Ewen Hugh Cameron	Anti-Socialist	Evelyn	1874–1914
James Cameron	Anti-Socialist	Gippsland East	1902–1920
Hugh Campbell	Anti-Socialist	Glenelg	1906–1920
John Carlisle	Anti-Socialist	Benalla	1903–1927
George Cookson	Anti-Socialist	Upper Goulburn	1908–1911
Ted Cotter	Labor	Richmond	1908–1945
Albert Craven	Anti-Socialist	Benambra	1889–1913
John Cullen	Anti-Socialist	Gunbower	1901–1911
Martin Cussen	Anti-Socialist	Waranga	1908–1911
Alfred Downward	Anti-Socialist	Mornington	1894–1929
George Elmslie	Labor	Albert Park	1902–1918
James Farrer	Anti-Socialist	Barwon	1906–1917
Charles Forrest	Anti-Socialist	Polwarth	1886–1894; 1897–1911
Thomas Glass	Labor	Bendigo East	1907–1911
George Graham	Anti-Socialist	Goulburn Valley	1884–1914
John Gray	Anti-Socialist	Swan Hill	1904–1917
Martin Hannah	Labor	Collingwood	1904–1906; 1908–1921
Albert Harris ^{[c]}	Anti-Socialist	Walhalla	1883–1910
George Holden	Independent	Warrenheip	1900–1913
William Hutchinson	Anti-Socialist	Borung	1902–1920
James Jewell ^{[a]}	Labor	Brunswick	1910–1949
William Keast	Independent	Dandenong	1900–1917
Thomas Langdon	Anti-Socialist	Korong	1880–1889; 1892–1914
Harry Lawson	Anti-Socialist	Castlemaine and Maldon	1900–1928
John Lemmon	Labor	Williamstown	1904–1955
Thomas Livingston	Anti-Socialist	Gippsland South	1902–1922
Peter McBride	Anti-Socialist	Kara Kara	1897–1913
Robert McCutcheon	Anti-Socialist	St Kilda	1902–1917
Charles McGrath	Labor	Grenville	1904–1913
Robert McGregor	Anti-Socialist	Ballarat East	1894–1924
Hugh McKenzie	Anti-Socialist	Rodney	1904–1917
John Mackey	Anti-Socialist	Gippsland West	1902–1924
Donald Mackinnon	Anti-Socialist	Prahran	1900–1920
Andrew McKissock	Labor	Ballarat West	1908–1911
James Weir McLachlan	Labor	Gippsland North	1908–1938
Donald McLeod	Anti-Socialist	Daylesford	1900–1923
Frank Madden	Anti-Socialist	Boroondara	1894–1917
James Membrey	Labor	Jika Jika	1907–1917
John Murray	Independent	Warrnambool	1884–1916
David Oman	Anti-Socialist	Hampden	1900–1927
Alfred Richard Outtrim	Labor	Maryborough	1885–1902; 1904–1920
Alexander Peacock	Anti-Socialist	Allandale	1889–1933
William Plain	Labor	Geelong	1908–1917
George Prendergast	Labor	North Melbourne	1894–1897; 1900–1926; 1927–1937
Andrew Robertson	Anti-Socialist	Bulla	1903–1924
Alexander Rogers	Labor	Melbourne	1908–1924
George Sangster	Labor	Port Melbourne	1894–1915
David Smith	Labor	Bendigo West	1904–1924
Oswald Snowball ^{[b]}	Comm. Liberal	Brighton	1909–1928
Robert Solly	Labor	Carlton	1904–1906; 1908–1932
George Swinburne	Anti-Socialist	Hawthorn	1902–1913
Robert Stanley	Anti-Socialist	Lowan	1900–1904; 1906–1911
John Thomson	Anti-Socialist	Dundas	1892–1900; 1902–1914
Richard Toutcher	Independent	Stawell and Ararat	1897–1935
Tom Tunnecliffe	Labor	Eaglehawk	1903–1904; 1907–1920; 1921–1947
Jeremiah Wall	Labor	Port Fairy	1908–1911
Edward Warde	Labor	Flemington	1900–1925
William Watt	Independent	Essendon	1897–1900; 1902–1914
Henry Weedon	Anti-Socialist	East Melbourne	1907–1911

^{[a]} Anstey resigned in February 1910; replaced by James Jewell in March 1910.
^{[b]} Bent died 17 September 1909; replaced by Oswald Snowball in October 1909.
^{[c]} Harris died 5 July 1910; replaced by Samuel Barnes in July 1910.
