= Members of the Victorian Legislative Assembly, 1907–1908 =

- ←1904–1907 1908–1911→

This is a list of members of the Victorian Legislative Assembly as elected at the 15 March 1907 election and subsequent by-elections up to the election of 29 December 1908.

Note the "Term in Office" refers to that members term(s) in the Assembly, not necessarily for that electorate.

21st Parliament
| Name | Party | Electorate | Term in Office |
|---|---|---|---|
| Frank Anstey | Labor | Brunswick | 1902–1910 |
| Reginald Argyle | Anti-Socialist | Dalhousie | 1900–1914 |
| Norman Bayles | Anti-Socialist | Toorak | 1906–1920 |
| William Beazley | Labor | Abbotsford | 1889–1912 |
| George Bennett ^{[a]} | | Richmond | 1889–1908 |
| Thomas Bent | Anti-Socialist / Reform | Brighton | 1871–1894; 1900–1909 |
| Alfred Billson | Anti-Socialist | Ovens | 1901–1902; 1904–1927 |
| John Billson | Labor | Fitzroy | 1900–1924 |
| John Bowser | Anti-Socialist | Wangaratta | 1894–1929 |
| James Boyd | non-Labor | Melbourne | 1901–1908 |
| Frederick Bromley ^{[b]} | | Carlton | 1892–1908 |
| Ewen Hugh Cameron | Anti-Socialist | Evelyn | 1874–1914 |
| James Cameron | Anti-Socialist | Gippsland East | 1902–1920 |
| Hugh Campbell | Anti-Socialist | Glenelg | 1906–1920 |
| John Carlisle | Anti-Socialist | Benalla | 1903–1927 |
| Albert Craven | Anti-Socialist | Benambra | 1889–1913 |
| John Cullen | Anti-Socialist | Gunbower | 1901–1911 |
| Alfred Downward | Anti-Socialist | Mornington | 1894–1929 |
| James Francis Duffus | | Port Fairy | 1894–1908; 1911–1914 |
| George Elmslie | Labor | Albert Park | 1902–1918 |
| James Farrer | Anti-Socialist | Barwon | 1906–1917 |
| Charles Forrest | Anti-Socialist | Polwarth | 1886–1894; 1897–1911 |
| Thomas Glass | Labor | Bendigo East | 1907–1911 |
| George Graham | Anti-Socialist | Goulburn Valley | 1884–1914 |
| John Gray | Anti-Socialist | Swan Hill | 1904–1917 |
| William Gurr | | Geelong | 1894–1902; 1907–1908 |
| Albert Harris | Anti-Socialist | Walhalla | 1883–1910 |
| George Holden | Independent | Warrenheip | 1900–1913 |
| Thomas Hunt | | Upper Goulburn | 1874–1892; 1903–1908 |
| William Hutchinson | Anti-Socialist | Borung | 1902–1920 |
| William Keast | Independent | Dandenong | 1900–1917 |
| Hubert Patrick Keogh | | Gippsland North | 1901–1908 |
| Joseph Kirton | | Ballarat West | 1889–1894; 1894–1904; 1907–1908 |
| Thomas Langdon | Anti-Socialist | Korong | 1880–1889; 1892–1914 |
| Harry Lawson | Anti-Socialist | Castlemaine and Maldon | 1900–1928 |
| John Lemmon | Labor | Williamstown | 1904–1955 |
| Thomas Livingston | Anti-Socialist | Gippsland South | 1902–1922 |
| Peter McBride | Anti-Socialist | Kara Kara | 1897–1913 |
| Robert McCutcheon | Anti-Socialist | St Kilda | 1902–1917 |
| Charles McGrath | Labor | Grenville | 1904–1913 |
| Robert McGregor | Anti-Socialist | Ballarat East | 1894–1924 |
| Hugh McKenzie | Anti-Socialist | Rodney | 1904–1917 |
| John Mackey | Anti-Socialist | Gippsland West | 1902–1924 |
| Donald Mackinnon | Anti-Socialist | Prahran | 1900–1920 |
| Donald McLeod | Anti-Socialist | Daylesford | 1900–1923 |
| Frank Madden | Anti-Socialist | Boroondara | 1894–1917 |
| John Walker Mason | | Waranga | 1897–1902; 1907–1908 |
| James Membrey | Labor | Jika Jika | 1907–1917 |
| John Murray | Independent | Warrnambool | 1884–1916 |
| David Oman | Anti-Socialist | Hampden | 1900–1927 |
| Alfred Richard Outtrim | Labor | Maryborough | 1885–1902; 1904–1920 |
| Alexander Peacock | Anti-Socialist | Allandale | 1889–1933 |
| George Prendergast | Labor | North Melbourne | 1894–1897; 1900–1926; 1927–1937 |
| Andrew Robertson | Anti-Socialist | Bulla | 1903–1924 |
| George Sangster | Labor | Port Melbourne | 1894–1915 |
| David Smith | Labor | Bendigo West | 1904–1924 |
| Robert Stanley | Anti-Socialist | Lowan | 1900–1904; 1906–1911 |
| George Swinburne | Anti-Socialist | Hawthorn | 1902–1913 |
| John Thomson | Anti-Socialist | Dundas | 1892–1900; 1902–1914 |
| Richard Toutcher | Independent | Stawell and Ararat | 1897–1935 |
| Tom Tunnecliffe | Labor | Eaglehawk | 1903–1904; 1907–1920; 1921–1947 |
| Edward Warde | Labor | Flemington | 1900–1925 |
| William Watt | Independent | Essendon | 1897–1900; 1902–1914 |
| Henry Weedon | Anti-Socialist | East Melbourne | 1907–1911 |
| Edgar Wilkins | | Collingwood | 1892–1908 |

Thomas Bent was Premier, Treasurer and Minister for Railways. Frank Madden was Speaker, Albert Craven was Chairman of Committees.

^{[a]} Bennett died 8 September 1908; replaced by Ted Cotter in October 1908.
^{[b]} Bromley died 29 September 1908; replaced by Robert Solly in October 1908.
