= Members of the Victorian Legislative Assembly, 1921–1924 =

- ←1920–1921 1924–1927→

This is a list of members of the Victorian Legislative Assembly from 6 September 1921 to 28 May 1924, as elected at the 1921 state election and subsequent by-elections:

Name	Party	Electorate	Term in office
John Allan	VFU	Rodney	1917–1936
David Allison	VFU	Borung	1920–1927
Hon Henry Angus	Nationalist	Gunbower	1911–1934
Hon Stanley Argyle	Nationalist	Toorak	1920–1940
Hon Henry Bailey	Labor	Port Fairy	1914–1932; 1935–1950
Hon Matthew Baird	Nationalist	Ballarat West	1911–1927
Samuel Barnes	VFU	Walhalla	1910–1927
Henry Beardmore	Nationalist	Benambra	1917–1932
Alfred Billson	Nationalist	Ovens	1901–1902; 1904–1927
John Billson	Labor	Fitzroy	1900–1924
Hon Murray Bourchier	VFU	Goulburn Valley	1920–1936
Hon John Bowser	VFU	Wangaratta	1894–1929
William Brownbill	Labor	Geelong	1920–1932; 1935–1938
John Cain	Labor	Jika Jika	1917–1957
Allan Cameron ^{[3]}	Nationalist	Dalhousie	1914–1923
John Carlisle	VFU	Benalla	1903–1927
Luke Clough	Labor	Bendigo East	1915–1927
Ted Cotter	Labor	Richmond	1908–1945
James Deany	Nationalist	Warrnambool	1916–1927
Alfred Downward	VFU	Mornington	1894–1929
Albert Dunstan	VFU	Eaglehawk	1920–1950
Frederic Eggleston	Nationalist	St Kilda	1920–1927
William Everard	Nationalist	Evelyn	1917–1950
Alfred Farthing	Nationalist	East Melbourne	1911–1927
Richard Fetherston	Nationalist	Prahran	1921–1924
George Frost	Labor	Maryborough	1920–1942
John Gordon	Nationalist	Waranga	1911–1927
Edmund Greenwood	Nationalist	Boroondara	1917–1929
Frank Groves	Nationalist	Dandenong	1917–1929; 1932–1937
Hon Edmond Hogan	Labor	Warrenheip	1913–1943
Arthur Hughes	Labor	Grenville	1921–1929
James Jewell	Labor	Brunswick	1910–1949
Hon Harry Lawson	Nationalist	Castlemaine and Maldon	1900–1928
Hon John Lemmon	Labor	Williamstown	1904–1955
Albert Lind	VFU	Gippsland East	1920–1961
Thomas Livingston ^{[1]}	Nationalist	Gippsland South	1902–1922
Hon Sir John Mackey ^{[4]}	Nationalist	Gippsland West	1902–1924
Hon Edwin Mackrell	VFU	Upper Goulburn	1920–1945
James McDonald	Nationalist	Polwarth	1917–1933
James McDonald ^{[2]}	Labor	Daylesford	1923; 1924–1927
Hon Robert McGregor	Nationalist	Ballarat East	1894–1924
James McLachlan	Independent	Gippsland North	1908–1938
Donald McLeod ^{[2]}	Nationalist	Daylesford	1900–1923
Roderick McLeod ^{[2]}	Nationalist	Daylesford	1923–1924
Hon William McPherson	Nationalist	Hawthorn	1913–1930
Edward Morley	Nationalist	Barwon	1920–1929
James Murphy	Labor	Port Melbourne	1917–1942
Francis Old	VFU	Swan Hill	1919–1945
Hon David Oman	Nationalist	Hampden	1900–1927
Hon Sir Alexander Peacock	Nationalist	Allandale	1889–1933
Hon John Pennington	Nationalist	Kara Kara	1913–1917; 1918–1935
Reg Pollard ^{[3]}	Labor	Dalhousie	1924–1932
Hon George Prendergast	Labor	North Melbourne	1894–1897; 1900–1926; 1927–1937
Hon Andrew Robertson	Nationalist	Bulla	1903–1924
Alexander Rogers	Labor	Melbourne	1908–1924
Thomas Ryan	Nationalist	Essendon	1917–1924
William Slater	Labor	Dundas	1917–1932; 1932–1947
David Smith	Nationalist	Bendigo West	1904–1924
Oswald Snowball	Nationalist	Brighton	1909–1928
Robert Solly	Labor	Carlton	1904–1906; 1908–1932
William Thomas	Labor	Glenelg	1920–1924
Richard Toutcher	Nationalist	Stawell and Ararat	1897–1935
Tom Tunnecliffe	Labor	Collingwood	1903–1904; 1907–1920; 1921–1947
Arthur Wallace	Nationalist	Albert Park	1919–1927; 1929–1932
Arthur Walter ^{[4]}	VFU	Gippsland West	1924–1929
Edward Warde	Labor	Flemington	1900–1925
Isaac Weaver	VFU	Korong	1917–1927
Gordon Webber	Labor	Abbotsford	1912–1932
Walter West ^{[1]}	Nationalist	Gippsland South	1922–1927; 1927–1929
Marcus Wettenhall	VFU	Lowan	1920–1935

^{1} On 13 July 1922, the Nationalist member for Gippsland South, Thomas Livingston, died. Nationalist candidate Walter West won the resulting by-election on 18 August 1922.
^{2} On 8 July 1923, the Nationalist member for Daylesford, Donald McLeod, died. Labor candidate James McDonald won the resulting by-election on 9 August 1923, but was defeated in a September recount by Donald McLeod's son Roderick McLeod.
^{3} On 28 December 1923, the Nationalist member for Dalhousie, Allan Cameron, died. Labor candidate Reg Pollard won the resulting by-election on 31 January 1924.
^{4} On 6 April 1924, the Nationalist member for Gippsland West, Sir John Mackey, died. Victorian Farmers Union candidate Arthur Walter won the resulting by-election on 23 May 1924.

== Sources ==
- "Find a Member". State Government of Victoria.
