= Members of the Victorian Legislative Assembly, 1911–1914 =

- ←1908–1911 1914–1917→

This is a list of members of the Victorian Legislative Assembly as elected at the 16 November 1911 election and subsequent by-elections up to the election of 15 November 1914:

Note the "Term in Office" refers to that members term(s) in the Assembly, not necessarily for that electorate.

Name	Party	Electorate	Term in Office
Henry Angus	Comm. Liberal	Gunbower	1911–1934
Reginald Argyle	Comm. Liberal	Dalhousie	1900–1914
Matthew Baird	Comm. Liberal	Ballarat West	1911–1927
Samuel Barnes	VFU	Walhalla	1910–1927
Norman Bayles	—	Toorak	1906–1920
William Beazley ^{[a]}	Labor	Abbotsford	1889–1912
Alfred Billson	—	Ovens	1901–1902; 1904–1927
John Billson	Labor	Fitzroy	1900–1924
John Bowser	VFU	Wangaratta	1894–1929
Ewen Hugh Cameron	Comm Liberal	Evelyn	1874–1914
James Cameron	Comm. Liberal	Gippsland East	1902–1920
Hugh Campbell	Comm. Liberal	Glenelg	1906–1920
John Carlisle	VFU	Benalla	1903–1927
John Chatham ^{[e]}	Labor	Grenville	1913–1917
Ted Cotter	Labor	Richmond	1908–1945
Albert Craven ^{[b]}	—	Benambra	1889–1913
Alfred Downward	VFU	Mornington	1894–1929
James Francis Duffus	—	Port Fairy	1894–1908; 1911–1914
George Elmslie	Labor	Albert Park	1902–1918
James Farrer	Comm. Liberal	Barwon	1906–1917
Alfred Farthing	Comm. Liberal	East Melbourne	1911–1927
John Gordon	Comm. Liberal	Waranga	1911–1927
George Graham	—	Goulburn Valley	1884–1914
John Gray	Comm. Liberal	Swan Hill	1904–1917
Alfred Hampson	Labor	Bendigo East	1911–1915
Martin Hannah	Labor	Collingwood	1904–1906; 1908–1921
Edmond Hogan ^{[c]}	Labor	Warrenheip	1913–1943
George Holden ^{[c]}	—	Warrenheip	1900–1913
William Hutchinson	Comm. Liberal	Borung	1902–1920
James Jewell	Labor	Brunswick	1910–1949
John Johnstone	Comm. Liberal	Polwarth	1911–1917
William Keast	Ministerial / Comm. Liberal	Dandenong	1900–1917
Thomas Langdon	Ministerial	Korong	1880–1889; 1892–1914
Harry Lawson	—	Castlemaine and Maldon	1900–1928
John Leckie ^{[b]}	Comm. Liberal	Benambra	1913–1917
John Lemmon	Labor	Williamstown	1904–1955
Thomas Livingston	Comm. Liberal	Gippsland South	1902–1922
Peter McBride ^{[d]}	Comm. Liberal	Kara Kara	1897–1913
Robert McCutcheon	Ministerialist / Comm. Liberal	St Kilda	1902–1917
Charles McGrath ^{[e]}	Labor	Grenville	1904–1913
Robert McGregor	Comm. Liberal	Ballarat East	1894–1924
Hugh McKenzie	Comm. Liberal	Rodney	1904–1917
Malcolm McKenzie	—	Upper Goulburn	1892–1903; 1911–1920
John Mackey	Comm. Liberal	Gippsland West	1902–1924
Donald Mackinnon	Liberal	Prahran	1900–1920
James Weir McLachlan	Independent	Gippsland North	1908–1938
Donald McLeod	—	Daylesford	1900–1923
William Murray McPherson ^{[f]}	Comm. Liberal	Hawthorn	1913–1930
Frank Madden	—	Boroondara	1894–1917
James Membrey	Labor	Jika Jika	1907–1917
James Menzies	Comm. Liberal	Lowan	1911–1920
John Murray	Comm. Liberal	Warrnambool	1884–1916
David Oman	Comm. Liberal	Hampden	1900–1927
Alfred Richard Outtrim	Labor	Maryborough	1885–1902; 1904–1920
Alexander Peacock	Comm. Liberal	Allandale	1889–1933
John Pennington ^{[d]}	Comm. Liberal	Kara Kara	1913–1917; 1918–1935
William Plain	Labor	Geelong	1908–1917
George Prendergast	Labor	North Melbourne	1894–1897; 1900–1926; 1927–1937
Andrew Robertson	Comm. Liberal	Bulla	1903–1924
Alexander Rogers	Labor	Melbourne	1908–1924
George Sangster	Labor	Port Melbourne	1894–1915
David Smith	Labor	Bendigo West	1904–1924
Oswald Snowball	Comm. Liberal	Brighton	1909–1928
Robert Solly	Labor	Carlton	1904–1906; 1908–1932
George Swinburne ^{[f]}	Comm. Liberal	Hawthorn	1902–1913
John Thomson	Comm. Liberal	Dundas	1892–1900; 1902–1914
Richard Toutcher	Comm. Liberal	Stawell and Ararat	1897–1935
Tom Tunnecliffe	Labor	Eaglehawk	1903–1904; 1907–1920; 1921–1947
Edward Warde	Labor	Flemington	1900–1925
William Watt	Comm. Liberal	Essendon	1897–1900; 1902–1914
Gordon Webber ^{[a]}	Labor	Abbotsford	1912–1932

^{[a]} Beazley died 28 June 1912; replaced by Gordon Webber in July 1912.
^{[b]} Craven died 28 November 1913; replaced by John Leckie
^{[c]} Holden resigned in February 1913; replaced by Edmond Hogan the same month.
^{[d]} McBride resigned in February 1913; replaced by John Pennington in March 1913.
^{[e]} McGrath resigned in April 1913; replaced by John Chatham in May 1913.
^{[f]} Swinburne resigned July 1913; replaced by William Murray McPherson in September 1913.
