= Members of the Victorian Legislative Assembly, 1914–1917 =

- ←1911–1914 1917–1920→

This is a list of members of the Victorian Legislative Assembly as elected at the 15 November 1914 election and subsequent by-elections up to the election of 15 November 1917:

Name	Party	Electorate	Term in Office
Henry Angus	Comm. Liberal / Nationalist	Gunbower	1911–1934
Henry Bailey	Labor	Port Fairy	1914–1932; 1935–1950
Matthew Baird	Comm. Liberal / Economy / Nationalist	Ballarat West	1911–1927
Samuel Barnes	Comm. Liberal / Nationalist	Walhalla	1910–1927
Norman Bayles	Nationalist / Economy	Toorak	1906–1920
Alfred Billson	Nationalist / Economy	Ovens	1901–1902; 1904–1927
John Billson	Labor	Fitzroy	1900–1924
Maurice Blackburn	Labor	Essendon	1914–1917; 1925–1934
John Bowser	Nationalist / Economy	Wangaratta	1894–1929
Allan Cameron	Comm. Liberal / Nationalist	Dalhousie	1914–1923
James Cameron	Comm. Liberal / Nationalist	Gippsland East	1902–1920
Hugh Campbell	Comm. Liberal / Nationalist	Glenelg	1906–1920
John Carlisle	Comm. Liberal / Nationalist / Economy	Benalla	1903–1927
John Chatham	Labor	Grenville	1913–1917
Ted Cotter	Labor	Richmond	1908–1945
Alfred Downward	Unaligned	Mornington	1894–1929
George Elmslie	Labor	Albert Park	1902–1918
James Farrer	Comm. Liberal / Nationalist / Economy	Barwon	1906–1917
Alfred Farthing	Comm. Liberal / Nationalist	East Melbourne	1911–1927
John Gordon	Comm. Liberal / Nationalist/ Economy	Waranga	1911–1927
Achilles Gray	Comm. Liberal / Nationalist	Korong	1914–1917
John Gray	Comm. Liberal / Nationalist	Swan Hill	1904–1917
Alfred Hampson ^{[a]}	Labor	Bendigo East	1911–1915
Martin Hannah	Labor	Collingwood	1904–1906; 1908–1921
Edmond Hogan	Labor	Warrenheip	1913–1943
William Hutchinson	Comm. Liberal / Nationalist	Borung	1902–1920
James Jewell	Labor	Brunswick	1910–1949
John Johnstone ^{[b]}	Comm. Liberal	Polwarth	1911–1917
William Keast	Ministerial / Comm. Liberal	Dandenong	1900–1917
Harry Lawson	Nationalist	Castlemaine and Maldon	1900–1928
John Leckie ^{[c]}	Nationalist	Benambra	1913–1917
John Lemmon	Labor	Williamstown	1904–1955
Thomas Livingston	Comm. Liberal / Nationalist	Gippsland South	1902–1922
Robert McCutcheon	Ministerialist / Comm. Liberal	St Kilda	1902–1917
Robert McGregor	Comm. Liberal / Nationalist	Ballarat East	1894–1924
Hugh McKenzie	Comm. Liberal / Nationalist	Rodney	1904–1917
Malcolm McKenzie	Unaligned	Upper Goulburn	1892–1903; 1911–1920
John Mackey	Comm. Liberal / Nationalist / Economy	Gippsland West	1902–1924
Donald Mackinnon	Liberal	Prahran	1900–1920
James McLachlan	Independent	Gippsland North	1908–1938
Donald McLeod	Nationalist	Daylesford	1900–1923
William McPherson	Comm. Liberal / Nationalist / Economy	Hawthorn	1913–1930
Frank Madden	Comm. Liberal / Nationalist	Boroondara	1894–1917
James Membrey	Comm. Liberal / Nationalist	Jika Jika	1907–1917
James Menzies	Comm. Liberal / Nationalist	Lowan	1911–1920
John Mitchell	Comm. Liberal / Nationalist	Goulburn Valley	1914–1920
John Murray ^{[d]}	Comm. Liberal	Warrnambool	1884–1916
David Oman	Comm. Liberal / Nationalist	Hampden	1900–1927
Alfred Outtrim	Labor	Maryborough	1904–1920
Alexander Peacock	Comm. Liberal / Nationalist	Allandale	1889–1933
John Pennington	Comm. Liberal / Nationalist	Kara Kara	1913–1917; 1918–1935
William Plain ^{[e]}	Labor / Nationalist	Geelong	1908–1917
George Prendergast	Labor	North Melbourne	1894–1897; 1900–1926; 1927–1937
Andrew Robertson	Comm. Liberal / Nationalist / Economy	Bulla	1903–1924
Alexander Rogers	Labor	Melbourne	1908–1924
James Rouget	Comm. Liberal / Nationalist	Evelyn	1914–1917
George Sangster ^{[f]}	Labor	Port Melbourne	1894–1915
David Smith	Labor	Bendigo West	1904–1924
William Kennedy Smith	Comm. Liberal / Nationalist	Dundas	1914–1917
Oswald Snowball	Comm. Liberal / Nationalist	Brighton	1909–1928
Robert Solly	Labor	Carlton	1904–1906; 1908–1932
Richard Toutcher	Comm. Liberal / Nationalist	Stawell and Ararat	1904–1935
Tom Tunnecliffe	Labor	Eaglehawk	1903–1904; 1907–1920; 1921–1947
Edward Warde	Labor	Flemington	1900–1925
Gordon Webber	Labor	Abbotsford	1912–1932

^{[a]} Hampson resigned in January 1915; replaced by Luke Clough in February 1915.
^{[b]} Johnstone resigned in June 1917; replaced by James McDonald in July 1917.
^{[c]} Leckie resigned in March 1917; replaced by Henry Beardmore in April 1917.
^{[d]} Murray died 4 May 1916, replaced by James Deany in June 1916.
^{[e]} Plain resigned in March 1917 to contest a Senate seat in the federal election; he was replaced by Robert Purnell in August 1917.
^{[f]} Sangster died 8 April 1915; replaced by Owen Sinclair in April 1915.
