= Members of the Victorian Legislative Assembly, 1917–1920 =

- ←1914–1917 1920–1921→

This is a list of members of the Victorian Legislative Assembly as elected at the 15 November 1917 election and subsequent by-elections up to the election of 6 August 1920:

Name	Party	Electorate	Term in Office
John Allan	VFU	Rodney	1917–1936
Henry Angus	Nationalist	Gunbower	1911–1934
Henry Bailey	Labor	Port Fairy	1914–1932; 1935–1950
Matthew Baird	Nationalist	Ballarat West	1911–1927
Samuel Barnes	Nationalist	Walhalla	1910–1927
Norman Bayles	Nationalist / Economy	Toorak	1906–1920
Henry Beardmore	Nationalist	Benambra	1917–1932
Alfred Billson	Nationalist	Ovens	1901–1902; 1904–1927
John Billson	Labor	Fitzroy	1900–1924
John Bowser	Nationalist / Economy	Wangaratta	1894–1929
John Cain	Labor	Jika Jika	1917–1957
Allan Cameron	Nationalist	Dalhousie	1914–1923
James Cameron	Nationalist	Gippsland East	1902–1920
Hugh Campbell	Nationalist	Glenelg	1906–1920
John Carlisle	Nationalist / Economy / VFU	Benalla	1903–1927
Luke Clough	Labor	Bendigo East	1915–1927
Ted Cotter	Labor	Richmond	1908–1945
James Deany	Nationalist	Warrnambool	1916–1927
Alfred Downward	Unaligned	Mornington	1894–1929
George Elmslie ^{[a]}	Labor	Albert Park	1902–1918
William Everard	Nationalist	Evelyn	1917–1950
Alfred Farthing	Nationalist	East Melbourne	1911–1927
David Gibson	VFU	Grenville	1917–1921
John Gordon	Nationalist	Waranga	1911–1927
Edmund Greenwood	Nationalist	Boroondara	1917–1929
Frank Groves	Nationalist	Dandenong	1917–1929; 1932–1937
John Hall ^{[b]}	VFU	Kara Kara	1917–1918
Martin Hannah	Labor	Collingwood	1904–1906; 1908–1921
Edmond Hogan	Labor	Warrenheip	1913–1943
William Hutchinson	Nationalist	Borung	1902–1920
James Jewell	Labor	Brunswick	1910–1949
Harry Lawson	Nationalist	Castlemaine and Maldon	1900–1928
John Lemmon	Labor	Williamstown	1904–1955
Thomas Livingston	Nationalist	Gippsland South	1902–1922
James McDonald	Nationalist	Polwarth	1917–1933
Robert McGregor	Nationalist	Ballarat East	1894–1924
Malcolm McKenzie	Nationalist	Upper Goulburn	1892–1903; 1911–1920
John Mackey	Nationalist	Gippsland West	1902–1924
Donald Mackinnon	Liberal	Prahran	1900–1920
James McLachlan	Independent	Gippsland North	1908–1938
Duncan McLennan	Nationalist / Economy	Barwon	1917–1920
Donald McLeod	Nationalist	Daylesford	1900–1923
William McPherson	Nationalist	Hawthorn	1913–1930
James Menzies	Nationalist	Lowan	1911–1920
John Mitchell	Nationalist	Goulburn Valley	1914–1920
James Murphy	Labor	Port Melbourne	1917–1942
David Oman	Nationalist	Hampden	1900–1927
Alfred Outtrim	Nationalist	Maryborough	1885–1902; 1904–1920
Alexander Peacock	Nationalist	Allandale	1889–1933
John Pennington ^{[b]}	Nationalist	Kara Kara	1913–1917; 1918–1935
George Prendergast	Labor	North Melbourne	1894–1897; 1900–1926; 1927–1937
Robert Purnell	Nationalist	Geelong	1917–1920
Andrew Robertson	Nationalist	Bulla	1903–1924
Alexander Rogers	Labor	Melbourne	1908–1924
Thomas Ryan	Nationalist	Essendon	1917–1924
Bill Slater	Labor	Dundas	1917–1932; 1932–1947
David Smith	Nationalist	Bendigo West	1904–1924
Oswald Snowball	Nationalist	Brighton	1909–1928
Robert Solly	Labor	Carlton	1904–1906; 1908–1932
Percy Stewart ^{[c]}	VFU	Swan Hill	1917–1919
Richard Toutcher	Nationalist	Stawell and Ararat	1897–1935
Tom Tunnecliffe	Labor	Eaglehawk	1903–1904; 1907–1920; 1921–1947
Edward Warde	Labor	Flemington	1900–1925
Isaac Weaver	VFU	Korong	1917–1927
Gordon Webber	Labor	Abbotsford	1912–1932
Agar Wynne	Unaligned	St Kilda	1917–1920

^{[a]} Elmslie died 11 May 1918; replaced by Joseph Hannan in June 1918; Hannan resigned in October 1919 to (unsuccessfully) contest the Federal seat of Fawkner; replaced by Arthur Wallace in November 1919.
^{[b]} John Hall was replaced by John Pennington in February 1918 after Pennington was declared elected by the Elections and Qualification Committee.
^{[c]} Stewart resigned in October 1919; replaced by Francis Old in November 1919.

== Sources ==
- "Find a Member". State Government of Victoria.
- Victoria Parliamentary Debates (Hansard), Session 1917–18 (PDF). Vol. 148. Melbourne: A. J. Mullett. 1918. Archived (PDF) from the original on 24 September 2015.
