= Members of the Victorian Legislative Assembly, 1920–1921 =

- ←1917–1920 1921–1924→

This is a list of members of the Victorian Legislative Assembly from 10 November 1920 to 6 August 1921, as elected at the 1920 state election:

Name	Party	Electorate	Term in office
John Allan	VFU	Rodney	1917–1936
David Allison	VFU	Borung	1920–1927
Hon Henry Angus	Nationalist	Gunbower	1911–1934
Stanley Argyle	Nationalist	Toorak	1920–1940
Henry Bailey	Labor	Port Fairy	1914–1932; 1935–1950
Hon Matthew Baird	Nationalist	Ballarat West	1911–1927
Samuel Barnes	Nationalist	Walhalla	1910–1927
Henry Beardmore	Nationalist	Benambra	1917–1932
Alfred Billson	Nationalist	Ovens	1901–1902; 1904–1927
John Billson	Labor	Fitzroy	1900–1924
Murray Bourchier	VFU	Goulburn Valley	1920–1936
Hon John Bowser	Nationalist / VFU	Wangaratta	1894–1929
William Brownbill	Labor	Geelong	1920–1932; 1935–1938
John Cain	Labor	Jika Jika	1917–1957
Allan Cameron	Nationalist	Dalhousie	1914–1923
John Carlisle	VFU	Benalla	1903–1927
Luke Clough	Labor	Bendigo East	1915–1927
Ted Cotter	Labor	Richmond	1908–1945
James Deany	Nationalist	Warrnambool	1916–1927
Alfred Downward	Unaligned	Mornington	1894–1929
Albert Dunstan	VFU	Eaglehawk	1920–1950
Frederic Eggleston	Nationalist	St Kilda	1920–1927
William Everard	Nationalist	Evelyn	1917–1950
Alfred Farthing	Nationalist	East Melbourne	1911–1927
George Frost	Labor	Maryborough	1920–1942
David Gibson	VFU	Grenville	1917–1921
John Gordon	Nationalist	Waranga	1911–1927
Edmund Greenwood	Nationalist	Boroondara	1917–1929
Frank Groves	Nationalist	Dandenong	1917–1929; 1932–1937
Martin Hannah	Labor	Collingwood	1904–1906; 1908–1921
Edmond Hogan	Labor	Warrenheip	1913–1943
James Jewell	Labor	Brunswick	1910–1949
Hon Harry Lawson	Nationalist	Castlemaine and Maldon	1900–1928
Hon John Lemmon	Labor	Williamstown	1904–1955
Albert Lind	VFU	Gippsland East	1920–1961
Thomas Livingston	Nationalist	Gippsland South	1902–1922
Hon (Sir) John Mackey	Nationalist	Gippsland West	1902–1924
Edwin Mackrell ^{[1]}	VFU	Upper Goulburn	1920–1945
James McDonald	Nationalist	Polwarth	1917–1933
Hon Robert McGregor	Nationalist	Ballarat East	1894–1924
James McLachlan	Independent	Gippsland North	1908–1938
Donald McLeod	Nationalist	Daylesford	1900–1923
Hon William McPherson	Nationalist	Hawthorn	1913–1930
Edward Morley	Ind. Nationalist	Barwon	1920–1929
James Murphy	Labor	Port Melbourne	1917–1942
Francis Old	VFU	Swan Hill	1919–1945
Hon David Oman	Nationalist	Hampden	1900–1927
Alexander Parker	Labor	Prahran	1920–1921
Hon Sir Alexander Peacock	Nationalist	Allandale	1889–1933
Hon John Pennington	Nationalist	Kara Kara	1913–1917; 1918–1935
Hon George Prendergast	Labor	North Melbourne	1894–1897; 1900–1926; 1927–1937
Hon Andrew Robertson	Nationalist	Bulla	1903–1924
Alexander Rogers	Labor	Melbourne	1908–1924
Thomas Ryan	Nationalist	Essendon	1917–1924
William Slater	Labor	Dundas	1917–1932; 1932–1947
David Smith	Nationalist	Bendigo West	1904–1924
Oswald Snowball	Nationalist	Brighton	1909–1928
Robert Solly	Labor	Carlton	1904–1906; 1908–1932
William Thomas	Labor	Glenelg	1920–1924
Richard Toutcher	Nationalist	Stawell and Ararat	1897–1935
Arthur Wallace	Nationalist	Albert Park	1919–1927; 1929–1932
Edward Warde	Labor	Flemington	1900–1925
Isaac Weaver	VFU	Korong	1917–1927
Gordon Webber	Labor	Abbotsford	1912–1932
Marcus Wettenhall	VFU	Lowan	1920–1935

^{1} On 13 December 1920, the Elections and Qualifications Committee of the Legislative Assembly declared the election of Edwin Mackrell to the seat of Upper Goulburn was void, as Mackrell had failed to properly nominate his candidacy in the specified time, and had committed other technical breaches. A by-election was held on 27 January 1921, at which Mackrell was nominated and retained the seat.

== Sources ==
- "Find a Member". State Government of Victoria.
- Victoria Parliamentary Debates (Hansard), Second Session 1920 (PDF). Vol. 156. Melbourne: A. J. Mullett. 1921.
