= Members of the Victorian Legislative Assembly, 1945–1947 =

- ←1943–1945 1947–1950→

This is a list of members of the Victorian Legislative Assembly from 1945 to 1947, as elected at the 1945 state election:

Name	Party	Electorate	Term in office
Henry Bailey	Country	Warrnambool	1914–1932, 1935–1950
Hon Bill Barry	Labor	Carlton	1932–1955
Matthew Bennett	Country	Gippsland West	1929–1950
Richard Brose	Country	Rodney	1944–1964
Fanny Brownbill	Labor	Geelong	1938–1948
Hon John Cain	Labor	Northcote	1917–1957
Frederick Cook	Country	Benalla	1936–1961
Tom Corrigan	Labor	Port Melbourne	1942–1952
Frank Crean	Labor	Albert Park	1945–1947; 1949–1951
Jack Cremean	Labor	Clifton Hill	1945–1949
Alexander Dennett	Liberal	Caulfield	1945–1955
Keith Dodgshun	Country	Rainbow	1938–1955
John Don	Liberal	Elsternwick	1945–1955
Arthur Drakeford Jr.	Labor	Essendon	1945–1947; 1955–1958
Hon Albert Dunstan	Country	Korong	1920–1950
Fred Edmunds	Liberal	Hawthorn	1945–1950
William Everard	Min./Liberal	Evelyn	1917–1950
Hon Frank Field	Labor	Dandenong	1937–1947
Hon Bill Galvin	Labor	Bendigo	1945–1955, 1958–1964
Robert Gardner	Independent	Ivanhoe	1945–1947
Louis Garlick	Labor	Mildura	1945–1947
Bob Gray	Labor	Box Hill	1943–1947; 1952–1955
Edward Guye	Country	Polwarth	1940–1958
Robert Bell Hamilton	Liberal	Toorak	1945–1948
Hon Tom Hayes	Labor	Melbourne	1924–1955
John Hipworth	Country	Swan Hill	1945–1952
Frederick Holden	Country	Grant	1932–1950
Jack Holland	Labor	Footscray	1925–1955
Hon Thomas Hollway	Liberal	Ballarat	1932–1955
Robert Holt	Labor	Portland	1945–1947, 1950–1955
Col. Wilfrid Kent Hughes	Liberal	Kew	1927–1949
Raymond Hyatt	Labor	Hampden	1943–1947
Herbert Hyland	Country	Gippsland South	1929–1970
James Jewell^{[4]}	Labor	Brunswick	1910–1949
James Johns	Labor	Gippsland North	1945–1947
Stan Keon	Labor	Richmond	1945–1949
Alfred Kirton	Country	Mornington	1932–1947
Brig. Sir George Knox	Liberal	Scoresby	1927–1960
John Lemmon	Labor	Williamstown	1904–1955
Albert Lind	Country	Gippsland East	1920–1961
John McDonald	Country	Shepparton	1936–1955
Hon William McKenzie	Labor	Wonthaggi	1927–1947
Ian McLaren	Independent	Glen Iris	1945–1947, 1965–1979
Thomas Maltby	Min./Liberal	Barwon	1929–1961
Samuel Merrifield	Labor	Moonee Ponds	1943–1955
Wilfred Mibus	Country	Borung	1944–1964
Archie Michaelis	Min./Liberal	St Kilda	1932–1952
Tom Mitchell^{[1]}	Country	Benambra	1947–1976
Ernie Morton	Labor	Ripon	1945–1947, 1950–1955
George Moss	Country	Murray Valley	1945–1973
Charlie Mutton	Ind. Labor	Coburg	1940–1967
Trevor Oldham	Liberal	Malvern	1933–1953
Roy Paton^{[1]}	Country	Benambra	1932–1947
Bill Quirk	Labor	Prahran	1945–1948
Squire Reid	Labor	Oakleigh	1927–1932; 1937–1947
William Ruthven	Labor	Preston	1945–1961
Ernie Shepherd	Labor	Sunshine	1945–1958
Hon Bill Slater	Labor	Dundas	1917–1947
Joseph Smith	Labor	Goulburn	1945–1947, 1950–1955
Hon Clive Stoneham	Labor	Midlands	1942–1970
Brig. Ray Tovell	Liberal	Brighton	1945–1955
Bill Towers^{[2]}	Labor	Collingwood	1947–1962
Hon Tom Tunnecliffe^{[2]}	Labor	Collingwood	1903–1904; 1907–1920; 1921–1947
Leslie Webster	Country	Mernda	1944–1947
Robert Whately	Liberal	Camberwell	1945–1956
George White	Labor	Mentone	1945–1947, 1950–1955
Russell White	Country	Allandale	1945–1960

^{1} On 25 April 1947, the Country member for Benambra, Roy Paton, died. Country candidate Tom Mitchell won the resulting by-election on 7 June 1947.
^{2} In August 1947, the Labor member for Collingwood, Tom Tunnecliffe, resigned. Labor candidate Bill Towers won the resulting by-election on 20 September 1947.

== Sources ==
- "Find a Member". State Government of Victoria.
