= Members of the Victorian Legislative Assembly, 1864–1865 =

- ←1861–1864 1866–1867→

This is a list of members of the Victorian Legislative Assembly, from the elections of 5 and 21 October, and 3 November 1864, to the elections of 30 December 1865, 15 and 29 January 1866. Victoria was a British self-governing colony in Australia at the time.

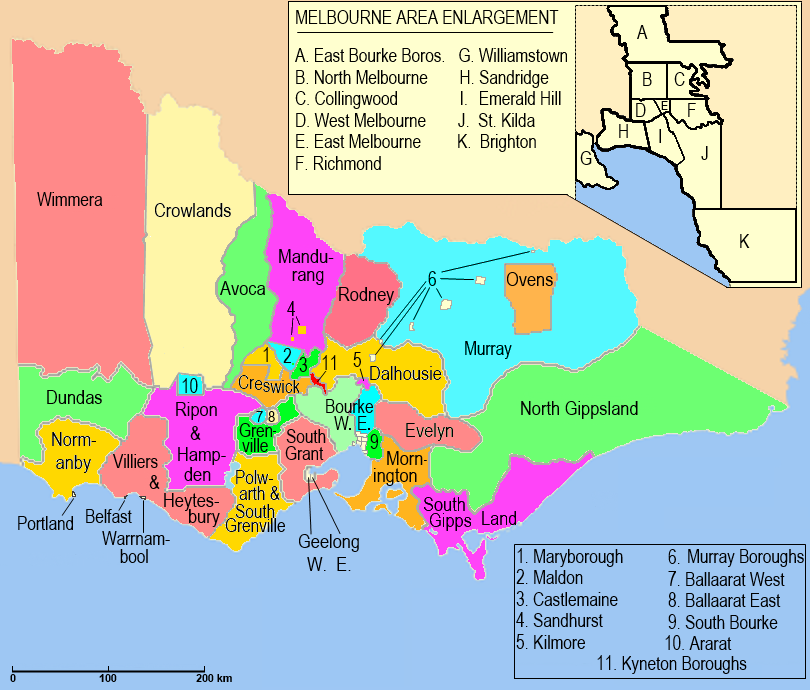
Victorian Legislative Assembly districts, 1859–1877

Note the "Term in Office" refers to that members term(s) in the Assembly, not necessarily for that electorate.

Name	Electorate	Term in Office
William Bayles	Villiers & Heytesbury	1864–1880
Graham Berry	Collingwood	1861–1865; 1869–1886; 1892–1897
Samuel Bindon	Castlemaine	1864–1868
John Hutchison Blackwood	West Melbourne	1864–1867
George Brown	Geelong West	1864–1865
John Burtt	North Melbourne	1864–1874
Ronald Campbell	Crowlands	1864–1865
Thomas Carpenter	Castlemaine	1859–1861; 1864–1865
James Casey	Mandurang	1861–1862; 1863–1880
Edward Cohen	East Melbourne	1861–1865; 1868–1877
Joseph Henry Connor	Polwarth & South Grenville	1864–1871; 1874–1877; 1882–1886
Edward Cope	East Bourke Boroughs	1864–1871
Joshua Cowell	East Bourke	1864–1865
Henry Creswick	Emerald Hill	1864–1865
John Crews	St Kilda	1858–1859; 1864–1865; 1868–1877
George Cunningham	Geelong East	1864–1874; 1881–1886
John Dane	Warrnambool	1864–1865
Benjamin George Davies	Avoca	1861–1880
Charles Dyte	Ballaarat East	1864–1871
John Edwards	Collingwood	1861–1867
George Fairbairn	Dundas	1864–1865
Nicholas Foott	Geelong West	1860–1868
James Francis	Richmond	1859–1874; 1878–1884
William Frazer	Creswick	1859–1870
Duncan Gillies	Ballaarat West	1861–1868; 1870–1877; 1877–1894; 1897–1903
Tharp Girdlestone	Ararat	1862–1865
James Macpherson Grant	Avoca	1856–1870; 1871–1885
Augustus Greeves	Belfast	1856–1857; 1857–1859; 1860–1861; 1864–1865
John Halfey	Sandhurst	1864–1867
John Harbison	West Melbourne	1864–1865; 1866–1871
George Harker	Collingwood	1856–1860; 1864–1865; 1871–1874
George Higinbotham	Brighton	1861–1861; 1862–1871; 1873–1876
John Rout Hopkins	South Grant	1864–1867; 1871–1877; 1892–1894
John Houston	Crowlands	1859–1865
Robert Frederick Howard	Sandhurst	1859–1861; 1862–1865
Charles Jones	Ballaarat East	1864–1867; 1868–1869; 1869–1871; 1886–1889
George Kerferd	Ovens	1864–1886
Mark Last King	West Bourke	1859–1861; 1864–1874; 1875–1879
Ambrose Kyte	East Melbourne	1861–1865; 1867–1867
Peter Lalor	South Grant	1856–1871; 1874–1889
George Levey	Normanby	1861–1867
Nathaniel Levi	Maryborough	1861–1865; 1866–1867
Francis Longmore	Ripon & Hampden	1864–1883; 1894–1897
James MacBain	Wimmera	1864–1880
William Nelson McCann	South Grant	1861–1867
James McCulloch	Mornington	1856–1861; 1862–1872; 1874–1878
John MacGregor	Rodney	1862–1874
William McLellan	Ararat	1859–1877; 1883–1897
John MacPherson	Portland	1864–1865; 1866–1878
James Mason	Maryborough	1864–1865
Archibald Michie	St Kilda	1856–1861; 1863–1864; 1864–1865
John Moffatt	Villiers & Heytesbury	1864–1865
David Moore	Sandridge	1856–1859; 1864–1867
Francis Murphy	Murray Boroughs	1856–1865; 1866–1871
Michael O'Grady	South Bourke	1861–1868; 1870–1876
John Orr	The Murray	1862–1867; 1872–1874; 1877–1880
John O'Shanassy	Kilmore	1856–1865; 1877–1883
William Pearson, Sr.	North Gippsland	1864–1867
Mark Morrell Pope	Grenville	1862–1865
John Ramsay	Maldon	1861–1867
Thomas Randall	Grenville	1864–1865
John Richardson	Geelong East	1861–1876
John Carre Riddell	West Bourke	1860–1877
William Robinson	North Melbourne	1864–1865
George John Sands	Dalhousie	1864–1867; 1886–1887
John Sherwin	East Bourke	1864–1865
George Verney Smith	Ovens	1864–1877
John Smith	West Bourke	1856–1879
Louis Smith	South Bourke	1859–1865; 1871–1874; 1877–1880; 1880–1883; 1886–1894
Peter Snodgrass	South Gippsland	1856–1867
James Forester Sullivan	Mandurang	1861–1871; 1874–1876
John Thomson	Evelyn	1863–1865
Robert Braithwaite Tucker	Kyneton Boroughs	1861–1867
William Vale ^{[a]}	Ballaarat West	1864–1869; 1869–1874; 1880–1881
George Frederic Verdon	Williamstown	1859–1868
Archibald Wardrop	Richmond	1864–1866
James Wheeler	Creswick	1864–1867; 1880–1900
William Zeal	Castlemaine	1864–1865; 1871–1874

^{[a]} Vale resigned in August 1865, re-elected in September 1865.

Francis Murphy was Speaker.
