= Members of the Victorian Legislative Assembly, 1924–1927 =

- ←1921–1924 1927–1929→

This is a list of members of the Victorian Legislative Assembly as elected at the 26 June 1924 state election and subsequent by-elections up to the general elections of 9 April 1927:

Name	Party	Electorate	Term in office
John Allan	Country	Rodney	1917–1936
David Allison	Country	Borung ^{[x]}	1920–1927
Hon Henry Angus	Liberal	Gunbower	1911–1934
Hon Stanley Argyle	Nationalist	Toorak	1920–1940
Hon Henry Bailey	Labor	Port Fairy ^{[x]}	1914–1932; 1935–1950
Matthew Baird	Nationalist	Ballarat West ^{[x]}	1911–1927
Samuel Barnes	Nationalist	Walhalla	1910–1927
Henry Beardmore	Nationalist	Benambra	1917–1932
Alfred Billson	Liberal	Ovens	1901–1902; 1904–1927
John Billson ^{[2]}	Labor	Fitzroy ^{[x]}	1900–1924
Maurice Blackburn ^{[2]}	Labor	Fitzroy ^{[x]}	1914–1917; 1925–1934
Ernie Bond ^{[1]}	Labor	Glenelg ^{[x]}	1924–1943
Hon Murray Bourchier	Country	Goulburn Valley	1920–1936
Hon Sir John Bowser	Country	Wangaratta ^{[x]}	1894–1929
William Brownbill	Labor	Geelong	1920–1932; 1935–1938
John Cain	Labor	Jika Jika ^{[x]}	1917–1957
John Carlisle	Country	Benalla	1903–1927
Luke Clough	Labor	Bendigo East ^{[x]}	1915–1927
Arthur Cook	Labor	Bendigo West ^{[x]}	1924–1945
Ted Cotter	Labor	Richmond	1908–1945
James Deany	Nationalist	Warrnambool	1916–1927
Alfred Downward	Country	Mornington	1894–1929
Albert Dunstan	Country	Eaglehawk ^{[x]}	1920–1950
Frederic Eggleston	Nationalist	St Kilda	1920–1927
William Everard	Liberal	Evelyn	1917–1950
Alfred Farthing	Liberal	East Melbourne ^{[x]}	1911–1927
George Frost	Labor	Maryborough ^{[x]}	1920–1942
John Gordon	Nationalist	Waranga	1911–1927
Edmund Greenwood	Nationalist	Boroondara	1917–1929
Frank Groves	Nationalist	Dandenong	1917–1929; 1932–1937
Tom Hayes	Labor	Melbourne	1924–1955
Ralph Hjorth	Labor	Bulla ^{[x]}	1924–1932
Hon Edmond Hogan	Labor	Warrenheip ^{[x]}	1913–1943
Jack Holland ^{[3]}	Labor	Flemington	1925–1955
Arthur Hughes	Labor	Grenville ^{[x]}	1921–1929
Arthur Jackson	Labor	Prahran	1924–1932
James Jewell	Labor	Brunswick	1910–1949
Frank Keane	Labor	Essendon	1924–1940
Hon Harry Lawson	Nationalist	Castlemaine and Maldon ^{[x]}	1900–1928
Hon John Lemmon	Labor	Williamstown	1904–1955
Albert Lind	Country	Gippsland East	1920–1961
William McAdam	Labor	Ballarat East ^{[x]}	1924–1932
James McDonald	Labor	Daylesford ^{[x]}	1923; 1924–1927
James McDonald	Nationalist	Polwarth	1917–1933
Hon Edwin Mackrell	Country	Upper Goulburn	1920–1945
James McLachlan	Independent	Gippsland North	1908–1938
Hon William McPherson	Nationalist	Hawthorn	1913–1930
Edward Morley	Nationalist	Barwon	1920–1929
James Murphy	Labor	Port Melbourne	1917–1942
Francis Old	Country	Swan Hill	1919–1945
Hon David Oman	Nationalist	Hampden	1900–1927
Hon Sir Alexander Peacock	Nationalist	Allandale	1889–1933
Hon John Pennington	Nationalist	Kara Kara	1913–1917; 1918–1935
Reg Pollard	Labor	Dalhousie ^{[x]}	1924–1932
Hon George Prendergast	Labor	North Melbourne ^{[x]}	1894–1897; 1900–1926; 1927–1937
Hon Bill Slater	Labor	Dundas	1917–1947
Oswald Snowball	Liberal	Brighton	1909–1928
Robert Solly	Labor	Carlton	1904–1906; 1908–1932
William Thomas ^{[1]}	Labor	Glenelg	1920–1924
Richard Toutcher	Nationalist	Stawell and Ararat	1897–1935
Hon Tom Tunnecliffe	Labor	Collingwood	1903–1904; 1907–1920; 1921–1947
Arthur Wallace	Labor	Albert Park	1919–1927; 1929–1932
Arthur Walter	Country	Gippsland West	1924–1929
Edward Warde ^{[3]}	Labor	Flemington	1900–1925
Isaac Weaver	Country	Korong ^{[x]}	1917–1927
Gordon Webber	Labor	Abbotsford ^{[x]}	1912–1932
Walter West	Nationalist	Gippsland South	1922–1927; 1927–1929
Marcus Wettenhall	Country	Lowan	1920–1935

^{1} On 11 July 1924, the Labor member for Glenelg, William Thomas, died. Labor candidate Ernie Bond won the resulting by-election on 14 August 1924.
^{2} On 23 December 1924, the Labor member for Fitzroy, John Billson, died. Labor candidate Maurice Blackburn won the resulting by-election on 4 February 1925.
^{3} On 10 November 1925, the Labor member for Flemington, Edward Warde, died. Labor candidate Jack Holland won the resulting by-election on 9 December 1925.

^{x} = district abolished in 1927
