= Members of the Victorian Legislative Assembly, 1952–1955 =

- ←1950–1952 1955–1958→

This is a list of members of the Victorian Legislative Assembly from 1952 to 1955, as elected at the 1952 state election.

Two party splits took place during the period:

- In August 1953, several Liberal members were expelled for supporting former Liberal Premier Thomas Hollway, who had formed an "Electoral Reform League" grouping in the Parliament advocating two Assembly seats for every Federal seat in Victoria and had, at the 1952 election, defeated the Liberal leader Les Norman in his own seat. With his electoral reform plans implemented by the Cain government, Hollway changed the name of the party to the Victorian Liberal Party in October 1954 (not to be confused with the extant Liberal and Country Party, the Victorian division of the federal Liberal Party).
- In 1955 during the Hobart conference of the governing Labor Party, the mostly Catholic supporters of the Industrial Groups and B. A. Santamaria either resigned from the party or were expelled and formed the Australian Labor Party (Anti-Communist), which ultimately became the Democratic Labor Party (DLP).

Both groups lost almost their entire parliamentary representation at the 1955 state election which followed, although the DLP continued to be a significant source of Liberal preferences until the early 1970s.

Name	Party	Electorate	Term in office
Hon Bill Barry	Labor/DLP	Carlton	1932–1955
John Bloomfield^{[1]}	Liberal	Malvern	1953–1970
Henry Bolte	Liberal	Hampden	1947–1972
John Bourke	Labor	St Kilda	1952–1955
Hon Richard Brose	Country	Rodney	1944–1964
William Buckingham	Country	Wonthaggi	1947–1955
Hon John Cain	Labor	Northcote	1917–1957
Les Coates	Labor	Dandenong	1952–1955
Leslie Cochrane	Country	Gippsland West	1950–1970
Phillip Connell	Labor	Evelyn	1952–1958
Frederick Cook	Country	Benalla	1936–1961
Stan Corrigan	Labor/DLP	Port Melbourne	1952–1955
Les D'Arcy	Labor/DLP	Grant	1952–1955
Alexander Dennett	Ind./Electoral Reform/VLP	Caulfield	1945–1955
Keith Dodgshun	Country	Rainbow	1938–1955
John Don	Ind./Electoral Reform/VLP	Elsternwick	1945–1955
Hon Val Doube	Labor	Oakleigh	1950–1961; 1970–1979
James Dunn	Labor/Independent	Geelong	1950–1955
George Fewster	Labor/DLP	Essendon	1950–1955
Hon Bill Galvin	Labor	Bendigo	1945–1955, 1958–1964
Hon Malcolm Gladman	Labor	Warrnambool	1952–1955
Hon Bob Gray	Labor	Box Hill	1943–1947; 1952–1955
Edward Guye	Liberal	Polwarth	1940–1958
Tom Hayes	Labor/DLP	Melbourne	1924–1955
Jack Holland	Labor	Footscray	1925–1955
Hon Thomas Hollway	Ind./Electoral Reform/VLP	Glen Iris	1932–1955
Robert Holt	Labor	Portland	1945–1947, 1950–1955
Hon Herbert Hyland	Country	Gippsland South	1929–1970
Brig. Sir George Knox	Liberal	Scoresby	1927–1960
William Leggatt	Liberal	Mornington	1947–1956
John Lemmon	Labor	Williamstown	1904–1955
Alan Lind	Labor	Mildura	1952–1955, 1969–1979
Hon Sir Albert Lind	Country	Gippsland East	1920–1961
Michael Lucy	Labor/DLP	Ivanhoe	1952–1955
Bob McClure	Labor	Dundas	1952–1955
John McDonald	Country	Shepparton	1936–1955
Sir Thomas Maltby	Liberal	Barwon	1929–1961
Hon Samuel Merrifield	Labor	Moonee Ponds	1943–1955
Wilfred Mibus	Liberal	Borung	1944–1964
Hon Tom Mitchell	Country	Benambra	1947–1976
Edmund Morrissey	Labor/DLP	Mernda	1952–1955
Ernie Morton	Labor	Ripon	1945–1947, 1950–1955
Hon George Moss	Country	Murray Valley	1945–1973
Charles Murphy	Labor/DLP	Hawthorn	1952–1955
Charlie Mutton	Ind. Labor	Coburg	1940–1967
Joseph O'Carroll	Labor/DLP	Clifton Hill	1949–1955
Trevor Oldham^{[1]}	Liberal	Malvern	1933–1953
Robert Pettiona	Labor	Prahran	1951–1955
Horace Petty	Liberal	Toorak	1952–1964
Peter Randles	Labor/DLP	Brunswick	1949–1955
William Ruthven	Labor	Preston	1945–1961
Arthur Rylah	Liberal	Kew	1949–1971
Frank Scully	Labor/DLP	Richmond	1949–1958
Hon John Sheehan	Labor	Ballarat	1952–1955
Hon Ernie Shepherd	Labor	Sunshine	1945–1958
Hon Joseph Smith	Labor	Goulburn	1945–1947, 1950–1955
Harold Stirling	Country	Swan Hill	1952–1968
Hector Stoddart	Labor	Gippsland North	1952–1955
Hon Clive Stoneham	Labor	Midlands	1942–1970
Hon Keith Sutton	Labor	Albert Park	1950–1970
Ray Tovell	Ind./Electoral Reform/VLP	Brighton	1945–1955
Bill Towers	Labor	Collingwood	1947–1962
Keith Turnbull	Liberal	Korong	1950–1964
Robert Whately	Liberal	Camberwell	1945–1956
George White	Labor/DLP	Mentone	1945–1947, 1950–1955
Hon Russell White	Country	Allandale	1945–1960

^{1} On 2 May 1953, the Opposition Leader and Liberal member for Malvern, Trevor Oldham, died. Liberal candidate John Bloomfield won the resulting by-election on 11 July 1953.

== Sources ==
- "Find a Member". State Government of Victoria.
