= Members of the Victorian Legislative Assembly, 1955–1958 =

- ←1952–1955 1958–1961→

This is a list of members of the Victorian Legislative Assembly from 1955 to 1958, as elected at the 1955 state election:

Name	Party	Electorate	Term in office
Jim Balfour	Liberal	Morwell	1955–1982
Nathaniel Barclay	Country	Mildura	1947–1952; 1955–1962
Hon John Bloomfield	Liberal	Malvern	1953–1970
Hon Henry Bolte	Liberal	Hampden	1947–1972
Hon Richard Brose	Country	Rodney	1944–1964
Hon John Cain^{[4]}	Labor	Northcote	1917–1957
Vernon Christie	Liberal	Ivanhoe	1955–1973
Arthur Clarey	Labor	Melbourne	1955–1972
Leslie Cochrane	Country	Gippsland West	1950–1970
Phillip Connell	Labor	Evelyn	1952–1958
Frederick Cook	Country	Benalla	1936–1961
Roy Crick	Labor	Grant	1955–1966
Hon Val Doube	Labor	Oakleigh	1950–1961; 1970–1979
Arthur Drakeford, Jr.	Labor	Pascoe Vale	1945–1947; 1955–1958
Roberts Dunstan^{[2]}	Liberal	Mornington	1956–1982
Leo Fennessy	Labor	Brunswick East	1955–1970
Larry Floyd	Labor	Williamstown	1955–1973
Alexander Fraser	Liberal	Caulfield East	1950–1952; 1955–1965
Richard Gainey	Liberal	Elsternwick	1955–1967
George Gibbs	Liberal	Portland	1955–1967
Edward Guye	Liberal	Polwarth	1940–1958
Jack Holden	Liberal	Moonee Ponds	1955–1967
Jack Holland^{[1]}	Labor	Flemington	1925–1955
Kevin Holland^{[1]}	Labor	Flemington	1956–1967
Hon Sir Herbert Hyland	Country	Gippsland South	1929–1970
Harry Kane	Liberal	Broadmeadows	1955–1962
Brig. Sir George Knox	Liberal	Scoresby	1927–1960
Hon William Leggatt^{[2]}	Liberal	Mornington	1947–1956
Hon Sir Albert Lind	Country	Gippsland East	1920–1961
Denis Lovegrove	Labor	Carlton	1955–1973
Sam Loxton	Liberal	Prahran	1955–1979
Colin MacDonald	Labor	Geelong West	1955–1958
Jim MacDonald	Liberal	Burwood	1955–1976
Hon William McDonald	Liberal	Dundas	1947–1952; 1955–1970
Hon Sir Thomas Maltby	Liberal	Geelong	1929–1961
Jim Manson	Liberal	Hawthorn	1955–1973
Edward Meagher	Liberal	Mentone	1955–1976
Hon Wilfred Mibus	Liberal	Lowan	1944–1964
Hon Tom Mitchell	Country	Benambra	1947–1976
Hon George Moss	Country	Murray Valley	1945–1973
Charlie Mutton	Independent/Labor	Coburg	1940–1967
Hon Horace Petty	Liberal	Toorak	1952–1964
Murray Porter	Liberal	Sandringham	1955–1970
Joe Rafferty	Liberal	Caulfield	1955–1979
Hon George Reid	Liberal	Box Hill	1947–1952; 1955–1973
Charlie Ring	Labor	Preston	1955–1970
John Rossiter	Liberal	Brighton	1955–1976
William Ruthven	Labor	Reservoir	1945–1961
Hon Arthur Rylah	Liberal	Kew	1949–1971
Roy Schintler	Labor	Footscray	1955–1967
Gordon Scott	Liberal	Ballarat South	1955–1964
Frank Scully	DLP	Richmond	1949–1958
Hon Ernie Shepherd	Labor	Ascot Vale	1945–1958
Baron Snider	Liberal	St Kilda	1955–1964
John Stanistreet	Liberal	Bendigo	1955–1958
Harold Stirling	Country	Swan Hill	1952–1968
Hon Clive Stoneham	Labor	Midlands	1942–1970
Bob Suggett	Liberal	Moorabbin	1955–1979
Keith Sutton	Labor	Albert Park	1950–1970
Edgar Tanner	Liberal	Ripponlea	1955–1976
Alex Taylor	Liberal	Balwyn	1955–1973
Archie Todd	Labor	Port Melbourne	1955–1958
Bill Towers	Labor	Collingwood	1947–1962
Campbell Turnbull	Labor	Brunswick West	1955–1973
Hon Keith Turnbull	Liberal	Kara Kara	1950–1964
Hon Robert Whately^{[3]}	Liberal	Camberwell	1945–1956
Hon Russell White	Country	Ballarat North	1945–1960
Vernon Wilcox^{[3]}	Liberal	Camberwell	1956–1976
Frank Wilkes^{[4]}	Labor	Northcote	1957–1988
Ray Wiltshire	Liberal	Dandenong	1955–1976

^{1} On 25 December 1955, the Labor member for Flemington, Jack Holland, died. His son Kevin Holland won the resulting by-election on 18 February 1956.
^{2} In February 1956, the Liberal member for Mornington, William Leggatt, resigned to become Agent-General for Victoria in London. Liberal candidate Roberts Dunstan won the resulting by-election on 3 March 1956.
^{3} On 17 March 1956, the Liberal member for Camberwell, Robert Whately, died in a car accident near Yass. Liberal candidate Vernon Wilcox won the resulting by-election on 21 April 1956.
^{4} On 4 August 1957, the Labor member for Northcote and former Premier of Victoria, John Cain, died while campaigning for Labor at the Queensland election. Labor candidate Frank Wilkes won the resulting by-election on 21 September 1957.
