= Members of the Victorian Legislative Assembly, 1937–1940 =

- ←1935–1937 1940–1943→

This is a list of members of the Victorian Legislative Assembly from 1937 to 1940, as elected at the 1937 state election.

Name	Party	Electorate	Term in office
Albert Allnutt	Country	Mildura	1927–1945
Hon Sir Stanley Argyle	United Australia	Toorak	1920–1940
Hon Henry Bailey	Country	Warrnambool	1914–1932; 1935–1950
Bill Barry	Labor	Carlton	1932–1955
Matthew Bennett	Country	Gippsland West	1929–1950
Ernie Bond	Independent/Labor	Port Fairy and Glenelg	1924–1943
Alexander Borthwick^{[3]}	Country	Gippsland North	1938–1942
Fanny Brownbill^{[2]}	Labor	Geelong	1938–1948
William Brownbill^{[2]}	Labor	Geelong	1920–1932; 1935–1938
Hon Albert Bussau^{[1]}	Country	Ouyen	1932–1938
John Cain	Labor	Northcote	1917–1957
Finlay Cameron	Country	Kara Kara and Borung	1935–1945
Col. Harold Cohen	United Australia	Caulfield	1935–1943
Arthur Cook	Labor	Bendigo	1924–1945
Frederick Cook	Ind./McEwen Country	Benalla	1936–1961
Ted Cotter	Labor	Richmond	1908–1945
Ernest Coyle	Country	Waranga	1927–1943
Bert Cremean	Labor	Clifton Hill	1929–1932; 1934–1945
William Cumming	United Australia	Hampden	1935–1945
Patrick Denigan	Labor	Allandale	1936–1945
Lot Diffey	Country	Wangaratta and Ovens	1929–1945
James Dillon	United Australia	Essendon	1932–1943
Keith Dodgshun^{[1]}	Country	Ouyen	1938–1955
Hon Albert Dunstan	Country	Korong and Eaglehawk	1920–1950
William Dunstone	Country	Rodney	1936–1944
John Ellis	United Australia	Prahran	1932–1945
William Everard	United Australia	Evelyn	1917–1950
Frank Field	Labor	Dandenong	1937–1947
George Frost	Labor	Maryborough and Daylesford	1920–1942
John Austin Gray^{[4]}	United Australia	Hawthorn	1930–1939
William Haworth	United Australia	Albert Park	1937–1945
Tom Hayes	Labor	Melbourne	1924–1955
Hon Edmond Hogan	Country	Warrenheip and Grenville	1913–1943
Frederick Holden	Independent	Grant	1932–1950
Jack Holland	Labor	Flemington	1925–1955
Thomas Hollway	United Australia	Ballarat	1932–1955
Col. Wilfrid Kent Hughes	United Australia	Kew	1927–1949
Hon Herbert Hyland	Country	Gippsland South	1929–1970
James Jewell	Labor	Brunswick	1910–1949
Frank Keane	Labor	Coburg	1924–1940
Alfred Kirton	United Australia/Country	Mornington	1932–1947
Brig. George Knox	United Australia	Upper Yarra	1927–1960
Hamilton Lamb	Country	Lowan	1935–1943
Hon John Lemmon	Labor	Williamstown	1904–1955
Hon Albert Lind	Country	Gippsland East	1920–1961
Alec McDonald	Country	Stawell and Ararat	1935–1945
Allan McDonald	United Australia	Polwarth	1933–1940
John McDonald	Country	Goulburn Valley	1936–1955
Hon Ian Macfarlan	Independent	Brighton	1928–1945
William McKenzie	Labor	Wonthaggi	1927–1947
Hon Edwin Mackrell	Country	Upper Goulburn	1920–1945
James McLachlan^{[3]}	Independent	Gippsland North	1908–1938
Thomas Maltby	United Australia	Barwon	1929–1961
Hon Norman Martin	Country	Gunbower	1934–1945
Archie Michaelis	United Australia	St Kilda	1932–1952
William Moncur	Country	Walhalla	1927–1945
Jack Mullens	Labor	Footscray	1937–1945
James Murphy	Labor	Port Melbourne	1917–1942
Hon Francis Old	Country	Swan Hill	1919–1945
Trevor Oldham	United Australia	Boroondara	1933–1953
Roy Paton	Country	Benambra	1932–1947
Squire Reid	Labor	Oakleigh	1927–1932; 1937–1947
Clive Shields	United Australia	Castlemaine and Kyneton	1932–1940
Hon Bill Slater	Labor	Dundas	1917–1947
Hon Tom Tunnecliffe	Labor	Collingwood	1903–1904; 1907–1920; 1921–1947
Les Tyack^{[4]}	United Australia	Hawthorn	1939–1940; 1950–1952
Ivy Weber	Independent	Nunawading	1937–1943
Harry White	United Australia	Bulla and Dalhousie	1932–1943
Henry Zwar	United Australia	Heidelberg	1932–1945

^{1} In April 1938, the Country member for Ouyen, Albert Bussau, resigned to take up an appointment as Agent-General for Victoria in London. Country candidate Keith Dodgshun was elected unopposed as his replacement in May 1938.
^{2} On 29 April 1938, the Labor member for Geelong, William Brownbill, died. His widow, Labor candidate Fanny Brownbill, won the resulting by-election on 4 June 1938, becoming the first woman Labor MP in Victoria.
^{3} On 18 September 1938, the Independent member for Gippsland North, James McLachlan, died. Country candidate Alexander Borthwick won the resulting by-election on 5 November 1938.
^{4} On 6 May 1939, the UAP member for Hawthorn, John Austin Gray, died. UAP candidate Les Tyack won the resulting by-election on 10 June 1939.

== Sources ==
- "Find a Member". State Government of Victoria.
