= Post-election pendulum for the 2002 Victorian state election =

The following is a Mackerras pendulum for the 2002 Victorian state election.

"Safe" seats require a swing of over 10 per cent to change, "fairly safe" seats require a swing of between 6 and 10 per cent, while "marginal" seats require a swing of less than 6 per cent.

Seats which changed hands are shown in bold.

**Labor seats**
**Seat**	**Party**	**Margin**	**Swing to ALP**
**Marginal**
**Evelyn**	ALP	0.3%	+12.7%
**Hastings**	ALP	0.8%	+8.1%
**Gembrook**	ALP	1.6%	+8.6%
Melbourne	ALP	1.9% v GRN	*
**Kilsyth**	ALP	2.1%	+10.1%
**Ferntree Gully**	ALP	2.3%	+9.9%
**Mount Waverley**	ALP	2.3%	+11.4%
**Bayswater**	ALP	2.8%	+9.2%
Richmond	ALP	3.1% v GRN	*
**Prahran**	ALP	4.4%	+9.2%
**Mordialloc**	ALP	4.5%	+7.1%
**Bentleigh**	ALP	4.8%	+6.8%
**Eltham**	ALP	4.8%	+8.6%
Morwell	ALP	4.9%	-4.2%
**South Barwon**	ALP	5.0%	+9.8%
**Burwood**	ALP	5.1%	+11.9%
**Frankston**	ALP	5.8%	+9.1%
**Forest Hill**	ALP	5.8%	+12.2%
**Fairly safe**
**Narracan**	ALP	6.8%	+7.3%
Ripon	ALP	7.4%	+5.5%
Ballarat East	ALP	7.6%	+4.2%
Mitcham	ALP	7.7%	+7.7%
Northcote	ALP	7.9% v GRN	*
**Geelong**	ALP	8.1%	+8.6%
**Bellarine**	ALP	8.3%	+9.8%
**Monbulk**	ALP	8.3%	+10.8%
Ballarat West	ALP	9.0%	+7.4%
**Macedon**	ALP	9.3%	+9.7%
Brunswick	ALP	9.3%	*
Seymour	ALP	9.5%	+9.5%
**Yan Yean**	ALP	9.5%	+10.2%
**Narre Warren North**	ALP	9.7%	+14.9%
**Safe**
Cranbourne	ALP	10.8%	+9.2%
Carrum	ALP	12.2%	+10.8%
Ivanhoe	ALP	12.5%	+7.6%
Albert Park	ALP	12.5%	+5.8%
**Narre Warren South**	ALP	12.6%	+14.1%
Bendigo East	ALP	13.0%	+10.0%
Oakleigh	ALP	15.2%	+12.2%
Melton	ALP	15.3%	+8.6%
Yuroke	ALP	15.9%	+7.6%
Bendigo West	ALP	16.0%	+4.9%
Mulgrave	ALP	16.2%	+11.8%
Niddrie	ALP	16.6%	+10.1%
Tarneit	ALP	17.4%	+6.6%
Bundoora	ALP	17.6%	+10.3%
Keilor	ALP	18.1%	+11.4%
**Very safe**
Dandenong	ALP	20.3%	+8.7%
Lara	ALP	22.4%	+9.7%
Yuroke	ALP	22.9%	+13.8%
Clayton	ALP	23.9%	+11.8%
Pascoe Vale	ALP	24.2%	+7.3%
Altona	ALP	24.7%	+9.1%
Footscray	ALP	24.9%	+7.0%
Lyndhurst	ALP	25.1%	+14.2%
Williamstown	ALP	25.7%	+7.5%
Preston	ALP	25.8%	+6.9%
Mill Park	ALP	26.8%	+12.9%
Kororoit	ALP	27.1%	+6.2%
Derrimut	ALP	27.3%	+7.0%
Broadmeadows	ALP	30.8%	+5.8%
Thomastown	ALP	31.8%	+7.6%

**Liberal/National seats**
**Seat**	**Party**	**Margin**	**Swing to ALP**
**Marginal**
Nepean	LIB	0.2%	+6.1%
Bass	LIB	0.6%	*
South-West Coast	LIB	0.7%	+3.9%
Doncaster	LIB	0.8%	+11.7%
Box Hill	LIB	1.1%	+6.9%
Mornington	LIB	1.8%	+10.1%
Benalla	NAT	2.0%	+5.4%
Caulfield	LIB	2.3%	+6.0%
Bulleen	LIB	2.6%	+10.1%
Sandringham	LIB	3.0%	+9.2%
Scoresby	LIB	3.3%	+11.5%
Benambra	LIB	4.0%	+3.6%
Shepparton	NAT	4.3%	*
Hawthorn	LIB	5.9%	+8.3%
**Fairly safe**
Kew	LIB	6.0%	+7.9%
Warrandyte	LIB	6.4%	+7.5%
Brighton	LIB	7.4%	+7.4%
Polwarth	LIB	9.5%	+3.7%
**Safe**
Rodney	NAT	10.0% v LIB	*
Malvern	LIB	10.2%	+6.0%
Gippsland South	NAT	10.9%	-2.8%
Gippsland East	IND	11.8% v NAT	*
Murray Valley	NAT	13.9%	+1.9%
Swan Hill	NAT	14.2%	*
Lowan	NAT	17.1%	*
Mildura	IND	18.5% v NAT	*
