= Members of the Victorian Legislative Assembly, 1866–1867 =

- ←1864–1865 1868–1871→

This is a list of members of the Victorian Legislative Assembly, from the elections of 30 December 1865, 15 and 29 January 1866 to the elections of 21 January; 7, 20 February 1868. Victoria was a British self-governing colony in Australia at the time.

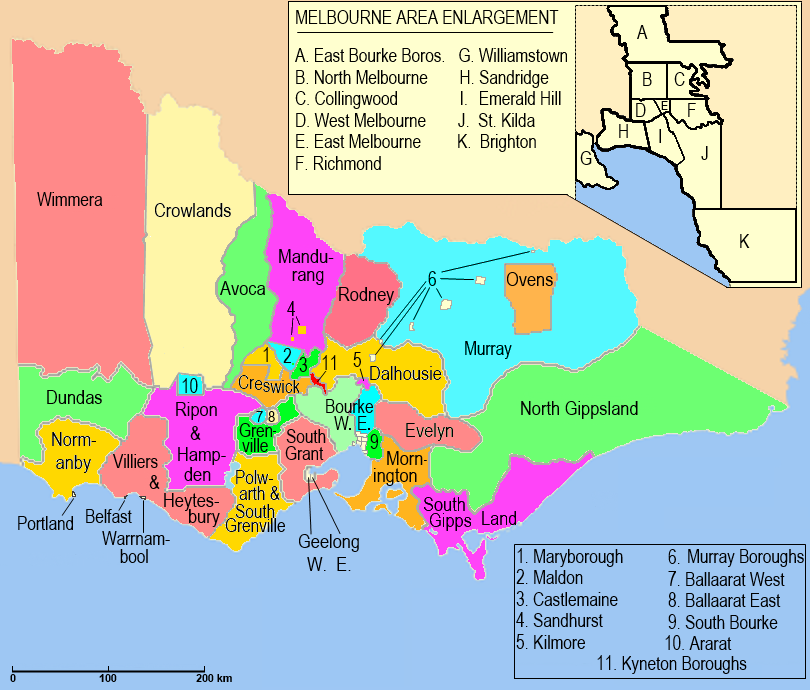
Victorian Legislative Assembly districts, 1859–1877

Note the "Term in Office" refers to that members term(s) in the Assembly, not necessarily for that electorate.

Name	Electorate	Term in Office
Butler Aspinall	Portland	1856–1864; 1866–1870
William Baillie	Castlemaine	1866–1870
James Balfour	East Bourke	1866–1868
William Bayles	Villiers & Heytesbury	1864–1880
Samuel Bindon	Castlemaine	1864–1868
John Hutchison Blackwood	West Melbourne	1864–1867
Robert Bowman	Maryborough	1866–1870; 1877–1885; 1890–1893
Brice Bunny	St Kilda	1866–1867
Robert Burrowes	Sandhurst	1866–1877; 1880–1893
John Burtt	North Melbourne	1864–1874
Robert Byrne	Crowlands	1866–1869
James Casey	Mandurang	1861–1862; 1863–1880
Joseph Henry Connor	Polwarth & South Grenville	1864–1871; 1874–1877; 1882–1886
Edward Cope	East Bourke Boroughs	1864–1871
George Cunningham	Geelong East	1864–1874; 1881–1886
Benjamin George Davies	Avoca	1861–1880
Charles Dyte	Ballaarat East	1864–1871
John Edwards	Collingwood	1861–1867
Thomas Embling	Collingwood	1856–1861; 1866–1867
Gordon Evans	Belfast	1866–1867
James Farrell	Castlemaine	1866–1878
Nicholas Foott	Geelong West	1860–1868
James Francis	Richmond	1859–1874; 1878–1884
William Frazer	Creswick	1859–1870
Duncan Gillies	Ballaarat West	1861–1868; 1870–1877; 1877–1894; 1897–1903
James Macpherson Grant	Avoca	1856–1870; 1871–1885
John Halfey	Sandhurst	1864–1867
Patrick Hanna	Murray Boroughs	1866–1877
John Harbison	North Melbourne	1864–1865; 1866–1871
Richard Heath	Geelong West	1866–1867
Henry Henty	Grenville	1866–1867
George Higinbotham	Brighton	1861–1861; 1862–1871; 1873–1876
John Rout Hopkins	South Grant	1864–1867; 1871–1877; 1892–1894
Richard Davies Ireland	Kilmore	1857–1864; 1866–1867
Charles Jones	Ballaarat East	1864–1867; 1868–1869; 1869–1871; 1886–1889
George Kerferd	Ovens	1864–1886
Mark Last King	West Bourke	1859–1861; 1864–1874; 1875–1879
Peter Lalor	South Grant	1856–1871; 1874–1889
Edward Langton	East Melbourne	1866–1877
George Levey	Normanby	1861–1867
Nathaniel Levi	East Melbourne	1861–1865; 1866–1867
Francis Longmore	Ripon & Hampden	1864–1883; 1894–1897
Andrew Love	Crowlands	1866–1867
James MacBain	Wimmera	1864–1880
William Nelson McCann ^{[a]}	South Grant	1861–1867
Matthew McCaw	East Bourke	1866–1870
James McCulloch	Mornington	1856–1861; 1862–1872; 1874–1878
John MacGregor	Rodney	1862–1874
James McKean	Maryborough	1866–1871; 1875–1876; 1880–1883
William McLellan	Ararat	1859–1877; 1883–1897
Charles MacMahon	West Melbourne	1861–1864; 1866–1878; 1880–1886
John MacPherson	Dundas	1864–1865; 1866–1878
David Moore	Sandridge	1856–1859; 1864–1867
Francis Murphy	Grenville	1856–1865; 1866–1871
Michael O'Grady	South Bourke	1861–1868; 1870–1876
John Orr	The Murray	1862–1867; 1872–1874; 1877–1880
William Pearson, Sr.	North Gippsland	1864–1867
William Plummer	Warrnambool	1866–1874
John Ramsay	Maldon	1861–1867
Isaac Reeves	Collingwood	1866–1869
John Richardson	Geelong East	1861–1876
John Carre Riddell	West Bourke	1860–1877
George John Sands	Dalhousie	1864–1867; 1886–1887
George Paton Smith	South Bourke	1866–1871; 1874–1877
George Verney Smith	Ovens	1864–1877
John Smith	West Bourke	1856–1879
Frederick Smyth	Villiers & Heytesbury	1866–1867; 1868–1875; 1877–1880
Peter Snodgrass	South Gippsland	1856–1867
Joshua Snowball	St Kilda	1866–1867
James Forester Sullivan	Mandurang	1861–1871; 1874–1876
Robert Braithwaite Tucker	Kyneton Boroughs	1861–1867
William Vale	Ballaarat West	1864–1869; 1869–1874; 1880–1881
George Frederic Verdon	Williamstown	1859–1868
Archibald Wardrop ^{[b]}	Richmond	1864–1866
William Watkins	Evelyn	1866–1874
James Wheeler	Creswick	1864–1867; 1880–1900
John Whiteman	Emerald Hill	1866–1867; 1868–1877
William Wilson	Ararat	1866–1874; 1881–1883

^{[a]} McCann forfeited his seat in August 1867 after being imprisoned for forgery, replaced by William Stutt in September 1867.
^{[b]} Wardrop resigned c. September 1866, replaced by Ambrose Kyte in a September by-election.
Francis Murphy was Speaker.
