= Members of the Victorian Legislative Assembly, 1935–1937 =

- ←1932–1935 1937–1940→

This is a list of members of the Victorian Legislative Assembly from 1935 to 1937, as elected at the 1935 state election.

| Name | Party | Electorate | Term in office |
|---|---|---|---|
| John Allan ^{[2]} | Country | Rodney | 1917–1936 |
| Albert Allnutt | Country | Mildura | 1927–1945 |
| Hon Sir Stanley Argyle | United Australia | Toorak | 1920–1940 |
| Hon Henry Bailey | Country | Warrnambool | 1914–1932; 1935–1950 |
| Bill Barry | Labor | Carlton | 1932–1955 |
| Matthew Bennett | Country | Gippsland West | 1929–1950 |
| Ernie Bond | Independent Labor | Port Fairy and Glenelg | 1924–1943 |
| Hon Murray Bourchier ^{[3]} | Country | Goulburn Valley | 1920–1936 |
| William Boyland | United Australia | Nunawading | 1934–1937 |
| William Brownbill | Labor | Geelong | 1920–1932; 1935–1938 |
| Albert Bussau | Country | Ouyen | 1932–1938 |
| John Cain | Labor | Northcote | 1917–1957 |
| Finlay Cameron | Country | Kara Kara and Borung | 1935–1945 |
| Edward Cleary ^{[4]} | Country | Benalla | 1927–1936 |
| Col. Harold Cohen | United Australia | Caulfield | 1935–1943 |
| Arthur Cook | Labor | Bendigo | 1924–1945 |
| Frederick Cook ^{[4]} | Independent | Benalla | 1936–1961 |
| Ted Cotter | Labor | Richmond | 1908–1945 |
| Ernest Coyle | Country | Waranga | 1927–1943 |
| Bert Cremean | Labor | Clifton Hill | 1929–1932; 1934–1945 |
| William Cumming | United Australia | Hampden | 1935–1945 |
| Patrick Denigan ^{[1]} | Labor | Allandale | 1936–1945 |
| Lot Diffey | Country | Wangaratta and Ovens | 1929–1945 |
| James Dillon | United Australia | Essendon | 1932–1943 |
| Harry Drew | Nationalist | Albert Park | 1932–1937; 1947–1950 |
| Hon Albert Dunstan | Country | Korong and Eaglehawk | 1920–1950 |
| William Dunstone ^{[2]} | Country | Rodney | 1936–1944 |
| John Ellis | United Australia | Prahran | 1932–1945 |
| William Everard | United Australia | Evelyn | 1917–1950 |
| George Frost | Labor | Maryborough and Daylesford | 1920–1942 |
| John Austin Gray | United Australia | Hawthorn | 1930–1939 |
| Frank Groves | United Australia | Dandenong | 1917–1929; 1932–1937 |
| Tom Hayes | Labor | Melbourne | 1924–1955 |
| Hon Edmond Hogan | Country | Warrenheip and Grenville | 1913–1943 |
| Frederick Holden | United Australia ^{[A]} | Grant | 1932–1950 |
| Jack Holland | Labor | Flemington | 1925–1955 |
| Thomas Hollway | United Australia | Ballarat | 1932–1955 |
| Col. Wilfrid Kent Hughes | United Australia | Kew | 1927–1949 |
| Hon Herbert Hyland | Country | Gippsland South | 1929–1970 |
| James Jewell | Labor | Brunswick | 1910–1949 |
| Frank Keane | Labor | Coburg | 1924–1940 |
| Alfred Kirton | United Australia ^{[A]} | Mornington | 1932–1947 |
| Brig. George Knox | United Australia ^{[A]} | Upper Yarra | 1927–1960 |
| Hamilton Lamb | Country | Lowan | 1935–1943 |
| Hon John Lemmon | Labor | Williamstown | 1904–1955 |
| Hon Albert Lind | Country | Gippsland East | 1920–1961 |
| Alec McDonald | Country | Stawell and Ararat | 1935–1945 |
| Allan McDonald | United Australia | Polwarth | 1933–1940 |
| John McDonald ^{[3]} | Country | Goulburn Valley | 1936–1955 |
| Hon Ian Macfarlan | United Australia ^{[A]} | Brighton | 1928–1945 |
| William McKenzie | Labor | Wonthaggi | 1927–1947 |
| Hon Edwin Mackrell | Country | Upper Goulburn | 1920–1945 |
| James McLachlan | Independent | Gippsland North | 1908–1938 |
| Thomas Maltby | United Australia ^{[A]} | Barwon | 1929–1961 |
| Hon Norman Martin | Country | Gunbower | 1934–1945 |
| Archie Michaelis | United Australia | St Kilda | 1932–1952 |
| William Moncur | Country | Walhalla | 1927–1945 |
| James Murphy | Labor | Port Melbourne | 1917–1942 |
| Hon Francis Old | Country | Swan Hill | 1919–1945 |
| Trevor Oldham | United Australia | Boroondara | 1933–1953 |
| Thomas Parkin ^{[1]} | United Australia | Allandale | 1935–1936 |
| Roy Paton | Country | Benambra | 1932–1947 |
| Hon George Prendergast ^{[5]} | Labor | Footscray | 1894–1897; 1900–1926; 1927–1937 |
| Clive Shields | United Australia ^{[A]} | Castlemaine and Kyneton | 1932–1940 |
| Hon Bill Slater | Labor | Dundas | 1917–1947 |
| James Vinton Smith | United Australia | Oakleigh | 1932–1937 |
| Hon Tom Tunnecliffe | Labor | Collingwood | 1903–1904; 1907–1920; 1921–1947 |
| Harry White | United Australia | Bulla and Dalhousie | 1932–1943 |
| Henry Zwar | United Australia | Heidelberg | 1932–1945 |

^{1} On 29 January 1936, the UAP member for Allandale, Thomas Parkin, died. Labor candidate Patrick Denigan won the resulting by-election on 21 March 1936.
^{2} On 22 February 1936, the Country member for Rodney, John Allan, died. Country candidate William Dunstone won the resulting by-election on 18 April 1936.
^{3} In August 1936, the Country member for Goulburn Valley, Murray Bourchier, resigned to take up an appointment as Agent-General for Victoria in London. Country candidate John McDonald won the resulting by-election on 19 September 1936.
^{4} On 24 August 1936, the Country member for Benalla, Edward Cleary, died. Independent candidate Frederick Cook won the resulting by-election on 3 October 1936.
^{1} On 28 August 1937, the Labor member for Footscray, George Prendergast, died. No by-election was held due to the proximity of the 1937 state election.
^{A} In 1936–1937, six United Australia MPs (Shields, Knox, Maltby, Kirton, Drew, and Macfarlan) formed the "Country and Liberal wing" of the party and shifted to the crossbenches, declaring their unhappiness with the direction of the UAP and asserting their right to support the Dunstan government on measures of which they approved. They remained formally in the party, neither resigning nor being expelled, until the disbandment of the section immediately following the 1937 election.
