= Post-election pendulum for the 1999 Victorian state election =

The following is a Mackerras pendulum for the 1999 Victorian state election.

"Safe" seats require a swing of over 10 per cent to change, "fairly safe" seats require a swing of between 6 and 10 per cent, while "marginal" seats require a swing of less than 6 per cent.

Labor seats			Liberal-National seats		
Seat	Margin	Swing	Seat	Margin	Swing
Broadmeadows	24.7	-0.4			
Thomastown	23.9	+1.9			
Coburg	21.8	+4.9	Malvern	16.6	+1.0
Sunshine	20.2	+1.1	Murray Valley	15.9	+6.5
Preston	18.6	+3.3	Rodney	15.7	+10.5
Williamstown	18.5	+2.9	Brighton	15.6	+2.5
Footscray	17.6	-1.8	Wimmera ^{1}	15.1	*
Richmond	16.2	-1.1	Hawthorn	14.1	-0.5
Northcote	16.1	-3.8	Kew	13.8	+1.2
Mill Park	15.8	+1.9	Warrandyte	13.5	+0.4
Pascoe Vale	14.9	+3.8	Doncaster	13.3	+1.7
Altona	14.7	+6.5	Glen Waverley	13.2	+2.5
Melbourne	13.8	-2.1	Sandringham	12.5	+1.8
Keilor	11.9	+0.3	Wantirna	11.9	+1.2
Clayton	11.7	+2.1	Bulleen	11.6	+3.0
Werribee	11.5	+0.8	Mooroolbark	10.9	+1.3
Melton	11.3	-0.9	Frankston	10.7	+4.7
Bendigo West	11.3	+9.1	Polwarth	10.7	-2.6
Geelong North	10.9	+2.8	Evelyn	9.5	+3.2
Springvale	10.8	+2.9	Warrnambool	8.8	+5.0
Morwell	8.9	+6.2	Caulfield	8.5	+0.8
Essendon	8.5	+5.1	Box Hill	7.6	+2.7
Dandenong North	8.0	+5.8	Gippsland South	7.5	+11.9
Gippsland East ^{2}	7.7	*	Benalla	7.4	+7.9
Niddrie	6.8	+2.4	Knox	7.3	+0.6
Albert Park	6.4	-2.4	Forest Hill	7.1	+3.4
Mildura ^{3}	6.1	*	Benambra	7.1	+7.9
Bundoora	6.1	+3.5	Burwood	6.8	+1.8
Dandenong	5.8	+2.4	Pakenham	6.5	+4.6
Ivanhoe	5.4	+3.9	Dromana	6.2	+1.9
Frankston East	4.6	+7.7	Bennettswood	6.1	+3.1
Yan Yean	4.2	+2.6	Mornington	5.7	+5.6
Gippsland West ^{4}	3.9	*	Cranbourne	5.7	+3.4
Tullamarine	3.8	+7.0	Berwick	5.0	+0.4
Ballarat East	3.7	+4.7	South Barwon	4.7	+5.5
Oakleigh	3.3	+3.4	Bayswater	4.7	+2.8
Bendigo East	2.9	+7.9	Portland	4.5	+5.9
Ripon	2.6	+7.2	Shepparton ^{5}	4.1	*
Narracan	2.5	+4.1	Prahran	4.0	+0.6
Gisborne	1.6	+9.4	Eltham	3.6	+3.3
Ballarat West	1.0	+5.8	Monbulk	3.2	+2.0
Seymour	0.7	+4.9	Swan Hill ^{6}	2.8	*
Mitcham	0.5	+5.8	Mordialloc	2.2	+2.5
Carrum	0.2	+1.3	Bentleigh	1.9	+2.8
Geelong	0.0	+3.5	Bellarine	1.7	+3.8

== Notes ==
Seats which changed hands are shown in bold.

A plus (+) sign in front of a swing figure indicates a swing towards Labor and a minus (-) sign indicates a swing to the Liberal-National parties.

^{1} No swing figure is available for this seat due to the lack of a Labor versus Liberal-National margin at the previous election.

^{2} The margin for this seat is Independent (Craig Ingram) over National.

^{3} The margin for this seat is Independent (Russell Savage) over Liberal.

^{4} The margin for this seat is Independent (Susan Davies) over Liberal.

^{5} The margin for this seat is National over Independent (Chris Hazelman).

^{6} The margin for this seat is National over Independent (Carl Ditterich).
