= Members of the Victorian Legislative Assembly, 1961–1964 =

- ←1958–1961 1964–1967→

This is a list of members of the Victorian Legislative Assembly from 1961 to 1964, as elected at the 1961 state election:

Name	Party	Electorate	Term in office
Hon Jim Balfour	Liberal	Morwell	1955–1982
Nathaniel Barclay^{[3]}	Country	Mildura	1947–1952; 1955–1962
Hayden Birrell	Liberal	Geelong	1961–1982
Hon John Bloomfield	Liberal	Malvern	1953–1970
Hon Henry Bolte	Liberal	Hampden	1947–1972
Bill Borthwick	Liberal	Scoresby	1960–1982
Hon Richard Brose	Country	Rodney	1944–1964
Vernon Christie	Liberal	Ivanhoe	1955–1973
Arthur Clarey	Labor	Melbourne	1955–1972
Leslie Cochrane	Country	Gippsland West	1950–1970
Roy Crick	Labor	Grant	1955–1966
Tom Darcy	Liberal	Polwarth	1958–1970
Bill Divers	Labor	Footscray	1958–1970
Roberts Dunstan	Liberal	Mornington	1956–1982
Bruce Evans	Country	Gippsland East	1961–1992
Tom Evans	Liberal	Ballarat North	1960–1988
Leo Fennessy	Labor	Brunswick East	1955–1970
Larry Floyd	Labor	Williamstown	1955–1973
Hon Alexander Fraser	Liberal	Caulfield	1950–1952; 1955–1965
Richard Gainey	Liberal	Elsternwick	1955–1967
Hon Bill Galvin	Labor	Bendigo	1945–1955, 1958–1964
Peter Garrisson	Liberal/Independent	Hawthorn	1958–1964
George Gibbs	Liberal	Portland	1955–1967
Max Gillett	Liberal	Geelong West	1958–1964
Jack Holden	Liberal	Moonee Ponds	1955–1967
Clyde Holding^{[1]}	Labor	Richmond	1962–1977
Kevin Holland	Labor	Flemington	1956–1967
Hon Sir Herbert Hyland	Country	Gippsland South	1929–1970
Harry Jenkins, Sr.	Labor	Reservoir	1961–1969
Harry Kane^{[2]}	Liberal	Broadmeadows	1955–1962
Denis Lovegrove	Labor	Fitzroy	1955–1973
Sam Loxton	Liberal	Prahran	1955–1979
Jim MacDonald	Liberal	Burwood	1955–1976
Hon Sir William McDonald	Liberal	Dundas	1947–1952; 1955–1970
Jim Manson	Liberal	Ringwood	1955–1973
Hon Edward Meagher	Liberal	Mentone	1955–1976
Hon Wilfred Mibus	Liberal	Lowan	1944–1964
Hon Tom Mitchell	Country	Benambra	1947–1976
Hon George Moss	Country	Murray Valley	1945–1973
Charlie Mutton	Labor	Coburg	1940–1967
Hon Horace Petty	Liberal	Toorak	1952–1964
Murray Porter	Liberal	Sandringham	1955–1970
Joe Rafferty	Liberal	Ormond	1955–1979
Hon George Reid	Liberal	Box Hill	1947–1952; 1955–1973
Len Reid	Liberal	Dandenong	1958–1969
Charlie Ring	Labor	Preston	1955–1970
John Rossiter	Liberal	Brighton	1955–1976
Hon Arthur Rylah	Liberal	Kew	1949–1971
Alan Scanlan	Liberal	Oakleigh	1961–1979
Roy Schintler	Labor	Yarraville	1955–1967
Gordon Scott	Liberal	Ballarat South	1955–1964
Baron Snider	Liberal	St Kilda	1955–1964
Harold Stirling	Country	Swan Hill	1952–1968
Russell Stokes	Liberal	Evelyn	1958–1973
Clive Stoneham	Labor	Midlands	1942–1970
Bob Suggett	Independent/Liberal ^{[4]}	Moorabbin	1955–1979
Keith Sutton	Labor	Albert Park	1950–1970
Edgar Tanner	Liberal	Ripponlea	1955–1976
Alex Taylor	Liberal	Balwyn	1955–1973
Bill Towers^{[1]}	Labor	Richmond	1947–1962
Tom Trewin	Country	Benalla	1961–1982
Campbell Turnbull	Labor	Brunswick West	1955–1973
Hon Keith Turnbull	Liberal	Kara Kara	1950–1964
Kenneth Wheeler	Liberal	Essendon	1958–1979
Milton Whiting^{[3]}	Country	Mildura	1962–1988
Vernon Wilcox	Liberal	Camberwell	1956–1976
Frank Wilkes	Labor	Northcote	1957–1988
John Wilton^{[2]}	Labor	Broadmeadows	1962–1985
Ray Wiltshire	Liberal	Mulgrave	1955–1976

^{1} On 18 March 1962, the Labor member for Richmond, Bill Towers, died. Labor candidate Clyde Holding won the resulting by-election on 12 May 1962.
^{2} On 30 May 1962, the Liberal member for Broadmeadows, Harry Kane, died. Labor candidate John Wilton won the resulting by-election on 4 August 1962.
^{3} On 11 September 1962, the Country member for Mildura, Nathaniel Barclay, died. Country candidate Milton Whiting won the resulting by-election on 27 October 1962.
^{4} Moorabbin MLA Bob Suggett had been re-elected as an Independent Liberal in 1961 after losing Liberal preselection before that election. He was readmitted to the Liberal Party in 1964.
