= Members of the Victorian Legislative Assembly, 1940–1943 =

- ←1937–1940 1943–1945→

This is a list of members of the Victorian Legislative Assembly from 1940 to 1943, as elected at the 1940 state election:

Name	Party	Electorate	Term in office
Albert Allnutt	Country	Mildura	1927–1945
Hon Sir Stanley Argyle ^{[3]}	United Australia	Toorak	1920–1940
Hon Henry Bailey	Country	Warrnambool	1914–1932, 1935–1950
Bill Barry	Labor	Carlton	1932–1955
Matthew Bennett	Country	Gippsland West	1929–1950
Ernie Bond	Labor	Port Fairy and Glenelg	1924–1943
Alexander Borthwick ^{[5]}	Country	Gippsland North	1938–1942
Fanny Brownbill	Labor	Geelong	1938–1948
John Cain	Labor	Northcote	1917–1957
Finlay Cameron	Country	Kara Kara and Borung	1935–1945
Col. Hon Harold Cohen	United Australia	Caulfield	1935–1943
Arthur Cook	Labor	Bendigo	1924–1945
Frederick Cook	McEwen Country	Benalla	1936–1961
Tom Corrigan ^{[4]}	Labor	Port Melbourne	1942–1952
Ted Cotter	Labor	Richmond	1908–1945
Ernest Coyle	Country	Waranga	1927–1943
Bert Cremean	Labor	Clifton Hill	1929–1945
William Cumming	United Australia	Hampden	1935–1945
Patrick Denigan	Labor	Allandale	1936–1945
Lot Diffey	Country	Wangaratta and Ovens	1929–1945
James Dillon	United Australia	Essendon	1932–1943
Keith Dodgshun	Country	Ouyen	1938–1955
Hon Albert Dunstan	Country	Korong and Eaglehawk	1920–1950
William Dunstone	Country	Rodney	1936–1944
John Ellis	United Australia	Prahran	1932–1945
William Everard	United Australia	Evelyn	1917–1950
Frank Field	Labor	Dandenong	1937–1947
George Frost ^{[6]}	Labor	Maryborough and Daylesford	1920–1942
Bill Fulton ^{[5]}	Country	Gippsland North	1942–1945; 1947–1952
Edward Guye ^{[2]}	Country	Polwarth	1940–1958
William Haworth	United Australia	Albert Park	1937–1945
Tom Hayes	Labor	Melbourne	1924–1955
Bill Hodson	Labor	Castlemaine and Kyneton	1940–1945
Leslie Hollins	Social Credit	Hawthorn	1940–1945
Hon Edmond Hogan	Country	Warrenheip and Grenville	1913–1943
Frederick Holden	Independent/Country	Grant	1932–1950
Jack Holland	Labor	Flemington	1925–1955
Thomas Hollway	United Australia	Ballarat	1932–1955
Col. Wilfrid Kent Hughes	United Australia	Kew	1927–1949
Hon Herbert Hyland	Country	Gippsland South	1929–1970
James Jewell	Labor	Brunswick	1910–1949
Frank Keane ^{[1]}	Labor	Coburg	1924–1940
Alfred Kirton	Country	Mornington	1932–1947
Brig. Sir George Knox	United Australia	Upper Yarra	1927–1960
Hamilton Lamb	Country	Lowan	1935–1943
Hon John Lemmon	Labor	Williamstown	1904–1955
Hon Albert Lind	Country	Gippsland East	1920–1961
Alec McDonald	Country	Stawell and Ararat	1935–1945
Allan McDonald ^{[2]}	United Australia	Polwarth	1933–1940
John McDonald	Country	Goulburn Valley	1936–1955
Ian Macfarlan	Independent	Brighton	1928–1945
William McKenzie	Labor	Wonthaggi	1927–1947
Edwin Mackrell	Country	Upper Goulburn	1920–1945
Thomas Maltby	United Australia	Barwon	1929–1961
Hon Norman Martin	Country	Gunbower	1934–1945
Archie Michaelis	United Australia	St Kilda	1932–1952
William Moncur	Country	Walhalla	1927–1945
Jack Mullens	Labor	Footscray	1937–1945
James Murphy ^{[4]}	Labor	Port Melbourne	1917–1942
Charlie Mutton ^{[1]}	Ind. Labor	Coburg	1940–1967
Hon Francis Old	Country	Swan Hill	1919–1945
Trevor Oldham	United Australia	Boroondara	1933–1953
Roy Paton	Country	Benambra	1932–1947
Squire Reid	Labor	Oakleigh	1927–1932; 1937–1947
Hon Bill Slater	Labor	Dundas	1917–1947
Clive Stoneham ^{[6]}	Labor	Maryborough and Daylesford	1942–1970
Harold Thonemann ^{[3]}	United Australia	Toorak	1941–1945
Hon Tom Tunnecliffe	Labor	Collingwood	1903–1904; 1907–1920; 1921–1947
Ivy Weber	Independent	Nunawading	1937–1943
Harry White	United Australia	Bulla and Dalhousie	1932–1943
Henry Zwar	United Australia	Heidelberg	1932–1945

^{1} On 15 May 1940, the Labor member for Coburg, Frank Keane, died. Independent Labor candidate Charlie Mutton, who had been expelled from the Labor Party for running against the endorsed candidate, won the resulting by-election on 13 July 1940.
^{2} In August 1940, the United Australia member for Polwarth, Allan McDonald, resigned to contest Division of Corangamite in the 1940 federal election. Country candidate Edward Guye won the resulting by-election on 2 November 1940.
^{3} On 23 November 1940, the United Australia member for Toorak, Sir Stanley Argyle, died. United Australia candidate Henry Thonemann won the resulting by-election on 11 January 1941.
^{4} On 17 February 1942, the Labor member for Port Melbourne, James Murphy, died. Labor candidate Tom Corrigan won the resulting by-election on 18 April 1942.
^{5} On 5 May 1942, the Country member for Gippsland North, Alexander Borthwick, died. Country candidate Bill Fulton won the resulting by-election on 20 June 1942.
^{6} On 26 October 1942, the Labor member for Maryborough and Daylesford, George Frost, died. Labor candidate Clive Stoneham won the resulting by-election on 28 November 1942.

== Sources ==
- "Find a Member". State Government of Victoria.
- Victorian Year Book, 1940–1941, page 42–43.
