= Members of the Victorian Legislative Assembly =

The following are lists of members of the Victorian Legislative Assembly:

- Members of the Victorian Legislative Assembly, 1856–1859
- Members of the Victorian Legislative Assembly, 1859–1861
- Members of the Victorian Legislative Assembly, 1861–1864
- Members of the Victorian Legislative Assembly, 1864–1865
- Members of the Victorian Legislative Assembly, 1866–1867
- Members of the Victorian Legislative Assembly, 1868–1871
- Members of the Victorian Legislative Assembly, 1871–1874
- Members of the Victorian Legislative Assembly, 1874–1877
- Members of the Victorian Legislative Assembly, 1877–1880
- Members of the Victorian Legislative Assembly, 1880–1880
- Members of the Victorian Legislative Assembly, 1880–1883
- Members of the Victorian Legislative Assembly, 1883–1886
- Members of the Victorian Legislative Assembly, 1886–1889
- Members of the Victorian Legislative Assembly, 1889–1892
- Members of the Victorian Legislative Assembly, 1892–1894
- Members of the Victorian Legislative Assembly, 1894–1897
- Members of the Victorian Legislative Assembly, 1897–1900
- Members of the Victorian Legislative Assembly, 1900–1902
- Members of the Victorian Legislative Assembly, 1902–1904
- Members of the Victorian Legislative Assembly, 1904–1907
- Members of the Victorian Legislative Assembly, 1907–1908
- Members of the Victorian Legislative Assembly, 1908–1911
- Members of the Victorian Legislative Assembly, 1911–1914
- Members of the Victorian Legislative Assembly, 1914–1917
- Members of the Victorian Legislative Assembly, 1917–1920
- Members of the Victorian Legislative Assembly, 1920–1921
- Members of the Victorian Legislative Assembly, 1921–1924
- Members of the Victorian Legislative Assembly, 1924–1927
- Members of the Victorian Legislative Assembly, 1927–1929
- Members of the Victorian Legislative Assembly, 1929–1932
- Members of the Victorian Legislative Assembly, 1932–1935
- Members of the Victorian Legislative Assembly, 1935–1937
- Members of the Victorian Legislative Assembly, 1937–1940
- Members of the Victorian Legislative Assembly, 1940–1943
- Members of the Victorian Legislative Assembly, 1943–1945
- Members of the Victorian Legislative Assembly, 1945–1947
- Members of the Victorian Legislative Assembly, 1947–1950
- Members of the Victorian Legislative Assembly, 1950–1952
- Members of the Victorian Legislative Assembly, 1952–1955
- Members of the Victorian Legislative Assembly, 1955–1958
- Members of the Victorian Legislative Assembly, 1958–1961
- Members of the Victorian Legislative Assembly, 1961–1964
- Members of the Victorian Legislative Assembly, 1964–1967
- Members of the Victorian Legislative Assembly, 1967–1970
- Members of the Victorian Legislative Assembly, 1970–1973
- Members of the Victorian Legislative Assembly, 1973–1976
- Members of the Victorian Legislative Assembly, 1976–1979
- Members of the Victorian Legislative Assembly, 1979–1982
- Members of the Victorian Legislative Assembly, 1982–1985
- Members of the Victorian Legislative Assembly, 1985–1988
- Members of the Victorian Legislative Assembly, 1988–1992
- Members of the Victorian Legislative Assembly, 1992–1996
- Members of the Victorian Legislative Assembly, 1996–1999
- Members of the Victorian Legislative Assembly, 1999–2002
- Members of the Victorian Legislative Assembly, 2002–2006
- Members of the Victorian Legislative Assembly, 2006–2010
- Members of the Victorian Legislative Assembly, 2010–2014
- Members of the Victorian Legislative Assembly, 2014–2018
- Members of the Victorian Legislative Assembly, 2018–2022
- Members of the Victorian Legislative Assembly, 2022–2026
