= Members of the Victorian Legislative Assembly, 1958–1961 =

- ←1955–1958 1961–1964→

This is a list of members of the Victorian Legislative Assembly from 1958 to 1961, as elected at the 1958 state election:

Name	Party	Electorate	Term in office
Jim Balfour	Liberal	Morwell	1955–1982
Nathaniel Barclay	Country	Mildura	1947–1952; 1955–1962
Hon John Bloomfield	Liberal	Malvern	1953–1970
Hon Henry Bolte	Liberal	Hampden	1947–1972
Bill Borthwick^{[2]}	Liberal	Scoresby	1960–1982
Hon Richard Brose	Country	Rodney	1944–1964
Vernon Christie	Liberal	Ivanhoe	1955–1973
Arthur Clarey	Labor	Melbourne	1955–1972
Leslie Cochrane	Country	Gippsland West	1950–1970
Frederick Cook	Country	Benalla	1936–1961
Roy Crick	Labor	Grant	1955–1966
Tom Darcy	Liberal	Polwarth	1958–1970
Bill Divers^{[1]}	Labor	Footscray	1958–1970
Hon Val Doube	Labor	Oakleigh	1950–1961; 1970–1979
Roberts Dunstan	Liberal	Mornington	1956–1982
Tom Evans^{[3]}	Liberal	Ballarat North	1960–1988
Leo Fennessy	Labor	Brunswick East	1955–1970
Larry Floyd	Labor	Williamstown	1955–1973
Hon Alexander Fraser	Liberal	Caulfield	1950–1952; 1955–1965
Richard Gainey	Liberal	Elsternwick	1955–1967
Hon Bill Galvin	Labor	Bendigo	1945–1955, 1958–1964
Peter Garrisson	Liberal	Hawthorn	1958–1964
George Gibbs	Liberal	Portland	1955–1967
Max Gillett	Liberal	Geelong West	1958–1964
Jack Holden	Liberal	Moonee Ponds	1955–1967
Kevin Holland	Labor	Flemington	1956–1967
Hon Sir Herbert Hyland	Country	Gippsland South	1929–1970
Harry Kane	Liberal	Broadmeadows	1955–1962
Brig. Hon Sir George Knox^{[1]}	Liberal	Scoresby	1927–1960
Hon Sir Albert Lind	Country	Gippsland East	1920–1961
Denis Lovegrove	Labor	Fitzroy	1955–1973
Sam Loxton	Liberal	Prahran	1955–1979
Jim MacDonald	Liberal	Burwood	1955–1976
Hon Sir William McDonald	Liberal	Dundas	1947–1952; 1955–1970
Hon Sir Thomas Maltby	Liberal	Geelong	1929–1961
Jim Manson	Liberal	Ringwood	1955–1973
Edward Meagher	Liberal	Mentone	1955–1976
Hon Wilfred Mibus	Liberal	Lowan	1944–1964
Hon Tom Mitchell	Country	Benambra	1947–1976
Hon George Moss	Country	Murray Valley	1945–1973
Charlie Mutton	Labor	Coburg	1940–1967
Hon Horace Petty	Liberal	Toorak	1952–1964
Murray Porter	Liberal	Sandringham	1955–1970
Joe Rafferty	Liberal	Ormond	1955–1979
Hon George Reid	Liberal	Box Hill	1947–1952; 1955–1973
Len Reid	Liberal	Dandenong	1958–1969
Charlie Ring	Labor	Preston	1955–1970
John Rossiter	Liberal	Brighton	1955–1976
William Ruthven	Labor	Reservoir	1945–1961
Hon Arthur Rylah	Liberal	Kew	1949–1971
Roy Schintler	Labor	Yarraville	1955–1967
Gordon Scott	Liberal	Ballarat South	1955–1964
Hon Ernie Shepherd^{[1]}	Labor	Footscray	1945–1968
Baron Snider	Liberal	St Kilda	1955–1964
Harold Stirling	Country	Swan Hill	1952–1968
Russell Stokes	Liberal	Evelyn	1958–1973
Clive Stoneham	Labor	Midlands	1942–1970
Bob Suggett	Liberal	Moorabbin	1955–1979
Keith Sutton	Labor	Albert Park	1950–1970
Edgar Tanner	Liberal	Ripponlea	1955–1976
Alex Taylor	Liberal	Balwyn	1955–1973
Bill Towers	Labor	Richmond	1947–1962
Campbell Turnbull	Labor	Brunswick West	1955–1973
Hon Keith Turnbull	Liberal	Kara Kara	1950–1964
Kenneth Wheeler	Liberal	Essendon	1958–1979
Hon Russell White^{[2]}	Country	Ballarat North	1945–1960
Vernon Wilcox	Liberal	Camberwell	1956–1976
Frank Wilkes	Labor	Northcote	1957–1988
Ray Wiltshire	Liberal	Mulgrave	1955–1976

^{1} On 12 September 1958, the Labor member for Footscray, Ernie Shepherd, died. Labor candidate Bill Divers won the resulting by-election on 8 October 1958.
^{2} On 11 July 1960, the Liberal member for Scoresby, George Knox, died. Liberal candidate Bill Borthwick won the resulting by-election on 17 September 1960.
^{3} In September 1960, the Country member for Ballarat North, Russell White, resigned to take up a position on the Trotting Control Board. Liberal candidate Tom Evans won the resulting by-election on 12 November 1960.
