= 1866 Victorian colonial election =

- 30 December 1865 to 29 January 1866

All 78 seats in the Victorian Legislative Assembly 40 seats needed for a majority
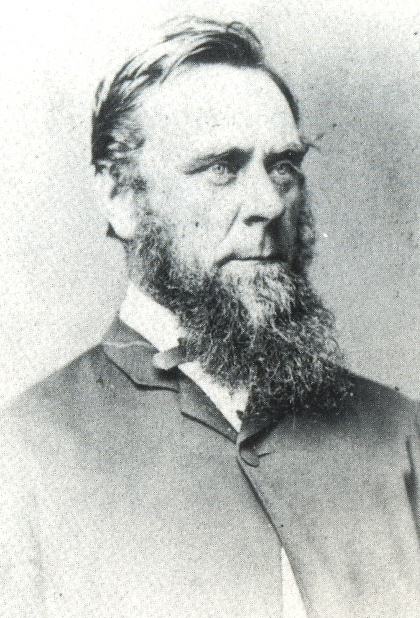

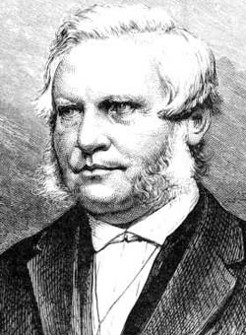
	First party	Second party
Leader	James McCulloch	Richard Ireland
Party	Moderate Liberal	Conservative (Free Trade)
Leader's seat	Mornington	Kilmore
Seats won	58	20
Percentage	63.38	36.62
Premier before election
James McCulloch
Liberal
Elected Premier
James McCulloch
Liberal

The 1866 Victorian colonial election was held from 30 December 1865 to 29 January 1866 to elect the 5th Parliament of Victoria. All 78 seats in 49 electorates in the Legislative Assembly were up for election, though ten seats were uncontested.

There were 24 single-member, 21 two-member and 4 three-member electorates.

The 1866 general election was called when the Legislative Council rejected the McCulloch government's bill for a protective tariff and the Governor, Sir Charles Darling, agreed to a dissolution of parliament over the issue. McCulloch and his protectionist supporters easily won the election and remained in office throughout this parliament.

== Results ==
Legislative Assembly (FPTP)
Party / Grouping	Votes	%	Swing	Seats	Change
Ministerial	52,754	63.38		58	
Opposition	30,476	36.62		20	
Totals	83,230			78	

== Aftermath ==
The new assembly was sworn in on 12 February 1866. A Bill of Supply, with tariff legislation included, was passed in the assembly and submitted to the Upper House. The Legislative Council rejected the bill, which effectively stopped Government supply. McCulloch and his ministry resigned in protest at the continual obstruction by the Legislative Council dominated by conservative free-trade pastoralists. Governor Darling requested that leading opposition figure, Legislative Council member Thomas H. Fellows, form a ministry, but negotiations about the conditions of accepting the responsibility proved insurmountable. In late March 1866 McCulloch agreed to an interim measure whereby he and his colleagues would continue to administer their departments despite not being formally appointed.

Governor Darling had been a consistent supporter of McCulloch's ministry in its efforts to introduce protectionist legislation. In December 1865 a petition of complaint protesting the Governor's behaviour had been sent to the Queen by council members. In mid-April 1866 news reached the colony that Darling was to be recalled as Governor of Victoria by the British government. The dismissal of Governor Darling broke the deadlock. A conference of representatives from both houses negotiated an acceptable compromise. Within days outstanding Appropriation Bills for the previous two years were passed by the Upper House, as well as an advance of sixty thousand pounds for 1866.

During public expressions of support for the ousted Governor, a select committee of the parliament recommended a grant of £20,000 be made to Lady Darling to compensate for the "heavy pecuniary loss" sustained due to the Governor's recall for political reasons. In February 1867 the McCulloch government was advised that Lady Darling's acceptance of the proposed grant would be contrary to the regulations of the colonial service. In England Darling resigned from the service to bypass colonial regulations and enable the grant to be accepted. In April 1867 a vote for the £20,000 grant to Lady Darling was passed in the Legislative Assembly, but subsequently rejected by the Upper House. In August 1867 the grant to Lady Darling was included in the supplementary estimates of expenditure in the annual Appropriation Bill, but in October the Legislative Council rejected the bill, claiming that such a grant ought to have been the subject of a separate measure.

After a temporary Supply Bill was rejected in the Upper House in early November the parliament was prorogued. Its dissolution was gazetted on 30 December 1867, with a general election to commence in late-January 1868.

== See also ==
- Members of the Victorian Legislative Assembly, 1866–1867
