= Charles Don =

Australian politician

Charles Jardine Don (12 June 1820 – 27 September 1866) was a politician in colonial Victoria, Australia.

Don was born in Coupar Angus, Perthshire, Scotland, son of William Don and his wife Jeanette, née Rattery. Don was apprenticed to a hand-loom weaver. He took part in the Chartist movement in 1842, and in 1853 emigrated to Victoria, where he worked as a stonemason.

Don was returned to the Victorian Legislative Assembly for Collingwood in October 1859 and 1861, losing the 1864 election. Don, who was regarded as a working-class champion, and who was a strenuous advocate of the liberalisation of the land laws. Don died in Collingwood, Victoria on 27 September 1866, survived by a daughter of his first marriage and a son.
