= Nathaniel Levi =

Australian politician

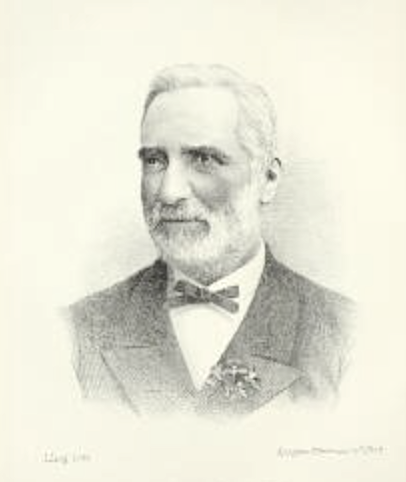
- Nathaniel Levi, c. 1887
- Born: 20 January 1830; Liverpool, Lancashire, England
- Died: 11 September 1908 (aged 78); St Kilda, Victoria, Australia
- Occupations: auctioneer, company director, distiller, politician
- Spouse: Sarah nee Levy

Legislative Assembly of Victoria representative for Maryborough
- In office 1860–1865

Legislative Assembly of Victoria representative for East Melbourne
- In office 1866–1868

Legislative Council of Victoria representative for North Yarra Province
- In office 1892–1904

"On Zionism, its aim and objects", an Address by Nathaniel Levi, 1906

Nathaniel Levi (20 January 1830 – 1908) was a Jewish-Australian politician and businessman.

== Biography ==
Levi was born in Liverpool, England on 20 January 1830. He left England in December 1852, and arrived at Hobson's Bay on 27 April 1854 on the Matilda Wattenbach. He rented property on Collins and Queens Streets and worked as an auctioneer until 1858 when he joined a firm of "wine, spirit, and general merchants" called John Levy and Sons.

In 1858, Levi ran for Parliament to represent the constituency of Maryborough but lost by 14 votes. When Richard Davies Ireland was appointed Attorney-General, Levi contested the election for his vacant seat. He became the first Jewish member of the Victorian Parliament when he was first elected in 1860.

He represented the electorates of Maryborough for 5 years before he became the representative for East Melbourne. He later represented the electorate of North Yarra.

In 1865, Levi opened a distillery in Footscray and started cultivating sugar and spirits from beetroot.

Levi was prominent in the Jewish community, and was the president of the Melbourne Hebrew Congregation in 1880–82 and 1904–05, and president of the Melbourne Hebrew School.

== Personal life ==
In 1855, Levy married John Levy's daughter, Sarah. She died in 1864.

Levi was the forebear of prominent rabbi, John Levi, one of the founders of Melbourne's King David School.
