= Ambrose Kyte =

Australian politician

Member of the Victorian Legislative Assembly
- In office January 1867 – December 1867
- Preceded by: Archibald Wardrop
- Succeeded by: James Harcourt
- Constituency: Richmond
- In office August 1861 – December 1865
- Preceded by: Graham Berry
- Succeeded by: Edward Langton
- Constituency: East Melbourne

Personal details
- Born: c. 1822; Nenagh, County Tipperary, Ireland
- Died: 16 November 1868 (aged 45–46); Carlton, Victoria, Australia
- Spouse: Sarah Ann Finnin (m. 1842)

Ambrose Henry Spencer Kyte (c. 1822 – 16 November 1868) was a merchant and politician in colonial Victoria (Australia).

Kyte was born in Nenagh, Tipperary, Ireland, the son of Stephen Kyte and his wife Margaret, née Mitchell.

Kyte arrived in Melbourne in January 1840, finding work as a brewer's labourer. Kyte opened a hay and corn store in Bourke Street, Melbourne in 1845, later he expanded into general merchandise and invested in urban properties.

In September 1858 Kyte offered a sum of £1000 towards the expenses of an exploring expedition to cross the Australian continent from south to north. This led to the despatch of the ill-fated Burke and Wills expedition in August 1860.

In August 1861 Kyte stood for East Melbourne as a candidate for the Victorian Legislative Assembly, and defeated Edward Langton, who in February 1866 defeated him in a contest for the same constituency. Kyte represented Richmond from January 1867 to December 1867.

In April 1866, he donated £10 for poor relief in Nenagh, which led the town commissioners to unanimously pass a resolution thanking him.

Kyte died in Carlton, Victoria on 16 November 1868, survived by his wife, a son and two daughters.
