= Robert McGregor (Australian politician) =

English-born Australian politician

Robert McGregor (1853 – 6 August 1931) was an English-born Australian politician.

McGregor was born in Lambeth to blacksmith Charles McGregor and Isabel McPhee. He came to Victoria at a young age and was educated in Ballarat. He became a business agent and auctioneer, and married Mary Laurie, with whom he had nine children.

In 1894 McGregor was elected to the Victorian Legislative Assembly for Ballarat East. He was a minister without portfolio from 19 November 1900 to 12 February 1901, and from 12 February 1901 to 10 June 1902 was Vice-President of the Board of Land and Works. He was Chairman of Committees from 1918 to 1921, but he lost his seat in May 1924. McGregor died in Melbourne in 1931.

Victorian Legislative Assembly
Preceded by John Dunn	Member for Ballarat East; 1894–1924	Succeeded by William McAdam
