= Electoral district of Malvern =

State electoral district of Victoria, Australia

Malvern Victoria—Legislative Assembly
- Interactive map of electoral district boundaries from the 2022 state election
- State: Victoria
- Created: 1945
- MP: Michael O'Brien
- Party: Liberal Party
- Namesake: Malvern
- Electors: 42,898 (2018)
- Area: 20 km^{2} (7.7 sq mi)
- Demographic: Metropolitan

The electoral district of Malvern is an electorate of the Victorian Legislative Assembly. It contains the suburbs of Malvern, Armadale, Kooyong, Malvern East, Toorak, and parts of Glen Iris.

The electorate has been held by the Liberal Party (or its predecessor) since its creation in 1945, and for most of that time has been regarded as one of the Liberal Party's safest seats in Melbourne. In all but one election, the Liberals have won enough votes on the first count to win the seat outright. As a measure of how safe Malvern is for the Liberals, Opposition Leader Robert Doyle easily retained the seat with 60.2% of the two-party vote even as Labor won its biggest majority ever at the state level.

The current member is Michael O'Brien, who succeeded Doyle at the 2006 Victorian election and served as Treasurer in the Napthine government. At the 2014 state election, O'Brien's margin over Labor was 16.3%, down from 20.6%, but his margin was reduced to 6.1% at the 2018 state election. On 6 December 2018 O’Brien was elected leader of the Liberal Party and became Opposition Leader, a role he served until September 2021.

The seat's best-known member was Lindsay Thompson, who served as Premier of Victoria from 1981 to 1982 and served as a minister without interruption from 1958 to 1982 – one of the longest-serving state ministers in Australian history.

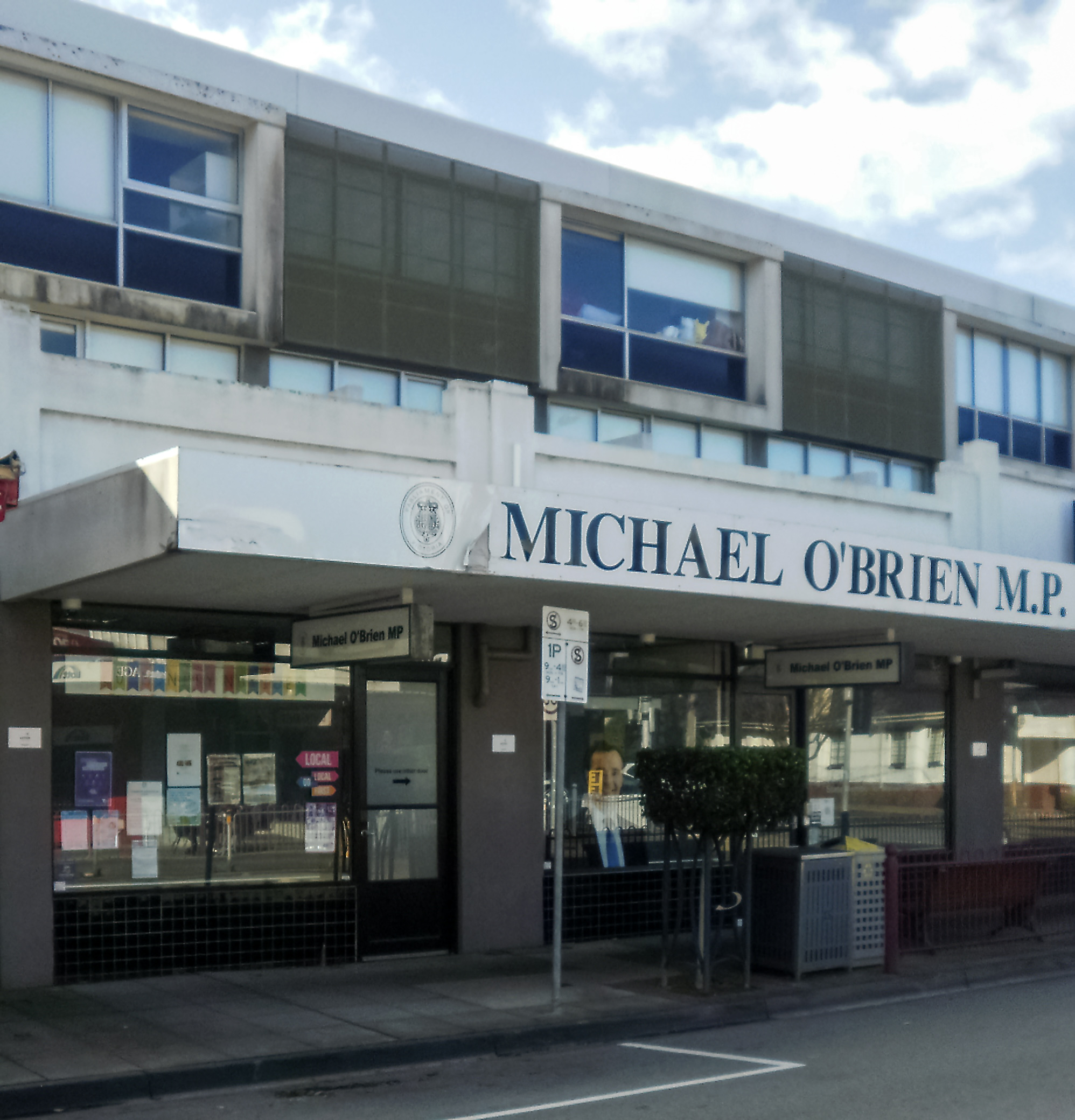
O'Brien's Electoral Office in Malvern East

== Members for Malvern ==
Member	Party	Term
Trevor Oldham	Liberal	1945–1953
Sir John Bloomfield	Liberal	1953–1970
Lindsay Thompson	Liberal	1970–1982
Geoff Leigh	Liberal	1982–1992
Robert Doyle	Liberal	1992–2006
Michael O'Brien	Liberal	2006–present

Oldham represented Boroondara 1933–1945

== Election results ==
2022 Victorian state election: Malvern
Party	Candidate	Votes	%	±%
Liberal	Michael O'Brien	20,768	52.8	+1.5
Labor	Darren Natale	10,266	26.1	−3.4
Greens	Mitchell Fuller	6,137	15.6	+2.5
Animal Justice	Amelia Natoli	960	2.5	−0.4
Independent	Steve Stefanopoulos	602	1.5	+1.5
Family First	Judy Schmidt	601	1.5	+1.5
Total formal votes		40,791	97.3	+1.3
Informal votes		1,146	2.7	−1.3
Turnout		41,937	89.5	+0.5
Two-party-preferred result
Liberal	Michael O'Brien	23,685	58.1	+2.0
Labor	Darren Natale	17,106	41.9	−2.0
Liberal hold		Swing	+2.0	
