= Electoral district of Ballarat East =

State electoral district of Victoria, Australia

Ballarat East Victoria—Legislative Assembly
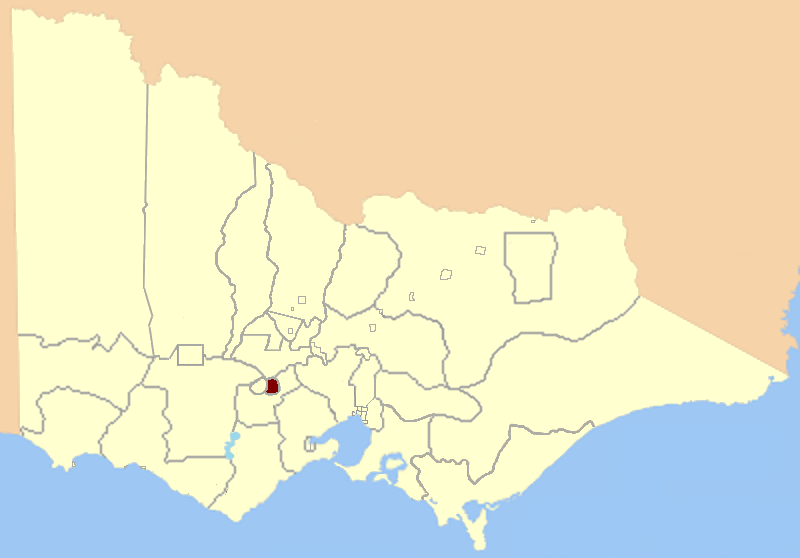
- Location in Victoria, 1859
- State: Victoria
- Dates current: 1859–1927, 1992–2014
- Electors: 40,578 (2010)
- Area: 3,323 km^{2} (1,283.0 sq mi)
- Demographic: Urbanised rural
- Coordinates: 37°33′S 144°04′E

Ballarat East (initially spelt Ballaarat East) was an electoral district of the Legislative Assembly in the Australian state of Victoria. Prior to its abolition, it was a 3,323 km² part-urban and part-rural electorate covering areas to the east of the regional centre of Ballarat. It included the Ballarat suburbs of Ballarat East, Bakery Hill, Golden Point, Eureka, Canadian, Mount Pleasant, Mount Clear, Mount Helen and Warrenheip, and the rural towns of Ballan, Buninyong, Bungaree, Creswick, Daylesford, Dunnstown, Hepburn Springs, Kyneton, Lal Lal, Malmsbury, Meredith and Steiglitz. The electorate had a population of 54,127 as of the 2006 census, with 40,578 enrolled electors at the 2010 state election.

Ballarat East was one of the earliest districts of the Legislative Assembly, having been created for the second Assembly election in 1859. It was initially a two-member seat, and as with the rest of the Assembly, was largely non-partisan until 1889, when it became a one-member electorate and began to be held by more partisan figures. It was held by successive early liberal parties until they merged into the Nationalist Party of Australia in the late 1910s, but fell to the Labor Party in 1924, one term before being abolished in 1927. It was recreated as a marginal seat in 1992, when it was won by Liberal Barry Traynor, but was regained for Labor by Geoff Howard when the party won office at the 1999 election. Howard was re-elected at the 2002 election, 2006 election and 2010 election.

Ballarat East was abolished in 2014 after a redistribution of Victoria's electoral boundaries, with much of its territory going to the new district of Buninyong.

== Members for Ballarat East ==
First incarnation (1859–1927)
Member 1	Party	Term	Member 2	Party	Term
John Humffray	Unaligned	1859–1864	John Cathie	Unaligned	1859–1864
Charles Jones	Unaligned	1864–1867	Charles Dyte	Unaligned	1864–1871
John Humffray	Unaligned	1868–1871	Charles Dyte	Unaligned	1864–1871
John James	Unaligned	1871–1886	Robert Walsh	Unaligned	1871–1874
John James	Unaligned	1871–1886	Townsend McDermott	Unaligned	1874–1877
John James	Unaligned	1871–1886	Daniel Brophy	Unaligned	1877–1880
John James	Unaligned	1871–1886	James Russell	Unaligned	1880
John James	Unaligned	1871–1886	Daniel Brophy	Unaligned	1880–1883
Edward Murphy	Unaligned	1886–1889	James Russell	Unaligned	1883–1889
John Dunn	Comm Liberal	1889–1894	One Member (1889–1927)		
Robert McGregor	Comm Liberal	1894–1924			
Robert McGregor	Nationalist	1894–1924			
William McAdam	Labor	1924–1927			

McAdam went on to represent the new Electoral district of Ballarat from 1927.

Second incarnation (1992–2014)
Member	Party	Term
Barry Traynor	Liberal	1992–1999
Geoff Howard	Labor	1999–2014

== Election results ==
2010 Victorian state election: Ballarat East
Party	Candidate	Votes	%	±%
Liberal	Ben Taylor	15,758	43.40	+9.80
Labor	Geoff Howard	14,076	38.77	−4.18
Greens	Linda Zibell	5,363	14.77	+3.01
Family First	Gary Greville	1,109	3.05	−2.03
Total formal votes		36,306	95.69	−0.47
Informal votes		1,636	4.31	+0.47
Turnout		37,942	93.50	+1.58
Two-party-preferred result
Labor	Geoff Howard	18,702	51.51	−5.13
Liberal	Ben Taylor	17,604	48.49	+5.13
Labor hold		Swing	−5.13	
