= Electoral district of Hampden =

Former state electoral district of Victoria, Australia

Coordinates: 37°59′S 143°00′E

Hampden Victoria—Legislative Assembly
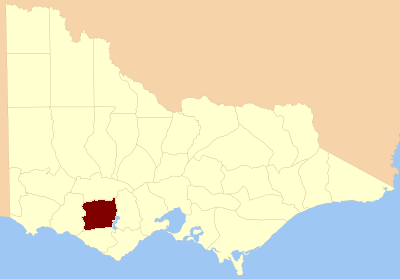
- County of Hampden
- State: Victoria
- Created: 1904
- Abolished: 1976
- Namesake: County of Hampden
- Demographic: Rural

Hampden was an electoral district of the Legislative Assembly in the Australian state of Victoria from 1904 until its abolition in 1976. Most of the territory located in the old division of Hampden was transferred into the re-created electorate of Ripon. Hampden's most notable member was the longest serving Premier of Victoria Sir Henry Bolte. The seat was historically a conservative bastion, having never been won by Labor for more than one term.

== Members for Hampden ==
Member	Party	Term
David Oman	Commonwealth Liberal	1904–1927
David Oman	Nationalist	1904–1927
Arthur Hughes	Labor	1927–1929
Chester Manifold	Nationalist	1929–1935
Chester Manifold	United Australia	1929–1935
William Cumming	United Australia	1935–1945
Raymond Hyatt	Labor	1945–1947
Henry Bolte	Liberal / LCP ^{[a]}	1947–1972
Tom Austin	Liberal	1972–1976
