= Electoral district of Collingwood =

Former state electoral district of Victoria, Australia

Coordinates: 37°47′45″S 144°59′30″E

Collingwood Victoria—Legislative Assembly
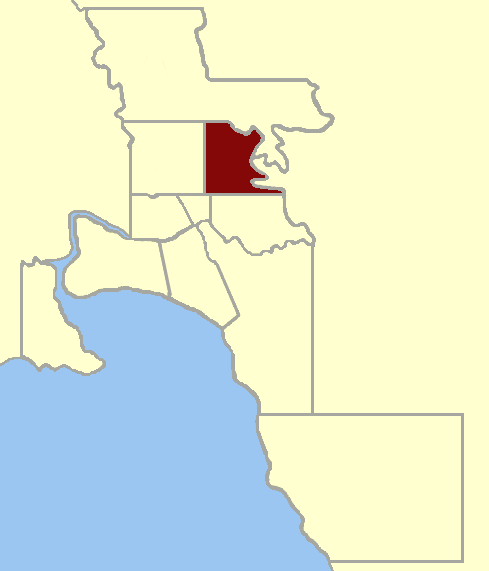
- Location within Greater Melbourne area, 1859
- State: Victoria
- Created: 1856
- Abolished: 1958

Collingwood was an electoral district of the Legislative Assembly in the Australian state of Victoria from 1856 to 1958. It centred on the Melbourne suburb of Collingwood, Victoria.

The district of Collingwood was one of the initial districts of the first Victorian Legislative Assembly, 1856.

It was defined initially as:

Commencing at the Junction of Nicholson Street and Victoria Parade, thence by the Western side of Nicholson Street to the Northern Boundary of the Corporate Limits of Melbourne, thence on the North by the said Boundary Line bearing East to the Merri Merri Creek, thence by the Merri Merri Creek to its Junction with the Yarra Yarra River, thence by the Yarra Yarra River to the South-east Corner of Section No. 63, Parish of Jika Jika, thence by a Line West to Victoria Street, and thence on the South by the Northern Side of Victoria Street and Victoria Parade to the commencing Point.

== Members for Collingwood ==
The district initially had two members, which was increased to three from 1859, reverted to two after 1877, and was represented by only one member from 1904.

Member 1	Term	Member 2	Term		
Thomas Embling	Nov 1856 – July 1861	George Harker	Nov 1856 – Aug 1859	Member 3	Term
Thomas Embling	Nov 1856 – July 1861	George Milner Stephen	Oct 1859 – July 1861	Charles Jardine Don	Oct 1859 – Aug 1864
Graham Berry	Aug 1861 – Dec 1865	John Edwards	Aug 1861 – Dec 1867	George Harker	Nov 1864 – Dec 1865
Thomas Embling	Feb 1866 – Dec 1867	John Edwards	Aug 1861 – Dec 1867	Isaac Reeves	Feb 1866 – Oct 1869
John Everard	Mar 1868 – Feb 1871	William Bates	Mar 1868 – Mar 1874	Isaac Reeves	Feb 1866 – Oct 1869
George Harker	Apr 1871 – Mar 1874	William Bates	Mar 1868 – Mar 1874	William Vale	Oct 1869^{[b]} – Mar 1874
John Everard	May 1874 – July 1874	James Forester Sullivan	May 1874 – Feb 1876	Albert Lee Tucker	May 1874 – Apr 1877
George David Langridge	Aug 1874^{[b]} – Mar 1891				
George David Langridge	Aug 1874^{[b]} – Mar 1891	James Mirams	Feb 1876 – Feb 1886		
George David Langridge	Aug 1874^{[b]} – Mar 1891	William Guard Feild	Mar 1886 – Mar 1889		
John Hancock	Jun 1891^{[b]} – Apr 1892	William Beazley	Apr 1889 – May 1904		
Edgar Wilkins	May 1892 – Dec 1908	William Beazley	Apr 1889 – May 1904		

Single Member District
Member	Party	Term
Martin Hannah	Labor	1908 – 1920
Martin Hannah	Independent	1920 – 1921
Tom Tunnecliffe	Labor	1921 – 1947
Bill Towers	Labor	1947^{[b]} – 1958

^{[b]} = by-election
