= Electoral results for the district of Coburg =

Australian district election results

This is a list of electoral results for the electoral district of Coburg in Victorian state elections.

== Members for Coburg ==
Member	Party	Term
Frank Keane	Labor Party	1927–1940
Charlie Mutton	Independent	1940–1947
Charlie Mutton	Blackburn-Mutton Labor Party	1947–1950
Charlie Mutton	Progressive Labor Party	1950–1955
Charlie Mutton	Labor Party	1955–1967
Jack Mutton	Independent	1967–1979
Peter Gavin	Labor Party	1979–1992
Tom Roper	Labor Party	1992–1994
Carlo Carli	Labor Party	1994–2002

== Election results ==
=== Elections in the 1990s ===
==== 1999 ====
1999 Victorian state election: Coburg
Party	Candidate	Votes	%	±%
Labor	Carlo Carli	18,877	64.7	−0.3
Liberal	Mark Hrycek	7,765	26.6	−3.9
Greens	Emma Rush	2,547	8.7	+8.7
Total formal votes		29,189	95.9	−1.0
Informal votes		1,248	4.1	+1.0
Turnout		30,437	86.1	−6.0
Two-party-preferred result
Labor	Carlo Carli	20,951	71.8	+4.9
Liberal	Mark Hrycek	8,232	28.2	−4.9
Labor hold		Swing	+4.9	

==== 1996 ====
1996 Victorian state election: Coburg
Party	Candidate	Votes	%	±%
Labor	Carlo Carli	19,934	65.0	+14.1
Liberal	Dino De Marchi	9,348	30.5	+1.4
Natural Law	Martin Richardson	1,405	4.6	+2.1
Total formal votes		30,687	96.9	+2.8
Informal votes		982	3.1	−2.8
Turnout		31,669	92.1	−0.2
Two-party-preferred result
Labor	Carlo Carli	20,509	66.9	+5.7
Liberal	Dino De Marchi	10,140	33.1	−5.7
Labor hold		Swing	+5.7	

==== 1994 by-election ====
1994 Coburg state by-election
Party	Candidate	Votes	%	±%
Labor	Carlo Carli	13,691	52.8	+2.0
Independent	Sam Ganci	5,976	23.0	+23.0
Greens	Andrea Sharam	5,368	20.7	+20.7
Independent	Gilbert Boffa	906	3.5	+3.5
Total formal votes		25,941	91.8	−2.2
Informal votes		2,304	8.2	+2.2
Turnout		28,245	85.0	
Two-candidate-preferred result
Labor	Carlo Carli	17,188	66.3	+5.1
Independent	Sam Ganci	8,738	33.7	+33.7
Labor hold		Swing	N/A	

==== 1992 ====
1992 Victorian state election: Coburg
Party	Candidate	Votes	%	±%
Labor	Tom Roper	14,662	50.8	−11.6
Liberal	Ross Lazzaro	8,394	29.1	+2.2
Independent	Norma Willoughby	2,396	8.3	+2.8
Pensioner and CIR	Katheryne Savage	1,506	5.2	+5.2
Independent	Jeff Sullivan	1,165	4.0	+4.0
Natural Law	Byron Rigby	725	2.5	+2.5
Total formal votes		28,848	94.1	+1.0
Informal votes		1,813	5.9	−1.0
Turnout		30,661	92.3	
Two-party-preferred result
Labor	Tom Roper	17,569	61.2	−4.5
Liberal	Ross Lazzaro	11,142	38.8	+4.5
Labor hold		Swing	−4.5	

=== Elections in the 1980s ===
==== 1988 ====
1988 Victorian state election: Coburg
Party	Candidate	Votes	%	±%
Labor	Peter Gavin	15,353	61.27	−9.17
Liberal	Erdem Aydin	5,911	23.59	−5.97
Independent	Norma Willoughby	3,793	15.14	+15.14
Total formal votes		25,057	93.70	−2.35
Informal votes		1,685	6.30	+2.35
Turnout		26,742	91.16	−1.48
Two-party-preferred result
Labor	Peter Gavin	16,364	65.31	−5.13
Liberal	Erdem Aydin	8,691	34.69	+5.13
Labor hold		Swing	−5.13	

==== 1985 ====
1985 Victorian state election: Coburg
Party	Candidate	Votes	%	±%
Labor	Peter Gavin	19,235	70.4	−2.4
Liberal	Antonino Boeti	8,070	29.6	+11.7
Total formal votes		27,305	96.0	
Informal votes		1,124	4.0	
Turnout		28,429	92.6	
Labor hold		Swing	−5.3	

==== 1982 ====
1982 Victorian state election: Coburg
Party	Candidate	Votes	%	±%
Labor	Peter Gavin	18,656	70.2	+24.5
Liberal	Bozidar Jovanovic	5,464	20.5	+2.5
Independent	Ernest Hadley	2,476	9.3	+9.3
Total formal votes		26,596	96.1	+2.5
Informal votes		1,067	3.9	−2.5
Turnout		27,663	94.3	−0.5
Two-party-preferred result
Labor	Peter Gavin	19,894	74.8	+5.3
Liberal	Bozidar Jovanovic	6,702	25.2	−5.3
Labor hold		Swing	+5.3	

=== Elections in the 1970s ===
==== 1979 ====
1979 Victorian state election: Coburg
Party	Candidate	Votes	%	±%
Labor	Peter Gavin	11,647	45.7	+2.4
Independent	Jack Mutton	7,183	28.2	−0.3
Liberal	Nicholas Kosenko	4,602	18.0	−5.1
Democrats	Kenneth Goss	840	3.3	+3.3
Democratic Labor	John Flint	801	3.1	−2.0
Independent	Raymond Berbling	439	1.7	+1.7
Total formal votes		25,512	93.6	−3.0
Informal votes		1,751	6.4	+3.0
Turnout		27,263	94.8	+1.2
Two-party-preferred result
Labor	Peter Gavin	17,731	69.5	+3.0
Liberal	Nicholas Kosenko	7,781	30.5	−3.0
Two-candidate-preferred result
Labor	Peter Gavin	13,072	51.2	+6.6
Independent	Jack Mutton	12,440	48.8	−6.6
Labor gain from Independent		Swing	+6.6	

==== 1976 ====
1976 Victorian state election: Coburg
Party	Candidate	Votes	%	±%
Labor	Peter Gavin	11,324	43.3	−1.2
Independent	Jack Mutton	7,452	28.5	+8.6
Liberal	Nicholas Kosenko	6,044	23.1	−2.0
Democratic Labor	Helen Hart	1,336	5.1	−5.4
Total formal votes		26,156	96.6	
Informal votes		931	3.4	
Turnout		27,087	93.6	
Two-candidate-preferred result
Independent	Jack Mutton	14,478	55.3	+2.4
Labor	Peter Gavin	11,678	44.7	−2.4
Independent hold		Swing	+2.4	

==== 1973 ====
1973 Victorian state election: Coburg
Party	Candidate	Votes	%	±%
Labor	Frank Cox	8,581	39.8	+1.0
Independent	Jack Mutton	6,156	28.5	+1.2
Liberal	Louis Mingaars	5,046	23.4	+1.6
Democratic Labor	Timothy Gerrard	1,806	8.4	−3.9
Total formal votes		21,589	95.7	−0.1
Informal votes		967	4.3	+0.1
Turnout		22,556	95.6	+0.5
Two-candidate-preferred result
Independent	Jack Mutton	12,505	57.9	−1.0
Labor	Frank Cox	9,084	42.1	+1.0
Independent hold		Swing	−1.0	

==== 1970 ====
1970 Victorian state election: Coburg
Party	Candidate	Votes	%	±%
Labor	Frank Cox	8,236	38.8	−1.0
Independent	Jack Mutton	5,728	27.3	+6.4
Liberal	Joan Mathieson	4,627	21.8	−2.8
Democratic Labor	Peter McCabe	2,616	12.3	−2.5
Total formal votes		21,207	95.8	+0.1
Informal votes		931	4.2	−0.1
Turnout		22,138	95.1	−0.4
Two-candidate-preferred result
Independent	Jack Mutton	12,480	58.8	+0.4
Labor	Frank Cox	8,727	41.2	−0.4
Independent hold		Swing	+0.4	

=== Elections in the 1960s ===
==== 1967 ====
1967 Victorian state election: Coburg
Party	Candidate	Votes	%	±%
Labor	Bill Brown	8,680	39.8	−14.2
Liberal	Charles Symons	5,366	24.6	−1.7
Independent	Jack Mutton	4,548	20.9	+20.9
Democratic Labor	John Hardy	3,216	14.7	−5.0
Total formal votes		21,810	95.7	
Informal votes		982	4.3	
Turnout		22,792	95.5	
Two-party-preferred result
Labor	Bill Brown	12,940	59.3	−2.4
Liberal	Charles Symons	8,870	40.7	+2.4
Two-candidate-preferred result
Independent	Jack Mutton	12,480	58.8	+58.8
Labor	Bill Brown	8,727	41.2	−15.7
Independent gain from Labor		Swing	N/A	

==== 1964 ====
1964 Victorian state election: Coburg
Party	Candidate	Votes	%	±%
Labor	Charlie Mutton	10,989	56.9	−1.9
Liberal and Country	John Knight	4,629	24.0	+3.7
Democratic Labor	John Hardy	3,703	19.2	−1.7
Total formal votes		19,321	97.1	+0.1
Informal votes		569	2.9	−0.1
Turnout		19,890	94.9	−0.3
Two-party-preferred result
Labor	Charlie Mutton	11,544	59.7	−2.2
Liberal and Country	John Knight	7,777	40.3	+2.2
Labor hold		Swing	−2.2	

==== 1961 ====
1961 Victorian state election: Coburg
Party	Candidate	Votes	%	±%
Labor	Charlie Mutton	11,658	58.8	−3.6
Democratic Labor	John Livingstone	4,149	20.9	+5.9
Liberal and Country	Bryce Pyatt	4,036	20.3	−2.2
Total formal votes		19,843	97.0	−1.1
Informal votes		617	3.0	+1.1
Turnout		20,460	95.2	−0.2
Two-party-preferred result
Labor	Charlie Mutton	12,280	61.9	−2.8
Liberal and Country	Bryce Pyatt	7,563	38.1	+2.8
Labor hold		Swing	−2.8	

- The two candidate preferred vote was not counted between the Labor and DLP candidates for Coburg.

=== Elections in the 1950s ===
==== 1958 ====
1958 Victorian state election: Coburg
Party	Candidate	Votes	%	±%
Labor	Charlie Mutton	12,801	62.4	
Liberal and Country	Peter Robertson	4,623	22.5	
Democratic Labor	Kevin O'Dea	3,078	15.0	
Total formal votes		20,502	98.1	
Informal votes		399	1.9	
Turnout		20,901	95.4	
Two-party-preferred result
Labor	Charlie Mutton	13,263	64.7	
Liberal and Country	Peter Robertson	7,239	35.3	
Labor gain from Independent		Swing	N/A	

- Mutton was elected as an Independent in the 1955 election, but joined the Labor party in 1956.
- Two party preferred vote was estimated.

==== 1955 ====
1955 Victorian state election: Coburg
Party	Candidate	Votes	%	±%
Progressive Labor	Charlie Mutton	11,809	53.2	
Liberal and Country	Donald Abernethy	5,711	25.7	
Labor (A-C)	Kevin Hayes	4,665	21.0	
Total formal votes		22,185	98.2	
Informal votes		415	1.8	
Turnout		22,600	94.8	
Two-candidate-preferred result
Progressive Labor	Charlie Mutton	12,975	58.5	
Liberal and Country	Donald Abernethy	9,210	41.5	
Progressive Labor hold		Swing		

==== 1952 ====
1952 Victorian state election: Coburg
Party	Candidate	Votes	%	±%
Progressive Labor	Charlie Mutton	12,617	53.6	+20.8
Labor	Kevin Hayes	10,927	46.4	+7.4
Total formal votes		23,544	98.3	−0.7
Informal votes		404	1.7	+0.7
Turnout		23,948	94.1	−1.6
Progressive Labor hold		Swing	−4.4	

==== 1950 ====
1950 Victorian state election: Coburg
Party	Candidate	Votes	%	±%
Labor	Kevin Hayes	9,462	39.0	+10.4
Blackburn-Mutton Labor	Charlie Mutton	7,977	32.8	−5.7
Liberal and Country	John Morris	6,852	28.2	−4.6
Total formal votes		24,291	99.0	+0.3
Informal votes		236	1.0	−0.3
Turnout		24,527	95.7	+1.0
Two-candidate-preferred result
Blackburn-Mutton Labor	Charlie Mutton	14,085	58.0	−7.3
Labor	Kevin Hayes	10,206	42.0	+7.3
Blackburn-Mutton Labor hold		Swing	−7.3	

=== Elections in the 1940s ===
==== 1947 ====
1947 Victorian state election: Coburg
Party	Candidate	Votes	%	±%
Blackburn-Mutton Labor	Charlie Mutton	9,223	38.5	−13.6
Liberal	Walter Perse	7,859	32.8	+9.6
Labor	George Henderson	6,850	28.6	+5.4
Total formal votes		23,932	98.7	+0.3
Informal votes		325	1.3	−0.3
Turnout		24,257	94.7	+7.0
Two-candidate-preferred result
Blackburn-Mutton Labor	Charlie Mutton	15,630	65.3	
Liberal	Walter Perse	8,302	34.7	
Blackburn-Mutton Labor hold		Swing	N/A	

==== 1945 ====
1945 Victorian state election: Coburg
Party	Candidate	Votes	%	±%
Independent Labor	Charlie Mutton	10,986	52.1	
Labor	Arthur Lewis	5,213	24.7	
Liberal	Allen Bateman	4,899	23.2	
Total formal votes		21,098	98.4	
Informal votes		341	1.6	
Turnout		21,439	87.7	
Independent Labor hold		Swing		

- Preferences were not distributed.

==== 1943 ====
1943 Victorian state election: Coburg
Party	Candidate	Votes	%	±%
Independent	Charlie Mutton	13,996	50.8	+50.8
Labor	Jessie Satchell	5,806	21.1	−46.0
United Australia	Herbert Rusmussen	3,564	12.9	−20.0
Independent	Charles Hosken	2,801	10.2	+10.2
Independent	Donald McDonald	1,368	5.0	+5.0
Total formal votes		27,535	95.6	−3.0
Informal votes		1,272	4.4	+3.0
Turnout		28,807	87.5	−5.7
Independent gain from Labor		Swing	N/A	

- Preferences were not distributed.

==== 1940 by-election ====
1940 Coburg state by-election
Party	Candidate	Votes	%	±%
Labor	Roy Cameron	10,036	39.3	−27.8
Independent Labor	Charlie Mutton	8,172	32.0	+32.0
Independent	Herbert Rasmussen	7,339	28.7	+28.7
Total formal votes		26,254	96.7	−1.9
Informal votes		865	3.3	+1.9
Turnout		27,119	93.2	0.0
Two-candidate-preferred result
Independent Labor	Charlie Mutton	14,082	55.1	
Labor	Roy Cameron	11,465	44.9	
Independent Labor gain from Labor		Swing	N/A	

1940 Victorian state election: Coburg
Party	Candidate	Votes	%	±%
Labor	Frank Keane	17,927	67.1	+4.3
United Australia	Richard Griffiths	8,810	32.9	−4.3
Total formal votes		26,737	98.6	−0.4
Informal votes		382	1.4	+0.4
Turnout		27,119	93.2	−2.0
Labor hold		Swing	+4.3	

=== Elections in the 1930s ===
==== 1937 ====
1937 Victorian state election: Coburg
Party	Candidate	Votes	%	±%
Labor	Frank Keane	16,218	62.8	+1.6
United Australia	Henry Richards	9,613	37.2	−1.6
Total formal votes		25,831	99.0	+0.7
Informal votes		268	1.0	−0.7
Turnout		26,099	95.2	+1.2
Labor hold		Swing	+1.6	

==== 1935 ====
1935 Victorian state election: Coburg
Party	Candidate	Votes	%	±%
Labor	Frank Keane	14,633	61.2	+8.4
United Australia	Henry Stubbs	9,294	38.8	+3.4
Total formal votes		23,927	98.4	+0.9
Informal votes		384	1.6	−0.9
Turnout		24,311	94.0	−1.9
Labor hold		Swing	+4.9	

==== 1932 ====
1932 Victorian state election: Coburg
Party	Candidate	Votes	%	±%
Labor	Frank Keane	12,030	52.8	−47.2
United Australia	Alfred Carter	8,059	35.4	+35.4
Independent	Henry Richards	2,698	13.8	+13.8
Total formal votes		22,787	97.5	
Informal votes		586	2.5	
Turnout		23,373	95.9	
Two-party-preferred result
Labor	Frank Keane		56.3	−43.7
United Australia	Alfred Carter		43.7	+43.7
Labor hold		Swing	N/A	

- Two party preferred vote was estimated.

=== Elections in the 1920s ===
==== 1929 ====
1929 Victorian state election: Coburg
Party	Candidate	Votes	%	±%
Labor	Frank Keane	unopposed		
Labor hold		Swing		

==== 1927 ====
1927 Victorian state election: Coburg
Party	Candidate	Votes	%	±%
Labor	Frank Keane	13,005	67.5	
Nationalist	Henry Richards	6,256	32.5	
Total formal votes		19,261	99.1	
Informal votes		183	0.9	
Turnout		19,444	94.7	
Labor hold		Swing		
