= Results of the 1947 Victorian state election (Legislative Assembly) =

Australian state election results

Victorian state election, 8 November 1947 Legislative Assembly << 1945–1950 >>
Enrolled voters	1,291,515				
Votes cast	1,206,815		Turnout	93.44	+5.46
Informal votes	16,102		Informal	1.33	−0.75
Summary of votes by party
Party	Primary votes	%	Swing	Seats	Change
Labor	486,635	40.87	−0.15	17	−14
Liberal	442,451	37.16	+16.65	27	+17
Country	177,698	14.92	−4.05	20	+2
Communist	1,575	0.13	−2.73	0	±0
Independent	82,354	6.92	−3.57	1	−2
Total	1,190,713			65	

This is a list of electoral district results for the Victorian 1947 election.

== Results by electoral district ==
=== Albert Park ===
1947 Victorian state election: Albert Park
Party	Candidate	Votes	%	±%
Liberal	Roy Schilling	12,245	51.2	+33.6
Labor	Frank Crean	11,664	48.8	+13.9
Total formal votes		23,909	99.2	+3.1
Informal votes		199	0.8	−3.1
Turnout		24,108	89.6	+4.8
Liberal gain from Labor		Swing	N/A	

=== Allandale ===
1947 Victorian state election: Allandale
Party	Candidate	Votes	%	±%
Country	Russell White	5,911	41.3	+10.6
Labor	Thomas Powell	4,771	40.3	−8.2
Liberal	Hector Alcock	2,640	18.4	−2.4
Total formal votes		14,322	99.4	+0.3
Informal votes		79	0.6	−0.3
Turnout		14,401	95.4	+5.2
Two-party-preferred result
Country	Russell White	8,142	56.8	+6.5
Labor	Thomas Powell	6,180	43.2	−6.5
Country hold		Swing	+6.5	

=== Ballarat ===
1947 Victorian state election: Ballarat
Party	Candidate	Votes	%	±%
Liberal	Thomas Hollway	11,267	54.2	+1.6
Labor	James Miller	9,516	45.8	+4.0
Total formal votes		20,783	99.2	+0.7
Informal votes		157	0.8	−0.7
Turnout		20,940	95.5	+3.9
Liberal hold		Swing	N/A	

=== Barwon ===
1947 Victorian state election: Barwon
Party	Candidate	Votes	%	±%
Liberal	Thomas Maltby	9,449	65.7	+49.2
Labor	Don Ferguson	4,933	34.3	0.0
Total formal votes		14,382	98.9	+0.6
Informal votes		155	1.1	−0.1
Turnout		14,537	94.1	+2.5
Liberal gain from Independent Liberal		Swing	N/A	

=== Benalla ===
1947 Victorian state election: Benalla
Party	Candidate	Votes	%	±%
Country	Frederick Cook	8,141	67.3	+12.6
Liberal	Thomas Nolan	3,955	32.7	+32.7
Total formal votes		12,096	96.3	−1.2
Informal votes		467	3.7	+1.2
Turnout		12,563	93.0	+4.2
Country hold		Swing	N/A	

=== Benambra ===
1947 Victorian state election: Benambra
Party	Candidate	Votes	%	±%
Country	Tom Mitchell	unopposed		
Country hold		Swing	N/A	

=== Bendigo ===
1947 Victorian state election: Bendigo
Party	Candidate	Votes	%	±%
Labor	Bill Galvin	11,618	56.4	−43.6
Country	Norman Oliver	6,795	33.0	+33.0
Liberal	Eric Thomson	2,190	10.6	+10.6
Total formal votes		20,603	99.3	
Informal votes		140	0.7	
Turnout		20,743	95.2	
Labor hold		Swing	N/A	

- Preferences were not distributed.

=== Borung ===
1947 Victorian state election: Borung
Party	Candidate	Votes	%	±%
Country	Wilfred Mibus	8,225	64.5	+37.2
Independent Country	Finlay Cameron	4,521	35.5	+19.9
Total formal votes		12,746	99.1	+0.6
Informal votes		121	0.9	−0.6
Turnout		12,867	96.2	+5.9
Country hold		Swing	N/A	

=== Box Hill ===
1947 Victorian state election: Box Hill
Party	Candidate	Votes	%	±%
Liberal	George Reid	11,260	44.2	+6.5
Labor	Bob Gray	9,872	38.8	−12.2
Independent Liberal	Reginald Cooper	4,346	17.1	+17.1
Total formal votes		25,478	99.0	+0.5
Informal votes		267	1.0	−0.5
Turnout		25,745	93.7	+5.4
Two-party-preferred result
Liberal	George Reid	14,885	58.4	
Labor	Bob Gray	10,593	41.6	
Liberal gain from Labor		Swing	N/A	

=== Brighton ===
1947 Victorian state election: Brighton
Party	Candidate	Votes	%	±%
Liberal	Ray Tovell	16,464	65.2	+24.6
Independent	Ian Macfarlan	8,795	34.8	+34.8
Total formal votes		25,259	97.5	−1.2
Informal votes		659	2.5	+1.2
Turnout		25,918	93.2	+5.3
Liberal hold		Swing	N/A	

=== Brunswick ===
1947 Victorian state election: Brunswick
Party	Candidate	Votes	%	±%
Labor	James Jewell	16,253	66.6	−6.4
Liberal	Alfred Wall	8,137	33.4	+6.4
Total formal votes		24,390	98.5	−0.2
Informal votes		374	1.5	+0.2
Turnout		24,764	94.2	+6.8
Labor hold		Swing	−6.4	

=== Camberwell ===
1947 Victorian state election: Camberwell
Party	Candidate	Votes	%	±%
Liberal	Robert Whately	16,021	67.2	+26.6
Independent Liberal	Walter Fordham	7,803	32.8	+2.5
Total formal votes		23,824	96.5	−1.0
Informal votes		858	3.5	+1.0
Turnout		24,682	91.8	+3.7
Liberal hold		Swing	+13.7	

=== Carlton ===
1947 Victorian state election: Carlton
Party	Candidate	Votes	%	±%
Labor	Bill Barry	16,458	67.0	−9.2
Liberal	Stanley Lang	8,124	33.0	+33.0
Total formal votes		24,582	97.9	+5.0
Informal votes		532	2.1	−5.0
Turnout		25,114	91.9	+6.5
Labor hold		Swing	N/A	

=== Caulfield ===
1947 Victorian state election: Caulfield
Party	Candidate	Votes	%	±%
Liberal	Alexander Dennett	unopposed		
Liberal hold		Swing		

=== Clifton Hill ===
1947 Victorian state election: Clifton Hill
Party	Candidate	Votes	%	±%
Labor	Jack Cremean	15,798	63.7	+5.3
Liberal	Neil McKay	9,002	36.3	+8.4
Total formal votes		24,800	98.8	+1.5
Informal votes		312	1.2	−1.5
Turnout		25,112	93.2	+4.9
Labor hold		Swing	N/A	

=== Coburg ===
1947 Victorian state election: Coburg
Party	Candidate	Votes	%	±%
Blackburn-Mutton Labor	Charlie Mutton	9,223	38.5	−13.6
Liberal	Walter Perse	7,859	32.8	+9.6
Labor	George Henderson	6,850	28.6	+5.4
Total formal votes		23,932	98.7	+0.3
Informal votes		325	1.3	−0.3
Turnout		24,257	94.7	+7.0
Two-candidate-preferred result
Blackburn-Mutton Labor	Charlie Mutton	15,630	65.3	
Liberal	Walter Perse	8,302	34.7	
Blackburn-Mutton Labor hold		Swing	N/A	

=== Collingwood ===
1947 Victorian state election: Collingwood
Party	Candidate	Votes	%	±%
Labor	Bill Towers	17,690	73.4	−26.6
Liberal	William Boughton	6,420	26.6	+26.6
Total formal votes		24,110	97.4	
Informal votes		653	2.6	
Turnout		24,763	91.5	
Labor hold		Swing	N/A	

=== Dandenong ===
1947 Victorian state election: Dandenong
Party	Candidate	Votes	%	±%
Liberal	William Dawnay-Mould	12,149	47.4	+13.6
Labor	Frank Field	11,265	43.9	−8.1
Country	Alexander Caldwell	2,231	8.7	+8.7
Total formal votes		25,645	98.6	+1.7
Informal votes		375	1.4	−1.7
Turnout		26,020	94.1	+5.1
Two-party-preferred result
Liberal	William Dawnay-Mould	14,142	55.1	
Labor	Frank Field	11,503	44.9	
Liberal gain from Labor		Swing	N/A	

=== Dundas ===
1947 Victorian state election: Dundas
Party	Candidate	Votes	%	±%
Liberal	William McDonald	7,812	55.4	+20.5
Labor	Bill Slater	6,287	44.6	−20.5
Total formal votes		14,099	99.6	+0.8
Informal votes		53	0.4	−0.8
Turnout		14,152	96.1	+5.7
Liberal gain from Labor		Swing	+20.5	

=== Elsternwick ===
1947 Victorian state election: Elsternwick
Party	Candidate	Votes	%	±%
Liberal	John Don	14,256	64.2	+14.3
Labor	Gregory Gowans	7,955	35.8	+35.8
Total formal votes		22,211	99.3	+1.5
Informal votes		159	0.7	−1.5
Turnout		22,370	91.8	+3.8
Liberal hold		Swing	N/A	

=== Essendon ===
1947 Victorian state election: Essendon
Party	Candidate	Votes	%	±%
Liberal	Allen Bateman	12,776	50.6	+14.0
Labor	Arthur Drakeford	12,464	49.4	−14.0
Total formal votes		25,240	98.9	+0.9
Informal votes		288	1.1	−0.9
Turnout		25,528	94.8	+5.1
Liberal gain from Labor		Swing	+14.0	

=== Evelyn ===
1947 Victorian state election: Evelyn
Party	Candidate	Votes	%	±%
Liberal	William Everard	8,656	60.9	+31.5
Labor	Roderick Leeson	5,074	35.7	−3.6
Independent Country	Patrick McKie	474	3.3	+3.3
Total formal votes		14,204	98.5	0.0
Informal votes		213	1.5	0.0
Turnout		14,417	93.3	+5.7
Liberal hold		Swing	N/A	

- Preferences were not distributed.

=== Footscray ===
1947 Victorian state election: Footscray
Party	Candidate	Votes	%	±%
Labor	Jack Holland	17,370	71.9	−28.1
Liberal	William Massey	6,782	28.1	+28.1
Total formal votes		24,152	98.8	
Informal votes		286	1.2	
Turnout		24,438	92.9	
Labor hold		Swing	N/A	

=== Geelong ===
1947 Victorian state election: Geelong
Party	Candidate	Votes	%	±%
Labor	Fanny Brownbill	11,852	57.9	−42.1
Liberal	Edward Montgomery	8,623	42.1	+42.1
Total formal votes		20,475	99.3	
Informal votes		152	0.7	
Turnout		20,627	94.4	
Labor hold		Swing	N/A	

=== Gippsland East ===
1947 Victorian state election: Gippsland East
Party	Candidate	Votes	%	±%
Country	Albert Lind	8,376	71.5	+6.3
Labor	Thomas Parkinson	3,333	28.5	−6.3
Total formal votes		11,789	99.3	+0.1
Informal votes		77	0.7	−0.1
Turnout		11,786	93.6	+5.9
Country hold		Swing	+6.3	

=== Gippsland North ===
1947 Victorian state election: Gippsland North
Party	Candidate	Votes	%	±%
Country	Bill Fulton	6,880	52.2	+28.6
Labor	James Johns	6,304	47.8	−2.5
Total formal votes		13,184	99.3	+0.8
Informal votes		97	0.7	−0.8
Turnout		13,281	94.2	
Country gain from Labor		Swing	N/A	

=== Gippsland South ===
1947 Victorian state election: Gippsland South
Party	Candidate	Votes	%	±%
Country	Herbert Hyland	9,648	69.2	+6.2
Labor	Percy Vagg	4,294	30.8	−6.2
Total formal votes		13,942	99.2	0.0
Informal votes		105	0.8	0.0
Turnout		14,047	95.1	+5.4
Country hold		Swing	+6.2	

=== Gippsland West ===
1947 Victorian state election: Gippsland West
Party	Candidate	Votes	%	±%
Country	Matthew Bennett	6,636	46.5	−7.4
Liberal	Basil Morris	4,047	28.3	+28.3
Labor	Fred Rush	3,599	25.2	−7.3
Total formal votes		14,282	99.2	+0.7
Informal votes		121	0.8	−0.7
Turnout		14,403	93.2	+5.4
Two-candidate-preferred result
Country	Matthew Bennett	8,118	56.8	
Liberal	Basil Morris	6,164	43.2	
Country hold		Swing	N/A	

=== Glen Iris ===
1947 Victorian state election: Glen Iris
Party	Candidate	Votes	%	±%
Liberal	Les Norman	14,190	61.2	+20.6
Independent	Ian McLaren	8,991	38.8	+8.4
Total formal votes		23,181	99.1	+0.5
Informal votes		211	0.9	−0.5
Turnout		23,392	93.5	+5.6
Liberal gain from Independent		Swing	+18.2	

=== Goulburn ===
1947 Victorian state election: Goulburn
Party	Candidate	Votes	%	±%
Labor	Joseph Smith	5,632	45.1	−0.4
Liberal	Philip Grimwade	3,811	30.5	+8.8
Country	Cyril Davy	3,045	24.4	+8.4
Total formal votes		12,488	99.2	+0.3
Informal votes		101	0.8	−0.3
Turnout		12,589	93.9	+6.7
Two-party-preferred result
Liberal	Philip Grimwade	6,655	53.3	+5.2
Labor	Joseph Smith	5,833	46.7	−5.2
Liberal gain from Labor		Swing	+5.2	

=== Grant ===
1947 Victorian state election: Grant
Party	Candidate	Votes	%	±%
Labor	Horace Hughes	5,637	40.4	−1.4
Country	Frederick Holden	4,573	32.7	−9.3
Liberal	Tom Austin	3,756	26.9	+10.7
Total formal votes		13,966	98.9	+0.2
Informal votes		157	1.1	−0.2
Turnout		14,123	93.4	+6.9
Two-party-preferred result
Country	Frederick Holden	8,105	58.0	+1.4
Labor	Horace Hughes	5,861	42.0	−1.4
Country hold		Swing	+1.4	

=== Hampden ===
1947 Victorian state election: Hampden
Party	Candidate	Votes	%	±%
Liberal	Henry Bolte	6,796	49.9	+31.2
Labor	Raymond Hyatt	5,700	41.9	−2.1
Independent Country	Alfred Matthey	1,114	8.2	+8.2
Total formal votes		13,610	99.3	+1.3
Informal votes		93	0.7	−1.3
Turnout		13,703	95.0	+5.3
Two-party-preferred result
Liberal	Henry Bolte	7,722	56.7	+9.1
Labor	Raymond Hyatt	5,888	43.3	−9.1
Liberal gain from Labor		Swing	+9.1	

=== Hawthorn ===
1947 Victorian state election: Hawthorn
Party	Candidate	Votes	%	±%
Liberal	Fred Edmunds	12,296	51.8	+19.1
Labor	Charles Murphy	8,337	35.2	−0.2
Independent	Leslie Hollins	3,088	13.0	−18.9
Total formal votes		23,721	98.8	+0.8
Informal votes		293	1.2	−0.8
Turnout		24,014	93.2	+5.6
Liberal hold		Swing	N/A	

- Preferences were not distributed.

=== Ivanhoe ===
1947 Victorian state election: Ivanhoe
Party	Candidate	Votes	%	±%
Liberal	Rupert Curnow	14,971	61.7	+12.7
Independent	Robert Gardner	8,613	35.5	−15.5
Independent Liberal	Leighton Weber	677	2.8	+2.8
Total formal votes		24,261	98.8	+0.9
Informal votes		283	1.2	−0.9
Turnout		24,544	93.1	+6.1
Liberal gain from Independent		Swing	N/A	

- Preferences were not distributed.

=== Kew ===
1947 Victorian state election: Kew
Party	Candidate	Votes	%	±%
Liberal	Wilfrid Kent Hughes	16,528	71.2	−28.8
Labor	Rupert Purchase	6,694	28.8	+28.8
Total formal votes		23,222	99.1	
Informal votes		204	0.9	
Turnout		23,426	90.0	
Liberal hold		Swing	N/A	

=== Korong ===
1947 Victorian state election: Korong
Party	Candidate	Votes	%	±%
Country	Albert Dunstan	8,715	71.1	+3.3
Labor	Ernest Duus	3,547	28.9	−3.3
Total formal votes		12,262	99.4	+0.2
Informal votes		70	0.6	−0.2
Turnout		12,332	94.9	+6.4
Country hold		Swing	+3.3	

=== Malvern ===
1947 Victorian state election: Malvern
Party	Candidate	Votes	%	±%
Liberal	Trevor Oldham	13,001	63.0	−37.0
Independent Liberal	Andrew Sinclair	4,703	22.8	+22.8
Independent	Mascotte Brown	2,984	14.2	+14.2
Total formal votes		20,648	95.3	
Informal votes		1,025	4.7	
Turnout		21,673	90.3	
Liberal hold		Swing	N/A	

- Preferences were not distributed.

=== Melbourne ===
1947 Victorian state election: Melbourne
Party	Candidate	Votes	%	±%
Labor	Tom Hayes	13,642	59.8	−40.2
Liberal	George Crowther	9,189	40.2	+40.2
Total formal votes		22,831	97.2	
Informal votes		647	2.8	
Turnout		23,478	88.7	
Labor hold		Swing	N/A	

=== Mentone ===
1947 Victorian state election: Mentone
Party	Candidate	Votes	%	±%
Liberal	Harry Drew	13,940	52.6	+16.9
Labor	George White	12,549	47.4	−2.5
Total formal votes		26,489	99.3	+0.9
Informal votes		192	0.7	−0.9
Turnout		26,681	94.1	+5.3
Liberal gain from Labor		Swing	+6.5	

=== Mernda ===
1947 Victorian state election: Mernda
Party	Candidate	Votes	%	±%
Liberal	Arthur Ireland	5,042	39.2	+6.4
Independent Labor	Jack Gill	4,280	31.6	+31.6
Country	Leslie Webster	4,223	31.2	−2.9
Total formal votes		13,545	98.6	+0.4
Informal votes		186	1.4	−0.4
Turnout		13,731	92.5	+5.2
Two-candidate-preferred result
Liberal	Arthur Ireland	8,857	65.4	+65.4
Independent Labor	Jack Gill	4,688	34.6	+34.6
Liberal gain from Country		Swing	N/A	

=== Midlands ===
1947 Victorian state election: Midlands
Party	Candidate	Votes	%	±%
Labor	Clive Stoneham	7,040	50.2	−9.4
Country	Thomas Grigg	6,979	49.8	+9.4
Total formal votes		14,019	99.4	+0.1
Informal votes		91	0.6	−0.1
Turnout		14,110	95.9	+5.0
Labor hold		Swing	−9.4	

=== Mildura ===
1947 Victorian state election: Mildura
Party	Candidate	Votes	%	±%
Country	Nathaniel Barclay	6,947	52.0	+23.4
Labor	Louis Garlick	6,421	48.0	+4.3
Total formal votes		13,368	99.2	+1.6
Informal votes		103	0.8	−1.6
Turnout		13,471	93.6	+7.6
Country gain from Labor		Swing	+3.2	

=== Moonee Ponds ===
1947 Victorian state election: Moonee Ponds
Party	Candidate	Votes	%	±%
Labor	Samuel Merrifield	13,982	54.8	−45.2
Liberal	Wallace Crichton	11,534	45.2	+45.2
Total formal votes		25,516	99.1	
Informal votes		229	0.9	
Turnout		25,745	94.9	
Labor hold		Swing	N/A	

=== Mornington ===
1947 Victorian state election: Mornington
Party	Candidate	Votes	%	±%
Liberal	William Leggatt	7,854	52.9	+7.4
Labor	Bertram Maslen	4,292	28.9	+28.9
Country	Eric Rundle	2,692	18.1	−36.4
Total formal votes		14,838	99.0	+1.9
Informal votes		144	1.0	−1.9
Liberal gain from Country		Swing	N/A	

- Preferences were not distributed.

=== Murray Valley ===
1947 Victorian state election: Murray Valley
Party	Candidate	Votes	%	±%
Country	George Moss	8,003	61.0	+24.1
Labor	Neil Stewart	5,117	39.0	−1.9
Total formal votes		13,120	99.2	+0.4
Informal votes		104	0.8	−0.4
Turnout		13,224	93.0	+7.5
Country hold		Swing	+6.3	

=== Northcote ===
1947 Victorian state election: Northcote
Party	Candidate	Votes	%	±%
Labor	John Cain	15,618	63.8	−36.2
Liberal	Jack McColl	8,853	36.2	+36.2
Total formal votes		24,471	99.0	
Informal votes		248	1.0	
Turnout		24,719	95.5	
Labor hold		Swing	N/A	

=== Oakleigh ===
1947 Victorian state election: Oakleigh
Party	Candidate	Votes	%	±%
Liberal	John Lechte	12,630	51.1	+14.3
Labor	Squire Reid	12,085	48.9	−14.3
Total formal votes		24,715	99.3	+0.4
Informal votes		180	0.7	−0.4
Turnout		24,895	94.9	+5.3
Liberal gain from Labor		Swing	+14.3	

=== Polwarth ===
1947 Victorian state election: Polwarth
Party	Candidate	Votes	%	±%
Country	Edward Guye	9,028	66.9	+4.3
Labor	Edwin Morris	4,462	33.1	−4.3
Total formal votes		13,490	99.4	+0.3
Informal votes		79	0.6	−0.3
Turnout		13,569	95.1	+5.7
Country hold		Swing	+4.3	

=== Portland ===
1947 Victorian state election: Portland
Party	Candidate	Votes	%	±%
Labor	Robert Holt	6,576	47.5	−7.0
Country	Harry Hedditch	4,100	29.6	−15.9
Liberal	James Lindsey	3,161	22.8	+22.8
Total formal votes		13,837	99.2	−0.3
Informal votes		115	0.8	+0.3
Turnout		13,952	95.8	+5.0
Two-party-preferred result
Country	Harry Hedditch	6,994	50.5	+5.0
Labor	Robert Holt	6,843	49.5	−5.0
Country gain from Labor		Swing	+5.0	

=== Port Melbourne ===
1947 Victorian state election: Port Melbourne
Party	Candidate	Votes	%	±%
Labor	Tom Corrigan	17,446	68.9	−7.5
Liberal	Stanley Evans	6,315	24.9	+24.9
Communist	Ralph Gibson	1,575	6.2	−17.4
Total formal votes		25,336	97.6	+2.3
Informal votes		622	2.4	−2.3
Turnout		25,958	93.0	+6.9
Labor hold		Swing	N/A	

- Preferences were not distributed.

=== Prahran ===
1947 Victorian state election: Prahran
Party	Candidate	Votes	%	±%
Labor	Bill Quirk	12,329	50.2	−3.2
Liberal	Martin Smith	12,238	49.8	+9.7
Total formal votes		24,567	98.9	+1.1
Informal votes		280	1.1	−1.1
Turnout		24,847	90.8	+5.2
Labor hold		Swing	N/A	

=== Preston ===
1947 Victorian state election: Preston
Party	Candidate	Votes	%	±%
Labor	William Ruthven	14,221	57.0	+9.7
Liberal	Frederick Lee	10,727	43.0	+43.0
Total formal votes		24,948	99.3	+0.8
Informal votes		174	0.7	−0.8
Turnout		25,122	95.6	+4.1
Labor hold		Swing	N/A	

=== Rainbow ===
1947 Victorian state election: Rainbow
Party	Candidate	Votes	%	±%
Country	Keith Dodgshun	9,256	77.9	+14.0
Labor	Raymond Peake	2,621	22.1	−14.0
Total formal votes		11,877	99.5	+0.1
Informal votes		59	0.5	−0.1
Turnout		11,936	95.3	+6.1
Country hold		Swing	+14.0	

=== Richmond ===
1947 Victorian state election: Richmond
Party	Candidate	Votes	%	±%
Labor	Stan Keon	18,233	73.0	−2.9
Liberal	Roland Leckie	6,736	27.0	+27.0
Total formal votes		24,969	98.2	+4.2
Informal votes		465	1.8	−4.2
Turnout		25,434	94.1	+7.5
Labor hold		Swing	N/A	

=== Ripon ===
1947 Victorian state election: Ripon
Party	Candidate	Votes	%	±%
Labor	Ernie Morton	6,338	46.1	−5.5
Liberal	Rutherford Guthrie	4,103	29.8	+29.8
Country	Leonard Rodda	3,319	24.1	−24.3
Total formal votes		13,760	99.5	+0.1
Informal votes		73	0.5	−0.1
Turnout		13,833	96.3	+6.3
Two-party-preferred result
Liberal	Rutherford Guthrie	7,185	52.2	+52.2
Labor	Ernie Morton	6,575	47.8	−3.8
Liberal gain from Labor		Swing	N/A	

=== Rodney ===
1947 Victorian state election: Rodney
Party	Candidate	Votes	%	±%
Country	Richard Brose	9,269	70.8	+32.5
Liberal	Morton Garner	3,838	29.2	+29.2
Total formal votes		13,087	95.4	−3.4
Informal votes		628	4.6	+3.4
Turnout		13,087	95.3	+5.3
Country hold		Swing	N/A	

=== Scoresby ===
1947 Victorian state election: Scoresby
Party	Candidate	Votes	%	±%
Liberal	George Knox	unopposed		
Liberal hold		Swing		

=== Shepparton ===
1947 Victorian state election: Shepparton
Party	Candidate	Votes	%	±%
Country	John McDonald	9,861	68.5	+5.5
Labor	Edward Newman	4,525	31.5	−5.5
Total formal votes		14,386	99.0	−0.3
Informal votes		143	1.0	+0.3
Turnout		14,529	94.1	+6.2
Country hold		Swing	+5.5	

=== St Kilda ===
1947 Victorian state election: St Kilda
Party	Candidate	Votes	%	±%
Independent Liberal	Archie Michaelis	13,527	58.1	+28.2
Labor	Bill Bourke	9,748	41.9	−2.9
Total formal votes		23,275	98.8	+1.3
Informal votes		277	1.2	−1.3
Turnout		23,552	91.2	+5.2
Independent Liberal hold		Swing	+7.6	

=== Sunshine ===
1947 Victorian state election: Sunshine
Party	Candidate	Votes	%	±%
Labor	Ernie Shepherd	16,474	69.0	−31.0
Liberal	Lindsay Smith	7,416	31.0	+31.0
Total formal votes		23,890	99.0	
Informal votes		238	1.0	
Turnout		24,128	94.3	
Labor hold		Swing	N/A	

=== Swan Hill ===
1947 Victorian state election: Swan Hill
Party	Candidate	Votes	%	±%
Country	John Hipworth	8,324	64.9	+25.4
Labor	Philip Meehan	3,360	26.2	−4.3
Independent Country	Stanley Taylor	1,145	8.9	+8.9
Total formal votes		12,829	99.3	+1.1
Informal votes		90	0.7	−1.1
Turnout		12,919	94.4	+7.6
Country hold		Swing	N/A	

- Preferences were not distributed.

=== Toorak ===
1947 Victorian state election: Toorak
Party	Candidate	Votes	%	±%
Liberal	Robert Hamilton	13,178	59.0	+37.5
Independent	Peter Ryan	6,613	29.6	+29.6
Independent Liberal	Edgar Morton	2,542	11.4	+11.4
Total formal votes		22,333	97.1	+3.3
Informal votes		666	2.9	−3.3
Turnout		22,999	87.9	+5.3
Liberal hold		Swing	N/A	

- Preferences were not distributed.

=== Warrnambool ===
1947 Victorian state election: Warrnambool
Party	Candidate	Votes	%	±%
Country	Henry Bailey	8,204	59.4	+7.8
Labor	Fred Reid	5,607	40.6	−7.8
Total formal votes		13,811	99.4	+0.6
Informal votes		80	0.6	−0.6
Turnout		13,891	96.0	+6.1
Country hold		Swing	+7.8	

=== Williamstown ===
1947 Victorian state election: Williamstown
Party	Candidate	Votes	%	±%
Labor	John Lemmon	15,901	63.4	+12.3
Liberal	Clifford Rankine	6,697	26.7	+5.1
Independent Labor	George Paine	2,492	9.9	+9.9
Total formal votes		25,090	99.0	+0.7
Informal votes		264	1.0	−0.7
Turnout		25,354	95.0	+5.1
Labor hold		Swing	N/A	

- Preferences were not distributed.

=== Wonthaggi ===
1947 Victorian state election: Wonthaggi
Party	Candidate	Votes	%	±%
Country	William Buckingham	8,317	57.0	+14.3
Labor	William McKenzie	5,281	43.0	−14.3
Total formal votes		14,598	99.6	+0.4
Informal votes		64	0.4	−0.4
Turnout		14,662	95.3	+5.4
Country gain from Labor		Swing	+14.3	

== See also ==
- 1947 Victorian state election
- Members of the Victorian Legislative Assembly, 1947–1950
