= Electoral results for the district of Brunswick =

This is a list of electoral results for the electoral district of Brunswick in Victorian state elections.

== Members for Brunswick ==
First incarnation (1904–1955)
Member	Party	Term
Frank Anstey	Labor	1904–1910
James Jewell	Labor	1910–1949
Peter Randles	Labor	1949–1955
Peter Randles	Anti-Communist ALP	1949–1955
Second incarnation (1976–1992)
Member	Party	Term
Tom Roper	Labor	1976–1992
Third incarnation (2002–present)
Member	Party	Term
Carlo Carli	Labor	2002–2010
Jane Garrett	Labor	2010–2018
Tim Read	Greens	2018–present

== Election results ==
=== Elections in the 2020s ===
==== 2022 ====
2022 Victorian state election: Brunswick
Party	Candidate	Votes	%	±%
Greens	Tim Read	18,959	43.6	+1.2
Labor	Mike Williams	12,392	28.5	−9.4
Liberal	Minh Quan Nguyen	4,723	10.9	+2.6
Victorian Socialists	Nahui Jimenez	3,506	8.1	+8.1
Reason	Shea Evans	1,933	4.4	−0.3
Animal Justice	Rachel Lamarche-Beauchesne	699	1.6	−0.5
Independent	Anthony Helou	551	1.3	+1.3
Family First	Lilian Sabry Shaker	529	1.2	+1.2
Independent	Kenneth Charles Taylor	153	0.4	+0.4
Total formal votes		43,445	96.2	+2.0
Informal votes		1,733	3.8	−2.0
Turnout		45,178	86.4	−0.9
Notional two-party-preferred count
Labor	Mike Williams	36,518	84.1	−0.5
Liberal	Minh Quan Nguyen	6,927	15.9	+0.5
Two-candidate-preferred result
Greens	Tim Read	27,664	63.7	+11.7
Labor	Mike Williams	15,781	36.3	−11.7
Greens hold		Swing	+11.7	

=== Elections in the 2010s ===
==== 2018 ====
2018 Victorian state election: Brunswick
Party	Candidate	Votes	%	±%
Greens	Tim Read	17,599	40.06	+0.42
Labor	Cindy O'Connor	16,701	38.02	+0.06
Liberal	Adam Wojtonis	4,450	10.13	−6.11
Reason	Catherine Deveny	1,969	4.48	+4.48
Independent	George Georgiou	1,240	2.82	+2.82
Animal Justice	Christopher Miles	829	1.89	+0.12
Liberal Democrats	Noel Collins	613	1.40	+1.40
Independent	Kerry Sourasis	276	0.63	+0.63
Independent	Christopher Anderson	250	0.57	+0.57
Total formal votes		43,927	93.75	−1.33
Informal votes		2,927	6.25	+1.33
Turnout		46,854	87.84	−2.56
Two-party-preferred result
Labor	Cindy O'Connor	37,066	84.38	+4.98
Liberal	Adam Wojtonis	6,861	15.62	−4.98
Two-candidate-preferred result
Greens	Tim Read	22,215	50.57	+2.53
Labor	Cindy O'Connor	21,712	49.43	−2.53
Greens gain from Labor		Swing	+2.53	

==== 2014 ====
2014 Victorian state election: Brunswick
Party	Candidate	Votes	%	±%
Greens	Tim Read	16,001	39.6	+9.5
Labor	Jane Garrett	15,318	38.0	+1.9
Liberal	Giuseppe Vellotti	6,554	16.2	−0.9
Animal Justice	Ward Young	714	1.8	+1.8
People Power Victoria	Stella Kariofyllidis	670	1.7	+1.7
Save The Planet	Dean O'Callaghan	491	1.2	+1.2
Family First	Frank Giurleo	396	1.0	+1.0
Christians	Babar Peters	214	0.5	+0.5
Total formal votes		40,358	95.1	+0.3
Informal votes		2,089	4.9	−0.3
Turnout		42,447	90.4	+2.7
Notional two-party-preferred count
Labor	Jane Garrett	32,042	79.4	+4.3
Liberal	Giuseppe Vellotti	8,315	20.6	−4.3
Two-candidate-preferred result
Labor	Jane Garrett	21,075	52.2	−1.4
Greens	Tim Read	19,283	47.8	+1.4
Labor hold		Swing	−1.4	

==== 2010 ====
2010 Victorian state election: Brunswick
Party	Candidate	Votes	%	±%
Labor	Jane Garrett	13,129	36.02	−11.74
Greens	Cyndi Dawes	11,023	30.24	+0.53
Liberal	Kyle Dadleh	6,209	17.04	−0.38
Independent	Phil Cleary	3,914	10.74	+10.74
Sex Party	Amy Mulcahy	1,418	3.89	+3.89
Socialist Alliance	Trent Hawkins	405	1.11	−0.93
Independent	Bill Cawte	348	0.95	+0.95
Total formal votes		36,446	94.75	+0.91
Informal votes		2,018	5.25	−0.91
Turnout		38,464	90.89	+1.61
Notional two-party-preferred count
Labor	Jane Garrett	27,404	75.2	−2.7
Liberal	Kyle Dadleh	9,042	24.8	+2.7
Two-candidate-preferred result
Labor	Jane Garrett	19,545	53.52	−0.13
Greens	Cyndi Dawes	16,974	46.48	+0.13
Labor hold		Swing	−0.13	

=== Elections in the 2000s ===
==== 2006 ====
2006 Victorian state election: Brunswick
Party	Candidate	Votes	%	±%
Labor	Carlo Carli	15,891	47.74	−4.38
Greens	Cyndi Dawes	9,890	29.71	+5.37
Liberal	Vince Arborea	5,800	17.42	+1.01
Socialist Alliance	Vanessa Hearman	645	1.94	+0.19
Family First	James McDonald	557	1.67	+1.67
People Power	Christian Astourian	505	1.52	+1.52
Total formal votes		33,288	93.84	−0.66
Informal votes		2,186	6.16	+0.66
Turnout		35,474	89.28	−2.01
Notional two-party-preferred count
Labor	Carlo Carli	25,915	77.9	−0.2
Liberal	Vince Arborea	7,372	22.1	+0.2
Two-candidate-preferred result
Labor	Carlo Carli	17,940	53.65	−5.65
Greens	Cyndi Dawes	15,498	46.35	+5.65
Labor hold		Swing	−5.65	

==== 2002 ====
2002 Victorian state election: Brunswick
Party	Candidate	Votes	%	±%
Labor	Carlo Carli	17,075	52.1	−11.6
Greens	Pamela Curr	7,972	24.3	+18.4
Liberal	Rebecca Gauci	5,375	16.4	−10.5
Independent	Tony Morton	857	2.6	+2.6
Independent	Ken Taylor	752	2.3	+2.3
Socialist Alliance	Judy McVey	573	1.7	+1.7
Citizens Electoral Council	Steven Bird	154	0.5	+0.5
Total formal votes		32,758	94.5	−1.4
Informal votes		1,906	5.5	+1.4
Turnout		34,664	91.3	
Notional two-party-preferred count
Labor	Carlo Carli	25,554	78.0	+6.8
Liberal	Rebecca Gauci	7,192	22.0	−6.8
Two-candidate-preferred result
Labor	Carlo Carli	19,340	59.3	−11.9
Greens	Pamela Curr	13,281	40.7	+40.7
Labor hold		Swing	−11.9	

=== Elections in the 1980s ===
==== 1988 ====
1988 Victorian state election: Brunswick
Party	Candidate	Votes	%	±%
Labor	Tom Roper	15,521	63.95	−6.93
Liberal	Louise Joyce	6,885	28.37	−1.05
Democratic Labor	Michael Rowe	1,863	7.68	+7.68
Total formal votes		24,269	92.88	−2.05
Informal votes		1,861	7.12	+2.05
Turnout		26,130	87.58	−2.24
Two-party-preferred result
Labor	Tom Roper	16,172	66.67	−3.91
Liberal	Louise Joyce	8,083	33.33	+3.91
Labor hold		Swing	−3.91	

==== 1985 ====
1985 Victorian state election: Brunswick
Party	Candidate	Votes	%	±%
Labor	Tom Roper	18,371	70.6	−1.1
Liberal	Gregory Dinncen	7,657	29.4	+8.9
Total formal votes		26,028	94.9	
Informal votes		1,389	5.1	
Turnout		27,417	89.8	
Labor hold		Swing	−6.7	

==== 1982 ====
1982 Victorian state election: Brunswick
Party	Candidate	Votes	%	±%
Labor	Tom Roper	19,092	75.7	+5.5
Liberal	Brian Tuohy	4,673	18.5	−4.9
Australia	David Anderson	1,014	4.0	+4.0
Independent	James Ferrari	430	1.7	+1.7
Total formal votes		25,209	95.7	+0.1
Informal votes		1,135	4.3	−0.1
Turnout		26,344	90.7	+0.9
Two-party-preferred result
Labor	Tom Roper	19,890	78.9	+3.4
Liberal	Brian Tuohy	5,319	21.1	−3.4
Labor hold		Swing	+3.4	

=== Elections in the 1970s ===
==== 1979 ====
1979 Victorian state election: Brunswick
Party	Candidate	Votes	%	±%
Labor	Tom Roper	17,268	70.2	+7.7
Liberal	Geoff Leigh	5,762	23.4	−4.6
Communist	Philip Herington	1,580	6.4	+6.4
Total formal votes		24,610	95.6	+1.3
Informal votes		1,128	4.4	−1.3
Turnout		25,738	89.8	−0.7
Two-party-preferred result
Labor	Tom Roper	18,570	75.5	+10.8
Liberal	Geoff Leigh	6,040	24.5	−10.8
Labor hold		Swing	+10.8	

==== 1976 ====
1976 Victorian state election: Brunswick
Party	Candidate	Votes	%	±%
Labor	Tom Roper	15,731	62.5	+4.2
Liberal	Alfredos Kouris	7,037	28.0	+0.3
Independent	Stephen Cope	744	3.0	+3.0
Independent	Marian Kermonde	314	1.3	+1.3
Independent	Grahame Kermonde	287	1.1	+1.1
Independent	Robert Douglas	282	1.1	+1.1
Independent	Leslie Johns	248	1.0	+1.0
Independent	Angelo Russo	238	1.0	+1.0
Independent	Anthony Errichiello	208	0.8	+0.8
Independent	Ronald Moran	65	0.3	+0.3
Total formal votes		25,154	94.3	
Informal votes		1,524	5.7	
Turnout		26,678	90.5	
Two-party-preferred result
Labor	Tom Roper	16,286	64.7	+2.7
Liberal	Alfredos Kouris	8,868	35.3	−2.7
Labor hold		Swing	+2.7	

=== Elections in the 1950s ===
==== 1952 ====
1952 Victorian state election: Brunswick
Party	Candidate	Votes	%	±%
Labor	Peter Randles	unopposed		
Labor hold		Swing		

==== 1950 ====
1950 Victorian state election: Brunswick
Party	Candidate	Votes	%	±%
Labor	Peter Randles	16,626	71.0	+4.4
Liberal and Country	Bruce Cann	6,805	29.0	−4.4
Total formal votes		23,431	98.6	+0.1
Informal votes		342	1.4	−0.1
Turnout		23,773	94.8	+0.6
Labor hold		Swing	+4.4	

=== Elections in the 1940s ===
==== 1949 by-election ====
1949 Brunswick state by-election
Party	Candidate	Votes	%	±%
Labor	Peter Randles	12,332	56.1	−10.5
Liberal and Country	John Rossiter	5,297	24.1	−9.3
Blackburn-Mutton Labor	Daniel Healy	4,354	19.8	+19.8
Total formal votes		21,983	97.5	−1.0
Informal votes		568	2.5	+1.0
Turnout		22,551	89.4	−4.8
Labor hold		Swing	N/A	

- Preferences were not distributed.

==== 1947 ====
1947 Victorian state election: Brunswick
Party	Candidate	Votes	%	±%
Labor	James Jewell	16,253	66.6	−6.4
Liberal	Alfred Wall	8,137	33.4	+6.4
Total formal votes		24,390	98.5	−0.2
Informal votes		374	1.5	+0.2
Turnout		24,764	94.2	+6.8
Labor hold		Swing	−6.4	

==== 1945 ====
1945 Victorian state election: Brunswick
Party	Candidate	Votes	%	±%
Labor	James Jewell	16,211	73.0	
Liberal	Alfred Wall	5,991	27.0	
Total formal votes		22,202	98.7	
Informal votes		300	1.3	
Turnout		22,502	87.4	
Labor hold		Swing		

==== 1943 ====
1943 Victorian state election: Brunswick
Party	Candidate	Votes	%	±%
Labor	James Jewell	unopposed		
Labor hold		Swing		

==== 1940 ====
1940 Victorian state election: Brunswick
Party	Candidate	Votes	%	±%
Labor	James Jewell	unopposed		
Labor hold		Swing		

=== Elections in the 1930s ===
==== 1937 ====
1937 Victorian state election: Brunswick
Party	Candidate	Votes	%	±%
Labor	James Jewell	18,144	74.0	−26.0
United Australia	Charles Hartley	6,384	26.0	+26.0
Total formal votes		24,528	98.6	
Informal votes		355	1.4	
Turnout		24,883	94.1	
Labor hold		Swing	N/A	

==== 1935 ====
1935 Victorian state election: Brunswick
Party	Candidate	Votes	%	±%
Labor	James Jewell	unopposed		
Labor hold		Swing		

==== 1932 ====
1932 Victorian state election: Brunswick
Party	Candidate	Votes	%	±%
Labor	James Jewell	14,410	62.0	−38.0
United Australia	Henry Jones	8,828	38.0	+38.0
Total formal votes		23,238	98.5	
Informal votes		359	1.5	
Turnout		23,597	95.6	
Labor hold		Swing	N/A	

=== Elections in the 1920s ===
==== 1929 ====
1929 Victorian state election: Brunswick
Party	Candidate	Votes	%	±%
Labor	James Jewell	unopposed		
Labor hold		Swing		

==== 1927 ====
1927 Victorian state election: Brunswick
Party	Candidate	Votes	%	±%
Labor	James Jewell	16,204	76.1	
Nationalist	Leonard Smith	5,102	23.9	
Total formal votes		21,306	98.3	
Informal votes		363	1.7	
Turnout		21,669	94.2	
Labor hold		Swing		

==== 1924 ====
1924 Victorian state election: Brunswick
Party	Candidate	Votes	%	±%
Labor	James Jewell	unopposed		
Labor hold		Swing		

==== 1921 ====
1921 Victorian state election: Brunswick
Party	Candidate	Votes	%	±%
Labor	James Jewell	7,369	64.2	+0.9
Nationalist	John March	4,104	35.8	−0.9
Total formal votes		11,473	99.4	+0.5
Informal votes		67	0.6	−0.5
Turnout		11,540	46.1	−15.2
Labor hold		Swing	+0.9	

==== 1920 ====
1920 Victorian state election: Brunswick
Party	Candidate	Votes	%	±%
Labor	James Jewell	9,764	63.3	−3.9
Nationalist	Albert Batley	5,663	36.7	+9.9
Total formal votes		15,427	98.9	+2.1
Informal votes		165	1.1	−2.1
Turnout		15,592	61.3	+12.1
Labor hold		Swing	−8.5	

=== Elections in the 1910s ===
==== 1917 ====
1917 Victorian state election: Brunswick
Party	Candidate	Votes	%	±%
Labor	James Jewell	7,575	67.2	+5.1
Nationalist	John March	3,141	27.8	−10.1
Ind. Nationalist	James Davis	563	5.0	+5.0
Total formal votes		11,279	96.8	−0.4
Informal votes		377	3.2	+0.4
Turnout		11,656	49.2	+1.0
Two-party-preferred result
Labor	James Jewell		71.8	+9.7
Nationalist	John March		28.2	−9.7
Labor hold		Swing	+9.7	

- Two party preferred vote was estimated.

==== 1914 ====
1914 Victorian state election: Brunswick
Party	Candidate	Votes	%	±%
Labor	James Jewell	6,318	62.1	+0.2
Liberal	Joseph Waxman	3,849	37.9	−0.2
Total formal votes		10,167	97.2	−1.7
Informal votes		298	2.8	+1.7
Turnout		10,465	48.2	−10.0
Labor hold		Swing	+0.2	

==== 1911 ====
1911 Victorian state election: Brunswick
Party	Candidate	Votes	%	±%
Labor	James Jewell	6,199	61.9	N/A
Liberal	David Phillips	3,809	38.1	+38.1
Total formal votes		10,008	98.9	
Informal votes		106	1.1	
Turnout		10,114	58.2	
Labor hold		Swing	N/A	
