= Post-election pendulum for the 1992 Victorian state election =

The following is a Mackerras pendulum for the 1992 Victorian state election.

"Very safe" seats require a swing of over 20 per cent to change, "safe" seats require a swing of 10 to 20 per cent to change, "fairly safe" seats require a swing of between 6 and 10 per cent, while "marginal" seats require a swing of less than 6 per cent.

Liberal/National seats
Marginal
Frankston East	Peter McLellan	LIB	0.2%
Geelong	Ann Henderson	LIB	0.7%
Bendigo West	Max Turner	LIB	1.1%
Essendon	Ian Davis	LIB	1.2%
Tullamarine	Bernie Finn	LIB	1.5%
Ballarat East	Barry Traynor	LIB	1.6%
Ballarat West	Paul Jenkins	LIB	2.7%
Oakleigh	Denise McGill	LIB	2.9%
Ivanhoe	Vin Heffernan	LIB	4.3%
Cranbourne	Gary Rowe	LIB	4.7%
Monbulk	Steve McArthur	LIB	5.3%
Narracan	John Delzoppo	LIB	5.4%
Fairly safe
Knox	Hurtle Lupton	LIB	6.1%
Berwick	Robert Dean	LIB	7.0%
Ripon	Steve Elder	LIB	7.1%
Bayswater	Gordon Ashley	LIB	7.1%
Mordialloc	Geoff Leigh	LIB	7.3%
Prahran	Don Hayward	LIB	7.8%
Bellarine	Garry Spry	LIB	7.9%
Bentleigh	Inga Peulich	LIB	8.2%
Mitcham	Roger Pescott	LIB	8.5%
Bendigo East	Michael John	LIB	9.1%
Burwood	Jeff Kennett	LIB	9.3%
Safe
Eltham	Wayne Philips	LIB	10.0%
Mooroolbark	Lorraine Elliott	LIB	10.1%
South Barwon	Alister Paterson	LIB	10.8%
Seymour	Marie Tehan	LIB	11.0%
Bennettswood	Geoff Coleman	LIB	11.8%
Dromana	Tony Hyams	LIB	12.0%
Gisborne	Tom Reynolds	LIB	12.9%
Mornington	Robin Cooper	LIB	12.9%
Box Hill	Robert Clark	LIB	13.2%
Caulfield	Ted Tanner	LIB	13.9%
Wantirna	Kim Wells	LIB	14.1%
Pakenham	Rob Maclellan	LIB	14.4%
Benambra	Tony Plowman	LIB	14.7%
Evelyn	Jim Plowman	LIB	15.2%
Forest Hill	John Richardson	LIB	15.3%
Polwarth	Ian Smith	LIB	15.8%
Warrandyte	Phil Honeywood	LIB	16.7%
Portland	Denis Napthine	LIB	17.1%
Frankston	Graeme Weideman	LIB	17.5%
Gippsland West	Alan Brown	LIB	17.9%
Doncaster	Victor Perton	LIB	18.1%
Bulleen	David Perrin	LIB	18.2%
Hawthorn	Phil Gude	LIB	18.4%
Glen Waverley	Ross Smith	LIB	19.5%
Shepparton	Don Kilgour	NAT	19.5%
Sandringham	Murray Thompson	LIB	19.9%
Very safe
Benalla	Pat McNamara	NAT	20.8%
Mildura	Craig Bildstien	LIB	20.9%
Kew	Jan Wade	LIB	21.5%
Malvern	Robert Doyle	LIB	22.5%
Brighton	Alan Stockdale	LIB	22.8%
Gippsland East	David Treasure	NAT	23.4%
Gippsland South	Peter Ryan	NAT	23.9%
Murray Valley	Ken Jasper	NAT	24.0%
Warrnambool	John McGrath	NAT	25.8%
Rodney	Noel Maughan	NAT	26.0%
Swan Hill	Barry Steggall	NAT	29.4%
Wimmera	Bill McGrath	NAT	29.6%

Labor seats
Marginal
Dandenong North	Jan Wilson	ALP	0.1%
Carrum	Mal Sandon	ALP	0.9%
Bundoora	Sherryl Garbutt	ALP	1.1%
Yan Yean	Andre Haermeyer	ALP	1.9%
Dandenong	John Pandazopoulos	ALP	3.1%
~~Niddrie~~	~~Bob Sercombe~~^{[4]}	~~ALP~~	~~3.6%~~
Morwell	Keith Hamilton	ALP	4.0%
Albert Park	John Thwaites	ALP	5.8%
Fairly safe
Pascoe Vale	Kelvin Thomson^{[4]}	ALP	8.0%
Springvale	Eddie Micallef	ALP	8.0%
Werribee	Ken Coghill	ALP	8.3%
Clayton	Gerard Vaughan	ALP	8.4%
Keilor	George Seitz	ALP	8.9%
Geelong North	Peter Loney	ALP	9.6%
Safe
Melton	David Cunningham	ALP	10.0%
Altona	Carole Marple	ALP	10.9%
Williamstown	Steve Bracks^{[3]}	ALP	11.0%
~~Coburg~~	~~Tom Roper~~^{[2]}	~~ALP~~	~~11.2%~~
Melbourne	Neil Cole	ALP	12.1%
Mill Park	Alex Andrianopoulos	ALP	12.3%
Richmond	Demetri Dollis	ALP	13.3%
Sunshine	Ian Baker	ALP	13.3%
~~Williamstown~~	~~Joan Kirner~~^{[3]}	~~ALP~~	~~14.2%~~
Northcote	Tony Sheehan	ALP	15.2%
Footscray	Bruce Mildenhall	ALP	16.2%
Preston	Michael Leighton	ALP	16.2%
Coburg	Carlo Carli^{[2]}	ALP	16.3%
Broadmeadows	John Brumby^{[1]}	ALP	16.8% (primary)
~~Broadmeadows~~	~~Jim Kennan~~^{[1]}	~~ALP~~	~~19.4%~~
Very safe
Thomastown	Peter Batchelor	ALP	20.0%
Niddrie	Rob Hulls^{[4]}	ALP	Unopp

== Notes ==
^{1} On 28 June 1993, the Labor member for Broadmeadows, Jim Kennan, resigned. Labor candidate John Brumby won the resulting by-election on 18 September 1993. No two-party count was performed for the by-election.
^{2} In March 1994, the Labor member for Coburg, Tom Roper, resigned. Labor candidate Carlo Carli won the resulting by-election on 14 May 1994.
^{3} On 27 May 1994, the Labor member for Williamstown and former Premier of Victoria, Joan Kirner, resigned. Labor candidate Steve Bracks won the resulting by-election on 13 August 1994.
^{4} Bob Sercombe and Kelvin Thomson, respectively the Labor members for Niddrie and Pascoe Vale, resigned in February 1996 to contest seats at the 1996 federal election. Rob Hulls was elected unopposed to Niddrie at the close of nominations on 29 February 1996. Two nominations were received for Pascoe Vale by 29 February for a March 30 by-election, but the by-election was cancelled when the state election was called for the same day.
