= Candidates of the 1947 Victorian state election =

The 1947 Victorian state election was held on 8 November 1947.

== Retiring Members ==
=== Country ===
- Alfred Kirton MLA (Mornington)

== Legislative Assembly ==
Sitting members are shown in bold text. Successful candidates are highlighted in the relevant colour. Where there is possible confusion, an asterisk (*) is also used.

Electorate	Held by	Labor candidates	Liberal candidates	Country candidates	Other candidates
Albert Park	Labor	**Frank Crean**	Roy Schilling		
Allandale	Country	Thomas Powell	Hector Alcock	**Russell White**	
Ballarat	Liberal	James Miller	**Thomas Hollway**		
Barwon	Ministerial Liberal	Don Ferguson	**Thomas Maltby**		
Benalla	Country		Thomas Nolan	**Frederick Cook**	
Benambra	Country			**Tom Mitchell**	
Bendigo	Labor	**Bill Galvin**	Eric Thomson	Norman Oliver	
Borung	Country			**Wilfred Mibus**	Finlay Cameron (Ind CP)
Box Hill	Labor	**Bob Gray**	George Reid		Reginald Cooper (Ind Lib)
Brighton	Liberal		**Ray Tovell**		Ian Macfarlan (Ind)
Brunswick	Labor	**James Jewell**	Alfred Wall		
Camberwell	Liberal		**Robert Whately**		Walter Fordham (Ind Lib)
Carlton	Labor	**Bill Barry**	Stanley Lang		
Caulfield	Liberal		**Alexander Dennett**		
Clifton Hill	Labor	**Jack Cremean**	Neil McKay		
Coburg	Independent	George Henderson	Walter Perse		**Charlie Mutton** (Ind)
Collingwood	Labor	**Bill Towers**	William Boughton		
Dandenong	Labor	**Frank Field**	William Dawnay-Mould	Alexander Caldwell	
Dundas	Labor	**Bill Slater**	William McDonald		
Elsternwick	Liberal	Gregory Gowans	**John Don**		
Essendon	Labor	**Arthur Drakeford**	Allen Bateman		
Evelyn	Ministerial Liberal	Roderick Leeson	**William Everard**		Patrick McKie (Ind Lib)
Footscray	Labor	**Jack Holland**	William Massey		
Geelong	Labor	**Fanny Brownbill**	Edward Montgomery		
Gippsland East	Country	Thomas Parkinson		**Albert Lind**	
Gippsland North	Labor	**James Johns**		Bill Fulton	
Gippsland South	Country	Percy Vagg		**Herbert Hyland**	
Gippsland West	Country	Fred Rush	Basil Morris	**Matthew Bennett**	
Glen Iris	Independent		Les Norman		**Ian McLaren** (Ind)
Goulburn	Labor	**Joseph Smith**	Philip Grimwade	Cyril Davy	
Grant	Country	Horace Hughes	Tom Austin	**Frederick Holden**	
Hampden	Labor	**Raymond Hyatt**	Henry Bolte		Alfred Matthey (Ind CP)
Hawthorn	Liberal	Charles Murphy	**Fred Edmunds**		Leslie Hollins (Ind)
Ivanhoe	Independent		Rupert Curnow		**Robert Gardner** (Ind); Leighton Weber (Ind Lib)
Kew	Liberal	Rupert Purchase	**Wilfrid Kent Hughes**		
Korong	Country	Ernest Duus		**Albert Dunstan**	
Malvern	Liberal		**Trevor Oldham**		Mascotte Brown (Ind); Andrew Sinclair (Ind Lib)
Melbourne	Labor	**Tom Hayes**	George Crowther		
Mentone	Labor	**George White**	Harry Drew		
Mernda	Country		Arthur Ireland	**Leslie Webster**	Jack Gill (Ind Lab)
Midlands	Labor	**Clive Stoneham**		Thomas Grigg	
Mildura	Labor	**Louis Garlick**		Nathaniel Barclay	
Moonee Ponds	Labor	**Samuel Merrifield**	Wallace Crichton		
Mornington	Country	Bertram Maslen	William Leggatt	Eric Rundle	
Murray Valley	Country	Neil Stewart		**George Moss**	
Northcote	Labor	**John Cain**	Jack McColl		
Oakleigh	Labor	**Squire Reid**	John Lechte		
Polwarth	Country	Edwin Morris		**Edward Guye**	
Portland	Labor	**Robert Holt**	James Lindsey	Harry Hedditch	
Port Melbourne	Labor	**Tom Corrigan**	Stanley Evans		Ralph Gibson (CPA)
Prahran	Labor	**Bill Quirk**	Martin Smith		
Preston	Labor	**William Ruthven**	Frederick Lee		
Rainbow	Country	Raymond Peake		**Keith Dodgshun**	
Richmond	Labor	**Stan Keon**	Roland Leckie		
Ripon	Labor	**Ernie Morton**	Rutherford Guthrie	Leonard Rodda	
Rodney	Country		Morton Garner	**Richard Brose**	
Scoresby	Liberal		**Sir George Knox**		
Shepparton	Country	Edward Newman		**John McDonald**	
St Kilda	Ministerial Liberal	Bill Bourke			**Archie Michaelis** (Ind Lib)
Sunshine	Labor	**Ernie Shepherd**	Lindsay Smith		
Swan Hill	Country	Philip Meehan		**John Hipworth**	Stanley Taylor (Ind CP)
Toorak	Liberal		**Robert Hamilton**		Edgar Morton (Ind Lib); Peter Ryan (Ind)
Warrnambool	Country	Fred Reid		**Henry Bailey**	
Williamstown	Labor	**John Lemmon**	Clifford Rankine		George Paine (Ind Lab)
Wonthaggi	Labor	**William McKenzie**		William Buckingham	

== See also ==
- 1946 Victorian Legislative Council election
