= Members of the Victorian Legislative Assembly, 1947–1950 =

- ←1945–1947 1950–1952→

This is a list of members of the Victorian Legislative Assembly from 1947 to 1950, as elected at the 1947 state election:

| Name | Party | Electorate | Term in office |
|---|---|---|---|
| Henry Bailey | Country | Warrnambool | 1914–1932, 1935–1950 |
| Nathaniel Barclay | Country | Mildura | 1947–1952; 1955–1962 |
| Hon Bill Barry | Labor | Carlton | 1932–1955 |
| Allen Bateman | Liberal | Essendon | 1947–1950 |
| Matthew Bennett | Country | Gippsland West | 1929–1950 |
| Hon Henry Bolte | Liberal | Hampden | 1947–1972 |
| Richard Brose | Country | Rodney | 1944–1964 |
| Fanny Brownbill^{[2]} | Labor | Geelong | 1938–1948 |
| William Buckingham | Country | Wonthaggi | 1947–1955 |
| Hon John Cain | Labor | Northcote | 1917–1957 |
| Frederick Cook | Country | Benalla | 1936–1961 |
| Tom Corrigan | Labor | Port Melbourne | 1942–1952 |
| Frank Crean^{[3]} | Labor | Prahran | 1945–1947; 1949–1951 |
| Jack Cremean^{[5]} | Labor | Clifton Hill | 1945–1949 |
| Rupert Curnow | Liberal | Ivanhoe | 1947–1950 |
| William Dawnay-Mould | Liberal | Dandenong | 1947–1952 |
| Hon Alexander Dennett | Liberal | Caulfield | 1945–1955 |
| Hon Keith Dodgshun | Country | Rainbow | 1938–1955 |
| John Don | Liberal | Elsternwick | 1945–1955 |
| Harry Drew | Liberal | Mentone | 1932–1937, 1947–1950 |
| Hon Sir Albert Dunstan^{[6]} | Country | Korong | 1920–1950 |
| Fred Edmunds | Liberal/Independent | Hawthorn | 1945–1950 |
| William Everard | Liberal | Evelyn | 1917–1950 |
| Bill Fulton | Country | Gippsland North | 1942–1945; 1947–1952 |
| Hon Bill Galvin | Labor | Bendigo | 1945–1955, 1958–1964 |
| Philip Grimwade | Liberal | Goulburn | 1947–1950 |
| Hon Rutherford Guthrie | Liberal | Ripon | 1947–1950 |
| Edward Guye | Country/Liberal | Polwarth | 1940–1958 |
| Robert Bell Hamilton^{[1]} | Liberal | Toorak | 1945–1948 |
| Tom Hayes | Labor | Melbourne | 1924–1955 |
| Harry Hedditch | Country/Liberal | Portland | 1943–1945; 1947–1950 |
| John Hipworth | Country/Liberal | Swan Hill | 1945–1952 |
| Frederick Holden | Country | Grant | 1932–1950 |
| Jack Holland | Labor | Footscray | 1925–1955 |
| Hon Thomas Hollway | Liberal | Ballarat | 1932–1955 |
| Col. Hon Wilfrid Kent Hughes^{[5]} | Liberal | Kew | 1927–1949 |
| Hon Herbert Hyland | Country | Gippsland South | 1929–1970 |
| Arthur Ireland | Liberal | Mernda | 1947–1952 |
| James Jewell^{[4]} | Labor | Brunswick | 1910–1949 |
| Stan Keon^{[5]} | Labor | Richmond | 1945–1949 |
| Brig. Sir George Knox | Liberal | Scoresby | 1927–1960 |
| John Lechte | Liberal/Independent | Oakleigh | 1947–1950 |
| Hon William Leggatt | Liberal | Mornington | 1947–1956 |
| John Lemmon | Labor | Williamstown | 1904–1955 |
| Albert Lind | Country | Gippsland East | 1920–1961 |
| Hon John McDonald | Country | Shepparton | 1936–1955 |
| William McDonald | Liberal | Dundas | 1947–1952; 1955–1970 |
| Sir Thomas Maltby | Liberal | Barwon | 1929–1961 |
| Samuel Merrifield | Labor | Moonee Ponds | 1943–1955 |
| Wilfred Mibus | Country/Liberal | Borung | 1944–1964 |
| Hon Archie Michaelis | Liberal | St Kilda | 1932–1952 |
| Hon Tom Mitchell | Country | Benambra | 1947–1976 |
| Edward Montgomery^{[2]} | Liberal | Geelong | 1948–1950 |
| George Moss | Country | Murray Valley | 1945–1973 |
| Charlie Mutton | Ind. Labor | Coburg | 1940–1967 |
| Les Norman | Liberal | Glen Iris | 1947–1952 |
| Joseph O'Carroll^{[5]} | Labor | Clifton Hill | 1949–1955 |
| Hon Trevor Oldham | Liberal | Malvern | 1933–1953 |
| Bill Quirk^{[3]} | Labor | Prahran | 1945–1948 |
| Peter Randles^{[4]} | Labor | Brunswick | 1949–1955 |
| George Reid | Liberal | Box Hill | 1947–1952; 1955–1973 |
| Edward Reynolds^{[1]} | Liberal | Toorak | 1948–1952 |
| William Ruthven | Labor | Preston | 1945–1961 |
| Arthur Rylah^{[5]} | Liberal | Kew | 1949–1971 |
| Roy Schilling | Liberal | Albert Park | 1947–1950 |
| Frank Scully^{[5]} | Labor | Richmond | 1949–1958 |
| Ernie Shepherd | Labor | Sunshine | 1945–1958 |
| Clive Stoneham | Labor | Midlands | 1942–1970 |
| Brig. Hon Ray Tovell | Liberal | Brighton | 1945–1955 |
| Bill Towers | Labor | Collingwood | 1947–1962 |
| Robert Whately | Liberal | Camberwell | 1945–1956 |
| Russell White | Country | Allandale | 1945–1960 |

^{1} On 15 May 1948, the Liberal member for Toorak, Robert Bell Hamilton, died. Liberal candidate Edward Reynolds won the resulting by-election on 19 June 1948.
^{2} On 10 October 1948, the Labor member for Geelong, Fanny Brownbill, died. Liberal candidate Edward Montgomery won the resulting by-election on 13 November 1948.
^{3} On 16 November 1948, the Labor member for Prahran, Bill Quirk, died. Labor candidate Frank Crean won the resulting by-election on 22 January 1949.
^{4} On 14 May 1949, the Labor member for Brunswick, James Jewell, died. Labor candidate Peter Randles won the resulting by-election on 16 July 1949.
^{5} On 31 October 1949, three members resigned to contest seats at the 1949 election and by-elections were held on 17 December 1949 to fill the vacancies.
- Jack Cremean, the Labor member for Clifton Hill, contested and won Division of Hoddle. Labor candidate Joseph O'Carroll was elected in his stead.
- Wilfrid Kent Hughes, the Liberal member for Kew, contested and won Division of Chisholm. Liberal candidate Arthur Rylah was elected in his stead.
- Stan Keon, the Labor member for Richmond, contested and won Division of Yarra. Labor candidate Frank Scully was elected in his stead.
^{6} On 14 April 1950, the former Premier of Victoria and Country Party member for Korong, Sir Albert Dunstan, died. No by-election was held due to the proximity of the 1950 election.

== Sources ==
- "Find a Member". State Government of Victoria.
