= Members of the Victorian Legislative Assembly, 1992–1996 =

- ←1988–1992 1996–1999→

This is a list of members of the Victorian Legislative Assembly from 1992 to 1996, as elected at the 1992 state election:

Name	Party	Electorate	Term in office
Alex Andrianopoulos	Labor	Mill Park	1985–2002
Gordon Ashley	Liberal	Bayswater	1992–2002
Hon Ian Baker	Labor	Sunshine	1988–1999
Peter Batchelor	Labor	Thomastown	1990–2010
Craig Bildstien	Liberal	Mildura	1988–1996
Steve Bracks ^{[3]}	Labor	Williamstown	1994–2007
Hon Alan Brown	Liberal	Gippsland West	1979–1996
John Brumby ^{[1]}	Labor	Broadmeadows	1993–2010
Carlo Carli ^{[2]}	Labor	Coburg	1994–2010
Robert Clark	Liberal	Box Hill	1988–2018
Hon Ken Coghill	Labor	Werribee	1979–1996
Neil Cole	Labor	Melbourne	1988–1999
Hon Geoff Coleman	Liberal	Bennettswood	1976–1982, 1985–1999
Robin Cooper	Liberal	Mornington	1985–2006
David Cunningham	Labor	Melton	1985–1999
Ian Davis	Liberal	Essendon	1992–1996
Dr Robert Dean	Liberal	Berwick	1992–2002
Hon John Delzoppo	Liberal	Narracan	1982–1996
Demetri Dollis	Labor	Richmond	1988–1999
Robert Doyle	Liberal	Malvern	1992–2006
Lorraine Elliott	Liberal	Mooroolbark	1992–2002
Steve Elder	Liberal	Ripon	1988–1999
Bernie Finn	Liberal	Tullamarine	1992–1999
Sherryl Garbutt	Labor	Bundoora	1989–2006
Hon Phil Gude	Liberal	Hawthorn	1976–1979, 1985–1999
Andre Haermeyer	Labor	Yan Yean	1992–2008
Keith Hamilton	Labor	Morwell	1988–2002
Hon Don Hayward	Liberal	Prahran	1985–1996
Hon Vin Heffernan	Liberal	Ivanhoe	1985–1996
Hon Ann Henderson	Liberal	Geelong	1992–1999
Hon Phil Honeywood	Liberal	Warrandyte	1988–2006
Rob Hulls ^{[4]}	Labor	Niddrie	1996–2012
Tony Hyams	Liberal	Dromana	1992–1996
Ken Jasper	National	Murray Valley	1976–2010
Paul Jenkins	Liberal	Ballarat West	1992–1999
Hon Michael John	Liberal	Bendigo East	1985–1999
Hon Jim Kennan ^{[1]}	Labor	Broadmeadows	1988–1993
Hon Jeff Kennett	Liberal	Burwood	1976–1999
Don Kilgour	National	Shepparton	1991–2002
Hon Joan Kirner ^{[3]}	Labor	Williamstown	1988–1994
Geoff Leigh	Liberal	Mordialloc	1982–2002
Michael Leighton	Labor	Preston	1988–2006
Peter Loney	Labor	Geelong North	1992–2006
Hurtle Lupton	Liberal	Knox	1992–2002
Hon Rob Maclellan	Liberal	Pakenham	1970–2002
Carole Marple	Labor	Altona	1992–1996
Noel Maughan	National	Rodney	1989–2006
Steve McArthur	Liberal	Monbulk	1992–2002
Denise McGill	Liberal	Oakleigh	1992–1999
Hon Bill McGrath	National	Wimmera	1979–1999
John McGrath	National	Warrnambool	1985–1999
Peter McLellan	Liberal	Frankston East	1992–1999
Hon Pat McNamara	National	Benalla	1982–2000
Eddie Micallef	Labor	Springvale	1983–1999
Bruce Mildenhall	Labor	Footscray	1992–2006
Hon Dr Denis Napthine	Liberal	Portland	1988–2015
John Pandazopoulos	Labor	Dandenong	1992–2014
Alister Paterson	Liberal	South Barwon	1992–2002
David Perrin	Liberal	Bulleen	1985–1999
Victor Perton	Liberal	Doncaster	1988–2006
Inga Peulich	Liberal	Bentleigh	1992–2002
Hon Roger Pescott	Liberal	Mitcham	1985–1997
Wayne Phillips	Liberal	Eltham	1992–2002
Hon Jim Plowman	Liberal	Evelyn	1973–1982, 1985–1999
Tony Plowman	Liberal	Benambra	1992–2006
Hon Tom Reynolds	Liberal	Gisborne	1979–1999
John Richardson	Liberal	Forest Hill	1976–2002
Hon Tom Roper ^{[2]}	Labor	Coburg	1973–1994
Gary Rowe	Liberal	Cranbourne	1992–2002
Peter Ryan	National	Gippsland South	1992–2015
Hon Mal Sandon	Labor	Carrum	1988–1996
George Seitz	Labor	Keilor	1982–2010
Bob Sercombe ^{[4]}	Labor	Niddrie	1988–1996
Hon Tony Sheehan	Labor	Northcote	1982–1985, 1988–1998
Hon Ian Smith	Liberal	Polwarth	1967–1983, 1985–1999
Ross Smith	Liberal	Glen Waverley	1985–2002
Garry Spry	Liberal	Bellarine	1992–2002
Barry Steggall	National	Swan Hill	1983–2002
Hon Alan Stockdale	Liberal	Brighton	1985–1999
Ted Tanner	Liberal	Caulfield	1979–1996
Hon Marie Tehan	Liberal	Seymour	1992–1999
Murray Thompson	Liberal	Sandringham	1992–2018
Kelvin Thomson ^{[4]}	Labor	Pascoe Vale	1988–1996
John Thwaites	Labor	Albert Park	1992–2007
Barry Traynor	Liberal	Ballarat East	1992–1999
David Treasure	National	Gippsland East	1992–1999
Max Turner	Liberal	Bendigo West	1992–1996
Gerard Vaughan	Labor	Clayton	1979–1996
Hon Jan Wade	Liberal	Kew	1988–1999
Graeme Weideman	Liberal	Frankston	1976–1982, 1985–1996
Kim Wells	Liberal	Wantirna	1992–present
Jan Wilson	Labor	Dandenong North	1985–1999

^{1} On 28 June 1993, the Labor member for Broadmeadows, Jim Kennan, resigned. Labor candidate John Brumby won the resulting by-election on 18 September 1993.
^{2} In March 1994, the Labor member for Coburg, Tom Roper, resigned. Labor candidate Carlo Carli won the resulting by-election on 14 May 1994.
^{3} On 27 May 1994, the Labor member for Williamstown and former Premier of Victoria, Joan Kirner, resigned. Labor candidate Steve Bracks won the resulting by-election on 13 August 1994.
^{4} Bob Sercombe and Kelvin Thomson, respectively the Labor members for Niddrie and Pascoe Vale, resigned in February 1996 to contest seats at the 1996 federal election. Rob Hulls was elected unopposed to Niddrie at the close of nominations on 29 February 1996. Two nominations were received for Pascoe Vale by 29 February for a 30 March by-election, but the by-election was cancelled when the state election was called for the same day.
