= Electoral results for the district of Brunswick West =

Victoria, Australia, district election results

This is a list of electoral results for the electoral district of Brunswick West in Victorian state elections.

== Members for Brunswick West ==
Member	Party	Term
Campbell Turnbull	Labor	1955–1973
Tom Roper	Labor	1973–1976

The Electoral district of Brunswick was re-created in 1976 with Tom Roper being the member 1976–1992.

== Election results ==
=== Elections in the 1970s ===
1973 Victorian state election: Brunswick West
Party	Candidate	Votes	%	±%
Labor	Tom Roper	11,387	51.9	+0.7
Liberal	Salvatore Gandolfo	7,705	35.1	+1.3
Democratic Labor	John Flint	2,831	12.9	−2.1
Total formal votes		21,923	96.1	+0.3
Informal votes		887	3.9	−0.3
Turnout		22,810	95.0	0.0
Two-party-preferred result
Labor	Tom Roper	11,812	53.9	+0.5
Liberal	Salvatore Gandolfo	10,111	46.1	−0.5
Labor hold		Swing	+0.5	

1970 Victorian state election: Brunswick West
Party	Candidate	Votes	%	±%
Labor	Campbell Turnbull	10,737	51.2	+1.6
Liberal	Walter Dale	7,099	33.8	+2.6
Democratic Labor	John Flint	3,153	15.0	−4.2
Total formal votes		20,989	95.8	0.0
Informal votes		912	4.2	0.0
Turnout		21,901	95.0	+0.8
Two-party-preferred result
Labor	Campbell Turnbull	11,209	53.4	+2.2
Liberal	Walter Dale	9,780	46.6	−2.2
Labor hold		Swing	+2.2	

=== Elections in the 1960s ===
1967 Victorian state election: Brunswick West
Party	Candidate	Votes	%	±%
Labor	Campbell Turnbull	10,958	49.6	−0.1
Liberal	Victor French	6,877	31.2	+1.4
Democratic Labor	John Flint	4,245	19.2	−1.4
Total formal votes		22,080	95.8	
Informal votes		966	4.2	
Turnout		23,046	94.2	
Two-party-preferred result
Labor	Campbell Turnbull	11,304	51.2	−1.4
Liberal	Victor French	10,776	48.8	+1.4
Labor hold		Swing	−1.4	

1964 Victorian state election: Brunswick West
Party	Candidate	Votes	%	±%
Labor	Campbell Turnbull	8,762	52.2	−0.1
Liberal and Country	James Pond	4,362	26.0	+2.6
Democratic Labor	John Flint	3,654	21.8	−2.5
Total formal votes		16,778	95.7	−0.1
Informal votes		755	4.3	+0.1
Turnout		17,533	94.9	+1.1
Two-party-preferred result
Labor	Campbell Turnbull	9,310	55.5	−0.5
Liberal and Country	James Pond	7,468	44.5	+0.5
Labor hold		Swing	−0.5	

1961 Victorian state election: Brunswick West
Party	Candidate	Votes	%	±%
Labor	Campbell Turnbull	9,159	52.3	+1.1
Democratic Labor	John Flint	4,251	24.3	−0.3
Liberal and Country	Norman Glass	4,094	23.4	−0.9
Total formal votes		17,504	95.8	−1.8
Informal votes		758	4.2	+1.8
Turnout		18,262	93.8	0.0
Two-party-preferred result
Labor	Campbell Turnbull	9,797	56.0	+1.1
Liberal and Country	Norman Glass	7,707	44.0	−1.1
Labor hold		Swing	+1.1	

- The two candidate preferred vote was not counted between the Labor and DLP candidates for Brunswick West.

=== Elections in the 1950s ===
1958 Victorian state election: Brunswick West
Party	Candidate	Votes	%	±%
Labor	Campbell Turnbull	9,813	51.2	
Democratic Labor	Peter Randles	4,709	24.6	
Liberal and Country	Alfred Wall	4,649	24.3	
Total formal votes		19,171	97.6	
Informal votes		465	2.4	
Turnout		19,636	93.8	
Two-party-preferred result
Labor	Campbell Turnbull	10,519	54.9	
Liberal and Country	Alfred Wall	8,652	45.1	
Labor hold		Swing		

- Two party preferred vote was estimated.

1955 Victorian state election: Brunswick West
Party	Candidate	Votes	%	±%
Labor	Campbell Turnbull	6,917	44.8	
Labor (A-C)	Peter Randles	4,455	28.9	
Liberal and Country	Alisa Gaston	4,060	26.3	
Total formal votes		15,432	98.0	
Informal votes		315	2.0	
Turnout		15,747	94.6	
Two-candidate-preferred result
Labor	Campbell Turnbull	7,757	50.3	
Labor (A-C)	Peter Randles	7,675	49.7	
Labor hold		Swing		
