= Independent Labor (Australia) =

Political affiliation

- Abbreviation: Ind. Lab
- Victorian Legislative Assembly: 1 / 88

Independent Labor (or Independent Labour) is a description used in Australian politics, often to designate a politician who is an Australian Labor Party (ALP) member but not endorsed by the party at elections, or if sitting in a parliament, not a member of the Labor party room caucus. The label has also been used to describe candidates who identify with the labour movement, but not the ALP.

Registering a party or affiliation as an "Independent Labor" is not permitted in New South Wales under section 64 of the Electoral Act 2017, and the use of the term in electoral material is also considered an offence under section 180 of the act.

As of October 2024, the only MP who is a rank-and-file member of the Labor Party yet is not part of the party's parliamentary caucus is Darren Cheeseman, a member of the Victorian Legislative Assembly.

== History ==
The first Independent Labour MP in federal politics was James Wilkinson, who was elected at the 1901 election. He had been a member of the ALP previously, and rejoined the party in 1903.

The Blackburn-Mutton Labor Party was formed in June 1947 by Doris Blackburn, the member for Bourke, and Charlie Mutton, the member for Coburg in the Victorian Legislative Assembly. It was created as a guarantee company so that both MPs could keep describing themselves as Independent Labor after the ALP attempted to restrict the use of the word "Labor". The party later merged into the Progressive Labor Party.

The Independent Labor Group was a grouping in the New South Wales Legislative Council from 1959 to 1977, after a number of Labor MLCs were expelled from the party for voting against the abolition of the Legislative Council, which was then party policy.

In more recent years, the label has been rarely used outside of local elections. Former MP Brenton Best nominated as an Independent Labor candidate in 2017, and Territory Labor MP Jeff Collins used the label after resigning from the party in 2019, before later joining Territory Alliance.

On 23 August 2021, former Tasmanian Labor leader David O’Byrne resigned from the party caucus to sit as an Independent Labor MP, which he continued to do so until resigning his ALP membership on 4 February 2024.

On 5 August 2023, Ringwood MP Will Fowles was asked to resign from the parliamentary Victorian Labor Party by then-Premier Daniel Andrews following allegations of a serious assault. He remained as a rank-and-file member until resigning from the party in August 2024.

== Local government ==
The "Independent Labor" label is often used at local government elections, especially in states or local government areas where the ALP does not endorse any candidates.

== Similar political descriptions ==
Australian politicians have also been elected under other independent labels, including Independent Liberal, Independent National, Independent Free Trade, Independent UAP and Independent Socialist.

== See also ==
- Independent politicians in Australia
