= 1994 Coburg state by-election =

By-election in the Victorian Legislative Assembly

- 14 May 1994

Electoral district of Coburg in the Victorian Legislative Assembly
- Registered: 28,245
- Turnout: 85.0% (▼8.3)
	First party	Second party	Third party
	ALP	IND	GRE
Candidate	Carlo Carli	Sam Ganci	Andrea Sharam
Party	Labor	Independent	Greens
Popular vote	13,691	5,976	5,368
Percentage	52.8%	23%	20.7%
Swing	▲2	▲23	▲20.7
2CP	66.3%	33.7%
2CP swing	▲5.1	▲33.7
MP before election
Tom Roper
Labor
Elected MP
Carlo Carli
Labor

The 1994 Coburg state by-election was held on 14 May 1994 to elect the next member for Coburg in the Victorian Legislative Assembly, following the resignation of sitting MP Tom Roper on 31 March 1994.

The seat was retained for the Labor Party by candidate Carlo Carli, who held the seat until it was abolished in 2002. Independent candidate Gilbert Boffa later stood as a candidate in the Federal by-election for Kooyong in November.

== Candidates ==
Candidates are listed in ballot paper order. The Liberal Party, which received 29.1% of first preference votes in Coburg at the 1992 state election, did not contest the by-election.

Party	Candidate	Background
Independent	Sam Ganci	President of the Coburg Chamber of Commerce and Industry
Labor	Carlo Carli	Ministerial Adviser in Housing
Independent	Gilbert Boffa	
Greens	Andrea Sharam	Activist

== Results ==
1994 Coburg state by-election
Party	Candidate	Votes	%	±%
Labor	Carlo Carli	13,691	52.8	+2.0
Independent	Sam Ganci	5,976	23.0	+23.0
Greens	Andrea Sharam	5,368	20.7	+20.7
Independent	Gilbert Boffa	906	3.5	+3.5
Total formal votes		25,941	91.8	−2.2
Informal votes		2,304	8.2	+2.2
Turnout		28,245	85.0	−7.3
Labor hold		Swing	N/A	

== See also ==
- List of Victorian state by-elections
