= Doris Blackburn =

Australian activist and legislator (1889–1970)

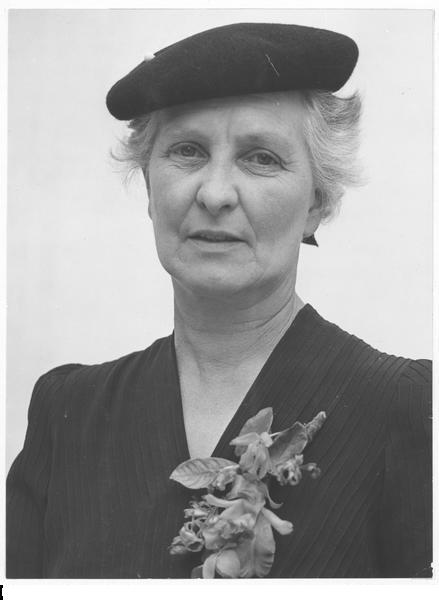

Member of the Australian Parliament for Bourke
- In office 28 September 1946 – 10 December 1949
- Preceded by: Bill Bryson
- Succeeded by: Seat abolished

Personal details
- Born: Doris Amelia Hordern; 18 September 1889 Melbourne, Victoria, Australia
- Died: 12 December 1970 (aged 81) Coburg, Victoria, Australia
- Party: Independent; Australian Labor Party (until 1937); Blackburn-Mutton Labor Party (1947–1950); Progressive Labor Party (1950–1955)
- Spouse: Maurice Blackburn (m. 1914–1944)

Doris Amelia Blackburn (née Hordern; 18 September 1889 – 12 December 1970) was an Australian social reformer and politician. She served in the House of Representatives from 1946 to 1949, the second woman after Enid Lyons to do so. Blackburn was a prominent socialist and originally a member of the Labor Party. She was married to Maurice Blackburn, a Labor MP, but he was expelled from the party in 1937 and she resigned from the party in solidarity. Her husband died in 1944, and she was elected to his former seat at the 1946 federal election – the first woman elected to parliament as an independent (and the third woman elected to parliament overall). However, Blackburn served only a single term before being defeated. She later served as president of the Women's International League for Peace and Freedom.

== Early life ==
Born in Hawthorn, Melbourne, Victoria to Lebbeus Hordern, estate agent, and his wife Louisa Dewson (née Smith), Doris Hordern became involved in women's rights and peace issues from a young age and served as the campaign secretary of Vida Goldstein, the first woman to stand for election to federal parliament in Australia. She married Maurice Blackburn, a fellow firebrand socialist, in Melbourne on 10 December 1914 and spent their honeymoon organizing anti-war and anti-conscription campaigns.

== Politics ==
While her husband served at different times as an Australian Labor Party (ALP) member of the Victorian and Federal parliaments, Blackburn continued to work on social issues, some of which brought her into conflict with the Labor Party (of which she too was a member) and following Maurice's expulsion from the party in 1937, she resigned from the ALP. Her husband continued to sit in parliament as an independent but lost his seat at the 1943 federal election to the official Labor candidate, and died the following year.

== Parliament ==
Upset at Labor's treatment of her husband, Blackburn stood as an Independent Labour candidate for her husband's old seat of Bourke at the 1946 election, and by winning it she became only the second woman to be elected to the Australian House of Representatives.

In parliament Blackburn, who shared the cross benches with fellow former Labor member Jack Lang, championed similar issues to those of her late husband, gaining nationwide notoriety in 1947 as the only MP to vote against the Atomic Energy Bill. She served as the national President of the Council for Civil Liberties.

In June 1947, Maurice and another expelled state Labor politician Charlie Mutton founded the Blackburn-Mutton Labor Party (BMLP).

Following an electoral redistribution, her seat of Bourke was abolished, and at the 1949 election she contested the newly established seat of Wills. In a contest with both the Labor and Liberal parties, she came third with 20 percent. Following the loss, the BMLP merged into the Progressive Labor Party in October 1950, with Blackburn being the provisional president. She stood in Wills again at the 1951 election as the Progressive Labor Party candidate. She came third with 17 percent of the vote. In both times, the seat was convincingly won by Labor.

== Affiliations ==
As of September 1949, Blackburn was a charter member of the Australian Peace Council.

Blackburn subsequently remained active in social issues, serving as president of the Women's International League for Peace and Freedom. Realising the problems faced by Aborigines, following a visit to the Woomera Rocket Range, she co-founded, with Douglas Nicholls, the Aborigines Advancement League and the Federal Council for Aboriginal Advancement.

== Death and legacy ==
Blackburn died on 12 December 1970 in Coburg, Victoria, aged 81. She had two sons and two daughters, one of whom died before her.

The archives of Blackburn and her spouse Maurice are held by the State Library of Victoria.

== See also ==
- List of peace activists

Parliament of Australia
Preceded by Bill Bryson	Member for Bourke; 1946–1949	Division abolished
