= Frank Keane =

Australian politician

Francis Peter Keane (13 January 1863 – 15 May 1940) was an Australian politician.

He was born in Ballarat East to labourer Michael Keane and Catherine Meehan. He left school at the age of twelve to work as a cooper. From 1883 he was a member of the Coopers' Union; he found difficulty with employment due to his union involvement. In 1889 he married Alice Feezee Williams, with whom he had four children. A founding member of the Coburg branch of the Labor Party in 1902, he spent two years farming at Toora in 1910 before returning to Melbourne. From 1913 to 1922 he was a member of Coburg Town Council. In 1924 he was elected to the Victorian Legislative Assembly as the Labor member for Essendon; he transferred to Coburg in 1927. He served until his death in Coburg in 1940.

Victorian Legislative Assembly
| Preceded by Thomas Ryan | Member for Essendon; 1924–1927 | Succeeded by Arthur Drakeford |
| New seat | Member for Coburg; 1927–1940 | Succeeded by Charlie Mutton |
