= Tim Read =

Australian politician and general practitioner (1962–2026)

- Campaign portrait, 2022

Member of the Victorian Legislative Assembly for Brunswick
- In office 24 November 2018 – 19 September 2026
- Preceded by: Jane Garrett

Personal details
- Born: 1962 Melbourne, Victoria, Australia
- Died: 19 September 2026 (aged 64) Melbourne, Victoria, Australia
- Party: Greens
- Education: University of Melbourne
- Profession: General practitioner; medical researcher; politician
- Website: www.timread.org.au

Tim Read (1962 – 19 September 2026) was an Australian politician who was a member of the Victorian Legislative Assembly, representing the district of Brunswick from November 2018 until his death in September 2026. He was a member of the Victorian Greens and served as the party's spokesperson for Health, Justice, Integrity and Science; he was also a general practitioner and medical researcher, with a PhD on the epidemiology of sexually transmitted infections (STIs).

== Early life and career ==
Read was born in Melbourne in 1962. From 1985, he attended the University of Melbourne where he graduated with a Bachelor of Medicine, Bachelor of Surgery degree. He worked as a general practitioner in community health. He began specialist training and from 1998 was a sexual-health physician. He later became the site principal at the Melbourne Sexual Health Centre. He was also a sexual health physician at the Royal Melbourne Hospital, as part of the Victorian Infectious Diseases Service.

In 2014, he completed his Doctor of Philosophy thesis titled "Studies in the epidemiology of human papillomavirus, the early detection of anal cancer and the control of human immunodeficiency virus". In 2015, he was awarded a four-year National Health and Medical Research Council Early Career Fellowship at Monash University.

As a medical researcher, Read contributed to over 60 peer-reviewed articles in medical literature, focusing on sexual health and men who have sex with men. His research topics include the symptoms and treatment of mycoplasma genitalium infections, the reliability and provision of HIV tests, the effects of the human papillomavirus (HPV) vaccine on genital warts, oral HPV infection, the size of occurrences of anal cancer, and non-consensual condom removal.

== State politics ==
Read had previously run for the Greens at the 2013 federal election for Wills, and at the 2014 Victorian election for Brunswick. In the 2018 Victorian election he won in Brunswick, the first time a non-Labor-aligned MP had been elected for the seat.

In Parliament, Read campaigned on the issues of climate change, the over-incarceration and deaths in custody of Aboriginal Victorians, and the promotion of active transportation and bike safety. His inaugural speech in Parliament listed Victoria's biggest public health challenges as: heatwaves and climate change, our approach to drugs and crime, and diabetes.

In 2019, he called for pill-testing and the decriminalisation of public drunkenness in his first two adjournment matters, for the latter calling on the Attorney-General to 'form a working group to establish a process to care for people found to be intoxicated in public' and to 'establish appropriate facilities, instead of relying on police cells' – the path to decriminalisation ultimately announced by the Victorian government later that year.

As a prominent drafter of private members bills, in his first term he was responsible for the Victorian Greens' bills to introduce pill-testing, reform Victoria's bail laws, raise the age of criminal responsibility to 14, and to strengthen political integrity laws and the Independent Broad-based Anti-corruption Commission (IBAC). He also sought to amend legislation to raise Victoria's renewable energy target from 50% to 100% renewable energy by 2030.

In 2020 he was credited in playing a key role in preventing a controversial change to the Judicial Proceedings Reports Act 1958 which would have potentially criminalised the families of dead victims of sexual assault naming the victim, unless they had first obtained a court order.

He was part of a successful campaign to reduce restrictions on gay men donating blood, although he continued to advocate for a further easing of the remaining restrictions.

From March 2023 until his passing, Read was the Chair of the Integrity and Oversight Committee. He was elected to the role following the Andrews Government's decision to have a non-government chair. In August 2023, he was involved in a "spat" with Victorian Labor MP Belinda Wilson, after he supported a motion condemning her and her Labor colleagues for their questions which were perceived as "attempting to smear" the Commissioner. Wilson later apologised to Read for shouting.

In January 2026, Read announced he would not contest the 2026 Victorian state election, following a metastatic cancer diagnosis.

=== COVID-19 pandemic ===
Read was the only medical doctor sitting in the Victorian Parliament during the pandemic, and was the Victorian Greens spokesperson for health throughout the period. The Victorian Greens adopted a non-partisan, health and science-backed policy to manage the pandemic, largely seeking to work collaboratively with the Victorian Labor Government during the crisis, including negotiating the controversial amendments to the Public Health and Wellbeing Act 2008. However, Read also publicly spoke against the 'military' response of Victoria Police towards anti-lockdown protesters, and against the need for Victorians to be locked out of their State when the COVID-19 virus was already known to be circulating in Victoria. Noting rising COVID-19 hospitalisations, in May 2022 he accused the government of "sleepwalking towards a health crisis", and advocated for a government to launch a pre-emptive public health campaign for winter to promote masks, indoor air-quality and government grants for HEPA filters, and vaccination. Despite support from the Australian Medical Association, the Victorian Premier criticised his calls as "pure rank politics", stating, "I'm terribly sorry but I'm not taking public health advice from them (the Greens), I'm just not." The Premier reiterated that stance in a response to Read in question time on 7 June, stating: "On the notion that Victorians need to be reminded about the efficacy of mask wearing, the clear public health benefits of mask wearing, together with the benefits of getting vaccinated ... I reckon that Victorians know a bit about all of that because they have lived it for 2½ years. So, with the greatest of respect to the member for Brunswick, I do not think a further TV commercial campaign or a 'campaign', as he puts it, is necessarily needed."

However, when faced with over 700 Victorian COVID-19 hospitalisations, on 12 July the Premier belatedly announced the program Read had been calling for, a "Stay Well for Winter Campaign" across TV, radio, outdoor and digital channels focusing on mask wearing, ventilation and vaccination, as well as an extension of the HEPA filter government grant program. In July 2022, Read called for the government to offer people free masks to people on public transport, a move subsequently announced by the Victorian government in August that year.

== Death ==
Read died on 19 September 2026, following his diagnosis with melanoma the previous November. He was 64. A statement released by the Victorian Greens commemorated his work, and wrote that he died "surrounded by family". His family requested that, in lieu of flowers, donations be sent to Friends of the Earth and to the Inner North Community Foundation.

Parliament of Victoria
Preceded by Jane Garrett	Member for Brunswick; 2018–2026	Succeeded by TBD
