= Peter Gavin (Australian politician) =

Australian politician

Peter Murray Gavin (born 27 February 1949) is a former Australian politician.

Born in Melbourne to James Murray Gavin and Amy Gullock, both public servants, Gavin attended Catholic schools in Melbourne before studying at La Trobe University, where he received a Bachelor of Arts and a Master of Business Administration.

Gavin joined the Labor Party in 1967, and in that capacity was involved in student politics on La Trobe University's Student Representative Council. He worked for the Commonwealth Department of Labour and National Service from 1971, and the Department of Employment and Industrial Relations from 1973.

From 1973 to 1974 Gavin was secretary of the Pascoe Vale-West Coburg branch of the Labor Party, and from 1975 to 1978 was founding secretary of the North Coburg-Merlynston branch, becoming its president in 1979.

In 1979 Gavin was elected to the Victorian Legislative Assembly as the member for Coburg. For the 1992 election, Gavin was forced to move to contest the seat of Tullamarine after Tom Roper, whose seat had been abolished, laid claim to Coburg, which was initially called Brunswick when the new electoral boundaries were released on 19 November 1990 and the Labor Party preselection nominations had to be submitted by the end of February 1991. The seat of Brunswick was renamed Coburg in late March 1991. Gavin was defeated in the election held on 3 October 1992.

Victorian Legislative Assembly
Preceded by Jack Mutton	Member for Coburg; 1979–1992	Succeeded by Tom Roper
