= Jane Garrett =

Australian politician (1973–2022)

The Honourable Jane Garrett

Member of the Victorian Legislative Council for Eastern Victoria Region
- In office 24 November 2018 – 2 July 2022
- Succeeded by: Tom McIntosh

Member of the Victorian Legislative Assembly for Brunswick
- In office 27 November 2010 – 24 November 2018
- Preceded by: Carlo Carli
- Succeeded by: Tim Read

12th Mayor of Yarra
- In office November 2009 – November 2010
- Preceded by: Amanda Stone
- Succeeded by: Alison Clarke

Personal details
- Born: Jane Furneaux Garrett; 16 March 1973 Melbourne, Victoria, Australia
- Died: 2 July 2022 (aged 49) Melbourne, Victoria, Australia
- Party: Labor
- Spouse: James Higgins
- Children: 3

Jane Furneaux Garrett (16 March 1973 – 2 July 2022) was an Australian politician. She was the Labor Party member for Brunswick in the Victorian Legislative Assembly from 2010 until 2018, when she transferred to the Victorian Legislative Council representing Eastern Victoria.

== Early life and education ==
Garrett was born and raised in northern Melbourne and was educated at Radford College followed by the Australian National University, where she studied law.

== Career ==
Jane became an Associate to Justice Alan Boultan of the Australian Industrial Relations Commission in 1997, was an articled clerk with Holding Redlich in 1998, a union officer with the Transport Workers' Union in 1999, a senior adviser to Steve Bracks from 2000 to 2004 and a lawyer at Slater and Gordon from 2004 to 2010. She was also a City of Yarra councillor from 2008 to 2010 and was mayor in 2010.

=== Victorian Parliament ===
Garrett was elected to the Legislative Assembly at the 2010 state election after winning Labor endorsement to contest the increasingly marginal seat of Brunswick. In 2011, she was elected national junior vice-president of the Labor Party, serving in that capacity until 2017. In opposition, Garrett was Parliamentary Secretary to the Shadow Minister for Police and Emergency Services from February 2012 to December 2013 and Shadow Cabinet Secretary from December 2013 until Labor's victory at the 2014 state election.

Garrett became Minister for Emergency Services and Minister for Consumer Affairs, Gaming and Liquor Regulation in December 2014 following Labor's return to government. She was reportedly viewed at one stage as a potential future Labor leader. She resigned from the Andrews Ministry on 9 June 2016 following a bitter dispute between the Country Fire Authority (CFA), the United Firefighters Union, and the Victorian government over an enterprise bargaining agreement, during which she had publicly fallen out with Premier Daniel Andrews.

In November 2016, Garrett announced on a Facebook post that she had recently undergone a successful operation for breast cancer, and would be taking four months' leave from parliament for treatment and recovery.

Following Garrett's resignation from Cabinet, she was credited with a key role in the shift of her Industrial Left subfaction, which included the Construction, Forestry, Mining and Energy Union, away from Andrews' Socialist Left faction and into an alliance with right-wing powerbroker Adem Somyurek.

On 27 September 2017, Garrett announced she would not contest Brunswick at the next state election, and would seek preselection for the Victorian Legislative Council seat of Western Metropolitan Region. Her preselection bid was unsuccessful, with Labor's left faction backing Ingrid Stitt, branch secretary of the Australian Services Union. However, she was saved from losing preselection when a wide-ranging deal proposed by Somyurek saw her preselected to head the Labor ticket in Eastern Victoria Region, and she successfully shifted to the Legislative Council at the 2018 election.

In her new capacity in the Legislative Council, Garrett served as Parliamentary Secretary for Jobs from 2018 until her death. In December 2021, Garrett announced that she would retire from politics at the 2022 state election.

== Death ==
Garrett's cancer returned in 2022, and she died on 2 July 2022 at the age of 49 in Melbourne.

Victorian Legislative Assembly
| Preceded by Carlo Carli | Member for Brunswick; 2010–2018 | Succeeded by Tim Read |
Political offices
| Preceded by Kim Wells | Minister for Emergency Services; 2014–2016 | Succeeded by James Merlino |
| Preceded by Heidi Victoria as Minister for Consumer Affairs | Minister for Consumer Affairs, Gaming and Liquor Regulation; 2014–2016 | Succeeded by Marlene Kairouz |
| Preceded by Edward O'Donohue as Minister for Liquor and Gaming Regulation | Minister for Consumer Affairs, Gaming and Liquor Regulation; 2014–2016 | Succeeded by Marlene Kairouz |
