= Jack Mutton =

Australian politician

Member of the Victorian Legislative Assembly for Coburg
- In office 29 April 1967 – 1979
- Preceded by: Charlie Mutton
- Succeeded by: Peter Gavin

Councillor of the City of Broadmeadows for Campbellfield Riding
- In office 1954–1970

Mayor of City of Broadmeadows
- In office 1966–1967
- In office 1957–1958

Personal details
- Born: John Patrick Mutton; 9 March 1915 Fawkner, Victoria, Australia
- Died: 20 June 2006 (aged 91) Epping, Victoria, Australia
- Party: Independent
- Other political affiliations: Labor (1934–unknown, then unknown until 1966); Progressive Labor (1950–1955)
- Parents: Charlie Mutton (father); Annie Maria Peachey (mother)

John Patrick Mutton (9 March 1915 – 20 June 2006) was an Australian politician.

He was born in Fawkner, the son of Charlie Mutton and Annie Maria Peachey. He attended the local state school and became a panel beater, joining both the Labor Party and the Vehicle Builders' Union in 1934. On 17 January 1938 he married Eileen Fitzpatrick, with whom he had two sons. From 1940 he was a member of the Sheet Metal Workers' Union, and he owned and ran a panel-beating business.

In 1954, Mutton followed his father and was elected as a Progressive Labor councillor in the Broadmeadows City Council. He served in the Council until 1970, with two terms as mayor from 1957 to 1958 and from 1966 to 1967. In 1966, he left the Labor Party, and the following year he was elected to the Victorian Legislative Assembly as the independent member for Coburg. He generally supported Labor in the Assembly, and he was defeated in 1979. Mutton died in 2006 in Epping.

Victorian Legislative Assembly
Preceded by Charlie Mutton	Member for Coburg; 1967–1979	Succeeded by Peter Gavin
