= Blackburn-Mutton Labor Party =

Blackburn-Mutton Labor Party Blackburn and Mutton Labor Party Inc.
- General Secretary: Harold Nicholls
- Founders: Doris Blackburn; Charlie Mutton
- Founded: 26 June 1947; 77 years ago
- Dissolved: 9 October 1950; 74 years ago
- Split from: Australian Labor Party
- Preceded by: Blackburn and Mutton Labor Supporters' Committee
- Merged into: Progressive Labor Party
- House of Representatives: 1 / 75 (1947−1949)
- Victorian Legislative Assembly: 1 / 65 (1947−1950)

The Blackburn-Mutton Labor Party (BMLP), also known as the Blackburn and Mutton Labor Party, Blackburn-Mutton Group and alternatively spelt Labour, was an Australian political party.

The party was formed in June 1947 by Doris Blackburn, the member for Bourke in the House of Representatives, and Charlie Mutton, the member for Coburg in the Victorian Legislative Assembly. It was created as a guarantee company so that both MPs could keep describing themselves as "Independent Labor" after the Australian Labor Party attempted to restrict the use of the word "Labor".

Mutton was re-elected in Coburg for the BMLP in 1947 and 1950.

At the 1949 federal election, Bourke was abolished as a seat and Blackburn contested the new division of Wills. She had 20.6% of the vote, but was unsuccessful.

Daniel Healy contested the 1949 Brunswick state by-election for the party, receiving 19.8% of the vote.

In October 1950, the BMLP merged into the new Progressive Labor Party.
