= Gregory Gowans =

Supreme Court Judge

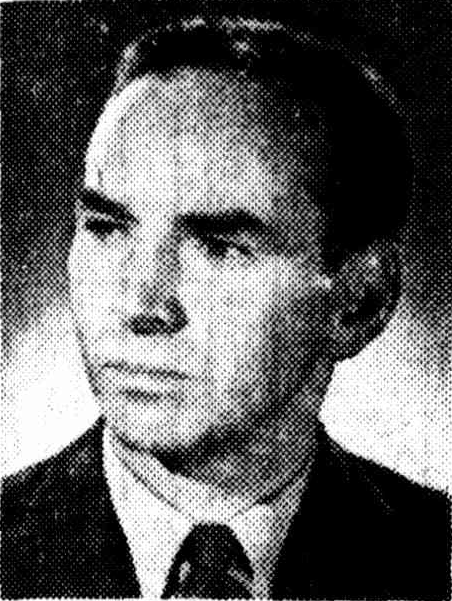
Gowans in 1949

Sir Urban Gregory Joseph Gowans QC (9 September 1904 – 1 April 1994) was an Australian lawyer and judge who served on the Supreme Court of Victoria from August 1961 to September 1976.

In 1904, Gowans was born in Boulder, Western Australia to Hannah Gowans (née Connolly) and James Gowans. His mother died when he was six years old having been accidentally poisoned by a splinter containing arsenic oxide — a by-product of the mining industry at that time. Gowans' father enrolled him and his four brothers at Christian Brothers College Kalgoorlie. Gowans won a scholarship to attend the University of Western Australia where he received a Bachelor of Arts, and a further scholarship from the University of Melbourne where he studied law.

Gowans was counsel assisting in the 1939 bushfires Royal Commission at age 34. He defended an RAAF pilot against a high profile mutiny charge in 1941. During World War II he was based in Victoria Barracks as Director of War Organisation of Industry.

Gowans was an establishment figure, but left-leaning. He twice assisted Labor Attorney General Doc Evatt, once in the unsuccessful attempt to nationalise the banks in 1948, and again in the successful High Court challenge to the Menzies' Government attempt to ban the Communist Party in 1950. He was the Labor Party candidate for the state seat of Elsternwick in 1947, losing by a wide margin in a seat that Labor had not previously contested.

In 1960, Gough Whitlam praised Gowans' articles for The Age on the rights of individuals accused of communism.

Gowans was made King's Counsel in 1949. He appeared in the Privy Council in London on five occasions in the 1950s on constitutional and criminal law appeals. In 1961, Gowans was appointed to the Supreme Court of Victoria, where he served for 15 years.

On 1 January 1974, Gowans was knighted for distinguished service to the law.

In 1978-9, Gowans chaired an enquiry into controversial land dealings in Victoria, as a result of which, in the words of the senate opposition leader of the time, "a federal Treasurer resigned; two Victorian Ministers have resigned; two members of the Victorian Liberal Parliamentary Party have been expelled from the Party; two people have been committed to trial in relation to certain offences and a series of mysterious burglaries connected with the participants have occurred."

Gowans married Mona Ann Jane Freeman in 1937.

Gowans' portrait, by Archibald Douglas Colquhoun, hangs in the Art Gallery of New South Wales.

== See also ==
- List of Judges of the Supreme Court of Victoria
