= 1994 Williamstown state by-election =

By-election in the Victorian Legislative Assembly

- 13 August 1994

Electoral district of Williamstown in the Victorian Legislative Assembly
- Registered: 33,159
- Turnout: 85.7% (▼9.0)
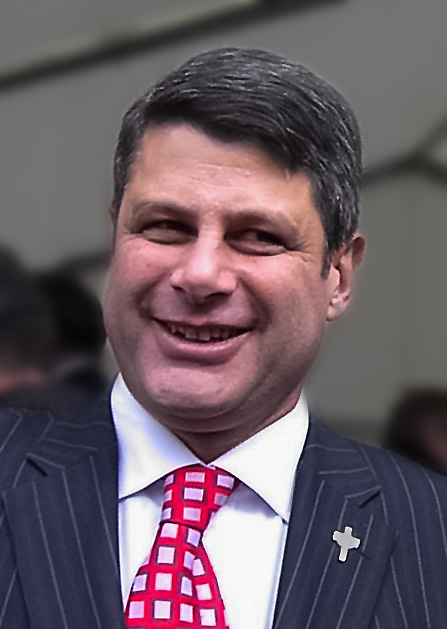

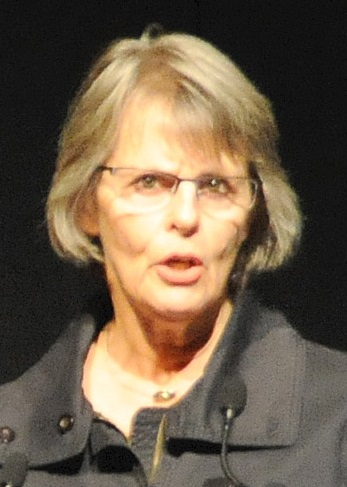
	First party	Second party	Third party
			IND
Candidate	Steve Bracks	Lyn Allison	Chris McConville
Party	Labor	Democrats	Independent
Popular vote	15,362	6,252	5,109
Percentage	57.5%	23.4%	19.1%
Swing	▼1.2	▲23.4	▲19.1
2CP	61.0%	39.0%
2CP swing	▼3.1	▲39.0
MP before election
Joan Kirner
Labor
Elected MP
Steve Bracks
Labor

The 1994 Williamstown state by-election was held on 13 August 1994 to elect the next member for Williamstown in the Victorian Legislative Assembly, following the resignation of sitting MP and former premier Joan Kirner on 27 May 1994.

The seat was retained for the Labor Party by candidate Steve Bracks, who went on to become Premier of Victoria from 1999 until 2007. Australian Democrats candidate Lyn Allison was elected as a senator for Victoria in 1996 and became the party's leader in 2004.

== Candidates ==
Candidates are listed in ballot paper order. The Liberal Party, which received 29.2% of first preference votes in Williamstown at the 1992 state election, did not contest the by-election.

Party	Candidate	Background
Democrats	Lyn Allison	Port Melbourne councillor
Labor	Steve Bracks	Victorian Printing Industry Training Board executive director
Independent	Chris McConville	

== Results ==
1994 Williamstown state by-election
Party	Candidate	Votes	%	±%
Labor	Steve Bracks	15,362	57.5	−1.2
Democrats	Lyn Allison	6,252	23.4	+23.4
Independent	Chris McConville	5,109	19.1	+19.1
Total formal votes		26,723	94.1	−0.3
Informal votes		1,684	5.9	+0.3
Turnout		28,407	85.7	−9.0
Two-candidate-preferred result
Labor	Steve Bracks	16,309	61.0	−3.1
Democrats	Lyn Allison	10,410	39.0	+39.0
Labor hold				

== See also ==
- 2007 Williamstown state by-election
