= Progressive Labor Party (Victoria) =

- Leader: Charlie Mutton
- President: Doris Blackburn
- General Secretary: B. W. McIlroy
- Founded: 9 October 1950; 74 years ago
- Dissolved: Late 1955; 70 years ago
- Split from: Australian Labor Party
- Preceded by: Blackburn-Mutton Labor Party
- Victorian Legislative Assembly: 1 / 65 (1950−1955)
- Broadmeadows Shire Council: 2 / 12 (1954−1955)

The Progressive Labor Party (PLP), alternatively spelt Progressive Labour, was an Australian political party active in Victoria.

== History ==
The party was formed in October 1950, absorbing the Blackburn-Mutton Labor Party (BMLP), which was led by Charlie Mutton, the member for Coburg in the Victorian Legislative Assembly. Former BLMP MP Doris Blackburn became the PLP's president after its formation.

Blackburn contested the division of Wills at the 1951 federal election. She was unsuccessful, coming in third place with 17.6% of the vote.

Mutton was the only candidate endorsed by the PLP at the 1952 Victorian state election. He was re-elected despite a 4.4% swing against him.

The PLP won a second representative when it successfully contested a by-election for Campbellfield Riding on Broadmeadows Shire Council in July 1954, with Robert Warnock defeating Labor after the resignation of councillor B. Foulsham.

One month later at the statewide local government elections in August 1954, Mutton's son, Jack Mutton, was also elected to Campbellfield Riding. The seat had formerly been held by his father before his retirement from local government in 1953.

Mutton contested the 1955 state election for the PLP, and was again re-elected. However, the party faded away by the end of the year.

Members of the Mutton family continued serving as either ALP or independent members in the Victorian parliament until 1979.

== Elected representatives ==
=== Victorian Legislative Assembly ===
- Charlie Mutton (1950−1955)

=== Broadmeadows Shire Council ===
- Robert Warnock (1954−1955)
- Jack Mutton (1954−1955)
