= Peter Randles =

Australian politician

Peter John Randles (10 June 1923 – 12 April 2008), Australian politician, was a member of the Victorian Legislative Assembly for the Electoral district of Brunswick, representing the Labor Party, from 1949 to 1955.

== Professional career ==
Following the Labor Party split in 1955, he joined the Australian Labor Party (Anti-Communist) (later the Democratic Labor Party). At the state election a month later, his seat was abolished. He unsuccessfully contested the new electorate of Brunswick West.
