= James Jewell (politician) =

Australian politician

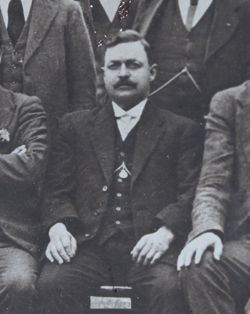
James Robert Jewell

James Robert Jewell (15 October 1869 – 14 May 1949) was an Australian politician. He was a Labor Party member of the Victorian Legislative Assembly from 1910 to 1949, representing the electorate of Brunswick. He was the party whip from 1924 to 1949. Jewell railway station on the Upfield railway line was named in his honour.

Jewell was born in Smithfield West, South Australia, the child of a miner father and schoolteacher mother. His family later moved to Melbourne. He was employed by a butcher from 1885 to 1888, was briefly a gold miner at Whittlesea, and then worked for the New Northcote Brick Company to 1891. He worked for a butchering firm from 1891 to 1894, as a steam engine driver for L. B. Coulsell from 1894 to 1895, spent two months working for a Bendigo smallgoodsman, and then worked as an agent for W. C. Angliss & Company to 1900. He later opened a butchers shop in Brunswick, expanding to three, but reducing to one as a result of the Great Depression. He was elected to the City of Brunswick council in 1905, serving until 1914, and was mayor from 1908 to 1909.

Jewell was elected to the Legislative Assembly at a 1910 by-election following the resignation of Frank Anstey to enter federal politics. Jewell soundly defeated incumbent mayor and former MLA Frederick Hickford, who had stood for the conservative Ministerialists. In a 1914 speech reflecting on his early years, he spoke of his advocacy for reforming the state's treatment of neglected children, opposed the creation of the Country Roads Board, and mentioned that he had taken an active part in the opening of a technical school at Brunswick. Jewell opposed conscription during World War I. He appeared for the tramway workers in the industrial courts during the 1923 Melbourne tram strike. He was appointed party whip in 1924, and held that role both in government and in opposition until his death.

Jewell was never seriously challenged for re-election throughout his 39-year career in the Assembly, although he was opposed a number of times. In 1946, he was presented with an inscribed whip as tribute for his service at a ceremony attended by members of all parties, but was too ill to attend. The Argus reported that attendees referred to Jewell as "the man who has never been heard to say a hard word about anyone" and "the most popular man in the House".

Jewell died in office on 14 May 1949, after having reportedly been in "indifferent health" for several years. He was buried at Coburg Cemetery.

On 1 February 1954, the former South Brunswick railway station was renamed Jewell railway station in his honour.
