= Electoral district of Brunswick =

State electoral district of Victoria, Australia

Brunswick Victoria—Legislative Assembly
- Interactive map of electoral district boundaries from the 2022 state election
- State: Victoria
- Dates current: 1904–1955; 1976–1992; 2002–present
- MP: Vacant
- Namesake: Brunswick
- Electors: 53,340 (2018)
- Area: 14 km^{2} (5.4 sq mi)
- Demographic: Inner metropolitan
- Coordinates: 37°46′S 144°58′E

The electoral district of Brunswick is an electorate of the Victorian Legislative Assembly. It covers an area of 14 square kilometres (5.4 sq mi) in inner northern Melbourne, and includes the suburbs of Brunswick, Brunswick East, Carlton North, Fitzroy North, Princes Hill and parts of Brunswick West. It lies within the Northern Metropolitan Region of the upper house, the Legislative Council. The seat is currently vacant after the death of the previous MP Tim Read in September 2026. The seat will remain vacant until the 2026 Victorian state election in November 2026

Historically a very safe seat for the Labor Party, Brunswick has in recent elections seen an increase in support for the Greens, who won the seat in 2018 and retained it at the 2022 election.

The seat has had three periods of existence. The seat was first formed in 1904 and abolished in 1955, recreated in 1976 and abolished again in 1992, and again re-established in 2002. Prior to 2018, the seat was always held by Labor, apart from two months in 1955 when incumbent MP Peter Randles defected to the Australian Labor Party (Anti-Communist) in the Australian Labor Party split of 1955.

Brunswick was first won in 1904 by Labor candidate Frank Anstey. Anstey resigned to enter federal politics in 1910, forcing a by-election which was won by former Brunswick mayor James Jewell. Jewell was member for Brunswick for 39 years, and served for 25 years as either Government or Opposition Whip. Jewell died in office in 1949, necessitating a by-election, which was won for Labor by Peter Randles. Randles resigned from the Labor Party and joined the new Australian Labor Party (Anti-Communist) in the 1955 Labor split, but Brunswick was abolished that year and he contested and lost the new seat of Brunswick West.

The Brunswick seat was re-established in 1976, and was won by Tom Roper, the Labor member for abolished Brunswick West, who would hold it until it was abolished again in 1992. Roper held a number of prominent ministries in the Cain government, including Minister for Health (1982–1985), Minister for Transport (1985–1987) and Minister for Planning and Environment (1987–1990), and was then promoted to Treasurer in the Kirner Ministry (1990–1992). Upon the abolition of Brunswick, Roper contested and won the adjacent seat of Coburg at the 1992 election.

In 2002, Brunswick was re-created for a third time, and was won by Carlo Carli, who had succeeded Roper as member for Coburg; Carli represented Brunswick until his retirement at the 2010 state election. City of Yarra mayor Jane Garrett held the seat for Labor despite a high-profile campaign by the Victorian Greens, who received a significant swing in their favour. Garrett retained the seat in 2014 in the face of a similarly strong campaign. Labor won government under Daniel Andrews at the 2014 election, and Garrett was promoted into the new Andrews Ministry as Minister for Consumer Affairs, Gaming and Liquor Regulation and Minister for Emergency Services.

In 2018, Garrett decided to contest the State Legislative Council, leaving the seat open. Greens candidate Tim Read won the election after failing to win in 2014. This was the first time that the party held the seat, with a post election margin of 0.6%. This margin was increased to 13.5% in the 2022 election, making it the safest Greens-held seat at either state or federal level in Australia. Read announced his intention to retire at the 2026 election in January 2026 after being diagnosed with cancer. In September 2026, Read died, leaving the seat vacant until November's election.

== Members for Brunswick ==
First incarnation (1904–1955)
Member	Party	Term
Frank Anstey	Labour	1904–1910
James Jewell	Labor	1910–1949
Peter Randles	Labor	1949–1955
Peter Randles	Labor (A-C)	1955
Second incarnation (1976–1992)
Member	Party	Term
Tom Roper	Labor	1976–1992
Third incarnation (2002–present)
Member	Party	Term
Carlo Carli	Labor	2002–2010
Jane Garrett	Labor	2010–2018
Tim Read	Greens	2018–2026

== Election results ==
2022 Victorian state election: Brunswick
Party	Candidate	Votes	%	±%
Greens	Tim Read	18,959	43.6	+1.2
Labor	Mike Williams	12,392	28.5	−9.4
Liberal	Minh Quan Nguyen	4,723	10.9	+2.6
Victorian Socialists	Nahui Jimenez	3,506	8.1	+8.1
Reason	Shea Evans	1,933	4.4	−0.3
Animal Justice	Rachel Lamarche-Beauchesne	699	1.6	−0.5
Independent	Anthony Helou	551	1.3	+1.3
Family First	Lilian Sabry Shaker	529	1.2	+1.2
Independent	Kenneth Charles Taylor	153	0.4	+0.4
Total formal votes		43,445	96.2	+2.0
Informal votes		1,733	3.8	−2.0
Turnout		45,178	86.4	−0.9
Notional two-party-preferred count
Labor	Mike Williams	36,518	84.1	−0.5
Liberal	Minh Quan Nguyen	6,927	15.9	+0.5
Two-candidate-preferred result
Greens	Tim Read	27,664	63.7	+11.7
Labor	Mike Williams	15,781	36.3	−11.7
Greens hold		Swing	+11.7	

Two-candidate-preferred vote results in Brunswick View source data.
