= Carlo Carli (Australian politician) =

Australian politician (born 1960)

Carlo Domenico Carli (born 6 April 1960) is an Australian politician and the president of association football (soccer) Brunswick Zebras Football Club. He was a Labor Party member of the Victorian Legislative Assembly from 1994 to 2010, representing the electorate of Brunswick.

== Early life ==
Carlo was born in Melbourne in 1960. His parents came to Australia from Italy after WWII. They come from Vicenza, in the old Venetian republic and lived first in Carlton and later in Coburg. Carlo worked alongside his father at General Motors during his student years. After matriculating at Newlands High School, Carlo went on to study politics and languages at University of Melbourne. As well as developing his already keen interest in politics. From 1979 to 1980, he was the Assistant Secretary of the Melbourne University Student Representative Council. Carlo used his university years to convert his knowledge of Venetian dialect to standard Italian, and to learn Spanish. He then completed a Masters thesis for the Masters for Urban Planning on the medium-density housing boom.

== Political career ==
Carli was first elected in May 1994, to the then seat of Coburg. He succeeded long-standing Labor MP Tom Roper who had been the Victorian Treasurer and a senior Minister in the Cain and Kirner governments. He was first elected to the Labor frontbench in 1996. From October to December 1999 he was Parliamentary Secretary for Multicultural Affairs, before moving to Infrastructure under the then state Minister for Transport, Peter Batchelor. After the 2006 State Election he stepped down from the frontbench. On 3 June 2008 he announced his intention to retire from Parliament at the 2010 State Election.

== Personal life ==
His work background includes the trade union movement, local, State and Federal government, including a stint as Ministerial Adviser in Housing in the twilight months of the Kirner government. He is married to Siobhan Hannan and has three children.

== Notes ==
1. Carlo Carli's curriculum vitae
2. Retirement Announcement

Victorian Legislative Assembly
Preceded by Tom Roper	Member for Coburg; 1994–2002	Succeeded by Seat abolished
Preceded by Seat recreated	Member for Brunswick; 2002–2010	Succeeded by Jane Garrett
