= Charlie Mutton =

Australian politician

Member of the Victorian Legislative Assembly for Coburg
- In office 1 July 1940 – 1 March 1967
- Preceded by: Frank Keane
- Succeeded by: Jack Mutton

Leader of the Progressive Labor Party
- In office 9 October 1950 – Late 1955

Councillor of the City of Broadmeadows for Campbellfield Riding
- In office 1925–1953

President of Broadmeadows
- In office 1947–1948
- In office 1934–1935

Personal details
- Born: Charles Mutton; 14 September 1890 North Melbourne, Victoria, Australia
- Died: 13 May 1989 (aged 98) Melbourne, Victoria, Australia
- Party: Labor (1908–1940; 1956–1989)
- Other political affiliations: Blackburn-Mutton Labor (1947–1950); Progressive Labor (1950–1955)

Charles Mutton (14 September 1890 – 13 May 1989) was an Australian politician.

He was born in North Melbourne to tobacco worker Charles Mutton and Mary Ann Moloney. He attended Catholic schools and from 1903 to 1910 worked for Excelsior Barbed Wire and Nail Works. In 1911 he became an ironworker, and in August 1914 he married Annie Maria Peachey, with whom he had four children. In 1908 he had joined the Labor Party, and in 1917 he became founding president of the Fawkner branch. In 1930 he inherited his father's poultry farm, and also became president of the Iron Founders' Union. He was a Broadmeadows Shire councillor from 1925 to 1953, serving twice as president (1934–;35, 1947–48).

In 1940 he was elected to the Victorian Legislative Assembly in a by-election for the seat of Coburg; for running as an Independent Labor candidate, he was expelled from the Labor Party. He and another expelled Labor federal politician Doris Blackburn founded the Blackburn-Mutton Labor Party (BMLP) in 1947, which then became the Progressive Labor Party (Victoria) in 1950. In June 1956 he was re-admitted to the party, and he served until his retirement in 1967, when he was succeeded by his son Jack. Mutton died in Melbourne in 1989.

Victorian Legislative Assembly
Preceded by Frank Keane	Member for Coburg; 1940–1967	Succeeded by Jack Mutton
