= Tom Roper =

Australian politician (1945–2023)

Thomas William Roper (6 March 1945 − 21 June 2023) was an Australian politician.

== Life and career ==
Thomas Roper was born in Chatswood and attended North Sydney Boys High School before graduating with a Bachelor of Arts from Sydney University. From 1967 to 1968 he was National Aboriginal Affairs officer with the National Union of Australian University Students, moving to education vice-president from 1968 to 1970. In 1970 he became a tutor at La Trobe University's education school, before becoming an advisor for the federal Minister for Aboriginal Affairs in 1973. A member of the Labor Party, he was elected to the Victorian Legislative Assembly in 1973 as the member for Brunswick West, moving to Brunswick in 1976.

In 1976, Roper was appointed Shadow Minister for Health, assuming the ministerial role in 1982 and moving to the Transport portfolio in 1985 and to Planning, Environment, Aboriginal and Consumer Affairs in 1987. In 1990 he was appointed Treasurer, serving until 1992. Following Labor's defeat at the 1992 state election, he became Shadow Minister for Health, Sport, Recreation, Racing and Gaming, but he stepped down from that role in 1993 and resigned from the Assembly in 1994. Following his retirement he was a member of the Australian Government Advisory Council on the Environment and Employment Opportunities from 1994 to 1996, a board member of Australian Hearing Services from 1995 to 2001, a board member of the Climate Institute in Washington, D.C. since 1994, and a board member of Greenfleet Australia since 2003.

Roper died on 21 June 2023, at the age of 78.

== Writing ==
In 1971, his book The Myth of Equality was published. Its subject was "the gross disadvantages experienced by large numbers of students in both the public and private sector".

Victorian Legislative Assembly
Preceded by Campbell Turnbull	Member for Brunswick West; 1973–1976	Abolished
New seat	Member for Brunswick; 1976–1992	Abolished
Preceded by Peter Gavin	Member for Coburg; 1992–1994	Succeeded by Carlo Carli
