= 1947 Victorian state election =

Australian state election

- 8 November 1947

All 65 seats in the Victorian Legislative Assembly 33 seats needed for a majority
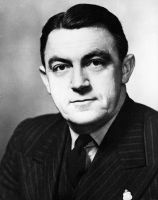

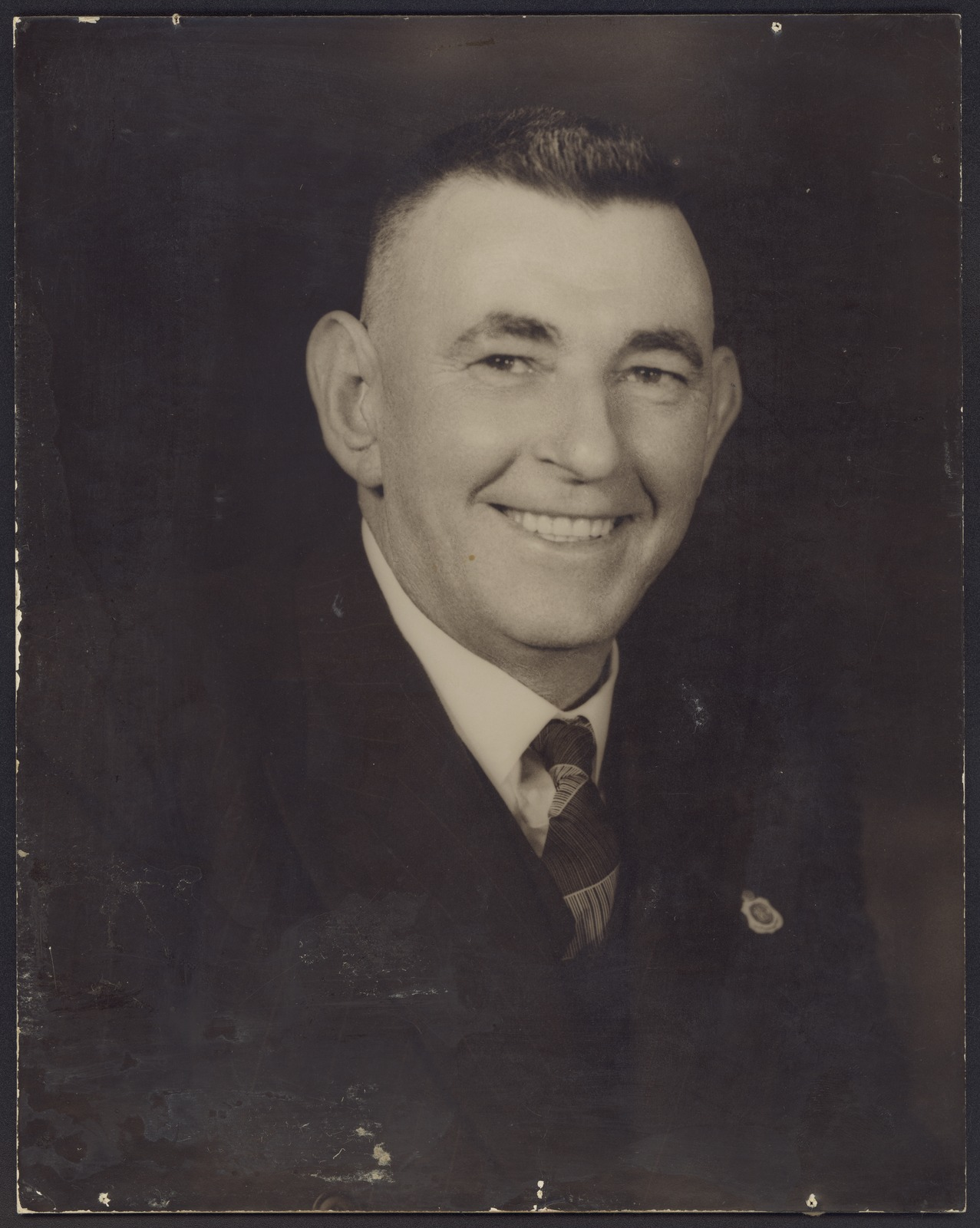

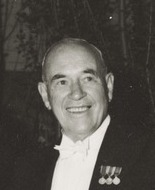
	First party	Second party	Third party
Leader	Thomas Hollway	John McDonald	John Cain
Party	Liberal	Country	Labor
Leader since	3 December 1940	22 November 1945	18 October 1937
Leader's seat	Ballarat	Shepparton	Northcote
Last election	10 seats	18 seats	31 seats
Seats won	27 seats	20 seats	17 seats
Seat change	▲17	▲2	▼14
Percentage	37.16%	14.92%	40.87%
Swing	▲16.65	▼4.05	▼0.15
- Results in each electorate.
Premier before election
John Cain
Labor
Elected Premier
Thomas Hollway
Liberal

The 1947 Victorian state election was held in the Australian state of Victoria on Saturday 8 November 1947 to elect 65 members of the state's Legislative Assembly. The election resulted in a landslide defeat for the Labor government of John Cain, which lost 14 seats and was reduced to 17, its lowest number since 1932. The opposition Liberal Party and Country Party won a combined total of 47 seats, with the Liberals alone capturing 27—a gain of 17—to become the largest party in the Assembly for the first time since the party's formation.

The campaign was dominated by federal issues, particularly the Chifley government's proposal to nationalise private banks. Opposition parties campaigned heavily against bank nationalisation, framing the state election as a referendum on the policy. Liberal leader Thomas Hollway, who became premier following the election, declared the result "the beginning of the fight against the Commonwealth Government" and pledged that the new government would "fight to the end to defeat Mr. Chifley's Bank Nationalisation programme." Country Party leader John McDonald interpreted the outcome as confirmation that "socialism is out for good in Victoria."

Three Labor ministers—Deputy Premier Frank Field, Minister of Mines William McKenzie, and Chief Secretary Bill Slater—lost their seats. Labor officials blamed attacks by federal and state Labor figures on former prisoners of war Adair Blain and Wilfrid Kent Hughes, both of whom stood as Liberal candidates, for contributing to the scale of the defeat. The election marked the end of Labor's brief minority government, which had relied on the support of two independents since the 1945 election. Both independents were among the earliest casualties on election night. Future premier Henry Bolte was first elected to Parliament at this election.

== Background ==
In late 1947, the minority Labor government of Premier John Cain was under intense pressure from the combined opposition parties. The Liberal Party, which held a majority in the Victorian Legislative Council, rejected the government's Supply Bill, depriving the administration of the authority to disburse funds after its existing spending approval expired. The tactic was intended to force a political crisis and bring about an early election. However, the Cain government had delayed presenting the Supply Bill until the last possible moment, meaning that thousands of public servants would go unpaid as a direct result of the Council's rejection.

The Opposition's hope of framing the ensuing election primarily as a referendum on the federal Chifley government's proposed bank nationalisation was also considered politically risky, with observers questioning whether many electors would change their state vote to express disapproval of a federal policy. Prime Minister Ben Chifley was expected to continue his pursuit of bank nationalisation regardless of any state election result.

== Results ==
=== Legislative Assembly ===
Victorian state election, 8 November 1947 Legislative Assembly << 1945–1950 >>
Enrolled voters	1,291,515				
Votes cast	1,206,815		Turnout	93.44	+5.46
Informal votes	16,102		Informal	1.33	−0.75
Summary of votes by party
Party	Primary votes	%	Swing	Seats	Change
Labor	486,635	40.87	−0.15	17	−14
Liberal	442,451	37.16	+16.65	27	+17
Country	177,698	14.92	−4.05	20	+2
Communist	1,575	0.13	−2.73	0	±0
Independent	82,354	6.92	−3.57	1	−2
Total	1,190,713			65	

== See also ==
- Candidates of the 1947 Victorian state election
- 1946 Victorian Legislative Council election
