= Electoral district of Coburg =

Former state electoral district of Victoria, Australia

Coordinates: 37°45′S 144°58′E

Coburg Victoria—Legislative Assembly
- State: Victoria
- Created: 1927
- Abolished: 2002
- Namesake: Coburg, Victoria
- Demographic: Metropolitan

Electoral district of Coburg was an electoral district of the Legislative Assembly in the Australian state of Victoria.

== Members for Coburg ==
Member	Party	Term
Frank Keane	Labor	1927–1940
Charlie Mutton	Independent Labor	1940–1947
Charlie Mutton	Blackburn-Mutton Labor	1947–1950
Charlie Mutton	Progressive Labor	1950–1955
Charlie Mutton	Labor	1956–1967
Jack Mutton	Independent	1967–1979
Peter Gavin	Labor	1979–1992
Tom Roper	Labor	1992–1994
Carlo Carli	Labor	1994–2002
