= Electoral results for the district of Essendon =

Victoria, Australia, district election results

This is a list of electoral results for the Electoral district of Essendon in Victorian state elections.

== Members for Essendon ==
| Member | Party | Term |
|---|---|---|
| William Watt | Liberal | 1904–1914 |
| Maurice Blackburn | Labor | 1914–1917 |
| Thomas Ryan | Nationalist | 1917–1924 |
| Frank Keane | Labor | 1924–1927 |
| Arthur Drakeford | Labor | 1927–1932 |
| James Dillon | United Australia | 1932–1943 |
| Samuel Merrifield | Labor | 1943–1945 |
| Arthur Drakeford Jr | Labor | 1945–1947 |
| Allen Bateman | Liberal | 1947–1950 |
| George Fewster | Labor | 1950–1955 |
| George Fewster | Labor (Anti-Communist) | 1955 |
| Sir Kenneth Wheeler | Liberal | 1958–1979 |
| Barry Rowe | Labor | 1979–1992 |
| Ian Davis | Liberal | 1992–1996 |
| Judy Maddigan | Labor | 1996–2010 |
| Justin Madden | Labor | 2010–2014 |
| Danny Pearson | Labor | 2014–present |

== Election results ==
=== Elections in the 2020s ===
2022 Victorian state election: Essendon
| Party | Candidate | Votes | % | ±% |
|---|---|---|---|---|
| Labor | Danny Pearson | 17,196 | 41.1 | −5.1 |
| Liberal | Angelo Baronessa | 12,331 | 29.5 | +1.9 |
| Greens | Jared Prentis | 6,344 | 15.1 | −1.7 |
| Victorian Socialists | Daniel Nair Dadich | 1,951 | 4.7 | +4.7 |
| Animal Justice | Gayle Williams | 1,173 | 2.8 | +2.8 |
| Reason | Nicholas Hope | 1,018 | 2.4 | +2.4 |
| Freedom | David Wright | 1,006 | 2.4 | +2.4 |
| Family First | Margaret Muir | 848 | 2.0 | +2.0 |
| Total formal votes | | 41,867 | 96.0 | +1.5 |
| Informal votes | | 1,761 | 4.0 | −1.5 |
| Turnout | | 43,628 | 88.1 | |
Two-party-preferred result
| Labor | Danny Pearson | 26,146 | 62.5 | −3.4 |
| Liberal | Angelo Baronessa | 15,721 | 37.5 | +3.4 |
| Labor hold | | Swing | −3.4 | |

=== Elections in the 2010s ===
2018 Victorian state election: Essendon
| Party | Candidate | Votes | % | ±% |
|---|---|---|---|---|
| Labor | Danny Pearson | 19,173 | 46.23 | +5.33 |
| Liberal | Gino Potenza | 11,414 | 27.52 | −8.34 |
| Greens | James Williams | 6,971 | 16.81 | −1.22 |
| Independent | Richard Lawrence | 1,702 | 4.10 | +0.72 |
| Independent | Kate Baker | 1,356 | 3.27 | +3.27 |
| Democratic Labour | Dermot Connors | 856 | 2.06 | +2.06 |
| Total formal votes | | 41,472 | 95.25 | −0.81 |
| Informal votes | | 2,067 | 4.75 | +0.81 |
| Turnout | | 43,539 | 89.91 | −2.52 |
Two-party-preferred result
| Labor | Danny Pearson | 27,315 | 65.86 | +7.20 |
| Liberal | Gino Potenza | 14,157 | 34.14 | −7.20 |
| Labor hold | | Swing | +7.20 | |

2014 Victorian state election: Essendon
| Party | Candidate | Votes | % | ±% |
|---|---|---|---|---|
| Labor | Danny Pearson | 16,026 | 40.9 | +2.8 |
| Liberal | Fred Ackerman | 14,052 | 35.9 | +1.1 |
| Greens | Ashley Waite | 7,065 | 18.0 | +0.1 |
| Independent | Richard Lawrence | 1,326 | 3.4 | +3.4 |
| Voice for the West | Mario Mendez | 714 | 1.8 | +1.8 |
| Total formal votes | | 39,183 | 96.1 | +0.1 |
| Informal votes | | 1,605 | 3.9 | −0.1 |
| Turnout | | 40,788 | 92.4 | +2.7 |
Two-party-preferred result
| Labor | Danny Pearson | 22,988 | 58.7 | +4.3 |
| Liberal | Fred Ackerman | 16,195 | 41.3 | −4.3 |
| Labor hold | | Swing | +4.3 | |

2010 Victorian state election: Essendon
| Party | Candidate | Votes | % | ±% |
|---|---|---|---|---|
| Liberal | Rebecca Gauci | 12,983 | 36.83 | +3.53 |
| Labor | Justin Madden | 12,867 | 36.50 | −13.37 |
| Greens | Rose Iser | 5,816 | 16.50 | +4.34 |
| Independent | Paul Giuliano | 2,540 | 7.21 | +7.21 |
| Democratic Labor | Sarah Notaro | 1,047 | 2.97 | +2.97 |
| Total formal votes | | 35,253 | 95.97 | +0.72 |
| Informal votes | | 1,480 | 4.03 | −0.72 |
| Turnout | | 36,733 | 92.17 | +0.44 |
Two-party-preferred result
| Labor | Justin Madden | 18,224 | 51.66 | −10.04 |
| Liberal | Rebecca Gauci | 17,051 | 48.34 | +10.04 |
| Labor hold | | Swing | −10.04 | |

=== Elections in the 2000s ===
2006 Victorian state election: Essendon
| Party | Candidate | Votes | % | ±% |
|---|---|---|---|---|
| Labor | Judy Maddigan | 16,383 | 49.87 | −4.67 |
| Liberal | Conrad D'Souza | 10,939 | 33.30 | +1.84 |
| Greens | Bob Muntz | 3,995 | 12.16 | −0.29 |
| Family First | Arthur Tsiglopoulos | 997 | 3.03 | +3.03 |
| Independent | Philip Cutler | 414 | 1.26 | +1.26 |
| Citizens Electoral Council | Jeremy Beck | 125 | 0.38 | −1.17 |
| Total formal votes | | 32,853 | 95.25 | −1.62 |
| Informal votes | | 1,639 | 4.75 | +1.62 |
| Turnout | | 34,492 | 91.73 | −0.73 |
Two-party-preferred result
| Labor | Judy Maddigan | 20,276 | 61.70 | −4.22 |
| Liberal | Conrad D'Souza | 12,586 | 38.30 | +4.22 |
| Labor hold | | Swing | −4.22 | |

2002 Victorian state election: Essendon
| Party | Candidate | Votes | % | ±% |
|---|---|---|---|---|
| Labor | Judy Maddigan | 18,255 | 54.5 | −3.6 |
| Liberal | Steve Reynolds | 10,531 | 31.5 | −10.4 |
| Greens | Victor Lewis-Hansom | 4,167 | 12.4 | +12.4 |
| Citizens Electoral Council | Colin Horne | 519 | 1.6 | +1.6 |
| Total formal votes | | 33,472 | 96.9 | −0.6 |
| Informal votes | | 1,081 | 3.1 | +0.6 |
| Turnout | | 34,553 | 92.5 | |
Two-party-preferred result
| Labor | Judy Maddigan | 22,065 | 65.9 | +7.8 |
| Liberal | Steve Reynolds | 11,405 | 34.1 | −7.8 |
| Labor hold | | Swing | +7.8 | |

=== Elections in the 1990s ===
1999 Victorian state election: Essendon
| Party | Candidate | Votes | % | ±% |
|---|---|---|---|---|
| Labor | Judy Maddigan | 18,489 | 58.5 | +5.1 |
| Liberal | Ken Saunders | 13,135 | 41.5 | −5.1 |
| Total formal votes | | 31,624 | 97.4 | −0.3 |
| Informal votes | | 839 | 2.6 | +0.3 |
| Turnout | | 32,463 | 93.7 | |
| Labor hold | | Swing | +5.1 | |

1996 Victorian state election: Essendon
| Party | Candidate | Votes | % | ±% |
|---|---|---|---|---|
| Labor | Judy Maddigan | 15,652 | 50.9 | +6.9 |
| Liberal | Ian Davis | 13,282 | 43.2 | +0.2 |
| Independent | Joan Brodie | 978 | 3.2 | +3.2 |
| Independent | Geoff Lutz | 291 | 0.9 | +0.9 |
| Independent | Simone Green | 288 | 0.9 | +0.9 |
| Natural Law | Jamie Pollock | 263 | 0.9 | −1.3 |
| Total formal votes | | 30,754 | 97.7 | +1.4 |
| Informal votes | | 727 | 2.3 | −1.4 |
| Turnout | | 31,481 | 93.3 | |
Two-party-preferred result
| Labor | Judy Maddigan | 16,404 | 53.4 | +4.6 |
| Liberal | Ian Davis | 14,324 | 46.6 | −4.6 |
| Labor gain from Liberal | | Swing | +4.6 | |

1992 Victorian state election: Essendon
| Party | Candidate | Votes | % | ±% |
|---|---|---|---|---|
| Labor | Judy Maddigan | 13,046 | 44.0 | −10.0 |
| Liberal | Ian Davis | 12,757 | 43.0 | +1.0 |
| Independent | Rowena Allsop | 2,341 | 7.9 | +7.9 |
| Independent | Geoff Ireland | 875 | 3.0 | +3.0 |
| Natural Law | John Bell | 628 | 2.1 | +2.1 |
| Total formal votes | | 29,647 | 96.3 | +0.7 |
| Informal votes | | 1,145 | 3.7 | −0.7 |
| Turnout | | 30,792 | 93.8 | |
Two-party-preferred result
| Liberal | Ian Davis | 15,159 | 51.2 | +6.7 |
| Labor | Judy Maddigan | 14,429 | 48.8 | −6.7 |
| Liberal gain from Labor | | Swing | +6.7 | |

=== Elections in the 1980s ===
1988 Victorian state election: Essendon
| Party | Candidate | Votes | % | ±% |
|---|---|---|---|---|
| Labor | Barry Rowe | 13,862 | 55.55 | −6.53 |
| Liberal | Thomas Hilbert | 10,404 | 41.70 | +3.78 |
| Call to Australia | Karl Benden | 686 | 2.75 | +2.75 |
| Total formal votes | | 24,952 | 95.43 | −1.26 |
| Informal votes | | 1,194 | 4.57 | +1.26 |
| Turnout | | 26,146 | 89.57 | −2.21 |
Two-party-preferred result
| Labor | Barry Rowe | 14,156 | 56.74 | −5.34 |
| Liberal | Thomas Hilbert | 10,404 | 43.26 | +5.34 |
| Labor hold | | Swing | −5.34 | |

1985 Victorian state election: Essendon
| Party | Candidate | Votes | % | ±% |
|---|---|---|---|---|
| Labor | Barry Rowe | 16,964 | 62.1 | −1.8 |
| Liberal | Brian Dodgson | 10,360 | 37.9 | +3.7 |
| Total formal votes | | 27,324 | 96.7 | |
| Informal votes | | 935 | 3.3 | |
| Turnout | | 28,259 | 91.8 | |
| Labor hold | | Swing | −2.9 | |

1982 Victorian state election: Essendon
| Party | Candidate | Votes | % | ±% |
|---|---|---|---|---|
| Labor | Barry Rowe | 14,396 | 57.3 | +6.5 |
| Liberal | Graeme Goodson | 9,770 | 38.9 | −2.5 |
| Democrats | Alan Powell | 780 | 3.1 | +3.1 |
| Australia | Richard Wright | 176 | 0.7 | +0.7 |
| Total formal votes | | 25,122 | 97.2 | −0.1 |
| Informal votes | | 719 | 2.8 | +0.1 |
| Turnout | | 25,841 | 95.1 | +0.7 |
Two-party-preferred result
| Labor | Barry Rowe | 14,932 | 59.4 | +7.9 |
| Liberal | Graeme Goodson | 10,190 | 40.6 | −7.9 |
| Labor hold | | Swing | +7.9 | |

=== Elections in the 1970s ===
1979 Victorian state election: Essendon
| Party | Candidate | Votes | % | ±% |
|---|---|---|---|---|
| Labor | Barry Rowe | 12,864 | 50.8 | +0.8 |
| Liberal | Ian Hocking | 10,487 | 41.4 | −8.6 |
| Democratic Labor | Richard McManus | 1,993 | 7.9 | +7.9 |
| Total formal votes | | 25,344 | 97.3 | +0.1 |
| Informal votes | | 702 | 2.7 | −0.1 |
| Turnout | | 26,046 | 94.4 | +0.5 |
Two-party-preferred result
| Labor | Barry Rowe | 13,045 | 51.5 | +1.6 |
| Liberal | Ian Hocking | 12,299 | 48.5 | −1.6 |
| Labor gain from Liberal | | Swing | +1.6 | |

1976 Victorian state election: Essendon
| Party | Candidate | Votes | % | ±% |
|---|---|---|---|---|
| Liberal | Kenneth Wheeler | 13,197 | 50.05 | +8.1 |
| Labor | Barry Rowe | 13,173 | 49.95 | +5.7 |
| Total formal votes | | 26,370 | 97.2 | |
| Informal votes | | 748 | 2.8 | |
| Turnout | | 27,118 | 93.9 | |
| Liberal hold | | Swing | −2.8 | |

1973 Victorian state election: Essendon
| Party | Candidate | Votes | % | ±% |
|---|---|---|---|---|
| Labor | Ronald Kennelly | 11,514 | 42.7 | −3.0 |
| Liberal | Kenneth Wheeler | 11,232 | 41.6 | +4.2 |
| Democratic Labor | John Moloney | 2,483 | 9.2 | −7.6 |
| Australia | Stanley Bell | 1,205 | 4.5 | +4.5 |
| Defence of Government Schools | Lancelot Hutchinson | 555 | 2.1 | +2.1 |
| Total formal votes | | 26,989 | 96.0 | −0.8 |
| Informal votes | | 1,113 | 4.0 | +0.8 |
| Turnout | | 28,102 | 95.1 | −0.3 |
Two-party-preferred result
| Liberal | Kenneth Wheeler | 14,377 | 53.3 | +2.6 |
| Labor | Ronald Kennelly | 12,612 | 46.7 | −2.6 |
| Liberal hold | | Swing | +2.6 | |

1970 Victorian state election: Essendon
| Party | Candidate | Votes | % | ±% |
|---|---|---|---|---|
| Labor | Ronald Kennelly | 11,137 | 45.7 | +4.5 |
| Liberal | Kenneth Wheeler | 9,125 | 37.4 | −2.1 |
| Democratic Labor | Kevin Digby | 4,103 | 16.8 | −1.7 |
| Total formal votes | | 24,365 | 96.8 | −1.4 |
| Informal votes | | 815 | 3.2 | +1.4 |
| Turnout | | 25,180 | 95.4 | −1.2 |
Two-party-preferred result
| Liberal | Kenneth Wheeler | 12,342 | 50.7 | −4.7 |
| Labor | Ronald Kennelly | 12,023 | 49.3 | +4.7 |
| Liberal hold | | Swing | −4.7 | |

=== Elections in the 1960s ===
1967 Victorian state election: Essendon
| Party | Candidate | Votes | % | ±% |
|---|---|---|---|---|
| Labor | Arthur Sanger | 9,624 | 41.2 | −1.2 |
| Liberal | Kenneth Wheeler | 9,216 | 39.5 | +1.1 |
| Democratic Labor | Kevin Digby | 4,315 | 18.5 | −0.8 |
| Independent | Francis Zajac | 181 | 0.8 | +0.8 |
| Total formal votes | | 23,986 | 98.2 | |
| Informal votes | | 181 | 1.8 | |
| Turnout | | 24,167 | 96.6 | |
Two-party-preferred result
| Liberal | Kenneth Wheeler | 12,929 | 55.4 | +0.5 |
| Labor | Arthur Sanger | 10,407 | 44.6 | −0.5 |
| Liberal hold | | Swing | +0.5 | |

1964 Victorian state election: Essendon
| Party | Candidate | Votes | % | ±% |
|---|---|---|---|---|
| Liberal and Country | Kenneth Wheeler | 9,893 | 41.9 | +2.0 |
| Labor | Richard Kirby | 9,234 | 39.1 | +0.4 |
| Democratic Labor | Kevin Digby | 4,504 | 19.1 | −1.0 |
| Total formal votes | | 23,631 | 98.0 | +0.6 |
| Informal votes | | 485 | 2.0 | −0.6 |
| Turnout | | 24,116 | 94.9 | −0.5 |
Two-party-preferred result
| Liberal and Country | Kenneth Wheeler | 13,459 | 57.0 | 0.0 |
| Labor | Richard Kirby | 10,172 | 43.0 | 0.0 |
| Liberal and Country hold | | Swing | 0.0 | |

1961 Victorian state election: Essendon
| Party | Candidate | Votes | % | ±% |
|---|---|---|---|---|
| Liberal and Country | Kenneth Wheeler | 9,054 | 39.9 | +1.8 |
| Labor | Leslie Edmunds | 8,794 | 38.7 | −6.2 |
| Democratic Labor | Kevin Digby | 4,564 | 20.1 | +3.0 |
| Independent | Norman McClure | 294 | 1.3 | +1.3 |
| Total formal votes | | 22,706 | 97.4 | −1.0 |
| Informal votes | | 614 | 2.6 | +1.0 |
| Turnout | | 23,320 | 95.4 | −0.3 |
Two-party-preferred result
| Liberal and Country | Kenneth Wheeler | 12,933 | 57.0 | +5.5 |
| Labor | Leslie Edmunds | 9,773 | 43.0 | −5.5 |
| Liberal and Country hold | | Swing | +5.5 | |

=== Elections in the 1950s ===
1958 Victorian state election: Essendon
| Party | Candidate | Votes | % | ±% |
|---|---|---|---|---|
| Labor | Arthur Drakeford | 9,737 | 44.9 | |
| Liberal and Country | Kenneth Wheeler | 8,270 | 38.1 | |
| Democratic Labor | Kevin Digby | 3,702 | 17.1 | |
| Total formal votes | | 21,709 | 98.4 | |
| Informal votes | | 343 | 1.6 | |
| Turnout | | 22,052 | 95.7 | |
Two-party-preferred result
| Liberal and Country | Kenneth Wheeler | 11,181 | 51.5 | |
| Labor | Arthur Drakeford | 10,528 | 48.5 | |
| Liberal and Country gain from Labor | | Swing | | |

1952 Victorian state election: Essendon
| Party | Candidate | Votes | % | ±% |
|---|---|---|---|---|
| Labor | George Fewster | 19,808 | 64.2 | +15.1 |
| Liberal and Country | Kenneth Wheeler | 8,279 | 26.8 | −19.4 |
| Independent | Lancelot Hutchinson | 2,765 | 9.0 | +9.0 |
| Total formal votes | | 30,852 | 98.4 | −0.6 |
| Informal votes | | 485 | 1.6 | +0.6 |
| Turnout | | 31,337 | 94.4 | −0.9 |
Two-party-preferred result
| Labor | George Fewster | 20,085 | 65.1 | +13.8 |
| Liberal and Country | Kenneth Wheeler | 10,767 | 34.9 | −13.8 |
| Labor hold | | Swing | +13.8 | |

1950 Victorian state election: Essendon
| Party | Candidate | Votes | % | ±% |
|---|---|---|---|---|
| Labor | George Fewster | 13,725 | 49.1 | −0.3 |
| Liberal and Country | Allen Bateman | 12,910 | 46.2 | −4.4 |
| Independent | Arthur Dodds | 1,319 | 4.7 | +4.7 |
| Total formal votes | | 27,954 | 99.0 | +0.1 |
| Informal votes | | 287 | 1.0 | −0.1 |
| Turnout | | 28,241 | 95.3 | +0.5 |
Two-party-preferred result
| Labor | George Fewster | 14,339 | 51.3 | +1.9 |
| Liberal and Country | Allen Bateman | 13,615 | 48.7 | −1.9 |
| Labor gain from Liberal and Country | | Swing | +1.9 | |

=== Elections in the 1940s ===
1947 Victorian state election: Essendon
| Party | Candidate | Votes | % | ±% |
|---|---|---|---|---|
| Liberal | Allen Bateman | 12,776 | 50.6 | +14.0 |
| Labor | Arthur Drakeford | 12,464 | 49.4 | −14.0 |
| Total formal votes | | 25,240 | 98.9 | +0.9 |
| Informal votes | | 288 | 1.1 | −0.9 |
| Turnout | | 25,528 | 94.8 | +5.1 |
| Liberal gain from Labor | | Swing | +14.0 | |

1945 Victorian state election: Essendon
| Party | Candidate | Votes | % | ±% |
|---|---|---|---|---|
| Labor | Arthur Drakeford Jr. | 14,007 | 63.4 | |
| Liberal | James Dillon | 8,073 | 36.6 | |
| Total formal votes | | 22,080 | 98.0 | |
| Informal votes | | 442 | 2.0 | |
| Turnout | | 22,522 | 89.7 | |
| Labor hold | | Swing | | |

1943 Victorian state election: Essendon
| Party | Candidate | Votes | % | ±% |
|---|---|---|---|---|
| Labor | Samuel Merrifield | 12,294 | 45.6 | −2.8 |
| United Australia | James Dillon | 11,370 | 42.2 | −9.4 |
| Independent | Arthur Dodds | 3,296 | 12.2 | +12.2 |
| Total formal votes | | 26,960 | 97.8 | −1.2 |
| Informal votes | | 591 | 2.2 | +1.2 |
| Turnout | | 27,551 | 89.2 | −6.2 |
Two-party-preferred result
| Labor | Samuel Merrifield | 14,239 | 52.8 | +4.4 |
| United Australia | James Dillon | 12,721 | 47.2 | −4.4 |
| Labor gain from United Australia | | Swing | +4.4 | |

1940 Victorian state election: Essendon
| Party | Candidate | Votes | % | ±% |
|---|---|---|---|---|
| United Australia | James Dillon | 12,931 | 51.6 | −3.1 |
| Labor | Arthur Clarey | 12,149 | 48.4 | +3.1 |
| Total formal votes | | 25,080 | 99.0 | +0.1 |
| Informal votes | | 261 | 1.0 | −0.1 |
| Turnout | | 25,341 | 95.4 | −1.3 |
| United Australia hold | | Swing | −3.1 | |

=== Elections in the 1930s ===
1937 Victorian state election: Essendon
| Party | Candidate | Votes | % | ±% |
|---|---|---|---|---|
| United Australia | James Dillon | 12,999 | 54.7 | +2.9 |
| Labor | Arthur Clarey | 10,752 | 45.3 | −2.9 |
| Total formal votes | | 23,751 | 98.9 | −0.3 |
| Informal votes | | 262 | 1.1 | +0.3 |
| Turnout | | 24,013 | 96.7 | +0.3 |
| United Australia hold | | Swing | +2.9 | |

1935 Victorian state election: Essendon
| Party | Candidate | Votes | % | ±% |
|---|---|---|---|---|
| United Australia | James Dillon | 11,746 | 51.8 | −1.1 |
| Labor | Alan Bird | 10,921 | 48.2 | +1.1 |
| Total formal votes | | 22,667 | 99.2 | +0.1 |
| Informal votes | | 193 | 0.8 | −0.1 |
| Turnout | | 22,860 | 96.4 | 0.0 |
| United Australia hold | | Swing | −1.1 | |

1932 Victorian state election: Essendon
| Party | Candidate | Votes | % | ±% |
|---|---|---|---|---|
| United Australia | James Dillon | 11,572 | 52.9 | +26.8 |
| Labor | Arthur Drakeford | 10,300 | 47.1 | −10.4 |
| Total formal votes | | 21,872 | 99.1 | +0.8 |
| Informal votes | | 206 | 0.9 | −0.8 |
| Turnout | | 22,078 | 96.4 | +0.3 |
| United Australia gain from Labor | | Swing | +12.0 | |

=== Elections in the 1920s ===
1929 Victorian state election: Essendon
| Party | Candidate | Votes | % | ±% |
|---|---|---|---|---|
| Labor | Arthur Drakeford | 12,119 | 57.5 | +5.1 |
| Nationalist | Arthur Clerke | 5,506 | 26.1 | −21.5 |
| Ind. Nationalist | Arthur Fenton | 2,680 | 12.7 | +12.7 |
| Ind. Nationalist | Gerald Fitzgerald | 775 | 3.7 | +3.7 |
| Total formal votes | | 21,080 | 98.3 | −1.0 |
| Informal votes | | 368 | 1.7 | +1.0 |
| Turnout | | 21,448 | 96.1 | +1.3 |
Two-party-preferred result
| Labor | Arthur Drakeford | | 59.1 | +6.7 |
| Nationalist | Arthur Clerke | | 40.9 | −6.7 |
| Labor hold | | Swing | +6.7 | |

- Two party preferred vote was estimated.

1927 Victorian state election: Essendon
| Party | Candidate | Votes | % | ±% |
|---|---|---|---|---|
| Labor | Arthur Drakeford | 10,196 | 52.4 | |
| Nationalist | Robert Gilbertson | 9,254 | 47.6 | |
| Total formal votes | | 19,450 | 99.3 | |
| Informal votes | | 144 | 0.7 | |
| Turnout | | 19,594 | 94.8 | |
| Labor hold | | Swing | | |

1924 Victorian state election: Essendon
| Party | Candidate | Votes | % | ±% |
|---|---|---|---|---|
| Labor | Frank Keane | 12,375 | 55.0 | +10.9 |
| Nationalist | Thomas Ryan | 10,106 | 45.0 | −10.9 |
| Total formal votes | | 22,481 | 99.6 | −0.1 |
| Informal votes | | 96 | 0.4 | +0.1 |
| Turnout | | 22,577 | 61.0 | +2.9 |
| Labor gain from Nationalist | | Swing | +10.9 | |

1921 Victorian state election: Essendon
| Party | Candidate | Votes | % | ±% |
|---|---|---|---|---|
| Nationalist | Thomas Ryan | 10,254 | 55.9 | −1.4 |
| Labor | Alexander Taylor | 8,093 | 44.1 | +1.4 |
| Total formal votes | | 18,347 | 99.7 | +0.7 |
| Informal votes | | 58 | 0.3 | −0.7 |
| Turnout | | 18,405 | 58.1 | −7.2 |
| Nationalist hold | | Swing | −1.4 | |

1920 Victorian state election: Essendon
| Party | Candidate | Votes | % | ±% |
|---|---|---|---|---|
| Nationalist | Thomas Ryan | 11,607 | 57.3 | +2.2 |
| Labor | Joseph Murphy | 8,661 | 42.7 | −2.2 |
| Total formal votes | | 20,268 | 99.0 | +1.7 |
| Informal votes | | 210 | 1.0 | −1.7 |
| Turnout | | 20,478 | 65.3 | +2.1 |
| Nationalist hold | | Swing | +2.2 | |

=== Elections in the 1910s ===
1917 Victorian state election: Essendon
| Party | Candidate | Votes | % | ±% |
|---|---|---|---|---|
| Nationalist | Thomas Ryan | 9,551 | 55.1 | +7.5 |
| Labor | Maurice Blackburn | 7,782 | 44.9 | −7.5 |
| Total formal votes | | 17,333 | 97.3 | −1.3 |
| Informal votes | | 473 | 2.7 | +1.3 |
| Turnout | | 17,806 | 63.2 | +7.1 |
| Nationalist gain from Labor | | Swing | +7.5 | |

1914 Victorian state election: Essendon
| Party | Candidate | Votes | % | ±% |
|---|---|---|---|---|
| Labor | Maurice Blackburn | 7,342 | 52.4 | +11.3 |
| Liberal | Edward Reynolds | 6,660 | 47.6 | −11.3 |
| Total formal votes | | 14,002 | 98.6 | −0.4 |
| Informal votes | | 195 | 1.4 | +0.4 |
| Turnout | | 14,197 | 56.1 | −10.1 |
| Labor gain from Liberal | | Swing | +11.3 | |

1911 Victorian state election: Essendon
| Party | Candidate | Votes | % | ±% |
|---|---|---|---|---|
| Liberal | William Watt | 7,134 | 58.9 | +13.5 |
| Labor | Frank Keane | 4,987 | 41.1 | +0.1 |
| Total formal votes | | 12,121 | 99.0 | −0.6 |
| Informal votes | | 125 | 1.0 | +0.6 |
| Turnout | | 12,246 | 66.2 | +14.0 |
| Liberal hold | | Swing | N/A | |
