= Results of the 1992 Victorian state election (Legislative Assembly) =

Australian state election results

Victorian state election, 3 October 1992 Legislative Assembly << 1988–1996 >>
Enrolled voters	2,855,471				
Votes cast	2,716,298		Turnout	95.13	+2.78
Informal votes	103,401		Informal	3.81	–0.08
Summary of votes by party
Party	Primary votes	%	Swing	Seats	Change
Liberal	1,153,770	44.16	+3.59	52	+19
Labor	1,003,495	38.41	–8.14	27	–19
National	204,525	7.83	+0.06	9	± 0
Natural Law	34,616	1.32	+1.32	0	± 0
Geelong Community	12,247	0.47	+0.47	0	± 0
Democrats	5,080	0.19	–0.86	0	± 0
Pensioner and CIR	3,844	0.15	+0.15	0	± 0
Greens	1,863	0.07	+0.07	0	± 0
Call to Australia	1,143	0.04	–1.01	0	± 0
Independent	192,314	7.36	+4.58	0	± 0
Total	2,612,897			88	
Two-party-preferred
Liberal/National	1,467,990	56.30	+5.78		
Labor	1,139,635	43.70	–5.78		

This is a list of electoral district results for the 1992 Victorian state election.

== Results by electoral district ==
=== Albert Park ===
1992 Victorian state election: Albert Park
Party	Candidate	Votes	%	±%
Labor	John Thwaites	13,764	46.3	−6.5
Liberal	Wendy Smith	11,702	39.4	+6.9
Independent	Shane Tonks	1,505	5.1	+5.1
Independent	Anne Fahey	1,358	4.6	−4.4
Independent	Jill Rothwell	772	2.6	+2.6
Natural Law	Caroline Hockley	602	2.0	+2.0
Total formal votes		29,703	95.8	+0.4
Informal votes		1,293	4.2	−0.4
Turnout		30,996	91.7	
Two-party-preferred result
Labor	John Thwaites	16,539	55.8	−4.6
Liberal	Wendy Smith	13,098	44.2	+4.6
Labor hold		Swing	−4.6	

=== Altona ===
1992 Victorian state election: Altona
Party	Candidate	Votes	%	±%
Labor	Carole Marple	14,651	52.9	−8.0
Liberal	Timothy Warner	9,268	33.5	+2.2
Independent	Peter Haberecht	2,196	7.9	+7.9
Natural Law	Leon Staropoli	1,564	5.7	+5.7
Total formal votes		27,679	95.4	+1.1
Informal votes		1,334	4.6	−1.1
Turnout		29,013	95.9	
Two-party-preferred result
Labor	Carole Marple	16,810	60.9	−3.9
Liberal	Timothy Warner	10,807	39.1	+3.9
Labor hold		Swing	−3.9	

=== Ballarat East ===
1992 Victorian state election: Ballarat East
Party	Candidate	Votes	%	±%
Liberal	Barry Traynor	14,133	50.1	+5.9
Labor	Frank Sheehan	12,818	45.5	−0.5
Independent	Petra Krjutschkow	1,242	4.4	+4.4
Total formal votes		28,193	97.5	+0.0
Informal votes		716	2.5	−0.0
Turnout		28,909	95.8	
Two-party-preferred result
Liberal	Barry Traynor	14,529	51.6	+1.1
Labor	Frank Sheehan	13,654	48.4	−1.1
Liberal hold		Swing	+1.1	

=== Ballarat West ===
1992 Victorian state election: Ballarat West
Party	Candidate	Votes	%	±%
Liberal	Paul Jenkins	14,091	48.8	+2.9
Labor	Karen Overington	12,204	42.3	−3.4
Independent	Joan Chambers	1,456	5.0	+5.0
Independent	David White	721	2.5	+2.5
Independent	Noel Vodden	410	1.4	+1.4
Total formal votes		28,882	97.2	−0.9
Informal votes		833	2.8	+0.9
Turnout		29,715	96.6	
Two-party-preferred result
Liberal	Paul Jenkins	15,210	52.7	+1.0
Labor	Karen Overington	13,640	47.3	−1.0
Liberal hold		Swing	+1.0	

=== Bayswater ===
1992 Victorian state election: Bayswater
Party	Candidate	Votes	%	±%
Liberal	Gordon Ashley	16,806	53.8	+11.0
Labor	Kay Setches	11,586	37.1	−11.3
Independent	Norma Corr	2,844	9.1	+9.1
Total formal votes		31,236	96.8	−0.2
Informal votes		1,039	3.2	+0.2
Turnout		32,275	95.2	
Two-party-preferred result
Liberal	Gordon Ashley	17,807	57.1	+10.1
Labor	Kay Setches	13,365	42.9	−10.1
Liberal gain from Labor		Swing	+10.1	

=== Bellarine ===
1992 Victorian state election: Bellarine
Party	Candidate	Votes	%	±%
Liberal	Garry Spry	14,333	50.1	+7.3
Labor	Graham Ernst	10,402	36.3	−7.8
Geelong Community	Malcolm Brough	2,651	9.3	+9.3
Independent	Gary MacNeill	1,241	4.3	+4.3
Total formal votes		28,627	97.6	−0.1
Informal votes		706	2.4	+0.1
Turnout		29,333	95.9	
Two-party-preferred result
Liberal	Garry Spry	16,533	57.9	+6.8
Labor	Graham Ernst	12,026	42.1	−6.8
Liberal hold		Swing	+6.8	

=== Benalla ===
1992 Victorian state election: Benalla
Party	Candidate	Votes	%	±%
National	Pat McNamara	20,306	68.2	+25.8
Labor	Anne Cox	7,984	26.8	−0.3
Independent	Brian Lumsden	1,491	5.0	+5.0
Total formal votes		29,781	97.7	−0.2
Informal votes		686	2.3	+0.2
Turnout		30,467	95.8	
Two-party-preferred result
National	Pat McNamara	21,085	70.8	+0.2
Labor	Anne Cox	8,687	29.2	−0.2
National hold		Swing	+0.2	

=== Benambra ===
1992 Victorian state election: Benambra
Party	Candidate	Votes	%	±%
Liberal	Tony Plowman	12,737	44.3	−11.5
Labor	Phil Burrows	8,251	28.7	+2.5
Independent	Nelson McIntosh	5,105	17.8	+17.8
Independent	Kevin Smith	1,760	6.1	+6.1
Independent	Rosslyn Murtagh	893	3.1	+3.1
Total formal votes		28,746	96.9	−0.7
Informal votes		924	3.1	+0.7
Turnout		29,670	94.3	
Two-party-preferred result
Liberal	Tony Plowman	18,572	64.7	−7.1
Labor	Phil Burrows	10,113	35.3	+7.1
Liberal hold		Swing	−7.1	

=== Bendigo East ===
1992 Victorian state election: Bendigo East
Party	Candidate	Votes	%	±%
Liberal	Michael John	15,755	53.9	+13.6
Labor	Bill Murray	10,760	36.8	−4.9
Independent	Michael Carty	1,651	5.7	+5.7
Independent	Gayle Joyberry	1,042	3.6	+3.6
Total formal votes		29,208	97.8	−0.1
Informal votes		649	2.2	+0.1
Turnout		29,857	96.3	
Two-party-preferred result
Liberal	Michael John	17,245	59.1	+4.0
Labor	Bill Murray	11,959	40.9	−4.0
Liberal hold		Swing	+4.0	

=== Bendigo West ===
1992 Victorian state election: Bendigo West
Party	Candidate	Votes	%	±%
Labor	David Kennedy	13,763	45.5	−0.1
Liberal	Max Turner	10,788	35.7	+5.3
National	Tony Southcombe	3,995	13.2	−1.2
Independent	Brian Keogh	1,683	5.6	+5.6
Total formal votes		30,229	97.7	+0.3
Informal votes		703	2.3	−0.3
Turnout		30,932	96.1	
Two-party-preferred result
Liberal	Max Turner	15,433	51.1	+2.7
Labor	David Kennedy	14,760	48.9	−2.7
Liberal gain from Labor		Swing	+2.7	

=== Bennettswood ===
1992 Victorian state election: Bennettswood
Party	Candidate	Votes	%	±%
Liberal	Geoff Coleman	17,256	56.8	+6.0
Labor	Jan Kennedy	10,306	33.9	−7.7
Natural Law	Denis Quinlan	1,066	3.5	+3.5
Independent	David Veitch	973	3.2	+3.2
Independent	Douglas Johnston	801	2.6	+2.6
Total formal votes		30,402	96.3	−0.7
Informal votes		1,172	3.7	+0.7
Turnout		31,574	95.2	
Two-party-preferred result
Liberal	Geoff Coleman	18,756	61.8	+8.5
Labor	Jan Kennedy	11,594	38.2	−8.5
Liberal hold		Swing	+8.5	

=== Bentleigh ===
1992 Victorian state election: Bentleigh
Party	Candidate	Votes	%	±%
Liberal	Inga Peulich	16,197	52.6	+9.4
Labor	Ann Barker	11,316	36.8	−8.8
Independent	John Little	2,037	6.6	+6.6
Independent	Greg Alabaster	1,036	3.4	+3.4
Independent	David James	184	0.6	+0.6
Total formal votes		30,770	96.5	+0.6
Informal votes		1,115	3.5	−0.6
Turnout		31,885	95.0	
Two-party-preferred result
Liberal	Inga Peulich	17,856	58.2	+9.7
Labor	Ann Barker	12,843	41.8	−9.7
Liberal gain from Labor		Swing	+9.7	

=== Berwick ===
1992 Victorian state election: Berwick
Party	Candidate	Votes	%	±%
Liberal	Robert Dean	14,750	50.5	+5.5
Labor	Rob Jolly	10,786	36.9	−16.7
Independent	John Hastie	1,877	6.4	+6.4
Independent	Lynne Dickson	1,295	4.4	+4.4
Independent	Steve Maloney	491	1.7	+1.7
Total formal votes		29,199	95.8	+1.1
Informal votes		1,284	4.2	−1.1
Turnout		30,483	95.9	
Two-party-preferred result
Liberal	Robert Dean	16,512	57.0	+11.6
Labor	Rob Jolly	12,459	43.0	−11.6
Liberal gain from Labor		Swing	+11.6	

=== Box Hill ===
1992 Victorian state election: Box Hill
Party	Candidate	Votes	%	±%
Liberal	Robert Clark	18,547	60.3	+5.1
Labor	Margaret Ray	10,066	32.7	−8.7
Independent	John Baird	1,843	6.0	+6.0
Independent	David Shimmins	307	1.0	+1.0
Total formal votes		30,763	97.3	+0.2
Informal votes		850	2.7	−0.2
Turnout		31,613	95.3	
Two-party-preferred result
Liberal	Robert Clark	19,423	63.2	+6.2
Labor	Margaret Ray	11,298	36.8	−6.2
Liberal hold		Swing	+6.2	

=== Brighton ===
1992 Victorian state election: Brighton
Party	Candidate	Votes	%	±%
Liberal	Alan Stockdale	20,936	70.3	+8.8
Labor	Leigh Jones	7,016	23.5	−12.4
Natural Law	Keith Pryor	1,491	5.0	+5.0
Pensioner and CIR	John Casley	355	1.2	+1.2
Total formal votes		29,798	96.7	−0.4
Informal votes		1,004	3.3	+0.4
Turnout		30,802	94.0	
Two-party-preferred result
Liberal	Alan Stockdale	21,686	72.8	+10.2
Labor	Leigh Johns	8,092	27.2	−10.2
Liberal hold		Swing	+10.2	

=== Broadmeadows ===
1992 Victorian state election: Broadmeadows
Party	Candidate	Votes	%	±%
Labor	Jim Kennan	16,380	59.8	+1.8
Liberal	Geoff Lutz	7,259	26.5	+4.6
Independent	Lynda Blundell	3,768	13.7	+13.7
Total formal votes		27,407	94.7	+0.9
Informal votes		1,523	5.3	−0.9
Turnout		28,930	93.8	
Two-party-preferred result
Labor	Jim Kennan	18,995	69.4	+6.8
Liberal	Geoff Lutz	8,369	30.6	−6.8
Labor hold		Swing	+6.8	

=== Bulleen ===
1992 Victorian state election: Bulleen
Party	Candidate	Votes	%	±%
Liberal	David Perrin	20,200	68.2	+9.0
Labor	Peter De Angelis	9,399	31.8	−9.0
Total formal votes		29,599	95.8	+0.3
Informal votes		1,300	4.2	−0.3
Turnout		30,899	95.3	
Liberal hold		Swing	+9.0	

=== Bundoora ===
1992 Victorian state election: Bundoora
Party	Candidate	Votes	%	±%
Labor	Sherryl Garbutt	15,230	47.4	−11.3
Liberal	Olga Venables	14,832	46.2	+5.4
Natural Law	Santo Consolino	1,174	3.7	+3.7
Independent	Roman Klis	878	2.7	+2.7
Total formal votes		32,114	96.3	+0.1
Informal votes		1,245	3.7	−0.1
Turnout		33,359	96.2	
Two-party-preferred result
Labor	Sherryl Garbutt	16,390	51.1	−8.0
Liberal	Olga Venables	15,671	48.9	+8.0
Labor hold		Swing	−8.0	

=== Burwood ===
1992 Victorian state election: Burwood
Party	Candidate	Votes	%	±%
Liberal	Jeff Kennett	17,560	57.2	+7.7
Labor	Frank Dempsey	10,098	32.9	−11.8
Natural Law	Richard Aldous	1,265	4.1	+4.1
Independent	Jon Sonnberg	950	3.1	+3.1
Independent	Geoff Dreschler	800	2.6	+2.6
Total formal votes		30,673	96.8	−0.4
Informal votes		1,023	3.2	+0.4
Turnout		31,696	95.0	
Two-party-preferred result
Liberal	Jeff Kennett	18,157	59.3	+7.1
Labor	Frank Dempsey	12,452	40.7	−7.1
Liberal hold		Swing	+7.1	

=== Carrum ===
1992 Victorian state election: Carrum
Party	Candidate	Votes	%	±%
Liberal	John Robinson	14,374	46.7	+4.2
Labor	Mal Sandon	13,708	44.6	−11.2
Independent	Merran Jones	1,046	3.4	+3.4
Natural Law	Bev Nelson	931	3.0	+3.0
Independent	Mark Dunn	478	1.6	+1.6
Independent	Mark Williams	213	0.7	+0.7
Total formal votes		30,750	96.4	+0.0
Informal votes		1,163	3.6	−0.0
Turnout		31,913	95.4	
Two-party-preferred result
Labor	Mal Sandon	15,598	50.9	−5.7
Liberal	John Robinson	15,058	49.1	+5.7
Labor hold		Swing	−5.7	

=== Caulfield ===
1992 Victorian state election: Caulfield
Party	Candidate	Votes	%	±%
Liberal	Ted Tanner	19,842	63.9	+9.8
Labor	Valerie Nicholls	11,194	36.1	−9.8
Total formal votes		31,036	95.8	+0.4
Informal votes		1,365	4.2	−0.4
Turnout		32,401	93.1	
Liberal hold		Swing	+9.8	

=== Clayton ===
1992 Victorian state election: Clayton
Party	Candidate	Votes	%	±%
Labor	Gerard Vaughan	15,377	51.5	−6.7
Liberal	George Emmanouil	11,285	37.8	+3.6
Independent	Sue Phillips	1,132	3.8	+3.8
Independent	Bryan Rogerson	907	3.0	+3.0
Independent	Philip Kelada	611	2.0	+2.0
Independent	Jimmy Emmanuel	558	1.9	+1.9
Total formal votes		29,870	93.3	+0.3
Informal votes		2,158	6.7	−0.3
Turnout		32,028	93.8	
Two-party-preferred result
Labor	Gerard Vaughan	17,391	58.4	−2.6
Liberal	George Emmanouil	12,400	41.6	+2.6
Labor hold		Swing	−2.6	

=== Coburg ===
1992 Victorian state election: Coburg
Party	Candidate	Votes	%	±%
Labor	Tom Roper	14,662	50.8	−11.6
Liberal	Ross Lazzaro	8,394	29.1	+2.2
Independent	Norma Willoughby	2,396	8.3	+2.8
Pensioner and CIR	Katheryne Savage	1,506	5.2	+5.2
Independent	Jeff Sullivan	1,165	4.0	+4.0
Natural Law	Byron Rigby	725	2.5	+2.5
Total formal votes		28,848	94.1	+1.0
Informal votes		1,813	5.9	−1.0
Turnout		30,661	92.3	
Two-party-preferred result
Labor	Tom Roper	17,569	61.2	−4.5
Liberal	Ross Lazzaro	11,142	38.8	+4.5
Labor hold		Swing	−4.5	

=== Cranbourne ===
1992 Victorian state election: Cranbourne
Party	Candidate	Votes	%	±%
Liberal	Gary Rowe	15,949	51.8	+6.1
Labor	Ray Bastin	11,271	36.6	−10.6
Independent	Donald Brooke	763	2.5	+2.5
Independent	Lorelle O'Riley	703	2.3	+2.3
Independent	Bill McCluskey	652	2.1	+2.1
Natural Law	Gary Nelson	558	1.8	+1.8
Independent	Carol Fisher	542	1.8	+1.8
Independent	Eddy Van Eck	336	1.1	+1.1
Total formal votes		30,774	96.0	−0.7
Informal votes		1,267	4.0	+0.7
Turnout		32,041	96.8	
Two-party-preferred result
Liberal	Gary Rowe	16,771	54.7	+6.1
Labor	Ray Bastin	13,886	45.3	−6.1
Liberal gain from Labor		Swing	+6.1	

=== Dandenong ===
1992 Victorian state election: Dandenong
Party	Candidate	Votes	%	±%
Labor	John Pandazopoulos	13,386	45.6	−15.2
Liberal	Rodney Lavin	12,110	41.3	+2.6
Independent	Christine Ware	1,824	6.2	+6.2
Independent	Rob Wilson	1,584	5.4	+5.4
Independent	Ron Coomber	435	1.5	+1.5
Total formal votes		29,339	93.4	−0.7
Informal votes		2,060	6.6	+0.7
Turnout		31,399	94.9	
Two-party-preferred result
Labor	John Pandazopoulos	15,436	53.1	−8.1
Liberal	Rodney Lavin	13,661	46.9	+8.1
Labor hold		Swing	−8.1	

=== Dandenong North ===
1992 Victorian state election: Dandenong North
Party	Candidate	Votes	%	±%
Labor	Jan Wilson	14,673	50.1	−8.0
Liberal	Maree Luckins	14,637	49.9	+8.0
Total formal votes		29,310	94.5	+1.3
Informal votes		1,690	5.5	−1.3
Turnout		31,000	95.3	
Labor hold		Swing	−8.0	

=== Doncaster ===
1992 Victorian state election: Doncaster
Party	Candidate	Votes	%	±%
Liberal	Victor Perton	20,997	68.1	+10.6
Labor	Chris Nisiforou	9,848	31.9	−10.6
Total formal votes		30,845	96.1	−0.3
Informal votes		1,248	3.9	+0.3
Turnout		32,093	95.6	
Liberal hold		Swing	+10.6	

=== Dromana ===
1992 Victorian state election: Dromana
Party	Candidate	Votes	%	±%
Liberal	Tony Hyams	17,487	58.2	+8.1
Labor	Kenneth Templar	10,222	34.0	−11.5
Natural Law	Irenee Orr	2,331	7.8	+7.8
Total formal votes		30,040	97.0	−0.4
Informal votes		936	3.0	+0.4
Turnout		30,976	95.2	
Two-party-preferred result
Liberal	Tony Hyams	18,587	62.0	+10.8
Labor	Kenneth Templar	11,409	38.0	−10.8
Liberal hold		Swing	+10.8	

=== Eltham ===
1992 Victorian state election: Eltham
Party	Candidate	Votes	%	±%
Liberal	Wayne Phillips	18,823	57.0	+11.9
Labor	Alan Baker	11,514	34.9	−19.0
Independent	Bob West	1,504	4.6	+4.6
Natural Law	Steve Davies	1,185	3.6	+3.6
Total formal votes		33,026	97.3	+0.2
Informal votes		915	2.7	−0.2
Turnout		33,941	96.2	
Two-party-preferred result
Liberal	Wayne Phillips	19,794	60.0	+14.6
Labor	Alan Baker	13,175	40.0	−14.6
Liberal gain from Labor		Swing	+14.6	

=== Essendon ===
1992 Victorian state election: Essendon
Party	Candidate	Votes	%	±%
Labor	Judy Maddigan	13,046	44.0	−10.0
Liberal	Ian Davis	12,757	43.0	+1.0
Independent	Rowena Allsop	2,341	7.9	+7.9
Independent	Geoff Ireland	875	3.0	+3.0
Natural Law	John Bell	628	2.1	+2.1
Total formal votes		29,647	96.3	+0.7
Informal votes		1,145	3.7	−0.7
Turnout		30,792	93.8	
Two-party-preferred result
Liberal	Ian Davis	15,159	51.2	+6.7
Labor	Judy Maddigan	14,429	48.8	−6.7
Liberal gain from Labor		Swing	+6.7	

=== Evelyn ===
1992 Victorian state election: Evelyn
Party	Candidate	Votes	%	±%
Liberal	Jim Plowman	17,445	58.3	+6.6
Labor	Lydia MacMichael	9,003	30.1	−14.3
Independent	Rick Houlihan	3,473	11.6	+11.6
Total formal votes		29,921	96.7	−0.5
Informal votes		1,016	3.3	+0.5
Turnout		30,937	95.6	
Two-party-preferred result
Liberal	Jim Plowman	19,485	65.2	+12.0
Labor	Lydia MacMichael	10,382	34.8	−12.0
Liberal hold		Swing	+12.0	

=== Footscray ===
1992 Victorian state election: Footscray
Party	Candidate	Votes	%	±%
Labor	Bruce Mildenhall	16,408	57.9	−9.5
Liberal	Chris MacGregor	7,606	26.8	+1.0
Independent	Libby Krepp	2,123	7.5	+7.5
Independent	Hans Paas	1,060	3.7	+3.7
Independent	David Connolly	680	2.4	+2.4
Independent	Colleen Hartland	486	1.7	+1.7
Total formal votes		28,363	92.8	+0.8
Informal votes		2,207	7.2	−0.8
Turnout		30,570	93.7	
Two-party-preferred result
Labor	Bruce Mildenhall	18,719	66.2	−6.1
Liberal	Chris MacGregor	9,562	33.8	+6.1
Labor hold		Swing	−6.1	

=== Forest Hill ===
1992 Victorian state election: Forest Hill
Party	Candidate	Votes	%	±%
Liberal	John Richardson	19,989	65.3	+11.9
Labor	Helen Zenkis	10,600	34.7	−11.9
Total formal votes		30,589	96.0	−0.2
Informal votes		1,287	4.0	+0.2
Turnout		31,876	95.5	
Liberal hold		Swing	+11.9	

=== Frankston ===
1992 Victorian state election: Frankston
Party	Candidate	Votes	%	±%
Liberal	Graeme Weideman	18,447	63.2	+7.9
Labor	Rohan Cresp	8,192	28.1	−14.7
Natural Law	Margaret Dawson	1,217	4.2	+4.2
Independent	Judy Hale	903	3.1	+3.1
Independent	Richard Hargrave	411	1.4	+1.4
Total formal votes		29,170	97.2	+0.2
Informal votes		850	2.8	−0.2
Turnout		30,020	94.5	
Two-party-preferred result
Liberal	Graeme Weideman	19,661	67.5	+11.4
Labor	Rohan Cresp	9,451	32.5	−11.4
Liberal hold		Swing	+11.4	

=== Frankston East ===
1992 Victorian state election: Frankston East
Party	Candidate	Votes	%	±%
Liberal	Peter McLellan	12,470	46.6	+5.9
Labor	Jane Hill	11,661	43.6	−11.1
Pensioner and CIR	Ray Stirling	770	2.9	+2.9
Independent	David Taylor	669	2.5	+2.5
Independent	Mike Toldy	657	2.5	−2.1
Independent	Greg Graham	542	2.0	+2.0
Total formal votes		26,769	95.7	−0.6
Informal votes		1,197	4.3	+0.6
Turnout		27,966	96.2	
Two-party-preferred result
Liberal	Peter McLellan	13,407	50.2	+6.7
Labor	Jane Hill	13,276	49.8	−6.7
Liberal gain from Labor		Swing	+6.7	

=== Geelong ===
1992 Victorian state election: Geelong
Party	Candidate	Votes	%	±%
Liberal	Ann Henderson	14,388	45.8	+1.9
Labor	Hayden Shell	12,848	40.9	−8.9
Geelong Community	Roger Kent	4,201	13.4	+13.4
Total formal votes		31,437	97.2	+0.3
Informal votes		914	2.8	−0.3
Turnout		32,351	94.9	
Two-party-preferred result
Liberal	Ann Henderson	15,890	50.7	+3.3
Labor	Hayden Shell	15,478	49.3	−3.3
Liberal gain from Labor		Swing	+3.3	

=== Geelong North ===
1992 Victorian state election: Geelong North
Party	Candidate	Votes	%	±%
Labor	Peter Loney	15,653	52.2	−9.5
Liberal	Jim Fidge	10,965	36.6	+2.9
Geelong Community	Mae Dunstan	3,360	11.2	+11.2
Total formal votes		29,978	95.1	0.0
Informal votes		1,541	4.9	0.0
Turnout		31,519	95.8	
Two-party-preferred result
Labor	Peter Loney	17,826	59.6	−4.6
Liberal	Jim Fidge	12,102	40.4	+4.6
Labor hold		Swing	−4.6	

=== Gippsland East ===
1992 Victorian state election: Gippsland East
Party	Candidate	Votes	%	±%
National	David Treasure	16,225	56.5	+8.9
Labor	John Halloran	5,869	20.4	−9.1
Independent	Bruce Ellett	3,099	10.8	+10.8
Independent	Roger Steedman	1,732	6.0	+6.0
Independent	Ian Honey	1,274	4.4	+4.4
Independent	Bob Lansbury	526	1.8	+1.8
Total formal votes		28,725	97.8	−0.1
Informal votes		659	2.2	+0.1
Turnout		29,384	95.1	
Two-party-preferred result
National	David Treasure	21,053	73.4	+4.2
Labor	John Halloran	7,639	26.6	−4.2
National hold		Swing	+4.2	

=== Gippsland South ===
1992 Victorian state election: Gippsland South
Party	Candidate	Votes	%	±%
National	Peter Ryan	19,879	65.3	+17.2
Labor	Brian Burleigh	7,035	23.1	−3.1
Independent	Roger Stephens	2,596	8.5	+8.5
Independent	Vaughan Wareham	934	3.1	+3.1
Total formal votes		30,444	97.7	−0.3
Informal votes		706	2.3	+0.3
Turnout		31,150	95.2	
Two-party-preferred result
National	Peter Ryan	22,490	73.9	+2.9
Labor	Brian Burleigh	7,937	26.1	−2.9
National hold		Swing	+2.9	

=== Gippsland West ===
1992 Victorian state election: Gippsland West
Party	Candidate	Votes	%	±%
Liberal	Alan Brown	18,000	65.3	+13.6
Labor	Anwyn Martin	8,158	29.6	−6.9
Natural Law	Trevor Witt	1,424	5.2	+5.2
Total formal votes		27,582	97.4	−0.5
Informal votes		738	2.6	+0.5
Turnout		28,320	96.0	
Two-party-preferred result
Liberal	Alan Brown	18,700	67.9	+5.5
Labor	Anwyn Martin	8,847	32.1	−5.5
Liberal hold		Swing	+5.5	

=== Gisborne ===
1992 Victorian state election: Gisborne
Party	Candidate	Votes	%	±%
Liberal	Tom Reynolds	18,478	62.9	+7.7
Labor	Barry Rowe	10,905	37.1	−5.5
Total formal votes		29,383	97.1	−0.4
Informal votes		865	2.9	+0.4
Turnout		30,248	95.6	
Liberal hold		Swing	+5.5	

=== Glen Waverley ===
1992 Victorian state election: Glen Waverley
Party	Candidate	Votes	%	±%
Liberal	Ross Smith	19,774	67.0	+13.0
Labor	Ben Moon	8,081	27.4	−12.2
Independent	Peter Olney	1,652	5.6	+2.8
Total formal votes		29,507	96.8	+0.1
Informal votes		991	3.2	−0.1
Turnout		30,498	95.8	
Two-party-preferred result
Liberal	Ross Smith	20,477	69.5	+12.3
Labor	Ben Moon	8,969	30.5	−12.3
Liberal hold		Swing	+12.3	

=== Hawthorn ===
1992 Victorian state election: Hawthorn
Party	Candidate	Votes	%	±%
Liberal	Phil Gude	20,571	65.0	+6.4
Labor	Gordon McCaskie	8,096	25.6	−15.5
Natural Law	Lorna Scurfield	2,983	9.4	+9.4
Total formal votes		31,650	97.1	+0.2
Informal votes		933	2.9	−0.2
Turnout		32,583	94.0	
Two-party-preferred result
Liberal	Phil Gude	21,619	68.4	+9.6
Labor	Gordon McCaskie	9,984	31.6	−9.6
Liberal hold		Swing	+9.6	

=== Ivanhoe ===
1992 Victorian state election: Ivanhoe
Party	Candidate	Votes	%	±%
Liberal	Vin Heffernan	15,318	50.9	+6.3
Labor	Chris Watson	12,226	40.6	−9.3
Natural Law	Steve Griffith	1,315	4.4	+4.4
Independent	K.H. Schuller	858	2.8	+2.8
Independent	Steriani Vassis	406	1.3	+1.3
Total formal votes		30,123	96.4	+0.1
Informal votes		1,138	3.6	−0.1
Turnout		31,261	95.4	
Two-party-preferred result
Liberal	Vin Heffernan	16,330	54.3	+8.2
Labor	Chris Watson	13,743	45.7	−8.2
Liberal gain from Labor		Swing	+8.2	

=== Keilor ===
1992 Victorian state election: Keilor
Party	Candidate	Votes	%	±%
Labor	George Seitz	16,154	52.8	−4.9
Liberal	Stephen Carter	11,319	37.0	+3.4
Independent	Vanessa Wheeler	2,114	6.9	+6.9
Independent	Jim Miller	1,032	3.4	+3.4
Total formal votes		30,619	94.4	+2.4
Informal votes		1,809	5.6	−2.4
Turnout		32,428	95.5	
Two-party-preferred result
Labor	George Seitz	18,015	58.9	−1.6
Liberal	Stephen Carter	12,548	41.1	+1.6
Labor hold		Swing	−1.6	

=== Kew ===
1992 Victorian state election: Kew
Party	Candidate	Votes	%	±%
Liberal	Jan Wade	20,484	67.9	+5.6
Labor	Wayne Clarke	7,115	23.6	−14.2
Independent	Jonathan Shepherd	2,570	8.5	+8.5
Total formal votes		30,169	97.0	+0.3
Informal votes		946	3.0	−0.3
Turnout		31,115	94.1	
Two-party-preferred result
Liberal	Jan Wade	21,553	71.5	+9.3
Labor	Wayne Clarke	8,578	28.5	−9.3
Liberal hold		Swing	+9.3	

=== Knox ===
1992 Victorian state election: Knox
Party	Candidate	Votes	%	±%
Liberal	Hurtle Lupton	15,281	50.2	+9.2
Labor	Carolyn Hirsh	11,081	36.4	−16.6
Independent	Peter Herbert	2,350	7.7	+7.7
Independent	Bill Johnson	1,725	5.7	+5.7
Total formal votes		30,437	97.0	+0.7
Informal votes		926	3.0	−0.7
Turnout		31,363	95.9	
Two-party-preferred result
Liberal	Hurtle Lupton	17,005	56.1	+11.1
Labor	Carolyn Hirsh	13,292	43.9	−11.1
Liberal gain from Labor		Swing	+11.1	

=== Malvern ===
1992 Victorian state election: Malvern
Party	Candidate	Votes	%	±%
Liberal	Robert Doyle	21,065	68.7	+5.6
Labor	Anthony van der Craats	7,342	24.0	−12.5
Natural Law	Lesley Mendelson	2,243	7.3	+7.3
Total formal votes		30,650	97.2	+0.4
Informal votes		876	2.8	−0.4
Turnout		31,526	93.3	
Two-party-preferred result
Liberal	Robert Doyle	22,196	72.5	+9.2
Labor	Anthony van der Craats	8,426	27.5	−9.2
Liberal hold		Swing	+9.2	

=== Melbourne ===
1992 Victorian state election: Melbourne
Party	Candidate	Votes	%	±%
Labor	Neil Cole	14,731	51.5	−15.9
Liberal	Kate Nunan	9,391	32.8	+1.5
Democrats	Bryce Vissel	2,319	8.1	+8.1
Independent	Dean Reynolds	824	2.9	+2.9
Independent	Dave Holmes	658	2.3	+2.3
Natural Law	Tony Botsman	517	1.8	+1.8
Independent	John Dobinson	156	0.5	+0.5
Total formal votes		28,596	94.0	+0.7
Informal votes		1,826	6.0	−0.7
Turnout		30,422	90.6	
Two-party-preferred result
Labor	Neil Cole	17,721	62.1	−5.8
Liberal	Kate Nunan	10,807	37.9	+5.8
Labor hold		Swing	−5.8	

=== Melton ===
1992 Victorian state election: Melton
Party	Candidate	Votes	%	±%
Labor	David Cunningham	15,184	53.0	−3.7
Liberal	Therese Samson	10,159	35.5	+3.9
Independent	Peter Taylor	1,903	6.6	+6.6
Independent	David Toms	1,377	4.8	+4.8
Total formal votes		28,623	95.1	+0.2
Informal votes		1,462	4.9	−0.2
Turnout		30,085	95.3	
Two-party-preferred result
Labor	David Cunningham	16,883	60.0	−2.1
Liberal	Therese Samson	11,236	40.0	+2.1
Labor hold		Swing	−2.1	

=== Mildura ===
1992 Victorian state election: Mildura
Party	Candidate	Votes	%	±%
Liberal	Craig Bildstien	19,141	65.9	+33.6
Labor	John Zigouras	7,130	24.6	+2.9
Independent	Tom Campbell	2,763	9.5	+9.5
Total formal votes		29,034	97.5	+0.0
Informal votes		735	2.5	−0.0
Turnout		29,769	96.2	
Two-party-preferred result
Liberal	Craig Bildstien	20,579	70.9	+1.1
Labor	John Zigouras	8,455	29.1	−1.1
Liberal hold		Swing	+1.1	

=== Mill Park ===
1992 Victorian state election: Mill Park
Party	Candidate	Votes	%	±%
Labor	Alex Andrianopoulos	14,722	50.0	−18.4
Liberal	Anthony Fernandez	8,265	28.1	+0.1
Independent	Christine Craik	4,267	14.5	+14.5
Independent	Janko Georgievski	2,199	7.5	+7.5
Total formal votes		29,453	94.9	+1.7
Informal votes		1,567	5.1	+1.7
Turnout		31,020	96.1	
Two-party-preferred result
Labor	Alex Andrianopoulos	18,318	62.3	−8.4
Liberal	Anthony Fernandez	11,065	37.7	+8.4
Labor hold		Swing	−8.4	

=== Mitcham ===
1992 Victorian state election: Mitcham
Party	Candidate	Votes	%	±%
Liberal	Roger Pescott	16,735	54.4	+11.6
Labor	John Harrowfield	11,504	37.4	−8.9
Independent	Gilbert Boffa	2,516	8.2	+8.2
Total formal votes		30,755	97.0	−0.2
Informal votes		962	3.0	+0.2
Turnout		31,717	95.8	
Two-party-preferred result
Liberal	Roger Pescott	17,966	58.5	+10.8
Labor	John Harrowfield	12,726	41.5	−10.8
Liberal gain from Labor		Swing	+10.8	

=== Monbulk ===
1992 Victorian state election: Monbulk
Party	Candidate	Votes	%	±%
Liberal	Steve McArthur	14,584	50.8	+8.4
Labor	Neil Pope	10,368	36.1	−16.0
Independent	Jenny Saulwick	1,646	5.7	+5.7
Democrats	John McLaren	1,568	5.5	+5.2
Natural Law	Bill Watson	542	1.9	+1.9
Total formal votes		28,708	96.9	−0.3
Informal votes		907	3.1	+0.3
Turnout		29,615	95.6	
Two-party-preferred result
Liberal	Steve McArthur	15,814	55.3	+9.6
Labor	Neil Pope	12,771	44.7	−9.6
Liberal gain from Labor		Swing	+9.6	

=== Mooroolbark ===
1992 Victorian state election: Mooroolbark
Party	Candidate	Votes	%	±%
Liberal	Lorraine Elliott	16,114	55.3	+11.1
Labor	Mike Welsh	9,880	33.9	−13.4
Independent	George Moran	1,422	4.9	+4.9
Natural Law	Robert Kendi	994	3.4	+3.4
Independent	Steve Raskovy	741	2.5	+2.5
Total formal votes		29,151	96.7	−0.3
Informal votes		987	3.3	+0.3
Turnout		30,138	98.0	
Two-party-preferred result
Liberal	Lorraine Elliott	17,469	60.1	+12.0
Labor	Mike Welsh	11,596	39.9	−12.0
Liberal gain from Labor		Swing	+12.0	

=== Mordialloc ===
1992 Victorian state election: Mordialloc
Party	Candidate	Votes	%	±%
Liberal	Geoff Leigh	15,828	54.3	+9.1
Labor	Peter Spyker	11,308	38.8	−10.3
Independent	Declan Stephenson	1,157	4.0	+4.0
Independent	Klara Mitchell	876	3.0	+3.0
Total formal votes		29,169	96.4	−0.1
Informal votes		1,093	3.6	+0.1
Turnout		30,262	95.2	
Two-party-preferred result
Liberal	Geoff Leigh	16,696	57.3	+9.5
Labor	Peter Spyker	12,418	42.7	−9.5
Liberal gain from Labor		Swing	+9.5	

=== Mornington ===
1992 Victorian state election: Mornington
Party	Candidate	Votes	%	±%
Liberal	Robin Cooper	16,760	59.8	+10.4
Labor	Carlyle La'Brooy	9,262	33.0	−10.8
Natural Law	Jan Charlwood	2,015	7.2	+7.2
Total formal votes		28,037	96.7	+0.0
Informal votes		944	3.3	−0.0
Turnout		28,981	95.2	
Two-party-preferred result
Liberal	Robin Cooper	17,620	62.9	+11.6
Labor	Carlyle La'Brooy	10,406	37.1	−11.6
Liberal hold		Swing	+11.6	

=== Morwell ===
1992 Victorian state election: Morwell
Party	Candidate	Votes	%	±%
Labor	Keith Hamilton	13,524	43.1	+1.3
Liberal	Martin Hill	8,177	26.0	+5.9
National	Tom Wallace	5,169	16.5	+2.4
Independent	Barry Murphy	3,694	11.8	−0.7
Independent	Bill Mele	642	2.0	+2.0
Natural Law	Martin Kirsch	195	0.6	+0.6
Total formal votes		31,401	97.2	+0.6
Informal votes		889	2.8	−0.6
Turnout		32,290	96.4	
Two-party-preferred result
Labor	Keith Hamilton	16,906	54.0	+1.8
Liberal	Martin Hill	14,428	46.0	−1.8
Labor hold		Swing	+1.8	

=== Murray Valley ===
1992 Victorian state election: Murray Valley
Party	Candidate	Votes	%	±%
National	Ken Jasper	22,744	74.0	+15.3
Labor	Maria Keller	7,999	26.0	+0.2
Total formal votes		30,743	97.4	−0.6
Informal votes		806	2.6	+0.6
Turnout		31,549	95.1	
National hold		Swing	+2.2	

=== Narracan ===
1992 Victorian state election: Narracan
Party	Candidate	Votes	%	±%
Liberal	John Delzoppo	15,352	52.3	+10.6
Labor	Brendan Jenkins	11,794	40.2	−3.9
Independent	Trisha Taig	1,456	5.0	+5.0
Independent	John Cross	731	2.5	+2.5
Total formal votes		29,333	97.6	+0.1
Informal votes		712	2.4	−0.1
Turnout		30,045	96.4	
Two-party-preferred result
Liberal	John Delzoppo	16,219	55.4	+3.7
Labor	Brendan Jenkins	13,080	44.6	−3.7
Liberal hold		Swing	+3.7	

=== Niddrie ===
1992 Victorian state election: Niddrie
Party	Candidate	Votes	%	±%
Labor	Bob Sercombe	13,827	47.4	−6.8
Liberal	David Davis	11,799	40.5	+2.3
Independent	Sam Ortisi	2,021	6.9	+6.9
Independent	Dorothy Costa	961	3.3	+3.3
Independent	Maria Ferrigno	551	1.9	+1.9
Total formal votes		29,159	94.8	+0.4
Informal votes		1,597	5.2	−0.4
Turnout		30,756	96.0	
Two-party-preferred result
Labor	Bob Sercombe	15,594	53.6	−4.4
Liberal	David Davis	13,503	46.4	+4.4
Labor hold		Swing	−4.4	

=== Northcote ===
1992 Victorian state election: Northcote
Party	Candidate	Votes	%	±%
Labor	Tony Sheehan	16,288	55.1	−16.5
Liberal	Nicholas Kotsiras	8,212	27.8	−0.6
Independent	Carolyn Purdue	2,337	7.9	+7.9
Independent	Frank Ryan	1,228	4.2	+4.2
Natural Law	Michael Dickins	473	1.6	+1.6
Independent	Joe Kenwright	320	1.1	+1.1
Call to Australia	Ken Cook	257	0.9	+0.9
Independent	John Graham	236	0.8	+0.8
Independent	Dimitrios Karmis	201	0.7	+0.7
Total formal votes		29,552	93.0	+0.1
Informal votes		2,234	7.0	−0.1
Turnout		31,786	93.8	
Two-party-preferred result
Labor	Tony Sheehan	19,213	65.2	−6.5
Liberal	Nicholas Kotsiras	10,271	34.8	+6.5
Labor hold		Swing	−6.5	

=== Oakleigh ===
1992 Victorian state election: Oakleigh
Party	Candidate	Votes	%	±%
Liberal	Denise McGill	15,485	52.9	+13.3
Labor	Race Mathews	13,783	47.1	−2.0
Total formal votes		29,268	95.5	+0.0
Informal votes		1,376	4.5	−0.0
Turnout		30,644	94.1	
Liberal gain from Labor		Swing	+8.6	

=== Pakenham ===
1992 Victorian state election: Pakenham
Party	Candidate	Votes	%	±%
Liberal	Rob Maclellan	16,251	57.8	+7.2
Labor	Roy Ashcroft	8,161	29.0	−12.9
Independent	Gary Hipworth	2,825	10.0	+10.0
Natural Law	John Hannon	882	3.1	+3.1
Total formal votes		28,119	97.2	−0.2
Informal votes		813	2.8	+0.2
Turnout		28,932	95.1	
Two-party-preferred result
Liberal	Rob Maclellan	18,047	64.4	+11.0
Labor	Roy Ashcroft	9,975	35.6	−11.0
Liberal hold		Swing	+11.0	

=== Pascoe Vale ===
1992 Victorian state election: Pascoe Vale
Party	Candidate	Votes	%	±%
Labor	Kelvin Thomson	14,332	51.7	−2.2
Liberal	Con Karavitis	10,374	37.4	+6.7
Independent	Cath Price	1,979	7.1	+0.7
Independent	Anne Petrou	1,031	3.7	+3.7
Total formal votes		27,716	95.8	+0.4
Informal votes		1,224	4.2	−0.4
Turnout		28,940	93.7	
Two-party-preferred result
Labor	Kelvin Thomson	16,054	58.0	−0.1
Liberal	Con Karavitis	11,605	42.0	+0.1
Labor hold		Swing	−0.1	

=== Polwarth ===
1992 Victorian state election: Polwarth
Party	Candidate	Votes	%	±%
Liberal	Ian Smith	19,764	65.8	+12.7
Labor	Fran Lehmann	10,252	34.2	+1.7
Total formal votes		30,016	96.9	−1.0
Informal votes		971	3.1	+1.0
Turnout		30,987	95.9	
Liberal hold		Swing	+1.7	

=== Portland ===
1992 Victorian state election: Portland
Party	Candidate	Votes	%	±%
Liberal	Denis Napthine	19,409	67.1	+20.5
Labor	Bill Sharrock	9,522	32.9	−0.6
Total formal votes		28,931	97.3	−1.1
Informal votes		789	2.7	+1.1
Turnout		29,720	96.1	
Liberal hold		Swing	+4.5	

=== Prahran ===
1992 Victorian state election: Prahran
Party	Candidate	Votes	%	±%
Liberal	Don Hayward	16,502	54.8	+6.4
Labor	Cynthia Levey	10,682	35.4	−11.3
Greens	Francesca Davidson	1,863	6.2	+6.2
Natural Law	Greg Broszczyk	1,086	3.6	+3.6
Total formal votes		30,133	95.9	+0.6
Informal votes		1,291	4.1	−0.6
Turnout		31,424	89.5	
Two-party-preferred result
Liberal	Don Hayward	17,387	57.8	+7.5
Labor	Cynthia Levey	12,678	42.2	−7.5
Liberal hold		Swing	+7.5	

=== Preston ===
1992 Victorian state election: Preston
Party	Candidate	Votes	%	±%
Labor	Michael Leighton	17,403	59.6	−3.1
Liberal	George Prillwitz	9,382	32.1	+3.9
Independent	Rose-Marie Celestin	1,148	3.9	+3.9
Independent	Justin Armstrong	824	2.8	+2.8
Natural Law	Richard Barnes	427	1.5	+1.5
Total formal votes		29,184	93.7	+0.3
Informal votes		1,958	6.3	−0.3
Turnout		31,142	94.0	
Two-party-preferred result
Labor	Michael Leighton	19,278	66.2	−2.4
Liberal	George Prillwitz	9,854	33.8	+2.4
Labor hold		Swing	−2.4	

=== Richmond ===
1992 Victorian state election: Richmond
Party	Candidate	Votes	%	±%
Labor	Demetri Dollis	15,945	53.3	−7.8
Liberal	Peter Graham	8,554	28.6	+5.5
Independent	Geoff Millman	1,322	4.4	+4.4
Democrats	Gordon McQuilten	1,193	4.0	+4.0
Independent	Sunny Seau	691	2.3	+2.3
Natural Law	Larry Clarke	464	1.6	+1.6
Independent	Barry Gration	452	1.5	+1.5
Independent	Jason Maher	409	1.4	+1.4
Independent	Bill Hampson	396	1.3	−3.7
Independent	Steve Florin	373	1.2	−2.8
Independent	Ray Fulcher	127	0.4	+0.4
Total formal votes		29,926	93.1	+0.6
Informal votes		2,224	6.9	−0.6
Turnout		32,150	91.5	
Two-party-preferred result
Labor	Demetri Dollis	18,858	63.3	−4.1
Liberal	Peter Graham	10,939	36.7	+4.1
Labor hold		Swing	−4.1	

=== Ripon ===
1992 Victorian state election: Ripon
Party	Candidate	Votes	%	±%
Liberal	Steve Elder	16,028	53.7	−0.3
Labor	Hilary Hunt	10,922	36.6	−6.7
Independent	Gwenda Allgood	2,902	9.7	+9.7
Total formal votes		29,852	97.8	+0.0
Informal votes		664	2.2	−0.0
Turnout		30,516	96.5	
Two-party-preferred result
Liberal	Steve Elder	17,057	57.1	+1.1
Labor	Hilary Hunt	12,795	42.9	−1.1
Liberal hold		Swing	+1.1	

=== Rodney ===
1992 Victorian state election: Rodney
Party	Candidate	Votes	%	±%
National	Noel Maughan	21,404	72.0	+5.8
Labor	Jason Price	6,137	20.6	+0.4
Independent	Dennis Lacey	2,202	7.4	+7.4
Total formal votes		29,743	97.7	−0.7
Informal votes		710	2.3	+0.7
Turnout		30,453	96.4	
Two-party-preferred result
National	Noel Maughan	22,612	76.0	−2.3
Labor	Jason Price	7,128	24.0	+2.3
National hold		Swing	−2.3	

=== Sandringham ===
1992 Victorian state election: Sandringham
Party	Candidate	Votes	%	±%
Liberal	Murray Thompson	20,069	65.6	+11.8
Labor	Roland Lindell	7,715	25.2	−17.8
Natural Law	Brian Gale	2,804	9.2	+9.2
Total formal votes		30,588	97.1	−0.4
Informal votes		907	2.9	+0.4
Turnout		31,495	94.8	
Two-party-preferred result
Liberal	Murray Thompson	21,342	69.9	+14.3
Labor	Roland Lindell	9,207	30.1	−14.3
Liberal hold		Swing	+14.3	

=== Seymour ===
1992 Victorian state election: Seymour
Party	Candidate	Votes	%	±%
Liberal	Marie Tehan	13,869	47.3	+4.4
Labor	Ian Rogers	9,723	33.1	−12.8
National	Rod Henderson	3,332	11.4	+2.4
Pensioner and CIR	Jim McKinnon	1,213	4.1	+4.1
Independent	Maurie Smith	1,207	4.1	+4.1
Total formal votes		29,344	96.9	−0.3
Informal votes		944	3.1	+0.3
Turnout		30,288	95.6	
Two-party-preferred result
Liberal	Marie Tehan	17,821	61.0	+8.1
Labor	Ian Rogers	11,415	39.0	−8.1
Liberal hold		Swing	+8.1	

=== Shepparton ===
1992 Victorian state election: Shepparton
Party	Candidate	Votes	%	±%
National	Don Kilgour	20,385	69.5	+14.8
Labor	John Sheen	8,962	30.5	+3.9
Total formal votes		29,347	96.8	−0.8
Informal votes		974	3.2	+0.8
Turnout		30,321	95.8	
National hold		Swing	−2.0	

=== South Barwon ===
1992 Victorian state election: South Barwon
Party	Candidate	Votes	%	±%
Liberal	Alister Paterson	13,970	48.4	−2.9
Labor	Frances Patrick	8,392	29.1	−13.2
Independent	Harley Dickinson	3,589	12.4	+12.4
Geelong Community	Karan Dawson	2,035	7.0	+7.0
Call to Australia	Gary Lyons	886	3.1	−3.3
Total formal votes		28,872	97.4	−0.1
Informal votes		758	2.6	+0.1
Turnout		29,630	95.9	
Two-party-preferred result
Liberal	Alister Paterson	17,521	60.8	+6.7
Labor	Frances Patrick	11,280	39.2	−6.7
Liberal gain from Independent		Swing	N/A	

=== Springvale ===
1992 Victorian state election: Springvale
Party	Candidate	Votes	%	±%
Labor	Eddie Micallef	15,569	51.7	−7.6
Liberal	Mario Dodic	11,902	39.5	+2.5
Independent	Lorna Stevenson	2,656	8.8	+8.8
Total formal votes		30,127	94.2	+1.3
Informal votes		1,842	5.8	−1.3
Turnout		31,969	95.2	
Two-party-preferred result
Labor	Eddie Micallef	17,420	58.0	−3.0
Liberal	Mario Dodic	12,603	42.0	+3.0
Labor hold		Swing	−3.0	

=== Sunshine ===
1992 Victorian state election: Sunshine
Party	Candidate	Votes	%	±%
Labor	Ian Baker	17,918	58.7	−2.3
Liberal	Bernard Reilly	8,795	28.8	+0.9
Independent	Marion Martin	1,628	5.3	+5.3
Independent	Charles Skidmore	1,507	4.9	+4.9
Independent	Z. A. Derwinski	684	2.2	+2.2
Total formal votes		30,532	92.2	+1.7
Informal votes		2,583	7.8	−1.7
Turnout		33,115	94.4	
Two-party-preferred result
Labor	Ian Baker	19,296	63.3	−1.7
Liberal	Bernard Reilly	11,172	36.7	+1.7
Labor hold		Swing	−1.7	

=== Swan Hill ===
1992 Victorian state election: Swan Hill
Party	Candidate	Votes	%	±%
National	Barry Steggall	22,361	75.4	+16.3
Labor	Vera Alcock	4,981	16.8	−3.4
Independent	Geoff Burnside	2,306	7.8	+7.8
Total formal votes		29,648	97.6	−0.6
Informal votes		731	2.4	+0.6
Turnout		30,379	96.3	
Two-party-preferred result
National	Barry Steggall	23,551	79.4	+1.9
Labor	Vera Alcock	6,092	20.6	−1.9
National hold		Swing	+1.9	

=== Thomastown ===
1992 Victorian state election: Thomastown
Party	Candidate	Votes	%	±%
Labor	Peter Batchelor	16,592	57.4	−8.3
Liberal	Riza Kozanoglu	6,929	24.0	−1.6
Independent	Jim Thomev	3,097	10.7	+10.7
Independent	Christos Karamoshos	1,014	3.5	+3.5
Independent	Marianna Cuni	849	2.9	+2.9
Independent	Ken Mantell	428	1.5	+1.5
Total formal votes		28,909	91.9	+0.8
Informal votes		2,541	8.1	−0.8
Turnout		31,450	95.0	
Two-party-preferred result
Labor	Peter Batchelor	20,172	70.0	+0.9
Liberal	Riza Kozanoglu	8,648	30.0	−0.9
Labor hold		Swing	+0.9	

=== Tullamarine ===
1992 Victorian state election: Tullamarine
Party	Candidate	Votes	%	±%
Liberal	Bernie Finn	13,032	44.2	+2.3
Labor	Peter Gavin	11,823	40.1	−11.9
Independent	Jack Ogilvie	1,511	5.1	+5.1
Independent	Veronica Burgess	1,235	4.2	+4.2
Independent	Cheryl Hildebrandt	1,207	4.1	+4.1
Independent	Andy Govanstone	703	2.4	+2.4
Total formal votes		29,511	95.5	−0.3
Informal votes		1,385	4.5	+0.3
Turnout		30,896	96.0	
Two-party-preferred result
Liberal	Bernie Finn	15,158	51.5	+6.4
Labor	Peter Gavin	14,264	48.5	−6.4
Liberal gain from Labor		Swing	+6.4	

=== Wantirna ===
1992 Victorian state election: Wantirna
Party	Candidate	Votes	%	±%
Liberal	Kim Wells	17,683	59.4	+11.4
Labor	Peter Lockwood	9,313	31.3	−17.8
Independent	John Le Fevre	2,789	9.4	+9.4
Total formal votes		29,784	96.5	0.0
Informal votes		1,076	3.5	0.0
Turnout		30,860	96.0	
Two-party-preferred result
Liberal	Kim Wells	19,046	64.1	+14.2
Labor	Peter Lockwood	10,653	35.9	−14.2
Liberal gain from Labor		Swing	+14.2	

=== Warrandyte ===
1992 Victorian state election: Warrandyte
Party	Candidate	Votes	%	±%
Liberal	Phil Honeywood	18,108	63.3	+15.5
Labor	Philip Moran	7,664	26.8	−16.2
Independent	Neil Macdonald	2,828	9.9	+9.9
Total formal votes		28,600	97.7	+0.3
Informal votes		677	2.3	−0.3
Turnout		29,277	95.8	
Two-party-preferred result
Liberal	Phil Honeywood	19,041	66.7	+14.7
Labor	Philip Moran	9,491	33.3	−14.7
Liberal hold		Swing	+14.7	

=== Warrnambool ===
1992 Victorian state election: Warrnambool
Party	Candidate	Votes	%	±%
National	John McGrath	23,400	75.8	+25.8
Labor	William Thompson	7,454	24.2	+2.5
Total formal votes		30,854	97.9	−0.6
Informal votes		649	2.1	+0.6
Turnout		31,503	97.1	
National hold		Swing	−1.4	

=== Werribee ===
1992 Victorian state election: Werribee
Party	Candidate	Votes	%	±%
Labor	Ken Coghill	14,857	48.6	−6.8
Liberal	Anne Canterbury	10,632	34.8	+3.3
Independent	Shane Bourke	5,102	16.7	+16.7
Total formal votes		30,591	97.1	+0.5
Informal votes		927	2.9	−0.5
Turnout		31,518	96.5	
Two-party-preferred result
Labor	Ken Coghill	17,797	58.3	−1.7
Liberal	Anne Canterbury	12,729	41.7	+1.7
Labor hold		Swing	−1.7	

=== Williamstown ===
1992 Victorian state election: Williamstown
Party	Candidate	Votes	%	±%
Labor	Joan Kirner	17,167	58.7	−7.5
Liberal	Jeff Bird	8,543	29.2	+2.2
Independent	Vern Hughes	1,299	4.4	+4.4
Independent	Paul Holmes	1,218	4.2	+4.2
Independent	Daniel Cumming	1,038	3.5	+3.5
Total formal votes		29,265	94.3	+1.0
Informal votes		1,755	5.7	−1.0
Turnout		31,020	94.6	
Two-party-preferred result
Labor	Joan Kirner	18,734	64.2	−7.0
Liberal	Jeff Bird	10,465	35.8	+7.0
Labor hold		Swing	−7.0	

=== Wimmera ===
1992 Victorian state election: Wimmera
Party	Candidate	Votes	%	±%
National	Bill McGrath	25,325	79.6	+30.0
Labor	Felix Blatt	6,485	20.4	−0.9
Total formal votes		31,810	97.6	−0.7
Informal votes		794	2.4	+0.7
Turnout		32,604	97.3	
National hold		Swing	+2.0	

=== Yan Yean ===
1992 Victorian state election: Yan Yean
Party	Candidate	Votes	%	±%
Liberal	Bill Willis	12,567	44.1	+1.6
Labor	Andre Haermeyer	12,113	42.5	−14.9
Natural Law	Julie Nihill	1,515	5.3	+5.3
Independent	Nazio Mancini	1,411	5.0	+5.0
Independent	Eleonora Cichello	430	1.5	+1.5
Independent	Trevor Goodwin	257	0.9	+0.9
Independent	Peter Brambilla	210	0.7	+0.7
Total formal votes		28,503	95.4	−0.6
Informal votes		1,359	4.6	+0.6
Turnout		29,862	96.5	
Two-party-preferred result
Labor	Andre Haermeyer	14,754	51.9	−5.5
Liberal	Bill Willis	13,665	48.1	+5.5
Labor hold		Swing	−5.5	

== See also ==
- 1992 Victorian state election
- Candidates of the 1992 Victorian state election
- Members of the Victorian Legislative Assembly, 1992–1996
