= Candidates of the 1992 Victorian state election =

The 1992 Victorian state election was held on 3 October 1992.

== Retiring Members ==
=== Labor ===
- John Cain MLA (Bundoora)
- Steve Crabb MLA (Knox)
- Robert Fordham MLA (Footscray)
- Andrew McCutcheon MLA (St Kilda)
- Max McDonald MLA (Whittlesea)
- Terry Norris MLA (Dandenong)
- Jim Simmonds MLA (Reservoir)
- Neil Trezise MLA (Geelong North)
- Joan Coxsedge MLC (Melbourne West)
- George Crawford MLC (Jika Jika)
- Giovanni Sgro MLC (Melbourne North)
- Evan Walker MLC (Melbourne)

=== Liberal ===
- Tom Austin MLA (Ripon)
- David Lea MLA (Sandringham)
- Lou Lieberman MLA (Benambra)
- Alan Hunt MLC (South Eastern)
- Robert Lawson MLC (Higinbotham)
- Dick Long MLC (Gippsland)
- Reg Macey MLC (Monash)

=== National ===
- Bruce Evans MLA (Gippsland East)
- Ken Wright MLC (North Western)

== Legislative Assembly ==
Sitting members are shown in bold text. Successful candidates are highlighted in the relevant colour. Where there is possible confusion, an asterisk (*) is also used.

Electorate	Held by	Labor candidates	Coalition candidates	Other candidates
Albert Park	Labor	John Thwaites	Wendy Smith (Lib)	Anne Fahey (Ind); Caroline Hockley (NLP); Jill Rothwell (Ind); Shane Tonks (Ind)
Altona	Labor	Carole Marple	Timothy Warner (Lib)	Peter Haberecht (Ind); Leon Staropoli (NLP)
Ballarat East	Liberal	**Frank Sheehan**	Barry Traynor (Lib)	Petra Krjutschkow (Ind)
Ballarat West	Liberal	Karen Overington	Paul Jenkins (Lib)	Joan Chambers (Ind); Noel Vodden (Ind); David White (Ind)
Bayswater	Labor	**Kay Setches**	Gordon Ashley (Lib)	Norma Corr (Ind)
Bellarine	Liberal	**Graham Ernst**	Garry Spry (Lib)	Malcolm Brough (GCA); Gary MacNeill (Ind)
Benalla	National	Anne Cox	**Pat McNamara** (Nat)	Brian Lumsden (Ind)
Benambra	Liberal	Phil Burrows	Tony Plowman (Lib)	Nelson McIntosh (Ind); Rosslyn Murtagh (Ind); Kevin Smith (Ind)
Bendigo East	Liberal	Bill Murray	**Michael John** (Lib)	Michael Carty (Ind); Gayle Joyberry (Ind)
Bendigo West	Labor	**David Kennedy**	Tony Southcombe (Nat); Max Turner* (Lib)	Brian Keogh (Ind)
Bennettswood	Liberal	Jan Kennedy	**Geoff Coleman** (Lib)	Douglas Johnston (Ind); Denis Quinlan (NLP); David Veitch (Ind)
Bentleigh	Labor	**Ann Barker**	Inga Peulich (Lib)	Greg Alabaster (Ind); David James (Ind); John Little (Ind)
Berwick	Labor	**Rob Jolly**	Robert Dean (Lib)	Lynne Dickson (Ind); John Hastie (Ind); Steve Maloney (Ind)
Box Hill	Liberal	**Margaret Ray**	**Robert Clark** (Lib)	John Baird (Ind); David Shimmins (Ind)
Brighton	Liberal	Leigh Jones	**Alan Stockdale** (Lib)	John Casley (PCIRA); Keith Pryor (NLP)
Broadmeadows	Labor	**Jim Kennan**	Geoff Lutz (Lib)	Lynda Blundell (Ind)
Bulleen	Liberal	Peter De Angelis	**David Perrin** (Lib)	
Bundoora	Labor	**Sherryl Garbutt**	Olga Venables (Lib)	Santo Consolino (NLP); Roman Klis (Ind)
Burwood	Liberal	Frank Dempsey	**Jeff Kennett** (Lib)	Richard Aldous (NLP); Geoff Dreschler (Ind); Jon Sonnberg (Ind)
Carrum	Labor	**Mal Sandon**	John Robinson (Lib)	Mark Dunn (Ind); Merran Jones (Ind); Bev Nelson (NLP); Mark Williams (Ind)
Caulfield	Liberal	Valerie Nicholls	**Ted Tanner** (Lib)	
Clayton	Labor	**Gerard Vaughan**	George Emmanouil (Lib)	Jimmy Emmanuel (Ind); Philip Kelada (Ind); Sue Phillips (Ind); Bryan Rogerson (Ind)
Coburg	Labor	**Tom Roper**	Ross Lazzaro (Lib)	Byron Rigby (NLP); Katheryne Savage (PCIRA); Jeff Sullivan (Ind); Norma Willoughby (Ind)
Cranbourne	Labor	Ray Bastin	Gary Rowe (Lib)	Donald Brooke (Ind); Carol Fisher (Ind); Bill McCluskey (Ind); Gary Nelson (NLP); Lorelle O'Riley (Ind); Eddy Van Eck (Ind)
Dandenong	Labor	John Pandazopoulos	Rodney Lavin (Lib)	Ron Coomber (Ind); Christine Ware (Ind); Rob Wilson (Ind)
Dandenong North	Labor	**Jan Wilson**	Maree Luckins (Lib)	
Doncaster	Liberal	Chris Nisiforou	**Victor Perton** (Lib)	
Dromana	Liberal	Kenneth Templar	Tony Hyams (Lib)	Irenee Orr (NLP)
Eltham	Labor	Alan Baker	Wayne Phillips (Lib)	Steve Davies (NLP); Bob West (Ind)
Essendon	Labor	Judy Maddigan	Ian Davis (Lib)	Rowena Allsop (Ind); John Bell (NLP); Geoff Ireland (Ind)
Evelyn	Liberal	Lydia MacMichael	**Jim Plowman** (Lib)	Rick Houlihan (Ind)
Footscray	Labor	Bruce Mildenhall	Chris MacGregor (Lib)	David Connolly (Ind); Colleen Hartland (Ind); Libby Krepp (Ind); Hans Paas (Ind)
Forest Hill	Liberal	Helen Zenkis	**John Richardson** (Lib)	
Frankston	Liberal	Rohan Cresp	**Graeme Weideman** (Lib)	Margaret Dawson (NLP); Judy Hale (Ind); Richard Hargrave (Ind)
Frankston East	Labor	**Jane Hill**	Peter McLellan (Lib)	Greg Graham (Ind); Ray Stirling (PCIRA); David Taylor (Ind); Mike Toldy (Ind)
Geelong	Labor	**Hayden Shell**	Ann Henderson (Lib)	Roger Kent (GCA)
Geelong North	Labor	Peter Loney	Jim Fidge (Lib)	Mae Dunstan (GCA)
Gippsland East	National	John Halloran	David Treasure (Nat)	Bruce Ellett (Ind); Ian Honey (Ind); Bob Lansbury (Ind); Roger Steedman (Ind)
Gippsland South	National	Brian Burleigh	Peter Ryan (Nat)	Roger Stephens (Ind); Vaughan Wareham (Ind)
Gippsland West	Liberal	Anwyn Martin	**Alan Brown** (Lib)	Trevor Witt (NLP)
Gisborne	Liberal	**Barry Rowe**	**Tom Reynolds** (Lib)	
Glen Waverley	Liberal	Ben Moon	**Ross Smith** (Lib)	Peter Olney (Ind)
Hawthorn	Liberal	Gordon McCaskie	**Phil Gude** (Lib)	Lorna Scurfield (NLP)
Ivanhoe	Labor	Chris Watson	**Vin Heffernan** (Lib)	Steve Griffith (NLP); K. H. Schuller (Ind); Steriani Vassis (Ind)
Keilor	Labor	**George Seitz**	Stephen Carter (Lib)	Jim Miller (Ind); Vanessa Wheeler (Ind)
Kew	Liberal	Wayne Clarke	**Jan Wade** (Lib)	Jonathan Shepherd (Ind)
Knox	Labor	**Carolyn Hirsh**	Hurtle Lupton (Lib)	Peter Herbert (Ind); Bill Johnson (Ind)
Malvern	Liberal	Anthony van der Craats	Robert Doyle (Lib)	Lesley Mendelson (NLP)
Melbourne	Labor	**Neil Cole**	Kate Nunan (Lib)	Tony Botsman (NLP); John Dobinson (Ind); Dave Holmes (Ind); Dean Reynolds (Ind); Bryce Vissel (Dem)
Melton	Labor	**David Cunningham**	Therese Samson (Lib)	Peter Taylor (Ind); David Toms (Ind)
Mildura	Liberal	John Zigouras	**Craig Bildstien** (Lib)	Tom Campbell (Ind)
Mill Park	Labor	**Alex Andrianopoulos**	Anthony Fernandez (Lib)	Christine Craik (Ind); Janko Georgievski (Ind)
Mitcham	Labor	**John Harrowfield**	**Roger Pescott** (Lib)	Gilbert Boffa (Ind)
Monbulk	Labor	**Neil Pope**	Steve McArthur (Lib)	John McLaren (Dem); Jenny Saulwick (Ind); Bill Watson (NLP)
Mooroolbark	Labor	Mike Welsh	Lorraine Elliott (Lib)	Robert Kendi (NLP); George Moran (Ind); Steve Raskovy (Ind)
Mordialloc	Labor	**Peter Spyker**	**Geoff Leigh** (Lib)	Klara Mitchell (Ind); Declan Stephenson (Ind)
Mornington	Liberal	Carlyle La'Brooy	**Robin Cooper** (Lib)	Jan Charlwood (NLP)
Morwell	Labor	**Keith Hamilton**	Martin Hill (Lib); **Tom Wallace** (Nat)	Martin Kirsch (NLP); Bill Mele (Ind); Barry Murphy (Ind)
Murray Valley	National	Maria Keller	**Ken Jasper** (Nat)	
Narracan	Liberal	Brendan Jenkins	**John Delzoppo** (Lib)	John Cross (Ind); Trisha Taig (Ind)
Niddrie	Labor	**Bob Sercombe**	David Davis (Lib)	Dorothy Costa (Ind); Maria Ferrigno (Ind); Sam Ortisi (Ind)
Northcote	Labor	**Tony Sheehan**	Nicholas Kotsiras (Lib)	Ken Cook (CTA); Michael Dickins (NLP); John Graham (Ind); Dimitrios Karmis (Ind); Joe Kenwright (Ind); Carolyn Purdue (Ind); Frank Ryan (Ind)
Oakleigh	Labor	**Race Mathews**	Denise McGill (Lib)	
Pakenham	Liberal	Roy Ashcroft	**Rob Maclellan** (Lib)	John Hannon (NLP); Gary Hipworth (Ind)
Pascoe Vale	Labor	**Kelvin Thomson**	Con Karavitis (Lib)	Anne Petrou (Ind); Cath Price (Ind)
Polwarth	Liberal	Fran Lehmann	**Ian Smith** (Lib)	
Portland	Liberal	Bill Sharrock	**Denis Napthine** (Lib)	
Prahran	Liberal	Cynthia Levey	**Don Hayward** (Lib)	Greg Broszczyk (NLP); Francesca Davidson (Grn)
Preston	Labor	**Michael Leighton**	George Prillwitz (Lib)	Justin Armstrong (Ind); Richard Barnes (NLP); Rose-Marie Celestin (Ind)
Richmond	Labor	**Demetri Dollis**	Peter Graham (Lib)	Larry Clarke (NLP); Steve Florin (Ind); Ray Fulcher (Ind); Barry Gration (Ind); Bill Hampson (Ind); Jason Maher (Ind); Gordon McQuilten (Dem); Geoff Millman (Ind); Sunny Seau (Ind)
Ripon	Liberal	Hilary Hunt	**Steve Elder** (Lib)	Gwenda Allgood (Ind)
Rodney	National	Jason Price	**Noel Maughan** (Nat)	Dennis Lacey (Ind)
Sandringham	Liberal	Roland Lindell	Murray Thompson (Lib)	Brian Gale (NLP)
Seymour	Liberal	Ian Rogers	Rod Henderson (Nat); Marie Tehan* (Lib)	Jim McKinnon (PCIRA); Maurie Smith (Ind)
Shepparton	National	John Sheen	**Don Kilgour** (Nat)	
South Barwon	Liberal	Frances Patrick	Alister Paterson (Lib)	Karan Dawson (GCA); **Harley Dickinson** (Ind); Gary Lyons (CTA)
Springvale	Labor	**Eddie Micallef**	Mario Dodic (Lib)	Lorna Stevenson (Ind)
Sunshine	Labor	**Ian Baker**	Bernard Reilly (Lib)	Marion Martin (Ind); Charles Skidmore (Ind); Z. A. Derwinski (Ind)
Swan Hill	National	Vera Alcock	**Barry Steggall** (Nat)	Geoff Burnside (Ind)
Thomastown	Labor	**Peter Batchelor**	Riza Kozanoglu (Lib)	Marianna Cuni (Ind); Christos Karamoshos (Ind); Ken Mantell (Ind); Jim Thomev (Ind)
Tullamarine	Labor	**Peter Gavin**	Bernie Finn (Lib)	Veronica Burgess (Ind); Andy Govanstone (Ind); Cheryl Hildebrandt (Ind); Jack Ogilvie (Ind)
Wantirna	Labor	Peter Lockwood	Kim Wells (Lib)	John Le Fevre (Ind)
Warrandyte	Liberal	Philip Moran	**Phil Honeywood** (Lib)	Neil Macdonald (Ind)
Warrnambool	National	William Thompson	**John McGrath** (Nat)	
Werribee	Labor	**Ken Coghill**	Anne Canterbury (Lib)	Shane Bourke (Ind)
Williamstown	Labor	**Joan Kirner**	Jeff Bird (Lib)	Daniel Cumming (Ind); Paul Holmes (Ind); Vern Hughes (Ind)
Wimmera	National	Felix Blatt	**Bill McGrath** (Nat)	
Yan Yean	Labor	Andre Haermeyer	Bill Willis (Lib)	Peter Brambilla (Ind); Eleonora Cichello (Ind); Trevor Goodwin (Ind); Nazio Mancini (Ind); Julie Nihill (NLP)

== Legislative Council ==
Sitting members are shown in bold text. Successful candidates are highlighted in the relevant colour. Where there is possible confusion, an asterisk (*) is also used.

Province	Held by	Labor candidates	Coalition candidates	DLP candidates	Other candidates
Ballarat	Liberal	Geoff Howard	**Dick de Fegely** (Lib)	Brian Lugar	
Central Highlands	Liberal	Janet Kaylock	Graeme Stoney (Lib)	Rosemary Maurus	
Chelsea	Labor	**Maureen Lyster**	Sue Wilding (Lib)	John Cass	Judith O'Dwyer (Ind)
Doutta Galla	Labor	**David White**	George Korytsky (Lib)	Gloria Brook	Glenn Campbell (Ind)
East Yarra	Liberal	Rosemary Barker	**Mark Birrell** (Lib)	Margaret Reed	
Eumemmerring	Labor	**Fred Van Buren**	Ron Wells (Lib)	Timothy Dodd	
Geelong	Labor	Jan Alen	Bill Hartigan (Lib)	Paul Cahill	**Rod Mackenzie** (GCA); Ian Winter (CTA)
Gippsland	Liberal	Judith Stone	Philip Davis (Lib)	Michael Rowe	Ben Buckley (Ind); Paul Newnham (Ind)
Higinbotham	Liberal	Thomas Hickie	Chris Strong (Lib)	Gail de Rozario	Edward Havard (NLP)
Jika Jika	Labor	Pat Power	Gregory Eade (Lib)	Leonard Moore	
Koonung	Labor	Sharon Ellis	Bruce Atkinson (Lib)	Peter Ferwerda	
Melbourne	Labor	Doug Walpole	**John Miles** (Lib)	John Mulholland	Ngaire Mason (NLP); Robert Stone (Dem)
Melbourne North	Labor	Don Nardella	Alice Collis (Lib)	Mark Beshara	
Melbourne West	Labor	**Jean McLean**	Trish Vejby (Lib)	Maurice Allen	Les Twentyman (Ind)
Monash	Liberal	Bunna Walsh	Louise Asher (Lib)	Robert Semmell	James Moffatt (Ind)
North Eastern	National	Ewan Paterson	**Bill Baxter** (Nat)	Pauline MacGibbon	
North Western	National	Bob Cameron	Barry Bishop (Nat)	Gavan Grimes	Elizabeth Cox (Ind)
Silvan	Liberal	Eugene O'Sullivan	**Rosemary Varty** (Lib)	Paul McCarthy	
South Eastern	Liberal	Chrys Abraham	Ron Bowden (Lib)	Pat Crea	Alan Shield (NLP)
Templestowe	Liberal	Desmond Johnson	Bill Forwood (Lib)	Valda McCarthy	Richard Fitzherbert (Ind)
Waverley	Labor	**Cyril Kennedy**	Andrew Brideson (Lib)	Matt Cody	Elizabeth Billing (Ind); Stephen Bingle (Ind)
Western	National	David Broderick	**Roger Hallam** (Nat)	Christine Dodd	
