= 1992 Victorian state election =

Australian state election

- 3 October 1992

All 88 seats in the Victorian Legislative Assembly and 22 (of the 44) seats in the Victorian Legislative Council 45 seats needed for a majority
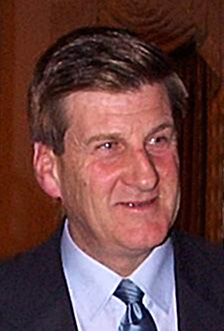

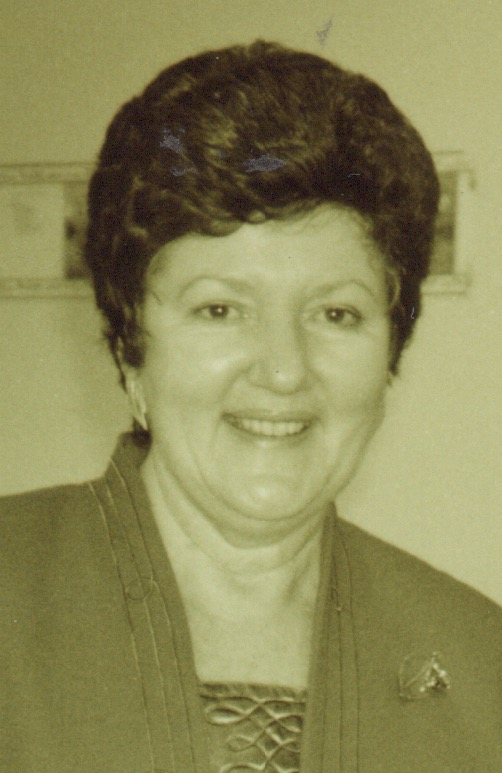
	First party	Second party
Leader	Jeff Kennett	Joan Kirner
Party	Liberal/National coalition	Labor
Leader since	23 April 1991	10 August 1990
Leader's seat	Burwood	Williamstown
Last election	42 seats	46 seats
Seats won	61	27
Seat change	▲19	▼19
Popular vote	1,358,295	1,003,495
Percentage	51.99%	38.41%
Swing	▲3.65	▼8.14
TPP	56.30%	43.70%
TPP swing	▲5.78	▼5.78
- Results in each electorate
Premier before election
Joan Kirner
Labor
Elected Premier
Jeff Kennett
Liberal/National coalition

The 1992 Victorian state election was held on 3 October 1992 to elect the 52nd Parliament of Victoria, including all 88 members of the Legislative Assembly and 22 of the 44 members in the Legislative Council.

The Labor government of Premier Joan Kirner, who had replaced John Cain on 10 August 1990, was defeated in a landslide by the Liberal–National Coalition led by Jeff Kennett and Pat McNamara, who had campaigned on comprehensive economic and structural reform as well as changes to industrial relations. It was the largest majority that the Coalition had ever won in Victoria.

== Background ==
At the 1988 state election, the Labor government had won a third term, gaining 46 of the 88 Legislative Assembly seats, but was sent reeling by a budget crisis. Despite this, polling indicated that the Liberal Opposition had been unable to gain any ground under Alan Brown, who had succeeded Jeff Kennett on 23 May 1989. Brown was, however, able to persuade the Nationals to agree to contest the next election as a Coalition, the first time the two main non-Labor parties in Victoria had fought an election together since 1950. The Liberals had actually won a majority of the two-party vote in 1988, but came up five seats short of achieving government. It was believed that they had lost seats due to a number of three-cornered contests in rural areas.

Cain soon realised that Labor would be heavily defeated if he took the party into the next election. He resigned in 1990, and was succeeded by Deputy Premier and Education Minister Joan Kirner. While Kirner was able to win some respect, she was unable to change Labor's fortunes. Prospects for a fourth Labor term became even more remote when Kennett's supporters launched a party room coup that returned him to the leadership on 23 April 1991.

Kirner waited as long as she could before calling the election. While she remained more personally popular than Kennett, commentators had almost universally written off Labor by this time. The Coalition had been well ahead in opinion polling for over two years, and it was obvious almost as soon as the writs were dropped that Kennett would be Victoria's next premier.

Both the government and opposition had gone through changes during the 1988–1992 term of Parliament. The Labor government, in power since the 1982 election, was dogged in its final term by a series of scandals and major corporate collapses which, like neighbouring South Australia, extended and deepened the early 1990s recession in those states. Unemployment reached 11.6% in Victoria in March 1992, with the manufacturing and textiles sector being particularly affected, while state debt was estimated at A$30 billion. The State Bank of Victoria, the Victorian Economic Development Corporation (VEDC), Tricontinental and Pyramid Building Society failed, whilst the government-backed WorkCare insurance scheme was not in good shape. Proposed changes to the system were rejected by trade unions, leading to a state wide strike which saw gas supplies, electricity generators, public transport, most schools and government offices inoperative. A disastrous rollout of a 'scratch ticket system' for metropolitan trains and trams did not help their fortunes. The Liberal party commenced an advertising campaign in January 1992 with the slogan "Labor: the Guilty Party".

The 1990 federal election was the first major sign that all was not well for Victorian Labor, with the Coalition gaining nine seats at Labor's expense. Ultimately, John Cain resigned on 7 August 1990, and on 10 August, Joan Kirner was elected leader. Despite her own personal popularity, support for the government had fallen to 22% by December, with analysts citing concerns over the state debt, lack of confidence in Victorian financial institutions, industrial relations problems and the severity of the recession's effects in the state as the primary reasons for the low ratings.

Meanwhile, on 23 May 1989, Jeff Kennett was dumped as leader of the Liberal Party by his colleagues in favour of Alan Brown; Brown led the party until 23 April 1991 when he was himself dumped in a party room spill. During Brown's period as Opposition Leader, the Liberals negotiated the first coalition agreement with the Nationals in over forty years, in part due to a belief by some (in spite of what political scientist Brian Costar called a "lack of psephological evidence to support this assertion") that had the parties been in coalition at the election, they would have won.

== Key dates ==
Date	Event
14 August 1992	The Legislative Council was prorogued and the Legislative Assembly was dissolved.
21 August 1992	Writs were issued by the Governor to proceed with an election.
28 August 1992	The electoral rolls were closed.
4 September 1992	Nominations for candidates for the election closed at noon.
3 October 1992	Polling day, between the hours of 8am and 6pm.
6 October 1992	The Kirner Ministry resigned and the Kennett Ministry was constituted.
19 October 1992	The writ was returned and the results formally declared.
27 October 1992	Parliament resumed for business.

== Results ==
=== Legislative Assembly ===
Party	Votes	%	+/–	Seats	+/–
Liberal	1,153,770	44.16	▲3.59	52	▲19
Labor	1,003,495	38.41	▼8.14	27	▼19
National	204,525	7.83	▲0.06	9	Steady
Natural Law	34,606	1.32	New	0	Steady
Geelong Community	12,247	0.47	New	0	Steady
Democrats	5,080	0.19	▼0.86	0	Steady
Pensioner and CIR	3,844	0.15	New	0	Steady
Greens	1,863	0.07	New	0	Steady
Call to Australia	1,143	0.04	▼1.01	0	Steady
Independents	192,314	7.36	▲4.58	–	Steady
Total	2,612,887	100.00	–	88	–
Valid votes	2,612,887	96.19			
Invalid/blank votes	103,401	3.81	▼0.08		
Total votes	2,716,288	100.00	–		
Registered voters/turnout	2,855,471	95.13	▲2.78		
Two-party-preferred
Liberal/National Coalition	1,467,990	56.30	▲5.78		
Labor	1,139,635	43.70	▼5.78		
Total	2,607,625	100.00	–		

=== Legislative Council ===
Results for the Legislative Council.

Victorian state election, 3 October 1992 Legislative Council
Enrolled voters	2,855,471				
Votes cast	2,718,936		Turnout	95.22	+2.89
Informal votes	111,627		Informal	4.11	–0.22
Summary of votes by party
Party	Primary votes	%	Swing	Seats won	Seats held
Liberal	1,133,951	43.49	–0.01	14	24
Labor	1,005,454	38.56	–9.57	5	14
National	227,850	8.74	+1.26	3	6
Democratic Labor	118,244	4.54	+4.54	0	0
Natural Law	16,216	0.62	+0.62	0	0
Geelong Community	14,586	0.56	+0.56	0	0
Democrats	8,197	0.31	+0.31	0	0
Call to Australia	2,168	0.08	–0.14	0	0
Independent	80,643	3.09	+2.42	0	0
Total	2,419,991			22	44
Two-party-preferred
Liberal/National	1,475,004	56.65	+6.10		
Labor	1,128,503	43.35	–6.10		

The Labor government was defeated by the Coalition, with the latter winning 61 seats of 88 contested in the Assembly on an 8% swing against the Government, and 17 of 22 in the council with a swing of over 9%. It was the second-largest defeat that a sitting government has ever suffered in Victoria. This did, however, represent a considerable improvement in the Government's stocks from the 22-25% indicated in opinion polls in 1990 and 1991. The Liberals made gains primarily in the eastern suburbs of Melbourne as well as provincial Victoria. Eight members of Kirner's cabinet were defeated.

The Liberals actually won 52 seats, enough for a majority in their own right. Although Kennett thus had no need for National support, the Coalition was retained.

== Maps ==
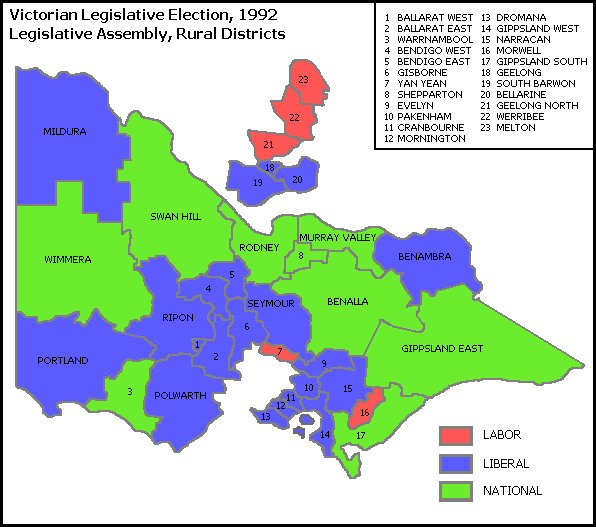

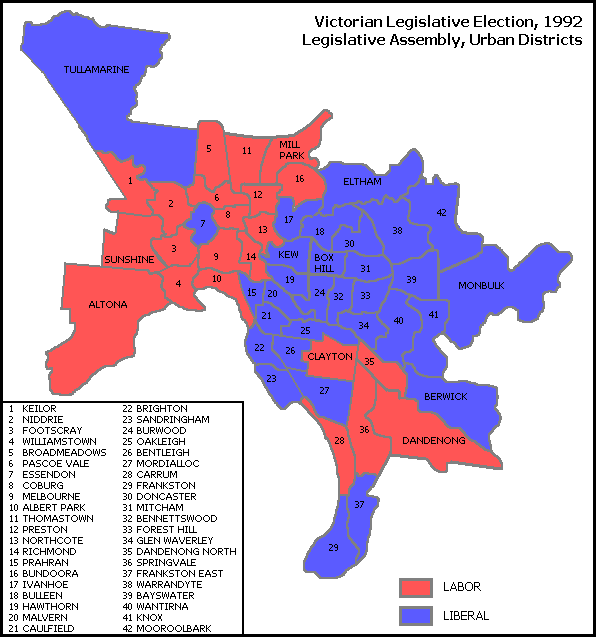

== Seats changing hands ==
Seat	Pre−1992			Swing	Post−1992		
Seat	Party	Member	Margin	Swing	Margin	Member	Party
Ballarat East	Labor	Frank Sheehan	−0.6*	−1.1	1.6	Barry Traynor	Liberal
Bayswater	Labor	Kay Setches	3.0	−10.1	7.1	Gordon Ashley	Liberal
Bellarine	Labor	Graham Ernst	−1.1	−6.8	7.9	Garry Spry	Liberal
Bendigo West	Labor	David Kennedy	1.6	−2.7	1.1	Max Turner	Liberal
Bentleigh	Labor	Ann Barker	1.5	−9.7	8.2	Inga Peulich	Liberal
Box Hill	Labor	Margaret Ray	−7.0	−6.2	13.2	Robert Clark	Liberal
Cranbourne	Labor	notional – new seat	1.4	−6.1	4.7	Gary Rowe	Liberal
Eltham	Labor	notional – new seat	4.6	−14.6	10.0	Wayne Phillips	Liberal
Essendon	Labor	Barry Rowe	5.5	−6.7	1.2	Ian Davis	Liberal
Frankston East	Labor	Jane Hill	6.5	−6.7	0.2	Peter McLellan	Liberal
Geelong	Labor	Hayden Shell	2.6	−3.3	0.7	Ann Henderson	Liberal
Knox	Labor	Carolyn Hirsh	5.0	−11.1	6.1	Hurtle Lupton	Liberal
Mitcham	Labor	John Harrowfield	2.3	−10.8	8.5	Roger Pescott	Liberal
Monbulk	Labor	Neil Pope	4.3	−9.6	5.3	Steve McArthur	Liberal
Mooroolbark	Labor	notional – new seat	1.9	−12.0	10.1	Lorraine Elliott	Liberal
Mordialloc	Labor	Peter Spyker	2.2	−9.5	7.3	Geoff Leigh	Liberal
Oakleigh	Labor	Race Mathews	5.7	−8.6	2.9	Denise McGill	Liberal
Tullamarine	Labor	Peter Gavin	4.9	−6.4	1.5	Bernie Finn	Liberal
Wantirna	Labor	Peter Lockwood	0.1	−14.2	14.1	Kim Wells	Liberal

- Ballarat East was the new name for the abolished district of Ballarat South, of which Labor MP Frank Sheehan was the sitting member. It was a notional Liberal seat.
- Bellarine and Box Hill became notional Liberal seats in the redistribution.

== See also ==
- Candidates of the 1992 Victorian state election
