= Arthur Drakeford Jr. =

Australian politician

Arthur Harold Finch Drakeford (8 February 1904 – 13 June 1959) was an Australian politician.

Drakeford was born in Benalla to Arthur Drakeford and Ellen Warrington. He was a fitter and turner on the railways before an eye injury led to him becoming a clerk. Around 1934 he married Violet Amelia Heldon, with whom he had two sons. Like his father he was active in the Labor Party, serving as president of the party's Essendon and West Coburg branches and secretary of the Pascoe Vale branch.

On 10 November 1945 Drakeford was elected to the Victorian Legislative Assembly as the member for Essendon, but he was defeated in 1947. He returned to the Assembly in 1955 as the member for Pascoe Vale; with that seat's abolition in 1958 he again contested Essendon, but was defeated. Drakeford died the following year in Carlton.

Victorian Legislative Assembly
Preceded by Samuel Merrifield	Member for Essendon; 1945–1947	Succeeded by Allen Bateman
New seat	Member for Pascoe Vale; 1955–1958	Abolished
