= Kenneth Wheeler (politician) =

Australian politician

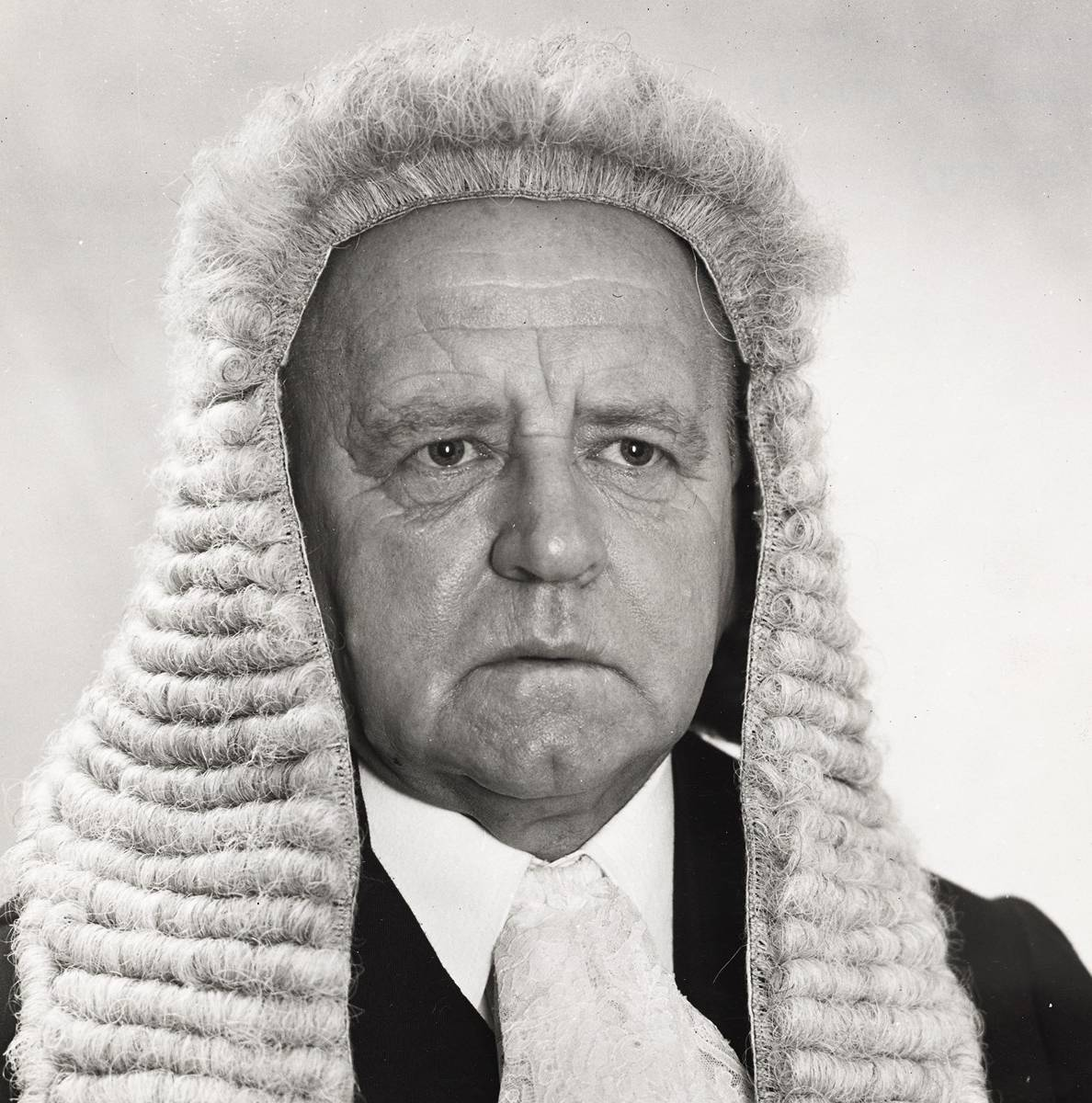
Parliamentary portrait

Sir Kenneth Henry Wheeler (7 September 1912 – 10 May 1996) was an Australian politician.

He was born in Mernda to farmer William Henry Wheeler and Alma Nellie Bodycoat. He worked on his father's farm from the age of thirteen, and then became a retail dairyman at Coburg 1934–1950. On 24 January 1934, he married Hazel Jean Collins, with whom he had two children. In 1950, he amalgamated his business with Croft Dairies, to form Metropolitan Dairies, of which he was manager in 1959–1970.

A Liberal Party member, he served on Coburg City Council from 1950 to 1959 and was mayor from 1955 to 1956. In 1958, he was elected to the Victorian Legislative Assembly as the member for Essendon. He was Speaker of the Victorian Legislative Assembly June 1973 – May 1979, and was knighted in 1976. Wheeler retired from politics in 1979, and died in 1996.

Victorian Legislative Assembly
Preceded by Sir Vernon Christie	Speaker of the Victorian Legislative Assembly; 1973–1979	Succeeded by Jim Plowman
New seat	Member for Essendon; 1958–1979	Succeeded by Barry Rowe
