= Justin Madden =

Australian rules footballer, born 1961

The Honourable Justin Madden AM

Member of the Victorian Legislative Assembly for Essendon
- In office 27 November 2010 – 29 November 2014
- Preceded by: Judy Maddigan
- Succeeded by: Danny Pearson

Minister for Planning
- In office 1 December 2006 – 2 December 2010
- Preceded by: Rob Hulls
- Succeeded by: Matthew Guy

Minister for Sport, Recreation and Commonwealth Games
- In office October 1999 – December 2006

Personal details
- Born: 31 May 1961 (age 65) Melbourne
- Party: Labor Party
- Education: Australian Catholic University (DipT); Royal Melbourne Institute of Technology (BArch)
- Profession: Teacher, architect, sportsman
- Website: justinmadden.org.au

Justin Mark Madden AM (born 31 May 1961) is a former Australian rules footballer and state politician. He played for both the Essendon Football Club and the Carlton Football Club in the Australian Football League (AFL).

After his retirement in 1997, Madden decided to enter Victorian politics, using the experience gained from his presidency of the AFL Players Association to run for candidacy as an Australian Labor Party member. He served in both the Victorian Legislative Assembly and Victorian Legislative Council before retiring from office in November 2014. Madden is also a registered architect in the State of Victoria.

== Early life ==
Madden was born in Melbourne, he attended Primary School at St Christopher's in Airport West and had his secondary schooling at St. Bernard's College in Essendon, a school renowned for its sporting prowess. He then studied teaching at the Institute of Catholic Education (now the Australian Catholic University).

His older brother Simon was also a footballer, playing for Essendon.

== VFL/AFL playing career ==
Justin Madden

Personal information
- Nickname: Harry
- Original team: Airport West
- Height: 206 cm (6 ft 9 in)
- Weight: 107 kg (236 lb)
- Position: Ruckman/Resting Forward

Playing career^{1}
Years	Club	Games (Goals)
1980–1982	Essendon	45 (20)
1983–1996	Carlton	287 (170)
Total		332 (190)
- ^{1} Playing statistics correct to the end of 1996.

Career highlights
- 2× AFL premiership player: (1987, 1995); 2× Robert Reynolds Trophy: (1985, 1991); All Australian: (1995)

Madden was still at college when he made his VFL senior debut in 1980 with the Essendon Football Club, where his older brother Simon was an established player. He graduated from college the following year and, in 1982, set about juggling the twin demands of teaching and football careers. In 1980 and 1981, Madden played 45 games for Essendon, but was concerned that he was not getting enough playing time, and transferred to Carlton part way through the 1983 VFL season. Standing at 206 centimetres (6 ft 9 in) tall, Madden was one of the tallest men ever to play Australian Rules football, and his potential in this area was fully utilized by Carlton, who used him as their main ruckman. Over the next fifteen seasons, Madden became a mainstay of the Carlton side, and one of the most recognizable players in the league, playing 287 games for the club. He was a member of their 1987 and 1995 premiership teams, and came within one vote of tying with Brad Hardie for the 1985 Brownlow Medal when he polled three votes in five consecutive games.

Madden retired from teaching in 1988, and in 1990, became President of the AFL Players Association, (taking over the role from his older brother Simon) while still playing for Carlton and at the peak of his career. In his seven-year tenure, which continued until his retirement, he oversaw the increasing professionalism of the game with the first players' collective bargaining agreement, and the expansion of the association to the point where it represented almost every eligible player in the entire league. Despite the increasing demands of AFL football, where most players were becoming professional players, Madden studied at Royal Melbourne Institute of Technology to become an architect. After graduating, he worked in this field while continuing to play football.

== Statistics ==
Legend
G	Goals	K	Kicks	D	Disposals	T	Tackles
B	Behinds	H	Handballs	M	Marks	H/O	Hit-outs

Season	Team	No.	Games	Totals								Averages (per game)								Votes
Season	Team	No.	Games	G	B	K	H	D	M	T	H/O	G	B	K	H	D	M	T	H/O	Votes
1980	Essendon	44	5	1	2	20	7	27	5	—N/a	79	0.2	0.4	4.0	1.4	5.4	1.0	—N/a	15.8	0
1981	Essendon	44	17	2	6	93	44	137	34	—N/a	436	0.1	0.4	5.5	2.6	8.1	2.0	—N/a	25.6	4
1982	Essendon	44	23	17	11	177	87	264	81	—N/a	631	0.7	0.5	7.7	3.8	11.5	3.5	—N/a	27.4	9
1983	Carlton	44	10	18	8	66	19	85	34	—N/a	133	1.8	0.8	6.6	1.9	8.5	3.4	—N/a	13.3	2
1984	Carlton	44	22	39	19	155	53	208	86	—N/a	339	1.8	0.9	7.0	2.4	9.5	3.9	—N/a	15.4	1
1985	Carlton	44	20	12	6	224	105	329	135	—N/a	275	0.6	0.3	11.2	5.3	16.5	6.8	—N/a	13.8	21
1986	Carlton	44	24	9	8	213	91	304	128	—N/a	477	0.4	0.3	8.9	3.8	12.7	5.3	—N/a	19.9	9
1987†	Carlton	44	23	20	10	184	111	295	99	15	415	0.9	0.4	8.0	4.8	12.8	4.3	0.7	18.0	7
1988	Carlton	44	22	12	7	165	107	272	122	9	380	0.5	0.3	7.5	4.9	12.4	5.5	0.4	17.3	5
1989	Carlton	44	19	5	6	168	70	238	90	15	327	0.3	0.3	8.8	3.7	12.5	4.7	0.8	17.2	11
1990	Carlton	44	19	7	3	165	96	261	78	11	346	0.4	0.2	8.7	5.1	13.7	4.1	0.6	18.2	8
1991	Carlton	44	22	4	3	170	149	319	109	19	419	0.2	0.1	7.7	6.8	14.5	5.0	0.9	19.0	8
1992	Carlton	44	14	3	1	135	59	194	65	5	194	0.2	0.1	9.6	4.2	13.9	4.6	0.4	13.9	7
1993	Carlton	44	22	12	5	171	139	310	93	22	363	0.5	0.2	7.8	6.3	14.1	4.2	1.0	16.5	11
1994	Carlton	44	24	21	8	163	105	268	84	19	358	0.9	0.3	6.8	4.4	11.2	3.5	0.8	14.9	12
1995†	Carlton	44	25	5	4	171	95	266	65	14	354	0.2	0.2	6.8	3.8	10.6	2.6	0.6	14.2	2
1996	Carlton	44	21	3	3	104	42	146	25	14	220	0.1	0.1	5.0	2.0	7.0	1.2	0.7	10.5	3
Career			332	190	110	2544	1379	3923	1333	143	5746	0.6	0.3	7.7	4.2	11.8	4.0	0.7	17.3	120

== Political career ==
After retiring from football in 1997, Madden continued to work as an architect. The Essendon and Carlton Football Clubs agreed to name future contests between the two clubs the Madden Cup, in honour of both the Madden brothers. By this time, Madden was also a life member at Carlton.

Madden's nomination as a Labor candidate for the Legislative Council seat of Doutta Galla Province in the leadup to the 1999 state election came as a surprise to many. However, he attained pre-selection, and was subsequently elected. When Labor won a surprise victory at the election, Madden found himself appointed Minister for Sport and Recreation, despite having no prior political experience. This was in spite of rumours that he had specifically requested not to be given Sport and Recreation, but instead had asked to be made responsible for Education. He was initially given the additional portfolio of Youth Affairs, but this was replaced with the Commonwealth Games after the 2002 election.

In the wake of reforms to the Legislative Council which cut the number of members, Madden was initially placed in danger of losing his pre-selection, but was saved by intervention from Premier Steve Bracks. This initially saw him pre-selected for the Legislative Assembly seat of Bundoora, vacated by former minister Sherryl Garbutt. However, after the sudden retirement of another former minister, Mary Delahunty, in Northcote, another deal was arranged which saw Madden instead remain in a safe position on the Legislative Council ticket. At the 2006 Victoria State election he was elected to the Legislative Council as a member for the Western Metropolitan Region.

In December 2006, he became the state's Minister of Planning. In early 2007, Madden criticised Victorians for building too many large homes. This statement became controversial after it was discovered Madden himself had a sprawling home and had in fact applied to renovate and conduct a major extension onto his home, thus creating much discussion on outspoken journalist Neil Mitchell's talk-back radio program on 3AW. The Minister has since completed his extensions and defended his statements.

Madden was a keynote speaker at the 2008 Metropolis Congress in Sydney October 2008. Madden addressed world mayors and industry leaders on urban development and Metropolitan Performance Management.

On 25 February 2010 the ABC revealed an email mistakenly sent from Mr Madden's office containing a media strategy document. The document included strategy for dealing with a proposed development: The document said the government would claim it consulted with the community on the plans to develop the Windsor hotel then block the proposal and say it did so because it listened to community views.

In the 2010 Victoria state election, when the Labor party was defeated, he moved from the Legislative Council and was elected to the Legislative Assembly seat of Essendon.

On 15 November 2013, Madden announced his intention to retire from politics at the next state election.

== See also ==
- List of Australian rules football families
