= James Dillon (Australian politician) =

Australian politician

James Chisholm Dillon (16 November 1880 – 27 February 1949) was an Australian politician.

Dillon was born in Bungaree to miner William Dillon and Isabella Chisholm. He attended state school at Ballarat East and then worked for the Victorian Railways. From 1908 he was an estate agent, and on 14 April 1909 he married Maggie Hilda McGregor, with whom he had a daughter. From 1910 to 1914 he was a railway signalman, and from 1915 to 1919 a time-keeper at Waranga Dam. A keen footballer and cricketer, he played for a Ballarat XI against MCC. In 1920 he moved to Essendon, and worked as secretary of the Master Carters' Association.

In 1932 Dillon was elected to the Victorian Legislative Assembly as the United Australia Party member for Essendon. He served until his defeat in April 1943. After leaving politics he continued as secretary of the Melbourne Washed Sands Company, and was also president of the transportation section of the Victorian Railways Union. Dillon died in Essendon in 1949.

Victorian Legislative Assembly
Preceded by Arthur Drakeford	Member for Essendon; 1932–1943	Succeeded by Samuel Merrifield
