= George Fewster =

Australian politician (1896–1970)

George Michael Harrington Fewster (6 December 1896 – 15 January 1970) was an Australian politician. He was a member of the Victorian Legislative Assembly for the electoral district of Essendon representing the Labor Party from 1950 to 1955 and the Australian Labor Party (Anti-Communist) (later the Democratic Labor Party) from March–April 1955. The Essendon electorate was abolished in 1955.

Although born in West Melbourne, Fewster grew up in the Melbourne suburb of Newport under the guidance of his father, William. Fewster completed his primary education at St. Joseph's CBC North Melbourne in 1911, aged fourteen, and the following year began work at the Newport Workshops as an apprentice. He went on to become a justice of the peace, an 'A' Grade Automotive engineer and a member of the Institute of Automotive and Aeronautical Engineers.
