= Samuel Merrifield =

Australian politician

Samuel Merrifield (6 February 1904 – 24 August 1982) was an Australian politician.

He was born at Moonee Ponds to carpenter William Merrifield and Sarah Semmens. He attended local state schools and Essendon High School, becoming a qualified surveyor in 1925. He worked with the Melbourne and Metropolitan Tramways Board until 1930, but was unemployed from 1931 to 1935 when he resumed his previous job. On 7 March 1936 he married Margaret Lillian Smith. After a brief stint with the State Electricity Commission he worked for the Department of the Interior from 1940 to 1943.

A Labor Party member from 1922, he was elected to the Victorian Legislative Assembly in 1943 as the member for Essendon. He transferred to Moonee Ponds in 1945, and from 1952 to 1955 was Minister of Public Works. He was defeated in 1955, and served on Keilor City Council from 1955 to 1958. In 1958 he was elected to the Victorian Legislative Council for Doutta Galla Province. He was deputy leader of the Labor Party in the Legislative Council from 1960 to 1970, when he retired from politics. Merrifield died at Parkville in 1982.

Victorian Legislative Assembly
Preceded by James Dillon	Member for Essendon; 1943–1945	Succeeded by Arthur Drakeford
New seat	Member for Moonee Ponds; 1945–1955	Succeeded by Jack Holden
Victorian Legislative Council
Preceded by Paul Jones	Member for Doutta Galla; 1958–1970; Served alongside: Bill Slater; John Tripovich	Succeeded by Dolph Eddy
