= Danny Pearson (politician) =

Australian politician

The Honourable Danny Pearson MP

Minister for Economic Growth and Jobs
- In office 19 December 2024 – 15 April 2026
- Premier: Jacinta Allan
- Preceded by: Tim Pallas (as Minister for Economic Growth); Natalie Hutchins (as Minister for Jobs and Industry)
- Succeeded by: Steve Dimopoulos

Minister for Finance
- In office 19 December 2024 – 15 April 2026
- Premier: Jacinta Allan
- Preceded by: Himself (as Assistant Treasurer)
- Succeeded by: Sonya Kilkenny

Assistant Treasurer
- In office 22 June 2020 – 19 December 2024
- Premier: Daniel Andrews; Jacinta Allan
- Preceded by: Robin Scott
- Succeeded by: Himself (as Minister for Finance)

Minister for Transport Infrastructure
- In office 2 October 2023 – 19 December 2024
- Premier: Jacinta Allan
- Preceded by: Jacinta Allan
- Succeeded by: Gabrielle Williams

Minister for the Suburban Rail Loop
- In office 2 October 2023 – 19 December 2024
- Premier: Jacinta Allan
- Preceded by: Jacinta Allan
- Succeeded by: Harriet Shing

Minister for Housing
- In office 27 June 2022 – 2 October 2023
- Premier: Daniel Andrews
- Preceded by: Richard Wynne
- Succeeded by: Harriet Shing

Minister for Government Services
- In office 18 December 2025 – 15 April 2026
- Premier: Jacinta Allan
- Preceded by: Natalie Hutchins
- Succeeded by: Ingrid Stitt
- In office 22 June 2020 – 2 October 2023
- Premier: Daniel Andrews; Jacinta Allan
- Preceded by: Position established
- Succeeded by: Gabrielle Williams

Minister for Regulatory Reform
- In office 22 June 2020 – 2 October 2023
- Premier: Daniel Andrews; Jacinta Allan
- Preceded by: Position established
- Succeeded by: Position abolished

Minister for WorkSafe and the TAC
- In office 5 December 2022 – 19 December 2024
- Premier: Daniel Andrews; Jacinta Allan
- Preceded by: Ingrid Stitt (as Minister for Workplace Safety)
- Succeeded by: Ben Carroll

Minister For Creative Industries
- In office 29 September 2020 – 27 June 2022
- Premier: Daniel Andrews
- Preceded by: Martin Foley
- Succeeded by: Steve Dimopoulos

Member of the Victorian Legislative Assembly for Essendon
- Incumbent
- Assumed office 29 November 2014
- Preceded by: Justin Madden
- Majority: 15.86%

Personal details
- Born: 15 February 1973 (age 53) Melbourne, Victoria, Australia
- Party: Labor
- Children: 5
- Education: University of Melbourne
- Occupation: Consultant; Political advisor
- Website: www.dannypearson.com.au

Daniel James Pearson (born 15 February 1973) is an Australian politician who has been a Labor Party member of the Victorian Legislative Assembly since November 2014, representing the Legislative Assembly seat of Essendon.

Pearson has served as a minister in two Victorian Labor Governments, for the Second Andrews Ministry and the current Allan Labor Government. Pearson currently holds two ministerial portfolios (Economic Growth and Jobs, and Finance).

Pearson is a member of the Australian Workers Union component of the Victorian Labor Right.

== Political career ==
=== Electoral history ===
Electoral history of Danny Pearson in the Parliament of Victoria
Year	Electorate	Party	First Preference Result				Two Candidate Result			
Year	Electorate	Party	Votes	%	+%	Position	Votes	%	+%	Result
2014	Essendon	Labor	16,026	40.9	+2.8	1st	22,988	58.7	+4.3	Elected
2018	Essendon	Labor	19,173	46.23	+5.33	1st	27,315	65.86	+7.20	Elected
2022	Essendon	Labor	17,196	41.1	−5.1	1st	26,146	62.5	−3.4	Elected

Victorian Legislative Assembly
Preceded by Justin Madden	Member for Essendon; 2014–present	Incumbent
Political offices
Preceded by Martin Foley	Minister for Creative Industries; 2020–2022	Succeeded by Steve Dimopoulos
New title	Minister for Regulatory Reform; 2020–present	Incumbent
New title	Minister for Government Services; 2020–present	Incumbent
Preceded by Robin Scott	Assistant Treasurer; 2020–present	Incumbent
Preceded by Richard Wynne	Minister for Housing; 2022–present	Incumbent
