= Allen Bateman =

Australian politician

Allen Robert Bateman (21 February 1904 – 12 August 1994) was an Australian politician.

Born in Launceston, Victoria, to carpenter Arthur Bateman and Ada Helen Alexander, he attended Napier St State School in Fitzroy before becoming a carpenter and grocery owner. On 18 September 1926 he married Violet Muriel Rogers, with whom he had two sons. From 1940 to 1945 he served in the Australian Imperial Force. He was elected to Coburg City Council in 1939 and served until 1952, including a period as mayor from 1946 to 1947. He was elected to the Victorian Legislative Assembly as the Liberal member for Essendon in 1947, but was defeated in 1950; he went on to serve as assistant general secretary of the Victorian Liberal Party from 1951 until 1971.
