= Electoral district of Essendon =

State electoral district of Victoria, Australia

Essendon Victoria—Legislative Assembly
- Interactive map of electoral district boundaries from the 2022 state election
- State: Victoria
- Dates current: 1904–1955; 1958–present
- MP: Danny Pearson
- Party: Labor Party
- Namesake: Essendon
- Electors: 48,427 (2018)
- Area: 24 km^{2} (9.3 sq mi)
- Demographic: Metropolitan
Electorates around Essendon:
Niddrie	Essendon	Pascoe Vale
Niddrie	Essendon	Pascoe Vale
Footscray	Melbourne	Brunswick

The electoral district of Essendon is an electoral district of the Victorian Legislative Assembly. It was first created in 1904 after the abolition of the larger Essendon and Flemington electorate, and covers some of the north-western suburbs of Melbourne, including Essendon, Moonee Ponds and Ascot Vale.

The electorate was abolished in 1955, replaced by Ascot Vale, but in 1958, Ascot Vale was abolished, replaced by a re-created Essendon.

Essendon was held by the Liberals during the Bolte and Hamer governments, usually due to preferences from the Democratic Labor Party. The Liberals also won the seat after the Kennett landslide of 1992.

Nowadays, the electorate lies within the Labor heartland of western and northern Melbourne, and is considered to be a relatively safe seat for Labor. Judy Maddigan regained the seat for Labor at the 1996 election and retained the seat until her retirement in 2010, when it was won by the then Labor MLC, Justin Madden.

Following the 2012–2013 redivision of State electoral boundaries, Essendon lost electors from Aberfeldie to the electoral district of Niddrie and gained electors from Flemington and Travancore in the electoral district of Melbourne.

The current member for Essendon is Danny Pearson of the Labor Party, who was elected to the seat at the 2014 state election. Pearson has announced he will not contest the 2026 Victorian election.

== Members for Essendon ==
First incarnation (1904–1955)
Member	Party	Term
William Watt	Liberal	1904–1914
Maurice Blackburn	Labor	1914–1917
Thomas Ryan	Nationalist	1917–1924
Frank Keane	Labor	1924–1927
Arthur Drakeford	Labor	1927–1932
James Dillon	United Australia	1932–1943
Samuel Merrifield	Labor	1943–1945
Arthur Drakeford Jr	Labor	1945–1947
Allen Bateman	Liberal	1947–1950
George Fewster	Labor	1950–1955
George Fewster	Labor (Anti-Communist)	1955

Second incarnation (1958–present)
Member	Party	Term
Sir Kenneth Wheeler	Liberal	1958–1979
Barry Rowe	Labor	1979–1992
Ian Davis	Liberal	1992–1996
Judy Maddigan	Labor	1996–2010
Justin Madden	Labor	2010–2014
Danny Pearson	Labor	2014–2026

== Election results ==
2022 Victorian state election: Essendon
Party	Candidate	Votes	%	±%
Labor	Danny Pearson	17,196	41.1	−5.1
Liberal	Angelo Baronessa	12,331	29.5	+1.9
Greens	Jared Prentis	6,344	15.1	−1.7
Victorian Socialists	Daniel Nair Dadich	1,951	4.7	+4.7
Animal Justice	Gayle Williams	1,173	2.8	+2.8
Reason	Nicholas Hope	1,018	2.4	+2.4
Freedom	David Wright	1,006	2.4	+2.4
Family First	Margaret Muir	848	2.0	+2.0
Total formal votes		41,867	96.0	+0.7
Informal votes		1,761	4.0	−0.7
Turnout		43,628	88.1	+0.1
Two-party-preferred result
Labor	Danny Pearson	26,146	62.5	−3.4
Liberal	Angelo Baronessa	15,721	37.5	+3.4
Labor hold		Swing	−3.4	

=== Graphical summary ===
Two-party-preferred vote results in Essendon View source data.
