= Judy Maddigan =

Australian politician

The Honourable Judy Maddigan

Speaker of the Victorian Legislative Assembly
- In office 25 February 2003 – 20 December 2006
- Preceded by: Alex Andrianopoulos
- Succeeded by: Jenny Lindell

Member of the Victorian Legislative Assembly for Essendon
- In office 30 March 1996 – 26 November 2010
- Preceded by: Ian Davis
- Succeeded by: Justin Madden

Personal details
- Born: Judith Marilyn Todd; 3 February 1948 (age 78) Melbourne, Victoria, Australia
- Party: Labor Party
- Education: Tintern Grammar
- Alma mater: University of Melbourne
- Occupation: Librarian

Judith Marilyn Maddigan (née Todd; born 3 February 1948), Australian politician, was Speaker of the Victorian Legislative Assembly from 2003 to 2005. She was the member for the seat of Essendon from 1996 to 2010, representing the Labor Party.

Maddigan was born in Melbourne, and was educated at Tintern Grammar and the University of Melbourne. She was a librarian before entering politics. She was the first woman Speaker of the Legislative Assembly. She was inducted onto the Victorian Honour Roll of Women in 2001.

Victorian Legislative Assembly
Preceded by Ian Davis	Member for Essendon; 1996–2010	Succeeded by Justin Madden
Political offices
Preceded by Alex Andrianopoulos	Speaker of the Victorian Legislative Assembly; 2003–2006	Succeeded by Jenny Lindell
