= Wayne Phillips (politician) =

Australian politician (born 1952)

Wayne Phillips (born 28 March 1952) is an Australian politician. He was the Liberal member for Eltham in the Victorian Legislative Assembly from 3 October 1992 - 29 November 2002.

Phillips was born in Melbourne, and attended North Brunswick State School (until 1957) and Moreland High School (until 1963). He qualified as a butcher at William Angliss Trade School and was apprenticed in 1967. In 1973 he acquired a general store, which he managed until 1975 when he ran a nursery. From 1987 until 1992 he was a primary producer. He joined the Liberal Party in 1987, and in the 1990 federal election ran for the safe Labor seat of Scullin. He was a Diamond Valley Shire Councillor 1980–94, and was President 1987–88.

In 1992, Phillips was elected to the Victorian Legislative Assembly as the member for the new seat of Eltham, which had a notional Labor majority. Phillips served until his defeat in 2002 by Labor candidate Steve Herbert.

In 2005 Phillips was elected to Banyule City Council, representing Beale Ward. In January 2014, Philips was accused of 'buying votes' in his role as a Banyule Councillor, for using his discretionary Ward Fund to fund a proposed capital works project in another Councillors ward.

In February 2014, Phillips was the subject of a cruelty complaint to the RSPCA and the Victorian Department of Environment and Primary Industries regarding the condition of a herd of 6,000 goats on his property in Wollert, north of Melbourne. The Department of Environment and Primary Industries attended the property and were satisfied with changes Cr Phillips had put in place and the welfare of the goats.

Parliament of Victoria
Preceded by New seat	Member for Eltham; 1992–2002	Succeeded by Steve Herbert
