= Barry Rowe =

Australian politician

Barry John Rowe (born 15 October 1945) is a former Australian politician.

Rowe was born in Melbourne, and attended St Bernard's College in Moonee Ponds and then Monash University, where he received a Bachelor of Economics, and Hawthorn State College, where he received a Diploma of Education. He worked as a personnel officer, and joined the Labor Party in 1969, becoming president of the Moonee Ponds and Strathmore branches. He served on Essendon City Council from 1973 to 1979 and as mayor from 1976 to 1977; he also worked as an economics lecturer at the Royal Melbourne Institute of Technology from 1976 to 1979.

In 1979 Rowe was elected to the Victorian Legislative Assembly as the member for Essendon. He was Minister for Agriculture and Rural Affairs from 9 February 1989 to 18 January 1991 and Minister for Small Business from January to April 1991. In 1992, following a redistribution, he contested Gisborne, but was defeated.

Victorian Legislative Assembly
Preceded by Sir Kenneth Wheeler	Member for Essendon; 1979–1992	Succeeded by Ian Davis
