= Ian Davis (politician) =

Australian politician

George Ian Davis (7 February 1939 – 25 February 2016) was an Australian politician.

He was born in Melbourne to George Davis and Viola, née Jackson. After attending South West Brunswick State School and Melbourne Church of England Grammar School, he received an Associate Diploma in Communications from the Royal Melbourne Institute of Technology. He worked as an engineer in 1961 before becoming sales manager with George Davis Glass, his father's firm, becoming partner in 1973 and managing director in 1981. In 1987 he became managing director of GBL Services Pty Ltd and Royston Holdings Pty Ltd. A member of the Liberal Party since 1973, he was elected to the Victorian Legislative Assembly in 1992 as the member for Essendon, but he was defeated in 1996.

Victorian Legislative Assembly
Preceded by Barry Rowe	Member for Essendon; 1992–1996	Succeeded by Judy Maddigan
