= Results of the 1952 Victorian state election (Legislative Assembly) =

Australian state election results

Victorian state election, 6 December 1952 Legislative Assembly << 1950–1955 >>
Enrolled voters	1,119,486				
Votes cast	1,047,671		Turnout	93.58	−0.82
Informal votes	18,991		Informal	1.81	+0.67
Summary of votes by party
Party	Primary votes	%	Swing	Seats	Change
Labor	504,773	49.07	+3.78	37	+13
Liberal and Country	255,685	24.85	−15.84	11	−16
Electoral Reform League	98,641	9.59	+9.59	4	+4
Country	85,843	8.34	−2.30	12	−1
Independent	71,068	6.90	+4.04	1	±0
Total	1,028,680			65	
Two-party-preferred
Labor	734,668	56.7	+6.3		
Liberal and Country	560,521	43.3	–6.3		

This is a list of electoral district results for the Victorian 1952 election.

== Results by electoral district ==
=== Albert Park ===
1952 Victorian state election: Albert Park
Party	Candidate	Votes	%	±%
Labor	Keith Sutton	12,985	65.7	+14.4
Liberal and Country	Desmond Byrne	6,770	34.3	−14.4
Total formal votes		19,755	97.9	−2.0
Informal votes		417	2.1	+2.0
Turnout		20,172	90.5	−0.2
Labor hold		Swing	+14.4	

=== Allandale ===
1952 Victorian state election: Allandale
Party	Candidate	Votes	%	±%
Country	Russell White	7,620	51.1	+17.0
Labor	Patrick Denigan	7,277	48.9	+5.8
Total formal votes		14,897	98.8	−0.5
Informal votes		183	1.2	+0.5
Turnout		15,080	94.7	−1.0
Country hold		Swing	−4.2	

=== Ballarat ===
1952 Victorian state election: Ballarat
Party	Candidate	Votes	%	±%
Labor	John Sheehan	11,042	54.0	+7.2
Liberal and Country	William Roff	9,424	46.0	−7.2
Total formal votes		20,466	99.0	−0.2
Informal votes		211	1.0	+0.2
Turnout		20,677	96.2	−0.6
Labor gain from Liberal and Country		Swing	+7.2	

=== Barwon ===
1952 Victorian state election: Barwon
Party	Candidate	Votes	%	±%
Liberal and Country	Thomas Maltby	8,483	51.7	−48.3
Labor	Charles Plummer	7,915	48.3	+48.3
Total formal votes		16,398	99.0	
Informal votes		172	1.0	
Turnout		16,570	93.8	
Liberal and Country hold		Swing	N/A	

=== Benalla ===
1952 Victorian state election: Benalla
Party	Candidate	Votes	%	±%
Country	Frederick Cook	unopposed		
Country hold		Swing		

=== Benambra ===
1952 Victorian state election: Benambra
Party	Candidate	Votes	%	±%
Country	Tom Mitchell	7,241	57.3	−16.7
Labor	Geoffrey Holland	5,386	42.7	+42.7
Total formal votes		12,627	98.9	+1.0
Informal votes		139	1.1	−1.0
Turnout		12,766	90.9	−1.3
Country hold		Swing	N/A	

=== Bendigo ===
1952 Victorian state election: Bendigo
Party	Candidate	Votes	%	±%
Labor	Bill Galvin	unopposed		
Labor hold		Swing		

=== Borung ===
1952 Victorian state election: Borung
Party	Candidate	Votes	%	±%
Liberal and Country	Wilfred Mibus	8,174	61.9	+5.5
Labor	Lionel Reid	5,030	38.1	+38.1
Total formal votes		13,204	99.3	+0.2
Informal votes		99	0.7	−0.2
Turnout		13,303	95.6	−0.5
Liberal and Country hold		Swing	N/A	

=== Box Hill ===
1952 Victorian state election: Box Hill
Party	Candidate	Votes	%	±%
Labor	Bob Gray	17,661	52.2	+7.6
Liberal and Country	George Reid	12,987	38.3	−17.1
Independent	Thomas Mullett	3,218	9.5	+9.5
Total formal votes		33,866	98.4	−0.8
Informal votes		560	1.6	+0.8
Turnout		34,426	93.4	−1.0
Two-party-preferred result
Labor	Bob Gray	18,305	54.0	+9.4
Liberal and Country	George Reid	15,561	46.0	−9.4
Labor gain from Liberal and Country		Swing	+9.4	

=== Brighton ===
1952 Victorian state election: Brighton
Party	Candidate	Votes	%	±%
Electoral Reform	Ray Tovell	12,167	48.2	+48.2
Independent	Allistair Bruce	5,786	22.9	+22.9
Liberal and Country	Raymond Trickey	4,874	19.3	−80.7
Independent	Grace Stratton	1,244	4.9	+4.9
Independent	Finlay Julyan	1,174	4.7	+4.7
Total formal votes		25,245	97.6	
Informal votes		631	2.4	
Turnout		25,876	94.0	
Two-candidate-preferred result
Electoral Reform	Ray Tovell	15,729	62.3	+62.3
Independent	Allistair Bruce	9,516	37.7	+37.7
Electoral Reform gain from Liberal and Country		Swing	N/A	

=== Brunswick ===
1952 Victorian state election: Brunswick
Party	Candidate	Votes	%	±%
Labor	Peter Randles	unopposed		
Labor hold		Swing		

=== Camberwell ===
1952 Victorian state election: Camberwell
Party	Candidate	Votes	%	±%
Labor	Florence Rodan	8,664	32.9	−2.0
Liberal and Country	Robert Whately	7,084	26.9	−38.2
Electoral Reform	Vernon Wilcox	5,564	21.1	+21.1
Independent	Reginald Cooper	5,046	19.1	+19.1
Total formal votes		26,358	97.8	−1.5
Informal votes		599	2.2	+1.5
Turnout		26,957	94.2	+0.5
Two-party-preferred result
Liberal and Country	Robert Whately	15,472	58.7	−6.4
Labor	Florence Rodan	10,886	41.3	+6.4
Liberal and Country hold		Swing	−6.4	

=== Carlton ===
1952 Victorian state election: Carlton
Party	Candidate	Votes	%	±%
Labor	Bill Barry	18,152	91.9	+17.6
Communist	John Prescott	1,597	8.1	+8.1
Total formal votes		26,358	97.8	−0.4
Informal votes		599	2.2	+0.4
Turnout		26,957	94.2	+0.5
Labor hold		Swing	N/A	

=== Caulfield ===
1952 Victorian state election: Caulfield
Party	Candidate	Votes	%	±%
Electoral Reform	Alexander Dennett	12,492	62.6	+62.6
Independent Labor	Robert Flanagan	7,273	37.4	+37.4
Total formal votes		19,965	97.8	−1.3
Informal votes		443	2.2	+1.3
Turnout		20,408	91.6	−0.1
Electoral Reform gain from Liberal and Country		Swing	N/A	

=== Clifton Hill ===
1952 Victorian state election: Clifton Hill
Party	Candidate	Votes	%	±%
Labor	Joseph O'Carroll	unopposed		
Labor hold		Swing		

=== Coburg ===
1952 Victorian state election: Coburg
Party	Candidate	Votes	%	±%
Progressive Labor	Charlie Mutton	12,617	53.6	+20.8
Labor	Kevin Hayes	10,927	46.4	+7.4
Total formal votes		23,544	98.3	−0.7
Informal votes		404	1.7	+0.7
Turnout		23,948	94.1	−1.6
Progressive Labor hold		Swing	−4.4	

=== Collingwood ===
1952 Victorian state election: Collingwood
Party	Candidate	Votes	%	±%
Labor	Bill Towers	unopposed		
Labor hold		Swing		

=== Dandenong ===
1952 Victorian state election: Dandenong
Party	Candidate	Votes	%	±%
Labor	Les Coates	23,350	55.4	+5.6
Electoral Reform	William Dawnay-Mould	14,609	34.7	+34.7
Independent Liberal	Walter Peterson	3,439	8.2	+8.2
Communist	Arthur O'Donoghue	742	1.8	+1.8
Total formal votes		42,120	97.9	−1.2
Informal votes		888	2.1	+1.2
Turnout		43,028	94.1	−0.5
Two-candidate-preferred result
Labor	Les Coates	24,362	57.8	+8.0
Electoral Reform	William Dawnay-Mould	17,778	42.2	+42.2
Labor gain from Liberal and Country		Swing	N/A	

=== Dundas ===
1952 Victorian state election: Dundas
Party	Candidate	Votes	%	±%
Labor	Bob McClure	8,165	55.1	+13.1
Liberal and Country	William McDonald	6,646	44.9	−2.5
Total formal votes		14,811	99.2	0.0
Informal votes		123	0.8	0.0
Turnout		14,934	96.9	+0.9
Labor gain from Liberal and Country		Swing	+11.1	

=== Elsternwick ===
1952 Victorian state election: Elsternwick
Party	Candidate	Votes	%	±%
Labor	John Maynes	8,453	42.4	+3.2
Electoral Reform	John Don	8,389	42.1	+42.1
Independent	Andrew Sinclair	3,075	15.4	+15.4
Total formal votes		19,917	98.2	−1.1
Informal votes		370	1.8	+1.1
Turnout		20,287	94.5	+1.3
Two-candidate-preferred result
Electoral Reform	John Don	11,152	55.5	+55.5
Labor	John Maynes	8,865	44.5	+5.3
Electoral Reform gain from Liberal and Country		Swing	N/A	

=== Essendon ===
1952 Victorian state election: Essendon
Party	Candidate	Votes	%	±%
Labor	George Fewster	19,808	64.2	+15.1
Liberal and Country	Kenneth Wheeler	8,279	26.8	−19.4
Henry George Justice	Lancelot Hutchinson	2,765	9.0	+9.0
Total formal votes		30,852	98.4	−0.6
Informal votes		485	1.6	+0.6
Turnout		31,337	94.4	−0.9
Two-party-preferred result
Labor	George Fewster	20,085	65.1	+13.8
Liberal and Country	Kenneth Wheeler	10,767	34.9	−13.8
Labor hold		Swing	+13.8	

=== Evelyn ===
1952 Victorian state election: Evelyn
Party	Candidate	Votes	%	±%
Labor	Phillip Connell	8,465	48.8	+14.4
Liberal and Country	Roland Leckie	6,589	38.0	−15.8
Electoral Reform	Lindsay Gown	1,477	8.5	+8.5
Independent	Lyndhurst Mullett	822	4.7	+4.7
Total formal votes		17,353	98.3	−0.5
Informal votes		304	1.7	+0.5
Turnout		17,657	92.8	−0.5
Two-party-preferred result
Labor	Phillip Connell	9,044	52.1	+7.1
Liberal	Roland Leckie	8,309	47.9	−7.1
Labor gain from Liberal and Country		Swing	+7.1	

=== Footscray ===
1952 Victorian state election: Footscray
Party	Candidate	Votes	%	±%
Labor	Jack Holland	18,969	93.3	+20.6
Communist	Francis Johnson	1,362	6.7	+1.1
Total formal votes		20,331	96.3	−2.1
Informal votes		781	3.7	+2.1
Turnout		21,112	90.3	−4.0
Labor hold		Swing	N/A	

=== Geelong ===
1952 Victorian state election: Geelong
Party	Candidate	Votes	%	±%
Labor	James Dunn	13,684	69.8	+13.9
Liberal and Country	Geoffrey Thom	5,929	30.2	−13.9
Total formal votes		19,613	98.9	−0.7
Informal votes		215	1.1	+0.7
Turnout		19,828	93.3	−1.8
Labor hold		Swing	+13.9	

=== Gippsland East ===
1952 Victorian state election: Gippsland East
Party	Candidate	Votes	%	±%
Country	Albert Lind	unopposed		
Country hold		Swing		

=== Gippsland North ===
1952 Victorian state election: Gippsland North
Party	Candidate	Votes	%	±%
Labor	Hector Stoddart	8,840	52.5	+4.2
Country	Bill Fulton	7,992	47.5	+16.1
Total formal votes		16,832	99.0	−0.1
Informal votes		169	1.0	+0.1
Turnout		17,001	92.4	+0.1
Labor gain from Country		Swing	+2.9	

=== Gippsland South ===
1952 Victorian state election: Gippsland South
Party	Candidate	Votes	%	±%
Country	Herbert Hyland	9,899	55.1	−21.5
Labor	Sydney Crofts	8,071	44.9	+44.9
Total formal votes		17,970	99.0	−1.7
Informal votes		169	1.0	+1.7
Turnout		18,150	93.8	−1.3
Country hold		Swing	N/A	

=== Gippsland West ===
1952 Victorian state election: Gippsland West
Party	Candidate	Votes	%	±%
Country	Leslie Cochrane	6,989	45.3	+3.6
Labor	Thomas Holland	5,574	36.2	+36.2
Liberal and Country	Mac Steward	2,857	18.5	−22.6
Total formal votes		15,420	98.6	+0.9
Informal votes		215	1.4	−0.9
Turnout		15,635	94.2	+0.3
Two-party-preferred result
Country	Leslie Cochrane	9,293	60.3	+6.9
Labor	Thomas Holland	6,127	39.7	+39.7
Country hold		Swing	N/A	

=== Glen Iris ===
1952 Victorian state election: Glen Iris
Party	Candidate	Votes	%	±%
Electoral Reform	Thomas Hollway	15,152	56.4	+56.4
Liberal and Country	Les Norman	10,727	39.9	−26.6
Communist	Ian Turner	971	3.6	+3.6
Total formal votes		26,850	97.9	−1.4
Informal votes		585	2.1	+1.4
Turnout		27,435	94.7	0.0
Two-candidate-preferred result
Electoral Reform	Thomas Hollway	15,638	58.2	+58.2
Liberal and Country	Les Norman	11,212	41.8	−24.7
Electoral Reform gain from Liberal and Country		Swing	N/A	

=== Goulburn ===
1952 Victorian state election: Goulburn
Party	Candidate	Votes	%	±%
Labor	Joseph Smith	8,478	62.5	+12.6
Liberal and Country	John Roberts	5,087	37.5	0.0
Total formal votes		13,565	99.0	−0.6
Informal votes		133	1.0	+0.6
Turnout		13,698	93.6	−1.1
Labor hold		Swing	+10.3	

=== Grant ===
1952 Victorian state election: Grant
Party	Candidate	Votes	%	±%
Labor	Leslie D'Arcy	10,678	60.3	+14.8
Liberal and Country	Alexander Fraser	6,498	36.7	+5.2
Independent	Thomas Fynmore	541	3.0	+3.0
Total formal votes		17,717	98.6	−0.4
Informal votes		251	1.4	+0.4
Turnout		17,968	92.9	+0.5
Two-party-preferred result
Labor	Leslie D'Arcy	10,948	61.8	+12.6
Liberal and Country	Alexander Fraser	6,169	38.2	−12.6
Labor gain from Liberal and Country		Swing	+12.6	

=== Hampden ===
1952 Victorian state election: Hampden
Party	Candidate	Votes	%	±%
Labor	Robert Balcombe	6,703	48.0	+5.2
Liberal and Country	Henry Bolte	6,358	45.6	−11.6
Independent	Keith McGarvie	891	6.4	+6.4
Total formal votes		13,952	98.6	−0.5
Informal votes		192	1.4	+0.5
Turnout		14,144	94.7	−0.7
Two-party-preferred result
Liberal and Country	Henry Bolte	7,012	50.3	−6.9
Labor	Robert Balcombe	6,940	49.7	+6.9
Liberal and Country hold		Swing	−6.9	

=== Hawthorn ===
1952 Victorian state election: Hawthorn
Party	Candidate	Votes	%	±%
Labor	Charles Murphy	9,948	48.7	+6.8
Liberal and Country	Les Tyack	6,813	33.3	−6.5
Electoral Reform	Charles Calderwood	3,677	18.0	+18.0
Total formal votes		20,438	98.0	−1.1
Informal votes		409	2.0	+1.1
Turnout		20,847	94.2	+0.5
Two-party-preferred result
Labor	Charles Murphy	10,940	53.5	+7.8
Liberal and Country	Les Tyack	9,498	46.5	−7.8
Labor gain from Liberal and Country		Swing	+7.8	

=== Ivanhoe ===
1952 Victorian state election: Ivanhoe
Party	Candidate	Votes	%	±%
Labor	Michael Lucy	14,800	44.0	+2.4
Independent	Reginald Leonard	9,058	26.9	+26.9
Liberal and Country	Frank Block	8,424	25.0	−33.4
Electoral Reform	Harcourt Bell	1,372	4.1	+4.1
Total formal votes		33,654	98.2	−1.1
Informal votes		606	1.8	+1.1
Turnout		34,260	94.8	+0.7
Two-party-preferred result
Labor	Michael Lucy	18,069	53.5	+11.9
Liberal and Country	Frank Block	15,585	46.5	−11.9
Labor gain from Liberal and Country		Swing	+11.9	

=== Kew ===
1952 Victorian state election: Kew
Party	Candidate	Votes	%	±%
Liberal and Country	Arthur Rylah	7,780	37.4	−62.6
Labor	Norman Williams	6,696	32.2	+32.2
Electoral Reform	John Eddy	6,303	30.3	+30.3
Total formal votes		20,779	98.0	
Informal votes		418	2.0	
Turnout		21,197	93.3	
Two-party-preferred result
Liberal and Country	Arthur Rylah	13,076	62.9	−37.1
Labor	Norman Williams	7,703	37.1	+37.1
Liberal and Country hold		Swing	N/A	

=== Korong ===
1952 Victorian state election: Korong
Party	Candidate	Votes	%	±%
Liberal and Country	Keith Turnbull	4,359	36.2	−0.4
Labor	Campbell Turnbull	3,892	32.4	−0.3
Country	Frank Coghill	3,371	28.0	−2.7
Electoral Reform	Wallace Lunn	409	3.4	+3.4
Total formal votes		12,031	99.0	−0.3
Informal votes		125	1.0	+0.3
Turnout		12,156	95.2	−0.2
Two-party-preferred result
Liberal and Country	Keith Turnbull	7,332	60.9	+0.5
Labor	Campbell Turnbull	4,699	39.1	−0.5
Liberal and Country hold		Swing	+0.5	

=== Malvern ===
1952 Victorian state election: Malvern
Party	Candidate	Votes	%	±%
Liberal and Country	Trevor Oldham	7,081	36.5	−21.4
Labor	Francis Gaffy	6,589	33.9	+0.8
Electoral Reform	Roy Schilling	3,956	20.4	+20.4
Independent	Mascotte Brown	1,788	9.2	+0.1
Total formal votes		19,414	97.6	−1.0
Informal votes		475	2.4	+1.0
Turnout		19,889	92.0	−0.7
Two-party-preferred result
Liberal and Country	Trevor Oldham	11,487	59.2	−5.9
Labor	Francis Gaffy	7,927	40.8	+5.9
Liberal and Country hold		Swing	−5.9	

=== Melbourne ===
1952 Victorian state election: Melbourne
Party	Candidate	Votes	%	±%
Labor	Tom Hayes	unopposed		
Labor hold		Swing		

=== Mentone ===
1952 Victorian state election: Mentone
Party	Candidate	Votes	%	±%
Labor	George White	20,870	62.5	+11.4
Liberal and Country	Charles Bridgford	12,538	37.5	−11.4
Total formal votes		33,408	98.6	−0.7
Informal votes		467	1.4	+0.7
Turnout		33,875	94.0	−0.5
Labor hold		Swing	+11.4	

=== Mernda ===
1952 Victorian state election: Mernda
Party	Candidate	Votes	%	±%
Labor	Edmund Morrissey	8,694	50.9	−9.8
Liberal	Arthur Ireland	8,389	49.1	+9.8
Total formal votes		17,083	98.5	+3.2
Informal votes		259	1.5	−3.2
Turnout		17,342	92.5	−0.2
Labor gain from Liberal and Country		Swing	+9.8	

=== Midlands ===
1952 Victorian state election: Midlands
Party	Candidate	Votes	%	±%
Labor	Clive Stoneham	unopposed		
Labor hold		Swing		

=== Mildura ===
1952 Victorian state election: Mildura
Party	Candidate	Votes	%	±%
Labor	Alan Lind	6,860	51.1	+3.9
Country	Nathaniel Barclay	6,573	48.9	+12.1
Total formal votes		13,433	99.0	+0.1
Informal votes		133	1.0	−0.1
Turnout		13,566	95.4	+0.8
Labor gain from Country		Swing	+1.6	

=== Moonee Ponds ===
1952 Victorian state election: Moonee Ponds
Party	Candidate	Votes	%	±%
Labor	Samuel Merrifield	unopposed		
Labor hold		Swing		

=== Mornington ===
1952 Victorian state election: Mornington
Party	Candidate	Votes	%	±%
Labor	Norman Parker	7,970	41.2	+13.6
Liberal and Country	William Leggatt	7,162	37.0	−22.5
Electoral Reform	Gerard Hirst	2,918	15.1	+15.1
Independent	Morton Moyes	1,317	6.8	+6.8
Total formal votes		19,367	98.2	−0.8
Informal votes		350	1.8	+0.8
Turnout		19,717	93.0	0.0
Two-party-preferred result
Liberal and Country	William Leggatt	10,858	56.1	−13.7
Labor	Norman Parker	8,509	43.9	+13.7
Liberal and Country hold		Swing	−13.7	

=== Murray Valley ===
1952 Victorian state election: Murray Valley
Party	Candidate	Votes	%	±%
Labor	William Findlay	6,846	44.8	+7.5
Country	George Moss	6,617	43.3	+4.1
Liberal and Country	James Mosbey	1,820	11.9	−11.6
Total formal votes		15,283	98.9	−0.3
Informal votes		171	1.1	+0.3
Turnout		15,454	93.9	−1.6
Two-party-preferred result
Country	George Moss	7,996	52.3	−6.9
Labor	William Findlay	7,287	47.7	+6.9
Country hold		Swing	−6.9	

=== Northcote ===
1952 Victorian state election: Northcote
Party	Candidate	Votes	%	±%
Labor	John Cain	unopposed		
Labor hold		Swing		

=== Oakleigh ===
1952 Victorian state election: Oakleigh
Party	Candidate	Votes	%	±%
Labor	Val Doube	17,308	65.5	+19.8
Liberal and Country	Charles Laming	9,135	34.5	+0.1
Total formal votes		26,443	98.5	−0.6
Informal votes		405	1.5	+0.6
Turnout		26,848	94.1	−1.4
Labor hold		Swing	+14.4	

=== Polwarth ===
1952 Victorian state election: Polwarth
Party	Candidate	Votes	%	±%
Liberal and Country	Edward Guye	8,340	57.6	0.0
Labor	Clair Larson	6,142	42.4	+9.9
Total formal votes		14,482	99.0	−0.5
Informal votes		146	1.0	+0.5
Turnout		14,628	95.3	−0.6
Liberal and Country hold		Swing	−8.9	

=== Portland ===
1952 Victorian state election: Portland
Party	Candidate	Votes	%	±%
Labor	Robert Holt	9,543	64.8	+13.5
Liberal and Country	Howard Turner	5,190	35.2	−3.0
Total formal votes		14,733	99.2	−0.3
Informal votes		117	0.8	+0.3
Turnout		14,850	96.1	−0.1
Labor hold		Swing	+12.5	

=== Port Melbourne ===
1952 Victorian state election: Port Melbourne
Party	Candidate	Votes	%	±%
Labor	Stan Corrigan	19,942	91.1	+14.9
Communist	Albert Bull	1,939	8.9	+3.8
Total formal votes		21,881	96.8	−1.2
Informal votes		716	3.2	+1.2
Turnout		22,597	91.2	−2.2
Labor hold		Swing	N/A	

=== Prahran ===
1952 Victorian state election: Prahran
Party	Candidate	Votes	%	±%
Labor	Robert Pettiona	13,009	61.6	+6.0
Liberal and Country	Charles Gawith	8,114	38.4	−6.0
Total formal votes		21,123	98.2	−0.8
Informal votes		380	1.8	+0.8
Turnout		21,503	92.2	−2.0
Labor hold		Swing	+6.0	

=== Preston ===
1952 Victorian state election: Preston
Party	Candidate	Votes	%	±%
Labor	William Ruthven	unopposed		
Labor hold		Swing		

=== Rainbow ===
1952 Victorian state election: Rainbow
Party	Candidate	Votes	%	±%
Country	Keith Dodgshun	unopposed		
Country hold		Swing		

=== Richmond ===
1952 Victorian state election: Richmond
Party	Candidate	Votes	%	±%
Labor	Frank Scully	18,474	90.2	+15.7
Communist	Kenneth Miller	2,016	9.8	+3.4
Total formal votes		20,490	96.2	−1.4
Informal votes		814	3.8	+1.4
Turnout		21,304	93.4	−2.0
Labor hold		Swing	N/A	

=== Ripon ===
1952 Victorian state election: Ripon
Party	Candidate	Votes	%	±%
Labor	Ernie Morton	8,726	59.9	+10.9
Liberal and Country	Rutherford Guthrie	5,846	40.1	+0.6
Total formal votes		14,572	99.1	−0.5
Informal votes		133	0.9	+0.5
Turnout		14,705	95.5	−0.3
Labor hold		Swing	+8.4	

=== Rodney ===
1952 Victorian state election: Rodney
Party	Candidate	Votes	%	±%
Country	Richard Brose	8,827	65.7	+8.4
Liberal and Country	Morton Garner	4,615	34.3	−8.4
Total formal votes		13,442	96.5	−1.6
Informal votes		483	3.5	+1.6
Turnout		13,925	95.0	+0.1
Country hold		Swing	+8.4	

=== St Kilda ===
1952 Victorian state election: St Kilda
Party	Candidate	Votes	%	±%
Labor	John Bourke	10,724	54.5	+6.8
Liberal and Country	Archie Michaelis	5,594	28.4	−23.9
Electoral Reform	Geoffrey Kiddle	3,378	17.1	+17.1
Total formal votes		19,696	97.7	−1.4
Informal votes		469	2.3	+1.4
Turnout		20,165	93.6	+0.3
Two-party-preferred result
Labor	John Bourke	11,062	56.2	+8.5
Liberal and Country	Archie Michaelis	8,634	43.8	−8.5
Labor gain from Liberal and Country		Swing	+8.5	

=== Scoresby ===
1952 Victorian state election: Scoresby
Party	Candidate	Votes	%	±%
Liberal and Country	George Knox	11,045	56.4	−18.1
Labor	Henry Moore	8,535	43.6	+43.6
Total formal votes		19,580	98.5	+0.3
Informal votes		288	1.5	−0.3
Turnout		19,868	92.6	−0.5
Liberal and Country hold		Swing	N/A	

=== Shepparton ===
1952 Victorian state election: Shepparton
Party	Candidate	Votes	%	±%
Country	John McDonald	7,367	46.4	+4.7
Labor	Gordon Anderson	6,231	39.2	+4.9
Liberal and Country	Ian McIntosh	2,293	14.4	−9.7
Total formal votes		15,891	98.6	−0.5
Informal votes		217	1.4	+0.5
Turnout		16,108	95.0	+0.1
Two-party-preferred result
Country	John McDonald	9,124	57.4	−4.1
Labor	Gordon Anderson	6,767	42.6	+4.1
Country hold		Swing	−4.1	

=== Sunshine ===
1952 Victorian state election: Sunshine
Party	Candidate	Votes	%	±%
Labor	Ernie Shepherd	unopposed		
Labor hold		Swing		

=== Swan Hill ===
1952 Victorian state election: Swan Hill
Party	Candidate	Votes	%	±%
Country	Harold Stirling	5,171	39.1	−9.2
Electoral Reform	John Hipworth	4,082	30.9	+30.9
Independent	Duncan Douglas	3,970	30.0	+30.0
Total formal votes		13,223	97.9	−1.2
Informal votes		278	2.1	+1.2
Turnout		13,501	94.3	−0.1
Two-candidate-preferred result
Country	Harold Stirling	9,124	57.4	+9.1
Electoral Reform	John Hipworth	5,504	41.6	+41.6
Country gain from Liberal and Country		Swing	N/A	

=== Toorak ===
1952 Victorian state election: Toorak
Party	Candidate	Votes	%	±%
Labor	Henry Peagram	8,925	43.7	+1.4
Liberal and Country	Horace Petty	7,424	36.4	−21.3
Electoral Reform	Mabel Brookes	4,068	19.9	+19.9
Total formal votes		20,417	98.3	−0.9
Informal votes		343	1.7	+0.9
Turnout		20,760	90.7	−4.8
Two-party-preferred result
Liberal and Country	Horace Petty	10,425	51.1	−6.6
Labor	Henry Peagram	9,992	48.9	+6.6
Liberal and Country hold		Swing	−6.6	

=== Warrnambool ===
1952 Victorian state election: Warrnambool
Party	Candidate	Votes	%	±%
Labor	Malcolm Gladman	7,256	51.1	+9.3
Liberal and Country	Ronald Mack	6,957	48.9	+14.8
Total formal votes		14,213	99.4	0.0
Informal votes		87	0.6	0.0
Turnout		14,300	96.1	−0.3
Labor gain from Liberal and Country		Swing	+2.1	

=== Williamstown ===
1952 Victorian state election: Williamstown
Party	Candidate	Votes	%	±%
Labor	John Lemmon	16,673	64.9	−0.3
Independent	Ernest Jackson	5,472	21.3	+21.3
Communist	Alexander Dobbin	3,559	13.8	+4.9
Total formal votes		25,704	98.0	−0.8
Informal votes		525	2.0	+0.8
Turnout		26,229	94.0	−1.3
Two-candidate-preferred result
Labor	John Lemmon	18,453	71.8	−1.4
Independent	Ernest Jackson	7,251	28.2	+28.2
Labor hold		Swing	N/A	

=== Wonthaggi ===
1952 Victorian state election: Wonthaggi
Party	Candidate	Votes	%	±%
Country	William Buckingham	8,176	56.4	+15.4
Labor	Percy Vagg	5,843	40.3	+5.1
Communist	Robert Hamilton	484	3.3	+3.3
Total formal votes		14,503	98.6	−0.9
Informal votes		207	1.4	+0.9
Turnout		14,710	94.9	−0.6
Two-party-preferred result
Country	William Buckingham	8,224	56.7	−6.4
Labor	Percy Vagg	6,279	43.3	+6.4
Country hold		Swing	−6.4	

== See also ==
- 1952 Victorian state election
- Members of the Victorian Legislative Assembly, 1952–1955
