= Members of the Victorian Legislative Assembly, 1950–1952 =

- ←1947–1950 1952–1955→

This is a list of members of the Victorian Legislative Assembly from 1950 to 1952, as elected at the 1950 state election and subsequent by-elections:

Name	Party	Electorate	Term in office
Nathaniel Barclay	Country	Mildura	1947–1952; 1955–1962
Bill Barry	Labor	Carlton	1932–1955
Frank Block^{[1]}	Liberal	Ivanhoe	1951–1952
Henry Bolte	Liberal	Hampden	1947–1972
Hon Richard Brose	Country	Rodney	1944–1964
William Buckingham	Country	Wonthaggi	1947–1955
Hon John Cain	Labor	Northcote	1917–1957
Leslie Cochrane	Country	Gippsland West	1950–1970
Frederick Cook	Country	Benalla	1936–1961
Stan Corrigan^{[3]}	Labor	Port Melbourne	1952–1955
Tom Corrigan^{[3]}	Labor	Port Melbourne	1942–1952
Frank Crean^{[2]}	Labor	Prahran	1945–1947; 1949–1951
Rupert Curnow^{[1]}	Liberal	Ivanhoe	1947–1950
William Dawnay-Mould	Liberal/Independent^{[5]}	Dandenong	1947–1952
Alexander Dennett	Liberal/Independent^{[5]}	Caulfield	1945–1955
Hon Keith Dodgshun	Country	Rainbow	1938–1955
John Don	Liberal/Independent^{[5]}	Elsternwick	1945–1955
Val Doube	Labor	Oakleigh	1950–1961; 1970–1979
James Dunn	Labor	Geelong	1950–1955
George Fewster	Labor	Essendon	1950–1955
Alexander Fraser	Liberal	Grant	1950–1952; 1955–1965
Hon Bill Fulton	Country	Gippsland North	1942–1945; 1947–1952
Hon Bill Galvin	Labor	Bendigo	1945–1955; 1958–1964
Edward Guye	Liberal	Polwarth	1940–1958
Tom Hayes	Labor	Melbourne	1924–1955
John Hipworth	Liberal/Independent^{[5]}	Swan Hill	1945–1952
Jack Holland	Labor	Footscray	1925–1955
Hon Thomas Hollway	Liberal/Independent^{[5]}	Ballarat	1932–1955
Robert Holt	Labor	Portland	1945–1947; 1950–1955
Hon Sir Herbert Hyland	Country	Gippsland South	1929–1970
Arthur Ireland	Liberal	Mernda	1947–1952
Brig. Sir George Knox	Liberal	Scoresby	1927–1960
Roland Leckie	Liberal	Evelyn	1950–1952
William Leggatt	Liberal	Mornington	1947–1956
John Lemmon	Labor	Williamstown	1904–1955
Hon Sir Albert Lind	Country	Gippsland East	1920–1961
Hon John McDonald	Country	Shepparton	1936–1955
William McDonald	Liberal	Dundas	1947–1952; 1955–1970
Ronald Mack	Liberal	Warrnambool	1950–1952
Sir Thomas Maltby	Liberal	Barwon	1929–1961
Samuel Merrifield	Labor	Moonee Ponds	1943–1955
Wilfred Mibus	Liberal	Borung	1944–1964
Hon Archie Michaelis	Liberal	St Kilda	1932–1952
Hon Tom Mitchell	Country	Benambra	1947–1976
Ernie Morton	Labor	Ripon	1945–1947; 1950–1955
Hon George Moss	Country	Murray Valley	1945–1973
Charlie Mutton	Ind. Labor	Coburg	1940–1967
Les Norman	Liberal	Glen Iris	1947–1952
Joseph O'Carroll	Labor	Clifton Hill	1949–1955
Trevor Oldham	Liberal	Malvern	1933–1953
Robert Pettiona^{[2]}	Labor	Prahran	1951–1955
Horace Petty^{[4]}	Liberal	Toorak	1952–1964
Peter Randles	Labor	Brunswick	1949–1955
George Reid	Liberal	Box Hill	1947–1952; 1955–1973
Edward Reynolds^{[4]}	Liberal	Toorak	1948–1952
William Ruthven	Labor	Preston	1945–1961
Arthur Rylah	Liberal	Kew	1949–1971
Frank Scully	Labor	Richmond	1949–1958
Ernie Shepherd	Labor	Sunshine	1945–1958
Joseph Smith	Labor	Goulburn	1945–1947; 1950–1955
Clive Stoneham	Labor	Midlands	1942–1970
Keith Sutton	Labor	Albert Park	1950–1970
Brig. Ray Tovell	Liberal/Independent^{[5]}	Brighton	1945–1955
Bill Towers	Labor	Collingwood	1947–1962
Keith Turnbull	Liberal	Korong	1950–1964
Les Tyack	Liberal	Hawthorn	1939–1940; 1950–1952
Robert Whately	Liberal	Camberwell	1945–1956
George White	Labor	Mentone	1945–1947; 1950–1955
Hon Russell White	Country	Allandale	1945–1960

^{1} On 18 December 1950, the Liberal member for Ivanhoe, Rupert Curnow, died. Liberal candidate Frank Block won the resulting by-election on 24 February 1951.
^{2} In March 1951, the Labor member for Prahran, Frank Crean, resigned to stand for Division of Melbourne Ports at the 1951 federal election. Labor candidate Robert Pettiona won the resulting by-election on 16 June 1951.
^{3} On 19 January 1952, the Labor member for Port Melbourne, Tom Corrigan, died. His son, Stan Corrigan won the resulting by-election for Labor on 13 September 1952.
^{4} In July 1952, the Liberal member for Toorak, Edward Reynolds, resigned. Liberal candidate Horace Petty won the resulting by-election on 13 September 1952.
^{5} In September 1952, former Premier Thomas Hollway was expelled from the Liberal Party. He managed to form a short-lived ministry in October consisting entirely of his supporters; this ministry's defeat was the catalyst for the December 1952 election at which three of his five parliamentary supporters retained their seats and Hollway himself won the seat of Glen Iris from the Liberal leader, Les Norman.

== Sources ==
- "Find a Member". State Government of Victoria.
