= Candidates of the 1952 Victorian state election =

The 1952 Victorian state election was held on 6 December 1952.

== Retiring Members ==
None at this election.

== Legislative Assembly ==
Sitting members are shown in bold text. Successful candidates are highlighted in the relevant colour. Where there is possible confusion, an asterisk (*) is also used.

Electorate	Held by	Labor candidates	LCP candidates	Country candidates	ERL candidates	Other candidates
Albert Park	Labor	**Keith Sutton**	Desmond Byrne			
Allandale	Country	Patrick Denigan		**Russell White**		
Ballarat	LCP	John Sheehan	William Roff			
Barwon	LCP	Charles Plummer	**Sir Thomas Maltby**			
Benalla	Country			**Frederick Cook**		
Benambra	Country	Geoffrey Holland		**Tom Mitchell**		
Bendigo	Labor	**Bill Galvin**				
Borung	LCP	Lionel Reid	**Wilfred Mibus**			
Box Hill	LCP	Bob Gray	**George Reid**			Thomas Mullett (Ind)
Brighton	LCP		Raymond Trickey		**Ray Tovell**	Allistair Bruce (Ind); Finlay Julyan (Ind); Grace Stratton (Ind)
Brunswick	Labor	**Peter Randles**				
Camberwell	LCP	Florence Rodan	**Robert Whately**		Vernon Wilcox	Reginald Cooper (Ind)
Carlton	Labor	**Bill Barry**				John Prescott (CPA)
Caulfield	LCP				**Alexander Dennett**	Robert Flanagan (Ind Lab)
Clifton Hill	Labor	**Joseph O'Carroll**				
Coburg	Ind Labor	Kevin Hayes				**Charlie Mutton** (Ind Lab)
Collingwood	Labor	**Bill Towers**				
Dandenong	LCP	Les Coates			**William Dawnay-Mould**	Arthur O'Donoghue (CPA); Walter Peterson (Ind Lib)
Dundas	LCP	Bob McClure	**William McDonald**			
Elsternwick	LCP	John Maynes			**John Don**	Andrew Sinclair (Ind)
Essendon	Labor	**George Fewster**	Kenneth Wheeler			Lancelot Hutchinson (HGJP)
Evelyn	LCP	Phillip Connell	**Roland Leckie**		Lindsay Gown	Lyndhurst Mullett (Ind)
Footscray	Labor	**Jack Holland**				Francis Johnson (CPA)
Geelong	Labor	**James Dunn**	Geoffrey Thom			
Gippsland East	Country			**Sir Albert Lind**		
Gippsland North	Country	Hector Stoddart		**Bill Fulton**		
Gippsland South	Country	Sydney Crofts		**Sir Herbert Hyland**		
Gippsland West	Country	Thomas Holland	Mac Steward	**Leslie Cochrane**		
Glen Iris	LCP		**Les Norman**		**Thomas Hollway**	Ian Turner (CPA)
Goulburn	Labor	**Joseph Smith**	John Roberts			
Grant	LCP	Leslie D'Arcy	**Alexander Fraser**			Thomas Fynmore (Ind)
Hampden	LCP	Robert Balcombe	**Henry Bolte**			Keith McGarvie (Ind)
Hawthorn	LCP	Charles Murphy	**Les Tyack**		Charles Calderwood	
Ivanhoe	LCP	Michael Lucy	**Frank Block**		Harcourt Bell	Reginald Leonard (Ind)
Kew	LCP	Norman Williams	**Arthur Rylah**		John Eddy	
Korong	LCP	Campbell Turnbull	**Keith Turnbull**	Frank Coghill	Wallace Lunn	
Malvern	LCP	Francis Gaffy	**Trevor Oldham**		Roy Schilling	Mascotte Brown (Ind)
Melbourne	Labor	**Tom Hayes**				
Mentone	Labor	**George White**	Charles Bridgford			
Mernda	LCP	Edmund Morrissey	**Arthur Ireland**			
Midlands	Labor	**Clive Stoneham**				
Mildura	Country	Alan Lind		**Nathaniel Barclay**		
Moonee Ponds	Labor	**Samuel Merrifield**				
Mornington	LCP	Norman Parker	**William Leggatt**		Gerard Hirst	Morton Moyes (Ind)
Murray Valley	Country	William Findlay	James Mosbey	**George Moss**		
Northcote	Labor	**John Cain**				
Oakleigh	Labor	**Val Doube**	Charles Laming			
Polwarth	LCP	Clair Larson	**Edward Guye**			
Portland	Labor	**Robert Holt**	Howard Turner			
Port Melbourne	Labor	**Stan Corrigan**				Albert Bull (CPA)
Prahran	Labor	**Robert Pettiona**	Charles Gawith			
Preston	Labor	**William Ruthven**				
Rainbow	Country			**Keith Dodgshun**		
Richmond	Labor	**Frank Scully**				Kenneth Miller (CPA)
Ripon	Labor	**Ernie Morton**	Rutherford Guthrie			
Rodney	Country		Morton Garner	**Richard Brose**		
St Kilda	LCP	John Bourke	**Sir Archie Michaelis**		Geoffrey Kiddle	
Scoresby	LCP	Henry Moore	**Sir George Knox**			
Shepparton	Country	Gordon Anderson	Ian McIntosh	**John McDonald**		
Sunshine	Labor	**Ernie Shepherd**				
Swan Hill	LCP			Harold Stirling	**John Hipworth**	Duncan Douglas (Ind)
Toorak	LCP	Henry Peagram	**Horace Petty**		Mabel Brookes	
Warrnambool	LCP	Malcolm Gladman	**Ronald Mack**			
Williamstown	Labor	**John Lemmon**				Alexander Dobbin (CPA); Ernest Jackson (Ind)
Wonthaggi	Country	Percy Vagg		**William Buckingham**		Robert Hamilton (CPA)

== See also ==
- 1952 Victorian Legislative Council election
