= Electoral results for the district of Port Melbourne =

Victoria, Australia, district election results

This is a list of electoral results for the electoral district of Port Melbourne in Victorian state elections.

== Members for Port Melbourne ==
Member	Party	Term
Frederick Derham	Unaligned	1889–1892
Philip Salmon	Unaligned ^{[1]}	1892–1894
George Sangster	Labor	1894–1902
George Sangster	Independent Labor	1902–1906
George Sangster	Labor	1906–1915
Owen Sinclair	Labor	1915–1917
Owen Sinclair	Independent	1917
James Murphy	Labor	1917–1942
Tom Corrigan	Labor	1942–1952
Stan Corrigan	Labor	1952–1955
Stan Corrigan	Labor (Anti-Communist)	1955
Archie Todd	Labor	1955–1958

== Election results ==
=== Elections in the 1950s ===
1955 Victorian state election: Port Melbourne
Party	Candidate	Votes	%	±%
Labor	Archie Todd	7,701	50.1	
Labor (A-C)	Stan Corrigan	5,349	34.8	
Liberal and Country	John Talbot	1,972	12.8	
Communist	Laurence Troy	340	2.2	
Total formal votes		15,362	95.9	
Informal votes		657	4.1	
Turnout		16,019	93.1	
Two-candidate-preferred result
Labor	Archie Todd	8,492	55.3	
Labor (A-C)	Stan Corrigan	6,870	44.7	
Labor hold		Swing		

1952 Victorian state election: Port Melbourne
Party	Candidate	Votes	%	±%
Labor	Stan Corrigan	19,942	91.1	+14.9
Communist	Albert Bull	1,939	8.9	+3.8
Total formal votes		21,881	96.8	−1.2
Informal votes		716	3.2	+1.2
Turnout		22,597	91.2	−2.2
Labor hold		Swing	N/A	

1952 Port Melbourne state by-election
Party	Candidate	Votes	%	±%
Labor	Stan Corrigan	16,353	78.93	+2.78
Liberal and Country	Kenneth Cole	2,730	13.18	−5.60
Communist	William Bird	1,636	7.90	+2.82
Total formal votes		20,719	97.95	−0.03
Informal votes		433	2.05	+0.03
Turnout		21,152	84.0	−9.0
Labor hold		Swing	+2.78	

1950 Victorian state election: Port Melbourne
Party	Candidate	Votes	%	±%
Labor	Tom Corrigan	18,598	76.2	+7.3
Liberal and Country	Alex Taylor	4,587	18.8	−6.1
Communist	Ralph Gibson	1,239	5.1	−1.1
Total formal votes		24,424	98.0	+0.4
Informal votes		503	2.0	−0.4
Turnout		24,927	93.4	+0.4
Two-party-preferred result
Labor	Tom Corrigan	19,713	80.7	+6.5
Liberal and Country	Alex Taylor	4,711	19.3	−6.5
Labor hold		Swing	+6.5	

=== Elections in the 1940s ===
1947 Victorian state election: Port Melbourne
Party	Candidate	Votes	%	±%
Labor	Tom Corrigan	17,446	68.9	−7.5
Liberal	Stanley Evans	6,315	24.9	+24.9
Communist	Ralph Gibson	1,575	6.2	−17.4
Total formal votes		25,336	97.6	+2.3
Informal votes		622	2.4	−2.3
Turnout		25,958	93.0	+6.9
Labor hold		Swing	N/A	

- Preferences were not distributed.

1945 Victorian state election: Port Melbourne
Party	Candidate	Votes	%	±%
Labor	Tom Corrigan	16,777	76.4	
Communist	Ralph Gibson	5,177	23.6	
Total formal votes		21,954	95.3	
Informal votes		1,076	4.7	
Turnout		23,030	86.1	
Labor hold		Swing		

1943 Victorian state election: Port Melbourne
Party	Candidate	Votes	%	±%
Labor	Tom Corrigan	11,644	61.2	−38.8
Communist	John Blake	7,384	38.8	+38.8
Total formal votes		19,028	95.8	
Informal votes		828	4.2	
Turnout		19,856	87.6	
Labor hold		Swing	N/A	

1942 Port Melbourne state by-election
Party	Candidate	Votes	%	±%
Labor	Tom Corrigan	10,156	59.6	−40.4
Communist	John Blake	6,890	40.4	+40.4
Total formal votes		17,046	97.5	
Informal votes		432	2.5	
Turnout		17,478	80.4	
Labor hold		Swing	N/A	

1940 Victorian state election: Port Melbourne
Party	Candidate	Votes	%	±%
Labor	James Murphy	unopposed		
Labor hold		Swing		

=== Elections in the 1930s ===
1937 Victorian state election: Port Melbourne
Party	Candidate	Votes	%	±%
Labor	James Murphy	15,014	76.2	+2.4
Independent	Mary Jones	4,703	23.8	−2.4
Total formal votes		19,717	98.2	+0.9
Informal votes		354	1.8	−0.9
Turnout		20,071	93.8	+0.9
Labor hold		Swing	+2.4	

1935 Victorian state election: Port Melbourne
Party	Candidate	Votes	%	±%
Labor	James Murphy	14,844	73.8	−26.2
Independent	Mary Jones	5,258	26.2	+26.2
Total formal votes		20,102	97.3	
Informal votes		567	2.7	
Turnout		20,669	92.9	
Labor hold		Swing	N/A	

1932 Victorian state election: Port Melbourne
Party	Candidate	Votes	%	±%
Labor	James Murphy	unopposed		
Labor hold		Swing		

=== Elections in the 1920s ===
1929 Victorian state election: Port Melbourne
Party	Candidate	Votes	%	±%
Labor	James Murphy	16,648	89.5	−10.5
Communist	Thomas Le Huray	1,962	10.5	+10.5
Total formal votes		18,610	96.7	
Informal votes		637	3.3	
Turnout		19,247	90.4	
Labor hold		Swing	N/A	

1927 Victorian state election: Port Melbourne
Party	Candidate	Votes	%	±%
Labor	James Murphy	unopposed		
Labor hold		Swing		

1924 Victorian state election: Port Melbourne
Party	Candidate	Votes	%	±%
Labor	James Murphy	unopposed		
Labor hold		Swing		

1921 Victorian state election: Port Melbourne
Party	Candidate	Votes	%	±%
Labor	James Murphy	unopposed		
Labor hold		Swing		

1920 Victorian state election: Port Melbourne
Party	Candidate	Votes	%	±%
Labor	James Murphy	7,062	67.9	+13.6
Independent	Owen Sinclair	3,337	32.1	+10.0
Total formal votes		10,399	98.6	+1.7
Informal votes		151	1.4	−1.7
Turnout		10,550	65.8	+5.0
Labor hold		Swing	N/A	

=== Elections in the 1910s ===
1917 Victorian state election: Port Melbourne
Party	Candidate	Votes	%	±%
Labor	James Murphy	5,242	54.3	
Nationalist	James Crichton	2,202	22.8	
Independent Labor	Owen Sinclair	2,134	22.1	
Independent Labor	Henry Sanderson	74	0.8	
Total formal votes		9,652	96.9	
Informal votes		306	3.1	
Turnout		9,958	60.8	
Two-party-preferred result
Labor	James Murphy		71.5	
Nationalist	James Crichton		28.5	
Labor hold		Swing	N/A	

- Two party preferred vote was estimated.

1915 Port Melbourne state by-election
Party	Candidate	Votes	%	±%
Labor	Owen Sinclair	unopposed		
Labor hold		Swing		

1914 Victorian state election: Port Melbourne
Party	Candidate	Votes	%	±%
Labor	George Sangster	unopposed		
Labor hold		Swing		

1911 Victorian state election: Port Melbourne
Party	Candidate	Votes	%	±%
Labor	George Sangster	6,295	82.0	N/A
Independent Liberal	Reuben Kefford	1,382	18.0	+18.0
Total formal votes		7,677	98.6	
Informal votes		108	1.4	
Turnout		7,785	50.6	
Labor hold		Swing	N/A	
