= Electoral results for the district of Camberwell =

Victoria, Australia, district election results

This is a list of electoral results for the electoral district of Camberwell in Victorian state elections.

== Members for Camberwell ==
Member	Party	Term
Robert Whately	Liberal	1945 – 1956
Vernon Wilcox	Liberal	1956 – 1976

== Election results ==
=== Elections in the 1970s ===
1973 Victorian state election: Camberwell
Party	Candidate	Votes	%	±%
Liberal	Vernon Wilcox	14,678	61.9	+7.8
Labor	Colin MacLeod	7,190	30.3	−2.6
Democratic Labor	Joseph Stanley	1,829	7.7	−5.2
Total formal votes		23,697	98.2	+0.4
Informal votes		421	1.8	−0.4
Turnout		24,118	93.2	+0.4
Two-party-preferred result
Liberal	Vernon Wilcox	16,233	68.5	+3.4
Labor	Colin MacLeod	7,464	31.5	−3.4
Liberal hold		Swing	+3.4	

1970 Victorian state election: Camberwell
Party	Candidate	Votes	%	±%
Liberal	Vernon Wilcox	12,159	54.1	−5.6
Labor	Allan McDonald	7,392	32.9	+6.7
Democratic Labor	Joseph Stanley	2,901	12.9	−1.2
Total formal votes		22,452	97.8	+0.2
Informal votes		496	2.2	−0.2
Turnout		22,948	92.8	0.0
Two-party-preferred result
Liberal	Vernon Wilcox	14,625	65.1	−6.6
Labor	Allan McDonald	7,827	34.9	+6.6
Liberal hold		Swing	−6.6	

=== Elections in the 1960s ===
1967 Victorian state election: Camberwell
Party	Candidate	Votes	%	±%
Liberal	Vernon Wilcox	13,508	59.7	−3.0
Labor	Adrianus Knulst	5,938	26.2	+2.2
Democratic Labor	Joseph Stanley	3,190	14.1	+0.8
Total formal votes		22,636	97.6	
Informal votes		548	2.4	
Turnout		23,184	92.8	
Two-party-preferred result
Liberal	Vernon Wilcox	16,219	71.7	−2.4
Labor	Adrianus Knulst	6,417	28.3	+2.4
Liberal hold		Swing	−2.4	

1964 Victorian state election: Camberwell
Party	Candidate	Votes	%	±%
Liberal and Country	Vernon Wilcox	10,856	58.1	+0.8
Labor	Dolph Eddy	5,304	28.4	+0.6
Democratic Labor	John Rogers	2,525	13.5	−1.4
Total formal votes		18,685	98.0	+0.1
Informal votes		373	2.0	−0.1
Turnout		19,058	92.5	−0.5
Two-party-preferred result
Liberal and Country	Vernon Wilcox	13,003	69.6	−0.4
Labor	Dolph Eddy	5,682	30.4	+0.4
Liberal and Country hold		Swing	−0.4	

1961 Victorian state election: Camberwell
Party	Candidate	Votes	%	±%
Liberal and Country	Vernon Wilcox	10,773	57.3	−3.1
Labor	Anthony Giblett	5,218	27.8	+0.6
Democratic Labor	Celia Laird	2,808	14.9	+2.4
Total formal votes		18,799	97.9	−0.4
Informal votes		406	2.1	+0.4
Turnout		19,205	93.0	−0.7
Two-party-preferred result
Liberal and Country	Vernon Wilcox	13,160	70.0	−2.0
Labor	Anthony Giblett	5,639	30.0	+2.0
Liberal and Country hold		Swing	−2.0	

=== Elections in the 1950s ===
1958 Victorian state election: Camberwell
Party	Candidate	Votes	%	±%
Liberal and Country	Vernon Wilcox	11,673	60.4	
Labor	George Blood	5,251	27.2	
Democratic Labor	Leonora Lloyd	2,411	12.5	
Total formal votes		19,335	98.3	
Informal votes		339	1.7	
Turnout		19,674	93.7	
Two-party-preferred result
Liberal and Country	Vernon Wilcox	13,722	72.0	
Labor	George Blood	5,613	28.0	
Liberal and Country hold		Swing		

- Two party preferred vote was estimated.

1956 Camberwell state by-election
Party	Candidate	Votes	%	±%
Liberal and Country	Vernon Wilcox	10,931	63.9	−3.1
Labor	George Grace	6,185	36.1	+3.1
Total formal votes		14,748	98.1	−0.2
Informal votes		281	1.9	+0.2
Turnout		15,029	84.5	−8.4
Liberal and Country hold		Swing	−3.1	

1955 Victorian state election: Camberwell
Party	Candidate	Votes	%	±%
Liberal and Country	Robert Whately	13,369	67.0	
Labor	Barry Jones	6,595	33.0	
Total formal votes		19,964	98.3	
Informal votes		336	1.7	
Turnout		20,300	92.9	
Liberal and Country hold		Swing		

1952 Victorian state election: Camberwell
Party	Candidate	Votes	%	±%
Labor	Florence Rodan	8,664	32.9	−2.0
Liberal and Country	Robert Whately	7,084	26.9	−38.2
Electoral Reform	Vernon Wilcox	5,564	21.1	+21.1
Independent	Reginald Cooper	5,046	19.1	+19.1
Total formal votes		26,358	97.8	−1.5
Informal votes		599	2.2	+1.5
Turnout		26,957	94.2	+0.5
Two-party-preferred result
Liberal and Country	Robert Whately	15,472	58.7	−6.4
Labor	Florence Rodan	10,886	41.3	+6.4
Liberal and Country hold		Swing	−6.4	

1950 Victorian state election: Camberwell
Party	Candidate	Votes	%	±%
Liberal and Country	Robert Whately	16,390	65.1	−2.1
Labor	John Stewart	8,788	34.9	+34.9
Total formal votes		25,178	99.3	+2.8
Informal votes		182	0.7	−2.8
Turnout		25,360	93.7	+1.9
Liberal and Country hold		Swing	N/A	

=== Elections in the 1940s ===
1947 Victorian state election: Camberwell
Party	Candidate	Votes	%	±%
Liberal	Robert Whately	16,021	67.2	+26.6
Independent Liberal	Walter Fordham	7,803	32.8	+2.5
Total formal votes		23,824	96.5	−1.0
Informal votes		858	3.5	+1.0
Turnout		24,682	91.8	+3.7
Liberal hold		Swing	+13.7	

1945 Victorian state election: Camberwell
Party	Candidate	Votes	%	±%
Liberal	Robert Whately	8,775	40.6	
Independent	Walter Fordham	6,542	30.3	
Independent	Dora Nankivell	3,476	16.1	
Ministerial Liberal	Norman Mackay	2,801	13.0	
Total formal votes		21,594	97.5	
Informal votes		549	2.5	
Turnout		22,143	88.1	
Two-candidate-preferred result
Liberal	Robert Whately	11,556	53.5	
Independent	Walter Fordham	10,038	46.5	
Liberal hold		Swing		
