= Electoral results for the district of Elsternwick =

Australian district election results

This is a list of electoral results for the electoral district of Elsternwick in Victorian state elections.

== Members for Elsternwick ==
Member	Party	Term
John Don	Liberal Party	1945–1955
John Don	Electoral Reform League	1945–1955
Richard Gainey	Liberal Party	1955–1967

== Election results ==
=== Elections in the 1960s ===
1964 Victorian state election: Elsternwick
Party	Candidate	Votes	%	±%
Liberal and Country	Richard Gainey	11,233	58.5	+2.9
Labor	Robert Garlick	5,196	27.1	−0.6
Democratic Labor	Edward Preece	2,756	14.4	−2.2
Total formal votes		19,185	98.0	+0.1
Informal votes		384	2.0	−0.1
Turnout		19,569	93.7	−0.9
Two-party-preferred result
Liberal and Country	Richard Gainey	13,575	70.8	+1.0
Labor	Robert Garlick	5,610	29.2	−1.0
Liberal and Country hold		Swing	+1.0	

1961 Victorian state election: Elsternwick
Party	Candidate	Votes	%	±%
Liberal and Country	Richard Gainey	10,618	55.6	−3.3
Labor	George Smith	5,287	27.7	+1.9
Democratic Labor	Edward Preece	3,174	16.6	+1.3
Total formal votes		19,079	97.9	−0.3
Informal votes		407	2.1	+0.3
Turnout		19,486	94.6	+1.8
Two-party-preferred result
Liberal and Country	Richard Gainey	13,316	69.8	−2.1
Labor	George Smith	5,763	30.2	+2.1
Liberal and Country hold		Swing	−2.1	

=== Elections in the 1950s ===
1958 Victorian state election: Elsternwick
Party	Candidate	Votes	%	±%
Liberal and Country	Richard Gainey	11,638	58.9	
Labor	George Smith	5,108	25.8	
Democratic Labor	Rex Keane	3,025	15.3	
Total formal votes		19,771	98.2	
Informal votes		358	1.8	
Turnout		20,129	92.8	
Two-party-preferred result
Liberal and Country	Richard Gainey	14,209	71.9	
Labor	George Smith	5,562	28.1	
Liberal and Country hold		Swing		

- Two party preferred vote was estimated.

1955 Victorian state election: Elsternwick
Party	Candidate	Votes	%	±%
Victorian Liberal	John Don	8,401	43.5	
Liberal and Country	Richard Gainey	6,918	35.8	
Independent Labor	Donald Tottey	4,002	20.7	
Total formal votes		19,321	97.6	
Informal votes		477	2.4	
Turnout		19,798	93.5	
Two-candidate-preferred result
Liberal and Country	Richard Gainey	9,950	51.5	
Victorian Liberal	John Don	9,371	48.5	
Liberal and Country gain from Victorian Liberal		Swing		

1952 Victorian state election: Elsternwick
Party	Candidate	Votes	%	±%
Labor	John Maynes	8,453	42.4	+3.2
Electoral Reform	John Don	8,389	42.1	+42.1
Independent	Andrew Sinclair	3,075	15.4	+15.4
Total formal votes		19,917	98.2	−1.1
Informal votes		370	1.8	+1.1
Turnout		20,287	94.5	+1.3
Two-candidate-preferred result
Electoral Reform	John Don	11,152	55.5	+55.5
Labor	John Maynes	8,865	44.5	+5.3
Electoral Reform gain from Liberal and Country		Swing	N/A	

1950 Victorian state election: Elsternwick
Party	Candidate	Votes	%	±%
Liberal and Country	John Don	12,932	60.8	−3.4
Labor	Harold Lorback	8,351	39.2	+3.4
Total formal votes		21,283	99.3	0.0
Informal votes		144	0.7	0.0
Turnout		21,427	93.2	+1.4
Liberal and Country hold		Swing	−3.4	

=== Elections in the 1940s ===
1947 Victorian state election: Elsternwick
Party	Candidate	Votes	%	±%
Liberal	John Don	14,256	64.2	+14.3
Labor	Gregory Gowans	7,955	35.8	+35.8
Total formal votes		22,211	99.3	+1.5
Informal votes		159	0.7	−1.5
Turnout		22,370	91.8	+3.8
Liberal hold		Swing	N/A	

1945 Victorian state election: Elsternwick
Party	Candidate	Votes	%	±%
Liberal	John Don	10,019	49.9	
Independent	Karl Dorr	5,357	26.7	
Ministerial Liberal	Roy Schilling	4,880	23.3	
Total formal votes		20,056	97.8	
Informal votes		456	2.2	
Turnout		20,512	88.0	
Two-candidate-preferred result
Liberal	John Don	11,347	56.6	
Independent	Karl Dorr	8,709	43.4	
Liberal hold		Swing		
