= Electoral results for the district of Glen Iris =

Victoria, Australia, district election results

This is a list of electoral results for the electoral district of Glen Iris in Victorian state elections.

== Members for Glen Iris ==
First incarnation 1945–1955
Member	Party	Term
Ian McLaren	Independent	1945–1947
Les Norman	Liberal / LCP	1947–1952
Thomas Hollway	Electoral Reform League	1952–1955

Second incarnation 1967–1976
Member	Party	Term
Jim MacDonald	Liberal	1967–1976

== Election results ==
=== Elections in the 1970s ===
1973 Victorian state election: Glen Iris
Party	Candidate	Votes	%	±%
Liberal	Jim MacDonald	13,690	56.5	+2.9
Labor	Douglas Gammon	7,064	29.2	−5.5
Democratic Labor	Edward Cleary	1,749	7.2	−4.4
Australia	Jack Hammond	1,731	7.1	+7.1
Total formal votes		24,234	98.3	+0.4
Informal votes		425	1.7	−0.4
Turnout		24,659	92.9	−0.5
Two-party-preferred result
Liberal	Jim MacDonald	15,869	65.5	+2.0
Labor	Douglas Gammon	8,365	34.5	−2.0
Liberal hold		Swing	+2.0	

1970 Victorian state election: Glen Iris
Party	Candidate	Votes	%	±%
Liberal	Jim MacDonald	12,261	53.6	−2.4
Labor	Douglas Gammon	7,942	34.7	+5.3
Democratic Labor	John Preece	2,657	11.6	−3.0
Total formal votes		22,860	97.9	+0.3
Informal votes		479	2.1	−0.3
Turnout		23,339	93.4	−0.8
Two-party-preferred result
Liberal	Jim MacDonald	14,519	63.5	−5.0
Labor	Douglas Gammon	8,341	36.5	+5.0
Liberal hold		Swing	−5.0	

=== Elections in the 1960s ===
1967 Victorian state election: Glen Iris
Party	Candidate	Votes	%	±%
Liberal	Jim MacDonald	12,944	56.0	−6.5
Labor	Allan McDonald	6,779	29.4	+3.9
Democratic Labor	Kenneth Abbott	3,378	14.6	+2.6
Total formal votes		23,101	97.6	
Informal votes		565	2.4	
Turnout		23,666	94.2	
Two-party-preferred result
Liberal	Jim MacDonald	15,815	68.5	−4.3
Labor	Allan McDonald	7,286	31.5	+4.3
Liberal hold		Swing	−4.3	

=== Elections in the 1950s ===
1952 Victorian state election: Glen Iris
Party	Candidate	Votes	%	±%
Electoral Reform	Thomas Hollway	15,152	56.4	+56.4
Liberal and Country	Les Norman	10,727	39.9	−26.6
Communist	Ian Turner	971	3.6	+3.6
Total formal votes		26,850	97.9	−1.4
Informal votes		585	2.1	+1.4
Turnout		27,435	94.7	0.0
Two-candidate-preferred result
Electoral Reform	Thomas Hollway	15,638	58.2	+58.2
Liberal and Country	Les Norman	11,212	41.8	−24.7
Electoral Reform gain from Liberal and Country		Swing	N/A	

1950 Victorian state election: Glen Iris
Party	Candidate	Votes	%	±%
Liberal and Country	Les Norman	16,532	66.5	+5.3
Labor	Gwendolyn Noad	8,333	33.5	+33.5
Total formal votes		24,865	99.3	+0.2
Informal votes		179	0.7	−0.2
Turnout		25,044	94.7	+1.2
Liberal and Country hold		Swing	N/A	

=== Elections in the 1940s ===
1947 Victorian state election: Glen Iris
Party	Candidate	Votes	%	±%
Liberal	Les Norman	14,190	61.2	+20.6
Independent	Ian McLaren	8,991	38.8	+8.4
Total formal votes		23,181	99.1	+0.5
Informal votes		211	0.9	−0.5
Turnout		23,392	93.5	+5.6
Liberal gain from Independent		Swing	+18.2	

1945 Victorian state election: Glen Iris
Party	Candidate	Votes	%	±%
Liberal	Alan Moir	8,305	40.6	
Independent	Ian McLaren	6,223	30.4	
Labor	Thomas Brennan	5,921	29.0	
Total formal votes		20,449	98.6	
Informal votes		287	1.4	
Turnout		20,736	87.9	
Two-candidate-preferred result
Independent	Ian McLaren	11,646	57.0	
Liberal	Alan Moir	8,803	43.0	
Independent gain from Liberal		Swing		
