= Electoral results for the district of Wonthaggi =

Australian district election results

This is a list of electoral results for the electoral district of Wonthaggi in Victorian state elections.

== Members for Wonthaggi ==
Member	Party	Term
William McKenzie	Labor	1927–1947
William Buckingham	Country	1947–1955

== Election results ==
=== Elections in the 1950s ===
1952 Victorian state election: Wonthaggi
Party	Candidate	Votes	%	±%
Country	William Buckingham	8,176	56.4	+15.4
Labor	Percy Vagg	5,843	40.3	+5.1
Communist	Robert Hamilton	484	3.3	+3.3
Total formal votes		14,503	98.6	−0.9
Informal votes		207	1.4	+0.9
Turnout		14,710	94.9	−0.6
Two-party-preferred result
Country	William Buckingham	8,224	56.7	−6.4
Labor	Percy Vagg	6,279	43.3	+6.4
Country hold		Swing	−6.4	

1950 Victorian state election: Wonthaggi
Party	Candidate	Votes	%	±%
Country	William Buckingham	6,016	41.0	−16.0
Labor	Percy Vagg	5,161	35.2	−7.8
Liberal and Country	Robert McIndoe	3,499	23.8	+23.8
Total formal votes		14,676	99.5	−0.1
Informal votes		79	0.5	+0.1
Turnout		14,755	95.5	+0.2
Two-party-preferred result
Country	William Buckingham	9,256	63.1	+6.1
Labor	Percy Vagg	5,470	36.9	−6.1
Country hold		Swing	+6.1	

=== Elections in the 1940s ===
1947 Victorian state election: Wonthaggi
Party	Candidate	Votes	%	±%
Country	William Buckingham	8,317	57.0	+14.3
Labor	William McKenzie	5,281	43.0	−14.3
Total formal votes		14,598	99.6	+0.4
Informal votes		64	0.4	−0.4
Turnout		14,662	95.3	+5.4
Country gain from Labor		Swing	+14.3	

1945 Victorian state election: Wonthaggi
Party	Candidate	Votes	%	±%
Labor	William McKenzie	7,589	57.3	
Country	Alexander Shackleford	5,658	42.7	
Total formal votes		13,247	99.2	
Informal votes		108	0.8	
Turnout		13,355	89.9	
Labor hold		Swing		

1943 Victorian state election: Wonthaggi
Party	Candidate	Votes	%	±%
Labor	William McKenzie	unopposed		
Labor hold		Swing		

1940 Victorian state election: Wonthaggi
Party	Candidate	Votes	%	±%
Labor	William McKenzie	unopposed		
Labor hold		Swing		

=== Elections in the 1930s ===
1937 Victorian state election: Wonthaggi
Party	Candidate	Votes	%	±%
Labor	William McKenzie	8,334	89.6	+31.3
Communist	Alfred Watt	963	10.4	+2.4
Total formal votes		9,297	98.9	−0.1
Informal votes		101	1.1	+0.1
Turnout		9,398	93.7	−1.8
Labor hold		Swing	N/A	

1935 Victorian state election: Wonthaggi
Party	Candidate	Votes	%	±%
Labor	William McKenzie	5,754	58.3	+6.2
Country	Francis Minchin	3,335	33.8	−5.5
Communist	Ralph Gibson	786	8.0	+8.0
Total formal votes		9,875	99.0	−0.1
Informal votes		104	1.0	+0.1
Turnout		9,979	95.5	+0.7
Two-party-preferred result
Labor	William McKenzie		64.6	+10.6
Country	Francis Minchin		35.4	−10.6
Labor hold		Swing	+10.6	

- Two party preferred vote was estimated.

1932 Victorian state election: Wonthaggi
Party	Candidate	Votes	%	±%
Labor	William McKenzie	5,191	52.1	−47.9
Country	Francis Minchin	3,910	39.3	+39.3
Independent	William Easton	855	8.6	+8.6
Total formal votes		9,956	99.1	
Informal votes		93	0.9	
Turnout		10,049	94.8	
Two-party-preferred result
Labor	William McKenzie		54.0	−46.0
Country	Francis Minchin		46.0	+46.0
Labor hold		Swing	N/A	

- Two party preferred vote was estimated.

=== Elections in the 1920s ===
1929 Victorian state election: Wonthaggi
Party	Candidate	Votes	%	±%
Labor	William McKenzie	unopposed		
Labor hold		Swing		

1927 Victorian state election: Wonthaggi
Party	Candidate	Votes	%	±%
Labor	William McKenzie	4,548	52.4	
Country	Herbert Hyland	1,654	18.9	
Country	Peter Hudson	1,123	12.8	
Nationalist	William Walker	876	10.0	
Australian Liberal	William Easton	509	5.8	
Total formal votes		8,746	97.4	
Informal votes		237	2.6	
Turnout		8,983	93.0	
Labor hold		Swing		

- Preferences were not distributed.
