= Electoral results for the district of Malvern =

Victoria, Australia, district election results

This is a list of electoral results for the Electoral district of Malvern in Victorian state elections.

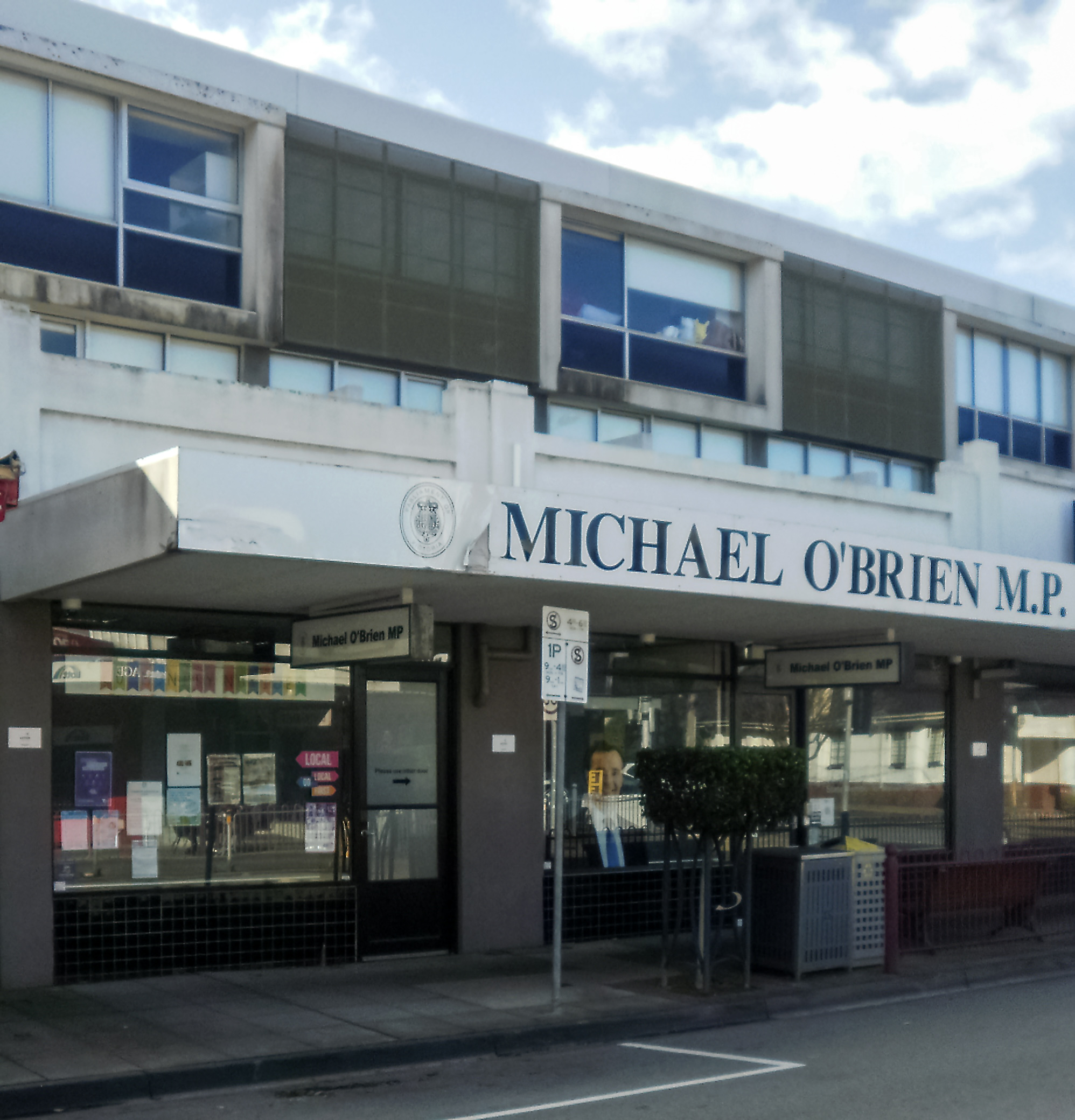
O'Brien's Electoral Office in Malvern East

== Members for Malvern ==
Member	Party	Term
Trevor Oldham	Liberal	1945–1953
Sir John Bloomfield	Liberal	1953–1970
Lindsay Thompson	Liberal	1970–1982
Geoff Leigh	Liberal	1982–1992
Robert Doyle	Liberal	1992–2006
Michael O'Brien	Liberal	2006–present

== Election results ==
=== Elections in the 2020s ===
2022 Victorian state election: Malvern
Party	Candidate	Votes	%	±%
Liberal	Michael O'Brien	20,768	52.8	+1.5
Labor	Darren Natale	10,266	26.1	−3.4
Greens	Mitchell Fuller	6,137	15.6	+2.5
Animal Justice	Amelia Natoli	960	2.5	−0.4
Independent	Steve Stefanopoulos	602	1.5	+1.5
Family First	Judy Schmidt	601	1.5	+1.5
Total formal votes		40,801	97.3	+1.3
Informal votes		1,136	2.7	−1.3
Turnout		41,937	89.5	
Two-party-preferred result
Liberal	Michael O'Brien	22,957	58.4	+2.4
Labor	Darren Natale	16,326	41.6	−2.4
Liberal hold		Swing	+2.4	

=== Elections in the 2010s ===
2018 Victorian state election: Malvern
Party	Candidate	Votes	%	±%
Liberal	Michael O'Brien	19,003	51.25	−11.38
Labor	Oliver Squires	11,141	30.05	+8.66
Greens	Polly Morgan	4,659	12.56	−3.42
Sustainable Australia	Michaela Moran	1,161	3.13	+3.13
Animal Justice	Candace Feild	1,116	3.01	+3.01
Total formal votes		37,080	96.06	+0.08
Informal votes		1,522	3.94	−0.08
Turnout		38,602	89.99	−2.54
Two-party-preferred result
Liberal	Michael O'Brien	20,814	56.10	−10.15
Labor	Oliver Squires	16,285	43.90	+10.15
Liberal hold		Swing	−10.15	

2014 Victorian state election: Malvern
Party	Candidate	Votes	%	±%
Liberal	Michael O'Brien	22,642	62.6	−2.8
Labor	Les Tarczon	7,730	21.4	+2.0
Greens	James Bennett	5,780	16.0	+1.9
Total formal votes		36,152	96.0	−0.9
Informal votes		1,515	4.0	+0.9
Turnout		37,667	92.5	+2.2
Two-party-preferred result
Liberal	Michael O'Brien	23,958	66.3	−4.3
Labor	Les Tarczon	12,205	33.7	+4.3
Liberal hold		Swing	−4.3	

2010 Victorian state election: Malvern
Party	Candidate	Votes	%	±%
Liberal	Michael O'Brien	22,160	65.29	+8.41
Labor	Nick Voulanas	6,584	19.40	−7.75
Greens	Sam Hibbins	4,807	14.16	+1.60
Family First	Miranda de la Masse-Homsy	390	1.15	−0.39
Total formal votes		33,941	96.84	−0.19
Informal votes		1,109	3.16	+0.19
Turnout		35,050	92.73	+6.01
Two-party-preferred result
Liberal	Michael O'Brien	23,881	70.44	+9.12
Labor	Nick Voulanas	10,023	29.56	−9.12
Liberal hold		Swing	+9.12	

=== Elections in the 2000s ===
2006 Victorian state election: Malvern
Party	Candidate	Votes	%	±%
Liberal	Michael O'Brien	17,927	56.9	+1.8
Labor	Paul Vout	8,555	27.1	−2.7
Greens	Tania Giles	3,959	12.6	−0.8
People Power	Deborah Holmes	590	1.9	+1.9
Family First	Ann Grauer	484	1.5	+1.5
Total formal votes		31,515	97.0	−0.4
Informal votes		964	3.0	+0.4
Turnout		32,479	86.7	
Two-party-preferred result
Liberal	Michael O'Brien	19,313	61.3	+1.1
Labor	Paul Vout	12,180	38.7	−1.1
Liberal hold		Swing	+1.1	

2002 Victorian state election: Malvern
Party	Candidate	Votes	%	±%
Liberal	Robert Doyle	18,036	55.1	−10.8
Labor	Rolf Sorensen	9,758	29.8	−4.0
Greens	Robert Trafficante	4,389	13.4	+13.3
Independent	Norman Pollack	524	1.6	+1.6
Total formal votes		32,707	97.4	−0.4
Informal votes		874	2.6	+0.4
Turnout		33,581	91.6	
Two-party-preferred result
Liberal	Robert Doyle	19,669	60.2	−5.9
Labor	Rolf Sorensen	13,014	39.8	+5.9
Liberal hold		Swing	−5.9	

=== Elections in the 1990s ===
1999 Victorian state election: Malvern
Party	Candidate	Votes	%	±%
Liberal	Robert Doyle	21,129	66.6	+0.2
Labor	Jude Wallace	10,583	33.4	+2.8
Total formal votes		31,712	97.8	−0.3
Informal votes		697	2.2	+0.3
Turnout		32,409	90.2	
Liberal hold		Swing	−1.0	

1996 Victorian state election: Malvern
Party	Candidate	Votes	%	±%
Liberal	Robert Doyle	20,990	66.4	−2.3
Labor	Gabriel Hermes	9,667	30.6	+6.6
Natural Law	Robert Johnson	933	3.0	−4.4
Total formal votes		31,590	98.2	+1.0
Informal votes		581	1.8	−1.0
Turnout		32,171	92.3	
Two-party-preferred result
Liberal	Robert Doyle	21,349	67.6	−4.9
Labor	Gabriel Hermes	10,215	32.4	+4.9
Liberal hold		Swing	−4.9	

1992 Victorian state election: Malvern
Party	Candidate	Votes	%	±%
Liberal	Robert Doyle	21,065	68.7	+5.6
Labor	Anthony van der Craats	7,342	24.0	−12.5
Natural Law	Lesley Mendelson	2,243	7.3	+7.3
Total formal votes		30,650	97.2	+0.4
Informal votes		876	2.8	−0.4
Turnout		31,526	93.3	
Two-party-preferred result
Liberal	Robert Doyle	22,196	72.5	+9.2
Labor	Anthony van der Craats	8,426	27.5	−9.2
Liberal hold		Swing	+9.2	

=== Elections in the 1980s ===
1988 Victorian state election: Malvern
Party	Candidate	Votes	%	±%
Liberal	Geoff Leigh	15,429	61.95	+2.14
Labor	Philip Cottier	9,478	38.05	−2.14
Total formal votes		24,907	96.81	−0.90
Informal votes		820	3.19	+0.90
Turnout		25,727	89.91	−1.05
Liberal hold		Swing	+2.14	

1985 Victorian state election: Malvern
Party	Candidate	Votes	%	±%
Liberal	Geoff Leigh	15,920	59.8	+4.3
Labor	Max Dumais	10,697	40.2	+2.8
Total formal votes		26,617	97.7	
Informal votes		624	2.3	
Turnout		27,241	2.3	
Liberal hold		Swing	+0.5	

1982 Malvern state by-election
Party	Candidate	Votes	%	±%
Liberal	Geoff Leigh	12,950	60.5	−0.3
Labor	Rodney Charls	6,747	31.5	−1.2
Democrats	Joseph Serve	1,390	6.5	+1.4
Independent	Peter Allan	311	1.5	+1.5
Total formal votes		21,398	98.2	0.0
Informal votes		393	1.8	0.0
Turnout		21,791	80.0	−12.4
Two-party-preferred result
Liberal	Geoff Leigh		64.0	+0.4
Labor	Rodney Charls		36.0	−0.4
Liberal hold		Swing	+0.4	

1982 Victorian state election: Malvern
Party	Candidate	Votes	%	±%
Liberal	Lindsay Thompson	14,980	60.8	+1.0
Labor	Kenneth Penaluna	8,068	32.7	0.0
Democrats	Brian Stockton	1,259	5.1	+5.1
Independent	Joseph McCarthy	333	1.4	+1.4
Total formal votes		24,640	98.2	+0.4
Informal votes		455	1.8	−0.4
Turnout		25,095	92.4	−2.2
Two-party-preferred result
Liberal	Lindsay Thompson	15,682	63.6	−1.4
Labor	Kenneth Penaluna	8,958	36.4	+1.4
Liberal hold		Swing	−1.4	

=== Elections in the 1970s ===
1979 Victorian state election: Malvern
Party	Candidate	Votes	%	±%
Liberal	Lindsay Thompson	15,167	59.7	−6.0
Labor	Kenneth Penaluna	8,295	32.7	+4.1
Independent	Martin Cahill	1,921	7.6	+7.6
Total formal votes		25,383	97.8	−0.2
Informal votes		560	2.2	+0.2
Turnout		25,943	90.2	−0.3
Two-party-preferred result
Liberal	Lindsay Thompson	16,506	65.0	−5.8
Labor	Kenneth Penaluna	8,875	35.0	+5.8
Liberal hold		Swing	−5.8	

1976 Victorian state election: Malvern
Party	Candidate	Votes	%	±%
Liberal	Lindsay Thompson	17,225	65.7	+6.6
Labor	Evelyn Watson	7,496	28.6	−3.8
Democratic Labor	John Cotter	1,503	5.7	−0.7
Total formal votes		26,224	98.0	
Informal votes		530	2.0	
Turnout		26,754	90.5	
Two-party-preferred result
Liberal	Lindsay Thompson	18,578	70.8	+5.0
Labor	Evelyn Watson	7,646	29.2	−5.0
Liberal hold		Swing	+5.0	

1973 Victorian state election: Malvern
Party	Candidate	Votes	%	±%
Liberal	Lindsay Thompson	16,219	65.9	+5.3
Labor	Andrew Homer	7,132	29.0	−0.3
Democratic Labor	Edward Preece	1,276	5.2	−4.9
Total formal votes		24,627	97.9	+0.6
Informal votes		519	2.1	−0.6
Turnout		25,146	90.8	+0.2
Two-party-preferred result
Liberal	Lindsay Thompson	17,303	70.3	+1.1
Labor	Andrew Homer	7,324	29.7	−1.1
Liberal hold		Swing	+1.1	

1970 Victorian state election: Malvern
Party	Candidate	Votes	%	±%
Liberal	Lindsay Thompson	13,801	60.6	−3.0
Labor	Christopher Gaffney	6,670	29.3	+5.4
Democratic Labor	Thomas O'Reilly	2,303	10.1	−2.4
Total formal votes		22,774	97.3	−0.1
Informal votes		624	2.7	+0.1
Turnout		23,398	90.6	−0.5
Two-party-preferred result
Liberal	Lindsay Thompson	15,759	69.2	−5.0
Labor	Christopher Gaffney	7,015	30.8	+5.0
Liberal hold		Swing	−5.0	

=== Elections in the 1960s ===
1967 Victorian state election: Malvern
Party	Candidate	Votes	%	±%
Liberal	John Bloomfield	14,703	63.6	−2.3
Labor	Thomas Evans	5,522	23.9	+0.6
Democratic Labor	John Olle	2,896	12.5	+1.6
Total formal votes		23,121	97.4	
Informal votes		610	2.6	
Turnout		23,731	91.1	
Two-party-preferred result
Liberal	John Bloomfield	17,164	74.2	−1.0
Labor	Thomas Evans	5,957	25.8	+1.0
Liberal hold		Swing	−1.0	

1964 Victorian state election: Malvern
Party	Candidate	Votes	%	±%
Liberal and Country	John Bloomfield	11,148	65.7	+2.4
Labor	Adrianus Knulst	3,859	22.7	+0.7
Democratic Labor	James Harkin	1,971	11.6	−3.2
Total formal votes		16,978	98.1	+0.3
Informal votes		321	1.9	−0.3
Turnout		17,299	91.2	+0.1
Two-party-preferred result
Liberal and Country	John Bloomfield	12,824	75.5	−0.3
Labor	Adrianus Knulst	4,154	24.5	+0.3
Liberal and Country hold		Swing	−0.3	

1961 Victorian state election: Malvern
Party	Candidate	Votes	%	±%
Liberal and Country	John Bloomfield	10,775	63.3	−6.2
Labor	James McGarvin	3,737	22.0	+22.0
Democratic Labor	Thomas Canty	2,513	14.8	+14.8
Total formal votes		17,025	97.8	+2.7
Informal votes		379	2.2	−2.7
Turnout		17,404	91.1	−0.1
Two-party-preferred result
Liberal and Country	John Bloomfield	13,011	75.8	−1.2
Labor	James McGarvin	4,014	24.2	+1.2
Liberal and Country hold		Swing	−1.2	

=== Elections in the 1950s ===
1958 Victorian state election: Malvern
Party	Candidate	Votes	%	±%
Liberal and Country	John Bloomfield	12,109	69.5	
Independent	Mascotte Brown	5,306	30.5	
Total formal votes		17,415	95.1	
Informal votes		896	4.9	
Turnout		18,311	91.2	
Liberal and Country hold		Swing		

1955 Victorian state election: Malvern
Party	Candidate	Votes	%	±%
Liberal and Country	John Bloomfield	11,440	70.5	
Victorian Liberal	Mascotte Brown	4,796	29.5	
Total formal votes		16,236	95.4	
Informal votes		779	4.6	
Turnout		17,015	91.1	
Liberal and Country hold		Swing		

1953 Malvern state by-election
Party	Candidate	Votes	%	±%
Liberal and Country	John Bloomfield	8,915	49.4	+13.0
Electoral Reform	William Dawnay-Mould	4,049	22.5	+2.6
Independent Labor	George Bradley	2,834	15.7	+15.7
Independent	Mascotte Brown	2,228	12.4	+12.4
Total formal votes		18,036	97.7	+0.1
Informal votes		422	2.3	−0.1
Turnout		18,458	86.2	−5.8
Liberal and Country	John Bloomfield	9,394	52.1	N/A
Electoral Reform	William Dawnay-Mould	5,482	30.4	N/A
Independent Labor	George Bradley	3,160	17.5	N/A
Liberal and Country hold		Swing	N/A	

- Preferences were not fully distributed.

1952 Victorian state election: Malvern
Party	Candidate	Votes	%	±%
Liberal and Country	Trevor Oldham	7,081	36.5	−21.4
Labor	Francis Gaffy	6,589	33.9	+0.8
Electoral Reform	Reginald Schilling	3,956	20.4	+20.4
Independent	Mascotte Brown	1,788	9.2	+0.1
Total formal votes		19,414	97.6	−1.0
Informal votes		475	2.4	+1.0
Turnout		19,889	92.0	−0.7
Two-party-preferred result
Liberal and Country	Trevor Oldham	11,487	59.2	−5.9
Labor	Francis Gaffy	7,927	40.8	+5.9
Liberal and Country hold		Swing	−5.9	

1950 Victorian state election: Malvern
Party	Candidate	Votes	%	±%
Liberal and Country	Trevor Oldham	11,949	57.9	−5.1
Labor	Alexander Cahill	6,828	33.1	+33.1
Independent	Coralie Brown	1,868	9.0	−5.2
Total formal votes		20,645	98.6	+3.3
Informal votes		292	1.4	−3.3
Turnout		20,937	92.7	+2.4
Two-party-preferred result
Liberal and Country	Trevor Oldham	13,439	65.1	−5.0
Labor	Alexander Cahill	7,206	34.9	+34.9
Liberal and Country hold		Swing	N/A	

=== Elections in the 1940s ===
1947 Victorian state election: Malvern
Party	Candidate	Votes	%	±%
Liberal	Trevor Oldham	13,001	63.0	−37.0
Independent Liberal	Andrew Sinclair	4,703	22.8	+22.8
Independent	Mascotte Brown	2,984	14.2	+14.2
Total formal votes		20,648	95.3	
Informal votes		1,025	4.7	
Turnout		21,673	90.3	
Liberal hold		Swing	N/A	

- Preferences were not distributed.

1945 Victorian state election: Malvern
Party	Candidate	Votes	%	±%
Liberal	Trevor Oldham	unopposed		
Liberal hold		Swing		
