= Flashman =

Flashman or Flash Man may refer to:

- Harry Flashman, a character in the 1857 novel Tom Brown's School Days by Thomas Hughes
  - The Flashman Papers, a series of novels by George MacDonald Fraser based on the Hughes character
    - Flashman (novel), a 1969 novel by Fraser and the first of the Flashman Papers series
- Flashman (film), a 1967 Italian film
- Choushinsei Flashman, a Japanese television series and the 10th Super Sentai series
- Flash Man, an enemy in the video game Mega Man 2
- Flashman, a British group formed by Gerald Masters, Nick Walpole and Chris Hudman; and their 1977 debut album
- Ann Flashman (1911–1969), Australian veterinarian
