= The Port Melbourne Standard =

Former newspaper in Melbourne, Victoria

The Standard was a weekly newspaper published in Port Melbourne from 1883 to 1914, and as The Port Melbourne Standard from 1914 to 1920.

== History ==
The paper's original offices were in Bay Street, Port Melbourne. Alf M. Stevens was the editor and manager till February 1888, when it was taken over by Philip Salmon, previously of the (Footscray) Advertiser.

In October 1888 Salmon and Stevens disposed of the paper to Alfred Gagan, publisher of the Williamstown Advertiser.

From Vol.XI No.578 (13 October 1894) its banner was subtitled "With which is incorporated the Port Melbourne Tribune"

== Digitization ==
The National Library of Australia has digitized photographic copies of most issues of The Standard from Vol. 1 No.46 (24 May 1884) to Vol. 28 No.21 (23 May 1914) and The Port Melbourne Standard Vol. 28 No.22 (30 May 1914) to Vol.34 No.9 (28 February 1920) as part of the Australian Newspapers Digitisation Project.
