= Arthur Rylah Institute for Environmental Research =

Australian biodiversity research organization

- Purpose: Conservation, Animal Welfare and Biodiversity
- Location: Heidelberg, Melbourne, Australia
- Coordinates: 37.7523°S 145.0620°E
- Method: Research
- Key people: Dr Kim Lowe
- Employees: 65
- Website: https://www.ari.vic.gov.au/

The Arthur Rylah Institute for Environmental Research (ARI) is the biodiversity research organisation for the government of Victoria, Australia. It provides advice on ecologically sustainable land and water management issues and with regard to threatened native flora and fauna. It is named after Sir Arthur Rylah, a long-serving Victorian politician and deputy state premier between 1955 and 1971.

== History ==
Arthur Rylah Institute for Environmental Research (ARI) was officially opened by Queen Elizabeth II on 8 April 1970 as part of the Fisheries and Wildlife Division of the Victorian state government. The foundation Director was Alfred Dunbavin Butcher, who also had an association with Melbourne Zoo and Healesville Sanctuary. He had a keen interest in art and this attracted a large collection of wildlife art and the commissioning of a large mural at the institute. The institute was subsequently incorporated into various Victorian Government Departments since then including the Ministry for Conservation, the Department of Conservation Forests and Lands, the Department of Sustainability and Environment; and is currently (2017) in the Department of Environment Land Water and Planning.

== Publications ==
There have been many published reports, journal articles, book sections, books, theses and conference proceedings from the ARI releasing information about scientific research on plants and animals.

=== ARI Publication List ===
- 2002–2004
- July 2004 – June 2005
- July 2005 – June 2006
- July 2006 – December 2006
- 2007
- 2008
- 2009
- 2010
- 2011
- 2012

=== Annual Report ===
The ARI annual report summarises key activities and research completed that have importance in changing the way Australian fauna and flora thrive in 21st century environments.
