= Owen Sinclair =

Australian politician

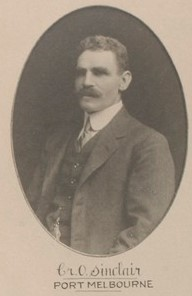
- Born: 13 November 1862; Port Melbourne
- Died: 17 June 1927 (aged 64); Port Melbourne
- Occupation: Australian politician
- Spouse: Emma Margaret Hudson

Owen Sinclair (13 November 1862 – 17 June 1927) was an Australian politician. He was a member of the Victorian Legislative Assembly from 1915 to 1917, representing Port Melbourne for the Australian Labor Party and then as an independent.

He was born in Port Melbourne to sugar boiler Charles Sinclair and Sarah Duff. He worked as a glassblower, for the Victorian Railways and as a tobacconist in Bay Street, Port Melbourne. On 27 December 1887 he married Emma Margaret Hudson, with whom he had three children. In 1894, he pled guilty to charges associated with running an illegal betting operation out of his tobacconist shop and was fined. In 1915, the Port Melbourne Standard wrote that he was "by trade a flint glass maker" but did "not now follow that calling, as he is a man of independent means".

Sinclair had a long and prominent involvement in community and sporting roles in the Port Melbourne area. He served on Port Melbourne City Council from 1906 until his death, but reportedly declined the mayoralty as it came with an expectation of appointment as justice of the peace, and Sinclair did not wish to pass sentence on people. He was also a commissioner of the Melbourne Harbour Trust and member of the Melbourne Tramway Trust, chairman of Nott Street State School committee, and captain of the local fire brigade for many years, in which capacity he was seriously burned in an 1885 explosion at the Forresters Arms Hotel. Sinclair was also a keen sportsman, being a successful cricketer and footballer at local level, founder and trustee of the Port Melbourne Swimming Club, and for 17 years was a delegate of the Port Melbourne Football Club to the Victorian Football Association, becoming a life member of the Association.

In 1915, Sinclair was elected unopposed to the Victorian Legislative Assembly as the endorsed Labor candidate in a by-election for the seat of Port Melbourne following the death of MP George Sangster. He lost Labor preselection for the 1917 election to James Murphy, then resigned from the party in an unsuccessful bid for re-election as an independent.

He later unsuccessfully contested the 1920 election as a "Democratic" candidate on a platform of free medical services for the poor, having the Chief Justice of the Supreme Court fill the role of Governor to save money, state-controlled railway works and granaries, free primary, secondary and tertiary education and the abolition of the Legislative Council.

Sinclair died at his home in Graham Street, Port Melbourne, in 1927 and was buried at the Melbourne General Cemetery. Flags were flown at half-mast at Victorian Football Association games that weekend, and a memorial tablet was later installed at the Port Melbourne Town Hall.

Victorian Legislative Assembly
Preceded by George Sangster	Member for Port Melbourne; 1915–1917	Succeeded by James Murphy
