= William McKenzie (Australian politician) =

Australian politician

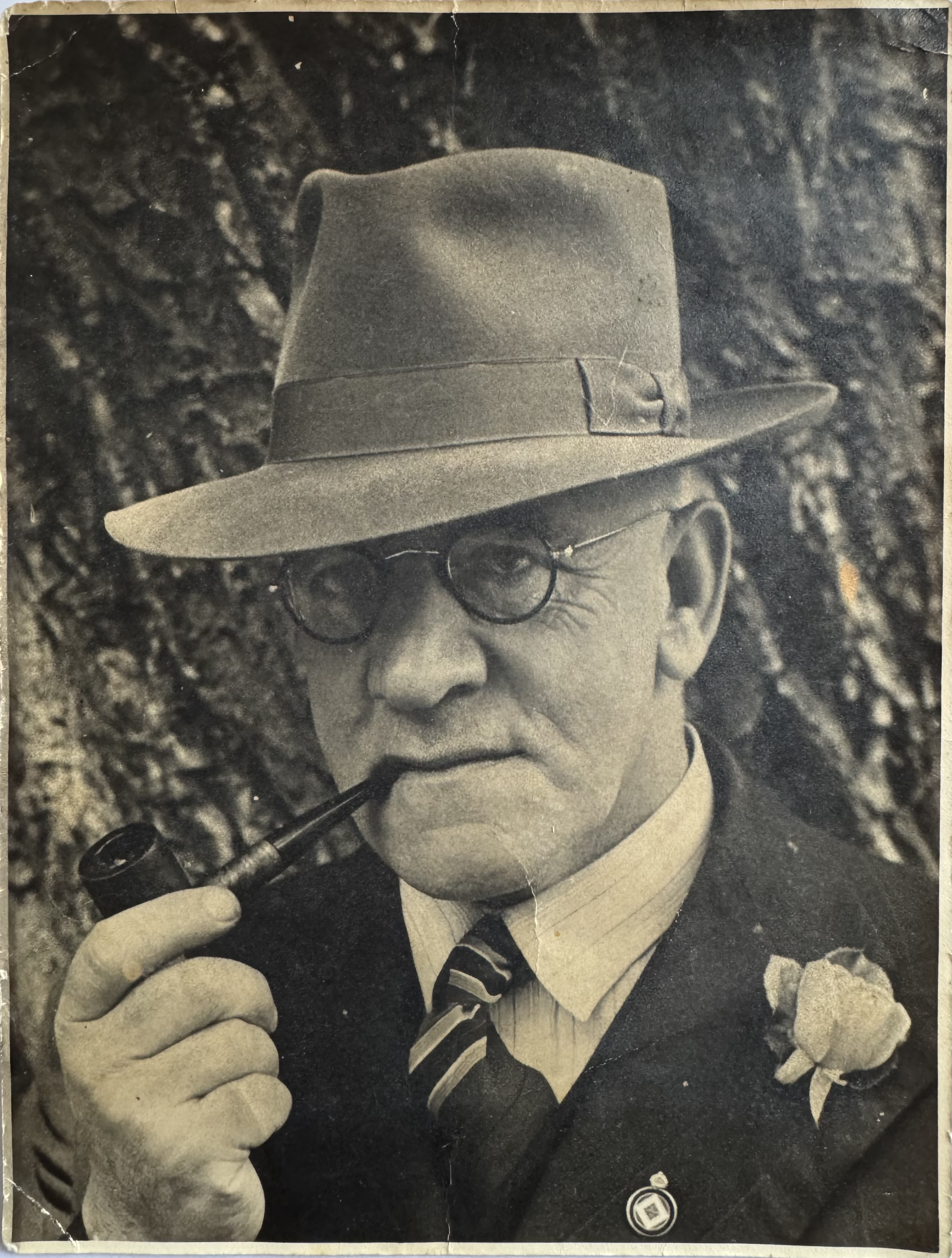
William McKenzie (1947)

William George Alexander McKenzie OBE (3 December 1883 – 4 February 1969) was an Australian politician.

He was born in Woodend to hotel-keeper Henry Daniel McKenzie and Elizabeth Perry. He was educated at Wesley College. Melbourne. On 23 June 1914 he married Mary Germaine, in Woodend, with whom he had three children. After the birth of his first child Joyce in Kyneton, he moved with his family to Wonthaggi, Victoria, where he worked for a time as a clerk at the State owned coal mine. From around 1922 he kept a general store at Wonthaggi, and also invested in gold. He served on the Borough of Wonthaggi Council from 1924 to 1952, and was also founding president of the Woodend branch of the Labor Party.

In 1927 he was elected to the Victorian Legislative Assembly for Wonthaggi. He was briefly Minister of Agriculture and Mines in 1943, and resumed the portfolio from 21 November 1945 to 20 November 1947. McKenzie was defeated in October 1947, and was subsequently a member of the Council of Adult Education 1950–1953; he was also appointed an Officer of the Order of the British Empire. He died at Oakleigh on 4 February 1969.

Victorian Legislative Assembly
New seat	Member for Wonthaggi; 1927–1947	Succeeded by William Buckingham
