= George Sangster (politician) =

Scottish-born Australian politician

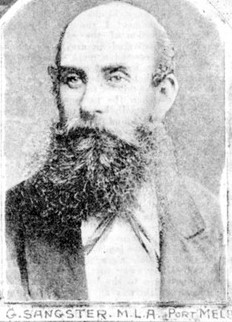
George Sangster

George Sangster (23 June 1845 – 8 April 1915) was a Scottish-born Australian politician. He was a member of the Victorian Legislative Assembly from 1894 until his death in 1915, representing the electorate of Port Melbourne for the Australian Labor Party (1894-1902), as an Independent Labor member (1902-1905) and again as an endorsed Labor member (1905-1915).

== Career prior to politics ==
He was born in Woodside, Aberdeen, the son of mill manager Andrew Sangster. He left school at the age of nine and worked in the J. J. Crosbie & Co woolen mills and as a railway engine cleaner based out of Macduff (Banff) railway station. In 1867, he went to work as a seaman (naval fireman) for Allan Line Royal Mail Steamers, primarily on routes between England and North America. In May 1870, he migrated to Melbourne on the steamship Great Britain. He largely worked in Australian and trans-Tasman coastal shipping during the 1870s and early 1880s, apart from stints at the Fitzroy Gasworks and as an enginedriver for the Victoria Ice Company. From the mid-1880s, he was an enginedriver at Newport Freezing Works for four years, then manager of the Williamstown shed of wool and stevedoring firm Close and Lawrence, and finally enginedriver for the Kimpton and Son flour mill at Kensington until his election as Seamen's Union secretary in 1893. In 1880 he married Sarah Gertrude Bourke, with whom he had four children.

== Union and local government involvement ==
Sangster was an early member of the Seamen's Union of Australia and in 1880 went to New Zealand to assist in organising on behalf of the union there, successfully organising workers in Auckland, Port Chalmers and Wellington before returning six months later. He became the union's delegate to the Melbourne Trades Hall Council in 1888, secretary of the Seamen's Union in January 1893, vice-president of the Trades Hall Council in December 1893 and president of the Trades Hall Council in June 1894. He was the first representative of unskilled labour to become President of the Trades Hall Council. He was also a member of the Town of Port Melbourne council from 1893 to 1894.

== Political career ==
In 1894 he was elected to the Victorian Legislative Assembly for Port Melbourne, representing the fledgling Labour Party. In 1895, he was chairman of the Intercolonial Seamen's Conference in Brisbane.

In May 1902, he was expelled by the Port Melbourne Labor Party over a controversial loan he had borrowed from the Seamen's Union and later repaid. The state Political Labor Council passed a motion sympathising with Sangster, but he remained in parliament as an independent Labor MP, continuing to be a reliable Labor vote outside caucus. The Port Melbourne seat absorbed much of the abolished seat of Emerald Hill for the 1904 election, and Sangster did not contest Labor preselection, which was won by Emerald Hill MP Thomas Smith. Sangster contested and won the seat as an independent Labor candidate, defeating Smith. He was readmitted to the party in late 1905.

Sangster died in office from pneumonia on 8 April 1915 while on a holiday in Sydney in an attempt to improve his health. He had been in poor health in later years, and while he continued to regularly attend parliament, it was reported upon his death that he had "not taken an active part in debates for nearly ten years". He was accorded a state funeral and was buried at the Melbourne General Cemetery.

Victorian Legislative Assembly
Preceded by Philip Salmon	Member for Port Melbourne; 1894–1915	Succeeded by Owen Sinclair
