= James Laurence Murphy =

Australian politician

James Laurence Murphy (c. 1860 – 17 February 1942) was an Irish-born Australian politician.

Murphy was born in County Cork to farmer Laurence Murphy and Mary Flynn. In the early 1880s he migrated to Victoria, and worked as a traveller before becoming a cordial manufacturer in the early 1890s, after going into partnership with cordial manufacturer Joseph Plummer as Plummer, Murphy & Co. On 11 January 1892 he married schoolteacher Margaret O'Flaherty.

A member of the Labor Party, he served on South Melbourne City Council from 1904 to 1942, and was mayor from 1910 to 1911. He was South Melbourne representative on the Harbour Trust from 1910 to 1913.

In 1917 he was elected to the Victorian Legislative Assembly for Port Melbourne after successfully challenging incumbent MP Owen Sinclair for Labor preselection, and represented the seat until his death. He was credited with key roles in the establishment of the Fair Rents Court, having repeatedly tried to introduce a private member's bill for many years prior to its adoption by his government, as well as in the development of housing at Fishermans Bend. Alongside his parliamentary role, he was a member of the Metropolitan Fire Brigades Board from 1940 to his death and its chairman in 1941.

He died at his South Melbourne home in February 1942 after a short illness, and was buried at Melbourne General Cemetery.

Victorian Legislative Assembly
Preceded by Owen Sinclair	Member for Port Melbourne; 1917–1942	Succeeded by Tom Corrigan
