= Richard Gainey =

Australian politician (1890–1975)

Richard John Gainey MBE (4 September 1890 – 15 July 1975) was an Australian politician.

He was born in Eaglehawk to farmer John Gainey and May Salter. He attended Melbourne Continuation School and became a schoolteacher at Glenhope until 1916, when he enlisted in the AIF. He was a gunner in France and Belgium, and was wounded and gassed in 1918. He returned to teaching in 1919, and on 18 September 1927 married Evelyn Alice Aitken, with whom he had a daughter. He was the head teacher at Abbotsford State School, and was the president of the Returned Soldier Teachers of Victoria and also significant in the Returned and Services League. He had been a founding member of the Gould League in 1907 and was appointed a Member of the Order of the British Empire for his charity work. In 1955 he was elected to the Victorian Legislative Assembly as the Liberal and Country Party member for Elsternwick. A backbencher, he opposed live trap shooting and pesticide use. His seat was abolished in 1967, and he lost preselection to contest another seat, retiring from politics. Gainey died at Heidelberg in 1975.

Victorian Legislative Assembly
Preceded by John Don	Member for Elsternwick; 1955–1967	Abolished
