= Gerald Masters =

- Gerald Masters' 1981 album

Background information
- Born: Gerald Watkiss; 17 February 1955; Wolverhampton, England
- Died: 5 February 2007 (aged 51) Shrewsbury, England
- Genres: Pop
- Occupations: Musician, singer, recording artist, composer, producer.
- Instruments: Vocals, Piano
- Years active: 1977–2007
- Labels: Pye, Handshake, Island
- Website: http://www.geraldmasters.com

Gerald Masters born Gerald Eric Watkiss (February 17, 1955 – February 5, 2007) was a musician, solo artist and songwriter, achieving fame during the late seventies and early eighties.

Gerald Watkiss trained at the Royal Welsh College of Music and Drama graduating in 1977. Whilst at college, he formed his first band.

After releasing four albums, produced by Tony Atkins, as a solo artist between 1977 and 1983, he continued in the music business working as a producer/writer with Island, working with artists including Andy Gibb, Neville Staples and The Equators. Following this work, he struck up writing partnerships with Aziz Ibrahim (Ex-Simply Red, Stone Roses) and Paul Beard (James Blunt, Robbie Williams, Leona Lewis). In 2006, Masters decided to write and release his own material again, under the name Rescue Party, a collaboration with fellow co-writer and producer Gareth Rhys Jones.

Additionally, Masters was a writer for TV, most notably composing "A Handful of Smarties", which aired in the UK.

== Discography ==
=== Albums ===
| Artist | Title | Release date | Label |
|---|---|---|---|
| Flashman | Flashman | 1977 | Pye/ Vanguard |
| Gerald Watkiss | Purgatory and Paradise | 1978 | Pye |
| Gerald Masters | Past Masters | 1980 | Precision |
| Gerald Masters | Gerald Masters | 1981 | Handshake |
| Gerald Masters | Music For A Living Room | 1983 | Metronome |
| Rescue Party | Imaginary America | 2006 | AWAL |
| Gerald Masters | Dreamtime | 2010 | AWAL |
| Gerald Masters | Strike A Light | 2011 | AWAL |
| Gerald Masters | Terminal Life | 2012 | AWAL |

=== Singles ===
| Artist | Title | Release date | Label |
|---|---|---|---|
| Flashman | Tears | 1977 | Pye |
| Gerald Watkiss | Hold On / If The Line Broke On My World | 1978 | Pye |
| Gerald Masters | E.S.P. / Johnny Can't Work Any Faster | 1979 | Pye |
| Gerald Masters | Falling / Purgatory and Paradise | 1979 | Pye |
| Gerald Masters | Poor Little Rich Boy / Is It Me? | 1980 | Handshake |
| Gerald Masters | I Love You So Badly / Too Many Dreams Were Broken | 1981 | Handshake |
| Gerald Masters | In The Movies / Every Step That I Take | 1983 | Metronome |
| Bobby Perfect and the Good Guys | Only Love Charlie Boy / Palace Stomp | 1983 | Crown Records |
| Mata | On Your Bikes / Don't Look Now | 1983 | Savoir Faire |
| Gerald Masters | Solidarność | 2013 | AWAL |
| Rescue Party | A Darkened Love | 2014 | AWAL |
| Gerald Masters | Change Your Heart | 2015 | AWAL |
| Gerald Masters | Weakness in the Words | 2016 | AWAL |
| Gerald Masters | Whose Planet | 2017 | AWAL |
