= 1952 Port Melbourne state by-election =

A by-election for the seat of Port Melbourne in the Victorian Legislative Assembly was held on Saturday 15 March 1952. The by-election was triggered by the death of Labor member Tom Corrigan on 19 January 1952.

The candidates were Stan Corrigan (Tom Corrigan's son) for the Labor Party, William Bird (secretary of the Melbourne branch of the Seamen's Union) for the Communist Party, and Kenneth Cole for the Liberal and Country Party. Labor retained the seat with Corrigan winning by a large majority.

== Results ==
Port Melbourne state by-election, 1952
Party	Candidate	Votes	%	±%
Labor	Stan Corrigan	16,353	78.93	+2.78
Liberal and Country	Kenneth Cole	2,730	13.18	−5.60
Communist	William Bird	1,636	7.90	+2.82
Total formal votes		20,719	97.95	−0.03
Informal votes		433	2.05	+0.03
Turnout		21,152	84.0	−9.0
Labor hold		Swing	+2.78	
