= Philip Salmon =

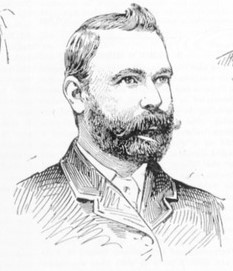

Philip Melville Salmon (16 November 1849 – 7 July 1909) was an Australian politician. He was a member of the Victorian Legislative Assembly from 1892 to 1894, representing the electorate of Port Melbourne.

== Business and journalistic career ==
Salmon was born in England. His family migrated to Victoria around 1861 and settled in Bendigo for several years before relocating to Port Melbourne. He worked at the sugar works, then worked as an auctioneer for a firm in Bay Street. He later moved to Footscray, where he was an auctioneer and real estate agent and proprietor of The Footscray Advertiser newspaper.

Salmon was a prominent member of both the Port Melbourne and Footscray communities, serving in a range of community organisations, including being a member of the Sandridge School Board of Advice, president of the Footscray United Cricket Club and Alberts Football Club and vice-president of the Footscray Rowing Club. He was a lieutenant in the Sandridge Artillery Corps and then Williamstown Artillery Corps of the Victorian Volunteer Forces and a captain in the Victorian Militia, but resigned his commission in 1884. He was the inaugural president of the Victorian Fellmongers' Union in 1884. He was an unsuccessful candidate for Footscray at the 1886 election.

In 1888, Salmon moved back to Port Melbourne and acquired Port Melbourne newspaper The Standard. He was Mayor of the Town of Port Melbourne in 1890–91.

== Term in parliament ==
He was elected to the Legislative Assembly for Port Melbourne at the 1892 election. He was endorsed by the Political Labor League, but broke with them after being elected. At his election, Salmon pledged to support the Shiels ministry but reserved the right to oppose individual measures. His policies included advocating "the nationalisation of land", the establishment of a state bank, the eight hour day, and introducing an absentee tax and a "moderate stock tax". Salmon voted against the successful ouster of the Shiels government in January 1893, and thereafter sat with the opposition.

From April to August 1893, as chairman of a parliamentary committee on fisheries, he took a trip to England, reportedly to enquire into the British fish trade and consult British authorities on methods for transporting fish with a view to further developing the Victorian fishing industry. He published a report in September following his return. In August 1893, he announced his opposition to an income tax, preferring a tax on unimproved land values and "a small charge on children attending the state schools at certain ages". In June 1894, despite being part of the opposition, he voted to support the Patterson government in a no-confidence vote.

In July 1894, Salmon vehemently opposed a women's suffrage bill, successfully filibustering the legislation and making a speech so offensive that Hansard refrained from publishing its full text and newspapers refused to even quote from it, with one newspaper describing the speech as "most disgusting from first to last". Salmon defended himself by saying that he "gave it in a more jocular mood" and that only 28 members had been present in the chamber at the time, while complaining that even his local newspaper The Standard (which he had previously owned) had not published the speech. The Victorian Women's Suffrage League passed a motion thanking him for his services to women's suffrage because his "noisy, vulgar and coarse" opposition had "convinced many persons" that women's suffrage was necessary to "secure a higher class of representatives."

In August 1894, he supported a property tax as the answer to the state's budgetary challenges, stating that the Patterson government's response to the 1890s depression would "mean the death blow of nearly every industry in the colony". Three weeks later, Salmon finished last in a failed attempt to regain his old Port Melbourne council seat, though he declared that he was "perfectly satisfied" with the result. He was absent from parliament, reputedly due to ill health, when the Patterson government was defeated on 30 August, forcing a general election. Salmon did not contest the 1894 election and retired, which he later claimed was due to the "embarrassments" of his financial position at the time.

== Life post-politics and death ==
After retiring from parliament, Salmon became an inspector for the Melbourne and Metropolitan Board of Works. He was declared insolvent in May 1895, but was released from insolvency in October. In May 1896, Salmon was reportedly "editing a small country paper". In June 1896, he testified at a parliamentary inquiry into the controversial collapse of the Mutual Benefit Society of Australasia, of which he had been a founding director. In January 1897, he was reported to be "trying to bring out a second evening paper in Melbourne".

Salmon died in 1909 and was buried at Footscray Cemetery.

Victorian Legislative Assembly
Preceded by Frederick Derham	Member for Port Melbourne; 1892–1894	Succeeded by George Sangster
