= Ann Flashman =

Australian veterinarian

Ann Flora Froude Flashman, Lady Rylah (1911 – 15 March 1969) was an Australian veterinarian. She was the first woman to enrol in the University of Sydney School of Veterinary Science and the first paid veterinarian at the Lort Smith Animal Hospital in North Melbourne which had previously been an honorary role held by Belle Bruce Reid.

== Veterinary career ==
Upon Flashman's graduation in 1935, where she was awarded the S.T.D. Symons Memorial Prize, she became the second woman to graduate from University of Sydney School of Veterinary Science, due to repeating a year, and the fourth woman in Australia to qualify as a veterinarian following Belle Bruce Reid, Margaret Gwendoline Keats and Patricia Littlejohn. After her relocation to Melbourne, Flashman became the third woman veterinarian in Victoria. From 1939 until her death in 1969, Flashman ran a private practice focused on treating cats, dogs and birds from her veterinary surgery and home which had been specially designed by the architectural firm of R.H. and M.H. King, and built by W. Davis, at 15 Victor Avenue, Kew.

== Publications ==
Flashman was a contributor to the Australian Veterinary Journal throughout her career writing as A. F. Flashman.

She was also the author of a number of books, Where Eagles Nested (1956), The Australian Pet Book (1962) and The Australian Dog Book (1971) under the pseudonym of John Wotherspoon and wrote a column, Pet Talk, in The Herald until the 1960s.

In 1963, she wrote Australian adventure: girl guiding under the Southern Cross under the name of Ann Rylah.

== Girl Guides ==
Flashman joined the Girl Guides in 1925. She was a lifelong member and supporter who held a number of roles, including Commissioner.

== Personal life ==
Flashman was born in Sydney and was the only daughter of Dr. James Froude Flashman and Irene Flora Flashman (née Dewar) and the sister of Dr. James Alan Froude Flashman.

She married Arthur Rylah in Melbourne on 10 September 1937 and they had two children, Annabel and Michael.

On March 15 1969 two employees of Ann Flashman found her unconscious in the back yard of her home in Kew. It appeared that she may have been assaulted.She died on the way to St Vincent's Hospital, Melbourne. A subsequent autopsy revealed her death was due to a subarachnoid haemorrhage. Her body was soon cremated. There has been speculation that she may have been murdered. "Mystery still surrounds death of Lady Rylah".

Following Flashman's death, her veterinary practice was continued by her daughter, Annabel Brownell, and her son-in-law, Lindsay Brownell, for thirty years.
