= Tom Corrigan (Australian politician) =

Australian politician

Member of the Victorian Legislative Assembly for Port Melbourne
- In office 18 April 1942 – 19 January 1952
- Preceded by: James Murphy
- Succeeded by: Stan Corrigan

Personal details
- Born: Thomas Patrick Corrigan; 17 February 1884 South Melbourne, Victoria
- Died: 19 January 1952 (aged 67) Fitzroy, Victoria, Australia
- Resting place: Melbourne General Cemetery
- Party: Labor Party
- Spouse: Emily Olive Angleton (m. 1907)
- Children: Stan Corrigan
- Occupation: Fitter and turner

Thomas Patrick Corrigan (17 February 1884 – 19 January 1952) was an Australian politician. He was an Australian Labor Party member of the Victorian Legislative Assembly from 1942 until his death in 1952, representing the seat of Port Melbourne.

Corrigan was born in South Melbourne, Victoria to Irish labourer Patrick Corrigan and his wife Mary Jane Edwards. He worked as a fitter and turner for the South Melbourne engineering firm Hillyards, and later with the Victorian Board of Works. He was a long-serving president and secretary of the local branch of the Amalgamated Engineering Union and secretary of the Port Melbourne branch of the Labor Party.

Corrigan was elected to the Legislative Assembly in 1942 when he won a by-election following the death of James Murphy. He would himself die in office in 1952, ten days after announcing his impending retirement due to ill health. He was buried at the Melbourne General Cemetery. His son, Stan Corrigan, won the resulting by-election to replace him in parliament.

Victorian Legislative Assembly
Preceded by James Murphy	Member for Port Melbourne; 1942–1952	Succeeded by Stan Corrigan
