= Electoral district of Elsternwick =

State electoral district in Melbourne, Victoria, Australia

Elsternwick Victoria—Legislative Assembly
- State: Victoria
- Created: 1945
- Abolished: 1967
- Namesake: Elsternwick, Victoria
- Demographic: Metropolitan
- Coordinates: 37°53′S 145°0′E

The Electoral district of Elsternwick was an electoral district of the Victorian Legislative Assembly situated in the Melbourne south-east suburb of Elsternwick, Victoria. It was created in 1945 and abolished in 1967.

== Members for Elsternwick ==
Member	Party	Term
John Don	Liberal Party	1945–1955
John Don	Electoral Reform League	1945–1955
Richard Gainey	Liberal Party	1955–1967

== See also ==
- Parliaments of the Australian states and territories
- List of members of the Victorian Legislative Assembly
