= Vernon Wilcox =

Australian politician (1919–2004)

The Honourable Vernon Wilcox CBE QC

Attorney-General of Victoria
- In office 30 May 1973 – 31 March 1976
- Monarch: Elizabeth II
- Premier: Rupert Hamer
- Preceded by: George Reid
- Succeeded by: Alan Hunt

Minister of Transport
- In office 1967 – 30 May 1973
- Premier: Henry Bolte; Rupert Hamer
- Preceded by: Dean Brown
- Succeeded by: Vickie Chapman

Minister for Labour and Industry
- In office 1965–1967
- Premier: Henry Bolte

Assistant Attorney-General
- In office 27 June 1964 – 1967
- Premier: Henry Bolte

Minister for Immigration
- In office 27 June 1964 – 1 December 1965
- Premier: Henry Bolte
- Preceded by: Rupert Hamer
- Succeeded by: George Reid

Assistant Chief Secretary
- In office 27 June 1964 – 1965
- Premier: Henry Bolte

Member of the Victorian Parliament for Camberwell
- In office 18 March 1956 – 31 March 1976
- Preceded by: Robert Whately
- Succeeded by: Seat abolished

Personal details
- Born: Vernon Francis Wilcox; 10 March 1919 Camberwell, Victoria, Australia
- Died: 13 March 2004 (aged 85) Melbourne, Victoria, Australia
- Party: Electoral Reform Party; Liberal Party of Australia (VIC)
- Spouse: Jean Wilcox (m. 1942)
- Education: Carey Baptist Grammar School
- Alma mater: University of Melbourne
- Profession: Politician; Lawyer

Military service
- Allegiance: Australia
- Branch/service: Royal Australian Naval Volunteer Reserve
- Years of service: 1942–1945
- Rank: Lieutenant
- Battles/wars: World War II; Pacific Campaign

Vernon Francis Wilcox CBE QC (10 April 1919 – 13 March 2004) was an Australian politician. In a political career spanning twenty years, he represented the electorate of Camberwell in the Victorian Legislative Assembly and held many positions in the Victorian Cabinet. He is best known today as the initiator of the Melbourne Underground Rail Loop, but also delivered a memorable speech to parliament in 1971 in favour of building a railway line to complement the Eastern Freeway.

Wilcox was born in Camberwell, a suburb of Melbourne. He was educated at Carey Baptist Grammar School, where he won the "Henry Meeks Medal for Leadership, Scholarship and Athletics" in 1932 and 1935 and acted as School Captain from 1935 to 1936. Wilcox maintained an interest in the school long after he graduated, and from 1963 to 1970 he served on the School Council and President of the Old Carey Grammarians Association (OCGA) in 1950. After secondary school, Wilcox went on to study law at the University of Melbourne where he was resident at Ormond College. He matriculated shortly before the outbreak of World War II, and joined the Royal Australian Naval Volunteer Reserve, serving as a Lieutenant from 1942 to 1945. During his time in the Navy, he worked as liaison officer to the United States of America's Seventh Fleet. After the war, Wilcox put his degree into practice, joining his father's firm, Hall and Wilcox, in 1946.

In the 1940s, Wilcox became active in the Liberal Party but, in 1952, he contested the seat of Camberwell unsuccessfully, as a member of the break-away Electoral Reform Party. Back in the Liberal Party fold, he successfully contested Camberwell at a 1956 by-election. In 1964, he became a Cabinet Minister, being appointed Assistant Chief Secretary, Assistant Attorney-General, and Minister for Immigration. In 1965, he remained Assistant Attorney-General, but replaced the other two portfolios with the role of Minister for Labour and Industry. In 1967, he was made Minister of Transport, and in 1973, he became Attorney General. Wilcox retired from Parliament in 1976. Looking back over his career, he cited turning the first sod on the project to build the Melbourne Underground Rail Loop in June 1971 as his proudest memory. In 2001, Wilcox wrote Minister for the Crown, in which he reflected on his life in pre-war Melbourne, and his career in politics as a member of the Bolte and Hamer Ministries. The book's foreword was penned by Geoffrey Blainey.

In 1998, Wilcox was selected as a delegate to the fourth Constitutional Convention, running on a "Safeguard the People" ticket. His mission at the Convention was to ensure that any modifications made to the Australian Constitution towards a Republic maintained the present checks and balances against Centralism and the power of the Executive and the Judiciary. He argued, "We have had a Constitution, rightly or wrongly, that has been significantly destabilised, a generation of young people ... who believe we have a bad Constitution, paradoxically, when it is in fact the best in the world."

Wilcox was a keen sportsman. He played cricket as a wicket-keeper at university and later for Richmond Cricket Club, and in later life would be a trustee of the Melbourne Cricket Ground and maintained a long association with the Camberwell Magpies Cricket Club. He was also involved for decades with the Returned and Services League of Australia and the Royal Agricultural Society of Victoria. He was made Commander of the Order of the British Empire (CBE) in 1976. Wilcox married his wife Jean in 1942, and the couple had four children and thirteen grandchildren. He died in 2004, at the age of 84.
