= Arthur Rylah =

Australian politician (1909–1974)

The Honourable Sir Arthur Rylah KBE, CMG
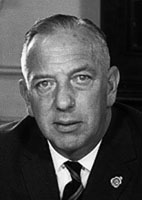

17th Deputy Premier of Victoria
- In office 7 June 1955 – 5 March 1971
- Premier: Henry Bolte
- Preceded by: Bill Galvin
- Succeeded by: Dick Hamer

Member of the Victorian Legislative Assembly for Kew
- In office 17 December 1949 – 5 March 1971
- Preceded by: Wilfrid Kent Hughes
- Succeeded by: Dick Hamer

Personal details
- Born: Arthur Gordon Rylah; 3 October 1909 Kew, Melbourne, Victoria, Australia
- Died: 20 September 1974 (aged 64) Fitzroy, Melbourne, Victoria, Australia
- Party: Liberal and Country Party, Liberal Party
- Spouse(s): Ann Flora Froude Flashman; Ruth Reiner

Sir Arthur Gordon Rylah, KBE CMG (3 October 1909 – 20 September 1974) was an Australian politician and lawyer who served as Deputy Premier of Victoria from 1955 to 1971.

== Background ==
Rylah was born in Kew, Melbourne, the son of Walter Robert Rylah, a solicitor, and Helen Isabel Webb. He was educated at Trinity Grammar and the University of Melbourne, where he entered residence at Trinity College in 1928 reading Arts. He graduated with a law degree in 1932. On 10 September 1937 Rylah married Ann Flora Froude Flashman, a veterinarian, with whom he had two children.

In 1940 he was appointed major in the Australian Imperial Force, serving in the Northern Territory, New Guinea and New Britain. He was mentioned in despatches.

== Politics ==
After being demobilised in January 1946, he returned to practising law, and joined the newly formed Liberal Party. On 17 December 1949 he was elected to the Victorian Legislative Assembly for Kew, a safe conservative seat in Melbourne's eastern suburbs. The sitting member, Wilfrid Kent Hughes, had moved up to federal politics. Rylah would hold this seat without serious difficulty until he resigned in March 1971.

Rylah's political colleagues quickly recognised his talents, and in 1953 he was appointed deputy leader of the party under party leader Henry Bolte, a post he would hold for 18 years.

The Liberals won government at the Victorian election of 1955. Accordingly, on 7 June 1955, Rylah was appointed Deputy Premier and Chief Secretary of Victoria, as well as Government Leader in the Legislative Assembly.

Described as a "human dynamo", Rylah had great capacity for work. During his time as Chief Secretary he oversaw the consolidation of all Victoria's statutes (1958), introduced legal off-course betting (1960) using the New Zealand Totalisator Agency Board (TAB) as a model, allowed cinemas to open on Sundays (1964), did away with six o'clock closing of hotels, thereby permitting alcohol to be served till 10pm (1965), allowed sport to be played on Sundays (1967), and sponsored legislation for the compulsory wearing of seat-belts for motorists (1970) and to provide for random breath-testing of drivers (1971). As attorney general he also approved Australia's last execution with the execution of Ronald Ryan in 1967.

In something of a contrast to this dynamism, Rylah's attitudes regarding morality and censorship were seen by many to be reactionary and repressive. His remark in 1964 that he would not allow his 'teenage daughter' to read Mary McCarthy's novel The Group became notorious. When it was pointed out to him that he did not have a teenage daughter (his sole daughter was fully adult), he replied that he could always imagine one. He zealously took on the role of public censor, banning everything from James Joyce's Ulysses to Rudyard Kipling's Barrack-Room Ballads ("No, I haven't read it, but with a title like that it must be dirty"). He was also responsible for prohibiting performances of the play The Boys in the Band (which he condemned as obscene) and for the covering of public statues of Michelangelo's David.

He separated from his wife Ann in 1968, and on 15 March 1969 she was found dead in her garden. An autopsy determined that she had died of a subarachnoid haemorrhage and the state coroner, in an unusual move which generated considerable controversy at the time, allowed her remains to be cremated without an inquest into her sudden death. Within seven months Rylah married Norma Alison ('Ruth') Reiner, née French, a divorcee 17 years his junior. Reiner had four children to three fathers: Ace Phillips, David and Sam Reiner, and Michael Clark. Clark's existence was a family secret until after Reiner's death, when he was contacted by David Reiner.

In February 1971 Rylah announced that he would resign from parliament in the following month. However he collapsed at his desk on 5 March and spent the next four months in hospital. He was succeeded as member for Kew and deputy premier by future premier Dick Hamer. He retired to his rural property, pursued his interest in horse-racing, and became a director of several companies. He died on 20 September 1974 in hospital in the Melbourne suburb of Fitzroy, survived by his second wife, and by the children of his first marriage. Rylah had a state funeral.

== Honours ==
Arthur Rylah was appointed a Companion of the Order of St Michael and St George (CMG) in the 1965 New Year Honours list. He was knighted as a Knight Commander of the Order of the British Empire (KBE) in the Queen's Birthday Honours of 1968. He is commemorated in the name of the Arthur Rylah Institute for Environmental Research.

Sir Arthur Rylah Oval in Kew, Victoria was named in his honour, and plays hosts to sporting matches from local school, Xavier College (Burke Hall Campus).
