= Electoral district of Camberwell =

Former state electoral district of Victoria, Australia

Camberwell Victoria—Legislative Assembly
- State: Victoria
- Created: 1945
- Abolished: 1976
- Demographic: Metropolitan
- Coordinates: 37°50′S 145°4′E

Camberwell was an electoral district of the Legislative Assembly in the Australian state of Victoria from 1945 to 1976. It centred on the eastern Melbourne suburb of Camberwell.

== Members for Camberwell ==
Member	Party	Term
Robert Whately	Liberal	1945 – 1956
Vernon Wilcox	Liberal	1956 – 1976
