= Electoral district of Port Melbourne =

Former state electoral district of Victoria, Australia

Coordinates: 37°49′50″S 144°55′30″E

Port Melbourne Victoria—Legislative Assembly
- State: Victoria
- Created: 1889
- Abolished: 1958
- Namesake: Port Melbourne, Victoria
- Demographic: Metropolitan

Port Melbourne was an electoral district of the Victorian Legislative Assembly. It was created in 1889, replacing the previous electorate of Sandridge, which was the former name for Port Melbourne.

Port Melbourne was defined by the Electoral Act Amendment Act 1888 (taking effect at 1889 elections) as:

Commencing on the shore of Hobson's Bay opposite the end of Pickles-street; thence northerly by that street to Boundary-road; north-westerly by that road and a line in continuation thereof to the Yarra River; down the Yarra River through the new channel to the shore of Hobson's Bay, and easterly by that shore to the commencing point.

It was initially won by then-Sandridge MLA Frederick Derham.

It was abolished in 1958 and merged into the electorate of Albert Park. The last MLA for Port Melbourne, Archie Todd went on to contest and win the Victorian Legislative Council seat of Melbourne West Province.

== Members for Port Melbourne ==
Member	Party	Term
Frederick Derham	Unaligned	1889–1892
Philip Salmon	Labor	1892-1893
Philip Salmon	Unaligned	1893-1894
George Sangster	Labor	1894–1902
George Sangster	Independent Labor	1902–1906
George Sangster	Labor	1906–1915
Owen Sinclair	Labor	1915–1917
Owen Sinclair	Independent	1917
James Murphy	Labor	1917–1942
Tom Corrigan	Labor	1942–1952
Stan Corrigan	Labor	1952–1955
Stan Corrigan	Labor (Anti-Communist)	1955
Archie Todd	Labor	1955–1958

== Notes ==
^{1} There are conflicting sources as to whether Phillip Salmon, member from 1892 to 1894, was endorsed by Labor, as this was not always clear in the then-nascent party system of the 1890s.
