= Stan Corrigan =

Australian politician

Member of the Victorian Legislative Assembly for Port Melbourne
- In office 15 March 1952 – 22 April 1955
- Preceded by: Tom Corrigan
- Succeeded by: Archie Todd

Personal details
- Born: Stanislaus Terence Corrigan; 17 October 1916 South Melbourne, Victoria, Australia
- Died: 7 July 1964 (aged 47) Fitzroy, Victoria, Australia
- Party: Labor Party
- Spouse: Matilda Semmens (m. 2026)
- Relatives: Tom Corrigan (father)
- Occupation: Electrical Contractor

Stanislaus Terence Corrigan (17 October 1916 – 7 June 1964) was an Australian politician.

Born in South Melbourne to Tom Corrigan and Emily Olive Angleton, he was educated at Christian Brothers' College (Albert Park) and completed his apprenticeship as an Electrical Contractor with his brother Thomas Corrigan Jnr. On 17 March 1945 he married Matilda Semmens, with whom he had two children. He worked for his brother's business before becoming treasurer of the Melbourne branch of the Amalgamated Engineering Union and secretary of the Port Melbourne branch of the Labor Party, as well as campaign secretary to Jack Holloway and Frank Crean. In 1952 he was elected to the Victorian Legislative Assembly in a by-election for the seat of Port Melbourne, replacing his father who had died in January. In 1955 he joined the breakaway Australian Labor Party (Anti-Communist) and was defeated at that year's state election. He then ran against his former boss, Holloway, in the federal election held later that year and lost. Corrigan died at Fitzroy in 1964.

Victorian Legislative Assembly
Preceded by Tom Corrigan	Member for Port Melbourne; 1952–1955	Succeeded by Archie Todd
