= Robert Whately =

Australian politician

Robert Kirkham Whately (27 August 1895 – 17 March 1956) was an Australian politician.

== Personal life and education ==
Whately was born in Newtown in Sydney to company director Robert Kirkham Whately and Mary Ann Amelia Bagley. He attended Sydney Boys' High School, the University of Melbourne (MA), Sydney University (Dip Ed) and Western Reserve University in Cleveland, Ohio. In November 1921 he married Leura Jean Jarvis, and they had two children.

He became a psychologist, and in 1932 was founding director of the Victorian Vocational and Child Guidance Centre.

== Political career ==
In 1945 he was elected to the Victorian Legislative Assembly as the Liberal member for Camberwell. He was party whip from 1947 to 1948 and parliamentary secretary from 1948 to 1950, during which time he introduced secret ballots for leadership elections.

He was Minister of Forests, State Development and Decentralisation from 1955 to 1956 and in February 1956 was appointed Minister of Immigration, but the following month he was killed in a car accident near Yass.

Victorian Legislative Assembly
New seat	Member for Camberwell; 1945–1956	Succeeded by Vernon Wilcox
