= William Buckingham (Australian politician) =

Australian politician

William John Buckingham (4 December 1890 – 3 June 1964) was an Australian politician.

He was born in Nerrena to farmer Thomas Fuller Buckingham and Catherine Brewer. He became a dairy farmer at Leongatha, and on 16 November 1921 married Ella Laura Hyde, with whom he had three children. He was a member of the Country Party, serving as president of the Leongatha branch and of the Central Gippsland district council. In 1947 he was elected to the Victorian Legislative Assembly for Wonthaggi. He was party whip from 1950 to 1955, when his seat was abolished and he retired. Buckingham died at Leongatha in 1964.

Victorian Legislative Assembly
Preceded by William McKenzie	Member for Wonthaggi; 1947–1955	Abolished
