= Electoral district of Wonthaggi =

Former state electoral district in Victoria, Australia

Coordinates: 38°36′S 145°35′E

Wonthaggi Victoria—Legislative Assembly
- State: Victoria
- Created: 1927
- Abolished: 1955
- Namesake: Town of Wonthaggi
- Demographic: Rural

The Electoral district of Wonthaggi was an electoral district of the Legislative Assembly in the Australian state of Victoria.

== Members ==
Member	Party	Term
William McKenzie	Labor	1927–1947
William Buckingham	Country	1947–1955
