= Electoral district of Glen Iris =

Former state electoral district of Victoria, Australia

Glen Iris Victoria—Legislative Assembly
- State: Victoria
- Dates current: 1945–1955, 1967–1976
- Namesake: Suburb of Glen Iris
- Demographic: Metropolitan
- Coordinates: 37°51′S 145°04′E

The Electoral district of Glen Iris was an electoral district of the Victorian Legislative Assembly.

It was created in the redistribution of 1945 when several districts including Boroondara were abolished. Glen Iris was abolished in the 1955 redistribution when several districts including Burwood and Caulfield East were created. Glen Iris was recreated in 1967, replacing Burwood. It was abolished again in 1976, replaced by a recreated Burwood.

== Members ==
First incarnation 1945–1955
Member	Party	Term
Ian McLaren	Independent	1945–1947
Les Norman	Liberal / LCP	1947–1952
Thomas Hollway	Electoral Reform League	1952–1955

Second incarnation 1967–1976
Member	Party	Term
Jim MacDonald	Liberal	1967–1976

== See also ==
- Parliaments of the Australian states and territories
- List of members of the Victorian Legislative Assembly
