= John Don =

Australian politician

The Honourable John Don MBE

Member of the Victorian Legislative Assembly for Elsternwick
- In office 10 November 1945 – 27 May 1955
- Preceded by: District created
- Succeeded by: Richard Gainey

Personal details
- Born: 10 September 1918 Ballarat, Victoria, Australia
- Died: 1 April 2013 (aged 94)
- Party: Liberal Party; Liberal and Country Party; Victorian Liberal Party
- Spouse: Joan Davies
- Children: Three daughters
- Education: University of Melbourne
- Profession: Solicitor

Military service
- Allegiance: Australia
- Branch/service: Australian Imperial Force
- Years of service: 1940–1946
- Rank: Major
- Unit: 9th Division Cavalry Regiment; British Intelligence Corps
- Awards: MBE (1943)

John Don MBE (10 September 1918 – 1 April 2013) was an Australian politician.

Don was born in Ballarat to solicitor Joseph Edwin Don and Mary Minnie Cross. He attended various state schools before studying at Melbourne University. During World War II he served in the Middle East (serving in the 75th Tank Regiment, 6th American Army) and later the Philippines, attaining the rank of major and being awarded the MBE in 1943. On 9 March 1943, he married Joan Yvonne Davies, with whom he had three daughters.

In 1945, Don was elected to the Victorian Legislative Assembly as the Liberal member for Elsternwick, while he was still studying law (he would be admitted as a solicitor in 1954). He was briefly a minister without portfolio in June 1950. A supporter of Thomas Hollway, he was one of the rebels who voted against the McDonald Country Party government in 1952 and served as Minister of Transport and Minister of Labour in the seventy-hour ministry that resulted. Expelled from the Liberal Party, he was defeated as an Electoral Reform League candidate in 1955. A solicitor after leaving parliament, he later re-joined the Liberal Party. Don died in 2013.

Victorian Legislative Assembly
New seat	Member for Elsternwick; 1945–1955	Succeeded by Richard Gainey
Political offices
Preceded by Herbert Hyland	Minister of Transport; 1952	Succeeded by Herbert Hyland
Preceded by Trevor Harvey	Minister of Labour; 1952	Succeeded by Trevor Harvey
