= Les Norman (politician) =

Australian politician (1913–1997)

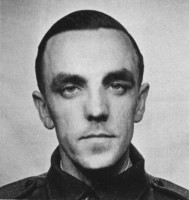

Member of the Victorian Legislative Assembly for Glen Iris
- In office 8 November 1947 – 5 December 1952
- Preceded by: Ian McLaren
- Succeeded by: Thomas Hollway

Personal details
- Born: Leslie George Norman; 3 September 1913 Melbourne, Victoria, Australia
- Died: 5 July 1997 (aged 83)
- Party: Liberal Party; Liberal and Country Party
- Spouse: Rosa Glover
- Occupation: Accountant

Military service
- Allegiance: Australia
- Branch/service: Australian Army
- Years of service: 1941–1945
- Rank: Lieutenant
- Unit: 8th Division

Leslie George Norman (3 September 1913 – 5 July 1997) was an Australian politician. Norman represented Glen Iris in the Victorian Legislative Assembly for four years, and led the Liberal and Country Party from 1951–1952. Norman was a staunch Methodist and an equally staunch conservative. He held strong small government views, and had little patience for the "socialism" of the Labor Party.

Born in Melbourne, Norman attended primary school in Malvern and went on to University High School. Upon graduation at the age of 15, he joined an accounting firm as a clerk. He took night classes in accountancy during his employment there, and at the age of 22, left the firm to set up his own practice, Norman and Cartledge.

At the outbreak of World War II, Norman enlisted in the Second Australian Imperial Force and was posted in Malaya with the Australian 8th Division. He was captured in Singapore in 1942, and forced to sit out the rest of the war in Changi Prison. The prison at the time also housed Wilfrid Kent Hughes, Tom Mitchell, and William Leggatt, and the four would often discuss politics together. Norman entered the war as a Private, and left as a Lieutenant. After the war, Norman resumed his accounting practice.

In 1947, Norman won the electorate of Glen Iris. He became the Government Whip under Thomas Hollway in 1948. The Hollway government was defeated by the Country Party in 1950, and in 1951 Norman took over leadership from Hollway, amidst internal dissent over Hollway's plans to redistribute the seats of Victoria and reduce the power of rural electorates.

Norman's reign was short-lived, however, and he lost his seat in 1952 to a challenge from Hollway. He left politics and returned to his accounting practice. He also became active with various charities, acting as Vice-President of the Australian Red Cross and, as a member of Moral Re-Armament, working towards reconciliation with the Japanese.

Norman died in 1997 at the age of 83, and is survived by his wife Nina, ex-wife Rosa, and children Douglas and Anne.

Victorian Legislative Assembly
Preceded by Ian McLaren	Member for Glen Iris; 1947–1952	Succeeded by Thomas Hollway
Party political offices
Preceded by Thomas Hollway	Leader of the Liberal and Country Party in Victoria; 1951–1952	Succeeded by Trevor Oldham
