= 1952 Victorian state election =

Australian state election

← 1950	6 December 1952	1955 →

All 65 seats in the Victorian Legislative Assembly 33 seats needed for a majority
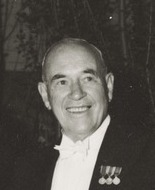

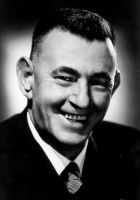

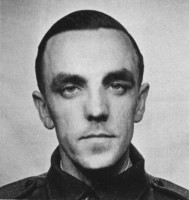

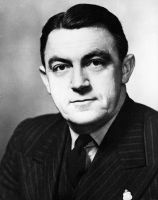
	First party	Second party
Leader	John Cain	John McDonald
Party	Labor	Country
Leader since	18 October 1937	22 November 1945
Leader's seat	Northcote	Shepparton
Last election	24 seats	13 seats
Seats won	37 seats	12 seats
Seat change	▲13	▼1
Popular vote	504,773	85,843
Percentage	49.07%	8.34%
Swing	▲3.78	▼2.30
TPP	56.72%
	Third party	Fourth party
Leader	Les Norman	Thomas Hollway
Party	Liberal and Country	Electoral Reform League
Leader since	4 December 1951	31 October 1952
Leader's seat	Glen Iris (lost seat)	Glen Iris (won seat)
Last election	27 seats	New party
Seats won	11 seats	4 seats
Seat change	▼16	▲4
Popular vote	255,685	98,641
Percentage	24.85%	9.59%
Swing	▼15.84	▲9.59
TPP	43.28%
- Results in each electorate
Premier before election
John McDonald
Country
Elected Premier
John Cain
Labor

The 1952 Victorian state election was held in the Australian state of Victoria on Saturday 6 December 1952 to elect 65 members of the state's Legislative Assembly.

== Results ==
=== Legislative Assembly ===
Victorian state election, 6 December 1952 Legislative Assembly << 1950–1955 >>
Enrolled voters	1,119,486				
Votes cast	1,047,671		Turnout	93.58	−0.82
Informal votes	18,991		Informal	1.81	+0.67
Summary of votes by party
Party	Primary votes	%	Swing	Seats	Change
Labor	504,773	49.07	+3.78	37	+13
Liberal and Country	255,685	24.85	−15.84	11	−16
Electoral Reform League	98,641	9.59	+9.59	4	+4
Country	85,843	8.34	−2.30	12	−1
Independent	71,068	6.90	+4.04	1	±0
Total	1,028,680			65	
Two-party-preferred
Labor	734,668	56.7	+6.3		
Liberal and Country	560,521	43.3	–6.3		

== See also ==
- Candidates of the 1952 Victorian state election
- Members of the Victorian Legislative Assembly, 1952–1955
- Members of the Victorian Legislative Council, 1952–1955
- 1952 Victorian Legislative Council election
