= Victorian Liberal Party (1954) =

Former political party in Australia

The Victorian Liberal Party (VLP), often called the Hollway Liberals, was an independent political party formed on 27 October 1954 from a grouping of supporters of Thomas Hollway, a former leader of the Liberal and Country Party and Premier of Victoria. The extant Liberal and Country Party was the actual Victorian division of the Liberal Party.

The party was formed from the Electoral Reform League, a political group formed by Hollway after his expulsion from the Liberal and Country Party, with the goal of re-distributing Victoria's electoral boundaries, which Hollway and his supporters saw as mal-apportioned in favour of the Country Party. Boundaries would be based on dividing each federal electorate into two state districts (a '2 for 1' scheme). With electoral reform implemented by John Cain's Labor government, the group became known as the "Hollway group". On 27 October 1954, the Speaker informed the assembly that Hollway's group had formally become an Opposition party. Hollway told reporters that he had attempted to unify opposition against the Labor Party, but that the Liberal and Country Party had rejected his overtures, leaving him no option but to form a "separate political entity". He stated that the VLP had been formed to bring "the true principles of liberalism to the Parliament".

In December 1954 Hollway issued an ultimatum to the Cain government, demanding it remove price controls or his party would use its two votes in the Victorian Legislative Council to defeat the Price Control Extension Bill, which would have extended government control of prices a further twelve months from its expiration date of 31 December. The government ignored the ultimatum, and the bill was defeated in the upper house, but Cain came to an agreement with Hollway to maintain supply.

The party ceased to exist in 1955 when all four members of the party (Hollway, Alexander Dennett, John Don and Ray Tovell) lost their seats in the Legislative Assembly at the 1955 state election.
