= Electoral results for the district of Mildura =

This is a list of electoral results for the Electoral district of Mildura in Victorian state elections.

== Members for Mildura ==
Member	Party	Term
Albert Allnutt	Country Progressive	1927–1930
Albert Allnutt	Country	1930–1945
Albert Allnutt	Independent	1945
Louis Garlick	Labor	1945–1947
Nathaniel Barclay	Country	1947–1952
Alan Lind	Labor	1952–1955
Nathaniel Barclay	Country	1955–1962
Milton Whiting	Country	1962–1975
Milton Whiting	National Country	1975–1982
Milton Whiting	National	1982–1988
Craig Bildstien	Liberal	1988–1996
Russell Savage	Independent	1996–2006
Peter Crisp	National	2006–2018
Ali Cupper	Independent	2018–2022
Jade Benham	National	2022–present

== Election results ==
=== Elections in the 2020s ===
2022 Victorian state election: Mildura
Party	Candidate	Votes	%	±%
Independent	Ali Cupper	12,913	33.9	+2.9
National	Jade Benham	9,868	25.9	−11.4
Liberal	Paul Matheson	7,291	19.1	+16.1
Labor	Stella Zigouras	2,483	6.5	−11.1
Independent	Glenn Milne	1,716	4.5	+4.5
Independent	Sonia Brymer	1,080	2.8	+2.8
Greens	Katie Clements	894	2.3	−1.4
Democratic Labour	Felicity Sharpe	586	1.5	+1.4
Family First	Brad Stratton	560	1.5	+1.5
Freedom	Philippe John Brougham	416	1.1	+1.1
Animal Justice	Angylina Zayn	333	0.9	+0.8
Total formal votes		38,140	92.5	−2.3
Informal votes		3,096	7.5	+2.3
Turnout		41,236	86.0	−1.9
Notional two-party-preferred count
National	Jade Benham	24,454	64.1	+7.9
Labor	Stella Zigouras	13,686	35.9	−7.9
Two-candidate-preferred result
National	Jade Benham	19,520	51.2	+0.9
Independent	Ali Cupper	18,620	48.8	−0.9
National gain from Independent		Swing	+0.9	

=== Elections in the 2010s ===
2018 Victorian state election: Mildura
Party	Candidate	Votes	%	±%
National	Peter Crisp	14,654	39.39	−6.71
Independent	Ali Cupper	12,180	32.74	+11.45
Labor	Tony Alessi	6,404	17.21	+5.56
Independent	Steven Timmis	2,555	6.87	+6.87
Greens	Cathryn Milne	1,414	3.80	+1.96
Total formal votes		37,207	94.91	+1.96
Informal votes		1,996	5.09	−1.96
Turnout		39,203	88.29	−4.04
Notional two-party-preferred count
National	Peter Crisp	20,692	55.61	−14.61
Labor	Tony Alessi	16,515	44.39	+14.61
Two-candidate-preferred result
Independent	Ali Cupper	18,730	50.34	+8.38
National	Peter Crisp	18,477	49.66	−8.38
Independent gain from National		Swing	+8.38	

2014 Victorian state election: Mildura
Party	Candidate	Votes	%	±%
National	Peter Crisp	16,794	46.1	−3.5
Independent	Ali Cupper	7,755	21.3	+21.3
Labor	Shane Roberts	4,244	11.6	−3.5
Country Alliance	Danny Lee	3,485	9.6	+9.6
Independent	Jo Clutterbuck	1,556	4.3	+4.3
Rise Up Australia	Carl Carter	1,012	2.8	+2.8
Greens	Morgana Russell	671	1.8	−0.0
Family First	Judith Fenn	633	1.7	−1.3
Independent	Mark Cory	286	0.8	+0.8
Total formal votes		36,436	92.9	−1.3
Informal votes		2,763	7.0	+1.3
Turnout		39,199	92.3	+1.4
Notional two-party-preferred count
National	Peter Crisp	25,585	70.2	+5.7
Labor	Shane Roberts	10,851	29.8	−5.7
Two-candidate-preferred result
National	Peter Crisp	21,271	58.0	−6.5
Independent	Ali Cupper	15,379	42.0	+42.0
National hold		Swing	N/A	

2010 Victorian state election: Mildura
Party	Candidate	Votes	%	±%
National	Peter Crisp	15,170	46.66	+6.43
Independent	Glenn Milne	5,209	16.02	+16.02
Labor	Ali Cupper	4,943	15.20	+8.54
Independent	Doug Tonge	4,696	14.44	+14.44
Family First	Christopher Gray	999	3.07	−0.51
Greens	Gavin Rees	563	1.73	−0.40
Democratic Labor	Ross Douglass	475	1.46	+1.46
Independent	Anthony Connell	457	1.41	+1.41
Total formal votes		32,512	94.17	−0.95
Informal votes		2,011	5.83	+0.95
Turnout		34,523	91.72	−0.44
Notional two-party-preferred count
National	Peter Crisp	20,417	62.8	−7.9
Labor	Ali Cupper	12,095	37.2	+7.9
Two-candidate-preferred result
National	Peter Crisp	19,310	59.19	+3.39
Independent	Glenn Milne	13,312	40.81	+40.81
National hold		Swing	+3.39	

=== Elections in the 2000s ===
2006 Victorian state election: Mildura
Party	Candidate	Votes	%	±%
National	Peter Crisp	12,808	40.2	+15.0
Independent	Russell Savage	10,822	34.0	−17.7
Liberal	Gavin Sedgmen	3,686	11.6	+1.3
Labor	Alison Smith	2,120	6.7	−2.8
Family First	Tim Middleton	1,140	3.6	+3.6
Greens	Bruce Rivendell	678	2.1	+0.4
Independent	Chris Katis	585	1.8	+1.8
Total formal votes		31,839	95.1	−1.8
Informal votes		1,632	4.9	+1.8
Turnout		33,471	92.2	
Notional two-party-preferred count
National	Peter Crisp	22,507	70.7	+14.0
Labor	Alison Smith	9,330	29.3	−14.0
Two-candidate-preferred result
National	Peter Crisp	17,854	56.1	+24.5
Independent	Russell Savage	13,985	43.9	−24.5
National gain from Independent		Swing	+24.5	

2002 Victorian state election: Mildura
Party	Candidate	Votes	%	±%
Independent	Russell Savage	16,712	51.7	+8.8
National	Tom Crouch	8,136	25.2	+3.8
Liberal	Stan Sleep	3,316	10.3	−14.4
Labor	John Zigouras	3,075	9.5	+0.4
Greens	Bruce Rivendell	563	1.7	+1.7
Independent	Tony Cursaro	535	1.7	+1.7
Total formal votes		32,337	96.9	−0.4
Informal votes		1,043	3.1	+0.4
Turnout		33,380	92.5	
Notional two-party-preferred count
National	Tom Crouch	18,284	56.7	−6.6
Labor	John Zigouras	13,957	43.3	+6.6
Two-candidate-preferred result
Independent	Russell Savage	22,121	68.4	+12.5
National	Tom Crouch	10,197	31.6	+31.6
Independent hold		Swing	+12.5	

=== Elections in the 1990s ===
1999 Victorian state election: Mildura
Party	Candidate	Votes	%	±%
Independent	Russell Savage	13,551	44.4	+8.7
Liberal	Peter Danson	7,998	26.2	−19.0
National	Anne Mansell	6,015	19.7	+19.7
Labor	John Zigouras	2,572	8.4	−9.5
Democrats	Tom Joyce	391	1.3	+1.3
Total formal votes		30,527	97.6	−0.7
Informal votes		763	2.4	+0.7
Turnout		31,290	94.3	
Notional two-party-preferred count
Liberal	Peter Danson	19,304	63.2	−1.4
Labor	John Zigouras	11,223	36.8	+1.4
Two-candidate-preferred result
Independent	Russell Savage	17,290	56.6	+5.2
Liberal	Peter Danson	13,237	43.4	−5.2
Independent hold		Swing	+5.2	

1996 Victorian state election: Mildura
Party	Candidate	Votes	%	±%
Liberal	Craig Bildstien	13,443	45.2	−20.8
Independent	Russell Savage	10,616	35.7	+35.7
Labor	Robyn Paull	5,338	17.9	−6.6
Natural Law	Andrew Lawson Kerr	364	1.2	+1.2
Total formal votes		29,761	98.3	+0.7
Informal votes		521	1.7	−0.7
Turnout		30,282	94.1	
Notional two-party-preferred count
Liberal	Craig Bildstien	19,211	64.7	−6.2
Labor	Robyn Paull	10,495	35.3	+6.2
Two-candidate-preferred result
Independent	Russell Savage	15,273	51.4	+51.4
Liberal	Craig Bildstien	14,447	48.6	−22.3
Independent gain from Liberal		Swing	+51.4	

1992 Victorian state election: Mildura
Party	Candidate	Votes	%	±%
Liberal	Craig Bildstien	19,141	65.9	+33.6
Labor	John Zigouras	7,130	24.6	+2.9
Independent	Tom Campbell	2,763	9.5	+9.5
Total formal votes		29,034	97.5	+0.0
Informal votes		735	2.5	−0.0
Turnout		29,769	96.2	
Two-party-preferred result
Liberal	Craig Bildstien	20,579	70.9	+1.1
Labor	John Zigouras	8,455	29.1	−1.1
Liberal hold		Swing	+1.1	

=== Elections in the 1980s ===
1988 Victorian state election: Mildura
Party	Candidate	Votes	%	±%
National	John Arnold	10,594	38.26	−20.43
Liberal	Craig Bildstien	8,849	31.96	+13.54
Labor	Lindsay Leake	5,962	21.53	−1.36
Independent	David Caccianiga	2,287	8.26	+8.26
Total formal votes		27,692	97.52	−0.37
Informal votes		703	2.48	+0.37
Turnout		28,395	92.52	−0.08
Two-candidate-preferred result
Liberal	Craig Bildstien	14,096	50.96	+50.96
National	John Arnold	13,565	49.04	−26.55
Liberal gain from National		Swing	N/A	

1985 Victorian state election: Mildura
Party	Candidate	Votes	%	±%
National	Milton Whiting	15,283	58.7	+4.7
Labor	Lindsay Leake	5,959	22.9	−6.9
Liberal	Diana Duck	4,796	18.4	+7.2
Total formal votes		26,038	97.9	
Informal votes		560	2.1	
Turnout		26,598	92.3	
Two-party-preferred result
National	Milton Whiting	19,008	73.0	+5.7
Labor	Lindsay Leake	7,050	27.0	−5.7
National hold		Swing	+5.7	

1982 Victorian state election: Mildura
Party	Candidate	Votes	%	±%
National	Milton Whiting	13,097	54.0	−2.1
Labor	Lindsay Leake	7,233	29.8	+4.3
Liberal	Ron Wilson	2,714	11.2	−7.2
Democrats	Donald Wilson	1,225	5.1	+5.1
Total formal votes		24,269	97.4	+0.9
Informal votes		635	2.6	−0.9
Turnout		24,904	93.0	−1.1
Two-party-preferred result
National	Milton Whiting	16,197	66.7	−5.6
Labor	Lindsay Leake	8,072	33.3	+5.6
National hold		Swing	−5.6	

=== Elections in the 1970s ===
1979 Victorian state election: Mildura
Party	Candidate	Votes	%	±%
National	Milton Whiting	13,033	56.1	+4.3
Labor	Harry Sugars	5,912	25.5	+2.1
Liberal	David Mattiske	4,269	18.4	−3.1
Total formal votes		23,214	96.5	−1.4
Informal votes		843	3.5	+1.4
Turnout		24,057	94.1	+1.2
Two-party-preferred result
National	Milton Whiting	16,794	72.3	−1.9
Labor	Harry Sugars	6,420	27.7	+1.9
National hold		Swing	−1.9	

1976 Victorian state election: Mildura
Party	Candidate	Votes	%	±%
National	Milton Whiting	11,521	51.8	−7.2
Labor	Noel Treharne	5,197	23.4	−1.2
Liberal	Lloyd Beasy	4,773	21.5	+10.7
Democratic Labor	Stanley Croughan	752	3.4	−1.9
Total formal votes		22,243	97.9	
Informal votes		472	2.1	
Turnout		22,715	92.9	
Two-party-preferred result
National	Milton Whiting	16,494	74.2	+0.3
Labor	Noel Treharne	5,749	25.8	−0.3
National hold		Swing	+0.3	

1973 Victorian state election: Mildura
Party	Candidate	Votes	%	±%
Country	Milton Whiting	8,536	46.7	+5.9
Labor	Lance Fraser	6,209	34.0	−5.7
Liberal	Kevin Coogan	2,179	11.9	+2.6
Democratic Labor	John Conroy	1,355	7.4	−2.8
Total formal votes		18,279	96.8	+0.3
Informal votes		601	3.2	−0.3
Turnout		18,880	94.3	−0.9
Two-party-preferred result
Country	Milton Whiting	11,753	64.3	+8.7
Labor	Lance Fraser	6,526	35.7	−8.7
Country hold		Swing	+8.7	

1970 Victorian state election: Mildura
Party	Candidate	Votes	%	±%
Country	Milton Whiting	7,014	40.8	−9.7
Labor	Lance Fraser	6,814	39.7	+9.5
Democratic Labor	John Conroy	1,759	10.2	−0.2
Liberal	Kevin Coogan	1,600	9.3	+0.4
Total formal votes		17,187	96.5	−0.6
Informal votes		614	3.5	+0.6
Turnout		17,801	95.2	−0.4
Two-party-preferred result
Country	Milton Whiting	9,551	55.6	−11.8
Labor	Lance Fraser	7,636	44.4	+11.8
Country hold		Swing	−11.8	

=== Elections in the 1960s ===
==== 1967 ====
1967 Victorian state election: Mildura
Party	Candidate	Votes	%	±%
Country	Milton Whiting	8,514	50.5	+2.3
Labor	Lance Fraser	5,093	30.2	−2.0
Democratic Labor	John Conroy	1,749	10.4	+1.2
Liberal	Bruce Wright	1,506	8.9	−1.5
Total formal votes		16,862	97.1	
Informal votes		506	2.9	
Turnout		17,368	95.6	
Two-party-preferred result
Country	Milton Whiting	11,356	67.4	+2.0
Labor	Lance Fraser	5,506	32.6	−2.0
Country hold		Swing	+2.0	

==== 1964 ====
1964 Victorian state election: Mildura
Party	Candidate	Votes	%	±%
Country	Milton Whiting	9,827	50.4	−8.1
Labor	Lance Fraser	5,888	30.2	+6.9
Liberal and Country	Bruce Wright	1,911	9.8	+1.0
Democratic Labor	Donald Delaney	1,874	9.6	+0.2
Total formal votes		19,500	97.6	+0.2
Informal votes		485	2.4	−0.2
Turnout		19,985	95.3	−0.1
Two-party-preferred result
Country	Milton Whiting	13,141	67.4	−7.1
Labor	Lance Fraser	6,359	32.6	+7.1
Country hold		Swing	−7.1	

==== 1962 by-election ====
1962 Mildura state by-election
Party	Candidate	Votes	%	±%
Country	Milton Whiting	8,723	45.5	−14.0
Labor	Arthur Lawton	6,030	31.4	+8.1
Liberal and Country	Geoffrey Harding	2,488	13.0	+4.2
Democratic Labor	William McInerney	1,489	7.8	−1.6
Independent	George Eggleton	460	2.4	+2.4
Total formal votes		19,190	98.2	+0.8
Informal votes		348	1.8	−0.8
Turnout		19,538	93.6	−1.8
Two-party-preferred result
Country	Milton Whiting	12,174	63.4	−11.1
Labor	Arthur Lawton	7,016	36.6	+11.1
Country hold		Swing	−11.1	

==== 1961 ====
1961 Victorian state election: Mildura
Party	Candidate	Votes	%	±%
Country	Nathaniel Barclay	11,215	59.5	−1.1
Labor	Douglas Burgess	4,462	23.3	−4.7
Democratic Labor	William McInerney	1,809	9.4	−2.1
Liberal and Country	Raymond Dixon	1,696	8.8	+8.8
Total formal votes		19,182	97.4	−1.3
Informal votes		505	2.6	+1.3
Turnout		19,687	95.4	+0.4
Two-party-preferred result
Country	Nathaniel Barclay	14,279	74.5	+4.2
Labor	Douglas Burgess	4,903	25.5	−4.2
Country hold		Swing	+4.2	

=== Elections in the 1950s ===
1958 Victorian state election: Mildura
Party	Candidate	Votes	%	±%
Country	Nathaniel Barclay	11,499	60.6	
Labor	William Nicholas	5,311	28.0	
Democratic Labor	John Cotter	2,174	11.4	
Total formal votes		18,984	98.7	
Informal votes		250	1.3	
Turnout		19,234	95.0	
Two-party-preferred result
Country	Nathaniel Barclay	13,348	70.3	
Labor	William Nicholas	5,636	29.7	
Country hold		Swing		

1955 Victorian state election: Mildura
Party	Candidate	Votes	%	±%
Country	Nathaniel Barclay	9,356	52.2	
Labor	Alan Lind	8,579	47.8	
Total formal votes		17,935	99.1	
Informal votes		159	0.9	
Turnout		18,094	94.8	
Country gain from Labor		Swing		

1952 Victorian state election: Mildura
Party	Candidate	Votes	%	±%
Labor	Alan Lind	6,860	51.1	+3.9
Country	Nathaniel Barclay	6,573	48.9	+12.1
Total formal votes		13,433	99.0	+0.1
Informal votes		133	1.0	−0.1
Turnout		13,566	95.4	+0.8
Labor gain from Country		Swing	+1.6	

1950 Victorian state election: Mildura
Party	Candidate	Votes	%	±%
Labor	Louis Garlick	6,266	47.2	−0.8
Country	Nathaniel Barclay	4,889	36.8	−15.2
Liberal and Country	Kathleen Richardson	2,127	16.0	+16.0
Total formal votes		13,282	98.9	−0.3
Informal votes		147	1.1	+0.3
Turnout		13,429	94.6	+1.0
Two-party-preferred result
Country	Nathaniel Barclay	6,703	50.5	−1.5
Labor	Louis Garlick	6,579	49.5	+1.5
Country hold		Swing	−1.5	

=== Elections in the 1940s ===
1947 Victorian state election: Mildura
Party	Candidate	Votes	%	±%
Country	Nathaniel Barclay	6,947	52.0	+23.4
Labor	Louis Garlick	6,421	48.0	+4.3
Total formal votes		13,368	99.2	+1.6
Informal votes		103	0.8	−1.6
Turnout		13,471	93.6	+7.6
Country gain from Labor		Swing	+3.2	

1945 Victorian state election: Mildura
Party	Candidate	Votes	%	±%
Labor	Louis Garlick	4,797	43.7	
Country	Nathaniel Barclay	3,144	28.6	
Independent Country	Albert Allnutt	2,582	23.5	
Country	John Edey	461	4.2	
Total formal votes		10,984	97.6	
Informal votes		269	2.4	
Turnout		11,253	86.0	
Two-party-preferred result
Labor	Louis Garlick	5,620	51.2	
Country	Nathaniel Barclay	5,364	48.8	
Labor gain from Independent		Swing		

1943 Victorian state election: Mildura
Party	Candidate	Votes	%	±%
Labor	John Egan	4,428	41.5	+41.5
Country	Albert Allnutt	3,655	34.2	−4.2
Country	Campbell Cameron	2,590	24.3	+24.3
Total formal votes		10,673	97.9	+0.7
Informal votes		230	2.1	−0.7
Turnout		10,903	82.7	−10.3
Two-party-preferred result
Country	Albert Allnutt	5,490	51.4	−2.0
Labor	John Egan	5,183	48.6	+48.6
Country hold		Swing	N/A	

1940 Victorian state election: Mildura
Party	Candidate	Votes	%	±%
Country	Albert Allnutt	4,525	38.4	−20.9
Country	Alfred Rawlings	3,878	32.9	+32.9
Independent Labor	John Egan	3,376	28.7	+28.7
Total formal votes		11,779	97.2	−1.7
Informal votes		342	2.8	+1.7
Turnout		12,121	93.0	+0.2
Two-candidate-preferred result
Country	Albert Allnutt	6,296	53.4	−5.9
Country	Alfred Rawlings	5,483	46.6	+46.6
Country hold		Swing	N/A	

=== Elections in the 1930s ===
1937 Victorian state election: Mildura
Party	Candidate	Votes	%	±%
Country	Albert Allnutt	7,152	59.3	+4.8
Labor	John Egan	4,913	40.7	+40.7
Total formal votes		12,065	98.9	+3.8
Informal votes		133	1.1	−3.8
Turnout		12,198	92.8	+3.0
Country hold		Swing	N/A	

1935 Victorian state election: Mildura
Party	Candidate	Votes	%	±%
Country	Albert Allnutt	6,027	54.5	−3.1
Independent	William Ellison	1,682	15.2	+15.2
Country	James Lochhead	1,274	11.5	+11.5
Country	James Power	1,070	9.7	+9.7
Country	George Hardie	1,006	9.1	+9.1
Total formal votes		11,059	95.1	−3.2
Informal votes		566	4.9	+3.2
Turnout		11,625	89.8	+2.6
Country hold		Swing	N/A	

- Preferences were not distributed.

1932 Victorian state election: Mildura
Party	Candidate	Votes	%	±%
Country	Albert Allnutt	5,739	57.6	+34.7
Labor	Robert Robertson	2,530	25.4	−12.6
Independent	William Hayes	1,695	17.0	+17.0
Total formal votes		10,764	98.3	−0.1
Informal votes		172	1.7	+0.1
Turnout		10,936	92.4	+2.4
Two-party-preferred result
Country	Albert Allnutt		66.1	+6.1
Labor	Robert Robertson		33.9	−6.1
Country hold		Swing	+6.1	

- Two party preferred vote was estimated.

=== Elections in the 1920s ===
1929 Victorian state election: Mildura
Party	Candidate	Votes	%	±%
Country Progressive	Albert Allnutt	3,672	39.1	+7.0
Labor	John Patterson	3,571	38.0	−2.3
Country	Albert Henshall	2,153	22.9	−4.7
Total formal votes		9,396	98.4	+0.1
Informal votes		150	1.6	−0.1
Turnout		9,546	90.0	−1.1
Two-party-preferred result
Country Progressive	Albert Allnutt	5,640	60.0	+2.5
Labor	John Patterson	3,657	40.0	−2.5
Country Progressive hold		Swing	+2.5	

1927 Victorian state election: Mildura
Party	Candidate	Votes	%	±%
Labor	James McDonald	3,251	40.3	
Country Progressive	Albert Allnutt	2,592	32.1	
Country	James Lochhead	2,229	27.6	
Total formal votes		8,072	98.0	
Informal votes		168	2.0	
Turnout		8,240	90.9	
Two-candidate-preferred result
Country Progressive	Albert Allnutt	4,639	57.5	
Labor	James McDonald	3,433	42.5	
Country Progressive gain from Labor		Swing		
