= Electoral results for the district of Dandenong =

Victoria, Australia, district election results

This is a list of electoral results for the Electoral district of Dandenong in Victorian state elections.

== Members for Dandenong ==
Member	Party	Term
William Keast	Conservative	1904–1917
William Keast	Comm Liberal	1904–1917
William Keast	Nationalist	1904–1917
Frank Groves	Nationalist	1917–1929
Herbert Cremean	Labor	1929–1932
Frank Groves	United Australia	1932–1937
Frank Field	Labor	1937–1947
William Dawnay-Mould	Liberal	1947–1952
William Dawnay-Mould	Electoral Reform League	1947–1952
Les Coates	Labor	1952–1955
Ray Wiltshire	Liberal	1955–1958
Len Reid	Liberal	1958–1969
Alan Lind	Labor	1969–1979
Rob Jolly	Labor	1979–1985
Terry Norris	Labor	1985–1992
John Pandazopoulos	Labor	1992–2014
Gabrielle Williams	Labor	2014–present

== Election results ==
=== Elections in the 2020s ===
2022 Victorian state election: Dandenong
Party	Candidate	Votes	%	±%
Labor	Gabrielle Williams	21,677	54.9	−9.6
Liberal	Karen Broadley	8,475	21.5	−1.2
Greens	Matthew Kirwan	3,215	8.1	+1.1
Family First	Audrey Harmse	2,719	6.9	+6.9
Freedom	Anthony Levchenko	1,478	3.7	+3.7
Animal Justice	Andrew Klop	982	2.5	+1.6
Liberal Democrats	Tham Turner	961	2.4	+2.4
Total formal votes		39,505	92.5	+1.2
Informal votes		3,195	7.5	−1.2
Turnout		42,700	84.0	−2.3
Two-party-preferred result
Labor	Gabrielle Williams	26,970	68.3	−4.8
Liberal	Karen Broadley	12,535	31.7	+4.8
Labor hold		Swing	−4.8	

=== Elections in the 2010s ===
2018 Victorian state election: Dandenong
Party	Candidate	Votes	%	±%
Labor	Gabrielle Williams	21,313	66.1	+13.3
Liberal	Virosh Perera	7,416	23.0	−6.0
Greens	Rhonda Garad	2,399	7.4	−0.3
Transport Matters	Afroz Ahmed	1,128	3.5	+3.5
Total formal votes		32,256	91.0	−0.7
Informal votes		3,181	9.0	+0.7
Turnout		35,437	83.7	−5.9
Two-party-preferred result
Labor	Gabrielle Williams	23,891	74.0	+11.1
Liberal	Virosh Perera	8,409	26.0	−11.1
Labor hold		Swing	+11.1	

2014 Victorian state election: Dandenong
Party	Candidate	Votes	%	±%
Labor	Gabrielle Williams	17,891	52.8	+1.6
Liberal	Joanna Palatsides	9,809	29.0	−0.1
Greens	John Gulzari	2,611	7.7	−0.8
Family First	Noelle Walker	2,097	6.2	+1.7
Rise Up Australia	Carlton King	950	2.8	+2.8
Independent	Dale Key	500	1.5	+1.5
Total formal votes		33,858	91.7	−0.8
Informal votes		3,064	8.3	+0.8
Turnout		36,922	89.6	−0.6
Two-party-preferred result
Labor	Gabrielle Williams	21,389	62.9	−1.2
Liberal	Joanna Palatsides	12,628	37.1	+1.2
Labor hold		Swing	−1.2	

2010 Victorian state election: Dandenong
Party	Candidate	Votes	%	±%
Labor	John Pandazopoulos	14,934	50.53	−8.00
Liberal	Dale Key	8,658	29.29	+4.38
Greens	Matthew Kirwan	2,591	8.77	+0.50
Democratic Labor	Christopher Blackburn	2,037	6.89	+6.89
Family First	Damien Latcham	1,337	4.52	−3.77
Total formal votes		29,557	92.57	−0.50
Informal votes		2,373	7.43	+0.50
Turnout		31,930	89.86	−1.29
Two-party-preferred result
Labor	John Pandazopoulos	18,887	63.87	−4.80
Liberal	Dale Key	10,686	36.13	+4.80
Labor hold		Swing	−4.80	

=== Elections in the 2000s ===
2006 Victorian state election: Dandenong
Party	Candidate	Votes	%	±%
Labor	John Pandazopoulos	17,126	58.53	−6.85
Liberal	Cameron Nicholls	7,287	24.91	−1.38
Family First	Peter Dorian	2,426	8.29	+8.29
Greens	Peter Blair	2,420	8.27	+1.97
Total formal votes		29,259	93.07	−1.19
Informal votes		2,178	6.93	+1.19
Turnout		31,437	91.15	−0.43
Two-party-preferred result
Labor	John Pandazopoulos	20,077	68.67	−1.64
Liberal	Cameron Nicholls	9,162	31.33	+1.64
Labor hold		Swing	−1.64	

2002 Victorian state election: Dandenong
Party	Candidate	Votes	%	±%
Labor	John Pandazopoulos	20,044	65.4	+6.1
Liberal	John Kelly	8,062	26.3	−10.7
Greens	Maree Kelly	1,933	6.3	+6.3
Independent	Janet Cox	412	1.3	+1.3
Independent	Earle Keegel	209	0.7	+0.7
Total formal votes		30,660	94.3	−1.2
Informal votes		1,867	5.7	+1.2
Turnout		32,527	91.6	
Two-party-preferred result
Labor	John Pandazopoulos	21,554	70.3	+8.7
Liberal	John Kelly	9,100	29.7	−8.7
Labor hold		Swing	+8.7	

=== Elections in the 1990s ===
1999 Victorian state election: Dandenong
Party	Candidate	Votes	%	±%
Labor	John Pandazopoulos	23,129	55.8	+2.5
Liberal	Astrid Miller	18,297	44.2	−2.5
Total formal votes		41,426	96.0	−0.4
Informal votes		1,733	4.0	+0.4
Turnout		43,159	93.7	
Labor hold		Swing	+2.5	

1996 Victorian state election: Dandenong
Party	Candidate	Votes	%	±%
Labor	John Pandazopoulos	17,908	49.6	+4.0
Liberal	Colin Madden	15,912	44.1	+2.8
Independent	Liz Mantell	1,115	3.1	+3.1
Call to Australia	Ken Cook	786	2.2	+2.2
Natural Law	Mary Anne Kruzycki	389	1.1	+1.1
Total formal votes		36,110	96.4	+3.0
Informal votes		1,338	3.6	−3.0
Turnout		37,448	94.3	
Two-party-preferred result
Labor	John Pandazopoulos	19,226	53.3	+0.2
Liberal	Colin Madden	16,837	46.7	−0.2
Labor hold		Swing	+0.2	

1992 Victorian state election: Dandenong
Party	Candidate	Votes	%	±%
Labor	John Pandazopoulos	13,386	45.6	−15.2
Liberal	Rodney Lavin	12,110	41.3	+2.6
Independent	Christine Ware	1,824	6.2	+6.2
Independent	Rob Wilson	1,584	5.4	+5.4
Independent	Ron Coomber	435	1.5	+1.5
Total formal votes		29,339	93.4	−0.7
Informal votes		2,060	6.6	+0.7
Turnout		31,399	94.9	
Two-party-preferred result
Labor	John Pandazopoulos	15,436	53.1	−8.1
Liberal	Rodney Lavin	13,661	46.9	+8.1
Labor hold		Swing	−8.1	

=== Elections in the 1980s ===
1988 Victorian state election: Dandenong
Party	Candidate	Votes	%	±%
Labor	Terry Norris	14,996	62.57	+1.50
Liberal	Poh Loh	8,971	37.43	−1.50
Total formal votes		23,967	93.12	−3.03
Informal votes		1,772	6.88	+3.03
Turnout		25,739	89.46	−2.52
Labor hold		Swing	+1.50	

1985 Victorian state election: Dandenong
Party	Candidate	Votes	%	±%
Labor	Terry Norris	15,970	61.1	+3.9
Liberal	Ian Fotheringham	10,182	38.9	−0.7
Total formal votes		26,152	96.1	
Informal votes		1,046	3.9	
Turnout		27,198	92.0	
Labor hold		Swing	+2.2	

1982 Victorian state election: Dandenong
Party	Candidate	Votes	%	±%
Labor	Rob Jolly	23,360	65.3	+14.2
Liberal	Mario Dodic	12,406	34.7	−3.5
Total formal votes		35,766	95.9	−0.4
Informal votes		1,530	4.1	+0.4
Turnout		37,296	94.2	0.0
Labor hold		Swing	+8.8	

=== Elections in the 1970s ===
1979 Victorian state election: Dandenong
Party	Candidate	Votes	%	±%
Labor	Rob Jolly	16,692	51.1	−4.1
Liberal	Francis Holohan	12,469	38.2	−6.6
Democrats	Janice Bateman	3,244	9.9	+9.9
Socialist Workers	Ruth Egg	250	0.8	+0.8
Total formal votes		32,655	96.3	−0.5
Informal votes		1,236	3.7	+0.5
Turnout		33,891	94.2	+1.3
Two-party-preferred result
Labor	Rob Jolly	18,444	56.5	+1.3
Liberal	Francis Holohan	14,211	43.5	−1.3
Labor hold		Swing	+1.3	

1976 Victorian state election: Dandenong
Party	Candidate	Votes	%	±%
Labor	Alan Lind	15,568	55.2	+3.6
Liberal	James Grayling	12,637	44.8	+4.1
Total formal votes		28,205	96.8	
Informal votes		920	3.2	
Turnout		29,125	92.9	
Labor hold		Swing	+2.8	

1973 Victorian state election: Dandenong
Party	Candidate	Votes	%	±%
Labor	Alan Lind	20,241	51.0	−0.4
Liberal	Ivan Warner	16,331	41.1	+5.9
Democratic Labor	Kevin Leydon	3,141	7.9	−5.6
Total formal votes		39,713	96.6	−0.3
Informal votes		1,386	3.4	+0.3
Turnout		41,099	95.0	−0.8
Two-party-preferred result
Labor	Alan Lind	20,712	52.2	−1.2
Liberal	Ivan Warner	19,001	47.8	+1.2
Labor hold		Swing	−1.2	

1970 Victorian state election: Dandenong
Party	Candidate	Votes	%	±%
Labor	Alan Lind	15,627	51.4	+8.4
Liberal	Wallace Werrett	10,706	35.2	−6.4
Democratic Labor	Kevin Leydon	4,102	13.5	−1.8
Total formal votes		30,435	96.9	0.0
Informal votes		983	3.1	0.0
Turnout		31,418	95.8	+0.3
Two-party-preferred result
Labor	Alan Lind	16,242	53.4	+6.6
Liberal	Wallace Werrett	14,193	46.6	−6.6
Labor gain from Liberal		Swing	+6.6	

=== Elections in the 1960s ===
1969 Dandenong state by-election
Party	Candidate	Votes	%	±%
Labor	Alan Lind	16,149	56.8	+13.8
Liberal	Wallace Werrett	11,681	41.1	−0.6
Independent	C Dubbeld	613	2.2	+2.2
Total formal votes		28,443	97.7	+0.8
Informal votes		666	2.3	−0.8
Turnout		29,109	89.6	−5.9
Labor gain from Liberal		Swing	N/A	

- Preferences were not distributed.

1967 Victorian state election: Dandenong
Party	Candidate	Votes	%	±%
Labor	Alan Lind	10,632	43.0	+1.7
Liberal	Len Reid	10,294	41.6	0.0
Democratic Labor	Kevin Leydon	3,792	15.3	−0.7
Total formal votes		24,718	96.9	
Informal votes		781	3.1	
Turnout		25,499	95.5	
Two-party-preferred result
Liberal	Len Reid	13,158	53.2	−0.9
Labor	Alan Lind	11,560	46.8	+0.9
Liberal hold		Swing	−0.9	

1964 Victorian state election: Dandenong
Party	Candidate	Votes	%	±%
Liberal and Country	Len Reid	17,953	43.2	+2.1
Labor	Alan Lind	16,558	39.9	−3.1
Democratic Labor	Kevin Leydon	6,518	15.7	−0.2
Communist	Francis McGarry	498	1.2	+1.2
Total formal votes		41,527	97.4	−0.5
Informal votes		1,099	2.6	+0.5
Turnout		42,626	94.6	0.0
Two-party-preferred result
Liberal and Country	Len Reid	23,090	55.6	+0.3
Labor	Alan Lind	18,437	44.4	−0.3
Liberal and Country hold		Swing	+0.3	

1961 Victorian state election: Dandenong
Party	Candidate	Votes	%	±%
Labor	Alan Lind	14,949	43.0	+1.3
Liberal and Country	Len Reid	14,290	41.1	−2.7
Democratic Labor	John Simmons	5,538	15.9	+1.5
Total formal votes		34,777	97.9	−0.3
Informal votes		762	2.1	+0.3
Turnout		35,539	94.6	+0.8
Two-party-preferred result
Liberal and Country	Len Reid	19,232	55.3	+1.8
Labor	Alan Lind	15,545	44.7	−1.8
Liberal and Country hold		Swing	+1.8	

=== Elections in the 1950s ===
1958 Victorian state election: Dandenong
Party	Candidate	Votes	%	±%
Liberal and Country	Len Reid	11,741	43.8	
Labor	Alan Lind	11,177	41.7	
Democratic Labor	Reginald Kearney	3,869	14.4	
Total formal votes		27,278	98.2	
Informal votes		491	1.8	
Turnout		27,278	93.8	
Two-party-preferred result
Liberal and Country	Len Reid	14,326	53.5	
Labor	Alan Lind	12,461	46.5	
Liberal and Country hold		Swing		

1955 Victorian state election: Dandenong
Party	Candidate	Votes	%	±%
Liberal and Country	Ray Wiltshire	16,130	47.7	
Labor	John Tripovich	12,678	37.5	
Labor (A-C)	Reginald Kearney	4,997	14.8	
Total formal votes		33,805	98.2	
Informal votes		604	1.8	
Turnout		34,409	94.3	
Two-party-preferred result
Liberal and Country	Ray Wiltshire	19,651	58.1	
Labor	John Tripovich	14,154	41.9	
Liberal and Country gain from Labor		Swing		

1952 Victorian state election: Dandenong
Party	Candidate	Votes	%	±%
Labor	Les Coates	23,350	55.4	+5.6
Electoral Reform	William Dawnay-Mould	14,609	34.7	+34.7
Independent	Walter Peterson	3,439	8.2	+8.2
Communist	Arthur O'Donoghue	742	1.8	+1.8
Total formal votes		42,120	97.9	−1.2
Informal votes		888	2.1	+1.2
Turnout		43,028	94.1	−0.5
Two-candidate-preferred result
Labor	Les Coates	24,362	57.8	+8.0
Electoral Reform	William Dawnay-Mould	17,778	42.2	+42.2
Labor gain from Liberal and Country		Swing	N/A	

1950 Victorian state election: Dandenong
Party	Candidate	Votes	%	±%
Liberal and Country	William Dawnay-Mould	16,521	50.2	+2.8
Labor	Les Coates	16,391	49.8	+5.9
Total formal votes		32,912	99.1	+0.5
Informal votes		302	0.9	−0.5
Turnout		33,214	94.6	+0.5
Liberal and Country hold		Swing	−5.0	

=== Elections in the 1940s ===
1947 Victorian state election: Dandenong
Party	Candidate	Votes	%	±%
Liberal	William Dawnay-Mould	12,149	47.4	+13.6
Labor	Frank Field	11,265	43.9	−8.1
Country	Alexander Caldwell	2,231	8.7	+8.7
Total formal votes		25,645	98.6	+1.7
Informal votes		375	1.4	−1.7
Turnout		26,020	94.1	+5.1
Two-party-preferred result
Liberal	William Dawnay-Mould	14,142	55.1	
Labor	Frank Field	11,503	44.9	
Liberal gain from Labor		Swing	N/A	

1945 Victorian state election: Dandenong
Party	Candidate	Votes	%	±%
Labor	Frank Field	10,764	52.0	
Liberal	Alexander Caldwell	7,007	33.8	
Independent	Gladys Roberts	2,260	10.9	
Independent Liberal	Clyde Hoffman	670	3.2	
Total formal votes		20,701	96.9	
Informal votes		656	3.1	
Turnout		21,357	89.0	
Labor hold		Swing		

- Preferences were not distributed.

1943 Victorian state election: Dandenong
Party	Candidate	Votes	%	±%
Labor	Frank Field	20,419	60.6	−0.2
Independent	Gladys Roberts	13,294	39.4	+39.4
Total formal votes		33,713	98.1	−0.8
Informal votes		670	1.9	+0.8
Turnout		34,383	86.6	−7.1
Labor hold		Swing	N/A	

1940 Victorian state election: Dandenong
Party	Candidate	Votes	%	±%
Labor	Frank Field	18,699	60.8	+10.2
United Australia	Leslie Sheppard	12,030	39.2	−10.2
Total formal votes		30,729	98.9	+0.2
Informal votes		349	1.1	−0.2
Turnout		31,078	93.7	−0.7
Labor hold		Swing	+10.2	

=== Elections in the 1930s ===
1937 Victorian state election: Dandenong
Party	Candidate	Votes	%	±%
Labor	Frank Field	14,374	50.6	+8.8
United Australia	Frank Groves	14,064	49.4	−8.8
Total formal votes		28,438	98.7	+0.3
Informal votes		363	1.3	−0.3
Turnout		28,801	94.4	0.0
Labor gain from United Australia		Swing	+8.8	

1935 Victorian state election: Dandenong
Party	Candidate	Votes	%	±%
United Australia	Frank Groves	15,104	58.2	−1.0
Labor	Edward Stewart	10,862	41.8	+1.0
Total formal votes		25,966	98.4	−0.6
Informal votes		430	1.6	+0.6
Turnout		26,396	94.4	+0.3
United Australia hold		Swing	−1.0	

1932 Victorian state election: Dandenong
Party	Candidate	Votes	%	±%
United Australia	Frank Groves	14,479	59.2	+12.3
Labor	Bert Cremean	9,973	40.8	−12.3
Total formal votes		24,452	99.0	−0.2
Informal votes		249	1.0	+0.2
Turnout		24,701	94.1	+1.1
United Australia gain from Labor		Swing	+12.3	

=== Elections in the 1920s ===
1929 Victorian state election: Dandenong
Party	Candidate	Votes	%	±%
Labor	Bert Cremean	12,085	53.1	+8.3
Nationalist	Frank Groves	10,663	46.9	+5.2
Total formal votes		22,748	99.2	+2.0
Informal votes		194	0.8	−2.0
Turnout		22,942	93.0	+1.9
Labor gain from Nationalist		Swing	+4.1	

1927 Victorian state election: Dandenong
Party	Candidate	Votes	%	±%
Labor	James O'Keefe	8,160	44.8	
Nationalist	Frank Groves	7,612	41.7	
Australian Liberal	Archibald Wilson	2,458	13.5	
Total formal votes		18,230	97.2	
Informal votes		518	2.8	
Turnout		18,748	91.1	
Two-party-preferred result
Nationalist	Frank Groves	9,292	51.0	
Labor	James O'Keefe	8,938	49.0	
Nationalist hold		Swing		

1924 Victorian state election: Dandenong
Party	Candidate	Votes	%	±%
Nationalist	Frank Groves	5,227	52.8	−15.9
Labor	Roy Beardsworth	3,128	31.6	+0.3
Independent	Henry Harris	1,545	15.6	+15.6
Total formal votes		9,900	98.1	−1.3
Informal votes		193	1.9	+1.3
Turnout		10,093	51.7	+6.0
Two-party-preferred result
Nationalist	Frank Groves		60.6	−8.1
Labor	Roy Beardsworth		39.4	+8.1
Nationalist hold		Swing	−8.1	

- Two party preferred vote was estimated.

1921 Victorian state election: Dandenong
Party	Candidate	Votes	%	±%
Nationalist	Frank Groves	5,538	68.7	+13.3
Labor	Roy Beardsworth	2,519	31.3	+6.4
Total formal votes		8,057	99.4	+8.2
Informal votes		48	0.6	−8.2
Turnout		8,105	45.7	−10.4
Nationalist hold		Swing	−4.5	

1920 Victorian state election: Dandenong
Party	Candidate	Votes	%	±%
Nationalist	Frank Groves	4,982	55.4	−3.2
Labor	Roy Beardsworth	2,236	24.9	+24.9
Victorian Farmers	Peter Gleeson	1,778	19.8	+19.8
Total formal votes		8,996	91.2	−6.1
Informal votes		864	8.8	+6.1
Turnout		9,860	56.1	+12.6
Two-party-preferred result
Nationalist	Frank Groves		73.2	
Labor	Roy Beardsworth		26.8	
Nationalist hold		Swing	N/A	

- Two party preferred was estimated.

=== Elections in the 1910s ===
1917 Victorian state election: Dandenong
Party	Candidate	Votes	%	±%
Nationalist	Frank Groves	3,914	58.6	
Nationalist	William Keast	2,764	41.4	
Total formal votes		6,678	97.3	
Informal votes		186	2.7	
Turnout		6,864	43.5	
Nationalist hold		Swing	N/A	

1914 Victorian state election: Dandenong
Party	Candidate	Votes	%	±%
Liberal	William Keast	unopposed		
Liberal hold		Swing		

1911 Victorian state election: Dandenong
Party	Candidate	Votes	%	±%
Liberal	William Keast	unopposed		
Liberal hold		Swing		
