= Results of the 1945 Victorian state election (Legislative Assembly) =

Australian state election results

Victorian state election, 10 November 1945 Legislative Assembly << 1943–1947 >>
| Enrolled voters | 1,019,063 | | | | |
| Votes cast | 896,561 | | Turnout | 87.98 | +0.98 |
| Informal votes | 18,689 | | Informal | 2.08 | −0.51 |
Summary of votes by party
| Party | Primary votes | % | Swing | Seats | Change |
| Labor | 360,079 | 41.02 | +4.89 | 31 | +9 |
| Country | 163,940 | 18.67 | +5.64 | 18 | ±0 |
| Liberal | 180,046 | 20.51 | −2.56 | 10 | −3 |
| Independent | 92,097 | 10.49 | −11.40 | 3 | −2 |
| Ministerial Liberal | 29,276 | 3.33 | +3.33 | 3 | +3 |
| Independent Liberal VIC | 27,351 | 3.12 | +3.12 | 0 | ±0 |
| Communist | 25,083 | 2.86 | −1.65 | 0 | ±0 |
| Total | 877,872 | | | 65 | |

This is a list of electoral district results for the Victorian 1945 election.

== Results by electoral district ==
=== Albert Park ===
1945 Victorian state election: Albert Park
| Party | Candidate | Votes | % | ±% |
|---|---|---|---|---|
| Labor | Frank Crean | 7,227 | 34.9 | |
| Ministerial | William Haworth | 6,333 | 30.6 | |
| Liberal | John Rasmussen | 3,638 | 17.6 | |
| Independent Socialist | James Coull | 3,514 | 17.0 | |
| Total formal votes | | 20,712 | 96.1 | |
| Informal votes | | 842 | 3.9 | |
| Turnout | | 21,554 | 84.8 | |
After distribution of preferences
| Labor | Frank Crean | 10,390 | 50.2 | |
| Ministerial | William Haworth | 6,574 | 31.7 | |
| Liberal | John Rasmussen | 3,748 | 18.1 | |
| Labor gain from Liberal | | Swing | | |

- Preferences were not distributed to completion.

=== Allandale ===
1945 Victorian state election: Allandale
| Party | Candidate | Votes | % | ±% |
|---|---|---|---|---|
| Labor | Patrick Denigan | 6,257 | 48.5 | |
| Country | Russell White | 3,965 | 30.7 | |
| Liberal | Albert Woodward | 2,692 | 20.8 | |
| Total formal votes | | 12,914 | 99.1 | |
| Informal votes | | 117 | 0.9 | |
| Turnout | | 13,031 | 90.2 | |
Two-party-preferred result
| Country | Russell White | 6,498 | 50.3 | |
| Labor | Patrick Denigan | 6,416 | 49.7 | |
| Country gain from Labor | | Swing | | |

=== Ballarat ===
1945 Victorian state election: Ballarat
| Party | Candidate | Votes | % | ±% |
|---|---|---|---|---|
| Liberal | Thomas Hollway | 9,884 | 52.6 | |
| Labor | Stanley Glover | 7,850 | 41.8 | |
| Communist | Albert Black | 1,036 | 5.5 | |
| Total formal votes | | 18,770 | 98.5 | |
| Informal votes | | 281 | 1.5 | |
| Turnout | | 19,051 | 91.6 | |
| Liberal hold | | Swing | | |

- Preferences were not distributed.

=== Barwon ===
1945 Victorian state election: Barwon
| Party | Candidate | Votes | % | ±% |
|---|---|---|---|---|
| Labor | Don Ferguson | 4,291 | 34.3 | |
| Ministerial | Thomas Maltby | 3,557 | 28.4 | |
| Country | James Henderson | 2,605 | 20.8 | |
| Liberal | Robert Shirra | 2,068 | 16.5 | |
| Total formal votes | | 12,521 | 98.3 | |
| Informal votes | | 213 | 1.7 | |
| Turnout | | 12,734 | 89.2 | |
Two-party-preferred result
| Ministerial | Thomas Maltby | 7,511 | 60.0 | |
| Labor | Don Ferguson | 5,010 | 40.0 | |
| Ministerial gain from Liberal | | Swing | | |

=== Benalla ===
1945 Victorian state election: Benalla
| Party | Candidate | Votes | % | ±% |
|---|---|---|---|---|
| Country | Frederick Cook | 6,125 | 54.7 | |
| Country | Percy Johnson | 5,077 | 45.3 | |
| Total formal votes | | 11,202 | 97.5 | |
| Informal votes | | 288 | 2.5 | |
| Turnout | | 11,490 | 88.8 | |
| Country hold | | Swing | | |

=== Benambra ===
1945 Victorian state election: Benambra
| Party | Candidate | Votes | % | ±% |
|---|---|---|---|---|
| Country | Roy Paton | 5,949 | 56.7 | |
| Labor | Charles Pollard | 4,537 | 43.3 | |
| Total formal votes | | 10,486 | 99.3 | |
| Informal votes | | 78 | 0.7 | |
| Turnout | | 10,564 | 85.9 | |
| Country hold | | Swing | | |

=== Bendigo ===
1945 Victorian state election: Bendigo
| Party | Candidate | Votes | % | ±% |
|---|---|---|---|---|
| Labor | Bill Galvin | unopposed | | |
| Labor hold | | Swing | | |

=== Borung ===
1945 Victorian state election: Borung
| Party | Candidate | Votes | % | ±% |
|---|---|---|---|---|
| Labor | Arthur Ackland | 3,680 | 31.8 | |
| Country | Wilfred Mibus | 3,159 | 27.3 | |
| Independent Country | Winton Turnbull | 2,273 | 19.7 | |
| Country | Finlay Cameron | 1,808 | 15.6 | |
| Independent | Florence Rodan | 645 | 5.6 | |
| Total formal votes | | 11,565 | 98.5 | |
| Informal votes | | 172 | 1.5 | |
| Turnout | | 11,737 | 90.3 | |
Two-party-preferred result
| Country | Wilfred Mibus | 6,794 | 58.7 | |
| Labor | Arthur Ackland | 4,771 | 41.3 | |
| Country hold | | Swing | | |

=== Box Hill ===
1945 Victorian state election: Box Hill
| Party | Candidate | Votes | % | ±% |
|---|---|---|---|---|
| Labor | Bob Gray | 11,204 | 51.0 | |
| Liberal | Ronald Emerson | 8,287 | 37.7 | |
| Independent | Ivy Weber | 2,490 | 11.3 | |
| Total formal votes | | 21,981 | 98.8 | |
| Informal votes | | 259 | 1.2 | |
| Turnout | | 22,240 | 88.3 | |
| Labor hold | | Swing | | |

- Preferences were not distributed.

=== Brighton ===
1945 Victorian state election: Brighton
| Party | Candidate | Votes | % | ±% |
|---|---|---|---|---|
| Liberal | Ray Tovell | 9,040 | 40.6 | |
| Labor | Val Doube | 6,746 | 30.3 | |
| Ministerial | Ian Macfarlan | 6,499 | 29.2 | |
| Total formal votes | | 22,285 | 98.7 | |
| Informal votes | | 283 | 1.3 | |
| Turnout | | 22,568 | 87.9 | |
Two-party-preferred result
| Liberal | Ray Tovell | 14,106 | 62.9 | |
| Labor | Val Doube | 8,269 | 37.1 | |
| Liberal hold | | Swing | | |

=== Brunswick ===
1945 Victorian state election: Brunswick
| Party | Candidate | Votes | % | ±% |
|---|---|---|---|---|
| Labor | James Jewell | 16,211 | 73.0 | |
| Liberal | Alfred Wall | 5,991 | 27.0 | |
| Total formal votes | | 22,202 | 98.7 | |
| Informal votes | | 300 | 1.3 | |
| Turnout | | 22,502 | 87.4 | |
| Labor hold | | Swing | | |

=== Camberwell ===
1945 Victorian state election: Camberwell
| Party | Candidate | Votes | % | ±% |
|---|---|---|---|---|
| Liberal | Robert Whately | 8,775 | 40.6 | |
| Independent | Walter Fordham | 6,542 | 30.3 | |
| Independent | Dora Nankivell | 3,476 | 16.1 | |
| Ministerial | Norman Mackay | 2,801 | 13.0 | |
| Total formal votes | | 21,594 | 97.5 | |
| Informal votes | | 549 | 2.5 | |
| Turnout | | 22,143 | 88.1 | |
Two-candidate-preferred result
| Liberal | Robert Whately | 11,556 | 53.5 | |
| Independent | Walter Fordham | 10,038 | 46.5 | |
| Liberal hold | | Swing | | |

=== Carlton ===
1945 Victorian state election: Carlton
| Party | Candidate | Votes | % | ±% |
|---|---|---|---|---|
| Labor | Bill Barry | 15,862 | 78.2 | |
| Communist | Gerald O'Day | 4,430 | 21.8 | |
| Total formal votes | | 20,292 | 92.9 | |
| Informal votes | | 1,554 | 7.1 | |
| Turnout | | 21,846 | 85.4 | |
| Labor hold | | Swing | | |

=== Caulfield ===
1945 Victorian state election: Caulfield
| Party | Candidate | Votes | % | ±% |
|---|---|---|---|---|
| Liberal | Alexander Dennett | 12,408 | 58.2 | |
| Independent | Andrew Hughes | 8,925 | 41.8 | |
| Total formal votes | | 21,333 | 98.1 | |
| Informal votes | | 415 | 1.9 | |
| Turnout | | 21,748 | 86.9 | |
| Liberal gain from Independent | | Swing | | |

=== Clifton Hill ===
1945 Victorian state election: Clifton Hill
| Party | Candidate | Votes | % | ±% |
|---|---|---|---|---|
| Labor | Jack Cremean | 13,115 | 58.4 | |
| Liberal | Neil McKay | 6,271 | 27.9 | |
| Communist | Kenneth Miller | 3,061 | 13.6 | |
| Total formal votes | | 22,447 | 97.3 | |
| Informal votes | | 612 | 2.7 | |
| Turnout | | 23,059 | 88.3 | |
| Labor hold | | Swing | | |

- Preferences were not distributed.

=== Coburg ===
1945 Victorian state election: Coburg
| Party | Candidate | Votes | % | ±% |
|---|---|---|---|---|
| Independent Labor | Charlie Mutton | 10,986 | 52.1 | |
| Labor | Arthur Lewis | 5,213 | 24.7 | |
| Liberal | Allen Bateman | 4,899 | 23.2 | |
| Total formal votes | | 21,098 | 98.4 | |
| Informal votes | | 341 | 1.6 | |
| Turnout | | 21,439 | 87.7 | |
| Independent Labor hold | | Swing | | |

- Preferences were not distributed.

=== Collingwood ===
1945 Victorian state election: Collingwood
| Party | Candidate | Votes | % | ±% |
|---|---|---|---|---|
| Labor | Tom Tunnecliffe | unopposed | | |
| Labor hold | | Swing | | |

=== Dandenong ===
1945 Victorian state election: Dandenong
| Party | Candidate | Votes | % | ±% |
|---|---|---|---|---|
| Labor | Frank Field | 10,764 | 52.0 | |
| Liberal | Alexander Caldwell | 7,007 | 33.8 | |
| Independent | Gladys Roberts | 2,260 | 10.9 | |
| Independent Liberal | Clyde Hoffman | 670 | 3.2 | |
| Total formal votes | | 20,701 | 96.9 | |
| Informal votes | | 656 | 3.1 | |
| Turnout | | 21,357 | 89.0 | |
| Labor hold | | Swing | | |

- Preferences were not distributed.

=== Dundas ===
1945 Victorian state election: Dundas
| Party | Candidate | Votes | % | ±% |
|---|---|---|---|---|
| Labor | Bill Slater | 8,022 | 65.1 | |
| Country | Arthur Carracher | 4,307 | 34.9 | |
| Total formal votes | | 12,329 | 98.8 | |
| Informal votes | | 144 | 1.2 | |
| Turnout | | 12,473 | 90.4 | |
| Labor hold | | Swing | | |

=== Elsternwick ===
1945 Victorian state election: Elsternwick
| Party | Candidate | Votes | % | ±% |
|---|---|---|---|---|
| Liberal | John Don | 10,019 | 49.9 | |
| Independent | Karl Dorr | 5,357 | 26.7 | |
| Ministerial | Roy Schilling | 4,880 | 23.3 | |
| Total formal votes | | 20,056 | 97.8 | |
| Informal votes | | 456 | 2.2 | |
| Turnout | | 20,512 | 88.0 | |
Two-candidate-preferred result
| Liberal | John Don | 11,347 | 56.6 | |
| Independent | Karl Dorr | 8,709 | 43.4 | |
| Liberal hold | | Swing | | |

=== Essendon ===
1945 Victorian state election: Essendon
| Party | Candidate | Votes | % | ±% |
|---|---|---|---|---|
| Labor | Arthur Drakeford Jr. | 14,007 | 63.4 | |
| Liberal | James Dillon | 8,073 | 36.6 | |
| Total formal votes | | 22,080 | 98.0 | |
| Informal votes | | 442 | 2.0 | |
| Turnout | | 22,522 | 89.7 | |
| Labor hold | | Swing | | |

=== Evelyn ===
1945 Victorian state election: Evelyn
| Party | Candidate | Votes | % | ±% |
|---|---|---|---|---|
| Labor | Clifford Wolfe | 4,610 | 39.3 | |
| Ministerial | William Everard | 3,668 | 31.3 | |
| Liberal | Frank Le Leu | 3,445 | 29.4 | |
| Total formal votes | | 11,723 | 98.5 | |
| Informal votes | | 175 | 1.5 | |
| Turnout | | 11,898 | 87.6 | |
Two-party-preferred result
| Ministerial | William Everard | 6,693 | 57.1 | |
| Labor | Clifford Wolfe | 5,030 | 42.9 | |
| Ministerial gain from Liberal | | Swing | | |

=== Footscray ===
1945 Victorian state election: Footscray
| Party | Candidate | Votes | % | ±% |
|---|---|---|---|---|
| Labor | Jack Holland | unopposed | | |
| Labor hold | | Swing | | |

=== Geelong ===
1945 Victorian state election: Geelong
| Party | Candidate | Votes | % | ±% |
|---|---|---|---|---|
| Labor | Fanny Brownbill | unopposed | | |
| Labor hold | | Swing | | |

=== Gippsland East ===
1945 Victorian state election: Gippsland East
| Party | Candidate | Votes | % | ±% |
|---|---|---|---|---|
| Country | Albert Lind | 6,812 | 65.2 | |
| Labor | Reuben Basham | 3,638 | 34.8 | |
| Total formal votes | | 10,450 | 99.2 | |
| Informal votes | | 87 | 0.8 | |
| Turnout | | 10,537 | 87.7 | |
| Country hold | | Swing | | |

=== Gippsland North ===
1945 Victorian state election: Gippsland North
| Party | Candidate | Votes | % | ±% |
|---|---|---|---|---|
| Labor | James Johns | 5,807 | 50.3 | |
| Country | Bill Fulton | 2,728 | 23.6 | |
| Country | William Moncur | 2,499 | 21.6 | |
| Independent | David White | 506 | 4.4 | |
| Total formal votes | | 11,540 | 98.5 | |
| Informal votes | | 177 | 1.5 | |
| Turnout | | 11,717 | 89.9 | |
| Labor gain from Country | | Swing | | |

- Preferences were not distributed.

=== Gippsland South ===
1945 Victorian state election: Gippsland South
| Party | Candidate | Votes | % | ±% |
|---|---|---|---|---|
| Country | Herbert Hyland | 7,788 | 63.0 | |
| Labor | Cecil Shellew | 4,576 | 37.0 | |
| Total formal votes | | 12,364 | 99.2 | |
| Informal votes | | 94 | 0.8 | |
| Turnout | | 12,458 | 89.7 | |
| Country hold | | Swing | | |

=== Gippsland West ===
1945 Victorian state election: Gippsland West
| Party | Candidate | Votes | % | ±% |
|---|---|---|---|---|
| Country | Matthew Bennett | 6,707 | 53.9 | |
| Labor | Robert Baker | 4,044 | 32.5 | |
| Independent | George Calderwood | 1,687 | 13.6 | |
| Total formal votes | | 12,438 | 98.5 | |
| Informal votes | | 193 | 1.5 | |
| Turnout | | 12,631 | 87.8 | |
| Country hold | | Swing | | |

=== Glen Iris ===
1945 Victorian state election: Glen Iris
| Party | Candidate | Votes | % | ±% |
|---|---|---|---|---|
| Liberal | Alan Moir | 8,305 | 40.6 | |
| Independent | Ian McLaren | 6,223 | 30.4 | |
| Labor | Thomas Brennan | 5,921 | 29.0 | |
| Total formal votes | | 20,449 | 98.6 | |
| Informal votes | | 287 | 1.4 | |
| Turnout | | 20,736 | 87.9 | |
Two-candidate-preferred result
| Independent | Ian McLaren | 11,646 | 57.0 | |
| Liberal | Alan Moir | 8,803 | 43.0 | |
| Independent gain from Liberal | | Swing | | |

=== Goulburn ===
1945 Victorian state election: Goulburn
| Party | Candidate | Votes | % | ±% |
|---|---|---|---|---|
| Labor | Joseph Smith | 4,970 | 45.5 | |
| Liberal | Philip Grimwade | 2,374 | 21.7 | |
| Independent Country | Edwin Mackrell | 1,822 | 16.7 | |
| Country | Cyril Davy | 1,748 | 16.0 | |
| Total formal votes | | 10,914 | 98.9 | |
| Informal votes | | 118 | 1.1 | |
| Turnout | | 11,032 | 87.2 | |
Two-party-preferred result
| Labor | Joseph Smith | 5,664 | 51.9 | |
| Liberal | Phillip Grimwade | 5,250 | 48.1 | |
| Labor gain from Country | | Swing | | |

=== Grant ===
1945 Victorian state election: Grant
| Party | Candidate | Votes | % | ±% |
|---|---|---|---|---|
| Country | Frederick Holden | 5,280 | 42.0 | |
| Labor | Geoffrey Ryan | 5,257 | 41.8 | |
| Liberal | Albert Pennell | 2,035 | 16.2 | |
| Total formal votes | | 12,572 | 98.7 | |
| Informal votes | | 171 | 1.3 | |
| Turnout | | 12,743 | 86.5 | |
Two-party-preferred result
| Country | Frederick Holden | 7,123 | 56.6 | |
| Labor | Geoffrey Ryan | 5,449 | 43.4 | |
| Country hold | | Swing | | |

=== Hampden ===
1945 Victorian state election: Hampden
| Party | Candidate | Votes | % | ±% |
|---|---|---|---|---|
| Labor | Raymond Hyatt | 5,458 | 44.0 | |
| Country | Harold McLennan | 2,417 | 19.5 | |
| Liberal | Henry Bolte | 2,317 | 18.7 | |
| Ministerial | William Cumming | 2,224 | 17.9 | |
| Total formal votes | | 12,416 | 98.0 | |
| Informal votes | | 254 | 2.0 | |
| Turnout | | 12,670 | 89.7 | |
Two-party-preferred result
| Labor | Raymond Hyatt | 6,506 | 52.4 | |
| Liberal | Henry Bolte | 5,910 | 47.6 | |
| Labor gain from Liberal | | Swing | | |

=== Hawthorn ===
1945 Victorian state election: Hawthorn
| Party | Candidate | Votes | % | ±% |
|---|---|---|---|---|
| Labor | Charles Murphy | 7,738 | 35.4 | |
| Liberal | Fred Edmunds | 7,139 | 32.7 | |
| Independent | Leslie Hollins | 6,975 | 31.9 | |
| Total formal votes | | 21,852 | 98.0 | |
| Informal votes | | 443 | 2.0 | |
| Turnout | | 22,295 | 87.6 | |
Two-party-preferred result
| Liberal | Fred Edmunds | 12,062 | 55.2 | |
| Labor | Charles Murphy | 9,790 | 44.8 | |
| Liberal gain from Independent | | Swing | | |

=== Ivanhoe ===
1945 Victorian state election: Ivanhoe
| Party | Candidate | Votes | % | ±% |
|---|---|---|---|---|
| Independent | Robert Gardner | 10,162 | 51.0 | |
| Liberal | Maxwell Dunn | 9,756 | 49.0 | |
| Total formal votes | | 19,918 | 97.9 | |
| Informal votes | | 419 | 2.1 | |
| Turnout | | 20,337 | 87.0 | |
| Independent gain from Liberal | | Swing | | |

=== Kew ===
1945 Victorian state election: Kew
| Party | Candidate | Votes | % | ±% |
|---|---|---|---|---|
| Liberal | Wilfrid Kent Hughes | unopposed | | |
| Liberal hold | | Swing | | |

=== Korong ===
1945 Victorian state election: Korong
| Party | Candidate | Votes | % | ±% |
|---|---|---|---|---|
| Country | Albert Dunstan | 7,662 | 67.8 | |
| Labor | William Casey | 3,647 | 32.2 | |
| Total formal votes | | 11,309 | 99.2 | |
| Informal votes | | 91 | 0.8 | |
| Turnout | | 11,400 | 88.5 | |
| Country hold | | Swing | | |

=== Malvern ===
1945 Victorian state election: Malvern
| Party | Candidate | Votes | % | ±% |
|---|---|---|---|---|
| Liberal | Trevor Oldham | unopposed | | |
| Liberal hold | | Swing | | |

=== Melbourne ===
1945 Victorian state election: Melbourne
| Party | Candidate | Votes | % | ±% |
|---|---|---|---|---|
| Labor | Tom Hayes | unopposed | | |
| Labor hold | | Swing | | |

=== Mentone ===
1945 Victorian state election: Mentone
| Party | Candidate | Votes | % | ±% |
|---|---|---|---|---|
| Labor | George White | 10,768 | 49.9 | |
| Liberal | John Warren | 7,708 | 35.7 | |
| Independent | Robert Roberts | 3,095 | 14.4 | |
| Total formal votes | | 21,571 | 98.4 | |
| Informal votes | | 346 | 1.6 | |
| Turnout | | 21,917 | 88.8 | |
Two-party-preferred result
| Labor | George White | 11,633 | 53.9 | |
| Liberal | John Warren | 9,938 | 46.1 | |
| Labor gain from Liberal | | Swing | | |

=== Mernda ===
1945 Victorian state election: Mernda
| Party | Candidate | Votes | % | ±% |
|---|---|---|---|---|
| Country | Leslie Webster | 3,991 | 34.0 | |
| Labor | Arthur Turtle | 3,880 | 33.1 | |
| Liberal | Arthur Ireland | 3,847 | 32.8 | |
| Total formal votes | | 11,718 | 98.2 | |
| Informal votes | | 220 | 1.8 | |
| Turnout | | 11,938 | 87.2 | |
Two-party-preferred result
| Country | Leslie Webster | 6,898 | 58.9 | |
| Labor | Arthur Turtle | 4,820 | 41.1 | |
| Country hold | | Swing | | |

=== Midlands ===
1945 Victorian state election: Midlands
| Party | Candidate | Votes | % | ±% |
|---|---|---|---|---|
| Labor | Clive Stoneham | 7,621 | 59.6 | |
| Country | Thomas Grigg | 5,166 | 40.4 | |
| Total formal votes | | 12,787 | 99.3 | |
| Informal votes | | 96 | 0.7 | |
| Turnout | | 12,883 | 90.9 | |
| Labor hold | | Swing | | |

=== Mildura ===
1945 Victorian state election: Mildura
| Party | Candidate | Votes | % | ±% |
|---|---|---|---|---|
| Labor | Louis Garlick | 4,797 | 43.7 | |
| Country | Nathaniel Barclay | 3,144 | 28.6 | |
| Independent Country | Albert Allnutt | 2,582 | 23.5 | |
| Country | John Edey | 461 | 4.2 | |
| Total formal votes | | 10,984 | 97.6 | |
| Informal votes | | 269 | 2.4 | |
| Turnout | | 11,253 | 86.0 | |
Two-party-preferred result
| Labor | Louis Garlick | 5,620 | 51.2 | |
| Country | Nathaniel Barclay | 5,364 | 48.8 | |
| Labor gain from Independent | | Swing | | |

=== Moonee Ponds ===
1945 Victorian state election: Moonee Ponds
| Party | Candidate | Votes | % | ±% |
|---|---|---|---|---|
| Labor | Samuel Merrifield | unopposed | | |
| Labor hold | | Swing | | |

=== Mornington ===
1945 Victorian state election: Mornington
| Party | Candidate | Votes | % | ±% |
|---|---|---|---|---|
| Country | Alfred Kirton | 6,205 | 54.5 | |
| Liberal | Frank Sharpe | 5,188 | 45.5 | |
| Total formal votes | | 11,393 | 97.1 | |
| Informal votes | | 337 | 2.9 | |
| Turnout | | 11,730 | 83.8 | |
| Country hold | | Swing | | |

=== Murray Valley ===
1945 Victorian state election: Murray Valley
| Party | Candidate | Votes | % | ±% |
|---|---|---|---|---|
| Labor | John McCabe | 4,679 | 40.9 | |
| Country | George Moss | 4,224 | 36.9 | |
| Independent Country | Percy Snowden | 2,551 | 22.3 | |
| Total formal votes | | 11,454 | 98.8 | |
| Informal votes | | 137 | 1.2 | |
| Turnout | | 11,591 | 85.5 | |
Two-party-preferred result
| Country | George Moss | 6,263 | 54.7 | |
| Labor | John McCabe | 5,191 | 45.3 | |
| Country hold | | Swing | | |

=== Northcote ===
1945 Victorian state election: Northcote
| Party | Candidate | Votes | % | ±% |
|---|---|---|---|---|
| Labor | John Cain | unopposed | | |
| Labor hold | | Swing | | |

=== Oakleigh ===
1945 Victorian state election: Oakleigh
| Party | Candidate | Votes | % | ±% |
|---|---|---|---|---|
| Labor | Squire Reid | 13,683 | 63.2 | |
| Liberal | James Smith | 7,959 | 36.8 | |
| Total formal votes | | 21,649 | 98.9 | |
| Informal votes | | 229 | 1.1 | |
| Turnout | | 21,871 | 89.6 | |
| Labor hold | | Swing | | |

=== Polwarth ===
1945 Victorian state election: Polwarth
| Party | Candidate | Votes | % | ±% |
|---|---|---|---|---|
| Country | Edward Guye | 7,625 | 62.6 | |
| Labor | Thomas Carmody | 4,555 | 37.4 | |
| Total formal votes | | 12,180 | 99.1 | |
| Informal votes | | 111 | 0.9 | |
| Turnout | | 12,291 | 89.4 | |
| Country hold | | Swing | | |

=== Portland ===
1945 Victorian state election: Portland
| Party | Candidate | Votes | % | ±% |
|---|---|---|---|---|
| Labor | Robert Holt | 6,913 | 54.5 | |
| Country | Harry Hedditch | 5,779 | 45.5 | |
| Total formal votes | | 12,692 | 99.5 | |
| Informal votes | | 66 | 0.5 | |
| Turnout | | 12,758 | 90.8 | |
| Labor gain from Country | | Swing | | |

=== Port Melbourne ===
1945 Victorian state election: Port Melbourne
| Party | Candidate | Votes | % | ±% |
|---|---|---|---|---|
| Labor | Tom Corrigan | 16,777 | 76.4 | |
| Communist | Ralph Gibson | 5,177 | 23.6 | |
| Total formal votes | | 21,954 | 95.3 | |
| Informal votes | | 1,076 | 4.7 | |
| Turnout | | 23,030 | 86.1 | |
| Labor hold | | Swing | | |

=== Prahran ===
1945 Victorian state election: Prahran
| Party | Candidate | Votes | % | ±% |
|---|---|---|---|---|
| Labor | Bill Quirk | 11,949 | 53.4 | |
| Liberal | Peter Isaacson | 8,977 | 40.1 | |
| Independent Labor | Arthur Jackson | 1,459 | 6.5 | |
| Total formal votes | | 22,385 | 97.8 | |
| Informal votes | | 495 | 2.2 | |
| Turnout | | 22,880 | 85.6 | |
| Labor gain from Liberal | | Swing | | |

- Preferences were not distributed.

=== Preston ===
1945 Victorian state election: Preston
| Party | Candidate | Votes | % | ±% |
|---|---|---|---|---|
| Labor | William Ruthven | 10,200 | 47.3 | |
| Ministerial | Henry Zwar | 9,779 | 45.3 | |
| Independent | Albert Davis | 1,590 | 7.4 | |
| Total formal votes | | 21,569 | 98.5 | |
| Informal votes | | 335 | 1.5 | |
| Turnout | | 21,904 | 91.5 | |
Two-candidate-preferred result
| Labor | William Ruthven | 10,856 | 50.3 | |
| Ministerial | Henry Zwar | 10,713 | 49.7 | |
| Labor gain from Liberal | | Swing | | |

=== Rainbow ===
1945 Victorian state election: Rainbow
| Party | Candidate | Votes | % | ±% |
|---|---|---|---|---|
| Country | Keith Dodgshun | 7,156 | 63.9 | |
| Labor | John Tripovich | 4,042 | 36.1 | |
| Total formal votes | | 11,198 | 99.4 | |
| Informal votes | | 65 | 0.6 | |
| Turnout | | 11,263 | 89.2 | |
| Country hold | | Swing | | |

=== Richmond ===
1945 Victorian state election: Richmond
| Party | Candidate | Votes | % | ±% |
|---|---|---|---|---|
| Labor | Stan Keon | 16,621 | 75.9 | |
| Communist | Bart Flannagan | 5,288 | 24.1 | |
| Total formal votes | | 21,909 | 94.0 | |
| Informal votes | | 1,402 | 6.0 | |
| Turnout | | 23,311 | 86.6 | |
| Labor hold | | Swing | | |

=== Ripon ===
1945 Victorian state election: Ripon
| Party | Candidate | Votes | % | ±% |
|---|---|---|---|---|
| Labor | Ernie Morton | 6,424 | 51.6 | |
| Country | Alec McDonald | 6,031 | 48.4 | |
| Total formal votes | | 12,455 | 99.4 | |
| Informal votes | | 69 | 0.6 | |
| Turnout | | 12,524 | 90.0 | |
| Labor gain from Country | | Swing | | |

=== Rodney ===
1945 Victorian state election: Rodney
| Party | Candidate | Votes | % | ±% |
|---|---|---|---|---|
| Country | Richard Brose | 4,803 | 38.3 | |
| Labor | George White | 3,941 | 31.5 | |
| Country | Wollaston Heily | 2,370 | 18.9 | |
| Independent | Morton Garner | 1,416 | 11.3 | |
| Total formal votes | | 12,530 | 98.8 | |
| Informal votes | | 157 | 1.2 | |
| Turnout | | 12,687 | 90.0 | |
Two-party-preferred result
| Country | Richard Brose | 7,867 | 62.8 | |
| Labor | George White | 4,663 | 37.2 | |
| Country hold | | Swing | | |

=== Scoresby ===
1945 Victorian state election: Scoresby
| Party | Candidate | Votes | % | ±% |
|---|---|---|---|---|
| Liberal | George Knox | unopposed | | |
| Liberal hold | | Swing | | |

=== Shepparton ===
1945 Victorian state election: Shepparton
| Party | Candidate | Votes | % | ±% |
|---|---|---|---|---|
| Country | John McDonald | 8,116 | 63.0 | |
| Labor | Frederick Hargreaves | 4,775 | 37.0 | |
| Total formal votes | | 12,891 | 99.3 | |
| Informal votes | | 91 | 0.7 | |
| Turnout | | 12,982 | 87.9 | |
| Country hold | | Swing | | |

=== St Kilda ===
1945 Victorian state election: St Kilda
| Party | Candidate | Votes | % | ±% |
|---|---|---|---|---|
| Labor | George Dethbridge | 9,326 | 44.8 | |
| Ministerial | Archie Michaelis | 6,229 | 29.9 | |
| Liberal | Leslie Lord | 5,284 | 25.3 | |
| Total formal votes | | 20,839 | 97.5 | |
| Informal votes | | 534 | 2.5 | |
| Turnout | | 21,373 | 86.0 | |
Two-party-preferred result
| Ministerial | Archie Michaelis | 10,532 | 50.5 | |
| Labor | George Dethbridge | 10,307 | 49.5 | |
| Ministerial gain from Liberal | | Swing | | |

=== Sunshine ===
1945 Victorian state election: Sunshine
| Party | Candidate | Votes | % | ±% |
|---|---|---|---|---|
| Labor | Ernie Shepherd | unopposed | | |
| Labor hold | | Swing | | |

=== Swan Hill ===
1945 Victorian state election: Swan Hill
| Party | Candidate | Votes | % | ±% |
|---|---|---|---|---|
| Independent Country | John Hipworth | 4,515 | 39.5 | |
| Labor | William Kent | 3,493 | 30.5 | |
| Country | Francis Old | 3,429 | 30.0 | |
| Total formal votes | | 11,437 | 98.2 | |
| Informal votes | | 208 | 1.8 | |
| Turnout | | 11,645 | 86.8 | |
Two-party-preferred result
| Independent Country | John Hipworth | 6,962 | 60.9 | |
| Labor | William Kent | 4,475 | 39.1 | |
| Independent Country gain from Country | | Swing | | |

=== Toorak ===
1945 Victorian state election: Toorak
| Party | Candidate | Votes | % | ±% |
|---|---|---|---|---|
| Liberal | Harold Thonemann | 5,627 | 28.3 | |
| Independent Labor | John Smith | 4,518 | 22.8 | |
| Independent Liberal | Robert Hamilton | 4,278 | 21.5 | |
| Independent Labor | Albert Nicholls | 3,316 | 16.7 | |
| Independent Liberal | Charles Kennett | 1,348 | 6.8 | |
| Ministerial | Robert Bruce | 766 | 3.9 | |
| Total formal votes | | 19,853 | 93.8 | |
| Informal votes | | 1,303 | 6.2 | |
| Turnout | | 21,156 | 82.6 | |
Two-candidate-preferred result
| Independent Liberal | Robert Hamilton | 11,813 | 59.5 | |
| Independent Labor | John Smith | 8,040 | 40.5 | |
| Independent Liberal gain from Liberal | | Swing | | |

=== Warrnambool ===
1945 Victorian state election: Warrnambool
| Party | Candidate | Votes | % | ±% |
|---|---|---|---|---|
| Country | Henry Bailey | 6,358 | 51.6 | |
| Labor | James Farrell | 5,973 | 48.4 | |
| Total formal votes | | 12,331 | 98.8 | |
| Informal votes | | 143 | 1.2 | |
| Turnout | | 12,474 | 89.9 | |
| Country hold | | Swing | | |

=== Williamstown ===
1945 Victorian state election: Williamstown
| Party | Candidate | Votes | % | ±% |
|---|---|---|---|---|
| Labor | John Lemmon | 11,421 | 51.1 | |
| Communist | Alexander Dobbin | 6,091 | 27.3 | |
| Liberal | William Gray | 4,828 | 21.6 | |
| Total formal votes | | 22,340 | 98.3 | |
| Informal votes | | 381 | 1.7 | |
| Turnout | | 22,721 | 89.9 | |
| Labor hold | | Swing | | |

- Preferences were not distributed.

=== Wonthaggi ===
1945 Victorian state election: Wonthaggi
| Party | Candidate | Votes | % | ±% |
|---|---|---|---|---|
| Labor | William McKenzie | 7,589 | 57.3 | |
| Country | Alexander Shackleford | 5,658 | 42.7 | |
| Total formal votes | | 13,247 | 99.2 | |
| Informal votes | | 108 | 0.8 | |
| Turnout | | 13,355 | 89.9 | |
| Labor hold | | Swing | | |

== See also ==
- 1945 Victorian state election
- Members of the Victorian Legislative Assembly, 1945–1947
