= 1962 Mildura state by-election =

- 12 May 1962

Electoral district of Mildura in the Victorian Legislative Assembly
- Registered: 20,870
- Turnout: 93.6% (▼1.8)
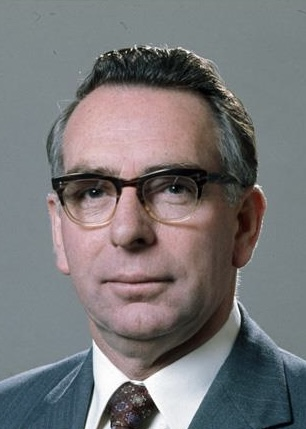
	First party	Second party	Third party
		ALP	L&C
Candidate	Milton Whiting	Arthur Lawton	Geoffrey Harding
Party	Country	Labor	Liberal and Country
Primary vote	8,723	6,030	2,488
Percentage	45.5%	31.4%	13.0%
Swing	▼14.0	▲8.1	▲4.2
TCP	63.4%	36.6%
TCP swing	▼11.1	▲11.1
MP before election
Nathaniel Barclay
Country
Elected MP
Milton Whiting
Country

The 1962 Mildura state by-election was held on 27 October 1962 to elect the member for Mildura in the Victorian Legislative Assembly, following the death of Country Party MP Nathaniel Barclay.

Milton Whiting retained the seat for the Country Party, despite a two-candidate-preferred swing of 11.1% towards Labor candidate Arthur Lawton.

== Results ==
1962 Mildura state by-election
Party	Candidate	Votes	%	±%
Country	Milton Whiting	8,723	45.5	−14.0
Labor	Arthur Lawton	6,030	31.4	+8.1
Liberal and Country	Geoffrey Harding	2,488	13.0	+4.2
Democratic Labor	William McInerney	1,489	7.8	−1.6
Independent	George Eggleton	460	2.4	+2.4
Total formal votes		19,190	98.2	+0.8
Informal votes		348	1.8	−0.8
Turnout		19,538	93.6	−1.8
Two-party-preferred result
Country	Milton Whiting	12,174	63.4	−11.1
Labor	Arthur Lawton	7,016	36.6	+11.1
Country hold		Swing	−11.1	

== See also ==
- Electoral results for the district of Mildura
- List of Victorian state by-elections
