= Electoral results for the district of Doveton =

Australian district election results

This is a list of electoral results for the electoral district of Doveton in Victorian state elections.

== Members ==
Member	Party	Term
Rob Jolly	Labor	1985–1992

== Election results ==
=== Elections in the 1980s ===
1988 Victorian state election: Doveton
Party	Candidate	Votes	%	±%
Labor	Rob Jolly	20,697	58.28	−6.60
Liberal	Rodney Lavin	14,816	41.72	+6.60
Total formal votes		35,513	94.41	−2.40
Informal votes		2,101	5.59	+2.40
Turnout		37,614	93.56	−0.39
Labor hold		Swing	−6.60	

1985 Victorian state election: Doveton
Party	Candidate	Votes	%	±%
Labor	Rob Jolly	17,116	64.9	+1.6
Liberal	Matthew Starr	9,264	35.1	−0.7
Total formal votes		26,380	96.8	
Informal votes		870	3.2	
Turnout		27,250	94.0	
Labor hold		Swing	+0.4	
