= Electoral results for the district of Moorabbin =

Australian district election results

This is a list of electoral results for the electoral district of Moorabbin in Victorian state elections.

== Members for Moorabbin ==
Member	Party	Term
Bob Suggett	Liberal	1955–1961
Bob Suggett	Independent	1961–1964
Bob Suggett	Liberal	1964–1967
Llew Reese	Liberal	1967–1976

== Election results ==
=== Elections in the 1970s ===
1973 Victorian state election: Moorabbin
Party	Candidate	Votes	%	±%
Liberal	Llew Reese	14,301	51.3	+6.7
Labor	Harry Rourke	11,360	40.7	−0.7
Democratic Labor	Salvatore Pinzone	2,236	8.0	−6.0
Total formal votes		27,897	97.6	+0.2
Informal votes		695	2.4	−0.2
Turnout		28,592	94.0	−1.3
Two-party-preferred result
Liberal	Llew Reese	16,201	58.1	+0.8
Labor	Harry Rourke	11,696	41.9	−0.8
Liberal hold		Swing	+0.8	

1970 Victorian state election: Moorabbin
Party	Candidate	Votes	%	±%
Liberal	Llew Reese	11,341	44.6	−1.5
Labor	Harry Rourke	10,527	41.4	+3.5
Democratic Labor	Salvatore Pinzone	3,562	14.0	−2.0
Total formal votes		25,340	97.4	−0.1
Informal votes		688	2.6	+0.1
Turnout		26,118	95.3	+0.9
Two-party-preferred result
Liberal	Llew Reese	14,573	57.3	−3.6
Labor	Harry Rourke	10,857	42.7	+3.6
Liberal hold		Swing	−3.6	

=== Elections in the 1960s ===
1967 Victorian state election: Moorabbin
Party	Candidate	Votes	%	±%
Liberal	Llew Reese	11,104	46.1	−0.7
Labor	Harry Rourke	9,115	37.9	−1.4
Democratic Labor	Richard Neilson	3,860	16.0	+2.7
Total formal votes		24,079	97.5	
Informal votes		613	2.5	
Turnout		24,692	94.4	
Two-party-preferred result
Liberal	Llew Reese	14,658	60.9	+2.2
Labor	Harry Rourke	9,421	39.1	−2.2
Liberal hold		Swing	+2.2	

1964 Victorian state election: Moorabbin
Party	Candidate	Votes	%	±%
Liberal and Country	Bob Suggett	15,477	48.7	+23.3
Labor	Ken Farrall	11,889	37.4	−1.0
Democratic Labor	Thomas McDonald	4,445	14.0	−0.5
Total formal votes		31,811	98.5	+0.1
Informal votes		479	1.5	−0.1
Turnout		32,290	95.0	−0.8
Two-party-preferred result
Liberal and Country	Bob Suggett	19,413	61.0	+61.0
Labor	Ken Farrall	12,398	39.0	−2.3
Liberal and Country gain from Independent Liberal		Swing	N/A	

1961 Victorian state election: Moorabbin
Party	Candidate	Votes	%	±%
Labor	Les Coates	11,164	38.4	−0.8
Liberal and Country	Llew Reese	7,389	25.4	−23.3
Independent Liberal	Bob Suggett	6,267	21.6	+21.6
Democratic Labor	James Healy	4,220	14.5	+2.4
Total formal votes		29,040	98.4	0.0
Informal votes		472	1.6	0.0
Turnout		29,512	95.8	+0.8
Two-candidate-preferred result
Independent Liberal	Bob Suggett	17,051	58.7	+58.7
Labor	Les Coates	11,989	41.3	+0.7
Independent Liberal gain from Liberal and Country		Swing	N/A	

=== Elections in the 1950s ===
1958 Victorian state election: Moorabbin
Party	Candidate	Votes	%	±%
Liberal and Country	Bob Suggett	11,939	48.7	
Labor	Les Coates	9,602	39.2	
Democratic Labor	Desmond Ward	2,966	12.1	
Total formal votes		24,507	98.4	
Informal votes		386	1.6	
Turnout		24,893	95.0	
Two-party-preferred result
Liberal and Country	Bob Suggett	14,552	59.4	
Labor	Les Coates	9,955	40.6	
Liberal and Country hold		Swing		

1955 Victorian state election:Moorabbin
Party	Candidate	Votes	%	±%
Liberal and Country	Bob Suggett	11,869	40.0	
Labor	Les Coates	11,673	39.4	
Labor (A-C)	Edward White	3,126	10.5	
Victorian Liberal	William Dawnay-Mould	2,985	10.1	
Total formal votes		29,653	98.0	
Informal votes		591	2.0	
Turnout		30,244	95.1	
Two-party-preferred result
Liberal and Country	Bob Suggett	17,185	57.9	
Labor	Les Coates	12,468	42.1	
Liberal and Country gain from Labor		Swing		
