= Electoral results for the district of Clifton Hill =

Victoria, Australia, district election results

This is a list of electoral results for the electoral district of Clifton Hill in Victorian state elections.

== Members for Clifton Hill ==
Member	Party	Term
Maurice Blackburn	Labor	1927–1934
Bert Cremean	Labor	1934–1945
Jack Cremean	Labor	1945–1949
Joseph O'Carroll	Labor	1949–1955
Joseph O'Carroll	Labor (Anti-Communist)	1955

== Election results ==
=== Elections in the 1950s ===
1952 Victorian state election: Clifton Hill
Party	Candidate	Votes	%	±%
Labor	Joseph O'Carroll	unopposed		
Labor hold		Swing		

1950 Victorian state election: Clifton Hill
Party	Candidate	Votes	%	±%
Labor	Joseph O'Carroll	16,004	67.7	+4.0
Liberal and Country	Kenneth Withers	7,633	32.3	−4.0
Total formal votes		23,637	98.6	−0.2
Informal votes		331	1.4	+0.2
Turnout		23,968	94.3	+1.1
Labor hold		Swing	+4.0	

=== Elections in the 1940s ===
1949 Clifton Hill state by-election
Party	Candidate	Votes	%	±%
Labor	Joseph O'Carroll	13,829	64.8	+0.9
Liberal and Country	Ivan Soden	6,436	30.2	−6.1
Communist	Andrew Wallace	1,069	5.0	+5.0
Total formal votes		21,334	98.8	0.0
Informal votes		260	1.2	0.0
Turnout		21,594	80.7	−12.5
Labor hold		Swing	N/A	

- Preferences were not distributed.

1947 Victorian state election: Clifton Hill
Party	Candidate	Votes	%	±%
Labor	Jack Cremean	15,798	63.7	+5.3
Liberal	Neil McKay	9,002	36.3	+8.4
Total formal votes		24,800	98.8	+1.5
Informal votes		312	1.2	−1.5
Turnout		25,112	93.2	+4.9
Labor hold		Swing	N/A	

1945 Victorian state election: Clifton Hill
Party	Candidate	Votes	%	±%
Labor	Jack Cremean	13,115	58.4	
Liberal	Neil McKay	6,271	27.9	
Communist	Kenneth Miller	3,061	13.6	
Total formal votes		22,447	97.3	
Informal votes		612	2.7	
Turnout		23,059	88.3	
Labor hold		Swing		

- Preferences were not distributed.

1945 Clifton Hill state by-election
Party	Candidate	Votes	%	±%
Labor	Jack Cremean	12,728	69.6	+16.6
Communist	Kenneth Miller	5,555	30.4	+11.5
Total formal votes		18,283	95.2	−1.1
Informal votes		924	4.8	+1.1
Turnout		19,207	74.4	−13.1
Labor hold		Swing	N/A	

1943 Victorian state election: Clifton Hill
Party	Candidate	Votes	%	±%
Labor	Bert Cremean	11,413	53.0	−13.0
Independent	Allan Matthews	6,039	28.0	+28.0
Communist	Ken Miller	4,078	18.9	+18.9
Total formal votes		21,530	96.3	−1.9
Informal votes		834	3.7	+1.9
Turnout		22,364	87.5	−5.4
Labor hold		Swing	N/A	

- Preferences were not distributed.

1940 Victorian state election: Clifton Hill
Party	Candidate	Votes	%	±%
Labor	Bert Cremean	14,533	66.0	−1.8
United Australia	Reginald Archer	7,489	34.0	+1.8
Total formal votes		22,022	98.2	−0.3
Informal votes		406	1.8	+0.3
Turnout		22,428	92.9	−0.1
Labor hold		Swing	−1.8	

=== Elections in the 1930s ===
1937 Victorian state election: Clifton Hill
Party	Candidate	Votes	%	±%
Labor	Bert Cremean	15,113	67.8	+6.3
United Australia	Rhys Davies	7,167	32.2	−6.3
Total formal votes		22,280	98.5	+0.2
Informal votes		340	1.5	−0.2
Turnout		22,620	93.0	−1.4
Labor hold		Swing	+6.3	

1935 Victorian state election: Clifton Hill
Party	Candidate	Votes	%	±%
Labor	Bert Cremean	13,636	61.5	+13.1
United Australia	Harold Holt	8,531	38.5	+0.7
Total formal votes		22,167	98.3	+0.2
Informal votes		379	1.7	−0.2
Turnout		22,546	94.4	+1.9
Labor hold		Swing	+7.7	

1934 Clifton Hill state by-election
Party	Candidate	Votes	%	±%
Labor	Bert Cremean	unopposed		
Labor hold		Swing		

1932 Victorian state election: Clifton Hill
Party	Candidate	Votes	%	±%
Labor	Maurice Blackburn	10,274	48.4	−51.6
United Australia	Albert Oldus	8,029	37.8	+37.8
Premiers' Plan Labor	William Angus	2,932	13.8	+13.8
Total formal votes		21,235	98.1	
Informal votes		414	1.9	
Turnout		21,649	92.5	
Two-party-preferred result
Labor	Maurice Blackburn	11,430	53.8	−46.2
United Australia	Albert Oldus	9,805	46.2	+46.2
Labor hold		Swing	N/A	

=== Elections in the 1920s ===
1929 Victorian state election: Clifton Hill
Party	Candidate	Votes	%	±%
Labor	Maurice Blackburn	unopposed		
Labor hold		Swing		

1927 Victorian state election: Clifton Hill
Party	Candidate	Votes	%	±%
Labor	Maurice Blackburn	13,784	67.7	
Nationalist	Charles Miller	6,577	32.3	
Total formal votes		20,361	96.4	
Informal votes		763	3.6	
Turnout		21,124	86.8	
Labor hold		Swing		
