= Frank Groves =

Australian politician

Frank Groves (25 March 1873 – 3 June 1959) was an Australian politician.

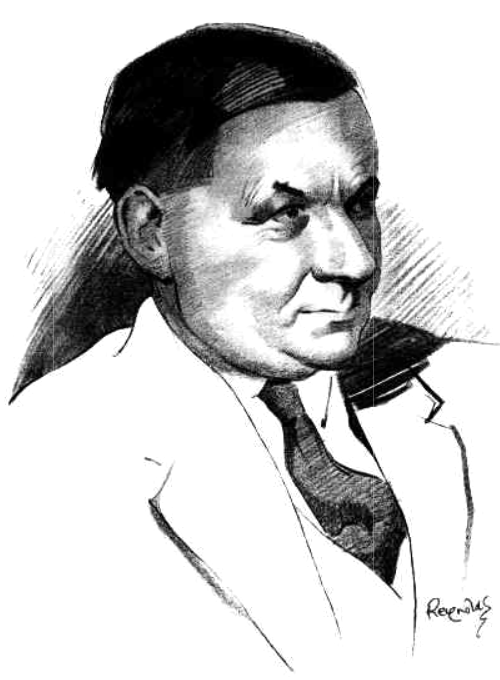
1929 portrait by Reynolds

Groves was born in Melbourne to brass moulder Edward Groves and Hannah Box. He attended state schools before becoming a Collingwood-based plumber. After the 1890s financial crash he was an itinerant worker in rural areas, before returning to Melbourne and plumbing, now based in Cheltenham. In 1901 he married Barbara Hettie Watkins, with whom he had five children. From 1910 to 1920 he served on Dandenong Shire Council (president 1911–12) and from 1920 to 1924 on Carrum Borough Council; he was first mayor of the latter from 1920 to 1921.

In 1917 Groves was elected to the Victorian Legislative Assembly as the Nationalist member for Dandenong. He was a minister without portfolio from March to July 1924, and Minister of Railways, Electrical Undertakings and Labour from 1928 to 1929. In 1929 he lost his seat, but he regained it for the United Australia Party in 1932. He remained in parliament until his second defeat in 1937. Groves died in Mordialloc in 1959.

Victorian Legislative Assembly
Preceded by William Keast	Member for Dandenong; 1917–1929	Succeeded by Bert Cremean
Preceded by Bert Cremean	Member for Dandenong; 1932–1937	Succeeded by Frank Field
