= Max Oldmeadow =

Australian politician

Max Oldmeadow OAM
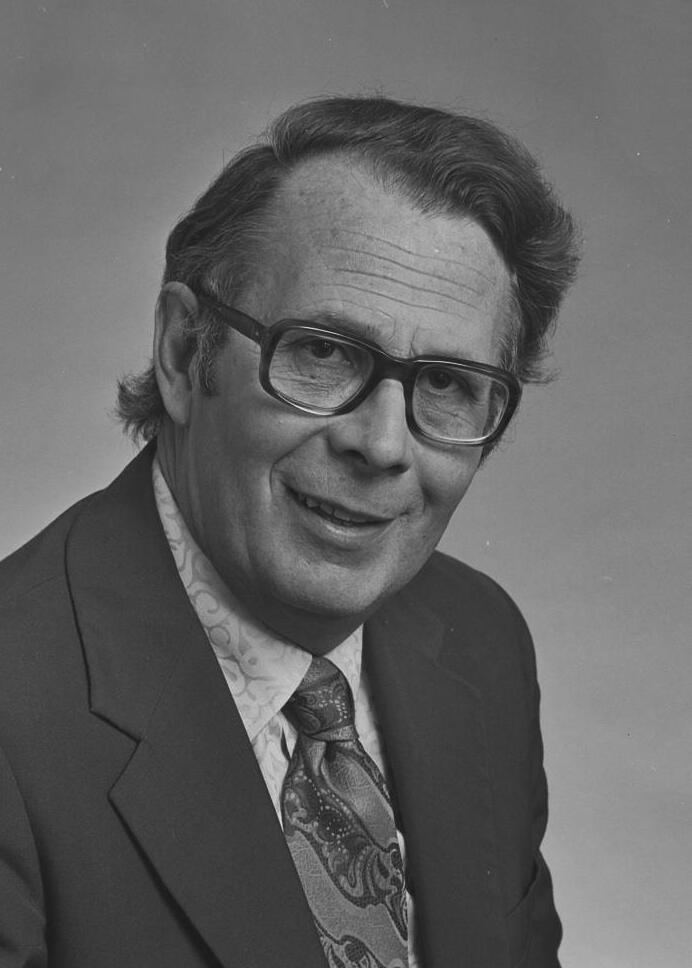
- Oldmeadow in 1974

Member of the Australian Parliament for Division of Holt
- In office 2 December 1972 – 13 December 1975
- Preceded by: Len Reid
- Succeeded by: William Yates

Personal details
- Born: 3 August 1924 Dandenong, Victoria, Australia
- Died: 21 March 2013 (aged 88) Noble Park, Victoria, Australia
- Party: Labor
- Spouse: Pam Saunders (m. 1948)
- Occupation: Teacher

Maxwell Wilkinson Oldmeadow OAM (3 August 1924 – 21 March 2013) was an Australian politician. He was a member of the Australian Labor Party (ALP) and sat in the House of Representatives from 1972 to 1975, representing the Victorian seat of Holt. He was a schoolteacher before entering parliament and a member of the Dandenong City Council from 1970 to 1973.

== Early life ==
Oldmeadow was born on 3 August 1924 in Dandenong, Victoria. He was the son of Henry and Blanche Oldmeadow. His father was born in Tonga to Methodist missionaries, and later ran a hay and grain store in Dandenong.

Oldmeadow attended primary school in Dandenong West and completed his secondary schooling at Dandenong High School and Wesley College, Melbourne. He later completed a Bachelor of Arts and diploma in education at the University of Melbourne and then qualified as a primary school teacher through Melbourne Teachers' College. At the time of his election to parliament he was vice-principal of Pakenham High School.

== Politics ==
Oldmeadow joined the ALP in 1968. He became president of the party's Dandenong branch and was a member of the Dandenong City Council from 1970 to 1973. He was elected to the House of Representatives at the 1972 federal election, defeating the incumbent Liberal MP Len Reid in the seat of Holt.

In parliament, Oldmeadow served on the House Standing Committee on Publications, the Joint Standing Committee on Foreign Affairs and Defence and the House Select Committee on Specific Learning Difficulties. He was re-elected at the 1974 election, but lost his seat to Liberal candidate William Yates in the landslide defeat of the Whitlam government at the 1975 election.

== Later activities ==
Oldmeadow returned to teaching after leaving parliament, including as principal of Chandler High School from 1977 to 1982. He was the co-author of The Human Adventure, a school textbook selling over 200,000 copies which told "the story of human civilisation from the beginning of time to the Middle Ages".

Oldmeadow was on the council of Monash University from 1978 to 1984, representing the education faculty. He was a member of the Victorian Teaching Service Conciliation and Arbitration Commission from 1982 to 1985 and was made a life member of the Australian College of Educators in 2003.

== Personal life ==
Oldmeadow married Pam Saunders in 1948. They had three sons. He was a lay preacher for over 50 years in the Methodist Church and its successor, the Uniting Church.

Oldmeadow died in Noble Park, Victoria, on 21 March 2013, aged 88.

Parliament of Australia
Preceded by Len Reid	Member for Holt; 1972–1975	Succeeded by William Yates
