= Ray Wiltshire =

Australian politician

Raymond John Wiltshire (12 July 1913 – 22 July 1990) was an Australian politician.

Wiltshire was born in Macedon to farmer David Bowen Wiltshire and Miriam Andrews. He was a mechanical engineer, and served in the Royal Australian Air Force from 1940 to 1945 as a fitter. On 26 April 1941, he married Doris Lorraine Hore, and they had two children. On his return from war service, Wiltshire ran a garage until 1949, when he became a real estate agent at Dandenong.

In 1955, he was elected to the Victorian Legislative Assembly as the Liberal and Country Party member for Dandenong. He transferred to Mulgrave in 1958 and to Syndal in 1967. Wiltshire retired from politics in 1976 and died in 1990.

Victorian Legislative Assembly
Preceded by Les Coates	Member for Dandenong; 1955–1958	Succeeded by Len Reid
New seat	Member for Mulgrave; 1958–1967	Abolished
New seat	Member for Syndal; 1967–1976	Succeeded by Geoff Coleman
