= Albert Allnutt =

Australian politician (1892–1963)

Albert George Allnutt (29 April 1892 – 18 March 1963) was an Australian politician.

Allnutt was born in Cheltenham, Melbourne, to market gardener George Thomas Allnutt and Josephine Cameron. He attended state schools at Cheltenham and Moorabbin, and worked for his father before becoming a farmer at Carwarp around 1920. On 11 February 1922, he married Robina Elizabeth Marchbank, with whom he had a son; a second marriage to Wilhelmina Redenbach on 29 September 1929 produced a daughter. In 1927, he was elected to the Victorian Legislative Assembly as the Country Progressive member for Mildura. From 1930, he was a member of the reunited Country Party. He was government whip from 1936 to 1937, but from 1939 was an outspoken critic of Albert Dunstan's leadership. In 1945, he supported a no-confidence motion against Dunstan's government and was expelled from the Country Party. He stood as an independent ministerialist in 1945 but was defeated. Allnutt died at Kerang in 1963.

Victorian Legislative Assembly
New seat	Member for Mildura; 1927–1945	Succeeded by Louis Garlick
