= William Dawnay-Mould =

Australian politician (1901–1985)

The Honourable William Dawnay-Mould

Member of the Victorian Legislative Assembly for Dandenong
- In office 8 November 1947 – 5 December 1952
- Preceded by: Frank Field
- Succeeded by: Les Coates

Personal details
- Born: William Roy Dawnay-Mould; 2 November 1901 Hither Green, England
- Died: 5 March 1985 (aged 83) Brisbane, Queensland, Australia
- Citizenship: Australian
- Party: Liberal Party; Liberal and Country Party
- Other party: Victorian Liberal Party
- Spouse: Constance Stevens (m. 1925)
- Children: Two daughters
- Education: St Dunstan's College
- Occupation: Real estate agent

William Roy Dawnay-Mould (2 November 1901 – 5 March 1985) was an English-born Australian politician.

Dawnay-Mould was born in Hither Green, Kent, and was educated privately and at St Dunstan's College. Whilst in England, he was a member of the Conservative Party.

In 1921, he emigrated to Melbourne and became a real estate agent and auctioneer. From 1946 to 1948, he served as a councillor on Sandringham City Council.

At the 8 November 1947 Victorian state election, he was elected to the Victorian Legislative Assembly, representing the Liberal Party, which became the Liberal and Country Party in 1949. In 1952, Dawnay-Mould supported former LCP leader Thomas Hollway, and was Minister for Health, Minister of Mines and Minister-in-Charge of Housing and Materials in the "seventy-hour ministry" formed by Hollway in October 1952. The Governor of Victoria dismissed Hollway's government and called an election at which Dawnay-Mould was defeated.

Dawnay-Mould unsuccessfully contested the Malvern by-election in August 1953, and was expelled from the Liberal and Country Party for contesting the by-election as a Hollway Liberal.

Victorian Legislative Assembly
Preceded by Frank Field	Member for Dandenong; 1950–1952	Succeeded by Les Coates
