= Russell Savage =

Australian politician

Member of the Victorian Legislative Assembly for Mildura
- In office 30 March 1996 – 24 November 2006

Personal details
- Born: 27 January 1948 (age 78) Melbourne
- Party: Independent
- Profession: Police officer

Russell Irwin Savage (born 27 January 1948) is an Australian politician, who was the independent member for the Victorian Legislative Assembly seat of Mildura from 1996 until 2006. Prior to entering politics, he was a long-serving police officer in Victoria and England.

== Early life and police career ==
Savage was born in 1948 in Melbourne, and educated at the Red Hill Consolidated School on the Mornington Peninsula. From 1967 to 1969, he was a police officer with the Metropolitan Police in London. He returned to Australia and joined Victoria Police in 1970, attaining the rank of senior sergeant and acting as station commander at Mildura police station. In 1989 he received the National Medal for twenty years of service in the Victorian police force.

== Political career ==
After leaving the police force in 1990, Savage entered local politics as a councillor for the Shire of Mildura council, until 1995 when the Shire was merged with the City of Mildura and Shire of Walpeup into the Rural City of Mildura.

Savage ran as an independent candidate for the seat of Mildura in the 1996 Victorian state election. Savage based his campaign on the neglect of rural Victoria by incumbent Premier Jeff Kennett's government, in particular its closure of The Vinelander rail service between Melbourne and Mildura. Savage was elected after picking up a large swing from the incumbent Liberal member Craig Bildstien, even as the Liberal state government was easily reelected. It was only the third time since the seat's creation in 1927 that it had been out of the hands of a conservative party.

At the next Victorian election in 1999, Savage retained his seat, and along with two other independents (Craig Ingram and Susan Davies), held the balance of power in the Victorian parliament (pending the results of a supplementary election in Frankston East following the death of sitting MP Peter McLellan on election day). At 11am on 18 October, Savage, Ingram and Davies held simultaneous press conferences, announcing their support for the Labor Party led by Steve Bracks.

Savage lost his seat to the National Party's Peter Crisp in the 2006 Victorian State election, a loss he attributed to the Nationals' high-budget campaign, Labor's failure to reopen the Mildura rail link, and a proposal to build a toxic waste dump in his electorate.

After leaving his seat, Savage kept a low profile, saying "There's nothing more dull than ex-members of parliament. Once you're out, you're out." He and his wife Gaie now live at their property in Queensland's Noosa hinterland.

Victorian Legislative Assembly
Preceded by Craig Bildstien	Member for Mildura; 1996–2006	Succeeded by Peter Crisp
