= Peter Crisp =

Australian politician

Peter Crisp MP

Member of the Victorian Legislative Assembly for Mildura
- In office 25 November 2006 – 24 November 2018
- Preceded by: Russell Savage
- Succeeded by: Ali Cupper

Personal details
- Born: 22 May 1954 (age 72) Mildura, Victoria
- Party: National Party
- Profession: Engineer
- Website: petercrisp.net.au

Peter Laurence Crisp (born 22 May 1954) is an Australian politician. He was a member of the Victorian Legislative Assembly from 2006 to 2018, representing Mildura. He was formerly a Wentworth Shire Councillor.

== Early life ==
Crisp holds an engineering degree from Ballarat University and was a horticulturist and milk distributor before entering politics. He also served as the Chairman of the Sunraysia Citrus Growers, and was on the board of the Australian Citrus Growers.

== Political career ==
Crisp came to prominence as the chairman of the Save the Food Bowl Alliance, a community group opposed to the plans of the Bracks government to build a toxic waste dump at Nowingi, in north-west Victoria. He resigned his position as chairman after winning National Party pre-selection for the local electorate of Mildura, contesting the seat against the Independent Russell Savage.

Savage had held Mildura since 1996, and had polled more than 50% of the primary vote in the 2002 election. Crisp was able to out-poll Savage 40% to 33% on primary vote and won the seat on preferences, a 25-point swing against the incumbent.

In January 2007, the government abandoned plans to build the Nowingi waste dump after an Environmental Effects Statement recommended against the proposal, as well as acknowledging overwhelming community opposition.

Crisp was the Nationals spokesperson for Public Transport and Major Projects from 2006 until February 2008 after the National Party and the Liberal Party entered into a coalition.

At the 2018 Victorian state election, Crisp was defeated by independent Ali Cupper, a former deputy mayor of the Rural City of Mildura, with a swing against him of over eight percent.

== Personal life ==
Crisp is married with three children.

== Controversy ==
In early 2014, Crisp was charged with several firearms offences—including possession of a prohibited firearm and the possession of guns without a licence—after reporting the theft of three guns from his farm in New South Wales. He attended a court hearing in June 2014, and was found not guilty of three charges, with another three charges dismissed. He pleaded guilty to failing to prevent the loss or theft of a firearm, and was placed on a good behaviour bond.

Victorian Legislative Assembly
Preceded by Russell Savage	Member for Mildura; 2006–2018	Succeeded by Ali Cupper
