= Ali Cupper =

Australian politician

Ali Cupper MLA

Member of the Victorian Legislative Assembly for Mildura
- In office 24 November 2018 – 26 November 2022
- Preceded by: Peter Crisp
- Succeeded by: Jade Benham

Deputy Leader of Reason Coalition
- In office 4 December 2020 – 13 May 2021
- Preceded by: Position established

Personal details
- Party: Independent (2018–present)
- Other political affiliations: Reason Coalition (2020–2021); Labor (until 2012)
- Occupation: Solicitor; Social worker

Alison Sarah Cupper (born 20 January 1980) is an Australian politician. She was an independent member of the Victorian Legislative Assembly from 2018 until 2022, representing the seat of Mildura, having previously been a Labor candidate for the seat.

== Political career ==
She served on Mildura Rural City Council from 2013, and during that time was twice deputy mayor. She contested the seat of Mildura unsuccessfully in 2010 as the Labor candidate, and as an independent in 2014, before winning in 2018, becoming the first woman to hold the seat.

During Cupper's first year in office, she successfully lobbied the Andrews Government to return the privately operated Mildura Base Hospital to public management.

On 4 December 2020, Cupper entered into an informal coalition agreement with Fiona Patten, leader of the Reason Party. The coalition agreement notionally granted Reason a second representative in the Victorian Parliament, with Cupper being appointed Deputy Leader while retaining her status as an independent member of the Legislative Assembly. Cupper ended the agreement on 13 May 2021.

In November 2024, Cupper was re-elected to Mildura Rural City Council and elected Deputy Mayor.

== Personal life ==
Prior to her entry to the state Parliament, Cupper worked as a social worker and solicitor.

Cupper is married and has one child.

Parliament of Victoria
Preceded by Peter Crisp	Member for Mildura; 2018–2022	Succeeded by Jade Benham
