= Jade Benham =

Australian politician

Member of the Victorian Legislative Assembly for Mildura
- Incumbent
- Assumed office 26 November 2022
- Preceded by: Ali Cupper

Personal details
- Political party: National
- Website: Official website

Jade Benham is an Australian politician who is the current member for the district of Mildura in the Victorian Legislative Assembly. She is a member of the Nationals and was elected in the 2022 state election, after defeating incumbent MLA Ali Cupper.

Benham was born in Swan Hill and completed her secondary education at Swan Hill Secondary College.

She was elected mayor of Swan Hill Rural City Council in November 2021 and took leave of absence from that position in July 2022 to stand in the Victorian state election.

== Personal life ==
According to Jade's parliamentary register of interests, she is a landlord and owns a rental property in Swan Hill.
