= Craig Bildstien =

Australian journalist and politician

Member of the Victorian Parliament for Mildura
- In office 1 October 1988 – 30 March 1996
- Preceded by: Milton Whiting
- Succeeded by: Russell Savage

Personal details
- Born: 20 November 1957 (age 68) Mildura, Victoria, Australia
- Party: Liberal Party
- Occupation: Journalist

Craig Stephen Bildstien (born 20 November 1957) in an Australian journalist and former politician, who was a Liberal Party member for the Victorian Legislative Assembly seat of Mildura from 1988 to 1996.

Born in Mildura, he attended Merbein High School. Before entering politics, Bildstien worked as a journalist, joining the Sunraysia Daily in 1974, and later The Border Mail as a rural affairs writer. From 1981 to 1982, Bildstien was press secretary for the Victorian Minister for Agriculture and Rural Affairs, before returning to journalism as a political editor for The News in Adelaide. After a few years back at the Sunraysia Daily as chief sub-editor, during which time he was a councillor in the Mildura City Council, Bildstien returned to The News as the paper's chief political writer.

Bildstien nominated as a Liberal Party candidate for Mildura in the 1988 Victorian state election, and was elected on 1 October. He sat on several committees, and was Parliamentary Secretary to the Minister for Agriculture from 1992 to 1996. At the 1996 state election, he was defeated by independent candidate Russell Savage.

After leaving politics, Bildstien returned to South Australia, where he worked as a chief of staff for the Premier, John Olsen; chief of staff to Iain Evans; press secretary for the federal member for Hindmarsh, Chris Gallus; and media advisor for the Adelaide City Council. He then joined the Adelaide Advertiser in various reporting and editorial roles.

He was formerly the director of media and stakeholder relations in the Office of the Fair Work Ombudsman.

Victorian Legislative Assembly
Preceded by Milton Whiting	Member for Mildura; 1988–1996	Succeeded by Russell Savage
