= Electoral district of Doveton =

Coordinates: 37°59′S 145°15′E

Doveton Victoria—Legislative Assembly
- State: Victoria
- Created: 1985
- Abolished: 1992
- Namesake: Doveton, Victoria
- Demographic: Outer metropolitan

Electoral district of Doveton was an electoral district of the Legislative Assembly in the Australian state of Victoria.

== Members ==
Member	Party	Term
Rob Jolly	Labor	1985–1992
