= Len Reid =

Australian politician (1916–2003)

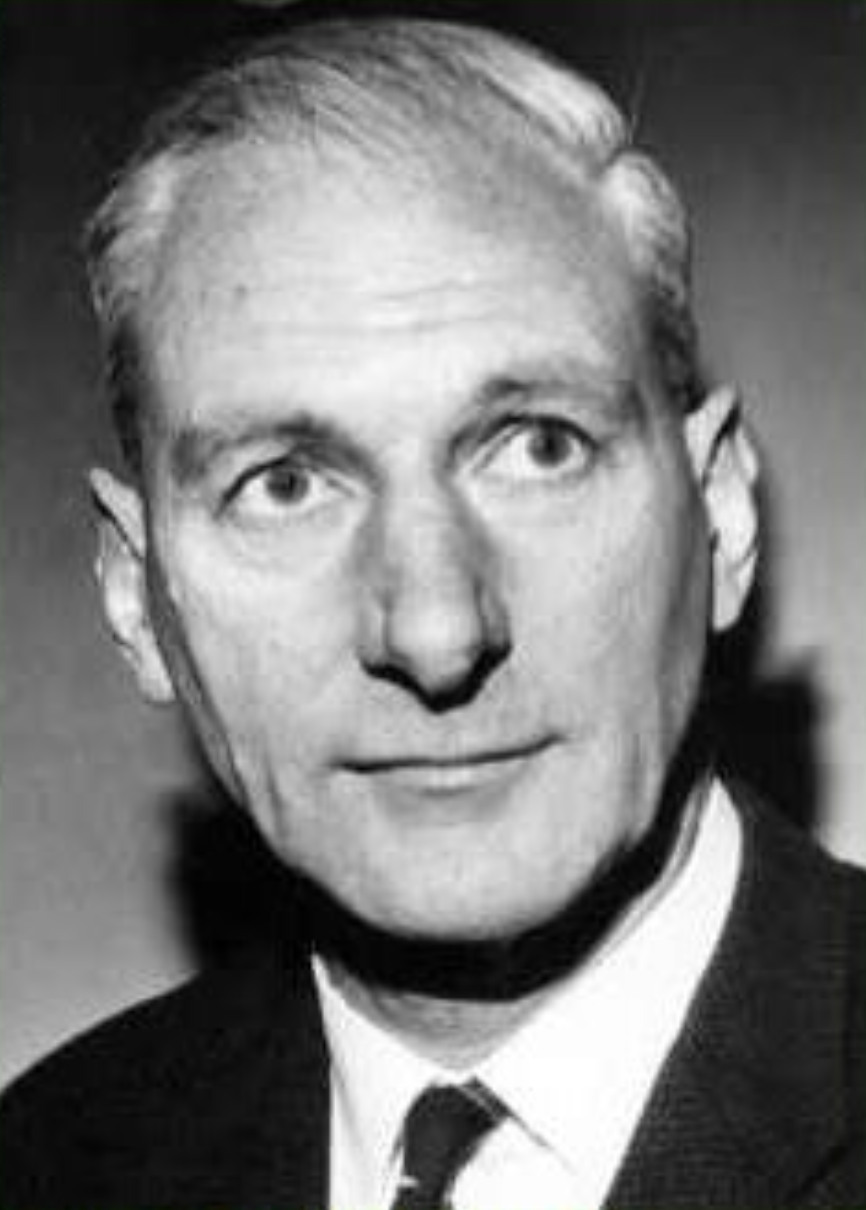

Member of the Australian Parliament for Holt
- In office 25 October 1969 – 2 December 1972
- Preceded by: New seat
- Succeeded by: Max Oldmeadow

Member of the Victorian Legislative Assembly for Dandenong
- In office 31 May 1958 – September 1969
- Preceded by: Ray Wiltshire
- Succeeded by: Alan Lind

Personal details
- Born: 21 September 1916 Clifton Hill, Victoria
- Died: 22 April 2003 (aged 86) Melbourne, Victoria
- Party: Liberal Party
- Spouse: Joan Swallow
- Children: Roger and Virginia
- Occupation: Fighter pilot, dairy farmer
- Profession: BP petroleum company

Military service
- Allegiance: Australia
- Branch/service: Royal Australian Air Force
- Years of service: 1940–1946; 1948–1954
- Rank: Flight Lieutenant
- Commands: No. 79 Squadron RAAF
- Battles/wars: Second World War; European theatre; Mediterranean and Middle East theatre; Siege of Malta; Pacific War
- Awards: Distinguished Flying Cross

Leonard Stanley Reid, DFC (21 September 1916 – 22 April 2003) was an Australian fighter pilot and politician who represented the Liberal Party as a member of the Victorian Legislative Assembly and the Australian House of Representatives.

Reid served as a fighter pilot in both the Royal Australian Air Force and on attachment to the Royal Air Force during the Second World War, and was awarded the Distinguished Flying Cross on 4 December 1942. After the war, he ran a dairy farm in Cranbourne, Victoria before being elected to the Electoral district of Dandenong at the 1958 Victorian state election. Reid served as the member for Dandenong for 11 years, before resigning his seat to contest the newly created federal Division of Holt, which covered much of the same area as Dandenong, at the 1969 federal election. Reid won narrowly, but was defeated at the 1972 federal election partly due to the swing that ousted the McMahon government and partly due to demographic changes which saw Dandenong develop as a major industrial centre.

Whilst a member of the lower house he crossed the floor and voted with the Labor Party or abstained from voting.

Reid was avidly connected with people who were marginalised in society and actively concentrated on the poor in India and Bangladesh. His publications included Crusade against Death. He was one of the founders of the charity "For Those Who Have Less", now part of "Action Aid Australia".

In 1946, Reid married Joan Averill Swallow, daughter of Leonard Swallow and Dorothy Comyn, the niece of Hugh Comyn and William Leslie Comyn. Reid and his wife had two children, Virginia and Roger.

Parliament of Australia
New division	Member for Holt; 1969–1972	Succeeded by Max Oldmeadow
Victorian Legislative Assembly
Preceded by Ray Wiltshire	Member for Dandenong; 1958–1969	Succeeded by Alan Lind
