= Electoral district of Dandenong =

State electoral district of Victoria, Australia

Coordinates: 37°59′S 145°13′E

Dandenong Victoria—Legislative Assembly
- Interactive map of electoral district boundaries from the 2022 state election
- State: Victoria
- Created: 1904
- MP: Gabrielle Williams
- Party: Labor
- Namesake: Dandenong, Victoria
- Electors: 42,361 (2018)
- Area: 58 km^{2} (22.4 sq mi)
- Demographic: Outer metropolitan

The electoral district of Dandenong is an electoral district of the Victorian Legislative Assembly. It was first proclaimed in 1904 when the district of Dandenong and Berwick was abolished.

The district is located within the outskirts of Melbourne's south-east, containing both residential and industrial areas, as well as the Armada Dandenong Plaza and Churchill National Park. A very multicultural district, it has been a safe Labor seat since the 1970s.

Dandenong District comprises the suburbs of Dandenong, Doveton, Eumemmerring and parts of Dandenong North, Dandenong South, Endeavour Hills, Noble Park, Noble Park North and Rowville.

It is part of the South-Eastern Metropolitan Region for elections to the Legislative Council.

== Members for Dandenong ==
Member	Party	Term
William Keast	Conservative	1904–1917
William Keast	Commonwealth Liberal	1904–1917
William Keast	Nationalist	1904–1917
Frank Groves	Nationalist	1917–1929
Bert Cremean	Labor	1929–1932
Frank Groves	United Australia	1932–1937
Frank Field	Labor	1937–1947
William Dawnay-Mould	Liberal	1947–1952
William Dawnay-Mould	Electoral Reform League	1947–1952
Les Coates	Labor	1952–1955
Ray Wiltshire	Liberal	1955–1958
Len Reid	Liberal	1958–1969
Alan Lind	Labor	1969–1979
Rob Jolly	Labor	1979–1985
Terry Norris	Labor	1985–1992
John Pandazopoulos	Labor	1992–2014
Gabrielle Williams	Labor	2014–present

== Election results ==
2022 Victorian state election: Dandenong
Party	Candidate	Votes	%	±%
Labor	Gabrielle Williams	21,677	54.9	−9.6
Liberal	Karen Broadley	8,475	21.5	−1.2
Greens	Matthew Kirwan	3,215	8.1	+1.1
Family First	Audrey Harmse	2,719	6.9	+6.9
Freedom	Anthony Levchenko	1,478	3.7	+3.7
Animal Justice	Andrew Klop	982	2.5	+1.6
Liberal Democrats	Tham Turner	961	2.4	+2.4
Total formal votes		39,505	92.5	+1.2
Informal votes		3,195	7.5	−1.2
Turnout		42,700	84.0	−2.3
Two-party-preferred result
Labor	Gabrielle Williams	26,970	68.3	−4.8
Liberal	Karen Broadley	12,535	31.7	+4.8
Labor hold		Swing	−4.8	

=== Graphical summary ===
Two-party-preferred vote results in Dandenong View source data.
