= Alan Lind =

Australian politician

The Honourable Alan Lind
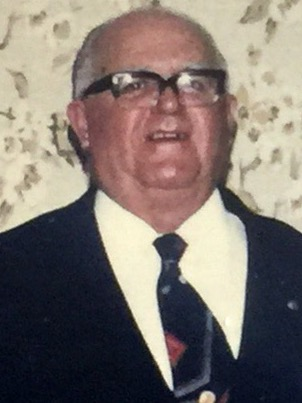

Member of the Victorian Legislative Assembly for Mildura
- In office 6 December 1952 – 28 May 1955
- Preceded by: Nathaniel Barclay
- Succeeded by: Nathaniel Barclay

Member of the Victorian Legislative Assembly for Dandenong
- In office 6 December 1969 – 5 May 1979
- Preceded by: Len Reid
- Succeeded by: Rob Jolly

Personal details
- Born: Alan Alfred Campbell Lind; 20 April 1913 Bairnsdale
- Died: 5 December 1988 (aged 75) Dandenong
- Party: Liberal Country Party; Australian Labor Party
- Spouse(s): Lilian Lind (nee McCann); Marie Lind (nee McKenzie)
- Relations: Albert Lind (uncle)
- Children: Marianne, Orme, Graeme
- Occupation: Teacher, representative of the people
- Committees: Parliamentary Public Works Committee

Alan Alfred Campbell Lind AO (20 April 1913 – 5 December 1988) was an Australian politician. His uncle was Sir Albert Eli Lind, a long-serving state MP for Gippsland East, representing the Country Party.

== Early life ==
Lind was born in Bairnsdale to baker Willie Arthur Lind and Nora Madeline Smith. He attended Bairnsdale Primary School, Bairnsdale High School and Melbourne High School. After leaving school, he graduated as a teacher from the Melbourne Teachers' College.

On 16 April 1938, at the age of 25, he married Lilian McCann (1914–1972), with whom he had three children. On 28 August 1977, he married his second wife, Marie McKenzie, née Lindemann.

== War service ==
From 1942 to 1944, Lind served for three years in the Middle East as a gunner with the second AIF 2/12th Field Regiment within the 9th Division Artillery, and later in New Guinea.

== Political career ==
Lind began his political involvement in 1939, as the secretary of the newly formed branch of the Liberal Country Party at Stratford in Gippsland. From 1945 to 1952, Lind was a teacher in the Victorian country town of Mildura on the Murray River, near the New South Wales and South Australian borders.

Sometime between 1939 and 1952 he switched his allegiance to the Australian Labor Party (ALP). At the 1952 Victorian state election, he was elected to the Victorian Legislative Assembly electorate of Mildura, as the ALP candidate. He was defeated in the state election of 1955 and returned to teaching. From 1964 to 1969, he was the principal of the primary school at Hallam.

At a 1969 by-election, he won the state seat of Dandenong, which he held until his retirement in 1979. He was chairman of the Parliamentary Public Works Committee, which involved making recommendations relating to the construction of dams, such as at Dartmouth, and the Loy Yang Power Station, extensions to tramlines, and the problem of salinity of the Murray River. He was also the shadow minister for health.

He was held in unusually high esteem by colleagues from all political parties for his unrelenting and dedicated work for his constituents and the State of Victoria. He was honoured as an Officer of the Order of Australia in 1978.

== Supported community organisations ==
- Lind was the foundation chairman of the W.J.Christie Centre for the intellectually disabled in Mildura.
- Also in Mildura, Lind worked with Carry On (Vic), an organisation which looked after the dependants of ex-servicemen and women. In 1971, he founded a branch in Dandenong and continued to serve those in need. He received the first ever Certificate of Appreciation from the organisation.
- He was the founding president of Wallara, a facility based in Keyesborough, dedicated to enhancing the quality of life for people with disabilities, and he remained its "revered president" for 25 years, visiting the centre every day.
- Lind was an active member. of Gateway Grouping, an organisation to assist the intellectually handicapped.
- He was an active participant on the council of Doveton High School.
- He was a foundation member and supportive advisor of the Dandenong Workers Club.
- Lind was a director of the Dandenong Cooperative Housing Society Ltd until his death.
- Lind was one of the original founders of the Dandenong Community Credit Union.

== Awards and tributes ==
In 1978, Lind was appointed an Officer of the Order of Australia (AO) for services to the community. In 1978, he was named Citizen of the Year by the Dandenong City Council.

On 8 December 1988, sixteen members of the Victorian Parliament from the Labor, Liberal and National parties paid significant tributes to Alan Lind. Acting Premier Bob Fordham (ALP) said:"Alan ... (was a man of) deep compassion and social commitment ... Alan was an immensely popular figure who never forgot that politics was all about looking after people". The leader of the Liberal opposition, Jeff Kennett, stated: "Alan Lind ... was a gentleman of the highest order. He was never interested in politics or life for personal gain and saw his role as a grassroots representative of people".

The treasurer, Rob Jolly, declared: "he never said a bad word about anyone, and no one ever said a bad word about Alan Lind". Tom Austin, the member for Ripon, spoke of Alan Lind's "... magnificent sense of humour". In the Dandenong Journal, editor John Woods wrote: "There have not been too many people in this world who didn't have any enemies. Allan Alfred Campbell Lind was one of them. No matter what their race, religion or political leanings, Allan Lind was a friend to all; and they to him."

Victorian Legislative Assembly
Preceded by Nathaniel Barclay	Member for Mildura; 1952–1955	Succeeded by Nathaniel Barclay
Preceded by Len Reid	Member for Dandenong; 1969–1979	Succeeded by Rob Jolly
