= Rob Jolly =

Australian politician

Robert Allen Jolly (born 27 January 1945) is a former Australian politician.

He was born in Box Hill to Athol Percival Jolly, a store manager, and Marjorie Melba. He attended local state schools and then Monash University, from which he received a Bachelor of Economics (Honours), a Diploma of Education and a Master of Economics. He joined the Labor Party in 1966. From 1968 to 1970 he was a senior teaching fellow at Monash University's economics department, and in 1971 was employed as a senior research officer with the Commonwealth Department of Labour and National Service's social policy section. He lectured in economics at Swinburne Institute of Technology in 1972, after which he worked as a research officer and industrial advocate for the Australian Council of Trade Unions. In 1979 he was elected to the Victorian Legislative Assembly as the member for Dandenong, moving to Doveton in 1985. From 1982 to 1990 he was Treasurer of Victoria. In 1992 he moved to contest the seat of Berwick, but he was defeated.

Victorian Legislative Assembly
Preceded by Alan Lind	Member for Dandenong; 1979–1985	Succeeded by Terry Norris
New seat	Member for Doveton; 1985–1992	Abolished
