= Frank Field (Australian politician) =

Australian politician

The Honourable Frank Field
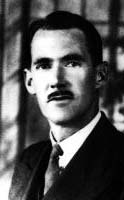

11th Deputy Premier of Victoria
- In office 21 November 1945 – 20 November 1947
- Premier: John Cain
- Preceded by: Thomas Maltby
- Succeeded by: John McDonald

Member of the Victorian Legislative Assembly for Dandenong
- In office 2 October 1937 – 9 October 1947
- Preceded by: Frank Groves
- Succeeded by: William Dawnay-Mould

Personal details
- Born: Francis Field; 23 December 1904 Carlton North, Victoria, Australia
- Died: 4 June 1985 (aged 80) Sandringham, Victoria, Australia
- Resting place: Cheltenham Memorial Park
- Party: Labor Party
- Spouse: Aileen Mary O'Brien (m. 1934–1980)
- Education: University of Melbourne
- Profession: Solicitor

Military service
- Allegiance: Australia
- Branch/service: Royal Australian Air Force
- Years of service: 1942–1947
- Rank: Flying Officer
- Unit: 1 Embarkation Depot

Francis Field (23 December 1904 – 4 June 1985) was an Australian politician.

Born in North Carlton to public servant William John Field and Kate Emily Honeybone, he attended St Mary's Primary School in Dandenong and St Kevin's College before studying at Melbourne University, from which he graduated with a Master of Arts and a Bachelor of Law. In 1930 he was admitted as a solicitor, practising in Dandenong and Melbourne. On 23 June 1934 Field married Aileen Mary O'Brien, with whom he had five children. He was elected to the Victorian Legislative Assembly in 1937 as the Labor member for Dandenong. In September 1943 he was briefly Minister of Public Instruction; after serving in the Royal Australian Air Force (1942–45) he resumed the office in November 1945, when he was also appointed Deputy Premier. He lost his seat at the 1947 election.

Victorian Legislative Assembly
Preceded by Frank Groves	Member for Dandenong; 1937–1947	Succeeded by William Dawnay-Mould
Political offices
Preceded by Albert Lind	Minister of Public Instruction; 1943	Succeeded by Thomas Hollway
Preceded by Leslie Hollins	Minister of Public Instruction; 1945–1947	Succeeded by Wilfrid Kent Hughes
Preceded by Thomas Maltby	Deputy Premier of Victoria; 1945–1947	Succeeded by John McDonald
