= William Keast (Victorian politician) =

Australian politician

William Keast (1866 – 22 February 1927) was an Australian politician and member of the Victorian Legislative Assembly for the seats of Dandenong and Berwick and Dandenong (after Dandenong and Berwick was abolished in 1904) between 1900 and 1917.

== Profile ==
Keast was born in 1866 in Strangways, Victoria. He died on 22 February 1927 in Malvern and was buried in Burwood cemetery. Parents: Stephen Heywood, farmer, and Mary Tynan. Marriage: 3 Apr 1890 with Henrietta Victoria Theodora Brackewagen. Occupation: Produce merchant and stock and station agent. Religion: Catholic. Education: Newstead State School.

== Career ==
Worked on father's farm; moved to Melbourne 1889; employed by wholesale produce firm, became manager; in business on own account as chaff and grain merchant 1892; expanded to stock and station agent 1899, many large land sales including Chirnside and Winter-Irving estates and Clarke family; owned station at Hay and bred sheep; president Chaff and Grain Association, Clifton Hill Australian Natives Association; campaigned for Federation.

== Party ==
Party: Ministerialist

Party Note: Minister Independent 1900–1902. Supported no-confidence motion against Bent 1908, Liberal

House	Electorate	Start *	End *
MLA	Dandenong and Berwick	November 1900	May 1904
MLA	Dandenong	June 1904	October 1917	Defeated

== Appointments ==
- Royal commission Grain Handling 1902
- Railway Locomotives 1905
- Tramway Fares 1910-1911
- Marketing and Transportation of Wheat committee 1911
- Royal commission Marketing and Transportation of Grain 1912-1913
- Housing committee 1913
- Royal commission Fruit, Vegetables and Jam 1915
- Public Accounts committee

1913-1917
