= Nathaniel Barclay =

Irish-born Australian politician

Member of the Victorian Legislative Assembly for Mildura
- In office 28 May 1955 – 11 September 1962
- Preceded by: Alan Lind
- Succeeded by: Milton Whiting
- In office 8 November 1947 – 6 December 1952
- Preceded by: Louis Garlick
- Succeeded by: Alan Lind

Personal details
- Born: 1 October 1895 Killeavy, Ireland
- Died: 11 September 1962 (aged 66) East Melbourne, Australia
- Party: Country Party

Military service
- Allegiance: Australia
- Branch/service: Australian Army
- Years of service: 1914–1919; 1940–1942
- Rank: Sergeant
- Battles/wars: First World War; Second World War
- Awards: Distinguished Conduct Medal

Nathaniel Barclay DCM (1 October 1895 – 11 September 1962) was an Irish-born Australian politician.

Barclay was born in Killeavy in County Armagh to farmer Jonathan Barclay and Alice née Turner. He migrated to Victoria around 1914, and served in the Australian Imperial Force during the First World War, seeing action at Gallipoli and in France, where he was awarded the Distinguished Conduct Medal in 1917. On his return he was a soldier settler at Red Cliffs, where he grew dried fruit. On 6 December 1924 he married Daisy Florence Heritage. He returned to the armed forces during the Second World War, and before and after that conflict was president of the local Returned and Services League.

In 1947 he was elected to the Victorian Legislative Assembly as the Country Party member for Mildura. He was defeated in 1952, and served on Mildura Shire Council from 1953 to 1962, with a period as president from 1958 to 1959. He returned to the Legislative Assembly in 1955 and served until his death at East Melbourne in 1962.

Victorian Legislative Assembly
| Preceded by Louis Garlick | Member for Mildura; 1947–1952 | Succeeded by Alan Lind |
| Preceded by Alan Lind | Member for Mildura; 1955–1962 | Succeeded by Milton Whiting |
