= Milton Whiting =

Australian politician (1922–2010)

Milton Whiting OAM
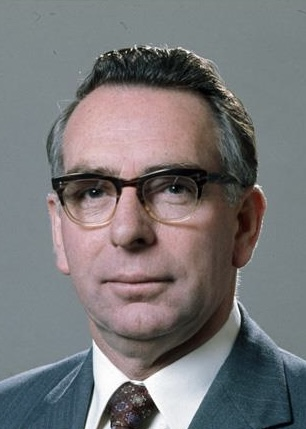

Member of the Victorian Legislative Assembly for Mildura
- In office 27 October 1962 – 29 August 1988
- Preceded by: Nathaniel Barclay
- Succeeded by: Craig Bildstien

Personal details
- Born: Milton Stanley Whiting; 11 March 1922 Merbein, Victoria
- Died: 5 July 2010 (aged 88) Mildura, Victoria
- Party: Nationals
- Spouse: Veda Rose Spiller (m. 1948)
- Occupation: Farmer

Milton Stanley Whiting OAM (11 March 1922 – 5 July 2010) was an Australian politician.

He was born in Merbein to horticulturist Stanley Joshua Whiting and Isobel Maude Venville. He attended Mildura High School and worked on his father's property from 1937 to 1941, when he enlisted in the Royal Australian Air Force. He was a wireless operator and air gunner before being captured, spending 1942 to 1945 as a prisoner of war in Germany. On his return he was part of the soldier settlement scheme and became a farmer of citrus and dried fruit at Robinvale in 1947. On 22 May 1948 he married Veda Rose Spiller, with whom he had three daughters and one son. In 1950, he was the founding secretary of the Robinvale branch of the Country Party.

Whiting was elected to the Victorian Legislative Assembly in 1962 as the member for Mildura, serving until 1988 and serving as deputy Victorian Nationals leader to Peter Ross-Edwards from 1970 to 1982.

Victorian Legislative Assembly
Preceded by Nathaniel Barclay	Member for Mildura; 1962–1988	Succeeded by Craig Bildstien
