= Bert Cremean =

Australian politician

The Honourable Bert Cremean
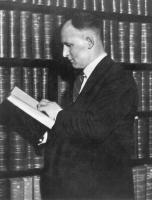

8th Deputy Premier of Victoria
- In office 14 September 1943 – 18 September 1943
- Premier: John Cain
- Preceded by: Albert Lind
- Succeeded by: Thomas Hollway

Member of the Victorian Legislative Assembly for Dandenong
- In office 30 November 1929 – 22 April 1932
- Preceded by: Frank Groves
- Succeeded by: Frank Groves

Member of the Victorian Legislative Assembly for Clifton Hill
- In office 20 August 1934 – 24 May 1945
- Preceded by: Maurice Blackburn
- Succeeded by: Jack Cremean

Personal details
- Born: Herbert Michael Cremean; 8 May 1900 Richmond, Victoria
- Died: 24 May 1945 (aged 45) Fitzroy, Victoria, Australia
- Party: Labor Party
- Spouse: Alice Mosley (m. 1924; died 1945)
- Relations: Jack Cremean (brother)
- Occupation: Clerk, timberworker, machinist, tram driver

Herbert Michael "Bert" Cremean (8 May 1900 – 24 May 1945) was an Australian politician. He was a Labor Party member of the Victorian Legislative Assembly for the districts of Dandenong (1929–1932) and Clifton Hill (1934–1945). He was Deputy Premier of Victoria for four days in September 1943.

== Early life ==
In May 1900, Cremean was born in Richmond, an inner suburb of Melbourne. His parents were Cecelia Hannah O'Connell and carpenter Timothy Carton Cremean. He was educated at St Ignatius' School in Richmond and St Patrick's College in East Melbourne, and had a broad range of occupations, including clerk, timberworker, machinist and tram driver.

== Political career ==
The Cremean family were active in local Labor politics, with both his mother and uncle having served as mayor of the City of Richmond. Cremean joined Richmond Council in 1926, and was mayor from 1928 to 1929, during a time in which the council was split by factional rivalries. In 1929, Cremean sought preselection for the Victorian lower house seat of Richmond, but was defeated by Ted Cotter in controversial circumstances. Cremean then sought and won preselection for the seat of Dandenong, and defeated the incumbent Nationalist Party member and railways minister, Frank Groves at the 1929 state election. Cremean represented Dandenong for one term, until Groves regained the seat for the United Australia Party at the election in 1932. Following his defeat, Cremean worked as an assistant purchasing officer for the Vacuum Oil Company.

In 1934, Cremean was preselected for the by-election for the seat of Clifton Hill, which was vacated by Maurice Blackburn, who had resigned to contest the federal seat of Bourke. As the only candidate at the close of nominations, Cremean was elected unopposed.

In 1941, Cremean was instrumental in the founding of "The Movement"—a consolidation of Catholic trade union groups to combat communist influence in the labour movement. Although he did not live to see the Australian Labor Party split of 1955 which resulted, Cremean was the person who suggested the formation of the group, and worked closely with B. A. Santamaria to organise it. In December 1942, Cremean authored and published a booklet, Red Glows the Dawn: A History of the Australian Communist Party, under the pseudonym Michael Lamb, warning of communist tactics and infiltration of the Labor Party.

In 1943, Cremean was appointed Deputy Premier and Chief Secretary in the First Cain Ministry, which lasted less than four days before having its commission withdrawn after the Governor refused the request of the Premier John Cain to dissolve parliament.

== Death ==
In 1945, Cremean underwent surgery for a long-standing colonic fistula at Mount St Evin's Hospital in Fitzroy, but he contracted peritonitis and died on 24 May.

Cremean's death triggered a by-election for Clifton Hill, at which his brother, Jack Cremean, was elected.

Victorian Legislative Assembly
Preceded by Frank Groves	Member for Dandenong; 1929–1932	Succeeded by Frank Groves
Preceded by Maurice Blackburn	Member for Clifton Hill; 1934–1945	Succeeded by Jack Cremean
Political offices
Preceded by Albert Lind	Deputy Premier of Victoria; 1943	Succeeded by Thomas Hollway
