= Electoral district of Mildura =

State electoral district of Victoria, Australia

Mildura Victoria—Legislative Assembly
- Interactive map of electoral district boundaries from the 2022 state election
- State: Victoria
- Created: 1927
- MP: Jade Benham
- Party: National
- Namesake: Town of Mildura
- Electors: 44,401 (2018)
- Area: 37,529 km^{2} (14,490.0 sq mi)
- Demographic: Rural
Electorates around Mildura:
| South Australia | New South Wales | New South Wales |
| South Australia | Mildura | Murray Plains |
| South Australia | Lowan | Ripon |

Mildura is an electoral district of the Legislative Assembly in the Australian state of Victoria and sits within the Northern Victoria Region. It is a 37,529 km^{2} rural electorate in the far-north-west of the state, encompassing the regional towns of Hopetoun, Mildura, Ouyen, Red Cliffs and Robinvale.

Mildura was first proclaimed in 1927 and was, for most of its history, a safe seat for the rural conservative Country Party, excluding two terms of Labor control from 1945 to 1947 and 1952–1955. In 1988, however, it became one of a number of rural seats to fall to the Liberal Party, with journalist Craig Bildstien winning the seat on Labor preferences. Bildstien held the seat for eight years before a surprise loss in 1996 to conservative independent Russell Savage. Savage was twice re-elected with large margins, but was a widely unexpected casualty of the 2006 election, losing his seat to the National Party's Peter Crisp in a landslide.

Crisp retained the seat in 2010 and 2014, only to be swept out in a shock defeat by Cupper, only the fourth time that the seat has not been held by a conservative party.

Towns within the district include: Birchip, Boundary Bend, Hopetoun, Irymple, Manangatang, Merbein, Mildura, Murrayville, Ouyen, Patchewollock, Piangil, Red Cliffs, Robinvale, Sea Lake, Walpeup, Woomelang and Wycheproof.

== Members for Mildura ==
| Member | Party | Term |
|---|---|---|
| Albert Allnutt | Country Progressive | 1927–1930 |
| Albert Allnutt | Country | 1930–1945 |
| Albert Allnutt | Independent | 1945 |
| Louis Garlick | Labor | 1945–1947 |
| Nathaniel Barclay | Country | 1947–1952 |
| Alan Lind | Labor | 1952–1955 |
| Nathaniel Barclay | Country | 1955–1962 |
| Milton Whiting | Country | 1962–1975 |
| Milton Whiting | National Country | 1975–1982 |
| Milton Whiting | National | 1982–1988 |
| Craig Bildstien | Liberal | 1988–1996 |
| Russell Savage | Independent | 1996–2006 |
| Peter Crisp | National | 2006–2018 |
| Ali Cupper | Independent | 2018–2022 |
| Jade Benham | National | 2022–present |

== Election results ==
2022 Victorian state election: Mildura
| Party | Candidate | Votes | % | ±% |
|---|---|---|---|---|
| Independent | Ali Cupper | 12,913 | 33.9 | +2.9 |
| National | Jade Benham | 9,868 | 25.9 | −11.4 |
| Liberal | Paul Matheson | 7,291 | 19.1 | +16.1 |
| Labor | Stella Zigouras | 2,483 | 6.5 | −11.1 |
| Independent | Glenn Milne | 1,716 | 4.5 | +4.5 |
| Ind. (Australia One) | Sonia Brymer | 1,080 | 2.8 | +2.8 |
| Greens | Katie Clements | 894 | 2.3 | −1.4 |
| Democratic Labour | Felicity Sharpe | 586 | 1.5 | +1.4 |
| Family First | Brad Stratton | 560 | 1.5 | +1.5 |
| Freedom | Philippe John Brougham | 416 | 1.1 | +1.1 |
| Animal Justice | Angylina Zayn | 333 | 0.9 | +0.8 |
| Total formal votes | | 38,140 | 92.5 | −2.3 |
| Informal votes | | 3,096 | 7.5 | +2.3 |
| Turnout | | 41,236 | 86.0 | −1.9 |
Notional two-party-preferred count
| National | Jade Benham | 24,454 | 64.1 | +8.0 |
| Labor | Stella Zigouras | 13,686 | 35.9 | −8.0 |
Two-candidate-preferred result
| National | Jade Benham | 19,520 | 51.2 | +0.9 |
| Independent | Ali Cupper | 18,620 | 48.8 | −0.9 |
| National gain from Independent | | Swing | +0.9 | |
