= Les Coates =

Australian politician

Leslie Robert Coates (9 June 1898 – 20 February 1976) was an Australian politician.

Born in Brighton to market gardener Robert Brooke Coates and Jane Annie Boxshall, he attended Moorabbin State School and became a cigar maker. Around 1924 he married Hilda Grace Hedberg, with whom he had two children. He served on Moorabbin City Council from 1947 to 1974, including four periods as mayor (1949–50, 1953–54, 1961–62 and 1969–70). He was a delegate to the Trades Hall Council and in 1952 was elected to the Victorian Legislative Assembly as the Labor member for Dandenong, serving until 1955, when he unsuccessfully attempted to transfer to Moorabbin. He contested the federal seat of Higinbotham in 1955 and Moorabbin in 1958 and 1961, but was not able to re-enter parliament. After losing preselection for Moorabbin in 1964 he left the Labor Party, rejoining in 1972. Coates died in 1976 at Moorabbin and was buried at Cheltenham.
