= Louis Garlick =

Australian politician

Louis Frederick Cornu Garlick (16 September 1910 – 13 December 2002) was an Australian politician.

He was born in Mornington to storekeeper Robert Costain Garlick and Caroline Laura Cornu. He attended Dandenong High School and the University of Melbourne, where he received a Bachelor of Arts and a Bachelor of Education. He commenced work as a schoolteacher in 1927, teaching widely across rural Victoria. On 22 December 1936, he married Florence Rosa Maclean, with whom he had three children. In 1945, he was elected to the Victorian Legislative Assembly as the Labor member for Mildura. Defeated in 1947, he returned to teaching, and from 1954 to 1968 was chairman of the Victorian Teachers' Tribunal. Garlick died in Melbourne in 2002.

Victorian Legislative Assembly
Preceded by Robert Holt	Member for Mildura; 1945–1947	Succeeded by Robert Holt
