= Results of the 1929 Victorian state election (Legislative Assembly) =

Australian state election results

Victorian state election, 30 November 1929 Legislative Assembly << 1927–1932 >>
Enrolled voters	682,190				
Votes cast	639,368		Turnout	93.72	+1.96
Informal votes	6,830		Informal	1.07	−0.87
Summary of votes by party
Party	Primary votes	%	Swing	Seats	Change
Labor	247,251	39.09	−2.70	30	+2
Nationalist	242,009	38.26	+7.37	17	±0
Country	55,876	8.83	+0.70	11	+1
Country Progressive	33,798	5.34	+1.18	4	±0
Communist	1,962	0.31	+0.31	0	±0
Independent	51,642	8.16	+1.98	3	−3
Total	632,538			65	

This is a list of electoral district results for the Victorian 1929 election.

== Results by electoral district ==
=== Albert Park ===
1929 Victorian state election: Albert Park
Party	Candidate	Votes	%	±%
Labor	Arthur Wallace	10,994	53.1	+6.6
Nationalist	Robert Cuthbertson	9,704	46.9	+12.8
Total formal votes		20,698	99.0	+1.5
Informal votes		203	1.0	−1.5
Turnout		20,901	91.6	+2.3
Labor gain from Nationalist		Swing	+3.2	

=== Allandale ===
1929 Victorian state election: Allandale
Party	Candidate	Votes	%	±%
Nationalist	Alexander Peacock	unopposed		
Nationalist hold		Swing		

=== Ballarat ===
1929 Victorian state election: Ballarat
Party	Candidate	Votes	%	±%
Labor	William McAdam	8,992	54.9	+1.3
Nationalist	Fred Edmunds	7,397	45.1	−1.3
Total formal votes		16,389	99.1	+0.1
Informal votes		148	0.9	−0.1
Turnout		16,537	96.9	+2.0
Labor hold		Swing	+1.3	

=== Barwon ===
1929 Victorian state election: Barwon
Party	Candidate	Votes	%	±%
Nationalist	Thomas Maltby	6,821	61.6	−2.6
Labor	John Bond	4,246	38.4	+2.6
Total formal votes		11,067	99.3	+0.7
Informal votes		78	0.7	−0.7
Turnout		11,145	96.2	+4.6
Nationalist hold		Swing	−2.6	

=== Benalla ===
1929 Victorian state election: Benalla
Party	Candidate	Votes	%	±%
Country Progressive	Edward Cleary	5,327	56.4	+17.7
Country	Patrick Connell	4,123	43.6	+18.6
Total formal votes		9,450	99.1	+1.3
Informal votes		87	0.9	−1.3
Turnout		9,537	94.5	+1.8
Country Progressive hold		Swing	N/A	

=== Benambra ===
1929 Victorian state election: Benambra
Party	Candidate	Votes	%	±%
Nationalist	Henry Beardmore	unopposed		
Nationalist hold		Swing	N/A	

=== Bendigo ===
1929 Victorian state election: Bendigo
Party	Candidate	Votes	%	±%
Labor	Arthur Cook	unopposed		
Labor hold		Swing		

=== Boroondara ===
1929 Victorian state election: Boroondara
Party	Candidate	Votes	%	±%
Nationalist	Richard Linton	13,881	60.3	+20.6
Labor	Robert Dodman	9,152	39.7	+11.2
Total formal votes		23,033	99.1	+3.0
Informal votes		204	0.9	−3.0
Turnout		23,237	93.6	+0.9
Nationalist hold		Swing	−3.1	

=== Brighton ===
1929 Victorian state election: Brighton
Party	Candidate	Votes	%	±%
Nationalist	Ian Macfarlan	10,460	46.2	−53.8
Independent	Richard Tracey	5,141	22.7	+22.7
Independent	Angela Booth	3,668	16.2	+16.2
Independent	Jeremiah Grant	3,359	14.8	+14.8
Total formal votes		22,628	97.7	
Informal votes		535	2.3	
Turnout		23,163	94.4	
After distribution of preferences
Nationalist	Ian Macfarlan	11,342	50.1	
Independent	Richard Tracey	5,750	25.4	
Independent	Angela Booth	5,536	24.5	
Nationalist hold		Swing		

- Preferences were not distributed to completion.

=== Brunswick ===
1929 Victorian state election: Brunswick
Party	Candidate	Votes	%	±%
Labor	James Jewell	unopposed		
Labor hold		Swing		

=== Bulla and Dalhousie ===
1929 Victorian state election: Bulla and Dalhousie
Party	Candidate	Votes	%	±%
Labor	Reg Pollard	4,911	54.3	+6.3
Nationalist	Francis Lobb	2,253	24.9	+4.5
Country	Claude Anderson	1,876	20.7	+2.1
Total formal votes		9,040	98.8	+0.6
Informal votes		111	1.2	−0.6
Turnout		9,151	91.9	+2.9
Two-party-preferred result
Labor	Reg Pollard		56.3	+0.2
Nationalist	Francis Lobb		43.7	−0.2
Labor hold		Swing	+0.2	

- Two party preferred vote was estimated.

=== Carlton ===
1929 Victorian state election: Carlton
Party	Candidate	Votes	%	±%
Labor	Robert Solly	unopposed		
Labor hold		Swing		

=== Castlemaine and Kyneton ===
1929 Victorian state election: Castlemaine and Kyneton
Party	Candidate	Votes	%	±%
Labor	Jessie Satchell	4,926	50.1	+10.4
Nationalist	Walter Langslow	4,897	49.9	−10.4
Total formal votes		9,823	99.6	+0.6
Informal votes		51	0.4	−0.6
Turnout		9,874	95.9	+2.2
Labor gain from Nationalist		Swing	+10.4	

=== Caulfield ===
1929 Victorian state election: Caulfield
Party	Candidate	Votes	%	±%
Australian Liberal	Frederick Forrest	11,710	51.2	+8.6
Nationalist	Oscar Mendelsohn	11,148	48.8	+18.7
Total formal votes		22,858	98.9	+2.0
Informal votes		266	1.1	−2.0
Turnout		23,124	94.0	+1.3
Australian Liberal hold		Swing	−13.8	

=== Clifton Hill ===
1929 Victorian state election: Clifton Hill
Party	Candidate	Votes	%	±%
Labor	Maurice Blackburn	unopposed		
Labor hold		Swing		

=== Coburg ===
1929 Victorian state election: Coburg
Party	Candidate	Votes	%	±%
Labor	Frank Keane	unopposed		
Labor hold		Swing		

=== Collingwood ===
1929 Victorian state election: Collingwood
Party	Candidate	Votes	%	±%
Labor	Tom Tunnecliffe	unopposed		
Labor hold		Swing		

=== Dandenong ===
1929 Victorian state election: Dandenong
Party	Candidate	Votes	%	±%
Labor	Bert Cremean	12,085	53.1	+8.3
Nationalist	Frank Groves	10,663	46.9	+5.2
Total formal votes		22,748	99.2	+2.0
Informal votes		194	0.8	−2.0
Turnout		22,942	93.0	+1.9
Labor gain from Nationalist		Swing	+4.1	

=== Dundas ===
1929 Victorian state election: Dundas
Party	Candidate	Votes	%	±%
Labor	Bill Slater	5,922	57.7	+0.8
Nationalist	William Ellis	4,340	42.3	−0.8
Total formal votes		10,262	99.2	−0.1
Informal votes		84	0.8	+0.1
Turnout		10,346	95.5	+0.4
Labor hold		Swing	+0.8	

=== Essendon ===
1929 Victorian state election: Essendon
Party	Candidate	Votes	%	±%
Labor	Arthur Drakeford	12,119	57.5	+5.1
Nationalist	Arthur Clerke	5,506	26.1	−21.5
Ind. Nationalist	Arthur Fenton	2,680	12.7	+12.7
Ind. Nationalist	Gerald Fitzgerald	775	3.7	+3.7
Total formal votes		21,080	98.3	−1.0
Informal votes		368	1.7	+1.0
Turnout		21,448	96.1	+1.3
Two-party-preferred result
Labor	Arthur Drakeford		59.1	+6.7
Nationalist	Arthur Clerke		40.9	−6.7
Labor hold		Swing	+6.7	

- Two party preferred vote was estimated.

=== Evelyn ===
1929 Victorian state election: Evelyn
Party	Candidate	Votes	%	±%
Nationalist	William Everard	5,622	60.9	+60.9
Labor	Edward Hodges	3,607	39.1	+10.3
Total formal votes		9,229	99.3	+1.9
Informal votes		65	0.7	−1.9
Turnout		9,294	93.0	+2.6
Nationalist gain from Ind. Nationalist		Swing	N/A	

=== Flemington ===
1929 Victorian state election: Flemington
Party	Candidate	Votes	%	±%
Labor	Jack Holland	unopposed		
Labor hold		Swing		

=== Footscray ===
1929 Victorian state election: Footscray
Party	Candidate	Votes	%	±%
Labor	George Prendergast	unopposed		
Labor hold		Swing		

=== Geelong ===
1929 Victorian state election: Geelong
Party	Candidate	Votes	%	±%
Labor	William Brownbill	10,667	63.4	+6.1
Nationalist	Sidney Dickins	6,159	36.6	−6.1
Total formal votes		16,826	99.1	+0.1
Informal votes		158	0.9	−0.1
Turnout		16,984	95.5	+2.3
Labor hold		Swing	+6.1	

=== Gippsland East ===
1929 Victorian state election: Gippsland East
Party	Candidate	Votes	%	±%
Country	Albert Lind	5,148	77.4	+7.3
Independent	Joseph Coate	1,502	22.6	+22.6
Total formal votes		6,650	99.4	+0.5
Informal votes		43	0.6	−0.5
Turnout		6,693	93.9	+4.9
Country hold		Swing	N/A	

=== Gippsland North ===
1929 Victorian state election: Gippsland North
Party	Candidate	Votes	%	±%
Independent	James McLachlan	unopposed		
Independent hold		Swing		

=== Gippsland South ===
1929 Victorian state election: Gippsland South
Party	Candidate	Votes	%	±%
Country	Herbert Hyland	4,175	43.1	+17.6
Nationalist	Walter West	2,900	29.9	−0.5
Labor	Morris Mulcahy	2,610	27.0	+3.3
Total formal votes		9,685	98.9	+2.2
Informal votes		106	1.1	−2.2
Turnout		9,791	92.2	0.0
Two-candidate-preferred result
Country	Herbert Hyland	5,999	61.9	+61.9
Nationalist	Walter West	3,686	39.1	−9.3
Country gain from Independent		Swing	N/A	

=== Gippsland West ===
1929 Victorian state election: Gippsland West
Party	Candidate	Votes	%	±%
Country	Matthew Bennett	3,688	37.5	+14.9
Labor	Robert Garlick	3,447	35.1	−1.9
Nationalist	Reginald James	2,698	27.4	+7.2
Total formal votes		9,833	99.0	+2.7
Informal votes		102	1.0	−2.7
Turnout		9,935	93.8	+2.3
Two-party-preferred result
Country	Matthew Bennett	6,080	61.8	+9.1
Labor	Robert Garlick	3,753	38.2	−9.1
Country hold		Swing	+9.1	

=== Goulburn Valley ===
1929 Victorian state election: Goulburn Valley
Party	Candidate	Votes	%	±%
Country	Murray Bourchier	unopposed		
Country hold		Swing		

=== Grant ===
1929 Victorian state election: Grant
Party	Candidate	Votes	%	±%
Labor	Ralph Hjorth	4,457	50.1	+2.3
Nationalist	Frederick Holden	2,624	29.5	+4.5
Country	Edwy Finch	1,816	20.4	−0.9
Total formal votes		8,897	99.1	+0.7
Informal votes		80	0.9	−0.7
Turnout		8,977	92.5	+0.7
Two-party-preferred result
Labor	Ralph Hjorth		52.0	−1.4
Nationalist	Frederick Holden		48.0	+1.4
Labor hold		Swing	−1.4	

- Two party preferred vote was estimated.

=== Gunbower ===
1929 Victorian state election: Gunbower
Party	Candidate	Votes	%	±%
Nationalist	Henry Angus	6,627	65.1	+65.1
Country Progressive	Edward McNicol	3,555	34.9	−3.7
Total formal votes		10,182	99.4	+0.6
Informal votes		58	0.6	−0.6
Turnout		10,240	92.7	+2.2
Nationalist gain from Ind. Nationalist		Swing	N/A	

=== Hampden ===
1929 Victorian state election: Hampden
Party	Candidate	Votes	%	±%
Nationalist	Chester Manifold	5,336	52.6	+6.2
Labor	Arthur Hughes	4,811	47.4	−6.2
Total formal votes		10,147	99.4	+0.4
Informal votes		65	0.6	−0.4
Turnout		10,212	95.4	+3.1
Nationalist gain from Labor		Swing	+6.2	

=== Hawthorn ===
1929 Victorian state election: Hawthorn
Party	Candidate	Votes	%	±%
Nationalist	William McPherson	10,978	53.3	−4.3
Labor	William Hulse	9,614	46.7	+4.3
Total formal votes		20,592	99.2	+0.5
Informal votes		167	0.8	−0.5
Turnout		20,759	92.9	−1.5
Nationalist hold		Swing	−4.3	

=== Heidelberg ===
1929 Victorian state election: Heidelberg
Party	Candidate	Votes	%	±%
Labor	Gordon Webber	15,391	65.7	+11.3
Nationalist	William Luke	8,031	34.3	−11.3
Total formal votes		23,422	98.9	−0.4
Informal votes		269	1.1	+0.4
Turnout		23,691	92.8	+0.7
Labor hold		Swing	+11.3	

=== Kara Kara and Borung ===
1929 Victorian state election: Kara Kara and Borung
Party	Candidate	Votes	%	±%
Nationalist	John Pennington	5,915	59.5	+14.2
Country Progressive	Alexander Dowsley	4,026	40.5	+11.2
Total formal votes		9,941	99.5	+2.1
Informal votes		56	0.5	−2.1
Turnout		9,997	91.6	+0.8
Nationalist hold		Swing	+5.1	

=== Kew ===
1929 Victorian state election: Kew
Party	Candidate	Votes	%	±%
Nationalist	Wilfrid Kent Hughes	13,551	62.0	+29.7
Labor	Cyril Murphy	6,889	31.5	+6.7
Independent	Constantine Crowley	1,399	6.4	+6.4
Total formal votes		21,839	98.6	+1.0
Informal votes		304	1.4	−1.0
Turnout		22,143	93.3	+0.2
Two-party-preferred result
Nationalist	Wilfrid Kent Hughes		65.7	+21.5
Labor	Cyril Murphy		34.3	+34.3
Nationalist gain from Ind. Nationalist		Swing	N/A	

- Two party preferred vote was estimated.

=== Korong and Eaglehawk ===
1929 Victorian state election: Korong and Eaglehawk
Party	Candidate	Votes	%	±%
Country Progressive	Albert Dunstan	5,673	56.8	+0.7
Nationalist	Alexander Taysom	4,313	43.2	+43.2
Total formal votes		9,986	99.3	+0.3
Informal votes		70	0.7	−0.3
Turnout		10,056	92.3	−0.8
Country Progressive hold		Swing	N/A	

=== Lowan ===
1929 Victorian state election: Lowan
Party	Candidate	Votes	%	±%
Country	Marcus Wettenhall	4,922	46.5	−11.2
Labor	James McDonald	3,475	32.8	+32.8
Country Progressive	Albert Bussau	2,189	20.7	−21.5
Total formal votes		10,586	98.8	+0.5
Informal votes		130	1.2	−0.5
Turnout		10,716	95.1	+4.0
Two-party-preferred result
Country	Marcus Wettenhall	6,168	58.3	+0.6
Labor	James McDonald	4,418	41.7	+41.7
Country hold		Swing	N/A	

=== Maryborough and Daylesford ===
1929 Victorian state election: Maryborough and Daylesford
Party	Candidate	Votes	%	±%
Labor	George Frost	unopposed		
Labor hold		Swing		

=== Melbourne ===
1929 Victorian state election: Melbourne
Party	Candidate	Votes	%	±%
Labor	Tom Hayes	unopposed		
Labor hold		Swing		

=== Mildura ===
1929 Victorian state election: Mildura
Party	Candidate	Votes	%	±%
Country Progressive	Albert Allnutt	3,672	39.1	+7.0
Labor	John Patterson	3,571	38.0	−2.3
Country	Albert Henshall	2,153	22.9	−4.7
Total formal votes		9,396	98.4	+0.1
Informal votes		150	1.6	−0.1
Turnout		9,546	90.0	−1.1
Two-party-preferred result
Country Progressive	Albert Allnutt	5,640	60.0	+2.5
Labor	John Patterson	3,657	40.0	−2.5
Country Progressive hold		Swing	+2.5	

=== Mornington ===
1929 Victorian state election: Mornington
Party	Candidate	Votes	%	±%
Nationalist	Alfred Kirton	4,531	43.4	+6.3
Country	Herbert Downward	2,933	28.1	−14.4
Labor	John Jack	2,587	24.8	+24.8
Independent	Joseph Burch	381	3.6	+3.6
Total formal votes		10,432	98.4	+1.0
Informal votes		168	1.6	−1.0
Turnout		10,600	91.6	+2.4
Two-candidate-preferred result
Country	Herbert Downward	5,364	51.4	−2.2
Nationalist	Alfred Kirton	5,068	48.6	+2.2
Country hold		Swing	−2.2	

=== Northcote ===
1929 Victorian state election: Northcote
Party	Candidate	Votes	%	±%
Labor	John Cain	unopposed		
Labor hold		Swing		

=== Nunawading ===
1929 Victorian state election: Nunawading
Party	Candidate	Votes	%	±%
Nationalist	Robert Menzies	10,932	55.4	−0.8
Labor	John McKellar	8,793	44.6	+10.7
Total formal votes		19,725	99.2	+1.5
Informal votes		151	0.8	−1.5
Turnout		19,876	94.5	+1.4
Nationalist hold		Swing	−3.7	

=== Oakleigh ===
1929 Victorian state election: Oakleigh
Party	Candidate	Votes	%	±%
Labor	Squire Reid	14,580	57.0	+15.2
Nationalist	Duncan Mackinnon	10,986	43.0	+5.9
Total formal votes		25,566	99.2	+1.3
Informal votes		212	0.8	−1.3
Turnout		25,778	93.9	+0.1
Labor hold		Swing	+6.7	

=== Ouyen ===
1929 Victorian state election: Ouyen
Party	Candidate	Votes	%	±%
Country Progressive	Harold Glowrey	unopposed		
Country Progressive hold		Swing		

=== Polwarth ===
1929 Victorian state election: Polwarth
Party	Candidate	Votes	%	±%
Nationalist	James McDonald	5,843	54.9	−45.1
Labor	Phillip Hill	4,800	45.1	+45.1
Total formal votes		10,643	99.8	
Informal votes		23	0.2	
Turnout		10,666	95.1	
Nationalist hold		Swing	N/A	

=== Port Fairy and Glenelg ===
1929 Victorian state election: Port Fairy and Glenelg
Party	Candidate	Votes	%	±%
Labor	Ernie Bond	6,439	61.5	+0.9
Ind. Nationalist	William Stevenson	2,735	26.1	+26.1
Nationalist	Donald Ferguson	1,291	12.3	−27.1
Total formal votes		10,465	99.0	+0.1
Informal votes		111	1.0	−0.1
Turnout		10,576	96.1	+1.9
Labor hold		Swing	N/A	

- Preferences were not distributed.

=== Port Melbourne ===
1929 Victorian state election: Port Melbourne
Party	Candidate	Votes	%	±%
Labor	James Murphy	16,648	89.5	−10.5
Communist	Thomas Le Huray	1,962	10.5	+10.5
Total formal votes		18,610	96.7	
Informal votes		637	3.3	
Turnout		19,247	90.4	
Labor hold		Swing	N/A	

=== Prahran ===
1929 Victorian state election: Prahran
Party	Candidate	Votes	%	±%
Labor	Arthur Jackson	12,516	56.7	+0.2
Nationalist	Alfred Cole	9,575	43.3	−0.2
Total formal votes		22,100	98.9	+0.2
Informal votes		254	1.1	−0.2
Turnout		22,345	92.0	+0.7
Labor hold		Swing	+0.2	

=== Richmond ===
1929 Victorian state election: Richmond
Party	Candidate	Votes	%	±%
Labor	Ted Cotter	unopposed		
Labor hold		Swing		

=== Rodney ===
1929 Victorian state election: Rodney
Party	Candidate	Votes	%	±%
Country	John Allan	6,199	58.5	−1.1
Country Progressive	Richard Doidge	4,391	41.5	+4.7
Total formal votes		10,590	99.5	+1.5
Informal votes		51	0.5	−1.5
Turnout		10,641	94.7	+2.6
Country hold		Swing	N/A	

=== St Kilda ===
1929 Victorian state election: St Kilda
Party	Candidate	Votes	%	±%
Australian Liberal	Burnett Gray	13,253	54.6	+4.2
Nationalist	Robert Morley	11,035	45.4	+16.4
Total formal votes		24,288	99.2	+2.1
Informal votes		207	0.8	−2.1
Turnout		24,495	93.6	+1.7
Australian Liberal hold		Swing	N/A	

=== Stawell and Ararat ===
1929 Victorian state election: Stawell and Ararat
Party	Candidate	Votes	%	±%
Nationalist	Richard Toutcher	5,415	52.0	−3.8
Labor	Frank Brophy	5,006	48.0	+3.8
Total formal votes		10,421	99.2	+1.3
Informal votes		84	0.8	−1.3
Turnout		10,505	94.9	+2.1
Nationalist hold		Swing	−3.8	

=== Swan Hill ===
1929 Victorian state election: Swan Hill
Party	Candidate	Votes	%	±%
Country	Francis Old	4,706	56.7	+13.2
Country Progressive	Thomas Connellan	3,590	43.3	+16.2
Total formal votes		8,296	99.2	+2.3
Informal votes		71	0.8	−2.3
Turnout		8,367	90.8	+3.7
Country hold		Swing	N/A	

=== Toorak ===
1929 Victorian state election: Toorak
Party	Candidate	Votes	%	±%
Nationalist	Stanley Argyle	12,662	63.1	+14.6
Labor	Victor Stout	7,408	36.9	+5.5
Total formal votes		171	99.2	+1.5
Informal votes		171	0.8	−1.5
Turnout		20,241	92.0	+2.1
Nationalist hold		Swing	+1.1	

=== Upper Goulburn ===
1929 Victorian state election: Upper Goulburn
Party	Candidate	Votes	%	±%
Country	Edwin Mackrell	4,555	51.2	+17.4
Labor	Edward Withers	4,337	48.8	+4.7
Total formal votes		8,892	99.4	+0.8
Informal votes		57	0.6	−0.8
Turnout		8,949	94.3	+4.1
Country hold		Swing	−0.7	

=== Upper Yarra ===
1929 Victorian state election: Upper Yarra
Party	Candidate	Votes	%	±%
Nationalist	George Knox	unopposed		
Nationalist hold		Swing		

=== Walhalla ===
1929 Victorian state election: Walhalla
Party	Candidate	Votes	%	±%
Labor	William McGrath	4,259	45.2	+6.4
Country	William Moncur	4,208	44.7	+12.7
Independent Country	Andrew Wilson	950	10.1	+10.1
Total formal votes		9,417	99.0	+1.0
Informal votes		98	1.0	−1.0
Turnout		9,515	93.2	+2.0
Two-party-preferred result
Country	William Moncur	5,024	53.4	+0.6
Labor	William McGrath	4,393	46.6	−0.6
Country hold		Swing	+0.6	

=== Wangaratta and Ovens ===
1929 Victorian state election: Wangaratta and Ovens
Party	Candidate	Votes	%	±%
Labor	Clive Walker	3,428	38.3	+38.3
Country	Lot Diffey	2,821	31.6	−30.8
Country Progressive	William Higgins	1,375	15.4	+15.4
Independent Country	Percival Inchbold	1,313	14.7	+14.7
Total formal votes		8,937	98.7	+1.9
Informal votes		114	1.3	−1.9
Turnout		9,051	95.1	+3.1
Two-party-preferred result
Country	Lot Diffey	4,869	54.5	+1.3
Labor	Clive Walker	4,068	45.5	+45.5
Country hold		Swing	N/A	

=== Waranga ===
1929 Victorian state election: Waranga
Party	Candidate	Votes	%	±%
Nationalist	Ernest Coyle	4,176	48.6	+7.6
Labor	John Minogue	2,809	32.7	−5.3
Country	William Pook	929	10.8	−9.7
Country	Edward Buckland	674	7.8	+7.8
Total formal votes		8,588	98.8	+0.7
Informal votes		102	1.2	−0.7
Turnout		8,690	94.2	+3.0
Nationalist hold		Swing	N/A	

- Preferences were not distributed.

=== Warrenheip and Grenville ===
1929 Victorian state election: Warrenheip and Grenville
Party	Candidate	Votes	%	±%
Labor	Edmond Hogan	5,609	60.0	+1.7
Nationalist	Tom Hartrey	3,739	40.0	−1.7
Total formal votes		9,348	99.2	0.0
Informal votes		73	0.8	0.0
Turnout		9,421	96.8	+1.7
Labor hold		Swing	+1.7	

=== Warrnambool ===
1929 Victorian state election: Warrnambool
Party	Candidate	Votes	%	±%
Labor	Henry Bailey	6,146	62.3	+9.2
Australian Liberal	William Downing	3,726	37.7	+32.7
Total formal votes		9,872	99.0	−0.1
Informal votes		95	1.0	+0.1
Turnout		9,967	95.4	+1.3
Labor hold		Swing	N/A	

=== Williamstown ===
1929 Victorian state election: Williamstown
Party	Candidate	Votes	%	±%
Labor	John Lemmon	unopposed		
Labor hold		Swing		

=== Wonthaggi ===
1929 Victorian state election: Wonthaggi
Party	Candidate	Votes	%	±%
Labor	William McKenzie	unopposed		
Labor hold		Swing		

== See also ==
- 1929 Victorian state election
- Candidates of the 1929 Victorian state election
- Members of the Victorian Legislative Assembly, 1929–1932
