= Results of the 1932 Victorian state election (Legislative Assembly) =

Victorian state election, 14 March 1932 Legislative Assembly << 1929–1935 >>
Enrolled voters	729,332				
Votes cast	687,042		Turnout	94.20	+0.48
Informal votes	9,676		Informal	1.41	+0.34
Summary of votes by party
Party	Primary votes	%	Swing	Seats	Change
United Australia	271,778	40.12	+1.86	31	+13
Labor	237,993	35.14	−3.95	16	−14
United Country	83,519	12.33	−1.84	14	−1
Premiers' Plan Labor	17,347	2.56	+2.56	2	+2
Communist	953	0.14	−0.17	0	±0
Independent	65,776	9.71	+1.55	2	−1
Total	677,366			65	

This is a list of electoral district results for the Victorian 1932 election.

== Results by electoral district ==
=== Albert Park ===
1932 Victorian state election: Albert Park
Party	Candidate	Votes	%	±%
United Australia	Harry Drew	12,850	64.0	+17.1
Labor	Joseph Hannan	7,215	36.0	−17.1
Total formal votes		20,065	98.3	−0.7
Informal votes		358	1.7	+0.7
Turnout		20,423	91.1	−0.5
United Australia gain from Labor		Swing	+17.1	

=== Allandale ===
1932 Victorian state election: Allandale
Party	Candidate	Votes	%	±%
United Australia	Alexander Peacock	unopposed		
United Australia hold		Swing		

=== Ballarat ===
1932 Victorian state election: Ballarat
Party	Candidate	Votes	%	±%
United Australia	Thomas Hollway	9,654	56.7	+11.6
Labor	William McAdam	7,371	43.3	−11.6
Total formal votes		17,025	99.1	+0.1
Informal votes		162	0.9	−0.1
Turnout		17,187	96.1	+4.5
United Australia gain from Labor		Swing	+11.6	

=== Barwon ===
1932 Victorian state election: Barwon
Party	Candidate	Votes	%	±%
United Australia	Thomas Maltby	unopposed		
United Australia hold		Swing		

=== Benalla ===
1932 Victorian state election: Benalla
Party	Candidate	Votes	%	±%
Country	Edward Cleary	unopposed		
Country hold		Swing		

=== Benambra ===
1932 Victorian state election: Benambra
Party	Candidate	Votes	%	±%
United Australia	Henry Beardmore	unopposed		
United Australia hold		Swing		

=== Bendigo ===
1932 Victorian state election: Bendigo
Party	Candidate	Votes	%	±%
Labor	Arthur Cook	8,239	51.6	−48.4
United Australia	John Barton	4,157	26.0	+26.0
Country	Joseph Don	3,566	22.3	+22.3
Total formal votes		15,962	98.9	
Informal votes		176	1.1	
Turnout		16,138	95.5	
Two-party-preferred result
Labor	Arthur Cook		53.8	−46.2
United Australia	John Barton		46.2	+46.2
Labor hold		Swing	N/A	

- Two party preferred vote was estimated.

=== Boroondara ===
1932 Victorian state election: Boroondara
Party	Candidate	Votes	%	±%
United Australia	Richard Linton	unopposed		
United Australia hold		Swing		

=== Brighton ===
1932 Victorian state election: Brighton
Party	Candidate	Votes	%	±%
United Australia	Ian Macfarlan	unopposed		
United Australia hold		Swing		

=== Brunswick ===
1932 Victorian state election: Brunswick
Party	Candidate	Votes	%	±%
Labor	James Jewell	14,410	62.0	−38.0
United Australia	Henry Jones	8,828	38.0	+38.0
Total formal votes		23,238	98.5	
Informal votes		359	1.5	
Turnout		23,597	95.6	
Labor hold		Swing	N/A	

=== Bulla and Dalhousie ===
1932 Victorian state election: Bulla and Dalhousie
Party	Candidate	Votes	%	±%
Labor	Reg Pollard	4,004	42.1	−12.2
United Australia	Harry White	2,937	30.9	+6.0
Country	Leon Stahl	2,578	27.1	+6.4
Total formal votes		9,519	99.0	+0.2
Informal votes		99	1.0	−0.2
Turnout		9,618	92.8	+0.9
Two-party-preferred result
United Australia	Harry White	5,164	54.3	+10.6
Labor	Reg Pollard	4,355	45.7	−10.6
United Australia gain from Labor		Swing	+10.6	

=== Carlton ===
1932 Victorian state election: Carlton
Party	Candidate	Votes	%	±%
Labor	Robert Solly	11,065	62.0	−38.0
United Australia	David Crone	6,769	38.0	+38.0
Total formal votes		17,834	97.2	
Informal votes		521	2.8	
Turnout		18,355	91.3	
Labor hold		Swing		

=== Castlemaine and Kyneton ===
1932 Victorian state election: Castlemaine and Kyneton
Party	Candidate	Votes	%	±%
United Australia	Clive Shields	5,387	52.4	+2.5
Labor	Jessie Satchell	4,887	47.6	−2.5
Total formal votes		10,274	99.7	+0.1
Informal votes		36	0.3	−0.1
Turnout		10,310	96.1	+0.2
United Australia gain from Labor		Swing	+2.5	

=== Caulfield ===
1932 Victorian state election: Caulfield
Party	Candidate	Votes	%	±%
United Australia	Harold Luxton	17,474	75.2	+26.4
Labor	William Ingleby	5,761	24.8	+24.8
Total formal votes		23,225	99.0	+0.1
Informal votes		231	1.0	−0.1
Turnout		23,456	94.3	+0.3
United Australia gain from Australian Liberal		Swing	N/A	

=== Clifton Hill ===
1932 Victorian state election: Clifton Hill
Party	Candidate	Votes	%	±%
Labor	Maurice Blackburn	10,274	48.4	−51.6
United Australia	Albert Oldus	8,029	37.8	+37.8
Premiers' Plan Labor	William Angus	2,932	13.8	+13.8
Total formal votes		21,235	98.1	
Informal votes		414	1.9	
Turnout		21,649	92.5	
Two-party-preferred result
Labor	Maurice Blackburn	11,430	53.8	−46.2
United Australia	Albert Oldus	9,805	46.2	+46.2
Labor hold		Swing	N/A	

=== Coburg ===
1932 Victorian state election: Coburg
Party	Candidate	Votes	%	±%
Labor	Frank Keane	12,030	52.8	−47.2
United Australia	Alfred Carter	8,059	35.4	+35.4
Independent	Henry Richards	2,698	13.8	+13.8
Total formal votes		22,787	97.5	
Informal votes		586	2.5	
Turnout		23,373	95.9	
Two-party-preferred result
Labor	Frank Keane		56.3	−43.7
United Australia	Alfred Carter		43.7	+43.7
Labor hold		Swing	N/A	

- Two party preferred vote was estimated.

=== Collingwood ===
1932 Victorian state election: Collingwood
Party	Candidate	Votes	%	±%
Labor	Tom Tunnecliffe	unopposed		
Labor hold		Swing		

=== Dandenong ===
1932 Victorian state election: Dandenong
Party	Candidate	Votes	%	±%
United Australia	Frank Groves	14,479	59.2	+12.3
Labor	Bert Cremean	9,973	40.8	−12.3
Total formal votes		24,452	99.0	−0.2
Informal votes		249	1.0	+0.2
Turnout		24,701	94.1	+1.1
United Australia gain from Labor		Swing	+12.3	

=== Dundas ===
1932 Victorian state election: Dundas
Party	Candidate	Votes	%	±%
Labor	Bill Slater	5,368	50.1	−7.6
United Australia	Athol Cooper	5,347	49.9	+7.6
Total formal votes		10,715	99.4	+0.2
Informal votes		69	0.6	−0.2
Turnout		10,784	95.9	+0.4
Labor hold		Swing	−7.6	

=== Essendon ===
1932 Victorian state election: Essendon
Party	Candidate	Votes	%	±%
United Australia	James Dillon	11,572	52.9	+26.8
Labor	Arthur Drakeford	10,300	47.1	−10.4
Total formal votes		21,872	99.1	+0.8
Informal votes		206	0.9	−0.8
Turnout		22,078	96.4	+0.3
United Australia gain from Labor		Swing	+12.0	

=== Evelyn ===
1932 Victorian state election: Evelyn
Party	Candidate	Votes	%	±%
United Australia	William Everard	5,771	59.4	−1.5
Independent	Maurice Fergusson	3,944	40.6	+40.6
Total formal votes		9,715	98.3	−1.0
Informal votes		166	1.7	+1.0
Turnout		9,881	92.3	−0.7
United Australia hold		Swing	N/A	

=== Flemington ===
1932 Victorian state election: Flemington
Party	Candidate	Votes	%	±%
Labor	Jack Holland	11,572	59.6	−40.4
United Australia	James Lamb	4,925	25.4	+25.4
Independent	Alexander Amess	2,918	15.0	+15.0
Total formal votes		19,415	98.0	
Informal votes		406	2.0	
Turnout		19,821	95.1	
Two-party-preferred result
Labor	Jack Holland		67.6	
United Australia	James Lamb		32.4	
Labor hold		Swing	N/A	

- Two party preferred vote was estimated.

=== Footscray ===
1932 Victorian state election: Footscray
Party	Candidate	Votes	%	±%
Labor	George Prendergast	14,325	62.3	−37.7
United Australia	John Toll	8,666	37.7	+37.7
Total formal votes		22,991	98.0	
Informal votes		402	2.0	
Turnout		23,393	96.7	
Labor hold		Swing	N/A	

=== Geelong ===
1932 Victorian state election: Geelong
Party	Candidate	Votes	%	±%
Labor	William Brownbill	7,403	43.6	−19.8
United Australia	Edward Austin	5,540	32.7	−3.9
Independent	John Lister	4,027	23.7	+23.7
Total formal votes		16,970	98.8	−0.3
Informal votes		204	1.2	+0.3
Turnout		17,174	95.3	−0.2
Two-party-preferred result
United Australia	Edward Austin	8,815	51.9	+15.3
Labor	William Brownbill	8,155	48.1	−15.3
United Australia gain from Labor		Swing	+15.3	

=== Gippsland East ===
1932 Victorian state election: Gippsland East
Party	Candidate	Votes	%	±%
Country	Albert Lind	unopposed		
Country hold		Swing		

=== Gippsland North ===
1932 Victorian state election: Gippsland North
Party	Candidate	Votes	%	±%
Independent	James McLachlan	5,859	58.6	−41.4
Country	Rowland Harrison	2,266	22.6	+22.6
United Australia	Stephen Ashton	1,877	18.8	+18.8
Total formal votes		10,002	99.1	
Informal votes		93	0.9	
Turnout		10,095	94.1	
Two-candidate-preferred result
Independent	James McLachlan		60.4	
Country	Rowland Harrison		39.6	
Independent hold		Swing	N/A	

=== Gippsland South ===
1932 Victorian state election: Gippsland South
Party	Candidate	Votes	%	±%
Country	Herbert Hyland	unopposed		
Country hold		Swing		

=== Gippsland West ===
1932 Victorian state election: Gippsland West
Party	Candidate	Votes	%	±%
Country	Matthew Bennett	unopposed		
Country hold		Swing		

=== Goulburn Valley ===
1932 Victorian state election: Goulburn Valley
Party	Candidate	Votes	%	±%
Country	Murray Bourchier	unopposed		
Country hold		Swing		

=== Grant ===
1932 Victorian state election: Grant
Party	Candidate	Votes	%	±%
United Australia	Frederick Holden	3,417	37.7	+8.2
Labor	Ralph Hjorth	3,344	36.9	−13.2
Country	Robert McClelland	2,295	25.3	+4.9
Total formal votes		9,056	99.0	+0.1
Informal votes		94	1.0	−0.1
Turnout		9,150	93.1	+0.6
Two-party-preferred result
United Australia	Frederick Holden	5,321	58.8	
Labor	Ralph Hjorth	3,735	41.2	
United Australia gain from Labor		Swing	+10.8	

=== Gunbower ===
1932 Victorian state election: Gunbower
Party	Candidate	Votes	%	±%
United Australia	Henry Angus	5,864	56.5	−8.6
Country	James Matheson	4,522	43.5	+8.6
Total formal votes		10,386	99.1	−0.3
Informal votes		93	0.9	+0.3
Turnout		10,479	95.3	+2.6
United Australia hold		Swing	−8.6	

=== Hampden ===
1932 Victorian state election: Hampden
Party	Candidate	Votes	%	±%
United Australia	Thomas Manifold	unopposed		
United Australia hold		Swing		

=== Hawthorn ===
1932 Victorian state election: Hawthorn
Party	Candidate	Votes	%	±%
United Australia	John Gray	unopposed		
United Australia hold		Swing		

=== Heidelberg ===
1932 Victorian state election: Heidelberg
Party	Candidate	Votes	%	±%
United Australia	Henry Zwar	11,192	45.0	+10.7
Labor	Gordon Webber	10,306	41.4	−24.3
Ind. United Australia	William Hemburrow	3,363	13.5	+13.5
Total formal votes		24,861	98.2	−0.7
Informal votes		463	1.8	+0.7
Turnout		25,324	93.6	+0.8
Two-party-preferred result
United Australia	Henry Zwar	13,676	55.0	+20.7
Labor	Gordon Webber	11,195	45.0	−20.7
United Australia gain from Labor		Swing	+20.7	

=== Kara Kara and Borung ===
1932 Victorian state election: Kara Kara and Borung
Party	Candidate	Votes	%	±%
United Australia	John Pennington	7,370	73.5	+14.0
Labor	Carl Adler	2,661	26.5	+26.5
Total formal votes		10,031	99.5	0.0
Informal votes		54	0.5	0.0
Turnout		10,085	96.0	+4.4
United Australia hold		Swing	N/A	

=== Kew ===
1932 Victorian state election: Kew
Party	Candidate	Votes	%	±%
United Australia	Wilfrid Kent Hughes	17,566	77.3	+15.3
Labor	Thomas Mottram	5,148	22.7	−8.8
Total formal votes		22,714	98.9	+0.3
Informal votes		263	1.1	−0.3
Turnout		22,977	92.1	−1.2
United Australia hold		Swing	+11.6	

=== Korong and Eaglehawk ===
1932 Victorian state election: Korong and Eaglehawk
Party	Candidate	Votes	%	±%
Country	Albert Dunstan	7,246	69.0	+12.2
Labor	Patrick Denigan	3,262	31.0	+31.0
Total formal votes		10,508	99.2	−0.1
Informal votes		87	0.8	+0.1
Turnout		10,595	95.4	+3.1
Country hold		Swing	N/A	

=== Lowan ===
1932 Victorian state election: Lowan
Party	Candidate	Votes	%	±%
Country	Marcus Wettenhall	6,745	62.3	+15.8
United Australia	Frederick Thompson	4,081	37.7	+37.7
Total formal votes		10,826	98.1	−0.7
Informal votes		206	1.9	+0.7
Turnout		11,032	96.6	+1.5
Country hold		Swing	N/A	

=== Maryborough and Daylesford ===
1932 Victorian state election: Maryborough and Daylesford
Party	Candidate	Votes	%	±%
Labor	George Frost	5,315	50.7	−49.3
United Australia	John Prictor	5,158	49.3	+49.3
Total formal votes		10,473	99.6	
Informal votes		42	0.4	
Turnout		10,515	96.5	
Labor hold		Swing	N/A	

=== Melbourne ===
1932 Victorian state election: Melbourne
Party	Candidate	Votes	%	±%
Labor	Tom Hayes	9,289	55.1	−44.9
United Australia	William Hendry	6,610	39.2	+39.2
Communist	Ernie Thornton	953	5.7	+5.7
Total formal votes		16,852	97.3	
Informal votes		472	2.7	
Turnout		17,324	90.3	
Two-party-preferred result
Labor	Tom Hayes		60.2	−39.8
United Australia	William Hendry		39.8	+39.8
Labor hold		Swing	N/A	

- Two party preferred vote was estimated.

=== Mildura ===
1932 Victorian state election: Mildura
Party	Candidate	Votes	%	±%
Country	Albert Allnutt	5,739	57.6	+34.7
Labor	Robert Robertson	2,530	25.4	−12.6
Independent	William Hayes	1,695	17.0	+17.0
Total formal votes		10,764	98.3	−0.1
Informal votes		172	1.7	+0.1
Turnout		10,936	92.4	+2.4
Two-party-preferred result
Country	Albert Allnutt		66.1	+6.1
Labor	Robert Robertson		33.9	−6.1
Country hold		Swing	+6.1	

- Two party preferred vote was estimated.

=== Mornington ===
1932 Victorian state election: Mornington
Party	Candidate	Votes	%	±%
United Australia	Alfred Kirton	5,833	51.4	+8.0
Country	Herbert Downward	4,181	36.8	+8.7
Labor	John Graham	1,338	11.8	−13.0
Total formal votes		11,352	98.8	+0.4
Informal votes		136	1.2	−0.4
Turnout		11,488	90.8	−0.8
United Australia gain from Country		Swing	N/A	

- Preferences were not distributed.

=== Northcote ===
1932 Victorian state election: Northcote
Party	Candidate	Votes	%	±%
Labor	John Cain	12,945	59.5	−40.5
United Australia	William Olver	8,802	40.5	+40.5
Total formal votes		21,747	98.9	
Informal votes		236	1.1	
Turnout		21,983	93.6	
Labor hold		Swing	N/A	

=== Nunawading ===
1932 Victorian state election: Nunawading
Party	Candidate	Votes	%	±%
United Australia	Robert Menzies	unopposed		
United Australia hold		Swing		

=== Oakleigh ===
1932 Victorian state election: Oakleigh
Party	Candidate	Votes	%	±%
Labor	Squire Reid	10,654	40.3	−16.7
Independent	James Smith	8,794	33.3	+33.3
United Australia	Lyston Chisholm	6,991	26.4	−16.4
Total formal votes		26,439	98.9	−0.3
Informal votes		282	1.1	+0.3
Turnout		26,721	94.6	+0.7
Two-candidate-preferred result
Independent	James Smith	15,002	56.7	+56.7
Labor	Squire Reid	11,437	43.3	−13.7
Independent gain from Labor		Swing	N/A	

=== Ouyen ===
1932 Victorian state election: Ouyen
Party	Candidate	Votes	%	±%
Country	Albert Bussau	5,192	52.2	−47.8
Independent Country	Harold Glowrey	4,748	47.8	+47.8
Total formal votes		9,940	99.2	
Informal votes		82	0.8	
Turnout		10,022	93.8	
Country hold		Swing	N/A	

=== Polwarth ===
1932 Victorian state election: Polwarth
Party	Candidate	Votes	%	±%
United Australia	James McDonald	6,981	66.4	+11.5
Country	Leonard Parker	3,535	33.6	+33.6
Total formal votes		10,516	98.3	−1.5
Informal votes		183	1.7	+1.5
Turnout		10,699	94.6	−0.5
United Australia hold		Swing	N/A	

=== Port Fairy and Glenelg ===
1932 Victorian state election: Port Fairy and Glenelg
Party	Candidate	Votes	%	±%
Premiers' Plan Labor	Ernie Bond	5,572	51.3	+51.3
Country	James Black	3,153	29.9	+29.9
Independent	Hugh MacLeod	2,132	19.6	+19.6
Total formal votes		10,857	98.7	−0.3
Informal votes		145	1.3	+0.3
Turnout		11,002	95.7	−0.4
Premiers' Plan Labor gain from Labor		Swing	N/A	

- Preferences were not distributed.

=== Port Melbourne ===
1932 Victorian state election: Port Melbourne
Party	Candidate	Votes	%	±%
Labor	James Murphy	unopposed		
Labor hold		Swing		

=== Prahran ===
1932 Victorian state election: Prahran
Party	Candidate	Votes	%	±%
United Australia	John Ellis	12,768	59.5	+16.2
Labor	Victor Stout	4,771	22.2	−34.5
Premiers' Plan Labor	Arthur Jackson	3,913	18.2	+18.2
Total formal votes		21,452	97.7	−1.3
Informal votes		502	2.3	+1.3
Turnout		21,954	91.3	−4.8
Two-party-preferred result
United Australia	John Ellis		64.1	
Labor	Victor Stout		35.9	
United Australia gain from Labor		Swing	N/A	

=== Richmond ===
1932 Victorian state election: Richmond
Party	Candidate	Votes	%	±%
Labor	Ted Cotter	unopposed		
Labor hold		Swing		

=== Rodney ===
1932 Victorian state election: Rodney
Party	Candidate	Votes	%	±%
Country	John Allan	unopposed		
Country hold		Swing		

=== St Kilda ===
1932 Victorian state election: St Kilda
Party	Candidate	Votes	%	±%
United Australia	Archie Michaelis	13,662	55.9	+10.5
Ind. United Australia	Burnett Gray	10,780	44.1	−10.5
Total formal votes		24,442	99.0	−0.2
Informal votes		237	1.0	+0.2
Turnout		24,679	94.8	+1.2
United Australia gain from Ind. United Australia		Swing	+10.5	

=== Stawell and Ararat ===
1932 Victorian state election: Stawell and Ararat
Party	Candidate	Votes	%	±%
United Australia	Richard Toutcher	5,404	50.8	−1.2
Country	Alec McDonald	5,238	49.2	+49.2
Total formal votes		10,642	98.6	−0.6
Informal votes		155	1.4	+0.6
Turnout		10,797	95.7	+0.8
United Australia hold		Swing	N/A	

=== Swan Hill ===
1932 Victorian state election: Swan Hill
Party	Candidate	Votes	%	±%
Country	Francis Old	3,381	40.0	−16.7
Independent Country	Ernest Gray	1,958	23.2	+23.2
Independent	Phillip Purves	1,826	21.6	+21.6
Country	Walton McManus	1,278	15.1	+15.1
Total formal votes		8,443	98.8	−0.4
Informal votes		100	1.2	+0.4
Turnout		8,543	93.1	+2.3
Two-candidate-preferred result
Country	Francis Old	5,030	59.6	+2.9
Independent Country	Ernest Gray	3,413	40.4	+40.4
Country hold		Swing	N/A	

=== Toorak ===
1932 Victorian state election: Toorak
Party	Candidate	Votes	%	±%
United Australia	Stanley Argyle	unopposed		
United Australia hold		Swing		

=== Upper Goulburn ===
1932 Victorian state election: Upper Goulburn
Party	Candidate	Votes	%	±%
Country	Edwin Mackrell	4,029	45.9	−5.3
Labor	John Dedman	2,867	32.7	−16.1
United Australia	Robert Forsyth	1,879	21.4	+21.4
Total formal votes		8,775	98.8	−0.6
Informal votes		109	1.2	+0.6
Turnout		8,884	93.9	−0.4
Two-party-preferred result
Country	Edwin Mackrell	5,682	64.8	+13.6
Labor	John Dedman	3,093	35.2	−13.6
Country hold		Swing	+13.6	

=== Upper Yarra ===
1932 Victorian state election: Upper Yarra
Party	Candidate	Votes	%	±%
United Australia	George Knox	unopposed		
United Australia hold		Swing		

=== Walhalla ===
1932 Victorian state election: Walhalla
Party	Candidate	Votes	%	±%
Country	William Moncur	5,708	59.1	+14.4
Labor	Harold McGowan	2,808	29.1	−16.1
Independent	Daniel White	1,44	11.8	+11.8
Total formal votes		9,417	99.0	0.0
Informal votes		98	1.0	0.0
Turnout		9,829	92.4	−0.8
Two-party-preferred result
Country	William Moncur		69.7	+16.3
Labor	Harold McGowan		30.3	−16.3
Country hold		Swing	+16.3	

- Two party preferred vote was estimated.

=== Wangaratta and Ovens ===
1932 Victorian state election: Wangaratta and Ovens
Party	Candidate	Votes	%	±%
Country	Lot Diffey	unopposed		
Country hold		Swing		

=== Waranga ===
1932 Victorian state election: Waranga
Party	Candidate	Votes	%	±%
United Australia	Ernest Coyle	4,987	56.8	+8.2
Country	John McEwen	3,799	43.2	+24.6
Total formal votes		8,588	98.8	0.0
Informal votes		102	1.2	0.0
Turnout		8,890	94.4	+0.2
United Australia hold		Swing	N/A	

=== Warrenheip and Grenville ===
1932 Victorian state election: Warrenheip and Grenville
Party	Candidate	Votes	%	±%
Premiers' Plan Labor	Edmond Hogan	unopposed		
Premiers' Plan Labor gain from Labor		Swing	N/A	

=== Warrnambool ===
1932 Victorian state election: Warrnambool
Party	Candidate	Votes	%	±%
United Australia	James Fairbairn	6,060	55.1	+55.1
Premiers' Plan Labor	Henry Bailey	4,930	44.9	+44.9
Total formal votes		10,990	99.4	+0.4
Informal votes		62	0.6	−0.4
Turnout		11,052	96.5	+1.1
United Australia gain from Labor		Swing	N/A	

=== Williamstown ===
1932 Victorian state election: Williamstown
Party	Candidate	Votes	%	±%
Labor	John Lemmon	11,367	55.7	−44.3
Independent	George Paine	6,161	30.2	+30.2
Independent	Ernest Jackson	2,874	14.1	+14.1
Total formal votes		20,402	98.1	
Informal votes		398	1.9	
Turnout		20,800	95.3	
Labor hold		Swing	N/A	

- Preferences were not distributed.

=== Wonthaggi ===
1932 Victorian state election: Wonthaggi
Party	Candidate	Votes	%	±%
Labor	William McKenzie	5,191	52.1	−47.9
Country	Francis Minchin	3,910	39.3	+39.3
Independent	William Easton	855	8.6	+8.6
Total formal votes		9,956	99.1	
Informal votes		93	0.9	
Turnout		10,049	94.8	
Two-party-preferred result
Labor	William McKenzie		54.0	−46.0
Country	Francis Minchin		46.0	+46.0
Labor hold		Swing	N/A	

- Two party preferred vote was estimated.

== See also ==
- 1932 Victorian state election
- Candidates of the 1932 Victorian state election
- Members of the Victorian Legislative Assembly, 1932–1935
