= Candidates of the 1929 Victorian state election =

The 1929 Victorian state election was held on 30 November 1929.

== Retiring Members ==
=== Nationalist ===
- Edmund Greenwood MLA (Nunawading)

=== Country ===
- Sir John Bowser MLA (Wangaratta and Ovens)
- Alfred Downward MLA (Mornington)

== Legislative Assembly ==
Sitting members are shown in bold text. Successful candidates are highlighted in the relevant colour. Where there is possible confusion, an asterisk (*) is also used.

| Electorate | Held by | Labor candidates | Nationalist candidates | Country candidates | Other candidates |
|---|---|---|---|---|---|
| Albert Park | Nationalist | Arthur Wallace | **Robert Cuthbertson** | | |
| Allandale | Nationalist | | **Sir Alexander Peacock** | | |
| Ballarat | Labor | **William McAdam** | Fred Edmunds | | |
| Barwon | Nationalist | John Bond | **Thomas Maltby** | | |
| Benalla | Country Progressive | | | Patrick Connell | **Edward Cleary** (CPP) |
| Benambra | Nationalist | | **Henry Beardmore** | | |
| Bendigo | Labor | **Arthur Cook** | | | |
| Boroondara | Nationalist | Robert Dodman | **Richard Linton** | | |
| Brighton | Nationalist | | **Ian Macfarlan** | | Angela Booth (Ind Nat); Jeremiah Grant (Ind Nat); Richard Tracey (Ind Nat) |
| Brunswick | Labor | **James Jewell** | | | |
| Bulla and Dalhousie | Labor | **Reg Pollard** | Francis Lobb | Claude Anderson | |
| Carlton | Labor | **Robert Solly** | | | |
| Castlemaine and Kyneton | Nationalist | Jessie Satchell | **Walter Langslow** | | |
| Caulfield | Liberal | | Oscar Mendelsohn | | **Frederick Forrest** (Lib) |
| Clifton Hill | Labor | **Maurice Blackburn** | | | |
| Coburg | Labor | **Frank Keane** | | | |
| Collingwood | Labor | **Tom Tunnecliffe** | | | |
| Dandenong | Nationalist | Bert Cremean | **Frank Groves** | | |
| Dundas | Labor | **Bill Slater** | William Ellis | | |
| Essendon | Labor | **Arthur Drakeford** | Arthur Clerke | | Arthur Fenton (Ind Nat); Gerald Fitzgerald (Ind Nat) |
| Evelyn | Independent | Edward Hodges | **William Everard** | | |
| Flemington | Labor | **Jack Holland** | | | |
| Footscray | Labor | **George Prendergast** | | | |
| Geelong | Labor | **William Brownbill** | | | |
| Gippsland East | Country | | | **Albert Lind** | Joseph Coate (Ind) |
| Gippsland North | Independent | | | | **James McLachlan** (Ind) |
| Gippsland South | Nationalist | Morris Mulcahy | **Walter West** | Herbert Hyland | |
| Gippsland West | Country | Robert Garlick | Reginald James | **Matthew Bennett** | |
| Goulburn Valley | Country | | | **Murray Bourchier** | |
| Grant | Labor | **Ralph Hjorth** | Frederick Holden | Edwy Finch | |
| Gunbower | Independent | | **Henry Angus** | | Edward McNicol (CPP) |
| Hampden | Labor | **Arthur Hughes** | Chester Manifold | | |
| Hawthorn | Nationalist | William Hulse | **Sir William McPherson** | | |
| Heidelberg | Labor | **Gordon Webber** | William Luke | | |
| Kara Kara and Borung | Nationalist | | **John Pennington** | | Alexander Dowsley (CPP) |
| Kew | Independent | Cyril Murphy | **Wilfrid Kent Hughes** | | Constantine Crowley (Lib) |
| Korong and Eaglehawk | Country Progressive | | Alexander Taysom | | **Albert Dunstan** (CPP) |
| Lowan | Country | James McDonald | | **Marcus Wettenhall** | Albert Bussau (CPP) |
| Maryborough and Daylesford | Labor | **George Frost** | | | |
| Melbourne | Labor | **Tom Hayes** | | | |
| Mildura | Country Progressive | John Patterson | | Albert Henshall | **Albert Allnutt** (CPP) |
| Mornington | Country | John Jack | Alfred Kirton | Herbert Downward | Joseph Burch (Ind) |
| Northcote | Labor | **John Cain** | | | |
| Nunawading | Nationalist | John McKellar | Robert Menzies | | |
| Oakleigh | Labor | **Squire Reid** | Duncan Mackinnon | | |
| Ouyen | Country Progressive | | | | **Harold Glowrey** (CPP) |
| Polwarth | Nationalist | Phillip Hill | **James McDonald** | | |
| Port Fairy and Glenelg | Labor | **Ernie Bond** | Donald Ferguson | | William Stevenson (Ind Nat) |
| Port Melbourne | Labor | **James Murphy** | | | Thomas Le Huray (CPA) |
| Prahran | Labor | **Arthur Jackson** | Alfred Cole | | |
| Richmond | Labor | **Ted Cotter** | | | |
| Rodney | Country | | | **John Allan** | Richard Doidge (CPP) |
| St Kilda | Liberal | | Robert Morley | | **Burnett Gray** (Lib) |
| Stawell and Ararat | Nationalist | Frank Brophy | **Richard Toutcher** | | |
| Swan Hill | Country | | | **Francis Old** | Thomas Connellan (CPP) |
| Toorak | Nationalist | Victor Stout | **Stanley Argyle** | | |
| Upper Goulburn | Country | Edward Withers | | **Edwin Mackrell** | |
| Upper Yarra | Nationalist | | **George Knox** | | |
| Walhalla | Country | William McGrath | | **William Moncur** | Andrew Wilson (Ind CP) |
| Wangaratta and Ovens | Country | Clive Walker | | Lot Diffey | William Higgins (CPP); Percival Inchbold (Ind CP) |
| Waranga | Nationalist | John Minogue | **Ernest Coyle** | Edward Buckland; William Pook | |
| Warrenheip and Grenville | Labor | **Edmond Hogan** | Tom Hartrey | | |
| Warrnambool | Labor | **Henry Bailey** | | | William Downing (Ind Lib) |
| Williamstown | Labor | **John Lemmon** | | | |
| Wonthaggi | Labor | **William McKenzie** | | | |

== See also ==
- 1928 Victorian Legislative Council election
