= Members of the Victorian Legislative Assembly, 1929–1932 =

- ←1927–1929 1932–1935→

This is a list of members of the Victorian Legislative Assembly from 1929 to 1932, as elected at the 1929 state election.

Several realignments took place during the period:

- The Country Progressive Party re-merged with the Country Party in 1930. Harold Glowrey remained as an Independent.
- The Nationalist Party was renamed the United Australia Party (UAP) on 15 September 1931, to match the situation at federal level.
- During the 1932 election campaign, several Labor members, including the premier, Edmond Hogan, were expelled from the Victorian Labor Party for supporting the Premiers' Plan.

Name	Party	Electorate	Term in office
John Allan	Country	Rodney	1917–1936
Albert Allnutt	Country Progressive/Country	Mildura	1927–1945
Hon Henry Angus	Nationalist	Gunbower	1911–1934
Hon Sir Stanley Argyle	Nationalist	Toorak	1920–1940
Hon Henry Bailey	Labor/Independent	Warrnambool	1914–1932; 1935–1950
Henry Beardmore	Nationalist	Benambra	1917–1932
Matthew Bennett	Country	Gippsland West	1929–1950
Maurice Blackburn	Labor	Clifton Hill	1914–1917; 1927–1934
Ernie Bond	Labor/Independent	Port Fairy and Glenelg	1924–1943
Hon Murray Bourchier	Country	Goulburn Valley	1920–1936
William Brownbill	Labor	Geelong	1920–1932; 1935–1938
Hon John Cain	Labor	Northcote	1917–1957
Edward Cleary	Country Progressive/Country	Benalla	1927–1936
Arthur Cook	Labor	Bendigo	1924–1945
Ted Cotter	Labor	Richmond	1908–1945
Ernest Coyle	Nationalist	Waranga	1927–1943
Bert Cremean	Labor	Dandenong	1929–1932; 1934–1945
Lot Diffey	Country	Wangaratta and Ovens	1929–1945
Herbert Downward	Country	Mornington	1929–1932
Arthur Drakeford	Labor	Essendon	1927–1932
Albert Dunstan	Country Progressive/Country	Korong and Eaglehawk	1920–1950
William Everard	Nationalist	Evelyn	1917–1950
Frederick Forrest^{[2]}	Liberal	Caulfield	1927–1930
George Frost	Labor	Maryborough and Daylesford	1920–1942
Harold Glowrey	Country Progressive/Ind.	Ouyen	1927–1932
Burnett Gray	Liberal	St Kilda	1927–1932
John Austin Gray^{[1]}	Nationalist	Hawthorn	1930–1939
Tom Hayes	Labor	Melbourne	1924–1955
Ralph Hjorth	Labor	Grant	1924–1932
Hon Edmond Hogan	Labor/Independent	Warrenheip and Grenville	1913–1943
Jack Holland	Labor	Flemington	1925–1955
Col. Wilfrid Kent Hughes	Nationalist	Kew	1927–1949
Hon Herbert Hyland	Country	Gippsland South	1929–1970
Arthur Jackson	Labor/Independent	Prahran	1924–1932
James Jewell	Labor	Brunswick	1910–1949
Frank Keane	Labor	Coburg	1924–1940
Brig. George Knox	Nationalist	Upper Yarra	1927–1960
Hon John Lemmon	Labor	Williamstown	1904–1955
Albert Lind	Country	Gippsland East	1920–1961
Richard Linton	Nationalist	Boroondara	1927–1933
Harold Luxton^{[2]}	Nationalist	Caulfield	1930–1935
William McAdam	Labor	Ballarat	1924–1932
James McDonald	Nationalist	Polwarth	1917–1933
Hon Ian Macfarlan	Nationalist	Brighton	1928–1945
William McKenzie	Labor	Wonthaggi	1927–1947
Hon Edwin Mackrell	Country	Upper Goulburn	1920–1945
James McLachlan	Independent	Gippsland North	1908–1938
Hon William McPherson^{[1]}	Nationalist	Hawthorn	1913–1930
Thomas Maltby	Nationalist	Barwon	1929–1961
Chester Manifold	Nationalist	Hampden	1929–1935
Robert Menzies	Nationalist	Nunawading	1929–1934
William Moncur	Country	Walhalla	1927–1945
James Murphy	Labor	Port Melbourne	1917–1942
Francis Old	Country	Swan Hill	1919–1945
Hon Sir Alexander Peacock	Nationalist	Allandale	1889–1933
Hon John Pennington	Nationalist	Kara Kara and Borung	1913–1917; 1918–1935
Reg Pollard	Labor	Bulla and Dalhousie	1924–1932
Hon George Prendergast	Labor	Footscray	1894–1897; 1900–1926; 1927–1937
Squire Reid	Labor	Oakleigh	1927–1932; 1937–1947
Jessie Satchell	Labor	Castlemaine and Kyneton	1929–1932
Hon Bill Slater	Labor	Dundas	1917–1947
Robert Solly	Labor	Carlton	1904–1906; 1908–1932
Richard Toutcher	Nationalist	Stawell and Ararat	1897–1935
Hon Tom Tunnecliffe	Labor	Collingwood	1903–1904; 1907–1920; 1921–1947
Arthur Wallace	Labor/Independent	Albert Park	1919–1927; 1929–1932
Gordon Webber	Labor	Heidelberg	1912–1932
Marcus Wettenhall	Country	Lowan	1920–1935

^{1} In August 1930, the Nationalist member for Hawthorn, former premier William Murray McPherson, resigned. Nationalist candidate John Austin Gray won the resulting by-election on 27 September 1930.
^{2} In October 1930, the Liberal member for Caulfield, Frederick Forrest, died. Nationalist candidate and Lord Mayor of Melbourne, Harold Luxton, won the resulting by-election on 22 November 1930.

== Sources ==
- "Find a Member". State Government of Victoria.
