= Candidates of the 1932 Victorian state election =

The 1932 Victorian state election was held on 14 May 1932.

== Retiring Members ==
=== Premiers' Plan Labor ===
- Arthur Wallace MLA (Albert Park)

== Legislative Assembly ==
Sitting members are shown in bold text. Successful candidates are highlighted in the relevant colour. Where there is possible confusion, an asterisk (*) is also used.

Electorate	Held by	Labor candidates	UAP candidates	Country candidates	Other candidates
Albert Park	Labor	Joseph Hannan	Harry Drew		
Allandale	UAP		**Sir Alexander Peacock**		
Ballarat	Labor	**William McAdam**	Thomas Hollway		
Barwon	UAP		**Thomas Maltby**		
Benalla	Country Prog			**Edward Cleary**	
Benambra	UAP		**Henry Beardmore**		
Bendigo	Labor	**Arthur Cook**	John Barton	Joseph Don	
Boroondara	UAP		**Richard Linton**		
Brighton	UAP		**Ian Macfarlan**		
Brunswick	Labor	**James Jewell**	Henry Jones		
Bulla and Dalhousie	Labor	**Reg Pollard**	Harry White	Leon Stahl	
Carlton	Labor	**Robert Solly**	David Crone		
Castlemaine and Kyneton	Labor	**Jessie Satchell**	Clive Shields		
Caulfield	UAP	William Ingleby	**Harold Luxton**		
Clifton Hill	Labor	**Maurice Blackburn**	Albert Oldus		William Angus (PP Lab)
Coburg	Labor	**Frank Keane**	Alfred Carter		Henry Richards (Ind)
Collingwood	Labor	**Tom Tunnecliffe**			
Dandenong	Labor	**Bert Cremean**	Frank Groves		
Dundas	Labor	**Bill Slater**	Athol Cooper		
Essendon	Labor	**Arthur Drakeford**	James Dillon		
Evelyn	UAP		**William Everard**		Maurice Fergusson (Ind UAP)
Flemington	Labor	**Jack Holland**	James Lamb		Alexander Amess (Ind)
Footscray	Labor	**George Prendergast**	John Toll		
Geelong	Labor	**William Brownbill**	Edward Austin		John Lister (Ind UAP)
Gippsland East	Country			**Albert Lind**	
Gippsland North	Independent		Stephen Ashton	Rowland Harrison	**James McLachlan** (Ind)
Gippsland South	Country			**Herbert Hyland**	
Gippsland West	Country			**Matthew Bennett**	
Goulburn Valley	Country			**Murray Bourchier**	
Grant	Labor	**Ralph Hjorth**	Frederick Holden	Robert McClelland	
Gunbower	UAP		**Henry Angus**	James Matheson	
Hampden	UAP		**Chester Manifold**		
Hawthorn	UAP		**John Gray**		
Heidelberg	Labor	**Gordon Webber**	Henry Zwar		William Hemburrow (Ind UAP)
Kara Kara and Borung	UAP	Carl Adler	**John Pennington**		
Kew	UAP	Thomas Mottram	**Wilfrid Kent Hughes**		
Korong and Eaglehawk	Country Prog	Patrick Denigan		**Albert Dunstan**	
Lowan	Country		Frederick Thompson	**Marcus Wettenhall**	
Maryborough and Daylesford	Labor	**George Frost**	John Prictor		
Melbourne	Labor	**Tom Hayes**	William Hendry		Ernie Thornton (CPA)
Mildura	Country Prog	Robert Robertson		**Albert Allnutt**	William Hayes (Ind)
Mornington	Country	John Graham	Alfred Kirton	**Herbert Downward**	
Northcote	Labor	**John Cain**	William Olver		
Nunawading	UAP		**Robert Menzies**		
Oakleigh	Labor	**Squire Reid**	Lyston Chisholm		James Vinton Smith (Ind UAP)
Ouyen	Country Prog			Albert Bussau	**Harold Glowrey** (Ind CP)
Polwarth	UAP		**James McDonald**	Leonard Parker	
Port Fairy and Glenelg	Labor			James Black	**Ernie Bond*** (PP Lab); Hugh MacLeod (Ind UAP)
Port Melbourne	Labor	**James Murphy**			
Prahran	Labor	Victor Stout	John Ellis		**Arthur Jackson** (PP Lab)
Richmond	Labor	**Ted Cotter**			
Rodney	Country			**John Allan**	
St Kilda	Liberal		Archie Michaelis		**Burnett Gray** (Lib)
Stawell and Ararat	UAP		**Richard Toutcher**	Alec McDonald	
Swan Hill	Country			Walton McManus; **Francis Old***	Ernest Gray (Ind CP); Phillip Purves (Ind)
Toorak	UAP		**Sir Stanley Argyle**		
Upper Goulburn	Country	John Dedman	Robert Forsyth	**Edwin Mackrell**	
Upper Yarra	UAP		**George Knox**		
Walhalla	Country	Harold McGowan		**William Moncur**	Daniel White (Ind UAP)
Wangaratta and Ovens	Country			**Lot Diffey**	
Waranga	UAP		**Ernest Coyle**	John McEwen	
Warrenheip and Grenville	Labor				**Edmond Hogan** (PP Lab)
Warrnambool	Labor		James Fairbairn		**Henry Bailey** (PP Lab)
Williamstown	Labor	**John Lemmon**			Ernest Jackson (Ind); George Paine (Ind)
Wonthaggi	Labor	**William McKenzie**		Francis Minchin	William Easton (Ind UAP)

== See also ==
- 1931 Victorian Legislative Council election
