= Members of the Victorian Legislative Assembly, 1927–1929 =

- ←1924–1927 1929–1932→

This is a list of members of the Victorian Legislative Assembly from 1927 to 1929, as elected at the 1927 state election:

Name	Party	Electorate	Term in office
John Allan	Country	Rodney	1917–1936
Albert Allnutt	Country Progressive	Mildura	1927–1945
Hon Henry Angus	Nationalist	Gunbower	1911–1934
Hon Stanley Argyle	Nationalist	Toorak	1920–1940
Hon Henry Bailey	Labor	Warrnambool	1914–1932; 1935–1950
Henry Beardmore	Nationalist	Benambra	1917–1932
Matthew Bennett^{[5]}	Country	Gippsland West	1929–1950
Maurice Blackburn	Labor	Clifton Hill	1914–1917; 1925–1934
Henry Bodman^{[1]}	Independent	Gippsland South	1927
Ernie Bond	Labor	Port Fairy and Glenelg	1924–1943
Hon Murray Bourchier	Country	Goulburn Valley	1920–1936
Sir John Bowser	Country	Wangaratta and Ovens	1894–1929
William Brownbill	Labor	Geelong	1920–1932; 1935–1938
John Cain	Labor	Northcote	1917–1957
Edward Cleary	Country Progressive	Benalla	1927–1936
Arthur Cook	Labor	Bendigo	1924–1945
Ted Cotter	Labor	Richmond	1908–1945
Ernest Coyle	Nationalist	Waranga	1927–1943
Robert Cuthbertson	Nationalist	Albert Park	1927–1929
Alfred Downward	Country	Mornington	1894–1929
Arthur Drakeford	Labor	Essendon	1927–1932
Albert Dunstan	Country Progressive	Korong and Eaglehawk	1920–1950
William Everard	Nationalist	Evelyn	1917–1950
Frederick Forrest	Liberal	Caulfield	1927–1930
George Frost	Labor	Maryborough and Daylesford	1920–1942
Harold Glowrey	Country Progressive	Ouyen	1927–1932
Burnett Gray	Liberal	St Kilda	1927–1932
Edmund Greenwood	Nationalist	Nunawading	1917–1929
Frank Groves	Nationalist	Dandenong	1917–1929; 1932–1937
Tom Hayes	Labor	Melbourne	1924–1955
Ralph Hjorth	Labor	Grant	1924–1932
Hon Edmond Hogan	Labor	Warrenheip and Grenville	1913–1943
Jack Holland	Labor	Flemington	1925–1955
Arthur Hughes	Labor	Hampden	1921–1929
Col. Wilfrid Kent Hughes	Nationalist	Kew	1927–1949
Arthur Jackson	Labor	Prahran	1924–1932
James Jewell	Labor	Brunswick	1910–1949
Frank Keane	Labor	Coburg	1924–1940
Brig. George Knox	Nationalist	Upper Yarra	1927–1960
Walter Langslow^{[3]}	Nationalist	Castlemaine and Kyneton	1929
Hon Harry Lawson^{[3]}	Nationalist	Castlemaine and Kyneton	1900–1928
Hon John Lemmon	Labor	Williamstown	1904–1955
Albert Lind	Country	Gippsland East	1920–1961
Richard Linton	Nationalist	Boroondara	1927–1933
William McAdam	Labor	Ballarat	1924–1932
James McDonald	Nationalist	Polwarth	1917–1933
Hon Ian Macfarlan^{[2]}	Nationalist	Brighton	1928–1945
William McKenzie	Labor	Wonthaggi	1927–1947
Hon Edwin Mackrell	Country	Upper Goulburn	1920–1945
James McLachlan	Independent	Gippsland North	1908–1938
Hon William McPherson	Nationalist	Hawthorn	1913–1930
Thomas Maltby^{[4]}	Nationalist	Barwon	1929–1961
William Moncur	Country	Walhalla	1927–1945
Edward Morley^{[4]}	Nationalist	Barwon	1920–1929
James Murphy	Labor	Port Melbourne	1917–1942
Francis Old	Country	Swan Hill	1919–1945
Hon Sir Alexander Peacock	Nationalist	Allandale	1889–1933
Hon John Pennington	Nationalist	Kara Kara and Borung	1913–1917; 1918–1935
Reg Pollard	Labor	Bulla and Dalhousie	1924–1932
Hon George Prendergast	Labor	Footscray	1894–1897; 1900–1926; 1927–1937
Squire Reid	Labor	Oakleigh	1927–1932; 1937–1947
Hon William Slater	Labor	Dundas	1917–1947
Hon Oswald Snowball^{[2]}	Nationalist	Brighton	1909–1928
Robert Solly	Labor	Carlton	1904–1906; 1908–1932
Richard Toutcher	Nationalist	Stawell and Ararat	1897–1935
Hon Tom Tunnecliffe	Labor	Collingwood	1903–1904; 1907–1920; 1921–1947
Arthur Walter^{[5]}	Country	Gippsland West	1924–1929
Gordon Webber	Labor	Heidelberg	1912–1932
Walter West^{[1]}	Nationalist	Gippsland South	1922–1927; 1927–1929
Marcus Wettenhall	Country	Lowan	1920–1935

^{1} On 2 November 1927, the Independent member for Gippsland South, Henry Bodman, died. Nationalist candidate and former member Walter West won the resulting by-election on 3 December 1927.
^{2} On 16 March 1928, the Nationalist member for Brighton and Speaker of the Assembly, Oswald Snowball, died. Nationalist candidate Ian Macfarlan won the resulting by-election on 28 April 1928.
^{3} In October 1928, the Nationalist member for Castlemaine and Kyneton, former premier Harry Lawson, resigned to contest a Senate seat at the 1928 federal election. Nationalist candidate Walter Langslow won the resulting by-election on 2 February 1929.
^{4} On 8 June 1929, the Nationalist member for Barwon, Edward Morley, died. Nationalist candidate Thomas Maltby won the resulting by-election on 6 July 1929.
^{5} In September 1929, the Country member for Gippsland West, Arthur Walter, resigned to contest Division of Indi in the 1929 federal election. Country candidate Matthew Bennett won the resulting by-election on 19 October 1929.

== Sources ==
- "Find a Member". State Government of Victoria.
