= Electoral results for the district of Ouyen =

Victoria, Australia, district election results

This is a list of electoral results for the electoral district of Ouyen in Victorian state elections.

== Members for Ouyen ==
Member	Party	Term
Harold Glowrey	Country Progressive	1927–1932
Albert Bussau	Country	1932–1938
Keith Dodgshun	Country	1938–1945

== Election results ==
=== Elections in the 1940s ===
1943 Victorian state election: Ouyen
Party	Candidate	Votes	%	±%
Country	Keith Dodgshun	5,211	67.8	−5.2
Labor	Frederick Watson	1,823	23.7	+23.7
Independent	Robert Johnstone	650	8.5	−18.5
Total formal votes		7,684	98.9	+0.1
Informal votes		85	1.1	−0.1
Turnout		7,769	87.4	−5.9
Country hold		Swing	N/A	

- Preferences were not distributed.

1940 Victorian state election: Ouyen
Party	Candidate	Votes	%	±%
Country	Keith Dodgshun	6,786	73.0	−27.0
Independent	Robert Johnstone	2,505	27.0	+27.0
Total formal votes		9,291	98.8	
Informal votes		110	1.2	
Turnout		9,401	93.3	
Country hold		Swing	N/A	

=== Elections in the 1930s ===
1938 Ouyen state by-election
Party	Candidate	Votes	%	±%
Country	Keith Dodgshun	unopposed		
Country hold		Swing		

1937 Victorian state election: Ouyen
Party	Candidate	Votes	%	±%
Country	Albert Bussau	unopposed		
Country hold		Swing		

1935 Victorian state election: Ouyen
Party	Candidate	Votes	%	±%
Country	Albert Bussau	7,289	72.2	+20.0
Labor	Wilhelm Kruse	2,804	27.8	+27.8
Total formal votes		10,093	99.2	0.0
Informal votes		81	0.8	0.0
Turnout		10,174	92.0	−1.8
Country hold		Swing	N/A	

1932 Victorian state election: Ouyen
Party	Candidate	Votes	%	±%
Country	Albert Bussau	5,192	52.2	−47.8
Independent Country	Harold Glowrey	4,748	47.8	+47.8
Total formal votes		9,940	99.2	
Informal votes		82	0.8	
Turnout		10,022	93.8	
Country hold		Swing	N/A	

=== Elections in the 1920s ===
1929 Victorian state election: Ouyen
Party	Candidate	Votes	%	±%
Country Progressive	Harold Glowrey	unopposed		
Country Progressive hold		Swing		

1927 Victorian state election: Ouyen
Party	Candidate	Votes	%	±%
Country Progressive	Harold Glowrey	3,529	39.6	
Country	Henry Pickering	3,350	37.6	
Labor	Francis Williamson	2,032	22.8	
Total formal votes		8,911	97.9	
Informal votes		194	2.1	
Turnout		9,105	86.7	
Two-candidate-preferred result
Country Progressive	Harold Glowrey	4,908	55.1	
Country	Henry Pickering	4,003	44.9	
Country Progressive gain from Country		Swing		
