= Electoral results for the district of Korong and Eaglehawk =

Election results in Korong and Eaglehawk district

This is a list of electoral results for the electoral district of Korong and Eaglehawk in Victorian state elections.

== Members for Korong and Eaglehawk ==
Member	Party	Term
Albert Dunstan	Country	1927–1945

== Election results ==
=== Elections in the 1940s ===
1943 Victorian state election: Korong and Eaglehawk
Party	Candidate	Votes	%	±%
Country	Albert Dunstan	6,028	68.7	−10.1
Labor	William Casey	2,445	27.9	+27.9
Independent	Walter Peters	297	3.4	+3.4
Total formal votes		8,770	98.7	−0.1
Informal votes		113	1.3	+0.1
Turnout		8,883	87.7	−5.7
Country hold		Swing	N/A	

- Preferences were not distributed.

1940 Victorian state election: Korong and Eaglehawk
Party	Candidate	Votes	%	±%
Country	Albert Dunstan	8,072	78.8	+1.3
United Australia	Powley Smith	2,174	21.2	−1.3
Total formal votes		10,246	98.8	−0.6
Informal votes		123	1.2	+0.6
Turnout		10,369	93.4	−0.3
Country hold		Swing	+1.3	

=== Elections in the 1930s ===
1937 Victorian state election: Korong and Eaglehawk
Party	Candidate	Votes	%	±%
Country	Albert Dunstan	8,395	77.5	−22.5
United Australia	Archibald Moses	2,431	22.5	+22.5
Total formal votes		10,826	99.4	
Informal votes		63	0.6	
Turnout		10,889	93.7	
Country hold		Swing	N/A	

1935 Victorian state election: Korong and Eaglehawk
Party	Candidate	Votes	%	±%
Country	Albert Dunstan	unopposed		
Country hold		Swing		

1932 Victorian state election: Korong and Eaglehawk
Party	Candidate	Votes	%	±%
Country	Albert Dunstan	7,246	69.0	+12.2
Labor	Patrick Denigan	3,262	31.0	+31.0
Total formal votes		10,508	99.2	−0.1
Informal votes		87	0.8	+0.1
Turnout		10,595	95.4	+3.1
Country hold		Swing	N/A	

=== Elections in the 1920s ===
1929 Victorian state election: Korong and Eaglehawk
Party	Candidate	Votes	%	±%
Country Progressive	Albert Dunstan	5,673	56.8	+0.7
Nationalist	Alexander Taysom	4,313	43.2	+43.2
Total formal votes		9,986	99.3	+0.3
Informal votes		70	0.7	−0.3
Turnout		10,056	92.3	−0.8
Country Progressive hold		Swing	N/A	

1927 Victorian state election: Korong and Eaglehawk
Party	Candidate	Votes	%	±%
Country Progressive	Albert Dunstan	5,566	56.1	
Country	Isaac Weaver	4,365	43.9	
Total formal votes		9,931	99.0	
Informal votes		98	1.0	
Turnout		10,029	93.1	
Country Progressive gain from Country		Swing		
