= Electoral results for the district of Rainbow =

Victoria, Australia, district election results

This is a list of electoral results for the electoral district of Rainbow in Victorian state elections.

== Members for Rainbow ==
Member	Party	Term
Keith Dodgshun	Country	1945–1955

== Election results ==
=== Elections in the 1950s ===
1952 Victorian state election: Rainbow
Party	Candidate	Votes	%	±%
Country	Keith Dodgshun	unopposed		
Country hold		Swing		

1950 Victorian state election: Rainbow
Party	Candidate	Votes	%	±%
Country	Keith Dodgshun	8,403	71.9	−6.0
Liberal and Country	John Meadle	3,288	28.1	+28.1
Total formal votes		11,691	98.9	−0.6
Informal votes		125	1.1	+0.6
Turnout		11,816	95.7	+0.4
Country hold		Swing	N/A	

=== Elections in the 1940s ===
1947 Victorian state election: Rainbow
Party	Candidate	Votes	%	±%
Country	Keith Dodgshun	9,256	77.9	+14.0
Labor	Raymond Peake	2,621	22.1	−14.0
Total formal votes		11,877	99.5	+0.1
Informal votes		59	0.5	−0.1
Turnout		11,936	95.3	+6.1
Country hold		Swing	+14.0	

1945 Victorian state election: Rainbow
Party	Candidate	Votes	%	±%
Country	Keith Dodgshun	7,156	63.9	
Labor	John Tripovich	4,042	36.1	
Total formal votes		11,198	99.4	
Informal votes		65	0.6	
Turnout		11,263	89.2	
Country hold		Swing		
