= Edward Cleary =

Edward Cleary may refer to:

- Edward Cleary (cricketer) (1913–1985), Australian cricketer who played for Victoria in 1934
- Edward Cleary (Australian politician) (c. 1878 – 1936), member of the Victorian Legislative Assembly for Benalla from 1927 to 1936
- Edward J. Cleary (1866–1942), American politician who served in the Washington State Senate from 1915 to 1931
