= Country Progressive Party =

Country Progressive Party may refer to:

- Country Progressive Party (Queensland), operated May to December 1925
- Country Progressive Party (Victoria), operated 1926 to 1930
