= Electoral district of Rainbow =

Former electoral district in Victoria, Australia

Coordinates: 35°54′S 142°00′E

Rainbow Victoria—Legislative Assembly
- State: Victoria
- Created: 1945
- Abolished: 1955
- Namesake: Town of Rainbow
- Demographic: Rural

The Electoral district of Rainbow was an electoral district of the Victorian Legislative Assembly.

== Members ==
Member	Party	Term
Keith Dodgshun	Country	1945–1955

Dodgshun earlier represented the electoral district of Ouyen 1938–1945.

== See also ==
- Parliaments of the Australian states and territories
- List of members of the Victorian Legislative Assembly
