= Edward Cleary (cricketer) =

Australian cricketer

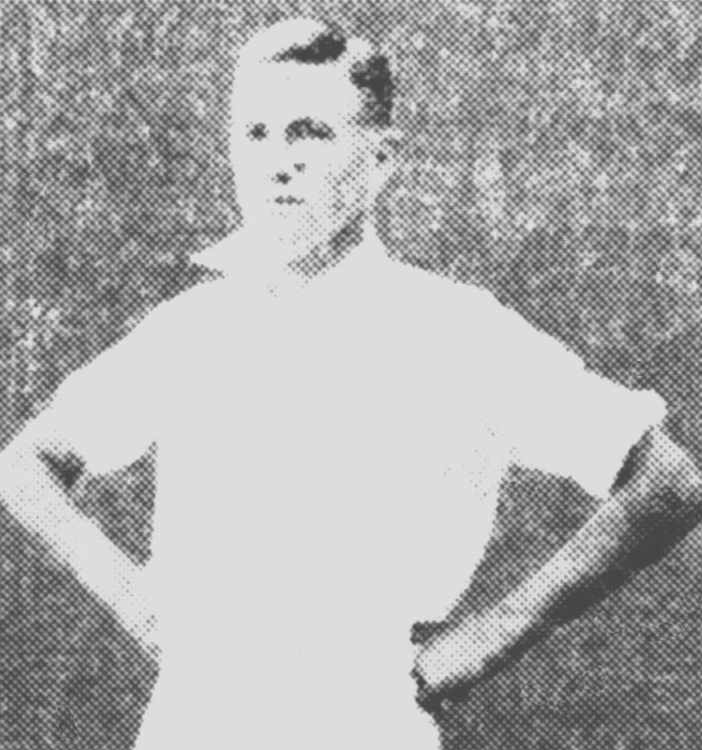

Personal information
- Full name: Edward Joseph Cleary
- Born: 18 April 1913; Benalla, Victoria, Australia
- Died: 6 April 1985 (aged 71); Benalla, Victoria, Australia
- Batting: Right-handed
- Bowling: Left-arm medium
- Role: All-rounder

Domestic team information
- Years: Team
- 1933/34: Victoria
- Source: Cricinfo, 22 November 2015

Edward Joseph Cleary (18 April 1913 – 6 April 1985) was an Australian cricketer. He played three first-class cricket matches for Victoria during the 1933–34 season. The son of politician Edward Cleary, he played locally in the Benalla and District Cricket Association as well as for South Melbourne and VCA Colts in Melbourne district cricket.
