= Keith Dodgshun =

Australian politician

The Honourable Keith Dodgshun
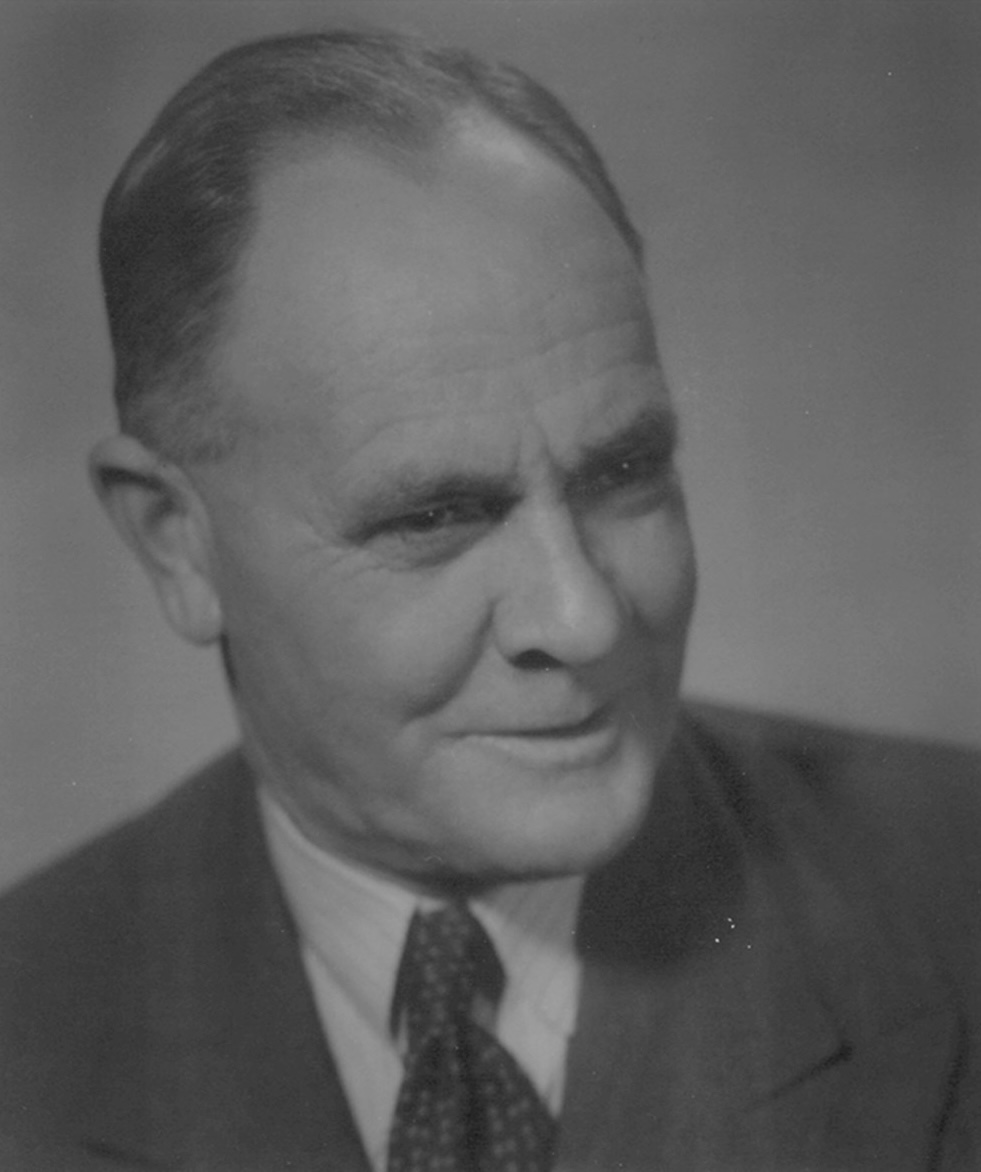

14th Deputy Premier of Victoria
- In office 27 June 1950 – 28 October 1952
- Premier: John McDonald
- Preceded by: Trevor Oldham
- Succeeded by: Alexander Dennett
- In office 31 October 1952 – 17 December 1952
- Preceded by: Alexander Dennett
- Succeeded by: Bill Galvin

Member of the Victorian Legislative Assembly for Ouyen
- In office 5 May 1938 – 3 October 1945
- Preceded by: Albert Bussau
- Succeeded by: District abolished

Member of the Victorian Legislative Assembly for Rainbow
- In office 10 November 1945 – 22 April 1955
- Preceded by: District created
- Succeeded by: District abolished

Personal details
- Born: 31 July 1893 Hawthorn, Victoria
- Died: 12 May 1971 (aged 77) Hopetoun, Victoria, Australia
- Party: Country Party
- Spouse: Dorothy Lilian Gulliver (m. 1925)
- Occupation: Wheat farmer

Military service
- Allegiance: Australia
- Branch/service: Australian Imperial Force
- Years of service: 1917–1919
- Rank: Gunner
- Unit: 1st Field Artillery Brigade
- Battles/wars: World War I

Keith Dodgshun (31 July 1893 – 12 May 1971) was a politician in Victoria, Australia. He was a member of the Victorian Legislative Assembly for just under 17 years, representing the electorates of Ouyen and Rainbow for the Country Party from 1938 to 1955.

== Early life ==
Dodgshun was born in the inner Melbourne suburb of Hawthorn to warehouse manager Frederick William Dodgshun and his English wife Rosa May Russell. He was educated at Camberwell Grammar School and the Burnley Agricultural College. He managed his family's property at Mount Egerton for several years before enlisting in the army.

== Military service ==
Dodgshun enlisted in the Australian Imperial Force on 7 November 1917, He was assigned to the 1st Field Artillery Brigade and stationed in France and Belgium during World War I. He was discharged from the army on 31 March 1919.

On his return to Australia, Dodgshun settled in Hopetoun where he worked in the soldier settlement scheme.

== Political career ==
In 1922, Dodgshun joined the Country Party and became president of the party's Hopetoun branch. From 1933 to 1938, he was a local councillor in the Shire of Karkarooc, until he nominated for election to the lower house of the Victorian state parliament.

Dodgshun was elected unopposed to the Victorian Legislative Assembly as the only candidate to nominate for the vacancy in Ouyen caused by the departure of Albert Bussau who had resigned to become Victoria's Agent-General in London, so the by-election scheduled for 5 May 1938 was not held.

Dodgshun was first made a minister when he was made Chief Secretary in Thomas Hollway's first ministry, until the coalition between the Liberal and Country parties was dissolved after a dispute between Hollway and Country leader John McDonald.

On 27 June 1950, with the support of the Labor Party, McDonald overthrew Hollway's government and was appointed Premier of Victoria. Dodgshun was made Deputy Premier, Chief Secretary, Minister-in-Charge of Electrical Undertakings and Minister-in-Charge of Immigration. Hollway briefly regained power from 28 to 31 October 1952 as an independent Premier, but his commission was withdrawn by the Governor of Victoria and Dodgshun regained his ministries in McDonald's cabinet, however McDonald was defeated by John Cain's Labor Party less than two months later at the 1952 Victorian state election.

Victorian Legislative Assembly
Preceded by Albert Bussau	Member for Ouyen; 1938–1945	District abolished
District created	Member for Rainbow; 1945–1955	District abolished
Political offices
Preceded by Bill Slater	Chief Secretary; 1947–1948	Succeeded by Wilfrid Kent Hughes
Preceded by Trevor Oldham	Deputy Premier of Victoria; 1950–1952	Succeeded by Alexander Dennett
Preceded by Trevor Oldham	Chief Secretary; 1950–1952	Succeeded by Alexander Dennett
Preceded by Sir Thomas Maltby	Minister-in-Charge of Electrical Undertakings; 1950–1952	Succeeded by Raymond Tovell
New ministry	Minister-in-Charge of Immigration; 1950–1952	Succeeded by {{{after}}}
Preceded by Alexander Dennett	Deputy Premier of Victoria; 1952	Succeeded by Bill Galvin
Preceded by Alexander Dennett	Chief Secretary; 1952	Succeeded by Bill Galvin
Preceded by Raymond Tovell	Minister in Charge of Electrical Undertakings; 1952	Succeeded by John Galbally
Preceded by {{{before}}}	Minister-in-Charge of Immigration; 1952	Succeeded by Bill Slater
