= 1929 Victorian state election =

Australian state election

- 30 November 1929

All 65 seats in the Victorian Legislative Assembly 33 seats needed for a majority
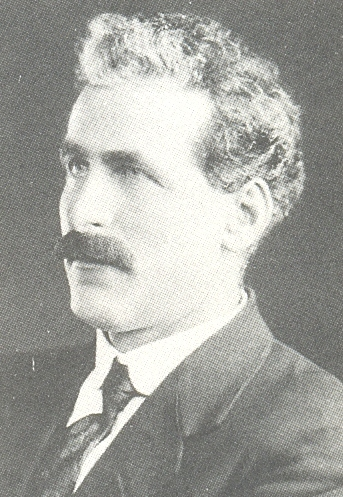

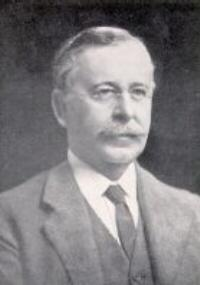

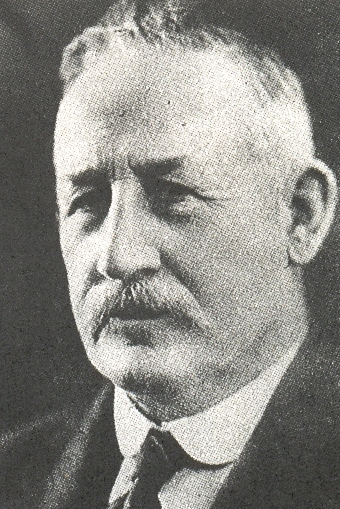
	First party	Second party	Third party
Leader	Edmond Hogan	William McPherson	John Allan
Party	Labor	Nationalist	Country
Leader since		1927
Leader's seat	Warrenheip and Grenville	Hawthorn	Rodney
Last election	28 seats	15 seats	10 seats
Seats before	28 seats	17 seats	10 seats
Seats won	30 seats	17 seats	11 seats
Seat change	▲2	0	▲1
Percentage	39.09%	38.26%	8.83%
Swing	▼2.70	▲7.37	▲0.70
Premier before election
William McPherson
Nationalist
Elected Premier
Edmond Hogan
Labor

The 1929 Victorian state election was held in the Australian state of Victoria on Saturday 30 November 1929 to elect the 65 members of the state's Legislative Assembly.

== Background ==
=== Seat changes ===
The Nationalist Party had gained two seats in the Assembly since the previous election, having won two by-elections in seats held by independents. Henry Bodman (Gippsland South) died on 2 November 1927, and Walter West won the seat for the Nationalists on 3 December. Speaker Oswald Snowball (Brighton), who had been disendorsed by the Nationalists in the previous election after voting against the redistribution bill, had rejoined the Nationalists since but died on 16 March 1928. Ian Macfarlan won the seat in the by-election on 24 April 1928.

== Results ==
=== Legislative Assembly ===
1929 Victorian state election Legislative Assembly << 1927–1932 >>
Enrolled voters	682,190				
Votes cast	639,368		Turnout	93.72	+1.96
Informal votes	6,830		Informal	1.07	−0.87
Summary of votes by party
Party	Primary votes	%	Swing	Seats	Change
Labor	247,251	39.09	−2.70	30	+2
Nationalist	242,009	38.26	+7.37	17	±0
Country	55,876	8.83	+0.70	11	+1
Country Progressive	33,798	5.34	+1.18	4	±0
Communist	1,962	0.31	+0.31	0	±0
Independent	51,642	8.16	+1.98	3	−3
Total	632,538			65	

Notes:

- Twenty seats were uncontested at this election, and were retained by the incumbent parties:
  - Labor (14): Bendigo, Brunswick, Carlton, Clifton Hill, Coburg, Collingwood, Flemington, Footscray, Maryborough and Daylesford, Melbourne, Northcote, Richmond, Williamstown, Wonthaggi
  - Nationalist (3): Allandale, Benambra, Upper Yarra
  - Country (1): Goulburn Valley
  - Country Progressive (1): Ouyen

== See also ==
- Candidates of the 1929 Victorian state election
- 1928 Victorian Legislative Council election
- Members of the Victorian Legislative Assembly, 1929–1932
