= 1932 Victorian state election =

Australian state election

← 1929	14 May 1932	1935 →

44 (of the 65) seats in the Victorian Legislative Assembly 33 seats needed for a majority
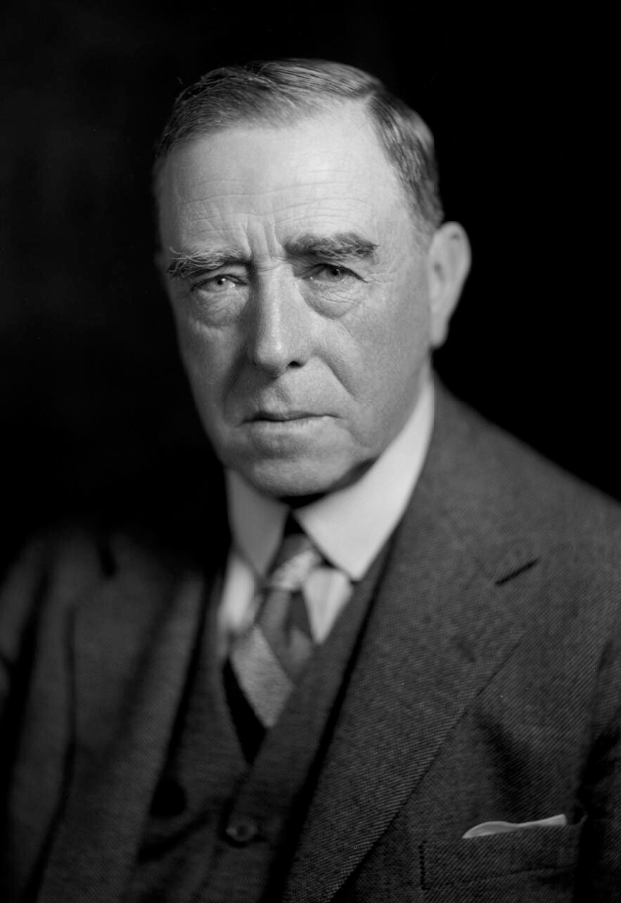

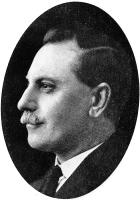

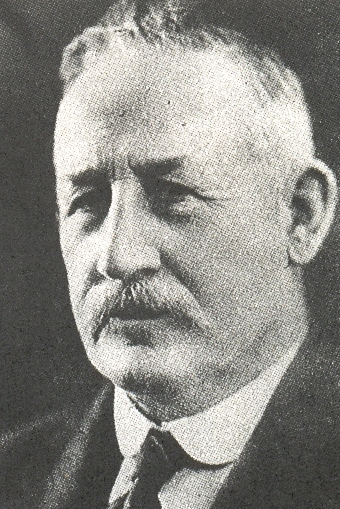
	First party	Second party	Third party
Leader	Sir Stanley Argyle	Tom Tunnecliffe (acting)	John Allan
Party	United Australia	Labor	United Country
Leader since	3 September 1930	8 March 1932	1917
Leader's seat	Toorak	Collingwood	Rodney
Last election	17 seats	30 seats	15 seats
Seats before	18 seats	30 seats	15 seats
Seats won	31 seats	16 seats	14 seats
Seat change	▲13	▼14	▼1
Percentage	40.12%	35.14%	12.33%
Swing	▲1.86	▼3.95	▼1.84
Premier before election
Edmond Hogan
Labor
Elected Premier
Sir Stanley Argyle
United Australia

The 1932 Victorian state election was held in the Australian state of Victoria on Saturday 14 May 1932 to elect 44 of the 65 members of the state's Legislative Assembly. The other 21 seats were uncontested.

== Political changes ==
The previous election for the Legislative Assembly took place on 30 November 1929. At the 1929 election, the Labor Party won 30 seats, the Nationalist Party won 17, the Victorian Country Party won 11, Country Progressive Party won 4, and there were 3 Independents. Since that date a number of political changes took place.

=== By-election ===
The Nationalist Party gained the seat of Caulfield in a by-election on 22 November 1930, arising from the death of independent member Frederick Forrest. The seat was won by Harold Luxton, who at the time was Lord Mayor of Melbourne.

=== Amalgamation of the Country parties ===
The Victorian Country Party and the Country Progressive Party—two separate parties representing rural interests—amalgamated in late 1930 to form the United Country Party. After years of negotiations, between 300 and 400 delegates of the parties met at a joint conference, and on 23 September, voted to amalgamate into a single party. The proposal was put to the parties' branches, and confirmed at a joint meeting of their parliamentary parties on 28 October.

=== United Australia Party ===
In 1931, the federal Nationalist Party of Australia merged with a group of defectors from the Labor Party who supported Joseph Lyons, and formed the United Australia Party (UAP). A meeting of the state Nationalist Party on 15 September 1931 confirmed the name change of the party's state branch in line with the federal party.

=== The Premiers' Plan ===
One of the key factors in the 1932 election was the Premiers' Plan—a deflationary economic policy to negate the effects of the Great Depression—which had been agreed to by Australia's state Premiers in June 1931. Although supported by Victoria's Labor Premier, Edmond Hogan, several of his ministers, and a majority of the Labor parliamentary caucus, the Labor Party in general did not support the plan—a meeting of the Victorian Labor Conference in August 1931 passed a motion 143 to 87 opposing the plan, and calling upon the Victorian parliament to reject any legislation to enact it.

Suffering from ill health, Hogan departed by sea to London in February 1932 and arrived in April. Although his journey was principally a "health trip", he also undertook to perform some official duties, including investigating the functions of the Agent-General's office, and marketing Victorian products in the United Kingdom.

On 12 April, opposition leader Sir Stanley Argyle gave notice that he would raise a motion of no confidence against the government, following what he saw as an equivocal reply from the Acting Premier, Tom Tunnecliffe, to a question regarding the government's intentions to re-enact the Financial Emergency Act—in effect, a continuation of the Premiers' Plan. On 13 April, Argyle's motion was carried, defeating the government in the assembly. Tunnecliffe consulted the Lieutenant Governor (Sir William Irvine), and the parliament sat on 19 April to pass the supply bill and was then prorogued with the Assembly dissolved.

As Hogan was overseas when the election was called, the Labor Party was led into the election by Tunnecliffe. As cables from Hogan affirmed his support of the plan which included wage reductions, the central executive of the Victorian Labor Party refused to endorse Hogan as the Labor candidate for the seat of Warrenheip and Grenville, nor Ernie Bond for the seat of Port Fairy and Glenelg. Despite Tunnecliffe's denials, Hogan confirmed via cable that the government had offered him the role of Agent-General which he had declined.

== Key dates ==
Date	Event
13 April 1932	The Hogan government was defeated in the Victorian Legislative Assembly by a motion of no-confidence.
22 April 1932	The Parliament was prorogued, and the Legislative Assembly dissolved.
23 April 1932	Writs were issued by the Lieutenant Governor to proceed with an election.
29 April 1932	Close of nominations.
14 May 1932	Day of polling.
19 May 1932	The Lieutenant Governor accepts the resignation of the Hogan ministry, and appoints the Argyle ministry.
14 June 1932	Parliament resumed for business.

== Results ==
=== Legislative Assembly ===
Victorian state election, 14 March 1932 Legislative Assembly << 1929–1935 >>
Enrolled voters	729,332				
Votes cast	687,042		Turnout	94.20	+0.48
Informal votes	9,676		Informal	1.41	+0.34
Summary of votes by party
Party	Primary votes	%	Swing	Seats	Change
United Australia	271,778	40.12	+1.86	31	+13
Labor	237,993	35.14	−3.95	16	−14
United Country	83,519	12.33	−1.84	14	−1
Premiers' Plan Labor	17,347	2.56	+2.56	2	+2
Communist	953	0.14	−0.17	0	±0
Independent	65,776	9.71	+1.55	2	−1
Total	677,366			65	

Notes:

- Twenty-one seats were uncontested at this election, and were retained by the incumbent parties:
  - UAP (4): Boroondara, Polwarth, Toorak, Upper Yarra
  - United Country (7): Benalla, Gippsland East, Gippsland South, Gippsland West, Goulburn Valley, Rodney, Wangaratta and Ovens
  - Labor (3): Collingwood, Port Melbourne, Richmond
  - Premiers' Plan Labor (2): Port Fairy and Glenelg, Warrenheip and Grenville

== See also ==
- Candidates of the 1932 Victorian state election
- 1931 Victorian Legislative Council election
- Members of the Victorian Legislative Assembly, 1932–1935
