= Albert Bussau =

Australian politician

Sir Albert Louis (Lou) Bussau (9 July 1884 – 5 May 1947) was a farmer, a Victorian politician, and the Victorian Agent General in London.

== Early years ==
Bussau was born in Natimuk to carpenter and farmer Johann Joachim Heinrich Adolph Bussau, and Maria Ernestina, nee Rokesky. He attended Warracknabeal state school until he was 12 years old, after which he left to work for his father. With his mother's encouragement, he continued his education, first at night at a private college, and then by correspondence with the University of Melbourne law faculty, becoming an articled clerk. He was employed by the legal firm, J.S.Wright-Smith, attending to business in the Warracknabeal, Beulah and Hopetoun districts, travelling by bicycle to visit clients. He was later commissioned to open an office for J. S. Wright-Smith in Hopetoun. He read extensively, attended Labor Party meetings, and was a lay-preacher in the Baptist Church.

On 22 April 1912, he married Mary Scott Baird, a Ballarat teacher. They had no children.

In 1915, after a terrible drought, he bought 640 acres (259 hectares) of land north of Hopetoun to grow wheat and raise fat lambs, later extending the farm in partnership with share farmers.

== Politics ==
In 1916, Bussau became a supporter of Percy Stewart and the radical Victorian Farmers' Union, advocating on rural issues.

Bussau’s interest in representative politics found local expression when he was elected to the Karkarooc Shire Council. He served as a councillor from 1921 to 1932, and was president from 1926 to 1927. In 1927, he was a founding member of the Victorian Wheatgrowers’ Association (VWA) and was a VWA organiser, becoming the VWA president in 1933.

He was the president of the Country Progressive Party in 1929 and, from 1931 to 1932, was vice-president of the United Country Party.

In 1932, he was elected to the Victorian Legislative Assembly for the electorate of Ouyen, representing the United Country Party. He was Transport Minister for a time, Attorney-General and Solicitor-General in the government of Albert Dunstan between 2 April 1935 and 1 April 1938, Bussau resigned to become Agent-General for Victoria in London from 1938-1940.[3] In 1938, he visited Germany and observed their brown coal mines. During The Blitz of London in 1940-41, he was actively engaged in Fire Watch duties and was nicknamed as "the Mad Australian" for the daring he showed in that role.

== Australian Natives'Association ==
Bussau was a member of Hopetoun Australian Natives' Association ANA Branch No. 43 when he was elected to the ANA Board at the 1919 Annual Conference. He was elected Chief President at the Annual Conference in Bairnsdale in 1923. He retired from the Board in 1933. He was a vigorous forthright speaker.

== Later years ==
In recognition of his Fire Watch and other activities in London, he was knighted in 1941. Despite receiving the knighthood, he always preferred to be addressed as "Lou".

He returned from London to Victoria via the US wheat belt, taking up the role of Air Raid Precautions adviser in 1943, based on his experience in that role in England. He became inaugural chairman of the Australian Wheat Board in 1945.

Bussau died at South Yarra in 1947.

Victorian Legislative Assembly
Preceded by Harold Glowrey	Member for Ouyen; 1932–1938	Succeeded by Keith Dodgshun
Political offices
Preceded by Ian Macfarlan as Attorney-General	Attorney-General of Victoria; Solicitor-General of Victoria; 1935 – 1938	Succeeded by Henry Bailey as Attorney-General
Preceded by Harold Cohen as Solicitor-General	Attorney-General of Victoria; Solicitor-General of Victoria; 1935 – 1938	Succeeded by Albert Dunstan as Solicitor-General
