= Lot Diffey =

Australian politician

Lot Victor Diffey (21 March 1877 – 23 February 1952) was an Australian politician.

Diffey was born in Tarrawingee to farmer Dan Diffey and Hannah Dunkley. He became a farmer at Everton and on 9 November 1903 married Jessie Catherine Mitchell, with whom he had five children; he would later marry Eveline May Hunt around 1949. He served on Beechworth Shire Council from 1909 to 1936 (president 1913–14) and Wangaratta Shire Council from 1926 to 1941 (president 1935–36).

A founding member of the Country Party who served on its council from 1919 to 1924, Diffey was elected to the Victorian Legislative Assembly in 1929 for Wangaratta and Ovens after being unsuccessful in 1927. He served until his retirement in October 1945. In 1950 Diffey moved to Cheltenham, and he died in Brighton on 23 February 1952.

Victorian Legislative Assembly
Preceded by Sir John Bowser	Member for Wangaratta and Ovens; 1929–1945	Abolished
