= Harold Glowrey =

Australian politician

Harold Glowrey (16 November 1893 – 28 September 1974) was an Australian politician.

He was born in Watchem to storekeeper Edward Joseph Glowrey and Margaret Danaher. He attended state school locally and worked for his father before becoming a farmer based around Ouyen. In 1914 he was briefly employed in a Melbourne warehouse, returning to Ouyen the following year. On 21 November 1917 he married Kathleen Frances Moran, with whom he had seven children. From 1917 to 1919 he served as assistant secretary of the Victorian Farmers' Union, and from 1919 to 1925 as secretary of the Metropolitan Co-operative Milk Company. In 1927 he was elected to the Victorian Legislative Assembly for Ouyen, representing the Country Progressive Party. When the Country Progressives merged back into the Country Party in 1930, Glowrey refused to join his colleagues and remained an independent member. He lost his seat in 1932 and then moved to Deniliquin. From 1940 to 1965 he was chairman of the Victorian Grain Elevators Board. Glowrey died in East Camberwell in 1974.

Victorian Legislative Assembly
New seat	Member for Ouyen; 1927–1932	Succeeded by Albert Bussau
