= Edward Cleary (Australian politician) =

Australian politician

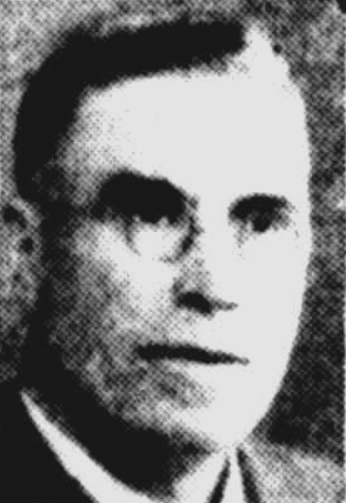
Edward F. Cleary.

Edward Francis Cleary (c. 1878 – 24 August 1936) was an Australian politician.

Cleary was born in Nooramunga to farmer Michael Cleary and Mary Moroney. He attended state schools and became a farmer at Goorambat. On 16 September 1907 he married Catherine Pelly, with whom he had nine children. He served on Benalla Shire Council from 1910 to 1936, and was president from 1913 to 1914.

In 1927 Cleary was elected to the Victorian Legislative Assembly for Benalla, representing the Country Progressive Party. In 1930 the Country Progressives reunited within the Country Party, and in 1935 Cleary became government whip. He died in East Melbourne in 1936.

One of his sons, Edward "Ted" Cleary, played first-class cricket for Victoria.

Victorian Legislative Assembly
Preceded by John Carlisle	Member for Benalla; 1927–1936	Succeeded by Frederick Cook
