= Electoral district of Wangaratta and Ovens =

Former state electoral district of Victoria, Australia

Wangaratta and Ovens Victoria—Legislative Assembly
- State: Victoria
- Created: 1927
- Abolished: 1945
- Demographic: Rural

Wangaratta and Ovens was an electoral district of the Legislative Assembly in the Australian state of Victoria from 1927 to 1945. It was located around the town of Wangaratta. It was created after the Electoral district of Ovens and Electoral district of Wangaratta were abolished in 1927. John Bowser was the last member for Wangaratta and the first for Wangaratta and Ovens.

== Members for Wangaratta and Ovens ==
Member	Party	Term
John Bowser	Country	1927–1929
Lot Diffey	Country	1929–1945
