= Albert Dunstan =

Australian politician (1882–1950)

The Honourable Sir Albert Dunstan KCMG
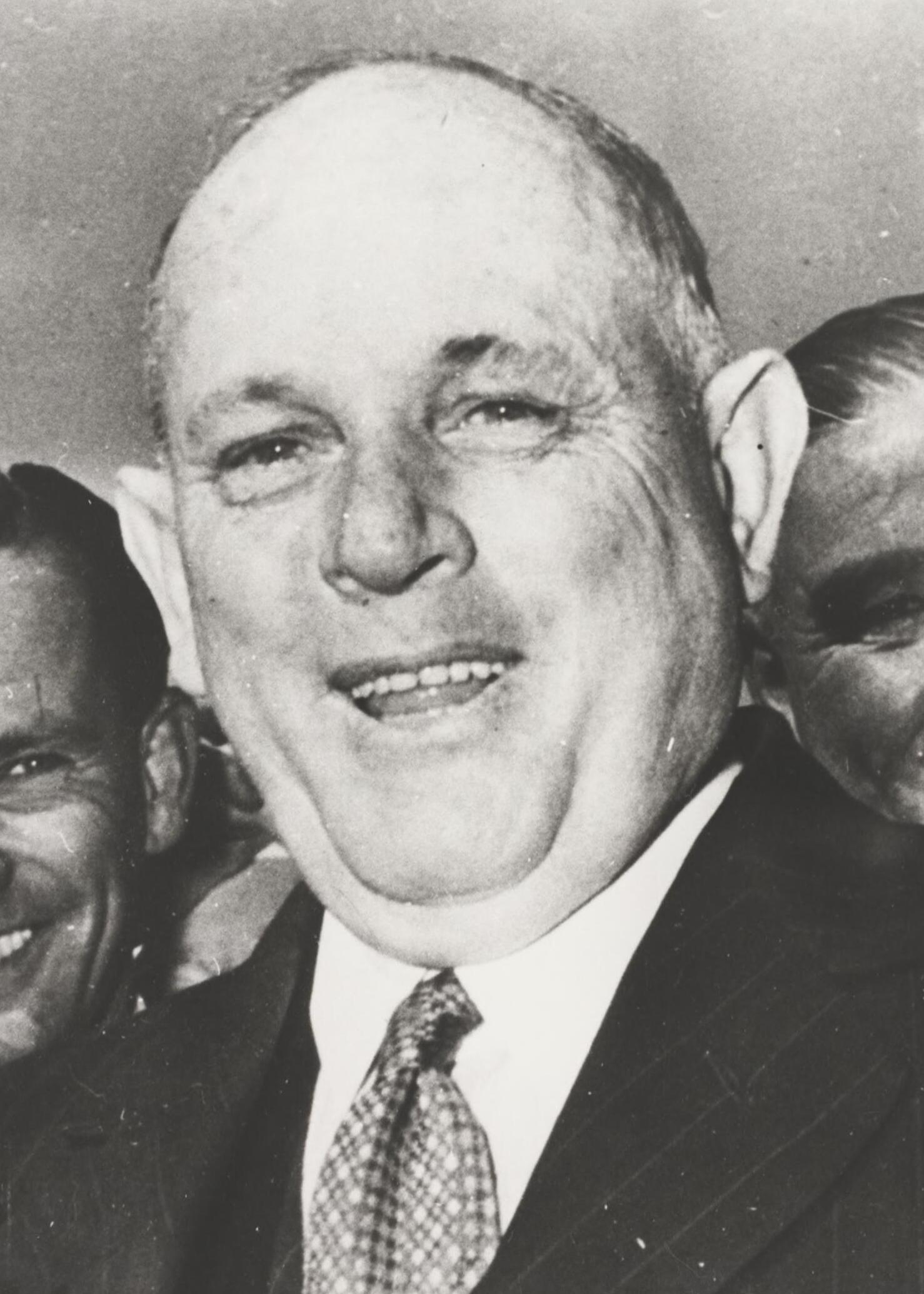

33rd Premier of Victoria
- In office 2 April 1935 – 14 September 1943
- Monarchs: George V Edward VIII; George VI
- Preceded by: Stanley Argyle
- Succeeded by: John Cain Sr.
- In office 18 September 1943 – 2 October 1945
- Monarch: George VI
- Preceded by: John Cain Sr.
- Succeeded by: Ian Macfarlan

3rd Deputy Premier of Victoria
- In office 15 March 1935 – 20 March 1935
- Premier: Sir Stanley Argyle
- Preceded by: Ian Macfarlan
- Succeeded by: Wilfrid Kent Hughes

Personal details
- Born: 26 July 1882 Donald, Victoria, Australia
- Died: 14 April 1950 (aged 67) Camberwell, Melbourne, Victoria, Australia
- Party: Victorian Farmers' Union; Country Party of Australia; Country Progressive Party
- Spouse: Jessie Gerard Chisholm (m. 1911)
- Occupation: Farmer

Sir Albert Arthur Dunstan, KCMG (26 July 1882 – 14 April 1950) was an Australian politician who served as the 33rd premier of Victoria from 1935 to 1943 and from 1943 to 1945 and as the third deputy premier of Victoria for five days in March 1935. A member of the Country Party, now the National Party, his term as premier was the second-longest in the state's history and the longest of any third-party premier. He was the first person to hold the office of premier in its own right, and not an additional duty taken up by the Treasurer, Attorney-General or Chief Secretary.

== Early life ==
Dunstan was born on 26 July 1882 at Donald East, a rural locality in the Mallee region of the colony of Victoria. He was the tenth son and thirteenth child born to Sarah (née Briggs) and Thomas Dunstan. His parents were immigrants from England, his father born in Cornwall and his mother in Norfolk.

Dunstan was educated at the local state school, leaving at a young age to work on the family's selection at Cope Cope where they grew wheat. In 1907 he moved to Queensland where he took up a "pioneer block" at Jondaryan, living in a tent. He returned to Victoria in 1909 and farmed at Goschen near Swan Hill. He later farmed at Kaneira, before establishing a sheep property at Kamarooka in 1918; he and his family lived in nearby Bendigo.

== Politics ==
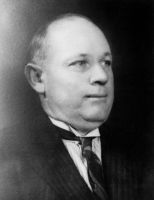
Undated photo

Dunstan joined the Kaneira branch of the Victorian Farmers' Union (VFU) in 1916. After moving to Bendigo he joined the local branch and was endorsed as the union's candidate for the seat of Eaglehawk at the 1920 state election. He defeated incumbent Australian Labor Party MP Tom Tunnecliffe and subsequently joined the VFU's parliamentary party, which later evolved into the Country Party.

At a time when the Country Party held the balance of power in the Victorian Legislative Assembly, Dunstan emerged as a leader of the party's radical wing. In 1921, he voted in favour of a no-confidence motion against Harry Lawson's Nationalist government, despite party leader John Allan's support of Lawson. Allan subsequently led the Country Party into a coalition government with the Nationalists under Lawson and Alexander Peacock, with Dunstan not receiving ministerial office.

In 1926, Dunstan and federal MP Percy Stewart led a breakaway from the Country Party, forming the Country Progressive Party (CPP). He was re-elected as a CPP candidate at the 1927 state election, along with three others. The parties reunited in 1930 as the United Country Party (UCP), with Dunstan as deputy leader under Allan.

Dunstan was the third Deputy Premier of Victoria, serving for five days under premier Sir Stanley Argyle in March 1935. Dunstan became Premier of Victoria when he and the Country Party unexpectedly withdrew his party's support for the Argyle Government.

=== Premier ===
Argyle had fought the March 1935 election with an improving economy, a record of sound, if unimaginative, management. With the Labor Party opposition still divided and demoralised, he was rewarded with a second comfortable majority, his United Australia Party winning 25 seats and the Country Party 20, while Labor won only 17. But at this point he was unexpectedly betrayed by his erstwhile Country Party allies. Dunstan was a close friend of the gambling boss John Wren, who was also very close to the Labor leader Tom Tunnecliffe (in the view of most historians, Tunnecliffe was, in fact, under Wren's control).

Wren, aided by the Victorian Labor Party president, Arthur Calwell, persuaded Dunstan to break off the coalition with Argyle and form a minority Country Party government, which Labor would support in return for some policy concessions. Dunstan agreed to this deal, and on 28 March 1935 he moved a successful no-confidence vote in the government from which he had just resigned.

When the Attorney-General and Solicitor-General Lou Bussau resigned in 1938, Henry Bailey became Attorney-General while Dunstan added the portfolio of Solicitor-General to his offices of Premier and Treasurer.

The UAP (and later its successor the Liberal Party) never forgave the Country Party for this treachery. Henry Bolte, later Victoria's longest-serving premier, was 27 in 1935, and Dunstan's betrayal of Argyle lay behind his lifelong and intense dislike of the Country Party, whom he called "political prostitutes".

On 14 September 1943, Dunstan resigned when his government lost a vote of no confidence in the Victorian Legislative Assembly on the issue of electoral redistribution. For the next four days, Labor formed minority government with John Cain Sr. as Premier. On 15 September, the Cain government was defeated in the Legislative Assembly. Cain's motion to adjourn the parliament for over a week was defeated by the Country Party and the UAP, and Dunstan moved that Parliament resume the next day, giving notice that he would move a motion of no confidence against Cain's government, confident it would be carried by the CP–UAP alliance. Cain indicated that he would request a dissolution of parliament from the Governor, but if his request was refused, he would resign as Premier. On 17 September, Cain visited the Governor who refused his request for a dissolution, Cain then resigned and the Governor commissioned Dunstan to form a coalition government with the UAP, which was sworn in on Saturday 18 September.

=== Defeat and aftermath ===
At the end of September 1945, the Dunstan government was defeated in the Legislative Assembly, when it voted to refuse Supply to his government. Five Liberal Party (successor of the UAP) members, two Country Party members and one Independent voted with the Labor Opposition, on the grounds of dissatisfaction with the government's legislative program and opposition to Dunstan's leadership. When it became clear that the Assembly would not grant Supply to the Dunstan Ministry, the Governor commissioned Ian Macfarlan, who was the Deputy Leader of the Liberal Party, as Premier on 2 October, ending Dunstan's term as Premier.

Dunstan resigned as leader of the Country Party after the 1945 state election, which saw the ALP make significant gains. He was succeeded by John McDonald. At McDonald's insistence, he returned to the ministry following the 1947 state election, which saw a Liberal–Country coalition government headed by Thomas Hollway. He was appointed Minister for Health, but served only until the coalition collapsed in November 1948.

== Personal life ==
In 1911, Dunstan married Jessie Chisholm, with whom he had six children. The family lived in Bendigo until 1943, when they moved to Melbourne. He died of coronary vascular disease at his home in Camberwell on 14 April 1950, aged 67.

== Legacy ==
A statue of Dunstan can be found at Treasury Place, East Melbourne. It is one of four statues in Premier's Lane honouring the longest-serving premiers of Victoria.

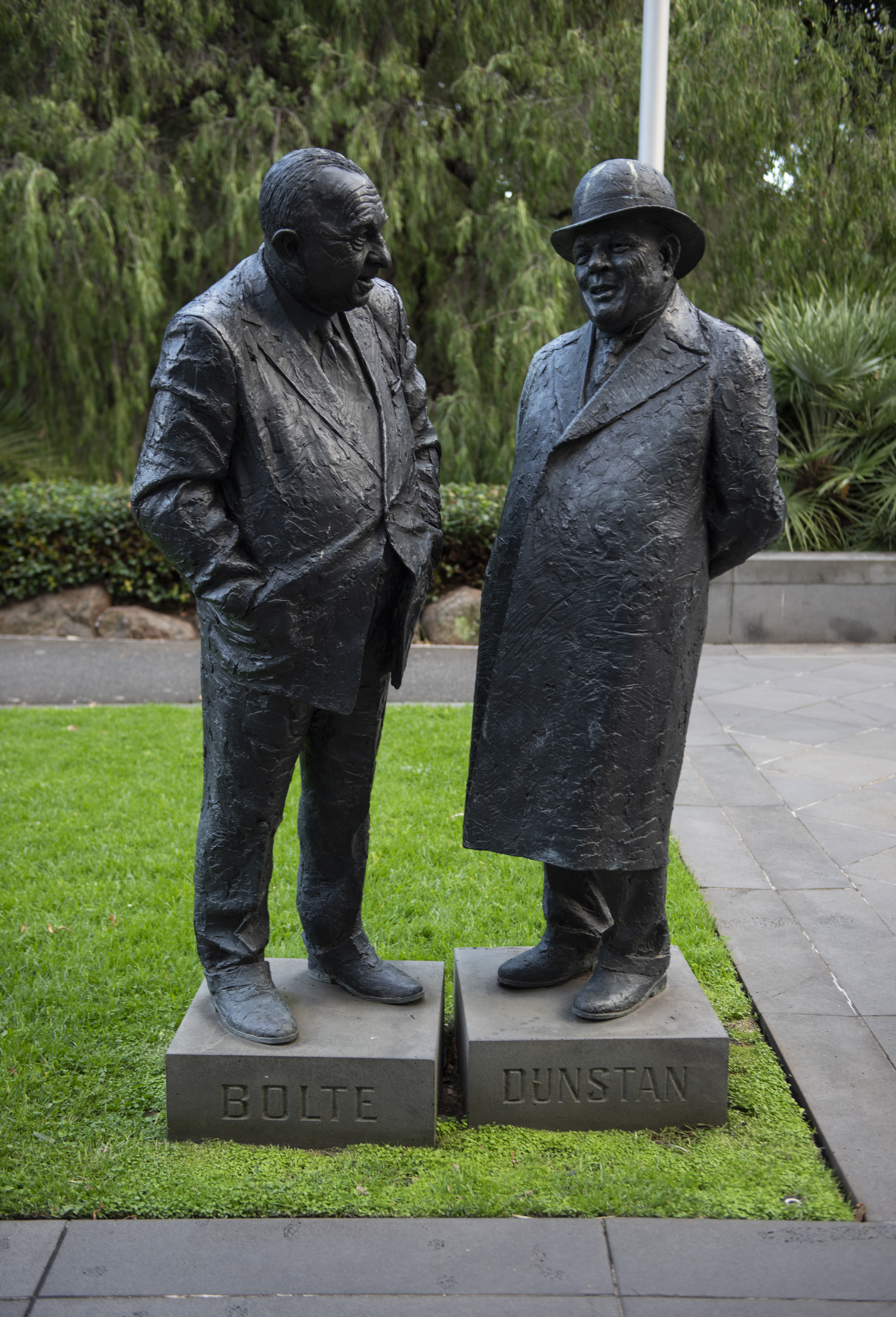
Henry Bolte and Albert Dunstan's statues at 1 Treasury Place, Melbourne

== See also ==
- First Dunstan Ministry (Victoria)
- Second Dunstan Ministry (Victoria)

Victorian Legislative Assembly
Preceded by Tom Tunnecliffe	Member for Eaglehawk; 1920–1927	District abolished
New district	Member for Korong and Eaglehawk; 1927–1945	District abolished
New district	Member for Korong; 1945–1950	Succeeded by Keith Turnbull
Political offices
Preceded by Stanley Argyle	Premier of Victoria; 1935–1943	Succeeded by John Cain
Preceded by John Cain	Premier of Victoria; 1943–1945	Succeeded by Ian Macfarlan
Preceded by Bill Barry	Minister for Health; 1947–1948	Succeeded by Trevor Oldham
Party political offices
Preceded by Murray Bourchier	Leader of the Country Party in Victoria; 1935–1945	Succeeded by John McDonald
