= Electoral district of Korong and Eaglehawk =

Former electoral district of Victoria, Australia

Coordinates: 36°30′S 144°00′E

Korong and Eaglehawk Victoria—Legislative Assembly
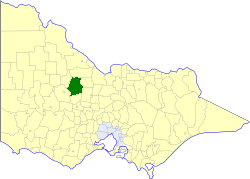
- Shire of Korong (approximation of the district)
- State: Victoria
- Created: 1927
- Abolished: 1945
- Namesake: Shire of Korong, Town of Eaglehawk
- Demographic: Rural

Electoral district of Korong and Eaglehawk was an electoral district of the Legislative Assembly in the Australian state of Victoria.

Korong and Eaglehawk was created when the districts of Korong and Eaglehawk were abolished in 1927. Korong and Eaglehawk was abolished when Korong was recreated in 1945.

== Members for Korong and Eaglehawk ==
| Member | Party | Term |
|---|---|---|
| Sir Albert Dunstan | VFU / Country | 1927–1945 |

Dunstan (who was Premier 1935–1943) also represented Eaglehawk 1920–1927 and Korong 1945–1955.

== See also ==
- Parliaments of the Australian states and territories
- List of members of the Victorian Legislative Assembly
