= Electoral district of Ouyen =

Former state electoral district of Victoria, Australia

Coordinates: 35°04′S 142°19′E

Ouyen Victoria—Legislative Assembly
- State: Victoria
- Created: 1927
- Abolished: 1945
- Namesake: Town of Ouyen
- Demographic: Rural

The Electoral district of Ouyen was an electoral district of the Victorian Legislative Assembly.

== Members ==
Member	Party	Term
Harold Glowrey	Country Progressive	1927–1932
Albert Bussau	Country	1932–1938
Keith Dodgshun	Country	1938–1945

== See also ==
- Parliaments of the Australian states and territories
- List of members of the Victorian Legislative Assembly
