= Country Progressive Party (Victoria) =

Political party in the Australian state of Victoria (1926-1930)

- Leader: Albert Dunstan
- Founded: April 1926
- Dissolved: October 1930
- Split from: Victorian Country Party
- Merged into: United Country Party

The Country Progressive Party was a political party in the Australian state of Victoria from 1926 to 1930. It was a splinter group from the Victorian Country Party. It was formed by federal MP Percy Stewart and future Victorian Premier Albert Dunstan in protest over protection of sitting members and state governments. Stewart was the party's only federal MP, while it elected four state MPs at the 1927 and 1929 Victorian state elections. The Country Progressives reunited with the main party in 1930.

Much like the Victorian Country Party was associated with the branches of the Victorian Farmers Union, the Country Progressive Party established the Primary Producers Union which established branches in parts of Victoria.

== Election results ==
=== House of Representatives ===
Year	Australia					Victoria				
Year	Seats won	±	Total votes	%	±%	Seats won	±	Total votes	%	±%
1928	1 / 75	▲1	41,713	1.61%	▲1.61%	1 / 20	▲1	41,713	4.94%	▲4.94%
1929	1 / 75	0	27,942	0.97%	▼0.64%	1 / 20	0	27,942	3.31%	▼1.63%

=== Victorian Legislative Assembly ===
Year	Overall					In seats contested				
Year	Seats won	±	Total votes	%	±%	Seats won	±	Total votes	%	±%
1927	4 / 65	▲4	31,849	4.16%	▲4.16%	4 / 10	▲4	31,849	35.19%	▲35.19%
1929	4 / 65	0	33,798	5.34%	▲1.18%	4 / 10	0	33,798	38.69%	▲3.50%
