= Victorian National Party =

National Party of Australia – Victoria
- Leader: Danny O'Brien
- Deputy Leader: Emma Kealy
- Preceded by: Victorian Farmers' Union (VFU)
- Headquarters: Collins Street, Melbourne, Victoria
- Youth wing: Young Nationals
- Ideology: Conservatism (Australian); Agrarianism
- Political position: Centre-right to right-wing
- National affiliation: Federal National
- Political alliance: Liberal–National Coalition
- Colours: Green and yellow
- Legislative Assembly: 9 / 88
- Legislative Council: 2 / 40
- House of Representatives: 3 / 39 (Victorian seats)
- Senate: 1 / 12 (Victorian seats)

Website
- vic.nationals.org.au

The Victorian National Party, officially known as the National Party of Australia – Victoria, is an Australian political party that serves as the state branch of the federal National Party in Victoria. It represents graziers, farmers, miners and rural voters.

It began as a political activity of the Victorian Farmer's Union, which became involved in state politics in 1916. It was then known as the Country Party for many years, until becoming "The Nationals" in 1975.

In state parliament it is presently the junior partner in a centre-right Coalition with the Liberal Party, forming a joint Opposition bench. The party's leader Danny O'Brien serves as deputy opposition leader, while in government the party's leader serves as Deputy Premier of Victoria.

== History ==
=== VFU/Country Party ===
The candidates sponsored by the Victorian Farmers' Union from 1916 initially used the same name but in parliament also called themselves the Country Party.

In 1923, a Nationalist-Country coalition government was formed for the first time, with the Country Party leader John Allan becoming the Deputy Premier. In March 1924 the Country Party left the government. Between April and November 1924, the Country Party supported the minority George Prendergast Labor government in exchange for a number of policy concessions.

In November 1924, Allan became Australia's first Country Party Premier. The party did so in coalition with the Nationalists, the Nationalist leader being Deputy Premier.

The Albert Dunstan-led Country Progressive Party (CPP) split from the party in April 1926. In March 1927 the VFU reorganised and renamed as the Victorian Country Party (VCP).

The April 1927 Victorian state election saw a Labor win, with the support of the CPP and independents. However, the government only survived until November, when it was replaced by a VCP supported Nationalist government. The 1929 Victorian state election returned a Labor government supported by the CPP and independents.

The CPP and VCP combined in September 1930 as the United Country Party of Victoria (UCP). In 1931, the Nationalists joined with some of the more conservative Labor supporters to become the United Australia Party (UAP).

The UCP disaffiliated from the Australian Country Party (CP) in July 1934, due to its closeness with the new UAP. The two country parties subsequently competed for federal seats in Victoria.

In 1935, Dunstan formed a minority Country Party government with Labor Party support in return for some legislative concessions.

In 1937, UCP federal MP John McEwen was expelled for accepting a ministry in a UAP-CP Coalition government. Following a tumultuous party conference in 1938, another federal MP, Thomas Paterson, led a hundred McEwen supporters to form the Liberal Country Party (LCP), a new party loyal to the federal party.

In April 1943, the LCP dissolved, with its members becoming part of the UCP. In the state election in June and federal election in August, the singular party endorsed separate "UCP" and "LCP" candidates in some seats, with those elected working together. The UCP also re-established connections with the federal Country Party organisation.

In September 1943, Dunstan resigned when his government lost a vote of no confidence over a proposed electoral redistribution. The Country-Labor alliance was over. After a four day Labor government, Dunstan returned as Premier of a UCP-UAP coalition government.

The Liberal Party of Australia's Victorian branch was formed in December 1944, succeeding the UAP.

Dunstan lost the Premiership in October 1945. A Liberal-Independent-Country coalition took its place for a month, before the 1945 Victorian state election returned a Labor Party government.

"United" was dropped from the UCP's party's name in March 1947, it becoming the Country Party of Victoria (CP).

Following the sacking of Country Party leader John McDonald as Deputy Premier by the Liberals in 1948, in March 1949, the Liberals dissolved and formed the Liberal and Country Party, attempting to merge the Liberals and the Victorian branch of the Country Party together. This was seen by McDonald as a takeover attempt of the Country Party. Six Country MPs defected and joined the new party. With the Country Party continuing independently, in 1965 this new body became simply known as the Liberals.

=== National Party ===
On 24 July 1975 the party changed its name to the National Party, following the Queensland branch who had made the change the previous year.

Pat McNamara became leader of the Victorian Nationals in 1988, and two years later reached a new Coalition agreement with the Liberals. The Liberals and Nationals fought the 1992, 1996 and 1999 elections as a Coalition under Jeff Kennett. The Liberals actually won majorities in their own right in 1992 and 1996. Although Kennett thus had no need for the support of the Nationals, he retained the Coalition, with McNamara as Deputy Premier.

Following the Kennett government's defeat in 1999, Peter Ryan was elected as Nationals leader. After a loss in the 2000 Benalla state by-election, a review was launched into the party's defeat, recommending a split from the Liberal Party. On 14 July 2000, at a joint meeting of the party's state council and parliamentary caucus, the Nationals voted to terminate the Coalition on a state level. The Nationals were steadily re-defining themselves as a party distinct from the Liberals. Soon after Ryan took over the leadership, they rebranded themselves as the "VicNats." Ryan uttered several sharp criticisms of the Liberals' most prominent figures, particularly their no-tolls policy on the Melbourne Eastlink freeway and on former leader Robert Doyle's remarks that the Liberals were twenty seats from government, a statement that assumed that the Nationals would support a Liberal government.

In mid-2000, McNamara left the parliament and his hitherto safe seat of Benalla was also lost to the ALP. At the 2002 election, the Nationals received 4.3% of the primary vote, maintaining their seven seats in the Assembly and four seats in the Council; the combined total of eleven was the minimum required to maintain Third Party status. However, they did manage to win back Benalla despite the ALP landslide; the only seat the ALP lost at that election.

Relations with the Liberal Party soured further at the beginning of 2006 when Senator Julian McGauran defected from the Nationals to the Liberals. Federal party leader Mark Vaile accused McGauran of betrayal. Ryan was equally unsparing, saying of McGauran, "People treat deserters exactly in the way that this fellow will be treated and reviled for the rest of his days. And justifiably so."

==== 2006 election ====
Many commentators had stated that The Nationals were facing electoral oblivion at the 2006 election, especially when rumours emerged of a possible preference deal between the Liberals and the ALP which would favour the Liberals against the Nationals, and the ALP against the Greens. Changes to the Upper House were also likely to slash the Nationals from four members to just one. Ten days prior to the election, Ryan gave what one commentator described the "speech of the campaign thus far" when he lambasted the major parties for their planned actions.

"Welcome", he said, "to Survivor Spring Street", an exercise in reality politics in which "associations that in some instances have been developed for years, amount to an absolute hill of beans", one in which the support offered through long-standing political partnership "is thrown back in your face".

The Nationals went on to increase their primary vote to 5.17%, winning two seats in the Assembly which were offset by two losses in the Legislative Council (the upper house). One notable victory was in Mildura, where Peter Crisp defeated the incumbent Russell Savage (one of the three independents who had removed the Nationals from power in 1999), an event which Ryan described as "an impossible dream".

Premier Steve Bracks resigned unexpectedly in July 2007. Unlike the Liberal leader, Ted Baillieu, Ryan commended Bracks on his parliamentary career and thanked him for his professionalism. This action is in step with what one commentator describes as "an unprecedented warm relationship with the state Labor Government", which includes reciprocating support for committee chairs.

==== Coalition ====
The Nationals stayed on the crossbench until 2008, when they formed a Coalition with the Liberals under Ted Baillieu. The renewed Coalition narrowly won the 2010 state election, but was ousted after one term in 2014. The Coalition arrangement was maintained while the two parties were in opposition.

Following further state election losses in 2018 and 2022, The Age reported that some Nationals MPs were prepared to push for the end of the Coalition, although this did not eventuate.

According to The Age, between November 2018 and November 2021, the Coalition's Legislative Council members voted with the Andrews Government's position 28.9% of the time; of the parties in the Legislative Council, only the Liberal Democratic Party had a lower figure (22.1%).

Ongoing leadership instability in the Liberal Party driven by John Pesutto's controversial attitude towards female MPs sparked media speculation in June 2023 that the Nationals might break the coalition to distance themselves from the Liberal infighting.

== Leadership ==
=== Leaders ===
#	Leader	Electorate	Term start	Term end	Time in office	Elections contested	Premier	Deputy Premier	Departure notes
1	John Allan (1866–1936)	Rodney (1917–1936)	27 November 1917	27 June 1933	15 years, 212 days	1920, 1921, 1924, 1927, 1929, 1932	Yes (1924–1927)	No	Resigned
2	Murray Bourchier (1881–1937)	Goulburn Valley (1920–1936)	27 June 1933	14 March 1935	1 year, 260 days	1935	No	No	Deposed; became Deputy Leader
3	Albert Dunstan (1882–1950)	Korong and Eaglehawk (1927–1945)	14 March 1935	22 November 1945	10 years, 253 days	1937, 1940, 1943, 1945	Yes (1935–1943; 1943–1945)	Yes (1935)	Resigned
3	Albert Dunstan (1882–1950)	Korong (1945–1950)	14 March 1935	22 November 1945	10 years, 253 days	1937, 1940, 1943, 1945	Yes (1935–1943; 1943–1945)	Yes (1935)	Resigned
4	John McDonald (1898–1977)	Shepparton (1945–1955)	22 November 1945	20 April 1955	9 years, 149 days	1947, 1950, 1952	Yes (1950–1952; 1952)	Yes (1947–1948)	Resigned
5	Herbert Hyland (1884–1970)	Gippsland South (1929–1970)	20 April 1955	8 July 1964	9 years, 79 days	1955, 1958, 1961, 1964	No	No	Deposed
6	George Moss (1913–1985)	Murray Valley (1945–1973)	8 July 1964	17 June 1970	5 years, 344 days	1967, 1970	No	No	Resigned
7	Peter Ross-Edwards (1922–2012)	Shepparton (1967–1991)	17 June 1970	20 October 1988	18 years, 125 days	1973, 1976, 1979, 1982, 1985, 1988	No	No	Resigned
8	Pat McNamara (1949–)	Benalla (1982–2000)	20 October 1988	16 December 1999	11 years, 57 days	1992, 1996, 1999	No	Yes (1992–1999)	Resigned
9	Peter Ryan (1950–)	Gippsland South (1992–2015)	16 December 1999	3 December 2014	14 years, 352 days	2002, 2006, 2010, 2014	No	Yes (2010–2014)	Resigned
10	Peter Walsh (1954–)	Murray Plains (2014–)	3 December 2014	25 November 2024	9 years, 358 days	2018, 2022	No	No	Resigned
11	Danny O'Brien (1974–)	Gippsland South (2015–)	25 November 2024	Incumbent	1 year, 355 days	2026	No	No	

=== Deputy leaders ===
#	Deputy Leader	Electorate	Term start	Term end	Time in office	Deputy Premier	Leader	Departure notes
1	Francis Old (1875–1950)	Swan Hill (1919–1945)	1922	1924		No	John Allan	
2	Alfred Downward (1847–1930)	Mornington (1894–1929)	1924	1927		No	John Allan	
3	Murray Bourchier (1881–1937)	Goulburn Valley (1920–1936)	1927	29 October 1930		No	John Allan	Resigned
4	Albert Dunstan (1882–1950)	Korong and Eaglehawk (1927–1945)	29 October 1930	14 March 1935	4 years, 136 days	No	John Allan	Became leader following a successful challenge against Murray Bourchier
4	Albert Dunstan (1882–1950)	Korong and Eaglehawk (1927–1945)	29 October 1930	14 March 1935	4 years, 136 days	No	Murray Bourchier	Became leader following a successful challenge against Murray Bourchier
(3)	Murray Bourchier (1881–1937)	Goulburn Valley (1920–1936)	14 March 1935	24 June 1936	1 year, 102 days	Yes (1935–1936)	Albert Dunstan	Resigned to become Victorian Agent-General in London
(1)	Francis Old (1875–1950)	Swan Hill (1919–1945)	30 June 1936	14 October 1937	1 year, 106 days	Yes (1936–1937)	Albert Dunstan	Deposed
5	Albert Lind (1878–1964)	Gippsland East (1920–1961)	14 October 1937	22 November 1945	8 years, 39 days	Yes (1937–1943)	Albert Dunstan	Resigned
6	Keith Dodgshun (1893–1971)	Rainbow (1945–1955)	22 November 1945	20 April 1955	9 years, 149 days	Yes (1950–1952); (1952)	John McDonald	Resigned due to ill health
7	George Moss (1913–1985)	Murray Valley (1945–1973)	20 April 1955	8 July 1964	9 years, 79 days	No	Herbert Hyland	Became leader following a successful challenge against Herbert Hyland
8	Bruce Evans (1925–2012)	Gippsland East (1961–1992)	8 July 1964	17 June 1970	5 years, 344 days	No	George Moss	Resigned
9	Milton Whiting (1922–2010)	Mildura (1962–1988)	17 June 1970	8 April 1982	11 years, 295 days	No	Peter Ross-Edwards	Deposed
10	Eddie Hann (1946–1990)	Rodney (1973–1989)	8 April 1982	20 October 1988	6 years, 195 days	No	Peter Ross-Edwards	Resigned
11	Bill McGrath (1936–2018)	Lowan (1979–1992)	20 October 1988	23 September 1999	10 years, 338 days	No	Pat McNamara	Resigned
11	Bill McGrath (1936–2018)	Wimmera (1992–1999)	20 October 1988	23 September 1999	10 years, 338 days	No	Pat McNamara	Resigned
12	Peter Ryan (1950–)	Gippsland South (1992–2015)	23 September 1999	16 December 1999	84 days	No	Pat McNamara	Became leader following the resignation of Pat McNamara
13	Barry Steggall (1943–)	Swan Hill (1983–2002)	16 December 1999	4 December 2002	2 years, 353 days	No	Peter Ryan	Resigned
14	Peter Walsh (1954–)	Swan Hill (2002–2014)	4 December 2002	3 December 2014	11 years, 364 days	No	Peter Ryan	Became leader following the resignation of Peter Ryan
14	Peter Walsh (1954–)	Murray Plains (2014–)	4 December 2002	3 December 2014	11 years, 364 days	No	Peter Ryan	Became leader following the resignation of Peter Ryan
15	Steph Ryan (1986–)	Euroa (2014–)	3 December 2014	11 July 2022	7 years, 220 days	No	Peter Walsh	Resigned
16	Emma Kealy (1977–)	Lowan (2014–)	11 July 2022	Incumbent	4 years, 127 days	No	Peter Walsh	
16	Emma Kealy (1977–)	Lowan (2014–)	11 July 2022	Incumbent	4 years, 127 days	No	Danny O'Brien	

== Election results ==
=== Legislative Assembly ===
Election	Leader	Votes	%	Seats	+/–	Position	Status
1917	None	21,183	6.13	4 / 65	▲4	▲3rd	Crossbench
1920	John Allan	64,500	14.41	13 / 65	▲9	3rd	Crossbench
1921	John Allan	45,348	14.01	12 / 65	▼1	3rd	Crossbench
1924	John Allan	43,961	11.97	13 / 65	▲1	3rd	Crossbench (1924)
1924	John Allan	43,961	11.97	13 / 65	▲1	3rd	Coalition (1924–1927)
1927	John Allan	62,218	8.13	10 / 65	▼3	3rd	Crossbench
1929	John Allan	55,876	8.83	11 / 65	▲1	3rd	Crossbench
1932	John Allan	83,519	12.33	14 / 65	▲1	3rd	Coalition
1935	Murray Bourchier	115,064	13.71	20 / 65	▲6	▲2nd	Coalition (1935)
1935	Murray Bourchier	115,064	13.71	20 / 65	▲6	▲2nd	Minority (1935–1937)
1937	Albert Dunstan	89,286	11.35	20 / 65	Steady	2nd	Minority
1940	Albert Dunstan	109,626	14.06	22 / 65	▲2	▲1st	Minority
1943	Albert Dunstan	123,902^{[1]}	14.39	25 / 65	▲5	1st	Minority (1943)
1943	Albert Dunstan	123,902^{[1]}	14.39	25 / 65	▲5	1st	Opposition (1943)
1943	Albert Dunstan	123,902^{[1]}	14.39	25 / 65	▲5	1st	Coalition (1943–1945)
1945	Albert Dunstan	163,940	18.67	18 / 65	▼7	▼2nd	Opposition
1947	John McDonald	177,698	14.92	20 / 65	▲2	2nd	Coalition (1947–1948)
1947	John McDonald	177,698	14.92	20 / 65	▲2	2nd	Opposition (1948–1950)
1950	John McDonald	128,537	10.64	13 / 65	▼7	▼3rd	Coalition (1950)
1950	John McDonald	128,537	10.64	13 / 65	▼7	▼3rd	Minority (1950–1952)
1950	John McDonald	128,537	10.64	13 / 65	▼7	▼3rd	Opposition (1952)
1950	John McDonald	128,537	10.64	13 / 65	▼7	▼3rd	Minority (1952)
1952	John McDonald	85,843	8.34	12 / 65	▼1	▲2nd	Opposition
1955	Herbert Hyland	122,999	9.53	10 / 66	▼2	▼3rd	Crossbench
1958	Herbert Hyland	127,228	9.30	9 / 66	▼1	3rd	Crossbench
1961	Herbert Hyland	102,184	7.14	9 / 66	Steady	3rd	Crossbench
1964	Herbert Hyland	132,067	8.76	10 / 66	▲1	3rd	Crossbench
1967	George Moss	136,126	8.65	12 / 73	▲2	3rd	Crossbench
1970	George Moss	107,011	6.40	8 / 73	▼4	3rd	Crossbench
1973	Peter Ross-Edwards	113,029	5.96	8 / 73	Steady	3rd	Crossbench
1976	Peter Ross-Edwards	144,818	7.10	7 / 81	▼1	3rd	Crossbench
1979	Peter Ross-Edwards	119,385	5.61	8 / 81	▲1	3rd	Crossbench
1982	Peter Ross-Edwards	111,579	4.97	8 / 81	Steady	3rd	Crossbench
1985	Peter Ross-Edwards	174,727	7.29	10 / 88	▲2	3rd	Crossbench
1988	Peter Ross-Edwards	188,776	7.76	9 / 88	▼1	3rd	Crossbench
1992	Pat McNamara	204,525	7.83	9 / 88	Steady	3rd	Coalition
1996	Pat McNamara	184,419	6.69	9 / 88	Steady	3rd	Coalition
1999	Pat McNamara	135,930	4.80	7 / 88	▼2	3rd	Crossbench
2002	Peter Ryan	125,003	4.30	7 / 88	Steady	3rd	Crossbench
2006	Peter Ryan	153,299	5.17	9 / 88	▲2	3rd	Crossbench
2010	Peter Ryan	213,492	6.75	10 / 88	▲1	3rd	Coalition
2014	Peter Ryan	185,619	5.53	8 / 88	▼2	3rd	Opposition
2018	Peter Walsh	167,625	4.77	6 / 88	▼2	3rd	Opposition
2022	Peter Walsh	159,373	5.0	9 / 88	▲3	3rd	Opposition

^{1} In 1943 the party reconciled with the breakaway Liberal Country Party. The two parties notionally fielded separate candidates but formed a single block; the table shows the combined result for the parties. The Country Party received 112,164 votes (13.03) and 18 seats, the Liberal Country Party, standing as the Victorian Country Party, 11,738 votes (1.36) and 7 seats, 6 of them unopposed.

=== House of Representatives ===
Election	Votes	%	Seats	+/–
1919	79,839	13.50	5 / 21	▲3
1922	65,341	14.20	5 / 20	Steady
1925	124,585	13.90	5 / 20	Steady
1928	94,071	11.10	3 / 20	▼2
1929	102,276	12.10	2 / 20	▼1
1931	89,557	9.60	4 / 20	▲2
1934	132,879	13.00	3 / 20	▼1
1937	145,500	15.00	4 / 20	▲1
1940	81,790	7.30	3 / 20	▼1
1943	85,270	7.10	3 / 20	Steady
1946	116,446	9.40	4 / 20	▲1
1949	106,190	8.20	3 / 33	▼1
1951	67,831	5.20	3 / 33	Steady
1954	43,390	3.40	3 / 33	Steady
1955	72,877	5.50	3 / 33	Steady
1958	103,735	7.40	5 / 33	▲2
1961	111,637	7.50	5 / 33	Steady
1963	116,790	7.60	5 / 33	Steady
1966	130,468	8.30	5 / 33	Steady
1969	113,958	6.80	5 / 34	Steady
1972	134,158	7.40	6 / 34	▲1
1974	151,707	7.50	6 / 34	Steady
1975	186,667	8.90	5 / 34	▼1
1977	120,032	5.60	3 / 33	▼2
1980	109,506	4.90	3 / 33	Steady
1983	114,065	4.90	3 / 33	Steady
1984	145,435	6.40	3 / 39	Steady
1987	154,088	6.30	3 / 39	Steady
1990	154,069	6.00	3 / 38	Steady
1993	137,470	5.00	3 / 38	Steady
1996	128,091	4.60	2 / 37	▼1
1998	77,385	2.70	2 / 37	Steady
2001	91,048	3.10	2 / 37	Steady
2004	105,577	3.51	2 / 37	Steady
2007	95,859	3.02	2 / 37	Steady
2010	101,419	3.19	2 / 37	Steady
2013	86,045	2.61	2 / 37	Steady
2016	163,514	4.75	3 / 37	▲1
2019	136,737	3.70	3 / 38	Steady
2022	127,883	3.77	3 / 39	Steady
2025	187,058	4.62	3 / 38	Steady

== See also ==
- Category:National Party of Australia members of the Parliament of Victoria
