= Results of the 1940 Victorian state election (Legislative Assembly) =

Australian state election results

Victorian state election, 16 March 1940 Legislative Assembly << 1937–1943 >>
Enrolled voters	841,864				
Votes cast	786,359		Turnout	93.41	−0.55
Informal votes	12,287		Informal	1.56	+0.19
Summary of votes by party
Party	Primary votes	%	Swing	Seats	Change
United Australia	274,113	35.41	−4.15	16	−2
Labor	256,744	33.17	−7.86	22	+1
United Country	109,626	14.06	−2.71	22	±0
Liberal Country	18,104	2.34	+2.34	1	±0
Communist	2,935	0.38	−0.34	0	±0
Independent	112,550	14.53	+7.20	4	+1
Total	841,864			65	

This is a list of electoral district results for the Victorian 1940 election.

== Results by electoral district ==
=== Albert Park ===
1940 Victorian state election: Albert Park
Party	Candidate	Votes	%	±%
United Australia	William Haworth	11,427	51.6	+18.9
Labor	David Casey	10,707	48.4	+8.3
Total formal votes		22,134	98.0	+1.7
Informal votes		453	2.0	−1.7
Turnout		22,587	92.9	−1.3
United Australia hold		Swing	−1.7	

=== Allandale ===
1940 Victorian state election: Allandale
Party	Candidate	Votes	%	±%
Labor	Patrick Denigan	5,533	59.0	+11.2
Country	Albert Hocking	2,624	28.0	+0.7
Liberal Country	William Chapman	1,218	13.0	+13.0
Total formal votes		9,375	98.9	−0.2
Informal votes		109	1.1	+0.2
Turnout		9,484	95.3	−0.8
Two-party-preferred result
Labor	Patrick Denigan		61.2	
Country	Albert Hocking		38.8	
Labor hold		Swing	+10.6	

- Two party preferred vote was estimated.

=== Ballarat ===
1940 Victorian state election: Ballarat
Party	Candidate	Votes	%	±%
United Australia	Thomas Hollway	10,902	65.5	−1.0
Labor	Thomas Jude	5,728	34.5	+1.0
Total formal votes		16,630	99.4	+0.2
Informal votes		107	0.6	−0.2
Turnout		16,737	94.3	−1.0
United Australia hold		Swing	−1.0	

=== Barwon ===
1940 Victorian state election: Barwon
Party	Candidate	Votes	%	±%
United Australia	Thomas Maltby	unopposed		
United Australia hold		Swing		

=== Benalla ===
1940 Victorian state election: Benalla
Party	Candidate	Votes	%	±%
Liberal Country	Frederick Cook	5,592	55.0	+55.0
Country	Manvers Meadows	4,580	45.0	+19.2
Total formal votes		10,172	98.9	0.0
Informal votes		115	1.1	0.0
Turnout		10,287	91.9	−3.1
Liberal Country gain from Independent		Swing	N/A	

=== Benambra ===
1940 Victorian state election: Benambra
Party	Candidate	Votes	%	±%
Country	Roy Paton	unopposed		
Country hold		Swing		

=== Bendigo ===
1940 Victorian state election: Bendigo
Party	Candidate	Votes	%	±%
Labor	Arthur Cook	unopposed		
Labor hold		Swing		

=== Boroondara ===
1940 Victorian state election: Boroondara
Party	Candidate	Votes	%	±%
United Australia	Trevor Oldham	21,921	70.4	−29.6
Independent	Reuben Kefford	9,196	29.6	+29.6
Total formal votes		31,117	98.2	
Informal votes		585	1.8	
Turnout		31,702	92.7	
United Australia hold		Swing		

=== Brighton ===
1940 Victorian state election: Brighton
Party	Candidate	Votes	%	±%
Independent	Ian Macfarlan	16,507	57.2	+57.2
United Australia	Robert Breen	8,519	29.5	−52.5
Independent	John Warren	3,845	13.3	+13.3
Total formal votes		28,871	97.8	0.0
Informal votes		662	2.2	0.0
Turnout		29,533	94.2	+1.5
Independent gain from United Australia		Swing	N/A	

- Preferences were not distributed.

=== Brunswick ===
1940 Victorian state election: Brunswick
Party	Candidate	Votes	%	±%
Labor	James Jewell	unopposed		
Labor hold		Swing		

=== Bulla and Dalhousie ===
1940 Victorian state election: Bulla and Dalhousie
Party	Candidate	Votes	%	±%
United Australia	Harry White	3,581	39.2	−6.2
Labor	Charlie Mutton	3,304	36.1	+5.5
Country	John Milligan	2,254	24.7	+0.7
Total formal votes		9,139	99.0	+0.1
Informal votes		94	1.0	−0.1
Turnout		9,233	92.9	−0.7
Two-party-preferred result
United Australia	Harry White	4,781	52.3	−4.0
Labor	Charlie Mutton	4,358	47.7	+4.0
United Australia hold		Swing	−4.0	

=== Carlton ===
1940 Victorian state election: Carlton
Party	Candidate	Votes	%	±%
Labor	Bill Barry	13,058	71.3	−28.7
United Australia	David Mandie	3,716	20.3	+20.3
Communist	Ralph Gibson	1,547	8.4	+8.4
Total formal votes		18,321	95.8	
Informal votes		804	4.2	
Turnout		19,125	88.8	
Two-party-preferred result
Labor	Bill Barry		78.9	
United Australia	David Mandie		21.1	
Labor hold		Swing	N/A	

- Two party preferred vote was estimated.

=== Castlemaine and Kyneton ===
1940 Victorian state election: Castlemaine and Kyneton
Party	Candidate	Votes	%	±%
Labor	Bill Hodson	5,844	57.7	+9.4
United Australia	Charles Lucas	4,279	42.3	−9.4
Total formal votes		10,123	98.9	−0.5
Informal votes		109	1.1	+0.5
Turnout		10,232	94.6	+0.2
Labor gain from United Australia		Swing	+9.4	

=== Caulfield ===
1940 Victorian state election: Caulfield
Party	Candidate	Votes	%	±%
United Australia	Harold Cohen	19,178	71.5	−28.5
Independent	Mary Jones	7,644	28.5	+28.5
Total formal votes		26,822	98.2	
Informal votes		501	1.8	
Turnout		27,323	92.8	
United Australia hold		Swing	N/A	

=== Clifton Hill ===
1940 Victorian state election: Clifton Hill
Party	Candidate	Votes	%	±%
Labor	Bert Cremean	14,533	66.0	−1.8
United Australia	Reginald Archer	7,489	34.0	+1.8
Total formal votes		22,022	98.2	−0.3
Informal votes		406	1.8	+0.3
Turnout		22,428	92.9	−0.1
Labor hold		Swing	−1.8	

=== Coburg ===
1940 Victorian state election: Coburg
Party	Candidate	Votes	%	±%
Labor	Frank Keane	17,927	67.1	+4.3
United Australia	Richard Griffiths	8,810	32.9	−4.3
Total formal votes		26,737	98.6	−0.4
Informal votes		382	1.4	+0.4
Turnout		27,119	93.2	−2.0
Labor hold		Swing	+4.3	

=== Collingwood ===
1940 Victorian state election: Collingwood
Party	Candidate	Votes	%	±%
Labor	Tom Tunnecliffe	9,694	48.3	−33.2
Independent Labor	James Baker	7,023	35.0	+35.0
United Australia	Frederick Dods	1,950	9.7	−8.8
Communist	John Blake	1,388	6.9	+6.9
Total formal votes		20,055	95.7	−2.5
Informal votes		893	4.3	+2.5
Turnout		20,948	91.0	−1.6
Two-candidate-preferred result
Labor	Tom Tunnecliffe		52.1	
Independent	James Baker		47.9	
Labor hold		Swing	N/A	

- Two candidate preferred vote was estimated.

=== Dandenong ===
1940 Victorian state election: Dandenong
Party	Candidate	Votes	%	±%
Labor	Frank Field	18,699	60.8	+10.2
United Australia	Leslie Sheppard	12,030	39.2	−10.2
Total formal votes		30,729	98.9	+0.2
Informal votes		349	1.1	−0.2
Turnout		31,078	93.7	−0.7
Labor hold		Swing	+10.2	

=== Dundas ===
1940 Victorian state election: Dundas
Party	Candidate	Votes	%	±%
Labor	Bill Slater	7,358	63.0	−37.0
United Australia	William Ellis	4,319	37.0	+37.0
Total formal votes		11,677	99.4	
Informal votes		70	0.6	
Turnout		11,747	95.0	
Labor hold		Swing	N/A	

=== Essendon ===
1940 Victorian state election: Essendon
Party	Candidate	Votes	%	±%
United Australia	James Dillon	12,931	51.6	−3.1
Labor	Arthur Clarey	12,149	48.4	+3.1
Total formal votes		25,080	99.0	+0.1
Informal votes		261	1.0	−0.1
Turnout		25,341	95.4	−1.3
United Australia hold		Swing	−3.1	

=== Evelyn ===
1940 Victorian state election: Evelyn
Party	Candidate	Votes	%	±%
United Australia	William Everard	unopposed		
United Australia hold		Swing		

=== Flemington ===
1940 Victorian state election: Flemington
Party	Candidate	Votes	%	±%
Labor	Jack Holland	16,060	75.9	+10.0
United Australia	Raymond Trickey	5,096	24.1	−10.0
Total formal votes		21,156	98.3	−0.2
Informal votes		357	1.7	+0.2
Turnout		21,513	92.4	−3.7
Labor hold		Swing	+10.0	

=== Footscray ===
1940 Victorian state election: Footscray
Party	Candidate	Votes	%	±%
Labor	Jack Mullens	unopposed		
Labor hold		Swing		

=== Geelong ===
1940 Victorian state election: Geelong
Party	Candidate	Votes	%	±%
Labor	Fanny Brownbill	12,456	67.3	−32.7
United Australia	Nathaniel White	6,041	32.7	+32.7
Total formal votes		18,497	99.4	
Informal votes		117	0.6	
Turnout		18,614	95.4	
Labor hold		Swing	N/A	

=== Gippsland East ===
1940 Victorian state election: Gippsland East
Party	Candidate	Votes	%	±%
Country	Albert Lind	unopposed		
Country hold		Swing		

=== Gippsland North ===
1940 Victorian state election: Gippsland North
Party	Candidate	Votes	%	±%
Country	Alexander Borthwick	4,592	45.7	+24.2
Labor	Albert Ainsworth	3,402	33.8	+14.8
Liberal Country	Stephen Ashton	2,060	20.5	+20.5
Total formal votes		10,054	98.9	0.0
Informal votes		108	1.1	0.0
Turnout		10,162	92.1	−2.0
Two-party-preferred result
Country	Alexander Borthwick	6,027	59.9	+11.9
Labor	Albert Ainsworth	4,027	40.1	+40.1
Country gain from Independent		Swing	N/A	

=== Gippsland South ===
1940 Victorian state election: Gippsland South
Party	Candidate	Votes	%	±%
Country	Herbert Hyland	unopposed		
Country hold		Swing		

=== Gippsland West ===
1940 Victorian state election: Gippsland West
Party	Candidate	Votes	%	±%
Country	Matthew Bennett	7,086	68.2	−31.8
Liberal Country	Clement McCrostie	1,676	16.2	+16.2
Independent	Harold Edwards	1,630	15.7	+15.7
Total formal votes		10,392	97.7	
Informal votes		244	2.3	
Turnout		10,636	92.9	
Country hold		Swing	N/A	

- Preferences were not distributed.

=== Goulburn Valley ===
1940 Victorian state election: Goulburn Valley
Party	Candidate	Votes	%	±%
Country	John McDonald	unopposed		
Country hold		Swing		

=== Grant ===
1940 Victorian state election: Grant
Party	Candidate	Votes	%	±%
Ind. United Australia	Frederick Holden	unopposed		
Ind. United Australia gain from United Australia		Swing	N/A	

=== Gunbower ===
1940 Victorian state election: Gunbower
Party	Candidate	Votes	%	±%
Country	Norman Martin	unopposed		
Country hold		Swing		

=== Hampden ===
1940 Victorian state election: Hampden
Party	Candidate	Votes	%	±%
United Australia	William Cumming	5,045	48.6	+5.6
Labor	Walter Kervin	3,382	32.6	+0.3
Country	Thomas Moore	1,957	18.9	−5.8
Total formal votes		10,384	98.7	−0.4
Informal votes		138	1.3	+0.4
Turnout		10,522	94.9	0.0
Two-party-preferred result
United Australia	William Cumming	6,197	59.7	+0.6
Labor	Walter Kervin	4,187	40.3	−0.6
United Australia hold		Swing	+0.6	

=== Hawthorn ===
1940 Victorian state election: Hawthorn
Party	Candidate	Votes	%	±%
Independent	Leslie Hollins	12,918	53.9	+53.9
United Australia	Les Tyack	11,034	46.1	−14.4
Total formal votes		12,918	98.8	−0.1
Informal votes		301	1.2	+0.1
Turnout		24,253	93.7	+1.6
Independent gain from United Australia		Swing	N/A	

=== Heidelberg ===
1940 Victorian state election: Heidelberg
Party	Candidate	Votes	%	±%
United Australia	Henry Zwar	19,226	63.6	+11.3
Labor	James O'Meara	11,024	36.4	−11.3
Total formal votes		30,250	99.0	−0.3
Informal votes		312	1.0	+0.3
Turnout		30,562	95.3	+0.2
United Australia hold		Swing	+11.3	

=== Kara Kara and Borung ===
1940 Victorian state election: Kara Kara and Borung
Party	Candidate	Votes	%	±%
Country	Finlay Cameron	5,117	50.2	−10.2
Country	Patrick Toohey	2,678	26.3	+26.3
Independent	John Green	2,390	23.5	−16.1
Total formal votes		10,185	99.1	−0.3
Informal votes		94	0.9	+0.3
Turnout		10,279	95.3	+1.2
Two-candidate-preferred result
Country	Finlay Cameron		56.1	−4.3
Country	Patrick Toohey		43.9	+43.9
Country hold		Swing	N/A	

- Two candidate preferred vote was estimated.

=== Kew ===
1940 Victorian state election: Kew
Party	Candidate	Votes	%	±%
United Australia	Wilfrid Kent Hughes	18,496	68.0	−0.1
Labor	Arthur Kyle	8,716	32.0	+0.1
Total formal votes		27,212	98.8	0.0
Informal votes		321	1.2	0.0
Turnout		27,533	92.8	+0.8
United Australia hold		Swing	−0.1	

=== Korong and Eaglehawk ===
1940 Victorian state election: Korong and Eaglehawk
Party	Candidate	Votes	%	±%
Country	Albert Dunstan	8,072	78.8	+1.3
United Australia	Powley Smith	2,174	21.2	−1.3
Total formal votes		10,246	98.8	−0.6
Informal votes		123	1.2	+0.6
Turnout		10,369	93.4	−0.3
Country hold		Swing	+1.3	

=== Lowan ===
1940 Victorian state election: Lowan
Party	Candidate	Votes	%	±%
Country	Hamilton Lamb	5,525	47.8	−18.0
Independent	Winton Turnbull	2,962	25.7	+25.7
United Australia	Arthur Bennett	2,267	19.6	−14.6
Independent	Marcus Wettenhall	794	7.4	+7.4
Total formal votes		11,548	98.1	−1.2
Informal votes		223	1.9	+1.2
Turnout		11,771	94.9	+0.5
Two-candidate-preferred result
Country	Hamilton Lamb		55.5	−10.3
Independent	Winton Turnbull		44.5	+44.5
Country hold		Swing	N/A	

- Two candidate preferred vote was estimated.

=== Maryborough and Daylesford ===
1940 Victorian state election: Maryborough and Daylesford
Party	Candidate	Votes	%	±%
Labor	George Frost	unopposed		
Labor hold		Swing		

=== Melbourne ===
1940 Victorian state election: Melbourne
Party	Candidate	Votes	%	±%
Labor	Tom Hayes	unopposed		
Labor hold		Swing		

=== Mildura ===
1940 Victorian state election: Mildura
Party	Candidate	Votes	%	±%
Country	Albert Allnutt	4,525	38.4	−20.9
Country	Alfred Rawlings	3,878	32.9	+32.9
Independent Labor	John Egan	3,376	28.7	+28.7
Total formal votes		11,779	97.2	−1.7
Informal votes		342	2.8	+1.7
Turnout		12,121	93.0	+0.2
Two-candidate-preferred result
Country	Albert Allnutt	6,296	53.4	−5.9
Country	Alfred Rawlings	5,483	46.6	+46.6
Country hold		Swing	N/A	

=== Mornington ===
1940 Victorian state election: Mornington
Party	Candidate	Votes	%	±%
Country	Alfred Kirton	8,885	69.8	+22.9
United Australia	Harold Smith	3,852	30.2	−22.9
Total formal votes		12,737	98.7	−0.6
Informal votes		174	1.3	+0.6
Turnout		12,911	90.4	−1.9
Country gain from United Australia		Swing	+22.9	

=== Northcote ===
1940 Victorian state election: Northcote
Party	Candidate	Votes	%	±%
Labor	John Cain	17,184	74.4	+3.0
United Australia	Herbert Rasmussen	5,902	25.6	−3.0
Total formal votes		23,086	98.7	−0.4
Informal votes		304	1.3	+0.4
Turnout		23,390	94.7	−0.1
Labor hold		Swing	+3.0	

=== Nunawading ===
1940 Victorian state election: Nunawading
Party	Candidate	Votes	%	±%
United Australia	William Dimmick	8,591	35.7	+5.8
Independent	Ivy Weber	8,368	34.8	+8.2
Labor	Thomas Brennan	7,097	29.5	+5.7
Total formal votes		24,056	98.0	+0.6
Informal votes		492	2.0	−0.6
Turnout		24,548	93.5	−0.6
Two-candidate-preferred result
Independent	Ivy Weber	13,505	56.1	+2.3
United Australia	William Dimmick	10,551	43.9	−2.3
Independent hold		Swing	+2.3	

=== Oakleigh ===
1940 Victorian state election: Oakleigh
Party	Candidate	Votes	%	±%
Labor	Squire Reid	17,451	55.0	+2.7
United Australia	Lyston Chisholm	14,287	45.0	−2.7
Total formal votes		31,738	99.0	−0.2
Informal votes		309	1.0	+0.2
Turnout		32,047	94.6	+0.7
Labor hold		Swing	+2.7	

=== Ouyen ===
1940 Victorian state election: Ouyen
Party	Candidate	Votes	%	±%
Country	Keith Dodgshun	6,786	73.0	−27.0
Independent	Robert Johnstone	2,505	27.0	+27.0
Total formal votes		9,291	98.8	
Informal votes		110	1.2	
Turnout		9,401	93.3	
Country hold		Swing	N/A	

=== Polwarth ===
1940 Victorian state election: Polwarth
Party	Candidate	Votes	%	±%
United Australia	Allan McDonald	6,494	58.4	+2.6
Country	Leonard Parker	4,623	41.6	−2.6
Total formal votes		11,117	99.1	−0.3
Informal votes		98	0.9	+0.3
Turnout		11,215	94.4	−0.8
United Australia hold		Swing	+2.6	

=== Port Fairy and Glenelg ===
1940 Victorian state election: Port Fairy and Glenelg
Party	Candidate	Votes	%	±%
Labor	Ernie Bond	6,899	59.7	+59.7
United Australia	Sydney Patterson	2,509	21.7	+21.7
Country	Robert Rankin	2,137	18.5	+18.5
Total formal votes		11,545	98.7	−0.7
Informal votes		156	1.3	+0.7
Turnout		11,701	95.8	+1.0
Two-party-preferred result
Labor	Ernie Bond		61.5	+61.5
United Australia	Sydney Patterson		38.5	+38.5
Labor gain from Independent		Swing	N/A	

- Ernie Bond had been elected as an Independent in 1937 and joined the Labor party before the election.

=== Port Melbourne ===
1940 Victorian state election: Port Melbourne
Party	Candidate	Votes	%	±%
Labor	James Murphy	unopposed		
Labor hold		Swing		

=== Prahran ===
1940 Victorian state election: Prahran
Party	Candidate	Votes	%	±%
United Australia	John Ellis	12,878	55.8	+0.3
Labor	Roy Cameron	10,193	44.2	−0.3
Total formal votes		23,071	98.2	−0.7
Informal votes		416	1.8	+0.7
Turnout		23,487	90.6	−3.6
United Australia hold		Swing	+0.3	

=== Richmond ===
1940 Victorian state election: Richmond
Party	Candidate	Votes	%	±%
Labor	Ted Cotter	unopposed		
Labor hold		Swing		

=== Rodney ===
1940 Victorian state election: Rodney
Party	Candidate	Votes	%	±%
Country	William Dunstone	6,163	56.1	−43.9
Liberal Country	Archibald McFadyen	4,831	43.9	+43.9
Total formal votes		10,994	98.7	
Informal votes		148	1.3	
Turnout		11,142	92.9	
Country hold		Swing	N/A	

=== St Kilda ===
1940 Victorian state election: St Kilda
Party	Candidate	Votes	%	±%
United Australia	Archie Michaelis	14,885	53.3	−13.4
Independent	Francis Dawkins	13,060	46.7	+46.7
Total formal votes		27,945	98.2	0.0
Informal votes		504	1.8	0.0
Turnout		28,449	92.0	−0.5
United Australia hold		Swing	N/A	

=== Stawell and Ararat ===
1940 Victorian state election: Stawell and Ararat
Party	Candidate	Votes	%	±%
Country	Alec McDonald	5,970	54.1	−45.9
Labor	Stanley Freeland	5,067	45.9	+45.9
Total formal votes		11,037	99.1	
Informal votes		102	0.9	
Turnout		11,139	94.7	
Country hold		Swing	N/A	

=== Swan Hill ===
1940 Victorian state election: Swan Hill
Party	Candidate	Votes	%	±%
Country	Francis Old	5,030	59.2	−5.0
Country	Percy Byrnes	1,776	20.9	−5.1
Country	Launcelot Nind	1,686	19.8	+19.8
Total formal votes		8,492	98.4	−0.2
Informal votes		138	1.6	+0.2
Turnout		8,630	94.0	+0.9
Country hold		Swing	N/A	

- Preferences were not distributed.

=== Toorak ===
1940 Victorian state election: Toorak
Party	Candidate	Votes	%	±%
United Australia	Stanley Argyle	unopposed		
United Australia hold		Swing	N/A	

=== Upper Goulburn ===
1940 Victorian state election: Upper Goulburn
Party	Candidate	Votes	%	±%
Country	Edwin Mackrell	unopposed		
Country hold		Swing		

=== Upper Yarra ===
1940 Victorian state election: Upper Yarra
Party	Candidate	Votes	%	±%
United Australia	George Knox	unopposed		
United Australia hold		Swing		

=== Walhalla ===
1940 Victorian state election: Walhalla
Party	Candidate	Votes	%	±%
Country	William Moncur	unopposed		
Country hold		Swing		

=== Wangaratta and Ovens ===
1940 Victorian state election: Wangaratta and Ovens
Party	Candidate	Votes	%	±%
Country	Lot Diffey	7,700	73.8	−26.2
Liberal Country	Rupert Whalley	2,727	26.2	+26.2
Total formal votes		10,427	98.7	
Informal votes		141	1.3	
Turnout		10,568	92.6	
Country hold		Swing	N/A	

=== Waranga ===
1940 Victorian state election: Waranga
Party	Candidate	Votes	%	±%
Country	Ernest Coyle	unopposed		
Country hold		Swing		

=== Warrenheip and Grenville ===
1940 Victorian state election: Warrenheip and Grenville
Party	Candidate	Votes	%	±%
Country	Edmund Hogan	4,981	51.7	−4.4
Independent	Albert Woodward	3,379	35.1	+35.1
Independent	James Ryan	1,278	13.3	+13.3
Total formal votes		9,638	98.2	+0.6
Informal votes		175	1.8	−0.6
Turnout		9,813	94.4	−1.1
Two-candidate-preferred result
Country	Edmund Hogan		55.0	−1.1
Independent	Albert Woodward		45.0	+45.0
Country hold		Swing	N/A	

- Two candidate preferred vote was estimated.

=== Warrnambool ===
1940 Victorian state election: Warrnambool
Party	Candidate	Votes	%	±%
Country	Henry Bailey	7,557	63.8	+5.8
United Australia	Keith McGarvie	4,284	36.2	−5.8
Total formal votes		11,841	98.9	−0.4
Informal votes		137	1.1	+0.4
Turnout		11,978	95.0	−0.9
Country hold		Swing	+5.8	

=== Williamstown ===
1940 Victorian state election: Williamstown
Party	Candidate	Votes	%	±%
Labor	John Lemmon	13,279	59.3	−1.7
Independent	George Payne	9,119	40.7	+40.7
Total formal votes		22,398	98.7	−0.3
Informal votes		303	1.3	+0.3
Turnout		22,701	93.4	−2.6
Labor hold		Swing	N/A	

=== Wonthaggi ===
1940 Victorian state election: Wonthaggi
Party	Candidate	Votes	%	±%
Labor	William McKenzie	unopposed		
Labor hold		Swing		

== See also ==
- 1940 Victorian state election
- Candidates of the 1940 Victorian state election
- Members of the Victorian Legislative Assembly, 1940–1943
