= Candidates of the 1940 Victorian state election =

The 1940 Victorian state election was held on 16 March 1940.

== Retiring Members ==
=== United Australia ===
- Clive Shields MLA (Castlemaine and Kyneton)

== Legislative Assembly ==
Sitting members are shown in bold text. Successful candidates are highlighted in the relevant colour. Where there is possible confusion, an asterisk (*) is also used.

| Electorate | Held by | Labor candidates | UAP candidates | Country candidates | Other candidates |
|---|---|---|---|---|---|
| Albert Park | UAP | David Casey | **William Haworth** | | |
| Allandale | Labor | **Patrick Denigan** | | Albert Hocking | William Chapman (LCP) |
| Ballarat | UAP | Thomas Jude | **Thomas Hollway** | | |
| Barwon | UAP | | **Thomas Maltby** | | |
| Benalla | Country | | | Manvers Meadows | **Frederick Cook** (LCP) |
| Benambra | Country | | | **Roy Paton** | |
| Bendigo | Labor | **Arthur Cook** | | | |
| Boroondara | UAP | | **Trevor Oldham** | | Reuben Kefford (Ind) |
| Brighton | UAP | | Robert Breen | | **Ian Macfarlan*** (Ind); John Warren (Ind) |
| Brunswick | Labor | **James Jewell** | | | |
| Bulla and Dalhousie | UAP | Charlie Mutton | **Harry White** | John Milligan | |
| Carlton | Labor | **Bill Barry** | David Mandie | | Ralph Gibson (CPA) |
| Castlemaine and Kyneton | UAP | Bill Hodson | Charles Lucas | | |
| Caulfield | UAP | | **Harold Cohen** | | Mary Jones (Ind) |
| Clifton Hill | Labor | **Bert Cremean** | Reginald Archer | | |
| Coburg | Labor | **Frank Keane** | Richard Griffiths | | |
| Collingwood | Labor | **Tom Tunnecliffe** | Frederick Dods | | James Baker (Ind Lab); John Blake (CPA) |
| Dandenong | Labor | **Frank Field** | Leslie Sheppard | | |
| Dundas | Labor | **Bill Slater** | William Ellis | | |
| Essendon | UAP | Arthur Clarey | **James Dillon** | | |
| Evelyn | UAP | | **William Everard** | | |
| Flemington | Labor | **Jack Holland** | Raymond Trickey | | |
| Footscray | Labor | **Jack Mullens** | | | |
| Geelong | Labor | **Fanny Brownbill** | Nathaniel White | | |
| Gippsland East | Country | | | **Albert Lind** | |
| Gippsland North | Country | Albert Ainsworth | | **Alexander Borthwick** | Stephen Ashton (LCP) |
| Gippsland South | Country | | | **Herbert Hyland** | |
| Gippsland West | Country | | | **Matthew Bennett** | Harold Edwards (Ind); Clement McCrostie (LCP) |
| Goulburn Valley | Country | | | **John McDonald** | |
| Grant | UAP | | | | **Frederick Holden** (Ind) |
| Gunbower | Country | | | **Norman Martin** | |
| Hampden | UAP | Walter Kervin | **William Cumming** | Thomas Moore | |
| Hawthorn | UAP | | **Les Tyack** | | Leslie Hollins (Ind) |
| Heidelberg | UAP | James O'Meara | **Henry Zwar** | | |
| Kara Kara and Borung | Country | | | **Finlay Cameron***; Patrick Toohey | John Green (Ind) |
| Kew | UAP | Arthur Kyle | **Wilfrid Kent Hughes** | | |
| Korong and Eaglehawk | Country | | Powley Smith | **Albert Dunstan** | |
| Lowan | Country | | Arthur Bennett | **Hamilton Lamb** | Winton Turnbull (Ind); Marcus Wettenhall (Ind) |
| Maryborough and Daylesford | Labor | **George Frost** | | | |
| Melbourne | Labor | **Tom Hayes** | | | |
| Mildura | Country | | | **Albert Allnutt***; Alfred Rawlings | John Egan (Ind Lab) |
| Mornington | UAP | | Harold Smith | **Alfred Kirton** | |
| Northcote | Labor | **John Cain** | Herbert Rasmussen | | |
| Nunawading | Independent | Thomas Brennan | William Dimmick | | **Ivy Weber** (Ind) |
| Oakleigh | Labor | **Squire Reid** | Lyston Chisholm | | |
| Ouyen | Country | | | **Keith Dodgshun** | Robert Johnstone (Ind) |
| Polwarth | UAP | | **Allan McDonald** | Leonard Parker | |
| Port Fairy and Glenelg | Independent | **Ernie Bond** | Sydney Patterson | Robert Rankin | |
| Port Melbourne | Labor | **James Murphy** | | | |
| Prahran | UAP | Roy Cameron | **John Ellis** | | |
| Richmond | Labor | **Ted Cotter** | | | |
| Rodney | Country | | | **William Dunstone** | Archibald McFadyen (LCP) |
| St Kilda | UAP | | **Archie Michaelis** | | Francis Dawkins (Ind) |
| Stawell and Ararat | Country | Stanley Freeland | | **Alec McDonald** | |
| Swan Hill | Country | | | Percy Byrnes; Launcelot Nind; **Francis Old*** | |
| Toorak | UAP | | **Sir Stanley Argyle** | | |
| Upper Goulburn | Country | | | **Edwin Mackrell** | |
| Upper Yarra | UAP | | **George Knox** | | |
| Walhalla | Country | | | **William Moncur** | |
| Wangaratta and Ovens | Country | | | **Lot Diffey** | Rupert Whalley (LCP) |
| Waranga | Country | | | **Ernest Coyle** | |
| Warrenheip and Grenville | Country | | | **Edmond Hogan** | James Ryan (Ind); Albert Woodward (Ind) |
| Warrnambool | Country | | Keith McGarvie | **Henry Bailey** | |
| Williamstown | Labor | **John Lemmon** | | | George Paine (Ind) |
| Wonthaggi | Labor | **William McKenzie** | | | |

== See also ==
- 1940 Victorian Legislative Council election
