= Electoral results for the district of Benalla =

Australian district election results

This is a list of electoral results for the electoral district of Benalla in Victorian state elections.

== Members for Benalla ==
Member	Party	Term
John Carlisle	Comm Liberal	1904–1917
John Carlisle	Economy	1917–1918
John Carlisle	Nationalist	1918–1920
John Carlisle	Farmers Union	1920–1920
John Carlisle	Country	1920-1926
John Carlisle	Independent	1926–1927
Edward Cleary	Country	1927–1930
Edward Cleary	Country Progressive	1930–1936
Frederick Cook	Independent	1936–1939
Frederick Cook	Liberal Country	1939–1943
Frederick Cook	Country	1943–1961
Tom Trewin	Country	1961–1975
Tom Trewin	National Country	1975–1982
Pat McNamara	National	1982–2000
Denise Allen	Labor	2000–2002
Bill Sykes	National	2002–2014

== Election results ==
=== Elections in the 2010s ===
2010 Victorian state election: Benalla
Party	Candidate	Votes	%	±%
National	Bill Sykes	21,072	63.28	+21.15
Labor	Rowena Allen	6,124	18.39	−6.81
Greens	Kammy Cordner Hunt	2,756	8.28	+1.18
Country Alliance	Rochelle Hunt	2,546	7.65	+7.65
Independent	Nicholas Williams	804	2.41	+2.41
Total formal votes		33,302	95.97	−0.50
Informal votes		1,398	4.03	+0.50
Turnout		34,700	93.82	+0.67
Two-party-preferred result
National	Bill Sykes	24,354	73.06	+5.55
Labor	Rowena Allen	8,978	26.94	−5.55
National hold		Swing	+5.55	

=== Elections in the 2000s ===
2006 Victorian state election: Benalla
Party	Candidate	Votes	%	±%
National	Bill Sykes	13,533	42.1	+15.6
Labor	Rob Mitchell	8,094	25.2	−16.1
Liberal	Hamish McMillan	7,396	23.0	−3.1
Greens	Kammy Cordner Hunt	2,282	7.1	+0.9
Family First	James A. Rainey	819	2.5	+2.5
Total formal votes		32,124	96.4	−1.2
Informal votes		1,211	3.6	+1.2
Turnout		33,335	93.1	
Two-party-preferred result
National	Bill Sykes	21,687	67.5	+15.5
Labor	Rob Mitchell	10,437	32.5	−15.5
National hold		Swing	+15.5	

2002 Victorian state election: Benalla
Party	Candidate	Votes	%	±%
Labor	Denise Allen	13,129	41.3	−1.8
National	Bill Sykes	8,414	26.5	−26.3
Liberal	Andrew Dwyer	8,306	26.1	+22.3
Greens	Peter Stewart	1,961	6.2	+6.1
Total formal votes		31,810	97.6	+1.0
Informal votes		791	2.4	−1.0
Turnout		32,601	94.0	+1.0
Two-party-preferred result
National	Bill Sykes	16,531	52.0	−4.7
Labor	Denise Allen	15,279	48.0	+4.7
National gain from Labor		Swing	−4.7	

2000 Benalla state by-election
Party	Candidate	Votes	%	±%
Labor	Denise Allen	12,514	42.07	−0.52
National	Bill Sykes	12,244	41.16	−16.25
Independent	Geoff Rowe	2,072	6.97	+6.97
Independent	Bill Hill	1,983	6.67	+6.67
Greens	Janet Mackenzie	597	2.01	+2.01
Independent	Maurie Smith	234	0.79	+0.79
Reform	Alf Thorpe	101	0.34	+0.34
Total formal votes		29,745	97.22	+0.79
Informal votes		849	2.78	–0.79
Turnout		30,594	89.60	−3.35
Two-party-preferred result
Labor	Denise Allen	14,991	50.40	+7.81
National	Bill Sykes	14,754	49.60	−7.81
Labor gain from National		Swing	7.81	

=== Elections in the 1990s ===
1999 Victorian state election: Benalla
Party	Candidate	Votes	%	±%
National	Pat McNamara	17,543	57.4	−7.9
Labor	Denise Allen	13,013	42.6	+7.9
Total formal votes		30,556	96.4	−1.6
Informal votes		1,128	3.6	+1.6
Turnout		31,684	93.0	−1.9
National hold		Swing	−7.9	

1996 Victorian state election: Benalla
Party	Candidate	Votes	%	±%
National	Pat McNamara	18,055	58.9	−9.3
Labor	Zuvele Leschen	7,250	23.6	−3.2
Independent	Bill Hill	4,711	15.4	+15.4
Independent	Brian Lumsden	382	1.2	−3.8
Natural Law	James Charlwood	275	0.9	+0.9
Total formal votes		30,673	98.1	+0.3
Informal votes		601	1.9	−0.3
Turnout		31,274	94.9	−0.9
Two-party-preferred result
National	Pat McNamara	19,969	65.3	−5.5
Labor	Zuvele Leschen	10,628	34.7	+5.5
National hold		Swing	−5.5	

1992 Victorian state election: Benalla
Party	Candidate	Votes	%	±%
National	Pat McNamara	20,306	68.2	+25.8
Labor	Anne Cox	7,984	26.8	−0.3
Independent	Brian Lumsden	1,491	5.0	+5.0
Total formal votes		29,781	97.7	−0.2
Informal votes		686	2.3	+0.2
Turnout		30,467	95.8	
Two-party-preferred result
National	Pat McNamara	21,085	70.8	+0.2
Labor	Anne Cox	8,687	29.2	−0.2
National hold		Swing	+0.2	

=== Elections in the 1980s ===
1988 Victorian state election: Benalla
Party	Candidate	Votes	%	±%
National	Pat McNamara	12,004	42.54	−4.88
Labor	Barbara Stepan	8,394	29.75	−2.71
Liberal	Margaret Stribling	6,333	22.44	+2.32
Independent	Grant Triffett	909	3.22	+3.22
Call to Australia	Win Wise	576	2.04	+2.04
Total formal votes		28,216	97.76	−0.59
Informal votes		646	2.24	+0.59
Turnout		28,862	92.36	−0.25
Two-party-preferred result
National	Pat McNamara	19,173	67.95	+1.86
Labor	Barbara Stepan	9,043	32.05	−1.86
National hold		Swing	+1.86	

1985 Victorian state election: Benalla
Party	Candidate	Votes	%	±%
National	Pat McNamara	13,031	47.4	+13.4
Labor	Grant Triffett	8,922	32.5	−1.7
Liberal	Leonard Crocombe	5,529	20.1	−7.7
Total formal votes		27,482	98.3	
Informal votes		460	1.7	
Turnout		27,942	92.6	
Two-party-preferred result
National	Pat McNamara	18,163	66.1	+3.2
Labor	Grant Triffett	9,319	33.9	−3.2
National hold		Swing	+3.2	

1982 Victorian state election: Benalla
Party	Candidate	Votes	%	±%
National	Pat McNamara	9,027	36.7	−5.6
Labor	James Ure	8,291	33.7	+0.8
Liberal	Andrew Mein	6,303	25.6	+0.7
Democrats	Rita Dart	975	4.0	+4.0
Total formal votes		24,596	98.5	+0.7
Informal votes		382	1.5	−0.7
Turnout		24,978	93.5	+0.1
Two-party-preferred result
National	Pat McNamara	15,593	63.4	−2.0
Labor	James Ure	9,003	36.6	+2.0
National hold		Swing	−2.0	

=== Elections in the 1970s ===
1979 Victorian state election: Benalla
Party	Candidate	Votes	%	±%
National	Tom Trewin	9,991	42.3	−1.8
Labor	Brian Cousins	7,768	32.9	+6.0
Liberal	Alan Jones	5,883	24.9	+2.4
Total formal votes		23,642	97.8	−0.6
Informal votes		522	2.2	+0.6
Turnout		24,164	93.4	−0.4
Two-party-preferred result
National	Tom Trewin	15,460	65.4	−4.7
Labor	Brian Cousins	8,182	34.6	+4.7
National hold		Swing	−4.7	

1976 Victorian state election: Benalla
Party	Candidate	Votes	%	±%
National	Tom Trewin	10,160	44.1	+10.7
Labor	John Dennis	6,205	26.9	−3.6
Liberal	Leo Gorman	5,188	22.5	−3.9
Democratic Labor	Christopher Cody	1,495	6.5	−3.0
Total formal votes		23,048	98.4	
Informal votes		378	1.6	
Turnout		23,426	93.8	
Two-party-preferred result
National	Tom Trewin	16,156	70.1	+3.9
Labor	John Dennis	6,892	29.9	−3.9
National hold		Swing	+3.9	

1973 Victorian state election: Benalla
Party	Candidate	Votes	%	±%
Country	Tom Trewin	8,990	48.8	+2.7
Labor	James Scott	4,236	23.0	+1.2
Liberal	Vernon Dawson	3,209	17.4	−2.8
Democratic Labor	Christopher Cody	1,971	10.7	−1.2
Total formal votes		18,406	97.6	+0.1
Informal votes		449	2.4	−0.1
Turnout		18,855	94.8	−1.1
Two-party-preferred result
Country	Tom Trewin	13,705	74.5	−0.9
Labor	James Scott	4,701	25.5	+0.9
Country hold		Swing	−0.9	

1970 Victorian state election: Benalla
Party	Candidate	Votes	%	±%
Country	Tom Trewin	7,981	46.1	−6.0
Labor	John Coutts	3,762	21.8	+2.9
Liberal	Dulcie Brack	3,503	20.2	+3.0
Democratic Labor	Christopher Cody	2,053	11.9	+0.1
Total formal votes		17,299	97.5	−0.1
Informal votes		438	2.5	+0.1
Turnout		17,737	95.9	−0.2
Two-party-preferred result
Country	Tom Trewin	13,043	75.4	−2.2
Labor	John Coutts	4,256	24.6	+2.2
Two-candidate-preferred result
Country	Tom Trewin	9,399	54.3	−23.3
Liberal	Dulcie Brack	7,900	45.7	+45.7
Country hold		Swing	−2.2	

=== Elections in the 1960s ===
1967 Victorian state election: Benalla
Party	Candidate	Votes	%	±%
Country	Tom Trewin	8,761	52.1	−8.0
Labor	Nathanial Robertson	3,179	18.9	+18.9
Liberal	Ian Bayles	2,898	17.2	−5.7
Democratic Labor	Christopher Cody	1,989	11.8	−5.2
Total formal votes		16,827	97.6	
Informal votes		412	2.4	
Turnout		17,239	96.1	
Two-party-preferred result
Country	Tom Trewin	13,059	77.6	+14.1
Labor	Nathanial Robertson	3,768	22.4	+22.4
Country hold		Swing	+14.1	

1964 Victorian state election: Benalla
Party	Candidate	Votes	%	±%
Country	Tom Trewin	11,713	59.4	+23.6
Liberal and Country	Ewen Cameron	4,872	24.7	+5.3
Democratic Labor	Christopher Cody	3,151	16.0	+0.6
Total formal votes		19,736	98.3	+0.3
Informal votes		338	1.7	−0.3
Turnout		20,074	95.2	−3.6
Two-candidate-preferred result
Country	Tom Trewin	12,343	62.5	−4.5
Liberal and Country	Ewen Cameron	7,393	37.5	+37.5
Country hold		Swing	−4.5	

1961 Victorian state election: Benalla
Party	Candidate	Votes	%	±%
Country	Tom Trewin	7,007	35.8	+1.6
Labor	Jack Ginifer	5,758	29.5	+1.0
Liberal and Country	John Hanson	3,785	19.4	−4.6
Democratic Labor	Bartholomew O'Dea	3,000	15.4	+2.0
Total formal votes		19,550	98.0	−1.0
Informal votes		394	2.0	+1.0
Turnout		19,944	98.8	+4.0
Two-party-preferred result
Country	Tom Trewin	13,102	67.0	−0.1
Labor	Jack Ginifer	6,448	33.0	+0.1
Country hold		Swing	−0.1	

=== Elections in the 1950s ===
1958 Victorian state election: Benalla
Party	Candidate	Votes	%	±%
Country	Frederick Cook	6,628	34.2	
Labor	Jack Ginifer	5,520	28.5	
Liberal and Country	James Bennison	4,651	24.0	
Democratic Labor	William Mithen	2,604	13.4	
Total formal votes		19,403	99.0	
Informal votes		188	1.0	
Turnout		19,591	94.8	
Two-party-preferred result
Country	Frederick Cook	13,028	67.1	
Labor	Jack Ginifer	6,375	32.9	
Two-candidate-preferred result
Country	Frederick Cook	11,810	60.9	
Liberal and Country	James Bennison	7,593	39.1	
Country hold		Swing		

1955 Victorian state election: Benalla
Party	Candidate	Votes	%	±%
Country	Frederick Cook	7,589	38.8	
Labor (A-C)	Ernest Straughair	6,028	30.8	
Liberal and Country	Jack Pennington	5,949	30.4	
Total formal votes		19,566	97.9	
Informal votes		423	2.1	
Turnout		19,989	94.7	
Two-candidate-preferred result
Country	Frederick Cook	12,804	65.4	
Labor (A-C)	Ernest Straughair	6,762	34.6	
Country hold		Swing		

1952 Victorian state election: Benalla
Party	Candidate	Votes	%	±%
Country	Frederick Cook	unopposed		
Country hold		Swing		

1950 Victorian state election: Benalla
Party	Candidate	Votes	%	±%
Country	Frederick Cook	7,466	59.1	−8.2
Liberal and Country	Jack Pennington	5,174	40.9	+8.2
Total formal votes		12,640	97.3	+1.0
Informal votes		348	2.7	−1.0
Turnout		12,988	94.2	+1.2
Country hold		Swing	−8.2	

=== Elections in the 1940s ===
1947 Victorian state election: Benalla
Party	Candidate	Votes	%	±%
Country	Frederick Cook	8,141	67.3	+12.6
Liberal	Thomas Nolan	3,955	32.7	+32.7
Total formal votes		12,096	96.3	−1.2
Informal votes		467	3.7	+1.2
Turnout		12,563	93.0	+4.2
Country hold		Swing	N/A	

1945 Victorian state election: Benalla
Party	Candidate	Votes	%	±%
Country	Frederick Cook	6,125	54.7	
Country	Percy Johnson	5,077	45.3	
Total formal votes		11,202	97.5	
Informal votes		288	2.5	
Turnout		11,490	88.8	
Country hold		Swing		

1943 Victorian state election: Benalla
Party	Candidate	Votes	%	±%
Country	Frederick Cook	3,779	40.2	−14.8
Labor	Andrew McIntosh	3,109	33.0	+33.0
Country	Percy Johnson	2,520	26.8	+26.8
Total formal votes		9,408	99.1	+0.2
Informal votes		83	0.9	−0.2
Turnout		9,491	87.3	−4.6
Two-party-preferred result
Country	Frederick Cook	5,649	60.0	+15.0
Labor	Andrew McIntosh	3,759	40.0	+40.0
Country gain from Liberal Country		Swing	N/A	

1940 Victorian state election: Benalla
Party	Candidate	Votes	%	±%
Liberal Country	Frederick Cook	5,592	55.0	+55.0
Country	Manvers Meadows	4,580	45.0	+19.2
Total formal votes		10,172	98.9	0.0
Informal votes		115	1.1	0.0
Turnout		10,287	91.9	−3.1
Liberal Country gain from Independent		Swing	N/A	

=== Elections in the 1930s ===
1937 Victorian state election: Benalla
Party	Candidate	Votes	%	±%
Independent	Frederick Cook	4,126	38.5	+38.5
Labor	Jack Devlin	3,836	35.8	+35.8
Country	Mervyn Huggins	2,762	25.8	−74.2
Total formal votes		10,724	98.9	
Informal votes		117	1.1	
Turnout		10,841	95.0	
Two-candidate-preferred result
Independent	Frederick Cook	5,806	54.1	+54.1
Labor	Jack Devlin	4,918	45.9	+45.9
Independent gain from Country		Swing	N/A	

1936 Benalla state by-election
Party	Candidate	Votes	%	±%
Country	Michael Cleary	2,715	28.2	
Independent	Frederick Cook	2,452	25.4	
Country	Malachy Ryan	1,337	13.9	
Country	Henry Hill	1,057	11.0	
Country	Arthur Harrison	1,052	10.9	
Country	William Tonkin	1,030	10.7	
Total formal votes		9,643	97.0	
Informal votes		302	3.0	
Turnout		9,945	90.4	
Two-candidate-preferred result
Independent	Frederick Cook	5,006	51.9	
Country	Michael Cleary	4,637	48.1	
Independent gain from Country		Swing	N/A	

1935 Victorian state election: Benalla
Party	Candidate	Votes	%	±%
Country	Edward Clearly	unopposed		
Country hold		Swing		

1932 Victorian state election: Benalla
Party	Candidate	Votes	%	±%
Country	Edward Cleary	unopposed		
Country hold		Swing		

=== Elections in the 1920s ===
1929 Victorian state election: Benalla
Party	Candidate	Votes	%	±%
Country Progressive	Edward Cleary	5,327	56.4	+17.7
Country	Patrick Connell	4,123	43.6	+18.6
Total formal votes		9,450	99.1	+1.3
Informal votes		87	0.9	−1.3
Turnout		9,537	94.5	+1.8
Country Progressive hold		Swing	N/A	

1927 Victorian state election: Benalla
Party	Candidate	Votes	%	±%
Country Progressive	Edward Cleary	3,406	38.7	
Independent	John Carlisle	3,201	36.3	
Country	Patrick Connell	2,200	25.0	
Total formal votes		8,807	97.8	
Informal votes		203	2.2	
Turnout		9,010	92.7	
Two-candidate-preferred result
Country Progressive	Edward Cleary	4,413	50.1	
Independent	John Carlisle	4,394	49.9	
Country Progressive gain from Country		Swing	N/A	

1924 Victorian state election: Benalla
Party	Candidate	Votes	%	±%
Country	John Carlisle	2,397	61.6	−3.2
Nationalist	Alexander Mitchell	1,494	38.4	+3.2
Total formal votes		3,891	99.5	+0.7
Informal votes		19	0.5	−0.7
Turnout		3,910	55.0	−2.4
Country hold		Swing	−3.2	

1921 Victorian state election: Benalla
Party	Candidate	Votes	%	±%
Victorian Farmers	John Carlisle	2,912	64.8	−1.2
Nationalist	Alfred Manning	1,582	35.2	+1.2
Total formal votes		4,494	98.8	+3.3
Informal votes		55	1.2	−3.3
Turnout		4,549	57.4	−1.9
Victorian Farmers hold		Swing	−1.2	

1920 Victorian state election: Benalla
Party	Candidate	Votes	%	±%
Victorian Farmers	John Carlisle	2,937	66.0	+66.0
Nationalist	Robert Lewers	1,512	34.0	−28.3
Total formal votes		4,449	95.5	−1.8
Informal votes		208	4.5	+1.8
Turnout		4,657	59.3	−4.0
Victorian Farmers gain from Nationalist		Swing	N/A	

- John Carlisle was the sitting Nationalist MP for Benalla, but changed to the Victorian Farmers Union before this election.

=== Elections in the 1910s ===
1917 Victorian state election: Benalla
Party	Candidate	Votes	%	±%
Nationalist	John Carlisle	2,688	55.1	−11.3
Labor	Laurence Corboy	1,840	37.7	+4.1
Nationalist	Thomas Kennedy	353	7.2	+7.2
Total formal votes		4,881	97.3	−0.7
Informal votes		139	2.7	+0.7
Turnout		5,020	63.3	+10.4
Two-party-preferred result
Nationalist	John Carlisle		61.6	−4.8
Labor	Laurence Corboy		38.4	+4.8
Nationalist hold		Swing	−4.8	

- Two party preferred vote was estimated.

1914 Victorian state election: Benalla
Party	Candidate	Votes	%	±%
Liberal	John Carlisle	2,785	66.4	−6.4
Labor	Ebenezer Brown	1,411	33.6	+6.4
Total formal votes		4,196	98.0	−0.8
Informal votes		84	2.0	+0.8
Turnout		4,280	52.9	−9.2
Liberal hold		Swing	−6.4	

1911 Victorian state election: Benalla
Party	Candidate	Votes	%	±%
Liberal	John Carlisle	3,437	72.8	+11.3
Labor	Gerald Stanley	1,285	27.2	+27.2
Total formal votes		4,722	98.8	−0.8
Informal votes		57	1.2	+0.8
Turnout		4,779	62.1	+17.4
Liberal hold		Swing	N/A	
