= Electoral results for the district of Mornington =

Victoria, Australia, district election results

This is a list of electoral results for the Electoral district of Mornington in Victorian state elections.

== Members for Mornington ==
First incarnation (1859–1967)
Member	Party	Term
William Lyall	Unaligned	1859–1861
Henry Samuel Chapman	Unaligned	1861–1862
Sir James McCulloch	Unaligned	1862–1872
James Purves	Unaligned	1872–1880
James Gibb	Unaligned	1880–1886
Louis Smith	Unaligned	1886–1894
Alfred Downward	Unaligned	1894–1929
Herbert Downward	Country	1929–1932
Alfred Kirton	United Australia	1932–1947
Alfred Kirton	Country	1932–1947
William Leggatt	Liberal	1947–1956
Roberts Dunstan	Liberal	1956–1967
Second incarnation (1985–present)
Member	Party	Term
Robin Cooper	Liberal	1985–2006
David Morris	Liberal	2006–2022
Chris Crewther	Liberal	2022–present

== Election results ==
=== Elections in the 2020s ===
2022 Victorian state election: Mornington
Party	Candidate	Votes	%	±%
Liberal	Chris Crewther	17,910	42.58	−8.01
Independent	Kate Lardner	9,432	22.42	+22.42
Labor	Georgia Fowler	9,246	21.98	−12.30
Greens	Harry Sinclair	2,677	6.38	−3.42
Freedom	Paul Pettitt	1,041	2.47	+2.47
Animal Justice	Leonie Schween	740	1.76	−3.57
Independent	Jane Agirtan	641	1.52	+1.52
Family First	Ross Hayward	375	0.89	+0.89
Total formal votes		42,062	95.85	+0.38
Informal votes		1,823	4.15	−0.38
Turnout		43,885	91.34	−0.64
Notional two-party-preferred count
Liberal	Chris Crewther	24,514	58.28	+3.28
Labor	Georgia Fowler	17,548	41.72	−3.28
Two-candidate-preferred result
Liberal	Chris Crewther	21,326	50.70	−4.30
Independent	Kate Lardner	20,736	49.30	+49.30
Liberal hold		Swing	N/A	

=== Elections in the 2010s ===
2018 Victorian state election: Mornington
Party	Candidate	Votes	%	±%
Liberal	David Morris	20,963	50.59	−8.20
Labor	Ryan White	14,204	34.28	+6.99
Greens	David Sinclair	4,060	9.80	−1.91
Animal Justice	Tyson Jack	2,208	5.33	+5.33
Total formal votes		41,435	95.47	−0.49
Informal votes		1,964	4.53	+0.49
Turnout		43,399	91.98	−2.22
Two-party-preferred result
Liberal	David Morris	22,775	55.00	−7.61
Labor	Ryan White	18,638	45.01	+7.61
Liberal hold		Swing	−7.61	

2014 Victorian state election: Mornington
Party	Candidate	Votes	%	±%
Liberal	David Morris	23,184	58.8	−2.8
Labor	Rebecca Wright	10,762	27.3	+2.2
Greens	Matthew McLaren	4,618	11.7	+1.2
Rise Up Australia	Peter Moldovan	453	1.2	+1.1
Country Alliance	Marion Barnes	416	1.1	−0.1
Total formal votes		39,433	96.0	−0.2
Informal votes		1,660	4.0	+0.2
Turnout		41,093	94.2	+2.9
Two-party-preferred result
Liberal	David Morris	24,711	62.6	−3.6
Labor	Rebecca Wright	14,759	37.4	+3.6
Liberal hold		Swing	−3.6	

2010 Victorian state election: Mornington
Party	Candidate	Votes	%	±%
Liberal	David Morris	22,238	61.44	+5.67
Labor	James Dooley	9,119	25.19	−2.99
Greens	Martin Rush	3,823	10.56	+0.43
Independent	Matt Taylor	606	1.67	+1.67
Country Alliance	Stephen Schafer	411	1.14	+1.14
Total formal votes		36,197	96.11	−0.40
Informal votes		1,464	3.89	+0.40
Turnout		37,661	93.70	+0.33
Two-party-preferred result
Liberal	David Morris	23,915	66.03	+4.18
Labor	James Dooley	12,305	33.97	−4.18
Liberal hold		Swing	+4.18	

=== Elections in the 2000s ===
2006 Victorian state election: Mornington
Party	Candidate	Votes	%	±%
Liberal	David Morris	18,561	55.8	+6.4
Labor	William Puls	9,379	28.2	−11.1
Greens	Malcolm Jones	3,370	10.1	−1.3
Family First	Thea Clarke	1,083	3.3	+3.3
People Power	Mark Fleming	890	2.7	+2.7
Total formal votes		33,283	96.5	−1.2
Informal votes		1,203	3.5	+1.2
Turnout		34,486	93.4	
Two-party-preferred result
Liberal	David Morris	20,582	61.9	+10.1
Labor	William Puls	12,695	38.1	−10.1
Liberal hold		Swing	+10.1	

2002 Victorian state election: Mornington
Party	Candidate	Votes	%	±%
Liberal	Robin Cooper	15,608	49.4	−10.0
Labor	Judith Graley	12,424	39.3	+8.5
Greens	Paula Johnson	3,591	11.4	+9.2
Total formal votes		31,623	97.7	−0.3
Informal votes		730	2.3	+0.3
Turnout		32,353	93.7	
Two-party-preferred result
Liberal	Robin Cooper	16,388	51.8	−10.0
Labor	Judith Graley	15,235	48.2	+10.0
Liberal hold		Swing	−10.0	

=== Elections in the 1990s ===
1999 Victorian state election: Mornington
Party	Candidate	Votes	%	±%
Liberal	Robin Cooper	17,821	53.0	−6.2
Labor	Gwen Cornelius	12,198	36.3	−0.8
Independent	Vivienne Nicholson	2,816	8.4	+8.4
Independent	Snez Plunkett	783	2.3	+2.3
Total formal votes		33,618	97.6	−0.4
Informal votes		813	2.4	+0.4
Turnout		34,431	93.5	
Two-party-preferred result
Liberal	Robin Cooper	18,733	55.7	−5.6
Labor	Gwen Cornelius	14,880	44.3	+5.6
Liberal hold		Swing	−5.6	

1996 Victorian state election: Mornington
Party	Candidate	Votes	%	±%
Liberal	Robin Cooper	18,291	59.2	−0.6
Labor	Dean Fletcher	11,467	37.1	+4.1
Natural Law	Suzanne Edwards	1,125	3.6	−3.5
Total formal votes		30,883	98.1	+1.3
Informal votes		610	1.9	−1.3
Turnout		31,493	93.9	
Two-party-preferred result
Liberal	Robin Cooper	18,908	61.3	−1.6
Labor	Dean Fletcher	11,954	38.7	+1.6
Liberal hold		Swing	−1.6	

1992 Victorian state election: Mornington
Party	Candidate	Votes	%	±%
Liberal	Robin Cooper	16,760	59.8	+10.4
Labor	Carlyle La'Brooy	9,262	33.0	−10.8
Natural Law	Jan Charlwood	2,015	7.2	+7.2
Total formal votes		28,037	96.7	+0.0
Informal votes		944	3.3	−0.0
Turnout		28,981	95.2	
Two-party-preferred result
Liberal	Robin Cooper	17,620	62.9	+11.6
Labor	Carlyle La'Brooy	10,406	37.1	−11.6
Liberal hold		Swing	+11.6	

=== Elections in the 1980s ===
1988 Victorian state election: Mornington
Party	Candidate	Votes	%	±%
Liberal	Robin Cooper	16,363	49.93	−2.06
Labor	Barry Smith	14,017	42.77	−5.24
Democrats	Peter Carroll	2,393	7.30	+7.30
Total formal votes		32,773	96.77	−0.95
Informal votes		1,093	3.23	+0.95
Turnout		33,866	92.49	+0.11
Two-party-preferred result
Liberal	Robin Cooper	17,050	52.03	+0.04
Labor	Barry Smith	15,719	47.97	−0.04
Liberal hold		Swing	+0.04	

1985 Victorian state election: Mornington
Party	Candidate	Votes	%	±%
Liberal	Robin Cooper	14,376	52.0	+7.6
Labor	David Hassett	13,275	48.0	+3.8
Total formal votes		27,651	97.7	
Informal votes		644	2.3	
Turnout		28,295	92.4	
Liberal gain from Labor		Swing	+3.4	

=== Elections in the 1960s ===
1964 Victorian state election: Mornington
Party	Candidate	Votes	%	±%
Liberal and Country	Roberts Dunstan	17,629	57.8	+0.3
Labor	Ken Stafford	8,678	28.5	+1.9
Democratic Labor	John Cass	4,196	13.8	−2.1
Total formal votes		30,503	98.0	−0.3
Informal votes		626	2.0	+0.3
Turnout		31,129	92.8	−0.4
Two-party-preferred result
Liberal and Country	Roberts Dunstan	21,195	69.5	−1.6
Labor	Ken Stafford	9,308	30.5	+1.6
Liberal and Country hold		Swing	−1.6	

1961 Victorian state election: Mornington
Party	Candidate	Votes	%	±%
Liberal and Country	Roberts Dunstan	14,856	57.5	−6.0
Labor	Brian Pigott	6,854	26.6	−9.9
Democratic Labor	John Cass	4,108	15.9	+15.9
Total formal votes		25,818	98.3	−0.1
Informal votes		455	1.7	+0.1
Turnout		26,273	93.2	+0.2
Two-party-preferred result
Liberal and Country	Roberts Dunstan	18,148	71.1	+7.6
Labor	Brian Pigott	7,670	28.9	−7.6
Liberal and Country hold		Swing	+7.6	

=== Elections in the 1950s ===
1958 Victorian state election: Mornington
Party	Candidate	Votes	%	±%
Liberal and Country	Roberts Dunstan	13,728	63.5	
Labor	Gordon Anstee	7,897	36.5	
Total formal votes		21,625	98.4	
Informal votes		341	1.6	
Turnout		21,966	93.0	
Liberal and Country hold		Swing		

1956 Mornington state by-election
Party	Candidate	Votes	%	±%
Liberal and Country	Roberts Dunstan	14,091	65.2	0.0
Labor	Harold Thornell	7,523	34.8	+34.8
Total formal votes		21,614	98.9	+2.7
Informal votes		232	1.1	−2.7
Turnout		21,846	83.4	−9.1
Liberal and Country hold		Swing	N/A	

1955 Victorian state election: Mornington
Party	Candidate	Votes	%	±%
Liberal and Country	William Leggatt	14,327	65.2	
Victorian Liberal	Fred Jarman	7,646	34.8	
Total formal votes		21,973	96.2	
Informal votes		870	3.8	
Turnout		28,843	92.5	
Liberal and Country hold		Swing		

1952 Victorian state election: Mornington
Party	Candidate	Votes	%	±%
Labor	Norman Parker	7,970	41.2	+13.6
Liberal and Country	William Leggatt	7,162	37.0	−22.5
Electoral Reform	Gerard Hirst	2,918	15.1	+15.1
Independent	Morton Moyes	1,317	6.8	+6.8
Total formal votes		19,367	98.2	−0.8
Informal votes		350	1.8	+0.8
Turnout		19,717	93.0	0.0
Two-party-preferred result
Liberal and Country	William Leggatt	10,858	56.1	−13.7
Labor	Norman Parker	8,509	43.9	+13.7
Liberal and Country hold		Swing	−13.7	

1950 Victorian state election: Mornington
Party	Candidate	Votes	%	±%
Liberal and Country	William Leggatt	9,847	59.5	+6.6
Labor	Alexander Higgins	4,566	27.6	−1.3
Independent	Albert Allnutt	2,133	12.9	+12.9
Total formal votes		16,546	99.0	0.0
Informal votes		170	1.0	0.0
Turnout		16,716	93.0	+1.5
Two-party-preferred result
Liberal and Country	William Leggatt	11,554	69.8	+0.6
Labor	Alexander Higgins	4,992	30.2	−0.6
Liberal and Country hold		Swing	+0.6	

=== Elections in the 1940s ===
1947 Victorian state election: Mornington
Party	Candidate	Votes	%	±%
Liberal	William Leggatt	7,854	52.9	+7.4
Labor	Bertram Maslen	4,292	28.9	+28.9
Country	Eric Rundle	2,692	18.1	−36.4
Total formal votes		14,838	99.0	+1.9
Informal votes		144	1.0	−1.9
Liberal gain from Country		Swing	N/A	

- Preferences were not distributed.

1945 Victorian state election: Mornington
Party	Candidate	Votes	%	±%
Country	Alfred Kirton	6,205	54.5	
Liberal	Frank Sharpe	5,188	45.5	
Total formal votes		11,393	97.1	
Informal votes		337	2.9	
Turnout		11,730	83.8	
Country hold		Swing		

1943 Victorian state election: Mornington
Party	Candidate	Votes	%	±%
Country	Alfred Kirton	unopposed		
Country hold		Swing		

1940 Victorian state election: Mornington
Party	Candidate	Votes	%	±%
Country	Alfred Kirton	8,885	69.8	+22.9
United Australia	Harold Smith	3,852	30.2	−22.9
Total formal votes		12,737	98.7	−0.6
Informal votes		174	1.3	+0.6
Turnout		12,911	90.4	−1.9
Country gain from United Australia		Swing	+22.9	

=== Elections in the 1930s ===
1937 Victorian state election: Mornington
Party	Candidate	Votes	%	±%
United Australia	Alfred Kirton	6,554	53.1	+0.6
Country	George Bowden	5,780	46.9	−0.6
Total formal votes		12,334	99.3	+0.8
Informal votes		86	0.7	−0.8
Turnout		12,420	92.3	−0.6
United Australia hold		Swing	+0.6	

1935 Victorian state election: Mornington
Party	Candidate	Votes	%	±%
United Australia	Alfred Kirton	6,361	52.5	+1.1
Country	George Bowden	5,758	47.5	+10.7
Total formal votes		12,119	98.5	−0.3
Informal votes		179	1.5	+0.3
Turnout		12,298	92.9	+2.1
United Australia hold		Swing	−4.8	

1932 Victorian state election: Mornington
Party	Candidate	Votes	%	±%
United Australia	Alfred Kirton	5,833	51.4	+8.0
Country	Herbert Downward	4,181	36.8	+8.7
Labor	John Graham	1,338	11.8	−13.0
Total formal votes		11,352	98.8	+0.4
Informal votes		136	1.2	−0.4
Turnout		11,488	90.8	−0.8
United Australia gain from Country		Swing	N/A	

- Preferences were not distributed.

=== Elections in the 1920s ===
1929 Victorian state election: Mornington
Party	Candidate	Votes	%	±%
Nationalist	Alfred Kirton	4,531	43.4	+6.3
Country	Herbert Downward	2,933	28.1	−14.4
Labor	John Jack	2,587	24.8	+24.8
Independent	Joseph Burch	381	3.6	+3.6
Total formal votes		10,432	98.4	+1.0
Informal votes		168	1.6	−1.0
Turnout		10,600	91.6	+2.4
Two-candidate-preferred result
Country	Herbert Downward	5,364	51.4	−2.2
Nationalist	Alfred Kirton	5,068	48.6	+2.2
Country hold		Swing	−2.2	

1927 Victorian state election: Mornington
Party	Candidate	Votes	%	±%
Country	Alfred Downward	3,884	42.5	
Nationalist	Alfred Kirton	3,388	37.1	
Australian Liberal	Cyril Croskell	1,866	20.4	
Total formal votes		9,138	97.4	
Informal votes		248	2.6	
Turnout		9,386	89.2	
Two-candidate-preferred result
Country	Alfred Downward	4,898	53.6	
Nationalist	Alfred Kirton	4,240	46.4	
Country hold		Swing		

1924 Victorian state election: Mornington
Party	Candidate	Votes	%	±%
Labor	William Dowling	3,733	41.2	+41.2
Country	Alfred Downward	2,298	25.4	−22.0
Nationalist	Frederick Hagelthorn	1,019	11.2	−20.6
Country	Milton Wettenhall	843	9.3	+9.3
Independent	William Easton	820	9.0	+9.0
Independent	Percy Thompson	347	3.8	+3.8
Total formal votes		9,060	96.5	−1.0
Informal votes		328	3.5	+1.0
Turnout		9,388	55.0	+7.1
Two-party-preferred result
Country	Alfred Downward	4,865	53.7	+1.6
Labor	William Dowling	4,195	46.3	+46.3
Country hold		Swing	N/A	

1921 Victorian state election: Mornington
Party	Candidate	Votes	%	±%
Victorian Farmers	Alfred Downward	3,485	47.4	−12.7
Nationalist	William Cook	2,333	31.8	−8.1
Ind. Nationalist	Albert Sambell	1,526	20.8	+20.8
Total formal votes		7,344	97.5	+3.3
Informal votes		192	2.5	−3.3
Turnout		7,536	47.9	−8.7
Two-candidate-preferred result
Victorian Farmers	Alfred Downward	3,827	52.1	−8.0
Nationalist	Arthur Leadbeater	3,356	39.9	+8.0
Victorian Farmers hold		Swing	−8.0	

1920 Victorian state election: Mornington
Party	Candidate	Votes	%	±%
Victorian Farmers	Alfred Downward	5,062	60.1	
Nationalist	Arthur Leadbeater	3,356	39.9	
Total formal votes		8,418	94.2	−2.6
Informal votes		517	5.8	+2.6
Turnout		8,935	56.6	+14.3
Victorian Farmers gain from Nationalist		Swing	N/A	

- Alfred Downward was the sitting Nationalist MP for Mornington, but changed to the Victorian Farmers Union before this election.

=== Elections in the 1910s ===
1917 Victorian state election: Mornington
Party	Candidate	Votes	%	±%
Nationalist	Alfred Downward	3,373	55.5	
Nationalist	Robert Anderson	2,701	44.5	
Total formal votes		6,074	96.8	+0.3
Informal votes		200	3.2	−0.3
Turnout		6,274	42.3	−2.5
Nationalist hold		Swing	N/A	

1914 Victorian state election: Mornington
Party	Candidate	Votes	%	±%
Liberal	Alfred Downward	3,735	63.0	+16.0
Labor	Francis Murphy	2,193	37.0	+1.2
Total formal votes		5,928	96.5	−1.9
Informal votes		213	3.5	+1.9
Turnout		6,141	44.8	−16.2
Liberal hold		Swing	+0.3	

1911 Victorian state election: Mornington
Party	Candidate	Votes	%	±%
Liberal	Alfred Downward	3,643	47.0	N/A
Labor	Francis Murphy	2,775	35.8	+35.8
Independent Liberal	George Burchett	1,331	17.2	+17.2
Total formal votes		7,749	98.4	
Informal votes		126	1.6	
Turnout		7,875	61.0	
Two-party-preferred result
Liberal	Alfred Downward	4,857	62.7	N/A
Labor	Francis Murphy	2,892	37.3	+37.3
Liberal hold		Swing	N/A	
