= Electoral results for the district of Castlemaine and Kyneton =

Australian district election results

This is a list of electoral results for the electoral district of Castlemaine and Kyneton in Victorian state elections.

== Members for Castlemaine and Kyneton ==
Member	Party	Term
Harry Lawson	Nationalist	1927–1928
Walter Langslow	Nationalist	1929
Jessie Satchell	Labor	1929–1932
Clive Shields	United Aust.	1932–1940
Bill Hodson	Labor	1940–1945

== Election results ==
=== Elections in the 1940s ===
1943 Victorian state election: Castlemaine and Kyneton
Party	Candidate	Votes	%	±%
Labor	Bill Hodson	5,202	54.1	−3.6
Country	John Thompson	4,420	45.9	+45.9
Total formal votes		9,622	98.9	0.0
Informal votes		111	1.1	0.0
Turnout		9,733	90.7	−3.9
Labor hold		Swing	N/A	

1940 Victorian state election: Castlemaine and Kyneton
Party	Candidate	Votes	%	±%
Labor	Bill Hodson	5,844	57.7	+9.4
United Australia	Charles Lucas	4,279	42.3	−9.4
Total formal votes		10,123	98.9	−0.5
Informal votes		109	1.1	+0.5
Turnout		10,232	94.6	+0.2
Labor gain from United Australia		Swing	+9.4	

=== Elections in the 1930s ===
1937 Victorian state election: Castlemaine and Kyneton
Party	Candidate	Votes	%	±%
United Australia	Clive Shields	5,404	51.7	−2.9
Labor	Jessie Satchell	5,051	48.3	+2.9
Total formal votes		10,455	99.4	0.0
Informal votes		59	0.6	0.0
Turnout		10,514	94.4	−1.2
United Australia hold		Swing	−2.9	

1935 Victorian state election: Castlemaine and Kyneton
Party	Candidate	Votes	%	±%
United Australia	Clive Shields	5,620	54.6	+2.2
Labor	Reg Pollard	4,665	45.4	−2.2
Total formal votes		10,285	99.4	+0.3
Informal votes		64	0.6	−0.3
Turnout		10,349	95.6	−0.5
United Australia hold		Swing	+2.2	

1932 Victorian state election: Castlemaine and Kyneton
Party	Candidate	Votes	%	±%
United Australia	Clive Shields	5,387	52.4	+2.5
Labor	Jessie Satchell	4,887	47.6	−2.5
Total formal votes		10,274	99.7	+0.1
Informal votes		36	0.3	−0.1
Turnout		10,310	96.1	+0.2
United Australia gain from Labor		Swing	+2.5	

=== Elections in the 1920s ===
1929 Victorian state election: Castlemaine and Kyneton
Party	Candidate	Votes	%	±%
Labor	Jessie Satchell	4,926	50.1	+10.4
Nationalist	Walter Langslow	4,897	49.9	−10.4
Total formal votes		9,823	99.6	+0.6
Informal votes		51	0.4	−0.6
Turnout		9,874	95.9	+2.2
Labor gain from Nationalist		Swing	+10.4	

1929 Castlemaine and Kyneton state by-election
Party	Candidate	Votes	%	±%
Nationalist	Walter Langslow	4,715	50.7	−9.6
Labor	Jessie Satchell	4,589	49.3	+9.6
Total formal votes		9,304	99.4	+0.4
Informal votes		59	0.6	−0.4
Turnout		9,363	93.1	−0.6
Nationalist hold		Swing	−9.6	

1927 Victorian state election: Castlemaine and Kyneton
Party	Candidate	Votes	%	±%
Nationalist	Harry Lawson	5,546	60.3	
Labor	Joseph Hannan	3,658	39.7	
Total formal votes		9,204	99.0	
Informal votes		96	1.0	
Turnout		9,300	93.7	
Nationalist hold		Swing		
