= Electoral results for the district of Port Fairy and Glenelg =

Victoria, Australia, district election results

This is a list of electoral results for the electoral district of Port Fairy and Glenelg in Victorian state elections.

== Members for Port Fairy and Glenelg ==
Member	Party	Term
Ernie Bond	Labor Party	1927–1932
Ernie Bond	Independent	1932–1938
Ernie Bond	Labor Party	1938–1943
Harry Hedditch	United Country Party	1943–1945

== Election results ==
=== Elections in the 1940s ===
1943 Victorian state election: Port Fairy and Glenelg
Party	Candidate	Votes	%	±%
Independent Country	Harry Hedditch	4,589	44.5	+44.5
Labor	Martin Bourke	3,985	38.6	−21.1
Independent	James Hardy	1,002	9.7	+9.7
Country	Paul Bailey	740	7.2	−11.3
Total formal votes		10,316	98.6	−0.1
Informal votes		144	1.4	+0.1
Turnout		10,460	87.6	−8.2
Two-candidate-preferred result
Independent Country	Harry Hedditch	5,611	54.4	
Labor	Martin Bourke	4,705	45.6	
Independent Country gain from Labor		Swing	N/A	

1940 Victorian state election: Port Fairy and Glenelg
Party	Candidate	Votes	%	±%
Labor	Ernie Bond	6,899	59.7	+59.7
United Australia	Sydney Patterson	2,509	21.7	+21.7
Country	Robert Rankin	2,137	18.5	+18.5
Total formal votes		11,545	98.7	−0.7
Informal votes		156	1.3	+0.7
Turnout		11,701	95.8	+1.0
Two-party-preferred result
Labor	Ernie Bond		61.5	+61.5
United Australia	Sydney Patterson		38.5	+38.5
Labor gain from Independent		Swing	N/A	

- Ernie Bond had been elected as an independent in 1937 and joined the Labor party before the election.

=== Elections in the 1930s ===
1937 Victorian state election: Port Fairy and Glenelg
Party	Candidate	Votes	%	±%
Independent Labor	Ernie Bond	8,814	78.0	−22.0
Independent	Robert Roberts	2,487	22.0	+22.0
Total formal votes		11,301	99.4	
Informal votes		71	0.6	
Turnout		11,372	94.8	
Independent Labor hold		Swing	N/A	

1935 Victorian state election: Port Fairy and Glenelg
Party	Candidate	Votes	%	±%
Independent	Ernie Bond	unopposed		
Independent hold		Swing		

1932 Victorian state election: Port Fairy and Glenelg
Party	Candidate	Votes	%	±%
Premiers' Plan Labor	Ernie Bond	5,572	51.3	+51.3
Country	James Heywood Black	3,153	29.9	+29.9
Independent	Hugh MacLeod	2,132	19.6	+19.6
Total formal votes		10,857	98.7	−0.3
Informal votes		145	1.3	+0.3
Turnout		11,002	95.7	−0.4
Premiers' Plan Labor gain from Labor		Swing	N/A	

- Preferences were not distributed.

=== Elections in the 1920s ===
1929 Victorian state election: Port Fairy and Glenelg
Party	Candidate	Votes	%	±%
Labor	Ernie Bond	6,439	61.5	+0.9
Ind. Nationalist	William Stevenson	2,735	26.1	+26.1
Nationalist	Donald Ferguson	1,291	12.3	−27.1
Total formal votes		10,465	99.0	+0.1
Informal votes		111	1.0	−0.1
Turnout		10,576	96.1	+1.9
Labor hold		Swing	N/A	

- Preferences were not distributed.

1927 Victorian state election: Port Fairy and Glenelg
Party	Candidate	Votes	%	±%
Labor	Ernie Bond	6,154	60.6	
Nationalist	William Shaw	3,996	39.4	
Total formal votes		10,150	98.9	
Informal votes		115	1.1	
Turnout		10,265	94.2	
Labor hold		Swing		
