= Downward =

Downward is an English surname. Notable people with the surname include:

- Alfred Downward (1847–1930), Australian politician
- Herbert Downward (1880–1973), Australian politician
- Julian Downward (born 1960), British biochemist
- Peter Downward (1924–2014), British Army officer
