= 1940 Victorian state election =

Australian state election

← 1937	16 March 1940	1943 →

44 (of the 65) seats in the Victorian Legislative Assembly 33 seats needed for a majority
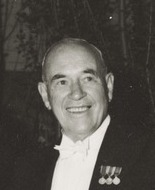

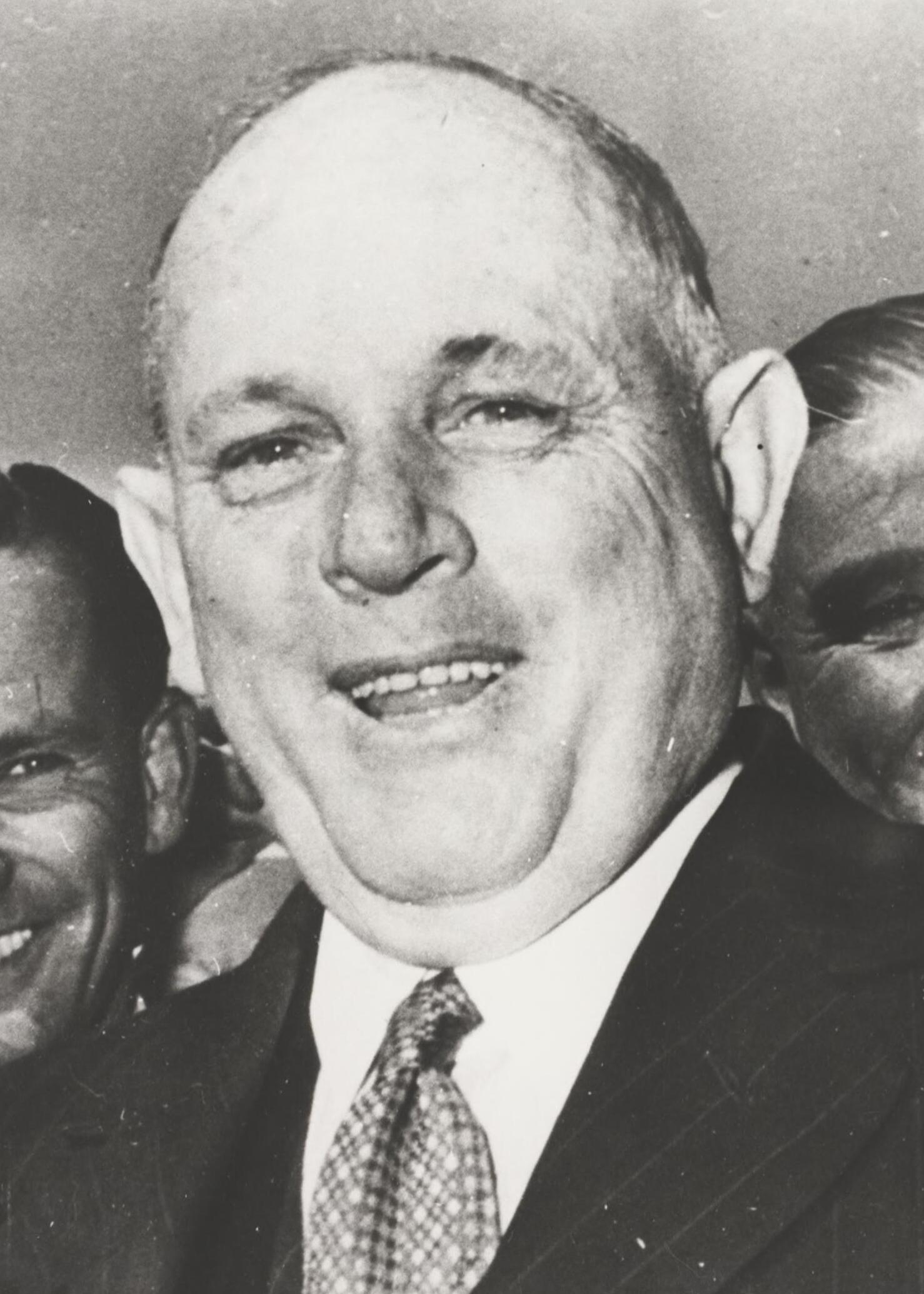

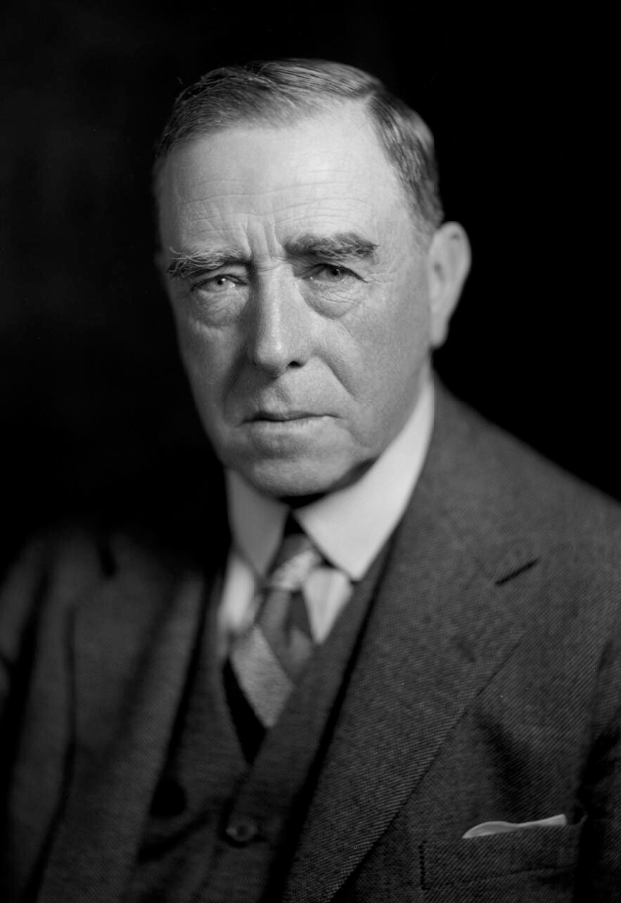
	First party	Second party	Third party
Leader	John Cain	Albert Dunstan	Sir Stanley Argyle
Party	Labor	United Country	United Australia
Leader since	18 October 1937	14 March 1935	3 September 1930
Leader's seat	Northcote	Korong and Eaglehawk	Toorak
Last election	20 seats	20 seats	21 seats
Seats before	21 seats	22 seats	18 seats
Seats won	22 seats	22 seats	16 seats
Seat change	▲1	0	▼2
Percentage	33.17%	14.16%	35.41%
Swing	▼7.86	▲2.81	▼4.15
Premier before election
Albert Dunstan
United Country
Elected Premier
Albert Dunstan
United Country

The 1940 Victorian state election was held in the Australian state of Victoria on Saturday 16 March 1940 to elect 44 of the 65 members of the state's Legislative Assembly.

== Background ==
Several events had taken place since the previous state election on 2 October 1937, which had changed the breakdown of the parties in the Assembly:

- In November 1937, Ian Macfarlan (the member for Brighton) left the United Australia Party (UAP) and sat as an Independent. Macfarlan gave two reasons for his resignation from the UAP: that the party was sitting in opposition to the Dunstan Country government which he praised; and that it was controlled by a central body outside of the parliament, the members of which were unknown to most party members. Frederick Holden (Grant) also left the UAP and sat on the cross benches. This reduced the UAP's numbers from 21 to 19.
- Ernie Bond (Port Fairy and Glenelg) had been expelled from the Labor Party (ALP) over his support for the "Premiers' Plan" in 1932, and had won several elections as an independent. He was re-admitted to the ALP in on 16 April 1938. This increased the ALP's numbers from 20 to 21.
- On 5 November 1938, the United Country Party (UCP) won a by-election in the seat of Gippsland North, after the death of the sitting member James Weir McLachlan, an independent. This reduced the number of Independents to 3, and increased the numbers for the UCP from 20 to 21.
- In August 1939, Alfred Kirton (Mornington) resigned from the UAP and sat briefly as an independent, before joining the United Country Party on 29 August 1939. This reduced the UAP from 19 seats to 18, and increased the UCP seats from 21 to 22.
- In 1939 Frederick Cook (Benalla) moved from being an Independent to joining the Liberal Country Party, a breakaway group from the Country Party who supported the federal party's participation in a Coalition government.

== Results ==
=== Legislative Assembly ===
Victorian state election, 16 March 1940 Legislative Assembly << 1937–1943 >>
Enrolled voters	841,864				
Votes cast	786,359		Turnout	93.41	−0.55
Informal votes	12,287		Informal	1.56	+0.19
Summary of votes by party
Party	Primary votes	%	Swing	Seats	Change
United Australia	274,113	35.41	−4.15	16	−2
Labor	256,744	33.17	−7.86	22	+1
United Country	109,626	14.06	−2.71	22	±0
Liberal Country	18,104	2.34	+2.34	1	±0
Communist	2,935	0.38	−0.34	0	±0
Independent	112,550	14.53	+7.20	4	+1
Total	774,072			65	

== See also ==
- Candidates of the 1940 Victorian state election
- 1940 Victorian Legislative Council election
