= Bill Sykes =

Australian politician

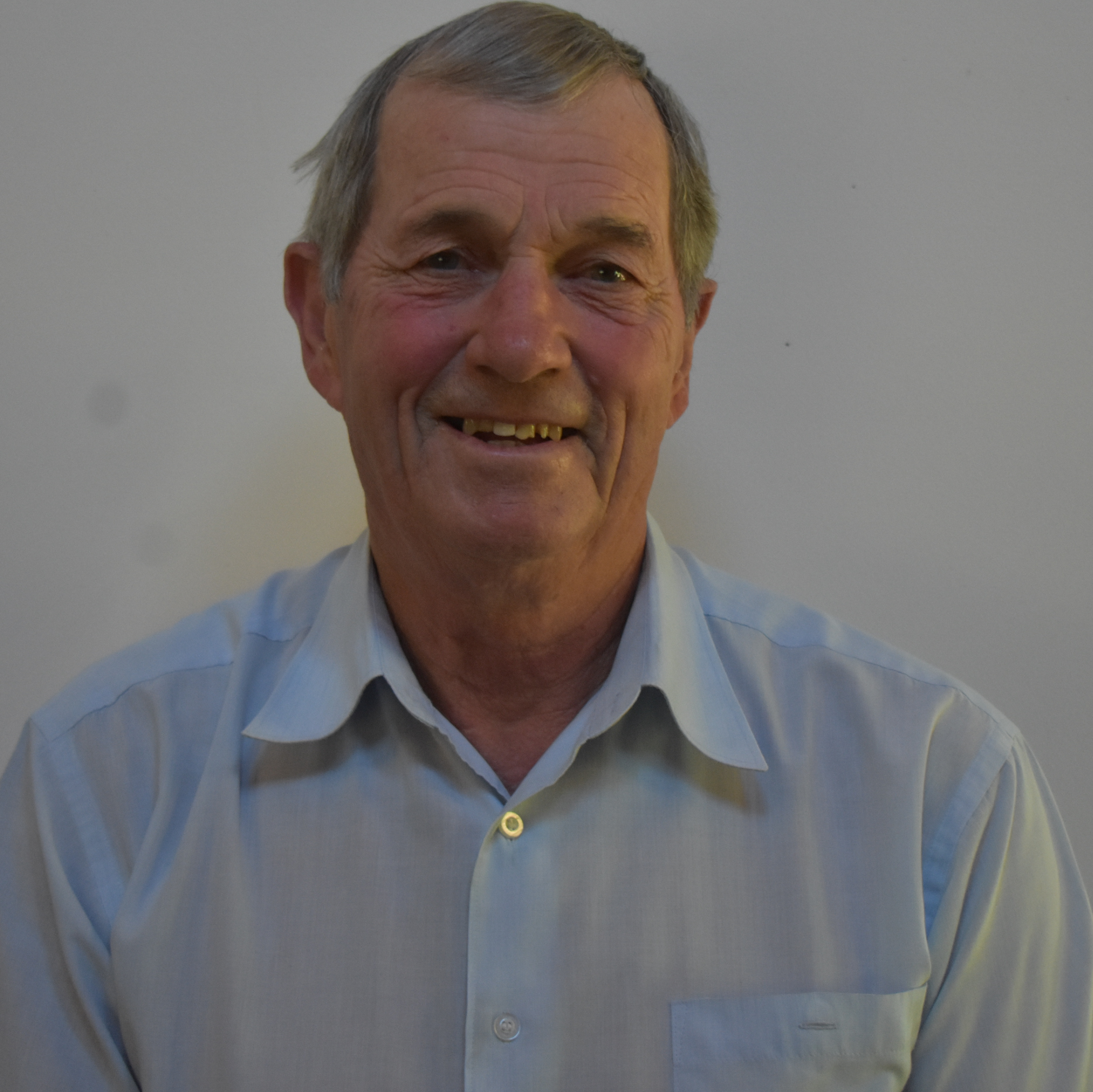
- Sykes in 2026

Member of the Victorian Legislative Assembly for Benalla
- In office 30 November 2002 – 29 November 2014
- Preceded by: Denise Allen
- Succeeded by: Seat abolished

Personal details
- Born: 3 October 1948 (age 77) Melbourne
- Party: National Party
- Children: 3
- Website: billsykes.com.au

William Everett Sykes (born 3 October 1948) is an Australian politician. He was the Nationals member of the Victorian parliament, representing Benalla, from 2002 to 2014, after a career as a veterinarian and businessman.

Sykes was also a Victorian Football League (VFL) footballer, playing 48 games of football for Fitzroy, and later coaching Shepparton, Benalla and Benalla & District junior football teams. As well as being a member of parliament, Sykes and his wife Sally also run a beef cattle and sheep property just out of Benalla.

Together, the Sykes have been involved in a wide range of community activities including school councils, youth groups, sporting clubs, Landcare, fire brigade and the Victorian Farmers Federation. Sykes was also instrumental in the establishment of the Benalla Trust Foundation, a trust to assist local people in times of crisis, and the Benalla Young Sportspersons Trust, a trust that assists promising young athletes to compete in interstate and overseas competitions.

When former Nationals leader and deputy premier Pat McNamara retired from politics in 2000, Sykes ran as the Nationals' candidate in the ensuring by-election. On paper, Sykes had a significant advantage. Benalla was one of the most conservative seats in Victoria; it had been in National hands for all but nine years since 1920 and without interruption since 1943. However, in a major upset, Labor's Denise Allen narrowly defeated Sykes to become the first Labor member ever to win the seat. Labor was re-elected in a landslide in the 2002 election, yet Sykes won Benalla back with only 26% of the primary vote to give a 52% two party preferred vote over Allen. He won the seat on the third count when Liberal candidate Andrew Dwyer's preferences flowed overwhelmingly to him. The seat reverted to form at the 2006 state election, and Sykes held the seat without serious difficulty until his retirement in 2014.

Victorian Legislative Assembly
Preceded by Denise Allen	Member for Benalla; 2002–2014	Abolished
