= John Carlisle (Australian politician) =

Australian politician

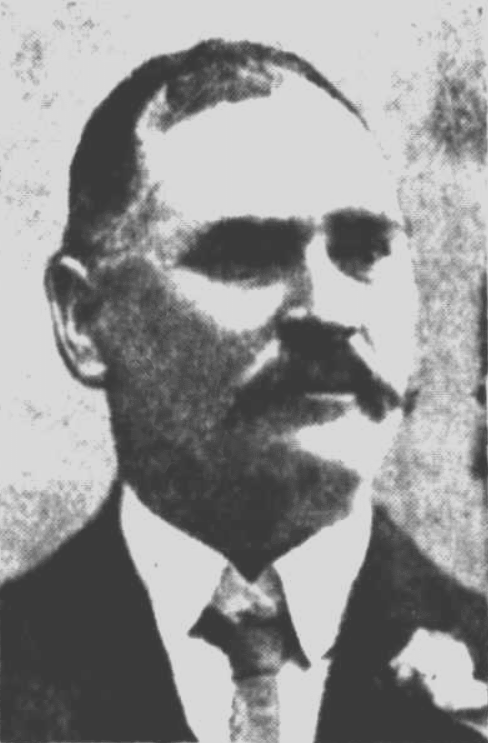
John J. Carlisle, Australian politician

John Joseph Carlisle (c. 1863 – 18 June 1929) was an Australian politician.

Carlisle was born in Mansfield to farmer William Carlisle and Anna Crockett. Following his father's death in 1871 the family moved to Yarrawonga, and Carlisle grew up to become a farmer in the area. He served on Yarrawonga Shire Council from 1895 to 1907 and was president from 1900 to 1901.

In 1903 Carlisle was elected to the Victorian Legislative Assembly for Benalla and Yarrawonga, transferring to Benalla at the election the following year. A Liberal who joined the Economy faction of the Nationalist Party in 1917, he was a minister without portfolio from 29 November 1917 to 21 March 1918. In 1920 he joined the Victorian Farmers' Union, which became the Country Party. In 1926 he left the party after a dispute over a proposed redistribution, and stood at the 1927 election as an independent but was defeated. Carlisle died in Heidelberg on 18 June 1929.

Victorian Legislative Assembly
Preceded by William Hall	Member for Benalla and Yarrawonga; 1903–1904	Abolished
New seat	Member for Benalla; 1904–1927	Succeeded by Edward Cleary
