= Harry Hedditch =

Australian politician

Harold Read "Harry" Hedditch (13 March 1893 – 23 May 1974) was an Australian politician.

Hedditch was born in Bridgewater to farmer William Forward Hedditch and Marian Nunn Jones. He became a bookkeeper and typist, and also ran the family farm at Portland from 1918. He became a real estate agent and also ran a garage. On 28 August 1921 he married Amy Elizabeth Gillies, with whom he had two children; he would later marry a second time, to Bernice Hope Boddington. He served on Portland Borough Council from 1933 to 1943 and was mayor from 1941 to 1943.

In 1943 Hedditch was elected to the Victorian Legislative Assembly for Port Fairy and Glenelg; a Country Party member, he was an unendorsed candidate but joined the parliamentary party. His seat was abolished in 1945 and he was defeated running for Portland. He was elected for Portland in 1947, and in 1949 resigned from the Country Party to join the Liberal and Country Party. He was defeated a second time on 12 May 1950. Hedditch died at Geelong East in 1974.

Victorian Legislative Assembly
Preceded by Ernie Bond	Member for Port Fairy and Glenelg; 1943–1945	Abolished
Preceded by Robert Holt	Member for Portland; 1947–1950	Succeeded by Robert Holt
