= Chris Crewther =

Australian politician (born 1983)

Chris Crewther MP
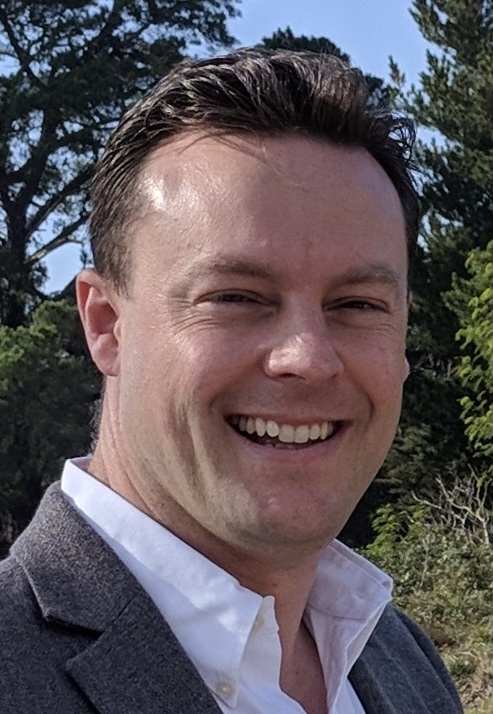

Member of the Victorian Legislative Assembly for Mornington
- Incumbent
- Assumed office 26 November 2022
- Preceded by: David Morris

Member of the Australian Parliament for Dunkley
- In office 2 July 2016 – 18 May 2019
- Preceded by: Bruce Billson
- Succeeded by: Peta Murphy

Personal details
- Born: 6 August 1983 (age 43) Mitcham, Victoria, Australia
- Party: Liberal
- Spouse: Grace
- Children: 2
- Education: Master of Diplomacy, with distinction (ANU); Master of Laws specialising in international law (ANU); Bachelor of Laws with Honours (UC)
- Alma mater: Australian National University; University of Canberra; The University of Melbourne
- Website: http://www.chriscrewther.com.au

Christopher John Crewther (born 6 August 1983) is an Australian politician. He was a Liberal Party of Australia member of the Australian House of Representatives from 2016 to 2019 before being elected to the Victorian State Parliament in 2022, representing the division of Mornington.

== Early life and education ==
Crewther was born in Mitcham, and grew up and went to school in Horsham and Murtoa. After school, Crewther graduated with a Bachelor of Laws with Honours from the University of Canberra, with a science minor. Crewther then added a Graduate Diploma of Legal Practice, and two master's degrees in international law and diplomacy from the Australian National University, the latter in which he was awarded the James Ingram AO Prize for Excellence in Diplomatic Studies for being top student.

== Career ==
Professionally, Crewther has worked as an associate to then ACT Magistrate John Burns, as a lawyer in private practice, in policy and legal roles at the Commonwealth Department of Agriculture, in project management at AIATSIS, on the Port Curtis Coral Coast native title claim, as an international lawyer through the United Nations at the Kosovo Property Agency, as an adviser to former Minister for Veterans' Affairs (Victorian Liberal Senator the Hon. Michael Ronaldson), as CEO of Mildura Development Corporation (now Mildura Regional Development), running his own business, and as Head of Strategic Partnerships for the Global Fund to End Modern Slavery.

== Politics ==
=== Federal parliament ===
Crewther was the Liberal candidate for the outer regional/rural seat of Mallee in 2013, which has been held by the National Party since its establishment in 1949. Crewther was the first Liberal Party candidate to contest the electorate since 1993, reflecting the agreement between the Liberal and National parties not to contest the same seat except on the retirement of a sitting member. Crewther achieved 27.2 percent of the primary vote and 43.8 percent of the two-candidate preferred result, but the seat was held by the National Party.

At the 2016 federal election, Crewther was elected to the federal parliament for the inner regional/outer metropolitan seat of Dunkley, winning with a 1.43% margin, following the retirement of long-serving member Bruce Billson.

After a speech to parliament in late 2016, Crewther established the Parliamentary Friendship Group for Tourette syndrome as its founding chair.

Crewther was chair of the Australian Parliament's Foreign Affairs and Aid Sub-Committee, under the Joint Standing Committee on Foreign Affairs, Defence and Trade (JSCFADT). He chaired the Sub-Committee's "Inquiry into establishing a Modern Slavery Act in Australia", tabling the sub-committee's interim report in August 2017, and the final report ("Hidden in Plain Sight") in December 2017, which led to Australia's Modern Slavery Act 2018.

Crewther was named amongst Assent Compliance's Global Top 100 Corporate Social Responsibility Influence Leaders for 2018 and awarded a Freedom Award from Anti-Slavery Australia in October 2019.

Crewther was also Chair of the Australian Coalition Government's Policy Committee on Home Affairs and Legal Affairs, and Chair of the Australian Parliament's Ukraine-Australia Parliamentary Friendship Group.

He was defeated by Labor candidate Peta Murphy at the 2019 federal election, having been disadvantaged by an electoral redistribution that made Dunkley notionally Labor, and a 1.7% two-party-preferred swing to Labor.

Crewther ran for Liberal Party preselection in Dunkley for the 2022 federal election, but was unsuccessful.

=== State parliament ===
Crewther in 2026 at an election forum for Mornington

In December 2021, Crewther defeated long-standing member for Mornington, David Morris, to win preselection as the Liberal candidate for Mornington for the 2022 Victorian state election. Crewther went on to narrowly win the seat against a ‘Teal’ independent candidate.

In his inaugural speech to the Victorian Parliament, Crewther spoke of his opposition to vaccine mandates, and advocated for the decriminalisation of drug use and a "HECS-based system for [non-government] schools".

In December 2022, Crewther was appointed as the Shadow Parliamentary Secretary for Justice and Corrections, and Liberal Party Whip in the Victorian Legislative Assembly. In May 2023, Crewther voted against the successful motion to expel Moira Deeming from the Victorian parliamentary Liberal Party, and voted for her readmission in December 2024.

Crewther nominated to replace John Pesutto in a leadership election on 27 December 2024. He declared his nomination to his Liberal colleagues the morning of the vote. After beating Jess Wilson in the first round (receiving 20 votes compared to Jess Wilson's 11 votes and Brad Battin's 25 votes), he was beaten by Brad Battin 21–7 in the final round of voting. Under Brad Battin, he continued as Liberal Party Whip, and was appointed as the Shadow Assistant Minister for Housing and Rental Affordability. In a later reshuffle, he continued as Liberal Party Whip, and was appointed as Shadow Assistant Minister for Public Transport and Shadow Assistant Minister for Multicultural Affairs.

Following the November 2025 Victorian Liberal Party leadership spill that elected Wilson, Crewther again continued as Liberal Party Whip, and was appointed by Jess Wilson as Shadow Assistant Treasurer and in an updated role as Shadow Assistant Minister for Multicultural and Multifaith Affairs. Following the subsequent resignation and retirement from politics of previous deputy leader Sam Groth in January 2026, Crewther nominated to be the next deputy leader. He lost the ballot to David Southwick 23 votes to six.

Crewther is a member of the conservative faction of the Liberal Party.

== Personal life ==
Crewther lives on the Mornington Peninsula and has two young children with his wife Grace. He has a mild form of Tourette syndrome, which was diagnosed in his early twenties, and was for several years patron of the Tourette Syndrome Association of Australia.

Crewther has been a member of the Australian Government's Modern Slavery Expert Advisory Group, a non-executive director of Zoe Support Australia and Global Voices, and a member of several other boards and committees.

Parliament of Australia
Preceded by Bruce Billson	Member for Dunkley; 2016–2019	Succeeded by Peta Murphy
Victorian Legislative Assembly
Preceded by David Morris	Member for Mornington; 2022–present	Incumbent
