= Jessie Satchell =

Australian politician

Jessie Edward Satchell (7 January 1875 – 8 April 1955) was an Australian politician.

He was born in Myamyn, Victoria to farmer Jesse Satchell and Helen Brown. He attended state schools and became a farm worker, joining Victorian Railways as an iron and steel moulder. On 1 May 1901 he married Agnes Lodding, with whom he had four children. In 1918 he became a foreman moulder in Castlemaine, and he served on Castlemaine Borough Council from 1928 to 1933. In 1929 he was elected to the Victorian Legislative Assembly as the Labor member for Castlemaine and Kyneton, but he was defeated in 1932. Around 1934 he returned to Melbourne and worked for the tramways. Satchell died in Hartwell in 1955.

Victorian Legislative Assembly
Preceded by Walter Langslow	Member for Castlemaine and Kyneton; 1929–1932	Succeeded by Clive Shields
