= Denise Allen =

Australian politician (1953–2022)

- Allen in 2000

Member of the Victorian Legislative Assembly for Benalla
- In office 13 May 2000 – 30 November 2002
- Preceded by: Pat McNamara
- Succeeded by: Bill Sykes

Personal details
- Born: 29 March 1953 Alexandra, Victoria
- Died: 22 January 2022 (aged 68)
- Party: Labor; People Power (2006)

Denise Margaret Allen (née Boote, 29 March 1953 – 22 January 2022) was an Australian politician, political strategist, social commentator and disability advocate.

== Life and career ==
In March 1953, Denise Boote was born to Jack and Betty Boote in Alexandra, the youngest of three children. Jack Boote was a life member of the Australian Labor Party. She attended Alexandra Primary School and Alexandra High School, receiving her leaving certificate in 1970. After leaving school, she met John Allen in Port Moresby, whom she would later marry and have three children with. The couple divorced in 1984, making Allen a single mother. Prior to entering politics, Allen was a life skills and motivational tutor. She also owned a modelling agency, beauty therapy studio and retail fashion store.

In 2000, Allen was the Labor Party candidate in the by-election for the seat of Benalla in the Victorian Legislative Assembly, which was being vacated by former deputy premier and state Nationals leader Pat McNamara. On paper, Allen faced daunting odds. Benalla was a staunchly conservative division in rural north-eastern Victoria and had been in National hands for all but nine years since 1920. However, she won a surprise victory by 237 votes over new Nationals' candidate Bill Sykes. She was the first-ever Labor member to win the division. A Buddhist, she was the inaugural chairperson of the Parliamentary Friends of Tibet. In the 2002 state election, she was defeated by Sykes in a rematch, despite the Labor government being re-elected in a landslide. Although Allen led on the primary vote, she was defeated on the third count after the preferences of the Liberal candidate, Andrew Dwyer, flowed overwhelmingly to Sykes, resulting in a 52-48 two-party-preferred percentage of the vote in favour of the Nationals.

Amidst the campaign for the Benalla by-election, Allen stated her support for a review of Delatite Shire as proposed by the Mansfield District Residents and Ratepayers Association, which was in favour of de-amalgamation of the shire. A member of the association, Allen credited upset over amalgamation as a key factor in her by-election win, specifically stating that it contributed to a large swing in Mansfield.

Allen left the Labor Party in 2005. She would become a candidate for the short-lived People Power party at the 2006 Victorian state election, standing in the Legislative Council seat of Northern Victoria. At the time, she expressed disillusionment with Labor's stances, arguing their policies unjustly favoured corporate businesses and the upper class, and that Labor had abandoned country Victoria just as the government of Jeff Kennett did. With Allen as the lead candidate, the People Power ticket in Northern Victoria polled 2,497 first-preference votes, or 0.68% of the total vote in the region, at the 2006 election.

Allen attempted to seek Labor preselection in the federal seat of Indi at the 2013 election, but was blocked from nominating. Allen stated that this was due to the length of her membership in the local branch. In January 2014 Allen announced her intent to nominate for Labor preselection in Euroa, which included large chunks of the former Benalla district, at the 2014 state election. Labor's candidate for Euroa in 2014 was Clare Malcolm. Following the retirement of Stephen Conroy, Allen nominated for Labor selection to fill his Senate seat. She was unsuccessful, with the position being filled by Kimberley Kitching.

Allen died from cancer on 22 January 2022, at the age of 68.

Victorian Legislative Assembly
Preceded by Pat McNamara	Member for Benalla; 2000–2002	Succeeded by Bill Sykes
