= Herbert Downward =

Australian politician

Herbert Edward Graham Downward (25 April 1880 – 5 July 1973) was an Australian politician.

He was born in Emerald Hill to Alfred Downward and Josephine Kerr. He was educated in Mornington, and managed the family property there before he inherited it. On 31 May 1916 he married Eileen May Edwards, with whom he had three sons. He served on Flinders Shire Council from 1917 to 1920 and Mornington Shire Council from 1919 to 1931, serving as president of the latter from 1922 to 1923 and from 1929 to 1930. In 1929 he was elected to the Victorian Legislative Assembly as the Country Party member for Mornington, succeeding his father. He served until his defeat in 1932. Downward died in Frankston in 1973.

Victorian Legislative Assembly
Preceded by Alfred Downward	Member for Mornington; 1929–1932	Succeeded by Alfred Kirton
