= Robin Cooper (politician) =

Australian politician (1936–2021)

Robert Fitzgerald "Robin" Cooper (25 April 1936 – 23 November 2021) was an Australian politician.

Born in Melbourne, Victoria, he attended Xavier College and later the Royal Melbourne Institute of Technology before embarking on a career in sales and marketing in the building supplies industry. In 1972 he was elected to Mornington Shire Council, and became president of the council 1979–80.

In 1985 he was elected to the Victorian Legislative Assembly as the Liberal member for Mornington and was immediately elevated to the front bench, serving as Shadow Minister for Local Government and Public Works. In 1987 he was given the portfolios of Arts and Police and Emergency Services, exchanging Arts for Corrections in 1988. In 1989 he moved to Local Government and Tourism, and in 1990 to Public Transport. In 1991, however, he left the front bench. He was appointed a parliamentary secretary in 1996 in the Kennett Government before being promoted to the Ministry of Transport in 1997. He left the front bench again on the Coalition's defeat in 1999. He spent a period as Manager of Opposition Business in the Assembly in 2006 before retiring at that year's state election. Cooper died on 23 November 2021, at the age of 85.

Parliament of Victoria
Preceded by New seat	Member for Mornington; 1985–2006	Succeeded by David Morris
