= 2000 Benalla state by-election =

By-election in Victoria, Australia

- 13 May 2000

District of Benalla in the Legislative Assembly
- Turnout: 89.6%

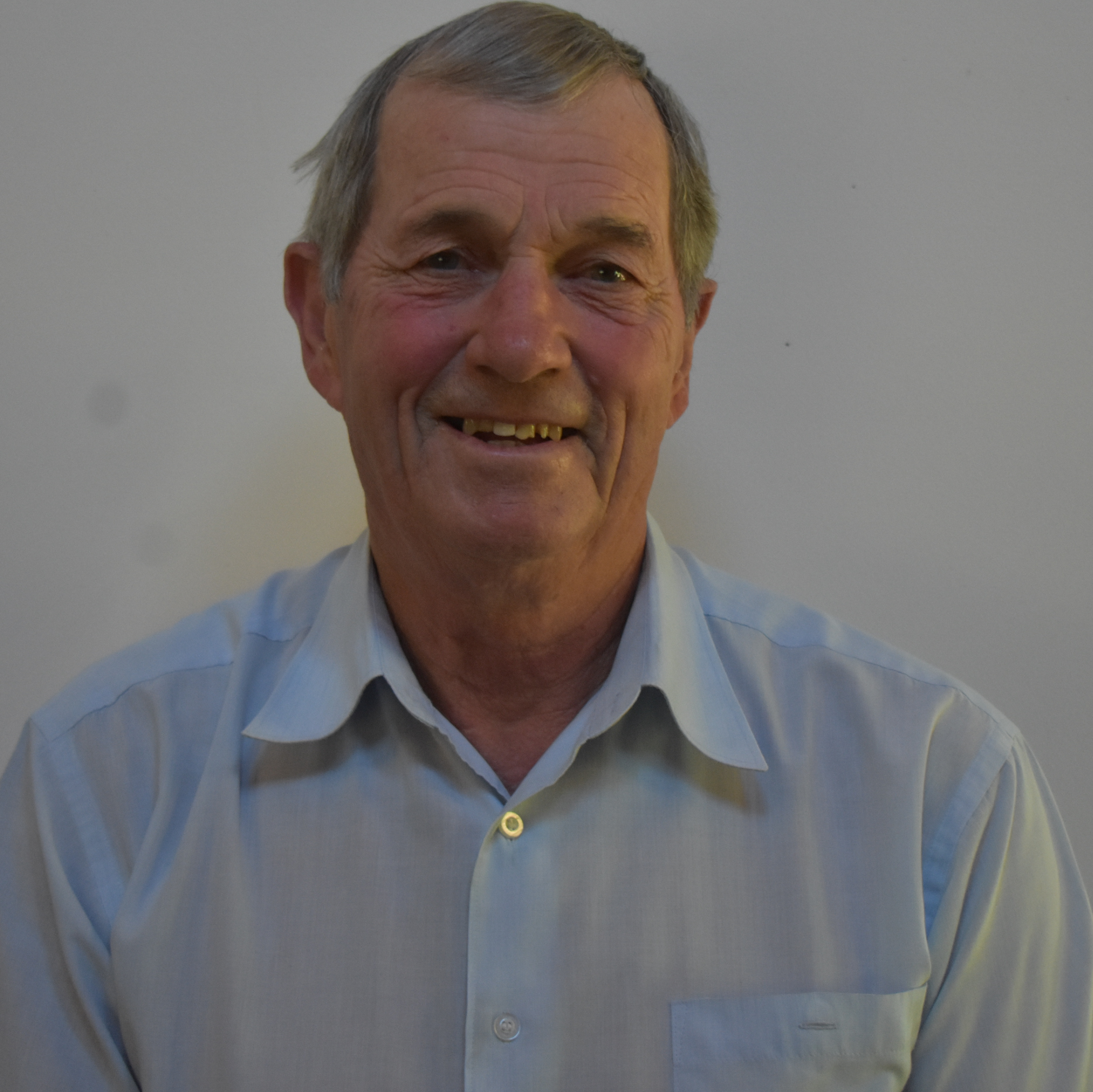
	First party	Second party
Candidate	Denise Allen	Bill Sykes
Party	Labor	National
Primary vote	12,514	12,244
Percentage	42.07%	41.16%
Swing	▼0.52 pp	▼16.25 pp
TPP	14,991	14,754
TPP pct	50.40%	49.60%
TPP swing	▲7.81 pp	▼7.81 pp
	Third party	Fourth party
	IND	IND
Candidate	Geoff Rowe	Bill Hill
Party	Independent	Independent
Primary vote	2,072	1,983
Percentage	6.97%	6.67%
- Boundaries of the district of Benalla (highlighted in green) at the time of the by-election
MP before election
Pat McNamara
National
Elected MP
Denise Allen
Labor

The 2000 Benalla state by-election was held on 13 May 2000, to elect a new member of the Victorian Legislative Assembly in the district of Benalla. The by-election was triggered by the resignation on 12 April of Pat McNamara, the sitting member who was Deputy Premier of Victoria until the defeat of the Kennett government at the 1999 state election.

Contested by Labor candidate Denise Allen and Nationals candidate Bill Sykes, as well as a number of independents and minor party candidates, the election campaign received attention from statewide party leaders, with local issues such as a review of the Delatite Shire and the future of Benalla College's Dunlop campus receiving attention.

The by-election was won by Allen, who became the first Labor member to represent Benalla since its creation in 1904. Allen's victory was widely regarded as a political upset, and gave the Labor Party 44 seats in the 88-member Legislative Assembly. The result in Benalla sparked recriminations within the Liberal–National Coalition, with the Nationals voting to leave the Coalition in July 2000 following an internal review.

== Background ==
Following the defeat of the Kennett government at the 1999 Victorian state election, a vacancy in the district of Benalla was widely expected, given it was held by outgoing Nationals leader and former Deputy Premier Pat McNamara, who had won it in 1999 on a 7.5 percent margin. By April 2000, when McNamara's resignation was reported as imminent, the Nationals and Labor had already preselected candidates and opened campaign offices in Benalla. McNamara ultimately resigned on 12 April 2000, ahead of the Nationals party conference that weekend. In his valedictory speech, McNamara said that he looked forward to spending time with his wife and family, and engaging in non-political endeavours. The writ for the by-election was issued by Speaker Alex Andrianopoulos on 17 April, with the date set for 13 May and the deadline for nominations being 27 April.

After the 1999 Burwood by-election, won by Labor's Bob Stensholt following the resignation of Liberal Jeff Kennett, Labor had 43 seats in the Legislative Assembly, with the Liberal and National parties having 42, and three independents holding the balance of power. A Labor win in Benalla would give them 44 seats, and while they would still require independent support to pass legislation, their position in the Assembly would be strengthened.

== Candidates ==
A list of candidates can be found below in ballot paper order:

Party	Candidate	Background
Independent	Maurie Smith	Seymour veteran and investor
Independent	Bill Hill	Warrenbayne sheep farmer, candidate for this seat in 1996
Reform	Alf Thorpe	Bendigo mediator, candidate for Bendigo East in 1999
Labor	Denise Allen	Swanpool small business owner, candidate for this seat in 1999
Greens	Janet Mackenzie	Mansfield book editor
National	Bill Sykes	Benalla veterinarian, former player with Fitzroy Football Club
Independent	Geoff Rowe	Upper Lurg public accountant

In February 2000, prior to McNamara's resignation, Bill Sykes and John Tanner, two National Party members, expressed their interest in replacing him, with McNamara stating he would not step down until a successor was selected. McNamara was complimentary towards Sykes and Tanner, citing Sykes specifically as a potential future minister. The two candidates for National preselection were Sykes, of Benalla, and Debra Netherway, a Locksley olive farmer. It was held on March 4, and Sykes was successful.

Denise Allen and Zuvele Leschen, Labor's candidates for Benalla at the 1999 and 1996 state elections respectively, were the two registered candidates for Labor preselection at the by-election.

The Liberal Party chose not to stand a candidate in the by-election, in a decision supported by party leader Denis Napthine. Ian Carson, president of the Victorian Liberal Party, stated that the decision was made following talks with the Victorian Nationals. Bill Dobson, the president of the Liberal Party's Benalla branch, stated that a Liberal candidate would maximise the conservative vote.

The Greens candidate was announced as Janet Mackenzie on 25 April. The Reform Party solicited applications for preselection in local newspapers.

== Campaign ==
Immediately, the race for Benalla was viewed as potentially competitive. The 1996 and 1999 Victorian state elections had seen swings towards Labor in the traditionally conservative district, which Labor had not won since its creation in 1904. The local government elections of March had resulted in losses for Liberal and National aligned councillors in the southern end of the Delatite Shire, replaced by candidates of the Mansfield District Residents and Ratepayers Association (MDRRA), due to local anger surrounding amalgamation of the Mansfield Shire into Delatite by the Kennett government. Many in the Mansfield area were dissatisfied with the amalgamation, believing that the former Mansfield Shire could stand alone due to a large amount of non-resident ratepayers, and that McNamara had insisted on the council merger. Will Twycross, a councillor from Mansfield, told The Age that "Mansfield's position is that it is a viable local government entity on its own. The amalgamation has been a disaster for us."

With the by-election scheduled shortly after the delivery of the state budget, Peter Ryan, leader of the Victorian Nationals, told the Nationals state conference in Bendigo that Labor would likely attempt porkbarrelling tactics to win the seat of Benalla. At an 18 April campaign launch for Labor in Benalla, Premier Steve Bracks argued that the Nationals had lost their distinct identity as a regional party, and were functionally identical to the Liberal Party. Denis Napthine, leader of the Victorian Liberals, had appeared in Benalla that same day to endorse Bill Sykes.

The three independents sitting in the Victorian Parliament at the time — Russell Savage, Susan Davies, and Craig Ingram — also announced that they would urge voters to reject both major party candidacies, with Savage stating that Bill Hill and Geoff Rowe were both possible alternatives to "the path of party politics", while not endorsing either candidate. Davies said on 30 April that the three independents would seek to "work closely" with an elected Benalla independent, while acknowledging differences in opinion.

The future of Benalla College's Dunlop campus, which faced both an attempted closure in 1996 and a funding shortfall, was a local issue in the by-election. Independent Hill supported the renovation of the Dunlop campus, stating that the campus should also host community education as well as secondary schooling. Education minister Mary Delahunty announced during the campaign that Benalla College would be provided A$330,000 for urgent upgrades, following her own visit to Dunlop.

A number of candidates voiced their support for MDRRA's proposal for a review of the Shire of Delatite. Ryan and Sykes of the Nationals announced their support in April 2000, though Ryan clarified he did not support de-amalgamation. Allen also supported the review plan at a MDRRA meeting, saying she would then support further appropriate outcomes as a result of the review. Independents Hill and Rowe, as well as Greens candidate Janet Mackenzie, also supported a review for Delatite. Bob Cameron, the local government minister, announced on 5 May he was in full support of the proposed review.

In regards to whether de-amalgamation should be considered in response to community advocacy, Sykes was in favour of an independent assessment to consider changes. Allen believed that the government should consider new local government boundaries following community consultation. Hill stated he would consult with the community to consider their views on the issue. Rowe emphasised a need for objective decision-making and extensive research into the economic viability of the proposed polities. Mackenzie was a staunch advocate for de-amalgamation, stating that it would be an example of democracy at work, and that the March local elections showed local anger with the amalgamation of Mansfield into Delatite Shire.

A Labor proposal at the time was to legislate for supervised injection sites in the city of Melbourne, with the aim of controlling heroin addiction. As a result, Nationals advertisements aired arguing that "a vote for Labor is a vote for heroin injecting rooms", although none were proposed in the electorate of Benalla. Ingram and Savage had indicated they would oppose the supervised injecting proposal, which, assuming Liberal and National opposition, would be enough for it to fail. However, if Labor was successful in the Benalla by-election, they would have 44 out of 88 Legislative Assembly seats, meaning only one non-Labor vote would be required to pass the legislation. This could have resulted in the proposal's success, given independent Susan Davies supported the supervised injecting plan.

== Results ==
On election night and with 75 per cent of the vote counted, Labor candidate Denise Allen held a small lead against the Nationals' Bill Sykes, with preferences yet to be distributed. Neither party immediately declared victory. However, on the morning of Sunday 14 May, the Nationals conceded defeat, as all votes had been counted and Allen appeared to have secured 50.66 percent of the two-party preferred vote. Final figures can be seen below:

2000 Benalla by-election
Party	Candidate	Votes	%	±%
Labor	Denise Allen	12,514	42.07	−0.52
National	Bill Sykes	12,244	41.16	−16.25
Independent	Geoff Rowe	2,072	6.97	+6.97
Independent	Bill Hill	1,983	6.67	+6.67
Greens	Janet Mackenzie	597	2.01	+2.01
Independent	Maurie Smith	234	0.79	+0.79
Reform	Alf Thorpe	101	0.34	+0.34
Total formal votes		29,745	97.22	+0.79
Informal votes		849	2.78	–0.79
Turnout		30,594	89.60	−3.35
Two-party-preferred result
Labor	Denise Allen	14,991	50.40	+7.81
National	Bill Sykes	14,754	49.60	−7.81
Labor gain from National		Swing	7.81	

== Aftermath and reactions ==
While not declaring victory, on election night Premier Steve Bracks labeled the Benalla result a "massive endorsement" of the Labor government, and Denise Allen said that Labor was now the party of country Victoria. Nationals leader Peter Ryan stated that the closeness of the 2000 budget to the by-election's date had assisted Labor. The loss in Benalla marked three consecutive losses for the Liberal and National parties in Victoria following the state election of 1999, after the loss of the 1999 Frankston East supplementary election and the 1999 Burwood state by-election, both lost by the Liberals and the latter following the resignation of Jeff Kennett.

Labor had never won the seat of Benalla before, with the seat having been represented by conservative MPs for its 97 years of existence. Frank Bessell, a Benalla resident and rank-and-file Labor member since 1950, summarised the electorate's traditional resistance to left-leaning politics by stating that two decades ago, one wearing the Labor membership badge down the streets of Benalla town would have been "called a commo".

Tensions were noted within the Victorian Coalition as a result of Benalla. Peter Ryan promised that the Nationals would conduct a full-scale review of the party, including its coalition agreement with the Liberals, and Nationals state president John Tanner stated that members of the party were in favour of considering a split from the Liberals. Meanwhile, some federal Liberal politicians argued that the Nationals were to blame for the loss. Lou Lieberman, MP for Indi, stated that Pat McNamara should not have caused the by-election by resigning. Sharman Stone, MP for Murray, called for a preservation of the Coalition and emphasised the importance of Liberal candidates running across country Victoria. Fran Bailey, MP for McEwen, said that a Liberal candidate in Benalla would have achieved a better result. Peter McGauran, federal Nationals MP for Gippsland, was critical of McNamara's decision to resign, stating that it played into a perception that the voters of Benalla were being taken for granted. Following a review, a meeting of the Nationals state council and parliamentary caucus voted to withdraw the party from the Coalition on 14 July 2000.

Les Twentyman, a youth worker with Open Family, said that the Benalla by-election result signified a mandate for the Bracks Labor government to proceed with legislation for supervised injecting rooms in Melbourne. The injecting room proposal still faced opposition in the Legislative Council, and Labor abandoned the proposal in advance of the 2002 Victorian state election. Liberal member and beef breeder Don Lawson noted McNamara's involvement in a failed scheme to combat bovine Johne's disease as having potentially depressed Nationals support in Benalla.

At the 2002 state election, Sykes was successful in winning Benalla against Allen and Liberal candidate Andrew Dwyer, gaining the seat with 51.97% of the two-party-preferred vote.
