= Walter Langslow =

Australian politician

Walter Lovell Langslow (25 October 1900 – 21 January 1973) was an Australian politician.

He was born in Castlemaine to law clerk Lovell Langslow and Agnes Kirkpatrick. He attended Geelong College and the University of Melbourne, receiving a Bachelor of Law. He practiced as a solicitor from 1924, and from 1928 to 1940 served on Castlemaine Borough Council (mayor 1932–33, 1936–37). In 1929 he won a by-election for the Victorian Legislative Assembly seat of Castlemaine and Kyneton, representing the Nationalist Party, but he was defeated in the general election later that year. He served in the Royal Australian Air Force during World War II. Langslow died in Castlemaine in 1973.

Victorian Legislative Assembly
Preceded by Harry Lawson	Member for Castlemaine and Kyneton; 1929	Succeeded by Jessie Satchell
