= Tom Trewin =

Australian politician

Thomas Campion Trewin (9 October 1914 – 14 July 1992) was an Australian politician.

He was born in Benalla to farmer Percy Charles Trewin and schoolteacher Ellen Alice Bradbury. Educated at Goorambat and Benalla, he became a farmer at Devenish. On 23 March 1940 he married Eliza May Martin; they had four children.

Active in both the local community and the local Country Party, he was elected to the Victorian Legislative Assembly in 1961 as the member for Benalla. He served until his retirement in 1982. Trewin died in 1992.

Victorian Legislative Assembly
Preceded by Frederick Cook	Member for Benalla; 1961–1982	Succeeded by Pat McNamara
