= David Morris (Australian politician) =

Australian politician (born 1955)

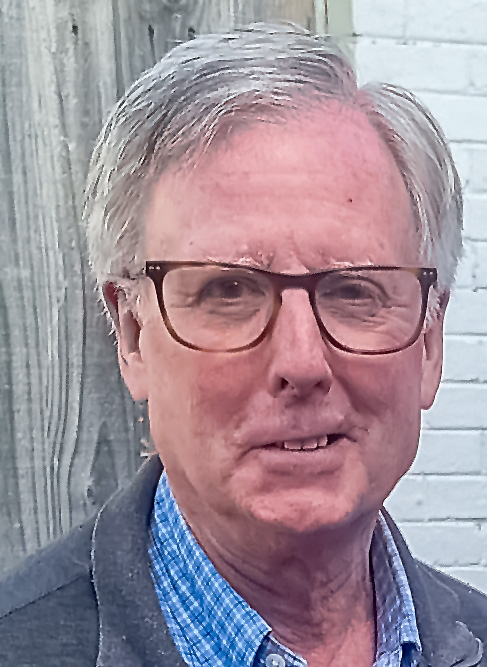

Member of the Victorian Legislative Assembly for Mornington
- In office 25 November 2006 – 26 November 2022
- Preceded by: Robin Cooper
- Succeeded by: Chris Crewther

Personal details
- Born: David Charles Morris; 30 December 1955 (age 70) East Melbourne, Victoria
- Party: Liberal Party
- Website: davidmorris.org.au

David Charles Morris (born 30 December 1955) is a former member of the Victorian Legislative Assembly representing the electorate of Mornington for the Liberal Party from 2006 until 2022.

== Early life and education ==
Morris was born in East Melbourne, Victoria and lived variously in Melbourne and Geelong, attending Geelong College and Caulfield Grammar.

He was a retail executive from 1975 to 1980, after which he became a small business proprietor, a career that lasted until his election to the Legislative Assembly in 2006.

== Politics and Parliament ==
Morris joined the Liberal Party in 1975 and was elected to Mornington Shire Council, in 1987, serving until 1994 (including a period as president, 1992 to 1993).

Im 2005 Morris was selected as the Liberal candidate for Mornington, a seat being vacated by sitting member Robin Cooper. He was first elected in November 2006.

In 2008, he voted in favour of the "Abortion Law Reform Act 2008" one of the few Liberal MP's to do so, he also became the Shadow Parliamentary Secretary for Local Government and in 2010 added Shadow Parliamentary Secretary for Environment and Climate Change to his responsibilities.

Following the election of the Baillieu Government in 2010 Morris was appointed Parliamentary Secretary for Local Government and a member of the Privileges Committee of the Legislative Assembly and of the Parliament's Public Accounts and Estimates Committee. In February 2013 he was elected Chair of that Committee.

In 2014, following the change of government, Morris was appointed Shadow Minister for Finance by the new Opposition Leader, Matthew Guy, and was elected deputy chair of both the Legislative Assembly Privileges Committee and the Public Accounts and Estimates Committee. In 2017, after a minor re-shuffle of the Shadow Ministry he was appointed Shadow Minister for Local Government and Shadow Cabinet Secretary in addition to his existing responsibilities.

In December 2021 Morris lost Liberal Party preselection for the 2022 Victorian state election to former Federal member for Dunkley Chris Crewther. He retired at the 2022 Victorian state election.

== Personal ==
Morris is married to Linda and has three stepchildren, one of which is federal MP Tim Wilson.

In 2008 he walked the wartime route of the Kokoda Track.

Victorian Legislative Assembly
Preceded by Robin Cooper	Member for Mornington; 2006–2022	Succeeded by Chris Crewther
