= Clive Shields =

Australian politician (1879–1956)

Member of the Victorian Legislative Assembly for Castlemaine and Kyneton
- In office 1932–1940
- Preceded by: Jessie Satchell
- Succeeded by: Bill Hodson

Personal details
- Born: 28 April 1879 Hamilton, Victoria
- Died: 4 September 1956 (aged 77) Kew, Victoria
- Party: United Australia Party

Clive Shields (28 April 1879 – 4 September 1956) was an Australian politician. He was a United Australia Party member of the Victorian Legislative Assembly from 1932 to 1940, representing the electorate of Castlemaine and Kyneton. He was Assistant Minister in Charge of Sustenance from 1933 to 1935 and briefly Minister for Agriculture in 1935 under Sir Stanley Argyle.

== Early career ==
Shields was born in Hamilton, and attended a local state school and the University High School. He entered Trinity College in 1901, while studying medicine at the University of Melbourne. He excelled academically, served as president of the Dialectic Club, before graduating in 1906. Shields worked as a resident surgeon at the Melbourne, Children's and Infectious Diseases Hospital before moving to Western Australia in November 1907 to take up the position of hospital superintendent at Broad Arrow. He was practising at Davyhurst in 1908; later positions in Western Australia included service as a medical officer at Meekatharra (1910–1914) and Cue (1916–1918). He announced his resignation from his position at Cue in November 1917, intending to enlist in the Army Medical Corps in World War I; a replacement was appointed in January 1918, and newspaper reports in February and April stated that he was travelling prior to enlisting, but there are no reports of him serving in World War I.

Shields moved back to Victoria permanently in 1919, and settled at Malmsbury. He retired from medical practice in 1928. He was active in the local Church of England, and was secretary of the Malmsbury sustenance committee from 1930 to 1932. He was endorsed as the United Australia Party candidate for Castlemaine and Kyneton at the 1932 state election, defeating two other candidates for preselection, and went on to win the election, defeating incumbent Labor MP Jessie Satchell by more than 400 votes. He had been strongly supported by Melbourne newspaper The Argus.

== Minister ==
Shields was promoted to the ministry in November 1933, filling the vacancy caused by the departure of Thomas Chester Manifold. He was initially made an honorary minister, but was shortly after appointed Assistant Minister in Charge of Sustenance. This saw Shields become responsible for overseeing the system of sustenance relief for those affected by the Great Depression By April 1934, he was supervising 17,000 men engaging in work for sustenance, with an intent to obtain work for another 5,000. The system had different rates, with a higher rate for those capable of working and a lower "benevolent rate" for those who were not. He was responsible for cutting sustenance payments to unemployed city residents who refused to work for sustenance harvesting in the country.

He was promoted to Minister for Agriculture in 1935, in a reshuffle that followed the decision of the Country Party to break coalition with the UAP. However, thirteen days later, the Argyle government was defeated as a result of the coalition split, and Country Party leader Albert Dunstan formed a minority government with the support of Labor, isolating the UAP in opposition. His successor as minister, Ned Hogan, stated that he regretted the "innocent means" of Shields' departure, and joked that he was "sure it would be better for Dr. Shields that it should be so because the department was a place full of difficulties".

== Final years in parliament and retirement ==
In July 1936, Shields was one of eight country MPs who formed the "Country and Liberal wing" and moved to the corner benches of parliament, distancing themselves from the UAP leadership while not leaving the party entirely. They cited dissatisfaction with the leadership of Argyle, and a need to liberalise party policy and be more sympathetic to country interests. Shields became the "duty chairman" of the group. Shields personally described the group as "the first step towards a rapprochement between the Country Party and the UAP", and distanced them from the "ultra-conservative views" of some members of the UAP. By 1937, he declared that the move had failed and there was no further use for the section.

Shields was re-elected at the 1937 state election, retaining the seat against a challenge from former member Satchell. In 1937, he made a public plea for an increase in funding for the University of Melbourne. Following the failure of the separate Country and Liberal section, two of its members resigned from the party to sit as independents in October 1937; however, Shields elected to remain with the UAP.

Shields announced in August 1938 that he would retire at the 1940 state election, declaring that parliamentary life did not suit his health. Several days later, Shields publicly attacked his own constituents in the media, declaring that most electors "did not care who represented them as long as the member would do something for them personally", that it did not matter what his views were or how he voted, that he was "sick of all this eternal begging – begging for someone else" and "fed up with oiling the parish pump" and expressing his irritation that he was expected to "open every bazaar" and "subscribe to every sporting organisation". The seat was won by Labor candidate Bill Hodson upon his retirement.

Shields was married twice, to Catherine Williams on 1 June 1908, and on 16 April 1940 to Dorothy Margaret Hart. Shields died suddenly at Kew in September 1956, and was cremated at Springvale Crematorium.

Victorian Legislative Assembly
| Preceded by Jessie Satchell | Member for Castlemaine and Kyneton; 1932–1940 | Succeeded by Bill Hodson |
