= Electoral district of Benalla =

Former state electoral district of Victoria, Australia

Benalla Victoria—Legislative Assembly
- State: Victoria
- Created: 1904
- Abolished: 2014
- Electors: 36,987 (2010)
- Area: 17,120 km^{2} (6,610.1 sq mi)
- Demographic: Rural
- Coordinates: 36°56′S 146°03′E

Benalla was an electoral district of the Legislative Assembly in the Australian state of Victoria. The electorate covered a rural area of 17,120 km², and included the towns of Benalla, Bright, Eildon, Euroa, Mansfield, Mount Beauty, Murchison, Myrtleford, Nagambie and Violet Town. The electorate had a population of 47,675 as of the 2006 census, with 36,987 enrolled electors in the 2010 state election.

The seat was created in 1904. Historically a staunchly conservative rural district, it was held by conservative members for most of its history. It was held by various early conservative parties throughout the early 20th century, but became safe for the rural conservative National Party, which held the seat for all but nine years from 1920 to 2000.

This trend was briefly and unexpectedly broken in a 2000 by-election caused by the resignation of long-time National Party leader and former Deputy Premier Pat McNamara. In a major upset, Denise Allen became the first Labor member ever to win it. The seat's conservative nature, however, reasserted itself when Bill Sykes regained the seat for the Nationals at the 2002 election despite a landslide Labor victory which devastated the conservative parties across the state.

The seat reverted to form in the 2006 election, and Sykes held it without serious difficulty until his retirement after the 2014 election. Benalla was abolished at the same time, and was largely replaced with Euroa.

== Members for Benalla ==
Member	Party	Term
John Carlisle	Liberal	1904–1909
John Carlisle	Deakinite Liberal	1909–1917
John Carlisle	Economy	1917–1918
John Carlisle	Nationalist	1918–1920
John Carlisle	Farmers Union	1920
John Carlisle	Country	1920–1926
John Carlisle	Independent	1926–1927
Edward Cleary	Country Progressive	1927–1930
Edward Cleary	Country	1930–1936
Frederick Cook	Independent	1936–1939
Frederick Cook	Liberal Country	1939–1943
Frederick Cook	Country	1943–1961
Tom Trewin	Country	1961–1975
Tom Trewin	National Country	1975–1982
Pat McNamara	National	1982–2000
Denise Allen	Labor	2000–2002
Bill Sykes	National	2002–2014

== Election results ==
2010 Victorian state election: Benalla
Party	Candidate	Votes	%	±%
National	Bill Sykes	21,072	63.28	+21.15
Labor	Rowena Allen	6,124	18.39	−6.81
Greens	Kammy Cordner Hunt	2,756	8.28	+1.18
Country Alliance	Rochelle Hunt	2,546	7.65	+7.65
Independent	Nicholas Williams	804	2.41	+2.41
Total formal votes		33,302	95.97	−0.50
Informal votes		1,398	4.03	+0.50
Turnout		34,700	93.82	+0.67
Two-party-preferred result
National	Bill Sykes	24,354	73.06	+5.55
Labor	Rowena Allen	8,978	26.94	−5.55
National hold		Swing	+5.55	
