= Pat McNamara (Australian politician) =

Australian politician

The Honourable Pat McNamara AM

24th Deputy Premier of Victoria
- In office 6 October 1992 – 21 October 1999
- Premier: Jeff Kennett
- Preceded by: Jim Kennan
- Succeeded by: John Thwaites

Member of the Victorian Parliament for Benalla
- In office 3 April 1982 – 12 April 2000
- Preceded by: Tom Trewin
- Succeeded by: Denise Allen

Personal details
- Born: 11 August 1949 (age 76) Melbourne
- Party: Nationals
- Profession: Politician

Patrick John McNamara AM (born Melbourne, 11 August 1949) is a former Australian politician who was a member of the Victorian Legislative Assembly, representing Benalla for the National Party from 1982 to 2000. From 1988 to 1999, he was leader of the National Party in Victoria and was Deputy Premier of Victoria under Jeff Kennett from 1992 to 1999. He held several ministerial positions in the Kennett government, including Minister for Agriculture and Resources, Minister for Tourism, Minister for Police and Emergency Services and Minister for Corrections. During his tenure as Deputy Premier, Kennett's Liberals actually held a majority in their own right. Although Kennett did not need the support of McNamara's Nationals, the coalition was retained.

Following the defeat of the Liberal-National coalition at the 1999 Victorian election, McNamara resigned the party leadership. A year later, he resigned from parliament, triggering a by-election which resulted in the Nationals losing the seat to the Labor Party.

McNamara was appointed as a Member of the Order of Australia in the 2023 King's Birthday Honours for "significant service to rowing, to the Parliament of Victoria, and to the community through a range of roles".

Victorian Legislative Assembly
Preceded by Tom Trewin	Member for Benalla; 1982–2000	Succeeded by Denise Allen
Party political offices
Preceded by Peter Ross-Edwards	Leader of the National Party in Victoria; 1988–1999	Succeeded by Peter Ryan
