= Frederick Cook (Australian politician) =

Australian politician

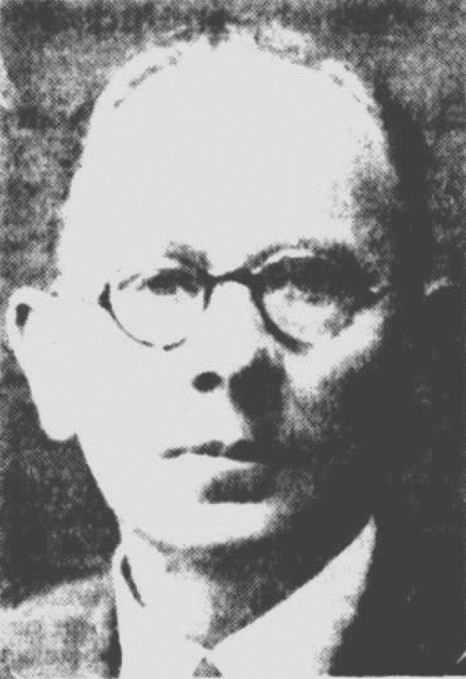
Frederick A. Cook.

Frederick Albert Cook, known by his second name Albert, (22 March 1883 – 23 December 1971) was an Australian politician.

He was born at Baddaginnie to storekeeper Frederick John Cook and Maria Dosser. After a state education he carried on his father's stores in Baddaginnie and Benalla. On 26 December 1915 he married Neva Garland Mowatt, with whom he had five children; a second marriage on 20 April 1943 to Kathleen Flora Curry produced two further children. He served on Benalla Shire Council from 1924 to 1964 and was twice president (1931–32, 1953–54).

In 1936 he was elected to the Victorian Legislative Assembly for Benalla as a United Australia Party-aligned independent. In 1939 he joined John McEwen's Liberal Country Party, and in 1943 joined the Country Party. He was party whip from 1955 to 1961, when he retired from politics. Cook died at Benalla in 1971.

Victorian Legislative Assembly
Preceded by Edward Cleary	Member for Benalla; 1936–1961	Succeeded by Tom Trewin
