= Alfred Downward =

Australian politician

Alfred Downward (c. 1847 – 26 June 1930) was an Australian politician.

Born in Melbourne to Edward and Elizabeth Downward, he was educated at Prahran and Mornington before working on his father's Balnarring sheep farm. From 1874, he had his own property and was highly involved in settlement on the Mornington Peninsula. In 1879, he married Josephine Kerr at Hawthorn, with whom he had seven children.

He was a member of Flinders and Kangerong Shire Council for twenty-five years, serving as president from 1890 to 1892, and was also a Mornington Shire Councillor and president.

He was elected to the Victorian Legislative Assembly for Mornington in 1894, serving until 1929. He was Minister for Water Supply and Agriculture (1908–09), Minister of Mines, Forests and Public Health (1917–18), and Minister for Immigration (1924–27). Downward died in Mornington in 1930.
