= Electoral district of Castlemaine and Kyneton =

Former electoral district of the Victorian Legislative Assembly, Australia

Coordinates: 37°10′S 144°20′E

Castlemaine and Kyneton Victoria—Legislative Assembly
- State: Victoria
- Created: 1927
- Abolished: 1945
- Demographic: Rural

The Electoral district of Castlemaine and Kyneton was an electoral district of the Victorian Legislative Assembly (Australia).

== History ==
Castlemaine Boroughs was created in 1856 and abolished in 1859. It was replaced by Castlemaine in 1859 which was itself abolished in 1904. Then Castlemaine and Maldon was created in 1904 and abolished in 1927, Harry Lawson was the member for its entire existence and was the first member for Castlemaine and Kyneton.

== Members for Castlemaine and Kyneton ==
Member	Party	Term
Harry Lawson	Nationalist	1927–1928
Walter Langslow	Nationalist	1929
Jessie Satchell	Labor	1929–1932
Clive Shields	United Aust.	1932–1940
Bill Hodson	Labor	1940–1945

== See also ==
- Parliaments of the Australian states and territories
- List of members of the Victorian Legislative Assembly
