= Bill Hodson =

Australian politician

William David Hodson (20 February 1891 – 12 July 1971) was an Australian politician.

He was born in Buxton to farmer John Hodson and Elizabeth Scott. He attended state schools and served with the Field Ambulance during World War I, in which he was wounded. On 27 September 1919 he married Margaret Pritchard Phillips, with whom he had four children. After the war he became a foreman for the Forestry Department, and from around 1925 worked as a postal linesman. In 1940 he was elected to the Victorian Legislative Assembly as the Labor member for Castlemaine and Kyneton. He held the seat until its abolition in 1945. Hodson died in Bundoora in 1971.

Victorian Legislative Assembly
Preceded by Clive Shields	Member for Castlemaine and Kyneton; 1940–1945	Abolished
