= Electoral district of Port Fairy and Glenelg =

Former state electoral district of Victoria, Australia

Port Fairy and Glenelg Victoria—Legislative Assembly
- State: Victoria
- Created: 1927
- Abolished: 1945
- Demographic: Rural

The electoral district of Port Fairy and Glenelg was an electorate of the Victorian Legislative Assembly in the Australian state of Victoria. Created in 1927 by the amalgamation of Port Fairy and Glenelg, Ernie Bond was the last member for Glenelg and the first for Port Fairy and Glenelg. The electorate was abolished in 1945.

== Members for Port Fairy and Glenelg ==
Member	Party	Term
Ernie Bond	Labor Party	1927–1932
Ernie Bond	Independent	1932–1938
Ernie Bond	Labor Party	1938–1943
Harry Hedditch	United Country Party	1943–1945
