= Electoral district of Mornington =

State electoral district of Victoria, Australia

Mornington Victoria—Legislative Assembly
- Interactive map of electoral district boundaries from the 2022 state election
- State: Victoria
- Dates current: 1859–1967; 1985–present
- MP: Chris Crewther
- Party: Liberal
- Namesake: Mornington
- Electors: 47,184 (2018)
- Area: 155 km^{2} (59.8 sq mi)
- Demographic: Outer metropolitan and rural fringe
- Coordinates: 38°15′S 145°04′E
Electorates around Mornington:
Port Phillip	Frankston	Hastings
Port Phillip	Mornington	Hastings
Nepean	Nepean	Hastings

The electoral district of Mornington is an electoral district of the Victorian Legislative Assembly. The electorate can be described as outer metropolitan and rural, including animal farming, grape production and wineries. The district is 155 square kilometres in area.

It was first created in 1859 when the Electoral district of Evelyn and Mornington was abolished and split in two. The district of Mornington initially included the entire Mornington Peninsula, Phillip Island and French Island. Currently it includes Mornington, Mount Eliza, Mount Martha and Tuerong, and parts of Baxter and Moorooduc.

Mornington has been held by the Liberal Party since it was re-created in 1985. Since 2022, the member for Mornington is Chris Crewther, who previously held the overlapping federal seat of Dunkley from 2016 to 2019.

== Members for Mornington ==
First incarnation (1859–1967)
Member	Party	Term
William Lyall	Unaligned	1859–1861
Henry Samuel Chapman	Unaligned	1861–1862
Sir James McCulloch	Unaligned	1862–1872
James Purves	Unaligned	1872–1880
James Gibb	Unaligned	1880–1886
Louis Smith	Unaligned	1886–1894
Alfred Downward	Unaligned	1894–1929
Herbert Downward	Country	1929–1932
Alfred Kirton	United Australia	1932–1947
Alfred Kirton	Country	1932–1947
William Leggatt	Liberal	1947–1956
Roberts Dunstan	Liberal	1956–1967
Second incarnation (1985–present)
Member	Party	Term
Robin Cooper	Liberal	1985–2006
David Morris	Liberal	2006–2022
Chris Crewther	Liberal	2022–present

== Election results ==
2022 Victorian state election: Mornington
Party	Candidate	Votes	%	±%
Liberal	Chris Crewther	17,910	42.58	−8.01
Independent	Kate Lardner	9,432	22.42	+22.42
Labor	Georgia Fowler	9,246	21.98	−12.30
Greens	Harry Sinclair	2,677	6.38	−3.42
Freedom	Paul Pettitt	1,041	2.47	+2.47
Animal Justice	Leonie Schween	740	1.76	−3.57
Independent	Jane Agirtan	641	1.52	+1.52
Family First	Ross Hayward	375	0.89	+0.89
Total formal votes		42,062	95.85	+0.38
Informal votes		1,823	4.15	−0.38
Turnout		43,885	91.34	−0.64
Notional two-party-preferred count
Liberal	Chris Crewther	24,514	58.28	+3.28
Labor	Georgia Fowler	17,548	41.72	−3.28
Two-candidate-preferred result
Liberal	Chris Crewther	21,326	50.70	−4.30
Independent	Kate Lardner	20,736	49.30	+49.30
Liberal hold		Swing	N/A	

== Historical maps ==
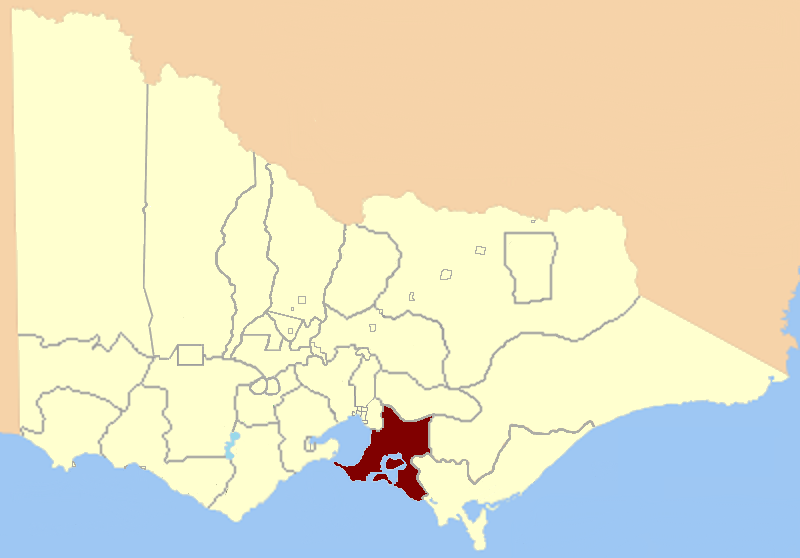
Location of Mornington district in 1859
