= Alfred Kirton =

Australian politician

Alfred James Kirton (14 April 1877 – 20 April 1960) was an Australian politician.

Kirton was born in Ballarat to bookmaker Emanuel Kirton and Jane Milburn. He left school at the age of twelve to work for a draper, and from the age of fifteen worked in a Melbourne warehouse. Around 1901 he married Edith Augusta Pope, with whom he had two daughters; he would remarry in 1911, to Alice Emily Rouvray, with whom he had a further three children. He ran a bakery in Brunswick from 1913 until 1921, when he retired to Mornington. He served on Mornington Shire Council from 1926 to 1952 and was twice president (1927–28, 1947–48).

In 1932 Kirton was elected to the Victorian Legislative Assembly as the United Australia Party member for Mornington. He defected to the Country Party in 1939, and served until his retirement in 1947. His brother Joseph also served in the Assembly. Kirton died in Mornington in 1960.

Victorian Legislative Assembly
Preceded by Herbert Downward	Member for Mornington; 1932–1947	Succeeded by William Leggatt
