= Ernie Bond (politician) =

Australian politician

Ernest Edward "Ernie" Bond (29 June 1897 – 25 July 1984) was an Australian politician.

== Biography ==
He was born in Heywood to rural worker Robert Bond and Sarah Jane Mullens. He attended Geelong High School and became a schoolteacher at Lavers Hill and Heywood, and then head teacher at Greenwald and Condah. On 20 July 1923 he married Ethel Thomas, with whom he had three children.

A member of the Labor Party's Heywood branch from the age of seventeen, he won a by-election for the Victorian Legislative Assembly seat of Glenelg in 1924; he transferred to Port Fairy and Glenelg in 1927. In 1932 he was expelled from the Labor Party over his support for the Premiers' Plan; he was re-elected as an independent and was readmitted to the Labor Party in 1937. He served until his retirement in 1943. Subsequently, he was a dairy farmer until 1964, when he retired to Portland. Bond died in Heywood in 1984.

Victorian Legislative Assembly
Preceded by William Thomas	Member for Glenelg; 1924–1927	Abolished
New seat	Member for Port Fairy and Glenelg; 1927–1940	Succeeded by Harry Hedditch
