= Liberal Country Party =

Australian splinter group of United Country Party

The Liberal Country Party (LCP) was a splinter group of the United Country Party, the Victorian branch of the Australian Country Party, formed after federal MP John McEwen was expelled from the state branch for accepting a ministry in the Lyons-Page Coalition government in 1937. Following a tumultuous party conference in 1938, another federal MP, Thomas Paterson, led a hundred McEwen supporters to form the LCP, a faction of the party loyal to the federal party. The breach had been resolved by 1943.
