= Electoral results for the district of Geelong =

Victoria, Australia, district election results

This is a list of electoral results for the Electoral district of Geelong in Victorian state elections.

== Members for Geelong ==
First incarnation (1856–1859, 4 members)
Member	Term	Member	Term	Member	Term	Member	Term
Sir Charles Sladen	1856–1857	Alexander Fyfe	1856–1857	Charles Read	1856–1858	John Brooke	1856–1859
Alexander Thomson	1857–1859	George Board	1858–1859	James Harrison	1858–1859	John Brooke	1856–1859

Second incarnation (1877–1889, 3 members)
Member	Term	Member	Term	Member	Term
Charles Kernot	1877–1880	Robert de Bruce Johnstone	1877–1881	Sir Graham Berry	1877–1886
Charles Andrews Sr.	1880	Robert de Bruce Johnstone	1877–1881	Sir Graham Berry	1877–1886
Charles Kernot	1880–1882	George Cunningham	1881–1886	Sir Graham Berry	1877–1886
Joseph Connor	1882–1886	George Cunningham	1881–1886	Sir Graham Berry	1877–1886
John Donaghy	1886–1889	James Munro	1886–1889	Charles Andrews Sr.	1886–1889

Third incarnation (1889–1904, 2 members)
Member		Party	Term
James Munro	1889–1892	Charles Andrews Sr.	1889–1894
John Rout Hopkins	1892–1894	Charles Andrews Sr.	1889–1894
H. B. Higgins	1894–1900	William Gurr	1894–1902
Charles Andrews Jr.	1900–1904	George Martin	1902–1904

Fourth incarnation (1904–1976, 1 member)
Member	Party	Term
William Colechin	Labor	1904–1907
William Gurr	Ministerialist	1907–1908
William Plain	Labor	1908–1916
William Plain	Nationalist	1916–1917
Robert Purnell	Nationalist	1917–1920
William Brownbill	Labor	1920–1932
Edward Austin	United Australia	1932–1935
William Brownbill	Labor	1935–1938
Fanny Brownbill	Labor	1938–1948
Edward Montgomery	Liberal	1948–1950
James Dunn	Labor	1950–1955
Sir Thomas Maltby	Liberal	1955–1961
Hayden Birrell	Liberal	1961–1976
Fifth incarnation (1985–present, 1 member)
Member	Party	Term
Hayden Shell	Labor	1985–1992
Ann Henderson	Liberal	1992–1999
Ian Trezise	Labor	1999–2014
Christine Couzens	Labor	2014–present

== Election results ==
=== Elections in the 2020s ===
2022 Victorian state election: Geelong
Party	Candidate	Votes	%	±%
Labor	Christine Couzens	20,754	46.4	+4.5
Liberal	James Bennett-Hullin	12,194	27.2	+5.3
Greens	Aleisha Smith	6,849	15.3	+6.3
Family First	Madeleine Parker-Hill	2,051	4.6	+4.6
Animal Justice	Bob Motta	1,465	3.3	+0.2
Ind. (Socialist Alliance)	Angela Carr	994	2.2	+2.2
Independent	Stephen Juhasz	455	1.0	+1.0
Total formal votes		44,762	95.9	+0.4
Informal votes		1,918	4.1	−0.4
Turnout		46,680	89.1	−1.1
Two-party-preferred result
Labor	Christine Couzens	28,965	64.7	+4.4
Liberal	James Bennett-Hullin	15,797	35.3	−4.4
Labor hold		Swing	+4.4	

=== Elections in the 2010s ===
2018 Victorian state election: Geelong
Party	Candidate	Votes	%	±%
Labor	Christine Couzens	16,680	40.37	−0.66
Independent	Darryn Lyons	10,194	24.67	+24.67
Liberal	Freya Fidge	8,327	20.15	−17.68
Greens	Lois Newman	3,922	9.49	−2.51
Animal Justice	Jacki Jacka	1,173	2.84	+2.84
Victorian Socialists	Sarah Hathway	464	1.12	−0.04
Independent	Gottfried Wolf	300	0.73	+0.73
Independent	Stephen Juhasz	256	0.62	+0.62
Total formal votes		41,316	95.49	+0.27
Informal votes		1,950	4.51	−0.27
Turnout		43,266	90.94	−2.95
Two-party-preferred result
Labor	Christine Couzens	24,847	60.14	+4.11
Liberal	Freya Fidge	16,469	39.86	−4.11
Two-candidate-preferred result
Labor	Christine Couzens	23,250	56.23	+0.20
Independent	Darryn Lyons	18,098	43.77	+43.77
Labor hold		Swing	N/A	

2014 Victorian state election: Geelong
Party	Candidate	Votes	%	±%
Labor	Christine Couzens	16,516	41.0	−1.3
Liberal	Paula Kontelj	15,232	37.8	−2.3
Greens	Bruce Lindsay	4,833	12.0	+1.2
Shooters and Fishers	Pedro Pegan	1,021	2.5	+2.5
Family First	Ruth Clark	962	2.4	+0.3
Independent	Douglas Mann	659	1.6	+1.6
Country Alliance	Tony Leen	564	1.4	+0.0
Socialist Alliance	Sarah Hathway	468	1.2	+0.9
Total formal votes		40,255	95.2	−0.2
Informal votes		2,020	4.8	+0.2
Turnout		42,275	93.9	−3.1
Two-party-preferred result
Labor	Christine Couzens	22,556	56.0	+2.1
Liberal	Paula Kontelj	17,699	44.0	−2.1
Labor hold		Swing	+2.1	

2010 Victorian state election: Geelong
Party	Candidate	Votes	%	±%
Liberal	Alastair Thomson	15,472	43.01	+7.66
Labor	Ian Trezise	14,809	41.17	−7.82
Greens	Bruce Lindsay	4,131	11.48	+2.38
Family First	Len Lengyel	688	1.91	−2.92
Independent	Samantha Schultz	444	1.23	+1.23
Country Alliance	Matthew Schmidt	430	1.20	+1.20
Total formal votes		35,974	95.93	−0.37
Informal votes		1,528	4.07	+0.37
Turnout		37,502	93.61	+1.56
Two-party-preferred result
Labor	Ian Trezise	18,702	51.98	−6.35
Liberal	Alastair Thomson	17,275	48.02	+6.35
Labor hold		Swing	−6.35	

=== Elections in the 2000s ===
2006 Victorian state election: Geelong
Party	Candidate	Votes	%	±%
Labor	Ian Trezise	17,069	48.99	−1.61
Liberal	Scott Dixon	12,317	35.35	−2.62
Greens	Bruce Lindsay	3,169	9.10	+1.75
Family First	Gary Plumridge	1,684	4.83	+4.83
People Power	Elsie Teer	603	1.73	+1.73
Total formal votes		34,842	96.30	−0.53
Informal votes		1,339	3.70	+0.53
Turnout		36,181	92.05	−1.73
Two-party-preferred result
Labor	Ian Trezise	20,213	58.33	+0.23
Liberal	Scott Dixon	14,441	41.67	−0.23
Labor hold		Swing	+0.23	

2002 Victorian state election: Geelong
Party	Candidate	Votes	%	±%
Labor	Ian Trezise	17,680	50.6	+5.3
Liberal	Stretch Kontelj	13,266	38.0	−10.5
Greens	Elsie Teer	2,568	7.3	+7.3
Independent	Miles Hodge	967	2.8	+2.8
Independent	Andrea Battistella	233	0.7	+0.7
Independent	Richard Nixon	228	0.7	+0.7
Total formal votes		34,942	96.8	−0.5
Informal votes		1,145	3.2	+0.5
Turnout		36,087	93.8	
Two-party-preferred result
Labor	Ian Trezise	20,300	58.1	+8.5
Liberal	Stretch Kontelj	14,638	41.9	−8.5
Labor gain from Liberal		Swing	+8.5	

=== Elections in the 1990s ===
1999 Victorian state election: Geelong
Party	Candidate	Votes	%	±%
Liberal	Ann Henderson	14,719	47.5	−5.1
Labor	Ian Trezise	14,001	45.2	+0.1
Independent	Rosemary Faris	1,292	4.2	+4.2
Independent	Luke Grose	641	2.1	+2.1
Independent	John O'Dea	331	1.1	+1.1
Total formal votes		30,984	97.5	−0.3
Informal votes		802	2.5	+0.3
Turnout		31,786	94.0	−0.3
Two-party-preferred result
Labor	Ian Trezise	15,500	50.03	+3.5
Liberal	Ann Henderson	15,484	49.97	−3.5
Labor gain from Liberal		Swing	+3.5	

1996 Victorian state election: Geelong
Party	Candidate	Votes	%	±%
Liberal	Ann Henderson	16,543	52.6	+6.8
Labor	Philip Wight	14,171	45.1	+4.2
Natural Law	Robert Nieuwenhuis	731	2.3	+2.3
Total formal votes		31,445	97.8	+0.6
Informal votes		705	2.2	−0.6
Turnout		32,150	94.3	−0.6
Two-party-preferred result
Liberal	Ann Henderson	16,818	53.5	+2.8
Labor	Philip Wight	14,615	46.5	−2.8
Liberal hold		Swing	+2.8	

1992 Victorian state election: Geelong
Party	Candidate	Votes	%	±%
Liberal	Ann Henderson	14,388	45.8	+1.9
Labor	Hayden Shell	12,848	40.9	−8.9
Geelong Community	Roger Kent	4,201	13.4	+13.4
Total formal votes		31,437	97.2	+0.3
Informal votes		914	2.8	−0.3
Turnout		32,351	94.9	
Two-party-preferred result
Liberal	Ann Henderson	15,890	50.7	+3.3
Labor	Hayden Shell	15,478	49.3	−3.3
Liberal gain from Labor		Swing	+3.3	

=== Elections in the 1980s ===
1988 Victorian state election: Geelong
Party	Candidate	Votes	%	±%
Labor	Hayden Shell	13,276	50.01	−6.05
Liberal	Ann Henderson	11,876	44.74	+0.80
Call to Australia	Ian Winter	1,394	5.25	+5.25
Total formal votes		26,546	97.15	−0.54
Informal votes		778	2.85	+0.54
Turnout		27,324	91.80	−0.97
Two-party-preferred result
Labor	Hayden Shell	13,941	52.52	−3.54
Liberal	Ann Henderson	12,601	47.48	+3.54
Labor hold		Swing	−3.54	

1985 Victorian state election: Geelong
Party	Candidate	Votes	%	±%
Labor	Hayden Shell	15,946	56.1	+4.6
Liberal	Clive Pugh	12,501	43.9	+2.7
Total formal votes		28,447	97.7	
Informal votes		672	2.3	
Turnout		29,119	92.8	
Labor hold		Swing	+1.2	

=== Elections in the 1970s ===
1973 Victorian state election: Geelong
Party	Candidate	Votes	%	±%
Liberal	Hayden Birrell	11,481	49.1	+3.3
Labor	John O'Brien	9,211	39.4	−1.4
Democratic Labor	John Timberlake	1,882	8.1	−5.4
Australia	Guenter Sahr	790	3.4	+3.4
Total formal votes		23,364	97.8	−0.1
Informal votes		531	2.2	+0.1
Turnout		23,895	93.2	−1.9
Two-party-preferred result
Liberal	Hayden Birrell	13,619	58.3	+0.3
Labor	John O'Brien	9,745	41.7	−0.3
Liberal hold		Swing	+0.3	

1970 Victorian state election: Geelong
Party	Candidate	Votes	%	±%
Liberal	Hayden Birrell	9,823	45.8	−2.5
Labor	John Woolfe	8,741	40.8	+2.4
Democratic Labor	John Timberlake	2,884	13.4	+0.1
Total formal votes		21,448	97.9	+0.2
Informal votes		468	2.1	−0.2
Turnout		21,916	95.1	+1.0
Two-party-preferred result
Liberal	Hayden Birrell	12,439	58.0	−1.6
Labor	John Woolfe	9,009	42.0	+1.6
Liberal hold		Swing	−1.6	

=== Elections in the 1960s ===
1967 Victorian state election: Geelong
Party	Candidate	Votes	%	±%
Liberal	Hayden Birrell	9,983	48.3	+0.8
Labor	Ronald McKenzie	7,944	38.4	−0.2
Democratic Labor	John Timberlake	2,761	13.4	−0.5
Total formal votes		20,688	97.7	
Informal votes		485	2.3	
Turnout		21,173	94.1	
Two-party-preferred result
Liberal	Hayden Birrell	12,326	59.6	−0.3
Labor	Ronald McKenzie	8,362	40.4	+0.3
Liberal hold		Swing	−0.3	

1964 Victorian state election: Geelong
Party	Candidate	Votes	%	±%
Liberal and Country	Hayden Birrell	10,266	48.5	+2.3
Labor	Robert Robertson	8,180	38.7	+0.7
Democratic Labor	Desmond Guinane	2,698	12.8	−3.0
Total formal votes		21,144	98.3	+0.3
Informal votes		356	1.7	−0.3
Turnout		21,500	95.5	+1.7
Two-party-preferred result
Liberal and Country	Hayden Birrell	12,678	60.0	+0.8
Labor	Robert Robertson	8,466	40.0	−0.8
Liberal and Country hold		Swing	+0.8	

1961 Victorian state election: Geelong
Party	Candidate	Votes	%	±%
Liberal and Country	Hayden Birrell	9,241	46.2	+2.8
Labor	William King	7,590	38.0	+0.1
Democratic Labor	William Mithen	3,159	15.8	+3.9
Total formal votes		19,990	98.0	−0.7
Informal votes		411	2.0	+0.7
Turnout		20,401	93.8	+1.0
Two-party-preferred result
Liberal and Country	Hayden Birrell	11,839	59.2	+2.8
Labor	William King	8,151	40.8	−2.8
Liberal and Country hold		Swing	+2.8	

=== Elections in the 1950s ===
1958 Victorian state election: Geelong
Party	Candidate	Votes	%	±%
Liberal and Country	Thomas Maltby	8,444	43.4	
Labor	George Poyser	7,371	37.9	
Democratic Labor	George Taylor	2,305	11.9	
Independent	Albert Woodward	1,313	6.8	
Total formal votes		19,433	98.7	
Informal votes		255	1.3	
Turnout		19,688	92.8	
Two-party-preferred result
Liberal and Country	Thomas Maltby	10,954	56.4	
Labor	George Poyser	8,479	43.6	
Liberal and Country hold		Swing		

1955 Victorian state election: Geelong
Party	Candidate	Votes	%	±%
Liberal and Country	Thomas Maltby	11,172	51.5	
Labor	George Poyser	8,069	37.2	
Independent	Norman Mackay	1,358	6.3	
Victorian Liberal	Charles Plummer	1,081	5.0	
Total formal votes		21,680	98.0	
Informal votes		436	2.0	
Turnout		22,116	93.7	
Two-party-preferred result
Liberal and Country	Thomas Maltby	13,367	61.7	
Labor	George Poyser	8,313	38.3	
Liberal and Country gain from Labor		Swing		

1952 Victorian state election: Geelong
Party	Candidate	Votes	%	±%
Labor	James Dunn	13,684	69.8	+13.9
Liberal and Country	Geoffrey Thom	5,929	30.2	−13.9
Total formal votes		19,613	98.9	−0.7
Informal votes		215	1.1	+0.7
Turnout		19,828	93.3	−1.8
Labor hold		Swing	+13.9	

1950 Victorian state election: Geelong
Party	Candidate	Votes	%	±%
Labor	James Dunn	11,405	55.9	−2.0
Liberal and Country	Edward Montgomery	9,014	44.1	+2.0
Total formal votes		20,419	99.6	+0.3
Informal votes		90	0.4	−0.3
Turnout		20,509	95.1	+0.7
Labor hold		Swing	−2.0	

=== Elections in the 1940s ===
1948 Geelong state by-election
Party	Candidate	Votes	%	±%
Liberal	Edward Montgomery	9,659	49.6	+7.5
Labor	M J Travers	8,777	45.1	−12.8
Communist	S Baker	1,045	5.4	+5.4
Total formal votes		19,481	97.4	−1.9
Informal votes		529	2.6	+1.9
Turnout		20,010	91.9	−2.5
Two-party-preferred result
Liberal	Edward Montgomery	10,147	52.1	+10.0
Labor	M. J. Travers	9,334	47.9	−10.0
Liberal gain from Labor		Swing	+10.0	

1947 Victorian state election: Geelong
Party	Candidate	Votes	%	±%
Labor	Fanny Brownbill	11,852	57.9	−42.1
Liberal	Edward Montgomery	8,623	42.1	+42.1
Total formal votes		20,475	99.3	
Informal votes		152	0.7	
Turnout		20,627	94.4	
Labor hold		Swing	N/A	

1945 Victorian state election: Geelong
Party	Candidate	Votes	%	±%
Labor	Fanny Brownbill	unopposed		
Labor hold		Swing		

1943 Victorian state election: Geelong
Party	Candidate	Votes	%	±%
Labor	Fanny Brownbill	unopposed		
Labor hold		Swing		

1940 Victorian state election: Geelong
Party	Candidate	Votes	%	±%
Labor	Fanny Brownbill	12,456	67.3	−32.7
United Australia	Nathaniel White	6,041	32.7	+32.7
Total formal votes		18,497	99.4	
Informal votes		117	0.6	
Turnout		18,614	95.4	
Labor hold		Swing	N/A	

=== Elections in the 1930s ===
1938 Geelong state by-election
Party	Candidate	Votes	%	±%
Labor	Fanny Brownbill	10,523	58.3	−41.7
United Australia	Robert Weddell	7,526	41.7	+41.7
Total formal votes		18,049	99.0	
Informal votes		181	1.0	
Turnout		18,230	94.8	
Labor hold		Swing	N/A	

1937 Victorian state election: Geelong
Party	Candidate	Votes	%	±%
Labor	William Brownbill	unopposed		
Labor hold		Swing		

1935 Victorian state election: Geelong
Party	Candidate	Votes	%	±%
Labor	William Brownbill	9,567	54.1	+10.5
United Australia	Edward Austin	8,112	45.9	+13.2
Total formal votes		17,679	99.1	+0.3
Informal votes		157	0.9	−0.3
Turnout		17,836	95.6	+0.3
Labor gain from United Australia		Swing	+6.0	

1932 Victorian state election: Geelong
Party	Candidate	Votes	%	±%
Labor	William Brownbill	7,403	43.6	−19.8
United Australia	Edward Austin	5,540	32.7	−3.9
Independent	John Lister	4,027	23.7	+23.7
Total formal votes		16,970	98.8	−0.3
Informal votes		204	1.2	+0.3
Turnout		17,174	95.3	−0.2
Two-party-preferred result
United Australia	Edward Austin	8,815	51.9	+15.3
Labor	William Brownbill	8,155	48.1	−15.3
United Australia gain from Labor		Swing	+15.3	

=== Elections in the 1920s ===
1929 Victorian state election: Geelong
Party	Candidate	Votes	%	±%
Labor	William Brownbill	10,667	63.4	+6.1
Nationalist	Sidney Dickins	6,159	36.6	−6.1
Total formal votes		16,826	99.1	+0.1
Informal votes		158	0.9	−0.1
Turnout		16,984	95.5	+2.3
Labor hold		Swing	+6.1	

1927 Victorian state election: Geelong
Party	Candidate	Votes	%	±%
Labor	William Brownbill	9,317	57.3	
Nationalist	Julius Solomon	6,940	42.7	
Total formal votes		16,257	99.0	
Informal votes		160	1.0	
Turnout		16,417	93.2	
Labor hold		Swing		

1924 Victorian state election: Geelong
Party	Candidate	Votes	%	±%
Labor	William Brownbill	6,197	55.6	+0.8
Nationalist	Thomas Maltby	4,943	44.4	−0.8
Total formal votes		11,140	99.7	+0.4
Informal votes		37	0.3	−0.4
Turnout		11,177	72.5	+7.3
Labor hold		Swing	+0.8	

1921 Victorian state election: Geelong
Party	Candidate	Votes	%	±%
Labor	William Brownbill	5,316	54.8	−1.8
Nationalist	William Thwaites	4,391	45.2	+1.8
Total formal votes		9,707	99.3	+4.0
Informal votes		73	0.7	−4.0
Turnout		9,780	65.2	−9.3
Labor hold		Swing	−1.8	

1920 Victorian state election: Geelong
Party	Candidate	Votes	%	±%
Labor	William Brownbill	5,839	56.6	+7.4
Nationalist	Robert Purnell	4,471	43.4	−7.4
Total formal votes		10,310	95.3	−2.3
Informal votes		513	4.7	+2.3
Turnout		10,823	74.5	+5.6
Labor gain from Nationalist		Swing	+7.4	

=== Elections in the 1910s ===
1917 Victorian state election: Geelong
Party	Candidate	Votes	%	±%
Nationalist	Robert Purnell	4,868	50.8	
Labor	William Brownbill	4,717	49.2	
Total formal votes		9,585	97.6	
Informal votes		234	2.4	
Turnout		9,819	68.9	
Nationalist gain from Labor		Swing	N/A	

1917 Geelong state by-election
Party	Candidate	Votes	%	±%
Nationalist	Robert Purnell	5,163	55.0	
Labor	Thomas McCormick	4,220	45.0	
Total formal votes		9,383	97.3	
Informal votes		265	2.7	
Turnout		9,648	70.2	
Nationalist gain from Labor		Swing	N/A	

1914 Victorian state election: Geelong
Party	Candidate	Votes	%	±%
Labor	William Plain	unopposed		
Labor hold		Swing		

1911 Victorian state election: Geelong
Party	Candidate	Votes	%	±%
Labor	William Plain	5,026	59.4	+4.0
Liberal	Albyn Morley	3,431	40.6	+26.2
Total formal votes		8,457	99.4	−0.3
Informal votes		52	0.6	+0.3
Turnout		8,509	73.9	+17.1
Labor hold		Swing	N/A	
