= Results of the 1950 Victorian state election (Legislative Assembly) =

Australian state election results

Victorian state election, 13 May 1950 Legislative Assembly << 1947–1952 >>
Enrolled voters	1,294,159				
Votes cast	1,221,734		Turnout	94.40	+0.96
Informal votes	13,901		Informal	1.14	−0.19
Summary of votes by party
Party	Primary votes	%	Swing	Seats	Change
Labor	546,978	45.29	+4.42	24	+8
Liberal and Country	491,448	40.69	+3.53	27	−3
Country	128,537	10.64	−4.28	13	−3
Communist	6,308	0.52	+0.39	0	±0
Independent	34,562	2.86	−4.06	1	±0
Total	1,207,833			65	

This is a list of electoral district results for the Victorian 1950 election.

== Results by electoral district ==
=== Albert Park ===
1950 Victorian state election: Albert Park
Party	Candidate	Votes	%	±%
Labor	Keith Sutton	11,807	51.3	+2.5
Liberal and Country	Roy Schilling	11,230	48.7	−2.5
Total formal votes		23,037	99.1	−0.1
Informal votes		199	0.9	+0.1
Turnout		23,244	90.7	+1.1
Labor gain from Liberal and Country		Swing	+2.5	

=== Allandale ===
1950 Victorian state election: Allandale
Party	Candidate	Votes	%	±%
Labor	Stanley Glover	6,274	43.1	+1.8
Country	Russell White	4,973	34.2	−7.1
Liberal and Country	Thomas Grigg	3,314	22.8	+4.4
Total formal votes		14,561	99.3	−0.1
Informal votes		109	0.7	+0.1
Turnout		14,670	95.7	+0.3
Two-party-preferred result
Country	Russell White	8,058	55.3	−1.5
Labor	Stanley Glover	6,503	44.7	+1.5
Country hold		Swing	−1.5	

=== Ballarat ===
1950 Victorian state election: Ballarat
Party	Candidate	Votes	%	±%
Liberal and Country	Thomas Hollway	10,646	51.2	−3.0
Labor	John Sheehan	9,735	46.8	+1.0
Independent	Albert Nicholls	421	2.0	+2.0
Total formal votes		20,802	99.2	0.0
Informal votes		163	0.8	0.0
Two-party-preferred result
Liberal and Country	Thomas Hollway	11,025	53.0	−1.2
Labor	John Sheehan	9,777	47.0	+1.2
Liberal and Country hold		Swing	−1.2	

=== Barwon ===
1950 Victorian state election: Barwon
Party	Candidate	Votes	%	±%
Liberal and Country	Thomas Maltby	unopposed		
Liberal and Country hold		Swing		

=== Benalla ===
1950 Victorian state election: Benalla
Party	Candidate	Votes	%	±%
Country	Frederick Cook	7,466	59.1	−8.2
Liberal and Country	Jack Pennington	5,174	40.9	+8.2
Total formal votes		12,640	97.3	+1.0
Informal votes		348	2.7	−1.0
Turnout		12,988	94.2	+1.2
Country hold		Swing	−8.2	

=== Benambra ===
1950 Victorian state election: Benambra
Party	Candidate	Votes	%	±%
Country	Tom Mitchell	9,050	74.0	−26.0
Liberal and Country	James Ronan	3,187	26.0	+26.0
Total formal votes		12,237	97.9	
Informal votes		264	2.1	
Turnout		12,501	92.2	
Country hold		Swing	N/A	

=== Bendigo ===
1950 Victorian state election: Bendigo
Party	Candidate	Votes	%	±%
Labor	Bill Galvin	12,633	59.2	+2.8
Liberal and Country	Harold Every	8,724	40.8	+7.8
Total formal votes		21,357	99.3	0.0
Informal votes		158	0.7	0.0
Turnout		21,515	96.2	+1.0
Labor hold		Swing	+1.7	

=== Borung ===
1950 Victorian state election: Borung
Party	Candidate	Votes	%	±%
Liberal and Country	Wilfred Mibus	7,354	56.4	+56.4
Country	Rupert Levitzke	5,644	43.6	−20.9
Total formal votes		13,031	99.1	0.0
Informal votes		123	0.9	0.0
Turnout		13,154	96.1	−0.1
Liberal and Country gain from Country		Swing	N/A	

=== Box Hill ===
1950 Victorian state election: Box Hill
Party	Candidate	Votes	%	±%
Liberal and Country	George Reid	15,942	55.4	+11.2
Labor	Bob Gray	12,819	44.6	+5.8
Total formal votes		28,761	99.2	+0.2
Informal votes		220	0.8	−0.2
Turnout		28,981	94.4	+0.7
Liberal and Country hold		Swing	−3.0	

=== Brighton ===
1950 Victorian state election: Brighton
Party	Candidate	Votes	%	±%
Liberal and Country	Ray Tovell	unopposed		
Liberal and Country hold		Swing		

=== Brunswick ===
1950 Victorian state election: Brunswick
Party	Candidate	Votes	%	±%
Labor	Peter Randles	16,626	71.0	+4.4
Liberal and Country	Bruce Cann	6,805	29.0	−4.4
Total formal votes		23,431	98.6	+0.1
Informal votes		342	1.4	−0.1
Turnout		23,773	94.8	+0.6
Labor hold		Swing	+4.4	

=== Camberwell ===
1950 Victorian state election: Camberwell
Party	Candidate	Votes	%	±%
Liberal and Country	Robert Whately	16,390	65.1	−2.1
Labor	John Stewart	8,788	34.9	+34.9
Total formal votes		25,178	99.3	+2.8
Informal votes		182	0.7	−2.8
Turnout		25,360	93.7	+1.9
Liberal and Country hold		Swing	N/A	

=== Carlton ===
1950 Victorian state election: Carlton
Party	Candidate	Votes	%	±%
Labor	Bill Barry	17,692	74.3	+7.3
Liberal and Country	Frank Block	6,124	25.7	−7.3
Total formal votes		23,816	98.2	+0.3
Informal votes		439	1.8	−0.3
Turnout		24,255	92.8	+0.9
Labor hold		Swing	+7.3	

=== Caulfield ===
1950 Victorian state election: Caulfield
Party	Candidate	Votes	%	±%
Liberal and Country	Alexander Dennett	13,816	63.9	−36.1
Labor	Daniel Elliston	7,814	36.1	+36.1
Total formal votes		21,630	99.1	
Informal votes		190	0.9	
Turnout		21,820	91.7	
Liberal and Country hold		Swing	N/A	

=== Clifton Hill ===
1950 Victorian state election: Clifton Hill
Party	Candidate	Votes	%	±%
Labor	Joseph O'Carroll	16,004	67.7	+4.0
Liberal and Country	Kenneth Withers	7,633	32.3	−4.0
Total formal votes		23,637	98.6	−0.2
Informal votes		331	1.4	+0.2
Turnout		23,968	94.3	+1.1
Labor hold		Swing	+4.0	

=== Coburg ===
1950 Victorian state election: Coburg
Party	Candidate	Votes	%	±%
Labor	Kevin Hayes	9,462	39.0	+10.4
Blackburn-Mutton Labor	Charlie Mutton	7,977	32.8	−5.7
Liberal and Country	John Morris	6,852	28.2	−4.6
Total formal votes		24,291	99.0	+0.3
Informal votes		236	1.0	−0.3
Turnout		24,527	95.7	+1.0
Two-candidate-preferred result
Blackburn-Mutton Labor	Charlie Mutton	14,085	58.0	−7.3
Labor	Kevin Hayes	10,206	42.0	+7.3
Blackburn-Mutton Labor hold		Swing	−7.3	

=== Collingwood ===
1950 Victorian state election: Collingwood
Party	Candidate	Votes	%	±%
Labor	Bill Towers	18,026	78.6	+5.2
Liberal and Country	Richard Taylor	4,918	21.4	−5.2
Total formal votes		22,944	98.2	+0.8
Informal votes		430	1.8	−0.8
Turnout		23,374	91.1	−0.4
Labor hold		Swing	+5.2	

=== Dandenong ===
1950 Victorian state election: Dandenong
Party	Candidate	Votes	%	±%
Liberal and Country	William Dawnay-Mould	16,521	50.2	+2.8
Labor	Les Coates	16,391	49.8	+5.9
Total formal votes		32,912	99.1	+0.5
Informal votes		302	0.9	−0.5
Turnout		33,214	94.6	+0.5
Liberal and Country hold		Swing	−5.0	

=== Dundas ===
1950 Victorian state election: Dundas
Party	Candidate	Votes	%	±%
Liberal and Country	William McDonald	6,828	47.4	−8.0
Labor	Joseph Toleman	6,039	42.0	−2.6
Country	Gilbert Kirsopp	1,524	10.6	+10.6
Total formal votes		14,391	99.2	−0.4
Informal votes		112	0.8	+0.4
Turnout		14,503	96.0	−0.1
Two-party-preferred result
Liberal and Country	William McDonald	8,059	56.0	+0.6
Labor	Joseph Toleman	6,332	44.0	−0.6
Liberal and Country hold		Swing	+0.6	

=== Elsternwick ===
1950 Victorian state election: Elsternwick
Party	Candidate	Votes	%	±%
Liberal and Country	John Don	12,932	60.8	−3.4
Labor	Harold Lorback	8,351	39.2	+3.4
Total formal votes		21,283	99.3	0.0
Informal votes		144	0.7	0.0
Turnout		21,427	93.2	+1.4
Liberal and Country hold		Swing	−3.4	

=== Essendon ===
1950 Victorian state election: Essendon
Party	Candidate	Votes	%	±%
Labor	George Fewster	13,725	49.1	−0.3
Liberal and Country	Allen Bateman	12,910	46.2	−4.4
Independent	Arthur Dodds	1,319	4.7	+4.7
Total formal votes		27,954	99.0	+0.1
Informal votes		287	1.0	−0.1
Turnout		28,241	95.3	+0.5
Two-party-preferred result
Labor	George Fewster	14,339	51.3	+1.9
Liberal and Country	Allen Bateman	13,615	48.7	−1.9
Labor gain from Liberal and Country		Swing	+1.9	

=== Evelyn ===
1950 Victorian state election: Evelyn
Party	Candidate	Votes	%	±%
Liberal and Country	Roland Leckie	8,466	53.8	−7.1
Labor	John Dunbar	5,413	34.4	−1.3
Independent	Clifford Wolfe	1,863	11.8	+11.8
Total formal votes		15,742	98.8	+0.3
Informal votes		187	1.2	−0.3
Turnout		15,929	93.3	0.0
Two-party-preferred result
Liberal and Country	Roland Leckie	8,653	55.0	−8.9
Labor	John Dunbar	7,089	45.0	+8.9
Liberal and Country hold		Swing	−8.9	

=== Footscray ===
1950 Victorian state election: Footscray
Party	Candidate	Votes	%	±%
Labor	Jack Holland	16,902	72.7	+0.8
Liberal and Country	Leonard Gordon	5,061	21.8	−6.3
Communist	John Arrowsmith	1,295	5.6	+5.6
Total formal votes		23,258	98.4	−0.4
Informal votes		378	1.6	+0.4
Turnout		23,636	94.3	+1.4
Two-party-preferred result
Labor	Jack Holland	18,067	77.7	+5.8
Liberal and Country	Leonard Gordon	5,191	22.3	−5.8
Labor hold		Swing	+5.8	

=== Geelong ===
1950 Victorian state election: Geelong
Party	Candidate	Votes	%	±%
Labor	James Dunn	11,405	55.9	−2.0
Liberal and Country	Edward Montgomery	9,014	44.1	+2.0
Total formal votes		20,419	99.6	+0.3
Informal votes		90	0.4	−0.3
Turnout		20,509	95.1	+0.7
Labor hold		Swing	−2.0	

=== Gippsland East ===
1950 Victorian state election: Gippsland East
Party	Candidate	Votes	%	±%
Country	Albert Lind	8,421	69.5	−2.0
Liberal and Country	Gordon Savage	3,691	30.5	+30.5
Total formal votes		12,112	98.1	−1.2
Informal votes		237	1.9	+1.2
Turnout		12,349	93.9	+0.3
Country hold		Swing	N/A	

=== Gippsland North ===
1950 Victorian state election: Gippsland North
Party	Candidate	Votes	%	±%
Labor	James Johns	7,179	48.3	+0.5
Country	Bill Fulton	4,658	31.4	−20.8
Liberal and Country	Donald Fowler	3,018	20.3	+20.3
Total formal votes		14,855	99.1	−0.2
Informal votes		141	0.9	+0.2
Turnout		14,996	92.3	−1.9
Two-party-preferred result
Country	Bill Fulton	7,487	50.4	−1.8
Labor	James Johns	7,368	49.6	+1.8
Country hold		Swing	−1.8	

=== Gippsland South ===
1950 Victorian state election: Gippsland South
Party	Candidate	Votes	%	±%
Country	Herbert Hyland	11,544	76.6	+7.4
Liberal and Country	Davy Bertram	3,525	23.4	+23.4
Total formal votes		15,069	97.3	−1.9
Informal votes		410	2.7	+1.9
Turnout		15,479	95.1	0.0
Country hold		Swing	N/A	

=== Gippsland West ===
1950 Victorian state election: Gippsland West
Party	Candidate	Votes	%	±%
Country	Leslie Cochrane	6,137	41.8	−4.7
Liberal and Country	Basil Morris	6,047	41.1	+12.8
Independent	Mac Steward	2,517	17.1	+17.1
Total formal votes		14,701	97.7	−1.5
Informal votes		349	2.3	+1.5
Turnout		15,050	93.9	+0.7
Two-candidate-preferred result
Country	Leslie Cochrane	7,844	53.4	−3.4
Liberal and Country	Basil Morris	6,857	46.6	+3.4
Country hold		Swing	−3.4	

=== Glen Iris ===
1950 Victorian state election: Glen Iris
Party	Candidate	Votes	%	±%
Liberal and Country	Les Norman	16,532	66.5	+5.3
Labor	Gwendolyn Noad	8,333	33.5	+33.5
Total formal votes		24,865	99.3	+0.2
Informal votes		179	0.7	−0.2
Turnout		25,044	94.7	+1.2
Liberal and Country hold		Swing	N/A	

=== Goulburn ===
1950 Victorian state election: Goulburn
Party	Candidate	Votes	%	±%
Labor	Joseph Smith	6,476	49.9	+4.8
Liberal and Country	Philip Grimwade	4,873	37.5	+7.0
Country	William Hoddinott	1,637	12.6	−11.8
Total formal votes		12,986	99.6	+0.4
Informal votes		57	0.4	−0.4
Turnout		13,043	94.7	+0.8
Two-party-preferred result
Labor	Joseph Smith	6,774	52.2	+5.5
Liberal and Country	Philip Grimwade	6,212	47.8	−5.5
Labor gain from Liberal and Country		Swing	+5.5	

=== Grant ===
1950 Victorian state election: Grant
Party	Candidate	Votes	%	±%
Labor	Leslie D'Arcy	6,833	45.5	+5.1
Liberal and Country	Alexander Fraser	4,727	31.5	+4.6
Country	Frederick Holden	3,454	23.0	−9.7
Total formal votes		15,014	99.0	+0.1
Informal votes		149	1.0	−0.1
Turnout		15,163	93.4	−0.5
Two-party-preferred result
Liberal and Country	Alexander Fraser	7,627	50.8	+50.8
Labor	Leslie D'Arcy	7,387	49.2	+7.2
Liberal and Country gain from Country		Swing	N/A	

=== Hampden ===
1950 Victorian state election: Hampden
Party	Candidate	Votes	%	±%
Liberal and Country	Henry Bolte	7,830	57.2	+7.3
Labor	Patrick Denigan	5,856	42.8	+0.9
Total formal votes		13,686	99.1	−0.2
Informal votes		127	0.9	+0.2
Turnout		13,813	95.4	+0.4
Liberal and Country hold		Swing	+0.5	

=== Hawthorn ===
1950 Victorian state election: Hawthorn
Party	Candidate	Votes	%	±%
Labor	Charles Murphy	9,361	41.9	+6.7
Liberal and Country	Les Tyack	8,887	39.8	−12.0
Independent Liberal	Fred Edmunds	4,100	18.3	+18.3
Total formal votes		22,348	99.1	+0.3
Informal votes		203	0.9	−0.3
Turnout		22,551	93.7	+0.5
Two-party-preferred result
Liberal and Country	Les Tyack	12,134	54.3	−6.7
Labor	Charles Murphy	10,214	45.7	+6.7
Liberal and Country hold		Swing	−6.7	

=== Ivanhoe ===
1950 Victorian state election: Ivanhoe
Party	Candidate	Votes	%	±%
Liberal and Country	Rupert Curnow	16,850	58.4	−3.3
Labor	David Walker	11,997	41.6	+41.6
Total formal votes		28,847	99.3	+0.5
Informal votes		209	0.7	−0.5
Turnout		29,056	94.1	+1.0
Liberal and Country hold		Swing	N/A	

=== Kew ===
1950 Victorian state election: Kew
Party	Candidate	Votes	%	±%
Liberal and Country	Arthur Rylah	unopposed		
Liberal and Country hold		Swing		

=== Korong ===
1950 Victorian state election: Korong
Party	Candidate	Votes	%	±%
Liberal and Country	Keith Turnbull	4,428	36.6	+36.6
Labor	Jack McLean	3,957	32.7	+3.8
Country	James Matheson	3,718	30.7	−40.4
Total formal votes		12,103	99.3	−0.1
Informal votes		89	0.7	+0.1
Turnout		12,192	95.4	+0.5
Two-party-preferred result
Liberal and Country	Keith Turnbull	7,313	60.4	+60.4
Labor	Jack McLean	4,790	39.6	+10.7
Liberal and Country gain from Country		Swing	N/A	

=== Malvern ===
1950 Victorian state election: Malvern
Party	Candidate	Votes	%	±%
Liberal and Country	Trevor Oldham	11,949	57.9	−5.1
Labor	Alexander Cahill	6,828	33.1	+33.1
Independent	Mascotte Brown	1,868	9.0	−5.2
Total formal votes		20,645	98.6	+3.3
Informal votes		292	1.4	−3.3
Turnout		20,937	92.7	+2.4
Two-party-preferred result
Liberal and Country	Trevor Oldham	13,439	65.1	−5.0
Labor	Alexander Cahill	7,206	34.9	+34.9
Liberal and Country hold		Swing	N/A	

=== Melbourne ===
1950 Victorian state election: Melbourne
Party	Candidate	Votes	%	±%
Labor	Tom Hayes	14,219	66.0	+6.2
Liberal and Country	John Eddy	7,340	34.0	−6.2
Total formal votes		21,559	98.3	+1.1
Informal votes		368	1.7	−1.1
Turnout		21,927	90.5	+1.8
Labor hold		Swing	+6.2	

=== Mentone ===
1950 Victorian state election: Mentone
Party	Candidate	Votes	%	±%
Labor	George White	15,046	51.4	+4.0
Liberal and Country	Harry Drew	14,231	48.6	−4.0
Total formal votes		29,277	99.3	0.0
Informal votes		218	0.7	0.0
Turnout		29,495	94.5	+0.4
Labor gain from Liberal and Country		Swing	+4.0	

=== Mernda ===
1950 Victorian state election: Mernda
Party	Candidate	Votes	%	±%
Liberal and Country	Arthur Ireland	8,792	60.7	+21.5
Labor	Russell Smith	5,695	39.3	+39.3
Total formal votes		14,487	95.3	−3.3
Informal votes		717	4.7	+3.3
Turnout		15,204	92.7	+0.2
Liberal and Country hold		Swing	N/A	

=== Midlands ===
1950 Victorian state election: Midlands
Party	Candidate	Votes	%	±%
Labor	Clive Stoneham	8,094	56.6	+6.4
Liberal and Country	Harold Boyle	5,054	35.3	+35.3
Country	John Wright	1,156	8.1	−41.7
Total formal votes		14,304	99.2	−0.2
Informal votes		113	0.8	+0.2
Turnout		14,417	96.6	+0.7
Two-party-preferred result
Labor	Clive Stoneham	8,210	57.4	+7.2
Liberal and Country	Harold Boyle	6,094	42.6	+42.6
Labor hold		Swing	+7.2	

=== Mildura ===
1950 Victorian state election: Mildura
Party	Candidate	Votes	%	±%
Labor	Louis Garlick	6,266	47.2	−0.8
Country	Nathaniel Barclay	4,889	36.8	−15.2
Liberal and Country	Kathleen Richardson	2,127	16.0	+16.0
Total formal votes		13,282	98.9	−0.3
Informal votes		147	1.1	+0.3
Turnout		13,429	94.6	+1.0
Two-party-preferred result
Country	Nathaniel Barclay	6,703	50.5	−1.5
Labor	Louis Garlick	6,579	49.5	+1.5
Country hold		Swing	−1.5	

=== Moonee Ponds ===
1950 Victorian state election: Moonee Ponds
Party	Candidate	Votes	%	±%
Labor	Samuel Merrifield	14,073	56.0	+1.2
Liberal and Country	John Rossiter	7,902	31.4	−13.8
Independent	Brian O'Callaghan	3,154	12.6	+12.6
Total formal votes		25,129	99.1	0.0
Informal votes		228	0.9	0.0
Turnout		25,357	95.4	+0.5
Two-party-preferred result
Labor	Samuel Merrifield	14,388	57.2	+2.4
Liberal and Country	John Rossiter	10,741	42.8	−2.4
Labor hold		Swing	+2.4	

=== Mornington ===
1950 Victorian state election: Mornington
Party	Candidate	Votes	%	±%
Liberal and Country	William Leggatt	9,847	59.5	+6.6
Labor	Alexander Higgins	4,566	27.6	−1.3
Independent Country	Albert Allnutt	2,133	12.9	+12.9
Total formal votes		16,546	99.0	0.0
Informal votes		170	1.0	0.0
Turnout		16,716	93.0	+1.5
Two-party-preferred result
Liberal and Country	William Leggatt	11,554	69.8	+0.6
Labor	Alexander Higgins	4,992	30.2	−0.6
Liberal and Country hold		Swing	+0.6	

=== Murray Valley ===
1950 Victorian state election: Murray Valley
Party	Candidate	Votes	%	±%
Country	George Moss	5,697	39.2	−21.8
Labor	Neil Stewart	5,418	37.3	−1.7
Liberal and Country	James Tilson	3,423	23.5	+23.5
Total formal votes		14,538	99.2	0.0
Informal votes		113	0.8	0.0
Turnout		14,651	95.5	+2.5
Two-party-preferred result
Country	George Moss	8,609	59.2	−1.8
Labor	Neil Stewart	5,929	40.8	+1.8
Country hold		Swing	−1.8	

=== Northcote ===
1950 Victorian state election: Northcote
Party	Candidate	Votes	%	±%
Labor	John Cain	17,040	70.0	+6.2
Liberal and Country	Bill Templeton	7,301	30.0	−6.2
Total formal votes		24,341	96.7	+1.2
Informal votes		171	0.7	−1.2
Turnout		24,512	96.7	+1.2
Labor hold		Swing	+6.2	

=== Oakleigh ===
1950 Victorian state election: Oakleigh
Party	Candidate	Votes	%	±%
Labor	Val Doube	11,720	45.7	−3.2
Liberal and Country	Charles Laming	8,833	34.4	−16.7
Independent	John Lechte	5,084	19.8	+19.8
Total formal votes		25,637	99.1	−0.2
Informal votes		230	0.9	+0.2
Turnout		25,867	95.5	+0.6
Two-party-preferred result
Labor	Val Doube	12,820	50.0	+1.1
Liberal and Country	Charles Laming	12,817	50.0	−1.1
Labor gain from Liberal and Country		Swing	+1.1	

=== Polwarth ===
1950 Victorian state election: Polwarth
Party	Candidate	Votes	%	±%
Liberal and Country	Edward Guye	8,094	57.6	−9.3
Labor	Edwin Morris	4,575	32.5	−0.6
Country	John Horne	1,391	9.9	+9.9
Total formal votes		14,060	99.5	+0.1
Informal votes		68	0.5	−0.1
Turnout		14,128	95.9	+0.8
Two-party-preferred result
Liberal and Country	Edward Guye	9,346	66.5	−0.4
Labor	Edwin Morris	4,714	33.5	+0.4
Liberal and Country hold		Swing	−0.4	

=== Portland ===
1950 Victorian state election: Portland
Party	Candidate	Votes	%	±%
Labor	Robert Holt	7,392	51.3	+3.8
Liberal and Country	Harry Hedditch	5,508	38.2	+15.4
Country	Charles Buerckner	1,510	10.5	−19.1
Total formal votes		14,410	99.5	+0.3
Informal votes		71	0.5	−0.3
Turnout		14,481	96.2	+0.4
Two-party-preferred result
Labor	Robert Holt	7,543	52.3	+2.8
Liberal and Country	Harry Hedditch	6,867	47.7	+47.7
Labor gain from Liberal and Country		Swing	+2.8	

=== Port Melbourne ===
1950 Victorian state election: Port Melbourne
Party	Candidate	Votes	%	±%
Labor	Tom Corrigan	18,598	76.2	+7.3
Liberal and Country	Alex Taylor	4,587	18.8	−6.1
Communist	Ralph Gibson	1,239	5.1	−1.1
Total formal votes		24,424	98.0	+0.4
Informal votes		503	2.0	−0.4
Turnout		24,927	93.4	+0.4
Two-party-preferred result
Labor	Tom Corrigan	19,713	80.7	+6.5
Liberal and Country	Alex Taylor	4,711	19.3	−6.5
Labor hold		Swing	+6.5	

=== Prahran ===
1950 Victorian state election: Prahran
Party	Candidate	Votes	%	±%
Labor	Frank Crean	12,879	55.6	+5.4
Liberal and Country	Charles Barrington	10,267	44.4	−5.4
Total formal votes		23,146	99.0	+0.1
Informal votes		223	1.0	−0.1
Turnout		23,369	94.2	+3.4
Labor hold		Swing	+5.4	

=== Preston ===
1950 Victorian state election: Preston
Party	Candidate	Votes	%	±%
Labor	William Ruthven	17,007	64.0	+7.0
Liberal and Country	Vernon Hauser	9,561	36.0	−7.0
Total formal votes		26,568	99.2	−0.1
Informal votes		216	0.8	+0.1
Turnout		26,784	95.9	+0.3
Labor hold		Swing	+7.0	

=== Rainbow ===
1950 Victorian state election: Rainbow
Party	Candidate	Votes	%	±%
Country	Keith Dodgshun	8,403	71.9	−6.0
Liberal and Country	John Meadle	3,288	28.1	+28.1
Total formal votes		11,691	98.9	−0.6
Informal votes		125	1.1	+0.6
Turnout		11,816	95.7	+0.4
Country hold		Swing	N/A	

=== Richmond ===
1950 Victorian state election: Richmond
Party	Candidate	Votes	%	±%
Labor	Frank Scully	17,569	74.5	+1.5
Liberal and Country	Ralph Skinner	4,504	19.1	−7.9
Communist	Ken Miller	1,510	6.4	+6.4
Total formal votes		23,583	97.6	−0.6
Informal votes		567	2.4	+0.6
Turnout		24,150	95.4	+1.3
Two-party-preferred result
Labor	Frank Scully	18,928	80.3	+7.3
Liberal and Country	Ralph Skinner	4,655	19.7	−7.3
Labor hold		Swing	+7.3	

=== Ripon ===
1950 Victorian state election: Ripon
Party	Candidate	Votes	%	±%
Labor	Ernie Morton	6,991	49.0	+2.9
Liberal and Country	Rutherford Guthrie	5,640	39.5	+9.7
Country	Allan Vanstan	1,642	11.5	−12.6
Total formal votes		14,273	99.6	+0.1
Informal votes		50	0.4	−0.1
Turnout		14,323	95.8	−0.5
Two-party-preferred result
Labor	Ernie Morton	7,351	51.5	+3.7
Liberal and Country	Rutherford Guthrie	6,922	48.5	−3.7
Labor gain from Liberal and Country		Swing	+3.7	

=== Rodney ===
1950 Victorian state election: Rodney
Party	Candidate	Votes	%	±%
Country	Richard Brose	7,796	57.3	−13.5
Liberal and Country	Wollaston Heily	5,801	42.7	+13.5
Total formal votes		13,597	98.1	+2.7
Informal votes		263	1.9	−2.7
Turnout		13,860	94.9	−0.4
Country hold		Swing	−13.5	

=== St Kilda ===
1950 Victorian state election: St Kilda
Party	Candidate	Votes	%	±%
Liberal and Country	Archie Michaelis	11,477	52.3	+52.3
Labor	John Bourke	10,464	47.7	+5.8
Total formal votes		21,941	99.1	+0.3
Informal votes		192	0.9	−0.3
Turnout		22,133	93.3	+2.1
Liberal and Country gain from Independent		Swing	N/A	

=== Scoresby ===
1950 Victorian state election: Scoresby
Party	Candidate	Votes	%	±%
Liberal and Country	George Knox	12,036	74.5	−25.5
Independent	Esca Chambers	4,126	25.5	+25.5
Total formal votes		16,162	98.2	
Informal votes		297	1.8	
Turnout		16,459	93.1	
Liberal and Country hold		Swing	N/A	

=== Shepparton ===
1950 Victorian state election: Shepparton
Party	Candidate	Votes	%	±%
Country	John McDonald	6,395	41.6	−26.9
Labor	Gordon Anderson	5,263	34.3	+2.8
Liberal and Country	Harold Causer	3,698	24.1	+24.1
Total formal votes		15,356	99.1	+0.1
Informal votes		133	0.9	−0.1
Turnout		15,489	94.9	+0.8
Two-party-preferred result
Country	John McDonald	9,439	61.5	−7.0
Labor	Gordon Anderson	5,917	39.5	+7.0
Country hold		Swing	−7.0	

=== Sunshine ===
1950 Victorian state election: Sunshine
Party	Candidate	Votes	%	±%
Labor	Ernie Shepherd	20,369	77.8	+8.8
Liberal and Country	Marguerite James	5,823	22.2	−8.8
Total formal votes		26,192	99.0	0.0
Informal votes		258	1.0	0.0
Turnout		26,450	95.1	+0.8
Labor hold		Swing	+8.8	

=== Swan Hill ===
1950 Victorian state election: Swan Hill
Party	Candidate	Votes	%	±%
Liberal and Country	John Hipworth	6,792	51.7	+51.7
Country	Samuel Lockhart	6,339	48.3	−16.6
Total formal votes		13,131	99.1	−0.2
Informal votes		124	0.9	+0.2
Turnout		13,255	94.4	0.0
Liberal and Country gain from Country		Swing	N/A	

=== Toorak ===
1950 Victorian state election: Toorak
Party	Candidate	Votes	%	±%
Liberal and Country	Edward Reynolds	12,509	57.7	−1.3
Labor	Henry Peagram	9,178	42.3	+42.3
Total formal votes		21,687	99.2	+2.1
Informal votes		176	0.8	−2.1
Turnout		21,863	95.5	+7.6
Liberal and Country hold		Swing	N/A	

=== Warrnambool ===
1950 Victorian state election: Warrnambool
Party	Candidate	Votes	%	±%
Labor	James Farrell	5,804	41.8	+1.2
Liberal and Country	Ronald Mack	4,745	34.1	+34.1
Country	Henry Bailey	3,349	24.1	−35.3
Total formal votes		13,898	99.4	0.0
Informal votes		89	0.6	0.0
Turnout		13,987	96.4	+0.4
Two-party-preferred result
Liberal and Country	Ronald Mack	7,102	51.1	+51.1
Labor	James Farrell	6,796	48.9	+8.3
Liberal and Country gain from Country		Swing	N/A	

=== Williamstown ===
1950 Victorian state election: Williamstown
Party	Candidate	Votes	%	±%
Labor	John Lemmon	16,560	65.2	+1.8
Liberal and Country	Bruce Edwards	6,571	25.9	−0.8
Communist	Alex Dobbin	2,264	8.9	+8.9
Total formal votes		25,395	98.8	−0.2
Informal votes		308	1.2	+0.2
Turnout		25,703	95.3	+0.3
Two-party-preferred result
Labor	John Lemmon	18,598	73.2	+1.9
Liberal and Country	Bruce Edwards	6,797	26.8	−1.9
Labor hold		Swing	+1.9	

=== Wonthaggi ===
1950 Victorian state election: Wonthaggi
Party	Candidate	Votes	%	±%
Country	William Buckingham	6,016	41.0	−16.0
Labor	Percy Vagg	5,161	35.2	−7.8
Liberal and Country	Robert McIndoe	3,499	23.8	+23.8
Total formal votes		14,676	99.5	−0.1
Informal votes		79	0.5	+0.1
Turnout		14,755	95.5	+0.2
Two-party-preferred result
Country	William Buckingham	9,256	63.1	+6.1
Labor	Percy Vagg	5,470	36.9	−6.1
Country hold		Swing	+6.1	

== See also ==
- 1950 Victorian state election
- Members of the Victorian Legislative Assembly, 1950–1952
