= Candidates of the 1950 Victorian state election =

The 1950 Victorian state election was held on 13 May 1950.

== Retiring Members ==
Sir Albert Dunstan (Country, Korong) died before the election; no by-election was held.

=== Liberal and Country ===
- William Everard MLA (Evelyn)

=== Country ===
- Matthew Bennett MLA (Gippsland West)

== Legislative Assembly ==
Sitting members are shown in bold text. Successful candidates are highlighted in the relevant colour. Where there is possible confusion, an asterisk (*) is also used.

Electorate	Held by	Labor candidates	LCP candidates	Country candidates	Other candidates
Albert Park	LCP	Keith Sutton	**Roy Schilling**		
Allandale	Country	Stanley Glover	Thomas Grigg	**Russell White**	
Ballarat	LCP	John Sheehan	**Thomas Hollway**		Albert Nicholls (Ind)
Barwon	LCP		**Sir Thomas Maltby**		
Benalla	Country		Jack Pennington	**Frederick Cook**	
Benambra	Country		James Ronan	**Tom Mitchell**	
Bendigo	Labor	**Bill Galvin**	Harold Every		
Borung	Country		**Wilfred Mibus**	Rupert Levitzke	
Box Hill	LCP	Bob Gray	**George Reid**		
Brighton	LCP		**Ray Tovell**		
Brunswick	Labor	**Peter Randles**	Bruce Cann		
Camberwell	LCP	John Stewart	**Robert Whately**		
Carlton	Labor	**Bill Barry**	Frank Block		
Caulfield	LCP	Daniel Elliston	**Alexander Dennett**		
Clifton Hill	Labor	**Joseph O'Carroll**	Kenneth Withers		
Coburg	Independent	Kevin Hayes	John Morris		**Charlie Mutton** (Ind)
Collingwood	Labor	**Bill Towers**	Richard Taylor		
Dandenong	LCP	Les Coates	**William Dawnay-Mould**		
Dundas	LCP	Joseph Toleman	**William McDonald**	Gilbert Kirsopp	
Elsternwick	LCP	Harold Lorback	**John Don**		
Essendon	LCP	George Fewster	**Allen Bateman**		Arthur Dodds (Ind)
Evelyn	LCP	John Dunbar	Roland Leckie		Clifford Wolfe (Ind)
Footscray	Labor	**Jack Holland**	Leonard Gordon		John Arrowsmith (CPA)
Geelong	LCP	James Dunn	**Edward Montgomery**		
Gippsland East	Country		Gordon Savage	**Albert Lind**	
Gippsland North	Country	James Johns	Donald Fowler	**Bill Fulton**	
Gippsland South	Country		Davy Bertram	**Herbert Hyland**	
Gippsland West	Country		Basil Morris	Leslie Cochrane	Mac Steward (Ind)
Glen Iris	LCP	Gwendolyn Noad	**Les Norman**		
Goulburn	LCP	Joseph Smith	**Philip Grimwade**	William Hoddinott	
Grant	Country	Leslie D'Arcy	Alexander Fraser	**Frederick Holden**	
Hampden	LCP	Patrick Denigan	**Henry Bolte**		
Hawthorn	LCP	Charles Murphy	Les Tyack		**Fred Edmunds** (Ind)
Ivanhoe	LCP	David Walker	**Rupert Curnow**		
Kew	LCP		**Arthur Rylah**		
Korong	Country	Jack McLean	Keith Turnbull	James Matheson	
Malvern	LCP	Alexander Cahill	**Trevor Oldham**		Mascotte Brown (Ind)
Melbourne	Labor	**Tom Hayes**	John Eddy		
Mentone	LCP	George White	**Harry Drew**		
Mernda	LCP	Russell Smith	**Arthur Ireland**		
Midlands	Labor	**Clive Stoneham**	Harold Boyle	John Wright	
Mildura	Country	Louis Garlick	Kathleen Richardson	**Nathaniel Barclay**	
Moonee Ponds	Labor	**Samuel Merrifield**	John Rossiter		Brian O'Callaghan (Ind)
Mornington	LCP	Alexander Higgins	**William Leggatt**		Albert Allnutt (Ind CP)
Murray Valley	Country	Neil Stewart	James Tilson	**George Moss**	
Northcote	Labor	**John Cain**	Bill Templeton		
Oakleigh	LCP	Val Doube	Charles Laming		**John Lechte** (Ind)
Polwarth	Country	Edwin Morris	**Edward Guye**	John Horne	
Portland	Country	Robert Holt	**Harry Hedditch**	Charles Buerckner	
Port Melbourne	Labor	**Tom Corrigan**	Alex Taylor		Ralph Gibson (CPA)
Prahran	Labor	**Frank Crean**	Charles Barrington		
Preston	Labor	**William Ruthven**	Vernon Hauser		
Rainbow	Country		John Meadle	**Keith Dodgshun**	
Richmond	Labor	**Frank Scully**	Ralph Skinner		Ken Miller (CPA)
Ripon	LCP	Ernie Morton	**Rutherford Guthrie**	Allan Vanstan	
Rodney	Country		Wollaston Heily	**Richard Brose**	
St Kilda	Independent	John Bourke	**Archie Michaelis**		
Scoresby	LCP		**Sir George Knox**		Esca Chambers (Ind)
Shepparton	Country	Gordon Anderson	Harold Causer	**John McDonald**	
Sunshine	Labor	**Ernie Shepherd**	Marguerite James		
Swan Hill	Country		**John Hipworth**	Samuel Lockhart	
Toorak	LCP	Henry Peagram	**Edward Reynolds**		
Warrnambool	Country	James Farrell	Ronald Mack	**Henry Bailey**	
Williamstown	Labor	**John Lemmon**	Bruce Edwards		Alex Dobbin (CPA)
Wonthaggi	Country	Percy Vagg	Robert McIndoe	**William Buckingham**	

== See also ==
- 1949 Victorian Legislative Council election
