= Electoral results for the district of Goulburn (Victoria) =

Victoria, Australia, district election results

This is a list of electoral results for the electoral district of Goulburn in Victorian state elections.

== Members for Goulburn ==
Member	Party	Term
Joseph Smith	Labor	1945–1947
Philip Grimwade	Liberal	1947–1950
Joseph Smith	Labor	1950–1955

== Election results ==
=== Elections in the 1950s ===
1952 Victorian state election: Goulburn
Party	Candidate	Votes	%	±%
Labor	Joseph Smith	8,478	62.5	+12.6
Liberal and Country	John Roberts	5,087	37.5	0.0
Total formal votes		13,565	99.0	−0.6
Informal votes		133	1.0	+0.6
Turnout		13,698	93.6	−1.1
Labor hold		Swing	+10.3	

1950 Victorian state election: Goulburn
Party	Candidate	Votes	%	±%
Labor	Joseph Smith	6,476	49.9	+4.8
Liberal and Country	Philip Grimwade	4,873	37.5	+7.0
Country	William Hoddinott	1,637	12.6	−11.8
Total formal votes		12,986	99.6	+0.4
Informal votes		57	0.4	−0.4
Turnout		13,043	94.7	+0.8
Two-party-preferred result
Labor	Joseph Smith	6,774	52.2	+5.5
Liberal and Country	Philip Grimwade	6,212	47.8	−5.5
Labor gain from Liberal and Country		Swing	+5.5	

=== Elections in the 1940s ===
1947 Victorian state election: Goulburn
Party	Candidate	Votes	%	±%
Labor	Joseph Smith	5,632	45.1	−0.4
Liberal	Philip Grimwade	3,811	30.5	+8.8
Country	Cyril Davy	3,045	24.4	+8.4
Total formal votes		12,488	99.2	+0.3
Informal votes		101	0.8	−0.3
Turnout		12,589	93.9	+6.7
Two-party-preferred result
Liberal	Philip Grimwade	6,655	53.3	+5.2
Labor	Joseph Smith	5,833	46.7	−5.2
Liberal gain from Labor		Swing	+5.2	

1945 Victorian state election: Goulburn
Party	Candidate	Votes	%	±%
Labor	Joseph Smith	4,970	45.5	
Liberal	Philip Grimwade	2,374	21.7	
Independent Country	Edwin Mackrell	1,822	16.7	
Country	Cyril Davy	1,748	16.0	
Total formal votes		10,914	98.9	
Informal votes		118	1.1	
Turnout		11,032	87.2	
Two-party-preferred result
Labor	Joseph Smith	5,664	51.9	
Liberal	Phillip Grimwade	5,250	48.1	
Labor gain from Country		Swing		
