= Electoral results for the district of Ballarat =

Victoria, Australia, district election results

This is a list of electoral results for the electoral district of Ballarat in Victorian state elections.

== Members for Ballarat ==
Member	Party	Term
William McAdam	Labor	1927-1932
Thomas Hollway	United Australia	1932-1945
Thomas Hollway	Liberal / LCP	1945-1952
Thomas Hollway	Independent	1952
Thomas Hollway	Electoral Reform	1952
John Sheehan	Labor	1952-1955

== Election results ==
=== Elections in the 1950s ===
1952 Victorian state election: Ballarat
Party	Candidate	Votes	%	±%
Labor	John Sheehan	11,042	54.0	+7.2
Liberal and Country	William Roff	9,424	46.0	−7.2
Total formal votes		20,466	99.0	−0.2
Informal votes		211	1.0	+0.2
Turnout		20,677	96.2	−0.6
Labor gain from Liberal and Country		Swing	+7.2	

1950 Victorian state election: Ballarat
Party	Candidate	Votes	%	±%
Liberal and Country	Thomas Hollway	10,646	51.2	−3.0
Labor	John Sheehan	9,735	46.8	+1.0
Independent	Albert Nicholls	421	2.0	+2.0
Total formal votes		20,802	99.2	0.0
Informal votes		163	0.8	0.0
Two-party-preferred result
Liberal and Country	Thomas Hollway	11,025	53.0	−1.2
Labor	John Sheehan	9,777	47.0	+1.2
Liberal and Country hold		Swing	−1.2	

=== Elections in the 1940s ===
1947 Victorian state election: Ballarat
Party	Candidate	Votes	%	±%
Liberal	Thomas Hollway	11,267	54.2	+1.6
Labor	James Miller	9,516	45.8	+4.0
Total formal votes		20,783	99.2	+0.7
Informal votes		157	0.8	−0.7
Turnout		20,940	95.5	+3.9
Liberal hold		Swing	N/A	

1945 Victorian state election: Ballarat
Party	Candidate	Votes	%	±%
Liberal	Thomas Hollway	9,884	52.6	
Labor	Stanley Glover	7,850	41.8	
Communist	Albert Black	1,036	5.5	
Total formal votes		18,770	98.5	
Informal votes		281	1.5	
Turnout		19,051	91.6	
Liberal hold		Swing		

- Preferences were not distributed.

1943 Victorian state election: Ballarat
Party	Candidate	Votes	%	±%
United Australia	Thomas Hollway	9,733	59.9	−5.6
Labor	Maurice Calnin	4,551	28.0	−6.5
Communist	Edward Rowe	1,967	12.1	+12.1
Total formal votes		16,251	98.8	−0.6
Informal votes		195	1.2	+0.6
Turnout		16,446	89.7	−4.6
United Australia hold		Swing	N/A	

- Preferences were not distributed.

1940 Victorian state election: Ballarat
Party	Candidate	Votes	%	±%
United Australia	Thomas Hollway	10,902	65.5	−1.0
Labor	Thomas Jude	5,728	34.5	+1.0
Total formal votes		16,630	99.4	+0.2
Informal votes		107	0.6	−0.2
Turnout		16,737	94.3	−1.0
United Australia hold		Swing	−1.0	

=== Elections in the 1930s ===
1937 Victorian state election: Ballarat
Party	Candidate	Votes	%	±%
United Australia	Thomas Hollway	11,363	66.5	+10.9
Labor	Arthur Loft	5,722	33.5	−10.9
Total formal votes		17,085	99.2	−0.1
Informal votes		142	0.8	+0.1
Turnout		17,227	95.3	+0.1
United Australia hold		Swing	+10.9	

1935 Victorian state election: Ballarat
Party	Candidate	Votes	%	±%
United Australia	Thomas Hollway	9,856	55.6	−1.1
Labor	William McAdam	7,646	44.4	+1.1
Total formal votes		17,232	99.3	+0.2
Informal votes		122	0.7	−0.2
Turnout		17,354	95.2	−0.9
United Australia hold		Swing	−1.1	

1932 Victorian state election: Ballarat
Party	Candidate	Votes	%	±%
United Australia	Thomas Hollway	9,654	56.7	+11.6
Labor	William McAdam	7,371	43.3	−11.6
Total formal votes		17,025	99.1	+0.1
Informal votes		162	0.9	−0.1
Turnout		17,187	96.1	+4.5
United Australia gain from Labor		Swing	+11.6	

=== Elections in the 1920s ===
1929 Victorian state election: Ballarat
Party	Candidate	Votes	%	±%
Labor	William McAdam	8,992	54.9	+1.3
Nationalist	Fred Edmunds	7,397	45.1	−1.3
Total formal votes		16,389	99.1	+0.1
Informal votes		148	0.9	−0.1
Turnout		16,537	96.9	+2.0
Labor hold		Swing	+1.3	

1927 Victorian state election: Ballarat
Party	Candidate	Votes	%	±%
Labor	William McAdam	8,313	53.6	
Nationalist	Matthew Baird	7,203	46.4	
Total formal votes		15,516	99.0	
Informal votes		162	1.0	
Turnout		15,678	94.9	
Labor hold		Swing		
