= Brownbill =

Brownbill is a surname. Notable people with the surname include:

- Derek Brownbill (born 1954), English footballer
- Fanny Brownbill (1890–1948), Australian politician
- Kay Brownbill (1914–2002), Australian politician
- William Brownbill (1864–1938), Australian politician
