= 1950 Victorian state election =

Australian state election

← 1947	13 May 1950	1952 →

All 65 seats in the Victorian Legislative Assembly 33 seats needed for a majority
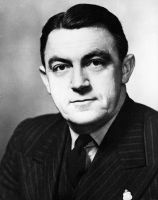

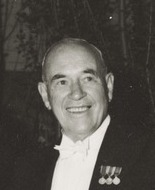

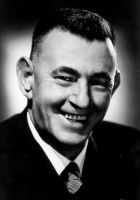
	First party	Second party	Third party
Leader	Thomas Hollway	John Cain	John McDonald
Party	Liberal and Country	Labor	Country
Leader since	3 December 1940	18 October 1937	22 November 1945
Leader's seat	Ballarat	Northcote	Shepparton
Last election	27 seats	17 seats	20 seats
Seats before	30 seats	16 seats	16 seats
Seats won	27 seats	24 seats	13 seats
Seat change	▼3	▲8	▼3
Percentage	40.69%	45.29%	10.64%
Swing	▲3.53	▲4.42	▼4.28
- Results in each electorate
Premier before election
Thomas Hollway
Liberal and Country
Elected Premier
Thomas Hollway
Liberal and Country

The 1950 Victorian state election was held in the Australian state of Victoria on Saturday 13 May 1950 to elect 65 members of the state's Legislative Assembly.

== Background ==
The previous state election in May 1947 had resulted in the Liberal–Country coalition led by Thomas Hollway winning by a substantial majority. In late 1948, Country leader and Deputy Premier John McDonald criticised Hollway over his "lack of strength" in dealing with a long-running transport strike, and his conciliatory negotiations with the transport unions. Hollway responded by sacking McDonald as his deputy and dissolving the coalition. The Country Party became the official opposition (with three seats more than Labor in the assembly). Hollway formed a minority Liberal government, convincing four Country Party assembly members (Guye, Hedditch, Hipworth and Mibus) to defect to his party, which he provocatively renamed the Liberal and Country Party.

Despite lacking a majority, Hollway's government survived for nearly a year due to the support of two Country members (Bennett and Hyland) and the casting vote of the Speaker, Sir Thomas Maltby, in vital divisions. In February 1950, the LCP voted to expel two members of the parliamentary party—Fred Edmunds and John Lechte—for disloyalty, reducing the government's members to 30. On 12 April, the Governor of Victoria, Sir Dallas Brooks, summoned McDonald and Labor leader John Cain to gain their assurance that they would not form a joint ministry. Hollway was then summoned, and agreeing that the house had become unworkable and that there was no chance of the LCP and Country Party reconciling, was granted a dissolution of the assembly.

Labor had lost the seat of Geelong to the Liberals in a 1948 by-election following the death of Fanny Brownbill.

Former Premier and member for Korong, Sir Albert Dunstan, died suddenly on 14 April, the day after the dissolution of the Legislative Assembly and the issue of the election writs. Due to the proximity of the general election, no by-election was held for his seat.

== Results ==
=== Legislative Assembly ===
Victorian state election, 13 May 1950 Legislative Assembly << 1947–1952 >>
Enrolled voters	1,294,159				
Votes cast	1,221,734		Turnout	94.40	+0.96
Informal votes	13,901		Informal	1.14	−0.19
Summary of votes by party
Party	Primary votes	%	Swing	Seats	Change
Labor	546,978	45.29	+4.42	24	+8
Liberal and Country	491,448	40.69	+3.53	27	−3
Country	128,537	10.64	−4.28	13	−3
Communist	6,308	0.52	+0.39	0	±0
Independent	34,562	2.86	−4.06	1	±0
Total	1,207,833			65	

== Aftermath ==
With the coalition between the Country Party and the Liberal and Country Party dissolved in the previous term, Hollway's LCP government's loss of six seats put it in a precarious situation—even further into minority although still holding more seats than each of Labor and the Country Party—so Hollway was expected to hold onto government.

Negotiations between the CP and LCP continued into June, with the LCP proposing to offer Country leader John McDonald the role of Speaker, and cabinet positions to Country Party MPs in a "composite" government. On 16 June, Hollway announced his new cabinet, with new ministers Les Norman and John Don being sworn in by the governor on 19 June to replace ministers who had resigned or lost their seats, although by this point it was clear that Hollway's government would be defeated on the floor of the Legislative Assembly in a no-confidence motion, which was all but confirmed when the state Labor caucus decided to support the Country Party over Hollway's government.

On 22 June, McDonald gave notice of his intention to raise a motion of no-confidence against Hollway's government, which he did. Debate continued for 17 hours until 4am on 23 June, when the Labor and Country parties combined to carry the no-confidence motion. Hollway resigned his commission as premier, after the governor, Sir Dallas Brooks, refused his request to dissolve the assembly and call a fresh election. Brooks then commissioned McDonald to form a government with only 13 seats in the assembly, but with the promise of support from the Labor Party on confidence and supply.

As of 2024, this was the last Victorian state election that the Country Party/National party received over 10% of the vote.

== See also ==
- Candidates of the 1950 Victorian state election
- 1949 Victorian Legislative Council election
