= 1948 Geelong state by-election =

A by-election for the seat of Geelong in the Victorian Legislative Assembly was held on Saturday 13 November 1948. The by-election was triggered by the death of Labor member Fanny Brownbill on 10 October 1948.

The candidates were M. J. Travers for the Labor Party (a metalworker employed by the Ford Motors Geelong plant, and former president of the Geelong Trades and Labour Council), S. Baker for the Communist Party, and Edward Montgomery for the Liberal Party.

The Liberal Party won the seat, with Montgomery receiving about 45 per cent of preferences from the Communist candidate, and a nearly ten per cent swing away from Labor. This attracted comment from acting state Labor leader Bill Galvin, who said "there was a sinister influence in the way the Liberals and the Communists had put up a united front" in the by-election; and from Labor Prime Minister Ben Chifley, who also noted the role of Communist preferences in Labor's loss. Acting Liberal leader Wilfrid Kent Hughes called the win "a magnificent victory for the Liberal Party and the present Government".

== Results ==
Geelong state by-election, 1948
Party	Candidate	Votes	%	±%
Liberal	Edward Montgomery	9,659	49.58	+10.28
Labor	M. J. Travers	8,777	45.05	−10.28
Communist	S. Baker	1,045	5.36	+5.36
Total formal votes		19,481	97.36	
Informal votes		528	2.64	
Turnout		20,009		
Two-party-preferred result
Liberal	Edward Montgomery	10,147	52.09	+9.97
Labor	M. J. Travers	9,334	47.91	−9.97
Liberal gain from Labor		Swing		
