= George Board (politician) =

Australian politician

George Board (26 December 1817 – 1872) was a politician in colonial Australia, a member of the Victorian Legislative Assembly.

Board was born in Chew Magna, Somerset, England. He arrived in Geelong c. 1852 and was a merchant alone in Little Malop Street; for a time in business as Board & Co., wool firm, then Board & Son with London agents and branch in Brisbane; director Geelong branch Bank of NSW 1853–1859; purchased land N. Geelong 1854; trustee new general cemetery Geelong 1858; resided Geelong till 1863; believed to have moved to Queensland.

Board was elected as a member for Geelong in the Victorian Legislative Assembly being sworn in on 1 February 1858.

Victorian Legislative Assembly
Preceded by Alexander Fyfe	Member for Geelong; 1 February 1858 – 1 August 1859; With: James Harrison; John Brooke; Alexander Thomson	Seat abolished
