= Robert Purnell =

Australian politician

Robert Purnell (30 March 1855 – 1 June 1937) was an Australian politician.

He was born in Chilwell to builder William Purnell and Margaret Lamb. Educated in Geelong, he became a bookkeeper before eventually founding a shipping agency in 1896, which also dealt with coal imports and general carrying. He had married Helen Hitchins in 1887; they had six children. Purnell served on Geelong City Council from 1915 to 1931 and was mayor from 1923 to 1924. He was elected to the Victorian Legislative Assembly in 1917 as the Nationalist member for Geelong, but was defeated in 1920. Purnell died in Newtown in 1937.

Victorian Legislative Assembly
Preceded by William Plain	Member for Geelong; 1917–1920	Succeeded by William Brownbill
