= Hayden Shell =

Australian politician

Hayden Kevin Shell (23 March 1937 – 1 November 2015) was an Australian politician.

Shell was born in Geelong to Alick Humphrey Shell, a painter, and Florrie Coone. He attended local state schools and became a postmaster. From 1970 to 1974 he was state secretary of the Postal Clerks Union; he also joined the Labor Party in 1971. He was a councillor on Geelong West City Council from 1976 to 1982.

In 1982 Shell was elected to the Victorian Legislative Assembly as the member for Geelong West, moving to Geelong in 1985. He lost his seat in 1992, but served on Greater Geelong City Council from 1995 to 1998.

Victorian Legislative Assembly
Preceded by Hayden Birrell	Member for Geelong West; 1982–1985	Abolished
New seat	Member for Geelong; 1985–1992	Succeeded by Ann Henderson
