= Edward Austin (politician) =

Australian politician

Edward Arthur Austin (3 July 1875 – 1 May 1940) was an Australian politician.

He was born in Avalon to Sidney Austin and Harriet May Austin, whose brothers Austin Austin and Edwin Austin were also politicians. He went on to attend Geelong Grammar School and became a secretary to a wool buying firm. From 1916 to 1933 he worked as a secretary and bursar at Geelong Grammar School. He was elected to the Victorian Legislative Assembly as the United Australia Party member for Geelong in 1932, but was defeated in 1935. Austin died in Geelong in 1940.

Victorian Legislative Assembly
Preceded by William Brownbill	Member for Geelong; 1932–1935	Succeeded by William Brownbill
