= Charles Leonard Andrews =

Australian politician

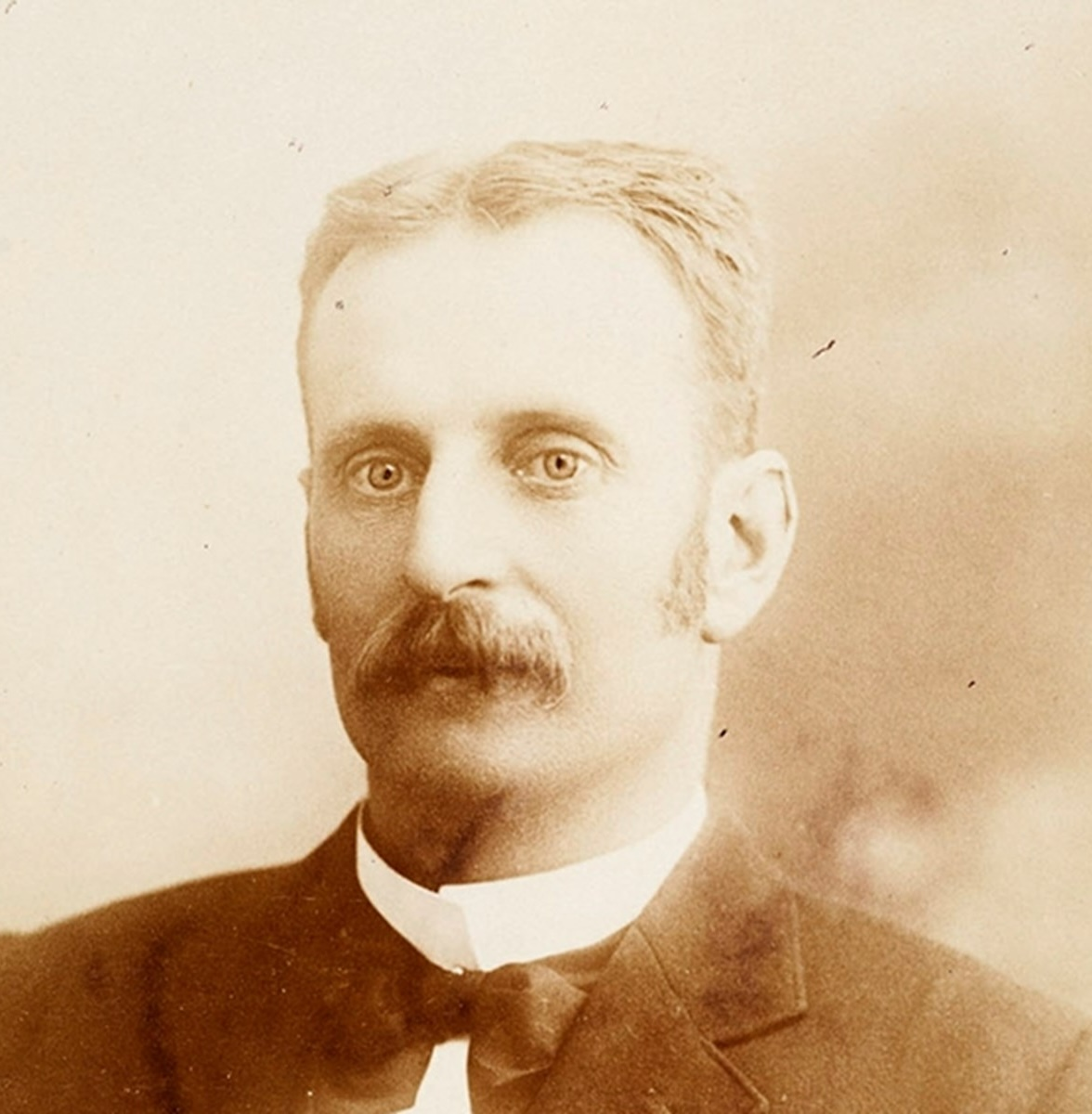

Member of the Victorian Legislative Assembly for Electoral district of Geelong
- In office November 1900 – May 1904 Serving with George Martin and William Gurr
- Preceded by: H. B. Higgins
- Succeeded by: William Colechin

Personal details
- Born: 2 March 1861 Newtown, Victoria
- Died: 6 October 1914 (aged 53) Richmond, Victoria
- Party: Liberal Party
- Parent: Charles Andrews (father)

Charles Leonard Andrews (2 March 1861 – 6 October 1914) was an Australian politician in the Victorian Legislative Assembly. Andrews served as the member for Geelong between 1900 and 1904.

== Bibliography ==
- Andrews, Charles Leonard (1911). Poems. Melbourne: Harston, Partridge & Co. ISBN 1372048588.
