= Charles Andrews (Victorian politician) =

Australian politician

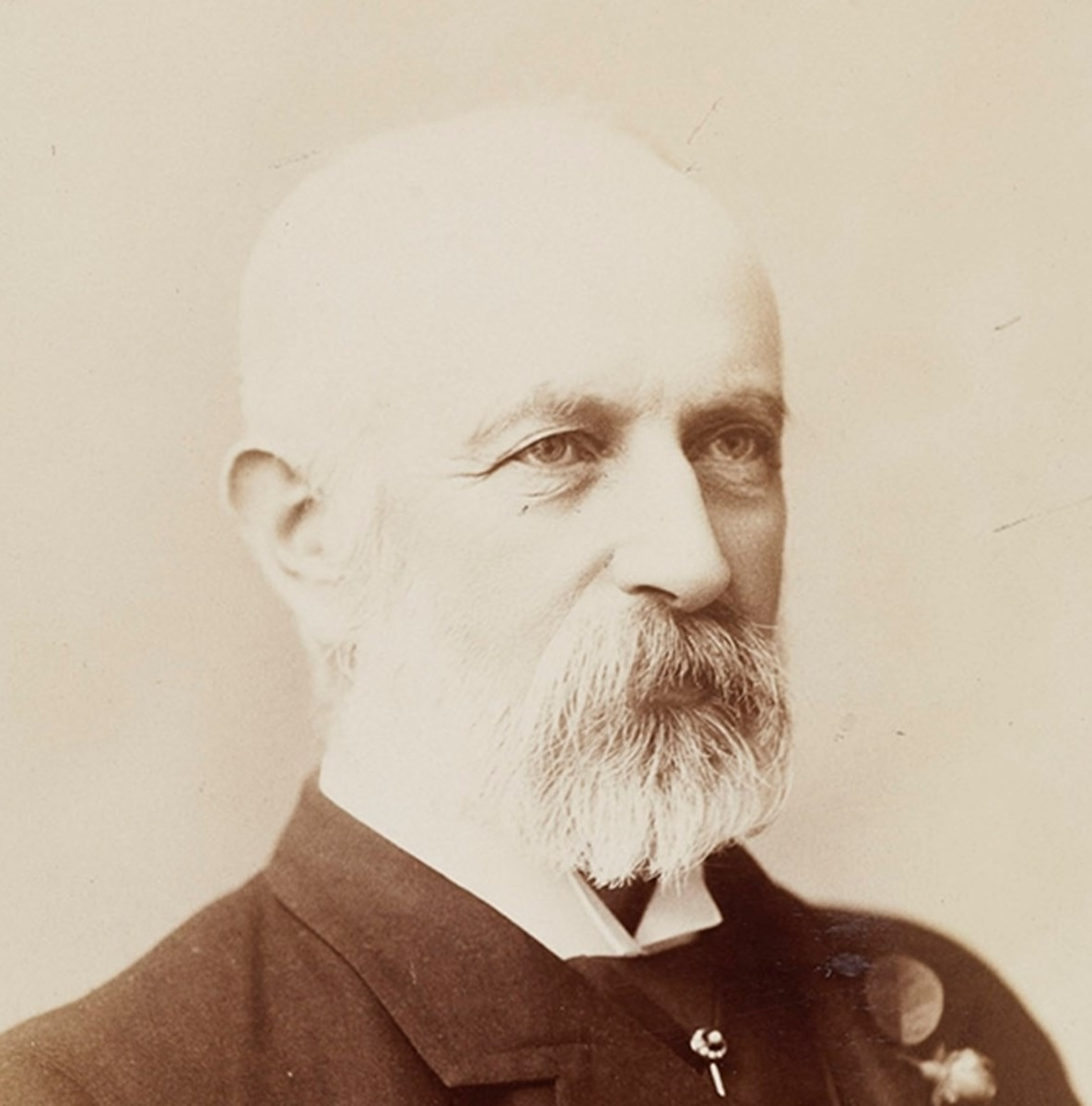

Member of the Victorian Legislative Assembly for Electoral district of Geelong
- In office May 1880 – June 1880
- In office March 1886 – September 1894

Personal details
- Born: 25 December 1834 Newmarket, Suffolk, England
- Died: 2 July 1895 (aged 60) Hawthorn, Victoria
- Children: Charles Leonard Andrews
- Profession: Draper and accountant

Charles Andrews (25 December 1834 – 2 July 1895) was an Australian politician in the Victorian Legislative Assembly. Andrews served as the member for Geelong twice; first in 1880, and then between 1886 and 1894.

== Early life are career ==
Andrews arrived in Melbourne in March 1853 and settled in Geelong where he worked at his father's retail draper. In around 1858, he started his own wholesale business and later founded and chaired the company, Barwon (Excelsior) Woollen Mills. He served as mayor of Newtown and Chilwell Council between 1872 and 1874. He also served as a councillor at Gordon Technical College, and chairman of Geelong Gas Company.

Andrews was first sworn in to parliament in May 1880 when he successfully contested the electoral district of Geelong in the February 1880 Victorian colonial election. Despite receiving only the second highest number of votes (behind Graham Berry), he was elected MP as Geelong was a three-member seat at the time. Andrews suffered electoral defeat in July of the same year in the July 1880 Victorian colonial election.

After his electoral defeat, Andrews established a softgoods business on Flinders Lane 1882 and later an accounting practice in Hawthorn, Victoria.

Andrews was re-elected as an MP for Geelong and served between March 1886 and September 1894, associating with the Anti-Berry, protectionist, and coalitionist blocs. He served as government whip in 1892.

== Personal life ==
Andrews was the son of Henry and Susan Andrews and married Miss Board to which they had one son and four daughters.

He died at his residence on Lisson Grove, Hawthorn on 2 July 1895, aged 60.
