= Ian Trezise =

Australian politician

Member of the Victorian Legislative Assembly for Geelong
- In office 18 September 1999 – 29 November 2014
- Preceded by: Ann Henderson
- Succeeded by: Christine Couzens

Personal details
- Born: Ian Douglas Trezise; 30 September 1959 (age 67) Geelong, Victoria, Australia
- Party: Labor Party
- Relations: Neil Trezise (father)
- Occupation: Shipping manager
- Committees: Road Safety Committee

Ian Douglas Trezise (born 30 September 1959) is an Australian politician. He was a Labor Party member of the Victorian Legislative Assembly from 1999 to 2014, representing the seat of Geelong.

== Background ==
Trezise was born and raised in Geelong, the son of high-profile Labor minister and AFL footballer Neil Trezise, and is of Cornish descent. He was educated at Newcomb Primary and Geelong High School before completing a postgraduate diploma in personnel management. Ian worked for the Australian Workers' Union for a number of years, before becoming shipping manager at the Port of Geelong. He was a Geelong City Councillor from 1989 to 1993. He is married with two children.

== Parliamentary career ==
Trezise was first elected in 1999, when he won the seat of Geelong by a very narrow 16 votes, as part of the dramatic 1999 Victorian state election. In the 2002 election he substantially increased his majority with an 8.5% swing, and he maintained that vote in the 2006 state election. In the 2010 election his margin was slashed to 2.1%.

He served on the parliamentary Road Safety Committee from 1999 until November 2010, and was chairman from 2003 to 2006.

Trezise resigned as the Member for Geelong at the 2014 Victorian state election. He was succeeded by Christine Couzens, a member of his staff since he was elected in 1999.

Victorian Legislative Assembly
Preceded by Ann Henderson	Member for Geelong; 1999–2014	Succeeded by Christine Couzens
