= Thomas Maltby =

Australian politician

Sir Thomas Maltby
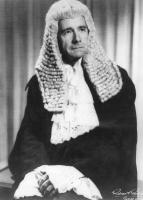

21st Speaker of the Victorian Legislative Assembly
- In office 2 December 1947 – 12 April 1950
- Preceded by: Sir George Knox
- Succeeded by: Archie Michaelis

10th Deputy Premier of Victoria
- In office 2 October 1945 – 21 November 1945
- Premier: Albert Dunstan
- Preceded by: Thomas Hollway
- Succeeded by: Frank Field

Member of the Victorian Legislative Assembly for Barwon
- In office 6 July 1929 – 22 April 1955
- Preceded by: Edward Morley
- Succeeded by: District abolished

Member of the Victorian Legislative Assembly for Geelong
- In office 28 May 1955 – 1 June 1961
- Preceded by: James Dunn
- Succeeded by: Hayden Birrell

Personal details
- Born: Thomas Karran Maltby; 17 October 1890 Barnadown, Victoria
- Died: 2 June 1976 (aged 85) Geelong, Victoria, Australia
- Party: Liberal and Country Party
- Other political affiliations: Nationalist Party; United Australia Party; Liberal Party; Independent
- Spouse: Eliza Margaret McDonald (m. 1913)
- Awards: Mentioned in Despatches (1918)

Military service
- Allegiance: Australia
- Branch/service: Australian Army
- Years of service: 1915–1919, 1940–1943
- Rank: Major
- Unit: 5th Battalion

Major Sir Thomas Karran Maltby (17 October 1890 – 2 June 1976) was a politician in Victoria, Australia. He was a member of the Victorian Legislative Assembly for nearly 32 years from 1929 to 1961, served in several ministries and was Speaker of the assembly from 1947 to 1950.

== Early life ==
Matlby was born in Barnadown, a small town near Bendigo, Victoria, to Thomas Karran Maltby (a shopkeeper from the Isle of Man) and Ada Agnes Fascher. His father died in 1893, and his mother remarried the following year. Maltby was educated at Camp Hill Central School, but left school aged 11 to work as a newsboy and shop messenger. He attended the Bendigo School of Mines at night, studying to receive an engineer's certificate, while working as a battery boy and later trucker in the Bendigo gold mines.

Around 1909, Maltby moved to Melbourne where he worked as a labourer on the Melbourne Tramways. He later joined the sugar refinery CSR as an engine driver and clerk. In 1911, he joined the Militia (citizen army reserve) and received a commission the next year. In 1913, he married Eliza McDonald, a typist, at the Presbyterian Church in Yarraville.

== Military service ==
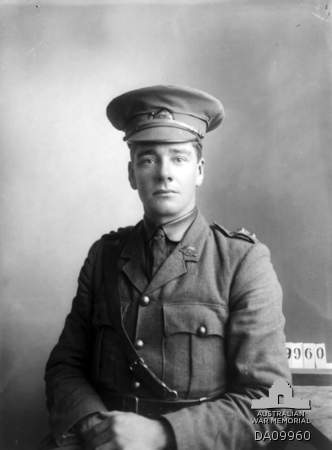
Maltby as a lieutenant in the Australian Army prior to his embarkation to Egypt, August 1915.

Already an officer of the citizens' militia, Maltby was appointed as a lieutenant in the First Australian Imperial Force on 16 May 1915. He embarked for Egypt in September that year, and by March 1916 was fighting on the Western Front with the Australian 5th Battalion. His 11-month-old daughter, Margaret, died of pneumonia on 30 March 1916, while Maltby was serving overseas.

Maltby was wounded twice during the war, once when a bolt from an exploding rifle entered his arm in April 1917. He was mentioned in dispatches before returning to Australia in 1919.

During World War II, Maltby (a serving politician at the time) re-enlisted in the army, where he served as quartermaster general from 1940 to 1943, and was promoted to major.

== Political career ==
After his discharge from the army, Maltby became a storekeeper in Drysdale, then a real estate agent in Geelong. He was active in community affairs, and was president of both the Geelong Returned Sailors', Soldiers' and Airmen's Imperial League and the East Geelong Progress Association (which he had founded).

His first attempt at a career in state politics was in 1924, when he unsuccessfully contested the Victorian lower house seat of Geelong as a Nationalist candidate against sitting Labor member William Brownbill at the 1924 Victorian state election.

Five years later, Maltby was elected to the legislative assembly when he won the state by-election for the seat of Barwon, following the death of the Nationalist member Edward Morley.

=== Crossbencher ===
On two occasions in his political career, Maltby had a split with the United Australia/Liberal Party and sat in the assembly on the crossbenches. In 1941, Maltby advocated for a UAP conference with the United Australia Organisation to discuss reform and reorganisation of the UAO. When the party passed a resolution refusing such a meeting, Maltby walked out of the party room meeting and moved his documents and personal effects to the Independents' room at Parliament House. He did not resign from the UAP, but disassociated himself from his party colleagues and sat on the Opposition crossbenches for several months before returning.

In September 1945, Maltby was one of five Liberal Party members to cross the floor and vote with the Labor Party and the Independents to defeat an appropriation bill. The Country–Liberal coalition government of Albert Dunstan and Thomas Hollway collapsed, and the Governor of Victoria, Sir Winston Dugan commissioned Ian Macfarlan to form a "stop-gap ministry" with the sole purpose of passing supply. Maltby was appointed Deputy Premier, Chief Secretary and Minister for Electrical Undertakings in the short-lived ministry, which lasted from 2 October to 21 November 1945. Maltby was expelled from the Liberal Party for his defection, but was re-admitted to the party in 1946.

=== Speaker of the Legislative Assembly ===
On 2 December 1947, Maltby achieved what he called "a boyhood ambition" when he was elected Speaker of the Victorian Legislative Assembly.

Maltby was knighted in the King's Birthday Honours on 9 June 1949 for his work as Speaker.

=== Hollway Ministry ===
In May 1950, Arthur Warner, the Minister of Electrical Undertakings, asked Premier Tom Hollway to relieve him of his duties due to a conflict of interest involving Warner's association with several electrical companies. Hollway agreed, and Maltby was one of the front runners to replace Warner in the ensuing reshuffle, provided he was not renominated as Speaker. On 19 June, Maltby was sworn into the Electrical Undertakings portfolio, as well as the Mines portfolio previously held by Henry Bolte. However, Maltby's place in cabinet was to be once again short-lived: eight days later, the Hollway government collapsed when the Labor Party agreed to support a minority Country Party government led by John McDonald.

=== Bolte Ministry ===
At the 1955 election, Maltby's electorate of Barwon was abolished, so he stood for and won the seat of Geelong, the seat he had contested over thirty years earlier.

On 7 June, Maltby was made Commissioner of Public Works in the Bolte Ministry. He was also made Minister of Housing but was replaced the next day by Horace Petty. In 1959, Maltby toured public buildings and studied road building and construction in the United States and Britain. He reported on his findings in the Report on his mission abroad, published in Melbourne in the same year.

== Death ==
Maltby died in Geelong, aged 85, on 2 June 1976.

Victorian Legislative Assembly
Preceded by Edward Morley	Member for Barwon; 1929–1955	District abolished
Preceded by James Dunn	Member for Geelong; 1955–1961	Succeeded by Hayden Birrell
Political offices
Preceded by Thomas Hollway	Deputy Premier of Victoria; 1945	Succeeded by Frank Field
Preceded by Herbert Hyland	Chief Secretary; 1945	Succeeded by Bill Slater
Preceded by John McDonald	Minister-in-Charge of Electrical Undertakings; 1945	Succeeded by Pat Kennelly
Preceded by Sir George Knox	Speaker of the Victorian Legislative Assembly; 1947–1950	Succeeded by Archie Michaelis
Preceded by Arthur Warner	Minister-in-Charge of Electrical Undertakings; 1950	Succeeded by Keith Dodgshun
Preceded by John James Sheehan as Minister in Charge of Housing	Minister of Housing; 1955	Succeeded by Horace Petty
Preceded by Samuel Merrifield	Commissioner of Public Works; 1955–1961	Succeeded by Horace Petty
