= Barnadown =

- Suburb
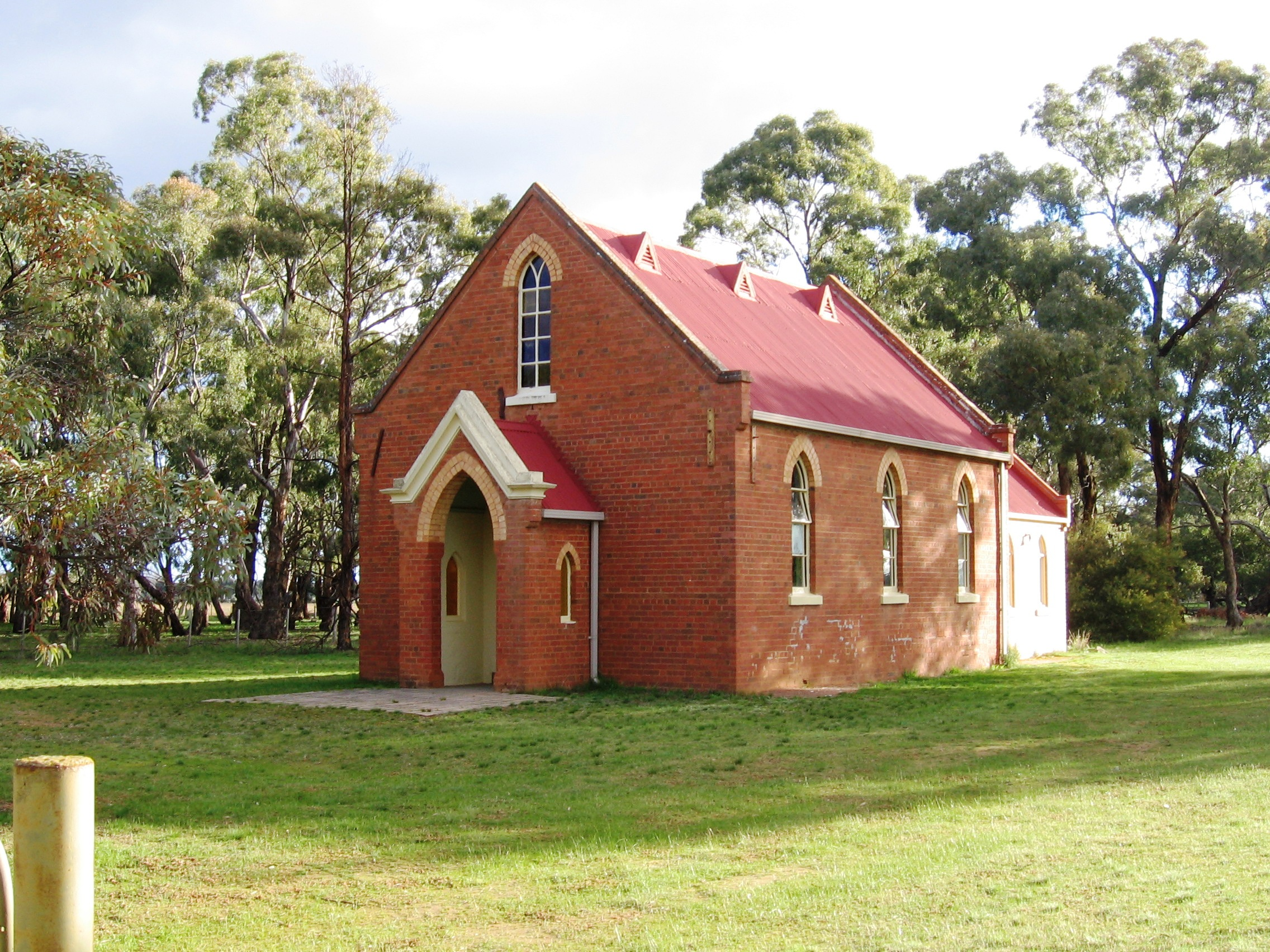
- Uniting church, 2008

- Interactive map of Barnadown
- Coordinates: 36°39′06″S 144°31′21″E
- Country: Australia
- State: Victoria
- City: Bendigo
- LGA: City of Greater Bendigo
- Location: 159 km (99 mi) N of Melbourne; 27 km (17 mi) NE of Bendigo; 6 km (3.7 mi) S of Goornong

Government
  - State electorate: Bendigo East
  - Federal division: Bendigo

Population
  - Total: 17 (2016 census)
- Postcode: 3557

Barnadown is a locality in north central Victoria, Australia. The locality is in the City of Greater Bendigo, 159 kilometres (99 mi) north of the state capital, Melbourne.

At the 2016 census, Barnadown had a population of 17.
