= Ann Henderson (politician) =

Australian politician

The Honourable Ann Henderson

Member of the Victorian Legislative Assembly for Geelong
- In office 3 October 1992 – 17 September 1999
- Preceded by: Hayden Shell
- Succeeded by: Ian Trezise

Personal details
- Born: Ann Mary Corben; 31 December 1941 Melbourne, Victoria, Australia
- Died: 4 June 2002 (aged 60) Melbourne, Victoria, Australia
- Party: Liberal
- Spouse: Michael Henderson (m. 1963; died 1995)
- Children: Sarah Henderson (daughter); Jodie Emmett (daughter); Andrew Henderson (Son)
- Occupation: Administrator

Ann Mary Henderson (née Corben; 31 December 1941 – 4 June 2002) was an Australian politician. She was a member of the Victorian Legislative Assembly from 1992 to 1999, representing the seat of Geelong for the Liberal Party. She held ministerial office in the government of Jeff Kennett, serving as Minister for Housing and Minister Responsible for Aboriginal Affairs.

== Early life ==
Henderson was born in Melbourne on 31 December 1941. She was educated at Kilbreda College and Loreto Mandeville Hall.

Before entering politics, Henderson held various positions with community organisations, including as a welfare and administration officer with Do Care and Legacy Australia, administrator of the Port Fairy music festival, executive officer of the National Trust's Geelong branch, executive officer of the Geelong Art Gallery Foundation, and alumni development officer with Deakin University's public relations branch.

== Politics ==
Henderson was a member of the Liberal Party. She was vice-president (1987–89) and president (1989–1991) of the Newtown branch, and ran as the candidate for Geelong in the 1988 state election, losing to the sitting Labor member. She was successful at her second attempt in 1992. In 1996 she was appointed Minister for Housing and Minister Responsible for Aboriginal Affairs, but she lost her seat in 1999.

== Personal life ==
Henderson had three children, including Sarah Henderson who was elected to federal parliament in 2013. Her husband Michael, who served as mayor of the City of Newtown and stood unsuccessfully for the Liberal Party at the 1982 Victorian state election. She was widowed in 1995.

Henderson died of breast cancer on 4 June 2002, aged 60. She was granted a state funeral at St Mary of the Angels Basilica, Geelong.

Victorian Legislative Assembly
Preceded by Hayden Shell	Member for Geelong; 1992–1999	Succeeded by Ian Trezise
Political offices
Preceded by Rob Knowles	Minister for Housing; 1996–1999	Succeeded by Bronwyn Pike
