= Christine Couzens =

Australian politician

Christine Couzens MP
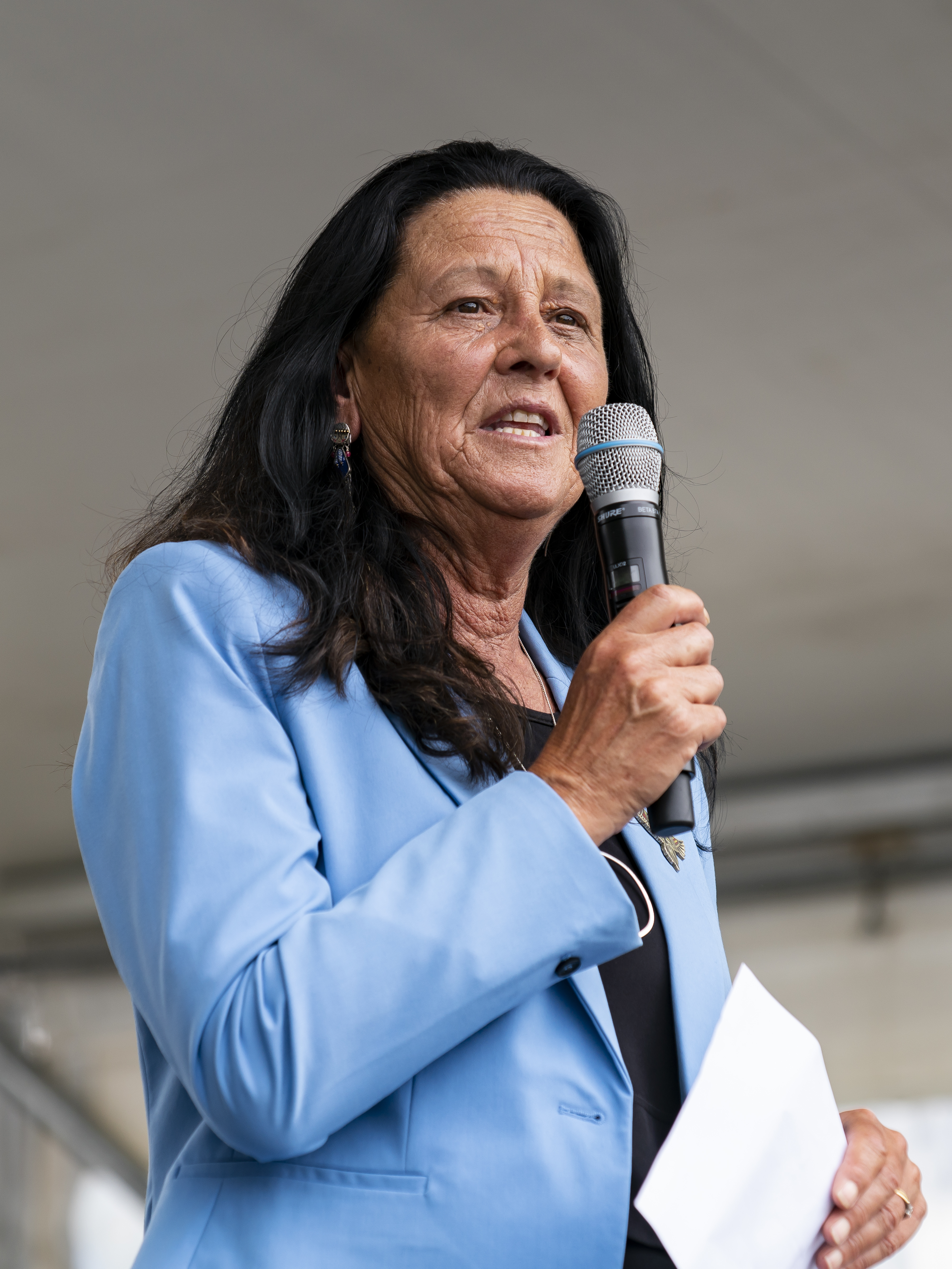
- Couzens at Pako Festa in 2022.

Member of the Victorian Legislative Assembly for Geelong
- Incumbent
- Assumed office 29 November 2014
- Preceded by: Ian Trezise

Personal details
- Born: Christine Anne O'Dwyer; 6 February 1958 (age 68) Geelong, Victoria, Australia
- Party: Labor
- Spouse: Allan Couzens (m. 1974; died 1980)
- Domestic partner: Paul Griffiths
- Education: Victoria University
- Occupation: Community Development Officer
- Website: christinecouzens.com

Christine Anne Couzens (born 6 February 1958) is an Australian politician. She has been a Labor Party member of the Victorian Legislative Assembly since the 2014 state election, representing the seat of Geelong.

== Background ==
Couzens was born and raised in Geelong, and has been a long time resident of Geelong West. She previously worked in the office of the former Member for Geelong Ian Trezise as his electorate officer. At the time of her preselection, she was the vice-president of the Geelong Trades Hall Council and had previously served as the council's president.

Couzens attended Corio Technical School, leaving at the age of 14 to take up work in a cake factory – though "absolutely hated the methodical, monotonous work". Couzens had plans to leave this job and pursue a career as a writer, however these plans fell through when she became pregnant to her then-boyfriend and future husband Allan Couzens – a local Indigenous Australian rules player, at the age of 15. Two months into her pregnancy, in 1973, she was arrested and labelled a "moral danger to society" due to the indecency of her pregnancy. Couzens ended up with a 12-month probation and was ordered by the court judge to marry as soon as she turned 16. Following her marriage, she gave birth to two more children: Andrew when she was 17, and Mark at the age of 19. Her husband died of a heart attack in 1980.

Following the death of her husband, Couzens eventually became a volunteer organising programs and camps for Corio Community Health, saying of the time that it "was just something to do". This soon led to gaining employment as a youth worker employed by the Shire of Corio. She eventually became community development officer, helping create a neighbourhood house before going on to run the regional housing council.

In the years that followed, Couzens began a degree in social science while working full time, often completing assignments after midnight as her children slept. At this time, she had settled with her long-term partner Paul Griffiths, who she met in 1981.

== Political career ==
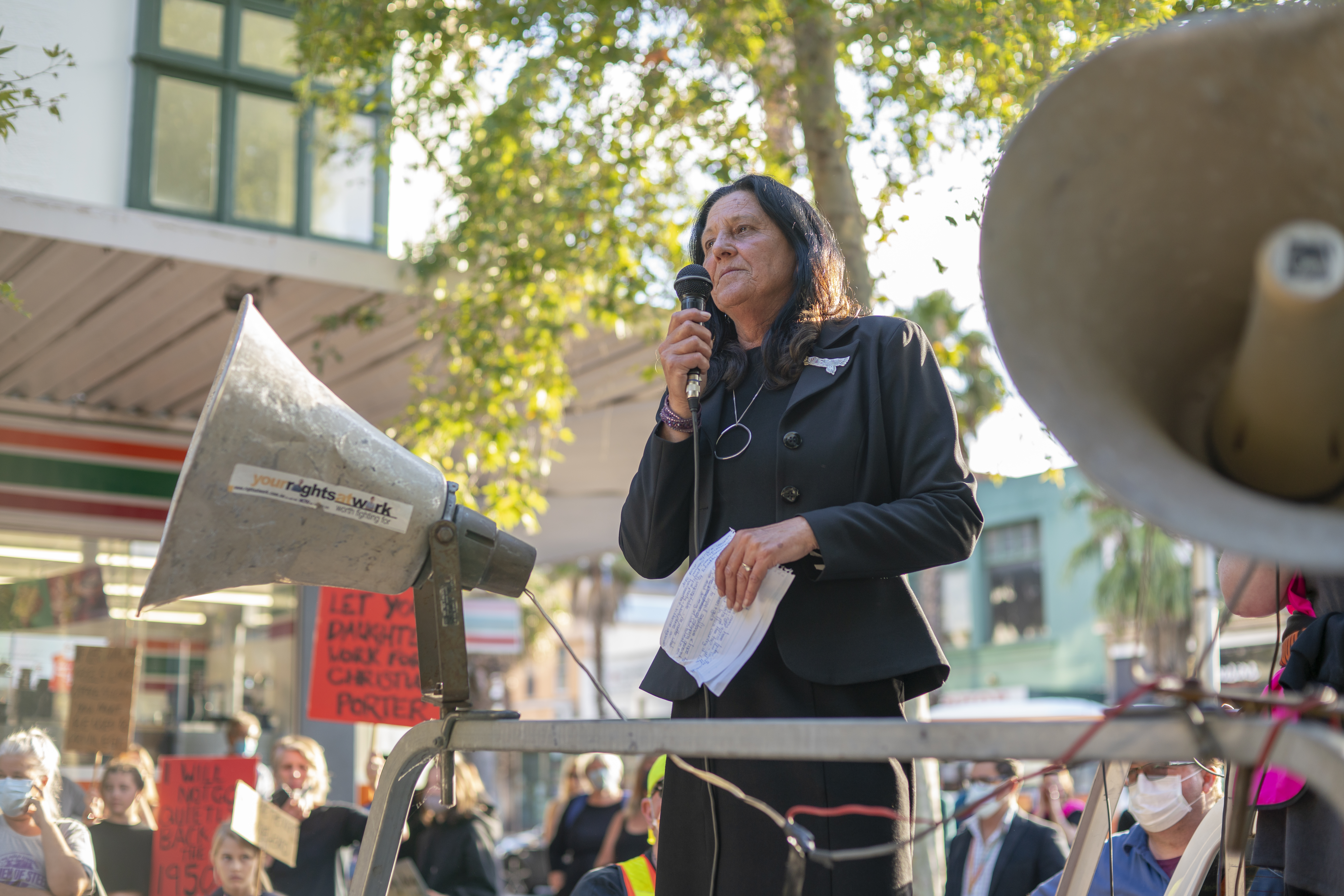
Couzens speaking at the March 4 Justice rally in Geelong. Photo: Matt Hrkac.

Couzens contested the 2006 state election in the unwinnable fourth position on the Labor ticket in the Legislative Council's Western Victoria Region. She also previously contested Labor preselection for the federal seat of Corangamite for the 2007 election.

Couzens won preselection for the state seat of Geelong for the 2014 election unopposed, following the retirement of Ian Trezise. She defeated Liberal candidate Paula Kontelj.

Victorian Legislative Assembly
Preceded by Ian Trezise	Member for Geelong; 2014–present	Incumbent
