= William McAdam (Australian politician) =

Australian politician

William James McAdam (7 January 1882 – 28 June 1967) was an Australian politician.

== Early life and education ==
William James McAdam was born on 7 January 1882 in Emerald Hill (now South Melbourne), Victoria, to blacksmith Alexander McAdam and Mary Ann Vigar. He was educated at state schools in Ballarat before beginning work as a bread carter in 1904 and becoming an organizer for the Bread Carters Union, later serving as its secretary from that year until 1924.

== Career ==
He became an organiser with the Ballarat Municipal Employees section of the Shop Assistants and Textile Workers Union in 1916, and federal secretary of the union from 1917 to 1924.

In 1916, he joined the Ballarat Municipal Employees section of the Shop Assistants and Textile Workers Union, then served as its federal secretary from 1917 to 1924. From 1920 to 1924, he was president of the Ballarat Trades and Labour Council, a position he returned to hold from 1947 to 1956.

From 1920 to 1924 he was president of the Ballarat Trades and Labour Council (he would hold the position again from 1947 to 1956). In 1924 he was elected to the Victorian Legislative Assembly as the Labor member for Ballarat East; he transferred to Ballarat in 1927, and was defeated in 1932. He made unsuccessful attempts to return to politics via a by-election for Allandale in 1933, Ballarat in 1935, and the Senate in 1940. McAdam died at Ballarat in 1967 and is buried in Ballaarat Old Cemetery.

== Personal life ==
On 21 February 1905 he married Sarah Robin, with whom he had four daughters.
