= Hayden Birrell =

Australian politician

Hayden Wilson Birrell (1923 – 24 December 1994), was an Australian politician.

Birrell was born in Geelong to accountant Stanley Wilson Birrell and Alice Hayden George. He was educated at Chilwell and then at Geelong College, graduating at fourteen to become an accountant. He served in the Citizen Military Forces from 1939 to 1941 and in the Royal Australian Navy from 1941 to 1946, in which he was a petty officer. He subsequently returned to work for the State Savings Bank of Victoria, and joined the Liberal Party in 1950, partly motivated by the Labor Party's policy of bank nationalisation.

In 1961 Birrell was elected to the Victorian Legislative Assembly for Geelong. He moved seats to Geelong West in 1976 and served until 1982. On 2 June 1945 he had married Rae Langley Crouch, with whom he had two children. He died in 1994.

Victorian Legislative Assembly
Preceded by Thomas Maltby	Member for Geelong; 1961–1976	Abolished
New seat	Member for Geelong West; 1976–1982	Succeeded by Hayden Shell
