= William Plain =

Australian politician

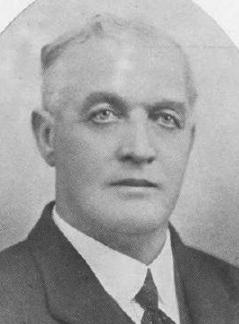

Senator for Victoria
- In office 1 July 1917 – 30 June 1923
- In office 25 August 1925 – 30 June 1938
- Preceded by: Edward Russell

Personal details
- Born: 11 March 1868 Peeblesshire, Scotland
- Died: 14 October 1961 (aged 93) Geelong, Victoria, Australia
- Party: Labor (1908–17); Nationalist (1917–31); UAP (1931–38)
- Occupation: Farm worker, goldminer

William Plain (11 March 1868 – 14 October 1961) was a Scottish-born Australian politician.

Born in Scotland, to James and Christina (née Naismith) Plain, where he was educated, he migrated to Australia in 1890, where he became a farm worker and gold miner at Lara, Victoria. In 1908, he was elected to the Victorian Legislative Assembly as the Labor member for Geelong. He was also President of the Board of Land and Works and Commissioner of Crown Lands and Survey in 1913, as well as Minister for Water Supply and Agriculture. He left the Labor Party in the wake of the 1916 split over conscription, joining the Nationalist Party.

In 1917, he left the Assembly to contest the Australian Senate as a Nationalist candidate for Victoria. He was defeated in 1922, but was re-elected in 1925; he was appointed early to the Senate after the death of Edward Russell. Plain served as Chairman of Committees from 1926 to 1932. In 1931 he joined the new United Australia Party. He was defeated in 1937 and died on 14 October 1961 at Geelong. Plain was buried in the Presbyterian section at the Geelong Western Cemetery with his sister Elizabeth, who had died in 1960. Plain's wife Anna, who died in 1969 and their son Norman, who died in 1977 were subsequently buried in the same grave.
