= Philip Grimwade =

Australian politician

Philip Sheppard Grimwade (9 April 1912 – 7 September 1961) was an Australian politician.

He was born in Geelong to medical practitioner Alfred Sheppard Grimwade and Amy Gertrude Tanner. He attended Geelong College, and was a farmer at Geelong from 1930. In 1936 he purchased property at Broadford. During World War II he served 20th Motor Regiment. He was from a political family, being the grandson of Frederick Sheppard Grimwade and uncle of Fred Grimwade. He served on Pyalong Shire Council from 1939 to 1961, and was president from 1943 to 1944 and from 1956 to 1957. In 1947 he was elected to the Victorian Legislative Assembly as the Liberal member for Goulburn, but he was defeated after a single term in 1950. Grimwade died in East Melbourne in 1961.

Victorian Legislative Assembly
Preceded by Joseph Smith	Member for Goulburn; 1947–1950	Succeeded by Joseph Smith
