= William Brownbill =

Australian politician

Member of the Victorian Parliament for Geelong
- In office 21 October 1920 – 22 April 1932
- Preceded by: Robert Purnell
- Succeeded by: Edward Austin
- In office 2 March 1935 – 29 April 1938
- Preceded by: Edward Austin
- Succeeded by: Fanny Brownbill

Personal details
- Born: 19 January 1864 Newtown, Geelong, Victoria
- Died: 29 April 1938 (aged 74) Geelong, Victoria, Australia
- Party: Labor Party
- Spouse(s): Margaret Forrester Murray (1887–1913; her death); Fanny Brownbill (1920–1938; his death)
- Children: 6
- Occupation: Baker

William Brownbill (19 January 1864 – 29 April 1938) was an Australian politician. He was a member of the Victorian Legislative Assembly on two occasions from 1920 to 1932, then from 1935 until his death in 1938. He represented the electoral district of Geelong for the Labor Party. Upon his death, he was succeeded as member for Geelong by his second wife, Fanny.

== Family ==
William Brownbill was born in Newtown, a suburb of Geelong on 19 January 1864. His parents were William Brownbill (1824—1863), an Irish emigrant shopkeeper, and Margaret Brownbill (1828—1903), née Tattersall from the Isle of Man. Brownbill worked initially in his brother's jewellery shop, but became a baker's apprentice and by around 1895 was a master baker. His first wife was Margaret Murray whom he married in 1887 and with whom he had three sons and a daughter. Margaret died in 1913, and in 1920 he married his housekeeper, Fanny Alford, with whom he had a son and a daughter.

== Politics ==
In 1896, Brownbill was elected to the Geelong City Council, and served as Mayor of Geelong from 1914 to 1915. In 1920, he ran for election to state parliament, winning the seat of Geelong for the Labor Party. In 1932, he was defeated in the election by Edward Austin, but re-contested and regained the seat in 1935.

== Death ==
Brownbill died in 1938, and the ensuing by-election saw his widow, Fanny Brownbill, elected as his replacement — the first woman representing the Labor Party to be elected to a parliamentary seat in Victoria.

Victorian Legislative Assembly
Preceded by Robert Purnell	Member for Geelong; 1920–1932	Succeeded by Edward Austin
Preceded by Edward Austin	Member for Geelong; 1935–1938	Succeeded by Fanny Brownbill
