= James Dunn (Victorian politician) =

Australian politician (1886–1975)

James Hector McRae Dunn (22 April 1886 – 8 November 1975) was an Australian politician.

He was born in Cathkin to farmer James Dunn and Honoria McRae. He attended state school and Scotch College, Melbourne, becoming the paymaster of a coal mine at Wonthaggi, where he was a founding member of the local Coal Miners' Union. In 1906 he married Mary Buchanan, with whom he had five children. He later worked for the railways, and was stores administrator for the Federal Capital Commission's construction branch from 1915. There he organised the first Labor Party branch in the Australian Capital Territory. From 1932 he ran a wine saloon in Geelong, and was private secretary to John Dedman, a federal minister.

In 1950, he was elected to the Victorian Legislative Assembly as the Labor member for Geelong. He lost preselection in 1955 and stood unsuccessfully as an Independent Labor candidate for Geelong West. He rejoined the Labor Party later in life. Dunn retired to Cathkin and died at Alexandra in 1975.

Victorian Legislative Assembly
Preceded by Edward Montgomery	Member for Geelong; 1950–1955	Succeeded by Thomas Maltby
