= Electoral district of Goulburn (Victoria) =

Former state electoral district of Victoria, Australia

Goulburn Victoria—Legislative Assembly
- State: Victoria
- Created: 1945
- Abolished: 1955
- Namesake: Goulburn Valley
- Demographic: Rural
- Coordinates: 36°23′S 144°24′E

Electoral district of Goulburn was an electoral district of the Legislative Assembly in the Australian state of Victoria. It was preceded by the Electoral district of Goulburn Valley, which was abolished in 1945.

== Members ==
Member	Party	Term
Joseph Smith	Labor	1945–1947
Philip Grimwade	Liberal	1947–1950
Joseph Smith	Labor	1950–1955
