= Joseph Smith (Australian politician) =

Australian politician

Joseph Henry Smith (17 March 1904 – 2 April 1993) was an Australian politician.

He was born in Mansfield to farmer Sidney Gordon Smith and Isabella Martin. He attended state schools and worked on the family farm, and worked briefly for the Electricity Commission before becoming an engine cleaner. In the Great Depression he was unemployed, but he later rejoined the railways and became an engine driver. On 11 August 1934 he married Thelma Duffield, with whom he had two children. He was an active member of the Labor Party and served as chairman of the Australian Federated Union of Locomotive Enginemen. In 1945 he was elected to the Victorian Legislative Assembly for Goulburn. He was defeated in 1947 but re-elected in 1950. From 1952 to 1953 he was Assistant Minister of Lands, and from 1953 to 1955 Minister of Lands, Soldier Settlement and Conservation. His seat was abolished in 1955 and he was defeated contesting Broadmeadows. He farmed near Seymour after leaving politics, and ultimately retired to Queensland. Smith died in 1993. His brother Arthur Smith was also a member of the Victorian Parliament.

Victorian Legislative Assembly
New seat	Member for Goulburn; 1945–1947	Succeeded by Philip Grimwade
Preceded by Philip Grimwade	Member for Goulburn; 1950–1955	Abolished
