= Edward Montgomery (Australian politician) =

Australian politician

Edward Hugh Montgomery (5 July 1906 – 8 June 1986) was an Australian politician and teacher.

Born in Ballarat, Montgomery attended Ballarat Grammar School and the Gordon Institute, where he studied education. He was an assistant master at Ballarat Grammar School from 1928 to 1940 and at Geelong Grammar School from 1941 to 1948. In 1948 Montgomery was elected to the Victorian Legislative Assembly in a by-election for the seat of Geelong, representing the Liberal Party. He was defeated in 1950 and returned to Geelong Grammar School, where he became the founding headmaster of the school's Timbertop annexe, retiring from that post in 1963. In 1965 he moved to Queensland to become a registrar with the Anglican diocese of Rockhampton, returning to Ballarat to retire in 1974. Montgomery died in 1986.

Victorian Legislative Assembly
Preceded by Fanny Brownbill	Member for Geelong; 1948–1950	Succeeded by James Dunn
