= Electoral district of Ballarat =

Former electoral district of Victoria, Australia

Ballarat Victoria—Legislative Assembly
- State: Victoria
- Created: 1927
- Abolished: 1955
- Demographic: Urban
- Coordinates: 37°33′S 143°51′E

Ballarat was an electoral district of the Legislative Assembly in the Australian state of Victoria. It was created in the redistribution preceding the 1927 election, its area mainly consisting of the former districts of Ballarat West and Ballarat East.

For most of its existence, it was held by Premier Thomas Hollway, from 1932 to 1952.

It was abolished in the redistribution preceding the 1955 election, being split into Ballarat North and Ballarat South.

== Members for Ballarat ==
| Member | Party | Term |
|---|---|---|
| William McAdam | Labor | 1927–1932 |
| Thomas Hollway | United Australia | 1932–1945 |
| Thomas Hollway | Liberal / LCP | 1945–1952 |
| Thomas Hollway | Independent | 1952 |
| Thomas Hollway | Electoral Reform | 1952 |
| John Sheehan | Labor | 1952–1955 |
