= Fanny Brownbill =

Australian politician

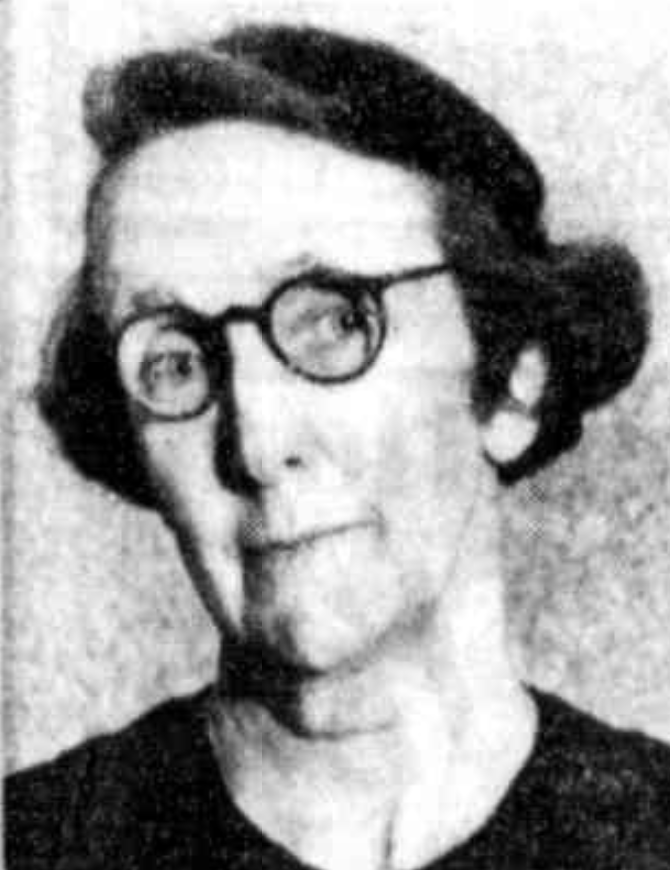

Member of the Victorian Parliament for Geelong
- In office 11 June 1938 – 10 October 1948
- Preceded by: William Brownbill
- Succeeded by: Edward Montgomery

Personal details
- Born: Fanny Eileen Alford; 28 April 1890 Modewarre, Victoria
- Died: 10 October 1948 (aged 58) Geelong, Victoria, Australia
- Party: Labor Party
- Spouse: William Brownbill

Fanny Eileen Brownbill (28 April 1890 – 10 October 1948) was an Australian state politician, serving as the Labor Party Member for Geelong, Victoria, serving from 1938 until her death in 1948. Brownbill was the first woman to win a seat for Labor in Victoria.

== Early life and career ==
Brownbill was born Fanny Alford, the youngest of seven children, in Modewarre, Victoria, to an Australian father, James Alford, and English mother, Ann Abbot. In 1913, she became a housekeeper to William Brownbill, a baker and widower with four children. They married in 1920, and that same year, William entered Parliament as the Labor Member for Geelong in the Legislative Assembly. He served again after an electoral defeat, in total serving 15 years as the MLA for Geelong.

Upon William's death while in office in 1938, Fanny contested the seat, winning comfortably, and became the first Labor woman to win a parliamentary seat in Victoria, the first woman elected from a non-metropolitan area, and the second Labor woman to do so in Australia. She served for ten years until 1948, when she died suffering from heart disease.

Brownbill's particular political passions were the welfare of women, children and the aged. In her maiden speech, she spoke of a mother's life of sacrifice, and urged the Railways Commissioners to allow perambulators on the railways. One of her many achievements was the establishment of Grace McKellar House, a nursing home for the elderly, which is still operating today.

Her by-election was, at times, dramatically fought, with statements from the leader of the United Australia Party, the conservative party of the day, claiming that women were not suited to politics. From The Argus newspaper: "Speaking in support of Mr R. H. Weddell, the endorsed U.A.P. candidate for the Geelong seat, at Geelong West on Monday, the Federal Treasurer (Mr. Casey) expressed doubt whether there was a place for women in politics...'If there is a place for women in politics,' added Mr Casey, 'it is probably in the Legislative Council or in the Senate, where things are quieter and the old gentlemen occasionally drowse into their beards. My advice is, however good a woman may be, to stick to a man for what has always been recognised in the past to be a man's job." – The Argus, 1 June 1938.

Brownbill fought back, stating: "As for his remark that he doubted whether any woman, intellectually of otherwise, could stand up to men of equal ability, it is so audacious and conceited that it almost takes my breath away. What a high opinion Mr Casey has of men, and what a low one of women."

From 1943 to 1948 she was the sole female Member of Parliament after Country/Independent Ivy Weber resigned. After Brownbill's death in 1948, she was described by Acting Premier John McDonald as "...the embodiment of tolerance. Her charming personality had endeared her to all in the chamber, irrespective of the party." In addition, both Mr William Galvin and Mr Trevor Oldham gave glowing tributes to Mrs Brownbill It was nearly 20 years before another woman was elected to the Victorian Parliament, when Dorothy Goble won the seat of Mitcham in 1967.

In 2003 Brownbill was inducted to the Victorian Honour Roll of Women.

Victorian Legislative Assembly
Preceded by William Brownbill	Member for Geelong; 1938–1948	Succeeded by Edward Montgomery
