= John Sheehan (Australian politician) =

Australian politician

John James Sheehan (9 May 1916 – 4 June 1984) was an Australian politician.

He was born in Ballarat to clerk James Sheehan and Cecilia Leach. He attended St Patrick's College, Melbourne Teachers' College and the University of Melbourne, receiving a Bachelor of Arts and a Diploma of Education. He became a schoolteacher at Rushworth but soon enlisted in the AIF, serving during World War II in New Guinea and Bougainville. On his return he became a senior master at Ballarat High School. In 1952 he was elected to the Victorian Legislative Assembly as the Labor member for Ballarat. He was appointed Minister of Housing on 1 April 1955. The seat was split in two in 1955, and Sheehan was defeated contesting Ballarat South. On 17 August 1954 he had married Theresa Carmel Reid, with whom he had five children. He returned to his position at Ballarat High, and in 1959 moved to Ballarat East High School, of which he was deputy principal from 1968 to 1972. He returned to Ballarat High in 1972 as principal, holding the position until 1976. Sheehan died in Ballarat in 1984.

Victorian Legislative Assembly
| Preceded by Thomas Hollway | Member for Ballarat; 1952–1955 | Abolished |
