= Electoral district of Geelong =

State electoral district of Victoria, Australia

Coordinates: 38°09′S 144°21′E

Geelong Victoria—Legislative Assembly
- Interactive map of electoral district boundaries from the 2022 state election
- State: Victoria
- Dates current: 1856–1859; 1877–1976; 1985–present
- MP: Christine Couzens
- Party: Labor
- Namesake: Geelong
- Electors: 47,575 (2018)
- Area: 328 km^{2} (126.6 sq mi)
- Demographic: Urban
Electorates around Geelong:
Eureka	Eureka	Lara
Eureka	Geelong	Port Phillip Bay
South Barwon	South Barwon	Bellarine

The electoral district of Geelong is an electoral district of the Victorian Legislative Assembly. It centres on inner metropolitan Geelong and following the June 2013 redistribution of electoral boundaries includes the suburbs of Belmont, Breakwater, East Geelong, Geelong, Geelong West, Newtown and South Geelong, Herne Hill, Manifold Heights, Newcomb, Newtown, St Albans Park, Thomson, Whittington and part of Fyansford.

The seat first existed from 1856 to 1859 as a four-member seat. It was split into Geelong East and Geelong West in 1859, but re-created in 1876 as a three-member seat. It was cut back to a two-member seat in 1889 and became a single-member seat in 1904. It was abolished in 1976 but re-created in 1985.

In its current incarnation, it has historically been a marginal seat with demographics similar to the state at large. As such, it was held by the governing party of the day from 1985 to 2010. Incomes vary strongly across the seat.

It was won in 1999 by Ian Trezise for the ALP by 16 votes after recounts. The Victorian Parliament was hung at that election, and the results for the seat of Geelong, which took several days to arrive at, had a significant impact on the events that brought the Bracks government to power. At the 2002 election, the seat's margin grew to 8.1%, however, neither major party considered it safe due to its history as a marginal seat. Trezise narrowly held it for Labor in the 2010 election, becoming the first opposition member for this seat in its current incarnation.

The 2014 Victorian state election saw boundary changes and Christine Couzens retained the seat for the ALP following the retirement of Trezise. In 2018, she fended off a strong challenge from an independent candidate, Darren Lyons, a former mayor of Geelong. At the next election, she managed a swing to her on the 2PP and secured the best margin for Labor in this seat in 70 years.

== Members for Geelong ==
First incarnation (1856–1859, 4 members)
Member 1	Term	Member 2	Term	Member 3	Term	Member 4	Term
Sir Charles Sladen	1856–1857	Alexander Fyfe	1856–1857	Charles Read	1856–1858	John Brooke	1856–1859
Alexander Thomson	1857–1859	George Board	1858–1859	James Harrison	1858–1859	John Brooke	1856–1859

Split into Geelong East and Geelong West in 1859

Second incarnation (1877–1976), 3 members initially, two from 1889, 1 from 1904
Member 1	Term	Member 2	Term	Member 3	Term
Charles Kernot	1877–1880	Robert de Bruce Johnstone	1877–1881	Sir Graham Berry	1877–1886
Charles Andrews Sr.	1880	Robert de Bruce Johnstone	1877–1881	Sir Graham Berry	1877–1886
Charles Kernot	1880–1882	George Cunningham	1881–1886	Sir Graham Berry	1877–1886
Joseph Connor	1882–1886	George Cunningham	1881–1886	Sir Graham Berry	1877–1886
Charles Andrews Sr.	1886–1894	James Munro	1886–1892	John Donaghy	1886–1889
Charles Andrews Sr.	1886–1894	John Rout Hopkins	1892–1894		
H. B. Higgins	1894–1900	William Gurr	1894–1902		
Charles Andrews Jr.	1900–1904	George Martin	1902–1904		

Member	Party	Term
William Colechin	Labor	1904–1907
William Gurr	Ministerialist	1907–1908
William Plain	Labor	1908–1916
William Plain	Nationalist	1916–1917
Robert Purnell	Nationalist	1917–1920
William Brownbill	Labor	1920–1932
Edward Austin	United Australia	1932–1935
William Brownbill	Labor	1935–1938
Fanny Brownbill	Labor	1938–1948
Edward Montgomery	Liberal/Liberal and Country	1948–1950
James Dunn	Labor	1950–1955
Sir Thomas Maltby	Liberal and Country	1955–1961
Hayden Birrell	Liberal and Country/Liberal	1961–1976

Third incarnation (1985–present, 1 member)
Member	Party	Term
Hayden Shell	Labor	1985–1992
Ann Henderson	Liberal	1992–1999
Ian Trezise	Labor	1999–2014
Christine Couzens	Labor	2014–present

== Election results ==
2022 Victorian state election: Geelong
Party	Candidate	Votes	%	±%
Labor	Christine Couzens	20,754	46.4	+4.5
Liberal	James Bennett-Hullin	12,194	27.2	+5.3
Greens	Aleisha Smith	6,849	15.3	+6.3
Family First	Madeleine Parker-Hill	2,051	4.6	+4.6
Animal Justice	Bob Motta	1,465	3.3	+0.2
Ind. (Socialist Alliance)	Angela Carr	994	2.2	+2.2
Independent	Stephen Juhasz	455	1.0	+1.0
Total formal votes		44,762	95.9	+0.4
Informal votes		1,918	4.1	−0.4
Turnout		46,680	89.1	−1.1
Two-party-preferred result
Labor	Christine Couzens	28,965	64.7	+4.4
Liberal	James Bennett-Hullin	15,797	35.3	−4.4
Labor hold		Swing	+4.4	

=== Graphical summary ===
Two-party preferred results in Geelong since 1911. View source data.

== Historical maps ==
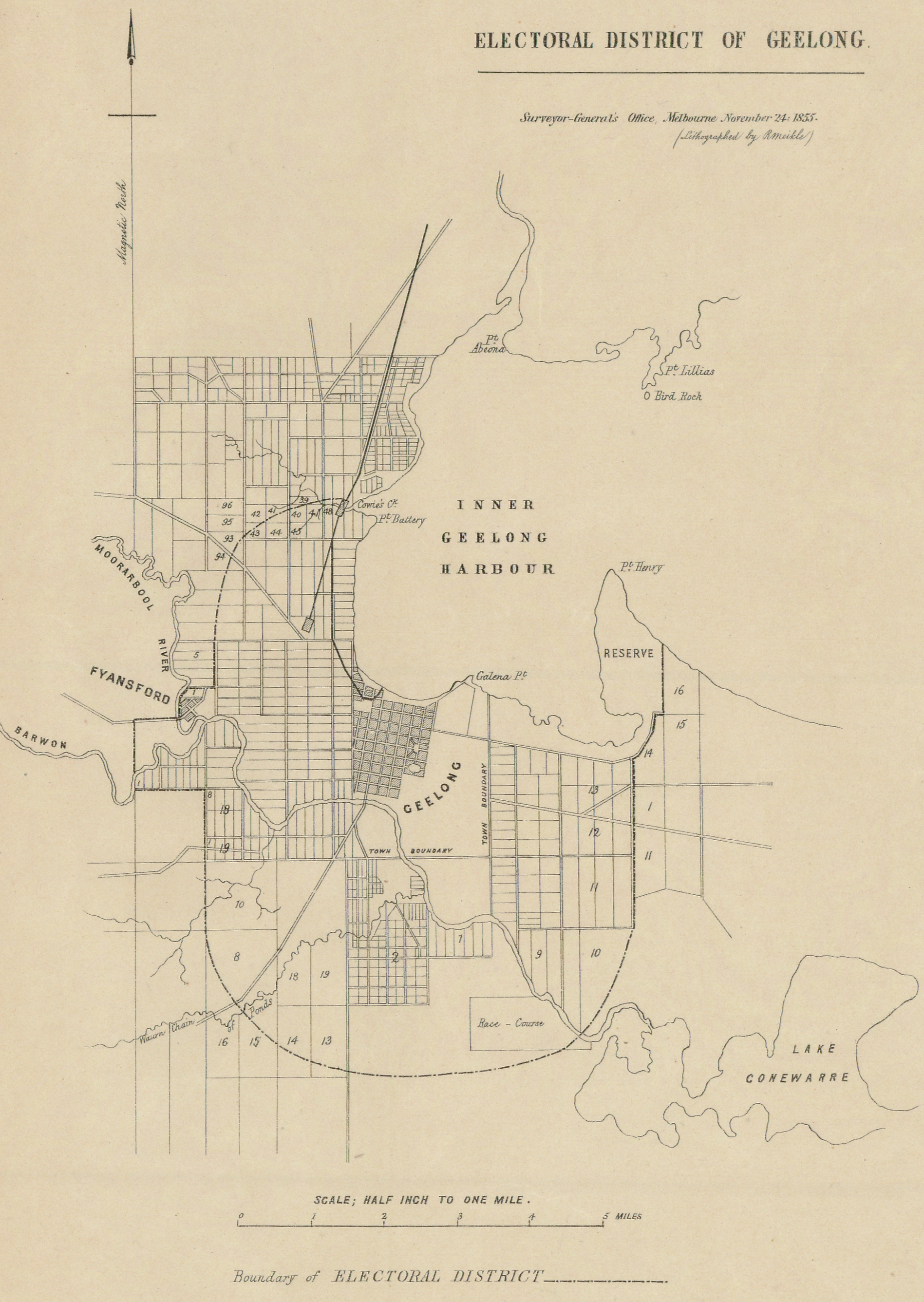
Map of the district of Geelong in 1856
