= Electoral results for the district of Gippsland South =

Victoria, Australia, district election results

This is a list of electoral results for the Electoral district of Gippsland South in Victorian state elections.

== Members for Gippsland South ==
Member	Party	Term
Angus McMillan	Unaligned	1859–1860
George Hedley	Unaligned	1859–1860
John Johnson	Unaligned	1862–1864
Peter Snodgrass	Unaligned	1864–1867
Thomas McCombie	Unaligned	1867–1869
George Macartney	Unaligned	1869–1871
Francis Mason	Unaligned	1871–1877
George Macartney	Unaligned	1877–1878
Francis Mason	Unaligned	1878–1886
Arthur Groom	Unaligned	1886–1889
Francis Mason	Unaligned	1889–1902
Thomas Livingston	Ministerialist	1902–1922
Thomas Livingston	Commonwealth Liberal	1902–1922
Thomas Livingston	Nationalist	1902–1922
Walter West	Nationalist	1922–1927
Henry Bodman	Independent	1927
Walter West	Nationalist	1927–1929
Sir Herbert Hyland	Country	1929–1970
James Taylor	Liberal	1970–1973
Neil McInnes	National	1973–1982
Neil McInnes	Liberal	1973–1982
Tom Wallace	National	1982–1992
Peter Ryan	National	1992–2015
Danny O'Brien	National	2015–present

== Election results ==
=== Elections in the 2020s ===
2022 Victorian state election: Gippsland South
Party	Candidate	Votes	%	±%
National	Danny O'Brien	22,566	53.3	−5.3
Labor	Denise Ryan	9,920	23.4	−4.8
Greens	Jay Tiziani-Simpson	3,538	8.3	−0.9
Independent	Clay Esler	2,414	5.7	+5.7
Freedom	Angela Newnham	1,357	3.2	+3.2
Animal Justice	Helen Jeges	1,350	3.2	+3.2
Family First	Paul Furlong	1,218	2.9	+2.9
Total formal votes		42,363	94.7	+0.4
Informal votes		2,354	5.3	−0.4
Turnout		44,717	90.0	
Two-party-preferred result
National	Danny O'Brien	27,645	65.2	+1.2
Labor	Denise Ryan	14,723	34.8	−1.2
National hold		Swing	+1.2	

=== Elections in the 2010s ===
2018 Victorian state election: Gippsland South
Party	Candidate	Votes	%	±%
National	Danny O'Brien	22,813	61.9	+4.6
Labor	Denise Ryan	10,464	28.4	+6.5
Greens	Ian Onley	3,573	9.7	+0.1
Total formal votes		36,850	94.5	−0.0
Informal votes		2,131	5.5	+0.0
Turnout		38,981	91.6	−2.9
Two-party-preferred result
National	Danny O'Brien	24,110	65.3	−0.4
Labor	Denise Ryan	12,797	34.7	+0.4
National hold		Swing	−0.4	

2015 Gippsland South state by-election
Party	Candidate	Votes	%	±%
National	Danny O'Brien	15,101	45.2	−12.0
Liberal	Scott Rossetti	8,873	26.6	+26.6
Greens	Andrea Millsom	5,244	15.7	+6.1
Independent	Deb Meester	1,151	3.4	+3.4
Independent	Warren Sanders	1,126	3.4	+3.4
Independent	Viv Pepper	1,108	3.3	+3.3
Liberal Democrats	Jim McDonald	449	1.3	+1.3
Independent	Gerard J. Donohue	330	1.0	+1.0
Total formal votes		33,382	94.5	−0.0
Informal votes		1,946	5.5	+0.0
Turnout		35,328	86.9	−7.1
National	Danny O'Brien	17,019	51.0	n/a
Liberal	Scott Rossetti	9,509	28.5	n/a
Greens	Andrea Millsom	6,854	20.5	n/a
National hold		Swing	n/a	

2014 Victorian state election: Gippsland South
Party	Candidate	Votes	%	±%
National	Peter Ryan	20,468	57.3	−6.6
Labor	Lynn Psaila	7,819	21.9	+3.0
Greens	Ian Onley	3,436	9.6	−0.3
Country Alliance	Deb Meester	1,853	5.2	−2.2
Independent	Phil Piper	1,093	3.1	+3.1
Rise Up Australia	Patrick Winterton	1,076	3.0	+3.0
Total formal votes		35,745	94.5	−1.1
Informal votes		2,082	5.5	+1.1
Turnout		37,827	94.0	+1.2
Two-party-preferred result
National	Peter Ryan	23,503	65.7	−6.9
Labor	Lynn Psaila	12,289	34.3	+6.9
National hold		Swing	−6.9	

2010 Victorian state election: Gippsland South
Party	Candidate	Votes	%	±%
National	Peter Ryan	22,479	63.82	+22.36
Labor	Steve Boyce	6,647	18.87	−3.37
Greens	Kate Jackson	3,495	9.92	+3.26
Country Alliance	John Hirt	2,602	7.39	+7.39
Total formal votes		35,223	95.62	+0.24
Informal votes		1,615	4.38	−0.24
Turnout		36,838	93.94	+0.30
Two-party-preferred result
National	Peter Ryan	25,573	72.59	+6.86
Labor	Steve Boyce	9,655	27.41	−6.86
National hold		Swing	+6.86	

=== Elections in the 2000s ===
2006 Victorian state election: Gippsland South
Party	Candidate	Votes	%	±%
National	Peter Ryan	13,818	41.5	+2.8
Labor	Steve Boyce	7,413	22.2	−6.3
Liberal	Simon Wilson	6,100	18.3	−2.8
Independent	Jo McCubbin	2,281	6.8	+6.8
Greens	Jackie Dargaville	2,221	6.7	−5.0
Family First	Clare Heath	1,357	4.1	+4.1
Citizens Electoral Council	Theo Alblas	135	0.4	+0.4
Total formal votes		33,325	95.4	−1.6
Informal votes		1,615	4.6	+1.6
Turnout		34,940	93.6	
Two-party-preferred result
National	Peter Ryan	21,932	65.8	+4.9
Labor	Steve Boyce	11,393	34.2	−4.9
National hold		Swing	+4.9	

2002 Victorian state election: Gippsland South
Party	Candidate	Votes	%	±%
National	Peter Ryan	12,891	38.7	−4.6
Labor	Gregg Cook	9,505	28.5	−0.8
Liberal	Jim Forbes	7,015	21.1	+14.4
Greens	Chris Aitken	3,905	11.7	+11.7
Total formal votes		33,316	97.0	−0.5
Informal votes		1,027	3.0	+0.5
Turnout		34,343	94.1	
Two-party-preferred result
National	Peter Ryan	20,274	60.9	+2.9
Labor	Gregg Cook	13,042	39.1	−2.9
National hold		Swing	+2.9	

=== Elections in the 1990s ===
1999 Victorian state election: Gippsland South
Party	Candidate	Votes	%	±%
National	Peter Ryan	15,130	50.5	−17.2
Labor	Howard Emanuel	9,955	33.2	+4.7
Independent	Mal Sayers	4,411	14.7	+14.7
Natural Law	Rohin Clarke	456	1.5	−2.2
Total formal votes		29,952	97.4	−0.9
Informal votes		800	2.6	+0.9
Turnout		30,752	93.9	
Two-party-preferred result
National	Peter Ryan	17,238	57.5	−11.9
Labor	Howard Emanuel	12,740	42.5	+11.9
National hold		Swing	−11.9	

1996 Victorian state election: Gippsland South
Party	Candidate	Votes	%	±%
National	Peter Ryan	20,747	67.7	+2.4
Labor	Jim Walton	8,739	28.5	+5.4
Natural Law	Colin Barnes	1,151	3.8	+3.8
Total formal votes		30,637	98.3	+0.5
Informal votes		538	1.7	−0.5
Turnout		31,175	94.6	
Two-party-preferred result
National	Peter Ryan	21,258	69.4	−4.5
Labor	Jim Walton	9,353	30.6	+4.5
National hold		Swing	−4.5	

1992 Victorian state election: Gippsland South
Party	Candidate	Votes	%	±%
National	Peter Ryan	19,879	65.3	+17.2
Labor	Brian Burleigh	7,035	23.1	−3.1
Independent	Roger Stephens	2,596	8.5	+8.5
Independent	Vaughan Wareham	934	3.1	+3.1
Total formal votes		30,444	97.7	−0.3
Informal votes		706	2.3	+0.3
Turnout		31,150	95.2	
Two-party-preferred result
National	Peter Ryan	22,490	73.9	+2.9
Labor	Brian Burleigh	7,937	26.1	−2.9
National hold		Swing	+2.9	

=== Elections in the 1980s ===
1988 Victorian state election: Gippsland South
Party	Candidate	Votes	%	±%
National	Tom Wallace	13,951	48.00	−0.93
Labor	Keith Vardy	7,845	26.99	+1.57
Liberal	Anne-Marie McBeath	6,562	22.58	−3.07
Call to Australia	Leslie Howlett	709	2.44	+2.44
Total formal votes		29,067	97.99	−0.47
Informal votes		596	2.01	+0.47
Turnout		29,663	93.18	+0.12
Two-party-preferred result
National	Tom Wallace	20,375	70.17	+1.90
Labor	Keith Vardy	8,662	29.83	+29.83
National hold		Swing	+1.90	

1985 Victorian state election: Gippsland South
Party	Candidate	Votes	%	±%
National	Tom Wallace	13,592	48.9	+16.4
Liberal	Neil McInnes	7,125	25.6	−10.3
Labor	Max Semken	7,061	25.4	−0.6
Total formal votes		27,778	98.5	
Informal votes		435	1.5	
Turnout		28,213	93.1	
Two-party-preferred result
National	Tom Wallace	19,945	71.8	+3.5
Labor	Max Semken	7,833	28.2	−3.5
Two-candidate-preferred result
National	Tom Wallace	18,960	68.3	
Liberal	Neil McInnes	8,812	31.7	
National hold		Swing		

1982 Victorian state election: Gippsland South
Party	Candidate	Votes	%	±%
Liberal	Neil McInnes	9,269	36.0	−1.4
National	Tom Wallace	8,224	32.0	+1.7
Labor	Reginald Smith	6,734	26.2	+2.7
Democrats	Wilma Western	1,492	5.8	−3.0
Total formal votes		25,719	98.2	+0.9
Informal votes		462	1.8	−0.9
Turnout		26,181	93.8	+0.9
Two-party-preferred result
National	Tom Wallace	17,836	69.3	+2.2
Labor	Reginald Smith	7,883	30.7	−2.2
Two-candidate-preferred result
National	Tom Wallace	15,068	58.6	+1.7
Liberal	Neil McInnes	10,651	41.4	−1.7
National hold		Swing	+1.7	

=== Elections in the 1970s ===
1979 Victorian state election: Gippsland South
Party	Candidate	Votes	%	±%
Liberal	David Kallady	8,998	37.4	+8.3
National	Neil McInnes	7,293	30.3	−15.2
Labor	Ronald Neal	5,660	23.5	+2.7
Democrats	Wilma Western	2,110	8.8	+8.8
Total formal votes		24,061	97.3	−0.8
Informal votes		657	2.7	+0.8
Turnout		24,718	92.9	−0.7
Two-party-preferred result
National	Neil McInnes	16,142	67.1	−9.0
Labor	Ronald Neal	7,919	32.9	+9.0
Two-candidate-preferred result
National	Neil McInnes	13,688	56.9	+5.6
Liberal	David Kallady	10,373	43.1	−5.6
National hold		Swing	+5.6	

1976 Victorian state election: Gippsland South
Party	Candidate	Votes	%	±%
National	Neil McInnes	10,611	45.5	+15.1
Liberal	David Kallady	6,797	29.1	−10.0
Labor	Russel Wilson	4,851	20.8	−2.6
Democratic Labor	Leonard Carroll	1,083	4.6	−2.5
Total formal votes		23,342	98.1	
Informal votes		439	1.9	
Turnout		23,781	93.6	
Two-candidate-preferred result
National	Neil McInnes	11,964	51.3	−1.0
Liberal	David Kallady	11,378	48.7	+1.0
National hold		Swing	−1.0	

1973 Victorian state election: Gippsland South
Party	Candidate	Votes	%	±%
Liberal	James Taylor	8,377	41.4	+14.3
Country	Neil McInnes	5,962	29.4	−8.3
Labor	Russel Wilson	4,380	21.6	−1.2
Democratic Labor	John Condon	1,527	7.5	−4.9
Total formal votes		20,246	97.9	+0.2
Informal votes		429	2.1	−0.2
Turnout		20,675	93.5	−1.0
Two-candidate-preferred result
Country	Neil McInnes	10,129	50.03	+6.4
Liberal	James Taylor	10,117	49.97	−6.4
Country gain from Liberal		Swing	+6.4	

1970 Victorian state election: Gippsland South
Party	Candidate	Votes	%	±%
Country	John Vinall	6,886	37.7	−19.6
Liberal	James Taylor	4,944	27.1	+14.8
Labor	Thomas Matthews	4,160	22.8	+4.7
Democratic Labor	John Condon	2,252	12.4	+1.3
Total formal votes		18,242	97.7	+1.1
Informal votes		437	2.3	−1.1
Turnout		18,679	94.5	+1.1
Two-party-preferred result
Liberal	James Taylor	12,904	70.7	−7.7
Labor	Thomas Matthews	5,338	29.3	+7.7
Two-candidate-preferred result
Liberal	James Taylor	10,273	56.3	+56.3
Country	John Vinall	7,969	43.7	−34.7
Liberal gain from Country		Swing	N/A	

=== Elections in the 1960s ===
1967 Victorian state election: Gippsland South
Party	Candidate	Votes	%	±%
Country	Herbert Hyland	9,716	57.3	−13.4
Labor	Derek Amos	3,075	18.1	+18.1
Liberal	Harold Suter	2,094	12.3	−2.2
Democratic Labor	Geoffrey Farrell	1,888	11.1	−3.7
Independent	John Mansfield	119	0.7	+0.7
Independent	John Routledge	69	0.4	+0.4
Total formal votes		16,961	96.6	
Informal votes		587	3.4	
Turnout		17,548	93.4	
Two-party-preferred result
Country	Herbert Hyland	13,299	78.4	+4.7
Labor	Derek Amos	3,662	21.6	+21.6
Country hold		Swing	+4.7	

1964 Victorian state election: Gippsland South
Party	Candidate	Votes	%	±%
Country	Herbert Hyland	16,090	70.4	+15.1
Democratic Labor	Geoffrey Farrell	3,492	15.3	+1.7
Liberal and Country	Peter Martin	3,275	14.3	+4.3
Total formal votes		22,857	97.7	+0.5
Informal votes		546	2.3	−0.5
Turnout		23,403	94.5	+0.1
Two-candidate-preferred result
Country	Herbert Hyland	17,728	77.6	+0.9
Democratic Labor	Geoffrey Farrell	5,129	22.4	+22.4
Country hold		Swing	−2.7	

1961 Victorian state election: Gippsland South
Party	Candidate	Votes	%	±%
Country	Herbert Hyland	11,879	55.3	−21.5
Labor	Albert Thexton	4,181	19.5	+19.5
Democratic Labor	Geoffrey Farrell	2,918	13.6	−9.6
Liberal and Country	Leslie Horsfield	2,156	10.0	+10.0
Independent	Bryan Fitzgerald	340	1.6	+1.6
Total formal votes		21,474	97.2	−0.6
Informal votes		626	2.8	+0.6
Turnout		22,100	94.4	−0.5
Two-party-preferred result
Country	Herbert Hyland	16,471	76.7	−0.1
Labor	Albert Thexton	5,003	23.3	+23.3
Country hold		Swing	N/A	

=== Elections in the 1950s ===
1958 Victorian state election: Gippsland South
Party	Candidate	Votes	%	±%
Country	Herbert Hyland	15,600	76.8	
Democratic Labor	John Hansen	4,711	23.2	
Total formal votes		20,311	97.8	
Informal votes		466	2.2	
Turnout		20,777	94.9	
Country hold		Swing		

1955 Victorian state election: Gippsland South
Party	Candidate	Votes	%	±%
Country	Herbert Hyland	unopposed		
Country hold		Swing		

1952 Victorian state election: Gippsland South
Party	Candidate	Votes	%	±%
Country	Herbert Hyland	9,899	55.1	−21.5
Labor	Sydney Crofts	8,071	44.9	+44.9
Total formal votes		17,970	99.0	−1.7
Informal votes		169	1.0	+1.7
Turnout		18,150	93.8	−1.3
Country hold		Swing	N/A	

1950 Victorian state election: Gippsland South
Party	Candidate	Votes	%	±%
Country	Herbert Hyland	11,544	76.6	+7.4
Liberal and Country	Davy Bertram	3,525	23.4	+23.4
Total formal votes		15,069	97.3	−1.9
Informal votes		410	2.7	+1.9
Turnout		15,479	95.1	0.0
Country hold		Swing	N/A	

=== Elections in the 1940s ===
1947 Victorian state election: Gippsland South
Party	Candidate	Votes	%	±%
Country	Herbert Hyland	9,648	69.2	+6.2
Labor	Percy Vagg	4,294	30.8	−6.2
Total formal votes		13,942	99.2	0.0
Informal votes		105	0.8	0.0
Turnout		14,047	95.1	+5.4
Country hold		Swing	+6.2	

1945 Victorian state election: Gippsland South
Party	Candidate	Votes	%	±%
Country	Herbert Hyland	7,788	63.0	
Labor	Cecil Shellew	4,576	37.0	
Total formal votes		12,364	99.2	
Informal votes		94	0.8	
Turnout		12,458	89.7	
Country hold		Swing		

1943 Victorian state election: Gippsland South
Party	Candidate	Votes	%	±%
Country	Herbert Hyland	9,372	83.5	−16.5
Independent	Maurice Manning	1,853	16.5	+16.5
Total formal votes		11,225	98.7	
Informal votes		148	1.3	
Turnout		11,373	87.4	
Country hold		Swing	N/A	

1940 Victorian state election: Gippsland South
Party	Candidate	Votes	%	±%
Country	Herbert Hyland	unopposed		
Country hold		Swing		

=== Elections in the 1930s ===
1937 Victorian state election: Gippsland South
Party	Candidate	Votes	%	±%
Country	Herbert Hyland	unopposed		
Country hold		Swing		

1935 Victorian state election: Gippsland South
Party	Candidate	Votes	%	±%
Country	Herbert Hyland	unopposed		
Country hold		Swing		

1932 Victorian state election: Gippsland South
Party	Candidate	Votes	%	±%
Country	Herbert Hyland	unopposed		
Country hold		Swing		

=== Elections in the 1920s ===
1929 Victorian state election: Gippsland South
Party	Candidate	Votes	%	±%
Country	Herbert Hyland	4,175	43.1	+17.6
Nationalist	Walter West	2,900	29.9	−0.5
Labor	Morris Mulcahy	2,610	27.0	+3.3
Total formal votes		9,685	98.9	+2.2
Informal votes		106	1.1	−2.2
Turnout		9,791	92.2	0.0
Two-candidate-preferred result
Country	Herbert Hyland	5,999	61.9	+61.9
Nationalist	Walter West	3,686	39.1	−9.3
Country gain from Independent		Swing	N/A	

1927 Gippsland South state by-election
Party	Candidate	Votes	%	±%
Labor	Michael Buckley	3,557	40.3	+16.6
Nationalist	Walter West	2,641	29.9	−0.5
Country	Robert Morley	1,708	19.4	+3.2
Nationalist	Thomas McGalliard	538	6.1	+6.1
Independent	George Carter	380	4.3	+4.3
Total formal votes		8,824	97.8	+1.1
Informal votes		198	2.2	−1.1
Turnout		9,022	92.0	+0.2
Two-party-preferred result
Nationalist	Walter West	4,752	53.9	+5.5
Labor	Michael Buckley	4,072	46.1	+46.1
Nationalist gain from Independent		Swing	N/A	

1927 Victorian state election: Gippsland South
Party	Candidate	Votes	%	±%
Nationalist	Walter West	2,727	30.4	
Labor	Michael Buckley	2,126	23.7	
Independent	Henry Bodman	1,821	20.3	
Country	Thomas Anderson	1,448	16.2	
Country	David White	838	9.3	
Total formal votes		8,960	96.7	
Informal votes		303	3.3	
Turnout		9,263	92.2	
Two-candidate-preferred result
Independent	Henry Bodman	4,621	51.6	
Nationalist	Walter West	4,339	48.4	
Independent gain from Nationalist		Swing		

1924 Victorian state election: Gippsland South
Party	Candidate	Votes	%	±%
Nationalist	Walter West	unopposed		
Nationalist hold		Swing		

1922 Gippsland South state by-election
Party	Candidate	Votes	%	±%
Nationalist	Walter West	2,124	39.6	−23.7
Victorian Farmers	Matthew Boland	2,017	37.6	+0.9
Ind. Nationalist	Henry York	1,223	22.8	+22.8
Total formal votes		5,364	98.2	−1.4
Informal votes		101	1.8	+1.4
Turnout		5,465	56.0	+7.3
Two-candidate-preferred result
Nationalist	Walter West	2,980	55.6	−7.7
Victorian Farmers	Matthew Boland	2,384	44.4	+7.7
Nationalist hold		Swing	−7.7	

1921 Victorian state election: Gippsland South
Party	Candidate	Votes	%	±%
Nationalist	Thomas Livingston	2,980	63.3	+5.5
Victorian Farmers	David White	1,725	36.7	−5.5
Total formal votes		4,705	99.6	+3.0
Informal votes		19	0.4	−3.0
Turnout		4,724	48.7	−10.7
Nationalist hold		Swing	+5.5	

1920 Victorian state election: Gippsland South
Party	Candidate	Votes	%	±%
Nationalist	Thomas Livingston	3,212	57.8	+3.3
Victorian Farmers	Thomas McGalliard	2,346	42.2	+22.5
Total formal votes		5,558	96.6	−0.5
Informal votes		198	3.4	+0.5
Turnout		5,756	59.4	+11.8
Nationalist hold		Swing	N/A	

=== Elections in the 1910s ===
1917 Victorian state election: Gippsland South
Party	Candidate	Votes	%	±%
Nationalist	Thomas Livingston	2,533	54.5	
Nationalist	Thomas McGalliard	1,203	25.9	
Victorian Farmers	James McQueen	915	19.7	
Total formal votes		4,651	97.1	
Informal votes		141	2.9	
Turnout		4,792	47.6	
Nationalist hold		Swing		

- Preferences were not distributed.

1914 Victorian state election: Gippsland South
Party	Candidate	Votes	%	±%
Liberal	Thomas Livingston	unopposed		
Liberal hold		Swing		

1911 Victorian state election: Gippsland South
Party	Candidate	Votes	%	±%
Liberal	Thomas Livingston	unopposed		
Liberal hold		Swing		
