= Melina Bath =

Australian politician

Melina Bath MLC

Member of the Victorian Legislative Council for Eastern Victoria Region
- Incumbent
- Assumed office 16 April 2015
- Preceded by: Danny O'Brien

Personal details
- Born: 18 December 1966 (age 59) Fish Creek, Victoria, Australia
- Party: The Nationals
- Education: University of Melbourne
- Profession: Teacher
- Website: http://www.melinabath.com.au/

Melina Gaye Bath (born 18 December 1966) is an Australian politician and former schoolteacher, who is a Nationals member of the Victorian Legislative Council representing the Eastern Victoria Region.

Bath studied a science degree and diploma of education at the University of Melbourne and was a mathematics and science teacher at Mirboo North Secondary College. Prior to teaching, she ran a health food store in Leongatha for twelve years. In March 2015, she was preselected by the National Party to replace Danny O'Brien, who had resigned his seat in the Legislative Council's Eastern Victoria Region to contest the lower house seat of Gippsland South at the 2015 Gippsland South state by-election, following the retirement of the long-standing MP, Peter Ryan.

In February 2022, Bath, along with Matthew Guy, Peter Walsh, David Davis and Gary Blackwood, were fined $100 each for breaching face mask rules, after the Coalition MPs were photographed maskless while attending an event in Parliament House.
