= Victorian National Party leadership elections =

The Victorian National Party, the state branch of the National Party of Australia in Victoria, has held a number of leadership elections and deputy leadership elections.

== 1999 election ==
1999 Victorian National Party leadership election
- 16 December 1999
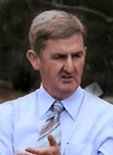
Candidate	Peter Ryan
Caucus vote	Unopposed
Leader before election
Pat McNamara
Elected Leader
Peter Ryan

The 1999 Victorian National Party leadership election was held on 16 December 1999.

Following the Labor Party's win at the Frankston East state supplementary election, which meant they would win the 1999 state election, Pat McNamara resigned as leader and from parliament, triggering a by-election in Benalla.

Peter Ryan was elected as leader unopposed, with Barry Steggall replacing Ryan as deputy leader. Following the 2000 Benalla by-election, Ryan would lead the National Party out of the Coalition with the Liberal Party, establishing the Nationals as a standalone party on the crossbench.

=== Results ===
1999 Victorian National Party leadership election
Faction	Candidate	Votes	%	±%
National	Peter Ryan	unopposed		
Total votes		10		

== 2014 election ==
2014 Victorian National Party leadership election
- 3 December 2014
Candidate	Peter Walsh
Caucus vote	Unopposed
Leader before election
Peter Ryan
Elected Leader
Peter Walsh

The 2014 Victorian National Party leadership election was held on 3 December 2014.

Following the loss of the Coalition − which had been reformed in 2008 − at the 2014 Victorian state election, Peter Ryan resigned as Nationals leader. Although he initially said he would remain in parliament, he resigned as the member for Gippsland South only three months later in February 2015, triggering a by-election.

Peter Walsh was elected unopposed as the new leader, while newly elected MP Steph Ryan was elected as deputy leader.

=== Results ===
2014 Victorian National Party leadership election
Faction	Candidate	Votes	%	±%
National	Peter Walsh	unopposed		
Total votes		10		

== 2024 election ==
2024 Victorian National Party leadership election
- 25 November 2024
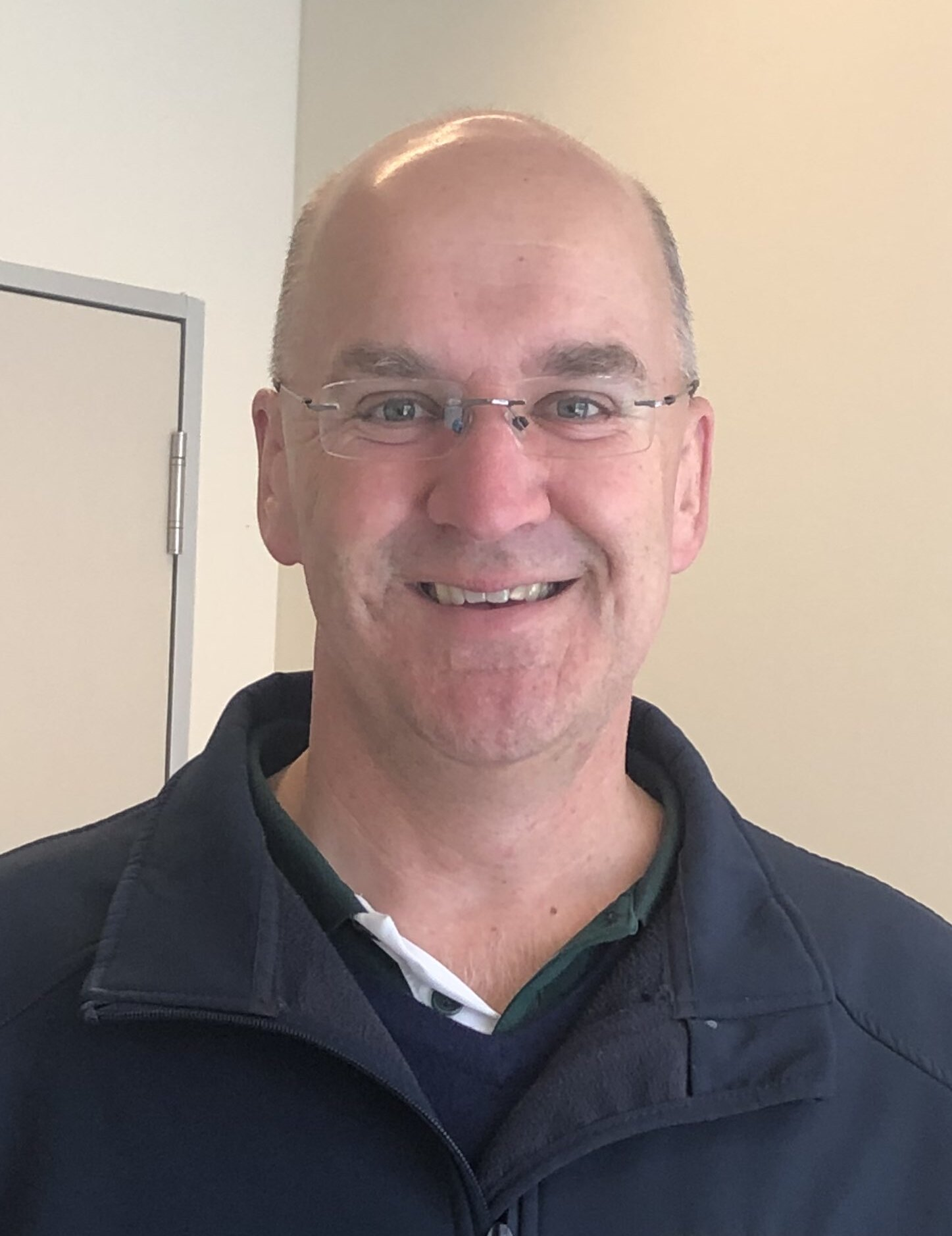
Candidate	Danny O'Brien
Caucus vote	Unopposed
Leader before election
Peter Walsh
Elected Leader
Danny O'Brien

The 2024 Victorian National Party leadership election was held on 25 November 2024.

Peter Walsh stood down from the position after 10 years, with shadow roads minister Danny O'Brien elected unopposed as his replacement and Emma Kealy remaining as deputy leader.

=== Results ===
2024 Victorian National Party leadership election
Faction	Candidate	Votes	%	±%
National	Danny O'Brien	unopposed		
Total votes		11		
