= George Macartney =

George Macartney or McCartney may refer to:

- George Macartney (British Army officer) (died 1730)
- George Macartney (1672–1757), MP for Belfast, Newton Limavady and Donegal
- George Macartney (died 1724), MP for Belfast
- George McCartney, 1st Earl McCartney (1737–1806), first British Ambassador to China
- George Hume Macartney (1793–1869), MP for Antrim
- George Macartney (British consul) (1867–1945), British consul-general in Kashgar
- George Macartney (Australian politician), member of the Victorian Legislative Assembly
- George McCartney (footballer) (born 1981), Northern Irish footballer
