= Electoral results for the district of Murray Plains =

Victoria, Australia, district election results

This is a list of electoral results for the Electoral district of Murray Plains in Victorian state elections.

== Members for Murray Plains ==
Member	Party	Term
Peter Walsh	National	2014–present

== Election results ==
=== Elections in the 2020s ===
2022 Victorian state election: Murray Plains
Party	Candidate	Votes	%	±%
National	Peter Walsh	24,831	61.78	+1.45
Labor	Damien Hurrell	7,543	18.77	−0.62
Family First	Cameron Macpherson	2,575	6.41	+6.41
Freedom	Katia Bish	1,752	4.36	+4.36
Greens	John Brownstein	1,560	3.88	−0.37
Independent	Andrea Otto	1,022	2.54	+2.54
Animal Justice	Glenys Leung	908	2.26	+2.26
Total formal votes		40,191	93.85	−0.74
Informal votes		2,635	6.15	+0.74
Turnout		42,826	88.08	−2.42
Two-party-preferred result
National	Peter Walsh	29,354	72.89	−1.06
Labor	Damien Hurrell	10,919	27.11	+1.06
National hold		Swing	−1.06	

=== Elections in the 2010s ===
2018 Victorian state election: Murray Plains
Party	Candidate	Votes	%	±%
National	Peter Walsh	24,234	60.33	−2.94
Labor	Peter Williams	7,790	19.39	−1.00
Shooters, Fishers, Farmers	Daniel Straub	6,438	16.03	+16.03
Greens	Ian Christoe	1,706	4.25	+0.22
Total formal votes		40,168	94.59	+0.08
Informal votes		2,297	5.41	−0.08
Turnout		42,465	90.50	−3.23
Two-party-preferred result
National	Peter Walsh	29,703	73.95	+1.59
Labor	Peter Williams	10,461	26.05	−1.59
National hold		Swing	+1.59	

2014 Victorian state election: Murray Plains
Party	Candidate	Votes	%	±%
National	Peter Walsh	25,406	63.3	−7.3
Labor	Peter Williams	8,190	20.4	+6.6
Country Alliance	Bryon Winn	2,978	7.4	+1.1
Greens	Ian Christoe	1,619	4.0	−0.0
Rise Up Australia	Laurie J. Wintle	1,037	2.6	+2.6
Independent	Nigel Anthony Hicks	924	2.3	+2.3
Total formal votes		40,154	94.5	−1.2
Informal votes		2,331	5.5	+1.2
Turnout		42,485	93.7	+3.0
Two-party-preferred result
National	Peter Walsh	29,100	72.4	−7.8
Labor	Peter Williams	11,111	27.6	+7.8
National hold		Swing	−7.8	
