= Tulliallan, Melbourne =

Residential community in Melbourne, Australia

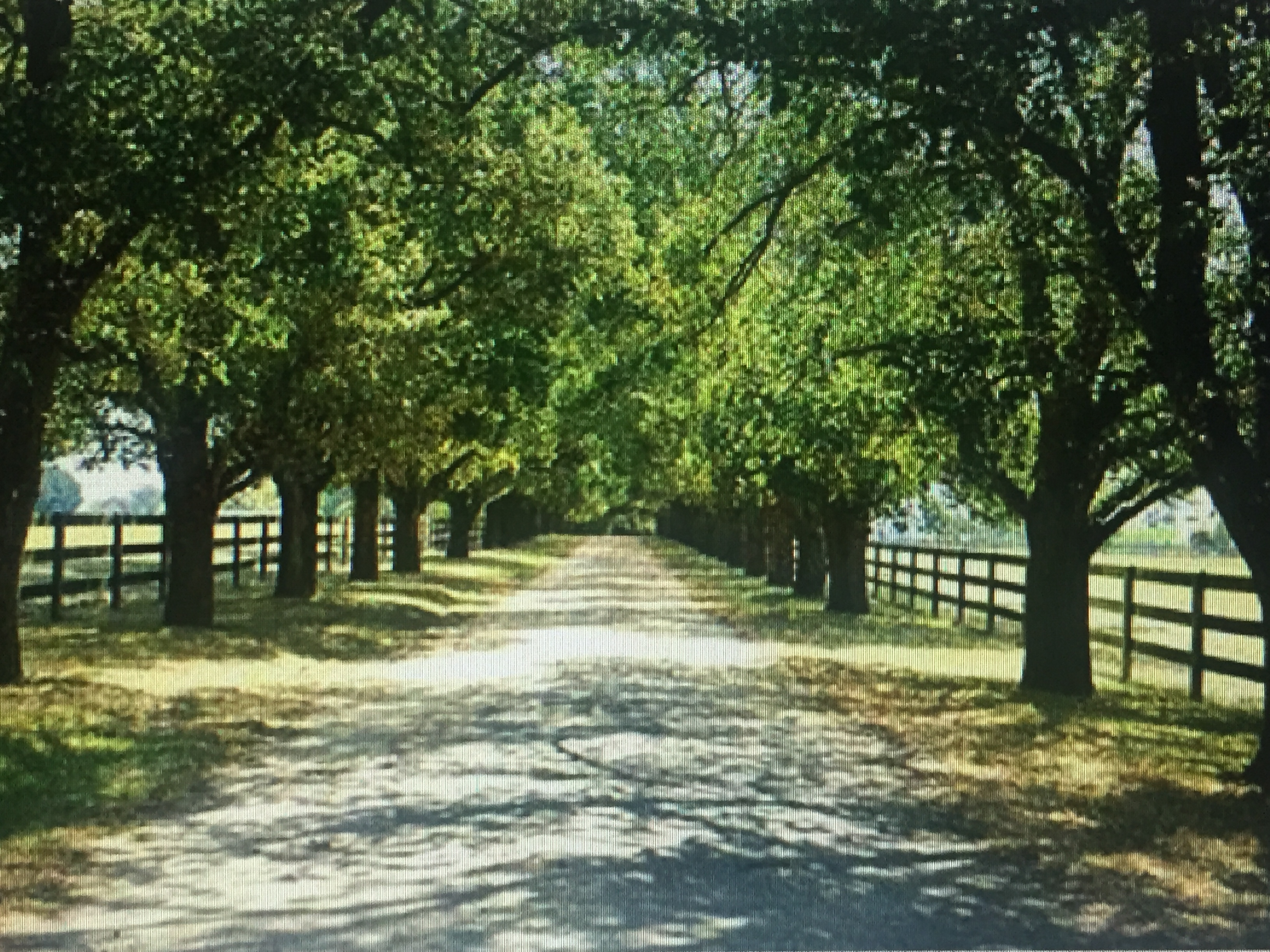
124-year old Elm trees lining the driveway to Tulliallan

Tulliallan is a residential community alongside the suburb of Berwick, Cranbourne North in Australia. The community is named after the heritage-listed ‘Tulliallan’ consisting of a stone brick "Shearers Cottage" constructed circa 1860 and an "Avenue of Elms", one of the largest private ones in the municipality. These Elm Trees are estimated to be 124 years old as of 2024 and have been generously donated by Tulliallan’s former owner Peter White.

== History ==
Since the 1840s there have been about a dozen different families who have owned this property. The Rossiter family owned the property for more than 20 years and were the first official owners. The Mitchell family also owned the land and George Mitchell came up with the name of Tulliallan, based on it being the name of his parents’ home in Williamstown. George Mitchell’s father James Mitchell was on the committee that helped to choose the design for the Australian flag. The Elder family owned the property for longer than anyone else, being more than 30 years. The Strettle family also lived on this land for more than 20 years and actually purchased additional land to expand the size of the property.

Accordingly, the names of the estate have also changed over the years as follows:

- 1840 - 1855 Garem Gam Run
- 1855 - 1880s Rossiter's Station
- 1880s - 1915 Glady's Park
- 1915 - present day Tulliallan

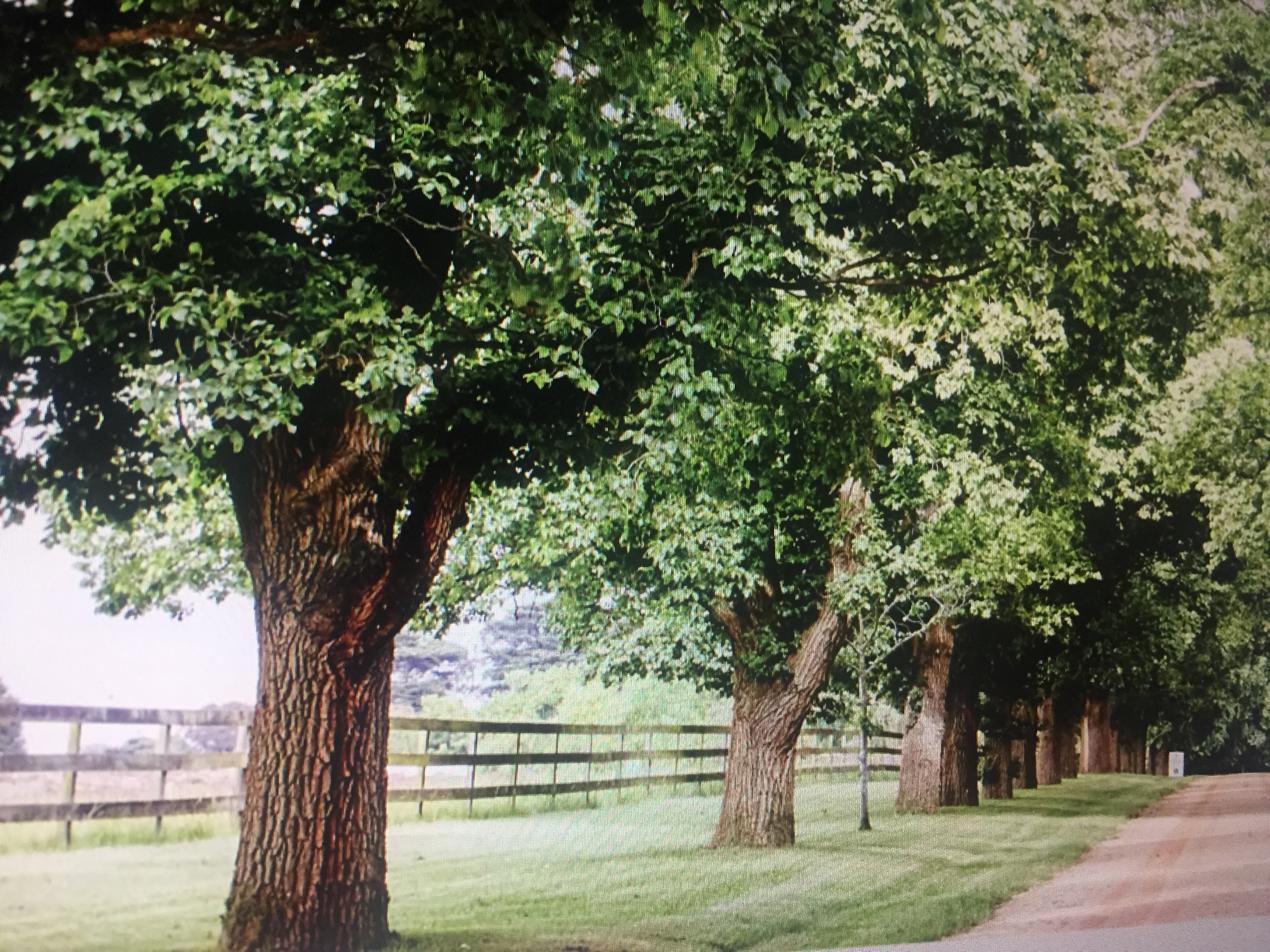
The 51 Elm trees down each side were planted in 2 stages since 1900

The historical 'Tulliallan' is a complex of farm buildings at the end of a long tree-lined driveway. Many of the buildings appear to date from the mid to late twentieth century. Buildings and structures that appear to pre-date World War Two include:

=== Brick and stone cottage ===
The cottage is located opposite the homestead entrance, facing north. It is a small single-storey structure constructed from hand-made red bricks (probably constructed on-site or locally) and sandstone both of which have been painted with a whitewash. The hipped roof is clad with corrugated galvanised steel, which is covers the early (or original) timber shingles. There is a single painted brick chimney. Doors are four-panel timber and windows are multi-pane double-hung sashes. The south elevation is an open verandah with round timber columns. The cottage is in poor condition but is being maintained. The style and nature of construction suggest that it was constructed in the mid to late nineteenth century, possibly as early as c.1860. This building is possibly the one once known as the 'shearer's cottage' and maybe the only building to survive from the pre-emptive right era of the Rossiter family.

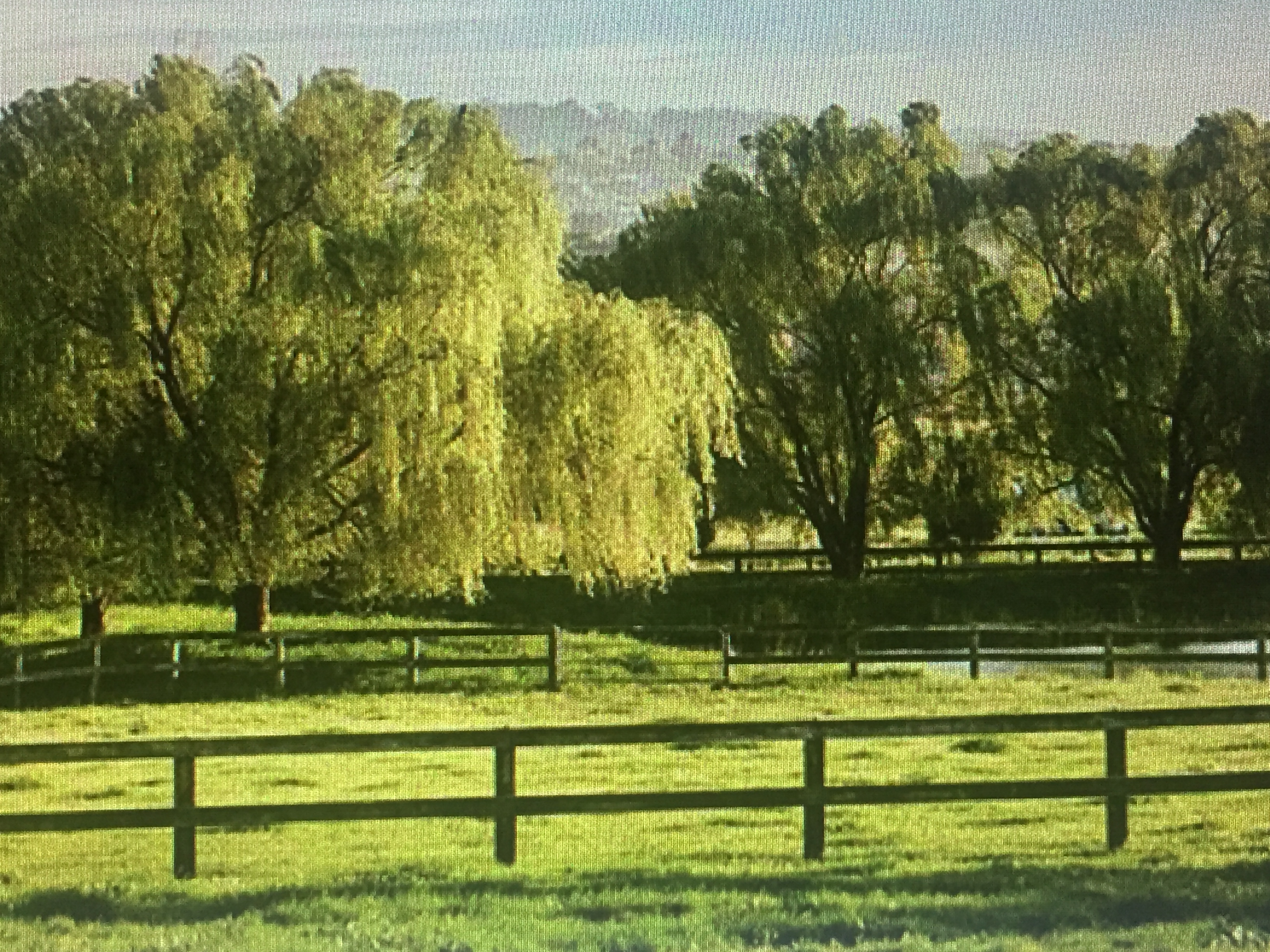
The Elms trees from a distant with Dandenong in the background

=== Outbuildings ===
The only pre-WWII outbuilding is a small timber building to the south-west of the brick cottage, adjacent to the driveway. The function of this building, which is in poor condition is unknown. A second building, an interwar dwelling (fibro house/pavilion) identified in 2004, was demolished in c. 2005 and replaced on the same site by dwelling now at the west end of the entrance driveway on the south side. Other buildings are corrugated iron-clad sheds and a brick building, all dated from the post-WWII period.

=== Avenue of elm trees ===
A key landscape element is a driveway, which is lined with an avenue of 51 Elms down each side. They are mature from the gates through to the 28th tree, and semi-mature after that indicating two stages of planting. The size of the more mature specimens suggests an original planting date of around 1900. About 10 of the trees are recent in-fill sapling plantings. Other related landscape elements are several cypresses (Cupressus Macrocarpa) which appear to have been planted in the early twentieth century as a wind-break, and there are more mature Cypress windbreaks in the surrounding paddocks. These vary in maturity and appear to date from the early to mid-twentieth century.

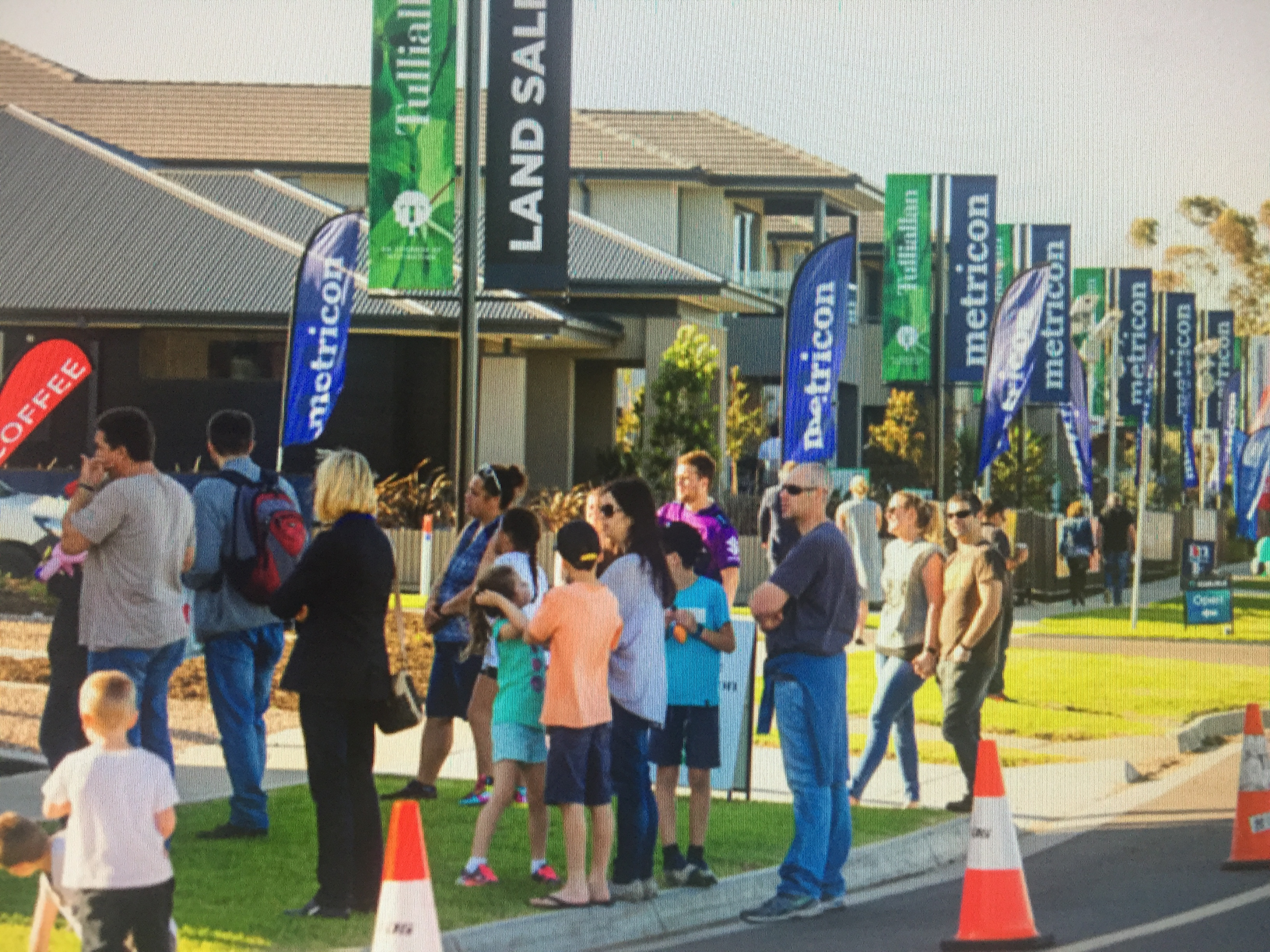
Today, Tulliallan is a new and growing residential community

== Heritage listing ==
Tulliallan was listed by the Heritage Council of Victoria as of being significant for the local historic and aesthetic significance to the City of Casey on May 12, 2004. The Heritage Council of Victoria recognises, protects and celebrates Victoria’s cultural heritage and advises the government and others on how to conserve and protect historically important objects and places for the enjoyment of current and future generations. It is an independent statutory body and provides legal protection for places and objects that are important to the history and development of Victoria.

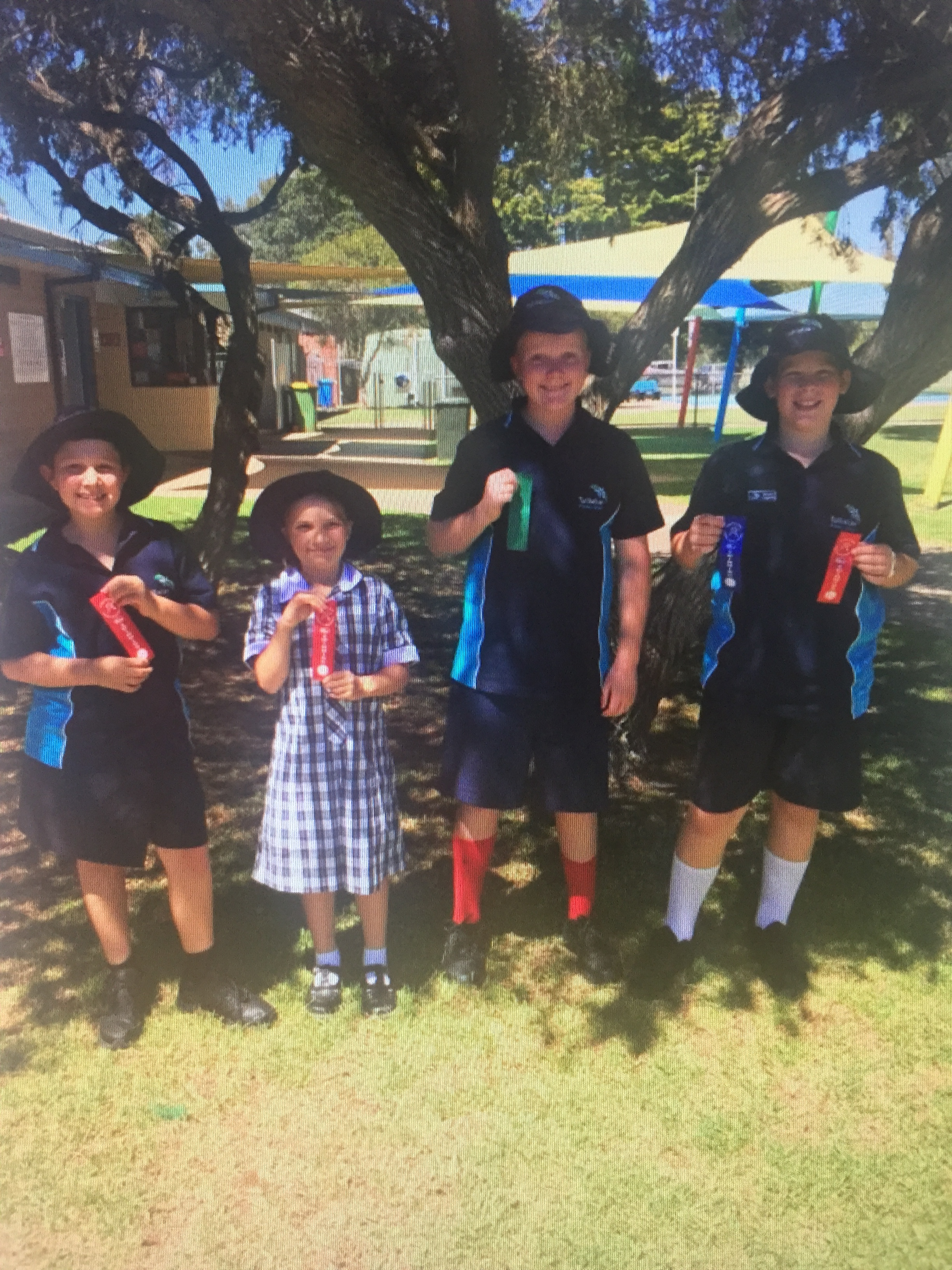
In 31st Jan 2017, Tulliallan Primary School opened its door for Prep to Year 6 students

The heritage listing in particular refers to a stone and brick cottage constructed c.1860, originally an old shearer’s cottage and an avenue of English Elms lining the entrance driveway at 1/805 Berwick Cranbourne Road, Cranbourne North. The Victorian Heritage Database lists the State's most significant heritage places, objects and historic shipwrecks protected under the Heritage Act 1995 states "The cottage is highly significant in a regional context as one of the few surviving buildings associated with the settlement of the study area during the pastoral era of 1850s and 60s prior to the land being opened for selection. It illustrates the development of cattle runs within the south east part of the Settled District of Port Philip. It has associations with locally important individuals including members of the Rossiter family, James Gibb and Captain Thomas Mitchell. The early development of the farm is also demonstrated by the now mature elm Avenue. Aesthetically, the Elm Avenue is significant as one of the largest private avenues in the municipality and provides a dramatic entry and setting for the farm complex. It also contributes to the broader cultural landscape within this area."

== Tulliallan today ==
Today Tulliallan, with its avenue of Elm trees, is a residential community developed by the RPM Real Estate Group. There were 220 residents there as of 2015. The Tulliallan Primary School opened for Prep to Year 6 starting on 31 January 2017. With the help of Heather Arnold, a Local Historian Librarian for the Casey Cardinia Libraries, year 5 and year 6 students of the school-based their House names on the previous owners of the land now occupied by the school as Rossiter Red, Mitchell Blue, Elder Yellow and Strettle Green in Mar 2017.

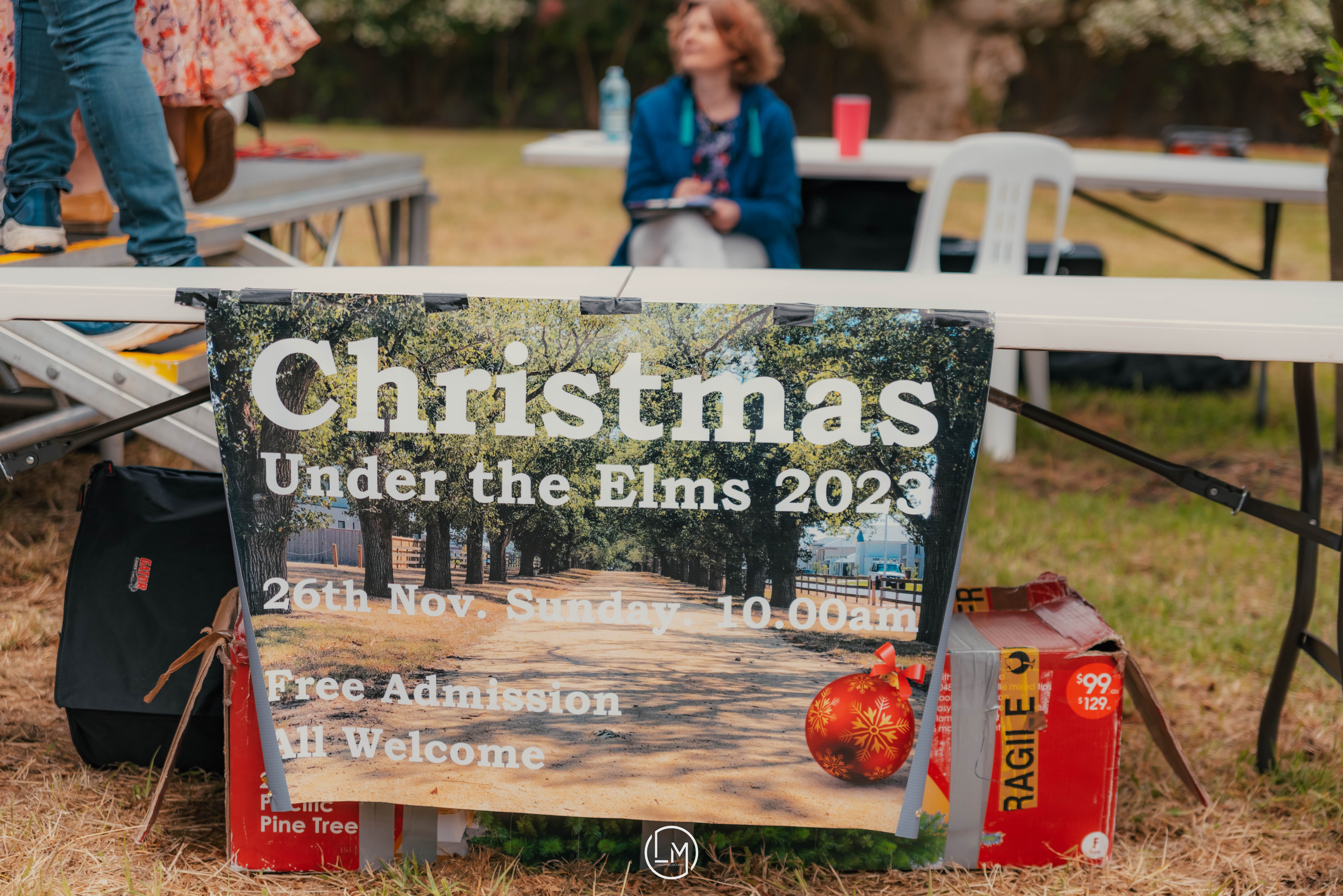
Friends of the Tulliallan Elms, Inc. a small local tree conservation association organised the first and biggest Christmas event in Tulliallan in 2023

In 2018, a small community association called the Friends of the Tulliallan Elms, Inc. was founded to support the conservation efforts of the 110 Elm trees in the area. In 2023, the Friends of the Tulliallan Elms organised the community's first and largest Christmas event called Christmas Under the Trees. The event was highly successful with vocal and dance performances, market stalls, a best dressed dog contest, free raffles and was attended by the MP for Narre Warren Gary Maas.
