= Thomas Livingston (politician) =

Australian politician

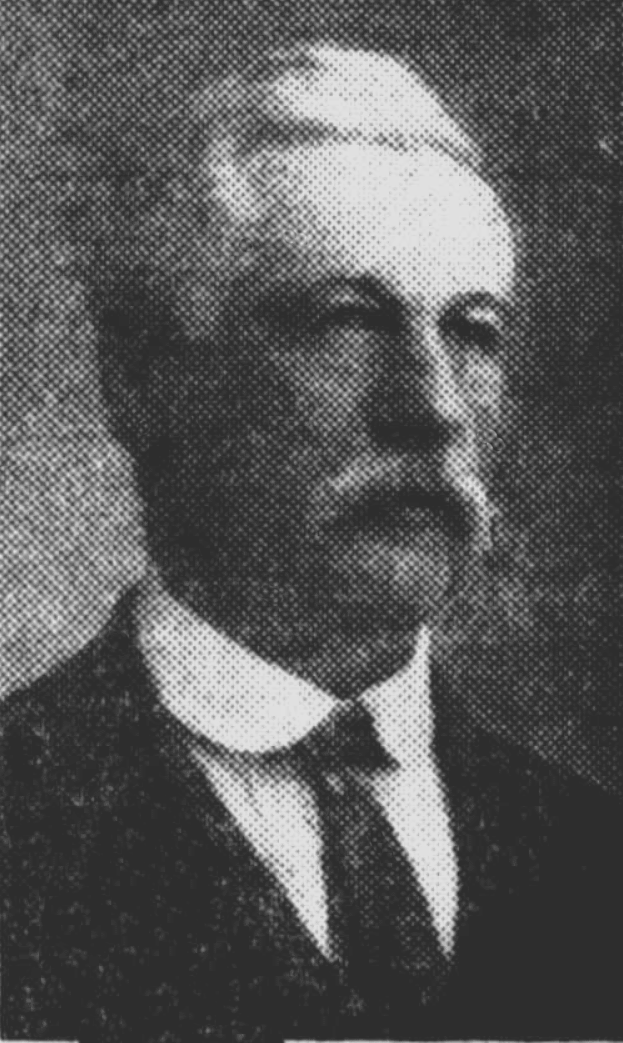

Member of the Victorian Legislative Assembly for Gippsland South
- In office 1 October 1902 – 1 July 1922
- Preceded by: Francis Mason
- Succeeded by: Walter West

Personal details
- Born: 12 June 1851 Bathurst, Victoria
- Died: 13 July 1922 (aged 71) Middle Park, New South Wales

Thomas Livingston (12 June 1851 – 13 July 1922) was an Australian politician.

== Biography ==
Livingston was born in Bathurst, New South Wales, the son of a shepherd, John Livingston. In 1856 he moved to Victoria and attended state school at Scarsdale. He became a teacher in regional Victoria from 1869 to 1883, when he began working in journalism in Shepparton. On 11 April 1882 he had married fellow schoolteacher Genefor Deborah Perry, with whom he had a daughter. He was part-owner of the Numurkah Standard and proprietor of the Tungamah Express, before becoming editor and part-owner of the Farmer's Gazette in 1887. He also founded a butter company in 1888, which eventually expanded to include cheese, poultry, rabbits and fruit. In 1900 he retired from business to take up farming on the Agnes River.

In 1902 Livingston was elected to the Victorian Legislative Assembly for Gippsland South. He voted against the Bent government in 1908, and was Liberal whip from 1909 to 1912. From 1913 to 1914 he was a minister without portfolio, and he then held the portfolios of Public Instruction from June 1914 to November 1915, Mines from 18 June 1914 to 29 November 1917 and Forests from 9 November 1915 to 29 November 1917. A key member of the Country Liberals faction in the Nationalist Party, he was again a minister without portfolio from February to June 1921.

Livingston died in Middle Park in 1922.

Victorian Legislative Assembly
Preceded by Francis Mason	Member for Gippsland South; 1902–1922	Succeeded by Walter West
