= Danny O'Brien (politician) =

Australian politician

Danny O'Brien MP
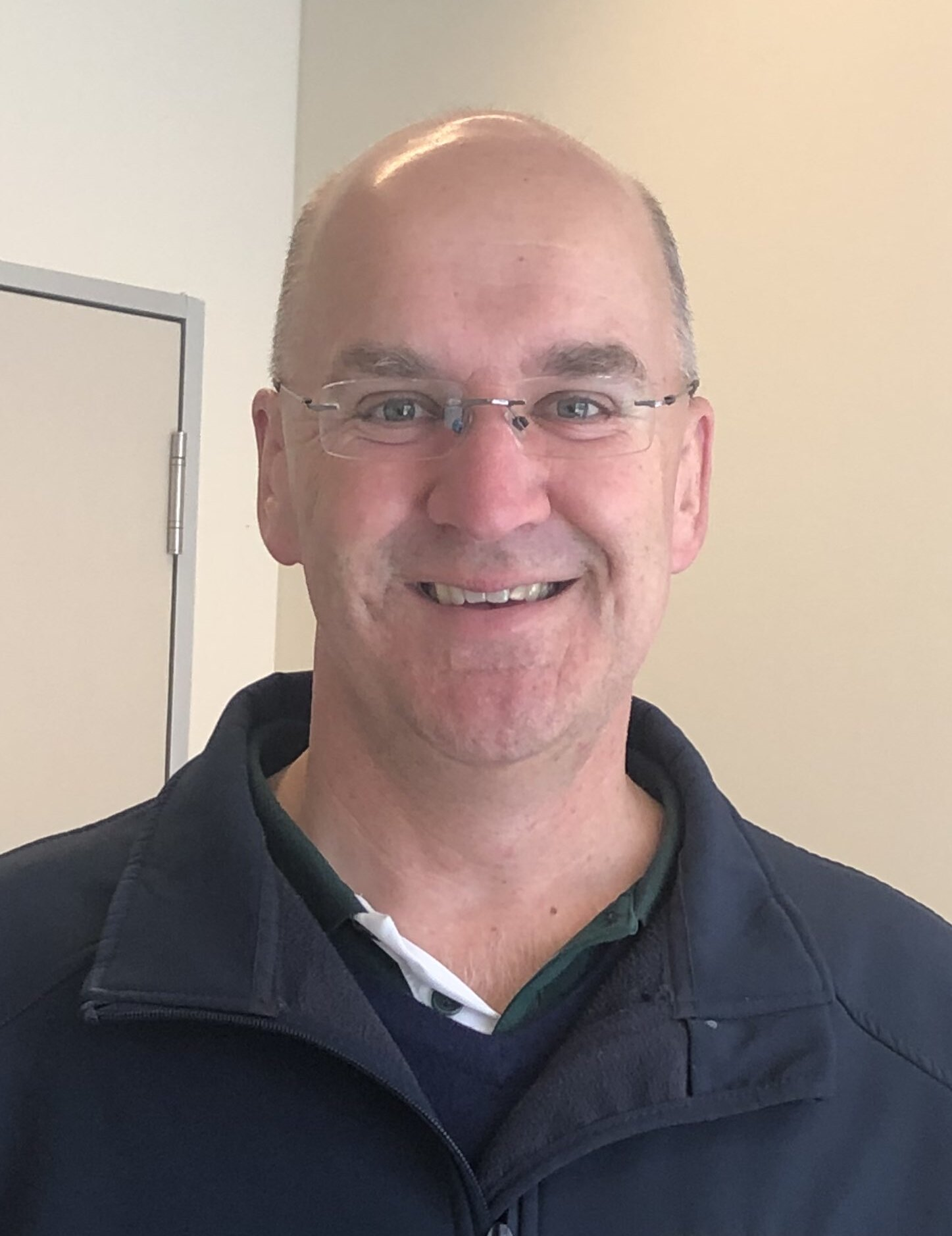
- O'Brien in July 2021

Leader of the Victorian National Party
- Incumbent
- Assumed office 25 November 2024
- Preceded by: Peter Walsh

Member of the Victorian Legislative Assembly for Gippsland South
- Incumbent
- Assumed office 14 March 2015
- Preceded by: Peter Ryan

Member of the Victorian Legislative Council for Eastern Victoria Region
- In office 26 March 2014 – 2 February 2015
- Preceded by: Peter Hall
- Succeeded by: Melina Bath

Personal details
- Born: Daniel David O'Brien; 2 April 1974 (age 51) Traralgon, Victoria, Australia
- Party: The Nationals
- Occupation: Journalist

Daniel David O'Brien (born 2 April 1974) is an Australian politician who currently serves as the member Gippsland South in the Victorian Legislative Assembly. He has been the leader of the Victorian National Party since November 2024.

== Career ==
O'Brien was born and raised in Traralgon in Victoria's Gippsland region’s Latrobe City. He began his career as a journalist, and later became chief of staff to Peter Ryan, then a senior advisor to Deputy Prime Minister Mark Vaile, and worked in the trade department of the Australian Embassy in Jakarta. He then became chief of staff to Senator Barnaby Joyce, but within six months was preselected to replace the Nationals then-member for Eastern Victoria Region, Peter Hall, who had resigned from the Victorian Legislative Council on 17 March 2014. O'Brien was appointed to replace Hall at a joint sitting of the Victorian Parliament on 26 March.

In February 2015, O'Brien sought and gained pre-selection for the lower house seat of Gippsland South, in the March 2015 by-election brought about by the resignation of Peter Ryan, who was the former Deputy Premier of Victoria. He won the by-election on 14 March.

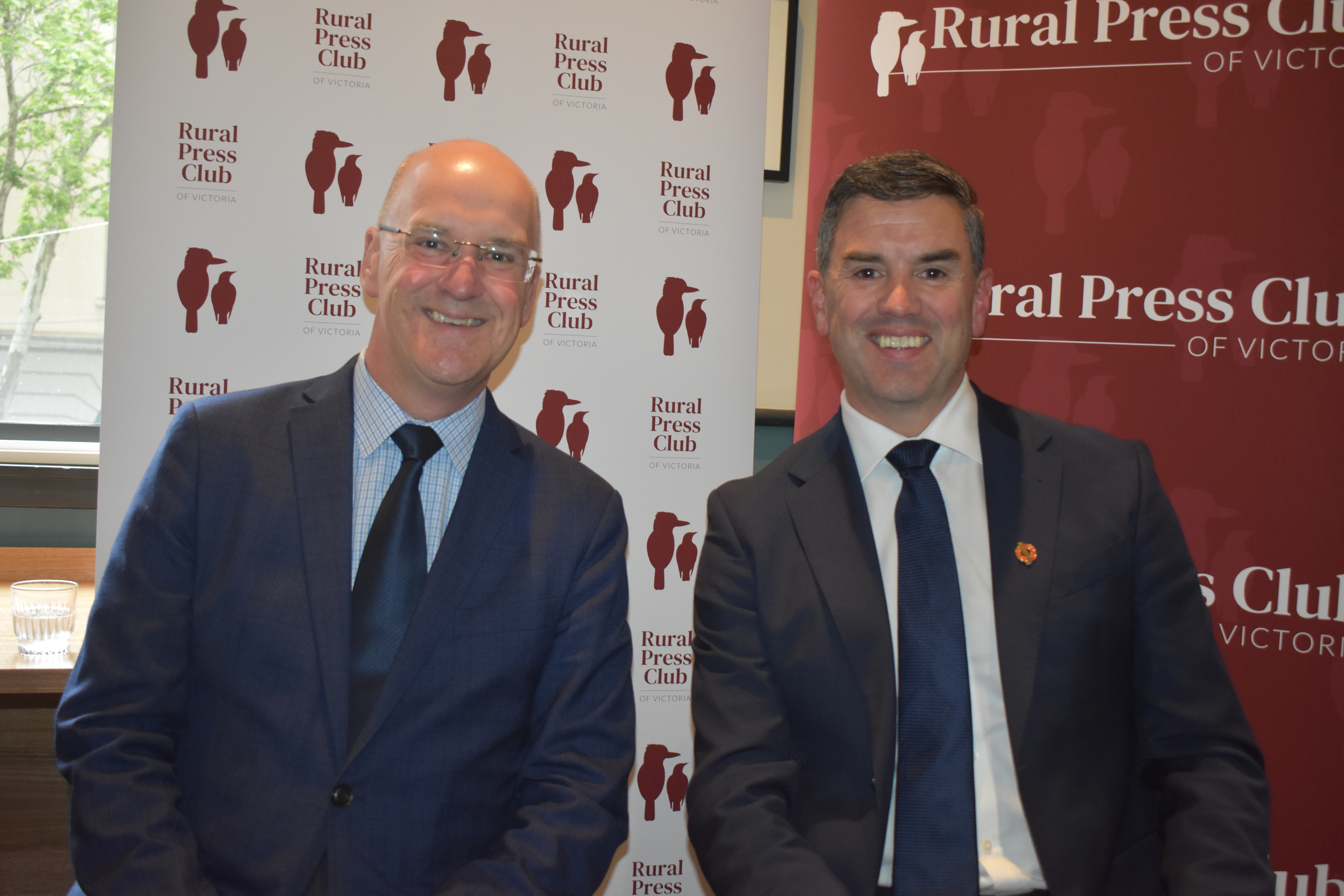
O'Brien with Victorian Liberal Party Leader Brad Battin

On 25 November 2024, Peter Walsh resigned as the leader of the Victorian National Party. O'Brien was elected unopposed as his replacement.

Victorian Legislative Assembly
Preceded by Peter Ryan	Member for Gippsland South; 2015–present	Incumbent
