= Henry Bodman =

Australian politician

Henry George Bodman
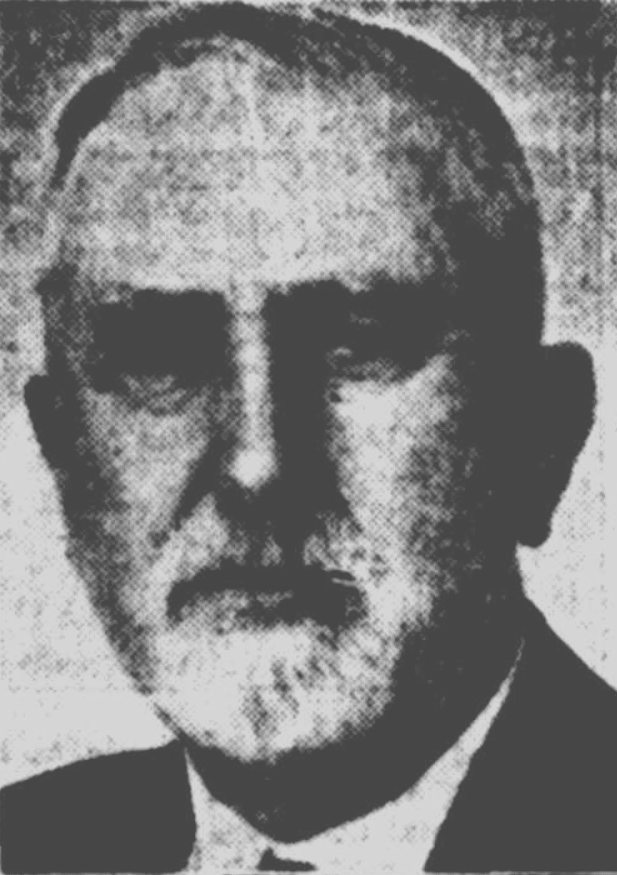

Member of the Victorian Legislative Assembly for Gippsland South
- In office 1927–1927
- Preceded by: Unknown
- Succeeded by: Unknown

Personal details
- Born: 8 February 1864 Won Wron, Victoria, Australia
- Died: 2 November 1927 (aged 63) Yarram, Victoria, Australia
- Spouse: Blanche Mabel Kate Smallman
- Children: 2
- Occupation: Politician, farmer, auctioneer

Henry George Bodman (8 February 1864 – 2 November 1927) was an Australian politician.

He was born near Won Wron to farmer Henry Bodman and Mary Ann Burnett. He became a farmer nearby, and was also an auctioneer at Bairnsdale. On 6 May 1890 he married Blanche Mabel Kate Smallman, with whom he had two children. He served on Alberton Shire Council from 1886 to 1891, 1896 to 1898 and from 1925 to 1927, with two periods as president from 1889 to 1891 and 1897 to 1898. In 1927 he was elected to the Victorian Legislative Assembly as the independent member for Gippsland South, but he died at Yarram eight months later.

Victorian Legislative Assembly
Preceded by Walter West	Member for Gippsland South; 1927	Succeeded by Walter West
