= Arthur Groom (politician) =

Australian politician (1852–1922)

The Honourable Arthur Groom
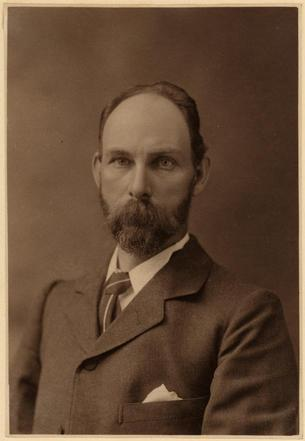

Member of the Australian Parliament for Flinders
- In office 29 March 1901 – 23 November 1903
- Preceded by: New seat
- Succeeded by: James Gibb

Member of the Victorian Legislative Assembly for Gippsland South
- In office 1886–1889
- Preceded by: Francis Mason
- Succeeded by: Francis Mason

Personal details
- Born: 26 November 1852 St Marys, Tasmania
- Died: 22 March 1922 (aged 69) Cloncurry, Queensland
- Party: Free Trade Party
- Spouse(s): 1) Gertrude Rudge; 2) Eva Rosabel
- Occupation: Stock agent

Arthur Champion Groom (26 November 1852 – 22 March 1922) was an Australian politician and land agent.

== Early life ==
Groom was born at 'Harefield' in St Marys, Van Diemen's Land, the fifth son of Francis Groom and Matilda Emma, née Minnett. He attended Horton College at Ross before arriving in Victoria in 1872. He married Gertrude Rudge, with whom he had a daughter and three sons, at Geelong on 8 January 1877, at which time he was managing a nearby station. He continued in the stock and land management business for many years.

== State politics ==
As principal of the firm Hamilton, Groom & Co., Groom became associated with the Gippsland area. He was elected to the Victorian Legislative Assembly for the seat of Gippsland South in March 1886, and transferred to Gippsland West in 1889, but lost his seat in 1892. He continued to be active in the local area; he became a member of the Railway Standing Committee in 1890 and was a member of the royal commission on the Victorian coal industry in 1889.

== Federal politics ==
Groom was elected to the seat of Flinders in the Australian House of Representatives at the inaugural federal election in 1901, representing the Free Trade Party. He was rarely present at Parliament as he continued his work as a stock agent, and retired from the House in 1903.

== Later life ==
After leaving parliament, he bought a property, Kyogle, in northern New South Wales, an extremely successful venture which turned Groom's interest further north. In 1910 he moved to Queensland, where he lived until his death on 22 March 1922 at Cloncurry. He was survived by his second wife Eva Rosabel, and their three daughters and four sons (including Arthur), together with a daughter of his first marriage.

== See also ==
- List of people with surname Groom

Parliament of Australia
New division	Member for Flinders; 1901–1903	Succeeded by James Gibb
