= Francis Mason (politician) =

Australian politician

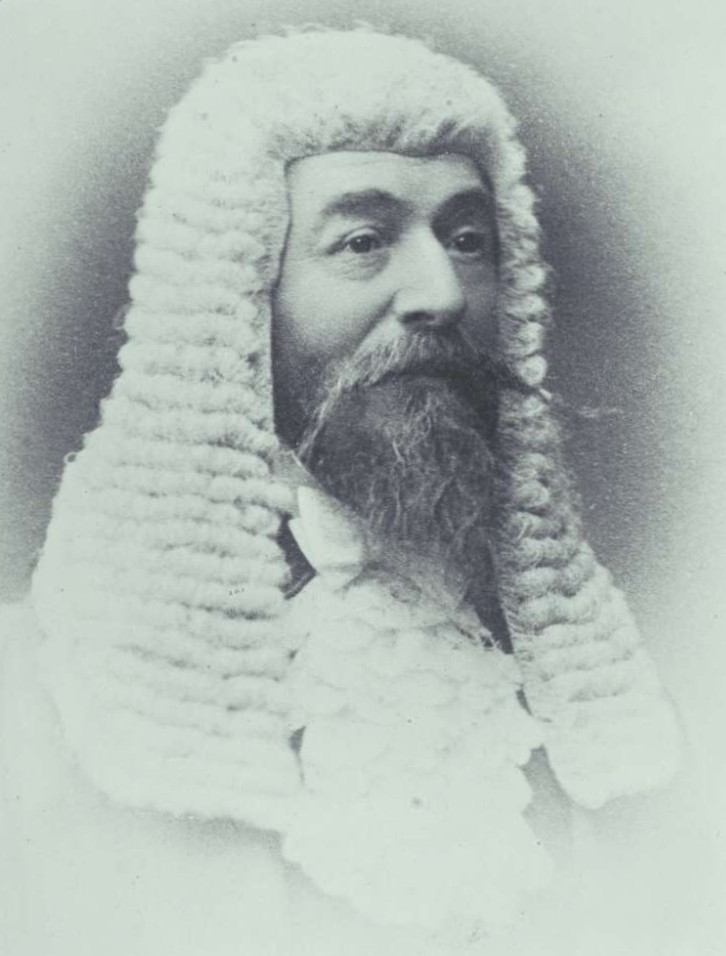
- Francis Mason at the 1898 Australasian Federal Convention.

8th Speaker of the Victorian Legislative Assembly
- In office 25 October 1897 – September 1902
- Preceded by: Graham Berry
- Succeeded by: Duncan Gillies

Member of the Victorian Legislative Assembly for South Gippsland
- In office 1871–1877
- Preceded by: George Macartney
- Succeeded by: George Macartney
- In office 1878–1886
- Preceded by: George Macartney
- Succeeded by: Arthur Groom
- In office 1889–1902
- Preceded by: Arthur Groom
- Succeeded by: Thomas Livingston

Personal details
- Born: 21 February 1843 County Fermanagh, Ireland
- Died: 19 June 1915 (aged 72) South Yarra, Victoria, Australia

Francis Conway Mason (21 February 1843 in County Fermanagh – 19 June 1915 in South Yarra) was an Australian politician of Irish descent. He was a member for South Gippsland in the Victorian Legislative Assembly between 1871 and 1902, with two interruptions. He was the Speaker of the Victorian Legislative Assembly from 1897 to 1902.

== Biography ==
Mason was born in Ireland and lived there until emigrating to Australia when he was twenty-two settling in Victoria. He was first elected to the Victorian Legislative Assembly for Gippsland South in 1871 and served for many years. While serving in the Assembly he would travel across South Gippsland on horseback accompanied by his wife to visit his constituents.

In 1892 Mason elected as Chairman of Committees for the Legislative Assembly and served in that capacity until becoming Speaker of the House in 1897. He served as Speaker until 1902 when he lost the election for Gippsland South ending his service in the Legislative Assembly. He was later described as having been the most influential member of the House at one time, and he was described as having a genial personality which made him popular with both sides of the House in addition to having a strong knowledge of Parliamentary procedure.

After his political career Mason pursued a career as a magistrate becoming Magistrate for the Dominion of New Zealand and State of Victoria and in 1907 he became Special Magistrate under the Children's Courts Act in the Hawthorn district. He worked in Hawthorn and Camberwell courts in his magistrate career and also as the chairman of several wages boards which allowed him to use his skills as Speaker of the House to mediate wage disputes between employees and companies.

In 1915 Mason suffered a brain hemorrhage at his home in South Yarra and was unconscious when a doctor arrived and died the next day. He was survived by a wife, two sons, and two daughters.

Victorian Legislative Assembly
Preceded by George Macartney	Member for South Gippsland; 1871-1877	Succeeded by George Macartney
Preceded by George Macartney	Member for South Gippsland; 1878-1886	Succeeded by Arthur Groom
Preceded by Arthur Groom	Member for South Gippsland; 1889-1902	Succeeded by Thomas Livingston
