= Neil McInnes (politician) =

Australian politician

Member of the Victorian Legislative Assembly for Gippsland South
- In office 1973–1982
- Preceded by: James Taylor
- Succeeded by: Tom Wallace

Neil Malcolm McInnes (26 August 1924 – 2 April 2005) was an Australian politician.

McInnes was born at Loy Yang to farmer Norman Willie McInnes and Christina Elizabeth Pentland. Educated at Tinamba and Maffra, he subsequently studied at Dookie Agricultural College and Melbourne University. In 1941 he enlisted in the Australian Imperial Force, and from 1943 to 1945 was a flight lieutenant in the Royal Australian Air Force. On his return he ran the family property at Tinamba and worked as a civil air pilot, being awarded the Royal Humane Society silver medal in 1947 for his role in an air rescue. He was also a company director, primarily in aviation companies, and in 1953 was the first pilot in the Citizen Air Force to break the sound barrier. It’s reported he was the first civilian pilot to break the sound barrier in 1953. The flight in an RAF Sabre Jet took place at North Luffenham in England when McInnes was a Flight Lieutenant in the City of Melbourne Squadron of the Australian Citizens Air Force. He had been selected by his unit to represent them with their sister city of London Squadron. From 1951 to 1955 he served on Maffra Shire Council. On 5 May 1956 he married Madge Jessep, with whom he had one daughter.

In 1973 McInnes was elected to the Victorian Legislative Assembly as the Country Party member for Gippsland South. In August 1980 he resigned from his party (now known as the National Party) and defected to the Liberal Party. He was defeated in 1982. McInnes died in 2005 at Sale.

Victorian Legislative Assembly
Preceded by James Taylor	Member for Gippsland South; 1973–1982	Succeeded by Tom Wallace
