= Herbert Hyland =

Australian politician

The Honourable Sir Herbert Hyland
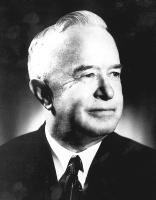

Member of the Victorian Legislative Assembly for Gippsland South
- In office 1 November 1929 – 18 March 1970
- Preceded by: Walter West
- Succeeded by: James Taylor

Personal details
- Born: Herbert John Thornhill Hyland; 15 March 1884 Prahran, Melbourne, Victoria
- Died: 18 March 1970 (aged 86) Prahran
- Resting place: Springvale Botanical Cemetery
- Party: Country Party
- Spouses: Amelia May Barratt (m. 1912–1968) Elsie Joan Mendoza (m. 1970)
- Occupation: Storekeeper and investor

Sir Herbert John Thornhill Hyland (15 March 1884 – 18 March 1970), storekeeper, investor, and politician, was born in 1884 at Prahran, Melbourne, second son of George Hyland, a Victorian-born painter, and his wife Mary, née Thornhill, from Ireland.

== Early life ==
Herbert's grandfather was John Hyland, one of the first settlers of the South Yarra and Prahran regions. The Hyland family also participated in the 1 November 1837 land sale, purchasing an allotment between Bourke St and Little Bourke st, Melbourne (after Williamstown nomination of Melbourne's first Magistrate, and were the original owners of the Freemason's Tavern, South Yarra.

Herbert attended Caulfield state school until the early deaths of his parents forced him to leave at the age of 12 and take a job in a grocery store in Glenhuntly.

Hyland eventually moved to South Gippsland, establishing his own general store and mixed grocery business. On 8 May 1912 at her parents' home at Galaquil he married with Methodist forms 18-year-old Amelia Mary Barratt (died 1968); their son and daughter were to predecease him, to his deep distress.

== Career ==
As Hyland's business flourished, he diversified into dairy farming and became a major landowner in the region. He was ruled unfit for war service, but proved a staunch advocate of soldier settlers. Elected in 1923 to the Woorayl shire council (president 1928–1929), he took an increasingly active role in community affairs, joined the Country Party and served as president of its Central Gippsland district council. His commercial ventures proved so profitable in the late 1920s that he was able to retire early and devote himself to community causes.

In 1927 Hyland unsuccessfully contested the newly created seat of Wonthaggi in the Victorian Legislative Assembly. In 1929, with the aid of preferences from the Labor Party, Hyland defeated the sitting Nationalist member for the seat of Gippsland South and entered state parliament.

Appointed minister without portfolio in the minority Country Party government of Sir Albert Dunstan in June 1936, Hyland was promoted to various ministries, both in minority Country Party and in coalition cabinets, until the election of the Cain government in 1952 brought a temporary halt to the instability of Victorian politics. Hyland's portfolios included Transport (1938–43), Chief Secretary (1943–45), State Development (1947–48 and 1950–52), Labour (1947–48), Decentralisation (1948) and Transport and Prices (1950–52).

Knighted in 1952, Hyland was elected leader of the parliamentary Country Party in 1955. In the early years of Sir Henry Bolte's Liberal government, Hyland took advantage of the premier's inexperience to extract concessions, especially relating to freight charges. Hyland often railed against Bolte for his alleged Melbourne bias. Often Hyland was given to extravagant and vituperative language. In a debate in parliament in 1958 he called Bolte a 'mongrel' and referred to another minister as 'a stupid looking goof'. He was suspended from parliament in 1960 for describing the speaker as being 'as silly as a billy goat'. Despite these outbursts, Hyland was generally liked by his colleagues.

Hyland was unexpectedly replaced as parliamentary leader of the Country Party by George Moss in 1964.

== Death ==
Sir Herbert Hyland died on 18 March 1970 at Prahran, Victoria; he was accorded a state funeral and was cremated with Anglican rites.

burial plaque of Sir Herbert Hyland referencing his grandchildren John and Joy.

== Honours ==
Numerous roadways are named after the Hyland family, including Hyland Street, South Yarra (named after John Hyland, owner of the block between Argos St, Moore St and Hyland St) and the Hyland Highway being named after Herbert.

== Personal life ==
His widow Lady Elsie, known as Joan, who was 37 years his junior (born 27 February 1921), died on 12 August 2013.

Sir Herbert Hyland and his first wife Amelia Mary Barratt are survived by their two grandchildren John and Joy Hyland, born to his first son William Herbert Hyland.

Victorian Legislative Assembly
Preceded by Walter West	Member for Gippsland South; 1929–1970	Succeeded by James Taylor
Party political offices
Preceded by John McDonald	Leader of the Country Party in Victoria; 1955–1964	Succeeded by George Moss
