= George Hedley (politician) =

Australian politician

Member of the Victorian Legislative Assembly for South Gippsland
- In office 1 January 1861 – 1 October 1862
- Preceded by: Angus McMillan
- Succeeded by: John Johnson

Personal details
- Born: 9 July 1817 Camberwell, Surrey, England
- Died: 14 March 1879 (aged 61) Sale, Victoria, Australia

George Dixon Hedley (9 July 1817 – 14 March 1879) was an English-Australian politician who served as a member of the Victorian Legislative Assembly for South Gippsland.

== Biography ==
Hedley was born in Camberwell, Surrey, England. His father was George Dixon, a merchant, and his mother was named either Isabella or Elizabeth. He studied medicine and became a Member of the Royal College of Surgeons in England in 1838. He married Anna Elizabeth Hawes Peck in Newmarket, Suffolk, in 1842. In 1846 he became an MD through the University of St. Andrews and he became a physician at Bedford Infirmary.

Hedley moved to Australia arriving in Port Phillip in February 1850 and he settled in Gippsland where he was appointed a clerk in Alberton in January 1851. He then moved to Greenhills and briefly worked as a miner before moving to Sale in 1864. He became the chief medical officer of Gippsland Hospital and also assisted with several developmental activities in both South and North Gippsland including mineral prospecting and serving as editor of the newspaper Gippsland Guardian. In 1861 he was nominated to represent South Gippsland in the Legislative Assembly of Victoria and the only other nominee resigned as they felt he was more suitable resulting in him being elected unopposed, and he held the position until resigning in 1862.

In 1872 Hedley purchased the Gippsland Times which his son inherited. He died in his residence in Sale in 1879.
