= Peter Walsh (Victorian politician) =

Australian politician

The Honourable Peter Walsh MP

Deputy Leader of the Opposition in Victoria
- In office 4 December 2014 – 25 November 2024
- Premier: Daniel Andrews; Jacinta Allan
- Leader: Matthew Guy; Michael O'Brien; John Pesutto
- Preceded by: James Merlino
- Succeeded by: Danny O'Brien

Leader of the Nationals in Victoria
- In office 3 December 2014 – 25 November 2024
- Deputy: Stephanie Ryan; Emma Kealy
- Preceded by: Peter Ryan
- Succeeded by: Danny O'Brien

Minister for Agriculture
- In office 2 December 2010 – 4 December 2014
- Premier: Ted Baillieu; Denis Napthine
- Preceded by: Joe Helper
- Succeeded by: Jaala Pulford

Member of the Victorian Legislative Assembly for Murray Plains
- Incumbent
- Assumed office 29 November 2014
- Preceded by: New seat

Member of the Victorian Legislative Assembly for Swan Hill
- In office 30 November 2002 – 29 November 2014
- Preceded by: Barry Steggall
- Succeeded by: Seat abolished

Personal details
- Born: 9 January 1954 (age 72) Boort, Victoria, Australia
- Party: Nationals (Victoria)

Peter Lindsay Walsh (born 9 January 1954) is an Australian politician. He has been a National Party member of the Victorian Legislative Assembly since 2002, representing the electorate of Swan Hill until 2014 and Murray Plains thereafter. He was state leader of the Nationals from 2014 to 2024 and served as Minister for Agriculture and Food Security and Minister for Water in the Baillieu and Napthine Coalition governments.

== Early life and career ==
Walsh was born and raised at Boort in Northern Victoria, attending Fernihurst Primary School and Boort Secondary College. He was the president of the Victorian Farmers Federation from 1998 until his election to parliament in 2002. Before entering politics, he operated an irrigated horticulture and cropping enterprise, producing tomatoes, cereals, oilseeds and legumes. He was also a director of SPC Limited, a member of the state Food Industry Advisory Council, and a board member of the National Farmers Federation.

Walsh was awarded a Centenary Medal in 2001 for "service to sustainable natural resources and as president of the Victorian Farmers Federation services to the environment." He is a keen Australian rules football fan, having served as a Boort player, committee man and selector. He was President of the Boort Football Club between 1988 and 1990. Walsh was also a member of the local Apex Club from 1982 to 1992, again including a term as President.

== Political career ==
Walsh was elected to the Legislative Assembly at the 2002 election, easily retaining the seat for the National Party after the retirement of long-serving MP Barry Steggall. He was re-elected at the 2006 and 2010 elections, receiving 79.3% of the two-party preferred vote in 2010.

In 2014, defamation proceedings were commenced against Walsh by Environment East Gippsland. Walsh entered into a confidential settlement with the environmental group, the terms of which required him to post a public apology on his official website.

In the wake of the Coalition losing government at the 2014 election, outgoing Deputy Premier Peter Ryan retired from the party leadership, declaring that it was time for generational change. Walsh emerged as the sole candidate for the leadership to succeed Ryan, and was elected unopposed. Under Walsh and Ryan the National Party has taken a more centrist stance.

The newly-elected Labor Government pursued Walsh over alleged mismanagement and interference with the Office of Living Victoria (OLV) during the four years that Walsh was Water Minister, following findings by the State Ombudsman released prior to the 2014 election that Walsh had repeatedly meddled with staffing decisions, operational management, overseen breaches of government procurement rules, and multiple undeclared conflicts of interest that saw several lucrative government contracts awarded to former National Party consultants and advisers without going to public tender. Abolishing the OLV was one of Premier Daniel Andrews' first actions upon taking office, followed by the appointment of former auditor-general Des Pearson to investigate the OLV. Pearson identified rampant management failures typified by a lack of measurable objectives, lack of proper records and due diligence or record-keeping, over 90% of funded projects failing to achieve completion by deadline, $3.6 million in taxpayer funds having gone missing, and the funding of a smartphone app which never materialised. Labor Water Minister Lisa Neville subsequently announced that she was seeking to recover a number of questionable grants made during Walsh's tenure as minister, including a $500,000 grant to colourful property spruiker Henry Kaye for the construction of an "architectural masterpiece" in Melbourne's western suburbs that never eventuated and instead remains a disused rubbish dump.

The 2018 election was a landslide victory for the Australian Labor Party under Daniel Andrews that saw the Nationals reduced to 7 seats, the lowest representation in the party's history. The party was reduced to just 1 seat in the upper house after Luke O'Sullivan lost in the Northern Victoria Region, whilst Peter Crisp lost Mildura to an independent and the party placed third and fourth place in place in its formerly safe seats of Shepparton and Morwell, respectively.

Walsh was re-elected unopposed as leader alongside Steph Ryan as deputy leader and pledged to work harder to represent regional Victoria. Following Barnaby Joyce's return to the deputy prime ministership in February 2021, Walsh emerged as a factional player in federal politics by attempting to disaffiliate the Victorian Nationals from the Federal Nationals over dissatisfaction with Joyce's opposition to a net zero carbon emissions policy. However, the Victorian Nationals management board rejected Walsh's disaffiliation motion, and the party's state council passed a contrary motion to congratulate Joyce on his return to the federal leadership.

In February 2022, Walsh, along with Matthew Guy, David Davis, Gary Blackwood and Melina Bath, were fined $100 each for breaching face mask rules, after the Coalition MPs were photographed maskless while attending an event in Parliament House. The controversy surrounding former Morwell MP Russell Northe's gambling debts dogged Walsh's leadership during this term, who declined to comment on Northe's conviction and imprisonment, despite Walsh having loaned significant sums to finance Northe's gambling addition.

In 2022, Walsh as Nationals leader, supported Treaty with Aboriginals. By 2024, Walsh as Nationals leader dropped his support for Treaty.

On Monday 25 November 2024, Walsh resigned as leader of the Nationals and was replaced as party leader by Gippsland South MP Danny O'Brien at a late night partyroom meeting. Media were informed of the change the following day, with Walsh moving to the backbench for the remainder of the parliamentary term and earning praise from Labor Treasurer Tim Pallas.

== Personal life ==
Walsh became a Freemason in 2015, joining the Swan Hill Lodge. The affiliation embroiled Walsh in controversy in March 2024 when the media outed Walsh alongside former Liberal leader Matthew Guy as Freemasons, with neither declaring their memberships on their parliamentary register of interests.

Victorian Legislative Assembly
Preceded by Barry Steggall	Member for Swan Hill; 2002–2014	District abolished
New district	Member for Murray Plains; 2014–present	Incumbent
Political offices
Preceded by Joe Helper as Minister for Agriculture	Minister for Agriculture and Food Security; 2010–2014	Succeeded by Jaala Pulford as Minister for Agriculture
Preceded by Tim Holding	Minister for Water; 2010–2014	Succeeded by Lisa Neville as Minister for Environment, Climate Change and Water
Party political offices
Preceded by Peter Ryan	Leader of the Nationals in Victoria; 2014–2024	Succeeded by Danny O'Brien
