= Walter West (politician) =

Australian politician

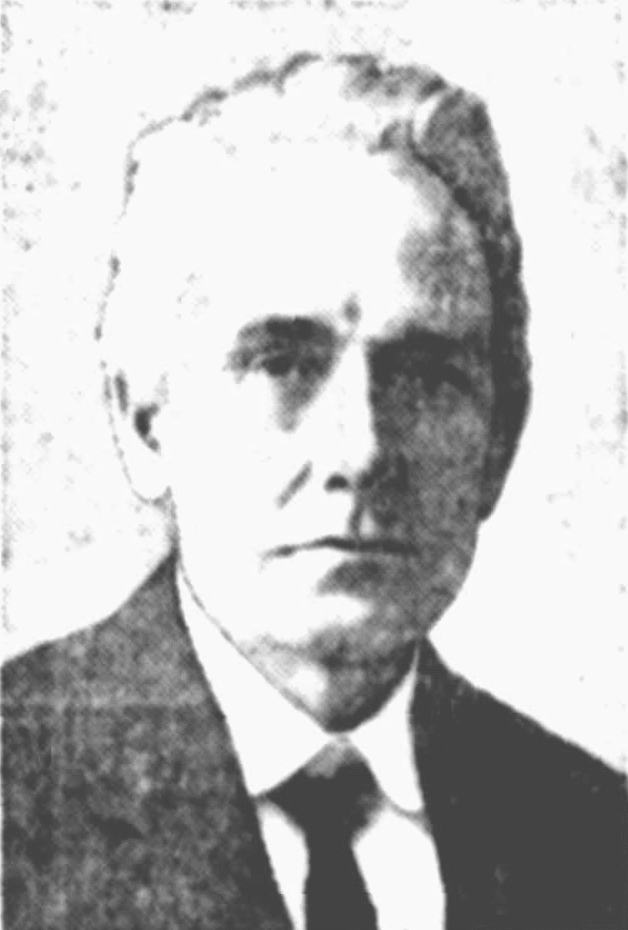

Member of the Victorian Legislative Assembly for Gippsland South
- In office 18 August 1922 – 5 March 1927
- Preceded by: Thomas Livingston
- Succeeded by: Henry Bodman
- In office 3 December 1927 – 1 November 1929
- Preceded by: Henry Bodman
- Succeeded by: Herbert Hyland

Personal details
- Born: Walter Williams West; 12 April 1861 Mortlake, Victoria
- Died: 5 September 1934 (aged 73) Traralgon, Victoria, Australia
- Party: Nationalist Party
- Spouse: Susan Agnes Barrett
- Children: Five
- Occupation: Coach builder and shire secretary

Walter Williams West (12 April 1861 – 5 September 1934) was an Australian politician. He was a Nationalist Party member of the Victorian Legislative Assembly for Gippsland South from 1922 until 1927, when he was defeated at the state election by the independent Henry Bodman. When Bodman died less than seven months later, West regained the seat at the resulting by-election, and held it until the next election, when he was defeated by the Country Party candidate, Herbert Hyland, on preferences from the Labor Party.

West was born in Mortlake, Victoria to David Venson West and Mary Blewitt, emigrant farmers from England. He moved to Traralgon in 1884 and became a blacksmith, wheelwright and coach builder. He contracted a serious illness, and being confined to bed, was unable to continue his career as a blacksmith. Inspired by the American blacksmith Elihu Burritt, West worked to "exchange the sledgehammer for the pen", and become proficient in administration and politics.

In 1907 he obtained a municipal clerk's certificate and became a long-serving secretary of the Shire of Traralgon for over 27 years. He was a founding member and president of the committee of the Traralgon Mechanics Institute, serving on the committee for over 50 years.

Victorian Legislative Assembly
Preceded by Thomas Livingston	Member for Gippsland South; 1922–1927	Succeeded by Henry Bodman
Preceded by Henry Bodman	Member for Gippsland South; 1927–1929	Succeeded by Herbert Hyland
