= James Gibb (Australian politician) =

Australian politician (1843–1919)

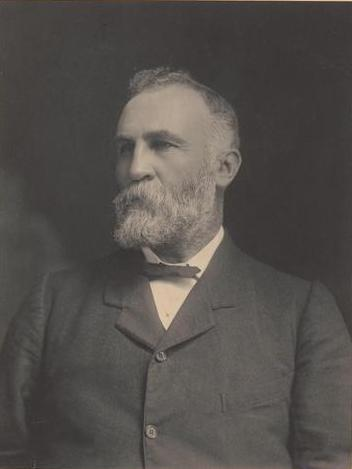

Member of the Australian Parliament for Flinders
- In office 16 December 1903 – 12 December 1906
- Preceded by: Arthur Groom
- Succeeded by: William Irvine

Personal details
- Born: 30 June 1843 Campbellfield, Victoria
- Died: 22 February 1919 (aged 75)
- Party: Free Trade Party
- Occupation: Farmer

James Gibb (30 June 1843 – 22 February 1919) was an Australian politician. Born in Campbellfield, Victoria, he was educated at Scotch College before becoming a farmer at Berwick. He was active in local politics as a member of Berwick Shire Council. In 1880, he was elected to the Victorian Legislative Assembly as the member for Mornington, and remained in the Assembly until 1886. In 1903, he was elected to the Australian House of Representatives as the Free Trade Party member for Flinders. He held the seat until 1906, when he unsuccessfully attempted to transfer to the New South Wales seat of Hume in the hope of defeating the former Protectionist Premier of New South Wales, Sir William Lyne. Gibb died in 1919.

Parliament of Australia
| Preceded by Arthur Groom | Member for Flinders; 1903–1906 | Succeeded by William Irvine |
