= James Taylor (Victorian politician) =

Australian politician

James Allister Taylor (born 2 May 1934) is a former Australian politician.

Taylor was born in Bairnsdale to hotel-keeper James McKenzie Taylor and Isobel Alison Young. Educated at Bairnsdale, Sale and Melbourne Grammar School, he was a stock salesman, and was also cycling champion of Victoria in 1952, 1957 and 1960.

On 30 May 1970, Taylor was elected to the Victorian Legislative Assembly for Gippsland South, representing the Liberal Party. He was defeated on 18 May 1973 and became a car dealer and real estate agent, before returning to parliament via the Legislative Council seat of Gippsland on 20 March 1976. He lost his seat on 2 April 1982 and returned to real estate.

From 1985 to 1989, he was a Sale city councillor. On 22 February 1963, he married Elaine Margaret Martin, with whom he had four daughters.

Victorian Legislative Assembly
Preceded by Herbert Hyland	Member for Gippsland South; 1970–1973	Succeeded by Neil McInnes
Victorian Legislative Council
Preceded by Eric Kent	Member for Gippsland; 1976–1982; Served alongside: Dick Long	Succeeded by Barry Murphy
