= Tom Wallace =

Australian politician

Member for Gippsland South
- In office 1982–1992
- Preceded by: Neil McInnes
- Succeeded by: Peter Ryan

Personal details
- Born: Thomas William Wallace; 1 March 1936 (age 89); Sale, Victoria, Australia
- Political party: National Party of Australia – Victoria
- Occupation: Politician

Thomas William Wallace (born 1 March 1936) is a former Australian politician.

Wallace was born in Sale to Harold Roy Wallace, a farmer, and Phyllis Violet. He attended Kilmany State School and Sale Technical School before becoming a grazier. He was active in the local community and in the National Party, and he was elected to Rosedale Shire Council in 1975, serving until 1982 (president 1980–81).

In 1982, Wallace was elected to the Victorian Legislative Assembly as the member for Gippsland South. While in parliament, he was the party spokesman on housing, employment and training. In 1992, he left his seat to challenge Labor MLA Keith Hamilton in Morwell, but he was defeated. From 1994 to 1997, he was commissioner of the Shire of Baw Baw.
