= Peter Ryan (politician) =

Australian politician (born 1950)

The Honourable Peter Ryan
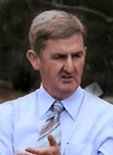
- Ryan c. 2007

27th Deputy Premier of Victoria
- In office 2 December 2010 – 4 December 2014
- Premier: Ted Baillieu; Denis Napthine
- Preceded by: Rob Hulls
- Succeeded by: James Merlino

Minister for Police
- In office 2 December 2010 – 13 March 2013
- Premier: Ted Baillieu; Denis Napthine
- Preceded by: James Merlino
- Succeeded by: Kim Wells

Member of the Victorian Parliament for Gippsland South
- In office 3 October 1992 – 2 February 2015
- Preceded by: Tom Wallace
- Succeeded by: Danny O'Brien

Personal details
- Born: 30 October 1950 (age 76) Bendigo, Victoria, Australia
- Party: The Nationals
- Profession: Lawyer

Peter Julian Ryan (born 30 October 1950) is a former Australian politician who was leader of The Nationals in Victoria from 1999 to 2014. He represented the electoral district of Gippsland South from 1992 to 2015, and from 2010 to 2014 was the Deputy Premier of Victoria as well as the Minister for Rural and Regional Development. In addition, Ryan was the Minister for Police from 2010 to 2013.

== Early years ==
Ryan was born and raised in Lockington, Victoria. He was educated in Shepparton where he graduated from high school in 1968. He went on to study Law at RMIT. Ryan moved to Sale during 1974 to work for a local law firm Warren, Graham and Murphy. He became partner in 1976 and managing partner in 1989.

== Political career ==
After an 18-year career in the law, Ryan was preselected as the National Party's candidate for Gippsland South in 1991 and elected to the Victorian Parliament as the Member for Gippsland South in 1992, replacing Tom Wallace. Ryan was a member of several parliamentary committees between 1992 and 1999.

Rural discontent led to a shock defeat for the Kennett Government in 1999, with large swings in rural and regional Victoria to the Labor Party delivering a minority Labor Government with support from three independents. Kennett left the parliament shortly after the election, and The Nationals leader Pat McNamara resigned as leader in December 1999. Ryan was elected as leader unopposed. Following the 2000 Benalla by-election, in which the Nationals lost the seat of former leader Pat McNamara, Ryan led the party out of the Coalition. The Liberals and Nationals have historically had a strained relationship in Victoria; while they are Coalition at the federal level, they sat separately for most of the second half of the 20th century in Victoria until renewing the Coalition at state level in 1990.

In February 2008 Ryan announced at a joint news conference with Baillieu that the Victorian Nationals and Liberals would join in a new coalition agreement. As part of the arrangement, Baillieu allocated five posts in his shadow cabinet to Nationals. Both parties agreed to hold joint party meetings, develop joint policies, abolish three-cornered contests (in all but very exceptional circumstances) and run joint Upper House tickets in the non-metropolitan Regions. Ryan became the Shadow Minister for Regional and Rural Development and the Shadow Minister for Manufacturing, Exports and Trade. Following the summer bushfires of 2009, Ryan was appointed Shadow Minister for Bushfire Response by the Coalition.

=== Deputy Premier of Victoria ===
Ryan contested the 2010 election as the alternative Deputy Premier, as is customary in a non-Labor Coalition. The 2010 election saw the narrow defeat of the John Brumby Labor government, and Ryan was sworn in as Deputy Premier, Minister for Police and Minister for Rural and Regional Development alongside the rest of the Baillieu government on 2 December. The Nationals at the 2010 election under Ryan's leadership won the seat of Gippsland East from an Independent, boosting the Nationals Legislative Assembly representation from 9 to 10.

In a cabinet reshuffle following the replacement of Baillieu with Denis Napthine as Premier, Ryan dropped the Police portfolio and took on the portfolio of State Development.

After the Napthine Coalition government's defeat at the 2014 state election, Ryan stepped down as leader of the Nationals in Victoria, and was succeeded by Peter Walsh. At that election, the Nationals suffered a two-seat swing in the Legislative Assembly and a one-seat swing in the Legislative Council, dropping them one seat below official status in Parliament.

On 2 February 2015, Ryan announced his resignation from parliament, which triggered a by-election in his electorate of Gippsland South.

== Personal life ==
Ryan is married to Trish and has three children.

Victorian Legislative Assembly
Preceded by Tom Wallace	Member for Gippsland South; 1992–2015	Succeeded by Danny O'Brien
Political offices
Preceded by Rob Hulls	Deputy Premier of Victoria; 2010–2014	Succeeded by James Merlino
Preceded by James Merlino	Minister for Police; 2010–2013	Succeeded by Kim Wells
Party political offices
Preceded by Pat McNamara	Leader of the National Party in Victoria; 1999–2014	Succeeded by Peter Walsh
