= George Macartney (Australian politician) =

Australian politician (1841–1878)

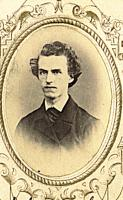

Member of the Victorian Legislative Assembly for Gippsland South
- In office 1 March 1869 – 1 January 1871
- Preceded by: Thomas McCombie
- Succeeded by: Francis Mason
- In office 1 May 1877 – 1 June 1878
- Preceded by: Francis Mason
- Succeeded by: Francis Mason

Personal details
- Born: 1841 Amagh, Ireland
- Died: 2 June 1878 (aged 36–37) Williamstown, Victoria, Australia

George David Macartney (1841 - 2 June 1878) was an Australian politician. He was a member for Gippsland South in the Victorian Legislative Assembly from 1869 to 1871 and 1877 to 1878.

== Biography ==
Macartney was born in Armagh, Ireland, and he married a woman named Anna Maria in Ireland in December 1862. He studied at Dublin University completing a Bachelor of Arts in 1863. He then moved to Ontario, Canada, where he was ordained as a deacon of the Church of England in 1864 serving for a year before moving to Melbourne, Australia, where he served as a Minister in Gippsland and joined the Gippsland Freemasons. In December 1866 he was ordained as a priest of St. James's Church in Melbourne.

In September 1868 Macartney was granted a Doctor of Laws from Dublin University making him the youngest Doctor of Laws in the colony of Victoria and the youngest of Dublin University, and he resigned from the Church that year and was admitted into the Victorian Bar in 1869. In March 1869 he was the only candidate nominated to represent South Gippsland in the Victorian Legislative Assembly upon the retirement of Thomas McCombie although it was raised that he may not be eligible to serve as he was technically still in priest's orders despite leaving the Church, nevertheless he served in the Assembly until 1871 when he moved to Fiji. While in Fiji Macartney neglected his family and his wife moved to New Zealand to stay with her brother with their three children.

Macartney returned to Melbourne from Fiji in 1872 and he settled in Albert Park and began working as a barrister and delivering lectures on temperance. He was joined by his family and they returned to Gippsland however his wife left to live with a friend due to him beating her in front of their children. In 1873 he filed for insolvency due to losses sustained in the cotton industry. He moved to Emerald Hill at some point where his wife lived with him again but he continued to behave abusively especially when drunk and his wife filed a restraining order against him.

Around June 1877 Macartney was re-elected as the member for Gippsland South and Francis Mason, who he unseated, lodged a petition arguing he was ineligible due to being a minister of the Church of England. In September 1877 his wife filed for divorce on the grounds of adultery, alleging Macartney had an affair with the families live-in governess, and ill-treatment since the year 1873.

In May 1878 Macartney became ill and he was prescribed chloral as a sleeping draught and drank an entire bottle causing an overdose and he died on 2 June 1878. An inquiry was held into his death with witnesses who knew him shortly before his death expressing that he had not seemed suicidal. He was buried in St. Kilda Cemetery.
