= 2015 Gippsland South state by-election =

- 14 March 2015
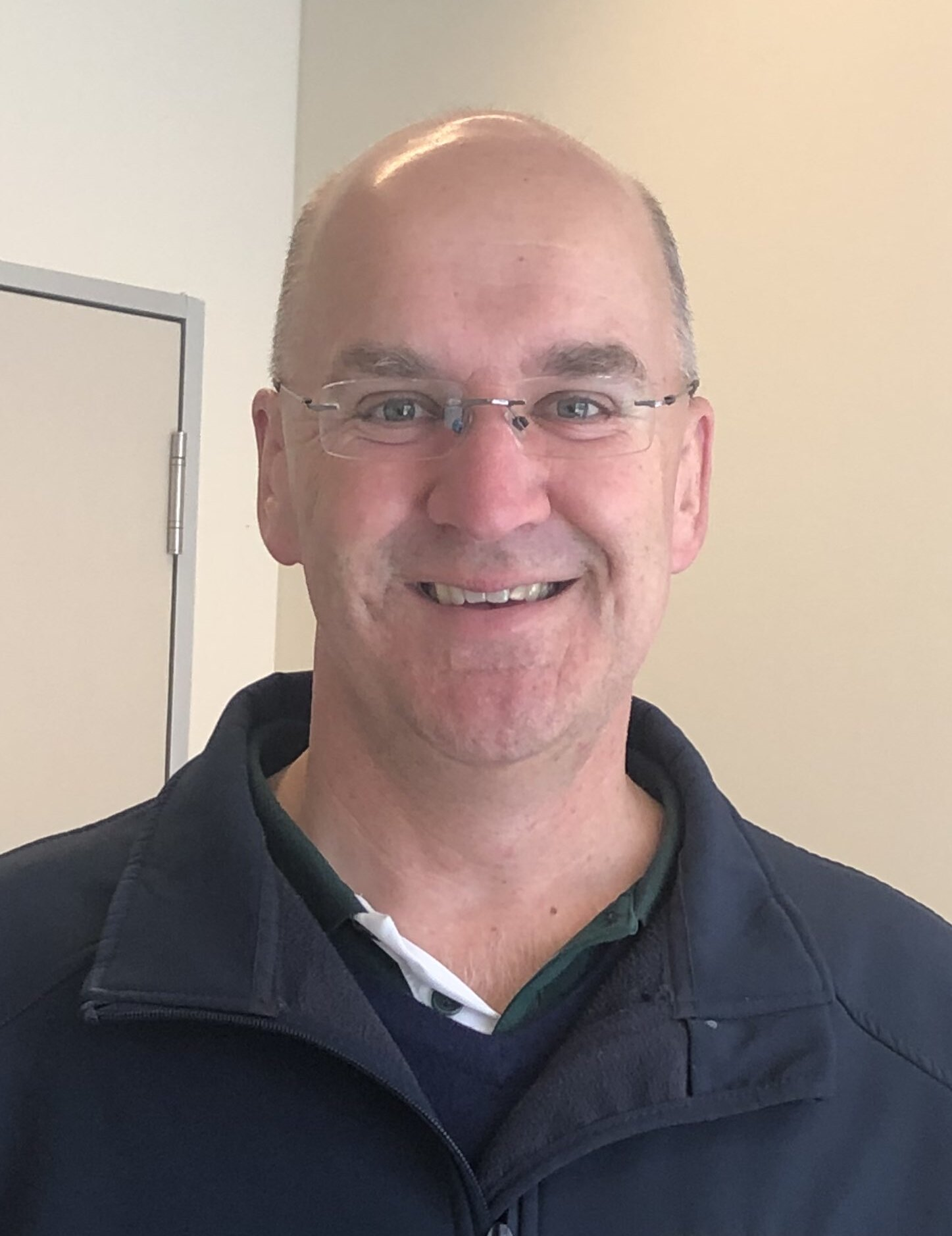

| | First party | Second party | Third party |
|---|---|---|---|
| Candidate | Danny O'Brien | Scott Rossetti | Andrea Millsom |
| Party | National | Liberal | Greens |
| Popular vote | 15,120 | 8,890 | 5,258 |
| Percentage | 45.2% | 26.6% | 15.7% |
| Swing | ▼12.0 | ▲26.6 | ▲6.1 |
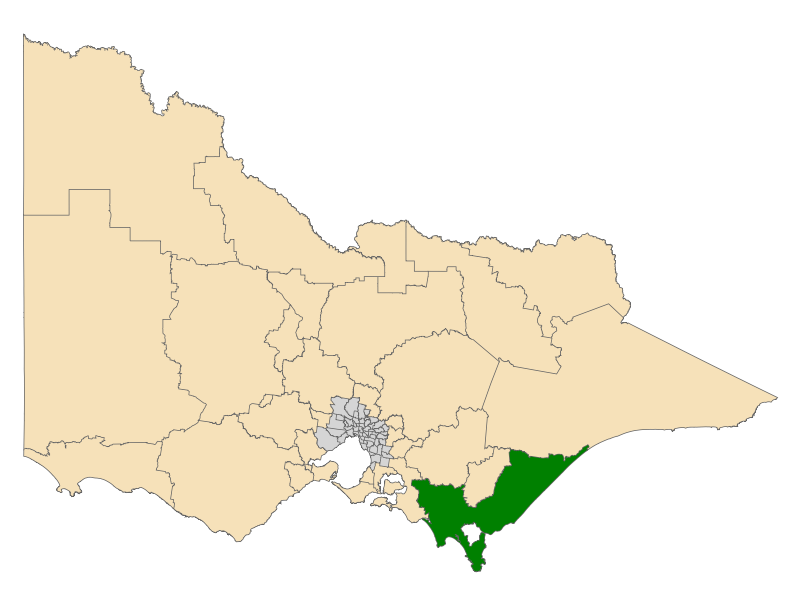
- Location of Gippsland South in Victoria
MP before election
Peter Ryan
National
Elected MP
Danny O'Brien
National

A by-election for the seat of Gippsland South in the Victorian Legislative Assembly was held on 14 March 2015. The by-election was triggered by the resignation of former state National Party leader and Deputy Premier, Peter Ryan. Ryan had been a member of the Victorian parliament for over 22 years, and last retained the seat at the 2014 election on a 65.7 percent two-party vote, with a negative 6.9 percentage point swing. The election was contested on the same boundaries used at the previous state election.

The writ for the by-election was issued on 17 February, with the rolls closing at 8pm on Tuesday 24 February. A total of 40,649 people were registered to vote in the by-election. Candidate nominations closed on 27 February. The Labor Party did not nominate a candidate, and the election was contested by both a Liberal and National candidate, a rare occurrence given that the two parties are linked in the Coalition.

The two-party preferred count was initially completed between the Nationals and the Greens, who the VEC predicted to finish first and second respectively. However, Liberal candidate Scott Rossetti polled above Green Andrea Millsom and so a further distribution of preferences was required. The Nationals won the election on the preferences of minor parties and independents, without Green or Liberal preferences being allocated.

The seat was retained by the Nationals, with Danny O'Brien winning the seat after resigning from the Victorian Legislative Council to contest the by-election.

The Greens campaigned strongly on an anti-coal seam gas platform, and encouraged voters from other parties to write "no CSG" on ballot papers to register their displeasure with the practice.

== Candidates ==
The eight nominated candidates in ballot paper order are:

Candidate nominations
| Independent | Warren Sanders | Builder based in Sale. |
| Independent | Viv Pepper | Korumburra resident, campaigned against the proposed buffer zone around the Burra Foods factory. |
| Independent | Deb Meester | Contested Gippsland South at the 2014 Victorian state election for the Australian Country Alliance. |
| National Party | Danny O'Brien | Member of the Victorian Legislative Council for Eastern Victoria Region. Former chief-of-staff to outgoing member Peter Ryan. |
| Independent | Gerard J. Donohue | Korumburra resident. Lodged a petition challenging the Victorian Electoral Commission over the validity of the election writ for the 2014 state election. A member of the United Christian Constitutional Law Group, he has previously challenged the validity of Victoria's constitution on the grounds that the 1855 Constitution Act was never repealed. |
| Liberal Democratic Party | Jim McDonald | Contested the Legislative Council Eastern Victoria Region for the Liberal Democrats at the 2014 Victorian state election. |
| Greens | Andrea Millsom | State public servant, activist, educator and volunteer. Lead Greens candidate for Eastern Victoria Region at the 2014 Victorian election. |
| Liberal Party | Scott Rossetti | Current councillor and ex Mayor of the Shire of Wellington. |

== Results ==
Gippsland South state by-election, 2015
| Party | Candidate | Votes | % | ±% |
|---|---|---|---|---|
| National | Danny O'Brien | 15,120 | 45.2 | −12.0 |
| Liberal | Scott Rossetti | 8,890 | 26.6 | +26.6 |
| Greens | Andrea Millsom | 5,258 | 15.7 | +6.1 |
| Independent | Deb Meester | 1,155 | 3.5 | +3.5 |
| Independent | Warren Sanders | 1,129 | 3.4 | +3.4 |
| Independent | Viv Pepper | 1,108 | 3.3 | +3.3 |
| Liberal Democrats | Jim McDonald | 449 | 1.3 | +1.3 |
| Independent | Gerard J. Donohue | 330 | 1.0 | +1.0 |
| Total formal votes | | 33,439 | 94.5 | −0.0 |
| Informal votes | | 1,951 | 5.5 | +0.0 |
| Turnout | | 35,390 | 87.1 | −6.9 |
After distribution of preferences
| National | Danny O'Brien | 17,040 | 51.0 | n/a |
| Liberal | Scott Rossetti | 9,528 | 28.5 | n/a |
| Greens | Andrea Millsom | 6,871 | 20.5 | n/a |
| National hold | | Swing | n/a | |
