= Electoral district of Gippsland South =

State electoral district of Victoria, Australia

Coordinates: 38°35′S 146°30′E

Gippsland South Victoria—Legislative Assembly
- Interactive map of electoral district boundaries from the 2022 state election
- State: Victoria
- Created: 1859
- MP: Danny O'Brien
- Party: National
- Namesake: South Gippsland
- Electors: 42,564 (2018)
- Area: 8,232 km^{2} (3,178.4 sq mi)
- Demographic: Rural
Electorates around Gippsland South:
Narracan	Narracan; Morwell	Gippsland East
Bass	Gippsland South	Tasman Sea
Bass Strait	Bass Strait	Bass Strait

The electoral district of Gippsland South (initially known as South Gippsland) is a Lower House electoral district of the Victorian Parliament. It is located within the Eastern Victoria Region of the Legislative Council.

Gippsland South extends along the state's coast from Venus Bay to Loch Sport and includes the country Victorian towns of Foster, Korumburra, Leongatha, Mirboo North, Port Albert, Port Welshpool, Rosedale, Sale and Yarram. The electorate includes all of South Gippsland Shire and the southern parts of Wellington Shire. Industries include agriculture, timber production and tourism. Dairying is the biggest agricultural contributor to the local economy. Wilsons Promontory National Park, Corner Inlet, and numerous lakes and islands along the coast and border are examples of natural features.

Its area was initially defined by the 1858 Electoral Act as: "Commencing at the mouth of Merryman's Creek^{[a]} on the Ninety Mile Beach; bounded on the north by Merryman's Creek to where the road from Tarraville to Rosedale crosses said creek near Bayless's pre-emptive right, thence by a line west fourteen degrees to Buneep; on the west by the counties of Evelyn and Mornington to Cape Patterson; and on the south and south-east by the sea-coast to the commencing point"

The Electoral Act Amendment Act of 1888 created new districts of Gippsland Central, Gippsland East and Gippsland West and reduced the size of Gippsland South (renaming it from South Gippsland) and Gippsland North.

It has never been won by the Labor Party, and has been in the hands of the National Party for all but two terms since 1929.

Sir Herbert Hyland held the seat for thirty years from 1929 until he died in office in 1970. He held many portfolios in government including Transport, Chief Secretary, State Development, Labour, Decentralisation and Transport and Prices. Hyland was knighted in 1952,^{[6]} and elected leader of the parliamentary Country Party in 1955.

The district is currently held by Nationals MP Danny O'Brien, who won the seat in a by-election in 2015 following the resignation of former Nationals leader Peter Ryan.

== Members for Gippsland South ==
Member	Party	Term
Angus McMillan	Unaligned	1859–1860
George Hedley	Unaligned	1861–1862
John Johnson	Unaligned	1862–1864
Peter Snodgrass	Unaligned	1864–1867
Thomas McCombie	Unaligned	1868–1869
George Macartney	Unaligned	1869–1871
Francis Mason	Unaligned	1871–1877
George Macartney	Unaligned	1877–1878
Francis Mason	Unaligned	1878–1886
Arthur Groom	Unaligned	1886–1889
Francis Mason	Unaligned	1889–1902
Thomas Livingston	Ministerialist	1902–1922
Thomas Livingston	Commonwealth Liberal	1902–1922
Thomas Livingston	Nationalist	1902–1922
Walter West	Nationalist	1922–1927
Henry Bodman	Independent	1927–1927
Walter West	Nationalist	1927–1929
Sir Herbert Hyland	Country	1929–1970
James Taylor	Liberal	1970–1973
Neil McInnes	National	1973–1982
Neil McInnes	Liberal	1973–1982
Tom Wallace	National	1982–1992
Peter Ryan	National	1992–2015
Danny O'Brien	National	2015–present

== Election results ==
2022 Victorian state election: Gippsland South
Party	Candidate	Votes	%	±%
National	Danny O'Brien	22,566	53.3	−5.3
Labor	Denise Ryan	9,920	23.4	−4.8
Greens	Jay Tiziani-Simpson	3,538	8.3	−0.9
Independent	Clay Esler	2,414	5.7	+5.7
Freedom	Angela Newnham	1,357	3.2	+3.2
Animal Justice	Helen Jeges	1,350	3.2	+3.2
Family First	Paul Furlong	1,218	2.9	+2.9
Total formal votes		42,351	94.7	+0.4
Informal votes		2,363	5.3	−0.4
Turnout		44,714	90.0	+0.7
Two-party-preferred result
National	Danny O'Brien	27,763	65.6	+1.6
Labor	Denise Ryan	14,588	34.4	−1.6
National hold		Swing	+1.6	

== Historical maps ==
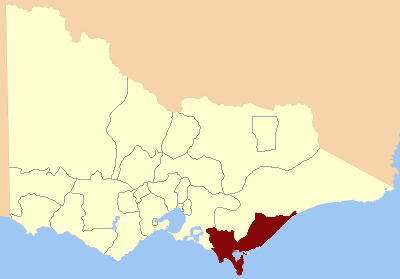
Location of Gippsland South district, circa 2010

== Notes ==
^{a} = now known as Merriman Creek
