= Electoral results for the district of Dundas (Victoria) =

Australian district election results

This is a list of electoral results for the electoral district of Dundas in Victorian state elections.

== Members for Dundas ==
| Member | Party | Term |
|---|---|---|
| Charles Griffith | | 1856–1858 |
| William Mollison | | 1858–1864 |
| George Fairbairn | | 1864–1865 |
| John Alexander MacPherson | | 1866–1878 |
| John Serjeant | | 1878–1880 |
| Charles Myles Officer | | 1880–1892 |
| Samuel Samuel | | 1892–1892 |
| John Thomson | | 1892–1900 |
| Arthur Robinson | | 1900–1902 |
| John Thomson | Anti-Socialist | 1902–1909 |
| John Thomson | Liberal | 1909–1914 |
| William Kennedy Smith | Liberal | 1914–1917 |
| William Kennedy Smith | Nationalist | 1917–1917 |
| Bill Slater | Labor | 1917–1932 |
| Athol Cooper | United Australia | 1932–1932 |
| Bill Slater | Labor | 1932–1947 |
| William McDonald | Liberal | 1947–1952 |
| Bob McClure | Labor | 1952–1955 |
| (Sir) William McDonald | Liberal | 1955–1970 |
| Edward Lewis | Labor | 1970–1973 |
| Bruce Chamberlain | Liberal | 1973–1976 |

== Election results ==
=== Elections in the 1970s ===
1973 Victorian state election: Dundas
| Party | Candidate | Votes | % | ±% |
|---|---|---|---|---|
| Labor | Edward Lewis | 7,478 | 41.3 | +7.1 |
| Liberal | Bruce Chamberlain | 6,780 | 37.4 | +7.5 |
| Country | Alexander McLennan | 2,867 | 15.8 | −4.7 |
| Democratic Labor | Patrick Healy | 1,008 | 5.6 | −2.7 |
| Total formal votes | | 18,113 | 98.0 | +1.6 |
| Informal votes | | 374 | 2.0 | −1.6 |
| Turnout | | 18,487 | 96.1 | −0.6 |
Two-party-preferred result
| Liberal | Bruce Chamberlain | 9,699 | 53.6 | +7.4 |
| Labor | Edward Lewis | 8,414 | 46.4 | −7.4 |
| Liberal gain from Labor | | Swing | +7.4 | |

1970 Victorian state election: Dundas
| Party | Candidate | Votes | % | ±% |
|---|---|---|---|---|
| Labor | Edward Lewis | 5,884 | 34.2 | −0.5 |
| Liberal | William McDonald | 5,145 | 29.9 | −3.0 |
| Country | Alexander McLennan | 3,530 | 20.5 | −2.0 |
| Democratic Labor | James Eveston | 1,424 | 8.3 | −1.7 |
| Defence of Government Schools | Alma Crouch | 1,045 | 6.1 | +6.1 |
| Independent | John Moodie | 159 | 0.9 | +0.9 |
| Total formal votes | | 17,187 | 96.4 | −1.8 |
| Informal votes | | 641 | 3.6 | +1.8 |
| Turnout | | 17,828 | 96.7 | +0.1 |
Two-party-preferred result
| Labor | Edward Lewis | 9,211 | 53.6 | +5.6 |
| Liberal | William McDonald | 7,976 | 46.4 | −5.6 |
| Labor gain from Liberal | | Swing | +5.6 | |

=== Elections in the 1960s ===
1967 Victorian state election: Dundas
| Party | Candidate | Votes | % | ±% |
|---|---|---|---|---|
| Labor | Jack Jones | 6,069 | 34.7 | +12.3 |
| Liberal | William McDonald | 5,751 | 32.9 | −4.6 |
| Country | Reginald Fogarty | 3,931 | 22.5 | −7.3 |
| Democratic Labor | James Eveston | 1,753 | 10.0 | −0.3 |
| Total formal votes | | 17,504 | 98.2 | |
| Informal votes | | 324 | 1.8 | |
| Turnout | | 17,828 | 96.6 | |
Two-party-preferred result
| Liberal | William McDonald | 9,107 | 52.0 | −15.6 |
| Labor | Jack Jones | 8,397 | 48.0 | +15.6 |
| Liberal hold | | Swing | −15.6 | |

1964 Victorian state election: Dundas
| Party | Candidate | Votes | % | ±% |
|---|---|---|---|---|
| Liberal and Country | William McDonald | 7,324 | 35.7 | −9.3 |
| Labor | Bob McClure | 7,080 | 34.5 | −6.3 |
| Country | Reginald Fogarty | 3,941 | 19.2 | +19.2 |
| Democratic Labor | James Eveston | 2,186 | 10.6 | −3.6 |
| Total formal votes | | 20,531 | 98.6 | −0.3 |
| Informal votes | | 281 | 1.4 | +0.3 |
| Turnout | | 20,812 | 96.2 | −0.2 |
Two-party-preferred result
| Liberal and Country | William McDonald | 12,096 | 58.9 | +3.6 |
| Labor | Bob McClure | 8,345 | 41.1 | −3.6 |
| Liberal and Country hold | | Swing | +3.6 | |

1961 Victorian state election: Dundas
| Party | Candidate | Votes | % | ±% |
|---|---|---|---|---|
| Liberal and Country | William McDonald | 9,344 | 45.0 | −3.7 |
| Labor | Bob McClure | 8,463 | 40.8 | +1.2 |
| Democratic Labor | James Eveston | 2,943 | 14.2 | +2.5 |
| Total formal votes | | 20,750 | 98.9 | −0.4 |
| Informal votes | | 237 | 1.1 | +0.4 |
| Turnout | | 20,987 | 96.4 | +0.2 |
Two-party-preferred result
| Liberal and Country | William McDonald | 11,484 | 55.3 | −3.1 |
| Labor | Bob McClure | 9,266 | 44.7 | +3.1 |
| Liberal and Country hold | | Swing | −3.1 | |

=== Elections in the 1950s ===
1958 Victorian state election: Dundas
| Party | Candidate | Votes | % | ±% |
|---|---|---|---|---|
| Liberal and Country | William McDonald | 10,142 | 48.7 | |
| Labor | Bob McClure | 8,261 | 39.6 | |
| Democratic Labor | John Peters | 2,439 | 11.7 | |
| Total formal votes | | 20,842 | 99.3 | |
| Informal votes | | 143 | 0.7 | |
| Turnout | | 20,985 | 96.2 | |
Two-party-preferred result
| Liberal and Country | William McDonald | 12,174 | 58.4 | |
| Labor | Bob McClure | 8,668 | 41.6 | |
| Liberal and Country hold | | Swing | | |

1955 Victorian state election: Dundas
| Party | Candidate | Votes | % | ±% |
|---|---|---|---|---|
| Labor | Bob McClure | 7,238 | 39.7 | |
| Liberal and Country | William McDonald | 7,093 | 38.9 | |
| Country | John O'Brien | 2,024 | 11.1 | |
| Labor (A-C) | John Peters | 1,895 | 10.4 | |
| Total formal votes | | 18,250 | 98.6 | |
| Informal votes | | 264 | 1.4 | |
| Turnout | | 18,514 | 96.7 | |
Two-party-preferred result
| Liberal and Country | William McDonald | 10,393 | 56.9 | |
| Labor | Bob McClure | 7,857 | 43.1 | |
| Liberal and Country gain from Labor | | Swing | | |

1952 Victorian state election: Dundas
| Party | Candidate | Votes | % | ±% |
|---|---|---|---|---|
| Labor | Bob McClure | 8,165 | 55.1 | +13.1 |
| Liberal and Country | William McDonald | 6,646 | 44.9 | −2.5 |
| Total formal votes | | 14,811 | 99.2 | 0.0 |
| Informal votes | | 123 | 0.8 | 0.0 |
| Turnout | | 14,934 | 96.9 | +0.9 |
| Labor gain from Liberal and Country | | Swing | +11.1 | |

1950 Victorian state election: Dundas
| Party | Candidate | Votes | % | ±% |
|---|---|---|---|---|
| Liberal and Country | William McDonald | 6,828 | 47.4 | −8.0 |
| Labor | Joseph Toleman | 6,039 | 42.0 | −2.6 |
| Country | Gilbert Kirsopp | 1,524 | 10.6 | +10.6 |
| Total formal votes | | 14,391 | 99.2 | −0.4 |
| Informal votes | | 112 | 0.8 | +0.4 |
| Turnout | | 14,503 | 96.0 | −0.1 |
Two-party-preferred result
| Liberal and Country | William McDonald | 8,059 | 56.0 | +0.6 |
| Labor | Joseph Toleman | 6,332 | 44.0 | −0.6 |
| Liberal and Country hold | | Swing | +0.6 | |

=== Elections in the 1940s ===
1947 Victorian state election: Dundas
| Party | Candidate | Votes | % | ±% |
|---|---|---|---|---|
| Liberal | William McDonald | 7,812 | 55.4 | +20.5 |
| Labor | Bill Slater | 6,287 | 44.6 | −20.5 |
| Total formal votes | | 14,099 | 99.6 | +0.8 |
| Informal votes | | 53 | 0.4 | −0.8 |
| Turnout | | 14,152 | 96.1 | +5.7 |
| Liberal gain from Labor | | Swing | +20.5 | |

1945 Victorian state election: Dundas
| Party | Candidate | Votes | % | ±% |
|---|---|---|---|---|
| Labor | Bill Slater | 8,022 | 65.1 | |
| Country | Arthur Carracher | 4,307 | 34.9 | |
| Total formal votes | | 12,329 | 98.8 | |
| Informal votes | | 144 | 1.2 | |
| Turnout | | 12,473 | 90.4 | |
| Labor hold | | Swing | | |

1943 Victorian state election: Dundas
| Party | Candidate | Votes | % | ±% |
|---|---|---|---|---|
| Labor | Bill Slater | unopposed | | |
| Labor hold | | Swing | | |

1940 Victorian state election: Dundas
| Party | Candidate | Votes | % | ±% |
|---|---|---|---|---|
| Labor | Bill Slater | 7,358 | 63.0 | −37.0 |
| United Australia | William Ellis | 4,319 | 37.0 | +37.0 |
| Total formal votes | | 11,677 | 99.4 | |
| Informal votes | | 70 | 0.6 | |
| Turnout | | 11,747 | 95.0 | |
| Labor hold | | Swing | N/A | |

=== Elections in the 1930s ===
1937 Victorian state election: Dundas
| Party | Candidate | Votes | % | ±% |
|---|---|---|---|---|
| Labor | Bill Slater | unopposed | | |
| Labor hold | | Swing | | |

1935 Victorian state election: Dundas
| Party | Candidate | Votes | % | ±% |
|---|---|---|---|---|
| Labor | Bill Slater | 6,462 | 58.7 | +8.6 |
| United Australia | Athol Cooper | 4,541 | 41.3 | −8.6 |
| Total formal votes | | 11,003 | 99.4 | 0.0 |
| Informal votes | | 62 | 99.4 | 0.0 |
| Turnout | | 11,065 | 95.4 | −0.5 |
| Labor hold | | Swing | +8.6 | |

1932 Victorian state election: Dundas
| Party | Candidate | Votes | % | ±% |
|---|---|---|---|---|
| Labor | Bill Slater | 5,368 | 50.1 | −7.6 |
| United Australia | Athol Cooper | 5,347 | 49.9 | +7.6 |
| Total formal votes | | 10,715 | 99.4 | +0.2 |
| Informal votes | | 69 | 0.6 | −0.2 |
| Turnout | | 10,784 | 95.9 | +0.4 |
| Labor hold | | Swing | −7.6 | |

=== Elections in the 1920s ===
1929 Victorian state election: Dundas
| Party | Candidate | Votes | % | ±% |
|---|---|---|---|---|
| Labor | Bill Slater | 5,922 | 57.7 | +0.8 |
| Nationalist | William Ellis | 4,340 | 42.3 | −0.8 |
| Total formal votes | | 10,262 | 99.2 | −0.1 |
| Informal votes | | 84 | 0.8 | +0.1 |
| Turnout | | 10,346 | 95.5 | +0.4 |
| Labor hold | | Swing | +0.8 | |

1927 Victorian state election: Dundas
| Party | Candidate | Votes | % | ±% |
|---|---|---|---|---|
| Labor | Bill Slater | 5,675 | 56.9 | |
| Nationalist | Gilbert Smith | 4,304 | 43.1 | |
| Total formal votes | | 9,979 | 99.3 | |
| Informal votes | | 73 | 0.7 | |
| Turnout | | 10,052 | 95.1 | |
| Labor hold | | Swing | | |

1924 Victorian state election: Dundas
| Party | Candidate | Votes | % | ±% |
|---|---|---|---|---|
| Labor | Bill Slater | 3,282 | 54.0 | −5.5 |
| Nationalist | Albert Borella | 2,795 | 46.0 | +5.5 |
| Total formal votes | | 6,077 | 99.8 | +0.8 |
| Informal votes | | 15 | 0.2 | −0.8 |
| Turnout | | 6,092 | 73.8 | +4.9 |
| Labor hold | | Swing | −5.5 | |

1921 Victorian state election: Dundas
| Party | Candidate | Votes | % | ±% |
|---|---|---|---|---|
| Labor | Bill Slater | 3,335 | 59.5 | −5.0 |
| Nationalist | Sidney Officer | 2,267 | 40.5 | +5.0 |
| Total formal votes | | 5,602 | 99.0 | +3.9 |
| Informal votes | | 57 | 1.0 | −3.9 |
| Turnout | | 5,659 | 68.9 | −1.5 |
| Labor hold | | Swing | −5.0 | |

1920 Victorian state election: Dundas
| Party | Candidate | Votes | % | ±% |
|---|---|---|---|---|
| Labor | Bill Slater | 3,560 | 64.5 | +17.7 |
| Victorian Farmers | William Nankervis | 1,963 | 35.5 | +35.5 |
| Total formal votes | | 5,523 | 95.1 | −1.3 |
| Informal votes | | 287 | 4.9 | +1.3 |
| Turnout | | 5,810 | 70.4 | +12.8 |
| Labor hold | | Swing | +13.8 | |

=== Elections in the 1910s ===
1917 Victorian state election: Dundas
| Party | Candidate | Votes | % | ±% |
|---|---|---|---|---|
| Labor | Bill Slater | 2,182 | 46.8 | +2.3 |
| Nationalist | William Smith | 1,668 | 35.8 | −4.7 |
| Nationalist | Edward Dobson | 813 | 17.4 | +17.4 |
| Total formal votes | | 4,663 | 96.4 | −1.9 |
| Informal votes | | 175 | 3.6 | +1.9 |
| Turnout | | 4,838 | 57.6 | −13.7 |
Two-party-preferred result
| Labor | Bill Slater | 2,364 | 50.7 | +1.1 |
| Nationalist | William Smith | 2,299 | 49.3 | −1.1 |
| Labor gain from Nationalist | | Swing | +1.1 | |

1914 Victorian state election: Dundas
| Party | Candidate | Votes | % | ±% |
|---|---|---|---|---|
| Labor | Egerton Holden | 2,740 | 44.5 | +6.7 |
| Liberal | William Smith | 2,494 | 40.5 | −19.9 |
| Independent | John Loughnane | 918 | 14.9 | +14.9 |
| Total formal votes | | 6,152 | 98.1 | −0.2 |
| Informal votes | | 122 | 1.9 | +0.2 |
| Turnout | | 6,274 | 71.3 | −1.8 |
Two-party-preferred result
| Liberal | William Smith | 3,100 | 50.4 | −10.0 |
| Labor | Egerton Holden | 3,052 | 49.6 | +10.0 |
| Liberal hold | | Swing | −10.0 | |

1911 Victorian state election: Dundas
| Party | Candidate | Votes | % | ±% |
|---|---|---|---|---|
| Liberal | John Thomson | 2,508 | 44.6 | −6.4 |
| Labor | Neil Mackinnon | 2,131 | 37.9 | −10.1 |
| Independent Liberal | Duncan McLennan | 985 | 17.5 | +17.5 |
| Total formal votes | | 5,624 | 98.3 | −1.2 |
| Informal votes | | 98 | 1.7 | +1.2 |
| Turnout | | 5,722 | 73.1 | +6.0 |
Two-party-preferred result
| Liberal | John Thomson | 3,395 | 60.4 | +8.4 |
| Labor | Neil Mackinnon | 2,229 | 39.6 | −8.4 |
| Liberal hold | | Swing | +8.4 | |
