= Results of the 1911 Victorian state election (Legislative Assembly) =

Australian state election results

Victorian state election, 16 November 1911 Legislative Assembly << 1908–1914 >>
| Enrolled voters | 711,451 | | | | |
| Votes cast | 394,189 | | Turnout | 55.41 | +21.76 |
| Informal votes | 5,364 | | Informal | 1.36 | +0.83 |
Summary of votes by party
| Party | Primary votes | % | Swing | Seats | Change |
| Liberal | 181,249 | 46.61 | +18.09 | 44 | +3 |
| Labor | 167,422 | 43.06 | +8.28 | 19 | –2 |
| Independent | 40,154 | 10.33 | +0.43 | 2 | –1 |
| Total | 388,825 | | | 65 | |

This is a list of electoral district results for the 1911 Victorian state election.

== Results by electoral district ==
=== Abbotsford ===
1911 Victorian state election: Abbotsford
| Party | Candidate | Votes | % | ±% |
|---|---|---|---|---|
| Labor | William Beazley | 5,450 | 73.6 | N/A |
| Liberal | George Martin | 1,953 | 26.4 | +26.4 |
| Total formal votes | | 7,403 | 99.3 | |
| Informal votes | | 55 | 0.7 | |
| Turnout | | 7,458 | 59.3 | |
| Labor hold | | Swing | N/A | |

=== Albert Park ===
1911 Victorian state election: Albert Park
| Party | Candidate | Votes | % | ±% |
|---|---|---|---|---|
| Labor | George Elmslie | 5,865 | 59.2 | −2.8 |
| Liberal | Ernest Joske | 3,910 | 39.5 | +1.5 |
| Independent | William Gaunson | 125 | 1.3 | +1.3 |
| Total formal votes | | 9,900 | 98.1 | −1.2 |
| Informal votes | | 194 | 1.9 | +1.2 |
| Turnout | | 10,094 | 56.0 | +2.8 |
Two-party-preferred result
| Labor | George Elmslie | | 59.8 | −2.2 |
| Liberal | Ernest Joske | | 40.2 | +2.2 |
| Labor hold | | Swing | −2.2 | |

- Two party preferred votes were estimated.

=== Allandale ===
1911 Victorian state election: Allandale
| Party | Candidate | Votes | % | ±% |
|---|---|---|---|---|
| Liberal | Alexander Peacock | 3,762 | 78.4 | N/A |
| Labor | Walter Miller | 1,035 | 21.6 | +21.6 |
| Total formal votes | | 4,627 | 98.4 | |
| Informal votes | | 79 | 1.6 | |
| Turnout | | 4,706 | 72.7 | |
| Liberal hold | | Swing | N/A | |

=== Ballarat East ===
1911 Victorian state election: Ballarat East
| Party | Candidate | Votes | % | ±% |
|---|---|---|---|---|
| Liberal | Robert McGregor | 4,377 | 60.1 | +7.6 |
| Labor | David Russell | 2,651 | 36.4 | −11.1 |
| Independent | James McNeil | 259 | 3.6 | +3.6 |
| Total formal votes | | 7,287 | 98.2 | −1.3 |
| Informal votes | | 133 | 1.8 | +1.3 |
| Turnout | | 7,420 | 71.8 | +12.3 |
Two-party-preferred result
| Liberal | Robert McGregor | | 61.9 | +9.4 |
| Labor | David Russell | | 38.1 | −9.4 |
| Liberal hold | | Swing | +9.4 | |

- Two party preferred vote was estimated.

=== Ballarat West ===
1911 Victorian state election: Ballarat West
| Party | Candidate | Votes | % | ±% |
|---|---|---|---|---|
| Liberal | Matthew Baird | 4,100 | 56.6 | +8.3 |
| Labor | Andrew McKissock | 3,146 | 43.4 | −8.3 |
| Total formal votes | | 7,246 | 99.1 | −0.7 |
| Informal votes | | 64 | 0.9 | +0.7 |
| Turnout | | 7,310 | 71.8 | +13.6 |
| Liberal gain from Labor | | Swing | +8.3 | |

=== Barwon ===
1911 Victorian state election: Barwon
| Party | Candidate | Votes | % | ±% |
|---|---|---|---|---|
| Labor | William Brownbill | 2,676 | 37.7 | +1.1 |
| Liberal | James Farrer | 2,529 | 36.5 | −3.3 |
| Independent Liberal | William Kendell | 1,831 | 25.8 | +25.8 |
| Total formal votes | | 7,099 | 98.4 | −1.0 |
| Informal votes | | 112 | 1.6 | +1.0 |
| Turnout | | 7,211 | 69.5 | +18.6 |
Two-party-preferred result
| Liberal | James Farrer | 4,326 | 60.9 | N/A |
| Labor | William Brownbill | 2,773 | 39.1 | N/A |
| Liberal hold | | Swing | N/A | |

=== Benalla ===
1911 Victorian state election: Benalla
| Party | Candidate | Votes | % | ±% |
|---|---|---|---|---|
| Liberal | John Carlisle | 3,437 | 72.8 | +11.3 |
| Labor | Gerald Stanley | 1,285 | 27.2 | +27.2 |
| Total formal votes | | 4,722 | 98.8 | −0.8 |
| Informal votes | | 57 | 1.2 | +0.8 |
| Turnout | | 4,779 | 62.1 | +17.4 |
| Liberal hold | | Swing | N/A | |

=== Benambra ===
1911 Victorian state election: Benambra
| Party | Candidate | Votes | % | ±% |
|---|---|---|---|---|
| Liberal | Albert Craven | 2,790 | 62.1 | +3.2 |
| Labor | Abraham Wright | 1,699 | 37.8 | −3.2 |
| Total formal votes | | 4,489 | 98.2 | −1.4 |
| Informal votes | | 82 | 1.8 | +1.4 |
| Turnout | | 4,571 | 69.1 | +12.3 |
| Liberal hold | | Swing | +3.2 | |

=== Bendigo East ===
1911 Victorian state election: Bendigo East
| Party | Candidate | Votes | % | ±% |
|---|---|---|---|---|
| Labor | Alfred Hampson | 3,380 | 59.2 | +4.1 |
| Liberal | Luke Murphy | 1,475 | 25.8 | −19.1 |
| Independent Liberal | George Knight | 850 | 14.9 | +14.9 |
| Total formal votes | | 5,705 | 98.4 | −1.2 |
| Informal votes | | 95 | 1.6 | +1.2 |
| Turnout | | 5,800 | 61.5 | +5.6 |
Two-party-preferred result
| Labor | Alfred Hampson | | 60.7 | +5.6 |
| Liberal | Luke Murphy | | 39.3 | −5.6 |
| Labor hold | | Swing | +5.6 | |

- Two party preferred vote was estimated.

=== Bendigo West ===
1911 Victorian state election: Bendigo West
| Party | Candidate | Votes | % | ±% |
|---|---|---|---|---|
| Labor | David Smith | 3,405 | 51.3 | N/A |
| Liberal | David Andrew | 3,226 | 48.7 | +48.7 |
| Total formal votes | | 6,631 | 99.2 | |
| Informal votes | | 53 | 0.8 | |
| Turnout | | 6,684 | 64.9 | |
| Labor hold | | Swing | N/A | |

=== Boroondara ===
1911 Victorian state election: Boroondara
| Party | Candidate | Votes | % | ±% |
|---|---|---|---|---|
| Liberal | Frank Madden | 6,096 | 60.4 | +10.2 |
| Independent Liberal | Harold Wilkinson | 3,993 | 39.6 | +39.6 |
| Total formal votes | | 10,089 | 99.4 | −0.2 |
| Informal votes | | 60 | 0.6 | +0.2 |
| Turnout | | 10,149 | 52.2 | +10.2 |
| Liberal hold | | Swing | N/A | |

=== Borung ===
1911 Victorian state election: Borung
| Party | Candidate | Votes | % | ±% |
|---|---|---|---|---|
| Liberal | William Hutchinson | unopposed | | |
| Liberal hold | | Swing | | |

=== Brighton ===
1911 Victorian state election: Brighton
| Party | Candidate | Votes | % | ±% |
|---|---|---|---|---|
| Liberal | Oswald Snowball | unopposed | | |
| Liberal hold | | Swing | | |

=== Brunswick ===
1911 Victorian state election: Brunswick
| Party | Candidate | Votes | % | ±% |
|---|---|---|---|---|
| Labor | James Jewell | 6,199 | 61.9 | N/A |
| Liberal | David Phillips | 3,809 | 38.1 | +38.1 |
| Total formal votes | | 10,008 | 98.9 | |
| Informal votes | | 106 | 1.1 | |
| Turnout | | 10,114 | 58.2 | |
| Labor hold | | Swing | N/A | |

=== Bulla ===
1911 Victorian state election: Bulla
| Party | Candidate | Votes | % | ±% |
|---|---|---|---|---|
| Liberal | Andrew Robertson | 3,527 | 61.3 | N/A |
| Labor | Andrew Davidson | 2,222 | 38.7 | +38.7 |
| Total formal votes | | 5,749 | 98.4 | |
| Informal votes | | 92 | 1.6 | |
| Turnout | | 5,841 | 61.4 | |
| Liberal hold | | Swing | N/A | |

=== Carlton ===
1911 Victorian state election: Carlton
| Party | Candidate | Votes | % | ±% |
|---|---|---|---|---|
| Labor | Robert Solly | 4,735 | 71.7 | N/A |
| Liberal | John Gardiner | 1,866 | 28.3 | +28.3 |
| Total formal votes | | 6,601 | 98.6 | |
| Informal votes | | 91 | 1.4 | |
| Turnout | | 6,692 | 54.5 | |
| Labor hold | | Swing | N/A | |

=== Castlemaine and Maldon ===
1911 Victorian state election: Castlemaine and Maldon
| Party | Candidate | Votes | % | ±% |
|---|---|---|---|---|
| Liberal | Harry Lawson | 3,397 | 61.5 | N/A |
| Labor | Luke Clough | 2,125 | 38.5 | +38.5 |
| Total formal votes | | 5,522 | 99.3 | |
| Informal votes | | 42 | 0.7 | |
| Turnout | | 5,564 | 77.6 | |
| Liberal hold | | Swing | N/A | |

=== Collingwood ===
1911 Victorian state election: Collingwood
| Party | Candidate | Votes | % | ±% |
|---|---|---|---|---|
| Labor | Martin Hannah | 5,227 | 66.5 | +25.3 |
| Liberal | Stanley Lewis | 2,632 | 33.5 | +10.4 |
| Total formal votes | | 7,859 | 98.5 | −1.1 |
| Informal votes | | 120 | 1.5 | +1.1 |
| Turnout | | 7,979 | 59.6 | −5.7 |
| Labor hold | | Swing | N/A | |

=== Dalhousie ===
1911 Victorian state election: Dalhousie
| Party | Candidate | Votes | % | ±% |
|---|---|---|---|---|
| Liberal | Reginald Argyle | 3,010 | 51.3 | +0.9 |
| Independent | John Duffy | 1,615 | 27.5 | −22.1 |
| Labor | Richard Taafe | 1,239 | 21.1 | +21.1 |
| Total formal votes | | 5,864 | 98.7 | –0.6 |
| Informal votes | | 75 | 1.3 | +0.6 |
| Turnout | | 5,939 | 77.7 | +1.9 |
| Liberal hold | | Swing | N/A | |

- Preferences were not distributed.

=== Dandenong ===
1911 Victorian state election: Dandenong
| Party | Candidate | Votes | % | ±% |
|---|---|---|---|---|
| Liberal | William Keast | unopposed | | |
| Liberal hold | | Swing | | |

=== Daylesford ===
1911 Victorian state election: Daylesford
| Party | Candidate | Votes | % | ±% |
|---|---|---|---|---|
| Liberal | Donald McLeod | 3,102 | 54.1 | +5.6 |
| Labor | John Hannan | 2,637 | 45.9 | +16.6 |
| Total formal votes | | 5,739 | 98.9 | −0.5 |
| Informal votes | | 65 | 1.1 | +0.5 |
| Turnout | | 5,804 | 78.4 | +14.3 |
| Liberal hold | | Swing | N/A | |

=== Dundas ===
1911 Victorian state election: Dundas
| Party | Candidate | Votes | % | ±% |
|---|---|---|---|---|
| Liberal | John Thomson | 2,508 | 44.6 | −6.4 |
| Labor | Neil Mackinnon | 2,131 | 37.9 | −10.1 |
| Independent Liberal | Duncan McLennan | 985 | 17.5 | +17.5 |
| Total formal votes | | 5,624 | 98.3 | −1.2 |
| Informal votes | | 98 | 1.7 | +1.2 |
| Turnout | | 5,722 | 73.1 | +6.0 |
Two-party-preferred result
| Liberal | John Thomson | 3,395 | 60.4 | +8.4 |
| Labor | Neil Mackinnon | 2,229 | 39.6 | −8.4 |
| Liberal hold | | Swing | +8.4 | |

=== Eaglehawk ===
1911 Victorian state election: Eaglehawk
| Party | Candidate | Votes | % | ±% |
|---|---|---|---|---|
| Labor | Tom Tunnecliffe | 3,052 | 53.1 | −0.6 |
| Liberal | William Richards | 2,696 | 46.9 | +0.6 |
| Total formal votes | | 5,748 | 99.1 | −0.7 |
| Informal votes | | 51 | 0.9 | +0.7 |
| Turnout | | 5,799 | 71.3 | +4.6 |
| Labor hold | | Swing | −0.6 | |

=== East Melbourne ===
1911 Victorian state election: East Melbourne
| Party | Candidate | Votes | % | ±% |
|---|---|---|---|---|
| Liberal | Henry Weedon | 2,737 | 45.3 | N/A |
| Independent Liberal | Alfred Farthing | 1,716 | 28.4 | +28.4 |
| Labor | Frank Opitz | 1,588 | 26.3 | +26.3 |
| Total formal votes | | 6,043 | 98.2 | |
| Informal votes | | 111 | 1.8 | |
| Turnout | | 6,154 | 55.8 | |
Two-candidate-preferred result
| Independent Liberal | Alfred Farthing | 3,084 | 51.0 | |
| Liberal | Henry Weedon | 2,957 | 49.0 | |
| Independent gain from Liberal | | Swing | N/A | |

=== Essendon ===
1911 Victorian state election: Essendon
| Party | Candidate | Votes | % | ±% |
|---|---|---|---|---|
| Liberal | William Watt | 7,134 | 58.9 | +13.5 |
| Labor | Frank Keane | 4,987 | 41.1 | +0.1 |
| Total formal votes | | 12,121 | 99.0 | −0.6 |
| Informal votes | | 125 | 1.0 | +0.6 |
| Turnout | | 12,246 | 66.2 | +14.0 |
| Liberal hold | | Swing | N/A | |

=== Evelyn ===
1911 Victorian state election: Evelyn
| Party | Candidate | Votes | % | ±% |
|---|---|---|---|---|
| Liberal | Ewen Cameron | 2,831 | 58.1 | −1.9 |
| Independent | James Rouget | 909 | 18.7 | −21.3 |
| Labor | James Mirams | 666 | 13.7 | +13.7 |
| Independent | William Sell | 462 | 9.5 | +9.5 |
| Total formal votes | | 4,868 | 98.6 | −0.9 |
| Informal votes | | 71 | 1.4 | +0.9 |
| Turnout | | 4,939 | 56.8 | +20.1 |
| Liberal hold | | Swing | N/A | |

- Preferences were not distributed.

=== Fitzroy ===
1911 Victorian state election: Fitzroy
| Party | Candidate | Votes | % | ±% |
|---|---|---|---|---|
| Labor | John Billson | 4,486 | 63.6 | +12.4 |
| Liberal | Alexander McNair | 2,567 | 36.4 | −12.4 |
| Total formal votes | | 7,053 | 98.7 | −0.8 |
| Informal votes | | 95 | 1.3 | +0.8 |
| Turnout | | 7,148 | 52.1 | −1.4 |
| Labor hold | | Swing | +12.4 | |

=== Flemington ===
1911 Victorian state election: Flemington
| Party | Candidate | Votes | % | ±% |
|---|---|---|---|---|
| Labor | Edward Warde | 5,899 | 66.3 | +13.8 |
| Liberal | Edward Roberts | 3,001 | 33.7 | −13.8 |
| Total formal votes | | 8,900 | 98.7 | −0.7 |
| Informal votes | | 120 | 1.3 | +0.7 |
| Turnout | | 9,020 | 55.9 | +5.2 |
| Labor hold | | Swing | +13.8 | |

=== Geelong ===
1911 Victorian state election: Geelong
| Party | Candidate | Votes | % | ±% |
|---|---|---|---|---|
| Labor | William Plain | 5,026 | 59.4 | +4.0 |
| Liberal | Albyn Morley | 3,431 | 40.6 | +26.2 |
| Total formal votes | | 8,457 | 99.4 | −0.3 |
| Informal votes | | 52 | 0.6 | +0.3 |
| Turnout | | 8,509 | 73.9 | +17.1 |
| Labor hold | | Swing | N/A | |

=== Gippsland East ===
1911 Victorian state election: Gippsland East
| Party | Candidate | Votes | % | ±% |
|---|---|---|---|---|
| Liberal | James Cameron | 2,333 | 53.7 | −17.0 |
| Labor | Charles Francis | 2,010 | 46.3 | +46.3 |
| Total formal votes | | 4,343 | 99.2 | +0.1 |
| Informal votes | | 37 | 0.8 | −0.1 |
| Turnout | | 4,380 | 69.0 | +20.6 |
| Liberal hold | | Swing | N/A | |

=== Gippsland North ===
1911 Victorian state election: Gippsland North
| Party | Candidate | Votes | % | ±% |
|---|---|---|---|---|
| Labor | James McLachlan | 3,366 | 58.2 | +13.8 |
| Liberal | William Trenwith | 2,422 | 41.8 | +0.7 |
| Total formal votes | | 5,788 | 98.8 | −0.2 |
| Turnout | | 5,861 | 71.1 | +8.4 |
| Labor hold | | Swing | N/A | |

=== Gippsland South ===
1911 Victorian state election: Gippsland South
| Party | Candidate | Votes | % | ±% |
|---|---|---|---|---|
| Liberal | Thomas Livingston | unopposed | | |
| Liberal hold | | Swing | | |

=== Gippsland West ===
1911 Victorian state election: Gippsland West
| Party | Candidate | Votes | % | ±% |
|---|---|---|---|---|
| Liberal | John Mackey | 3,229 | 65.9 | N/A |
| Labor | Ebenezer Brown | 972 | 19.8 | +19.8 |
| Independent Liberal | Hugh Copeland | 701 | 14.3 | +14.3 |
| Total formal votes | | 4,902 | 98.5 | |
| Informal votes | | 77 | 1.5 | |
| Turnout | | 4,979 | 61.1 | |
Two-party-preferred result
| Liberal | John Mackey | | 78.8 | |
| Labor | Ebenezer Brown | | 21.2 | |
| Liberal hold | | Swing | N/A | |

- Two party preferred vote was estimated.

=== Glenelg ===
1911 Victorian state election: Glenelg
| Party | Candidate | Votes | % | ±% |
|---|---|---|---|---|
| Liberal | Hugh Campbell | 3,626 | 58.4 | N/A |
| Labor | Charles French | 2,585 | 41.6 | +41.6 |
| Total formal votes | | 6,211 | 98.2 | |
| Informal votes | | 114 | 1.8 | |
| Turnout | | 6,325 | 74.8 | |
| Liberal hold | | Swing | N/A | |

=== Goulburn Valley ===
1911 Victorian state election: Goulburn Valley
| Party | Candidate | Votes | % | ±% |
|---|---|---|---|---|
| Liberal | John Mitchell | unopposed | | |
| Liberal hold | | Swing | | |

=== Grenville ===
1911 Victorian state election: Grenville
| Party | Candidate | Votes | % | ±% |
|---|---|---|---|---|
| Labor | Charles McGrath | 3,168 | 64.6 | −7.4 |
| Liberal | David Poynton | 1,738 | 35.4 | +7.4 |
| Total formal votes | | 4,906 | 98.6 | −0.2 |
| Informal votes | | 71 | 1.4 | +0.2 |
| Turnout | | 4,977 | 72.0 | +8.8 |
| Labor hold | | Swing | −7.4 | |

=== Gunbower ===
1911 Victorian state election: Gunbower
| Party | Candidate | Votes | % | ±% |
|---|---|---|---|---|
| Liberal | Henry Angus | 2,883 | 51.0 | +51.0 |
| Liberal | John Cullen | 2,771 | 49.0 | N/A |
| Total formal votes | | 5,654 | 97.0 | |
| Informal votes | | 178 | 3.0 | |
| Turnout | | 5,832 | 74.3 | |
| Liberal hold | | Swing | N/A | |

=== Hampden ===
1911 Victorian state election: Hampden
| Party | Candidate | Votes | % | ±% |
|---|---|---|---|---|
| Liberal | David Oman | 3,853 | 52.8 | −8.2 |
| Labor | Charles Cairns | 2,906 | 39.9 | +0.9 |
| Independent Liberal | Archibald Hannah | 532 | 7.3 | +7.3 |
| Total formal votes | | 7,291 | 98.9 | −0.6 |
| Informal votes | | 85 | 1.1 | +0.6 |
| Turnout | | 7,376 | 67.0 | +16.7 |
Two-party-preferred result
| Liberal | David Oman | | 59.4 | −1.6 |
| Labor | Charles Cairns | | 40.6 | +1.6 |
| Liberal hold | | Swing | −1.6 | |

- Two party preferred vote was estimated.

=== Hawthorn ===
1911 Victorian state election: Hawthorn
| Party | Candidate | Votes | % | ±% |
|---|---|---|---|---|
| Liberal | George Swinburne | 8,344 | 63.3 | +13.2 |
| Labor | John Fraser | 3,594 | 27.3 | +27.3 |
| Independent Liberal | Frederick Dawborn | 1,238 | 9.4 | −40.5 |
| Total formal votes | | 13,356 | 98.5 | −1.0 |
| Informal votes | | 197 | 1.5 | +1.0 |
| Turnout | | 13,373 | 64.9 | +17.3 |
Two-party-preferred result
| Liberal | George Swinburne | | 70.9 | |
| Labor | John Fraser | | 29.1 | |
| Liberal hold | | Swing | N/A | |

- Two party preferred vote was estimated.

=== Jika Jika ===
1911 Victorian state election: Jika Jika
| Party | Candidate | Votes | % | ±% |
|---|---|---|---|---|
| Liberal | James Membrey | 6,852 | 57.1 | +2.5 |
| Labor | William Miller | 5,139 | 42.9 | −2.5 |
| Total formal votes | | 11,991 | 99.1 | −0.6 |
| Informal votes | | 104 | 0.9 | +0.6 |
| Turnout | | 12,095 | 65.9 | +18.2 |
| Liberal hold | | Swing | +2.5 | |

=== Kara Kara ===
1911 Victorian state election: Kara Kara
| Party | Candidate | Votes | % | ±% |
|---|---|---|---|---|
| Liberal | Peter McBride | unopposed | | |
| Liberal hold | | Swing | | |

=== Korong ===
1911 Victorian state election: Korong
| Party | Candidate | Votes | % | ±% |
|---|---|---|---|---|
| Liberal | Thomas Langdon | unopposed | | |
| Liberal hold | | Swing | | |

=== Lowan ===
1911 Victorian state election: Lowan
| Party | Candidate | Votes | % | ±% |
|---|---|---|---|---|
| Liberal | James Menzies | 4,464 | 77.1 | N/A |
| Labor | George McGowan | 1,328 | 22.9 | +22.9 |
| Total formal votes | | 5,792 | 98.3 | |
| Informal votes | | 101 | 1.7 | |
| Turnout | | 5,893 | 65.0 | |
| Liberal hold | | Swing | N/A | |

=== Maryborough ===
1911 Victorian state election: Maryborough
| Party | Candidate | Votes | % | ±% |
|---|---|---|---|---|
| Labor | Alfred Outtrim | 3,245 | 55.9 | N/A |
| Liberal | James Bennett | 2,562 | 44.1 | +44.1 |
| Total formal votes | | 5,807 | 98.9 | |
| Informal votes | | 63 | 1.1 | |
| Turnout | | 5,870 | 73.9 | |
| Labor hold | | Swing | N/A | |

=== Melbourne ===
1911 Victorian state election: Melbourne
| Party | Candidate | Votes | % | ±% |
|---|---|---|---|---|
| Labor | Alexander Rogers | 3,233 | 75.1 | +39.5 |
| Liberal | Tom Brennan | 1,070 | 24.9 | −5.2 |
| Total formal votes | | 4,303 | 98.3 | −1.1 |
| Informal votes | | 76 | 1.7 | +1.1 |
| Turnout | | 4,379 | 56.7 | +17.6 |
| Labor hold | | Swing | N/A | |

=== Mornington ===
1911 Victorian state election: Mornington
| Party | Candidate | Votes | % | ±% |
|---|---|---|---|---|
| Liberal | Alfred Downward | 3,643 | 47.0 | N/A |
| Labor | Francis Murphy | 2,775 | 35.8 | +35.8 |
| Independent Liberal | George Burchett | 1,331 | 17.2 | +17.2 |
| Total formal votes | | 7,749 | 98.4 | |
| Informal votes | | 126 | 1.6 | |
| Turnout | | 7,875 | 61.0 | |
Two-party-preferred result
| Liberal | Alfred Downward | 4,857 | 62.7 | N/A |
| Labor | Francis Murphy | 2,892 | 37.3 | +37.3 |
| Liberal hold | | Swing | N/A | |

=== North Melbourne ===
1911 Victorian state election: North Melbourne
| Party | Candidate | Votes | % | ±% |
|---|---|---|---|---|
| Labor | George Prendergast | 5,637 | 58.6 | N/A |
| Liberal | Solomon Bloom | 3,982 | 41.4 | +41.4 |
| Total formal votes | | 9,619 | 98.9 | |
| Informal votes | | 103 | 1.1 | |
| Turnout | | 9,722 | 64.8 | |
| Labor hold | | Swing | N/A | |

=== Ovens ===
1911 Victorian state election: Ovens
| Party | Candidate | Votes | % | ±% |
|---|---|---|---|---|
| Liberal | Alfred Billson | 2,599 | 60.7 | −0.9 |
| Labor | Christopher Bennett | 1,680 | 39.3 | +0.9 |
| Total formal votes | | 4,279 | 95.7 | −3.6 |
| Informal votes | | 191 | 4.3 | +3.6 |
| Turnout | | 4,470 | 64.3 | +5.7 |
| Liberal hold | | Swing | −0.9 | |

=== Polwarth ===
1911 Victorian state election: Polwarth
| Party | Candidate | Votes | % | ±% |
|---|---|---|---|---|
| Liberal | John Johnstone | 5,046 | 62.5 | +3.2 |
| Labor | John McDonald | 3,021 | 37.5 | +5.9 |
| Total formal votes | | 8,067 | 99.3 | −0.4 |
| Informal votes | | 54 | 0.7 | +0.4 |
| Turnout | | 8,121 | 76.8 | +18.7 |
| Liberal hold | | Swing | N/A | |

=== Port Fairy ===
1911 Victorian state election: Port Fairy
| Party | Candidate | Votes | % | ±% |
|---|---|---|---|---|
| Liberal | James Duffus | 2,839 | 50.5 | +3.6 |
| Labor | Jeremiah Wall | 2,781 | 49.5 | −3.6 |
| Total formal votes | | 5,620 | 96.1 | −3.1 |
| Informal votes | | 228 | 3.9 | +3.1 |
| Turnout | | 5,848 | 76.7 | +8.1 |
| Liberal gain from Labor | | Swing | +3.6 | |

=== Port Melbourne ===
1911 Victorian state election: Port Melbourne
| Party | Candidate | Votes | % | ±% |
|---|---|---|---|---|
| Labor | George Sangster | 6,295 | 82.0 | N/A |
| Independent Liberal | Reuben Kefford | 1,382 | 18.0 | +18.0 |
| Total formal votes | | 7,677 | 98.6 | |
| Informal votes | | 108 | 1.4 | |
| Turnout | | 7,785 | 50.6 | |
| Labor hold | | Swing | N/A | |

=== Prahran ===
1911 Victorian state election: Prahran
| Party | Candidate | Votes | % | ±% |
|---|---|---|---|---|
| Liberal | Donald Mackinnon | 5,472 | 58.7 | −8.8 |
| Labor | Frank Henty | 3,853 | 41.3 | +8.8 |
| Total formal votes | | 9,325 | 99.1 | −0.7 |
| Informal votes | | 88 | 0.9 | +0.7 |
| Turnout | | 9,413 | 52.7 | −0.2 |
| Liberal hold | | Swing | −8.8 | |

=== Richmond ===
1911 Victorian state election: Richmond
| Party | Candidate | Votes | % | ±% |
|---|---|---|---|---|
| Labor | Ted Cotter | 6,063 | 76.7 | +10.3 |
| Liberal | Norman O'Brien | 1,838 | 23.3 | +23.3 |
| Total formal votes | | 7,901 | 98.8 | −1.0 |
| Informal votes | | 98 | 1.2 | +1.0 |
| Turnout | | 7,999 | 55.2 | −13.2 |
| Labor hold | | Swing | N/A | |

=== Rodney ===
1911 Victorian state election: Rodney
| Party | Candidate | Votes | % | ±% |
|---|---|---|---|---|
| Liberal | Hugh McKenzie | 3,392 | 52.2 | N/A |
| Independent | Samuel Lancaster | 3,109 | 47.8 | +47.8 |
| Total formal votes | | 6,501 | 98.9 | |
| Informal votes | | 73 | 1.1 | |
| Turnout | | 6,574 | 74.0 | |
| Liberal hold | | Swing | N/A | |

=== St Kilda ===
1911 Victorian state election: St Kilda
| Party | Candidate | Votes | % | ±% |
|---|---|---|---|---|
| Liberal | Robert McCutcheon | 6,288 | 65.7 | +3.6 |
| Labor | George Mead | 3,285 | 34.3 | +34.3 |
| Total formal votes | | 9,573 | 98.1 | −1.0 |
| Informal votes | | 183 | 1.9 | +1.0 |
| Turnout | | 9,756 | 50.4 | +13.5 |
| Liberal hold | | Swing | N/A | |

=== Stawell and Ararat ===
1911 Victorian state election: Stawell and Ararat
| Party | Candidate | Votes | % | ±% |
|---|---|---|---|---|
| Liberal | Richard Toutcher | 3,598 | 59.2 | +14.6 |
| Labor | William Sewell | 2,484 | 40.8 | +8.1 |
| Total formal votes | | 6,084 | 99.1 | −0.5 |
| Informal votes | | 54 | 0.9 | +0.5 |
| Turnout | | 6,138 | 75.8 | +12.0 |
| Liberal hold | | Swing | N/A | |

=== Swan Hill ===
1911 Victorian state election: Swan Hill
| Party | Candidate | Votes | % | ±% |
|---|---|---|---|---|
| Liberal | John Gray | unopposed | | |
| Liberal hold | | Swing | | |

=== Toorak ===
1911 Victorian state election: Toorak
| Party | Candidate | Votes | % | ±% |
|---|---|---|---|---|
| Liberal | Norman Bayles | 6,801 | 59.4 | +5.5 |
| Independent Liberal | Frank Cornwall | 2,422 | 21.1 | −25.0 |
| Labor | Henry Duke | 2,234 | 19.5 | +19.5 |
| Total formal votes | | 11,457 | 98.5 | −1.2 |
| Informal votes | | 181 | 1.5 | +1.2 |
| Turnout | | 11,638 | 62.6 | +16.3 |
| Liberal hold | | Swing | N/A | |

- Preferences were not distributed.

=== Upper Goulburn ===
1911 Victorian state election: Upper Goulburn
| Party | Candidate | Votes | % | ±% |
|---|---|---|---|---|
| Independent | Malcolm McKenzie | 1,758 | 34.6 | +34.6 |
| Labor | Ernest Moloney | 1,285 | 25.3 | +25.3 |
| Liberal | George Cookson | 1,049 | 20.6 | −31.4 |
| Independent | Thomas Hunt | 990 | 19.5 | −28.5 |
| Total formal votes | | 5,082 | 98.1 | −1.5 |
| Informal votes | | 97 | 1.9 | +1.5 |
| Turnout | | 5,179 | 66.5 | +9.0 |
Two-candidate-preferred result
| Independent | Malcolm McKenzie | 2,885 | 56.8 | +56.8 |
| Labor | Ernest Moloney | 2,197 | 43.2 | +43.2 |
| Independent gain from Liberal | | Swing | N/A | |

=== Walhalla ===
1911 Victorian state election: Walhalla
| Party | Candidate | Votes | % | ±% |
|---|---|---|---|---|
| Liberal | Samuel Barnes | 2,032 | 62.2 | N/A |
| Labor | Samuel Reynolds | 1,232 | 37.7 | +37.7 |
| Total formal votes | | 3,264 | 98.6 | |
| Informal votes | | 45 | 1.4 | |
| Turnout | | 3,309 | 55.6 | |
| Liberal hold | | Swing | N/A | |

=== Wangaratta ===
1911 Victorian state election: Wangaratta
| Party | Candidate | Votes | % | ±% |
|---|---|---|---|---|
| Liberal | John Bowser | unopposed | | |
| Liberal hold | | Swing | | |

=== Waranga ===
1911 Victorian state election: Waranga
| Party | Candidate | Votes | % | ±% |
|---|---|---|---|---|
| Liberal | John Gordon | 2,845 | 50.1 | +24.4 |
| Independent | Henry Thomas | 2,829 | 49.9 | +29.9 |
| Total formal votes | | 5,674 | 99.0 | −0.2 |
| Informal votes | | 57 | 1.0 | +0.2 |
| Turnout | | 5,731 | 79.9 | +7.8 |
| Liberal hold | | Swing | N/A | |

=== Warrenheip ===
1911 Victorian state election: Warrenheip
| Party | Candidate | Votes | % | ±% |
|---|---|---|---|---|
| Liberal | George Holden | 2,252 | 62.4 | +8.5 |
| Labor | Daniel McNamara | 1,357 | 37.6 | +14.5 |
| Total formal votes | | 3,609 | 98.7 | −1.0 |
| Informal votes | | 49 | 1.3 | +1.0 |
| Turnout | | 3,658 | 63.1 | +2.2 |
| Liberal hold | | Swing | N/A | |

=== Warrnambool ===
1911 Victorian state election: Warrnambool
| Party | Candidate | Votes | % | ±% |
|---|---|---|---|---|
| Liberal | John Murray | 4,144 | 66.8 | +0.9 |
| Labor | Richard Morrison | 2,063 | 33.2 | −0.9 |
| Total formal votes | | 6,207 | 99.3 | −0.2 |
| Informal votes | | 47 | 0.7 | +0.2 |
| Turnout | | 6,254 | 72.1 | +14.9 |
| Liberal hold | | Swing | +0.9 | |

=== Williamstown ===
1911 Victorian state election: Williamstown
| Party | Candidate | Votes | % | ±% |
|---|---|---|---|---|
| Labor | John Lemmon | 7,020 | 74.3 | −3.8 |
| Liberal | John Packer | 2,431 | 25.7 | +3.8 |
| Total formal votes | | 9,547 | 98.9 | −0.8 |
| Informal votes | | 106 | 1.1 | +0.8 |
| Turnout | | 9,557 | 59.4 | +10.7 |
| Labor hold | | Swing | −3.8 | |

== See also ==
- 1911 Victorian state election
- Candidates of the 1911 Victorian state election
- Members of the Victorian Legislative Assembly, 1911–1914
