= Results of the 1914 Victorian state election (Legislative Assembly) =

Australian state election results

Victorian state election, 26 November 1914 Legislative Assembly << 1911–1917 >>
Enrolled voters	810,026				
Votes cast	319,950		Turnout	39.50	–15.90
Informal votes	7,294		Informal	2.27	+0.91
Summary of votes by party
Party	Primary votes	%	Swing	Seats	Change
Liberal	167,112	53.44	+6.83	42	– 2
Labor	121,562	38.88	–4.18	21	+ 2
Independent	24,022	7.68	–2.65	2	± 0
Total	312,696			65	

This is a list of electoral district results for the 1914 Victorian state election.

== Results by electoral district ==
=== Abbotsford ===
1914 Victorian state election: Abbotsford
Party	Candidate	Votes	%	±%
Labor	Gordon Webber	unopposed		
Labor hold		Swing		

=== Albert Park ===
1914 Victorian state election: Albert Park
Party	Candidate	Votes	%	±%
Labor	George Elmslie	unopposed		
Labor hold		Swing		

=== Allandale ===
1914 Victorian state election: Allandale
Party	Candidate	Votes	%	±%
Liberal	Alexander Peacock	unopposed		
Liberal hold		Swing		

=== Ballarat East ===
1914 Victorian state election: Ballarat East
Party	Candidate	Votes	%	±%
Liberal	Robert McGregor	4,079	53.6	−6.5
Labor	James Harrison	3,524	46.4	+10.0
Total formal votes		7,603	98.5	+0.3
Informal votes		113	1.5	−0.3
Turnout		7,716	70.2	−1.6
Liberal hold		Swing	−8.3	

=== Ballarat West ===
1914 Victorian state election: Ballarat West
Party	Candidate	Votes	%	±%
Liberal	Matthew Baird	4,390	61.3	+4.7
Labor	Thomas Richards	2,765	38.6	−4.7
Total formal votes		7,155	98.6	−0.5
Informal votes		104	1.4	+0.5
Turnout		7,259	67.8	−4.0
Liberal hold		Swing	+4.7	

=== Barwon ===
1914 Victorian state election: Barwon
Party	Candidate	Votes	%	±%
Liberal	James Farrer	3,711	59.4	+22.9
Labor	Alexander Parker	2,533	40.6	+2.9
Total formal votes		6,244	97.0	−1.4
Informal votes		194	3.0	+1.4
Turnout		6,438	56.8	−12.7
Liberal hold		Swing	−1.5	

=== Benalla ===
1914 Victorian state election: Benalla
Party	Candidate	Votes	%	±%
Liberal	John Carlisle	2,785	66.4	−6.4
Labor	Ebenezer Brown	1,411	33.6	+6.4
Total formal votes		4,196	98.0	−0.8
Informal votes		84	2.0	+0.8
Turnout		4,280	52.9	−9.2
Liberal hold		Swing	−6.4	

=== Benambra ===
1914 Victorian state election: Benambra
Party	Candidate	Votes	%	±%
Liberal	John Leckie	2,183	50.2	−11.9
Labor	John Ross	1,668	38.3	+0.5
Independent	Jorgen Petersen	500	11.5	+11.5
Total formal votes		4,351	98.2	0.0
Informal votes		82	1.8	0.0
Turnout		4,433	61.6	−7.5
Two-party-preferred result
Liberal	John Leckie		60.6	−1.5
Labor	John Ross		39.4	+1.5
Liberal hold		Swing	−1.5	

- Two party preferred vote was estimated.

=== Bendigo East ===
1914 Victorian state election: Bendigo East
Party	Candidate	Votes	%	±%
Labor	Alfred Hampson	3,126	57.8	−1.4
Liberal	John Curnow	2,287	42.2	+16.4
Total formal votes		5,413	97.1	−1.3
Informal votes		164	2.9	+1.3
Turnout		5,577	59.1	−2.4
Labor hold		Swing	−2.9	

=== Bendigo West ===
1914 Victorian state election: Bendigo West
Party	Candidate	Votes	%	±%
Liberal	David Andrew	2,879	43.5	−5.2
Independent	David Smith	2,190	33.1	+33.1
Labor	Arthur Cook	1,543	23.3	−28.0
Total formal votes		6,612	97.6	−0.8
Informal votes		166	2.4	+2.4
Turnout		6,778	64.7	+3.5
Two-candidate-preferred result
Independent	David Smith	3,315	50.1	+50.1
Liberal	David Andrew	3,297	49.9	+1.2
Independent gain from Labor		Swing	N/A	

=== Boroondara ===
1914 Victorian state election: Boroondara
Party	Candidate	Votes	%	±%
Liberal	Frank Madden	7,929	69.2	+8.8
Labor	Ralph Charrett	3,537	30.8	+30.8
Total formal votes		11,466	98.3	−1.1
Informal votes		204	1.7	+1.1
Turnout		11,670	38.9	−13.3
Liberal hold		Swing	N/A	

=== Borung ===
1914 Victorian state election: Borung
Party	Candidate	Votes	%	±%
Liberal	William Hutchinson	unopposed		
Liberal hold		Swing		

=== Brighton ===
1914 Victorian state election: Brighton
Party	Candidate	Votes	%	±%
Liberal	Oswald Snowball	5,348	72.3	−27.7
Labor	Albert Andrews	2,048	27.7	+27.7
Total formal votes		7,396	98.1	
Informal votes		144	1.9	
Turnout		7,540	41.2	
Liberal hold		Swing	N/A	

=== Brunswick ===
1914 Victorian state election: Brunswick
Party	Candidate	Votes	%	±%
Labor	James Jewell	6,318	62.1	+0.2
Liberal	Joseph Waxman	3,849	37.9	−0.2
Total formal votes		10,167	97.2	−1.7
Informal votes		298	2.8	+1.7
Turnout		10,465	48.2	−10.0
Labor hold		Swing	+0.2	

=== Bulla ===
1914 Victorian state election: Bulla
Party	Candidate	Votes	%	±%
Liberal	Andrew Robertson	3,689	62.2	+0.9
Labor	George McGowan	2,246	37.8	−0.9
Total formal votes		5,935	97.8	−0.6
Informal votes		131	2.2	+0.6
Turnout		6,066	55.9	−5.5
Liberal hold		Swing	+0.9	

=== Carlton ===
1914 Victorian state election: Carlton
Party	Candidate	Votes	%	±%
Labor	Robert Solly	unopposed		
Labor hold		Swing		

=== Castlemaine and Maldon ===
1914 Victorian state election: Castlemaine and Maldon
Party	Candidate	Votes	%	±%
Liberal	Harry Lawson	3,662	70.3	+8.8
Labor	Luke Clough	1,547	29.7	−8.8
Total formal votes		5,209	98.3	−1.0
Informal votes		90	1.7	+1.0
Turnout		5,299	72.0	−5.6
Liberal hold		Swing	+8.8	

=== Collingwood ===
1914 Victorian state election: Collingwood
Party	Candidate	Votes	%	±%
Labor	Martin Hannah	unopposed		
Labor hold		Swing		

=== Dalhousie ===
1914 Victorian state election: Dalhousie
Party	Candidate	Votes	%	±%
Independent	Allan Cameron	2,770	52.9	+52.9
Liberal	Reginald Argyle	2,465	47.1	−4.2
Total formal votes		5,235	97.9	−1.4
Informal votes		112	2.1	+1.4
Turnout		5,347	71.8	−5.9
Independent gain from Liberal		Swing	N/A	

=== Dandenong ===
1914 Victorian state election: Dandenong
Party	Candidate	Votes	%	±%
Liberal	William Keast	unopposed		
Liberal hold		Swing		

=== Daylesford ===
1914 Victorian state election: Daylesford
Party	Candidate	Votes	%	±%
Liberal	Donald McLeod	3,011	66.1	+12.0
Independent	Morton Dunlop	1,547	33.9	+33.9
Total formal votes		4,558	98.5	−0.4
Informal votes		68	1.5	+0.4
Turnout		4,626	64.1	−23.3
Liberal hold		Swing	N/A	

=== Dundas ===
1914 Victorian state election: Dundas
Party	Candidate	Votes	%	±%
Labor	Egerton Holden	2,740	44.5	+6.7
Liberal	William Smith	2,494	40.5	−19.9
Independent	John Loughnane	918	14.9	+14.9
Total formal votes		6,152	98.1	−0.2
Informal votes		122	1.9	+0.2
Turnout		6,274	71.3	−1.8
Two-party-preferred result
Liberal	William Smith	3,100	50.4	−10.0
Labor	Egerton Holden	3,052	49.6	+10.0
Liberal hold		Swing	−10.0	

=== Eaglehawk ===
1914 Victorian state election: Eaglehawk
Party	Candidate	Votes	%	±%
Labor	Tom Tunnecliffe	2,783	52.3	−0.8
Liberal	William Wallace	2,536	47.7	+0.8
Total formal votes		5,319	98.4	−0.7
Informal votes		87	1.6	+0.7
Turnout		5,406	52.1	−19.2
Labor hold		Swing	−0.8	

=== East Melbourne ===
1914 Victorian state election: East Melbourne
Party	Candidate	Votes	%	±%
Independent	Henry Weedon	1,990	29.8	+29.8
Liberal	Alfred Farthing	1,910	28.6	−16.7
Labor	Percy Clarey	1,853	27.8	+1.5
Independent	Valentine Cole	918	13.8	+13.8
Total formal votes		6,671	96.1	−2.1
Informal votes		270	3.9	+2.1
Turnout		6,941	52.1	−2.7
Two-party-preferred result
Liberal	Alfred Farthing	3,729	55.9	+4.9
Independent	Henry Weedon	2,942	44.1	−4.9
Liberal hold		Swing	+4.9	

=== Essendon ===
1914 Victorian state election: Essendon
Party	Candidate	Votes	%	±%
Labor	Maurice Blackburn	7,342	52.4	+11.3
Liberal	Edward Reynolds	6,660	47.6	−11.3
Total formal votes		14,002	98.6	−0.4
Informal votes		195	1.4	+0.4
Turnout		14,197	56.1	−10.1
Labor gain from Liberal		Swing	+11.3	

=== Evelyn ===
1914 Victorian state election: Evelyn
Party	Candidate	Votes	%	±%
Liberal	James Rouget	1,546	29.3	+10.6
Labor	Edward Duncan	1,285	24.4	+10.7
Liberal	George Maxwell	935	17.7	+17.7
Liberal	William Everard	804	15.2	+15.2
Liberal	William Sell	370	7.0	−2.5
Liberal	Edward Skardon	331	6.3	+6.3
Total formal votes		5,271	96.2	−2.4
Informal votes		210	3.8	+2.4
Turnout		5,481	52.7	−4.1
Two-party-preferred result
Liberal	James Rouget	3,436	65.2	+0.5
Labor	Edward Duncan	1,835	34.8	−0.5
Liberal hold		Swing	+0.5	

=== Fitzroy ===
1914 Victorian state election: Fitzroy
Party	Candidate	Votes	%	±%
Labor	John Billson	unopposed		
Labor hold		Swing		

=== Flemington ===
1914 Victorian state election: Flemington
Party	Candidate	Votes	%	±%
Labor	Edward Warde	unopposed		
Labor hold		Swing		

=== Geelong ===
1914 Victorian state election: Geelong
Party	Candidate	Votes	%	±%
Labor	William Plain	unopposed		
Labor hold		Swing		

=== Gippsland East ===
1914 Victorian state election: Gippsland East
Party	Candidate	Votes	%	±%
Liberal	James Cameron	1,788	46.0	−7.7
Labor	Edward Russell	1,756	45.2	−1.1
Independent	Donald McRae	342	8.8	+8.8
Total formal votes		3,886	97.7	−1.5
Informal votes		93	2.3	+1.5
Turnout		3,979	59.3	−9.7
Two-party-preferred result
Liberal	James Cameron	2,040	52.5	−1.2
Labor	Edward Russell	1,846	47.5	+1.2
Liberal hold		Swing	−1.2	

=== Gippsland North ===
1914 Victorian state election: Gippsland North
Party	Candidate	Votes	%	±%
Labor	James McLachlan	3,622	65.3	+7.1
Liberal	Francis Minchin	1,121	20.2	−21.6
Liberal	Walter Lyon	802	14.5	+14.5
Total formal votes		5,545	98.3	−0.5
Informal votes		95	1.7	+0.5
Turnout		5,640	60.0	−11.1
Two-party-preferred result
Labor	James McLachlan		66.7	+8.5
Liberal	Francis Minchin		33.3	−8.5
Labor hold		Swing	+8.5	

- Two party preferred vote was estimated.

=== Gippsland South ===
1914 Victorian state election: Gippsland South
Party	Candidate	Votes	%	±%
Liberal	Thomas Livingston	unopposed		
Liberal hold		Swing		

=== Gippsland West ===
1914 Victorian state election: Gippsland West
Party	Candidate	Votes	%	±%
Liberal	John Mackey	unopposed		
Liberal hold		Swing		

=== Glenelg ===
1914 Victorian state election: Glenelg
Party	Candidate	Votes	%	±%
Liberal	Hugh Campbell	3,449	58.1	−0.3
Labor	Charles Paramor	2,491	41.9	+0.3
Total formal votes		5,940	96.7	−1.5
Informal votes		200	3.3	+1.5
Turnout		6,140	66.0	−8.8
Liberal hold		Swing	−0.3	

=== Goulburn Valley ===
1914 Victorian state election: Goulburn Valley
Party	Candidate	Votes	%	±%
Liberal	John Mitchell	2,001	37.5	
Liberal	Patrick O'Hanlon	1,427	26.7	
Liberal	Thomas Lyons	1,094	20.5	
Liberal	Alexander McClelland	815	15.3	
Total formal votes		5,337	98.4	
Informal votes		86	1.6	
Turnout		5,423	58.9	
Two-candidate-preferred result
Liberal	John Mitchell	3,366	63.1	
Liberal	Patrick O'Hanlon	1,971	36.9	
Liberal hold		Swing	N/A	

=== Grenville ===
1914 Victorian state election: Grenville
Party	Candidate	Votes	%	±%
Labor	John Chatham	2,496	58.7	−5.9
Liberal	Nicholas Howell	1,758	41.3	+5.9
Total formal votes		4,254	97.9	−0.7
Informal votes		92	2.1	+0.7
Turnout		4,346	69.1	−2.9
Labor hold		Swing	−5.9	

=== Gunbower ===
1914 Victorian state election: Gunbower
Party	Candidate	Votes	%	±%
Liberal	Henry Angus	unopposed		
Liberal hold		Swing		

=== Hampden ===
1914 Victorian state election: Hampden
Party	Candidate	Votes	%	±%
Liberal	David Oman	4,296	60.1	+7.3
Labor	Patrick McMahon	2,850	39.9	0.0
Total formal votes		7,146	97.5	−1.4
Informal votes		183	2.5	+1.4
Turnout		7,329	59.7	−7.3
Liberal hold		Swing	+0.7	

=== Hawthorn ===
1914 Victorian state election: Hawthorn
Party	Candidate	Votes	%	±%
Liberal	William McPherson	6,187	76.1	+12.8
Independent	Frederick Dawborn	1,939	23.9	+14.5
Total formal votes		8,126	97.9	−0.6
Informal votes		171	2.1	+0.6
Turnout		8,297	34.5	−30.4
Liberal hold		Swing	N/A	

=== Jika Jika ===
1914 Victorian state election: Jika Jika
Party	Candidate	Votes	%	±%
Liberal	James Membrey	7,177	56.1	−1.0
Labor	Francis Morgan	5,623	43.9	+1.0
Total formal votes		12,800	98.2	−0.9
Informal votes		232	1.8	+0.9
Turnout		13,032	51.2	−14.7
Liberal hold		Swing	−1.0	

=== Kara Kara ===
1914 Victorian state election: Kara Kara
Party	Candidate	Votes	%	±%
Liberal	John Pennington	3,545	65.4	−34.6
Labor	Richard Taafe	1,872	34.6	+34.6
Total formal votes		5,275	98.2	
Informal votes		232	1.8	
Turnout		5,507	73.8	
Liberal hold		Swing	N/A	

=== Korong ===
1914 Victorian state election: Korong
Party	Candidate	Votes	%	±%
Liberal	Achilles Gray	2,611	63.6	−36.4
Independent	William Williams	1,496	36.4	+36.4
Total formal votes		4,107	97.1	
Informal votes		122	2.9	
Turnout		4,229	58.7	
Liberal hold		Swing	N/A	

=== Lowan ===
1914 Victorian state election: Lowan
Party	Candidate	Votes	%	±%
Liberal	James Menzies	unopposed		
Liberal hold		Swing		

=== Maryborough ===
1914 Victorian state election: Maryborough
Party	Candidate	Votes	%	±%
Labor	Alfred Outtrim	2,930	62.6	+6.7
Liberal	James Holland	1,748	37.4	−6.7
Total formal votes		4,678	98.3	−0.6
Informal votes		83	1.7	+0.6
Turnout		4,761	60.2	−13.7
Labor hold		Swing	+6.7	

=== Melbourne ===
1914 Victorian state election: Melbourne
Party	Candidate	Votes	%	±%
Labor	Alexander Rogers	2,799	64.0	−11.1
Liberal	Henry Hall	1,574	36.0	+11.1
Total formal votes		4,373	96.5	−1.8
Informal votes		159	3.5	+1.8
Turnout		4,532	44.8	−11.9
Labor hold		Swing	−11.1	

=== Mornington ===
1914 Victorian state election: Mornington
Party	Candidate	Votes	%	±%
Liberal	Alfred Downward	3,735	63.0	+16.0
Labor	Francis Murphy	2,193	37.0	+1.2
Total formal votes		5,928	96.5	−1.9
Informal votes		213	3.5	+1.9
Turnout		6,141	44.8	−16.2
Liberal hold		Swing	+0.3	

=== North Melbourne ===
1914 Victorian state election: North Melbourne
Party	Candidate	Votes	%	±%
Labor	George Prendergast	5,294	69.5	+10.9
Liberal	Henry Nolan	2,320	30.5	−10.9
Total formal votes		7,614	96.8	−2.1
Informal votes		253	3.2	+2.1
Turnout		7,867	45.0	−19.8
Labor hold		Swing	+10.9	

=== Ovens ===
1914 Victorian state election: Ovens
Party	Candidate	Votes	%	±%
Liberal	Alfred Billson	2,293	52.4	−8.3
Labor	Christopher Bennett	2,083	47.6	+8.3
Total formal votes		4,376	97.9	+2.2
Informal votes		93	2.1	−2.2
Turnout		4,469	66.2	+1.9
Liberal hold		Swing	−8.3	

=== Polwarth ===
1914 Victorian state election: Polwarth
Party	Candidate	Votes	%	±%
Liberal	John Johnstone	4,389	63.0	+0.5
Labor	John Considine	2,576	37.0	−0.5
Total formal votes		6,965	97.4	−1.9
Informal votes		189	2.6	+1.9
Turnout		7,154	64.4	−12.4
Liberal hold		Swing	+0.5	

=== Port Fairy ===
1914 Victorian state election: Port Fairy
Party	Candidate	Votes	%	±%
Labor	Henry Bailey	2,874	52.5	+3.0
Liberal	James Duffus	2,602	47.5	−3.0
Total formal votes		5,476	97.7	+1.6
Informal votes		132	2.3	−1.6
Turnout		5,608	71.2	−5.5
Labor gain from Liberal		Swing	+3.0	

=== Port Melbourne ===
1914 Victorian state election: Port Melbourne
Party	Candidate	Votes	%	±%
Labor	George Sangster	unopposed		
Labor hold		Swing		

=== Prahran ===
1914 Victorian state election: Prahran
Party	Candidate	Votes	%	±%
Liberal	Donald Mackinnon	4,913	52.4	−6.3
Labor	Henry Duke	4,462	47.6	+6.3
Total formal votes		9,375	97.7	−1.4
Informal votes		228	2.3	+1.4
Turnout		9,598	47.3	−5.4
Liberal hold		Swing	−6.3	

=== Richmond ===
1914 Victorian state election: Richmond
Party	Candidate	Votes	%	±%
Labor	Ted Cotter	6,335	76.3	−0.4
Liberal	Tom Brennan	1,967	23.7	+0.4
Total formal votes		8,302	97.4	−1.4
Informal votes		224	2.6	+1.4
Turnout		8,526	48.9	−6.3
Labor hold		Swing	−0.4	

=== Rodney ===
1914 Victorian state election: Rodney
Party	Candidate	Votes	%	±%
Liberal	Hugh McKenzie	3,575	50.3	−1.9
Labor	Andrew White	3,149	44.3	+44.3
Independent	Richard Abbott	385	5.4	+5.4
Total formal votes		7,109	97.7	−1.2
Informal votes		171	2.3	+1.2
Turnout		7,280	68.3	−5.7
Two-party-preferred result
Liberal	Hugh McKenzie		54.7	+1.7
Labor	Andrew White		45.3	+45.3
Liberal hold		Swing	N/A	

- Two party preferred vote was estimated.

=== St Kilda ===
1914 Victorian state election: St Kilda
Party	Candidate	Votes	%	±%
Liberal	Robert McCutcheon	5,975	64.5	−1.2
Labor	Robert Smart	3,287	35.5	+1.2
Total formal votes		9,262	98.4	+0.3
Informal votes		151	1.6	−0.3
Turnout		9,413	37.2	−13.2
Liberal hold		Swing	−1.2	

=== Stawell and Ararat ===
1914 Victorian state election: Stawell and Ararat
Party	Candidate	Votes	%	±%
Liberal	Richard Toutcher	3,124	55.4	−3.8
Labor	William Tibbles	2,520	44.6	+3.8
Total formal votes		5,644	98.1	−1.0
Informal votes		110	1.9	+1.0
Turnout		5,754	63.0	−12.8
Liberal hold		Swing	−3.8	

=== Swan Hill ===
1914 Victorian state election: Swan Hill
Party	Candidate	Votes	%	±%
Liberal	John Gray	3,459	58.5	−41.5
Liberal	Hugh McClelland	2,449	41.5	+41.5
Total formal votes		5,908	96.9	
Informal votes		190	3.1	
Turnout		6,098	45.5	
Liberal hold		Swing	N/A	

=== Toorak ===
1914 Victorian state election: Toorak
Party	Candidate	Votes	%	±%
Liberal	Norman Bayles	7,047	76.8	+17.4
Labor	Philip Behrend	2,129	23.2	+3.7
Total formal votes		9,176	98.0	−0.5
Informal votes		184	2.0	+0.5
Turnout		9,360	42.2	−20.4
Liberal hold		Swing	N/A	

=== Upper Goulburn ===
1914 Victorian state election: Upper Goulburn
Party	Candidate	Votes	%	±%
Liberal	Malcolm McKenzie	2,746	60.0	+39.4
Labor	Michael O'Brien	1,833	40.0	+14.7
Total formal votes		4,579	96.7	−1.4
Informal votes		155	3.3	+1.4
Turnout		4,734	57.5	−9.0
Liberal hold		Swing	N/A	

=== Walhalla ===
1914 Victorian state election: Walhalla
Party	Candidate	Votes	%	±%
Liberal	Samuel Barnes	1,811	63.9	+1.7
Labor	Edward Nichols	1,021	36.1	−1.7
Total formal votes		2,832	98.0	−0.6
Informal votes		58	2.0	+0.6
Turnout		2,890	43.5	−12.1
Liberal hold		Swing	+1.7	

=== Wangaratta ===
1914 Victorian state election: Wangaratta
Party	Candidate	Votes	%	±%
Liberal	John Bowser	3,269	70.8	−29.2
Labor	William Phillips	1,347	29.2	+29.2
Total formal votes		4,616	98.3	
Informal votes		78	1.7	
Turnout		4,694	55.1	
Liberal hold		Swing	N/A	

=== Waranga ===
1914 Victorian state election: Waranga
Party	Candidate	Votes	%	±%
Liberal	John Gordon	3,442	73.7	+23.6
Labor	Daniel Nagle	1,229	26.3	+26.3
Total formal votes		4,671	98.0	−1.0
Informal votes		98	2.0	+1.0
Turnout		4,769	67.6	−12.3
Liberal hold		Swing	N/A	

=== Warrenheip ===
1914 Victorian state election: Warrenheip
Party	Candidate	Votes	%	±%
Labor	Edmond Hogan	2,327	53.0	+15.4
Liberal	William Clark	2,062	47.0	−15.4
Total formal votes		4,389	97.5	−1.2
Informal votes		115	2.5	+1.2
Turnout		4,504	72.6	+9.5
Labor gain from Liberal		Swing	+15.4	

=== Warrnambool ===
1914 Victorian state election: Warrnambool
Party	Candidate	Votes	%	±%
Liberal	John Murray	3,715	62.9	−3.9
Labor	Alfred Pearce	2,195	37.1	+3.9
Total formal votes		5,910	97.2	−2.1
Informal votes		173	2.8	+2.1
Turnout		6,083	54.3	−17.8
Liberal hold		Swing	−3.9	

=== Williamstown ===
1914 Victorian state election: Williamstown
Party	Candidate	Votes	%	±%
Labor	John Lemmon	unopposed		
Labor hold		Swing		

== See also ==
- 1914 Victorian state election
- Candidates of the 1914 Victorian state election
- Members of the Victorian Legislative Assembly, 1914–1917
