= Candidates of the 1914 Victorian state election =

The 1914 Victorian state election was held on 26 November 1914.

== Retiring Members ==
=== Liberal ===
- Ewen Hugh Cameron (Evelyn)
- Thomas Langdon (Korong)
- George Graham (Goulburn Valley)
- John Thomson (Dundas)
- William Watt (Essendon)

== Legislative Assembly ==
Sitting members are shown in bold text. Successful candidates are highlighted in the relevant colour. Where there is possible confusion, an asterisk (*) is also used.

| Electorate | Held by | Labor candidates | Liberal candidates | Other candidates |
|---|---|---|---|---|
| Abbotsford | Labor | **Gordon Webber** | | |
| Albert Park | Labor | **George Elmslie** | | |
| Allandale | Liberal | | **Alexander Peacock** | |
| Ballarat East | Liberal | James Harrison | **Robert McGregor** | |
| Ballarat West | Liberal | Thomas Richards | **Matthew Baird** | |
| Barwon | Liberal | Alexander Parker | **James Farrer** | |
| Benalla | Liberal | Ebenezer Brown | **John Carlisle** | |
| Benambra | Liberal | John Ross | **John Leckie** | Jorgen Petersen (Ind) |
| Bendigo East | Labor | **Alfred Hampson** | John Curnow | |
| Bendigo West | Labor | Arthur Cook | David Andrew | **David Smith** (Ind) |
| Boroondara | Liberal | Ralph Charrett | **Frank Madden** | |
| Borung | Liberal | | **William Hutchinson** | |
| Brighton | Liberal | Albert Andrews | **Oswald Snowball** | |
| Brunswick | Labor | **James Jewell** | Joseph Waxman | |
| Bulla | Liberal | George McGowan | **Andrew Robertson** | |
| Carlton | Labor | **Robert Solly** | | |
| Castlemaine and Maldon | Liberal | Luke Clough | **Harry Lawson** | |
| Collingwood | Labor | **Martin Hannah** | | |
| Dalhousie | Liberal | | **Reginald Argyle** | Allan Cameron (Ind) |
| Dandenong | Liberal | | **William Keast** | |
| Daylesford | Liberal | | **Donald McLeod** | Morton Dunlop (Ind) |
| Dundas | Liberal | Egerton Holden | William Smith | John Loughnane (Ind) |
| Eaglehawk | Labor | **Tom Tunnecliffe** | William Wallace | |
| East Melbourne | Liberal | Percy Clarey | **Alfred Farthing** | Henry Weedon (Ind); Valentine Cole (Ind) |
| Essendon | Liberal | Maurice Blackburn | Edward Reynolds | |
| Evelyn | Liberal | Edward Duncan | James Rouget*; William Everard; George Maxwell; William Sell; Edward Skardon | |
| Fitzroy | Labor | **John Billson** | | |
| Flemington | Labor | **Edward Warde** | | |
| Geelong | Labor | **William Plain** | | |
| Gippsland East | Liberal | Edward Russell | **James Cameron** | Donald McRae (Ind) |
| Gippsland North | Labor | **James McLachlan** | Francis Minchin; Walter Lyon | |
| Gippsland South | Liberal | | **Thomas Livingston** | |
| Gippsland West | Liberal | | **John Mackey** | |
| Glenelg | Liberal | Charles Paramor | **Hugh Campbell** | |
| Goulburn Valley | Liberal | | John Mitchell*; Patrick O'Hanlon; Thomas Lyons; Alexander McClelland | |
| Grenville | Labor | **John Chatham** | Nicholas Howell | |
| Gunbower | Liberal | | **Henry Angus** | |
| Hampden | Liberal | Patrick McMahon | **David Oman** | |
| Hawthorn | Liberal | | **William McPherson** | Frederick Dawborn (Ind) |
| Jika Jika | Liberal | Francis Morgan | **James Membrey** | |
| Kara Kara | Liberal | Richard Taafe | **John Pennington** | |
| Korong | Liberal | | Achilles Gray | William Williams (Ind) |
| Lowan | Liberal | | **James Menzies** | |
| Maryborough | Labor | **Alfred Outtrim** | James Holland | |
| Melbourne | Labor | **Alexander Rogers** | Henry Hall | |
| Mornington | Liberal | Francis Murphy | **Alfred Downward** | |
| North Melbourne | Labor | **George Prendergast** | Henry Nolan | |
| Ovens | Liberal | Christopher Bennett | **Alfred Billson** | |
| Polwarth | Liberal | John Considine | **John Johnstone** | |
| Port Fairy | Liberal | Henry Bailey | **James Duffus** | |
| Port Melbourne | Labor | **George Sangster** | | |
| Prahran | Liberal | Henry Duke | **Donald Mackinnon** | |
| Richmond | Labor | **Ted Cotter** | Tom Brennan | |
| Rodney | Liberal | Andrew White | **Hugh McKenzie** | Richard Abbott (Ind) |
| St Kilda | Liberal | Robert Smart | **Robert McCutcheon** | |
| Stawell and Ararat | Liberal | William Tibbles | **Richard Toutcher** | |
| Swan Hill | Liberal | | **John Gray***; Hugh McClelland | |
| Toorak | Liberal | Philip Behrend | **Norman Bayles** | |
| Upper Goulburn | Liberal | Michael O'Brien | **Malcolm McKenzie** | |
| Walhalla | Liberal | Edward Nichols | **Samuel Barnes** | |
| Wangaratta | Liberal | William Phillips | **John Bowser** | |
| Waranga | Liberal | Daniel Nagle | **John Gordon** | |
| Warrenheip | Labor | **Edmond Hogan** | William Clark | |
| Warrnambool | Liberal | Alfred Pearce | **John Murray** | |
| Williamstown | Labor | **John Lemmon** | | |

== See also ==
- Members of the Victorian Legislative Assembly, 1911–1914
- Members of the Victorian Legislative Assembly, 1914–1917
