= Electoral results for the district of Flemington =

Victoria, Australia, district election results

This is a list of electoral results for the electoral district of Flemington in Victorian state elections.

== Members for Flemington ==
First incarnation 1904–1945
Member	Party	Term
Edward Warde	Labor	1904–1925
Jack Holland	Labor	1925–1945

Second incarnation 1955–1967
Member	Party	Term
Jack Holland	Labor	1955
Kevin Holland	Labor	1956–1967

== Election results ==
=== Elections in the 1960s ===
1964 Victorian state election: Flemington
Party	Candidate	Votes	%	±%
Labor	Kevin Holland	9,534	57.1	−5.5
Liberal and Country	Neal Greig	4,141	24.8	+5.4
Democratic Labor	Michael McMahon	3,026	18.1	+0.1
Total formal votes		16,701	96.4	−0.2
Informal votes		631	3.6	+0.2
Turnout		17,332	94.2	+0.7
Two-party-preferred result
Labor	Kevin Holland	9,989	59.8	−5.5
Liberal and Country	Neal Greig	6,712	40.2	+5.5
Labor hold		Swing	−5.5	

1961 Victorian state election: Flemington
Party	Candidate	Votes	%	±%
Labor	Kevin Holland	10,444	62.6	−0.6
Liberal and Country	John Marshall	3,232	19.4	+2.6
Democratic Labor	Michael McMahon	3,005	18.0	−2.0
Total formal votes		16,681	96.6	−1.2
Informal votes		593	3.4	+1.2
Turnout		17,274	93.5	−1.7
Two-party-preferred result
Labor	Kevin Holland	10,894	65.3	−0.9
Liberal and Country	John Marshall	5,787	34.7	+0.9
Labor hold		Swing	−0.9	

=== Elections in the 1950s ===
1958 Victorian state election: Flemington
Party	Candidate	Votes	%	±%
Labor	Kevin Holland	11,328	63.2	
Democratic Labor	Michael McMahon	3,585	20.0	
Liberal and Country	Norman Loader	3,015	16.8	
Total formal votes		17,928	97.8	
Informal votes		403	2.2	
Turnout		18,331	95.2	
Two-party-preferred result
Labor	Kevin Holland	11,865	66.2	
Liberal and Country	Norman Loader	6,063	33.8	
Labor hold		Swing		

- Two party preferred vote was estimated.

1956 Flemington state by-election
Party	Candidate	Votes	%	±%
Labor	Kevin Holland	8,067	62.2	−1.1
Labor (A-C)	John Madden	3,560	27.4	−9.3
Independent	John Jones	1,349	10.4	+10.4
Total formal votes		12,976	97.7	+1.7
Informal votes		299	2.3	−1.7
Turnout		13,275	80.6	−11.3
Labor hold		Swing	N/A	

- Preferences were not distributed.

1955 Victorian state election: Flemington
Party	Candidate	Votes	%	±%
Labor	Jack Holland	9,376	63.3	
Labor (A-C)	John Hayes	5,443	36.7	
Total formal votes		14,819	96.0	
Informal votes		611	4.0	
Turnout		15,430	91.9	
Labor hold		Swing		

=== Elections in the 1940s ===
1943 Victorian state election: Flemington
Party	Candidate	Votes	%	±%
Labor	Jack Holland	unopposed		
Labor hold		Swing		

1940 Victorian state election: Flemington
Party	Candidate	Votes	%	±%
Labor	Jack Holland	16,060	75.9	+10.0
United Australia	Raymond Trickey	5,096	24.1	−10.0
Total formal votes		21,156	98.3	−0.2
Informal votes		357	1.7	+0.2
Turnout		21,513	92.4	−3.7
Labor hold		Swing	+10.0	

=== Elections in the 1930s ===
1937 Victorian state election: Flemington
Party	Candidate	Votes	%	±%
Labor	Jack Holland	13,953	65.9	−2.8
United Australia	Malcolm Fenton	7,214	34.1	+2.8
Total formal votes		21,167	98.5	+0.3
Informal votes		334	1.5	−0.3
Turnout		21,501	96.1	+2.1
Labor hold		Swing	−2.8	

1935 Victorian state election: Flemington
Party	Candidate	Votes	%	±%
Labor	Jack Holland	14,131	68.7	+9.1
United Australia	Douglas Knight	6,423	31.3	+5.9
Total formal votes		20,554	98.2	+0.2
Informal votes		381	1.8	−0.2
Turnout		20,935	94.0	−1.1
Labor hold		Swing	+1.1	

1932 Victorian state election: Flemington
Party	Candidate	Votes	%	±%
Labor	Jack Holland	11,572	59.6	−40.4
United Australia	James Lamb	4,925	25.4	+25.4
Independent	Alexander Amess	2,918	15.0	+15.0
Total formal votes		19,415	98.0	
Informal votes		406	2.0	
Turnout		19,821	95.1	
Two-party-preferred result
Labor	Jack Holland		67.6	
United Australia	James Lamb		32.4	
Labor hold		Swing	N/A	

- Two party preferred vote was estimated.

=== Elections in the 1920s ===
1929 Victorian state election: Flemington
Party	Candidate	Votes	%	±%
Labor	Jack Holland	unopposed		
Labor hold		Swing		

1927 Victorian state election: Flemington
Party	Candidate	Votes	%	±%
Labor	Jack Holland	13,811	70.1	
Nationalist	Arthur Fenton	5,898	29.9	
Total formal votes		19,709	98.8	
Informal votes		238	1.2	
Turnout		19,947	92.0	
Labor hold		Swing		

1925 Flemington state by-election
Party	Candidate	Votes	%	±%
Labor	Jack Holland	unoppposed		
Labor hold		Swing		

1924 Victorian state election: Flemington
Party	Candidate	Votes	%	±%
Labor	Edward Warde	unopposed		
Labor hold		Swing		

1921 Victorian state election: Flemington
Party	Candidate	Votes	%	±%
Labor	Edward Warde	6,447	65.2	
Nationalist	Francis Clarey	3,433	34.8	
Total formal votes		9,880	99.1	
Informal votes		91	0.9	
Turnout		9,971	42.0	
Labor hold		Swing	N/A	

1920 Victorian state election: Flemington
Party	Candidate	Votes	%	±%
Labor	Edward Wade	unopposed		
Labor hold		Swing		

=== Elections in the 1910s ===
1917 Victorian state election: Flemington
Party	Candidate	Votes	%	±%
Labor	Edward Warde	7,062	69.7	
Nationalist	Thomas Ivory	3,072	30.3	
Total formal votes		10,134	95.7	
Informal votes		455	4.3	
Turnout		10,589	47.8	
Labor hold		Swing	N/A	

1914 Victorian state election: Flemington
Party	Candidate	Votes	%	±%
Labor	Edward Warde	unopposed		
Labor hold		Swing		

1911 Victorian state election: Flemington
Party	Candidate	Votes	%	±%
Labor	Edward Warde	5,899	66.3	+13.8
Liberal	Edward Roberts	3,001	33.7	−13.8
Total formal votes		8,900	98.7	−0.7
Informal votes		120	1.3	+0.7
Turnout		9,020	55.9	+5.2
Labor hold		Swing	+13.8	
