= Electoral results for the district of Korong =

Australian district election results

This is a list of electoral results for the electoral district of Korong in Victorian state elections.

== Members for Korong ==
First incarnation (1889–1927)
Member	Party	Term
Robert Calvert	Ministerialist	1889–1892
Thomas Langdon	Ministerialist	1892–1914
Achilles Gray	Ministerialist	1914–1917
Isaac Weaver	VFU	1917–1920
Isaac Weaver	Country	1920–1927
Second incarnation (1945–1955)
Member	Party	Term
(Sir) Albert Dunstan	Country	1945–1950
Keith Turnbull	Liberal and Country	1950–1955

== Election results ==
=== Elections in the 1950s ===
==== 1952 ====
1952 Victorian state election: Korong
Party	Candidate	Votes	%	±%
Liberal and Country	Keith Turnbull	4,359	36.2	−0.4
Labor	Campbell Turnbull	3,892	32.4	−0.3
Country	Frank Coghill	3,371	28.0	−2.7
Electoral Reform	Wallace Lunn	409	3.4	+3.4
Total formal votes		12,031	99.0	−0.3
Informal votes		125	1.0	+0.3
Turnout		12,156	95.2	−0.2
Two-party-preferred result
Liberal and Country	Keith Turnbull	7,332	60.9	+0.5
Labor	Campbell Turnbull	4,699	39.1	−0.5
Liberal and Country hold		Swing	+0.5	

==== 1950 ====
1950 Victorian state election: Korong
Party	Candidate	Votes	%	±%
Liberal and Country	Keith Turnbull	4,428	36.6	+36.6
Labor	Jack McLean	3,957	32.7	+3.8
Country	James Matheson	3,718	30.7	−40.4
Total formal votes		12,103	99.3	−0.1
Informal votes		89	0.7	+0.1
Turnout		12,192	95.4	+0.5
Two-party-preferred result
Liberal and Country	Keith Turnbull	7,313	60.4	+60.4
Labor	Jack McLean	4,790	39.6	+10.7
Liberal and Country gain from Country		Swing	N/A	

=== Elections in the 1940s ===
==== 1947 ====
1947 Victorian state election: Korong
Party	Candidate	Votes	%	±%
Country	Albert Dunstan	8,715	71.1	+3.3
Labor	Ernest Duus	3,547	28.9	−3.3
Total formal votes		12,262	99.4	+0.2
Informal votes		70	0.6	−0.2
Turnout		12,332	94.9	+6.4
Country hold		Swing	+3.3	

==== 1945 ====
1945 Victorian state election: Korong
Party	Candidate	Votes	%	±%
Country	Albert Dunstan	7,662	67.8	
Labor	William Casey	3,647	32.2	
Total formal votes		11,309	99.2	
Informal votes		91	0.8	
Turnout		11,400	88.5	
Country hold		Swing		

=== Elections in the 1920s ===
==== 1924 ====
1924 Victorian state election: Korong
Party	Candidate	Votes	%	±%
Country	Isaac Weaver	2,791	67.5	+5.6
Nationalist	John O'Brien	1,342	32.5	−5.6
Total formal votes		4,133	99.7	+0.3
Informal votes		12	0.3	−0.3
Turnout		4,145	63.6	−3.8
Country hold		Swing	+5.6	

==== 1921 ====
1921 Victorian state election: Korong
Party	Candidate	Votes	%	±%
Victorian Farmers	Isaac Weaver	2,835	61.9	−18.8
Nationalist	Peter Hansen	1,742	38.1	+18.8
Total formal votes		4,577	99.4	+5.1
Informal votes		30	0.6	−5.1
Turnout		4,607	67.4	+3.7
Victorian Farmers hold		Swing	−18.8	

==== 1920 ====
1920 Victorian state election: Korong
Party	Candidate	Votes	%	±%
Victorian Farmers	Isaac Weaver	3,314	80.7	+25.6
Nationalist	Charles Kelly	794	19.3	−25.6
Total formal votes		4,108	94.3	−2.9
Informal votes		250	5.7	+2.9
Turnout		4,358	63.7	+3.0
Victorian Farmers hold		Swing	+25.6	

=== Elections in the 1910s ===
==== 1917 ====
1917 Victorian state election: Korong
Party	Candidate	Votes	%	±%
Victorian Farmers	Isaac Weaver	2,306	55.1	+55.1
Nationalist	Achilles Gray	1,876	44.9	−18.7
Total formal votes		4,182	97.1	0.0
Informal votes		123	2.9	0.0
Turnout		4,305	60.7	+2.0
Victorian Farmers gain from Nationalist		Swing	N/A	

==== 1914 ====
1914 Victorian state election: Korong
Party	Candidate	Votes	%	±%
Liberal	Achilles Gray	2,611	63.6	+0.7
Independent	William Williams	1,496	36.4	−0.7
Total formal votes		4,107	97.1	
Informal votes		122	2.9	
Turnout		4,229	58.7	
Liberal hold		Swing	N/A	

==== 1914 by-election ====
1914 Korong state by-election
Party	Candidate	Votes	%	±%
Liberal	Achilles Gray	2,502	62.9	+62.9
Liberal	William Williams	1,474	37.1	+37.1
Total formal votes		3,976	98.3	N/A
Informal votes		69	1.7	N/A
Turnout		4,045	59.9	N/A
Liberal hold		Swing	N/A	

==== 1911 ====
1911 Victorian state election: Korong
Party	Candidate	Votes	%	±%
Liberal	Thomas Langdon	unopposed		
Liberal hold		Swing		

=== Elections in the 1900s ===
==== 1907 by-election ====
1907 Korong state by-election
Party	Candidate	Votes	%	±%
United Liberal	Thomas Langdon	unopposed		
Registered electors		2,787		
United Liberal hold		Swing	N/A	
