= Candidates of the 1911 Victorian state election =

The 1911 Victorian state election was held on 16 November 1911.

== Retiring Members ==
=== Liberal ===
- Charles Forrest (Polwarth)
- Robert Stanley (Lowan)

== Legislative Assembly ==
Sitting members are shown in bold text. Successful candidates are highlighted in the relevant colour. Where there is possible confusion, an asterisk (*) is also used.

Electorate	Held by	Labor candidates	Liberal candidates	Other candidates
Abbotsford	Labor	**William Beazley**	George Martin	
Albert Park	Labor	**George Elmslie**	Ernest Joske	William Gaunson (Ind)
Allandale	Liberal	Walter Miller	**Alexander Peacock**	
Ballarat East	Liberal	David Russell	**Robert McGregor**	James McNeil (Ind)
Ballarat West	Labor	**Andrew McKissock**	Matthew Baird	
Barwon	Liberal	William Brownbill	**James Farrer**	William Kendell (Ind)
Benalla	Liberal	Gerald Stanley	**John Carlisle**	
Benambra	Liberal	Abraham Wright	**Albert Craven**	
Bendigo East	Labor	**Alfred Hampson**	Luke Murphy	George Knight (Ind.Lib)
Bendigo West	Labor	**David Smith**	David Andrew	
Boroondara	Liberal		**Frank Madden**	Harold Wilkinson (Ind.Lib)
Borung	Liberal		**William Hutchinson**	
Brighton	Liberal		**Oswald Snowball**	
Brunswick	Labor	**James Jewell**	David Phillips	
Bulla	Liberal	Andrew Davidson	**Andrew Robertson**	
Carlton	Labor	**Robert Solly**	John Gardiner	
Castlemaine and Maldon	Liberal	Luke Clough	**Harry Lawson**	
Collingwood	Labor	**Martin Hannah**	Stanley Lewis	
Dalhousie	Liberal	Richard Taafe	**Reginald Argyle**	John Duffy (Ind)
Dandenong	Liberal		**William Keast**	
Daylesford	Liberal	John Hannan	**Donald McLeod**	
Dundas	Liberal	Neil Mackinnon	**John Thomson**	Duncan McLennan (Ind.Lib)
Eaglehawk	Labor	**Tom Tunnecliffe**	William Richards	
East Melbourne	Liberal	Frank Opitz	**Henry Weedon**	Alfred Farthing (Ind.Lib)
Essendon	Liberal	Frank Keane	**William Watt**	
Evelyn	Liberal	James Mirams	**Ewen Cameron**	James Rouget (Ind); William Sell (Ind)
Fitzroy	Labor	**John Billson**	Alexander McNair	
Flemington	Labor	**Edward Warde**	Edward Roberts	
Geelong	Labor	**William Plain**	Albyn Morley	
Gippsland East	Liberal	Charles Francis	**James Cameron**	
Gippsland North	Labor	**James McLachlan**	William Trenwith	
Gippsland South	Liberal		**Thomas Livingston**	
Gippsland West	Liberal	Ebenezer Brown	**John Mackey**	Hugh Copeland (Ind.Lib)
Glenelg	Liberal	Charles French	**Hugh Campbell**	
Goulburn Valley	Liberal		John Mitchell	
Grenville	Labor	**Charles McGrath**	David Poynton	
Gunbower	Liberal		Henry Angus*; **John Cullen**	
Hampden	Liberal	Charles Cairns	**David Oman**	Archibald Hannah (Ind.Lib)
Hawthorn	Liberal	John Fraser	**George Swinburne**	Frederick Dawborn (Ind.Lib)
Jika Jika	Liberal	William Miller	**James Membrey**	
Kara Kara	Liberal		**Peter McBride**	
Korong	Liberal		**Thomas Langdon**	
Lowan	Liberal	George McGowan	James Menzies	
Maryborough	Labor	**Alfred Outtrim**	James Bennett	
Melbourne	Labor	**Alexander Rogers**	Tom Brennan	
Mornington	Liberal	Francis Murphy	**Alfred Downward**	George Burchett (Ind.Lib)
North Melbourne	Labor	**George Prendergast**	Solomon Bloom	
Ovens	Liberal	Christopher Bennett	**Alfred Billson**	
Polwarth	Liberal	John McDonald	John Johnstone	
Port Fairy	Labor	**Jeremiah Wall**	James Duffus	
Port Melbourne	Labor	**George Sangster**		Reuben Kefford (Ind.Lib)
Prahran	Liberal	Frank Henty	**Donald Mackinnon**	
Richmond	Labor	**Ted Cotter**	Norman O'Brien	
Rodney	Liberal		**Hugh McKenzie**	Samuel Lancaster (Ind)
St Kilda	Liberal	George Mead	**Robert McCutcheon**	
Stawell and Ararat	Liberal	William Sewell	**Richard Toutcher**	
Swan Hill	Liberal		**John Gray**	
Toorak	Liberal	Henry Duke	**Norman Bayles**	Frank Cornwall (Ind.Lib)
Upper Goulburn	Liberal	Ernest Moloney	**George Cookson**	Malcolm McKenzie* (Ind); Thomas Hunt (Ind)
Walhalla	Liberal	Samuel Reynolds	**Samuel Barnes**	
Wangaratta	Liberal		**John Bowser**	
Waranga	Liberal		**John Gordon**	Henry Thomas (Ind)
Warrenheip	Liberal	Daniel McNamara	**George Holden**	
Warrnambool	Liberal	Richard Morrison	**John Murray**	
Williamstown	Labor	**John Lemmon**	John Packer	

== See also ==
- Members of the Victorian Legislative Assembly, 1908–1911
- Members of the Victorian Legislative Assembly, 1911–1914
