= 1914 Korong state by-election =

- 26 June 1914

Electoral district of Korong in the Victorian Legislative Assembly
| | First party | Second party |
|---|---|---|
| | LIB | LIB |
| Candidate | Achilles Gray | William Williams |
| Party | Liberal | Liberal |
| Popular vote | 2,502 | 1,474 |
| Percentage | 62.9% | 37.1% |
| Swing | ▲62.9 | ▲37.1 |
MP before election
Thomas Langdon
Liberal
Elected MP
Achilles Gray
Liberal

The 1914 Korong state by-election was held on 26 June 1914 to elect the next member for Korong in the Victorian Legislative Assembly, following the death of incumbent MP Thomas Langdon.

Langdon, a Liberal Party member, had been re-elected unopposed at the 1911 election. He died on 27 May 1914, aged 82.

The by-election was won by Achilles Gray, with both candidates being Liberals. A state election was held just months later on 26 November 1914, which was again contested by Gray and unsuccessful candidate William Williams.

== Results ==
1914 Korong state by-election
| Party | Candidate | Votes | % | ±% |
|---|---|---|---|---|
| Liberal | Achilles Gray | 2,502 | 62.9 | +62.9 |
| Liberal | William Williams | 1,474 | 37.1 | +37.1 |
| Total formal votes | | 3,976 | 98.3 | N/A |
| Informal votes | | 69 | 1.7 | N/A |
| Turnout | | 4,045 | 59.9 | N/A |
| Liberal hold | | Swing | N/A | |
