= 1907 Korong state by-election =

- 25 January 1907

Electoral district of Korong in the Victorian Legislative Assembly
	First party
	ULP
Candidate	Thomas Langdon
Party	United Liberal
Popular vote	unopposed
Percentage	100%
MP before election
Thomas Langdon
United Liberal
Elected MP
Thomas Langdon
United Liberal

The 1907 Korong state by-election was held on 25 January 1907 to elect the next member for Korong in the Victorian Legislative Assembly, following the resignation of incumbent United Liberal Party MP Thomas Langdon.

As was required at the time, Langdon forfeited his seat after joining the Bent ministry to serve as Chief Secretary of Victoria and Minister for Labour.

Langdon recontested the seat and was elected unopposed. A state election was held just months later on 15 March 1907, where Langdon was again re-elected.

== Results ==
1907 Korong state by-election
Party	Candidate	Votes	%	±%
United Liberal	Thomas Langdon	unopposed		
Registered electors		2,787		
United Liberal hold		Swing	N/A	
