= Robert McClure (disambiguation) =

Robert McClure (1807–1873) was an Irish explorer of the Arctic.

Bob or Rob or Robert McClure may also refer to:

- Robert A. McClure (1897–1957), American soldier and psychological warfare specialist
- Robert B. McClure (1896–1973), American soldier
- Robert Baird McClure (1900–1991), Canadian physician and Christian missionary
- Bob McClure (Robert Craig McClure, born 1952), Major League Baseball pitcher
- Bob McClure (footballer) (Robert Johnstone "Bluey" McClure, 1925–2003), Australian rules footballer
- Bob McClure (1920s pitcher) (1891–1931), American Negro leagues baseball player nicknamed "Big Boy"
- Bob McClure (politician) (John Robert McClure, 1913–1983), Australian politician
- Rob McClure (Robert "Rob" McClure, born 1982), American actor
