= Kevin Holland (disambiguation) =

Kevin Holland (born 1992) is an American mixed martial artist.

Kevin Holland may also refer to:

- Kevin Holland (Canadian politician), Canadian politician
- Kevin Holland (Australian politician) (1910–1996), Australian politician

== See also ==
- Kevin Crossley-Holland, (born 1941), British author
