= Samuel Samuel (Australian politician) =

Australian politician (1836–1892)

Samuel E. Samuel

Member of the Victorian Legislative Assembly for Dundas
- In office 20 April 1892 – 27 July 1892
- Preceded by: Charles Myles Officer
- Succeeded by: John Thomson

Personal details
- Born: 1836 Dublin, Ireland
- Died: July 27, 1892 (aged 55–56) Melbourne, Victoria

Samuel E. Samuel (1836 – 27 July 1892) was an Irish-born Australian solicitor and politician. He served as a member of the Victorian Legislative Assembly in 1892.

== Biography ==
Samuel was born in Dublin, Ireland, in 1836.

In the Colony of Victoria, he worked as a solicitor. Eventually, he established the law firm Samuel & Horwitz.

Samuel was elected to the Electoral district of Dundas at the 1892 Victorian colonial election.

Samuel died on 27 July 1892, 98 days after the election. He was found dead in his hotel room, having suffocated in his sleep. At the 1892 Dundas colonial by-election, he was replaced by John Thomson.
