= Electoral district of Essendon and Flemington =

Former electoral district of Victoria, Australia

Essendon and Flemington Victoria—Legislative Assembly
- State: Victoria
- Created: 1889
- Abolished: 1904
- Demographic: Metropolitan

Essendon and Flemington was an electoral district of the Victorian Legislative Assembly from 1889 to 1904. It was held for most of its existence by future Prime Minister Alfred Deakin before his switch to federal politics in 1901. It was abolished in 1904 and replaced with separate Essendon and Flemington electorates.

== Members for Essendon and Flemington ==
Member	Party	Term
Alfred Deakin	Independent	1889–1900
Edward Warde	Labor	1900–1904
