= Bill Slater (politician) =

Australian politician

The Honourable William Slater
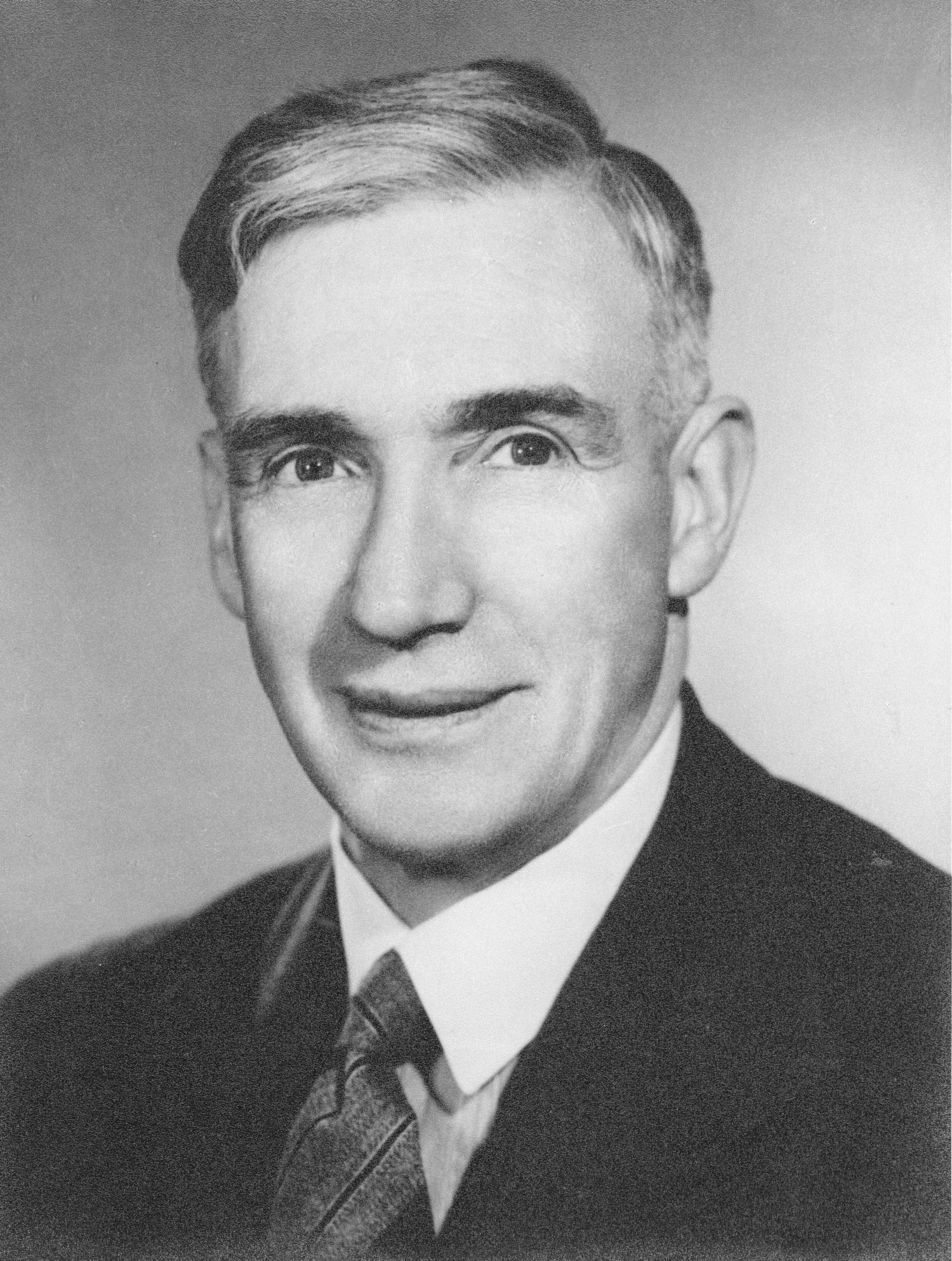

Member of the Victorian Legislative Assembly for Dundas
- In office 15 November 1917 – 14 May 1932
- Preceded by: William Kennedy Smith
- Succeeded by: Athol Cooper
- In office 6 September 1932 – 8 November 1947
- Preceded by: Athol Cooper
- Succeeded by: William McDonald

Member of the Victorian Legislative Council for Doutta Galla Province
- In office 18 June 1949 – 19 June 1960
- Preceded by: Percy Clarey
- Succeeded by: John Tripovich

1st Australian Minister to the Soviet Union
- In office January 1943 – April 1943
- Succeeded by: Noël Deschamps (Chargé d'Affaires)

Personal details
- Born: 20 May 1890 (approximate) Wangaratta, Victoria
- Died: 19 June 1960 (aged 70) South Melbourne, Victoria
- Party: Labor Party
- Spouse: Mary Gordon (1923–1960)
- Children: 3
- Profession: Lawyer

Military service
- Branch/service: Australian Imperial Force
- Years of service: 1915–1918
- Rank: Private
- Unit: 10th Field Ambulance
- Battles/wars: World War I

William Slater (c. 20 May 1890 – 19 June 1960) was an Australian lawyer, politician and diplomat.

== Early life ==
Slater is believed to have been born around 20 May 1890 to William Slater, a travelling salesman and Maria (née O’Reilly or Reilly) in Wangaratta, Victoria. He had two siblings. After his father left his family when he was four years old, he and his two siblings were brought up by his mother in poverty in Prahran. After briefly attending Armadale State School, Slater left school early to sell newspapers outside the Alfred Hospital Melbourne, he had no shoes. Being caught and fined for nude swimming in the Yarra River led him to decide to better himself. He continued his education at Try Boys’ Society South Yarra and by reading at Prahran Free Library where he met Maurice Blackburn. His Try Boys education and independent reading enabled him to take up legal studies at The University of Melbourne later on. He became a friend for life with Maurice Blackburn. They shared socialist ideals in their legal practice and political activities, and working for stricter legal controls for gambling.

In 1910 he was employed as a clerk for Percy Park, a solicitor based in Mildura 544 kilometres (338 miles) from Melbourne. While living in Mildura, Slater saved enough money to buy two small fruit properties.

== War ==
As a socialist, Slater refused to enlist with voluntary the Australian Imperial Force (AIF) at the beginning of World War I. However, spurred on by the aftermath of the Gallipoli campaign, he decided to enlist with the AIF. His first attempt to enlist was unsuccessful as he was deemed unsuitable for service due to varicose veins. After an operation to fix the ailment he enlisted in December 1915 with the 10th Field Ambulance.

Slater left Melbourne with his unit in June 1916, arriving in Plymouth, England in August of the same year. In November he was disciplined for poor conduct. In July 1917 he was wounded in action, sustaining a gunshot wound to the leg.

== Politics & The Law ==
While recovering in an English hospital he agreed to stand for election to the Victorian Legislative Assembly. In November 1917 he was elected to the seat of Dundas. The Argus newspaper later reported that fellow patients at the hospital mistook his appointment as a Member of Parliament as being a promotion to the Military Police.

He left for Australia in early 1918. Returning to Australia he was arrested by military police in Fremantle for speaking in defence of John Curtin, then the editor of a trade union newspaper. He was discharged from active service due to a recurrence of his varicose veins.

On his return to Victoria he was engaged by Maurice Blackburn as an articled clerk. When he was admitted as a barrister and solicitor in 1922 he became a partner in Blackburn's practice which was renamed Blackburn and Slater.

Slater was President of the Law Institute of Victoria 1928–29.

He was Attorney-General and Solicitor General on 5 occasions. In July 1924 he was appointed Attorney-General and Solicitor General in the Prendergast government which only lasted five months. He was given the same cabinet posts under the premierships of Edmond Hogan in 1927–1928 and 1929–1932.

At the 1932 state election, Slater was defeated in Dundas by United Australia Party candidate Athol Cooper. However the closeness of the result prompted a recount, and on 6 September 1932, the Committee of Elections and Qualifications presented its report on the recount to the parliament, which unseated Cooper and declared Slater duly elected.

In 1935 he entered into partnership with Hugh Gordon, his brother-in-law, forming Slater & Gordon. He focussed on legal work for the Trade Union movement.

Slater was appointed as Speaker of the Victorian Legislative Assembly in 1940.

In 1942 he was appointed by Prime Minister John Curtin as minister to the Soviet Union, the first Australian diplomatic representative to the country. En route to his new appointment he visited the United States, eventually arriving in the Soviet Union in late 1942. He took residence in Kuybyshev in January 1943. After falling ill in April 1943 he returned to Australia in June. Although the official reason given for his early return was illness, speculation in the Australian press centred on a disillusionment with the Soviet version of Socialism.

Under John Cain he was Attorney-General and Solicitor-General between 1945 and 1947 when he lost his seat. In 1949 he returned to Parliament in the Victorian Legislative Council seat of Doutta Galla. He once again served as Attorney-General and Solicitor-General between 1952 and 1955.

== Australian Natives' Association ==
Hon. William “Bill” Slater joined Australian Natives' Association (ANA) in 1918, just after his return from overseas service in World War 1. He attended his first Annual Conference at Mildura in 1922 representing Hamilton ANA Branch No.32. He was elected to the board of directors at Bairnsdale Conference in 1923, and elected Chief President at Sorrento Annual Conference in 1926. Bill was later a member of Essendon North Branch No.308. Bill was honorary solicitor for ANA from 1933 for a very long time. He was a long-standing member of Victorian Parliament. He represented ANA's position on immigration in Parliament in 1958

== Family and Sport ==
On 19 December 1923 he married Mary Gordon, aged 26, who was a senior botany demonstrator at The University of Melbourne. They had a daughter and 2 sons.

As a young man he was a keen sportsman in football and long distance open water swimming. He was a Trustee of the Melbourne Cricket Ground (MCG) for 30 years and a Vice President of the Essendon Football Club (VFL) and he was involved in many community activities.

== Death ==
Slater died in 1960 of a heart attack in South Melbourne. He was survived by his wife and three children.

Victorian Legislative Assembly
| Preceded by William Kennedy Smith | Member for Dundas; 1917–1932 | Succeeded by Athol Cooper |
| Preceded by Athol Cooper | Member for Dundas; 1932–1947 | Succeeded by William McDonald |
| Preceded by Tom Tunnecliffe | Speaker of the Victorian Legislative Assembly; 1940–1942 | Succeeded by George Knox |
Diplomatic posts
| New title Position established | Australian Minister to the Soviet Union; 1942–1943 | Succeeded by Jim Maloney |
Victorian Legislative Council
| Preceded by Percy Clarey | Member for Doutta Galla Province; 1949–1960; Served alongside: Paul Jones (1949–58); Samuel Merrifield (1958–60) | Succeeded by John Tripovich |
