= Jack Holland (politician) =

Australian politician (1877–1955)

John Joseph Holland

Member of the Victorian Legislative Assembly for Flemington
- In office 1925–1945
- Preceded by: Edward Warde
- Succeeded by: Seat abolished

Member of the Victorian Legislative Assembly for Footscray
- In office 1945–1955
- Preceded by: Jack Mullens
- Succeeded by: Roy Schintler

Member of the Victorian Legislative Assembly for Flemington
- In office 1955–1955
- Preceded by: New seat
- Succeeded by: Kevin Holland

Personal details
- Born: 3 September 1877; Carlton, Victoria, Australia
- Died: 25 December 1955 (aged 78); Kensington, Victoria, Australia
- Political party: Labor
- Spouse: Agnes Mary Ryan (m. 1908; death 1955)
- Occupation: Fitter; electrical engineer

John Joseph Holland (3 September 1877 – 25 December 1955) was an Australian politician. He was an Australian Labor Party member of the Victorian Legislative Assembly from 1925 to 1955, representing the electorates of Flemington (1925–1945), Footscray (1945–1955) and Flemington again (1955).

== Early life and career ==
Holland was born in Carlton to police officer Thomas Holland and Johanna Quigley (both born in Ireland). He worked as a fitter and then as an electrical engineer for the Postmaster-General's Department. He was a life member of both the Australian Postal Electricians Union, serving as its secretary and president at various times, as well as its delegate to the Melbourne Trades Hall Council and the Victorian Agricultural Implement Union, of which he had been president. He was also secretary of the Flemington branch of the Labor Party from 1911 to 1932, served on the boards of a number of local co-operatives and on the Victorian Public Servants Credit Co-operative board for 35 years. On 18 July 1908, he married Agnes Mary Ryan, with whom he had seven children.

== Political career ==
In 1925, he was elected to the Victorian Legislative Assembly as the Labor member for Flemington. During his time in parliament, he appeared on radio on 3KZ's "Labor Hour" from 1931 to 1946, was state president of the Labor Party from 1935 to 1936, and served concurrently as a City of Melbourne councillor alongside his parliamentary role from 1943. In September 1943, he was Minister for Public Works in John Cain's five-day Labor government. In 1945, the electorate of Flemington was abolished, and he moved to the Footscray electorate, but returned to Flemington when it was re-created in 1955.

== Death and legacy ==
Holland died at Kensington on Christmas Day 1955 and was buried at Melbourne General Cemetery. His son Kevin won the resulting by-election. Holland is the great-grandfather of Liberal MP Moira Deeming. J. J. Holland Park in Kensington is named for him.

Victorian Legislative Assembly
| Preceded by Edward Warde | Member for Flemington; 1925–1943 | Abolished |
| Preceded by Jack Mullens | Member for Footscray; 1943–1955 | Succeeded by Roy Schintler |
| New seat | Member for Flemington; 1955 | Succeeded by Kevin Holland |
