= Athol Cooper =

English-born Australian politician

Athol Scott Cooper (24 October 1892 – 21 December 1970) was an English-born Australian politician.

He was born in London to clothier Charles Henry Cooper and Mary Esther Scott. He migrated to Australia around 1910 and served with the Australian Imperial Force during World War I. At around 1922 he married Dorothy Jean Holmes, with whom he had two daughters. He became a farmer, first in New South Wales and then in the Mallee. In 1932 he was elected to the Victorian Legislative Assembly as the United Australia Party member for Dundas, but the narrowness of the result prompted a recount which Cooper lost, and his period as an MP ended. He later moved to Dandenong, and died in Mitcham in 1970.

Victorian Legislative Assembly
Preceded by Bill Slater	Member for Dundas; 1932	Succeeded by Bill Slater
