= Isaac Weaver =

Australian politician

Isaac Job Weaver (28 October 1869 – 17 May 1954) was an Australian politician.

He was born in Warrenheip to farmer Edward Weaver and Ellenor Southerton. His formal education lasted two years, and growing up he worked on the family farm at Boort. He became a sheep and wheat farmer, and was active in local agricultural circles. Around 1897, he married Margaret Ritchie, with whom he had two children. In 1917 he was elected to the Victorian Legislative Assembly for Korong, representing the Victorian Farmers' Union. He joined the Country Party in 1920 and was a member of its central council from 1920 to 1922 and from 1928 to 1933. In 1927, his seat was abolished, and he was defeated whilst running for Korong and Eaglehawk. He ran unsuccessfully for the Shire of Gordon in the 1931 Victorian local elections, receiving 35.9% of the vote. From 1938 to 1943, he was a member of John McEwen's Liberal Country Party. Weaver died in Mansfield in 1954.

Victorian Legislative Assembly
Preceded by Achilles Gray	Member for Korong; 1917–1927	Abolished
