= William McDonald (Australian politician) =

Australian politician (1911–1995)

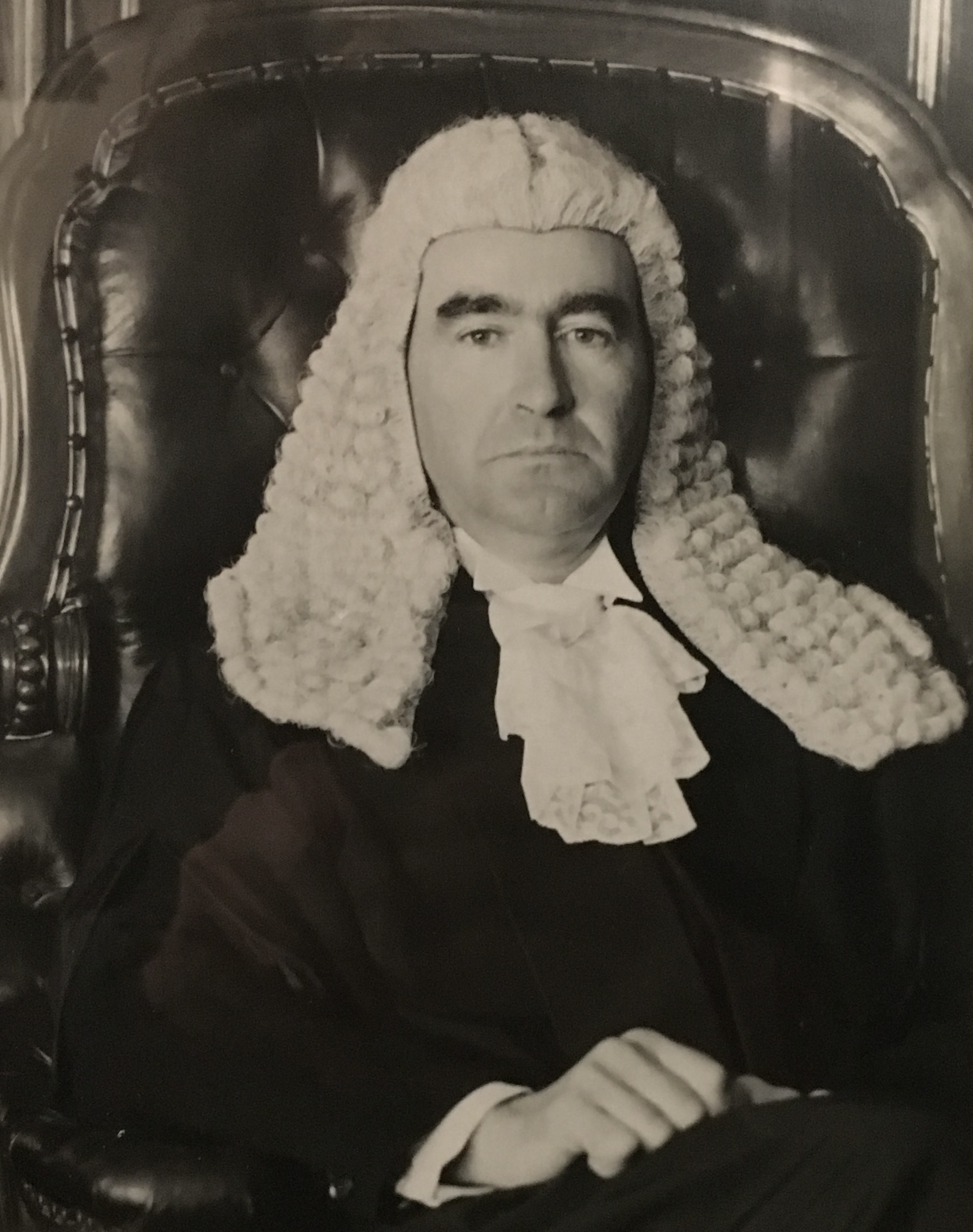
W.J.F. McDonald.

Sir William John Farquhar "Black Jack" McDonald (3 October 1911 – 13 September 1995) was an Australian politician.

He was born at Binnum in South Australia to grazier John Nicholson McDonald and Sarah McInnes, and attended the local state school and then Scotch College in Adelaide. He was a grazier in South Australia from 1930, moving to a sheep station near Neuarpurr in Victoria in 1935. On 15 August 1935 he married Evelyn Margaret Koch, with whom he had two daughters. He served with the AIF in World War II, and after his return served on Kowree Shire Council from 1946 to 1961 (president 1948–49). A member of the Liberal and Country Party, he was elected to the Victorian Legislative Assembly in 1947 for Dundas. Defeated in 1952, he was re-elected in 1955 and elected Speaker. Knighted in 1958, he resigned the speakership in 1967 to become Minister of Lands, Soldier Settlement and Conservation. McDonald lost his seat in 1970. He sold his station in 1980 and retired to Melbourne. He died in 1995.

Victorian Legislative Assembly
| Preceded by Keith Sutton | Speaker of the Victorian Legislative Assembly; 1955–1967 | Succeeded by Vernon Christie |
| Preceded by Bill Slater | Member for Dundas; 1947–1952 | Succeeded by Bob McClure |
| Preceded by Bob McClure | Member for Dundas; 1955–1970 | Succeeded by Edward Lewis |
