= Edward Lewis (Australian politician) =

Australian politician

Edward Wallace Lewis (born 24 December 1936) is an Australian politician.

Lewis was born in Sydney, and was a shearer and farmer before entering politics. He travelled widely before settling in Hamilton around 1963, becoming secretary of the local branch of the Australian Workers' Union and president of the Hamilton Labor Party branch. In 1970 he was elected to the Victorian Legislative Assembly as the member for Dundas, but he was defeated in 1973.

After politics, Lewis farmed at Eualameet North, New South Wales and Foster, Victoria.

Victorian Legislative Assembly
Preceded by Sir William McDonald	Member for Dundas; 1970–1973	Succeeded by Bruce Chamberlain
