= Bob McClure (politician) =

Australian politician

John Robert McClure (10 February 1913 – 6 July 1983) was an Australian politician.

McClure was born in Connewirricoo to farmer John Thomas McClure and Mary McDonnell. He attended state school and after the depression saw his family lose their farm was an shearer around Victoria, South Australia and New South Wales. He eventually acquired a farm at Harrow and on 4 September 1937 married Winifred Emily Haylock, with whom he had two children.

On 6 December 1952 McClure was elected to the Victorian Legislative Assembly as the Labor member for Dundas, but he was defeated on 27 May 1955. He was subsequently an executive member of the Australian Workers' Union and local agent 1956–1983. McClure died at Harrow in 1983.

Victorian Legislative Assembly
Preceded by William McDonald	Member for Dundas; 1952–1955	Succeeded by William McDonald
