= Kevin Holland (Australian politician) =

Australian politician

Kevin Holland AM

Member of the Victorian Legislative Assembly for Flemington
- In office 1956–1967
- Preceded by: Jack Holland
- Succeeded by: Seat abolished

Member of Melbourne City Council
- In office 1951–1975

Commissioner, Keilor City
- In office 1975–1980

Commissioner, Melbourne and Metropolitan Board of Works

Personal details
- Born: Kevin Myles Stephen Holland; 30 March 1910 North Melbourne, Victoria, Australia
- Died: 12 October 1996 (aged 86)
- Party: Labor
- Spouse: Annie Catherine Sheila Duffy (m. 1964; death 1996)
- Occupation: Health inspector

Military service
- Branch/service: Australian Army
- Years of service: 1939–1945
- Unit: Royal Australian Army Medical Corps
- Battles/wars: World War II; Pacific War

Kevin Myles Stephen Holland AM (30 March 1910 – 12 October 1996) was an Australian politician.

== Early life and education ==
He was born in North Melbourne, Victoria on 30 March 1910 to Jack Holland and Agnes Mary Ryan. He attended Catholic schools and became a health inspector with the Victorian Health Department. During World War II he served in the Army Medical Corps in the Pacific War.

== Career ==
He was a delegate with the Miscellaneous Workers' Union and served as a Labor member of Melbourne City Council from 1951 to 1975, leading the party on council from 1955. In 1956 he was elected to the Victorian Legislative Assembly in a by-election to succeed his father in the seat of Flemington. He held the seat until its abolition in 1967, when he retired from the Assembly. From 1975 to 1980 he was on the Keilor City commission, and was commissioner of the Melbourne and Metropolitan Board of Works.

He was appointed a member of the Order of Australia in 1983.

== Death ==
Holland died on 12 October 1996.

== Personal life ==
On 15 January 1964 he had married Annie Catherine Sheila Duffy. Holland died in 1996.

Victorian Legislative Assembly
Preceded by Jack Holland	Member for Flemington; 1956–1967	Abolished
