= Charles Myles Officer =

Australian grazier and politician

Charles Myles Officer (14 July 1827 – 1 February 1904) was an Australian grazier and politician, member of the Victorian Legislative Assembly.

Officer, born at New Norfolk, Tasmania, was the third son of Sir Robert Officer. In 1848 he went to Port Phillip, now Victoria (Australia), where he engaged in pastoral pursuits at Mount Talbot, in the Wimmera district. He was returned to the Assembly for Dundas in 1880, and represented the constituency in the moderate Conservative interest until April 1892. He married first, in 1854, Christina Susannah, daughter of Daniel Robertson, of Launceston, Tasmania; and secondly, in 1876, Ellen Agnes, second daughter of the late Thomas Pope Besnard, of Inverell, New South Wales.

Officer suffered losses from drought on his West Darling properties; he was declared bankrupt in New South Wales on 25 June 1897.
