= Achilles Gray =

Australian politician

Achilles Gray (7 January 1864 – 2 July 1954) was an Australian politician.

He was born in Wedderburn to American-born grazier Joshua Rogers Gray and Eliza Ferguson Donald. He worked on the family property, but also worked as a veterinary surgeon. Around 1884 he married Sarah Crisp, with whom he had four daughters and one son called Meleager Gray.

Gray served on Korong Shire Council from 1901 to 1946, and was president five times (1908–1910, 1912–1913, 1925–1926, 1934–1935, 1940–1941). At a by-election in June 1914, he was elected to the Victorian Legislative Assembly as the Liberal member for Korong. He was re-elected at the state election in November 1914, but was defeated in 1917. He died in Inglewood in 1954.

Victorian Legislative Assembly
Preceded by Thomas Langdon	Member for Korong; 1914–1917	Succeeded by Isaac Weaver
