= John Thomson (Victorian politician) =

Australian politician (1853–1917)

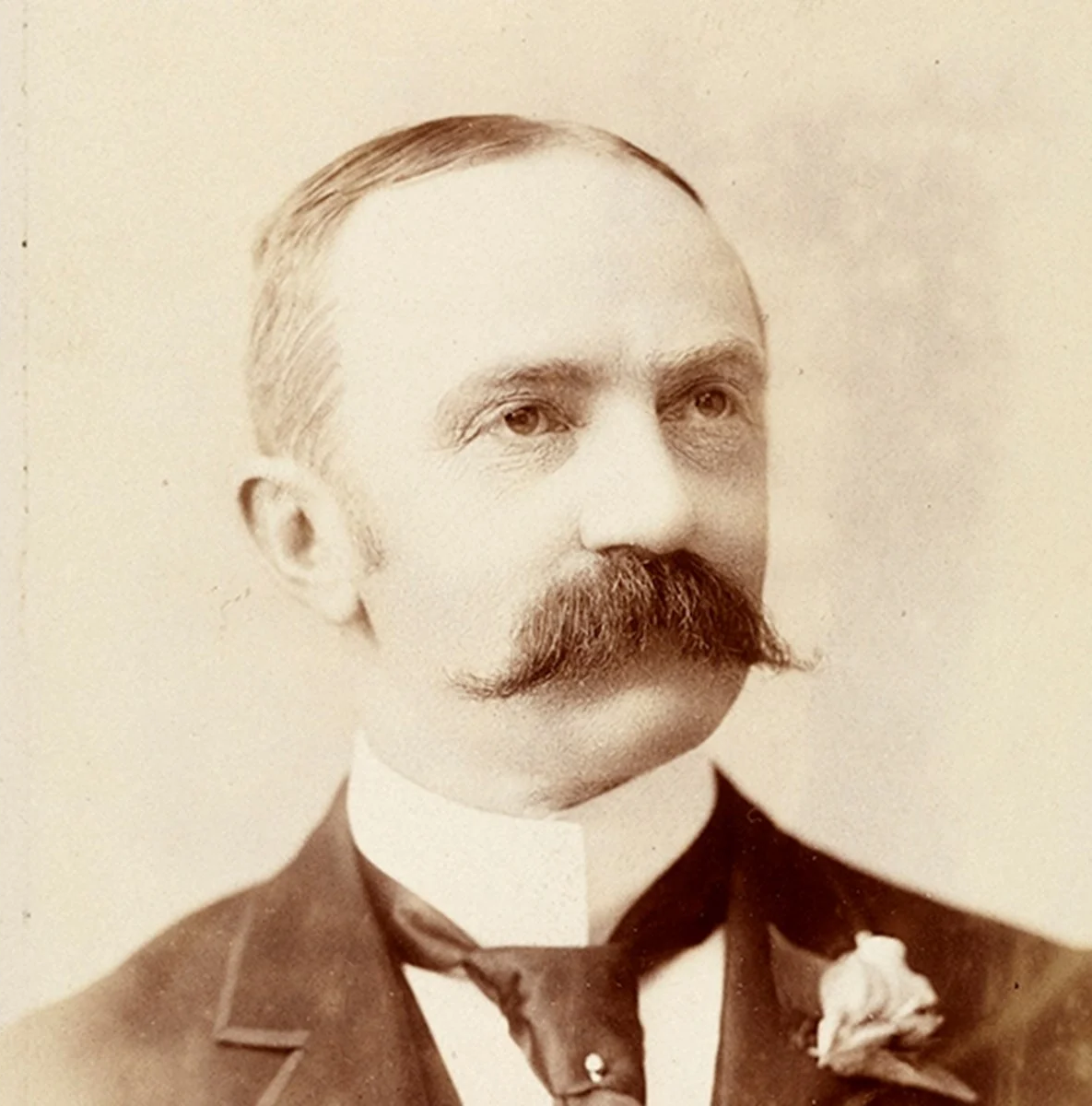

Minister without office
- In office 8 January 1909 – 9 December 1913
- Premier: John Murray; WIlliam Watt

Member of the Victorian Legislative Assembly for Dundas
- In office 18 August 1892 – 1 November 1900
- Preceded by: Samuel Samuel
- Succeeded by: Arthur Robinson
- In office 1 November 1902 – 26 November 1914
- Preceded by: Arthur Robinson
- Succeeded by: William Kennedy Smith

Personal details
- Born: August 23, 1853 Shelford, Victoria
- Died: August 3, 1917 (aged 63) Melbourne, Victoria, Australia
- Party: Commonwealth Liberal

John "Jack" Thomson (23 August 1853 – 3 August 1917) was an Australian politician who served as a member of the Victorian Legislative Assembly.

== Biography ==
Thomson was born in Shelford, Victoria and educated at Scotch College, Melbourne.

He served as a councillor in the Shire of Dundas for fifteen years before being elected to the Victorian Legislative Assembly at the 1892 Dundas colonial by-election for the Electoral district of Dundas following the death of Samuel Samuel. He had previously stood for the seat at the 1892 colonial election. He was defeated at the 1900 Victorian colonial election as part of the Ministerialist faction. He was elected to the same seat at the 1902 Victorian state election.

Throughout his second time in parliament, he served as Minister without portfolio in the Murray ministry and the First Watt ministry. He was a member of the Commonwealth Liberal Party. He did not contest the 1914 Victorian state election.

He married Christina Robertson in 1909. He died on 3 August 1917 at 63 from heart disease.
