= William Kennedy Smith (Australian politician) =

Australian politician (1888–1933)

William Kennedy Smith (16 March 1888 – 10 April 1933) was an Australian politician.

He was born in Dundee to storeman James Crockett Smith and Annie Don. He studied at Scotch College and at the University of Melbourne, where he graduated with a Bachelor of Arts in 1909. He became an agent and organiser, and in 1914 was elected to the Victorian Legislative Assembly for Dundas. He served in the Australian Imperial Force from 1915 to 1918, and was wounded at the Battle of Polygon Wood in 1917. While on active duty, he was defeated at the 1917 state election, and on his return after the war worked as an assistant censor and then as a school teacher in New South Wales. On 4 July 1921, he married fellow teacher Flora Walker, née McLellan; they had three children. Smith's health declined due to his war injuries and in 1931 he retired. He died in Croydon in 1933.

Victorian Legislative Assembly
Preceded by John Thomson	Member for Dundas; 1914–1917	Succeeded by Bill Slater
