= Thomas Langdon (Victorian politician) =

Australian politician

Thomas Langdon MP

Member of the Victorian Legislative Assembly for Korong
- In office 1 May 1892 – 1 May 1914
- Preceded by: Robert Calvert
- Succeeded by: Achilles Gray

Member of the Victorian Legislative Assembly for Avoca
- In office 1 May 1892 – 1 May 1914
- Preceded by: Benjamin George Davies
- Succeeded by: Seat abolished

Chief Secretary of Victoria
- In office 4 January 1907 – 27 February 1907

Minister for Labour
- In office 4 January 1907 – 27 February 1907

Minister without portfolio
- In office 16 February 1904 – 4 January 1907

Personal details
- Born: Thomas Langdon; 13 May 1832 Somerset, England
- Died: 27 May 1914 (aged 82) Albert Park, Australia
- Party: Liberal (1909−1914)
- Other political affiliations: Ministerialist (until 1902; 1904−1907); Reform League (1902−1904); United Liberal (1907−1908); Liberal (1908–1909)
- Spouse(s): Esther Mary Temlett (m. 1855; died 1860) Sarah Ann Coventry (m. 1862)

Thomas Langdon (13 May 1832 − 27 May 1914) was an Australian politician.

== Biography ==
Langdon was born in Somerset, England, and arrived in Melbourne in 1853.

He elected as a member of the Marong Shire Council in 1871, serving as president from 1877 until 1879. He also served on Swan Hill Shire Council.

In 1880, Langdon was elected to the Victorian Legislative Assembly as the member for Avoca. When the seat was abolished in 1889, he attempted to win the new seat of Korong, but was unsuccessful. He also unsuccessfully contested Dunolly at a by-election the following year.

At the 1892 election, Langdon contested Korong again, and this time was successful. Langdon joined the Bent ministry in 1907. This meant a by-election had to be held in his seat, however he contested and was re-elected. Langdon left Bent's United Liberal Party in 1908, joining the Liberal Party.

Langdon died in 1914, aged 82. The by-election in Korong was won by Achilles Gray.

Victorian Legislative Assembly
Preceded by Robert Calvert	Member for Korong; 1892–1914	Succeeded by Achilles Gray
