= Edward Warde =

Australian politician

Edward Coughlan Warde (c. 1862 – 10 November 1925) was an Australian politician.

He was born in Ballarat to actor Cornelius Warde and Margaret Loftus. He was a cabinetmaker, a nine-year president of the Furniture Trades Union, and president of the Eight Hours Anniversary Committee. He married Harriett Jane Norris, with whom he had two children.

In 1900 he was elected to the Victorian Legislative Assembly as the Labor member for Essendon and Flemington, transferring to Flemington in 1904. He was renowned as an orator and debater in parliament, though he never held ministerial office, and was known as a political moderate. Warde served on the Railways Standing Committee for twelve years. He died in office at Flemington in 1925.

Victorian Legislative Assembly
Preceded by Alfred Deakin	Member for Essendon and Flemington; 1900–1904	Abolished
New seat	Member for Flemington; 1904–1925	Succeeded by Jack Holland
