= Electoral district of Dundas (Victoria) =

Former state electoral district of Victoria, Australia

Coordinates: 37°30′S 141°45′E

Dundas Victoria—Legislative Assembly
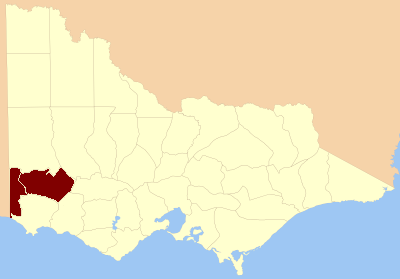
- Dundas. c.1860
- State: Victoria
- Created: 1856
- Abolished: 1976
- Namesake: Dundas and Follett
- Demographic: Rural

Dundas (called Dundas and Follett 1856–59) was an electoral district of the Legislative Assembly in the Australian state of Victoria from 1856 to 1976. It covered a region of western Victoria and consisted of the counties of Dundas and Follett.

The district of Dundas and Follett was one of the initial districts created in the first Victorian Legislative Assembly, 1856. It was renamed Dundas from 1859 as a result of the Electoral Act (of December 1858) although it covered the same area as Dundas and Follett previously.

Later its borders were re-arranged somewhat and included the sub-divisions of Harrow, Casterton, Hamilton, Branxholme, Penshurst and Mortlake.

== Members ==
Member	Party	Term
Charles Griffith		1856–1858
William Mollison		1858–1864
George Fairbairn		1864–1865
John Alexander MacPherson		1866–1878
John Serjeant		1878–1880
Charles Myles Officer		1880–1892
Samuel Samuel		1892–1892
John Thomson		1892–1900
Arthur Robinson		1900–1902
John Thomson	Anti-Socialist	1902–1909
John Thomson	Liberal	1909–1914
William Kennedy Smith	Liberal	1914–1917
William Kennedy Smith	Nationalist	1917–1917
Bill Slater	Labor	1917–1932
Athol Cooper	United Australia	1932–1932
Bill Slater	Labor	1932–1947
William McDonald	Liberal	1947–1952
Bob McClure	Labor	1952–1955
(Sir) William McDonald	Liberal	1955–1970
Edward Lewis	Labor	1970–1973
Bruce Chamberlain	Liberal	1973–1976
