= Electoral district of Flemington =

State electoral district of Victoria, Australia (1955–1967)

Coordinates: 37°47′05″S 144°55′40″E

Flemington Victoria—Legislative Assembly
- State: Victoria
- Dates current: 1904–1945, 1955–1967
- Namesake: suburb of Flemington
- Demographic: Metropolitan

Flemington was an electoral district of the Victorian Legislative Assembly. It was created in 1904 with the abolition of Essendon and Flemington. The new seat was won by the former Labor member for the abolished seat, Edward Warde.

Flemington was abolished in 1945 when several new districts were created, including Moonee Ponds. Flemington was created again in 1955 but was abolished once more in 1967, with its territory being incorporated into Essendon.

== Members ==
First incarnation 1904–1945
Member	Party	Term
Edward Warde	Labor	1904–1925
Jack Holland	Labor	1925–1945

Second incarnation 1955–1967
Member	Party	Term
Jack Holland	Labor	1955
Kevin Holland	Labor	1956–1967
