= 1911 Victorian state election =

Australian state election

← 1908	16 November 1911	1914 →

All 65 seats in the Victorian Legislative Assembly 33 seats needed for a majority
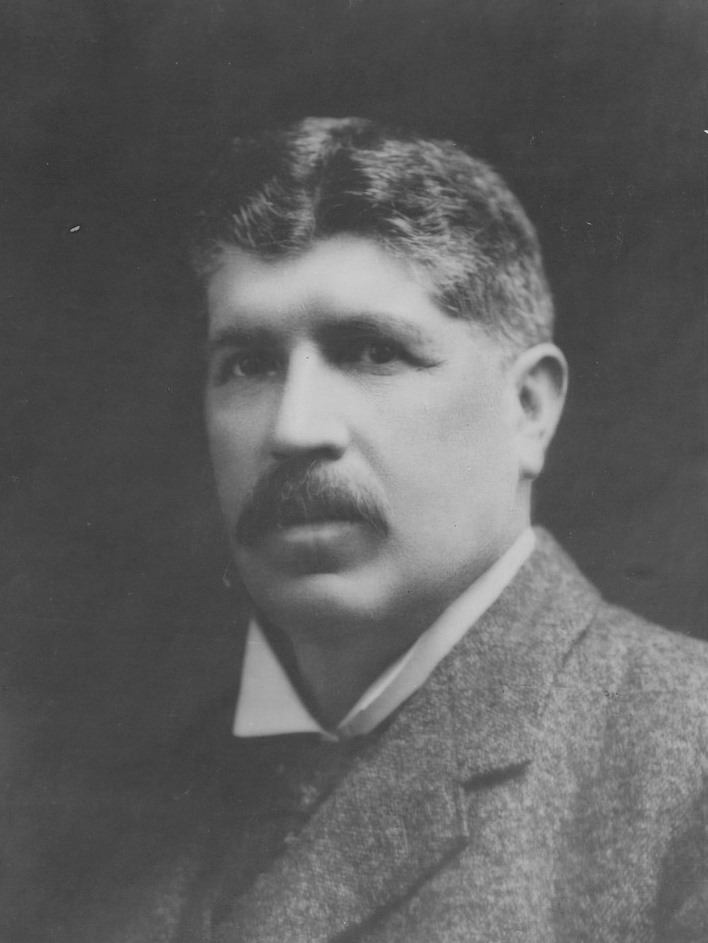

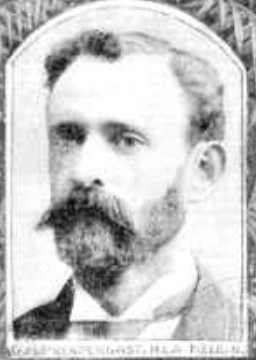
	First party	Third party
Leader	John Murray	George Prendergast
Party	Liberal	Labor
Leader since	January 1909	1904
Leader's seat	Allandale	North Melbourne
Last election	19 seats	21 seats
Seats won	43 seats	20 seats
Seat change	▲24	▼1
Swing	▲18.09%	▲8.28%
Premier before election
John Murray
Liberal
Elected Premier
John Murray
Liberal

The 1911 Victorian state election was held in the Australian state of Victoria on Thursday, 16 November 1911 to elect 56 of the 65 members of the state's Legislative Assembly. Nine seats were uncontested.

The election was in single-member electorates, using preferential voting for the first time in the state's history. Women also voted for the first time at this election.

== Results ==
=== Legislative Assembly ===
Victorian state election, 16 November 1911 Legislative Assembly << 1908–1914 >>
Enrolled voters	711,451				
Votes cast	394,189		Turnout	55.41	+21.76
Informal votes	5,364		Informal	1.36	+0.83
Summary of votes by party
Party	Primary votes	%	Swing	Seats	Change
Liberal	181,249	46.61	+18.09	44	+3
Labor	167,422	43.06	+8.28	19	–2
Independent	40,154	10.33	+0.43	2	–1
Total	388,825			65	

== See also ==
- Candidates of the 1911 Victorian state election
- Members of the Victorian Legislative Assembly, 1911–1914
