= 1914 Victorian state election =

Australian state election

- 26 November 1914

49 (of the 65) seats in the Victorian Legislative Assembly 33 seats needed for a majority
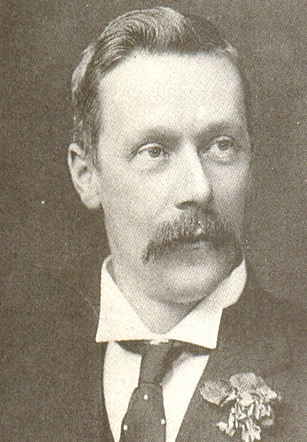

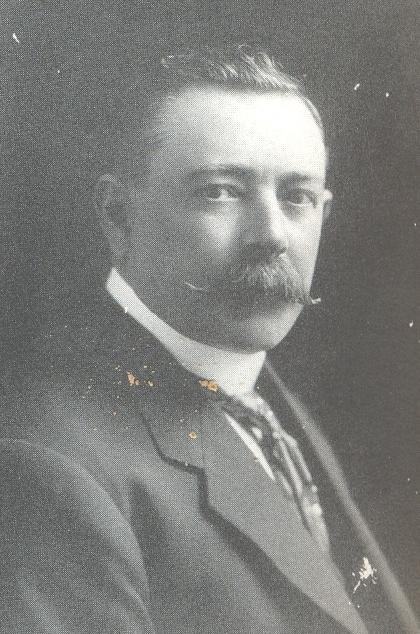
	First party	Second party
Leader	Alexander Peacock	George Elmslie
Party	Democratic Liberal	Labor
Leader since	June 1914	September 1913
Leader's seat	Allandale	Albert Park
Last election	43 seats	20 seats
Seats won	43 seats	22 seats
Seat change	0	▲2
Percentage	56.89%	39.29%
Swing	▲4.86	▼3.48
Premier before election
Alexander Peacock
Democratic Liberal
Elected Premier
Alexander Peacock
Democratic Liberal

The 1914 Victorian state election was held in the Australian state of Victoria on Thursday, 26 November 1914 to elect 49 of the 65 members of the state's Legislative Assembly.

== Background ==
Politics in the state of Victoria in the previous decade had been a 3-way contest between the Conservative, Liberal and Labor parties. Following the example of the federal party, the Conservative and Liberal factions in Victoria united to form the Liberal Party. This new party dominated politics in the state, forming government with a majority of 43 of 65 seats in the previous election, although a new divide formed between city and rural based MPs.

This divide resulted in a no confidence motion being passed to the government of William Watt, when the rural based Liberal MPs and the opposition Labor MPs defeated the government in December 1913. To much surprise, Governor John Madden appointed the opposition Labor party under George Elmslie to government, although it was impossible to retain its position due to its minority in numbers, and that the law at the time stated that new ministers had to recontest their seats at by-elections.

Watt returned as Premier on 22 December 1913, and remained until he resigned in June 1914 to enter Federal politics. He was replaced by former Premier Alexander Peacock. A month later, World War I broke out. Peacock's administration enthusiastically contributed to the war, and was seeking reelection on this basis.

== Results ==
=== Legislative Assembly ===
Victorian state election, 26 November 1914 Legislative Assembly << 1911–1917 >>
Enrolled voters	810,026				
Votes cast	319,950		Turnout	39.50	–15.90
Informal votes	7,294		Informal	2.27	+0.91
Summary of votes by party
Party	Primary votes	%	Swing	Seats	Change
Liberal	167,112	53.44	+6.83	42	– 2
Labor	121,562	38.88	–4.18	21	+ 2
Independent	24,022	7.68	–2.65	2	± 0
Total	312,696			65	

Notes:

- Sixteen seats were uncontested at this election, and were retained by the incumbent parties:
  - Liberal (7): Allandale, Borung, Dandenong, Gippsland South, Gippsland West, Gunbower, Lowan,
  - Labor (9): Abbotsford, Albert Park, Carlton, Collingwood, Fitzroy, Flemington, Geelong, Port Melbourne, Williamstown

== See also ==
- Members of the Victorian Legislative Assembly, 1914–1917
- Candidates of the 1914 Victorian state election
