= Electoral district of Korong =

Former state electoral district in Victoria, Australia

Coordinates: 36°20′S 143°45′E

Korong Victoria—Legislative Assembly
- State: Victoria
- Dates current: 1889–1927, 1945–1955
- Demographic: Rural

The Electoral district of Korong was an electoral district of the Legislative Assembly in the Australian state of Victoria.

It was created by the Electoral Act Amendment Act 1888 (52 Vict. No. 1008 (Vic.)).

The district's area was defined as:

{{quote|"Commencing at the intersection of the Loddon River with the Eaglehawk and Inglewood Railway; thence down the river to the north-east angle of the parish of Leaghur; along the northern and western boundaries of that parish to south-east angle of the parish of Gredgwin; along the south and south-western boundaries of that parish to the south-east angle of the parish of Quambatook; westerly by the south boundary of that parish to the Avoca River; southerly by that river to the Avoca Forest pre-emptive right; north-easterly by the road from Avoca Forest to Inglewood through Wehla to the west boundary of Inglewood borough (as described in the Local Government Act 1874); north, east, and south along the west, north, and east boundaries of the borough to the Eaglehawk and Inglewood Railway line; south-easterly by that line to the commencing point".

== Members for Korong ==
First incarnation (1889–1927)
Member	Party	Term
Robert Calvert	Ministerialist	1889–1892
Thomas Langdon	Ministerialist	1892–1902
Thomas Langdon	Reform League	1902–1904
Thomas Langdon	Ministerialist	1904–1907
Thomas Langdon	United Liberal	1907–1908
Thomas Langdon	Liberal	1908–1909
Thomas Langdon	Liberal	1909–1914
Achilles Gray	Ministerialist	1914–1917
Isaac Weaver	VFU	1917–1920
Isaac Weaver	Country	1920–1927
Second incarnation (1945–1955)
Member	Party	Term
Albert Dunstan	Country	1945–1950
Keith Turnbull	Liberal and Country	1950–1955

== See also ==
- Electoral district of Korong and Eaglehawk
- Electoral district of Eaglehawk
