= Electoral results for the district of Bendigo West =

Victoria, Australia, district election results

This is a list of electoral results for the Electoral district of Bendigo West in Victorian state elections.

== Members for Bendigo West ==
First incarnation (1904–1927)
Member	Party	Term
David Smith	Labor	1904–1914
David Smith	Independent	1914–1917
David Smith	National Labor	1917–1920
David Smith	Nationalist	1920–1924
Arthur Cook	Labor	1924–1927
Second incarnation (1985–present)
Member	Party	Term
David Kennedy	Labor	1985–1992
Max Turner	Liberal	1992–1996
Bob Cameron	Labor	1996–2010
Maree Edwards	Labor	2010–present

== Election results ==
=== Elections in the 2020s ===
2022 Victorian state election: Bendigo West
Party	Candidate	Votes	%	±%
Labor	Maree Edwards	18,704	46.47	−7.01
Liberal	Ken Price	10,057	24.99	−2.10
Greens	James Searle	4,634	11.51	−1.54
Legalise Cannabis	Wayne Taylor	2,175	5.40	+5.40
Family First	Steve Serpell	1,704	4.23	+4.23
Animal Justice	Victoria Maxwell	1,040	2.58	−3.80
Independent	Matt Bansemer	979	2.43	+2.43
Freedom	Richard James Woolley	606	1.51	+1.51
Independent	Marilyn Nuske	349	0.87	+0.87
Total formal votes		40,248	94.47	−0.69
Informal votes		2,401	5.63	+0.69
Turnout		42,649	89.21	−1.95
Two-party-preferred result
Labor	Maree Edwards	25,967	64.35	−4.20
Liberal	Ken Price	14,388	35.65	+4.20
Labor hold		Swing	−4.20	

=== Elections in the 2010s ===
2018 Victorian state election: Bendigo West
Party	Candidate	Votes	%	±%
Labor	Maree Edwards	20,979	53.5	+5.6
Liberal	Kevin Finn	10,636	27.1	−5.2
Greens	Laurie Whelan	5,116	13.0	+1.2
Animal Justice	Marilyn Nuske	2,501	6.4	+6.4
Total formal votes		39,232	95.0	−0.6
Informal votes		2,041	5.0	+0.6
Turnout		41,273	91.1	−2.7
Two-party-preferred result
Labor	Maree Edwards	26,883	68.5	+6.3
Liberal	Kevin Finn	12,339	31.5	−6.3
Labor hold		Swing	+6.3	

2014 Victorian state election: Bendigo West
Party	Candidate	Votes	%	±%
Labor	Maree Edwards	18,247	47.9	+8.2
Liberal	Michael Langdon	12,328	32.3	+12.4
Greens	John Brownstein	4,482	11.8	+1.0
Family First	Amanda Moskalewicz	1,311	3.4	+1.6
Country Alliance	Elise Chapman	1,071	2.8	−0.8
Rise Up Australia	Sandra Caddy	692	1.8	+1.8
Total formal votes		38,131	95.6	+1.0
Informal votes		1,753	4.4	−1.0
Turnout		39,884	93.8	+2.0
Two-party-preferred result
Labor	Maree Edwards	23,702	62.2	+4.0
Liberal	Michael Langdon	14,419	37.8	−4.0
Labor hold		Swing	+4.0	

2010 Victorian state election: Bendigo West
Party	Candidate	Votes	%	±%
Labor	Maree Edwards	14,431	39.34	−9.12
National	Steven Oliver	7,965	21.71	+15.41
Liberal	Anita Donlon	7,343	20.02	−9.16
Greens	Sue-Ellen Radford	3,999	10.90	−0.07
Country Alliance	Trevor Phillips	1,328	3.62	+3.62
Family First	Frances Wintle	671	1.83	−3.25
Democratic Labor	Sandra Caddy	584	1.59	+1.59
Christian Democrats	Anne Foster	361	0.98	+0.98
Total formal votes		36,682	94.52	−1.63
Informal votes		2,127	5.48	+1.63
Turnout		38,809	93.11	+0.22
Two-party-preferred result
Labor	Maree Edwards	19,417	52.93	−7.63
National	Steven Oliver	17,265	47.07	+47.07
Labor hold		Swing	−7.63	

=== Elections in the 2000s ===
2006 Victorian state election: Bendigo West
Party	Candidate	Votes	%	±%
Labor	Bob Cameron	17,120	48.46	−7.97
Liberal	Bruce McClure	10,310	29.18	+6.14
Greens	Sue-Ellen Radford	3,877	10.97	+0.79
National	Glenn Murrells	2,227	6.30	−3.88
Family First	Rachel Harrison	1,796	5.08	+5.08
Total formal votes		35,330	96.15	−1.39
Informal votes		1,413	3.85	+1.39
Turnout		36,743	92.89	−1.05
Two-party-preferred result
Labor	Bob Cameron	21,447	60.56	−5.38
Liberal	Bruce McClure	13,965	39.44	+5.38
Labor hold		Swing	−5.38	

2002 Victorian state election: Bendigo West
Party	Candidate	Votes	%	±%
Labor	Bob Cameron	19,865	56.43	+0.04
Liberal	Geoff Austerberry	8,112	23.04	−12.92
National	Robin Taylor	3,642	10.35	+10.35
Greens	Doug Ralph	3,583	10.18	+5.90
Total formal votes		35,202	97.54	−0.53
Informal votes		888	2.46	+0.53
Turnout		36,090	93.94	−0.86
Two-party-preferred result
Labor	Bob Cameron	23,203	65.94	+4.68
Liberal	Geoff Austerberry	11,986	34.06	−4.68
Labor hold		Swing	+4.68	

=== Elections in the 1990s ===
1999 Victorian state election: Bendigo West
Party	Candidate	Votes	%	±%
Labor	Bob Cameron	18,315	56.4	+12.7
Liberal	Felix Cappy	11,679	36.0	−7.0
Greens	Anne Hall	1,391	4.3	+4.3
Independent	Alan Howard	1,092	3.4	+3.4
Total formal votes		32,477	98.1	−0.4
Informal votes		638	1.9	+0.4
Turnout		33,115	94.8	−0.1
Two-party-preferred result
Labor	Bob Cameron	19,893	61.3	+9.6
Liberal	Felix Cappy	12,582	38.7	−9.6
Labor hold		Swing	+9.6	

1996 Victorian state election: Bendigo West
Party	Candidate	Votes	%	±%
Labor	Bob Cameron	13,849	43.7	−1.8
Liberal	Max Turner	13,632	43.0	+7.3
Independent	Willi Carney	1,936	6.1	+6.1
Independent	Karen Brown	1,153	3.6	+3.6
Shooters	Tom Comini	974	3.1	+3.1
Natural Law	Robert Freethy	152	0.5	+0.5
Total formal votes		31,696	98.5	+0.7
Informal votes		491	1.5	−0.7
Turnout		32,187	94.9	
Two-party-preferred result
Labor	Bob Cameron	16,371	51.7	+2.8
Liberal	Max Turner	15,281	48.3	−2.8
Labor gain from Liberal		Swing	+2.8	

1992 Victorian state election: Bendigo West
Party	Candidate	Votes	%	±%
Labor	David Kennedy	13,763	45.5	−0.1
Liberal	Max Turner	10,788	35.7	+5.3
National	Tony Southcombe	3,995	13.2	−1.2
Independent	Brian Keogh	1,683	5.6	+5.6
Total formal votes		30,229	97.7	+0.3
Informal votes		703	2.3	−0.3
Turnout		30,932	96.1	
Two-party-preferred result
Liberal	Max Turner	15,433	51.1	+2.7
Labor	David Kennedy	14,760	48.9	−2.7
Liberal gain from Labor		Swing	+2.7	

=== Elections in the 1980s ===
1988 Victorian state election: Bendigo West
Party	Candidate	Votes	%	±%
Labor	David Kennedy	13,881	44.97	−8.75
Liberal	William Maltby	9,534	30.89	−1.20
National	Peter McNaught	4,549	14.74	+0.55
Democrats	Peter Shaw-Truex	1,138	3.69	+3.69
Independent	Harold Hall	891	2.89	+2.89
Call to Australia	Graeme Furlong	876	2.84	+2.84
Total formal votes		30,869	97.39	−0.86
Informal votes		828	2.61	+0.86
Turnout		31,697	94.15	−0.80
Two-party-preferred result
Labor	David Kennedy	15,697	50.88	−4.80
Liberal	William Maltby	15,155	49.12	+4.80
Labor hold		Swing	−4.80	

1985 Victorian state election: Bendigo West
Party	Candidate	Votes	%	±%
Labor	David Kennedy	15,687	53.7	+4.0
Liberal	Alexander Sandner	9,371	32.1	−6.0
National	Reginald Holt	4,142	14.2	+9.2
Total formal votes		29,200	98.2	
Informal votes		520	1.8	
Turnout		29,720	95.0	
Two-party-preferred result
Labor	David Kennedy	16,264	55.7	+1.0
Liberal	Alexander Sandner	12,936	44.3	−1.0
Labor hold		Swing	+1.0	

=== Elections in the 1920s ===
1924 Victorian state election: Bendigo West
Party	Candidate	Votes	%	±%
Labor	Arthur Cook	3,425	51.3	+3.9
Nationalist	Edwin Ham	3,247	48.7	−3.9
Total formal votes		6,672	99.1	−0.4
Informal votes		58	0.9	+0.4
Turnout		6,730	74.6	+8.5
Labor gain from Nationalist		Swing	+3.9	

1921 Victorian state election: Bendigo West
Party	Candidate	Votes	%	±%
Nationalist	David Smith	3,259	52.6	+14.1
Labor	Thomas Jude	2,937	47.4	+10.5
Total formal votes		6,196	99.5	+4.2
Informal votes		34	0.5	−4.2
Turnout		6,230	66.1	−5.6
Nationalist hold		Swing	+1.7	

1920 Victorian state election: Bendigo West
Party	Candidate	Votes	%	±%
Nationalist	David Smith	2,408	38.4	−21.4
Labor	Thomas Jude	2,322	37.1	−3.1
Independent	David Andrew	1,537	24.5	+24.5
Total formal votes		6,267	95.3	−2.4
Informal votes		308	4.7	+2.4
Turnout		6,575	71.7	+11.4
Two-party-preferred result
Nationalist	David Smith	3,173	50.9	−8.9
Labor	Thomas Jude	3,058	49.1	+8.9
Nationalist hold		Swing	−8.9	

=== Elections in the 1910s ===
1917 Victorian state election: Bendigo West
Party	Candidate	Votes	%	±%
National Labor	David Smith	3,344	59.8	+26.7
Labor	Arthur Cook	2,244	40.2	+16.9
Total formal votes		5,588	97.2	−0.4
Informal votes		161	2.8	+0.4
Turnout		5,749	60.3	−4.4
National Labor gain from Independent		Swing	N/A	

1914 Victorian state election: Bendigo West
Party	Candidate	Votes	%	±%
Liberal	David Andrew	2,879	43.5	−5.2
Independent	David Smith	2,190	33.1	+33.1
Labor	Arthur Cook	1,543	23.3	−28.0
Total formal votes		6,612	97.6	−0.8
Informal votes		166	2.4	+2.4
Turnout		6,778	64.7	+3.5
Two-candidate-preferred result
Independent	David Smith	3,315	50.1	+50.1
Liberal	David Andrew	3,297	49.9	+1.2
Independent gain from Labor		Swing	N/A	

1911 Victorian state election: Bendigo West
Party	Candidate	Votes	%	±%
Labor	David Smith	3,405	51.3	N/A
Liberal	David Andrew	3,226	48.7	+48.7
Total formal votes		6,631	99.2	
Informal votes		53	0.8	
Turnout		6,684	64.9	
Labor hold		Swing	N/A	
