= Electoral results for the Division of Bendigo =

Australian division election results

This is a list of electoral results for the Division of Bendigo in Australian federal elections from the division's creation in 1901 until the present.

== Members ==
| Member | Party | Results |
|---|---|---|
| Sir John Quick | Protectionist | 1901–1906 |
| Sir John Quick | Ind. Protectionist | 1906–1909 |
| Sir John Quick | Liberal | 1909–1913 |
| John Arthur | Labor | 1913–1914 |
| Alfred Hampson | Labor | 1915 by–1917 |
| Billy Hughes | Nationalist | 1917–1922 |
| Geoffry Hurry | Nationalist | 1922–1929 |
| Richard Keane | Labor | 1929–1931 |
| Eric Harrison | United Australia | 1931–1937 |
| George Rankin | Country | 1937–1949 |
| Percy Clarey | Labor | 1949–1960 |
| Noel Beaton | Labor | 1960 by–1969 |
| David Kennedy | Labor | 1969 by–1972 |
| John Bourchier | Liberal | 1972–1983 |
| John Brumby | Labor | 1983–1990 |
| Bruce Reid | Liberal | 1990–1998 |
| Steve Gibbons | Labor | 1998–2013 |
| Lisa Chesters | Labor | 2013–present |

== Election results ==
=== Elections in the 2020s ===
==== 2025 ====
2025 Australian federal election: Bendigo
| Party | Candidate | Votes | % | ±% |
|---|---|---|---|---|
| Labor | Lisa Chesters | 35,771 | 33.55 | −8.56 |
| National | Andrew Lethlean | 31,707 | 29.74 | +28.84 |
| Greens | Avery Barnett-Dacey | 12,079 | 11.33 | −2.42 |
| Liberal | Matt Evans | 11,176 | 10.48 | −15.90 |
| One Nation | Heather Freeman | 5,262 | 4.94 | −0.61 |
| Legalise Cannabis | Wayne Taylor | 3,666 | 3.44 | +3.44 |
| Family First | Evelyn Keetelaar | 3,153 | 2.96 | +2.96 |
| Victorian Socialists | Rohan Tyler | 1,708 | 1.60 | +1.60 |
| Independent | David Vincent | 1,121 | 1.05 | +1.05 |
| Libertarian | Matt Bansemer | 974 | 0.91 | −2.02 |
| Total formal votes | | 106,617 | 94.48 | −1.74 |
| Informal votes | | 6,228 | 5.52 | +1.74 |
| Turnout | | 112,845 | 93.97 | +2.52 |
Two-party-preferred result
| Labor | Lisa Chesters | 54,800 | 51.40 | −9.81 |
| National | Andrew Lethlean | 51,817 | 48.60 | +48.60 |
| Labor hold | | | | |

==== 2022 ====
2022 Australian federal election: Bendigo
| Party | Candidate | Votes | % | ±% |
|---|---|---|---|---|
| Labor | Lisa Chesters | 42,883 | 42.98 | −0.63 |
| Liberal | Darin Schade | 26,576 | 26.63 | −5.15 |
| Greens | Cate Sinclair | 14,026 | 14.06 | +3.15 |
| One Nation | Ben Mihail | 5,508 | 5.52 | −0.72 |
| Independent | James Laurie | 4,319 | 4.33 | +4.33 |
| United Australia | Elijah Suares | 3,579 | 3.59 | −0.74 |
| Liberal Democrats | Matt Bansemer | 2,888 | 2.89 | +2.89 |
| Total formal votes | | 99,779 | 96.36 | +0.46 |
| Informal votes | | 3,764 | 3.64 | −0.46 |
| Turnout | | 103,543 | 92.16 | −2.15 |
Two-party-preferred result
| Labor | Lisa Chesters | 61,968 | 62.11 | +3.26 |
| Liberal | Darin Schade | 37,811 | 37.89 | −3.26 |
| Labor hold | | Swing | +3.26 | |

Alluvial diagram for preference flows in the seat of Bendigo in the 2022 federal election. indicates at what stage the winning candidate had over 50% of the votes and was declared the winner.

=== Elections in the 2010s ===
==== 2019 ====
2019 Australian federal election: Bendigo
| Party | Candidate | Votes | % | ±% |
|---|---|---|---|---|
| Labor | Lisa Chesters | 44,340 | 43.62 | +5.06 |
| Liberal | Sam Gayed | 32,210 | 31.68 | −6.06 |
| Greens | Robert Holian | 11,381 | 11.20 | +0.29 |
| One Nation | Vaughan Williams | 6,278 | 6.18 | +6.18 |
| United Australia | Adam Veitch | 4,321 | 4.25 | +4.25 |
| Conservative National | Julie Hoskin | 1,667 | 1.64 | +1.64 |
| Rise Up Australia | Sharon Budde | 1,464 | 1.44 | −0.70 |
| Total formal votes | | 101,661 | 95.93 | +0.55 |
| Informal votes | | 4,318 | 4.07 | −0.55 |
| Turnout | | 105,979 | 93.99 | +0.51 |
Two-party-preferred result
| Labor | Lisa Chesters | 60,016 | 59.04 | +5.17 |
| Liberal | Sam Gayed | 41,645 | 40.96 | −5.17 |
| Labor hold | | Swing | +5.17 | |

==== 2016 ====
2016 Australian federal election: Bendigo
| Party | Candidate | Votes | % | ±% |
|---|---|---|---|---|
| Labor | Lisa Chesters | 37,396 | 38.35 | +1.79 |
| Liberal | Megan Purcell | 36,956 | 37.90 | −1.77 |
| Greens | Rosemary Glaisher | 10,749 | 11.02 | +1.72 |
| National | Andy Maddison | 3,544 | 3.63 | −1.39 |
| Family First | Alan Howard | 2,732 | 2.80 | +1.68 |
| Animal Justice | Ruth Parramore | 2,146 | 2.20 | +2.20 |
| Rise Up Australia | Sandy Caddy | 2,058 | 2.11 | +1.57 |
| Independent | Anita Donlon | 1,922 | 1.97 | +1.97 |
| Total formal votes | | 97,503 | 95.40 | +1.11 |
| Informal votes | | 4,705 | 4.60 | −1.11 |
| Turnout | | 102,208 | 93.25 | −2.08 |
Two-party-preferred result
| Labor | Lisa Chesters | 52,398 | 53.74 | +2.48 |
| Liberal | Megan Purcell | 45,105 | 46.26 | −2.48 |
| Labor hold | | Swing | +2.48 | |

==== 2013 ====
2013 Australian federal election: Bendigo
| Party | Candidate | Votes | % | ±% |
|---|---|---|---|---|
| Liberal | Greg Bickley | 36,701 | 39.67 | +3.77 |
| Labor | Lisa Chesters | 33,829 | 36.56 | −10.38 |
| Greens | Lachlan Slade | 8,600 | 9.30 | −3.65 |
| National | Sarah Sheedy | 4,644 | 5.02 | +5.02 |
| Palmer United | Anita Donlon | 2,336 | 2.52 | +2.52 |
| Sex Party | Charlie Crutchfield | 2,220 | 2.40 | +2.40 |
| Family First | Alan Howard | 1,036 | 1.12 | −2.98 |
| Katter's Australian | Stephen Stingel | 745 | 0.81 | +0.81 |
| Christians | Ewan McDonald | 567 | 0.61 | +0.61 |
| Independent | Daniel Abikhair | 545 | 0.59 | +0.59 |
| Country Alliance | Rod Leunig | 538 | 0.58 | +0.58 |
| Rise Up Australia | Sandra Caddy | 499 | 0.54 | +0.54 |
| Independent | Matine Rahmani | 259 | 0.28 | +0.28 |
| Total formal votes | | 92,519 | 94.29 | −2.07 |
| Informal votes | | 5,600 | 5.71 | +2.07 |
| Turnout | | 98,119 | 95.32 | +0.25 |
Two-party-preferred result
| Labor | Lisa Chesters | 47,426 | 51.26 | −8.16 |
| Liberal | Greg Bickley | 45,093 | 48.74 | +8.16 |
| Labor hold | | Swing | −8.16 | |

==== 2010 ====
2010 Australian federal election: Bendigo
| Party | Candidate | Votes | % | ±% |
|---|---|---|---|---|
| Labor | Steve Gibbons | 43,965 | 47.65 | +0.51 |
| Liberal | Craig Hunter | 33,067 | 35.84 | −2.58 |
| Greens | Kymberlie Dimozantos | 11,341 | 12.29 | +5.04 |
| Family First | Alan Howard | 3,892 | 4.22 | +0.67 |
| Total formal votes | | 92,265 | 96.26 | −0.20 |
| Informal votes | | 3,588 | 3.74 | +0.20 |
| Turnout | | 95,853 | 95.19 | −0.84 |
Two-party-preferred result
| Labor | Steve Gibbons | 54,928 | 59.53 | +3.40 |
| Liberal | Craig Hunter | 37,337 | 40.47 | −3.40 |
| Labor hold | | Swing | +3.40 | |

=== Elections in the 2000s ===
==== 2007 ====
2007 Australian federal election: Bendigo
| Party | Candidate | Votes | % | ±% |
|---|---|---|---|---|
| Labor | Steve Gibbons | 42,410 | 47.14 | +3.61 |
| Liberal | Peter Kennedy | 34,562 | 38.42 | −7.02 |
| Greens | Toby Byrne | 6,521 | 7.25 | +0.32 |
| Family First | Terry Jarvis | 3,190 | 3.55 | −0.12 |
| Independent | Eril Rathjen | 1,865 | 2.07 | +2.07 |
| Democrats | Edward Guymer | 577 | 0.64 | +0.64 |
| Independent | Adam Veitch | 331 | 0.37 | +0.37 |
| Independent | Peter Consandine | 304 | 0.34 | +0.34 |
| Liberty & Democracy | Clinton Gale | 210 | 0.23 | +0.23 |
| Total formal votes | | 89,970 | 96.46 | −0.67 |
| Informal votes | | 3,305 | 3.54 | +0.67 |
| Turnout | | 93,275 | 95.96 | −0.24 |
Two-party-preferred result
| Labor | Steve Gibbons | 50,504 | 56.13 | +5.17 |
| Liberal | Peter Kennedy | 39,466 | 43.87 | −5.17 |
| Labor hold | | Swing | +5.17 | |

==== 2004 ====
2004 Australian federal election: Bendigo
| Party | Candidate | Votes | % | ±% |
|---|---|---|---|---|
| Liberal | Kevin Gibbins | 40,035 | 45.44 | +5.92 |
| Labor | Steve Gibbons | 38,356 | 43.53 | +0.04 |
| Greens | David Petersen | 6,108 | 6.93 | +1.29 |
| Family First | Nathan Hulls | 3,238 | 3.67 | +3.67 |
| Citizens Electoral Council | Vern White | 373 | 0.42 | +0.42 |
| Total formal votes | | 88,110 | 97.13 | +0.76 |
| Informal votes | | 2,599 | 2.87 | −0.76 |
| Turnout | | 90,709 | 96.20 | −0.22 |
Two-party-preferred result
| Labor | Steve Gibbons | 44,900 | 50.96 | −2.59 |
| Liberal | Kevin Gibbins | 43,210 | 49.04 | +2.59 |
| Labor hold | | Swing | −2.59 | |

==== 2001 ====
2001 Australian federal election: Bendigo
| Party | Candidate | Votes | % | ±% |
|---|---|---|---|---|
| Labor | Steve Gibbons | 35,630 | 43.48 | +0.58 |
| Liberal | Maurie Sharkey | 32,311 | 39.43 | +3.55 |
| Greens | Bruce Rivendell | 4,279 | 5.22 | +2.56 |
| Democrats | Helen Lilley | 2,620 | 3.20 | −1.33 |
| One Nation | Neil Smith | 2,039 | 2.49 | −4.12 |
| Christian Democrats | Phil Arnold | 1,857 | 2.27 | +2.27 |
| Independent | Karel Zegers | 1,387 | 1.69 | +1.69 |
| Independent | John Pasquarelli | 1,073 | 1.31 | +1.31 |
| | Ron Barrow | 744 | 0.91 | +0.91 |
| Total formal votes | | 81,940 | 96.28 | +0.42 |
| Informal votes | | 3,165 | 3.72 | −0.42 |
| Turnout | | 85,105 | 97.03 | |
Two-party-preferred result
| Labor | Steve Gibbons | 43,892 | 53.57 | +0.10 |
| Liberal | Maurie Sharkey | 38,048 | 46.43 | −0.10 |
| Labor hold | | Swing | +0.10 | |

=== Elections in the 1990s ===
==== 1998 ====
1998 Australian federal election: Bendigo
| Party | Candidate | Votes | % | ±% |
|---|---|---|---|---|
| Labor | Steve Gibbons | 33,483 | 42.91 | +0.09 |
| Liberal | Max Turner | 28,004 | 35.89 | −8.86 |
| One Nation | Karel Zegers | 5,159 | 6.61 | +6.61 |
| Democrats | Alan Tilley | 3,533 | 4.53 | −1.11 |
| National | Scott Mitchell | 2,479 | 3.18 | +3.18 |
| Greens | David Rhys Jones | 2,080 | 2.67 | −0.60 |
| Reform | Alfred Thorpe | 1,108 | 1.42 | +1.42 |
| Independent | Peter Morley | 846 | 1.08 | +1.08 |
| Natural Law | Alan McDonald | 526 | 0.67 | +0.37 |
| Unity | Gayle Maddigan | 361 | 0.46 | +0.46 |
| Australia First | Peter Biggs | 332 | 0.43 | +0.43 |
| Citizens Electoral Council | Lyn Speirs | 126 | 0.16 | +0.16 |
| Total formal votes | | 78,037 | 95.87 | −2.09 |
| Informal votes | | 3,366 | 4.13 | +2.09 |
| Turnout | | 81,403 | 97.01 | +0.08 |
Two-party-preferred result
| Labor | Steve Gibbons | 41,726 | 53.47 | +4.35 |
| Liberal | Max Turner | 36,311 | 46.53 | −4.35 |
| Labor gain from Liberal | | Swing | +4.35 | |

==== 1996 ====
1996 Australian federal election: Bendigo
| Party | Candidate | Votes | % | ±% |
|---|---|---|---|---|
| Liberal | Bruce Reid | 34,703 | 44.75 | +0.08 |
| Labor | Joe Helper | 33,206 | 42.82 | −4.23 |
| Democrats | Don Semmens | 4,371 | 5.64 | +2.43 |
| Greens | Doug Ralph | 2,534 | 3.27 | +3.27 |
| Call to Australia | Pamela Taylor | 1,483 | 1.91 | −0.18 |
| AAFI | John Bulbrook | 1,019 | 1.31 | +1.31 |
| Natural Law | Susan Griffith | 233 | 0.30 | −0.27 |
| Total formal votes | | 77,549 | 97.95 | +0.13 |
| Informal votes | | 1,619 | 2.05 | −0.13 |
| Turnout | | 79,168 | 96.93 | −0.20 |
Two-party-preferred result
| Liberal | Bruce Reid | 39,298 | 50.88 | +2.23 |
| Labor | Joe Helper | 37,938 | 49.12 | −2.23 |
| Liberal hold | | Swing | +2.23 | |

==== 1993 ====
1993 Australian federal election: Bendigo
| Party | Candidate | Votes | % | ±% |
|---|---|---|---|---|
| Labor | Joe Helper | 33,785 | 46.10 | +5.57 |
| Liberal | Bruce Reid | 33,527 | 45.75 | +11.83 |
| Democrats | Don Semmens | 2,198 | 3.00 | −5.00 |
| Call to Australia | Pamela Taylor | 1,717 | 2.34 | +0.07 |
| Independent | Julie Oberin | 1,335 | 1.82 | +1.82 |
| Natural Law | Sharon Hill | 393 | 0.54 | +0.54 |
| | Doug Harrison | 330 | 0.45 | +0.45 |
| Total formal votes | | 73,285 | 97.85 | +0.22 |
| Informal votes | | 1,607 | 2.15 | −0.22 |
| Turnout | | 74,892 | 97.13 | |
Two-party-preferred result
| Liberal | Bruce Reid | 36,677 | 50.07 | −1.08 |
| Labor | Joe Helper | 36,579 | 49.93 | +1.08 |
| Liberal hold | | Swing | −1.08 | |

==== 1990 ====
1990 Australian federal election: Bendigo
| Party | Candidate | Votes | % | ±% |
|---|---|---|---|---|
| Labor | John Brumby | 28,197 | 40.5 | −8.6 |
| Liberal | Bruce Reid | 23,592 | 33.9 | +9.5 |
| National | Denis English | 9,330 | 13.4 | −8.7 |
| Democrats | Ian Keeling | 5,566 | 8.0 | 4.0 |
| Call to Australia | Vic Upson | 1,578 | 2.3 | +2.3 |
| Independent | Joan Ansell | 880 | 1.3 | +1.3 |
| Independent | Russell Castley | 420 | 0.6 | +0.6 |
| Total formal votes | | 69,563 | 97.6 | |
| Informal votes | | 1,684 | 2.4 | |
| Turnout | | 71,247 | 96.7 | |
Two-party-preferred result
| Liberal | Bruce Reid | 35,539 | 51.1 | +5.1 |
| Labor | John Brumby | 33,949 | 48.9 | −5.1 |
| Liberal gain from Labor | | Swing | +5.1 | |

=== Elections in the 1980s ===
==== 1987 ====
1987 Australian federal election: Bendigo
| Party | Candidate | Votes | % | ±% |
|---|---|---|---|---|
| Labor | John Brumby | 32,312 | 48.5 | −0.6 |
| Liberal | John Radford | 16,508 | 24.8 | −11.9 |
| National | Ron Best | 14,703 | 22.1 | +13.2 |
| Democrats | Kaye Swanton | 2,700 | 4.0 | +0.8 |
| Independent | John Somerville | 330 | 0.5 | +0.5 |
| Independent | Sharyne O'Grady | 126 | 0.2 | +0.2 |
| Total formal votes | | 66,679 | 96.2 | |
| Informal votes | | 2,661 | 3.8 | |
| Turnout | | 69,340 | 96.2 | |
Two-party-preferred result
| Labor | John Brumby | 35,677 | 53.5 | +1.4 |
| Liberal | John Radford | 31,046 | 46.5 | −1.4 |
| Labor hold | | Swing | +1.4 | |

==== 1984 ====
1984 Australian federal election: Bendigo
| Party | Candidate | Votes | % | ±% |
|---|---|---|---|---|
| Labor | John Brumby | 31,047 | 49.1 | +1.1 |
| Liberal | Daryl McClure | 23,197 | 36.7 | −8.2 |
| National | Reginald Holt | 5,599 | 8.9 | +6.1 |
| Democrats | Nola Rixon | 2,017 | 3.2 | −1.2 |
| Democratic Labor | Vincent Jordan | 1,361 | 2.2 | −0.4 |
| Total formal votes | | 63,221 | 94.9 | |
| Informal votes | | 3,377 | 5.1 | |
| Turnout | | 66,598 | 96.4 | |
Two-party-preferred result
| Labor | John Brumby | 32,786 | 52.0 | +0.9 |
| Liberal | Daryl McClure | 30,287 | 48.0 | −0.9 |
| Labor hold | | Swing | +0.9 | |

==== 1983 ====
1983 Australian federal election: Bendigo
| Party | Candidate | Votes | % | ±% |
|---|---|---|---|---|
| Labor | John Brumby | 34,908 | 49.7 | +5.7 |
| Liberal | John Bourchier | 30,352 | 43.2 | −4.1 |
| Democrats | Neil Jewell | 3,078 | 4.4 | −4.4 |
| Democratic Labor | Robert Denahy | 1,859 | 2.6 | +2.6 |
| Total formal votes | | 70,197 | 98.6 | |
| Informal votes | | 968 | 1.4 | |
| Turnout | | 71,165 | 96.7 | |
Two-party-preferred result
| Labor | John Brumby | | 52.8 | +4.1 |
| Liberal | John Bourchier | | 47.2 | −4.1 |
| Labor gain from Liberal | | Swing | +4.1 | |

==== 1980 ====
1980 Australian federal election: Bendigo
| Party | Candidate | Votes | % | ±% |
|---|---|---|---|---|
| Liberal | John Bourchier | 31,468 | 47.3 | −0.7 |
| Labor | Victor Dolby | 29,257 | 44.0 | +9.5 |
| Democrats | George Hunter | 5,828 | 8.8 | −3.8 |
| Total formal votes | | 66,553 | 98.6 | |
| Informal votes | | 919 | 1.4 | |
| Turnout | | 67,472 | 96.1 | |
Two-party-preferred result
| Liberal | John Bourchier | 34,122 | 51.3 | −6.9 |
| Labor | Victor Dolby | 32,431 | 48.7 | +6.9 |
| Liberal hold | | Swing | −6.9 | |

=== Elections in the 1970s ===
==== 1977 ====
1977 Australian federal election: Bendigo
| Party | Candidate | Votes | % | ±% |
|---|---|---|---|---|
| Liberal | John Bourchier | 30,072 | 48.0 | −1.3 |
| Labor | Dennis Muldoon | 21,620 | 34.5 | −7.0 |
| Democrats | Ian Price | 7,905 | 12.6 | +12.6 |
| Democratic Labor | Paul Brennan | 3,005 | 4.8 | +0.3 |
| Total formal votes | | 62,602 | 98.1 | |
| Informal votes | | 1,210 | 1.9 | |
| Turnout | | 63,812 | 95.8 | |
Two-party-preferred result
| Liberal | John Bourchier | | 58.5 | +0.8 |
| Labor | Dennis Muldoon | | 41.5 | −0.8 |
| Liberal hold | | Swing | +0.8 | |

==== 1975 ====
1975 Australian federal election: Bendigo
| Party | Candidate | Votes | % | ±% |
|---|---|---|---|---|
| Liberal | John Bourchier | 28,594 | 48.3 | +9.7 |
| Labor | Stewart Anderson | 25,160 | 42.5 | −5.3 |
| Democratic Labor | Paul Brennan | 2,663 | 4.5 | −0.8 |
| National Country | Henry O'Halloran | 2,563 | 4.3 | +4.3 |
| Independent | Leslie Irlam | 263 | 0.4 | +0.4 |
| Total formal votes | | 59,243 | 98.6 | |
| Informal votes | | 812 | 1.4 | |
| Turnout | | 60,055 | 96.4 | |
Two-party-preferred result
| Liberal | John Bourchier | | 56.7 | +5.9 |
| Labor | Stewart Anderson | | 45.3 | −5.9 |
| Liberal hold | | Swing | +5.9 | |

==== 1974 ====
1974 Australian federal election: Bendigo
| Party | Candidate | Votes | % | ±% |
|---|---|---|---|---|
| Labor | David Kennedy | 27,231 | 47.8 | +0.1 |
| Liberal | John Bourchier | 22,014 | 38.6 | +11.9 |
| Independent | Joe Pearce | 4,087 | 7.2 | +7.2 |
| Democratic Labor | Paul Brennan | 3,032 | 5.3 | −3.1 |
| Australia | Robert Stenton | 596 | 1.0 | +1.0 |
| Total formal votes | | 56,960 | 98.5 | |
| Informal votes | | 868 | 1.5 | |
| Turnout | | 57,828 | 96.9 | |
Two-party-preferred result
| Liberal | John Bourchier | 28,922 | 50.8 | +0.6 |
| Labor | David Kennedy | 28,038 | 49.2 | −0.6 |
| Liberal hold | | Swing | +0.6 | |

==== 1972 ====
1972 Australian federal election: Bendigo
| Party | Candidate | Votes | % | ±% |
|---|---|---|---|---|
| Labor | David Kennedy | 24,326 | 47.7 | −3.1 |
| Liberal | John Bourchier | 13,637 | 26.7 | −10.0 |
| Country | Joe Pearce | 8,813 | 17.3 | +17.3 |
| Democratic Labor | Paul Brennan | 4,267 | 8.4 | −4.1 |
| Total formal votes | | 51,043 | 98.8 | |
| Informal votes | | 636 | 1.2 | |
| Turnout | | 51,679 | 96.9 | |
Two-party-preferred result
| Liberal | John Bourchier | 25,604 | 50.2 | +3.2 |
| Labor | David Kennedy | 25,439 | 49.8 | −3.2 |
| Liberal gain from Labor | | Swing | +3.2 | |

=== Elections in the 1960s ===
==== 1969 ====
1969 Australian federal election: Bendigo
| Party | Candidate | Votes | % | ±% |
|---|---|---|---|---|
| Labor | David Kennedy | 24,792 | 50.8 | +0.0 |
| Liberal | Mervyn Lee | 17,897 | 36.7 | +0.0 |
| Democratic Labor | Paul Brennan | 6,102 | 12.5 | +0.1 |
| Total formal votes | | 48,791 | 98.7 | |
| Informal votes | | 622 | 1.3 | |
| Turnout | | 49,413 | 96.9 | |
Two-party-preferred result
| Labor | David Kennedy | | 53.0 | +0.9 |
| Liberal | Mervyn Lee | | 47.0 | −0.9 |
| Labor hold | | Swing | +0.9 | |

==== 1969 by-election ====
Bendigo by-election, 1969
| Party | Candidate | Votes | % | ±% |
|---|---|---|---|---|
| Labor | David Kennedy | 20,011 | 45.3 | −6.4 |
| Liberal | Rodney Cambridge | 15,106 | 34.2 | −1.6 |
| Democratic Labor | Paul Brennan | 5,710 | 12.9 | +0.3 |
| Independent | Lance Hutchinson | 2,750 | 6.2 | +6.2 |
| Independent | Chris Candler | 595 | 1.3 | +1.3 |
| Total formal votes | | 44,172 | 98.5 | |
| Informal votes | | 693 | 1.5 | |
| Turnout | | 44,865 | 93.6 | |
Two-party-preferred result
| Labor | David Kennedy | 22,421 | 50.8 | −2.2 |
| Liberal | Rodney Cambridge | 21,751 | 49.2 | +2.2 |
| Labor hold | | Swing | −2.2 | |

==== 1966 ====
1966 Australian federal election: Bendigo
| Party | Candidate | Votes | % | ±% |
|---|---|---|---|---|
| Labor | Noel Beaton | 23,191 | 51.7 | +0.5 |
| Liberal | Frank Dunphy | 16,062 | 35.8 | +0.7 |
| Democratic Labor | Bill Drechsler | 5,640 | 12.6 | −1.1 |
| Total formal votes | | 44,893 | 98.5 | |
| Informal votes | | 697 | 1.5 | |
| Turnout | | 45,590 | 96.2 | |
Two-party-preferred result
| Labor | Noel Beaton | | 53.0 | +0.4 |
| Liberal | Frank Dunphy | | 47.0 | −0.4 |
| Labor hold | | Swing | +0.4 | |

==== 1963 ====
1963 Australian federal election: Bendigo
| Party | Candidate | Votes | % | ±% |
|---|---|---|---|---|
| Labor | Noel Beaton | 22,646 | 51.2 | −0.4 |
| Liberal | Fred Grimwade | 15,541 | 35.1 | +0.9 |
| Democratic Labor | Bill Drechsler | 6,044 | 13.7 | +0.2 |
| Total formal votes | | 44,231 | 99.3 | |
| Informal votes | | 307 | 0.7 | |
| Turnout | | 44,538 | 96.9 | |
Two-party-preferred result
| Labor | Noel Beaton | | 52.6 | −1.6 |
| Liberal | Fred Grimwade | | 47.4 | +1.6 |
| Labor hold | | Swing | −1.6 | |

==== 1961 ====
1961 Australian federal election: Bendigo
| Party | Candidate | Votes | % | ±% |
|---|---|---|---|---|
| Labor | Noel Beaton | 22,511 | 51.6 | +3.1 |
| Liberal | Henry Snell | 14,928 | 34.2 | −4.2 |
| Democratic Labor | Ronald Anderson | 5,895 | 13.5 | +0.4 |
| Independent | Milan Lorman | 308 | 0.7 | +0.7 |
| Total formal votes | | 43,642 | 98.6 | |
| Informal votes | | 606 | 1.4 | |
| Turnout | | 44,248 | 96.8 | |
Two-party-preferred result
| Labor | Noel Beaton | | 54.2 | +3.9 |
| Liberal | Henry Snell | | 45.8 | −3.9 |
| Labor hold | | Swing | +3.9 | |

==== 1960 by-election ====
Bendigo by-election, 1960
| Party | Candidate | Votes | % | ±% |
|---|---|---|---|---|
| Labor | Noel Beaton | 20,290 | 48.0 | −0.5 |
| Liberal | Henry Snell | 15,773 | 37.3 | −1.1 |
| Democratic Labor | Bill Drechsler | 6,200 | 14.7 | +1.6 |
| Total formal votes | | 42,263 | 99.2 | |
| Informal votes | | 345 | 0.8 | |
| Turnout | | 42,608 | 94.1 | |
Two-party-preferred result
| Labor | Noel Beaton | 21,198 | 50.2 | −0.1 |
| Liberal | Henry Snell | 21,065 | 49.8 | +0.1 |
| Labor hold | | Swing | −0.1 | |

=== Elections in the 1950s ===
==== 1958 ====
1958 Australian federal election: Bendigo
| Party | Candidate | Votes | % | ±% |
|---|---|---|---|---|
| Labor | Percy Clarey | 20,840 | 48.5 | +2.3 |
| Liberal | Henry Snell | 16,471 | 38.4 | −2.0 |
| Democratic Labor | Bill Drechsler | 5,619 | 13.1 | −0.3 |
| Total formal votes | | 42,930 | 98.7 | |
| Informal votes | | 584 | 1.3 | |
| Turnout | | 43,514 | 96.8 | |
Two-party-preferred result
| Labor | Percy Clarey | 21,598 | 50.3 | −0.9 |
| Liberal | Henry Snell | 21,332 | 49.7 | +0.9 |
| Labor hold | | Swing | −0.9 | |

==== 1955 ====
1955 Australian federal election: Bendigo
| Party | Candidate | Votes | % | ±% |
|---|---|---|---|---|
| Labor | Percy Clarey | 19,006 | 46.2 | −8.5 |
| Liberal | Bill Day | 16,637 | 40.4 | −4.9 |
| Labor (A-C) | Jim Brosnan | 5,502 | 13.4 | +13.4 |
| Total formal votes | | 41,145 | 98.4 | |
| Informal votes | | 667 | 1.6 | |
| Turnout | | 41,812 | 95.7 | |
Two-party-preferred result
| Labor | Percy Clarey | 21,075 | 51.2 | −3.5 |
| Liberal | Bill Day | 20,070 | 48.8 | +3.5 |
| Labor hold | | Swing | −3.5 | |

==== 1954 ====
1954 Australian federal election: Bendigo
| Party | Candidate | Votes | % | ±% |
|---|---|---|---|---|
| Labor | Percy Clarey | 23,272 | 55.8 | +2.2 |
| Liberal | John Barton | 18,448 | 44.2 | −2.2 |
| Total formal votes | | 41,720 | 99.2 | |
| Informal votes | | 352 | 0.8 | |
| Turnout | | 42,072 | 96.6 | |
| Labor hold | | Swing | +2.2 | |

==== 1951 ====
1951 Australian federal election: Bendigo
| Party | Candidate | Votes | % | ±% |
|---|---|---|---|---|
| Labor | Percy Clarey | 21,975 | 53.6 | +6.6 |
| Liberal | Charles Carty-Salmon | 18,997 | 46.4 | −1.3 |
| Total formal votes | | 40,972 | 98.8 | |
| Informal votes | | 509 | 1.2 | |
| Turnout | | 41,481 | 96.8 | |
| Labor hold | | Swing | +3.4 | |

=== Elections in the 1940s ===
==== 1949 ====
1949 Australian federal election: Bendigo
| Party | Candidate | Votes | % | ±% |
|---|---|---|---|---|
| Liberal | Thomas Grigg | 19,268 | 47.7 | +24.2 |
| Labor | Percy Clarey | 18,962 | 47.0 | −5.0 |
| Independent | Allan Goodman | 2,134 | 5.3 | +5.3 |
| Total formal votes | | 40,364 | 98.6 | |
| Informal votes | | 554 | 1.4 | |
| Turnout | | 40,918 | 96.5 | |
Two-party-preferred result
| Labor | Percy Clarey | 20,258 | 50.2 | −4.1 |
| Liberal | Thomas Grigg | 20,106 | 49.8 | +4.1 |
| Labor gain from Country | | Swing | 14.1 | |

==== 1946 ====
1946 Australian federal election: Bendigo
| Party | Candidate | Votes | % | ±% |
|---|---|---|---|---|
| Labor | Ernest Duus | 19,613 | 42.9 | +0.1 |
| Country | George Rankin | 15,780 | 34.5 | −10.4 |
| Liberal | Joseph Hall | 10,323 | 22.6 | +22.6 |
| Total formal votes | | 45,716 | 98.6 | |
| Informal votes | | 664 | 1.4 | |
| Turnout | | 46,380 | 95.4 | |
Two-party-preferred result
| Country | George Rankin | 25,172 | 55.1 | +2.8 |
| Labor | Ernest Duus | 20,544 | 44.9 | −2.8 |
| Country hold | | Swing | +2.8 | |

==== 1943 ====
1943 Australian federal election: Bendigo
| Party | Candidate | Votes | % | ±% |
|---|---|---|---|---|
| Country | George Rankin | 20,050 | 44.9 | −4.4 |
| Labor | Bert de Grandi | 19,107 | 42.8 | +4.7 |
| Ind. United Australia | Morton Garner | 2,151 | 4.8 | +4.8 |
| Independent | John Crawford | 2,089 | 4.7 | +4.7 |
| Independent Labor | William Banks | 1,292 | 2.9 | +2.9 |
| Total formal votes | | 44,689 | 97.5 | |
| Informal votes | | 1,169 | 2.5 | |
| Turnout | | 45,858 | 96.7 | |
Two-party-preferred result
| Country | George Rankin | 23,386 | 52.3 | −5.2 |
| Labor | Bert de Grandi | 21,303 | 47.7 | +5.2 |
| Country hold | | Swing | −5.2 | |

==== 1940 ====
1940 Australian federal election: Bendigo
| Party | Candidate | Votes | % | ±% |
|---|---|---|---|---|
| Country | George Rankin | 22,561 | 49.3 | +17.7 |
| Labor | Bert de Grandi | 17,453 | 38.1 | −1.4 |
| Independent Country | John Barton | 5,769 | 12.6 | +12.6 |
| Total formal votes | | 45,783 | 98.6 | |
| Informal votes | | 631 | 1.4 | |
| Turnout | | 46,414 | 95.6 | |
Two-party-preferred result
| Country | George Rankin | 26,314 | 57.5 | +0.6 |
| Labor | Bert de Grandi | 19,469 | 42.5 | −0.6 |
| Country hold | | Swing | +0.6 | |

=== Elections in the 1930s ===
==== 1937 ====
1937 Australian federal election: Bendigo
| Party | Candidate | Votes | % | ±% |
|---|---|---|---|---|
| Labor | Ernest Duus | 18,834 | 39.5 | −0.5 |
| Country | George Rankin | 15,081 | 31.6 | +7.6 |
| United Australia | Walter Pearce | 13,748 | 28.8 | −6.4 |
| Total formal votes | | 47,663 | 98.5 | |
| Informal votes | | 740 | 1.5 | |
| Turnout | | 48,403 | 96.0 | |
Two-party-preferred result
| Country | George Rankin | 27,100 | 56.9 | −0.3 |
| Labor | Ernest Duus | 20,563 | 43.1 | +0.3 |
| Country gain from United Australia | | Swing | −0.3 | |

==== 1934 ====
1934 Australian federal election: Bendigo
| Party | Candidate | Votes | % | ±% |
|---|---|---|---|---|
| United Australia | Eric Harrison | 21,683 | 51.6 | −7.9 |
| Labor | Richard Keane | 20,378 | 48.4 | +7.9 |
| Total formal votes | | 42,061 | 98.8 | |
| Informal votes | | 522 | 1.2 | |
| Turnout | | 42,583 | 95.1 | |
| United Australia hold | | Swing | −7.9 | |

==== 1931 ====
1931 Australian federal election: Bendigo
| Party | Candidate | Votes | % | ±% |
|---|---|---|---|---|
| United Australia | Eric Harrison | 23,710 | 59.5 | +14.6 |
| Labor | Richard Keane | 16,167 | 40.5 | −14.6 |
| Total formal votes | | 39,877 | 98.7 | |
| Informal votes | | 544 | 1.3 | |
| Turnout | | 40,421 | 96.2 | |
| United Australia gain from Labor | | Swing | +14.6 | |

=== Elections in the 1920s ===
==== 1929 ====
1929 Australian federal election: Bendigo
| Party | Candidate | Votes | % | ±% |
|---|---|---|---|---|
| Labor | Richard Keane | 21,111 | 55.1 | +12.7 |
| Nationalist | Geoffry Hurry | 17,177 | 44.9 | +7.3 |
| Total formal votes | | 38,288 | 99.0 | |
| Informal votes | | 390 | 1.0 | |
| Turnout | | 38,678 | 96.6 | |
| Labor gain from Nationalist | | Swing | +8.2 | |

==== 1928 ====
1928 Australian federal election: Bendigo
| Party | Candidate | Votes | % | ±% |
|---|---|---|---|---|
| Labor | James McDonald | 15,849 | 42.4 | −4.1 |
| Nationalist | Geoffry Hurry | 14,074 | 37.6 | −15.9 |
| Country | Cyril James | 7,489 | 20.0 | +20.0 |
| Total formal votes | | 37,412 | 97.8 | |
| Informal votes | | 855 | 2.2 | |
| Turnout | | 38,267 | 95.7 | |
Two-party-preferred result
| Nationalist | Geoffry Hurry | 19,882 | 53.1 | −0.4 |
| Labor | James McDonald | 17,530 | 46.9 | +0.4 |
| Nationalist hold | | Swing | −0.4 | |

==== 1925 ====
1925 Australian federal election: Bendigo
| Party | Candidate | Votes | % | ±% |
|---|---|---|---|---|
| Nationalist | Geoffry Hurry | 20,154 | 53.5 | +21.9 |
| Labor | Thomas Jude | 17,507 | 46.5 | +3.4 |
| Total formal votes | | 37,661 | 98.9 | |
| Informal votes | | 400 | 1.1 | |
| Turnout | | 38,061 | 94.6 | |
| Nationalist hold | | Swing | +1.8 | |

==== 1922 ====
1922 Australian federal election: Bendigo
| Party | Candidate | Votes | % | ±% |
|---|---|---|---|---|
| Labor | Thomas Jude | 10,854 | 43.1 | +0.0 |
| Nationalist | Geoffry Hurry | 7,961 | 31.6 | −10.2 |
| Country | Edmund Jowett | 6,348 | 25.2 | +10.1 |
| Total formal votes | | 25,163 | 96.8 | |
| Informal votes | | 826 | 3.2 | |
| Turnout | | 25,989 | 63.3 | |
Two-party-preferred result
| Nationalist | Geoffry Hurry | 13,016 | 51.7 | −3.8 |
| Labor | Thomas Jude | 12,147 | 48.3 | +3.8 |
| Nationalist hold | | Swing | −3.8 | |

=== Elections in the 1910s ===
==== 1919 ====
1919 Australian federal election: Bendigo
| Party | Candidate | Votes | % | ±% |
|---|---|---|---|---|
| Nationalist | Billy Hughes | 14,291 | 55.0 | −2.4 |
| Labor | Alfred Hampson | 11,676 | 45.0 | +2.4 |
| Total formal votes | | 25,967 | 99.3 | |
| Informal votes | | 186 | 0.7 | |
| Turnout | | 26,153 | 82.8 | |
| Nationalist hold | | Swing | −2.4 | |

==== 1917 ====
1917 Australian federal election: Bendigo
| Party | Candidate | Votes | % | ±% |
|---|---|---|---|---|
| Nationalist | Billy Hughes | 16,272 | 57.4 | +12.5 |
| Labor | Alfred Hampson | 12,091 | 42.6 | −12.5 |
| Total formal votes | | 28,363 | 97.9 | |
| Informal votes | | 618 | 2.1 | |
| Turnout | | 28,981 | 89.7 | |
| Nationalist gain from Labor | | Swing | +12.5 | |

==== 1915 by-election ====
1915 Bendigo by-election
| Party | Candidate | Votes | % | ±% |
|---|---|---|---|---|
| Labor | Alfred Hampson | 12,188 | 50.89 | −4.21 |
| Liberal | William Richards | 11,761 | 49.11 | +4.21 |
| Total formal votes | | 23,949 | 99.17 | +0.87 |
| Informal votes | | 201 | 0.83 | −0.87 |
| Registered electors | | 35,495 | | |
| Turnout | | 24,150 | 68.04 | −4.48 |
| Labor hold | | Swing | −4.21 | |

==== 1914 ====
1914 Australian federal election: Bendigo
| Party | Candidate | Votes | % | ±% |
|---|---|---|---|---|
| Labor | John Arthur | 16,134 | 55.1 | +4.6 |
| Liberal | Frank Maldon Robb | 13,145 | 44.9 | −1.7 |
| Total formal votes | | 29,279 | 99.3 | |
| Informal votes | | 509 | 1.7 | |
| Turnout | | 29,788 | 83.8 | |
| Labor hold | | Swing | +3.1 | |

==== 1913 ====
1913 Australian federal election: Bendigo
| Party | Candidate | Votes | % | ±% |
|---|---|---|---|---|
| Labor | John Arthur | 14,488 | 50.5 | +2.1 |
| Liberal | Sir John Quick | 13,378 | 46.6 | −5.0 |
| Independent | Cyril James | 821 | 2.9 | +2.9 |
| Total formal votes | | 28,687 | 97.8 | |
| Informal votes | | 639 | 2.2 | |
| Turnout | | 29,326 | 78.6 | |
| Labor gain from Liberal | | Swing | +3.6 | |

==== 1910 ====
1910 Australian federal election: Bendigo
| Party | Candidate | Votes | % | ±% |
|---|---|---|---|---|
| Liberal | Sir John Quick | 12,723 | 51.3 | −0.4 |
| Labour | Frank Brennan | 12,065 | 48.7 | +0.4 |
| Total formal votes | | 24,788 | 99.0 | |
| Informal votes | | 244 | 1.0 | |
| Turnout | | 25,032 | 79.2 | |
| Liberal gain from Independent | | Swing | −0.4 | |

=== Elections in the 1900s ===
==== 1906 ====
1906 Australian federal election: Bendigo
| Party | Candidate | Votes | % | ±% |
|---|---|---|---|---|
| Ind. Protectionist | Sir John Quick | 9,617 | 51.7 | +51.7 |
| Labour | Thomas Glass | 8,969 | 48.3 | +29.9 |
| Total formal votes | | 18,586 | 97.5 | |
| Informal votes | | 467 | 2.5 | |
| Turnout | | 19,053 | 59.1 | |
| Ind. Protectionist gain from Protectionist | | Swing | +51.7 | |

==== 1903 ====
1903 Australian federal election: Bendigo
| Party | Candidate | Votes | % | ±% |
|---|---|---|---|---|
| Protectionist | Sir John Quick | 6,020 | 41.9 | −58.1 |
| Labour | David Smith | 5,704 | 39.7 | +39.7 |
| Free Trade | Cyril James | 2,650 | 18.4 | +18.4 |
| Total formal votes | | 14,374 | 99.1 | |
| Informal votes | | 129 | 0.9 | |
| Turnout | | 14,500 | 57.3 | |
| Protectionist hold | | Swing | −58.1 | |

==== 1901 ====
1901 Australian federal election: Bendigo
| Party | Candidate | Votes | % | ±% |
|---|---|---|---|---|
| Protectionist | Sir John Quick | unopposed | | |
| Protectionist win | | (new seat) | | |
