= Electoral results for the district of Bendigo =

Australian district election results

This is a list of electoral results for the electoral district of Bendigo in Victorian state elections.

== Members for Bendigo ==
| Member | Party | Term |
|---|---|---|
| Arthur Cook | Labor | 1927–1945 |
| Bill Galvin | Labor | 1945–1955 |
| John Stanistreet | Liberal and Country | 1955–1958 |
| Bill Galvin | Labor | 1958–1964 |
| Robert Trethewey | Liberal and Country/Liberal | 1964–1973 |
| Daryl McClure | Liberal | 1973–1982 |
| David Kennedy | Labor | 1982–1985 |

== Election results ==
=== Elections in the 1980s ===
1982 Victorian state election: Bendigo
| Party | Candidate | Votes | % | ±% |
|---|---|---|---|---|
| Labor | David Kennedy | 12,456 | 47.6 | +5.4 |
| Liberal | Daryl McClure | 10,038 | 38.3 | −4.3 |
| Democrats | Ian Price | 1,365 | 5.2 | −10.0 |
| Independent | Richard Turner | 1,222 | 4.7 | +4.7 |
| Independent | Christopher Stoltz | 726 | 2.8 | +2.8 |
| Independent | Joe Pearce | 389 | 1.5 | +1.5 |
| Total formal votes | | 26,196 | 97.5 | −0.7 |
| Informal votes | | 682 | 2.5 | +0.7 |
| Turnout | | 26,878 | 95.7 | +0.5 |
Two-party-preferred result
| Labor | David Kennedy | 14,372 | 54.9 | +6.1 |
| Liberal | Daryl McClure | 11,824 | 45.1 | −6.1 |
| Labor gain from Liberal | | Swing | +6.1 | |

=== Elections in the 1970s ===
1979 Victorian state election: Bendigo
| Party | Candidate | Votes | % | ±% |
|---|---|---|---|---|
| Liberal | Daryl McClure | 10,829 | 42.6 | −11.0 |
| Labor | Elaine Knight | 10,742 | 42.2 | −4.2 |
| Democrats | Christopher Stoltz | 3,861 | 15.2 | +15.2 |
| Total formal votes | | 25,432 | 98.2 | −0.5 |
| Informal votes | | 467 | 1.8 | +0.5 |
| Turnout | | 25,899 | 95.2 | −0.6 |
Two-party-preferred result
| Liberal | Daryl McClure | 13,016 | 51.2 | −2.4 |
| Labor | Elaine Knight | 12,416 | 48.8 | +2.4 |
| Liberal hold | | Swing | −2.4 | |

1976 Victorian state election: Bendigo
| Party | Candidate | Votes | % | ±% |
|---|---|---|---|---|
| Liberal | Daryl McClure | 13,021 | 53.6 | +15.6 |
| Labor | Esmond Curnow | 11,290 | 46.4 | −0.5 |
| Total formal votes | | 24,625 | 98.7 | |
| Informal votes | | 314 | 1.3 | |
| Turnout | | 24,625 | 95.8 | |
| Liberal hold | | Swing | +1.6 | |

1973 Victorian state election: Bendigo
| Party | Candidate | Votes | % | ±% |
|---|---|---|---|---|
| Labor | David Boyle | 10,926 | 43.7 | −0.9 |
| Liberal | Daryl McClure | 9,557 | 38.2 | −1.8 |
| Country | Peter Pritchard | 2,512 | 10.0 | +10.0 |
| Democratic Labor | Raymond Peterson | 2,037 | 8.1 | −7.2 |
| Total formal votes | | 25,032 | 98.3 | −0.1 |
| Informal votes | | 442 | 1.7 | +0.1 |
| Turnout | | 25,474 | 96.2 | +0.3 |
Two-party-preferred result
| Liberal | Daryl McClure | 13,743 | 54.9 | +2.5 |
| Labor | David Boyle | 11,289 | 45.1 | −2.5 |
| Liberal hold | | Swing | +2.5 | |

1970 Victorian state election: Bendigo
| Party | Candidate | Votes | % | ±% |
|---|---|---|---|---|
| Labor | Kevin Curran | 9,991 | 44.6 | +4.3 |
| Liberal | Robert Trethewey | 8,960 | 40.0 | +7.9 |
| Democratic Labor | Paul Brennan | 3,435 | 15.3 | +0.5 |
| Total formal votes | | 22,386 | 98.4 | +0.6 |
| Informal votes | | 360 | 1.6 | −0.6 |
| Turnout | | 22,746 | 95.9 | +0.1 |
Two-party-preferred result
| Liberal | Robert Trethewey | 11,740 | 52.4 | +1.7 |
| Labor | Kevin Curran | 10,646 | 47.6 | −1.7 |
| Liberal hold | | Swing | +1.7 | |

=== Elections in the 1960s ===
1967 Victorian state election: Bendigo
| Party | Candidate | Votes | % | ±% |
|---|---|---|---|---|
| Labor | Donald McIntyre | 8,598 | 40.3 | −3.8 |
| Liberal | Robert Trethewey | 6,861 | 32.1 | −6.2 |
| Democratic Labor | Paul Brennan | 3,151 | 14.7 | −2.9 |
| Country | Allan Miles | 2,750 | 12.9 | +12.9 |
| Total formal votes | | 21,360 | 97.8 | |
| Informal votes | | 482 | 2.2 | |
| Turnout | | 21,842 | 95.8 | |
Two-party-preferred result
| Liberal | Robert Trethewey | 10,824 | 50.7 | −1.1 |
| Labor | Donald McIntyre | 10,536 | 49.3 | +1.1 |
| Liberal hold | | Swing | −1.1 | |

1964 Victorian state election: Bendigo
| Party | Candidate | Votes | % | ±% |
|---|---|---|---|---|
| Labor | Donald McIntyre | 9,204 | 44.1 | −8.0 |
| Liberal and Country | Robert Trethewey | 7,994 | 38.3 | +6.8 |
| Democratic Labor | Paul Brennan | 3,675 | 17.6 | +1.2 |
| Total formal votes | | 20,873 | 98.6 | −0.2 |
| Informal votes | | 302 | 1.4 | +0.2 |
| Turnout | | 21,175 | 95.6 | −1.0 |
Two-party-preferred result
| Liberal and Country | Robert Trethewey | 10,813 | 51.8 | +6.3 |
| Labor | Donald McIntyre | 10,060 | 48.2 | −6.3 |
| Liberal and Country gain from Labor | | Swing | +6.3 | |

1961 Victorian state election: Bendigo
| Party | Candidate | Votes | % | ±% |
|---|---|---|---|---|
| Labor | Bill Galvin | 10,875 | 52.1 | +4.9 |
| Liberal and Country | Thomas Flood | 6,579 | 31.5 | +4.1 |
| Democratic Labor | Paul Brennan | 3,434 | 16.4 | +3.4 |
| Total formal votes | | 20,888 | 98.8 | +0.3 |
| Informal votes | | 263 | 1.2 | −0.3 |
| Turnout | | 21,151 | 96.6 | +0.2 |
Two-party-preferred result
| Labor | Bill Galvin | 11,389 | 54.5 | +2.5 |
| Liberal and Country | Thomas Flood | 9,499 | 45.5 | −2.5 |
| Labor hold | | Swing | +2.5 | |

=== Elections in the 1950s ===
1958 Victorian state election: Bendigo
| Party | Candidate | Votes | % | ±% |
|---|---|---|---|---|
| Labor | Bill Galvin | 9,812 | 47.2 | |
| Liberal and Country | John Stanistreet | 5,699 | 27.4 | |
| Democratic Labor | James Brosnan | 2,691 | 12.9 | |
| Country | William Nicholls | 2,571 | 12.4 | |
| Total formal votes | | 20,773 | 98.5 | |
| Informal votes | | 307 | 1.5 | |
| Turnout | | 21,080 | 96.4 | |
Two-party-preferred result
| Labor | Bill Galvin | 10,801 | 52.0 | |
| Liberal and Country | John Stanistreet | 9,972 | 48.0 | |
| Labor gain from Liberal and Country | | Swing | | |

1955 Victorian state election: Bendigo
| Party | Candidate | Votes | % | ±% |
|---|---|---|---|---|
| Labor | Bill Galvin | 8,955 | 44.4 | |
| Liberal and Country | John Stanistreet | 5,627 | 27.9 | |
| Labor (A-C) | Arthur Cook | 3,036 | 15.0 | |
| Country | Norman Oliver | 2,564 | 12.7 | |
| Total formal votes | | 20,182 | 98.5 | |
| Informal votes | | 315 | 1.5 | |
| Turnout | | 20,497 | 96.2 | |
Two-party-preferred result
| Liberal and Country | John Stanistreet | 10,097 | 50.03 | |
| Labor | Bill Galvin | 10,085 | 49.97 | |
| Liberal and Country gain from Labor | | Swing | | |

1952 Victorian state election: Bendigo
| Party | Candidate | Votes | % | ±% |
|---|---|---|---|---|
| Labor | Bill Galvin | unopposed | | |
| Labor hold | | Swing | | |

1950 Victorian state election: Bendigo
| Party | Candidate | Votes | % | ±% |
|---|---|---|---|---|
| Labor | Bill Galvin | 12,633 | 59.2 | +2.8 |
| Liberal and Country | Harold Every | 8,724 | 40.8 | +7.8 |
| Total formal votes | | 21,357 | 99.3 | 0.0 |
| Informal votes | | 158 | 0.7 | 0.0 |
| Turnout | | 21,515 | 96.2 | +1.0 |
| Labor hold | | Swing | +1.7 | |

=== Elections in the 1940s ===
1947 Victorian state election: Bendigo
| Party | Candidate | Votes | % | ±% |
|---|---|---|---|---|
| Labor | Bill Galvin | 11,618 | 56.4 | −43.6 |
| Country | Norman Oliver | 6,795 | 33.0 | +33.0 |
| Liberal | Eric Thomson | 2,190 | 10.6 | +10.6 |
| Total formal votes | | 20,603 | 99.3 | |
| Informal votes | | 140 | 0.7 | |
| Turnout | | 20,743 | 95.2 | |
| Labor hold | | Swing | N/A | |

- Preferences were not distributed.

1945 Victorian state election: Bendigo
| Party | Candidate | Votes | % | ±% |
|---|---|---|---|---|
| Labor | Bill Galvin | unopposed | | |
| Labor hold | | Swing | | |

1945 Bendigo state by-election
| Party | Candidate | Votes | % | ±% |
|---|---|---|---|---|
| Labor | Bill Galvin | 9,647 | 61.5 | |
| Liberal | William Day | 6,034 | 38.5 | |
| Total formal votes | | 15,681 | 99.1 | |
| Informal votes | | 149 | 0.9 | |
| Turnout | | 15,830 | 85.7 | |
| Labor hold | | Swing | N/A | |

1943 Victorian state election: Bendigo
| Party | Candidate | Votes | % | ±% |
|---|---|---|---|---|
| Labor | Arthur Cook | unopposed | | |
| Labor hold | | Swing | | |

1940 Victorian state election: Bendigo
| Party | Candidate | Votes | % | ±% |
|---|---|---|---|---|
| Labor | Arthur Cook | unopposed | | |
| Labor hold | | Swing | | |

=== Elections in the 1930s ===
1937 Victorian state election: Bendigo
| Party | Candidate | Votes | % | ±% |
|---|---|---|---|---|
| Labor | Arthur Cook | unopposed | | |
| Labor hold | | Swing | | |

1935 Victorian state election: Bendigo
| Party | Candidate | Votes | % | ±% |
|---|---|---|---|---|
| Labor | Arthur Cook | 10,457 | 61.7 | +10.1 |
| United Australia | Albert Staples | 6,502 | 38.3 | +12.3 |
| Total formal votes | | 16,959 | 99.2 | +0.3 |
| Informal votes | | 135 | 0.8 | −0.3 |
| Turnout | | 17,094 | 95.1 | −0.4 |
| Labor hold | | Swing | +7.9 | |

1932 Victorian state election: Bendigo
| Party | Candidate | Votes | % | ±% |
|---|---|---|---|---|
| Labor | Arthur Cook | 8,239 | 51.6 | −48.4 |
| United Australia | John Barton | 4,157 | 26.0 | +26.0 |
| Country | Joseph Don | 3,566 | 22.3 | +22.3 |
| Total formal votes | | 15,962 | 98.9 | |
| Informal votes | | 176 | 1.1 | |
| Turnout | | 16,138 | 95.5 | |
Two-party-preferred result
| Labor | Arthur Cook | | 53.8 | −46.2 |
| United Australia | John Barton | | 46.2 | +46.2 |
| Labor hold | | Swing | N/A | |

- Two party preferred vote was estimated.

=== Elections in the 1920s ===
1929 Victorian state election: Bendigo
| Party | Candidate | Votes | % | ±% |
|---|---|---|---|---|
| Labor | Arthur Cook | unopposed | | |
| Labor hold | | Swing | | |

1927 Victorian state election: Bendigo
| Party | Candidate | Votes | % | ±% |
|---|---|---|---|---|
| Labor | Arthur Cook | 8,954 | 62.7 | |
| Nationalist | William Ewing | 5,331 | 37.3 | |
| Total formal votes | | 14,285 | 98.9 | |
| Informal votes | | 171 | 1.1 | |
| Turnout | | 14,456 | 67.7 | |
| Labor hold | | Swing | | |
