= St Just Point =

Former satellite residential area of Long Gully, Bendigo

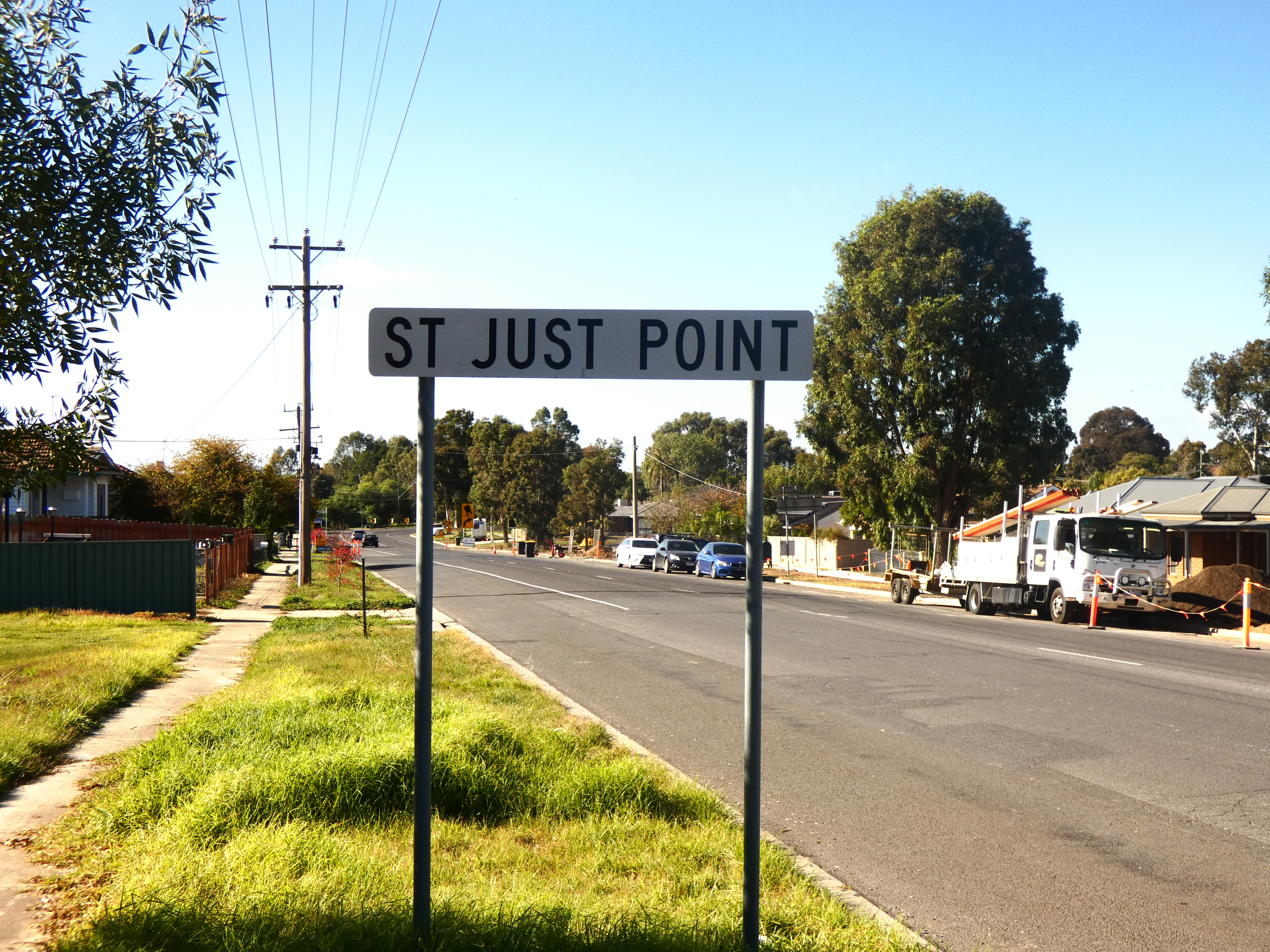
- Entering St Just Point, May 2026

- Coordinates: 36°44′46.5″S 144°15′01.0″E
- Country: Australia
- State: Victoria
- City: Bendigo
- LGA: City of Greater Bendigo
- Location: 0.2 km (0.12 mi) SW of Long Gully; 3.2 km (2.0 mi) NW of Bendigo
- Established: 1870
- Abolished: 1998

Government
  - State electorate: Bendigo West
  - Federal division: Bendigo

Population
  - Totals: 59 (1872); 75 (1882)
- Postcode: 3550

St Just Point, officially St Just's Point, was a former satellite residential area located in the Bendigo suburb of Long Gully. The area was located 0.2 km (0 mi) southwest from Long Gully and 3.2 km (2 mi) north west from the centre of Bendigo. St Just Point was recognised as a separate area within Bendigo until 1998, when it was incorporated into the boundaries of Long Gully. The demonym of a St Just Point resident was "St Juster".

== Toponymy ==
The official name for the area was St Just's Point, with an apostrophe. However, common usage had altered the name to St Just Point or, in some cases, "the Point", since the area's boundaries resembled an arrowhead, a "point". It was named for the West Cornish town of St Just, since many of those who moved to the area in 1870 were former residents of that Cornish town. In consequence, occasionally the area was referred to as Pastie's Point, named for Cornish pasties, which were eaten regularly in the area until at least the 1930s.

== History ==
=== Formation ===
St Just Point was established in 1870, when a contingent of Cornish people arrived in the area and set up tents, although there were buildings present in the area pre-1870. A majority of the arrivals were from the West Cornish town of St Just, and, since the area's boundaries resembled an arrowhead, the area was called St Just's Point. The decline of Cornwall's mining industry in the early 1860s, and the discovery of alluvial tin in New South Wales in 1870, resulted in many Cornish families moving to Australia to settle. In consequence, many residents of St Just Point were former miners from Cornwall, and as such, a major place of employment for St Justers was the nearby Hercules and Energetic mine, established in 1860.

=== Incorporation into Long Gully ===
In 1998, the boundaries of the local areas of Bendigo were redefined by the City of Greater Bendigo. Originally, the new suburb of West Bendigo was to incorporate St Just Point, but following input from residents, the boundaries of St Just Point were instead incorporated into Long Gully. In response to the input received from the St Just Point residents, a City of Greater Bendigo representative wrote that it was "more appropriate" that the area be incorporated into Long Gully, and proposed that the area could instead become a "heritage sub-set" of Long Gully. However, no further action relating to this proposal has been taken, and St Just Point is not officially recognised as a separate area within Bendigo.

=== Black Saturday bushfires ===
Many buildings in Long Gully were destroyed during the Black Saturday bushfires of 2009; eighteen of these homes were located within St Just Point's former boundaries. Michael Kane, who lived at the house built in 1871 by Richard Pope, located in St Just Point, was the only person in Bendigo to die in these bushfires.

=== Legacy ===
Despite no longer being an official place in Bendigo, today there are two signs, originally installed in 1993, bearing the St Just Point name located in Long Gully.

In 1988, the Bendigo Advertiser began printing fortnightly cartoon strips titled "St Just's Point". The cartoons, hand drawn by Ian Glanville, humorously explored how the Cornish of Bendigo (many of who were, historically, St Just Point residents) often misused the English language. Over 180 of these cartoons were published in total.

In 2003, a poppet head monument was erected in Long Gully, commemorating the contribution of St Just Point and Long Gully residents to Bendigo's mining industry, and noting that many were of Cornish descent. On 12 March 2011, a monument commemorating the relationship between Cornwall and St Just Pont was erected in St Just Point, in response to the impacts of the 2009 Black Saturday bushfires in St Just Pont and Long Gully.

== Demographics ==
St Just Point was first listed on rate records in 1872, when a population of 59 residents was recorded for that year. In 1882, 75 residents lived in the area. When residents of the area were listed in official documents, their address was given as "St Just Point, Long Gully, Bendigo".

== Geography ==
The boundaries of St Just Point resembled an arrowhead. It was located on the far western border of Long Gully, on the eastern slopes of a hill called the Sheefold, a hill which was so named until the late 1940s. A thoroughfare in the area, Sheefold Way, is named for the hill. The area was semi-circled by the Derwent Gully Creek, the Sparrowhawk Creek (now part of the Long Gully Creek) and the Long Gully Creek. A cobblestone crossing was built over the Long Gully Creek, existing their until around 1973. It was located on the western border of St Just Point, providing access into the bordering suburb of Long Gully.

From 1862 until 1996, the centre of St Just Point was located where three Sandhurst municipalities met: the Shire of Marong, the Borough of Eaglehawk and the City of Bendigo. As a result, the area did not receive council services, such as electricity poles, which were only introduced in 1937, since the area was viewed as a small, non-priority area on the outskirts of three separate municipalities.

== Amenities ==
From pre-1870, St Just Point had a grocer shop that served local residents. The store closed in 1945, and was subsequently demolished in 1970. Shortly after 1897, a Coolgardie safe was installed in the area. It was used often by St Justers. The Pearl Manufacturing Company, which specialised in sauces and pickles, was established in St Just Point in 1926. It remained in operation until 1940. In the early 1940s, a plaster sheet factory was established in the area, closing in 1960.

== Culture ==
The Christmas Day Sports, held in the nearby satellite residential area of Sparrowhawk Gully (now part of Long Gully), were held annually for around twenty years. Residents from across Bendigo would participate in the sports, which included footraces, dancing contests, quoits, tug-of-war competitions, and Cornish wrestling. Results of these competitions were regularly published in local newspapers until 1909, when the Day began to decline in popularity, eventually ending several years later. Bonfire nights were also popular in St Just Point. These occurred on special occasions, such as the King's/Queen's Birthday and ANZAC Day.

=== Landmarks ===
Several trees in St Just Point were regarded by residents as local landmarks. A twenty-metre-high pine tree, planted by J. H. Davey before 1900 (who later became mayor of the Borough of Eaglehawk from 1943 to 1944) was regarded as a prominent landmark in the area, until its removal in 1950. In the mid-1940s, a tree located on private property was decorated by St Just Point residents at Christmas time. It has been cited as having started the tradition of Bendigo residents decorating Christmas trees in the town; a prominent example of this is the tree located in Rosalind Park.

== Sport ==
From pre-1870 to 1930, Gist's Oval was used by St Just Point residents for recreational and professional sporting activities. Named after Thomas Gist, a founding member of the Long Gully Fire Brigade, and George Gist, a later member of the fire brigade, the gravel oval hosted sporting events that included football, cricket, athletics and cycling.

Until the late 1890s at least, cockfighting was also practiced. Games had to be hidden away from view, at the edge of St Just Point.

Tennis was played by St Just Point residents from the 1930s, on a gravel clay tennis court located on private property. The onset of World War II resulted in decreased participation and the court's eventual closure during the middle years of the war. In 1930, the St Just Point Cricket Club was formed. Likewise, the club disbanded at the onset of war.

In 1929, the Long Gully Golf Club was built. The course had space for only nine holes, seven of which were located within St Just Point. The golf course was the first of four to be built in Bendigo. The others, which still exist, were the Belvoir Park Golf Club, the Eaglehawk Golf Club, and the Neangar Park Golf Club. Due to the establishment of these golf clubs, the Long Gully Golf Club was disbanded in 1932, owing to lack of participation. Following sluicing of a creek in the area, the course was made unusable by 1934.

== Notable residents ==
- Dick Davey, owner of the former Sparrowhawk Hotel. Davey was instrumental in establishing the Christmas Day Sports held in St Just Point.
- Arthur Dower, superintendent of St Mary's Anglican Church in Kangaroo Flat for twenty-seven years. Dower Park in Kangaroo Flat is named after him.
- Beatrice Guidice, the treasurer of Bendigo's first home for the blind, built in 1927. Wife of the Mayor of Bendigo, Michael Gabriel Guidice.
- Roger Kemp, born in Long Gully, on the border of St Just Point, Kemp was an awarding-winning artist, receiving an OBE and an AO.
- Richard Pope, British-born miner who lived in St Just Point for several years. Well-known as a diarist of pre-Federation Australia.
- Pearce "Peach" Phillips, life member of the Eaglehawk Golf Club. Phillips painted the rose on the Rose of Australia hotel, Long Gully.
- James McInnes Sinclair, Victorian Agent-General in London and Victorian Trade Commissioner in the Far East.
- Dorothy Strachan OAM, recipient of the Order of Australia medal in 2006 for service to the community of Cohuna.
- Sarah Lawry Wearne, well-known resident of St Just Point, known as "Gran" Wearne by St Justers. One panel of The Cornish Miner statue located in the suburb of Bendigo, of a woman milking a goat, is dedicated to Wearne.

== See also ==
- Cornish Australians
