= Dick Pope =

Dick or Richard Pope may refer to:

- Dick Pope Sr. (1900–1988), founder of Cypress Gardens in Winter Haven, Florida; Waterskiing Hall of Fame inductee
- Dick Pope Jr. (1930–2007), Waterskiing Hall of Fame inductee
- Dick Pope (cinematographer) (1947–2024), British cinematographer
- Richard Shackleton Pope (1793–1884), architect
- Richard Pope (miner) (1834–1900), miner and diarist
- Richard Pope (politician) (born 1962), American perennial candidate
