= Electoral district of Bendigo =

Former Victorian state electoral district

Coordinates: 36°45′S 144°16′E

Bendigo Victoria—Legislative Assembly
- State: Victoria
- Created: 1927
- Abolished: 1985
- Demographic: Urban

The electoral district of Bendigo was an electorate of the Victorian Legislative Assembly in the Australian state of Victoria. Centred on the city of Bendigo, the district was formed when the electorates of Bendigo East and Bendigo West were merged into a single district in 1927. Bendigo was abolished in 1985 when it was once again split into separate East and West districts.

== Members for Bendigo ==
Member	Party	Term
Arthur Cook	Labor	1927–1945
Bill Galvin	Labor	1945–1955
John Stanistreet	Liberal and Country	1955–1958
Bill Galvin	Labor	1958–1964
Robert Trethewey	Liberal and Country/Liberal	1964–1973
Daryl McClure	Liberal	1973–1982
David Kennedy	Labor	1982–1985

== See also ==
- Electoral district of Bendigo East
- Electoral district of Bendigo West
