= John Bourchier (politician) =

Australian politician (1929–2017)

John Bourchier CBE
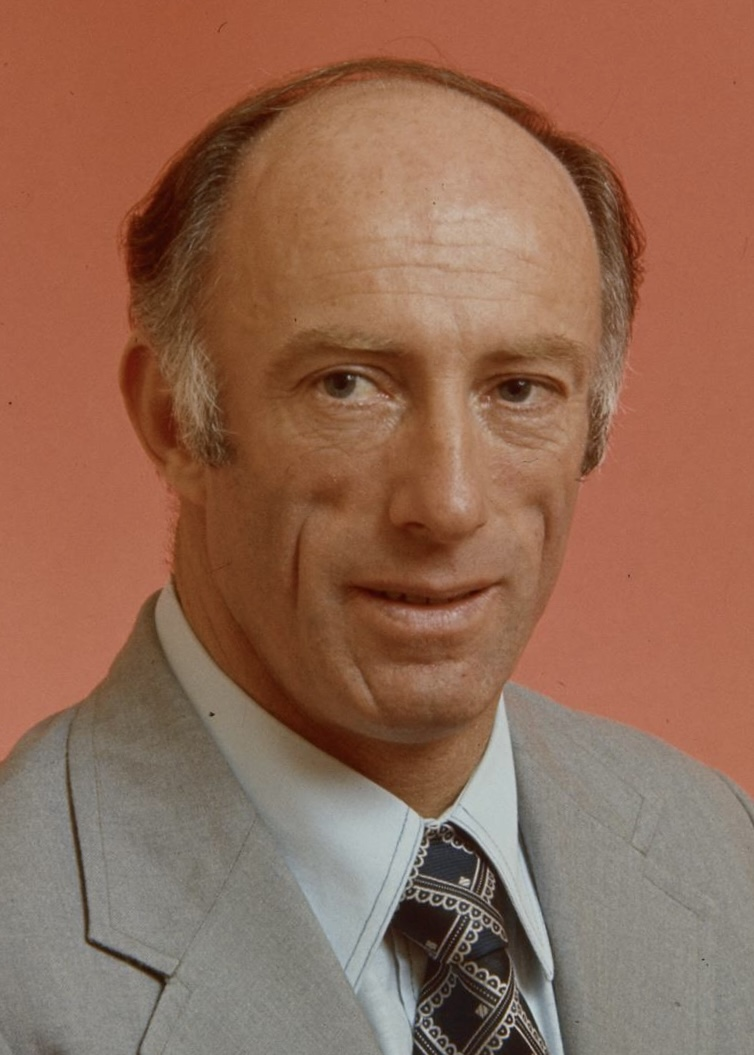
- Bourchier in 1974

Member of the Australian Parliament for Bendigo
- In office 2 December 1972 – 5 March 1983
- Preceded by: David Kennedy
- Succeeded by: John Brumby

Personal details
- Born: 12 October 1929 Ballarat, Victoria, Australia
- Died: 31 August 2017 (aged 87) Brisbane, Queensland, Australia
- Party: Liberal
- Occupation: Timber merchant

John William Bourchier, CBE (12 October 1929 – 31 August 2017) was an Australian politician. He was a member of the Liberal Party and served in the House of Representatives from 1972 to 1983, representing the Victorian seat of Bendigo. He served as government whip in the Fraser government from 1975 to 1983.

== Early life ==
Bourchier was born on 12 October 1929 in Ballarat, Victoria. He was a timber merchant before entering politics. He was an associate fellow of the Australian Institute of Management.

== Politics ==
Bourchier was elected to the House of Representatives at the 1972 federal election, narrowly winning the seat of Bendigo for the Liberal Party from the incumbent Australian Labor Party (ALP) MP David Kennedy. He polled only 27 percent of first preferences, but overtook Kennedy on Country Party and Democratic Labor Party preferences to finish with 50.2 percent of the two-party-preferred count. The campaign was acrimonious, with Kennedy targeted by anti-abortion campaigners and publicly criticised by Catholic bishop Bernard Stewart.

In parliament, Bourchier served as deputy chair of the House Standing Committee on Environment and Conservation. He was appointed as Liberal Party whip in March 1975 and became government whip after the 1975 election, retaining that position for the duration of the Fraser government. According to The Canberra Times, as whip Bourchier was nicknamed "the Gauleiter" and prominently displayed an actual whip on the walls of his office. He was regarded as a "key conduit" between Prime Minister Malcolm Fraser and the Liberal backbench. In 1981, he intervened in the preselection ballot for the Tasmanian seat of Wilmot to oppose incumbent Liberal MP and Fraser critic Max Burr, which resulted in "a lengthy backbench blow-up".

Bourchier lost his seat at the 1983 election to ALP candidate and future Victorian premier John Brumby, with his seat having remained marginal throughout his time in parliament. He was opposed by the Tasmanian Wilderness Society over the Franklin Dam controversy, and also faced opposition due to high local unemployment and concerns over the government's intended closure of the Bendigo Ordnance Factory.

== Later life ==
In 1986, Bourchier unsuccessfully sought Liberal preselection for the casual vacancy caused by the death of Victorian senator Alan Missen. He moved to the Gold Coast in the late 1980s where he remained active in the Queensland Liberal Party. In 1989 he led efforts to oust Liberal state president John Moore for his role in the Liberal leadership spill against John Howard. In 1994 he publicly called for the resignation of Liberal leader John Hewson.

Bourchier died in Brisbane on 31 August 2017, aged 87.

Parliament of Australia
Preceded by David Kennedy	Member for Bendigo; 1972–1983	Succeeded by John Brumby
