= Lisa Chesters =

Australian politician

Lisa Chesters MP
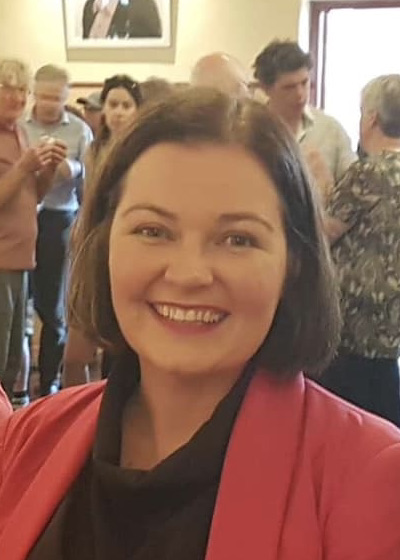

Member of the Australian Parliament for Bendigo
- Incumbent
- Assumed office 7 September 2013
- Preceded by: Steve Gibbons

Personal details
- Born: 11 February 1980 (age 46) Wentworthville, New South Wales, Australia
- Party: Labor
- Domestic partner: Matt Emond
- Children: 2
- Education: University of Queensland (BA)
- Profession: Union organiser Politician
- Website: www.lisachesters.org

Lisa Marie Chesters (born 11 February 1980) is an Australian politician. She is a member of the Australian Labor Party (ALP) and has been a member of the House of Representatives since 2013, representing the Division of Bendigo. Prior to her election to parliament she worked as a union organiser for United Voice.

== Early life ==
Chesters was born in Wentworthville, New South Wales. Her parents owned a small business, although her mother Jenny Chesters later completed a PhD as a mature-age student and became an academic.

Chesters holds the degree of Bachelor of Arts from the University of Queensland. She was involved in student politics, serving as secretary of the University of Queensland Union in 2002 and as women's officer of the National Union of Students in 2003. She subsequently worked as an organiser for United Voice from 2003 to 2013.

== Politics ==
Prior to her election to parliament, Chesters held senior positions in the Australian Labor Party (Victorian Branch), serving on the administrative committee, as a delegate to state and national conference, and as president of the women's affairs policy committee.

=== Parliament ===
Chesters was elected to the House of Representatives at the 2013 federal election, retaining the Division of Bendigo for the ALP following the retirement of Steve Gibbons. She is the first woman to represent the seat, which has existed since Federation in 1901. She was re-elected at the 2016, 2019, 2022 and 2025 federal elections.

After the 2016 election, Chesters was promoted to Bill Shorten's shadow ministry as a shadow assistant minister, holding the portfolios of "workplace relations" and "rural and regional Australia". She did not retain her place when Anthony Albanese succeeded Shorten as party leader following the 2019 election.

== Personal life ==
Chesters is in a long-term relationship with Matt Emond, who was deputy mayor of the City of Greater Bendigo from 2019 to 2020. Their first child was born in 2019. Their second child was born in 2021. She lives in Kennington, a suburb in Bendigo in Victoria.

In 2018, Chesters was diagnosed with conjuctival melanoma, a rare eye cancer. She received surgical treatment and radiotherapy.

Chesters is a member of the United Workers Union, the Discovery Centre Bendigo, Emily's List Australia and the Bendigo Art Gallery.

Australian House of Representatives
Preceded by Steve Gibbons	Member for Bendigo; 2013–present	Incumbent
