= John Stanistreet =

Australian politician

John Stanistreet (7 April 1913 – 30 October 1971) was an Australian politician.

He was born in Bendigo to legal manager John Jepson Stanistreet and Maud McIlroy. He attended Bendigo High School and Dookie Agricultural College, and in 1929 began working for his father's accountancy firm. He eventually became principal accountant. On 9 January 1937 he married Glenice Boswell Leed; they had one son. During World War II he served in the Royal Australian Air Force, but was wounded in 1942 and invalided back to Australia in 1943. In 1955 he was elected to the Victorian Legislative Assembly as the Liberal and Country Party member for Bendigo, but he was defeated in 1958. Stanistreet died in Bendigo in 1971.

Victorian Legislative Assembly
Preceded by Bill Galvin	Member for Bendigo; 1955–1958	Succeeded by Bill Galvin
