= West Cornwall (UK region) =

Westernmost Area of the "Cornwall" region in the United Kingdom

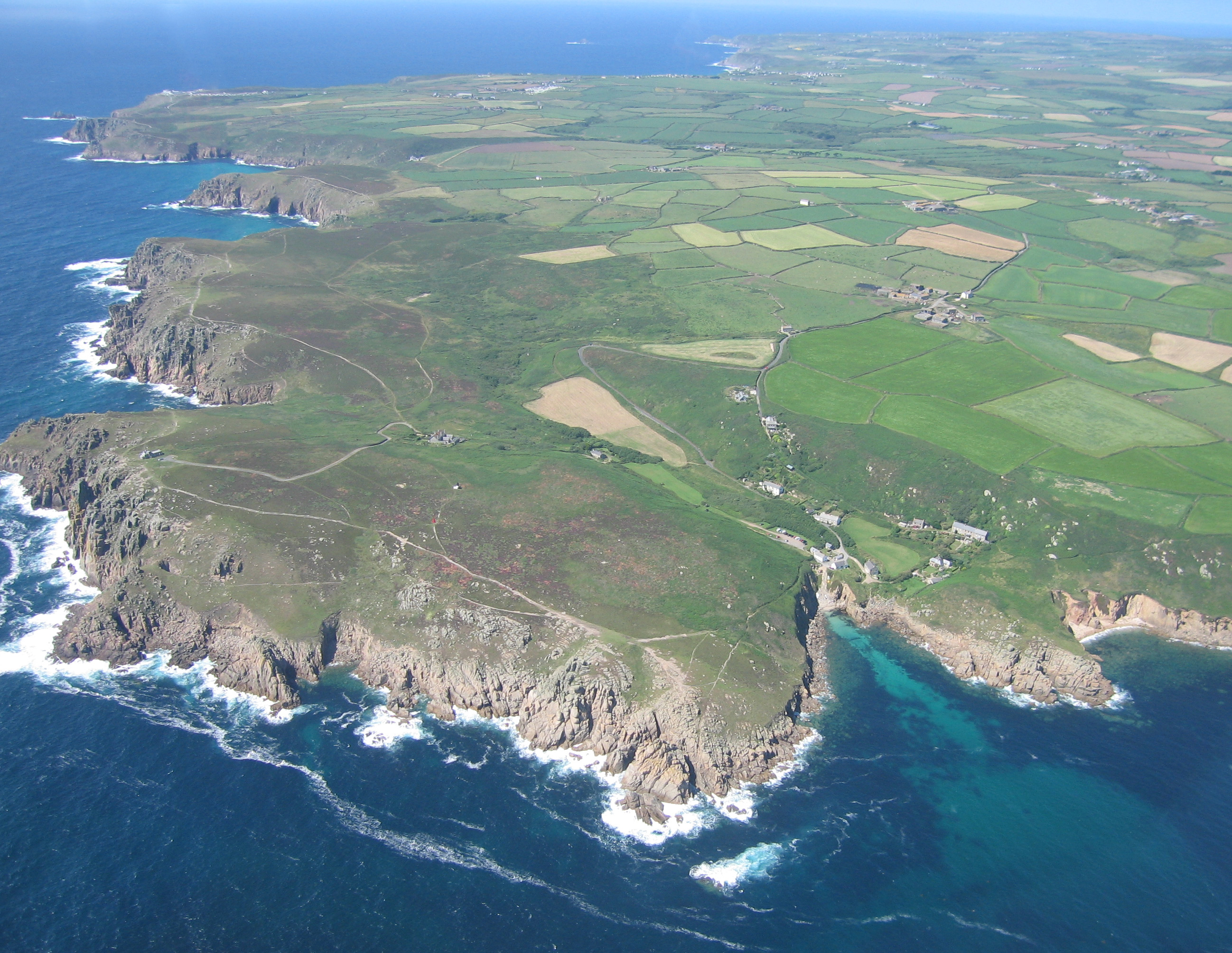
Photo of the West Penwith coast of Cornwall. Taken from a helicopter on the way from Tresco Isles of Scilly to Penzance

West Cornwall is a name used to refer to the westernmost part of Cornwall, England, in the United Kingdom. It is also used by Cornwall Council and Cornwall Housing as part of their resource allocation and area management plans, in which Cornwall is divided into three sections, west, central and east. The South West Coast Path also uses West Cornwall to describe its westernmost parts.

West Cornwall covers the area of the Penwith and Kerrier districts, stopping at Carrick which is central Cornwall. Some maps show West Cornwall as covering a smaller area, ending at a line between Hayle and Helston, making West Cornwall the distinct landform at the very South-Western tip of Cornwall.

West Cornwall Hospital is located in Penzance, West Cornwall.

Penzance, St Ives, Hayle, Helston and Land's End are notable places located in West Cornwall.

== Sources ==
- [Cornwall.gov.uk]
