= Bob Cameron (politician) =

Australian state politician

The Honourable Bob Cameron
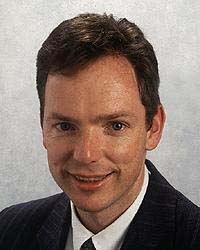

Minister for Emergency Services
- In office 11 October 2010 – 2 December 2010
- Leader: John Brumby
- Preceded by: New position
- Succeeded by: Peter Ryan

Minister for Police and Emergency Services
- In office 1 December 2006 – 11 October 2010
- Leader: Steve Bracks; John Brumby
- Preceded by: Tim Holding
- Succeeded by: James Merlino

Minister for Corrections
- In office 1 December 2006 – 11 October 2010
- Leader: Steve Bracks; John Brumby
- Preceded by: Tim Holding
- Succeeded by: James Merlino

Minister for Agriculture
- In office 5 December 2002 – 1 December 2006
- Premier: Steve Bracks
- Preceded by: Keith Hamilton
- Succeeded by: Joe Helper

Minister for Local Government
- In office 20 October 1999 – 5 December 2002
- Premier: Steve Bracks
- Preceded by: Rob Maclellan
- Succeeded by: Candy Broad

Minister for WorkCover
- In office 20 October 1999 – 5 December 2002
- Premier: Steve Bracks
- Preceded by: New position
- Succeeded by: Rob Hulls

Member of the Victorian Legislative Assembly for Bendigo West
- In office 30 March 1996 – 2 November 2010
- Preceded by: Max Turner
- Succeeded by: Maree Edwards

Personal details
- Born: Robert Graham Cameron; 19 March 1963 (age 63) Robinvale, Victoria, Australia
- Party: Labor
- Children: 3
- Education: University of Melbourne
- Profession: Barrister and solicitor

Robert Graham Cameron (born 19 March 1963) is a former Australian state politician. He represented the electorate of Bendigo West in the Victorian Legislative Assembly. He served as the Minister for Police and Emergency Services and Minister for Corrections (2006–2010 in the third Bracks Ministry and the Brumby Government).

He attended Golden Square High School from 1976 to 78, Bendigo Senior High School from 1979 to 80 and later he also attended the University of Melbourne where he obtained a law degree in 1984. He practiced as a solicitor in Bendigo from 1985 until he was first elected to Parliament in 1996.

In the first Bracks Ministry (1999–2002), Bob Cameron was the Minister for Local Government, WorkCover and TAC. In the second Bracks Ministry (2002–2006) he was Minister for Agriculture . While Minister for Local Government, he sacked the then-controversial Melbourne City Council. As WorkCover Minister he reintroduced common law rights for seriously injured workers.

In 2005, he proposed and implemented a ban on pit bull dogs, after a series of attacks by the animals which Cameron claimed were highly dangerous, a threat to children and the elderly.

Between 2006 and 2010, he was the Police Minister. During this time, Bob Cameron personally signed off $$2.88M to barrister Nicola Gobbo, who was later found to be a police informant whilst she was acting for clients as their lawyer.

On 7 October 2010, Bob Cameron announced his retirement from politics at the upcoming November 2010 election. He resigned the same day as fellow minister Peter Bachelor, both resignations were unexpected at the time.

In September 2022, Cameron was appointed by the Victorian Government as Chair of WorkSafe Victoria.

He is married with one daughter and two sons.

Victorian Legislative Assembly
Preceded by Max Turner	Member for Bendigo West; 1996–2010	Succeeded by Maree Edwards
