= Maree Edwards =

Australian politician

The Honourable Maree Edwards MP

Speaker of the Victorian Legislative Assembly
- Incumbent
- Assumed office 2 August 2022
- Preceded by: Colin Brooks

Member of the Victorian Legislative Assembly for Bendigo West
- Incumbent
- Assumed office 27 November 2010
- Preceded by: Bob Cameron

Personal details
- Born: 2 February 1962 (age 64) Maryborough, Victoria, Australia
- Party: Labor
- Education: La Trobe University, Bendigo
- Website: mareeedwards.com.au

Janice Maree Edwards (born 2 February 1962) is an Australian politician. She has been the member for Bendigo West in the Victorian Legislative Assembly since 2010.

== Education ==
Edwards has a BA (Hons) from La Trobe University, Bendigo.

== Political career ==
Edwards was first elected at the 2010 Victorian state election and has been re-elected ever since. Prior to her election she worked for the previous Member, Bob Cameron.

On 7 March 2017, Edwards was elected Deputy Speaker of the Legislative Assembly and became the Speaker in August 2022, the fourth woman to hold the position. After the November 2022 state election, Edwards was re-elected as Speaker in December 2022 unopposed.

In the eve of 2026 Victorian state election, Edwards announced that she would not re-contest the seat.

== Personal life ==
Edwards has four children.

Victorian Legislative Assembly
Preceded by Bob Cameron	Member for Bendigo West; 2010–present	Incumbent
Preceded by Colin Brooks	Speaker of the Victorian Legislative Assembly; 2022–present	Incumbent
