= Bill Galvin (Australian politician) =

Australian politician (1903–1966)

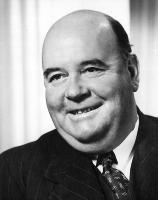

16th Deputy Premier of Victoria
- In office 17 December 1952 – 7 June 1955
- Premier: John Cain
- Preceded by: Keith Dodgshun
- Succeeded by: Arthur Rylah

Member of the Victorian Legislative Assembly for Bendigo
- In office 26 May 1945 – 22 April 1955
- Preceded by: Arthur Cook
- Succeeded by: John Stanistreet
- In office 31 May 1958 – 11 May 1964
- Preceded by: John Stanistreet
- Succeeded by: Robert Trethewey

Personal details
- Born: Leslie William Galvin; 30 April 1903 Woollahra, Sydney, New South Wales, Australia
- Died: 1 July 1966 (aged 63) Bendigo, Victoria, Australia
- Party: Labor Party
- Spouse: Anne Edith Ruby (m. 1931)
- Occupation: Railway worker

Leslie William "Bill" Galvin (30 April 1903 – 1 July 1966) was an Australian politician. He was a Labor Party member of the Victorian Legislative Assembly for Bendigo from 1945 to 1955. He was defeated at the state election, but regained the seat at the 1958 election and served until 1964.

Galvin was born in the Sydney suburb of Woollahra, and was educated at Petersham Commercial School. His family moved to Melbourne, where he continued his education at Scotch College. He became involved in the trade union movement while apprenticed as a fitter and turner with the Victorian Railways in Bendigo, and served on the local Trades Hall councils and branches of the Australian Railways Union.

In 1939, Galvin was elected to the Bendigo City Council, and was mayor of Bendigo from 1944 to 1945. He then considered a tilt at federal politics, but was convinced by his friend, John Cain, to nominate for the 1945 Bendigo state by-election, triggered by the death of Arthur Cook. Duly elected, Galvin was made President of the Board of Land and Works, Commissioner of Crown Lands and Survey, and Minister for Water Supply in the Second Cain Ministry after Labor won the 1945 election. Following the defeat of the Cain government in 1947, Galvin was elected deputy leader of the Labor Party in Victoria.

When Labor re-gained power in 1952, Galvin became Chief Secretary and Deputy Premier, and was acting Premier in 1953, while Cain attended the coronation of Queen Elizabeth II. During the Australian Labor Party split of 1955, Galvin remained loyal to Cain and the traditional party, although his support wavered to Bill Barry after he heard that Cain preferred Ernie Shepherd as deputy leader. At the 1955 election, Galvin was defeated in Bendigo by the Liberal and Country candidate, John Stanistreet, by just twelve votes. His defeat, preventing him from the running for the leadership of the Labor Party, and Shepherd was elected leader when Cain died in 1957. Although Galvin regained Bendigo in 1958, he was once again denied the leadership when he was injured in a car accident days before the leadership ballot, which saw Clive Stoneham voted leader.

Galvin retired from parliament in 1964 due to ill health. He died two years later in Bendigo, suffering from cirrhosis.

Civic offices
Preceded by William Henry Taylor	Mayor of Bendigo; 1944–1945	Succeeded by Anthony Truscott
Victorian Legislative Assembly
Preceded by Arthur Cook	Member for Bendigo; 1945–1955	Succeeded by John Stanistreet
Preceded by John Stanistreet	Member for Bendigo; 1958–1964	Succeeded by Robert Trethewey
Political offices
Preceded by Edwin Mackrell	Minister of Water Supply; 1945–1947	Succeeded by John McDonald
Preceded by William Everard	President of the Board of Land and Works; Commissioner of Crown Lands and Survey; 1945–1947	Succeeded by John McDonald
Preceded by Keith Dodgshun	Deputy Premier of Victoria; Chief Secretary; 1952–1955	Succeeded by Arthur Rylah
