= Long Gully =

- Suburb
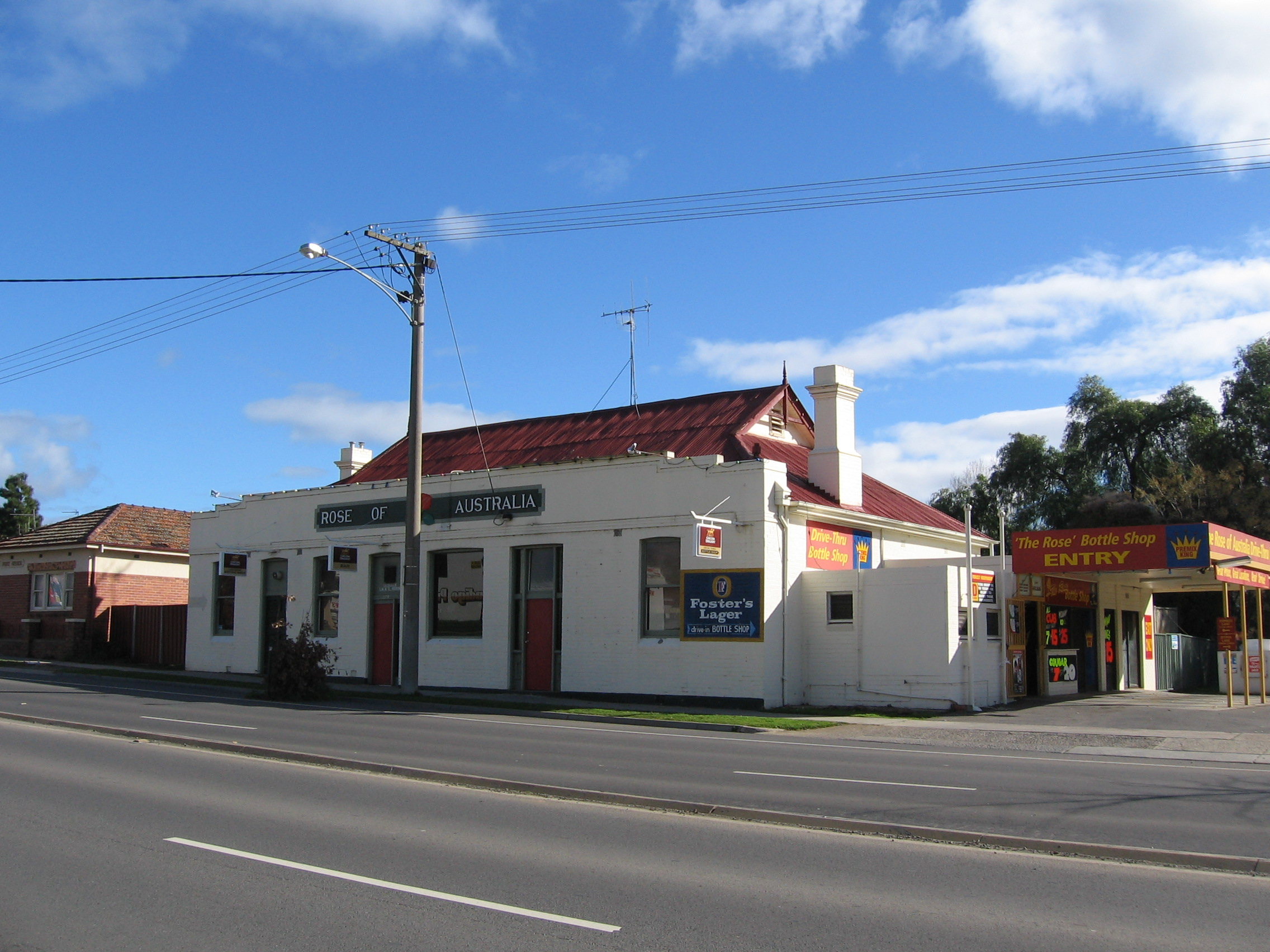
- Rose of Australia Hotel

- Interactive map of Long Gully
- Coordinates: 36°44′S 144°15′E
- Country: Australia
- State: Victoria
- City: Bendigo
- LGA: City of Greater Bendigo
- Location: 3 km (1.9 mi) NW of Bendigo

Government
  - State electorate: Bendigo West
  - Federal division: Bendigo

Population
  - Total: 3,383 (2016 census)
- Postcode: 3550

Long Gully is a suburb of Bendigo in Victoria, Australia. It is located 3 kilometres (1.9 mi) north-west of the Bendigo central business district. At the 2016 census, Long Gully had a population of 3,383.

Long Gully is a working-class suburb of Bendigo, with many older style fibro houses, punctuated by well-established light industry. The suburb is the location of the Bendigo RSL club, in Havilah Road.

== History ==
Long Gully was home to the Carlisle United Gold Mine (formerly the Kentish Mine), which was the richest mine in Bendigo, producing 21.5 tonnes of gold in its lifetime.

Long Gully was heavily affected by the Black Saturday bushfires on 7 February 2009, causing one death.

== Amenities ==
=== Schools and churches ===
Long Gully Primary School (No. 2120) was built in 1879. When it closed in 1992, a majority of the students were transferred to Comet Hill Primary School.

Long Gully had several churches built throughout its history. A uniting church (originally a Methodist church) was built in 1877. In 1883, St Matthew's Anglican Church was built. A third church, the Church of Pius X, was built in 1956, and is now privately owned.

=== Fire stations ===
In 1873, the Long Gully Fire Brigade was formed. It operated from a fire station until a second fire station was opened in 1932; the first station was deregistered the same year.

== Notable residents ==
It is the birthplace of Dick Richards, GC (14 November 1894 – 8 May 1986). Richards was an Australian science teacher who joined Sir Ernest Shackleton's Imperial Trans-Antarctic Expedition in December 1914 as a physicist with the Ross Sea Party. He was 22 years old. He outlived all other members of the expedition and became the last survivor of the so-called "Heroic Age" of Antarctic exploration, dying at the age of 91 in 1986. His life-saving feats in the Antarctic are detailed in the book Shackleton's Heroes.
