= West Bendigo =

- Suburb
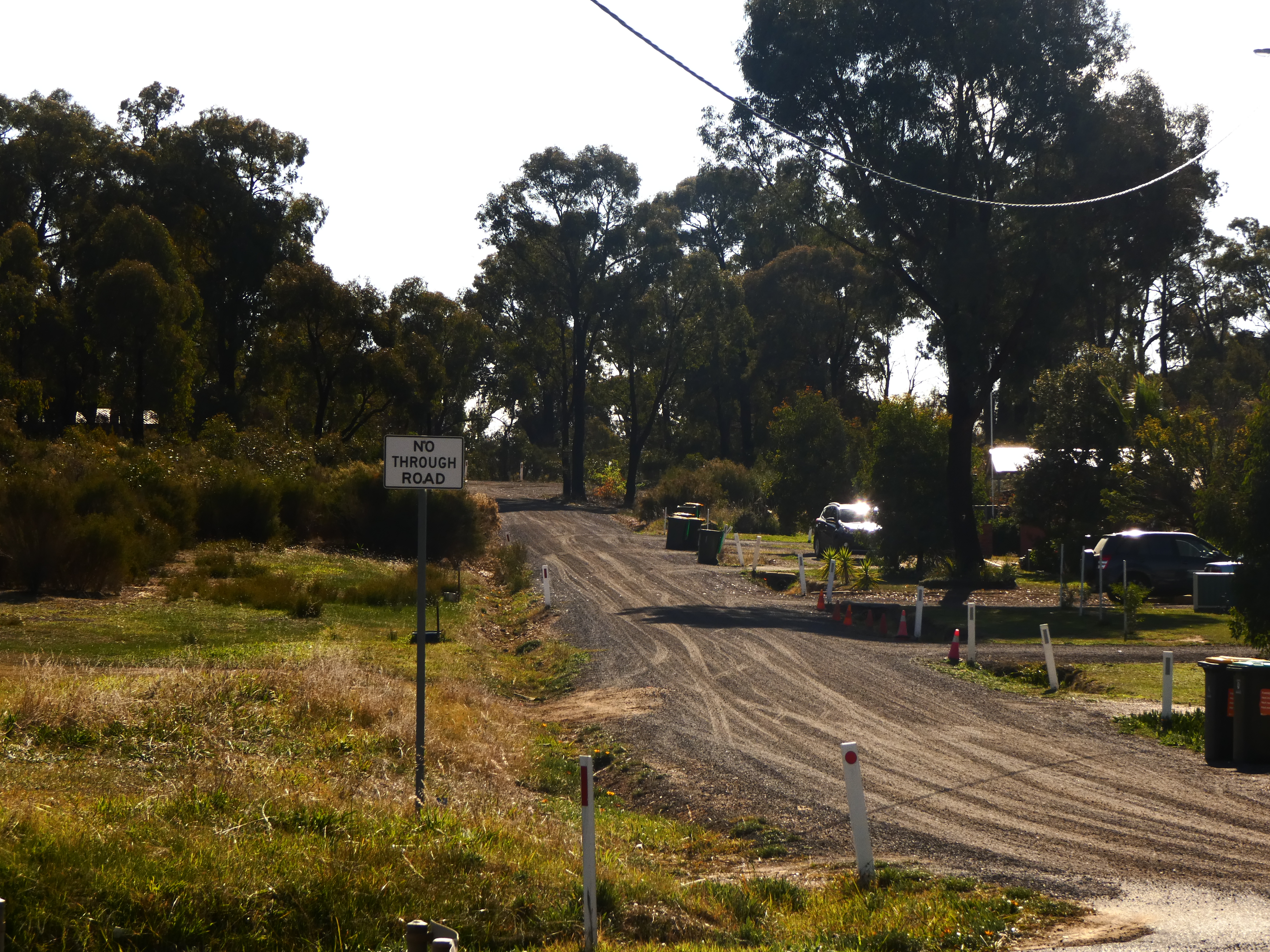
- Saunders Street, May 2026

- Interactive map of West Bendigo
- Coordinates: 36°45′22″S 144°14′58″E
- Country: Australia
- State: Victoria
- City: Bendigo
- LGA: City of Greater Bendigo
- Location: 4.8 km (3.0 mi) W of Bendigo

Government
  - State electorate: Bendigo West
  - Federal division: Bendigo

Population
  - Total: 375 (2016 census)
- Postcode: 3550

West Bendigo is a suburb of the regional city of Bendigo in north central Victoria, Australia, 4.8 kilometres (3.0 mi) west of the Bendigo city centre.

At the 2016 census, West Bendigo had a population of 375. Bendigo Stadium is in West Bendigo.
