= Robert Trethewey =

Australian politician

Robert Hugh Trethewey (17 October 1902 – 31 May 1989) was an Australian politician.

He was born in Eaglehawk to mining engine driver Robert Hugh Trethewey and Louise Turnbull. He received his education at Eaglehawk State School, at Bendigo High School, and at Bendigo Business College. In 1918 he commenced work for the New Zealand Insurance Company (NZI). On 16 October 1926 he married Isabella Nancarrow, with whom he had two sons. He rose through the ranks of NZI and managed branches in Bendigo (1940–46, 1948–62), Maryborough (1946–48) and Toowoomba (1948). In 1964 he was elected to the Victorian Legislative Assembly as the Liberal and Country Party member for Bendigo. He served until his retirement in 1973. Trethewey died in Bendigo in 1989.

Victorian Legislative Assembly
Preceded by Bill Galvin	Member for Bendigo; 1964–1973	Succeeded by Daryl McClure
