= Richard Pope (miner) =

British-Australian mine manager and diarist (1834–1900)

- Born: Richard Pope; 2 May 1834; Trescowe, Breage, Cornwall, United Kingdom
- Died: 23 April 1900 (aged 65); Broken Hill, Colony of New South Wales
- Occupations: Mine manager; engineer
- Spouse: Mary Ann Pope (m. 1858; died 1920)
- Relatives: Jim May

Richard Pope (2 May 1834 – 23 April 1900) was a British-Australian mine manager, engineer, Methodist lay preacher and diarist during the 19th century. He is most known by his diaries that are stored in the State Library Victoria that detailed the way of life in the late 19th century of Australia in the lead up before Federation.

He married Mary Ann Pope (née Andrew) on 12 June 1858 at the age of 24 in Cornwall. Together, they had 13 children with nine surviving to adulthood. He died at the age of 65 in Broken Hill in 1900.

== Overview of life ==
Pope began his early years in Cornwall. In May of 1855, he started writing a diary with many memories of his childhood recorded. He started off his career in the mine shafts of Cornwall. At the age of 21, Pope left Cornwall in search for work in Northern Michigan in the United States. In that role, he became a mine manager and was an engineer by trade. In 1857, Pope returned to Cornwall and married Mary Ann Andrew. He returned to the US in the following year and worked at the coal mines of Virginia. In 1860, Pope travels to Cork, in Southern Ireland, where he was the mine manager of various copper mines. He and his wife give birth to 13 children in their seven years at Cork. In 1868, Pope and his whole family moved to Australia. They settled in Ballarat and Bendigo where Pope managed various gold and quartz mines. In this period of time, Pope detailed the life of the Colony of Victoria following the Victorian Gold Rush of the 1850s. In 1886, Pope and his wife moved to Broken Hill in the Colony of New South Wales where he once again becomes a manager and engineer at the various lead zinc mines in the area.

For a number of years, he traveled to Adelaide as a mine manager there as well. In 1894, Pope holidayed back to Cornwall on a "nostalgic trip" and again in 1895, became a mine manager in South Africa in the Transvaal region. Pope returned to Broken Hill in 1896. The last four years of his life were not detailed as he did not write in his diary. In 1900, he died at the age of 65.

== Legacy ==
Since Richard Pope's death, his diaries remained within the family until the mid 1980s when his great, great, grandson's, James Whitehead and Jim May started digitising the diaries from their handwritten form. The original copies have been subsequently stored in the State Library of Victoria since 1984 with digital copies available since the early 2000s. There have been numerous reports that have used Richard Pope's primary evidence and documentation in a variety of ways since then.
