= Max Turner (politician) =

Australian politician

Maxwell John "Max" Turner (12 February 1947 – 7 July 2026) was an Australian politician.

Born in Bendigo, Victoria, he attended Huntly Primary School and Bendigo High School, leaving in year 10 and working in the building industry from 1963 to 1965. In 1965, he joined the Victoria Police Force's Criminal Investigation Branch, qualifying as a detective. He left the police force in 1982 to open a newsagency in Golden Square, which he owned until 1990. Turner was active in the local community as Secretary of the Golden Square Retail Traders Association (1983–90), President of the Kangaroo Flat Rotary Club (1991–92), and President of the Victorian Authorised Newsagents Bendigo Region.

He joined the Liberal Party in 1988 and was vice-president of the Golden Square branch in 1991, subsequently serving as a state council delegate and member of the provincial and federal electorate committees (1991–93). In the 1992 state election, he was elected to the Victorian Legislative Assembly as the member for Bendigo West, serving until his defeat in 1996. He unsuccessfully contested the federal seat of Bendigo in 1998. Turner was also unsuccessful in seeking Liberal preselection for the electorate of Seymour at the 1999 state election, losing to Di Rule.

Turner died on 7 July 2026.

Parliament of Victoria
Preceded by David Kennedy	Member for Bendigo West; 1992–1996	Succeeded by Bob Cameron
