= Daryl McClure =

Australian politician (1947–2015)

Mayor of the City of Greater Bendigo
- In office 1999–2000
- Preceded by: Maurie Sharkey
- Succeeded by: Laurie Whelan

Councillor of the City of Greater Bendigo for Sandhurst Ward
- In office 1996–2004
- Preceded by: New Seat
- Succeeded by: Wayne Gregson

Member of the Victorian Legislative Assembly for Bendigo
- In office 1973–1982
- Preceded by: Robert Trethewey
- Succeeded by: David Kennedy

Personal details
- Born: 15 February 1947 Bendigo
- Died: 15 March 2015 (aged 68)
- Party: Liberal
- Occupation: Politician

Daryl Hedley Robert McClure (15 February 1947 – 15 March 2015) was an Australian politician.

McClure was born in Bendigo to machinery fitter Ernest John McClure and Jean Hastings. He attended White Hills State School, Bendigo Junior Technical College and Bendigo High School, becoming a television announcer in 1964. On 22 December 1967 he married Carole Anne Rowe, with whom he had two children; they were later divorced. He was secretary of the Bendigo and District Tourist Association from 1967 to 1971 and a Bendigo City Councillor from 1969 to 1970. In 1973 he was elected to the Victorian Legislative Assembly as the Liberal member for Bendigo, serving until his defeat in 1982. After his defeat he became president of the Bendigo branch of the Liberal Party, and returned to the local council in 1996, serving as mayor from 1999 to 2000.
