= David Smith (Victorian politician) =

Australian politician

Member of the Victorian Parliament for Bendigo West
- In office 1904–1924
- Preceded by: New seat
- Succeeded by: Arthur Cook

Personal details
- Born: 18 November 1861 Sheepshead Gully, Victoria
- Died: 24 January 1943 (aged 81) Bendigo, Victoria
- Party: Labor (1904–14); Independent (1914–17); National Labor (1917–20); Nationalist (1920–24)
- Spouse: Agnes Reed
- Children: Sydney Smith; Leslie Smith
- Occupation: Blacksmith

David Smith (18 November 1861 – 24 January 1943) was an Australian politician.

Born at Sheepshead Gully near Bendigo to miner James Smith and Agnes Thompson, he attended schools in Bendigo before becoming a blacksmith, spending periods in Yarraville and Mirboo North. In 1885 at Sandhurst (Bendigo) he married Annie Elizabeth Reed, with whom he had two sons, Sydney and Leslie.

In December 1903, he stood unsuccessfully for the federal seat of Bendigo, the first election at which it was contested, losing to the sitting member, Sir John Quick

In 1904 he was elected to the Victorian Legislative Assembly as the Labor member for Bendigo West. Appointed Minister without Portfolio in 1913, he was expelled from the Labor Party in 1914 after supporting the teaching of scripture lessons in state schools. In 1916 he joined the National Labor Party and was a Nationalist from 1917. Smith left the Assembly in 1924 and died in 1943.

Victorian Legislative Assembly
District created	Member for Bendigo West; 1904–1924	Succeeded by Arthur Cook
