= Arthur Cook (Australian politician) =

Australian politician (1883–1945)

Arthur E. Cook
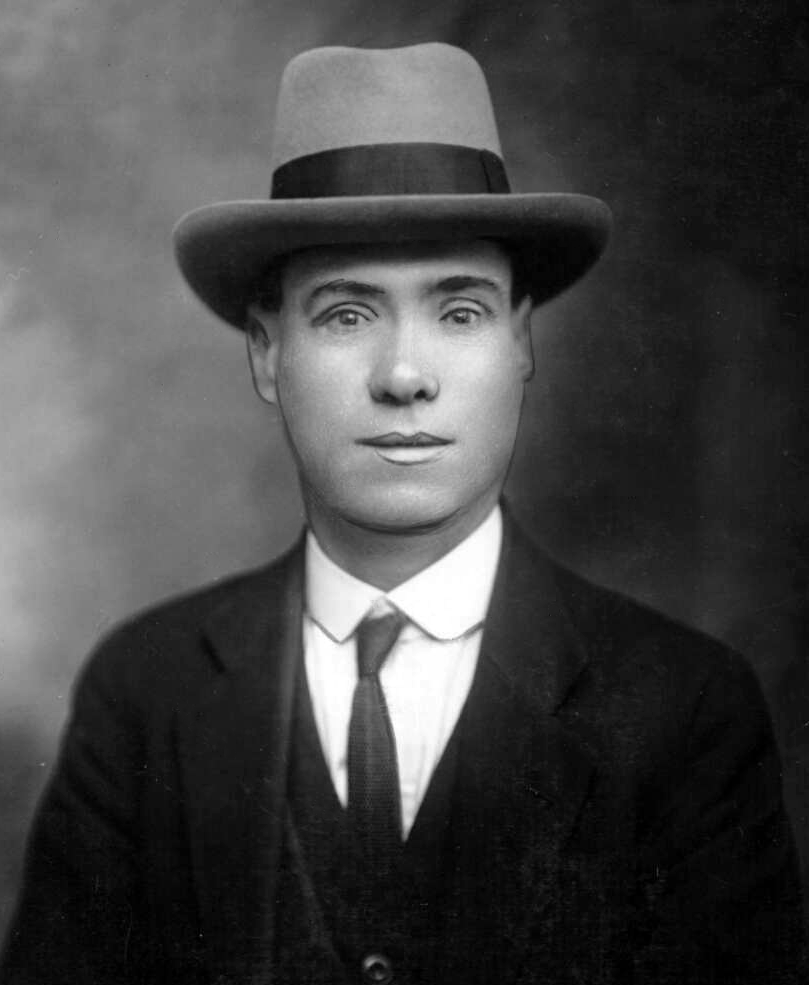
- Arthur Cook, 1924

Personal details
- Born: 6 September 1883 Sandhurst, Victoria, Australia
- Died: 10 April 1945 (aged 61) Melbourne, VIC, Australia
- Party: Australian Labor Party
- Education: Gravel Hill State School
- Occupation: Public Servant; Hairdresser

Arthur Ernest Cook (6 September 1883 – 10 April 1945) was an Australian politician. He was born in Sandhurst to engine driver Robert Cook and Mary Daley, and attended state school before becoming a hairdresser. He owned his own business in Bendigo from around 1901. On 28 April 1909 he married Mary Victoria Rocke, with whom he had four children.

Cook served as vice-president of the Bendigo Trades Hall Council and was on the Labor Party's state executive from 1916 to 1918. In 1924, he was elected to the Victorian Legislative Assembly as the Labor member for Bendigo West, transferring to Bendigo in 1927.

Cook served until his death at Parliament House in Melbourne in 1945. One of his grandsons, Esmond Curnow, later served in the Assembly.

Victorian Legislative Assembly
| Preceded by David Smith | Member for Bendigo West; 1924–1927 | Abolished |
| New seat | Member for Bendigo; 1927–1945 | Succeeded by Bill Galvin |
