= Electoral district of Bendigo West =

State electoral district of Victoria, Australia

Bendigo West Victoria—Legislative Assembly
- Interactive map of electoral district boundaries from the 2022 state election
- State: Victoria
- Dates current: 1904–1927; 1985–present
- MP: Maree Edwards
- Party: Labor
- Namesake: West Bendigo
- Electors: 47,808 (2022)
- Area: 1,524 km^{2} (588.4 sq mi)
- Demographic: Provincial and rural
- Coordinates: 36°57′S 144°6′E
Electorates around Bendigo West:
Ripon	Ripon	Bendigo East
Ripon	Bendigo West	Bendigo East
Ripon	Macedon	Macedon

Bendigo West is an electoral district of the Legislative Assembly in the Australian state of Victoria. It is a 1,524-square-kilometre (588 sq mi) electorate, centred on the city of Bendigo west of the Yungera railway line, and includes surrounding rural towns to the west and south-west. It encompasses the localities of Bendigo City, California Gully, Castlemaine, Harcourt, Long Gully, Maldon, Marong, Newstead and West Bendigo. It also includes parts of the Bendigo suburbs of Eaglehawk, Golden Square and Kangaroo Flat. It lies within the Northern Victoria Region of the upper house, the Legislative Council.

Bendigo West has generally been a safe seat for the Labor Party. It was created in 1904, when it was won by Labor candidate David Smith by 18 votes. Smith was re-elected several times, but was expelled from the party in 1911 over his support for introducing scripture lessons into state schools. He sat as an independent until the Labor Party split of 1917, after which he joined Billy Hughes' rival National Labor Party, which subsequently became the Nationalist Party of Australia. Smith did not contest the 1924 election, and the seat returned to the Labor fold, being won by Arthur Cook. The seat was merged with Bendigo East in 1927, with Cook going on to serve as the member for Bendigo.

The electorate was recreated as a separate district in 1985, when it was won by former federal MP David Kennedy. Kennedy was defeated by Liberal Max Turner amidst the Liberal landslide win at the 1992 state election, but Turner lasted only one term before being defeated by Labor candidate Bob Cameron in 1996. Cameron was comfortably re-elected in 1999, 2002, and 2006, and left a margin of more than 10% for Maree Edwards to defend at the 2010 election. He served as Minister for Emergency Services in the Brumby government.

== Members for Bendigo West ==
First incarnation (1904–1927)
Member	Party	Term
David Smith	Labour	1904–1914
David Smith	Independent	1914–1916
David Smith	National Labor	1916–1917
David Smith	Nationalist	1917–1924
Arthur Cook	Labor	1924–1927
Second incarnation (1985–present)
Member	Party	Term
David Kennedy	Labor	1985–1992
Max Turner	Liberal	1992–1996
Bob Cameron	Labor	1996–2010
Maree Edwards	Labor	2010–present

== Election results ==
2022 Victorian state election: Bendigo West
Party	Candidate	Votes	%	±%
Labor	Maree Edwards	18,704	46.5	−7.0
Liberal	Ken Price	10,057	25.0	−2.1
Greens	James Searle	4,634	11.5	−1.5
Legalise Cannabis	Wayne Taylor	2,175	5.4	+5.4
Family First	Steve Serpell	1,704	4.2	+4.2
Animal Justice	Victoria Maxwell	1,040	2.6	−3.8
Independent	Matt Bansemer	979	2.4	+2.4
Freedom	Richard James Woolley	606	1.5	+1.5
Independent	Marilyn Nuske	349	0.9	+0.9
Total formal votes		40,248	94.4	−0.7
Informal votes		2,401	5.6	+0.7
Turnout		42,649	89.2	−2.0
Two-party-preferred result
Labor	Maree Edwards	25,999	64.6	−4.0
Liberal	Ken Price	14,249	35.4	+4.0
Labor hold		Swing	−4.0	

Two-party-preferred vote results in Bendigo West View source data.
