= David Kennedy (Australian politician) =

Australian politician

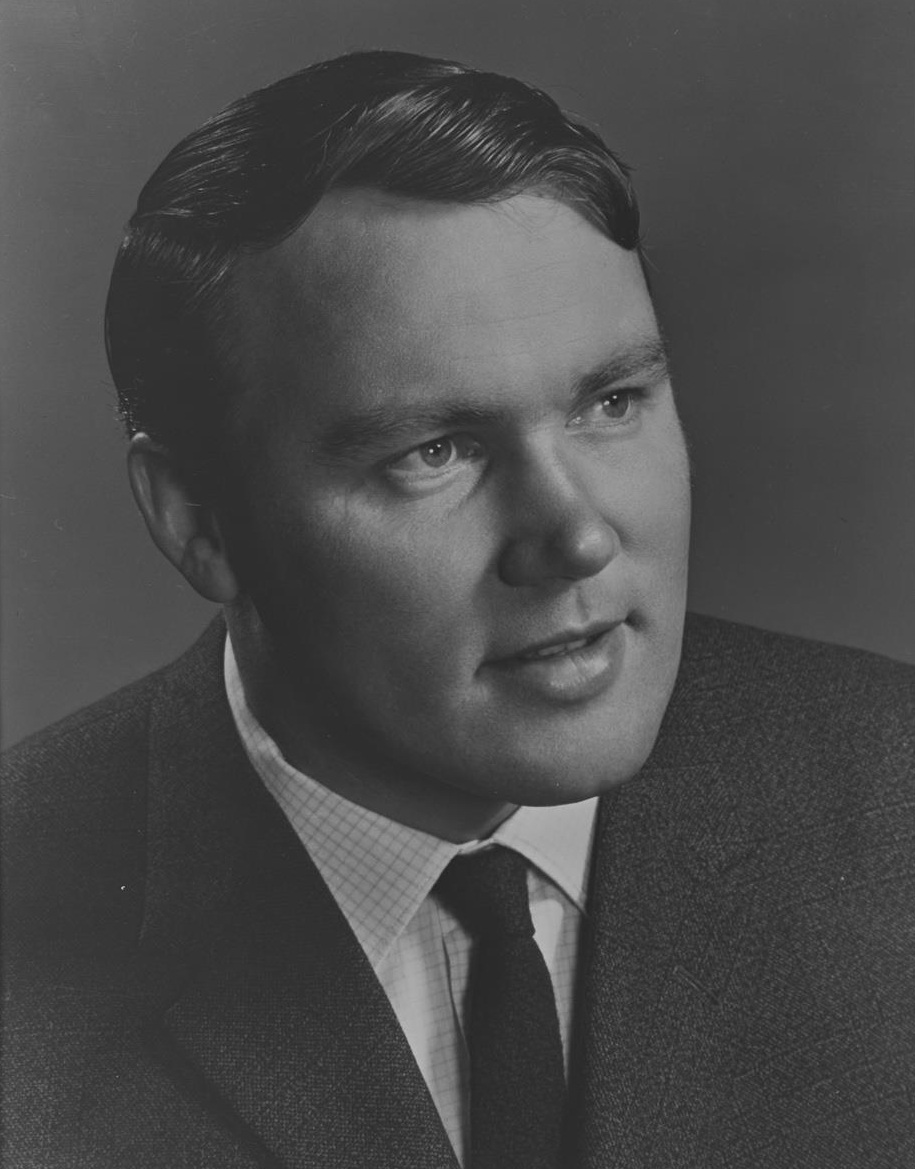
- Kennedy in 1971

Member of the Victorian Legislative Assembly
- In office 2 March 1985 – 2 October 1992
- Preceded by: New seat
- Succeeded by: Max Turner
- Constituency: Bendigo West
- In office 3 April 1982 – 2 March 1985
- Preceded by: Daryl McClure
- Succeeded by: Abolished
- Constituency: Bendigo

Member of the Australian Parliament for Bendigo
- In office 7 June 1969 – 2 December 1972
- Preceded by: Noel Beaton
- Succeeded by: John Bourchier

Personal details
- Born: 20 March 1940 (age 86) Ulverstone, Tasmania, Australia
- Party: Labor
- Relations: Cyril Kennedy
- Education: University of Melbourne
- Occupation: Schoolteacher

Andrew David Kennedy (born 20 March 1940) is an Australian radio broadcaster and former politician. He was a member of the House of Representatives from 1969 to 1972, representing the Division of Bendigo for the Australian Labor Party (ALP). He later served in the Victorian Legislative Assembly from 1982 to 1992, representing the seats of Bendigo (1982–1985) and Bendigo West (1985–1992). He was a schoolteacher prior to entering politics.

== Early life ==
Kennedy was born on 20 March 1940 in Ulverstone, Tasmania. His older brother Cyril Kennedy was also a member of parliament and the brothers served together in the Victorian state parliament for a decade.

Kennedy is a fifth-generation descendant (great-great-great-grandchildren) of Mannalargenna, a 19th-century Aboriginal Tasmanian leader. His ancestry "was unknown when he entered parliament, nor did he self-identify as Indigenous at that time". Some sources nonetheless include him and his brother in lists of Indigenous parliamentarians, although Neville Bonner, who became a senator two years after Kennedy's election to parliament, is typically regarded as the first Indigenous member of the federal parliament.

Kennedy spent his early years in Tasmania, attending a Catholic primary school in Ulverstone. His family later moved to Melbourne where he attended Catholic primary schools in Burnley and Richmond and a public school in Hawthorn. He completed his secondary education at University High School, Melbourne. Kennedy went on to the University of Melbourne graduating with a Bachelor of Arts (Hons.) and completing a diploma in education. He subsequently worked as a teacher at Bendigo High School from 1963 to 1969.

== Federal politics ==
Kennedy joined the Australian Labor Party at a young age and was president of the Bendigo branch of Young Labor. He also worked as a public relations officer for the party.

Kennedy was elected to the House of Representatives at the 1969 Bendigo by-election, narrowly retaining the seat of Bendigo for the ALP following the retirement of Noel Beaton. He was 29 at the time of his election and became the youngest member of the ALP caucus. He retained his seat with an increased majority at the 1969 election.

In parliament, Kennedy spoke frequently on education matters and was an advocate for a regional university to be established in Bendigo. He was critical of the McMahon government's Capital Aid Scheme, which gave government grants to private schools for capital works programs, and in May 1972 released a list of private schools formerly attended by cabinet ministers which had received grants under the scheme. Kennedy accused the government of "squandering large sums of public money on building more refuges for the rich" and that it had produced a "two-class system of education apartheid". His views brought him into conflict with federal education minister Malcolm Fraser on several occasions.

Kennedy was defeated by the Liberal candidate John Bourchier at the 1972 election, which saw the ALP return to government for the first time since 1949. During the election campaign he was opposed by the Catholic Church for his support of legal abortion and opposition to state aid to Catholic schools. According to The Canberra Times, the local Catholic bishop Bernard Denis Stewart "virtually ordered Catholics to vote against Labor". Kennedy's campaign was also affected by the decision of the Country Party to stand a candidate in Bendigo for the first time since 1946.

Kennedy worked as press secretary to overseas trade minister Jim Cairns for a period after his defeat. He unsuccessfully sought re-election to Bendigo at the 1974 election, losing in a rematch to Bourchier.

== State politics ==
After his defeat Kennedy returned to his previous work as a schoolteacher. He was also president of the Eaglehawk & Long Gully Community Health Centre, a director of the Kangaroo Flat and Bendigo Co-operative Housing Society, and served on the committee of the Music Advancement Society of Bendigo.

Kennedy was elected to the Victorian Legislative Assembly at the 1982 state election, winning the seat of Bendigo from the incumbent Liberal member Daryl McClure. His seat was subsequently abolished and he transferred to the new seat of Bendigo West at the 1985 election.

Kennedy remained a backbencher throughout his time in state parliament. At the 1988 election his majority was reduced to only a few hundred votes. A redistribution prior to the 1992 election gave Bendigo West a notional National Party majority, and Kennedy was ultimately defeated by the Liberal candidate Max Turner.

== Later activities ==
In 1986, Kennedy began broadcasting a classic music program on Harcourt radio station 3CCC. He later helped established Bendigo community radio station Phoenix FM and celebrated his program's 30th anniversary in 2016.

Parliament of Australia
Preceded by Noel Beaton	Member for Bendigo; 1969–1972	Succeeded by John Bourchier
Victorian Legislative Assembly
Preceded by Daryl McClure	Member for Bendigo; 1982–1985	District abolished
District created	Member for Bendigo West; 1985–1992	Succeeded by Max Turner
