= Candidates of the 1927 Victorian state election =

The 1927 Victorian state election was held on 9 April 1927.

== Seat changes ==
- Abbotsford Labor MLA Gordon Webber contested Heidelberg.
- Ballarat East Labor MLA William McAdam contested Ballarat.
- Ballarat West Nationalist MLA Matthew Baird contested Ballarat.
- Bendigo West Labor MLA Arthur Cook contested Bendigo.
- Boroondara Nationalist MLA Edmund Greenwood contested Nunawading.
- Bulla Labor MLA Ralph Hjorth contested Grant.
- Castlemaine and Maldon Nationalist MLA Harry Lawson contested Castlemaine and Kyneton.
- Dalhousie Labor MLA Reg Pollard contested Bulla and Dalhousie.
- Daylesford Labor MLA James McDonald contested Mildura.
- Eaglehawk Country Progressive MLA Albert Dunstan contested Eaglehawk.
- East Melbourne Nationalist MLA Alfred Farthing contested Caulfield.
- Essendon Labor MLA Frank Keane contested Coburg.
- Fitzroy Labor MLA Maurice Blackburn contested Clifton Hill.
- Glenelg Labor MLA Ernie Bond contested Port Fairy and Glenelg.
- Grenville Labor MLA Arthur Hughes contested Hampden.
- Jika Jika Labor MLA John Cain contested Northcote.
- Kara Kara Nationalist MLA John Pennington contested Kara Kara and Borung.
- Korong Country MLA Isaac Weaver contested Korong and Eaglehawk.
- Maryborough Labor MLA George Frost contested Maryborough and Daylesford.
- North Melbourne Labor MLA George Prendergast contested Footscray.
- Port Fairy Labor MLA Henry Bailey contested Warrnambool.
- Wangaratta Country MLA Sir John Bowser contested Wangaratta and Ovens.
- Warrenheip Labor MLA Edmond Hogan contested Warrenheip and Grenville.

== Retiring Members ==
- Note: Warrnambool Nationalist MLA James Deany died a month before the election; no by-election was held due to the proximity of the general election.

=== Labor ===
- Luke Clough MLA (Bendigo East)

=== Nationalist ===
- Alfred Billson MLA (Ovens)
- John Gordon MLA (Waranga)

=== Country ===
- David Allison MLA (Borung)

== Legislative Assembly ==
Sitting members are shown in bold text. Successful candidates are highlighted in the relevant colour. Where there is possible confusion, an asterisk (*) is also used.

Electorate	Held by	Labor candidates	Nationalist candidates	Country candidates	Other candidates
Albert Park	Labor	**Arthur Wallace**	Robert Cuthbertson		Charles Merrett (Lib)
Allandale	Nationalist	William McGrath	**Sir Alexander Peacock**		
Ballarat	Labor	**William McAdam**	**Matthew Baird**		
Barwon	Nationalist	John Jensen	**Edward Morley**		
Benalla	Country			Patrick Connell	**John Carlisle** (Ind); Edward Cleary* (CPP)
Benambra	Nationalist		**Henry Beardmore**		
Bendigo	Labor	**Arthur Cook**	William Ewing		
Boroondara	Nationalist	Robert Dodman	Richard Linton		David Evans (Ind); Victor Ginn (Lib); Louis Holmes (Ind Nat); Robert Sylvester (Ind Nat)
Brighton	Liberal				**Oswald Snowball** (Ind Nat)
Brunswick	Labor	**James Jewell**	Leonard Smith		
Bulla and Dalhousie	Labor	**Reg Pollard**	Andrew Rowan	Alexander Wilson	John Murphy (Lib)
Carlton	Labor	**Robert Solly**			Roderick McSolvin (Lib)
Castlemaine and Kyneton	Nationalist	Joseph Hannan	**Harry Lawson**		
Caulfield	Nationalist		**Alfred Farthing**		Frederick Forrest* (Lib); John Packer (Lib)
Clifton Hill	Labor	**Maurice Blackburn**	Charles Miller		
Coburg	Labor	**Frank Keane**	Henry Richards		
Collingwood	Labor	**Tom Tunnecliffe**	Ralph Stredwick		
Dandenong	Nationalist	James O'Keefe	**Frank Groves**		Archibald Wilson (Lib)
Dundas	Labor	**Bill Slater**	Gilbert Smith		
Essendon	Labor	Arthur Drakeford	Robert Gilbertson		
Evelyn	Liberal	Edward Hodges			**William Everard*** (Ind Nat); Joseph Smith (Lib)
Flemington	Labor	**Jack Holland**	Arthur Fenton		
Footscray	Labor	**George Prendergast**			
Geelong	Labor	**William Brownbill**	Julius Solomon		
Gippsland East	Country			**Albert Lind**	Frederick Blight (Ind)
Gippsland North	Independent			John Buchan	**James McLachlan** (Ind)
Gippsland South	Nationalist	Michael Buckley	**Walter West**	Thomas Anderson; David White	Henry Bodman (Ind)
Gippsland West	Country	Thomas Houlihan	James Wilson	**Arthur Walter**	Arthur a'Beckett (Ind); John Dowd (CPP); Robert Garlick (Lib)
Goulburn Valley	Country			**Murray Bourchier**	
Grant	Labor	**Ralph Hjorth**	Francis Connelly	David Gibson	James Farrer (Ind)
Gunbower	Liberal				**Henry Angus*** (Ind Nat); Farquhar Matheson (CPP)
Hampden	Nationalist	**Arthur Hughes**	**David Oman**		
Hawthorn	Nationalist	Edward Cummins	**Sir William McPherson**		
Heidelberg	Labor	**Gordon Webber**	Henry Zwar		
Kara Kara and Borung	Nationalist		**John Pennington**	William Pearce	Finlay Cameron (CPP)
Kew	Nationalist	Frederick Riley	Edward Reynolds		William Clark (Lib); Wilfrid Kent Hughes* (Prog Nat)
Korong and Eaglehawk	Country			**Isaac Weaver**	**Albert Dunstan** (CPP)
Lowan	Country			**Marcus Wettenhall**	George Clyne (CPP)
Maryborough and Daylesford	Labor	**George Frost**	Edmund Jowett		
Melbourne	Labor	**Tom Hayes**			Carlyle Ferguson (Lib)
Mildura	Labor	James McDonald		James Lochhead	Albert Allnutt (CPP)
Mornington	Country		Alfred Kirton	**Alfred Downward**	Cyril Croskell (Lib)
Northcote	Labor	**John Cain**			
Nunawading	Nationalist	John Toohey	**Edmund Greenwood***; Garnet Soilleux		Robert Halliday (Lib); Stephen Thompson (Lib)
Oakleigh	Labor	Squire Reid	Robert Knox		Thomas Riley (Lib)
Ouyen	Country	Francis Williamson		Henry Pickering	Harold Glowrey (CPP)
Polwarth	Nationalist		**James McDonald**		
Port Fairy and Glenelg	Labor	**Ernie Bond**	William Shaw		
Port Melbourne	Labor	**James Murphy**			
Prahran	Labor	**Arthur Jackson**	Thomas White		
Richmond	Labor	**Ted Cotter**			
Rodney	Country			**John Allan**	Percy Bryce (Lib); Frederick Churches (CPP)
St Kilda	Nationalist		**Frederic Eggleston**		Burnett Gray* (Lib); Florence Johnson (Ind Lab)
Stawell and Ararat	Nationalist	Robert McCracken	**Richard Toutcher**		
Swan Hill	Country			**Francis Old**	Ernest Gray (CPP); William Sullivan (Ind)
Toorak	Nationalist	Charles Cope	**Stanley Argyle**		Horace Mason (Lib)
Upper Goulburn	Country	Edward Withers	George Wilson	**Edwin Mackrell**	
Upper Yarra	Nationalist	Henry Courtney	George Knox	John Dedman	Henry Glynn (Ind); George Ingram (Lib); John Mahony (Ind Nat)
Walhalla	Nationalist	James Bermingham	**Samuel Barnes**	William Moncur	
Wangaratta and Ovens	Country			**Sir John Bowser***; Lot Diffey	William Higgins (Lib)
Waranga	Nationalist	Gerald Honan	Ernest Coyle*; Henry Thomas	John McKee	
Warrenheip and Grenville	Labor	**Edmond Hogan**	Robert McGregor		
Warrnambool	Nationalist	**Henry Bailey**	James Swan		William Downing (Lib)
Williamstown	Labor	**John Lemmon**	Francis Wilcher		
Wonthaggi	Labor	William McKenzie	William Walker	Peter Hudson; Herbert Hyland	William Easton (Lib)

== See also ==
- 1928 Victorian Legislative Council election
