= Results of the 1927 Victorian state election (Legislative Assembly) =

Australian vote counts by district

Victorian state election, 9 April 1927 Legislative Assembly << 1924–1929 >>
Enrolled voters	850,494				
Votes cast	780,399		Turnout	91.76	+32.53
Informal votes	15,125		Informal	1.94	+0.93
Summary of votes by party
Party	Primary votes	%	Swing	Seats	Change
Labor	319,848	41.79	+6.92	28	+1
Nationalist	236,428	30.89	−8.15	15	−4
Australian Liberal	67,663	8.84	+8.84	2	+2
Country	62,218	8.13	−3.84	10	−3
Country Progressive	31,849	4.16	+4.16	4	+4
Independent	51,642	8.16	+1.98	3	−3
Total	765,274			65	

This is a list of electoral district results for the 1927 Victorian state election.

== Results by electoral district ==
=== Albert Park ===
1927 Victorian state election: Albert Park
Party	Candidate	Votes	%	±%
Labor	Arthur Wallace	9,581	46.5	
Nationalist	Robert Cuthbertson	7,044	34.1	
Australian Liberal	Charles Merrett	4,002	19.4	
Total formal votes		20,627	97.5	
Informal votes		541	2.5	
Turnout		21,168	89.3	
Two-party-preferred result
Nationalist	Robert Cuthbertson	10,338	50.1	
Labor	Arthur Wallace	10,289	49.9	
Nationalist gain from Labor		Swing		

=== Allandale ===
1927 Victorian state election: Allandale
Party	Candidate	Votes	%	±%
Nationalist	Alexander Peacock	5,053	56.2	
Labor	William McGrath	3,938	43.8	
Total formal votes		8,991	97.0	
Informal votes		275	3.0	
Turnout		9,266	95.4	
Nationalist hold		Swing		

=== Ballarat ===
1927 Victorian state election: Ballarat
Party	Candidate	Votes	%	±%
Labor	William McAdam	8,313	53.6	
Nationalist	Matthew Baird	7,203	46.4	
Total formal votes		15,516	99.0	
Informal votes		162	1.0	
Turnout		15,678	94.9	
Labor hold		Swing		

=== Barwon ===
1927 Victorian state election: Barwon
Party	Candidate	Votes	%	±%
Nationalist	Edward Morley	6,637	64.2	
Labor	John Jensen	3,703	35.8	
Total formal votes		10,340	98.6	
Informal votes		146	1.4	
Turnout		10,486	91.6	
Nationalist hold		Swing		

=== Benalla ===
1927 Victorian state election: Benalla
Party	Candidate	Votes	%	±%
Country Progressive	Edward Cleary	3,406	38.7	
Independent	John Carlisle	3,201	36.3	
Country	Patrick Connell	2,200	25.0	
Total formal votes		8,807	97.8	
Informal votes		203	2.2	
Turnout		9,010	92.7	
Two-candidate-preferred result
Country Progressive	Edward Cleary	4,413	50.1	
Independent	John Carlisle	4,394	49.9	
Country Progressive gain from Country		Swing	N/A	

=== Benambra ===
1927 Victorian state election: Benambra
Party	Candidate	Votes	%	±%
Nationalist	Henry Beardmore	unopposed		
Nationalist hold		Swing		

=== Bendigo ===
1927 Victorian state election: Bendigo
Party	Candidate	Votes	%	±%
Labor	Arthur Cook	8,954	62.7	
Nationalist	William Ewing	5,331	37.3	
Total formal votes		14,285	98.9	
Informal votes		171	1.1	
Turnout		14,456	67.7	
Labor hold		Swing		

=== Boroondara ===
1927 Victorian state election: Boroondara
Party	Candidate	Votes	%	±%
Nationalist	Richard Linton	7,712	39.7	
Labor	Robert Dodman	5,542	28.5	
Independent	David Evans	1,644	8.5	
Ind. Nationalist	Robert Sylvester	1,590	8.2	
Australian Liberal	Victor Ginn	1,573	8.1	
Independent	Louis Holmes	1,375	7.1	
Total formal votes		19,436	96.1	
Informal votes		798	3.9	
Turnout		20,234	92.7	
Two-party-preferred result
Nationalist	Richard Linton	12,125	63.4	
Labor	Robert Dodman	7,311	37.6	
Nationalist hold		Swing		

=== Brighton ===
1927 Victorian state election: Brighton
Party	Candidate	Votes	%	±%
Ind. Nationalist	Oswald Snowball	unopposed		
Member changed to Ind. Nationalist from Australian Liberal		Swing	N/A	

=== Brunswick ===
1927 Victorian state election: Brunswick
Party	Candidate	Votes	%	±%
Labor	James Jewell	16,204	76.1	
Nationalist	Leonard Smith	5,102	23.9	
Total formal votes		21,306	98.3	
Informal votes		363	1.7	
Turnout		21,669	94.2	
Labor hold		Swing		

=== Bulla and Dalhousie ===
1927 Victorian state election: Bulla and Dalhousie
Party	Candidate	Votes	%	±%
Labor	Reg Pollard	4,183	48.0	
Nationalist	Andrew Rowan	1,774	20.4	
Country	Alexander Wilson	1,625	18.6	
Australian Liberal	John Murphy	1,131	13.0	
Total formal votes		8,713	98.2	
Informal votes		159	1.8	
Turnout		8,872	89.0	
After distribution of preferences
Labor	Reg Pollard	4,695	53.9	
Nationalist	Andrew Rowan	2,118	24.3	
Country	Alexander Wilson	1,900	21.8	
Labor hold		Swing		

- Preferences were not distributed to completion.

=== Carlton ===
1927 Victorian state election: Carlton
Party	Candidate	Votes	%	±%
Labor	Robert Solly	14,470	73.9	
Australian Liberal	Roderick McSolvin	5,102	26.1	
Total formal votes		19,572	98.3	
Informal votes		332	1.7	
Turnout		19,904	90.3	
Labor hold		Swing		

=== Castlemaine and Kyneton ===
1927 Victorian state election: Castlemaine and Kyneton
Party	Candidate	Votes	%	±%
Nationalist	Harry Lawson	5,546	60.3	
Labor	Joseph Hannan	3,658	39.7	
Total formal votes		9,204	99.0	
Informal votes		96	1.0	
Turnout		9,300	93.7	
Nationalist hold		Swing		

=== Caulfield ===
1927 Victorian state election: Caulfield
Party	Candidate	Votes	%	±%
Australian Liberal	Frederick Forrest	8,953	42.6	
Nationalist	Alfred Farthing	6,329	30.1	
Australian Liberal	John Packer	5,715	27.2	
Total formal votes		20,997	96.9	
Informal votes		679	3.1	
Turnout		21,676	92.7	
Two-candidate-preferred result
Australian Liberal	Frederick Forrest	13,640	65.0	
Nationalist	Alfred Farthing	7,357	35.0	
Australian Liberal gain from Nationalist		Swing		

=== Clifton Hill ===
1927 Victorian state election: Clifton Hill
Party	Candidate	Votes	%	±%
Labor	Maurice Blackburn	13,784	67.7	
Nationalist	Charles Miller	6,577	32.3	
Total formal votes		20,361	96.4	
Informal votes		763	3.6	
Turnout		21,124	86.8	
Labor hold		Swing		

=== Coburg ===
1927 Victorian state election: Coburg
Party	Candidate	Votes	%	±%
Labor	Frank Keane	13,005	67.5	
Nationalist	Henry Richards	6,256	32.5	
Total formal votes		19,261	99.1	
Informal votes		183	0.9	
Turnout		19,444	94.7	
Labor hold		Swing		

=== Collingwood ===
1927 Victorian state election: Collingwood
Party	Candidate	Votes	%	±%
Labor	Tom Tunnecliffe	16,392	77.2	
Nationalist	Ralph Stredwick	4,843	22.8	
Total formal votes		21,235	98.2	
Informal votes		391	1.8	
Turnout		21,626	90.6	
Labor hold		Swing		

=== Dandenong ===
1927 Victorian state election: Dandenong
Party	Candidate	Votes	%	±%
Labor	James O'Keefe	8,160	44.8	
Nationalist	Frank Groves	7,612	41.7	
Australian Liberal	Archibald Wilson	2,458	13.5	
Total formal votes		18,230	97.2	
Informal votes		518	2.8	
Turnout		18,748	91.1	
Two-party-preferred result
Nationalist	Frank Groves	9,292	51.0	
Labor	James O'Keefe	8,938	49.0	
Nationalist hold		Swing		

=== Dundas ===
1927 Victorian state election: Dundas
Party	Candidate	Votes	%	±%
Labor	Bill Slater	5,675	56.9	
Nationalist	Gilbert Smith	4,304	43.1	
Total formal votes		9,979	99.3	
Informal votes		73	0.7	
Turnout		10,052	95.1	
Labor hold		Swing		

=== Essendon ===
1927 Victorian state election: Essendon
Party	Candidate	Votes	%	±%
Labor	Arthur Drakeford	10,196	52.4	
Nationalist	Robert Gilbertson	9,254	47.6	
Total formal votes		19,450	99.3	
Informal votes		144	0.7	
Turnout		19,594	94.8	
Labor hold		Swing		

=== Evelyn ===
1927 Victorian state election: Evelyn
Party	Candidate	Votes	%	±%
Ind. Nationalist	William Everard	4,468	53.4	
Labor	Edward Hodges	2,404	28.8	
Australian Liberal	Joseph Smith	1,487	17.8	
Total formal votes		8,359	97.4	
Informal votes		228	2.6	
Turnout		8,587	90.4	
Ind. Nationalist gain from Australian Liberal		Swing		

=== Flemington ===
1927 Victorian state election: Flemington
Party	Candidate	Votes	%	±%
Labor	Jack Holland	13,811	70.1	
Nationalist	Arthur Fenton	5,898	29.9	
Total formal votes		19,709	98.8	
Informal votes		238	1.2	
Turnout		19,947	92.0	
Labor hold		Swing		

=== Footscray ===
1927 Victorian state election: Footscray
Party	Candidate	Votes	%	±%
Labor	George Prendergast	unopposed		
Labor hold		Swing		

=== Geelong ===
1927 Victorian state election: Geelong
Party	Candidate	Votes	%	±%
Labor	William Brownbill	9,317	57.3	
Nationalist	Julius Solomon	6,940	42.7	
Total formal votes		16,257	99.0	
Informal votes		160	1.0	
Turnout		16,417	93.2	
Labor hold		Swing		

=== Gippsland East ===
1927 Victorian state election: Gippsland East
Party	Candidate	Votes	%	±%
Country	Albert Lind	4,344	70.1	
Independent	Frederick Blight	1,855	29.9	
Total formal votes		6,199	98.9	
Informal votes		69	1.1	
Turnout		6,268	89.0	
Country hold		Swing		

=== Gippsland North ===
1927 Victorian state election: Gippsland North
Party	Candidate	Votes	%	±%
Independent	James McLachlan	7,655	84.3	
Country	John Buchan	1,419	15.6	
Total formal votes		9,063	98.9	
Informal votes		105	1.1	
Turnout		9,168	92.0	
Independent hold		Swing		

=== Gippsland South ===
1927 Victorian state election: Gippsland South
Party	Candidate	Votes	%	±%
Nationalist	Walter West	2,727	30.4	
Labor	Michael Buckley	2,126	23.7	
Independent	Henry Bodman	1,821	20.3	
Country	Thomas Anderson	1,448	16.2	
Country	David White	838	9.3	
Total formal votes		8,960	96.7	
Informal votes		303	3.3	
Turnout		9,263	92.2	
Two-candidate-preferred result
Independent	Henry Bodman	4,621	51.6	
Nationalist	Walter West	4,339	48.4	
Independent gain from Nationalist		Swing		

=== Gippsland West ===
1927 Victorian state election: Gippsland West
Party	Candidate	Votes	%	±%
Labor	Thomas Houlihan	3,299	37.2	
Country	Arthur Walter	2,006	22.6	
Nationalist	James Wilson	1,793	20.2	
Independent	Arthur a'Beckett	768	8.7	
Country Progressive	John Dowd	579	6.5	
Australian Liberal	Robert Garlick	424	4.8	
Total formal votes		8,869	96.3	
Informal votes		339	3.7	
Turnout		9,208	91.5	
Two-party-preferred result
Country	Arthur Walter	4,673	52.7	
Labor	Thomas Houlihan	4,196	47.3	
Country hold		Swing		

=== Goulburn Valley ===
1927 Victorian state election: Goulburn Valley
Party	Candidate	Votes	%	±%
Country	Murray Bourchier	unopposed		
Country hold		Swing		

=== Grant ===
1927 Victorian state election: Grant
Party	Candidate	Votes	%	±%
Labor	Ralph Hjorth	3,963	47.8	
Nationalist	Francis Connelly	2,070	25.0	
Country	David Gibson	1,763	21.3	
Independent	James Farrer	489	5.9	
Total formal votes		8,285	98.4	
Informal votes		131	1.6	
Turnout		8,416	91.8	
Two-party-preferred result
Labor	Ralph Hjorth	4,420	53.4	
Nationalist	Francis Connelly	3,865	46.6	
Labor hold		Swing		

=== Gunbower ===
1927 Victorian state election: Gunbower
Party	Candidate	Votes	%	±%
Independent	Henry Angus	5,889	61.4	
Country Progressive	Farquhar Matheson	3,696	38.6	
Total formal votes		9,585	98.8	
Informal votes		118	1.2	
Turnout		9,703	90.5	
Independent gain from Australian Liberal		Swing		

=== Hampden ===
1927 Victorian state election: Hampden
Party	Candidate	Votes	%	±%
Labor	Arthur Hughes	5,071	53.6	
Nationalist	David Oman	4,396	46.4	
Total formal votes		9,467	99.0	
Informal votes		96	1.0	
Turnout		9,563	92.3	
Labor gain from Nationalist		Swing		

=== Hawthorn ===
1927 Victorian state election: Hawthorn
Party	Candidate	Votes	%	±%
Nationalist	William McPherson	11,610	57.6	
Labor	Edward Cummins	8,555	42.4	
Total formal votes		20,165	98.7	
Informal votes		268	1.3	
Turnout		20,433	94.4	
Nationalist hold		Swing		

=== Heidelberg ===
1927 Victorian state election: Heidelberg
Party	Candidate	Votes	%	±%
Labor	Gordon Webber	10,924	54.4	
Nationalist	Henry Zwar	9,156	45.6	
Total formal votes		20,080	99.3	
Informal votes		151	0.7	
Turnout		20,231	92.1	
Labor hold		Swing		

=== Kara Kara and Borung ===
1927 Victorian state election: Kara Kara and Borung
Party	Candidate	Votes	%	±%
Nationalist	John Pennington	4,217	45.3	
Country Progressive	Finlay Cameron	2,732	29.3	
Country	William Pearce	2,368	25.4	
Total formal votes		9,317	97.4	
Informal votes		250	2.6	
Turnout		9,567	90.8	
Two-candidate-preferred result
Nationalist	John Pennington	5,068	54.4	
Country Progressive	Finlay Cameron	4,249	45.6	
Nationalist hold		Swing		

=== Kew ===
1927 Victorian state election: Kew
Party	Candidate	Votes	%	±%
Nationalist	Edward Reynolds	6,346	32.3	
Labor	Frederick Riley	4,877	24.8	
Independent	Wilfred Hughes	4,727	24.1	
Australian Liberal	William Clark	3,696	18.8	
Total formal votes		19,646	97.6	
Informal votes		475	2.4	
Turnout		20,121	93.1	
Two-candidate-preferred result
Independent	Wilfred Hughes	10,964	55.8	
Nationalist	Edward Reynolds	8,682	44.2	
Independent gain from Nationalist		Swing		

=== Korong and Eaglehawk ===
1927 Victorian state election: Korong and Eaglehawk
Party	Candidate	Votes	%	±%
Country Progressive	Albert Dunstan	5,566	56.1	
Country	Isaac Weaver	4,365	43.9	
Total formal votes		9,931	99.0	
Informal votes		98	1.0	
Turnout		10,029	93.1	
Country Progressive gain from Country		Swing		

=== Lowan ===
1927 Victorian state election: Lowan
Party	Candidate	Votes	%	±%
Country	Marcus Wettenhall	5,633	57.7	
Country Progressive	George Clyne	4,127	42.2	
Total formal votes		9,760	98.3	
Informal votes		167	1.7	
Turnout		9,927	91.1	
Country hold		Swing		

=== Maryborough and Daylesford ===
1927 Victorian state election: Maryborough and Daylesford
Party	Candidate	Votes	%	±%
Labor	George Frost	5,914	60.7	
Nationalist	Edmund Jowett	3,830	39.3	
Total formal votes		9,744	98.8	
Informal votes		121	1.2	
Turnout		9,865	74.3	
Labor hold		Swing		

=== Melbourne ===
1927 Victorian state election: Melbourne
Party	Candidate	Votes	%	±%
Labor	Tom Hayes	12,115	66.6	
Australian Liberal	Carlyle Ferguson	6,071	33.4	
Total formal votes		18,186	97.4	
Informal votes		489	2.6	
Turnout		18,675	81.0	
Labor hold		Swing		

=== Mildura ===
1927 Victorian state election: Mildura
Party	Candidate	Votes	%	±%
Labor	James McDonald	3,251	40.3	
Country Progressive	Albert Allnutt	2,592	32.1	
Country	James Lochhead	2,229	27.6	
Total formal votes		8,072	98.0	
Informal votes		168	2.0	
Turnout		8,240	90.9	
Two-candidate-preferred result
Country Progressive	Albert Allnutt	4,639	57.5	
Labor	James McDonald	3,433	42.5	
Country Progressive gain from Labor		Swing		

=== Mornington ===
1927 Victorian state election: Mornington
Party	Candidate	Votes	%	±%
Country	Alfred Downward	3,884	42.5	
Nationalist	Alfred Kirton	3,388	37.1	
Australian Liberal	Cyril Croskell	1,866	20.4	
Total formal votes		9,138	97.4	
Informal votes		248	2.6	
Turnout		9,386	89.2	
Two-candidate-preferred result
Country	Alfred Downward	4,898	53.6	
Nationalist	Alfred Kirton	4,240	46.4	
Country hold		Swing		

=== Northcote ===
1927 Victorian state election: Northcote
Party	Candidate	Votes	%	±%
Labor	John Cain	unopposed		
Labor hold		Swing		

=== Nunawading ===
1927 Victorian state election: Nunawading
Party	Candidate	Votes	%	±%
Nationalist	Edmund Greenwood	8,044	46.5	
Labor	John Toohey	5,866	33.9	
Nationalist	Garnet Soilleux	1,674	9.7	
Australian Liberal	Stephen Thompson	1,095	6.3	
Australian Liberal	Robert Halliday	602	3.5	
Total formal votes		17,281	97.7	
Informal votes		410	2.3	
Turnout		17,691	93.1	
Two-party-preferred result
Nationalist	Edmund Greenwood	10,209	59.1	
Labor	John Toohey	7,072	40.9	
Nationalist hold		Swing		

=== Oakleigh ===
1927 Victorian state election: Oakleigh
Party	Candidate	Votes	%	±%
Labor	Squire Reid	9,500	41.8	
Nationalist	Robert Knox	8,421	37.1	
Australian Liberal	Thomas Riley	4,786	21.1	
Total formal votes		22,707	97.9	
Informal votes		483	2.1	
Turnout		23,190	93.8	
Two-party-preferred result
Labor	Squire Reid	11,427	50.3	
Nationalist	Robert Knox	11,280	49.7	
Labor gain from Nationalist		Swing		

=== Ouyen ===
1927 Victorian state election: Ouyen
Party	Candidate	Votes	%	±%
Country Progressive	Harold Glowrey	3,529	39.6	
Country	Henry Pickering	3,350	37.6	
Labor	Francis Williamson	2,032	22.8	
Total formal votes		8,911	97.9	
Informal votes		194	2.1	
Turnout		9,105	86.7	
Two-candidate-preferred result
Country Progressive	Harold Glowrey	4,908	55.1	
Country	Henry Pickering	4,003	44.9	
Country Progressive gain from Country		Swing		

=== Polwarth ===
1927 Victorian state election: Polwarth
Party	Candidate	Votes	%	±%
Nationalist	James McDonald	unopposed		
Nationalist hold		Swing		

=== Port Fairy and Glenelg ===
1927 Victorian state election: Port Fairy and Glenelg
Party	Candidate	Votes	%	±%
Labor	Ernie Bond	6,154	60.6	
Nationalist	William Shaw	3,996	39.4	
Total formal votes		10,150	98.9	
Informal votes		115	1.1	
Turnout		10,265	94.2	
Labor hold		Swing		

=== Port Melbourne ===
1927 Victorian state election: Port Melbourne
Party	Candidate	Votes	%	±%
Labor	James Murphy	unopposed		
Labor hold		Swing		

=== Prahran ===
1927 Victorian state election: Prahran
Party	Candidate	Votes	%	±%
Labor	Arthur Jackson	12,772	56.5	+4.9
Nationalist	Thomas White	9,847	43.5	+11.1
Total formal votes		22,619	98.7	
Informal votes		289	1.3	
Turnout		22,908	91.3	
Labor hold		Swing		

=== Richmond ===
1927 Victorian state election: Richmond
Party	Candidate	Votes	%	±%
Labor	Ted Cotter	unopposed		
Labor hold		Swing		

=== Rodney ===
1927 Victorian state election: Rodney
Party	Candidate	Votes	%	±%
Country	John Allan	5,836	59.6	
Country Progressive	Frederick Churches	3,601	36.8	
Australian Liberal	Percy Bryce	360	3.7	
Total formal votes		9,797	98.0	
Informal votes		204	2.0	
Turnout		10,001	92.1	
Country hold		Swing		

- Preferences were not distributed.

=== St Kilda ===
1927 Victorian state election: St Kilda
Party	Candidate	Votes	%	±%
Australian Liberal	Burnett Gray	11,227	50.4	
Nationalist	Frederic Eggleston	6,456	29.0	
Independent	Florence Johnson	4,597	20.6	
Total formal votes		22,280	97.1	
Informal votes		660	2.9	
Turnout		22,940	91.9	
Australian Liberal gain from Nationalist		Swing		

- Preferences were not distributed.

=== Stawell and Ararat ===
1927 Victorian state election: Stawell and Ararat
Party	Candidate	Votes	%	±%
Nationalist	Richard Toutcher	5,520	55.8	
Labor	Robert McCracken	4,366	44.2	
Total formal votes		9,886	97.9	
Informal votes		209	2.1	
Turnout		10,095	92.8	
Nationalist hold		Swing		

=== Swan Hill ===
1927 Victorian state election: Swan Hill
Party	Candidate	Votes	%	±%
Country	Francis Old	3,245	43.5	
Independent	William Sullivan	2,190	29.4	
Country Progressive	Ernest Gray	2,021	27.1	
Total formal votes		7,456	96.9	
Informal votes		240	3.1	
Turnout		7,696	87.1	
Two-candidate-preferred result
Country	Francis Old	4,510	60.5	
Independent	William Sullivan	2,946	39.5	
Country hold		Swing		

=== Toorak ===
1927 Victorian state election: Toorak
Party	Candidate	Votes	%	±%
Nationalist	Stanley Argyle	9,458	48.5	
Labor	Charles Cope	6,124	31.4	
Australian Liberal	Horace Mason	3,912	20.1	
Total formal votes		19,494	97.7	
Informal votes		458	2.3	
Turnout		19,952	89.9	
Two-party-preferred result
Nationalist	Stanley Argyle	12,084	62.0	
Labor	Charles Cope	7,410	38.0	
Nationalist hold		Swing		

=== Upper Goulburn ===
1927 Victorian state election: Upper Goulburn
Party	Candidate	Votes	%	±%
Labor	Edward Withers	3,658	44.1	
Country	Edwin Mackrell	2,805	33.8	
Nationalist	George Wilson	1,831	22.1	
Total formal votes		8,294	98.6	
Informal votes		120	1.4	
Turnout		8,414	90.2	
Two-party-preferred result
Country	Edwin Mackrell	4,303	51.9	
Labor	Edward Withers	3,991	48.1	
Country hold		Swing		

=== Upper Yarra ===
1927 Victorian state election: Upper Yarra
Party	Candidate	Votes	%	±%
Nationalist	George Knox	4,057	40.2	
Labor	Henry Courtney	3,076	30.5	
Independent	John Mahony	1,402	13.9	
Australian Liberal	George Ingram	554	5.5	
Country	John Dedman	503	5.0	
Independent	Henry Glynn	492	4.9	
Total formal votes		10,084	96.9	
Informal votes		327	3.1	
Turnout		10,411	90.9	
Two-party-preferred result
Nationalist	George Knox	6,320	62.7	
Labor	Henry Courtney	3,764	37.3	
Nationalist hold		Swing		

=== Walhalla ===
1927 Victorian state election: Walhalla
Party	Candidate	Votes	%	±%
Labor	James Bermingham	3,223	38.8	
Country	William Moncur	2,659	32.0	
Nationalist	Samuel Barnes	2,423	29.2	
Total formal votes		8,305	98.0	
Informal votes		172	2.0	
Turnout		8,477	91.2	
Two-party-preferred result
Country	William Moncur	4,381	52.8	
Labor	James Bermingham	3,924	47.2	
Country gain from Nationalist		Swing		

=== Wangaratta and Ovens ===
1927 Victorian state election: Wangaratta and Ovens
Party	Candidate	Votes	%	±%
Country	John Bowser	3,221	38.8	
Australian Liberal	William Higgins	3,116	37.6	
Country	Lot Diffey	1,953	23.6	
Total formal votes		8,290	96.8	
Informal votes		271	3.2	
Turnout		8,561	92.0	
Two-candidate-preferred result
Country	John Bowser	4,409	53.2	
Australian Liberal	William Higgins	3,881	46.8	
Country hold		Swing		

=== Waranga ===
1927 Victorian state election: Waranga
Party	Candidate	Votes	%	±%
Labor	Gerald Honan	3,176	38.0	
Nationalist	Ernest Coyle	2,322	27.7	
Country	John McKee	1,747	20.5	
Nationalist	Henry Thomas	1,122	13.3	
Total formal votes		8,367	98.1	
Informal votes		161	1.9	
Turnout		8,528	91.2	
Two-party-preferred result
Nationalist	Ernest Coyle	4,518	54.0	
Labor	Gerald Honan	3,849	46.0	
Nationalist hold		Swing		

=== Warrenheip and Grenville ===
1927 Victorian state election: Warrenheip and Grenville
Party	Candidate	Votes	%	±%
Labor	Edmond Hogan	5,359	58.3	
Nationalist	Robert McGregor	3,828	41.7	
Total formal votes		9,187	99.2	
Informal votes		78	0.8	
Turnout		9,265	95.1	
Labor hold		Swing		

=== Warrnambool ===
1927 Victorian state election: Warrnambool
Party	Candidate	Votes	%	±%
Labor	Henry Bailey	4,947	53.1	
Nationalist	James Swan	3,904	41.9	
Australian Liberal	William Downing	466	5.0	
Total formal votes		9,317	99.1	
Informal votes		83	0.9	
Turnout		9,400	94.1	
Two-party-preferred result
Labor	Henry Bailey		53.6	
Nationalist	James Swan		46.4	
Labor gain from Nationalist		Swing		

- Two party preferred vote was estimated.

=== Williamstown ===
1927 Victorian state election: Williamstown
Party	Candidate	Votes	%	±%
Labor	John Lemmon	13,626	71.7	
Nationalist	Francis Wilcher	5,375	28.3	
Total formal votes		19,001	99.0	
Informal votes		195	1.0	
Turnout		19,196	94.2	
Labor hold		Swing		

=== Wonthaggi ===
1927 Victorian state election: Wonthaggi
Party	Candidate	Votes	%	±%
Labor	William McKenzie	4,548	52.4	
Country	Herbert Hyland	1,654	18.9	
Country	Peter Hudson	1,123	12.8	
Nationalist	William Walker	876	10.0	
Australian Liberal	William Easton	509	5.8	
Total formal votes		8,746	97.4	
Informal votes		237	2.6	
Turnout		8,983	93.0	
Labor hold		Swing		

- Preferences were not distributed.

== See also ==
- 1927 Victorian state election
- Candidates of the 1927 Victorian state election
- Members of the Victorian Legislative Assembly, 1927–1929
