= Electoral results for the district of Ovens =

Victoria, Australia, district election results

This is a list of electoral results for the electoral district of Ovens in Victorian state elections.

== Members for Ovens ==
One member initially, two from the increase in members of 1859.

Member 1	Term	Member 2	Term
Daniel Cameron (Note: Daniel Cameron was also member for Ovens in the unicameral Victorian Legislative Council December 1855 to March 1856.)	Nov. 1856 – Mar. 1857		
John Wood	Apr. 1857 (Note: by-election) – July 1861		
John Wood	Apr. 1857 – July 1861	Alexander Keefer	Oct. 1859 – Mar. 1860
John Wood	Apr. 1857 – July 1861	John Donald	Mar. 1860 – July 1861
William Charles Weekes	Aug. 1861 – Aug. 1864	Peter Wright	Aug. 1861 – Aug. 1864
George Verney Smith	Nov. 1864 – Apr. 1877	George Kerferd	Nov. 1864 – Jan. 1886
George Billson	May 1877 – June 1880	George Kerferd	Nov. 1864 – Jan. 1886
William Zincke	July 1880 – Feb. 1883	George Kerferd	Nov. 1864 – Jan. 1886
George Billson	Feb. 1883 – Feb. 1886	George Kerferd	Nov. 1864 – Jan. 1886
Joseph Ferguson	Mar. 1886 – Mar. 1889	Ferguson Tuthill	Jan. 1886 – Mar. 1889

Single Member District 1889–1927
Member	Party	Term
Joseph Ferguson	Unaligned	1889–1894
J. A. Isaacs	Unaligned	1894–1902
Thomas Ashworth	Unaligned	1902–1904
Alfred Billson	Unaligned	1904–1916
Alfred Billson	Nationalist	1916–1924
Alfred Billson	Liberal	1924–1927

== Election results ==
=== Elections in the 1920s ===
1924 Victorian state election: Ovens
Party	Candidate	Votes	%	±%
Australian Liberal	Alfred Billson	1,986	56.4	+56.4
Labor	John Price	1,533	43.6	+43.6
Total formal votes		3,519	98.8	
Informal votes		43	1.2	
Turnout		3,562	73.0	
Australian Liberal gain from Nationalist		Swing	N/A	

- Alfred Billson was the sitting Nationalist MP for Ovens.

1921 Victorian state election: Ovens
Party	Candidate	Votes	%	±%
Nationalist	Alfred Billson	unopposed		
Nationalist hold		Swing		

1920 Victorian state election: Ovens
Party	Candidate	Votes	%	±%
Nationalist	Alfred Billson	unopposed		
Nationalist hold		Swing		

1917 Victorian state election: Ovens
Party	Candidate	Votes	%	±%
Nationalist	Alfred Billson	1,580	46.7	−5.7
Labor	William Gribble	1,026	30.3	−17.3
Nationalist	Erle Evans	776	22.9	+22.9
Total formal votes		3,382	95.9	−2.0
Informal votes		146	4.1	+2.0
Turnout		3,528	58.9	−7.3
Two-party-preferred result
Nationalist	Alfred Billson	2,022	59.8	+7.4
Labor	William Gribble	1,360	40.2	−7.4
Nationalist hold		Swing	+7.4	

1914 Victorian state election: Ovens
Party	Candidate	Votes	%	±%
Liberal	Alfred Billson	2,293	52.4	−8.3
Labor	Christopher Bennett	2,083	47.6	+8.3
Total formal votes		4,376	97.9	+2.2
Informal votes		93	2.1	−2.2
Turnout		4,469	66.2	+1.9
Liberal hold		Swing	−8.3	

1911 Victorian state election: Ovens
Party	Candidate	Votes	%	±%
Liberal	Alfred Billson	2,599	60.7	−0.9
Labor	Christopher Bennett	1,680	39.3	+0.9
Total formal votes		4,279	95.7	−3.6
Informal votes		191	4.3	+3.6
Turnout		4,470	64.3	+5.7
Liberal hold		Swing	−0.9	
