= Electoral results for the district of Waranga =

Australian district election results

This is a list of electoral results for the electoral district of Waranga in Victorian state elections.

== Members for Waranga ==
Member	Party	Term
John Morrissey	Unaligned	1904–1907
John Walter Mason	Unaligned	1907–1908
Martin Cussen	Liberal	1908–1911
John Gordon	Liberal	1911–1917
John Gordon	Nationalist	1917–1927
Ernest Coyle	Nationalist	1927–1931
Ernest Coyle	UAP	1931–1933
Ernest Coyle	Country	1933–1943
Wollaston Heily	Country	1943–1945

== Election results ==
=== Elections in the 1940s ===
1943 Waranga state by-election
Party	Candidate	Votes	%	±%
Country	Wollaston Heily	4,144	57.9	−12.1
Independent	Edward Hill	3,011	42.1	+42.1
Total formal votes		7,155	99.3	+0.3
Informal votes		47	0.7	−0.3
Turnout		7,202	83.4	−3.7
Country hold		Swing	N/A	

1943 Victorian state election: Waranga
Party	Candidate	Votes	%	±%
Country	Ernest Coyle	5,185	70.0	−30.0
Independent	Patrick Finnigan	2,227	30.0	+30.0
Total formal votes		7,412	99.0	
Informal votes		78	1.0	
Turnout		7,490	87.1	
Country hold		Swing	N/A	

1940 Victorian state election: Waranga
Party	Candidate	Votes	%	±%
Country	Ernest Coyle	unopposed		
Country hold		Swing		

=== Elections in the 1930s ===
1937 Victorian state election: Waranga
Party	Candidate	Votes	%	±%
Country	Ernest Coyle	unopposed		
Country hold		Swing		

1935 Victorian state election: Waranga
Party	Candidate	Votes	%	±%
Country	Ernest Coyle	5,824	64.4	+21.2
Independent	William Cochrane	1,854	20.5	+20.5
United Australia	David Thomas	1,370	15.1	−41.7
Total formal votes		9,048	98.9	+0.1
Informal votes		100	1.1	−0.1
Turnout		9,148	95.5	+1.1
Country gain from United Australia		Swing	N/A	

- Coyle was elected as a UAP member for Waranga in the 1932 election, but joined the Country party in 1933.

1932 Victorian state election: Waranga
Party	Candidate	Votes	%	±%
United Australia	Ernest Coyle	4,987	56.8	+8.2
Country	John McEwen	3,799	43.2	+24.6
Total formal votes		8,588	98.8	0.0
Informal votes		102	1.2	0.0
Turnout		8,890	94.4	+0.2
United Australia hold		Swing	N/A	

=== Elections in the 1920s ===
1929 Victorian state election: Waranga
Party	Candidate	Votes	%	±%
Nationalist	Ernest Coyle	4,176	48.6	+7.6
Labor	John Minogue	2,809	32.7	−5.3
Country	William Pook	929	10.8	−9.7
Country	Edward Buckland	674	7.8	+7.8
Total formal votes		8,588	98.8	+0.7
Informal votes		102	1.2	−0.7
Turnout		8,690	94.2	+3.0
Nationalist hold		Swing	N/A	

- Preferences were not distributed.

1927 Victorian state election: Waranga
Party	Candidate	Votes	%	±%
Labor	Gerald Honan	3,176	38.0	
Nationalist	Ernest Coyle	2,322	27.7	
Country	John McKee	1,747	20.5	
Nationalist	Henry Thomas	1,122	13.3	
Total formal votes		8,367	98.1	
Informal votes		161	1.9	
Turnout		8,528	91.2	
Two-party-preferred result
Nationalist	Ernest Coyle	4,518	54.0	
Labor	Gerald Honan	3,849	46.0	
Nationalist hold		Swing		

1924 Victorian state election: Waranga
Party	Candidate	Votes	%	±%
Nationalist	John Gordon	unopposed		
Nationalist hold		Swing		

1921 Victorian state election: Waranga
Party	Candidate	Votes	%	±%
Nationalist	John Gordon	unopposed		
Nationalist hold		Swing		

1920 Victorian state election: Waranga
Party	Candidate	Votes	%	±%
Nationalist	John Gordon	3,102	66.6	+0.9
Labor	Thomas McKendrick	1,554	33.4	−0.9
Total formal votes		4,656	93.5	−2.4
Informal votes		324	6.5	+2.4
Turnout		4,980	70.5	+7.4
Nationalist hold		Swing	+0.9	

=== Elections in the 1910s ===
1917 Victorian state election: Waranga
Party	Candidate	Votes	%	±%
Nationalist	John Gordon	2,811	65.7	−8.0
Labor	Leon Villiers	1,465	34.3	+8.0
Total formal votes		4,276	95.9	−2.1
Informal votes		183	4.1	+2.1
Turnout		4,459	63.1	−4.5
Nationalist hold		Swing	−8.0	

1914 Victorian state election: Waranga
Party	Candidate	Votes	%	±%
Liberal	John Gordon	3,442	73.7	+23.6
Labor	Daniel Nagle	1,229	26.3	+26.3
Total formal votes		4,671	98.0	−1.0
Informal votes		98	2.0	+1.0
Turnout		4,769	67.6	−12.3
Liberal hold		Swing	N/A	

1911 Victorian state election: Waranga
Party	Candidate	Votes	%	±%
Liberal	John Gordon	2,845	50.1	+24.4
Independent	Henry Thomas	2,829	49.9	+29.9
Total formal votes		5,674	99.0	−0.2
Informal votes		57	1.0	+0.2
Turnout		5,731	79.9	+7.8
Liberal hold		Swing	N/A	
