= Electoral results for the district of Upper Goulburn =

Election results in Victoria, Australia

This is a list of electoral results for the electoral district of Upper Goulburn in Victorian state elections.

== Members for Upper Goulburn ==
Member	Party	Term
Thomas Hunt	Unaligned	1904–1908
George Cookson	Liberal	1908–1911
Malcolm McKenzie	Liberal	1911–1917
Malcolm McKenzie	Nationalist	1917–1920
Edwin Mackrell	Country	1920–1945

== Election results ==
=== Elections in the 1940s ===
1943 Victorian state election: Upper Goulburn
Party	Candidate	Votes	%	±%
Country	Edwin Mackrell	unopposed		
Country hold		Swing		

1940 Victorian state election: Upper Goulburn
Party	Candidate	Votes	%	±%
Country	Edwin Mackrell	unopposed		
Country hold		Swing		

=== Elections in the 1930s ===
1937 Victorian state election: Upper Goulburn
Party	Candidate	Votes	%	±%
Country	Edwin Mackrell	unopposed		
Country hold		Swing		

1935 Victorian state election: Upper Goulburn
Party	Candidate	Votes	%	±%
Country	Edwin Mackrell	5,620	61.8	+15.9
Labor	Edward Withers	3,476	38.2	+5.5
Total formal votes		9,096	99.2	+0.4
Informal votes		75	0.8	−0.4
Turnout		9,171	94.4	+0.5
Country hold		Swing	−3.0	

1932 Victorian state election: Upper Goulburn
Party	Candidate	Votes	%	±%
Country	Edwin Mackrell	4,029	45.9	−5.3
Labor	John Dedman	2,867	32.7	−16.1
United Australia	Robert Forsyth	1,879	21.4	+21.4
Total formal votes		8,775	98.8	−0.6
Informal votes		109	1.2	+0.6
Turnout		8,884	93.9	−0.4
Two-party-preferred result
Country	Edwin Mackrell	5,682	64.8	+13.6
Labor	John Dedman	3,093	35.2	−13.6
Country hold		Swing	+13.6	

=== Elections in the 1920s ===
1929 Victorian state election: Upper Goulburn
Party	Candidate	Votes	%	±%
Country	Edwin Mackrell	4,555	51.2	+17.4
Labor	Edward Withers	4,337	48.8	+4.7
Total formal votes		8,892	99.4	+0.8
Informal votes		57	0.6	−0.8
Turnout		8,949	94.3	+4.1
Country hold		Swing	−0.7	

1927 Victorian state election: Upper Goulburn
Party	Candidate	Votes	%	±%
Labor	Edward Withers	3,658	44.1	
Country	Edwin Mackrell	2,805	33.8	
Nationalist	George Wilson	1,831	22.1	
Total formal votes		8,294	98.6	
Informal votes		120	1.4	
Turnout		8,414	90.2	
Two-party-preferred result
Country	Edwin Mackrell	4,303	51.9	
Labor	Edward Withers	3,991	48.1	
Country hold		Swing		

1924 Victorian state election: Upper Goulburn
Party	Candidate	Votes	%	±%
Labor	John Minogue	2,137	38.3	+4.4
Country	Edwin Mackrell	1,889	33.8	0.0
Nationalist	Robert McAlpin	1,556	27.9	−4.4
Total formal votes		5,582	98.7	+0.5
Informal votes		73	1.3	−0.5
Turnout		5,655	72.9	+7.8
Two-party-preferred result
Country	Edwin Mackrell	3,257	58.3	−3.4
Labor	John Minogue	2,325	41.7	+3.4
Country hold		Swing	−3.4	

1921 Victorian state election: Upper Goulburn
Party	Candidate	Votes	%	±%
Labor	Christopher Gleeson	1,757	33.9	−1.6
Victorian Farmers	Edwin Mackrell	1,750	33.8	−0.2
Nationalist	John Leckie	1,678	32.4	+1.9
Total formal votes		5,185	98.2	+3.3
Informal votes		97	1.8	−3.3
Turnout		5,282	65.1	+1.7
Two-party-preferred result
Victorian Farmers	Edwin Mackrell	3,198	61.7	+3.6
Labor	Christopher Gleeson	1,987	38.3	−3.6
Victorian Farmers hold		Swing	+3.6	

1921 Upper Goulburn state by-election
Party	Candidate	Votes	%	±%
Labor	Christopher Gleeson	1,960	38.3	+2.8
Victorian Farmers	Edwin Mackrell	1,885	36.9	+2.9
Nationalist	William Whiting	1,266	24.8	−5.7
Total formal votes		5,111	N/A	N/A
Informal votes		N/A	N/A	
Turnout		N/A	N/A	N/A
Two-party-preferred result
Victorian Farmers	Edwin Mackrell	2,925	57.2	−0.9
Labor	Christopher Gleeson	2,186	42.8	+0.9
Victorian Farmers hold		Swing	−0.9	

1920 Victorian state election: Upper Goulburn
Party	Candidate	Votes	%	±%
Labor	Christopher Gleeson	1,746	35.5	+35.5
Victorian Farmers	Edwin Mackrell	1,669	34.0	+34.0
Nationalist	William Whiting	1,499	30.5	
Total formal votes		4,914	94.9	−3.1
Informal votes		267	5.1	+3.1
Turnout		5,181	63.4	+10.0
Two-party-preferred result
Victorian Farmers	Edwin Mackrell	2,857	58.1	+58.1
Labor	Christopher Gleeson	2,057	41.9	+41.9
Victorian Farmers gain from Nationalist		Swing	N/A	

=== Elections in the 1910s ===
1917 Victorian state election: Upper Goulburn
Party	Candidate	Votes	%	±%
Nationalist	Malcolm McKenzie	2,630	61.0	+1.0
Nationalist	Thomas Hunt	1,678	39.0	+39.0
Total formal votes		4,308	98.0	+1.3
Informal votes		87	2.0	−1.3
Turnout		4,395	53.4	−4.1
Nationalist hold		Swing	N/A	

1914 Victorian state election: Upper Goulburn
Party	Candidate	Votes	%	±%
Liberal	Malcolm McKenzie	2,746	60.0	+39.4
Labor	Michael O'Brien	1,833	40.0	+14.7
Total formal votes		4,579	96.7	−1.4
Informal votes		155	3.3	+1.4
Turnout		4,734	57.5	−9.0
Liberal hold		Swing	N/A	

1911 Victorian state election: Upper Goulburn
Party	Candidate	Votes	%	±%
Independent	Malcolm McKenzie	1,758	34.6	+34.6
Labor	Ernest Moloney	1,285	25.3	+25.3
Liberal	George Cookson	1,049	20.6	−31.4
Independent	Thomas Hunt	990	19.5	−28.5
Total formal votes		5,082	98.1	−1.5
Informal votes		97	1.9	+1.5
Turnout		5,179	66.5	+9.0
Two-candidate-preferred result
Independent	Malcolm McKenzie	2,885	56.8	+56.8
Labor	Ernest Moloney	2,197	43.2	+43.2
Independent gain from Liberal		Swing	N/A	
