= Electoral results for the district of Heidelberg =

Victoria, Australia, district election results

This is a list of electoral results for the electoral district of Heidelberg in Victorian state elections.

== Members for Heidelberg ==
Member	Party	Term
Gordon Webber	Labor	1927–1932
Henry Zwar	United Australia	1932–1944
Henry Zwar	Liberal	1944–1945
Henry Zwar	Independent Liberal	1945

== Election results ==
=== Elections in the 1940s ===
1943 Victorian state election: Heidelberg
Party	Candidate	Votes	%	±%
United Australia	Henry Zwar	20,185	61.1	−2.5
Labor	Leonard Hartnett	12,852	38.9	+2.5
Total formal votes		33,037	98.8	−0.2
Informal votes		405	1.2	+0.2
Turnout		33,442	89.5	−5.8
United Australia hold		Swing	−2.5	

1940 Victorian state election: Heidelberg
Party	Candidate	Votes	%	±%
United Australia	Henry Zwar	19,226	63.6	+11.3
Labor	James O'Meara	11,024	36.4	−11.3
Total formal votes		30,250	99.0	−0.3
Informal votes		312	1.0	+0.3
Turnout		30,562	95.3	+0.2
United Australia hold		Swing	+11.3	

=== Elections in the 1930s ===
1937 Victorian state election: Heidelberg
Party	Candidate	Votes	%	±%
United Australia	Henry Zwar	14,666	52.3	−2.5
Labor	Morton Dunlop	13,387	47.7	+2.5
Total formal votes		28,053	99.3	+0.5
Informal votes		209	0.7	−0.5
Turnout		28,262	95.1	−1.2
United Australia hold		Swing	−2.5	

1935 Victorian state election: Heidelberg
Party	Candidate	Votes	%	±%
United Australia	Henry Zwar	14,577	54.8	+9.8
Labor	Gordon Webber	12,021	45.2	+3.8
Total formal votes		26,598	98.8	+0.6
Informal votes		318	1.2	−0.6
Turnout		26,916	96.3	+2.7
United Australia hold		Swing	−0.2	

1932 Victorian state election: Heidelberg
Party	Candidate	Votes	%	±%
United Australia	Henry Zwar	11,192	45.0	+10.7
Labor	Gordon Webber	10,306	41.4	−24.3
Ind. United Australia	William Hemburrow	3,363	13.5	+13.5
Total formal votes		24,861	98.2	−0.7
Informal votes		463	1.8	+0.7
Turnout		25,324	93.6	+0.8
Two-party-preferred result
United Australia	Henry Zwar	13,676	55.0	+20.7
Labor	Gordon Webber	11,195	45.0	−20.7
United Australia gain from Labor		Swing	+20.7	

=== Elections in the 1920s ===
1929 Victorian state election: Heidelberg
Party	Candidate	Votes	%	±%
Labor	Gordon Webber	15,391	65.7	+11.3
Nationalist	William Luke	8,031	34.3	−11.3
Total formal votes		23,422	98.9	−0.4
Informal votes		269	1.1	+0.4
Turnout		23,691	92.8	+0.7
Labor hold		Swing	+11.3	

1927 Victorian state election: Heidelberg
Party	Candidate	Votes	%	±%
Labor	Gordon Webber	10,924	54.4	
Nationalist	Henry Zwar	9,156	45.6	
Total formal votes		20,080	99.3	
Informal votes		151	0.7	
Turnout		20,231	92.1	
Labor hold		Swing		
