= Electoral results for the district of Walhalla =

Australian district election results

This is a list of electoral results for the electoral district of Walhalla in Victorian state elections.

== Members for Walhalla ==
Member	Party	Term
Albert Harris	Unaligned	1904–1910
Samuel Barnes	Comm. Liberal \ Nationalist	1910–1927
William Moncur	Country	1927–1945

== Election results ==
=== Elections in the 1940s ===
1943 Victorian state election: Walhalla
Party	Candidate	Votes	%	±%
Labor	Leslie Kaeppel	4,750	42.0	+42.0
Country	William Moncur	3,235	28.6	−71.4
Country	William Simpson	2,077	18.4	+18.4
Country	David White	824	7.3	+7.3
Independent	Jack Whiteacre	421	3.7	+3.7
Total formal votes		11,307	96.4	
Informal votes		425	3.6	
Turnout		11,732	87.9	
Two-party-preferred result
Country	William Moncur	5,844	51.7	−48.3
Labor	Leslie Kaeppel	5,463	48.3	+48.3
Country hold		Swing	N/A	

1940 Victorian state election: Walhalla
Party	Candidate	Votes	%	±%
Country	William Moncur	unopposed		
Country hold		Swing		

=== Elections in the 1930s ===
1937 Victorian state election: Walhalla
Party	Candidate	Votes	%	±%
Country	William Moncur	4,937	46.9	−12.1
Independent Labor	Arthur Fewster	3,029	28.8	+28.8
Independent Country	Daniel White	1,437	13.7	−27.3
United Australia	Claude Lewis	1,120	10.6	+10.6
Total formal votes		10,523	97.9	−0.1
Informal votes		227	2.1	+0.1
Turnout		10,750	93.8	−1.3
After distribution of preferences
Country	William Moncur	5,435	51.6	
Independent Labor	Arthur Fewster	3,164	30.1	
Independent Country	Daniel White	1,924	18.3	
Country hold		Swing	N/A	

- Preferences were not distributed to completion.

1935 Victorian state election: Walhalla
Party	Candidate	Votes	%	±%
Country	William Moncur	5,925	59.0	−0.1
Independent	Daniel White	4,113	41.0	+25.1
Total formal votes		10,038	98.0	−1.0
Informal votes		208	2.0	+1.0
Turnout		10,246	95.1	+2.7
Country hold		Swing	N/A	

1932 Victorian state election: Walhalla
Party	Candidate	Votes	%	±%
Country	William Moncur	5,708	59.1	+14.4
Labor	Harold McGowan	2,808	29.1	−16.1
Independent	Daniel White	1,44	11.8	+11.8
Total formal votes		9,417	99.0	0.0
Informal votes		98	1.0	0.0
Turnout		9,829	92.4	−0.8
Two-party-preferred result
Country	William Moncur		69.7	+16.3
Labor	Harold McGowan		30.3	−16.3
Country hold		Swing	+16.3	

- Two party preferred vote was estimated.

=== Elections in the 1920s ===
1929 Victorian state election: Walhalla
Party	Candidate	Votes	%	±%
Labor	William McGrath	4,259	45.2	+6.4
Country	William Moncur	4,208	44.7	+12.7
Independent Country	Andrew Wilson	950	10.1	+10.1
Total formal votes		9,417	99.0	+1.0
Informal votes		98	1.0	−1.0
Turnout		9,515	93.2	+2.0
Two-party-preferred result
Country	William Moncur	5,024	53.4	+0.6
Labor	William McGrath	4,393	46.6	−0.6
Country hold		Swing	+0.6	

1927 Victorian state election: Walhalla
Party	Candidate	Votes	%	±%
Labor	James Bermingham	3,223	38.8	
Country	William Moncur	2,659	32.0	
Nationalist	Samuel Barnes	2,423	29.2	
Total formal votes		8,305	98.0	
Informal votes		172	2.0	
Turnout		8,477	91.2	
Two-party-preferred result
Country	William Moncur	4,381	52.8	
Labor	James Bermingham	3,924	47.2	
Country gain from Nationalist		Swing		

1924 Victorian state election: Walhalla
Party	Candidate	Votes	%	±%
Nationalist	Samuel Barnes	2,219	53.4	−46.6
Labor	James Bermingham	1,936	46.6	+46.6
Total formal votes		4,155	99.5	
Informal votes		22	0.5	
Turnout		4,177	53.6	
Nationalist hold		Swing	N/A	

1921 Victorian state election: Walhalla
Party	Candidate	Votes	%	±%
Nationalist	Samuel Barnes	unopposed		
Nationalist hold		Swing		

1920 Victorian state election: Walhalla
Party	Candidate	Votes	%	±%
Nationalist	Samuel Barnes	2,212	66.2	−1.3
Labor	Richard Bowers	1,129	33.8	+1.3
Total formal votes		3,341	95.8	−1.8
Informal votes		148	4.2	+1.8
Turnout		3,489	54.4	+11.9
Nationalist hold		Swing	−1.3	

=== Elections in the 1910s ===
1917 Victorian state election: Walhalla
Party	Candidate	Votes	%	±%
Nationalist	Samuel Barnes	1,776	67.5	+3.6
Labor	Edward Nichols	856	32.5	−3.6
Total formal votes		2,632	97.6	−0.4
Informal votes		65	2.4	+0.4
Turnout		2,697	42.5	−1.0
Nationalist hold		Swing	+3.6	

1914 Victorian state election: Walhalla
Party	Candidate	Votes	%	±%
Liberal	Samuel Barnes	1,811	63.9	+1.7
Labor	Edward Nichols	1,021	36.1	−1.7
Total formal votes		2,832	98.0	−0.6
Informal votes		58	2.0	+0.6
Turnout		2,890	43.5	−12.1
Liberal hold		Swing	+1.7	

1911 Victorian state election: Walhalla
Party	Candidate	Votes	%	±%
Liberal	Samuel Barnes	2,032	62.2	N/A
Labor	Samuel Reynolds	1,232	37.7	+37.7
Total formal votes		3,264	98.6	
Informal votes		45	1.4	
Turnout		3,309	55.6	
Liberal hold		Swing	N/A	
