= Electoral results for the district of Abbotsford =

Australian district election results

This is a list of electoral results for the electoral district of Abbotsford in Victorian state elections.

== Members for Abbotsford ==
Member	Party	Term
William Beazley	Labour	1904 – 1912
Gordon Webber	Labor	1912 – 1927

== Election results ==
=== Elections in the 1920s ===
1924 Victorian state election: Abbotsford
Party	Candidate	Votes	%	±%
Labor	Gordon Webber	unopposed		
Labor hold		Swing		

1921 Victorian state election: Abbotsford
Party	Candidate	Votes	%	±%
Labor	Gordon Webber	unopposed		
Labor hold		Swing		

1920 Victorian state election: Abbotsford
Party	Candidate	Votes	%	±%
Labor	Gordon Webber	unopposed		
Labor hold		Swing		

=== Elections in the 1910s ===
1917 Victorian state election: Abbotsford
Party	Candidate	Votes	%	±%
Labor	Gordon Webber	unopposed		
Labor hold		Swing		

1914 Victorian state election: Abbotsford
Party	Candidate	Votes	%	±%
Labor	Gordon Webber	unopposed		
Labor hold		Swing		

1911 Victorian state election: Abbotsford
Party	Candidate	Votes	%	±%
Labor	William Beazley	5,450	73.6	N/A
Liberal	George Martin	1,953	26.4	+26.4
Total formal votes		7,403	99.3	
Informal votes		55	0.7	
Turnout		7,458	59.3	
Labor hold		Swing	N/A	
