= Electoral district of Ovens (Victorian Legislative Council) =

Former electoral district of the Victorian Legislative Council

Coordinates: 36°35′S 146°55′E

Ovens Victoria—Legislative Council
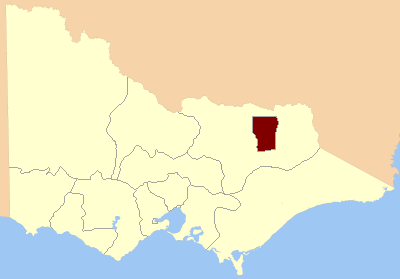
- Location in Victoria
- State: Victoria
- Created: 1855
- Abolished: 1856
- Namesake: The Ovens
- Demographic: Rural

The Electoral district of Ovens (also known as The Ovens) was an electoral district of the old unicameral Victorian Legislative Council of 1851 to 1856. Victoria being a colony in Australia at the time. Ovens was added to the Council in 1855, along with four other districts.

The electoral district of Ovens's area was bound by Whorouly Creek, Ovens River and the Great Dividing Range. It included the town of Beechworth, Victoria.

Ovens was abolished along with all the other districts in the Legislative Council in 1856 as part of the new Parliament of Victoria. New Provinces were created that made up the Legislative Council, which was the upper house from 1856.

== Member ==
Member	Term
Daniel Cameron	November 1855 – March 1856

Cameron went on to represent the Electoral district of Ovens in the new Victorian Legislative Assembly from November 1856.
