= Electoral district of Abbotsford =

Former state electoral district of Victoria

Abbotsford Victoria—Legislative Assembly
- State: Victoria
- Created: 1904
- Abolished: 1927
- Namesake: Abbotsford, Victoria
- Demographic: Metropolitan
- Coordinates: 37°48′35″S 145°0′0″E

Electoral district of Abbotsford was an electoral district of the Legislative Assembly in the Australian state of Victoria.

Abbotsford was created by the post-Federation Electoral Districts Boundaries Act 1903 coming into effect in 1904 when 42 districts were abolished (including Jolimont and West Richmond) and 24 new ones created resulting in 65 districts.

The district of Abbotsford was defined as:

Commencing at the intersection of Hoddle-street and Bridge-road; thence north by Hoddle-street to Reilly-street;^{[a]} thence east by that street to the Merri Creek; thence southerly by that creek and the Yarra River to Campbell's-parade;^{[b]} thence west by Campbell's-parade to Gleadell-street; thence north by that street to Highett-street; thence west by that street to Church-street; thence south by Church-street to Bridge-road; and thence west by Bridge-road to the commencing point.

^{[a]} now Alexandra Parade
^{[b]} now Bridge Road

== Members ==
Member	Party	Term
William Beazley	Labour	1904 – 1912
Gordon Webber	Labor	1912 – 1927

Beazley had previously represented Collingwood from April 1889 to May 1904
Webber went on to represent Heidelberg from April 1927 to April 1932
