= Billson's Brewery =

Brewery in Beechworth, Victoria, Australia

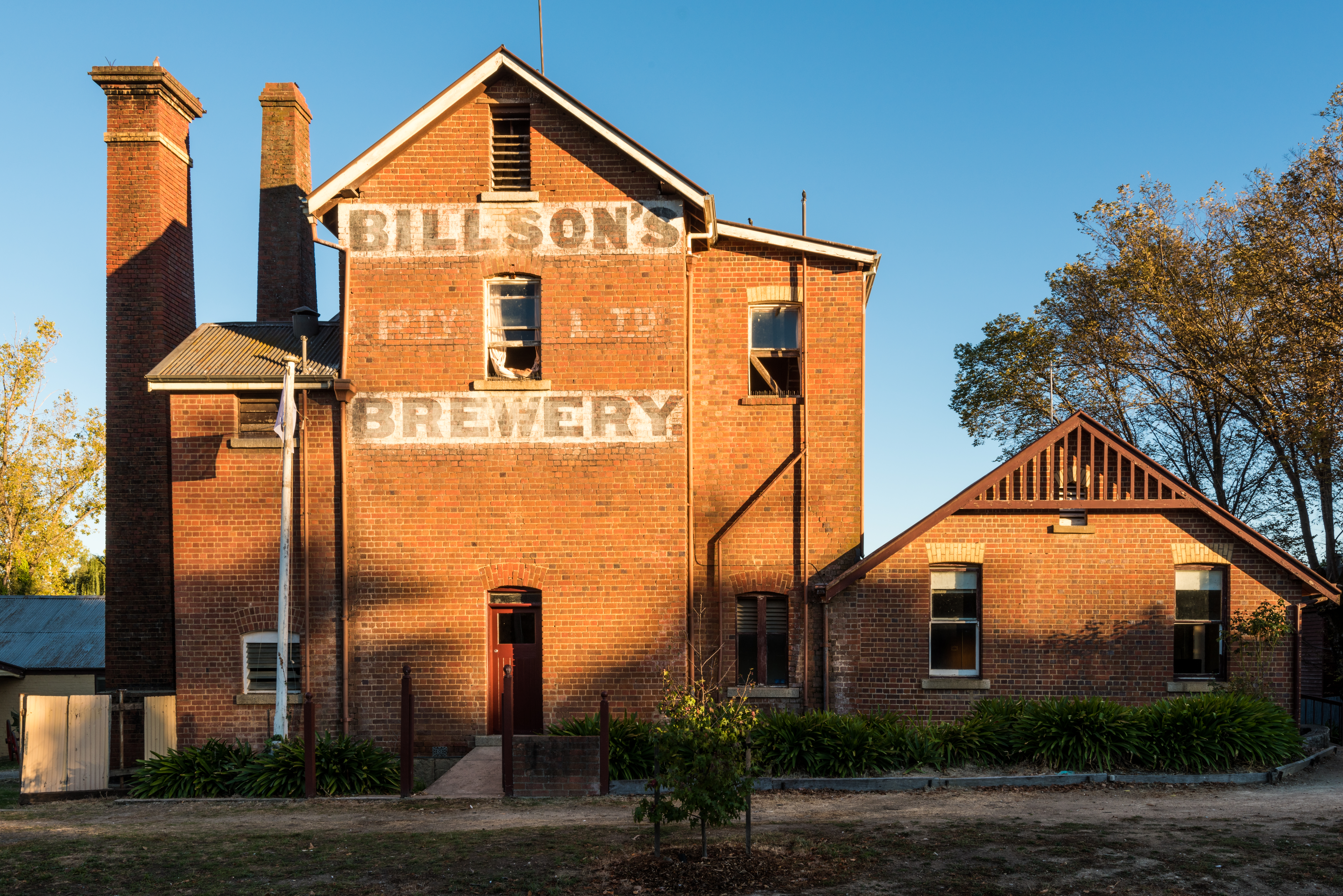
Billson's Brewery, Beechworth, built in 1872–73. (Scott Hartvigsen Photography, 2018.) (later repainted as "Last St Brewery" in 2025)

Last St Brewery (formerly Billson's Brewery) is a brewery established in 1865 in Beechworth, north-east Victoria, and is one of the oldest continuing beverage manufacturers in Australia. It operates from a complex of heritage buildings centred around a Victorian-era 'tower brewery', constructed in 1872–1873. Historically, Billson's Brewery made ale and porter, a range of cordials, aerated mineral waters, soft-drinks and health tonics. Throughout most of the twentieth century, it went under the name of Murray Breweries.

In late July 2024, the owners announced the brewery was going into voluntary administration. In December 2024, the owners announced that the Billson's Brewery brand of ready-to-drink beverages would be acquired by The Coca-Cola Company, whilst the owners would keep running the cordials, soda and beer operations.

After having sold its brand name, the remaining facility changed its name to Last Street in February 2025, and changed the brand name of its cordials and sodas to Isabella's and introduced a new brand name Beth & Bella's for jam (its first food item).

== History ==
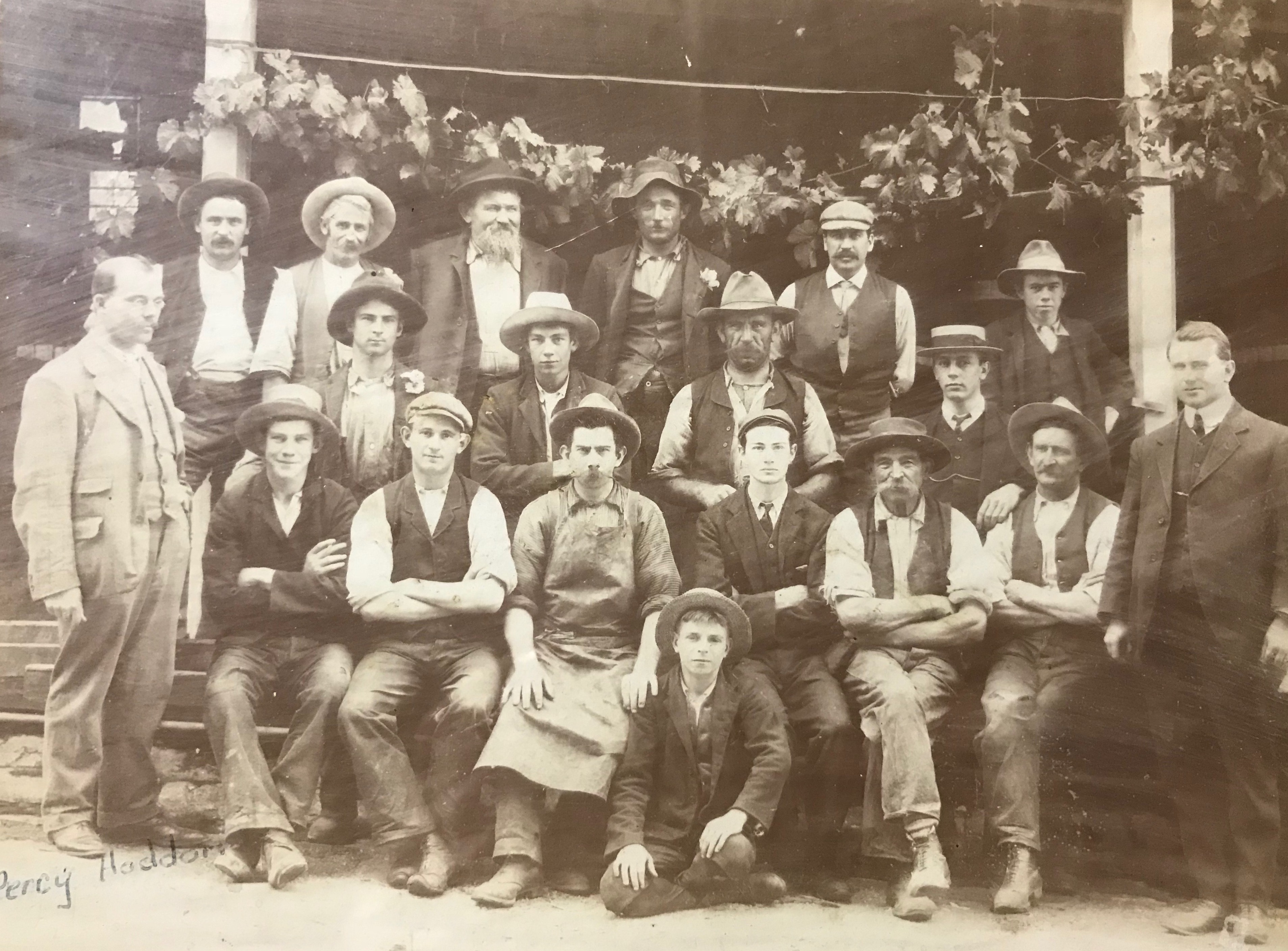
Staff at Billson's Brewery, c.1907. Owner Alfred 'Bosher' Billson, far right; Percy Haddon, far left.

Held to have been established in 1865, Billson's Brewery began commercial operations when 50 year old Englishman George Billson took on the Ovens Brewery and malthouse, Beechworth, which became known as Billson's Ovens Brewery in 1867. The Brewery also produced cordials.

In January 1872, Billson took on his eldest son George Henry Billson as a business partner, and together, G. Billson and Son expanded operations. Selecting a site at 29 Last Street on land which is rich in spring water of exceptional purity, the Billsons opted to build a ‘tower brewery,’ a design which had only recently been adopted in Britain. Billson's brewery, along with a cordial factory, cooperage, and stables for the brewery's horse teams, were all built in 1872-73. After government analysis proved its water quality, an ‘aerated waters manufacture’ was added in 1874. A wine and spirit department was added in 1880.

By 1879, George Henry Billson had left the partnership to pursue his own brewery and malting venture in Albury, New South Wales. Meanwhile, George Billson senior retired, appointing his socially and politically-oriented 23-year-old son, Alfred A. Billson, as his successor in 1881.

After the death of his father in 1886, Alfred Billson changed the name of the business to A. A. Billson's, once again expanding the business. Brewing operations, producing both bottled and draught beers, were headed by Billson's nephew George Collier; while new products were introduced to Billson's line of cordials and aerated waters, managed by Bert Petersen. A cordial factory and depot were opened at Tallangatta in 1885.

In 1888, Billson's began producing its popular Anglo-Australian Ale. A ‘pure malt ale’ styled after a light English ale, it was a traditional beer which did not use any sugar in its fermentation. Accordingly, it required a comparatively long and cool maturation in-bottle, and was brewed in winter.

Facing increasing pressure from the temperance movement in the 1890s, Billson's responded favourably with a low-strength ‘mild family table ale,’ as well as a range of non-alcoholic sparkling beverages catering to adults. These included Social Ginger Cup; Claretta (a beverage intended to replace claret and soda); the health tonic Malto-Quinia Wine; and a distinctive ‘herbal beer’ named Ecks.

Billson's also took advantage of the high quality of its water to produce aerated mineral waters, including soda water, potass water, and lithia water laced with lithium salts. In the early twentieth century, Billson's sold its lithia water as a ‘the most healthful mineral water produced in Australia.’ Lithium was later demonstrated to have clinical efficacy in treating mood disorders in trials run by Dr John Cade, a former superintendent of Beechworth's May Day Hills Asylum.

Billson's traded as A. A. Billson's Anglo-Australian Brewery Company from 1892. By 1895, its cellars were capable of holding 7000 dozen bottles; and at its manufacturing peak in the early 20th century, the brewery could treat 20 hogsheads of liquor (about 5000 litres) per day.

In 1902, when Alfred Billson was increasingly busy pursuing a burgeoning political career in the Legislative Assembly, he handed the daily running of the brewery to new management, while still serving as chairman of the board.

Employer-employee relations remained tight-knit and stable. End of year employee ‘socials’ were held at Billson's private residence adjacent to the Brewery, and in 1906 after a particularly strained period leading up to Christmas, Billson praised his staff to the effect that ‘Throughout the whole establishment a fine spirit of harmony prevailed, and he hoped this would always continue.’

In 1911 the company amalgamated with George Henry Billson's Albury Brewing and Malting Company, to become the Border United Co-operative Breweries Ltd. Towards the end of 1914, this company was liquidated and its operations transferred to the newly registered Murray Breweries Pty. Ltd. Board directors included preeminent Beechworth businessman Albert Michael Zwar of the Beechworth Tannery. At the same time, Zwar also created the Melbourne-based soft-drinking company, Ecks Pty. Ltd.

Murray Breweries immediately began downsizing, closing the Tallangatta factory at the end of 1914, and selling the Albury brewery (which no longer brewed due to poor water quality) in 1920.

The first half the twentieth century saw a decline in the production of alcoholic beverages. The Beer Excise tax (1901), and the increasing local popularity of ‘bitter’ beers from Melbourne breweries, may have contributed to Murray Breweries’ curtailing of its beer production. However, the company continued to produce its Extra Matured Stout into the mid-20th century. It continued to produce its non-alcoholic herbal beer Ecks until the 1980s. Throughout the middle years of the century the Brewery also supplied the town of Beechworth with ice. In the closing decades it produced and home-delivered soft drinks, which were eventually replaced by bulk spring water sales and delivery under the name ‘Snowline mountain spring water.’ The Brewery has never ceased producing its range of traditional cordials.

=== Brewery revival ===
In late 2017, the Brewery was taken over by new owners, who commenced restoring its historic buildings and the original name of Billson's was restored. Moves were made to expand brewing and beverage manufacturing operations to the fullness of their original scope, as well as expanding tourist facilities.

=== Administration ===
On 31 July 2024, the Brewery owners announced it was going into voluntary administration.

In December, the company avoided collapse, by being placed into deed of company arrangement, and the brand and RTD range was acquired by The Coca-Cola Company, with the remaining operations trading under a new name. Felicity Cowan commented it "will allow us to dedicate ourselves to what we love most: the Beechworth venue experience and our historic cordial range. We’ll also have more time to focus on our passion for soda, liqueurs, beer and alpine spring water." The deal is expected to close at the end of January 2025, with the parties citing the brand being in the "best possible" hands.

=== Post-sale restructured businesses ===
As of 1 February 2025, the Billson's website redirects to the Last St. URL address with many vestigal references to Billson's including in its products, as they begin to transition to the new company structure.

On c. 7 February, Last Street announced it would also rename its non-alcoholic range to Isabella's, named after Isabella Billson.

In March 2025, it rechristened the building and announced it will also be making jam, their first food item, under the brand name Beth & Bella's, inspired by Isabella Billson and her mother in-law Elizabeth.

In May, it marked the beginning of the new range by holding a "Old Label Flash Sale" to liquidate its remaining old brands and select varieties.

== Historic buildings and equipment ==
Billson's Brewery features a range of historic buildings centred on an original four-storey tower brewery built in 1872-3. The brewery was organised on the ‘gravitational principle’, so that the raw materials started at the top of the building and moved downwards in each successive stage of the brewing process. Billson's tower is thought to be the oldest surviving tower brewery building in Australia. Billson's original manufacturing floors and cellars are now open to the public.

Billson's also retains several pieces of original equipment. A fifteen-head Albro All British filler (bottling machine) built in 1922 is still used in daily operations. The tubular Cornish steam boiler (manufactured by Miller and Co Machinery of Melbourne and Bendigo), which once powered a horizontal steam engine; remains at the side of the brewing tower. Long-time employee Fred Wyatt maintained and ran this boiler until the early 1990s. Mild steel ship tanks manufactured by Lancaster and Co (of Bow) that once held water for the brewing process have stayed in the roof-space of the tower. Smaller items include original copper brewing vats, and the steam whistle once used to sound the beginning and end of shifts.

== See also ==
- Beer in Australia
- List of soft drink producers
- Bickford's Australia
- Schweppes Australia
- Cascade Brewery
- Swan Brewery
