= Malcolm McKenzie (Australian politician) =

Australian politician

Malcolm Kenneth McKenzie (January 1849 – 16 June 1927) was an Australian politician.

He was born in Broadford to grazier Alexander McKenzie and Mary née McCracken. He attended Scotch College and then worked on his father's property, which he inherited upon his father's death. He married Hannah Le Procka Cain, with whom he had two sons. In May 1892, he was elected to the Victorian Legislative Assembly for Anglesey, by which time he was totally blind.

He was defeated in February 1903 and contested Upper Goulburn unsuccessfully in 1904, 1907 and 1908, before winning re-election in December 1911. He served as a backbench Liberal and Nationalist until his retirement from politics in 1920. McKenzie died in Caulfield in 1927.

Victorian Legislative Assembly
Preceded by Thomas Hunt	Member for Anglesey; 1892–1903	Succeeded by Thomas Hunt
Preceded by George Cookson	Member for Upper Goulburn; 1911–1920	Succeeded by Edwin Mackrell
