= Electoral district of Kilmore and Anglesey =

Kilmore and Anglesey Victoria—Legislative Assembly
- State: Victoria
- Created: 1877
- Abolished: 1889
- Demographic: Rural

Kilmore and Anglesey was an electoral district of the Legislative Assembly in the Australian state of Victoria centred on the town of Kilmore from 1877 to 1889.

The Electoral district of Kilmore (1856–1877) preceded Kilmore and Anglesey. Thomas Hunt was the last member for Kilmore. Kilmore and Anglesey was abolished in 1889, the new Electoral district of Kilmore, Dalhousie and Lancefield was created and Electoral district of Anglesey recreated the same year. Thomas Hunt was member for Anglesey from 1889 to 1892.

== Member for Kilmore and Anglesey ==
Member	Term
Thomas Hunt	May 1877 – March 1889
