= Wollaston Heily =

Australian politician

Wollaston Bruce Heily (25 February 1884 – 1 October 1963) was an Australian politician.

He was born in Rushworth to medical practitioner John Vickers Heily and Annie Jack. He attended state schools and became a clerk for the Commercial Bank before farming on the family property at Rushworth. On 11 July 1912 he married Elsie Williamson, with whom he had a daughter. He remarried on 4 October 1920 to Constance Rees Brocklebank, with whom he had two sons. He served on Waranga Shire Council from 1939 to 1955 and was president from 1948 to 1949. He was president of the Rushworth branch of the Country Party, and in 1943 won a by-election for the Victorian Legislative Assembly seat of Waranga. His seat was abolished at the 1945 election and he was defeated running for Rodney. In 1949 he joined the Liberal and Country Party and ran again as their candidate for Rodney in 1950. Heily died at Rushworth in 1963.

Victorian Legislative Assembly
Preceded by Ernest Coyle	Member for Waranga; 1943–1945	Abolished
