= Alfred Billson (Australian politician) =

Australian politician

Aftred Billson
- Caricature of Alfred Arthur Billso by David Law
- In office 1901–1902

Victorian Legislative Assembly Member for Electoral district of Bogong

Victoria Legislative Assembly - Member for Electoral district of Ovens
- In office 1904–1927

Personal details
- Born: 11 January 1858 Wooragee, Colony of Victoria, Australia
- Died: 31 October 1930 (aged 72) Toorak, Victoria
- Occupation: Politician, brewer

Alfred Arthur (A.A.) Billson (11 January 1858 – 31 October 1930) was an Australian politician, government minister and brewer.

== Biography ==
=== Early life ===
Billson was born at Wooragee, Colony of Victoria to English Australian brewer and politician George Billson and Isabella Blades. He attended Beechworth Grammar School and Scotch College before succeeding his father as a brewer.

On 28 June 1881 he married Laura Annie Fielder, with whom he had five children.

=== Brewery company ===
Billson's Brewery, the family's brewery company, that was established in 1865 became the Anglo-Australian Brewery in 1892 (incorporated in 1902), which was amalgamated with brother George Henry Billson's Albury Brewing and Malting Company, to become the Border United Co-operative Breweries, Ltd in 1911. This sold out to a newly formed company, Murray Breweries, 1914.

=== Political career ===
Billson served on Beechworth Shire Council from 1884 to 1893 and from 1895 to 1910, with three terms as president (1888–89, 1899–1901, 1908–09).

In 1901 Billson won a by-election for the Victorian Legislative Assembly seat of Bogong as a ministerial liberal, but he was defeated in 1902. He returned to the Assembly in 1904 as the member for Ovens. He voted against the Bent government, but was part of the Liberal grouping until 1917, when he joined the Economy Party faction of the Nationalists.

From 1909 to 1912 he was Minister of Railways; he held the position again from February to December 1913. He was also Minister of Public Instruction from 1909 to 1913, and Minister of Mines and Forests in 1913. From 1921 to 1926 he was Chairman of Committees.

Billson retired from politics in 1927, and died in Toorak, Victoria in 1930.

Victorian Legislative Assembly
Preceded by Isaac Isaacs	Member for Bogong; 1901–1902	Succeeded by John Fletcher
Preceded by Thomas Ashworth	Member for Ovens; 1904–1927	Abolished
