= Daniel Cameron (Australian politician) =

Australian politician (c.1819–1906)

Daniel Cameron (c.1819 – 3 January 1906) was a miner and politician in colonial Victoria, a member of the Victorian Legislative Council and later, the Victorian Legislative Assembly.

Cameron was born in Perthshire, Scotland and arrived in Melbourne in 1851 or 1852 and soon went to Beechworth, Victoria. There he mined for gold and became a gold buyer for the Bank of New South Wales.

In 1855, Cameron decided to run for the unicameral Victorian Legislative Council for the seat of Ovens, but lacked the £2000 required to run. His friends raised the funds for him and on 15 November 1855, Cameron was elected as the first local member of the area. To celebrate, he rode into the nearby town of Beechworth on a horse from a nearby circus that had its horseshoes shod with gold. A sculpture of a golden horseshoe was erected in the town in 1964 to commemorate the event.

He held the seat until the original Council was abolished in March 1856.

Cameron was elected to the Legislative Assembly seat of Ovens in November 1856, resigning in March 1857. He died in Lilydale, Victoria on 3 January 1906. He was unmarried.

Victorian Legislative Council
New district	Member for Ovens; 15 November 1855 – March 1856	Original Council abolished
Victorian Legislative Assembly
New district	Member for Ovens; November 1856 – March 1857	Succeeded by John Wood
