= Electoral district of Anglesey =

Former state electoral district of Victoria, Australia

Coordinates: 37°10′S 145°15′E

Anglesey Victoria—Legislative Assembly
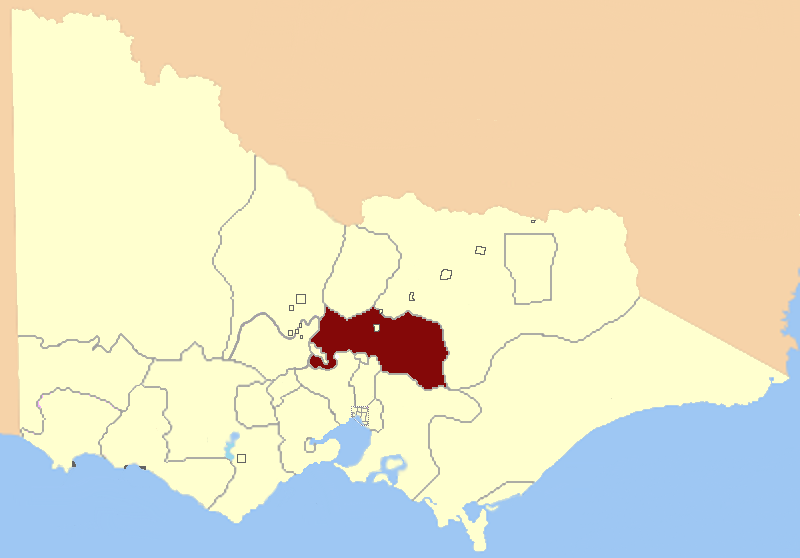
- Location in Victoria, 1856
- State: Victoria
- Dates current: 1856–1859, 1889–1904
- Demographic: Rural

The electoral district of Anglesey was an electoral district of the Legislative Assembly in the Australian state of Victoria.

The district of Anglesey was one of the initial districts of the first Victorian Legislative Assembly, 1856. Its area was defined in the Victoria Constitution Act 1855 (18 & 19 Vict. c. 55) as containing the County of Anglesey and part of the County of Dalhousie, excepting the area included in the electoral districts of Kyneton Boroughs and Kilmore and the Borough of Seymour.

In between Anglesey's abolition in 1864 and re-creation in 1889, the Electoral district of Kilmore and Anglesey existed from 1877 to 1889, Thomas Hunt was member for its entire existence.

== Members for Anglesey ==
First incarnation (1856–1864)
Member	Term
Peter Snodgrass	1856–1859

District renamed Electoral district of Dalhousie in 1859.

Second incarnation (1889–1904)
Thomas Hunt	1889–1892
Malcolm McKenzie	1892–1903
Thomas Hunt	1903–1904
