= George Billson =

Australian politician (1817–1886)

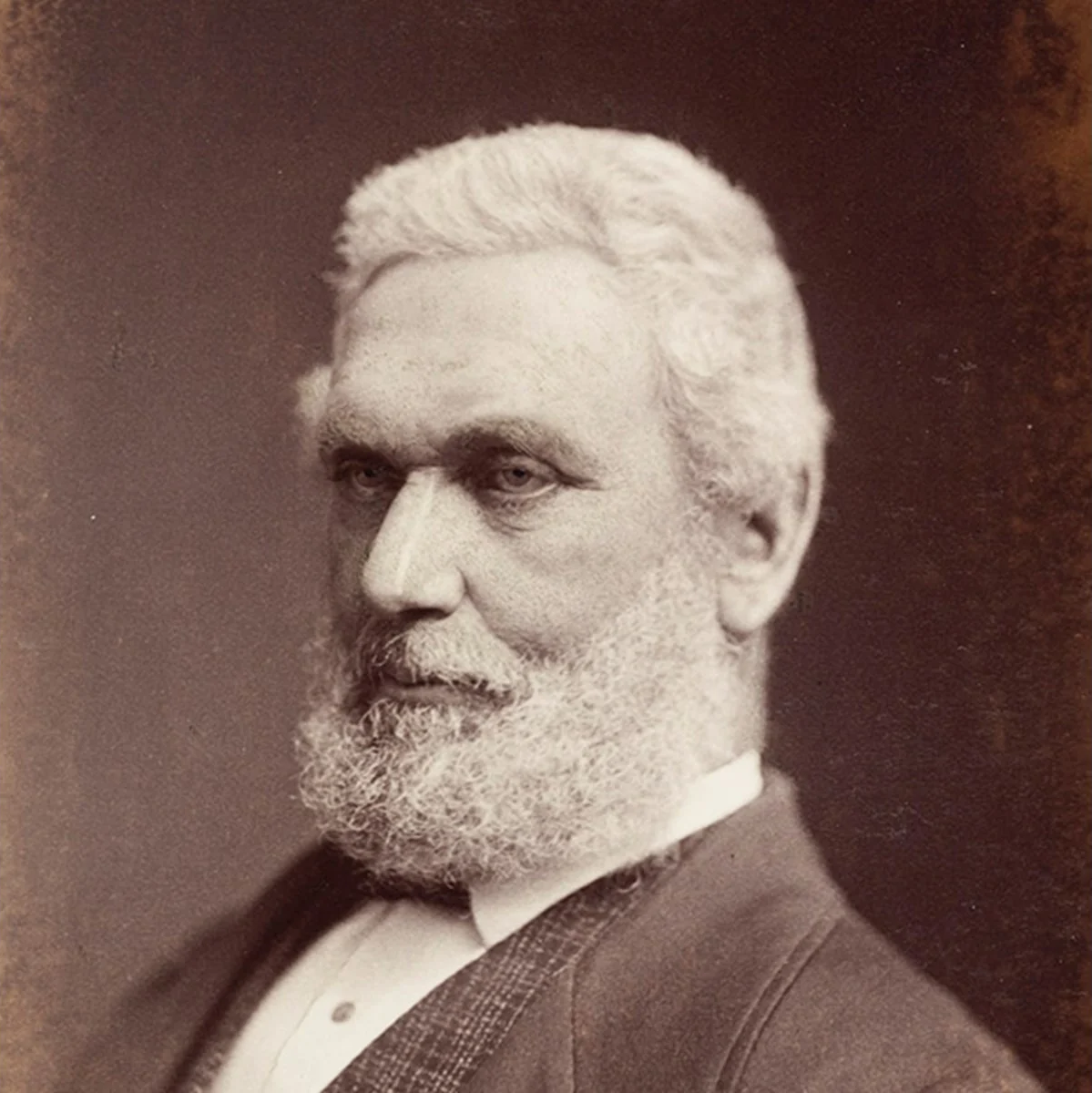

Member of the Victorian Legislative Assembly for Ovens
- In office 1 May 1877 – 1 June 1880 Serving with George Kerferd
- Preceded by: George Verney Smith
- Succeeded by: William Zincke
- In office 1 February 1883 – 1 February 1886
- Preceded by: William Zincke
- Succeeded by: Joseph Ferguson

Personal details
- Born: 12 January 1817 Lincolnshire, England
- Died: 9 February 1865 (aged 48) Beechworth, Colony of Victoria
- Party: Liberal (Protectionist)
- Children: Alfred Billson

George Billson (12 January 1817 – 9 February 1886) was an English-born Australian politician and brewer. He served as a member of the Victorian Legislative Assembly.

== Biography ==
George Billson was born on 12 January 1817 in Lincolnshire, England. His father was Joseph Billson, a surveryor, and his mother was Elizabeth Billson née Antil. In 1842, he travelled to New Zealand for a year, after which he visited Sydney and Valparaíso and returned to England. In 1848, he moved to Adelaide for two years. He spent 1850 to 1852 as a miner in the California gold rush. After that, he moved to Bendigo and worked as a storekeeper.

In 1856, Billson bought land in Beechworth. On 26 March 1864, he married Isabella Blades. He worked on the goldfields in Woods Point from 1864. He settled permanently in Beechworth in 1875. He bought the Oven's Brewery, which became Billson's Brewery in 1865. The business was taken over by his son Alfred Billson in 1882.

Billson was elected to the Beechworth Shire Council in 1868, serving as mayor from 1869 to 1871. He was elected to represent the Electoral district of Ovens in the Victorian Legislative Assembly at the 1877 Victorian colonial election. He supported Graham Berry's liberal government. He won re-election at the February 1880 election but was defeated at the July 1880 election. He won the seat at the 1883 Victorian colonial election and subsequently held the seat until his death.

He died at his house in Beechworth on 9 February 1886, aged 69, from an ongoing heart disease. He had three sons and two daughters, including Alfred. His funeral was attended by thousands, and he was buried in Beechworth cemetery. A letter of condolences from MPs was signed by 24 liberal members of the Legislative Assembly, including future Prime Minister Alfred Deakin and former Premier Graham Berry. His son Alfred later represented the Electoral district of Ovens from 1904 to 1927.
