= William Beazley =

Australian politician

The Honourable William Beazley
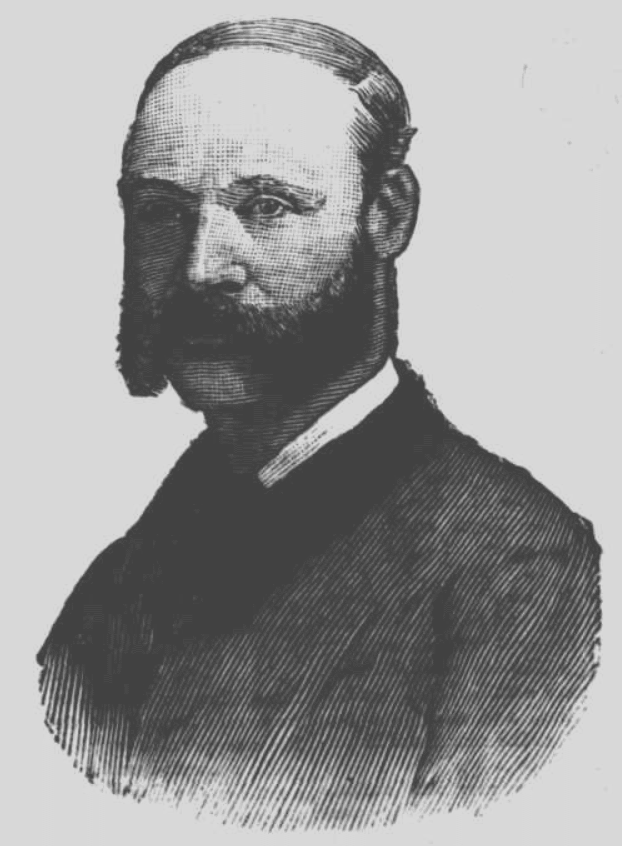

10th Speaker of the Victorian Legislative Assembly
- In office 16 September 1903 – 1 June 1904
- Preceded by: Duncan Gillies
- Succeeded by: Frank Madden

Member of the Legislative Assembly for Abbotsford
- In office 1 June 1904 – 28 June 1912
- Preceded by: District established
- Succeeded by: Gordon Webber

Member of the Legislative Assembly for Collingwood
- In office 28 March 1889 – 1 June 1904
- Preceded by: William Guard Feild
- Succeeded by: District abolished

17th Mayor of Collingwood
- In office 1899–1901
- Preceded by: E. Wilkins
- Succeeded by: Clifton Wheat Smith Aumont
- In office 1894–1895
- Preceded by: John Gahan
- Succeeded by: J. E. Kimberley

1st President of the Collingwood Football Club
- In office 26 February 1892 – 28 June 1912
- Vice President: G. Baldie, J. McDougall, Dan Reddan, Bill Strickland
- Preceded by: Position established (Note: Although the role of President was established, Beazley was associated with the precursor club to Collingwood: Britannia Football Club.)
- Succeeded by: Alfred Cross

Personal details
- Born: William David Beazley; 7 October 1854 Kennington, London, England
- Died: 28 June 1912 (aged 57) Abbotsford, Victoria, Australia
- Party: Labour
- Occupation: Estate agent

William David Beazley (7 October 1854 – 28 June 1912) was an English Australian politician, who was a member of the Victorian Legislative Assembly for the electoral district of Collingwood from 1889 to 1904, and for Abbotsford from 1904 to 1912.

== Biography ==
Beazley was born in London to William and Elizabeth Ann Beazley, née Parker, and arrived in Melbourne as an infant early in 1855. He worked as a saddler and harness marker, and in around 1886 was an estate agent. In March 1889, he was elected as one of two members for Collingwood in the Victorian Legislative Assembly. In 1904, the seat became a single-member electorate, and Beazley was elected for the new district of Abbotsford. In addition to his positions in the Parliament of Victoria, Beazley also served as mayor of Collingwood on two occasions during his parliamentary term, from 1894 to 1895 and from 1899 to 1901.

His appointments included Chairman of Committees from 1897 to 1903, and Speaker of the Victorian Legislative Assembly from 1903 to 1904. He also served on two royal commissions into state banking and old age pensions.

Beazley was also the Founding President of the Collingwood Football Club, and a key person involved in establishing the Club.

Beazley died in office on 28 June 1912. Gordon Webber was elected to replace him at a by-election on 26 July.

== Notes ==
Business positions
New title	President of the Collingwood Football Club; 1892–1912	Succeeded by Alfred Cross
Victorian Legislative Assembly
Preceded by William Feild	Member for Collingwood; 1889–1904	Seat abolished
District created	Member for Abbotsford; 1904–1912	Gordon Webber
Preceded by Duncan Gillies	Speaker of the Victorian Legislative Assembly; 1903–1904	Succeeded by Frank Madden
