= John Gordon (Victorian politician) =

Australian politician

Personal details
- Born: 27 September 1858 Wallan, Victoria
- Died: 3 December 1937 (aged 79) Nagambie
- Party: Nationalist Party of Australia
- Occupation: Storekeeper and grazier

John Gordon (27 September 1858 – 3 December 1937) was an Australian politician.

Gordon was born in Wallan to farmer Neil Gordon and Margaret McKay (both Scottish-born). He grew up around Balmattan, Benalla and Euroa, and became a general storekeeper around 1878 at Nagambie. He also acquired land in the area and grazed sheep and shorthorn cattle.

Gordon served on Goulburn Valley Shire Council from 1896 to 1926 and was thrice president (1899–1900, 1908–09, 1917–18). In 1911 he won a by-election for the Victorian Legislative Assembly seat of Waranga. A Liberal and then a Nationalist, he served as a minister without portfolio from 1923 to 1924 and as Minister of Agriculture and Water Supply from March to July 1924.

The annual premiers in the Waranga North East Football Association were presented with the John Gordon Shield between 1913 and 1926.

Gordon retired in 1929, and died at Nagambie in 1937.

Victorian Legislative Assembly
Preceded by Martin Cussen	Member for Waranga; 1911–1927	Succeeded by Ernest Coyle
