= Charles Merrett =

Australian merchant and soldier

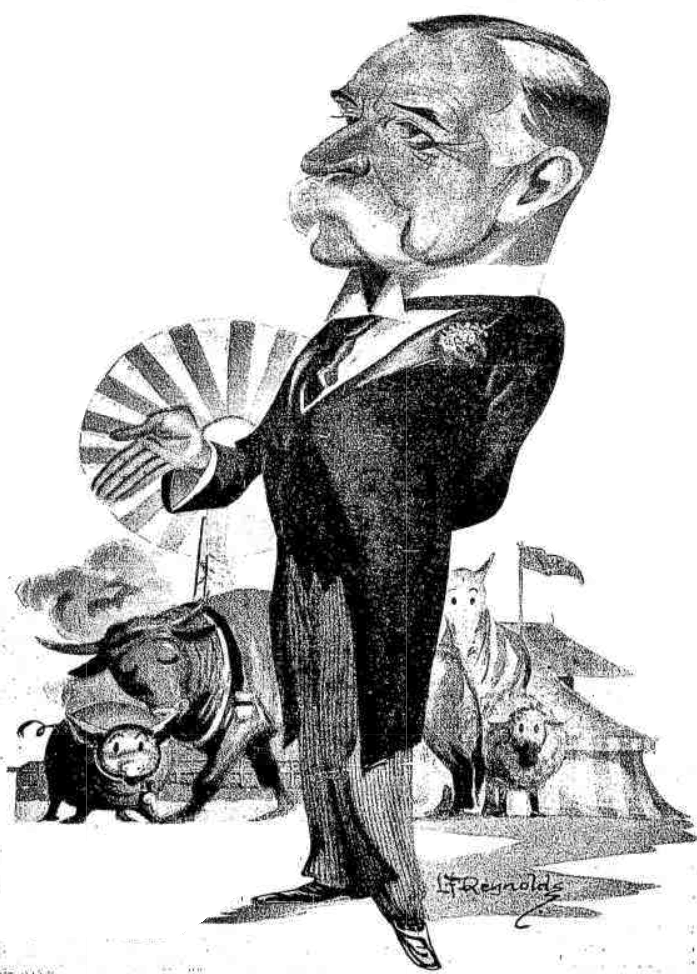
1927 caricature by Reynolds

Colonel Sir Charles Edward Merrett CBE (28 January 1863 – 11 November 1948) was an Australian merchant, agriculturist and political activist.

Merrett was born at South Yarra in Melbourne to civil servant Samuel Headen Merrett and Sarah Ashton, née Baxter. His father died in 1878 and Charles, despite being a graduate from Melbourne Grammar School, was unable to attend university and instead became an office-boy at a merchants' and manufacturer's representation firm in 1880. By 1890 he had risen to become a partner in the business; he would eventually be managing director in 1916. He married Annie Florence Slocombe on 21 April 1891. He joined the St Kilda Rifles in 1880 and transferred to the Victorian Mounted Rifles in 1883, holding the posts of lieutenant and quartermaster (1889) and captain (1892). He later transferred to the Australian Light Horse and was promoted major in 1905; in 1915 he became lieutenant-colonel of the 5th Light Horse Brigade and the oldest serving officer in the Light Horse. Despite his wishes he remained in Australia during World War I and retired from the armed services in 1920 as a colonel.

In 1914, Merrett travelled to the United Kingdom as Captain of the Australian Rifle Team in the Kolapore Match at Bisley. He went on to serve as the Chairman of the National Rifle Association of Australia between 1921 and 1946.

In 1915 Merrett was appointed president of the Royal Agricultural Society of Victoria he would serve a record term of 32 years, retiring in 1947. He was involved in founding the Young Farmers and the Country Women's Association. He was also politically involved, and in 1913 ran for the federal seat of Melbourne Ports for the Liberal Party. His later career tended towards organisational politics but he became disenchanted with the Nationalist Party and instead he and Thomas Ashworth founded the Liberal Union, a breakaway group opposed to Billy Hughes' leadership. Although the Union only operated as a political entity at the 1922 election, when it elected two candidates to the House of Representatives, it continued to endorse Nationalist candidates throughout the 1920s. He would later be involved in the downfall of the Allan-Peacock state government in 1927, forming the short-lived Australian Liberal Party.

Merrett served as a councillor on the City of South Melbourne from 1915 to 1937, and was mayor from 1922 to 1923. He was also the chairman of a number of organisations, including the Canned Fruits Export Control Board, the Big Brother Movement, the New Settlers League, the State Employment Council and the Society for the Protection of Animals. In 1929 he was appointed Commander of the Order of the British Empire, and he was knighted in 1934. He died at Brighton in 1948.
