= Florence Johnson (feminist) =

Australian feminist, unionist and educator

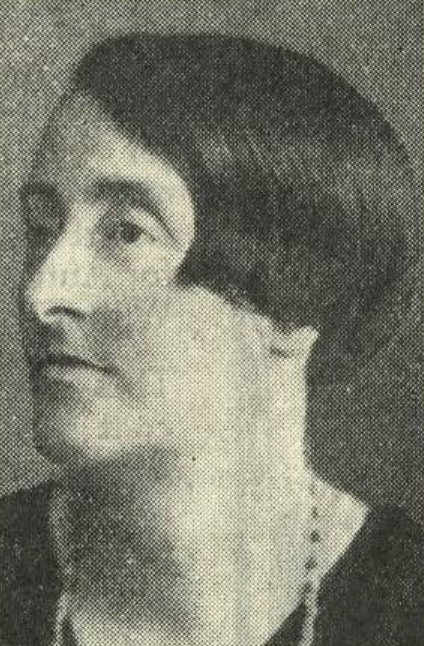
- Johnson in 1927
- Born: Florence Ethel Johnson; 26 March 1884; Port Melbourne, Victoria, Australia
- Died: 6 November 1934 (aged 50); Malvern, Victoria, Australia
- Other name: Florence Ethel Ingram
- Occupations: Feminist, unionist and educator

Florence Ethel Johnson (26 March 1884 – 6 November 1934) was an Australian feminist, unionist and educator.

== Life ==
Johnson became a pupil-teacher at South Preston State School in 1900. In 1906 she was promoted to head teacher at Arcadia South State School. Following an 18-year career teaching in State schools in Victoria she took up the position of secretary of the women's section of the Victorian State Service Federation in 1919.

She lobbied for better pay for women teachers and women in the Victorian public service, including nurses and secretarial workers. Through her efforts, women teacher's salaries were increased from half to four-fifths of those paid to men. When the Teachers Bill of 1918 was passed it ensured that women were not overlooked for promotion due to their sex.

Johnson stood for the Victorian Legislative Assembly seat of St Kilda in the 1927 State elections, the only woman candidate to contest that year's elections. Representing Independent Labor, she was unsuccessful, but received 20% of the primary vote.

She served as president of the Victorian Women's Teachers' Association, retiring in 1932.

== Personal ==
Johnson married marine engineer Frederick Arthur Ingram in Perth in 1932. She died on 6 November 1934 in St Benedict's private hospital, Malvern, Victoria. Her death notice described her as "dearly beloved wife and comrade of Frederick Arthur Ingram ... Undaunted". Her remains were cremated.
