= Electoral district of Ovens =

Former electoral district in Victoria, Australia

Coordinates: 36°35′S 146°55′E

Ovens Victoria—Legislative Assembly
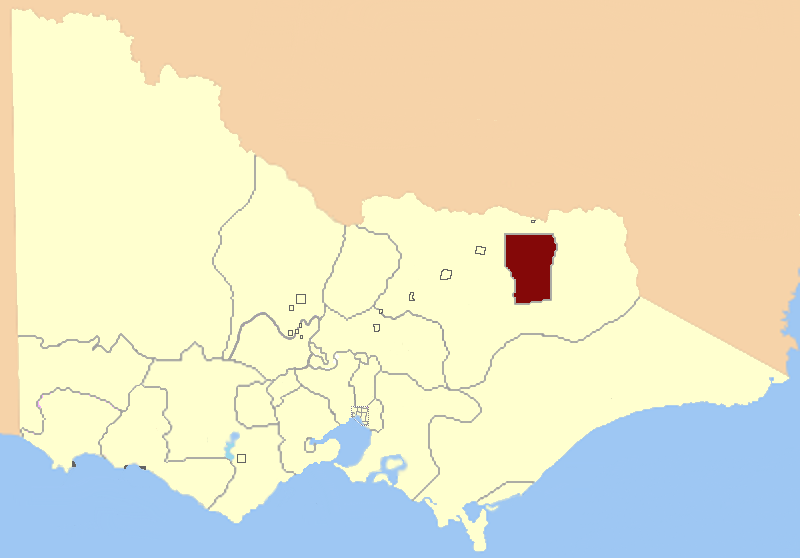
- Location in Victoria, 1856
- State: Victoria
- Created: 1856
- Abolished: 1927
- Namesake: The Ovens
- Demographic: Rural

Ovens (or The Ovens) was an electoral district of the Legislative Assembly in the Australian state of Victoria from 1856 to 1927. It was based in northern Victoria, bordered by the Ovens River in the south-west and included the town of Beechworth, Victoria.

The district of Ovens was one of the initial districts of the first Victorian Legislative Assembly, 1856. It was defined in the Victorian Constitution Act 1855 (taking effect at the 1856 elections) as:

Commencing at the Junction of Whorouly Creek with the River Ovens, bounded on the West by a Line bearing North Twenty Miles, thence on the North by a Line bearing East to the Little River, on the East by the Little River to its Source in the dividing Range, thence by the dividing Range and a Line South to a Point on the Ovens River Nine Miles above its Junction with the River Buckland; on the South by a Line from the last-mentioned Point to the Source of the River Buckland, thence by the dividing Range to the Source of the River Buffalo, and again on the South and West by that River and the Ovens to the commencing Point.

Ovens was superseded by Electoral district of Wangaratta and Ovens in 1927.

== Members for Ovens ==
One member initially, two from the increase in members of 1859. One again from the redistribution of 1889 when the Electoral district of Wangaratta and Rutherglen, amongst others, was created.

Member 1	Term	Member 2	Term
Daniel Cameron (Note: Daniel Cameron was also member for Ovens in the unicameral Victorian Legislative Council December 1855 to March 1856.)	Nov. 1856 – Mar. 1857		
John Wood	Apr. 1857 (Note: by-election) – July 1861		
John Wood	Apr. 1857 – July 1861	Alexander Keefer	Oct. 1859 – Mar. 1860
John Wood	Apr. 1857 – July 1861	John Donald	Mar. 1860 – July 1861
William Charles Weekes	Aug. 1861 – Aug. 1864	Peter Wright	Aug. 1861 – Aug. 1864
George Verney Smith	Nov. 1864 – Apr. 1877	George Kerferd	Nov. 1864 – Jan. 1886
George Billson	May 1877 – June 1880	George Kerferd	Nov. 1864 – Jan. 1886
William Zincke	July 1880 – Feb. 1883	George Kerferd	Nov. 1864 – Jan. 1886
George Billson	Feb. 1883 – Feb. 1886	George Kerferd	Nov. 1864 – Jan. 1886
Joseph Ferguson	Mar. 1886 – Mar. 1889	Ferguson Tuthill	Jan. 1886 – Mar. 1889

Single Member District 1889–1927
Member	Party	Term
Joseph Ferguson	Unaligned	1889–1894
J. A. Isaacs	Unaligned	1894–1902
Thomas Ashworth	Unaligned	1902–1904
Alfred Billson	Unaligned	1904–1916
Alfred Billson	Nationalist	1916–1924
Alfred Billson	Liberal	1924–1927
