= Electoral district of Upper Goulburn =

Former state electoral district in Victoria, Australia

Upper Goulburn Victoria—Legislative Assembly
- State: Victoria
- Created: 1904
- Abolished: 1945
- Demographic: Rural
- Coordinates: 37°10′S 145°20′E

Upper Goulburn was an electoral district of the Legislative Assembly in the Australian state of Victoria, from 1904 to 1945. It was based in northern Victoria. Upper Goulburn was created in 1904 after the abolition of the Electoral district of Delatite and the Electoral district of Anglesey. Thomas Hunt was the last member for Anglesey (1903 to 1904) and first for Upper Goulburn.

The area of the district of Upper Goulburn was defined in the Victorian Electoral Districts Boundaries Act 1903, taking effect at the 1904 election.

== Members for Upper Goulburn ==
Member	Party	Term
Thomas Hunt	Unaligned	1904–1908
George Cookson	Liberal	1908–1911
Malcolm McKenzie	Liberal	1911–1917
Malcolm McKenzie	Nationalist	1917–1920
Edwin Mackrell	Country	1920–1945
