= Electoral district of Walhalla =

Former state electoral district of Victoria, Australia

Coordinates: 37°57′S 146°27′E

Walhalla Victoria—Legislative Assembly
- State: Victoria
- Created: 1904
- Abolished: 1945
- Namesake: Town of Walhalla
- Demographic: Rural

The Electoral district of Walhalla was an electoral district of the Victorian Legislative Assembly.

== Members ==
Member	Party	Term
Albert Harris	Unaligned	1904–1910
Samuel Barnes	Comm. Liberal / Nationalist	1910–1927
William Moncur	Country	1927–1945

== See also ==
- Parliaments of the Australian states and territories
- List of members of the Victorian Legislative Assembly
