= Henry Zwar =

Australian politician

Henry Zwar OBE
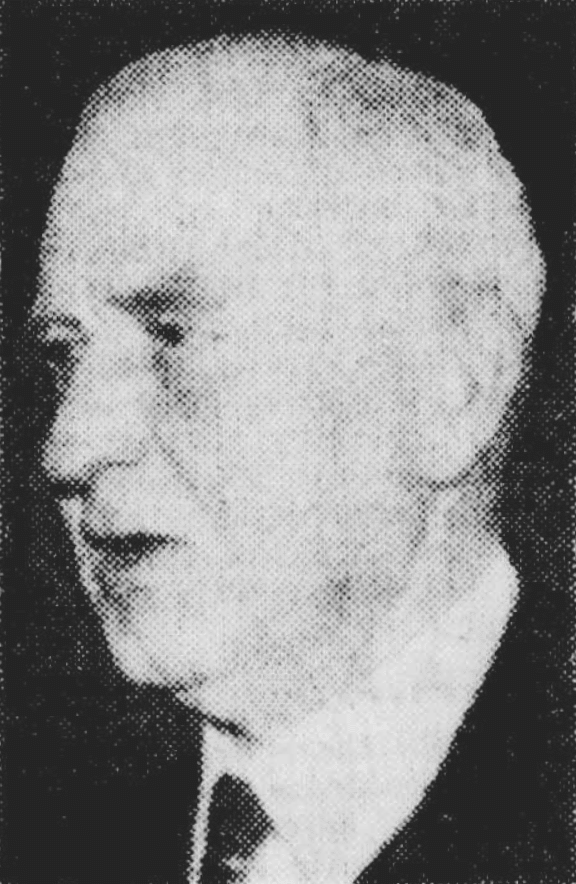

Member of the Victorian Legislative Assembly for Heidelberg
- In office 14 May 1932 – 3 October 1945
- Preceded by: Gordon Webber
- Succeeded by: District abolished

Personal details
- Born: Henry Peter Zwar; 2 December 1873 Broadford, Victoria
- Died: 12 January 1959 (aged 85) Kew, Melbourne, Victoria, Australia
- Resting place: Preston Cemetery
- Party: United Australia Party
- Spouse: Jane Frier Cunningham (m. 1898)
- Relations: Albert Zwar (brother) William Zwar (brother) Michael Zwar (father) Agnes Zwar nee Zimmer (mother) Herman Richard Zwar (son) Enid Jean Zwar (daughter) Beryl Carrick Hughes nee Zwar (daughter)
- Occupation: Tanner; Preston City Council councillor and mayor

Henry Peter Zwar, OBE (2 December 1873 – 12 January 1959) was an Australian liberal/conservative politician, local government councillor, local government head, Member of Lower House and tannery owner.

== Early life ==
Zwar was born in 1873 in Broadford, Victoria, the younger brother of Albert Zwar. His parents, Michael Zwar and Agnes Zimmer, were Sorbs from Bautzen in Saxony, Germany, who had sought asylum after taking part in the 1848 revolution. The British government told them if they emigrated to Australia, they would be treated as British subjects, and they moved to Broadford in 1850.

== Political career ==
Zwar was elected as a United Australia Party member of the Victorian Legislative Assembly for Heidelberg at the 1932 state election. He was re-elected four times for the United Australia Party, and regularly attended and voted in party meetings, though he did not necessarily vote the party line, claiming "conscience as the final court of appeal".

The UAP had become the Liberal Party by the 1945 election, at which an electoral redistribution abolished Heidelberg, placing Zwar in the new, notionally Labor seat of Preston, while shifting the more conservative areas of his old electorate to the new seat of Ivanhoe. In October 1945, Zwar announced that he would not be an endorsed Liberal candidate for the forthcoming election and would contest as an Independent Liberal; he also stated that he did not belong to the Liberal Party and paid no party subscription. He was defeated by 143 votes by Labor candidate and Victoria Cross holder William Ruthven.

== Later life ==
Henry and Jane Zwar lived briefly in Roseberry Avenue, Preston, before moving to nearby Gower Street, where they lived in a house named Rothesay (near the current Preston Library.) The site is now occupied by a childcare centre.

Zwar was president of the Preston Football Club from 1926 until 1944, then served as president of the Victorian Football Association from May 1944 until 1947. Zwar Park in Preston is named in his honour, as is the adjoining Zwar Oval.

Zwar died in Kew, Melbourne, Victoria. He is buried at Preston Cemetery (plot PRE-C2-043), as are his wife Jane Zwar (nee Cunningham) (plot PRE-C2-042) and two of his three children, Herman Richard Zwar (same plot as Henry) and Enid Jean Zwar (same plot as Jane). Henry and Jane's other daughter Beryl Carrick Hughes (nee Zwar) is buried at Fawkner Memorial Park, Garden Bed F, Position 28.

Victorian Legislative Assembly
Preceded by Gordon Webber	Member for Heidelberg; 1932–1945	District abolished
