= Thomas Ashworth =

Australian politician

Member of the Victorian Parliament for Ovens
- In office 1902–1904

Personal details
- Born: Thomas Ramsden Ashworth Junior; 5 December 1864 Richmond, Victoria
- Died: 23 August 1935 (aged 70) Fitzroy, Victoria
- Resting place: Melbourne General Cemetery
- Spouse(s): Emily Ashweek (1888-1922); Marguerita Adele Young (1930-1935)
- Profession: Architect

Thomas Ramsden Ashworth (5 December 1864 – 23 August 1935) was an Australian politician.

Born in Richmond to medical practitioner Thomas Ramsden Ashworth and Mary Jane Leeson, his family moved to Bombala in New South Wales when he was a child but returned to Melbourne after his father's death in 1876. He spent four years at sea before taking various jobs as a carpenter, builder, architect and estate agent. In 1888 he married Emily Ashweek; later, in 1894, he married Marguerite Adele Young. He was President of the Victorian Free Trade Association from 1898 to 1902 and a South Melbourne City Councillor from 1895 to 1898. From 1902 to 1904 he was the member for Ovens in the Victorian Legislative Assembly. Ashworth died in 1935 in Fitzroy.
