= William Moncur =

Australian politician

William Anderson Moncur (14 July 1886 – 20 November 1962) was an Australian politician.

Moncur was born in Thoona to schoolteacher Alexander Moncur and Margaret Ann Snow. He attended state schools and then University High School, becoming a schoolteacher. He taught across regional Victoria until 1914; he then served with the 6th Battalion during World War I. On 12 October 1918 he married Laura Dorothea Savige, with whom he had two sons. On his return he resumed teaching and also acquired a farm at Thorpdale.

In 1927 Moncur was elected to the Victorian Legislative Assembly for Walhalla, representing the Country Party. In 1940 he unsuccessfully challenged Albert Dunstan for the party leadership. His seat was abolished in 1945 and he was defeated contesting Gippsland North. Moncur served on Narracan Shire Council from 1936 to 1945. He died at Traralgon on 20 November 1962.

Victorian Legislative Assembly
Preceded by Samuel Barnes	Member for Walhalla; 1927–1945	Abolished
