= Edwin Mackrell =

Australian politician

Edwin Joseph Mackrell (16 December 1878 – 24 March 1965) was an Australian politician.

Mackrell was born in Strathbogie to farmer George Mackrell and Mary Ann Perkins. He attended state school until the age of fourteen, when he began work in a butter factory at Mansfield. By 1896 he was managing a butter factory at Fish Creek. He went to the goldfields in Western Australia in 1901, returning to Victoria in 1905 but travelling to South Africa in 1908. On 15 July 1910 he married Elsie Flora Harris, with whom he had three daughters. He remained in South Africa until 1916, when he returned to farm at first Boho and then, from 1918, Strathbogie.

In 1920 Mackrell was elected to the Victorian Legislative Assembly for Upper Goulburn, representing the Country Party. He was Assistant Minister of Railways from 1924 to 1927, and later served as Minister of Sustenance from 1935 to 1936, Minister of Labour from 1936 to 1943, Minister of Public Health from 1942 to 1943, and Minister of Water Supply and Decentralisation in Ian Macfarlan's stop-gap ministry in 1945. In supporting Macfarlan against Albert Dunstan he had been expelled from the Country Party, and he was defeated contesting Goulburn in 1945. Mackrell died in Canterbury on 24 March 1965.

Victorian Legislative Assembly
Preceded by Malcolm McKenzie	Member for Upper Goulburn; 1920–1945	Abolished
