= Electoral district of Waranga =

Former state electoral district of Victoria, Australia

Waranga Victoria—Legislative Assembly
- State: Victoria
- Created: 1904
- Abolished: 1945
- Demographic: Rural

Waranga was an electoral district of the Legislative Assembly in the Australian state of Victoria from 1904 to 1945.

== Members for Waranga ==
Member	Party	Term
John Morrissey	Unaligned	1904–1907
John Walter Mason	Unaligned	1907–1908
Martin Cussen	Liberal	1908–1911
John Gordon	Liberal	1911–1917
John Gordon	Nationalist	1917–1927
Ernest Coyle	Nationalist	1927–1931
Ernest Coyle	UAP	1931–1933
Ernest Coyle	Country	1933–1943
Wollaston Heily	Country	1943–1945
