= Samuel Barnes (Australian politician) =

Australian politician

Samuel Barnes (c. 1865 – 13 March 1951) was an Australian politician.

He was born in Cornwall, England to miner Samuel Meyn Barnes and Jane Mitchell. He was a timber worker and, after suffering a serious leg injury, emigrated to Victoria around 1886. He worked for the Treasury Department before becoming a mine manager at Walhalla. He held a supervisory position during the construction of the Long Tunnel mines, and served on the Walhalla Shire Council from 1905 to 1910.

In 1910, Barnes was elected to the Victorian Legislative Assembly for Walhalla as a Liberal, later transitioning to the Nationalist Party. He was briefly a minister without portfolio from 18 September 1917 to 29 November 1917, and served as Minister of Railways and Mines from 21 March 1918 to 7 September 1923. He lost his seat to a Country Party candidate in March 1927 and retired from politics. Barnes died in Fitzroy in 1951.

Victorian Legislative Assembly
| Preceded by Albert Harris | Member for Walhalla; 1910–1927 | Succeeded by William Moncur |
