= Ernest Coyle =

Australian politician

Ernest Augustine Coyle (2 March 1874 – 31 August 1943) was an Australian politician.

Coyle was born in Eaglehawk to blacksmith Thomas Coyle and Harriet Kate Goodfellow. Orphaned at a young age, he grew up with his grandmother in Rushworth, where he attended state schools. He worked as a stationer and hairdresser until around 1910, when he co-founded a stock and station agency. In 1905 he married Isabella Ann McDonald, with whom he had three children.

In 1927 Coyle was elected to the Victorian Legislative Assembly as the Nationalist member for Waranga. A member of the United Australia Party from 1931, he defected to the Country Party in 1933. A long-time sufferer from Paget's disease, Coyle died in Rushworth in 1943.

Victorian Legislative Assembly
Preceded by John Gordon	Member for Waranga; 1927–1943	Succeeded by Wollaston Heily
