= Gordon Webber (politician) =

Australian politician

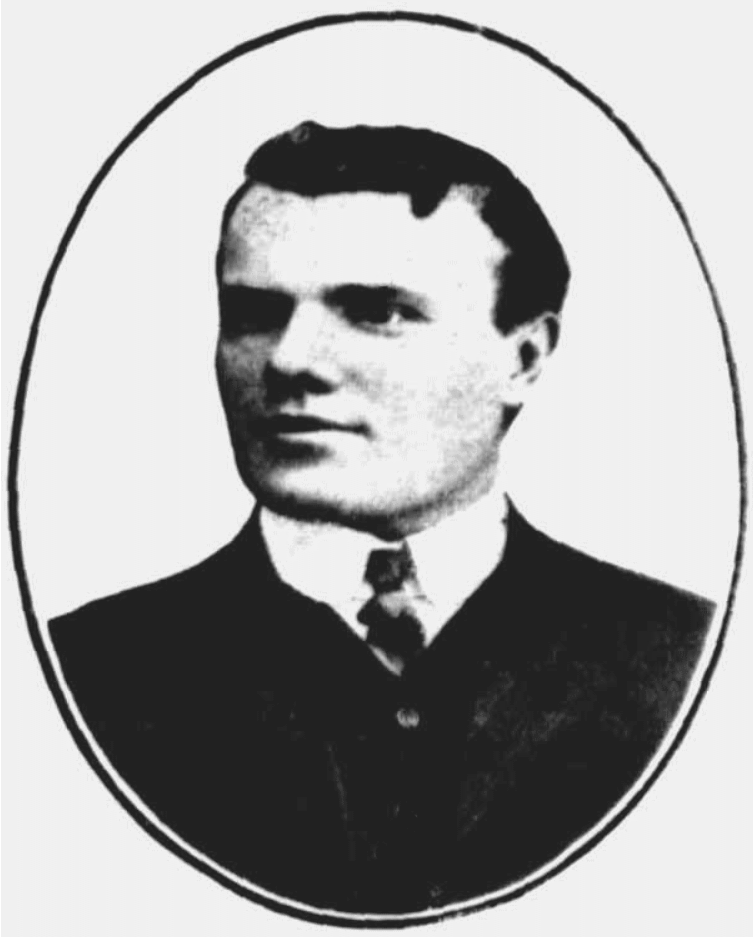

Member of the Victorian Legislative Assembly for Abbotsford
- In office 1 July 1912 – 1 March 1927
- Preceded by: William Beazley
- Succeeded by: Seat abolished

Member of the Victorian Legislative Assembly for Heidelberg
- In office 1 April 1927 – 1 April 1932
- Preceded by: Seat established
- Succeeded by: Henry Zwar

Personal details
- Born: 6 January 1885 Richmond, Victoria, Australia
- Died: 4 June 1960 (aged 75) Mordialloc, Victoria, Australia

Gordon Charles Webber (6 January 1885 – 4 June 1960) was an Australian politician. Webber was born in Richmond to carpenter Henry Moore Webber and Harriett Bastin. He attended state school in Collingwood and then worked as a saddler. He eventually became a wickerworker, and served as president of the Wickerworkers' Union. On 6 February 1915 he married Doris Edna Brown, with whom he had one son; he would later remarry Maud Glenister on 12 January 1922 and have a further three children. During World War I he served with the 4th Light Horse as a stretcher-bearer.

Webber joined the Labor Party in 1901, and was president of the state executive from 1910 to 1914 and from 1921 to 1922. He also served on Richmond City Council from 1908 to 1920 and was its first Labor mayor from 1913 to 1915. In 1912 he won a by-election for the Victorian Legislative Assembly seat of Abbotsford (in 1927 he would transfer to Heidelberg). He was a minister without portfolio from July to November 1924 and from 1927 to 1928 and Minister of Sustenance from 1929 to 1932. He lost his seat in 1932 and became a newsagent. He died in Mordialloc in 1960.

Victorian Legislative Assembly
Preceded by William Beazley	Member for Abbotsford; 1912–1927	Abolished
New seat	Member for Heidelberg; 1927–1932	Succeeded by Henry Zwar
