= Electoral district of Heidelberg =

Heidelberg Victoria—Legislative Assembly
- State: Victoria
- Created: 1927
- Abolished: 1945
- Namesake: Suburb of Heidelberg
- Demographic: Metropolitan
- Coordinates: 37°45′S 145°04′E

Electoral district of Heidelberg was an electoral district of the Legislative Assembly in the Australian state of Victoria.

== Members for Heidelberg ==
| Member | Party | Term |
|---|---|---|
| Gordon Webber | Labor | 1927–1932 |
| Henry Zwar | United Australia | 1932–1944 |
| Henry Zwar | Liberal | 1944–1945 |
| Henry Zwar | Independent Liberal | 1945 |
