= Australian Liberal Party (1926) =

1920s political party in Australia

- Founder: Charles Merrett
- Founded: 25 December 1926
- Dissolved: 1932
- Preceded by: Liberal Union
- Victorian Legislative Assembly: 2 / 65 (1927−1930)
- South Melbourne City Council: 1 / 12 (1926−1932)
- Brunswick City Council: 1 / 12 (until 1932)

The Australian Liberal Party, also known as the Progressive Liberals, was an Australian political party that operated in the state of Victoria in the late 1920s.

The party was founded in 1926 in preparation for the 1927 state election. It believed that the Nationalist Party had abandoned liberal principles. An urban-based party, it opposed the rural malapportionment that existed in the Victorian Legislative Assembly at the time. At the election, the party succeeded in electing two of its candidates, Frederick Forrest in Caulfield and Burnett Gray in St Kilda. They were both re-elected in 1929 after withstanding strong challenges from the Nationalists. Forrest died in 1930 and Gray lost his seat in 1932, and the party subsequently faded away.
