= 1927 Victorian state election =

Australian state election

| ← 1924 | 9 April 1927 | 1929 → |

All 65 seats in the Legislative Assembly of Victoria 33 seats needed for a majority
- Registered: 850,494
- Turnout: 91.76 (▲32.52 pp)
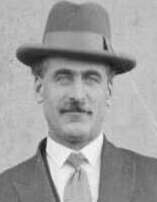

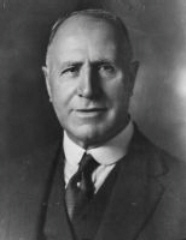

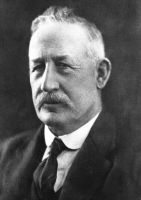

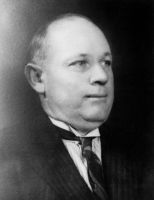
| | First party | Second party |
|---|---|---|
| Leader | Edmond Hogan | Harry Lawson |
| Party | Labor | Nationalist |
| Leader since | 14 April 1926 | 1918 |
| Leader's seat | Warrenheip and Grenville (contested; won) | Castlemaine and Maldon |
| Last election | 27 seats | 19 seats |
| Seats won | 28 seats | 15 seats |
| Seat change | ▲1 | ▼4 |
| Popular vote | 319,848 | 236,428 |
| Percentage | 41.79% | 30.89% |
| Swing | ▲6.92% | ▼8.15% |
| | Third party | Fourth party |
| Leader | John Allan | Albert Dunstan |
| Party | Country | Country Progressive |
| Leader since | 27 November 1917 | April 1926 |
| Leader's seat | Rodney | Korong and Eaglehawk (contested; won) |
| Last election | 13 seats | New party |
| Seats won | 10 seats | 4 seats |
| Seat change | ▼3 | ▲4 |
| Popular vote | 62,218 | 31,849 |
| Percentage | 8.13% | 4.16% |
| Swing | ▼3.84% | ▲4.16% |
Premier before election
John Allan
Country
Elected Premier
Edmond Hogan
Labor

The 1927 Victorian state election was held in the Australian state of Victoria on Saturday, 9 April 1927, to elect the 65 members of the state's Legislative Assembly.

For the first time, a Victorian state election was held on a Saturday, and voting for the Legislative Assembly was compulsory. As a consequence, voter turnout in contested seats increased from 59.24% at the 1924 election to 91.76% at the 1927 election, although the informal vote increased from 1.01% in 1924 to 1.94% in 1927.

== Key dates ==
| Date | Event |
|---|---|
| 4 March 1927 | The Parliament was prorogued, and the Legislative Assembly dissolved. |
| 12 March 1927 | Writs were issued by the Governor to proceed with an election. |
| 21 March 1927 | Close of nominations. |
| 9 April 1927 | Polling day. |
| 30 April 1927 | The writ was returned and the results formally declared. |
| 20 May 1927 | The Hogan Ministry was sworn in. |
| 6 July 1927 | Parliament resumed for business. |

== Results ==
=== Legislative Assembly ===
1927 Victorian state election Legislative Assembly << 1924–1929 >>
| Enrolled voters | 850,494 | | | | |
| Votes cast | 780,399 | | Turnout | 91.76 | +32.53 |
| Informal votes | 15,125 | | Informal | 1.94 | +0.93 |
Summary of votes by party
| Party | Primary votes | % | Swing | Seats | Change |
| Labor | 319,848 | 41.79 | +6.92 | 28 | +1 |
| Nationalist | 236,428 | 30.89 | −8.15 | 15 | −4 |
| Australian Liberal | 67,663 | 8.84 | +8.84 | 2 | +2 |
| Country | 62,218 | 8.13 | −3.84 | 10 | −3 |
| Country Progressive | 31,849 | 4.16 | +4.16 | 4 | +4 |
| Independent | 47,268 | 6.18 | +2.97 | 6 | +5 |
| Total | 765,274 | | | 65 | |

Notes:

- Eight seats were uncontested at this election, and were retained by the incumbent parties:
  - Labor (4): Footscray, Northcote, Port Melbourne, Richmond
  - Nationalist (2): Benambra, Polwarth
  - Country (1): Goulburn Valley
  - Independents (1): Brighton

== Outcome ==
The Allan Country–Nationalist Coalition Government was defeated, and a minority Labor Government, led by Edmund Hogan, took office, but had to resign following a vote of no confidence in the Legislative Assembly in November 1928.

== See also ==
- Candidates of the 1927 Victorian state election
- Members of the Victorian Legislative Assembly, 1927–1929
- 1928 Victorian Legislative Council election
