= Electoral results for the district of Grant =

Victoria, Australia, district election results

This is a list of electoral results for the electoral district of Grant in Victorian state elections.

== Members for Grant ==
First incarnation (1877–1904) — Two members until 1889
Member 1	Term	Member 2	Term
Peter Lalor	May 1877 – Feb 1889	John Rees	May 1877 – Mar 1889
Harry Armytage	Apr 1889 – Sep 1894		
John Percy Chirnside	Oct 1894 – May 1904		

Second incarnation (1927–1967)
Member	Party	Term
Ralph Hjorth	Labor	1927 – 1932
Frederick Holden	United Australia Party	1932 – 1937
Frederick Holden	Independent	1937 – 1940
Frederick Holden	Country	1940 – 1950
Alexander Fraser	Liberal and Country	1950 – 1952
Leslie D'Arcy	Labor	1952 – 1955
Leslie D'Arcy	Labor (Anti-Communist)	1955
Roy Crick	Labor	1955 – 1966
Jack Ginifer	Labor	1966 – 1967

== Election results ==
=== Elections in the 1960s ===
1966 Grant state by-election
Party	Candidate	Votes	%	±%
Labor	Jack Ginifer	25,666	72.6	+16.4
Independent	James Davies	9,774	27.6	+27.6
Total formal votes		35,440	95.0	−1.2
Informal votes		1,879	5.0	+1.2
Turnout		37,319	72.4	−22.0
Labor hold		Swing	N/A	

1964 Victorian state election: Grant
Party	Candidate	Votes	%	±%
Labor	Roy Crick	23,493	56.0	+0.6
Liberal and Country	Francis Hunter	9,940	23.7	+3.8
Democratic Labor	Robert Bainbridge	8,489	20.3	−1.7
Total formal votes		41,922	96.2	−1.2
Informal votes		1,664	3.8	+1.2
Turnout		43,586	94.4	−4.7
Two-party-preferred result
Labor	Roy Crick	24,766	59.1	−2.0
Liberal and Country	Francis Hunter	17,156	40.9	+2.0
Labor hold		Swing	−2.0	

1961 Victorian state election: Grant
Party	Candidate	Votes	%	±%
Labor	Roy Crick	19,305	55.4	−3.9
Democratic Labor	Robert Bainbridge	7,677	22.0	+6.1
Liberal and Country	Max Crellin	6,924	19.9	−4.9
Communist	William Wilson	940	2.7	+2.7
Total formal votes		35,381	97.4	−0.3
Informal votes		940	2.6	+0.3
Turnout		36,321	99.1	+4.5
Two-party-preferred result
Labor	Roy Crick	21,303	61.1	−0.6
Liberal and Country	Max Crellin	14,078	38.9	+0.6
Labor hold		Swing	−0.6	

- The two candidate preferred vote was not counted between the Labor and DLP candidates for Grant.

=== Elections in the 1950s ===
1958 Victorian state election: Grant
Party	Candidate	Votes	%	±%
Labor	Roy Crick	16,188	59.3	
Liberal and Country	John Anderson	6,759	24.8	
Democratic Labor	Maxwell Campbell	4,339	15.9	
Total formal votes		27,286	97.7	
Informal votes		636	2.3	
Turnout		27,922	94.6	
Two-party-preferred result
Labor	Roy Crick	16,839	61.7	
Liberal and Country	John Anderson	10,447	38.3	
Labor hold		Swing		

- Two party preferred vote was estimated.

1955 Victorian state election: Grant
Party	Candidate	Votes	%	±%
Labor	Roy Crick	14,185	51.5	
Liberal and Country	Max Gillett	8,104	29.4	
Labor (A-C)	Leslie D'Arcy	5,275	19.1	
Total formal votes		27,564	98.0	
Informal votes		556	2.0	
Turnout		28,120	94.1	
Two-party-preferred result
Labor	Roy Crick	14,975	54.3	
Liberal and Country	Max Gillett	12,589	45.7	
Labor hold		Swing		

1952 Victorian state election: Grant
Party	Candidate	Votes	%	±%
Labor	Leslie D'Arcy	10,678	60.3	+14.8
Liberal and Country	Alexander Fraser	6,498	36.7	+5.2
Independent	Thomas Fynmore	541	3.0	+3.0
Total formal votes		17,717	98.6	−0.4
Informal votes		251	1.4	+0.4
Turnout		17,968	92.9	+0.5
Two-party-preferred result
Labor	Leslie D'Arcy	10,948	61.8	+12.6
Liberal and Country	Alexander Fraser	6,169	38.2	−12.6
Labor gain from Liberal and Country		Swing	+12.6	

1950 Victorian state election: Grant
Party	Candidate	Votes	%	±%
Labor	Leslie D'Arcy	6,833	45.5	+5.1
Liberal and Country	Alexander Fraser	4,727	31.5	+4.6
Country	Frederick Holden	3,454	23.0	−9.7
Total formal votes		15,014	99.0	+0.1
Informal votes		149	1.0	−0.1
Turnout		15,163	93.4	−0.5
Two-party-preferred result
Liberal and Country	Alexander Fraser	7,627	50.8	+50.8
Labor	Leslie D'Arcy	7,387	49.2	+7.2
Liberal and Country gain from Country		Swing	N/A	

=== Elections in the 1940s ===
1947 Victorian state election: Grant
Party	Candidate	Votes	%	±%
Labor	Horace Hughes	5,637	40.4	−1.4
Country	Frederick Holden	4,573	32.7	−9.3
Liberal	Tom Austin	3,756	26.9	+10.7
Total formal votes		13,966	98.9	+0.2
Informal votes		157	1.1	−0.2
Turnout		14,123	93.4	+6.9
Two-party-preferred result
Country	Frederick Holden	8,105	58.0	+1.4
Labor	Horace Hughes	5,861	42.0	−1.4
Country hold		Swing	+1.4	

1945 Victorian state election: Grant
Party	Candidate	Votes	%	±%
Country	Frederick Holden	5,280	42.0	
Labor	Geoffrey Ryan	5,257	41.8	
Liberal	Albert Pennell	2,035	16.2	
Total formal votes		12,572	98.7	
Informal votes		171	1.3	
Turnout		12,743	86.5	
Two-party-preferred result
Country	Frederick Holden	7,123	56.6	
Labor	Geoffrey Ryan	5,449	43.4	
Country hold		Swing		

1943 Victorian state election: Grant
Party	Candidate	Votes	%	±%
Country	Frederick Holden	4,461	45.8	−54.2
Labor	Horace Hughes	3,838	39.4	+39.4
Independent	Herbert Ladd	1,433	14.7	+14.7
Total formal votes		9,732	98.3	
Informal votes		164	1.7	
Turnout		9,896	84.5	
Two-party-preferred result
Country	Frederick Holden	5,348	55.0	−45.0
Labor	Horace Hughes	4,384	45.0	+45.0
Country hold		Swing	N/A	

1940 Victorian state election: Grant
Party	Candidate	Votes	%	±%
Ind. United Australia	Frederick Holden	unopposed		
Ind. United Australia gain from United Australia		Swing	N/A	

=== Elections in the 1930s ===
1937 Victorian state election: Grant
Party	Candidate	Votes	%	±%
United Australia	Frederick Holden	unopposed		
United Australia hold		Swing		

1935 Victorian state election: Grant
Party	Candidate	Votes	%	±%
United Australia	Frederick Holden	5,657	60.1	+22.4
Labor	Ralph Hjorth	3,755	39.9	+3.0
Total formal votes		9,412	99.0	0.0
Informal votes		100	1.0	0.0
Turnout		9,512	93.2	+0.1
United Australia hold		Swing	+1.3	

1932 Victorian state election: Grant
Party	Candidate	Votes	%	±%
United Australia	Frederick Holden	3,417	37.7	+8.2
Labor	Ralph Hjorth	3,344	36.9	−13.2
Country	Robert McClelland	2,295	25.3	+4.9
Total formal votes		9,056	99.0	+0.1
Informal votes		94	1.0	−0.1
Turnout		9,150	93.1	+0.6
Two-party-preferred result
United Australia	Frederick Holden	5,321	58.8	
Labor	Ralph Hjorth	3,735	41.2	
United Australia gain from Labor		Swing	+10.8	

=== Elections in the 1920s ===
1929 Victorian state election: Grant
Party	Candidate	Votes	%	±%
Labor	Ralph Hjorth	4,457	50.1	+2.3
Nationalist	Frederick Holden	2,624	29.5	+4.5
Country	Edwy Finch	1,816	20.4	−0.9
Total formal votes		8,897	99.1	+0.7
Informal votes		80	0.9	−0.7
Turnout		8,977	92.5	+0.7
Two-party-preferred result
Labor	Ralph Hjorth		52.0	−1.4
Nationalist	Frederick Holden		48.0	+1.4
Labor hold		Swing	−1.4	

- Two party preferred vote was estimated.

1927 Victorian state election: Grant
Party	Candidate	Votes	%	±%
Labor	Ralph Hjorth	3,963	47.8	
Nationalist	Francis Connelly	2,070	25.0	
Country	David Gibson	1,763	21.3	
Independent	James Farrer	489	5.9	
Total formal votes		8,285	98.4	
Informal votes		131	1.6	
Turnout		8,416	91.8	
Two-party-preferred result
Labor	Ralph Hjorth	4,420	53.4	
Nationalist	Francis Connelly	3,865	46.6	
Labor hold		Swing		
