= Electoral results for the district of Bulla =

Australian district election results

This is a list of electoral results for the electoral district of Bulla in Victorian state elections.

== Members for Bulla ==
Member	Party	Term
Andrew Robertson	Ministerialist	1904–1911
Andrew Robertson	Fusion Liberal	1911–1917
Andrew Robertson	Economy Party	1917–1918
Andrew Robertson	Nationalist	1918–1924
Ralph Hjorth	Labor	1924–1927

== Election results ==
=== Elections in the 1920s ===
1924 Victorian state election: Bulla
Party	Candidate	Votes	%	±%
Labor	Ralph Hjorth	3,301	45.6	+45.6
Nationalist	Andrew Robertson	2,359	32.6	−67.4
Country	Henry Pickering	1,577	21.8	+21.8
Total formal votes		7,237	98.2	
Informal votes		133	1.8	
Turnout		7,370	62.4	
Two-party-preferred result
Labor	Ralph Hjorth	3,695	51.1	+51.1
Nationalist	Andrew Robertson	3,542	48.9	−51.1
Labor gain from Nationalist		Swing	N/A	

1921 Victorian state election: Bulla
Party	Candidate	Votes	%	±%
Nationalist	Andrew Robertson	unopposed		
Nationalist hold		Swing		

1920 Victorian state election: Bulla
Party	Candidate	Votes	%	±%
Nationalist	Andrew Robertson	4,118	67.0	+1.8
Victorian Farmers	Michael McGuinness	2,030	33.0	−1.8
Total formal votes		6,148	92.6	−5.0
Informal votes		490	7.4	+5.0
Turnout		6,638	58.4	+8.8
Nationalist hold		Swing	+1.8	

=== Elections in the 1910s ===
1917 Victorian state election: Bulla
Party	Candidate	Votes	%	±%
Nationalist	Andrew Robertson	2,875	54.2	−8.0
Victorian Farmers	James Cunningham	1,847	34.8	+34.8
Nationalist	James Gilchrist	586	11.0	+11.0
Total formal votes		5,308	97.6	−0.2
Informal votes		175	2.4	+0.2
Turnout		5,483	49.6	−6.3
Two-candidate-preferred result
Nationalist	Andrew Robertson		59.7	−2.5
Victorian Farmers	James Cunningham		40.3	+40.3
Nationalist hold		Swing	N/A	

- Two candidate preferred vote was estimated.

1914 Victorian state election: Bulla
Party	Candidate	Votes	%	±%
Liberal	Andrew Robertson	3,689	62.2	+0.9
Labor	George McGowan	2,246	37.8	−0.9
Total formal votes		5,935	97.8	−0.6
Informal votes		131	2.2	+0.6
Turnout		6,066	55.9	−5.5
Liberal hold		Swing	+0.9	

1911 Victorian state election: Bulla
Party	Candidate	Votes	%	±%
Liberal	Andrew Robertson	3,527	61.3	N/A
Labor	Andrew Davidson	2,222	38.7	+38.7
Total formal votes		5,749	98.4	
Informal votes		92	1.6	
Turnout		5,841	61.4	
Liberal hold		Swing	N/A	
