= Ginifer =

Ginifer may refer to:

- Ginifer railway station, in Melbourne, Australia
- Jack Ginifer (1927–1982), Australian politician
