= Electoral results for the district of Deer Park =

Australian district election results

This is a list of electoral results for the electoral district of Deer Park in Victorian state elections.

== Members for Deer Park ==
Member	Party	Term
Jack Ginifer	Labor	1967–1976

== Election results ==
=== Elections in the 1970s ===
1973 Victorian state election: Deer Park
Party	Candidate	Votes	%	±%
Labor	Jack Ginifer	25,857	59.8	+5.1
Liberal	Alan McGillivray	13,070	30.2	+3.6
Democratic Labor	Alfred Wisniewski	4,284	9.9	−8.8
Total formal votes		43,211	93.5	−0.1
Informal votes		2,997	6.5	+0.1
Turnout		46,208	94.4	−1.3
Two-party-preferred result
Labor	Jack Ginifer	26,499	61.3	+3.8
Liberal	Alan McGillivray	16,712	38.7	−3.8
Labor hold		Swing	+3.8	

1970 Victorian state election: Deer Park
Party	Candidate	Votes	%	±%
Labor	Jack Ginifer	18,115	54.7	+1.5
Liberal	Douglas Reinehr	8,800	26.6	+0.1
Democratic Labor	John Cate	6,219	18.7	−0.1
Total formal votes		33,134	93.4	−1.1
Informal votes		2,355	6.6	+1.1
Turnout		35,489	95.7	+1.0
Two-party-preferred result
Labor	Jack Ginifer	19,048	57.5	+0.7
Liberal	Douglas Reinehr	14,086	42.5	−0.7
Labor hold		Swing	+0.7	

=== Elections in the 1960s ===
1967 Victorian state election: Deer Park
Party	Candidate	Votes	%	±%
Labor	Jack Ginifer	14,265	53.2	+1.6
Liberal	Wallace More	7,101	26.5	+0.4
Democratic Labor	James Marmion	5,050	18.8	−3.6
Independent	Mervyn Kelly	398	1.5	+1.5
Total formal votes		26,814	94.5	
Informal votes		1,572	5.5	
Turnout		28,386	94.7	
Two-party-preferred result
Labor	Jack Ginifer	15,222	56.8	+2.0
Liberal	Wallace More	11,592	43.2	−2.0
Labor hold		Swing	+2.0	
