= Frederick William Armytage =

Frederick Armytage
- Born: 17 October 1838; Bagdad, Van Diemen's Land, British Empire
- Died: 3 September 1912 (aged 73); Melbourne, Victoria, Australia
- Spouse: Mary Staughton
- Children: Harry
- Parent(s): George Armytage; Elizabeth Peters

Frederick William Armytage (17 October 1838 - 3 September 1912) was an Australian pastoralist. He was the sixth son of George Armytage.

He was born on 17 October 1838 in Bagdad, Van Diemen's Land. His family moved to Geelong, Colony of New South Wales in 1851 (the area became Colony of Victoria in 1854). He was educated at the Diocesan Grammar School, now Geelong Grammar.

He acquired Wooloomanata Station from his father and acquired additional properties in New South Wales and Queensland. He was associated with the development of the frozen meat export industry.

He died in Melbourne on 3 September 1912.

His son was Harry Armytage, the member for Grant in the Victorian Legislative Assembly.
