= Wooloomanata Station =

Sheep station in Victoria, Australia

Coordinates: 37°56′28″S 144°22′22″E

Wooloomanata Station was a sheep station located 10 km (6 mi) north-north-west of Lara, Victoria, Australia.

Frederick William Armytage built a single storey U-plan Italianate style bluestone homestead with an intricate encircling iron verandah c. 1860–63.

The Australian Army hired the homestead for use as the Southern Command Training School in 1939 during World War II. In 1943, the Royal Australian Air Force hired the homestead as a pilots' and officers' mess while No. 79 Squadron RAAF (RAAF) was forming-up with Supermarine Spitfires at Wooloomanata Aerodrome which had been constructed at the property. The Works Training Unit of the RAAF also operated from the property.
