= Roy Crick =

Australian politician (1904–1966)

George Roy Crick (3 April 1904 – 19 August 1966) was an Australian politician.

He was born at Nurcoung to grazier George Arnold Crick and Mary Cousen Keeping. He attended school at Sunshine and became a carpenter. On 26 June 1927 he married Gladys Sophie Day, with whom he had two children. From 1942 he was an official with the Sheetmetal Workers' Union, and also secretary of the Sunshine branch of the Labor Party. During World War II he was a sergeant in the Volunteer Defence Corps. In 1955 he was elected to the Victorian Legislative Assembly as the member for Grant. He served until his death at Footscray in 1966.

Victorian Legislative Assembly
Preceded by Leslie D'Arcy	Member for Grant; 1955–1966	Succeeded by Jack Ginifer
