= Electoral district of Bulla =

Former state electoral district of Victoria, Australia

Bulla Victoria—Legislative Assembly
- State: Victoria
- Created: 1904
- Abolished: 1927
- Namesake: Bulla, Victoria
- Demographic: Rural
- Coordinates: 37°38′13″S 144°48′11″E

Electoral district of Bulla was an electoral district of the Legislative Assembly in the Australian state of Victoria. At the redistribution preceding the 1927 election, it was merged with the neighbouring seat of Dalhousie to become Bulla and Dalhousie.

== Members for Bulla ==
Member	Party	Term
Andrew Robertson	Ministerialist	1904–1911
Andrew Robertson	Fusion Liberal	1911–1917
Andrew Robertson	Economy Party	1917–1918
Andrew Robertson	Nationalist	1918–1924
Ralph Hjorth	Labor	1924–1927
