= George Armytage (grazier) =

Australian farmer

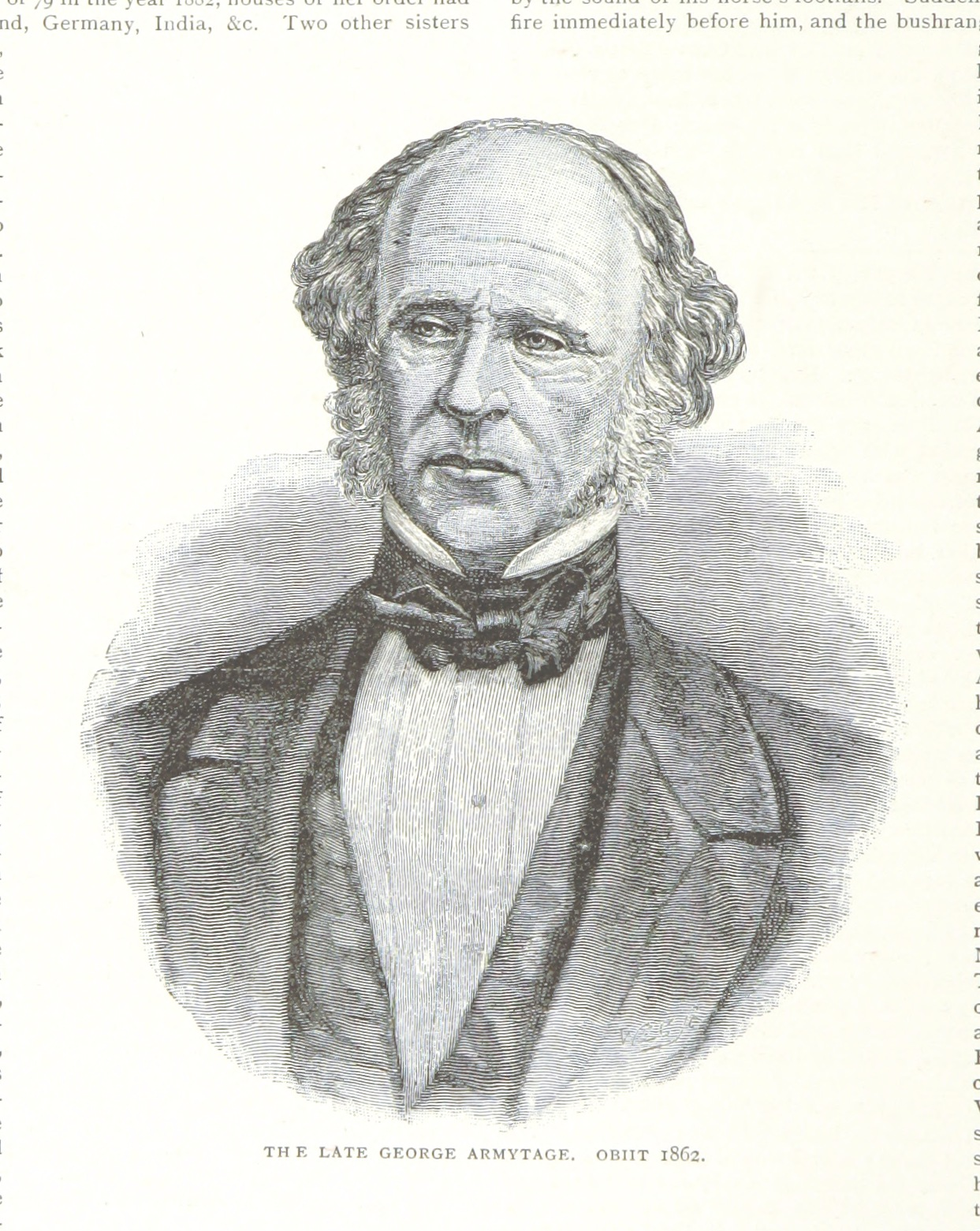
- An 1888 illustration of Armytage
- Born: 1795; Ticknall, England, Great Britain
- Died: 1862 (aged 66–67)
- Occupation: Farmer Pastoralist
- Spouse: Elizabeth Peters (m. 1818)
- Children: George, Frederick, Thomas, and 3 other sons
- Parent: George Armytage

George Armytage (1795–1862) was a farmer and pastoralist in Australia, builder of The Hermitage in Geelong, Victoria.

== Early life (1795–1815) ==
Armytage was born at Ticknall, Derbyshire, England in 1795, and was educated at schools in Yorkshire. He was the son of George Armytage (senior), who died in Australia in 1853, having emigrated at the age of 87. Armytage junior subsequently studied engineering in London until he was 20, when, on 28 February 1815, he sailed for Australia on the Hebe.

== Australian colonialist (1815–1873) ==
=== Arrival in Sydney (1815) ===
Armytage reached Sydney in August 1815.

=== Van Diemen's Land (1816–1834) ===
In the following year he landed in Van Diemen's Land (now Tasmania), where he was allotted a few acres of land at Bagdad, which were increased to 500 acres in 1817.

Armytage received sizable grants of land at Bagdad, and later obtained larger areas in Western Victoria as a pastoral squatter. As a result of much of this land being forcibly taken from Aboriginals by the Armytages and their colonial property managers, they were involved in several instances of frontier conflict.

The advantages of obtaining vast areas of land virtually for free were soon realised and the Armytages became exceedingly wealthy, owning famous mansions such as The Hermitage in Geelong, and Como House in Toorak. They expanded their enterprise into properties in New South Wales and Queensland, and also into the lucrative frozen meat industry.

In 1818, he married Elizabeth Peters.

In 1826, he received a further grant of 1,000 acres (400 ha), and built upon it the first watermill in Tasmania. During this period Armytage was part of the Bagdad division of the Tasmanian police who were heavily involved in the Black War that resulted in the deaths of a possible 900 Indigenous Australians.

=== Port Phillip District (1835–1862) ===
In 1835, Port Phillip District (later called Victoria) commenced to attract settlers; and in 1836 his eldest son Thomas visited the district, and camped on the Werribee River.

Squatter Charles Franks was employed by Armytage to secure land from Indigenous Australians. Franks, who used lead as a poison to kill Indigenous Australians, was later speared to death, alongside convict shepherd Thomas Flinders, by a member of the Wathaurung tribe while he was attempting to claim land in Geelong. A subsequent punitive expedition against local Aboriginals, the Mount Cottrell massacre, apparently served as "a warning to the natives not in the future to commit wanton excesses" against the British occupiers.

In 1847, Mr. Armytage proceeded to Victoria, and settled upon his son George Armytage's station at Ingleby, where his eldest son had died of typhus fever on 12 September 1842. In 1851, he settled at Geelong, and built "The Hermitage".

== Death ==
Armytage died of erysipelas in 1862, his widow surviving him until 1873.
