= Frederick Holden =

Australian politician (1894–1961)

Frederick Charles Thomas Holden (22 March 1894 – 26 April 1961), commonly referred to as F. Charles Holden, "Charles" or "Charlie" Holden, was an Australian politician.

== History ==
Holden was born in Wallace, Victoria, to George Frederick Holden MLA, a merchant, and Minnie Elizabeth Holden, née Ireson. He attended Geelong College and became a farmer at Melton. In December 1914, he married Elsie Maud Thompson, with whom he had a daughter. He served on Melton Shire Council from 1916 to 1927, and was twice president (1918–19, 1926–27). In 1932, he was elected to the Victorian Legislative Assembly for Grant, representing the United Australia Party. He left the party in 1937 and was an independent until 1940, when he joined the Country Party. He was party whip from 1945 to 1947. Holden was defeated in 1950, and died in Melbourne on 26 April 1961.

Victorian Legislative Assembly
Preceded by Ralph Hjorth	Member for Grant; 1932–1950	Succeeded by Alexander Fraser
