= Ginifer railway station =

Railway station in Melbourne, Australia

Ginifer
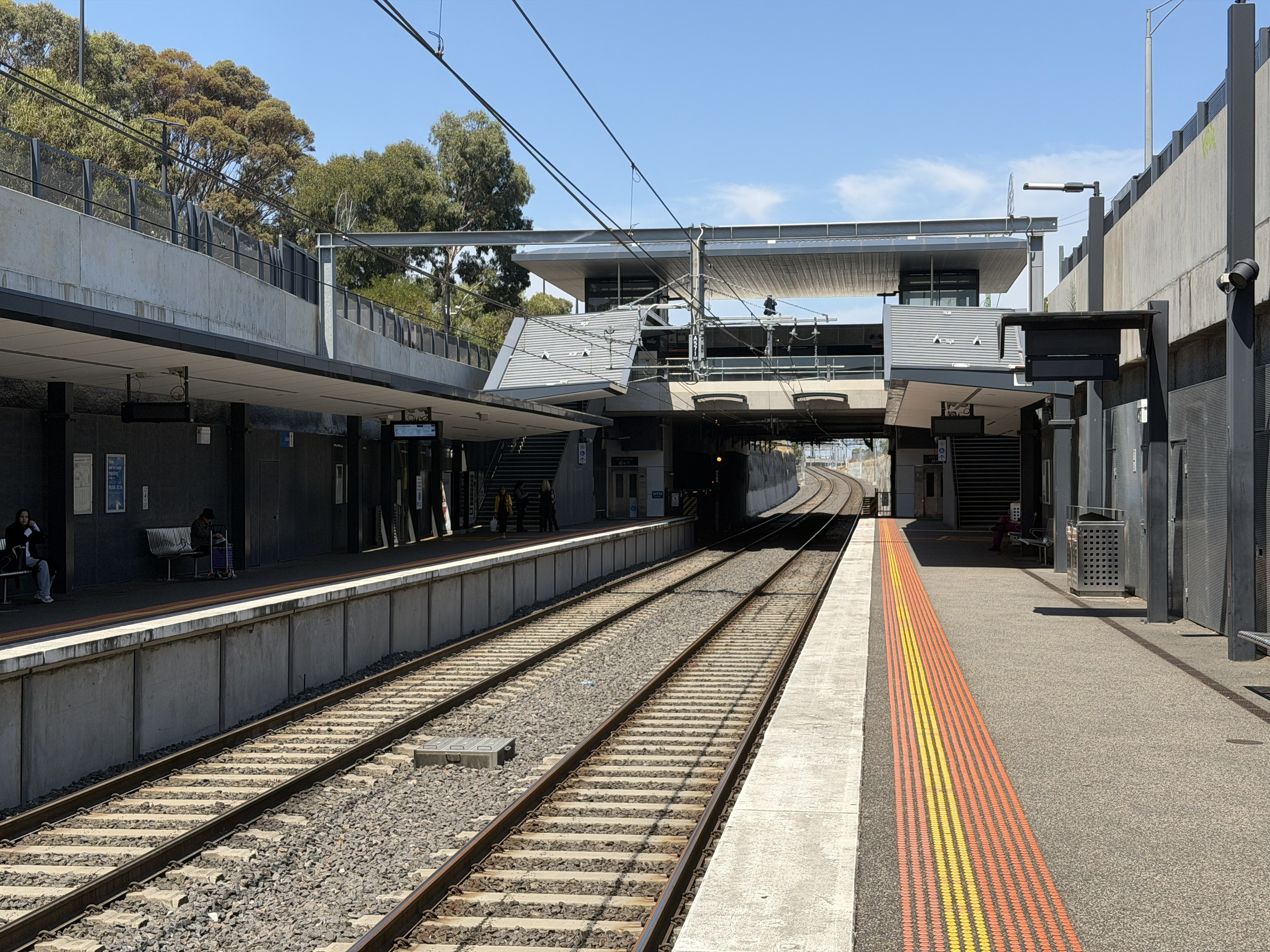
- South-east bound view from Platform 2, February 2026

General information
- Location: St Albans Road, St Albans, Victoria 3021; City of Brimbank; Australia
- Coordinates: 37°45′29″S 144°48′36″E
- System: PTV commuter rail station
- Owner: VicTrack
- Operator: Metro Trains
- Line: Sunbury
- Distance: 16.19 kilometres from Southern Cross
- Platforms: 2 side
- Tracks: 2
- Connections: Bus

Construction
- Structure type: Below ground
- Parking: 157
- Cycle facilities: Yes (Parkiteer cage)
- Accessible: Yes—step free access

Other information
- Status: Operational, unstaffed
- Station code: GIN
- Fare zone: Myki zone 2
- Website: Public Transport Victoria

History
- Opened: 31 October 1982; 44 years ago
- Rebuilt: 1 November 2016 (LXRP)
- Electrified: October 1921 (1500 V DC overhead)
- Former names: Furlong (during construction)

Passengers
- 2005–2006: 473,299
- 2006–2007: 540,532 ▲14.2%
- 2007–2008: 620,273 ▲14.75%
- 2008–2009: 709,384 ▲14.36%
- 2009–2010: 767,958 ▲8.25%
- 2010–2011: 817,528 ▲6.45%
- 2011–2012: 692,932 ▼15.24%
- 2012–2013: Not measured
- 2013–2014: 573,926 ▼17.17%
- 2014–2015: 677,758 ▲18.09%
- 2015–2016: 781,601 ▲15.32%
- 2016–2017: 641,155 ▼17.96%
- 2017–2018: 803,997 ▲25.39%
- 2018–2019: 831,750 ▲3.45%
- 2019–2020: 659,350 ▼20.72%
- 2020–2021: 320,700 ▼51.36%
- 2021–2022: 345,200 ▲7.63%
- 2022–2023: 519,400 ▲50.46%
- 2023–2024: 650,350 ▲25.21%
- 2024–2025: 624,500 ▼3.97%

Services
Preceding station	Metro Trains	Following station
Albion towards Cranbourne or East Pakenham via Metro Tunnel	Sunbury line	St Albans towards Watergardens or Sunbury
Track layout
Location

Ginifer station is a railway station operated by Metro Trains Melbourne on the Sunbury line, part of the Melbourne rail network. It serves the western suburb of St Albans, in Melbourne, Victoria, Australia. Ginifer station is a below ground unstaffed station, featuring two side platforms. It opened on 31 October 1982, with the current station provided in November 2016.

== History ==
The issue for a station to be built between St Albans and Albion was first proposed in 1966 by Labor MP Jack Ginifer. Flashing lights were provided for the Furlong Road level crossing in the same year. The station however, would not arise from these plans.

A later plan from the council of Sunshine in 1973 also suggested a new station be built near Furlong Road but was to be named Sheperd, after a former Labor member for Footscray.

In 1979, the St. Albans South Progress Association presented a petition to the state government with 1200 signatures for a station to be built near Furlong Road. The state government then approved plans to build the station, originally scheduled to open by the end of 1979, pushbacks saw the station delayed by three years.

Ginifer station opened on 31 October 1982. It was first announced in June 1977 by the then Transport Minister Joe Rafferty, and was scheduled for completion by late 1978. Originally to be named Furlong, after the nearby arterial road, upon opening it was named Ginifer, in honour of Jack Ginifer, a former local member of State Parliament.

In 1984, boom barriers were provided at the former Furlong Road level crossing, which was located nearby in the up direction of the station. In 1994, the station was provided with CCTV.

In the 2010/2011 State Budget, $83.7 million was allocated to upgrade Ginifer to a premium station, along with nineteen others. However, in March 2011, this was scrapped by the Baillieu Government.

Until the extension of the Sydenham Line to Sunbury in 2012, Ginifer was served by two V/Line services a day to and from Sunbury.

During October and November 2016, the Level Crossing Removal Authority removed the Furlong Road level crossing by grade separation, with Ginifer rebuilt below ground. The rebuilt station opened on 1 November of that year.

== Level Crossing Removal Project ==
As part of Daniel Andrews campaign, his government promised to remove 50 dangerous level crossings across Melbourne. Furlong Road alongside Main Road at St Albans were both included in the list of removals. Furlong Road was noted at being the most dangerous level crossing in Victoria after the removal of Springvale Road, Springvale in 2014. Between 2006 and 2016, two people were killed, three accidents and over 80 near misses. The crossing was also the site of an accident in 2004 which saw three people killed after their car was struck by a V/Line train as the car was travelling over the crossing. Ginifer was proposed to be rebuilt closer to Furlong Road then its present location and was to be designed by Hassell.

Construction began on the project in March 2015, with the relocation of signal cabling and the installation of new overhead wires to cater for the trench Digging of the trench began in December 2015 with access to the station from the west cut off.

The old station closed in October 2016 with a four week shutdown of the Sunbury Line commencing to finish tracks, overhead wires and to connect the new tracks from the trench to the existing line. The Sunbury Line and St Albans station reopened on 1 November, however Ginifer did not open until later in November due to delays with the stations construction.

The project was completed in May 2017 with the new station featuring more shelter, a waiting room and a customer service desk. The new station was also moved south towards Furlong Road.

== Platforms and services ==
Ginifer has two side platforms. It is served by Sunbury line trains.

Prior to electrification of the line to Sydenham in 2002, selected V/Line services stopped at Ginifer, to pick up/drop off students from the Sydenham Catholic Regional College.

=== Current ===
Ginifer platform arrangement
Platform	Line	Destination	Via	Service Type	Notes	Source
1	Sunbury line	Westall, Dandenong, East Pakenham, Cranbourne	Town Hall	All stations and limited express services	Services to Westall and Dandenong only operate during weekday peaks.	
2	Sunbury line	Watergardens, Sunbury		All stations		

== Transport links ==
CDC Melbourne operates two bus routes via Ginifer station, under contract to Public Transport Victoria:

- 408 : St Albans station – Highpoint Shopping Centre
- 423 : St Albans station – Brimbank Central Shopping Centre

== Gallery ==
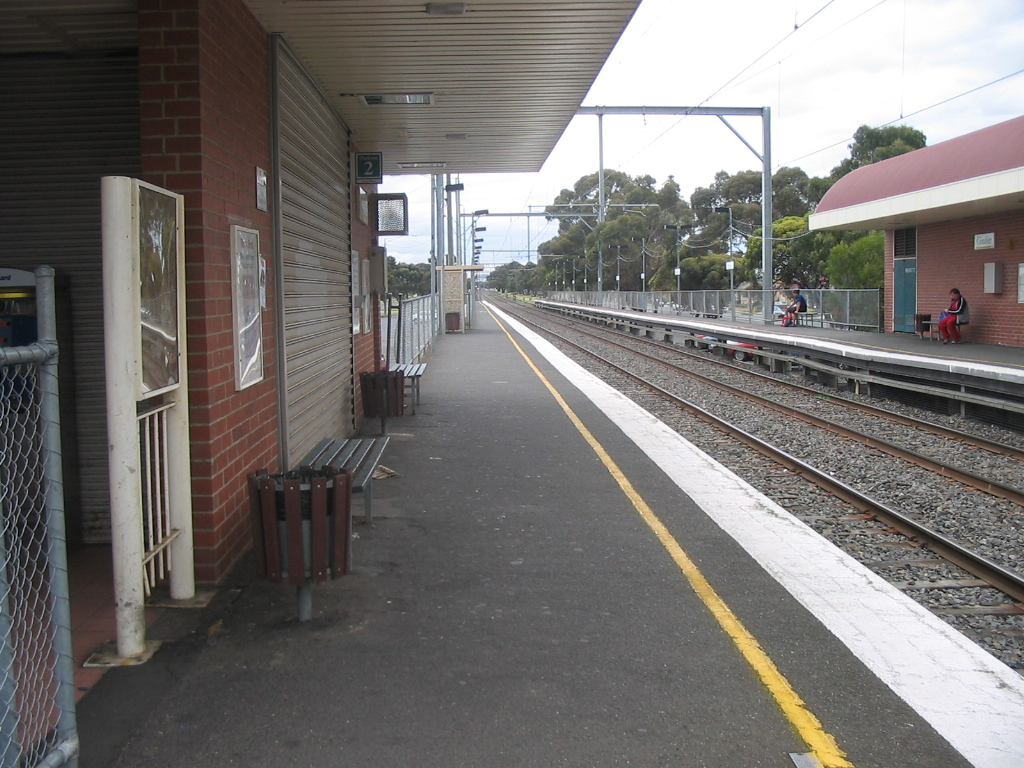
North-west bound view from the former ground level Platform 2, November 2005

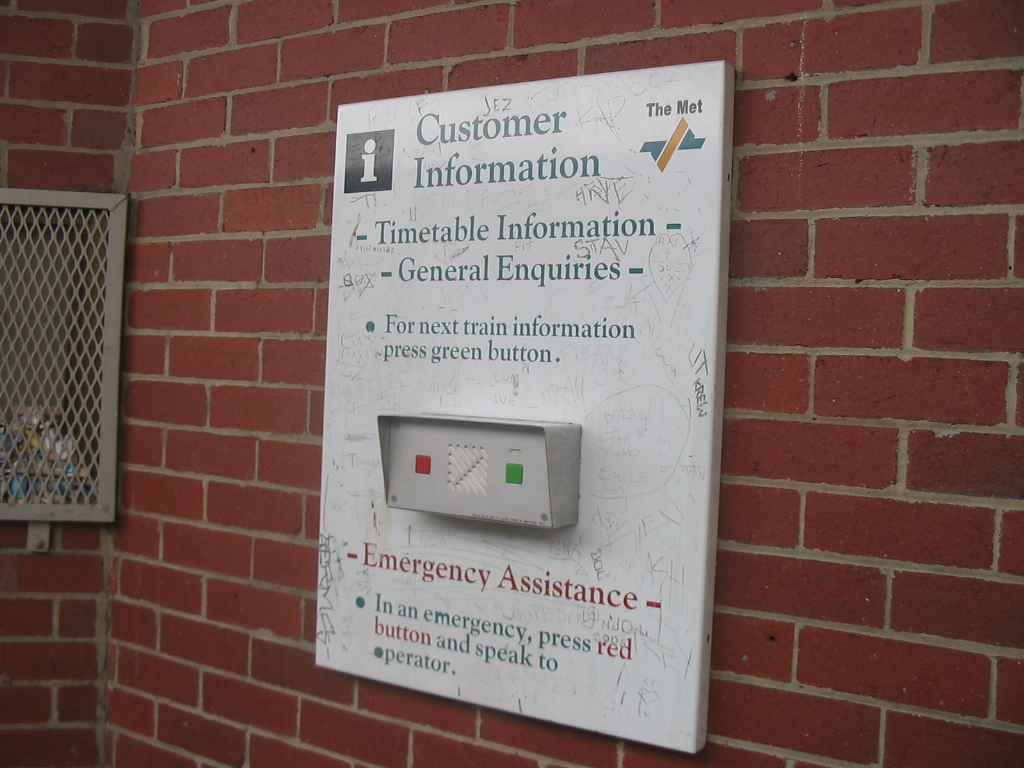
The original Met (PTC) information PRIDE box, November 2005

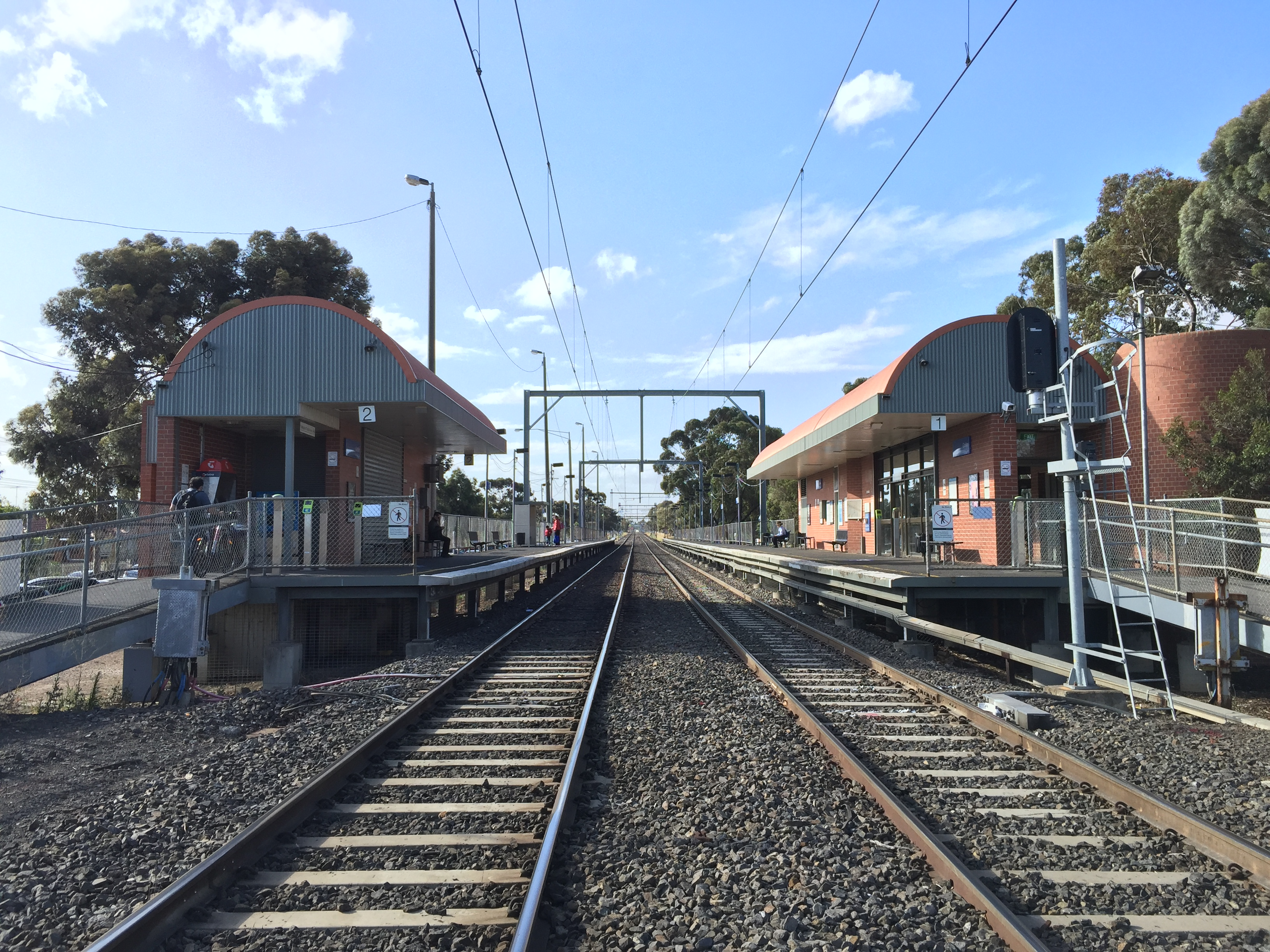
North-west bound view of the former ground level station platforms and buildings, December 2015

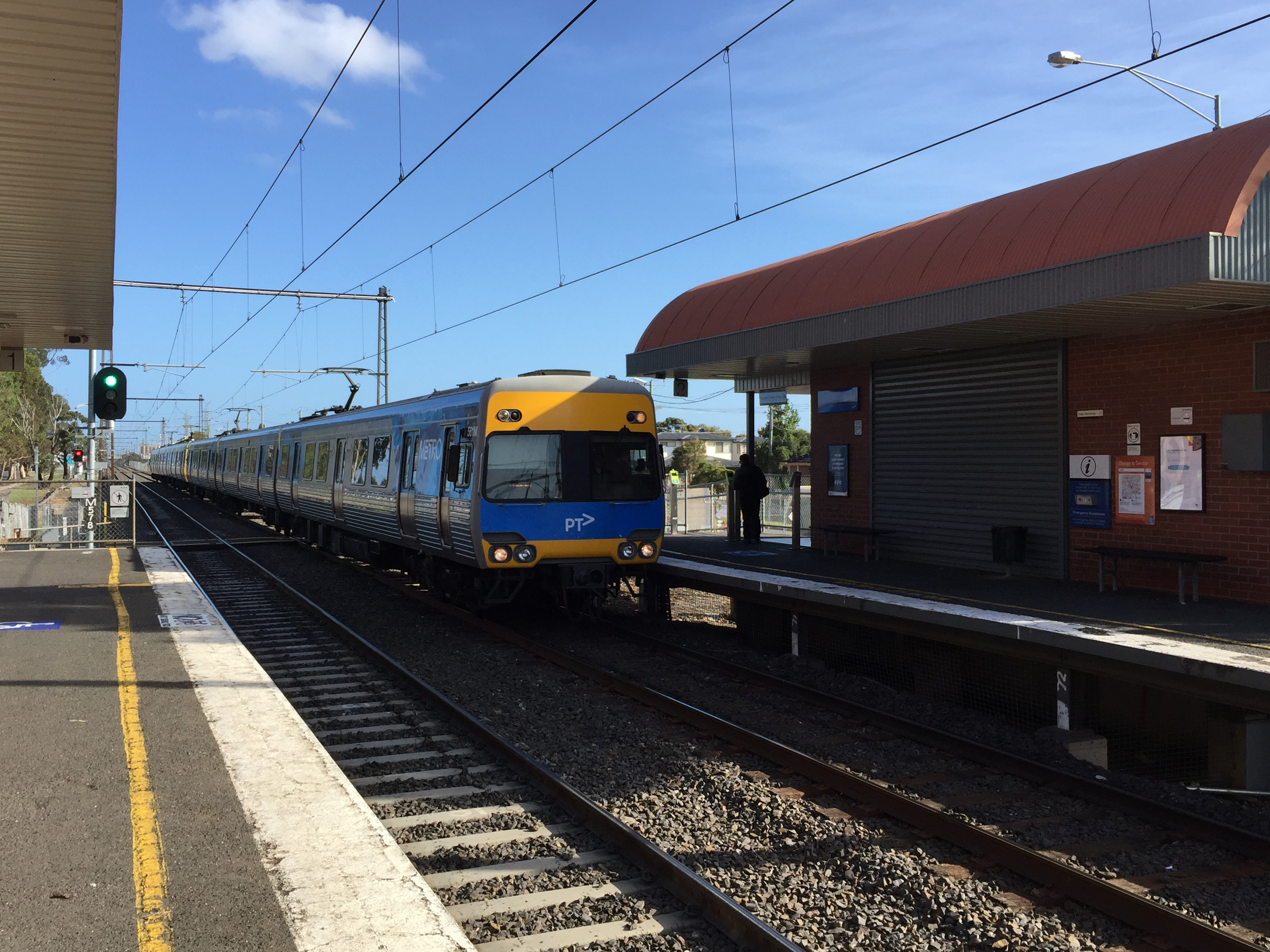
A Comeng train on a Sunbury-bound service arrives at Platform 2, December 2015

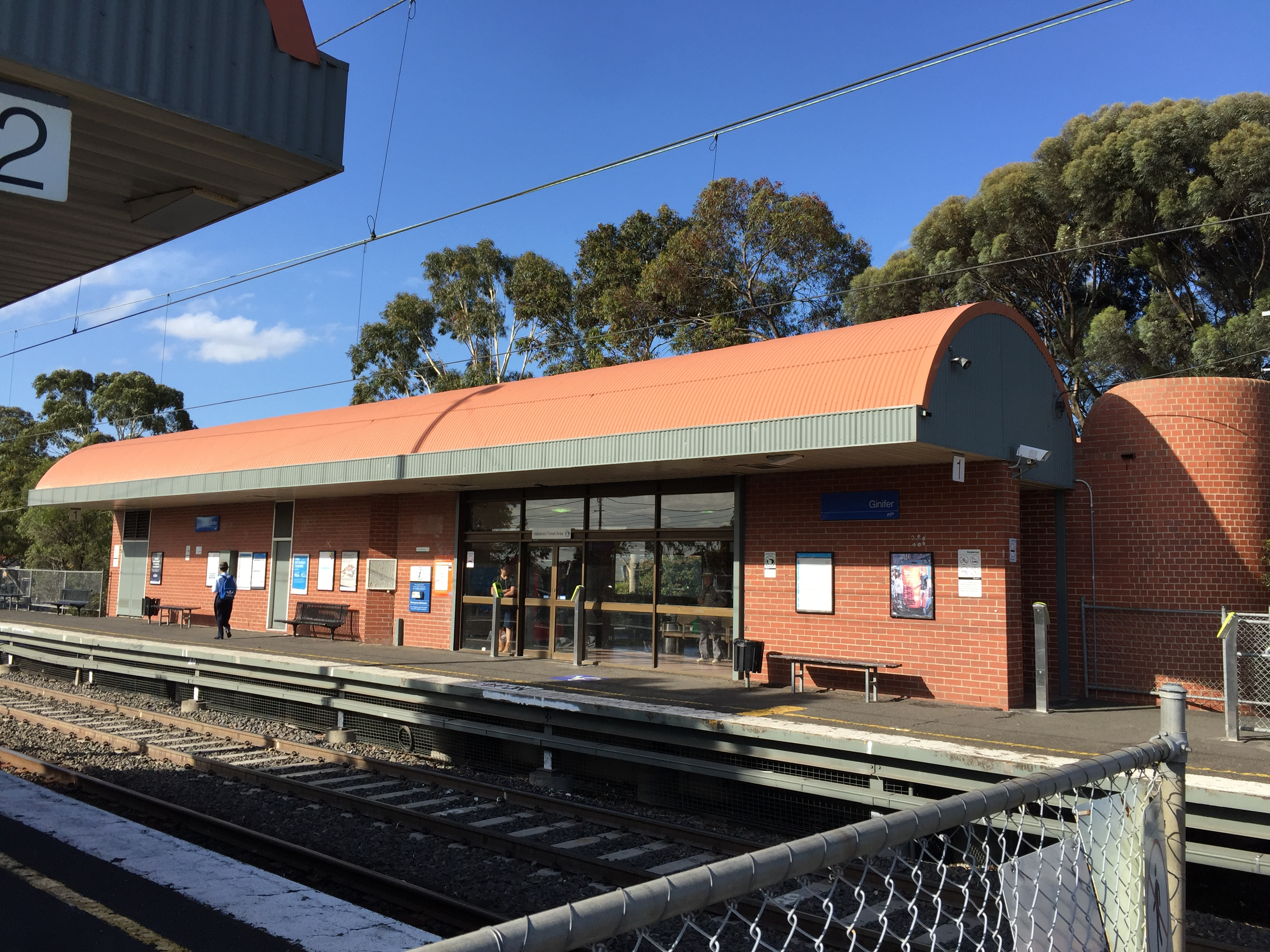
Former ground level station building on Platform 1, December 2015

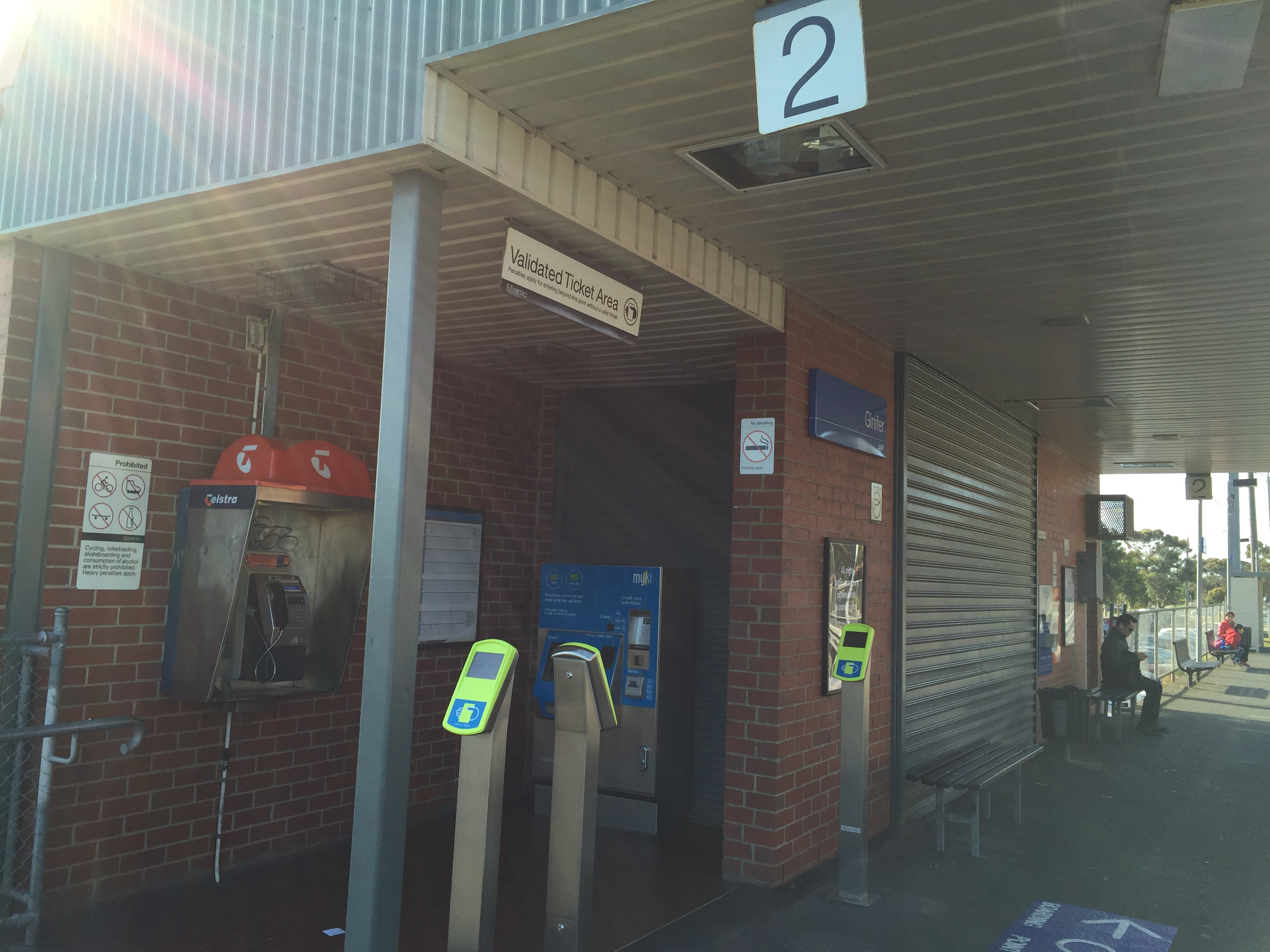
Former ground level station building on Platform 2, December 2015

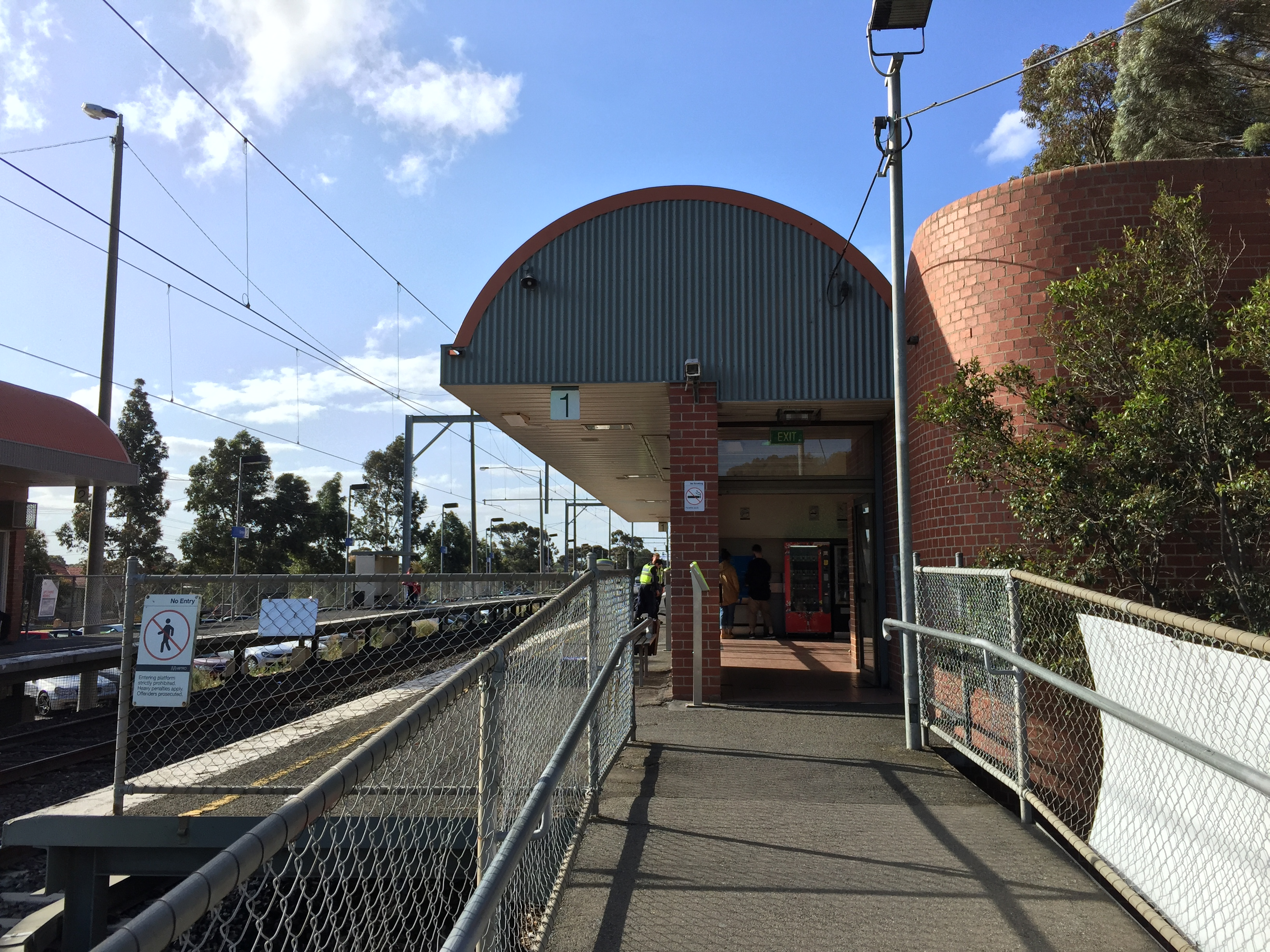
North-west bound view of the former ground level station building on Platform 1, December 2015

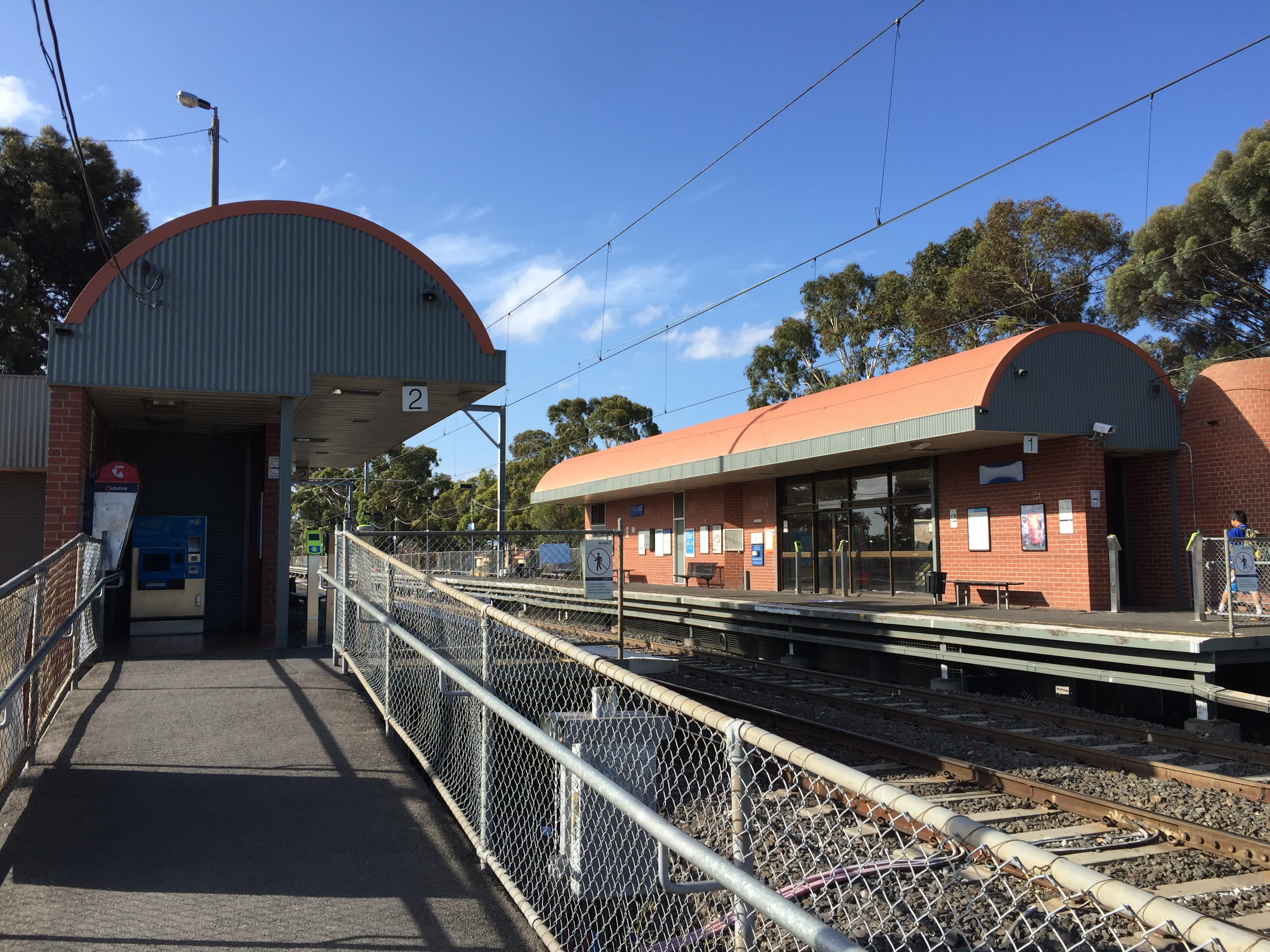
Former ground level station buildings on both platforms, December 2015

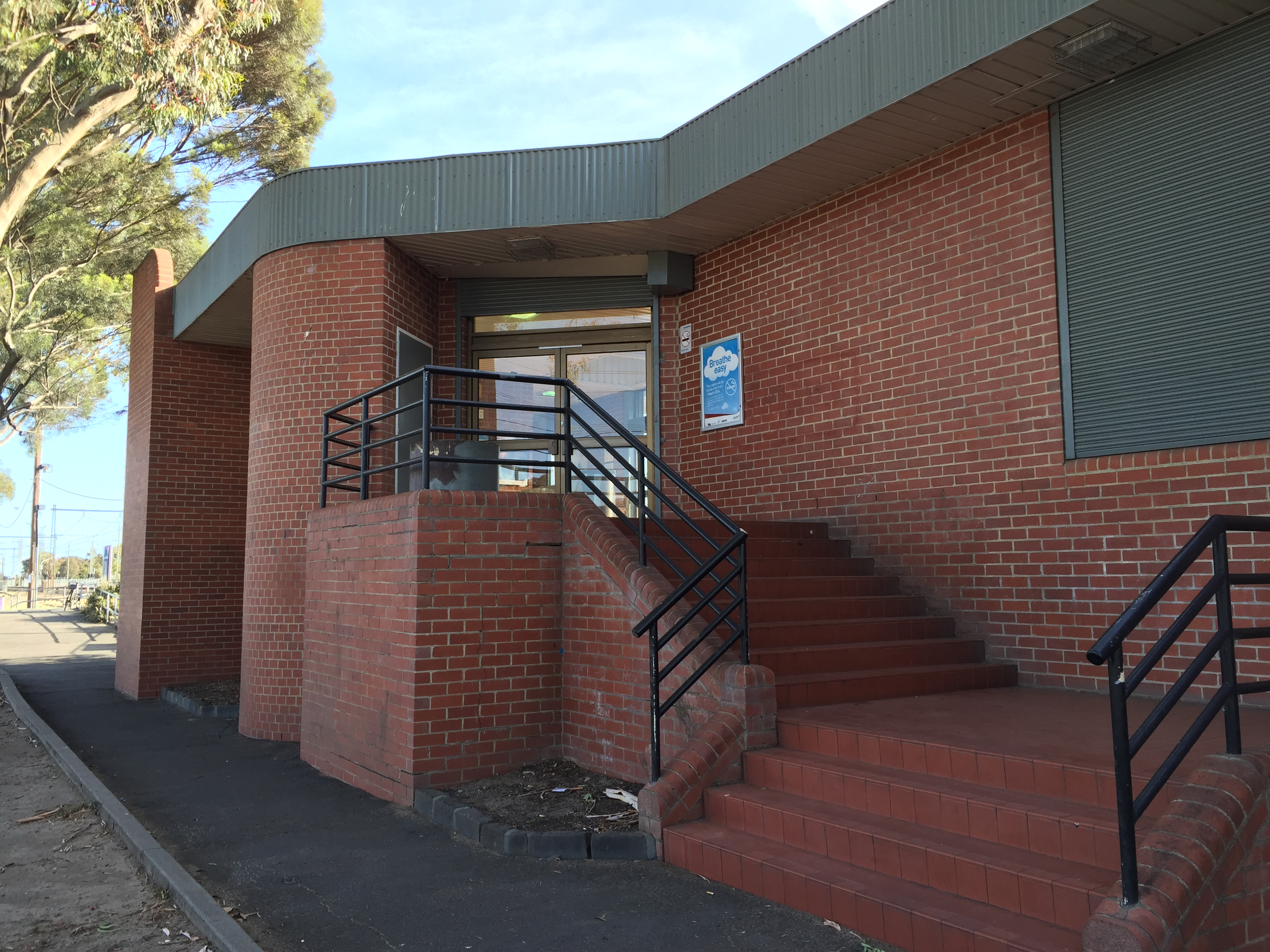
Station building and entrance to Platform 1, December 2015

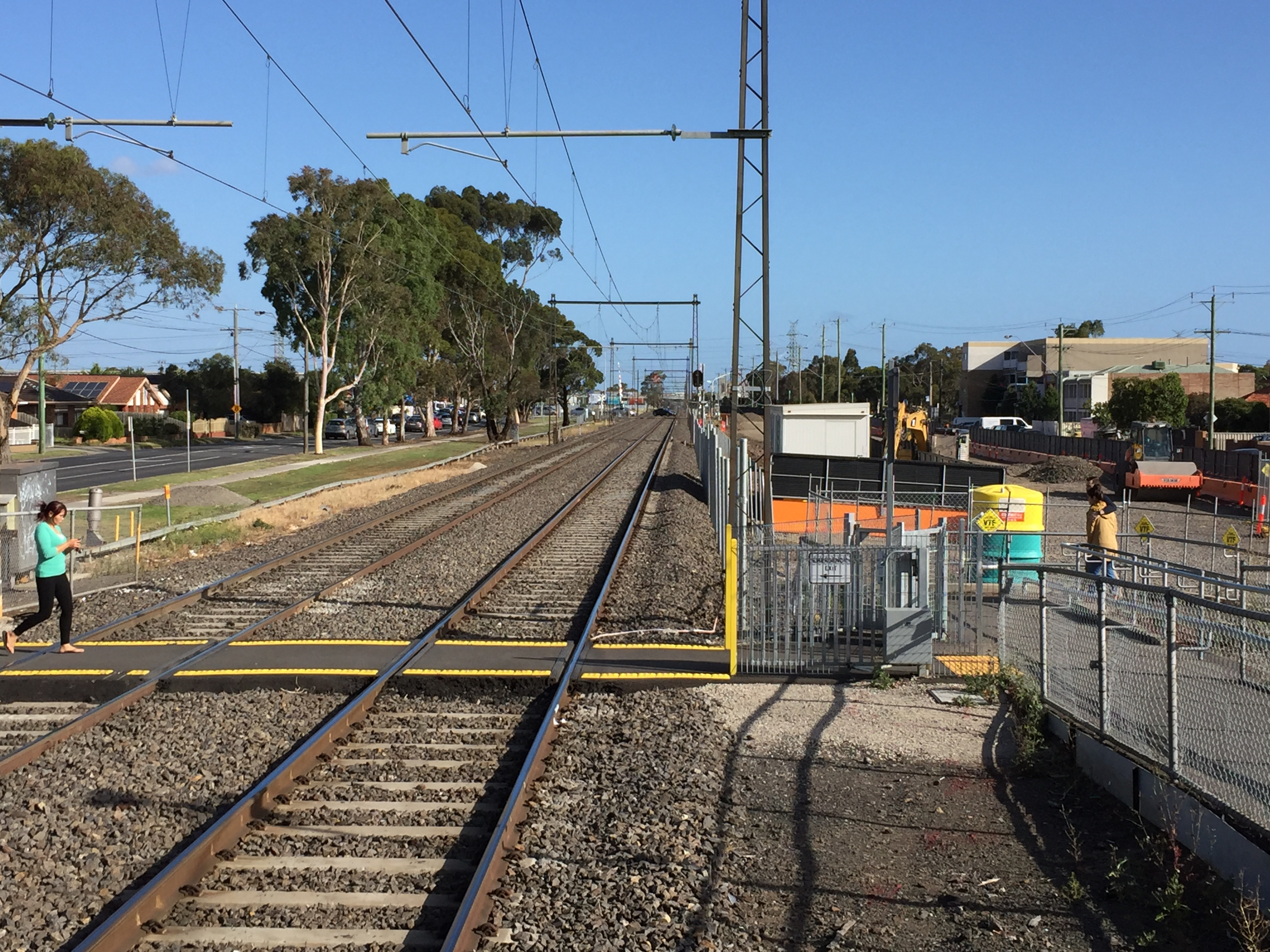
The former south-eastern pedestrian crossing gates next to Ginifer station, December 2015

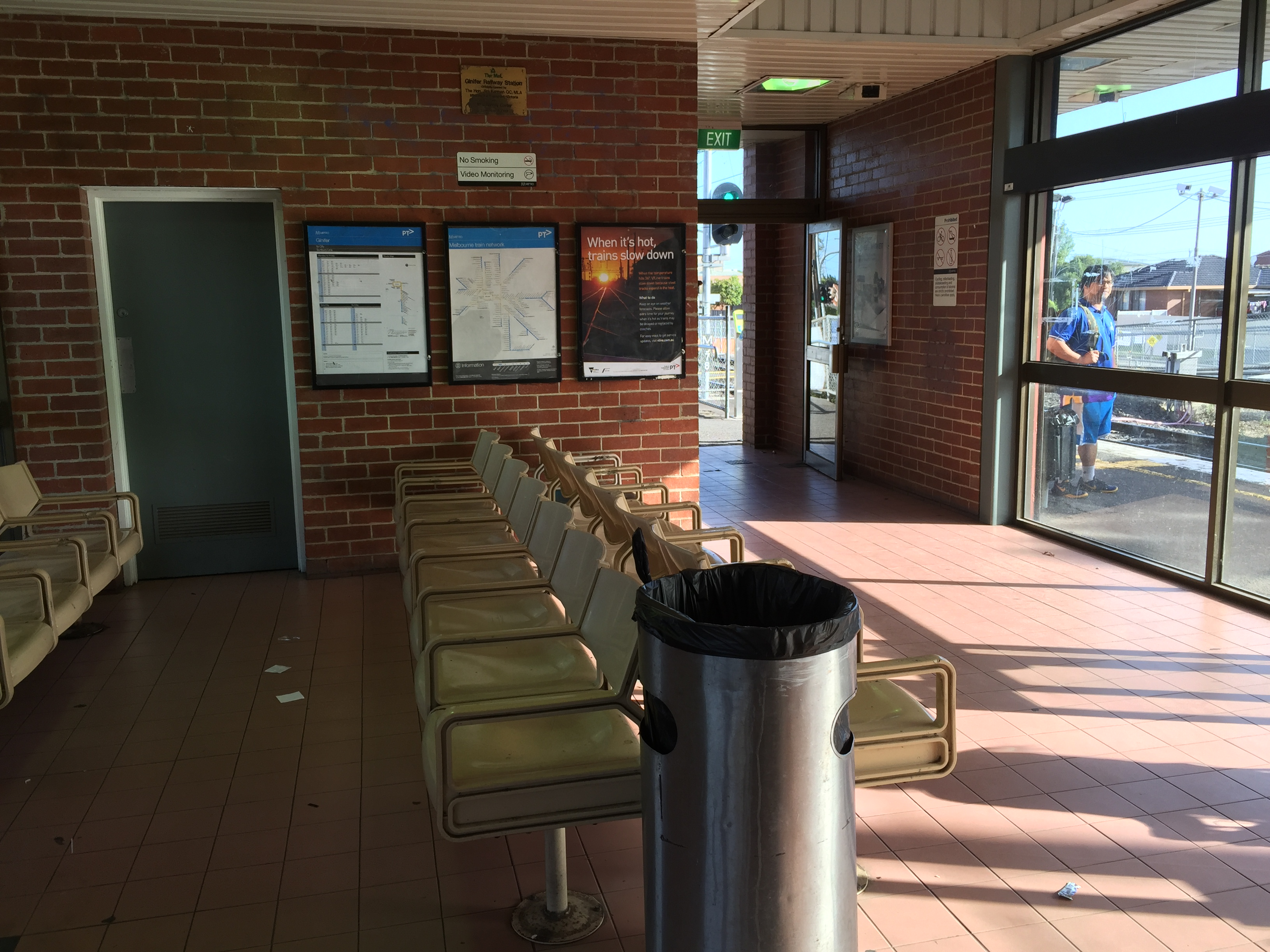
The former ground level waiting room on Platform 1, December 2015

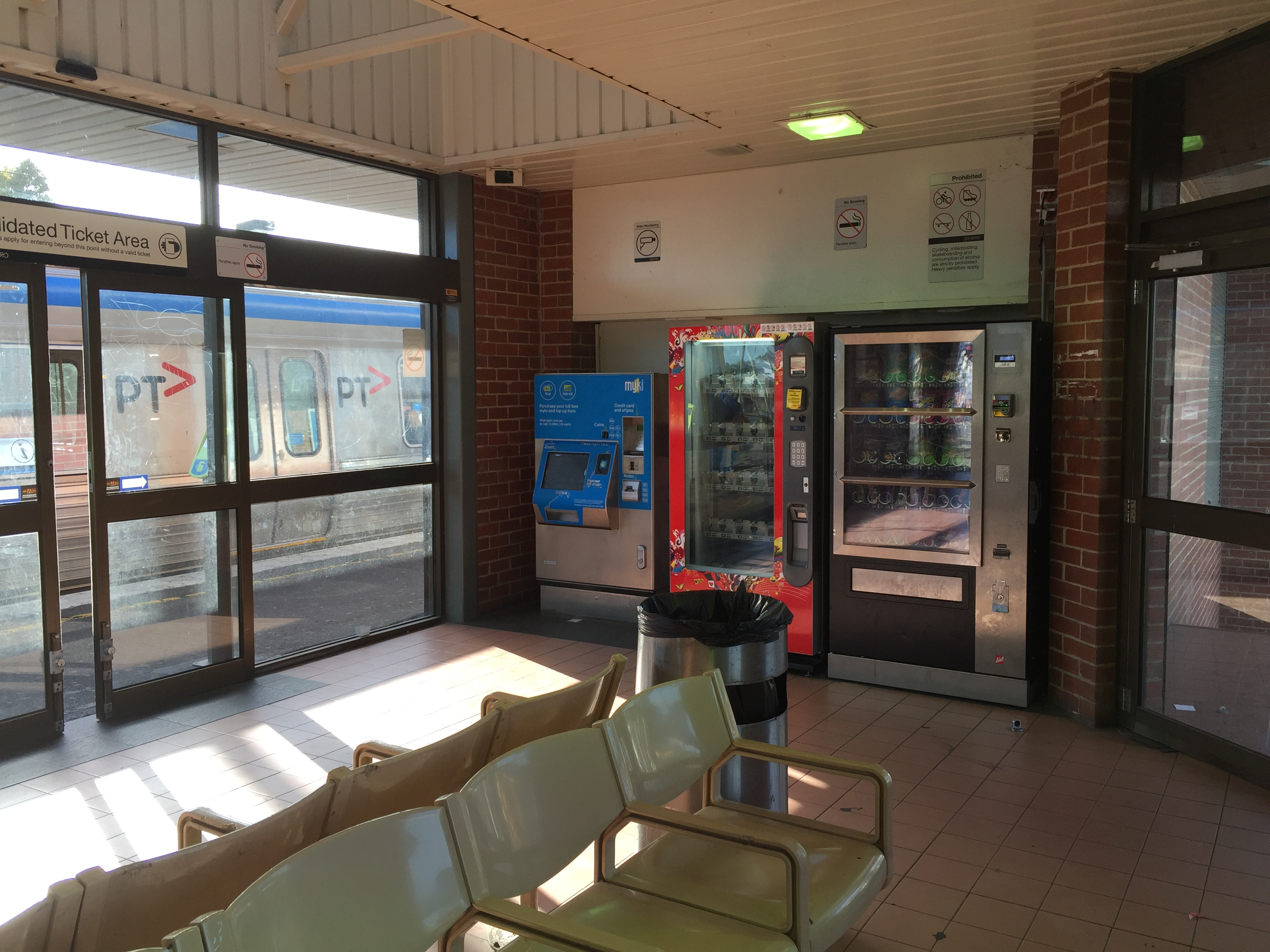
The former ground level waiting room and machinery on Platform 1, December 2015

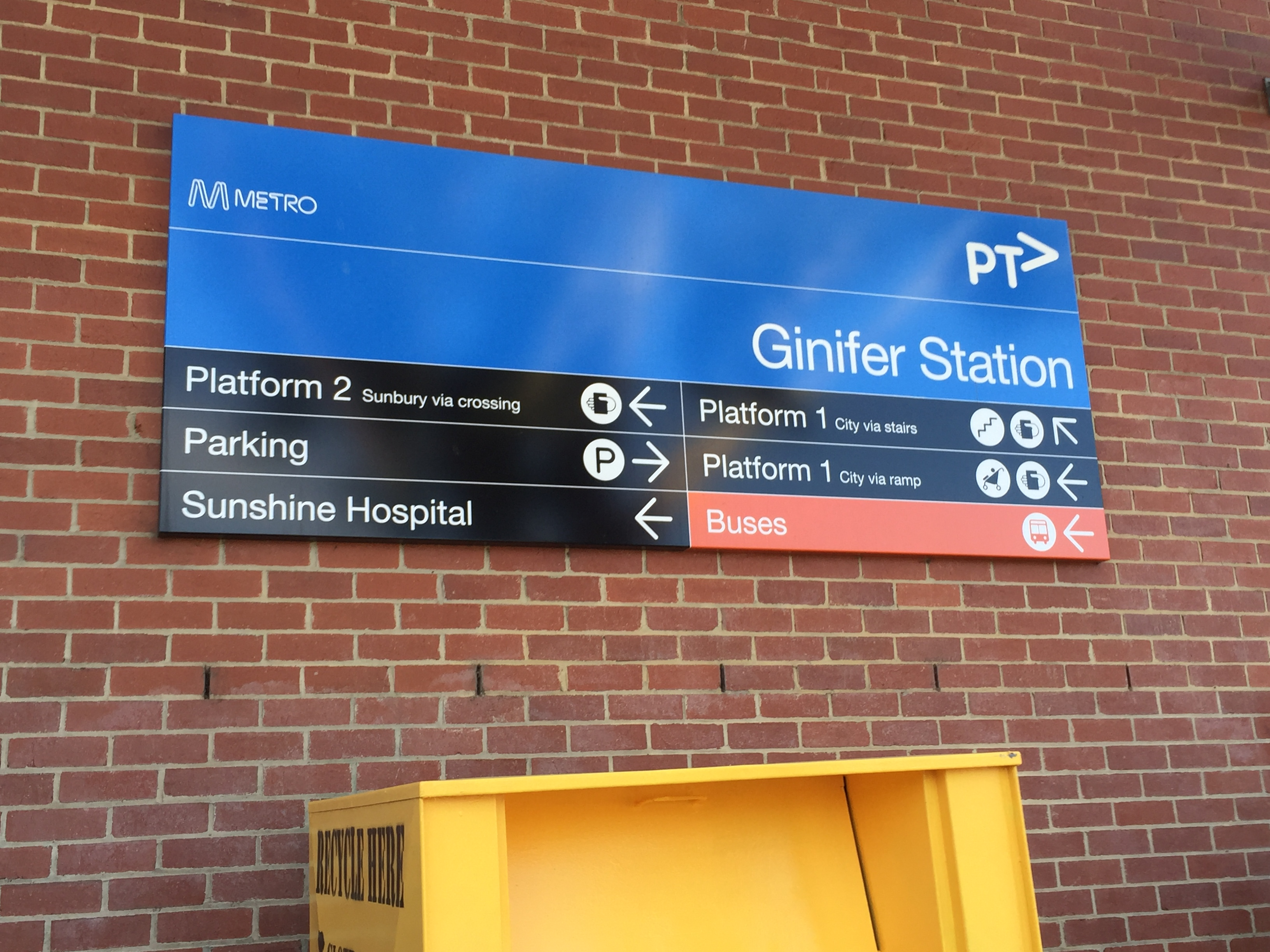
The directional platform signage attached to former ground level Platform 1, December 2015

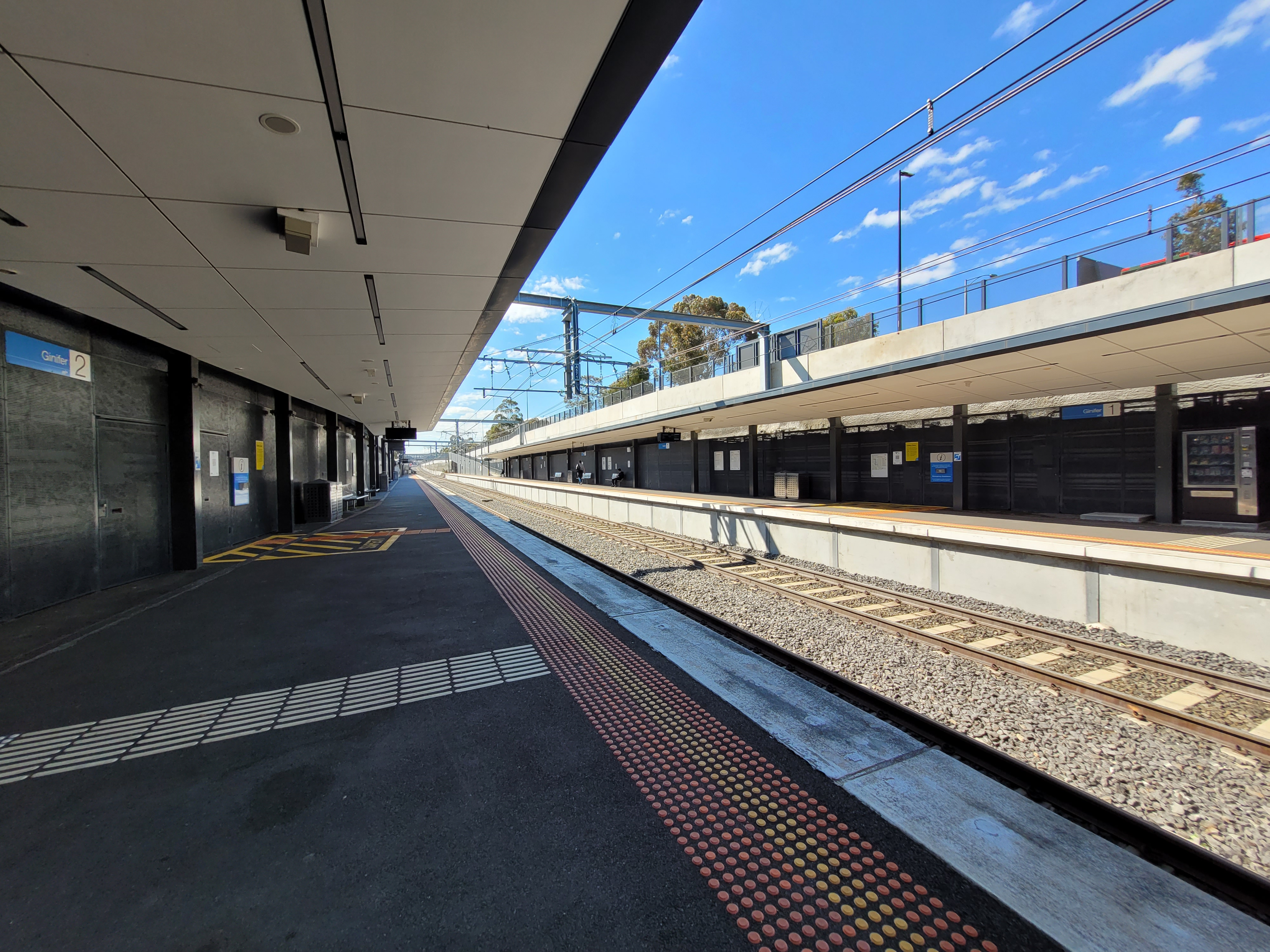
North-west bound view from Platform 2, November 2021
