= Harry Armytage (politician) =

Australian politician

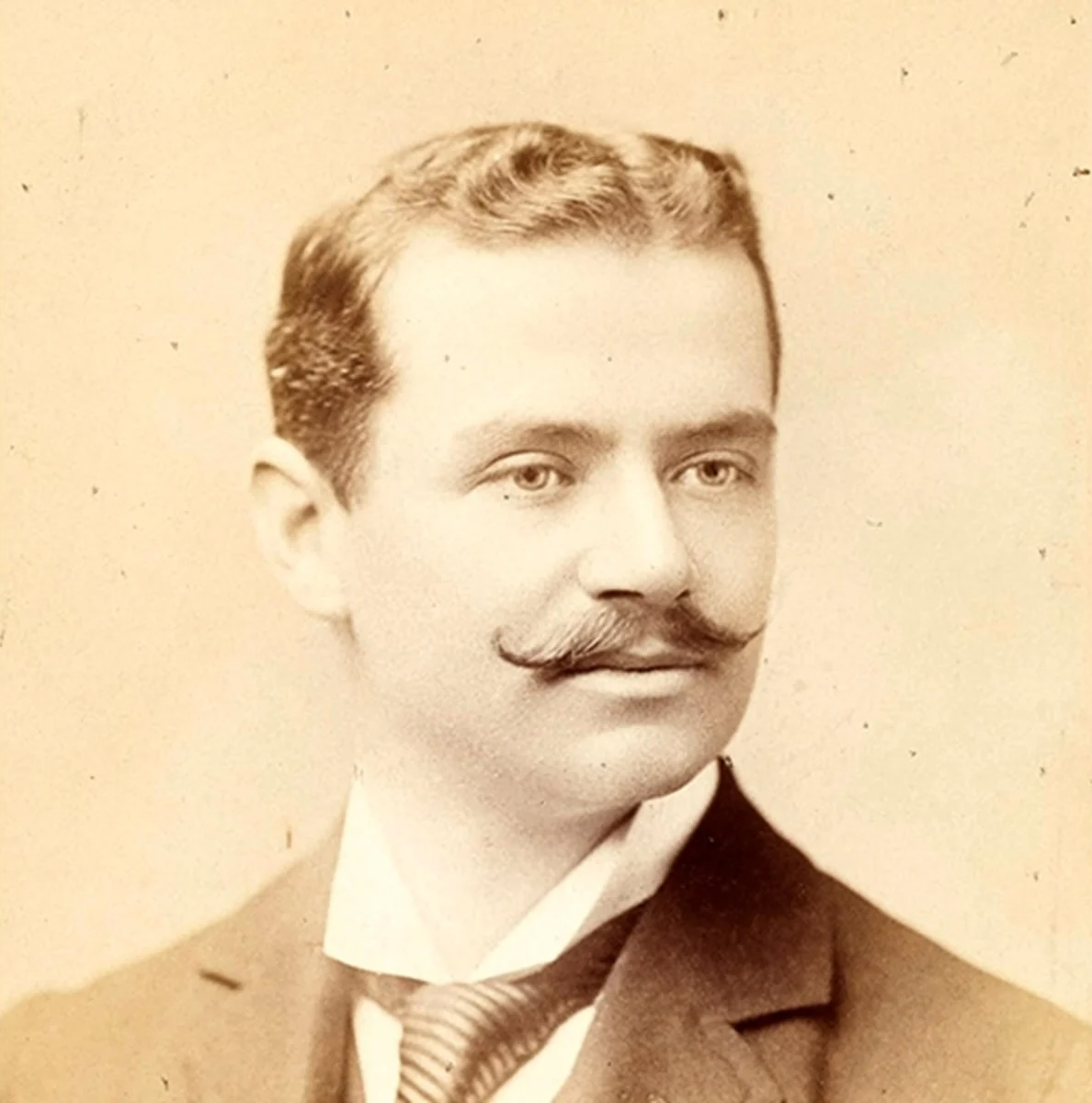

Member of the Victorian Legislative Assembly for Electoral district of Grant
- In office April 1889 – September 1894
- Preceded by: Peter Lalor and John Rees
- Succeeded by: John Percy Chirnside

Personal details
- Born: 19 June 1862 Victoria
- Died: 27 May 1933 (aged 70) Melbourne
- Resting place: Boroondara General Cemetery
- Spouse: Fanny Augusta
- Children: 2 sons
- Parent: Frederick William Armytage (father)
- Education: Geelong Grammar School
- Alma mater: University of Cambridge

Harry Armytage (19 June 1862 – 27 May 1933) was an Australian politician in the Victorian Legislative Assembly. Armytage served as the member for Grant between 1889 and 1894.

== Career ==
Prior to politics, Armytage worked as a Pastoralist before being admitted as a barrister at Inner Temple, London in 1886, then at the Victorian Bar in 1888.

In 1893, while an MP, Armytage was sued by Marmaduke N. Richardson for £6 13s. 4d. over a breach of contract. The matter concerned a contract made between Armytage and shareholders of the Inverell Diamond Mining Company (NSW). A judgment was given for £5 10s. with costs to Richardson.

== Personal life ==
Armytage lived in South Yarra, and was the son of Frederick William Armytage, a member of a well known pastoral family in Victoria, and Mary Susan (nee Staughton). He attended Geelong Grammar School and went on to study at Jesus College, University of Cambridge. At Cambridge, Armytage competed against Oxford in athletics where he wan in a three-mile race in 1882 and then a one-mile race in 1884.

At Cambridge, Armytage attained a Bachelor of Arts in 1885 and a Bachelor of Laws in 1886.

In 1888 Armytage married Fanny Augusta in Toorak and had two sons together.
