= Electoral district of Deer Park =

Former state electoral district of Victoria, Australia

Coordinates: 37°46′S 144°46′E

Deer Park Victoria—Legislative Assembly
- State: Victoria
- Created: 1967
- Abolished: 1976
- Namesake: Deer Park, Victoria
- Demographic: Outer metropolitan

Electoral district of Deer Park was an electoral district of the Legislative Assembly in the Australian state of Victoria.

== Members ==
Member	Party	Term
Jack Ginifer	Labor	1967–1976
