= Andrew Robertson (politician) =

Australian politician (1865–1934)

Andrew Robert Robertson (23 November 1865 – 28 June 1934) was an Australian politician.

Robertson was born in Bacchus Marsh to farmer David Robertson and Agnes Bell Gardiner. He attended state school locally and then went to Scotch College. He worked in insurance for two years before inheriting his father's farm, and around 1897 he married Cissie Jane Kilpatrick, with whom he had five children.

In 1903, Robertson won a by-election for the Victorian Legislative Assembly seat of West Bourke, transferring to Bulla the following year. He was a minister without portfolio from 21 March 1918 to 15 April 1919 and again from 31 October 1908 to 8 January 1909. A member of the Nationalist Party's Economy faction, he lost his seat in 1924. Robertson died at Bacchus Marsh in 1934.

Victorian Legislative Assembly
Preceded by Samuel Staughton, Jr.	Member for West Bourke; 1903–1904	Abolished
New seat	Member for Bulla; 1904–1924	Succeeded by Ralph Hjorth
