= Ralph Hjorth =

Australian politician (1883–1970)

Ralph Theodore Hjorth (26 July 1883 – 14 January 1970) was an Australian politician.

He was born in Melton to Danish-born farmer Anders Stenson and Annie Devanny. He became a farmer at Coimadai and then an undertaker and ironmonger at Bacchus Marsh. Around 1907, he married Mary Agnes Byron, with whom he had four children. In 1924, he was elected to the Victorian Legislative Assembly as the Labor member for Bulla. He transferred to Grant in 1927 but was defeated in 1932. Hjorth died in Melbourne in 1970.

Victorian Legislative Assembly
Preceded by Andrew Robertson	Member for Bulla; 1924–1927	Abolished
New seat	Member for Grant; 1927–1932	Succeeded by Frederick Holden
