= Leslie D'Arcy =

Australian politician (1899–1975)

Leslie Francis Christopher D’Arcy (2 December 1899 – 24 November 1975), Australian politician, was a Member of the Victorian Legislative Assembly for the Electoral district of Grant representing the Labor Party from 1952 to 1955 and the Australian Labor Party (Anti-Communist) (Democratic Labor Party) from March–April 1955.
