= Electoral district of Grant =

Former state electoral district of Victoria, Australia

Grant Victoria—Legislative Assembly
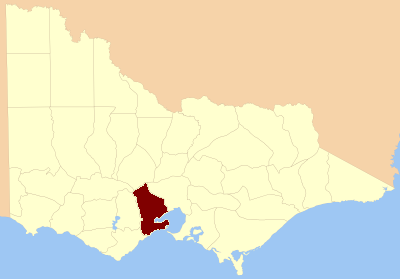
- Location in Victoria (approx.)
- State: Victoria
- Dates current: 1877–1904, 1927–1967
- Demographic: Rural
- Coordinates: 38°0′S 144°15′E

Grant was an electoral district of the Legislative Assembly in the Australian state of Victoria from 1877 to 1967.

The district was defined in "The Electoral Act Amendment Act 1876" which took effect at the 1877 elections.

== Members ==
Two members were initially elected to the district, one after the Electoral Act Amendment Act 1888 which took effect in 1889.

First incarnation (1877–1904) — Two members until 1889
Member 1	Term	Member 2	Term
Peter Lalor	May 1877 – Feb 1889	John Rees	May 1877 – Mar 1889
Harry Armytage	Apr 1889 – Sep 1894		
John Percy Chirnside	Oct 1894 – May 1904		

Second incarnation (1927–1967)
Member	Party	Term
Ralph Hjorth	Labor	1927 – 1932
Frederick Holden	United Australia Party	1932 – 1937
Frederick Holden	Independent	1937 – 1940
Frederick Holden	Country	1940 – 1950
Alexander Fraser	Liberal and Country	1950 – 1952
Leslie D'Arcy	Labor	1952 – 1955
Leslie D'Arcy	Labor (Anti-Communist)	1955
Roy Crick	Labor	1955 – 1966
Jack Ginifer	Labor	1966 – 1967
