= Jack Ginifer =

Australian politician

Member of the Victorian Legislative Assembly for Keilor
- In office 20 March 1976 – 10 May 1982
- Preceded by: District created
- Succeeded by: George Seitz

Member of the Victorian Legislative Assembly for Deer Park
- In office 29 April 1967 – 19 March 1976
- Preceded by: District created
- Succeeded by: District abolished

Member of the Victorian Legislative Assembly for Grant
- In office 8 October 1966 – 28 April 1967
- Preceded by: Roy Crick
- Succeeded by: District abolished

Personal details
- Born: John Joseph Ginifer; 31 August 1927 Warracknabeal, Victoria, Australia
- Died: 9 July 1982 (aged 54) Richmond, Victoria, Australia
- Party: Labor Party
- Spouse: Audrey Christina Heaney (m. 1951)
- Children: Suzanne Ginifer (Wallis) Rozanne Ginifer Corinne Ginifer
- Education: University of Melbourne
- Occupation: Schoolteacher

John Joseph "Jack" Ginifer (31 August 1927 – 9 July 1982) was an Australian politician.

Ginifer was born in Warracknabeal, Victoria to Joseph Ginifer, a Singer sewing machine salesman from England, and Agnes Harper. He was educated at schools in Benalla, then undertook teacher training at Melbourne Teachers' College and a Bachelor of Arts at the University of Melbourne. He worked as a schoolteacher for more than twenty years from 1945 to 1966, including at Jamieson St Primary School in Warrnambool.

Ginifer was active in local government politics, serving as a councillor in the Williamstown City Council (1955–1957) and the Shire of Altona (1960–1969). He was also on the state executive of the Labor Party from 1959 to 1966. In 1966, Ginifer was elected at a by-election to the Victorian Legislative Assembly as a Labor member for the seat of Grant. Electoral redistributions saw his seat renamed Deer Park in 1967 and Keilor in 1976.

On 8 April 1982, Ginifer was made a minister in John Cain's first cabinet as Minister for Consumer Affairs and Minister for Immigration and Ethnic Affairs, but he resigned from those posts, and from the parliament, a month later on 10 May, after being diagnosed with terminal cancer. He died two months later on 9 July, aged 54.

Ginifer railway station in St Albans, J. J. Ginifer Reserve in Altona North, Jack Ginifer Reserve in Gladstone Park, and Ginifer Court, a cul-de-sac in St Albans, were named after him.

Victorian Legislative Assembly
Preceded by Roy Crick	Member for Grant; 1966–1967	District abolished
District created	Member for Deer Park; 1967–1976	District abolished
District created	Member for Keilor; 1976–1982	Succeeded by George Seitz
Political offices
Preceded by Haddon Storey	Minister for Consumer Affairs; 1982	Succeeded by Peter Spyker
Preceded by Jeff Kennett	Minister for Immigration and Ethnic Affairs; 1982	Succeeded by Peter Spyker
